= 4th Northern Ireland Assembly =

Northern Ireland MLAs 2011 to 2016

←	3rd Assembly	5th Assembly	→

Overview
- Legislative body: Assembly
- Jurisdiction: Northern Ireland
- Meeting place: Parliament Buildings, Stormont
- Term: 12 May 2011 – 29 March 2016
- Election: 2011 assembly election
- Government: Executive of the 4th Assembly
- Members: 108
- Speaker: Mitchel McLaughlin — William Hay until 13 October 2014
- First Minister: Arlene Foster — Peter Robinson until 11 January 2016 — Arlene Foster (Acting) until 20 October 2015 — Peter Robinson until 30 September 2015
- Deputy First Minister: Martin McGuinness — John O'Dowd (Acting) until 31 October 2011 — Martin McGuinness until 20 September 2011

Sessions
- 1st: 12 May 2011 – 28 June 2011
- 2nd: 12 September 2011 – 3 July 2012
- 3rd: 10 September 2012 – 16 July 2013
- 4th: 9 September 2013 – 1 July 2014
- 5th: 8 September 2014 – 4 July 2015

The fourth Northern Ireland Assembly was the unicameral devolved legislature of Northern Ireland following the 2011 assembly election on 5 May 2011. This iteration of the elected Assembly convened for the first time on 12 May 2011 in Parliament Buildings in Stormont, and ran for a full term.

The election saw 18 Assembly constituencies return six Members of the Legislative Assembly (MLAs) each. The Democratic Unionist Party (DUP), led by Peter Robinson, remained the largest unionist party and the largest overall. Sinn Féin, led by Gerry Adams, remained the largest Irish nationalist party and the second largest overall. As per the Belfast Agreement and the St Andrews Agreement, a power-sharing coalition was then formed with the DUP, Sinn Féin, the Ulster Unionist Party (UUP), the Social Democratic and Labour Party (SDLP) and the Alliance Party of Northern Ireland. William Hay was elected as Speaker in the first sitting of the assembly. Following Hay's retirement, Mitchel McLaughlin was elected as the first nationalist Speaker in October 2014.

The UUP, led by Tom Elliott, and the SDLP, led by Margaret Ritchie, secured fewer seats than in the previous assembly. The Alliance Party, led by David Ford, emerged from the election with an increased mandate after securing an additional seat. The four main parties which sat outside of the Northern Ireland Executive and thereby served unofficially in opposition were the Green Party in Northern Ireland, the Traditional Unionist Voice, NI21 and the United Kingdom Independence Party.

More than three quarters of the members of the 3rd Northern Ireland Assembly were re-elected to the 4th: 83 MLAs had been members for all or part of the assembly's previous term. This included 11 individuals who became MLAs in the previous assembly by virtue of co-option. Twenty of the MLAs elected in 2011 were women. 25 new MLAs were elected to the assembly, 23% of the total.

== Party strengths ==
Party		Designation	May 2011 election	Jul 2015 end
●	Democratic Unionist Party	Unionist	38	38
●	Sinn Féin	Nationalist	29	28
●	Ulster Unionist Party (Note: The UUP withdrew from the Executive on 1 Sep 2015.)	Unionist	16	13
●	Social Democratic and Labour Party	Nationalist	14	14
●	Alliance Party of Northern Ireland	Other	8	8
	Green Party in Northern Ireland	Other	1	1
	Traditional Unionist Voice	Unionist	1	1
	Independent	Unionist	1	2
	NI21 (Note: In May 2014 NI21 announced its intention to designate as "Other" but technically remained designated Unionist.)	Unionist	-	1
	UKIP	Unionist	-	1
	Speaker (Note: Once elected, the Speaker relinquishes party affiliation.)	None	0	1
Totals by designation		Unionist	56	56
Totals by designation		Nationalist	43	42
Totals by designation		Other	9	9
Totals by designation		None	0	1
Total			108	
● = Northern Ireland Executive

=== Graphical representation ===
As elected, 5 May 2011

12 May 2011 to 27 Jan 2012

12 Jan 2015 to end

This is not the actual seating plan.

== Leadership ==
- Speaker: Mitchel McLaughlin (previously Sinn Féin) (from 12 Jan 2015) — William Hay (previously Democratic Unionist Party) (until 13 Oct 2014)
- Principal Deputy Speaker: Robin Newton (Democratic Unionist Party)
- Deputy Speaker: John Dallat (Social Democratic and Labour Party)
- Deputy Speaker: Roy Beggs Jr (Ulster Unionist Party)

=== Executive ===
- First Minister and Leader of Democratic Unionist Party: Peter Robinson
- Deputy First Minister: Martin McGuinness
  - Assembly Leader of Sinn Féin: Raymond McCartney
- Leader of the Social Democratic and Labour Party: Alasdair McDonnell
- Leader of the Alliance Party of Northern Ireland: David Ford

=== Opposition ===
- Leaders of the Ulster Unionist Party: Mike Nesbitt
- Leader of Green Party in Northern Ireland: Steven Agnew
- Leader of NI21: Basil McCrea
- Leader of Traditional Unionist Voice: Jim Allister
- Assembly Leader of UKIP: David McNarry

== MLAs by party ==
This is a list of MLAs elected to the Northern Ireland Assembly in the 2011 Northern Ireland Assembly election, sorted by party.

Not to be confused: Paul Girvan (South Antrim) and Paul Givan (Lagan Valley) are different people, although both were co-opted to replace retiring Democratic Unionist members of the last Assembly. Roy Beggs, Jr. (born 1962) is the son of the Ulster Unionist Roy Beggs (born 1936), a former Assembly member for North Antrim and former MP for East Antrim in the British House of Commons. Similarly Mark H. Durkan (b. 1978) is the nephew of the former SDLP leader Mark Durkan (b. 1960), who left the Assembly after his election in 2010 as MP for Foyle.

Party	Name	Constituency
Democratic Unionist Party (38)	Sydney Anderson	Upper Bann
Democratic Unionist Party (38)	Jonathan Bell	Strangford
Democratic Unionist Party (38)	Paula Bradley	Belfast North
Democratic Unionist Party (38)	Thomas Buchanan	West Tyrone
Democratic Unionist Party (38)	Gregory Campbell	East Londonderry
Democratic Unionist Party (38)	Trevor Clarke	South Antrim
Democratic Unionist Party (38)	Jonathan Craig	Lagan Valley
Democratic Unionist Party (38)	Sammy Douglas	Belfast East
Democratic Unionist Party (38)	Gordon Dunne	North Down
Democratic Unionist Party (38)	Alex Easton	North Down
Democratic Unionist Party (38)	Arlene Foster	Fermanagh and South Tyrone
Democratic Unionist Party (38)	Paul Frew	North Antrim
Democratic Unionist Party (38)	Paul Girvan	South Antrim
Democratic Unionist Party (38)	Paul Givan	Lagan Valley
Democratic Unionist Party (38)	Brenda Hale	Lagan Valley
Democratic Unionist Party (38)	Simon Hamilton	Strangford
Democratic Unionist Party (38)	David Hilditch	East Antrim
Democratic Unionist Party (38)	William Humphrey	Belfast North
Democratic Unionist Party (38)	William Irwin	Newry and Armagh
Democratic Unionist Party (38)	Pam Lewis	South Antrim
Democratic Unionist Party (38)	Gordon Lyons †	East Antrim
Democratic Unionist Party (38)	Nelson McCausland	Belfast North
Democratic Unionist Party (38)	Ian McCrea	Mid Ulster
Democratic Unionist Party (38)	David McIlveen	North Antrim
Democratic Unionist Party (38)	Michelle McIlveen	Strangford
Democratic Unionist Party (38)	Adrian McQuillan	East Londonderry
Democratic Unionist Party (38)	Gary Middleton ††	Foyle
Democratic Unionist Party (38)	Maurice Morrow	Fermanagh and South Tyrone
Democratic Unionist Party (38)	Stephen Moutray	Upper Bann
Democratic Unionist Party (38)	Robin Newton	Belfast East
Democratic Unionist Party (38)	Emma Pengelly †	Belfast South
Democratic Unionist Party (38)	Edwin Poots	Lagan Valley
Democratic Unionist Party (38)	George Robinson	East Londonderry
Democratic Unionist Party (38)	Peter Robinson	Belfast East
Democratic Unionist Party (38)	Alastair Ross	East Antrim
Democratic Unionist Party (38)	Mervyn Storey	North Antrim
Democratic Unionist Party (38)	Peter Weir	North Down
Democratic Unionist Party (38)	Jim Wells	South Down
Sinn Féin (28)	Cathal Boylan	Newry and Armagh
Sinn Féin (28)	Michaela Boyle	West Tyrone
Sinn Féin (28)	Megan Fearon †	Newry and Armagh
Sinn Féin (28)	Phil Flanagan	Fermanagh and South Tyrone
Sinn Féin (28)	Chris Hazzard †	South Down
Sinn Féin (28)	Gerry Kelly	Belfast North
Sinn Féin (28)	Seán Lynch	Fermanagh and South Tyrone
Sinn Féin (28)	Alex Maskey †	Belfast West
Sinn Féin (28)	Declan McAleer †	West Tyrone
Sinn Féin (28)	Fra McCann	Belfast West
Sinn Féin (28)	Jennifer McCann	Belfast West
Sinn Féin (28)	Raymond McCartney	Foyle
Sinn Féin (28)	Rosie McCorley †	Belfast West
Sinn Féin (28)	Barry McElduff	West Tyrone
Sinn Féin (28)	Bronwyn McGahan †	Fermanagh and South Tyrone
Sinn Féin (28)	Martin McGuinness	Mid Ulster
Sinn Féin (28)	Daithí McKay	North Antrim
Sinn Féin (28)	Maeve McLaughlin †	Foyle
Sinn Féin (28)	Oliver McMullan	East Antrim
Sinn Féin (28)	Ian Milne †	Mid Ulster
Sinn Féin (28)	Conor Murphy †	Newry and Armagh
Sinn Féin (28)	Carál Ní Chuilín	Belfast North
Sinn Féin (28)	Cathal Ó hOisín	East Londonderry
Sinn Féin (28)	Máirtín Ó Muilleoir †	Belfast South
Sinn Féin (28)	John O'Dowd	Upper Bann
Sinn Féin (28)	Michelle O'Neill	Mid Ulster
Sinn Féin (28)	Caitríona Ruane	South Down
Sinn Féin (28)	Pat Sheehan	Belfast West
Ulster Unionist Party (13)	Andy Allen †	Belfast East
Ulster Unionist Party (13)	Roy Beggs, Jr.	East Antrim
Ulster Unionist Party (13)	Adrian Cochrane-Watson †	South Antrim
Ulster Unionist Party (13)	Leslie Cree	North Down
Ulster Unionist Party (13)	Jo-Anne Dobson	Upper Bann
Ulster Unionist Party (13)	Sam Gardiner	Upper Bann
Ulster Unionist Party (13)	Ross Hussey	West Tyrone
Ulster Unionist Party (13)	Danny Kennedy	Newry and Armagh
Ulster Unionist Party (13)	Michael McGimpsey	Belfast South
Ulster Unionist Party (13)	Mike Nesbitt	Strangford
Ulster Unionist Party (13)	Sandra Overend	Mid Ulster
Ulster Unionist Party (13)	Alastair Patterson ††	Fermanagh and South Tyrone
Ulster Unionist Party (13)	Robin Swann	North Antrim
Social Democratic and Labour Party (14)	Alex Attwood	Belfast West
Social Democratic and Labour Party (14)	Dominic Bradley	Newry and Armagh
Social Democratic and Labour Party (14)	John Dallat	East Londonderry
Social Democratic and Labour Party (14)	Gerard Diver †	Foyle
Social Democratic and Labour Party (14)	Mark H. Durkan	Foyle
Social Democratic and Labour Party (14)	Colum Eastwood	Foyle
Social Democratic and Labour Party (14)	Claire Hanna †	Belfast South
Social Democratic and Labour Party (14)	Dolores Kelly	Upper Bann
Social Democratic and Labour Party (14)	Daniel McCrossan †	West Tyrone
Social Democratic and Labour Party (14)	Patsy McGlone	Mid Ulster
Social Democratic and Labour Party (14)	Karen McKevitt	South Down
Social Democratic and Labour Party (14)	Fearghal McKinney †	Belfast South
Social Democratic and Labour Party (14)	Alban Maginness	Belfast North
Social Democratic and Labour Party (14)	Seán Rogers †	South Down
Alliance Party of Northern Ireland (8)	Judith Cochrane	Belfast East
Alliance Party of Northern Ireland (8)	Stewart Dickson	East Antrim
Alliance Party of Northern Ireland (8)	Stephen Farry	North Down
Alliance Party of Northern Ireland (8)	David Ford	South Antrim
Alliance Party of Northern Ireland (8)	Anna Lo	Belfast South
Alliance Party of Northern Ireland (8)	Trevor Lunn	Lagan Valley
Alliance Party of Northern Ireland (8)	Chris Lyttle	Belfast East
Alliance Party of Northern Ireland (8)	Kieran McCarthy	Strangford
Green Party in Northern Ireland (1)	Steven Agnew	North Down
Traditional Unionist Voice (1)	Jim Allister	North Antrim
Independent (2)	John McCallister ‡	South Down
Independent (2)	Claire Sugden †	East Londonderry
NI21 (1)	Basil McCrea ‡	Lagan Valley
UKIP (1)	David McNarry ‡	Strangford
Speaker (1)	Mitchel McLaughlin ‡	South Antrim

† Co-opted to replace an elected MLA

‡ Changed affiliation during the term

== MLAs by constituency ==
The list is given in alphabetical order by constituency.

Members of the 4th Northern Ireland Assembly
Constituency	Name	Party
Belfast East	Andy Allen †	Ulster Unionist Party
Belfast East	Judith Cochrane	Alliance Party of Northern Ireland
Belfast East	Sammy Douglas	Democratic Unionist Party
Belfast East	Chris Lyttle	Alliance Party of Northern Ireland
Belfast East	Robin Newton	Democratic Unionist Party
Belfast East	Peter Robinson	Democratic Unionist Party
Belfast North	Paula Bradley	Democratic Unionist Party
Belfast North	William Humphrey	Democratic Unionist Party
Belfast North	Gerry Kelly	Sinn Féin
Belfast North	Nelson McCausland	Democratic Unionist Party
Belfast North	Alban Maginness	Social Democratic and Labour Party
Belfast North	Carál Ní Chuilín	Sinn Féin
Belfast South	Claire Hanna †	Social Democratic and Labour Party
Belfast South	Anna Lo	Alliance Party of Northern Ireland
Belfast South	Michael McGimpsey	Ulster Unionist Party
Belfast South	Fearghal McKinney †	Social Democratic and Labour Party
Belfast South	Máirtín Ó Muilleoir †	Sinn Féin
Belfast South	Emma Pengelly †	Democratic Unionist Party
Belfast West	Alex Attwood	Social Democratic and Labour Party
Belfast West	Fra McCann	Sinn Féin
Belfast West	Jennifer McCann	Sinn Féin
Belfast West	Alex Maskey †	Sinn Féin
Belfast West	Paul Maskey	Sinn Féin
Belfast West	Pat Sheehan	Sinn Féin
East Antrim	Roy Beggs, Jr.	Ulster Unionist Party
East Antrim	Stewart Dickson	Alliance Party of Northern Ireland
East Antrim	David Hilditch	Democratic Unionist Party
East Antrim	Gordon Lyons †	Democratic Unionist Party
East Antrim	Oliver McMullan	Sinn Féin
East Antrim	Alastair Ross	Democratic Unionist Party
East Londonderry	Gregory Campbell	Democratic Unionist Party
East Londonderry	John Dallat	Social Democratic and Labour Party
East Londonderry	Adrian McQuillan	Democratic Unionist Party
East Londonderry	Cathal Ó hOisín	Sinn Féin
East Londonderry	George Robinson	Democratic Unionist Party
East Londonderry	Claire Sugden †	Independent
Fermanagh and South Tyrone	Tom Elliott	Ulster Unionist Party
Fermanagh and South Tyrone	Phil Flanagan	Sinn Féin
Fermanagh and South Tyrone	Arlene Foster	Democratic Unionist Party
Fermanagh and South Tyrone	Bronwyn McGahan †	Sinn Féin
Fermanagh and South Tyrone	Seán Lynch	Sinn Féin
Fermanagh and South Tyrone	Maurice Morrow	Democratic Unionist Party
Foyle	Mark H. Durkan	Social Democratic and Labour Party
Foyle	Colum Eastwood	Social Democratic and Labour Party
Foyle	Gary Middleton ††	Democratic Unionist Party
Foyle	Raymond McCartney	Sinn Féín
Foyle	Maeve McLaughlin †	Sinn Féín
Foyle	Pat Ramsey	Social Democratic and Labour Party
Lagan Valley	Jonathan Craig	Democratic Unionist Party
Lagan Valley	Paul Givan	Democratic Unionist Party
Lagan Valley	Brenda Hale	Democratic Unionist Party
Lagan Valley	Trevor Lunn	Alliance Party of Northern Ireland
Lagan Valley	Basil McCrea ‡	NI21
Lagan Valley	Edwin Poots	Democratic Unionist Party
Mid Ulster	Ian McCrea	Democratic Unionist Party
Mid Ulster	Patsy McGlone	Social Democratic and Labour Party
Mid Ulster	Martin McGuinness	Sinn Féin
Mid Ulster	Ian Milne †	Sinn Féin
Mid Ulster	Michelle O'Neill	Sinn Féin
Mid Ulster	Sandra Overend	Ulster Unionist Party
Newry and Armagh	Cathal Boylan	Sinn Féin
Newry and Armagh	Dominic Bradley	Social Democratic and Labour Party
Newry and Armagh	Megan Fearon †	Sinn Féin
Newry and Armagh	William Irwin	Democratic Unionist Party
Newry and Armagh	Danny Kennedy	Ulster Unionist Party
Newry and Armagh	Conor Murphy ††	Sinn Féin
North Antrim	Jim Allister	Traditional Unionist Voice
North Antrim	Paul Frew	Democratic Unionist Party
North Antrim	David McIlveen	Democratic Unionist Party
North Antrim	Daithí McKay	Sinn Féin
North Antrim	Mervyn Storey	Democratic Unionist Party
North Antrim	Robin Swann	Ulster Unionist Party
North Down	Steven Agnew	Green Party in Northern Ireland
North Down	Leslie Cree	Ulster Unionist Party
North Down	Gordon Dunne	Democratic Unionist Party
North Down	Alex Easton	Democratic Unionist Party
North Down	Stephen Farry	Alliance Party of Northern Ireland
North Down	Peter Weir	Democratic Unionist Party
South Antrim	Trevor Clarke	Democratic Unionist Party
South Antrim	David Ford	Alliance Party of Northern Ireland
South Antrim	Paul Girvan	Democratic Unionist Party
South Antrim	Adrian Cochrane-Watson †	Ulster Unionist Party
South Antrim	Pam Lewis	Democratic Unionist Party
South Antrim	Mitchel McLaughlin ‡	Speaker
South Down	Chris Hazzard †	Sinn Féin
South Down	John McCallister ‡	Independent
South Down	Karen McKevitt	Social Democratic and Labour Party
South Down	Seán Rogers †	Social Democratic and Labour Party
South Down	Caitríona Ruane	Sinn Féin
South Down	Jim Wells	Democratic Unionist Party
Strangford	Jonathan Bell	Democratic Unionist Party
Strangford	Simon Hamilton	Democratic Unionist Party
Strangford	Kieran McCarthy	Alliance Party of Northern Ireland
Strangford	Michelle McIlveen	Democratic Unionist Party
Strangford	David McNarry ‡	UKIP
Strangford	Mike Nesbitt	Ulster Unionist Party
Upper Bann	Sydney Anderson	Democratic Unionist Party
Upper Bann	Jo-Anne Dobson	Ulster Unionist Party
Upper Bann	Sam Gardiner	Ulster Unionist Party
Upper Bann	Dolores Kelly	Social Democratic and Labour Party
Upper Bann	Stephen Moutray	Democratic Unionist Party
Upper Bann	John O'Dowd	Sinn Féin
West Tyrone	Michaela Boyle	Sinn Féin
West Tyrone	Thomas Buchanan	Democratic Unionist Party
West Tyrone	Ross Hussey	Ulster Unionist Party
West Tyrone	Declan McAleer †	Sinn Féin
West Tyrone	Daniel McCrossan †	Social Democratic and Labour Party
West Tyrone	Barry McElduff	Sinn Féin

† Co-opted to replace an elected MLA ‡ Changed affiliation during the term

== New members elected in May 2011 ==
Twenty-five members of the third Assembly who were sitting at its dissolution on 24 March 2011 were succeeded by new members after the election of 5 May 2011. Seventeen sitting members did not present themselves for re-election and another eight were defeated at the polls. One re-elected member had been elected with a different affiliation in 2007.

The numbers indicate the percentage of votes each member received in the first round of counting under the Single Transferable Vote in the 2011 election, and the round which decided his or her election or defeat.

This is a sortable table arranged alphabetically by the new member's surname. In some constituencies (Foyle, West Tyrone and Fermanagh & South Tyrone) where it is not possible to couple a single outgoing member by party with a single successor, the incoming members are arranged alphabetically (so the second one may be out of alphabetic order with the rest of the table) and the outgoing members are arranged arbitrarily.

Outgoing member(s)	Party	1st pref	Round	Constituency	New Member(s)	Party	1st pref	Round
Brian Wilson (retiring)	Green Party in N. Ireland	—	—	North Down	Steven Agnew	Green	7.9%	11
Declan O'Loan	SDLP	9.1%	9	North Antrim	Jim Allister	Trad. U. Voice	10.1%	9
Claire McGill (retiring)	Sinn Féin	—	—	West Tyrone	Michaela Boyle	Sinn Féin	12.9%	4
Fred Cobain	Ulster Unionist	8.2%	7	Belfast North	Paula Bradley	DUP	10.4%	6
Allan Bresland; Kieran Deeny (retiring)	Democratic Unionist; Independent	10.3% —	0 —	West Tyrone	Joe Byrne; Ross Hussey	SDLP; UUP	8.5% 10.4%	5
Dawn Purvis	Ind. (elected as Prog. U.)	5.3%	11	Belfast East	Judith Cochrane	Alliance	13.4%	7
Reg Empey (retiring); Lord Empey	Ulster Unionist	—	—	Belfast East	Michael Copeland	UUP	6.8%	11
Seán Neeson (retiring)	Alliance	—	—	East Antrim	Stewart Dickson	Alliance	10.0%	9
George Savage (retiring)	Ulster Unionist	—	—	Upper Bann	Jo-Anne Dobson	UUP	7.9%	7
Wallace Browne (retiring); Baron Browne of Belmont	Democratic Unionist	—	—	Belfast East	Sammy Douglas	DUP	8.3%	11
Alan McFarland	Ind. (elected as UUP)	6.7%	9	North Down	Gordon Dunne	DUP	13.3%	2
Pól Callaghan [replaced Mark Durkan, MP] Mary Bradley (retiring)	SDLP	6.8% —	4 —	Foyle	Mark H. Durkan; Colum Eastwood	SDLP	12.8% 7.6%	4; 7
Tommy Gallagher	SDLP	9.6%	6	Fermanagh & South Tyrone	Phil Flanagan	Sinn Féin	10.6%	6
Gerry McHugh (retiring)	Ind. (elected as SF)	—	—	Fermanagh & South Tyrone	Seán Lynch	Sinn Féin	10.7%	6
Paul Butler (retiring)	Sinn Féin	—	—	Lagan Valley	Brenda Hale	DUP	8.2%	7
Thomas Burns	SDLP	10.6%	0	South Antrim	Pam Lewis	DUP	8.9%	4
Ian Paisley, PC (retiring); Lord Bannside	Democratic Unionist	—	—	North Antrim	David McIlveen	DUP	8.1%	8
P.J. Bradley (retiring)	SDLP	—	—	South Down	Karen McKevitt	SDLP	9.0%	9
Ken Robinson (retiring)	Ulster Unionist	—	—	East Antrim	Oliver McMullan	Sinn Féin	8.2%	10
Simpson Gibson (retiring) [replaced Jim Shannon]	Democratic Unionist	—	—	Strangford	Mike Nesbitt	UUP	11.0%	6
Billy Leonard (retiring) [replaced Francie Brolly]	Sinn Féin (suspended)	—	—	East Londonderry	Cathal Ó hOisín	Sinn Féin	13.5%	6
Billy Armstrong (retiring)	Ulster Unionist	—	—	Mid Ulster	Sandra Overend	UUP	10.3%	6
Robert Coulter (retiring)	Ulster Unionist	—	—	North Antrim	Robin Swann	UUP	6.2%	9

=== Member returning with a different affiliation ===
David McClarty, originally elected from East Londonderry as an Ulster Unionist, although not re-nominated by the UUP in 2011, stood successfully for re-election as an independent. This reduced the UUP's strength from 2007, while keeping independent strength in the Assembly at one (as Kieran Deeny, the retiring independent member, was not succeeded in West Tyrone by another independent). McClarty decided not to re-join the UUP after his re-election.

== Changes since the election ==
=== † Co-options ===
Date co-opted	Constituency	Party	Outgoing	Co-optee	Reason
1 April 2012	South Down	SDLP	Margaret Ritchie	Seán Rogers	Margaret Ritchie resigned to concentrate on her role as a Member of Parliament.
13 April 2012	South Down	Sinn Féin	Willie Clarke	Chris Hazzard	Willie Clarke resigned to concentrate on his role as a Down District Councillor.
14 June 2012	Foyle	Sinn Féin	Martina Anderson	Maeve McLaughlin	Martina Anderson resigned after becoming a member of the European Parliament.
7 July 2012	Newry and Armagh	Sinn Féin	Conor Murphy	Megan Fearon	Conor Murphy resigned to concentrate on his role as a Member of Parliament.
7 July 2012	West Tyrone	Sinn Féin	Pat Doherty	Declan McAleer	Pat Doherty resigned to concentrate on his role as a Member of Parliament.
7 July 2012	Belfast West	Sinn Féin	Paul Maskey	Rosie McCorley	Paul Maskey resigned to concentrate on his role as a Member of Parliament.
7 July 2012	Fermanagh and South Tyrone	Sinn Féin	Michelle Gildernew	Bronwyn McGahan	Michelle Gildernew resigned to concentrate on his role as a Member of Parliament.
8 April 2013	Mid Ulster	Sinn Féin	Francie Molloy	Ian Milne	Francie Molloy resigned to concentrate on his role as a Member of Parliament.
12 September 2013	Belfast South	SDLP	Conall McDevitt	Fearghal McKinney	Conall McDevitt resigned.
6 May 2014	East Londonderry	Ind. Unionist	David McClarty	Claire Sugden	David McClarty died.
20 October 2014	Foyle	DUP	William Hay	Maurice Devenney	William Hay resigned.
22 October 2014	Belfast South	Sinn Féin	Alex Maskey	Máirtín Ó Muilleoir	Alex Maskey resigned in order to be transferred to Belfast West.
3 November 2014	Belfast West	Sinn Féin	Sue Ramsey	Alex Maskey	Sue Ramsey resigned.
13 April 2015	Foyle	DUP	Maurice Devenney	Gary Middleton	Maurice Devenney resigned.
8 June 2015	Newry and Armagh	Sinn Féin	Mickey Brady	Conor Murphy	Mickey Brady was elected as Member of Parliament for Newry and Armagh in the 2015 general election.
29 June 2015	South Antrim	UUP	Danny Kinahan	Adrian Cochrane-Watson	Danny Kinahan was elected as Member of Parliament for South Antrim in the 2015 general election.
29 June 2015	Fermanagh and South Tyrone	UUP	Tom Elliott	Neil Somerville	Tom Elliott was elected as Member of Parliament for Fermanagh and South Tyrone in the 2015 general election.
29 June 2015	Belfast South	SDLP	Alasdair McDonnell	Claire Hanna	Alasdair McDonnell resigned to concentrate on his role as a Member of Parliament.
19 August 2015	East Antrim	DUP	Sammy Wilson	Gordon Lyons	Sammy Wilson resigned to concentrate on his role as a Member of Parliament.
15 September 2015	Belfast East	UUP	Michael Copeland	Andy Allen	Michael Copeland resigned.
28 September 2015	Belfast South	DUP	Jimmy Spratt	Emma Pengelly	Jimmy Spratt resigned.
7 January 2016	Foyle	SDLP	Pat Ramsey	Gerard Diver	Pat Ramsey resigned.
7 January 2016	West Tyrone	SDLP	Joe Byrne	Daniel McCrossan	Joe Byrne resigned.
27 January 2016	Fermanagh and South Tyrone	UUP	Neil Somerville	Alastair Patterson	Neil Somerville resigned.

=== ‡ Changes in affiliation ===
Date	Constituency	Name	Previous affiliation	New affiliation	Circumstance
12 May 2011	Foyle	William Hay	DUP	Speaker	William Hay elected Speaker of the Assembly at its first sitting.
27 January 2012	Strangford	David McNarry	UUP	Ind. Unionist	David McNarry suspended from the UUP for nine months after an investigation by the party.
4 October 2012	Strangford	David McNarry	Ind. Unionist	UKIP	David McNarry joined UKIP becoming the party's first Northern Ireland MLA.
14 February 2013	South Down	John McCallister	UUP	Ind. Unionist	John McCallister resigned from the UUP after it formed an electoral pact with the DUP.
15 February 2013	Lagan Valley	Basil McCrea	UUP	Ind. Unionist	Basil McCrea resigned from the UUP after it formed an electoral pact with the DUP.
6 June 2013	South Down	John McCallister	Ind. Unionist	NI21	John McCallister along with McCrea established a new political party.
6 June 2013	Lagan Valley	Basil McCrea	Ind. Unionist	NI21	Basil McCrea along with McCallister established a new political party.
3 July 2014	South Down	John McCallister	NI21	Ind. Unionist	John McCallister resigns from NI21 over differences with the party leadership regarding an investigation into sexual wrongdoing by party leader, Basil McCrea.
12 January 2015	South Antrim	Mitchel McLaughlin	Sinn Féin	Speaker	Mitchel McLaughlin elected Speaker of the Assembly following the retirement of William Hay.

== See also ==
- Members of the Northern Ireland Assembly elected in 2007
- 2011 Northern Ireland Assembly election
- Executive of the 4th Northern Ireland Assembly
