= 2001 Derry City Council election =

Local govt election in Northern Ireland

- 7 June 2001

All 30 seats to Derry City Council 16 seats needed for a majority
	First party	Second party	Third party
Party	SDLP	Sinn Féin	DUP
Seats won	14	10	4
Seat change	0	▲2	0
	Fourth party	Fifth party
Party	UUP	Ind. Unionist
Seats won	2	0
Seat change	▼1	▼1
- Party with the most votes by district.

Elections to Derry City Council were held on 7 June 2001 on the same day as the other Northern Irish local government elections. The election used five district electoral areas to elect a total of 30 councillors.

== Election results ==
Derry City Council Election Result 2001
Party	Seats	Gains	Losses	Net gain/loss	Seats %	Votes %	Votes	+/−
SDLP	14	1	1	0	46.7	43.4	20,872	▼0.3
Sinn Féin	10	2	0	▲2	33.3	30.3	14,547	▲2.6
DUP	4	0	0	0	13.3	14.3	6,874	▲1.7
UUP	2	0	1	▼1	6.7	6.4	3,069	▼2.3
Independent	0	0	0	0	0.0	4.4	2,094	▲4.3
Alliance	0	0	0	0	0.0	0.9	436	▲0.9
PUP	0	0	0	0	0.0	0.3	153	▲0.3

Note: "Votes" are the first preference votes.

== Districts summary ==
Results of the Derry City Council election, 2001 by district
Ward	%	Cllrs	%	Cllrs	%	Cllrs	%	Cllrs	%	Cllrs	Total Cllrs
Ward	SDLP		Sinn Féin		DUP		UUP		Others		Total Cllrs
Cityside	45.5	2	51.1	3	0.0	0	0.0	0	3.4	0	5
Northland	54.0	4	39.0	3	0.0	0	0.0	0	7.0	0	7
Rural	40.9	3	16.5	1	24.3	1	16.6	1	1.7	0	6
Shantallow	56.1	3	38.6	2	0.0	0	0.0	0	5.3	0	5
Waterside	20.7	2	12.7	1	43.3	3	13.9	1	9.4	0	7
Total	43.4	14	30.3	10	14.3	4	6.4	2	5.6	0	30

== District results ==
=== Cityside ===
1997: 3 x Sinn Féin, 2 x SDLP
2001: 3 x Sinn Féin, 2 x SDLP
1997-2001 Change: No change

Cityside - 5 seats
Party	Candidate	FPv%	Count					
Party	Candidate	FPv%	1	2	3	4	5	6
SDLP	Pat Ramsey*	18.26%	1,210					
SDLP	Jim Clifford*	17.75%	1,176					
Sinn Féin	Cathal Crumley*	16.49%	1,093	1,122				
Sinn Féin	Peter Anderson*	14.92%	989	1,015	1,022.02	1,025.8	1,474.8	
Sinn Féin	Barney O'Hagan	10.32%	684	698	701.33	703.61	847.71	1,181.34
SDLP	Liam Boyle	9.49%	629	684	765.63	817.35	831.51	867.15
Sinn Féin	Donncha MacNiallais	9.33%	618	642	647.67	650.97		
Independent	Shauna Deery	3.44%	228					
Electorate: 9,244 Valid: 6,627 (71.69%) Spoilt: 303 Quota: 1,105 Turnout: 6,930 (74.97%)

=== Northland ===
1997: 5 x SDLP, 2 x Sinn Féin
2001: 4 x SDLP, 3 x Sinn Féin
1997-2001 Change: Sinn Féin gain from SDLP

Northland - 7 seats
Party	Candidate	FPv%	Count				
Party	Candidate	FPv%	1	2	3	4	5
SDLP	Kathleen McCloskey*	13.88%	1,528				
SDLP	John Kerr*	11.34%	1,248	1,276.9	1,384.9		
Sinn Féin	Mary Nelis*	8.90%	980	988.6	1,034.6	1,698.6	
Sinn Féin	Maeve McLaughlin	11.27%	1,240	1,247.1	1,291.1	1,430.1	
Sinn Féin	William Page	10.27%	1,130	1,132	1,148	1,200	1,506.74
SDLP	Helen Quigley	9.88%	1,087	1,125.5	1,267.5	1,278.5	1,283.89
SDLP	Sean Carr	10.51%	1,157	1,176.1	1,254.1	1,265.1	1,267.06
SDLP	James McClintock	8.38%	922	959.4	1,041.4	1,050.4	1,053.34
Sinn Féin	Gerry MacLochlainn	8.52%	938	940	976		
Independent	William Temple	3.70%	407	407.4			
Independent	Colm Bryce	2.49%	274	275.1			
Independent	Daniel Bradley	0.74%	82	83.3			
Independent	Catherine Harper	0.13%	14	14.4			
Electorate: 16,402 Valid: 11,007 (67.11%) Spoilt: 323 Quota: 1,376 Turnout: 11,330 (69.08%)

=== Rural ===
1997: 3 x SDLP, 2 x UUP, 1 x DUP
2001: 3 x SDLP, 1 x UUP, 1 x DUP, 1 x Sinn Féin
1997-2001 Change: Sinn Féin gain from UUP

Rural - 6 seats
Party	Candidate	FPv%	Count									
Party	Candidate	FPv%	1	2	3	4	5	6	7	8	9	10
DUP	William Hay*	15.37%	1,511									
SDLP	Annie Courtney*	14.69%	1,444									
SDLP	Thomas Conway	12.96%	1,274	1,304	1,304	1,550						
UUP	Andrew Davidson*	10.93%	1,074	1,131	1,138.07	1,141.07	1,143.11	1,552.11				
Sinn Féin	Paul Fleming	9.59%	943	955	955	985	994.52	995.52	1,574.6			
SDLP	Jim McKeever*	8.10%	796	822	822.07	981.07	1,100.75	1,106.75	1,156.43	1,266.33	1,234.33	1,268.68
DUP	Bill Irwin	8.94%	879	883	968.61	970.61	970.61	1,086.89	1,086.89	1,087.19	1,224.19	1,224.37
Sinn Féin	James Kelly	6.89%	677	682	682	698	710.24	711.24				
UUP	Ernest Hamilton*	5.64%	554	560	569.66	572.66	572.66					
SDLP	Brenda Stevenson	5.20%	511	519	519							
Alliance	Brian Kelly	1.69%	166									
Electorate: 14,567 Valid: 9,829 (67.47%) Spoilt: 222 Quota: 1,405 Turnout: 10,051 (69.00%)

=== Shantallow ===
1997: 3 x SDLP, 2 x Sinn Féin
2001: 3 x SDLP, 2 x Sinn Féin
1997-2001 Change: No change

Shantallow - 5 seats
Party	Candidate	FPv%	Count				
Party	Candidate	FPv%	1	2	3	4	5
SDLP	Mary Bradley*	22.53%	2,304				
SDLP	Shaun Gallagher*	12.58%	1,287	1,686.33	1,790.33		
Sinn Féin	Tony Hassan*	12.09%	1,237	1,262.65	1,336	2,242	
Sinn Féin	Gearóid Ó hEára*	12.10%	1,238	1,256.09	1,581.52	1,723.52	
SDLP	William O'Connell*	11.10%	1,135	1,225.45	1,324.58	1,342.63	1,402.63
SDLP	Ciaran O'Doherty	9.94%	1,017	1,048.86	1,249.29	1,264.83	1,285.83
Sinn Féin	Oliver Green	10.60%	1,084	1,096.42	1,131.23		
Independent	Charles McDaid	5.30%	542	549.56			
Sinn Féin	Jean McGinty	3.75%	384	390.48			
Electorate: 15,381 Valid: 10,228 (66.50%) Spoilt: 316 Quota: 1,705 Turnout: 10,544 (68.55%)

=== Waterside ===
1997: 3 x DUP, 1 x SDLP, 1 x UUP, 1 x Sinn Féin, 1 x Independent Unionist
2001: 3 x DUP, 2 x SDLP, 1 x UUP, 1 x Sinn Féin
1997-2001 Change: SDLP gain from Independent Unionist

Waterside - 7 seats
Party	Candidate	FPv%	Count										
Party	Candidate	FPv%	1	2	3	4	5	6	7	8	9	10	11
DUP	Gregory Campbell*	18.22%	1,887										
SDLP	Gerard Diver	12.85%	1,330										
DUP	Joe Miller*	11.76%	1,218	1,382.16									
Sinn Féin	Lynn Fleming*	9.41%	974	974	974	983	983	985.32	1,003.96	1,307.96			
UUP	Mary Hamilton	9.48%	982	1,028.08	1,034.96	1,036.96	1,089.68	1,124.96	1,165.2	1,165.2	1,515.72		
DUP	Mildred Garfield*	6.86%	710	985.84	1,011.44	1,013.44	1,015.08	1,060.24	1,070.48	1,070.48	1,083.92	1,129.51	1,263.11
SDLP	Anne Marie McDaid	7.89%	817	817	817.16	828.16	828.48	830.48	915.64	945.64	948.64	970.95	1,108.71
DUP	Drew Thompson	6.46%	669	697.16	741	743.32	747.12	770.88	772.52	772.84	784.88	844.05	1,019.67
Independent	James Guy*	4.67%	484	514.4	516.96	522.96	527.28	541.16	631.48	634.48	685.88	778.03	
UUP	James McCorkell	3.49%	361	373.16	375.88	377.88	410.8	430.12	454.12	454.12			
Sinn Féin	Francis O'Deorain	3.26%	338	338.64	338.64	342.64	342.64	342.64	342.64				
Alliance	Colm Cavanagh	2.61%	270	278	278.32	289.32	289.96	301.6					
PUP	Catherine Cooke	1.48%	153	170.6	171.08	176.08	177.08						
UUP	Gordon Hill	0.95%	98	104.4	105.36	106.36							
Independent	William Webster	0.61%	63	63.32	63.32								
Electorate: 15,882 Valid: 10,354 (65.19%) Spoilt: 226 Quota: 1,295 Turnout: 10,580 (66.62%)
