= 2005 Derry City Council election =

Local govt election in Northern Ireland

- 5 May 2005

All 30 seats to Derry City Council 16 seats needed for a majority
	First party	Second party	Third party
Party	SDLP	Sinn Féin	DUP
Seats won	14	10	5
Seat change	0	0	▲1
	Fourth party
Party	UUP
Seats won	1
Seat change	▼1
- Party with the most votes by district.

Elections to Derry City Council were held on 5 May 2005 on the same day as the other Northern Irish local government elections. The election used five district electoral areas to elect a total of 30 councillors.

== Election results ==
Derry City Council Election Result 2005
Party	Seats	Gains	Losses	Net gain/loss	Seats %	Votes %	Votes	+/−
SDLP	14	0	0	0	46.7	41.0	18,467	▼2.4
Sinn Féin	10	0	0	0	33.3	32.8	14,744	▲2.5
DUP	5	1	0	▲1	16.7	16.1	7,265	▲1.8
UUP	1	0	1	▼1	3.3	4.4	2,000	▼2.0
Socialist Environmental	0	0	0	0	0.0	2.9	1,321	New
Independent	0	0	0	0	0.0	2.7	1,202	▼1.7

Note: "Votes" are the first preference votes.

== Districts summary ==
Results of the Derry City Council election, 2005 by district
Ward	%	Cllrs	%	Cllrs	%	Cllrs	%	Cllrs	%	Cllrs	Total Cllrs
Ward	SDLP		Sinn Féin		DUP		UUP		Others		Total Cllrs
Cityside	35.8	2	53.2	3	0.0	0	0.0	0	11.0	0	5
Northland	54.2	4	40.1	3	0.0	0	0.0	0	5.7	0	7
Rural	35.8	3	18.3	1	28.0	2	10.2	0	7.7	0	6
Shantallow	54.1	3	42.4	2	0.0	0	0.0	0	3.5	0	5
Waterside	22.1	2	16.3	1	48.7	3	10.8	1	2.1	0	7
Total	41.0	14	32.8	10	16.1	5	4.4	1	5.7	0	30

== District results ==
=== Cityside ===
2001: 3 x Sinn Féin, 2 x SDLP
2005: 3 x Sinn Féin, 2 x SDLP
2001-2005 Change: No change

Cityside - 5 seats
Party	Candidate	FPv%	Count						
Party	Candidate	FPv%	1	2	3	4	5	6	7
SDLP	Pat Ramsey*	16.01%	980	1,016	1,104				
SDLP	Jim Clifford*	11.79%	722	742	1,035				
Sinn Féin	Peter Anderson*	16.29%	997	1,013	1,034				
Sinn Féin	Patricia Logue	13.08%	801	811	822	875	878.76	879.16	884.04
Sinn Féin	Kevin Campbell	11.37%	696	705	751	851	859.46	859.98	861.81
Sinn Féin	Barney O'Hagan*	12.46%	763	781	790	839	851.22	851.78	854.83
Independent	Gary Donnelly	8.05%	493	516	528				
SDLP	Liam Boyle	7.97%	488	512					
Socialist Environmental	Liam Friel	2.97%	182						
Electorate: 8,655 Valid: 6,122 (70.73%) Spoilt: 222 Quota: 1,021 Turnout: 6,344 (73.30%)

=== Northland ===
2001: 4 x SDLP, 3 x Sinn Féin
2005: 4 x SDLP, 3 x Sinn Féin
2001-2005 Change: No change

Northland - 7 seats
Party	Candidate	FPv%	Count								
Party	Candidate	FPv%	1	2	3	4	5	6	7	8	9
SDLP	Mark H. Durkan	23.25%	2,369								
SDLP	Seana Hume	7.73%	788	1,405.76							
Sinn Féin	Gerry MacLochlainn	11.03%	1,124	1,160.96	1,173.92	1,178.12	1,388.12				
Sinn Féin	William Page*	9.82%	1,001	1,031.24	1,038.24	1,039.84	1,078.94	1,114.42	1,593.42		
Sinn Féin	Maeve McLaughlin*	8.33%	849	873	883.96	885.96	1,053.92	1,114.32	1,303.32		
SDLP	Helen Quigley*	10.59%	1,079	1,168.28	1,183.24	1,198.94	1,202.94	1,273.16	1,282.16		
SDLP	Sean Carr*	6.25%	637	797.32	807.28	840.28	852.54	937.32	945.74	969.74	986.74
SDLP	John Kerr*	6.41%	653	745.16	756.52	816.62	824.02	866.44	874.56	892.56	904.56
Sinn Féin	Joanne McDaid	6.18%	630	638.64	643.64	645.24	679.78	735.78			
Socialist Environmental	Colm Bryce	3.46%	353	367.4	508.8	510.5	517.98				
Sinn Féin	Sharon Duddy	4.77%	486	493.68	497.16	498.16					
Socialist Environmental	Oisin Kehoe	2.34%	221	232.04							
Electorate: 15,278 Valid: 10,190 (66.70%) Spoilt: 280 Quota: 1,274 Turnout: 10,470 (68.53%)

=== Rural ===
2001: 3 x SDLP, 1 x DUP, 1 x Sinn Féin, 1 x UUP
2005: 3 x SDLP, 2 x DUP, 1 x Sinn Féin
2001-2005 Change: DUP gain from UUP

Rural - 6 seats
Party	Candidate	FPv%	Count								
Party	Candidate	FPv%	1	2	3	4	5	6	7	8	9
DUP	William Hay*	14.70%	1,413								
SDLP	Thomas Conway*	14.24%	1,368	1,368.12	1,443.12						
SDLP	Liam Boyle	10.56%	1,015	1,015.06	1,089.1	1,133.74	1,237.67	1,371.6	1,382.6		
Sinn Féin	Paul Fleming*	11.83%	1,137	1,137.02	1,157.04	1,159.83	1,172.83	1,232.85	1,232.85	1,772.85	
DUP	Maurice Devenney	13.27%	1,275	1,296.16	1,302.2	1,302.2	1,304.24	1,313.26	1,363.22	1,366.24	1,366.24
SDLP	Jim McKeever*	7.02%	675	675.12	715.12	717.91	948.79	1,051.76	1,082.8	1,141.83	1,266.15
UUP	Ernest Hamilton	5.55%	533	536.5	560.54	560.54	565.56	573.6	940.48	942.48	943.22
Sinn Féin	Thomas McGlinchey	6.48%	623	623.02	635.02	638.74	652.67	679.55	679.55		
UUP	William Storey	4.68%	450	451.94	467.98	467.98	474.98	488.04			
Socialist Environmental	Eamonn McCann	3.86%	371	371.18	415.22	418.94	430.89				
SDLP	Thomas Harty	3.96%	381	381.12	401.12	407.63					
Independent	Annie Courtney*	3.84%	369	369.24							
Electorate: 14,966 Valid: 9,610 (64.21%) Spoilt: 207 Quota: 1,373 Turnout: 9,817 (65.60%)

=== Shantallow ===
2001: 3 x SDLP, 2 x Sinn Féin
2005: 3 x SDLP, 2 x Sinn Féin
2001-2005 Change: No change

Shantallow - 5 seats
Party	Candidate	FPv%	Count					
Party	Candidate	FPv%	1	2	3	4	5	6
SDLP	Mary Bradley*	22.51%	2,180					
SDLP	Colum Eastwood	13.54%	1,311	1,588.42	1,630.42			
SDLP	Shaun Gallagher*	11.56%	1,119	1,273.7	1,357.32	1,924.32		
Sinn Féin	Tony Hassan*	9.55%	925	945.02	980.32	992.88	1,009.88	1,614.64
Sinn Féin	Elisha McLaughlin	13.05%	1,264	1,278.04	1,311.56	1,330.12	1,344.12	1,457.46
Sinn Féin	Gearóid Ó hEára*	11.56%	1,119	1,132.52	1,174.6	1,189.72	1,218.72	1,328.76
Sinn Féin	Oliver Green	8.24%	798	809.18	838.22	850.56	872.56	
SDLP	Helena Kearney	6.48%	627	666.52	703.08			
Independent	Tommy Mullan	3.51%	340	357.94				
Electorate: 15,060 Valid: 9,683 (64.30%) Spoilt: 227 Quota: 1,614 Turnout: 9,910 (65.80%)

=== Waterside ===
2001: 3 x DUP, 2 x SDLP, 1 x Sinn Féin, 1 x UUP
2005: 3 x DUP, 2 x SDLP, 1 x Sinn Féin, 1 x UUP
2001-2005 Change: No change

Waterside - 7 seats
Party	Candidate	FPv%	Count					
Party	Candidate	FPv%	1	2	3	4	5	6
DUP	Gregory Campbell*	16.19%	1,521					
SDLP	Gerard Diver*	16.05%	1,508					
DUP	Joe Miller*	12.64%	1,187					
Sinn Féin	Lynn Fleming*	11.54%	1,084	1,085.84	1,107.62	1,126.84	1,524.71	
SDLP	Martin Reilly	6.04%	567	568.15	833.69	910.17	958.45	1,123.15
DUP	Drew Thompson	10.50%	986	1,091.34	1,092	1,107.92	1,109.92	1,109.92
UUP	Mary Hamilton*	10.83%	1,017	1,070.13	1,079.37	1,101.6	1,101.82	1,101.82
DUP	Mildred Garfield*	9.40%	883	1,061.94	1,066.56	1,086.25	1,087.25	1,087.25
Sinn Féin	Jim Logue	4.76%	447	447.23	457.35	472.13		
Socialist Environmental	David McAuley	2.74%	194	196.07	204.65			
Electorate: 14,884 Valid: 9,394 (63.11%) Spoilt: 208 Quota: 1,175 Turnout: 9,602 (64.51%)
