= 2011 Derry City Council election =

Local govt election in Northern Ireland

← 2005	5 May 2011	2014 →

All 30 seats to Derry City Council 16 seats needed for a majority
	First party	Second party	Third party
Party	SDLP	Sinn Féin	DUP
Seats won	14	10	5
Seat change	0	0	0
	Fourth party
Party	UUP
Seats won	1
Seat change	0
- Party with the most votes by district.

Elections to Derry City Council were held on 5 May 2011 on the same day as the other Northern Irish local government elections. The election used five district electoral areas to elect a total of 30 councillors.

There was no change from the prior election.

== Election results ==
Derry City Council Election Result 2011
Party	Seats	Gains	Losses	Net gain/loss	Seats %	Votes %	Votes	+/−
SDLP	14	0	0	0	46.7	38.2	15,805	▼2.8
Sinn Féin	10	0	0	0	33.3	33.9	14,011	▲1.1
DUP	5	0	0	0	16.7	14.7	6,081	▼1.4
UUP	1	0	0	0	3.3	4.0	1,642	▼0.4
People Before Profit	0	0	0	0	0.0	3.2	1,307	New
Independent	0	0	0	0	0.0	2.6	1,089	▼0.1
Irish Republican Socialist	0	0	0	0	0.0	2.1	879	▲2.1
Alliance	0	0	0	0	0.0	0.9	359	▲0.9
PUP	0	0	0	0	0.0	0.5	204	▲0.5

Note: "Votes" are the first preference votes.

== Districts summary ==
Results of the Derry City Council election, 2011 by district
Ward	%	Cllrs	%	Cllrs	%	Cllrs	%	Cllrs	%	Cllrs	Total Cllrs
Ward	SDLP		Sinn Féin		DUP		UUP		Others		Total Cllrs
Cityside	30.5	2	54.4	3	0.0	0	0.0	0	15.1	0	5
Northland	48.1	4	39.8	3	0.0	0	0.0	0	12.1	0	7
Rural	35.6	3	25.2	1	28.8	2	7.6	0	2.8	0	6
Shantallow	51.4	3	37.3	2	0.0	0	0.0	0	11.3	0	5
Waterside	20.7	2	18.4	1	42.3	3	11.6	1	7.0	0	7
Total	38.2	14	33.9	10	14.7	5	4.0	1	9.2	0	30

== District results ==
=== Cityside ===
2005: 3 x Sinn Féin, 2 x SDLP
2011: 3 x Sinn Féin, 2 x SDLP
2005-2011 Change: No change

Cityside - 5 seats
Party	Candidate	FPv%	Count					
Party	Candidate	FPv%	1	2	3	4	5	6
SDLP	Jim Clifford*	21.42%	1,243					
Sinn Féin	Kevin Campbell*	20.66%	1,199					
Sinn Féin	Patricia Logue*	16.15%	937	947.32	963.32	975.32		
Sinn Féin	Colin Kelly	10.87%	631	637	659.6	667.36	694.64	1,005.64
SDLP	Ann Donnelly	5.36%	311	485	494.4	680.2	742.6	785.96
Independent	Gary Donnelly	10.55%	612	628.08	636.28	643.96	674.88	689.36
Sinn Féin	Liam Friel	6.74%	391	405.16	567.96	576.68	631.68	
People Before Profit	Connor Kelly	4.57%	265	269.32	272.92	280		
SDLP	Dermot Henderson	3.69%	214	263.2	268			
Electorate: 9,023 Valid: 5,803 (64.31%) Spoilt: 213 Quota: 968 Turnout: 6,016 (66.67%)

=== Northland ===
2005: 4 x SDLP, 3 x Sinn Féin
2011: 4 x SDLP, 3 x Sinn Féin
2005-2011 Change: No change

Northland - 7 seats
Party	Candidate	FPv%	Count							
Party	Candidate	FPv%	1	2	3	4	5	6	7	8
SDLP	John Tierney	18.75%	1,736							
Sinn Féin	Maeve McLaughlin*	13.61%	1,260							
SDLP	John Boyle	11.87%	1,099	1,264.2						
SDLP	Sean Carr*	8.90%	824	923.05	1,004.7	1,047.85	1,088.29	1,199.29		
Sinn Féin	Gerry MacLochlainn*	10.11%	936	952.45	952.91	964.26	993.31	1,004.99	1,024.27	1,100.27
SDLP	Eamon McAuley	4.63%	429	590.35	599.55	631.25	654.6	878.31	880.87	997.87
Sinn Féin	Michael Cooper	8.46%	783	795.6	796.75	800.1	841.45	855.43	892.07	958.07
Sinn Féin	Eric McGinley	7.60%	704	721.85	722.08	726.54	744.54	757.39	788.51	824.51
People Before Profit	Colm Bryce	6.09%	564	576.25	577.4	615.55	668.25	690.56	693.2	
SDLP	Fiona Hamilton	3.95%	366	427.95	437.15	475.25	501.23			
Irish Republican Socialist	Lucy Callaghan	3.67%	340	348.4	349.32	353.32				
Alliance	Colm Cavanagh	2.34%	217	229.25	229.71					
Electorate: 16,367 Valid: 9,258 (56.57%) Spoilt: 330 Quota: 1,158 Turnout: 9,588 (58.58%)

=== Rural ===
2005: 3 x SDLP, 2 x DUP, 1 x Sinn Féin
2011: 3 x SDLP, 2 x DUP, 1 x Sinn Féin
2005-2011 Change: No change

Rural - 6 seats
Party	Candidate	FPv%	Count								
Party	Candidate	FPv%	1	2	3	4	5	6	7	8	9
Sinn Féin	Paul Fleming*	18.39%	1,693								
SDLP	Thomas Conway*	17.55%	1,616								
DUP	Maurice Devenney*	15.56%	1,433								
DUP	Gary Middleton	13.24%	1,219	1,221.07	1,224.3	1,224.3	1,227.3	1,732.3			
SDLP	Brenda Stevenson	6.68%	615	628.34	685.34	709.76	1,110.67	1,179.23	1,285.23	1,352.19	
SDLP	Gus Hastings	6.78%	624	652.98	771.16	827.44	889.84	920.22	975.22	1,022.03	1,049.31
Sinn Féin	Catherine Nelis	6.85%	631	938.51	972.33	1,009.51	1,039.17	1,040.36	1,042.36	1,045.15	1,047.01
UUP	Ronald McKeegan	7.58%	698	698.46	702.83	725.83	730.83				
SDLP	Ashleen Schenning	4.59%	423	432.43	498.93	544.29					
People Before Profit	Diane Greer	2.78%	256	262.44	267.76						
Electorate: 16,892 Valid: 9,208 (54.51%) Spoilt: 202 Quota: 1,316 Turnout: 9,410 (55.71%)

=== Shantallow ===
2005: 3 x SDLP, 2 x Sinn Féin
2011: 3 x SDLP, 2 x Sinn Féin
2005-2011 Change: No change

Shantallow - 5 seats
Party	Candidate	FPv%	Count					
Party	Candidate	FPv%	1	2	3	4	5	6
SDLP	Colum Eastwood*	23.43%	2,109					
Sinn Féin	Tony Hassan*	15.61%	1,405	1,443.1	1,493.3	1,584.3		
SDLP	Shaun Gallagher*	12.79%	1,151	1,397	1,484.1	1,552.1		
SDLP	Jimmy Carr	8.51%	766	844.6	885.3	952.2	955.2	1,398.2
Sinn Féin	Elisha McLaughlin*	12.41%	1,117	1,140.1	1,179.7	1,253.6	1,288.6	1,307.6
Sinn Féin	Sandra Duffy	9.26%	833	848.3	871.3	893.3	911.3	943.3
SDLP	Angela Dobbins	6.70%	603	775.8	826.8	848.3	849.3	
Irish Republican Socialist	Martin McMonagle	5.99%	539	544.4	609.7			
Independent	Pauline Mellon	5.30%	477	493.5				
Electorate: 15,935 Valid: 9,000 (56.48%) Spoilt: 201 Quota: 1,501 Turnout: 9,201 (57.74%)

=== Waterside ===
2005: 3 x DUP, 2 x SDLP, 1 x Sinn Féin, 1 x UUP
2011: 3 x DUP, 2 x SDLP, 1 x Sinn Féin, 1 x UUP
2005-2011 Change: No change

Waterside - 7 seats
Party	Candidate	FPv%	Count									
Party	Candidate	FPv%	1	2	3	4	5	6	7	8	9	10
DUP	Joe Miller*	19.29%	1,564									
SDLP	Gerard Diver*	14.78%	1,198									
Sinn Féin	Lynn Fleming*	14.02%	1,137									
DUP	April Garfield-Kidd	12.41%	1,006	1,312.6								
DUP	Drew Thompson*	10.59%	859	1,010.9	1,277.12							
UUP	Mary Hamilton*	11.64%	944	997.55	1,012.51	1,110.09						
SDLP	Martin Reilly*	5.90%	478	483.95	485.31	492.45	645.73	656.77	663.57	729.21	823.28	858.28
Sinn Féin	Geraldine O'Donnell	4.37%	354	355.05	355.05	355.05	366.57	473.73	473.73	478.17	503.03	507.03
PUP	Nigel Gardiner	2.52%	204	216.25	226.11	253.31	254.91	254.91	296.39	304.28	325.47	
People Before Profit	David McAuley	2.74%	222	223.75	224.77	226.47	230.63	232.91	234.27	253.57		
Alliance	Karen Scrivens	1.75%	142	144.45	144.79	148.19	154.11	155.31	161.77			
Electorate: 15,252 Valid: 8,108 (53.16%) Spoilt: 251 Quota: 1,014 Turnout: 8,359 (54.81%)
