= Northland (District Electoral Area) =

District electoral areas in Derry, Northern Ireland

Northland DEA (1993-2014) within Derry

Northland was one of the five district electoral areas in Derry, Northern Ireland which existed from 1985 to 2014. The district elected six members to Derry City Council until 1993, and seven members until 2014, and formed part of the Foyle constituencies for the Northern Ireland Assembly and UK Parliament.

It was created for the 1985 local elections, replacing Londonderry Area D which had existed since 1973, and contained the wards of Crevagh and Springtown, Glen, Pennyburn, Rosemount, Strand and The Diamond. For the 1993 local elections it gained an additional ward, Foyle Springs. It was abolished for the 2014 local elections and replaced with the Foyleside DEA.

== Councillors ==
Election	Councillor (Party)	Councillor (Party)	Councillor (Party)	Councillor (Party)	Councillor (Party)	Councillor (Party)	Councillor (Party)
2011	John Tierney (SDLP)	John Boyle (SDLP)	Séan Carr (SDLP)	Eamon McAuley (SDLP)	Michael Cooper (Sinn Féin)	Maeve McLaughlin (Sinn Féin)	Gerry MacLochlainn (Sinn Féin)
2005	Helen Quigley (SDLP)	Mark H. Durkan (SDLP)	Séan Carr (SDLP)	Seana Hume (SDLP)	William Page (Sinn Féin)	Maeve McLaughlin (Sinn Féin)	Gerry MacLochlainn (Sinn Féin)
2001	Helen Quigley (SDLP)	John Kerr (SDLP)	Séan Carr (SDLP)	Kathleen McCloskey (SDLP)	William Page (Sinn Féin)	Maeve McLaughlin (Sinn Féin)	Mary Nelis (Sinn Féin)
1997	John Tierney (SDLP)	John Kerr (SDLP)	Mark Durkan (SDLP)	Kathleen McCloskey (SDLP)	Martin Bradley (SDLP)	Marion Hutcheon (Sinn Féin)	Mary Nelis (Sinn Féin)
1993	John Tierney (SDLP)	John Kerr (SDLP)	Mark Durkan (SDLP)	Kathleen McCloskey (SDLP)	Martin Bradley (SDLP)	Mitchel McLaughlin (Sinn Féin)	Mary Nelis (Sinn Féin)
1989	John Tierney (SDLP)	John Kerr (SDLP)	Anna Gallagher (SDLP)	William McCorriston (SDLP)	David Davis (Independent Unionist)/ (UUP)	Bernard McFadden (Sinn Féin)	6 seats 1985–1993
1985	John Tierney (SDLP)	Leonard Green (SDLP)	Anna Gallagher (SDLP)	Fergus McAteer (IIP)	David Davis (Independent Unionist)/ (UUP)	Bernard McFadden (Sinn Féin)	6 seats 1985–1993

== 2011 Election ==
2005: 4 x SDLP, 3 x Sinn Féin

2011: 4 x SDLP, 3 x Sinn Féin

2005-2011 Change: No change

Northland - 7 seats
Party	Candidate	FPv%	Count							
Party	Candidate	FPv%	1	2	3	4	5	6	7	8
SDLP	John Tierney	18.75%	1,736							
Sinn Féin	Maeve McLaughlin*	13.61%	1,260							
SDLP	John Boyle	11.87%	1,099	1,264.2						
SDLP	Sean Carr*	8.90%	824	923.05	1,004.7	1,047.85	1,088.29	1,199.29		
Sinn Féin	Gerry MacLochlainn*	10.11%	936	952.45	952.91	964.26	993.31	1,004.99	1,024.27	1,100.27
SDLP	Eamon McAuley	4.63%	429	590.35	599.55	631.25	654.6	878.31	880.87	997.87
Sinn Féin	Michael Cooper	8.46%	783	795.6	796.75	800.1	841.45	855.43	892.07	958.07
Sinn Féin	Eric McGinley	7.60%	704	721.85	722.08	726.54	744.54	757.39	788.51	824.51
People Before Profit	Colm Bryce	6.09%	564	576.25	577.4	615.55	668.25	690.56	693.2	
SDLP	Fiona Hamilton	3.95%	366	427.95	437.15	475.25	501.23			
Irish Republican Socialist	Lucy Callaghan	3.67%	340	348.4	349.32	353.32				
Alliance	Colm Cavanagh	2.34%	217	229.25	229.71					
Electorate: 16,367 Valid: 9,258 (56.57%) Spoilt: 330 Quota: 1,158 Turnout: 9,588 (58.58%)

== 2005 Election ==
2001: 4 x SDLP, 3 x Sinn Féin

2005: 4 x SDLP, 3 x Sinn Féin

2001-2005 Change: No change

Northland - 7 seats
Party	Candidate	FPv%	Count								
Party	Candidate	FPv%	1	2	3	4	5	6	7	8	9
SDLP	Mark H. Durkan	23.25%	2,369								
SDLP	Seana Hume	7.73%	788	1,405.76							
Sinn Féin	Gerry MacLochlainn	11.03%	1,124	1,160.96	1,173.92	1,178.12	1,388.12				
Sinn Féin	William Page*	9.82%	1,001	1,031.24	1,038.24	1,039.84	1,078.94	1,114.42	1,593.42		
Sinn Féin	Maeve McLaughlin*	8.33%	849	873	883.96	885.96	1,053.92	1,114.32	1,303.32		
SDLP	Helen Quigley*	10.59%	1,079	1,168.28	1,183.24	1,198.94	1,202.94	1,273.16	1,282.16		
SDLP	Sean Carr*	6.25%	637	797.32	807.28	840.28	852.54	937.32	945.74	969.74	986.74
SDLP	John Kerr*	6.41%	653	745.16	756.52	816.62	824.02	866.44	874.56	892.56	904.56
Sinn Féin	Joanne McDaid	6.18%	630	638.64	643.64	645.24	679.78	735.78			
Socialist Environmental	Colm Bryce	3.46%	353	367.4	508.8	510.5	517.98				
Sinn Féin	Sharon Duddy	4.77%	486	493.68	497.16	498.16					
Socialist Environmental	Oisin Kehoe	2.34%	221	232.04							
Electorate: 15,278 Valid: 10,190 (66.70%) Spoilt: 280 Quota: 1,274 Turnout: 10,470 (68.53%)

== 2001 Election ==
1997: 5 x SDLP, 2 x Sinn Féin

2001: 4 x SDLP, 3 x Sinn Féin

1997-2001 Change: Sinn Féin gain from SDLP

Northland - 7 seats
Party	Candidate	FPv%	Count				
Party	Candidate	FPv%	1	2	3	4	5
SDLP	Kathleen McCloskey*	13.88%	1,528				
SDLP	John Kerr*	11.34%	1,248	1,276.9	1,384.9		
Sinn Féin	Mary Nelis*	8.90%	980	988.6	1,034.6	1,698.6	
Sinn Féin	Maeve McLaughlin	11.27%	1,240	1,247.1	1,291.1	1,430.1	
Sinn Féin	William Page	10.27%	1,130	1,132	1,148	1,200	1,506.74
SDLP	Helen Quigley	9.88%	1,087	1,125.5	1,267.5	1,278.5	1,283.89
SDLP	Sean Carr	10.51%	1,157	1,176.1	1,254.1	1,265.1	1,267.06
SDLP	James McClintock	8.38%	922	959.4	1,041.4	1,050.4	1,053.34
Sinn Féin	Gerry MacLochlainn	8.52%	938	940	976		
Independent	William Temple	3.70%	407	407.4			
Independent	Colm Bryce	2.49%	274	275.1			
Independent	Daniel Bradley	0.74%	82	83.3			
Independent	Catherine Harper	0.13%	14	14.4			
Electorate: 16,402 Valid: 11,007 (67.11%) Spoilt: 323 Quota: 1,376 Turnout: 11,330 (69.08%)

== 1997 Election ==
1993: 5 x SDLP, 2 x Sinn Féin

1997: 5 x SDLP, 2 x Sinn Féin

1993-1997 Change: No change

Northland - 7 seats
Party	Candidate	FPv%	Count						
Party	Candidate	FPv%	1	2	3	4	5	6	7
SDLP	Mark Durkan*	17.17%	1,679						
Sinn Féin	Mary Nelis*	16.00%	1,564						
SDLP	Martin Bradley*	11.41%	1,115	1,272.14					
Sinn Féin	Marion Hutcheon	11.54%	1,128	1,134.75	1,318.67				
SDLP	John Tierney*	11.21%	1,096	1,147.03	1,161.99	1,163.42	1,172.06	1,246.06	
SDLP	John Kerr*	8.69%	850	1,012	1,018.82	1,019.59	1,045.75	1,132.75	1,252.1
SDLP	Kathleen McCloskey*	8.74%	854	896.39	901.67	902.44	910.04	968.04	1,040.04
Sinn Féin	Pius McNaught	5.85%	572	577.94	691.24	779.35	780.23	822.23	827.23
Ind. Unionist	Alexander Simpson	5.44%	532	533.89	533.89	533.89	533.89	567.89	
NI Women's Coalition	Patricia McAdams	2.97%	290	303.23	308.51	309.06	310.5		
Labour Coalition	Anthony Martin	0.51%	50	52.97	54.51	54.62	54.94		
Labour Coalition	Geraldine O'Neill	0.47%	46	48.7	50.24	50.46	50.7		
Electorate: 16,075 Valid: 9,776 (60.81%) Spoilt: 207 Quota: 1,223 Turnout: 9,983 (62.10%)

== 1993 Election ==
1989: 4 x SDLP, 1 x Sinn Féin, 1 x Independent Unionist

1993: 5 x SDLP, 2 x Sinn Féin

1989-1993 Change: SDLP and Sinn Féin gain from Independent Unionist and due to the addition of one seat

Northland - 7 seats
Party	Candidate	FPv%	Count											
Party	Candidate	FPv%	1	2	3	4	5	6	7	8	9	10	11	12
SDLP	John Tierney*	16.05%	1,506											
Sinn Féin	Mitchel McLaughlin*	14.70%	1,380											
SDLP	Mark Durkan	13.97%	1,311											
SDLP	Martin Bradley	12.38%	1,162	1,296.64										
SDLP	John Kerr*	7.57%	710	767.84	770.24	838.55	922.01	927.79	942.9	952.71	955.71	1,040.95	1,095.17	1,201.17
Sinn Féin	Mary Nelis	8.08%	758	772.16	949.91	951.34	952.64	961.75	962.75	970.44	970.44	982.7	1,000.7	1,040.7
SDLP	Kathleen McCloskey	6.60%	619	704.92	707.17	744.57	771.09	774.48	786.48	797.22	800.22	849.24	918.24	996.24
Ind. Unionist	David Davis*	5.50%	516	520.08	521.88	526.5	528.06	530.06	554.5	561.98	745.44	759.77	778.77	844.77
Independent	Tony Carlin	3.68%	345	354.36	358.86	366.56	369.68	373.09	382.79	389.29	393.4	450.36	525.36	
Independent Labour	Patrick Muldowney	1.99%	187	191.32	194.47	197.33	198.11	214.33	221.44	356.78	359.78	374.22		
Ind. Nationalist	William McCorriston*	3.10%	291	303.24	304.44	309.72	313.36	319.6	320.93	321.93	323.93			
UUP	Gladys Carey	2.46%	231	231.24	231.24	231.46	231.46	231.46	238.46	239.57				
Independent Labour	Richard Foster	1.86%	175	180.52	181.72	183.15	184.19	194.29	212.29					
Alliance	Nigel Cooke	1.24%	116	116.72	116.72	118.48	118.48	118.72						
Workers' Party	Gordon McKenzie	0.45%	42	42.96	43.26	43.81	44.33							
Workers' Party	Noel Lynch	0.38%	36	36.72	37.47	38.24	38.24							
Electorate: 15,645 Valid: 9,385 (59.99%) Spoilt: 240 Quota: 1,174 Turnout: 9,625 (61.52%)

== 1989 Election ==
1985: 3 x SDLP, 1 x Sinn Féin, 1 x UUP, 1 x IIP

1989: 4 x SDLP, 1 x Sinn Féin, 1 x Independent Unionist

1985-1989 Change: SDLP gain from IIP, Independent Unionist leaves UUP

Northland - 6 seats
Party	Candidate	FPv%	Count					
Party	Candidate	FPv%	1	2	3	4	5	6
SDLP	John Tierney*	18.31%	1,565					
SDLP	Anna Gallagher*	15.08%	1,289					
SDLP	William McCorriston	13.20%	1,128	1,228.28				
Sinn Féin	Bernard McFadden*	13.84%	1,183	1,197.26	1,561.26			
SDLP	John Kerr	11.43%	977	1,054.51	1,065.81	1,113.81	1,127.81	1,133.81
Ind. Unionist	David Davis*	7.10%	607	622.18	629.1	651.1	654.2	1,128.48
SDLP	Leonard Green*	9.10%	778	889.78	898.7	917.7	960.05	972.05
UUP	Jack Allen	6.90%	590	591.15	593.15	593.15	593.25	
Sinn Féin	Martin Nelis	5.01%	428	437.89				
Electorate: 14,337 Valid: 8,545 (59.60%) Spoilt: 284 Quota: 1,221 Turnout: 8,829 (61.58%)

== 1985 Election ==
1985: 3 x SDLP, 1 x Sinn Féin, 1 x UUP, 1 x IIP

Northland - 6 seats
Party	Candidate	FPv%	Count									
Party	Candidate	FPv%	1	2	3	4	5	6	7	8	9	10
SDLP	John Tierney*	18.32%	1,417									
Sinn Féin	Bernard McFadden	13.78%	1,066	1,074.14	1,079.14	1,190.14						
UUP	David Davis*	11.30%	874	874	874	875	928	1,329				
SDLP	Leonard Green*	10.34%	800	885.36	893.24	900.56	940	942	952	957	1,220	
SDLP	Anna Gallagher*	9.13%	706	752.42	760.86	772.3	819.96	820.96	831.96	834.96	1,024.16	1,100.16
Irish Independence	Fergus McAteer*	8.81%	681	699.92	731.8	811.12	821.12	822.12	827.12	875.12	947.66	949.16
SDLP	William McCorriston*	7.69%	595	681.68	686.68	691.22	716.88	716.88	723.88	727.88	886.56	922.56
SDLP	John Kerr	8.26%	639	682.12	684.78	688.22	714.1	714.1	723.1	723.1		
DUP	John Noble	5.39%	417	417	417	419	425					
Alliance	Mary Breen	3.15%	244	247.52	248.52	251.52						
Sinn Féin	James McKnight	1.69%	131	135.62	135.62							
Irish Independence	Annie Burke	1.27%	98	100.64	106.64							
Irish Independence	John McCool	0.85%	66	69.08								
Electorate: 12,243 Valid: 7,734 (63.17%) Spoilt: 191 Quota: 1,105 Turnout: 7,925 (64.73%)
