= John Tierney (Irish politician) =

Northern Irish politician (born 1951)

Mayor of Derry
- In office 1984–1985
- Preceded by: Len Green
- Succeeded by: John McNickle

Member of Derry City Council
- In office 26 September 2007 – 25 September 2013
- Succeeded by: Shauna Cusack
- Constituency: Northland
- In office 15 May 1985 – 7 June 2001
- Preceded by: District created
- Succeeded by: Helen Quigley
- Constituency: Northland
- In office 20 May 1981 – 15 May 1985
- Preceded by: Raymond McClean
- Succeeded by: District abolished
- Constituency: Londonderry Area D

Chief whip of the SDLP in the Northern Ireland Assembly
- In office 2002 – 26 November 2003
- Leader: Mark Durkan

Member of the Legislative Assembly for Foyle
- In office 25 June 1998 – 26 November 2003
- Preceded by: Constituency created
- Succeeded by: Pat Ramsey

Member of the Northern Ireland Forum for Foyle
- In office 30 May 1996 – 25 April 1998

Personal details
- Born: 9 December 1951 (age 74) Derry, Northern Ireland
- Party: Social Democratic and Labour Party

John Tierney (born 9 December 1951) is an Irish Social Democratic and Labour Party (SDLP) politician who served as a Member of the Legislative Assembly (MLA) for Foyle from 1998 to 2003.

== Early life and career ==
Born in Derry, Tierney worked as a tool setter before joining the Social Democratic and Labour Party (SDLP). He was elected to Derry City Council in 1981, and served as the Mayor of Derry in 1984. In 1996, Tierney was elected to the Northern Ireland Forum for Foyle, and he held his seat at the 1998 Northern Ireland Assembly election. He stood down from the Council in 2001, while the following year, he became the whip of the SDLP group on the Assembly.

Tierney stood down from the Assembly at the 2003 election, and in 2007 was co-opted back on to Derry City Council.

Civic offices
Preceded by Leonard Green	Mayor of Derry; 1984–1985	Succeeded by John McNickle
Northern Ireland Forum
New forum	Member for Foyle; 1996–1998	Forum dissolved
Northern Ireland Assembly
New assembly	MLA for Foyle; 1998–2003	Succeeded by Pat Ramsey
