= Derry City Council, Re Application for Judicial Review =

Judicial review on name of Derry/Londonderry

- Court: High Court of Northern Ireland
- Full case name: Derry City Council, Re Application for Judicial Review [2007] NIQB 5
- Citation: [2007] NIQB 5

Case opinions
- Decision by: Mr Justice Weatherup

Derry City Council, Re Application for Judicial Review [2007] NIQB 5 is a 2007 High Court of Northern Ireland application for judicial review. It was brought by the Derry City Council requesting that the British government change the official name of the Northern Irish city of Londonderry to Derry in keeping with the council's policy. The request was declined after the judge ruled that as the city was named Londonderry via a royal charter, any change could only be made by the monarch under the royal prerogative or by British legislation.

== Background ==
The historic city of Derry in the Kingdom of Ireland was destroyed in 1608. It was rebuilt by members of The Honourable The Irish Society and the livery companies of the City of London. The rebuilt city was granted a royal charter by King James I giving it the name of Londonderry in recognition of the City of London's part in the rebuilding. A further royal charter was issued in 1662 by King Charles II affirming the change of name as it stated; "We will, ordain, constitute, confirm, and declare that the said city or town of Derry, for ever hereafter be, and shall be named and called the City of Londonderry."

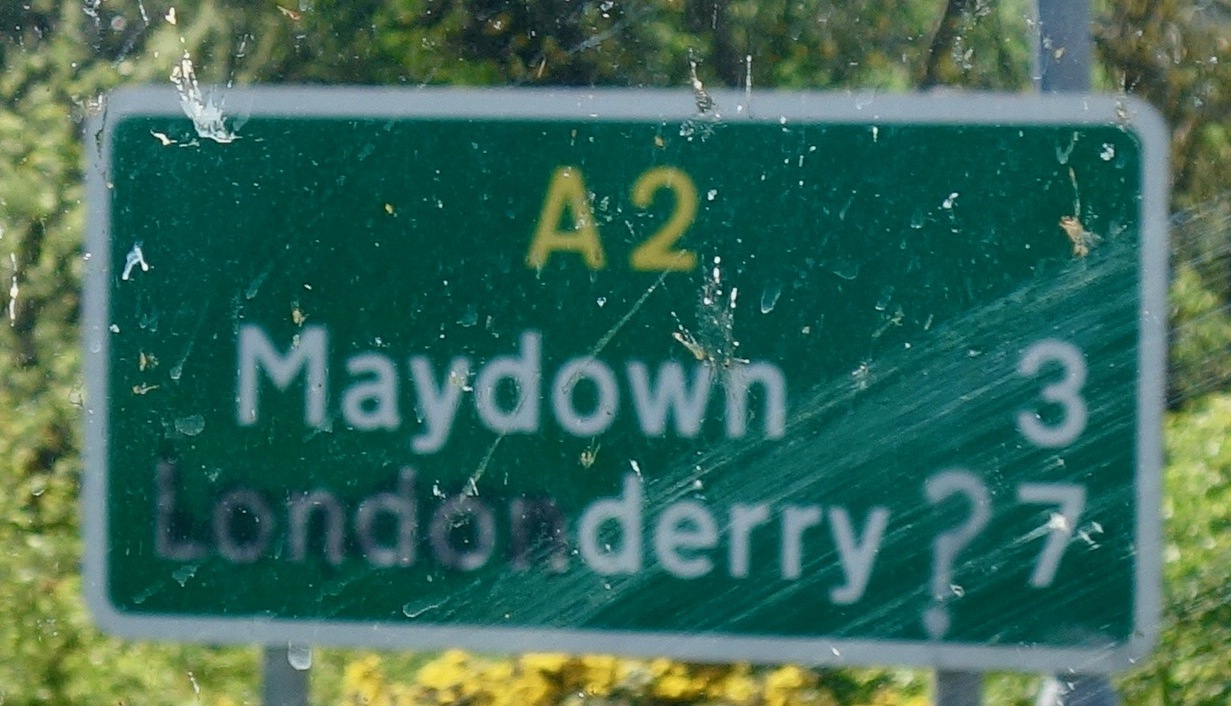
The name of the city has been contentious, pictured a vandalised road sign covering up part of Londonderry

The city eventually grew to become the second largest city in Northern Ireland after Belfast. In 1984, the nationalist Social Democratic and Labour Party (SDLP) had gained control of the city council and changed the name of the council from Londonderry City Council to Derry City Council over opposition from unionist members. It was stated then that they needed to petition Queen Elizabeth II for the change to be official for the city name due to the charter. The nationalist-led council replied that they had no intention of "petitioning an English Queen to change the name of our Irish city". As such, the city's name officially remained as Londonderry. In 2005, the city's solicitor wrote to the Department of the Environment requesting official recognition of Derry being the name of the city, which was denied by the department. As a result, in 2006, the council applied for a judicial review in order to determine if it was legally possible to change the official name of the city, which was granted after the British government continued to call the city Londonderry.

== Case ==
The case was heard at the High Court of Northern Ireland by Justice Weatherup. The council's argument was that they had legally changed the name of the city under the Local Government Act (Northern Ireland) 1972 and by the Change of District Name (Londonderry) Order (Northern Ireland) 1984 made by the Department of the Environment. The government responded that the council lacked the legal authority to alter the charter as under the Government of Ireland Act 1920, which partitioned Ireland into Northern Ireland and Southern Ireland, it stated that the newly created Parliament of Northern Ireland had no authority over matters concerning The Crown, royal prerogative or any titles of honour granted by The Crown as these were "excepted matters". Justice Weatherup rejected the three arguments made that the council lacked the authority to attempt the change citing that the 1972 act made a clear separation of the authority of the Crown and the royal prerogative and that the name of the city was not a title of honour.

The government then argued that as Derry City Council was the legal successor to the Londonderry Corporation which ran the city prior to 1972, then the council were obliged to maintain the original name. The court also rejected this assertion stating that there was no legal obligation to continue the name of the Londonderry Corporation. Justice Weatherup then considered if the council had officially changed the name of the city. He viewed that there was a separation between the city and the district and that the council could apply to substitute the name of the district under the 1972 act which was done in 1984; though it was noted that the city did not attempt to alter the name of County Londonderry. He found that the council had legally changed the name of the district but this had no effect on the legal name of the city.

In summing up, Justice Weatherup affirmed the authority to change the name of the district was present in the 1972 act but it did not extend to changing the names of cities nor did he agree that any proposed change was "necessary or expedient". He stated that if the council wished to change the city name, then they needed to petition Privy Council of the United Kingdom and that it was the council's responsibility to pursue that option if they wished. As a result, the judgement of the court was to deny the application of the council confirming that due to the wording of the 1662 royal charter, the name of the city could only be changed by the monarch using the royal prerogative or via legislation from the Parliament of the United Kingdom.

== Aftermath ==
Following the ruling, Sinn Féin councillors stated they would continue to fight for the name change. Democratic Unionist Party (DUP) councillor Gregory Campbell said that the court ruling "should put the issue to rest". Sinn Féin members on the council often made motions to change the official name of the city from Londonderry to Derry over the following decade; all were defeated in council votes by DUP and SDLP votes. In 2015, a motion in favour of a rename was passed and an official request was made to the government. The request was denied in the House of Lords, with Lord Dunlop stating "At this time the Government does not intend to change the name of the City of Londonderry."
