= Jeffery Agate =

Provisional IRA murder victim

- Born: Jeffery Stanford Agate c. 1919; Calcutta, West Bengal, India
- Died: 2 February 1977 (age 58)
- Cause of death: Murder by shooting

Jeffery Stanford Agate OBE (1919–1977) was the managing director of the DuPont manufacturing plant at Maydown, County Londonderry, Northern Ireland. He was shot dead by members of the Provisional Irish Republican Army (IRA) outside his home at Talbot Park, Derry, as he returned from work on the evening of 2 February 1977.

== Early life ==
Agate was the only son of Carlton and Ethel Agate. He was born in Calcutta, West Bengal, India, where his father was employed as an engineer. He had two older sisters, Theodora and Cynthia.

Educated in England, Agate achieved a BSc in engineering. During the Second World War, he saw active duty on HMS Devonshire as a temporary lieutenant (E) in the Royal Navy. In 1957, he joined DuPont as chief engineer at the Maydown plant. He was promoted to plant manager in 1962 and later became managing director.

== Murder ==
Agate was shot dead by members of the Provisional Irish Republican Army (IRA) outside his home at Talbot Park, Derry, as he returned from work on the evening of 2 February 1977.

Agate had been well-liked and respected by DuPont workers regardless of their background, and by the Derry community generally. Consequently, Agate's killing prompted an enormous outpouring of public grief that culminated in a mass protest at Guildhall Square in Derry and united people from all communities at a time of heightened sectarian tension. The nationalist former mayor of Derry Raymond McClean, who had worked as a medical doctor at the DuPont plant, later described Agate as "an honest and just human being of the highest calibre", saying, "His assassination by the IRA left me in total disbelief and disgust."

Agate's widow, Alice Vera Agate (née Dand), returned to her native Newcastle upon Tyne, where she lived in relative isolation until her death in 1994. The Agates had no children.

Agate's murder was the first in a series of IRA attacks on businessmen. The IRA claimed, "Those involved in the management of the economy serve British interests. They represent and maintain economic interests which make the war necessary."

== Eulogy ==
Jeff Agate's funeral took place on 5 February 1977. The eulogy was given by Brian Faulkner, the Prime Minister of Northern Ireland, as follows:

We are met this morning to honour the memory of one of nature's gentlemen – true humility, personal charm, absolute integrity – all coupled with great humility. Those are the qualities for which most of us remember Jeff Agate. Some of us knew him best in industry, and whether from his colleagues in the CBI [Confederation of British Industry], or from trade union leaders in the Irish Congress of Trade Unions, or from his own workforce at Maydown, they gave him a loyalty which few men have the privilege to know and which came to him because all of these people, whether as groups or as individuals, trusted him absolutely.

And he never betrayed that trust. There was a most moving occasion the day before yesterday when, in pouring rain and a howling gale, virtually the whole workforce at Maydown came out and stood in silence for two minutes.

== Conviction ==
In 1979, Raymond McCartney was convicted of Agate's murder and sentenced to life imprisonment. The conviction was overturned in 2007.

== See also ==
- Chronology of Provisional Irish Republican Army actions (1970–1979)
- Murder of Patrick Kelly
