= Mark H. Durkan =

Northern Ireland politician (born 1978)

Mark H. Durkan MLA
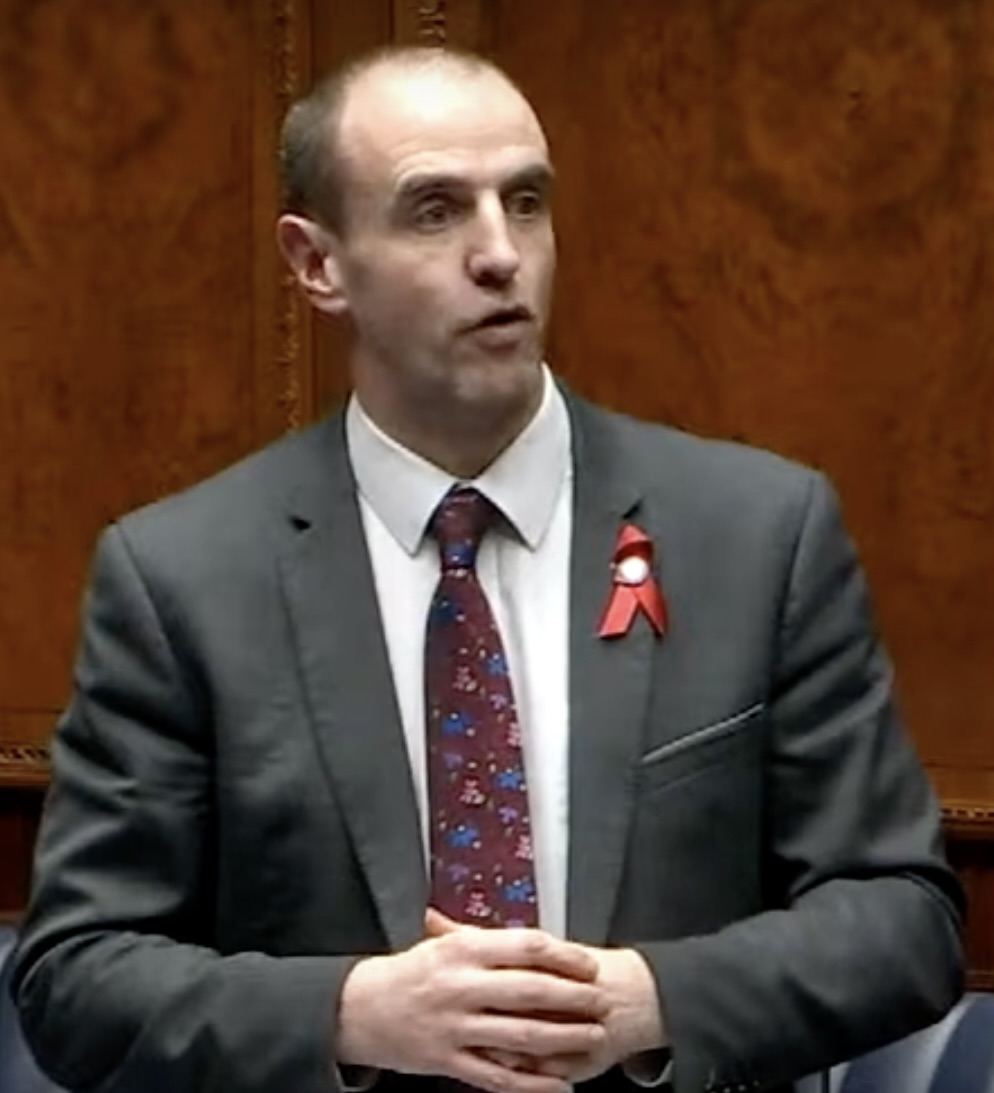

Minister of the Environment
- In office 16 July 2013 – 6 May 2016
- Preceded by: Alex Attwood
- Succeeded by: abolished

Member of the Legislative Assembly for Foyle
- Incumbent
- Assumed office 5 May 2011
- Preceded by: Mary Bradley

Member of Derry City Council
- In office 5 May 2005 – 5 May 2011
- Preceded by: John Kerr
- Succeeded by: John Boyle
- Constituency: Northland

Personal details
- Born: Mark Henry Durkan; 3 March 1978 (age 48) Derry, Northern Ireland
- Party: SDLP
- Spouse: Anne Carlin
- Children: 2
- Relatives: Mark Durkan (uncle)

Mark Henry Durkan (born 3 March 1978) is a Social Democratic and Labour Party (SDLP) politician in Northern Ireland who was elected to the Northern Ireland Assembly in 2011, representing the Foyle constituency. He served as Minister of the Environment until the department was dissolved in 2016. He is currently the SDLP spokesperson for Social Justice.

== Early life ==
Mark Durkan was born on 3 March 1978 to Patrick and Gay Durkan. He was one of six siblings. He studied in St Columb's College, Derry, before studying English at Queen's University, Belfast. After leaving university, he worked for Ulster Ceramics, and then as a shop assistant, until his election to Derry City Council in 2005.

== Work ==
Durkan was elected to Derry City Council in 2005 topping the poll with 2369 first preference votes. He served on council until May 2011 sitting on the Western Health & Social Care Board and Western Education and Library Board. After his election to the Assembly in May 2011 he served as his party's health spokesman from May 2011 to April 2012, and campaigned on the outbreak in January 2012 of pseudomonas at both Royal Jubilee Maternity Services (Belfast) and Altnagelvin Area Hospital (Derry), which claimed the lives of several infants.

He served on the Northern Ireland Assembly's Social Development Committee from May 2011 to July 2013, where he worked on issues including housing and the Welfare Reform Bill. As Environment Minister, Durkan proposed reforms to the Northern Ireland planning system aimed at improving its efficiency and fairness. He is also considering an outright ban on election posters.

== Personal life ==
In 2006, Durkan sustained life-threatening injuries following a fall at his parents' home.

In his spare time, he regularly gives his time to charitable causes, which led him to compete in Ballroom and Latin Dancing competitions in his hometown, and white-collar boxing bouts. He is a running enthusiast having completed several half marathons and the first ever Walled City Marathon in Derry on 2 June 2013.

Durkan married Anne Carlin on 13 July 2013, and has three sons and a daughter. The family live in Strathfoyle. He is a nephew of former SDLP leader Mark Durkan.

Northern Ireland Assembly
Preceded by Mary Bradley	MLA for Foyle; 2011–present	Incumbent
Political offices
Preceded by Alex Attwood	Minister of the Environment; 2013 – 2016	Office abolished
