= Helen Quigley =

Irish Social Democratic and Labour Party politician

Leader of the SDLP on Derry City Council
- In office 2005 – 3 November 2010
- Leader: Mark Durkan

Mayor of Derry
- In office 2006–2007
- Preceded by: Lynn Fleming
- Succeeded by: Drew Thompson

Member of Derry City Council
- In office 7 June 2001 – 5 May 2011
- Preceded by: John Tierney
- Succeeded by: John Tierney
- Constituency: Northland

Personal details
- Born: Derry, Northern Ireland
- Political party: Social Democratic and Labour Party
- Awards: Freedom of the City of London (2007)

Helen Quigley is a former Irish Social Democratic and Labour Party politician from Derry in Northern Ireland.

== Career ==
She had been a member (for the Northland District Electoral Area) of Derry City Council since 2001 and the Mayor of Derry in 2006–07. She was awarded the Freedom of the City of London on 6 February 2007.

Helen Quigley was an unsuccessful SDLP candidate for the Foyle constituency in the 2007 Northern Ireland Assembly elections finishing 104 votes behind the last member elected, but remained as SDLP leader on Derry City Council.

In November 2010, she confirmed that she would not contest elections in May 2011 and the SDLP announced that she was leaving public life. She resigned as SDLP leader on Derry City Council, but would remain a member of the party. She has been active in the Inner City Trust since then, where she is the Strategic Projects Advisor.

Civic offices
Preceded by Lynn Fleming	Mayor of Derry; 2006–2007	Succeeded by Drew Thompson
