= Mary Nelis =

Irish politician

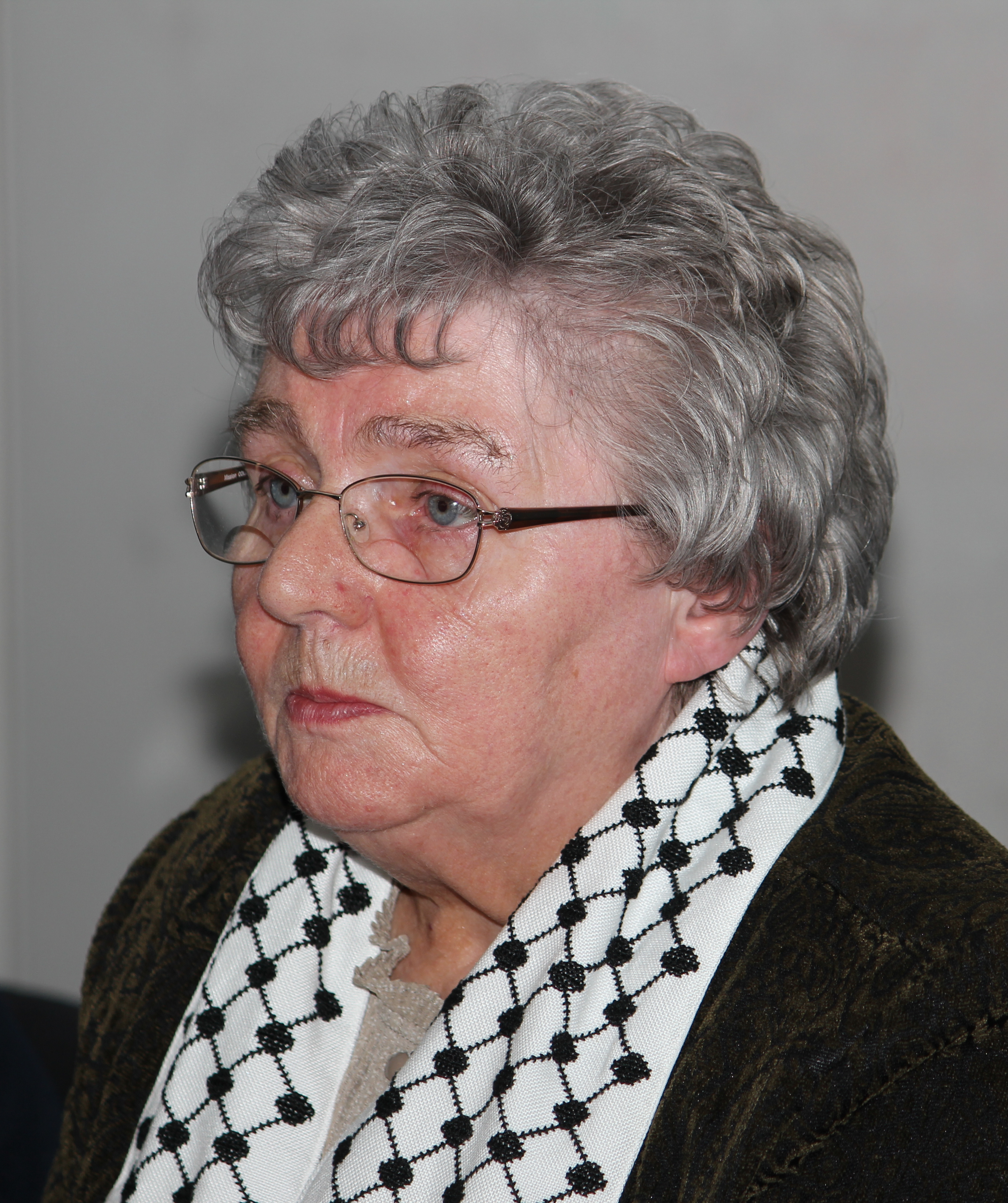
- Nelis in 2012

Member of the Northern Ireland Assembly for Foyle
- In office 25 June 1998 – 15 July 2004
- Preceded by: New Creation
- Succeeded by: Raymond McCartney

Member of Derry City Council
- In office 19 May 1993 – 5 May 2005
- Succeeded by: Gerry MacLochlainn
- Constituency: Northland

Personal details
- Born: 27 August 1935 (age 91) Bogside, Derry, Northern Ireland
- Party: Sinn Féin (since 1981)
- Other political affiliations: SDLP (1974-1975)
- Spouse: William Nelis
- Website: Mary Nelis

Mary Margaret Nelis, is an Irish former politician who was a Sinn Féin Member of the Northern Ireland Assembly (MLA) for Foyle from 1998 to 2004.

== Biography ==
She was born in Wellington Street in the Bogside area of Derry, Northern Ireland, in 1935. She is the eldest daughter of the late Catherine and Denis Elliott. She was educated at St Eugene's Convent School and left school at fourteen to work in the Hogg and Mitchell shirt factory. In 1955 she married William Nelis. They had nine children, eight sons and a daughter. Their eldest son was killed in a road traffic accident in 1974.

In the early 1960s, Mary Nelis organised the first community association in the Foyle Hill estate and helped spread community groups in other areas of the city, including the Protestant Fountain estate.

She became active in the civil rights campaign demanding equal rights for the people of the city. She trained as an adult literacy teacher and was a founding member of the Derry Reading Workshop, an organisation set up to help those with educational needs. In 1974, she joined the Social Democratic and Labour Party (SDLP), but resigned a year later. In 1976, she became active in the Relatives Action Committee: an organisation campaigning for prisoners' rights. Two of her sons were imprisoned in the H Blocks in HMP Maze. Her work with young people led to the setting up of Dove House, a resource centre in the Bogside. She later established the Templemore Co-op, a craft co-operative for women with exceptional sewing skills.

She was the centre of some controversy in 1978 when Conor Cruise O'Brien, editor-in-chief of The Observer, refused to publish an article about her by Mary Holland, describing Nelis as a "conwoman".

In 1981, Nelis joined Sinn Féin. She was elected to Derry City Council in 1993 and served two terms. In 1996 she was an unsuccessful candidate in the Northern Ireland Forum election in Foyle. She was elected to the Northern Ireland Assembly in 1998, one of only fourteen women of 108 members. She was re-elected in 2003, but resigned a year later to care for her husband, who sustained injuries in a road traffic accident; and was succeeded by Raymond McCartney. Nelis became Honorary President of Sinn Féin in Derry, the second person and only woman to receive the honour. She was presented with the Paul O Dwyer Award by the IAUC for her work for peace and justice in Ireland. She writes the political column in the Sunday Journal and also contributes to the Sinn Féin paper, An Phoblacht.

Northern Ireland Assembly
New assembly	MLA for Foyle; 1998–2004	Succeeded by Raymond McCartney
