= Pól Callaghan =

Politician from Northern Ireland

Member of the Legislative Assembly for Foyle
- In office 15 November 2010 – 5 May 2011
- Preceded by: Mark Durkan
- Succeeded by: Colum Eastwood

Personal details
- Born: Derry, Northern Ireland
- Party: SDLP

Pól Callaghan is an Irish former Social Democratic and Labour Party (SDLP) politician who was a Member of the Legislative Assembly (MLA) for Foyle between 2010 and 2011.

== Political career ==
On 15 November 2010, Callaghan was co-opted to the Northern Ireland Assembly for the Foyle constituency, succeeding Mark Durkan. Regarding his co-option, he said: "We know the people of Derry are hungry for change and as a new representative I can help build a newly energized SDLP to deliver it." Callaghan failed to retain his seat at the 2011 Assembly election.

Northern Ireland Assembly
Preceded by Mark Durkan	MLA for Foyle; 2010–2011	Succeeded by Colum Eastwood
