= Raymond McCartney =

Northern Irish politician (born 1954)

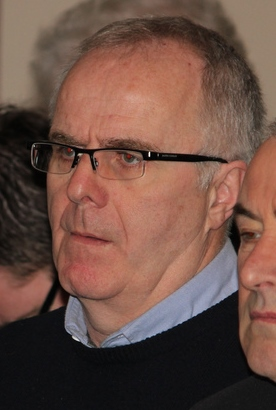

Member of the Northern Ireland Assembly for Foyle
- In office 15 July 2004 – 3 February 2020
- Preceded by: Mary Nelis
- Succeeded by: Martina Anderson

Personal details
- Born: 29 November 1954 (age 71) Derry, Northern Ireland
- Party: Sinn Féin
- Children: 1
- Website: Sinn Féin profile

Raymond McCartney (born 29 November 1954) is an Irish former Sinn Féin politician, and a former hunger striker and volunteer of the Provisional Irish Republican Army (IRA).

== IRA membership ==
McCartney took part in the civil rights march in Derry on 30 January 1972, an event widely known as Bloody Sunday. One of his cousins, James Wray, was one of 14 men shot and killed by the 1st Battalion, Parachute Regiment on that march. As a result of this incident McCartney joined the Provisional IRA several months later. In 1974 Martin McGuinness, who commanded the IRA in Derry, instructed McCartney to beat up an INLA man, Patsy O'Hara, who McGuinness called a "scumbag" and a "hood". On 12 January 1979 at Belfast Crown Court McCartney and another man, Eamonn MacDermott, were convicted of the murder of Detective Constable Patrick McNulty of the Royal Ulster Constabulary, who was shot several times outside a garage in Derry on 27 January 1977. McCartney was also convicted of IRA membership and the murder of businessman Jeffery Agate in February 1977, and was sentenced to life imprisonment. The murder convictions were overturned in 2007.

== Imprisonment ==
McCartney was involved in the blanket and dirty protests, then took part in the 1980 hunger strike, along with fellow IRA members Brendan Hughes, Tommy McKearney, Tom McFeely, Sean McKenna, Leo Green, and Irish National Liberation Army member John Nixon.

McCartney spent 53 days on hunger strike, from 27 October to 18 December. From 1989–91 he was Officer Commanding of the IRA prisoners in the H Blocks, and was released in 1994.

== Freedom and reversal of convictions ==
Since his release he has been active with ex-prisoners' groups Tar Abhaile and Coiste na n-Íarchimí, and was the first member of Sinn Féin to have their own voice heard on television after the lifting of the British broadcasting ban in 1994. McCartney was arrested on 4 April 2002 following a breach of security at Belfast's police headquarters, but released without charge the next day. Later that year, on 5 September, McCartney was the first former IRA member to appear before the Bloody Sunday Inquiry, and encouraged anyone with information, including paramilitaries, to come forward. He was an MLA for Foyle from 15 July 2004 until 3 February 2020.

On 15 February 2007 McCartney and MacDermott had their murder convictions quashed by the Court of Appeal, following an investigation by the Criminal Cases Review Commission in 2002. The Secretary of State for Northern Ireland declined to compensate McCartney and MacDermott on the grounds that they had not proven themselves innocent. The decision was appealed to the Supreme Court of the United Kingdom which, in May 2011, found in favour of the applicants, opening the way for a substantial compensation claim from both for their prison terms of 15 and 17 years.

Northern Ireland Assembly
Preceded by Mary Nelis	MLA for Foyle; 2004–2020	Succeeded by Martina Anderson
