= Annie Courtney =

Irish politician (died 2026)

Member of Derry City Council
- In office 15 May 1985 – 5 May 2005
- Preceded by: District created
- Succeeded by: Liam Boyle
- Constituency: Rural

Member of the Northern Ireland Assembly for Foyle
- In office 1 December 2000 – 26 November 2003
- Preceded by: John Hume
- Succeeded by: Mary Bradley

Personal details
- Born: Derry, Northern Ireland
- Died: 23 July 2026 Prehen, Northern Ireland
- Party: Independent (from 2003)
- Other political affiliations: SDLP (until 2003)

Annie Courtney (died 23 July 2026) was an Irish Social Democratic and Labour Party (SDLP) politician who was a Member of the Northern Ireland Assembly (MLA) for Foyle from 2000 to 2003.

== Life and career ==
Courtney became a nurse in Derry. She joined the Social Democratic and Labour Party (SDLP), was elected to Derry City Council in 1985, and served as Mayor of Derry in 1993. Courtney retired from nursing in 1997.

When SDLP leader John Hume resigned from the Northern Ireland Assembly, effective from December 2000, Courtney was co-opted as his replacement, representing Foyle. Courtney was keen to contest the 2003 Northern Ireland Assembly election for the party, but did not gain the SDLP's nomination. As a result, she resigned from the party in April 2003 and instead sat as an independent. Courtney stood as an independent in the election, but took only 802 votes and was not elected.

Courtney died at her home in Prehen on 23 July 2026.

Civic offices
Preceded by William Hay	Mayor of Derry; 1993–94	Succeeded by James Guy
Northern Ireland Assembly
Preceded by John Hume	MLA for Foyle; 2000–2003	Succeeded by Mary Bradley
