= Mark Durkan =

Irish politician

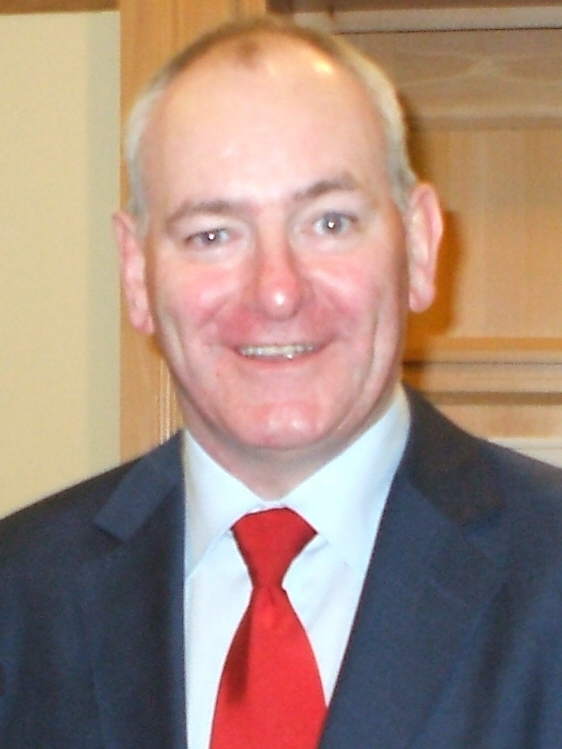
- Durkan in 2011

Deputy First Minister of Northern Ireland
- In office 6 November 2001 – 14 October 2002 Serving with David Trimble (Note: Reg Empey served as Acting First Minister from 1 July to 6 November 2001.)
- Preceded by: Seamus Mallon
- Succeeded by: John Reid (Note: During the periods of suspension of the Northern Ireland Executive, the Secretaries of State for Northern Ireland assumed the responsibilities of the First Minister and deputy First Minister. At the time of suspension the Northern Ireland Secretary was John Reid.) (As Secretary of State for Northern Ireland); Martin McGuinness (2007)

Leader of the Social Democratic and Labour Party
- In office 6 November 2001 – 7 February 2010
- Deputy: Bríd Rodgers; Alasdair McDonnell
- Preceded by: John Hume
- Succeeded by: Margaret Ritchie

Member of Parliament for Foyle
- In office 5 May 2005 – 3 May 2017
- Preceded by: John Hume
- Succeeded by: Elisha McCallion

Member of the Legislative Assembly for Foyle
- In office 25 June 1998 – 9 November 2010
- Preceded by: Constituency established
- Succeeded by: Pól Callaghan

Member of Derry City Council
- In office 19 May 1993 – 7 June 2001
- Preceded by: Anna Gallagher
- Succeeded by: Séan Carr
- Constituency: Northland

Personal details
- Born: John Mark Durkan; 26 June 1960 (age 66) Derry, Northern Ireland
- Party: Fine Gael; SDLP
- Spouse: Jackie Durkan
- Children: Dearbháil Durkan
- Parent(s): Brendan Durkan; Isobel Durkan
- Relatives: Mark H. Durkan
- Education: Queen's University Belfast; University of Ulster
- a. Reg Empey served as Acting First Minister from 1 July to 6 November 2001. b. During the periods of suspension of the Northern Ireland Executive, the Secretaries of State for Northern Ireland assumed the responsibilities of the First Minister and deputy First Minister. At the time of suspension the Northern Ireland Secretary was John Reid.

Mark Durkan (born 26 June 1960) is a retired Irish nationalist politician from Northern Ireland. Durkan was the Deputy First Minister of Northern Ireland from November 2001 to October 2002, and the Leader of the Social Democratic and Labour Party (SDLP) from 2001 to 2010. He contested the Dublin constituency for Fine Gael at the 2019 European Parliament election.

== Early life ==
John Mark Durkan was born in Derry, County Londonderry; his father, Brendan, was a Royal Ulster Constabulary District Inspector in Armagh. He was raised by his mother, Isobel, after his father was killed in a road accident in 1961. He was educated at St. Patrick's Primary School and at St. Columb's College, where he was Head Boy.

He studied politics at the Queen's University of Belfast (QUB), and later did a part-time postgraduate course in Public Policy Management with the University of Ulster at Magee. While at QUB Durkan served as Deputy President of Queen's Students' Union from 1982 to 1983. He was also elected Deputy President of Aontas na Mac Léinn in Éirinn (AMLÉ), formerly the Union of Students in Ireland (USI) from 1982 to 1984.

== Political career ==
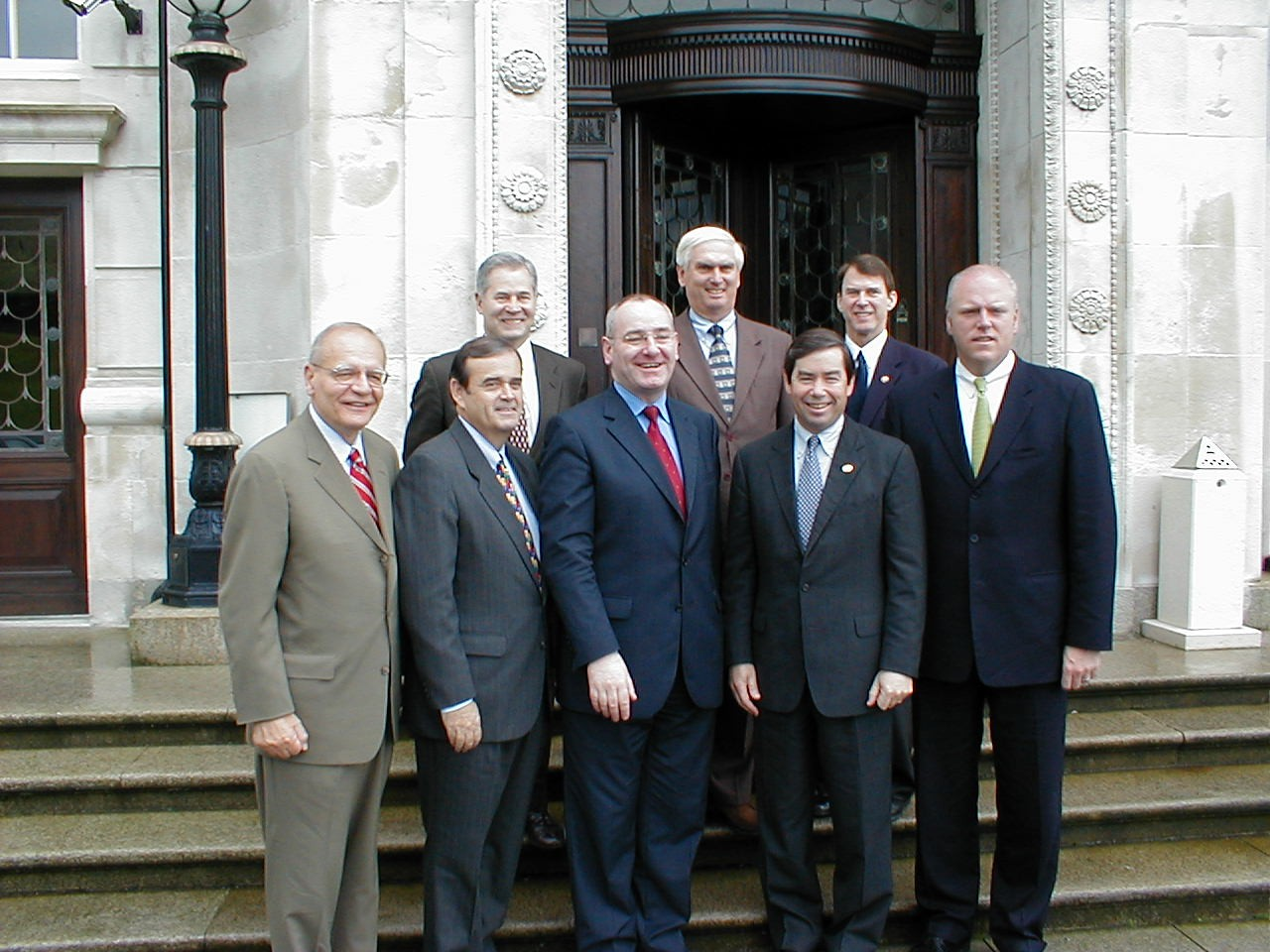
Durkan with members of the United States House of Representatives at Stormont in 2002

He became involved in politics in 1981 when he became a member of the Social Democratic and Labour Party. In 1984 he went to work for John Hume as his Westminster Assistant. He became a key figure in organising by-election campaigns for Seamus Mallon and Eddie McGrady in the 1980s.

In 1990 Durkan became chairperson of the SDLP, a position he served in until 1995. He was a key member of the party's negotiating team in the run up to the Good Friday Agreement. Following the Agreement he was elected to the Northern Ireland Assembly in 1998, and became a member of the Northern Ireland Executive as Minister for Finance and Personnel. He served in that position until 2001 when he replaced Seamus Mallon as deputy First Minister. He was also elected Leader of the SDLP the same year.

Durkan was re-elected to the Assembly in the election of November 2003. However, the Assembly and the Executive remained suspended. In the 2005 general election he retained the Foyle seat at Westminster for the SDLP, succeeding John Hume. While down on Hume's vote, Durkan won with a comfortable majority, despite a strong effort by Sinn Féin to take the seat. He garnered 21,119 votes, 46.3% of the total.

Durkan announced his intention to stand down as leader of the SDLP in September 2009 so he could concentrate on his parliamentary career. He was replaced as leader by Margaret Ritchie in February 2010. He is a Fellow of the British-American Project.

Durkan has publicly supported gay rights by supporting the Foyle Pride Festival in Derry, in solidarity with those who suffer homophobic prejudice and in some cases violent hate attacks.

In 2011, he voted against the military intervention in Libya.

He joined Fine Gael in March 2019 to contest the 2019 European Parliament election for the Dublin constituency but failed to gain a seat. He is now retired from frontline politics, but remains an active member and supporter of the SDLP.

== Family ==
He and his wife Jackie have one child, Dearbháil. His nephew Mark H. Durkan is an SDLP MLA for Foyle.

Northern Ireland Forum
New forum	Member for Foyle; 1996–1998	Forum dissolved
Northern Ireland Assembly
New assembly Good Friday Agreement	Member of the Legislative Assembly for Foyle; 1998–2010	Succeeded by Pol Callaghan
Parliament of the United Kingdom
Preceded by John Hume	Member of Parliament for Foyle; 2005–2017	Succeeded by Elisha McCallion
Political offices
New office Good Friday Agreement	Minister of Finance and Personnel; 1999–2001	Succeeded by Sean Farren
Preceded by Seamus Mallon	deputy First Minister of Northern Ireland; 2001–2002	Vacant Office suspended Title next held by Martin McGuinness
Party political offices
Preceded by Alban Maginness	Chairman of the Social Democratic and Labour Party; 1990–1995	Succeeded by Jonathan Stephenson
Preceded by John Hume	Leader of the Social Democratic and Labour Party; 2001–2010	Succeeded by Margaret Ritchie
