= Maeve McLaughlin =

Irish Sinn Féin politician

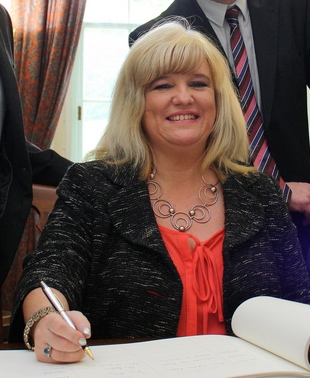

Member of the Northern Ireland Assembly for Foyle
- In office 18 June 2012 – 7 May 2016
- Preceded by: Martina Anderson
- Succeeded by: Martin McGuinness

Member of Derry City Council
- In office 7 June 2001 – 22 May 2014
- Preceded by: Marion Hutcheon
- Succeeded by: Council abolished
- Constituency: Northland

Personal details
- Born: 24 September 1968 (age 58) Derry, Northern Ireland
- Party: Sinn Féin
- Education: NUI Galway
- Occupation: Politician

Maeve McLaughlin (born 24 September 1968) is an Irish Sinn Féin politician who was a Member of the Northern Ireland Assembly (MLA) for Foyle from 2012 to 2016.

== Background ==
She was chosen to replace Martina Anderson, and took office in June 2012.

She previously sat on Derry City Council, having been elected in 2001. She received a BA (with honours) in Sociology, History and Politics, and was active in politics during her time at University College Galway.

McLaughlin lost her seat in the 2016 Assembly election.

Northern Ireland Assembly
Preceded by Martina Anderson	MLA for Foyle; 2012–2016	Succeeded by Martin McGuinness
