= Foyle (Assembly constituency) =

Constituency of the Northern Ireland Assembly

Coordinates: 55.052°N 7.245°W

- Northern Ireland Assembly; Parliamentary constituency
- Foyle shown within Northern Ireland

Current constituency
- Created: 1996
- Seats: 6 (1996–2016); 5 (2017–)
- MLAs: Pádraig Delargy (SF); Mark H. Durkan (SDLP); Ciara Ferguson (SF); Sinead McLaughlin (SDLP); Julie Middleton (DUP)
- Districts: Derry and Strabane District Council

Foyle is a constituency in the Northern Ireland Assembly.

The seat was first used for a Northern Ireland-only election for the Northern Ireland Forum in 1996. Since 1998, it has elected members to the current Assembly.

For Assembly elections prior to 1996, the constituency was largely part of the Londonderry constituency. Since 1997, it has shared boundaries with the Foyle UK Parliament constituency.

For further details of the history and boundaries of the constituency, see Foyle (UK Parliament constituency).

== Members ==
Election	MLA (party)	MLA (party)	MLA (party)	MLA (party)	MLA (party)	MLA (party)
1996	Martin McGuinness (Sinn Féin)	Mitchel McLaughlin (Sinn Féin)	John Tierney (SDLP)	Mark Durkan (SDLP)	John Hume (SDLP)	5 seats 1996–1998
1998	Mary Nelis (Sinn Féin)	Mitchel McLaughlin (Sinn Féin)	John Tierney (SDLP)	Mark Durkan (SDLP)	John Hume (SDLP)	William Hay (DUP)
December 2000 co-option	Mary Nelis (Sinn Féin)	Mitchel McLaughlin (Sinn Féin)	John Tierney (SDLP)	Mark Durkan (SDLP)	Annie Courtney (SDLP)	William Hay (DUP)
2003	Mary Nelis (Sinn Féin)	Mitchel McLaughlin (Sinn Féin)	Pat Ramsey (SDLP)	Mark Durkan (SDLP)	Mary Bradley (SDLP)	William Hay (DUP)
July 2004 co-option	Raymond McCartney (Sinn Féin)	Mitchel McLaughlin (Sinn Féin)	Pat Ramsey (SDLP)	Mark Durkan (SDLP)	Mary Bradley (SDLP)	William Hay (DUP)
2007	Raymond McCartney (Sinn Féin)	Martina Anderson (Sinn Féin)	Pat Ramsey (SDLP)	Mark Durkan (SDLP)	Mary Bradley (SDLP)	William Hay (DUP)
November 2010 co-option	Raymond McCartney (Sinn Féin)	Martina Anderson (Sinn Féin)	Pat Ramsey (SDLP)	Pól Callaghan (SDLP)	Mary Bradley (SDLP)	William Hay (DUP)
2011	Raymond McCartney (Sinn Féin)	Martina Anderson (Sinn Féin)	Pat Ramsey (SDLP)	Mark H. Durkan (SDLP)	Colum Eastwood (SDLP)	William Hay (DUP)
June 2012 co-option	Raymond McCartney (Sinn Féin)	Maeve McLaughlin (Sinn Féin)	Pat Ramsey (SDLP)	Mark H. Durkan (SDLP)	Colum Eastwood (SDLP)	William Hay (DUP)
October 2014 co-option	Raymond McCartney (Sinn Féin)	Maeve McLaughlin (Sinn Féin)	Pat Ramsey (SDLP)	Mark H. Durkan (SDLP)	Colum Eastwood (SDLP)	Maurice Devenney (DUP)
April 2015 co-option	Raymond McCartney (Sinn Féin)	Maeve McLaughlin (Sinn Féin)	Pat Ramsey (SDLP)	Mark H. Durkan (SDLP)	Colum Eastwood (SDLP)	Gary Middleton (DUP)
December 2015 co-option	Raymond McCartney (Sinn Féin)	Maeve McLaughlin (Sinn Féin)	Gerard Diver (SDLP)	Mark H. Durkan (SDLP)	Colum Eastwood (SDLP)	Gary Middleton (DUP)
2016	Raymond McCartney (Sinn Féin)	Martin McGuinness (Sinn Féin)	Eamonn McCann (PBP)	Mark H. Durkan (SDLP)	Colum Eastwood (SDLP)	Gary Middleton (DUP)
2017	Raymond McCartney (Sinn Féin)	Elisha McCallion (Sinn Féin)	5 seats 2017–present	Mark H. Durkan (SDLP)	Colum Eastwood (SDLP)	Gary Middleton (DUP)
June 2017 co-option	Raymond McCartney (Sinn Féin)	Karen Mullan (Sinn Féin)	5 seats 2017–present	Mark H. Durkan (SDLP)	Colum Eastwood (SDLP)	Gary Middleton (DUP)
January 2020 co-option	Raymond McCartney (Sinn Féin)	Karen Mullan (Sinn Féin)	5 seats 2017–present	Mark H. Durkan (SDLP)	Sinead McLaughlin (SDLP)	Gary Middleton (DUP)
February 2020 co-option	Martina Anderson (Sinn Féin)	Karen Mullan (Sinn Féin)	5 seats 2017–present	Mark H. Durkan (SDLP)	Sinead McLaughlin (SDLP)	Gary Middleton (DUP)
September 2021 co-option	Ciara Ferguson (Sinn Féin)	Pádraig Delargy (Sinn Féin)	5 seats 2017–present	Mark H. Durkan (SDLP)	Sinead McLaughlin (SDLP)	Gary Middleton (DUP)
2022	Ciara Ferguson (Sinn Féin)	Pádraig Delargy (Sinn Féin)	5 seats 2017–present	Mark H. Durkan (SDLP)	Sinead McLaughlin (SDLP)	Gary Middleton (DUP)
April 2026 co-option	Ciara Ferguson (Sinn Féin)	Pádraig Delargy (Sinn Féin)	5 seats 2017–present	Mark H. Durkan (SDLP)	Sinead McLaughlin (SDLP)	Julie Middleton (DUP)

Note: The columns in this table are used only for presentational purposes, and no significance should be attached to the order of columns. For details of the order in which seats were won at each election, see the detailed results of that election.

== Elections ==
=== Northern Ireland Assembly ===
==== 2027 ====
2027 Assembly election: Foyle – 5 seats
Party	Candidate	FPv%	Count
Party	Candidate	FPv%	1
Aontú	Emmet Doyle		
Sinn Féin	Sandra Duffy		
Sinn Féin	Ciara Ferguson		
UUP	Darren Guy		
Sinn Féin	Christopher Jackson		

==== 2022 ====
2022 Assembly election: Foyle – 5 seats
Party	Candidate	FPv%	Count												
Party	Candidate	FPv%	1	2	3	4	5	6	7	8	9	10	11	12	13
Sinn Féin	**Pádraig Delargy**	20.20%	**9,471**												
SDLP	**Mark H. Durkan**	17.06%	**7,999**												
Sinn Féin	**Ciara Ferguson**	12.61%	5,913	7,237	7,248	7,257	7,257	7,373	7,424	7,630	**7,873**				
SDLP	**Sinead McLaughlin**	6.80%	3,189	3,250	3,269	3,358	3,359	3,410	3,449	4,236	4,411	4,432	7,490	**8,605**	
DUP	**Gary Middleton**	8.75%	4,101	4,101	4,108	4,109	4,391	4,392	4,428	4,478	4,654	4,655	4,675	4,713	**4,731**
UUP	Ryan McCready	7.98%	3,744	3,746	3,752	3,754	3,948	3,950	3,961	4,244	4,282	4,283	4,326	4,515	4,635
People Before Profit	Shaun Harkin	5.59%	2,621	2,672	2,741	2,751	2,754	2,902	3,014	3,446	4,011	4,033	4,264		
SDLP	Brian Tierney	6.98%	3,272	3,293	3,307	3,333	3,333	3,413	3,448	3,709	3,951	3,967			
Aontú	Emmet Doyle	4.26%	2,000	2,041	2,045	2,049	2,050	2,176	2,609	2,697					
Alliance	Rachael Ferguson	4.73%	2,220	2,274	2,333	2,346	2,351	2,368	2,404						
Independent	Anne McCloskey	1.82%	854	864	869	870	877	946							
Irish Republican Socialist	Colly McLaughlin	1.63%	766	782	784	786	786								
TUV	Elizabeth Neely	1.06%	499	499	502	502									
Green (NI)	Gillian Hamilton	0.45%	215	219											
Electorate: 77,343 Valid: 46,864 (60.59%) Spoilt: 810 Quota: 7,811 Turnout: 47,674 (61.64%)

==== 2017 ====
2017 Assembly election: Foyle – 5 seats
Party	Candidate	FPv%	Count					
Party	Candidate	FPv%	1	2	3	4	5	6
Sinn Féin	**Elisha McCallion**	20.63%	**9,205**					
Sinn Féin	**Raymond McCartney**	16.01%	7,145	**8,608.76**				
SDLP	**Colum Eastwood**	16.23%	7,240	7,332.53	**7,595.3**			
SDLP	**Mark H. Durkan**	15.57%	6,948	7,023.05	7,275.56	7,380.68	**8,413.68**	
DUP	**Gary Middleton**	13.39%	5,975	5,975	5,976.71	6,008.09	6,902.37	**7,036.37**
People Before Profit	Eamonn McCann	10.67%	4,760	4,850.63	5,086.8	5,291.63	5,922.16	6,373.16
UUP	Julia Kee	3.72%	1,660	1,661.52	1,668.93	1,704.5		
Alliance	Colm Cavanagh	2.52%	1,124	1,132.93	1,179.67	1,295.22		
Green (NI)	Shannon Downey	0.54%	242	244.09	264.42			
Citizens Independent Social Thought Alliance	John Lindsay	0.44%	196	199.61	225.45			
NI Conservatives	Stuart Canning	0.17%	77	77.19	78.9			
Independent	Arthur McGuinness	0.10%	44	44.57	56.35			
Electorate: 69,718 Valid: 44,616 (63.99%) Spoilt: 701 Quota: 7,437 Turnout: 45,317 (65.00%)

==== 2016 ====
2016 Assembly election: Foyle – 6 seats
Party	Candidate	FPv%	Count							
Party	Candidate	FPv%	1	2	3	4	5	6	7	8
DUP	**Gary Middleton**	11.93%	4,737	4,770	4,772	**6,641**				
Sinn Féin	**Raymond McCartney**	8.06%	3,198	3,220	3,270	3,271	3,274	**5,676**		
SDLP	**Mark H. Durkan**	10.57%	4,197	4,268	4,395	4,527	4,744	4,801	**6,905**	
SDLP	**Colum Eastwood**	12.59%	5,000	5,069	5,111	5,217	5,376	5,401	**5,804**	
Sinn Féin	**Martin McGuinness**	12.69%	5,037	5,070	5,168	5,175	5,176	5,656	**5,712**	
People Before Profit	**Eamonn McCann**	10.52%	4,176	4,354	4,551	4,635	4,720	4,779	4,927	**5,394**
Independent	Anne McCloskey	8.59%	3,410	3,484	3,683	3,754	3,832	3,886	3,974	4,227
SDLP	Gerard Diver	6.80%	2,700	2,743	2,797	2,974	3,239	3,249		
Sinn Féin	Maeve McLaughlin	7.71%	3,062	3,072	3,114	3,114	3,114			
UUP	Julia Kee	3.58%	1,420	1,477	1,484					
Independent	Maurice Devenney	2.95%	1,173	1,190	1,213					
Independent	Kathleen Bradley	2.27%	902	928						
CISTA	John Lindsay	0.65%	259							
Alliance	Chris McCaw	0.60%	238							
Green (NI)	Mary Hassan	0.40%	157							
NI Conservatives	Alan Dunlop	0.09%	36							
Electorate: 71,759 Valid: 39,702 (55.33%) Spoilt: 485 Quota: 5,672 Turnout: 40,187 (56.00%)

==== 2011 ====
2011 Assembly election: Foyle – 6 seats
Party	Candidate	FPv%	Count						
Party	Candidate	FPv%	1	2	3	4	5	6	7
DUP	**William Hay**	18.42%	**7,154**						
Sinn Féin	**Martina Anderson**	17.89%	**6,950**						
SDLP	**Mark H. Durkan**	12.79%	4,970	5,382.28	5,484.28	**5,794.28**			
Sinn Féin	**Raymond McCartney**	9.36%	3,638	3,641.96	3,904.16	4,043.96	4,102.36	4,116.36	**6,245.36**
SDLP	**Colum Eastwood**	7.64%	2,967	3,069.08	3,101.08	3,402.8	5,376.76	5,500.76	**5,562.76**
SDLP	**Pat Ramsey**	8.08%	3,138	3,682.72	3,716.52	4,088.72	4,554.32	4,626.32	**4,875.92**
People Before Profit	Eamonn McCann	8.03%	3,120	3,208.88	3,255.48	3,587.12	3,697.8	3,719.8	3,915.68
Sinn Féin	Paul Fleming	6.72%	2,612	2,615.96	3,433.56	3,502.64	3,607.08	3,615.08	
SDLP	Pól Callaghan	6.75%	2,624	2,691.32	2,730.12	2,890.56			
Independent	Paul McFadden	3.29%	1,280	1,336.32	1,352.72				
Alliance	Keith McGrellis	0.86%	334	621.32	621.72				
Independent	Terry Doherty	0.15%	60	79.36	81.96				
Electorate: 68,663 Valid: 38,847 (56.58%) Spoilt: 839 Quota: 5,550 Turnout: 39,686 (57.80%)

==== 2007 ====
2007 Assembly election: Foyle – 6 seats
Party	Candidate	FPv%	Count									
Party	Candidate	FPv%	1	2	3	4	5	6	7	8	9	10
DUP	**William Hay**	16.96%	**6,960**									
SDLP	**Mark Durkan**	15.60%	**6,401**									
Sinn Féin	**Martina Anderson**	13.19%	5,414	5,415.28	5,448.6	5,461.96	5,611.04	**5,972.04**				
Sinn Féin	**Raymond McCartney**	10.53%	4,321	4,325.48	4,341.48	4,358.92	4,565.08	4,871.36	4,883.4	**7,275.4**		
SDLP	**Pat Ramsey**	7.90%	3,242	3,279.44	3,356.04	3,458.44	3,617.24	4,018.84	4,826.28	5,049.64	5,367.64	**5,395.99**
SDLP	**Mary Bradley**	7.05%	2,891	2,900.92	2,984.08	3,101.68	3,223.08	3,582.88	3,920.92	4,088.64	4,375.64	**4,418.57**
SDLP	Helen Quigley	6.45%	2,648	2,660.8	2,752.12	2,963.32	3,154.36	3,520.2	3,949.08	4,072.6	4,277.6	4,314.05
Sinn Féin	Lynn Fleming	7.10%	2,914	2,914.96	2,938.12	2,951.32	3,036.4	3,231.2	3,240.24			
UUP	Peter Munce	4.33%	1,755	2,691.32	2,853.36	2,861.52	2,862.68	2,920.56				
Socialist Environmental	Eamonn McCann	4.98%	2,045	2,053.32	2,167.8	2,187.4	2,775.04					
Ind. Republican	Peggy O'Hara	4.36%	1,789	1,789.48	1,808.48	1,811.68						
Green (NI)	Adele Corry	0.87%	359	365.56								
Alliance	Yvonne Boyle	0.55%	224	231.52								
Ind. Unionist	Willie Frazer	0.18%	73	99.72								
Electorate: 64,889 Valid: 41,036 (63.24%) Spoilt: 419 Quota: 5,863 Turnout: 41,455 (63.89%)

==== 2003 ====
2003 Assembly election: Foyle – 6 seats
Party	Candidate	FPv%	Count								
Party	Candidate	FPv%	1	2	3	4	5	6	7	8	9
SDLP	**Mark Durkan**	16.68%	**6,806**								
DUP	**William Hay**	14.95%	**6,101**								
Sinn Féin	**Mitchel McLaughlin**	14.79%	**6,036**								
SDLP	**Mary Bradley**	8.20%	3,345	3,599.24	3,600.44	3,603.32	3,830.75	4,758.76	5,256.63	**5,930.63**	
SDLP	**Pat Ramsey**	6.93%	2,826	3,166.62	3,169.02	3,173.88	3,334.15	4,178.08	4,679.06	5,697.56	**5,764.2**
Sinn Féin	**Mary Nelis**	8.57%	3,499	3,534.7	3,534.94	3,642.61	3,726.27	3,784.01	4,338.24	4,350.99	**4,351.27**
Sinn Féin	Raymond McCartney	9.02%	3,679	3,701.12	3,701.24	3,754.25	3,818.43	3,882.87	4,324.4	4,341.4	4,342.8
UUP	Mary Hamilton	8.14%	3,322	3,332.5	3,536.82	3,536.94	3,720.32	3,750.22	3,805.01		
Socialist Environmental	Eamonn McCann	5.53%	2,257	2,288.64	2,289.68	2,294.51	2,488.09	2,586.03			
SDLP	Gerard Diver	4.34%	1,769	1,978.3	1,979.94	1,982.43	2,152.55				
Independent	Annie Courtney	1.97%	802	835.18	843.26	845.57					
Alliance	Alan Castle	0.56%	227	231.62	233.14	233.26					
Independent	Danny McBrearty	0.34%	137	140.64	141.16	141.55					
Electorate: 65,303 Valid: 40,806 (62.49%) Spoilt: 630 Quota: 5,830 Turnout: 41,436 (63.45%)

==== 1998 ====
1998 Assembly election: Foyle – 6 seats
Party	Candidate	FPv%	Count							
Party	Candidate	FPv%	1	2	3	4	5	6	7	8
SDLP	**John Hume**	25.78%	**12,581**							
Sinn Féin	**Mitchel McLaughlin**	10.95%	5,341	5,867.5	5,977	6,007.9	**7,042.9**			
SDLP	**Mark Durkan**	9.06%	4,423	6,403	6,523.4	6,812.9	6,873.65	**6,979.9**		
SDLP	**John Tierney**	7.74%	3,778	5,295.4	5,349.65	5,457.2	5,494.6	5,600.6	**7,812.6**	
Sinn Féin	**Mary Nelis**	7.10%	3,464	3,592.25	3,643.2	3,659.35	3,838.3	6,210.2	6,593.85	**7,171.85**
DUP	**William Hay**	12.53%	6,112	6,128.2	6,240.45	6,293.8	6,295.8	6,296.8	6,315.25	**6,322.25**
UUP	Jack Allen	9.57%	4,669	4,714.9	4,920.05	5,353.7	5,354.6	5,355.6	5,501.25	5,698.25
SDLP	Annie Courtney	5.25%	2,560	3,442	3,517.55	3,760.95	3,813.3	3,843.05		
Sinn Féin	Gearóid Ó hEára	5.19%	2,531	2,608.4	2,638.1	2,654.9	2,733.55			
Sinn Féin	Lynn Fleming	2.79%	1,360	1,460.8	1,518.55	1,530.8				
Alliance	Colm Cavanagh	2.17%	1,058	1,200.65	1,347.35					
Labour Party NI	Ken Adams	0.71%	345	403.95						
PUP	Brian Gurney	0.59%	287	305						
Green (NI)	Peter MacKenzie	0.52%	253	294.85						
Natural Law	Donn Brennan	0.07%	32	36.5						
Electorate: 68,888 Valid: 48,794 (70.83%) Spoilt: 810 Quota: 6,971 Turnout: 49,604 (72.01%)

=== 1996 forum ===
Successful candidates are shown in bold.

Party	Candidate(s)	Votes	Percentage
SDLP	**John Hume**; **Mark Durkan**; **John Tierney**; Pat Devine; Mary Bradley	19,997	44.3
Sinn Féin	**Martin McGuinness**; **Mitchel McLaughlin**; Mary Nelis; Moira McCloskey; Gary Fleming	11,618	25.7
DUP	Gregory Campbell; William Hay	5,504	11.2
UUP	Jack Allen; Richard Dallas; Andrew Davidson	4,553	10.1
Alliance	Aaron McCormack; Gerry Lynch	790	1.7
NI Women's Coalition	Margaret Logue; Diane Greer; Teresa Kelly	695	1.5
PUP	Brian Gurney; Paul Whitlock	580	1.3
Labour coalition	Margaret Lawrence; Jim Gannon; Geraldine Quigley; Tony Martin; Patrick Muldowney	544	1.2
Ulster Democratic	David Nicholl; Thomas Stone	497	1.1
UK Unionist	David Taylor; Richard Jordan	324	0.7
Green (NI)	Peter Doran; Michael O'Kane; Chloe Wilson	194	0.4
NI Conservatives	Derek Sloan; Elizabeth Sloan	92	0.2
Workers' Party	Noel Lynch; Alexander Doherty	81	0.2
Ulster Independence	Donal Casey; Ken Kerr	65	0.1
Natural Law	Donn Brennan; David Cooke	41	0.1
Democratic Left	James Doody; Brian Cullen	40	0.1
Independent Chambers	Sydney Waddell; Jason Angus	22	0.1
