= Mary Bradley (politician) =

Irish nationalist politician (1942–2025)

Member of the Northern Ireland Assembly for Foyle
- In office 26 November 2003 – 2011
- Preceded by: Annie Courtney
- Succeeded by: Colum Eastwood

Personal details
- Born: 10 May 1942 Derry, Northern Ireland
- Died: 30 December 2025 (aged 83)
- Party: Social Democratic and Labour Party

Mary Bradley (10 May 1942 – 30 December 2025) was an Irish Social Democratic and Labour Party (SDLP) politician who was a Member of the Northern Ireland Assembly (MLA) for Foyle from 2003 to 2011.

== Life and career ==
Born in Derry on 10 May 1942, Bradley attended the North West Institute of Further and Higher Education before working as a care assistant.

In 1985, she was elected to Derry City Council, representing the SDLP) and from 1991–92 she served as the Mayor of Derry. In 1996 she was an unsuccessful candidate in the Northern Ireland Forum election in Foyle. In 2003, Bradley was elected to represent Foyle in the Northern Ireland Assembly and re-elected in 2007, but did not stand for election in 2011.

Bradley was a member of the Western Education Library Board and a commissioner on the Harbour board.

She was married to Liam and had one daughter, Paula, and two grandchildren. Bradley lived on the Carnhill Estate in Derry for over 30 years. Bradley died on 30 December 2025, at the age of 83.

Civic offices
Preceded by David Davis	Mayor of Derry; 1991–1992	Succeeded by William Hay
Northern Ireland Assembly
Preceded by Annie Courtney	MLA for Foyle; 2003–2011	Succeeded by Colum Eastwood
