= Derry City Council =

Former local government authority in Northern Ireland

Coordinates: 55.000°N 7.333°W

- Area: 387 km^{2} (149 sq mi); Ranked 18th of 26
- District HQ: Derry
- Catholic: 60%
- Protestant: 30%
- Country: Northern Ireland
- Sovereign state: United Kingdom
- Councillors: 40

Derry in Northern Ireland

Londonderry City Council (later Derry City Council) (Irish: Comhairle Cathrach Dhoire; Ulster-Scots: Derry Cittie Cooncil) was the local government authority for the city of Derry (Note: There is a longstanding Derry/Londonderry name dispute. This article follows the approach that Derry refers to the city and County Londonderry refers to the county (outside of organisations' names, which may follow their own approaches).) in Northern Ireland. It merged with Strabane District Council in April 2015 under local government reorganisation to become Derry and Strabane District Council.

The council provided services to nearly 108,000 people, making it the third-largest of the then 26 district councils in Northern Ireland by population. The council was made up of 30 councillors, elected every four years from five electoral areas and held its meetings in the Guildhall. The mayor for the final 2014–2015 term was Brenda Stevenson of the Social Democratic and Labour Party, with Gary Middleton of the Democratic Unionist Party serving as deputy mayor.

== History ==
The district was formed in 1973 under the Local Government (Boundaries) Act (Northern Ireland) 1971 and the Local Government Act (Northern Ireland) 1972 by merging Londonderry county borough and Londonderry rural district, which had been jointly administered since 1969 by the unelected Londonderry Development Commission. The rural district covered an area around the county borough, roughly corresponding to the baronies of Tirkeeran and North West Liberties of Londonderry. The Development Commission, formed with the aim of creating a "new town", replaced both Londonderry Corporation, which had run the city since 1613, and Londonderry Rural District Council, which dated from the Local Government (Ireland) Act 1898.

== Name of council and city ==
In 1984, it voted to rename itself from "Londonderry City Council" to "Derry City Council", which was adopted by order. At that time, it did not seek to change the name of the city from "Londonderry" in its charter. The name change led to a temporary unionist boycott of the council which was broken by two UUP councillors, Jim Guy and David Davis. They were expelled from their party for this but successfully contested the subsequent elections as Independent Unionists. Unionists also called for the establishment of a separate "Waterside" council covering the East Bank and rural areas, but this was rejected by the Local Government Boundary Commission in 1991. In 1993, David Davis lost his seat with the result that there were no unionist councillors from the West Bank, and in 2005 for the first time, no unionist stood for election in the West Bank. At the same time the council also changed the name of the municipally-owned airport from Londonderry Eglinton Airport to City of Derry Airport.

In Derry City Council, Re Application for Judicial Review (2007), the High Court of Northern Ireland ruled that although the name of the council had changed, the name of the city itself remained that of Londonderry in its charter. The city itself retained the name "Londonderry".

== Coat of arms and motto ==
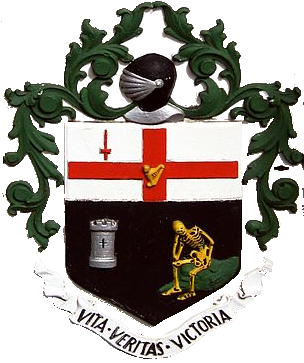
Coat of arms

The devices on the city's arms are a skeleton and a three-towered castle on a black field, with the chief or top third of the shield depicting the arms of the City of London: a red cross and sword on white. In the centre of the cross is a gold harp. The blazon of the arms is as follows:

Sable, a human skeleton Or seated upon a mossy stone proper and in dexter chief a castle triple towered argent on a chief also argent a cross gules thereon a harp or and in the first quarter a sword erect gules.

According to documents in the College of Arms in London and the Office of the Chief Herald of Ireland in Dublin, the arms of the city were confirmed in 1613 by Daniel Molyneux, Ulster King of Arms. The College of Arms document states that the original arms of the City of Derry were ye picture of death (or a skeleton) on a moissy stone & in ye dexter point a castle and that upon grant of a charter of incorporation and the renaming of the city as Londonderry in that year the first mayor had requested the addition of a "chief of London".

Theories have been advanced as to the meaning of the "old" arms of Derry, before the addition of the chief bearing the arms of the City of London:

- That the castle is related to an early 14th-century castle in nearby Greencastle belonging to the Anglo-Norman Earl of Ulster Richard de Burgh
- The most popular theory about the skeleton is that it is that of a Norman De Burgh knight who was starved to death in the castle dungeons in 1332 on the orders of his cousin the above-mentioned Earl of Ulster. Another explanation put forward was that it depicted Cahir O'Doherty (Sir Charles O'Dogherty), who was put to death after Derry was invested by the English Army in 1608.

In 1979, Londonderry City Council, as it was then known, commissioned a report into the city's arms and insignia, as part of the design process for an heraldic badge. The published report found that there was no basis for any of the popular explanations for the skeleton and that it was "purely symbolic and does not refer to any identifiable person".

The 1613 records of the arms depicted a harp in the centre of the cross, but this was omitted from later depictions of the city arms, and in the letters patent confirming the arms to Londonderry Corporation in 1952. In 2002 Derry City Council applied to the College of Arms to have the harp restored to the city arms, and Garter and Norroy & Ulster Kings of Arms accepted the 17th century evidence, issuing letters patent to that effect in 2003.

The motto attached to the coat of arms reads in Latin, "Vita, Veritas, Victoria". This translates into English as, "Life, Truth, Victory".

== Mayor ==
The Mayor of Derry was an honorary position bestowed upon a citizen of Derry, who was in practice a member of Derry City Council, The council selected a member of the council to serve a one-year term. The last mayor of Derry City Council was Brenda Stevenson of the SDLP, while Gary Middleton of the DUP was the last deputy mayor of Derry City Council.

The post has a long history. A provost was appointed in the initial city charter of 1604. In 1613, this post was replaced with that of mayor, with John Rowley being the first to serve. The City charter of 1665 which provided:

And further we will, and by these presents for us our heirs and successors do grant and ordain, that for ever hereafter there be and shall be within the city of Londonderry aforesaid one of the more honest and discreet citizens of the said city, or of the more honest and discreet inhabitants within the liberty of the same, in form hereafter in these presents mentioned, from time to time to be elected, who shall be and called the mayor of the said city.

During much of its history, it has been held by Unionists (largely due to the practice of gerrymandering), but in later years, the majority of mayors were nationalists, reflecting the make-up of the city's population and council. In the 1990s, the post was alternated between nationalist and unionist councillors regardless of the size of the vote of either side.

From 1921 until 1969, the mayor was an ex officio member of the Senate of Northern Ireland.

== Political makeup ==
Map of the city's DEAs from 1993 to 2014

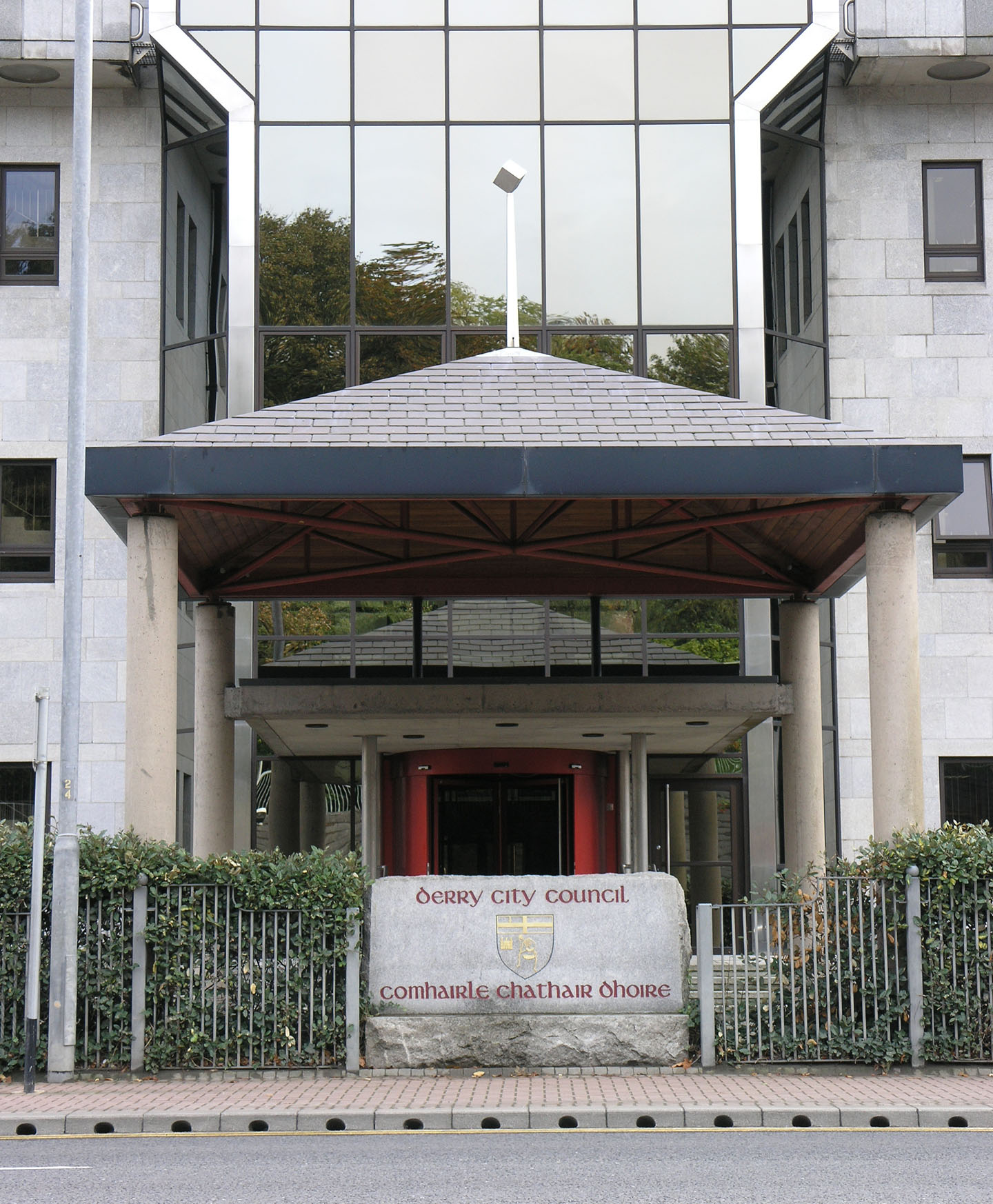
Council Headquarters, Strand Road, Derry

Prior to 1969, elections to the Londonderry county borough council were based on block voting. The electoral wards had been drawn and redrawn to ensure a unionist majority on the council even though more voters supported nationalist and republican parties. With local government reorganisation in 1973, the old county borough was merged with the surrounding Londonderry Rural District to form the new local government district of Londonderry. In addition, a system of STV was introduced which has resulted in a majority of councillors from nationalist and republican parties being elected, with the SDLP consistently being the largest party.

From 1973 elections to Derry City Council were conducted under the single transferable vote system, and are normally held every four years. Elections took place in five electoral areas, the boundaries of which were changed for the 1985 local elections, when the number of councillors was increased from 27 to its final figure of 30.

The last elections to Derry City Council were held on 5 May 2011, with the city's voters electing thirty councillors across five electoral areas. The election resulted in all four parties returning the same number of seats they had won in the 2005 elections, with the SDLP remaining the largest party, only two seats short of overall control of the council. The results are summarised below:

Darker coloured numbers indicate the SDLP had an absolute majority of councillors, lighter colours indicate largest party without a majority.

Party	1973	1977	1981	1985	1989	1993	1997	2001	2005	2011
Social Democratic and Labour Party	10	13	14	14	15	17	14	14	14	14
Sinn Féin				5	5	5	8	10	10	10
Democratic Unionist Party	9^{†}	2	5	5	4	5	4	4	5	5
Ulster Unionist Party	9^{†}	6	4	5	3	2	3	2	1	1
Alliance	4	2								
Nationalist Party/Irish Independence Party	3	4	4	1						
Independent Unionist					2	1	1			
Republican Clubs	1									
Ulster Democratic Party					1					
Total	27	27	27	30	30	30	30	30	30	30

^{†}Unionist parties fought the 1973 elections in an electoral pact, as United Loyalists. Of the 9 councillors elected under this label, 5 contested the 1977 elections for the UUP, 1 for the DUP, 1 for the Vanguard Unionist Progressive Party, 1 as a Loyalist, while one councillor did not stand again.

The Derry City Council area was largely coterminous with both the Foyle UK Parliament constituency (first used in 1983) and the Foyle Northern Ireland Assembly Constituency (first used in 1996). Boundary changes in advance of the 2010 general election transferred two wards in the east of the district from Foyle to East Londonderry. Foyle was represented by the SDLP from its creation until after the abolition of Derry City Council.

== Shadow Council ==
Derry formerly had a Shadow Council for young people, from about 1999 to 2008. This was made up from 16- to 22-year-olds elected from geographical areas in the city, as well as interest, political groups and also LGBT community groups. The Shadow Council worked in cooperation with Derry City Council and selected a "Junior Mayor" as its representative to the media and public.

== Population ==
The area covered by Derry City Council had a population of 107,877 residents according to the 2011 Northern Ireland census.

== See also ==
- Derry Urban Area
