= Cityside (District Electoral Area) =

District electoral areas in Derry, Northern Ireland

Cityside DEA (1993-2014) within Derry

Cityside was one of the five district electoral areas in Derry, Northern Ireland which existed from 1985 to 2014. The district elected six members to Derry City Council until 1993, and five members until 2014, and formed part of the Foyle constituencies for the Northern Ireland Assembly and UK Parliament.

It was created for the 1985 local elections, replacing Londonderry Area C which had existed since 1973, and contained the wards of Beechwood, Brandywell, Creggan Central, Creggan South, St. Peter's and Westland. For the 1993 local elections it was reduced by one ward, losing St. Peter's. It was abolished for the 2014 local elections and replaced with The Moor DEA.

== Councillors ==
Election	Councillor (party)	Councillor (party)	Councillor (party)	Councillor (party)	Councillor (party)	Councillor (party)
2011	Jim Clifford (SDLP)	Ann Donnelly (SDLP)	Colin Kelly (Sinn Féin)	Patricia Logue (Sinn Féin)	Kevin Campbell (Sinn Féin)	6 seats 1985–1993
2005	Jim Clifford (SDLP)	Pat Ramsey (SDLP)	Peter Anderson (Sinn Féin)	Patricia Logue (Sinn Féin)	Kevin Campbell (Sinn Féin)	6 seats 1985–1993
2001	Jim Clifford (SDLP)	Pat Ramsey (SDLP)	Peter Anderson (Sinn Féin)	Cathal Crumley (Sinn Féin)	Barney O'Hagan (Sinn Féin)	6 seats 1985–1993
1997	Jim Clifford (SDLP)	Pat Ramsey (SDLP)	Peter Anderson (Sinn Féin)	Cathal Crumley (Sinn Féin)	Mitchel McLaughlin (Sinn Féin)	6 seats 1985–1993
1993	Jim Clifford (SDLP)	Pat Ramsey (SDLP)	Patrick Devine (SDLP)	Bernadette Bradley (Sinn Féin)	Hugh Brady (Sinn Féin)	6 seats 1985–1993
1989	Jim Clifford (SDLP)	Tony Carlin (SDLP)	Patrick Devine (SDLP)	Anne McGuinness (Sinn Féin)	Hugh Brady (Sinn Féin)	Mitchel McLaughlin (Sinn Féin)
1985	Pat Ramsey (SDLP)	Tony Carlin (SDLP)	Patrick Devine (SDLP)	Anne McGuinness (Sinn Féin)	Hugh Brady (Sinn Féin)	Mitchel McLaughlin (Sinn Féin)

== 2011 election ==
2005: 3 x Sinn Féin, 2 x SDLP

2011: 3 x Sinn Féin, 2 x SDLP

2005-2011 change: No change

Cityside - 5 seats
Party	Candidate	FPv%	Count					
Party	Candidate	FPv%	1	2	3	4	5	6
SDLP	Jim Clifford*	21.42%	1,243					
Sinn Féin	Kevin Campbell*	20.66%	1,199					
Sinn Féin	Patricia Logue*	16.15%	937	947.32	963.32	975.32		
Sinn Féin	Colin Kelly	10.87%	631	637	659.6	667.36	694.64	1,005.64
SDLP	Ann Donnelly	5.36%	311	485	494.4	680.2	742.6	785.96
Independent	Gary Donnelly	10.55%	612	628.08	636.28	643.96	674.88	689.36
Sinn Féin	Liam Friel	6.74%	391	405.16	567.96	576.68	631.68	
People Before Profit	Connor Kelly	4.57%	265	269.32	272.92	280		
SDLP	Dermot Henderson	3.69%	214	263.2	268			
Electorate: 9,023 Valid: 5,803 (64.31%) Spoilt: 213 Quota: 968 Turnout: 6,016 (66.67%)

== 2005 election ==
2001: 3 x Sinn Féin, 2 x SDLP

2005: 3 x Sinn Féin, 2 x SDLP

2001-2005 change: No change

Cityside - 5 seats
Party	Candidate	FPv%	Count						
Party	Candidate	FPv%	1	2	3	4	5	6	7
SDLP	Pat Ramsey*	16.01%	980	1,016	1,104				
SDLP	Jim Clifford*	11.79%	722	742	1,035				
Sinn Féin	Peter Anderson*	16.29%	997	1,013	1,034				
Sinn Féin	Patricia Logue	13.08%	801	811	822	875	878.76	879.16	884.04
Sinn Féin	Kevin Campbell	11.37%	696	705	751	851	859.46	859.98	861.81
Sinn Féin	Barney O'Hagan*	12.46%	763	781	790	839	851.22	851.78	854.83
Independent	Gary Donnelly	8.05%	493	516	528				
SDLP	Liam Boyle	7.97%	488	512					
Socialist Environmental	Liam Friel	2.97%	182						
Electorate: 8,655 Valid: 6,122 (70.73%) Spoilt: 222 Quota: 1,021 Turnout: 6,344 (73.30%)

== 2001 election ==
1997: 3 x Sinn Féin, 2 x SDLP

2001: 3 x Sinn Féin, 2 x SDLP

1997-2001 change: No change

Cityside - 5 seats
Party	Candidate	FPv%	Count					
Party	Candidate	FPv%	1	2	3	4	5	6
SDLP	Pat Ramsey*	18.26%	1,210					
SDLP	Jim Clifford*	17.75%	1,176					
Sinn Féin	Cathal Crumley*	16.49%	1,093	1,122				
Sinn Féin	Peter Anderson*	14.92%	989	1,015	1,022.02	1,025.8	1,474.8	
Sinn Féin	Barney O'Hagan	10.32%	684	698	701.33	703.61	847.71	1,181.34
SDLP	Liam Boyle	9.49%	629	684	765.63	817.35	831.51	867.15
Sinn Féin	Donncha MacNiallais	9.33%	618	642	647.67	650.97		
Independent	Shauna Deery	3.44%	228					
Electorate: 9,244 Valid: 6,627 (71.69%) Spoilt: 303 Quota: 1,105 Turnout: 6,930 (74.97%)

== 1997 election ==
1993: 3 x SDLP, 2 x Sinn Féin

1997: 3 x Sinn Féin, 2 x SDLP

1993-1997 change: Sinn Féin gain from SDLP

Cityside - 5 seats
Party	Candidate	FPv%	Count					
Party	Candidate	FPv%	1	2	3	4	5	6
Sinn Féin	Cathal Crumley	20.61%	1,333					
Sinn Féin	Mitchel McLaughlin*	20.21%	1,307					
Sinn Féin	Peter Anderson	14.72%	952	979	1,213.27			
SDLP	Jim Clifford*	14.98%	969	1,042	1,047.7	1,115.64		
SDLP	Pat Ramsey*	12.71%	822	883	884.33	972.81	976.8	989.55
SDLP	Patrick Devine*	12.82%	829	881	884.42	955.52	961.41	986.16
NI Women's Coalition	Margaret Logue	3.94%	255					
Electorate: 9,432 Valid: 6,467 (68.56%) Spoilt: 194 Quota: 1,078 Turnout: 6,661 (70.62%)

== 1993 election ==
1989: 3 x SDLP, 3 x Sinn Féin

1993: 3 x SDLP, 2 x Sinn Féin

1989-1993 change: Sinn Féin loss due to the reduction of one seat

Cityside - 5 seats
Party	Candidate	FPv%	Count				
Party	Candidate	FPv%	1	2	3	4	5
Sinn Féin	Hugh Brady*	22.62%	1,363				
SDLP	Jim Clifford*	18.07%	1,089				
SDLP	Patrick Devine*	16.66%	1,004	1,016.69			
SDLP	Pat Ramsey	15.22%	917	925.64	991.4	1,024.71	
Sinn Féin	Bernadette Bradley	11.70%	705	893.73	896.21	910.45	941.5
Sinn Féin	Dominic Doherty	10.34%	623	751.25	753.17	755.22	771.35
Independent Labour	Anthony Martin	3.14%	189	193.86	198.98	248.24	
Workers' Party	Eamonn Melaugh	2.24%	135	138.51	144.35		
Electorate: 9,636 Valid: 6,025 (62.53%) Spoilt: 249 Quota: 1,005 Turnout: 6,274 (65.11%)

== 1989 election ==
1985: 3 x SDLP, 3 x Sinn Féin

1989: 3 x SDLP, 3 x Sinn Féin

1985-1989 change: No change

Cityside - 6 seats
Party	Candidate	FPv%	Count			
Party	Candidate	FPv%	1	2	3	4
SDLP	Patrick Devine*	17.15%	1,011			
Sinn Féin	Hugh Brady*	15.22%	897			
SDLP	Tony Carlin*	12.45%	734	786.7	859.7	
Sinn Féin	Mitchel McLaughlin*	11.84%	698	699.02	855.02	
Sinn Féin	Anne McGuinness*	11.13%	656	660.25	777.42	821.34
SDLP	Jim Clifford	10.86%	640	706.13	802.89	805.17
SDLP	Pat Ramsey*	11.27%	664	693.58	766.96	767.14
Workers' Party	Eamonn Melaugh	6.07%	358	366.67		
Sinn Féin	Gerry Doherty	4.00%	236	236.85		
Electorate: 9,973 Valid: 5,894 (59.10%) Spoilt: 232 Quota: 843 Turnout: 6,126 (61.43%)

== 1985 election ==
1985: 3 x SDLP, 3 x Sinn Féin

Cityside - 6 seats
Party	Candidate	FPv%	Count									
Party	Candidate	FPv%	1	2	3	4	5	6	7	8	9	10
SDLP	Patrick Devine*	12.94%	836	844	850	851	1,077					
Sinn Féin	Anne McGuinness	13.47%	870	883	891	909	918	918	981			
Sinn Féin	Hugh Brady	13.12%	848	857	875	890	893	893.73	967.73			
Sinn Féin	Mitchel McLaughlin	12.97%	838	850	854	900	908	908	960			
SDLP	Tony Carlin	10.85%	701	701	708	721	792	835.8	890.26	894.26	914.26	920.26
SDLP	Pat Ramsey	7.89%	510	513	515	551	643	671.47	698.66	704.66	712.66	716.66
SDLP	Jim Clifford	7.72%	499	501	513	548	592	662.08	693.08	697.08	702.08	703.08
Irish Independence	Liam Bradley*	5.71%	369	414	498	539	564	572.03				
SDLP	William Keys*	7.10%	459	463	467	492						
Workers' Party	Eamonn Melaugh	3.92%	253	256	277							
Irish Independence	Samuel Brown	2.23%	144	170								
Irish Independence	John McChrystal*	2.07%	134									
Electorate: 10,598 Valid: 6,461 (60.96%) Spoilt: 213 Quota: 924 Turnout: 6,674 (62.97%)
