= 1993 Derry City Council election =

Local govt election in Northern Ireland

- 19 May 1993

All 30 seats to Derry City Council 16 seats needed for a majority
	First party	Second party	Third party
Party	SDLP	Sinn Féin	DUP
Seats won	17	5	5
Seat change	▲2	0	▲1
	Fourth party	Fifth party	Sixth party
Party	UUP	Ind. Unionist	Ulster Democratic
Seats won	2	1	0
Seat change	▼1	▼1	▼1
- Party with the most votes by district.

Elections to Derry City Council were held on 19 May 1993 on the same day as the other Northern Irish local government elections. The election used five district electoral areas to elect a total of 30 councillors.

== Election results ==
Derry City Council Election Result 1993
Party	Seats	Gains	Losses	Net gain/loss	Seats %	Votes %	Votes	+/−
SDLP	17	2	0	▲2	56.7	46.9	18,053	▼2.8
Sinn Féin	5	1	1	0	16.7	20.2	7,778	▲3.8
DUP	5	1	0	▲1	16.7	13.3	5,142	▼0.2
UUP	2	0	1	▼1	6.7	9.2	3,544	▼1.0
Ind. Unionist	1	0	1	▼1	3.3	2.9	1,133	▼0.8
Independent Labour	0	0	0	0	0.0	2.6	985	▲2.6
Independent	0	0	0	0	0.0	2.0	777	▲2.0
Ulster Democratic	0	0	1	▼1	0.0	1.2	469	▼1.4
Alliance	0	0	0	0	0.0	1.0	369	▲0.4
Workers' Party	0	0	0	0	0.0	0.7	267	▼0.4

Note: "Votes" are the first preference votes.

== Districts summary ==
Results of the Derry City Council election, 1993 by district
Ward	%	Cllrs	%	Cllrs	%	Cllrs	%	Cllrs	%	Cllrs	Total Cllrs
Ward	SDLP		Sinn Féin		DUP		UUP		Others		Total Cllrs
Cityside	50.0	3	44.7	2	0.0	0	0.0	0	5.3	0	5
Northland	56.6	5	22.8	2	2.4	0	0.0	0	18.2	0	7
Rural	50.7	3	6.0	1	22.3	1	21.0	2	0.0	0	6
Shantallow	65.0	4	26.6	1	0.0	0	3.0	0	5.4	0	5
Waterside	18.8	2	8.6	0	37.0	3	17.9	1	17.7	1	7
Total	46.9	17	20.5	5	13.3	5	9.2	2	10.1	1	30

== District results ==
=== Cityside ===
1989: 3 x SDLP, 3 x Sinn Féin
1993: 3 x SDLP, 2 x Sinn Féin
1989-1993 Change: Sinn Féin loss due to the reduction of one seat

Cityside - 5 seats
Party	Candidate	FPv%	Count				
Party	Candidate	FPv%	1	2	3	4	5
Sinn Féin	Hugh Brady*	22.62%	1,363				
SDLP	Jim Clifford*	18.07%	1,089				
SDLP	Patrick Devine*	16.66%	1,004	1,016.69			
SDLP	Pat Ramsey	15.22%	917	925.64	991.4	1,024.71	
Sinn Féin	Bernadette Bradley	11.70%	705	893.73	896.21	910.45	941.5
Sinn Féin	Dominic Doherty	10.34%	623	751.25	753.17	755.22	771.35
Independent Labour	Anthony Martin	3.14%	189	193.86	198.98	248.24	
Workers' Party	Eamonn Melaugh	2.24%	135	138.51	144.35		
Electorate: 9,636 Valid: 6,025 (62.53%) Spoilt: 249 Quota: 1,005 Turnout: 6,274 (65.11%)

=== Northland ===
1989: 4 x SDLP, 1 x Sinn Féin, 1 x Independent Unionist
1993: 5 x SDLP, 2 x Sinn Féin
1989-1993 Change: SDLP and Sinn Féin gain from Independent Unionist and due to the addition of one seat

Northland - 7 seats
Party	Candidate	FPv%	Count											
Party	Candidate	FPv%	1	2	3	4	5	6	7	8	9	10	11	12
SDLP	John Tierney*	16.05%	1,506											
Sinn Féin	Mitchel McLaughlin*	14.70%	1,380											
SDLP	Mark Durkan	13.97%	1,311											
SDLP	Martin Bradley	12.38%	1,162	1,296.64										
SDLP	John Kerr*	7.57%	710	767.84	770.24	838.55	922.01	927.79	942.9	952.71	955.71	1,040.95	1,095.17	1,201.17
Sinn Féin	Mary Nelis	8.08%	758	772.16	949.91	951.34	952.64	961.75	962.75	970.44	970.44	982.7	1,000.7	1,040.7
SDLP	Kathleen McCloskey	6.60%	619	704.92	707.17	744.57	771.09	774.48	786.48	797.22	800.22	849.24	918.24	996.24
Ind. Unionist	David Davis*	5.50%	516	520.08	521.88	526.5	528.06	530.06	554.5	561.98	745.44	759.77	778.77	844.77
Independent	Tony Carlin	3.68%	345	354.36	358.86	366.56	369.68	373.09	382.79	389.29	393.4	450.36	525.36	
Independent Labour	Patrick Muldowney	1.99%	187	191.32	194.47	197.33	198.11	214.33	221.44	356.78	359.78	374.22		
Ind. Nationalist	William McCorriston*	3.10%	291	303.24	304.44	309.72	313.36	319.6	320.93	321.93	323.93			
UUP	Gladys Carey	2.46%	231	231.24	231.24	231.46	231.46	231.46	238.46	239.57				
Independent Labour	Richard Foster	1.86%	175	180.52	181.72	183.15	184.19	194.29	212.29					
Alliance	Nigel Cooke	1.24%	116	116.72	116.72	118.48	118.48	118.72						
Workers' Party	Gordon McKenzie	0.45%	42	42.96	43.26	43.81	44.33							
Workers' Party	Noel Lynch	0.38%	36	36.72	37.47	38.24	38.24							
Electorate: 15,645 Valid: 9,385 (59.99%) Spoilt: 240 Quota: 1,174 Turnout: 9,625 (61.52%)

=== Rural ===
1989: 3 x SDLP, 2 x DUP, 2 x UUP
1993: 3 x SDLP, 2 x DUP, 1 x UUP
1989-1993 Change: UUP loss due to the reduction of one seat

Rural - 6 seats
Party	Candidate	FPv%	Count							
Party	Candidate	FPv%	1	2	3	4	5	6	7	8
SDLP	Annie Courtney*	20.53%	1,545							
SDLP	John McNickle*	13.94%	1,049	1,310.76						
SDLP	George Peoples*	11.22%	844	932.96	974.72	975.72	1,091.72			
UUP	Richard Dallas	10.50%	790	797.68	797.68	935.32	937.32	937.86	1,444.86	
DUP	William Hay*	11.71%	881	885.48	886.35	911.67	912.67	912.94	983.26	1,156.26
DUP	Mervyn Lindsay*	9.25%	696	696.32	696.32	706.64	707.64	707.64	818.64	984.64
SDLP	Patrick Murray	5.04%	379	451.32	637.21	637.53	771	785.58	785.9	786.9
UUP	Ernest Hamilton*	6.75%	508	510.24	510.24	706.24	707.24	707.24		
Sinn Féin	Bernard McFadden	5.98%	450	466	468.32	468.32				
UUP	George Duddy	5.09%	383	384.92	384.92					
Electorate: 12,377 Valid: 7,525 (60.80%) Spoilt: 200 Quota: 1,076 Turnout: 7,725 (62.41%)

=== Shantallow ===
1989: 4 x SDLP, 1 x Sinn Féin
1993: 4 x SDLP, 1 x Sinn Féin
1989-1993 Change: No change

Shantallow - 5 seats
Party	Candidate	FPv%	Count				
Party	Candidate	FPv%	1	2	3	4	5
SDLP	Mary Bradley*	30.54%	1,976				
Sinn Féin	Gearóid Ó hEára*	17.25%	1,116				
SDLP	Shaun Gallagher*	11.93%	772	1,320.16			
SDLP	Margaret McCartney	11.36%	735	851.64	1,024.56	1,051.96	1,158.96
SDLP	William O'Connell*	11.17%	723	880.92	931.96	952.58	1,049.92
Sinn Féin	James McKnight	9.32%	603	619.8	624.42	628.9	665.62
Independent Labour	Robert Lindsay	4.56%	295	323.32	330.14	441.64	
DUP	William Dougherty	3.03%	196	201.76	201.98		
Workers' Party	Edward Sharkey	0.83%	54	61.68	63.22		
Electorate: 11,001 Valid: 6,470 (58.81%) Spoilt: 232 Quota: 1,079 Turnout: 6,702 (60.92%)

=== Waterside ===
1989: 2 x DUP, 1 x SDLP, 1 x UUP, 1 x UDP, 1 x Independent Unionist
1993: 3 x DUP, 2 x SDLP, 1 x UUP, 1 x Independent Unionist
1989-1993 Change: DUP and SDLP gain from UDP and due to the addition of one seat

Waterside - 7 seats
Party	Candidate	FPv%	Count											
Party	Candidate	FPv%	1	2	3	4	5	6	7	8	9	10	11	12
DUP	Gregory Campbell*	16.12%	1,469											
DUP	Joe Miller*	12.70%	1,157											
DUP	Bill Irwin	8.15%	743	916.8	925.63	928.63	942.74	948.64	980.25	987.26	1,004.24	1,216.24		
UUP	John Adams*	9.11%	830	862.78	863.44	866.44	916.89	952.87	975.44	1,000.88	1,110.91	1,154.91		
Ind. Unionist	James Guy*	6.77%	617	643.18	643.69	652.69	659.91	668.35	677.15	776.18	792.64	813.13	838.33	1,190.33
SDLP	Gerald Toland*	9.54%	869	869.44	869.44	897.44	898.44	898.44	899.44	952.67	953.67	953.67	953.67	965.78
SDLP	Wilfred White	9.25%	843	843.66	843.66	856.66	859.66	860.66	860.66	887.66	888.66	888.66	888.66	893.41
Sinn Féin	Gary Fleming	8.56%	780	780.22	780.22	788.22	789.44	789.44	789.44	790.44	791.66	791.66	791.66	793.49
UUP	Derry Burgess	4.33%	395	413.26	413.54	422.76	426.98	463.76	474.01	499.02	671.83	720.47	770.27	
Ulster Democratic	James Millar	2.61%	238	255.16	255.32	256.32	268.34	271.78	429.46	430.46	444.22			
UUP	Jacqueline Colhoun	2.35%	214	229.84	230.06	232.06	236.51	343.4	350.74	363.96				
Alliance	Snoo Sinclair	2.78%	253	253.88	253.95	286.95	289.95	289.95	292.95					
Ulster Democratic	Kenneth Kerr*	2.54%	231	248.6	248.98	253.98	270.98	270.99						
UUP	William Houston	2.12%	193	200.92	201.01	203.01	206.01							
Independent	David Nicholl	1.55%	141	145.4	145.45	148.45								
Independent Labour	William Anderson	1.53%	139	139.44	139.44									
Electorate: 14,760 Valid: 9,112 (61.73%) Spoilt: 226 Quota: 1,140 Turnout: 9,338 (63.27%)
