= 1989 Derry City Council election =

Local govt election in Northern Ireland

- 17 May 1989

All 30 seats to Derry City Council 16 seats needed for a majority
	First party	Second party	Third party
Party	SDLP	Sinn Féin	DUP
Seats won	15	5	4
Seat change	▲1	0	▼1
	Fourth party	Fifth party	Sixth party
Party	UUP	Ind. Unionist	Ulster Democratic
Seats won	3	2	1
Seat change	▼2	▲2	▲1
	Seventh party
Party	Irish Independence
Seats won	0
Seat change	▼1

Elections to Derry City Council were held on 17 May 1989 on the same day as the other Northern Irish local government elections. The election used five district electoral areas to elect a total of 30 councillors.

== Election results ==
Derry City Council Election Result 1989
Party	Seats	Gains	Losses	Net gain/loss	Seats %	Votes %	Votes	+/−
SDLP	15	1	0	▲1	50.0	49.7	18,454	▲7.8
Sinn Féin	5	0	0	0	16.7	16.4	6,082	▼0.7
DUP	4	0	1	▼1	13.3	13.5	5,003	▼3.8
UUP	3	0	2	▼1	10.0	10.2	3,800	▼2.9
Ind. Unionist	2	2	0	▲2	6.7	3.7	1,390	▲3.7
Ulster Democratic	1	1	0	▲1	3.3	2.6	980	New
Ind. Nationalist	0	0	0	0	0.0	2.2	804	▲2.2
Alliance	0	0	0	0	0.0	0.6	238	▼2.1
Workers' Party	0	0	0	0	0.0	1.1	358	▲0.4

Note: "Votes" are the first preference votes.

== Districts summary ==
Results of the Derry City Council election, 1989 by district
Ward	%	Cllrs	%	Cllrs	%	Cllrs	%	Cllrs	%	Cllrs	%	Cllrs	Total Cllrs
Ward	SDLP		Sinn Féin		DUP		UUP		UDP		Others		Total Cllrs
Cityside	51.7	3	42.2	3	0.0	0	0.0	0	0.0	0	6.1	0	6
Northland	67.1	4	18.8	1	0.0	0	6.9	0	0.0	0	7.2	1	6
Rural	41.4	3	0.0	0	25.1	2	23.4	2	3.8	0	6.3	0	7
Shantallow	73.8	4	21.9	1	0.0	0	0.0	0	0.0	0	4.3	0	5
Waterside	19.7	1	8.1	0	36.0	2	15.0	1	8.3	1	12.9	1	6
Total	49.7	15	16.4	5	13.5	4	10.2	3	2.6	1	7.6	2	30

== District results ==
=== Cityside ===
1985: 3 x SDLP, 3 x Sinn Féin
1989: 3 x SDLP, 3 x Sinn Féin
1985-1989 Change: No change

Cityside - 6 seats
Party	Candidate	FPv%	Count			
Party	Candidate	FPv%	1	2	3	4
SDLP	Patrick Devine*	17.15%	1,011			
Sinn Féin	Hugh Brady*	15.22%	897			
SDLP	Tony Carlin*	12.45%	734	786.7	859.7	
Sinn Féin	Mitchel McLaughlin*	11.84%	698	699.02	855.02	
Sinn Féin	Anne McGuinness*	11.13%	656	660.25	777.42	821.34
SDLP	Jim Clifford	10.86%	640	706.13	802.89	805.17
SDLP	Pat Ramsey*	11.27%	664	693.58	766.96	767.14
Workers' Party	Eamonn Melaugh	6.07%	358	366.67		
Sinn Féin	Gerry Doherty	4.00%	236	236.85		
Electorate: 9,973 Valid: 5,894 (59.10%) Spoilt: 232 Quota: 843 Turnout: 6,126 (61.43%)

=== Northland ===
1985: 3 x SDLP, 1 x Sinn Féin, 1 x UUP, 1 x IIP
1989: 4 x SDLP, 1 x Sinn Féin, 1 x Independent Unionist
1985-1989 Change: SDLP gain from IIP, Independent Unionist leaves UUP

Northland - 6 seats
Party	Candidate	FPv%	Count					
Party	Candidate	FPv%	1	2	3	4	5	6
SDLP	John Tierney*	18.31%	1,565					
SDLP	Anna Gallagher*	15.08%	1,289					
SDLP	William McCorriston	13.20%	1,128	1,228.28				
Sinn Féin	Bernard McFadden*	13.84%	1,183	1,197.26	1,561.26			
SDLP	John Kerr	11.43%	977	1,054.51	1,065.81	1,113.81	1,127.81	1,133.81
Ind. Unionist	David Davis*	7.10%	607	622.18	629.1	651.1	654.2	1,128.48
SDLP	Leonard Green*	9.10%	778	889.78	898.7	917.7	960.05	972.05
UUP	Jack Allen	6.90%	590	591.15	593.15	593.15	593.25	
Sinn Féin	Martin Nelis	5.01%	428	437.89				
Electorate: 14,337 Valid: 8,545 (59.60%) Spoilt: 284 Quota: 1,221 Turnout: 8,829 (61.58%)

=== Rural ===
1985: 3 x SDLP, 2 x DUP, 2 x UUP
1989: 3 x SDLP, 2 x DUP, 2 x UUP
1985-1989 Change: No change

Rural - 7 seats
Party	Candidate	FPv%	Count								
Party	Candidate	FPv%	1	2	3	4	5	6	7	8	9
SDLP	Annie Courtney*	12.90%	1,117								
DUP	William Hay*	12.45%	1,078	1,159							
UUP	John Adams*	10.64%	922	995	1,007.22	1,007.34	1,116.34				
SDLP	John McNickle*	11.81%	1,023	1,027	1,027	1,034.98	1,034.98	1,034.98	1,288.98		
SDLP	George Peoples	10.92%	946	947	947	952.28	963.28	963.92	1,112.92		
DUP	Mervyn Lindsay	7.32%	634	668	712.18	712.21	755.15	757.71	758.77	758.77	1,164.77
UUP	Ernest Hamilton*	7.34%	636	675	678.76	678.88	966.91	995.07	996.28	1,000.28	1,020.28
Ind. Nationalist	Michael Breslin	6.28%	544	544	544.94	546.68	547.68	548	605.73	651.73	652.73
DUP	David Nicholl	5.32%	461	501	510.4	510.52	527.52	527.84	531.08	533.08	
SDLP	Robert Brolly	5.76%	499	499	500.88	516.99	516.99	516.99			
UUP	Margaret Parkhill	5.46%	473	484	485.88	486					
Ulster Democratic	Ernest Curry	3.80%	329								
Electorate: 13,344 Valid: 8,662 (64.91%) Spoilt: 211 Quota: 1,084 Turnout: 8,873 (66.49%)

=== Shantallow ===
1985: 4 x SDLP, 1 x Sinn Féin
1989: 4 x SDLP, 1 x Sinn Féin
1985-1989 Change: No change

Shantallow - 5 seats
Party	Candidate	FPv%	Count				
Party	Candidate	FPv%	1	2	3	4	5
SDLP	Mary Bradley*	24.47%	1,502				
SDLP	Noel McKenna*	19.60%	1,203				
SDLP	William O'Connell*	16.69%	1,024				
SDLP	Shaun Gallagher	13.08%	803	1,237.7			
Sinn Féin	Gearóid Ó hEára	12.37%	759	770.55	778.6	847.75	934.75
Sinn Féin	Richard Halpenny	9.55%	586	598.25	626.95	726.8	796.8
Ind. Nationalist	Thomas Mullan	4.24%	260	272.95	331.4		
Electorate: 10,573 Valid: 6,137 (58.04%) Spoilt: 228 Quota: 1,023 Turnout: 6,365 (60.20%)

=== Waterside ===
1985: 3 x DUP, 2 x UUP, 1 x SDLP
1989: 2 x DUP, 1 x UUP, 1 x SDLP, 1 x UDP, 1 x Independent Unionist
1985-1989 Change: UDP gain from DUP, Independent Unionist leaves UUP

Waterside - 6 seats
Party	Candidate	FPv%	Count									
Party	Candidate	FPv%	1	2	3	4	5	6	7	8	9	10
DUP	Gregory Campbell*	22.07%	1,737									
UUP	George Duddy*	5.70%	449	500.45	511.15	519.5	656.5	1,153.45				
DUP	Joe Miller	9.88%	778	875.65	881.35	900.75	925.25	945.15	949.74	949.74	1,245.74	
Ind. Unionist	James Guy*	9.95%	783	815.9	913.95	922.3	966.15	1,002.45	1,014.6	1,033	1,112.42	1,155.89
SDLP	Gerald Toland	10.41%	819	819	862	863	863	863	863	1,034.62	1,034.62	1,034.62
Ulster Democratic	Kenneth Kerr	4.94%	389	429.95	433.95	656.8	674.9	687.3	687.84	687.84	810	885.9
SDLP	Wilfred White	9.30%	732	732	753	753	753	754	754	791	791	791
DUP	Robert Hall	4.00%	315	594.65	602	610.4	619.9	636.15	646.68	646.68		
Sinn Féin	John Carlin	8.12%	639	639.35	642.35	642.35	642.35	644.75	645.02			
UUP	Gladys Carey	4.61%	363	422.15	432.85	436.2	602.4					
UUP	Albert McCartney	4.66%	367	391.5	404.85	407.2						
Ulster Democratic	Ronnie O'Brien	3.33%	262	270.4	276.75							
Alliance	Snoo Sinclair	3.02%	238	243.6								
Electorate: 12,405 Valid: 7,871 (63.45%) Spoilt: 159 Quota: 1,125 Turnout: 8,030 (64.73%)
