= Colum Eastwood =

Irish SDLP politician (born 1983)

Colum Eastwood MP
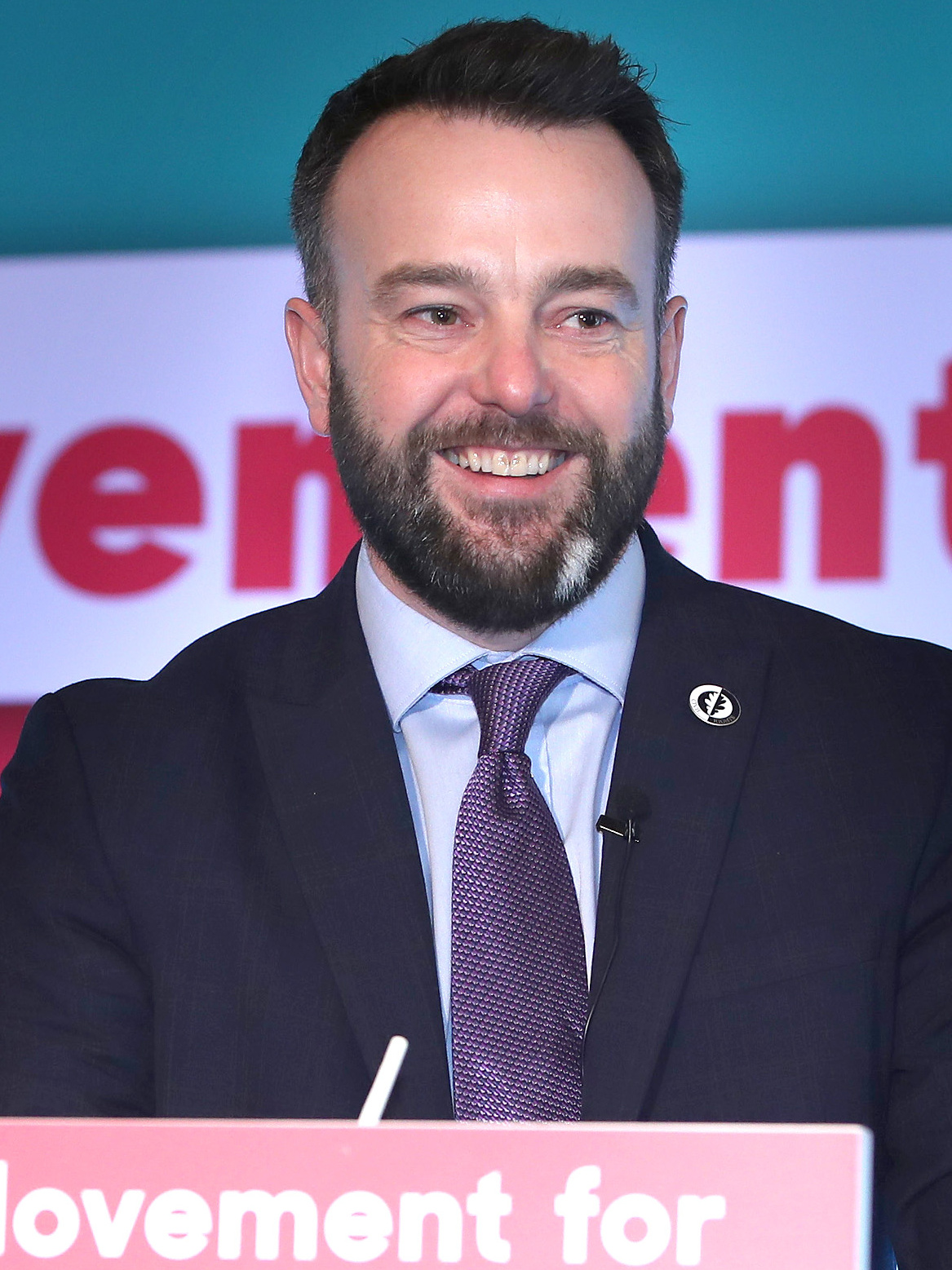
- Eastwood in 2023

Leader of the Social Democratic and Labour Party
- In office 14 November 2015 – 5 October 2024
- Deputy: Fearghal McKinney; Nichola Mallon
- Preceded by: Alasdair McDonnell
- Succeeded by: Claire Hanna

Member of Parliament for Foyle
- Incumbent
- Assumed office 12 December 2019
- Preceded by: Elisha McCallion
- Majority: 4,166 (10.9%)

Member of the Legislative Assembly for Foyle
- In office 5 May 2011 – 12 December 2019
- Preceded by: Pól Callaghan
- Succeeded by: Sinead McLaughlin

Mayor of Derry
- In office June 2010 – June 2011
- Preceded by: Paul Fleming
- Succeeded by: Maurice Devenney

Member of Derry City Council
- In office 5 May 2005 – 22 May 2014
- Preceded by: William O'Connell
- Succeeded by: Council abolished
- Constituency: Shantallow

Personal details
- Born: 30 April 1983 (age 43) Derry, Northern Ireland
- Party: Social Democratic and Labour Party
- Spouse: Rachael Eastwood (m. 2013; sep. 2022)
- Domestic partner: Louise Haigh (since 2025)
- Children: 2

Colum Eastwood (born 30 April 1983) is an Irish nationalist politician who served as Leader of the Social Democratic and Labour Party (SDLP) from 2015 to 2024. He has served as the Member of Parliament (MP) for Foyle since 2019, served in the Northern Ireland Assembly from 2011 to 2019 and served on Derry City Council from 2005 to 2011.

Eastwood was first elected to the Northern Ireland Assembly in 2011 and was re-elected in 2016 and 2017. He was also the SDLP candidate at the 2019 European Parliament election to represent Northern Ireland. In December 2019 he was elected to the British House of Commons as the Member of Parliament (MP) for Foyle.

== Early life ==
Eastwood was born in Derry, where he was educated at St John's Primary School (Creggan) and at St Columb's College. He later attended the University of Liverpool, where he studied Latin American Studies though he did not finish his degree.

== Political career ==
Eastwood joined the SDLP in 1998 at age 14 to campaign for the Good Friday Agreement. He "was drawn to the party by Hume, Seamus Mallon and the other political giants of that time that fundamentally changed politics across the island."

He was elected to Derry City Council in 2005 aged 22, and elected for a one-year term as Mayor of Derry in June 2010. Aged 27, he was the youngest mayor of the city to date.

=== Election to the Northern Ireland Assembly ===
Following his election to the Northern Ireland Assembly in May 2011, Eastwood was appointed SDLP representative on the committee of the Office of the First Minister and deputy First Minister. He sat on the Northern Ireland Assembly committees on Standards and Privileges, and the Environment and was appointed to the post of Assembly Private Secretary to the Minister of the Environment Alex Attwood in 2010.

2011 Assembly election: Foyle – 6 Seats
Party	Candidate	FPv%	Count						
Party	Candidate	FPv%	1	2	3	4	5	6	7
DUP	William Hay	18.4	7,154						
Sinn Féin	Martina Anderson	17.9	6,950						
SDLP	Mark H. Durkan	12.8	4,970	5,832	5,484	5,794			
Sinn Féin	Raymond McCartney	9.4	3,638	3,642	3,904	4,044	4,102	4,116	6,245
SDLP	Colum Eastwood	7.6	2,967	3,069	3,101	3,403	5,377	5,501	5,563
SDLP	Pat Ramsey	8.1	3,138	3,683	3,717	4,089	4,554	4,626	4,876
People Before Profit	Eamonn McCann	8.0	3,120	3,209	3,255	3,587	3,698	3,720	3,916
Sinn Féin	Paul Fleming	6.7	2,612	2,616	3,434	3,503	3,607	3,615	
SDLP	Pól Callaghan	6.8	2,624	2,691	2,730	2,891			
Independent	Paul McFadden	3.3	1,280	1,336	1,353				
Alliance	Keith McGrellis	0.9	334	621	621				
Independent	Terry Doherty	0.2	60	79	82				
Electorate: 68,663 Valid: 38,847 Spoilt: 839 (2.11) Quota: 5,550 Turnout: 57.80

In 2012 he drew criticism from Unionists including Jim Allister after carrying the coffin at the paramilitary funeral of a former Irish National Liberation Army member in Derry. A masked Real Irish Republican Army gunman fired a volley of shots over the coffin, although Eastwood stated he was not present at the time of the gunfire. He defended his attendance at the funeral saying the deceased was a personal friend and added "I wasn't concerned at the time about who was standing beside me, or about what flag or otherwise was draped over the coffin." It later emerged that party colleague Mark H. Durkan also attended the funeral.

On 14 November 2015, Eastwood contested the leadership election held at the SDLP's annual conference. He beat the incumbent, Alasdair McDonnell, by 172 votes to 133. Eastwood was re-elected to the NI Assembly in 2016 and 2017, receiving 5,000 and 7,240 first preference votes, respectively.

2016

2016 Assembly election: Foyle - 6 seats
Party	Candidate	FPv%	Count							
Party	Candidate	FPv%	1	2	3	4	5	6	7	8
DUP	Gary Middleton	11.9	4,737	4,770	4,772	6,641				
Sinn Féin	Raymond McCartney	8.1	3,198	3,220	3,270	3,271	3,274	5,676		
SDLP	Mark H. Durkan	10.6	4,197	4,268	4,395	4,527	4,744	4,801	6,905	
SDLP	Colum Eastwood	12.6	5,000	5,069	5,111	5,217	5,376	5,401	5,804	
Sinn Féin	Martin McGuinness	12.7	5,037	5,070	5,168	5,175	5,176	5,656	5,712	
People Before Profit	Eamonn McCann	10.5	4,176	4,354	4,551	4,635	4,720	4,779	4,927	5,394
Independent	Dr. Anne McCloskey	8.6	3,410	3,484	3,683	3,754	3,832	3,886	3,974	4,227
SDLP	Gerard Diver	6.8	2,700	2,743	2,797	2,974	3,239	3,249		
Sinn Féin	Maeve McLaughlin	7.7	3,062	3,072	3,114	3,114	3,114			
UUP	Julia Kee	3.6	1,420	1,477	1,484					
Independent	Maurice Devenney	3.0	1,173	1,190	1,213					
Independent	Kathleen Bradley	2.3	902	928						
CISTA	John Lindsay	0.7	259							
Alliance	Chris McCaw	0.6	238							
Green (NI)	Mary Hassan	0.4	157							
NI Conservatives	Alan Dunlop	0.1	36							
Electorate: 71,759 Valid: 39,702 Spoilt: 485 (1.21%) Quota: 5,672 Turnout: 58.00%

2017

2017 Assembly election: Foyle - 5 seats
Party	Candidate	FPv%	Count					
Party	Candidate	FPv%	1	2	3	4	5	6
Sinn Féin	Elisha McCallion	20.6	9,205					
Sinn Féin	Raymond McCartney	16.0	7,145	8,608.76				
SDLP	Colum Eastwood	16.2	7,240	7,332.53	7,595.30			
SDLP	Mark H. Durkan	15.6	6,948	7,023.05	7,275.56	7,380.68	8,413.68	
DUP	Gary Middleton	13.4	5,975	5,975	5,976.71	6,008.09	6,902.37	7,036.37
People Before Profit	Eamonn McCann	10.7	4,760	4,850.63	5,086.80	5,291.63	5,922.16	6,373.16
UUP	Julia Kee	3.7	1,660	1,661.52	1,668.93	1,704.50		
Alliance	Colm Cavanagh	2.5	1,124	1,132.93	1,179.67	1,295.22		
Green (NI)	Shannon Downey	0.5	242	244.09	264.42			
CISTA	John Lindsay	0.4	196	199.61	225.45			
NI Conservatives	Stuart Canning	0.2	77	77.19	78.90			
Independent	Arthur McGuinness	0.1	44	44.57	56.35			
Electorate: 69,718 Valid: 44,616 Spoilt: 701 (1.55%) Quota: 7,437 Turnout: 65.00% (45,317)

=== Election to the House of Commons ===
On 12 December 2019 Eastwood was elected as Member of the Parliament of the United Kingdom for Foyle in a landslide victory against Sinn Féin candidate, then incumbent, Elisha McCallion. He was the first of the new MPs elected at the 2019 general election to make his maiden speech in the Commons.

On 11 November 2020 during a Westminster Hall debate Eastwood called for a full and independent judicial inquiry into the murder of Belfast solicitor Pat Finucane in 1989.

He was re-elected MP in 2024 following the general election. That year, he described the Oath of Allegiance to King Charles III as an "empty formula" and said he took it "under protest" in order to represent his constituents in the House of Commons.

=== Leader of the Social Democratic and Labour Party (SDLP) ===
Following the SDLP's poor election results in the 2014 local elections, the 2014 European Parliament election and the 2015 Westminster election, the then SDLP leader and MP for South Belfast Alasdair McDonnell resisted calls to stand down, including from the party's deputy leader Dolores Kelly.

At the SDLP's Annual Conference on 14 November 2015, Eastwood contested the leadership election where he defeated the incumbent, Alasdair McDonnell, by 172 votes to 133.

In July 2021 Eastwood used parliamentary privilege to reveal the identity of Bloody Sunday's 'Soldier F' in the House of Commons.

In August 2024, Eastwood announced his intention to resign as leader, and was succeeded by Claire Hanna at the SDLP Conference on 5 October 2024.

Eastwood revealed in June 2025 that he was considering a candidacy in the 2025 Irish presidential election.

== Personal life ==
Eastwood married Rachael Parkes in December 2013. They have two daughters. The couple separated in 2022. In August 2025, Eastwood publicly confirmed his relationship with Labour MP Louise Haigh. Haigh was appointed First Secretary of State, Chancellor of the Duchy of Lancaster and Minister for the Cabinet Office in July 2026. Following her appointment, The Irish Times described Haigh as "the most powerful woman in Britain" and identified her relationship with Eastwood as one of her principal Irish connections. The Irish News subsequently noted that, through the relationship, Eastwood was "close to the new prime minister by association".

Civic offices
Preceded by Paul Fleming	Mayor of Derry; 2010 to 2011	Succeeded by Maurice Devenney
Party political offices
Preceded by Alasdair McDonnell	Leader of the SDLP; 2015 to 2024	Succeeded by Claire Hanna
Parliament of the United Kingdom
Preceded by Elisha McCallion	Member of Parliament for Foyle; 2019 to present	Incumbent
Northern Ireland Assembly
Preceded by Pól Callaghan	MLA for Foyle; 2011 to 2020	Succeeded by Sinead McLaughlin
