= 1997 Derry City Council election =

Local govt election in Northern Ireland

- 21 May 1997

All 30 seats to Derry City Council 16 seats needed for a majority
	First party	Second party	Third party
Party	SDLP	Sinn Féin	DUP
Seats won	14	8	4
Seat change	▼3	▲3	▼1
	Fourth party	Fifth party
Party	UUP	Ind. Unionist
Seats won	3	1
Seat change	▲1	0
- Results by district electoral area, shaded by First Preference Votes.

Elections to Derry City Council were held on 21 May 1997 on the same day as the other Northern Irish local government elections. The election used five district electoral areas to elect a total of 30 councillors.

== Election results ==
Derry City Council Election Result 1997
Party	Seats	Gains	Losses	Net gain/loss	Seats %	Votes %	Votes	+/−
SDLP	14	0	3	▼3	46.7	43.7	18,012	▼3.2
Sinn Féin	8	3	0	▲3	26.7	27.7	11,394	▲7.5
DUP	4	0	1	▼1	13.3	12.6	5,186	▼0.7
UUP	3	1	0	▲1	10.0	8.7	3,595	▼0.5
Ind. Unionist	1	0	0	0	3.3	2.8	1,203	▲0.1
NI Women's Coalition	0	0	0	0	0.0	2.5	1,036	New
Labour Coalition	0	0	0	0	0.0	1.1	434	New
Ulster Democratic	0	0	0	0	0.0	0.7	176	▼0.5
Independent	0	0	0	0	0.0	0.1	48	▼1.9
Ind. Nationalist	0	0	0	0	0.0	0.1	22	▲0.1

Note: "Votes" are the first preference votes.

== Districts summary ==
Results of the Derry City Council election, 1997 by district
Ward	%	Cllrs	%	Cllrs	%	Cllrs	%	Cllrs	%	Cllrs	Total Cllrs
Ward	SDLP		Sinn Féin		DUP		UUP		Others		Total Cllrs
Cityside	40.6	2	55.5	3	0.0	0	0.0	0	3.9	0	5
Northland	57.2	5	33.4	2	0.0	0	0.0	0	9.4	0	7
Rural	44.5	3	9.0	0	23.6	1	20.0	1	2.9	0	6
Shantallow	56.4	3	36.7	2	1.7	0	0.0	0	5.2	0	5
Waterside	19.8	1	9.9	1	35.0	3	22.2	1	13.1	1	7
Total	43.7	14	27.7	8	12.6	4	8.7	3	7.3	1	30

== District results ==
=== Cityside ===
1993: 3 x SDLP, 2 x Sinn Féin
1997: 3 x Sinn Féin, 2 x SDLP
1993-1997 Change: Sinn Féin gain from SDLP

Cityside - 5 seats
Party	Candidate	FPv%	Count					
Party	Candidate	FPv%	1	2	3	4	5	6
Sinn Féin	Cathal Crumley	20.61%	1,333					
Sinn Féin	Mitchel McLaughlin*	20.21%	1,307					
Sinn Féin	Peter Anderson	14.72%	952	979	1,213.27			
SDLP	Jim Clifford*	14.98%	969	1,042	1,047.7	1,115.64		
SDLP	Pat Ramsey*	12.71%	822	883	884.33	972.81	976.8	989.55
SDLP	Patrick Devine*	12.82%	829	881	884.42	955.52	961.41	986.16
NI Women's Coalition	Margaret Logue	3.94%	255					
Electorate: 9,432 Valid: 6,467 (68.56%) Spoilt: 194 Quota: 1,078 Turnout: 6,661 (70.62%)

=== Northland ===
1993: 5 x SDLP, 2 x Sinn Féin
1997: 5 x SDLP, 2 x Sinn Féin
1993-1997 Change: No change

Northland - 7 seats
Party	Candidate	FPv%	Count						
Party	Candidate	FPv%	1	2	3	4	5	6	7
SDLP	Mark Durkan*	17.17%	1,679						
Sinn Féin	Mary Nelis*	16.00%	1,564						
SDLP	Martin Bradley*	11.41%	1,115	1,272.14					
Sinn Féin	Marion Hutcheon	11.54%	1,128	1,134.75	1,318.67				
SDLP	John Tierney*	11.21%	1,096	1,147.03	1,161.99	1,163.42	1,172.06	1,246.06	
SDLP	John Kerr*	8.69%	850	1,012	1,018.82	1,019.59	1,045.75	1,132.75	1,252.1
SDLP	Kathleen McCloskey*	8.74%	854	896.39	901.67	902.44	910.04	968.04	1,040.04
Sinn Féin	Pius McNaught	5.85%	572	577.94	691.24	779.35	780.23	822.23	827.23
Ind. Unionist	Alexander Simpson	5.44%	532	533.89	533.89	533.89	533.89	567.89	
NI Women's Coalition	Patricia McAdams	2.97%	290	303.23	308.51	309.06	310.5		
Labour Coalition	Anthony Martin	0.51%	50	52.97	54.51	54.62	54.94		
Labour Coalition	Geraldine O'Neill	0.47%	46	48.7	50.24	50.46	50.7		
Electorate: 16,075 Valid: 9,776 (60.81%) Spoilt: 207 Quota: 1,223 Turnout: 9,983 (62.10%)

=== Rural ===
1993: 3 x SDLP, 2 x DUP, 1 x UUP
1997: 3 x SDLP, 2 x UUP, 1 x DUP
1993-1997 Change: UUP gain from DUP

Rural - 6 seats
Party	Candidate	FPv%	Count						
Party	Candidate	FPv%	1	2	3	4	5	6	7
SDLP	Annie Courtney*	15.59%	1,220						
DUP	William Hay*	14.12%	1,105	1,121					
SDLP	John McNickle*	12.47%	976	991	1,421				
SDLP	George Peoples*	9.44%	739	760	871	1,168.84			
UUP	Andrew Davidson	10.64%	833	887	890	890	901.31	905.87	1,212.87
UUP	Ernest Hamilton	9.33%	730	751	751	751	754.19	757.23	1,048.15
Sinn Féin	Paul Fleming	9.03%	707	719	748	749.46	833.56	874.6	874.6
DUP	Maurice Devenney	9.47%	741	749	749	749	750.74	751.5	
SDLP	Jim McKeever	7.01%	549	600					
NI Women's Coalition	Catherine Cooke	2.30%	180						
Independent	David Hawthorne	0.61%	48						
Electorate: 13,468 Valid: 7,828 (58.12%) Spoilt: 164 Quota: 1,119 Turnout: 7,992 (59.34%)

=== Shantallow ===
1993: 4 x SDLP, 1 x Sinn Féin
1997: 3 x SDLP, 2 x Sinn Féin
1993-1997 Change: Sinn Féin gain from SDLP

Shantallow - 5 seats
Party	Candidate	FPv%	Count						
Party	Candidate	FPv%	1	2	3	4	5	6	7
SDLP	Mary Bradley*	22.87%	1,826						
Sinn Féin	Tony Hassan	16.16%	1,290	1,304.84	1,306.84	1,307.84	1,325.68	1,658.68	
Sinn Féin	Gearóid Ó hEára*	14.21%	1,134	1,154.44	1,157.44	1,157.44	1,199.66	1,333.56	
SDLP	Shaun Gallagher*	10.92%	872	1,190.92	1,202.2	1,221.88	1,298.64	1,311.2	1,325.2
SDLP	William O'Connell*	12.86%	1,027	1,088.32	1,091.32	1,104.32	1,171.56	1,181.96	1,187.96
SDLP	Margaret McCartney*	9.76%	779	833.6	841.88	869.16	989.96	1,000.8	1,011.8
Sinn Féin	Bernadette McDaid	6.31%	504	508.2	509.32	509.32	522.88		
Labour Coalition	Charles McDaid	2.44%	195	197.8	222.8	232.8			
NI Women's Coalition	Diane Greer	2.07%	165	177.04	179.32	204.32			
DUP	William Dougherty	1.68%	134	136.24	137.24				
Labour Coalition	Robert Lindsay	0.51%	41	43.24					
Labour Coalition	Patrick Muldowney	0.20%	16	16.56					
Electorate: 13,598 Valid: 7,983 (58.71%) Spoilt: 188 Quota: 1,331 Turnout: 8,171 (60.09%)

=== Waterside ===
1993: 3 x DUP, 2 x SDLP, 1 x UUP, 1 x Independent Unionist
1997: 3 x DUP, 1 x SDLP, 1 x UUP, 1 x Sinn Féin, 1 x Independent Unionist
1993-1997 Change: Sinn Féin gain from SDLP

Waterside - 7 seats
Party	Candidate	FPv%	Count							
Party	Candidate	FPv%	1	2	3	4	5	6	7	8
UUP	Richard Dallas*	16.77%	1,535							
DUP	Gregory Campbell*	16.36%	1,497							
SDLP	Philip Kelly	11.48%	1,051	1,051.25	1,051.73	1,124.73	1,127.73	1,128.21	1,815.21	
Sinn Féin	Lynn Fleming	9.87%	903	903.25	904.21	925.21	925.21	926.45	967.45	1,120.45
DUP	Joe Miller*	8.18%	749	789.75	851.91	862.13	946.17	1,098.86	1,100.86	1,106.86
Ind. Unionist	James Guy*	7.33%	671	717.25	762.37	815.35	850.26	877.66	905.66	1,082.66
DUP	Mildred Garfield	5.65%	517	544.5	680.1	691.54	736.97	1,056.75	1,060.75	1,061.75
UUP	Mary Hamilton	5.43%	497	722	757.04	770.03	821.72	850.56	850.56	850.56
SDLP	Wilfred White*	8.29%	759	759	759	795	798	799		
DUP	Bill Irwin*	4.84%	443	464.5	517.06	519.06	560.99			
Ulster Democratic	David Nicholl	3.02%	276	290	304.88	318.87				
NI Women's Coalition	Helena Schlindwein	1.60%	146	146.5	147.22					
Labour Coalition	Kenneth Adams	0.94%	86	89.75	93.11					
Ind. Nationalist	Gerald Toland*	0.24%	22	22	22					
Electorate: 15,408 Valid: 9,152 (59.40%) Spoilt: 186 Quota: 1,145 Turnout: 9,338 (60.60%)
