= Rural (District Electoral Area) =

District electoral areas in Derry, Northern Ireland

Rural DEA (1993-2014) within Derry

Rural was one of the five district electoral areas in Derry, Northern Ireland which existed from 1985 to 2014. The district elected seven members to Derry City Council until 1993, and six members until 2014, and formed part of the Foyle constituencies for the Northern Ireland Assembly and UK Parliament.

It was created for the 1985 local elections, replacing Londonderry Area A which had existed since 1973, and contained the wards of Banagher, Claudy, Corrody, Eglinton, Enagh, Faughan and New Buildings. For the 1993 local elections it was reduced by one ward, losing Corrody and Faughan but gaining Holly Mount. It was abolished for the 2014 local elections and replaced with the Faughan DEA.

== Councillors ==
Election	Councillor (party)	Councillor (party)	Councillor (party)	Councillor (party)	Councillor (party)	Councillor (party)	Councillor (party)
2011	Paul Fleming (Sinn Féin)	Thomas Conway (SDLP)	Gus Hastings (SDLP)	Brenda Stevenson (SDLP)	Maurice Devenney (DUP)	Gary Middleton (DUP)	6 seats 1985–1993
2005	Paul Fleming (Sinn Féin)	Thomas Conway (SDLP)	Jim McKeever (SDLP)	Liam Boyle (SDLP)	Maurice Devenney (DUP)	William Hay (DUP)	6 seats 1985–1993
2001	Paul Fleming (Sinn Féin)	Thomas Conway (SDLP)	Jim McKeever (SDLP)	Annie Courtney (SDLP)	Andrew Davidson (UUP)	William Hay (DUP)	6 seats 1985–1993
1997	Ernest Hamilton (UUP)	John McNickle (SDLP)	George Peoples (SDLP)	Annie Courtney (SDLP)	Andrew Davidson (UUP)	William Hay (DUP)	6 seats 1985–1993
1993	Richard Dallas (UUP)	John McNickle (SDLP)	George Peoples (SDLP)	Annie Courtney (SDLP)	Mervyn Lindsay (DUP)	William Hay (DUP)	6 seats 1985–1993
1989	Ernest Hamilton (UUP)	John McNickle (SDLP)	George Peoples (SDLP)	Annie Courtney (SDLP)	Mervyn Lindsay (DUP)	William Hay (DUP)	John Adams (UUP)
1985	Ernest Hamilton (UUP)	John McNickle (SDLP)	Hugh O'Neill (SDLP)	Annie Courtney (SDLP)	Ellis Allen (DUP)	William Hay (DUP)	John Adams (UUP)

== 2011 election ==
2005: 3 x SDLP, 2 x DUP, 1 x Sinn Féin

2011: 3 x SDLP, 2 x DUP, 1 x Sinn Féin

2005-2011 change: No change

Rural - 6 seats
Party	Candidate	FPv%	Count								
Party	Candidate	FPv%	1	2	3	4	5	6	7	8	9
Sinn Féin	Paul Fleming*	18.39%	1,693								
SDLP	Thomas Conway*	17.55%	1,616								
DUP	Maurice Devenney*	15.56%	1,433								
DUP	Gary Middleton	13.24%	1,219	1,221.07	1,224.3	1,224.3	1,227.3	1,732.3			
SDLP	Brenda Stevenson	6.68%	615	628.34	685.34	709.76	1,110.67	1,179.23	1,285.23	1,352.19	
SDLP	Gus Hastings	6.78%	624	652.98	771.16	827.44	889.84	920.22	975.22	1,022.03	1,049.31
Sinn Féin	Catherine Nelis	6.85%	631	938.51	972.33	1,009.51	1,039.17	1,040.36	1,042.36	1,045.15	1,047.01
UUP	Ronald McKeegan	7.58%	698	698.46	702.83	725.83	730.83				
SDLP	Ashleen Schenning	4.59%	423	432.43	498.93	544.29					
People Before Profit	Diane Greer	2.78%	256	262.44	267.76						
Electorate: 16,892 Valid: 9,208 (54.51%) Spoilt: 202 Quota: 1,316 Turnout: 9,410 (55.71%)

== 2005 election ==
2001: 3 x SDLP, 1 x DUP, 1 x Sinn Féin, 1 x UUP

2005: 3 x SDLP, 2 x DUP, 1 x Sinn Féin

2001-2005 change: DUP gain from UUP

Rural - 6 seats
Party	Candidate	FPv%	Count								
Party	Candidate	FPv%	1	2	3	4	5	6	7	8	9
DUP	William Hay*	14.70%	1,413								
SDLP	Thomas Conway*	14.24%	1,368	1,368.12	1,443.12						
SDLP	Liam Boyle	10.56%	1,015	1,015.06	1,089.1	1,133.74	1,237.67	1,371.6	1,382.6		
Sinn Féin	Paul Fleming*	11.83%	1,137	1,137.02	1,157.04	1,159.83	1,172.83	1,232.85	1,232.85	1,772.85	
DUP	Maurice Devenney	13.27%	1,275	1,296.16	1,302.2	1,302.2	1,304.24	1,313.26	1,363.22	1,366.24	1,366.24
SDLP	Jim McKeever*	7.02%	675	675.12	715.12	717.91	948.79	1,051.76	1,082.8	1,141.83	1,266.15
UUP	Ernest Hamilton	5.55%	533	536.5	560.54	560.54	565.56	573.6	940.48	942.48	943.22
Sinn Féin	Thomas McGlinchey	6.48%	623	623.02	635.02	638.74	652.67	679.55	679.55		
UUP	William Storey	4.68%	450	451.94	467.98	467.98	474.98	488.04			
Socialist Environmental	Eamonn McCann	3.86%	371	371.18	415.22	418.94	430.89				
SDLP	Thomas Harty	3.96%	381	381.12	401.12	407.63					
Independent	Annie Courtney*	3.84%	369	369.24							
Electorate: 14,966 Valid: 9,610 (64.21%) Spoilt: 207 Quota: 1,373 Turnout: 9,817 (65.60%)

== 2001 election ==
1997: 3 x SDLP, 2 x UUP, 1 x DUP

2001: 3 x SDLP, 1 x UUP, 1 x DUP, 1 x Sinn Féin

1997-2001 change: Sinn Féin gain from UUP

Rural - 6 seats
Party	Candidate	FPv%	Count									
Party	Candidate	FPv%	1	2	3	4	5	6	7	8	9	10
DUP	William Hay*	15.37%	1,511									
SDLP	Annie Courtney*	14.69%	1,444									
SDLP	Thomas Conway	12.96%	1,274	1,304	1,304	1,550						
UUP	Andrew Davidson*	10.93%	1,074	1,131	1,138.07	1,141.07	1,143.11	1,552.11				
Sinn Féin	Paul Fleming	9.59%	943	955	955	985	994.52	995.52	1,574.6			
SDLP	Jim McKeever*	8.10%	796	822	822.07	981.07	1,100.75	1,106.75	1,156.43	1,266.33	1,234.33	1,268.68
DUP	Bill Irwin	8.94%	879	883	968.61	970.61	970.61	1,086.89	1,086.89	1,087.19	1,224.19	1,224.37
Sinn Féin	James Kelly	6.89%	677	682	682	698	710.24	711.24				
UUP	Ernest Hamilton*	5.64%	554	560	569.66	572.66	572.66					
SDLP	Brenda Stevenson	5.20%	511	519	519							
Alliance	Brian Kelly	1.69%	166									
Electorate: 14,567 Valid: 9,829 (67.47%) Spoilt: 222 Quota: 1,405 Turnout: 10,051 (69.00%)

== 1997 election ==
1993: 3 x SDLP, 2 x DUP, 1 x UUP

1997: 3 x SDLP, 2 x UUP, 1 x DUP

1993-1997 change: UUP gain from DUP

Rural - 6 seats
Party	Candidate	FPv%	Count						
Party	Candidate	FPv%	1	2	3	4	5	6	7
SDLP	Annie Courtney*	15.59%	1,220						
DUP	William Hay*	14.12%	1,105	1,121					
SDLP	John McNickle*	12.47%	976	991	1,421				
SDLP	George Peoples*	9.44%	739	760	871	1,168.84			
UUP	Andrew Davidson	10.64%	833	887	890	890	901.31	905.87	1,212.87
UUP	Ernest Hamilton	9.33%	730	751	751	751	754.19	757.23	1,048.15
Sinn Féin	Paul Fleming	9.03%	707	719	748	749.46	833.56	874.6	874.6
DUP	Maurice Devenney	9.47%	741	749	749	749	750.74	751.5	
SDLP	Jim McKeever	7.01%	549	600					
NI Women's Coalition	Catherine Cooke	2.30%	180						
Independent	David Hawthorne	0.61%	48						
Electorate: 13,468 Valid: 7,828 (58.12%) Spoilt: 164 Quota: 1,119 Turnout: 7,992 (59.34%)

== 1993 election ==
1989: 3 x SDLP, 2 x DUP, 2 x UUP

1993: 3 x SDLP, 2 x DUP, 1 x UUP

1989-1993 change: UUP loss due to the reduction of one seat

Rural - 6 seats
Party	Candidate	FPv%	Count							
Party	Candidate	FPv%	1	2	3	4	5	6	7	8
SDLP	Annie Courtney*	20.53%	1,545							
SDLP	John McNickle*	13.94%	1,049	1,310.76						
SDLP	George Peoples*	11.22%	844	932.96	974.72	975.72	1,091.72			
UUP	Richard Dallas	10.50%	790	797.68	797.68	935.32	937.32	937.86	1,444.86	
DUP	William Hay*	11.71%	881	885.48	886.35	911.67	912.67	912.94	983.26	1,156.26
DUP	Mervyn Lindsay*	9.25%	696	696.32	696.32	706.64	707.64	707.64	818.64	984.64
SDLP	Patrick Murray	5.04%	379	451.32	637.21	637.53	771	785.58	785.9	786.9
UUP	Ernest Hamilton*	6.75%	508	510.24	510.24	706.24	707.24	707.24		
Sinn Féin	Bernard McFadden	5.98%	450	466	468.32	468.32				
UUP	George Duddy	5.09%	383	384.92	384.92					
Electorate: 12,377 Valid: 7,525 (60.80%) Spoilt: 200 Quota: 1,076 Turnout: 7,725 (62.41%)

== 1989 election ==
1985: 3 x SDLP, 2 x DUP, 2 x UUP

1989: 3 x SDLP, 2 x DUP, 2 x UUP

1985-1989 change: No change

Rural - 7 seats
Party	Candidate	FPv%	Count								
Party	Candidate	FPv%	1	2	3	4	5	6	7	8	9
SDLP	Annie Courtney*	12.90%	1,117								
DUP	William Hay*	12.45%	1,078	1,159							
UUP	John Adams*	10.64%	922	995	1,007.22	1,007.34	1,116.34				
SDLP	John McNickle*	11.81%	1,023	1,027	1,027	1,034.98	1,034.98	1,034.98	1,288.98		
SDLP	George Peoples	10.92%	946	947	947	952.28	963.28	963.92	1,112.92		
DUP	Mervyn Lindsay	7.32%	634	668	712.18	712.21	755.15	757.71	758.77	758.77	1,164.77
UUP	Ernest Hamilton*	7.34%	636	675	678.76	678.88	966.91	995.07	996.28	1,000.28	1,020.28
Ind. Nationalist	Michael Breslin	6.28%	544	544	544.94	546.68	547.68	548	605.73	651.73	652.73
DUP	David Nicholl	5.32%	461	501	510.4	510.52	527.52	527.84	531.08	533.08	
SDLP	Robert Brolly	5.76%	499	499	500.88	516.99	516.99	516.99			
UUP	Margaret Parkhill	5.46%	473	484	485.88	486					
Ulster Democratic	Ernest Curry	3.80%	329								
Electorate: 13,344 Valid: 8,662 (64.91%) Spoilt: 211 Quota: 1,084 Turnout: 8,873 (66.49%)

== 1985 election ==
1985: 3 x SDLP, 2 x DUP, 2 x UUP

Rural - 7 seats
Party	Candidate	FPv%	Count							
Party	Candidate	FPv%	1	2	3	4	5	6	7	8
SDLP	John McNickle*	11.54%	1,004	1,016	1,040	1,042	1,146			
DUP	William Hay*	11.58%	1,008	1,008	1,008	1,048	1,048	1,048	1,390	
DUP	Ellis Allen	9.32%	811	811	811	841	841	841	1,126	
UUP	John Adams	8.89%	774	774	775	1,045	1,048	1,048	1,076	1,174
UUP	Ernest Hamilton	7.88%	686	686	686	853	853	853	928	1,088
SDLP	Annie Courtney	11.09%	965	969	1,028	1,029	1,071	1,078.36	1,078.36	1,080.36
SDLP	Hugh O'Neill	8.02%	698	702	801	802	875	910.88	915.88	915.88
SDLP	George Peoples*	7.61%	662	667	685	688	744	758.72	759.72	759.72
DUP	Mervyn Lindsay	8.39%	730	731	731	742	742	742		
Sinn Féin	Edward McGowan	3.49%	304	516	565	565				
UUP	Robert Bond*	6.09%	530	530	532					
Irish Independence	Michael Breslin	3.17%	276	285						
Sinn Féin	Patrick McNaught	2.92%	254							
Electorate: 12,752 Valid: 8,702 (68.24%) Spoilt: 185 Quota: 1,088 Turnout: 8,887 (69.69%)
