= Shantallow (District Electoral Area) =

District electoral areas in Derry, Northern Ireland

Shantallow DEA (1993-2014) within Derry

Shantallow was one of the five district electoral areas in Derry, Northern Ireland which existed from 1985 to 2014. The district elected five members to Derry City Council, and formed part of the Foyle constituencies for the Northern Ireland Assembly and UK Parliament.

It was created for the 1985 local elections, replacing Londonderry Area E which had existed since 1973, and contained the wards of Ballynashallog, Carn Hill, Culmore, Shantallow East and Shantallow West. It was abolished for the 2014 local elections and replaced with the Ballyarnett DEA.

== Councillors ==
Election	Councillor (Party)	Councillor (Party)	Councillor (Party)	Councillor (Party)	Councillor (Party)
2011	Jimmy Carr (SDLP)	Shaun Gallagher (SDLP)	Colum Eastwood (SDLP)	Tony Hassan (Sinn Féin)	Elisha McCallion (Sinn Féin)
2005	Mary Bradley (SDLP)	Shaun Gallagher (SDLP)	Colum Eastwood (SDLP)	Tony Hassan (Sinn Féin)	Elisha McCallion (Sinn Féin)
2001	Mary Bradley (SDLP)	Shaun Gallagher (SDLP)	William O'Connell (SDLP)	Tony Hassan (Sinn Féin)	Gearóid Ó hEára (Sinn Féin)
1997	Mary Bradley (SDLP)	Shaun Gallagher (SDLP)	William O'Connell (SDLP)	Tony Hassan (Sinn Féin)	Gearóid Ó hEára (Sinn Féin)
1993	Mary Bradley (SDLP)	Shaun Gallagher (SDLP)	William O'Connell (SDLP)	Margaret McCartney (SDLP)	Gearóid Ó hEára (Sinn Féin)
1989	Mary Bradley (SDLP)	Shaun Gallagher (SDLP)	William O'Connell (SDLP)	Noel McKenna (SDLP)	Gearóid Ó hEára (Sinn Féin)
1985	Mary Bradley (SDLP)	Teresa Coyle (SDLP)	William O'Connell (SDLP)	Noel McKenna (SDLP)	Gerard Doherty (Sinn Féin)

== 2011 Election ==
2005: 3 x SDLP, 2 x Sinn Féin

2011: 3 x SDLP, 2 x Sinn Féin

2005-2011 Change: No change

Shantallow - 5 seats
Party	Candidate	FPv%	Count					
Party	Candidate	FPv%	1	2	3	4	5	6
SDLP	Colum Eastwood*	23.43%	2,109					
Sinn Féin	Tony Hassan*	15.61%	1,405	1,443.1	1,493.3	1,584.3		
SDLP	Shaun Gallagher*	12.79%	1,151	1,397	1,484.1	1,552.1		
SDLP	Jimmy Carr	8.51%	766	844.6	885.3	952.2	955.2	1,398.2
Sinn Féin	Elisha McLaughlin*	12.41%	1,117	1,140.1	1,179.7	1,253.6	1,288.6	1,307.6
Sinn Féin	Sandra Duffy	9.26%	833	848.3	871.3	893.3	911.3	943.3
SDLP	Angela Dobbins	6.70%	603	775.8	826.8	848.3	849.3	
Irish Republican Socialist	Martin McMonagle	5.99%	539	544.4	609.7			
Independent	Pauline Mellon	5.30%	477	493.5				
Electorate: 15,935 Valid: 9,000 (56.48%) Spoilt: 201 Quota: 1,501 Turnout: 9,201 (57.74%)

== 2005 Election ==
2001: 3 x SDLP, 2 x Sinn Féin

2005: 3 x SDLP, 2 x Sinn Féin

2001-2005 Change: No change

Shantallow - 5 seats
Party	Candidate	FPv%	Count					
Party	Candidate	FPv%	1	2	3	4	5	6
SDLP	Mary Bradley*	22.51%	2,180					
SDLP	Colum Eastwood	13.54%	1,311	1,588.42	1,630.42			
SDLP	Shaun Gallagher*	11.56%	1,119	1,273.7	1,357.32	1,924.32		
Sinn Féin	Tony Hassan*	9.55%	925	945.02	980.32	992.88	1,009.88	1,614.64
Sinn Féin	Elisha McLaughlin	13.05%	1,264	1,278.04	1,311.56	1,330.12	1,344.12	1,457.46
Sinn Féin	Gearóid Ó hEára*	11.56%	1,119	1,132.52	1,174.6	1,189.72	1,218.72	1,328.76
Sinn Féin	Oliver Green	8.24%	798	809.18	838.22	850.56	872.56	
SDLP	Helena Kearney	6.48%	627	666.52	703.08			
Independent	Tommy Mullan	3.51%	340	357.94				
Electorate: 15,060 Valid: 9,683 (64.30%) Spoilt: 227 Quota: 1,614 Turnout: 9,910 (65.80%)

== 2001 Election ==
1997: 3 x SDLP, 2 x Sinn Féin

2001: 3 x SDLP, 2 x Sinn Féin

1997-2001 Change: No change

Shantallow - 5 seats
Party	Candidate	FPv%	Count				
Party	Candidate	FPv%	1	2	3	4	5
SDLP	Mary Bradley*	22.53%	2,304				
SDLP	Shaun Gallagher*	12.58%	1,287	1,686.33	1,790.33		
Sinn Féin	Tony Hassan*	12.09%	1,237	1,262.65	1,336	2,242	
Sinn Féin	Gearóid Ó hEára*	12.10%	1,238	1,256.09	1,581.52	1,723.52	
SDLP	William O'Connell*	11.10%	1,135	1,225.45	1,324.58	1,342.63	1,402.63
SDLP	Ciaran O'Doherty	9.94%	1,017	1,048.86	1,249.29	1,264.83	1,285.83
Sinn Féin	Oliver Green	10.60%	1,084	1,096.42	1,131.23		
Independent	Charles McDaid	5.30%	542	549.56			
Sinn Féin	Jean McGinty	3.75%	384	390.48			
Electorate: 15,381 Valid: 10,228 (66.50%) Spoilt: 316 Quota: 1,705 Turnout: 10,544 (68.55%)

== 1997 Election ==
1993: 4 x SDLP, 1 x Sinn Féin

1997: 3 x SDLP, 2 x Sinn Féin

1993-1997 Change: Sinn Féin gain from SDLP

Shantallow - 5 seats
Party	Candidate	FPv%	Count						
Party	Candidate	FPv%	1	2	3	4	5	6	7
SDLP	Mary Bradley*	22.87%	1,826						
Sinn Féin	Tony Hassan	16.16%	1,290	1,304.84	1,306.84	1,307.84	1,325.68	1,658.68	
Sinn Féin	Gearóid Ó hEára*	14.21%	1,134	1,154.44	1,157.44	1,157.44	1,199.66	1,333.56	
SDLP	Shaun Gallagher*	10.92%	872	1,190.92	1,202.2	1,221.88	1,298.64	1,311.2	1,325.2
SDLP	William O'Connell*	12.86%	1,027	1,088.32	1,091.32	1,104.32	1,171.56	1,181.96	1,187.96
SDLP	Margaret McCartney*	9.76%	779	833.6	841.88	869.16	989.96	1,000.8	1,011.8
Sinn Féin	Bernadette McDaid	6.31%	504	508.2	509.32	509.32	522.88		
Labour Coalition	Charles McDaid	2.44%	195	197.8	222.8	232.8			
NI Women's Coalition	Diane Greer	2.07%	165	177.04	179.32	204.32			
DUP	William Dougherty	1.68%	134	136.24	137.24				
Labour Coalition	Robert Lindsay	0.51%	41	43.24					
Labour Coalition	Patrick Muldowney	0.20%	16	16.56					
Electorate: 13,598 Valid: 7,983 (58.71%) Spoilt: 188 Quota: 1,331 Turnout: 8,171 (60.09%)

== 1993 Election ==
1989: 4 x SDLP, 1 x Sinn Féin

1993: 4 x SDLP, 1 x Sinn Féin

1989-1993 Change: No change

Shantallow - 5 seats
Party	Candidate	FPv%	Count				
Party	Candidate	FPv%	1	2	3	4	5
SDLP	Mary Bradley*	30.54%	1,976				
Sinn Féin	Gearóid Ó hEára*	17.25%	1,116				
SDLP	Shaun Gallagher*	11.93%	772	1,320.16			
SDLP	Margaret McCartney	11.36%	735	851.64	1,024.56	1,051.96	1,158.96
SDLP	William O'Connell*	11.17%	723	880.92	931.96	952.58	1,049.92
Sinn Féin	James McKnight	9.32%	603	619.8	624.42	628.9	665.62
Independent Labour	Robert Lindsay	4.56%	295	323.32	330.14	441.64	
DUP	William Dougherty	3.03%	196	201.76	201.98		
Workers' Party	Edward Sharkey	0.83%	54	61.68	63.22		
Electorate: 11,001 Valid: 6,470 (58.81%) Spoilt: 232 Quota: 1,079 Turnout: 6,702 (60.92%)

== 1989 Election ==
1985: 4 x SDLP, 1 x Sinn Féin

1989: 4 x SDLP, 1 x Sinn Féin

1985-1989 Change: No change

Shantallow - 5 seats
Party	Candidate	FPv%	Count				
Party	Candidate	FPv%	1	2	3	4	5
SDLP	Mary Bradley*	24.47%	1,502				
SDLP	Noel McKenna*	19.60%	1,203				
SDLP	William O'Connell*	16.69%	1,024				
SDLP	Shaun Gallagher	13.08%	803	1,237.7			
Sinn Féin	Gearóid Ó hEára	12.37%	759	770.55	778.6	847.75	934.75
Sinn Féin	Richard Halpenny	9.55%	586	598.25	626.95	726.8	796.8
Ind. Nationalist	Thomas Mullan	4.24%	260	272.95	331.4		
Electorate: 10,573 Valid: 6,137 (58.04%) Spoilt: 228 Quota: 1,023 Turnout: 6,365 (60.20%)

== 1985 Election ==
1985: 4 x SDLP, 1 x Sinn Féin

Shantallow - 5 seats
Party	Candidate	FPv%	Count							
Party	Candidate	FPv%	1	2	3	4	5	6	7	8
SDLP	William O'Connell*	19.83%	1,117							
SDLP	Mary Bradley	19.42%	1,094							
SDLP	Noel McKenna	11.63%	655	743.96	772.1	776.4	783.62	883.14	890.28	951.36
Sinn Féin	Gerard Doherty	8.87%	500	501.28	504.78	511.38	517.7	520.7	754.14	796.6
SDLP	Teresa Coyle	7.90%	445	513.48	615.4	629.12	641.66	704.52	707.94	761.88
Sinn Féin	William McCartney	8.68%	489	490.44	491.7	505	518.14	519.3	686.78	734.22
Irish Independence	Robert Hegarty	4.31%	243	246.04	248.14	290.44	474.3	482.76	498.9	
Sinn Féin	Susan O'Hagan	7.72%	435	436.12	437.24	439.56	450.86	453.02		
Alliance	Gerard O'Grady	5.29%	298	302.32	304.56	308.88	316.34			
Irish Independence	James Nicholl	3.27%	184	187.52	191.02	270.44				
Irish Independence	Thomas Mullan	3.08%	174	176.72	179.94					
Electorate: 9,401 Valid: 5,634 (59.93%) Spoilt: 204 Quota: 940 Turnout: 5,838 (62.10%)
