= Waterside (District Electoral Area) =

District electoral area in Northern Ireland

- Derry and Strabane District Council DEA constituency

Current constituency
- Created: 2014
- Seats: 6 (1985-1993); 7 (1993-)
- Councillors: Chelsea Cooke (DUP); Darren Guy (UUP); Christopher Jackson (SF); Liz McGowan (SF); Niree McMorris (DUP); Sean Mooney (SDLP); Martin Reilly (SDLP)

Waterside DEA within Derry City and Strabane

Waterside DEA (1993-2014) within Derry

Waterside is one of the seven district electoral areas (DEA) in Derry and Strabane, Northern Ireland. The district elects seven members to Derry and Strabane District Council and contains the wards of Caw, Clondermot, Drumahoe, Ebrington, Kilfennan, Lisnagelvin and Victoria. Waterside forms part of the Foyle constituencies for the Northern Ireland Assembly and UK Parliament.

It was created for the 1985 local elections, replacing Londonderry Area B which had existed since 1973, where it originally contained six wards (Altnagelvin, Caw, Clondermot, Ebrington, Lisnagelvin and Victoria). For the 1993 local elections it gained an additional ward, Kilfennan.

== Councillors ==
Election	Councillor (party)	Councillor (party)	Councillor (party)	Councillor (party)	Councillor (party)	Councillor (party)	Councillor (party)
December 2025 Co-Option	Christopher Jackson (Sinn Féin)	Martin Reilly (SDLP)	Sean Mooney (SDLP)	Darren Guy (UUP)	Liz McGowan (Sinn Féin)	Chelsea Cooke (DUP)	Niree McMorris (DUP)
2023	Christopher Jackson (Sinn Féin)	Martin Reilly (SDLP)	Sean Mooney (SDLP)	Darren Guy (UUP)	Caitlin Deeney (Sinn Féin)	Chelsea Cooke (DUP)	Niree McMorris (DUP)
December 2022 co-option	Christopher Jackson (Sinn Féin)	Martin Reilly (SDLP)	Sean Mooney (SDLP)	Darren Guy (UUP)	Philip McKinney (Alliance)	Drew Thompson (DUP)	Niree McMorris (DUP)
June 2022 co-option	Christopher Jackson (Sinn Féin)	Martin Reilly (SDLP)	Sean Mooney (SDLP)	Darren Guy (UUP)	Philip McKinney (Alliance)	Drew Thompson (DUP)	David Ramsey (DUP)
February 2020 co-option	Christopher Jackson (Sinn Féin)	Martin Reilly (SDLP)	Sean Mooney (SDLP)	Darren Guy (UUP)	Philip McKinney (Alliance)	Hilary McClintock (DUP)	David Ramsey (DUP)
2019	Christopher Jackson (Sinn Féin)	Martin Reilly (SDLP)	Sinéad McLaughlin (SDLP)	Darren Guy (UUP)	Philip McKinney (Alliance)	Hilary McClintock (DUP)	David Ramsey (DUP)
November 2018 co-option	Christopher Jackson (Sinn Féin)	Martin Reilly (SDLP)	Sinéad McLaughlin (SDLP)	Mary Hamilton (UUP)	Drew Thompson (DUP)	Hilary McClintock (DUP)	David Ramsey (DUP)
January 2016 co-option	Christopher Jackson (Sinn Féin)	Martin Reilly (SDLP)	Tina Gardiner (SDLP)	Mary Hamilton (UUP)	Drew Thompson (DUP)	Hilary McClintock (DUP)	David Ramsey (DUP)
2014	Christopher Jackson (Sinn Féin)	Martin Reilly (SDLP)	Gerard Diver (SDLP)	Mary Hamilton (UUP)	Drew Thompson (DUP)	Hilary McClintock (DUP)	David Ramsey (DUP)
2011	Lynn Fleming (Sinn Féin)	Martin Reilly (SDLP)	Gerard Diver (SDLP)	Mary Hamilton (UUP)	Drew Thompson (DUP)	Joe Miller (DUP)	April Garfield-Kidd (DUP)
2005	Lynn Fleming (Sinn Féin)	Martin Reilly (SDLP)	Gerard Diver (SDLP)	Mary Hamilton (UUP)	Drew Thompson (DUP)	Joe Miller (DUP)	Gregory Campbell (DUP)
2001	Lynn Fleming (Sinn Féin)	Anne Marie McDaid (SDLP)	Gerard Diver (SDLP)	Mary Hamilton (UUP)	Mildred Garfield (DUP)	Joe Miller (DUP)	Gregory Campbell (DUP)
1997	Lynn Fleming (Sinn Féin)	Philip Kelly (SDLP)	James Guy (UUP)/ (Independent Unionist)	Richard Dallas (UUP)	Mildred Garfield (DUP)	Joe Miller (DUP)	Gregory Campbell (DUP)
1993	Wilfred White (SDLP)	Gerald Toland (SDLP)	James Guy (UUP)/ (Independent Unionist)	John Adams (UUP)	Bill Irwin (DUP)	Joe Miller (DUP)	Gregory Campbell (DUP)
1989	6 seats 1985–1993	Gerald Toland (SDLP)	James Guy (UUP)/ (Independent Unionist)	George Duddy (UUP)	Kenneth Kerr (UDP)	Joe Miller (DUP)	Gregory Campbell (DUP)
1985	6 seats 1985–1993	Michael Fegan (SDLP)	James Guy (UUP)/ (Independent Unionist)	George Duddy (UUP)	Annette Hamilton (DUP)	Margaret Buchanan (DUP)	Gregory Campbell (DUP)

== 2023 election ==
2019: 2 x DUP, 2 x SDLP, 1 x Sinn Féin, 1 x UUP, 1 x Alliance

2023: 2 x Sinn Féin, 2 x DUP, 2 x SDLP, 1 x UUP

2019–2023 change: Sinn Féin gain from Alliance

Waterside - 7 seats
Party	Candidate	FPv%	Count						
Party	Candidate	FPv%	1	2	3	4	5	6	7
Sinn Féin	Caitlin Deeney †	17.86%	1,949						
UUP	Darren Guy*	16.47%	1,797						
Sinn Féin	Christopher Jackson*	9.34%	1,019	1,540.10					
DUP	Chelsea Cooke	11.56%	1,262	1,262.30	1,316.54	1,319.54	1,320.05	1,526.05	
DUP	Niree McMorris*	11.23%	1,225	1,225	1,279.72	1,281.72	1,282.06	1,368.06	
SDLP	Sean Mooney*	9.81%	1,071	1,105.20	1,109.76	1,213.90	1,323.55	1,355.11	1,361.11
SDLP	Martin Reilly*	9.22%	1,006	1,013.80	1,020.28	1,092.26	1,120.65	1,154.21	1,163.21
Alliance	Philip McKinney*	6.85%	748	758.50	773.62	916.54	945.10	1,105.05	1,153.05
UUP	Janice Montgomery	4.11%	448	448.30	737.50	743.46	744.82		
People Before Profit	Davina Pulvis	3.56%	388	393.70	396.34				
Electorate: 21,240 Valid: 10,913 (51.38%) Spoilt: 202 Quota: 1,365 Turnout: 11,115 (52.33%)

== 2019 election ==
2014: 3 x DUP, 2 x SDLP, 1 x Sinn Féin, 1 x UUP

2019: 2 x DUP, 2 x SDLP, 1 x Sinn Féin, 1 x UUP, 1 x Alliance

2014-2019 change: Alliance gain from DUP

Waterside - 7 seats
Party	Candidate	FPv%	Count							
Party	Candidate	FPv%	1	2	3	4	5	6	7	8
UUP	Darren Guy	15.96%	1,589							
SDLP	Sinead McLaughlin †	14.90%	1,483							
DUP	Hilary McClintock* †	12.56%	1,250							
SDLP	Martin Reilly*	9.43%	939	966.37	1,158.69	1,158.69	1,395.69			
Sinn Féin	Christopher Jackson*	8.29%	825	826.15	865.43	865.43	918.07	935	1,685.07	
Alliance	Philip McKinney	7.18%	715	772.5	783.7	783.7	1,046.17	1,126.17	1,166.76	1,275.76
DUP	David Ramsey* †	8.43%	839	957.68	958.64	958.64	969.87	971.87	974.1	975.1
DUP	Drew Thompson*	7.83%	780	889.02	889.18	889.18	903.71	904.71	906.71	910.71
Sinn Féin	Sharon McLaughlin	7.87%	784	784.23	792.87	792.87	843.38	871.38		
People Before Profit	Maeve O'Neill	7.55%	752	770.86	782.7	782.7				
Electorate: 19,558 Valid: 9,956 (50.91%) Spoilt: 178 Quota: 1,245 Turnout: 10,134 (51.82%)

== 2014 election ==
2011: 3 x DUP, 2 x SDLP, 1 x Sinn Féin, 1 x UUP

2014: 3 x DUP, 2 x SDLP, 1 x Sinn Féin, 1 x UUP

2011-2014 change: No change

Waterside - 7 seats
Party	Candidate	FPv%	Count										
Party	Candidate	FPv%	1	2	3	4	5	6	7	8	9	10	11
SDLP	Gerard Diver* ††	12.20%	1,080	1,121									
UUP	Mary Hamilton*	11.82%	1,046	1,047	1,058	1,079	1,166						
Sinn Féin	Christopher Jackson	12.01%	1,063	1,075	1,075	1,084	1,086	1,086	1,089	1,092.42	1,092.42	1,671.42	
SDLP	Martin Reilly*	10.00%	884	899	900	1,014	1,020	1,020.76	1,034.76	1,044.45	1,046.45	1,106.21	
DUP	David Ramsey	6.25%	553	553	561	562	588	591.8	662.56	662.56	1,083.32	1,085.32	1,088.32
DUP	Hilary McClintock	9.16%	811	812	826	837	861	864.8	915.8	916.37	1,013.89	1,015.89	1,017.89
DUP	Drew Thompson*	6.86%	607	607	613	620	642	645.04	728.8	728.8	762.32	763.32	767.32
UUP	Julia Kee	5.26%	465	466	472	484	508	547.52	703.28	704.42	727.18	729.18	735.18
Sinn Féin	Bridget Meehan	7.41%	656	662	663	673	674	674	677	677.57	679.33		
DUP	Niree McMorris	5.96%	528	528	530	531	557	563.08	594.08	594.65			
UKIP	Kyle Thompson	3.25%	287	287	450	456	514	517.8					
PUP	Nigel Gardiner	3.10%	274	277	285	288							
Alliance	Asta Kereviciene	2.73%	241	245	246								
UKIP	David Malcolm	2.54%	224	225									
Independent	Michael Carlin	1.28%	113										
Electorate: 18,549 Valid: 8,832 (47.61%) Spoilt: 166 Quota: 1,105 Turnout: 8,998 (48.51%)

== 2011 election ==
2005: 3 x DUP, 2 x SDLP, 1 x Sinn Féin, 1 x UUP

2011: 3 x DUP, 2 x SDLP, 1 x Sinn Féin, 1 x UUP

2005-2011 change: No change

Waterside - 7 seats
Party	Candidate	FPv%	Count									
Party	Candidate	FPv%	1	2	3	4	5	6	7	8	9	10
DUP	Joe Miller*	19.29%	1,564									
SDLP	Gerard Diver*	14.78%	1,198									
Sinn Féin	Lynn Fleming*	14.02%	1,137									
DUP	April Garfield-Kidd	12.41%	1,006	1,312.6								
DUP	Drew Thompson*	10.59%	859	1,010.9	1,277.12							
UUP	Mary Hamilton*	11.64%	944	997.55	1,012.51	1,110.09						
SDLP	Martin Reilly*	5.90%	478	483.95	485.31	492.45	645.73	656.77	663.57	729.21	823.28	858.28
Sinn Féin	Geraldine O'Donnell	4.37%	354	355.05	355.05	355.05	366.57	473.73	473.73	478.17	503.03	507.03
PUP	Nigel Gardiner	2.52%	204	216.25	226.11	253.31	254.91	254.91	296.39	304.28	325.47	
People Before Profit	David McAuley	2.74%	222	223.75	224.77	226.47	230.63	232.91	234.27	253.57		
Alliance	Karen Scrivens	1.75%	142	144.45	144.79	148.19	154.11	155.31	161.77			
Electorate: 15,252 Valid: 8,108 (53.16%) Spoilt: 251 Quota: 1,014 Turnout: 8,359 (54.81%)

== 2005 election ==
2001: 3 x DUP, 2 x SDLP, 1 x Sinn Féin, 1 x UUP

2005: 3 x DUP, 2 x SDLP, 1 x Sinn Féin, 1 x UUP

2001-2005 change: No change

Waterside - 7 seats
Party	Candidate	FPv%	Count					
Party	Candidate	FPv%	1	2	3	4	5	6
DUP	Gregory Campbell*	16.19%	1,521					
SDLP	Gerard Diver*	16.05%	1,508					
DUP	Joe Miller*	12.64%	1,187					
Sinn Féin	Lynn Fleming*	11.54%	1,084	1,085.84	1,107.62	1,126.84	1,524.71	
SDLP	Martin Reilly	6.04%	567	568.15	833.69	910.17	958.45	1,123.15
DUP	Drew Thompson	10.50%	986	1,091.34	1,092	1,107.92	1,109.92	1,109.92
UUP	Mary Hamilton*	10.83%	1,017	1,070.13	1,079.37	1,101.6	1,101.82	1,101.82
DUP	Mildred Garfield*	9.40%	883	1,061.94	1,066.56	1,086.25	1,087.25	1,087.25
Sinn Féin	Jim Logue	4.76%	447	447.23	457.35	472.13		
Socialist Environmental	David McAuley	2.74%	194	196.07	204.65			
Electorate: 14,884 Valid: 9,394 (63.11%) Spoilt: 208 Quota: 1,175 Turnout: 9,602 (64.51%)

== 2001 election ==
1997: 3 x DUP, 1 x SDLP, 1 x UUP, 1 x Sinn Féin, 1 x Independent Unionist

2001: 3 x DUP, 2 x SDLP, 1 x UUP, 1 x Sinn Féin

1997-2001 change: SDLP gain from Independent Unionist

Waterside - 7 seats
Party	Candidate	FPv%	Count										
Party	Candidate	FPv%	1	2	3	4	5	6	7	8	9	10	11
DUP	Gregory Campbell*	18.22%	1,887										
SDLP	Gerard Diver	12.85%	1,330										
DUP	Joe Miller*	11.76%	1,218	1,382.16									
Sinn Féin	Lynn Fleming*	9.41%	974	974	974	983	983	985.32	1,003.96	1,307.96			
UUP	Mary Hamilton	9.48%	982	1,028.08	1,034.96	1,036.96	1,089.68	1,124.96	1,165.2	1,165.2	1,515.72		
DUP	Mildred Garfield*	6.86%	710	985.84	1,011.44	1,013.44	1,015.08	1,060.24	1,070.48	1,070.48	1,083.92	1,129.51	1,263.11
SDLP	Anne Marie McDaid	7.89%	817	817	817.16	828.16	828.48	830.48	915.64	945.64	948.64	970.95	1,108.71
DUP	Drew Thompson	6.46%	669	697.16	741	743.32	747.12	770.88	772.52	772.84	784.88	844.05	1,019.67
Independent	James Guy*	4.67%	484	514.4	516.96	522.96	527.28	541.16	631.48	634.48	685.88	778.03	
UUP	James McCorkell	3.49%	361	373.16	375.88	377.88	410.8	430.12	454.12	454.12			
Sinn Féin	Francis O'Deorain	3.26%	338	338.64	338.64	342.64	342.64	342.64	342.64				
Alliance	Colm Cavanagh	2.61%	270	278	278.32	289.32	289.96	301.6					
PUP	Catherine Cooke	1.48%	153	170.6	171.08	176.08	177.08						
UUP	Gordon Hill	0.95%	98	104.4	105.36	106.36							
Independent	William Webster	0.61%	63	63.32	63.32								
Electorate: 15,882 Valid: 10,354 (65.19%) Spoilt: 226 Quota: 1,295 Turnout: 10,580 (66.62%)

== 1997 election ==
1993: 3 x DUP, 2 x SDLP, 1 x UUP, 1 x Independent Unionist

1997: 3 x DUP, 1 x SDLP, 1 x UUP, 1 x Sinn Féin, 1 x Independent Unionist

1993-1997 change: Sinn Féin gain from SDLP

Waterside - 7 seats
Party	Candidate	FPv%	Count							
Party	Candidate	FPv%	1	2	3	4	5	6	7	8
UUP	Richard Dallas*	16.77%	1,535							
DUP	Gregory Campbell*	16.36%	1,497							
SDLP	Philip Kelly	11.48%	1,051	1,051.25	1,051.73	1,124.73	1,127.73	1,128.21	1,815.21	
Sinn Féin	Lynn Fleming	9.87%	903	903.25	904.21	925.21	925.21	926.45	967.45	1,120.45
DUP	Joe Miller*	8.18%	749	789.75	851.91	862.13	946.17	1,098.86	1,100.86	1,106.86
Ind. Unionist	James Guy*	7.33%	671	717.25	762.37	815.35	850.26	877.66	905.66	1,082.66
DUP	Mildred Garfield	5.65%	517	544.5	680.1	691.54	736.97	1,056.75	1,060.75	1,061.75
UUP	Mary Hamilton	5.43%	497	722	757.04	770.03	821.72	850.56	850.56	850.56
SDLP	Wilfred White*	8.29%	759	759	759	795	798	799		
DUP	Bill Irwin*	4.84%	443	464.5	517.06	519.06	560.99			
Ulster Democratic	David Nicholl	3.02%	276	290	304.88	318.87				
NI Women's Coalition	Helena Schlindwein	1.60%	146	146.5	147.22					
Labour Coalition	Kenneth Adams	0.94%	86	89.75	93.11					
Ind. Nationalist	Gerald Toland*	0.24%	22	22	22					
Electorate: 15,408 Valid: 9,152 (59.40%) Spoilt: 186 Quota: 1,145 Turnout: 9,338 (60.60%)

== 1993 election ==
1989: 2 x DUP, 1 x SDLP, 1 x UUP, 1 x UDP, 1 x Independent Unionist

1993: 3 x DUP, 2 x SDLP, 1 x UUP, 1 x Independent Unionist

1989-1993 change: DUP and SDLP gain from UDP and due to the addition of one seat

Waterside - 7 seats
Party	Candidate	FPv%	Count											
Party	Candidate	FPv%	1	2	3	4	5	6	7	8	9	10	11	12
DUP	Gregory Campbell*	16.12%	1,469											
DUP	Joe Miller*	12.70%	1,157											
DUP	Bill Irwin	8.15%	743	916.8	925.63	928.63	942.74	948.64	980.25	987.26	1,004.24	1,216.24		
UUP	John Adams*	9.11%	830	862.78	863.44	866.44	916.89	952.87	975.44	1,000.88	1,110.91	1,154.91		
Ind. Unionist	James Guy*	6.77%	617	643.18	643.69	652.69	659.91	668.35	677.15	776.18	792.64	813.13	838.33	1,190.33
SDLP	Gerald Toland*	9.54%	869	869.44	869.44	897.44	898.44	898.44	899.44	952.67	953.67	953.67	953.67	965.78
SDLP	Wilfred White	9.25%	843	843.66	843.66	856.66	859.66	860.66	860.66	887.66	888.66	888.66	888.66	893.41
Sinn Féin	Gary Fleming	8.56%	780	780.22	780.22	788.22	789.44	789.44	789.44	790.44	791.66	791.66	791.66	793.49
UUP	Derry Burgess	4.33%	395	413.26	413.54	422.76	426.98	463.76	474.01	499.02	671.83	720.47	770.27	
Ulster Democratic	James Millar	2.61%	238	255.16	255.32	256.32	268.34	271.78	429.46	430.46	444.22			
UUP	Jacqueline Colhoun	2.35%	214	229.84	230.06	232.06	236.51	343.4	350.74	363.96				
Alliance	Snoo Sinclair	2.78%	253	253.88	253.95	286.95	289.95	289.95	292.95					
Ulster Democratic	Kenneth Kerr*	2.54%	231	248.6	248.98	253.98	270.98	270.99						
UUP	William Houston	2.12%	193	200.92	201.01	203.01	206.01							
Independent	David Nicholl	1.55%	141	145.4	145.45	148.45								
Independent Labour	William Anderson	1.53%	139	139.44	139.44									
Electorate: 14,760 Valid: 9,112 (61.73%) Spoilt: 226 Quota: 1,140 Turnout: 9,338 (63.27%)

== 1989 election ==
1985: 3 x DUP, 2 x UUP, 1 x SDLP

1989: 2 x DUP, 1 x UUP, 1 x SDLP, 1 x UDP, 1 x Independent Unionist

1985-1989 change: UDP gain from DUP, Independent Unionist leaves UUP

Waterside - 6 seats
Party	Candidate	FPv%	Count									
Party	Candidate	FPv%	1	2	3	4	5	6	7	8	9	10
DUP	Gregory Campbell*	22.07%	1,737									
UUP	George Duddy*	5.70%	449	500.45	511.15	519.5	656.5	1,153.45				
DUP	Joe Miller	9.88%	778	875.65	881.35	900.75	925.25	945.15	949.74	949.74	1,245.74	
Ind. Unionist	James Guy*	9.95%	783	815.9	913.95	922.3	966.15	1,002.45	1,014.6	1,033	1,112.42	1,155.89
SDLP	Gerald Toland	10.41%	819	819	862	863	863	863	863	1,034.62	1,034.62	1,034.62
Ulster Democratic	Kenneth Kerr	4.94%	389	429.95	433.95	656.8	674.9	687.3	687.84	687.84	810	885.9
SDLP	Wilfred White	9.30%	732	732	753	753	753	754	754	791	791	791
DUP	Robert Hall	4.00%	315	594.65	602	610.4	619.9	636.15	646.68	646.68		
Sinn Féin	John Carlin	8.12%	639	639.35	642.35	642.35	642.35	644.75	645.02			
UUP	Gladys Carey	4.61%	363	422.15	432.85	436.2	602.4					
UUP	Albert McCartney	4.66%	367	391.5	404.85	407.2						
Ulster Democratic	Ronnie O'Brien	3.33%	262	270.4	276.75							
Alliance	Snoo Sinclair	3.02%	238	243.6								
Electorate: 12,405 Valid: 7,871 (63.45%) Spoilt: 159 Quota: 1,125 Turnout: 8,030 (64.73%)

== 1985 election ==
1985: 3 x DUP, 2 x UUP, 1 x SDLP

Waterside - 6 seats
Party	Candidate	FPv%	Count								
Party	Candidate	FPv%	1	2	3	4	5	6	7	8	9
DUP	Gregory Campbell*	30.05%	2,374								
DUP	Margaret Buchanan*	10.27%	811	1,402.76							
UUP	James Guy*	10.35%	818	920.96	937.04	999.92	1,001.92	1,159.96			
SDLP	Michael Fegan*	11.06%	874	875.56	875.56	875.56	985.56	1,071.56	1,201.56		
UUP	George Duddy	5.90%	466	532.56	556.56	637.68	638.92	690.48	691.48	693.48	1,136.44
DUP	Annette Hamilton	2.10%	166	560.16	777.84	786.08	786.08	803.16	803.16	803.16	894.12
SDLP	Paul O'Donnell	7.44%	588	588.52	588.52	589.52	640.52	674.52	762.52	817.52	820.52
UUP	Robert Ferris*	5.84%	461	508.84	517.48	543.52	544.52	594.52	597.52	597.52	
Sinn Féin	Michael Roddy	6.11%	483	483	483	484	535	535			
Alliance	Robert McCullough	5.43%	429	434.2	434.92	439.92	446.92				
Irish Independence	Robert Concannon	3.30%	261	262.04	263	263.52					
UUP	Andrew McManus	2.14%	169	185.64	187.56						
Electorate: 11,705 Valid: 7,900 (67.49%) Spoilt: 144 Quota: 1,129 Turnout: 8,044 (68.72%)
