= Mayor of Derry City and Strabane =

Honorary position in Northern Ireland

Mayor of Derry City and Strabane District Council
- City Coat of Arms of Derry

- Flag of Derry
- Incumbent; Grace Uí Niallais since 1 June, 2026
- Appointer: Derry and Strabane District Council
- Term length: 1 year
- Inaugural holder: John Rowley
- Formation: 1604 (as Provost); 1613 (as Mayor)
- Deputy: Catherine McDaid
- Website: Council Website

The Mayor of Derry City and Strabane District Council is an honorary position bestowed upon a citizen of Derry City & Strabane District in Northern Ireland, who is in practice a member of Derry and Strabane District Council, chosen by their peers on the council to serve a one-year term. The mayor is the chairperson of the council as well as the city's first citizen. The current mayor is Grace Uí Niallais of Sinn Féin. The current deputy mayor is Catherine McDaid of the Social Democratic and Labour Party.

The district was created in 2015 by the merger of two existing councils. The previous post of Mayor of Derry, more formally Lord Mayor of Londonderry, has a long history. A provost, Sir Henry Docwra, was appointed in the initial city charter of 1604 by James I. In 1613, this post was replaced with that of governor, or mayor, with John Rowley being the first to serve. The City charter of 1665 which provided:

And further we will, and by these presents for us our heirs and successors do grant and ordain, that for ever hereafter there be and shall be within the city of Londonderry aforesaid one of the more honest and discreet citizens of the said city, or of the more honest and discreet inhabitants within the liberty of the same, in form hereafter in these presents mentioned, from time to time to be elected, who shall be and called the mayor of the said city.

During much of its history, it has been held by unionists (largely due to the practice of gerrymandering), but in recent years, the majority of mayors have been Irish nationalists, reflecting the majority of the city's population.

From 1921 until 1969, the Lord Mayor was automatically entitled to a seat in the Senate of Northern Ireland.

== List of mayors ==
=== 17th century ===
Term	Name	Party
1615	John Vaughan	
1617	Sir John Vaughan	
1618	John Wray	
1620 – 1621	Jesse Smith	
1625	H Vaughan	
1629	Sir John Vaughan	
1631	William Gage	
1636	Thomas Hammond	
1639	Peter Benson	
1641	James Vaughan	
1643	Sir Robert Stewart	
1644	Colonel Audley Mervyn	
1646	Sir Charles Coote	
1653	Henry Finch	
1654	Ralph King	
1655 – 1656	John Handford	
1657	John Elwin	
1658	Samuel Dawson (died in office)	
1659	John Westgate	
1660	Luke Ash	
1662	William Gardner	
1664	Colonel John Gorges	
1670	Thomas Skipton	
1671	Hugh Edwards	
1672 – 1674	Samuel Norman	
1675 – 1676	Gervais Squire	
1677	Colonel William Cecil	
1678 – 1680	Thomas Moncrieff	
1681 – 1682	John Campsie	
1683	Alexander Tomkins	
1684	James Hobson	
1685 – 1686	John Campsie	
1687	Andrew Coningham (died in office)	
1688	John Campsie	
1690	Gervais Squire	
1691	Alexander Lecky	
1692	William Squire (died in office)	
1693	James Lenox	
1694	Henry Long	
1695	Alexander Lecky	
1696	Henry Ash	
1697	James Lenox	
1698	Horace Kennedy	
1699	Gervais Squire	
1700	Edward Brooks	

=== 18th century ===
From	To	Name
1701		Thomas Moncrieff
1702		Robert Shannon
1703	1704	Samuel Leeson
1705		Henry Ash
1706		George Tomkins
1707		Charles Norman
1708		Thomas Lecky
1709		Thomas Ash
1710		Samuel Leeson
1711		Robert Norman
1712		John Wotton
1713		Alexander Tomkins
1714		John Wotton
1769	1770	Robert Fairly
1771		Adam Schoales
1772		Hugh Hill
1773		William Lecky
1774	1775	Charles M'Manus
1776		Thomas Bateson
1777		John Coningham
1778		John Ferguson
1779		George Ash
1780	1781	Thomas Lecky
1782		Robert Fairly
1783	1784	John Coningham
1785	1786	Squire Lecky
1787	1788	John Coningham
1789		Squire Lecky
1790	1791	Eneas Murray
1792	1793	Stephen Bennett
1794	1795	George Kennedy
1796	1797	Andrew Ferguson
1798	1799	John Darcus
1800	1801	William Walker

=== 19th century ===
From	To	Name	Party
1802		R. G. Hill	
1803		John Darcus	
1804	1805	R. Murray	
1806	1807	William Walker	
1808	1809	Thomas Lecky	
1810	1811	Thomas Scott	
1812	1813	John Curry	
1814	1815	Marcus S. Hill	
1816	1817	William Alexander	
1818	1819	William Scott	
1820	1821	Sir John Maginnis	
1822	1823	John Dysart	
1824	1825	John Rea	
1826	1827	Richard Young	
1828	1829	Conolly Skipton	
1830		Sir R.A. Ferguson (resigned), then J. Dysart	
1831		Richard Young	
1832	1833	George Hill	
1834	1835	Joshua Gillespie	
1836	1837	Thomas P. Kennedy	
1838	1839	Sir Robert Bateson, Bt	
1840	1841	Joseph E. Miller	
1842	1843	Conolly Lecky	
1843	1845	William Haslett	
1845	1846	John Munn	
1846	1847	Daniel Baird	
1847		Alexander Lindsay	
1859	1862	Bartholomew McCorkell JP	
1868	1869	Sir Edward Reid	Conservative
1875	1877	Sir William Miller, MD	Conservative
	1883	Henry Darcus	
?	1887?	(Sir) Thomas Lecky	
1888	1889	Sir William Miller	Conservative
1898	1899	Sir John Barr Johnston	
1899	1900	Sir William McLearn	Irish Unionist

=== 20th century ===
From	To	Name	Party
1901	1902	Sir Francis Henry Miller	Irish Unionist
1908	1911	John McFarland	Irish Unionist
1911	1912	Matthew Anderson Ballantine	Irish Unionist
1912	1913	John McFarland	Irish Unionist
1913	1915	William McLearn	Irish Unionist
1915	1920	Robert Newton Anderson	Irish Unionist
1920	1923	Hugh O'Doherty	Nationalist
1923	1925	Maxwell Scott Moore	UUP
1925	1927	John Gilbert Magee	UUP
1927	1929	James Hamilton	UUP
1929	1935	Dudley McCorkell	UUP
1935	1939	James McElmunn Wilton	UUP
1939	1940	Basil McFarland	UUP
1940	1945	Frederick James Simmons	UUP
1945	1950	Basil McFarland	UUP
1950	1952	Gerald Stanley Glover	UUP
1952	1954	Samuel Orr	UUP
1954	1957	Samuel Sydney Dowds	UUP
1957	1961	John Gordon Colhoun	UUP
1961	1963	Gerald Stanley Glover	UUP
1963	1968	Albert Anderson	UUP
1968	1969	William Beatty	UUP
1969	1973	Post vacant - council replaced by interim development commission	
1973	1974	Raymond McClean	SDLP
1974	1975	Jack Allen	UUP
1975	1976	Ivor Canavan	Alliance
1976	1977	James Hegarty	Nationalist
1977	1978	Hugh Doherty	SDLP
1978	1979	Thomas M. Craig	UUP
1979	1980	Pat Devine	SDLP
1980	1981	Marleen Jefferson	UUP
1981	1982	Joe Fegan	SDLP
1982	1983	William O'Connell	SDLP
1983	1984	Len Green	SDLP
1984	1985	John Tierney	SDLP
1985	1986	John McNickle	SDLP
1986	1987	Noel McKenna	SDLP
1987	1988	James Guy	Ind. Unionist
1988	1989	Annie Gallagher	SDLP
1989	1990	Tony Carlin	SDLP
1990	1991	David Davis	Ind. Unionist
1991	1992	Mary Bradley	SDLP
1992	1993	William Hay	DUP
1993	1994	Annie Courtney	SDLP
1994	1995	James Guy	Ind. Unionist
1995	1996	John Kerr	SDLP
1996	1997	Richard Dallas	UUP
1997	1998	Martin Bradley	SDLP
1998	1999	Joe Millar	DUP
1999	2000	Pat Ramsey	SDLP

=== 21st century ===
From	To	Name	Party
2000	2001	Cathal Crumley	Sinn Féin
2001	2002	Mildred Garfield	DUP
2002	2003	Kathleen McCloskey	SDLP
2003	2004	Shaun Gallagher	SDLP
2004	2005	Gearóid Ó hEára	Sinn Féin
2005	2006	Lynn Fleming	Sinn Féin
2006	2007	Helen Quigley	SDLP
2007	2008	Drew Thompson	DUP
2008	2009	Gerard Diver	SDLP
2009	2010	Paul Fleming	Sinn Féin
2010	2011	Colum Eastwood	SDLP
2011	2012	Maurice Devenney	DUP
2012	2013	Kevin Campbell	Sinn Féin
2013	2014	Martin Reilly	SDLP
2014	2015	Brenda Stevenson	SDLP
2015	2016	Elisha McCallion	Sinn Féin
2016	2017	Hilary McClintock	DUP
2017	2018	Maolíosa McHugh	Sinn Féin
2018	2019	John Boyle	SDLP
2019	2020	Michaela Boyle	Sinn Féin
2020	2021	Brian Tierney	SDLP
2021	2022	Graham Warke	DUP
2022	2023	Sandra Duffy	Sinn Féin
2023	2024	Patricia Logue	Sinn Féin
2024	2025	Lilian Seenoi-Barr	SDLP
2025	2026	Ruairí McHugh	Sinn Féin
2026		Grace Uí Niallais	Sinn Féin
