= Henry Miller (Irish politician) =

Rugby union player from Northern Ireland

Sir Henry Miller
- Full name: Francis Henry Miller
- Born: 5 October 1865 Derry, Ireland
- Died: 16 June 1936 (aged 70) Derry, Northern Ireland

Rugby union career
- Position: Forward
International career
Years	Team	Apps	(Points)
1886	Ireland	1	(0)

Sir Francis Henry Miller (5 October 1865 — 16 June 1936) was an Irish politician and international rugby union player.

Miller attended Foyle College while growing up in Derry and studied law at Trinity College Dublin.

A Wanderers forward, Miller was capped for Ireland against Scotland at Edinburgh in 1886.

Miller was admitted as a solicitor in 1888.

As a member of the Irish Unionist Party, Miller followed both his grandfather and father in serving as mayor of Derry when he was appointed to the role in 1901. During his second year in office, Miller was knighted after the coronation of Edward VII. He became the Derry town clerk in 1903.

== See also ==
- List of Ireland national rugby union players
