= Gerard Diver =

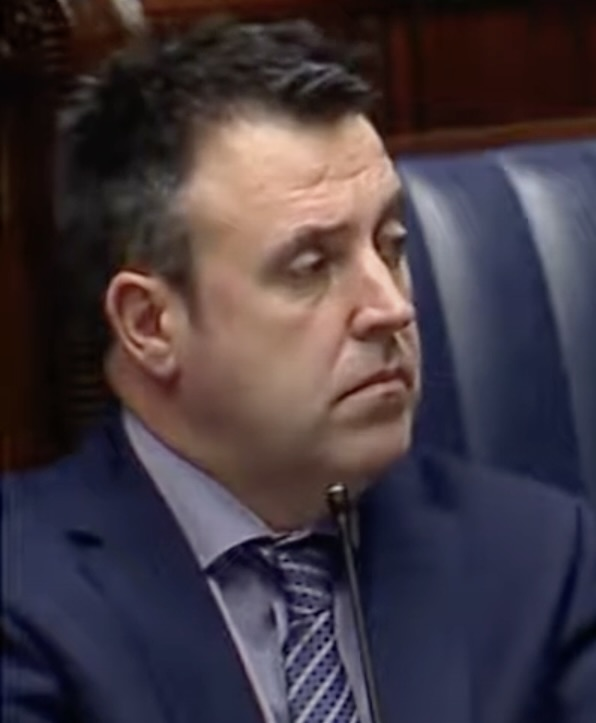
- Diver in 2016

Member of the Legislative Assembly for Foyle
- In office 7 January 2016 – 30 March 2016
- Preceded by: Pat Ramsey
- Succeeded by: Eamon McCann

Member of Derry City and Strabane District Council
- In office 22 May 2014 – 7 January 2016
- Preceded by: Council created
- Succeeded by: Tina Gardiner
- Constituency: Waterside

Member of Derry City Council
- In office 7 June 2001 – 22 May 2014
- Preceded by: James Guy
- Succeeded by: Council abolished
- Constituency: Waterside

Personal details
- Born: 1 January 1965 (age 61) Derry, Northern Ireland
- Party: SDLP
- Occupation: Politician

Gerard Diver (born 1 January 1965) is an Irish Social Democratic and Labour Party (SDLP) politician who served as a Member of the Legislative Assembly (MLA) for Foyle between January and March 2016.

== Political career ==
Diver was first elected to Derry City Council in 2001, representing the DEA of Waterside in Derry. From 2008 to 2009, Diver served as Mayor of Derry. In 2014, after the boundary changes, Diver was re-elected onto the newly formed Derry City and Strabane District Council. In 2015, veteran SDLP MLA Pat Ramsey announced his retirement from the Northern Ireland Assembly; Diver was selected as his replacement and co-opted onto Ramsey's seat in early 2016.

Civic offices
Preceded by Drew Thompson	Mayor of Derry; 2008–2009	Succeeded by Paul Fleming
Northern Ireland Assembly
Preceded by Pat Ramsey	MLA for Foyle; 2015–2016	Succeeded by Eamonn McCann
