= Maurice Devenney =

British politician (born 1959)

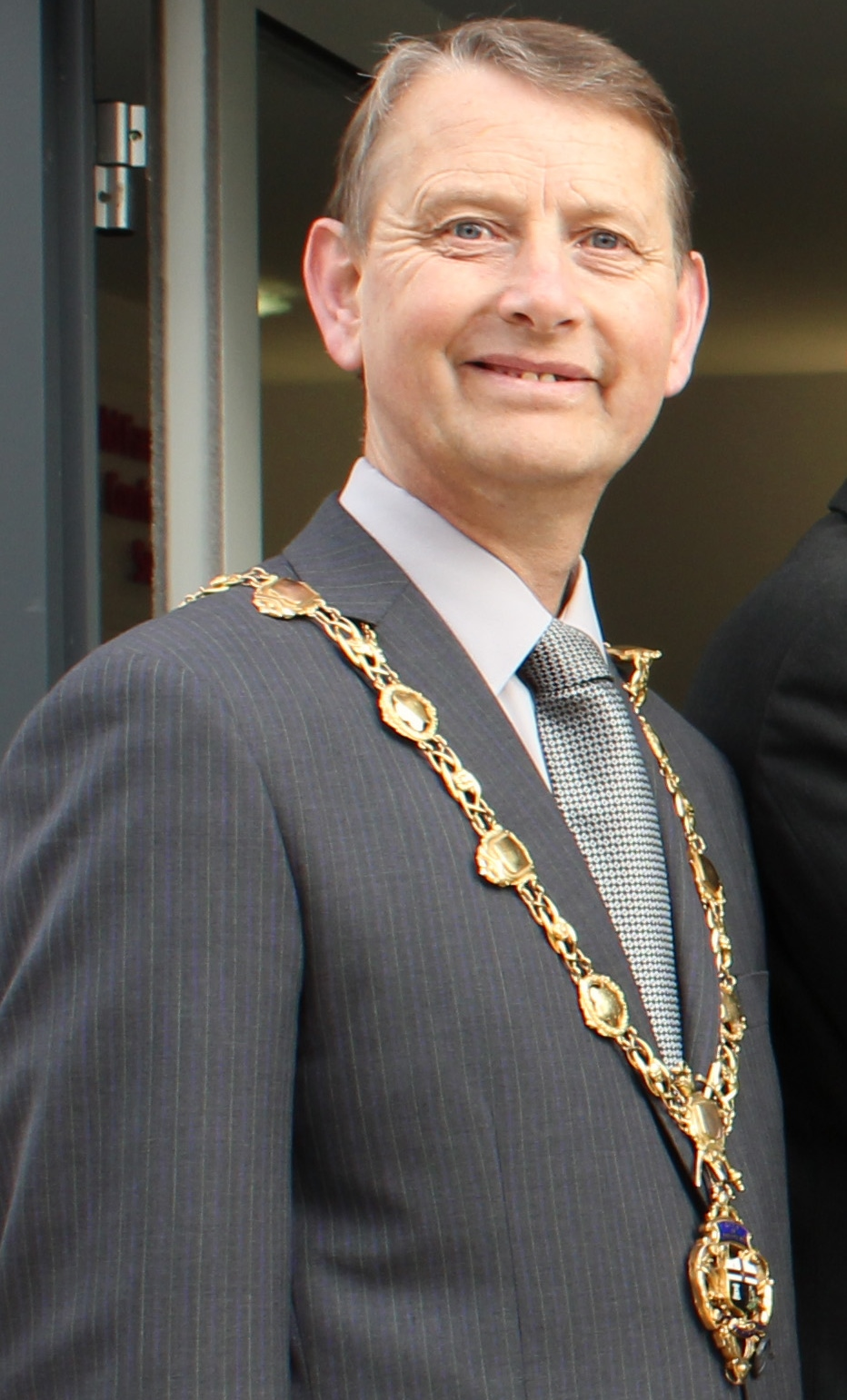
- Devenney as Mayor of Derry, 2012

Member of Derry City and Strabane District Council
- In office 2 May 2019 – 18 May 2023
- Preceded by: Rhonda Hamilton
- Succeeded by: Fergal Leonard
- Constituency: Sperrin
- In office 22 May 2014 – 2 May 2019
- Preceded by: New council
- Succeeded by: Ryan McCready
- Constituency: Faughan

Member of the Legislative Assembly for Foyle
- In office 20 October 2014 – 25 March 2015
- Preceded by: William Hay
- Succeeded by: Gary Middleton

Mayor of Derry
- In office 2011–2012
- Preceded by: Colum Eastwood
- Succeeded by: Kevin Campbell

Member of Derry City Council
- In office 5 May 2005 – 22 May 2014
- Preceded by: Andrew Davidson
- Succeeded by: Council abolished
- Constituency: Rural

Personal details
- Born: 1 January 1959 (age 67) Manorcunningham,County Donegal, Republic of Ireland
- Party: Independent Unionist (2016-2019); DUP (1997-2016; 2019 - 2025)

Maurice Devenney (born 1 January 1959) is a former Democratic Unionist Party (DUP) politician who was a Derry and Strabane Councillor for the Sperrin DEA from 2019 to 2023. Devenney also briefly served as a Member of the Northern Ireland Assembly (MLA) for Foyle from 2014 to 2015.

== Career ==
Devenney was first elected to Derry City Council in 2005 as a member for the Rural DEA, having unsuccessfully contested that district in 1997. Between 2011 and 2012, he served as Mayor of the city. He was elected to the successor council of Derry and Strabane, representing the Faughan DEA, in 2014.

In October 2014, he was co-opted to the Northern Ireland Assembly to replace retiring Speaker and MLA for Foyle, Willie Hay, but resigned from the Assembly five months later to continue as a councillor.

In February 2016, Devenney resigned from the DUP. A few weeks beforehand, he had been suspended from the party. The suspension was linked to an allegation that Devenney had encouraged DUP voters to instead vote for the SDLP candidate Mark Durkan outside a polling station. Devenney later denied these allegations and claimed they were part of an underlying scheme by the Democratic Unionist Party to withdraw him from the organisation for having opposing political views.

He would go on to contest Foyle as an Independent in the Assembly election that same year, but was unsuccessful, polling 1,173 first preference votes (2.95% of votes cast.)

In 2019, Devenney rejoined the DUP, and was subsequently elected onto Derry and Strabane Council in the that year's local elections, this time representing the Sperrin DEA. He lost his seat in the 2023 local elections.

Civic offices
Preceded by Colum Eastwood	Mayor of Derry; 2011 to 2012	Succeeded by Kevin Campbell
Northern Ireland Assembly
Preceded by William Hay	MLA for Foyle; 2014 – 2015	Succeeded by Gary Middleton
