= Foyle (UK Parliament constituency) =

UK Parliament constituency (since 1983)

Coordinates: 55.026°N 7.396°W

- County constituency for the House of Commons
- Interactive map of boundaries from 2024
- Location within Northern Ireland
- District: Derry City and Strabane
- Electorate: 73,456 (July 2024)
- Major settlements: Derry

Current constituency
- Created: 1983
- Member of Parliament: Colum Eastwood (SDLP)
- Seats: 1
- Created from: Londonderry; Mid Ulster (small parts of)

Foyle is a constituency in Northern Ireland represented in the House of Commons of the UK Parliament. It covers the city of Derry, on the Irish border, and is named for the River Foyle. Its Member of Parliament (MP) since the 2019 general election is Colum Eastwood of the SDLP. From 1983 to 2005, the seat was held by John Hume, a Nobel Peace Prize laureate.

== Constituency profile ==
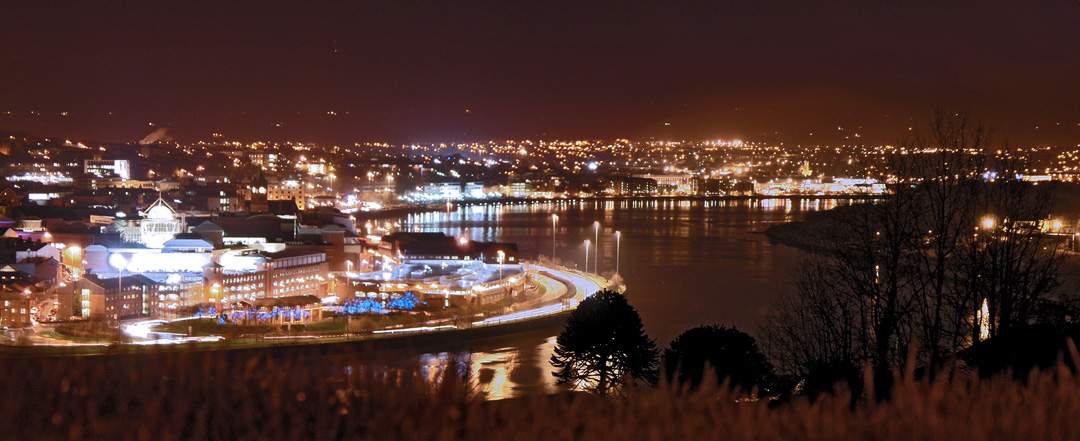
The River Foyle at night

The name comes from the River Foyle which the city of Derry lies, avoiding the names of Derry or Londonderry for the constituency and encompassing the areas of County Tyrone that were originally in the constituency. The seat is nationalist-leaning and residents' wealth is below average for the UK. The wards within the constituency are among the poorest in the UK with high unemployment, high welfare dependency and the lowest employment rate for Northern Ireland.

The seat was won by the SDLP on all but one occasion; in 2017 Sinn Féin gained the seat for the first time with the smallest majority in Northern Ireland of 169. In 2019 SDLP leader Colum Eastwood won the seat back with an 18% swing and a 17,000 majority.

== Boundaries ==
The seat was created in boundary changes in 1983, as part of an expansion of Northern Ireland's constituencies from 12 to 17, and was predominantly made from the old Londonderry constituency.

1983–1997: The district of Londonderry, and in the district of Strabane, the wards of Artigarvan, Dunnamannagh, East, North, Slievekirk, South, and West.

The local government district of Londonderry was renamed Derry on 7 May 1984.

1997–2010: The district of Derry (areas in Strabane transferred to West Tyrone).

2010–2024: In the district of Derry, the wards of Altnagelvin, Ballynashallog, Beechwood, Brandywell, Carn Hill, Caw, Clondermot, Creggan Central, Creggan South, Crevagh, Culmore, Ebrington, Eglinton, Enagh, Foyle Springs, Holly Mount, Kilfennan, Lisnagelvin, New Buildings, Pennyburn, Rosemount, Shantallow East, Shantallow West, Springtown, Strand, The Diamond, Victoria and Westland (transfer of Claudy and Banagher wards to East Londonderry).

2024–present: In the district of Derry City and Strabane, the wards of Ballymagroarty, Brandywell, Carn Hill, Caw, City Walls, Clondermot, Creggan, Creggan South, Culmore, Drumahoe, Ebrington, Enagh, Foyle Springs, Galliagh, Kilfennan, Lisnagelvin, Madam's Bank, New Buildings, Northland, Shantallow, Shantallow East, Sheriff's Mountain, Skeoge, Springtown, and Victoria (transfer of Eglinton to East Londonderry, and of Slievekirk to West Tyrone).

== History ==
At the seat's creation at the 1983 general election, SDLP leader John Hume won the new seat, becoming the party's only MP after it lost Belfast West to Sinn Féin. Hume retained the seat until his retirement at the 2005 general election, when he was succeeded by the SDLP's Mark Durkan.

Durkan retained the seat at the 2010 general election. This seat also gave the Alliance Party their worst share of the vote in Northern Ireland, polling just 0.6% of the votes. Durkan was re-elected to a third term at the 2015 general election, increasing his share of the vote to 47.9% and winning a majority of 6,046 votes.

In the 2016 referendum to leave the European Union, the constituency was estimated to have voted remain by 78.3%. This was the sixth highest support for remain for a constituency, and the highest support for remain in Northern Ireland.

In the 2017 general election, the seat was won by Elisha McCallion of Sinn Féin, who won with a majority of just 169 votes over Mark Durkan. Following the election, concerns about electoral malpractice were raised with the Electoral Office by the SDLP and People Before Profit's Eamonn McCann.

In the 2019 general election, the seat was recaptured by SDLP leader Colum Eastwood. Sinn Féin's vote share dropped from 39.7% in 2017 to 20.7% in 2019, the lowest percentage share that that party had won in any general election in the constituency since 1992.

== Members of Parliament ==
The constituency was previously represented by John Hume, former leader of the SDLP and recipient of the Nobel Peace Prize. Each of the SDLP MPs for Foyle served as party leader.

| Election | Member | Party |
|---|---|---|
| 1983 | John Hume | SDLP |
| 2005 | Mark Durkan | SDLP |
| 2017 | Elisha McCallion | Sinn Féin |
| 2019 | Colum Eastwood | SDLP |

== Elections ==
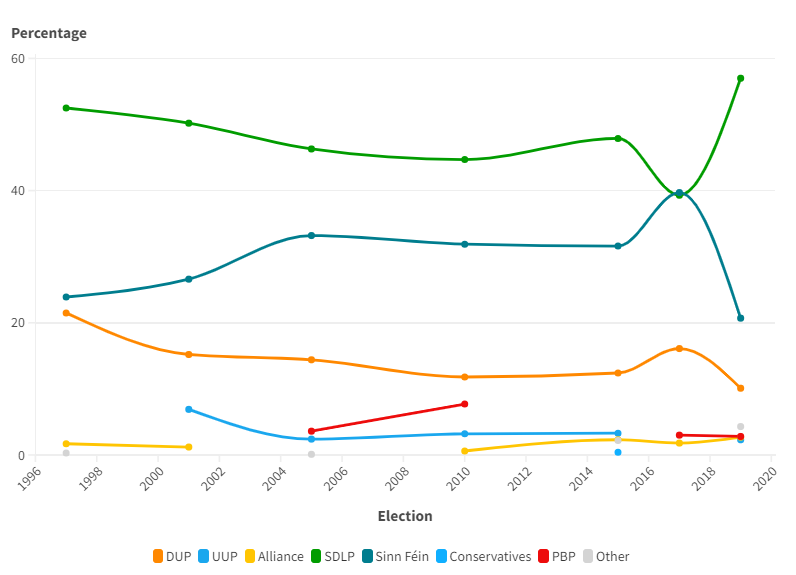

=== Elections in the 2020s ===
2024 general election: Foyle
| Party | Candidate | Votes | % | ±% |
|---|---|---|---|---|
| SDLP | Colum Eastwood | 15,647 | 40.8 | −17.4 |
| Sinn Féin | Sandra Duffy | 11,481 | 29.9 | +8.7 |
| DUP | Gary Middleton | 3,915 | 10.2 | +1.5 |
| People Before Profit | Shaun Harkin | 2,444 | 6.4 | +3.6 |
| Independent | Anne McCloskey | 1,519 | 4.0 | New |
| UUP | Janice Montgomery | 1,422 | 3.7 | +1.7 |
| Alliance | Rachael Ferguson | 1,268 | 3.3 | +0.6 |
| Aontú | John Boyle | 662 | 1.7 | −2.7 |
| Majority | | 4,166 | 10.9 | −25.4 |
| Turnout | | 38,358 | 52.2 | −11.2 |
| Registered electors | | 73,496 | | |
| SDLP hold | | Swing | −13.1 | |

=== Elections in the 2010s ===
2019 general election: Foyle
| Party | Candidate | Votes | % | ±% |
|---|---|---|---|---|
| SDLP | Colum Eastwood | 26,881 | 57.0 | +17.7 |
| Sinn Féin | Elisha McCallion | 9,771 | 20.7 | −19.0 |
| DUP | Gary Middleton | 4,773 | 10.1 | −6.0 |
| Aontú | Anne McCloskey | 2,032 | 4.3 | New |
| People Before Profit | Shaun Harkin | 1,332 | 2.8 | −0.2 |
| Alliance | Rachael Ferguson | 1,267 | 2.7 | +0.9 |
| UUP | Darren Guy | 1,088 | 2.3 | New |
| Majority | | 17,110 | 36.3 | N/A |
| Turnout | | 47,144 | 63.4 | −2.0 |
| Registered electors | | 74,360 | | |
| SDLP gain from Sinn Féin | | Swing | +18.4 | |

This seat saw the largest decrease in vote share for Sinn Féin at the 2019 general election.

2017 general election: Foyle
| Party | Candidate | Votes | % | ±% |
|---|---|---|---|---|
| Sinn Féin | Elisha McCallion | 18,256 | 39.7 | +8.1 |
| SDLP | Mark Durkan | 18,087 | 39.3 | −8.6 |
| DUP | Gary Middleton | 7,398 | 16.1 | +3.7 |
| People Before Profit | Shaun Harkin | 1,377 | 3.0 | New |
| Alliance | John Doherty | 847 | 1.8 | −0.5 |
| Majority | | 169 | 0.4 | N/A |
| Turnout | | 46,136 | 65.4 | +12.6 |
| Registered electors | | 70,324 | | |
| Sinn Féin gain from SDLP | | Swing | +8.3 | |

2015 general election: Foyle
| Party | Candidate | Votes | % | ±% |
|---|---|---|---|---|
| SDLP | Mark Durkan | 17,725 | 47.9 | +3.2 |
| Sinn Féin | Gearóid Ó hEeára | 11,679 | 31.6 | −0.3 |
| DUP | Gary Middleton | 4,573 | 12.4 | +0.6 |
| UUP | Julia Kee | 1,226 | 3.3 | +0.1 |
| Alliance | David Hawthorne | 835 | 2.3 | +1.7 |
| UKIP | Kyle Thompson | 832 | 2.2 | New |
| NI Conservatives | Hamish Badenoch | 132 | 0.4 | New |
| Majority | | 6,046 | 16.3 | +3.5 |
| Turnout | | 37,002 | 52.8 | −4.7 |
| Registered electors | | 70,036 | | |
| SDLP hold | | Swing | +1.8 | |

2010 general election: Foyle
| Party | Candidate | Votes | % | ±% |
|---|---|---|---|---|
| SDLP | Mark Durkan | 16,922 | 44.7 | −1.7 |
| Sinn Féin | Martina Anderson | 12,098 | 31.9 | −1.4 |
| DUP | Maurice Devenney | 4,489 | 11.8 | −2.2 |
| People Before Profit | Eamonn McCann | 2,936 | 7.7 | New |
| UCU-NF | David Harding | 1,221 | 3.2 | +0.9 |
| Alliance | Keith McGrellis | 223 | 0.6 | New |
| Majority | | 4,824 | 12.8 | −0.3 |
| Turnout | | 37,889 | 57.5 | −12.5 |
| Registered electors | | 65,843 | | |
| SDLP hold | | Swing | −0.2 | |

=== Elections in the 2000s ===
2005 general election: Foyle
| Party | Candidate | Votes | % | ±% |
|---|---|---|---|---|
| SDLP | Mark Durkan | 21,119 | 46.3 | −3.9 |
| Sinn Féin | Mitchel McLaughlin | 15,162 | 33.2 | +6.6 |
| DUP | William Hay | 6,557 | 14.4 | −0.8 |
| Socialist Environmental | Eamonn McCann | 1,649 | 3.6 | New |
| UUP | Earl Storey | 1,091 | 2.4 | −4.5 |
| Rainbow Dream Ticket | Ben Reel | 31 | 0.1 | New |
| Majority | | 5,957 | 13.1 | −10.5 |
| Turnout | | 45,609 | 65.9 | −3.0 |
| Registered electors | | 68,758 | | |
| SDLP hold | | Swing | −5.3 | |

2001 general election: Foyle
| Party | Candidate | Votes | % | ±% |
|---|---|---|---|---|
| SDLP | John Hume | 24,538 | 50.2 | −2.3 |
| Sinn Féin | Mitchel McLaughlin | 12,988 | 26.6 | +2.7 |
| DUP | William Hay | 7,414 | 15.2 | −6.3 |
| UUP | Andrew Davidson | 3,360 | 6.9 | New |
| Alliance | Colm Cavanagh | 579 | 1.2 | −0.5 |
| Majority | | 11,550 | 23.6 | −5.0 |
| Turnout | | 48,879 | 68.9 | −1.5 |
| Registered electors | | 70,943 | | |
| SDLP hold | | Swing | −2.5 | |

=== Elections in the 1990s ===
1997 general election: Foyle
| Party | Candidate | Votes | % | ±% |
|---|---|---|---|---|
| SDLP | John Hume | 25,109 | 52.5 | +1.0 |
| Sinn Féin | Mitchel McLaughlin | 11,445 | 23.9 | +6.3 |
| DUP | William Hay | 10,290 | 21.5 | −4.9 |
| Alliance | Helen-Marie Bell | 817 | 1.7 | −1.0 |
| Natural Law | Donn Brennan | 154 | 0.3 | −0.5 |
| Majority | | 13,664 | 28.6 | +3.5 |
| Turnout | | 47,815 | 70.4 | +0.9 |
| Registered electors | | 67,905 | | |
| SDLP hold | | Swing | −4.0 | |

1992 general election: Foyle
| Party | Candidate | Votes | % | ±% |
|---|---|---|---|---|
| SDLP | John Hume | 26,710 | 51.5 | +2.7 |
| DUP | Gregory Lloyd Campbell | 13,705 | 26.4 | −2.2 |
| Sinn Féin | Martin McGuinness | 9,149 | 17.6 | −0.3 |
| Alliance | Lara McIlroy | 1,390 | 2.7 | +0.1 |
| Workers' Party | Gordon McKenzie | 514 | 1.0 | −1.1 |
| Natural Law | John Burns | 422 | 0.8 | New |
| Majority | | 13,005 | 25.1 | +4.9 |
| Turnout | | 51,890 | 69.5 | +0.5 |
| Registered electors | | 74,673 | | |
| SDLP hold | | Swing | +2.5 | |

=== Elections in the 1980s ===
1987 general election: Foyle
| Party | Candidate | Votes | % | ±% |
|---|---|---|---|---|
| SDLP | John Hume | 23,743 | 48.8 | +2.8 |
| DUP | Gregory Lloyd Campbell | 13,883 | 28.6 | −1.9 |
| Sinn Féin | Martin McGuinness | 8,707 | 17.9 | −2.4 |
| Alliance | Elizabeth Zammitt | 1,276 | 2.6 | +0.5 |
| Workers' Party | Eamonn Melaugh | 1,022 | 2.1 | +1.0 |
| Majority | | 9,860 | 20.2 | +4.7 |
| Turnout | | 48,631 | 69.0 | −8.6 |
| Registered electors | | 70,519 | | |
| SDLP hold | | Swing | +2.4 | |

1983 general election: Foyle
| Party | Candidate | Votes | % | ±% |
|---|---|---|---|---|
| SDLP | John Hume | 24,071 | 46.0 | |
| DUP | Gregory Lloyd Campbell | 15,923 | 30.5 | |
| Sinn Féin | Martin McGuinness | 10,607 | 20.3 | |
| Alliance | Gerard O'Grady | 1,108 | 2.1 | |
| Workers' Party | Eamonn Melaugh | 582 | 1.1 | |
| Majority | | 8,148 | 15.5 | |
| Turnout | | 52,291 | 77.6 | |
| Registered electors | | 66,976 | | |
| SDLP win (new seat) | | | | |

== See also ==
- Londonderry City: a borough constituency in the UK parliament from 1801 to 1922.
- Foyle and City of Londonderry: neighbouring constituencies in the Northern Ireland Parliament from 1929 to 1973.
