= Eamon Melaugh =

Irish political activist (1933–2025)

Eamon Melaugh (4 July 1933 – 8 December 2025) was an Irish socialist, political campaigner and activist from Derry, Northern Ireland.

== Life and career ==
Melaugh helped found the Derry Housing Action Committee (DHAC) and the Derry Unemployment Action Committee (DUAC) which campaigned for jobs and housing for Derry Catholics.

Melaugh and the DHAC became involved with the Northern Ireland Civil Rights Association in the late 1960s. He later contributed evidence to the Bloody Sunday Inquiry. He was an active member of the Workers' Party, and stood as a candidate for it and its predecessor, Republican Clubs/Official Sinn Féin, in the Foyle constituency.

In 1956, he married Mary McLaughlin; the couple had 11 children, four daughters and seven sons. One of his sons, Martin Melaugh, is an academic who curates the University of Ulster's CAIN, a collection of information and source material on "the Troubles" and politics in Northern Ireland. His nephew is writer, broadcaster, and comedian Andrew Doyle. Melaugh died on 8 December 2025, at the age of 92.
