= Pat Ramsey =

Northern Ireland politician (born 1958)

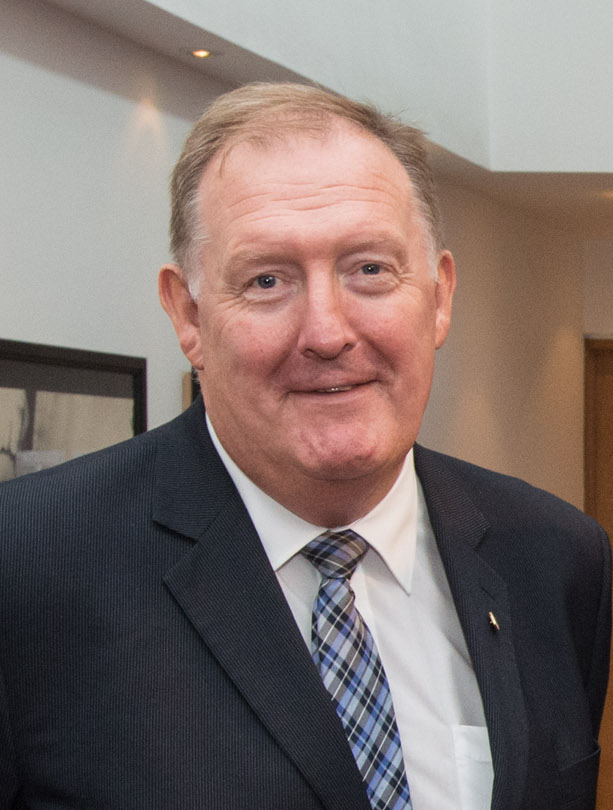

Member of the Legislative Assembly for Foyle
- In office 26 November 2003 – 31 December 2015
- Preceded by: John Tierney
- Succeeded by: Gerard Diver

Personal details
- Born: 4 November 1958 (age 67) Derry, Northern Ireland
- Party: SDLP
- Spouse: Chris Ramsey
- Children: 3 children; 1 son and 2 daughters: Patrick, Michelle and Aine.
- Website: Official website

Pat Ramsey is a retired Social Democratic and Labour Party (SDLP) politician from Derry, Northern Ireland. He is a former Mayor of Derry, and was a Member of the Northern Ireland Assembly (MLA) for Foyle from 2003 to 2015, when he stood down. He is the current SDLP Spokesperson for Employment and Learning, and is Chief Whip of the Party. He is a member of several All-Party Groups, such as Diabetes, Learning Disability, and Pro-life.

He has been subject to numerous attacks on his home in the Bogside and his young daughter was injured in an attack on his office. The attackers were reported to be dissident republicans.

Civic offices
Preceded by Joe Millar	Mayor of Derry; 1999–2000	Succeeded by Cathal Crumley
Northern Ireland Assembly
Preceded by John Tierney	MLA for Foyle; 2003–2015	Succeeded by Gerard Diver
