= Willie Hay, Baron Hay of Ballyore =

Northern Ireland politician (born 1950)

The Right Honourable The Lord Hay of Ballyore
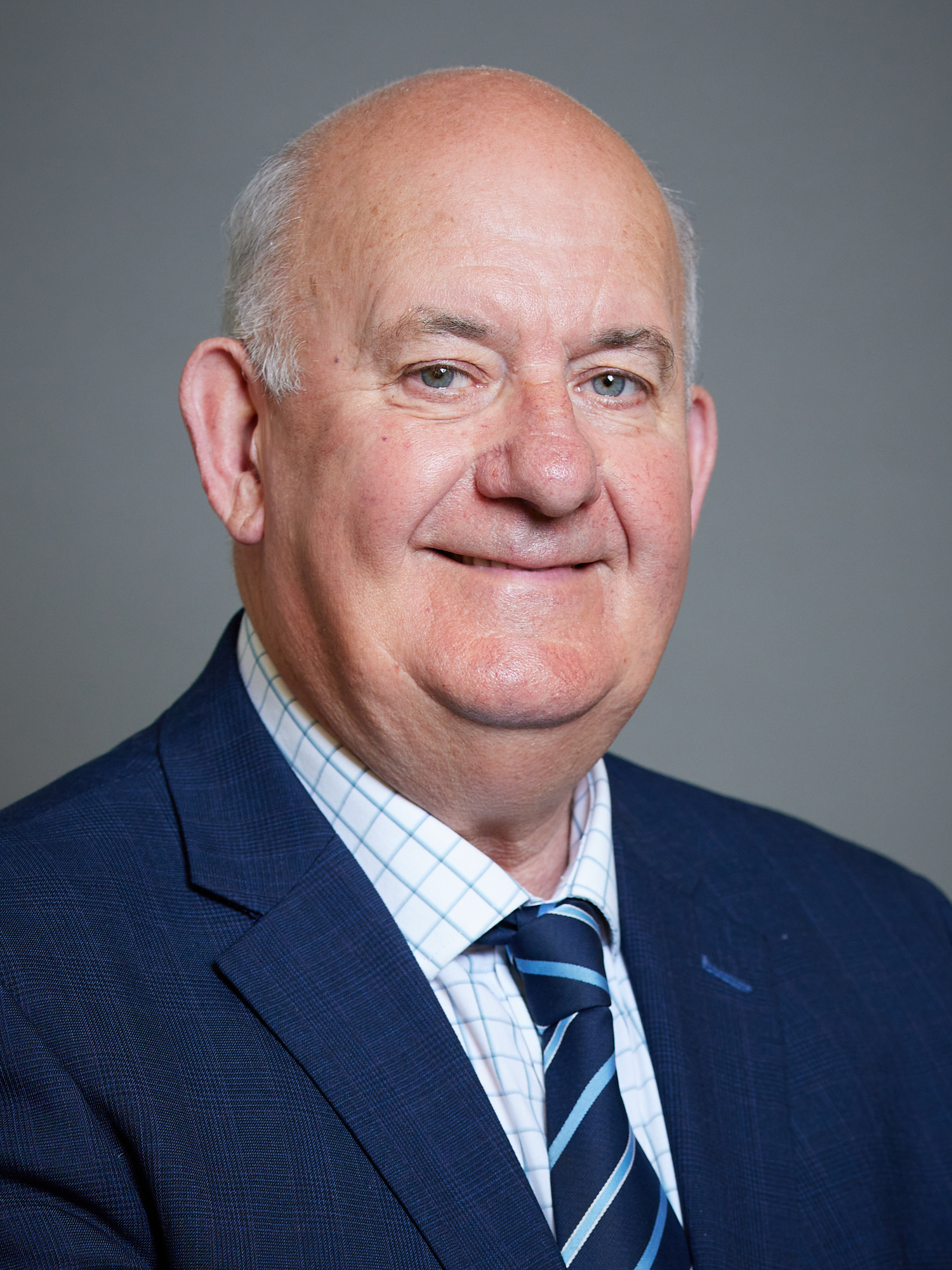
- Official portrait, 2022

Member of the House of Lords
- Lord Temporal
- Life peerage 16 December 2014

Speaker of the Northern Ireland Assembly
- In office 8 May 2007 – 13 October 2014
- Deputy: David McClarty; Francie Molloy; John Dallat; Roy Beggs Jr; Mitchel McLaughlin
- Preceded by: Eileen Bell
- Succeeded by: Mitchel McLaughlin

Member of the Legislative Assembly for Foyle
- In office 25 June 1998 – 13 October 2014
- Preceded by: Constituency created
- Succeeded by: Maurice Devenney

Mayor of Derry
- In office 1993–1994
- Preceded by: Mary Bradley
- Succeeded by: Annie Courtney

Deputy mayor of Derry
- In office 1992–1993

Member of Derry City Council
- In office 15 May 1985 – 5 May 2011
- Preceded by: District established
- Succeeded by: Gary Middleton
- Constituency: Rural
- In office 20 May 1981 – 15 May 1985
- Preceded by: Thomas Craig
- Succeeded by: District abolished
- Constituency: Londonderry Area A

Personal details
- Born: 16 April 1950 (age 76) Milford, County Donegal, Republic of Ireland
- Party: Democratic Unionist Party
- Spouse(s): Doris, Lady Hay of Ballyore (née McMorris)

William Alexander Hay, Baron Hay of Ballyore (born 16 April 1950), is a Democratic Unionist Party (DUP) politician, serving as a life peer in the House of Lords since 2014.

Hay served as Speaker of the Northern Ireland Assembly from 2007 to 2014, as well as a Member of the Northern Ireland Assembly (MLA) for Foyle from 1998 to 2014.

He attended Faughan Valley High School, Drumahoe, County Londonderry. An Irish citizen by birth, he has objected to previously not being deemed automatically eligible for British nationality. This policy is due to be changed in 2024.

== Political career ==
Hay was elected to Londonderry City Council in Northern Ireland in 1981 for the Democratic Unionist Party. He served as Mayor in 1993 and Deputy Mayor in 1992. In 1996 he was an unsuccessful candidate in the Northern Ireland Forum election in Foyle., but was elected to the Northern Ireland Assembly in 1998. He is a member of the Northern Ireland Housing Council and the Londonderry Port and Harbour Commission. and in 2001 became a member of the Northern Ireland Policing Board.

Hay was elected Speaker of the Northern Ireland Assembly on 8 May 2007 following the restoration of devolution. He also is a prominent member of the Orange Order and Apprentice Boys of Derry.

On 6 October 2014, Hay announced his retirement from the Northern Ireland Assembly as both MLA and Speaker. The role of the Speaker had been taken on by Mitchel McLaughlin in a temporary capacity in September 2014 because of Hay's ill health. However, in a letter read to the Assembly, he announced his retirement from the Assembly effective from 13 October 2014 in order to concentrate on returning to good health.

In August 2014, it was announced that he would get a life peerage to sit in the House of Lords and he opted to sit there as a crossbencher, despite being nominated by DUP. Hay was ennobled on 16 December 2014 and took the title Baron Hay of Ballyore, of Ballyore in the City of Londonderry. He subsequently sat as a DUP member.

== Nationality ==
Hay was born in Milford in the north of County Donegal in the north-west of Ulster in 1950. County Donegal, the largest county in Ulster, is one of the three counties in Ulster that is part of the Republic of Ireland; the other six counties in Ulster make up Northern Ireland. At the age of six, Hay moved with his family to Derry. He is an Irish citizen with an Irish passport because he refuses to pay a £1,300 UK naturalisation fee (and take the "Life in the UK" test) required for people, such as him, who were born in the Republic of Ireland but who wish to become a British citizen. "I see myself as a British citizen living in Northern Ireland all my life. I have a right to British citizenship and a British passport. I am being discriminated against because I can't get my British passport," he told the Northern Ireland Affairs Committee at Westminster in April 2021. In January 2024, a Private Members Bill brought forward by Gavin Robinson passed, allowing people born in the Republic of Ireland after 1948 that have been living in Northern Ireland for longer than 5 years to register as British citizens. It is not known when the bill will become law.

== See also ==
- British nationality law
  - British nationality law and the Republic of Ireland
- Irish nationality law

Civic offices
Preceded by Mary Bradley	Mayor of Derry; 1992–1993	Succeeded by Annie Courtney
Political offices
Preceded by Eileen Bell	Speaker of the Northern Ireland Assembly; 2007–2014	Succeeded by Mitchel McLaughlin
Northern Ireland Assembly
New assembly	Assembly Member for Foyle; 1998–2014	Succeeded by Maurice Devenney
Orders of precedence in the United Kingdom
Preceded by The Lord Lisvane	Gentlemen; Baron Haye of Ballyore	Followed by The Lord Dunlop
