= Northern Ireland Assembly constituencies =

Northern Ireland Assembly electoral districts

- Map of the 18 constituencies of the Northern Ireland Assembly from 2011 to 2027
- Category: Electoral district
- Location: Northern Ireland
- Created: 1998
- Number: 18
- Government: Northern Ireland Executive

The Northern Ireland Assembly constituencies are the electoral districts used to elect Members of the Legislative Assembly (MLA) to the Northern Ireland Assembly. Each of the 18 constituencies elects five members, for a total of 90 members. The constituencies are not used for local government.

They usually have the same borders as the single-member parliamentary constituencies in Northern Ireland used for elections to the House of Commons.

== History ==
There are 18 constituencies: four borough constituencies (for Belfast) and 14 county constituencies elsewhere (see below).

Each elects five MLAs by means of the single transferable vote system. Six MLAs were returned per constituency until the Assembly Members (Reduction of Numbers) Act (Northern Ireland) 2016 reduced the number to five, effective from the 2017 Assembly election.

Assembly constituency boundaries are usually identical to their House of Commons equivalents, with the exception of from 2010–11 and from 2024–27 due to the Fifth periodic review of Westminster constituencies and 2023 review of Westminster constituencies being implemented on a different timeline for each body.

=== 1998–2011 boundaries ===
Name
1. Belfast East BC
2. Belfast North BC
3. Belfast South BC
4. Belfast West BC
5. East Antrim CC
6. East Londonderry CC
7. Fermanagh & South Tyrone CC
8. Foyle CC
9. Lagan Valley CC
Map

Parliamentary constituencies in Northern Ireland

Name
10. Mid Ulster CC
11. Newry & Armagh CC
12. North Antrim CC
13. North Down CC
14. South Antrim CC
15. South Down CC
16. Strangford CC
17. Upper Bann CC
18. West Tyrone CC

== Historical representation by party ==
Alliance Party Democratic Unionist Party Green Party Independent Independent Unionist Northern Ireland Women's Coalition People Before Profit Progressive Unionist Party Sinn Féin Social Democratic and Labour Party Ulster Unionist Party Traditional Unionist Voice

Constituency	Members																												
Constituency	1998	'99	'00	'01	'02	2003	'04	'05	'06	2007	'08	'09	'10	2011	'12	'13	'14	'15	2016	2017	'18	'19	'20	'21	2022	'23	'24	'25	'26
Belfast East	John Alderdice (All.)					Naomi Long (All.)							Chris Lyttle (All.)												Peter McReynolds (All.)				
Belfast East	David Ervine (PUP)									Dawn Purvis (PUP)				Judith Cochrane (All.)					Naomi Long			MH	Naomi Long (All.)						
Belfast East	Reg Empey (UUP)													Michael Copeland				Andy Allen (UUP)											
Belfast East	Peter Robinson (DUP)																		Joanne Bunting (DUP)										
Belfast East	Sammy Wilson (DUP)					Robin Newton (DUP)																			David Brooks (DUP)				
Belfast East	Ian Adamson (UUP)					Michael Copeland				Wallace Browne				Sammy Douglas (DUP)															
Belfast North	Gerry Kelly (SF)																												
Belfast North	Billy Hutchinson (PUP)					Kathy Stanton (SF)				Carál Ní Chuilín (SF)																			
Belfast North	Alban Maginness (SDLP)																		Nichola Mallon (SDLP)						Nuala McAllister (All.)				
Belfast North	Fred Cobain (UUP)													Paula Bradley (DUP)											Phillip Brett (DUP)				
Belfast North	Nigel Dodds (DUP)												William Humphrey (DUP)												Brian Kingston (DUP)				
Belfast North	Fraser Agnew (Ind. U)					Nelson McCausland (DUP)																							
Belfast South	M. McWilliams (NIWC)					Alex Maskey (SF)											Máirtín Ó Muilleoir (SF)						Deirdre Hargey (SF)						
Belfast South	Alasdair McDonnell (SDLP)																	Claire Hanna (SDLP)					Matthew O'Toole (SDLP)						
Belfast South	Carmel Hanna (SDLP)												C. McDevitt			F. McKinney			Clare Bailey (Green)						Kate Nicholl (All.)				
Belfast South	Esmond Birnie (UUP)									Anna Lo (All.)									Paula Bradshaw (All.)										
Belfast South	Michael McGimpsey (UUP)																		Christopher Stalford (DUP)						Edwin Poots (DUP)				
Belfast South	Mark Robinson (DUP)									Jimmy Spratt (DUP)								E. L-P											
Belfast West	Gerry Adams (SF)												Pat Sheehan (SF)																
Belfast West	Alex Maskey (SF)					Fra McCann (SF)																		Aisling Reilly (SF)					
Belfast West	Bairbre de Brún (SF)						Sue Ramsey (SF)										Alex Maskey (SF)								Danny Baker (SF)				
Belfast West	Sue Ramsey (SF)					M. Ferguson (SF)				Jennifer McCann (SF)									Órlaithí Flynn (SF)										
Belfast West	Joe Hendron (SDLP)					D. Dodds (DUP)				Paul Maskey (SF)					R. McCorley (SF)				Gerry Carroll (PBP)										
Belfast West	Alex Attwood (SDLP)																												
	1998	'99	'00	'01	'02	2003	'04	'05	'06	2007	'08	'09	'10	2011	'12	'13	'14	'15	2016	2017	'18	'19	'20	'21	2022	'23	'24	'25	'26
East Antrim	Seán Neeson (All.)													Stewart Dickson (All.)															
East Antrim	Roy Beggs Jr (UUP)																								Danny Donnelly (All.)				
East Antrim	Ken Robinson (UUP)													Oliver McMullan (SF)						John Stewart (UUP)									
East Antrim	D. O'Connor (SDLP)					Sammy Wilson (DUP)												Gordon Lyons (DUP)											
East Antrim	David Hilditch (DUP)																									C. Brownlee			
East Antrim	Roger Hutchinson (Note: UK Unionist Party 1998–99; Northern Ireland Unionist Party 1999; Independent Unionist 1999–2000; Democratic Unionist Party 2000–2003; Independent Unionist 2003)					G. Dawson (DUP)				Alastair Ross (DUP)																			
East Londonderry	A. Doherty (SDLP)				MC	Francis Brolly (SF)							BL	Cathal Ó hOisín (SF)					Caoimhe Archibald (SF)										
East Londonderry	John Dallat (SDLP)																		GM	Dallat (SDLP)			Cara Hunter (SDLP)						
East Londonderry	David McClarty (UUP)													(Ind. U)			Claire Sugden (Ind. U)												
East Londonderry	Boyd Douglas (Ind. U)					George Robinson (DUP)																			Alan Robinson (DUP)				
East Londonderry	Gregory Campbell (DUP)																		Maurice Bradley (DUP)										
East Londonderry	Pauline Armitage (UUP)					N. Hillis (UUP)				Adrian McQuillan (DUP)																			
Fermanagh and South Tyrone	Michelle Gildernew (SF)														B. McGahan (SF)				MG	Colm Gildernew (SF)									
Fermanagh and South Tyrone	Gerry McHugh (SF)					Tom O'Reilly (SF)				G. McHugh (SF)				Seán Lynch (SF)										Áine Murphy (SF)					
Fermanagh and South Tyrone	Tommy Gallagher (SDLP)													Phil Flanagan (SF)					RM	Jemma Dolan (SF)									
Fermanagh and South Tyrone	David McClarty (UUP)					Arlene Foster				Arlene Foster (DUP)														Deborah Erskine (DUP)					
Fermanagh and South Tyrone	Sam Foster (UUP)					Tom Elliott (UUP)												NS	AP	Rosemary Barton (UUP)					T. Elliott		Armstrong		
Fermanagh and South Tyrone	Maurice Morrow (DUP)																												
Foyle
Lagan Valley
	1998	'99	'00	'01	'02	2003	'04	'05	'06	2007	'08	'09	'10	2011	'12	'13	'14	'15	2016	2017	'18	'19	'20	'21	2022	'23	'24	'25	'26
Mid Ulster
Newry and Armagh
North Antrim
North Down
South Antrim
South Down
Strangford
Upper Bann
West Tyrone

== See also ==
- Boundary Commission for Northern Ireland
- Senedd constituencies
- Scottish Parliament constituencies and electoral regions
