= Michael McGimpsey =

British politician

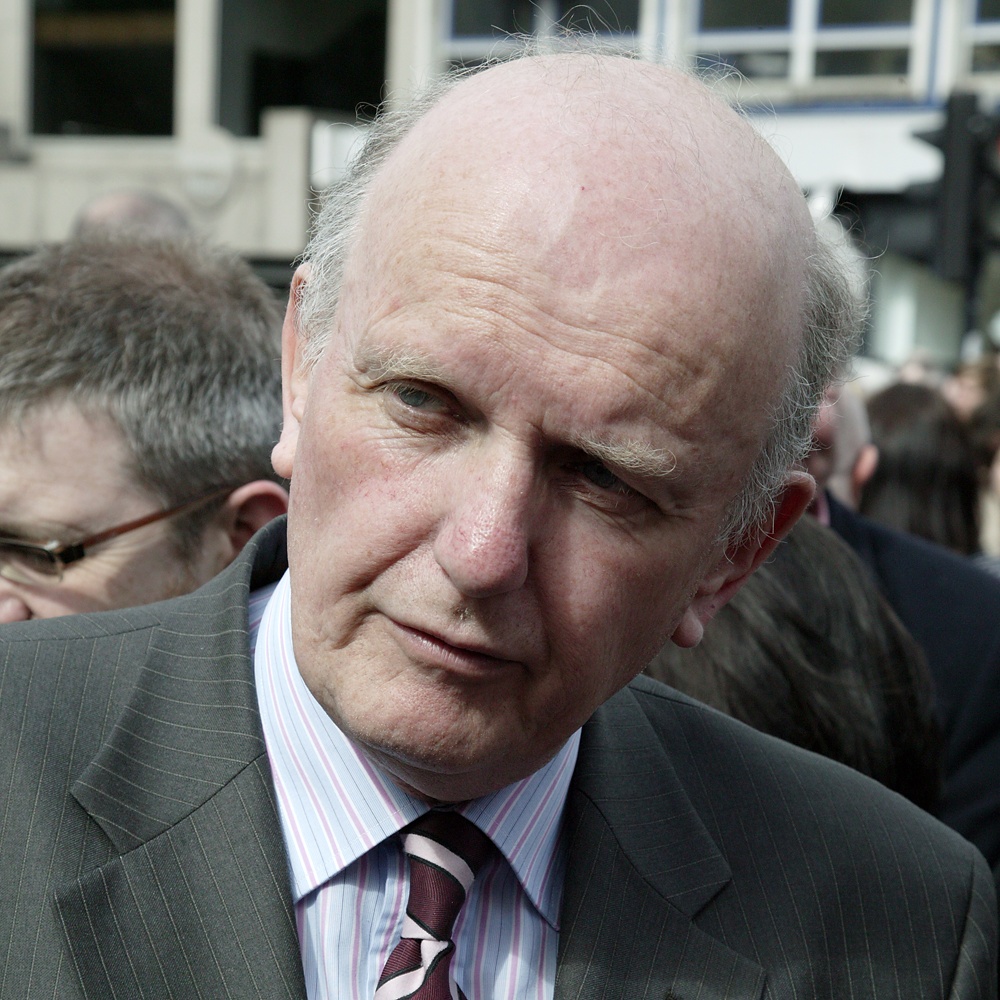
- Michael McGimpsey at a 2011 rally for the murdered police officer Ronan Kerr

Minister of Health, Social Services and Public Safety
- In office 8 May 2007 – 16 May 2011
- First Minister: Peter Robinson
- Preceded by: Office suspended Last incumbent: Bairbre de Brún
- Succeeded by: Edwin Poots

Member of the Northern Ireland Assembly for Belfast, South
- In office 25 June 1998 – 7 May 2016
- Preceded by: New Creation
- Succeeded by: Christopher Stalford

Member of Belfast City Council
- In office 19 May 1993 – 5 May 2011
- Preceded by: Dixie Gilmore
- Succeeded by: Catherine Curran
- Constituency: Laganbank

Personal details
- Born: 1 June 1948 (age 78) Donaghadee, Northern Ireland
- Party: Ulster Unionist Party
- Spouse: Maureen McGimpsey
- Children: 2
- Education: Trinity College, Dublin
- Profession: Businessman

Michael McGimpsey (born 1 July 1948) is a former Ulster Unionist Party (UUP) politician who was a Member of the Northern Ireland Assembly (MLA) for Belfast South from 1998 to 2016.

== Background ==
=== Early life and career outside of politics ===
McGimpsey was born in Donaghadee, County Down and was educated in Regent House Grammar School and Trinity College, Dublin. He is a businessman aside from politics involved in property development, hotels and the hospitality sector. In the mid-1980s he came to prominence alongside his brother Christopher when they challenged the Anglo-Irish Agreement by bringing a suit against the Irish government in the High Court of the Republic of Ireland, arguing that the Agreement was invalid because it contradicted Articles 2 and 3 of the Constitution of Ireland (this argument was unusual coming from Unionists because of the traditional Unionist opposition to these two articles.) The case failed in the High Court, and again on appeal to the Supreme Court.

=== Early political career ===
In 1993 he was first elected to Belfast City Council. For the 1996 Northern Ireland Forum election McGimpsey was third on the UUP list. As a result, he was not involved in the negotiations for the Belfast Agreement. In 1998 McGimpsey was the first member to be elected for South Belfast on the 5th count. to the Northern Ireland Assembly. He was appointed to serve as Minister of Culture, Arts and Leisure in the Northern Ireland Executive from 1999 until the collapse of the Executive in 2002. Under his ministry the Ulster Covenant was digitised by the Public Records Office of Northern Ireland.

== Westminster elections ==
=== 2001 ===
In the run-up to the 2001 UK general election McGimpsey challenged sitting MP Martin Smyth for the Ulster Unionist nomination for Belfast South and gained 43% of the valid poll. In light of anti-agreement Smyth's selection the then anti-agreement Democratic Unionist Party (DUP) did not stand a candidate, but the pro-agreement Progressive Unionist Party was prompted to put one up. McGimpsey, however endorsed Smyth.

=== 2005 ===
In 2005 the sitting UUP MP Martin Smyth retired and McGimpsey was selected as the official UUP candidate for the south Belfast constituency in the 2005 general election following a close selection campaign against an unknown figure, Christopher Montgomery. The Democratic Unionist Party, for the first time in over twenty years, stood a candidate in the form of former policeman Jimmy Spratt. In the battle between the two Unionist parties, both Smyth and former Ulster Unionist leader James Molyneaux appeared in a photograph with Jimmy Spratt which was included in his election literature. While Smyth subsequently claimed that this was "just a photo" that did not constitute an endorsement, "two Ulster Unionists had let it be known in the most public fashion that they preferred an unknown DUP candidate to the man selected by their own party". When the results were declared the poll was split three ways, with Social Democratic and Labour Party politician and part-time GP, Alasdair McDonnell winning the seat. Such an eventuality had been anticipated before the election in discussions between the UUP and DUP about an election pact involving Fermanagh and South Tyrone and Belfast South amongst other constituencies. David Burnside is known to have favoured the pact benefiting Tom Elliott, as he felt that Elliott could unite Unionists in Fermanagh and South Tyrone more readily than McGimpsey could in South Belfast.

=== 2010 ===
In December 2009, McGimpsey ruled himself out from standing in South Belfast in the 2010 General Election, saying that he felt he would best serve his constituents by continuing to work as Minister for Health.

== 2007 Assembly election ==
In the Assembly election of March 2007 McGimpsey retained his seat but the UUP's vote in South Belfast fell from 27.0% in 2003 to 18.4% of the popular vote in 2007, which resulted in the party losing its second seat, originally held by Esmond Birnie, which was picked up by Anna Lo of the Alliance Party

== Ulster Unionist Party ==
McGimpsey was politically close to David Trimble and at once talked of as a future leader of the Ulster Unionist Party, however he has never been a potential or actual challenger to a UUP leadership election. Politically McGimpsey is seen as being on the left of the Ulster Unionists and is a member of the Unionist Labour Group.

Northern Ireland Assembly
New assembly	MLA for Belfast, South; 1998–2016	Succeeded by Christopher Stalford
Political offices
New office	Minister of Culture, Arts and Leisure; 1999–2000	Vacant Office suspended Title next held by self
Vacant Office suspended Title last held by self	Minister of Culture, Arts and Leisure; 2000–2002	Vacant Office suspended Title next held by Edwin Poots
Vacant Office suspended Title last held by Bairbre de Brún	Minister of Health, Social Services and Public Safety; 2007–2011	Succeeded by Edwin Poots
