= Northern Ireland (European Parliament constituency) =

Former European Parliament constituency

- European Parliament constituency
- Location among the 2014 constituencies
- Member state: United Kingdom
- Created: 1979
- Dissolved: 31 January 2020
- MEPs: 3

Northern Ireland (Irish: Tuaisceart Éireann [ˈt̪ˠuəʃcəɾˠt̪ˠ ˈeːɾʲən̪ˠ]; Ulster-Scots: Norlin Airlann) was a constituency of the European Parliament from 1979 until the UK exit from the European Union on 31 January 2020. It elected three MEPs using the single transferable vote, making it the only constituency in the United Kingdom which did not use first-past-the-post or party-list proportional representation.

== Boundaries ==
The constituency covered the entirety of Northern Ireland, a constituent country of the United Kingdom. It was the only constituency in the United Kingdom the boundaries of which remained unchanged from the first direct election in 1979 until the UK left the European Union in 2020.

== Members of the European Parliament ==
| Year | Member | Party | Member | Party | Member | Party |
|---|---|---|---|---|---|---|
| 1979 | Ian Paisley | Democratic Unionist | John Hume | SDLP | John Taylor | Ulster Unionist |
| 1984 | Ian Paisley | Democratic Unionist | John Hume | SDLP | John Taylor | Ulster Unionist |
| 1989 | Ian Paisley | Democratic Unionist | John Hume | SDLP | Jim Nicholson | Ulster Unionist |
| 1994 | Ian Paisley | Democratic Unionist | John Hume | SDLP | Jim Nicholson | Ulster Unionist |
| 1999 | Ian Paisley | Democratic Unionist | John Hume | SDLP | Jim Nicholson | Ulster Unionist |
| 2004 | Jim Allister | Democratic Unionist | Bairbre de Brún | Sinn Féin | Jim Nicholson | Ulster Unionist |
| 2007 | Jim Allister | Traditional Unionist Voice | Bairbre de Brún | Sinn Féin | Jim Nicholson | Ulster Unionist |
| 2009 | Diane Dodds | Democratic Unionist | Bairbre de Brún | Sinn Féin | Jim Nicholson | Conservatives and Unionists |
| 2012 | Diane Dodds | Democratic Unionist | Martina Anderson | Sinn Féin | Jim Nicholson | Ulster Unionist |
| 2014 | Diane Dodds | Democratic Unionist | Martina Anderson | Sinn Féin | Jim Nicholson | Ulster Unionist |
| 2019 | Diane Dodds | Democratic Unionist | Martina Anderson | Sinn Féin | Naomi Long | Alliance |

Note: The columns in this table are used only for presentational purposes, and no significance should be attached to the order of columns. For details of the order in which seats were won at each election, see the detailed results of that election.

== Elections ==
=== 2019 ===
2019 European Parliament election: Northern Ireland
| Party | Candidate | FPv% | Count | | | | |
| Party | Candidate | FPv% | 1 | 2 | 3 | 4 | 5 |
|---|---|---|---|---|---|---|---|
| Sinn Féin | Martina Anderson | 22.17 | 126,951 | 128,117 | 128,190 | 128,200.50 | 152,436.50 |
| DUP | Diane Dodds | 21.83 | 124,991 | 127,291 | 155,422 | | |
| Alliance | Naomi Long | 18.50 | 105,928 | 115,327 | 122,263 | 123,917.00 | 170,370.00 |
| SDLP | Colum Eastwood | 13.72 | 78,589 | 80,949 | 82,101 | 82,413.50 | |
| TUV | Jim Allister | 10.83 | 62,021 | 63,872 | 79,540 | 89,854.00 | 90,079.00 |
| UUP | Danny Kennedy | 9.26 | 53,052 | 54,736 | | | |
| Green (NI) | Clare Bailey | 2.18 | 12,471 | | | | |
| UKIP | Robert Hill | 0.89 | 5,115 | | | | |
| Independent | Jane Morrice | 0.30 | 1,719 | | | | |
| Independent | Neil McCann | 0.17 | 948 | | | | |
| NI Conservatives | Amandeep Singh Bhogal | 0.12 | 662 | | | | |
Electorate: 1,278,951 Valid: 572,447 Spoilt: 4,649 (0.81%) Quota: 143,112 Turnout: 577,275 (45.14%)

=== 2014 ===
Ten candidates stood in the election.

2014 European Parliament election: Northern Ireland
| Party | Candidate | FPv% | Count | | | | | | | |
| Party | Candidate | FPv% | 1 | 2 | 3 | 4 | 5 | 6 | 7 | 8 |
|---|---|---|---|---|---|---|---|---|---|---|
| Sinn Féin | Martina Anderson | 25.5 | 159,813 | | | | | | | |
| DUP | Diane Dodds | 20.9 | 131,163 | 131,831 | 131,845 | 133,465 | 139,791 | 143,009 | 179,302 | |
| UUP | Jim Nicholson | 13.3 | 83,438 | 84,418 | 84,426 | 86,672 | 92,301 | 99,260 | 135,993 | 158,212 |
| SDLP | Alex Attwood | 13.0 | 81,594 | 81,790 | 83,845 | 87,028 | 88,147 | 112,822 | 114,981 | 115,273 |
| TUV | Jim Allister | 12.1 | 75,806 | 76,182 | 76,195 | 77,065 | 84,438 | 86,020 | | |
| Alliance | Anna Lo | 7.1 | 44,432 | 44,978 | 45,292 | 53,953 | 55,347 | | | |
| UKIP | Henry Reilly | 3.9 | 24,584 | 24,914 | 24,945 | 26,017 | | | | |
| Green (NI) | Ross Brown | 1.7 | 10,598 | 10,923 | 11,038 | | | | | |
| NI21 | Tina McKenzie | 1.7 | 10,553 | 10,823 | 10,862 | | | | | |
| NI Conservatives | Mark Brotherston | 0.7 | 4,144 | | | | | | | |
Electorate: 1,226,771 Valid: 626,125 Spoilt: 9,968 (1.6%) Quota: 156,532 Turnout: 635,927

=== 2009 ===
2009 European Parliament election: Northern Ireland
| Party | Candidate | FPv% | Count | | |
| Party | Candidate | FPv% | 1 | 2 | 3 |
|---|---|---|---|---|---|
| Sinn Féin | Bairbre de Brún | 26.0 | 126,184 | | |
| DUP | Diane Dodds | 18.2 | 88,346 | 91,260 | 115,722 |
| UCU-NF | Jim Nicholson | 17.1 | 82,893 | 94,285 | 132,227 |
| SDLP | Alban Maginness | 16.2 | 78,489 | 94,814 | 97,428 |
| TUV | Jim Allister | 13.7 | 66,197 | 70,481 | |
| Alliance | Ian Parsley | 5.5 | 26,699 | | |
| Green (NI) | Steven Agnew | 3.3 | 15,764 | | |
Electorate: 1,141,979 Valid: 484,572 Spoilt: 4,319 (0.9%) Quota: 121,144 Turnout: 488,891

=== 2004 ===
2004 European Parliament election: Northern Ireland
| Party | Candidate | FPv% | Count | | |
| Party | Candidate | FPv% | 1 | 2 | 3 |
|---|---|---|---|---|---|
| DUP | Jim Allister | 32.0 | 175,761 | | |
| Sinn Féin | Bairbre de Brún | 26.3 | 144,541 | | |
| UUP | Jim Nicholson | 16.6 | 91,164 | 124,646 | 147,058 |
| SDLP | Martin Morgan | 15.9 | 87,559 | 88,010 | 108,531 |
| Independent | John Gilliland | 6.6 | 36,270 | 39,390 | |
| Socialist Environmental | Eamonn McCann | 1.6 | 9,172 | 9,268 | |
| Green (NI) | Lindsay Whitcroft | 0.9 | 4,810 | 5,134 | |
Electorate: 1,072,669 Valid: 549,277 Spoilt: 5,467 (1.0%) Quota: 137,320 Turnout: 554,744

Gilliland's candidacy was supported by Alliance, Workers' Party, Labour and others.

=== 1999 ===
1999 European Parliament election: Northern Ireland
| Party | Candidate | FPv% | Count | | |
| Party | Candidate | FPv% | 1 | 2 | 3 |
|---|---|---|---|---|---|
| DUP | Ian Paisley | 28.4 | 192,762 | | |
| SDLP | John Hume | 28.1 | 190,731 | | |
| UUP | Jim Nicholson | 17.6 | 119,507 | 162,627 | 184,739 |
| Sinn Féin | Mitchel McLaughlin | 17.3 | 117,643 | 119,352 | 119,384 |
| PUP | David Ervine | 3.31 | 22,494 | | |
| UK Unionist | Robert McCartney | 2.98 | 20,283 | | |
| Alliance | Seán Neeson | 2.12 | 14,391 | | |
| Natural Law | James Anderson | 0.15 | 998 | | |
Electorate: 1,191,307 Valid: 678,809 Spoilt: 8,764 Quota: 169,703 Turnout: 687,573

=== 1994 ===
1994 European Parliament election: Northern Ireland – 3 seats
| Party | Candidate | FPv% | Count | |
| Party | Candidate | FPv% | 1 | 2 |
|---|---|---|---|---|
| DUP | Ian Paisley | 29.2 | 163,246 | |
| SDLP | John Hume | 28.9 | 161,992 | |
| UUP | Jim Nicholson | 23.8 | 133,459 | 149,541.25 |
| Alliance | Mary Clark-Glass | 4.1 | 23,157 | 23,375.55 |
| Sinn Féin | Tom Hartley | 3.8 | 21,273 | 21,278.10 |
| Sinn Féin | Dodie McGuinness | 3.1 | 17,195 | 17,238.95 |
| Sinn Féin | Francie Molloy | 3.0 | 16,747 | 16.756.60 |
| Ulster Independence | Hugh Ross | 1.4 | 7,858 | 12,575.05 |
| NI Conservatives | Myrtle Boal | 1.0 | 5,583 | 6,106.95 |
| Workers' Party | John Lowry | 0.5 | 2,543 | 2,579.00 |
| Labour Party NI | Niall Cusack | 0.4 | 2,464 | 2,518.90 |
| Natural Law | James Anderson | 0.2 | 1,418 | 1,492.70 |
| Independent | June Campion | 0.2 | 1,088 | 1,127.15 |
| Independent | David Kerr | 0.1 | 571 | 877.15 |
| Natural Law | Susannah Thompson | 0.1 | 454 | 534.40 |
| Natural Law | Michael Kennedy | 0.1 | 419 | 443.90 |
| Independent | Robert Mooney | 0.1 | 400 | 455.95 |
Electorate: 1,151,389 Valid: 559,867 Spoilt: 9,234 Quota: 139,967 Turnout: 49.4%

- Note 1: Campion's candidacy, with the ballot paper description 'Peace Coalition', was supported by Democratic Left, the Greens and some Labour groups.
- Note 2: Kerr appeared on the ballot paper with the description Independence for Ulster.
- Note 3: Mooney appeared on the ballot paper with the description Constitutional Independent Northern Ireland.

=== 1989 ===
1989 European Parliament election: Northern Ireland
| Party | Candidate | FPv% | Count | |
| Party | Candidate | FPv% | 1 | 2 |
|---|---|---|---|---|
| DUP | Ian Paisley | 29.9 | 160,110 | |
| SDLP | John Hume | 25.5 | 136,335 | |
| UUP | Jim Nicholson | 22.2 | 118,785 | 141,583 |
| Sinn Féin | Danny Morrison | 9.1 | 48,914 | 48,987 |
| Alliance | John Alderdice | 5.2 | 27,905 | 28,633 |
| NI Conservatives | Laurence Kennedy | 4.8 | 25,789 | 26,872 |
| Green (NI) | Malcolm Samuel | 1.2 | 6,569 | 6,876 |
| Workers' Party | Seamus Lynch | 1.0 | 5,590 | 5,668 |
| Labour | Mark Langhammer | 0.7 | 3,540 | 3,661 |
| Labour Party NI | Brian Caul | 0.2 | 1,274 | 1,304 |
Electorate: 1,106,852 Valid: 534,811 Spoilt: 5,356 Quota: 133,703 Turnout: 540,167

Langhammer appeared on the ballot as the 'Labour Representation' candidate – the Campaign for Labour Representation aimed to persuade the British Labour Party to organise in Northern Ireland.

Caul appeared on the ballot as the candidate of Labour '87, a merger of the Labour Party of Northern Ireland, Northern Ireland Labour Party, Ulster Liberal Party and United Labour Party.

=== 1984 ===
1984 European Parliament election: Northern Ireland
| Party | Candidate | FPv% | Count | | | |
| Party | Candidate | FPv% | 1 | 2 | 3 | 4 |
|---|---|---|---|---|---|---|
| DUP | Ian Paisley | 33.6 | 230,251 | | | |
| SDLP | John Hume | 22.1 | 151,399 | 151,664 | 156,310 | 183,256 |
| UUP | John Taylor | 21.5 | 147,169 | 185,714 | | |
| Sinn Féin | Danny Morrison | 13.3 | 91,476 | 91,525 | 92,644 | 93,079 |
| Alliance | David Cook | 5.0 | 34,046 | 34,892 | 37,401 | |
| UPUP | James Kilfedder | 2.9 | 20,092 | 38,293 | 38,854 | |
| Workers' Party | Seamus Lynch | 1.3 | 8,712 | 8,813 | | |
| Ecology | Colin McGuigan | 0.3 | 2,172 | 2,236 | | |
Electorate: 1,065,363 Valid: 685,317 Spoilt: 11,654 Quota: 171,330 Turnout: 696,994

=== 1979 ===
1979 European Parliament election: Northern Ireland
| Party | Candidate | FPv% | Count | | | | | |
| Party | Candidate | FPv% | 1 | 2 | 3 | 4 | 5 | 6 |
|---|---|---|---|---|---|---|---|---|
| DUP | Ian Paisley | 29.8 | 170,688 | | | | | |
| SDLP | John Hume | 24.5 | 140,622 | 140,676 | 146,072 | | | |
| UUP | John Taylor | 11.9 | 68,185 | 77,228 | 80,207 | 80,405 | 96,407 | 153,466 |
| UUP | Harry West | 10.0 | 56,984 | 61,163 | 61,952 | 62,140 | 65,915 | |
| Alliance | Oliver Napier | 6.8 | 39,026 | 39,404 | 45,702 | 51,263 | | |
| Ind. Unionist | James Kilfedder | 6.7 | 38,198 | 50,622 | 53,986 | 54,623 | 69,383 | 72,557 |
| Ind. Republican | Bernadette McAliskey | 5.9 | 33,969 | 33,975 | 36,105 | | | |
| Independent | David Bleakley (Note: Appeared on the ballot paper with the description 'United Community.') | 1.6 | 9,383 | 9,600 | | | | |
| United Labour | Paddy Devlin | 1.1 | 6,122 | 6,146 | | | | |
| Unionist Party NI | Eddie Cummings | 0.6 | 3,712 | 3,836 | | | | |
| Republican Clubs | Brian Brennan | 0.6 | 3,258 | 3,263 | | | | |
| Republican Clubs | Francis Donnelly | 0.2 | 1,160 | 1,164 | | | | |
| Ulster Liberal | James Murray | 0.2 | 932 | 948 | | | | |
Electorate: 1,029,490 Valid: 572,239 Spoilt: 13,773 Quota: 143,060 Turnout: 586,059
