= 2007 Northern Ireland Assembly election =

- 7 March 2007

All 108 seats to the Northern Ireland Assembly
- Turnout: 62.3% ▼0.7%
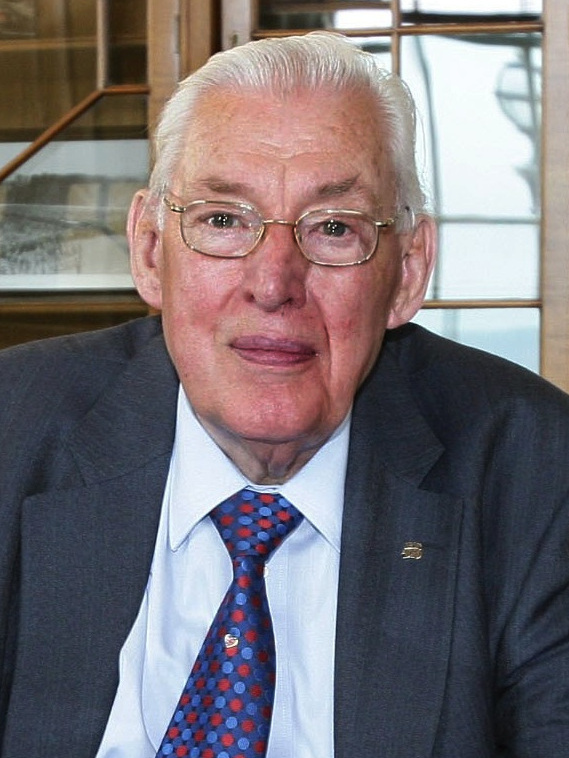

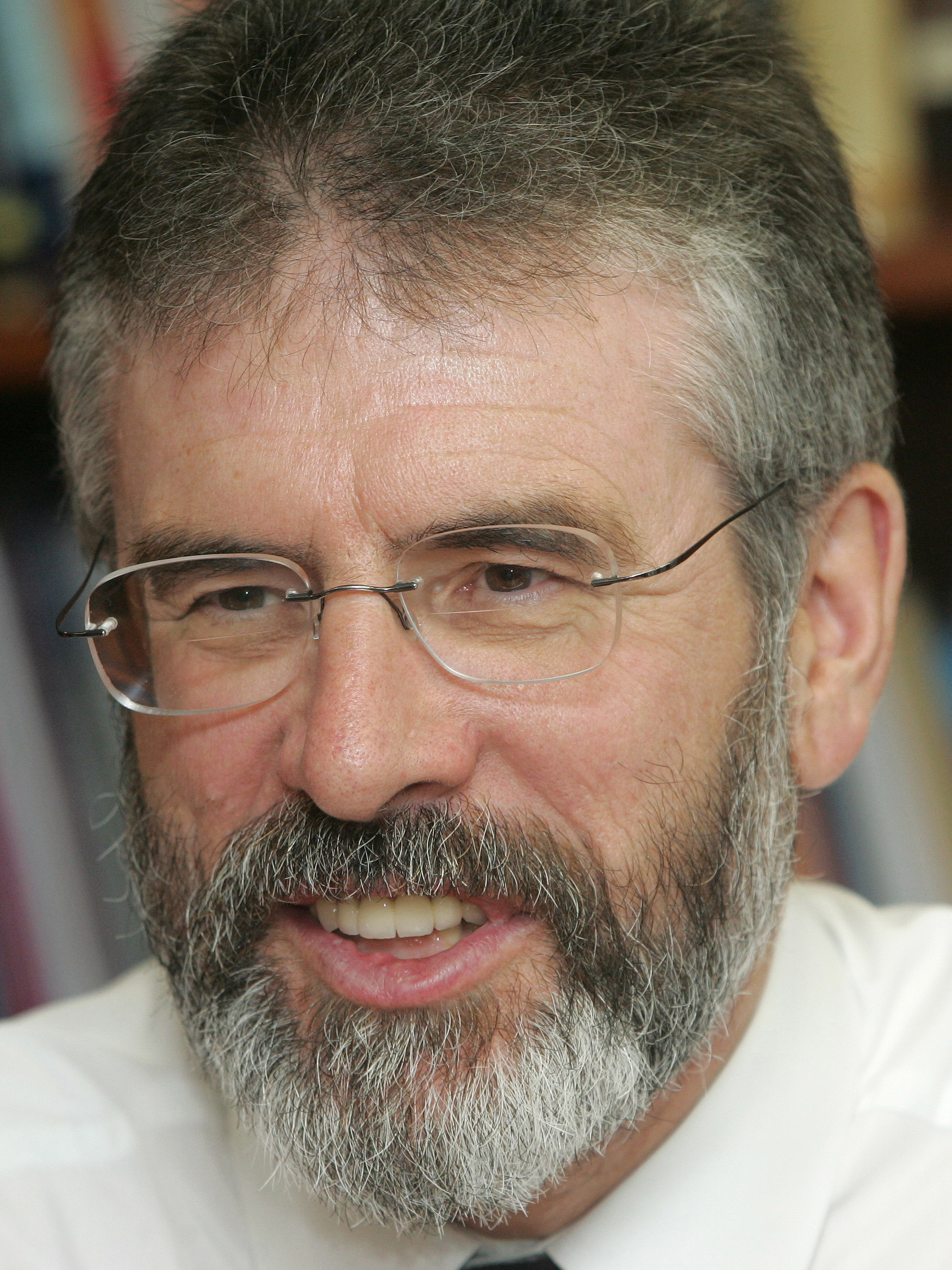

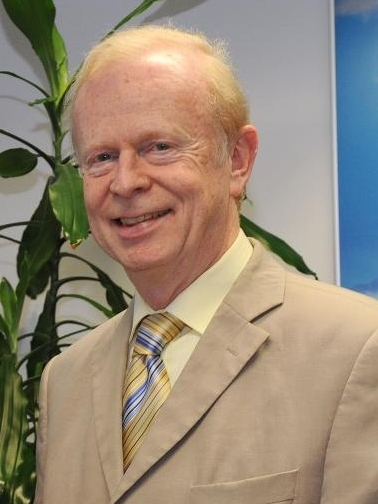

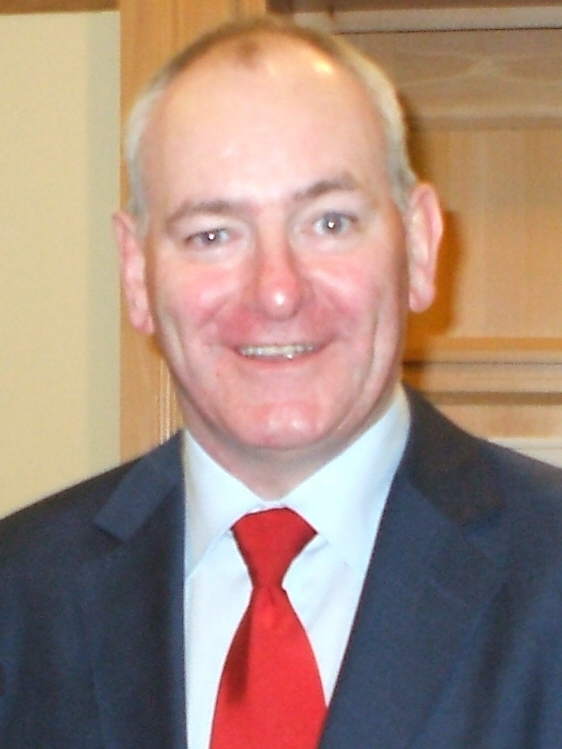

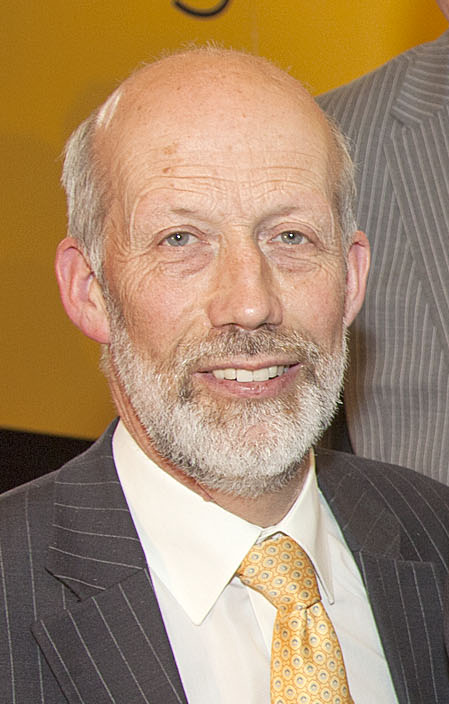

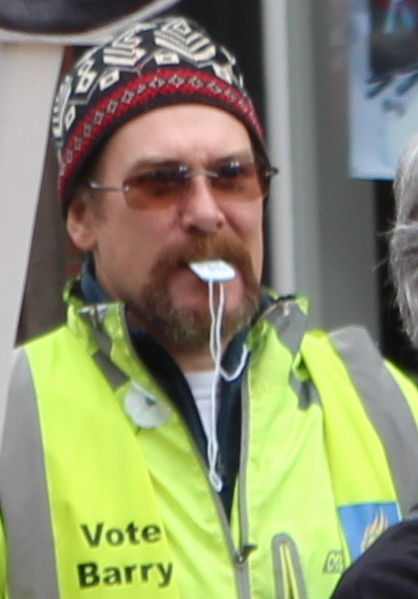

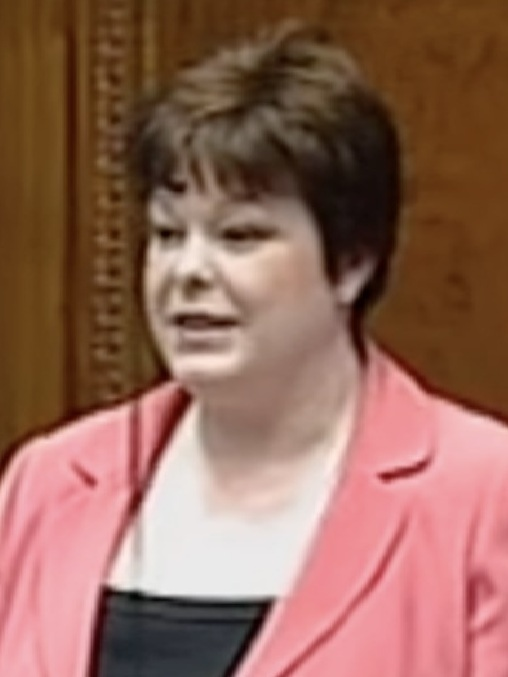
	First party	Second party	Third party
Leader	Ian Paisley	Gerry Adams	Reg Empey
Party	DUP	Sinn Féin	UUP
Leader since	30 September 1971	13 November 1983	24 June 2005
Leader's seat	North Antrim	Belfast West	Belfast East
Last election	30 seats, 27.8%	24 seats, 23.5%	27 seats, 22.7%
Seats before	32	21	24
Seats won	36	28	18
Seat change	▲6	▲4	▼9
Popular vote	207,721	180,573	103,145
Percentage	30.1%	26.2%	14.9%
Swing	▲4.4%	▲2.7%	▼7.8%
	Fourth party	Fifth party	Sixth party
Leader	Mark Durkan	David Ford	John Barry
Party	SDLP	Alliance	Green (NI)
Leader since	10 November 2001	6 October 2001	January 2003
Leader's seat	Foyle	South Antrim	Did not stand
Last election	18 seats, 16.7%	6 seats, 3.7%	0 seat, 0.4%
Seats before	18	5	0
Seats won	16	7	1
Seat change	▼2	▲1	▲1
Popular vote	105,164	36,139	11,985
Percentage	15.2%	5.2%	1.7%
Swing	▼1.8%	▲1.5%	▲1.3%
	Seventh party
Leader	Dawn Purvis
Party	PUP
Leader since	2007
Leader's seat	Belfast East
Last election	1 seat, 1.2%
Seats before	1
Seats won	1
Seat change	Steady
Popular vote	3,822
Percentage	0.6%
Swing	▼0.6%
- Election results. Voters elect 6 assembly members from the 18 constituencies.
First Minister and deputy First Minister of Northern Ireland before election
Suspended
First Minister and deputy First Minister of Northern Ireland after election
Ian Paisley (DUP) &
Martin McGuinness (SF)

The 2007 Northern Ireland Assembly election was held on Wednesday, 7 March 2007. It was the third election to take place since the devolved assembly was established in 1998. The election saw endorsement of the St Andrews Agreement and the two largest parties, the Democratic Unionist Party (DUP) and Sinn Féin, along with the Alliance Party, increase their support, with falls in support for the Ulster Unionist Party (UUP) and the Social Democratic and Labour Party (SDLP).

The 2007 election was held using STV and 18 multi-seat districts, each electing 6 members.

== Background ==
At the 2003 election the DUP became the largest party. As it opposed the Belfast Agreement, there was no prospect of the assembly voting for the First and Deputy First Ministers. Therefore, the British Government did not restore power to the Assembly and the elected members never met. Instead there commenced a protracted series of negotiations. During these negotiations a legally separate assembly, known as The Assembly consisting of the members elected in 2003 was formed in May 2006 to enable the parties to negotiate and to prepare for government.

Eventually, in October 2006, the governments and the parties, including the DUP, made the St Andrews Agreement and a new transitional assembly came into effect on 24 November 2006. The British government agreed to fresh elections and the transitional assembly was dissolved on 30 January 2007, after which campaigning began.

== The process ==
The election was conducted using the single transferable vote applied to six-seat constituencies. The First Minister and Deputy First Minister were chosen by the largest parties from the two different political designations. Parties who won seats were then allocated places on the executive committee in proportion to their seats in the Assembly using the D'Hondt method.

== The campaign ==
The major parties standing were the Democratic Unionist Party (DUP) and the Ulster Unionist Party (UUP) on the Unionist side, and Sinn Féin and the Social Democratic and Labour Party (SDLP) on the Nationalist side.

The largest cross-community party, the Alliance Party of Northern Ireland, contested the election in 17 of 18 constituencies. Smaller parties also included the Progressive Unionist Party, the Green Party and the UK Unionist Party. Some independent Unionists also stood.

Among the other parties that stood, the Conservatives nominated nine and there were six candidates for the Workers' Party. Also there were four candidates for Make Politicians History and two for the Socialist Party. Six Republican Sinn Féin-aligned candidates also stood. As the party had chosen not to register as a political party with the electoral commission, the party name did not appear alongside its candidates on ballot papers.

One of the key issues in the election was which two political parties would gain the largest number of Assembly seats. The St Andrews Agreement stated that the First Minister will be chosen from the largest party of the largest political designation and the Deputy First Minister from the largest party from the second largest political designation; however, the actual legislation states that the largest party shall make the nomination regardless of designation.

== Results ==
Result by constituencies

(in order of first preference vote)

The DUP remained the largest party in the Assembly, making significant gains from the UUP.

Sinn Féin made gains from the SDLP and was the largest party among the Nationalists.

The only other Assembly Party to make gains was the liberal Alliance Party (winning seven seats, a gain of one), while the Progressive Unionist Party and independent health campaigner Dr Kieran Deeny retained their single seats, and were joined by the Green Party, which won its first Assembly seat, and increased its first preference votes fourfold from 2003.

The UK Unionist Party lost its representation in the Assembly. They had contested 12 seats, with Robert McCartney standing in six of them.

Overall, Unionist parties were collectively down 4 seats, Nationalist parties were collectively up 2 seats, and others were up 2 seats.

The election was notable as it saw the first Chinese-born person to be elected to a parliamentary institution in Europe: Anna Lo of the Alliance Party.

Party	Votes	%	+/–	Seats		
Party	Votes	%	+/–	Assembly	+/–	Executive
Democratic Unionist Party	207,721	30.09	+4.4	36	+6	5
Sinn Féin	180,573	26.16	+2.6	28	+4	4
Social Democratic and Labour Party	105,164	15.23	−1.8	16	-2	1
Ulster Unionist Party	103,145	14.94	−7.7	18	-9	2
Alliance Party of Northern Ireland	36,139	5.24	+1.5	7	+1	–
Green Party in Northern Ireland	11,985	1.74	+1.3	1	+1	–
UK Unionist Party	10,452	1.51	+0.7	–	-1	–
Progressive Unionist Party	3,822	0.55	−0.6	1	–	–
Northern Ireland Conservatives	3,457	0.50	+0.3	–	–	–
Republican Sinn Féin	2,522	0.37		–	–	–
Socialist Environmental Alliance	2,045	0.30	−0.1	–	–	–
UK Independence Party	1,229	0.18		–	–	–
Workers' Party	975	0.14	−0.1	–	–	–
People Before Profit Alliance	774	0.11		–	–	–
Socialist Party	473	0.07	+0.1	–	–	–
Make Politicians History	221	0.03		–	–	–
Labour Party of Northern Ireland	123	0.02		–	–	–
Pro Capitalism	22	0.00		–	–	–
Independent	19,471	2.82	+1.9	1	–	–
Total	690,313	100.00	–	108	0	12
Registered voters/turnout	1,107,904	62.31				

=== Distribution of seats by constituency ===
Party affiliation of the six Assembly members returned by each constituency. The first column indicates the party of the Member of the House of Commons (MP) returned by the corresponding parliamentary constituency in the 2005 United Kingdom general election under the first-past-the-post voting method.

Party of MP, 2005	Constituency	Northern Ireland Assembly seats										
Party of MP, 2005	Constituency	Total									Gained by	Formerly held by
Party of MP, 2005	Constituency	Total	APNI	DUP	PUP	SDLP	Sinn Féin	Green	UUP	Ind.	Gained by	Formerly held by
DUP	North Antrim	6	–	3	–	1	1	–	1	–	–	–
DUP	East Antrim	6	1	3	–	–	–	–	2	–	–	–
DUP	South Antrim	6	1	2	–	1	1	–	1	–	SF	UUP
DUP	Belfast North	6	–	2	–	1	2	–	1	–	–	–
Sinn Féin	Belfast West	6	–	–	–	1	5	–	–	–	SF	DUP
SDLP	Belfast South	6	1	1	–	2	1	–	1	–	Alliance	UUP
DUP	Belfast East	6	1	3	1	–	–	–	1	–	DUP	UUP
UUP	North Down	6	1	2	–	–	–	1	2	–	Green	UKU
DUP	Strangford	6	1	4	–	–	–	–	1	–	DUP	UUP
DUP	Lagan Valley	6	1	3	–	–	1	–	1	–	SF	SDLP
DUP	Lagan Valley	6	1	3	–	–	1	–	1	–	DUP	UUP
DUP	Lagan Valley	6	1	3	–	–	1	–	1	–	DUP	UUP
DUP	Upper Bann	6	–	2	–	1	1	–	2	–	–	–
SDLP	South Down	6	–	1	–	2	2	–	1	–	–	–
Sinn Féin	Newry and Armagh	6	–	1	–	1	3	–	1	–	–	–
Sinn Féin	Fermanagh & South Tyrone	6	–	2	–	1	2	–	1	–	DUP	UUP
Sinn Féin	West Tyrone	6	–	2	–	–	3	–	–	1	SF	SDLP
Sinn Féin	West Tyrone	6	–	2	–	–	3	–	–	1	DUP	UUP
Sinn Féin	Mid Ulster	6	–	1	–	1	3	–	1	–	–	–
SDLP	Foyle	6	–	1	–	3	2	–	–	–	–	–
DUP	East Londonderry	6	–	3	–	1	1	–	2	–	DUP	UUP
Total		108	7	36	1	16	28	1	18	1		
Change since 2003		–	+ 1	+ 6	–	– 2	+ 4	+ 1	− 9	–	–1 UKU	–
Elected on 23 November 2003		108	6	30	1	18	24	0	27	1	5 UKU	2 NIWC
Elected on 25 June 1998		108	6	20	2	24	18	0	28	3	5 UKU	2 NIWC

== Executive Committee seats ==
Parties who won seats are allocated places on the Executive Committee using the D'Hondt method and under the St Andrews agreement the largest party gets the right to nominate the first minister and the largest party perceived to be from "the other side" nominates the deputy first minister. Despite the name these offices are in fact of equal right. Note that they are both ministers in the same department (Office of the First Minister and Deputy First Minister). Using this system, the executive appointed in 2007 was as follows:

Department	Minister	Party
First Minister	Ian Paisley	DUP
Deputy First Minister	Martin McGuinness	Sinn Féin
Enterprise, Trade and Investment	Nigel Dodds	DUP
Finance & Personnel	Peter Robinson	DUP
Regional Development	Conor Murphy	Sinn Féin
Education	Caitríona Ruane	Sinn Féin
Employment and Learning	Sir Reg Empey	UUP
Environment	Arlene Foster	DUP
Culture, Arts & Leisure	Edwin Poots	DUP
Health, Social Services & Public Safety	Michael McGimpsey	UUP
Agriculture	Michelle Gildernew	Sinn Féin
Social Development	Margaret Ritchie	SDLP

There are two junior ministers in OFMDFM who are, at present, Jeffery Donaldson (DUP) and Gerry Kelly (SF). In April 2010, the Department of Justice was formed, being led by David Ford from the Alliance Party. This is the Alliance Party's first ministerial role.

== Opinion polls ==
An opinion poll by Ipsos MORI, published in The Belfast Telegraph on 1 March 2007, reported the voting intentions of those who intended to vote and had decided which party to vote for:

Party	Percentage	Actual Vote
DUP	25	30
Sinn Féin	22	26
SDLP	20	15
UUP	16	15
Alliance	9	5
Green (NI)	3	2
Conservative	1	0.5
UK Unionist	1	1.5
PUP	1	0.6
Independent	1	3

== MLAs who lost their seats at the election ==
- Michael Copeland (UUP, Belfast East)
- Esmond Birnie (UUP, Belfast South)
- Diane Dodds (DUP, Belfast West)
- Norman Hillis (UUP, East Londonderry)
- Marietta Farrell (SDLP, Lagan Valley)
- Billy Bell (UUP, Lagan Valley)
- Paul Berry (Ind, Newry and Armagh)
- Davy Hyland (Ind, Newry and Armagh)
- Robert McCartney (UKUP, North Down)
- George Ennis (UKUP, Strangford)
- Eugene McMenamin (SDLP, West Tyrone)
- Derek Hussey (UUP, West Tyrone)

Notes: Berry and Ennis were originally elected as DUP candidates, Hyland was originally elected as a Sinn Féin candidate.

== MLAs who stood down at the election ==
- Eileen Bell (Alliance/Speaker, North Down)
- Seamus Close (Alliance, Lagan Valley)
- Geraldine Dougan (Sinn Féin, Mid Ulster)
- Sean Farren (SDLP, North Antrim)
- Patricia Lewsley^{†} (SDLP, Lagan Valley)
- Philip McGuigan (Sinn Féin, North Antrim)
- Dermot Nesbitt (UUP, South Down)
- Tom O'Reilly (Sinn Féin, Fermanagh and South Tyrone)
- Kathy Stanton (Sinn Féin, North Belfast)
- Lord Kilclooney (UUP, Strangford)
- Lord Trimble (UUP, Upper Bann)
- Jim Wilson (UUP, South Antrim)

^{†}Patricia Lewsley stood down prior to the dissolution of the assembly

== MLAs deselected by their party ==
- Wilson Clyde (DUP, South Antrim)
- George Ennis (DUP, Strangford)
- Paul Girvan (DUP, South Antrim)
- Davy Hyland (Sinn Féin, Newry and Armagh)
- Patricia O'Rawe (Sinn Féin, Newry and Armagh)
- Norah Beare^{↑} (DUP, Lagan Valley)
- Mark Robinson (DUP, Belfast South)

^{↑} As a sitting MLA, Norah Beare defected from the UUP to the DUP, and is therefore unselected rather than deselected.

Following their de-selection, both Ennis and Hyland unsuccessfully sought election under the UKUP and independent labels respectively.

== MLAs deceased since 2003 election ==
- David Ervine (PUP, Belfast East)
- Michael Ferguson (Sinn Féin, Belfast West)

== See also ==
- Concerned Republicans
- 3rd Northern Ireland Assembly
- 2007 Irish general election
- 2007 Scottish Parliament election
- 2007 National Assembly for Wales election
