= Ruth Patterson (politician) =

Former deputy lord mayor of Belfast

Deputy Lord Mayor of Belfast
- In office June 2011 – June 2012
- Preceded by: William Humphrey
- Succeeded by: Tierna Cunningham
- In office 1 June 2006 – 2007
- Preceded by: Pat Convery
- Succeeded by: Bernie Kelly

High Sheriff of Belfast
- In office 18 January 2004 – January 2005
- Preceded by: Margaret Clarke
- Succeeded by: David Browne

Member of Belfast City Council
- In office 22 May 2014 – 2 May 2019
- Preceded by: New district
- Succeeded by: Áine Groogan
- Constituency: Botanic
- In office 7 June 2001 – 22 May 2014
- Preceded by: Harry Smith
- Succeeded by: Christopher Stalford
- Constituency: Balmoral

Personal details
- Born: October 1955 (age 70) Dungannon, County Tyrone, Northern Ireland
- Party: TUV (since 2021); DUP (1998–2015)
- Other political affiliations: Independent Unionist (2015–2019)

Ruth Patterson (born October 1955) is a former Northern Irish unionist politician who was deputy Lord Mayor of Belfast between 2006 and 2007, then 2011 to 2012. Additionally, she served as High Sheriff of Belfast from 2004 to 2005. Patterson was a Belfast City councillor from 2001 to 2019, initially for the Balmoral DEA, later Botanic.

== Background ==
Originally from Dungannon, Patterson moved to Belfast in 1974 to train as a nurse in the Royal Victoria Hospital. She later joined the Ulster Defence Regiment (UDR) during The Troubles, serving for three years.

== Political career ==
Patterson joined the Democratic Unionist Party (DUP) in 1998, following the signing of the Good Friday Agreement. Commenting on the signatories of the Agreement in 1999, she said: “May god forgive them, for I won’t … and neither will the children of Ulster.”

=== Belfast City Council ===
Patterson was the campaign manager for successful DUP candidates, Peter Robinson and Nigel Dodds, at the 2001 general election. She was also elected to Belfast City Council, at the concurrent local elections, for the Balmoral District.

On 28 September 2002, during a street party in Cluan Place, East Belfast, she and Peter Robinson blocked a road that residents had requested to be closed, but had been turned down by the police.

At the 2003 Northern Ireland Assembly election, she was the unsuccessful running mate to Mark Robinson in South Belfast, polling 2,538 first-preference votes (8.1%).

In January 2004, Patterson was made High Sheriff of Belfast, becoming the eighth woman to hold office.

She became deputy Lord Mayor of Belfast in June 2006, serving under the SDLP's Patrick McCarthy.

Patterson stood again in South Belfast at the 2011 Assembly election, being the last candidate eliminated, with 3,800 first-preference votes (11.8%). She was re-elected to the council that same day.

On 27 May 2011, Patterson was made deputy Lord Mayor again, as well as an alderman. She notably refused to shake the hand of the Sinn Féin Lord Mayor, Niall Ó Donnghaile, nor respond to his congratulations. O' Donnghaile said: "I wanted to wish her congratulations, it is unfortunate she refused to accept them." The DUP, however, backed Patterson, with the party's group leader, Robin Newton, saying: "Ruth Patterson has been a Councillor for more than ten years. She knows how Council meetings should be conducted and what the protocol is for such occasions. "She will be a fine ambassador for our city and brings a wealth of experience and dynamism to the role which others can only aspire to." Patterson later claimed she had a "hearing impediment", so was unable to understand Ó Donnghaile's congratulations.

On 2 August 2013, Patterson was arrested and subsequently released and charged with 'grossly offensive communication', after commenting on a Facebook post. The post in question was in response to a planned Republican parade in Castlederg to commemorate the deaths of two IRA men who were killed by their own bomb, to which some users imagined an attack on the parade. Patterson responded by saying: "We would have done a great service to Northern Ireland and the world." She later apologised for the remarks, blaming it on a "lapse of judgement". Patterson attended Belfast Magistrates Court on 22 August 2013, in which she pleaded not guilty to the charge. The charge was eventually dropped on 20 December 2013, with Patterson saying: "I'm absolutely delighted. Justice has been done."

In March 2014, during a council meeting, Patterson tabled a motion for the council to recognise the work of retiring Linfield FC manager, David Jeffrey, notably wearing a Linfield scarf while delivering her motion. She was interrupted by Sinn Féin's group leader, Jim McVeigh, who questioned the deputy Lord Mayor chairing the meeting, Christopher Stalford, as to whether Patterson was allowed to wear the scarf. Stalford responded to McVeigh, telling him to stop acting like a "petulant child", and accused him of turning the meeting into a "circus".

She was re-elected at the 2014 local elections, this time for the new Botanic District.

==== Expulsion from the DUP ====
In November 2015, DUP leader Peter Robinson announced that Patterson had been expelled from the party. It was speculated that Patterson's expulsion had been due to her publicly criticising the party's decision to re-enter the Northern Ireland Executive. The DUP had chosen to resign from the executive in September 2015, after alleged IRA involvement in the murder of ex-member, Kevin McGuigan. Additionally, she was vocal about her opposition to Emma Pengelly's selection to replace Jimmy Spratt as South Belfast MLA. Pengelly was subsequently made a Junior Minister in the executive, with Patterson telling the Belfast Telegraph: "Emma is young, academic and nice-looking, but that doesn't give her the right to a seat she hasn't earned. I'm a great believer in earning your stripes. Politics shouldn't be about membership of a golden circle. You have to be a foot soldier first, to have knocked doors and worked for constituents. Emma hasn't done that." Patterson said that she would not appeal her expulsion, saying: "I wanted to do the job and had hoped to get the seat. You have to earn your stripes in a political party." She also denied reports that she would be joining the Traditional Unionist Voice (TUV), instead expressing a preference to remain on the council as an independent unionist.

In January 2016, following reports of a planned flag protest at the St Patrick's Day parade in Belfast, she advised against the protest, saying that it had no "strategic or political purpose." Patterson also criticised the use of the Irish tricolour at previous parades, saying: "At the end of the day the Tricolour has nothing to do with St Patrick, St Patrick himself was a former Protestant."

Ahead of the 2016 Assembly election, Patterson declared her candidacy as an independent for South Belfast. Her campaign was managed by loyalist blogger and flag protester, Jamie Bryson. She amassed only 475 first-preferences (1.3%), and was eliminated on the sixth count. Following the disappointing result, Patterson said that it was her intention to leave politics at the 2019 local elections.

During a council debate in July 2017, she caused controversy by alleging that Crumlin Star F.C. were linked to a senior republican. This followed a row over the club looking at playing their home games at South Belfast's Strangford Playing Fields. She said: “I have been working with many clubs in South Belfast who are forced to hire pitches elsewhere at considerable costs. We need to be careful about inviting another team in who would want preferential treatment. More worryingly for me, it is well known that a man named in Parliament as a senior member of the Provisional IRA...” She was told by the Lord Mayor Nuala McAllister to withdraw her remarks, though continued her speech by saying:“It is absolutely hypocritical to ask unionist members of this Council to support any club linked with a high-ranking republican terrorist.” Consequently, SDLP councillor Tim Attwood sent a complaint to the Northern Ireland Local Government Commissioner for Standards. At a hearing in February 2019, the commissioner found Patterson had breached the Local Government Code of Conduct. In a statement, the commissioner's office said that Patterson's actions were a "deliberate act which caused offence to the players and members" of Crumlin Star FC. After examining the evidence the commissioner decided that Alderman Patterson's conduct at the meeting brought her position as a councillor, and the council into disrepute." A week later, it was announced that Patterson would be suspended from the council for six months. However, this would only be valid until the May local elections, due to her having previously said that she would not be seeking re-election.

=== Subsequent activity ===
In an interview with Belfast Live in June 2021, Patterson revealed that she had joined the TUV. In a Facebook post, she said: "Join us as we move forward to defeat the real enemy of NI the DUP." Patterson's decision to join the party contrasts with her support for same-sex marriage, as well as extending the 1967 Abortion Act to Northern Ireland, both of which TUV are vehemently opposed to.
