= Botanic (District Electoral Area) =

Electoral division of Belfast, Northern Ireland

- Belfast City Council DEA constituency
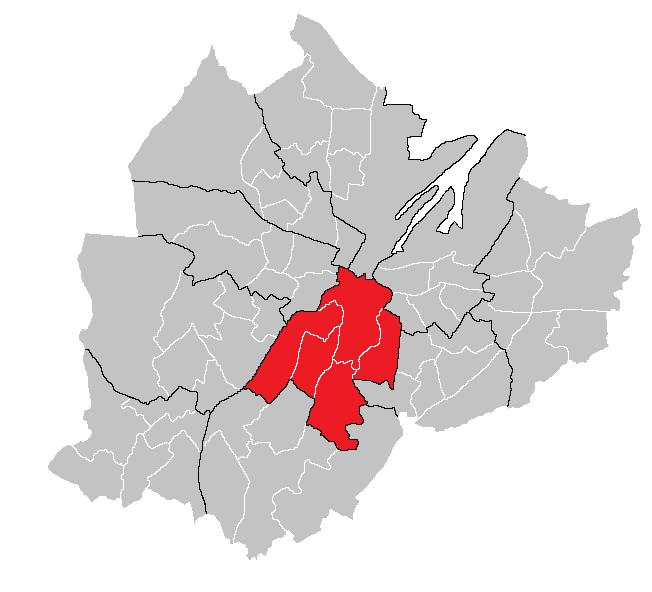
- Botanic DEA marked on a map of Belfast City Council and its wards

Current constituency
- Created: 2014
- Seats: 5 (2014–)
- Councillors: Áine Groogan (GPNI); Tracy Kelly (DUP); Emmet McDonough-Brown (APNI); Conor McKay (SF); Gary McKeown (SDLP)

Botanic is one of the ten district electoral areas (DEA) in Belfast, Northern Ireland. The district elects five members to Belfast City Council and contains the wards of Blackstaff; Central; Ormeau; Stranmillis, and Windsor. Botanic, along with neighbouring Balmoral, forms the greater part of the Belfast South constituencies for the Northern Ireland Assembly and UK Parliament. It covers large parts of the centre and southern parts of the city.

It was created for the 2014 local elections, largely replacing the Laganbank DEA, which had existed since 1985. The DEA is named after Belfast's Botanic Gardens.

== Education ==
Botanic is the location for several of the city's most important education establishments, including Queen's University Belfast, Stranmillis University College and Union Theological College. The location of these institutions in close proximity saw the area's popularity among students increase, particularly in the Holyland area.

The area is also home to some of the most prominent schools, including Aquinas Diocesan Grammar School, Methodist College Belfast and the Royal Belfast Academical Institution.

== Culture ==
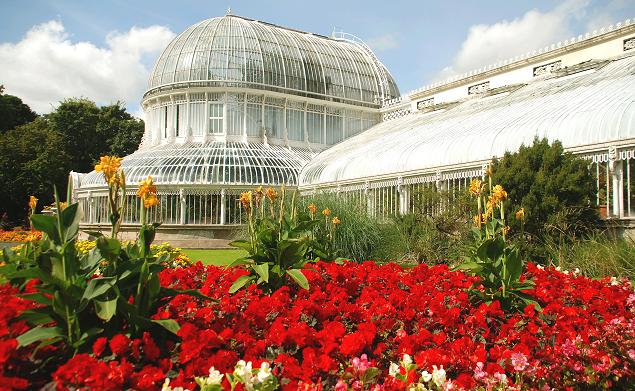
Botanic Gardens

The portion of Botanic to the west of the River Lagan, based around Queen's University, forms the Queen's Quarter, and contains many of the key cultural facilities within the city. The Quarter is home the Brian Friel Theatre, the Crescent Arts Centre, the Elmwood Hall, the Lyric Theatre, the Naughton Gallery at Queen's, the Queen's Film Theatre and the Ulster Museum.

As well as the Queen's Quarter, there are a number of important cultural attractions within the wider DEA section of the city centre, including the Grand Opera House, the Linen Hall Library, the Ulster Hall, the Ulster Orchestra and the Waterfront Hall.

== Other amenities ==
Other noteworthy amenities in the Botanic district electoral area include:

- Belfast Grand Central, Botanic, Belfast Lanyon Place and City Hospital railway stations
- Belfast City Hall
- Belfast City Hospital
- Broadcasting House (BBC Northern Ireland)
- Crown Liquor Saloon
- Europa Hotel
- Queen's University Belfast Students' Union
- Royal Courts of Justice
- St George's Market
- St Malachy's Church
- Victoria Square Shopping Centre

== Councillors ==
Election	Councillor (Party)	Councillor (Party)	Councillor (Party)	Councillor (Party)	Councillor (Party)
February 2024 Co-Option	Conor McKay (Sinn Féin)	Gary McKeown (SDLP)	Emmet McDonough-Brown (Alliance)	Áine Groogan (Green Party)	Tracy Kelly (DUP)
2023	John Gormley (Sinn Féin)	Gary McKeown (SDLP)	Emmet McDonough-Brown (Alliance)	Áine Groogan (Green Party)	Tracy Kelly (DUP)
January 2020 Co-Option	John Gormley (Sinn Féin)	Gary McKeown (SDLP)	Emmet McDonough-Brown (Alliance)	Áine Groogan (Green Party)	Tracy Kelly (DUP)
2019	Deirdre Hargey (Sinn Féin)	Gary McKeown (SDLP)	Emmet McDonough-Brown (Alliance)	Áine Groogan (Green Party)	Tracy Kelly (DUP)
June 2017 Defection	Deirdre Hargey (Sinn Féin)	Declan Boyle (SDLP)/ (Independent)	Emmet McDonough-Brown (Alliance)	Ruth Patterson (DUP)/ (Independent)	Graham Craig (DUP)/ (UUP)
October 2016 Defection	Deirdre Hargey (Sinn Féin)	Declan Boyle (SDLP)/ (Independent)	Emmet McDonough-Brown (Alliance)	Ruth Patterson (DUP)/ (Independent)	Graham Craig (DUP)/ (UUP)
November 2015 Defection	Deirdre Hargey (Sinn Féin)	Declan Boyle (SDLP)/ (Independent)	Emmet McDonough-Brown (Alliance)	Ruth Patterson (DUP)/ (Independent)	Graham Craig (DUP)/ (UUP)
2014	Deirdre Hargey (Sinn Féin)	Declan Boyle (SDLP)/ (Independent)	Emmet McDonough-Brown (Alliance)	Ruth Patterson (DUP)/ (Independent)	Graham Craig (DUP)/ (UUP)

== 2023 Results ==
2019: 1 x DUP, 1 x Alliance, 1 x Sinn Féin, 1 x Green, 1 x SDLP

2023: 1 x Sinn Féin, 1 x DUP, 1 x SDLP, 1 x Alliance, 1 x Green

2019–2023 Change: No change

Botanic - 5 seats
Party	Candidate	FPv%	Count								
Party	Candidate	FPv%	1	2	3	4	5	6	7	8	9
SDLP	Gary McKeown*	17.76%	1,881								
DUP	Tracy Kelly*	12.95%	1,372	1,372.42	1,382.48	1,525.54	1,529.54	1,717.90	2,342.90		
Alliance	Emmet McDonough-Brown*	10.25%	1,086	1,118.94	1,144.48	1,150.48	1,182.02	1,263.56	1,275.62	1,298.62	1,951.62
Sinn Féin	John Gormley* †	14.47%	1,533	1,543.80	1,560.22	1,562.22	1,584.28	1,587.34	1,588.46	1,591.46	1,602.18
Green (NI)	Áine Groogan*	9.50%	1,006	1,023.88	1,080.66	1,089.72	1,299.68	1,343.16	1,355.16	1,394.16	1,544.34
Sinn Féin	Emma-Jane Faulkner	9.89%	1,048	1,061.08	1,081.44	1,087.50	1,127.86	1,132.92	1,135.92	1,135.92	1,157.06
Alliance	Chris Ogle	6.87%	728	754.76	768.42	772.42	821.90	880.44	895.50	912.50	
DUP	Darren Leighton	6.13%	649	649.24	656.30	708.30	709.36	765.36			
UUP	Jeffrey Dudgeon	3.59%	380	381.98	399.16	477.28	484.34				
People Before Profit	Sipho Sibanda	2.91%	308	310.58	406.88	408.88					
TUV	Billy Dickson	2.95%	312	312.30	316.36						
Socialist Party	Neil Moore	1.41%	149	150.68							
Workers' Party	Paddy Lynn	0.84%	89	90.62							
NI Conservatives	Idris Maiga	0.49%	52	52.66							
Electorate: 23,049 Valid: 10,593 (45.96%) Spoilt: 162 Quota: 1,766 Turnout: 10,755 (46.66%)

== 2019 Results ==
2014: 1 x DUP, 1 x Alliance, 1 x Sinn Féin, 1 x SDLP, 1 x UUP

2019: 1 x DUP, 1 x Alliance, 1 x Sinn Féin, 1 x SDLP, 1 x Green

2014-2019 Change: Green gain from UUP

Botanic - 5 seats
Party	Candidate	FPv%	Count										
Party	Candidate	FPv%	1	2	3	4	5	6	7	8	9	10	11
Green (NI)	Áine Groogan	14.39%	1,401	1,419	1,423	1,436	1,447	1,632					
DUP	Tracy Kelly	14.02%	1,365	1,389	1,498	1,498	1,579	1,582	1,665				
Sinn Féin	Deirdre Hargey* †	13.61%	1,325	1,332	1,332	1,510	1,512	1,556	1,558	1,639			
Alliance	Emmet McDonough-Brown*	11.74%	1,143	1,155	1,158	1,167	1,170	1,232	1,301	1,432	1,433.77	1,437.68	2,118.68
SDLP	Gary McKeown	10.36%	1,009	1,020	1,021	1,039	1,042	1,091	1,119	1,363	1,363	1,372.2	1,500.12
DUP	Graham Craig*	6.32%	615	633	653	653	700	702	829	878	916.35	916.58	931.17
Alliance	Micky Murray	7.74%	754	755	758	762	765	786	824	902	902.59	903.97	
Independent	Declan Boyle*	6.25%	609	612	613	616	623	634	663				
UUP	Richard Kennedy	3.42%	333	341	363	363	437	445					
People Before Profit	Paul Loughran	3.93%	383	415	418	420	422						
South Belfast Unionists	Billy Dickson	2.39%	233	247	256	256							
Sinn Féin	Caitríona Mallaghan	2.35%	229	229	229								
PUP	Ian Shanks	1.75%	170	178									
Workers' Party	Paddy Lynn	0.89%	87										
TUV	John Hiddleston	0.84%	82										
Electorate: 21,987 Valid: 9,738 (44.29%) Spoilt: 104 Quota: 1,624 Turnout: 9,842 (44.76%)

== 2014 Results ==
2014: 1 x DUP, 1 x Alliance, 1 x Sinn Féin, 1 x SDLP, 1 x UUP

Botanic - 5 seats
Party	Candidate	FPv%	Count										
Party	Candidate	FPv%	1	2	3	4	5	6	7	8	9	10	11
DUP	Ruth Patterson* ‡–	14.10%	1,268	1,268	1,280	1,282	1,284	1,508					
Alliance	Emmet McDonough-Brown	9.37%	843	850	865	881	925	925	1,011	1,061	1,065	1,706	
Sinn Féin	Deirdre Hargey*	14.74%	1,326	1,343	1,346	1,370	1,377	1,378	1,393	1,479	1,483	1,520	
SDLP	Declan Boyle ‡	10.80%	971	978	983	992	1,007	1,009	1,034	1,344	1,347	1,405	1,473.4
UUP	Graham Craig ‡	8.52%	766	767	795	798	808	858	897	900	1,333	1,357	1,380.6
Green (NI)	Clare Bailey	8.58%	772	792	806	860	876	879	973	994	1,010	1,141	1,253.8
Alliance	Duncan Morrow	8.55%	769	770	775	787	812	815	878	929	939		
TUV	Billy Dickson	5.66%	509	509	516	519	521	579	588	593			
SDLP	Patrick McCarthy*	5.89%	530	545	552	559	565	565	576				
NI21	Eileen Chan-Hu	2.90%	261	264	271	278	398	400					
PUP	Ewan Suttie	3.90%	351	351	353	356	357						
NI21	Ben Matthews	2.59%	233	235	247	254							
Socialist Party	Paddy Meehan	1.82%	164	172	173								
NI Conservatives	Ben Manton	1.39%	125	127									
Workers' Party	Paddy Lynn	1.18%	106										
Electorate: 19,462 Valid: 8,994 (46.21%) Spoilt: 192 Quota: 1,500 Turnout: 9,186 (47.20%)
