= Reginald Magee =

Politician from Northern Ireland (born 1914)

Reggie Magee

Member of the Northern Ireland Assembly for Belfast South
- In office 1973–1974

Personal details
- Born: 18 August 1914 Belfast, Ireland
- Died: 16 December 1989 (aged 75)
- Party: Ulster Unionist Party (1946 - 1974)
- Other political affiliations: Unionist Party NI (from 1974)
- Spouse: Gwladys Chapman (m. 1945)
- Children: 2
- Education: Campbell College; Queen's University Belfast

Reginald Arthur Edward Magee CBE (18 August 1914 - 16 December 1989), known as Reggie Magee, was a unionist politician and gynaecologist in Northern Ireland.

== Biography ==
Born in Belfast, Magee studied at Campbell College and then medicine at Queen's University Belfast. He worked as a gynaecologist at various hospitals in the city, becoming a Fellow of the Royal College of Surgeons of Ireland and of the Royal College of Obstetricians and Gynaecologists. He also held senior roles on the Northern Ireland Hospitals Authority, and lectured at Queen's University.

Magee joined the Ulster Unionist Party in 1946, and was elected in Belfast South at the 1973 Northern Ireland Assembly election, following which he became chairman of the unionist backbenchers. He stood again for the Northern Ireland Constitutional Convention, this time for the Unionist Party of Northern Ireland, but narrowly missed election.

Northern Ireland Assembly (1973)
New assembly	Assembly Member for Belfast South; 1973–1974	Assembly abolished
