= Christopher Stalford =

Northern Irish politician (1983–2022)

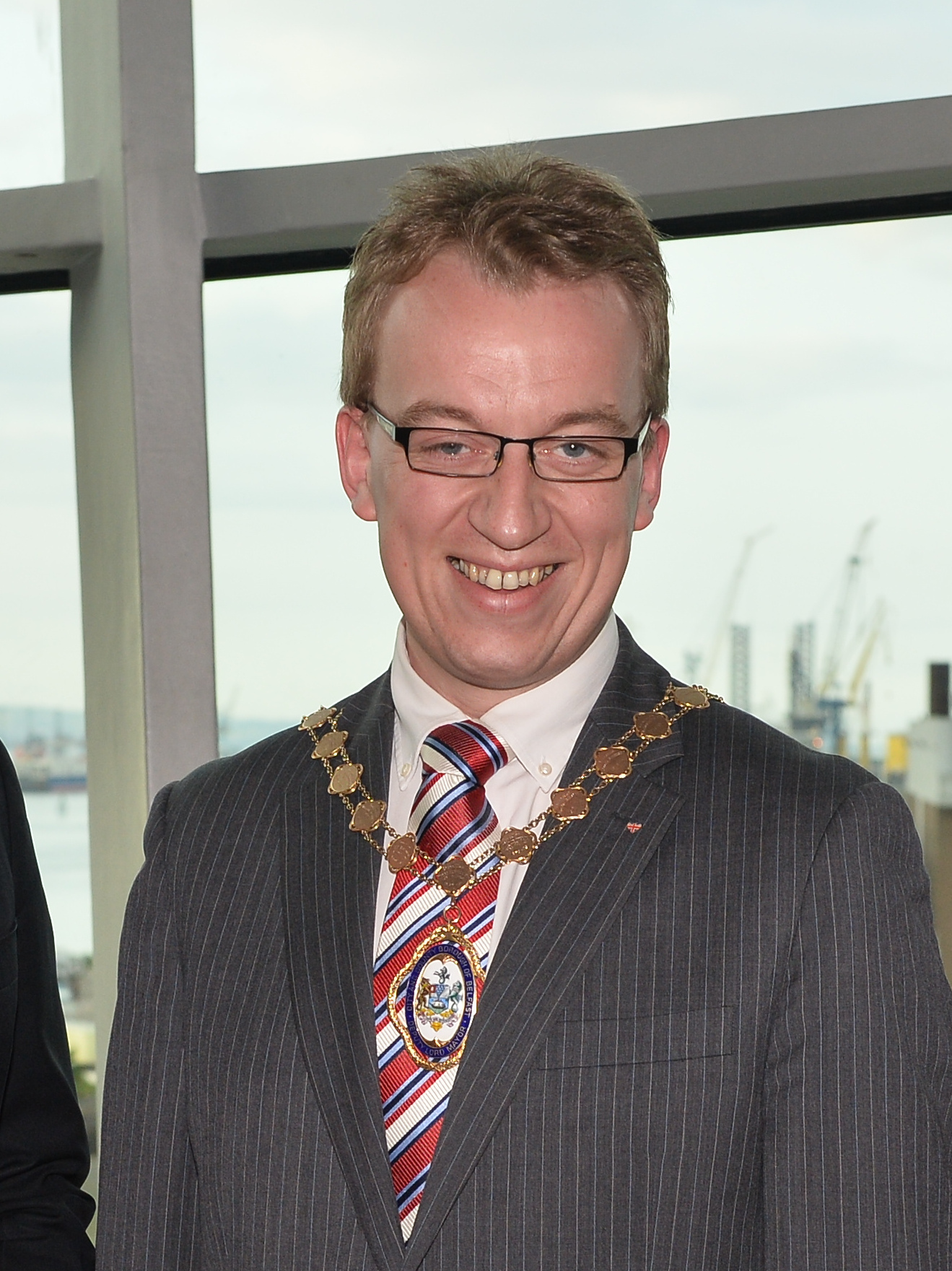

Principal Deputy Speaker of the Northern Ireland Assembly
- In office 14 January 2020 – 19 February 2022
- Preceded by: Catríona Ruane
- Succeeded by: Carál Ní Chuilín (2024)

Member of the Northern Ireland Assembly for Belfast South
- In office 5 May 2016 – 19 February 2022
- Preceded by: Michael McGimpsey
- Succeeded by: Edwin Poots

Deputy Lord Mayor of Belfast
- In office June 2013 – June 2014
- Preceded by: Tierna Cunningham
- Succeeded by: Máire Hendron

High Sheriff of Belfast
- In office January 2010 – January 2011
- Preceded by: Frank McCoubrey
- Succeeded by: Ian Adamson

Member of Belfast City Council
- In office 22 May 2014 – 5 May 2016
- Preceded by: Ruth Patterson
- Succeeded by: Lee Reynolds
- Constituency: Balmoral
- In office 5 May 2005 – 22 May 2014
- Preceded by: Jim Clarke
- Succeeded by: District abolished
- Constituency: Laganbank

Personal details
- Born: 17 January 1983 Belfast, Northern Ireland
- Died: 19 February 2022 (aged 39) Belfast, Northern Ireland
- Party: Democratic Unionist Party
- Spouse: Laura Stalford
- Children: 4
- Education: Wellington College Belfast; Queen's University Belfast

Christopher David Matthew Stalford (17 January 1983 – 19 February 2022) was a Northern Irish politician who was a Democratic Unionist Party (DUP) Member of the Northern Ireland Assembly (MLA) for South Belfast from the 2016 election until his death in 2022.

== Biography ==
Stalford was born in the Annadale Flats in south Belfast, on 17 January 1983. He studied nearby at Wellington College Belfast and Queen's University Belfast. After graduation he worked in the European office of Jim Allister three days a week, and the office of Peter Weir two days a week. He then moved to the DUP press office for six years and then onto the policy unit.

At the 2005 local elections, he was elected to Belfast City Council, representing the Laganbank area

At the 2014 local elections, Laganbank was abolished and he was re-elected for the Balmoral area.

Stalford served as High Sheriff of Belfast in 2010. Aged only 27, the Belfast Telegraph described him as the youngest ever High Sheriff of the city. He was elected as Deputy Lord Mayor for the 2013–14 term.

In 2008 he was selected as the chairman of the Belfast District Policing Partnership.

At the 2016 Northern Ireland Assembly election, he was one of two DUP candidates elected in South Belfast.

== Death ==
Stalford died suddenly on 19 February 2022, at the age of 39. While Stalford was described as "unionist to the core", his funeral was attended by a range of political parties including Sinn Féin colleagues John O'Dowd and Deirdre Hargey, SDLP MP Claire Hanna and Alliance Party leader Naomi Long.

When Edwin Poots was elected to Stalford's former constituency of Belfast South at the 2022 Assembly election, he paid tribute to Stalford and pledged to "build a legacy for Christopher".

Northern Ireland Assembly
Preceded by Michael McGimpsey	MLA for Belfast South; 2016–2022	Succeeded by Edwin Poots
Civic offices
Preceded by Frank McCoubrey	High Sheriff of Belfast; 2010	Succeeded by Ian Adamson
Preceded by Tierna Cunningham	Deputy Lord Mayor of Belfast; 2013–2014	Succeeded by Máire Hendron
