= Committee for Employment and Learning =

Northern Ireland Assembly committee

The Committee for Employment and Learning was a Northern Ireland Assembly committee established to advise, assist and scrutinise the work of the Department for Employment and Learning and Minister of Employment and Learning. The committee also played a key role in the consultation, consideration and development of new legislation.

The committee was abolished in 2016 because the Department of Employment and Learning was closed and its mandate was transferred to other departments.

== Membership ==
Membership before the closure of the Department of Employment and Learning:

Party	Member
Alliance	Anna Lo
DUP	Alex Easton
DUP	David Hilditch
DUP	William Irwin
DUP	Robin Newton (Deputy Chairperson)
Sinn Féin	Paul Butler
Sinn Féin	Claire McGill
Sinn Féin	Sue Ramsey (Chairperson)
SDLP	Alex Attwood
UUP	David McClarty
UUP	Rev Dr Robert Coulter

== See also ==
- Committee
