= Concerned Republicans =

Concerned Republicans, formed in December 2006, is an umbrella political groups which plans to run independent republican candidates in the 2007 Northern Ireland Assembly election on a manifesto of non-endorsement of the Police Service of Northern Ireland and would be anti-Good Friday Agreement and anti-St Andrews Agreement.

== Possible candidates ==
A number of figures have indicated their willingness to run as independent republican candidates in the forthcoming election, including:

- Peggy O'Hara (76), mother of Irish National Liberation Army (INLA) hunger striker Patsy O'Hara
- Paul McGlinchey, brother of murdered INLA leader Dominic McGlinchey
- Gerry McGeough, former Provisional Irish Republican Army volunteer, gunrunner and Sinn Féin Ard Comhairle member, from County Tyrone.
