= Ian Parsley =

Northern Irish businessman and politician

- Born: 3 May 1977 (age 49); Yorkshire, England
- Education: Merchant Taylors' School
- Alma mater: Newcastle University
- Political party: Alliance
- Other political affiliations: Ulster Conservatives and Unionists (2009-2010)
- Spouse: Paula Bradshaw (m. 2011)
- Children: 2
- Website: https://ianjamesparsley.wordpress.com/

Ian James Parsley (born 3 May 1977) is a businessman and former, part-time politician from Northern Ireland. He was the Alliance Party candidate at the 2009 European elections, and served as Deputy Mayor of North Down.

He attracted considerable criticism and caused much controversy by endorsing the Conservatives and Unionists link-up in 2009, but subsequently rejoined the Alliance Party in 2011. He is an outspoken opponent of Brexit.

== Background ==
Although of Northern Irish heritage on his mother's side, Parsley was born in Yorkshire and educated at Merchant Taylors' School and Newcastle University, graduating in Modern Languages.

Parsley currently works in public relations and research. He was a Director of Northern Ireland Screen. He was also Chair of the European Movement in Northern Ireland.

== Other activities ==
Parsley was a writer in and about Ulster Scots and, despite having run against her at the 2010 UK general election, he has campaigned alongside Sylvia Hermon on support for people with dementia and their carers.

== Personal life ==
Parsley has been married to Alliance MLA for Belfast South Paula Bradshaw since 2011. He is an avid Arsenal FC fan and an expert on Western European languages, a subject about which he often writes.
