= Paula Bradshaw =

Politician from Northern Ireland (born 1972)

Paula Bradshaw MLA
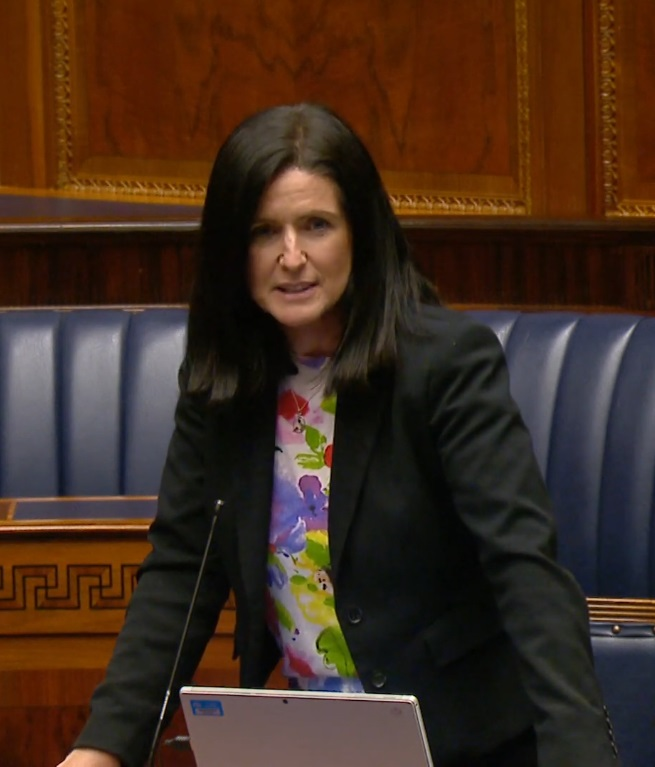
- Bradshaw in 2021

Member of the Northern Ireland Assembly for Belfast South
- Incumbent
- Assumed office 5 May 2016
- Preceded by: Anna Lo

Member of Belfast City Council
- In office 22 May 2014 – 7 May 2016
- Preceded by: Tom Ekin
- Succeeded by: Kate Nicholl
- Constituency: Balmoral

Personal details
- Born: 1 November 1972 (age 53)
- Party: Alliance (2010–present); Ulster Unionist (until 2010)
- Spouse: Ian Parsley (m. 2011)
- Children: 2
- Education: University of Ulster; Queen's University Belfast
- Occupation: Politician
- Profession: Community worker

Paula Jane Bradshaw (born 1 November 1972) is an Alliance Party of Northern Ireland politician. She has been a Member of the Northern Ireland Assembly (MLA) for South Belfast since the 2016 election and in 2024 was appointed Alliance Party Chief Whip.

== Early life and career ==
Bradshaw attended Whiteabbey Primary School and then Belfast High School. She subsequently completed a degree in European Business at Ulster University at Coleraine, before returning to study law and government part-time at the Jordanstown campus.

Following her graduation, Bradshaw spent a year in Sheffield working in market research, before returning to work for the South Belfast Traders Association. After three years, she took a position as an economic development officer with the South Belfast Partnership Board. In 2003, she became the director of Greater Village Regeneration Trust, where she remained until her election to the Assembly in 2016.

== Political career ==
Bradshaw contested the 2010 general election for the Ulster Conservatives and Unionists and was defeated by the SDLP's Alasdair McDonnell. In October 2010, she resigned her Ulster Unionist Party membership, a decade later telling the Belfast Telegraph in 2017, "I just couldn't stay in a party that's sexist, homophobic and sectarian so I resigned." She cited comments made by Ulster Unionist leader Tom Elliott, who said he would never attend Pride or a GAA match, as well as her treatment in a selection whereby members had questioned her ability to be an Assembly member as a working mother.

In November 2010, Bradshaw joined the Alliance Party. She first took public office when she was elected to Belfast City Council as a representative for the Balmoral electoral area in May 2014.

Bradshaw was selected to replace Anna Lo as the lead Alliance candidate for Belfast South in the 2016 Assembly elections, winning election with 9.1% of first-preference votes. In the 2017 snap Assembly election, she was re-elected with 13% of first-preferences. She currently serves as the Alliance Party's health spokesperson and, in 2020, was appointed Assembly Private Secretary at the Department of Justice to support Minister Naomi Long. She was re-elected at the 2022 election, at which the Alliance Party became the largest party in South Belfast for the first time and her running mate Kate Nicholl was also elected.

== Personal life ==
She is married to fellow Alliance Party activist Ian Parsley. It is her second marriage. In a 2017 Belfast Telegraph article about women in the public eye, Bradshaw spoke about her first marriage "I got married to Martin (43) when I was 26 and we were together for seven years. It was an acrimonious split." I had my first child at 27 and my second at 30.

Northern Ireland Assembly
Preceded by Anna Lo	MLA for Belfast South; 2016–present	Incumbent
