= Belfast South (Assembly constituency) =

Constituency in the Northern Ireland Assembly

Coordinates: 54°33′53″N 5°56′16″W

- Constituency for the Northern Ireland Assembly
- South Belfast shown within Northern Ireland

Current Constituency
- Created: 1973
- Seats: 6 (1998–2016); 5 (2017–)
- MLAs: Paula Bradshaw (APNI); Deirdre Hargey (SF); Kate Nicholl (APNI); Matthew O'Toole (SDLP); Edwin Poots (DUP)
- City council: Belfast City Council

Belfast South is a constituency in the Northern Ireland Assembly.

The seat was first used for a Northern Ireland-only election for the Northern Ireland Assembly, 1973. It usually shares boundaries with the Belfast South UK Parliament constituency, however the boundaries of the two constituencies were slightly different from 1983 to 1986 and 2010–2011 as the Assembly boundaries had not caught up with Parliamentary boundary changes and from 1996 to 1997 when members of the Northern Ireland Forum had been elected from the newly drawn Parliamentary constituencies but the 51st Parliament of the United Kingdom, elected in 1992 under the 1983–95 constituency boundaries, was still in session.

Members were then elected from the constituency to the 1975 Constitutional Convention, the 1982 Assembly, the 1996 Forum and then to the current Assembly from 1998.

The constituency is formed from the Belfast City Council districts of Balmoral and Botanic as well as one ward from Titanic and a number of wards from Lisnasharragh and Lisburn and Castlereagh. For further details of the history and boundaries of the constituency, see Belfast South (UK Parliament constituency).

== Members ==
Election	MLA (party)	MLA (party)	MLA (party)	MLA (party)	MLA (party)	MLA (party)
1973	Basil Glass (Alliance Party)	Basil McIvor (UUP)	Reginald Magee (UUP)	Herbert Kirk (UUP)	Nelson Elder (UUP)	Edward Burns (DUP)
1975	Basil Glass (Alliance Party)	Jim Hendron (Alliance)	Jeremy Burchill (UUP)	Martin Smyth (UUP)	David Trimble (Vanguard)	Edward Burns (DUP)
1982	David Cook (Alliance Party)	Edgar Graham (UUP)	Jim Kirkpatrick (UUP)	Martin Smyth (UUP)	5 seats 1982–1998	Raymond McCrea (DUP)
1984 by-election	David Cook (Alliance Party)	Frank Millar Jr (UUP)	Jim Kirkpatrick (UUP)	Martin Smyth (UUP)	5 seats 1982–1998	Raymond McCrea (DUP)
1996	Steve McBride (Alliance Party)	Alasdair McDonnell (SDLP)	Jim Clarke (UUP)	Bob Stoker (UUP)	5 seats 1982–1998	Joan Parkes (DUP)
1998	Monica McWilliams (NI Women's Coalition)	Alasdair McDonnell (SDLP)	Carmel Hanna (SDLP)	Esmond Birnie (UUP)	Michael McGimpsey (UUP)	Mark Robinson (DUP)
2003	Alex Maskey (Sinn Féin)	Alasdair McDonnell (SDLP)	Carmel Hanna (SDLP)	Esmond Birnie (UUP)	Michael McGimpsey (UUP)	Mark Robinson (DUP)
2007	Alex Maskey (Sinn Féin)	Alasdair McDonnell (SDLP)	Carmel Hanna (SDLP)	Anna Lo (Alliance Party)	Michael McGimpsey (UUP)	Jimmy Spratt (DUP)
January 2010 co-option	Alex Maskey (Sinn Féin)	Alasdair McDonnell (SDLP)	Conall McDevitt (SDLP)	Anna Lo (Alliance Party)	Michael McGimpsey (UUP)	Jimmy Spratt (DUP)
2011	Alex Maskey (Sinn Féin)	Alasdair McDonnell (SDLP)	Conall McDevitt (SDLP)	Anna Lo (Alliance Party)	Michael McGimpsey (UUP)	Jimmy Spratt (DUP)
September 2013 co-option	Alex Maskey (Sinn Féin)	Alasdair McDonnell (SDLP)	Fearghal McKinney (SDLP)	Anna Lo (Alliance Party)	Michael McGimpsey (UUP)	Jimmy Spratt (DUP)
October 2014 co-option	Máirtín Ó Muilleoir (Sinn Féin)	Alasdair McDonnell (SDLP)	Fearghal McKinney (SDLP)	Anna Lo (Alliance Party)	Michael McGimpsey (UUP)	Jimmy Spratt (DUP)
June 2015 co-option	Máirtín Ó Muilleoir (Sinn Féin)	Claire Hanna (SDLP)	Fearghal McKinney (SDLP)	Anna Lo (Alliance Party)	Michael McGimpsey (UUP)	Jimmy Spratt (DUP)
September 2015 co-option	Máirtín Ó Muilleoir (Sinn Féin)	Claire Hanna (SDLP)	Fearghal McKinney (SDLP)	Anna Lo (Alliance Party)	Michael McGimpsey (UUP)	Emma Little-Pengelly (DUP)
2016	Máirtín Ó Muilleoir (Sinn Féin)	Claire Hanna (SDLP)	Clare Bailey (Green (NI))	Paula Bradshaw (Alliance Party)	Christopher Stalford (DUP)	Emma Little-Pengelly (DUP)
2017	Máirtín Ó Muilleoir (Sinn Féin)	Claire Hanna (SDLP)	Clare Bailey (Green (NI))	Paula Bradshaw (Alliance Party)	Christopher Stalford (DUP)	5 seats 2017–present
January 2020 co-option	Deirdre Hargey (Sinn Féin)	Matthew O'Toole (SDLP)	Clare Bailey (Green (NI))	Paula Bradshaw (Alliance Party)	Christopher Stalford (DUP)	5 seats 2017–present
February 2022 co-option	Deirdre Hargey (Sinn Féin)	Matthew O'Toole (SDLP)	Clare Bailey (Green (NI))	Paula Bradshaw (Alliance Party)	Edwin Poots (DUP)	5 seats 2017–present
2022	Deirdre Hargey (Sinn Féin)	Matthew O'Toole (SDLP)	Kate Nicholl (Alliance Party)	Paula Bradshaw (Alliance Party)	Edwin Poots (DUP)	5 seats 2017–present

Note: The columns in this table are used only for presentational purposes, and no significance should be attached to the order of columns. For details of the order in which seats were won at each election, see the detailed results of that election.

== Elections ==
=== Northern Ireland Assembly ===
==== 2022 ====
2022 Assembly election: Belfast South – 5 seats
Party	Candidate	FPv%	Count							
Party	Candidate	FPv%	1	2	3	4	5	6	7	8
Sinn Féin	**Deirdre Hargey**	20.26%	**9,511**							
DUP	**Edwin Poots**	15.36%	7,211	7,217	7,223	7,341	**8,475**			
SDLP	**Matthew O'Toole**	11.49%	5,394	6,059	6,127	6,449	6,459	**8,089**		
Alliance	**Paula Bradshaw**	13.85%	6,503	6,768	6,828	6,963	6,994	7,150	**8,323**	
Alliance	**Kate Nicholl**	11.08%	5,201	5,347	5,405	5,536	5,553	5,743	6,656	**6,737**
Green (NI)	Clare Bailey	8.65%	4,058	4,225	4,395	4,886	4,934	5,046	5,700	5,826
UUP	Stephen McCarthy	6.52%	3,061	3,067	3,085	3,110	3,753	3,769		
SDLP	Elsie Trainor	4.32%	2,030	2,212	2,230	2,363	2,367			
TUV	Andrew Girvin	4.12%	1,935	1,935	1,944	1,980				
Aontú	Luke McCann	1.72%	806	877	892					
People Before Profit	Sipho Sibanda	1.34%	629	670	842					
Socialist Party	Neil Moore	0.75%	353	371						
Workers' Party	Paddy Lynn	0.30%	139	164						
Independent	Elly Odhiambo	0.23%	107	114						
Electorate: 73,497 Valid: 46,938 (63.86%) Spoilt: 368 Quota: 7,824 Turnout: 47,306 (64.36%)

==== 2017 ====
2017 Assembly election: Belfast South – 5 seats
Party	Candidate	FPv%	Count								
Party	Candidate	FPv%	1	2	3	4	5	6	7	8	9
Sinn Féin	**Máirtín Ó Muilleoir**	17.68%	**7,610**								
SDLP	**Claire Hanna**	15.23%	6,559	6,756.28	6,788.12	6,839.56	6,981.54	**8,652.54**			
Alliance	**Paula Bradshaw**	13.00%	5,595	5,632.26	5,672.5	5,740.4	5,866.38	**7,690.38**			
DUP	**Christopher Stalford**	10.52%	4,529	4,530.08	4,551.08	4,554.08	4,704.08	4,715.26	4,726.26	4,728.5	**8,667.5**
Green (NI)	**Clare Bailey**	9.86%	4,247	4,292.78	4,341.74	4,523.08	5,073.96	5,450	6,344	6,719.36	**6,797.22**
UUP	Michael Henderson	8.97%	3,863	3,866	3,932.12	3,955.12	4,240.2	4,337.8	4,647.8	4,761.4	5,255.94
DUP	Emma Little-Pengelly	10.33%	4,446	4,446.78	4,468.84	4,476.84	4,655.9	4,676.26	4,695.26	4,703.26	
Alliance	Emmet McDonough-Brown	4.77%	2,053	2,080.96	2,095.38	2,118.92	2,185.34				
SDLP	Naomh Gallagher	4.17%	1,794	1,855.86	1,865.92	1,893.42	1,962.22				
People Before Profit	Pádraigín Mervyn	1.77%	760	789.58	828.72	970.86					
TUV	John Hiddleston	1.63%	703	703.36	717.36	724.48					
Labour Alternative	Seán Burns	1.23%	531	539.76	566.42						
NI Conservatives	George Jabbour	0.46%	200	200.48							
Workers' Party	Lily Kerr	0.38%	163	168.22							
Electorate: 67,953 Valid: 43,053 (63.36%) Spoilt: 412 Quota: 7,176 Turnout: 43,465 (63.96%)

==== 2016 ====
2016 Assembly election: Belfast South – 6 seats
Party	Candidate	FPv%	Count											
Party	Candidate	FPv%	1	2	3	4	5	6	7	8	9	10	11	12
Sinn Féin	**Máirtín Ó Muilleoir**	14.18%	5,207	5,208	5,234	5,245	**5,247**							
Alliance	**Paula Bradshaw**	9.07%	3,332	3,352	3,369	3,400	3,418	3,425	3,437	3,570	**5,729**			
SDLP	**Claire Hanna**	12.30%	4,516	4,522	4,559	4,574	4,581	4,582	4,591	4,738	4,934	5,056.5	**7,641.5**	
Green (NI)	**Clare Bailey**	9.59%	3,521	3,534	3,600	3,670	3,678	3,691	3,707	4,289	4,524	4,729.5	4,932.75	**6,056.75**
DUP	**Emma Little-Pengelly**	12.28%	4,511	4,526	4,526	4,528	4,595	4,644	4,703	5,049	5,073	5,092.25	5,117	**5,150**
DUP	**Christopher Stalford**	9.72%	3,570	3,582	3,582	3,583	3,615	3,717	3,866	4,355	4,368	4,373.25	4,389.25	**4,409.25**
UUP	Rodney McCune	6.72%	2,466	2,514	2,515	2,527	2,615	2,677	2,755	3,213	3,272	3,337.5	3,367.5	3,449.5
SDLP	Fearghal McKinney	7.75%	2,845	2,850	2,869	2,876	2,877	2,878	2,878	2,964	3,057	3,104.75		
Alliance	Duncan Morrow	7.33%	2,691	2,698	2,707	2,730	2,733	2,736	2,744	2,837				
UKIP	Bob Stoker	2.16%	794	801	803	804	832	908	1,025					
Labour Alternative	Seán Burns	2.37%	871	871	909	971	974	985	989					
TUV	John Hiddleston	1.35%	495	498	499	501	558	590	685					
Independent	Ruth Patterson	1.29%	475	478	479	481	502	571						
PUP	Ian Shanks	1.17%	430	432	435	438	444							
South Belfast Unionists	William Dickson	0.96%	351	357	358	359								
NI Labour	Brigitte Anton	0.67%	246	248	258									
Workers' Party	Lily Kerr	0.66%	241	241										
NI Conservatives	Ben Manton	0.44%	161											
Electorate: 68,469 Valid: 36,723 (53.63%) Spoilt: 424 Quota: 5,247 Turnout: 37,147 (54.25%)

==== 2011 ====
2011 Assembly election: Belfast South – 6 seats
Party	Candidate	FPv%	Count				
Party	Candidate	FPv%	1	2	3	4	5
Alliance	**Anna Lo**	19.78%	**6,390**				
SDLP	**Alasdair McDonnell**	14.01%	4,527	**4,916.1**			
UUP	**Michael McGimpsey**	9.25%	2,988	3,208.8	3,241.05	3,322.95	**4,622.05**
Sinn Féin	**Alex Maskey**	12.50%	4,038	4,124.7	4,138.45	4,268.15	**4,452.05**
SDLP	**Conall McDevitt**	9.88%	3,191	3.510.5	3,687.25	3,852.1	**4,444.8**
DUP	**Jimmy Spratt**	12.52%	4,045	4,098.7	4,103.45	4,163.85	**4,281.45**
DUP	Ruth Patterson	11.76%	3,800	3,887	3,893.75	3,953.05	4,163.4
Green (NI)	Clare Bailey	2.75%	889	1,226.8	1,263.55	1,655.6	
UUP	Mark Finlay	4.31%	1,394	1,554.5	1,567	1,617.7	
People Before Profit	Brian Faloon	1.28%	414	475.8	480.05		
Socialist Party	Paddy Meehan	0.72%	234	252	255		
UKIP	Nico Torregrosa	0.72%	234	244.5	245		
Workers' Party	Paddy Lynn	0.42%	135	155.4	158.9		
Independent	Charles Smyth	0.09%	29	33.5	33.5		
Electorate: 62,484 Valid: 32,308 (51.71%) Spoilt: 444 Quota: 4,616 Turnout: 32,752 (52.42%)

Note: Charles Smyth sought election as a Procapitalism candidate, and appeared as such on the ballot paper.

==== 2007 ====
2007 Assembly election: South Belfast – 6 seats
Party	Candidate	FPv%	Count									
Party	Candidate	FPv%	1	2	3	4	5	6	7	8	9	10
DUP	**Jimmy Spratt**	15.69%	**4,762**									
SDLP	**Alasdair McDonnell**	14.43%	**4,379**									
Alliance	**Anna Lo**	12.62%	3,829	3,831	3,833.79	3,852.79	3,907.88	3,955.92	4,046.05	**4,415.05**		
UUP	**Michael McGimpsey**	8.72%	2,647	2,656.2	2,657.16	2,663.26	2,686.27	2,691.28	2,801.6	2,836.6	3,472.39	**4,927.39**
SDLP	**Carmel Hanna**	12.35%	3,748	3,748.64	3,779.94	3,785.94	3,815.07	3,849.1	3,856.13	4,063.46	4,076.58	**4,262.27**
Sinn Féin	**Alex Maskey**	13.17%	3,996	3,996	4,002.42	4,004.43	4,022.48	4,052.48	4,064.51	4,152.55	4,161.56	**4,166.66**
DUP	Christopher Stalford	6.71%	2,035	2,387.4	2,387.5	2,397.58	2,409.58	2,420.66	2,656.03	2,684.04	2,932.17	3,274.54
UUP	Esmond Birnie	5.95%	1,804	1,807.2	1,807.46	1,807.46	1,826.54	1,837.55	1,920.03	1,958.13	2,251.51	
UUP	Bob Stoker	3.70%	1,122	1,131.44	1,131.56	1,134.56	1,137.56	1,142.56	1,253.97	1,268		
Green (NI)	Brenda Cooke	2.43%	737	737	737.45	763.47	786.5	875.54	906.71			
PUP	Andrew Park	1.35%	410	412	412.56	415.56	424.58	435.58				
UK Unionist	David Hoey	0.98%	298	299.04	299.1	302.1	309.1	322.1				
Socialist Party	Jim Barbour	0.82%	248	248.08	248.23	253.23	277.23					
Workers' Party	Patrick Lynn	0.41%	123	123.08	123.38	126.38						
NI Conservatives	Roger Lomas	0.36%	108	108	108.05	108.05						
Make Politicians History	Rainbow George	0.22%	66	66	66.03							
Independent	Charles Smyth	0.07%	22	22.16	22.17							
Independent	Geoffrey Wilson	0.03%	10	10	10.01							
Electorate: 48,923 Valid: 30,344 (62.02%) Spoilt: 189 Quota: 4,335 Turnout: 30,533 (62.41%)

==== 2003 ====
2003 Assembly election: South Belfast – 6 seats
Party	Candidate	FPv%	Count											
Party	Candidate	FPv%	1	2	3	4	5	6	7	8	9	10	11	12
UUP	**Michael McGimpsey**	17.20%	**5,389**											
DUP	**Mark Robinson**	12.74%	3,991	4,024.32	4,024.32	4,025.32	4,039.66	4,048.83	4,150.87	4,155.21	4,246.82	4,268.16	**6,661.16**	
UUP	**Esmond Birnie**	7.38%	2,311	2,862.99	2,862.99	2,865.99	2,922.18	2,938.69	3,038.09	3,088.11	3,871.31	4,312.49	**4,536.49**	
SDLP	**Carmel Hanna**	12.48%	3,910	3,922.92	3,925.92	3,935.92	3,953.09	3,982.26	3,990.77	4,056.3	4,062.68	4,332.7	4,337.55	**4,404.55**
Sinn Féin	**Alex Maskey**	12.55%	3,933	3,935.55	3,937.55	3,947.55	3,968.55	3,987.55	3,989.55	3,991.55	3,991.55	4,003.55	4,011.55	**4,012.55**
SDLP	**Alasdair McDonnell**	10.30%	3,266	3,283	3,287	3,307	3,317.34	3,340.34	3,350.51	3,381.02	3,389.55	3,589.1	3,599.97	**3,649.97**
NI Women's Coalition	Monica McWilliams	6.86%	2,150	2,180.43	2,185.43	2,203.43	2,248.43	2,387.6	2,431.13	2,518	2,542.23	3,168.48	3,208.54	3,522.54
DUP	Ruth Patterson	8.10%	2,538	2,556.7	2,556.7	2,556.7	2,576.04	2,580.04	2,680.25	2,683.42	2,818.67	2,838.84		
Alliance	Geraldine Rice	3.78%	1,185	1,198.94	1,201.94	1,202.94	1,214.94	1,269.94	1,284.62	1,747.34	1,762.72			
UUP	John Hiddleston	2.45%	769	968.75	969.75	970.92	990.6	995.6	1,089.81	1,111				
Alliance	Tom Ekin	2.12%	664	672.5	673.5	678.5	698.18	726.35	739.86					
PUP	Thomas Morrow	1.58%	495	509.62	509.62	511.62	520.62	528.62						
Green (NI)	John Wright	0.98%	308	309.19	325.36	330.36	367.53							
Socialist Party	Jim Barbour	0.53%	167	168.19	170.19	181.19								
NI Conservatives	Roger Lomas	0.37%	116	119.06	120.06	120.06								
Workers' Party	Patrick Lynn	0.31%	96	96.17	97.17									
Rainbow Dream Ticket	Lindsay Steven	0.13%	42	42.17										
Electorate: 50,707 Valid: 31,330 (61.79%) Spoilt: 407 Quota: 4,476 Turnout: 31,737 (62.59%)

==== 1998 ====
1998 Assembly election: South Belfast – 6 seats
Party	Candidate	FPv%	Count									
Party	Candidate	FPv%	1	2	3	4	5	6	7	8	9	10
UUP	**Michael McGimpsey**	12.13%	4,938	5,032	5,183	5,358	**5,898**					
SDLP	**Alasdair McDonnell**	12.17%	4,956	5,039	5,042	5,059	5,073	**5,963**				
DUP	**Mark Robinson**	7.05%	2,872	2,940	3,484	3,629	3,779	3,781	4,351	**6,524**		
UUP	**Esmond Birnie**	7.06%	2,875	2,980	3,065	3,499	4,389	4,392	5,267	**5,881**		
NI Women's Coalition	**Monica McWilliams**	9.61%	3,912	4,053	4,067	4,112	4,157	4,675	5,077	5,118	5,238	**5,277.27**
SDLP	**Carmel Hanna**	9.53%	3,882	3,923	3,927	3,954	3,968	4,791	4,851	4,866	4,891	**4,982.63**
Alliance	Steve McBride	10.03%	4,086	4,187	4,203	4,236	4,331	4,374	4,616	4,670	4,826	4,832.46
DUP	Myreve Chambers	6.01%	2,449	2,505	3,011	3,205	3,314	3,318	3,510			
PUP	Ernie Purvis	5.19%	2,112	2,187	2,230	2,721	2,823	2,855				
Sinn Féin	Sean Hayes	6.40%	2,605	2,627	2,627	2,653	2,654					
UUP	Jim Clarke	4.22%	1,720	1,793	1,916	2,057						
Ulster Democratic	David Adams	4.28%	1,745	1,796	1,855							
UK Unionist	Grant Dillon	3.67%	1,496	1,579								
Ind. Unionist	William Dickson	1.07%	437									
Labour Party NI	Boyd Black	0.57%	231									
Workers' Party	Patrick Lynn	0.43%	176									
NI Conservatives	Roger Lomas	0.24%	97									
Natural Law	James Anderson	0.18%	73									
Independent Labour	Niall Cusack	0.15%	62									
Electorate: 61,209 Valid: 40,724 (66.53%) Spoilt: 542 Quota: 5,818 Turnout: 41,266 (67.42%)

=== 1996 forum ===
Successful candidates are shown in bold.

Party	Candidate(s)	Votes	Percentage
UUP	**Bob Stoker**; **Jim Clarke**; Michael McGimpsey; Drew Nelson; Gordon Lucy	8,617	22.8
SDLP	**Alasdair McDonnell**; Peter O'Reilly; Carmel Hanna; Douglas Arthur Hegney; Rosaleen Hughes	7,956	21.0
DUP	**Joan Parkes**; Thomas Scott; John Norris	5,818	15.4
Alliance	**Steve McBride**; Philip McGarry; Margaret Marshall	4,689	12.4
Sinn Féin	Sean Hayes; Sean Clinton; Deborah Moore	2,455	6.5
PUP	Dawn Purvis; Victor Murphy	2,321	6.1
UK Unionist	Patrick Roche; Kate Garrett	1,750	4.6
Ulster Democratic	David Adams; Pauline Gilmore	1,666	4.4
NI Women's Coalition	Kate Fearon; Annie Campbell; Barbara McCabe; Clare McLaughlin; Fidelma O'Gorman	947	2.5
Labour coalition	Peter Hadden; Eleanor Rogers; Niall Cusack; Neil House; Maeve Cross	333	0.9
Green (NI)	Mary Carberry; Jane Carney; Owen Clarke; Andy Frew	314	0.8
NI Conservatives	Myrtle Boal; Alan McKelvey	279	0.7
Workers' Party	Paddy Lynn; Ian Foster	270	0.7
Democratic Partnership	Paul Smyth; Alison Wilson	133	0.4
Ulster Independence	Gordon Smyth; Samuel Stevenson	108	0.3
Democratic Left	Jean Craig; Chris Skillen	96	0.3
Ulster Christian Democratic	Austin Scallan; Martine McLaughlin; John McLaughlin; Brian McLaughlin; Margaret Gibson	31	0.1
Natural Law	James Anderson; Morris Ahmed	13	0.0
Independent Chambers	Bertha Burleigh; Mark Strain	5	0.0

=== 1984 by-election ===
1984 by-election: South Belfast – 1 Seat
Party	Candidate	FPv%	Count
Party	Candidate	FPv%	1
UUP	**Frank Millar Jr**	100.0%	Unopposed
Electorate: – Valid: Unopposed Spoilt: Unopposed Quota: Unopposed Turnout: Unopposed

=== 1982 ===
1982 Assembly election: South Belfast – 5 seats
Party	Candidate	FPv%	Count					
Party	Candidate	FPv%	1	2	3	4	5	6
UUP	**Martin Smyth**	35.59%	**13,337**					
Alliance	**David Cook**	17.39%	**6,514**					
DUP	**Stuart McCrea**	10.92%	4,091	4,695.2	4,859.68	**6,880.28**		
UUP	**Edgar Graham**	7.67%	2,875	5,210.18	5,369.71	5,407.71	5,734.08	**6,253.08**
UUP	**Jim Kirkpatrick**	3.01%	1,126	4,427.37	4,617.29	4,673.29	4,959.67	**5,415.67**
SDLP	Ben Caraher	8.92%	3,342	3,344.12	3,740.12	3,740.12	3,740.55	4,712.55
Alliance	Basil Glass	6.65%	2,493	2,643.52	3,260.01	3,274.01	3,293.36	
DUP	Cedric Wilson	5.63%	2,111	2,407.8	2,495.95			
Workers' Party	Gerard Carr	2.49%	933	938.83				
UUUP	Philip Moles	0.66%	248	322.73				
Communist	Barry Bruton	0.45%	168	169.59				
UUUP	James Scott	0.22%	82	239.41				
Ulster Liberal	Michael Warden	0.17%	65	89.38				
Ind. Unionist	William Clulow	0.17%	65	85.67				
Independent	Stuart Hall Raleigh	0.05%	19	20.59				
Electorate: 66,683 Valid: 37,469 (56.19%) Spoilt: 1,243 Quota: 6,245 Turnout: 38,712 (58.05%)

=== 1975 Constitutional Convention ===
1975 Constitutional Convention: Belfast South – 6 seats
Party	Candidate	FPv%	Count										
Party	Candidate	FPv%	1	2	3	4	5	6	7	8	9	10	11
UUP	**Martin Smyth**	31.50%	**15,061**										
Alliance	**Basil Glass**	16.65%	**7,961**										
UUP	**Jeremy Burchill**	8.85%	4,230	**7,751.1**									
Alliance	**Jim Hendron**	5.23%	2,499	2,535.85	3,473.29	3,482.81	4,282.48	4,287.65	4,464.74	**7,328.74**			
Vanguard	**David Trimble**	5.08%	2,429	4,398	4,403.18	4,637.96	4,742.38	5,147.02	5,216.57	5,226.48	**7,240.98**		
DUP	**Thomas Burns**	5.29%	2,529	3,405.7	3,412.84	3,733.02	3,836.7	4,965.12	5,042.36	5,053.86	6,117.42	6,134.07	**6,513.87**
Unionist Party NI	Reginald Magee	7.43%	3,552	3,818.75	3,862.43	3,908.77	4,076	4,131.7	5,718.02	5,778.61	5,947.76	6,423.86	6,447.71
Vanguard	Raymond Jordan	3.92%	1,874	2,732.55	2,736.05	2,906.57	2,995.6	3,282.28	3,350.53	3,364.57			
SDLP	Ben Caraher	6.41%	3,065	3,068.85	3,125.69	3,126.81	3,269	3,270.69	3,280.81				
Unionist Party NI	John Houston	3.55%	1,697	1,783.35	1,799.73	1,827.31	2,019.72	2,050.7					
DUP	Robert McNeice	2.75%	1,316	1,836.85	1,839.09	1,903.21	1,927.76						
NI Labour	Erskine Holmes	3.34%	1,599	1,682.05	1,716.49	1,726.01							
Electorate: 73,324 Valid: 47,812 (65.21%) Spoilt: 789 Quota: 6,831 Turnout: 48,601 (66.28%)

=== 1973 ===
1973 Assembly election: South Belfast – 6 seats
Party	Candidate	FPv%	Count															
Party	Candidate	FPv%	1	2	3	4	5	6	7	8	9	10	11	12	13	14	15	16
UUP	**Basil McIvor**	13.14%	6,930	6,940	6,958	6,959	6,981	7,003	7,120	7,152	7,191	7,385	**8,185**					
Alliance	**Basil Glass**	9.76%	5,148	5,244	5,367	5,404	5,848	5,852	5,876	7,305	7,309	7,393	7,441	**9,025**				
DUP	**Thomas Burns**	8.80%	4,640	4.640	4.641	4,641	4,644	4,779	4,872	4,874	6,343	6,893	6,986	7,103	7,133	**10,436**		
UUP	**Nelson Elder**	9.12%	4,807	4,810	4,815	4,815	4,821	4,840	4,909	4,917	4,965	6,110	6,610	6,835	6,978	7,287	**8,044**	
UUP	**Herbert Kirk**	10.29%	5,426	5,429	5,435	5,439	5,447	5,465	5,610	5,620	5,653	6,009	6,605	6,838	7,038	7,297	**7,663**	
UUP	**Reginald Magee**	6.93%	3,656	3,661	3,666	3,666	3,676	3,696	3,835	3,854	3,895	4,042	5,051	5,235	5,417	5,603	6,039	**6,690**
SDLP	Ben Caraher	6.30%	3,320	3,326	3,414	3,779	3,799	3,800	3,802	3,980	3,982	3,999	4,000	4,575	5,018	5,029	5,037	5,038
Vanguard	Martin Gowdy	4.62%	2,434	2,434	2,436	2,438	2,442	3,208	3,273	3,277	3,865	4,082	4,170	4,272	4,283			
NI Labour	Erskine Holmes	5.09%	2,684	2,699	2,833	2,950	2,996	3,003	3,038	3,155	3,168	3,241	3,292					
UUP	Robert Stewart	5.41%	2,850	2,853	2,859	2,861	2,868	2,886	3,010	3,017	3,074	3,218						
Ind. Unionist	Grace Bannister	4.81%	2,538	2,540	2,553	2,554	2,568	2,584	2,900	2,918	2,992							
DUP	Thomas Wright	4.05%	2,134	2,134	2,135	2,138	2,139	2,295	2,369	2,373								
Alliance	William McCollum	2.45%	1,294	1,446	1,525	1,545	1,834	1,835	1,848									
Ind. Unionist	Thomas Rea	2.28%	1,201	1,204	1,210	1,211	1,214	1,230										
Vanguard	Stanley Morgan	2.29%	1,205	1,205	1,205	1,205	1,206											
Alliance	Jean Graham	1.41%	743	810	869	885												
Republican Clubs	Sean Flynn	1.49%	783	784	794													
Ulster Liberal	Sheelagh Murnaghan	1.04%	548	560														
Alliance	John Somerville	0.72%	380															
Electorate: 75,990 Valid: 52,721 (69.38%) Spoilt: 928 Quota: 7,532 Turnout: 53,649 (70.60%)
