= Bairbre de Brún =

Irish Sinn Féin politician

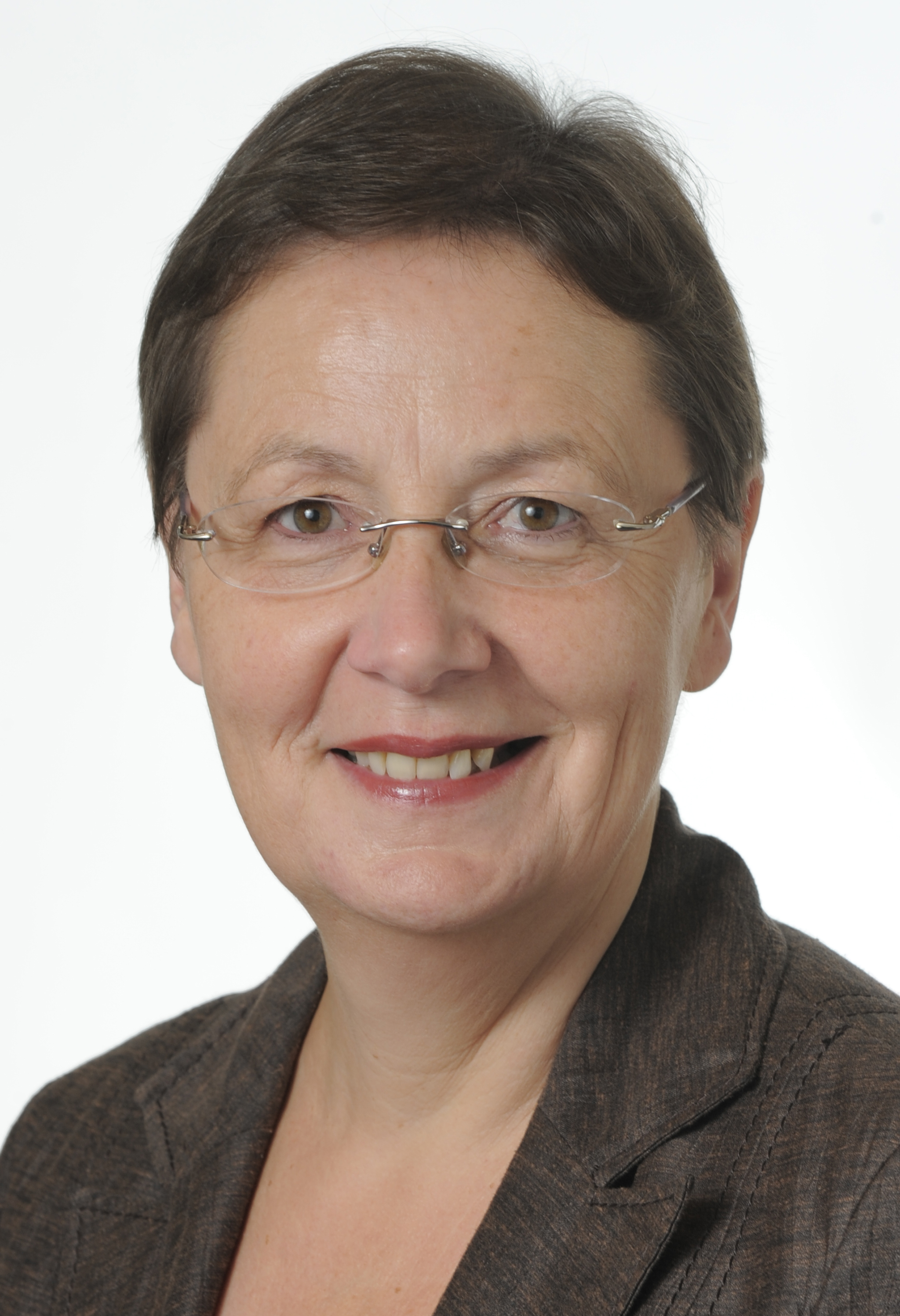

Member of the European Parliament for Northern Ireland
- In office 13 June 2004 – 3 May 2012
- Preceded by: John Hume
- Succeeded by: Martina Anderson

Minister for Health, Social Services and Public Safety
- In office 1999–2002
- Preceded by: Office Created
- Succeeded by: Michael McGimpsey

Member of the Northern Ireland Assembly for West Belfast
- In office 25 June 1998 – 13 June 2004
- Preceded by: Office created
- Succeeded by: Sue Ramsey

Personal details
- Born: 10 January 1954 (age 72) Dublin, Ireland
- Party: Sinn Féin
- Profession: Politician, teacher

Bairbre de Brún (born 10 January 1954) is a former Irish Sinn Féin politician who was a Member of the European Parliament (MEP) for Northern Ireland from 2004 to 2012.

== Political work ==
Born in Dublin on 10 January 1954, de Brún began her political career as a member of the National Committee Against the H-Blocks & Armagh Gaol in the late 1970s and early 1980s, focusing heavily on the treatment of women in Armagh Gaol. De Brún became an early member of Sinn Féin's Ard Chomhairle (English: High Council) and in 1998 became an MLA in the Northern Ireland Assembly, representing West Belfast. She was Minister of Health, Social Services and Public Safety.

By profession, de Brún was a teacher and taught in the Irish-medium education sector in west Belfast. She was also a French and German teacher and is noted for her devotion to the Irish language. She has lived in the Andersonstown area of Belfast since the early 1980s. She is a fluent Irish speaker and an expert in human rights and equality issues. De Brún is also a member of the Sinn Féin negotiating team and travelled internationally on numerous occasions to promote the Irish peace process.

She was a member of the Environment and Petitions Committee in the European Parliament and a substitute member of the Regional Development Committee. Following the 2004 Euro elections she was one of two Sinn Féin MEPs and the first Sinn Féin politician to represent Northern Ireland in the European Parliament. She sat with the European United Left - Nordic Green Left. She topped the poll in the Northern Ireland constituency of the European Parliament in the 2009 European elections, a first for a nationalist or republican party.

She has also been a strong supporter of the Irish language and its use globally, and was one of the only MEPs to use Irish as her primary language, rarely making speeches within the parliament in English.

De Brún was a member of the Regional Policy Committee in the European Parliament and a substitute member of the Environment Committee. Within the EU parliament she focused on environmental issues. She was part of an EU delegation that attended the 2011 Durban Climate Change Conference. She was critical of the final report of the conference saying "We need to recognise that even the best possible outcome from Durban still only takes us half way down the road we need to travel".

She resigned from the European Parliament in May 2012 for "personal reasons" although it was reported that she intended on remaining active within the party. She was succeeded by Martina Anderson, an MLA for Foyle.

Northern Ireland Assembly
New assembly	MLA for Belfast West; 1998–2004	Succeeded by Sue Ramsey
European Parliament
Preceded by John Hume	MEP for Northern Ireland; 2004–2012	Succeeded by Martina Anderson
Political offices
New office	Minister of Health, Social Services and Public Safety; 1999–2000	Vacant Office suspended Title next held by self
Vacant Office suspended Title last held by self	Minister of Health, Social Services and Public Safety; 2000–2002	Vacant Office suspended Title next held by Michael McGimpsey
