= Deirdre Hargey =

Northern Ireland politician (born 1980)

Deirdre Hargey MLA
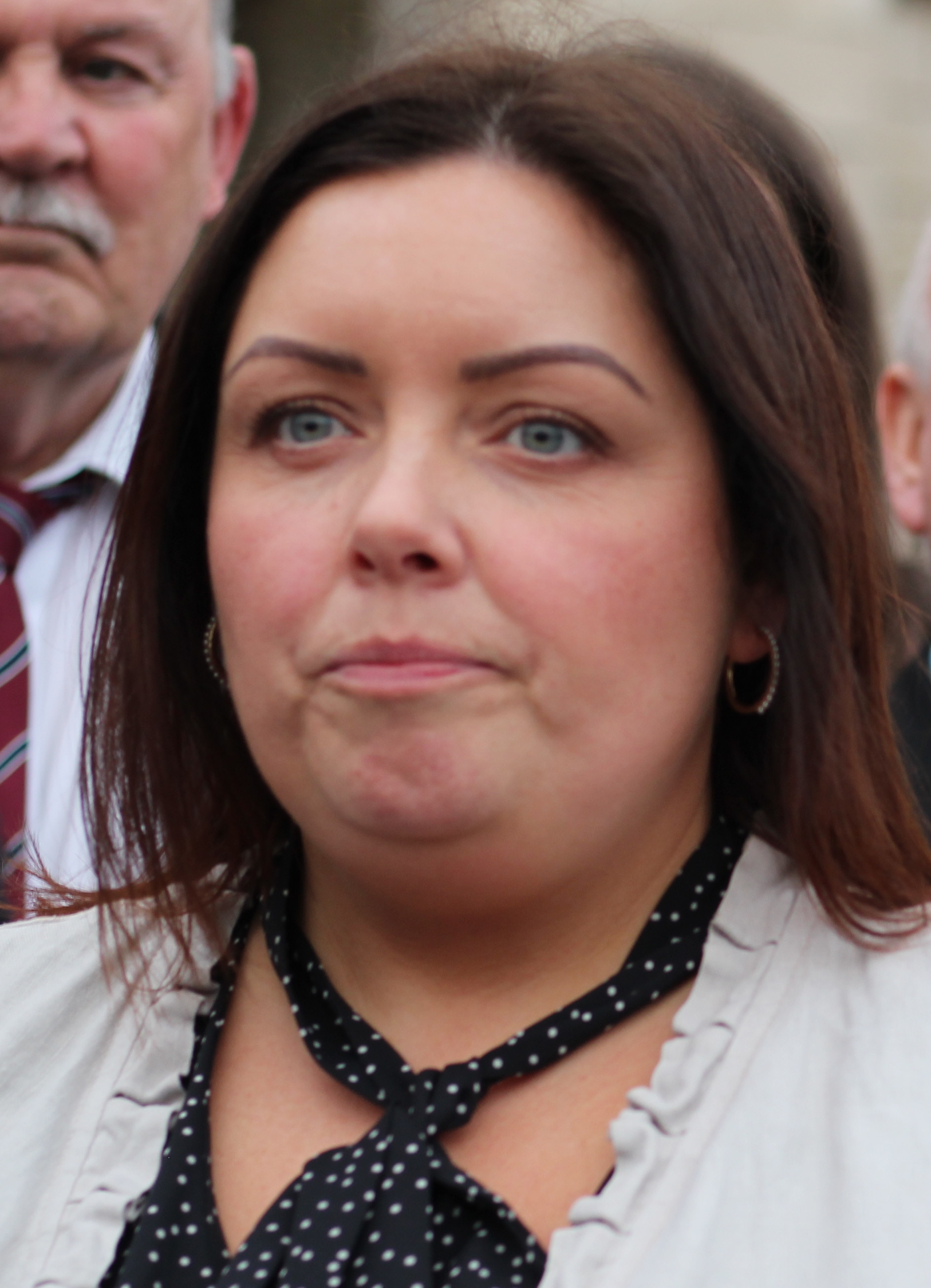

Minister for the Economy
- Interim; 8 May 2024 – 28 May 2024
- First Minister: Michelle O'Neill
- Preceded by: Conor Murphy
- Succeeded by: Conor Murphy

Minister for Communities
- In office 16 December 2020 – 27 October 2022
- First Minister: Arlene Foster; Paul Givan; Vacant
- Preceded by: Carál Ní Chuilín
- Succeeded by: Gordon Lyons (2024)
- In office 11 January 2020 – 14 June 2020
- First Minister: Arlene Foster
- Preceded by: Paul Givan (2017)
- Succeeded by: Carál Ní Chuilín

Member of the Northern Ireland Assembly for Belfast South
- Incumbent
- Assumed office 9 January 2020
- Preceded by: Máirtín Ó Muilleoir

75th Lord Mayor of Belfast
- In office 1 June 2018 – 1 June 2019
- Deputy: Emmet McDonough-Brown
- Preceded by: Nuala McAllister
- Succeeded by: John Finucane

Member of Belfast City Council
- In office 22 March 2014 – 9 January 2020
- Preceded by: District created
- Succeeded by: John Gormley
- Constituency: Botanic
- In office October 2010 – 22 May 2014
- Preceded by: Alex Maskey
- Succeeded by: District abolished
- Constituency: Laganbank

Personal details
- Born: 1980 (age 45–46) Belfast, Northern Ireland
- Party: Sinn Féin
- Occupation: Politician

Deirdre Hargey (born 1980) is an Irish Sinn Féin politician who has been a Member of the Northern Ireland Assembly (MLA) for Belfast South since 2020. She previously served as Lord Mayor of Belfast from 2018 to 2019, and as a Belfast City Councillor for the Botanic (formerly Laganbank) DEA from 2011 to 2020. Hargey was Minister for Communities from 2020 to 2022 and briefly served as interim Minister for the Economy in May 2024.

== Career ==
Hargey was first elected to Belfast City Council at the 2011 local elections, representing the Laganbank District. She was later re-elected to the successor Botanic District in 2014.

She was re-elected to Belfast City Council at the 2019 election.

Hargey was co-opted to the Northern Ireland Assembly in 2020, to replace Máirtín Ó Muilleoir. She was appointed as Minister for Communities at the formation of the 6th Executive on 11 January 2020. On 15 June 2020, Carál Ní Chuilín replaced her as minister on a temporary basis, due to Hargey's ill health.

On 8 May 2024, she was appointed as Minister for the Economy on a temporary basis, due to Conor Murphy standing down for medical reasons. She affirmed the pledge of office on 9 May 2024.

Hargey is the Sinn Fein justice spokesperson and the current Deputy Chair of the Northern Ireland Assembly Committee for Justice and also sits on the Committee for Finance.

Civic offices
Preceded by Nuala McAllister	Lord Mayor of Belfast; 2018–19	Succeeded by John Finucane
Northern Ireland Assembly
Preceded by Máirtín Ó Muilleoir	MLA for Belfast South; 2020–present	Incumbent
