= Jimmy Spratt =

Northern Ireland politician (1951–2021)

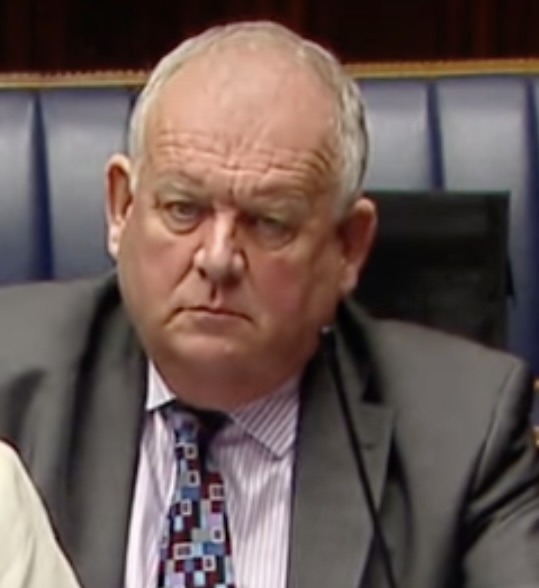
- Spratt in 2015

Member of the Northern Ireland Assembly for Belfast South
- In office 7 March 2007 – 28 September 2015
- Preceded by: Mark Robinson
- Succeeded by: Emma Pengelly

Personal details
- Born: James Andrew Spratt; 19 August 1951
- Died: 4 March 2021 (aged 69) Saintfield, County Down, Northern Ireland
- Party: Democratic Unionist Party
- Spouse: Lynda
- Children: 4
- Occupation: Politician
- Profession: Constable

James Andrew Spratt (19 August 1951 – 4 March 2021) was a Democratic Unionist Party (DUP) politician and police officer from Northern Ireland. He was a Member of the Northern Ireland Assembly (MLA) for South Belfast from 2007 to 2015.

== Early life ==
Spratt was a former Royal Ulster Constabulary (RUC) officer who joined in 1972 and served for 30 years in Derry and Belfast. He worked for the Close Protection Unit including as Primary Protection Officer and was attached to a former Secretary of State, NIO Ministers, the RUC Chief Constable and other VIPs.

He was heavily involved in the Police Federation for Northern Ireland and acted as Chairman. He served on Government Committees at regional and national level representing the British Police Service and has served on the Home Office Working Group for Health and Safety and Police Negotiating Board for pay and conditions across the UK.

== Political career ==
Spratt was an MLA for South Belfast in the Northern Ireland Assembly from 2007 to 2015. He was also a Councillor on Castlereagh Borough Council from 2005 to 2014, and served as the leader of the DUP group.

Political positions held:

- Councillor 2005—2014
- MLA 2007—2015
- Vice-Chairman of the Committee for Employment and Learning 2007—2008
- Member of the Committee of the Office of First and Deputy First Minister 2007—2015
- Chairman of the Assembly and Executive Review Committee 2008—2015?
- Member of the Northern Ireland Policing Board 2008—2011
- Chairman of the Regional Development committee 2011—2015?

He stood as a DUP candidate for the Belfast South constituency in the 2005 general election, losing his seat to Alasdair McDonnell of the SDLP by 1,235 votes. Gaining the name Splitter Spratt. In the 2010 general election he again lost, and McDonnell increased his majority from 3.9% to 17.3%.

== Other ==
When the chief executive of Translink was criticised for not appearing before Stormont's regional development committee, Spratt said that he did not think it was "a hardship for someone on £200,000" to appear before it and "explain what's going on".

Spratt made uncomplimentary and impolitic comments regarding cyclists and called those who objected to the proposals for the Maze 'nutters', which he denied until Hansard was published and he was obliged to apologise.

== Personal life ==
Spratt was married for over 30 years, with four sons and was an active member of his local Presbyterian church. He died on 4 March 2021, at the age of 69.

Northern Ireland Assembly
Preceded by Mark Robinson	MLA for Belfast South; 2007–2015	Succeeded by Emma Pengelly
