= Anna Lo =

Northern Irish politician (1950–2024)

Anna Lo MBE
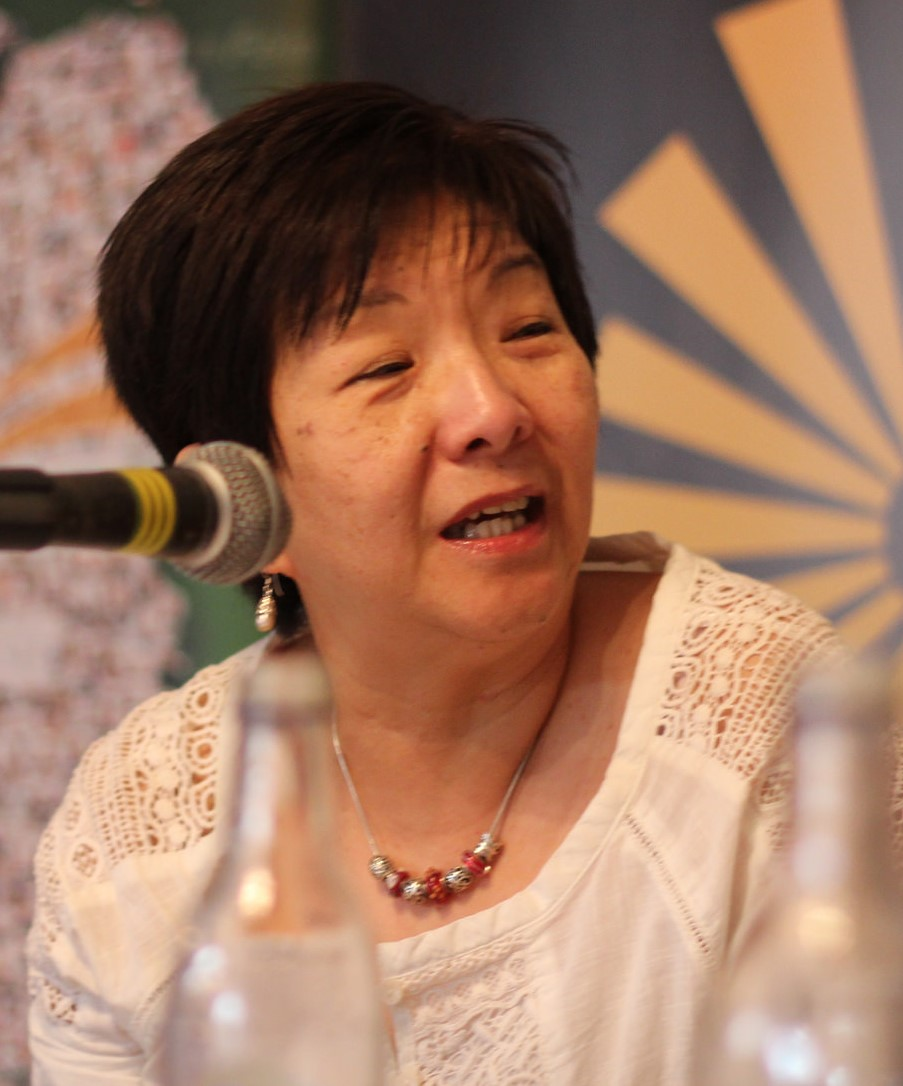
- Lo in 2014

Member of the Northern Ireland Assembly for Belfast South
- In office 7 March 2007 – 7 May 2016
- Preceded by: Esmond Birnie
- Succeeded by: Paula Bradshaw

Personal details
- Born: Anna Manwah Lo; 17 June 1950 North Point, British Hong Kong
- Died: 6 November 2024 (aged 74) Belfast, Northern Ireland
- Party: Alliance
- Spouse(s): David Watson (m. 1974; div. 2010) Gavin Millar (m. 2010; sep. 2012)
- Children: 2
- Education: Ulster University
- Profession: Social worker

Chinese name
- Traditional Chinese: 盧曼華
- Simplified Chinese: 卢曼华
Transcriptions
Standard Mandarin
- Hanyu Pinyin: Lú Mànhuá
Yue: Cantonese
- Jyutping: Lou4 Maan6 Waa4
- IPA: [lɔw˩ man˨wa˩]

Anna Manwah Lo, (Note: Alternatively:Anna Man-Wah Lo simplified Chinese: 卢曼华; traditional Chinese: 盧曼華; Jyutping: Lou4 Maan6 Waa4) or Anna Lo Man-wah, MBE (married name: Anna Watson; (Note: Sources:) 17 June 1950 – 6 November 2024) was a Northern Irish politician of the Alliance Party. She was a Member of the Legislative Assembly for Belfast South from 2007 to 2016 and was a former president of the Alliance Party.

She was the first parliamentarian of East Asian ethnicity to be elected to any parliament or national assembly in any part of the UK.

== Early life ==
Anna Manwah Lo was born in North Point, British Hong Kong, on 17 June 1950. Her parents were born in Mainland China and had moved to British Hong Kong in 1948, one year before the Chinese Civil War had ended. She attended Shau Kei Wan East Government Secondary School. She moved to Northern Ireland in 1974 after meeting journalist David Watson. Lo later graduated from Ulster University, becoming the first trained social worker of ethnic minority background in Northern Ireland.

She spent her early years in the country working for the BBC and the Royal Ulster Constabulary as an interpreter. In 1978 she started an English evening class for Chinese people in Northern Ireland.

== Political career ==
Lo was elected to the Northern Ireland Assembly for Belfast South in the 2007 assembly election. She was the first and, to date, only ethnic-minority politician elected at a regional level in Northern Ireland and the first politician born in East Asia elected to any legislative body in the United Kingdom.

Lo stood as an Alliance Party candidate in Belfast South. After her re-election in 2011, Lo was appointed the chair of the Northern Ireland Assembly's Environment Committee. She used this role to influence the Local Government Bill. As a result of her amendments, the new Councils have greater levels of openness and transparency as the audio of the main Council meetings is now recorded and Council papers are placed online. She further improved the freedom of the press at the new Councils by ensuring that journalists and the public can use social media during meetings. Lo was a former president of the Alliance Party and had been president from October 2016 to March 2017.

She was selected as the Alliance Party's candidate for the Northern Ireland constituency in the 2014 European Parliament election. She received the highest percentage of votes in a European Parliament election for her party until that election. Her performance was surpassed in 2019.

Lo was the target of racial abuse by Ulster loyalists and did not stand for re-election as MLA in 2016 as a result.

== Political views ==
Lo declared her preference for Irish unification. She described herself as anti-colonial and said the partition of Ireland was "artificial". Lo also referred to herself as "a socialist and a republican in the international sense".

She expressed her outrage at First Minister Peter Robinson's defence of Pastor James McConnell, who was accused of making Islamophobic remarks. She stated that she viewed the Democratic Unionist Party to be racist because of decisions such as those.

Lo supported moves to liberalise abortion laws in Northern Ireland and voted to extend the Abortion Act 1967, which already applies to the rest of the United Kingdom, to Northern Ireland.

== Personal life ==
Lo was a social worker and former chair of the Northern Ireland Chinese Welfare Association. She served from 1997 and was chair as of October 2019. Lo was appointed Member of the British Empire for services to Ethnic Minorities in the 2000 New Year Honours. She received an honorary doctorate from the Open University in October 2018.

Lo's autobiography, The Place I Call Home: From Hong Kong to Belfast – My Story, was published by the Blackstaff Press in October 2016.

Lo was married to Belfast Telegraph journalist David Watson from October 1974 until their divorce in 2010. Watson died in December 2010. She later married businessman Gavin Millar, getting engaged in June 2010 and separating in 2012. Lo had a partner named Robert and had 2 children and 2 grandchildren.

An atheist and a self-described humanist, she was a supporter of Humanists UK and its Northern Ireland branch, Northern Ireland Humanists. In 2015, she was the only MLA of seven non-religious MLAs who was willing to go public as an atheist in an interview with the BBC. She helped launch Northern Ireland Humanists at an event in Stormont in 2016 and supported many of the charity's campaigns, including on abortion rights.

=== Illness and death ===
From 2007, Lo suffered from non-Hodgkin lymphoma. She died of complications from NHL at the Belfast City Hospital on 6 November 2024, aged 74. In a statement, Alliance Party leader Naomi Long said "Anna will forever be remembered as a ground-breaker in local politics. Her service to the Chinese community (...) was transformational."

== Bibliography ==
- Lo, Anna (13 October 2016). The Place I Call Home: From Hong Kong to Belfast – My Story. Edited by Michelle Griffin for Colourpoint Books. Newtownards: Blackstaff Press. ISBN 0856409855, 978-0856409851 OCLC 953843693.
- Lo, Anna (3 March 2017). The Place I Call Home: From Hong Kong to Belfast – My Story. Kindle Edition. Newtownards: Blackstaff Press. ISBN 0856409952, 9780856409950 ASIN B06XCZYX9G.

== See also ==
- European politicians of Chinese descent

== Notes ==
Northern Ireland Assembly
Preceded by Esmond Birnie	MLA for Belfast South; 2007–2016	Succeeded by Paula Bradshaw
