= Esmond Birnie =

British economist, author and former unionist politician

Intertrade UK panel member
- Incumbent
- Assumed office 28 February 2025 Serving with Kirsty McManus, Suzanne Wylie, Roger Pollen and Angela McGowan
- Appointed by: Hilary Benn
- Chair: Baroness Foster of Aghadrumsee
- Preceded by: position established

Member of the Northern Ireland Assembly for Belfast South
- In office 25 June 1998 – 7 March 2007
- Preceded by: Belfast Agreement

Personal details
- Born: 6 January 1965 (age 61) Edinburgh, Scotland
- Party: Ulster Unionist Party
- Other political affiliations: NI Conservative (Pre 1998)
- Education: Cambridge University; Queen's University Belfast
- Profession: Economist; Academic

John Esmond Birnie (born 6 January 1965) is a British economist, author and former unionist politician. He was an Ulster Unionist Party (UUP) Member of the Northern Ireland Assembly (MLA) for Belfast South from 1998 until 2007.

== Background ==
Birnie was born in Edinburgh, Scotland. He attended Ballymena Primary School and later Ballymena Academy. He studied economics at Gonville and Caius College, Cambridge before completing a PhD at Queen's University Belfast.

He was an unsuccessful Conservative Party candidate in the elections to Belfast City Council for Balmoral in the 1993 Northern Ireland Local Election. In the 2005 Northern Ireland Local Election, he stood again for Balmoral, this time for the Ulster Unionist Party, and failed to get elected by 0.95 votes on the final count. Birnie was also second on the Conservative regional list for the 1996 Forum Election, but was not elected as the party was 12th most popular in electoral support, and only the top 10 parties were eligible for two top up seats.

He was elected to the Northern Ireland Assembly in 1998. During the Assembly he was Chairman of the Assembly's Employment and Learning Committee. He retained his seat in 2003 but lost it in the 2007 elections. He was then employed as a special advisor to Employment and Learning Minister, Sir Reg Empey.

He was Chief Economist for PricewaterhouseCoopers in Northern Ireland from 2010 to 2016. Since 2016 he has been a Senior Economist at the University of Ulster.

== Works ==
- John Bradley; J. Esmond Birnie (2001). Can the Celtic tiger cross the Irish border?. Cork University Press. ISBN 978-1-85918-312-0.
- Firm, Competitiveness and Environmental Regulations: A Study of the European Food Processing Industries by David Hitchens, Esmond Birnie, Angela McGowan, and Ursula Triebswetter (Hardcover - 28 October 1998)
- The Northern Ireland Economy: Performance, Prospects and Policy by Esmond Birnie and D.M.W.N. Hitchens (Hardcover - 23 February 1999)
- Environmental Regulation and Competitive Advantage: A Study of Packaging Waste in the European Supply Chain by David Hitchens, Esmond Birnie, William Thompson, and Ursula Triebswetter (Hardcover - 29 March 2000)

Northern Ireland Assembly
New assembly	MLA for Belfast South; 1998–2007	Succeeded by Anna Lo
