= Social Democratic and Labour Party leadership election =

Social Democratic and Labour Party leadership election may refer to:

- 2010 Social Democratic and Labour Party leadership election
- 2011 Social Democratic and Labour Party leadership election
- 2015 Social Democratic and Labour Party leadership election
- 2024 Social Democratic and Labour Party leadership election
