= Davy Payne =

Northern Irish loyalist (c.1949–2003)

- Born: c. 1949; Belfast, County Antrim, Northern Ireland
- Died: March 2003 (aged 53–54); Belfast, Northern Ireland
- Military career
- Allegiance: Ulster Defence Association
- Rank: Brigadier
- Nickname: "Psychopath"
- Units: North & West Belfast Brigade (1974–1988)
- Conflict: The Troubles

H. David Payne (c. 1949 – March 2003) was a Northern Irish loyalist and a high-ranking member of the Ulster Defence Association (UDA) during the Troubles, serving as brigadier of the North Belfast Brigade. He was first in command of the Shankill Road brigade of the Ulster Freedom Fighters (UFF), which was the "cover name" of the militant branch of the UDA. The group was responsible for a series of abductions and killings of mostly Catholic civilians in the early 1970s.

He was arrested after being stopped at a Royal Ulster Constabulary (RUC) checkpoint while driving the "scout" (lead) car for his UDA colleagues whose cars' boots contained large caches of weapons imported from Lebanon. He was convicted and sentenced to 19 years in prison.

== Ulster Defence Association ==
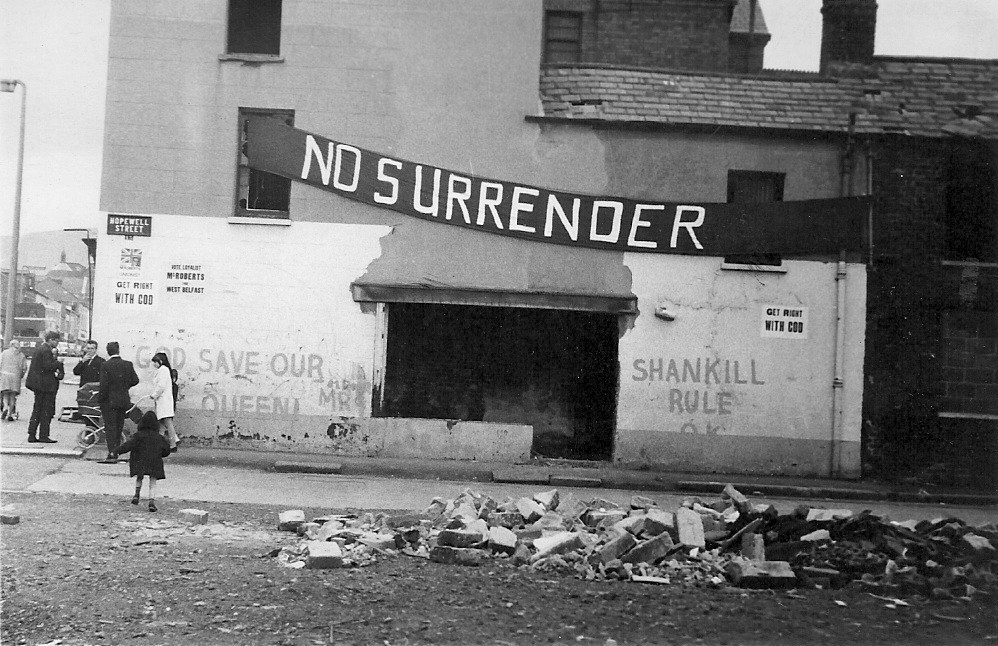
The Shankill Road neighbourhood of Belfast, as it appeared in the early 1970s. This was where Davy Payne grew up and then started commanded the Ulster Freedom Fighters.

Payne was born in Belfast and grew up in the loyalist Shankill Road area of West Belfast. His family belonged to the Free Presbyterian Church of Ulster. He remained a member of the church in adulthood and regularly attended services at the Martyrs' Memorial Church, the group's headquarters on the Ravenhill Road in south-east Belfast.

Payne was one of the original members of the Ulster Defence Association (UDA) when it was formed from Ulster loyalist vigilante groups in September 1971. These groups, including the Woodvale Defence Association (WDA) and Shankill Defence Association (SDA), had sprung up following the outbreak in the late 1960s of the violent politico-religious conflict known as the Troubles. Payne, who had been a supporter of Gusty Spence and had rioted in 1966 following Spence's arrest, had been a member of both the Ulster Volunteer Force and Tara but took his entire "team" over to the UDA upon that organisation's foundation.

As the civil disorder, rioting, and attacks carried out by the Provisional IRA escalated, many Ulster Protestants felt increasingly under threat, and the groups were created as a means of defending the status quo. These vigilante units merged in 1971 to become the UDA. Author Sarah Nelson stated that "the vigilantism of summer and autumn 1969 was one of the foundation stones of the Ulster Defence Association".

A former British Army paratrooper, Payne had been interned in the early 1970s. He became commander of the UDA's C Company, 2nd Battalion Shankill Road, West Belfast Brigade, afterwards he commanded the Shankill Road brigade of the Ulster Freedom Fighters (UFF), which was the "cover name" of the UDA's militant branch. Beginning in May 1972 (although the UFF was not "officially" formed until 1973), (Note: The Ulster Freedom Fighters were formed in 1973 as a "cover name" for the militant branch of the UDA, so the latter, who were then a legal organisation, could avoid being proscribed by the British government) as part of their violent, retaliatory campaign against the nationalist population who they believed was giving full support to the Provisional IRA, the group would abduct random Catholic men and women from nationalist areas, then beat, torture and kill them.

Payne was described as the UDA's most violent and feared killer, and was also a member of the Orange Order, belonging to the Old Boyne Island Heroes Lodge. Journalist Kevin Myers called him "one of the most ferocious savages in the history of Irish terrorism". Payne was said to have invented the notorious "romper rooms" where the UDA interrogated and tortured their victims. According to author Ian Wood, Payne was addicted to the use of knives and sadistically tortured his victims before killing them this earned him the nickname of "The Psychopath". Payne served as the UDA's "Provost-Marshall", the officer in charge of maintaining internal discipline.

Beginning in early 1973, there was an internal feud and power struggle within the UDA which would last until 1975. Its former leader, the West Belfast brigadier Charles Harding Smith, argued with Payne, and then ordered him off the Shankill Road on account of the latter's support of his rival, Andy Tyrie. Tyrie, who in 1973 had become UDA commander, retaliated against Harding Smith by promoting Payne to the rank of brigadier in 1974 and subsequently gave him command of the UDA's North Belfast Brigade. Although Tyrie was overall commander of the UDA, brigadiers in the organisation enjoyed a large degree of autonomy and regarded their own territory as "their personal fiefdoms". Payne was described by Wood as having been a friend of Tyrie.

Fellow UDA member Glenn Barr believed that Payne on one occasion had saved his life

I owe my life to Davy Payne because there had been a plan within a section of the UDA to have me killed because I had been part of a delegation which had gone to Libya to have talks with Colonel Gadafy [sic] in 1974. Davy Payne went to those people and told them I was under his protection and I have no doubt this saved my life.

== Alleged killings and attacks ==
On 21 July 1972, Payne, along with some of his UDA associates, allegedly carried out the double killing of Rosemary McCartney, a young Catholic singer from West Belfast, and her boyfriend, Patrick O'Neill. Earlier on this same day, the IRA had exploded 22 bombs in Belfast, killing nine people, and injuring 130. One of the dead included a member of the UDA, William Irvine (18). This day became known as Bloody Friday. The couple had been stopped at a UDA roadblock and taken to one of the "romper rooms" for a "grilling" (interrogation) which was presided over by Payne, who like his companions, wore a mask.

According to the journalist Kevin Myers, Payne supervised the beating and torturing of O'Neill, who was repeatedly burnt with cigarette butts. After a card was found in Rosemary McCartney's bag which identified her as a singer, Payne asked her whether she was in fact an actual singer. After the woman replied in the affirmative, Payne told her to "prove it". When she inquired how, he answered "by singing". McCartney was forced to sing in front of Payne and the others, then she and her boyfriend were subsequently forced into a car and shot to death, supposedly by Payne. Their bodies were discovered the following day in an abandoned car in Glencairn. McCartney had been shot three times in the face.

In June 1973, Payne reportedly took part in the double killing of Social Democratic and Labour Party Senator Paddy Wilson and his companion, Irene Andrews, a Protestant. Wilson had offered Andrews a lift home from a Belfast city centre pub. Following a telephone call to a newspaper from the UFF using their code name "Captain Black", Wilson and Andrews' mutilated bodies were found five hours later lying in pools of blood beside Wilson's car in a quarry off the Hightown Road. They had both been stabbed and hacked to death in what appeared to have been a frenzied attack. Wilson was stabbed a total of 30 times and his throat slashed from ear to ear; Andrews was knifed 20 times. The first-in-command of the UFF's Shankill Road brigade, John White was convicted of the crime after he had confessed to it in 1978. It was claimed that Payne would scream at those he wanted to frighten or intimidate: "Do you know who I am? I'm Davy Payne. They say I killed Paddy Wilson".

Payne was never convicted of any of the murders that were attributed to him. He established the reputation of the UDA/UFF's notorious C Company, 2nd Battalion Shankill Road, West Belfast Brigade. This would eventually come under the control of Johnny "Mad Dog" Adair, who looked up to Payne as the leading loyalist to take the war to the republican movement and a true hero to the loyalist people of Ulster.

RUC Special Patrol Group (SPG) officer John Weir alleged that Payne had been involved in the Dublin car bombings on 17 May 1974 in which 26 people in three city-centre explosions were killed.

In 2003, Weir's allegations that Payne, along with senior Ulster Volunteer Force (UVF) members, Billy Hanna and Robin Jackson, had led one of the UVF teams that bombed Dublin, were published in the Barron Report which were the findings of an official investigation into the bombings by Irish Supreme Court Justice Henry Barron. Payne, when questioned earlier, denied he had been involved in the car bombings, although he admitted to having met Weir in prison.

== Arrest and conviction ==
Payne left the UDA in the mid-1970s over the continuing allegations that he had misappropriated UDA funds. Away from the group he set up as a community worker and also set up a number of youth training schemes. These initiatives, many of which were of a cross-community nature, briefly saw Payne held up as an example of a reformed character and he was praised by the Peace People and invited to speak in Dublin. Payne's relationship with Tyrie was damaged due to a speech Payne made warning young men away from paramilitary involvement. In April 1978 his house was shot at by UDA members.

Soon after this attack, Payne's second career came to an end when he was investigated by a civil servant over allegations of fraud. However, rather than contest the allegations Payne closed down his operations and, having rebuilt his relationship with Tyrie, accepted his invitation to return as North Belfast Brigadier. Tyrie reportedly worried that the Brigade was making no money and also feared a small group of members who were carrying out a series of sectarian murders under their own steam and felt that Payne could restore order to the area. Payne was not popular with many local members, who resented his bullying techniques.

In the 1980s, persistent allegations of stealing UDA funds were levelled against him and he made many enemies within the organisation. The UDA also accused him of complicity in the assassination of South Belfast brigadier John McMichael, who was blown up in a booby-trap car bomb planted by the IRA outside his Lisburn home on 22 December 1987. In that same year, the police were aware that he was involved in an operation to steal weapons from an army base.

On 8 January 1988, he was arrested in Portadown after being stopped at an RUC checkpoint. At the head of a small convoy of vehicles, Payne was driving the "scout" car (an Austin Maestro) for his UDA colleagues whose own cars' boots contained the UDA's share of a large consignment of weapons which had been smuggled from Lebanon and destined for loyalist paramilitaries. The load consisted of 90 Browning pistols, 161 AK-47s, 250 grenades, 6 RPG 7'S, 184 magazines and 11,000 rounds of ammunition, along with 200 lbs of deadly lebanese semtex.

Fibres from Payne's clothing were found on the weapons, and his name had been used as a reference for hiring the cars. According to journalist Peter Taylor, there was no doubt at the time that he had been set up by an informer within the UDA. Payne was sentenced to 19 years in prison. He did not, however, serve the full sentence. His succession as brigadier was not a smooth one although after a disagreement, Tyrie relented and allowed the North Belfast members to promote their own man as Brigadier rather than an outside candidate who Tyrie had hoped to parachute in.

== Death ==
Payne died of a heart attack in March 2003 at the age of 54. A widower, he was survived by two sons. After a service held on 19 March 2003 at his home in Snugville Street off the Shankill Road, several hundred mourners and over tens of hundreds of his members attended his funeral. It was said that he had the largest show of strength ever to be on the Shankill Road. Three UFF gunmen fired AK47s and three young members of the UYM used handguns over his coffin outside his home in proper UDA military style. He was later cremated.

== Notes ==
Other offices
Preceded by ?	Ulster Defence Association Ulster Freedom Fighters North & West Belfast Brigadier; 1974–c.1976	Succeeded by ?
Preceded by ?	Ulster Defence Association Ulster Freedom Fighters North & West Belfast Brigadier; 1978–1988	Succeeded by Tom Reid
