= 2011 Social Democratic and Labour Party leadership election =

- 4–5 November 2011
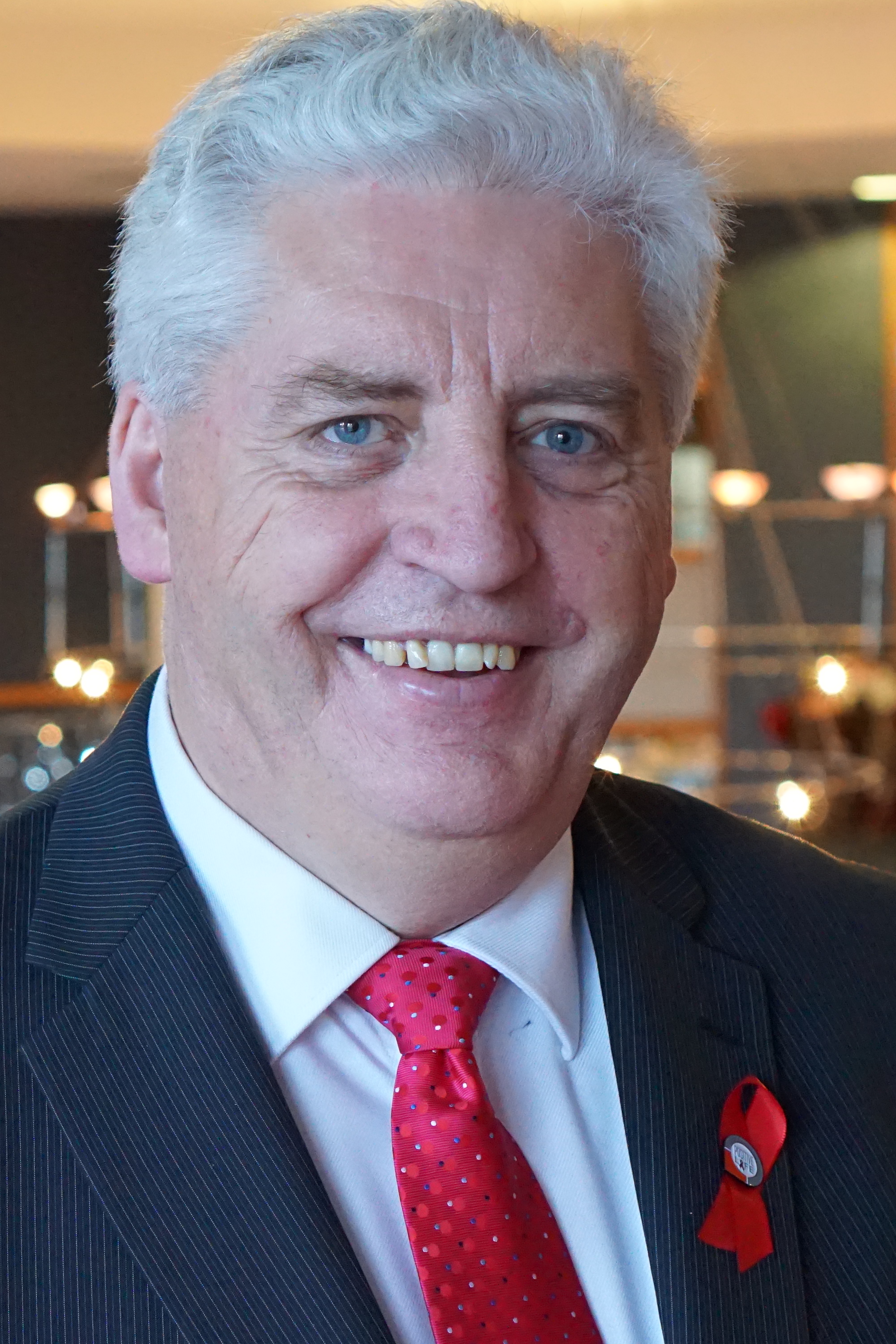

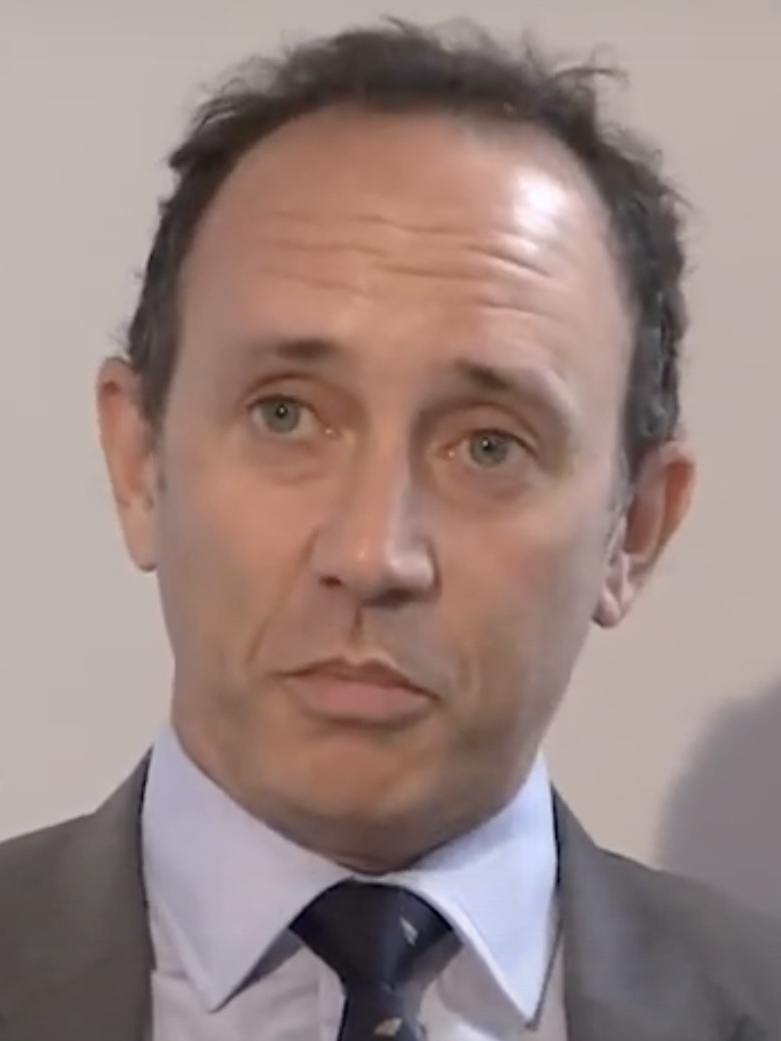

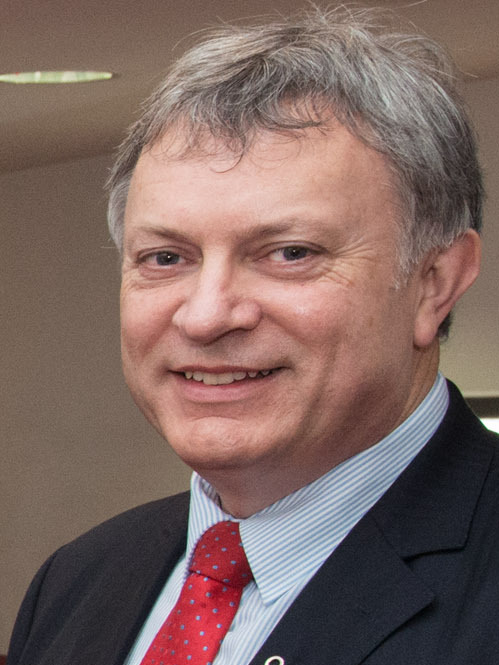

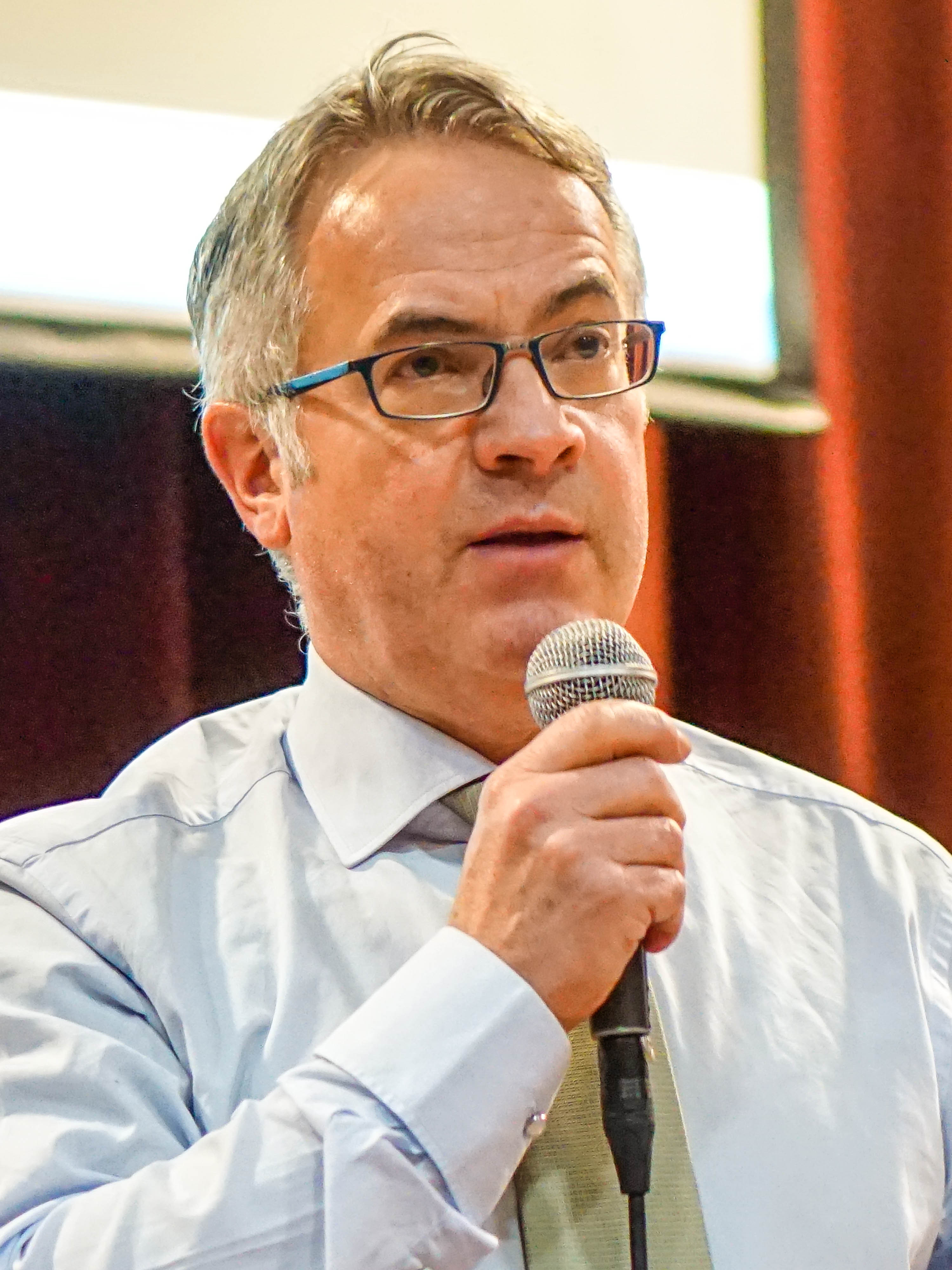
Candidate	Alasdair McDonnell	Conall McDevitt
1st pref.	127	105
Percentage	36.5%	30.2%
2nd round	140	131
Percentage	40.3%	37.8%
3rd round	188	152
Percentage	55.3%	44.7%
Candidate	Patsy McGlone	Alex Attwood
1st pref.	70	46
Percentage	20.1%	13.2%
2nd round	76	Eliminated
Percentage	21.9%	Eliminated
3rd round	Eliminated	Eliminated
Percentage	Eliminated	Eliminated
Leader before election
Margaret Ritchie
Elected Leader
Alasdair McDonnell

An election for the leadership of the Social Democratic and Labour Party (SDLP) was held 4–5 November 2011. Alasdair McDonnell won the leadership election and was announced the new leader of the SDLP on 5 November 2011.

== Background ==
Following poor election results in the 2010 UK general election as well as the 2011 Northern Ireland Assembly election, it was reported that the then-SDLP leader, Margaret Ritchie, faced a leadership challenge from deputy leader Patsy McGlone. McGlone stated at the beginning of August, 2011, that he would challenge Ritchie for the party's leadership at the annual conference in November. Ritchie subsequently announced on 8 September 2011, that she would not run in the coming leadership race.

== Candidates ==
Four SDLP members announced they would stand in the leadership election. These were:

- Alex Attwood - The Northern Ireland Executive's Minister for Social Development and MLA for West Belfast. Attwood was also the only MLA to fully endorse Margaret Ritchie's leadership of the SDLP.
- Conall McDevitt - MLA for South Belfast. At 39 years old, McDevitt was the youngest of all four candidates in the election. He was supported by the former SDLP minister Bríd Rodgers.
- Alasdair McDonnell - Another MLA for South Belfast, McDonnell is also the MP for South Belfast in the House of Commons. In the previous SDLP leadership election in 2010 he lost to Margaret Ritchie by 35 votes.
- Patsy McGlone - Deputy Leader of the SDLP and MLA for Mid-Ulster. His supporters included the SDLP founding member Ivan Cooper as well as North Belfast MLA Alban Maginness.

== Results ==
Below is a table summarising the results of the leadership election. Alasdair McDonnell had the most votes in every round of voting.

2011 Social Democratic and Labour Party leadership election
Party	Candidate	FPv%	Count		
Party	Candidate	FPv%	1	2	3
SDLP	Alasdair McDonnell	36.5	127	140	✓ 188
SDLP	Conall McDevitt	30.2	105	131	152
SDLP	Patsy McGlone	20.1	70	76	
SDLP	Alex Attwood	13.2	46		
Electorate: Valid: 348 Spoilt: Quota: 175 Turnout:
