= 1973 Coleraine bombings =

1973 IRA attack in Northern Ireland

Coordinates: 55.133°N 6.665°W

- Stephen Scilley outside the remains of the Wine Market
- Location: Railway Road and Hanover Place, Coleraine, County Londonderry, Northern Ireland
- Date: 12 June 1973; 15.00 (BST); 15.05 (BST)
- Attack type: 2 car bombs
- Deaths: 6 civilians
- Injuries: 33
- Perpetrator: Provisional IRA South Derry Brigade

The 1973 Coleraine bombings took place on 12 June 1973 when the Provisional IRA detonated two car bombs in Coleraine, County Londonderry, Northern Ireland. The first bomb exploded at 3:00 pm on Railway Road, killing six people and injuring 33; several lost limbs. A second bomb that exploded five minutes later at Hanover Place added to the panic and confusion in the area. It did not cause any injuries. The IRA had sent a warning for the second bomb and said it had mistakenly given the wrong location for the first.

As the six victims had all been Protestant, the bombings brought about a violent backlash from loyalist paramilitaries, who swiftly retaliated by unleashing a series of sectarian killings of Catholics that culminated in the double killing of Senator Paddy Wilson and Irene Andrews on 26 June.

Sinn Féin councillor Sean McGlinchey, brother of Dominic McGlinchey, later INLA Chief of Staff, was convicted of planting the bomb and spent 18 years in prison. He was elected mayor of Limavady Borough Council in 2011.

In his book Years of Darkness: The Troubles Remembered, academic Gordon Gillespie described the attacks as "a forgotten massacre" of the Troubles.

== The bombings ==
On 12 June 1973, two cars stolen from south County Londonderry were packed with explosives and driven by an Active Service Unit (ASU) of the South Derry Provisional IRA to the mainly-Protestant town of Coleraine. The car bombs were parked on Railway Road and Hanover Place. Two warnings made to the Telephone Exchange at 2.30 p.m. named the location for the Hanover Place device and for another bomb on Society Street, which later "proved to be a hoax". At about 3.00 p.m. a Ford Cortina containing a 100–150 pound (45–68 kg) bomb exploded outside a wine shop on Railway Road, killing six pensioners (four women and two men) and injuring 33 people, a number of them schoolchildren. The six pensioners—Elizabeth Craigmile (76), Robert Scott (72), Dinah Campbell (72), Francis Campbell (70), Nan Davis (60), and Elizabeth Palmer (60)—were all Protestant. Elizabeth Craigmile, the Campbells and their daughter Hilary had been on a day outing and were returning home to Belfast when the bomb had gone off; they were beside the carbomb at the moment of detonation. Some of the dead had been blown apart and Hilary Campbell was seriously injured Several of the wounded were maimed and left crippled for life. The bomb left a deep crater in the road and the wine shop was engulfed in flames; it also caused considerable damage to vehicles and other buildings in the vicinity. Railway Road was a scene of carnage and devastation with the mangled wreckage of the Ford Cortina resting in the middle of the street, the bodies of the dead and injured lying in pools of blood amongst the fallen masonry and roof slates, and shards of glass from blown-out windows blanketing the ground. Rescue workers who arrived at the scene spoke of "utter confusion" with many people "wandering around in a state of severe shock". Five minutes later, the second bomb went off in the forecourt of Stuart's Garage in Hanover Place. Although this explosion caused no injuries, it added to the panic and confusion yielded by the first bomb.

David Gilmour, a former councillor who works as a researcher for Unionist politician George Robinson, was caught up in the bombing. Gilmour, aged ten at the time, escaped injury along with his mother. Both had been sitting a car parked directly across from the Ford Cortina containing the bomb. At the precise moment the bomb detonated another car had passed between the two cars, shielding Gilmour and his mother from the full force of the blast, although their car was badly damaged. He recalled that when the bomb exploded everything had gone black, "deeper and darker than black - the blackness only punctuated by pinpricks of orange". He later learnt that these orange pinpricks were most likely metal fragments from the exploded car or embers from the fertiliser that had been used to make the bomb. In the immediate aftermath of the blast, there had been several seconds of "deathly silence" before "all hell broke loose", with hysterical people rushing from the scene and others going to tend the wounded who were screaming in agony.

Bob Scilley owner of Coleraine Wine Market and his son Stephen were not in their shop when the Bomb exploded but were a short distance away. Miraculously they both escaped injury. Elizabeth Palmer who worked for the family was inside the shop and suffered fatal injuries.

The Provisional IRA claimed responsibility for the bombings but said they had mistakenly given the wrong location for the carbomb on Railway Road when they sent their telephoned warning to the security forces. Gordon Gillespie alleged that no warning was given for the first bomb, adding "this led to speculation that the bombers intention was to draw people towards the bomb in Railway Road and inflict as many casualties as possible". Gillespie also suggested that the death toll would have likely been much higher had the bomb gone off 15 minutes later when girls from a nearby high school would have been leaving the school and walking along the street. The IRA member who planted the bomb, Sean McGlinchey, said that he had been forced to abandon the car on Railway Road. He explained that he arrived in Coleraine to find that the town had a new one-way traffic system, of which his superiors had not informed him. The bomb was primed, on a short fuse and he was "in the wrong place at the wrong time in the one-way system".

== Loyalist reaction ==
As all the victims had been Protestant, there was a violent backlash from loyalist paramilitaries. In May or June 1973, Ulster Defence Association (UDA) leaders decided that the organization should use the covername "Ulster Freedom Fighters" (UFF) when it wished to claim responsibility for its attacks. This was spurred by fears that the government would outlaw the UDA. The "UFF's" first attacks were in response to the Coleraine bombings. It sought retaliation against the Catholic community, which they believed supported the IRA. Four days after the bombing, the new leadership convened in Belfast and ordered its units to avenge the six Protestant pensioners by killing a Catholic. Jim Light was one of the UDA/UFF members who was instructed to execute the killing. He later told British journalist Peter Taylor that he had felt sick upon hearing about the pensioners killed in the Coleraine bombing: "They'd probably spent all their lives doing their day's work and were on an outing enjoying themselves. They were coming home and were blown to bits". Light and other UDA/UFF members went to Irish nationalist Andersonstown in west Belfast where they could be certain of finding a Catholic victim. They chose 17-year-old Daniel Rouse, who was kidnapped from the street where he had been walking and driven away to a field. Rouse was then shot through the head at point-blank range by Light. He had no IRA or Irish republican connections.

The next day, the body of 25-year-old Catholic man Joseph Kelly was found at Corr's Corner, near the Belfast-Larne Road. He had been shot. The UFF claimed the killing in a telephone call to a Belfast newspaper office using the words: "We have assassinated an IRA man on the way to Larne. We gave him two in the head and one in the back. He is dead". They did not directly refer to the Coleraine bombings, but rather claimed it was in retaliation for the killing of Michael Wilson, brother-in-law of UDA leader Tommy Herron. The UDA/UFF held the IRA responsible for Wilson's killing.

On 18 June the UFF claimed responsibility for throwing a bomb from a car at the "Meeting of the Waters", a nationalist pub on Manor Street, North Belfast. One man was seriously injured in the attack. The UFF said it attacked the pub because it was a "known haunt of Catholics and republicans".

On 26 June, the UFF perpetrated a double killing that shocked Northern Ireland with its savagery. Catholic Senator Paddy Wilson and his Protestant friend Irene Andrews were repeatedly stabbed to death in a frenzied attack. Their mutilated bodies were found by the security forces at a quarry off the Hightown Road near Cavehill following a telephone call by the UFF using its codename "Captain Black". UFF founder and leader John White was later convicted of the murders.

== Convictions ==
On 6 July 1973, a 22-year-old woman and 19-year-old man, both charged with the murder of the six pensioners, were assaulted and abused by an angry crowd of 150 people outside Coleraine courthouse. Eggs were hurled at them as they left the building following their second court appearance.

In January 1974, the woman was acquitted of the charges against her. However, her boyfriend received an eight-year prison sentence for his part in the attacks and the leader of the bomb team, 18-year-old Sean McGlinchey, was convicted of planting the Railway Road bomb. He was sentenced to 18 years imprisonment inside the Maze Prison for the six murders. McGlinchey is the younger brother of former INLA Chief of Staff Dominic McGlinchey. Upon his release from the Maze he became a Sinn Féin councillor and in 2011 was elected mayor of Limavady. He has repeatedly said that he deeply regretted the bombing in Coleraine, stating

What happened is my responsibility, those were my actions. If I had known innocent people would be killed I would never have done it. I regret the deaths and I have apologised.

Shortly after becoming mayor he met Jean Jefferson, whose aunt was killed and her father horribly disfigured in the bombing. She said of McGlinchey: "I was very impressed with somebody, who at 18 had made the wrong choice, the wrong decision, maybe to some extent been used and abused, and who is now spending his life putting back into the community more than what he ever got out of it".

In his book Years of Darkness: The Troubles Remembered, academic and writer Gordon Gillespie described the Coleraine bombings as "a forgotten massacre" of the Troubles.

== See also ==
- Chronology of Provisional Irish Republican Army actions (1970–1979)
- List of terrorist incidents in 1973
