= 2011 Labour Party leadership election =

Labour Party leadership elections were held in the following countries in 2011:

- 2011 New Zealand Labour Party leadership election
- 2011 Scottish Labour Party leadership election

== See also ==
- 2011 Social Democratic and Labour Party leadership election
- 2010 Labour Party leadership election
- 2012 Labour Party leadership election
