= 2024 Social Democratic and Labour Party leadership election =

- 30 August – 5 October 2024
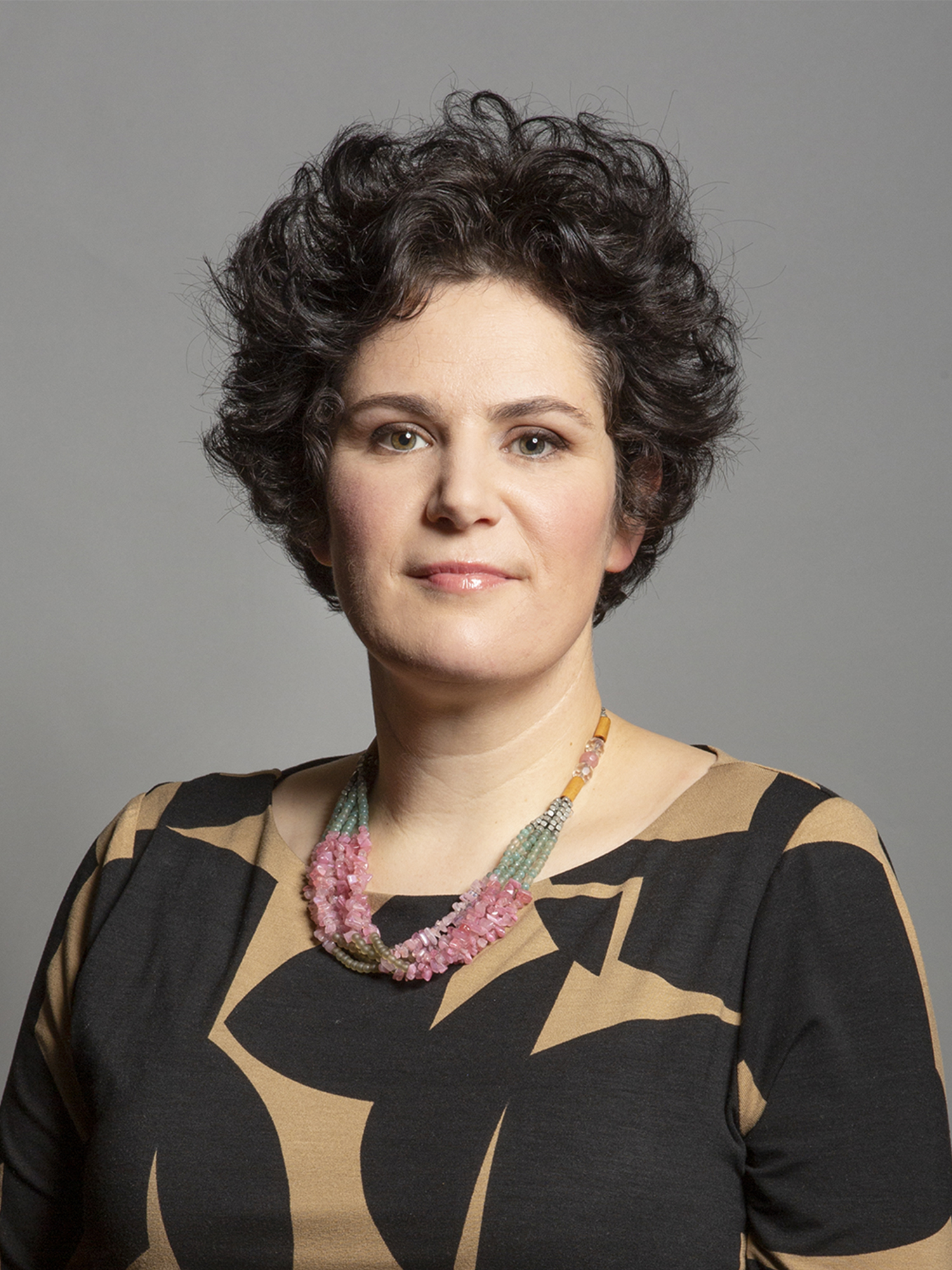
Candidate	Claire Hanna
Popular vote	Unopposed
Leader before election
Colum Eastwood
Elected Leader
Claire Hanna

A leadership election was held for the Social Democratic and Labour Party (SDLP) of Northern Ireland on 5 October 2024, following the resignation of Colum Eastwood on 29 August 2024 to focus on his role in the party's New Ireland Commission and as Member of Parliament (MP) for Foyle. The SDLP's other MP, Claire Hanna, ran unopposed for the leadership.

== Background ==
Eastwood was elected SDLP leader in 2015 after successfully challenging Dr Alasdair McDonnell to become the party's sixth leader in what was regarded as a "meteoric rise".

The party lost four seats in the 2022 Northern Ireland Assembly election, losing ground to Sinn Féin. They held their two seats at the 2024 United Kingdom general election, but their performance was seen as disappointing. Eastwood's own majority in Foyle was reduced from about 17,000 to just over 4,000.

The leadership election briefly overlapped with an Ulster Unionist Party leadership election and an Alliance Party deputy leadership election.

== Procedure ==
Eastwood formally resigned at the party's conference on 5 October 2024 to allow a new leader to be elected. Nominations for the leadership opened on 30 August with only Member of Parliament (MP) for Belfast South and Mid Down Claire Hanna and the party's eight Members of the Legislative Assembly (MLAs) eligible to put their names forward over the following seven days.

Key dates
Date	Event
29 August	SDLP Leader Colum Eastwood announces that he will resign at the SDLP Party conference.
30 August	Nominations opened.
6 September	Nominations closed at 12:00 BST with Clare Hanna being the only nominee.
5 October	Eastwood formally resigns at the party's conference. Hanna ratified as SDLP Leader.

== Candidates ==
=== Declared ===
Candidate	Born	Political office	Source
Claire Hanna	19 June 1980 Galway, Republic of Ireland	Deputy Leader of the Social Democratic and Labour Party (since 2022) MP for Belfast South and Mid Down (since 2019)	

=== Declined ===
Candidate	Born	Political office	Source
Matthew O'Toole	18 May 1983 Belfast, Northern Ireland	Leader of the Opposition (since 2022) MLA for Belfast South (since 2020)	

== Results ==
On 6 September 2024, Claire Hanna was announced as the only nominated candidate for leader. She was ratified in the post at the SDLP conference on 5 October 2025.
