= 2013 Labor Party leadership election =

Labour Party leadership elections were held in the following countries in 2013:

- March 2013 Australian Labor Party leadership spill
- June 2013 Australian Labor Party leadership spill
- October 2013 Australian Labor Party leadership spill
- 2013 Israeli Labor Party leadership election
- 2013 New Zealand Labour Party leadership election

== See also ==
- 2012 Labour Party leadership election
- 2014 Labour Party leadership election
