= Carmel Hanna =

Irish politician

Minister for Employment and Learning
- In office 14 December 2001 – 14 October 2002
- Preceded by: Sean Farren
- Succeeded by: Sir Reg Empey

Member of the Legislative Assembly for South Belfast
- In office 25 June 1998 – 18 January 2010
- Preceded by: Constituency established
- Succeeded by: Conall McDevitt

Personal details
- Born: Carmel McAleenan; 26 March 1946 (age 80) Warrenpoint, Northern Ireland
- Party: SDLP
- Spouse: Eamon Hanna
- Children: 4 (including Claire Hanna)
- Website: Official website

Carmel Hanna (née McAleenan; 26 April 1946, in Warrenpoint, County Down, Northern Ireland) is an Irish politician. She is a member of the SDLP and was MLA for South Belfast from 1998 to 2010.

== Early life and nursing career ==
Born as Carmel McAleenan, the seventh of nine children, her father was a factory worker in a local packaging plant. She was educated at Star of the Sea Primary School in Warrenpoint, and Our Lady's Grammar School, Newry.

She came to Belfast in 1964 to train as a nurse at Belfast City Hospital and qualified there as Registered Nurse in 1967 and later in 1970 at the Royal Maternity Hospital as a State Certified Midwife. She worked in hospitals in Northern Ireland, the Republic of Ireland, Great Britain and mainland Europe.

After living and working abroad (which gave her a long-term interest in third world development), she returned to Northern Ireland to work as a staff nurse in the Casualty department at the Mater Hospital, Crumlin Road, at the height of the Troubles. Her experiences there made an indelible impression and strengthened her belief that political change must be made by peaceful means. She was active in the Northern Ireland Civil Rights Campaign of the early 1970s.

She married Eamon Hanna in 1973. They have four adult children and they have lived and worked in Belfast, Dublin, Galway and the United States. In 1987 Carmel returned to work as a nurse and subsequently transferred to social services working for the South & East Belfast Trust assessing domiciliary care for the elderly. She also became an officer for her trade union, NIPSA.

== Political career ==
Carmel first joined the SDLP in 1972 and was an ordinary member for many years as well as being secretary and committee member of the Galway and Dublin SDLP support groups. She became chairperson of her local branch in 1996, in which year she was also an SDLP candidate in a Belfast City Council by election and Northern Ireland Forum elections.

She was elected to Belfast City Council for the Balmoral area in 1997. Her committee duties include Planning, Health & Environment and Cultural Diversity. She was elected to Northern Ireland Assembly in June 1998. Hanna was Deputy Chair of the Environment Committee in the Northern Ireland Assembly until December 2001. She was appointed as Minister of Employment and Learning in December 2001.

Her ministerial career ended in October 2002 when the Northern Ireland Assembly was suspended as a result of the 'Stormontgate' affair.

Carmel Hanna was founder and chair of the All-Party Group on International Development in the Assembly and, following her resignation from the Assembly in 2010, she worked with Voluntary Service Overseas in Namibia. Following the publication of the Murphy and Ryan Reports into institutional child abuse in state and church-run homes in the Irish Republic, Carmel Hanna tabled a motion in the Assembly on 2 December 2009 calling for a similar inquiry in Northern Ireland. The motion was passed unanimously and led to the setting up of the Hart Inquiry.

Her stated major political aims are:

- Preserving and enhancing South Belfast's townscape character
- Improving health, education and social services
- Retaining maternity services at the Jubilee hospital
- Working on social justice and cultural issues
- Working for social inclusion

First diagnosed with cancer in 2000, she resigned on 18 January 2010 as an MLA on grounds of ill-health. She received a Lifetime Achievement award in 2010 from the Royal College of Nursing Northern Ireland for her services to nursing; for many years she was the only serving registered nurse in the Assembly. Conall McDevitt was sworn in to replace her on 21 January 2010. Regarding her resignation, SDLP leader Mark Durkan said: "Carmel Hanna has served her constituents of South Belfast, the people of Northern Ireland and the wider SDLP with dignity, determination and dedication during a distinguished political career as a councillor, assembly member and as a minister."

She is the mother of Claire Hanna, who was elected as an SDLP Belfast City councillor for Balmoral in 2011 and served as an SDLP MLA for Belfast South from 2015 to 2019, when she was elected to represent Belfast South in parliament in Westminster.

Northern Ireland Assembly
New assembly	MLA for South Belfast; 1998–2010	Succeeded by Conall McDevitt
Political offices
Preceded by Sean Farren	Minister for Employment and Learning; 2001–2002	Vacant Office suspended Title next held by Sir Reg Empey
