= 2010 Labour Party leadership election =

2010 Labour Party leadership election may refer to:

- 2010 Australian Labor Party leadership spill
- 2010 Labour Party leadership election (UK)

== See also ==
- 2010 Social Democratic and Labour Party leadership election
- 2009 Labour Party leadership election
- 2011 Labour Party leadership election
