= Conall McDevitt =

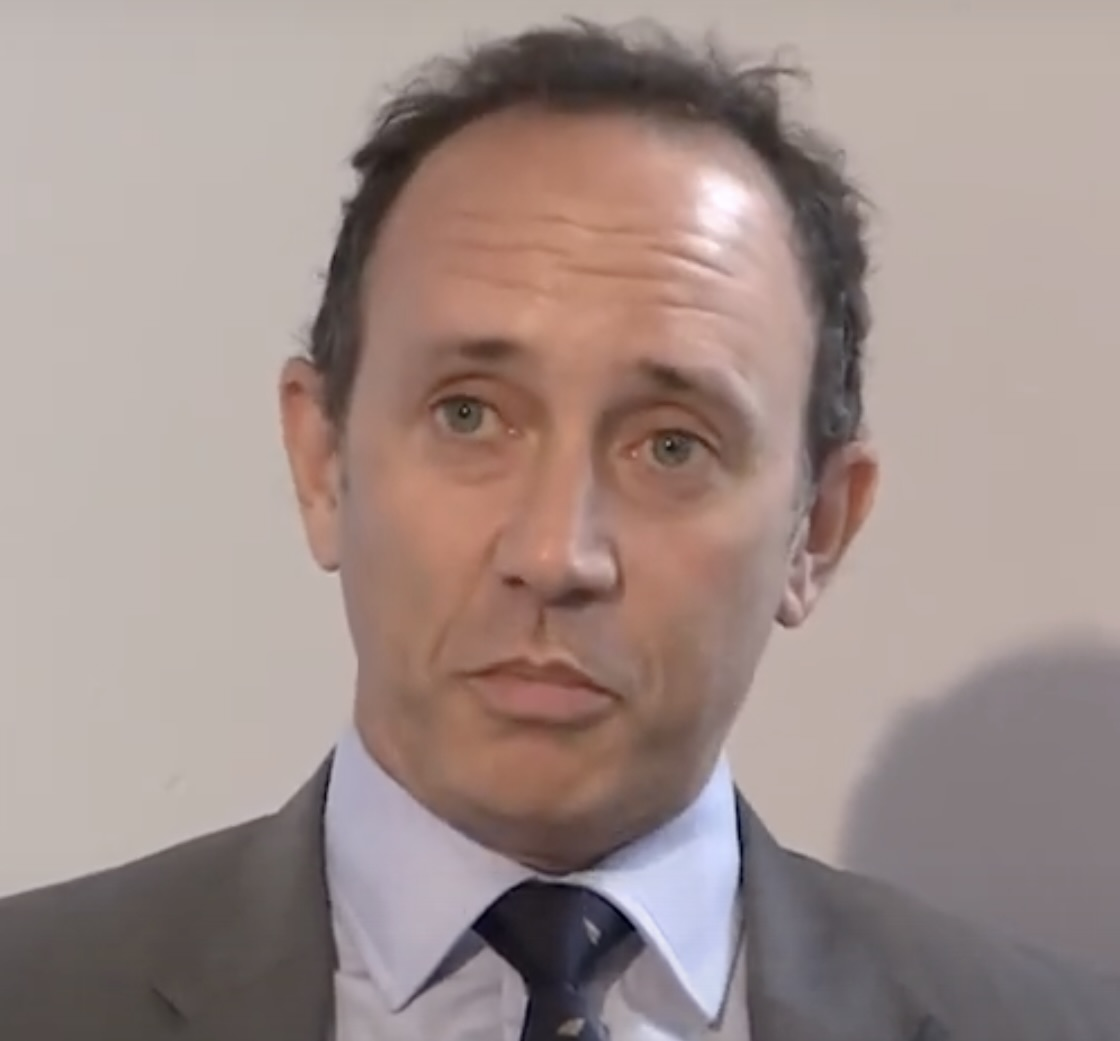
- McDevitt in 2017

Member of the Legislative Assembly for South Belfast
- In office 21 May 2010 – 4 September 2013
- Preceded by: Carmel Hanna
- Succeeded by: Fearghal McKinney

Personal details
- Born: 1 June 1972 (age 53) Dublin, Republic of Ireland
- Party: SDLP (until 2013)
- Website: Official website

Conall McDevitt (born 1972 in Dublin) is an Irish nationalist, and former member of the SDLP. He also served as the Social Democratic and Labour Party (SDLP) spokesman on Health, Social Services and Public safety and Policing, and was appointed to the Policing Board in May 2011.

== Background ==
McDevitt became the National Secretary of Labour Youth (Ireland) in 1993 and Vice President of ECOSY (European Community Organisation of Socialist Youth) in 1994. He became the SDLP Director of Communications in November 1996 until December 1999, a time that included the negotiations leading to the Good Friday Agreement and first Assembly elections. He left the SDLP to work as customer relations manager of Viridian Group PLC, then owners of Northern Ireland Electricity.

Following the establishment of the power-sharing Northern Ireland Executive, McDevitt served as Special Adviser to the Minister for Agriculture and Rural Development, Bríd Rodgers. He was involved in the attempts to resolve the Drumcree conflict and advised Rodgers during the 2001 United Kingdom foot-and-mouth outbreak.

He was selected as the SDLP MLA for South Belfast on 9 December 2009 and succeeded Carmel Hanna in the Northern Ireland Assembly in early 2010.

On 17 May 2012, McDevitt launched a consultation seeking views on a reduction in speed limits from 30 mph to 20 mph on designated unclassified roads.

McDevitt said the SDLP was "100%" behind moves to permit same-sex marriage, but caused controversy by saying two veteran councillors would be disciplined over their opposition to it.

In September 2013 he resigned from the Assembly after the revelation of three undeclared payments, amounting to £50,750 made up of £30,000 to JM Consulting for research support for his work as a member of the Northern Ireland Policing Board, £14,000 to JM Consulting for research and secretarial services for his work as an MLA and £6,750 from his previous employer Weber Shandwick while sitting as an MLA. JM Consulting was owned at that time by McDevitt's wife Joanne Murphy.

Three months after his resignation he joined the Irish lobbying firm Hume Brophy.

== Personal life ==
Born in Dublin, Ireland, but brought up in Málaga, Andalusia, Spain, McDevitt was educated at the Instituto Bachillerato Mixto, Fuengirola.

Northern Ireland Assembly
Preceded by Carmel Hanna	MLA for South Belfast; 2010–2013	Succeeded by Fearghal McKinney
