= Claire Hanna =

Leader of the Social Democratic and Labour Party since 2024

Claire Hanna MP
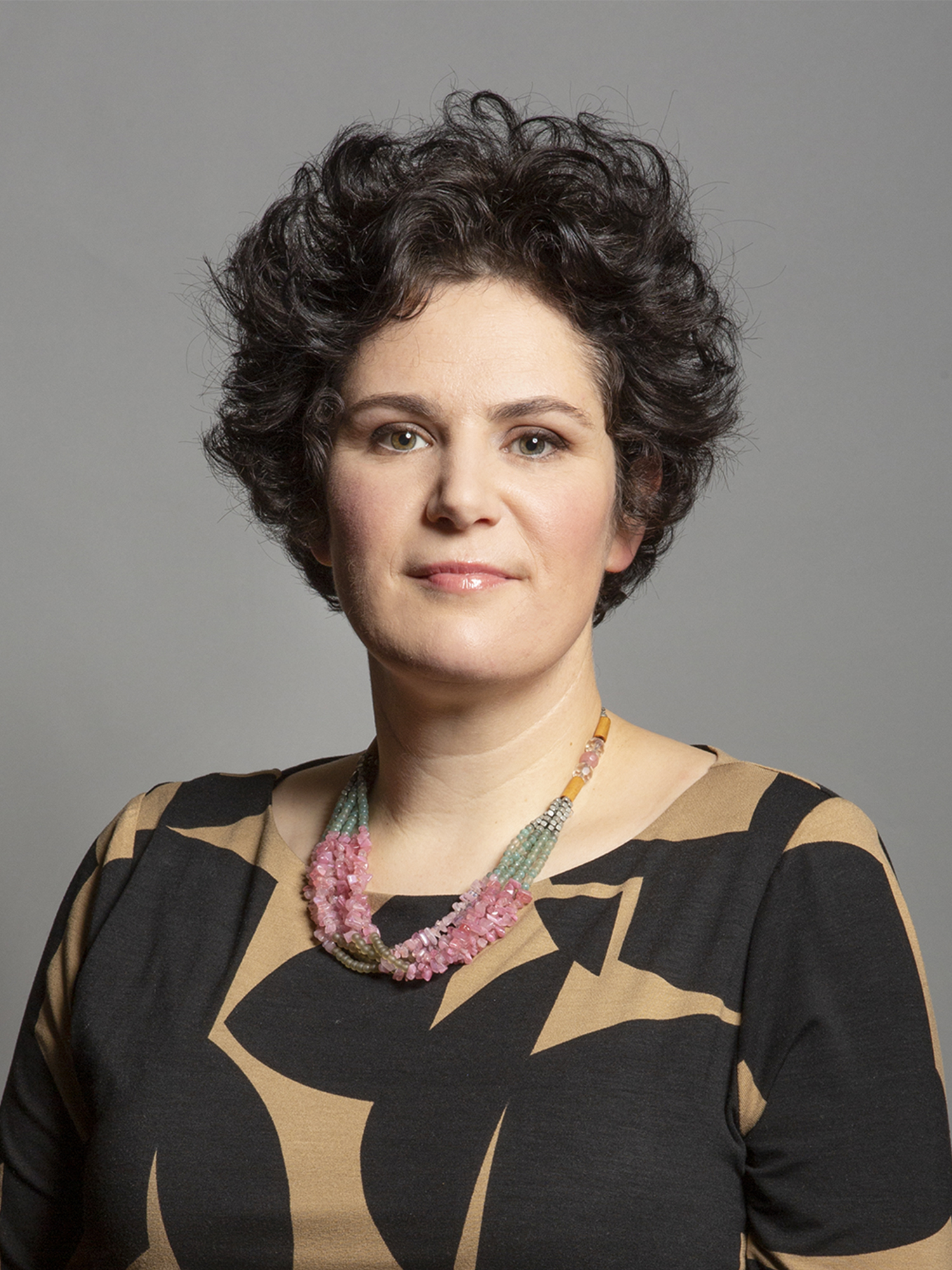
- Official portrait, 2019

Leader of the Social Democratic and Labour Party
- Incumbent
- Assumed office 5 October 2024
- Preceded by: Colum Eastwood

Member of Parliament for Belfast South and Mid Down Belfast South (2019–2024)
- Incumbent
- Assumed office 12 December 2019
- Preceded by: Emma Little-Pengelly
- Majority: 12,506 (28.8%)

Member of the Legislative Assembly for Belfast South
- In office 29 June 2015 – 12 December 2019
- Preceded by: Alasdair McDonnell
- Succeeded by: Matthew O'Toole

Member of Belfast City Council
- In office 5 May 2011 – 29 June 2015
- Preceded by: Carmel Hanna
- Succeeded by: Donal Lyons
- Constituency: Balmoral

Personal details
- Born: Claire Aisling Hanna; 19 June 1980 (age 46) Galway, Ireland
- Party: SDLP (2008–February 2019; November 2019–present)
- Other political affiliations: Independent (February–November 2019)
- Spouse: Donal Lyons (m. 2011)
- Children: 3 daughters
- Parent: Carmel Hanna (mother)
- Education: Rathmore Grammar School; Open University (BSc); Queen's University Belfast (LLM)
- Website: Official website

Claire Aisling Hanna (born 19 June 1980) is an Irish politician who has served as Leader of the Social Democratic and Labour Party (SDLP) in Northern Ireland since 5 October 2024 following her successful, unopposed candidacy in its 2024 leadership election. She has served as the Member of Parliament (MP) for Belfast South and Mid Down (formerly Belfast South) since 2019. Hanna previously served as a Member of the Legislative Assembly (MLA) for Belfast South from 2015 until her election to the Westminster parliament in 2019.

== Early life and education ==
Claire Aisling Hanna was born on 19 June 1980 in Galway, Ireland, to parents Carmel Hanna and Eamon Hanna, with two sisters and a brother. Eamon Hanna is a former general secretary of the SDLP.

Hanna has lived in south Belfast since the age of three. She attended St Bride's Primary and Rathmore Grammar School, both in Belfast. Hanna holds a Bachelor of Science (BSc) honours degree in International Relations from the Open University and a master's degree in law (LLM) from Queen's University Belfast. In the 1998 Assembly election, her mother Carmel became a member of the Northern Ireland Assembly for the SDLP, representing Belfast South until 2010.

Hanna's professional background is in international development, latterly in a policy and education role, and included work in Bangladesh, Haiti and Zambia. She was a campaigns officer for Concern Worldwide from 2005 to 2015.

== Political career ==
=== Belfast City Council ===
Hanna was elected to Belfast City Council in 2011, representing the Balmoral ward, winning re-election in 2014. She remained in this role until becoming an MLA in June 2015.

She successfully brought forward a motion to make Belfast City Council the first Living Wage local authority on the island, as well as securing all-party support for her proposal to award the Freedom of Belfast to poet Michael Longley. She initiated a campaign to name the new Greenway bridge after playwright and trade unionist Sam Thompson.

She was replaced by her husband Donal Lyons on Belfast City Council.

=== Northern Ireland Assembly ===
Hanna was elected to the Northern Ireland Assembly in June 2015, representing Belfast South, the same constituency in which her mother had previously been elected. She served as vice chair of the Finance Committee, as well as on the Public Accounts Committee and the Environment Committees and chaired the Assembly All Party Groups on International Development and the Arts. Hanna's private member's bill on breastfeeding fell when the Assembly collapsed in early 2017.

Hanna was the first member of the SDLP to express concern about the decision of SDLP Newry councillors to vote to name a play park after IRA hunger striker Raymond McCreesh. During the same period, Hanna was chair of the East Belfast Policing Board and Community Partnership. Her home was attacked in the midst of flag protests in the area.

In February 2019, Hanna resigned the SDLP party whip in protest after the party agreed to form an electoral alliance with Fianna Fáil, stating that she would "never become a Fianna Fáil MLA". Hanna had herself been more closely associated with the Irish Labour Party and Fine Gael, and had canvassed in support of them in the past.

=== House of Commons ===
Hanna was elected as the Member of Parliament for Belfast South at the 2019 general election, defeating DUP MP Emma Little-Pengelly. She caused controversy when she affirmed allegiance to the Queen, and then lodged a "respectful protest" against her pledge the following day.

Hanna was re-elected to the successor constituency of Belfast South and Mid Down at the 2024 general election with a decreased majority. Following the election of the Labour government, Hanna and Eastwood decided to sit on the government benches in the House of Commons.

In December 2024, Hanna paid tribute to the former President of the United States Jimmy Carter following his death stating that he was the "First U.S. President to seriously engage with NI issues."

=== Leader of the SDLP ===
Hanna was elected the seventh leader of the SDLP, taking over from Colum Eastwood in 2024 following an uncontested leadership election.

In March 2025, Hanna spoke Irish for the first time during Prime Minister's Questions to mark Saint Patrick's Day and Seachtain na Gaeilge.

At the SDLP's annual conference in October 2025, Hanna called on the Irish government to establish a Ministry for a New Ireland in order to prepare for a united Ireland. This was described by some commentators as an attempt to "reassert the SDLP's nationalist credentials" in an attempt to gain electoral support.

== Personal life ==
She married Belfast SDLP councillor Donal Lyons in 2011; the couple have three daughters. Hanna lists her recreations as "theatre, reading, running, listening to music, art". She has spoken of the importance of the arts as "facilitating human connection and our understanding of ourselves" and how, in Northern Ireland, the arts and arts venues are important shared spaces.

Parliament of the United Kingdom
Preceded by Emma Little-Pengelly	Member of Parliament for Belfast South; 2019–2024	Constituency abolished
New constituency	Member of Parliament for Belfast South and Mid Down; 2024–present	Incumbent
Northern Ireland Assembly
Preceded by Alasdair McDonnell	Member of the Legislative Assembly for Belfast South; 2015–2020	Succeeded by Matthew O'Toole
Party political offices
Preceded by Colum Eastwood	Leader of the SDLP; 2024 to present	Incumbent
