= Pitchfork murders =

1972 killings in Northern Ireland

- Part of the Troubles
- Location: Aughnahinch, County Fermanagh, Northern Ireland
- Date: 23 October 1972; 4:20 p.m.
- Attack type: Stabbing
- Weapon: Bowie knife
- Victims: Michael Naan and Andrew Murray
- Perpetrators: Stanley Hathaway; John Byrne; Iain Chestnut

The killings of Michael Naan and Andrew Murray, better known as the Pitchfork murders, was the stabbing of two Catholic civilians, Michael Naan (born c. 1941) and Andrew Joseph Murray (born 22 February 1948) in October 1972, by two British Army soldiers of the Argyll and Sutherland Highlanders.

Initial reports claimed Naan and Murray were killed with a pitchfork which is where the incidents name comes from.

== Stabbing ==
On 23 October 1972 at around 4:20 p.m., two soldiers of the Argyll and Sutherland Highlanders, Sgt. Stanley Hathaway and Cpl. John Byrne, attacked farmer and civil rights activist Michael Naan (31) and laborer Andrew Joseph Murray (24) with a Bowie knife, while they were lifting hay off a trailer at Naan’s farm in Aughnahinch, County Fermanagh.

Murray was stabbed 13 times in the chest and Naan was stabbed at least 17 times and his throat slashed.

Hathaway and Byrne claimed they attacked Naan and Murray because they believed they were members of the Provisional Irish Republican Army. Although it is possible they targeted Naan because he was a prominent member of the Northern Ireland Civil Rights Association; the killings could have also been in reprisal for the murder of Pvt. John Robert “Robin” Bell (21), a member of the Ulster Defence Regiment who was ambushed by the IRA a day earlier at his family’s farm in nearby Derrydoon.

In 1979, Hathaway and Byrne were both charged with murder. Also charged was Corporal Iain Chestnut and the commander of the men's platoon, Lieutenant Andrew Snowball. In 1981, Hathaway and Byrne pleaded guilty and were sentenced to life in prison. Chestnut was convicted of manslaughter and sentenced to four years in prison. Snowball, who was not present for the murders, pleaded guilty to withholding information about the incident and received a one-year suspended sentence.

== See also ==
- Paddy Wilson and Irene Andrews killings, similar 1973 murder committed by the UFF
