= Murder of Paddy Wilson and Irene Andrews =

1973 double-murder in Belfast during the Troubles

- Part of the Troubles
- Victims Irene Andrews and Senator Paddy Wilson
- Location: Quarry off the Hightown Road, Belfast, Northern Ireland
- Date: 25/26 June 1973
- Attack type: Stabbing
- Deaths: 2 (Paddy Wilson and Irene Andrews)
- Perpetrator: John White (loyalist) part of the Ulster Freedom Fighters (UFF)

The murder of Paddy Wilson and Irene Andrews took place in Belfast, Northern Ireland, on the night of 25/26 June 1973. The victims, Roman Catholic Senator Paddy Wilson and his Protestant friend Irene Andrews, were hacked and repeatedly stabbed to death by members of the Ulster Freedom Fighters (UFF). This was a cover name for the Ulster Defence Association (UDA), a then-legal Ulster loyalist paramilitary organisation. John White, a senior UFF leader who used the pseudonym "Captain Black", was convicted of the sectarian double murder in 1978 and sentenced to life imprisonment. White, however maintained that Davy Payne helped him lead the assassination squad and played a major part in the attack. Although questioned by the Royal Ulster Constabulary (RUC) after the killings, Payne admitted nothing and was never charged.

Wilson was one of the founders and General Secretary of the Social Democratic and Labour Party (SDLP) and Irene Andrews was noted in Belfast as a popular ballroom dancer. Their mutilated bodies were found lying in pools of blood on either side of Wilson's car, which was parked in a quarry off the Hightown Road near Cavehill. Wilson had been hacked and stabbed 30 times and his throat cut from ear to ear. Andrews had received 20 knife wounds. The killings were described by the judge at White's trial as "a frenzied attack, a psychotic outburst".

== Murders ==
On the evening of 25 June 1973, Stormont Senator Paddy Wilson (39) had been drinking at the Old Vic lounge inside McGlade's Bar, a fashionable pub located in Donegall Street, Belfast city centre. He was in the company of a Protestant friend, Irene Andrews (29), who worked as a clerk in the Department of Education and was one of Belfast's most popular ballroom dancers who had been a member of Northern Ireland's "Come Dancing" team. According to Peter McKenna, a journalist for the Irish Independent who had been socialising with Wilson, Andrews and others on the night, an inebriated Andrews had spent much of the night making passes at Wilson but he had rejected her advances and had asked for McKenna to make an "urgent" phone call to the pub calling him away in an attempt to separate himself from Andrews. The ruse was not successful, however, and Wilson and Andrews left the pub together.

He offered her a lift back to her home on the Crumlin Road and they drove away from the pub at about 11:30pm in Wilson's red mini. The couple never arrived at their destination. At 1:30am, the loyalist Ulster Freedom Fighters (UFF), using the codename "Captain Black", called the Belfast News Letter: "Tonight we have got Senator Paddy Wilson and a lady friend. Their bodies are lying in the Hightown Road". The UFF was a cover name to claim attacks carried out by the then-legal Ulster Defence Association to avoid the latter's proscription by the British Government. "Captain Black" furthermore claimed that the killings were in retaliation for the shooting death of a mentally-disabled Protestant teenager the previous summer by the Provisional IRA.

The mutilated bodies of Wilson and Andrews were discovered by the security forces at 4am. They were lying in pools of blood on either side of Wilson's Mini at a quarry off the Hightown Road near Cavehill as described by the UFF caller. The Royal Ulster Constabulary (RUC) and British Army proceeded carefully to the quarry in case the bodies had been booby-trapped. Wilson had been stabbed to death 30 times and his throat sliced from ear-to-ear. There was evidence that he had put up a struggle before he was killed. Andrews had received 20 knife wounds. A UFF Brigade Staff member described the killings to a journalist as ritualistic; in addition to the multiple stabbings, Andrews had her breasts hacked off. The killings took place at the quarry and it was suggested by police that Wilson's car had been stopped on the road leading to Ballysillan and they were forced at gunpoint to drive out to the quarry. According to Martin Dillon, forensic evidence indicated that Wilson had been dragged from the car and pinned to the ground where he was stabbed and Andrews was killed afterwards. Dillon speculated that the killers had made Andrews watch Wilson being killed.

There was widespread shock and condemnation in the wake of the killings. Politicians, including Taoiseach Liam Cosgrave and SDLP leader Gerry Fitt, offered their condolences to the Wilson and Andrews' families, whilst Democratic Unionist Party leader Ian Paisley blamed the IRA. According to Peter Taylor, there had never been a crime so brutal carried out in Northern Ireland before.

Author Dervla Murphy in her travel book, A Place Apart (based on her experiences in Northern Ireland), stated that nine months before the double killing, a loyalist community newspaper had published allegations regarding a possible relationship between a prominent member of the SDLP and a young Protestant woman from Belfast's Crumlin Road.

=== Conviction ===
During a police interrogation for other offences at the Castlereagh Holding Centre in 1976, UFF man and so-called "Captain Black" John White, confessed to the killings. He was convicted of the murders in 1978 and given two life sentences. The trial judge described the killings as "a frenzied attack, a psychotic outburst". White maintained that fellow UDA man Davy Payne, also known as the "Psychopath", was part of the assassination squad and played a leading role in the killings. Historian Ian S. Wood confirmed Payne's central involvement in the double killing. Although Payne had been questioned by the RUC after the killings, he admitted nothing and never faced any charges. It was alleged that whenever Payne wished to frighten or intimidate others he would shout: "Do you know who I am? I'm Davy Payne. They say I killed Paddy Wilson".

Following White's release from the Maze Prison in 1992, he joined the Ulster Democratic Party. A prominent figure in the Northern Ireland Peace Process, in 1996 he was part of a four-man loyalist delegation to 10 Downing Street where he met British Prime Minister John Major.

Later when asked why he had perpetrated the killings, White claimed that they were carried out to strike fear into the Catholic community after the IRA's 1973 Coleraine bombings. Regarding Irene Andrews, White replied: "We didn't know she was a Protestant, we just thought she was a Catholic to be honest".

== See also ==
- Shankill Butchers
- Pitchfork murders, similar 1972 murder committed by the British Army
