= Fearghal McKinney =

Irish politician and journalist

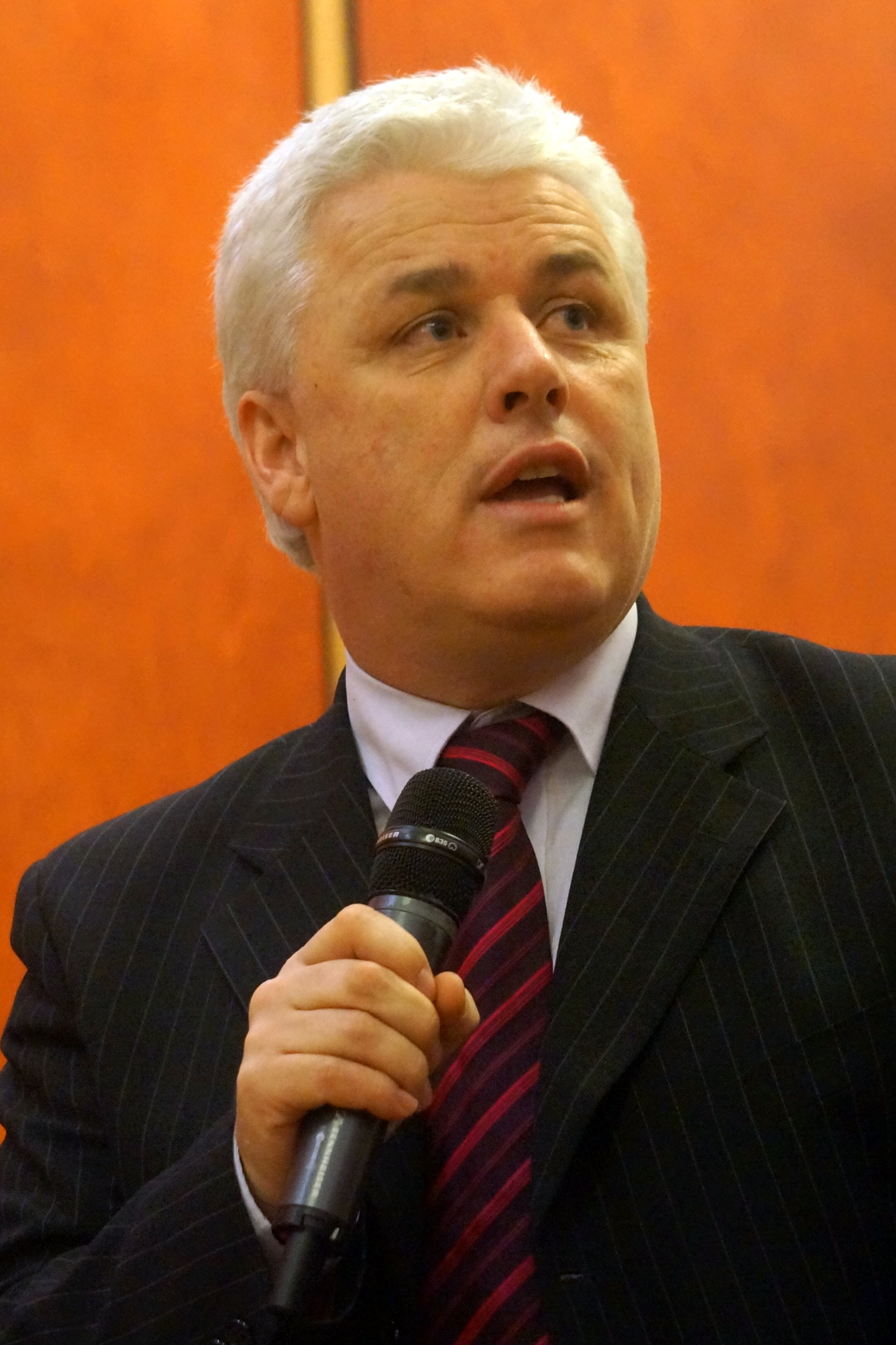

Deputy Leader of the Social Democratic and Labour Party
- In office 14 November 2015 – 2016
- Leader: Colum Eastwood
- Preceded by: Dolores Kelly
- Succeeded by: Nichola Mallon

Member of the Legislative Assembly for South Belfast
- In office 16 September 2013 – 5 May 2016
- Preceded by: Conall McDevitt
- Succeeded by: Clare Bailey

Personal details
- Born: 6 July 1962 (age 64) Derry, Northern Ireland
- Party: SDLP
- Spouse: Maire
- Children: 3
- Profession: Journalist

Fearghal McKinney (born 6 July 1962 in Derry, Northern Ireland) is an Irish politician and former journalist. A member of the Social Democratic and Labour Party (SDLP), he sat in the Northern Ireland Assembly as a Member of the Legislative Assembly (MLA) for South Belfast from 2013 until his defeat at the 2016 Assembly election. He was deputy leader of the SDLP from 2015 to 2016.

== Broadcasting career ==
McKinney was a reporter and presenter on UTV Live, joining the station in 1994. Before joining UTV, he was a journalist at The Impartial Reporter in his hometown of Enniskillen and at Downtown Radio. McKinney was educated at St Michael's College, Enniskillen.

In addition to his work for UTV Live, McKinney presented the series Sunday Issue and The Issue for UTV from 2003 to 2004. He has also reported on, introduced television debates about, and co-hosted UTV's coverage of local and general elections. McKinney was nominated in 2006 for the RTS Award for Nations and Regions Presenter.

In January 2009, McKinney announced his departure from UTV, and left the station that month.

== Political career ==
McKinney unsuccessfully contested the Parliamentary constituency of Fermanagh and South Tyrone in the 2010 Westminster general election for the Social Democratic and Labour Party. He was selected to replace Conall McDevitt as MLA for South Belfast and became an MLA on 16 September 2013.

McKinney was appointed SDLP Health Spokesperson sitting on the Committee for Health, Social Services and Public Safety. He was also a member of the Committee for Enterprise, Trade and Investment. On 14 November 2015, he was elected deputy leader of the SDLP.

After becoming an MLA, McKinney raised a number of health issues within the Northern Ireland Assembly including the introduction of amendments to ban smoking in cars with children. He also tabled a number of motions for debate on the Transforming Your Care plan, on older people's care, autism services, and mental health services.

On 25 June 2015, McKinney was selected as an SDLP candidate for South Belfast in the Northern Ireland Assembly election on 5 May 2016, but he was unsuccessful in defending the seat he inherited from Conall McDevitt.

== Personal life ==
McKinney is married with three children and lives in Belfast.

Northern Ireland Assembly
Preceded by Conall McDevitt	MLA for South Belfast; 2013–2016	Succeeded by Clare Bailey
