= 2010 Social Democratic and Labour Party leadership election =

- 5–7 February 2010
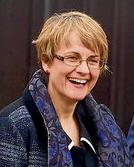

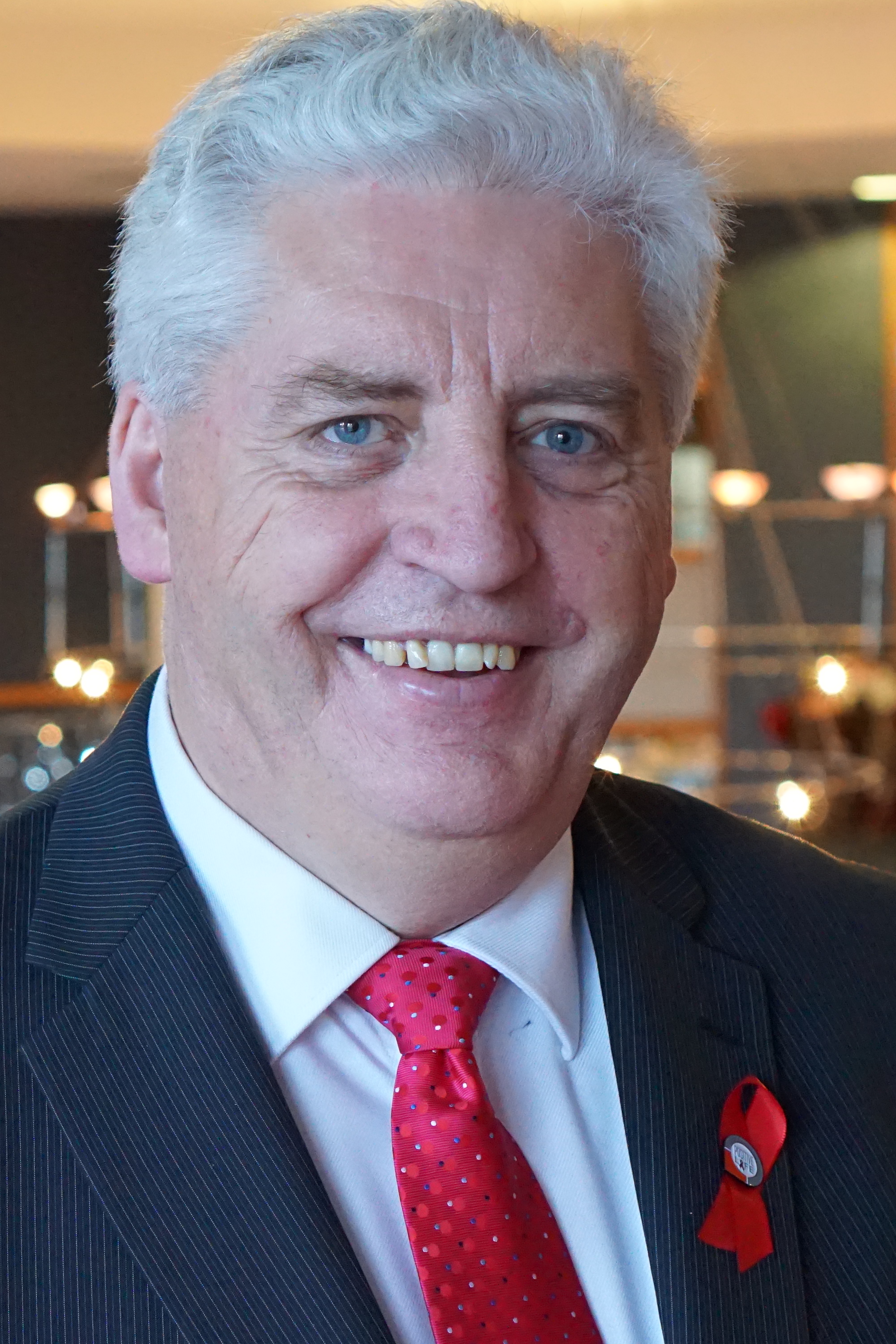
Candidate	Margaret Ritchie	Alasdair McDonnell
1st Pref.	222	187
Percentage	54.3%	45.7%
Leader before election
Mark Durkan
Elected Leader
Margaret Ritchie

An election for the leadership of the Social Democratic and Labour Party (SDLP) was held 5–7 February 2010. Margaret Ritchie defeated her only challenger, Alasdair McDonnell, by 222 votes to 187.

== Background ==
The former SDLP leader, Mark Durkan, announced his intention to stand down as leader of the SDLP in September 2009, citing that he did not want to continue to lead the party past his 50th birthday, and also to allow him to concentrate on his parliamentary career. Subsequently, a leadership election was scheduled for the SDLP annual conference in February 2010.

== Candidates ==
Two SDLP members contested the leadership election. These were:

- Alasdair McDonnell - MP for South Belfast as well as MLA for the corresponding constituency in the Northern Ireland Assembly. McDonnell was also the Deputy Leader of the SDLP prior to the leadership election.
- Margaret Ritchie - MLA for South Down and Minister for Social Development in the Northern Ireland Assembly.

== Results ==
Below is a table summarising the result of the leadership election:

2010 Social Democratic and Labour Party leadership election
Candidate	Votes	%
Margaret Ritchie	✓ 222	54.3
Alasdair McDonnell	187	45.7

Margaret Ritchie was duly named the new SDLP leader on 7 February 2010.
