= 2015 Social Democratic and Labour Party leadership election =

Party election in Northern Ireland

- 12–15 November 2015
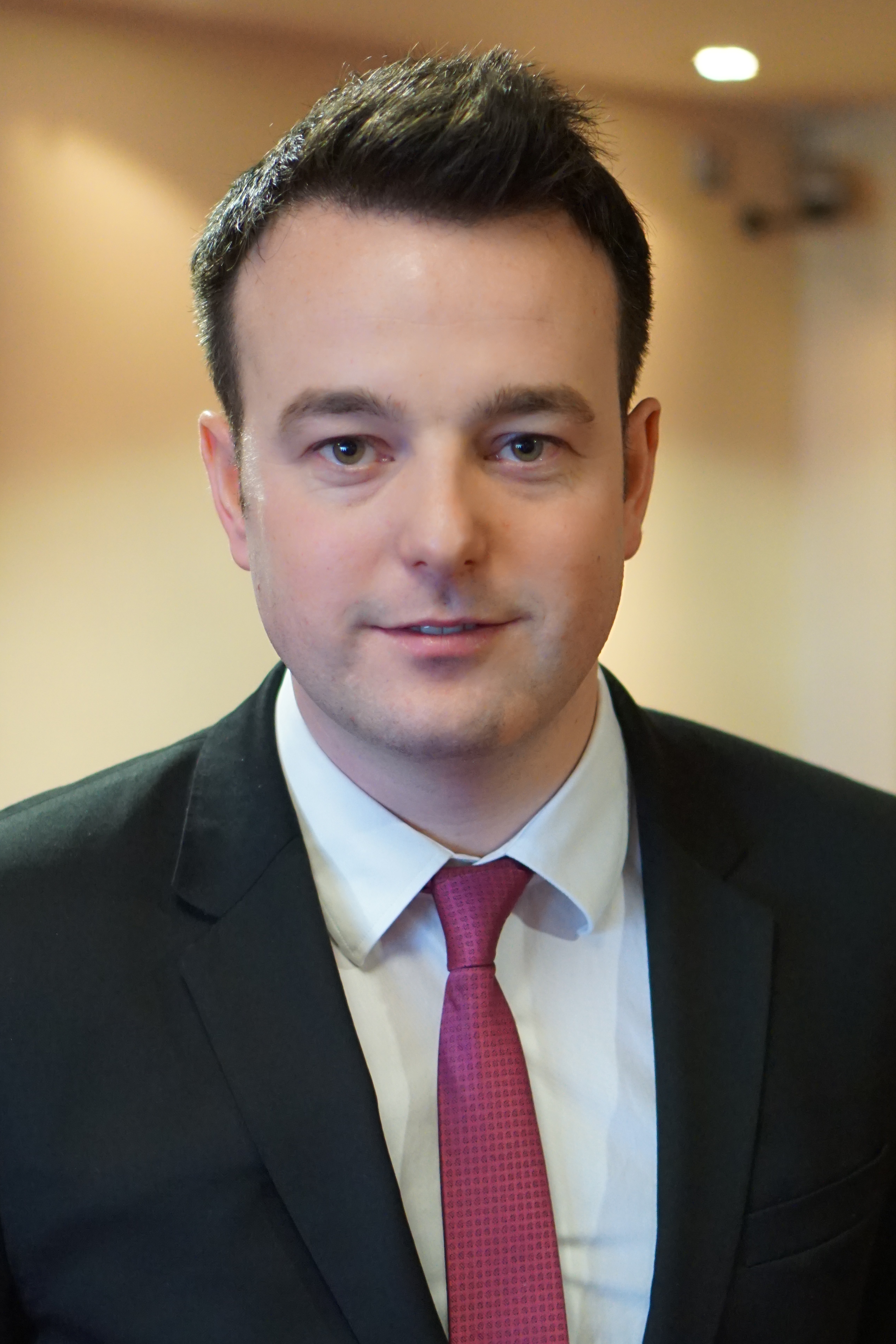

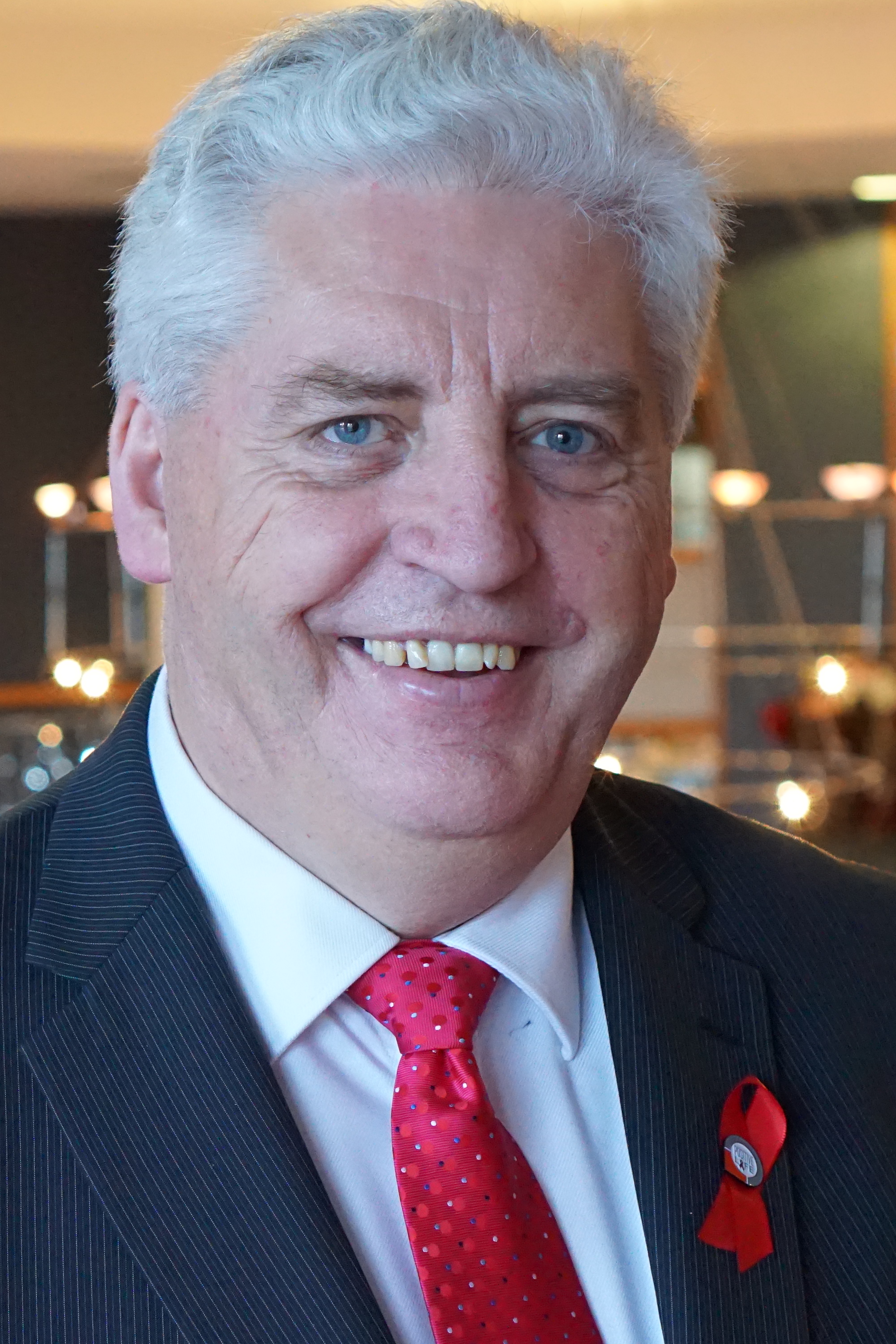
Candidate	Colum Eastwood	Alasdair McDonnell
1st pref.	172	133
Percentage	56.4%	43.6%
Leader before election
Alasdair McDonnell
Elected Leader
Colum Eastwood

A leadership election was held for the Social Democratic and Labour Party (SDLP) of Northern Ireland between 12 and 15 November 2015. The result was a victory for Colum Eastwood.

== Background ==
Following poor election results in the 2014 local elections, the 2014 European Parliament election and the 2015 Westminster election, McDonnell resisted calls to stand down. Initially no challenger came forward, though early in June it was rumoured that eventual challenger Colum Eastwood would stand. It was not until late September that Eastwood confirmed that he would stand against McDonnell.

== Candidates ==
Two SDLP members announced they would stand in the leadership election. These were:

- Colum Eastwood - MLA for Foyle. At 32 years old, Eastwood was the youngest SDLP MLA. He counted among his supporters the former Deputy First Minister of Northern Ireland Seamus Mallon and former leader Mark Durkan.
- Alasdair McDonnell - Leader of the SDLP and MP for Belfast South.

== Results ==
Below is a table summarising the results of the leadership election. With just two candidates there was only one round of votes.

2015 Social Democratic and Labour Party leadership election
Party	Candidate	FPv%	Count
Party	Candidate	FPv%	1
SDLP	Colum Eastwood	56.4	172
SDLP	Alasdair McDonnell	43.6	133
Electorate: 315 Valid: 305 Spoilt: Quota: 154 Turnout:
