= 2012 Labour Party leadership election =

Leadership elections took place in Labour Parties in the following countries during 2012:

- 2012 Australian Labor Party leadership spill
- 2012 Labour Party (Netherlands) leadership election

== See also ==
- 2011 Labour Party leadership election
- 2013 Labour Party leadership election
