= Belfast South and Mid Down =

UK Parliament constituency (since 2024)

- Borough constituency for the House of Commons
- Boundary of Belfast South and Mid Down in Northern Ireland
- District: Belfast; Lisburn and Castlereagh; Newry, Mourne and Down
- Borough: Belfast

Current constituency
- Created: 2024
- Member of Parliament: Claire Hanna (SDLP)
- Seats: 1
- Created from: Belfast South; Lagan Valley; Strangford

Belfast South and Mid Down is a parliamentary constituency in the United Kingdom House of Commons. It was created in 2024 as a successor to Belfast South. It contains central Belfast, Finaghy, Drumbo, and Carryduff.

The MP since 2024 is Claire Hanna of the Social Democratic and Labour Party (SDLP). Hanna had been MP for Belfast South since the 2019 general election.

== Boundaries ==
Map of boundaries from 2024

Following the 2023 review of Westminster constituencies, the seat of Belfast South was subject to boundary changes and renamed Belfast South and Mid Down. The redrawn constituency contained 90.8% of the population of the former Belfast South. It was first contested at the 2024 general election.

The constituency comprises:

In Belfast, the wards of Belvoir, Blackstaff, Central, Finaghy, Malone, Musgrave, Ormeau, Ravenhill, Rosetta, Stranmillis, Upper Malone, and Windsor;

in Lisburn and Castlereagh, the wards of Beechill, Cairnshill, Carryduff East, Carryduff West, Drumbo, Galwally, Knockbracken, Moneyreagh, and Newtownbreda; and

in Newry, Mourne and Down, the ward of Saintfield.

== Members of Parliament ==
Election	Member	Party
2024	Claire Hanna	SDLP

== Election results ==
=== Elections in the 2020s ===
2024 general election: Belfast South and Mid Down
Party	Candidate	Votes	%	±%
SDLP	Claire Hanna	21,345	49.1	▼4.2
Alliance	Kate Nicholl	8,839	20.3	▲4.9
DUP	Tracy Kelly	6,859	15.8	▼9.6
UUP	Michael Henderson	2,653	6.1	▲2.5
TUV	Dan Boucher	2,218	5.1	New
Green (NI)	Áine Groogan	1,577	3.6	▲3.4
Majority		12,506	28.8	▲0.9
Turnout		43,491	58.2	▼8.0
Registered electors		74,749		
SDLP win (new seat)				

=== Elections in the 2010s ===
2019 notional result
Party excl. candidate	Vote	%
Social Democratic and Labour Party	25,409	53.3
Democratic Unionist Party	12,087	25.4
Alliance	7,348	15.4
Ulster Unionist Party	1,703	3.6
Aontú	568	1.2
Sinn Féin	247	0.5
Conservatives	167	0.4
Greens	73	0.2
People Before Profit	67	0.1
Majority	13,322	27.9
Turnout	47,669	66.2
Electorate	71,978	
