= Paddy Wilson =

Northern Irish politician (1933–1973)

Patrick Gerard Wilson (c. 1933 – 1973) was an Irish nationalist politician in Northern Ireland who was murdered by the loyalist Ulster Freedom Fighters (UFF).

== Life ==
Patrick Gerard Wilson was born in Fleet Street in Sailortown, Belfast, the youngest of seven children in a Catholic nationalist family. He and his wife Bridget had one son, Paul. He was elected as a Republican Labour Party member of the Senate of Northern Ireland in 1969. The following year, he became a founder member of the Social Democratic and Labour Party, and its first General Secretary. He was also a Belfast City Councillor.

== Death ==
On 26 June 1973, Wilson (aged 39) and his companion, Irene Andrews (aged 29), a Protestant, were found dead. They had been stabbed to death. Wilson's throat was cut. He was interred in Belfast's Milltown Cemetery. Loyalist John White was later convicted for his part in the murders.

== See also ==
- Paddy Wilson and Irene Andrews killings

Party political offices
New political party	General Secretary of the Social Democratic and Labour Party; 1970–1972	Succeeded by John Duffy
