= Margaret Ritchie, Baroness Ritchie of Downpatrick =

Northern Irish politician (born 1958)

The Right Honourable The Baroness Ritchie of Downpatrick
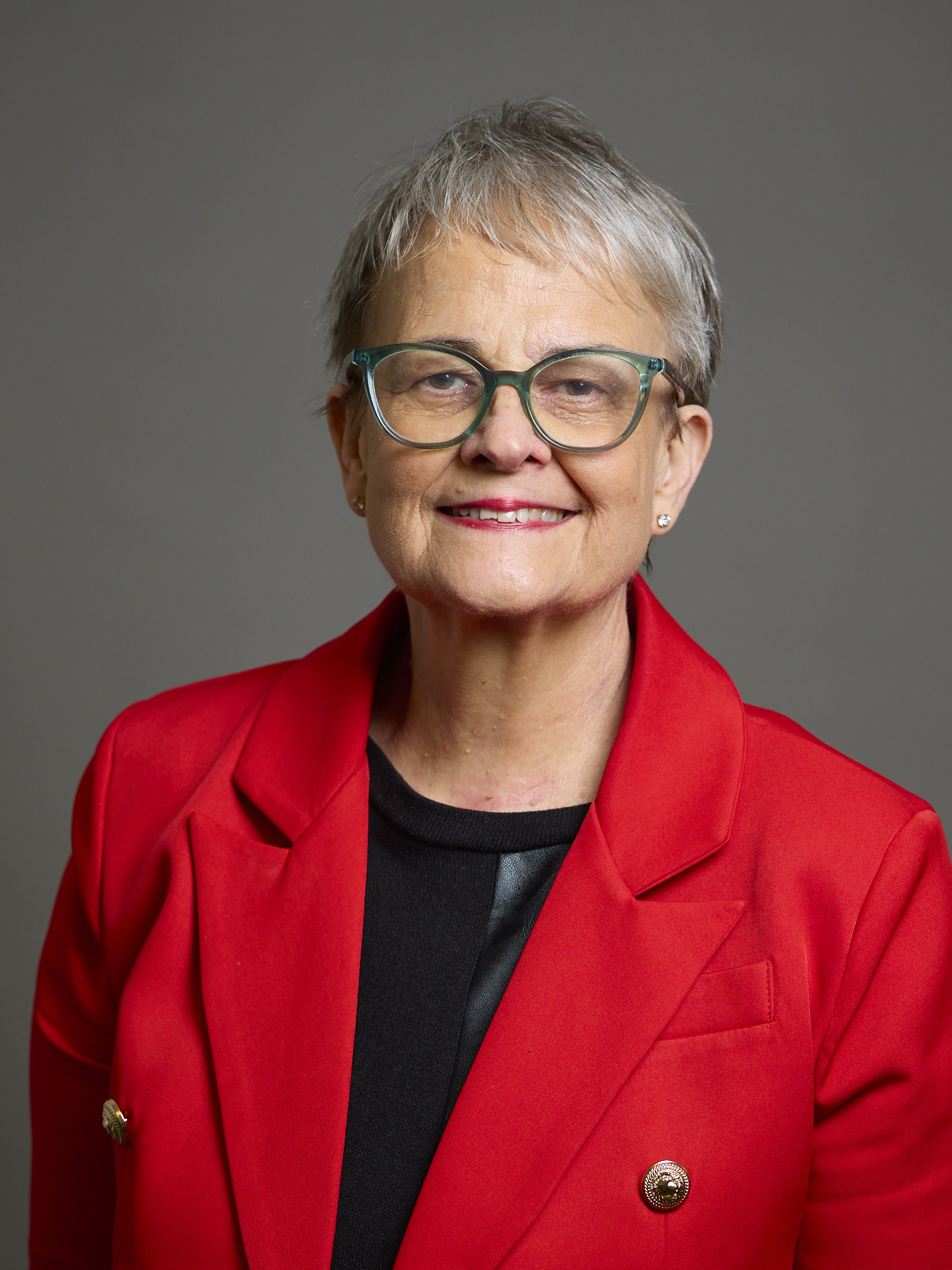
- Official portrait, 2025

Leader of the Social Democratic and Labour Party
- In office 7 February 2010 – 5 November 2011
- Deputy: Patsy McGlone
- General Sec.: Gerry Cosgrove
- Chairman: Joe Byrne
- Preceded by: Mark Durkan
- Succeeded by: Alasdair McDonnell

Minister for Social Development
- In office 8 May 2007 – 7 February 2010
- First Minister: Ian Paisley; Peter Robinson; Arlene Foster (Acting)
- Preceded by: Nigel Dodds
- Succeeded by: Alex Attwood

Member of the House of Lords
- Lord Temporal
- Life peerage 16 October 2019

Member of Parliament for South Down
- In office 6 May 2010 – 3 May 2017
- Preceded by: Eddie McGrady
- Succeeded by: Chris Hazzard

Member of the Legislative Assembly for South Down
- In office 26 November 2003 – 31 March 2012
- Preceded by: Eddie McGrady
- Succeeded by: Seán Rogers

Personal details
- Born: 25 March 1958 (age 68) Downpatrick, County Down, Northern Ireland
- Party: Labour (2021–present)
- Other political affiliations: Independent (2019–2021); SDLP (1980–2019)
- Education: Queen's University Belfast
- Website: Official website

Margaret Mary Ritchie, Baroness Ritchie of Downpatrick (born 25 March 1958), is a Northern Irish politician who was the Leader of the Social Democratic and Labour Party (SDLP) from 2010 to 2011. She was previously a Member of the Northern Ireland Assembly (MLA) for South Down from 2003 to 2012, and was the Minister for Social Development in the Northern Ireland Executive from 2007 to 2010. Ritchie was the Member of Parliament (MP) for South Down from 2010 to 2017. She became a life peer in 2019 initially as a non-affiliated member, and then from October 2021 as a Labour member.

== Political career ==
Ritchie is a graduate of The Queen's University of Belfast, and served as parliamentary assistant to Eddie McGrady, MP, from 1987 to 2003. Ritchie became a councillor on Down District Council in 1985 and was vice-chairman (1992–93) and chairman of the council (1993–1994). She has also served as international secretary of the SDLP and as an alternate member of the European Committee of the Regions.

She was nominated as the social development minister in the Northern Ireland Assembly by the SDLP which took effect on 8 May 2007. Ritchie served as the sole SDLP minister in the Paisley/Robinson-McGuinness Northern Ireland Executive up to 2010.

== Leadership ==
She became the leader of the SDLP, succeeding Mark Durkan on 7 February 2010, and was elected MP for South Down on 6 May 2010.

On Remembrance Day 2010, Ritchie became the first leader of an Irish nationalist party to wear a remembrance poppy. She wore it at the wreath-laying ceremony at the cenotaph in Downpatrick. In Northern Ireland, the wearing of poppies is controversial as it is seen by many as a political symbol representing support for the British Army. Because of this, it has long been the preserve of the unionist/loyalist community. She received praise from several unionist councillors for this.

In December 2010 she launched a verbal attack on Sinn Féin by urging voters in the Republic of Ireland not to vote for Sinn Féin in the next Irish general election, describing their politics as 'sectarian' and causing 'division'. A Sinn Féin spokesperson described the comments as "nonsense" and "an attempt to score cheap points".

In 2011, she voted against the military intervention in Libya.

In the 2011 Northern Ireland Assembly election, the SDLP lost two seats and saw its vote decline by 1%. On 27 July 2011 it was reported that she faced a leadership challenge from deputy leader Patsy McGlone. The Phoenix reported that only one MLA, Alex Attwood, was prepared to back her and that "she will be humiliated if she puts her leadership to a vote". She stepped down in November 2011.

In a leaked US diplomatic cable, Ritchie was branded "wooden" and had her leadership of the SDLP questioned. Also she was considered to be burdened "with what some deem an unpleasant speaking voice" and lacking the "political muscle and business acumen" to rebuild the SDLP.

Ritchie announced when leaving the leadership of the SDLP that she would also vacate her seat in the Northern Ireland Assembly in order to concentrate on her role as a Member of Parliament, and the SDLP subsequently selected retired headteacher Seán Rodgers to replace her at Stormont. She submitted a letter of resignation to the Assembly at the end of February 2012, to take effect on 31 March.

== Post-leadership ==
Ritchie spoke to senior Ulster Bank officials to emphasise the need for them to fully reimburse customers following their computer failure in 2012, saying: "Many customers are still experiencing difficulties with Ulster Bank in that they haven't been fully reimbursed for the money they lost as a result of the bank's computer system failure. This has been compounded by a complete lack of communication from the bank throughout the difficulties their customers have been experiencing."

She lost her seat in the 2017 UK General election to the Sinn Féin candidate, Chris Hazzard.

=== Peerage ===
On 10 September 2019 it was announced that Ritchie had accepted a life peerage as part of Theresa May's resignation honours list. Ritchie was created The Baroness Ritchie of Downpatrick, of Downpatrick in the County of Down, on 16 October 2019. Due to the SDLP policy of not supporting appointments to the House of Lords, Ritchie resigned from the SDLP and decided to take a non-affiliated position in the chamber. However, on 20 October 2021, she joined the Labour Party and now sits as a Labour member.

Northern Ireland Forum
New forum	Member of the Northern Ireland Forum for South Down; 1996–1998	Forum dissolved
Northern Ireland Assembly
Preceded by Eddie McGrady	Member of the Legislative Assembly for South Down; 2003–2012	Succeeded by Seán Rogers
Political offices
Vacant Office suspended Title last held by Nigel Dodds	Minister for Social Development; 2007–2010	Succeeded by Alex Attwood
Preceded by Mark Durkan	Leader of the Social Democratic and Labour Party; 2010–2011	Succeeded by Alasdair McDonnell
Parliament of the United Kingdom
Preceded by Eddie McGrady	Member of Parliament for South Down; 2010–2017	Succeeded by Chris Hazzard
