= Social Democratic and Labour Party =

Political party in Northern Ireland

Social Democratic and Labour Party Páirtí Sóisialta agus Daonlathach an Lucht Oibre
- Abbreviation: SDLP
- Leader: Claire Hanna
- President: Bríd Rodgers
- Chairperson: Daniel McCrossan
- Founders: List: Gerry Fitt; John Hume; Ivan Cooper; Austin Currie; Paddy Devlin; Paddy O'Hanlon; Paddy Wilson
- Founded: 21 August 1970; 56 years ago
- Preceded by: List: National Democratic Party; Factions: Irish Labour Party; Nationalist Party; Northern Ireland Labour Party; Republican Labour Party; Ulster Liberal Party
- Headquarters: 121 Ormeau Road; Belfast; BT7 1SH
- Youth wing: SDLP Youth
- Women's wing: SDLP Women
- LGBTQIA+ wing: SDLP LGBT+
- Disability Wing: SDLP Disabled Members
- Ideology: Social democracy; Irish reunification; Irish nationalism
- Political position: Centre-left
- European affiliation: Party of European Socialists
- European Parliament group: Progressive Alliance of Socialists and Democrats (observer)
- International affiliation: Socialist International
- Great Britain affiliation: Labour Party
- Colours: Red; Green (until 2025)
- House of Commons (NI seats): 2 / 18
- NI Assembly: 8 / 90
- Councillors in Northern Ireland: 36 / 462
- Councils led in Northern Ireland: 1 / 11

Website
- sdlp.ie

The Social Democratic and Labour Party (SDLP; Irish: Páirtí Sóisialta agus Daonlathach an Lucht Oibre) is a social democratic and Irish nationalist political party in Northern Ireland. The SDLP currently has eight members in the Northern Ireland Assembly (MLAs) and two members of Parliament (MPs) in the House of Commons of the United Kingdom.

The SDLP party platform advocates Irish reunification and, pending the unity of all the people of Ireland and while the northern jurisdiction remains part of the United Kingdom, further devolution of powers. It is a sister party of the UK Labour Party, which maintains an electoral pact with the SDLP not to stand candidates in Northern Ireland but to support SDLP candidates instead. MPs from the SDLP sit with Labour MPs on the government benches when Labour is in power, but do not take the Labour whip, though they informally did so historically.

During the Troubles, the SDLP was the most popular Irish nationalist party in Northern Ireland, but since the Provisional IRA ceasefire in 1994, it has lost ground to the republican party Sinn Féin, which in 2001 became the more popular of the two parties for the first time. Established during the Troubles, a significant difference between the two parties was the SDLP's rejection of violence, in contrast to Sinn Féin's then-support for (and organisational ties to) the Provisional IRA and physical force republicanism.

== Ideology and policies ==
The SDLP is a social democratic party that opposes austerity and Brexit.

The party is an Irish nationalist party advocating for a united Ireland, however, unlike the other nationalist party Sinn Féin, the party is viewed as more pragmatic and moderate on the subject. For example, unlike Sinn Féin they are not calling for an immediate date for a border poll. The SDLP is not abstentionist in regards to Westminster and the party cooperates fully with UK political and constitutional institutions.

While the party is officially anti-abortion, it does not apply a party whip on the issue. They also are "open to a change in the law" on assisted dying. The party supports LGBT rights including marriage equality, the roll out of PrEP across Northern Ireland and LGBT education in schools. The SDLP is anti-xenophobic and opposes plans to create what it deems a hostile environment for immigrants. The party also supports an Irish language act.

The SDLP believes that 3,000 social and affordable houses should be built every year. They oppose the gig economy and zero-hour contracts. The party opposes welfare reform and the cut to universal credit.

Despite opposing academic selection, the party does not advocate the abolition of grammar schools. The party supports the abolition of tuition fees. It wants to make a modern language up to GCSE and the teaching of maths up to the age of 18 compulsory.

The party believes that the Magee campus in Derry should be expanded to 10,000 student places.

The party supports a green corporate levy on businesses who contribute large amounts of greenhouse gases and a green jobs strategy. They also believe that a climate emergency should be declared and the government should be required to reach net zero emissions.

== History ==
=== Foundation and early history (1970–1972) ===
The party was founded on 21 August 1970, when six Stormont MPs (Gerry Fitt, Republican Labour Party; Austin Currie, Nationalist Party; Paddy Devlin, Northern Ireland Labour Party; John Hume, Ivan Cooper and Paddy O'Hanlon, Independent) and one Senator (Paddy Wilson, Republican Labour), joined to form a new party. They were joined on 10 November by a second Senator (Claude Wilton, Ulster Liberal Party), bringing the total parliamentary party to eight members. Gerry Fitt was chosen to lead the new party while John Hume was appointed its deputy. Paddy Wilson also became the party's first General Secretary.

The smaller National Democratic Party dissolved itself in October of that year and encouraged all its members to join the new party. Additionally, individual members and branches from other parties joined including from the Irish Labour Party, Nationalist Party, Northern Ireland Labour Party, Republican Labour Party and Ulster Liberal Party.

The SDLP contested its first election in a by-election for the Belfast St. Anne's seat on 12 November. Their candidate Gerry Lavery won 24.2% of the vote in the traditionally Unionist seat.

The SDLP initially rejected the Nationalist Party's policy of abstentionism and sought to fight for civil rights within the Stormont system. However, the SDLP quickly came to the view that Stormont was unreformable, refusing to attend the state opening on 18 June 1971, and withdrawing altogether in response the shooting dead of Seamus Cusack and Desmond Beattie in Derry on 8 July.

On 15 August the SDLP announced they would lead a Campaign of Civil Disobedience in response to the introduction of internment the previous week. This involved the withdrawal of SDLP representatives from public bodies, the organisation of a rent and rates strike and SDLP MPs participating in a 48 hour hunger strike outside 10 Downing Street.

The SDLP held its first annual conference in Dungiven on 23 October that year. The party adopted its draft constitution, Eddie McGrady was elected the party's first chairman while Sheila Carson becomes its first secretary. Several motions were passed including committing the party firmly to socialism, supporting the parliamentary party's decision to withdraw from Stormont and condemning the 11-plus.

After the abolition of the Parliament of Northern Ireland in 1972, the SDLP emerged as the largest party representing the nationalist community. On 20 September the party issued its first major policy document, entitled "Towards a New Ireland". It recommended that the British Government issue a declaration that it would recognise that Ireland is better off united, and that as an interim proposal Northern Ireland should be administered jointly by the British and Irish Governments. It also proposed the establishment of a National Senate drawn equally from a devolved Assembly in Belfast and the Oireachtas in Dublin to plan for the integration of the island.

=== Sunningdale Agreement (1973–1974) ===
The first major electoral contest for the SDLP were elections to Northern Ireland's 26 new district councils, held on 30 May 1973. The SDLP won 13.4% of the vote and 82 seats, becoming the second largest party in Northern Ireland and the largest party in the districts of Derry, Magherafelt and Newry and Mourne. Other nationalist parties failed to achieve much success, leaving the SDLP as the largest party representing the nationalist community.

Paddy Wilson, the SDLP's General Secretary and councillor in the new Belfast City Council was murdered on the 26 June, two days before the election to the new Northern Ireland Assembly. Wilson and another woman, Irene Andrews, were killed by the UFF, a codename for the UDA. John White was later convicted for his part in the killings.

Following publication of the British Government's White Paper, elections were held to the new Northern Ireland Assembly on 28 June, where the party won 19 out of 75 seats and once again emerged as the voice of the nationalist community, increasing its vote share to 22% of the vote. Negotiations occurred throughout October and November on the formation of a new power-sharing Executive to govern Northern Ireland with the SDLP, UUP and Alliance taking part. On 21 November Northern Ireland Secretary of State, William Whitelaw, announced that agreement had been reached on the composition and functions of the new Executive, with the SDLP entitled to four of the eleven members and a further two non-Executive office holders. Agreement was still to be reached on many other aspects of the White Paper, particularly regarding the Council of Ireland.

Following discussions between the British Prime Minister and Irish Taoiseach, as well as the political parties, it was announced on 9 December at Sunningdale that an agreement had been reached on the remaining elements of the White Paper, including the implementation of a Council of Ireland.

On 1 January 1974 the Northern Ireland Executive took office, with Gerry Fitt as Deputy Chief Executive, John Hume as Minister of Commerce, Paddy Devlin as Minister of Health and Social Services and Austin Currie as Minister of Housing, Local Government and Planning.

The SDLP faced its first Westminster election shortly afterwards in February in what became a referendum on power-sharing. The anti-power-sharing Unionists united under the UUUC banner and won 11 seats, with Gerry Fitt being the only pro-power-sharing MP returned, dealing a critical blow to the fledgling Executive. The Executive eventually collapsed after 5 months following several weeks of the Ulster Workers' Council strike.

=== Searching for agreement (1975–1980) ===
Attempting to find agreement, the Secretary of State called elections for a Constitutional Convention on 1 May 1975, for which the SDLP won 17 seats and 24% of the vote. The UUUC however won a majority of seats and votes, the Constitutional Convention made no progress and the British Government brought it to an end in early 1976. Later that year on 1 September SDLP member Denis Mullen was shot dead at his home.

Following the failure of the Constitutional Convention the SDLP continued searching for a long term solution, at times engaging in talks with the UUP. In 1977 the party issued a policy document titled "Facing Reality". This called for the party to put a stronger emphasis on the "Irish dimension". In response to this perceived move away from the party's Labour values Paddy Devlin, then party chairperson, resigned from the party.

In 1978 SDLP deputy leader John Hume presented his proposal for an "agreed Ireland". In contrast to the two main options at the time of full integration into Britain or full withdrawal, Hume's solution proposed the British government declaring that its aim was to bring the main traditions in Ireland together in reconciliation.

After years of little progress 1979 brought considerably more action for the SDLP. A vote of confidence in the Labour Government failed in March that year. Gerry Fitt abstained on the vote as the Government had failed to act on the Bennett Report into RUC interrogation techniques. In the following general election, the Conservatives came to power in Westminster and Fitt held his seat in Belfast West.

In June that year the first direct election to the European Parliament were held. The SDLP candidate was John Hume who won a seat with 25% of the first preference vote. He went on to sit in the Socialist Group in the European Parliament.

The new Conservative Secretary of State, Humphrey Atkins, invited Northern Ireland parties including the SDLP to a conference on the future of Northern Ireland. There was intense debate in the SDLP whether or not to attend a conference which would not discuss any all-island dimension, with Gerry Fitt wanting to attend regardless of any discussion on an "Irish dimension" while many others, including John Hume, refusing to attend. As a result of this dispute Fitt resigned as SDLP leader. On 28 November John Hume was elected as his replacement, and Seamus Mallon became his deputy.

The SDLP eventually made the decision to attend the Atkins conference, on the condition that there would be parallel discussions involving the "Irish dimension". These talks, like others, failed to reach agreement.

=== Entry of Sinn Féin (1981–1982) ===
Following the death of Fermanagh and South Tyrone MP Frank Maguire and the selection of hunger striker Bobby Sands as a candidate in the following by-election the SDLP decided to withdraw Austin Currie as their candidate. The election was held on 9 April and Bobby Sands won the seat by a slim margin. As the strikes went on, SDLP leader John Hume met Prime Minister Margaret Thatcher to ask that she concede some of the demands of the hunger strikers. No agreement was forthcoming. When Sands died, the SDLP also stood aside for Owen Carron, who also won the seat by a narrow margin.

The hunger strikes also had an impact on the electoral fortunes of the SDLP. In local government elections in 1981 the SDLP vote share fell to 17.5% as nationalist voters began to support more candidates from parties like the Irish Independence Party and Irish Republican Socialist Party.

In Spring 1982 Northern Ireland Secretary of State Jim Prior proposed "rolling devolution" by which a consultative Assembly be established. John Hume labelled the proposals as unworkable as they offered no realistic prospect of power-sharing or offered any role for the Irish Government.

In May of that year the SDLP secured a seat in Seanad Éireann as new Taoiseach Charles Haughey appointed SDLP Deputy Leader Seamus Mallon to serve as a voice for Northern nationalists.

As the elections to the Assembly approached the party announced that although it would contest the election, none of its representatives would take their seats. The election, held on 20 October, mirrored the SDLP's performance in the local elections the previous year as the party won 18.8% of the vote and took 14 seats. The decision by Sinn Féin to stand also had an impact on the SDLP vote as the party, considered to be the political wing of the Provisional IRA, took 10.1% of the vote and 5 seats.

As a result of Seamus Mallon's membership of Seanad Éireann he was removed as a member of the Assembly and a by-election was held in Armagh the following spring. The SDLP called for a boycott and amidst low turnout the UUP won the election.

=== New Ireland Forum (1983–1984) ===
In the lead up to the 1982 Assembly election the SDLP proposed a "Council for a New Ireland" in its manifesto. This, with the assistance of the Irish Government, was realised in the creation of the New Ireland Forum in March 1983. It was a forum "all democratic parties which reject violence and which have members elected or appointed to either House of the Oireachtas or the Northern Ireland Assembly". The SDLP, along with Fianna Fáil, Fine Gael and Labour all joined. The Forum met for the first time on 30 May with five SDLP members: John Hume, Austin Currie, Joe Hendron, Eddie McGrady and Seamus Mallon.

Submissions were taken from sectors, individuals and organisations across the island of Ireland, examining the long-term future of the island. After a year of work the Forum published its report in May 1984, detailing three possible structures for a new Ireland. The three options of a unitary state, federal/confederal state and joint authority were rooted in previous SDLP policy and went on to influence the policies of the Irish Government and the major political parties in the Republic in relation to Northern Ireland in the following decade.

In the general election in June 1983 the SDLP failed to regain the seat in Belfast West it had lost when Gerry Fitt resigned from the party. However, John Hume was elected to the House of Commons for the new constituency of Foyle. The following year Hume also retained his seat in the European Parliament.

=== Anglo-Irish Agreement (1985–1987) ===
Throughout the 1970s and 80s SDLP leader John Hume used his connections with influential Irish-American politicians Tip O'Neill, Ted Kennedy, Daniel Moynihan and Hugh Carey to push the SDLP's analysis of the division and conflict on the island of Ireland. The "Four Horsemen" and other senior politicians persuaded President Ronald Reagan to encourage British Prime Minister Margaret Thatcher to work with the Irish Government to agree a collective way forward. Negotiations began in early 1985 and concluded on 15 November with the signing of the Anglo-Irish Agreement.

Although the agreement was supported by the SDLP, it faced considerable opposition from Unionist parties. Fifteen Unionist MPs resigned their Westminster seats forcing by-elections in January 1986. The SDLP targeted constituencies where support for the Anglo-Irish Agreement was strongest and subsequently managed to win Newry and Armagh, where deputy leader Seamus Mallon won the seat from the Ulster Unionists.

This success continued into the 1987 general election where the SDLP's support for the agreement saw its vote rise to levels last seen when the party was first founded in the early 70s, mostly at the expense of Sinn Féin. In addition to holding both their current seats, Eddie McGrady won the seat of South Down from Enoch Powell, finally ending his political career.

=== Hume-Adams Talks (1988–1994) ===
In January 1988 SDLP Leader John Hume began a series of secret talks with Sinn Féin President Gerry Adams which lasted until August of that year.

The following year local government elections were held. These elections saw the Party's best result at a local election since its foundation, winning 21% of the vote and 121 seats. These came mostly at the expense of Sinn Féin, who voters began to turn away from following a number of IRA atrocities. In the European Election that June, John Hume increased the SDLP vote to 25%. In April 1992 the SDLP reached their electoral high point, as Joe Hendron won the Belfast West seat at the expense of Gerry Adams. The SDLP now had four MPs.

In late 1992, knowledge of talks between John Hume and Gerry Adams became public. The talks were criticised by many, both within the SDLP and outside. The talks would eventually lead to the Downing Street Declaration by British Prime Minister John Major and Taoiseach Albert Reynolds, which laid the ground for a ceasefire and negotiations.

Throughout 1994, SDLP representatives continued to face attacks from paramilitaries, as loyalists burnt out Joe Hendron's car while Councillor John Fee was beaten by Republicans outside his home. On 31 August the IRA announced a ceasefire, followed shortly afterwards by the loyalist paramilitaries. Hume, Adams and Reynolds met in Dublin and publicly shook hands. The SDLP Leader called for peace negotiations to begin without delay.

=== Good Friday Agreement (1995–1998) ===
Throughout 1995 the SDLP continued to engage in talks with the Irish and British Governments, and with other political parties to establish formal all-party talks. They suggested appointing former US Senator George Mitchell to oversee an international body on arms decommissioning. The Government then established this body which produced the "Mitchell Principles" which parties will be required to meet if they were to enter talks. Following this, the Prime Minister John Major announced details of an election to a Forum which will comprise the parties involved in talks. The election took place in May 1996 where the SDLP took 24% of the vote and 21 seats.

Leading up to the next general election there was some speculation on the SDLP forming an electoral pact with Sinn Féin. SDLP Leader John Hume stated that this would only be considered in the event of an IRA ceasefire and Sinn Féin agreeing to end their policy of abstentionism. The May 1997 election yielded mixed results for the SDLP. The party increased its vote share to its highest ever level, however lost their seat in Belfast West to Sinn Féin. In the local elections held a few weeks later the SDLP also increased its vote share but lost seven seats. After the election Alban Maginness was appointed Lord Mayor of Belfast, becoming the first nationalist to hold this position.

Following changes of government in Ireland and the UK talks reconvened in autumn of 1997. The SDLP participated in these talks alongside other parties. Agreement was finally reached on 10 April 1998 when the SDLP, seven other parties, the British and Irish Governments signed the Good Friday Agreement. In the subsequent referendum the SDLP campaigned for a "Yes" vote, with SDLP leader John Hume appearing onstage with U2 frontman Bono and UUP leader David Trimble. The result was a resounding victory for the "Yes" campaign, who secured 71.12% in Northern Ireland. Both Hume and Trimble won the Nobel Peace Prize later that year for their efforts in securing the Agreement.

As a result of the Agreement, elections to a new Northern Ireland Assembly were held in June 1998; the SDLP emerged as the second-largest party overall, and the largest nationalist party, with 24 out of 108 seats. The party was then returned to government later in the year when a power-sharing Executive was established for Northern Ireland. The SDLP took office alongside the Ulster Unionist Party (UUP), the Democratic Unionist Party (DUP), and Sinn Féin, and the SDLP's Seamus Mallon became Deputy First Minister alongside the UUP's First Minister, David Trimble.

Upon Mallon's retirement in 2001, Mark Durkan succeeded him as Deputy First Minister.

=== All-island Merger ===
There had been a debate in the party on the prospects of amalgamation with Fianna Fáil. Little came of this speculation and former party leader Margaret Ritchie, Baroness Ritchie of Downpatrick rejected the idea. Speaking at the 2010 Irish Labour Party national conference in Galway she said that a merger would not happen while she was leader – "Merger with Fianna Fáil? Not on my watch." After his election as Fianna Fáil Leader in January 2011, Micheál Martin repeatedly dismissed the possibility of a merger or electoral alliance with the SDLP. In January 2019, the SDLP membership were e-mailed on the issue with the text "continuing on as normal is not an option", a reference to the party's declining fortunes.

In February 2019, at a special party conference, the members approved a partnership with Fianna Fáil, the main opposition party in the Republic of Ireland. Both parties shared policies on key areas, including addressing the current political situation in Northern Ireland, improving public services in both jurisdictions of Ireland, such as healthcare and education, and bringing about further unity and co-operation of the people on the island and arrangements for a future poll on Irish reunification.

Claire Hanna, MLA for Belfast South and party spokesperson on Brexit, quit the assembly group as a result.

In the lead up to the 2022 Assembly election, party leader Colum Eastwood played down the partnership stating, "The SDLP stands on its own two feet." This led people to commentate that the partnership is no longer active, with comments from as early as 2020 determining that it had been "quietly forgotten". The partnership officially ended on 28 September 2022.

=== Westminster Parliament ===
In contrast to Sinn Féin, which follows a policy of abstentionism, the SDLP MPs have always taken their seat in the Westminster parliament. The party's first MP was leader Gerry Fitt who was already a sitting MP when the SDLP was founded. The SDLP's best result was in 1992 general election when they won four out of 17 seats. Its worst result was in 2017 when they lost all their seats. In 2019 they won two seats.

Although not abstentionist, some SDLP MPs have protested the parliamentary oath required of every member of parliament. At the swearing in ceremony after the 2019 general election, the party leader Colum Eastwood said:

"Under protest and in order to represent my constituency, I do solemnly, sincerely and truly declare and affirm that I will be faithful and bear true allegiance to Her Majesty Queen Elizabeth, her heirs and successors, according to law. My true allegiance is to the people of Derry and the people of Ireland."

=== Proposed Dáil participation ===
The SDLP, along with Sinn Féin, have long sought speaking rights in Dáil Éireann, the lower house of the Republic's parliament. In 2005, Taoiseach Bertie Ahern, leader of Fianna Fáil, put forward a proposal to allow MPs and MEPs from Northern Ireland to participate in debates on the region. However, the plan was met with vociferous opposition from the Republic's main opposition parties, Fine Gael and the Labour Party, and was subsequently shelved. Unionists had also strongly opposed the proposal.

=== Remembrance Day 2010 ===
On Remembrance Day in 2010, party leader Margaret Ritchie became the first leader of a nationalist party to wear a poppy while attending a wreath-laying ceremony in Downpatrick, County Down. The poppy is worn on the lapel in the United Kingdom as a mark of respect and remembrance for fallen British soldiers in the period around Remembrance Day and is controversial in Northern Ireland, as it is viewed by many as a political symbol representing support for the British Army. Because of this, it has long been the preserve of the unionist/loyalist community. Her actions drew praise from unionists.

=== Leadership challenges and elections (2011–2024) ===
On 27 July 2011, it was reported that Margaret Ritchie faced a leadership challenge from deputy leader Patsy McGlone. The Phoenix reported that only one MLA, Alex Attwood was prepared to back her and that "she will be humiliated if she puts her leadership to a vote".

Alasdair McDonnell was confirmed as Ritchie's successor after the subsequent leadership election on 5 November 2011.

Colum Eastwood challenged McDonnell and replaced him as leader after the party's 2015 leadership election.

Eastwood stood down as leader in 2024. Deputy leader Claire Hanna, was selected to replace Eastwood during the 2024 leadership election when she ran unopposed. Ratification for the new party leadership took place at a conference in October 2024.

== Leadership ==
Claire Hanna is the seventh leader of the SDLP, taking over from Colum Eastwood in 2024.

=== List of leaders ===
No.	Leader (birth–death)	Constituency	Took office	Left office
1	Gerry Fitt (1926–2005)	MP (Parliament of Northern Ireland) for Belfast Dock (1962–1972); MP (UK Parliament) for Belfast West (1966–1983)	21 August 1970	22 November 1979
2	John Hume (1937–2020)	MP (Parliament of Northern Ireland) for Foyle (1969–1972); MEP for Northern Ireland (1979–2004); MP (UK Parliament) for Foyle (1983–2005); MLA for Foyle (1998–2000)	28 November 1979 (acting from 22 November 1979)	11 November 2001
3	Mark Durkan (b. 1960)	MLA for Foyle (1998–2010); MP for Foyle (2005–2017)	11 November 2001	7 February 2010
4	Margaret Ritchie (b. 1958)	MLA for South Down (2003–2012); MP for South Down (2010–2017)	7 February 2010 (elected)	5 November 2011
5	Alasdair McDonnell (b. 1949)	MLA for Belfast South (1998–2015); MP for Belfast South (2005–2017)	5 November 2011 (elected)	14 November 2015
6	Colum Eastwood (b. 1983)	MLA for Foyle (2011–2019); MP for Foyle (from 2019)	14 November 2015 (elected)	5 October 2024
7	Claire Hanna (b. 1980)	MLA for Belfast South (2015–2019); MP for Belfast South (2019–2024); MP for Belfast South and Mid Down (2024–present)	5 October 2024 (elected)	incumbent

=== List of deputy leaders ===
No.	Deputy leader (birth–death)	Constituency	Took office	Left office	Leader
1	John Hume (1937–2020)	MP (Parliament of Northern Ireland) for Foyle (1969–1972); MEP for Northern Ireland (1979–2004); MP (UK Parliament) for Foyle (1983–2005); MLA for Foyle (1998–2000)	21 August 1970	28 November 1979	Gerry Fitt
2	Seamus Mallon (1936–2020)	MP for Newry and Armagh (1986–2005); MLA for Newry and Armagh (1998–2003)	28 November 1979	11 November 2001	John Hume
3	Bríd Rodgers (b. 1935)	MLA for Upper Bann (1998–2003)	11 November 2001	22 February 2004	Mark Durkan
4	Alasdair McDonnell (b. 1949)	MLA for Belfast South (1998–2015); MP for Belfast South (2005–2017)	22 February 2004	7 November 2010	Mark Durkan
5	Patsy McGlone (b. 1959)	MLA for Mid-Ulster (from 2003)	7 February 2010	5 November 2011	Margaret Ritchie
6	Dolores Kelly (b. 1959)	MLA for Upper Bann (2003–2016; 2017–2022)	5 November 2011	14 November 2015	Alasdair McDonnell
7	Fearghal McKinney (b. 1962)	MLA for Belfast South (2013–2016)	14 November 2015	5 May 2016	Colum Eastwood
Position Vacant					Colum Eastwood
8	Nichola Mallon (b. 1979)	MLA for Belfast North (2016–2022)	12 September 2017	5 May 2022	Colum Eastwood
Position Vacant					Colum Eastwood
Position Abolished

== Elected representatives ==
The SDLP currently have two MPs in the UK Parliament, eight MLAs in the Northern Ireland Assembly and 36 councillors across Northern Ireland's 11 councils.

Northern Ireland council seats
- Antrim and Newtownabbey Borough Council: 1 / 40
- Ards and North Down Borough Council: 1 / 40
- Armagh City, Banbridge and Craigavon Borough Council: 1 / 41
- Belfast City Council: 5 / 60
- Causeway Coast and Glens Borough Council: 3 / 40
- Derry City and Strabane District Council: 8 / 40
- Fermanagh and Omagh District Council: 2 / 40
- Lisburn and Castlereagh City Council: 2 / 40
- Mid and East Antrim Borough Council: 0 / 40
- Mid Ulster District Council: 5 / 40
- Newry, Mourne and Down District Council: 8 / 41

=== MPs ===
MP	Constituency	Period	Notes
Colum Eastwood	Foyle	2019–present	Foyle MLA 2011–2019
Claire Hanna	Belfast South and Mid Down	2024–present	SDLP Leader; Belfast South MLA 2015–2019; Belfast South MP 2019–2024

=== MLAs ===
MLA	Constituency	Period	Notes
Mark H. Durkan	Foyle	2011–present	Spokesperson for Communities
Cara Hunter	East Londonderry	2020–present	Spokesperson for Education
Daniel McCrossan	West Tyrone	2015–present	SDLP Chairperson; Spokesperson for Agriculture, Environment and Rural Affairs
Patsy McGlone	Mid Ulster	2003–present	Spokesperson for Justice
Colin McGrath	South Down	2016–present	SDLP Chief Whip; Spokesperson for Health
Sinead McLaughlin	Foyle	2020–present	Spokesperson for the Economy and the Executive Office
Justin McNulty	Newry and Armagh	2016–present	Spokesperson for Infrastructure
Matthew O'Toole	Belfast South	2020–present	Leader of the Opposition; Spokesperson for Finance

== Electoral performance ==
Upon its formation, the SDLP quickly established itself as the second largest party and the largest nationalist party in Northern Ireland. It largely held this position until the beginning of the 21st century. In the 1998 Assembly election, it became the biggest party overall in terms of votes received and the first nationalist party to do so. This would be the largest seat share it would ever hold as it slowly saw declining support following the retirement of John Hume in 2001.

Under leader Mark Durkan, the 2001 general election and the 2003 Assembly election saw fellow Irish nationalist party Sinn Féin win more seats and votes than the SDLP for the first time, a position they would continue to hold. In the 2004 European elections, Hume stood down and the SDLP failed to retain the seat he had held since 1979, losing it to Sinn Féin. Alban Maginness attempted to take the seat again in the 2009 European elections the party fielded as their candidate and failed to gain a seat with 78,489 first preference votes. The party further declined in the 2011 Assembly elections and the 2016 Assembly election, as the total number of votes received continued to drop.

The 2017 Assembly election saw the party retain its 12-seat count from the prior election, increasing its seat share due to a drop in the size of the assembly for the first time since 1998. This was followed by the 2017 general election where the SDLP lost all three seats and returned its worst ever vote share. In the 2019 European election, the final in the United Kingdom's history, party leader Colum Eastwood ran, increasing his party's vote but failing to take a seat. In the general election later that year the party recaptured Belfast South and Foyle with the highest ever vote recorded for the party in both constituencies and managed to increase its vote across Northern Ireland to its highest in almost fifteen years for a general election. The two seats held by the party currently have the largest majorities of any constituencies in Northern Ireland.

In the 2022 Assembly election, the SDLP slipped to the 5th largest party with only eight seats in the Assembly.

Some see the SDLP as first and foremost a party now representing Catholic middle-class interests, with voters concentrated in rural areas and the professional classes, rather than a vehicle for Irish nationalism. The SDLP reject this argument, pointing to their strong support in Derry and their victory in South Belfast in the 2005 Westminster election. Furthermore, in the lead up to that election, they published a document outlining their plans for a politically united Ireland. Their decline in Northern Ireland outside of two particular strongholds had led some to dub the party, the "South Down and Londonderry Party".

=== Devolved legislature elections ===
Election	Leader	Body	Votes	%	Seats	+/–	Position	Status
1973	Gerry Fitt	Assembly	159,773	22.1	19 / 78	▲19	▲2nd	Coalition
1975	Gerry Fitt	Constitutional; Convention	156,049	23.7	17 / 78	▼2	2nd	Consultative
1982	John Hume	Assembly	118,891	18.8	14 / 78	▼3	▼3rd	Abstention
1996	John Hume	Forum	160,786	21.4	21 / 110	▲7	3rd	Consultative
1998	John Hume	Assembly	177,963	22.0	24 / 108	▲3	▲2nd	Coalition
2003	Mark Durkan	Assembly	117,547	17.0	18 / 108	▼6	▼4th	Direct rule
2007	Mark Durkan	Assembly	105,164	15.2	16 / 108	▼2	4th	Coalition
2011	Margaret Ritchie	Assembly	94,286	14.2	14 / 108	▼2	4th	Coalition
2016	Colum Eastwood	Assembly	83,364	12.0	12 / 108	▼2	4th	Opposition
2017	Colum Eastwood	Assembly	95,958	11.9	12 / 90	Steady	▲3rd	Coalition
2022	Colum Eastwood	Assembly	78,237	9.1	8 / 90	▼4	▼5th	Opposition

=== Westminster elections ===
Election	Leader	Votes	%		Seats (NI)	+/–	Position	Status
Election	Leader	Votes	NI	UK	Seats (NI)	+/–	Position	Status
Feb 1974	Gerry Fitt	160,137	22.4	0.5	1 / 12	▲1	▲3rd	Opposition
Oct 1974	Gerry Fitt	154,193	22.0	0.6	1 / 12	Steady	3rd	Opposition
1979	Gerry Fitt	126,325	18.2	0.4	1 / 12	Steady	3rd	Opposition
1983	John Hume	137,012	17.9	0.4	1 / 17	Steady	3rd	Opposition
1987	John Hume	154,067	21.1	0.5	3 / 17	▲2	▲2nd	Opposition
1992	John Hume	184,445	23.5	0.5	4 / 17	▲1	2nd	Opposition
1997	John Hume	190,814	24.1	0.6	3 / 18	▼1	2nd	Opposition
2001	John Hume	169,865	21.0	0.6	3 / 18	Steady	▼4th	Opposition
2005	Mark Durkan	125,626	17.5	0.5	3 / 18	Steady	▲3rd	Opposition
2010	Margaret Ritchie	110,970	16.5	0.4	3 / 18	Steady	3rd	Opposition
2015	Alasdair McDonnell	99,809	13.9	0.3	3 / 18	Steady	3rd	Opposition
2017	Colum Eastwood	95,419	11.7	0.3	0 / 18	▼3	3rd	Opposition
2019	Colum Eastwood	118,737	14.9	0.4	2 / 18	▲2	▲3rd	Opposition
2024	Colum Eastwood	86,861	11.1	0.3	2 / 18	Steady	3rd	Opposition

=== Local government elections ===
Election	Leader	1st pref. votes	%	Seats	+/−	Position
1973	Gerry Fitt	92,600	13.4	82 / 517	▲82	▲2nd
1977	Gerry Fitt	114,775	20.6	113 / 526	▲31	2nd
1981	John Hume	116,487	17.5	104 / 526	▼9	▼3rd
1985	John Hume	113,967	17.8	102 / 565	▼2	3rd
1989	John Hume	129,557	21.0	121 / 565	▲19	▲2nd
1993	John Hume	136,760	22.0	127 / 582	▲6	2nd
1997	John Hume	130,387	21.0	120 / 575	▼7	2nd
2001	John Hume	153,424	19.0	117 / 582	▼3	▼3rd
2005	Mark Durkan	121,991	17.4	101 / 582	▼16	▼4th
2011	Margaret Ritchie	99,325	15.0	87 / 583	▼14	4th
2014	Alasdair McDonnell	85,237	13.6	66 / 462	▼21	4th
2019	Colum Eastwood	81,419	12.0	59 / 462	▼7	4th
2023	Colum Eastwood	64,996	8.7	39 / 462	▼20	▼5th

=== European Parliament elections ===
Election	Leader	1st pref. votes	%	Seats	+/−	Position
1979	Gerry Fitt	140,622	25.5	1 / 3	▲1	▲2nd
1984	John Hume	151,399	22.1	1 / 3	Steady	2nd
1989	John Hume	136,335	25.0	1 / 3	Steady	2nd
1994	John Hume	161,992	28.9	1 / 3	Steady	2nd
1999	John Hume	190,731	28.1	1 / 3	Steady	2nd
2004	Mark Durkan	87,559	15.9	0 / 3	▼1	▼4th
2009	Mark Durkan	78,489	16.1	0 / 3	Steady	4th
2014	Alasdair McDonnell	81,594	13.0	0 / 3	Steady	4th
2019	Colum Eastwood	78,589	13.7	0 / 3	Steady	4th

== See also ==
- Demography and politics of Northern Ireland
- Labour Party in Northern Ireland
