= Alasdair McDonnell =

Northern Irish politician (born 1949)

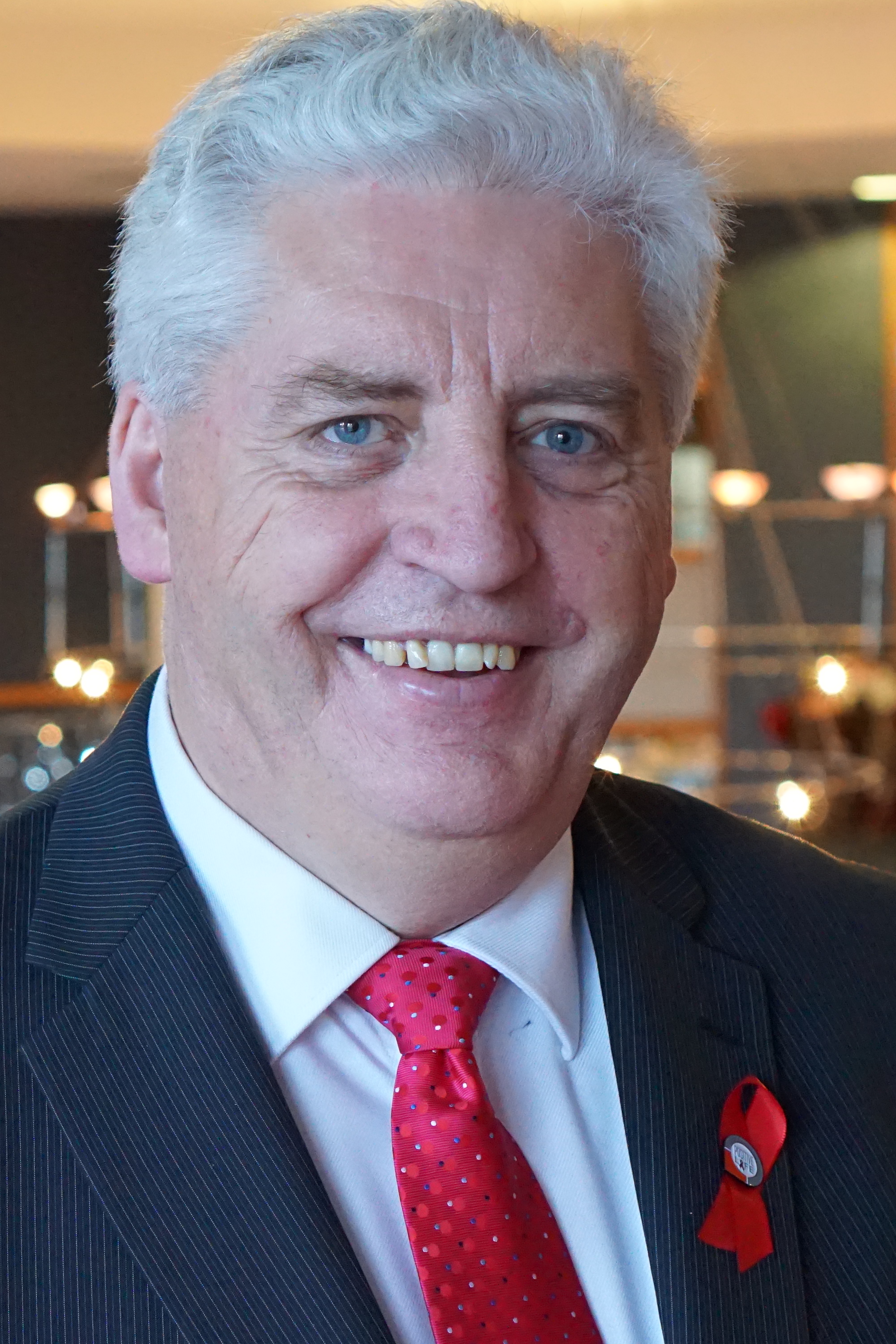
- McDonnell in 2014

Leader of the Social Democratic and Labour Party
- In office 5 November 2011 – 14 November 2015
- Deputy: Dolores Kelly
- Preceded by: Margaret Ritchie
- Succeeded by: Colum Eastwood

Deputy Leader of the Social Democratic and Labour Party
- In office 2004–2010
- Leader: Mark Durkan
- Preceded by: Bríd Rodgers
- Succeeded by: Patsy McGlone

Member of Parliament for Belfast South
- In office 5 May 2005 – 3 May 2017
- Preceded by: Martin Smyth
- Succeeded by: Emma Little-Pengelly

Member of the Legislative Assembly for Belfast South
- In office 25 June 1998 – 21 June 2015
- Preceded by: Constituency established
- Succeeded by: Claire Hanna

Member of Belfast City Council
- In office 15 May 1985 – 7 June 2001
- Preceded by: New district
- Succeeded by: Patrick McCarthy
- Constituency: Laganbank
- In office 18 May 1977 – 21 May 1981
- Preceded by: Thomas Gildea
- Succeeded by: Sammy Wilson
- Constituency: Belfast Area A

Northern Ireland Forum Member for Belfast South
- In office 30 May 1996 – 25 April 1998
- Preceded by: New forum
- Succeeded by: Forum dissolved

Personal details
- Born: 1 September 1949 (age 77) Cushendall, County Antrim, Northern Ireland
- Party: Social Democratic and Labour Party
- Spouse: Olivia Nugent
- Children: 4
- Education: University College Dublin

Alasdair McDonnell (born 1 September 1949) is a retired Irish nationalist politician in Northern Ireland who was leader of the Social Democratic and Labour Party (SDLP) from 2011 to 2015, having served as deputy leader between 2004 and 2010. He was the Member of Parliament for Belfast South from 2005 to 2017, and also a Member of the Legislative Assembly (MLA) for Belfast South from 1998 to 2015.

== Education and medical career ==
McDonnell was educated at St MacNissi’s College in the Glens of Antrim and graduated from medical school at University College Dublin in 1974. He then took a number of junior hospital medical posts before becoming a general practitioner in 1979. He retired from medicine in 2009.

== Political career ==
McDonnell's first involvement with politics came when he joined the National Democrats and stood as the party candidate in the 1970 election in North Antrim and lost to Ian Paisley.

McDonnell first won election to Belfast City Council in 1977, representing Belfast "Area A" which included the Short Strand and Upper Ormeau areas. He lost his council seat in a surprise result in 1981 but returned in 1985 and served as the first Catholic Deputy Lord Mayor of Belfast in 1995–96.

He first stood for the Westminster constituency of South Belfast in the 1979 general election and subsequently contested the constituency at each subsequent general election, though not in the 1986 by-election (caused by the resignation of Unionist MPs in protest at the Anglo Irish Agreement). He was also elected from the constituency to the Northern Ireland Peace Forum in 1996 and the Northern Ireland Assembly in 1998 and 2003.

In 2004 he became his party's deputy leader. In the 2005 general election McDonnell generated one of the most sensational results in Northern Ireland when he won South Belfast, primarily due to a split in the unionist vote. He received 10,339 votes while the Democratic Unionist Party (DUP) candidate Jimmy Spratt received 9,104 votes and Ulster Unionist Party candidate Michael McGimpsey received 7,263 votes. He was then re-elected by an increased majority in the 2010 general election. On 5 November 2011, he was elected leader of the SDLP at its conference in Belfast, succeeding Margaret Ritchie.

In a 2012 interview with The News Letter, McDonnell criticised Sinn Féin. He said the party was run along "Soviet style" lines where there was a military structure and where former terrorists were being placed into positions of power. He also claimed many people voting for Sinn Féin were doing so as an act of defiance.

As SDLP chief, McDonnell described the terms of the Sixth Periodic Review of Westminster constituencies, a seemingly blocked plan to reduce the number of MPs in the House of Commons by 50 (including two from Northern Ireland) to 600, as "a bureaucratic numbers game initiated by the Tories for purely party political advantage".

In June 2013, the SDLP abstained during the vote on the Civil Service (Special Advisers) Bill in Stormont, ensuring its passing. This led to claims from Sinn Féin that the SDLP was endorsing a "hierarchy of victims"' agenda and abandoning the principles of the Good Friday Agreement.

Despite the reported claims from Sinn Féin that it was inevitable that someone would mount a legal challenge to "what republicans view as a discriminatory law" no such challenge has since emerged. In the 2015 United Kingdom general election he stood again in Belfast South and was returned on 24.5% of the vote, the lowest ever vote share recorded by a successful MP in any part of the UK.

On 14 November 2015, McDonnell lost the leadership contest held at the SDLP's annual conference. His successor as leader of the party, Colum Eastwood, won with 172 votes to the 133 that McDonnell received.

On 8 June 2017, McDonnell lost his South Belfast seat to Emma Little-Pengelly (DUP) in the 2017 general election, despite increasing his vote from 2015.

Civic offices
Preceded by Ian Adamson	Deputy Lord Mayor of Belfast; 1995–1996	Succeeded by Margaret Crooks
Northern Ireland Forum
New forum	Member of the Northern Ireland Forum; South Belfast; 1996–1998	Forum dissolved
Northern Ireland Assembly
New assembly	Member of the Legislative Assembly for Belfast South; 1998–2015	Succeeded by Claire Hanna
Parliament of the United Kingdom
Preceded by Martin Smyth	Member of Parliament for Belfast South; 2005–2017	Succeeded by Emma Little-Pengelly
Party political offices
Preceded by Margaret Ritchie	Leader of the Social Democratic and Labour Party; 2011–2015	Succeeded by Colum Eastwood
