= Castle (District Electoral Area) =

District Electoral Area in Belfast, Northern Ireland

- Belfast City Council DEA constituency
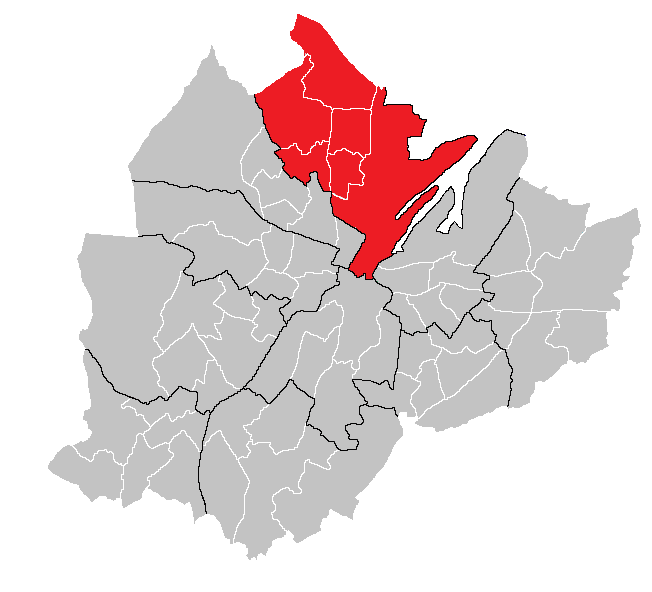
- Castle DEA marked on a map of Belfast City Council and its wards

Current constituency
- Created: 2014
- Seats: 6 (2014–)
- Councillors: Brónach Anglin (SF); Fred Cobain (DUP); Dean McCullough (DUP); Luke Meenehan (SF); Sam Nelson (APNI); Carl Whyte (SDLP)

Castle DEA (1993–2014) within Belfast

Castle is one of the ten district electoral areas in Belfast, Northern Ireland. Located in the north of the city, the district elects six members to Belfast City Council and contains the wards of Bellevue, Cavehill, Chichester Park, Duncairn, Fortwilliam and Innisfayle. Castle, along with Oldpark district and parts of the Court district and Newtownabbey Borough Council, forms the Belfast North constituency for the Northern Ireland Assembly and UK Parliament. The district is bounded to the east by the Victoria Channel, to the north by Newtownabbey Borough Council and Belfast Lough, to the south by North Street and to the west by the Cavehill Road.

The district takes its name from the current Belfast Castle, which is located on Cave Hill in the north of the district, while the southern section of the district is part of the city centre and forms one of Belfast's main cultural areas, known as the Cathedral Quarter. The east of the area also contains the Port of Belfast. Castle is served by the M2 and M5 motorways and the Yorkgate railway station.

Castle is one of the most mixed areas in the city, with just over half of the district's population being Protestant at the 2001 Census, a figure which had dropped to 35% by the 2021 Census. There are a number of peace lines in the district, for example along the Whitewell Road.

== History ==
Castle was created for the 1985 local elections. All six wards came from the former Area H, with only the Cliftonville ward and northern section of the Waterworks ward omitted from the new district. One of the district's six wards, Castleview, was renamed Innisfayle in 2014.

== Amenities ==
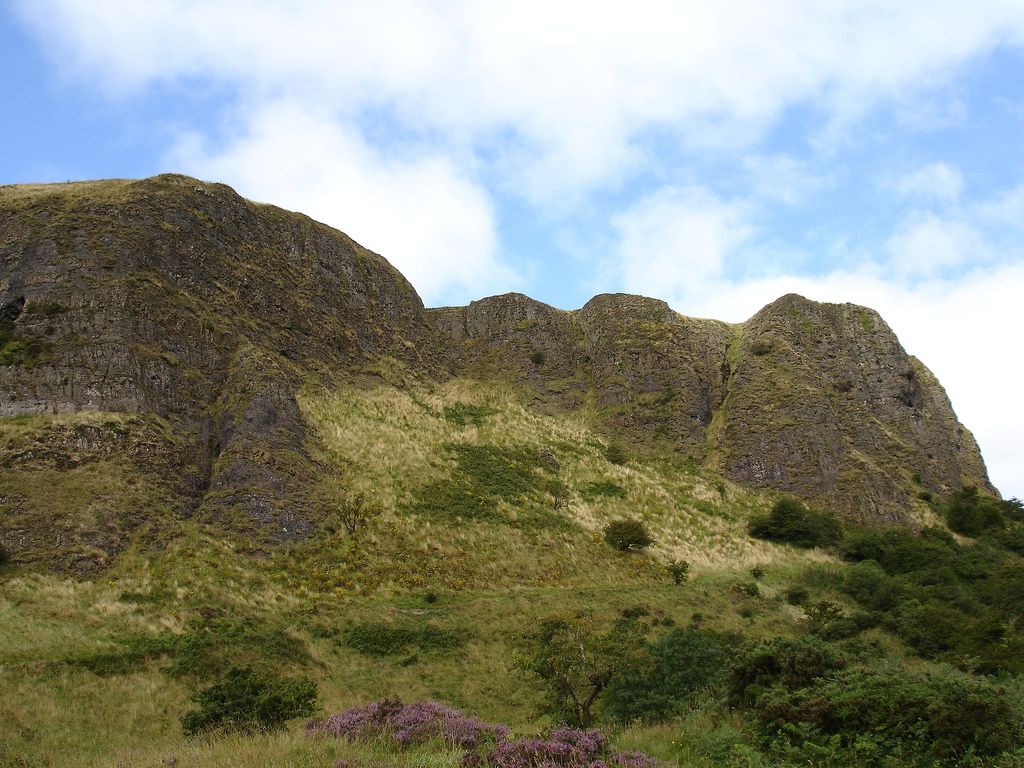
Cavehill

- Albert Memorial Clock
- Belfast Castle
- Belfast Exposed photographic gallery
- Belfast Harbour
- Belfast Hebrew Congregation
- Belfast Zoo
- Cavehill
- Dividers Sculpture
- Giant's Park
- McHugh's Bar
- Merchant Hotel
- The Northern Whig Bar
- NvTv (Northern Visions Television)
- Obel Tower
- St Anne’s Cathedral (Church of Ireland)
- The Big Fish, sculpture

Sport

- Seaview, Crusaders F.C. home ground
- Skegoneill Avenue, Brantwood F.C. home ground

Education

- Castle High School
- Dominican College
- Hazelwood College
- Seaview Primary School
- St Patrick's College
- University of Ulster, Belfast Campus

== Wards ==
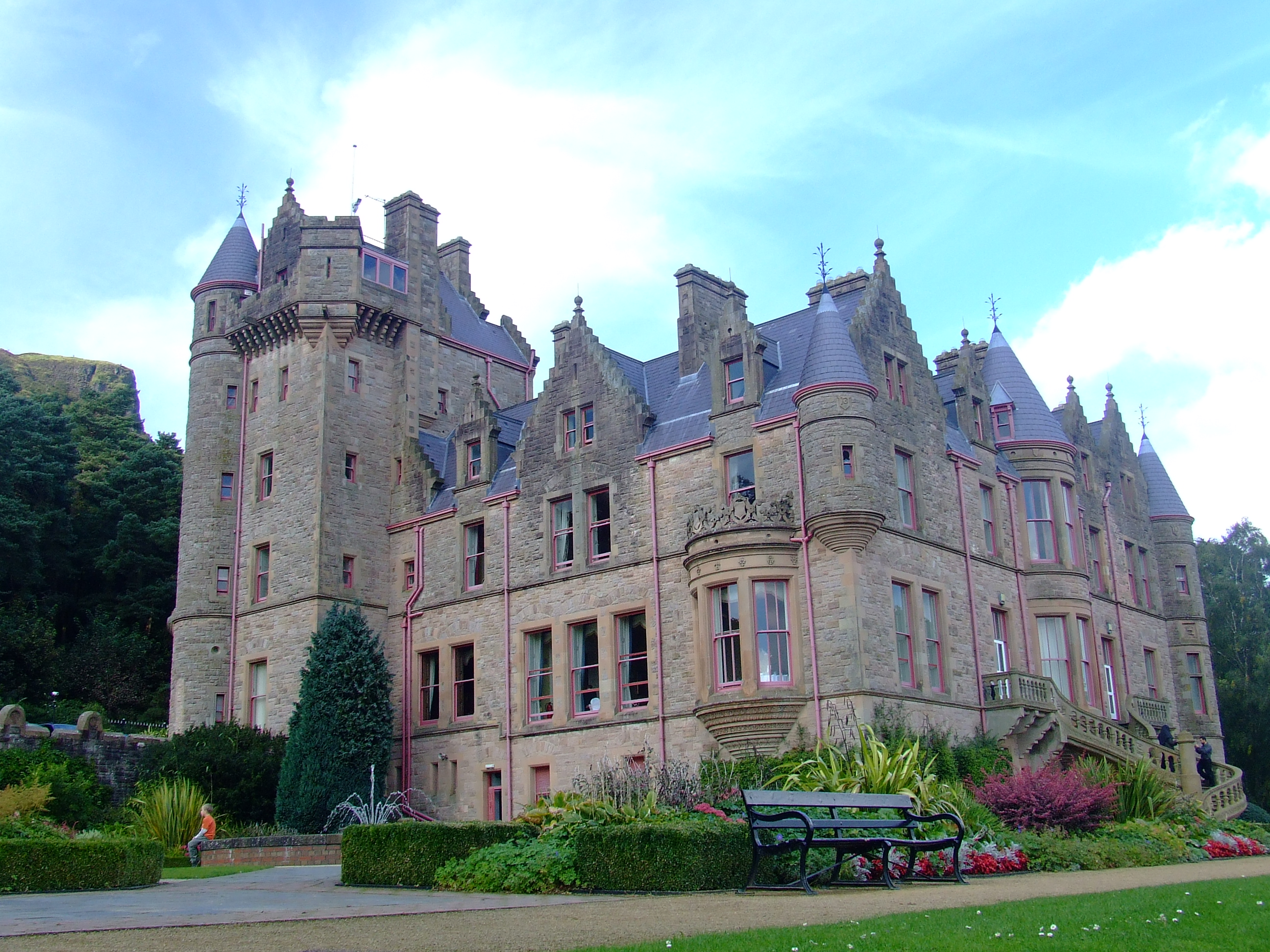
Belfast Castle

Map	Ward	Population (2011 Census)	Catholic	Protestant	Other	No Religion	Area	Density	NI Assembly	UK Parliament	Ref
1	Bellevue	4,910	63.7%	29.3%	1.1%	6%	2.96 km^{2}	1,659/km^{2}	Belfast North	Belfast North	
2	Castleview	4,722	38.1%	54.2%	1.2%	6.5%	1.41 km^{2}	3,349/km^{2}	Belfast North	Belfast North	
3	Cavehill	4,820	57.1%	37.7%	0.9%	4.3%	3.41 km^{2}	1,413/km^{2}	Belfast North	Belfast North	
4	Chichester Park	5,452	74.3%	17.2%	1.6%	6.9%	0.95 km^{2}	5,739/km^{2}	Belfast North	Belfast North	
5	Duncairn	4,901	23.6%	63.9%	2.2%	10.3	9.24 km^{2}	530/km^{2}	Belfast North	Belfast North	
6	Fortwilliam	4,561	41.3%	50.3%	1.2%	7.2%	1.03 km^{2}	4,428/km^{2}	Belfast North	Belfast North	
Castle		29,366	50.3%	41.5%	1.4%	6.9%	19 km^{2}	1,546/km^{2}			

== Councillors ==
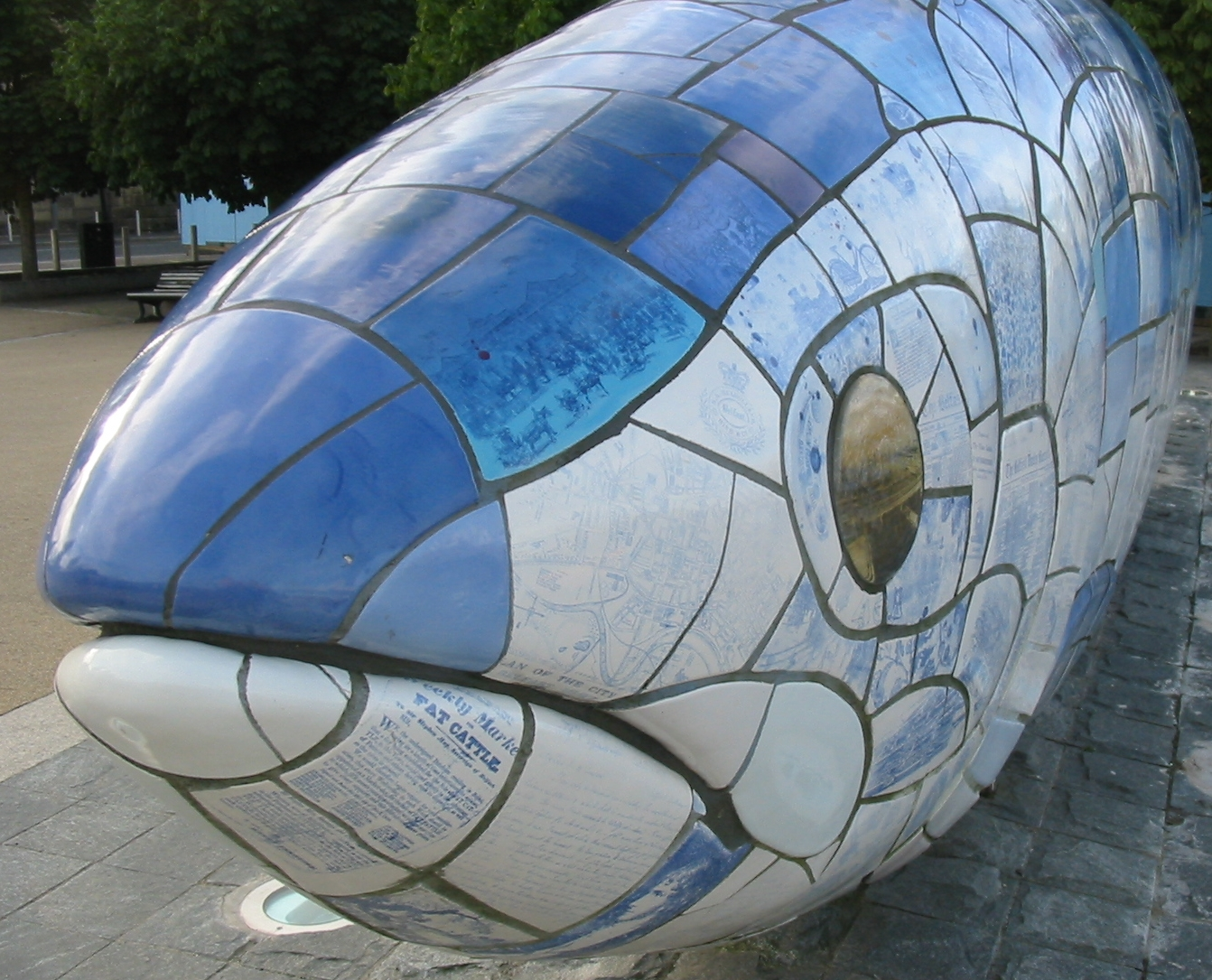
The Big Fish sculpture

Election	Councillor (Party)	Councillor (Party)	Councillor (Party)	Councillor (Party)	Councillor (Party)	Councillor (Party)
September 2025 Co-Option	Fred Cobain (DUP)	Dean McCullough (DUP)	Brónach Anglin (Sinn Féin)	Sam Nelson (Alliance)	Carl Whyte (SDLP)	Luke Meenehan (Sinn Féin)
2023	Fred Cobain (DUP)	Dean McCullough (DUP)	Brónach Anglin (Sinn Féin)	Sam Nelson (Alliance)	Carl Whyte (SDLP)	Conor Maskey (Sinn Féin)
May 2022 Co-Option	Fred Cobain (DUP)	Dean McCullough (DUP)	Mal O'Hara (Green Party)	Sam Nelson (Alliance)	Carl Whyte (SDLP)	Conor Maskey (Sinn Féin)
April 2020 Co-Option	Fred Cobain (DUP)	Dean McCullough (DUP)	Mal O'Hara (Green Party)	Nuala McAllister (Alliance)	Carl Whyte (SDLP)	Conor Maskey (Sinn Féin)
January 2020 Co-Option	Fred Cobain (DUP)	Guy Spence (DUP)	Mal O'Hara (Green Party)	Nuala McAllister (Alliance)	Carl Whyte (SDLP)	Conor Maskey (Sinn Féin)
2019	Fred Cobain (DUP)	Guy Spence (DUP)	Mal O'Hara (Green Party)	Nuala McAllister (Alliance)	Carl Whyte (SDLP)	John Finucane (Sinn Féin)
July 2017 Defection	Lydia Patterson (DUP)	Guy Spence (DUP)	David Browne (UUP)	Nuala McAllister (Alliance)	Pat Convery (SDLP)/ (Independent)	Mary Ellen Campbell (Sinn Féin)
2014	Lydia Patterson (DUP)	Guy Spence (DUP)	David Browne (UUP)	Nuala McAllister (Alliance)	Pat Convery (SDLP)/ (Independent)	Mary Ellen Campbell (Sinn Féin)
2011	Lydia Patterson (DUP)	Guy Spence (DUP)	David Browne (UUP)	Tierna Cunningham (Sinn Féin)	Pat Convery (SDLP)/ (Independent)	Mary Ellen Campbell (Sinn Féin)
2005	Nigel Dodds (DUP)	Ian Crozier (DUP)	David Browne (UUP)	Tierna Cunningham (Sinn Féin)	Pat Convery (SDLP)/ (Independent)	Cathal Mallaghan (SDLP)
2001	Nigel Dodds (DUP)	Ian Crozier (DUP)	David Browne (UUP)	Danny Lavery (Sinn Féin)	Pat Convery (SDLP)/ (Independent)	Alban Maginness (SDLP)
1997	Nigel Dodds (DUP)	Nelson McCausland (UUP)/ (Independent Unionist)	David Browne (UUP)	Danny Lavery (Sinn Féin)	Tom Campbell (Alliance)	Alban Maginness (SDLP)
1993	Nigel Dodds (DUP)	Nelson McCausland (UUP)/ (Independent Unionist)	David Browne (UUP)	Jonathan Stevenson (SDLP)	John Carson (UUP)	Alban Maginness (SDLP)
1989	Nigel Dodds (DUP)	Nelson McCausland (UUP)/ (Independent Unionist)	Frank Millar (Independent Unionist)	Tom Campbell (Alliance)	John Carson (UUP)	Alban Maginness (SDLP)
1985	Nigel Dodds (DUP)	Alfred Redpath (UUP)	Frank Millar (Independent Unionist)	Tom Campbell (Alliance)	John Carson (UUP)	Alban Maginness (SDLP)

== 2023 Election ==
2019: 2 x DUP, 1 x Sinn Féin, 1 x Alliance, 1 x SDLP, 1 x Green

2023: 2 x Sinn Féin, 2 x DUP, 1 x Alliance, 1 x SDLP

2019–2023 Change: Sinn Féin gain from Green

Castle - 6 seats
Party	Candidate	FPv%	Count				
Party	Candidate	FPv%	1	2	3	4	5
Sinn Féin	Brónach Anglin	20.15%	2,479				
Sinn Féin	Conor Maskey* †	16.81%	2,068				
DUP	Fred Cobain*	14.43%	1,775				
DUP	Dean McCullough*	13.59%	1,671	1,673.31	1,673.85	2,021.85	
Alliance	Sam Nelson*	11.31%	1,392	1,546.11	1,590.03	1,772.03	
SDLP	Carl Whyte*	8.51%	1,047	1,378.98	1,511.28	1,608.53	1,628.53
Green (NI)	Mal O'Hara*	7.96%	979	1,137.73	1,225.75	1,474.88	1,553.88
UUP	Julie-Anne Corr-Johnston	4.50%	553	555.64	556.72		
People Before Profit	Barney Doherty	2.03%	250	300.16	327.16		
Workers' Party	Lily Kerr	0.70%	86	102.17	111.17		
Electorate: 23,442 Valid: 12,479 (53.23%) Spoilt: 179 Quota: 1,758 Turnout: 12,300 (52.47%)

== 2019 Election ==
2014: 2 x DUP, 1 x Sinn Féin, 1 x Alliance, 1 x SDLP, 1 x UUP

2019: 2 x DUP, 1 x Sinn Féin, 1 x Alliance, 1 x SDLP, 1 x Green

2014-2019 Change: Green gain from UUP

Castle - 6 seats
Party	Candidate	FPv%	Count								
Party	Candidate	FPv%	1	2	3	4	5	6	7	8	9
Alliance	Nuala McAllister* †	15.81%	1,787								
Sinn Féin	John Finucane †	14.60%	1,650								
DUP	Fred Cobain	12.73%	1,439	1,440.35	1,440.35	1,443.34	1,446.44	1,458.44	1,460.53	1,939.53	
DUP	Guy Spence* †	12.45%	1,407	1,408.08	1,408.08	1,412.17	1,418.26	1,425.26	1,426.35	1,783.35	
Green (NI)	Mal O'Hara	7.80%	882	939.51	967.67	1,031.82	1,174.86	1,277.64	1,350.6	1,423.01	1,493.01
SDLP	Carl Whyte	5.76%	651	680.61	690.51	709.32	727.04	835.2	1,365.4	1,397.65	1,432.65
Sinn Féin	Mary Ellen Campbell*	9.76%	1,103	1,109.66	1,111.93	1,128.29	1,145.56	1,183.92	1,212.91	1,200	1,223
UUP	David Browne*	8.97%	1,014	1,022.46	1,024.64	1,027	1,033.27	1,042.72	1,049.35		
SDLP	Heather Wilson	4.87%	551	572.78	586.23	604.31	614.58	686.57			
Independent	Patrick Convery*	3.33%	377	384.47	398.19	406.46	426.18				
People Before Profit	Riley Johnston	1.80%	204	211.83	215.83	245.46					
Workers' Party	Gemma Weir	1.38%	159	166.92	171.32						
Independent	Cathal Mullaghan	0.67%	76	81.49							
Electorate: 22,262 Valid: 11,300 (50.76%) Spoilt: 136 Quota: 1,615 Turnout: 11,436 (51.37%)

== 2014 Election ==
2011: 2 x DUP, 2 x Sinn Féin, 1 x SDLP, 1 x UUP

2014: 2 x DUP, 1 x Sinn Féin, 1 x SDLP, 1 x UUP, 1 x Alliance

2014-2019 Change: Alliance gain from Sinn Féin

Castle - 6 seats
Party	Candidate	FPv%	Count						
Party	Candidate	FPv%	1	2	3	4	5	6	7
Sinn Féin	Mary Ellen Campbell*	15.31%	1,619						
SDLP	Patrick Convery* ‡	11.32%	1,197	1,206.6	1,229.66	1,335.9	1,756.9		
Alliance	Nuala McAllister	9.64%	1,020	1,021.8	1,064.86	1,261.1	1,388.58	1,410.58	1,549.18
DUP	Guy Spence*	12.66%	1,339	1,339.12	1,340.12	1,356.12	1,357.12	1,493.12	1,493.89
DUP	Lydia Patterson*	12.06%	1,276	1,276.18	1,277.18	1,287.18	1,295.18	1,463.18	1,467.03
UUP	David Browne*	10.71%	1,133	1,133.12	1,136.12	1,158.12	1,163.12	1,459.12	1,465.28
Sinn Féin	Tierna Cunningham*	9.81%	1,038	1,117.14	1,144.38	1,216.4	1,258.48	1,259.48	1,352.65
PUP	William McQuade	6.21%	657	657	659	673	677		
SDLP	Cathal Mullaghan	5.24%	554	555.98	596.98	651.28			
NI21	Alison Crawford	3.18%	336	337.08	343.08				
Independent	Fra Hughes	2.06%	218	219.02	245.02				
Workers' Party	Gemma Weir	1.81%	191	191.48					
Electorate: 20,977 Valid: 10,578 (50.43%) Spoilt: 175 Quota: 1,512 Turnout: 10,753 (51.26%)

== 2011 Election ==
2005: 2 x DUP, 2 x SDLP, 1 x Sinn Féin, 1 x UUP

2011: 2 x DUP, 2 x Sinn Féin, 1 x SDLP, 1 x UUP

2005-2011 Change: Sinn Féin gain from SDLP

Castle - 6 seats
Party	Candidate	FPv%	Count					
Party	Candidate	FPv%	1	2	3	4	5	6
DUP	Lydia Patterson	14.85%	1,489					
DUP	Guy Spence	9.44%	946	949	1,529			
Sinn Féin	Tierna Cunningham*	13.74%	1,377	1,404	1,404	1,433		
SDLP	Patrick Convery*	13.64%	1,367	1,399	1,404	1,606		
Sinn Féin	Mary Ellen Campbell	12.90%	1,293	1,310	1,310	1,326	1,335	1,335
UUP	David Browne*	11.78%	1,181	1,185	1,211	1,332	1,345	1,440.04
SDLP	Cathal Mullaghan*	8.81%	883	903	904	1,120	1,255	1,255.64
Alliance	David McKechnie	6.87%	689	726	732			
DUP	Lee Reynolds	6.27%	629	632				
Workers' Party	John Lavery	1.70%	170					
Electorate: 19,494 Valid: 10,024 (51.42%) Spoilt: 223 Quota: 1,433 Turnout: 10,247 (52.56%)

== 2005 Election ==
2001: 2 x DUP, 2 x SDLP, 1 x Sinn Féin, 1 x UUP

2005: 2 x DUP, 2 x SDLP, 1 x Sinn Féin, 1 x UUP

2001-2005 Change: No change

Castle - 6 seats
Party	Candidate	FPv%	Count						
Party	Candidate	FPv%	1	2	3	4	5	6	7
DUP	Nigel Dodds*	28.96%	3,161						
SDLP	Pat Convery*	16.66%	1,818						
UUP	David Browne*	10.52%	1,148	1,454.51	1,563.59				
SDLP	Cathal Mullaghan	10.41%	1,136	1,139.57	1,408.14	1,614.92			
DUP	Ian Crozier*	4.01%	438	1,390.68	1,408.23	1,408.65	2,010.65		
Sinn Féin	Tierna Cunningham	9.43%	1,029	1,032.06	1,066.06	1,087.34	1,109.25	1,133.25	1,163.17
Sinn Féin	David Kennedy	9.17%	1,001	1,003.04	1,032.55	1,046.41	1,068.4	1,090.4	1,111.4
DUP	Lydia Patterson	5.66%	618	908.7	918.74	919.16			
Alliance	Marjorie Hawkins	2.47%	270	279.69					
Green (NI)	Shane Ó Heorpa	1.68%	183	183.51					
Workers' Party	John Lavery	1.03%	112	117.61					
Electorate: 18,413 Valid: 10,914 (59.27%) Spoilt: 253 Quota: 1,560 Turnout: 11,167 (60.65%)

== 2001 Election ==
1997: 2 x UUP, 1 x DUP, 1 x SDLP, 1 x Alliance, 1 x Sinn Féin,

2001: 2 x DUP, 2 x SDLP, 1 x Sinn Féin, 1 x UUP

1997-2001 Change: DUP and SDLP gain from UUP and Alliance

Castle - 6 seats
Party	Candidate	FPv%	Count							
Party	Candidate	FPv%	1	2	3	4	5	6	7	8
DUP	Nigel Dodds*	27.94%	3,949							
SDLP	Alban Maginness*	17.83%	2,520							
DUP	Ian Crozier	5.37%	759	2,142.12						
Sinn Féin	Danny Lavery*	14.09%	1,991	1,992.02	2,094.62					
UUP	David Browne*	10.97%	1,550	1,868.75	1,874.95	1,946.95	1,947.7	1,951.7	1,979.41	2,337.41
SDLP	Pat Convery	9.93%	1,403	1,407.08	1,698.88	1,699.13	1,749.68	1,775.83	1,786.83	1,911.93
Alliance	Tom Campbell*	6.96%	984	1,027.86	1,090.06	1,094.56	1,106.71	1,131.07	1,141.27	1,325.27
PUP	Janet Carson	2.49%	352	456.04	457.84	478.44	478.74	484.45	490.41	
NI Women's Coalition	Elizabeth Byrne McCullough	1.79%	253	259.12	277.32	279.12	284.67	300.38	308.63	
Independent	David Mahood	1.26%	178	218.8	220.2	229.05	229.05	230.15	236.71	
Independent	Alexander Blair	0.77%	109	115.63	116.03	117.78	117.78	118.83		
Workers' Party	Marcella Delaney	0.59%	84	87.57	91.37	91.62	94.02			
Electorate: 21,068 Valid: 14,132 (67.08%) Spoilt: 365 Quota: 2,019 Turnout: 14,497 (68.81%)

== 1997 Election ==
1993: 2 x UUP, 2 SDLP, 1 x DUP, 1 x Independent Unionist

1997: 2 x UUP, 1 x DUP, 1 x SDLP, 1 x Alliance, 1 x Sinn Féin

1993-1997 Change: Alliance and Sinn Féin gain from UUP and SDLP, Independent Unionist joins UUP

Castle - 6 seats
Party	Candidate	FPv%	Count							
Party	Candidate	FPv%	1	2	3	4	5	6	7	8
DUP	Nigel Dodds*	17.41%	2,081							
SDLP	Alban Maginness*	14.90%	1,781							
Alliance	Tom Campbell	11.86%	1,417	1,420.06	1,423.46	1,518.18	1,527.68	1,917.68		
Sinn Féin	Danny Lavery	11.40%	1,362	1,362.18	1,368.38	1,397.74	1,397.92	1,616.08	1,619.28	1,715.28
UUP	David Browne*	9.49%	1,134	1,169.1	1,169.18	1,192.54	1,300.26	1,301.62	1,633.3	1,638.3
UUP	Nelson McCausland*	8.91%	1,065	1,114.86	1,114.9	1,124.26	1,253.26	1,256.62	1,456.04	1,462.04
UUP	John Carson*	8.58%	1,025	1,060.28	1,060.52	1,073.52	1,169.38	1,192.62	1,390.04	1,430.04
PUP	Jim Crothers	6.51%	778	797.8	797.8	821.2	911.18	920.46		
SDLP	Jonathan Stevenson*	6.02%	720	720	777.92	832.48	832.48			
DUP	Robert Ferris	0.71%	85	304.96	304.96	309.14				
Ulster Democratic	Raymond Gilliland	1.81%	216	220.14	220.14	224.32				
NI Women's Coalition	Eileen Calder	1.25%	149	150.08	151.12					
Green (NI)	Alan Warren	0.61%	73	73	73.24					
Workers' Party	Paul Treanor	0.44%	53	53.18	53.9					
Ulster Independence	Norman McClelland	0.01%	8	8.18	8.18					
Natural Law	Andrea Gribben	0.01%	5	5	5.04					
Electorate: 21,949 Valid: 11,952 (54.45%) Spoilt: 288 Quota: 1,708 Turnout: 12,240 (55.77%)

== 1993 Election ==
1989: 2 x Independent Unionist, 1 x UUP, 1 SDLP, 1 x DUP, 1 x Alliance

1993: 2 x UUP, 2 SDLP, 1 x DUP, 1 x Independent Unionist

1989-1993 Change: UUP and SDLP gain from Independent Unionist and Alliance

Castle - 6 seats
Party	Candidate	FPv%	Count								
Party	Candidate	FPv%	1	2	3	4	5	6	7	8	9
DUP	Nigel Dodds*	20.61%	2,470								
UUP	David Browne	15.27%	1,830								
UUP	John Carson*	12.98%	1,556	1,862.24							
Ind. Unionist	Nelson McCausland*	8.93%	1,070	1,475.76	1,604.58	1,608.9	1,696.61	1,801.61			
SDLP	Alban Maginness*	13.26%	1,589	1,589.96	1,589.96	1,617.96	1,618.31	1,626.38	2,010.38		
SDLP	Jonathan Stevenson	9.09%	1,090	1,090	1,090	1,100	1,100.21	1,101.21	1,296.2	1,565.9	1,566.9
Alliance	Tom Campbell*	9.78%	1,172	1,185.44	1,194.75	1,225.75	1,234.15	1,311.09	1,465.04	1,490.15	1,550.15
Sinn Féin	Gerard McGuigan	4.80%	575	575.64	575.64	578.64	578.92	579.31			
Green (NI)	Alan Warren	2.09%	251	255.8	257.51	303.83	306.7	337.1			
NI Conservatives	Margaret Redpath	2.05%	246	269.36	274.49	274.49	281.63				
Workers' Party	Paul Treanor	1.13%	136	137.28	137.66						
Electorate: 22,839 Valid: 11,985 (52.48%) Spoilt: 346 Quota: 1,713 Turnout: 12,331 (53.99%)

== 1989 Election ==
1985: 2 x UUP, 1 SDLP, 1 x DUP, 1 x Alliance, 1 x Independent Unionist

1989: 2 x Independent Unionist, 1 x UUP, 1 SDLP, 1 x DUP, 1 x Alliance

1985-1989 Change: Independent Unionist gain from UUP

Castle - 6 seats
Party	Candidate	FPv%	Count							
Party	Candidate	FPv%	1	2	3	4	5	6	7	8
SDLP	Alban Maginness*	19.17%	2,301							
UUP	John Carson*	18.26%	2,192							
DUP	Nigel Dodds*	14.82%	1,779							
Alliance	Tom Campbell*	8.77%	1,053	1,384.02	1,405.36	1,405.63	1,488.77	1,493.04	1,591.75	1,855.75
Ind. Unionist	Frank Millar*	11.54%	1,385	1,386.62	1,455.7	1,460.44	1,475.44	1,559.34	1,561.16	1,618.15
Ind. Unionist	Nelson McCausland	9.69%	1,163	1,163	1,270.36	1,276.3	1,280.1	1,390.64	1,392.76	1,433.56
UUP	Alfred Redpath*	6.39%	767	771.05	993.25	996.76	1,003.74	1,053.35	1,061.95	1,118.56
Workers' Party	Anthony Kerr	4.13%	496	612.37	619.85	620.24	714.69	724.37	864.13	
Sinn Féin	Bobby Lavery*	3.77%	453	510.78	511.22	511.43	527.37	527.37		
DUP	Samuel Lowry	1.80%	216	216.27	254.11	291.13	294.13			
Green (NI)	Maria O'Sullivan	0.79%	95	139.28	140.16	140.19				
Labour '87	Thomas Galloway	0.86%	103	124.87	127.95	128.04				
Electorate: 24,488 Valid: 12,003 (49.02%) Spoilt: 323 Quota: 1,715 Turnout: 12,326 (50.33%)

== 1985 Election ==
1985: 2 x UUP, 1 x SDLP, 1 x DUP, 1 x Alliance, 1 x Independent Unionist

Castle - 6 seats
Party	Candidate	FPv%	Count							
Party	Candidate	FPv%	1	2	3	4	5	6	7	8
UUP	John Carson*	24.23%	3,153							
SDLP	Alban Maginness	15.19%	1,977							
Ind. Unionist	Frank Millar*	12.47%	1,623	1,812.83	1,813.08	1,836.49	1,863.28			
DUP	Nigel Dodds	11.54%	1,502	1,622.95	1,623	1,625.05	1,632.51	2,179.51		
UUP	Alfred Redpath	8.51%	1,107	1,783.5	1,783.5	1,797.73	1,821.83	1,916.83		
Alliance	Tom Campbell	6.14%	799	822.37	825.42	919.79	1,333.54	1,337.77	1,351.99	1,870.99
Ind. Unionist	William Gault*	5.18%	674	892.94	893.04	903.86	915.55	980.31	1,280.51	1,281.51
SDLP	John Murphy	4.45%	579	581.87	672.17	864.67	885.52	885.52	887.89	
DUP	Michael Whittley	5.43%	706	726.5	726.5	733.5	739.32			
Alliance	Robert Jamison	3.45%	449	474.42	475.87	530.04				
Workers' Party	Katherine Johnston	3.41%	444	448.51	451.06					
Electorate: 24,488 Valid: 12,003 (49.02%) Spoilt: 323 Quota: 1,715 Turnout: 12,326 (50.33%)

== See also ==
- Belfast City Council
- Electoral wards of Belfast
- Local government in Northern Ireland
- Members of Belfast City Council
