= John Finucane =

Northern Irish politician (born 1980)

John Finucane MP
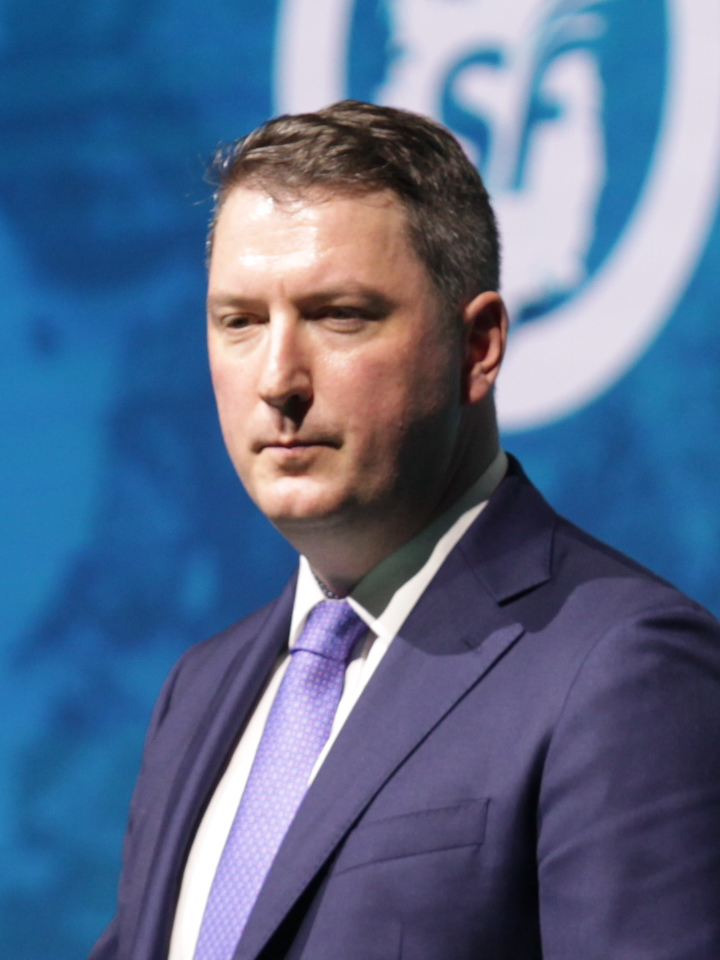
- Finucane in 2022

Member of Parliament for Belfast North
- Incumbent
- Assumed office 12 December 2019
- Preceded by: Nigel Dodds
- Majority: 5,612 (13.9%)

76th Lord Mayor of Belfast
- In office 1 June 2019 – 18 December 2019
- Deputy: Peter McReynolds
- Preceded by: Deirdre Hargey
- Succeeded by: Daniel Baker

Member of Belfast City Council for Castle
- In office 7 May 2019 – 13 December 2019
- Preceded by: Mary Campbell
- Succeeded by: Conor Maskey

Personal details
- Born: 1980 (age 45–46) Belfast, Northern Ireland
- Party: Sinn Féin
- Children: 4
- Parent: Pat Finucane (father)
- Education: St Malachy's College
- Occupation: Politician

John Finucane (born 1980) is an Irish Sinn Féin politician and solicitor. He has been Member of Parliament (MP) for Belfast North since the 2019 general election. He has never taken his seat in Westminster, due to his party's longstanding policy of abstentionism.

== Early life ==
Finucane is the son of the Irish lawyer Pat Finucane, who was murdered in front of him in 1989 at their family home by loyalist paramilitaries, a murder that BBC News called "one of the most controversial killings during The Troubles". Finucane's father was a Roman Catholic from west Belfast, whilst his mother came from a Protestant family in east Belfast. Several of Finucane's close relatives on his father's side were members of the Irish Republican Army.

Finucane attended the University of Dundee between 1998 and 2002. When asked why he chose Dundee, he said: "I didn't apply to any universities here; I think I wanted away from the North. Dundee was the obvious choice because, at that time, it was the only university that offered English and Northern Irish law, whereas the others only offered Scottish law."

== Political career ==
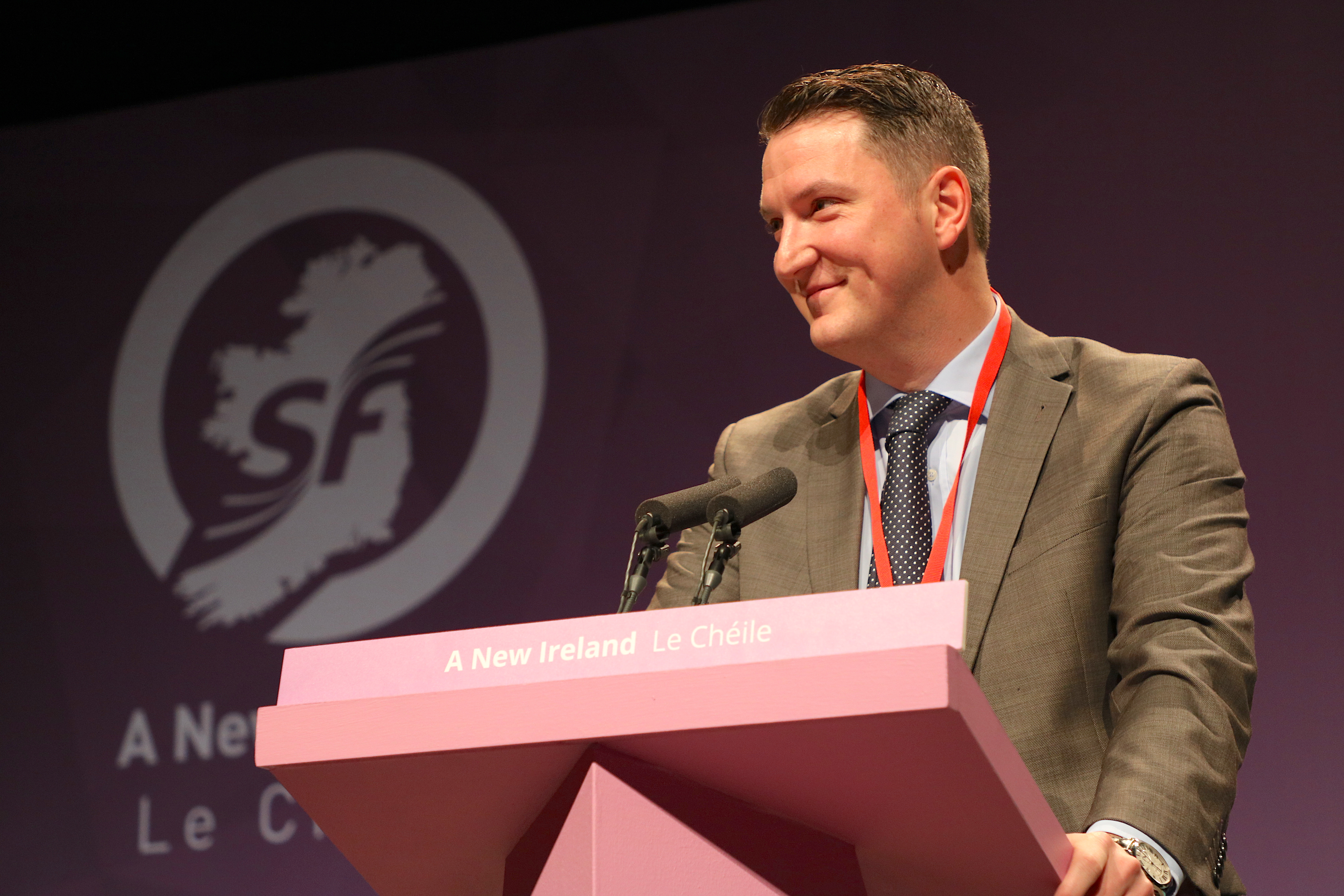
Finucane in 2017

At the 2017 United Kingdom general election Finucane contested the Belfast North parliamentary constituency for Sinn Féin; the sitting MP was Nigel Dodds of the Democratic Unionist Party. Finucane secured Sinn Féin's highest vote share ever in the constituency but failed to unseat Dodds.

In 2019, Finucane ran for Belfast City Council in the Castle constituency. Also on the ballot were his former St Malachy's College classmates Mal O'Hara of the Green Party and Carl Whyte of the SDLP. Finucane won 1,650 votes, placing him second in the poll behind Nuala McAllister of the Alliance Party. He was consequently elected as a councillor.

Finucane was elected as Lord Mayor of Belfast in May 2019. Shortly after being elected Lord Mayor at Belfast City Hall, he was informed by the Police Service of Northern Ireland that loyalists had made credible threats to his life and planned to attack his family home. Finucane remarked "I am committed to serving and representing all the people of this city and I will not be deterred from that by threats from anyone." The next day, he welcomed Charles, Prince of Wales to the city whilst he was on an official visit.

At the 2019 United Kingdom general election Finucane again contested Belfast North, winning the seat with 23,078 votes to Dodds's 21,135. He is the first Irish nationalist MP in the history of the constituency.

When Sky News revealed Westminster Accounts in January 2023, Finucane was shown to be the highest-earning Northern Irish MP exclusive of Westminster pay (which Finucane does not take due to his party's non-attendance at Westminster). Most of his secondary earnings came from his work as a solicitor with Belfast law firm Finucane Toner.

In the 2024 United Kingdom general election, Finucane was re-elected with an increased majority.

== Personal life ==
Finucane is goalkeeper and captain of GAA's Lámh Dhearg GAC. He has four children.

Parliament of the United Kingdom
Preceded by Nigel Dodds	Member of Parliament for Belfast North; 2019–present	Incumbent
Civic offices
Preceded by Deirdre Hargey	Lord Mayor of Belfast; 2019	Succeeded by Daniel Baker
