= List of mayors of Belfast =

Lord Mayor of Belfast
- Ardmhéara Bhéal Feirste (Irish); Laird Mayor o Bilfawst (Ulster Scots)
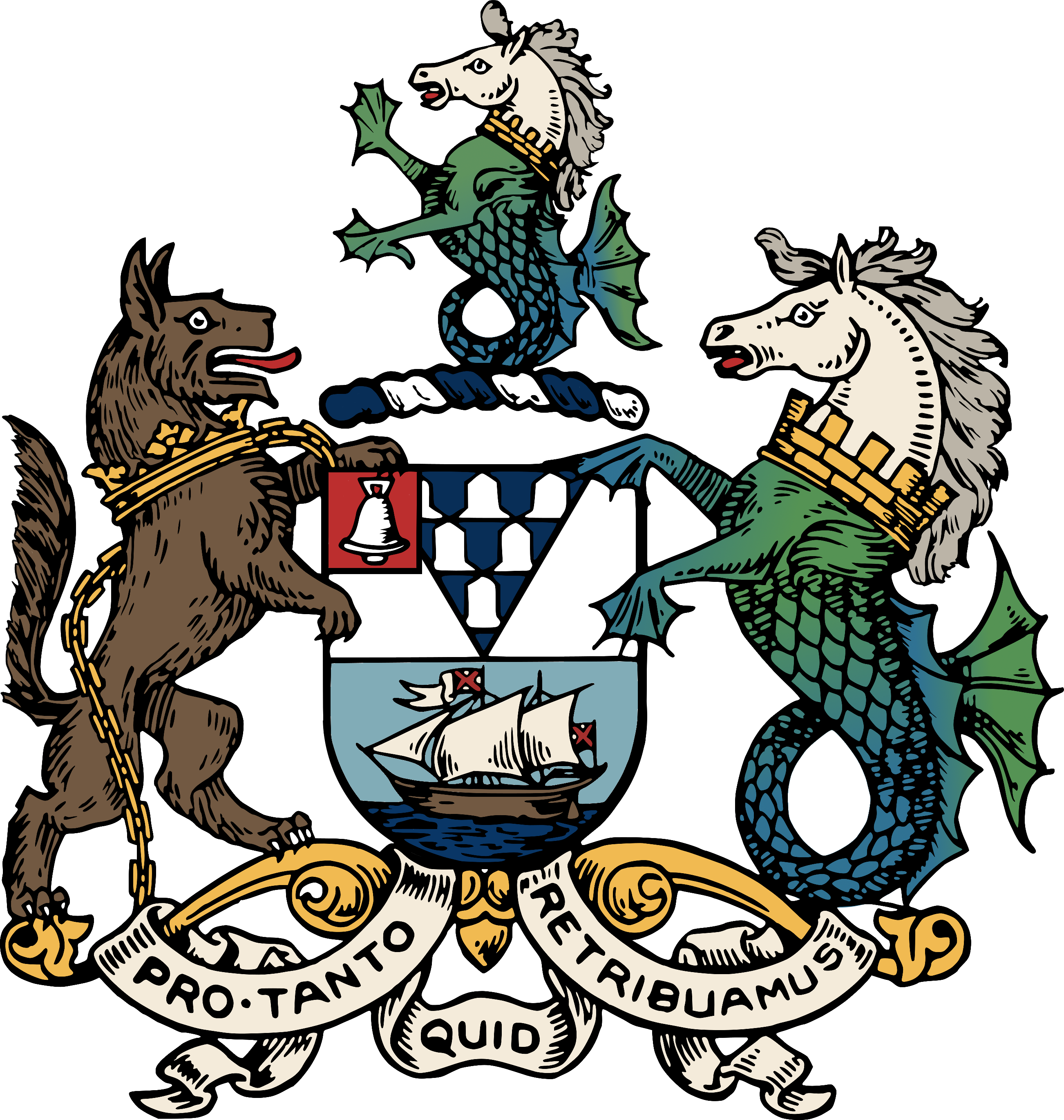
- Coat of arms of Belfast

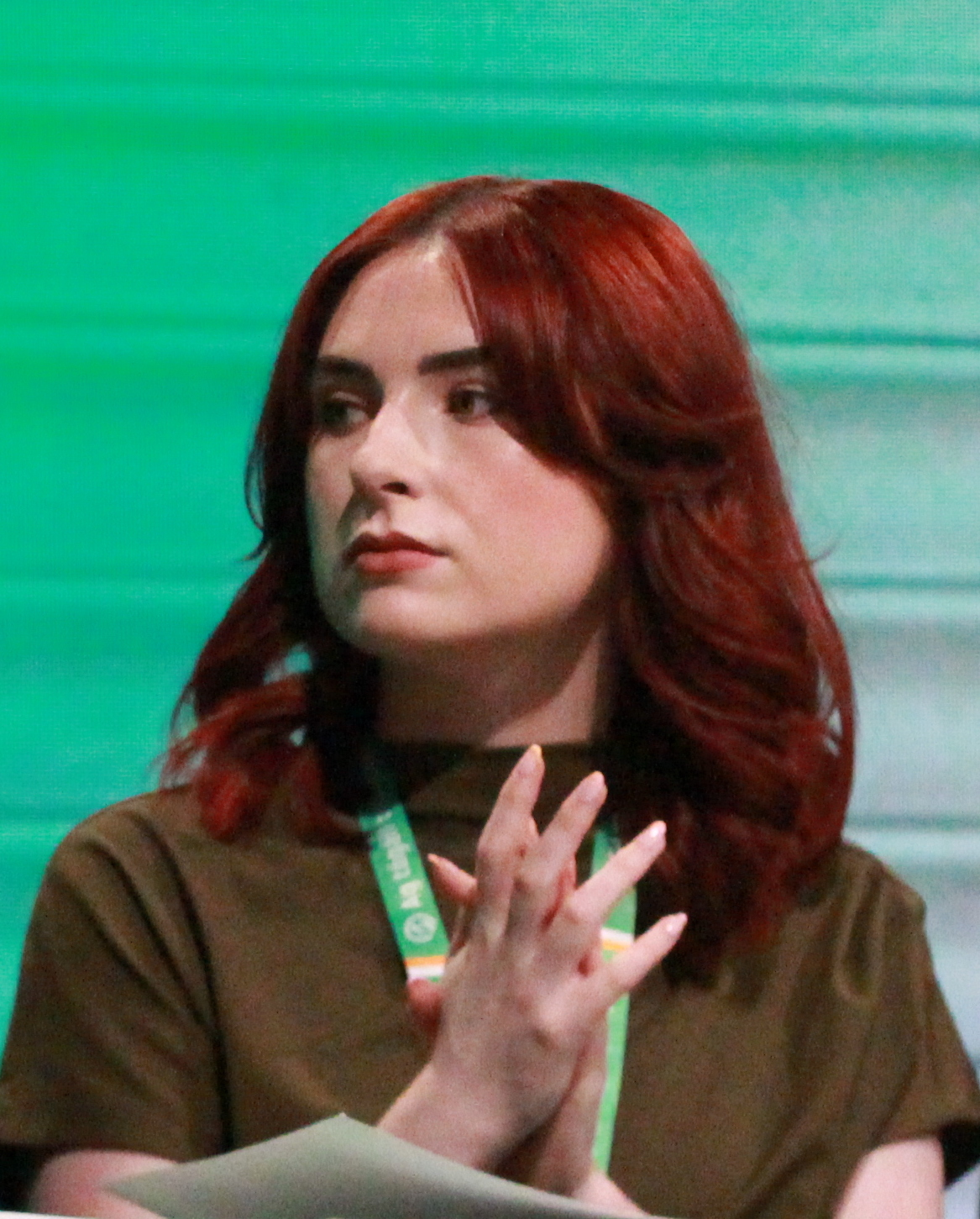
- Incumbent; Róis-Máire Donnelly since 1 June 2026
- Style: The Right Honourable
- Appointer: Belfast City Council
- Term length: One year
- Inaugural holder: Sir Daniel Dixon (Lord Mayor); George Dunbar (Mayor); John Vesey (Sovereign)
- Formation: 1892 (as Lord Mayor of Belfast); 1842 (as Mayor of Belfast); 1613 (as Sovereign of Belfast)
- Deputy: Hedley Abernethy
- Website: Official website

The Lord Mayor of Belfast is the leader and chairperson of Belfast City Council, elected annually from and by the city's 60 councillors. The lord mayor also serves as the representative of the city of Belfast, welcoming guests from across the United Kingdom and Ireland.

The current lord mayor is Róis-Máire Donnelly of Sinn Féin who has been in the position of lord mayor since 1 June 2026. The Deputy Lord Mayor is Hedley Abernethy of the Alliance Party

== History ==
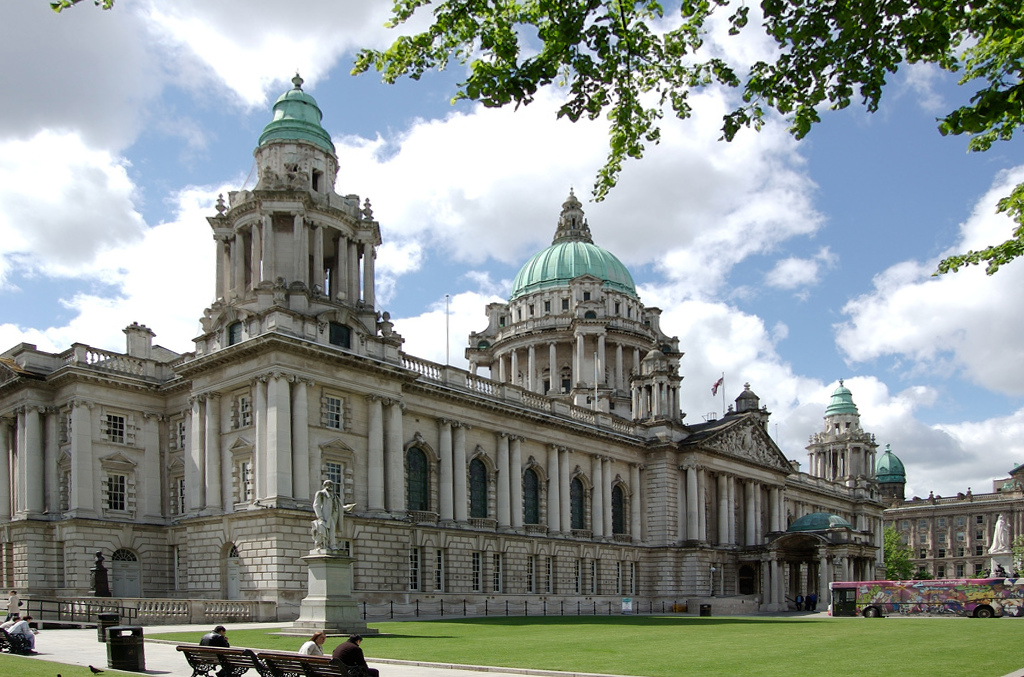
The lord mayor's parlour is traditionally situated in Belfast City Hall

The position that is now the lord mayor originated in 1613 in the town's Royal Charter as the sovereign of Belfast. In 1842, this position was restyled the mayor of Belfast. In 1892, four years after Belfast was granted city status, the position was given lord mayor status, making it one of only three cities on the island of Ireland having a lord mayor, the other two being Cork and Dublin. In 1929, it became one of only six cities in the United Kingdom to have a lord mayor styled "the Right Honourable". Until 1973 the position was held for three years, when it was reduced to its current term of one year. From 1921 until 1972, the lord mayor was automatically entitled to a seat in the Senate of Northern Ireland. Until the mid 1990s, the lord mayor would have the option for a set of ornamental streetlights installed on their street for the duration of their term, which would then be moved to their successor's street. They were entitled to decline this and the streetlights are now permanently installed outside Ulster Hall.

For most of the city's modern history, the position has been held by Unionists, with members of the Ulster Unionist Party holding the post for a total of 61 of the 67 years between 1921 and 1997. The first non-Unionist lord mayor since the partition of Ireland in 1921 was David Cook from the Alliance Party who was elected in 1978. The first nationalist lord mayor was not appointed until the election of Alban Maginness from the Social Democratic and Labour Party (SDLP) in 1997, while a Sinn Féin lord mayor was first elected in 2002. The loss of the Unionist majority on the Council in 1997 has resulted in a greater rotation of the position amongst the parties, which, like other elected positions within the Council such as Committee chairs, is now filled using the Jefferson method.

== Powers and duties ==
The Lord's Mayor's role comprises these powers and duties:

- In times of natural disaster the Lord Mayor may direct resources such as Police, Fire and Ambulance as they see fit
- Presiding over meetings of the council and, in the case of equality of votes, the Lord Mayor has a second or casting vote
- Promoting and raising awareness of the council's main objectives and priority issues
- Encouraging and supporting all aspects of life in Belfast by attending civic and public events
- Receiving distinguished visitors to the city
- Acting as host on behalf of the council and the citizens of Belfast at civic functions
- Acting as a spokesperson to the local, national and international media
- Providing an appropriate response on behalf of Belfast at times of local, national and international catastrophe
- Supporting and encouraging charitable and other appeals as appropriate
- Promoting Belfast's business, commercial, cultural and social life
- Promoting Belfast as a place of excellence in which to do business and as a tourist destination.

== Deputy lord mayor ==
The position of deputy lord mayor has a representative role within the city along with the lord mayor. When the lord mayor is unavailable for whatever reason, it is the responsibility of the deputy lord mayor to carry out the representative functions of the lord mayor.

While the deputy lord mayor is in office, they combine their mayoral responsibilities with their responsibilities as a councillor, such as serving on Council Committees.

== Monuments ==
Monuments in the grounds of Belfast City Hall

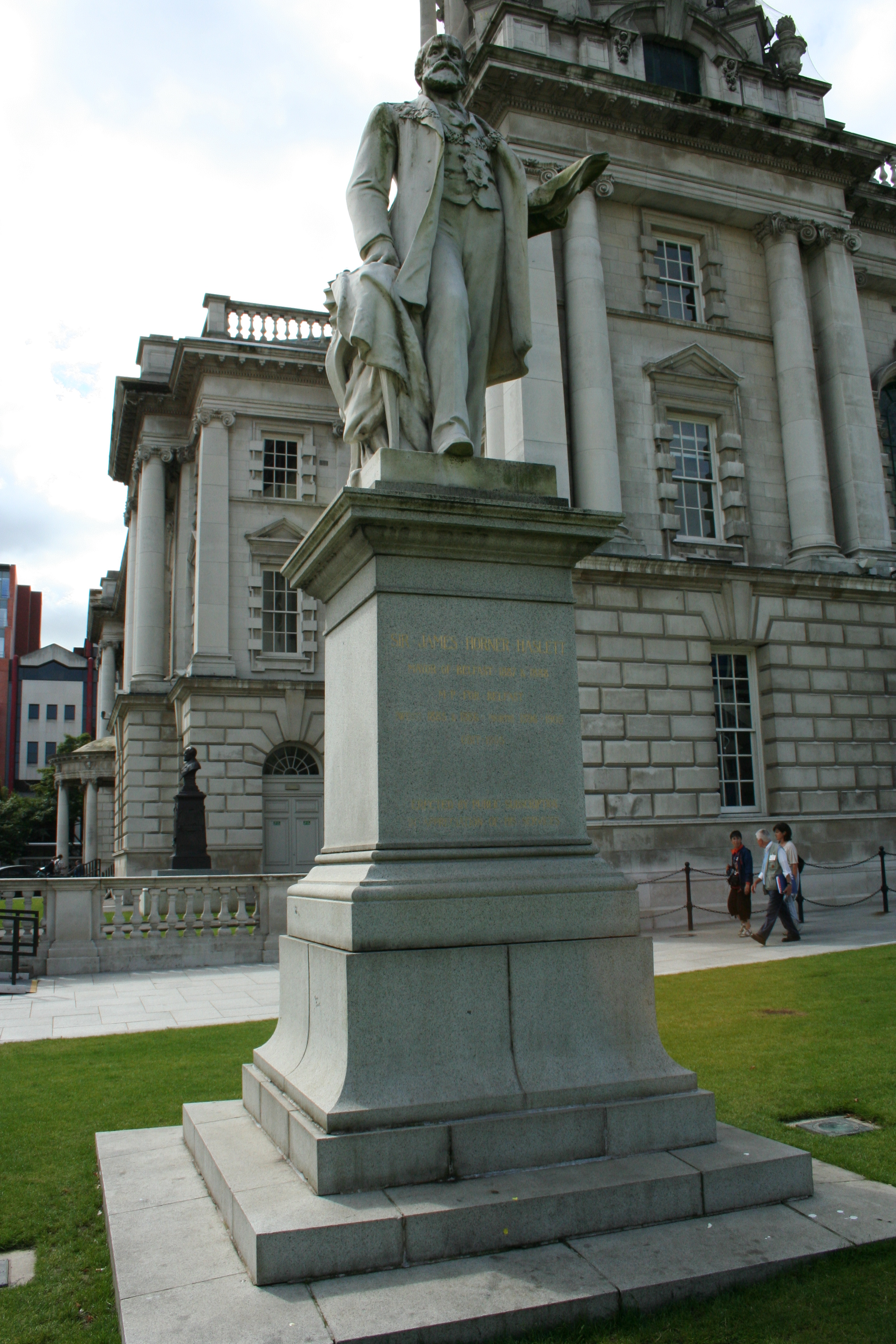
James Horner Haslett
Mayor of Belfast
1887–88

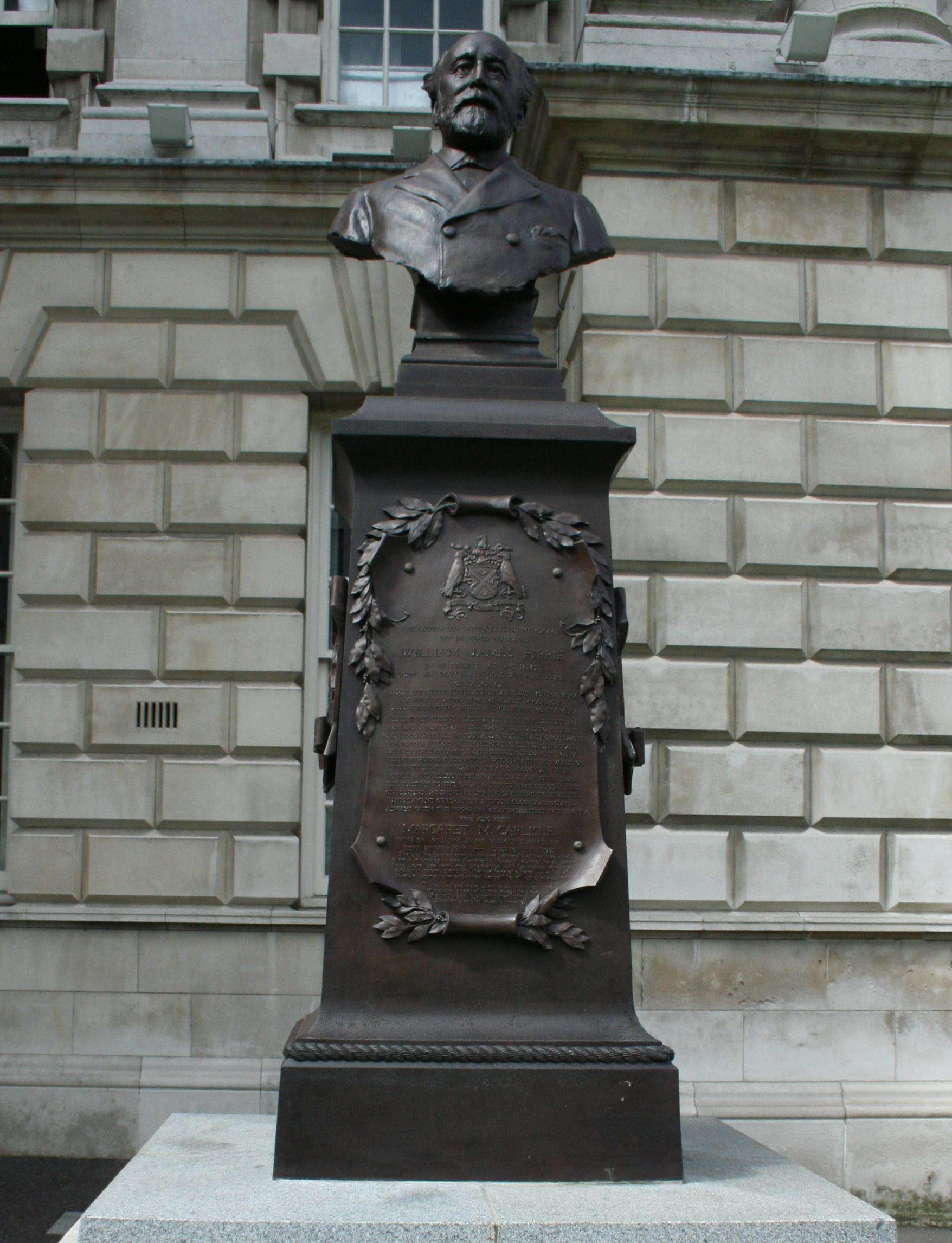
William James Pirrie
Lord Mayor of Belfast
1896–98

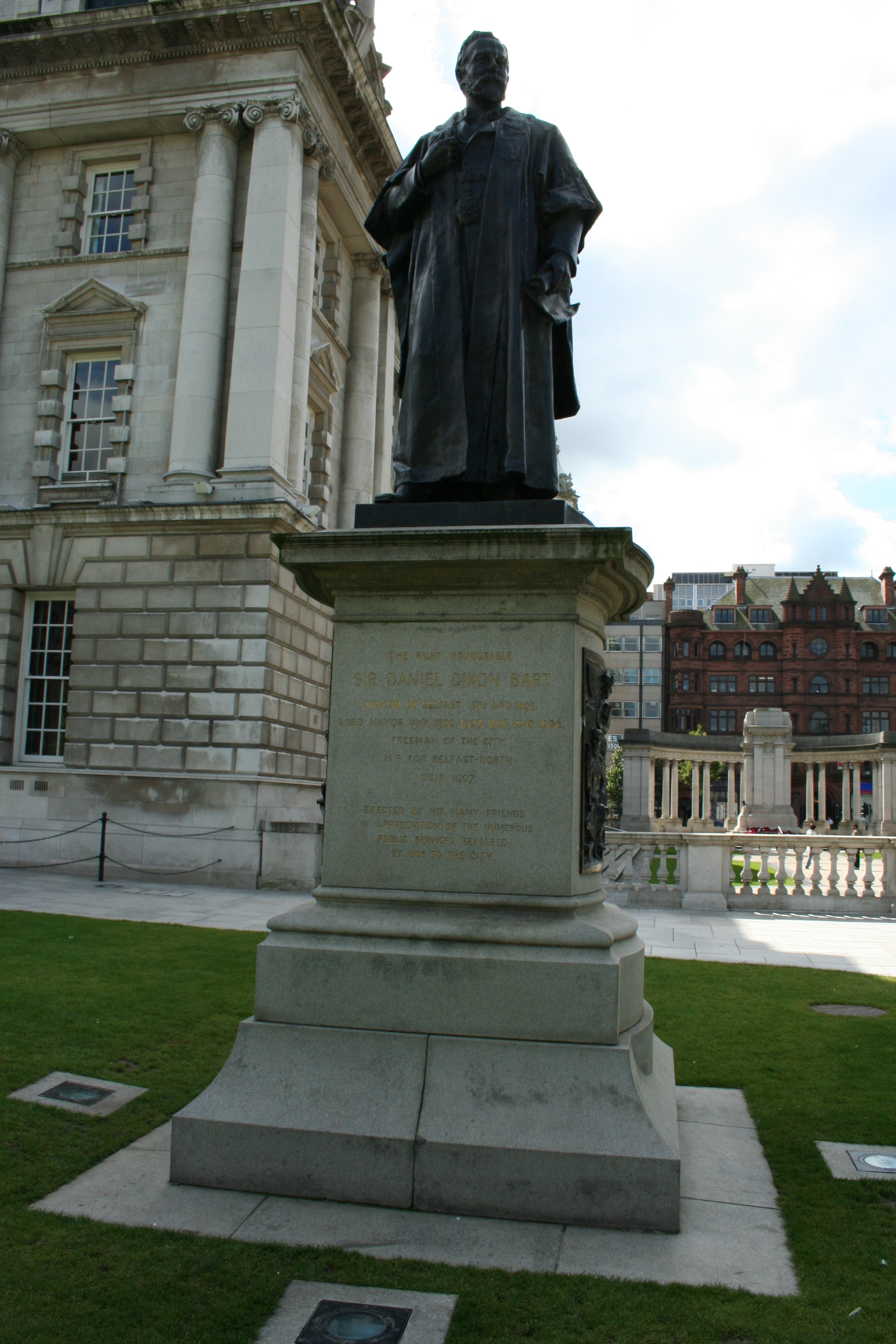
Sir Daniel Dixon
Lord Mayor of Belfast
1892–93, 1901–04 & 1905–07

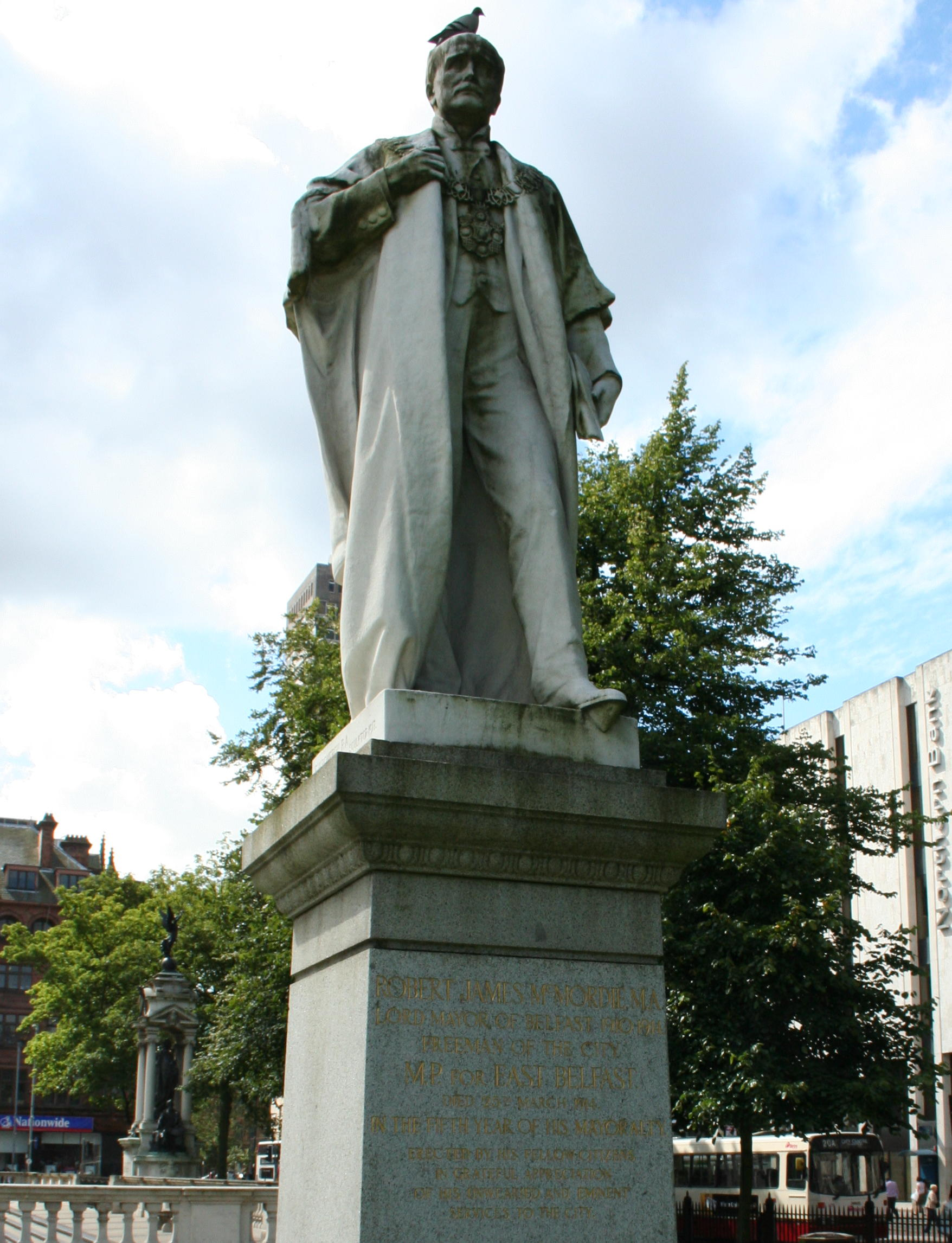
R. J. McMordie
Lord Mayor of Belfast
1910–14

== Sovereigns of Belfast (1613–1842) ==
The following is a list of sovereigns of Belfast from the creation of the position in 1613 until it was replaced by the position of Mayor in 1842.

=== 17th century ===
- 1613: John Vesey
- 1614: John Willowbye
- 1615: James Burr
- 1616: James Burr
- 1617: Carew Hart
- 1618: Carew Hart
- 1619: George Theaker
- 1620: George Theaker
- 1621: No Name
- 1622: Edward Holmes
- 1623: Edward Holmes
- 1624: No Name
- 1625: No Name
- 1626: Edward Holmes
- 1627: Carew Hart
- 1628: Edward Holmes
- 1629: No Name
- 1630: Walter House Crymble
- 1631: Lewys Thompson
- 1632: Robert Foster
- 1633: Thomas Brampton or Brumston
- 1634: Lewys Thompson
- 1635: Henry Le Squire
- 1636: Henry Le Squire
- 1637: John Wasber
- 1638: John Leathes, Senior
- 1639: Henry Le Squire
- 1640: John Haddock
- 1641: Thomas Hamington
- 1642: Thomas Stephenson
- 1643: Thomas Theaker
- 1644: Robert Foster
- 1645: William Leathes
- 1646: John Asshe or Ayshe
- 1647: Hugh Doake
- 1648: Robert Foster
- 1649: George Giles Martin
- 1650: Thomas Harrington
- 1651: Thomas Harrington
- 1652: Thomas Waring
- 1653: Thomas Waring
- 1654: Thomas Theaker
- 1655: John Leathes Junior
- 1656: Thomas Waring
- 1657: William Leathes
- 1658: William Leathes
- 1659: William Leathes and Francis Meek
- 1660: Captain Francis Meek
- 1661: John Rigby
- 1662: George Macartney
- 1663: George Macartney
- 1664: Thomas Waring
- 1665: Thomas Waring
- 1666: Edward Raynell
- 1667: Captain George Macartney
- 1668: Captain George Macartney
- 1669: William Warring
- 1670: William Warring
- 1671: Thomas Walcott
- 1672: George Macartney
- 1673: George Macartney
- 1674: Hugh Eccles
- 1675: George Macartney
- 1676: George Macartney
- 1677: George Macartney
- 1678: George Macartney
- 1679: George Macartney
- 1680: George Macartney
- 1681: Francis Tholford
- 1682: Lewis Thompson
- 1683: John Hamilton
- 1684: John Hamilton
- 1685: Thomas Knox
- 1686: Captain Robert Leathes
- 1687: Captain Robert Leathes
- 1688: Captain Robert Leathes
- 1689: Captain Robert Leathes
- 1690: Captain Robert Leathes
- 1691: William Lockhart
- 1692: James Macartney
- 1693: William Craford
- 1694: William Craford
- 1695: Captain Edward Harrison
- 1696: Lewis Thompson
- 1697: Arthur Chichester, 3rd Earl of Donegall
- 1698: David Smith
- 1699: David Smith

=== 18th century ===
- 1700: George Macartney
- 1701: John Chalmers
- 1702: David Butle
- 1703: David Butle
- 1704: David Butle and George Macartney
- 1705: George Macartney
- 1706: George Macartney
- 1707: George Macartney
- 1708: George Macartney
- 1709: Richard Wilson
- 1710: Roger Haddock
- 1711: Roger Haddock
- 1712: Hans Hamilton
- 1713: Robert Leathes
- 1714: James Gurner
- 1715: James Gurner
- 1716: Henry Ellis
- 1717: John Carpenter
- 1718: John Carpenter
- 1719: Henry Ellis
- 1720: Robert Le Byrtt
- 1721: Robert Le Byrtt
- 1722: Henry Ellis
- 1723: George Macartney
- 1724: Major George Macartney and Nathaniel Byrtt
- 1725: Nathaniel Byrtt
- 1726: Dr. James Macartney
- 1727: John Clugstone
- 1728: John Clugstone
- 1729: Thomas Banks
- 1730: John Duff
- 1731: Arthur Byrtt
- 1732: John Clugstone
- 1733: John Clugstone
- 1734: Robert Le Byrtt
- 1735: Robert Le Byrtt
- 1736: Margetson Saunders
- 1737: Margetson Saunders
- 1738: Margetson Saunders
- 1739: Robert Le Byrtt
- 1740: Robert Le Byrtt
- 1741: John Duff
- 1742: John Duff
- 1743: Robert Le Byrtt
- 1744: Arthur Byrtt
- 1745: Arthur Byrtt
- 1746: Arthur Byrtt
- 1747: John Duff
- 1748: Margetson Saunders
- 1749: George Macartney
- 1750: George Macartney
- 1751: George Macartney
- 1752: Arthur Byrtt
- 1753: John Duff
- 1754: Margetson Saunders
- 1755: Stewart Banks
- 1756: Stewart Banks
- 1757: Arthur Byrtt
- 1758: Stewart Banks
- 1759: George Macartney
- 1760: Stephen Havon
- 1761: James Hamilton
- 1762: Stewart Banks
- 1763: George Macartney
- 1764: George Macartney
- 1765: George Macartney
- 1766: Stewart Banks
- 1767: George Macartney
- 1768: George Macartney
- 1769: James Hamilton
- 1770: Stephen Havon
- 1771: Stewart Banks
- 1772: Sham Thompson
- 1773: James Lewis
- 1774: James Lewis
- 1775: George Black
- 1776: George Black
- 1777: James Lewis
- 1778: Stewart Banks
- 1779: Samuel Black
- 1780: Samuel Black
- 1781: Samuel Black
- 1782: George Black
- 1783: George Black
- 1784: Samuel Black
- 1785: George Black
- 1786: Rev. William Bristow
- 1787: Rev. William Bristow
- 1788: Rev. William Bristow
- 1789: Samuel Black
- 1790: Rev. William Bristow
- 1791: Rev. William Bristow
- 1792: Rev. William Bristow
- 1793: Rev. William Bristow
- 1794: Rev. William Bristow
- 1795: Rev. William Bristow
- 1796: Rev. William Bristow
- 1797: John Brown
- 1798: Rev. William Bristow
- 1799: John Brown

=== 19th century ===
- 1800–1801: John Brown
- 1802: Arthur Chichester
- 1803–1806: James Edward May (MP for Belfast, 1801–1814)
- 1807–1808: Rev. Edward May
- 1809–1810: James Edward May (MP for Belfast, 1801–1814)
- 1811: Rev. Edward May
- 1812–1815: Thomas Verner
- 1816: Rev. Edward May
- 1817–1818: Thomas Ludford Stewart
- 1819–1822: Thomas Verner
- 1823: John Agnew and Andrew Alexander
- 1824: Andrew Alexander and John Agnew
- 1825–1826: John Agnew
- 1827: Rev. Lord Edward Chichester
- 1828–1833: Sir Stephen Edward May (MP for Belfast, 1814–1816)
- 1834–1840: John Agnew
- 1841–1842: Thomas Verner, Jun (Last Sovereign of the Old Corporation)

== Mayors of Belfast (1842–1892) ==
The following is a list of mayors of Belfast from the creation of the position in 1842 until it was replaced by the position of Lord Mayor in 1892.

- 1842–1844: George Dunbar (2 years)
- 1844–1845: John Dunbar
- 1845–1846: Andrew Mulholland
- 1846–1847: John Kane
- 1847–1848: John Harrison
- 1848–1849: George Suffern
- 1849–1850: William Gillilan Johnson
- 1850–1852: James Sterling (2 years)
- 1852–1853: Samuel Graeme Fenton
- 1853–1854: William McGee
- 1854–1855: Frederick Harry Lewis
- 1855–1856: Thomas Verner
- 1856–1859: Samuel Gibson Getty (3 years)
- 1859–1861: William Ewart (2 years)
- 1861–1862: Edward Coey
- 1862–1863: Charles Lanyon
- 1863–1866: John Lyttle (3 years)
- 1866–1867: William Mullan
- 1867–1868: David Taylor
- 1868–1869: Samuel McCausland
- 1869–1870: Frederick Harry Lewis
- 1870–1871: Samuel Browne
- 1871–1872: Philip Johnston
- 1872–1873: (Sir) John Savage
- 1873–1875: James Henderson (2 years)
- 1875–1876: Thomas Graham Lindsay
- 1876–1877: Robert Boag
- 1877–1879: Sir John Preston (2 years)
- 1879–1881: John Browne (2 years)
- 1881–1883: Sir Edward Cowan (2 years)
- 1883–1885: Sir David Taylor (2 years)
- 1885–1888: Sir Edward Harland, Bt (2 years)
- 1887–1889: Sir James Horner Haslett (2 years)
- 1889–1891: Charles C. Connor (2 years)

Source: Belfast City Council

== Lord Mayors of Belfast (1892–present) ==
The following is a list of lord mayors of Belfast since the creation of the position in 1892.

=== 19th century ===
No.	From	To	Name	Party
1	1892	1893	Daniel Dixon	Irish Unionist
2	1894	1896	William McCammond	Irish Unionist
3	1896	1898	William James Pirrie	Liberal
4	1898	1899	James Henderson	Irish Unionist
5	1899	1900	Otto Jaffe	Irish Unionist

=== 20th century ===
No.	From	To	Name	Party
6	1900	1901	Sir Robert J. McConnell	Irish Unionist
7	1901	1904	Sir Daniel Dixon	Irish Unionist
8	1904	1905	Sir Otto Jaffe	Irish Unionist
9	1905	1907	Sir Daniel Dixon	Irish Unionist
10	1907	1908	The 9th Earl of Shaftesbury	Irish Unionist
11	1908	1910	Sir Robert Anderson	Irish Unionist
12	1910	1914	R. J. McMordie	Irish Unionist
13	1914	1917	Sir Crawford McCullagh	Irish Unionist
14	1917	1919	James Johnston	Irish Unionist
15	1919	1920	John Campbell White	Irish Unionist
16	1920	1923	William F. Coates	UUP
17	1923	1929	William George Turner	UUP
18	1929	1931	Sir William F. Coates	UUP
19	1931	1942	Sir Crawford McCullagh	UUP
20	1942	1942	George Ruddell Black	UUP
21	1943	1946	Sir Crawford McCullagh	UUP
22	1946	1949	Sir William F. Neill	UUP
23	1949	1951	William E. G. Johnston	UUP
24	1951	1953	James Henry Norritt	UUP
25	1953	1955	Sir Percival Brown	UUP
26	1955	1957	Sir Robert Harcourt	UUP
27	1957	1959	Cecil McKee	UUP
28	1959	1961	Robin Kinahan	UUP
29	1961	1963	Martin Kelso Wallace	UUP
30	1963	1966	William Jenkins	UUP
31	1966	1969	William Duncan Geddis	UUP
32	1969	1972	Joseph Foster Cairns	UUP
33	1972	1975	Sir William Christie	UUP
34	1975	1977	Sir Myles Humphreys	UUP
35	1977	1978	James Stewart	UUP
36	1978	1979	David Cook	Alliance
37	1979	1980	Billy Bell	UUP
38	1980	1981	John Carson	UUP
39	1981	1982	Grace Bannister	UUP
40	1982	1983	Thomas Patton	UUP
41	1983	1985	Alfie Ferguson	UUP
42	1985	1986	John Carson	UUP
43	1986	1987	Sammy Wilson	DUP
44	1987	1988	J.J. Dixon Gilmore	UUP
45	1988	1989	Nigel Dodds	DUP
46	1989	1990	Reg Empey	UUP
47	1990	1991	Fred Cobain	UUP
48	1991	1992	Nigel Dodds	DUP
49	1992	1993	Herbert Ditty	UUP
50	1993	1994	Reg Empey	UUP
51	1994	1995	Hugh Smyth	PUP
52	1995	1996	Eric Smyth	DUP
53	1996	1997	Ian Adamson	UUP
54	1997	1998	Alban Maginness	SDLP
55	1998	1999	David Alderdice	Alliance
56	1999	2000	Bob Stoker	UUP

=== 21st century ===
No.	From	To	Name	Image	Party colour
57	2000	2001	Sammy Wilson		DUP
58	2001	2002	Jim Rodgers		UUP
59	2002	2003	Alex Maskey		Sinn Féin
60	2003	2004	Martin Morgan		SDLP
61	2004	2005	Tom Ekin		Alliance
62	2005	2006	Wallace Browne		DUP
63	2006	2007	Patrick McCarthy		SDLP
64	2007	2008	Jim Rodgers		UUP
65	2008	2009	Tom Hartley		Sinn Féin
66	2009	2010	Naomi Long		Alliance
67	2010	2011	Pat Convery		SDLP
68	2011	2012	Niall Ó Donnghaile		Sinn Féin
69	2012	2013	Gavin Robinson		DUP
70	2013	2014	Máirtín Ó Muilleoir		Sinn Féin
71	2014	2015	Nichola Mallon		SDLP
72	2015	2016	Arder Carson		Sinn Féin
73	2016	2017	Brian Kingston		DUP
74	2017	2018	Nuala McAllister		Alliance
75	2018	2019	Deirdre Hargey		Sinn Féin
76	2019	2019	John Finucane		Sinn Féin
77	2019	2020	Danny Baker		Sinn Féin
78	2020	2021	Frank McCoubrey		DUP
79	2021	2022	Kate Nicholl		Alliance
80	2022	2022	Michael Long		Alliance
81	2022	2023	Tina Black		Sinn Féin
82	2023	2024	Ryan Murphy		Sinn Féin
83	2024	2025	Micky Murray		Alliance
84	2025	2026	Tracy Kelly		DUP
85	2026	Present	Róis-Máire Donnelly		Sinn Féin

== Deputy Lord Mayors ==
=== 20th century ===
No.	From	To	Name	Party
1	1975	1977	Grace Bannister	UUP
	1977	1979	Post vacant	
2	1978	1979	Dorothy Dunlop	UUP
	1979	1980	Post vacant	
	1980	1981	Post vacant	
3	1981	1982	Frank Millar	Ind. Unionist
4	1982	1983	Frederick Edward (Ted) Ashby	DUP
5	1983	1984	Hugh Smyth	PUP
6	1984	1985	Billy Blair	UUP
7	1985	1986	Billy Dickson	DUP
8	1986	1987	Dixie Gilmore	UUP
	1987	1988	Post vacant	
9	1988	1989	Reg Empey	UUP
	1989	1990	Post vacant	
10	1990	1991	Eric Smyth	DUP
12	1991	1992	Herbert Ditty	UUP
13	1992	1993	Frank Millar	Ind. Unionist
14	1993	1994	Hugh Smyth	PUP
15	1994	1995	Ian Adamson	UUP
16	1995	1996	Alasdair McDonnell	SDLP
17	1996	1997	Margaret Crooks	UUP
18	1997	1998	Jim Rodgers	UUP
19	1998	1999	Bob Stoker	UUP
20	1999	2000	Marie Moore	Sinn Féin

=== 21st century ===
No.	From	To	Name	Party
21	2000	2001	Frank McCoubrey	Ulster Democratic
22	2001	2002	Hugh Smyth	PUP
	2002	2003	Post vacant	
23	2003	2004	Margaret Crooks	UUP
24	2004	2005	Joe O'Donnell	Sinn Féin
25	2005	2006	Pat Convery	SDLP
26	2006	2007	Ruth Patterson	DUP
27	2007	2008	Bernie Kelly	SDLP
28	2008	2009	David Browne	UUP
29	2009	2010	Danny Lavery	Sinn Féin
30	2010	2011	William Humphrey	DUP
31	2011	2012	Ruth Patterson	DUP
32	2012	2013	Tierna Cunningham	Sinn Féin
33	2013	2014	Christopher Stalford	DUP
34	2014	2015	Máire Hendron	Alliance
35	2015	2016	Guy Spence	DUP
36	2016	2017	Mary Ellen Campbell	Sinn Féin
37	2017	2018	Sonia Copeland	UUP
38	2018	2019	Emmet McDonough-Brown	Alliance
39	2019	2020	Peter McReynolds	Alliance
40	2020	2021	Paul McCusker	SDLP
41	2021	2022	Tom Haire	DUP
42	2022	2023	Michelle Kelly	Alliance
43	2023	2024	Áine Groogan	Green (NI)
44	2024	2025	Andrew McCormick	DUP
45	2025	2026	Paul Doherty	Independent
46	2026	Present	Hedley Abernethy	Alliance

== See also ==
- Lord Mayor of Dublin
- Lord Mayor of Cork
