= Nuala McAllister =

Alliance Party of Northern Ireland MLA

Nuala McAllister MLA
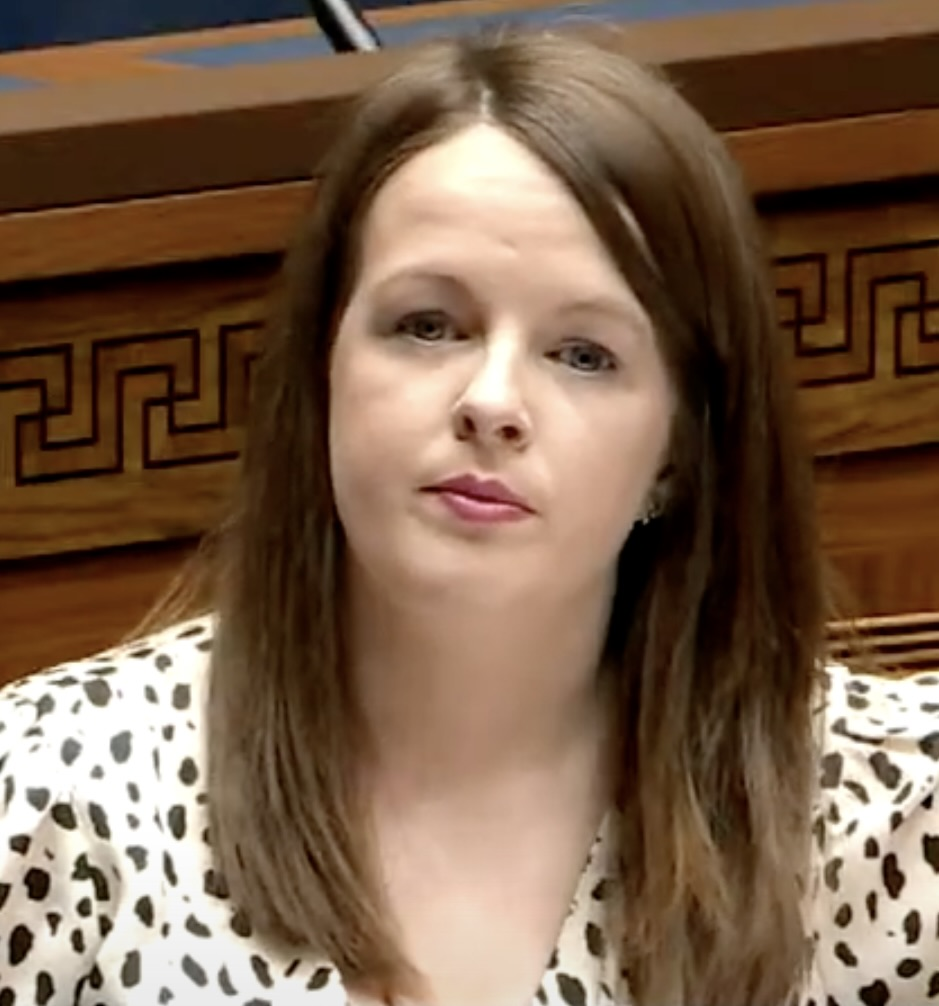

Member of the Northern Ireland Assembly for Belfast North
- Incumbent
- Assumed office 7 May 2022
- Preceded by: Nichola Mallon

74th Lord Mayor of Belfast
- In office 1 June 2017 – 1 June 2018
- Deputy: Sonia Copeland
- Preceded by: Brian Kingston
- Succeeded by: Deirdre Hargey

Member of Belfast City Council
- In office 22 May 2014 – 7 May 2022
- Preceded by: Tierna Cunningham
- Succeeded by: Sam Nelson
- Constituency: Castle

Personal details
- Born: March 5, 1990 (age 36) Belfast, Northern Ireland
- Party: Alliance
- Domestic partner: Sam Nelson
- Children: 2
- Occupation: Politician
- Website: Assembly profile

Nuala McAllister (born 5 March 1990) is an Alliance Party politician who has been a Member of the Legislative Assembly (MLA) for Belfast North since 2022.

== Early life ==
McAllister was raised in a Catholic family, but is now an atheist. Her mother was a "working class, north Belfast Catholic woman who had eight children" and Nuala was "made to read at Mass until I was 16 and go to Mass every single Sunday ... at quite a young age I'd already begun to question everything”. “Why was always a question for me and, quite quickly, I just didn’t believe."

She was educated at Dominican College, Fortwilliam, and then at Ulster University.

== Political career ==
=== Councillor (2014–2022) ===
McAllister was elected as an Alliance Party councillor for the Castle DEA in North Belfast on Belfast City Council at the 2014 local elections, taking 9.64% of the first preference votes. She was re-elected at the 2019 local elections, topping the poll with 1,787 first preference votes and being elected at the first count – narrowly edging out future Sinn Féin MP John Finucane, who was also elected on the first count.

=== Lord Mayor of Belfast and rising profile (2017–2022) ===
She was the Lord Mayor of Belfast in 2017–2018. She announced the theme of her mayoralty as 'Global Belfast'. She described her aim as promoting "Belfast as an open, inclusive and welcoming place to live and do business". McAllister garnered controversy for being outspoken in support of liberalising Northern Ireland's abortion laws, as well as due to her campaigning for marriage equality during her term as Lord Mayor. Fellow Belfast City councillor Jim Rodgers called McAllister "one of the worst lord mayors we have ever had" for "failing to remain impartial". Alliance responded to criticism of McAllister by saying that she was "a breath of fresh air in the role and an excellent role model for young women and working mums everywhere".

McAllister ran in both the 2016 and 2017 Northern Ireland Assembly elections as the Alliance candidate for Belfast North, where she was the runner up both times – 7th (when the constituency had 6 seats) and 6th (when the constituency moved to 5 seats) – missing out on a seat by 1,012 and then just 556 votes.

She also stood - unsuccessfully - for election in the Belfast North Westminster constituency at the 2019 UK general election. She came in a distant third place with 4,824 votes, equating to 9.8% of the total vote. However, this was an increase of 4.4% compared to the previous Alliance candidate in 2017 (her partner – Sam Nelson).

=== Member of the Legislative Assembly (2022–) ===
Nuala McAllister was Alliance's candidate for the 2022 Assembly election in Belfast North. She polled 4,381 first preference votes and was elected on the 11th count. She gained the seat held by SDLP Deputy Leader and Infrastructure Minister, Nichola Mallon, by a margin of 991 votes, in one of 9 gains for Alliance in the election.

She contested Belfast North at the 2024 general election, coming third with 4,274 votes (10.6%).

== Personal life ==
McAllister has two sons with her partner, Sam Nelson, and was the first "young mother" to be Lord Mayor.
