= Martin Morgan =

Irish politician

60th Lord Mayor of Belfast
- In office 1 June 2003 – 1 June 2004
- Preceded by: Alex Maskey
- Succeeded by: Tom Ekin

Member of Belfast City Council
- In office 19 May 1993 – 5 May 2005
- Preceded by: Brian Feeney
- Succeeded by: Alban Maginness
- Constituency: Oldpark

Personal details
- Party: SDLP
- Spouse: Dympna Morgan
- Education: Queen's University, Belfast

Martin Morgan is an Irish former politician for the Social Democratic and Labour Party (SDLP). Married to Dympna, a double graduate from the Queen's University of Belfast and a qualified Master's Level Social Worker, Morgan has been a political activist since his teenage years.

A former Vice-Chairperson of the SDLP and Executive member. In 1996, he was an unsuccessful candidate in the Northern Ireland Forum election in North Belfast. He was a councillor on Belfast City Council until 2005. Morgan was the youngest Nationalist and Catholic to be elected Lord Mayor of Belfast until the election of Niall Ó Donnghaile (SF). He stood for the party in the 2004 European Parliament elections. He was the youngest ever Belfast councillor when first elected.

He questioned, but abided by, SDLP support for the Police Service of Northern Ireland (PSNI). The PSNI was accused by Morgan and representatives of the local community of using heavy-handed policing to force an Orange Order parade through the mainly Catholic Ardoyne area of North Belfast. Morgan left the SDLP after seeing out his third term of office. He writes a weekly "Straight Talking" column in the Belfast newspaper North Belfast News. This column deals with current affairs, political and social responsibility matters, particularly but not exclusively in North Belfast.

Morgan's grandfather William Mullan was a member of the Irish Army colour party which accompanied 1916 rebel Padraig Pearse's body to the graveyard.

Civic offices
Preceded by Alex Maskey	Lord Mayor of Belfast; 2003–2004	Succeeded by Tom Ekin
