= David Browne (politician) =

Politician from Northern Ireland

David Browne MBE

Deputy Lord Mayor of Belfast
- In office June 2008 – June 2009
- Preceded by: Bernie Kelly
- Succeeded by: Danny Lavery

High Sheriff of Belfast
- In office January 2005 – January 2006
- Preceded by: Ruth Patterson
- Succeeded by: William Humphrey

Leader of the Ulster Unionist Party on Belfast City Council
- In office 22 May 2014 – 2 May 2019
- Leader: Mike Nesbitt; Robin Swann
- Succeeded by: Sonia Copeland

Member of Belfast City Council
- In office 19 May 1993 – 4 May 2019
- Preceded by: Frank Millar
- Succeeded by: Mal O'Hara
- Constituency: Castle

Member of the Northern Ireland Forum for Belfast North
- In office 30 May 1996 – 25 April 1998
- Preceded by: New forum
- Succeeded by: Forum dissolved

Personal details
- Born: Belfast, Northern Ireland
- Party: Ulster Unionist Party

David Hugh Browne is a former Northern Irish unionist politician who was deputy Lord Mayor of Belfast from June 2008 to 2009, as well as High Sheriff of Belfast between January 2005 to 2006. Latterly, he had been leader of the Ulster Unionist Party (UUP) on Belfast City Council from 2014 to 2019, and a Belfast City Councillor for the Castle DEA from 1993 to 2019.

== Life ==
Browne was elected to Belfast City Council for the Ulster Unionist Party (UUP) in the Castle electoral area at the 1993 elections. He was then elected to the Northern Ireland Forum in Belfast North in 1996, but was unsuccessful when he stood for the same seat at the 1998 Northern Ireland Assembly election.

Browne continued to hold his council seat for over 25 years, along with a variety of other civic posts. He was appointed as High Sheriff of Belfast in 2005 and, in 2008, he was elected as Deputy Lord Mayor of Belfast. At the 2011 local elections, the UUP were reduced to three seats on the council, one of which was held by Browne, who was subsequently appointed as an alderman. In 2012, he was appointed as a Belfast Harbour Commissioner. He was reappointed as an Alderman in 2015. As of 2017, he was also on the Duncairn Community Centre Committee, the North Belfast Partnership Board and the Northern Ireland Rural Development Programme.

In November 2017, during a council meeting, Browne reportedly called Sinn Féin colleague Ciaran Beattie a "one armed bandit." The remark was considered to have been made in reference to Beattie losing his left hand during an explosion in The Troubles. Sinn Féin's group leader on the council, Jim McVeigh, called on Browne to apologise in a statement, saying: “The vile comments spoken against my colleague’s disability by the UUP Cllr, Davey Browne, are disgraceful and should be withdrawn immediately.” Browne later apologised for the remark.

Browne was defeated at the 2019 City Council elections, as were most of his UUP colleagues.

He endorsed DUP candidates, Dean McCullough and Fred Cobain, ahead of the 2023 local elections, for his former Castle District.

== Honours ==
Browne was awarded an MBE in the Queen’s Birthday Honours List of June 2013, cited for "services to Local Government in Northern Ireland."

== Personal life ==
Browne lived in the Skegoneill area of Belfast at the time of his first Council election and still as of 2017.

Northern Ireland Forum
New forum	Member for North Belfast; 1996–1998	Forum dissolved
Civic offices
Preceded by Ruth Patterson	High Sheriff of Belfast; 2005	Succeeded by William Humphrey
Preceded by Bernie Kelly	Deputy Lord Mayor of Belfast; 2008–2009	Succeeded by Danny Lavery
