= John Ferguson (Northern Ireland politician) =

Northern Irish politician

Member of Belfast City Council
- In office 30 May 1973 – 18 May 1977
- Preceded by: District created
- Succeeded by: John Cushnahan
- Constituency: Belfast Area H

Member of the Legislative Assembly for North Belfast
- In office 28 June 1973 – 1974
- Preceded by: Assembly established
- Succeeded by: Assembly abolished

Personal details
- Born: June 1911 Belfast, Ireland
- Party: Alliance Party (from 1970)
- Other political affiliations: Ulster Unionist (before 1970)

John Ferguson (born June 1911, date of death unknown) was a Northern Irish politician.

== Background ==
Ferguson was born in Belfast in June 1911 and studied at the Moravian School. He worked as a fruit merchant, becoming chairman of the Retail Fruit Federation of Northern Ireland, and also as a volunteer social workers within Toc H, then joined the Ulster Unionist Party (UUP). He stood for the UUP in Belfast Oldpark at the 1965 Northern Ireland general election, and took 40.5% of the vote, but was not elected. In 1967, he became a justice of the peace.

Ferguson was a founder member of the Alliance Party of Northern Ireland, and won a seat on Belfast City Council at the 1973 Northern Ireland local elections. He was also successful in Belfast North at the 1973 Northern Ireland Assembly election, but when he stood in the equivalent Westminster constituency at the October 1974 general election, he took only 8.1% of the vote. He stood again in Belfast North for the Northern Ireland Constitutional Convention, but he narrowly missed re-election.

Northern Ireland Assembly (1973)
New assembly	Assembly Member for North Belfast; 1973–1974	Assembly abolished
