= Nigel Dodds =

Northern Ireland politician (born 1958)

The Right Honourable The Lord Dodds of Duncairn OBE PC
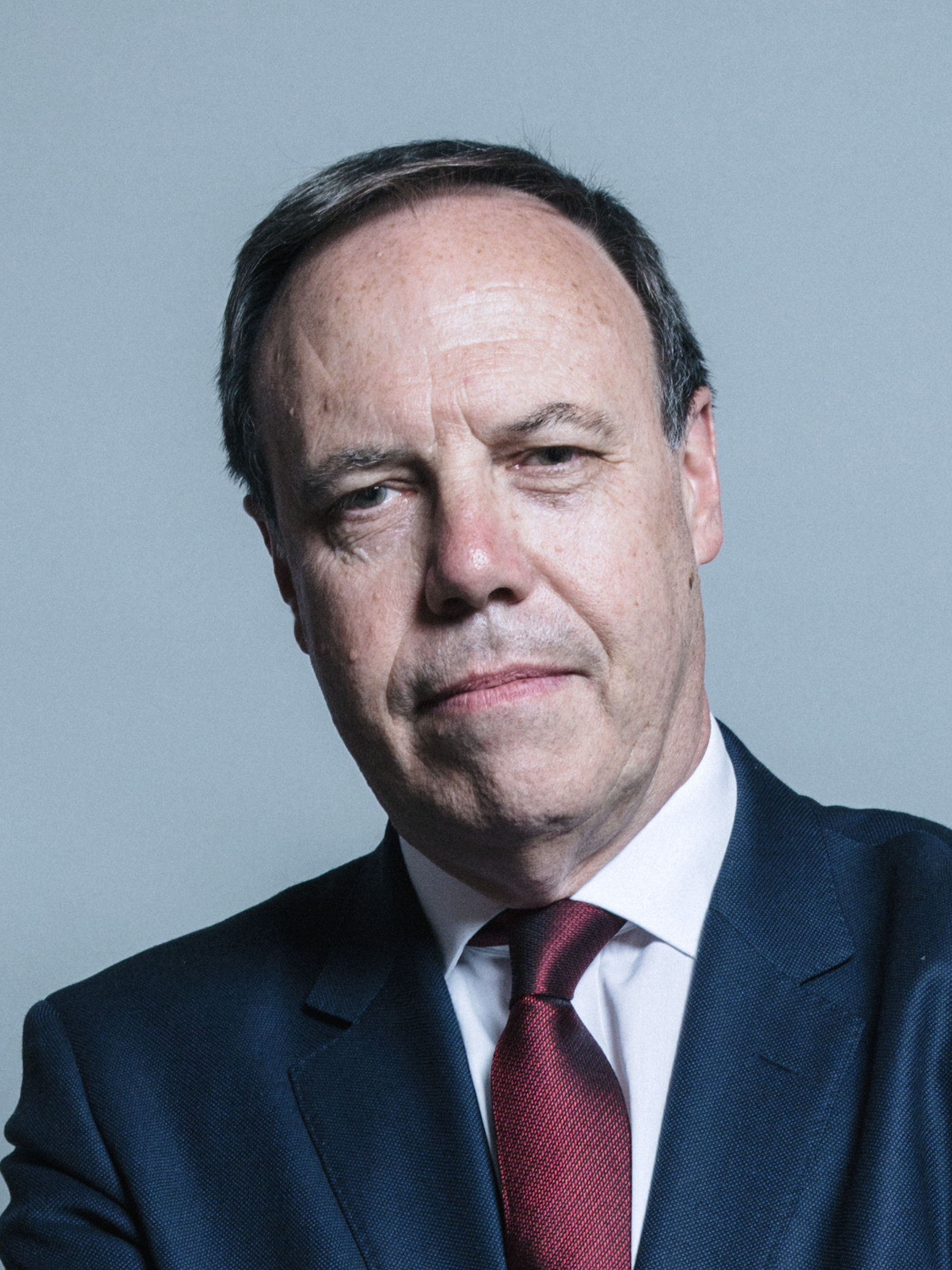
- Official portrait, 2017

Leader of the Democratic Unionist Party in the House of Lords
- Incumbent
- Assumed office 30 June 2021
- Leader: Jeffrey Donaldson; Gavin Robinson
- Preceded by: Office established

Deputy Leader of the Democratic Unionist Party
- In office 31 May 2008 – 28 May 2021
- Leader: Peter Robinson; Arlene Foster
- Preceded by: Peter Robinson
- Succeeded by: Paula Bradley

Leader of the Democratic Unionist Party in the House of Commons
- In office 6 May 2010 – 13 December 2019
- Leader: Peter Robinson; Arlene Foster
- Preceded by: Peter Robinson
- Succeeded by: Jeffrey Donaldson
Ministerial offices
Minister of Finance and Personnel
In office 5 June 2008 – 1 July 2009
First Minister	Peter Robinson
Preceded by	Peter Robinson
Succeeded by	Sammy Wilson
Minister of Enterprise, Trade and Investment
In office 8 May 2007 – 5 June 2008
First Minister	Ian Paisley; Peter Robinson
Preceded by	Reg Empey
Succeeded by	Arlene Foster
Minister for Social Development
In office 24 October 2001 – 14 October 2002
First Minister	Reg Empey (acting); David Trimble
Preceded by	Maurice Morrow
Succeeded by	Margaret Ritchie
In office 21 November 1999 – 27 July 2000
First Minister	David Trimble
Preceded by	Office established
Succeeded by	Maurice Morrow
Parliamentary offices
Member of the House of Lords
Lord Temporal
Life peerage 18 September 2020
Member of Parliament for Belfast North
In office 7 June 2001 – 6 November 2019
Preceded by	Cecil Walker
Succeeded by	John Finucane
Member of the Legislative Assembly for Belfast North
In office 25 June 1998 – 10 September 2010
Preceded by	Constituency established
Succeeded by	William Humphrey
Member of the Northern Ireland Forum for Belfast North
In office 30 May 1996 – 25 April 1998
Local government offices
45th and 48th Lord Mayor of Belfast
In office 1 June 1991 – 1 June 1992
Preceded by	Fred Cobain
Succeeded by	Herbert Ditty
In office 1 June 1988 – 1 June 1989
Preceded by	J.J. Dixon Gilmore
Succeeded by	Reg Empey
Member of Belfast City Council
In office 15 May 1985 – 5 May 2010
Preceded by	District created
Succeeded by	Lydia Patterson
Constituency	Castle

Personal details
- Born: Nigel Alexander Dodds; 20 August 1958 (age 68) Derry, Northern Ireland
- Party: Democratic Unionist Party
- Spouse: Diane Dodds
- Children: 3
- Education: St John's College, Cambridge; Queen's University of Belfast
- Website: Official website

Nigel Alexander Dodds, Baron Dodds of Duncairn (born 20 August 1958) is a Northern Irish unionist politician serving as Leader of the Democratic Unionist Party (DUP) in the House of Lords since 2021. He previously served as deputy leader of the DUP from 2008 to 2021 and leader of the DUP in the House of Commons from 2010 to 2019.

Born in Derry and raised in County Fermanagh, Dodds originally practised as a barrister. He has been Lord Mayor of Belfast twice, and served as General Secretary of the DUP from 1993 to 2008. Dodds served as a member of the Northern Ireland Assembly from 1998 to 2010. He served in three ministerial portfolios in the Northern Ireland Executive, lastly as Minister of Finance and Personnel from 2008 to 2009, a position he assumed shortly after he became Deputy Leader.

He became Member of Parliament for the Belfast North constituency at the 2001 UK general election and served in that role until he was defeated by John Finucane of Sinn Féin in 2019. In July 2020, he was nominated for a peerage in the House of Lords and announced in September 2020 that he would take the title Lord Dodds of Duncairn.

== Early life and career ==
His father Joe Dodds, a long-standing Democratic Unionist Party (DUP) member, was a member of the Fermanagh District Council until his death in 2008.

He was educated at Portora Royal School in Enniskillen, County Fermanagh, and studied law at St John's College, Cambridge, from which he graduated with a first-class degree, and where he won the university scholarship, McMahan studentship and Winfield Prize for Law. Upon graduation, he returned to Northern Ireland and, after studying at the Institute of Professional Legal Studies at Queen's University of Belfast, was called to the Bar of Northern Ireland. After working as a barrister, he worked at the Secretariat of the European Parliament from 1984 to 1996.

== Politics ==
Dodds entered municipal politics in the 1981 local elections when he stood unsuccessfully for the Enniskillen part of Fermanagh District Council. Four years later in 1985, he was elected to Belfast City Council for the religiously and socially mixed Castle electoral area in the north of the city.

He attracted controversy when he and then DUP leader Ian Paisley attended a wake for Ulster Volunteer Force (UVF) leader John Bingham.

Dodds soon rose to prominence in the party. He was elected for two one-year terms as Lord Mayor of Belfast in June 1988 when he became the youngest ever Lord Mayor of Belfast aged 29 and June 1992 which was only surpassed when Niall Ó Donnghaile was elected as Lord Mayor in 2011 at the age of 25. In the same year, Dodds stood unsuccessfully for the East Antrim constituency in the Westminster election. He was elected to the Northern Ireland Forum in 1996, and topped the poll in Belfast North in all three elections to the reconstituted Northern Ireland Assembly in 1998, 2003 and 2007. He was awarded the OBE in 1997 for services to local government.

North Belfast had historically been strong territory for the DUP, Johnny McQuade representing the constituency in the British House of Commons from 1979 to 1983. The DUP stood down in favour of the Ulster Unionist Party in Westminster elections in the late 1980s and 1990s, in order to avoid splitting the unionist vote. Then, in 2001, Dodds challenged sitting Ulster Unionist Party (UUP) MP Cecil Walker, despite the danger of losing the mixed constituency to an Irish nationalist. Dodds won just over 40% of the overall vote and with that a 6,387 majority over Sinn Féin's Gerry Kelly, with the incumbent Walker being pushed into fourth place.

Dodds was Minister of Social Development in the Northern Ireland Executive from 21 November 1999 but resigned on 27 July 2000, then served again from 24 October 2001, when the devolved institutions were restored, until he was dismissed from office on 11 October 2002, shortly before the Executive and the Northern Ireland Assembly were collapsed by the UUP.

Dodds is vice-chair of the All Party Parliamentary Flag Group.

Dodds became Deputy Leader of the Democratic Unionist Party (DUP) in June 2008. He was appointed to the Privy Council of the United Kingdom on 9 June 2010, when he entered Westminster after the general election as the new party leader in parliament.

In April 2009, a leaked report showing MPs' expenses listed Dodds' with the highest expenses of any MP in Northern Ireland, ranking him 13th highest of all UK MPs.

In a 2012 Westminster debate on the issue of governance in association football, Dodds highlighted that footballers born in Northern Ireland often opt to play for the Republic of Ireland national football team instead, saying "action needs to be taken to stop the haemorrhaging of talent from Northern Ireland".

=== Paramilitary attack ===
His constituency office was targeted by the Continuity IRA in 2003 when a viable improvised explosive device was left outside the office. The bomb was defused by British Army explosive experts.

=== 12 July 2013 injury ===
At the Twelfth of July 2013 Orange order parades, Dodds was knocked unconscious at Woodvale Avenue in the Greater Shankill area of North Belfast by a brick thrown by fellow Ulster loyalists rioting against Police Service of Northern Ireland roadblocks. The violence broke out following the decision by the Parades Commission to bar Orangemen from walking past the Irish republican Ardoyne area. Dodds had been expelled from the House of Commons chamber by Speaker John Bercow for using unparliamentary language on 10 July 2013, after Dodds had refused to withdraw his accusation that the Conservative Secretary of State for Northern Ireland Theresa Villiers was being "deliberately deceptive" in answering questions about her powers in respect of what he called the "outrageous" Parades Commission ruling.

=== 2017 onwards ===
Dodds said that the 2017 general election had "done more to maximise our influence" as it led to the DUP supporting a Conservative minority government. Arlene Foster together with Dodds set up the 'confidence-and-supply deal' with the Conservative Government; but relations with Theresa May have not always been smooth. Dodds opposed any attempts from the Republic of Ireland for 'annexation' of the north, and rejected the Brussels "Backstop option", stating it was tantamount to a surrender of sovereignty.

In January 2018, the Renewable Heat Incentive scandal made Dodds even more important to the government in Westminster, because the collapse of the Executive for the first time since 2002, was met with a deal for an extra £1 billion in funding for Northern Ireland. In June 2018, Dodds stated that "anything that would diminish the Union of the United Kingdom would be a clear red line for us."

In March 2019, Dodds was one of 21 MPs who voted against LGBT inclusive sex and relationship education in English schools.

He was defeated at the 2019 United Kingdom general election, losing his seat to Sinn Féin's John Finucane.

=== House of Lords ===
Dodds was nominated for a life peerage in Boris Johnson's 2019 Dissolution Honours and created Baron Dodds of Duncairn on 18 September 2020. He made his maiden speech in the House of Lords on 3 November 2020.

On 4 May 2021, Dodds announced that he would not seek re-election as deputy leader.

== Personal life ==
Dodds is married to DUP politician Diane Dodds; they have two sons and one daughter, and live in Banbridge, County Down.

Civic offices
Preceded by Dixie Gilmore	Lord Mayor of Belfast; 1988–1989	Succeeded by Reg Empey
Preceded by Fred Cobain	Lord Mayor of Belfast; 1991–1992	Succeeded by Herbert Ditty
Party political offices
Preceded by Alan Kane	General Secretary of the Democratic Unionist Party; 1993–2008	Succeeded by Michelle McIlveen
Preceded by Peter Robinson	Deputy Leader of the Democratic Unionist Party; 2008–2021	Succeeded by Paula Bradley
Preceded by Ian Paisley	Leader of the Democratic Unionist Party in the House of Commons; 2010–present	Incumbent
Northern Ireland Forum
New forum	Member of the Northern Ireland Forum for North Belfast; 1996–1998	Forum dissolved
Northern Ireland Assembly
New assembly	Member of the Legislative Assembly for Belfast North; 1998–2010	Succeeded by William Humphrey
Political offices
New office	Minister for Social Development; 1999–2000	Succeeded by Maurice Morrow
Preceded by Maurice Morrow	Minister for Social Development; 2001–2002	Vacant Office suspended Title next held by Margaret Ritchie
Vacant Office suspended Title last held by Reg Empey	Minister of Enterprise, Trade and Investment; 2007–2008	Succeeded by Arlene Foster
Preceded by Peter Robinson	Minister of Finance and Personnel; 2008–2009	Succeeded by Sammy Wilson
Parliament of the United Kingdom
Preceded by Cecil Walker	Member of Parliament for Belfast North; 2001–2019	Succeeded by John Finucane
Orders of precedence in the United Kingdom
Preceded by The Lord Davies of Brixton	Gentlemen; Baron Dodds of Duncairn	Followed by The Lord Hammond of Runneymede
