= Frank Millar (politician, born 1925) =

Northern Irish unionist politician

Deputy Lord Mayor of Belfast
- In office 1992–1993
- In office 1981–1982

Member of Belfast City Council
- In office 15 May 1985 – 19 May 1993
- Preceded by: District created
- Succeeded by: David Browne
- Constituency: Castle
- In office 30 May 1973 – 15 May 1985
- Preceded by: District created
- Succeeded by: District abolished
- Constituency: Belfast Area H
- In office 1972 – 30 May 1973
- Succeeded by: District abolished
- Constituency: Belfast Dock

Member of the Northern Ireland Assembly for North Belfast
- In office 20 October 1982 – 1986
- In office 1973–1974

Member of the Constitutional Convention for North Belfast
- In office 1975–1976

Personal details
- Born: 1925 Belfast, Northern Ireland
- Died: 13 May 2001 (aged 75–76)
- Party: Independent Unionist (from 1975); Ulster Unionist (until 1975)
- Other political affiliations: Ulster Protestant Action (1956–1966)

Frank Millar (1925 – 13 May 2001) was a Northern Irish unionist politician.

== Background ==
Millar worked in the shipyards, where he became a shop steward, before becoming a founder member of Ulster Protestant Action in 1956.

Millar was first elected to Belfast City Council in 1972, representing Dock, then the Antrim and Shore Road areas. He held his seat at each subsequent election until retiring in 1993. He was Deputy Lord Mayor of Belfast in 1981–2 and 1992–3.

Millar was also elected to the Northern Ireland Assembly in 1973 for Belfast North as an Ulster Unionist Party anti-Sunningdale Agreement candidate. He held his seat on the Northern Ireland Constitutional Convention in 1975 as an independent Unionist, and for the 1982 Northern Ireland Assembly.

In 1986, Millar was fined £100 for describing supporters of Cliftonville F.C. as "Republican bastards". Two years later, he called for Irish Travellers to be "incinerated", while in 1989, he was fined £50 for punching Democratic Unionist Party councillor Sammy Wilson. He also faced criticism for describing Nelson Mandela as a "black Provo", and gay people as "deviants".

In the late 1980s, Millar campaigned against the privatisation of the Harland & Wolff shipyard.

Millar's son, Frank Millar Jr, was also an Ulster Unionist Party Assembly member.

Northern Ireland Assembly (1973)
New assembly	Assembly Member for North Belfast; 1973–1974	Assembly abolished
Northern Ireland Constitutional Convention
New convention	Member for North Belfast; 1975–1976	Convention dissolved
Northern Ireland Assembly (1982)
New assembly	MPA for North Belfast; 1982–1986	Assembly abolished
Civic offices
Vacant Title last held by Dorothy Dunlop	Deputy Lord Mayor of Belfast; 1981–1982	Succeeded by Ted Ashby
Preceded by Herbert Ditty	Deputy Lord Mayor of Belfast; 1992–1993	Succeeded by Hugh Smyth
