= Belfast North (Assembly constituency) =

Constituency in the Northern Ireland Assembly

Coordinates: 54°38′24″N 5°57′09″W

- Constituency for the Northern Ireland Assembly
- North Belfast shown within Northern Ireland

Current Constituency
- Created: 1973
- Seats: 5 (1982–1998, 2017–present); 6 (1973–1982, 1998–2017)
- MLAs: Phillip Brett (DUP); Gerry Kelly (SF); Brian Kingston (DUP); Nuala McAllister (APNI); Carál Ní Chuilín (SF)
- City council: Belfast City Council

Belfast North is a constituency in the Northern Ireland Assembly.

It was first used for a Northern Ireland-only election in 1973, which elected the then Northern Ireland Assembly. It usually shares boundaries with the Belfast North UK Parliament constituency. However, the boundaries of the two constituencies were slightly different from 1973 to 1974, 1983 to 1986 and 2010 to 2011 (because the Assembly boundaries had not caught up with Parliamentary boundary changes) and from 1996 to 1997, when members of the Northern Ireland Forum had been elected from the newly drawn Parliamentary constituencies but the 51st Parliament of the United Kingdom, elected in 1992 under the 1983–95 constituency boundaries, was still in session.

Members were then elected from the constituency to the 1975 Constitutional Convention, the 1982 Assembly, the 1996 Forum and then to the current Assembly from 1998.

For further details of the history and boundaries of the constituency, see Belfast North (UK Parliament constituency).

== Members ==
Election	MLA (party)	MLA (party)	MLA (party)	MLA (party)	MLA (party)	MLA (party)
1973	Gerry Fitt (SDLP)	Lloyd Hall-Thompson (UUP/UPNI)	John Ferguson (Alliance Party)	William Morgan (UUP)	Frank Millar (UUP/Independent Unionist)	John McQuade (DUP)
1975	Gerry Fitt (SDLP)	Lloyd Hall-Thompson (UUP/UPNI)	Billy Bell (UUP)	William Morgan (UUP)	Frank Millar (UUP/Independent Unionist)	William Annon (DUP)
1982	Paschal O'Hare (SDLP)	5 seats 1982–1998	Paul Maguire (Alliance Party)	John Carson (UUP)	Frank Millar (UUP/Independent Unionist)	George Seawright (DUP)
1996	Gerry Kelly (Sinn Féin)	5 seats 1982–1998	Alban Maginness (SDLP)	David Browne (UUP)	Billy Snoddy (DUP)	Nigel Dodds (DUP)
1998	Gerry Kelly (Sinn Féin)	Billy Hutchinson (PUP)	Alban Maginness (SDLP)	Fred Cobain (UUP)	Fraser Agnew (Independent; Unionist)	Nigel Dodds (DUP)
2003	Gerry Kelly (Sinn Féin)	Kathy Stanton (Sinn Féin)	Alban Maginness (SDLP)	Fred Cobain (UUP)	Nelson McCausland (DUP)	Nigel Dodds (DUP)
2007	Gerry Kelly (Sinn Féin)	Carál Ní Chuilín (Sinn Féin)	Alban Maginness (SDLP)	Fred Cobain (UUP)	Nelson McCausland (DUP)	Nigel Dodds (DUP)
September 2010 co-option	Gerry Kelly (Sinn Féin)	Carál Ní Chuilín (Sinn Féin)	Alban Maginness (SDLP)	Fred Cobain (UUP)	Nelson McCausland (DUP)	William Humphrey (DUP)
2011	Gerry Kelly (Sinn Féin)	Carál Ní Chuilín (Sinn Féin)	Alban Maginness (SDLP)	Paula Bradley (DUP)	Nelson McCausland (DUP)	William Humphrey (DUP)
2016	Gerry Kelly (Sinn Féin)	Carál Ní Chuilín (Sinn Féin)	Nichola Mallon (SDLP)	Paula Bradley (DUP)	Nelson McCausland (DUP)	William Humphrey (DUP)
2017	Gerry Kelly (Sinn Féin)	Carál Ní Chuilín (Sinn Féin)	Nichola Mallon (SDLP)	Paula Bradley (DUP)	5 seats 2017–present	William Humphrey (DUP)
2022	Gerry Kelly (Sinn Féin)	Carál Ní Chuilín (Sinn Féin)	Nuala McAllister (Alliance Party)	Phillip Brett (DUP)	5 seats 2017–present	Brian Kingston (DUP)

Note: The columns in this table are used only for presentational purposes, and no significance should be attached to the order of columns. For details of the order in which seats were won at each election, see the detailed results of that election.

== Elections ==
=== Northern Ireland Assembly ===
==== 2027 ====
2027 Assembly election: Belfast North – 5 seats
Party	Candidate	FPv%	Count
Party	Candidate	FPv%	1
Aontú	Aiden Carlin		
Sinn Féin	Gerry Kelly		
Sinn Féin	Carál Ní Chuilín		
Sinn Féin	Maighread Ní Chonghaile		
Green (NI)	Mal O'Hara		
SDLP	Carl Whyte		

==== 2022 ====
2022 Assembly election: Belfast North – 5 seats
Party	Candidate	FPv%	Count										
Party	Candidate	FPv%	1	2	3	4	5	6	7	8	9	10	11
Sinn Féin	**Gerry Kelly**	18.24%	**8,395**										
Sinn Féin	**Carál Ní Chuilín**	17.23%	**7,932**										
DUP	**Phillip Brett**	13.75%	6,329	6,330	6,336	6,336	6,452	6,506	6,699	6,724	6,754	**7,719**	
DUP	**Brian Kingston**	10.52%	4,844	4,845	4,848	4,848	4,889	4,919	5,112	5,123	5,163	5,637	**8,407**
Alliance	**Nuala McAllister**	9.52%	4,381	4,503	4,528	4,565	4,590	4,638	4,647	4,832	5,747	6,362	**6,563**
SDLP	Nichola Mallon	7.83%	3,604	4,012	4,038	4,179	4,189	4,384	4,399	4,733	5,325	5,489	5,572
TUV	Ron McDowell	7.25%	3,335	3,335	3,339	3,339	3,429	3,445	3,669	3,677	3,701	4,261	
UUP	Julie-Anne Corr-Johnston	5.74%	2,643	2,644	2,652	2,652	2,730	2,736	2,887	2,927	2,995		
Green (NI)	Mal O'Hara	3.14%	1,446	1,510	1,536	1,570	1,603	1,644	1,651	2,088			
People Before Profit	Fiona Ferguson	2.30%	1,059	1,128	1,176	1,211	1,222	1,256	1,266				
PUP	Billy Hutchinson	1.66%	762	763	763	763	819	820					
Aontú	Seán Mac Niocaill	1.39%	640	668	674	684	690						
Independent	Stafford Ward	1.06%	489	490	495	496							
Workers' Party	Lily Kerr	0.37%	168	175									
Electorate: 75,801 Valid: 46,027 (60.72%) Spoilt: 769 Quota: 7,672 Turnout: 46,796 (61.74%)

==== 2017 ====
2017 Assembly election: Belfast North – 5 seats
Party	Candidate	FPv%	Count						
Party	Candidate	FPv%	1	2	3	4	5	6	7
DUP	**Paula Bradley**	11.65%	4,835	4,843	4,865	5,236	6,002	**8,458**	
DUP	**William Humphrey**	10.65%	4,418	4,423	4,429	4,937	5,260	**7,276**	
SDLP	**Nichola Mallon**	13.09%	5,431	5,573	6,076	6,125	6,662	6,692	**6,806**
Sinn Féin	**Gerry Kelly**	15.13%	6,275	6,329	6,572	6,582	6,591	6,593	**6,595**
Sinn Féin	**Carál Ní Chuilín**	14.29%	5,929	5,983	6,151	6,155	6,158	6,158	**6,164**
Alliance	Nuala McAllister	8.41%	3,487	3,799	4,354	4,515	5,257	5,296	5,608
DUP	Nelson McCausland	9.78%	4,056	4,069	4,079	4,372	4,709		
UUP	Robert Foster	5.83%	2,418	2,457	2,517	3,141			
PUP	Julie-Anne Corr-Johnston	4.95%	2,053	2,103	2,174				
People Before Profit	Fiona Ferguson	3.76%	1,559	1,849					
Green (NI)	Mal O'Hara	1.72%	711						
Workers' Party	Gemma Weir	0.60%	248						
Independent	Adam Millar	0.16%	66						
Electorate: 68,187 Valid: 41,486 (60.84%) Spoilt: 633 Quota: 6,915 Turnout: 42,119 (61.77%)

==== 2016 ====
2016 Assembly election: Belfast North – 6 seats
Party	Candidate	FPv%	Count										
Party	Candidate	FPv%	1	2	3	4	5	6	7	8	9	10	11
Sinn Féin	**Gerry Kelly**	15.57%	**5,695**										
DUP	**Paula Bradley**	12.55%	4,591	4,591.72	4,598.72	4,600.72	4,607.72	4,658.72	4,883.72	4,897.72	5,053.72	5,080.8	**5,908.88**
DUP	**William Humphrey**	11.22%	4,105	4,105.16	4,113.16	4,115.16	4,116.24	4,221.24	4,326.24	4,335.24	4,760.32	4,781.4	**5,286.4**
DUP	**Nelson McCausland**	11.17%	4,087	4,087.16	4,092.16	4,104.16	4,115.16	4,205.16	4,279.16	4,290.16	4,555.24	4,561.24	**4,979.24**
Sinn Féin	**Carál Ní Chuilín**	10.96%	4,009	4,358.28	4,360.36	4,391.56	4,436.44	4,436.52	4,438.52	4,545.24	4,547.24	4,904.24	**4,911.24**
SDLP	**Nichola Mallon**	10.57%	3,866	3,933.44	3,940.52	4,029.32	4,134.12	4,138.36	4,160.44	4,268.84	4,279.92	4,748.48	**4,847.48**
Alliance	Nuala McAllister	7.02%	2,569	2,580.52	2,590.52	2,633.6	2,709.76	2,709.76	2,733.84	3,067	3,091	3,481.64	3,835.8
UUP	Lesley Carroll	5.39%	1,972	1,972.32	1,984.32	1,986.32	1,990.32	2,083.32	2,266.32	2,291.32	2,727.32	2,782.32	
People Before Profit	Fiona Ferguson	3.52%	1,286	1,293.68	1,318.68	1,397.48	1,507.28	1,508.36	1,545.44	1,798.76	1,832.76		
PUP	Billy Hutchinson	3.38%	1,238	1,238.32	1,240.32	1,244.32	1,251.32	1,340.32	1,509.32	1,523.32			
Green (NI)	Mal O'Hara	2.18%	796	798.64	810.64	858.8	960.8	967.8	996.8				
UKIP	Ken Boyle	2.05%	751	751.24	757.24	764.32	771.32	954.32					
TUV	John Miller	1.76%	644	644.56	645.56	646.56	650.56						
Workers' Party	Gemma Weir	1.30%	476	478.8	482.8	520.8							
Independent	Fra Hughes	0.66%	243	246.44	255.52								
NI Labour	Abdo Thabeth	0.35%	127	127.4	128.4								
Independent	Tom Burns	0.24%	87	87.24									
Northern Ireland First	Geoff Dowey	0.08%	32	32									
Electorate: 70,872 Valid: 36,574 (51.61%) Spoilt: 619 Quota: 5,225 Turnout: 37,193 (52.48%)

==== 2011 ====
2011 Assembly election: Belfast North – 6 seats
Party	Candidate	FPv%	Count						
Party	Candidate	FPv%	1	2	3	4	5	6	7
Sinn Féin	**Gerry Kelly**	19.94%	**6,674**						
DUP	**Nelson McCausland**	15.54%	**5,200**						
SDLP	**Alban Maginness**	12.03%	4,025	4,261.6	4,357.44	4,359.76	4,562.8	**5,004.32**	
Sinn Féin	**Carál Ní Chuilín**	8.96%	2,999	3,939.24	3,976.08	3,976.24	4,061.48	**4,868.48**	
DUP	**William Humphrey**	11.13%	3,724	3,725.4	3,734.4	3,998.4	4,159.36	4,165.72	**4,331.76**
DUP	**Paula Bradley**	10.42%	3,488	3,493.6	3,500.6	3,591.24	3,728.4	3,735.04	**4,065.2**
UUP	Fred Cobain	8.24%	2,758	2,760.8	2,766.8	2,803.76	2,991.4	2,993.52	3,622.68
Alliance	Billy Webb	6.26%	2,096	2,113.08	2,168.36	2,173.48	2,395.6	2,458.16	
Sinn Féin	J. J. Magee	2.98%	998	1,571.16	1,610.68	1,611.08	1,672.6		
Independent	Raymond McCord	3.51%	1,176	1,205.96	1,269.32	1,279.88			
Workers' Party	John Lavery	0.99%	332	363.08					
Electorate: 68,119 Valid: 33,470 (49.14%) Spoilt: 810 Quota: 4,782 Turnout: 34,280 (50.32%)

==== 2007 ====
2007 Assembly election: Belfast North – 6 seats
Party	Candidate	FPv%	Count									
Party	Candidate	FPv%	1	2	3	4	5	6	7	8	9	10
DUP	**Nigel Dodds**	23.47%	**6,973**									
Sinn Féin	**Gerry Kelly**	18.22%	**5,414**									
Sinn Féin	**Carál Ní Chuilín**	12.38%	3,680	3,680.39	**4,586.54**							
SDLP	**Alban Maginness**	7.44%	2,212	2,222.53	2,341.18	2,481.58	2,530.04	2,530.92	2,806.41	3,099.12	**4,830.12**	
UUP	**Fred Cobain**	8.41%	2,498	2,766.71	2,768.39	2,770.09	2,778.09	2,888.79	3,078.64	3,414.96	3,574.43	**3,967.43**
DUP	**Nelson McCausland**	8.29%	2,462	3,412.43	3,412.64	3,412.84	3,414.23	3,515.78	3,560.22	3,763.62	3,783.47	**3,818.47**
DUP	William Humphrey	5.63%	1,673	2,996.27	2,997.11	2,997.31	2,999.48	3,085.86	3,123.64	3,287.36	3,303.66	3,326.66
SDLP	Pat Convery	6.29%	1,868	1,873.07	1,928.72	2,010.82	2,028.57	2,030.96	2,267.04	2,485.12		
Independent	Raymond McCord	4.44%	1,320	1,387.86	1,410.75	1,461.85	1,487.75	1,538.57	1,744.5			
Green (NI)	Peter Emerson	1.99%	590	605.6	615.05	642.65	702.11	720.5				
Alliance	Thomas McCullough	1.64%	486	494.19	497.13	500.13	512.26	525.43				
UK Unionist	Robert McCartney	1.21%	360	413.82	414.03	414.23	415.62					
Workers' Party	John Lavery	0.47%	139	141.34	152.05	158.25						
Make Politicians History	Rainbow George	0.13%	40	41.17	41.59	43.59						
Electorate: 49,372 Valid: 29,715 (60.19%) Spoilt: 352 Quota: 4,246 Turnout: 30,067 (60.90%)

==== 2003 ====
2003 Assembly election: Belfast North – 6 seats
Party	Candidate	FPv%	Count											
Party	Candidate	FPv%	1	2	3	4	5	6	7	8	9	10	11	12
DUP	**Nigel Dodds**	29.42%	**9,276**											
Sinn Féin	**Gerry Kelly**	17.52%	**5,524**											
DUP	**Nelson McCausland**	4.76%	1,500	**5,100.6**										
UUP	**Fred Cobain**	9.39%	2,961	3,338.91	3,339.27	3,509.46	3,514.64	3,538.98	3,607.77	3,696.29	3,901.5	**4,555.5**		
SDLP	**Alban Maginness**	10.10%	3,186	3,199.26	3,310.68	3,312.93	3,322.93	3,349.93	3,365.8	3,436.54	3,444.08	3,667.1	3,675.47	**5,569.47**
Sinn Féin	**Kathy Stanton**	9.48%	2,990	2,990	3,803.78	3,803.87	3,812.87	3,832.92	3,838.28	3,841.64	3,841.82	3,895.44	3,896.37	**4,118.43**
PUP	Billy Hutchinson	4.31%	1,358	1,687.46	1,688.36	1,811.12	1,818.65	1,836.44	1,874.28	1,887.57	2,087.42	2,491.95	2,526.36	2,605.05
SDLP	Pat Convery	6.69%	2,108	2,113.61	2,158.79	2,160.5	2,183.68	2,213.22	2,228.4	2,272.76	2,279.36	2,480.46	2,486.97	
Ind. Unionist	Fraser Agnew	2.54%	802	1,000.39	1,000.39	1,157.44	1,157.53	1,168.27	1,217.64	1,234.62	1,335.22			
NI Women's Coalition	Elizabeth McCullough	1.48%	467	478.22	482.36	485.6	498.2	573.16	585.57	693.55	702.24			
Independent	Frank McCoubrey	1.49%	469	551.62	551.98	618.58	618.76	620.85	676.53	682.53				
Alliance	Marjorie Hawkins	0.97%	305	313.67	315.29	318.35	325.86	370.15	383.33					
Independent	Raymond McCord	0.69%	218	284.81	286.61	325.13	329.82	340.69						
Green (NI)	Peter Emerson	0.83%	261	269.16	271.5	277.89	299.4							
Workers' Party	Marcella Delaney	0.29%	90	91.02	91.2	91.92								
Rainbow Dream Ticket	John Gallagher	0.05%	17	19.55	19.55	19.91								
Electorate: 51,353 Valid: 31,532 (61.40%) Spoilt: 465 Quota: 4,505 Turnout: 31,997 (62.31%)

==== 1998 ====
1998 Assembly election: Belfast North – 6 seats
Party	Candidate	FPv%	Count										
Party	Candidate	FPv%	1	2	3	4	5	6	7	8	9	10	11
DUP	**Nigel Dodds**	18.18%	**7,476**										
SDLP	**Alban Maginness**	15.07%	**6,196**										
Sinn Féin	**Gerry Kelly**	13.64%	5,610	5,610.42	5,641.07	5,709.77	5,709.77	5,709.77	5,719.42	5,724.52	5,730.73	**8,792.73**	
PUP	**Billy Hutchinson**	9.12%	3,751	3,832.48	3,835.18	3,941.63	4,012.82	4,399.74	4,639	4,928.33	5,465.43	5,477.88	**5,516.88**
UUP	**Fred Cobain**	5.87%	2,415	2,474.22	2,474.82	2,508.55	2,582.52	2,691.35	2,862.6	4,534.04	5,110.93	5,110.98	**5,113.98**
Ind. Unionist	**Fraser Agnew**	7.24%	2,976	3,071.34	3,071.64	3,102.26	3,288.51	3,370.55	3,529.21	3,847.08	4,964.21	4,965.31	**4,971.31**
SDLP	Martin Morgan	5.99%	2,465	2,465.42	2,713.47	2,896.82	2,898.03	2,900.08	3,316.48	3,339.93	3,352.19	3,439.79	4,681.79
Sinn Féin	Martina McIlkenny	7.70%	3,165	3,165	3,171.95	3,197.5	3,197.5	3,197.5	3,208.95	3,209.95	3,210.16		
DUP	Eric Smyth	3.13%	1,288	2,382.1	2,382.15	2,410.3	2,852.5	3,053	3,082	3,185			
UUP	David Browne	5.02%	2,064	2,111.88	2,112.43	2,154.58	2,197.04	2,282.77	2,551.59				
Alliance	Glyn Roberts	3.08%	1,267	1,272.88	1,280.83	1,444.1	1,456.36	1,473.36					
Ulster Democratic	John White	2.22%	911	943.34	943.44	956.75	974.43						
UK Unionist	Stephen Cooper	1.82%	748	876.94	876.94	899.62							
Green (NI)	Peter Emerson	0.62%	257	259.94	261.79								
Labour Party NI	Sam McAughtry	0.62%	255	256.89	261.64								
Workers' Party	Stephen Doran	0.38%	155	155.84	157.64								
Natural Law	Kevin Blair	0.18%	76	78.1	78.55								
Independent	Dolores Quinn	0.12%	50	50.42	51.42								
Electorate: 62,541 Valid: 41,125 (65.76%) Spoilt: 941 Quota: 5,876 Turnout: 42,066 (67.26%)

=== 1996 forum ===
Successful candidates are shown in bold.

Party	Candidate(s)	Votes	Percentage
DUP	**Nigel Dodds**; **Billy Snoddy**; David Smylie; William Henry De Courcy	7,778	19.2
Sinn Féin	**Gerry Kelly**; Joe Austin; Christine Beattie; Bobby Lavery; Eoghan McCormain	7,681	19.0
SDLP	**Alban Maginness**; Martin Morgan; Geraldine Leonard; Shelagh McGlade; Peter Coll	7,493	18.5
UUP	**David Browne**; Fred Cobain; Nelson McCausland; Dennis Robinson	6,938	17.2
PUP	Billy Hutchinson; Michael Acheson; Robert Gourley	3,777	9.3
Ulster Democratic	John White^{*} Thomas English; Thomasena Livingstone; Patrick Bird; John English	1,874	4.6
Alliance	Nicholas Whyte; Tommy Frazer; Lindsay Whitcroft	1,670	4.1
UK Unionist	Derek Peters; Amy Corry	1,329	3.3
Labour coalition	Mark Langhammer; Marion Morrison; Kevin Lawrence; Martin Stroud; John Simpson	571	1.4
NI Women's Coalition	Brenda Callaghan; Lynda Walker; Eileen Calder; Roisin O'Hagan; Freda Brown	486	1.2
Workers' Party	Margaret Smith; Paul Treanor	274	0.7
Green (NI)	Peter Emerson; Rosemary Warren	265	0.7
Democratic Left	Seamus Lynch; John McLaughlin	123	0.4
Independent Voice	Andrew Thompson; Sarah Thompson	63	0.2
Ulster Independence	Norman McClelland; David Kerr	41	0.1
Independent McMullan	Wesley Holmes; Helen Craig; Stanley Simons	25	0.1
Independent Chambers	Joe Coggle; Sally Irvine	21	0.1

^{*}John White was elected as one of the 20 top-up candidates for Northern Ireland.

=== 1982 Northern Ireland Assembly ===
1982 Assembly election: Belfast North – 5 seats
Party	Candidate	FPv%	Count													
Party	Candidate	FPv%	1	2	3	4	5	6	7	8	9	10	11	12	13	14
UUP	**John Carson**	21.82%	**7,798**													
DUP	**George Seawright**	13.79%	4,929	5,012.26	5,026.41	5,026.41	5,044.1	5,076.32	5,150.77	5,359.74	5,673.33	5,675.33	**6,119.08**			
Ind. Unionist	**Frank Millar**	5.73%	2,047	2,285.05	2,319.57	2,319.57	2,341.26	2,410.98	2,539.42	2,813.48	3,055.82	3,059.82	4,101.12	4,182.79	**6,322.79**	
SDLP	**Paschal O'Hare**	8.93%	3,190	3,191.38	3,191.38	3,255.38	3,290.61	3,290.61	3,294.84	3,295.84	3,295.84	4,197.84	4,201.76	5,031.45	5,140.9	**5,078.9**
Alliance	**Paul Maguire**	7.07%	2,527	2,564.95	2,568.95	2,581.95	2,693.02	2,698.94	2,877.08	2,906	2,935.69	3,205.15	3,420.99	4,325.74	4,476.91	**4,756.91**
Sinn Féin	Joe Austin	11.27%	4,029	4,029.46	4,029.46	4,088.46	4,104.69	4,104.69	4,107.69	4,107.69	4,113.69	4,188.69	4,188.92	4,556.92	4,564.3	4,573.3
DUP	William Gault	7.33%	2,618	2,730.93	2,752.31	2,752.31	2,763.69	2,801.59	2,854.5	3,023.41	3,259.41	3,261.41	3,646.57	3,689.18		
Workers' Party	Seamus Lynch	7.04%	2,516	2,526.12	2,531.35	2,556.35	2,634.81	2,641.73	2,706.8	2,718.03	2,758.41	2,928.41	2,961.92			
UUP	Peter Smith	2.75%	984	1,954.83	1,965.82	1,967.28	1,987.12	2,323.84	2,413.28	2,635.96	2,745.02	2,745.25				
SDLP	Alban Maginness	3.73%	1,333	1,334.15	1,335.07	1,450.07	1,474.07	1,474.07	1,479.07	1,480.07	1,483.07					
Ulster Democratic	Sammy Doyle	2.49%	890	938.99	1,022.91	1,023.91	1,029.91	1,041.52	1,135.43	1,187.27						
UUUP	Nelson McCausland	2.40%	858	922.86	940.77	940.77	948.15	956.22	1,014.44							
Independent	Billy Boyd	2.08%	745	778.12	782.35	783.35	822.73	823.65								
UUP	Raymond Trimble	1.03%	369	508.61	517.76	518.76	525.22									
Ecology	Peter Emerson	1.15%	412	423.27	424.5	424.5										
People's Democracy	Fergus O'Hare	0.83%	298	298.46	298.46											
Ulster Democratic	Bill Lavery	0.55%	196	215.32												
Electorate: 62,391 Valid: 35,739 (57.28%) Spoilt: 1,166 Quota: 5,957 Turnout: 36,905 (59.15%)

=== 1975 Constitutional Convention ===
1975 Constitutional Convention: Belfast North – 6 seats
Party	Candidate	FPv%	Count									
Party	Candidate	FPv%	1	2	3	4	5	6	7	8	9	10
SDLP	**Gerry Fitt**	14.80%	**6,454**									
UUP	**Billy Bell**	14.37%	**6,268**									
Ind. Unionist	**Frank Millar**	13.04%	5,687	5,687.39	5,687.39	5,692.39	5,683.39	5,944.39	**6,634.39**			
UUP	**William Morgan**	12.75%	5,558	5,558.12	5,558.12	5,570.12	5,667.12	5,758.15	6,223.15	**6,427.13**		
Unionist Party NI	**Lloyd Hall-Thompson**	8.20%	3,577	3,577.69	3,577.69	3,601.72	3,618.72	3,665.81	3,741.81	3,761.03	4,223.06	**5,870.28**
DUP	**William Annon**	9.48%	4,132	4,132.09	4,132.09	4,138.09	4,219.09	4,271.12	4,972.12	5,127.12	5,603.35	**5,799.62**
SDLP	Thomas Donnelly	8.25%	3,596	3,772.07	3,772.07	3,793.76	3,793.76	4,107.85	4,110.91	4,112.15	4,213.21	5,123.9
Alliance	John Ferguson	5.06%	2,207	2,214.32	2,214.32	2,603.62	2,610.65	2,685.25	2,706.25	2,709.97	3,624.39	
NI Labour	Billy Boyd	4.01%	1,749	1,750.44	1,750.44	1,775.5	1,786.5	2,359.83	2,423.89	2,440.63		
Vanguard	Bill Lavery	4.32%	1,884	1,884.18	1,884.18	1,889.18	1,988.18	2,057.21				
NI Labour	John Stewart	2.06%	898	898.54	898.54	924.75	947.75					
Republican Clubs	Seamus Lynch	1.27%	556	559.69	559.69	560.75	564.78					
Ind. Unionist	Noel Trimble	1.20%	525	525.03	525.03	526.06						
Alliance	James Robinson	1.19%	518	519.41	519.41							
Electorate: 70,673 Valid: 43,609 (61.71%) Spoilt: 1,130 Quota: 6,230 Turnout: 44,739 (63.30%)

=== 1973 Assembly election ===
1973 Assembly election: Belfast North – 6 seats
Party	Candidate	FPv%	Count														
Party	Candidate	FPv%	1	2	3	4	5	6	7	8	9	10	11	12	13	14	15
SDLP	**Gerry Fitt**	16.27%	**8,264**														
DUP	**John McQuade**	10.14%	5,148	5,148.24	5,285.24	5,313.24	5,316.26	5,318.28	5,595.48	5,612.48	7,091.72	7,185.72	**8,844.72**				
UUP	**Lloyd Hall-Thompson**	11.21%	5,694	5,695.68	5,705.68	5,725.68	5,743.8	5,744.8	5,762.8	5,789.04	5,824.04	5,965.28	6,100.28	6,180.28	6,199.48	**9,387.48**	
UUP	**William Morgan**	10.22%	5,190	5,190.24	5,197.36	5,229.48	5,243.48	5,243.6	5,264.6	5,287.8	5,351.6	5,464.72	5,549.72	5,679.72	5,687.72	6,192.96	**7,273.48**
UUP	**Frank Millar**	8.24%	4,187	4,187.12	4,238.12	4,253.12	4,261.24	4,262.24	4,330.36	4,337.36	4,568.36	4,621.36	4,963.48	5,711.48	5,723.56	6,070.4	**6,521.92**
Alliance	**John Ferguson**	3.86%	1,958	1,983.2	1,986.2	2,023.56	2,261.12	2,269.96	2,271.96	3,133.72	3,141.72	4,171.76	4,218	4,230	6,047.68	6,110.8	**6,146.16**
UUP	Cecil Walker	8.57%	4,354	4,354.36	4,371.36	4,415.36	4,424.36	4,424.36	4,432.36	4,451.36	4,450.36	4,698.08	4,805.08	4,974.08	4,994.32	5,503.56	6,058.44
UUP	Wilson Gamble	8.19%	4,161	4,161.96	4,165.96	4,167.96	4,176.96	4,177.96	4,191.96	4,205.96	4,225.96	4,278.2	4,557.32	4,667.32	4,681.76		
SDLP	Thomas Donnelly	3.66%	1,861	2,673.4	2,673.52	2,676.88	2,687.52	3,104.4	3,104.52	3,154.76	3,156	3,637	3,667.12	3,667.12			
Vanguard	William Baillie	3.66%	1,859	1,859.72	2,016.72	2,022.72	2,023.72	2,025.84	2,509.84	2,512.96	2,808.96	2,835.96					
NI Labour	Vivian Simpson	3.43%	1,742	1,802.6	1,802.6	2,111.2	2,151.4	2,255.08	2,258.08	2,357.8	2,381.8						
DUP	Fred Proctor	4.16%	2,112	2,112.48	2,176.48	2,196.6	2,200.6	2,205.6	2,265.6	2,278.6							
Alliance	Jack Smith	1.46%	742	761.32	764.32	793.44	1,138.2	1,151.6	1,151.6								
Vanguard	Billy Hull	1.68%	852	852.24	953.24	961.24	961.24	962.24									
Republican Clubs	Seamus Lynch	1.68%	854	898.04	898.04	899.04	900.12										
Alliance	Keith Jones	1.33%	675	688.08	689.08	704.08											
NI Labour	John Stewart	1.12%	571	572.92	573.92												
Ind. Unionist	Tommy Lyttle	1.10%	560	560.24													
Electorate: 75,768 (67.03%) Valid: 50,784 Spoilt: 1,286 Quota: 7,255 Turnout: 52,070 (68.72%)
