= Dividers (sculpture) =

Coordinates: 54.60592°N 5.9201°W

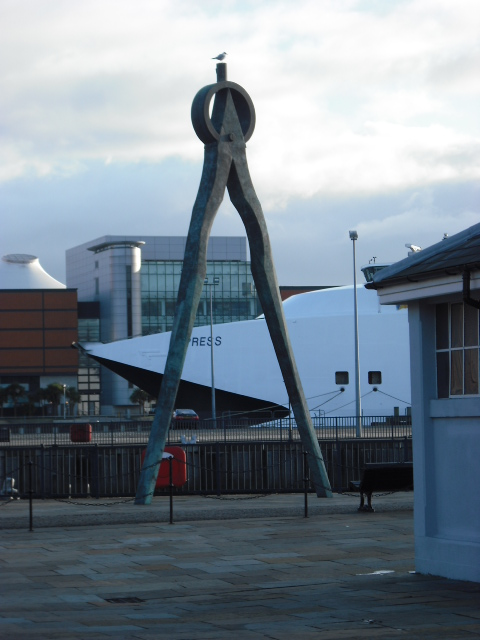
Dividers, December 2009

Dividers is an outdoor sculpture located at Clarendon Dock, on the River Lagan, Belfast, Northern Ireland. It was produced in 2002 by artist Vivien Burnside and is an 8.3m tall set of dividers made of bronze with a stainless steel core. It was funded by Laganside Corporation, Belfast Harbour Commissioners and the National Lottery through the Arts Council of Northern Ireland.
