= 1981 Belfast City Council election =

Northern Ireland local election

← 1977	20 May 1981	1985 →

All 51 seats to Belfast City Council 26 seats needed for a majority
	First party	Second party	Third party
Party	DUP	UUP	Alliance
Seats won	15	13	7
Seat change	▲8	▼2	▼6
	Fourth party	Fifth party	Sixth party
Party	SDLP	People's Democracy	Irish Republican Socialist
Seats won	6	2	2
Seat change	▼2	▲2	▲2
	Seventh party	Eighth party	Ninth party
Party	PUP	Ulster Democratic	Unionist Party NI
Seats won	1	1	1
Seat change	▲1	▲1	▼1
Lord Mayor before election
John Carson
UUP
Lord Mayor
Grace Bannister
UUP

Elections to Belfast City Council were held on 20 May 1981 on the same day as the other Northern Irish local government elections. The election used nine district electoral areas to elect a total of 51 councillors, most representing the more heavily populated north and west.

The DUP became the largest party, overtaking the UUP, while Grace Bannister from the UUP became the first female Lord Mayor.

== Election results ==
Belfast local election result 1981
Party	Seats	Gains	Losses	Net gain/loss	Seats %	Votes %	Votes	+/−
DUP	15	8	0	▲8	29.4	25.8	33,433	▲12.5
UUP	13	1	3	▼2	25.5	23.7	30,685	▼3.1
Alliance	7	0	6	▼6	13.7	13.2	17,164	▼5.4
SDLP	6	0	2	▼2	11.8	14.1	18,227	▼4.5
People's Democracy	2	2	0	▲2	3.9	3.7	4,734	New
Irish Republican Socialist	2	2	0	▲2	3.9	2.6	3,418	New
Ulster Democratic	1	1	0	▲1	0.0	2.3	2,989	New
PUP	1	1	0.0	▲1	2.0	1.9	2,434	New
Unionist Party NI	1	0	1	▼1	2.0	2.2	2,859	▼2.8
Ind. Unionist	1	0	1	▼1	2.0	1.9	2,540	▼2.2
Ind. Socialist	1	1	0	▲1	2.0	1.5	1,884	▲1.4
Anti H-Block	1	1	0	▲1	2.0	0.8	1,070	New
Republican Clubs	0	0	3	▼3	0.0	3.9	4,993	▼0.8
NI Labour	0	0	0	0	0.0	1.4	1,824	▼1.2
Independent	0	0	1	▼1	0.0	0.7	933	▼2.5
UPUP	0	0	0	0	0.0	0.1	187	New
Ind. Nationalist	0	0	0	0	0.0	0.1	167	▲0.1
Communist	0	0	0	0	0.0	0.1	97	0.0

Note: "Votes" are the first preference votes.

== Districts summary ==
Results of the Belfast City Council election, 1981 by district
Ward	%	Cllrs	%	Cllrs	%	Cllrs	%	Cllrs	%	Cllrs	%	Cllrs	%	Cllrs	%	Cllrs	%	Cllrs	%	Cllrs	Total Cllrs
Ward	DUP		UUP		Alliance		SDLP		PD		IRSP		UDP		UPNI		PUP		Others		Total Cllrs
Area A	39.3	3	33.5	3	12.1	1	9.2	0	0.0	0	0.0	0	0.0	0	0.0	0	0.0	0	5.9	0	7
Area B	33.5	2	26.8	2	23.0	2	1.1	0	0.0	0	0.0	0	2.0	0	11.0	1	0.0	0	2.6	0	7
Area C	21.6	2	33.6	2	28.6	2	9.4	0	0.0	0	0.0	0	0.0	0	3.3	0	0.0	0	3.3	0	6
Area D	0.0	0	3.3	0	5.3	0	44.8	3	17.0	1	10.9	1	0.0	0	0.0	0	0.0	0	18.7	1	6
Area E	35.1	2	22.1	2	5.8	0	3.5	0	0.0	0	0.0	0	6.5	0	0.0	0	11.1	0	15.9	1	6
Area F	26.4	2	18.4	1	10.0	1	20.8	1	0.0	0	15.2	1	0.0	0	0.0	0	0.0	0	9.3	0	6
Area G	24.8	2	17.7	1	3.1	0	7.5	0	19.6	1	0.0	0	14.3	1	0.0	0	0.0	0	13.0	0	6
Area H	21.7	2	27.4	2	11.5	1	19.6	1	0.0	0	0.0	0	0.0	0	0.0	0	2.5	0	17.3	1	7
Total	25.8	15	23.7	13	13.2	7	14.1	6	3.7	2	2.6	2	2.3	1	2.2	1	1.9	1	10.5	3	51

== District results ==
=== Area A ===
1977: 2 x UUP, 2 x DUP, 2 x Alliance, 1 x SDLP
1981: 3 x DUP, 3 x UUP, 1 x Alliance
1977-1981 Change: DUP and UUP gain from Alliance and SDLP

Area A - 7 seats
Party	Candidate	FPv%	Count														
Party	Candidate	FPv%	1	2	3	4	5	6	7	8	9	10	11	12	13	14	15
DUP	John Foster	18.32%	3,333														
UUP	Jeremy Burchill	14.23%	2,589														
DUP	Raymond McCrea*	12.87%	2,342														
DUP	Sammy Wilson	8.13%	1,479	2,431.64													
UUP	Grace Bannister*	11.29%	2,055	2,081.88	2,202	2,265	2,285.64										
Alliance	Donnell Deeny	7.91%	1,439	1,440.92	1,447.52	1,449.41	1,450.05	1,460.09	1,464.57	1,477.81	1,553.17	1,560.49	1,645.85	1,657.44	2,463.44		
UUP	William Blair*	4.95%	900	918.56	1,024.64	1,054.7	1,067.14	1,072.27	1,101.76	1,211.3	1,250.36	1,250.36	1,258.63	1,742.86	1,793.34	1,936.94	1,944.62
SDLP	Alasdair McDonnell*	6.94%	1,262	1,263.6	1,263.84	1,264.02	1,264.34	1,272.66	1,272.66	1,273.66	1,291.66	1,660.75	1,856.1	1,856.27	1,889.76	1,932.16	1,932.16
Alliance	Mervyn Jones	4.21%	766	771.44	770.16	779.69	781.21	787.21	791.6	808.62	907.05	913.05	964.37	984.13			
UUP	Tony Wilkins	2.99%	544	569.28	611.76	634.26	645.94	650.19	669.27	721.95	733.24	734.24	736.33				
Republican Clubs	Francis Cullen	2.30%	418	419.28	419.52	419.88	419.88	445.01	446.33	446.76	467.3	483.3					
SDLP	Patrick McGourty	2.25%	410	410.64	410.76	410.85	410.89	412.89	412.89	412.89	419.98						
NI Labour	Derek Peters	1.52%	276	278.24	278.72	279.44	279.8	297.89	306.35	310.55							
UPUP	Benjamin Horan	1.03%	187	196.28	206.12	223.31	228.67	230.67	239.44								
Independent	John McKeague	0.54%	99	103.8	107.88	116.34	120.94	126.26									
Communist	James Stewart	0.25%	97	98.92	99.52	100.15	100.51										
Electorate: 31,215 Valid: 18,196 (58.29%) Spoilt: 937 Quota: 2,275 Turnout: 19,133 (61.29%)

=== Area B ===
1977: 3 x UUP, 2 x Alliance, 1 x DUP, 1 x UPNI
1981: 2 x DUP, 2 x UUP, 1 x Alliance, 1 x UPNI
1977-1981 Change: DUP gain from UUP

Area B - 7 seats
Party	Candidate	FPv%	Count									
Party	Candidate	FPv%	1	2	3	4	5	6	7	8	9	10
Alliance	Oliver Napier*	12.41%	2,631	2,719								
Alliance	Michael Brown*	7.55%	1,602	1,653	1,671	1,706.2	1,923	1,929	2,641.4			
DUP	Henry Evans*	11.85%	2,513	2,513	2,546	2,546	2,554	2,571	2,574	3,090		
DUP	Bill Morrison	10.15%	2,152	2,152	2,201	2,201	2,214	2,243	2,243	2,481	2,765.8	
UUP	Thomas Patton*	9.81%	2,081	2,081	2,195	2,195.8	2,264.8	2,411.8	2,418.8	2,443.8	2,450.92	2,839.92
Unionist Party NI	Joshua Cardwell*	10.97%	2,327	2,336	2,363	2,363.8	2,428.4	2,472.4	2,487.2	2,519.2	2,529.88	2,710.88
UUP	William Corry	8.17%	1,733	1,733	1,737	1,737	1,744	1,919	1,930	1,938	1,944.23	2,703.23
DUP	Samuel Foster	6.90%	1,464	1,465	1,521	1,521	1,525	1,535	1,537	1,695	1,808.92	1,865.92
UUP	Dorothy Dunlop*	5.88%	1,248	1,249	1,261	1,261	1,278	1,452	1,459	1,478	1,490.46	
DUP	Albert Greer	4.62%	979	979	1,009	1,009	1,018	1,026	1,026			
Alliance	Samuel Coulson	3.05%	647	660	663	683	784.6	792.6				
UUP	John Kennedy	2.89%	613	614	620	620	628					
NI Labour	David McKee	2.58%	548	587	602	611.6						
Ulster Democratic	Louis Scott	2.05%	434	439								
SDLP	Peter Prendiville	1.11%	236									
Electorate: 35,901 Valid: 21,208 (59.07%) Spoilt: 630 Quota: 2,652 Turnout: 21,838 (60.83%)

=== Area C ===
1977: 3 x Alliance, 2 x UUP, 1 x UPNI
1981: 2 x UUP, 2 x Alliance, 2 x DUP
1977-1981 Change: DUP (two seats) gain from Alliance and UPNI

Area C - 6 seats
Party	Candidate	FPv%	Count								
Party	Candidate	FPv%	1	2	3	4	5	6	7	8	9
Alliance	David Cook*	15.65%	2,493								
Alliance	Muriel Pritchard*	7.27%	1,158	1,217.52	1,280.08	1,347.72	1,362.88	2,376.96			
UUP	Andrew Cairns*	12.13%	1,933	1,937.32	1,942.32	2,166.88	2,187.88	2,202.84	2,835.84		
UUP	Mary Crooks*	13.18%	2,099	2,104.2	2,111.1	2,191.6	2,216.76	2,260.24	2,828.24		
DUP	Brian Gibson	9.43%	1,503	1,504.04	1,505.12	1,529.12	1,720.12	1,727.12	1,805.48	2,040.48	2,229.48
DUP	William Stevenson	7.62%	1,214	1,214.32	1,214.32	1,222.32	1,687.56	1,694.8	1,753.28	1,872.28	1,971.28
SDLP	Ben Caraher	9.42%	1,501	1,508.6	1,792.12	1,795.12	1,795.12	1,828.96	1,843.44	1,845.44	1,850.44
UUP	John Gilmore	8.32%	1,326	1,330.72	1,336.88	1,396.04	1,411.12	1,421			
Alliance	William Jeffrey*	5.73%	913	1,021	1,108.48	1,150.2	1,156.44				
DUP	Thomas McIntyre	4.58%	729	729.8	730.8	744.88					
Unionist Party NI	Victor Brennan*	3.34%	532	534.72	536.72						
Republican Clubs	Gerard Carr	3.33%	530	532.96							
Electorate: 28,354 Valid: 15,931 (56.19%) Spoilt: 529 Quota: 2,276 Turnout: 16,460 (58.05%)

=== Area D ===
1977: 4 x SDLP, 1 x Republican Clubs, 1 x Alliance
1981: 3 x SDLP, 1 x People's Democracy, 1 x IRSP, 1 x Independent Socialist
1977-1981 Change: People's Democracy and IRSP gain from Republican Clubs and Alliance, Independent Socialist leaves SDLP

Area D - 6 seats
Party	Candidate	FPv%	Count									
Party	Candidate	FPv%	1	2	3	4	5	6	7	8	9	10
SDLP	Joe Hendron	26.20%	4,291									
People's Democracy	John McAnulty	16.98%	2,781									
SDLP	Cormac Boomer*	12.64%	2,070	2,919.16								
SDLP	Mary Muldoon*	3.88%	636	987.44	1,143.37	1,148.3	1,166.98	1,187.34	1,191.34	1,917.48	1,937.84	2,262.01
Irish Republican Socialist	Gerry Kelly	5.84%	957	1,015.88	1,020.22	1,238.16	1,276.77	1,284.95	1,285.95	1,302.89	2,185.21	2,197.01
Ind. Socialist	Paddy Devlin*	8.20%	1,343	1,515.1	1,560.45	1,573.88	1,616	1,659.4	1,668.4	1,741.36	1,787.23	2,058.99
Republican Clubs	Mary McMahon	6.87%	1,125	1,176.52	1,185.2	1,193.87	1,211.85	1,546.39	1,547.39	1,604.52	1,628.3	1,738.82
Alliance	Dan McGuinness*	4.43%	725	781.12	795.69	797.22	883.01	895.93	1,064.93	1,108.6	1,116.83	
Irish Republican Socialist	William Browning	5.02%	822	846.84	854.9	1,012.49	1,041.67	1,046.52	1,049.52	1,066.12		
SDLP	Anne McElroy	2.11%	346	642.7	962.93	974.49	1,008.88	1,034.96	1,040.27			
UUP	John Hand	2.92%	538	538	538.31	538.48	555.48	558.48				
Republican Clubs	Kevin Smyth	2.67%	438	467.9	471.93	476.01	488.35					
Ind. Nationalist	Liam Hunter*	1.02%	167	189.54	192.95	200.77						
Alliance	Robert Turkington	0.84%	137	146.2	146.51	147.36						
Electorate: 35,812 Valid: 16,376 (45.73%) Spoilt: 1,060 Quota: 2,340 Turnout: 17,436 (48.69%)

=== Area E ===
1977: 2 x UUP, 1 x DUP, 1 x Alliance, 1 x Independent, 1 x Independent Unionist
1981: 2 x DUP, 2 x UUP, 1 x PUP, 1 x Anti H-Block
1977-1981 Change: DUP and Anti H-Block gain from Alliance and Independent, Independent Unionist joins PUP

Area E - 6 seats
Party	Candidate	FPv%	Count											
Party	Candidate	FPv%	1	2	3	4	5	6	7	8	9	10	11	12
DUP	George Haffey	23.73%	4,142											
UUP	Billy Bell*	17.79%	3,105											
DUP	George Seawright	11.39%	1,989	3,442.6										
PUP	Hugh Smyth*	11.06%	1,931	1,957	2,177.72	2,204.72	2,220.72	2,229.72	2,231.92	2,234.12	2,311.85	2,316.36	2,548.36	
UUP	Alfie Ferguson*	2.10%	367	395.4	625.42	989.62	990.24	1,016.79	1,017.3	1,019.1	1,375.09	1,380.69	1,789.06	2,200.15
Anti H-Block	Laurence Kennedy	6.13%	1,070	1,070	1,070	1,070	1,092	1,100.2	1,184.2	1,510	1,510	1,890	1,892.86	1,904.97
Alliance	Samuel Egerton*	5.79%	1,011	1,017.8	1,033.92	1,062.72	1,090.92	1,165.83	1,169.83	1,186.83	1,207.67	1,500.67	1,569.39	1,706.56
Ulster Democratic	Samuel Doyle	6.50%	1,135	1,164.2	1,257.82	1,293.42	1,294.42	1,312.53	1,316.24	1,318.44	1,359.66	1,367.28	1,481.88	
Ind. Unionist	Fred Proctor*	3.96%	692	754.4	982.56	1,032.36	1,032.36	1,046.89	1,050.29	1,053.2	1,129.37	1,130.88		
SDLP	Alphonsus Maginness	3.54%	618	618	618.62	619.42	663.42	678.42	719.42	863.82	864.44			
UUP	James Sands	2.21%	386	413.2	546.81	639.61	640.61	655.16	656.16	657.16				
Independent	Patrick Hunter	1.84%	321	324.2	324.82	325.62	332.62	345.13	524.13					
Independent	James Weir*	1.78%	311	311.8	313.35	313.95	322.95	329.95						
Independent	Peter Emerson	1.16%	202	203.6	214.45	220.45	232.76							
Republican Clubs	Margaret McNulty	1.01%	177	177	178.86	179.06								
Electorate: 28,598 Valid: 17,457 (61.04%) Spoilt: 624 Quota: 2,494 Turnout: 18,081 (63.22%)

=== Area F ===
1977: 2 x UUP, 1 x SDLP, 1 x DUP, 1 x Republican Clubs, 1 x Alliance
1981: 2 x DUP, 1 x SDLP, 1 x DUP, 1 x IRSP, 1 x Alliance
1977-1981 Change: DUP and IRSP gain from UUP and Republican Clubs

Area F - 6 seats
Party	Candidate	FPv%	Count									
Party	Candidate	FPv%	1	2	3	4	5	6	7	8	9	10
DUP	William Dickson*	17.80%	1,913									
Irish Republican Socialist	Sean Flynn	15.25%	1,639									
SDLP	Owen Allen*	8.36%	898	898.4	923.88	938.01	1,045.03	1,242.88	1,244.88	1,784.88		
Alliance	Will Glendinning*	7.85%	844	852	865	1,036.69	1,060.21	1,102.06	1,176.59	1,350.01	1,498.97	1,603.97
DUP	Eric Smyth	8.60%	924	1,203.2	1,203.98	1,204.44	1,207.57	1,211.97	1,304.57	1,308.57	1,317.39	1,512.99
UUP	James Stewart*	6.69%	719	742.6	742.86	742.86	742.86	753.99	969.39	969.59	970.57	1,460.35
Republican Clubs	Jim Sullivan*	9.32%	1,002	1,002	1,013.7	1,024.96	1,048.74	1,093.43	1,095.43	1,147.29	1,232.55	1,235.53
UUP	Linda Cust	5.94%	638	663.2	663.33	667.33	667.33	674.93	920.13	921.13	925.05	
SDLP	Maurice Fitzmaurice	6.69%	719	719.4	737.21	739.6	764.29	868.06	869.06			
UUP	Harry Fletcher*	5.78%	621	651	651.13	652.33	652.33	661.73				
SDLP	Mary Smyth	3.62%	389	395.2	406.64	410.16	458.8					
SDLP	Thomas Lappin	2.11%	227	227	243.64	245.9						
Alliance	Paul Maguire	2.00%	215	215.4	219.56							
Electorate: 18,575 Valid: 10,748 (57.86%) Spoilt: 680 Quota: 1,536 Turnout: 11,428 (61.52%)

=== Area G ===
1977: 2 x UUP, 1 x SDLP, 1 x DUP, 1 x Republican Clubs, 1 x Alliance
1981: 2 x DUP, 1 x UUP, 1 x SDLP, 1 x IRSP, 1 x UDP
1977-1981 Change: DUP, PD and UDP gain from UUP, Republican Clubs and Alliance

Area G - 6 seats
Party	Candidate	FPv%	Count						
Party	Candidate	FPv%	1	2	3	4	5	6	7
DUP	Frederick Ashby*	20.84%	2,076						
People's Democracy	Fergus O'Hare	19.60%	1,953						
Ulster Democratic	Samuel Millar	14.25%	1,420	1,437.36					
UUP	Cecil Walker*	11.77%	1,173	1,186.33	1,188.09	1,233.71	1,642.71		
SDLP	Brian Feeney	7.52%	749	749.31	1,033.55	1,102.63	1,108.94	1,110.6	1,419.23
DUP	Joseph Coggle	3.93%	392	979.76	980.64	1,000.88	1,143.04	1,323.15	1,375.7
Republican Clubs	Seamus Lynch*	7.53%	750	750.31	899.03	941.95	944.95	946.61	1,209.77
Ind. Socialist	Gerry Fitt*	5.43%	541	542.24	602.08	696.79	729.03	762.23	
UUP	Herbert Ditty*	5.97%	595	610.19	610.19	642.19			
Alliance	Philip McGarry	3.14%	313	315.48	348.04				
Electorate: 17,207 Valid: 9,962 (57.90%) Spoilt: 374 Quota: 1,424 Turnout: 10,336 (60.07%)

=== Area H ===
1977: 2 x UUP, 2 x Alliance, 1 x SDLP, 1 x DUP, 1 x Independent Unionist
1981: 2 x UUP, 2 x DUP, 1 x SDLP, 1 x Alliance, 1 x Independent Unionist
1977-1981 Change: DUP gain from Alliance

Area H - 7 seats
Party	Candidate	FPv%	Count								
Party	Candidate	FPv%	1	2	3	4	5	6	7	8	9
UUP	John Carson*	25.37%	5,014								
SDLP	Paschal O'Hare*	15.47%	3,057								
DUP	William Annon*	15.23%	3,010								
Ind. Unionist	Frank Millar*	9.35%	1,848	2,438.07	2,438.64	2,464.2	2,581.2				
Alliance	John Cushnahan*	8.80%	1,739	1,881.8	1,918.09	1,923.85	1,928.54	1,928.54	2,046.59	2,500.59	
UUP	Raymond Trimble	2.06%	408	1,729.92	1,729.92	1,736.58	1,770.19	1,782.19	1,786.19	1,978.92	2,295.92
DUP	William Gault	4.11%	813	990.48	990.48	1,423.38	1,506	1,530	1,532.87	1,993.65	2,239.65
SDLP	Alban Maginness	4.14%	818	829.22	1,336.52	1,336.52	1,336.52	1,336.52	1,593.23	1,613.71	1,723.71
NI Labour	Alan Carr	5.06%	1,000	1,091.8	1,095.6	1,110.54	1,231.25	1,246.25	1,334.79	1,397.21	
Alliance	Robert Jamison*	2.69%	531	646.26	651.58	653.2	655.2	659.2	676.84		
DUP	Pauline Strong	2.36%	466	510.37	510.37	555.01	611.88	630.88	630.88		
Republican Clubs	Liam Clarke	2.80%	553	560.14	579.52	580.42	580.42	580.42			
PUP	David Overend	2.55%	503	520.85	521.04	524.1					
Electorate: 33,505 Valid: 19,760 (58.98%) Spoilt: 720 Quota: 2,471 Turnout: 20,480 (61.13%)
