= 1977 Belfast City Council election =

Northern Ireland local election

← 1973	18 May 1977	1981 →

All 51 seats to Belfast City Council 26 seats needed for a majority
	First party	Second party	Third party
Party	UUP	Alliance	SDLP
Seats won	15	13	8
Seat change	▼10	▲5	▲1
	Fourth party	Fifth party	Sixth party
Party	DUP	Republican Clubs	Unionist Party NI
Seats won	7	3	2
Seat change	▲5	▲1	▲2
	Seventh party	Eighth party	Ninth party
Party	Ind. Unionist	Independent	Others
Seats won	2	1	0
Seat change	0	▲1	▼5
Lord Mayor before election
Myles Humphreys
UUP
Lord Mayor
James Stewart
UUP

Elections to Belfast City Council were held on 18 May 1977 on the same day as the other Northern Irish local government elections. The election used nine district electoral areas to elect a total of 51 councillors, most representing the more heavily populated north and west.

The UUP remained the largest party, and James Stewart became Lord Mayor. The narrow unionist majority of one on the council resulted in David Cook from Alliance becoming Lord Mayor in 1978, the first non-unionist Lord Mayor since 1898.

== Election results ==
Belfast local election result 1977
Party	Seats	Gains	Losses	Net gain/loss	Seats %	Votes %	Votes	+/−
UUP	15	1	11	▼10	29.4	26.8	30,087	▼23.9
Alliance	13	5	0	▲5	25.5	18.6	20,929	▲5.2
SDLP	8	1	0	▲1	15.7	18.9	20,920	▲7.5
DUP	7	5	0	▲5	13.7	13.3	14,926	▲11.0
Republican Clubs	3	1	0	▲1	5.9	4.7	5,238	▲0.7
Unionist Party NI	2	2	0	▲2	3.9	5.0	5,584	New
Ind. Unionist	2	0	0	0	3.9	4.1	4,567	▲1.1
Independent	1	1	0	▲1	2.0	2.6	3,431	▲2.6
NI Labour	0	0	2	▼2	0.0	2.6	2,959	▼2.9
UUUP	0	0	0	0	0.0	2.3	2,557	New
Vanguard	0	0	1	▼1	0.0	0.7	780	▼0.1
Communist	0	0	0	0	0.0	0.1	115	0.0
British Ulster Dominion Party	0	0	0	0	0.0	0.1	114	New
Ind. Socialist	0	0	0	0	0.0	0.1	107	▲0.1

Note: "Votes" are the first preference votes.

== Districts summary ==
Results of the Belfast City Council election, 1977 by district
Ward	%	Cllrs	%	Cllrs	%	Cllrs	%	Cllrs	%	Cllrs	%	Cllrs	%	Cllrs	Total Cllrs
Ward	UUP		Alliance		SDLP		DUP		RC		UPNI		Others		Total Cllrs
Area A	29.2	2	20.1	2	8.5	1	21.5	2	1.7	0	5.9	0	13.1	0	7
Area B	33.0	3	30.7	2	0.0	0	11.0	1	0.0	0	15.1	1	10.2	0	7
Area C	25.3	2	33.8	3	6.4	0	10.2	0	0.0	0	10.0	1	14.3	0	6
Area D	0.0	0	13.5	1	69.2	4	0.0	0	16.4	1	0.0	0	0.9	0	6
Area E	35.1	2	9.0	1	0.0	0	18.3	1	0.0	0	0.0	0	37.6	2	6
Area F	31.2	2	10.7	1	27.8	1	14.7	1	14.4	1	0.0	0	1.2	0	6
Area G	29.2	2	3.2	1	29.9	1	21.1	1	13.2	1	0.0	0	3.4	0	6
Area H	29.8	2	16.9	2	21.1	1	11.7	1	0.0	0	2.8	0	17.7	1	7
Total	26.8	15	18.6	13	18.6	8	13.3	7	4.7	3	5.0	2	13.0	3	51

== District results ==
=== Area A ===
1973: 4 x UUP, 1 x Alliance, 1 x Vanguard, 1 x NILP
1977: 2 x UUP, 2 x DUP, 2 x Alliance, 1 x SDLP
1973-1977 Change: DUP (two seats), Alliance and SDLP gain from UUP (two seats), Vanguard and NILP

Area A - 7 seats
Party	Candidate	FPv%	Count														
Party	Candidate	FPv%	1	2	3	4	5	6	7	8	9	10	11	12	13	14	15
Alliance	Basil Glass	16.03%	2,580														
UUP	Grace Bannister*	14.70%	2,367														
DUP	Raymond McCrea	11.88%	1,912	1,914.31	1,918.6	1,918.66	1,918.66	1,918.66	1,963.81	2,076.21							
UUP	William Blair*	6.37%	1,026	1,035.66	1,270.56	1,275.07	1,276.07	1,290.28	1,349.33	1,465.68	1,466.9	1,709.49	1,774.11	2,358.11			
DUP	Robert Newman	9.62%	1,549	1,549.63	1,552.33	1,552.33	1,554.33	1,601.78	1,618.78	1,631.23	1,682.47	1,708.38	1,724.38	1,764.02	1,798.02	2,368.02	
Alliance	Denis Loretto	4.14%	667	1,109.47	1,115.17	1,130.01	1,152.43	1,156.85	1,168.42	1,174.29	1,174.29	1,187.64	1,542.09	1,602.75	1,649.75	1,711.71	1,723.71
SDLP	Alasdair McDonnell	8.47%	1,364	1,397.6	1,398.2	1,408.56	1,566.55	1,567.55	1,571.55	1,571.55	1,571.55	1,573.55	1,633.23	1,636.23	1,638.23	1,643.44	1,644.44
Unionist Party NI	Thomas Jordan	5.93%	954	970.8	979.5	979.5	981.5	988.65	1,002.88	1,015.48	1,016.7	1,055.08	1,122.16	1,195.53	1,300.53	1,481.48	1,609.48
UUUP	Benjamin Horan*	4.20%	676	679.99	687.79	687.79	687.79	897.24	954.05	960.26	963.92	990.78	1,013.78	1,100.7	1,202.7		
UUP	Thomas Gildea*	3.00%	483	486.78	524.88	527.88	527.88	534.03	573.53	651.89	656.16	936.8	978.4				
NI Labour	Brian Garrett	3.69%	594	610.17	614.37	667.21	697.63	699.84	715.84	719.14	719.14	728.14					
UUP	Walter Shannon	2.81%	452	454.52	475.07	476.07	476.07	480.43	489.03	654.82	656.04						
UUP	Alfred Shaw	2.35%	378	379.89	393.84	396.84	396.84	400.14	409.74								
Ind. Unionist	William Elliott*	2.35%	379	380.05	385.75	387.38	387.38	388.38									
UUUP	Philip Moles	2.14%	345	345.84	347.79	347.79	349										
Republican Clubs	Terence McGrattan	1.73%	278	280.73	280.88	280.88											
NI Labour	Derek Peters	0.58%	93	95.94	96.54												
Electorate: 24,230 Valid: 16,097 (66.43%) Spoilt: 801 Quota: 2,013 Turnout: 16,898 (69.74%)

=== Area B ===
1973: 5 x UUP, 1 x Alliance, 1 x United Loyalist
1977: 3 x UUP, 2 x Alliance, 1 x UPNI, 1 x DUP
1973-1977 Change: Alliance, UPNI and DUP gain from UUP (two seats) and United Loyalist

Area B - 7 seats
Party	Candidate	FPv%	Count											
Party	Candidate	FPv%	1	2	3	4	5	6	7	8	9	10	11	12
Unionist Party NI	Joshua Cardwell*	15.11%	2,722											
Alliance	Oliver Napier	15.00%	2,703											
UUP	Thomas Patton*	12.26%	2,209	2,268.58										
Alliance	Michael Brown*	7.55%	2,045	2,120.6	2,350.44									
UUP	John Allen*	10.56%	1,903	1,994.08	2,004.79	2,008.51	2,010.4	2,196.94	2,249.22	2,662.22				
DUP	Henry Evans	5.87%	1,058	1,069.52	1,070.88	1,090.88	1,090.88	1,095.41	1,105.58	1,114.2	1,118.2	1,947.41	2,707.41	
UUP	Dorothy Dunlop	3.45%	622	683.02	691.69	697.77	699.45	934.73	963.93	1,274.06	1,620.06	1,637.13	1,979.01	2,337.01
Alliance	David Wonnacott	4.33%	781	812.5	984.88	989.41	1,073.62	1,083.29	1,487.12	1,524.51	1,535.51	1,541.4	1,573.3	1,595.3
UUUP	Reg Empey	5.44%	981	1,013.22	1,016.11	1,182.4	1,182.75	1,211.09	1,227.99	1,249.29	1,264.29	1,374.54		
DUP	Thomas McIntyre	5.11%	920	927.2	928.05	957.23	957.23	966.59	977.77	982.56	984.56			
UUP	William Corry*	3.69%	664	716.02	722.31	725.67	726.3	817.75	833.09					
NI Labour	William Gunning	3.50%	631	645.76	659.02	660.2	662.93	664.11						
UUP	Joseph Hanna	3.00%	541	562.78	565.16	571.86	572.56							
UUUP	Stanley Morgan	1.32%	237	245.1	246.29									
Electorate: 37,176 Valid: 18,017 (48.46%) Spoilt: 724 Quota: 2,253 Turnout: 18,741 (50.41%)

=== Area C ===
1973: 4 x UUP, 2 x Alliance
1977: 3 x Alliance, 2 x UUP, 1 x UPNI
1973-1977 Change: Alliance and UPNI gain from UUP (two seats)

Area C - 6 seats
Party	Candidate	FPv%	Count											
Party	Candidate	FPv%	1	2	3	4	5	6	7	8	9	10	11	12
Alliance	David Cook*	18.93%	2,748											
UUP	Andrew Cairns	8.86%	1,287	1,290.6	1,293.6	1,321.84	1,340.84	1,346.84	1,387.08	1,547.8	1,579.8	1,981.52	1,981.52	2,330.52
Alliance	William Jeffrey	6.14%	892	1,368.64	1,368.64	1,372.88	1,389.88	1,514.04	1,537.28	1,551.48	1,554.48	1,571.96	2,037.16	2,076.12
Alliance	Muriel Pritchard*	8.78%	1,274	1,394.24	1,398.24	1,401.24	1,435.72	1,529.12	1,543.12	1,554.8	1,557.8	1,582	2,002.28	2,047.44
UUP	Mary Crooks	7.87%	1,142	1,148.72	1,151.72	1,180.72	1,212.72	1,217.2	1,307.44	1,445.68	1,496.68	1,824.92	1,833.92	2,035.64
Unionist Party NI	Victor Brennan	9.96%	1,446	1,455.84	1,458.84	1,479.84	1,493.84	1,519.56	1,568.56	1,609.04	1,623.04	1,702	1,727	1,928.44
DUP	Alexander McMeekin	6.01%	872	872	884	957	976.24	978.24	990.24	1,010.24	1,493.24	1,523.48	1,525.48	1,650.72
Vanguard	Raymond Jordan	5.37%	780	784.32	788.32	825.56	876.56	882.56	914.56	963.8	1,022.8	1,068.04	1,072.04	
SDLP	Mary Scott	6.36%	923	937.4	938.4	938.4	950.4	992.4	994.4	996.4	997.4	999.4		
UUP	John William Kennedy*	4.34%	630	634.08	635.08	657.08	665.08	672.08	726.08	952.04	975.04			
DUP	William Spence	4.16%	604	604	607	629	667	673	691	697				
UUP	John Gilmore	4.26%	619	624.76	626.76	639.76	652.76	660.76	682.76					
Ind. Unionist	John Webster*	2.34%	340	340.96	343.96	349.2	369.2	371.2						
NI Labour	Ronald Macartney	2.27%	330	335.76	335.76	336.76	348.76							
Independent	William Weir	2.16%	313	313.72	314.72	319.72								
UUUP	Reginald Johnston	1.37%	199	199.96	276.96									
UUUP	James Robinson	0.82%	119	119										
Electorate: 29,635 Valid: 14,518 (48.99%) Spoilt: 523 Quota: 2,075 Turnout: 15,041 (50.75%)

=== Area D ===
1973: 4 x SDLP, 1 x Republican Clubs, 1 x Alliance
1977: 4 x SDLP, 1 x Republican Clubs, 1 x Alliance
1973-1977 Change: No change

Area D - 6 seats
Party	Candidate	FPv%	Count							
Party	Candidate	FPv%	1	2	3	4	5	6	7	8
SDLP	Paddy Devlin*	53.13%	7,087							
SDLP	Cormac Boomer	6.79%	905	2,925.84						
SDLP	Liam Hunter	3.58%	477	1,741.64	2,290.74					
SDLP	Mary Sullivan	5.70%	760	1,669.72	2,006.4					
Alliance	Dan McGuinness	9.26%	1,235	1,612.72	1,664.78	1,827.8	1,891.3	1,915.19		
Republican Clubs	Bernard McDonagh	7.06%	942	1,119.08	1,129.34	1,158.22	1,178.72	1,189.17	1,496.57	1,607.82
Republican Clubs	Martin Lynch	5.42%	723	862.08	873.48	905.02	944.58	955.79	1,228.61	1,338.67
Alliance	Robert Turkington	4.31%	575	660.88	667.34	745.62	762.5	785.68	824.15	
Republican Clubs	Kevin Smyth	3.95%	527	622	629.98	660	675.04	682.45		
Ind. Socialist	Gerard Campbell	0.80%	107	187.56	212.64	235.44				
Electorate: 35,266 Valid: 13,338 (37.82%) Spoilt: 1,594 Quota: 1,906 Turnout: 14,932 (42.34%)

=== Area E ===
1973: 1 x UUP, 1 x DUP, 1 x NILP, 1 x Alliance, 1 x United Loyalist, 1 x Independent Unionist
1977: 2 x UUP, 1 x DUP, 1 x Alliance, 1 x Independent, 1 x Independent Unionist
1973-1977 Change: UUP and Independent gain from NILP and United Loyalist

Area E - 6 seats
Party	Candidate	FPv%	Count								
Party	Candidate	FPv%	1	2	3	4	5	6	7	8	9
UUP	Billy Bell	24.38%	3,297								
Independent	James Weir	16.15%	2,184								
DUP	Fred Proctor*	12.98%	1,755	1,860.84	1,873.52	1,874.36	1,898.12	2,512.12			
Alliance	Samuel Egerton	9.04%	1,223	1,263.32	1,352.32	1,497.22	1,506.88	1,513.84	1,518.84	1,561.28	2,084.28
UUP	Alfie Ferguson	2.71%	366	1,106.04	1,118.98	1,123.04	1,323.24	1,366.76	1,497.76	1,566.38	1,748.98
Ind. Unionist	Hugh Smyth*	8.43%	1,140	1,174.44	1,179.44	1,180.42	1,214.98	1,240.58	1,353.58	1,657.4	1,714.82
UUP	David Smylie*	4.93%	667	798.46	811.88	812.16	1,062.46	1,109.5	1,249.5	1,390.36	1,501.78
NI Labour	George Chambers	5.98%	809	872.84	930.52	998.84	1,022.92	1,031.32	1,051.32	1,108.2	
Independent	Hugh Stockman	5.31%	718	741.94	767.36	785.98	801.98	822.08	891.08		
DUP	Bill Lavery	5.29%	715	760.78	765.88	767.42	784.94				
UUP	James Sands	3.05%	412	577.48	859.58	590.56					
Independent	Peter Emerson	1.75%	236	248.6							
Electorate: 30,109 Valid: 13,522 (44.91%) Spoilt: 706 Quota: 1,932 Turnout: 14,228 (47.25%)

=== Area F ===
1973: 3 x UUP, 1 x SDLP, 1 x DUP, 1 x Republican Clubs
1977: 2 x UUP, 1 x SDLP, 1 x DUP, 1 x Republican Clubs, 1 x Alliance
1973-1977 Change: Alliance gain from UUP

Area F - 6 seats
Party	Candidate	FPv%	Count								
Party	Candidate	FPv%	1	2	3	4	5	6	7	8	9
SDLP	Owen Allen	18.81%	1,886								
UUP	James Stewart*	16.76%	1,681								
Republican Clubs	Jim Sullivan*	10.96%	1,099	1,113.16	1,113.31	1,131.55	1,433.35				
UUP	Harry Fletcher*	10.78%	1,081	1,082.92	1,185.22	1,193.67	1,194.67	1,504.97			
DUP	William Dickson	9.46%	949	958.36	975.01	981.61	982.61	1,009.76	1,474.76		
Alliance	Will Glendinning	10.74%	1,077	1,142.04	1,152.09	1,173.96	1,188.27	1,211.97	1,221.92	1,287.92	1,316.92
SDLP	Thomas Lappin	8.97%	899	1,232.84	1,233.29	1,247.49	1,265.24	1,267.48	1,270.38	1,273.38	1,277.38
DUP	John Parkes	5.24%	525	525.72	534.27	538.57	538.57	575.67			
UUP	Thomas Murphy*	3.68%	369	369.48	470.88	480.88	480,88				
Republican Clubs	Sean O'Hare	3.45%	346	355.12	355.87	369.11					
Communist	James Stewart	1.15%	115	117.4	119.2						
Electorate: 21,177 Valid: 10,027 (47.35%) Spoilt: 1,013 Quota: 1,433 Turnout: 11,040 (52.13%)

=== Area G ===
1973: 3 x UUP, 1 x SDLP, 1 x Alliance, 1 x Independent Unionist
1977: 2 x UUP, 1 x SDLP, 1 x DUP, 1 x Republican Clubs, 1 x Alliance
1973-1977 Change: DUP and Republican Clubs gain from UUP and Independent Unionist

Area G - 6 seats
Party	Candidate	FPv%	Count						
Party	Candidate	FPv%	1	2	3	4	5	6	7
SDLP	Gerry Fitt*	29.81%	3,006						
Republican Clubs	Seamus Lynch	13.12%	1,323	2,124.04					
Alliance	Mary McKeown*	3.17%	320	1,051.6	1,632.54				
DUP	Frederick Ashby	13.66%	1,377	1,380.72	1,381.34	1,383.2	1,445.2		
UUP	Herbert Ditty*	10.34%	1,043	1,049.2	1,050.44	1,057.88	1,093.74	1,203.74	1,519.74
UUP	Cecil Walker	7.73%	779	779.62	782.72	792.64	812.74	1,027.38	1,318.68
DUP	George Haffey	7.36%	742	743.24	743.24	743.86	772.86	889.1	968.72
UUP	Margaret Laird*	5.87%	592	598.82	598.82	605.64	662.36	774.98	
UUP	Samuel Millar*	5.11%	515	515.62	518.72	532.36	618.84		
Ind. Unionist	Hugh Kidd*	3.84%	387	396.92	398.16	406.22			
Electorate: 20,959 Valid: 10,084 (48.11%) Spoilt: 886 Quota: 1,441 Turnout: 10,970 (52.34%)

=== Area H ===
1973: 5 x UUP, 1 x Alliance, 1 x SDLP
1977: 2 x UUP, 2 x Alliance, 1 x SDLP, 1 x DUP, 1 x Independent Unionist
1977-1981 Change: Alliance, DUP and Independent Unionist gain from UUP (three seats)

Area H - 7 seats
Party	Candidate	FPv%	Count											
Party	Candidate	FPv%	1	2	3	4	5	6	7	8	9	10	11	12
SDLP	Paschal O'Hare	14.52%	2,414											
Ind. Unionist	Frank Millar*	13.96%	2,321											
UUP	John Carson*	13.53%	2,250											
UUP	Myles Humphreys*	11.68%	1,942	1,942.14	2,000.11	2,016.76	2,073.53	2,360.53						
Alliance	John Cushnahan	11.21%	1,865	1,881.1	1,883.19	1,885.3	1,887.4	1,896.08	1,901.08	1,902.19	2,104.19			
DUP	William Annon	9.06%	1,507	1,507.14	1,561.59	1,590.34	1,597.55	1,608.82	1,613.82	2,041.03	2,048.37	2,064.18	2,290.18	
Alliance	Robert Jamison	5.68%	944	951.14	956.75	959.75	961.15	977.02	990.02	995.79	1,116.18	1,323.08	1,680.41	1,770.41
SDLP	Alban Maginness	6.61%	1,099	1,406.44	1,406.99	1,407.99	1,408.2	1,408.2	1,409.2	1,409.42	1,444.26	1,445.26	1,451.31	1,461.31
UUP	Mary Creighton*	1.99%	331	331	367.85	399.16	469.65	577.41	821.41	848.99	925.06	1,160.88		
Unionist Party NI	Joseph Gibson	2.78%	462	462.14	472.48	482.7	486.69	506.04	515.04	522.41	546.63			
NI Labour	Alan Carr	3.02%	502	504.24	508.97	513.41	515.23	517.34	518.34	519.74				
DUP	Cynthia McDowell	2.65%	441	441	472.13	484.46	486.77	492.07	495.07					
UUP	James Kennett	2.64%	439	439	455.17	458.83	466.39							
Dominion Party	Alexander Beattie	0.69%	114	114	124.78									
Electorate: 35,074 Valid: 16,631 (47.42%) Spoilt: 684 Quota: 2,079 Turnout: 17,315 (49.37%)
