= 1973 Belfast City Council election =

- 30 May 1973

All 51 seats to Belfast City Council 26 seats needed for a majority
- Turnout: 62.54%
	First party	Second party	Third party
Party	UUP	Alliance	SDLP
Seats won	25	8	7
	Fourth party	Fifth party	Sixth party
Party	NI Labour	Republican Clubs	Democratic Unionist Party
Seats won	2	2	2
	Seventh party	Eighth party	Ninth party
Party	Ind. Unionist	United Loyalist	Loyalist Coalition
Seats won	2	2	1
- Map showing results by electoral area.
Council control before election
Irish Unionist
Council control after election
No overall control

Elections to Belfast City Council were held on 30 May 1973 on the same day as the other Northern Irish local government elections. The election used eight district electoral areas to elect a total of 51 councillors.

The elections were the first following the reorganisation of local government in Northern Ireland, brought about by the Local Government (Boundaries) Act (Northern Ireland) 1971 & Local Government Act (Northern Ireland) 1972, which replaced the previous FPTP ward system with a new system of proportional representation using multi-member district electoral areas.

The Ulster Unionist Party maintained its position as the largest party, winning just short of a majority, and William Christie continued as Lord Mayor.

== Results by party ==
Party	Seats	±	First Pref. votes	FPv%	±%
UUP	25		83,658	50.7	
Alliance	8		22,081	13.4	
SDLP	7		18,827	11.4	
NI Labour	2		9,046	5.5	
Republican Clubs	2		6,584	4.0	
United Loyalist	2		6,274	3.8	
Ind. Unionist	2		4,997	3.0	
DUP	2		3,860	2.3	
Loyalist Coalition	1		4,823	2.9	
Republican Labour	0		2,594	1.6	
Independent Unionist Loyalist	0		967	0.6	
Independent Ratepayer	0		610	0.4	
Communist	0		211	0.1	
Ulster Liberal	0		172	0.1	
Non-Party	0		88	0.1	
Independent	0		180	0.1	
Totals	51		168,667	100.0	—

== Districts summary ==
Results of the Belfast City Council election, 1973 by district
Ward	%	Cllrs	%	Cllrs	%	Cllrs	%	Cllrs	%	Cllrs	%	Cllrs	%	Cllrs	Total Cllrs
Ward	UUP		Alliance		SDLP		NILP		RC		DUP		Others		Total Cllrs
Area A	55.4	4	10.6	1	5.2	0	6.1	1	0.0	0	8.2	0	14.5	1	7
Area B	62.3	5	19.6	1	0.0	0	5.4	0	0.0	0	0.0	0	12.7	0	7
Area C	54.7	4	22.8	2	4.5	0	4.7	0	2.4	0	0.0	0	10.9	0	6
Area D	7.0	0	19.3	1	44.5	4	4.0	0	18.2	1	0.0	0	7.0	0	6
Area E	39.9	1	7.4	1	7.3	0	10.2	1	0.0	0	13.5	1	21.7	2	6
Area F	49.2	3	3.8	0	18.7	1	2.5	0	16.1	1	7.5	1	2.2	0	6
Area G	56.6	3	3.3	1	16.5	1	3.9	0	4.8	0	0.0	0	14.9	0	6
Area H	62.0	5	15.9	1	14.8	1	4.7	0	0.0	0	0.0	0	2.6	0	7
Total	50.7	25	13.4	8	11.4	7	5.5	2	4.0	2	2.3	2	12.7	5	51

== Districts results ==
=== Area A ===
1973: 4 x UUP, 1 x Alliance, 1 x Vanguard, 1 x NILP

Area A - 7 seats
Party	Candidate	FPv%	Count															
Party	Candidate	FPv%	1	2	3	4	5	6	7	8	9	10	11	12	13	14	15	16
UUP	Grace Bannister	25.50%	6,328															
UUP	William Blair	6.04%	1,498	3,050	3,050	3,053.5	3,065.5	3,066.5	3,098.5	3,103.5								
UUP	Benjamin Horan	11.15%	2,768	2,958.5	2,959.5	2,959.5	2,982	2,984	3,069.5	3,075.5	3,099	3,176						
UUP	Thomas Gildea	6.44%	1,598	2,079	2,079	2,084.5	2,096.5	2,096.5	2,111	2,122	2,146.5	2,170.5	2,786	2,792	3,714			
Alliance	Patricia Carson	5.30%	1,315	1,373	1,376	1,440	1,440	1,457	1,459	1,675.5	2,398.5	2,410	2,444.5	2,444.5	2,535.5	2,688.5	3,226.5	
Vanguard	William Elliott	5.33%	1,322	1,358.5	1,358.5	1,358.5	1,418.5	1,419.5	1,498	1,500	1,506	1,622	1,698	1,705	1,773.5	1,847.5	1,850.5	3,049
NI Labour	Erskine Holmes	5.39%	1,337	1,378.5	1,421.5	1,431.5	1,437	1,662.5	1,669.5	1,730	1,841	1,856	1,881.5	1,884.5	1,953	2,048	2,860.5	2,901.5
DUP	Thomas Wright	4.67%	1,158	1,176.5	1,177.5	1,177.5	1,209.5	1,212.5	1,269.5	1,271.5	1,273.5	1,860.5	1,889	1,927	2,025	2,184	2,187	2,391.5
United Loyalist	W. Dougherty	4.83%	1,198	1,265	1,265	1,265	1,317	1,317	1,405	1,406	1,414	1,527.5	1,568	1,571	1,619	1,666	1,670	
SDLP	Ben Caraher	5.25%	1,302	1,309.5	1,329.5	1,332.5	1,332.5	1,445	1,446	1,483	1,502.5	1,504	1,509.5	1,510.5	1,512.5	1,512.5		
UUP	John McKeown	4.11%	1,021	1,218.5	1,218.5	1,221.5	1,226.5	1,226.5	1,238	1,240	1,252	1,274	1,463.5	1,476.5				
UUP	Emma Dunbar	2.20%	546	964.5	965.5	967.5	971.5	971.5	996.5	1,001.5	1,020.5	1,056						
DUP	W. G. Greene	3.52%	874	905	907	907	937.5	940.5	1,004.5	1,005.5	1,013.5							
Alliance	Sam Edgerton	2.83%	702	716	720	756	761	780	784	979.5								
Alliance	Bernadette Hopkirk	1.73%	430	435.5	436.5	494.5	497	550	552									
Ind. Unionist	J. Keenan	1.74%	432	443	443	446	479	480										
NI Labour	J. Murray	1.70%	421	422.5	440.5	446.5	450.5											
Ulster Constitution Party	Lindsay Mason	1.09%	271	280	280	281												
Alliance	Jacqueline Maguire	0.77%	192	194	196													
Communist	H. Moore	0.41%	101	101														
Electorate: 38,311 Valid: 24,814 (64.77%) Spoilt: 360 Quota: 3,102 Turnout: 25,174 (65.71%)

=== Area B ===
1973: 5 x UUP, 1 x Alliance, 1 x United Loyalist

Area B - 7 seats
Party	Candidate	FPv%	Count											
Party	Candidate	FPv%	1	2	3	4	5	6	7	8	9	10	11	12
UUP	Joshua Cardwell	25.41%	6,708											
UUP	John Allen	14.81%	3,910											
United Loyalist	H. K. Dickey	12.77%	3,371											
Alliance	Michael Brown	9.65%	2,549	2,646.41	2,685.56	2,707.71	2,708.93	2,860.37	2,899.56	3,386.56				
UUP	William Corry	5.64%	1,488	2,786.46	3,156.21	3,158.38	3,174.74	3,193.73	3,212.88	3,266.45	3,331.45			
UUP	Thomas Patton	6.94%	1,833	2,274.66	2,305.86	2,310.37	2,332.83	2,342.57	2,354.71	2,372.88	2,490.79	2,491.87	2,498.14	3,223.5
UUP	H. Cranston	4.11%	1,085	1,953.53	2,024.63	2,029.29	2,036.75	2,041.6	2,056.47	2,095.94	2,170.59	2,175.99	2,194.23	3,261.63
Alliance	David Wonnacott	4.56%	1,205	1,241.21	1,243.31	1,260.37	1,260.71	1,536	1,546.59	1,902.65	2,630.45	2,705.33	2,707.04	2,896.56
UUP	Dorothy Dunlop	5.41%	1,428	1,942.59	1,988.64	1,992.3	2,002.48	2,009.67	2,028.6	2,074.11	2,144.78	2,148.56	2,152.55	
NI Labour	William Gunning	2.18%	575	607.64	609.74	795.29	797.43	804.64	1,290.46	1,328.86				
Alliance	Samuel Coulson	3.33%	878	920.84	930.44	936.63	936.99	1,024.69	1,048.94					
NI Labour	H. Conway	1.92%	507	533.52	539.07	626.58	627.76	631.8						
Alliance	P. Miller	2.02%	534	555.93	558.93	566.59	567.13							
NI Labour	W. Kirkpatrick	1.26%	332	343.73	344.63									
Electorate: 39,227 Valid: 26,403 (67.31%) Spoilt: 385 Quota: 3,301 Turnout: 26,788 (68.29%)

=== Area C ===
1973: 4 x UUP, 2 x Alliance

Area C - 6 seats
Party	Candidate	FPv%	Count								
Party	Candidate	FPv%	1	2	3	4	5	6	7	8	9
Alliance	David Cook	10.60%	2,241	2,254	2,327	2,360	2,584	3,027			
UUP	John Webster	13.11%	2,770	2,771	2,771	2,946	2,952	2,985	3,023		
Alliance	Muriel Pritchard	5.55%	1,172	1,174	1,176	1,198	1,427	1,757	2,279	3,158	
UUP	F. J. McGibben	10.63%	2,247	2,247	2,247	2,278	2,296	2,314	2,355	2,364	3,114
UUP	John William Kennedy	12.35%	2,611	2,616	2,618	2,648	2,660	2,678	2,743	2,753	3,113
UUP	W. D. Gilmore	11.93%	2,522	2,525	2,528	2,616	2,626	2,645	2,726	2,741	3,003
United Loyalist	N. McNarry	8.01%	1,693	1,694	1,697	1,794	1,797	1,806	1,857	1,871	1,926
UUP	N. Preston	6.64%	1,404	1,404	1,404	1,420	1,424	1,432	1,453	1,464	
SDLP	Mary Scott	4.49%	948	949	1,149	1,160	1,177	1,197	1,413		
NI Labour	Brian Garrett	3.87%	817	957	1,029	1,077	1,103	1,146			
Alliance	William Jeffrey	3.46%	731	737	745	800	948				
Alliance	W. McDonough	3.22%	681	683	685	699					
Independent	D. Donaghy	2.87%	610	614	639						
Republican Clubs	P. Callaghan	2.38%	503	508							
NI Labour	W. Copley	0.88%	186								
Electorate: 32,071 Valid: 21,136 (65.90%) Spoilt: 210 Quota: 3,020 Turnout: 21,346 (66.56%)

=== Area D ===
1973: 4 x SDLP, 1 x Alliance, 1 x Republican Clubs

Area D - 6 seats
Party	Candidate	FPv%	Count																			
Party	Candidate	FPv%	1	2	3	4	5	6	7	8	9	10	11	12	13	14	15	16	17	18	19	20
SDLP	J. Gillespie	15.46%	2,306																			
Republican Clubs	Raymond O'Hagan	4.35%	649	649.84	652.84	652.84	652.84	657.84	663.91	791.91	796.91	799.91	985.05	996.26	1,005.47	1,035.47	1,040.75	1,509.82	1,573.78	1,574.78	2,559.38	
SDLP	Desmond O'Donnell	8.93%	1,332	1,360.84	1,364.91	1,366.98	1,371.19	1,383.19	1,394.19	1,402.19	1,406.19	1,414.33	1,416.33	1,471.82	1,690.48	1,728.97	1,760.95	1,776.02	2,114.9	2,115.9	2,138.32	
Alliance	P. D. Corrie	7.77%	1,159	1,162.92	1,163.92	1,164.92	1,167.99	1,174.99	1,175.99	1,177.99	1,184.06	1,266.06	1,268.06	1,351.13	1,366.41	1,386.48	1,656.7	1,668.9	1,698.18	1,810.18	1,853.18	1,819.18
SDLP	J. P. McCarron	5.84%	871	954.09	959.16	963.65	965.72	971.93	979.07	983.07	1,004.21	1,015.95	1,017.42	1,099.96	1,176.73	1,244.36	1,272.78	1,286.13	1,493.21	1,498.21	1,566.26	1,701.26
SDLP	P. G. Wilson	7.24%	1,080	1,087.14	1,088.14	1,091.14	1,097.14	1,104.35	1,108.4	1,112.42	1,136.49	1,145.7	1,152.7	1,183.7	1,294.75	1,332.96	1,356.1	1,383.17	1,532.53	1,553.53	1,572.53	1,687.53
Alliance	Reginald Donnelly	5.52%	822	825.29	827.29	828.29	832.29	838.29	839.29	847.29	849.36	923.43	924.43	986.57	1,005.64	1,023.92	1,364.48	1,375.55	1,396.76	1,441.76	1,468.83	1,483.83
Republican Clubs	John Brady	5.08%	758	758.91	765.91	773.05	774.05	775.05	787.19	866.19	888.86	889.26	945.26	955.47	963.47	1,136.89	1,143.89	1,383.03	1,412.1	1,412.1		
UUP	A. W. Shaw	7.01%	1,045	1,045.07	1,045.07	1,046.07	1,046.07	1,049.07	1,050.07	1,050.07	1,050.07	1,052.07	1,052.07	1,057.07	1,058.07	1,059.07	1,065.14	1,066.14	1,066.14			
SDLP	A. McKenna	3.55%	530	541.97	548.97	562.11	565.11	568.11	672.18	676.18	680.18	701.39	709.39	730.88	808.37	851.72	878.14	909.21				
Republican Clubs	Ethel McAllister	4.59%	684	684.56	686.56	691.7	691.7	691.7	692.7	709.7	727.84	729.84	818.84	826.05	832.05	861.12	866.12					
Alliance	A. J. McGrogan	3.82%	569	572.01	573.08	573.08	579.15	585.22	585.22	586.22	588.22	691.29	698.29	754.36	764.36	772.71						
Republican Labour	D. Barnes	2.41%	360	362.66	376.66	388.73	389.73	392.73	451.73	454.73	592.8	596.94	607.01	634.08	652.15							
SDLP	O'Connor	3.51%	524	529.32	532.32	533.32	534.32	537.32	543.6	544.6	550.6	557.67	565.74	583.81								
NI Labour	T. Hannon	2.19%	326	329.64	330.64	334.64	362.64	501.64	508.64	508.64	526.71	538.71	539.71									
Republican Clubs	Bernard McDonagh	2.28%	340	340.21	343.21	346.42	346.42	346.42	346.49	369.49	378.56	381.56										
Alliance	Monica Slavin	2.23%	332	332.98	334.05	336.05	341.12	345.12	350.12	351.12	353.12											
Republican Labour	J. Flanigan	1.62%	241	241.84	248.84	275.84	275.84	277.84	299.84	303.84												
Republican Clubs	J. J. McElroy	1.85%	276	276.07	281.07	283.07	283.07	285.07	291.07													
Republican Labour	J. J. McNamee	1.72%	256	256.7	264.84	269.84	271.91	272.91														
NI Labour	R. Watson	1.13%	169	169.56	170.56	171.56	220.63															
NI Labour	P. Moyna	0.73%	109	109.63	112.63	112.7																
Republican Labour	J. Lavelle	0.60%	90	91.26	97.33																	
Republican Labour	F. McDermott	0.58%	86	86.49																		
Electorate: 34,437 Valid: 14,914 (43.31%) Spoilt: 1,001 Quota: 2,131 Turnout: 15,915 (46.21%)

=== Area E ===
1973: 1 x UUP, 1 x DUP, 1 x NILP, 1 x Alliance, 1 x United Loyalist, 1 x Independent Unionist

Area E - 6 seats
Party	Candidate	FPv%	Count							
Party	Candidate	FPv%	1	2	3	4	5	6	7	8
UUP	William Christie	39.88%	7,875							
DUP	Fred Proctor	10.92%	2,156	3,413.95						
Ind. Unionist	Hugh Smyth	10.86%	2,145	3,131.7						
NI Labour	Billy Boyd	8.90%	1,758	2,439.85	2,485.73	2,518.7	2,554.11	2,808.9	2,879.9	
United Loyalist	David Smylie	6.13%	1,210	1,761.2	2,295.1	2,463.53	2,556.84	2,578.66	2,581.61	3,030.61
Alliance	James Robinson	7.35%	1,452	2,003.85	2,051.95	2,071.27	2,104.13	2,183.45	2,216.75	2,487.35
SDLP	J. P. Goan	5.12%	1,012	1,016.55	1,018.03	1,018.03	1,018.03	1,388.98	1,974.63	1,985.47
DUP	K. B. Hoy	2.60%	514	1,110.05	1,247.32	1,309.48	1,352.84	1,376.8	1,380.8	
Republican Labour	T. Fleming	4.26%	842	845.25	845.25	845.25	845.9	870.9		
SDLP	P. J. Tanney	2.19%	432	433.3	433.67	434.3	434.51			
NI Labour	George Chambers	1.34%	264	338.1	346.24	349.6	358.59			
Independent	J. Moore	0.45%	88	208.25	223.79	236.81				
Electorate: 31,548 Valid: 19,748 (62.60%) Spoilt: 267 Quota: 2,822 Turnout: 20,015 (63.44%)

=== Area F ===
1973: 3 x UUP, 1 x SDLP, 1 x DUP, 1 x Republican Clubs

Area F - 6 seats
Party	Candidate	FPv%	Count															
Party	Candidate	FPv%	1	2	3	4	5	6	7	8	9	10	11	12	13	14	15	16
UUP	Harry Fletcher	21.82%	3,441															
UUP	James Stewart	21.06%	3,320															
UUP	Thomas Murphy	6.34%	1,000	2,049.24	2,971.48													
SDLP	Paddy Devlin	14.22%	2,242	2,242	2,242.64	2,242.96	2,259.96											
Republican Clubs	Jim Sullivan	4.66%	735	735.34	735.66	735.98	740.98	752.98	753.98	753.98	756.98	758.98	772.98	1,072.98	1,072.98	1,461.98	1,691.64	2,419.62
DUP	William Spence	7.55%	1,190	1,286.9	1,389.3	1,768.5	1,771.46	1,776.1	1,779.1	1,796.54	1,796.54	1,797.86	1,808.06	1,859.24	1,860.56	1,861.56	1,935.46	1,939.46
SDLP	Owen Allen	3.01%	475	475.34	475.98	476.3	482.62	493.62	524.62	533.42	536.36	704.56	720.05	804.39	877.39	896.71	1,228.12	1,282.44
Republican Clubs	Sean O'Hare	4.44%	700	700.68	701.64	701.64	705.64	720.64	744.64	747.64	748.13	751.62	751.62	769.94	850.92	1,089.92	1,111.24	
Alliance	Mary Smyth	2.35%	370	376.12	382.2	413.88	416.22	431.9	423.24	448.44	448.44	475.44	693.79	859.69	872.69	876.69		
Republican Clubs	A. Dornan	3.55%	560	560	560.32	560.32	562.32	546.32	595.32	595.32	595.32	595.64	597.64	606.64	681.64			
Republican Clubs	Sean Flynn	3.41%	538	538.34	538.66	538.98	539.98	543.98	556.98	558.98	559.96	573.96	576.96	581.96				
NI Labour	T. Magee	1.47%	232	538.34	538.66	538.98	539.98	543.98	556.98	558.98	559.96	573.96	576.96					
Alliance	P. Woods	1.46%	230	231.02	234.22	249.58	260.58	258.9	258.9	270.82	272.29	285.29						
SDLP	Desmond Gillespie	1.46%	230	231.02	231.02	231.98	234.98	237.98	257.98	265.3	265.79							
NI Labour	W. Ritchie	1.05%	165	170.44	180.36	213.32	213.66	229.98	232.98									
Republican Labour	W. J. Clarke	0.82%	129	129.34	129.34	129.66	179.66	186.66										
Communist	Betty Sinclair	0.70%	110	110.68	111.96	113.88	115.22											
Republican Labour	Margaret McKenna	0.46%	72	72	72.64	73.28												
Republican Labour	J. Marron	0.18%	29	31.72	33.64	33.96												
Electorate: 27,067 Valid: 15,768 (58.26%) Spoilt: 622 Quota: 2,253 Turnout: 16,390 (60.55%)

=== Area G ===
1973: 3 x UUP, 1 x SDLP, 1 x Alliance, 1 x Independent Unionist

Area G - 6 seats
Party	Candidate	FPv%	Count														
Party	Candidate	FPv%	1	2	3	4	5	6	7	8	9	10	11	12	13	14	15
UUP	Margaret Laird	20.90%	3,632														
UUP	Herbert Ditty	20.46%	3,556														
SDLP	Gerry Fitt	16.55%	2,876														
UUP	Hugh Kidd	15.25%	2,651														
Ind. Unionist	Samuel Millar	13.18%	2,291	3,210.98													
Alliance	Mary McKeown	3.29%	572	680.68	1,104.32	1,194	1,259.66	1,314.91	1,315.05	1,320.88	1,331.8	1,334.48	1,366.76	1,386.81	1,408.92	1,618.44	1,757.85
NI Labour	T. Pakenham	1.05%	182	240.14	552.26	670.06	677.06	723.3	724.44	727.42	757.33	738.57	860.69	867.43	882.73	1,242.63	1,366.79
Republican Clubs	John McAlea	2.16%	376	376.76	384.24	385	433.86	434.37	435.93	440.35	446.91	515.49	517.33	585.17	971.62	1,029.61	
Republican Clubs	J. Boyle	2.12%	368	398.02	533.34	568.3	627.66	653.16	653.86	661.66	671.64	673.79	779.83	803.97	847.81		
Republican Clubs	F. P. McGlade	1.67%	291	292.9	296.3	296.3	340.54	341.56	343.26	346.68	348.82	451.24	457.64	547.92			
Republican Labour	Jim O'Kane	1.11%	193	193.38	194.06	194.44	277.6	277.94	295.68	305.6	315	333.75	339.57				
NI Labour	Jack Sharkey	0.76%	132	143.78	228.78	260.7	282.96	301.83	304.33	312.6	328.29	330.69					
Republican Clubs	D. O'Hare	1.00%	174	174.38	177.78	177.78	198.22	198.9	200.16	205	206.7						
Independent	J. P. Rigby	0.01%	13	16.42	81.7	108.3	112.08	122.62	122.76	154.57							
Independent	Moya Saunders	0.03%	52	56.56	77.64	90.56	100.42	105.17	106.31								
Republican Labour	H. Scullion	0.01%	19	19.38	20.06	20.44	31.64	31.64									
Electorate: 29,530 Valid: 17,378 (58.85%) Spoilt: 517 Quota: 2,483 Turnout: 17,895 (60.60%)

=== Area H ===
1973: 5 x UUP, 1 x Alliance, 1 x SDLP

Area H - 7 seats
Party	Candidate	FPv%	Count															
Party	Candidate	FPv%	1	2	3	4	5	6	7	8	9	10	11	12	13	14	15	16
UUP	John Carson	22.24%	5,518															
UUP	Frank Millar	16.09%	3,993															
SDLP	Thomas Donnelly	10.75%	2,667	2,668.32	2,669.01	2,671.01	2,701.24	2,701.24	2,934.24	2,956.91	2,989.91	3,013.91	3,162.91					
Alliance	John Ferguson	9.15%	2,271	2,325.12	2,336.12	2,347.92	2,370.15	2,384.26	2,389.26	2,424.69	2,474.68	2,805.17	3,160.17					
UUP	Myles Humphreys	7.80%	1,935	2,443.64	2,583.48	2,609.11	2,613.78	2,637.6	2,637.83	2,656.64	2,668.86	2,686.42	2,706.16	2,706.74	2,998.55	3,215.55		
UUP	Mary Creighton	2.94%	730	1,792.16	1,974.32	1,987.98	1,995.32	2,026.6	2,026.6	2,051.29	2,064.96	2,078.18	2,157.54	2,158.12	2,489.68	2,892.62	3,127.62	
UUP	W. Shannon	5.09%	1,263	1,471.56	1,585.41	1,592.28	1,598.11	1,616.52	1,616.52	1,622.98	1,631.53	1,640.64	1,648.08	1,648.08	1,908.68	2,187.26	2,291.6	2,359.61
UUP	H. E. Smith	5.02%	1,245	1,379.64	1,444.04	1,455.27	1,464.82	1,478.61	1,478.61	1,485.95	1,500.73	1,526.05	1,540.72	1,542.16	1,715.71	1,965.18	2,162.03	2,207.17
Alliance	Maureen McManus	3.93%	974	980.16	981.31	983.31	1,003.31	1,010.75	1,013.75	1,027.19	1,075.19	1,406.39	1,566.17	1,621.85	1,638.53	1,657.53		
Ulster Constitution Party	David Riddelsdell	3.90%	967	1,045.76	1,199.4	1,204.72	1,209.95	1,252.8	1,254.8	1,258.47	1,262.14	1,263.81	1,280.59	1,281.17	1,359.64			
UUP	W. Lavery	2.78%	689	967.96	1,132.64	1,141.22	1,146.22	1,157.4	1,157.63	1,168.22	1,185.46	1,195.79	1,218	1,219.16				
NI Labour	S. Barbour	1.74%	432	442.56	446.01	448.01	456.01	456.01	474.01	602.58	905.73	923.17						
Alliance	Hannah Lantin	2.82%	700	710.56	713.55	729.99	741.99	745.99	746.99	762.66	791.77							
NI Labour	Mary Simpson	1.64%	407	416.68	420.82	420.82	441.28	441.95	452.95	544.5								
NI Labour	B. Boyd	1.32%	327	341.96	350.93	351.93	367.81	372.81	379.81									
Republican Labour	B. Loughran	1.12%	277	277	277.46	280.46	288.46	288.46										
Ind. Unionist	J. N. McCauley	0.52%	129	148.36	160.32	181.47	184.47											
Ulster Liberal	R. A. Smith	0.69%	172	175.96	178.72	180.72												
Independent	S. Daly	0.47%	115	126.88	134.7													
Electorate: 37,491 Valid: 24,811 (66.18%) Spoilt: 333 Quota: 3,102 Turnout: 25,144 (67.07%)
