= Belfast Area C =

Electoral division in Belfast, Northern Ireland

Area C was one of the eight district electoral areas (DEA) which existed in Belfast, Northern Ireland from 1973 to 1985. Located in the south of the city, the district elected six members to Belfast City Council and contained the wards of Finaghy; Malone; Stranmillis; University; Upper Malone; and Windsor. The DEA largely formed part of the Belfast South constituency.

== History ==
The area was created for the 1973 local government elections, combining the whole of the former Windsor ward with most of the former Cromac ward, parts of the Saint Anne's ward and parts of the former Lisburn Rural District. It was abolished for the 1985 local government elections. The University ward (which was renamed Botanic in 1985) and Stranmillis wards became part of a new Laganbank DEA, while the remaining four wards joined the Blackstaff ward, formerly part of Area F, in the new Balmoral DEA.

== Councillors ==
Election	Councillor (Party)	Councillor (Party)	Councillor (Party)	Councillor (Party)	Councillor (Party)	Councillor (Party)
1981	David Cook (Alliance)	Muriel Pritchard (Alliance)	Brian Gibson (DUP)	William Stevenson (DUP)	Andrew Cairns (UUP)	Mary Crooks (UUP)
1977	David Cook (Alliance)	Muriel Pritchard (Alliance)	William Jeffrey (Alliance)	Victor Brennan (UPNI)	Andrew Cairns (UUP)	Mary Crooks (UUP)
1973	David Cook (Alliance)	Muriel Pritchard (Alliance)	John William Kennedy (UUP)	John Webster (UUP)	F. J. McKibben (UUP)	W. D. Gilmore (UUP)

== 1981 Election ==
1977: 3 x Alliance, 2 x UUP, 1 x UPNI

1981: 2 x UUP, 2 x Alliance, 2 x DUP

1977-1981 Change: DUP (two seats) gain from Alliance and UPNI

Area C - 6 seats
Party	Candidate	FPv%	Count								
Party	Candidate	FPv%	1	2	3	4	5	6	7	8	9
Alliance	David Cook*	15.65%	2,493								
Alliance	Muriel Pritchard*	7.27%	1,158	1,217.52	1,280.08	1,347.72	1,362.88	2,376.96			
UUP	Andrew Cairns*	12.13%	1,933	1,937.32	1,942.32	2,166.88	2,187.88	2,202.84	2,835.84		
UUP	Mary Crooks*	13.18%	2,099	2,104.2	2,111.1	2,191.6	2,216.76	2,260.24	2,828.24		
DUP	Brian Gibson	9.43%	1,503	1,504.04	1,505.12	1,529.12	1,720.12	1,727.12	1,805.48	2,040.48	2,229.48
DUP	William Stevenson	7.62%	1,214	1,214.32	1,214.32	1,222.32	1,687.56	1,694.8	1,753.28	1,872.28	1,971.28
SDLP	Ben Caraher	9.42%	1,501	1,508.6	1,792.12	1,795.12	1,795.12	1,828.96	1,843.44	1,845.44	1,850.44
UUP	John Gilmore	8.32%	1,326	1,330.72	1,336.88	1,396.04	1,411.12	1,421			
Alliance	William Jeffrey*	5.73%	913	1,021	1,108.48	1,150.2	1,156.44				
DUP	Thomas McIntyre	4.58%	729	729.8	730.8	744.88					
Unionist Party NI	Victor Brennan*	3.34%	532	534.72	536.72						
Republican Clubs	Gerard Carr	3.33%	530	532.96							
Electorate: 28,354 Valid: 15,931 (56.19%) Spoilt: 529 Quota: 2,276 Turnout: 16,460 (58.05%)

== 1977 Election ==
1973: 4 x UUP, 2 x Alliance

1977: 3 x Alliance, 2 x UUP, 1 x UPNI

1973-1977 Change: Alliance and UPNI gain from UUP (two seats)

Area C - 6 seats
Party	Candidate	FPv%	Count											
Party	Candidate	FPv%	1	2	3	4	5	6	7	8	9	10	11	12
Alliance	David Cook*	18.93%	2,748											
UUP	Andrew Cairns	8.86%	1,287	1,290.6	1,293.6	1,321.84	1,340.84	1,346.84	1,387.08	1,547.8	1,579.8	1,981.52	1,981.52	2,330.52
Alliance	William Jeffrey	6.14%	892	1,368.64	1,368.64	1,372.88	1,389.88	1,514.04	1,537.28	1,551.48	1,554.48	1,571.96	2,037.16	2,076.12
Alliance	Muriel Pritchard*	8.78%	1,274	1,394.24	1,398.24	1,401.24	1,435.72	1,529.12	1,543.12	1,554.8	1,557.8	1,582	2,002.28	2,047.44
UUP	Mary Crooks	7.87%	1,142	1,148.72	1,151.72	1,180.72	1,212.72	1,217.2	1,307.44	1,445.68	1,496.68	1,824.92	1,833.92	2,035.64
Unionist Party NI	Victor Brennan	9.96%	1,446	1,455.84	1,458.84	1,479.84	1,493.84	1,519.56	1,568.56	1,609.04	1,623.04	1,702	1,727	1,928.44
DUP	Alexander McMeekin	6.01%	872	872	884	957	976.24	978.24	990.24	1,010.24	1,493.24	1,523.48	1,525.48	1,650.72
Vanguard	Raymond Jordan	5.37%	780	784.32	788.32	825.56	876.56	882.56	914.56	963.8	1,022.8	1,068.04	1,072.04	
SDLP	Mary Scott	6.36%	923	937.4	938.4	938.4	950.4	992.4	994.4	996.4	997.4	999.4		
UUP	John William Kennedy*	4.34%	630	634.08	635.08	657.08	665.08	672.08	726.08	952.04	975.04			
DUP	William Spence	4.16%	604	604	607	629	667	673	691	697				
UUP	John Gilmore	4.26%	619	624.76	626.76	639.76	652.76	660.76	682.76					
Ind. Unionist	John Webster*	2.34%	340	340.96	343.96	349.2	369.2	371.2						
NI Labour	Ronald Macartney	2.27%	330	335.76	335.76	336.76	348.76							
Independent	William Weir	2.16%	313	313.72	314.72	319.72								
UUUP	Reginald Johnston	1.37%	199	199.96	276.96									
UUUP	James Robinson	0.82%	119	119										
Electorate: 29,635 Valid: 14,518 (48.99%) Spoilt: 523 Quota: 2,075 Turnout: 15,041 (50.75%)

== 1973 Election ==
1973: 4 x UUP, 2 x Alliance

Area C - 6 seats
Party	Candidate	FPv%	Count								
Party	Candidate	FPv%	1	2	3	4	5	6	7	8	9
Alliance	David Cook	10.60%	2,241	2,254	2,327	2,360	2,584	3,027			
UUP	John Webster	13.11%	2,770	2,771	2,771	2,946	2,952	2,985	3,023		
Alliance	Muriel Pritchard	5.55%	1,172	1,174	1,176	1,198	1,427	1,757	2,279	3,158	
UUP	F. J. McGibben	10.63%	2,247	2,247	2,247	2,278	2,296	2,314	2,355	2,364	3,114
UUP	John William Kennedy	12.35%	2,611	2,616	2,618	2,648	2,660	2,678	2,743	2,753	3,113
UUP	W. D. Gilmore	11.93%	2,522	2,525	2,528	2,616	2,626	2,645	2,726	2,741	3,003
United Loyalist	N. McNarry	8.01%	1,693	1,694	1,697	1,794	1,797	1,806	1,857	1,871	1,926
UUP	N. Preston	6.64%	1,404	1,404	1,404	1,420	1,424	1,432	1,453	1,464	
SDLP	Mary Scott	4.49%	948	949	1,149	1,160	1,177	1,197	1,413		
NI Labour	Brian Garrett	3.87%	817	957	1,029	1,077	1,103	1,146			
Alliance	William Jeffrey	3.46%	731	737	745	800	948				
Alliance	W. McDonough	3.22%	681	683	685	699					
Independent	D. Donaghy	2.87%	610	614	639						
Republican Clubs	P. Callaghan	2.38%	503	508							
NI Labour	W. Copley	0.88%	186								
Electorate: 32,071 Valid: 21,136 (65.90%) Spoilt: 210 Quota: 3,020 Turnout: 21,346 (66.56%)
