= Belfast Area H =

Former district electoral area in Northern Ireland (1973–1985)

Area H was one of the eight district electoral areas (DEA) which existed in Belfast, Northern Ireland from 1973 to 1985. Located in the north of the city, it covered the Antrim and Shore Road areas, together with parts of the Cliftonville area. The district elected seven members to Belfast City Council and contained the wards of Bellevue, Castleview; Cavehill, Cliftonville; Duncairn; Fortwilliam; and Grove. The DEA largely formed part of the Belfast North constituency.

== History ==
The area was created for the 1973 local government elections. It combined the whole of the former Duncairn ward with part of the Clifton ward and parts of Newtownabbey Urban District. It was abolished for the 1985 local government elections. The Cliftonville ward became part of the new Oldpark DEA. The remaining six wards became the Castle DEA.

== Councillors ==
Election	Councillor (Party)	Councillor (Party)	Councillor (Party)	Councillor (Party)	Councillor (Party)	Councillor (Party)	Councillor (Party)
1984 by-election	Frank Millar (Independent Unionist)/ (UUP)	John Carson (UUP)	Raymond Trimble (UUP)	Alfie Redpath (Ulster Unionist Party)	William Gault (DUP)	John Cushnahan (Alliance)	Paschal O'Hare (SDLP)
1981	Frank Millar (Independent Unionist)/ (UUP)	John Carson (UUP)	Raymond Trimble (UUP)	William Annon (DUP)	William Gault (DUP)	John Cushnahan (Alliance)	Paschal O'Hare (SDLP)
1977	Frank Millar (Independent Unionist)/ (UUP)	John Carson (UUP)	Myles Humphreys (UUP)	William Annon (DUP)	Robert Jamison (Alliance)	John Cushnahan (Alliance)	Paschal O'Hare (SDLP)
1973	Frank Millar (Independent Unionist)/ (UUP)	John Carson (UUP)	Myles Humphreys (UUP)	Mary Creighton (UUP)	W. Shannon (UUP)	John Ferguson (Alliance)	Thomas Donnelly (SDLP)

== 1984 by-election ==
Following the death of the DUP's William Annon in October 1983, a by-election was held on 23 February 1984.

Area H by-election
Party	Candidate	Count 1	Count 2	Count 3	Count 4
UUP	Alfie Redpath	2635	2648	2991	3307
SDLP	M. Rodgers	1256	1439	1442	1847
DUP	Eveline Thompson	1038	1045	1244	1268
Alliance	Tom Campbell	811	947	987	
Ind. Unionist	Nelson McCausland	647	663		
Workers' Party	Kathy Johnston	474			
Ulster Liberal	T. Shaw	20			

== 1981 Election ==
1977: 2 x UUP, 2 x Alliance, 1 x SDLP, 1 x DUP, 1 x Independent Unionist

1981: 2 x UUP, 2 x DUP, 1 x SDLP, 1 x Alliance, 1 x Independent Unionist

1977-1981 Change: DUP gain from Alliance

Area H - 7 seats
Party	Candidate	FPv%	Count								
Party	Candidate	FPv%	1	2	3	4	5	6	7	8	9
UUP	John Carson*	25.37%	5,014								
SDLP	Paschal O'Hare*	15.47%	3,057								
DUP	William Annon*	15.23%	3,010								
Ind. Unionist	Frank Millar*	9.35%	1,848	2,438.07	2,438.64	2,464.2	2,581.2				
Alliance	John Cushnahan*	8.80%	1,739	1,881.8	1,918.09	1,923.85	1,928.54	1,928.54	2,046.59	2,500.59	
UUP	Raymond Trimble	2.06%	408	1,729.92	1,729.92	1,736.58	1,770.19	1,782.19	1,786.19	1,978.92	2,295.92
DUP	William Gault	4.11%	813	990.48	990.48	1,423.38	1,506	1,530	1,532.87	1,993.65	2,239.65
SDLP	Alban Maginness	4.14%	818	829.22	1,336.52	1,336.52	1,336.52	1,336.52	1,593.23	1,613.71	1,723.71
NI Labour	Alan Carr	5.06%	1,000	1,091.8	1,095.6	1,110.54	1,231.25	1,246.25	1,334.79	1,397.21	
Alliance	Robert Jamison*	2.69%	531	646.26	651.58	653.2	655.2	659.2	676.84		
DUP	Pauline Strong	2.36%	466	510.37	510.37	555.01	611.88	630.88	630.88		
Republican Clubs	Liam Clarke	2.80%	553	560.14	579.52	580.42	580.42	580.42			
PUP	David Overend	2.55%	503	520.85	521.04	524.1					
Electorate: 33,505 Valid: 19,760 (58.98%) Spoilt: 720 Quota: 2,471 Turnout: 20,480 (61.13%)

== 1977 Election ==
1973: 5 x UUP, 1 x Alliance, 1 x SDLP

1977: 2 x UUP, 2 x Alliance, 1 x SDLP, 1 x DUP, 1 x Independent Unionist

1977-1981 Change: Alliance, DUP and Independent Unionist gain from UUP (three seats)

Area H - 7 seats
Party	Candidate	FPv%	Count											
Party	Candidate	FPv%	1	2	3	4	5	6	7	8	9	10	11	12
SDLP	Paschal O'Hare	14.52%	2,414											
Ind. Unionist	Frank Millar*	13.96%	2,321											
UUP	John Carson*	13.53%	2,250											
UUP	Myles Humphreys*	11.68%	1,942	1,942.14	2,000.11	2,016.76	2,073.53	2,360.53						
Alliance	John Cushnahan	11.21%	1,865	1,881.1	1,883.19	1,885.3	1,887.4	1,896.08	1,901.08	1,902.19	2,104.19			
DUP	William Annon	9.06%	1,507	1,507.14	1,561.59	1,590.34	1,597.55	1,608.82	1,613.82	2,041.03	2,048.37	2,064.18	2,290.18	
Alliance	Robert Jamison	5.68%	944	951.14	956.75	959.75	961.15	977.02	990.02	995.79	1,116.18	1,323.08	1,680.41	1,770.41
SDLP	Alban Maginness	6.61%	1,099	1,406.44	1,406.99	1,407.99	1,408.2	1,408.2	1,409.2	1,409.42	1,444.26	1,445.26	1,451.31	1,461.31
UUP	Mary Creighton*	1.99%	331	331	367.85	399.16	469.65	577.41	821.41	848.99	925.06	1,160.88		
Unionist Party NI	Joseph Gibson	2.78%	462	462.14	472.48	482.7	486.69	506.04	515.04	522.41	546.63			
NI Labour	Alan Carr	3.02%	502	504.24	508.97	513.41	515.23	517.34	518.34	519.74				
DUP	Cynthia McDowell	2.65%	441	441	472.13	484.46	486.77	492.07	495.07					
UUP	James Kennett	2.64%	439	439	455.17	458.83	466.39							
Dominion Party	Alexander Beattie	0.69%	114	114	124.78									
Electorate: 35,074 Valid: 16,631 (47.42%) Spoilt: 684 Quota: 2,079 Turnout: 17,315 (49.37%)

== 1973 Election ==
1973: 5 x UUP, 1 x Alliance, 1 x SDLP

Area H - 7 seats
Party	Candidate	FPv%	Count															
Party	Candidate	FPv%	1	2	3	4	5	6	7	8	9	10	11	12	13	14	15	16
UUP	John Carson	22.24%	5,518															
UUP	Frank Millar	16.09%	3,993															
SDLP	Thomas Donnelly	10.75%	2,667	2,668.32	2,669.01	2,671.01	2,701.24	2,701.24	2,934.24	2,956.91	2,989.91	3,013.91	3,162.91					
Alliance	John Ferguson	9.15%	2,271	2,325.12	2,336.12	2,347.92	2,370.15	2,384.26	2,389.26	2,424.69	2,474.68	2,805.17	3,160.17					
UUP	Myles Humphreys	7.80%	1,935	2,443.64	2,583.48	2,609.11	2,613.78	2,637.6	2,637.83	2,656.64	2,668.86	2,686.42	2,706.16	2,706.74	2,998.55	3,215.55		
UUP	Mary Creighton	2.94%	730	1,792.16	1,974.32	1,987.98	1,995.32	2,026.6	2,026.6	2,051.29	2,064.96	2,078.18	2,157.54	2,158.12	2,489.68	2,892.62	3,127.62	
UUP	W. Shannon	5.09%	1,263	1,471.56	1,585.41	1,592.28	1,598.11	1,616.52	1,616.52	1,622.98	1,631.53	1,640.64	1,648.08	1,648.08	1,908.68	2,187.26	2,291.6	2,359.61
UUP	H. E. Smith	5.02%	1,245	1,379.64	1,444.04	1,455.27	1,464.82	1,478.61	1,478.61	1,485.95	1,500.73	1,526.05	1,540.72	1,542.16	1,715.71	1,965.18	2,162.03	2,207.17
Alliance	Maureen McManus	3.93%	974	980.16	981.31	983.31	1,003.31	1,010.75	1,013.75	1,027.19	1,075.19	1,406.39	1,566.17	1,621.85	1,638.53	1,657.53		
Ulster Constitution Party	David Riddelsdell	3.90%	967	1,045.76	1,199.4	1,204.72	1,209.95	1,252.8	1,254.8	1,258.47	1,262.14	1,263.81	1,280.59	1,281.17	1,359.64			
UUP	W. Lavery	2.78%	689	967.96	1,132.64	1,141.22	1,146.22	1,157.4	1,157.63	1,168.22	1,185.46	1,195.79	1,218	1,219.16				
NI Labour	S. Barbour	1.74%	432	442.56	446.01	448.01	456.01	456.01	474.01	602.58	905.73	923.17						
Alliance	Hannah Lantin	2.82%	700	710.56	713.55	729.99	741.99	745.99	746.99	762.66	791.77							
NI Labour	Mary Simpson	1.64%	407	416.68	420.82	420.82	441.28	441.95	452.95	544.5								
NI Labour	B. Boyd	1.32%	327	341.96	350.93	351.93	367.81	372.81	379.81									
Republican Labour	B. Loughran	1.12%	277	277	277.46	280.46	288.46	288.46										
Ind. Unionist	J. N. McCauley	0.52%	129	148.36	160.32	181.47	184.47											
Ulster Liberal	R. A. Smith	0.69%	172	175.96	178.72	180.72												
Independent	S. Daly	0.47%	115	126.88	134.7													
Electorate: 37,491 Valid: 24,811 (66.18%) Spoilt: 333 Quota: 3,102 Turnout: 25,144 (67.07%)
