= Belfast Area G =

Electoral division in Belfast, Northern Ireland

Area G was one of the eight district electoral areas (DEA) which existed in Belfast, Northern Ireland from 1973 to 1985. Covering Belfast city centre and the inner parts of the north and west of the city, the district elected six members to Belfast City Council and contained the wards of Central; Court; Crumlin; New Lodge; North Howard; and Shankill. The DEA formed part of the Belfast North and Belfast West constituencies.

== History ==
The area was created for the 1973 local government elections. It combined the whole of the former Court and Dock wards with parts of the Clifton, Shankill, Smithfield and Woodvale wards. It was abolished for the 1985 local government elections, when it was split between the new Oldpark and Court DEAs.

== Councillors ==
| Election | Councillor (Party) | Councillor (Party) | Councillor (Party) | Councillor (Party) | Councillor (Party) | Councillor (Party) |
|---|---|---|---|---|---|---|
| 1981 | Frederick Ashby (DUP) | Joseph Coggle (DUP) | Cecil Walker (UUP) | Samuel Millar (UDP) | Fergus O'Hare (People's Democracy) | Brian Feeney (SDLP) |
| 1977 | Frederick Ashby (DUP) | Herbert Ditty (UUP) | Cecil Walker (UUP) | Mary McKeown (Alliance) | Seamus Lynch (Republican Clubs) | Gerry Fitt (SDLP) |
| 1973 | Margaret Laird (UUP) | Herbert Ditty (UUP) | Hugh Kidd (UUP) | Mary McKeown (Alliance) | Samuel Millar (Independent Unionist) | Gerry Fitt (SDLP) |

== 1981 Election ==
1977: 2 x UUP, 1 x SDLP, 1 x DUP, 1 x Republican Clubs, 1 x Alliance

1981: 2 x DUP, 1 x UUP, 1 x SDLP, 1 x IRSP, 1 x UDP

1977-1981 Change: DUP, IRSP and UDP gain from UUP, Republican Clubs and Alliance

Area G - 6 seats
| Party | Candidate | FPv% | Count | | | | | | |
| Party | Candidate | FPv% | 1 | 2 | 3 | 4 | 5 | 6 | 7 |
|---|---|---|---|---|---|---|---|---|---|
| DUP | Frederick Ashby* | 20.84% | 2,076 | | | | | | |
| People's Democracy | Fergus O'Hare | 19.60% | 1,953 | | | | | | |
| Ulster Democratic | Samuel Millar | 14.25% | 1,420 | 1,437.36 | | | | | |
| UUP | Cecil Walker* | 11.77% | 1,173 | 1,186.33 | 1,188.09 | 1,233.71 | 1,642.71 | | |
| SDLP | Brian Feeney | 7.52% | 749 | 749.31 | 1,033.55 | 1,102.63 | 1,108.94 | 1,110.6 | 1,419.23 |
| DUP | Joseph Coggle | 3.93% | 392 | 979.76 | 980.64 | 1,000.88 | 1,143.04 | 1,323.15 | 1,375.7 |
| Republican Clubs | Seamus Lynch* | 7.53% | 750 | 750.31 | 899.03 | 941.95 | 944.95 | 946.61 | 1,209.77 |
| Independent Socialist | Gerry Fitt* | 5.43% | 541 | 542.24 | 602.08 | 696.79 | 729.03 | 762.23 | |
| UUP | Herbert Ditty* | 5.97% | 595 | 610.19 | 610.19 | 642.19 | | | |
| Alliance | Philip McGarry | 3.14% | 313 | 315.48 | 348.04 | | | | |
Electorate: 17,207 Valid: 9,962 (57.90%) Spoilt: 374 Quota: 1,424 Turnout: 10,336 (60.07%)

== 1977 Election ==
1973: 3 x UUP, 1 x SDLP, 1 x Alliance, 1 x Independent Unionist

1977: 2 x UUP, 1 x SDLP, 1 x DUP, 1 x Republican Clubs, 1 x Alliance

1973-1977 Change: DUP and Republican Clubs gain from UUP and Independent Unionist

Area G - 6 seats
| Party | Candidate | FPv% | Count | | | | | | |
| Party | Candidate | FPv% | 1 | 2 | 3 | 4 | 5 | 6 | 7 |
|---|---|---|---|---|---|---|---|---|---|
| SDLP | Gerry Fitt* | 29.81% | 3,006 | | | | | | |
| Republican Clubs | Seamus Lynch | 13.12% | 1,323 | 2,124.04 | | | | | |
| Alliance | Mary McKeown* | 3.17% | 320 | 1,051.6 | 1,632.54 | | | | |
| DUP | Frederick Ashby | 13.66% | 1,377 | 1,380.72 | 1,381.34 | 1,383.2 | 1,445.2 | | |
| UUP | Herbert Ditty* | 10.34% | 1,043 | 1,049.2 | 1,050.44 | 1,057.88 | 1,093.74 | 1,203.74 | 1,519.74 |
| UUP | Cecil Walker | 7.73% | 779 | 779.62 | 782.72 | 792.64 | 812.74 | 1,027.38 | 1,318.68 |
| DUP | George Haffey | 7.36% | 742 | 743.24 | 743.24 | 743.86 | 772.86 | 889.1 | 968.72 |
| UUP | Margaret Laird* | 5.87% | 592 | 598.82 | 598.82 | 605.64 | 662.36 | 774.98 | |
| UUP | Samuel Millar* | 5.11% | 515 | 515.62 | 518.72 | 532.36 | 618.84 | | |
| Ind. Unionist | Hugh Kidd* | 3.84% | 387 | 396.92 | 398.16 | 406.22 | | | |
Electorate: 20,959 Valid: 10,084 (48.11%) Spoilt: 886 Quota: 1,441 Turnout: 10,970 (52.34%)

== 1973 Election ==
1973: 3 x UUP, 1 x SDLP, 1 x Alliance, 1 x Independent Unionist

Area G - 6 seats
| Party | Candidate | FPv% | Count | | | | | | | | | | | | | | |
| Party | Candidate | FPv% | 1 | 2 | 3 | 4 | 5 | 6 | 7 | 8 | 9 | 10 | 11 | 12 | 13 | 14 | 15 |
|---|---|---|---|---|---|---|---|---|---|---|---|---|---|---|---|---|---|
| UUP | Margaret Laird | 20.90% | 3,632 | | | | | | | | | | | | | | |
| UUP | Herbert Ditty | 20.46% | 3,556 | | | | | | | | | | | | | | |
| SDLP | Gerry Fitt | 16.55% | 2,876 | | | | | | | | | | | | | | |
| UUP | Hugh Kidd | 15.25% | 2,651 | | | | | | | | | | | | | | |
| Ind. Unionist | Samuel Millar | 13.18% | 2,291 | 3,210.98 | | | | | | | | | | | | | |
| Alliance | Mary McKeown | 3.29% | 572 | 680.68 | 1,104.32 | 1,194 | 1,259.66 | 1,314.91 | 1,315.05 | 1,320.88 | 1,331.8 | 1,334.48 | 1,366.76 | 1,386.81 | 1,408.92 | 1,618.44 | 1,757.85 |
| NI Labour | T. Pakenham | 1.05% | 182 | 240.14 | 552.26 | 670.06 | 677.06 | 723.3 | 724.44 | 727.42 | 757.33 | 738.57 | 860.69 | 867.43 | 882.73 | 1,242.63 | 1,366.79 |
| Republican Clubs | John McAlea | 2.16% | 376 | 376.76 | 384.24 | 385 | 433.86 | 434.37 | 435.93 | 440.35 | 446.91 | 515.49 | 517.33 | 585.17 | 971.62 | 1,029.61 | |
| Republican Clubs | J. Boyle | 2.12% | 368 | 398.02 | 533.34 | 568.3 | 627.66 | 653.16 | 653.86 | 661.66 | 671.64 | 673.79 | 779.83 | 803.97 | 847.81 | | |
| Republican Clubs | F. P. McGlade | 1.67% | 291 | 292.9 | 296.3 | 296.3 | 340.54 | 341.56 | 343.26 | 346.68 | 348.82 | 451.24 | 457.64 | 547.92 | | | |
| Republican Labour | Jim O'Kane | 1.11% | 193 | 193.38 | 194.06 | 194.44 | 277.6 | 277.94 | 295.68 | 305.6 | 315 | 333.75 | 339.57 | | | | |
| NI Labour | Jack Sharkey | 0.76% | 132 | 143.78 | 228.78 | 260.7 | 282.96 | 301.83 | 304.33 | 312.6 | 328.29 | 330.69 | | | | | |
| Republican Clubs | D. O'Hare | 1.00% | 174 | 174.38 | 177.78 | 177.78 | 198.22 | 198.9 | 200.16 | 205 | 206.7 | | | | | | |
| Independent | J. P. Rigby | 0.01% | 13 | 16.42 | 81.7 | 108.3 | 112.08 | 122.62 | 122.76 | 154.57 | | | | | | | |
| Independent | Moya Saunders | 0.03% | 52 | 56.56 | 77.64 | 90.56 | 100.42 | 105.17 | 106.31 | | | | | | | | |
| Republican Labour | H. Scullion | 0.01% | 19 | 19.38 | 20.06 | 20.44 | 31.64 | 31.64 | | | | | | | | | |
Electorate: 29,530 Valid: 17,378 (58.85%) Spoilt: 517 Quota: 2,483 Turnout: 17,895 (60.60%)
