= Belfast Area D =

Electoral division in Belfast, Northern Ireland

Area D was one of the eight district electoral areas (DEA) which existed in Belfast, Northern Ireland from 1973 to 1985. Located in the west of the city, the district elected six members to Belfast City Council and contained the wards of Andersonstown; Ladybrook; Milltown; Saint James; Suffolk; and Whiterock. The DEA largely formed part of the Belfast West constituency.

== History ==
Covering the upper parts of the Falls Road areas, the DEA was created for the 1973 local government elections. It combined most of the former Falls ward with parts of the Saint Anne's ward and parts of the former Lisburn Rural District. It was abolished for the 1985 local government elections. The number of wards in the area had increased to eight. Three of the wards formed part of a new Lower Falls DEA, together with the Falls and Clonard wards, formerly part of Area F. The remaining five wards formed the new Upper Falls DEA.

== Councillors ==
Election	Councillor (Party)	Councillor (Party)	Councillor (Party)	Councillor (Party)	Councillor (Party)	Councillor (Party)
June 1983 by-election	Paddy Devlin (Independent Socialist)/ (SDLP)	Joe Hendron (SDLP)	Cormac Boomer (SDLP)	Mary Muldoon (SDLP)	John McAnulty (People's Democracy)	Alex Maskey (Sinn Féin)
1981	Paddy Devlin (Independent Socialist)/ (SDLP)	Joe Hendron (SDLP)	Cormac Boomer (SDLP)	Mary Muldoon (SDLP)	John McAnulty (People's Democracy)	Gerry Kelly (IRSP)
1977	Paddy Devlin (Independent Socialist)/ (SDLP)	Liam Hunter (SDLP)	Cormac Boomer (SDLP)	Mary Muldoon (SDLP)	Bernard McDonagh (Republican Clubs)	Dan McGuinness (Alliance)
1973	J. Gillespie (SDLP)	Desmond O'Donnell (SDLP)	J. P. McCarron (SDLP)	P. G. Wilson (SDLP)	Raymond O'Hagan (Republican Clubs)	P. D. Corrie (Alliance)

== 1981 Election ==
1977: 4 x SDLP, 1 x Republican Clubs, 1 x Alliance

1981: 3 x SDLP, 1 x People's Democracy, 1 x IRSP, 1 x Independent Socialist

1977-1981 Change: People's Democracy and IRSP gain from Republican Clubs and Alliance, Independent Socialist leaves SDLP

Area D - 6 seats
Party	Candidate	FPv%	Count									
Party	Candidate	FPv%	1	2	3	4	5	6	7	8	9	10
SDLP	Joe Hendron	26.20%	4,291									
People's Democracy	John McAnulty	16.98%	2,781									
SDLP	Cormac Boomer*	12.64%	2,070	2,919.16								
SDLP	Mary Muldoon*	3.88%	636	987.44	1,143.37	1,148.3	1,166.98	1,187.34	1,191.34	1,917.48	1,937.84	2,262.01
Irish Republican Socialist	Gerry Kelly	5.84%	957	1,015.88	1,020.22	1,238.16	1,276.77	1,284.95	1,285.95	1,302.89	2,185.21	2,197.01
Independent Socialist	Paddy Devlin*	8.20%	1,343	1,515.1	1,560.45	1,573.88	1,616	1,659.4	1,668.4	1,741.36	1,787.23	2,058.99
Republican Clubs	Mary McMahon	6.87%	1,125	1,176.52	1,185.2	1,193.87	1,211.85	1,546.39	1,547.39	1,604.52	1,628.3	1,738.82
Alliance	Dan McGuinness*	4.43%	725	781.12	795.69	797.22	883.01	895.93	1,064.93	1,108.6	1,116.83	
Irish Republican Socialist	William Browning	5.02%	822	846.84	854.9	1,012.49	1,041.67	1,046.52	1,049.52	1,066.12		
SDLP	Anne McElroy	2.11%	346	642.7	962.93	974.49	1,008.88	1,034.96	1,040.27			
UUP	John Hand	2.92%	538	538	538.31	538.48	555.48	558.48				
Republican Clubs	Kevin Smyth	2.67%	438	467.9	471.93	476.01	488.35					
Ind. Nationalist	Liam Hunter*	1.02%	167	189.54	192.95	200.77						
Alliance	Robert Turkington	0.84%	137	146.2	146.51	147.36						
Electorate: 35,812 Valid: 16,376 (45.73%) Spoilt: 1,060 Quota: 2,340 Turnout: 17,436 (48.69%)

== 1977 Election ==
1973: 4 x SDLP, 1 x Republican Clubs, 1 x Alliance

1977: 4 x SDLP, 1 x Republican Clubs, 1 x Alliance

1973-1977 Change: No change

Area D - 6 seats
Party	Candidate	FPv%	Count							
Party	Candidate	FPv%	1	2	3	4	5	6	7	8
SDLP	Paddy Devlin*	53.13%	7,087							
SDLP	Cormac Boomer	6.79%	905	2,925.84						
SDLP	Liam Hunter	3.58%	477	1,741.64	2,290.74					
SDLP	Mary Sullivan	5.70%	760	1,669.72	2,006.4					
Alliance	Dan McGuinness	9.26%	1,235	1,612.72	1,664.78	1,827.8	1,891.3	1,915.19		
Republican Clubs	Bernard McDonagh	7.06%	942	1,119.08	1,129.34	1,158.22	1,178.72	1,189.17	1,496.57	1,607.82
Republican Clubs	Martin Lynch	5.42%	723	862.08	873.48	905.02	944.58	955.79	1,228.61	1,338.67
Alliance	Robert Turkington	4.31%	575	660.88	667.34	745.62	762.5	785.68	824.15	
Republican Clubs	Kevin Smyth	3.95%	527	622	629.98	660	675.04	682.45		
Independent Socialist	Gerard Campbell	0.80%	107	187.56	212.64	235.44				
Electorate: 35,266 Valid: 13,338 (37.82%) Spoilt: 1,594 Quota: 1,906 Turnout: 14,932 (42.34%)

== 1973 Election ==
1973: 4 x SDLP, 1 x Alliance, 1 x Republican Clubs

Area D - 6 seats
Party	Candidate	FPv%	Count																			
Party	Candidate	FPv%	1	2	3	4	5	6	7	8	9	10	11	12	13	14	15	16	17	18	19	20
SDLP	J. Gillespie	15.46%	2,306																			
Republican Clubs	Raymond O'Hagan	4.35%	649	649.84	652.84	652.84	652.84	657.84	663.91	791.91	796.91	799.91	985.05	996.26	1,005.47	1,035.47	1,040.75	1,509.82	1,573.78	1,574.78	2,559.38	
SDLP	Desmond O'Donnell	8.93%	1,332	1,360.84	1,364.91	1,366.98	1,371.19	1,383.19	1,394.19	1,402.19	1,406.19	1,414.33	1,416.33	1,471.82	1,690.48	1,728.97	1,760.95	1,776.02	2,114.9	2,115.9	2,138.32	
Alliance	P. D. Corrie	7.77%	1,159	1,162.92	1,163.92	1,164.92	1,167.99	1,174.99	1,175.99	1,177.99	1,184.06	1,266.06	1,268.06	1,351.13	1,366.41	1,386.48	1,656.7	1,668.9	1,698.18	1,810.18	1,853.18	1,819.18
SDLP	J. P. McCarron	5.84%	871	954.09	959.16	963.65	965.72	971.93	979.07	983.07	1,004.21	1,015.95	1,017.42	1,099.96	1,176.73	1,244.36	1,272.78	1,286.13	1,493.21	1,498.21	1,566.26	1,701.26
SDLP	P. G. Wilson	7.24%	1,080	1,087.14	1,088.14	1,091.14	1,097.14	1,104.35	1,108.4	1,112.42	1,136.49	1,145.7	1,152.7	1,183.7	1,294.75	1,332.96	1,356.1	1,383.17	1,532.53	1,553.53	1,572.53	1,687.53
Alliance	Reginald Donnelly	5.52%	822	825.29	827.29	828.29	832.29	838.29	839.29	847.29	849.36	923.43	924.43	986.57	1,005.64	1,023.92	1,364.48	1,375.55	1,396.76	1,441.76	1,468.83	1,483.83
Republican Clubs	John Brady	5.08%	758	758.91	765.91	773.05	774.05	775.05	787.19	866.19	888.86	889.26	945.26	955.47	963.47	1,136.89	1,143.89	1,383.03	1,412.1	1,412.1		
UUP	A. W. Shaw	7.01%	1,045	1,045.07	1,045.07	1,046.07	1,046.07	1,049.07	1,050.07	1,050.07	1,050.07	1,052.07	1,052.07	1,057.07	1,058.07	1,059.07	1,065.14	1,066.14	1,066.14			
SDLP	A. McKenna	3.55%	530	541.97	548.97	562.11	565.11	568.11	672.18	676.18	680.18	701.39	709.39	730.88	808.37	851.72	878.14	909.21				
Republican Clubs	Ethel McAllister	4.59%	684	684.56	686.56	691.7	691.7	691.7	692.7	709.7	727.84	729.84	818.84	826.05	832.05	861.12	866.12					
Alliance	A. J. McGrogan	3.82%	569	572.01	573.08	573.08	579.15	585.22	585.22	586.22	588.22	691.29	698.29	754.36	764.36	772.71						
Republican Labour	D. Barnes	2.41%	360	362.66	376.66	388.73	389.73	392.73	451.73	454.73	592.8	596.94	607.01	634.08	652.15							
SDLP	O'Connor	3.51%	524	529.32	532.32	533.32	534.32	537.32	543.6	544.6	550.6	557.67	565.74	583.81								
NI Labour	T. Hannon	2.19%	326	329.64	330.64	334.64	362.64	501.64	508.64	508.64	526.71	538.71	539.71									
Republican Clubs	Bernard McDonagh	2.28%	340	340.21	343.21	346.42	346.42	346.42	346.49	369.49	378.56	381.56										
Alliance	Monica Slavin	2.23%	332	332.98	334.05	336.05	341.12	345.12	350.12	351.12	353.12											
Republican Labour	J. Flanigan	1.62%	241	241.84	248.84	275.84	275.84	277.84	299.84	303.84												
Republican Clubs	J. J. McElroy	1.85%	276	276.07	281.07	283.07	283.07	285.07	291.07													
Republican Labour	J. J. McNamee	1.72%	256	256.7	264.84	269.84	271.91	272.91														
NI Labour	R. Watson	1.13%	169	169.56	170.56	171.56	220.63															
NI Labour	P. Moyna	0.73%	109	109.63	112.63	112.7																
Republican Labour	J. Lavelle	0.60%	90	91.26	97.33																	
Republican Labour	F. McDermott	0.58%	86	86.49																		
Electorate: 34,437 Valid: 14,914 (43.31%) Spoilt: 1,001 Quota: 2,131 Turnout: 15,915 (46.21%)
