= Belfast Area E =

Electoral division in Belfast, Northern Ireland

Area E was one of the eight district electoral areas (DEA) which existed in Belfast, Northern Ireland from 1973 to 1985. Located in the north-west of the city, the district elected six members to Belfast City Council and contained the wards of Ardoyne; Ballygomartin; Ballysillan; Highfield; Legoniel; and Woodvale. The DEA formed part of the Belfast North and Belfast West constituencies.

== History ==
The area was created for the 1973 local government elections, combining most of the former Shankill ward and parts of the former Woodvale and Clifton wards with parts of the former Antrim Rural District. It was abolished for the 1985 local government elections. The Ardoyne, Ballysillan and Legoniel wards became part of a new Oldpark DEA, while the remaining wards formed part of the new Court DEA.

== Councillors ==
Election	Councillor (Party)	Councillor (Party)	Councillor (Party)	Councillor (Party)	Councillor (Party)	Councillor (Party)
1981	Hugh Smyth (PUP)/ (Independent Unionist)	Billy Bell (UUP)	Alfie Ferguson (UUP)	George Haffey (DUP)	George Seawright (DUP)	Laurence Kennedy (Anti H-Block)
1977	Hugh Smyth (PUP)/ (Independent Unionist)	Billy Bell (UUP)	Alfie Ferguson (UUP)	Fred Proctor (DUP)	James Weir (Independent)	Samuel Egerton (Alliance)
1973	Hugh Smyth (PUP)/ (Independent Unionist)	David Smylie (United Loyalist)	William Christie (UUP)	Fred Proctor (DUP)	Billy Boyd (NILP)	James Robinson (Alliance)

== 1981 Election ==
1977: 2 x UUP, 1 x DUP, 1 x Alliance, 1 x Independent, 1 x Independent Unionist

1981: 2 x DUP, 2 x UUP, 1 x PUP, 1 x Anti H-Block

1977-1981 Change: DUP and Anti H-Block gain from Alliance and Independent, Independent Unionist joins PUP

Area E - 6 seats
Party	Candidate	FPv%	Count											
Party	Candidate	FPv%	1	2	3	4	5	6	7	8	9	10	11	12
DUP	George Haffey	23.73%	4,142											
UUP	Billy Bell*	17.79%	3,105											
DUP	George Seawright	11.39%	1,989	3,442.6										
PUP	Hugh Smyth*	11.06%	1,931	1,957	2,177.72	2,204.72	2,220.72	2,229.72	2,231.92	2,234.12	2,311.85	2,316.36	2,548.36	
UUP	Alfie Ferguson*	2.10%	367	395.4	625.42	989.62	990.24	1,016.79	1,017.3	1,019.1	1,375.09	1,380.69	1,789.06	2,200.15
Anti H-Block	Laurence Kennedy	6.13%	1,070	1,070	1,070	1,070	1,092	1,100.2	1,184.2	1,510	1,510	1,890	1,892.86	1,904.97
Alliance	Samuel Egerton*	5.79%	1,011	1,017.8	1,033.92	1,062.72	1,090.92	1,165.83	1,169.83	1,186.83	1,207.67	1,500.67	1,569.39	1,706.56
Ulster Democratic	Samuel Doyle	6.50%	1,135	1,164.2	1,257.82	1,293.42	1,294.42	1,312.53	1,316.24	1,318.44	1,359.66	1,367.28	1,481.88	
Ind. Unionist	Fred Proctor*	3.96%	692	754.4	982.56	1,032.36	1,032.36	1,046.89	1,050.29	1,053.2	1,129.37	1,130.88		
SDLP	Alphonsus Maginness	3.54%	618	618	618.62	619.42	663.42	678.42	719.42	863.82	864.44			
UUP	James Sands	2.21%	386	413.2	546.81	639.61	640.61	655.16	656.16	657.16				
Independent	Patrick Hunter	1.84%	321	324.2	324.82	325.62	332.62	345.13	524.13					
Independent	James Weir*	1.78%	311	311.8	313.35	313.95	322.95	329.95						
Independent	Peter Emerson	1.16%	202	203.6	214.45	220.45	232.76							
Republican Clubs	Margaret McNulty	1.01%	177	177	178.86	179.06								
Electorate: 28,598 Valid: 17,457 (61.04%) Spoilt: 624 Quota: 2,494 Turnout: 18,081 (63.22%)

== 1977 Election ==
1973: 1 x UUP, 1 x DUP, 1 x NILP, 1 x Alliance, 1 x United Loyalist, 1 x Independent Unionist

1977: 2 x UUP, 1 x DUP, 1 x Alliance, 1 x Independent, 1 x Independent Unionist

1973-1977 Change: UUP and Independent gain from NILP and United Loyalist

Area E - 6 seats
Party	Candidate	FPv%	Count								
Party	Candidate	FPv%	1	2	3	4	5	6	7	8	9
UUP	Billy Bell	24.38%	3,297								
Independent	James Weir	16.15%	2,184								
DUP	Fred Proctor*	12.98%	1,755	1,860.84	1,873.52	1,874.36	1,898.12	2,512.12			
Alliance	Samuel Egerton	9.04%	1,223	1,263.32	1,352.32	1,497.22	1,506.88	1,513.84	1,518.84	1,561.28	2,084.28
UUP	Alfie Ferguson	2.71%	366	1,106.04	1,118.98	1,123.04	1,323.24	1,366.76	1,497.76	1,566.38	1,748.98
Ind. Unionist	Hugh Smyth*	8.43%	1,140	1,174.44	1,179.44	1,180.42	1,214.98	1,240.58	1,353.58	1,657.4	1,714.82
UUP	David Smylie*	4.93%	667	798.46	811.88	812.16	1,062.46	1,109.5	1,249.5	1,390.36	1,501.78
NI Labour	George Chambers	5.98%	809	872.84	930.52	998.84	1,022.92	1,031.32	1,051.32	1,108.2	
Independent	Hugh Stockman	5.31%	718	741.94	767.36	785.98	801.98	822.08	891.08		
DUP	Bill Lavery	5.29%	715	760.78	765.88	767.42	784.94				
UUP	James Sands	3.05%	412	577.48	859.58	590.56					
Independent	Peter Emerson	1.75%	236	248.6							
Electorate: 30,109 Valid: 13,522 (44.91%) Spoilt: 706 Quota: 1,932 Turnout: 14,228 (47.25%)

== 1973 Election ==
1973: 1 x UUP, 1 x DUP, 1 x NILP, 1 x Alliance, 1 x United Loyalist, 1 x Independent Unionist

Area E - 6 seats
Party	Candidate	FPv%	Count							
Party	Candidate	FPv%	1	2	3	4	5	6	7	8
UUP	William Christie	39.88%	7,875							
DUP	Fred Proctor	10.92%	2,156	3,413.95						
Ind. Unionist	Hugh Smyth	10.86%	2,145	3,131.7						
NI Labour	Billy Boyd	8.90%	1,758	2,439.85	2,485.73	2,518.7	2,554.11	2,808.9	2,879.9	
United Loyalist	David Smylie	6.13%	1,210	1,761.2	2,295.1	2,463.53	2,556.84	2,578.66	2,581.61	3,030.61
Alliance	James Robinson	7.35%	1,452	2,003.85	2,051.95	2,071.27	2,104.13	2,183.45	2,216.75	2,487.35
SDLP	J. P. Goan	5.12%	1,012	1,016.55	1,018.03	1,018.03	1,018.03	1,388.98	1,974.63	1,985.47
DUP	K. B. Hoy	2.60%	514	1,110.05	1,247.32	1,309.48	1,352.84	1,376.8	1,380.8	
Republican Labour	T. Fleming	4.26%	842	845.25	845.25	845.25	845.9	870.9		
SDLP	P. J. Tanney	2.19%	432	433.3	433.67	434.3	434.51			
NI Labour	George Chambers	1.34%	264	338.1	346.24	349.6	358.59			
Independent	J. Moore	0.45%	88	208.25	223.79	236.81				
Electorate: 31,548 Valid: 19,748 (62.60%) Spoilt: 267 Quota: 2,822 Turnout: 20,015 (63.44%)
