= Belfast Area B =

Electoral division in Belfast, Northern Ireland

Area B was one of the eight district electoral areas (DEA) which existed in Belfast, Northern Ireland from 1973 to 1985. Located in the east of the city, the district elected seven members to Belfast City Council and contained the wards of Ballyhackamore; Belmont; Bloomfield; Island; Knock; Shandon; and Stormont. The DEA formed part of the Belfast East constituency.

== History ==
The area was created for the 1973 local government elections, combining the whole of the former Victoria ward with just under half of the former Pottinger ward. It was abolished for the 1985 local government elections, for which an eighth ward had been created in the area. The Bloomfield ward became part of a new Pottinger DEA, while the remaining seven wards formed the Victoria DEA.

== Councillors ==
Election	Councillor (Party)	Councillor (Party)	Councillor (Party)	Councillor (Party)	Councillor (Party)	Councillor (Party)	Councillor (Party)
1981	Michael Brown (Alliance)	Oliver Napier (Alliance)	Joshua Cardwell (UPNI)/ (UUP)	Thomas Patton (UUP)	William Corry (UUP)	Bill Morrison (DUP)	Henry Evans (DUP)
1977	Michael Brown (Alliance)	Oliver Napier (Alliance)	Joshua Cardwell (UPNI)/ (UUP)	Thomas Patton (UUP)	Dorothy Dunlop (UUP)	John Allen (UUP)	Henry Evans (DUP)
1973	Michael Brown (Alliance)	H. K. Dickey (United Loyalist)	Joshua Cardwell (UPNI)/ (UUP)	Thomas Patton (UUP)	William Corry (UUP)	John Allen (UUP)	H. Cranston (UUP)

== 1981 Election ==
1977: 3 x UUP, 2 x Alliance, 1 x DUP, 1 x UPNI

1981: 2 x DUP, 2 x UUP, 1 x Alliance, 1 x UPNI

1977-1981 Change: DUP gain from UUP

Area B - 7 seats
Party	Candidate	FPv%	Count									
Party	Candidate	FPv%	1	2	3	4	5	6	7	8	9	10
Alliance	Oliver Napier*	12.41%	2,631	2,719								
Alliance	Michael Brown*	7.55%	1,602	1,653	1,671	1,706.2	1,923	1,929	2,641.4			
DUP	Henry Evans*	11.85%	2,513	2,513	2,546	2,546	2,554	2,571	2,574	3,090		
DUP	Bill Morrison	10.15%	2,152	2,152	2,201	2,201	2,214	2,243	2,243	2,481	2,765.8	
UUP	Thomas Patton*	9.81%	2,081	2,081	2,195	2,195.8	2,264.8	2,411.8	2,418.8	2,443.8	2,450.92	2,839.92
Unionist Party NI	Joshua Cardwell*	10.97%	2,327	2,336	2,363	2,363.8	2,428.4	2,472.4	2,487.2	2,519.2	2,529.88	2,710.88
UUP	William Corry	8.17%	1,733	1,733	1,737	1,737	1,744	1,919	1,930	1,938	1,944.23	2,703.23
DUP	Samuel Foster	6.90%	1,464	1,465	1,521	1,521	1,525	1,535	1,537	1,695	1,808.92	1,865.92
UUP	Dorothy Dunlop*	5.88%	1,248	1,249	1,261	1,261	1,278	1,452	1,459	1,478	1,490.46	
DUP	Albert Greer	4.62%	979	979	1,009	1,009	1,018	1,026	1,026			
Alliance	Samuel Coulson	3.05%	647	660	663	683	784.6	792.6				
UUP	John Kennedy	2.89%	613	614	620	620	628					
NI Labour	David McKee	2.58%	548	587	602	611.6						
Ulster Democratic	Louis Scott	2.05%	434	439								
SDLP	Peter Prendiville	1.11%	236									
Electorate: 35,901 Valid: 21,208 (59.07%) Spoilt: 630 Quota: 2,652 Turnout: 21,838 (60.83%)

== 1977 Election ==
1973: 5 x UUP, 1 x Alliance, 1 x United Loyalist

1977: 3 x UUP, 2 x Alliance, 1 x UPNI, 1 x DUP

1973-1977 Change: Alliance, UPNI and DUP gain from UUP (two seats) and United Loyalist

Area B - 7 seats
Party	Candidate	FPv%	Count											
Party	Candidate	FPv%	1	2	3	4	5	6	7	8	9	10	11	12
Unionist Party NI	Joshua Cardwell*	15.11%	2,722											
Alliance	Oliver Napier	15.00%	2,703											
UUP	Thomas Patton*	12.26%	2,209	2,268.58										
Alliance	Michael Brown*	7.55%	2,045	2,120.6	2,350.44									
UUP	John Allen*	10.56%	1,903	1,994.08	2,004.79	2,008.51	2,010.4	2,196.94	2,249.22	2,662.22				
DUP	Henry Evans	5.87%	1,058	1,069.52	1,070.88	1,090.88	1,090.88	1,095.41	1,105.58	1,114.2	1,118.2	1,947.41	2,707.41	
UUP	Dorothy Dunlop	3.45%	622	683.02	691.69	697.77	699.45	934.73	963.93	1,274.06	1,620.06	1,637.13	1,979.01	2,337.01
Alliance	David Wonnacott	4.33%	781	812.5	984.88	989.41	1,073.62	1,083.29	1,487.12	1,524.51	1,535.51	1,541.4	1,573.3	1,595.3
UUUP	Reg Empey	5.44%	981	1,013.22	1,016.11	1,182.4	1,182.75	1,211.09	1,227.99	1,249.29	1,264.29	1,374.54		
DUP	Thomas McIntyre	5.11%	920	927.2	928.05	957.23	957.23	966.59	977.77	982.56	984.56			
UUP	William Corry*	3.69%	664	716.02	722.31	725.67	726.3	817.75	833.09					
NI Labour	William Gunning	3.50%	631	645.76	659.02	660.2	662.93	664.11						
UUP	Joseph Hanna	3.00%	541	562.78	565.16	571.86	572.56							
UUUP	Stanley Morgan	1.32%	237	245.1	246.29									
Electorate: 37,176 Valid: 18,017 (48.46%) Spoilt: 724 Quota: 2,253 Turnout: 18,741 (50.41%)

== 1973 Election ==
1973: 5 x UUP, 1 x Alliance, 1 x United Loyalist

Area B - 7 seats
Party	Candidate	FPv%	Count											
Party	Candidate	FPv%	1	2	3	4	5	6	7	8	9	10	11	12
UUP	Joshua Cardwell	25.41%	6,708											
UUP	John Allen	14.81%	3,910											
United Loyalist	H. K. Dickey	12.77%	3,371											
Alliance	Michael Brown	9.65%	2,549	2,646.41	2,685.56	2,707.71	2,708.93	2,860.37	2,899.56	3,386.56				
UUP	William Corry	5.64%	1,488	2,786.46	3,156.21	3,158.38	3,174.74	3,193.73	3,212.88	3,266.45	3,331.45			
UUP	Thomas Patton	6.94%	1,833	2,274.66	2,305.86	2,310.37	2,332.83	2,342.57	2,354.71	2,372.88	2,490.79	2,491.87	2,498.14	3,223.5
UUP	H. Cranston	4.11%	1,085	1,953.53	2,024.63	2,029.29	2,036.75	2,041.6	2,056.47	2,095.94	2,170.59	2,175.99	2,194.23	3,261.63
Alliance	David Wonnacott	4.56%	1,205	1,241.21	1,243.31	1,260.37	1,260.71	1,536	1,546.59	1,902.65	2,630.45	2,705.33	2,707.04	2,896.56
UUP	Dorothy Dunlop	5.41%	1,428	1,942.59	1,988.64	1,992.3	2,002.48	2,009.67	2,028.6	2,074.11	2,144.78	2,148.56	2,152.55	
NI Labour	William Gunning	2.18%	575	607.64	609.74	795.29	797.43	804.64	1,290.46	1,328.86				
Alliance	Samuel Coulson	3.33%	878	920.84	930.44	936.63	936.99	1,024.69	1,048.94					
NI Labour	H. Conway	1.92%	507	533.52	539.07	626.58	627.76	631.8						
Alliance	P. Miller	2.02%	534	555.93	558.93	566.59	567.13							
NI Labour	W. Kirkpatrick	1.26%	332	343.73	344.63									
Electorate: 39,227 Valid: 26,403 (67.31%) Spoilt: 385 Quota: 3,301 Turnout: 26,788 (68.29%)
