= Andrew Cairns (politician) =

Former High Sheriff of Belfast

High Sheriff of Belfast
- In office January 1985 – January 1986
- Preceded by: Pauline Whitley
- Succeeded by: Herbert Ditty

Member of Belfast City Council
- In office 18 May 1977 – 15 May 1985
- Preceded by: F. J. McKibben
- Succeeded by: District abolished
- Constituency: Belfast Area C

Personal details
- Born: 1912/1913; Belfast, Northern Ireland
- Political party: Ulster Unionist

Andrew Cairns was an Ulster Unionist Party (UUP) politician who was High Sheriff of Belfast from January 1985 to 1986, as well as a Belfast City Councillor for the Belfast Area C DEA from 1977 to 1985.

== Background ==
Cairns was first elected onto Belfast City Council at the 1977 local elections, representing the Area C District.
