= Belfast Area F =

Electoral division in Belfast, Northern Ireland

Area F was one of the eight district electoral areas (DEA) which existed in Belfast, Northern Ireland from 1973 to 1985. Containing the inner parts of west and south Belfast, the district elected six members to Belfast City Council and contained the wards of Clonard; Cromac; Donegall; Falls; Grosvenor; and Saint George's wards. Most of the DEA formed part of the Belfast West constituency, with a small part in Belfast South.

== History ==
The area was created for the 1973 local government elections. It contained the whole of the former Saint George's ward, centred on the Sandy Row area. It also contained smaller sections of the former Cromac, Falls, Saint Anne's and Smithfield wards. It was abolished for the 1985 local government elections. The depopulated Falls and Grosvenor wards were merged to form a single Falls ward, which, together with Clonard, formed part of the new Lower Falls DEA. The Donegall ward, which was renamed Blackstaff in 1985, became part of the Balmoral DEA. The Cromac and Saint George's wards were merged to form the Shaftsbury ward, which became part of the new Laganbank DEA.

== Councillors ==
Election	Councillor (Party)	Councillor (Party)	Councillor (Party)	Councillor (Party)	Councillor (Party)	Councillor (Party)
1984 by-election	William Dickson (DUP)	Eric Smyth (DUP)	James Stewart (UUP)	Will Glendinning (Alliance)	Owen Allen (SDLP)	Sean McKnight (Sinn Féin)
1981	William Dickson (DUP)	Eric Smyth (DUP)	James Stewart (UUP)	Will Glendinning (Alliance)	Owen Allen (SDLP)	Sean Flynn (IRSP)
1977	William Dickson (DUP)	Harry Fletcher (UUP)	James Stewart (UUP)	Will Glendinning (Alliance)	Owen Allen (SDLP)	Jim Sullivan (Republican Clubs)
1973	William Spence (DUP)	Harry Fletcher (UUP)	James Stewart (UUP)	Thomas Murphy (UUP)	Paddy Devlin (SDLP)	Jim Sullivan (Republican Clubs)

== 1984 by-election ==
The by-election was held after Flynn, the IRSP councillor, was disqualified for non-attendance. It was the second seat on Belfast City Council that Sinn Féin won, following a by-election win in Area D in June 1983.

Area F by-election, 28 March 1984
Party	Candidate	Count 1	Count 2	Count 3	Count 4	Count 5
Sinn Féin	Sean McKnight	2981	3027	3216	3216	3624
DUP	Clarke Gibson	1843	1846	1849	3098	3559
UUP	H. Fletcher	1608	1609	1610		
Alliance	Pip Glendinning	1079	1246	1883	2060	
SDLP	Sean Mullan	1040	1153			
Workers' Party	Gerry McCann	691				

== 1981 Election ==
1977: 2 x UUP, 1 x SDLP, 1 x DUP, 1 x Republican Clubs, 1 x Alliance

1981: 2 x DUP, 1 x SDLP, 1 x DUP, 1 x IRSP, 1 x Alliance

1977-1981 Change: DUP and IRSP gain from UUP and Republican Clubs

Area F - 6 seats
Party	Candidate	FPv%	Count									
Party	Candidate	FPv%	1	2	3	4	5	6	7	8	9	10
DUP	William Dickson*	17.80%	1,913									
Irish Republican Socialist	Sean Flynn	15.25%	1,639									
SDLP	Owen Allen*	8.36%	898	898.4	923.88	938.01	1,045.03	1,242.88	1,244.88	1,784.88		
Alliance	Will Glendinning*	7.85%	844	852	865	1,036.69	1,060.21	1,102.06	1,176.59	1,350.01	1,498.97	1,603.97
DUP	Eric Smyth	8.60%	924	1,203.2	1,203.98	1,204.44	1,207.57	1,211.97	1,304.57	1,308.57	1,317.39	1,512.99
UUP	James Stewart*	6.69%	719	742.6	742.86	742.86	742.86	753.99	969.39	969.59	970.57	1,460.35
Republican Clubs	Jim Sullivan*	9.32%	1,002	1,002	1,013.7	1,024.96	1,048.74	1,093.43	1,095.43	1,147.29	1,232.55	1,235.53
UUP	Linda Cust	5.94%	638	663.2	663.33	667.33	667.33	674.93	920.13	921.13	925.05	
SDLP	Maurice Fitzmaurice	6.69%	719	719.4	737.21	739.6	764.29	868.06	869.06			
UUP	Harry Fletcher*	5.78%	621	651	651.13	652.33	652.33	661.73				
SDLP	Mary Smyth	3.62%	389	395.2	406.64	410.16	458.8					
SDLP	Thomas Lappin	2.11%	227	227	243.64	245.9						
Alliance	Paul Maguire	2.00%	215	215.4	219.56							
Electorate: 18,575 Valid: 10,748 (57.86%) Spoilt: 680 Quota: 1,536 Turnout: 11,428 (61.52%)

== 1977 Election ==
1973: 3 x UUP, 1 x SDLP, 1 x DUP, 1 x Republican Clubs

1977: 2 x UUP, 1 x SDLP, 1 x DUP, 1 x Republican Clubs, 1 x Alliance

1973-1977 Change: Alliance gain from UUP

Area F - 6 seats
Party	Candidate	FPv%	Count								
Party	Candidate	FPv%	1	2	3	4	5	6	7	8	9
SDLP	Owen Allen	18.81%	1,886								
UUP	James Stewart*	16.76%	1,681								
Republican Clubs	Jim Sullivan*	10.96%	1,099	1,113.16	1,113.31	1,131.55	1,433.35				
UUP	Harry Fletcher*	10.78%	1,081	1,082.92	1,185.22	1,193.67	1,194.67	1,504.97			
DUP	William Dickson	9.46%	949	958.36	975.01	981.61	982.61	1,009.76	1,474.76		
Alliance	Will Glendinning	10.74%	1,077	1,142.04	1,152.09	1,173.96	1,188.27	1,211.97	1,221.92	1,287.92	1,316.92
SDLP	Thomas Lappin	8.97%	899	1,232.84	1,233.29	1,247.49	1,265.24	1,267.48	1,270.38	1,273.38	1,277.38
DUP	John Parkes	5.24%	525	525.72	534.27	538.57	538.57	575.67			
UUP	Thomas Murphy*	3.68%	369	369.48	470.88	480.88	480,88				
Republican Clubs	Sean O'Hare	3.45%	346	355.12	355.87	369.11					
Communist	James Stewart	1.15%	115	117.4	119.2						
Electorate: 21,177 Valid: 10,027 (47.35%) Spoilt: 1,013 Quota: 1,433 Turnout: 11,040 (52.13%)

== 1973 Election ==
1973: 3 x UUP, 1 x SDLP, 1 x DUP, 1 x Republican Clubs

Area F - 6 seats
Party	Candidate	FPv%	Count															
Party	Candidate	FPv%	1	2	3	4	5	6	7	8	9	10	11	12	13	14	15	16
UUP	Harry Fletcher	21.82%	3,441															
UUP	James Stewart	21.06%	3,320															
UUP	Thomas Murphy	6.34%	1,000	2,049.24	2,971.48													
SDLP	Paddy Devlin	14.22%	2,242	2,242	2,242.64	2,242.96	2,259.96											
Republican Clubs	Jim Sullivan	4.66%	735	735.34	735.66	735.98	740.98	752.98	753.98	753.98	756.98	758.98	772.98	1,072.98	1,072.98	1,461.98	1,691.64	2,419.62
DUP	William Spence	7.55%	1,190	1,286.9	1,389.3	1,768.5	1,771.46	1,776.1	1,779.1	1,796.54	1,796.54	1,797.86	1,808.06	1,859.24	1,860.56	1,861.56	1,935.46	1,939.46
SDLP	Owen Allen	3.01%	475	475.34	475.98	476.3	482.62	493.62	524.62	533.42	536.36	704.56	720.05	804.39	877.39	896.71	1,228.12	1,282.44
Republican Clubs	Sean O'Hare	4.44%	700	700.68	701.64	701.64	705.64	720.64	744.64	747.64	748.13	751.62	751.62	769.94	850.92	1,089.92	1,111.24	
Alliance	Mary Smyth	2.35%	370	376.12	382.2	413.88	416.22	431.9	423.24	448.44	448.44	475.44	693.79	859.69	872.69	876.69		
Republican Clubs	A. Dornan	3.55%	560	560	560.32	560.32	562.32	546.32	595.32	595.32	595.32	595.64	597.64	606.64	681.64			
Republican Clubs	Sean Flynn	3.41%	538	538.34	538.66	538.98	539.98	543.98	556.98	558.98	559.96	573.96	576.96	581.96				
NI Labour	T. Magee	1.47%	232	538.34	538.66	538.98	539.98	543.98	556.98	558.98	559.96	573.96	576.96					
Alliance	P. Woods	1.46%	230	231.02	234.22	249.58	260.58	258.9	258.9	270.82	272.29	285.29						
SDLP	Desmond Gillespie	1.46%	230	231.02	231.02	231.98	234.98	237.98	257.98	265.3	265.79							
NI Labour	W. Ritchie	1.05%	165	170.44	180.36	213.32	213.66	229.98	232.98									
Republican Labour	W. J. Clarke	0.82%	129	129.34	129.34	129.66	179.66	186.66										
Communist	Betty Sinclair	0.70%	110	110.68	111.96	113.88	115.22											
Republican Labour	Margaret McKenna	0.46%	72	72	72.64	73.28												
Republican Labour	J. Marron	0.18%	29	31.72	33.64	33.96												
Electorate: 27,067 Valid: 15,768 (58.26%) Spoilt: 622 Quota: 2,253 Turnout: 16,390 (60.55%)
