= Alfie Ferguson =

British unionist politician

Lord Mayor of Belfast
- In office 1983–1985
- Deputy: Ted Ashby
- Preceded by: Tommy Patton
- Succeeded by: John Carson

High Sheriff of Belfast
- In office 1982–1983
- Preceded by: Muriel Pritchard
- Succeeded by: Donnell Deeny

Member of Belfast City Council
- In office 18 May 1977 – 15 May 1985
- Preceded by: William Christie
- Succeeded by: District abolished
- Constituency: Belfast Area E

Personal details
- Born: 1927 Belfast, Northern Ireland
- Died: 4 December 1992 (aged 64–65)
- Party: Ulster Unionist (until 1989)
- Other political affiliations: Independent Unionist (from 1989)

Alfred Henry "Alfie" Ferguson, CBE (c. 1927 - 4 December 1992) was a British and unionist politician in Northern Ireland. He was a member of the Ulster Unionist Party and served as Lord Mayor of Belfast (1983–85).

== Background ==
Ferguson was an industrial engineer by profession, but from a young age he had an ambition of becoming a councillor. He realised this ambition when he was first elected to Belfast City Hall in 1969. In 1982 he was elected as the 81st High Sheriff of Belfast, and in the following year he was elected Mayor of Belfast. In 1985 he was honoured with a CBE and in 1987 he was made deputy Lord Lieutenant. He was married to Elizabeth, with whom he has three sons. The family were members of the Church of Ireland. Alfie Ferguson died 4 December 1992 at his Crumlin Road home, he was 65.

Civic offices
Preceded by Muriel Pritchard	High Sheriff of Belfast; 1982–1983	Succeeded by Donnell Deeny
Preceded by Tommy Patton	Lord Mayor of Belfast; 1983–1985	Succeeded by John Carson
