= Ben Caraher =

Northern Irish politician (1938–2018)

John Bernard Caraher (1 January 1938 – 21 November 2018), known as Ben Caraher, was a politician in Northern Ireland.

Caraher grew up in Crossmaglen and attended Queen's University Belfast, where he became active in the Irish nationalist New Ireland Society, although he saw himself principally as a supporter of the British Labour Party. He then became a founder member of the National Democratic Party (NDP).

Caraher became a teacher of English and politics, working in a Belfast grammar school. The NDP became part of the new Social Democratic and Labour Party (SDLP), and Caraher immediately became one of its main political theorists. He was part of the team which drafted the party's constitution, organised the Belfast section of the party, and was elected as its first vice-chairman.

Caraher stood unsuccessfully for the SDLP on numerous occasions: in South Belfast at the 1973 Northern Ireland Assembly election; in Belfast Area A at the 1973 Northern Ireland local elections; in the South Belfast Parliament constituency at the February and October 1974 general elections; in the 1975 Northern Ireland Constitutional Convention election in the equivalent Assembly seat; in Belfast Area C at the 1981 Northern Ireland local elections; and finally at the 1982 Northern Ireland Assembly election. It was in 1982 that he came closest to winning a seat, taking fourth place, but narrowly missing out on transfers.

At the 1985 Northern Ireland local elections, Caraher acted as election agent for Dorita Field, who stood unsuccessfully in the Balmoral area.
