= William Christie (Ulster politician) =

Politician and businessman in Northern Ireland

Sir William Christie

33rd Lord Mayor of Belfast
- In office 1972–1975
- Preceded by: Joseph Foster Cairns
- Succeeded by: Myles Humphreys

Personal details
- Born: 1 June 1913; Belfast, Ireland
- Died: 10 August 2008 (aged 95)
- Political party: Ulster Unionist Party

Sir William Christie MBE JP DL (1 June 1913 – 10 August 2008) was an Ulster Unionist politician who served as Lord Mayor of Belfast.

The owner of a wallpaper company in Belfast, Christie was Lord Mayor of Belfast between 1972 and 1975. During this time his home and business were attacked several times, and his wife survived a gunshot to the head in 1972. His time in office coincided with the suspension of the Parliament of Northern Ireland, and he was therefore the first Lord Mayor since John White in 1920 not to serve as an ex officio member of the Senate.

In the 1973 elections to Belfast City Council Christie stood in the north-west Belfast 'E' division (equivalent to the current wards of Legoniel, Ballysillan, Ardoyne, Woodvale, Forthriver and Ballygomartin), which elected 6 councillors. He was the only UUP candidate to stand in E and gained 7,875 votes, which equated to 2.8 times the electoral quota. He retired in 1977, and the UUP vote dropped more than 3000 votes. Amongst two UUP councillors elected to replace him was future Lord Mayor Billy Bell.

Civic offices
Preceded by Joseph Foster Cairns	High Sheriff of Belfast; 1964–1965	Succeeded by John Abbott Lewis
Preceded by Joseph Foster Cairns	Lord Mayor of Belfast; 1972–1975	Succeeded by Myles Humphreys
