= Peter Emerson =

Political activist in Northern Ireland

Peter Emerson (born 1943) is a political activist in Northern Ireland.

Born in Britain, Emerson's father was from County Cork, and his mother from Cheshire. He served as a submariner in the Royal Navy, where he was promoted to first lieutenant. In 1970, he began teaching in Nairobi. He moved to Northern Ireland in 1975, living just off the Shankill Road, where he worked in a youth club. There, he became active in the Ulster Liberal Party and also with Friends of the Earth. In 1980, he and Jennifer Fitzgerald were the leading founders of the Campaign for Nuclear Disarmament in Northern Ireland. In 1984, he attracted attention when he broke into a civil defence bunker and obtained papers which appeared to indicate Soviet military targets in the Republic of Ireland.

Emerson stood unsuccessfully as an independent in Area E of Belfast City Council at the 1977 Northern Ireland local elections. In the 1981 elections, Emerson stood as one of three "Ecology" candidates; with 202 votes, he was the most successful, although he did not come close to election. This led him to become one of the most prominent founders of the Ecology Party in the province, in 1983. The party remained extremely small, with only 18 members in 1985, when it renamed as the "Green Party". Emerson stood for it in Oldpark at the 1985 Northern Ireland local elections, then again in 1993, 1997 and 2005.

Emerson also stood for the Greens in Belfast North at the 1997 general election, taking 537 votes, and in the equivalent constituency in the 1982, 1998, 2003 and 2007 Northern Ireland Assembly elections. His best result was in 2007, when he took 590 votes. For the Northern Ireland Forum election in 1996, he not only stood in Belfast North, but also took second place on the party's top-up list. Ultimately, the party placed eleventh across Northern Ireland, leaving it as the best-placed party not to receive two top-up places.

In the 1980s, Emerson was also prominent in the New Ireland Group, and was an organiser of its 1986 "People's Convention". This inspired him to devote time to promoting consensus-based methods of voting, and during the 2010s he was the director of the de Borda Institute, www.deborda.org

== See also ==
- Matrix vote
- Preferendum
- Modified Borda Count
