= Myles Humphreys =

Northern Irish politician

Sir Raymond Evelyn "Myles" Humphreys JP DL (24 March 1925 – 22 February 1998) was a Northern Irish Ulster Unionist Party politician and activist, and an engineer and businessman.

He served as Lord Mayor of Belfast from 1975 to 1977, and later chaired the Northern Irish Police Authority for a decade. He was knighted in the 1977 Silver Jubilee and Birthday Honours, for public service in Belfast.

== Affiliations/positions ==
- 1976: Freeman of the City of London.
- 1946: Northern Ireland Board research engineer
- 1948-1955: Ulster Transport Authority research engineer

== Other affiliations/positions ==
- Belfast Harbour Commissioner
- Senator, Junior Chamber International
- President, Northern Ireland Polio Fellowship
- Chairman, National Housing and Town Planning Council
- High Sheriff of Belfast (1969)
- Senate of Queen's University (1975–77)
- Chairman, Belfast Marathon (1981–85)
- Life member, Railway Preservation Society of Ireland (from 1970 until his death)
- President, City of Belfast Youth Orchestra
- Director, Ulster Orchestra Society (1980–81)
- Northern Ireland Tourist Board (1973–80)
- Chairman, Ulster Tourist Development Association (1968–78)

== Education ==
Humphreys attended Skegoniell Primary School, Londonderry High School and the Belfast Royal Academy.

== Death ==
Sir Myles Humphreys died on 22 February 1998, aged 72, from undisclosed causes.

Civic offices
Preceded by Hugh Brown	High Sheriff of Belfast; 1969–1970	Succeeded by John William Kennedy
Preceded by William Christie	Lord Mayor of Belfast; 1975–1977	Succeeded by James Stewart
