= Thomas Patton =

Politician from Northern Ireland (1914–1993)

High Sheriff of Belfast
- In office 1992–1993
- Preceded by: Joe Coggle
- Succeeded by: Jim Walker

Lord Mayor of Belfast
- In office 1982–1983
- Deputy: Ted Ashby
- Preceded by: Grace Bannister
- Succeeded by: Alfie Ferguson

Member of Belfast City Council
- In office 15 May 1985 – 20 October 1993
- Preceded by: New district
- Succeeded by: Alan Crowe
- Constituency: Victoria
- In office 30 May 1973 – 15 May 1985
- Preceded by: New district
- Succeeded by: District abolished
- Constituency: Belfast Area B

Personal details
- Born: 27 July 1914 Belfast, Northern Ireland
- Died: 20 October 1993 (aged 79)
- Party: Ulster Unionist Party

Thomas William Saunderson Patton OBE (27 July 1914 – 20 October 1993), often known as Tommy Patton, was an Ulster unionist politician.

== Background ==
Patton grew up in Belfast, where he attended the Templemore Avenue School.

He worked at Harland & Wolff for twenty-nine years from 1932, when he moved to the Ulster Folk and Transport Museum.

Thomas was elected to Belfast City Council for the Ulster Unionist Party (UUP) at the 1973 local election. He retired in 1982, but continued to sit on the council, serving as Lord Mayor of Belfast that year. He was appointed as High Sheriff of Belfast for 1992/3.

Journalist Jim McDowell hailed him as “a cornerstone of the unionist working class vote.” Today, his memory lives on in East Belfast at the Alderman Tommy Patton Memorial Park—a tribute to a life built on hard work and service to community.

Civic offices
Preceded by Grace Bannister	Lord Mayor of Belfast; 1982–1983	Succeeded by Alfie Ferguson
Preceded by Joe Coggle	High Sheriff of Belfast; 1992–1993	Succeeded by Jim Walker
