= Grace Bannister =

Northern Irish Unionist politician

Grace Bannister OBE

39th Lord Mayor of Belfast
- In office 1 June 1981 – 1 June 1982
- Deputy: Frank MIllar
- Preceded by: John Carson
- Succeeded by: Thomas Patton

1st Deputy Lord Mayor of Belfast
- In office 1 June 1975 – 1 June 1977
- Preceded by: Office established
- Succeeded by: Dorothy Dunlop

Member of Belfast City Council
- In office 1965–1985

Personal details
- Born: Grace Johnson Ravenhill, Belfast, Northern Ireland
- Party: Ulster Unionist Party
- Spouse: John Bannister (m. 1948)
- Children: 1

Grace Bannister OBE JP (née Johnson; 1924–1986) was a Northern Irish Unionist politician. She was the first female Lord Mayor of Belfast.

== Early life and education ==
Bannister was born in the Ravenhill area of Belfast into a Protestant family, the second child of William H. Collim and Grace Johnston. She had an older sister and three younger brothers. Her grandfather owned a bakery, where her father worked. She was educated at Roslyn Street primary school, Park Parade, and Bloomfield Collegiate School, but left school at age 14 in order to work in the family shop. During the Second World War, she and her siblings were taken out of the city to Ballydrain after a landmine was discovered. To help the war effort, she went to work at Mackie's making parts for Stirling bombers.

In 1948, she married John Bannister. They had one daughter.

== Career ==
Bannister was elected to Belfast Corporation in 1965, representing the Ulster Unionist Party (UUP). She stood as an independent Unionist in Belfast South at the 1973 Northern Ireland Assembly election, after failing to secure an official party nomination. She was not elected and continued to sit with the UUP group on the council.

Bannister served as Deputy Lord Mayor of Belfast in 1975–1976, and in 1979 was appointed High Sheriff of Belfast. In 1981 she was elected as the first female Lord Mayor of Belfast, beating Paddy Devlin and Stewart McCrea.

== Honours ==
Bannister was appointed OBE in the 1984 New Year Honours, for services to local government in Northern Ireland.

Civic offices
New title	Deputy Lord Mayor of Belfast; 1975–1977	Vacant Title next held by Dorothy Dunlop
Preceded by John Carson	High Sheriff of Belfast; 1979–1980	Succeeded by Michael Browne
Preceded by John Carson	Lord Mayor of Belfast; 1981–1982	Succeeded by Thomas Patton
