= Joss Cardwell =

Northern Ireland politician (1910–1982)

Joshua Cardwell, JP (1910–1982) was a Unionist politician in Northern Ireland.

== Early life and career ==
Born in Belfast and educated locally, Cardwell worked as the manager of a coal importing firm. In 1952 he was elected to Belfast Corporation for Victoria Ward and later became an Alderman. During the 1960s Cardwell chaired the committee which was responsible for children's homes in the city. In 1969 he was elected to the Parliament of Northern Ireland for Belfast Pottinger as an 'O'Neill Unionist' supporting the reform proposals of the then Prime Minister. He remained a member until the Parliament was prorogued in 1972. In 1973 he was elected to the Northern Ireland Assembly for Belfast East, as a Unionist pledged to support the former Prime Minister Brian Faulkner. When the Ulster Unionist Party split in 1974, Cardwell became a founder member of the Unionist Party of Northern Ireland and was returned for Belfast East in the 1975 Constitutional Convention election.

He remained a member of Belfast City Council until his death, representing Area B equivalent to the current Ormiston area.

He was unmarried.

== Kincora Boys' Home abuse scandal ==
In March 1982, Cardwell was questioned by police in relation to his visits to Kincora Boys' Home, which had seen a child sex abuse scandal. The Hughes report into the scandal noted that Cardwell told the police of one conversation with the Belfast Town Clerk, who had mentioned an imprecise allegation of homosexual conduct (which at that time would have been illegal in Northern Ireland), but he said that no formal complaint had ever come his way. Shortly after the police interview Cardwell's body was found in a car in the garage of his home in Belfast, and he was found to have died of carbon monoxide poisoning; the coroner stated that the death was "inexplicable". Others regarded it as suicide.

The Hughes report concluded "There is no evidence that Councillor Cardwell took steps to prevent an investigation or suppress the matter." It mentioned that, as a member (and chairman) of the Welfare Committee, Cardwell had statutory visiting responsibilities in relation to homes.

The Joss Cardwell Centre, providing rehabilitation services in East Belfast, was named in his honour but closed in 2007. It burned down in a fire on 9 May 2017.

Parliament of Northern Ireland
Preceded by Tom Boyd	Member of Parliament for Belfast Pottinger; 1969–1973	Parliament abolished
Northern Ireland Assembly (1973)
New assembly	Assembly Member for East Belfast; 1973–1974	Assembly abolished
Northern Ireland Constitutional Convention
New convention	Member for East Belfast; 1975–1976	Convention dissolved
