= Dorothy Dunlop =

Northern Irish politician (1929–2021)

Deputy Lord Mayor of Belfast
- In office 1978–1979
- Preceded by: Vacant
- Succeeded by: Vacant

Member of Belfast City Council
- In office 17 May 1989 – 19 May 1993
- Preceded by: Frank Leslie
- Succeeded by: Robert Cleland
- Constituency: Pottinger
- In office 15 May 1985 – 17 May 1989
- Preceded by: District created
- Succeeded by: Alan Montgomery
- Constituency: Victoria
- In office 1975 – 20 May 1981
- Preceded by: William Corry
- Succeeded by: William Corry
- Constituency: Belfast Area B

Member of the Northern Ireland Assembly for East Belfast
- In office 20 October 1982 – 1986

Personal details
- Born: 1929 Dublin, County Dublin, Irish Free State
- Died: 16 October 2021 (aged 91–92)
- Party: NI Conservative (from 1992); Independent Unionist (1989 - 1992)
- Other political affiliations: Ulster Unionist (until 1989)

Dorothy Dunlop (1929 – 16 October 2021) was a Northern Irish unionist politician, active in East Belfast.

== Background ==
She was born in Dublin in 1929, but her family moved to Belfast when she was just four, after her father, Gilbert Waterhouse, accepted the position of Professor of German at Queen's University. She later completed a BA in English at Queen's, where she met and later married her husband, Samuel Dunlop.

Dunlop worked in the Arts Council in London and for BBC Northern Ireland. After her marriage, she worked as a teacher in various schools and for the Prison Education Service.

She was first elected as an Ulster Unionist Party (UUP) member of Belfast City Council in a by-election in 1975 for 'Area B' (the forerunner to the 'Victoria' electoral area). She was re-elected in 1977 and served as Deputy Lord Mayor in 1978–79. She lost her council seat to the Democratic Unionist Party (DUP) in 1981.

In 1982, she was elected to the Northern Ireland Assembly, one of only three women to win a seat. In 1985, she regained her seat on Belfast City Council, representing the 'Pottinger' area and became chairwoman of East Belfast Unionist Association. On the moderate wing of the UUP, she was critical of the party's electoral pact with the DUP and with Unionist demonstrations at Belfast's Saint Anne's Cathedral against the Anglo-Irish Agreement.

She left the UUP, but retained a sufficient personal vote to hold her council seat in 1989 as an independent Unionist and to retain her deposit with over 2000 votes in East Belfast in the 1992 Westminster election. Shortly afterwards, she joined the Conservative Party, becoming Area Chairwoman 1995–97.

Her political career came to an end when she lost her council seat in the 1993 Local Government elections, her last electoral contest being the 1996 Forum election where she failed to win a seat in Belfast East.

She had four children and seven grandchildren.

She died on 16 October 2021, aged 92.

Civic offices
Vacant Title last held by Grace Bannister	Deputy Lord Mayor of Belfast; 1978–1979	Vacant Title next held by Frank Millar
Northern Ireland Assembly (1982)
New assembly	MPA for East Belfast; 1982–1986	Assembly abolished
