= Belfast West by-election =

Belfast West by-election may refer to one of four by-elections held for the British House of Commons constituency of Belfast West, in Northern Ireland:

- 1903 Belfast West by-election
- 1943 Belfast West by-election
- 1950 Belfast West by-election
- 2011 Belfast West by-election
