= 2011 Belfast West by-election =

2011 UK parliamentary by-election

- 9 June 2011
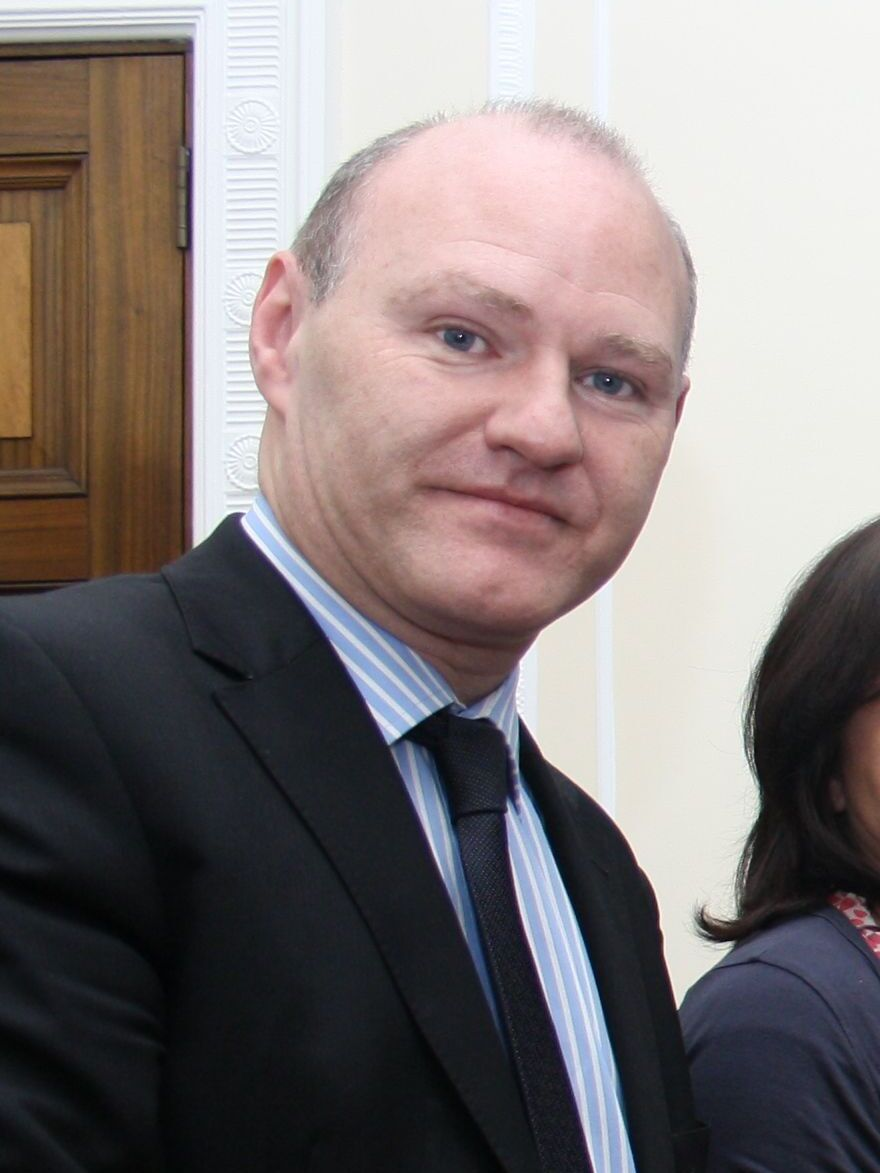

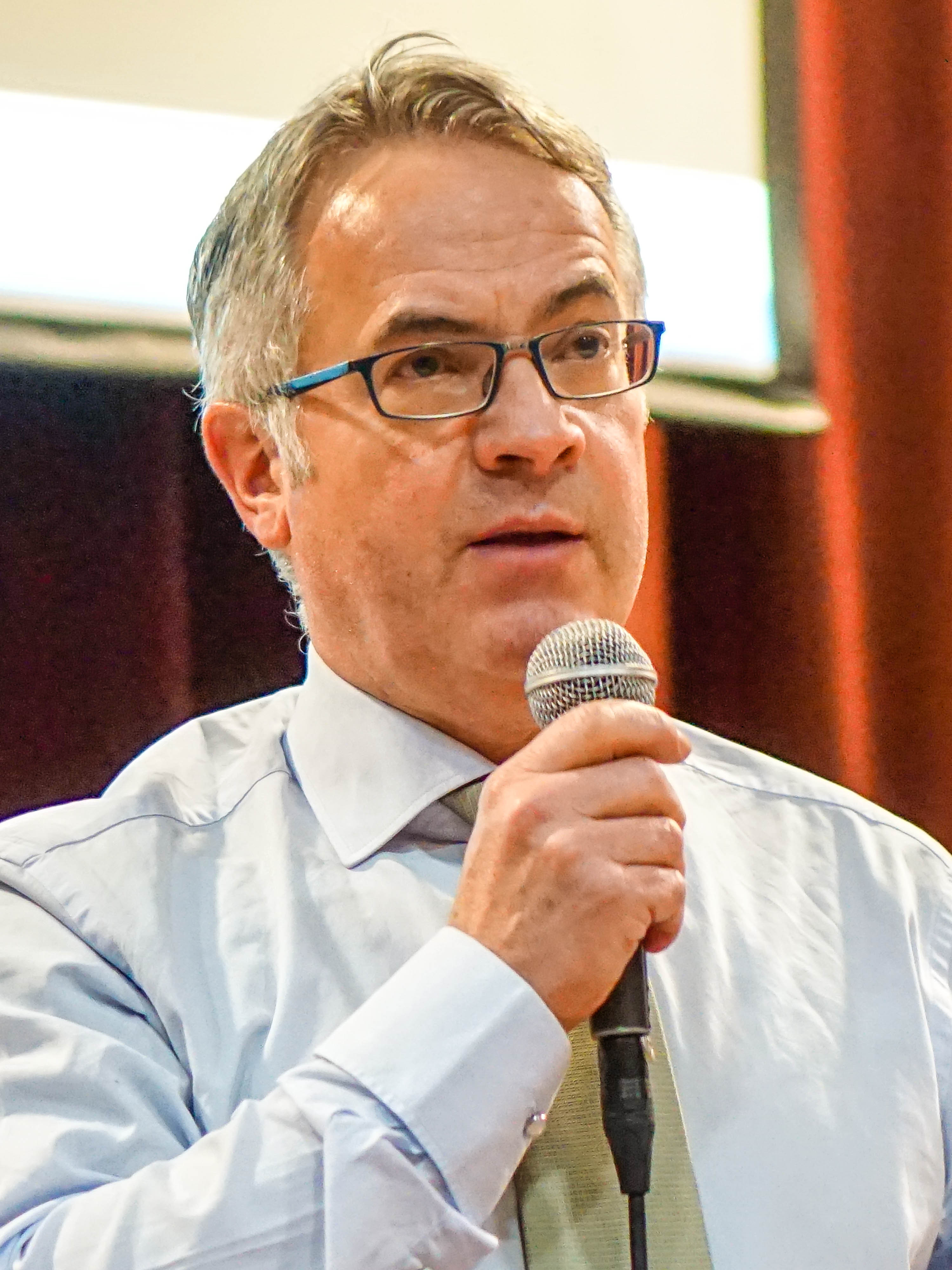

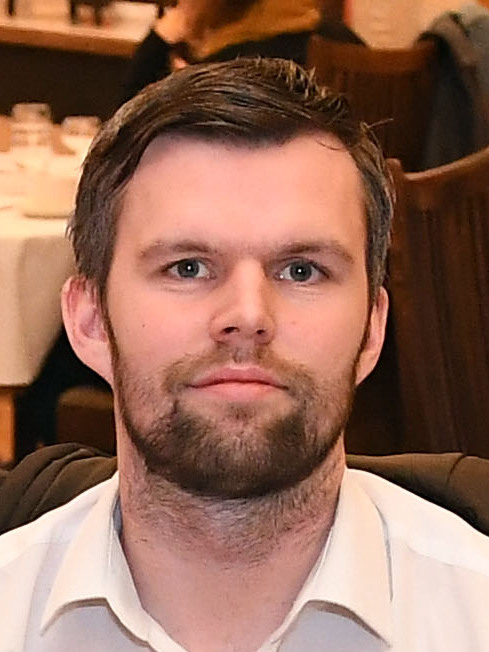

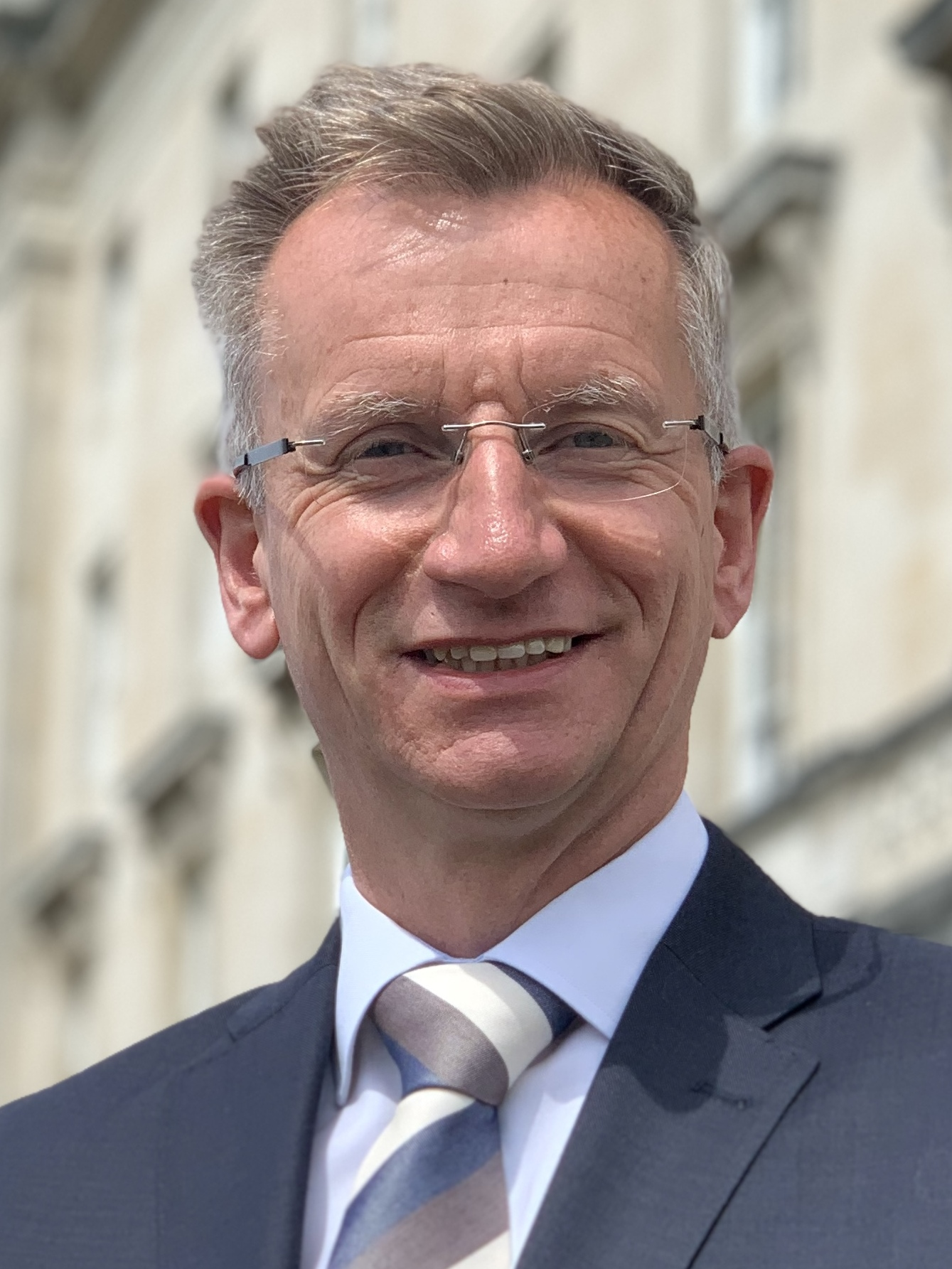
| | First party | Second party |
|---|---|---|
| Candidate | Paul Maskey | Alex Attwood |
| Party | Sinn Féin | SDLP |
| Popular vote | 16,211 | 3,088 |
| Percentage | 70.6% | 13.5% |
| Swing | ▼0.5 pp | ▼2.9 pp |
| | Third party | Fourth party |
| Candidate | Gerry Carroll | Brian Kingston |
| Party | People Before Profit | DUP |
| Popular vote | 1,751 | 1,393 |
| Percentage | 7.6% | 6.1% |
| Swing | New party | ▼1.5 pp |
MP before election
Gerry Adams
Sinn Féin
Subsequent MP
Paul Maskey
Sinn Féin

A by-election for the United Kingdom parliamentary constituency of Belfast West was held on 9 June 2011, prompted by the resignation of the incumbent Sinn Féin Member of Parliament (MP) Gerry Adams to contest the Louth constituency in the 2011 Irish general election. It was won by Paul Maskey, who held the seat for Sinn Féin.

== Background ==
Gerry Adams had held Belfast West for Sinn Féin from 1983 to 1992, and continuously since 1997. At the 1992 UK general election and in the 1974 and 1979 elections, the seat was won instead by the Social Democratic and Labour Party (SDLP), an Irish nationalist party, but by the 2010 general election, they were a long way behind Adams, the seat being the safest in Northern Ireland and the fourth safest anywhere in the UK. A constituency of the same name, with boundaries identical to the Westminster constituency which existed before the 2010 election, was contested at the 2007 Northern Ireland Assembly election, using the single transferable vote method of election. Sinn Féin candidates won five of the six seats and the SDLP the other.

In 2010, the two main unionist parties, the Democratic Unionist Party (DUP) and the Ulster Unionist Party (UUP), both stood candidates in the seat, but took only 10.7% of the vote between them. The DUP did hold one of the six Assembly seats until 2007. Although the UUP have not held their deposit in recent years, they held the Parliamentary seat until 1966.

Members of the House of Commons, whether or not they have taken their seats, cannot resign in form, but a legal fiction has grown up to allow Members to resign in effect. Under Section 4 of the House of Commons Disqualification Act 1975, if an MP wishes to vacate their seat, they can request appointment to either of two 'offices of profit under the Crown' which disqualify them from membership.

As an Irish republican, Adams considered a British Crown appointment politically unacceptable, and therefore submitted a letter resigning his seat to the Speaker of the House of Commons on 20 January 2011; he maintained that by doing so he had simply resigned.

Notwithstanding that he had not requested it, Adams was appointed as Crown Steward and Bailiff of the Manor of Northstead and officially ceased to be an MP on 26 January 2011; a Treasury spokesperson said that this appointment had been made "consistent with long-standing precedent". Although David Cameron said during Prime Minister's Questions that Adams had "accepted an office for profit under the Crown", Adams denied this and received an apology from the Prime Minister's Office for not informing him of the procedure and for stating that he had applied for the position.

In order for a by-election to take place, an MP makes a motion in the House of Commons to the Speaker to issue a warrant to the Clerk of the Crown in Chancery, who then issues the writ ordering that the election take place. Traditionally, the MP comes from the same party as the member that has stood down. However, because Sinn Féin MPs do not take their seats in the Commons, the writ was moved by the Government Chief Whip, Conservative MP Patrick McLoughlin on 16 May 2011.

== Candidates ==
Alex Attwood, the Environment Minister in the Northern Ireland Executive, and the Social Democratic and Labour Party's candidate for the seat at the 2010 general election was the SDLP candidate for the by-election.

Brian Kingston was the Democratic Unionist Party candidate.

Paul Maskey, a member of the Northern Ireland Assembly, won the Sinn Féin nomination. Danny Morrison, the former publicity director of Sinn Féin, had suggested that the party should stand aside and instead back a candidacy for former Respect Party MP George Galloway.

== Results ==
=== By-election ===
2011 Belfast West by-election
| Party | Candidate | Votes | % | ±% |
|---|---|---|---|---|
| Sinn Féin | Paul Maskey | 16,211 | 70.6 | −0.5 |
| SDLP | Alex Attwood | 3,088 | 13.5 | −2.9 |
| People Before Profit | Gerry Carroll | 1,751 | 7.6 | New |
| DUP | Brian Kingston | 1,393 | 6.1 | −1.5 |
| UUP | Bill Manwaring | 386 | 1.7 | −1.4 |
| Alliance | Aaron McIntyre | 122 | 0.5 | −1.4 |
| Majority | | 13,123 | 57.1 | +2.4 |
| Turnout | | 22,951 | 37.5 | −16.5 |
| Registered electors | | 61,441 | | |
| Sinn Féin hold | | Swing | +1.2 | |

=== Previous General Election ===
General election 2010: Belfast West
| Party | Candidate | Votes | % | ±% |
|---|---|---|---|---|
| Sinn Féin | Gerry Adams | 22,840 | 71.1 | +2.5 |
| SDLP | Alex Attwood | 5,261 | 16.4 | +0.3 |
| DUP | William Humphrey | 2,436 | 7.6 | −3.3 |
| UCU-NF | Bill Manwaring | 1,000 | 3.1 | +0.6 |
| Alliance | Máire Hendron | 596 | 1.9 | +1.8 |
| Majority | | 17,579 | 54.7 | −1.2 |
| Turnout | | 32,133 | 54.0 | −13.5 |
| Registered electors | | 59,522 | | |
| Sinn Féin hold | | Swing | +1.1 | |

== See also ==
- 1903 Belfast West by-election
- 1943 Belfast West by-election
- 1950 Belfast West by-election
- List of United Kingdom by-elections
- Opinion polling for the 2015 United Kingdom general election
