= Ulster Protestant League =

Ulster Protestant League may refer to:

- Ulster Protestant League (1931), a loyalist organisation in Northern Ireland
- Ulster Protestant League (1980), associated with George Seawright
- A registered party led by Tommy Kirkham, formerly of the Ulster Political Research Group
