= Frank McCoubrey =

Northern Irish politician

Councillor Frank McCoubrey

78th Lord Mayor of Belfast
- In office 1 June 2020 – 1 June 2021
- Deputy: Paul McCusker
- Preceded by: Daniel Baker
- Succeeded by: Kate Nicholl

21st Deputy Lord Mayor of Belfast
- In office 1 June 2000 – 1 June 2001
- Preceded by: Marie Moore
- Succeeded by: Hugh Smyth

High Sheriff of Belfast
- In office January 2009 – January 2010
- Preceded by: Margaret McKenzie
- Succeeded by: Christopher Stalford

Member of Belfast City Council
- Incumbent
- Assumed office 21 May 1997
- Preceded by: Joe Coggle
- Constituency: Court

Personal details
- Born: Frank McCoubrey; 5 February 1967 (age 59) Highfield, Belfast, Northern Ireland
- Party: Democratic Unionist Party (2012 - present)
- Other political affiliations: Independent (2001-2012); Ulster Democratic Party (until 2001)
- Known for: Ulster loyalist politician

Frank McCoubrey (born 5 February 1967) is a Northern Irish unionist politician and Ulster Loyalist, as well as a community activist and researcher. McCoubrey is a Belfast City Councillor for the Court DEA since 1997, sitting as a Democratic Unionist Party (DUP) member since 2012. He was a leading member of the Ulster Political Research Group (UPRG). McCoubrey is a native of Highfield, Belfast.

== Emergence in UPRG ==
In 1996 he was an unsuccessful candidate in the Northern Ireland Forum election in West Belfast. McCoubrey was first elected to Belfast City Council in 1997 as a member of the Ulster Democratic Party and was elected as deputy mayor in 2000, with the votes of the Democratic Unionist Party and Ulster Unionist Party councillors. Following the collapse of the UDP and the resulting decision of the Ulster Defence Association (UDA) to reconvene the UPRG McCoubrey was chosen along with Sammy Duddy, Frankie Gallagher and Tommy Kirkham to lead the new group. McCoubrey became one of the leading figures in the UPRG and joined Kirkham and Gallagher in meeting Irish Taoiseach Bertie Ahern in 2004, along with UDA leader Jackie McDonald and prisoners' spokesman Stanley Fletcher in a 'historic' event.

In his role as a councillor McCoubrey opened early channels between loyalism and Sinn Féin, joining UDP colleague John White in holding an unofficial meeting with Alex Maskey in Belfast City Hall in June 2001. McCoubrey also led a campaign in 2003 to bring Gerry Adams to trial for violation of the human rights of the people of the Shankill. McCoubrey, who organised a petition to this effect, argued that Adams' and Sinn Féin's policy of abstentionism meant that the people of the Shankill were being denied representation and sought to bring a case to the European courts to alter the situation. Ultimately, however, nothing came of the initiative.

== Loyalist Day of Culture controversy ==
McCoubrey's term of office as deputy mayor was soon marked by controversy after he wore his official robes and chain of office to a "Loyalist Day of Culture" held on the Lower Shankill on 19 August 2000, where he shared a stage with UDA members Johnny Adair and Michael Stone at the height of a loyalist feud between that group and the Ulster Volunteer Force (UVF). Adair had used the Day to escalate the feud by attacking the UVF associated Rex Bar. Calls were made for McCoubrey to resign, although he claimed that he did not know Adair and Stone would be there and that he was not expecting the gun-fire in the paramilitary show of strength that ended the night. Ultimately the Council decided not to take any action against McCoubrey, with a motion of censure brought in by the Alliance Party of Northern Ireland's David Alderdice defeated in the council. McCoubrey also faced criticism from a former Lord Mayor of Belfast, Hugh Smyth, who had been a friend of his until the incident, with a number of Smyth's colleagues in the Progressive Unionist Party amongst those attacked by Adair and 'C' Company.

== Subsequent activity ==
McCoubrey remains a member of the Council. He officially sat as an independent, as do all elected members of the UPRG. However, in November 2012 it was announced that McCoubrey was giving up his independent status to become a member of the DUP. McCoubrey remains a prominent community activist in the Shankill, working to secure increased funding for the Shankill district, which was named in 2008 as Northern Ireland's most deprived area.

In December 2008, McCoubrey was nominated by Bob Stoker for the post of High Sheriff of Belfast and was sworn into office on 21 January 2009. Subsequently he successfully defended his council seat in the 2011 local elections. He retained his seat for the DUP in 2014.

He later stood in West Belfast at the 2015 general election, coming fourth with 7.8% of the vote.

At the 2016 Assembly election, he was the DUP's candidate for Belfast West, where he came within 90 votes of winning the first seat for a Unionist party in 13 years. At the 2017 Assembly election, he was the last candidate to be eliminated, outpolling the defeated SDLP member, Alex Attwood.

He increased his vote to 13.4% at the 2017 general election, coming a distant second to Sinn Féin's Paul Maskey.

McCoubrey topped the poll at the 2019 Council election, and was elected on the first count.

He was pushed into third place at the 2019 general election, though did see a small increase in his vote by 0.5%.

In 2020, McCoubrey was appointed Lord Mayor of Belfast, replacing Sinn Féin's Daniel Baker. Due to the 2020 coronavirus pandemic the traditional handover was replaced with a smaller meeting in front of 18 of the 60 Belfast councillors inside the chamber at City Hall.

McCoubrey stood again in Belfast West at the 2022 Assembly election. He was beaten by People Before Profit's Gerry Carroll for the final seat, despite initially polling higher than him, with 4,166 first-preference votes (9.54%), to Carroll's 3,279 (7.51%).

He topped the poll again in 2023.

At the 2024 general election, he finished fourth with 4,304 votes (10.8%).

In March 2026, the DUP announced that McCoubrey would be their candidate for Belfast West in the 2027 Assembly Election.

McCoubrey is a member of the board of directors of the Shankill Mirror, a newspaper aimed at the loyalist communities of the Greater Shankill and North Belfast.

Civic offices
Preceded by Marie Moore	Deputy Lord Mayor of Belfast; 2000–2001	Succeeded by Hugh Smyth
Preceded by Margaret McKenzie	High Sheriff of Belfast; 2009	Succeeded by Christopher Stalford
Preceded by Daniel Baker	Lord Mayor of Belfast; 2020-2021	Succeeded by Kate Nicholl
