= Court (District Electoral Area) =

Electoral division of Belfast, Northern Ireland

- Belfast City Council DEA constituency
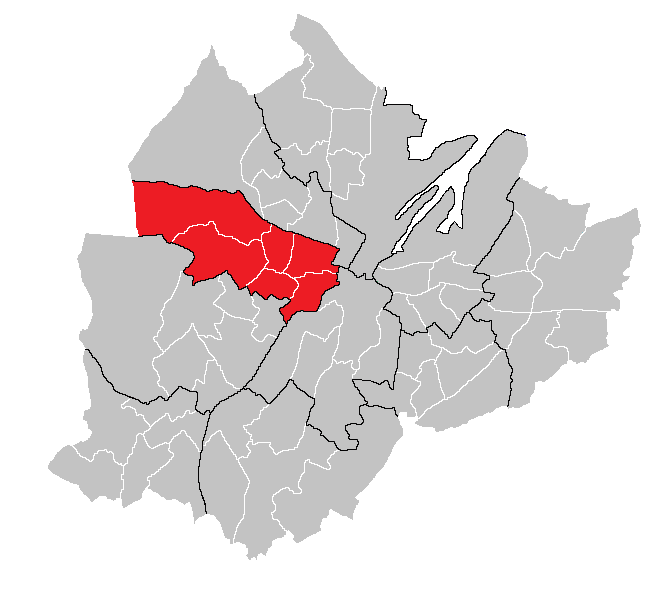
- Court DEA marked on a map of Belfast City Council and its wards

Current constituency
- Created: 1985
- Seats: 6 (1985–1993); 5 (1993–2014); 6 (2014–)
- Councillors: Christina Black (SF); Claire Canavan (SF); Frank McCoubrey (DUP); Ron McDowell (TUV); Ian McLaughlin (DUP); Nicola Verner (DUP)

Court DEA (1993–2014) within Belfast

Court is one of the ten district electoral areas (DEA) in Belfast, Northern Ireland. Located in the north and west of the city, the district elects six members to Belfast City Council and contains the wards of Ballygomartin, Clonard, Falls, Forth River, Shankill, and Woodvale. Court is split between the Belfast North and Belfast West constituencies for the Northern Ireland Assembly and UK Parliament.

== History ==
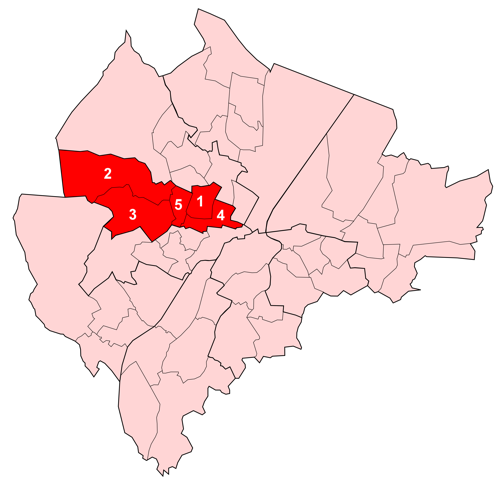
Wards of Court DEA in Belfast from 1993 to 2014 (see census table)

The DEA was created for the 1985 local elections. It initially contained six wards, three of which came from the abolished Area E, with the remainder from Area G. From the 1993 through 2011 local elections, it contained five wards, namely Crumlin, Glencairn, Highfield, Shankill and Woodvale, following the abolition of the Saint Anne's ward. For the 2014 local elections, the Crumlin ward was abolished, the Glencairn ward was replaced by Forth River ward and the Highfield ward was replaced by Ballygomartin ward. These four wards were joined by the Falls and Clonard wards, which had previously been part of the abolished Lower Falls DEA.

== 2011 census data ==
Map	Ward	Population (2011 Census)	Catholic	Protestant	Other	No Religion	Area	Density	NI Assembly	UK Parliament	Ref
1	Crumlin	4,582	11.3%	82.3%	0.6%	5.9%	0.83 km^{2}	5,520/km^{2}	Belfast North	Belfast North	
2	Glencairn	3,749	17.5%	75.5%	0.9%	6.1%	4.1 km^{2}	914/km^{2}	Belfast West	Belfast West	
3	Highfield	5,651	9.5%	82.6%	0.9%	7%	2.69 km^{2}	2,101/km^{2}	Belfast West	Belfast West	
4	Shankill	3,816	7.9%	84.5%	0.7%	6.9%	0.93 km^{2}	4,103/km^{2}	Belfast West	Belfast West	
5	Woodvale	4,088	6%	87%	0.6%	6.4%	0.57 km^{2}	7,172/km^{2}	Belfast North	Belfast North	
Court		21,886	10.3%	82.5%	0.7%	6.5%	9.12 km^{2}	2,400/km^{2}	Belfast North (2) Belfast West (3)	Belfast North (2) Belfast West (3)	

== Councillors ==
Election	Councillor (Party)	Councillor (Party)	Councillor (Party)	Councillor (Party)	Councillor (Party)	Councillor (Party)
2023	Frank McCoubrey (DUP)/ (Independent)/ (UDP)	Ian McLaughlin (DUP)	Nicola Verner (DUP)	Ron McDowell (TUV)	Tina Black (Sinn Féin)	Claire Canavan (Sinn Féin)
June 2022 Co-Option	Frank McCoubrey (DUP)/ (Independent)/ (UDP)	Naomi Thompson (DUP)	Nicola Verner (DUP)	Billy Hutchinson (PUP)	Tina Black (Sinn Féin)	Claire Canavan (Sinn Féin)
2019	Frank McCoubrey (DUP)/ (Independent)/ (UDP)	Brian Kingston (DUP)	Nicola Verner (DUP)	Billy Hutchinson (PUP)	Tina Black (Sinn Féin)	Claire Canavan (Sinn Féin)
December 2018 Co-Option	Frank McCoubrey (DUP)/ (Independent)/ (UDP)	Brian Kingston (DUP)	Jolene Bunting (TUV)/ (Independent)	Billy Hutchinson (PUP)	Tina Black (Sinn Féin)	Claire Canavan (Sinn Féin)
January 2018 Co-Option	Frank McCoubrey (DUP)/ (Independent)/ (UDP)	Brian Kingston (DUP)	Jolene Bunting (TUV)/ (Independent)	Billy Hutchinson (PUP)	Mary McConville (Sinn Féin)	Claire Canavan (Sinn Féin)
February 2017 Defection	Frank McCoubrey (DUP)/ (Independent)/ (UDP)	Brian Kingston (DUP)	Jolene Bunting (TUV)/ (Independent)	Billy Hutchinson (PUP)	Mary McConville (Sinn Féin)	Jim McVeigh (Sinn Féin)
2014	Frank McCoubrey (DUP)/ (Independent)/ (UDP)	Brian Kingston (DUP)	Jolene Bunting (TUV)/ (Independent)	Billy Hutchinson (PUP)	Mary McConville (Sinn Féin)	Jim McVeigh (Sinn Féin)
2011	Frank McCoubrey (DUP)/ (Independent)/ (UDP)	Brian Kingston (DUP)	William Humphrey (DUP)	Hugh Smyth (PUP)	Naomi Thompson (DUP)	5 seats 1993-2014
2005	Frank McCoubrey (DUP)/ (Independent)/ (UDP)	Elaine McMillen (DUP)	William Humphrey (DUP)	Hugh Smyth (PUP)	Diane Dodds (DUP)	5 seats 1993-2014
2001	Frank McCoubrey (DUP)/ (Independent)/ (UDP)	Elaine McMillen (DUP)	Chris McGimpsey (UUP)	Hugh Smyth (PUP)	Eric Smyth (DUP)	5 seats 1993-2014
1997	Frank McCoubrey (DUP)/ (Independent)/ (UDP)	Fred Cobain (UUP)	Chris McGimpsey (UUP)	Hugh Smyth (PUP)	Eric Smyth (DUP)	5 seats 1993-2014
1993	Joseph Coggle (Independent Unionist)	Fred Cobain (UUP)	Chris McGimpsey (UUP)	Hugh Smyth (PUP)	Eric Smyth (DUP)	5 seats 1993-2014
1989	Joseph Coggle (Independent Unionist)	Fred Cobain (UUP)	Herbert Ditty (UUP)	Hugh Smyth (PUP)	Eric Smyth (DUP)	Elizabeth Seawright (Protestant Unionist)
1985	Joseph Coggle (Independent Unionist)	Fred Cobain (UUP)	Herbert Ditty (UUP)	Hugh Smyth (PUP)	Frederick Ashby (DUP)	George Seawright (Protestant Unionist)

== 2023 election ==
2019: 3 x DUP, 2 x Sinn Féin, 1 x PUP

2023: 3 x DUP, 2 x Sinn Féin, 1 x TUV

2019–2023 Change: TUV gain from PUP

Court - 6 seats
Party	Candidate	FPv%	Count										
Party	Candidate	FPv%	1	2	3	4	5	6	7	8	9	10	11
DUP	Frank McCoubrey*	22.00%	2,645										
Sinn Féin	Tina Black*	15.15%	1,822										
DUP	Nicola Verner*	14.83%	1,783										
Sinn Féin	Claire Canavan*	13.44%	1,616	1,616.70	1,697.65	1,698.65	1,698.74	1,712.04	1,780.04				
DUP	Ian McLaughlin	8.26%	993	1,656.25	1,656.25	1,661.30	1,702.37	1,703.40	1,705.46	1,705.46	1,705.46	1,720.5	
TUV	Ron McDowell	8.01%	963	1,090.40	1,090.50	1,093.50	1,098.73	1,098.73	1,101.7	1,101.7	1,104.73	1,130.85	1,156.85
PUP	Billy Hutchinson*	5.65%	679	789.25	789.35	790.35	795.63	795.63	801.07	803.07	803.07	853.92	906.27
People Before Profit	Cailín McCaffery	3.39%	408	409.05	411.40	411.40	411.52	436.62	500.92	509.92	631.27	807.62	
Alliance	Ally Haydock	2.74%	329	333.20	333.80	336.80	337.43	337.48	440.33	465.33	477.43		
Irish Republican Socialist	Michael Kelly	3.32%	399	399.00	402.5	402.5	402.53	406.78	422.98	425.98			
SDLP	Olcan McSparron	1.46%	175	176.05	177.55	178.55	178.61	189.66					
Green (NI)	Sara Haller	0.90%	108	110.45	110.8	111.8	111.92	117.97					
Workers' Party	Tony Walls	0.71%	85	85.00	85.85	85.9	85.93						
Independent	Geoffrey Wilson	0.15%	18	19.05	19.10								
Electorate: 23,779 Valid: 12,023 (50.56%) Spoilt: 252 Quota: 1,718 Turnout: 12,275 (51.62%)

== 2019 Election ==
2014: 2 x DUP, 2 x Sinn Féin, 1 x PUP, 1 x TUV

2019: 3 x DUP, 2 x Sinn Féin, 1 x PUP

2014-2019 Change: DUP gain from TUV

Court - 6 seats
Party	Candidate	FPv%	Count										
Party	Candidate	FPv%	1	2	3	4	5	6	7	8	9	10	11
DUP	Frank McCoubrey*	19.70%	2,227										
DUP	Brian Kingston* †	14.60%	1,648										
DUP	Nicola Verner	9.90%	1,119	1,533.18	1,548.13	1,549.41	1,549.41	1,652.41					
PUP	Billy Hutchinson*	8.20%	929	1,016.48	1,018.08	1,023.35	1,024.35	1,077.13	1,077.55	1,090.55	1,096.55	1,264.73	1,622.32
Sinn Féin	Claire Canavan*	12.80%	1,447	1,447	1,447	1,455	1,466	1,467	1,467	1,489	1,565	1,468	1,569
Sinn Féin	Tina Black*	12.30%	1,396	1,396.27	1,396.28	1,405.29	1,458.29	1,458.29	1,458.29	1,473.29	1,549.29	1,552.56	1,560.56
People Before Profit	Cailín McCaffery	6.10%	686	686.27	686.33	724.33	765.6	767.6	781.88	864.88	968.89	985.43	1,010.75
UUP	Dave Anderson	3.40%	385	411.19	411.89	418.9	420.9	481.45	498.67	529.22	534.22	668.93	
Independent	Jolene Bunting*	3.10%	351	380.43	380.84	383.84	383.84	423.3	427.5	438.5	450.5		
SDLP	Tiernan Fitzlarkin	2.60%	298	298.54	298.54	306.54	320.55	320.55	320.55	359.83			
Alliance	Ciara Campbell	2.20%	253	254.35	254.88	296.38	302.38	305.65	305.65				
TUV	Eric Smyth	2.30%	259	287.43	287.97	287.98	287.98						
Workers' Party	Joanne Lowry	1.50%	166	166	166.02	180.29							
Green (NI)	Sinéad Magner	1.30%	147	148.08	148.13								
Electorate: 22,116 Valid: 11,310 (51.14%) Spoilt: 218 Quota: 1,616 Turnout: 11,528 (52.13%)

== 2014 Election ==
This election was carried out under new ward boundaries, as a result of local government reform.

2011: 3 x DUP, 1 x PUP, 1 x Independent

2014: 2 x DUP, 2 x Sinn Féin, 1 x PUP, 1 x TUV

2011-2014 Changes: Sinn Féin (two seats) and TUV gain from DUP (two seats) and due to the addition of one seat, Independent joins DUP

Court - 6 seats
Party	Candidate	FPv%	Count											
Party	Candidate	FPv%	1	2	3	4	5	6	7	8	9	10	11	12
PUP	Billy Hutchinson*	14.55%	1,674											
DUP	Frank McCoubrey*	13.53%	1,557	1,557	1,569	1,569	1,570	1,769						
DUP	Brian Kingston*	9.86%	1,134	1,136	1,154	1,154	1,157	1,207	1,311.58	1,313.63	1,715.63			
Sinn Féin	Mary McConville	12.17%	1,400	1,400	1,419	1,485	1,533	1,535	1,535	1,535.02	1,536.02	1,536.02	1,539.04	1,732.04
Sinn Féin	Jim McVeigh* †	11.79%	1,357	1,357	1,362	1,398	1,410	1,411	1,411	1,411.01	1,412.01	1,412.3	1,413.32	1,547.33
TUV	Jolene Bunting ‡	7.29%	839	842	852	854	856	865	865.63	866.51	888.87	905.88	1,123.89	1,135.16
UUP	Bill Manwaring	5.66%	651	653	674	675	677	685	688.78	689.85	754.69	785.74	1,098.7	1,117.8
SDLP	Colin Keenan*	4.89%	563	566	635	697	809	809	809	809.04	812.67	813.75	818.31	
PUP	Billy Mawhinney	5.28%	607	610	621	621	625	629	631.52	643.17	713.41	734.47		
DUP	Nicola Verner*	4.49%	516	516	519	519	521	609	621.6	622.26				
DUP	Naomi Thompson*	3.17%	365	366	366	368	369							
Workers' Party	John Lowry	2.57%	296	297	319	334								
Republican Network	Tommy Doherty	2.45%	282	282	284									
Alliance	Sheila Gallagher	1.12%	129	130										
NI21	Stuart Hunter	1.02%	117	117										
Independent	Willie Faulkner	0.16%	18											
Electorate: 20,881 Valid: 11,505 (55.10%) Spoilt: 304 Quota: 1,644 Turnout: 11,809 (56.55%)

== 2011 Election ==
2005: 3 x DUP, 1 x PUP, 1 x Independent

2011: 3 x DUP, 1 x PUP, 1 x Independent

2005-2011 Change: No change

Court - 5 seats
Party	Candidate	FPv%	Count				
Party	Candidate	FPv%	1	2	3	4	5
DUP	William Humphrey*	40.05%	2,643				
DUP	Brian Kingston	20.77%	1,371				
DUP	Naomi Thompson	3.59%	237	1,153.8			
Independent	Frank McCoubrey*	11.42%	754	937.6	1,006.48	1,015.36	1,131.36
PUP	Hugh Smyth*	9.70%	640	782.2	846.04	862.36	939.38
UUP	Bobby McConnell	5.98%	395	585.2	698.32	717.88	805.64
Independent	Raymond McCord	3.02%	199	263.8	281.72	285.98	
Sinn Féin	Karol McKee	2.79%	184	184.6	184.6	184.6	
Alliance	Mark Long	1.18%	78	103.8	108.56	109.76	
SDLP	Conor McNeill	1.50%	99	101.4	102.24	102.54	
Electorate: 13,455 Valid: 6,600 (49.05%) Spoilt: 170 Quota: 1,101 Turnout: 6,770 (50.32%)

== 2005 Election ==
2001: 2 x DUP, 1 x UUP, 1 x PUP, 1 x Independent

2005: 3 x DUP, 1 x PUP, 1 x Independent

2001-2005 Change: DUP gain from UUP

Court - 5 seats
Party	Candidate	FPv%	Count				
Party	Candidate	FPv%	1	2	3	4	5
DUP	Diane Dodds	55.73%	4,176				
DUP	William Humphrey	9.06%	679	2,320.52			
DUP	Elaine McMillen*	2.95%	221	730.07	1,577.39		
Independent	Frank McCoubrey*	10.60%	794	1,107.11	1,186.23	1,244.66	1,312.41
PUP	Hugh Smyth*	10.66%	799	1,003.48	1,043.96	1,065.41	1,174.86
UUP	Chris McGimpsey*	7.67%	575	777.35	860.61	903.08	1,022.96
Sinn Féin	Francis Hamilton	3.32%	249	266.04	267.42		
Electorate: 13,582 Valid: 7,493 (55.17%) Spoilt: 233 Quota: 1,249 Turnout: 7,726 (56.88%)

== 2001 Election ==
1997: 2 x UUP, 1 x DUP, 1 x PUP, 1 x UDP

2001: 2 x DUP, 1 x UUP, 1 x PUP, 1 x Independent

1997-2001 Change: DUP gain from UUP, UDP becomes Independent

Court - 5 seats
Party	Candidate	FPv%	Count				
Party	Candidate	FPv%	1	2	3	4	5
DUP	Eric Smyth*	26.71%	2,605				
Independent	Frank McCoubrey*	17.76%	1,732				
UUP	Chris McGimpsey*	15.66%	1,527	1,612.8	1,661.97		
PUP	Hugh Smyth*	13.70%	1,336	1,450.66	1,478.05	1,510.05	1,774.05
DUP	Elaine McMillen	7.38%	720	1,401.33	1,411.89	1,438.85	1,639.85
PUP	William Smith	8.34%	813	861.75	875.75	893.67	991.67
UUP	Fred Cobain*	7.40%	722	764.51	787.9	812.78	
Sinn Féin	Mick Conlon	2.76%	269	269.39			
Third Way	David Kerr	0.29%	28	31.9			
Electorate: 15,674 Valid: 9,752 (62.22%) Spoilt: 333 Quota: 1,626 Turnout: 10,085 (64.34%)

== 1997 Election ==
1993: 2 x UUP, 1 x DUP, 1 x PUP, 1 x Independent Unionist

1997: 2 x UUP, 1 x PUP, 1 x DUP, 1 x UDP

1993-1997 Change: UDP gain from Independent Unionist

Court - 5 seats
Party	Candidate	FPv%	Count							
Party	Candidate	FPv%	1	2	3	4	5	6	7	8
PUP	Hugh Smyth*	32.83%	3,070							
DUP	Eric Smyth*	16.82%	1,573							
Ulster Democratic	Frank McCoubrey	12.83%	1,200	1,545.28	1,552.32	1,553.48	1,581.48			
UUP	Fred Cobain*	11.21%	1,048	1,240.92	1,248.52	1,249.78	1,297.29	1,326.32	1,369.48	1,699.48
UUP	Chris McGimpsey*	8.56%	800	1,039.2	1,053.28	1,054.7	1,088.81	1,121.22	1,184.77	1,362.25
Ind. Unionist	Joseph Coggle*	4.35%	407	755.92	763.04	764.22	838.38	868.22	936.49	1,084.08
UUP	Glenn Bradley	5.49%	513	617	627.6	628.27	662.05	679.85	839.12	
UUP	Denis Robinson	2.53%	237	349.84	350.84	351.62	372.7	405.17		
NI Women's Coalition	Linda Walker	1.60%	150	208.76	308.52	309.02	325.22			
DUP	Margaret Ferris	2.22%	208	291.72	296.76	303.48				
Alliance	John Roberts	1.54%	144	165.32						
Electorate: 17,089 Valid: 9,350 (54.71%) Spoilt: 243 Quota: 1,559 Turnout: 9,593 (56.14%)

== 1993 Election ==
1989: 2 x UUP, 1 x DUP, 1 x PUP, 1 x Protestant Unionist, 1 x Independent Unionist

1993: 2 x UUP, 1 x DUP, 1 x PUP, 1 x Independent Unionist

1989-1993 Change: Protestant Unionist loss due to the reduction of one seat

Court - 5 seats
Party	Candidate	FPv%	Count						
Party	Candidate	FPv%	1	2	3	4	5	6	7
DUP	Eric Smyth*	24.98%	2,385						
UUP	Fred Cobain*	17.53%	1,674						
PUP	Hugh Smyth*	16.85%	1,609						
UUP	Chris McGimpsey	15.42%	1,472	1,672.2					
Ind. Unionist	Joseph Coggle*	8.29%	792	1,010.4	1,101.4	1,133.55	1,158.34	1,164.77	1,569.37
UUP	Herbert Ditty*	5.99%	572	695.9	792.7	824.4	859.25	861.65	1,068.26
PUP	Elizabeth Seawright*	5.84%	558	772.2	819.65	832.3	850.32	855.74	
Alliance	Irene Galway	3.89%	371	387.1					
Workers' Party	Peter Cullen	1.21%	116	119.5					
Electorate: 18,813 Valid: 9,549 (50.76%) Spoilt: 332 Quota: 1,592 Turnout: 9,881 (52.52%)

== 1989 Election ==
1985: 2 x UUP, 1 x DUP, 1 x PUP, 1 x Protestant Unionist, 1 x Independent Unionist

1989: 2 x UUP, 1 x DUP, 1 x PUP, 1 x Protestant Unionist, 1 x Independent Unionist

1985-1989 Change: No change

Court - 5 seats
Party	Candidate	FPv%	Count						
Party	Candidate	FPv%	1	2	3	4	5	6	7
PUP	Hugh Smyth*	24.25%	2,533						
Protestant Unionist	Elizabeth Seawright	13.48%	1,408	1,768.36					
UUP	Fred Cobain*	11.20%	1,170	1,253.16	1,289.54	1,294.54	1,334.82	1,468.84	1,669.84
DUP	Eric Smyth	9.63%	1,006	1,158.04	1,197.48	1,199.48	1,220.08	1,276.5	1,559.5
Ind. Unionist	Joseph Coggle*	9.12%	953	1,134.02	1,212.9	1,217.9	1,253.74	1,349.08	1,439.04
UUP	Herbert Ditty*	8.59%	897	962.52	1,002.98	1,005.32	1,030.92	1,208.88	1,309.8
Independent	William Smith	6.87%	717	809.4	847.82	849.82	932.84	979.16	1,008.36
DUP	Frederick Ashby*	6.17%	644	673.82	688.1	688.1	703.78	762.72	
Ind. Unionist	Alfie Ferguson	4.87%	509	562.34	583.08	583.08	625.5		
Workers' Party	Peter Cullen	3.51%	367	374.98	379.06	467.06			
Sinn Féin	Joe Austin	2.30%	240	240.42	240.76				
Electorate: 21,173 Valid: 10,444 (49.33%) Spoilt: 381 Quota: 1,493 Turnout: 10,825 (51.13%)

== 1985 Election ==
1985: 2 x UUP, 1 x DUP, 1 x PUP, 1 x Protestant Unionist, 1 x Independent Unionist

Court - 5 seats
Party	Candidate	FPv%	Count								
Party	Candidate	FPv%	1	2	3	4	5	6	7	8	9
Protestant Unionist	George Seawright*	24.39%	2,970								
PUP	Hugh Smyth*	14.46%	1,761								
DUP	Frederick Ashby*	11.66%	1,420	1,591.36	1,593.78	1,681.1	1,682.1	1,732.92	2,186.92		
UUP	Herbert Ditty	9.83%	1,197	1,288.98	1,296.98	1,312.28	1,313.28	1,618.2	1,695.52	1,781.52	
UUP	Fred Cobain	6.60%	804	846	847	856.1	858.1	1,028.28	1,101.26	1,216.26	1,457.46
Ind. Unionist	Joseph Coggle*	7.34%	894	1,134.66	1,139.08	1,144.76	1,146.76	1,201.2	1,266.44	1,336.44	1,471.32
Ulster Democratic	Samuel Doyle	4.40%	536	837.56	842.98	859.22	860.22	946.5	1,004.12	1,050.12	1,097.32
Alliance	William Dukelow	5.14%	626	642.38	730.8	732.64	874.64	899.16	907	914	
DUP	William Baxter	4.70%	572	706.4	708.82	800.34	800.34	826.64			
UUP	James Sands	5.13%	624	750	751	773.24	773.24				
Sinn Féin	Harry Fitzsimmons	3.55%	432	432.42	463.42	463.42					
DUP	Robert Morrow	1.49%	182	260.96	261.38						
Workers' Party	Peter Cullen	1.29%	157	161.62							
Electorate: 22,375 Valid: 12,175 (54.41%) Spoilt: 372 Quota: 1,740 Turnout: 12,547 (56.08%)

== See also ==
- Shankill Road
- Belfast City Council
- Electoral wards of Belfast
- Local government in Northern Ireland
- Members of Belfast City Council

=== Elections ===
- 2019 Belfast City Council election
- 2014 Belfast City Council election
- 2011 Belfast City Council election
- 2005 Northern Ireland local elections § Belfast
- 2001 Northern Ireland local elections § Belfast
- 1997 Northern Ireland local elections § Belfast
- 1993 Northern Ireland local elections § Belfast
- 1989 Northern Ireland local elections § Belfast
- 1985 Northern Ireland local elections § Belfast
