= Thomas Teevan (Unionist politician) =

Member of Parliament for Belfast West
- In office 29 November 1950 – 5 October 1951
- Preceded by: J. G. MacManaway
- Succeeded by: Jack Beattie

Personal details
- Born: Thomas Leslie Teevan; July 1927 Limavady, Northern Ireland
- Died: 11 October 1954 (age 27) Portstewart, Northern Ireland
- Party: Ulster Unionist
- Education: Queen's University Belfast

Thomas Leslie Teevan (July 1927 – 11 October 1954) was an Ulster Unionist Party politician and lawyer, notable for his extreme youth when first elected, brief career, and very early death.

== Early life ==
Thomas Teevan was born in Limavady, County Londonderry, Northern Ireland, in 1927. He was educated at Limavady Academy and Queen's University Belfast. At his time at university, he served as President of the Literary and Scientific Society (Queen's University Belfast). He was a lecturer in law.

== Brief political career ==
In 1950, a vacancy arose in the Belfast West constituency, owing to the disqualification of the Reverend J. G. MacManaway for being an Anglican priest despite the Church of Ireland being disestablished. Teevan was selected as Unionist candidate for the ensuing by-election.

He was elected on 29 November 1950 over the Northern Ireland Labour Party candidate, Jack Beattie, a former MP for the seat, by 913 votes. Teevan was aged only 23 and became Baby of the House upon taking the oath on 5 December 1950.

His tenure lasted only 330 days, and he lost the seat to Beattie by just 25 votes in the 1951 general election. Aged only 24, he thus became the youngest person to leave the House of Commons in modern times. MacManaway himself died in November 1951, aged 53.

== Career ==
Teevan qualified as a barrister in Northern Ireland in 1952. He also served as Chairman of Limavady Urban District Council and as vice-president of the North Derry Unionist Association.

== Death ==
Teevan died suddenly in 1954, at his home in Portstewart, County Londonderry, aged just 27.

== See also ==
- List of United Kingdom MPs with the shortest service

== Notes ==
Parliament of the United Kingdom
| Preceded by J. G. MacManaway | Member of Parliament for Belfast West; November 1950 – 1951 | Succeeded by Jack Beattie |
| Preceded by Tony Benn | Baby of the House; 1950–1951 | Succeeded by Tony Benn |
