= Eamonn Boyce =

Irish Republican Army member (1925–2020)

Eamonn Boyce (8 August 1925 – 5 February 2020) was an Irish volunteer of the Irish Republican Army. He was considered among the leading young activists in the organisation in the early 1950s along with Charlie Murphy, Robert Russell, Tom Mitchell, Ruairí Ó Brádaigh and Joe Christle. He and Murphy were responsible for a successful raid on a British military barracks in Armagh in the summer of 1954.

Boyce was later captured leading an IRA arms raid on the military barracks in Omagh, County Tyrone, on 17 October 1954, for which he was sentenced to twelve years' penal servitude in Belfast Gaol. Despite the raid's failure, the resulting publicity surrounding Boyce's trial brought considerable recruits and funding for the organisation. Forty years following his release, Boyce's prison diaries were published as The Insider: The Belfast Prison Diaries of Eamonn Boyce, 1956–1962 detailing daily life inside the infamous prison during the Border Campaign.

== Biography ==
=== Early life and IRA activity ===
Eamonn Boyce was born on North William Street, Dublin, on 8 August 1925, the eldest son of Edward Boyce and Mary Josephine Boyce (née Dunne). He was working as a CIÉ Bus Conductor when he was first recruited by the Irish Republican Army in 1952. His father had joined the Irish Volunteers in 1914 to fight for the Independence of Ireland, but he followed John Redmond’s call for Irishmen to join in the ‘Great War’ with the promise of Home Rule as the reward. Edward Boyce fought for the British Army in France during World War I.

However, he was heavily influenced by his mother's and uncles' backgrounds, fighting with Cumann na mBan and the IRA against the British during the Irish War of Independence & later against the pro-treaty Free State Forces during the Irish Civil War. He had previously been unaware of the organisation's existence, believing it long since disbanded since the end of the Irish Civil War, when he passed by a large billboard advertising an upcoming Sunday exposé on the IRA in an English newspaper.

Boyce's attention was attracted to "a trench-coated figure carrying two guns", in particular, and initially thought the portrayal was related to the Irish War of Independence. When he mentioned this to his companion, Matty O'Neill, a former Curragh internee, remarking on the garishness of the advertisement, Boyce was surprised when the older man replied "Sure, them that's running it now don't mind." Intrigued that the organisation was still active, he investigated further and was officially brought into the organisation at age 27.

=== Raid on Armagh (June 1954) ===
A year later, Boyce, now Intelligence Officer, and Charlie Murphy began developing a plan to raid a British military barracks in Northern Ireland for weapons and other supplies. They enlisted a fellow Dubliner and IRA man to infiltrate the barracks by joining the British Army.

The man was posted to Armagh, and while there, kept in contact with Murphy and Boyce at soldiers' dances. The two men would leave the hall, appearing to court the various girls they brought with them to the dance, but, in actuality, were meeting their informants and doing scouting the area outside the installation, gathering substantial information on troop movements and weapons storage. This information was backed up with detailed maps and photographs taken with a Minix spy camera. The eventually felt confident enough to plan the raid for 12 June 1954.

The operation was launched from a farmhouse in Dundalk about a mile south of the border. The initial plan was to have a lorry transport the majority of the 19-man raiding party. The majority were armed with Thompson submachine guns as well as small arms, grenades and burglary tools. When the lorry failed to arrive, however, they were forced to improvise and called a local haulier on the pretense of moving a herd of cattle. The haulier, once he arrived, was forced into a tent and his vehicle stolen. The raiders left in two groups with the smaller of the two traveling in a car. They were specifically tasked with taking over the guardroom. That afternoon, at around 3:00 pm, the car drove through the barracks' gate.

As the men held up the guardroom, one of the raiders took the place of the sentry. This man, having spent some time in the Irish equivalent on the British Territorial Army, was able to convincingly march up and down the gate.

The lorry carrying the rest of the IRA raiders overshot the gate while following behind the car and forced to reverse. As they did so, a British army lorry also entering the base allowed the truck to pull in first and drove by without noticing anything suspicious. In all, the raid netted 340 rifles, 50 Sten guns, 12 Bren light machine guns (most of which were deactivated), and a number of .22 mm arms.

Although their activity was discovered during the course of the robbery, being necessary to put two soldiers in the guardroom, all the raiders were able to escape. The lorry was driven out first, with Boyce and a few others staying behind to lock every gate and door for which they could find keys, before leaving in the car. The keys were later auctioned in the United States to raise additional funds for the IRA.

The raiders' luck held and both the car and lorry were able to re-enter the Republic of Ireland without incident. At the Monaghan side of the border, a member of the Royal Ulster Constabulary gave the lorry the right of way and were able to drive the last 7 miles safely. The party split up at a dump in County Meath, upon meeting with IRA Chief of Staff Tony Magan, with some making their way back to Dublin by bus. Boyce and Joe Christle, another member of the raid, were to drive the lorry back to Dublin themselves. While Boyce sat in the back of the lorry, Christle climbed into the drivers' cabin and ordered the driver to divert from the pre-arranged route and onto the main roads. They eventually attracted the attention of a Garda police car on the outskirts of Dublin, having heard news of the Armagh raid, and attempted to block the road. Christle told the driver to ram the car but it was able to pull out of the way. The two men in the lorry were later taken into custody when returning it to its owner.

They were questioned by police but were released partly due to lack of evidence, nothing save two revolvers were found in the truck, and the Irish government's embarrassment over the incident.

=== Omagh raid (October 1954) ===
On the night of 16 October 1954, Boyce led 35 men in a second weapons raid in Omagh, County Tyrone, the supply depot for the Royal Inniskilling Fusiliers. The previous week, Magan delivered 20 machine guns to a house in Dublin in preparation for the attack; a "carbon copy of the Armagh raid", it was also to have been co-led by Murphy but ordered to remain Dublin at the last minute. Gearóid Ó Broin, a leading republican during the period, was in charge of the transportation for the raid consisting of two small cars and a lorry. Equipment was also brought to jump start British army lorries which the raiders hoped to later commandeer at the base.

The barracks was being guarded by three patrolling sentries with two watching the wall facing the town while a third soldier guarded back wall covering approximately 100 yards. The raid was supposed to have taken place at the changing of the guard but O'Broin had trouble securing a lorry and was forced to steal one. This caused a three-hour delay and, at 3:30 am, Boyce and 15 other men scaled the wall while the rest waited outside. Three of the men were armed with knives, assigned to neutralise the sentry on duty, and broke away from Boyce's group once inside the base. They headed towards an archway where the soldier was to supposed take shelter, and when he did not, the three attacked him. Instead of using their knives, they instead attempted to merely knock him out using the butts of their revolvers.

The soldier was able to fight off the three men and his shouts alerted the British soldiers in the guardroom near the main entrance. It was through the main gate that the raiders had planned to use to flee if things went wrong. With their escape route blocked, the soldiers now shooting from the guardroom, Boyce and his men retreated back the way they came over the wall and escaped into the surrounding marshes. The 20 other raiders outside the main entrance were left standing outside the main gate.

"I have no doubt at all that you sincerely consider yourselves dutiful Christians. It would be easy to say that you are of the criminal class, or that your expressions of devoutness are hypocrisy, but I do not find it easy to say that, and therin lies the real tragedy.

I only wish that those who taught you these views, as well as those who sent you to Omagh, were present today to share your punishment."

— Lord MacDermott, Lord Chief Justice of Northern Ireland.

The raiders split up at this point, and in the confusion, Boyce was left behind with the lorry driving without him. He was not yet concerned about being pursued and was walking to the lorry, keeping a lookout for stragglers, when it suddenly took off when he was 50 yards away. He ran after the lorry but was unable to catch up. He then unsuccessfully tried to break into an RUC car parked nearby before resigning to walk the 20 miles back to the border. Boyce got as far as the Clogher Valley area, and while taking off his boilersuit in a ditch, he was captured by a Protestant farmer and his five sons, all of whom were heavily armed. He reportedly experienced some degree of police brutality following his capture, being "cuffed about" and forced to dress and undress in his wet clothes six times, before being transported back to Omagh to stand trial. At his trial, which he and his men refused to recognise, Boyce told the court "This war was not waged against any Irishman, but against a foreign Queen who has no right to have her forces on our soil."

The 27-year-old Boyce, who was identified by authorities as the leader in the raid, was sentenced to twelve years' penal servitude in Belfast Gaol after conviction for Treason Felony. The rest of the men involved received ten years each.

=== Release and later years ===
Boyce was released from prison after serving eight years of his twelve-year sentence. He was in poor health at the time, having trouble with his nerves, preventing him from "any of the normal things prison keeps a man from doing" such as crossing a street unaided, walking into a shop or applying to a labour exchange. This, he put down to the severe restrictions imposed on Category A Republican Prisoners & the 'Institutionalisation' of many years imprisonment. Boyce was a Sinn Féin candidate in absentia at the 1955 general election in Belfast West, where he placed last out of three candidates. The Ulster Unionist Patricia McLaughlin won the seat, defeating the then-incumbent Jack Beattie of Irish Labour.

He learned that his mother had also suffered during his incarceration, not only because of the emotional stress, but through the loss of Boyce's income and reportedly unknowingly aiding his accomplices; for months, several hundredweights of gelignite had been hidden under her bed. He was eventually able to get his job back as a bus conductor and later married Dympna McConnell, a grand-niece of Michael Mallin, Chief of Staff of the Irish Citizen Army, executed on 8 May 1916 for his part in the Easter Rising. According to author Tim Pat Coogan, Boyce was a typical "example of what IRA men were like at the time and of what they encountered". Like of his contemporaries of the 1950s, he dropped out of the movement entirely.

His prison dairies were published by Anna Bryson as The Insider: The Belfast Prison Diaries of Eamonn Boyce, 1956–1962, in 2007.

Boyce died on 5 February 2020, aged 94.
