= Belfast West =

Belfast West can refer to:

- The western part of Belfast
- Belfast West (Assembly constituency), created 1973
- Belfast West (Northern Ireland Parliament constituency), 1921–1929
- Belfast West (UK Parliament constituency), created 1922
