= Frankie Gallagher =

Northern Irish loyalist community worker

Frankie Gallagher was a loyalist community worker from Northern Ireland and was along with Tommy Kirkham and Sammy Duddy one of the first leading spokespeople for the Ulster Political Research Group (UPRG) which offered political advice to the Ulster Defence Association (UDA) during the Troubles.

== Work with UPRG ==
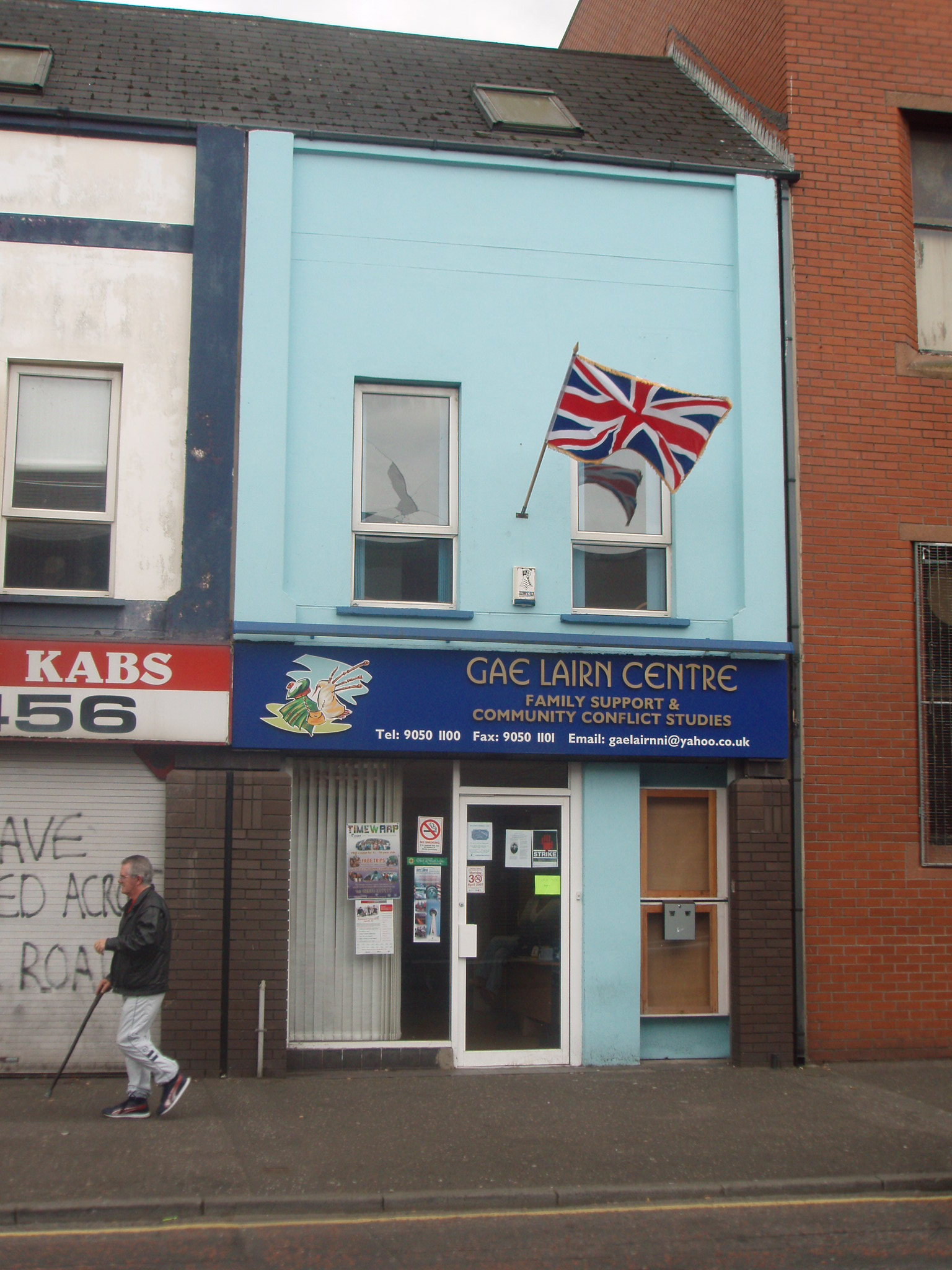
Gae Lairn Centre

Gallagher had little involvement in politics prior to the dissolution of the Ulster Democratic Party, but rather was a community worker in East Belfast who was known to count convicted murderer of six people Michael Stone amongst his friends. During this time he also worked for Gae Lairn, an Ulster Scots based community project for former prisoners. Nevertheless, despite his comparatively low profile, when the UDA decided to recall the UPRG Gallagher was chosen along with the likes of Tommy Kirkham and Sammy Duddy to provide a new team of spokesmen for their political arm.

Gallagher became one of the leading spokesmen for the organisation and announced the UDA ceasefire in 2003. Subsequently he joined Kirkham, Frank McCoubrey, Jackie McDonald and Stanley Fletcher in a historic meeting with Irish Taoiseach Bertie Ahern in 2004.

== Anti-drugs campaign ==
Gallagher was a staunch critic of UDA renegade brigadier Jim Gray and accused him of using his links with the Police Service of Northern Ireland (Gray having been alleged to have been a long-term police informant) to criminalize loyalist communities by building a drugs empire that the police would not touch. Following Gray's murder Gallagher argued that he had created hundreds of victims amongst East Belfast's loyalist community and claimed that there would be no mourners from Gray's home estate of Tullycarnet. He has since become a leading voice of opposition against drug dealing in loyalist estates.

== Funding issues ==
He has claimed that loyalist communities have enjoyed little dividend from the peace process and has claimed that the issue of weapons decommissioning has been used unfairly by the governments to withhold funding from community projects. Despite this he has remained a supporter of the Belfast Agreement to the extent that he urged UPRG supporters to vote Democratic Unionist Party or Ulster Unionist Party in the 2007 Northern Ireland Assembly election, rather than supporting the dissident independent unionists.

Whilst Gallagher welcomed funding for UDA-backed projects in 2007 he argued that the government had to accept that it was essential for the government to accept that the UDA was central to loyalist communities and that they could not be taken out of the equation in determining how money was spent.

== See also ==
- Ulster Defence Association
- Ulster Political Research Group
