= Northern Council for Unity =

Irish political party

- Founder: Anthony Mulvey
- Founded: 1937
- Dissolved: c. 1945

The Northern Council for Unity was an Irish republican political party founded in 1937 by Anthony Mulvey.

The group was formed in 1937 following the promulgation of the Constitution of Ireland with the intention of opposing any measures that it felt helped to recognise the legitimacy of the Parliament of Northern Ireland. Its secretary was Peader Murney. A breakaway from the Nationalist Party, the group took up a policy of abstentionism towards the 1938 Northern Ireland general election but soon joined the Nationalists in the Éamon de Valera-led initiative the Anti-Partition League. The organisation also attracted some former members of Sinn Féin, such as Hugh Corvin.

The 'Mulveyites', as they were sometimes called, had merged back into the Nationalists by around 1945.
