= Brian Kingston =

Unionist politician from Northern Ireland (born 1966)

Brian Kingston MLA
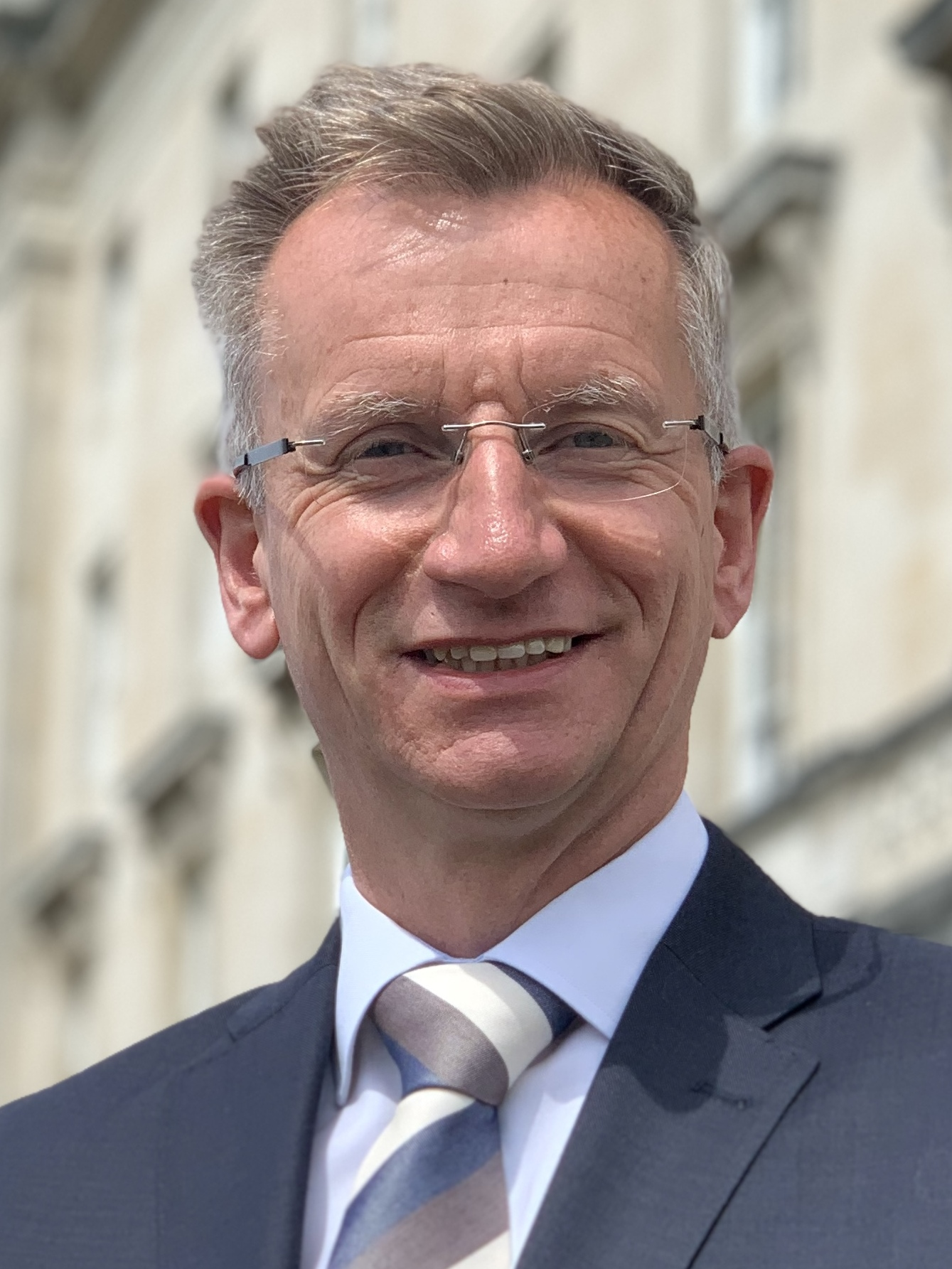
- Kingston outside Parliament Buildings, Stormont, May 2022

Member of the Northern Ireland Assembly for Belfast North
- Incumbent
- Assumed office 5 May 2022
- Preceded by: William Humphrey

70th Lord Mayor of Belfast
- In office 1 June 2016 – 1 June 2017
- Deputy: Mary Ellen Campbell
- Preceded by: Arder Carson
- Succeeded by: Nuala McAllister

High Sheriff of Belfast
- In office 21 January 2013 – 17 January 2014
- Preceded by: May Campbell
- Succeeded by: Lydia Patterson

Member of Belfast City Council
- In office 1 May 2010 – 7 May 2022
- Preceded by: Diane Dodds
- Succeeded by: Naomi Thompson
- Constituency: Court

Personal details
- Born: 22 February 1966 (age 60) Belfast, Northern Ireland
- Party: Democratic Unionist Party
- Spouse: Eileen
- Children: Leanne; Owen; Amy
- Education: Methodist College Belfast
- Alma mater: University of Manchester; Queens University Belfast
- Occupation: Politician

Brian Kingston (born 22 February 1966) is a Democratic Unionist Party (DUP) politician, serving as a Member of the Northern Ireland Assembly (MLA) for Belfast North since 2022. Kingston is the DUP Spokesperson for Local Government.

He was previously High Sheriff of Belfast from 2013 to 2014, and then Lord Mayor of Belfast from 2016 to 2017. Kingston was a Belfast City Councillor for the Court DEA from 2010 to 2022.

== Career ==
Kingston was co-opted onto Belfast City Council for the Court District in 2010, and was subsequently elected in 2011, 2014 and 2019.

He was also the DUP candidate in Belfast West at the 2011 Northern Ireland Assembly election, but was not elected.

Kingston later stood in the 2011 Belfast West by-election to the House of Commons, coming fourth.

He was appointed High Sheriff of Belfast in 2013, and was later elected Lord Mayor of Belfast in 2016.

At the 2022 Assembly election, he was elected to the Northern Ireland Assembly as one of two DUP representatives in Belfast North
