= Patricia McLaughlin =

Patricia McLaughlin OBE
- Formal portrait, 1959

Member of Parliament for Belfast West
- In office 26 May 1955 – 25 September 1964
- Preceded by: Jack Beattie
- Succeeded by: James Kilfedder

Personal details
- Born: Florence Patricia Alice Aldwell; 23 June 1916 Downpatrick, County Down, Ireland
- Died: 7 January 1997 (aged 80) Headbourne Worthy, Hampshire, England
- Party: Ulster Unionist
- Spouse: Henry McLaughlin
- Children: 3
- Education: Trinity College Dublin

Florence Patricia Alice McLaughlin OBE (née Aldwell; 23 June 1916 – 7 January 1997) was a unionist politician in Northern Ireland and one of the earliest female Members of Parliament (MPs) from the region.

== Early life ==
Florence Patricia Alice Aldwell was born in Downpatrick on 23 June 1916. Her father was ordained in the Church of Ireland. She was educated at Ashleigh House and Trinity College, Dublin before going on to join the Ulster Unionist Party. In 1937, she married Henry McLaughlin.

== Career ==
Chosen to represent the party in the West Belfast constituency for the 1955 general election, she captured the seat from incumbent Jack Beattie and went on to successfully defend it at the 1959 election before retiring from politics. She made a surprise comeback in the 1970 general election as the Conservative Party candidate in Wandsworth Central, although she failed to win the seat. She was also a founding member of the Westminster women's Orange Lodge.

On 13 January 1958 she visited Crumlin Road Prison in Belfast where Irish Republican Army (IRA) inmate Eamonn Boyce noted in Irish in his diary entry from that date that she was inside 'looking at the animals!'.

== Personal life and death ==
McLaughlin and her husband had three children. Her husband and one of their daughters predeceased her. She was a devout Anglican.

McLaughlin died from bronchopneumonia and chronic obstructive pulmonary disease at a care home in Headbourne Worthy, Hampshire, on 7 January 1997, at the age of 80.

== Awards ==
McLaughlin was awarded the OBE in 1975.

Parliament of the United Kingdom
Preceded by Jack Beattie	Member of Parliament for Belfast West; 1955–1964	Succeeded by James Kilfedder
