= Alexander Browne =

British politician (1863–1942)

Member of Parliament for Belfast West
- In office 27 October 1931 – 11 December 1942
- Preceded by: W.E.D. Allen
- Succeeded by: Jack Beattie

Personal details
- Died: 11 December 1942
- Party: Ulster Unionist Party

Captain Alexander Crawford Browne (died 11 December 1942) was an Ulster Unionist Party politician.

Crawford Browne attended Methodist College Belfast from 1873 to 1880. He served in the 36th (Ulster) Division from 1914 to 1919 and became a Captain in 1917. In 1924 he was elected as a Belfast City Councillor before becoming a councillor for Princeton Ward in Bangor in 1927. He was elected at the 1931 general election as Member of Parliament (MP) for Belfast West, and held the seat until his death.

In 1935, he married Dorothy Dawson. Dorothy was from a family of eight who also attended Methodist College Belfast.

His death triggered a by-election in February 1943, when the formerly safe Unionist seat was won by the Northern Ireland Labour Party candidate Jack Beattie.

Parliament of the United Kingdom
Preceded by William Edward David Allen	Member of Parliament for Belfast West; 1931–1942	Succeeded by Jack Beattie
