= 1943 Belfast West by-election =

UK by-election

The 1943 Belfast West by-election was a by-election held on 9 February 1943 for the British House of Commons constituency of Belfast West, in Northern Ireland. The seat had become vacant when the sitting Ulster Unionist Member of Parliament (MP) Alexander Browne had died in December 1942.

The winner was Northern Ireland Labour Party candidate Jack Beattie, a shock result in what had previously been a Unionist safe seat.

== Result ==
Belfast West by-election, 9 February 1943
Party	Candidate	Votes	%	±%
NI Labour	Jack Beattie	19,936	46.2	N/A
UUP	Knox Cunningham	14,426	33.4	–29.2
Ind. Unionist Party	William McConnell Wilton	7,551	17.5	N/A
Ind. Republican	Hugh Corvin	1,250	2.9	–34.5
Majority		5,510	12.8	N/A
Turnout		43,163	54.8	–13.2
Registered electors		78,763		
NI Labour gain from UUP		Swing		

== Previous result ==
General election 1935: Belfast West
Party	Candidate	Votes	%	±%
UUP	Alexander Browne	34,060	62.6	+4.0
Ind. Republican	Charles Leddy	20,313	37.4	N/A
Majority		13,747	25.2	+8.0
Turnout		54,373	68.0	−0.1
Registered electors		79,902		
UUP hold		Swing		

== See also ==
- 1950 Belfast West by-election
- Belfast West (UK Parliament constituency)
