= Belfast West (UK Parliament constituency) =

Parliamentary constituency in the United Kingdom, 1885–1918 and since 1922

- Borough constituency for the House of Commons
- Boundary of Belfast West in Northern Ireland
- District: Belfast; Lisburn and Castlereagh
- Electorate: 60,817 (March 2011)
- Borough: Belfast
- Major settlements: Belfast

Current constituency
- Created: 1922
- Member of Parliament: Paul Maskey (Sinn Féin)
- Seats: 1
- Created from: Belfast Falls; Belfast St Anne's; Belfast Woodvale

1885–1918
- Seats: 1
- Type of constituency: Borough constituency
- Created from: Belfast
- Replaced by: Belfast Falls; Belfast St Anne's; Belfast Woodvale

Belfast West is a parliamentary constituency in the House of Commons of the UK Parliament. Since the 2011 Belfast West by-election, it has been represented by Paul Maskey of Sinn Féin.

Map of boundaries 2010-2024

== History ==
Belfast West has historically been the most nationalist of Belfast's four constituencies. The constituency is largely made of a long belt along the Falls Road and its suburban extensions, with three of the five wards from the unionist Shankill area now "something of a bolt-on", with a several kilometre (miles) long peace line dividing them from the rest of the constituency. There is also a smaller Protestant enclave at Suffolk.

The tenor of the constituency is largely working class and in the 1991 census it was one of only twenty constituencies where the majority of housing was still state-owned. Although there are now large pockets of middle-class housing in Andersonstown and other suburban parts of the seat. Closer to the centre public-sector terraced housing, both Victorian and high quality modern housing, predominates, while in the suburbs, leafy pockets are scattered among post-War housing estates such as Lenadoon and Twinbrook.

For twenty years, the Westminster constituency was consistently held by the Ulster Unionist Party but always had strong Labour movement sympathies. In the 1923 general election, the Belfast Labour Party came within 1,000 votes of taking the seat. A by-election in 1943 was won by Jack Beattie, standing for the Northern Ireland Labour Party. For the next twenty-three years the seat would regularly change from unionist to nationalist/labour, with the latter represented by a variety of parties.

In the 1966 general election the seat was won by Gerry Fitt of the Republican Labour Party. Later in 1970 he left that party to become a founder and first leader of the Social Democratic and Labour Party. In the February 1974 general election, Belfast West was the only constituency in Northern Ireland to elect an MP supporting the Sunningdale Agreement. Fitt's majority was a narrow 2,180 votes in February 1974 primarily due to the candidature of Albert Price, father of the Price sisters who were in prison in England for Provisional IRA–related offences. However the candidacy of a UVF-backed candidate in October 1974 and a declining Unionist vote in 1979 led to him increasing his majorities in subsequent years. He retained the seat for the next nine years but increasingly distanced himself from nationalist groups and in late 1979 he left the SDLP. He sat as an independent socialist but lost his seat in the 1983 general election when it was won by Gerry Adams of Sinn Féin. The Unionist vote which had still been at 30% in the 1982 Assembly elections was cut to 20% as a result of the 1983 boundary changes which, while adding the loyalist Glencairn area, removed the Donegall Road, Sandy Row and added the Nationalist Lenadoon area.

Adams's share of the vote, at 37%, was short of a majority and he achieved victory only due to Fitt and the SDLP candidate splitting the non–Sinn Féin vote. At the 1987 general election Adams held his seat, but lost it in the 1992 general election amidst a strong tactical voting campaign in favour of Joe Hendron of the Social Democratic and Labour Party by unionists in the Shankill Road area of the constituency. After the election a constituent, Maura McCrory, lodged an election petition challenging the result. The election court reported Hendron personally guilty of the illegal practice of failing to deliver a declaration verifying the return of his election expenses, and guilty through his election agent of failing to deliver a verified return of election expenses within 35 days, exceeding the maximum spending by £782.02, and failing to pay all the expenses within 28 days. Hendron's agent was also reported personally guilty of distributing election material without the name and address of the printer and publisher. The Judges granted both Hendron and his agent relief from their findings, on the grounds that the law had been broken through inadvertence; they therefore certified that Hendron had been duly elected.

In the mid-1990s the Boundary Commission originally suggested removing the Shankill wards from the constituency and replacing them with about half of the Belfast South constituency, namely the six wards of the Balmoral Electoral Area and the Shaftesbury ward. The subsequent local enquiries were bitterly contested with the SDLP favouring the commission's original proposals which would add an area where Sinn Féin had little support (and aside from the Shaftesbury ward, had not contested in council elections), while Sinn Féin argued instead for adding the mostly republican Twinbrook and Poleglass estates (where they were outpolling the SDLP in council elections by a margin of 3 to 1). With all parties except the SDLP supporting an option of retaining four seats in Belfast the latter option became the commissions final proposals and the Shankill wards remained in the constituency.

The boundary changes, coupled with the Irish Republican Army (IRA) ceasefire, meant that support for Sinn Féin in the constituency soared to new levels and in all elections held in the seat since 1996 they have taken over 50% of the vote. In 1997 Adams regained the seat and held it in 2001, 2005 and 2010. In 2011, Adams decided to stand in the 2011 Irish general election and vacated his seat.

In the 2016 referendum to leave the European Union, the constituency voted remain by 74.1%.

== Boundaries ==
Under the Redistribution of Seats Act 1885, the parliamentary borough of Belfast was expanded. The 2-seat borough constituency of Belfast was divided into four divisions: East, South, West, and North.

The city boundaries were expanded under the Belfast Corporation Act 1896. Under the Redistribution of Seats (Ireland) Act 1918, the parliamentary borough was extended to include the whole city and the number of divisions increased from 4 to 9. The Falls, St Anne's and Woodvale divisions largely replaced the West division. These boundaries were in effect at the 1918 general election.

The Government of Ireland Act 1920 established the Parliament of Northern Ireland, which came into operation in 1921. The representation of Northern Ireland in the Parliament of the United Kingdom was reduced from 30 MPs to 13 MPs, taking effect at the 1922 United Kingdom general election. These changes saw a 4-seat Belfast West constituency in the House of Commons of Northern Ireland and Belfast West re-established as a one-seat constituency at Westminster.

1885–1918	So much of St. Anne's Ward as is bounded on the north-west by a line drawn along the centre of Carrick Hill; so much of St. George's Ward as lies to the north of a line drawn along the centre of Grosvenor Street and west of a line drawn along the centre of Durham Street; Smithfield Ward; and in the parish of Shankill, in the County of Antrim, the townlands of— Ballymagarry, and Ballymurphy.
1922–1950	The divisions of Falls (Falls and Smithfield wards), St. Anne's (St. Anne's and St. George's wards) and Woodvale (Court and Woodale wards).
1950–1974	In the county borough of Belfast, the wards of Court, Falls, St. Anne's, St. George's, Smithfield, and Woodvale.
1974–1983	In the county borough of Belfast, the wards of Court, Falls, St Anne's, St George's, Smithfield, and Woodvale, and in the rural district of Lisburn, the electoral divisions of Andersonstown, Ballygammon, and Ladybrook.
1983–1997	The district of Belfast wards of Andersonstown, Ballygomartin, Central, Clonard, Court, Falls, Grosvenor, Highfield, Ladybrook, Milltown, North Howard, St James, Suffolk, and Whiterock.
1997–2010	The district of Belfast wards of Andersonstown, Beechmount, Clonard, Falls, Falls Park, Glencairn, Glencolin, Glen Road, Highfield, Ladybrook, Shankill, Upper Springfield and Whiterock, and the district of Lisburn wards of Collin Glen, Kilwee, Poleglass and Twinbrook.
2010–2024	The district of Belfast wards of Andersonstown, Beechmount, Clonard, Falls, Falls Park, Glencairn, Glencolin, Glen Road, Highfield, Ladybrook, Shankill, Upper Springfield and Whiterock; and the Lisburn city wards of Collin Glen, Dunmurry, Kilwee, Poleglass, and Twinbrook; and in Lisburn City, that part of Derryaghy ward lying to the north of the Derryaghy and Lagmore townland boundary.
2024–	The following wards of Belfast City Council— Andersonstown, Ballygomartin, Ballymurphy, Beechmount, Clonard, Collin Glen, Dunmurry, Falls, Falls Park, Ladybrook, Lagmore, Poleglass, Shankill, Shaw's Road, Stewartstown, Turf Lodge, Twinbrook, Woodvale. In the area of Lisburn and Castlereagh City Council, the Derryaghy ward.

== Members of Parliament ==
The Member of Parliament since a 2011 by-election is Paul Maskey of Sinn Féin, who succeeded Gerry Adams. Adams previously held the seat from 1983 to 1992 when he lost it to Joe Hendron of the Social Democratic and Labour Party but regained it in 1997.

In November 2010, Adams announced his intention to contest the imminent election in the Republic of Ireland. Although the Disqualifications Act 2000 permits MPs to sit in Dáil Éireann, he submitted a letter of resignation to the Speaker in January 2011. However, the prescribed procedure for vacating a parliamentary seat involves applying for the post of Crown Steward and Bailiff of the Manor of Northstead, which he had "no intention" of doing. Thus he was still considered to hold the seat. On 26 January, HM Treasury announced that Adams had been appointed as Steward and Bailiff of the Manor of Northstead. The Prime Minister, David Cameron, claimed that Adams had applied for the appointment, but this was later clarified to state that he had not requested the appointment. Adams stated the Prime Minister's private secretary had apologised to him for making the announcement that Adams had 'accepted' the position, when in fact Adams' resignation letter was taken to be a request to be so appointed, whatever his own wishes.

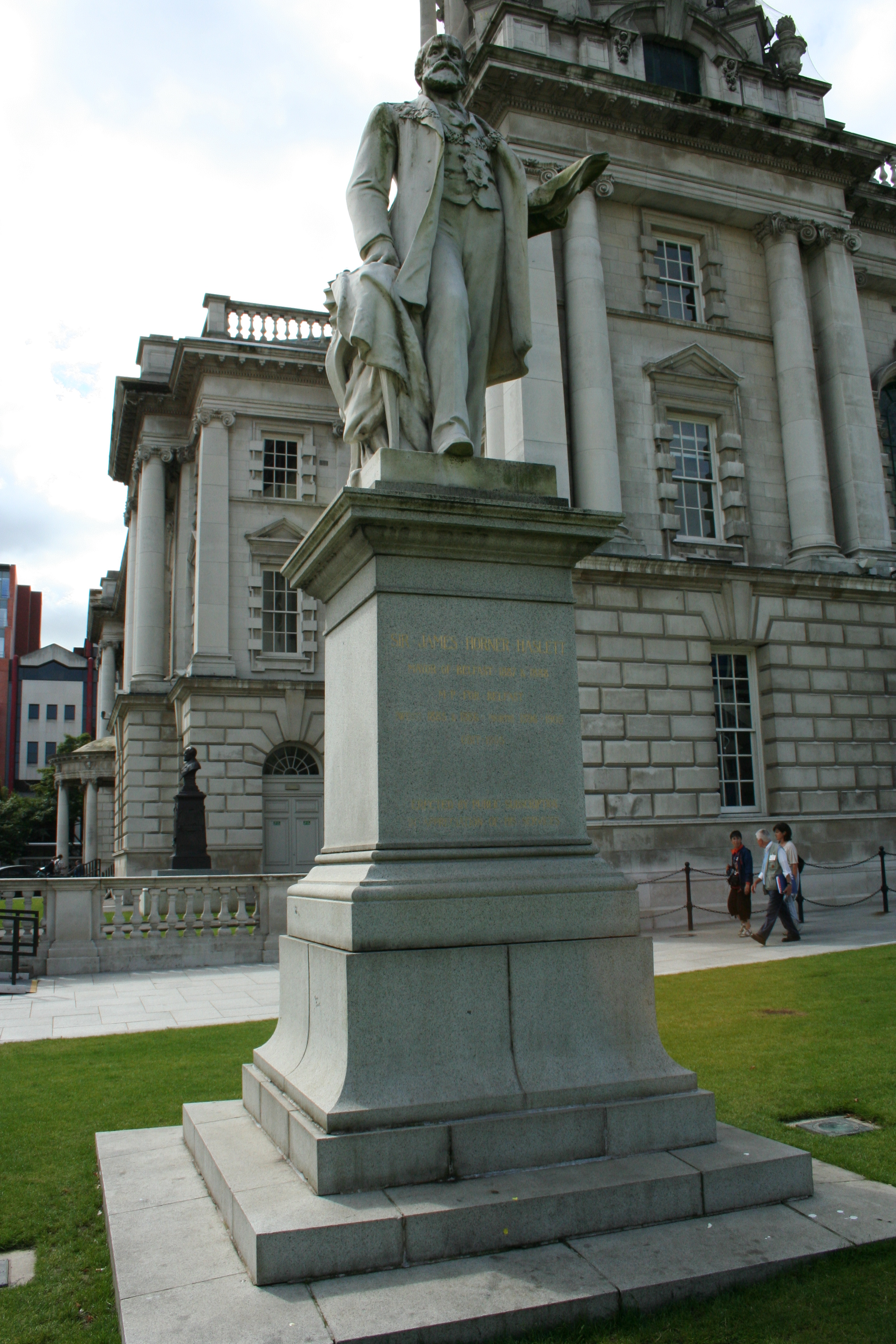
Monument to James Horner Haslett, MP & Mayor of Belfast, grounds of Belfast City Hall

Election	Member	Party
1885	James Horner Haslett	Conservative
1886	Thomas Sexton	Irish Parliamentary
1890	Thomas Sexton	Irish National Federation
1892	H. O. Arnold-Forster	Liberal Unionist
1906	Joseph Devlin	Irish Parliamentary
1918	constituency abolished	
1922	constituency recreated	
1922	Robert Lynn	Ulster Unionist
1929	W. E. D. Allen	Ulster Unionist
1931	W. E. D. Allen	New Party
1931	Alexander Browne	Ulster Unionist
1943 by-election	Jack Beattie	Labour (NI)
1943	Jack Beattie	Independent Labour
1945	Jack Beattie	Federation of Labour
1949	Jack Beattie	Irish Labour
1950	J. G. MacManaway	Ulster Unionist
1950 by-election	Thomas Teevan	Ulster Unionist
1951	Jack Beattie	Irish Labour
1955	Patricia McLaughlin	Ulster Unionist
1964	James Kilfedder	Ulster Unionist
1966	Gerry Fitt	Republican Labour
1970	Gerry Fitt	Social Democratic and Labour
1979	Gerry Fitt	Independent
1983	Gerry Adams	Sinn Féin
1992	Joe Hendron	Social Democratic and Labour
1997	Gerry Adams	Sinn Féin
2011 by-election	Paul Maskey	Sinn Féin

== Election results ==
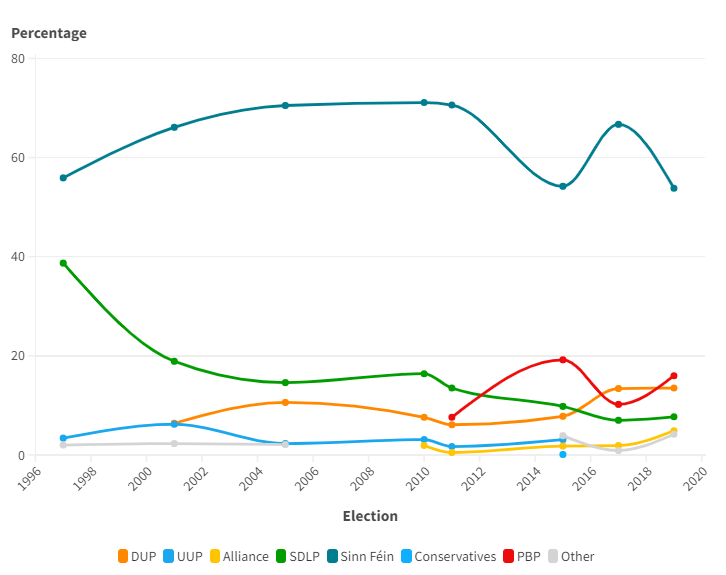

=== Elections in the 2020s ===
2024 general election: Belfast West
Party	Candidate	Votes	%	±%
Sinn Féin	Paul Maskey	21,009	52.9	▲4.4
People Before Profit	Gerry Carroll	5,048	12.7	▼1.4
SDLP	Paul Doherty	4,318	10.9	▲3.5
DUP	Frank McCoubrey	4,304	10.8	▼7.4
TUV	Ann McClure	2,010	5.1	new
Alliance	Eóin Millar	1,077	2.7	▼4.4
Aontú	Gerard Herdman	904	2.3	▼1.4
UUP	Ben Sharkey	461	1.2	▲0.3
Green (NI)	Ash Jones	451	1.1	new
Independent	Tony Mallon	161	0.4	new
Majority		15,961	40.2	▲2.4
Turnout		39,743	52.7	▼6.4
Registered electors		75,346		
Sinn Féin hold		Swing	▲2.9	

=== Elections in the 2010s ===
2019 general election: Belfast West
Party	Candidate	Votes	%	±%
Sinn Féin	Paul Maskey	20,866	53.8	−12.9
People Before Profit	Gerry Carroll	6,194	16.0	+5.8
DUP	Frank McCoubrey	5,220	13.5	+0.1
SDLP	Paul Doherty	2,985	7.7	+0.7
Alliance	Donnamarie Higgins	1,882	4.9	+3.0
Aontú	Monica Digney	1,635	4.2	New
Majority		14,672	37.8	−15.5
Turnout		38,782	59.1	−6.3
Registered electors		65,621		
Sinn Féin hold		Swing		

This seat had the largest Sinn Féin vote share at the 2019 general election. It also saw the only increase in vote share for the DUP at the election.

2017 general election: Belfast West
Party	Candidate	Votes	%	±%
Sinn Féin	Paul Maskey	27,107	66.7	+12.5
DUP	Frank McCoubrey	5,455	13.4	+5.6
People Before Profit	Gerry Carroll	4,132	10.2	−9.0
SDLP	Tim Attwood	2,860	7.0	−2.8
Alliance	Sorcha Eastwood	731	1.9	+0.1
Workers' Party	Conor Campbell	348	0.9	−0.8
Majority		21,652	53.3	+18.3
Turnout		40,633	65.09	+8.8
Registered electors		62,423		
Sinn Féin hold		Swing	+12.5	

2015 general election: Belfast West
Party	Candidate	Votes	%	±%
Sinn Féin	Paul Maskey	19,163	54.2	−16.9
People Before Profit	Gerry Carroll	6,798	19.2	+11.6
SDLP	Alex Attwood	3,475	9.8	−6.6
DUP	Frank McCoubrey	2,773	7.8	+0.2
UUP	Bill Manwaring	1,088	3.1	0.0
UKIP	Brian Higginson	765	2.2	New
Alliance	Gerard Catney	636	1.8	−0.1
Workers' Party	John Lowry	597	1.7	New
NI Conservatives	Paul Shea	34	0.1	New
Majority		12,365	35.0	−19.7
Turnout		35,329	56.3	+2.3
Registered electors		62,697		
Sinn Féin hold		Swing	−14.0	

2011 Belfast West by-election
Party	Candidate	Votes	%	±%
Sinn Féin	Paul Maskey	16,211	70.6	−0.5
SDLP	Alex Attwood	3,088	13.5	−2.9
People Before Profit	Gerry Carroll	1,751	7.6	New
DUP	Brian Kingston	1,393	6.1	−1.5
UUP	Bill Manwaring	386	1.7	−1.4
Alliance	Aaron McIntyre	122	0.5	−1.4
Majority		13,123	57.1	+2.4
Turnout		22,951	37.5	−16.5
Registered electors		61,441		
Sinn Féin hold		Swing	+1.2	

2010 general election: Belfast West
Party	Candidate	Votes	%	±%
Sinn Féin	Gerry Adams	22,840	71.1	+2.5
SDLP	Alex Attwood	5,261	16.4	+0.3
DUP	William Humphrey	2,436	7.6	−3.3
UCU-NF	Bill Manwaring	1,000	3.1	+0.6
Alliance	Máire Hendron	596	1.9	+1.8
Majority		17,579	54.7	−1.2
Turnout		32,133	54.0	−13.5
Registered electors		59,522		
Sinn Féin hold		Swing	+1.1	

=== Elections in the 2000s ===
2005 general election: Belfast West
Party	Candidate	Votes	%	±%
Sinn Féin	Gerry Adams	24,348	70.5	+4.4
SDLP	Alex Attwood	5,033	14.6	−4.3
DUP	Diane Dodds	3,652	10.6	+4.2
UUP	Chris McGimpsey	779	2.3	−3.9
Workers' Party	John Lowry	432	1.3	−0.5
Rainbow Dream Ticket	Lynda Gilby	154	0.4	+0.2
Independent	Liam Kennedy	147	0.4	New
Majority		19,315	55.9	+8.7
Turnout		34,545	64.2	−4.5
Registered electors		53,536		
Sinn Féin hold		Swing	+4.4	

2001 general election: Belfast West
Party	Candidate	Votes	%	±%
Sinn Féin	Gerry Adams	27,096	66.1	+10.2
SDLP	Alex Attwood	7,754	18.9	−19.8
DUP	Eric Smyth	2,641	6.4	New
UUP	Chris McGimpsey	2,541	6.2	+2.8
Workers' Party	John Lowry	736	1.8	+0.2
Third Way	David Kerr	116	0.3	New
Rainbow Dream Ticket	Rainbow George Weiss	98	0.2	New
Majority		19,342	47.2	+30.0
Turnout		40,982	68.7	−5.6
Registered electors		59,617		
Sinn Féin hold		Swing	+15.0	

=== Elections in the 1990s ===
1997 general election: Belfast West
Party	Candidate	Votes	%	±%
Sinn Féin	Gerry Adams	25,662	55.9	+13.9
SDLP	Joe Hendron	17,753	38.7	−5.5
UUP	Frederick Parkinson	1,556	3.4	−8.2
Workers' Party	John Lowry	721	1.6	−0.3
Human Rights	Liam Kennedy	102	0.2	New
Natural Law	Mary Daly	91	0.2	−0.3
Majority		7,909	17.2	
Turnout		45,885	74.3	+1.1
Registered electors		61,785		
Sinn Féin gain from SDLP		Swing	−9.7	

1997 Changes are compared to the 1992 notional results shown below.

Notional 1992 UK general election result : Belfast West
Party	Candidate	Votes	%	±%
SDLP	N/A	20,045	44.2	N/A
Sinn Féin	N/A	19,027	42.0	N/A
UUP	N/A	5,275	11.6	N/A
Others	N/A	975	2.2	N/A
Majority		1,018	2.2	N/A

1992 general election: Belfast West
Party	Candidate	Votes	%	±%
SDLP	Joe Hendron	17,415	43.6	+7.9
Sinn Féin	Gerry Adams	16,826	42.1	+1.0
UUP	Fred Cobain	4,766	11.9	−6.8
Workers' Party	John Lowry	750	1.9	−2.5
Natural Law	Michael Francis Kennedy	213	0.5	New
Majority		589	1.5	
Turnout		34,545	73.2	+4.1
Registered electors		54,644		
SDLP gain from Sinn Féin		Swing		

=== Elections in the 1980s ===
1987 general election: Belfast West
Party	Candidate	Votes	%	±%
Sinn Féin	Gerry Adams	16,862	41.1	+4.2
SDLP	Joe Hendron	14,641	35.7	+11.1
UUP	Frank Millar	7,646	18.7	+13.2
Workers' Party	Mary McMahon	1,819	4.4	+0.1
Majority		2,221	5.4	−6.9
Turnout		40,968	69.1	−5.2
Registered electors		59,324		
Sinn Féin hold		Swing		

1983 general election: Belfast West
Party	Candidate	Votes	%	±%
Sinn Féin	Gerry Adams	16,379	36.9	New
SDLP	Joe Hendron	10,934	24.6	−14.4
Ind. Socialist	Gerry Fitt	10,326	23.3	−26.2
UUP	Thomas Passmore	2,435	5.5	−19.0
DUP	George Albert Haffey	2,399	5.4	−5.8
Workers' Party	Mary McMahon	1,893	4.3	−2.4
Majority		5,445	12.3	
Turnout		44,366	74.3	+13.7
Registered electors		59,675		
Sinn Féin gain from SDLP		Swing		

Following the 1979 election, Fitt became increasingly at odds with the SDLP and left it, continuing to sit as an independent socialist.

=== Elections in the 1970s ===
1979 general election: Belfast West
Party	Candidate	Votes	%	±%
SDLP	Gerry Fitt	16,480	49.5	+0.5
UUP	Thomas Passmore	8,245	24.8	New
DUP	Billy Dickson	3,716	11.2	−25.3
Republican Clubs	Brian Brennan	2,284	6.9	−1.1
Alliance	John Cousins	2,024	6.1	New
NI Labour	Derek O'Brien Peters	540	1.6	New
Majority		8,235	24.7	+12.2
Turnout		33,289	56.5	−10.7
Registered electors		58,884		
SDLP hold		Swing		

October 1974 general election: Belfast West
Party	Candidate	Votes	%	±%
SDLP	Gerry Fitt	21,821	49.0	+8.0
DUP	John McQuade	16,265	36.5	0.0
Republican Clubs	Kitty O'Kane	3,547	8.0	+1.5
Volunteer Political Party	Ken Gibson	2,690	6.0	New
Marxist–Leninist	Peter Donal Patrick Kerins	203	0.5	New
Majority		5,556	12.5	+8.0
Turnout		44,526	67.2	−4.3
Registered electors		66,279		
SDLP hold		Swing		

February 1974 general election: Belfast West
Party	Candidate	Votes	%	±%
SDLP	Gerry Fitt	19,554	41.0	
DUP	John McQuade	17,374	36.5	
Ind. Republican	Albert Price	5,662	11.9	
Republican Clubs	John Brady	3,088	6.5	
NI Labour	Billy Boyd	1,989	4.2	
Majority		2,180	4.5	
Turnout		47,667	71.5	−13.0
Registered electors		66,639		
SDLP gain from Republican Labour		Swing		

After the 1970 election Fitt left the Republican Labour Party to co-found the Social Democratic & Labour Party. The remains of Republican Labour had disintegrated by 1974.

1970 general election: Belfast West
Party	Candidate	Votes	%	±%
Republican Labour	Gerry Fitt	30,649	52.8	+0.8
UUP	Brian McRoberts	27,451	47.3	−0.7
Majority		3,198	5.5	+1.5
Turnout		58,100	84.5	+9.7
Registered electors		68,665		
Republican Labour hold		Swing		

=== Elections in the 1960s ===
1966 general election: Belfast West
Party	Candidate	Votes	%	±%
Republican Labour	Gerry Fitt	26,292	52.0	+23.7
UUP	James Kilfedder	24,281	48.0	+6.8
Majority		2,011	4.0	
Turnout		50,573	74.8	+0.1
Registered electors		67,588		
Republican Labour gain from UUP		Swing		

1964 general election: Belfast West
Party	Candidate	Votes	%	±%
UUP	James Kilfedder	21,337	41.2	−12.9
Republican Labour	Harry Diamond	14,678	28.3	New
NI Labour	Billy Boyd	12,579	24.3	New
Ind. Republican	Billy McMillen	3,256	6.3	New
Majority		6,659	12.9	−3.6
Turnout		51,850	74.7	+2.0
Registered electors		69,399		
UUP hold		Swing		

=== Elections in the 1950s ===
1959 general election: Belfast West
Party	Candidate	Votes	%	±%
UUP	Patricia McLaughlin	28,898	54.1	−4.2
Ind. Labour Group	John Joseph Brennan	20,062	37.6	New
Sinn Féin	Thomas Heenan	4,416	8.3	−6.1
Majority		8,836	16.5	−14.4
Turnout		53,376	72.7	−2.0
Registered electors		73,405		
UUP hold		Swing		

1955 general election: Belfast West
Party	Candidate	Votes	%	±%
UUP	Patricia McLaughlin	34,191	58.3	+8.3
Irish Labour	Jack Beattie	20,062	27.4	−22.6
Sinn Féin	Eamonn Boyce	8,447	14.4	New
Majority		18,141	30.9	+30.9
Turnout		62,700	74.7	−9.4
Registered electors		78,589		
UUP gain from Irish Labour		Swing		

1951 general election: Belfast West
Party	Candidate	Votes	%	±%
Irish Labour	Jack Beattie	33,174	50.0	+3.7
UUP	Thomas Teevan	33,149	50.0	−1.5
Majority		25	0.0	
Turnout		66,323	84.1	+0.5
Registered electors		78,828		
Irish Labour gain from UUP		Swing		

1950 Belfast West by-election
Party	Candidate	Votes	%	±%
UUP	Thomas Teevan	31,796	50.8	−0.7
Irish Labour	Jack Beattie	30,833	49.2	+2.9
Majority		913	1.4	−3.8
Turnout		62,629	79.8	−3.8
Registered electors		78,459		
UUP hold		Swing		

1950 general election: Belfast West
Party	Candidate	Votes	%	±%
UUP	J. G. MacManaway	33,917	51.5	+5.0
Irish Labour	Jack Beattie	30,539	46.3	−7.2
Sinn Féin	Jimmy Steele	1,482	2.2	New
Majority		3,378	5.2	
Turnout		65,938	83.6	+10.5
Registered electors		78,896		
UUP gain from Independent Labour		Swing		

=== Elections in the 1940s ===
1945 general election: Belfast West
Party	Candidate	Votes	%	±%
Independent Labour	Jack Beattie	30,787	53.5	New
UUP	Knox Cunningham	26,729	46.5	−16.1
Majority		4,058	7.0	
Turnout		57,516	73.1	+5.1
Registered electors		78,674		
Independent Labour gain from NI Labour		Swing		

Belfast West by-election, 1943
Party	Candidate	Votes	%	±%
NI Labour	Jack Beattie	19,936	46.2	New
UUP	Knox Cunningham	14,426	33.4	−29.2
Ind. Unionist Party	William McConnell Wilton	7,551	17.5	New
Ind. Republican	Hugh Corvin	1,250	2.9	−34.5
Majority		5,510	12.8	
Turnout		43,163	54.8	−13.2
Registered electors		78,763		
NI Labour gain from UUP		Swing		

=== Elections in the 1930s ===
1935 general election: Belfast West
Party	Candidate	Votes	%	±%
UUP	Alexander Browne	34,060	62.6	+4.0
Ind. Republican	Charles Leddy	20,313	37.4	−4.0
Majority		13,747	25.2	+8.0
Turnout		54,373	68.0	−0.1
Registered electors		79,902		
UUP hold		Swing		

1931 general election: Belfast West
Party	Candidate	Votes	%	±%
UUP	Alexander Browne	31,113	58.6	+0.7
Nationalist	Thomas Joseph Campbell	22,006	41.4	−0.7
Majority		9,107	17.2	+1.4
Turnout		53,119	68.1	−5.8
Registered electors		77,993		
UUP hold		Swing		

Note: The sitting MP, W.E.D. Allen, had joined the New Party earlier in 1931 but did not contest the seat at the general election.

=== Elections in the 1920s ===
1929 general election: Belfast West
Party	Candidate	Votes	%	±%
UUP	William Edward David Allen	33,274	57.9	+3.4
Nationalist	Frank C.J. MacDermot	24,177	42.1	New
Majority		9,097	15.8	+1.7
Turnout		57,451	73.9	−5.2
Registered electors		77,721		
UUP hold		Swing		

1924 general election: Belfast West
Party	Candidate	Votes	%	±%
UUP	Robert John Lynn	28,435	54.5	+1.6
NI Labour	Harry Midgley	21,122	40.4	−3.7
Sinn Féin	Patrick Nash	2,688	5.1	New
Majority		7,313	14.1	+8.3
Turnout		52,245	79.1	+8.8
Registered electors		66,010		
UUP hold		Swing		

1923 general election: Belfast West
Party	Candidate	Votes	%	±%
UUP	Robert John Lynn	24,975	52.9	N/A
Belfast Labour	Harry Midgley	22,255	47.1	N/A
Majority		2,720	5.8	N/A
Turnout		47,230	70.3	N/A
Registered electors		67,161		
UUP hold		Swing	N/A	

1922 general election: Belfast West
Party	Candidate	Votes	%	±%
UUP	Robert John Lynn	Unopposed		
Registered electors				
UUP win (new seat)				

=== Elections in the 1910s ===
December 1910 general election: Belfast West
Party	Candidate	Votes	%	±%
Irish Parliamentary	Joseph Devlin	4,543	52.7	−0.2
Irish Unionist	John Boyd Carpenter	4,080	47.3	+1.1
Majority		463	5.4	−1.3
Turnout		8,623	93.4	−1.8
Registered electors				
Irish Parliamentary hold		Swing		

January 1910 general election: Belfast West
Party	Candidate	Votes	%	±%
Irish Parliamentary	Joseph Devlin	4,651	52.9	+3.7
Irish Unionist	John Boyd Carpenter	4,064	46.2	−2.8
Ind. Nationalist	Patrick J. Magee	75	0.9	New
Majority		587	6.7	+6.5
Turnout		8,790	95.2	+0.6
Registered electors				
Irish Parliamentary hold		Swing		

=== Elections in the 1900s ===
1906 general election: Belfast West
Party	Candidate	Votes	%	±%
Irish Parliamentary	Joseph Devlin	4,138	49.2	N/A
Liberal Unionist	J. R. Smiley	4,122	49.0	N/A
Independent Liberal Unionist	Alexander Carlisle	153	1.8	N/A
Majority		16	0.2	N/A
Turnout		8,413	94.6	N/A
Registered electors		8,891		
Irish Parliamentary gain from Liberal Unionist		Swing	N/A	

1903 Belfast West by-election
Party	Candidate	Votes	%	±%
Liberal Unionist	H. O. Arnold-Forster	3,912	51.6	N/A
Irish Parliamentary	Patrick Dempsey	3,671	48.4	N/A
Majority		241	3.2	N/A
Turnout		7,583	88.0	N/A
Registered electors		8,617		
Liberal Unionist hold		Swing	N/A	

1900 general election: Belfast West
Party	Candidate	Votes	%	±%
Liberal Unionist	H. O. Arnold-Forster	Unopposed		
Registered electors				
Liberal Unionist hold				

=== Elections in the 1890s ===
1895 general election: Belfast West
Party	Candidate	Votes	%	±%
Liberal Unionist	H. O. Arnold-Forster	Unopposed		
Registered electors				
Liberal Unionist hold				

1892 general election: Belfast West
Party	Candidate	Votes	%	±%
Liberal Unionist	H. O. Arnold-Forster	4,266	55.5	+6.2
Irish National Federation	Thomas Sexton	3,427	44.5	−6.2
Majority		839	11.0	
Turnout		7,693	92.3	−0.7
Registered electors		8,334		
Liberal Unionist gain from Irish Parliamentary		Swing	+6.2	

=== Elections in the 1880s ===
1886 general election: Belfast West
Party	Candidate	Votes	%	±%
Irish Parliamentary	Thomas Sexton	3,832	50.7	+0.9
Irish Conservative	James Horner Haslett	3,729	49.3	−0.9
Majority		103	1.4	
Turnout		7,561	93.0	+0.5
Registered electors		8,131		
Irish Parliamentary gain from Irish Conservative		Swing	+0.9	

1885 general election: Belfast West
Party	Candidate	Votes	%	±%
Irish Conservative	James Horner Haslett	3,780	50.2	
Irish Parliamentary	Thomas Sexton	3,743	49.8	
Majority		37	0.4	
Turnout		7,523	92.5	
Registered electors		8,131		
Irish Conservative win (new seat)				

== See also ==
- List of parliamentary constituencies in Northern Ireland
