= Paul Maskey =

Irish politician (born 1967)

Paul Maskey MP
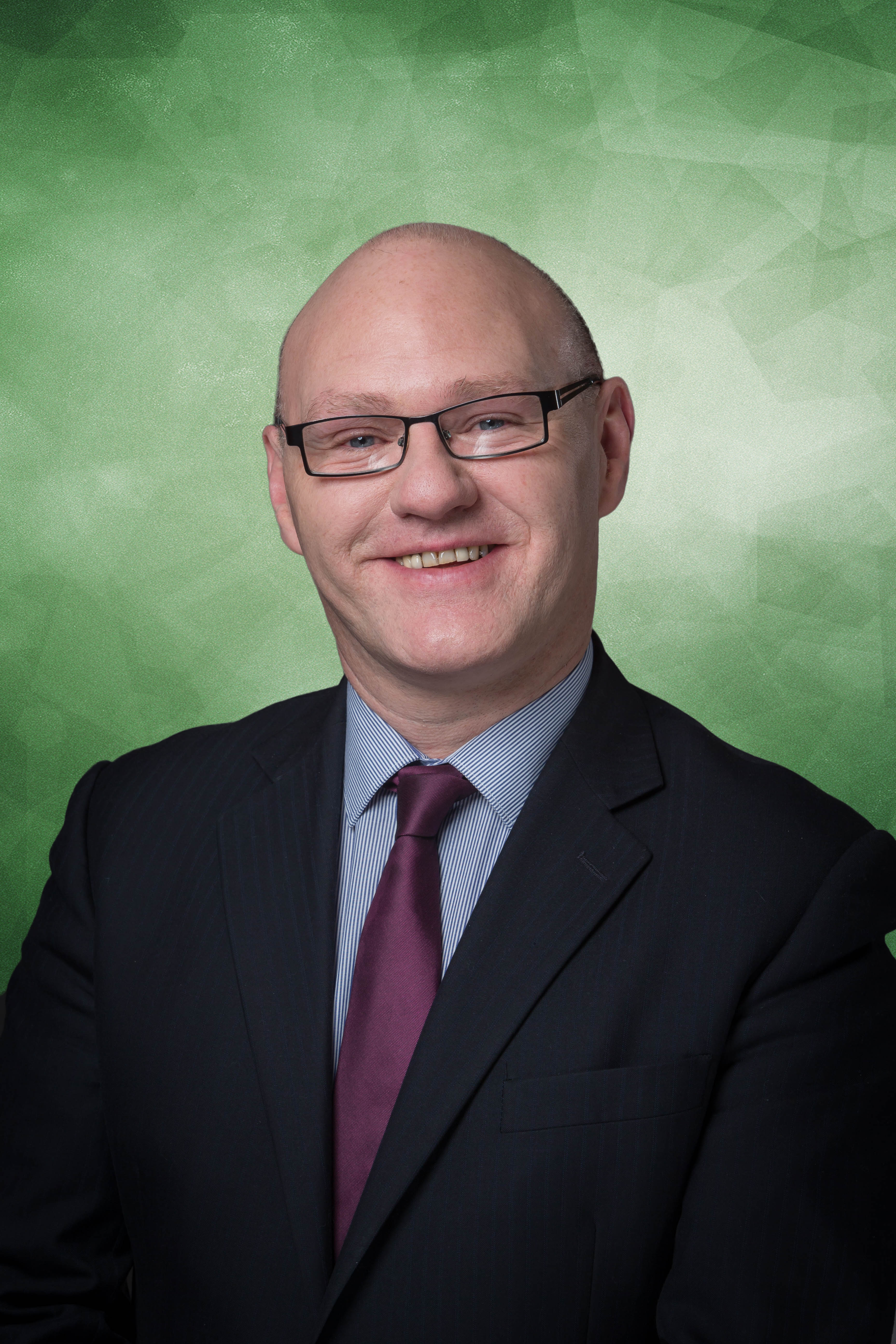
- Official portrait, 2015

Member of Parliament for Belfast West
- Incumbent
- Assumed office 9 June 2011
- Preceded by: Gerry Adams
- Majority: 15,961 (40.2%)

Member of the Northern Ireland Assembly for Belfast West
- In office 7 March 2007 – 2 July 2012
- Preceded by: Michael Ferguson
- Succeeded by: Rosie McCorley

Personal details
- Born: Paul John Maskey; 10 June 1967 (age 59)
- Party: Sinn Féin
- Relations: Alex Maskey (brother)

Paul John Maskey (born 10 June 1967) is an Irish Sinn Féin politician who has been Member of Parliament (MP) for Belfast West since 2011. He served as a Sinn Féin member of the Northern Ireland Assembly for Belfast West from 2007 to 2012. In line with Sinn Féin's policy of abstentionism, he has not taken his seat in the House of Commons. Maskey is a candidate in the 2027 Northern Ireland Assembly election in Belfast West.

== Belfast City Council ==
At the local elections of 7 June 2001, Maskey was elected as a Sinn Féin councillor for the Upper Falls electoral area on Belfast City Council, topping the poll on first preferences. He became chairman of the Belfast Waterfront Hall Board, helping to guide the venue to be ranked as the best congress centre in the UK and the fifth best in the World at the final of the Apex Award 2004 – World's Best Congress Centre awards, organised by the International Association of Congress Centres.

He was also chairman of the Client Services committee of Belfast City Council. But in January 2005, he could not win committee or council support for a proposal costing £175,000 to convert the minor hall used by the Group Theatre at the Ulster Hall into dual-purpose performance space during the refurbishment of the Hall. From 2005 he was leader of the Sinn Féin group on the City Council. Maskey resigned his seat on 14 September 2009.

== Tourism ==
Maskey has been employed by Fáilte Feirste Thiar ('Welcome to West Belfast'), an agency promoting tourism into that part of the city. As development co-ordinator in 2004 he helped launch an initiative under which 120 local businesses agreed to accept the euro, to help encourage visitors from across the border and elsewhere in the Eurozone.

In December 2005, as chair of the West Belfast Partnership, he linked up with Shankill Tourism to set up an Arts and Heritage trail which included both the Shankill Road and Falls Road areas.

He welcomed publication of a tourist map of Belfast in 2006 which included a Gaeltacht Quarter in west Belfast, and in 2008 the group published a map and guide to all gable end murals in the west of Belfast.

== Northern Ireland Assembly ==
Maskey was elected to the Northern Ireland Assembly in the 2007 elections as part of a Sinn Féin team which won five out of the six seats in Belfast West. After a Public Accounts Committee report criticised the waste of money on a project to build a campus of the University of Ulster on one of the peace lines at Springvale in north Belfast, Maskey placed the blame on the SDLP Minister Carmel Hanna. He became chairman of the committee in May 2008. In July 2009, he supported a committee investigation into the £33 million paid annually in legal fees and compensation to people claiming for tripping on pavements.

Under Maskey's chairmanship the committee held a detailed scrutiny of Northern Ireland Water in 2010, after it awarded 70 contracts without competition. Maskey denounced the situation as "absolutely staggering" and said that he could not remember "a more serious case of complete disregard for public sector ethics." The committee held a meeting to question officers of NI Water which took three and a half hours; Maskey joked at the end that the officers would need an "articulated lorry" to send all the information requested by MLAs.

When Maskey organised a protest against a parade by Royal Irish Regiment soldiers returning from Iraq and Afghanistan in October 2008, he explained that he wanted "a peaceful, dignified protest" against the wars, but that he did want to see British forces returning without injury. In December 2010, Maskey criticised other political parties in Northern Ireland for seeking to keep the details of people who funded them confidential; he said that "justifiable public cynicism is generated when it is perceived that political parties are not being open about their financial affairs." He was re-elected in 2011, topping the poll with 5,343 first preference votes. He was again named as Chairperson of the Public Accounts Committee in the new mandate.

== Parliamentary career ==
At the 2011 Belfast West by-election, Maskey was elected to Parliament as MP for Belfast West with 70.6% of the vote and a majority of 13,123. He was re-elected as MP for Belfast West at the 2015 general election with a decreased vote share of 54.2% and a decreased majority of 12,365. Maskey was again re-elected at the snap 2017 general election, with an increased vote share of 66.7% and an increased majority of 21,652. He was again re-elected at the 2019 general election, with a decreased vote share of 53.8% and a decreased majority of 14,672. Maskey was again re-elected at the 2024 general election, with a decreased vote share of 52.9% and an increased majority of 15,961.

== Personal life ==
Maskey is married to his wife, Patricia. They have two children together and live in Andersonstown, Belfast.

Northern Ireland Assembly
Preceded by Michael Ferguson	MLA for Belfast West; 2007–2012	Succeeded by Rosie McCorley
Parliament of the United Kingdom
Preceded by Gerry Adams	Member of Parliament for Belfast West; 2011–present	Incumbent
