= Ulster Political Research Group =

Political body in Northern Ireland

The Ulster Political Research Group is an advisory body connected to the Ulster Defence Association (UDA), providing advice to them on political matters. The group was permanently founded in January 2002, and is largely a successor to the Ulster Democratic Party (which had been dissolved in 2001).

== Origins ==
The group had its origins in the earlier New Ulster Political Research Group (NUPRG), which was set up, on the initiative of UDA chairman Andy Tyrie, in January 1978 under the chairmanship of Glenn Barr, largely as a reaction to antagonism that had grown between the UDA and Ian Paisley after the paramilitary group had supported a failed strike organised by Paisley the previous year. Barr's old friends Tommy Lyttle and Harry Chicken both took up seats on the NUPRG whilst South Belfast Brigadier and Tyrie's deputy John McMichael was appointed secretary of the new body.

After a few months McMichael wrote about the progress of the group in the UDA's Ulster magazine and stated that they had examined the case for direct rule from Westminster and found it to be wholly unsatisfactory. According to McMichael the future lay in "a special type of negotiated independence". Tyrie also began to argue for independence and Barr, who had advocated this Ulster nationalism for some time, gave indications to Magill magazine that this was the direction in which the NUPRG was going. Their March 1979 report, Beyond the Religious Divide, argued the case for independence and even provided an outline of the workings of such a state, basing it largely on the US model of a Supreme Court, written constitution and bill of rights and the separation of the executive and judicial arms of government. The document also called for a power-sharing arrangement that would take account of the wishes of the Catholic minority.

The group fielded three candidates in the 1981 local elections, with one of them holding the seat that he had won in a by-election three months before the local elections. However the NUPRG were disbanded soon afterwards and replaced with the Ulster Loyalist Democratic Party, a group that took Beyond the Religious Divide as the basis of its ideology.

== Re-establishment ==
The Ulster Democratic Party, which had succeeded the earlier Ulster Loyalist Democratic Party, dissolved in 2001 and the UPRG was re-established soon afterwards.

The UPRG came to wider prominence in 2003 after West Belfast brigadier Johnny Adair had been expelled from the movement and the UDA leadership decided to present a more civilian face. On 22 February 2003 a new one-year ceasefire extension was announced at a hotel in east Belfast but this was presented as a UPRG event, with journalists' questions being answered by the likes of Frank McCoubrey, Sammy Duddy, Frankie Gallagher, Jim Wright and Tommy Kirkham, all of whom had emerged as the leading figures in the group. The ceasefire was indefinitely extended in January 2004 and once again it was left to the UPRG to make the announcement.

Although the UPRG is not a registered political party some members have gained elected office. McCoubrey was a UPRG member of Belfast City Council ostensibly as an independent (and was formerly deputy Lord Mayor of the city) until joining the Democratic Unionist Party in November 2012, whilst Kirkham (a member of Newtownabbey Borough Council until losing his seat in the 2011 local elections) is also registered as the leader of the Ulster Protestant League, a title he has never used in elections.

== 2006 split ==
In October 2006, the UDA South East Antrim Brigade announced it would not for now give its support to the UPRG, but would henceforth align itself with a new body named Beyond Conflict, founded by Tommy Kirkham and other UDA leading members. After this announcement, tabloid media reported that Beyond Conflict supposedly stated that it could take eight million pounds and five years after the South East Antrim Brigade would cease all activity. The report was completely repudiated by academics who say the figure was never justified by facts.

== 2007 funding row ==
In March 2007 the British government announced plans to give £1 million to a Farset Youth and Community Development project designed to move the UDA away from paramilitarism. The announcement followed an initiative by the UPRG to consult with UDA activists, culminating in the publication of a business plan to facilitate a Conflict Transformation Initiative. The move was supported by Chief Constable Hugh Orde who was seen to shake hands with Jackie McDonald, a senior loyalist believed to be the UDA's leading figure in the south of the city, in direct contrast to the statement by leading Police Service of Northern Ireland officer Det Supt Esmond Adair, who claimed that the UDA was still heavily involved in extortion.

This led Margaret Ritchie Minister for Social Development to say that she would pull the plug on the £1.2m project run by Farset, if the UDA did not begin to decommission in 60 days. She further called on the group to begin a meaningful dialogue with the Independent International Commission on Decommissioning, the group responsible for overseeing decommissioning and led by General John de Chastelain. McDonald had stated that he was reluctant to see the UDA decommission because of the threat posed by dissident republican groups.
