= Sammy Duddy =

Northern Irish loyalist

- Sammy Duddy
- Born: Samuel Andrew Duddy; 25 August 1945; Belfast, Northern Ireland
- Died: 17 October 2007 (aged 62); Royal Victoria Hospital, Belfast, Northern Ireland
- Known for: Ulster Defence Association (UDA) member Ulster Political Research Group (UPRG) member
- Spouse: Roberta
- Children: 4

Andrew Samuel Duddy (25 August 1945 – 17 October 2007), known as Sammy, was a Northern Irish actor, having joined the Ulster Defence Association (UDA) shortly after its formation in 1971. He later became a leading member of the Ulster Political Research Group (UPRG), which provided political advice to that organisation.

== Early years ==
Duddy was born in Belfast, Northern Ireland, and grew up in a large Ulster Protestant family in the "Hammer" area of the city, located in the lower Shankill Road. He had eight siblings. His father was originally from Derry but had settled in Belfast and served in the B Specials during World War II. Duddy was born shortly after the war ended.

He attended a local secondary modern school where he displayed a talent for writing, and would often compose valentines for his classmates in return for Dinky cars or pens. At the age of 15, Duddy was apprenticed to a letterpress printer. His father held the same occupation.

== Role in loyalism ==
Duddy was initially known in Belfast for his drag queen act, performing in the city's clubs and pubs as "Samantha". His costume consisted of a long, black wig, fishnet tights, prosthetic breasts and heavy make-up. He once performed for British troops on tour.

At the outbreak of the violent religious and political conflict known as "the Troubles" in the late 1960s, he became involved in loyalist vigilante groups. He joined the paramilitary organisation, the Ulster Defence Association (UDA) in 1971, the year it was formed. By that point living in the Westland estate, a loyalist enclave in north Belfast close to the republican Ardoyne and Newington areas, he was sworn in as a UDA member at a ceremony in the Westland community centre at which he had to swear allegiance to the movement on a Bible in the presence of a UDA colonel.

Known as a "court jester" by his associates, he never took much of an active military role in the UDA, although he was considered "handy with his fists". On one occasion during the Ulster Workers' Council Strike in May 1974, he physically barred Reverend Ian Paisley from entering the Vanguard Unionist Progressive Party headquarters where an important meeting was being held by the Ulster Workers' Council Co-Ordinating Committee and chaired by Glenn Barr. In the course of the general strike, which effectively brought Northern Ireland to a standstill, he was among those who manned the many street barricades that were set up. On the first full day of the strike he had assisted in the hijacking of a bakery van. Duddy and the others, however, paid the driver for the loaves of bread he was in the process of delivering.

Duddy, who was known as a literate and well-spoken individual from his involvement in the Westland housing association, was in the early 1970s employed by then UDA leader Andy Tyrie to work as part of his staff at the UDA headquarters at 254A Shankill Road. He rose to prominence within the organisation in the late 1970s and early 1980s when he served as the UDA's public relations officer along with Hester Dunn. At that time the UDA was legal, and would remain so until 1992. Duddy went on to serve as the editor of UDA magazine Ulster for a time and in 1983 published a book of his poetry entitled Concrete Whirlpools of the Mind which received praise for its sensitive treatment of the problems for young working-class men drawn into violence. To avoid any possible implication in the Kincora Boys' Home scandal, Duddy ended the drag act in 1981 under orders from Tyrie, who also told him to grow a moustache and drop his voice.

He was briefly a suspect in the UDA killing of Catholic lawyer, Pat Finucane in 1989; UDA brigadier Ken Barrett was later convicted of the shooting. From 1989 to 1990, he spent 11 months in jail on remand following his arrest during the John Stevens inquiry into collusion between loyalist paramilitaries and the Royal Ulster Constabulary and British Army. He was charged with possession of classified security force documents which had been passed to the UDA and contained the names of republicans which the UDA used to target Provisional IRA members. The charges against him were dropped in October 1990 and he was released.

Duddy retired from active loyalism in the 1990s, but was recalled by the UPRG to help rebuild their image after the collapse of the Ulster Democratic Party and the split from Johnny Adair and John White. He was the North Belfast representative for the UPRG. At the height of the fall-out in 2002, his home in Rathcoole, north Belfast, was hit with a pipe bomb. That same year, shots were fired through his front door by masked gunmen; although he was unharmed, his seven-year-old pet chihuahua dog "Bambi" died within an hour after being hit by gunfire. Another dog, "Pepsi" was injured in the attack but survived. According to Johnny Adair, Duddy never got over the loss of "Bambi".

== Death ==
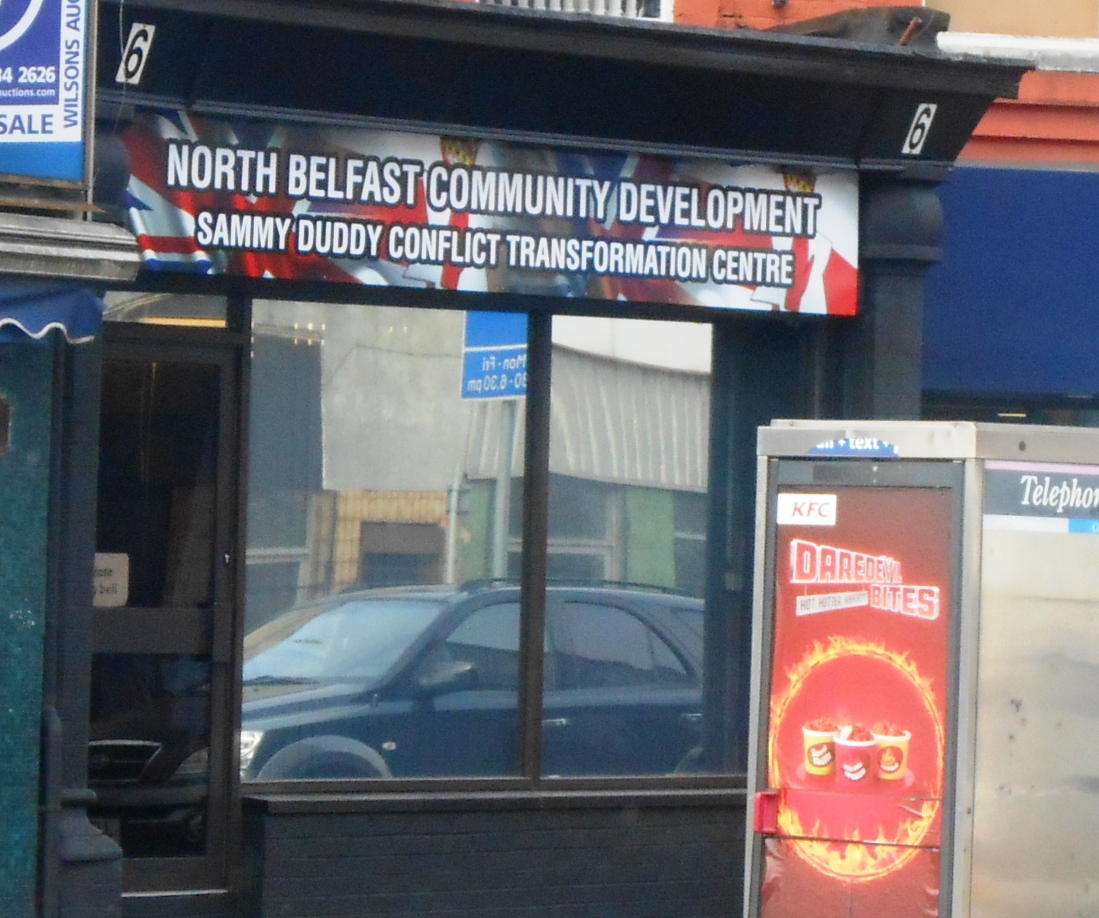
Sammy Duddy Conflict Transformation Centre

He died at the Royal Victoria Hospital in Belfast on 17 October 2007, aged 62, after suffering a massive heart attack. Frankie Gallagher, a spokesman for the UPRG, stated, following Duddy's death: "He came out of retirement to pursue a peaceful path for his community and in pursuit of that he has given his life. It's a massive, massive loss for his community."

A Sammy Duddy Memorial Flute Band was established in his memory in February 2012. His name was also given to the Sammy Duddy Conflict Transformation Centre, the headquarters of the North Belfast UPRG on York Road.
