= Tommy Kirkham =

British politician

Member of Newtownabbey Borough Council
- In office 21 May 1997 – 5 May 2011
- Preceded by: Billy Boyd
- Succeeded by: Thomas Hogg
- Constituency: Macedon
- In office 17 May 1989 – 19 May 1993
- Preceded by: William McDonnell
- Succeeded by: Arthur Templeton
- Constituency: Antrim Line

Personal details
- Born: Rathcoole, Newtownabbey, Northern Ireland
- Party: Independent Unionist (since 2001); Ulster Democratic (1995 - 2001)
- Other political affiliations: DUP (before 1995)

Tommy Kirkham is a Northern Ireland loyalist political figure and former councillor. Beginning his political career with the Democratic Unionist Party, he was then associated with the Ulster Defence Association (UDA) and the Ulster Political Research Group although he has since been expelled from both groups. He was a former deputy mayor of Newtownabbey and sat on Newtownabbey Borough Council as an Independent Loyalist.

== DUP Councillor ==
Kirkham entered politics in 1989 when he was elected to Newtownabbey Borough Council as a DUP councillor representing the Antrim Line district electoral area. However he lost his seat at the 1993 local elections when, following boundary changes, he was one of three candidates not elected to the council from Antrim Line.

== UPRG activity ==
From his base in Rathcoole, Kirkham then became a member of the Ulster Democratic Party and stood as the party's candidate in a February 1995 by-election in Rathcoole but was unsuccessful. In 1996 he was an unsuccessful candidate in the Northern Ireland Forum election in East Antrim. He returned to the council at the 1997 local elections in the Macedon electoral area. In 2001, when the UDP was dissolved and the UDA Inner Council decided to bring back the UPRG, they chose Kirkham as one of the new faces to front the group. He became a leading spokesman for the UPRG whilst also serving as an independent on Newtownabbey Borough Council (with the UPRG not registered as a political party). He is registered as the leader of the Ulster Protestant League, although it is unclear whether or not this organisation exists beyond Kirkham, who is labelled as an Independent Unionist in Newtownabbey.

As a member of the council, Kirkham was twice deputy mayor of Newtownabbey, the first time in 1999 with the support of the Ulster Unionist Party (UUP) and again in 2010 with support from the Democratic Unionist Party (DUP). Kirkham's appointment was condemned by councillors representing that UUP and Alliance Party of Northern Ireland, who accused the DUP of blocking their access to leading posts by appointing an independent. In 2006, the DUP had initially intimated their support for a plan to endorse Kirkham as mayor of the town before abandoning the plan. He lost his seat in the 2011 elections.

Along with Frank McCoubrey and Frankie Gallagher, Kirham was one of the UPRG's three leading spokesmen and had been responsible for delivering statements from the UDA. As part of this three-man group he met with Irish Taoiseach Bertie Ahern in 2004, along with UDA leader Jackie McDonald and prisoners' spokesman Stanley Fletcher, in a meeting he described as 'historic, productive and amicable'. He was also involved in an initiative to move loyalism away from racism, joining David Ervine in backing the Loyalist Commission-led scheme that started up in response to allegations of links between the UDA and Combat 18 and the involvement of the Ulster Volunteer Force (UVF) in attacks on Belfast's Chinese community.

During the internal struggles within the UDA in late 2002 with regards to the attempts to expel Johnny Adair, Kirkham followed the orthodox anti-Adair line as espoused by his close friend John 'Grug' Gregg. As a consequence of this position, his Carnmoney home was targeted for a gun attack by Adair's supporters over Christmas 2002, although no one was injured in the assault.

He remained an important spokesman for the UPRG, particularly following the removal of Johnny Adair in early 2003, and in February of that year it was Kirkham who was chosen to read a statement from the UDA leadership in which they announced an indefinite extension to their ceasefire.

== Split and Beyond Conflict ==
Kirkham eventually split from the UPRG and made his power base in South East Antrim with one of the UDA's six brigades, the South East Antrim Brigade where the UDA had drifted from the leadership. Kirkham became head of a new group which he called Beyond Conflict and, as leader of this group, asked for £8 million of government money to transform the group into a development agency. However whilst the government did eventually pledge money to the UPRG no funding was extended to Kirkham's group.

Kirkham's split from the mainstream of the UPRG and UDA would be widened in 2007. The UDA faced a potential feud over the activities of renegade brigadier Andre Shoukri, who was, ironically given Kirkham's previous position, an associate of Johnny Adair, until the movement expelled him in 2007. Kirkham however, as leader of the south-east Antrim brigade of the UDA, supported Shoukri in his struggles with the UDA leadership and a stand-off between Kirkham and the leaders developed. This came to a head in March 2007 when the expulsion was extended to Kirkham and his associate Gary Fisher. Kirkham reacted to the move by vowing to remain in his area. Later that same year Kirkham's assistant Jon McDowell outed himself as a Special Branch agent.

Kirkham remains as head of Beyond Conflict and has argued that the group has undertaken eight steps towards demilitarisation, including ending paramilitary activity in his area, working with the Independent International Commission on Decommissioning and working on cultural diversity programmes.

In December 2010 Kirkham gave evidence at a historical murder trial of a Catholic killed in Belfast in 1973. Kirkham was threatened with arrest if he did not appear at the trial.

== See also ==
- Ulster Political Research Group
- UDA South East Antrim Brigade
- Ulster Defence Association
- Shoukri brothers
