= Hugh Corvin =

Irish republican leader

Hugh Christopher Corvin (25 December 1899 – September 1975) was an Irish republican leader.

Born at 21 Violet Street in Belfast on 25 December 1899, Corvin was the son of Peter Corvin, an RIC constable, and Lucy Mooney.

Corvin began working for the Inland Revenue in Dublin at the age of 15. There, he joined the Gaelic League and the Irish Volunteers, participating in the Easter Rising.

During the Irish War of Independence, Corvin was based in Galway, then, in 1920, he returned to Belfast, where he became quartermaster of the third northern division of the Irish Republican Army (IRA). An opponent of the Anglo-Irish Treaty, he became the IRA's Belfast secretary in 1923. Still working for the Inland Revenue, he later claimed that he was working on the returns of Ulster Unionist Party politician Dawson Bates when he was arrested on Bates' orders, later that year. He was interned at Larne, becoming the officer commanding anti-treaty IRA internees there. In April 1924, he was moved to Derry Gaol, during which time he was a leader of the republican internees, alongside Dan Turley. While inside, he stood for Sinn Féin in Belfast North at the 1924 general election, but took only 3.4% of the votes cast, the party's worst result at the election.

Corvin was released on Christmas Eve 1924, at which time the northern IRA was reorganised; he became the first Officer Commanding its new Belfast Brigade. He had been able to complete his accountancy qualification while interned and founded his own company, later known as Corvin & Co. In 1926, he stood down from his IRA positions, to focus on his business interests.

Living on the Antrim Road, Corvin spoke the Irish language at home, was very active in the Gaelic Athletic Association, and served in succession as the president, secretary and treasurer of the Belfast branch of the Gaelic League. From the 1930s, he began supporting Fianna Fáil, and later in the decade, he was a leading figure in the Northern Council for Unity, a short-lived split from the Nationalist Party.

Corvin served as Eamon Donnelly's election agent in his campaign for Belfast Falls at a 1942 by-election to the Northern Ireland House of Commons. Donnelly won the seat, and his supporters then nominated Corvin for the British House of Commons at the 1943 Belfast West by-election, although the IRA repudiated his candidacy. He took only 2.9% of the vote and a distant fourth place in the contest. Despite this, he remained close to some IRA members, and during World War II, he organised the Green Cross Fund to assist the families of republican internees. In 1946, he acted as a pall bearer at the funeral of Seán McCaughey, the last person to die on hunger strike in independent Ireland.

Corvin's son, Donal, became a well known DJ and pop music journalist.

Military offices
Preceded by New position	Officer Commanding the Belfast Brigade of the Irish Republican Army; 1924 – 1926	Succeeded by Dan Turley
