= Alexander Dempsey =

Sir Alexander Dempsey, M.D. FRSM, JP (born 1852, Ballymoney, County Antrim — died 1920) was an Irish physician, hospital administrator and magistrate.

Educated at St Malachy's College, the Catholic University Medical School, Dublin and Queen's College, Galway, he earned the degree of Doctor of Medicine of the Royal University and the Diploma of the Royal College of Surgeons in Ireland in 1874.

In 1874 he set up his own medical practice on Donegall Street, Belfast. He was a founder member, secretary and later president of the North of Ireland Branch of the British Medical Association. He was president of the Ulster Medical Association from 1880 to 1891. In 1880 he was named as a magistrate for the City of Belfast.

== Awards/affiliations ==
In 1911, he was knighted. He became a Justice of the peace and was a fellow of the Royal Society of Medicine (London) and the Royal Academy of Medicine (Ireland).
