= William Humphrey (Northern Ireland politician) =

Politician (born 1967)

William Humphrey MBE
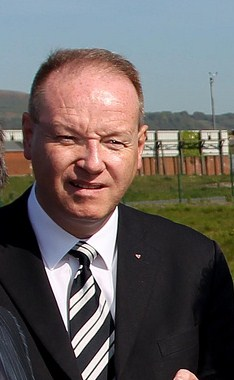

Member of the Northern Ireland Assembly for Belfast North
- In office 14 September 2010 – 28 March 2022
- Preceded by: Nigel Dodds
- Succeeded by: Brian Kingston

Deputy Lord Mayor of Belfast
- In office June 2010 – June 2011
- Preceded by: Danny Lavery
- Succeeded by: Ruth Patterson

High Sheriff of Belfast
- In office January 2006 – January 2007
- Preceded by: David Browne
- Succeeded by: Jim Kirkpatrick

Member of Belfast City Council
- In office 5 May 2005 – 27 September 2013
- Preceded by: Chris McGimpsey
- Succeeded by: Nicola Verner
- Constituency: Court

Personal details
- Born: October 17, 1967 (age 58) Woodvale, Belfast, Northern Ireland
- Party: Democratic Unionist Party
- Occupation: Politician

William Joseph Humphrey MBE (born 17 October 1967) is a former Democratic Unionist Party (DUP) politician who was a Member of the Northern Ireland Assembly (MLA) for North Belfast from 2010 to 2022. He was a Belfast City Councillor for the Court DEA from 2005 to 2013.

== Background ==
Born in the Woodvale area of Belfast, Humphrey studied at the Boys' Model School. A member of the Woodvale Residents' Association, he joined the Democratic Unionist Party, becoming its chairman in North Belfast, and a member of the party's executive. He was elected to Belfast City Council in the Court district at the 2005 Northern Ireland local elections, then served as High Sheriff of Belfast in 2006.

At the 2007 Northern Ireland Assembly election, Humphrey stood in North Belfast, but was not elected. He moved to contest West Belfast at the UK general election, 2010, but took only 7.6% of the votes cast. In June, he became Deputy Lord Mayor of Belfast.

In September 2010, he was selected to replace Nigel Dodds in the Northern Ireland Assembly, representing North Belfast and was elected at the 2011 Assembly election. Referencing his predecessor, Humphrey said, "Nigel has a proven track record of dedicated hard work on the ground, making a difference in peoples' lives within the Constituency...That will be the record I will strive to emulate."

Humphrey was appointed Member of the Order of the British Empire (MBE) in the 2021 New Year Honours for public service, particularly during the COVID-19 response.

In 2022, Humphrey announced that he would not contest the 2022 Assembly election.

Northern Ireland Assembly
Preceded by Nigel Dodds	MLA for Belfast North; 2010–2022	Succeeded by Brian Kingston
Civic offices
Preceded by David Browne	High Sheriff of Belfast; 2006	Succeeded by Jim Kirkpatrick
Preceded by Danny Lavery	Deputy Lord Mayor of Belfast; 2010–2011	Succeeded by Ruth Patterson
