= 1903 Belfast West by-election =

UK Parliamentary by-election

The 1903 Belfast West by-election was a Parliamentary by-election held on 23 October 1903. The constituency returned one Member of Parliament (MP) to the House of Commons of the United Kingdom, elected by the first past the post voting system.

== Vacancy ==
Under the provisions of the Succession to the Crown Act 1707 and a number of subsequent Acts, MPs appointed to certain ministerial and legal offices were at this time required to seek re-election. The by-election in Belfast West was caused by the appointment on 6 October 1903 of the sitting Liberal Unionist MP, H. O. Arnold-Forster as Secretary of State for War. Arnold-Forster had been Member of Parliament for the constituency since the 1892 general election.

== Candidates ==
The Liberal Unionist Party re-selected H.O. Arnold-Forster to defend the seat. Arnold-Forster did not return to Belfast during the campaign, having strained his heart. It was announced that he was ill in London, but that he attended the War Office daily.

The Nationalist candidate was Patrick Dempsey. Dempsey was a businessman and the brother of Alexander Dempsey, a senior hospital consultant and of Belfast Alderman James Dempsey. He was selected by a nominating convention of the United Irish League attended by John Redmond MP. His candidacy was announced only three days before polling. Dempsey had the Roman Catholic Bishop of Down and Connor, Henry Henry campaigning for him through the Belfast Catholic Association, though it was viewed that this intervention was unhelpful to Dempsey due to Henry's "quixotic" anti-Parnellite campaigning tactics.

== Result ==
The result was declared on Saturday 24 October, the count being postponed overnight to prevent rioting.

1903 Belfast West by-election
Party	Candidate	Votes	%	±%
Liberal Unionist	H. O. Arnold-Forster	3,912	51.6	N/A
Irish Parliamentary	Patrick Dempsey	3,671	48.4	New
Majority		241	3.2	N/A
Turnout		7,583	88.0	N/A
Registered electors		8,617		
Liberal Unionist hold		Swing	N/A	
