= 1950 Belfast West by-election =

UK parliamentary by-election

There was a by-election for Belfast West constituency on 29 November 1950. It occurred after the winner at the 1950 United Kingdom general election, James Godfrey MacManaway, was disqualified as he was a priest. It was won by Thomas Teevan representing the Unionists.

== Background ==
MacManaway won the Belfast West seat at the 1950 general election. He had been ordained as an Anglican priest in the Church of Ireland by the Archbishop of Armagh in 1925 but later left the priesthood.

Shortly after his election, the House of Commons referred the election to a select committee to determine if his election was valid as the House of Commons (Clergy Disqualification) Act 1801 formally banned any Church of England clergyman (which the Church of Ireland was united with as the state church of the United Kingdom at the time, before disestablishment under the Irish Church Act 1869) from being an MP. Due to the committee finding the law ambiguous, the Home Secretary referred the matter to the Judicial Committee of the Privy Council. The Privy Council ruled that because MacManaway had received episcopal ordination by a church that was the established church at the time of the act's passage, he was legally a priest under the 1801 act and was thus disqualified from being an MP.

Under the law, MacManaway was liable for a £500 fine for each of the five times that he voted in the Commons while his case was being decided. The government announced that they would bring in legislation to indemnify MacManaway so he would not have to pay any fines. This was done through the passage of the Reverend J. G. MacManaway's Indemnity Act 1951.

== Result ==
Thomas Teevan, the Unionist candidate, narrowly beat Jack Beattie, a former MP for the constituency who was the candidate of the Irish Labour Party, by 913 votes. However Beattie beat Teevan at the 1951 general election.

Belfast West by-election, 1950
Party	Candidate	Votes	%	±%
UUP	Thomas Teevan	31,796	50.8	–0.7
Irish Labour	Jack Beattie	30,833	49.2	+2.9
Majority		913	1.6	–3.8
Turnout		62,629	79.8	−3.8
Registered electors		78,459		
UUP hold		Swing		
