= Ulster Unionist Party election results =

UK political party election results

This article lists the Ulster Unionist Party's election results in UK parliamentary elections.

== Summary of general election performance ==
Year	Number of Candidates	Total votes	Average votes per candidate	% UK vote	% NI vote	Change (percentage points)	Saved deposits	Number of MPs (out of NI total)
1970	12	422,041	35,170	1.5	?	?	?	8 / 12
1974 Feb	7	232,103	33,158	0.8	?	-0.7	?	7 / 12
1974 Oct	7	256,065	36,580	0.9	?	+0.1	?	6 / 12
1979	11	254,578	23,143	0.8	?	-0.1	?	5 / 12
1983	16	259,952	16,247	0.8	?	0.0	?	11 / 17
1987	12	276,230	23,019	0.8	?	0.0	?	9 / 17
1992	13	271,049	20,850	0.8	?	0.0	?	9 / 17
1997	16	258,349	16,147	0.8	?	0.0	?	10 / 18
2001	17	216,839	12,755	0.8	26.8	0.0	?	6 / 18
2005	18	127,414	7,079	0.5	17.8	-0.3	?	1 / 18
2010	17	102,361	6,021	0.3	15.2	-0.1	?	0 / 18
2015	15	114,935	7,662	0.4	16.0	0.1	13	2 / 18
2017	14	83,280	5,949	0.3	10.3	0.0	11	0 / 18
2019	16	93,123	5,820	0.3	11.7	0.0	14	0 / 18

== Election results ==
=== 1922 general election ===
Constituency	Candidate	Votes	%	Position
Antrim	Charles Craig	unopposed	N/A	1
Antrim	Hugh O'Neill	unopposed	N/A	1
Armagh	William Allen	unopposed	N/A	1
Belfast East	Herbert Dixon	unopposed	N/A	1
Belfast North	Thomas McConnell	unopposed	N/A	1
Belfast South	Thomas Moles	unopposed	N/A	1
Belfast West	Robert Lynn	unopposed	N/A	1
Down	David Reid	unopposed	N/A	1
Down	John Simms	unopposed	N/A	1
Fermanagh and Tyrone	Charles Falls	38,640	23.1	3
Fermanagh and Tyrone	William Allen	38,589	23.1	4
Londonderry	Malcolm Macnaghten	30,743	75.7	1

=== 1923 general election ===
Constituency	Candidate	Votes	%	Position
Antrim	Charles Craig	unopposed	N/A	1
Antrim	Hugh O'Neill	unopposed	N/A	1
Armagh	William Allen	unopposed	N/A	1
Belfast East	Herbert Dixon	unopposed	N/A	1
Belfast North	Thomas McConnell	16,771	52.5	1
Belfast South	Thomas Moles	unopposed	N/A	1
Belfast West	Robert Lynn	24,975	52.9	1
Down	David Reid	unopposed	N/A	1
Down	John Simms	unopposed	N/A	1
Fermanagh and Tyrone	Charles Falls	37,733	23.1	3
Fermanagh and Tyrone	James Pringle	37,682	23.1	4
Londonderry	Malcolm Macnaghten	unopposed	N/A	1

=== 1924 general election ===
Constituency	Candidate	Votes	%	Position
Antrim	Charles Craig	60,868	49.0	1
Antrim	Hugh O'Neill	60,764	49.0	2
Armagh	William Allen	29,021	71.2	1
Belfast East	Herbert Dixon	unopposed	N/A	1
Belfast North	Thomas McConnell	34,182	96.6	1
Belfast South	Thomas Moles	unopposed	N/A	1
Belfast West	Robert Lynn	28,435	54.5	1
Down	David Reid	58,929	46.5	1
Down	John Simms	58,777	46.4	2
Fermanagh and Tyrone	Charles Falls	44,716	43.5	1
Fermanagh and Tyrone	James Pringle	44,711	43.4	2
Londonderry	Malcolm Macnaghten	30,875	82.9	1

=== By-elections, 1924–1929 ===
Election	Candidate	Votes	%	Position
1929 Londonderry by-election	Ronald Ross	unopposed	N/A	1

=== 1929 general election ===
Constituency	Candidate	Votes	%	Position
Antrim	Hugh O'Neill	53,864	37.5	1
Antrim	Joseph McConnell	52,851	36.8	2
Armagh	William Allen	29,966	67.4	1
Belfast East	Herbert Dixon	27,855	75.1	1
Belfast North	Thomas Somerset	27,812	62.1	1
Belfast South	William Stewart	24,019	62.9	1
Belfast West	W. E. D. Allen	33,274	57.9	1
Down	David Reid	54,073	36.3	1
Down	John Simms	53,943	36.2	2
Londonderry	Ronald Ross	unopposed	N/A	1

=== 1931 general election ===
Constituency	Candidate	Votes	%	Position
Antrim	Hugh O'Neill	unopposed	N/A	1
Antrim	Joseph McConnell	unopposed	N/A	1
Armagh	William Allen	unopposed	N/A	1
Belfast East	Herbert Dixon	28,431	75.1	1
Belfast North	Thomas Somerset	unopposed	N/A	1
Belfast South	William Stewart	unopposed	N/A	1
Belfast West	Alexander Browne	31,113	58.6	1
Down	David Reid	unopposed	N/A	1
Down	Robin Vane-Tempest-Stewart	unopposed	N/A	1
Fermanagh and Tyrone	Hugh Irwin	45,101	23.6	3
Fermanagh and Tyrone	Ynyr Burges	44,921	23.5	4
Londonderry	Ronald Ross	unopposed	N/A	1

=== 1935 general election ===
Constituency	Candidate	Votes	%	Position
Antrim	Hugh O'Neill	unopposed	N/A	1
Antrim	Joseph McConnell	unopposed	N/A	1
Armagh	William Allen	34,002	67.6	1
Belfast East	Herbert Dixon	unopposed	N/A	1
Belfast North	Thomas Somerset	unopposed	N/A	1
Belfast South	William Stewart	unopposed	N/A	1
Belfast West	Alexander Browne	34,060	62.6	1
Down	David Reid	66,324	43.5	1
Down	Robin Vane-Tempest-Stewart	58,777	46.4	2
Fermanagh and Tyrone	Roland Deane	46,625	24.0	3
Fermanagh and Tyrone	John Houston	46,000	23.7	4
Londonderry	Ronald Ross	unopposed	N/A	1

=== By-elections, 1935–1945 ===
Election	Candidate	Votes	%	Position
1939 Down by-election	James Little	unopposed	N/A	1
1940 Belfast East by-election	Henry Harland	unopposed	N/A	1
1943 Antrim by-election	John Dermot Campbell	42,371	69.4	1
1943 Belfast West by-election	Knox Cunningham	14,426	33.4	2

=== 1945 general election ===
Constituency	Candidate	Votes	%	Position
Antrim	Hugh O'Neill	57,259	43.1	1
Antrim	Samuel Gillmor Haughton	57,232	43.1	2
Armagh	William Allen	unopposed	N/A	1
Belfast East	Thomas Loftus Cole	21,443	56.4	1
Belfast North	William Neill	25,761	55.3	1
Belfast South	Conolly Gage	24,282	52.2	1
Belfast West	Knox Cunningham	26,729	46.5	2
Down	Walter Smiles	24,148	20.9	2
Down	John Blakiston Houston	22,730	19.6	3
Fermanagh and Tyrone	Thomas Lyons	46,392	22.8	3
Fermanagh and Tyrone	Noreen Cooper	46,260	22.8	4
Londonderry	Ronald Ross	40,214	50.8	1

=== By-elections, 1945–1950 ===
Election	Candidate	Votes	%	Position
1946 Down by-election	C. H. Mullan	50,699	51.4	1
1948 Armagh by-election	Richard Harden	36,200	59.7	1

=== 1950 general election ===
Constituency	Candidate	Votes	%	Position
Armagh	Richard Harden	unopposed	N/A	1
Belfast East	Alan McKibbin	29,844	63.3	1
Belfast North	H. Montgomery Hyde	36,412	64.4	1
Belfast South	Conolly Gage	34,620	75.2	1
Belfast West	J. G. MacManaway	33,917	51.5	1
Fermanagh and South Tyrone	Henry Richardson	29,877	48.1	2
Londonderry	Ronald Ross	36,602	62.6	1
Mid Ulster	John Shearer	29,721	47.4	2
North Antrim	Hugh O'Neill	unopposed	N/A	1
North Down	Walter Smiles	41,810	79.4	1
South Antrim	Douglas Savory	41,023	83.6	1
South Down	Lawrence Orr	38,508	63.5	1

=== By-elections, 1950–1951 ===
Election	Candidate	Votes	%	Position
1950 Belfast West by-election	Thomas Teevan	31,796	50.8	1

=== 1951 general election ===
Constituency	Candidate	Votes	%	Position
Armagh	Richard Harden	unopposed	N/A	1
Belfast East	Alan McKibbin	28,881	61.7	1
Belfast North	H. Montgomery Hyde	34,995	60.7	1
Belfast South	Conolly Gage	37,046	75.8	1
Belfast West	Thomas Teevan	33,149	50.0	2
Fermanagh and South Tyrone	Fredrick Patterson	30,268	47.9	2
Londonderry	William Wellwood	unopposed	N/A	1
Mid Ulster	John Shearer	29,701	47.3	2
North Antrim	Hugh O'Neill	unopposed	N/A	1
North Down	Walter Smiles	43,285	81.4	1
South Antrim	Douglas Savory	unopposed	N/A	1
South Down	Lawrence Orr	37,789	58.4	1

=== By-elections, 1951–1955 ===
Election	Candidate	Votes	%	Position
1951 Londonderry by-election	William Wellwood	unopposed	N/A	1
1952 North Antrim by-election	Phelim O'Neill	unopposed	N/A	1
1952 Belfast South by-election	David Campbell	23,067	75.1	1
1953 North Down by-election	George Currie	unopposed	N/A	1
1954 Armagh by-election	C. W. Armstrong	unopposed	N/A	1

=== 1955 general election ===
Constituency	Candidate	Votes	%	Position
Armagh	C. W. Armstrong	38,617	64.4	1
Belfast East	Alan McKibbin	26,938	62.5	1
Belfast North	H. Montgomery Hyde	33,745	63.3	1
Belfast South	David Campbell	33,392	78.4	1
Belfast West	Patricia McLaughlin	34,191	58.3	1
Fermanagh and South Tyrone	Robert Grosvenor	30,268	49.8	2
Londonderry	Robin Chichester-Clark	35,673	64.5	1
Mid Ulster	Charles Beattie	29,477	49.8	2
North Antrim	Phelim O'Neill	41,763	86.0	1
North Down	George Currie	50,315	96.9	1
South Antrim	Knox Cunningham	50,347	90.7	1
South Down	Lawrence Orr	37,921	65.9	1

Although Grosvenor failed to win Fermanagh and South Tyrone, he was declared elected after the winning candidate was found to be ineligible.

=== By-elections, 1955–1959 ===
Election	Candidate	Votes	%	Position
1955 Mid Ulster by-election	Charles Beattie	29,586	49.3	2
1959 Belfast East by-election	Stanley McMaster	19,524	57.8	1

Although Beattie failed to win Mid Ulster, he was declared elected after the winning candidate was found to be ineligible, but was then in turn disqualified as ineligible. A new by-election was held, which the Ulster Unionist Party did not contest.

=== 1959 general election ===
Constituency	Candidate	Votes	%	Position
Armagh	John Maginnis	40,325	85.5	1
Belfast East	Stanley McMaster	26,510	60.1	1
Belfast North	Stratton Mills	32,173	60.7	1
Belfast South	David Campbell	30,164	69.9	1
Belfast West	Patricia McLaughlin	28,898	54.1	1
Fermanagh and South Tyrone	Robert Grosvenor	32,080	81.4	1
Londonderry	Robin Chichester-Clark	37,529	73.0	1
Mid Ulster	George Forrest	33,093	70.0	1
North Antrim	Henry Clark	42,807	94.9	1
North Down	George Currie	51,773	98.0	1
South Antrim	Knox Cunningham	52,786	95.1	1
South Down	Lawrence Orr	36,875	85.4	1

=== By-elections, 1959–1964 ===
Election	Candidate	Votes	%	Position
1963 Belfast South by-election	Rafton Pounder	17,989	64.3	1

=== 1964 general election ===
Constituency	Candidate	Votes	%	Position
Armagh	John Maginnis	35,223	65.0	1
Belfast East	Stanley McMaster	24,804	58.8	1
Belfast North	Stratton Mills	29,976	59.6	1
Belfast South	Rafton Pounder	27,422	69.8	1
Belfast West	James Kilfedder	21,337	41.2	1
Fermanagh and South Tyrone	James Hamilton	30,010	55.1	1
Londonderry	Robin Chichester-Clark	37,700	64.1	1
Mid Ulster	George Forrest	29,715	51.6	1
North Antrim	Henry Clark	40,372	90.1	1
North Down	George Currie	45,091	73.5	1
South Antrim	Knox Cunningham	47,325	69.9	1
South Down	Lawrence Orr	32,922	59.0	1

=== 1966 general election ===
Constituency	Candidate	Votes	%	Position
Armagh	John Maginnis	34,687	72.0	1
Belfast East	Stanley McMaster	21,283	54.7	1
Belfast North	Stratton Mills	26,891	57.4	1
Belfast South	Rafton Pounder	23,329	65.4	1
Belfast West	James Kilfedder	24,281	48.0	2
Fermanagh and South Tyrone	James Hamilton	29,352	54.0	1
Londonderry	Robin Chichester-Clark	34,729	58.1	1
Mid Ulster	George Forrest	29,728	52.3	1
North Antrim	Henry Clark	31,927	78.1	1
North Down	George Currie	38,706	78.5	1
South Antrim	Knox Cunningham	40,840	64.3	1
South Down	Lawrence Orr	32,876	64.0	1

=== By-elections, 1966–1970 ===
Election	Candidate	Votes	%	Position
1969 Mid Ulster by-election	Anna Forrest	29,437	46.7	2

=== 1970 general election ===
Constituency	Candidate	Votes	%	Position
Armagh	John Maginnis	37,667	55.3	1
Belfast East	Stanley McMaster	26,778	59.5	1
Belfast North	Stratton Mills	28,668	48.5	1
Belfast South	Rafton Pounder	27,523	70.4	1
Belfast West	Brian McRoberts	27,451	47.3	2
Fermanagh and South Tyrone	James Hamilton	31,390	48.9	2
Londonderry	Robin Chichester-Clark	39,141	53.1	1
Mid Ulster	Neville Thornton	31,810	45.1	2
North Antrim	Henry Clark	21,451	36.6	2
North Down	James Kilfedder	55,679	69.0	1
South Antrim	James Molyneaux	59,589	61.2	1
South Down	Lawrence Orr	34,894	54.3	1

=== February 1974 general election ===
Constituency	Candidate	Votes	%	Position
Armagh	Harold McCusker	33,194	53.7	1
Belfast North	John Carson	21,531	43.7	1
Fermanagh and South Tyrone	Harry West	26,858	43.6	1
Londonderry	William Ross	33,060	52.7	1
North Down	James Kilfedder	38,169	61.1	1
South Antrim	James Molyneaux	48,203	67.6	1
South Down	Lawrence Orr	31,088	52.1	1

=== October 1974 general election ===
Constituency	Candidate	Votes	%	Position
Armagh	Harold McCusker	37,518	60.0	1
Belfast North	John Carson	29,662	62.6	1
Fermanagh and South Tyrone	Harry West	30,285	47.9	2
Londonderry	William Ross	35,138	54.4	1
North Down	James Kilfedder	40,996	72.0	1
South Antrim	James Molyneaux	48,892	71.5	1
South Down	Enoch Powell	33,614	50.8	1

=== 1979 general election ===
Constituency	Candidate	Votes	%	Position
Armagh	Harold McCusker	31,688	48.5	1
Belfast East	William Craig	15,930	31.2	2
Belfast North	Cecil Walker	10,695	25.3	2
Belfast South	Robert Bradford	28,875	61.7	1
Belfast West	Thomas Passmore	8,245	24.8	2
Fermanagh and South Tyrone	Raymond Ferguson	17,411	28.0	2
Londonderry	William Ross	31,592	49.7	1
North Antrim	Jeremy Burchill	15,398	23.4	2
North Down	Clifford Smyth	11,728	18.9	3
South Antrim	James Molyneaux	50,782	69.0	1
South Down	Enoch Powell	32,254	50.0	1

=== By-elections, 1979–1983 ===
Election	Candidate	Votes	%	Position
April 1981 Fermanagh and South Tyrone by-election	Harry West	29,046	48.8	2
August 1981 Fermanagh and South Tyrone by-election	Ken Maginnis	29,048	45.6	2
1982 Belfast South by-election	Martin Smyth	17,123	39.3	1

=== 1983 general election ===
Constituency	Candidate	Votes	%	Position
Belfast East	Jeremy Burchill	9,642	24.8	2
Belfast North	Cecil Walker	15,339	36.2	1
Belfast South	Martin Smyth	18,669	50.0	1
Belfast West	Thomas Passmore	2,435	5.5	4
East Antrim	Roy Beggs	14,293	37.4	1
East Londonderry	William Ross	19,469	37.9	1
Fermanagh and South Tyrone	Ken Maginnis	28,630	47.6	1
Lagan Valley	Jim Molyneaux	24,017	59.2	1
Mid Ulster	William Thompson	7,066	13.1	4
Newry and Armagh	Jim Nicholson	18,988	40.0	1
North Antrim	Robert Coulter	10,749	24.3	2
North Down	Robert McCartney	8,261	20.3	3
South Antrim	Clifford Forsythe	17,727	45.7	1
South Down	Enoch Powell	20,693	40.3	1
Strangford	John Taylor	19,086	48.8	1
Upper Bann	Harold McCusker	24,888	56.9	1

=== By-elections, 1983–1987 ===
Election	Candidate	Votes	%	Position
1986 Belfast North by-election	Cecil Walker	21,649	71.5	1
1986 Belfast South by-election	Martin Smyth	21,771	71.3	1
1986 East Londonderry by-election	Wiliam Ross	30,922	93.9	1
1986 Fermanagh and South Tyrone by-election	Ken Maginnis	27,857	49.7	1
1986 Lagan Valley by-election	Jim Molyneaux	32,514	90.7	1
1986 Newry and Armagh by-election	Jim Nicholson	20,111	40.3	2
1986 South Antrim by-election	Clifford Forsythe	30,087	94.1	1
1986 South Down by-election	Enoch Powell	24,963	48.4	1
1986 Strangford by-election	John Taylor	32,627	94.2	1
1986 Upper Bann by-election	Harold McCusker	29,311	80.8	1

=== 1987 general election ===
Constituency	Candidate	Votes	%	Position
Belfast North	Cecil Walker	14,355	39.0	1
Belfast South	Martin Smyth	18,917	57.8	1
Belfast West	Frank Millar	7,646	18.7	3
East Antrim	Roy Beggs	23,942	71.6	1
East Londonderry	William Ross	29,532	60.5	1
Fermanagh and South Tyrone	Ken Maginnis	27,446	49.6	1
Lagan Valley	Jim Molyneaux	29,101	70.7	1
Newry and Armagh	Jim Nicholson	19,812	37.9	2
South Antrim	Clifford Forsythe	25,395	69.8	1
South Down	Enoch Powell	25,848	45.7	2
Strangford	John Taylor	28,199	75.9	1
Upper Bann	Harold McCusker	25,137	61.5	1

=== By-elections, 1987–1992 ===
Election	Candidate	Votes	%	Position
1990 Upper Bann by-election	David Trimble	20,547	58.0	1

=== 1992 general election ===
Constituency	Candidate	Votes	%	Position
Belfast North	Cecil Walker	17,240	48.0	1
Belfast South	Martin Smyth	16,336	48.6	1
Belfast West	Fred Cobain	4,766	11.9	3
East Antrim	Roy Beggs	16,966	43.2	1
East Londonderry	William Ross	30,370	57.6	1
Fermanagh and South Tyrone	Ken Maginnis	26,923	48.8	1
Lagan Valley	Jim Molyneaux	29,772	60.8	1
Newry and Armagh	Jim Speers	18,982	36.1	2
North Antrim	Joe Gaston	8,216	18.1	2
South Antrim	Clifford Forsythe	29,956	70.9	1
South Down	Drew Nelson	25,181	40.9	2
Strangford	John Taylor	19,517	43.6	1
Upper Bann	David Trimble	26,824	59.0	1

=== By-elections, 1992–1997 ===
Election	Candidate	Votes	%	Position
1995 North Down by-election	Alan McFarland	7,232	26.4	2

=== 1997 general election ===
Constituency	Candidate	Votes	%	Position
Belfast East	Reg Empey	9,886	25.3	2
Belfast North	Cecil Walker	21,478	51.8	1
Belfast South	Martin Smyth	14,201	36.0	1
Belfast West	Fred Parkinson	1,556	3.4	4
East Antrim	Roy Beggs	13,318	38.8	1
East Londonderry	William Ross	13,558	36.0	1
Fermanagh and South Tyrone	Ken Maginnis	24,862	51.5	1
Lagan Valley	Jeffrey Donaldson	24,560	55.4	1
Newry and Armagh	Danny Kennedy	18,015	33.8	2
North Antrim	James Leslie	10,921	23.6	2
North Down	Alan McFarland	11,368	31.1	2
South Antrim	Clifford Forsythe	23,108	57.5	1
South Down	Dermot Nesbitt	16,248	32.8	2
Strangford	John Taylor	18,431	44.3	1
Upper Bann	David Trimble	20,836	43.6	1
West Tyrone	William Thompson	16,003	34.6	1

=== By-elections, 1997–2001 ===
Election	Candidate	Votes	%	Position
2000 South Antrim by-election	David Burnside	10,779	35.3	2

=== 2001 general election ===
Constituency	Candidate	Votes	%	Position
Belfast East	Tim Lemon	8,550	23.2	2
Belfast North	Cecil Walker	4,904	12.0	4
Belfast South	Martin Smyth	17,008	44.8	1
Belfast West	Chris McGimpsey	2,541	6.2	4
East Antrim	Roy Beggs	13,101	36.4	1
East Londonderry	William Ross	10,912	27.4	2
Fermanagh and South Tyrone	James Cooper	17,686	34.0	2
Foyle	Andrew Davidson	3,360	6.9	4
Lagan Valley	Jeffrey Donaldson	25,966	56.5	1
Newry and Armagh	Sylvia McRoberts	6,833	12.3	4
North Antrim	Lexie Scott	10,315	21.0	2
North Down	Sylvia Hermon	20,833	56.0	1
South Antrim	David Burnside	16,366	37.1	1
South Down	Dermot Nesbitt	9,173	17.6	3
Strangford	David McNarry	17,422	40.3	2
Upper Bann	David Trimble	17,095	33.5	2
West Tyrone	William Thompson	14,774	30.4	2

=== 2005 general election ===
Constituency	Candidate	Votes	%	Position
Belfast East	Reg Empey	9,275	30.1	2
Belfast North	Fred Cobain	2,154	7.1	4
Belfast South	Michael McGimpsey	7,263	22.7	3
Belfast West	Chris McGimpsey	779	2.3	4
East Antrim	Roy Beggs	8,462	26.6	2
East Londonderry	David McClarty	7,498	21.1	2
Fermanagh and South Tyrone	Tom Elliott	8,869	18.2	3
Foyle	Earl Storey	1,091	2.4	5
Lagan Valley	Basil McCrea	9,172	21.5	2
Mid Ulster	Billy Armstrong	4,853	10.7	4
Newry and Armagh	Danny Kennedy	7,025	13.9	4
North Antrim	Rodney McCune	6,637	14.5	3
North Down	Sylvia Hermon	16,268	50.4	1
South Antrim	David Burnside	11,059	29.1	2
South Down	Dermot Nesbitt	4,775	9.9	4
Strangford	Gareth McGimpsey	7,872	21.3	2
Upper Bann	David Trimble	11,281	25.5	2
West Tyrone	Derek Hussey	2,981	6.9	5

=== 2010 general election ===
Constituency	Candidate	Votes	%	Position
Belfast East	Trevor Ringland	7,305	21.2	3
Belfast North	Fred Cobain	2,837	7.7	4
Belfast South	Paula Bradshaw	5,910	17.3	3
Belfast West	Bill Manwaring	1,000	3.1	4
East Antrim	Rodney McCune	7,223	23.7	2
East Londonderry	Lesley Macaulay	6,218	17.8	3
Foyle	David Harding	1,221	3.2	5
Lagan Valley	Daphne Trimble	7,713	21.1	2
Mid Ulster	Sandra Overend	4,509	11.0	4
Newry and Armagh	Danny Kennedy	8,558	19.1	3
North Antrim	Irwin Armstrong	4,634	10.9	4
North Down	Ian Parsley	6,817	20.4	2
South Antrim	Reg Empey	10,353	30.4	2
South Down	John McCallister	3,093	7.3	4
Strangford	Mike Nesbitt	9,050	27.8	2
Upper Bann	Harry Hamilton	10,639	25.7	2
West Tyrone	Ross Hussey	5,281	14.2	3

Candidates stood as part of Ulster Conservatives and Unionists - New Force.

=== By-elections, 2010–2015 ===
Election	Candidate	Votes	%	Position
2011 Belfast West by-election	Bill Manwaring	386	1.7	5

=== 2015 general election ===
Constituency	Candidate	Votes	%	Position
Belfast South	Rodney McCune	3,549	9.1	5
Belfast West	Bill Manwaring	1,088	3.1	5
East Antrim	Roy Beggs, Jr.	6,308	18.8	2
East Londonderry	William McCandless	5,333	15.4	3
Fermanagh and South Tyrone	Tom Elliott	23,608	46.4	1
Foyle	Julie Kee	1,226	3.3	4
Lagan Valley	Alexander Redpath	6,055	15.2	2
Mid Ulster	Sandra Overend	6,318	15.4	2
Newry and Armagh	Danny Kennedy	16,312	32.7	2
North Antrim	Robin Swann	5,054	12.1	4
South Antrim	Danny Kinahan	11,942	32.7	1
South Down	Harold McKee	3,964	9.3	3
Strangford	Robert Burgess	4,868	14.3	2
Upper Bann	Jo-Anne Dobson	13,166	27.9	2
West Tyrone	Ross Hussey	6,144	15.9	4

=== 2017 general election ===
Constituency	Candidate	Votes	%	Position
Belfast East	Hazel Legge	1,408	3.3	3
Belfast South	Michael Henderson	1,527	3.5	6
East Antrim	John Stewart	4,544	11.9	3
East Londonderry	Richard Holmes	3,135	7.6	4
Fermanagh and South Tyrone	Tom Elliott	24,355	45.5	2
Lagan Valley	Robbie Butler	7,533	16.8	2
Mid Ulster	Mark Glasgow	3,017	6.5	4
Newry and Armagh	Sam Nicholson	4,425	8.3	4
North Antrim	Jackson Minford	3,482	7.2	3
South Antrim	Danny Kinahan	13,300	30.8	2
South Down	Harold McKee	2,002	3.9	4
Strangford	Mike Nesbitt	4,419	11.4	3
Upper Bann	Doug Beattie	7,900	15.4	3
West Tyrone	Alicia Clarke	2,253	5.2	4

=== By-elections, 2017–2019 ===
By-election	Candidate	Votes	%	Position
2018 West Tyrone by-election	Chris Smyth	2,909	8.3	4

=== 2019 general election ===
Constituency	Candidate	Votes	%	Position
Belfast East	Carl McClean	2,516	5.9	3
Belfast South	Michael Henderson	1,259	2.7	4
East Antrim	Steve Aiken	5,475	14.7	3
East Londonderry	Richard Holmes	3,599	9.2	5
Fermanagh and South Tyrone	Tom Elliott	21,929	43.2	2
Foyle	Darren Guy	1,088	2.3	7
Lagan Valley	Robbie Butler	8,606	19.0	3
Mid Ulster	Neil Richardson	2,611	5.9	5
Newry and Armagh	Sam Nicholson	4,204	8.3	5
North Antrim	Robin Swann	8,139	18.5	2
North Down	Alan Chambers	4,936	12.1	3
South Antrim	Danny Kinahan	12,460	29.0	2
South Down	Jill Macauley	3,307	6.6	5
Strangford	Philip Smith	4,023	10.7	3
Upper Bann	Doug Beattie	6,197	12.4	4
West Tyrone	Andy McKane	2,774	6.7	5
