= Northern Ireland Labour Party election results =

This article lists the Northern Ireland Labour Party's election results in UK parliamentary elections. Except where noted, candidates were endorsed by the British Labour Party.

== Summary of general election performance ==
Year	Number of Candidates	Total votes	Average votes per candidate	% UK vote	% NI vote	Change (percentage points)	Saved deposits	Number of MPs
1924	1	21,122	21,122	0.1	4.1	N/A	1	0
1931	1	9,410	9,410	0.0	3.3	N/A	1	0
1945	5	66,223	13,245	0.3	11.4	N/A	4	0
1950	5	67,816	13,563	0.2	12.1	-0.1	5	0
1951	4	62,324	15,581	0.2	13.5	0.0	4	0
1955	3	35,614	11,871	0.1	5.5	-0.1	3	0
1959	3	44,370	14,790	0.2	7.7	+0.1	3	0
1964	10	102,857	10,286	0.4	16.1	+0.3	6	0
1966	4	72,613	18,153	0.2	12.2	-0.2	4	0
1970	7	98,194	14,028	0.3	12.6	+0.1	6	0
1974 Feb	5	17,284	3,457	0.0	2.4	-0.3	1	0
1974 Oct	3	11,539	3,846	0.0	1.6	0.0	1	0
1979	3	4,441	1,480	0.0	0.6	0.0	0	0

== Election results ==
=== 1923 general election ===
Constituency	Candidate	Votes	%	Position
Belfast West	Harry Midgley	22,255	47.1	2

Midgley contested the election for the Belfast Labour Party, forerunner of the Northern Ireland Labour Party

=== 1924 general election ===
Constituency	Candidate	Votes	%	Position
Belfast West	Harry Midgley	21,122	40.4	2

Midgley was not endorsed by the British Labour Party.

=== 1931 general election ===
Constituency	Candidate	Votes	%	Position
Belfast East	John Campbell	9,410	24.9	2

=== By-elections, 1935–1945 ===
Election	Candidate	Votes	%	Position
1943 Antrim by-election	Robert Getgood	17,253	28.3	2
1943 Belfast West by-election	Jack Beattie	19,936	46.2	1

=== 1945 general election ===
Constituency	Candidate	Votes	%	Position
Antrim	Henry Holmes	18,403	12.8	3
Belfast East	Tom Boyd	17,338	43.6	2
Belfast North	William Leeburn	20,845	44.7	2
Belfast South	James Morrow	8,166	17.5	3
Londonderry	Milton Gordon	1,471	1.9	3

=== By-elections, 1945–1950 ===
Election	Candidate	Votes	%	Position
1946 Down by-election	Desmond Donnelly	28,846	29.3	2

=== 1950 general election ===
Constituency	Candidate	Votes	%	Position
Belfast East	Tom Boyd	17,338	36.7	2
Belfast North	William Leeburn	20,146	35.6	2
Belfast South	James McKernan	11,428	24.8	2
North Down	Albert McElroy	10,836	20.6	2
South Antrim	Edward Brown	8,068	16.4	2

=== 1951 general election ===
Constituency	Candidate	Votes	%	Position
Belfast East	Tom Boyd	17,910	38.3	2
Belfast North	James Morrow	22,685	39.3	2
Belfast South	Robert McBrinn	11,815	24.2	2
North Down	Albert McElroy	9,914	18.6	2

=== By-elections, 1951–1955 ===
Election	Candidate	Votes	%	Position
1952 Belfast South by-election	Sam Napier	7,655	24.9	2

=== 1955 general election ===
Constituency	Candidate	Votes	%	Position
Belfast East	Tom Boyd	13,041	30.2	2
Belfast North	Billy Boyd	15,065	28.2	2
Belfast South	Edward Brown	7,508	17.6	2

=== By-elections, 1955–1959 ===
Election	Candidate	Votes	%	Position
1959 Belfast East by-election	James Gardner	14,264	42.2	2

=== 1959 general election ===
Constituency	Candidate	Votes	%	Position
Belfast East	James Gardner	16,412	37.2	2
Belfast North	Jack McDowell	18,640	35.2	2
Belfast South	Norman Searight	9,318	21.6	2

=== By-elections, 1959–1964 ===
Election	Candidate	Votes	%	Position
1963 Belfast South by-election	Norman Searight	7,209	25.8	2

=== 1964 general election ===
Constituency	Candidate	Votes	%	Position
Armagh	Samuel Ewart	6,523	12.0	3
Belfast East	Samuel Watt	15,555	36.9	2
Belfast North	Jack McDowell	17,564	34.9	2
Belfast South	John Barkley	8,792	22.4	2
Belfast West	Billy Boyd	12,579	24.3	3
Fermanagh and South Tyrone	Baptist W. Gamble	2,339	4.3	4
Mid Ulster	Patrick McGarvey	5,053	8.8	3
North Down	Edward Bell	11,571	18.9	2
South Antrim	Sydney Stewart	16,531	24.4	2
South Down	Sam Thompson	6,260	11.2	3

=== 1966 general election ===
Constituency	Candidate	Votes	%	Position
Belfast East	Martin McBirney	17,650	45.3	2
Belfast North	David Overend	19,927	42.6	2
Belfast South	Erskine Holmes	12,364	34.6	2
South Antrim	Sydney Stewart	22,672	35.7	2

=== 1970 general election ===
Constituency	Candidate	Votes	%	Position
Armagh	Erskine Holmes	8,781	12.9	3
Belfast East	David Bleakley	18,259	40.5	2
Belfast North	John Sharkey	18,894	31.9	2
Belfast South	John Coulthard	11,567	29.6	2
North Antrim	Patrick McHugh	6,476	11.0	3
North Down	Kenneth Young	14,246	17.7	2
South Antrim	Robert Johnston	19,971	20.5	2

=== February 1974 general election ===
Constituency	Candidate	Votes	%	Position
Belfast East	David Bleakley	8,122	14.1	3
Belfast North	Sandy Scott	2,917	5.9	4
Belfast South	Erskine Holmes	2,455	4.7	5
Belfast West	Billy Boyd	1,989	4.2	5

=== October 1974 general election ===
Constituency	Candidate	Votes	%	Position
Belfast East	David Bleakley	7,415	13.9	3
Belfast North	Billy Boyd	2,481	5.2	4
Belfast South	Erskine Holmes	1,643	4.2	5

=== 1979 general election ===
Constituency	Candidate	Votes	%	Position
Belfast East	George Chambers	1,982	3.9	5
Belfast North	Alan Carr	1,889	4.4	7
Belfast West	Derek Peters	540	1.6	6
