= 1889 Belfast North by-election =

UK Parliamentary by-election

The 1889 Belfast North by-election was a parliamentary by-election held for the United Kingdom House of Commons constituency of Belfast North on 12 August 1889. The vacancy arose because of the death of the sitting member, Sir William Ewart of the Conservative party. Only one candidate was nominated, the shipbuilder Edward James Harland, also a Conservative, who was elected unopposed.

1889 Belfast North by-election
Party	Candidate	Votes	%	±%
Irish Conservative	Edward Harland	Unopposed		
Registered electors		6,469		
Irish Conservative hold				
