= List of Alliance Party MPs (UK) =

This is a list of Alliance MPs. It includes all members of Parliament elected to the British House of Commons representing the Alliance Party of Northern Ireland. Defections are also included.

== List ==
Member	Constituency	Years served
Sorcha Eastwood	Lagan Valley	2024–present
Stephen Farry	North Down	2019–2024
Naomi Long	Belfast East	2010–2015
Stratton Mills (Note: Elected as an Ulster Unionist in 1959. Left the party to become an 'Independent Unionist and Conservative' in 1972 before joining Alliance in 1973.)	Belfast North	1973–Feb 1974
