= Belfast Duncairn =

Belfast Duncairn can refer to:

- Belfast Duncairn (Northern Ireland Parliament constituency)
- Belfast Duncairn (UK Parliament constituency)
- Duncairn, Belfast, an electoral ward in Castle (District Electoral Area)
