= William Neill (politician) =

Politician in Northern Ireland (1889–1960)

The Right Honourable Sir William Neill JP DL

Deputy Lord Mayor of Belfast
- In office 1955

High Sheriff of Belfast
- In office 1954
- Preceded by: Robert Pierce
- Succeeded by: Robert Kinahan

Lord Mayor of Belfast
- In office 1946–1949
- Preceded by: Sir Crawford McCullagh
- Succeeded by: William E. G. Johnston

Member of Parliament for Belfast North
- In office 1945–1949

Personal details
- Born: 8 May 1889 Belfast, Ireland
- Died: 3 January 1960 (aged 70) SS Pretoria Castle
- Party: Ulster Unionist Party

Sir William Frederick Neill (8 May 1889 – 3 January 1960) was a unionist politician in Northern Ireland.

Neill studied at Belfast Model School before becoming an estate agent. He was elected as an Ulster Unionist Party alderman on the Belfast Corporation in 1938, and served as Lord Mayor of Belfast from 1946 to 1949. He was elected in the 1945 UK general election, for Belfast North, serving five years. He was knighted in 1948. In 1954, he served as High Sheriff of Belfast, and then as Deputy Lord Mayor the following year. Neill died on 3 January 1960 aboard the Union-Castle liner Pretoria Castle while returning home from overseas.

Parliament of the United Kingdom
Preceded by Thomas Somerset	Member of Parliament for Belfast North; 1945–1950	Succeeded by H. Montgomery Hyde
Civic offices
Preceded by Crawford McCullagh	Lord Mayor of Belfast; 1946–1949	Succeeded by W. E. G. Johnston
Preceded by Robert Pierce	High Sheriff of Belfast; 1954–1955	Succeeded by Robin Kinahan
