= Harland baronets =

Set index for Harland baronets

There have been three baronetcies created for persons with the surname Harland, one in the Baronetage of Great Britain and two in the Baronetage of the United Kingdom. All three creations are extinct.

- Harland baronets of Sproughton (1771)
- Harland baronets of Sutton Hall (1808)
- Harland baronets of Ormiston and Brompton (1885): see Sir Edward Harland, 1st Baronet (1831–1895)
