= John McQuade =

Northern Irish boxer and politician

Member of Parliament for Belfast North
- In office 3 May 1979 – 13 May 1983
- Preceded by: John Carson
- Succeeded by: Cecil Walker

Personal details
- Born: 11 September 1911
- Died: 19 November 1984 (aged 73)
- Party: Democratic Unionist Party (1971 - 1984)
- Other political affiliations: Official Unionist Party (until 1971)
- Profession: Soldier

John McQuade (9 August 1911 – 19 November 1984) was a Northern Irish unionist politician. He was a professional boxer under the name of Jack Higgins.

== Career ==
After serving with the British Army in Dunkirk and Burma, he was an Ulster Unionist Party (UUP) member of Belfast City Council from 1955 to 1972. He was a UUP Member of the House of Commons of Northern Ireland for Belfast Woodvale (Greater Shankill) from 1965 to October 1971, when he resigned from the UUP and joined the Democratic Unionist Party. On 28 March 1972 (the last day the Parliament sat), he resigned his parliamentary seat in protest at the prorogation of the Parliament.

In February 1972, in response to the escalating violence in Northern Ireland, he called for the British security forces to take over the town of Newry and for the border with the Republic of Ireland to be closed, stating his belief that the Roman Catholic Church controlled the government of the Republic of Ireland.

He contested the February and October 1974 Westminster elections unsuccessfully for Belfast West. He was elected as the Member of Parliament for Belfast North in 1979, aged 67, and served until 1983, when he retired. He died on 19 November 1984, aged 73.

== Bibliography ==
- Times Guide to the House of Commons, 1979
- Leigh Rayment's Historical List of MPs

Parliament of Northern Ireland
Preceded by Billy Boyd	Member of Parliament for Belfast Woodvale; 1965–1972	Parliament abolished
Northern Ireland Assembly (1973)
New assembly	Assembly Member for North Belfast; 1973–1974	Assembly abolished
Parliament of the United Kingdom
Preceded by John Carson	Member of Parliament for Belfast North; 1979–1983	Succeeded by Cecil Walker
