= 1921 Belfast Duncairn by-election =

UK Parliamentary by-election

The 1921 Belfast Duncairn by-election was held on 23 June 1921. The by-election was held due to the incumbent Ulster Unionist MP, Edward Carson, being appointed Lord of Appeal in Ordinary. It was won by the UUP candidate Thomas McConnell, who was unopposed. The seat was abolished in 1922.
