= Brian McRoberts =

Northern Irish politician (1931–1983)

Brian J. H. McRoberts (May 1931 – 1983) was a solicitor and unionist politician in Northern Ireland.

McRoberts studied at the Armagh Royal School, then at Queen's University Belfast, where he was active in the Unionist Society with Bob Cooper and Stratton Mills.

McRoberts' first political contest came when he stood unsuccessfully for the Ulster Unionist Party (UUP) in South Armagh at the 1962 Northern Ireland general election. He next stood for the UUP in Belfast West at the 1970 general election, when he was described by opponent Gerry Fitt as "one of the most reactionary candidates to contest Belfast West". His campaign headquarters were bombed on the election day, although there were no injuries. He was again unsuccessful in the election, although he took 47.2% of the vote.

McRoberts was involved in controversy when his secretary, Emily Roberts, obtained a newly built three-bedroom council house in Dungannon, despite being unmarried and only nineteen years old, and while many Roman Catholic families had been waiting for housing for years.

In his spare time, McRoberts was a prominent member of the Masonic Order.
