= William Blease, Baron Blease =

British politician (1914–2008)

The Right Honourable The Lord Blease JP

Member of the House of Lords
- Lord Temporal
- Life peerage 21 July 1978 – 16 May 2008

Personal details
- Born: 28 May 1914
- Died: 18 May 2008 (aged 93)

William John Blease, Baron Blease JP (28 May 1914 – 16 May 2008) was a trade unionist and politician from Northern Ireland.

Blease, the son of William John Blease and Sarah Watts, was educated at McClure Public Elementary School and Belfast Technical College, the National Council of Labour Colleges and then the Workers' Educational Association.

Blease worked first as a shop apprentice from 1929, becoming a grocer's assistant and grocery branch manager between 1938 and 1940. In 1940, he moved to Belfast shipyard, where he stayed as clerk until 1945. He then became branch manager of the Co-op Society of Belfast until 1959. In 1976, he was appointed as a justice of the peace for Belfast. He was also a member of the British Institute of Management.

An active trade unionist, Blease was elected to the Northern Ireland Committee of the Irish Congress of Trade Unions in 1959, remaining a member until 1975. That year, he joined the Independent Broadcasting Authority, a post he held for four years.

Blease also joined the Northern Ireland Labour Party. He stood unsuccessfully for the Parliament of Northern Ireland in Belfast Oldpark at the 1953 general election, and in 1965 his son William Victor Blease (usually known as Victor) was unsuccessful in Belfast St Anne's.

On 21 June 1978, he was created a life peer with the title Baron Blease, of Cromac in the City of Belfast. From 1979 to 1983, he was Opposition Spokesman on Northern Ireland and Labour Whip. The Queen's University of Belfast made him an honorary doctor of law and the New University of Ulster an honorary doctor of letters.

In 1985, Blease worked with Paddy Devlin to found the Labour Party of Northern Ireland and he remained a trustee of the group until its dissolution in 1990.

Lord Blease married Sarah Evelyn Caldwell in 1939. They had four children, three sons and one daughter. They remained married until his death on 16 May 2008.

== See also ==
- List of Northern Ireland Members of the House of Lords

Trade union offices
Preceded by William Leeburn	Northern Ireland Officer of the Irish Congress of Trade Unions; 1960–1975	Succeeded by Terry Carlin
