= New Ireland Group =

The New Ireland Group (now known as New Ireland Vision) was formed in 1982, seeking political and social reconciliation in Ireland, and the formation of an Ireland accommodating both the Gaelic Irish and Unionist traditions. The group predominantly of Presbyterian and Church of Ireland people based in the Northern Ireland who felt that the intractable problems could be tackled more appropriately by way of an all-Ireland agreement for a New Ireland in many ways reflecting on the vision of the United Irishmen.

It was formed by John Robb who became a member of the Seanad Éireann from 1982-1989. Evolving out of an earlier group called the New Ireland Movement. The group made a detailed submission to the New Ireland Forum in 1983.

Other figures include labour activist Jack McDowell, ecology campaigner Peter Emerson, Philip Orr, and Francis Gallagher.

The group produces a publication called The New Irelander. A number of its members actively support the De Borda Institute and in 1986 some of the de borda's electoral systems were tried out during the New Ireland Groups Peoples' Convention as an exercise in consensus decision making.

The group organises events in the Northern Ireland where speakers from different parts of Ireland and from different political and social backgrounds speak. Speakers have included people from other regions of conflict in the world, community groups in Ireland, and Irish people who served with the United Nations. Its members regularly make contributions to the media and presentations to government commissions.
