= John Carson (Northern Ireland politician) =

Northern Irish UUP politician

John Carson CBE

Lord Mayor of Belfast
- In office 1980–1981
- Preceded by: Billy Bell
- Succeeded by: Grace Bannister
- In office 1985–1986
- Preceded by: Alfie Ferguson
- Succeeded by: Sammy Wilson

Member of Belfast City Council
- In office 15 May 1985 – 21 May 1997
- Preceded by: District created
- Succeeded by: Danny Lavery
- Constituency: Castle
- In office 30 May 1973 – 15 May 1985
- Preceded by: District created
- Succeeded by: District abolished
- Constituency: Belfast Area H

Member of Parliament for North Belfast
- In office 28 February 1974 – 3 May 1979
- Preceded by: Stratton Mills
- Succeeded by: John McQuade

Personal details
- Born: August 27, 1933 (age 93) Belfast, Northern Ireland
- Party: Ulster Unionist

John Carson CBE (born 31 July 1933) is a former Northern Irish businessman and Ulster Unionist Party (UUP) politician.

== Career ==
A draper who owned a shop in the interface area of the Duncairn Gardens in north Belfast, Carson was elected to Belfast City Council in 1973. At the February 1974 general election, he was elected as a member of the United Ulster Unionist Coalition as the Member of Parliament for Belfast North. At the October 1974 general election, Carson was re-elected with a substantial increase in his majority.

However, he was de-selected in 1979, after voting in favour of the Labour government in the crucial vote of confidence, which they lost. In that year's general election, Belfast North was gained by Johnny McQuade of the Democratic Unionist Party, with Cecil Walker coming second for the UUP.

Despite this, Carson retained his popularity, topping the local government poll in the electoral area 'H', which included over half of the parliamentary seat. He also topped the poll in North Belfast at the 1982 Assembly elections.

Carson was twice Lord Mayor of Belfast first 1980-81 and second from 1985 to 1986, and in his capacity as a councillor, was sometimes at odds with his party colleagues. For example, he attended a City Hall lunch attended by the then Secretary of State Tom King, despite the Unionist policy of boycotting meetings with Government ministers in protest at the Anglo-Irish Agreement. For this, he was threatened with expulsion from the UUP, which never happened.

Carson remained a member of Belfast City Council until 1997, when he lost his seat after 24 consecutive years on the council.

== Personal life ==
Carson married Martha in 1953 and had two daughters (Gloria and Sharon). They celebrated their Diamond Anniversary in 2013.

Carson was appointed Commander of the Order of the British Empire (CBE) in the 1981 Birthday Honours.

== Sources ==
- The Times Guide to the House of Commons, Times Newspapers Ltd, October 1974
- Leigh Rayment's Historical List of MPs

Parliament of the United Kingdom
Preceded by William Stratton Mills	Member of Parliament for Belfast North; February 1974–1979	Succeeded by John McQuade
Northern Ireland Assembly (1982)
New assembly	MPA for North Belfast; 1982–1986	Assembly abolished
Civic offices
Preceded by John Allen	High Sheriff of Belfast; 1978–1979	Succeeded by Grace Bannister
Preceded by Billy Bell	Lord Mayor of Belfast; 1980 - 81	Succeeded by Grace Bannister
Preceded by Alfie Ferguson	Lord Mayor of Belfast; 1985 - 86	Succeeded by Sammy Wilson
