= Pretoria Castle =

Pretoria Castle may refer to one of the following ships:

- HMS Pretoria Castle (F47), a Union-Castle Line ocean liner acquired by the Royal Navy in World War II; employed as armed merchant cruiser; later converted to escort carrier; resold to Union-Castle in 1946; scrapped in 1962
- RMS Pretoria Castle, an ocean liner, launched in 1947, later renamed the S.A. Oranje, and scrapped in 1975
