= John Robb (surgeon) =

Irish politician and surgeon (1932–2018)

Senator
- In office 13 May 1982 – 1 November 1989
- Constituency: Nominated by the Taoiseach

Personal details
- Born: 24 February 1932 Downpatrick, County Down, Northern Ireland
- Died: 13 February 2018 (aged 85)
- Party: Independent
- Education: Queen's University Belfast
- Profession: Surgeon

John David Alexander Robb (24 February 1932 – 13 February 2018) was a surgeon from Ballymoney in County Antrim, Northern Ireland who served for seven years a member of Seanad Éireann, the upper house of the Oireachtas (the legislature of the Republic of Ireland).

== Career ==
A liberal Protestant in the all-Ireland tradition, Robb was educated at Rockport School, Holywood, County Down, and at Merchiston Castle School, Edinburgh. He then trained in medicine at Queen's University, Belfast and later specialised in surgery.

Later, he became a member of the Wolfe Tone Society in the 1960s. In the early 1980s he founded the New Ireland Group, which sought to promote a new vision of Ireland which would radically differ both from the Unionist viewpoint and from the Catholic and Gaelic vision. This was then perceived to be on offer as an alternative to Unionism.

In 1982, he was nominated by the Taoiseach Charles Haughey to be a member of the 16th Seanad. He was nominated to the 17th Seanad by the Fine Gael Taoiseach Garret FitzGerald, and by Haughey to the 18th Seanad. However, after the 1989 general election he was not nominated to the 19th Seanad.

He died on 13 February 2018.
