= Jack McDowell (politician) =

John William McDowell (c. 1922 – 14 August 2006) was a political activist in Northern Ireland.

Born on the Shankill Road in Belfast, McDowell studied at Queen's University Belfast and qualified as a teacher, working at the Jordanstown School for the Deaf, where he became vice-principal.

McDowell joined the British Army during World War II and served during the D-Day invasion. At the end of the war, he returned to teaching and followed his father in joining the Northern Ireland Labour Party (NILP). He stood in numerous elections for the party, but was never elected. For the Northern Ireland Parliament, he stood in Ards at the 1953 election, in the Belfast Duncairn in the 1956 by-election, in 1962 and 1965, then finally in Newtownabbey at the 1969 Northern Ireland general election. He also stood for the party in Belfast North at both the 1959 and 1964 Westminster general elections, taking second place on each occasion.

McDowell also served as vice-chairman of the NILP, and completed a second degree, in phonetics, at the University of Ulster. In 1982, he was a founder member of the New Ireland Group, and served on its executive until his death in 2006.

McDowell was survived by his wife Eleanor "Jean" (c. 1920–2014) and his five children. His son Michael (b. 1964) is a member of the Hole in the Wall Gang.
