= Thomas Somerset (Northern Ireland politician) =

Politician from Northern Ireland

Sir Thomas Somserset DL

Member of Parliament for North Belfast
- In office 1929–1945
- Preceded by: Thomas McConnell
- Succeeded by: William Frederick Neill

Personal details
- Born: 14 December 1870 Largymore, County Down, Ireland
- Died: 16 June 1947 (aged 76) Upper Malone Road, Belfast, Northern Ireland
- Party: Ulster Unionist Party
- Occupation: Politician and industrialist

Sir Thomas Somerset DL (14 December 1870 – 16 June 1947) was an industrialist and Ulster Unionist Member of Parliament (MP) for North Belfast from 1929 to 1945.

== Life and career ==
Thomas Somerset was the son of an engineer, James Somerset. Somerset was a native of Largymore, County Down. He established Thomas Somerset and Co. Ltd., linen manufacturers in 1891. This enterprise proved profitable, with factories at Belfast, Dublin, Greyabbey and Portaferry, giving employment to over 1,200 people. He was also a director of Commercial Insurance Co. of Ireland, Ltd., and Chairman of the Northern Counties Committee of the London, Midland and Scottish Railway.

Somerset was elected MP for North Belfast in 1929, holding his seat to 1945. He was knighted in 1936. Somerset died on 16 June 1947 at his home at The Weir on the Upper Malone Road, South Belfast.

== Family ==
Somerset married Ethel Parker of Cheshire and had two children, a son and daughter.

Parliament of the United Kingdom
Preceded by Thomas McConnell	Member of Parliament for Belfast North; 1929–1945	Succeeded by William Frederick Neill
