= H. Montgomery Hyde =

Irish politician, lawyer and author (1907–1989)

Harford Montgomery Hyde MP

Member of Parliament for Belfast North
- In office 23 February 1950 – 18 September 1959
- Preceded by: William Frederick Neill
- Succeeded by: Stratton Mills

Personal details
- Born: 14 August 1907 Belfast, Ireland
- Died: 10 August 1989 (aged 81) Kent, England
- Party: Ulster Unionist Party
- Spouses: Dorothy Mabel Brayshaw Crofts (m. 1939; div. 1952) Mary Eleanor Fischer (m. 1955; dis. 1966) Rosalind Roberts Dimond (m. 1966)
- Education: Queen's University Belfast; Magdalen College, Oxford
- Occupation: Politician
- Profession: Barrister, author

Harford Montgomery Hyde (14 August 1907 – 10 August 1989), born in Belfast, Ireland, was a barrister, politician (Ulster Unionist MP for Belfast North), prolific author and biographer. He was deselected by his party in 1959, losing his seat in the House of Commons, as a result of campaigning on homosexual law reform.

== Background ==
Born at 16 Malone Road in Belfast, Hyde was schooled in England at Sedbergh, Cumbria. His father, James Johnstone Hyde, was a linen merchant and Unionist councillor for Cromac. Hyde took pride in his family connection to the Irish linen trade. Although his mother came from a Protestant Home Rule background, all were involved in the 1914 UVF gun running, the seven-year-old Harford being a dummy casualty for first-aid practice. He attended Queen's University Belfast, where he gained a first-class history degree, and later Magdalen College, Oxford, where he attained a second-class law degree.

He was married in 1939 to Dorothy Mabel Brayshaw Crofts (divorced 1952); in 1955 to Mary Eleanor Fischer (dissolved 1966) and finally to Rosalind Roberts Dimond. By his will, the residue of his estate was left to his widow Robbie and his papers to the Public Record Office of Northern Ireland. Hyde when an MP lived at Bertha House, 71 Malone Road, Belfast.

== Early career ==
Hyde was called to the Bar in 1934, working briefly in London and on the North East circuit. His first salaried employment was with the 7th Marquess of Londonderry, whose wife Edith was a London political hostess, and whose influence on prominent Labour Party politician Ramsay MacDonald (who became prime minister) was held by some to be suspect. From 1935 until 1939, Hyde was librarian and private secretary to the marquess in his "appeasement" period, hired specifically to research the family papers and write its history. His works on the family included Londonderry House and its Pictures (1937), The Rise of Lord Castlereagh (1933), a book which remains very highly regarded, and The Londonderrys: A Family Portrait (1979).

== Secret intelligence agent ==
He joined the British Army Intelligence Corps in 1939, serving as an assistant censor in Gibraltar in 1940. He was then commissioned in the intelligence corps (MI6) and engaged in counter-espionage work in the United States under William Stephenson, the director of British Security Coordination in the Western Hemisphere. Hyde was also military liaison and security officer, Bermuda, from 1940 to 1941, confiscating the Vollard/Fabiani paintings collection. He was assistant passport control officer in New York from 1941 to 1942. He was with British Army Staff, US, from 1942 to 1944, attached to the Supreme HQ Allied Expeditionary Force in 1944, and then seconded to the Allied Control Commission for Austria until 1945 as a legal officer.

== Postwar work and writing ==
He continued writing and publishing during the war, and would be addressed as "Lt. Col. Hyde" throughout most of his parliamentary career. He would continue to cover the topic of espionage in his writings. He wrote Secret Intelligence Agent (1982, describing his war experiences) and a biography of a former colleague, Betty Pack, titled Cynthia: the Spy who Changed the Course of the War (1965).

After the war, he became assistant editor of the Law Reports until 1947, and was legal adviser to the British Lion Film Corporation, then managed by Alexander Korda, up to 1949. In 1948 he published The Trials of Oscar Wilde, a precursor of three further books about Wilde.

== Politics 1950–1959 ==
Hyde had planned a parliamentary career since the 1930s, and actively scouted for seats until the war intervened, postponing an election until 1945. He then applied for the South Belfast Unionist candidature, and was unfortunate enough to miss the nomination by only a single vote. Five years later, North Belfast was to select him. He could have expected to hold his seat for a quarter of a century or more. In the event, he represented the constituency for just nine years. His maiden speech was on the contentious subject of the difficulty of enforcement of Northern Ireland maintenance orders in Great Britain, and the consequent problem of border-hopping husbands.

He was a UK delegate to the Council of Europe Consultative Assembly in Strasbourg from 1952 to 1955, majoring on simplifying European visa and border controls. He was also an incessant traveller; a visit in 1958 to East Germany and Czechoslovakia got him into difficulty with political exiles, when he lamely defended himself saying, "There are terrible things going on. Cultural matters are a safe subject in common."

Hyde was Unionist MP for Belfast North, elected in 1950, and re-elected in 1951 and 1955.

== Deselection ==
He was deselected by his party in 1959, after arguing in favour of the decriminalisation of homosexuality in a debate about implementing the Wolfenden report on 26 November 1958, a debate he had been most prominent in seeking. Indeed, Hyde was the most vocal of any MP in the 1950s about homosexual law reform.

Hyde's reselection failed to be ratified by 171 votes to 152. He was absent for the vote, being on an international tour. The Belfast Telegraph reported, "Mr Hyde's rejection is a result of criticism amongst constituents over his attitude over certain problems particularly the Wolfenden report, capital punishment and the return of the Lane pictures to Ireland; further there was a feeling he did not visit the division sufficiently." One view expressed was that as the vote was so close he might have carried the day, had he been present.

Two days later, from Belize City, Hyde complained that it was a "rank discourtesy holding the meeting without him", especially as there were 3,000 members in the constituency. His wife in London the next day said, "I shall advise him to cut out the rest of his tour if that is possible and deal with the matter on the spot." She had however written earlier to him in Jamaica: "SO THAT'S THAT. I'm sorry darling perhaps it's for the best. No more politics. No more Belfast politics. Oh bliss." Hyde did make efforts to have the decision overturned by Unionist Party headquarters on procedural grounds but he had no high-level political support.

Although he had made little secret of his progressive views during the capital punishment debates, the campaign for access to the Roger Casement diaries, and his writings on Oscar Wilde, Hyde's political undoings were his parliamentary interventions and outspoken views on the decriminalisation of homosexuality.

He contributed a half-hour speech to that 1958 debate covering both aspects of the Wolfenden report. He concluded by demanding equality for the homosexual and the prostitute. Earlier he quoted a letter from a consenting adult who had been jailed and released, only to be informed on again, losing his new job. He pointed out "three popular fallacies that have been exposed by the Report": that "male homosexuality always involves sodomy", that homosexuals are "necessarily effeminate", and that most relevant court cases "are of practising male homosexuals in private". Only one hundred men a year, he said, were convicted of sex in private with consenting adults. Hyde's reform efforts at decriminalising homosexuality in England and Wales were not to be successful for another ten years. It took 25 years, until 1982, for the same to happen in Northern Ireland.

In later life, he became somewhat disillusioned with the cause of Irish Unionism. He famously moved a motion in Westminster calling for a tunnel to be constructed between County Antrim and the Scottish coast. He spent 40 minutes outlining its advantages. Echoing Jules Verne, he pronounced: "The dreams of yesterday are the realities of today".

In 1970, Hyde wrote the first social history of homosexuality in Great Britain and Ireland, The Other Love, perhaps his most memorable and long-lasting work. With its rich and detailed narratives, "fusing legal knowledge with illustrative anecdotage", it was the most extensive book to date on the subject. Antony Grey, secretary of the Homosexual Law Reform Society (HLRS) provided case histories and cuttings from the society's files for its contemporary section.

== Academia ==
He was an extension lecturer in history at the University of Oxford in 1934, and professor of history and political science at the University of Punjab from 1959 to 1962.

He also wrote a number of biographies of legal and political figures and books on spying, notably Room 3603 (1963) about Sir William Stephenson and the wartime efforts of British Security Coordination. He also wrote a biography of the Allied wartime spy Betty Thorpe with the British Security Coordination code name "Cynthia". Hyde also wrote extensively about the Oscar Wilde trials and Wilde's immediate circle, the trial of Sir Roger Casement, and about T. E. Lawrence.

His involvement in progressive and controversial issues did not cease after he left parliament. He continued his work opposing capital punishment while he published two articles in May 1965 in the Sunday People to advance the cause of homosexual law reform. The second entitled "The Million Women", appeared after the House of Commons had rejected Leo Abse's first Bill, showing "itself more reactionary than the Lords", as he stated. That article dealt with lesbians whose "association" was not regarded as an offence, and "Sappho the poetess who wrote passionate verses about the lovely maidens who gathered round her."

Hyde was awarded an honorary degree by Queen's University Belfast in 1984. He lived at Westwell House, Tenterden, in Kent, in a house once inhabited by Horatio Nelson's daughter. Hyde was earlier a tenant of Lamb House in Rye, once home to his distant cousin, Henry James. He worked up until his death on 10 August 1989, just short of his eighty-second birthday. His third wife, Rosalind, survived him. Many of his papers are in the Public Record Office of Northern Ireland (PRONI). Others were sold to the University of Texas at Austin.

== Selected works ==
- The Rise of Castlereagh, (Macmillan, 1933)
- The Russian Journals of Martha and Catherine Wilmot, co-editor with Marchioness of Londonderry (Macmillan, 1934)
- More Letters from Martha Wilmot. Impressions of Vienna 1819-1829, co-editor with Marchioness of Londonderry (Macmillan, 1935)
- The Empress Catherine and Princess Dashkov, (Chapman & Hall, 1935)
- Air Defence and the Civil Population, co-author with G. F. Falkiner Nuttall (Cresset Press, 1937)
- Londonderry House and Pictures, (Cresset Press, 1937)
- Princess Lieven, (Harrap, 1938)
- Judge Jeffreys, (Harrap, 1940); 2nd ed. (Butterworth & Co., 1948)
- Mexican Empire: The History of Maximilian and Carlota of Mexico, (Macmillan, 1946)
- A Victorian Historian: Private Letters of W. E. H. Lecky, 1859-1878, (Home & Van Thal, 1947)
- Privacy and the Press: The Daily Mirror Press Photographer Libel Action, (Butterworth, 1947)
- John Law: The History of an Honest Adventurer, (Home & Van Thal, 1948); 2nd revised ed. (W. H. Allen, 1969)
- Trials of Oscar Wilde, "Notable British Trials" series (Hodge & Co., 1948); enlarged ed. (Penguin, 1962)
- Mr and Mrs Beeton, (Harrap, 1951)
- Cases that Changed the Law, (Heinemann, 1951)
- Carson: The Life of Sir Edward Carson, Lord Carson of Duncairn, (Heinemann, 1953)
- Trial of Christopher Craig and Derek William Bentley, "Notable British Trials" series (Hodge & Co., 1954)
- United in Crime, (Heinemann, 1955)
- The Strange Death of Lord Castlereagh, (Heinemann, 1959)
- Trial of Sir Roger Casement, "Notable British Trials" series (Hodge & Co., 1960)
- Sir Patrick Hastings: His Life and Cases, (Heinemann, 1960)
- Recent Developments in Historical Method and Interpretation, (pub. Lahore, 1960)
- Simla and the Simla Hill under British Protection, 1815–1835, (pub. Lahore, 1961)
- An International Casebook of Crime, co-author with John H. Kisch (Barrie & Rockliff, 1962)
- The Quiet Canadian: The Secret Service Story of Sir William Stephenson, (Hamish Hamilton, 1962)
  - (US ed.) Room 3603: The Story of the British Intelligence Center in New York During World War II, (Farrar Straus & Co., 1963)
- Oscar Wilde: The Aftermath, (Methuen & Co., 1963)
- Norman Birkett: The Life of Lord Birkett of Ulverston, (Hamish Hamilton, 1964)
- A History of Pornography, (Heinemann, 1964)
- Cynthia: The Story of the Spy Who Changed the Course of the War, (Hamish Hamilton, 1966)
- The Story of Lamb House, Rye: The Home of Henry James, (Adams of Rye, 1966)
- Lord Reading: The Life of Rufus Isaacs, First Marquess of Reading, (Heinemann, 1967)
- Strong for Service: The Life of Lord Nathan of Churt, (W. H. Allen, 1968)
- Henry James at Home, (Methuen, 1969)
- The Other Love: An Historical and Contemporary Survey of Homosexuality in Britain, (Heinemann, 1970)
  - (US ed.) The Love That Dared Not Speak its Name: A Candid History of Homosexuality in Britain, (Little, Brown & Co., 1970)
- Their Good Names: Twelve Cases of Libel and Slander, (Hamish Hamilton, 1970)
- Stalin: The History of a Dictator, (Hart-Davis, 1971)
- Baldwin: The Unexpected Prime Minister, (Hart-Davis MacGibbon, 1973)
- Oscar Wilde, (Farrar, Straus & Giroux, 1975); UK ed. (Eyre & Methuen, 1976)
- Neville Chamberlain, (Weidenfeld & Nicolson, 1976)
- The Cleveland Street Scandal, (W. H. Allen, 1976)
- Crime Has its Heroes: Twenty Famous Trials, (Constable, 1976)
- Solitary in the Ranks: Lawrence of Arabia as Airman and Private Soldier, (Constable, 1977); US ed. (Atheneum, 1978)
- The Londonderrys: A Family Portrait, (Hamish Hamilton, 1979)
- The Atom Bomb Spies, (Hamish Hamilton, 1980)
- Secret Intelligence Agent, (Constable, 1982)
  - (US ed.) Secret Intelligence Agent: British Espionage in America and the Creation of the OSS, (St. Martin's Press, 1983)
- Lord Alfred Douglas, (Methuen, 1984)
- George Blake: Superspy, (Constable, 1987)
- Walter Monckton, (Sinclair-Stevenson, 1991)

Parliament of the United Kingdom
Preceded by William Frederick Neill	Member of Parliament for Belfast North; 1950–1959	Succeeded by Stratton Mills
