= Thomas McConnell =

Northern Irish politician (1868–1938)

Sir Thomas Edward McConnell (7 April 1868 – 22 May 1938) was a unionist politician in Northern Ireland.

McConnell studied at the Royal Belfast Academical Institution before becoming the managing director of a horse and cattle sales firm. He was elected to the Belfast Corporation as a councillor and then an alderman, for the Ulster Unionist Party. He was also successful at the 1921 Belfast Duncairn by-election, and when his seat was abolished the next year, he won Belfast North, for which he sat until 1929.

Parliament of the United Kingdom
Preceded by Edward Carson	Member of Parliament for Belfast Duncairn; 1921–1922	Constituency abolished
New constituency	Member of Parliament for Belfast North; 1922–1929	Succeeded by Thomas Somerset
Civic offices
Preceded by George Ruddell Black	High Sheriff of Belfast; 1936–1937	Succeeded by Thomas Loftus Cole
