= William Leeburn =

William John Leeburn (1895 – 7 September 1975) was a trade unionist and politician from Northern Ireland.

== Life ==
Born in Carnmoney, Leeburn came to prominence in the Northern Ireland Labour Party (NILP). He was elected to Belfast Corporation, and served as the NILP chairman for 1945. He stood unsuccessfully in Belfast North at the 1945 and 1950 Westminster general elections, where he took 44.7% and then 35.6% of the votes cast. He also stood for the Parliament of Northern Ireland in South Tyrone at a 1945 by-election, where he took 18.1% of the vote, and at the 1949 Northern Ireland general election in Belfast Willowfield, taking second place but only 12.5% of the vote. He was broadly supportive of the partition of Ireland, and argued that the NILP should become a regional council of the British Labour Party.

Leeburn was also active in the Amalgamated Transport and General Workers Union (ATGWU), becoming its district organiser for Northern Ireland in 1936. In 1953, he was elected to the executive of the Irish Trades Union Congress (ITUC), serving for three years. In 1956, he was chosen as the ITUC's first Northern Ireland Officer, acting as full-time secretary of its Northern Ireland Committee. He held this post until 1960, when he retired. He also drew up the draft constitution for the Irish Congress of Trade Unions, which brought the ITUC together with the rival Congress of Irish Unions.

Trade union offices
Preceded by John Kerr as Secretary of the Northern Ireland Committee	Northern Ireland Officer of the Irish Trades Union Congress; 1956–1960	Succeeded by Billy Blease
