= Sir William Ewart, 1st Baronet =

Irish linen manufacturer and Unionist politician

The Right Honourable Sir William Ewart, 1st Baronet
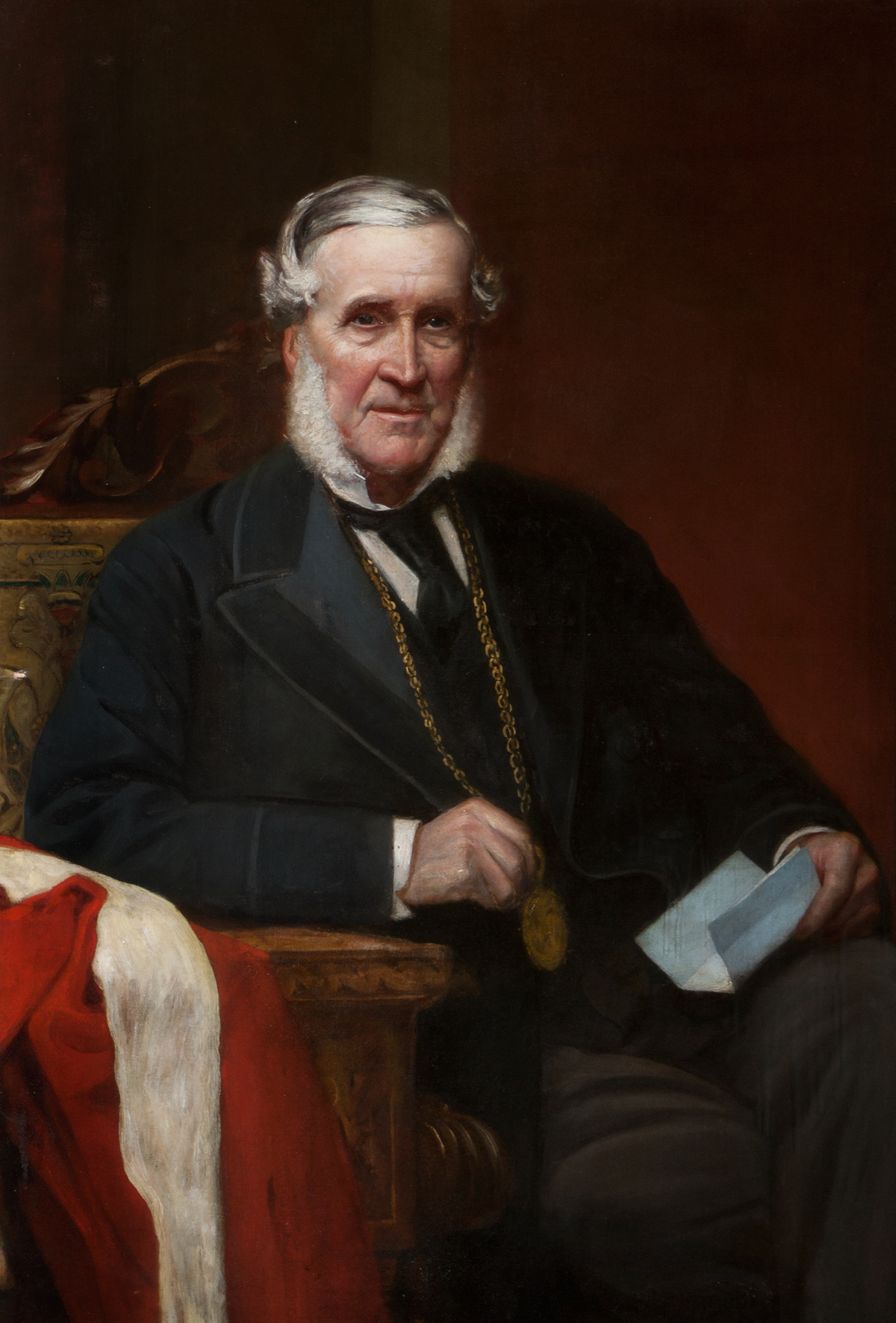
- Sir William Ewart, 1st Baronet

Member of Parliament for Belfast
- In office 1878–1885

Member of Parliament for Belfast North
- In office 1885–1889
- Succeeded by: Sir Edward Harland, Bt

Mayor of Belfast
- In office 1859–1861
- Preceded by: Samuel Gibson Getty
- Succeeded by: Edward Coey

Personal details
- Born: 22 November 1817 Sydenham, County Down, Ireland
- Died: 1 August 1889 (aged 71) Piccadilly, London, England
- Party: Conservative
- Education: Belfast Royal Academy
- Occupation: Linen manufacturer/merchant, magistrate and Politician

Sir William Ewart, 1st Baronet (22 November 1817 – 1 August 1889) was an Irish linen manufacturer and Unionist politician who sat in the House of Commons from 1878 to 1889.

Ewart was the son of William Ewart of Sydenham Park, County Down. He was educated at the Belfast Academy. He was a linen manufacturer and merchant and became president of the Irish Linen Trade Association. In 1859 he was Mayor of Belfast and was also some time a member of the Belfast Local Marine Board. He was a magistrate for Antrim and Belfast.

Ewart was Member of Parliament (MP) for Belfast from 1878 until the constituency was divided under the Redistribution of Seats Act 1885, and then for the Northern Division of Belfast until his death, at which point Sir Edward Harland, Bt. was elected unopposed. Ewart was created a baronet on 13 September 1887, of Glenmachan House, in the parish of Holywood in the County of Down and of Glenbank, in the parish of Belfast in the County of Antrim.

He was one of the Directors of the XIT Ranch, located in the Texas Panhandle.

Ewart married Isabella Kelso Mathewson daughter of Lavens Mathewson of Newtownstewart, County Tyrone.

Ewart died on 1 August 1889 at 14 Albemarle Street in the Piccadilly area of London, and was buried in Belfast days later.

Civic offices
| Preceded by Samuel Gibson Getty | Mayor of Belfast; 1859 – 1860 | Succeeded by Edward Coey |
Parliament of the United Kingdom
| Preceded by James Porter Corry and William Johnston | Member of Parliament for Belfast; 1878–1885; With: James Porter Corry | Constituency abolished |
| New constituency | Member of Parliament for Belfast North; 1885–1889 | Succeeded by Edward James Harland |
Baronetage of the United Kingdom
| New creation | Baronet (of Glenmachan, Down); 1887–1889 | Succeeded by William Quartus Ewart |
