= Edward Harland =

English shipbuilder and politician (1831–1895)

Sir Edward J. Harland Bt
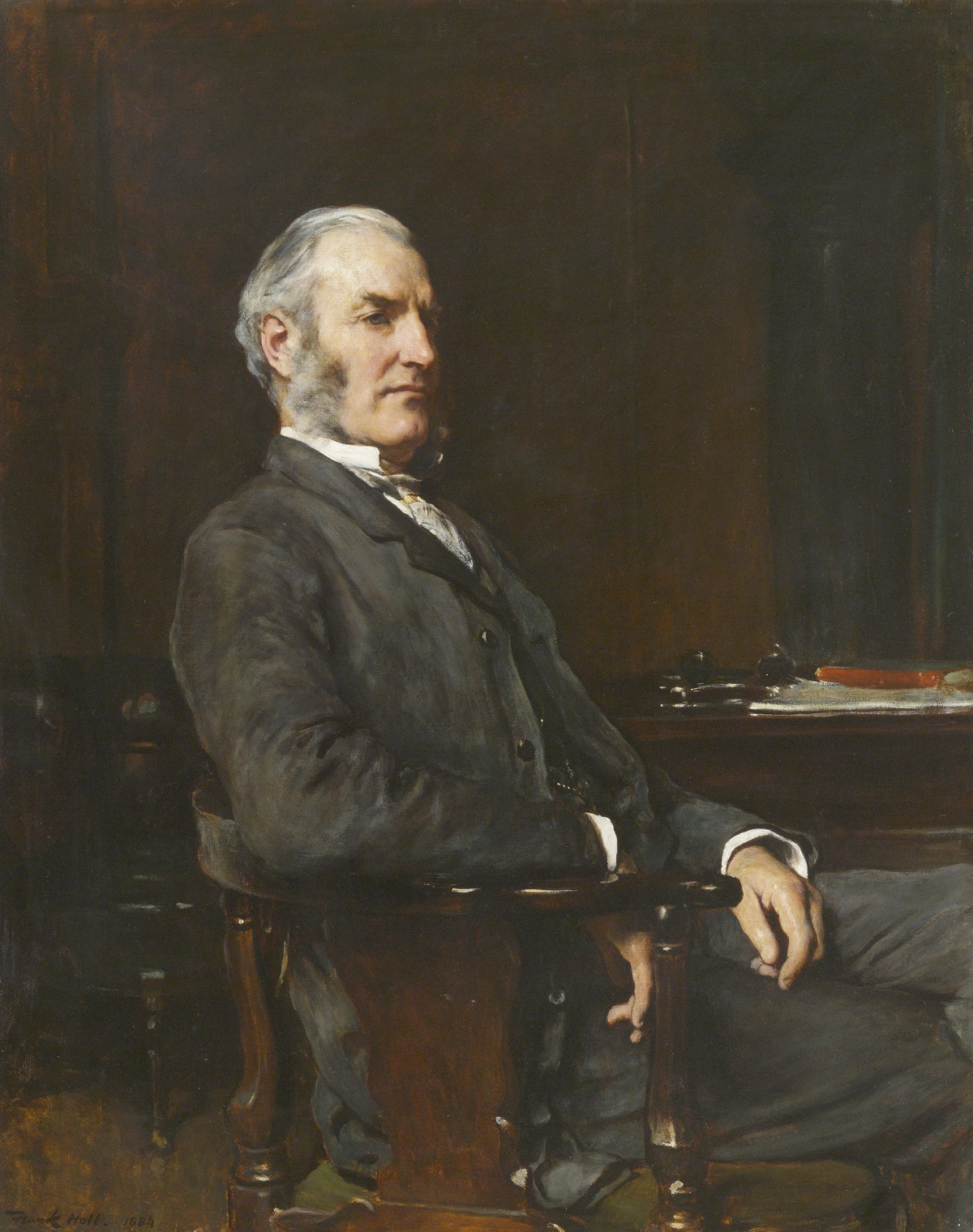
- Portrait by Frank Holl (1884)
- Born: Edward James Harland; 15 May 1831; Scarborough, North Riding of Yorkshire, England
- Died: 24 December 1895 (aged 64); Glenfarne Hall, Glenfarne, County Leitrim, Ireland
- Resting place: Belfast City Cemetery; 54.59°N 5.98°W
- Education: Edinburgh Academy
- Occupations: Shipbuilder, businessman, politician
- Known for: Co-founder of Harland and Wolff
- Title: Baronet, Knight Bachelor
- Political party: Conservative and Unionist Party
- Spouse: Rosa Matilda Wann (1860-death)

Sir Edward James Harland, 1st Baronet (15 May 1831 – 24 December 1895), was an English shipbuilder and politician. Born in Scarborough in the North Riding of Yorkshire, he was educated at Edinburgh Academy. In 1846, aged 15, he took an apprenticeship at the engineering works of Robert Stephenson and Company in Newcastle upon Tyne. Afterwards he was employed in jobs in Glasgow and again in Newcastle, before moving to Belfast in 1854 to manage Robert Hickson's shipyard at Queen's Island. Four years later he bought the yard and renamed the business Edward James Harland and Company. In 1861 he formed a business partnership with Gustav Wilhelm Wolff, his former personal assistant, creating Harland and Wolff. Later, Harland recruited William James Pirrie as another partner. Edward Harland, Gustav Wolff and William James Pirrie maintained a successful business, receiving regular orders from the White Star Line, before Harland's retirement in 1889, leaving Wolff and Pirrie to manage the shipyard.

Outside his company, Harland served as a Belfast harbour commissioner. In 1885, Harland was granted a knighthood and a baronetcy. Harland was a member of the Conservative and Unionist Party, and served as Mayor of Belfast; later he moved to London and served as Member of Parliament for Belfast North until his death.

== Early life ==
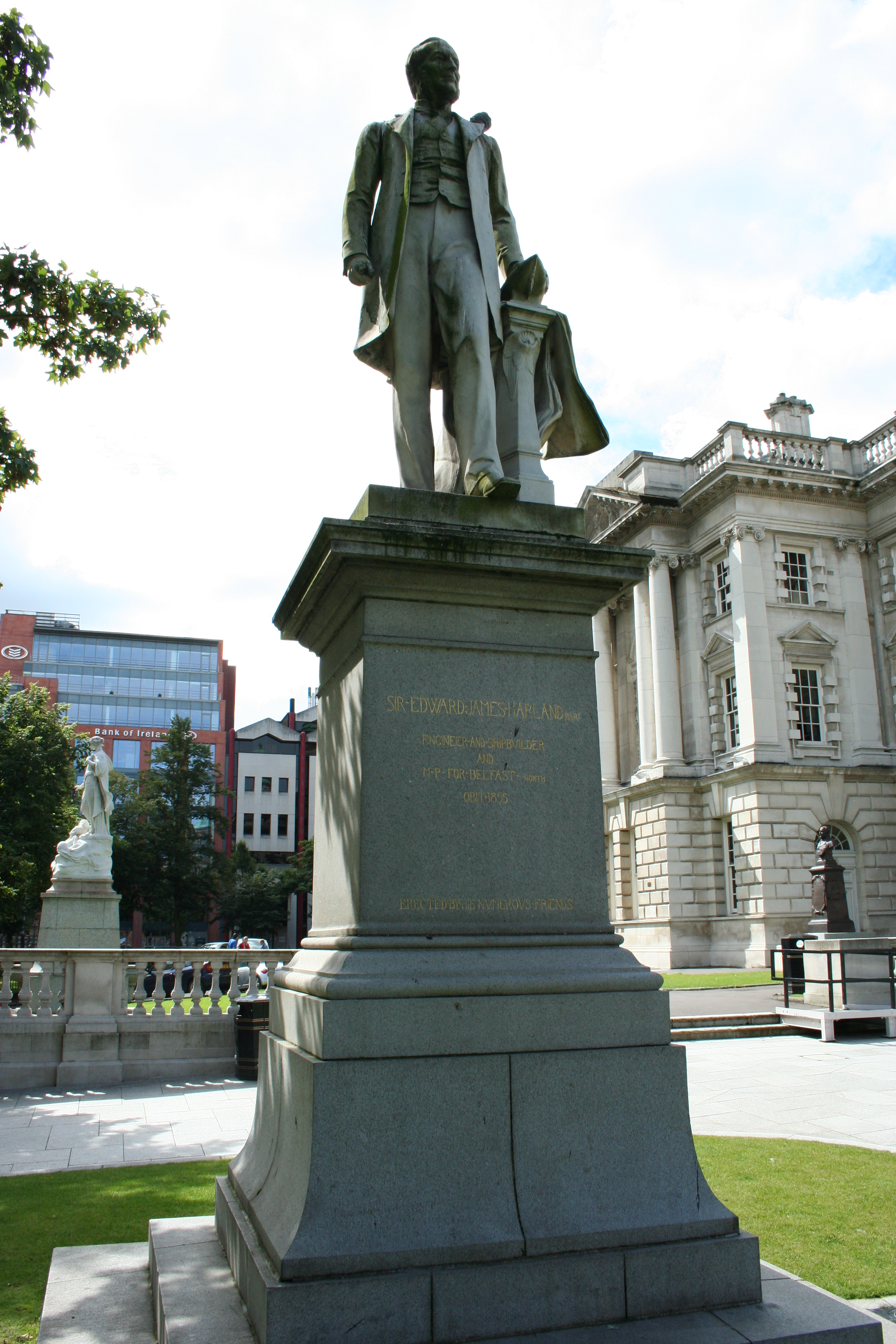
Statue of Sir Edward Harland in the grounds of City Hall, Belfast

Edward James Harland was born on 15 May 1831 in Newborough, a neighbourhood within Scarborough in what was then the North Riding of Yorkshire, to Dr. William Harland and his wife Anne, the daughter of Gowan Pierson who was from Goathland, Yorkshire. Harland's birthplace is now the site of a Marks & Spencer store. Edward was the seventh child of ten, and the fourth boy of six. His antecedent brother died as an infant; Edward Harland is described as the sixth child in the family by alternative sources. Dr. Harland was a physician and an amateur engineer; he invented a patented steam-powered carriage in 1827.

=== Early career ===
Edward Harland was educated at Edinburgh Academy. In 1846, aged 15, he went to Newcastle upon Tyne to serve an apprenticeship at Robert Stephenson and Company, an engineering works. The owner, Robert Stephenson, was the son of George Stephenson, the locomotive engineer, of whom Edward Harland's father was a friend. Harland served as an apprentice in Newcastle until 1851. During the apprenticeship, Harland met Gustav Christian Schwabe, who knew Dr. Thomas Harland, Edward's uncle; Schwabe was a partner in John Bibby & Sons, a shipping company based in Liverpool. Schwabe arranged for Harland to be employed at J. and G. Thomson marine engineers in Glasgow, who were shipbuilding for John Bibby, after he completed his apprenticeship. Here, Harland earned 20 shillings a week and became head draughtsman. In 1853, Harland left Glasgow to return to Newcastle, as the manager of the Thomas Toward shipyard on the Tyne.

=== Robert Hickson and Company ===
In December 1854, Harland moved to Belfast with Schwabe's encouragement, and was employed as manager of Robert Hickson's shipyard in Queen's Island. Here, Harland became known for strict management and improving workmanship, by cutting wages and banning smoking; he also carried a piece of chalk and an ivory ruler, used for marking mistakes. An employee at Harland's later venture, Harland and Wolff, stated:

He had an all-smelling nose as well as an all-seeing eye. One day he was walking rapidly along, and he suddenly stopped dead and sniffed at a saw-pit. In a flash the trapdoor was lifted and there squatting in the sawdust was a wizened little man, puffing at clay pipe

— An employee at Harland and Wolff,

Harland was able to keep the shipyard running despite the owner's financial problems. In 1857, Harland employed Gustav Wilhelm Wolff, Gustav Schwabe's nephew, as his personal assistant. Harland began attempting to open his own shipbuilding business, and was unsuccessful with several applications to open yards in Liverpool. But on 21 September 1858, Robert Hickson wrote to him:

I offer you my interest and goodwill in the shipyard at the Queen's Island, Belfast...for the sum of five thousand pounds...

— Robert Hickson,

With the financial assistance of Gustav Schwabe, Harland purchased the business and on 1 November 1858, Edward James Harland and Company was created.

== Founding of Harland and Wolff ==
Edward Harland's new company quickly attracted an order of three boats from John Bibby & Sons. These boats were named Venetian, Sicilian and Syrian; the current company's order book still has the three boats listed as No. 1, No. 2 and No. 3. Impressed with the boats, Bibby ordered six more boats from Harland in 1860. The boats that Edward Harland designed were long, had a narrow beam and were flat-bottomed; the boats became known as "Bibby's coffins". On 26 January 1860, Harland married Rosa Matilda Wann, of Vermont, Belfast, who was the daughter of Thomas Wann, a stockbroker and insurance agent. In 1861, Harland chose the 27-year-old Gustav Wilhelm Wolff, his former personal assistant, to become a partner in the firm, forming Harland and Wolff. Harland's company had a prosperous relationship with Thomas Henry Ismay's White Star Line, a prominent shipping company, ensuring regular orders and financial success. Harland's designing skills created ships with flatter bottoms and squarer bilges to increase capacity. According to Edward Harland's obituary in The Times, he designed his company's ocean liners "on the model of a fish swimming through the water." Harland's company received orders during the American Civil War from the Confederate States of America, who bought fast steamers to evade the Union blockade. In 1874 Edward Harland recruited William James Pirrie, a former apprentice at the company as a partner; Pirrie later became chairman of the company, and was given the task of finding buyers and negotiating deals. Harland was once asked the nature of the three men's business relationship and replied:

Well, Wolff designs the ships, Pirrie sells them and I smoke the firm's cigars.

— Edward Harland,

Harland applied for several patents including, in 1860 for "improvements in constructing and covering the decks of ships and other floating bodies", in 1871 for "improvements in apparatus for propelling vessels", in 1878 for "improvements in screw-propellers." In 1880 Harland and his two partners decided to expand further and built their own engine works. Harland began having less involvement in the running of the shipyard, and in 1889 he retired from daily involvement in the business.

== Political career and later life ==
Edward Harland served as the Chief Belfast Harbour Commissioner from 1875 until the 1880s. Harland was a Presbyterian and a member of the Church in Rosemary Street, Belfast. As a member of the Conservative and Unionist Party, he served as Mayor of Belfast in 1885 and 1886, and strongly opposed the 1886 Home Rule Bill. In 1885, Harland was granted a knighthood and on 25 July the same year, he was granted a baronetcy. In 1889 Harland was elected to serve as the Member of Parliament for Belfast North. He was appointed to a Royal Commission on industrial disputes in 1891. Harland then moved to London, and was re-elected unopposed twice in 1892 and 1895 and served as MP for the constituency until his death, on Christmas Eve 1895, at his Irish home, Glenfarne Hall in Glenfarne, County Leitrim. Harland left no heir to his baronetcy.

He was the great-uncle of Air Marshal Sir Reginald Harland.

== Notes ==
Civic offices
Preceded by David Taylor	Mayor of Belfast; 1885–1886	Succeeded by James Horner Haslett
Parliament of the United Kingdom
Preceded by Sir William Ewart, Bt	Member of Parliament for Belfast North; 1889–1895	Succeeded by James Horner Haslett
Baronetage of the United Kingdom
New creation	Baronet (of Ormiston and Brompton); 1885–1895	Extinct
Preceded by Vernon baronets	Harland baronets of Ormiston and Brompton; 25 July 1885	Succeeded by Fowler baronets
