= Belfast Duncairn (UK Parliament constituency) =

UK parliamentary constituency in Ireland, 1918–1922

- Former borough constituency for the House of Commons
- Borough: Belfast

1918–1922
- Seats: 1
- Created from: Belfast North
- Replaced by: Belfast North

Duncairn, a division of the parliamentary borough of Belfast, was a UK parliamentary constituency in Ireland. It returned one Member of Parliament (MP) to the House of Commons of the United Kingdom from 1918 to 1922, using the first past the post electoral system.

== History ==
Under the Redistribution of Seats Act 1885, the parliamentary borough of Belfast had been divided into four divisions: Belfast East, Belfast North, Belfast South and Belfast West. A Report of the Boundary Commission recommended extending the parliamentary borough to include the whole of the county borough as had been defined under the Local Government (Ireland) Act 1898, with an increase to nine divisions.

For the division of Duncairn, it recommended a definition of:

the Duncairn ward and the north-eastern part of the then Clifton ward of Belfast Corporation lying north and east of a line commencing at a point in the western boundary of the ward opposite the middle of Old Park Road proceeding along the middle of Old Park Road to its junction with Mountview Street, then along the middle of Mountview Street to its junction with Manor Street, then northwards along the middle of Manor Street to its junction with Cliftonville Road, then south-eastwards along the middle of Cliftonville Road to the ward boundary in Duncairn Street.

This was adopted under the Redistribution of Seats (Ireland) Act 1918. The area had previously been in the Belfast North constituency. It was in use at the 1918 general election only. Under the Government of Ireland Act 1920 its area was again part of the Belfast North constituency, with effect at the 1922 general election.

== Politics ==
The constituency was a strongly unionist area. Carson was the Unionist leader in the House of Commons. His chief opponent was Major William Hamilton Davey, recently returned from France following the armistice. A barrister in civilian life, Major Davey stood for Home Rule and retained his deposit. During the course of the campaign Carson mistakenly referred to Major Davey as a 'Sinn Féiner' which led to damages being awarded to Major Davey in his subsequent action for slander.

== First Dáil ==
After the 1918 election, Sinn Féin invited all those elected for constituencies in Ireland to sit as TDs in Dáil Éireann rather than in the House of Commons of the United Kingdom. All those elected for Irish constituencies were included in the roll of the Dáil but only those elected for Sinn Féin sat in the First Dáil. In May 1921, the Dáil passed a resolution declaring that elections to the House of Commons of Northern Ireland and the House of Commons of Southern Ireland would be used as the election for the Second Dáil and that the First Dáil would be dissolved on the assembly of the new body. The area of Belfast Duncairn would then have been represented in the Dáil by the four-seat constituency of Belfast North, which also returned no representatives for Sinn Féin.

== Members of Parliament ==
Election	MP	Party
1918	Rt. Hon. Sir Edward Carson	Irish Unionist
1921 (b)	Thomas McConnell	UUP
1922	Constituency abolished	

== Elections ==
General Election 14 December 1918: Belfast Duncairn
Party	Candidate	Votes	%	±%
Irish Unionist	Rt Hon Sir Edward Henry Carson	11,637	81.05	
Irish Nationalist	William Hamilton Davey	2,449	17.06	
Sinn Féin	Dr Russell McNab	271	1.89	
Majority		9,188	63.99	
Turnout		19,085	75.23	
Irish Unionist win (new seat)				

- Carson appointed a Lord of Appeal in Ordinary and created Baron Carson

By-Election 23 June 1921: Belfast Duncairn
Party	Candidate	Votes	%	±%
UUP	Thomas McConnell	Unopposed	N/A	N/A
UUP hold				

== See also ==
- List of UK Parliament Constituencies in Ireland and Northern Ireland
- List of MPs elected in the 1918 United Kingdom general election
- Historic Dáil constituencies
