= Cecil Walker =

Northern Irish politician (1924–2007)

Sir Cecil Walker

Member of Parliament for Belfast North
- In office 9 June 1983 – 14 May 2001
- Preceded by: John McQuade
- Succeeded by: Nigel Dodds

Personal details
- Born: 17 December 1924 Belfast, Northern Ireland
- Died: 3 January 2007 (aged 82) Newtownabbey, Northern Ireland, UK
- Party: Ulster Unionist Party
- Occupation: Activist; politician (Member of Parliament for North Belfast (1983–2001)

Sir Alfred Cecil Walker (17 December 1924 – 3 January 2007) was an Ulster Unionist Party (UUP) politician, who was the Member of Parliament (MP) for North Belfast from 1983 to 2001.

== Biography ==
Walker was born in Belfast. His father was a police constable. He was educated at Everton Elementary School, Model Boys' School, and Belfast Methodist College. He worked for the Belfast timber trader James P. Corry after leaving school in 1941 until he was elected to Parliament in 1983. He married Ann Verrant in 1953. They had two sons.

He became actively involved in Unionist politics in the 1970s, was an unsuccessful pro-White Paper Unionist candidate at the election to the 1973 Northern Ireland Assembly and was elected to Belfast City Council in 1977. He contested the Belfast North constituency in the 1979 general election, narrowly losing to John McQuade of the Democratic Unionist Party. He won the seat 4 years later, in the 1983 general election, after McQuade retired. He was one of the MPs with the lowest attendance rate at Westminster.

Along with all other Unionist MPs, he resigned his seat in December 1985 in protest at the Anglo-Irish Agreement. He was re-elected at a by-election in January 1986. In 1988, he advocated internment of Provisional Irish Republican Army (IRA) suspects to stem a series of murders, but also argued for the internment of suspects connected with the Ulster Defence Association and the Ulster Volunteer Force. In 1998, he was one of only two UUP MPs to support the Good Friday Agreement without reservation, and he backed UUP leader David Trimble until the end of Trimble's own political career in 2005.

However, he lost his own seat to Nigel Dodds of the DUP in the 2001 general election, following a disastrous televised debate at Crumlin Road Courthouse in his constituency, in which he stumbled over some of the most rudimentary questions. His vote declined from 21,000 to 4,000, his 13,000 majority was transformed into a 6,000 majority for the DUP and he was beaten into fourth place behind Sinn Féin and the Social Democratic and Labour Party (SDLP) - although this was also partly because there had been no DUP candidate in the previous general election.

He was noted for the moderation of his Unionist views, which contrasted with the deep sectarian divisions in his constituency. He said he would have no objection to amending the Act of Settlement 1701 to allow the heir to the throne to marry a Roman Catholic, and caused controversy in 2001 by saying that a united Ireland in 30 years time may not be a bad thing, though he later said that was a "throwaway line that has been taken out of context". He was created a Knight Bachelor in the Queen's Birthday Honours in June 2002.

== Death ==
He lived in Glengormley, in County Antrim, and died of a heart attack in Newtownabbey. He was survived by his wife and their two sons.

Parliament of the United Kingdom
Preceded by John McQuade	Member of Parliament for Belfast North; 1983 – 2001	Succeeded by Nigel Dodds
