= RMS Pretoria Castle =

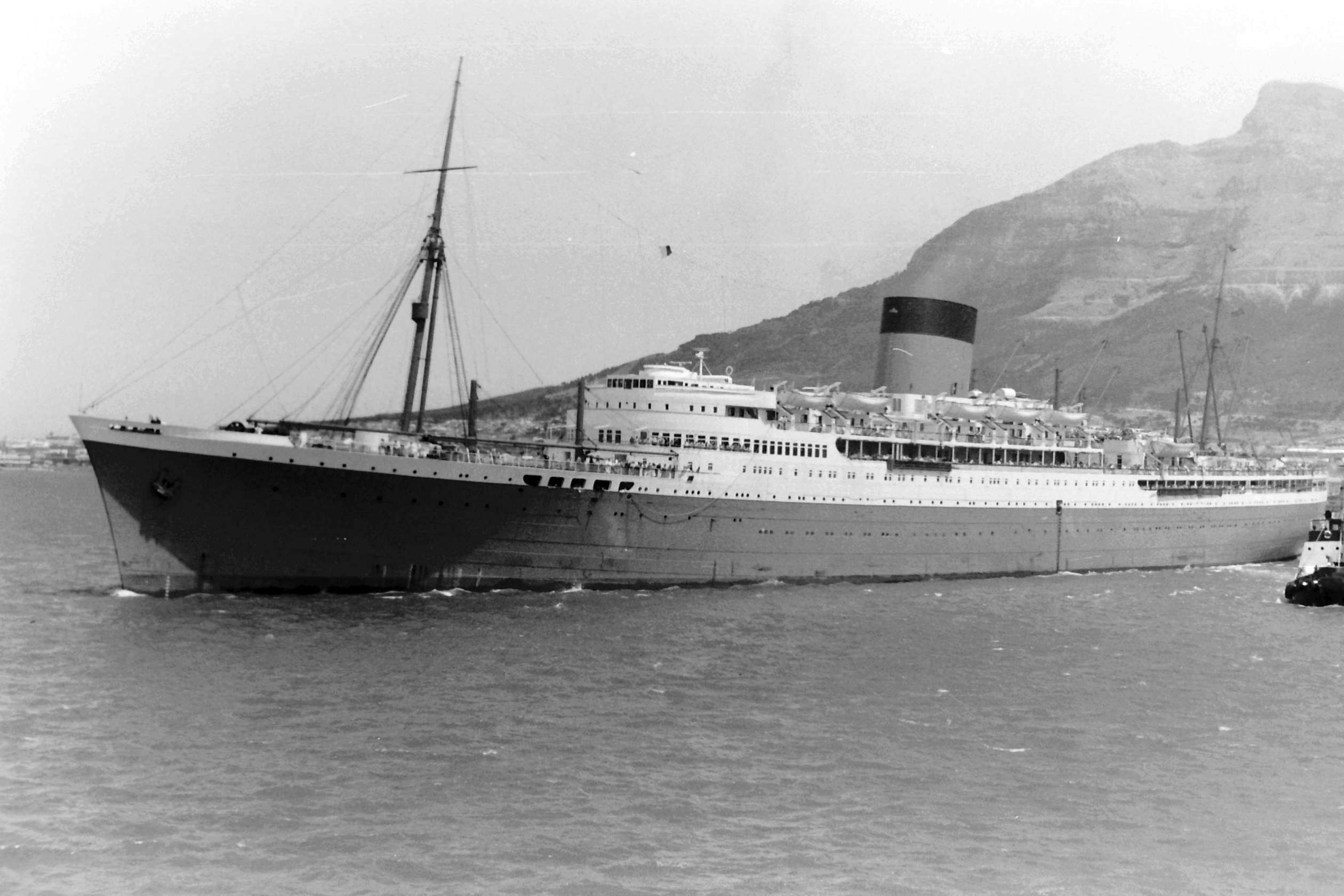
- Pretoria Castle in Cape Town in 1953

History

United Kingdom
- Name: Pretoria Castle (1947–1966); S.A. Oranje (1966–1969)
- Owner: Union-Castle Line (1947–1966); Safmarine (1966–1969)
- Operator: Union-Castle Line (1947–1969)
- Builder: Harland & Wolff, Belfast, Northern Ireland
- Launched: 19 August 1947
- Completed: 10 July 1948
- Maiden voyage: July 1948
- Renamed: 1966
- Fate: Sold

South Africa
- Name: S.A. Oranje
- Owner: Safmarine (1969–1975)
- Operator: Safmarine (1969–1975)
- Fate: Scrapped 2 November 1975

General characteristics
- Tonnage: 28,705 GRT
- Length: 747 ft (228 m)
- Beam: 74 ft (23 m)
- Propulsion: Steam turbines
- Speed: 22 knots (41 km/h) (service speed)
- Capacity: 755
- Crew: 400

Pretoria Castle (later S.A. Oranje) was an ocean liner operated by the Union-Castle Line in service between Britain and South Africa during the mid 20th century.

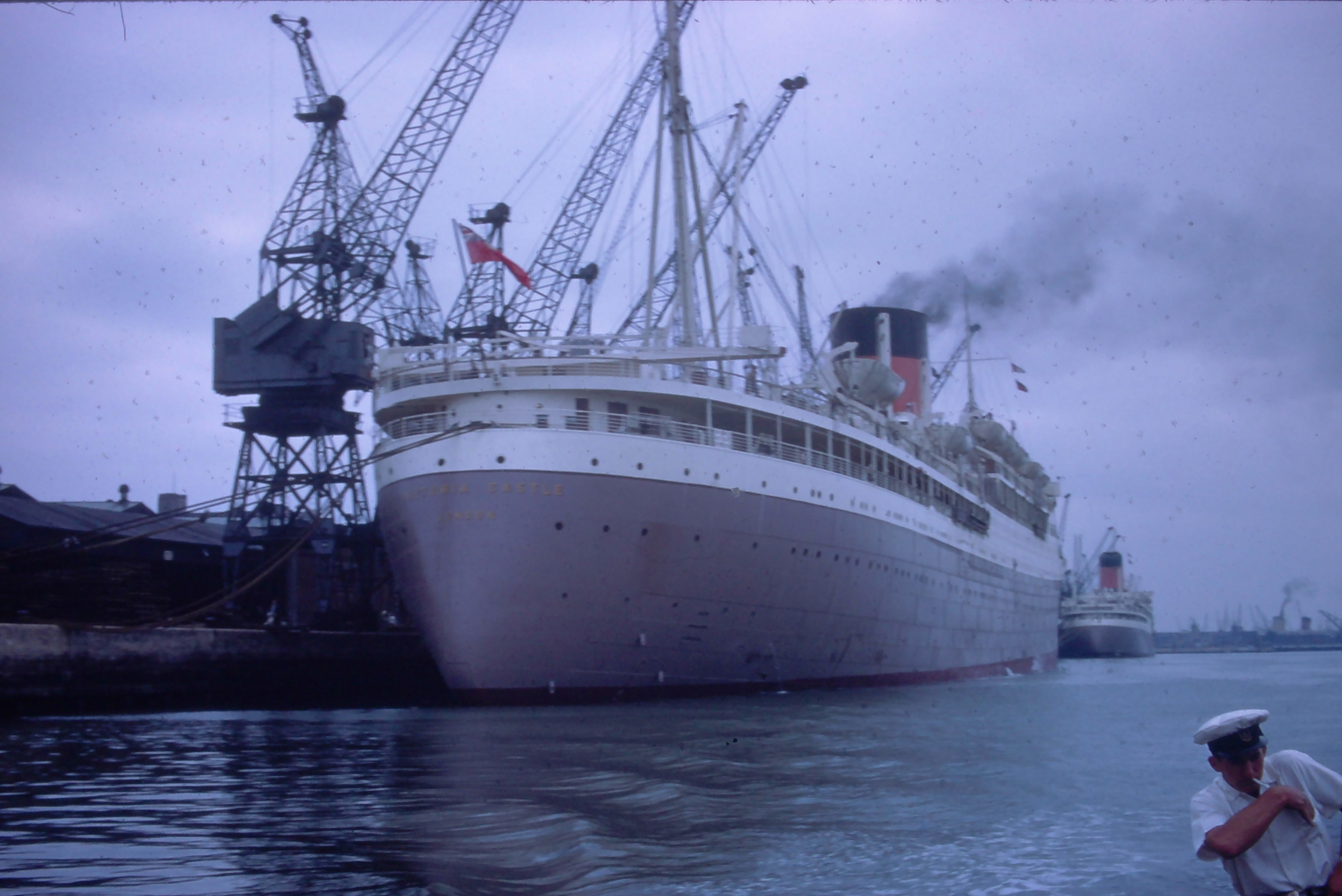
Pretoria Castle, Southampton 1958

She was built by Harland & Wolff of Belfast at a cost of £2.5 million, and was launched on 19 August 1947, with her christening performed by the wife of South African Prime Minister Jan Smuts. She made her maiden voyage in July 1948. In 1953, she was present for the fleet review as part of the Coronation of Elizabeth II. She was refit twice in the mid-1960s, with modifications externally to her masts and internally with the addition of air conditioning and added private bathrooms. In January 1966, she was sold to South African shipping company Safmarine via its British subsidiary and renamed S.A. Oranje, though she continued in Union Castle service and was manned by that company's crew until 1969, when Safmarine took full control and she was registered in South Africa. She made her last revenue run in September 1975 after fuel oil prices rose sharply in the preceding years, and sailed for scrapping in Taiwan in November.

Pretoria Castle measured 28,705 gross register tons, and was 747 feet (228 m) long with a beam of 84 feet (26 m). She was powered by steam turbines, which drove twin propellers that gave her a service speed of 22 knots (25 mph). She had a passenger capacity of 755—214 in first class and 541 in tourist class—and a crew of 400.
