= Stratton Mills =

British politician (born 1932)

Stratton MIlls

Member of Parliament for Belfast North
- In office 8 October 1959 – 8 February 1974
- Preceded by: H. Montgomery Hyde
- Succeeded by: John Carson

Personal details
- Born: 1 July 1932 (age 94)
- Party: Ulster Unionist (until 1972); Conservative (1972–1973); Alliance (1973–present)

William Stratton Mills (born 1 July 1932) is a retired solicitor and former politician in Northern Ireland.

Mills was the first Member of Parliament (MP) for the Alliance Party of Northern Ireland to sit in the British House of Commons, although he was first elected as a member of the Ulster Unionist Party (UUP).

== Life ==
Stratton Mills was educated at Campbell College, Belfast and Queen's University, Belfast. A solicitor by profession, Mills was elected as the Ulster Unionist Party (UUP) MP for Belfast North in the 1959 general election. He held his seat in subsequent elections, but in 1972 he refused to join the other UUP MPs in resigning the Conservative Party whip. He instead resigned from the UUP, describing himself as an independent Unionist and Conservative MP.

In August 1969, at the outset of The Troubles, Mills travelled with Robin Bailie to the United States to counter the fund raising efforts of Bernadette Devlin, and to promote the Unionist point of view to an American audience. Mills referred to Devlin as "a female Castro in a miniskirt" and questioned if the funds collected were to be used for Catholic relief or to further violence. Devlin responded that the $200,000 in contributions was to be administered by the Northern Ireland Civil Rights Association for the benefit of riot victims.

In December 1971, Mills derided the Republic of Ireland for being a safe haven for members of the Provisional Irish Republican Army. He stated that extradition requests for Dublin to turn over IRA members living in the Republic were ignored and on 22 occasions where British security forces came under fire from IRA members stationed at the nearby border of the Irish Republic and that Irish security forces sat by and took no action in stopping them. He also pointed out how IRA members operated freely in the Republic, including collecting money from local supporters, training camps, public meetings, and recruiting volunteers. He also pointed out how much of the gelignite used as explosives in detonating targets in Northern Ireland originated from the Republic:

[S]ome 60 percent of the gelignite used in Northern Ireland has come from Southern Ireland, and the security authorities believe that the figure might well be higher than that because of the difficulty of definite identification in all cases. In Northern Ireland steps are taken to control the use and distribution of gelignite. Certain steps have been taken recently in the South, but there is a great need for much tighter measures.

In 1973, Mills joined the Alliance Party of Northern Ireland. He retired from the House in 1974. He was also a partner in a firm of solicitors, and served on Northern Ireland's Historic Buildings Council. Mills is a member of the Ulster Architectural Heritage Society and the Irish Georgian Society. He lives in Malone Park, Belfast.

Following the death of Lord Morris of Aberavon on 5 June 2023, Mills became the last surviving former MP elected in the 1959 general election and the surviving former MP with the earliest date of first election.

== Sources ==
- Lords Hansard text for 3 Jul 1996 (160703-12)

Parliament of the United Kingdom
Preceded by H. Montgomery Hyde	Member of Parliament for Belfast North; 1959 – 1974	Succeeded by John Carson
