= Belfast North (UK Parliament constituency) =

Parliamentary constituency in the United Kingdom, 1885–1918 and since 1922

Coordinates: 54.663°N 5.965°W

- Borough constituency for the House of Commons
- Boundary of Belfast North in Northern Ireland
- District: Belfast; Antrim and Newtownabbey
- Population: 102,531 (2011 census)
- Electorate: 67,422 (March 2011)
- Borough: Belfast

Current constituency
- Created: 1922
- Member of Parliament: John Finucane (Sinn Féin)
- Seats: 1
- Created from: Belfast Duncairn; Belfast Shankill

1885–1918
- Seats: 1
- Type of constituency: Borough constituency
- Created from: Belfast
- Replaced by: Belfast Duncairn; Belfast Shankill

Belfast North is a parliamentary constituency in the United Kingdom House of Commons. The MP since 2019 is John Finucane (Sinn Féin).

Map of current boundaries

== History ==
Belfast North historically had a narrow unionist majority, which gradually decreased over time. The nationalist vote is considerable, and those from a Catholic background (47%) now slightly outnumber those from a Protestant background (46%), according to the 2011 census. It has generated particular interest for a number of highly unusual election results, as well as for several candidates and MPs prominently disagreeing with their parties.

Of the five main political parties in Northern Ireland, four (the Ulster Unionist Party, the Democratic Unionist Party, the Social Democratic and Labour Party, and Sinn Féin) all have relatively strong support bases and routinely poll similar results. Other parties such as the Alliance, Progressive Unionist Party, Unionist Party of Northern Ireland, Conservatives and the Workers' Party have at times polled significantly, as have independent candidates, with the result that many elections have been won on comparatively low shares of the vote. The elections to the various assemblies have often seen the seats for the constituency heavily split – in 1998 no party won more than one Assembly seat.

The area saw a steady out movement of Protestants during the Troubles, to some degree replaced by a growing Catholic population, although the overall population of the area fell sharply. However, all the inner-city communities in the constituency are now haemorrhaging electors, and the overall ethnic composition of the constituency now seems stable. The constituency suffered the highest level of violence in Northern Ireland during the Troubles and covers many areas synonymous with the conflict – the New Lodge, Ardoyne, Rathcoole, Ballysillan and Woodvale. The overall tenor of the constituency is working-class, with a high proportion of residents in public housing, and concentrations of low-income single people in the middle Antrim Road and Cliftonville areas. There are some upscale residential areas around Belfast Castle and on the slopes of Cavehill. Sectarian divisions are stark, with a number of Peace lines cutting through the constituency and occasional outbursts of sectarian street violence, and was the focus for post-ceasefire incidents such as the Holy Cross dispute.

The seat was consistently held by the Ulster Unionist Party from its creation until the 1970s. In 1972 the first notable dissent occurred when the sitting MP, Stratton Mills, dissented from the UUP's decision to withdraw from the Conservative whip at Westminster over the suspension of the Stormont Parliament. Mills remained as a Conservative MP, but the following year he joined the Alliance, giving them their only Westminster representation before 2010.

In the February 1974 general election the seat was won by John Carson of the Ulster Unionist Party with backing by the Vanguard Progressive Unionist Party and the Democratic Unionist Party on a united slate in opposition to the Sunningdale Agreement. Carson's victory came despite a majority of votes being cast for pro-Sunningdale candidates, albeit split between the Pro-Assembly Unionists, the Social Democratic and Labour Party and the Northern Ireland Labour Party. Carson held his seat in the October 1974 election but was deselected by the local Ulster Unionists over his support for the minority Labour government.

At the 1979 general election, John McQuade of the Democratic Unionist Party won the seat with a mere 27.6% of the vote – the third lowest total for a successful candidate in a UK general election in the twentieth century. This came about due to the strong showing of several other parties, dividing the vote strongly. McQuade also had the distinction of being the oldest person to be initially elected to Westminster in the 20th century. He did not stand at the next general election.

At the 1983 general election, Cecil Walker regained the seat for the UUP, beating Scotsman George Seawright of the DUP. In the 1987 general election the UUP and DUP agreed a pact in opposition to the Anglo-Irish Agreement. Seawright had been expelled from the DUP and stood in the election, reviving the Protestant Unionist Party label, but was unsuccessful.

Walker continued to hold the seat until 2001 but gained a reputation for inactivity. In the 2001 general election the DUP contested the seat for the first time since 1983, with their candidate Nigel Dodds campaigning heavily on both their opposition to the Good Friday Agreement and Walker's record. Walker also suffered from a disastrous television interview during the campaign. In the election Walker's vote collapsed to a mere 12%, coming fourth whilst Dodds won the seat. The UUP vote fell even further in both the 2003 Assembly election and the 2005 general election.

Nigel Dodds became the DUP's deputy leader and Commons leader in 2008, but the 2010 general election saw Sinn Féin increase their vote share and reduce the DUP majority. Sinn Féin targeted the seat in the 2015 general election, campaigning on returning the constituency's first Irish nationalist MP and the growing Catholic population surpassing Protestants. However, the DUP and the UUP agreed an electoral pact in which the UUP would withdraw their candidate to help re-elect an unionist. This allowed for Dodds to hold the seat comfortably with an increased majority, although a 4.3% swing to Sinn Féin in the 2017 general election confirmed the seat's marginal status.

Prior to the 2019 general election, the SDLP and UUP withdrew their candidates. In a highly divisive contest marred by threats from loyalist paramilitaries, John Finucane of Sinn Féin won with a majority of 1,943 votes. This meant that the 2019 election was the first time that Sinn Féin won multiple seats in Belfast and the first time Belfast North had elected a nationalist instead of a unionist. Dodds was replaced as Commons leader by Jeffrey Donaldson.

== Boundaries ==
Under the Redistribution of Seats Act 1885, the parliamentary borough of Belfast was expanded. The 2-seat borough constituency of Belfast in the House of Commons of the United Kingdom was divided into four divisions: East, South, West, and North.

The city boundaries were expanded under the Belfast Corporation Act 1896. Under the Redistribution of Seats (Ireland) Act 1918, the parliamentary borough was extended to include the whole city and the number of divisions increased from 4 to 9. The Duncairn and Shankill divisions largely replaced the North division. These boundaries were in effect at the 1918 general election.

The Government of Ireland Act 1920 established the Parliament of Northern Ireland, which came into operation in 1921. The representation of Northern Ireland in the Parliament of the United Kingdom was reduced from 30 MPs to 13 MPs, taking effect at the 1922 United Kingdom general election. These changes saw a 4-seat Belfast North constituency in the House of Commons of Northern Ireland and Belfast West re-established as a one-seat constituency at Westminster. The seat is centred on the north section of Belfast, though at times the area around the Docks on the north side of the Lagan Estuary has been part of variously Belfast East and Belfast West.

1885–1918	In the parliamentary borough of Belfast, St. Anne's ward (except so much as is comprised in the West division), so much of Dock ward as is bounded on the south-east by a line drawn along the centre of North Queen Strect, and on the north-east by a line drawn along the centre of New Lodge Road; and on the south-west by a line drawn along the centre of Limestone Road, and continued ina straight line to the centre of York Road, and on the east by 2 line drawn along the centre of Carrickfergus Road, and in the parish of Shankill, in the county of Antrim, the townlands of:— Ballygomartin, Ballysillan Lower, Greencastle (with the town of Greencastle), Legoniel (with the town of Legoniel), Lowwood, Old Park (with the town of Old Park), and Skegoniell, and so much of the townland of Ballyaghagan as is in the parliamentary borough.
1922–1950	The divisions of Duncairn (Duncairn ward and part of Clifton ward) and Shankill (Shankill ward and the remaining part of Clifton ward).
1950–1974	In the county borough of Belfast, the wards of Duncairn, Shankill and Clifton.
1974–1983	In the county borough of Belfast, the wards of Dock, Duncairn, Clifton and Shankill.
1983–1997	In Belfast, the wards of Ardoyne, Ballysillan, Bellevue, Castleview, Cavehill, Cliftonville, Crumlin, Duncairn, Fortwilliam, Grove, Legoniel, New Lodge, Shankill, and Woodvale.
1997–2010	In Belfast, the wards of Ardoyne, Ballysillan, Bellevue, Castleview, Cavehill, Chichester Park, Cliftonville, Crumlin, Duncairn, Fortwilliam, Legoniel, New Lodge, Water Works, and Woodvale, and in Newtownabbey, the wards of Abbey, Coole, Dunanney, Valley, and Whitehouse.
2010–2024	In Belfast, the wards of Ardoyne, Ballysillan, Bellevue, Castleview, Cavehill, Chichester Park, Cliftonville, Crumlin, Duncairn, Fortwilliam, Legoniel, New Lodge, Water Works, and Woodvale; and in Newtownabbey, the wards of Abbey, Ballyhenry, Cloughfern, Collinbridge, Coole, Dunanney, Glebe, Glengormley, Hightown, Valley, and Whitehouse.
2024–	In Antrim and Newtownabbey, the part of the Abbey ward to the south of the northern boundary of the 2008 Belfast North constituency, and the wards of Ballyhenry, Carnmoney Hill, Collinbridge, Glebe, Glengormley, Hightown, O'Neill, Rathcoole, Valley, Whitehouse ward; and in Belfast, the wards of Ardoyne, Ballysillan, Bellevue, Cavehill, Chichester Park, Cliftonville, Duncairn, Forth River, Fortwilliam, Innisfayle, Legoniel, New Lodge, Water Works.

== Members of parliament ==
Election	Member	Party
1885	Sir William Ewart	Irish Conservative
1889 by-election	Edward Harland	Irish Conservative
1896 by-election	James Horner Haslett	Irish Unionist
1905 by-election	Sir Daniel Dixon	Irish Unionist
1907 by-election	George Clark	Irish Unionist
Jan. 1910	Robert Thompson	Irish Unionist
1918	constituency abolished	
1922	constituency recreated	
1922	Thomas McConnell	UUP
1929	Thomas Somerset	UUP
1945	William Neill	UUP
1950	H. Montgomery Hyde	UUP
1959	Stratton Mills	UUP
1972	Stratton Mills	Conservative
1973	Stratton Mills	Alliance
Feb 1974	John Carson	UUP
1979	John McQuade	DUP
1983	Cecil Walker	UUP
2001	Nigel Dodds	DUP
2019	John Finucane	Sinn Féin

Monuments at Belfast City Hall – MPs for Belfast North

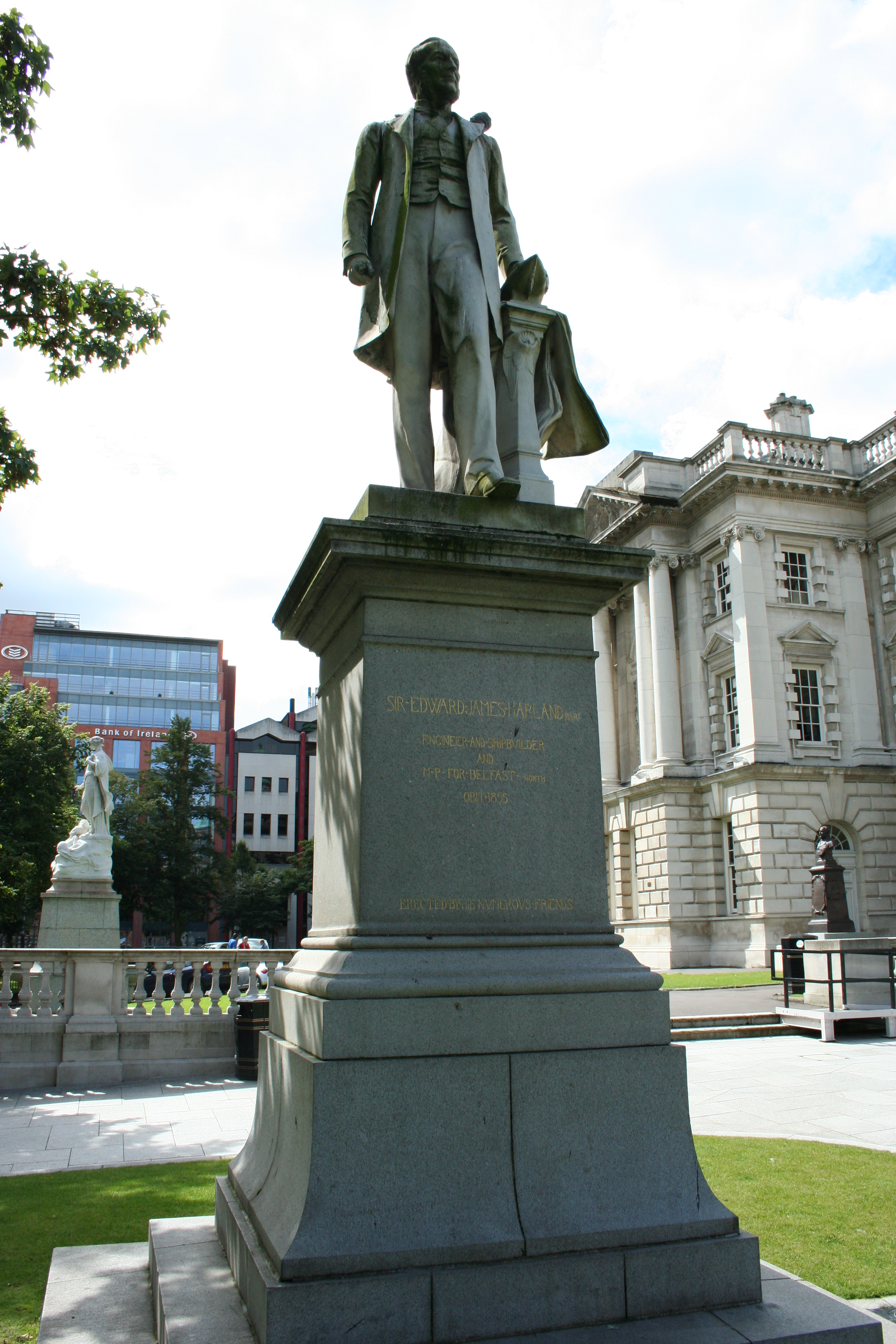
Edward James Harland MP, Lord Mayor of Belfast

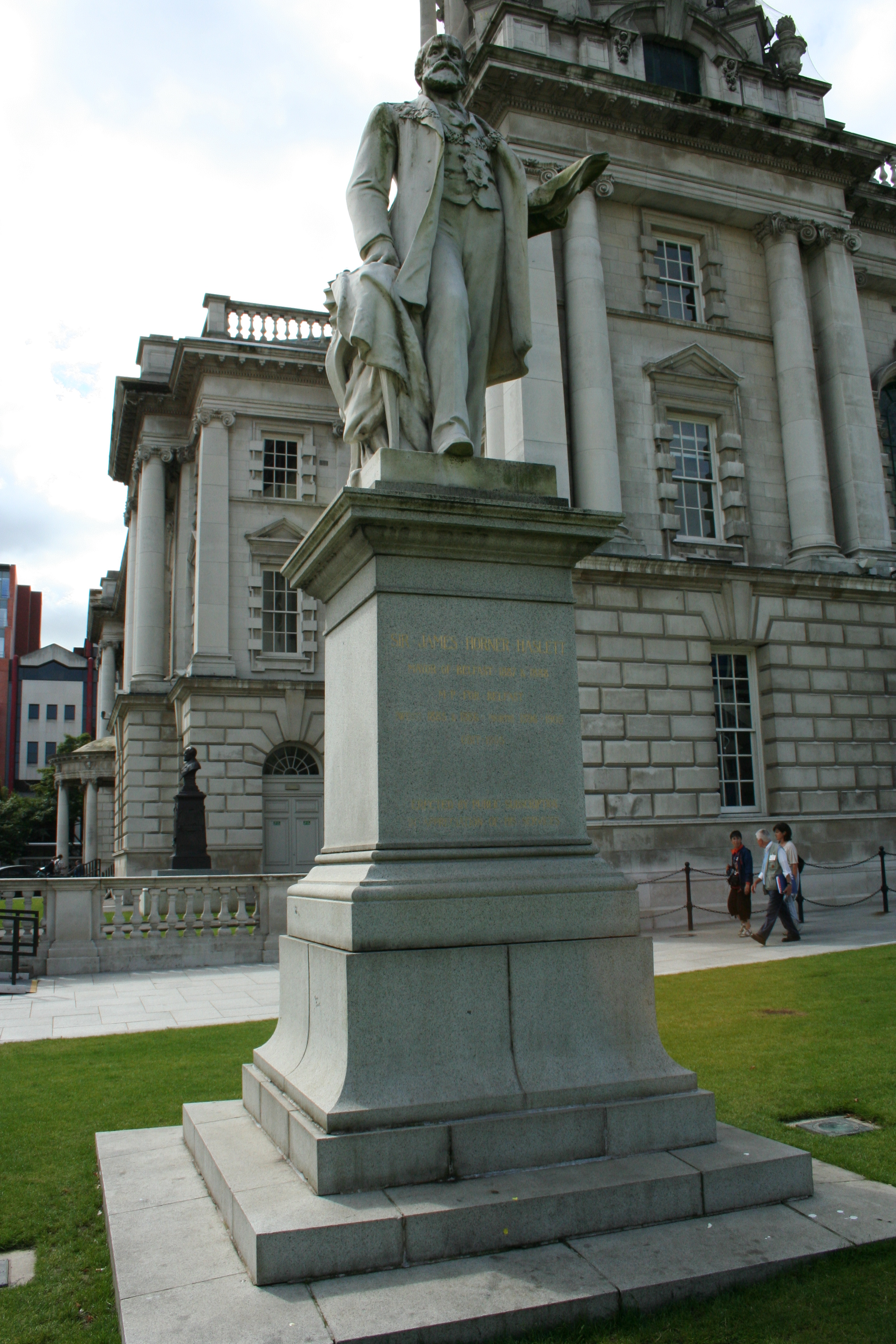
James Horner Haslett MP, Mayor of Belfast

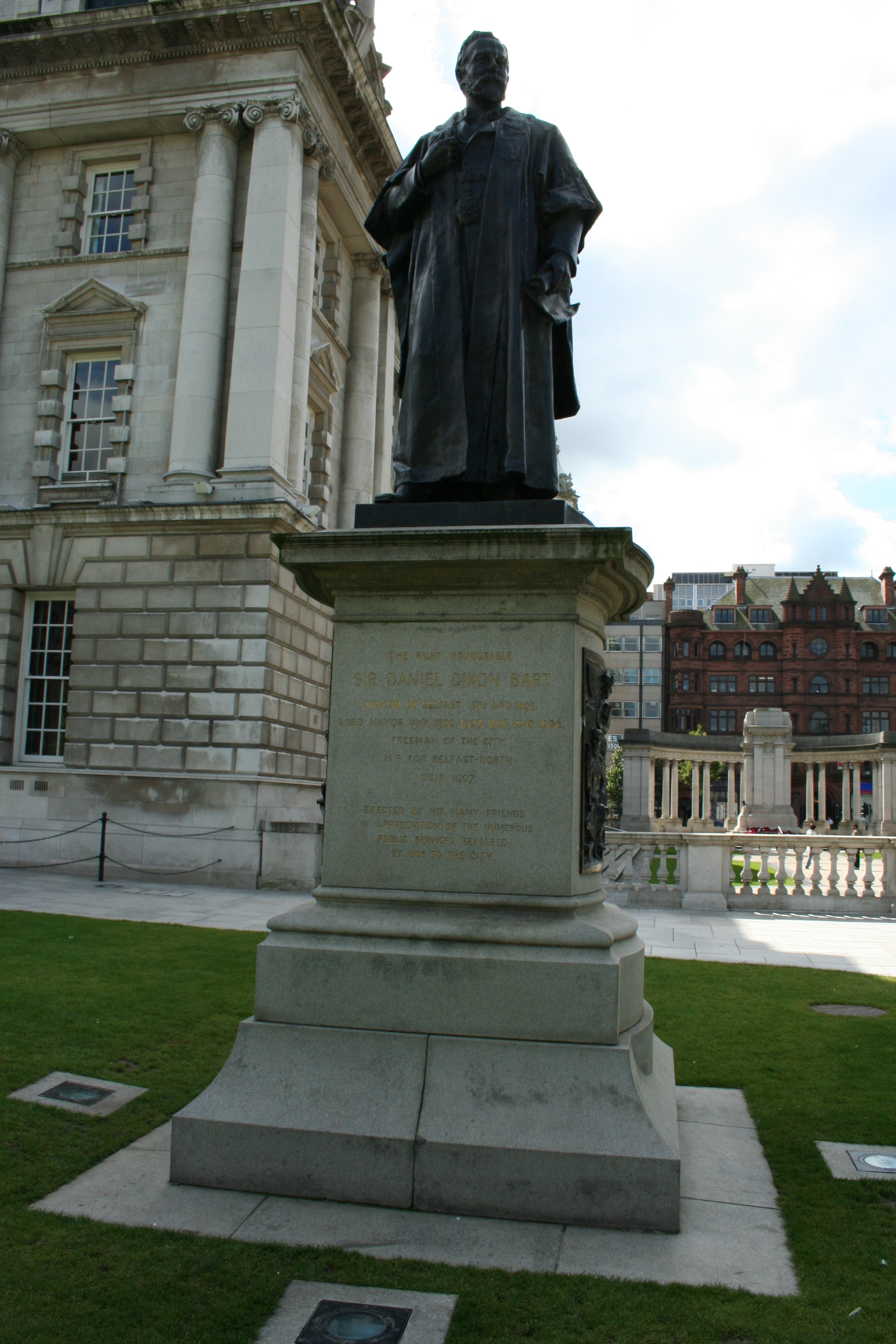
Sir Daniel Dixon MP, Lord Mayor of Belfast

== Elections ==
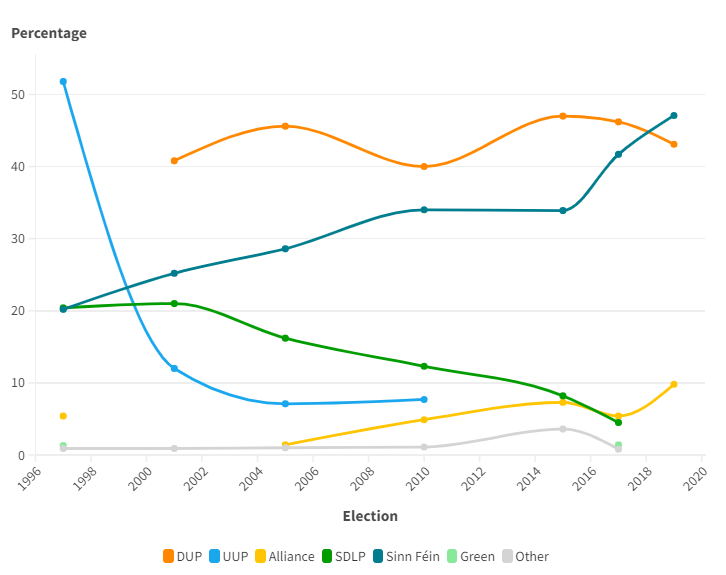

=== Elections in the 2020s ===
2024 general election: Belfast North
Party	Candidate	Votes	%	±%
Sinn Féin	John Finucane	17,674	43.7	▼4.4
DUP	Phillip Brett	12,062	29.8	▼10.5
Alliance	Nuala McAllister	4,274	10.6	0.0
TUV	David Clarke	2,877	7.1	New
SDLP	Carl Whyte	1,413	3.5	▲3.0
Green (NI)	Mal O'Hara	1,206	3.0	New
People Before Profit	Fiona Ferguson	946	2.3	▲2.2
Majority		5,612	13.9	▲9.9
Turnout		40,452	54.5	▼13.4
Registered electors		74,240		
Sinn Féin hold		Swing	▲3.05	

=== Elections in the 2010s ===
2019 notional result
Party excl. candidate	Vote	%
Sinn Féin	23,158	48.1
Democratic Unionist Party	19,419	40.3
Alliance	5,009	10.6
Social Democratic and Labour Party	255	0.5
Ulster Unionist Party	161	0.3
People Before Profit	57	0.1
Aontú	16	0.0
Conservatives	5	0.0
Majority	3,739	7.8
Turnout	48,140	67.4
Electorate	71,372	

2019 general election: Belfast North
Party	Candidate	Votes	%	±%
Sinn Féin	John Finucane	23,078	47.1	+5.4
DUP	Nigel Dodds	21,135	43.1	–3.1
Alliance	Nuala McAllister	4,824	9.8	+4.4
Majority		1,943	4.0	N/A
Turnout		49,037	67.9	+0.3
Registered electors		72,225		
Sinn Féin gain from DUP		Swing	+4.3	

This seat saw the only increase in vote share for Sinn Féin at the 2019 general election.

2017 general election: Belfast North
Party	Candidate	Votes	%	±%
DUP	Nigel Dodds	21,240	46.2	–0.8
Sinn Féin	John Finucane	19,159	41.7	+7.8
Alliance	Sam Nelson	2,475	5.4	–1.9
SDLP	Martin McAuley	2,058	4.5	–3.7
Green (NI)	Mal O'Hara	644	1.4	New
Workers' Party	Gemma Weir	360	0.8	–1.5
Majority		2,081	4.5	–8.6
Turnout		45,936	67.3	+8.1
Registered electors		68,249		
DUP hold		Swing	–4.3	

2015 general election: Belfast North
Party	Candidate	Votes	%	±%
DUP	Nigel Dodds	19,096	47.0	+7.0
Sinn Féin	Gerry Kelly	13,770	33.9	–0.1
SDLP	Alban Maginness	3,338	8.2	–4.1
Alliance	Jason O'Neill	2,941	7.3	+2.4
Workers' Party	Gemma Weir	919	2.3	New
Independent	Fra Hughes	529	1.3	New
Majority		5,326	13.1	+7.1
Turnout		40,593	59.2	+2.7
Registered electors		68,553		
DUP hold		Swing	+3.5	

2010 general election: Belfast North
Party	Candidate	Votes	%	±%
DUP	Nigel Dodds	14,812	40.0	–2.9
Sinn Féin	Gerry Kelly	12,588	34.0	+7.1
SDLP	Alban Maginness	4,544	12.3	–4.5
UCU-NF	Fred Cobain	2,837	7.7	–1.8
Alliance	Billy Webb	1,809	4.9	+2.0
Independent	Martin McAuley	403	1.1	New
Majority		2,224	6.0	–11.0
Turnout		36,993	56.5	–1.1
Registered electors		65,504		
DUP hold		Swing	–5.5	

=== Elections in the 2000s ===
2005 general election: Belfast North
Party	Candidate	Votes	%	±%
DUP	Nigel Dodds	13,935	45.6	+4.8
Sinn Féin	Gerry Kelly	8,747	28.6	+3.4
SDLP	Alban Maginness	4,950	16.2	–4.8
UUP	Fred Cobain	2,154	7.1	–4.9
Alliance	Marjorie Hawkins	438	1.4	New
Workers' Party	Marcella Delaney	165	0.5	–0.1
Rainbow Dream Ticket	Lynda Gilby	151	0.5	+0.2
Majority		5,188	17.0	+1.4
Turnout		30,540	57.8	–9.4
Registered electors		52,535		
DUP hold		Swing	+0.7	

2001 general election: Belfast North
Party	Candidate	Votes	%	±%
DUP	Nigel Dodds	16,718	40.8	New
Sinn Féin	Gerry Kelly	10,331	25.2	+5.0
SDLP	Alban Maginness	8,592	21.0	+0.6
UUP	Cecil Walker	4,904	12.0	–39.8
Workers' Party	Marcella Delaney	253	0.6	–0.1
Rainbow Dream Ticket	Rainbow George Weiss	134	0.3	New
Majority		6,387	15.6	N/A
Turnout		40,932	67.2	+3.0
Registered electors		60,941		
DUP gain from UUP		Swing		

=== Elections in the 1990s ===
1997 general election: Belfast North
Party	Candidate	Votes	%	±%
UUP	Cecil Walker	21,478	51.8	–0.6
SDLP	Alban Maginness	8,454	20.4	+1.9
Sinn Féin	Gerry Kelly	8,375	20.2	+8.7
Alliance	Tom Campbell	2,221	5.4	–2.4
Green (NI)	Peter Emerson	539	1.3	New
Workers' Party	Paul Treanor	297	0.7	N/A
Natural Law	Andrea Gribben	98	0.2	N/A
Majority		13,024	31.4	–2.5
Turnout		41,462	64.2	–1.0
Registered electors		64,645		
UUP hold		Swing	–1.2	

1997 changes are compared to the 1992 notional results shown below.

Notional 1992 UK general election result: Belfast North
Party	Candidate	Votes	%	±%
UUP	N/A	22,259	52.4	N/A
SDLP	N/A	7,867	18.52	N/A
Sinn Féin	N/A	4,882	11.5	N/A
Alliance	N/A	3,321	7.8	N/A
NI Conservatives	N/A	2,107	5.0	N/A
Others	N/A	2,041	4.8	N/A
Majority		14,392	33.9	N/A
UUP hold		Swing		

1992 general election: Belfast North
Party	Candidate	Votes	%	±%
UUP	Cecil Walker	17,240	48.0	+9.0
SDLP	Alban Maginness	7,615	21.2	+5.5
Sinn Féin	Paddy McManus	4,693	13.1	–0.7
Alliance	Tom Campbell	2,246	6.3	–1.5
NI Conservatives	Margaret Redpath	2,107	5.9	N/A
New Agenda	Seamus Lynch	1,386	3.9	N/A
Workers' Party	Margaret Smith	419	1.2	–7.1
Natural Law	David O'Leary	208	0.6	N/A
Majority		9,625	26.8	+3.5
Turnout		35,914	65.2	+2.9
Registered electors		55,068		
UUP hold		Swing		

=== Elections in the 1980s ===
1987 general election: Belfast North
Party	Candidate	Votes	%	±%
UUP	Cecil Walker	14,355	39.0	+2.8
SDLP	Alban Maginness	5,795	15.7	+1.7
Protestant Unionist	George Seawright	5,671	15.4	–4.1
Sinn Féin	Paddy McManus	5,062	13.8	+0.9
Workers' Party	Seamus Lynch	3,062	8.3	+2.6
Alliance	Tom Campbell	2,871	7.8	–1.3
Majority		8,560	23.3	+6.6
Turnout		36,816	62.3	–7.1
Registered electors		59,124		
UUP hold		Swing		

By-election 1986: Belfast North
Party	Candidate	Votes	%	±%
UUP	Cecil Walker	21,649	71.5	+35.3
Alliance	Paul Maguire	5,072	16.7	+7.6
Workers' Party	Seamus Lynch	3,563	11.8	+6.1
Majority		16,577	54.8	+38.1
Turnout		30,284	51.5	–17.9
Registered electors		59,791		
UUP hold		Swing		

1983 general election: Belfast North
Party	Candidate	Votes	%	±%
UUP	Cecil Walker	15,339	36.2	+10.9
DUP	George Seawright	8,260	19.5	–8.1
SDLP	Brian Feeney	5,944	14.0	–4.5
Sinn Féin	Joe Austin	5,451	12.9	New
Alliance	Paul Maguire	3,879	9.1	–0.6
Workers' Party	Seamus Lynch	2,412	5.7	+1.2
Independent DUP	William Gault	1,134	2.7	New
Majority		7,079	16.7	N/A
Turnout		42,419	69.4	+4.3
Registered electors		61,087		
UUP gain from DUP		Swing		

=== Elections in the 1970s ===
1979 general election: Belfast North
Party	Candidate	Votes	%	±%
DUP	Johnny McQuade	11,690	27.6	New
UUP	Cecil Walker	10,695	25.3	–37.3
SDLP	Paschal O'Hare	7,823	18.5	–6.6
Unionist Party NI	Anne Dickson	4,220	10.0	New
Alliance	John Cushnahan	4,120	9.7	+1.6
Republican Clubs	Seamus Lynch	1,907	4.5	New
NI Labour	Alan Carr	1,889	4.4	–0.8
Majority		995	2.3	N/A
Turnout		42,344	65.1	–0.8
Registered electors		65,073		
DUP gain from UUP		Swing		

October 1974 general election: Belfast North
Party	Candidate	Votes	%	±%
UUP	John Carson	29,662	62.6	+18.9
SDLP	Thomas Donnelly	11,400	24.1	–0.3
Alliance	John Ferguson	3,807	8.1	New
NI Labour	Billy Boyd	2,481	5.2	–0.7
Majority		18,222	38.5	+20.7
Turnout		47,670	65.9	–2.3
Registered electors		71,779		
UUP hold		Swing		

February 1974 general election: Belfast North
Party	Candidate	Votes	%	±%
UUP	John Carson	21,531	43.7	–4.8
Pro-Assembly Unionist	David Smyth	12,755	25.9	New
SDLP	Thomas Donnelly	12,003	24.4	New
NI Labour	Sandy Scott	2,917	5.9	–26.0
Majority		8,776	17.8	+1.2
Turnout		49,206	68.2	–9.8
Registered electors		72,178		
UUP hold		Swing		

1970 general election: Belfast North
Party	Candidate	Votes	%	±%
UUP	Stratton Mills	28,668	48.5	–8.9
NI Labour	John Sharkey	18,894	31.9	–10.7
Protestant Unionist	William Beattie	11,173	18.8	New
Ind. Unionist	John McKeague	441	0.8	New
Majority		9,774	16.6	+1.8
Turnout		59,176	78.0	+12.5
Registered electors		75,740		
UUP hold		Swing		

=== Elections in the 1960s ===
1966 general election: Belfast North
Party	Candidate	Votes	%	±%
UUP	Stratton Mills	26,891	57.4	–2.2
NI Labour	David Overend	19,927	42.6	+7.7
Majority		6,964	14.8	–9.9
Turnout		46,818	65.5	–4.0
Registered electors		71,434		
UUP hold		Swing		

1964 general election: Belfast North
Party	Candidate	Votes	%	±%
UUP	Stratton Mills	29,976	59.6	–1.1
NI Labour	Jack McDowell	17,564	34.9	–0.3
Ind. Republican	Francis McGlade	2,743	5.5	New
Majority		12,412	24.7	–0.9
Turnout		50,283	69.5	–1.6
Registered electors		72,400		
UUP hold		Swing		

=== Elections in the 1950s ===
1959 general election: Belfast North
Party	Candidate	Votes	%	±%
UUP	Stratton Mills	32,173	60.7	–2.6
NI Labour	Jack McDowell	18,640	35.2	+7.0
Sinn Féin	Francis McGlade	2,156	4.1	–4.4
Majority		13,533	25.6	–9.5
Turnout		52,969	71.1	+1.8
Registered electors		74,494		
UUP hold		Swing		

1955 general election: Belfast North
Party	Candidate	Votes	%	±%
UUP	H. Montgomery Hyde	33,745	63.3	+2.6
NI Labour	Billy Boyd	15,065	28.2	–11.1
Sinn Féin	Francis McGlade	4,534	8.5	New
Majority		18,680	35.1	+13.7
Turnout		53,344	69.3	–6.4
Registered electors		76,990		
UUP hold		Swing		

1951 general election: Belfast North
Party	Candidate	Votes	%	±%
UUP	H. Montgomery Hyde	34,995	60.7	–3.7
NI Labour	James Morrow	22,685	39.3	+3.7
Majority		12,310	21.4	–7.4
Turnout		57,680	75.7	+0.8
Registered electors		76,243		
UUP hold		Swing		

1950 general election: Belfast North
Party	Candidate	Votes	%	±%
UUP	H. Montgomery Hyde	36,412	64.4	+9.1
NI Labour	William Leeburn	20,146	35.6	–9.1
Majority		16,266	28.8	+18.2
Turnout		56,558	74.9	+11.3
Registered electors		75,563		
UUP hold		Swing		

=== Elections in the 1940s ===
1945 general election: Belfast North
Party	Candidate	Votes	%	±%
UUP	William Neill	25,761	55.3	N/A
NI Labour	William Leeburn	20,845	44.7	New
Majority		4,916	10.6	N/A
Turnout		46,606	63.6	N/A
Registered electors		73,231		
UUP hold		Swing	N/A	

=== Elections in the 1930s ===
1935 general election: Belfast North
Party	Candidate	Votes	%	±%
UUP	Thomas Somerset	Unopposed		
Registered electors		64,259		
UUP hold				

1931 general election: Belfast North
Party	Candidate	Votes	%	±%
UUP	Thomas Somerset	Unopposed		
Registered electors		62,017		
UUP hold				

=== Elections in the 1920s ===
1929 general election: Belfast North
Party	Candidate	Votes	%	±%
UUP	Thomas Somerset	27,812	62.1	–34.5
Ind. Unionist	Tommy Henderson	10,909	24.4	New
Temperance Unionist and Local Optionist	David Wilson	6,059	13.5	New
Majority		16,903	37.7	–55.5
Turnout		44,780	72.9	–2.5
Registered electors		61,438		
UUP hold		Swing		

1924 general election: Belfast North
Party	Candidate	Votes	%	±%
UUP	Thomas McConnell	34,182	96.6	+41.1
Sinn Féin	Hugh Corvin	1,192	3.4	New
Majority		32,990	93.2	+88.2
Turnout		35,374	75.4	+7.2
Registered electors		46,902		
UUP hold		Swing		

1923 general election: Belfast North
Party	Candidate	Votes	%	±%
UUP	Thomas McConnell	16,771	52.5	N/A
Ind. Unionist	Tommy Henderson	15,171	47.5	New
Majority		1,600	5.0	N/A
Turnout		31,942	68.2	N/A
Registered electors		46,844		
UUP hold		Swing	N/A	

1922 general election: Belfast North
Party	Candidate	Votes	%	±%
UUP	Thomas McConnell	Unopposed		
Registered electors				
UUP win (new seat)				

=== Elections in the 1910s ===
December 1910 general election: Belfast North
Party	Candidate	Votes	%	±%
UUP	Robert Thompson	Unopposed		
Registered electors				
UUP hold				

January 1910 general election: Belfast North
Party	Candidate	Votes	%	±%
UUP	Robert Thompson	6,275	61.4	+9.9
Labour	Robert Gageby	3,951	38.6	–9.9
Majority		2,324	22.8	+19.8
Turnout		10,226	86.4	+1.8
Registered electors		11,829		
UUP hold		Swing	+9.9	

=== Elections in the 1900s ===
1907 Belfast North by-election
Party	Candidate	Votes	%	±%
Irish Unionist	George Clark	6,021	58.9	+7.4
Labour	William Walker	4,194	41.1	–7.4
Majority		1,827	17.8	+14.8
Turnout		10,215	84.7	+1.1
Registered electors		12,065		
Irish Unionist hold		Swing	+7.4	

1906 general election: Belfast North
Party	Candidate	Votes	%	±%
Irish Unionist	Daniel Dixon	4,907	51.5	–17.7
Labour Repr. Cmte.	William Walker	4,616	48.5	N/A
Majority		291	3.0	–35.4
Turnout		9,523	83.6	+24.0
Registered electors		11,385		
Irish Unionist hold		Swing		

1905 Belfast North by-election
Party	Candidate	Votes	%	±%
Irish Unionist	Daniel Dixon	4,440	52.8	–16.4
Labour Repr. Cmte.	William Walker	3,966	47.2	New
Majority		474	5.6	–32.8
Turnout		8,406	78.1	+18.5
Registered electors		10,762		
Irish Unionist hold		Swing		

1900 general election: Belfast North
Party	Candidate	Votes	%	±%
Irish Unionist	James Horner Haslett	4,172	69.2	N/A
Independent Liberal Unionist	Thomas Harrison	1,855	30.8	New
Majority		2,317	38.4	N/A
Turnout		6,027	59.6	N/A
Registered electors		10,117		
Irish Unionist hold		Swing	N/A	

=== Elections in the 1890s ===
1896 Belfast North by-election
Party	Candidate	Votes	%	±%
Irish Unionist	James Horner Haslett	3,595	51.1	N/A
Ind. Unionist	Adam Turner	3,434	48.9	New
Majority		161	2.2	N/A
Turnout		7,029	76.4	N/A
Registered electors		9,201		
Irish Unionist hold		Swing	N/A	

1895 general election: Belfast North
Party	Candidate	Votes	%	±%
Irish Unionist	Edward Harland	Unopposed		
Registered electors				
Irish Unionist hold				

1892 general election: Belfast North
Party	Candidate	Votes	%	±%
Irish Unionist	Edward Harland	Unopposed		
Registered electors		8,610		
Irish Unionist hold				

=== Elections in the 1880s ===
1889 Belfast North by-election
Party	Candidate	Votes	%	±%
Irish Conservative	Edward Harland	Unopposed		
Registered electors		6,469		
Irish Conservative hold				

1886 general election: Belfast North
Party	Candidate	Votes	%	±%
Irish Conservative	William Ewart	4,522	86.1	+11.5
Irish Parliamentary	Charles James Dempsey	732	13.9	New
Majority		3,790	72.2	+23.0
Turnout		5,254	76.9	+0.1
Registered electors		6,831		
Irish Conservative hold		Swing		

1885 general election: Belfast North
Party	Candidate	Votes	%	±%
Irish Conservative	William Ewart	3,915	74.6	N/A
Independent	Alexander Bowman	1,330	25.4	N/A
Majority		2,585	49.2	N/A
Turnout		5,245	76.8	N/A
Registered electors		6,831		
Irish Conservative win (new seat)				
