= Martin Snodden =

Northern Irish former loyalist paramilitary and peace activist

- Born: c. 1954; Belfast, Northern Ireland
- Organization(s): EPIC; Conflict Trauma Resource Centre
- Known for: Former Ulster Volunteer Force member Peace/conflict resolution activist

Martin Snodden (born c. 1954) is a Northern Irish peace activist and former loyalist paramilitary. During the Troubles, he was a member of the Ulster Volunteer Force (UVF) and was sentenced to life imprisonment in 1975 for the murder of Marie Doyle, a 38-year old Catholic civilian who was killed during the UVF bombing of Conway's Bar in north Belfast. Snodden served approximately 15 years in prison.

Following his release, Snodden became involved in organisations and worked with former political prisoners to deal with conflict resolution, trauma support and reconciliation. He was director of EPIC, an organisation supporting former loyalist prisoners, and later headed the Conflict Trauma Resource Centre in Belfast.

== Early life and paramilitary activity ==
Snodden grew up in Belfast and became involved in loyalist paramilitarism as a young man during the early years of the Troubles. On 13 March 1975, he took part in a UVF bombing at Conway's Bar on the Shore Road in Belfast. A bomb being planted by the group exploded prematurely, killing UVF member George Brown and 38-year-old Catholic civilian Marie Doyle, as well as injuring several other people.

Snodden and fellow UVF member Edward Kinner were subsequently charged and (in December 1975) sentenced to life imprisonment for Doyle's murder. Snodden later said that the intended targets of the bombing had been republican paramilitaries.

== Imprisonment ==
Snodden spent around 15 years in prison, including time in the Maze prison. During his time in prison, he took part in political discussions among other loyalist inmates and read books on Irish history, politics and social inequality. Snodden, alongside David Ervine, Billy Hutchinson and Billy Mitchell have been seen as helping develop a more politically oriented strand of loyalism that focused on working-class Protestant communities.

== Community and peace work ==
Following his release, Snodden became involved with EPIC, an organisation established to assist former loyalist prisoners integrate into society. By 2000, he was its director. He was involved in discussions between representatives of republican and loyalist communities (including former prisoners) before the paramilitary ceasefires of the 1990s.

He later became director of the Belfast-based Conflict Trauma Resource Centre (CTRC), which worked with people affected by the Troubles. By 2005, The Independent described him as an international trauma and conflict-resolution worker.

== See also ==
- Progressive Unionist Party
- Gusty Spence
- Northern Ireland peace process
