= Linda Ervine =

British activist

Linda Ervine MBE MRIA

Council of State
- Incumbent
- Assumed office 31 March 2026
- Appointed by: Catherine Connolly

Personal details
- Born: Belfast, Northern Ireland
- Spouse: Brian Ervine

Linda Ervine (née Bruton) MBE MRIA is a language rights activist from East Belfast, Northern Ireland. She is an Ulster Irish speaker and supporter of the Gaelic revival and is the project leader of the "Turas" Irish language project which "aims to connect people from Protestant communities to their own history with the Irish language". Turas is operated through the East Belfast Mission of the Methodist Church in Ireland. Ervine has attracted media attention because of her coming from a Protestant and Unionist family background and her support for an Irish Language Act (a position generally regarded in her community as unconventional). She has also served on the Irish Council of State.

== Personal life ==
Ervine comes from an Ulster Protestant background, and she supports Northern Ireland remaining within the United Kingdom; her family held socialist and trade unionist views when she was growing up. She is the sister-in-law of David Ervine, a former member of the loyalist paramilitary Ulster Volunteer Force and later the leader of the Progressive Unionist Party. Her husband Brian Ervine also led that party.

== Irish language activism ==
Ervine began her involvement with language issues through a six-week introduction to Irish with the East Belfast Mission (a community development organisation founded in 1985) and Short Strand cross community women's group. She then joined a beginners class at the cultural centre An Droichead on the Ormeau Road in Belfast. From November 2011 onwards she ran a beginners' class in the Irish language in Newtownards Road which became the Turas Irish-Language Project.

Because unionists in Northern Ireland traditionally associate revival efforts for Celtic languages exclusively with the Catholic Church in Ireland and with Irish republicanism, Ervine has often lectured publicly about Douglas Hyde and the Protestant history of involvement in the Gaelic revival and about the Scottish Gaelic-speaking Presbyterian communities in the Hebrides. She has also repeatedly urged the Ulster Unionist Party, the Democratic Unionist Party, and the Orange Order not to treat the Irish language, Irish traditional music, Gaelic games, and Irish culture as the exclusive preserve of Irish republicanism.

In December 2014, along with Alasdair Morrison; a native Scottish Gaelic-speaker from the Protestant stronghold of North Uist and member of the Scottish Parliament for 1999–2007, standing for the British Labour Party; she visited Stormont urging "fair treatment and respect for the Irish language." She supported the proposed Irish Language Act for Northern Ireland, saying that Ulster unionists have "nothing to fear" from the legislation and that non-Irish speakers will not be negatively impacted.

== Recognition ==
In 2020, she became the first president of the newly formed East Belfast GAA.

In 2024, Ervine was made a member of the Royal Irish Academy.

In March 2026, she was appointed to the Irish Council of State by President Catherine Connolly
