= Young Citizen Volunteers (1972) =

Youth paramilitary organisation in Northern Ireland

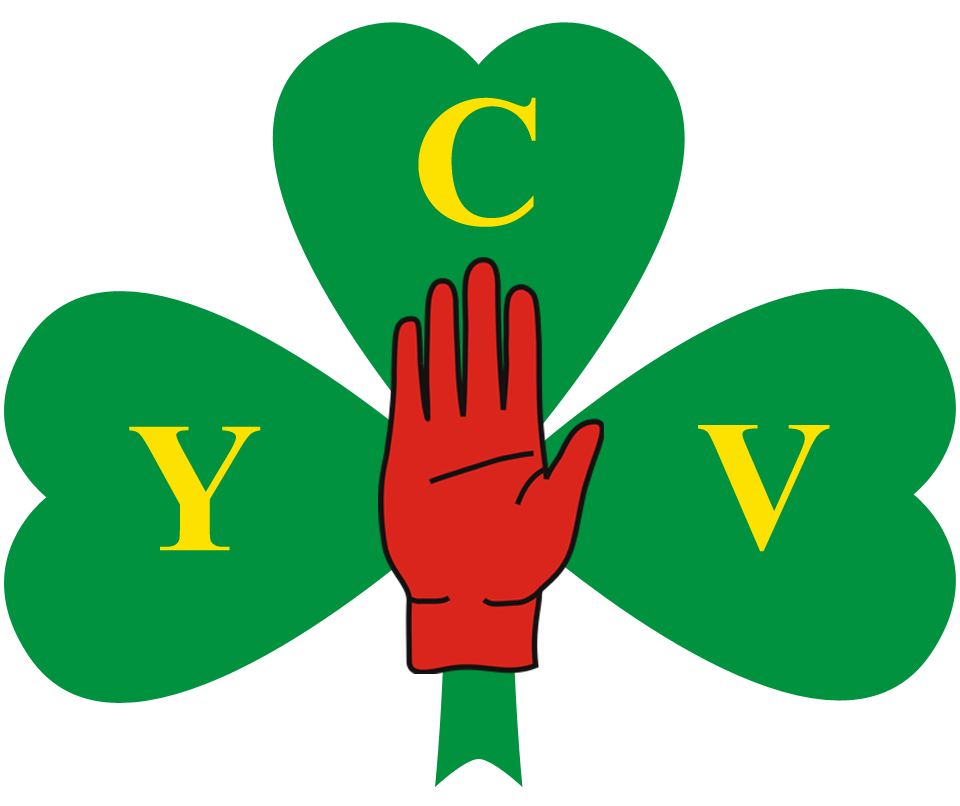
Emblem used by the YCV.

The Young Citizen Volunteers of Ireland, or Young Citizen Volunteers (YCV) for short, was a loyalist paramilitary organisation for loyalist youths which later became the youth wing of Ulster loyalist paramilitary group the Ulster Volunteer Force. It appropriated the name of the original Young Citizen Volunteers formed in 1912 as a British civic organisation.

== Establishment ==
The modern UVF was established in Belfast's Shankill Road area by Gusty Spence and others in 1966. The new group quickly undertook a sectarian campaign of arson and murder. During the early 1970s a group of loyalist youths who supported local football teams congregated on the Shankill Road and were regularly involved in clashes with the nationalist Unity Flats area on their way to and from football matches. One of their number was Billy Hutchinson who was close to the UVF and who organised these youths into a new UVF youth group, resurrecting the old YCV name in the process. Along with Billy Spence, Hutchinson oversaw a recruitment drive for the new group, which expanded quickly in its first few years of existence. The reformation of the YCV had been organised by Gusty Spence following his escape from prison, which dates the event to 1972.

== Activities ==
Activities carried out by the YCV included throwing petrol bombs at Catholic homes. Writer Tim Pat Coogan has compared it to the Fianna Éireann and Ulster Young Militants (UYM), with all three characterised as "a military scouting movement which acts as a youthful recruiting agency" for the respective paramilitary group. In late 1974 the head of the YCV, who was not identified, even became the Chief of Staff of the UVF itself after a power struggle with the incumbent Ken Gibson. The group expanded beyond Belfast into other UVF areas, notably Mid-Ulster where Billy Wright joined the group at around the age of 14. Eddie Kinner, who went to hold leading positions in both the UVF and the Progressive Unionist Party, was also a member and demonstrated his support by sporting the initials YCV on his school bag.

In late 1974 two Catholics, Michael Loughran and Eddie Morgan, were shot and killed by two YCV members, Billy Hutchinson and Thomas Winstone, on the Falls Road. During the subsequent trial, at which both defendants were convicted of murder, a Royal Ulster Constabulary officer giving evidence stated that the YCV had been reformed solely as a sectarian group to kill Catholics.

Although their profile fell somewhat after Hutchinson's imprisonment the YCV continued to exist alongside the UVF for the duration of the Troubles and beyond. In 2001 it was reported by Pastor Jack McKee, a born-again Christian preacher noted for his anti-paramilitary activity, that in secondary schools around the Shankill some pupils had to be let out at different times and from different gates depending on whether they were members of the YCV or UYM, due to a loyalist feud that was ongoing between the UVF and the UDA West Belfast Brigade.

Along with those of the UVF and the Red Hand Commando (RHC), YCV flags are regularly carried by loyalist flute band colour parties during the marching season, particularly in Belfast.

The YCV is not listed a proscribed organisation by the British government although its UVF parent organisation is included on the list.

== See also ==
- Ulster Young Militants
- Independent International Commission on Decommissioning (IICD) - Organisation overseeing Decommissioning,
- Independent Monitoring Commission (IMC) - Organisation monitoring activity by paramilitary groups.
- Ulster Loyalism
