= Billy Giles =

Northern Irish politician (1957–1998)

- Born: William Alexander Ellis Giles; 3 September 1957; Belfast, Northern Ireland
- Died: 25 September 1998 (aged 41); Belfast, Northern Ireland
- Occupations: Activist and militant
- Political party: Progressive Unionist Party
- Military career
- Paramilitary: Ulster Volunteer Force
- Conflict: The Troubles

Billy Giles (3 September 1957 – 25 September 1998) was an Ulster Volunteer Force volunteer who later became active in politics following his release from the Maze Prison in 1997 after serving 14 years of a life sentence for murder.

== Family life ==
Billy Giles was born William Alexander Ellis Giles in Belfast, Northern Ireland on 3 September 1957, and grew up in Island Street, in loyalist east Belfast. His father Sam, worked as a plater in the nearby Harland & Wolff shipyard, and his mother, Lily was a housewife. Giles was the eldest of six children. The Giles family was very religious, the Protestant church having been the centre of their lives. Giles often attended the rallies of Ian Paisley, and was strongly influenced by his sermons. His father, a former soldier in the British Army, was a member of the Orange Order, The Royal Black Preceptory, and The Apprentice Boys of Derry. His brothers also served in the army.

== The Troubles ==
At the age of 14, he witnessed first-hand the events of Bloody Friday on 21 July 1972 when the Provisional IRA exploded 26 bombs across Belfast, killing nine people, and injuring 103. As the years passed, he found himself attending many funerals of friends he had lost and people he had known. In 1975, he joined the Ulster Volunteer Force (UVF) and was trained in the use of weapons and explosives by former military personnel; he had just turned 18 years old. At the outbreak of the republican hunger strike in 1981, Giles had gradually become disassociated from the UVF. Following the deaths of the ten republican prisoners, however, Giles believed that, in the wake of the hunger strike, "there was going to be an uprising and they [Protestants] were all going to be slaughtered" by the IRA. Giles mentally prepared himself to go to war against the IRA and therefore returned as an active member of the UVF.

=== Killing ===
On 19 November 1981 in Newtownards, Billy Giles abducted a Roman Catholic married man, Michael Fay, and shot him in the back of the head, killing him instantly. He then stuffed the body in the car's boot. Fay had been Giles' friend and workmate. The killing was in retaliation for the fatal shooting of Karen McKeown, a young Protestant Sunday school teacher by the Irish National Liberation Army two months previously. Giles was arrested by the Royal Ulster Constabulary (RUC) and brought to the Castlereagh interrogation centre, where he confessed to the killing. He was found guilty of the murder and sentenced to life imprisonment in the Maze Prison.

=== Life in the Maze ===
Giles was housed in the prison's H-Blocks. He spent his time studying and took several GCSEs; he eventually obtained an Open University degree in Social Sciences. He also wrote a play about his childhood in Island Street called Boy Girl. It was later performed before a Belfast audience; his parents were present at the performance. Few people present at the performance were aware that it was the work of a UVF prisoner.

It took Giles seven years before he adjusted to life inside The Maze. He gave many interviews to British journalist, Peter Taylor, to whom he confessed his deep remorse at the killing of Michael Fay, saying that he had "never felt like a whole person again" since the fatal shooting.

On two separate occasions, Giles claimed he had saved the lives of prison officers inside the Maze: the first time when he stopped an inmate from cutting an officer's throat and the second time during a prison riot in March 1995 when he persuaded his inmates to stop the wrecking and to allow free passage to the block staff.

== Progressive Unionist Party ==
He was released on 4 July 1997 after serving 14 years of his life sentence. He immediately commenced work with the Progressive Unionist Party also known as PUP, and concentrated on helping released Loyalist prisoners to resettle into the community. At the signing of the Good Friday Agreement on 10 April 1998 at Stormont, Giles was part of PUP's negotiating team. He told Peter Taylor that he felt optimistic about the future of Northern Ireland and his own.

== Death ==
Despite his degree, he was unable to obtain a proper job that paid a decent salary. On the night of 24–25 September after composing a four-page letter of explanation and naming himself a "victim of the Troubles", Billy Giles hanged himself in his living room. He was 41 years old. Peter Taylor visited Giles' family in east Belfast on the eve of the funeral. He described Giles as lying in the coffin wearing his best suit, and his UVF badge with the inscribed words "For God and Ulster" was pinned to his lapel. One of his last lines in his letter read, "Please let the next generation live normal lives". This line was quoted during a speech given by Colm Cavanagh, vice-president of The Alliance Party of Northern Ireland on 3 March 2006 to The Department of Education. His friend and former UVF colleague Billy Mitchell, who was strongly critical of trauma counselling and a psychological approach to former paramilitaries, suggested that Giles' suicide had been prompted by a "trauma workshop" Giles had attended in South Africa. This was in contrast to Taylor, who believed that Giles killed himself because of the remorse he felt about his involvement in UVF violence.

Giles is commemorated, along with other prominent Loyalist paramilitaries, in the controversial UVF song Battalion of the Dead.
