= John Kyle (Northern Ireland politician) =

Northern Irish unionist politician and General practitioner

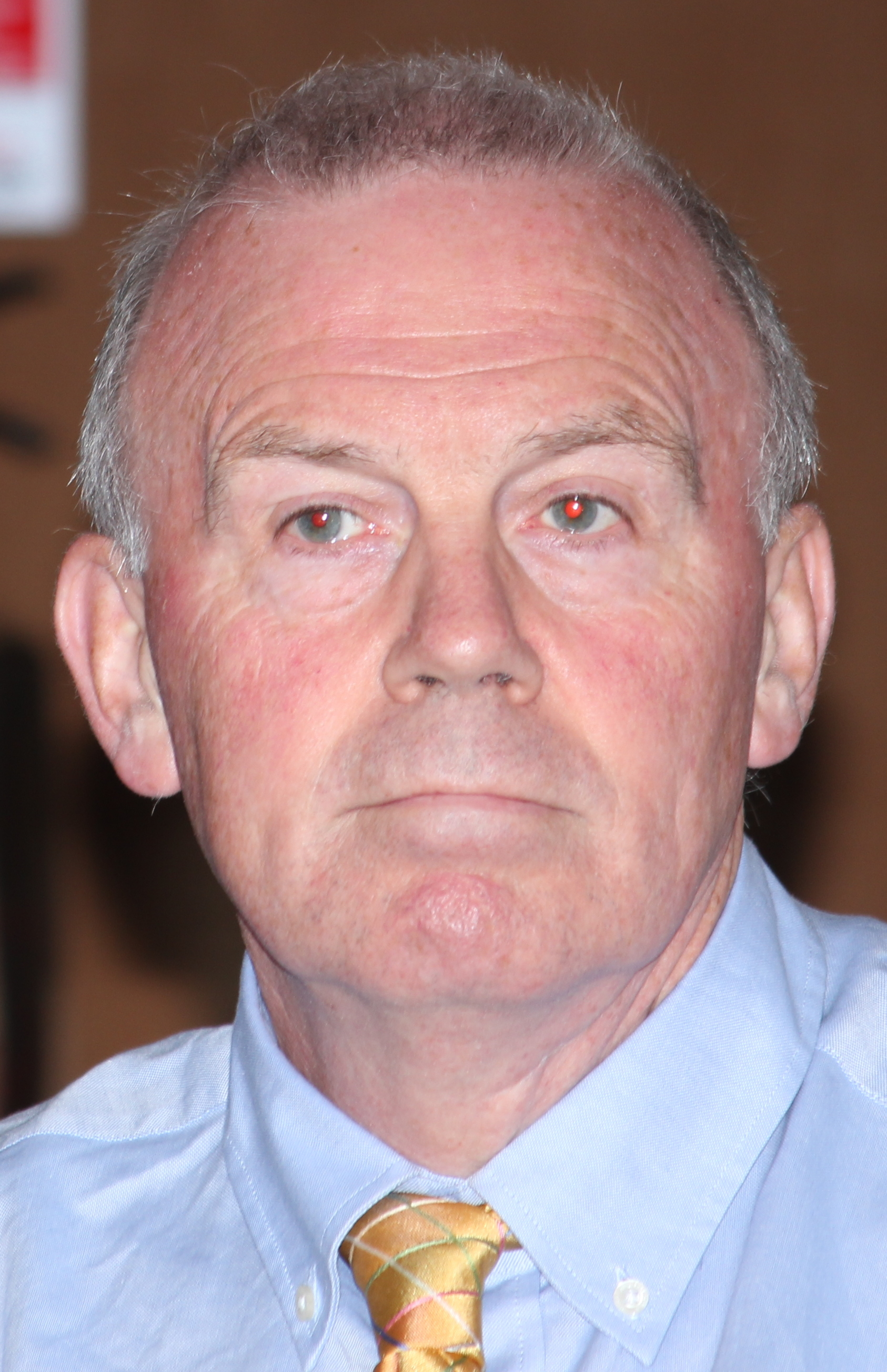
- Kyle in 2013

High Sheriff of Belfast
- In office January 2023 – January 2024
- Preceded by: John Hussey
- Succeeded by: Sammy Douglas

Deputy leader of the Progressive Unionist Party
- In office 2012 – 16 December 2021
- Leader: Billy Hutchinson
- Preceded by: Nigel Gardiner
- Succeeded by: Russell Watton

Interim Leader of the Progressive Unionist Party
- In office 3 June 2010 – 16 October 2010
- Preceded by: Dawn Purvis
- Succeeded by: Brian Ervine

Member of Belfast City Council
- In office 22 May 2014 – 18 May 2023
- Preceded by: District created
- Succeeded by: Pádraig Donnelly
- Constituency: Titanic
- In office 28 February 2007 – 22 May 2014
- Preceded by: David Ervine
- Succeeded by: District abolished
- Constituency: Pottinger

Personal details
- Born: January 1952 (age 74) Belfast, Northern Ireland
- Party: UUP (since 2022)
- Other political affiliations: Independent (2021 - 2022); PUP (2000 - 2021)
- Children: 5
- Education: Queens University of Belfast
- Profession: General Practitioner
- Website: Cllr Dr John Kyle

Samuel John Kyle (born January 1952) is a Northern Irish unionist politician and General practitioner who was High Sheriff of Belfast from 2023 to 2024, and was a Belfast City Councillor for the Titanic (formerly Pottinger) DEA from 2007 to 2023. Additionally, he served as interim leader of the centre-left loyalist Progressive Unionist Party (PUP) in 2010, then as deputy leader from 2012 to 2021.

== Background ==
Kyle was born in East Belfast and attended Grosvenor Grammar School and Queen's University Belfast (QUB). He graduated as a medical doctor in 1975 and has practiced medicine in Belfast and London. Since 1993, he has been a General Practitioner at Holywood Arches Health Centre.

Kyle was co-opted onto Belfast City Council, following the death of party leader, MLA and Pottinger councillor David Ervine in 2007, sitting with party colleague, Hugh Smyth. He was a member of Belfast City Council's Development Committee, Health and Environmental Services Committee, and the Parks and Leisure Committee.

Due to the planned change in local councils in Northern Ireland, the local elections due for 2009 were postponed, awaiting provisions for the new eleven-council model (as agreed by the DUP/Sinn Féin led government); and as a result Kyle, along with all other councillors remained in office. Following the resignation of Dawn Purvis MLA from the party on 3 June 2010, Kyle was selected as interim leader.

Purvis' resignation came in the aftermath of a killing in the Shankill Road area of West Belfast, widely believed to be carried out by the PUP-linked Ulster Volunteer Force. Purvis announced that she could "no longer offer leadership to a political party which is expected to answer for the indefensible actions of others", in a clear reference to the killing.

Kyle, as a result, became interim leader of a party facing a very uncertain future; with no representation in the Northern Ireland Assembly, and loyalist politics in clear disagreement with the UVF. On the day after the funeral of the murdered man, Kyle claimed that he believed that the UVF had still not decommissioned all of its weapons - as previously confirmed by the Independent Monitoring Commission.

A General Meeting of the Progressive Unionist Party, held in Belfast on 10 June 2010, issued a statement detailing the Party's continued support of Dr Kyle as interim leader, whilst the party has "space and time for a period of mature and considered reflection with reference to its future direction."

He was re-elected to the council in 2011, and was later elected onto the successor Titanic District in 2014.

Kyle has campaigned over a period of years against expansion of the George Best Belfast City Airport because of alleged noise and other effects on householders.

Kyle was the PUP candidate in East Belfast at the 2016 and 2017 Northern Ireland Assembly elections, though was not elected on both attempts.

He was re-elected to the council in 2019, again for the Titanic District.

In November 2021, during an interview on BBC's The View programme, Kyle said that the Northern Ireland Protocol could present "significant opportunities" if some "serious problems" are addressed. The PUP distanced themselves from Kyle's comments, releasing a statement, saying: “Last night on BBC’s The View Dr Kyle gave his personal opinion on the Protocol. He is entitled to do so but this is not the position of our party. Our position remains unchanged and is as set out in our constitutional statement. For the avoidance of doubt, the Protocol must go.”

He resigned from the PUP the following month, saying: "While we agree that the Northern Ireland Protocol has created major difficulties for Northern Ireland and has critically undermined the Good Friday Agreement, we respectfully but strongly differ on how best to address these problems."

After briefly sitting as an independent, he joined the Ulster Unionist Party (UUP) in February 2022.

In June 2022, the UUP nominated Kyle for its seat on the Education Authority board.

In December 2022, nearly a year after his defection, Kyle said that he would not be standing at the 2023 local elections.

He was appointed High Sheriff of Belfast in January 2023.

== Personal life ==
Kyle lives in his native East Belfast, and is married with five grown children.

Party political offices
Preceded by Dawn Purvis	Leader of the Progressive Unionist Party; 2010	Succeeded by Brian Ervine
Preceded by Nigel Gardiner	Deputy Leader of the Progressive Unionist Party; 2012–2021	Vacant
