= Turas =

Irish-language project in Belfast, Northern Ireland

Turas (Irish for "journey") is an Irish-language project which is part of East Belfast Mission, in Belfast, Northern Ireland. Beginning as a grassroots effort, spearheaded primarily by Linda Ervine, Turas aims to promote the language particularly in the Protestant Unionist community. Historically, the Irish language was more closely associated with Irish Catholic identity.

Turas was first established in 2011 with a single Irish-language class held on the Newtownards Road. Today, the project caters to approximately 200 learners and is considered the largest provider of Irish-language classes in Belfast. Turas has received many accolades for its cross-community work. In 2015, after awarding Linda with the Civic Leadership Award, Community Relations Council chairman Peter Osborne stated that Turas' success was a "testament to Linda’s vision, bravery and leadership."

== History ==
Linda Ervine, sister-in-law of the late Progressive Unionist Party leader David Ervine, participated in a six-week Irish-language course in early 2011 as a member of an East Belfast cross-community women's group. When an article published by the Belfast Telegraph prompted local interest in learning Irish, East Belfast Mission decided to host a 15-week Irish-language class in November 2011. In 2012, with funding from Foras na Gaeilge, East Belfast Mission was able to hire Ervine as Irish Language Development Officer. In 2014, further funding allowed for the allocation of a permanent space for Turas in the newly built Skainos Centre.

== Programme ==
Turas currently offers 12 Irish-language classes each week, with levels ranging from total beginners to GCSE. Some learners at Turas have since continued on with A-levels as well as diploma certificates. Cultural classes include singing, set dancing, and tin whistle. Turas also hosts plays, lectures, debates, film screenings, festivals, and trips to the Gaeltacht.

== Outreach ==
Ervine and Gordon McCoy (who has served as Education Officer at Turas since 2015) host outreach presentations and events about the 'hidden' heritage of Northern Ireland at local churches, clubs, libraries, schools, and community centres. McCoy is an expert on Irish-speaking Protestants, and runs a bus tour about the history of the language in East Belfast.

Ervine and McCoy have also encouraged and facilitated the development of Irish-language programmes throughout the greater Belfast area.

== Advocacy ==
The status of the Irish language has proved divisive in post-Good Friday Agreement Northern Ireland. As a representative of Turas, Linda Ervine has actively engaged with Unionist politicians, as well as members of the Orange Order, in order to promote the language. Ervine has been particularly vocal about her support for a standalone Irish Language Act.
