= David Rose (UK politician) =

Northern Irish unionist politician

General secretary of NI21
- In office 2013–2014
- Leader: Basil McCrea
- Preceded by: Office created
- Succeeded by: Adam Murray

Deputy leader of the Progressive Unionist Party
- In office 2002–2006
- Leader: David Ervine
- Preceded by: Office created
- Succeeded by: Andy Park

Personal details
- Born: County Down, Northern Ireland
- Party: NI21 (2013 - 2016)
- Other political affiliations: Progressive Unionist Party (until 2010)

David Rose is a Northern Irish unionist politician who was general secretary of NI21 from its foundation in 2013 to 2014. He was additionally deputy leader of the Progressive Unionist Party (PUP) from 2002 to 2006.

== Political career ==
Rose first came to prominence as a member of the Progressive Unionist Party (PUP). He stood unsuccessfully for the party for North Down Borough Council in the Holywood area at the 2001 local elections, then also failed to be elected for the North Down constituency at the 2003 Northern Ireland Assembly election. Despite this, he was elected as the party's deputy leader, serving under David Ervine.

In 2010, Rose resigned from the PUP, shortly after its leader, Dawn Purvis, had resigned, and following the murder of Bobby Moffett by the Ulster Volunteer Force, a paramilitary group with links with the party. In 2013, he played a leading role in the formation of a new unionist party, NI21, and was appointed as its first general secretary.

Rose has also served on a policing board, and has trained political parties in several countries. Outside politics, he worked as a schoolteacher.

Party political offices
Preceded by New position?	Deputy Leader of the Progressive Unionist Party; 2001–2006	Succeeded by Andy Park
Preceded by New position	General Secretary of NI21; 2013–2014	Succeeded by Adam Murray
