= Volunteer (Ulster loyalist) =

Title used by some Ulster loyalist organisations for their members

Volunteer, abbreviated Vol., is a title used by a number of Ulster loyalist paramilitary organisations to describe their members.

== Background ==
The first loyalist paramilitary group to emerge in the period of the Troubles was the Ulster Volunteer Force (UVF), which first appeared in 1966, led by Gusty Spence. The UVF saw itself as the direct continuation of the Ulster Volunteers of 1913 (which was also called the UVF), formed to resist Irish Home Rule.

== Modern usage in loyalism ==
The term is used by the modern UVF. It is also used by its youth wing, the Young Citizen Volunteers. Likewise, the Ulster Defence Association and Red Hand Commando refer to their members as volunteers. It is also found in the names of similar paramilitary groups like the Loyalist Volunteer Force, Orange Volunteers and now-defunct Ulster Protestant Volunteers.

== See also ==
- Volunteer (Irish republican)
