= Billy Spence =

Northern Irish loyalist paramilitary (c. 1924–1980)

William James Spence (c. 1924 – 27 February 1980) was a loyalist from Belfast, Northern Ireland.

A native of the Shankill Road area and married to Minnie, Spence was a leading figure in both Ulster Protestant Action and the Ulster Volunteer Force (UVF). His wider family were active in the UVF.

== Early life ==
Born in Belfast, Spence was the older brother of Gusty, later to become an even more prominent loyalist. He was the son of William Edward Spence, who was born in Whitehaven, England but raised in Belfast, and Isabella Hayes. In 1945, Billy Spence was critical of his younger brother's invitation to Paddy Devlin to play for the Old Lodge soccer team.

In keeping with the military tradition of the family, Spence served with the Royal Navy as a young man. He then worked in the Belfast Corporation's transport department as a timekeeper. In this role he served as a member of the Transport and General Workers' Union. He flirted with socialism and was sometimes critical of the refusal of the Ulster Unionist Party to run working class candidates in deprived areas.

== Ulster Protestant Action ==
In 1956, Spence was a founding member of the Ulster Protestant Action (UPA) executive, and was appointed as its chairman. Billy introduced Ian Paisley to his younger brother, In 1962, along with John McQuade, he joined the Ulster Unionist Party's Court ward branch, as part of an entryist campaign by UPA members, and was soon appointed as Jim Kilfedder's election agent. During the 1966 general election, Paisley said that Kilfedder had links with Fine Gael, and Spence blamed this for the loss of the Belfast West seat to the Republican Labour Party's Gerry Fitt. Spence also served as secretary of the West Belfast Imperial Unionist Association.

== Ulster Volunteer Force ==
By 1966, the UPA was defunct, and Spence gathered a group of militant loyalists, including his brother, many of whom were former UPA members. They formed the Ulster Volunteer Force (UVF), led by Gusty Spence, although the Royal Ulster Constabulary believed that Billy was the chief organiser. They believed that he formulated a "false flag" strategy for the group, arranging bombings and gun attacks which would appear to be the work of the Irish Republican Army. According to Billy Hutchinson, Spence also played a vital role in helping him develop a Young Citizen Volunteers recruitment strategy.

Gusty was imprisoned after being convicted of murder, but escaped in 1972. Billy was one of 59 men on the Shankill arrested soon after this, and police initially claimed that they had recaptured Gusty. However, they subsequently announced that this was a case of mistaken identity, and that they had mistaken Billy for his brother.

== Later years ==
Although Billy subsequently took a low-profile role in the UVF, he remained involved for several more years. He contacted Ulster Unionist leader Jim Molyneaux and also Enoch Powell on several matters of interest to the group in the late 1970s. In particular Spence and his son Eddie kept up a letter writing campaign aimed at getting Gusty Spence released from prison following his conversion to political methods. Amongst those to raise the issue having received correspondence were Ian Paisley, Jim Kilfedder, Peter Robinson, Harold McCusker, Oliver Napier and Mairead Corrigan.

Billy Spence died in March 1980, seven months before the death of his younger brother Bobby, also a UVF member.
