= Norman Agnew =

Northern Ireland politician

Member of the Northern Ireland Assembly for Belfast East
- In office 1973–1974

Personal details
- Born: April 1905 Belfast, Ireland
- Died: 1993 (aged 87–88) Northern Ireland
- Party: Unionist Party of Northern Ireland (from 1974); Ulster Unionist Party (until 1974)
- Education: Queen's University Belfast; Trinity College Dublin

Norman Agnew (April 1905 –1993) was a Northern Irish unionist politician.

== Background ==
Born in Belfast, Agnew studied at Belfast Municipal College of Technology, Queen's University Belfast and Trinity College Dublin. He began working as a draughtsman aged 15, but soon moved into management, then, in 1933, to the Ministry of Finance, and in 1946 to the Belfast Corporation. At the Corporation, he initially worked in estates, but then for the city's Water Commissioners, of whom he was Secretary from 1952 to 1973. He was also a Fellow of the Royal Society of Health.

On retirement, Agnew stood for the Ulster Unionist Party in the Northern Ireland Assembly election in 1973, and was elected in Belfast East. In 1975, he stood for the Northern Ireland Constitutional Convention, on this occasion for the Unionist Party of Northern Ireland, but was not successful. He also stood in the Westminster seat of Belfast East at the 1979 UK general election, but took fourth place, with only 4% of the votes cast.

Northern Ireland Assembly (1973)
New assembly	Assembly Member for Belfast East; 1973–1974	Assembly abolished
