= Gusty Spence =

Ulster loyalist (1933–2011)

- Spence in 1972, while at large from prison
- Born: Augustus Andrew Spence; 28 June 1933; Belfast, Northern Ireland
- Died: 25 September 2011 (aged 78); Belfast, Northern Ireland
- Occupations: Shipyard worker, Royal Irish Rifles soldier, PUP politician
- Years active: 1959–2007
- Organisation: Ulster Volunteer Force
- Known for: Paramilitarism
- Political party: Progressive Unionist Party
- Movement: Ulster loyalism
- Criminal charge: Murder
- Criminal penalty: Life imprisonment
- Criminal status: Deceased
- Spouse: Louie Donaldson (m. 1953; died 2003)
- Children: 3
- Relatives: Billy Spence (brother), Frankie Curry (nephew), Winston Churchill Rea (son-in-law)

Augustus Andrew Spence (28 June 1933 – 25 September 2011) was a Northern Irish Ulster loyalist, politician, and militant who was the leader of the paramilitary Ulster Volunteer Force (UVF). One of the first UVF members to be convicted of murder, Spence was a senior figure in the organisation for over a decade.

During his time in prison Spence renounced violence and helped to convince a number of fellow inmates that the future of the UVF lay in a more political approach. Spence joined the Progressive Unionist Party (PUP), becoming a leading figure in the group. As a PUP representative he took a principal role in delivering the loyalist ceasefires of 1994.

== Early years ==
Spence was born and raised in the Shankill Road area of West Belfast in Northern Ireland, the son of William Edward Spence, who had been born in Whitehaven in Cumberland in the north-west of England; Spence Snr was raised in the Tiger's Bay area of north Belfast before later moving to the Shankill. Spence Snr had been a member of the Ulster Volunteers and had fought in the First World War. He married Isabella "Bella" Hayes, Gusty Spence's mother, in 1919. Spence was the sixth of seven children. The family home was 66 Joseph Street in an area of the lower Shankill known colloquially as "the Hammer". He was educated at the Riddel School on Malvern Street and the Hemsworth Square school, finishing his education aged fourteen. He was also a member of the Church Lads' Brigade, a Church of Ireland group and the Junior Orange Order. His family had a long tradition of Orange Order membership.

Spence took various manual jobs in the area until joining the British Army in 1957 as a member of the Royal Ulster Rifles. He rose to the rank of Provost Sergeant (battalion police). Spence served until 1961 when ill-health forced him to leave. He had been stationed in Cyprus and saw action fighting against the forces of Colonel Georgios Grivas. Spence then found employment at the Harland & Wolff shipyard in Belfast, where he worked as a stager (builder of the scaffolding in which the ships are constructed), a skilled job that commanded respect amongst working class Protestants and ensured for Spence a higher status within the Shankill.

From an early age Spence was a member of the Prince Albert Temperance Loyal Orange Lodge, where fellow members included John McQuade. He was also a member of the Royal Black Institution and the Apprentice Boys of Derry. Due to his later involvement in a murder, Spence was expelled from the Orange Order and the Royal Black Institution. The Reverend Martin Smyth was influential in Spence' being thrown out the Orange Order.

== Involvement with loyalism ==
His older brother Billy Spence was a founding member of Ulster Protestant Action (UPA) in 1956 and Gusty Spence himself was also a member of the group. He was frequently involved in street fights with republicans and garnered a reputation as a "hard man". He was also associated loosely with prominent loyalists such as Ian Paisley and Desmond Boal and was advised by both men in 1959 when he launched a protest against Gerry Fitt at Belfast City Hall after Fitt had described Spence's regiment as "murderers" over allegations that they had killed civilians in Cyprus. Spence, along with other Shankill Road loyalists, broke from Paisley in 1965 when they sided with Jim Kilfedder in a row that followed the latter's campaigns in Belfast West. Paisley had intimated that Kilfedder, a rival for the leadership of dissident unionism, was close to Fine Gael after learning that he had attended party meetings while a student at Trinity College Dublin. The Shankill loyalists supported Kilfedder and following his election as MP sent a letter to Paisley accusing him of treachery during the entire affair.

=== Ulster Volunteer Force ===
Spence claimed that he was approached in 1965 by two men, one of whom was an Ulster Unionist Party MP, who told him that the Ulster Volunteer Force was to be re-established and that he was to have responsibility for the Shankill. He was sworn in soon afterwards in a ceremony held in secret near Pomeroy, County Tyrone. Because of his military experience, Spence was chosen as the military commander and public face of the UVF when the group was established. However, RUC Special Branch believed that his brother Billy, who kept a much lower public profile, was the real leader of the group. Whatever the truth of this intelligence, Gusty Spence's Shankill UVF team was made up of only around 12 men on its formation. Their base of operations was the Standard Bar, a pub on the Shankill Road frequented by Spence and his allies (it was normal practice for UVF "teams" to be based at a single pub that its members used socially).

On 7 May 1966, a group of UVF men led by Spence petrol bombed a Catholic-owned pub on the Shankill Road. Fire also engulfed the house next door, killing the elderly Protestant widow, Matilda Gould (77), who lived there. On 27 May, Spence ordered four UVF men to kill an Irish Republican Army (IRA) member, Leo Martin, who lived on the Falls Road. Unable to find their target, the men drove around in search of any Catholic instead. They shot dead John Scullion (28), a Catholic civilian, as he walked home. Spence later wrote "at the time, the attitude was that if you couldn't get an IRA man you should shoot a Taig, he's your last resort". On 26 June, the same gang shot dead Catholic civilian Peter Ward (18) and wounded two others as they left a pub on Malvern Street in the lower Shankill. Two days later, the government of Northern Ireland used the Special Powers Act to declare the UVF illegal. Shortly after, Spence and three others were arrested.

In October 1966, Spence was sentenced to life imprisonment for the murder of Ward, although Spence has always claimed he was innocent. He was sent to Crumlin Road Prison. During its 12 July 1967 march, the Orange lodge to which he belonged stopped outside the prison in tribute to him. This occurred despite Spence having been officially expelled from the Orange Order following his conviction. Spence's involvement in the killings gave him legendary status among many young loyalists and he was claimed as an inspiration by the likes of Michael Stone. Tim Pat Coogan has described Spence as a "loyalist folk hero". The murder of Ward was, however, repudiated by Paisley and condemned in his Protestant Telegraph, sealing the split between the two.

== Prison ==
Spence appealed against his conviction and was the subject of a release petition organised by the Ulster Constitution Defence Committee, although nothing came of either initiative. Despite the fact that control of the UVF lay (nominally at least) with Spence's closest ally Samuel "Bo" McClelland, from prison Spence was often at odds with the group's leadership, in particular with regards to the 1971 McGurk's Bar bombing. Spence now argued that UVF members were soldiers and soldiers should not kill civilians, as had been the case at McGurk's Bar. Spence respected some Irish republican paramilitaries, who he felt also lived as soldiers, and to this end he wrote a sympathetic letter to the widow of Official IRA leader Joe McCann after he was killed in 1972.

=== Fugitive ===
Spence was granted two days leave around in early July 1972 to attend the wedding of his daughter Elizabeth to Winston Churchill "Winkie" Rea. The latter had formally asked Spence for his daughter's hand in marriage during a prison visit. Met by two members of the Red Hand Commando upon his release, Spence was informed of the need for a restructuring within the UVF and told not to return to prison. He initially refused and went on to attend his daughter's wedding. Afterwards a plot was concocted where his nephew Frankie Curry, a Red Hand Commando member, would drive Spence back to jail but the car would be stopped and Spence "kidnapped". As arranged, the car in which Spence was a passenger was stopped in Springmartin and Spence was taken away by UVF members. He remained at large for four months and during that time even gave an interview to ITV's World in Action in which he called for the UVF to take an increased role in the Northern Ireland conflict against the Provisional IRA. At the same time, he distanced himself from any policy of random murders of Catholics. Spence also took on responsibility for the restructuring, returning the UVF to the same command structure and organisational base that Edward Carson had utilised for the original UVF, with brigades, battalions, companies, platoons and sections. He also directed a significant restocking of the group's arsenal, with guns mostly taken from the security forces. Spence gave his permission for UVF brigadier Billy Hanna to establish the UVF's Mid-Ulster Brigade in Lurgan. His fugitive status earned him the short-lived nickname the "Orange Pimpernel". Spence was arrested along with around thirty other men at a UVF drinking club in Brennan Street, but after giving a false name, he was released.

Spence's time on the outside came to an end on 4 November when he was captured by Colonel Derek Wilford of the Parachute Regiment, who identified Spence by tattoos on his hands. He was returned to Crumlin Road jail soon afterwards, where he shared a cell with William "Plum" Smith, one of the Red Hand Commandos whom he had met upon his initial release and who had since been jailed for attempted murder.

== Move to politics ==
Spence soon became the UVF commander within the Maze Prison. He ran his part of the Maze along military lines, drilling inmates and training them in weapons use while also expecting a maintenance of discipline. As the loyalist Maze commander, Spence initially also had jurisdiction over the imprisoned members of the Ulster Defence Association (UDA), although this came to an end in 1973 when, following a deterioration in relations between the two groups outside the prison walls, James Craig became the UDA's Maze commander. By this time Spence polarised opinion within the UVF, with some members fiercely loyal to a man they saw as a folk hero and others resenting his draconian leadership and increasing emphasis on politics, with one anonymous member even labelling him "a cunt in a cravat".

Spence began to move towards a position of using political means to advance one's aims, and he persuaded the UVF leadership to declare a temporary ceasefire in 1973. Following Merlyn Rees' decision to legalise the UVF in 1974, Spence encouraged them to enter politics and supported the establishment of the Volunteer Political Party. However, Spence's ideas were abandoned as the UVF ceasefire fell apart that same year following the Ulster Workers' Council strike and the Dublin and Monaghan bombings; the carnage of the latter had shocked and horrified Spence. Furthermore, the VPP suffered a heavy defeat in West Belfast in the October 1974 general election, when the DUP candidate John McQuade captured six times as many votes as the VPP's Ken Gibson.

Spence was increasingly disillusioned with the UVF and he imparted these views to fellow inmates at Long Kesh. According to Billy Mitchell, Spence quizzed him and others sent to the Maze about why they were there, seeking an ideological answer to his question. When the prisoner was unable to provide one, Spence would then seek to convince them of the wisdom of his more politicised path, something that he accomplished with Mitchell. David Ervine and Billy Hutchinson were among the other UVF men imprisoned in the mid-1970s to become disciples of Spence. In 1977, he publicly condemned the use of violence for political gain, on the grounds that it was counter-productive. In 1978, Spence left the UVF altogether. His brother Bobby, also a UVF member, died in October 1980 inside the Maze, a few months after the death of their brother Billy.

=== PUP activity ===
Released from prison in 1984, Spence soon became a leading member of the UVF-linked Progressive Unionist Party (PUP) and a central figure in the Northern Ireland peace process. He initially worked solely for the PUP but after a spell also set up the Shankill Activity Centre, a government-supported scheme to provide training and leisure opportunities for unemployed youths.

He was entrusted by the Combined Loyalist Military Command (CLMC) to read out their 13 October 1994 statement that announced the loyalist ceasefire. Flanked by his PUP colleagues Jim McDonald and William Plum Smith, as well as Ulster Democratic Party members Gary McMichael, John White and Davy Adams, Spence read out the statement from Fernhill, a former Cunningham family home on their former Glencairn estate in Belfast's Glencairn area. This building had been an important training centre for members of Edward Carson's original UVF. A few days after the announcement, Spence made a trip to the United States along with the PUP's David Ervine and Billy Hutchinson and the UDP's McMichael, Adams and Joe English. Among their engagements was one as guests of honour of the National Committee on American Foreign Policy. Spence went on to become a leading advocate for the Good Friday Agreement.

In August 2000, Spence was caught up in moves by Johnny Adair's "C" Company of the UDA to take control of the Shankill by forcing out the UVF and other opponents. Adair's men forced their way into Spence's Shankill home but found it empty, as Spence tended to spend much of the summer at a caravan he owned in Groomsport. Nonetheless, they ransacked the house and stole Spence's army medals, while the Spence family were forced to stay off the Shankill for the entirety of the loyalist feud. When Spence's wife died three years later, he said that C Company had been responsible for her death, such was the toll that the events had taken on her health.

On 3 May 2007, Spence read out the statement by the UVF announcing that it would keep its weapons but put them beyond the reach of ordinary members. The statement also included a warning that nationalist activities could "provoke another generation of loyalists toward armed resistance".

== Personal life ==
Spence married Louie Donaldson, a native of the city's Grosvenor Road, on 20 June 1953 at Wellwood Street Mission, Sandy Row. The couple had three daughters, Spence, a talented footballer in his youth with Old Lodge F.C., was a lifelong supporter of Linfield F.C.

=== Death ===
Spence died on 25 September 2011, aged 78, in a Belfast hospital; he had been suffering from a long-term illness and was admitted to hospital 12 days prior to his death. Spence was praised by, among others, PUP leader Brian Ervine, who stated that "his contribution to the peace is incalculable". Sinn Féin's Gerry Kelly claimed that while Spence had been central to the development of loyalist paramilitarism, "he will also be remembered as a major influence in drawing loyalism away from sectarian strife".

However, a granddaughter of Matilda Gould, a 74-year-old Protestant widow who had died from burns sustained in the UVF's attempted bombing of a Catholic bar next door to her home, objected to Spence being called a "peacemaker" and described him as a "bad evil man". The unnamed woman stated, "When you go out and throw a petrol bomb through a widow's window, you're no peacemaker."

His funeral service was held in St Michael's Church of Ireland on the Shankill Road. Notable mourners included Unionist politicians Dawn Purvis, Mike Nesbitt, Michael McGimpsey, Hugh Smyth and Brian Ervine, UVF chief John "Bunter" Graham and UDA South Belfast brigadier Jackie McDonald. In accordance with Spence's wishes, there were no paramilitary trappings at the funeral or reference to his time in the UVF. Instead his coffin was adorned with the beret and regimental flag of the Royal Ulster Rifles, his former regiment. He was buried in Bangor.
