= Brian Ervine =

Northern Irish playwright, songwriter, teacher and Ulster loyalist politician

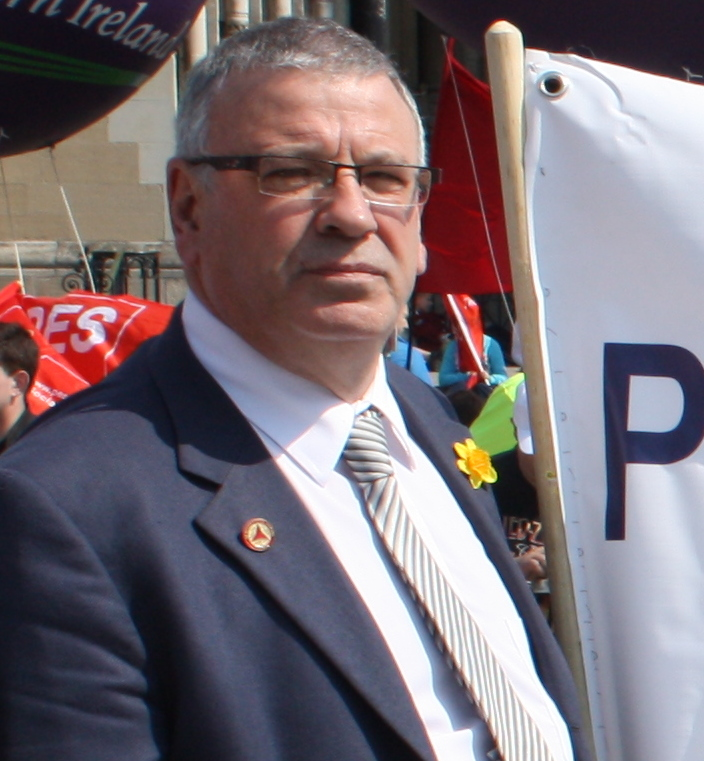
- Ervine in 2011

Leader of the Progressive Unionist Party
- In office 16 October 2010 – 2 June 2011
- Deputy: Nigel Gardiner
- Preceded by: Dawn Purvis; John Kyle (Interim)
- Succeeded by: Hugh Smyth (Interim); Billy Hutchinson

Personal details
- Born: October 1951 (age 75) Belfast, Northern Ireland
- Party: Progressive Unionist Party
- Spouse: Linda Ervine

Brian Ervine (born October 1951) is a Northern Irish playwright, songwriter, teacher and former Ulster loyalist politician, based in Belfast. The Northern Irish playwright St John Ervine (1883–1971) was a distant relative. As a politician, he served as leader of the Progressive Unionist Party (PUP) from 2010 to 2011, having succeeded Dawn Purvis. Ervine's wife, Linda, serves as the Irish Language Officer at Turas, an Irish-language programme notable for its location in east Belfast.

== Biography ==
He was educated at Grosvenor Grammar School, Belfast, He studied at Stranmillis University College, graduating with a degree in education, and then at Queen's University, Belfast, graduating with a degree in Theology (BD). He subsequently taught English and Religion at Orangefield High School in east Belfast. Alumni of Orangefield include Van Morrison, Brian Keenan and Ervine's brother, David.

His play, Somme Day Mourning, tells the story of working class east Belfast men who gave their lives at the battle of The Somme in 1916. The play also features original music and lyrics written by Ervine.

In 2005, at a special céilí in the Great Hall of Parliament Buildings at Stormont, hosted by Tommy Sands of Downtown Radio, David Ervine sang "Leaving Dalriada", an emotive ballad written by Brian Ervine, about an exile ordered to leave the country by a gunman. Brian Ervine presented "Dalriada", a local radio programme focused on Ulster-Scots culture.

=== Political career ===
When his brother, David Ervine, leader of the Progressive Unionist Party, died in 2007, Brian Ervine stood for the leadership of the party. He lost to Dawn Purvis.

At his brother David's funeral, Ervine was pictured in the international media standing next to his brother's widow, Jeanette Ervine, while she was embraced by the president of Sinn Féin, Gerry Adams. In his address to mourners at the funeral, Brian Ervine said his brother was able to "translate the bloodstained tragic prose of violence and hatred to the poetry of peaceful co-existence . . . He had the guts and the courage to climb out of the traditional trenches, meet the enemy in no-man's land and play ball with him."

In October 2010, Ervine was elected leader of the PUP. He unsuccessfully stood in Belfast East at the 2011 Northern Ireland Assembly election, where he was eliminated on the tenth count with 1,493 first-preference votes (4.62%).
