= Judith Cochrane =

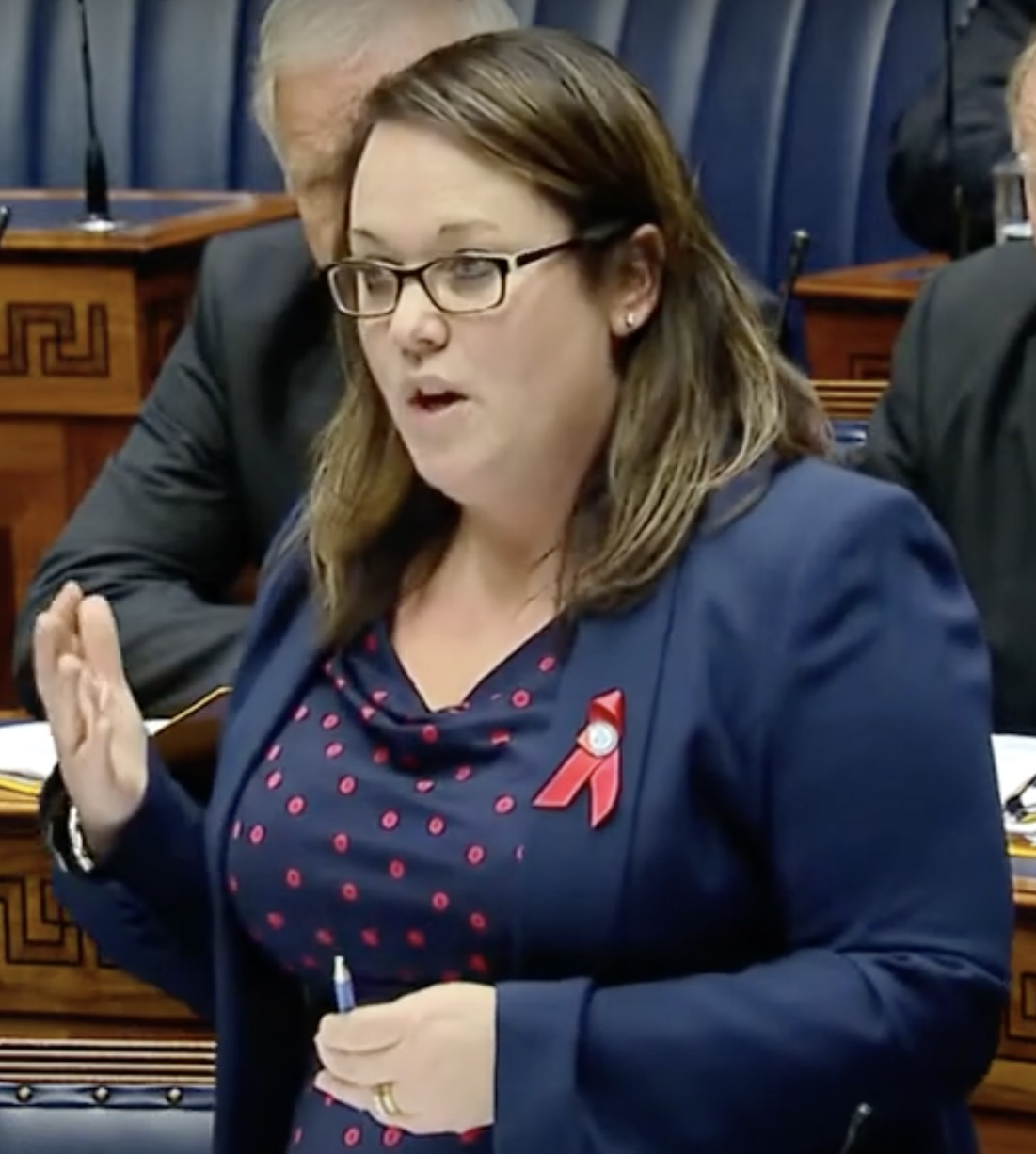

Member of the Northern Ireland Assembly for Belfast East
- In office 5 May 2011 – 5 May 2016
- Preceded by: Dawn Purvis
- Succeeded by: Naomi Long

Member of Castlereagh Borough Council
- In office 5 May 2005 – 22 May 2014
- Preceded by: Peter Osborne
- Succeeded by: Council abolished
- Constituency: Castlereagh East

Personal details
- Born: 31 October 1975 (age 50) Bloomfield, Belfast, Northern Ireland
- Party: Alliance
- Spouse: Jonny Cochrane
- Children: 2
- Education: Robert Gordon University; Queen's University Belfast
- Occupation: Politician
- Profession: Management consultant
- Website: MLA website

Judith Cochrane (born 31 October 1975) is an Alliance Party politician from Northern Ireland who was a member of Northern Ireland Assembly for the East Belfast constituency from 2011 to 2016.

== Early life ==
Cochrane is a lifelong resident of East Belfast, having been born and raised in Bloomfield and educated at Strandtown Primary School and Methodist College Belfast. After earning her Bachelor's in Nutrition at Robert Gordon University, Aberdeen, she returned to Belfast to complete her Master's in Business Administration at Queen's University, Belfast.

== Electoral history ==
Prior to her election as MLA, Cochrane served as a Councillor on Castlereagh Borough Council between 2005 and 2011 and worked in the Department for Social Development and as a Management Consultant for SMEs in Northern Ireland.

During her term at Stormont, Cochrane sat on the Finance and Personnel Committee and was a member of the Assembly Commission. She founded the All Party Group on SMEs and was a member of the All Party Group on Cancer, the All Party Group on Tourism, and the All Party Group on Rugby, which she co-founded and served on as vice chair.

She was also the present Chairperson of the Northern Ireland Assembly and Business Trust.

In addition to her duties at Stormont, Cochrane ran her own constituency office on the Upper Newtownards Road in Ballyhackamore.

Cochrane chose not to seek reelection, and stood down ahead of the Northern Ireland Assembly election in 2016, Former MLA and MP for East Belfast Naomi Long replaced her on the ballot.

== Personal life ==
Cochrane is married to Jonathan with whom she has two children. The family reside in East Belfast and actively attend Bloomfield Presbyterian Church.

Northern Ireland Assembly
Preceded by Dawn Purvis	MLA for East Belfast; 2011–2016	Succeeded by Naomi Long
