= Belfast East (Assembly constituency) =

Constituency in the Northern Ireland Assembly

Coordinates: 54°36′00″N 5°51′53″W

- Constituency for the Northern Ireland Assembly
- East Belfast shown within Northern Ireland

Current Constituency
- Created: 1973
- Seats: 6 (1998–2016); 5 (2017–)
- MLAs: Andy Allen (UUP); David Brooks (DUP); Joanne Bunting (DUP); Naomi Long (APNI); Peter McReynolds (APNI)
- City council: Belfast City Council

Belfast East is a constituency in the Northern Ireland Assembly.

The seat was first used for a Northern Ireland-only election for the Northern Ireland Assembly, 1973. It usually shares boundaries with the Belfast East UK Parliament constituency, however the boundaries of the two constituencies were slightly different from 1983 to 1986 and 2010 to 2011 as the Assembly boundaries had not caught up with Parliamentary boundary changes and from 1996 to 1997 when members of the Northern Ireland Forum had been elected from the newly drawn Parliamentary constituencies but the 51st Parliament of the United Kingdom, elected in 1992 under the 1983–95 constituency boundaries, was still in session.

Members were then elected from the constituency to the 1975 Constitutional Convention, the 1982 Assembly, the 1996 Forum and then to the current Assembly from 1998.

For further details of the history and boundaries of the constituency, see Belfast East (UK Parliament constituency).

== Members ==
Election	MLA (party)	MLA (party)	MLA (party)	MLA (party)	MLA (party)	MLA (party)
1973	Oliver Napier (Alliance Party)	David Bleakley (Labour)	Joshua Cardwell (UUP/UPNI)	Norman Agnew (UUP)	Roy Bradford (UUP)	Eileen Paisley (DUP)
1975	Oliver Napier (Alliance Party)	David Bleakley (Labour)	Joshua Cardwell (UUP/UPNI)	Reg Empey (Vanguard)	William Craig (Vanguard)	Eileen Paisley (DUP)
1982	Oliver Napier (Alliance Party)	Addie Morrow (Alliance Party)	Dorothy Dunlop (UUP)	Jeremy Burchill (UUP)	Denny Vitty (DUP)	Peter Robinson (DUP)
1996	John Alderdice (Alliance Party)	5 seats 1996–1998	Reg Empey (UUP)	Jim Rodgers (UUP)	Sammy Wilson (DUP)	Peter Robinson (DUP)
1998	John Alderdice (Alliance Party)	David Ervine (PUP)	Reg Empey (UUP)	Ian Adamson (UUP)	Sammy Wilson (DUP)	Peter Robinson (DUP)
2003	Naomi Long (Alliance Party)	David Ervine (PUP)	Reg Empey (UUP)	Michael Copeland (UUP)	Robin Newton (DUP)	Peter Robinson (DUP)
January 2007 co-option	Naomi Long (Alliance Party)	Dawn Purvis (PUP)	Reg Empey (UUP)	Michael Copeland (UUP)	Robin Newton (DUP)	Peter Robinson (DUP)
2007	Naomi Long (Alliance Party)	Dawn Purvis (PUP)	Reg Empey (UUP)	Wallace Browne (DUP)	Robin Newton (DUP)	Peter Robinson (DUP)
July 2010 co-option	Chris Lyttle (Alliance Party)	Dawn Purvis (PUP)	Reg Empey (UUP)	Wallace Browne (DUP)	Robin Newton (DUP)	Peter Robinson (DUP)
2011	Chris Lyttle (Alliance Party)	Judith Cochrane (Alliance Party)	Michael Copeland (UUP)	Sammy Douglas (DUP)	Robin Newton (DUP)	Peter Robinson (DUP)
September 2015 co-option	Chris Lyttle (Alliance Party)	Judith Cochrane (Alliance Party)	Andy Allen (UUP)	Sammy Douglas (DUP)	Robin Newton (DUP)	Peter Robinson (DUP)
2016	Chris Lyttle (Alliance Party)	Naomi Long (Alliance Party)	Andy Allen (UUP)	Sammy Douglas (DUP)	Robin Newton (DUP)	Joanne Bunting (DUP)
2017	Chris Lyttle (Alliance Party)	Naomi Long (Alliance Party)	Andy Allen (UUP)	5 seats 2017–present	Robin Newton (DUP)	Joanne Bunting (DUP)
July 2019 co-option	Chris Lyttle (Alliance Party)	Máire Hendron (Alliance Party)	Andy Allen (UUP)	5 seats 2017–present	Robin Newton (DUP)	Joanne Bunting (DUP)
January 2020 co-option	Chris Lyttle (Alliance Party)	Naomi Long (Alliance Party)	Andy Allen (UUP)	5 seats 2017–present	Robin Newton (DUP)	Joanne Bunting (DUP)
2022	Peter McReynolds (Alliance Party)	Naomi Long (Alliance Party)	Andy Allen (UUP)	5 seats 2017–present	David Brooks (DUP)	Joanne Bunting (DUP)

Note: The columns in this table are used only for presentational purposes, and no significance should be attached to the order of columns. For details of the order in which seats were won at each election, see the detailed results of that election.

== Elections ==
=== Northern Ireland Assembly ===
==== 2027 ====
2027 Assembly election: Belfast East – 5 seats
Party	Candidate	FPv%	Count
Party	Candidate	FPv%	1
UUP	Andy Allen		
SDLP	David McGreevy		
Green (NI)	Brian Smyth		

==== 2022 ====
2022 Assembly election: Belfast East – 5 seats
Party	Candidate	FPv%	Count										
Party	Candidate	FPv%	1	2	3	4	5	6	7	8	9	10	11
Alliance	**Naomi Long**	18.95%	**8,195**										
DUP	**Joanne Bunting**	16.77%	**7,253**										
Alliance	**Peter McReynolds**	13.46%	5,820	6,611	6,624	6,624	6,812	6,956	6,974	7,072	**7,414**		
DUP	**David Brooks**	15.34%	6,633	6,646	6,646	6,646	6,656	6,666	6,995	7,078	7,091	7,092	**8,961**
UUP	**Andy Allen**	12.21%	5,281	5,315	5,318	5,318	5,346	5,374	5,638	6,691	6,707	6,718	**7,629**
Green (NI)	Brian Smyth	5.32%	2,302	2,360	2,375	2,375	2,488	2,761	2,787	2,839	3,393	3,578	3,640
TUV	John Ross	7.14%	3,087	3,091	3,092	3,092	3,095	3,108	3,354	3,416	3,425	3,426	
Sinn Féin	Mairéad O'Donnell	3.17%	1,369	1,385	1,390	1,390	1,463	1,501	1,504	1,509			
UUP	Lauren Kerr	2.96%	1,282	1,298	1,299	1,299	1,325	1,340	1,406				
PUP	Karl Bennett	2.24%	970	973	974	974	976	992					
People Before Profit	Hannah Kenny	1.16%	500	510	534	534	577						
SDLP	Charlotte Carson	1.12%	484	507	517	517							
Workers' Party	Eoin MacNeill	0.17%	72	76									
Electorate: 70,123 Valid: 43,248 (61.67%) Spoilt: 592 Quota: 7,209 Turnout: 43,840 (62.52%)

==== 2017 ====
2017 Assembly election: Belfast East – 5 seats
Party	Candidate	FPv%	Count										
Party	Candidate	FPv%	1	2	3	4	5	6	7	8	9	10	11
Alliance	**Naomi Long**	18.64%	**7,610**										
Alliance	**Chris Lyttle**	12.54%	5,059	5,760.03	5,780.25	5,885.86	6,032.81	6,072.14	6,367.87	**7,268.87**			
UUP	**Andy Allen**	13.07%	5,275	5,313.17	5,323.39	5,356.6	5,498.59	5,767.92	5,783.14	6,048.62	**7,257.62**		
DUP	**Joanne Bunting**	14.88%	6,007	6,016.02	6,021.02	6,026.13	6,057.35	6,217.46	6,228.46	6,275.01	**6,759.01**		
DUP	**Robin Newton**	11.72%	4,729	4,734.5	4,736.5	4,739.5	4,774.5	4,862.61	4,865.61	4,890.72	5,268.26	5,333.26	**5,541.65**
DUP	David Douglas	10.98%	4,431	4,435.18	4,436.18	4,440.18	4,455.4	4,568.4	4,572.4	4,599.73	4,995.25	5,093.25	5,410.84
PUP	John Kyle	6.59%	2,658	2,673.29	2,678.51	2,685.73	2,751.95	2,936.28	2,950.28	3,148.79			
Green (NI)	Georgina Milne	3.59%	1,447	1,474.06	1,500.28	1,539.49	1,763.36	1,801.58	2,080.65				
Sinn Féin	Mairéad O'Donnell	2.91%	1,173	1,183.34	1,185.45	1,216.66	1,232.88	1,235.1					
TUV	Andrew Girvin	2.27%	917	918.65	920.65	924.76	958.87						
Labour Alternative	Courtney Robinson	1.10%	442	449.48	456.48	467.81							
NI Conservatives	Sheila Bodel	0.68%	275	276.32	278.43	280.43							
SDLP	Séamas de Faoite	0.62%	250	260.45	260.56								
Independent	Jordy McKeag	0.21%	84	85.43									
Electorate: 64,788 Valid: 40,357 (62.29%) Spoilt: 471 Quota: 6,727 Turnout: 40,828 (63.02%)

==== 2016 ====
2016 Assembly election: Belfast East – 6 seats
Party	Candidate	FPv%	Count												
Party	Candidate	FPv%	1	2	3	4	5	6	7	8	9	10	11	12	13
DUP	**Joanne Bunting**	14.90%	**5,538**												
Alliance	**Naomi Long**	14.75%	**5,482**												
DUP	**Sammy Douglas**	11.38%	4,230	4,401.52	4,409	4,411.19	4,436.26	4,456.29	4,572.61	4,574.61	4,756.52	4,978.16	5,045.16	**5,461.16**	
UUP	**Andy Allen**	8.20%	3,047	3,057.28	3,065.28	3,069.57	3,176.72	3,201.81	3,283.15	3,286.15	3,520.59	3,777.94	4,756.53	**5,332.53**	
Alliance	**Chris Lyttle**	7.55%	2,805	2,805.92	2,858.92	2,975.71	3,033.23	3,109.04	3,127.19	3,231.58	3,252.64	3,279.82	3,318.36	3,500.9	**5,685.9**
DUP	**Robin Newton**	10.42%	3,875	3,896.88	3,900.04	3,902.5	3,938.62	3,946.62	3,995.82	3,998.85	4,105.28	4,182.55	4,267.83	4,745.5	**4,812.54**
Green (NI)	Ross Brown	5.87%	2,183	2,184.4	2,222.4	2,233.29	2,283.49	2,497.23	2,559.32	2,893.95	2,935.15	3,018.46	3,050.84	3,293.25	3,487.69
Alliance	Tim Morrow	6.38%	2,372	2,372.36	2,390.36	2,404.97	2,431.07	2,469.25	2,478.41	2,526.56	2,533.56	2,538.56	2,568.07	2,636.62	
PUP	John Kyle	4.77%	1,772	1,776	1,786.04	1,788.65	1,788.71	1,816.77	1,928.95	1,938.95	2,082.3	2,485.62	2,533.87		
UUP	Chris McGimpsey	2.95%	1,095	1,098.24	1,102.24	1,104.67	1,165.73	1,178.77	1,211.87	1,214.87	1,305.13	1,346.15			
Independent	Maggie Hutton	2.96%	1,099	1,100.48	1,107.48	1,108.26	1,113.26	1,144.39	1,190.57	1,192.6	1,277.76				
TUV	Andrew Girvin	2.39%	887	889.72	891.72	891.99	907.03	911.03	1,037.14	1,037.14					
Sinn Féin	Niall Ó Donnghaile	2.54%	946	946	963	964.71	966.71	985.77	988.77						
UKIP	Jonny Lavery	1.70%	631	632.52	634.52	635.15	694.15	717.19							
Labour Alternative	Courtney Robinson	1.39%	517	517.2	546.2	548.57	556.57								
NI Conservatives	Neil Wilson	1.28%	477	477.36	482.36	483.5									
SDLP	Amy Doherty	0.38%	141	141.76											
NI Labour	Erskine Holmes	0.21%	78	78											
Electorate: 65,740 Valid: 37,175 (56.55%) Spoilt: 448 Quota: 5,311 Turnout: 37,623 (57.23%)

==== 2011 ====
2011 Assembly election: Belfast East – 6 seats
Party	Candidate	FPv%	Count										
Party	Candidate	FPv%	1	2	3	4	5	6	7	8	9	10	11
DUP	**Peter Robinson**	28.26%	**9,149**										
DUP	**Robin Newton**	7.53%	2,436	**4,800.5**									
Alliance	**Judith Cochrane**	13.38%	4,329	4,432	4,433.71	4,448.71	4,497.71	4,571.71	**4,754.71**				
Alliance	**Chris Lyttle**	12.93%	4,183	4,307	4,308.5	4,320	4,330.5	4,419.5	4,530	4,571.5	**4,695.5**		
DUP	**Sammy Douglas**	8.25%	2,668	3,683	3,808.94	3,819.53	3,831.03	3,892.24	3,941.13	4,052.69	4,077.69	4,455.11	**4,783.11**
UUP	**Michael Copeland**	6.78%	2,194	2,355	2,357.43	2,357.43	2,382.93	2,436.93	2,475.96	2,617.99	2,624.99	3,224.91	**3,723.34**
Independent	Dawn Purvis	5.26%	1,702	1,908.5	1,910.66	1,926.16	1,955.16	2,009.66	2,093.69	2,179.22	2,229.22	2,320.43	2,789.29
PUP	Brian Ervine	4.62%	1,493	1,666.5	1,669.62	1,671.12	1,680.62	1,761.12	1,786.62	1,872.65	1,884.15	1,963.3	
UUP	Philip Robinson	2.92%	943	1,130	1,131.41	1,139.44	1,142.47	1,160.5	1,188.5	1,294.03	1,296.03		
Sinn Féin	Niall Ó Donnghaile	3.18%	1,030	1,037	1,037.03	1,061.03	1,070.03	1,127.03	1,148.03	1,148.53			
TUV	Harry Toan	2.20%	712	744	744.36	745.89	753.39	801.39	824.39				
Green (NI)	Martin Gregg	1.77%	572	613.5	614.28	624.31	649.31	691.31					
BNP	Ann Cooper	1.04%	337	354.5	354.86	357.86	364.86						
SDLP	Magdalena Wolska	0.77%	250	253	253.06	270.06	275.06						
Socialist Party	Thomas Black	0.62%	201	205	205.03	217.03							
Workers' Party	Kevin McNally	0.32%	102	106.5	106.5								
Independent	Stephen Stewart	0.14%	46	53.5	53.77								
Electorate: 61,263 Valid: 32,347 (52.80%) Spoilt: 481 Quota: 4,622 Turnout: 32,828 (53.59%)

==== 2007 ====
2007 Assembly election: Belfast East – 6 seats
Party	Candidate	FPv%	Count									
Party	Candidate	FPv%	1	2	3	4	5	6	7	8	9	10
DUP	**Peter Robinson**	19.02%	**5,635**									
Alliance	**Naomi Long**	18.84%	**5,583**									
UUP	**Reg Empey**	13.97%	4,139	4,231.4	**4,620.4**							
PUP	**Dawn Purvis**	10.28%	3,045	3,113.88	3,307.63	3,336.13	3,403.11	3,455.86	3,611.83	3,654.32	3,842.92	**4,208.17**
DUP	**Wallace Browne**	10.75%	3,185	3,416.6	3,453.1	3,462.35	3,488.06	3,541.78	3,607.97	3,608.71	3,709.1	**3,734.32**
DUP	**Robin Newton**	7.88%	2,335	3,201.88	3,241.38	3,250.38	3,270.35	3,316.3	3,355.75	3,359.75	3,497.13	**3,516.62**
UUP	Michael Copeland	5.25%	1,557	1,567.08	1,654.58	1,817.33	1,834.83	1,951.08	2,068.32	2,073.82	2,743.06	2,999.31
SDLP	Mary Muldoon	2.75%	816	816.96	1,020.71	1,036.96	1,097.7	1,115.2	1,306.95	1,902.95	1,933.94	
UUP	Jim Rodgers	2.77%	820	884.08	971.08	1,078.08	1,104.55	1,191.03	1,280.77	1,284.27		
Sinn Féin	Niall Ó Donnghaile	3.56%	1,055	1,056.44	1,071.94	1,072.44	1,087.69	1,087.69	1,123.94			
Green (NI)	Steven Agnew	2.20%	653	658.04	852.04	870.29	983.78	1,064.28				
NI Conservatives	Glyn Chambers	1.44%	427	429.88	483.13	494.38	516.13					
Socialist Party	Thomas Black	0.75%	225	227.88	246.63	248.13						
Workers' Party	Joseph Bell	0.36%	107	107.96	118.46	118.96						
Make Politicians History	Rainbow George	0.16%	47	47.24	51.74	52.99						
Electorate: 49,757 Valid: 29,629 (59.55%) Spoilt: 244 Quota: 4,233 Turnout: 29,873 (60.04%)

==== 2003 ====
2003 Assembly election: Belfast East – 6 seats
Party	Candidate	FPv%	Count					
Party	Candidate	FPv%	1	2	3	4	5	6
DUP	**Peter Robinson**	29.89%	**9,254**					
UUP	**Reg Empey**	20.86%	**6,459**					
DUP	**Robin Newton**	4.76%	1,475	4,418.2	**4,444.24**			
PUP	**David Ervine**	9.66%	2,990	3,211.52	3,377.37	3,509.48	3,660.79	**4,263.39**
Alliance	**Naomi Long**	8.96%	2,774	2,794.28	2,877.36	3,010.67	4,012.01	**4,056.54**
UUP	**Michael Copeland**	7.40%	2,291	2,354.96	3,132.75	3,220.51	3,297.92	**3,650.49**
UUP	Jim Rodgers	4.85%	1,502	1,790.6	2,681.85	2,782.65	2,839.37	3,296.48
DUP	Harry Toan	4.53%	1,403	2,633.32	2,643.24	2,716.66	2,727.78	
Sinn Féin	Joseph O'Donnell	3.81%	1,180	1,184.16	1,185.71	1,205.71		
SDLP	Leo Van Es	3.12%	967	969.6	986.03	1,035.65		
NI Conservatives	Terence Dick	0.75%	232	234.08	250.51			
Socialist	Thomas Black	0.57%	176	181.2	183.68			
Workers' Party	Joseph Bell	0.40%	125	128.12	129.05			
Independent	John McBlain	0.23%	72	78.76	81.24			
Rainbow Dream Ticket	Rainbow George Weiss	0.21%	65	66.56	67.18			
Electorate: 51,937 Valid: 30,965 (59.62%) Spoilt: 559 Quota: 4,424 Turnout: 31,524 (60.70%)

==== 1998 ====
1998 Assembly election: Belfast East – 6 seats
Party	Candidate	FPv%	Count														
Party	Candidate	FPv%	1	2	3	4	5	6	7	8	9	10	11	12	13	14	15
DUP	**Peter Robinson**	28.34%	**11,219**														
Alliance	**John Alderdice**	15.52%	**6,144**														
PUP	**David Ervine**	12.92%	5,114	5,299	5,338.13	5,356.76	5,378.03	5,599.45	**5,693.45**								
UUP	**Reg Empey**	13.03%	5,158	5,288	5,324.54	5,327.82	5,369.38	5,371.88	5,421.9	5,497.4	5,590.95	5,592.65	5,625.79	**6,108.79**			
DUP	**Sammy Wilson**	1.60%	633	4,486	4,487.68	4,487.68	4,506.68	4,519.75	4,530.03	4,617.17	4,637.74	4,640.74	5,532.24	**5,711.24**			
UUP	**Ian Adamson**	8.71%	3,447	3,510	3,530.3	3,534.3	3,581.87	3,585.94	3,631.78	3,681.85	3,746.69	3,748.69	3,774.4	4,180.79	4,567.79	4,635.84	**5,414.76**
Alliance	Richard Good	2.53%	1,000	1,009.5	1,290.48	1,309.18	1,324.74	1,331.09	1,416.68	1,439.88	1,756.68	1,814.1	1,824.31	1,865.12	1,888.12	2,864.33	2,974.96
UK Unionist	Denny Vitty	3.44%	1,362	1,674	1,675.05	1,675.05	1,704.05	1,708.55	1,722.9	1,755.9	1,772.97	1,772.97	1,880.47	2,000.32	2,023.32	2,026.46	
SDLP	Peter Jones	2.59%	1,025	1,026.5	1,034.9	1,055.04	1,055.18	1,057.18	1,066.53	1,069.1	1,225.2	1,588.76	1,589.76	1,593.26	1,594.26		
UUP	Jim Rodgers	2.56%	1,015	1,189.5	1,194.54	1,195.54	1,212.18	1,221.18	1,238.46	1,285.38	1,313.45	1,315.52	1,349.16				
DUP	John Norris	0.94%	373	1,096.5	1,097.13	1,098.13	1,103.13	1,106.63	1,110.77	1,161.34	1,171.41	1,172.41					
Sinn Féin	Joseph O'Donnell	2.32%	917	917	918.19	929.4	929.47	929.47	936.54	937.54	951.68						
NI Women's Coalition	Pearl Sagar	1.80%	711	723	734.83	744.97	752.11	763.18	800.37	822.01							
Ulster Democratic	Robert Girvan	1.30%	516	565.5	567.04	568.04	569.61	578.68	590.39								
Labour Party NI	David Bleakley	0.93%	369	377	389.6	399.72	408.29	409.29									
PUP	Dawn Purvis	0.68%	271	286.5	287.41	289.48	289.55										
NI Conservatives	Lesley Donaldson	0.51%	203	221.5	224.37	226.87											
Workers' Party	Joseph Bell	0.20%	79	79.5	82.09												
Natural Law	David Collins	0.06%	22	22	22.49												
Independent	John Lawrence	0.04%	15	15	15.42												
Electorate: 60,562 Valid: 39,593 (65.38%) Spoilt: 763 Quota: 5,657 Turnout: 40,356 (66.64%)

=== 1996 forum ===
Successful candidates are shown in bold.

Party	Candidate(s)	Votes	Percentage
DUP	**Peter Robinson**; **Sammy Wilson**; Robin Newton; Irene Lewis; Wallace Browne	11,270	29.4
UUP	**Reg Empey**; **Jim Rodgers**; Ian Adamson; Alan Crowe	8,608	22.5
Alliance	**John Alderdice**; Peter Osborne; Danny Dow; Mervyn Jones; Maureen McConnell	7,130	18.6
PUP	David Ervine; Patricia Laverty; Rosemary Reynolds; John McQuillen; Alec Gordon	3,802	9.9
UK Unionist	Alan Field; Maureen Ann McCartney	2,496	6.5
SDLP	Peter Prendiville; Brian Heading	1,299	3.4
Ulster Democratic	Robert Girvan; Jacqueline Upton; Ronald Stitt; Samuel Walkingshaw; Joseph McMaster	1,156	3.1
Sinn Féin	Michael McVeigh; Brid Duffy; Anna Doherty	862	2.2
NI Women's Coalition	Felicity Huston; Pearl Sagar; Annie Quinn; Kate Campbell; Karen Snoddy	405	1.1
NI Conservatives	Ian Donaldson; Dorothy Dunlop	291	0.8
Labour coalition	Gail Haslett; Thomas Black; Barbara Hawites; David Bell; Maeve O'Leary	199	0.5
Democratic Partnership	David Bleakley; Edwin Sloan	197	0.5
Green (NI)	Similda Osoba; April McCarthy	161	0.4
Workers' Party	Joe Bell; Marie Mooney	149	0.4
Ulster Independence	Gavin Boyd; Mark Black; David McClinton	114	0.3
Independent DUP	Jean Toad; David Kerr	93	0.2
Democratic Left	Michael Craig; June Campion	45	0.1
Communist	Andrew Gibb; Sarah Stewart	38	0.1
Natural Law	Robert Johnstone; Richard Johnson; Ian Long	13	0.0
Independent Chambers	Ian Arbuthnot; Alan Hay	11	0.0

=== 1982 ===
1982 Assembly election: Belfast East – 6 seats
Party	Candidate	FPv%	Count									
Party	Candidate	FPv%	1	2	3	4	5	6	7	8	9	10
DUP	**Peter Robinson**	38.86%	**15,319**									
UUP	**Jeremy Burchill**	18.63%	**7,345**									
Alliance	**Oliver Napier**	15.32%	**6,037**									
DUP	**Denny Vitty**	0.60%	235	**7,583.32**								
UUP	**Dorothy Dunlop**	4.30%	1,696	2,066.44	2,087.4	3,270.75	3,309.37	3,323.35	3,346.83	3,511.98	4,565.11	**5,981.11**
Alliance	**Addie Morrow**	7.52%	2,966	3,057.35	3,061.67	3,088.12	3,093.21	3,401.85	3,739.59	3,793.79	4,490.85	**4,881.17**
DUP	Sammy Wilson	1.01%	397	1,239.31	3,024.43	3,044.44	3,060.98	3,065.3	3,081.24	3,258.78	3,399.61	4,169.51
Vanguard	William Craig	5.77%	2,274	2,805.72	2,825.56	2,964.48	2,988.59	2,999.87	3,025.07	3,189.56	3,360.66	
UUP	William Johnstone	2.47%	973	1,126.09	1,135.85	1,377.35	1,394.14	1,397.56	1,407.69	1,520.35		
SDLP	Peter Prendiville	2.20%	868	873.04	874.8	875.49	875.49	881.25	1,089.72			
UUUP	Reg Empey	1.28%	503	648.53	655.09	691.43	769.25	772.07	777.45			
Workers' Party	Francis Cullen	1.73%	681	696.12	696.76	704.12	706.75	711.85				
UUUP	Ben Horan	0.31%	123	184.74	187.3	198.8						
Electorate: 74,273 Valid: 39,417 (53.07%) Spoilt: 1,275 Quota: 5,632 Turnout: 40,692 (54.79%)

- Craig stood as Vanguard, although the party itself had been disbanded four years before.

=== 1975 Constitutional Convention ===
1975 Constitutional Convention: Belfast East – 6 seats
Party	Candidate	FPv%	Count										
Party	Candidate	FPv%	1	2	3	4	5	6	7	8	9	10	11
Vanguard	**William Craig**	23.84%	**11,958**										
Alliance	**Oliver Napier**	12.64%	6,341	6,393	6,449	6,469.4	6,537.4	**7,450.4**					
Vanguard	**Reg Empey**	9.28%	4,657	6,825.4	6,844	6,978.2	7,063.8	7,121.2	7,121.2	**8,297.2**			
Unionist Party NI	**Joshua Cardwell**	6.06%	3,039	3,164.6	3,180	3,220.8	3,366.8	3,586.2	3,605.6	3,718	3,756.22	6,209.52	**7,475.52**
DUP	**Eileen Paisley**	7.19%	3,606	4,893.6	4,916.6	5,073	5,179.6	5,214.4	5,214.4	6,157.8	6,653.68	6,729.86	**7,354.86**
NI Labour	**David Bleakley**	7.97%	3,998	4,059.6	4,417	4,473.2	4,548.4	5,556.2	5,714.2	5,864	5,885.56	6,257.76	**6,924.54**
DUP	Peter Robinson	7.84%	3,933	4,165	4,173.8	4,209.8	4,253	4,283.2	4,283.6	4,672.6	5,156.72	5,201.88	5,792.52
UUP	Roy Bradford	5.15%	2,583	2,828.6	2,839	2,873.6	2,991.4	3,092	3,096.8	3,362.4	3,431.98	3,756.46	
Unionist Party NI	Norman Agnew	5.71%	2,863	2,913.4	2,918.2	2,929.6	3,011.8	3,262.4	3,287.6	3,370.8	3,387.46		
UUP	David McNarry	5.20%	2,609	2,941.8	2,944.6	2,978.6	3,065.8	3,093.6	3,094				
Alliance	Kate Condy	2.96%	1,485	1,500.2	1,508	1,511	1,539						
SDLP	Alban Maginness	2.54%	1,274	1,278.4	1,286.4	1,287.2	1,293.2						
Ind. Unionist	Walter McFarland	1.55%	775	885.4	860.8	887.2							
Ind. Unionist	William Elliot	1.01%	509	591.8	606								
Labour Party NI	Sandy Scott	1.06%	530	543.6									
Electorate: 78,340 Valid: 50,160 (64.03%) Spoilt: 973 Quota: 7,166 Turnout: 51,133 (65.27%)

=== 1973 ===
1973 Assembly election: Belfast East – 6 seats
Party	Candidate	FPv%	Count																	
Party	Candidate	FPv%	1	2	3	4	5	6	7	8	9	10	11	12	13	14	15	16	17	18
UUP	**Roy Bradford**	23.22%	**13,187**																	
UUP	**Joshua Cardwell**	8.81%	5,001	6,635	6,643.38	6,649.38	6,672.9	6,754.4	6,871.78	7,002.74	7,035.68	7,063.44	7,072.2	7,571.96	**8,177.96**					
DUP	**Eileen Paisley**	9.72%	5,518	5,613	5,618.76	5,628.52	5,717.66	5,737.08	5,780.17	6,127.42	6,142.56	6,393.08	6,396.08	7,069.44	7,170.7	7,172.47	**8,907.47**			
UUP	**Norman Agnew**	6.37%	3,615	4,562.34	4,565.24	4,568.10	4,571.48	4,635.72	4,763.72	4,832.42	4,860.84	4,878.22	4,922.6	5,096.66	5,733.94	5,758.25	5,842.24	7,197.91	7,229.23	**8,027.29**
Alliance	**Oliver Napier**	8.70%	4,941	5,086.92	5,089.68	5,103.2	5,103.2	5,112.24	5,121.76	5,129.9	6,213.42	6,219.8	7,049.8	7,074.56	7,169.92	7,171.57	7,197.47	7,336.93	7,341.79	**7,418.97**
NI Labour	**David Bleakley**	7.79%	4,425	4,710.76	4,743.76	4,866.52	4,874.52	4,899.7	4,932.88	4,953.78	5,043.34	5,053.1	5,878.1	5,993.14	6,108.02	6,111.1	6,155.14	6,368.65	6,389.17	**6,690.47**
UUP	Walter McFarland	4.57%	2,597	3,000.94	3,002.32	3,005.46	3,015.84	3,120.52	3,432.38	3,499.12	3,526.44	3,541.2	3,548.58	3,662.52	4,085.54	4,102.48	4,271.55	5,435.29	5,469.31	6,436.15
Vanguard	Jim Rodgers	3.43%	1,947	1,972.46	1,974.46	1,975.46	2,068.6	2,070.36	2,076.12	2,152.02	2,154.02	3,133.2	3,134.2	3,509.86	3,550.38	3,550.82	4,492.23	4,683.96	5,386.4	
UUP	David McNarry	3.14%	1,784	2,145.76	2,145.76	2,148.14	2,155.14	2,306.02	2,504.64	2,544.68	2,558.96	2,580.1	2,583.48	2,642.62	3,182.4	3,199.23	3,237.89			
Vanguard	Tommy Herron	4.37%	2,480	2,519.9	2,524.9	2,526.9	2,561.28	2,564.8	2,577.94	2,665.88	2,672.26	2,719.26	2,722.26	3,122.34	3,146.76	3,147.2				
UUP	Walter Scott	3.18%	1,806	2,326.98	2,328.98	2,329.98	2,341.36	2,395.98	2,512.24	2,539.66	2,556.22	2,568.98	2,568.98	2,614.12						
Ind. Unionist	William Annon	3.86%	2,192	2,248.62	2,252.62	2,254.62	2,293.76	2,298.14	2,306.52	2,455.56	2,465.62	2,517.46	2,528.46							
SDLP	Owen Adams	3.26%	1,849	1,850.9	1,856.9	1,857.9	1,858.9	1,858.9	1,858.9	1,859.9	1,865.9	1,865.9								
Vanguard	Thomas Smith	2.35%	1,332	1,343.4	1,343.4	1,343.4	1,384.78	1,385.78	1,390.78	1,444.16	1,445.16									
Alliance	Kate Condy	2.21%	1,256	1,297.04	1,302.8	1,310.94	1,318.32	1,329.74	1,341.26	1,346.02										
Ind. Unionist	Michael Brooks	1.73%	983	1,063.56	1,064.56	1,065.56	1,082.56	1,086.94	1,096.7											
UUP	John McKeown	1.46%	831	973.88	973.88	974.26	975.26	1,014.6												
UUP	Elsie Logan	0.69%	394	573.36	575.36	575.36	579.36													
Ulster Constitution	Lindsay Mason	0.36%	202	205.04	205.42	206.42														
Ind. Unionist	Samuel Smyth	0.33%	189	192.8	193.8	194.8														
NI Labour	John Coulthard	0.23%	129	136.22	180.6															
NI Labour	William Gunning	0.19%	107	110.42																
Independent	Sarah Hughes	0.03%	19	19.38																
Electorate: 80,421 Valid: 56,784 (70.61%) Spoilt: 917 Quota: 8,113 Turnout: 57,701 (71.75%)
