= Billy Hutchinson =

Northern Irish Ulster Loyalist politician and activist

President of the Progressive Unionist Party
- Incumbent
- Assumed office 14 June 2023
- Leader: Russell Watton
- Preceded by: Hugh Smyth

Leader of the Progressive Unionist Party
- In office 15 October 2011 – 14 June 2023
- Deputy: Nigel Gardiner; John Kyle; Russell Watton
- Preceded by: Brian Ervine; Hugh Smyth (Interim)
- Succeeded by: Russell Watton

Member of Belfast City Council
- In office 6 January 2014 – 20 May 2023
- Preceded by: Hugh Smyth
- Succeeded by: Ron McDowell
- Constituency: Court
- In office 21 May 1997 – 5 May 2005
- Preceded by: Fred Rodgers
- Succeeded by: Fred Cobain
- Constituency: Oldpark

Member of the Northern Ireland Assembly for Belfast North
- In office 25 June 1998 – 26 November 2003
- Preceded by: New creation
- Succeeded by: Kathy Stanton

Personal details
- Born: William Hutchinson; December 1955 (age 70) Shankill, Belfast, Northern Ireland
- Party: Progressive Unionist Party
- Criminal information
- Organisation: Ulster Volunteer Force (UVF)
- Criminal charges: Murder

Billy "Hutchie" Hutchinson (born December 1955) is a Northern Irish Ulster Loyalist politician, activist, and convicted murderer who served as leader of the Progressive Unionist Party (PUP) from 2011 to 2023, now serving as party president. He was a Belfast City Councillor, representing Oldpark from 1997 to 2005, and then Court from 2014 to 2023. Hutchinson was a Member of the Northern Ireland Assembly (MLA) for Belfast North from 1998 to 2003. Before this, he had been a member of the Ulster Volunteer Force (UVF) and was a founder of their youth wing, the Young Citizen Volunteers (YCV).

== UVF activity ==
A native of the Shankill Road, Belfast, Hutchinson took part in a series of riots in the area, during which Shankill dwellers clashed with residents of the neighbouring nationalist Unity Flats area. Members of the UVF fired shots at Unity Flats and it was around this time Hutchinson became a member of the organisation, describing his part in the rioting as "my initiation" into the UVF. A strong supporter of Linfield F.C., Hutchinson would often lead his fellow Shankill-based supporters in throwing stones and singing loyalist songs at the Unity Flats as they returned from the club's Windsor Park home of the Lisburn Road. These young loyalists formed the basis of the reformed YCV, which Hutchinson played a leading role in re-establishing in the early 1970s. Hutchinson was in charge of recruitment for this group in its early years, aided by Billy Spence.

In October 1974, Hutchinson and a fellow YCV member, Thomas Winstone, drove up Northumberland Street (which links the Shankill to the neighbouring Falls Road, Belfast, a republican area) at 7:30 in the morning. They came upon two Catholic men, Michael Loughran and Edward Morgan, walking to work and shot and killed them both. Both men were arrested soon afterwards and were both charged with murder to which they pleaded guilty, receiving life sentences. Hutchinson had been the driver of the car whilst Winstone was the shooter. Both men were aged nineteen at the time of their attack.

== In prison ==
Sent to prison in Long Kesh in 1975, Hutchinson, like many other young UVF inmates, came under the influence of Gusty Spence, a founder of the modern UVF who had begun a conversion to political methods. Hutchinson had already known Spence as the two had spoken on a few occasions during 1972 when Spence, aided by his nephew Frankie Curry, had escaped from prison for a few months. Hutchinson had served as Spence's bodyguard briefly and had been in his company the day Spence was recaptured. In the prison Hutchinson, along with the likes of David Ervine, Eddie Kinner, Billy Mitchell and William "Plum" Smith, was convinced by Spence that loyalism needed to develop a more political side to its agenda and Spence encouraged these younger members to become involved in this development. In 1977 when Spence advocated a policy of dialogue with republicans, Hutchinson and Mitchell co-authored a letter to UVF members on the outside endorsing Spence's call. Whilst in prison Hutchinson took a degree in social sciences and a diploma in town planning. with the Open University.

Spence resigned from the UVF in 1978 and, after a period of collective leadership by the "officers commanding" of each prison compound, Hutchinson succeeded him as leader of the UVF in Long Kesh. This arrangement did not last long, as the UVF prisoners had grown tired of the strict disciplinary regime initiated by Spence which Hutchinson attempted to continue. However, before long the extreme lack of discipline that then ensued became too much for several senior figures to stand and as a consequence in 1984 Hutchinson took control again, holding the post until his release from prison in 1990.

Hutchinson was also nominated by the UVF as their point of contact with John de Chastelain and the Independent International Commission on Decommissioning and he helped to ensure the eventual decommissioning of some UVF weapons in 2009. This was despite the fact that Hutchinson had been a noted sceptic on the issue and had criticised David Trimble because of it, arguing that his insistence on republican decommissioning was in fact damaging the peace process.

== Political career ==
Soon after his release from prison Hutchinson became active in the Progressive Unionist Party (PUP) and began working towards the establishment of the Northern Ireland peace process. During the early 1990s Hutchinson and David Ervine became more familiar faces in the media, presenting loyalist political demands. Both men were influenced by the example of Sinn Féin, who had demonstrated that an articulate media presence could ensure that paramilitary groups' demands might be heard. Hutchinson and Ervine in particular became close personal friends as well as colleagues and also enjoyed a friendly rivalry with Hutchinson being a Linfield-supporting west Belfast man and Ervine from the east of the city and a Glentoran F.C. fan. Along with Spence and Ervine, Hutchinson was a strong advocate of moves towards peace and he played a leading role in helping to convince UVF commanders to endorse the Combined Loyalist Military Command ceasefire in 1994. Following the announcement of the ceasefire Hutchinson was part of a six-man delegation representing the PUP and the Ulster Democratic Party (UDP) that toured the United States.

Hutchinson became known as a strong supporter of the peace process, not least during an incident in Northwest Belfast in the summer of 1996. Protestants in the loyalist enclave of Torrens – a small area between the mainly nationalist Oldpark and Cliftonville roads – had been involved in a stand-off with Catholics in neighbouring Ardoyne and this had escalated when a number of Provisional IRA members entered Ardoyne to protect residents. Members of the UVF then entered Torrens, having retrieved weapons (including an AK-47) from an arms dump, and a clash between the two groups looked imminent. When Hutchinson learned of this he entered Torrens and convinced the UVF members to put down their weapons, even standing in front of the AK-47 wielder to prevent him approaching Ardoyne. The weapon was removed and the UVF left the area with the incident defusing as a result. He also spoke at an event in the nationalist Bogside area of Derry, during which he expressed support for the possibility of non-executive cross-border bodies before posing for pictures with local Sinn Féin activist Robin Perceval.

=== PUP leader ===
In October 2011 Billy Hutchinson was elected leader of the Progressive Unionist Party at the party's annual conference in succession to Brian Ervine. In this role Hutchinson took a leading role in the December 2012 campaign of protests and road blockades by loyalists following Belfast City Council passing a resolution to end the practice of flying the Union Flag from Belfast City Hall all year round and instead to limit its use to certain designated days. Hutchinson suggested that the process by which the vote was held may not have been legal and on 15 December stated that he would make an announcement about a legal challenge in the "next few days".

In 2013, Hutchinson announced his intention to run in both forthcoming council and parliamentary elections. He claimed that he would focus his attentions on South Antrim.

In January 2014, he was co-opted to Belfast City Council for the Court District, succeeding Hugh Smyth who had retired on health grounds.

=== Elections ===
Hutchinson was a candidate for the PUP in North Belfast in the 1996 election to the Northern Ireland Forum. He was not elected although the PUP managed to win two seats in the interim body. He returned as North Belfast candidate for the 1998 election to the new Northern Ireland Assembly and was elected to this body. Hutchinson lost his seat in the 2003 election after the Democratic Unionist Party and Sinn Féin took an extra seat each.

He ran again in North Belfast at the 2016 and 2022 elections, but was unsuccessful in returning to the Assembly.

Hutchinson ran for the PUP in the 1997 local government election and was elected to Belfast City Council as a representative of the Oldpark District Electoral Area, topping the poll among unionist candidates in this area. He retained the seat in 2001 but lost it in 2005 to Fred Cobain of the Ulster Unionist Party.

At the 2014 Northern Ireland local elections, Hutchinson returned to Belfast City Council, this time as a representative for the Court DEA, succeeding former PUP Leader, Hugh Smyth. He topped the poll, with 1674 first preference votes, and successfully retained his seat in the 2019 local elections.

In the 2023 local elections, he lost his seat to the Traditional Unionist Voice (TUV) candidate, leaving the PUP with no representation on Belfast City Council.

== 2000 feud ==
In 2000 Hutchinson was caught up in a loyalist feud that broke out between the UVF and the West Belfast Brigade of the Ulster Defence Association (UDA). The roots of Hutchinson's involvement lay three years earlier in the immediate aftermath of the killing of Loyalist Volunteer Force (LVF) leader Billy Wright by the Irish National Liberation Army (INLA). Wright had been close to the West Belfast UDA and as a result their leading hitman Stephen McKeag shot up a Catholic bar in the Cliftonville Road in retaliation.

The UDA encouraged the LVF to claim the attack but when the claim was made Hutchinson refuted it and placed the blame on the UDA. He received a strong rebuke for this from the UDP's John White, who accused Hutchinson of working with Sinn Féin and the SDLP against the UDA. The war of words had ignited despite the fact that Hutchinson and White had enjoyed a close friendship in prison.

After violent clashes between members of both groups on the Shankill Road the UVF shot and killed two men close to the UDA's West Belfast leadership, Jackie Coulter and Bobby Mahood. The UDA Brigadier Johnny Adair was enraged by this development and, seeing Hutchinson being interviewed about the feud on television, phoned one of his deputies Jim Spence, who lived near Hutchinson, and allegedly told him to "go and shoot him right now". Spence told Adair he would but delayed as he wanted to end the feud with as little bloodshed as possible whilst his phone had been tapped by RUC Special Branch who were able to warn Hutchinson. As a result, the attack did not occur. On 31 October of that same year, Bertie Rice, a friend of Hutchinson and a voluntary worker at his constituency office, was shot and killed by members of the UDA's North Belfast Brigade who were close to Adair.

== Subsequent activity ==
In October 2007 Hutchinson was arrested in connection with the August 2005 murder of Catholic teenager Thomas Devlin. A protest followed outside the police station in which he was being held although ultimately Hutchinson was released without charge. Hutchinson was at the time a community worker in the Mount Vernon estate on Belfast's Shore Road, the area in which it was thought the killers were based.

In July 2010 he attended a protest at an Asda store on the Shore Road, Belfast regarding the sacking of an employee. The employee was dismissed due to a complaint about him making a remark construed as promoting the loyalist song, The Sash. After an appeal the employee was reinstated.

In March 2014, in an interview with the Belfast Newsletter, Hutchinson was quoted as saying that he had "no regrets" about his past in relation to the random murders of his two Catholic victims in 1974, claiming that he had helped to prevent a united Ireland by his actions.

== Beliefs ==
Hutchinson has often stressed the importance of the working class nature of loyalism and has argued in favour of socialism. His declared support for socialism also came in for strong criticism from then UVF Mid-Ulster Brigade commander Billy Wright whose virulent opposition to left-wing politics helped to push him away from the mainstream UVF. John Gregg, Brigadier of the UDA South East Antrim Brigade and, like Wright, a man with close links to far right groups in England, was also a strong critic of Hutchinson and accused him of thinking "like a republican". Hutchinson has conceded that some of his ideas were influenced by contact with Official IRA members with whom he studied in prison.

In a 2020 interview, Hutchinson stated, "I justify everything I did in the Troubles. To stay sane, I have to."

== Writing ==
Hutchinson's memoir, My Life in Loyalism, is published by Merrion Press in November 2020.

Northern Ireland Assembly
New assembly	MLA for Belfast North; 1998–2003	Succeeded by Kathy Stanton
