= Hugh Smyth =

Northern Irish politician (1939–2014)

Hugh Smyth OBE
- Smyth in his mayoral robes, 1994

President of the Progressive Unionist Party
- In office 15 October 2011 – 12 May 2014
- Leader: Billy Hutchinson
- Succeeded by: Billy Hutchinson

Leader of the Progressive Unionist Party
- Interim; 2 June 2011 – 15 October 2011
- Preceded by: Brian Ervine
- Succeeded by: Billy Hutchinson
- In office 1979 – 13 April 2002
- Preceded by: Party created
- Succeeded by: David Ervine

51st Lord Mayor of Belfast
- In office 1 June 1994 – 1 June 1995
- Deputy: Ian Adamson
- Preceded by: Reg Empey
- Succeeded by: Eric Smyth

Deputy Lord Mayor of Belfast
- In office 2001–2002
- Preceded by: Frank McCoubrey
- Succeeded by: Margaret Crooks (2003)
- In office 1993–1994
- Preceded by: Frank Millar
- Succeeded by: Ian Adamson
- In office 1983–1984
- Preceded by: Frederick Ashby
- Succeeded by: Billy Blair

Member of Belfast City Council
- In office 15 May 1985 – 6 January 2014
- Preceded by: New district
- Succeeded by: Billy Hutchinson
- Constituency: Court
- In office 30 May 1973 – 15 May 1985
- Preceded by: New district
- Succeeded by: District abolished
- Constituency: Belfast Area E
- In office 13 May 1972 – 30 May 1973
- Preceded by: John McQuade
- Succeeded by: District abolished
- Constituency: Shankhill

Member of the Northern Ireland Forum
- In office 30 May 1996 – 25 April 1998
- Preceded by: Forum created
- Succeeded by: Forum dissolved
- Constituency: Top-up list

Member of the Northern Ireland Constitutional Convention for Belfast West
- In office 1975–1976
- Preceded by: Convention created
- Succeeded by: Convention dissolved

Member of the Northern Ireland Assembly for Belfast West
- In office 28 June 1973 – 1974
- Preceded by: New Assembly
- Succeeded by: Assembly abolished

Personal details
- Born: 16 March 1939 Woodvale, Belfast, Northern Ireland
- Died: 12 May 2014 (aged 75) Belfast, Northern Ireland
- Party: Progressive Unionist Party (1979–2014)
- Other political affiliations: Volunteer Political Party (1974); Independent Unionist (1973–1979)
- Spouse: Ellen Smyth (m. 1974)
- Known for: Ulster loyalist politician

Hugh Smyth OBE (16 March 1939 – 12 May 2014) was a Northern Irish Ulster Loyalist and politician who was leader of the Progressive Unionist Party (PUP) from 1979 to 2002, as well as during an interim period in 2011. He was Lord Mayor of Belfast from 1994 to 1995, as well as a Belfast City Councillor for the Court and Belfast Area E DEAs from 1972 to January 2014, making him one of the longest-serving members on the Council. Smyth was awarded the Order of the British Empire in the 1996 New Year's Honours list.

== Emergence in politics ==
Born in the Woodvale Road district of the Shankill Road area of Belfast, Smyth was one of nine children and was educated locally and worked as a metal bonder in the Short Brothers factory before entering full-time politics.

Smyth first came to attention in the early 1970s when he served as a public spokesman for the Ulster Volunteer Force although he was not an active member of the organisation. His inspiration for politics was the struggle his father endured whilst working to support his family. Deeply opposed to what he described as 'Big House Unionism', he stated that at that time Belfast City Council was composed mostly of upper class unionists who sought to obstruct working class council members by holding council meetings during the daytime, when working class councillors were required to be at work.

He was elected to the Northern Ireland Assembly in 1973 under the label of Independent Unionist, a well-established term used in Northern Irish politics for unionists outside the major unionist parties. While serving in the Assembly, Smyth was claimed by the UVF as a member of the Ulster Loyalist Front, a political arm that the group had established in October 1973. Although it revealed some policies, including increased use of referendums, worker cooperative initiatives, improvements in social care, and alterations to the educational and social housing systems, the group disappeared almost immediately and Smyth retained his independent designation. He also joined its successor group, the Volunteer Political Party, when it was formed, but this group also made no impact and dissolved soon afterwards. Smyth was also elected to the Northern Ireland Constitutional Convention in 1975, once again as an Independent Unionist. Smyth remained close to the UVF. On 2 October 1975, he accompanied a UVF delegation to a meeting with leading figures from the Northern Ireland Office.

== Progressive unionist ==
Smyth and some like-minded followers came together in 1978 under the name Independent Unionist Group, a more formalised alliance of working-class independent unionists based in Belfast of which Smyth was leader. The group was close to the UVF. This group would change its name to the Progressive Unionist Party the following year as a response to the growing Ulster nationalism within the Ulster Defence Association, with Smyth and his fellow founders fearing that their description as "independent Unionists" might lead to them being associated with independence to which they were opposed. Smyth was close to leading UVF member Gusty Spence, who had become a supporter of political methods, and the two worked to recruit David Ervine to the PUP after being impressed by his ability as a speaker.

Hoping to gain some understanding of his republican opponents, Smyth was one of only two unionist politicians to accept an offer to visit Provisional Irish Republican Army (PIRA) inmates in Long Kesh in the early 1980s (the other was John Carson).

As leader of the PUP, Smyth ran as a candidate for West Belfast in the elections to the 1982 Assembly although he failed to take the seat and the PUP as a whole did not gain any representation. Although Smyth managed to build up a strong personal following on the Shankill Road, this did not transfer to the rest of the PUP which enjoyed little success elsewhere, barring a single member's election to Carrickfergus Borough Council in 1985 and 1989, until after the 1994 ceasefire.

== Belfast City Council ==
Smyth was first elected to the council in 1972 as representative for the Shankill ward. He won a by-election resulting from the resignation of John McQuade, and beat James Brown of the Ulster Unionist Party and David Robb of the Ulster Constitution Party in a three-way contest. In the election, he received the support of McQuade's party, the Democratic Unionists. Following a change in council structure, he was re-elected the following year for "Area E" which included the Glencairn, Woodvale, Ballysillan, Highfield, Legoniel and Ardoyne areas. He subsequently represented the Court electoral area which covered Glencairn, Highfield, Woodvale and the mid and lower Shankill areas. Smyth was appointed as Alderman in 1978, receiving the same honour in 1985, 1989 and 1993. In 1983 he was chosen as deputy mayor and served in this capacity again in 1993 before being appointed as Lord Mayor in June 1994. He again served as deputy mayor in 2001. As a councillor Smyth had been willing to oppose the main unionist parties on some issues, as he demonstrated in 1991 when he helped to overturn a ban on government ministers visiting Belfast City Hall, an initiative passed by unionist councillors in 1985 as a reaction to the Anglo-Irish Agreement.

== Ceasefire and after ==
Following the 1994 ceasefire by the Combined Loyalist Military Command, of which the UVF was a member, Smyth became an important figure in the negotiations that followed, accompanying Ervine and Ulster Democratic Party representatives Gary McMichael and John White to 10 Downing Street in June 1996 for a meeting designed to prevent the collapse of the ceasefire. Indeed, Spence has claimed that Smyth personally held a number of individual meetings with John Major in the aftermath of the ceasefire. The same year Smyth was elected to the Northern Ireland Forum, along with Ervine, as "top-up" members on account of the PUP finishing in seventh place overall.

Following his election Smyth clashed with UK Unionist Party (UKUP) leader Robert McCartney who, like Smyth, was born in Belfast's Shankill Road. McCartney suggested that the two were thus similar but for one thing – McCartney had got out, a rebuke to Smyth and the run-down and deprived state of the Shankill area. Around this time he also criticised the DUP. Referring to the scene of an IRA bomb attack in 1972 at the Four Step Inn where he was helping retrieve bodies from the rubble, Ian Paisley approached him and said "Your worries are over. I have just formed the DUP. Everything is going to be all right". Smyth was unimpressed and remarked "but another 3000 people are dead and buried and what has the DUP done. It has done nothing."

In the 1997 general election Smyth stood as PUP candidate in South Antrim where his 9% vote share was seen as a respectable result in what had been a traditionally solid Ulster Unionist Party seat. He was subsequently a candidate in the Northern Ireland Assembly elections of 1998 and 2003, in his home constituency of West Belfast, though was unsuccessful. Smyth gave up leadership of the PUP in 2002, with Ervine chosen as his successor.

Smyth successfully defended his council seat in the 2011 local elections. Smyth was not due to be a candidate for the 2014 local elections having announced his retirement from politics due to ill health in late 2013.

== Death ==
Smyth's death was announced on 12 May 2014 following a period of illness. He was 73 years old. His funeral took place on 16 May and set off from the West Belfast Orange Hall on the Shankill Road to the service at St Anne's Cathedral. Shops on the Shankill Road along the route closed as a mark of respect. A member of the Orange Order, his coffin was flanked by other members including DUP politicians Nigel Dodds and William Humphrey. Other attendees included Sinn Féin representatives Niall Ó Donnghaile and Paul Maskey. He was buried at Roselawn Cemetery.

Northern Ireland Assembly (1973)
New assembly	Assembly Member for West Belfast; 1973–1974	Assembly abolished
Northern Ireland Constitutional Convention
New convention	Member for West Belfast; 1975–1976	Convention dissolved
Northern Ireland Forum
New forum	Regional Member; 1996–1998	Forum dissolved
Civic offices
Preceded by Ted Ashby	Deputy Lord Mayor of Belfast; 1983–1984	Succeeded by Billy Dickson
Preceded by Frank Millar	Deputy Lord Mayor of Belfast; 1993–1994	Succeeded by Ian Adamson
Preceded by Frank McCoubrey	Deputy Lord Mayor of Belfast; 2001–2002	Vacant Title next held by Margaret Crooks
Preceded by Reg Empey	Lord Mayor of Belfast; 1994–1995	Succeeded by Eric Smyth
Party political offices
New political party	Leader of the Progressive Unionist Party; 1979–2002	Succeeded by David Ervine
Preceded by Brian Ervine	Interim Leader of the Progressive Unionist Party; 2011	Succeeded by Billy Hutchinson
