= Dawn Purvis =

Northern Irish policy director and unionist politician

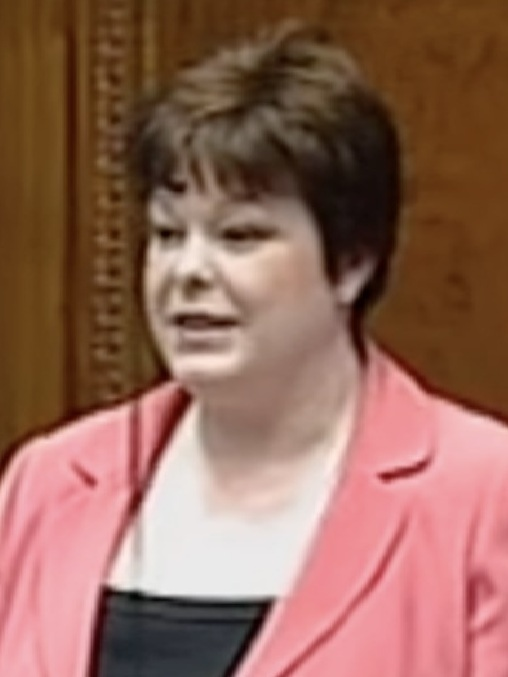
- Purvis in 2007

Leader of the Progressive Unionist Party
- In office 23 January 2007 – 2 June 2010
- Deputy: Andy Park
- Preceded by: David Ervine
- Succeeded by: John Kyle (acting); Brian Ervine

Member of the Northern Ireland Assembly for Belfast East
- In office 7 March 2007 – May 2011
- Preceded by: David Ervine
- Succeeded by: Judith Cochrane

Personal details
- Born: 22 October 1966 (age 59) Donegall Pass, Belfast, Northern Ireland
- Party: Independent (2010 - present)
- Other political affiliations: PUP (1994 - 2010)
- Website: Official website

Dawn Purvis (born 22 October 1966) is a Northern Irish company executive and former unionist politician, who was a Member of the Northern Ireland Assembly (MLA) for Belfast East from 2007 to 2011. She was previously the leader of the Progressive Unionist Party (PUP) from 2007 to 2010.

== Biography ==
Born in the Donegall Pass area of Belfast, Purvis joined the PUP in 1994. She stood for the party in the 1996 Northern Ireland Forum election in Belfast South and then in the 1998 Northern Ireland Assembly election in Belfast South, here taking 271 votes. She served as director of the Marie Stopes clinic in Belfast.

In November 2014, Bernadette Smyth, founder of the Precious Life organisation, was found guilty of the harassment of Purvis, but the verdict was later quashed.

== Political career ==
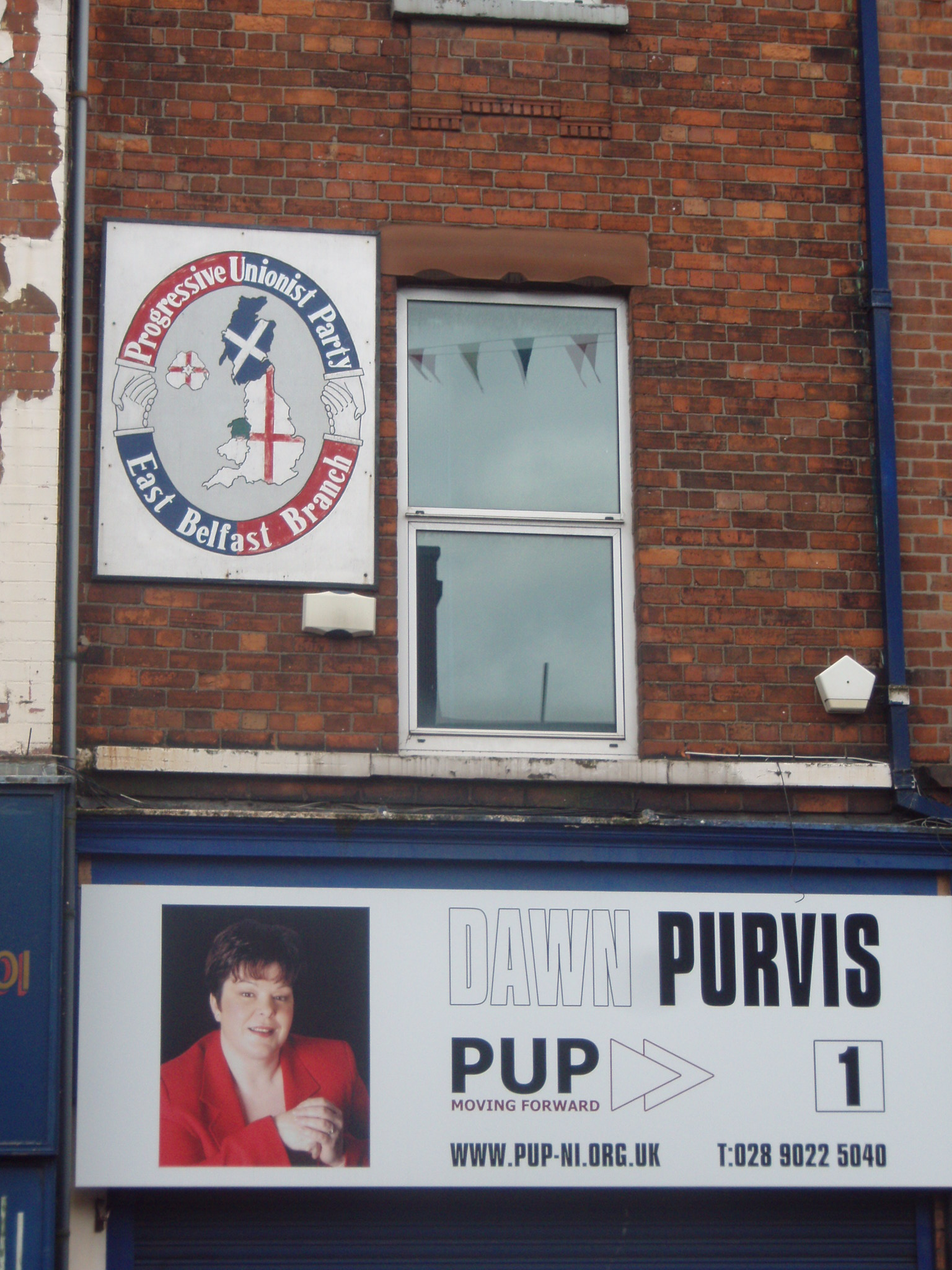
Dawn Purvis PUP office

By 1999, Purvis was the PUP's Spokesperson on Women's Affairs. She took a degree in Women's Studies, Social Policy and Social Anthropology and began working full-time for the party.

Purvis stood in Belfast South in the 2001 UK general election, finishing in sixth place with a total of 1112 votes (2.9%).

In 2006, Purvis was appointed to the Northern Ireland Policing Board. Her appointment was later criticised by the Democratic Unionist Party, because of the PUP's links with the paramilitary Ulster Volunteer Force (UVF).

In January 2007, Purvis succeeded the late David Ervine as leader of the PUP and MLA for Belfast East. Commenting on her new role she said:

I am deeply honoured to have been made the leader of the PUP. However this is also tinged with sadness given the huge loss of David. It is a huge challenge to step into this role, especially after the good work he did. But this gives us an opportunity to rebuild and continue to serve working class loyalists and unionist communities.

In her maiden speech in the Assembly she said "As long as there is poverty, and as long as there is inequality in education, health and gender, it will be my duty to articulate the needs of the working and workless classes in East Belfast."

Purvis was re-elected in the constituency at the 2007 Assembly election on the tenth and final round of counting. She polled 3045 votes (10.3%)

In 2011 Dawn left politics and became the Northern Ireland Programme Director with Marie Stopes International (MSI).

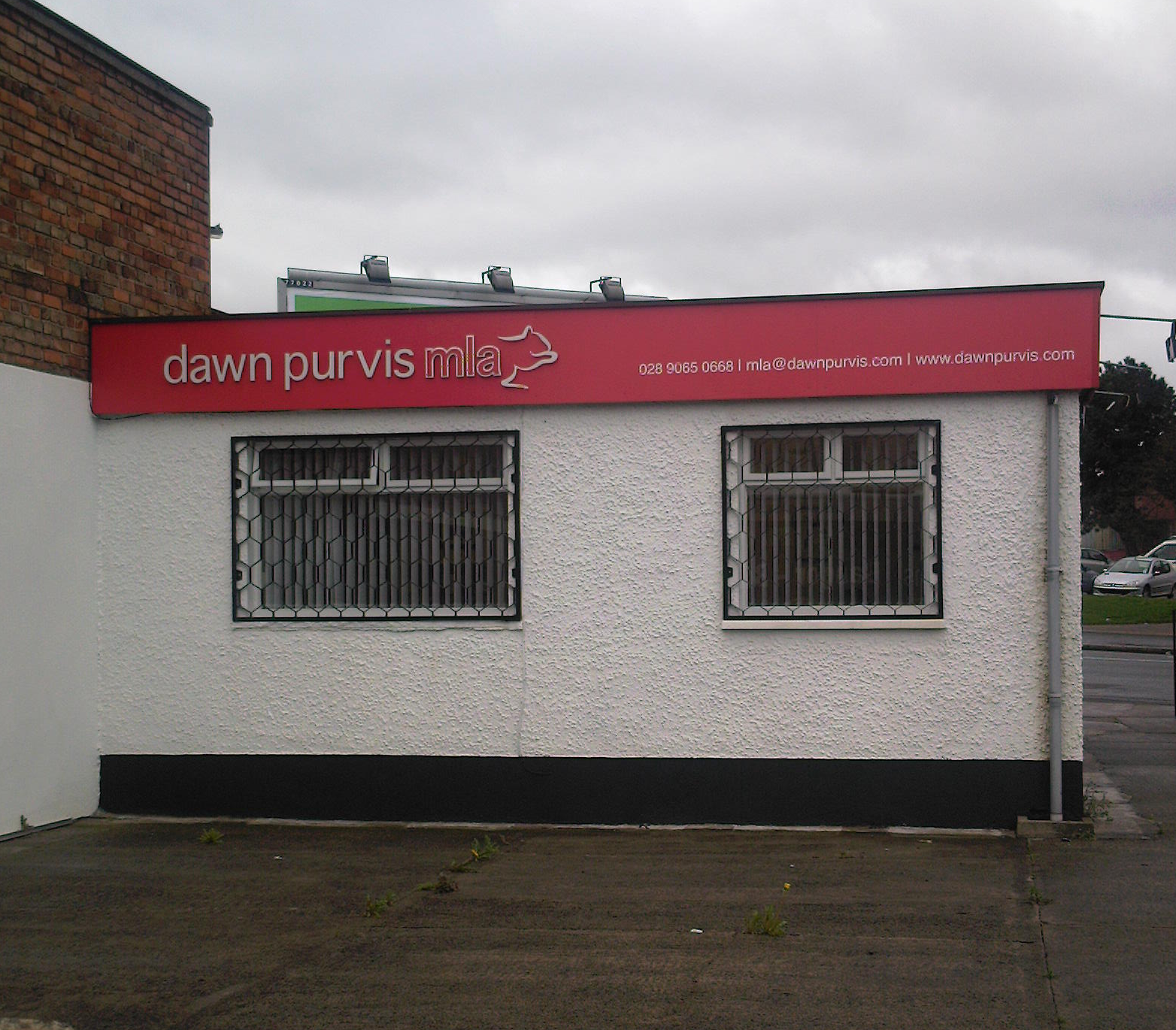
Constituency office of Dawn Purvis as independent MLA, Holywood Road, Belfast, April 2011

=== Resignation from PUP ===
In June 2010, Purvis resigned as leader, and as a member, of the PUP because of its relationship with the UVF and the murder of Bobby Moffet which was attributed to that group by the Independent Monitoring Commission.

=== Electoral defeat ===
In the 2011 Assembly election Purvis defended her seat as an independent candidate with PUP leader Brian Ervine running against her. In the end neither candidate was elected and instead the Alliance Party of Northern Ireland gained a second East Belfast seat. Purvis polled 1702 votes (5.2%)

Northern Ireland Assembly
Preceded by David Ervine	MLA for Belfast East; 2007–2011	Succeeded by Judith Cochrane
Political offices
Preceded by David Ervine	Leader of the Progressive Unionist Party; 2007–2010	Succeeded by John Kyle (Acting)
