= David Ervine =

Northern Irish loyalist and politician (1953–2007)

Leader of the Progressive Unionist Party
- In office 13 April 2002 – 8 January 2007
- Deputy: David Rose; Andy Park
- Preceded by: Hugh Smyth
- Succeeded by: Dawn Purvis

Member of the Northern Ireland Assembly for Belfast East
- In office 25 June 1998 – 8 January 2007
- Preceded by: New Creation
- Succeeded by: Dawn Purvis

Member of Belfast City Council
- In office 21 May 1997 – 8 January 2007
- Preceded by: Jim Walker
- Succeeded by: John Kyle
- Constituency: Pottinger

Member of the Northern Ireland Forum
- In office 30 May 1996 – 25 April 1998
- Preceded by: Forum created
- Succeeded by: Forum dissolved
- Constituency: Top-up list

Personal details
- Born: 21 July 1953 Belfast, Northern Ireland
- Died: 8 January 2007 (aged 53) Belfast, Northern Ireland
- Party: Progressive Unionist Party
- Spouse: Jeanette Cunningham (m. 1971)
- Relations: Brian Ervine (Brother)
- Children: Mark Owen
- Website: PUP

Military service
- Paramilitary: Ulster Volunteer Force (c. 1972–1980)
- Conflict: The Troubles

David Ervine (21 July 1953 – 8 January 2007) was a Northern Irish Ulster Loyalist and politician who served as leader of the Progressive Unionist Party (PUP) from 2002 to 2007 and was also a Member of the Northern Ireland Assembly (MLA) for Belfast East from 1998 to 2007. During his youth Ervine was a member of the Ulster Volunteer Force (UVF) and was imprisoned for possessing bomb-making equipment, and planting a bomb on the Lisburn Road. Whilst in jail he became convinced of the benefits of a more political approach for loyalism and became involved with the PUP. As a leading PUP figure, Ervine helped to deliver the loyalist ceasefire of 1994.

== Early life ==
David Ervine was the youngest of five children born to Walter and Elizabeth Ervine. He was from Chamberlain Street in a Protestant working-class area of east Belfast between the Albertbridge and Newtownards roads. His household was not loyalist at all: his father Walter described himself as a socialist, had no time for Ian Paisley and didn't attend church. When Ervine joined the Orange Order aged 18, he said he was the first member of his family to ever be a member. His membership, however, did not last long. Like many in his situation, he grew up closely identifying with his community and absorbed its unionist ideals and opinions. Ervine left Orangefield High School (Orangefield Boys Secondary School) at 14 and, aged 19, joined the UVF, believing this step to be the only way to ensure the defence of the Protestant community after the events of Bloody Friday. A neighbour of Ervine's, William Irvine, who was a member of the Ulster Defence Association (UDA), had died in one of the bomb blasts on that day.

Before joining the UVF Ervine had attempted to join the Royal Ulster Constabulary (RUC), but due to a misdemeanour in his childhood involving a stolen bicycle he was refused entry.

== Arrest and imprisonment ==
Ervine was arrested in November 1974, while an active member of the UVF. He was driving a stolen car containing five pounds of commercial explosives, a detonator and fuse wire. After seven months on remand in Crumlin Road Gaol, he was found guilty of possession of explosives with intent to endanger life. He was sentenced to 11 years and imprisoned in The Maze. While in prison, Ervine came under the influence of Gusty Spence who made him question what the loyalist struggle was about. Spence's influence unquestionably changed Ervine's direction: after much study and self-analysis, Ervine emerged with the view that change through politics was the only option. He also became friends with Billy Hutchinson while in prison.

== Release ==
Ervine was released from prison in 1980. He owned a newsagents' in Belfast for several years before taking up full-time politics. He stood in local council elections as a Progressive Unionist Party (PUP) candidate in 1985. In 1998, he was elected to the Northern Ireland Assembly to represent Belfast East and was re-elected in 2003. He was also a member of Belfast City Council from 1997.

== Loyalist ceasefire ==
Ervine played a pivotal role in bringing civil disorder to the loyalist ceasefire of October 1994. He was part of a delegation to Downing Street in June 1996 that met then British Prime Minister John Major to discuss the loyalist ceasefire.

== Forum ==
In 1996 Ervine was elected to the Northern Ireland Forum from the regional list, having been an unsuccessful candidate in the East Belfast constituency.

== Progressive ==
Ervine was considered to be one of the most progressive unionists in Northern Ireland politics. He had been a strong supporter of the Good Friday Agreement and was one of the few unionist politicians actively to support the Agreement. At a Labour Party meeting in 2001, then Northern Ireland Secretary, John Reid, described him as "one of the most eloquent politicians in Northern Ireland". Some of his political peers, such as John Reid, made references to him having swallowed a dictionary, in reference to coming more informative and educated. In Landscapes of Defense, Ervine was seen as one of the few politicians actively engaged with conflict resolution.

In the Northern Ireland Assembly, he was seen as a Unionist sympathetic to the short-term demands of Sinn Féin, resisting attempts by the Democratic Unionist Party (DUP) to exclude Sinn Féin from office in July 2000 and October 2001. In April 2001, he provoked a direct political attack from the DUP over being the only unionist to vote against a motion condemning the display of lilies commemorating the 1916 Easter Rising at Parliament Buildings. Ervine also expressed support for the right of Sinn Féin members to make speeches in Irish on the floor of the Assembly. Later, editors and political commentators such as John Laverty noted how he sat next to Sinn Féin's Martin McGuinness at the funeral of Northern Ireland football legend George Best in December 2005 as a sign of how Northern Ireland had moved on.

== Independent Monitoring Commission ==
In May 2005, the Independent Monitoring Commission (IMC) recommended a continuation of the financial sanctions on the Assembly salaries of PUP members imposed following its report of April 2004. The IMC was of the opinion that the UVF and the PUP maintained strong links while the former was heavily involved in criminality. It further noted that the UVF was responsible for a number of acts of violence (including murder) and was actively maintaining its capacity to wage a terrorist campaign. It concluded that, 12 months after the sanctions were originally imposed, the PUP leadership was still not doing enough to address the UVF's criminal and paramilitary activities.

Ervine appealed the IMC's recommendation to newly appointed Northern Ireland Secretary Peter Hain on the basis that he and the PUP could not be held directly responsible for the UVF's actions, and thus it was wrong to penalise them as such.

The IMC again recommended financial sanctions against Ervine and the PUP. These came in a special report of September 2005 on the violent feud that had erupted between the UVF and the Loyalist Volunteer Force (LVF) that summer, in which a number of murders and attempted murders had been committed. It argued that the PUP leadership was still in a position significantly to influence the UVF: the party could not have it both ways by associating with an active paramilitary organisation without facing political consequences.

In its final regular reports of Ervine's life in April and October 2006, the IMC concluded that it was satisfied the PUP leadership had taken appropriate action to de-escalate UVF's violence and criminality, and it withdrew its punitive recommendations.

== Links with Ulster Unionists ==
On 13 May 2006, it was announced that when the Northern Ireland Assembly reconvened, Ervine would join the Ulster Unionist assembly group, while remaining leader of the Progressive Unionist Party. Under the D'Hondt method used for allocating places on the Northern Ireland Executive, this would entitle the Ulster Unionists to an additional place.

The Presiding Officer (Speaker) of the Assembly, Eileen Bell MLA indicated at the first meeting of the 'shadow' Assembly (15 May 2006) that she would take legal advice before ruling on whether Mr Ervine could be treated as a member of the UUP group.

On 11 September 2006 Ms Bell announced that the Ulster Unionist Party Assembly Group did not have a headquarters, at least one party leader and a scheme for financial support; thus it did not qualify as a political party. This meant that the UUPAG could not sit in the Assembly, so the alliance was deemed as invalid.

== Identity ==
Ervine was a Protestant and identified himself as both Irish and British. He once exclaimed "why can't I be an Irish citizen of the UK?" and remarked: "I am profoundly both British and Irish and those who have to deal with me have to take me on those terms."

== Allegations of collusion with security forces ==
Ervine dismissed allegations of collusion between loyalists and British security forces as "sheer unadulterated nonsense", saying, "there comes a point when the concept insults me, insomuch as that a Provo could lie in bed and with a crystal ball... could pick their targets but a Prod could only do the same if there was an SAS man driving the car".

Ervine cited his own arrest, and the number of UVF members in prison at the time, as evidence that widespread collusion did not exist:

"The Royal Ulster Constabulary arrested me on possession of explosives; now why did they do that if we lived in a process of collusion? When I went into jail there were 240 UVF men in three compounds, packed in like sardines, and the UVF were a relatively small organisation in comparison to some of the others, but they made up a hell of a percentage of that jail. Where’s collusion there?"

== Illness and death ==
Ervine was reported as having suffered two massive heart attacks and a stroke after attending a football match between Glentoran and Armagh City at The Oval in Belfast on 6 January 2007. It was later confirmed that he had a heart attack, a stroke and a brain haemorrhage. He was taken to the Ulster Hospital in Dundonald and was later admitted to the Royal Victoria Hospital in Belfast. Ervine died on 8 January 2007, aged 53. RTÉ News at 9 pm and its website had incorrectly reported the previous evening that he had died. The incorrect report led RTÉ's Northern Editor, Tommie Gorman, to apologise for the error.

Ervine's body was cremated at Roselawn Crematorium after a funeral service on 12 January in East Belfast. The service was attended by Mark Durkan, George Cassidy, Gerry Adams, Peter Hain, Dermot Ahern, Hugh Orde and David Trimble, among others.

=== Tributes ===
- Brian Ervine, Ervine's elder brother: "He had the guts and the courage to climb out of the traditional trenches, meet the enemy in no-man's land and play ball with him."
- Bertie Ahern (Taoiseach): "(Ervine) was a courageous politician who sought to channel the energies of loyalism in a positive political direction."
- Reg Empey MLA: "Northern Ireland has today lost a unique, charismatic and uncharacteristically spin-free politician."
- Gerry Adams MLA/MP: "He made a valuable and important contribution to moving our society away from conflict."
- George Mitchell (Former US Senator): "His legacy is that he has led loyalism out of the Dark Ages."
- Mark Durkan MLA/MP: "David emerged from a paramilitary past to pursue a peaceful future. Throughout the talks he played a positive role and worked always to keep loyalism onboard for the Good Friday Agreement." (...) "He also championed a more constructive unionism and argued that we can all gain from political accommodation."
- Trevor Sargent TD: "His death leaves a major vacuum in terms of the quality of political representatives in Northern Ireland. I hope that the legacy of Mr Ervine's bravery will be taken up by others after him."
- Tony Blair (British Prime Minister): "David was a man who, whatever his past, played a major part in this last 10 years in trying to bring peace to Ulster."

== Legacy ==
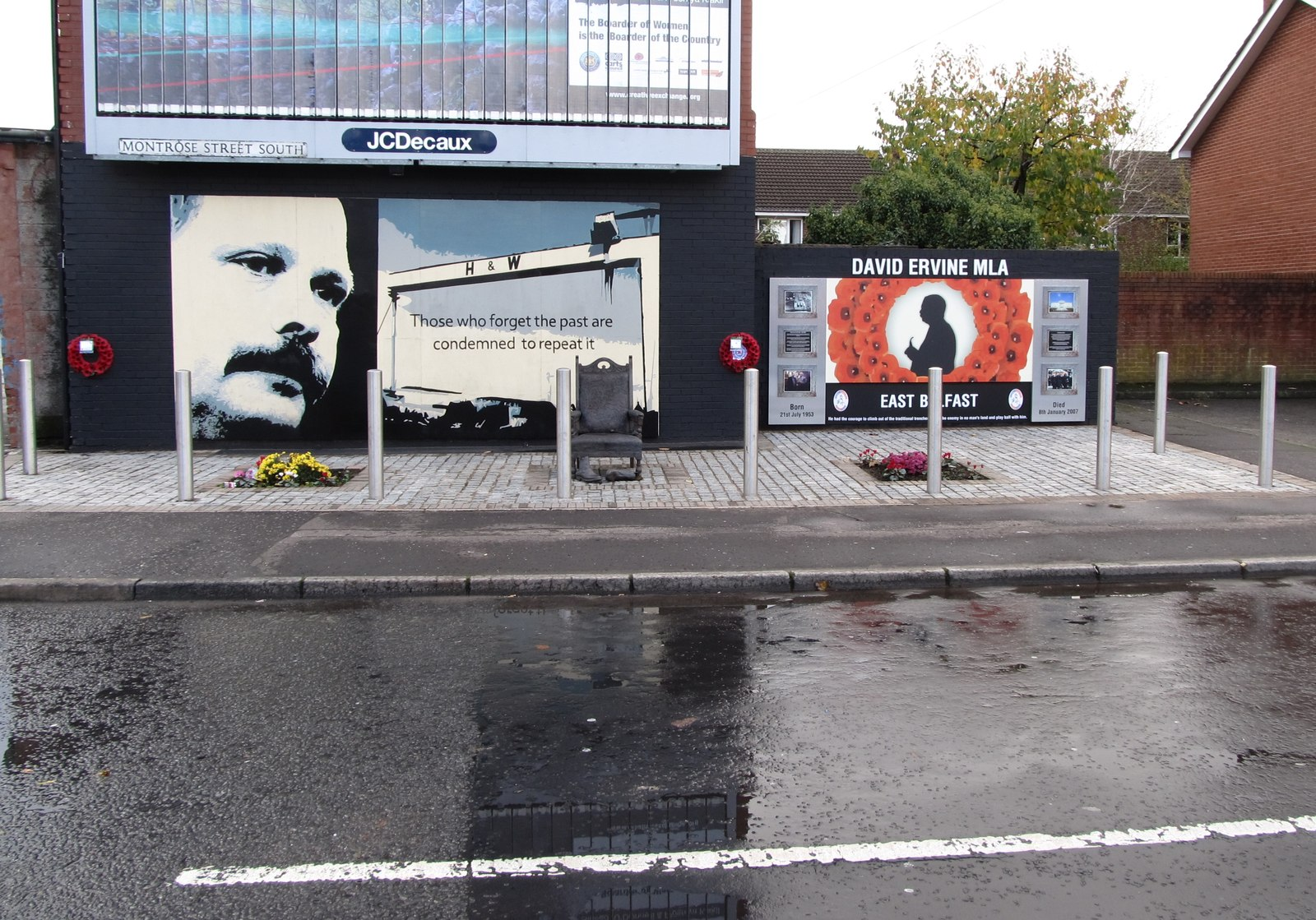
David Ervine memorial on Montrose Street

A memorial for David Ervine was erected on the Albertbridge Road, East Belfast.

In 2023, Robert Niblock wrote a play about David Ervine, named The Man Who Swallowed a Dictionary. Niblock said attendees ranged from republicans to ex-prisoners and politicians, all of whom had praised the play. It premiered in the Lyric Theatre in August of that year.

== See also ==
- Unionism (Ireland)
- Progressive Unionist Party
- Ulster Volunteer Force
- Ulster Loyalist

== Bibliography ==
- David Ervine: Uncharted Waters by Henry Sinnerton (2003), ISBN 0-86322-312-5
- Loyalists by Peter Taylor (1999), ISBN 0-7475-4519-7

Northern Ireland Forum
New forum	Regional Member; 1996–1998	Forum dissolved
Northern Ireland Assembly
New assembly	MLA for Belfast East; 1998–2007	Succeeded by Dawn Purvis
Political offices
Preceded by Hugh Smyth	Leader of the Progressive Unionist Party; 2002–2007	Succeeded by Dawn Purvis
