= Progressive Unionist Party =

Political party in Northern Ireland

- Abbreviation: PUP
- Leader: Russell Watton
- President: Billy Hutchinson
- Chairman: Brian Lacey
- Founder: Hugh Smyth
- Founded: 1979
- Preceded by: Volunteer Political Party
- Ideology: British unionism Ulster loyalism Democratic socialism Social democracy
- Political position: Centre-left to left-wing
- Colours: Blue and red
- Northern Irish seats in the House of Commons: 0 / 18
- Northern Ireland Assembly: 0 / 90
- Local government in Northern Ireland: 1 / 462

Website
- pupni.com

The Progressive Unionist Party (PUP) is a minor unionist political party in Northern Ireland. It was formed from the Independent Unionist Group operating in the Shankill area of Belfast, becoming the PUP in 1979. Linked to the Ulster Volunteer Force (UVF) and Red Hand Commando (RHC), for a time it described itself as "the only left of centre unionist party" in Northern Ireland, with its main support base in the loyalist working class communities of Belfast.

Since the Ulster Democratic Party's dissolution in 2001, the PUP has been the sole party in Northern Ireland representing paramilitary loyalism.

The PUP has one elected representative on the Causeway Coast and Glens Borough Council, Russell Watton, the party's current leader.

== History ==
The party was founded by Hugh Smyth in the mid-1970s as the "Independent Unionist Group" given the dissolution of the 1974 Volunteer Political Party. In 1977, two prominent members of the Northern Ireland Labour Party, David Overend and Jim McDonald, joined. Overend subsequently wrote many of the group's policy documents, incorporating much of the NILP's platform. In 1979, the group was renamed the "Progressive Unionist Party".

Their position on the left of the political spectrum differentiates them from other unionist parties (such as the Ulster Unionist Party and the Democratic Unionist Party) which are ideologically right-wing. The party has had a degree of electoral success. In 1994, PUP leader Hugh Smyth became Lord Mayor of Belfast.

=== Northern Ireland Peace Process ===
In 1995, shortly after the Combined Loyalist Military Command announced a ceasefire, former UVF member Billy Hutchinson, who was jailed for the murder of two Catholics in 1974, defined the relationship between the PUP and the UVF: "The relationship is a very strict one in terms of acting as political confidants and providing political analysis for them, but it doesn't go any deeper than that."

==== Northern Ireland Forum ====
The PUP participated in elections to the Northern Ireland Forum in May 1996. No constituency candidates were elected, but as one of the tenth best-performing parties on the list vote, they secured two seats, with Smyth and David Ervine both being elected.

The PUP supported the Belfast Agreement.

==== 1997 general and local elections ====
The PUP stood candidates for the first time at a general election in 1997: Hugh Smyth in South Antrim, Ervine in Belfast South and Kenny Donaldson in East Antrim. They amassed 10,928 votes, and no seats.

The party fared better at the simultaneous local elections, increasing their total number of councillors to seven. Ervine and Hutchinson joined Smyth in Belfast, and gains were made in North Down, Lisburn and Newtownabbey.

==== 1998 Northern Ireland Assembly election ====
Following the signing of the Good Friday Agreement, elections to the new Northern Ireland Assembly were held, which the PUP contested. Candidates included: Belfast councillors Smyth, Ervine and Billy Hutchinson, who stood in West, East and North Belfast, respectively.

They registered 20,634 votes (2.55%), and both Ervine and Hutchinson were elected to the Assembly. Notably, Smyth missed out on getting elected in West Belfast, in which no unionist candidates were returned in that constituency.

Incidentally, the Ulster Democratic Party failed to elect any candidates, making the PUP the only loyalist party to win representation in the Assembly.

=== Post-Good Friday Agreement ===
==== 1999 European Parliament elections ====
Ervine was the PUP candidate for the Northern Ireland constituency at the 1999 European elections. He polled 22,494 first-preference votes, and was not elected.

==== 2001 general and local elections ====
The PUP stood two candidates for the 2001 general election: Ervine in Belfast East, and Dawn Purvis in Belfast South. In total, the party received 4,781 votes (0.6%), and no seats. Ervine was the best-performing candidate out of the two, winning 10% of the vote in Belfast East, and the only one to retain their deposit.

The party held four of the seven seats they were defending at the concurrent local elections, but did make a gain in Castlereagh.

=== Ervine era ===
==== 2003 Assembly election ====
The PUP put up candidates for the 2003 Assembly election, including both Assembly members and Smyth.

Overall, their vote dropped by 1.2% to 8,032 votes — a large decline when compared to their success of over 20,000 votes in 1998. Hutchinson lost his seat, while Ervine held his. With no other candidates elected, this left Ervine as the PUP's only representative in the Assembly.

==== 2005 local elections and subsequent activity ====
The party made a poor showing at the 2005 local elections, losing half of their seats. This left Ervine and Smyth in Belfast as the only PUP candidates to be returned.

Following a loyalist feud between the UVF and Loyalist Volunteer Force, during which four men were murdered by the UVF in Belfast and recognition of the UVF's ceasefire was withdrawn by the British government, the PUP debated ending its "special relationship" with the UVF. This idea was defeated in a closed vote at the party's annual conference in October 2005.

In March 2006, the Chairwoman of the PUP, Dawn Purvis, a research-associate at the University of Ulster, was appointed as an independent member of the Northern Ireland Policing Board.

=== Death of David Ervine and Purvis leadership ===
David Ervine died following a heart attack on 8 January 2007. On 22 January 2007 Dawn Purvis was chosen as party leader. She is the second woman to lead a unionist party in Northern Ireland (after Anne Dickson's short-lived leadership of the Unionist Party of Northern Ireland following Brian Faulkner's retirement). Dr John Kyle was co-opted on to Belfast City Council to fill Ervine's seat.

==== 2007 Assembly election ====
The PUP fielded three candidates for the 2007 Assembly election: Elaine Martin in North Down, Andrew Park in Belfast South and Dawn Purvis in Belfast East. Overall the party polled 3,822 votes or 0.6% of the votes cast in Northern Ireland, down 0.6% from the elections of 2003.

Purvis retained her party's seat in Belfast East, while no other PUP candidates were elected.

==== 2010 resignations and relationship with UVF/RHC ====
The party did not field any candidates for the 2010 general elections - party members were encouraged to vote for a candidate of their choice.

In June 2010, Dawn Purvis resigned as leader, and as a member, of the party because of its relationship with the UVF and a recent murder attributed to that group. John Kyle was subsequently appointed interim leader, following Purvis's resignation. On 28 August 2010 the former deputy leader, David Rose, resigned from the party. He cited the recent murder attributed to the UVF and his belief that the party was "becoming increasingly conservative in outlook.

During a meeting in Belfast on 29 September 2010, members of the party agreed to maintain its relationship with the Ulster Volunteer Force and the Red Hand Commando. Despite the links with the UVF, Billy Hutchinson acknowledges that most UVF members vote for the larger Democratic Unionist Party.

=== 2011 local and Assembly elections and Brian Ervine's leadership ===
Brian Ervine was appointed PUP leader in October 2010.

At their manifesto launch for the 2011 Assembly and local elections, the PUP revealed their manifesto pledges, including: a balanced economy, greater integrated education and building a full-size replica of the RMS Titanic to be docked in Belfast Harbour. Additionally, Ervine announced that he would be standing in Belfast East, and that the party would be running local candidates in Larne, Castlereagh and Derry as well as in Belfast and Antrim.

No PUP candidates were elected to the Assembly, leaving the party without representation for the first time since 1998. Ervine himself finished behind Purvis who had run for re-election as an independent. She, too, was not elected.

Despite losing their Assembly seat, the PUP did return their two councillors in Belfast.

A month after the elections, Ervine announced his resignation as party leader, and later was replaced by veteran west Belfast activist Billy Hutchinson in October 2011.

=== Hutchinson leadership ===
Hutchinson succeeded Hugh Smyth on Belfast City Council in January 2014, following the latter's retirement due to ill health.

==== 2014 local elections ====
The PUP stood candidates for the new 'super councils' at the 2014 local elections, doubling their total number of representatives from two to four.

In Belfast, deputy leader John Kyle was re-elected, this time for the Titanic district, while Hutchinson topped the poll in Court. The party were also joined on the council by Julie Anne Corr-Johnston, who regained a seat in Oldpark for the party.

On the Causeway Coast and Glens Borough Council, Coleraine candidate, Russell Watton, was the first to be elected in that district.

Smyth died during the election campaign.

==== 2016 and 2017 Assembly elections ====
The PUP stood six candidates at the 2016 Assembly election, but, despite an increase in their overall vote, no candidates were elected.

Their support dipped slightly at the snap election in 2017, but did see an increase in their votes in North and East Belfast.

==== 2019 local elections ====
The party stood candidates at the 2019 local elections, including all four of their incumbent councillors. No further gains were made, with the party only losing their seat in Oldpark.

==== The Northern Ireland Protocol ====
Following the United Kingdom's withdrawal from the European Union, the PUP have been protesting against the Northern Ireland Protocol, part of the arrangements to prevent a 'hard border' in the Irish Sea. The party believes that the Protocol inhibits the Principle of consent, leading to Hutchinson saying that the PUP no longer support the Good Friday Agreement in November 2021.

Conversely, in an interview on BBC's The View programme, John Kyle stated that the Protocol could have "significant advantages" if "fundamental" changes are made. Kyle's remarks sparked outrage among unionists, with the PUP releasing a statement clarifying that the party still remains opposed to the Protocol, and that Kyle was giving a personal view.

Kyle subsequently resigned as both deputy leader and a member of the party three weeks later, citing "differing approaches" in regard to the Protocol.

==== 2022 Assembly election ====
The party stood only three candidates at the 2022 Assembly election, with Hutchinson standing in North Belfast, Russell Watton in East Londonderry and Karl Bennett in East Belfast.

No candidates were elected, with the PUP seeing a 52% drop in their support, compared to 2017.

==== 2023 local elections ====
The PUP had four candidates at the May local elections, with one candidate each across Belfast, Causeway Coast and Glens, Antrim and Newtownabbey and Mid and East Antrim.

The party polled 2,103 votes (0.3%) overall, and were wiped out in Belfast, with Hutchinson losing out to the Traditional Unionist Voice (TUV).

In the Causeway Coast and Glens, Watton retained his seat, making him the sole PUP candidate to be elected.

A month after the elections, Hutchinson resigned as leader, with Watton taking over the role.

== Notable members ==
Former UVF member Billy Giles, who spent 14 years in the Maze Prison for a sectarian killing, was part of the PUP's negotiating team at the Good Friday Agreement in April 1998. Others involved in this process included Billy Mitchell, David Ervine, Jim McDonald, William 'Billy' Greer, Winston Churchill Rea and William "Plum" Smyth; all former UVF and Red Hand Commando members.

== Party leaders ==
| Leader | | From | To |
|---|---|---|---|
| 1 | Hugh Smyth | 1979 | 2002 |
| 2 | David Ervine | 2002 | 2007 |
| 3 | Dawn Purvis | 2007 | 2010 |
| 4 | Brian Ervine | 2010 | 2011 |
| 5 | Billy Hutchinson | 2011 | 2023 |
| 6 | Russell Watton | 2023 | Incumbent |

== Electoral performance ==
=== UK general elections ===
==== 1997 UK general election ====
| Constituency | Candidate | Votes | % | Position |
|---|---|---|---|---|
| Belfast South | David Ervine | 5,687 | 14.4 | 3 |
| East Antrim | Billy Donaldson | 1,757 | 5.1 | 5 |
| South Antrim | Hugh Smyth | 3,490 | 9.0 | 4 |

==== 2001 UK general election ====
| Constituency | Candidate | Votes | % | Position |
|---|---|---|---|---|
| Belfast East | David Ervine | 3,669 | 10.0 | 4 |
| Belfast South | Dawn Purvis | 1,112 | 2.9 | 6 |

=== Northern Ireland Assembly ===
| Election | Seats won | ± | First Pref votes | % | ± |
|---|---|---|---|---|---|
| 1998 | 2 / 108 | Steady | 20,634 | 2.6% | Steady |
| 2003 | 1 / 108 | ▼1 | 8,032 | 1.2% | ▼1.4% |
| 2007 | 1 / 108 | Steady | 3,822 | 0.6% | ▼1.2% |
| 2011 | 0 / 108 | ▼1 | 1,493 | 0.2% | ▼0.4% |
| 2016 | 0 / 108 | Steady | 5,955 | 0.9% | ▲0.7% |
| 2017 | 0 / 90 | Steady | 5,590 | 0.7% | ▼0.2% |
| 2022 | 0 / 90 | Steady | 2,665 | 0.3% | ▼0.4% |

=== Local elections ===
| Election | Seats won | ± | First Pref votes | % | ± |
|---|---|---|---|---|---|
| 1981 | 1 / 526 | N/A | 3,057 | 0.5% | N/A |
| 1985 | 2 / 565 | ▲1 | 3,612 | 0.6% | ▲0.1 |
| 1989 | 3 / 565 | Steady | 3,839 | 0.6% | Steady |
| 1993 | 1 / 582 | ▼2 | 2,350 | 0.4% | ▼0.2 |
| 1997 | 7 / 582 | ▲6 | 12,051 | 2% | ▲1.6 |
| 2001 | 4 / 582 | ▼3 | 12,261 | 1.55% | ▼0.45 |
| 2005 | 2 / 582 | ▼2 | 4,591 | 0.7% | ▼0.85 |
| 2011 | 2 / 582 | Steady | 3,858 | 0.6% | ▼0.1 |
| 2014 | 4 / 462 | ▲1 | 12,753 | 2.0% | ▲1.4 |
| 2019 | 3 / 462 | ▼1 | 5,338 | 0.79% | ▼1.21 |
| 2023 | 1 / 462 | ▼2 | 2,103 | 0.3% | ▼0.5 |

== See also ==
- Northern Ireland Assembly
- 1998 Northern Ireland Assembly election
- 2003 Northern Ireland Assembly election
- 2007 Northern Ireland Assembly election
- 2011 Northern Ireland Assembly election
