= 2014 Belfast City Council election =

2014 Northern Irish local government election

- 22 May 2014

All 60 council seats 31 seats needed for a majority
- Turnout: 53.7%
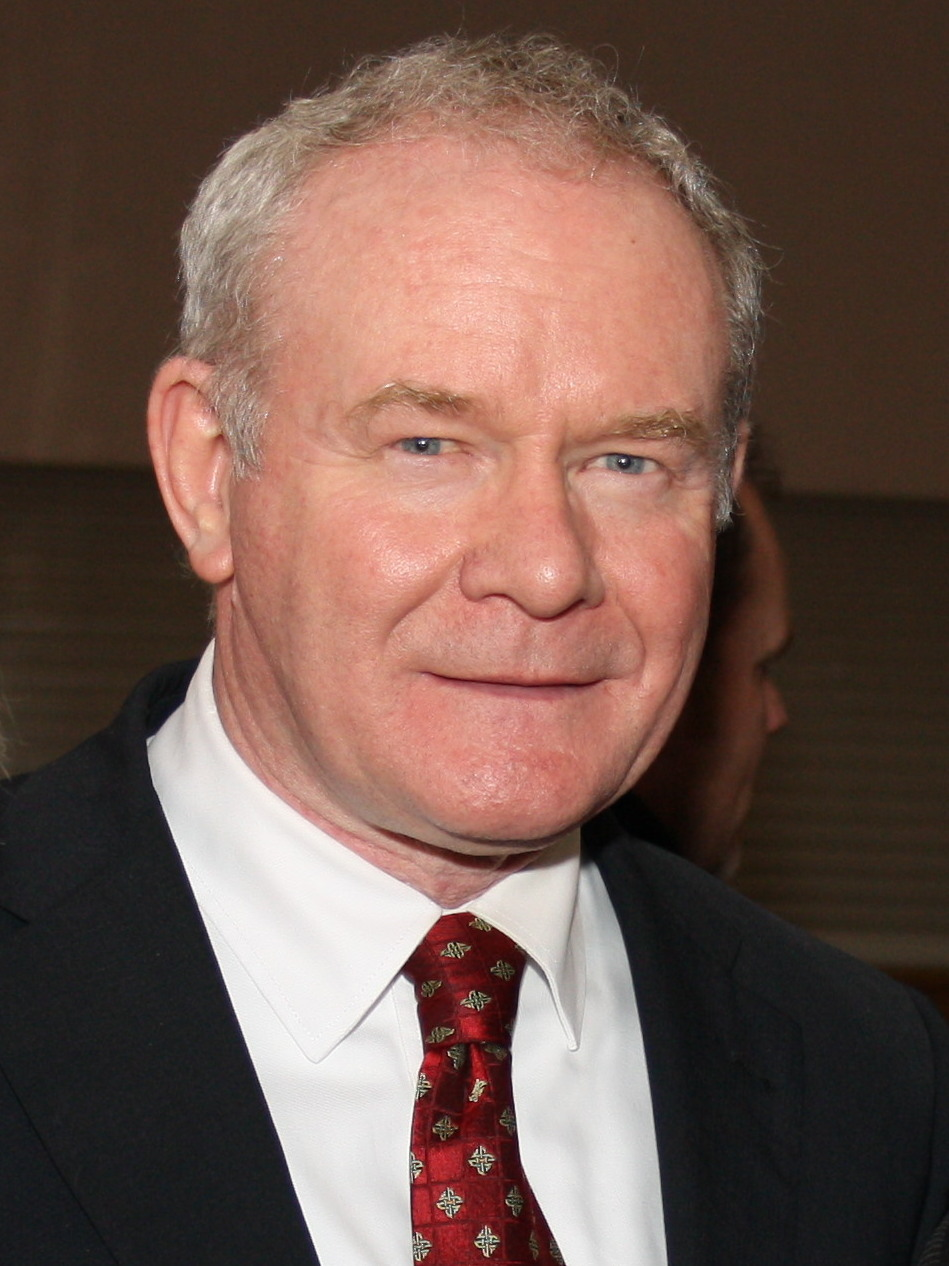

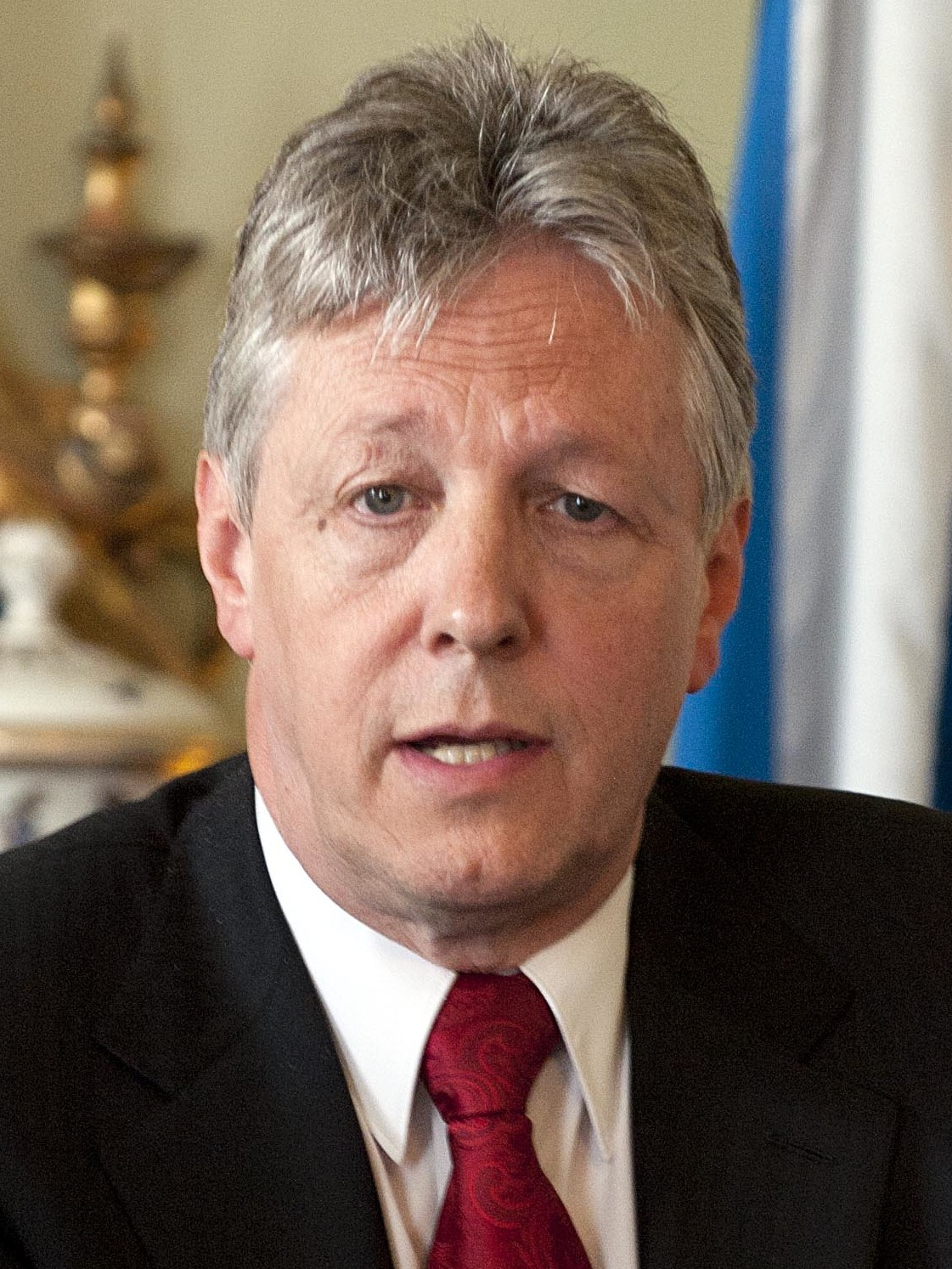

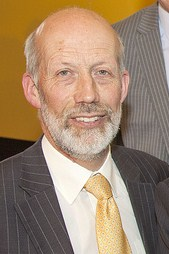

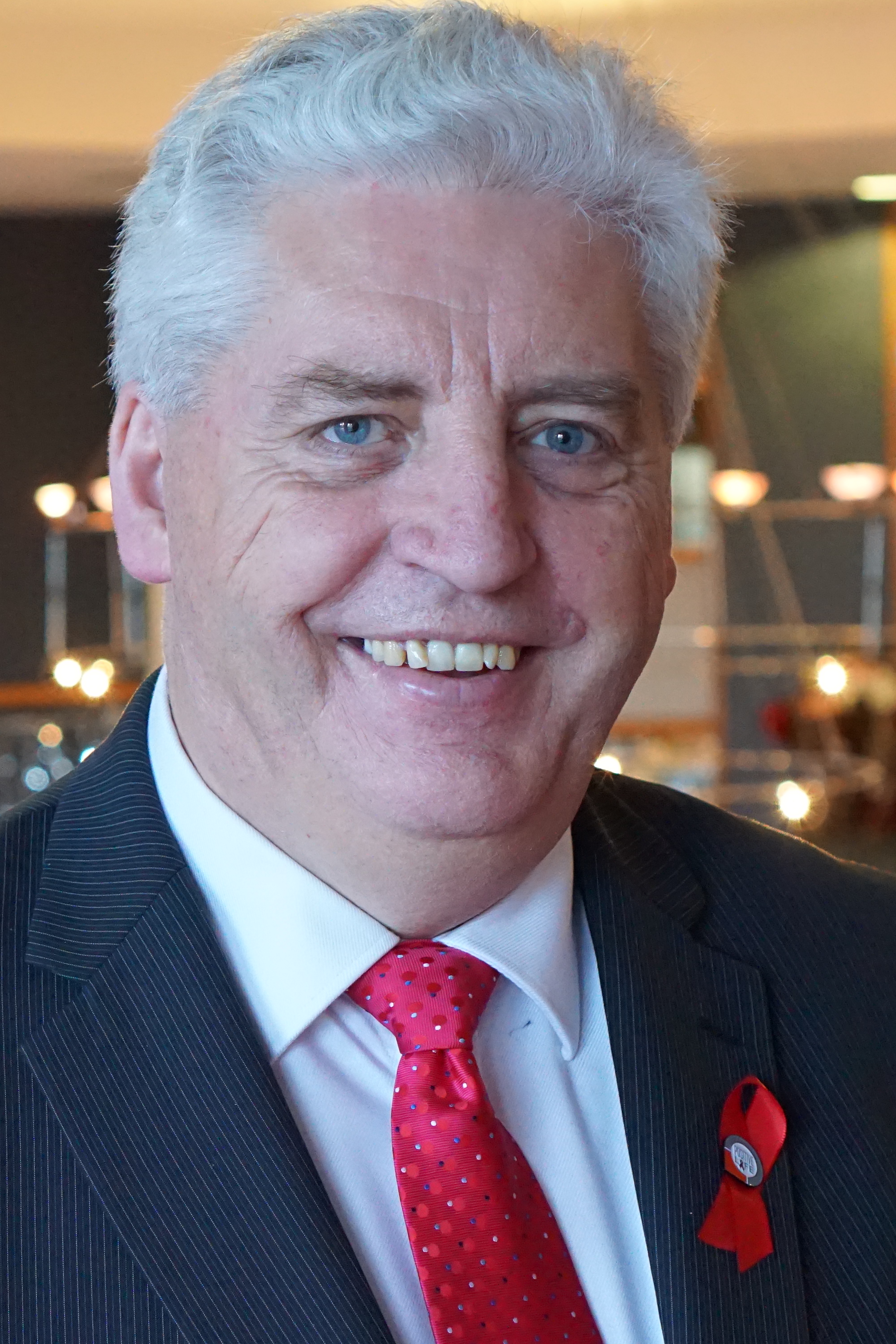

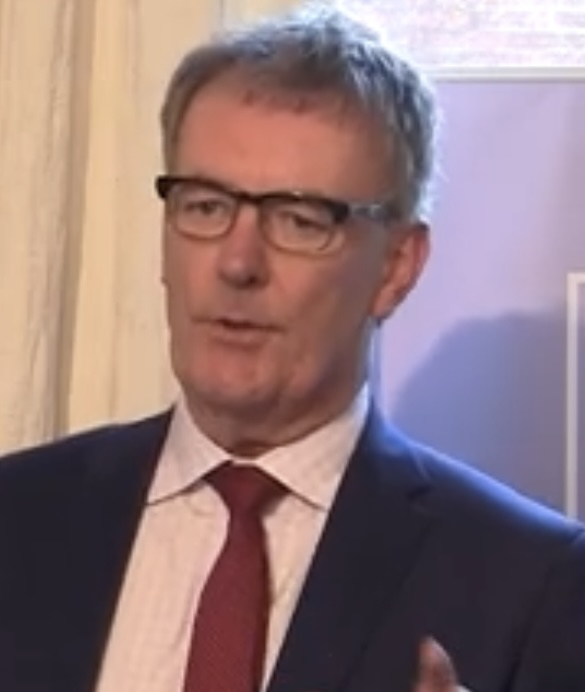
	First party	Second party	Third party
Leader	Martin McGuinness	Peter Robinson	David Ford
Party	Sinn Féin	DUP	Alliance
Seats won	19	13	8
Seat change	▲3	▼2	▲2
Popular vote	31,894	20,751	12,478
Percentage	29.2%	19.0%	11.4%
Swing	▼1.7%	▼4.4%	▼1.2%
	Fourth party	Fifth party	Sixth party
			PUP
Leader	Alasdair McDonnell	Mike Nesbitt	Billy Hutchinson
Party	SDLP	UUP	PUP
Seats won	7	7	3
Seat change	▼1	▲4	▲1
Popular vote	10,892	9,804	7,096
Percentage	10.0%	9.0%	6.5%
Swing	▼3.8%	▲0.4%	▲3.7%
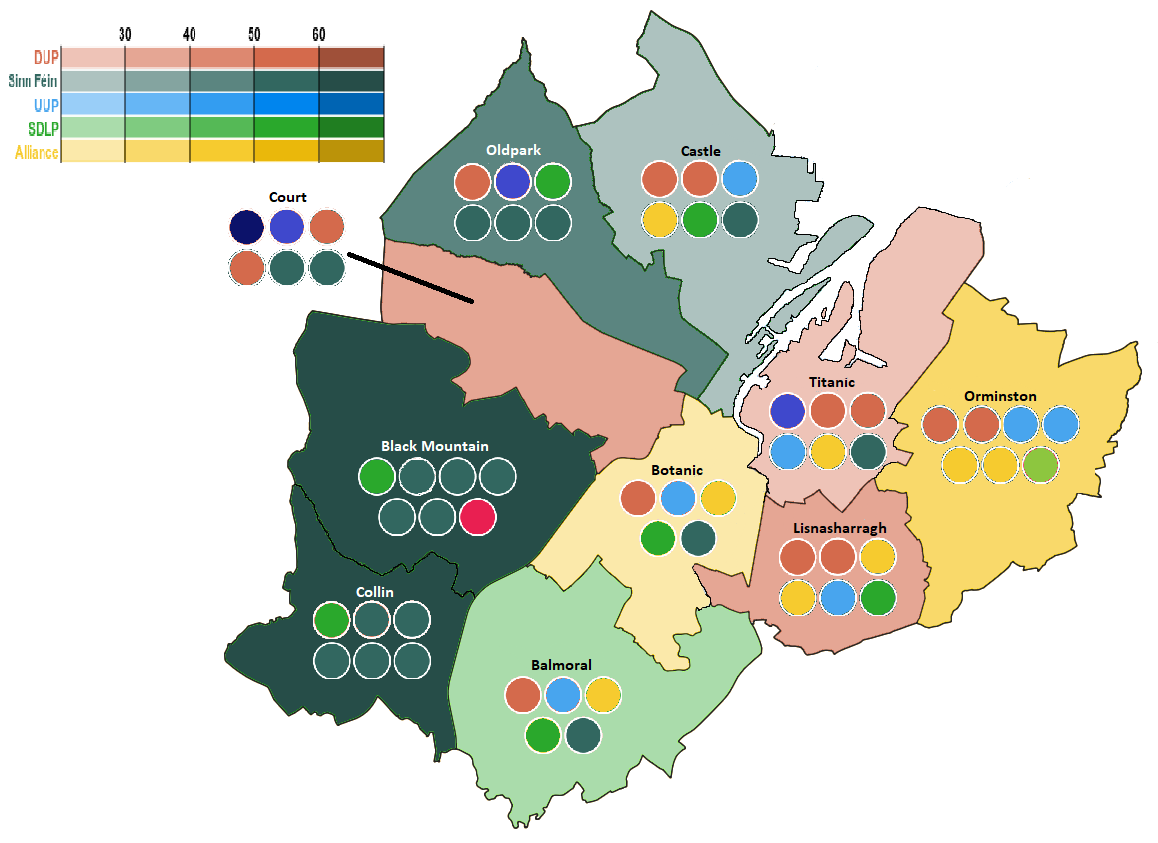
- Belfast 2014 Council Election Results by DEA (Shaded by plurality of FPVs)

Elections to Belfast City Council were held on 22 May 2014 – on the same day as other local government elections in Northern Ireland – as part of the process of local government reform provided for in the Local Government Act (Northern Ireland) 2014.

The councils elected in the 2014 local elections across Northern Ireland operated in shadow form for one year, with the 26 councils which they replaced existing in parallel. The local government reorganisation and electoral administration is founded by the Local Government Bill.

This reform saw the Belfast City Council area expand from 51 to 60 wards. Expansion saw some areas along the western, southern and eastern fringes of Belfast incorporated into the city, with a total of 53,000 additional residents and 21,000 households transferred from bordering council areas. A total of 60 councillors were elected.

Data derived from the Council website.

== Election results ==
Belfast local election result 2014
Party	Seats	Gains	Losses	Net gain/loss	Seats %	Votes %	Votes	+/−
Sinn Féin	19	4	1	▲3	31.7	29.2	31,894	▼1.7
DUP	13	4	2	▼2	21.7	19.0	20,751	▼4.4
Alliance	8	3	1	▲2	13.3	11.4	12,478	▼1.2
SDLP	7	1	2	▼1	11.7	10.0	10,892	▼3.8
UUP	7	4	0	▲4	11.7	9.0	9,804	▲0.4
PUP	3	1	0	▲1	5.0	6.5	7,096	▲3.7
TUV	1	1	0	▲1	1.7	2.6	2,883	▲2.2
Green (NI)	1	1	0	▲1	1.7	2.3	2,524	▲0.9
People Before Profit	1	1	0	▲1	1.7	1.5	1,691	▲1.1
NI21	0	0	0	0	0	2.7	2,953	New
Éirígí	0	0	0	0	0	1.6	1,756	▼0.7
UKIP	0	0	0	0	0	1.1	1,162	New
Independent	0	0	1	▼1	0	1.1	1,152	▼0.3
Workers' Party	0	0	0	0	0	0.9	985	▲0.1
Republican Network	0	0	0	0	0	0.5	502	New
NI Conservatives	0	0	0	0	0	0.3	361	▲0.2
Socialist Party	0	0	0	0	0	0.2	272	▼0.3

Note: "Votes" are the first preference votes.

== Districts summary ==
Results of the Belfast City Council election, 2014 by district
Ward	%	Cllrs	%	Cllrs	%	Cllrs	%	Cllrs	%	Cllrs	%	Cllrs	%	Cllrs	%	Cllrs	%	Cllrs	Total Cllrs
Ward	Sinn Féin		DUP		Alliance		SDLP		UUP		PUP		Green		TUV		Others		Total Cllrs
Balmoral	17.1	1	21.5	1	13.9	1	23.7	1	9.9	1	6.0	0	2.5	0	0.0	0	5.3	0	5
Black Mountain	68.0	5	0.0	0	0.8	0	10.0	1	0.0	0	0.0	0	0.0	0	0.0	0	21.2	1	7
Botanic	14.7	1	14.1	1	17.9	1	16.7	1	8.5	1	3.9	0	8.6	0	5.7	0	9.9	0	5
Castle	25.1	1	24.7	2	9.6	1	16.6	1	10.7	1	6.2	0	0.0	0	0.0	0	7.1	0	6
Collin	67.4	5	0.0	0	3.8	0	14.1	1	4.3	0	0.0	0	0.0	0	0.0	0	10.3	0	6
Court	24.0	2	31.0	2	1.1	0	4.9	0	5.7	0	19.8	1	0.0	0	7.3	1	6.3	0	6
Lisnasharragh	6.1	0	32.8	2	24.6	2	8.4	1	13.0	1	6.0	0	4.6	0	0.0	0	4.5	0	6
Oldpark	44.6	3	18.1	1	3.0	0	8.8	1	3.5	0	7.3	1	0.0	0	3.0	0	11.6	0	6
Ormiston	0.4	0	26.4	2	27.1	2	0.7	0	19.3	2	5.5	0	6.4	1	4.9	0	9.2	0	7
Titanic	11.7	1	26.1	2	15.1	2	1.0	0	16.7	1	11.6	1	2.1	0	5.8	0	9.8	0	6
Total	29.2	19	19.0	13	11.4	8	10.0	7	9.0	7	6.5	3	2.3	1	2.6	1	10.0	1	60

== District results ==
=== Balmoral ===
2014: 1 x SDLP, 1 x DUP, 1 x Sinn Féin, 1 x Alliance, 1 x UUP

Balmoral - 5 seats
Party	Candidate	FPv%	Count									
Party	Candidate	FPv%	1	2	3	4	5	6	7	8	9	10
Sinn Féin	Máirtín Ó Muilleoir* †	17.13%	1,525									
SDLP	Claire Hanna* †	17.12%	1,524									
Alliance	Paula Bradshaw †	9.06%	806	809.66	812.42	830.6	896.05	986.43	989.46	1,435.23	1,748.23	
DUP	Christopher Stalford* †	10.88%	968	968.36	968.52	981.54	986.54	1,000.54	1,233.58	1,234.58	1,247.47	1,256.5
UUP	Jeffrey Dudgeon	9.86%	878	878	878.2	908.2	917.2	955.22	1,129.22	1,141.26	1,170.51	1,191.5
DUP	Sarah Clarke	10.67%	950	950.09	950.23	956.23	957.23	966.23	1,063.23	1,069.25	1,083.16	1,090.2
SDLP	Justin Cartwright	6.62%	589	613.93	635.39	648.8	690.62	740.48	746.5	810.83		
Alliance	Jamie Doyle	4.83%	430	434.71	437.47	454.65	515.39	594.08	601.13			
PUP	Simon Rice	5.99%	533	533.03	533.11	544.11	546.11	553.14				
NI21	Tina McKenzie	2.88%	256	257.38	258.32	325.81	349.12					
Green (NI)	Elli Kontorravdis	2.52%	224	226.73	227.47	251.63						
NI21	Barbara Neeson	0.83%	74	74.6	74.8							
NI Conservatives	David Timson	0.83%	74	74.18	74.22							
Independent	Gerard Collins	0.79%	70	70.57	70.81							
Electorate: 17,107 Valid: 8,901 (52.03%) Spoilt: 131 Quota: 1,484 Turnout: 9,032 (52.80%)

=== Black Mountain ===
2014: 5 x Sinn Féin, 1 x People Before Profit, 1 x SDLP

Black Mountain - 7 seats
Party	Candidate	FPv%	Count						
Party	Candidate	FPv%	1	2	3	4	5	6	7
Sinn Féin	Steven Corr*	12.86%	1,793						
Sinn Féin	Janice Austin*†	12.80%	1,784						
People Before Profit	Gerry Carroll †	12.13%	1,691	1,789					
Sinn Féin	Emma Groves*	11.68%	1,628	1,637	1,757				
Sinn Féin	Arder Carson*	10.82%	1,509	1,527	1,628	1,629.68	1,634.18	1,636.12	1,641.44
SDLP	Tim Attwood*	9.02%	1,258	1,452	1,596	1,597.18	1,631.68	1,632.72	1,634.26
Sinn Féin	Ciarán Beattie*	9.61%	1,340	1,369	1,472	1,501.46	1,504.46	1,534.22	1,538.14
Sinn Féin	Caoimhín Mhic Giolla Mhin*	10.24%	1,428	1,450	1,521	1,522.3	1,526.05	1,527.19	1,529.71
Éirígí	Pádraic MacCoitir	7.36%	1,026	1,040					
Workers' Party	Joanne Lowry	1.14%	159						
SDLP	Gerard McDonald	0.95%	133						
Alliance	Lauren Gray	0.79%	110						
NI21	Chris Valente	0.60%	83						
Electorate: 25,146 Valid: 13,942 (55.44%) Spoilt: 369 Quota: 1,743 Turnout: 14,311 (56.91%)

=== Botanic ===
2014: 1 x Alliance, 1 x SDLP, 1 x Sinn Féin, 1 x DUP, 1 x UUP

Botanic - 5 seats
Party	Candidate	FPv%	Count										
Party	Candidate	FPv%	1	2	3	4	5	6	7	8	9	10	11
DUP	Ruth Patterson* ‡–	14.10%	1,268	1,268	1,280	1,282	1,284	1,508					
Alliance	Emmet McDonough-Brown	9.37%	843	850	865	881	925	925	1,011	1,061	1,065	1,706	
Sinn Féin	Deirdre Hargey*	14.74%	1,326	1,343	1,346	1,370	1,377	1,378	1,393	1,479	1,483	1,520	
SDLP	Declan Boyle ‡	10.80%	971	978	983	992	1,007	1,009	1,034	1,344	1,347	1,405	1,473.4
UUP	Graham Craig ‡	8.52%	766	767	795	798	808	858	897	900	1,333	1,357	1,380.6
Green (NI)	Clare Bailey	8.58%	772	792	806	860	876	879	973	994	1,010	1,141	1,253.8
Alliance	Duncan Morrow	8.55%	769	770	775	787	812	815	878	929	939		
TUV	Billy Dickson	5.66%	509	509	516	519	521	579	588	593			
SDLP	Patrick McCarthy*	5.89%	530	545	552	559	565	565	576				
NI21	Eileen Chan-Hu	2.90%	261	264	271	278	398	400					
PUP	Ewan Suttie	3.90%	351	351	353	356	357						
NI21	Ben Matthews	2.59%	233	235	247	254							
Socialist Party	Paddy Meehan	1.82%	164	172	173								
NI Conservatives	Ben Manton	1.39%	125	127									
Workers' Party	Paddy Lynn	1.18%	106										
Electorate: 19,462 Valid: 8,994 (46.21%) Spoilt: 192 Quota: 1,500 Turnout: 9,186 (47.20%)

=== Castle ===
2014: 2 x DUP, 1 x Sinn Féin, 1 x SDLP, 1 x UUP, 1 x Alliance

Castle - 6 seats
Party	Candidate	FPv%	Count						
Party	Candidate	FPv%	1	2	3	4	5	6	7
Sinn Féin	Mary Ellen Campbell*	15.31%	1,619						
SDLP	Patrick Convery* ‡	11.32%	1,197	1,206.6	1,229.66	1,335.9	1,756.9		
Alliance	Nuala McAllister	9.64%	1,020	1,021.8	1,064.86	1,261.1	1,388.58	1,410.58	1,549.18
DUP	Guy Spence*	12.66%	1,339	1,339.12	1,340.12	1,356.12	1,357.12	1,493.12	1,493.89
DUP	Lydia Patterson*	12.06%	1,276	1,276.18	1,277.18	1,287.18	1,295.18	1,463.18	1,467.03
UUP	David Browne*	10.71%	1,133	1,133.12	1,136.12	1,158.12	1,163.12	1,459.12	1,465.28
Sinn Féin	Tierna Cunningham*	9.81%	1,038	1,117.14	1,144.38	1,216.4	1,258.48	1,259.48	1,352.65
PUP	William McQuade	6.21%	657	657	659	673	677		
SDLP	Cathal Mullaghan	5.24%	554	555.98	596.98	651.28			
NI21	Alison Crawford	3.18%	336	337.08	343.08				
Independent	Fra Hughes	2.06%	218	219.02	245.02				
Workers' Party	Gemma Weir	1.81%	191	191.48					
Electorate: 20,977 Valid: 10,578 (50.43%) Spoilt: 175 Quota: 1,512 Turnout: 10,753 (51.26%)

=== Collin ===
2014: 5 x Sinn Féin, 1 x SDLP

Collin - 6 seats
Party	Candidate	FPv%	Count						
Party	Candidate	FPv%	1	2	3	4	5	6	7
Sinn Féin	David Bell*†	14.96%	1,669						
Sinn Féin	Stephen Magennis*	14.50%	1,618						
SDLP	Brian Heading*	9.56%	1,067	1,069.68	1,069.90	1,216.19	1,246.19	1,624.19	
Sinn Féin	Matt Garrett*	13.01%	1,452	1,504.56	1,504.84	1,540.24	1,545.24	1,579.50	1,708.50
Sinn Féin	Charlene O'Hara*	13.23%	1,476	1,479.40	1,493.43	1,507.56	1,512.61	1,544.89	1,658.89
Sinn Féin	Bill Groves* †	11.72%	1,308	1,310.40	1,311.08	1,315.16	1,315.31	1,336.41	1,427.69
NI21	Wendy Burke	3.83%	427	427.56	427.58	514.70	753.74	802.75	806.82
Éirígí	Máire Drumm	6.54%	730	731.76	732.06	740.19	744.19	751.30	
SDLP	Laura Whinnery	4.58%	511	511.68	511.89	571.94	601.94		
UUP	Gareth Martin	4.27%	476	476.08	476.24	486.24			
Alliance	Gerard Catney	3.80%	424	425.24	425.28				
Electorate: 20,017 Valid: 11,158 (50.68%) Spoilt: 202 Quota: 1,512 Turnout: 11,360 (51.60%)

=== Court ===
2014: 2 x DUP, 2 x Sinn Féin, 1 x PUP, 1 x TUV

Court - 6 seats
Party	Candidate	FPv%	Count											
Party	Candidate	FPv%	1	2	3	4	5	6	7	8	9	10	11	12
PUP	Billy Hutchinson*	14.55%	1,674											
DUP	Frank McCoubrey*	13.53%	1,557	1,557	1,569	1,569	1,570	1,769						
DUP	Brian Kingston*	9.86%	1,134	1,136	1,154	1,154	1,157	1,207	1,311.58	1,313.63	1,715.63			
Sinn Féin	Mary McConville	12.17%	1,400	1,400	1,419	1,485	1,533	1,535	1,535	1,535.02	1,536.02	1,536.02	1,539.04	1,732.04
Sinn Féin	Jim McVeigh* †	11.79%	1,357	1,357	1,362	1,398	1,410	1,411	1,411	1,411.01	1,412.01	1,412.3	1,413.32	1,547.33
TUV	Jolene Bunting ‡	7.29%	839	842	852	854	856	865	865.63	866.51	888.87	905.88	1,123.89	1,135.16
UUP	Bill Manwaring	5.66%	651	653	674	675	677	685	688.78	689.85	754.69	785.74	1,098.7	1,117.8
SDLP	Colin Keenan*	4.89%	563	566	635	697	809	809	809	809.04	812.67	813.75	818.31	
PUP	Billy Mawhinney	5.28%	607	610	621	621	625	629	631.52	643.17	713.41	734.47		
DUP	Nicola Verner*	4.49%	516	516	519	519	521	609	621.6	622.26				
DUP	Naomi Thompson*	3.17%	365	366	366	368	369							
Workers' Party	John Lowry	2.57%	296	297	319	334								
Republican Network	Tommy Doherty	2.45%	282	282	284									
Alliance	Sheila Gallagher	1.12%	129	130										
NI21	Stuart Hunter	1.02%	117	117										
Independent	Willie Faulkner	0.16%	18											
Electorate: 20,881 Valid: 11,505 (55.10%) Spoilt: 304 Quota: 1,644 Turnout: 11,809 (56.55%)

=== Lisnasharragh ===
2014: 2 x DUP, 2 x Alliance, 1 x UUP, 1 x SDLP

Lisnasharragh - 6 seats
Party	Candidate	FPv%	Count								
Party	Candidate	FPv%	1	2	3	4	5	6	7	8	9
Alliance	Michael Long*	16.44%	1,726								
DUP	Aileen Graham	14.73%	1,546								
UUP	Chris McGimpsey*	12.98%	1,362	1,370.19	1,384.2	1,432.1	1,462.4	1,464.37	1,764.37		
Alliance	Carole Howard*	8.19%	860	1,016.52	1,032.7	1,157.2	1,412.4	1,413.24	1,427.5	1,547.5	
SDLP	Kate Mullan* ‡	8.36%	878	899.58	901.71	931.88	1,019.8	1,019.89	1,029.89	1,500.89	
DUP	Tommy Sandford*	9.34%	980	983.12	994.12	1,013.3	1,024.3	1,041.8	1,226.43	1,230.69	1,354.69
DUP	Colin Hussey	8.73%	916	918.34	927.47	944.6	960.6	985.59	1,071.68	1,071.68	1,152.68
Sinn Féin	Dermot Kennedy	6.07%	637	642.59	642.59	649.85	693.11	693.11	697.14		
PUP	Helen Smyth	6.00%	630	631.04	641.04	660.17	684.3	684.72			
Green (NI)	Connal Hughes	4.62%	485	497.35	503.48	590.17					
NI21	Leah McDonnell	3.00%	315	323.45	414.71						
NI21	Pete Wray	1.54%	162	163.82							
Electorate: 20,089 Valid: 10,497 (52.25%) Spoilt: 159 Quota: 1,500 Turnout: 10,656 (53.04%)

=== Oldpark ===
2014: 3 x Sinn Féin, 1 x DUP, 1 x SDLP, 1 x PUP

Oldpark - 6 seats
Party	Candidate	FPv%	Count											
Party	Candidate	FPv%	1	2	3	4	5	6	7	8	9	10	11	12
Sinn Féin	Mary Clarke	14.80%	1,559											
Sinn Féin	J.J. Magee*	11.77%	1,240	1,250	1,260	1,263.18	1,263.18	1,275.2	1,279.3	1,831.3				
Sinn Féin	Gerry McCabe* †	11.46%	1,207	1,214	1,226	1,229.69	1,229.69	1,239.7	1,239.7	1,341	1,627.4			
DUP	Gareth McKee* †	10.81%	1,139	1,141	1,141	1,141.03	1,213.03	1,234	1,437	1,438.1	1,438.1	2,116.1		
PUP	Julie-Anne Corr	7.35%	774	788	788	788.12	899.12	907.15	1,031.2	1,031.2	1,031.2	1,163.2	1,658.2	
SDLP	Nichola Mallon* †	8.76%	923	955	970	972.73	972.73	1,110.8	1,119.8	1,176.7	1,204.6	1,211.6	1,219.6	1,247.6
Independent	Dee Fennell	8.03%	846	859	980	982.55	984.55	1,004.6	1,008.6	1,035.1	1,042.5	1,046.5	1,050.5	1,086.5
DUP	Lee Reynolds*	7.25%	764	768	768	768	802	817	888	889	889			
Sinn Féin	John Loughran	6.62%	697	711	730	763.39	763.39	782.48	784.48					
UUP	Colin Houston	3.47%	366	371	372	372.03	461.03	481.03						
Alliance	Peter McReynolds	3.04%	320	347	349	349.3	352.3							
TUV	Wayne Gilmour	3.01%	317	320	320	320								
Republican Network	Sammy Cusick	2.09%	220	231										
Workers' Party	Christopher Bailie	1.55%	163											
Electorate: 20,888 Valid: 10,535 (50.44%) Spoilt: 258 Quota: 1,506 Turnout: 10,793 (51.67%)

=== Ormiston ===
2014: 2 x Alliance, 2 x DUP, 2 x UUP, 1 x Green

Ormiston - 7 seats
Party	Candidate	FPv%	Count												
Party	Candidate	FPv%	1	2	3	4	5	6	7	8	9	10	11	12	13
UUP	Jim Rodgers*	14.53%	1,899												
Alliance	Mervyn Jones* †	9.06%	1,184	1,188.48	1,222.48	1,231.76	1,298.76	1,356.46	1,367.46	1,378.6	1,412.6	1,418.6	1,898.74		
Alliance	Laura McNamee* †	6.87%	898	902.2	923.2	929.34	980.34	1,405.6	1,407.6	1,414.6	1,425.6	1,438.7	1,781.74		
UUP	Peter Johnston	4.76%	622	768.58	769.72	812.54	877.22	887.06	1,035.16	1,081.22	1,231.18	1,478.5	1,501.18	1,607.8	1,639.76
DUP	Tom Haire*	8.20%	1,072	1,083.62	1,083.62	1,088.76	1,101.9	1,101.9	1,173.6	1,297.28	1,467.26	1,568.8	1,581.8	1,583.99	1,585.35
DUP	John Hussey*	6.28%	821	830.94	830.94	837.36	849.36	849.36	917.34	1,346.96	1,424.5	1,544	1,555.04	1,560.15	1,568.31
Green (NI)	Ross Brown †	6.36%	831	836.18	853.18	872.32	970.02	996.3	1,015.3	1,038.58	1,108.14	1,158.7	1,270.26	1,408.96	1,506.88
DUP	Denny Vitty*	6.19%	809	834.9	836.9	847.46	860.46	864.46	907.88	1,020.56	1,078.84	1,304.48	1,318.04	1,328.99	1,334.43
Alliance	Ross McMullan	6.88%	899	902.5	949.5	950.78	987.78	1,063.48	1,066.48	1,077.9	1,090.9	1,102.04			
PUP	Ian Shanks	5.51%	720	728.96	729.96	737.24	745.38	746.52	824.66	835.36	938.2				
UKIP	Stephen Crosby	4.73%	618	623.04	624.04	639.04	660.18	664.18	820.44	834					
DUP	Brian Kennedy*	5.74%	750	763.72	765.72	773.56	780.7	783.98	811.68						
TUV	John Hiddleston	4.90%	640	647	648	654	657.14	658.14							
Alliance	Andrew Webb*	4.29%	561	565.76	572.76	581.9	611.9								
NI21	Ian Dickson	1.87%	245	246.82	248.82	255.82									
NI21	Jayne Olorunda	1.47%	192	193.4	195.4	203.54									
NI Conservatives	Ian Reid	1.24%	162	167.74	168.74										
SDLP	Michael McMillan	0.73%	95	95											
Sinn Féin	Laura Keenan	0.43%	56	56.14											
Electorate: 20,881 Valid: 13,074 (62.61%) Spoilt: 118 Quota: 1,635 Turnout: 13,192 (63.18%)

=== Titanic ===
2014: 2 x DUP, 1 x UUP, 1 x Alliance, 1 x Sinn Féin, 1 x PUP

Titanic - 6 seats
Party	Candidate	FPv%	Count									
Party	Candidate	FPv%	1	2	3	4	5	6	7	8	9	10
UUP	Sonia Copeland	16.68%	1,651									
PUP	John Kyle*	11.62%	1,150	1,237.92	1,239.92	1,239.92	1,259.18	1,273.6	1,308.14	1,325.4	1,454.4	
DUP	Adam Newton*	10.27%	1,017	1,043.74	1,044.74	1,046.88	1,056.02	1,061.02	1,082.72	1,351.1	1,428.1	
DUP	Gavin Robinson* †	11.60%	1,148	1,179.78	1,179.78	1,181.78	1,187.92	1,191.92	1,205.34	1,322	1,418.04	
Sinn Féin	Niall Ó Donnghaile* †	11.68%	1,156	1,156	1,183	1,198	1,207	1,211.14	1,218.14	1,218.14	1,222.14	1,228.7
Alliance	David Armitage	7.88%	780	783.92	785.92	803.92	816.2	872.34	969.04	972.04	990.04	1,031.44
Alliance	Máire Hendron*	7.26%	719	721.66	726.66	761.66	772.8	821.94	890.08	892.08	903.08	929.62
TUV	Harry Toan	5.84%	578	606.56	607.56	607.56	610.98	615.98	624.52	634.52	793.78	
UKIP	Jonny Lavery	5.49%	544	564.72	566.72	569.86	577	587.14	603.56	610.98		
DUP	Sam White	4.20%	416	423.7	423.84	423.84	426.84	431.84	433.12			
NI21	Jimmy Davidson	2.55%	252	257.88	257.88	261.88	271.16	311.3				
Green (NI)	Gregor Claus	2.14%	212	213.26	215.26	221.26	242.4					
Socialist Party	Tommy Black	1.09%	108	111.5	113.5	120.5						
SDLP	Peter Devlin	1.00%	99	99.42	106.42							
Workers' Party	Kevin McNally	0.71%	70	70.14								
Electorate: 21,425 Valid: 9,900 (46.21%) Spoilt: 182 Quota: 1,415 Turnout: 10,082 (47.06%)

* Incumbent

== Changes during the term ==
=== † Co-options ===
Date co-opted	Electoral Area	Party	Outgoing	Co-optee	Reason
29 Oct 2014	Balmoral	Sinn Féin	Máirtín Ó Muilleoir	Geraldine McAteer	Ó Muilleoir was co-opted to the NI Assembly.
16 Jun 2015	Titanic	DUP	Gavin Robinson	Brian Kennedy	Robinson was elected to the House of Commons.
28 Jul 2015	Balmoral	SDLP	Claire Hanna	Donal Lyons	Hanna was co-opted to the NI Assembly.
1 Sep 2015	Ormiston	Alliance	Laura McNamee	Sian O'Neill	McNamee resigned.
14 Sep 2015	Collin	Sinn Féin	Bill Groves	Séanna Walsh	Groves resigned.
24 May 2016	Black Mountain	People Before Profit	Gerry Carroll	Matthew Collins	Carroll was elected to the NI Assembly.
26 May 2016	Titanic	Sinn Féin	Niall Ó Donnghaile	Mairéad O'Donnell	Ó Donnghaile was elected to the Seanad Éireann.
27 May 2016	Balmoral	DUP	Christopher Stalford	Lee Reynolds	Stalford was elected to the NI Assembly.
23 May 2016	Oldpark	SDLP	Nichola Mallon	Paul McCusker	Mallon was elected to the NI Assembly
3 Jun 2016	Balmoral	Alliance	Paula Bradshaw	Kate Nicholl	Bradshaw was elected to the NI Assembly
26 Jun 2016	Ormiston	Alliance	Mervyn Jones	Peter McReynolds	Jones died
1 Nov 2016	Titanic	DUP	Brian Kennedy	George Dorrian	Kennedy resigned
16 Nov 2016	Ormiston	Green (NI)	Ross Brown	Georgina Milne	Brown resigned
19 Oct 2017	Black Mountain	Sinn Féin	Janice Austin	Orla Nic Biorna	Austin resigned
6 Nov 2017	Collin	Sinn Féin	David Bell	Danny Baker	Bell resigned
11 Jan 2018	Oldpark	Sinn Féin	Gerry McCabe	Ryan Murphy	McCabe resigned.
11 Jan 2018	Court	Sinn Féin	Jim McVeigh	Claire Canavan	McVeigh resigned.
27 Jan 2018	Oldpark	DUP	Gareth McKee	Dale Pankhurst	McKee resigned.
14 Dec 2018	Court	Sinn Féin	Mary McConville	Christina Black	McConville resigned

=== ‡ Changes in affiliation ===
Date	Electoral Area	Name	Previous affiliation	New affiliation	Circumstance
21 Nov 2015	Botanic	Ruth Patterson	DUP	Independent	Expelled.
28 Oct 2016	Botanic	Graham Craig	UUP	DUP	Defected.
28 Feb 2017	Court	Jolene Bunting	TUV	Independent	Resigned.
19 Jun 2017	Botanic	Declan Boyle	SDLP	Independent	Resigned.
19 Jun 2017	Castle	Patrick Convery	SDLP	Independent	Resigned.
19 Jun 2017	Lisnasharragh	Kate Mullan	SDLP	Independent	Resigned.

=== – Suspensions ===
Ruth Patterson (Independent) was suspended from the council from 4 March 2019 to the end of her term in May.

Last update 24 March 2019.

Current composition: see Belfast City Council.
