= 2019 Belfast City Council election =

Northern Ireland local election

- 2 May 2019

All 60 council seats 31 seats needed for a majority
	First party	Second party	Third party
Leader	Ciaran Beattie	Lee Reynolds	Michael Long
Party	Sinn Féin	DUP	Alliance
Leader's seat	Black Mountain	Titanic (defeated)	Lisnasharragh
Seats before	19	13	8
Seats won	18	15	10
Seat change	▼1	▲2	▲2
	Fourth party	Fifth party	Sixth party
Leader	Tim Attwood	Georgina Milne	Matthew Collins
Party	SDLP	Green (NI)	People Before Profit
Leader's seat	Did not stand	Did not stand	Black Mountain
Seats before	7	1	1
Seats won	6	4	3
Seat change	▼1	▲3	▲2
	Seventh party	Eighth party
Leader	David Browne	Billy Hutchinson
Party	UUP	PUP
Leader's seat	Castle (defeated)	Court
Seats before	7	3
Seats won	2	2
Seat change	▼5	▼1
- First preference vote and seat totals by local electoral area. As this is a STV election, seat totals are determined by popular vote and preferences in each district electoral area.
Council control before election
No overall control
Council control after election
No overall control

The 2019 election to Belfast City Council, part of the Northern Ireland local elections on 2 May 2019, returned 60 members to the council via Single Transferable Vote.

== Election results ==
Belfast local election result 2019
Party	Seats	Gains	Losses	Net gain/loss	Seats %	Votes %	Votes	+/−
Sinn Féin	18	1	2	▼1	30.0	28.2	31,771	▼1.0
DUP	15	2	0	▲2	25.0	21.6	24,317	▲2.6
Alliance	10	2	0	▲2	16.7	15.7	17,683	▲4.3
SDLP	6	0	1	▼1	10.0	9.1	10,225	▼0.9
Green (NI)	4	3	0	▲3	6.7	6.0	6,785	▲3.7
People Before Profit	3	2	0	▲2	5.0	5.2	5,888	▲3.7
UUP	2	0	5	▼5	3.3	6.2	6,987	▼2.8
PUP	2	0	1	▼1	3.3	3.1	3,458	▼3.4
Independent	0	0	0	0	0.0	1.8	2,065	▲0.7
Aontú	0	0	0	0	0.0	1.3	1,420	New
Workers' Party	0	0	0	0	0.0	0.7	773	▼0.2
UKIP	0	0	0	0	0.0	0.7	751	▼0.4
TUV	0	0	1	▼1	0.0	0.3	341	▼2.3
South Belfast Unionists	0	0	0	0	0.0	0.2	233	New
Labour Alternative	0	0	0	0	0.0	0.1	160	New

Note: "Votes" are the first preference votes.

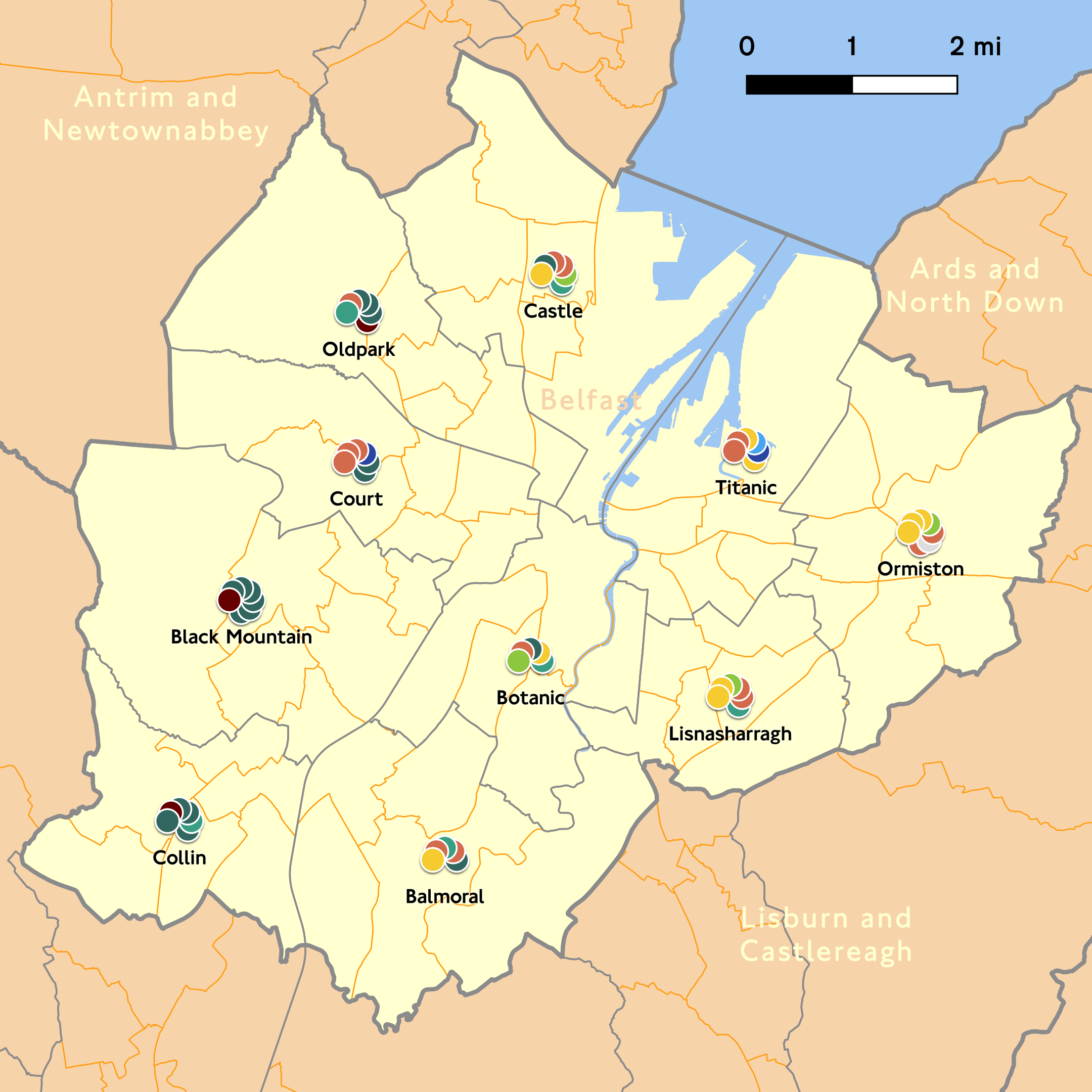
Map showing seats currently held by each party in each DEA, in order elected.

== Districts summary ==
Results of the Belfast City Council election, 2019 by district
Ward	%	Cllrs	%	Cllrs	%	Cllrs	%	Cllrs	%	Cllrs	%	Cllrs	%	Cllrs	%	Cllrs	%	Cllrs	Total Cllrs
Ward	Sinn Féin		DUP		Alliance		SDLP		Green		PBP		UUP		PUP		Others		Total Cllrs
Balmoral	13.9	1	26.8	2	20.0	1	23.0	1	5.5	0	2.2	0	7.2	0	0.0	0	1.4	0	5
Black Mountain	68.8	6	0.0	0	1.5	0	5.6	0	1.5	0	16.1	1	0.0	0	0.0	0	6.5	0	7
Botanic	16.0	1	20.3	1	19.5	1	10.4	1	14.4	1	3.9	0	3.3	0	1.7	0	10.4	0	5
Castle	24.4	1	25.2	2	15.8	1	10.6	1	7.8	1	1.8	0	9.0	0	0.0	0	5.4	0	6
Collin	63.3	4	2.6	0	3.7	0	8.0	1	2.0	0	12.9	1	1.1	0	0.0	0	6.4	0	6
Court	25.1	2	44.2	3	2.2	0	2.6	0	1.3	0	6.1	0	3.4	0	8.2	1	6.9	0	6
Lisnasharragh	5.6	0	27.9	2	28.8	2	8.9	1	11.1	1	1.2	0	8.3	0	3.3	0	4.7	0	6
Oldpark	37.3	3	20.1	1	3.4	0	25.2	1	2.0	0	3.9	1	2.1	0	5.1	0	0.8	0	6
Ormiston	0.4	0	27.0	2	41.8	3	0.0	0	9.8	1	0.0	0	16.4	1	3.0	0	1.7	0	7
Titanic	11.6	0	29.2	2	22.4	2	0.0	0	6.8	0	0.0	0	11.9	1	10.8	1	7.1	0	6
Total	28.2	18	21.5	15	15.7	10	9.1	6	6.0	4	5.2	3	6.2	2	3.1	2	5.1	0	60

Incumbent candidates are indicated by an asterisk *

== District results ==
=== Balmoral ===
2014: 1 x DUP, 1 x SDLP, 1 x Alliance, 1 x Sinn Féin, 1 x UUP
2019: 2 x DUP, 1 x SDLP, 1 x Alliance, 1 x Sinn Féin
2014-2019 Change: DUP gain from UUP

Balmoral - 5 seats
Party	Candidate	FPv%	Count					
Party	Candidate	FPv%	1	2	3	4	5	6
Alliance	Kate Nicholl* †	20.00%	1,842					
DUP	David Graham †	15.62%	1,442	1,447.44	1,494.44	1,705.44		
SDLP	Dónal Lyons*	14.18%	1,306	1,374.51	1,396.55	1,461.75	1,469.94	1,608.94
DUP	Sarah Bunting	11.12%	1,025	1,029.08	1,056.25	1,285.35	1,432.77	1,478.69
Sinn Féin	Geraldine McAteer*	13.93%	1,283	1,291.16	1,311.16	1,313.33	1,313.33	1,421.98
SDLP	Michael Mulhern	8.82%	813	863.15	896.55	930.31	934.86	1,233.18
Green (NI)	Caoimhe O'Connell	5.47%	504	616.37	752.02	862.6	870.79	
UUP	Jeffrey Dudgeon*	7.16%	660	696.71	745.74			
People Before Profit	Pádraigín Mervyn	2.19%	202	215.94				
UKIP	William Traynor	1.44%	133	134.53				
Electorate: 17,864 Valid: 9,210 (51.56%) Spoilt: 116 Quota: 1,536 Turnout: 9,326 (52.21%)

=== Black Mountain ===
2014: 5 x Sinn Féin, 1 x People Before Profit, 1 x SDLP
2019: 6 x Sinn Féin, 1 x People Before Profit
2014-2019 Change: Sinn Féin gain from SDLP

Black Mountain - 7 seats
Party	Candidate	FPv%	Count					
Party	Candidate	FPv%	1	2	3	4	5	6
People Before Profit	Matt Collins*	16.14%	2,268					
Sinn Féin	Ciarán Beattie*	13.47%	1,893					
Sinn Féin	Steven Corr* †	13.26%	1,864					
Sinn Féin	Arder Carson*	11.63%	1,634	1,686.78	1,710.65	1,715.95	1,773.95	
Sinn Féin	Micheal Donnelly	10.92%	1,535	1,569.32	1,572.82	1,583.57	1,623.65	1,667.66
Sinn Féin	Ronan McLaughlin	9.36%	1,316	1,354.22	1,444.87	1,510.07	1,567.35	1,614.95
Sinn Féin	Emma Groves* †	10.18%	1,431	1,465.32	1,470.43	1,473.98	1,520.58	1,590.64
SDLP	Paul Doherty	5.57%	783	903.9	906.35	908.05	1,175.18	1,432.89
Aontú	Eoin Geraghty	5.34%	750	796.02	797	797.9	861.98	
Green (NI)	Stevie Maginn	1.45%	204	282	283.05	283.8		
Alliance	Liam Norris	1.52%	213	256.16	256.93	257.43		
Workers' Party	Conor Campbell	1.15%	162	210.88	213.05	214.45		
Electorate: 26,022 Valid: 14,053 (54.00%) Spoilt: 345 Quota: 1,757 Turnout: 14,398 (55.33%)

=== Botanic ===
2014: 1 x DUP, 1 x Alliance, 1 x Sinn Féin, 1 x SDLP, 1 x UUP
2019: 1 x DUP, 1 x Alliance, 1 x Sinn Féin, 1 x SDLP, 1 x Green
2014-2019 Change: Green gain from UUP

Botanic - 5 seats
Party	Candidate	FPv%	Count										
Party	Candidate	FPv%	1	2	3	4	5	6	7	8	9	10	11
Green (NI)	Áine Groogan	14.39%	1,401	1,419	1,423	1,436	1,447	1,632					
DUP	Tracy Kelly	14.02%	1,365	1,389	1,498	1,498	1,579	1,582	1,665				
Sinn Féin	Deirdre Hargey* †	13.61%	1,325	1,332	1,332	1,510	1,512	1,556	1,558	1,639			
Alliance	Emmet McDonough-Brown*	11.74%	1,143	1,155	1,158	1,167	1,170	1,232	1,301	1,432	1,433.77	1,437.68	2,118.68
SDLP	Gary McKeown	10.36%	1,009	1,020	1,021	1,039	1,042	1,091	1,119	1,363	1,363	1,372.2	1,500.12
DUP	Graham Craig*	6.32%	615	633	653	653	700	702	829	878	916.35	916.58	931.17
Alliance	Micky Murray	7.74%	754	755	758	762	765	786	824	902	902.59	903.97	
Independent	Declan Boyle*	6.25%	609	612	613	616	623	634	663				
UUP	Richard Kennedy	3.42%	333	341	363	363	437	445					
People Before Profit	Paul Loughran	3.93%	383	415	418	420	422						
South Belfast Unionists	Billy Dickson	2.39%	233	247	256	256							
Sinn Féin	Caitríona Mallaghan	2.35%	229	229	229								
PUP	Ian Shanks	1.75%	170	178									
Workers' Party	Paddy Lynn	0.89%	87										
TUV	John Hiddleston	0.84%	82										
Electorate: 21,987 Valid: 9,738 (44.29%) Spoilt: 104 Quota: 1,624 Turnout: 9,842 (44.76%)

=== Castle ===
2014: 2 x DUP, 1 x Sinn Féin, 1 x Alliance, 1 x SDLP, 1 x UUP
2019: 2 x DUP, 1 x Sinn Féin, 1 x Alliance, 1 x SDLP, 1 x Green
2014-2019 Change: Green gain from UUP

Castle - 6 seats
Party	Candidate	FPv%	Count								
Party	Candidate	FPv%	1	2	3	4	5	6	7	8	9
Alliance	Nuala McAllister* †	15.81%	1,787								
Sinn Féin	John Finucane †	14.60%	1,650								
DUP	Fred Cobain	12.73%	1,439	1,440.35	1,440.35	1,443.34	1,446.44	1,458.44	1,460.53	1,939.53	
DUP	Guy Spence* †	12.45%	1,407	1,408.08	1,408.08	1,412.17	1,418.26	1,425.26	1,426.35	1,783.35	
Green (NI)	Mal O'Hara	7.80%	882	939.51	967.67	1,031.82	1,174.86	1,277.64	1,350.6	1,423.01	1,493.01
SDLP	Carl Whyte	5.76%	651	680.61	690.51	709.32	727.04	835.2	1,365.4	1,397.65	1,432.65
Sinn Féin	Mary Ellen Campbell*	9.76%	1,103	1,109.66	1,111.93	1,128.29	1,145.56	1,183.92	1,212.91	1,200	1,223
UUP	David Browne*	8.97%	1,014	1,022.46	1,024.64	1,027	1,033.27	1,042.72	1,049.35		
SDLP	Heather Wilson	4.87%	551	572.78	586.23	604.31	614.58	686.57			
Independent	Patrick Convery*	3.33%	377	384.47	398.19	406.46	426.18				
People Before Profit	Riley Johnston	1.80%	204	211.83	215.83	245.46					
Workers' Party	Gemma Weir	1.38%	159	166.92	171.32						
Independent	Cathal Mullaghan	0.67%	76	81.49							
Electorate: 22,262 Valid: 11,300 (50.76%) Spoilt: 136 Quota: 1,615 Turnout: 11,436 (51.37%)

=== Collin ===
2014: 5 x Sinn Féin, 1 x SDLP
2019: 4 x Sinn Féin, 1 x SDLP, 1 x People Before Profit
2014-2019 Change: People Before Profit gain from Sinn Féin

Collin - 6 seats
Party	Candidate	FPv%	Count						
Party	Candidate	FPv%	1	2	3	4	5	6	7
Sinn Féin	Danny Baker* †	18.15%	2,196						
People Before Profit	Michael Collins	12.93%	1,565	1,601.54	1,667.96	1,738.96			
Sinn Féin	Séanna Walsh*	11.58%	1,402	1,666.81	1,672.81	1,684.44	1,684.44	1,700.07	1,762.07
Sinn Féin	Stephen Magennis* †	13.35%	1,616	1,646.66	1,653.5	1,658.5	1,659.5	1,673.92	1,708.76
SDLP	Brian Heading*	8.02%	970	980.92	1,002.97	1,044.39	1,094.39	1,430.39	1,682.23
Sinn Féin	Matt Garrett*	10.44%	1,264	1,342.75	1,351.17	1,360.8	1,362.8	1,391.64	1,465.53
Sinn Féin	Charlene O'Hara*	9.81%	1,187	1,205.48	1,210.48	1,213.9	1,213.9	1,226.53	1,268.56
Aontú	Nichola McClean	5.54%	670	675.67	681.67	691.67	702.67	743.67	
Alliance	Donnamarie Higgins	3.66%	443	445.31	460.31	538.94	637.94		
DUP	David McKee	2.55%	309	309	389	393			
Green (NI)	Ellen Murray	1.99%	241	244.15	255.15				
UUP	Fred Rodgers	1.07%	130	130					
Workers' Party	Paddy Crossan	0.90%	109	111.73					
Electorate: 23,300 Valid: 12,102 (51.94%) Spoilt: 221 Quota: 1,729 Turnout: 12,323 (52.89%)

=== Court ===
2014: 2 x DUP, 2 x Sinn Féin, 1 x PUP, 1 x TUV
2019: 3 x DUP, 2 x Sinn Féin, 1 x PUP
2014-2019 Change: DUP gain from TUV

Court - 6 seats
Party	Candidate	FPv%	Count										
Party	Candidate	FPv%	1	2	3	4	5	6	7	8	9	10	11
DUP	Frank McCoubrey*	19.70%	2,227										
DUP	Brian Kingston* †	14.60%	1,648										
DUP	Nicola Verner	9.90%	1,119	1,533.18	1,548.13	1,549.41	1,549.41	1,652.41					
PUP	Billy Hutchinson*	8.20%	929	1,016.48	1,018.08	1,023.35	1,024.35	1,077.13	1,077.55	1,090.55	1,096.55	1,264.73	1,622.32
Sinn Féin	Claire Canavan*	12.80%	1,447	1,447	1,447	1,455	1,466	1,467	1,467	1,489	1,565	1,468	1,569
Sinn Féin	Tina Black*	12.30%	1,396	1,396.27	1,396.28	1,405.29	1,458.29	1,458.29	1,458.29	1,473.29	1,549.29	1,552.56	1,560.56
People Before Profit	Cailín McCaffery	6.10%	686	686.27	686.33	724.33	765.6	767.6	781.88	864.88	968.89	985.43	1,010.75
UUP	Dave Anderson	3.40%	385	411.19	411.89	418.9	420.9	481.45	498.67	529.22	534.22	668.93	
Independent	Jolene Bunting*	3.10%	351	380.43	380.84	383.84	383.84	423.3	427.5	438.5	450.5		
SDLP	Tiernan Fitzlarkin	2.60%	298	298.54	298.54	306.54	320.55	320.55	320.55	359.83			
Alliance	Ciara Campbell	2.20%	253	254.35	254.88	296.38	302.38	305.65	305.65				
TUV	Eric Smyth	2.30%	259	287.43	287.97	287.98	287.98						
Workers' Party	Joanne Lowry	1.50%	166	166	166.02	180.29							
Green (NI)	Sinéad Magner	1.30%	147	148.08	148.13								
Electorate: 22,116 Valid: 11,310 (51.14%) Spoilt: 218 Quota: 1,616 Turnout: 11,528 (52.13%)

=== Lisnasharragh ===
2014: 2 x Alliance, 2 x DUP, 1 x SDLP, 1 x UUP
2019: 2 x Alliance, 2 x DUP, 1 x SDLP, 1 x Green
2014-2019 Change: Green gain from UUP

Lisnasharragh - 6 seats
Party	Candidate	FPv%	Count									
Party	Candidate	FPv%	1	2	3	4	5	6	7	8	9	10
Alliance	Michael Long*	15.86%	1,755									
Alliance	Eric Hanvey	12.91%	1,429	1,556.98	1,582.98							
Green (NI)	Brian Smyth	11.14%	1,233	1,243.35	1,291.98	1,304.98	1,423.25	1,484.24	1,501.42	1,521.51	1,679.51	
DUP	David Brooks †	13.37%	1,479	1,479.72	1,481.72	1,503.81	1,507.81	1,510.9	1,563.9	1,577.9	1,578.9	1,774.9
DUP	Tommy Sandford*	8.59%	951	951.9	954.9	985.9	989.9	991.9	1,104.99	1,118.99	1,123.99	1,588.99
SDLP	Séamas De Faoite	8.93%	988	993.76	1,005.12	1,005.12	1,017.21	1,098.02	1,100.11	1,100.29	1,521.27	1,523.45
UUP	Chris McGimpsey*	4.59%	508	509.98	510.07	528.25	539.25	545.34	591.34	1,017.33	1,018.42	1,089.69
DUP	Aileen Graham*	5.96%	660	660.63	663.63	684.63	687.72	694.72	753.81	772.99	775.17	
Sinn Féin	Stevie Jenkins	5.59%	619	621.52	625.52	626.52	636.52	647.7	647.79	647.79		
UUP	Ben Manton	3.75%	415	416.44	419.44	434.44	440.44	451.44	520.44			
PUP	Gwen Ferguson	3.28%	363	363.63	364.72	387.72	393.72	395.72				
Independent	Kate Mullan*	1.84%	204	206.16	207.25	209.34	219.43					
Labour Alternative	Amy Ferguson	1.45%	160	160.27	191.54	195.54						
UKIP	Catherine McComb	1.52%	169	169.45	169.45							
People Before Profit	Ivanka Antova	1.20%	133	134.71								
Electorate: 20,783 Valid: 11,066 (53.25%) Spoilt: 116 Quota: 1,581 Turnout: 11,182 (53.80%)

=== Oldpark ===
2014: 3 x Sinn Féin, 1 x SDLP, 1 x DUP, 1 x PUP
2019: 3 x Sinn Féin, 1 x SDLP, 1 x DUP, 1 x People Before Profit
2014-2019 Change: People Before Profit gain from PUP

Oldpark - 6 seats
Party	Candidate	FPv%	Count									
Party	Candidate	FPv%	1	2	3	4	5	6	7	8	9	10
SDLP	Paul McCusker* ‡	25.21%	2,856									
DUP	Dale Pankhurst* †	15.01%	1,701									
Sinn Féin	Ryan Murphy*	10.46%	1,185	1,326.6	1,333	1,333.04	1,333.04	1,341.44	1,341.44	1,362.2	1,835.2	
Sinn Féin	Shauneen Baker †	9.77%	1,107	1,264.44	1,278.48	1,278.76	1,279.24	1,298.12	1,302.12	1,374.24	1,680.72	
Sinn Féin	J. J. Magee*	10.01%	1,134	1,244.4	1,250.28	1,250.28	1,251.32	1,261.68	1,264.68	1,285.96	1,404.84	1,616.03
People Before Profit	Fiona Ferguson	3.94%	447	781.08	829.88	829.96	835.44	951.16	995.24	1,336.6	1,401.76	1,404.7
DUP	Gillian Simpson	5.05%	573	577.8	577.8	631.88	735.96	738.48	1,198.16	1,240.72	1,240.72	1,240.72
Sinn Féin	Mary Clarke*	7.02%	796	1,009.6	1,015.48	1,015.48	1,015.96	1,029.76	1,032.76	1,058.36		
Alliance	Jack Armstrong	3.44%	390	535.92	554.04	554.08	576.16	691.32	756.88			
PUP	Julie-Anne Corr-Johnston*	5.07%	575	582.2	584.68	595.68	677.28	689.32				
Green (NI)	Lesley Veronica	2.03%	231	296.76	320.6	320.8	331.28					
UUP	Jason Docherty	2.11%	239	242.84	242.84	244.84						
Workers' Party	Chris Bailie	0.82%	93	141								
Electorate: 22,024 Valid: 11,327 (51.43%) Spoilt: 218 Quota: 1,619 Turnout: 11,545 (52.42%)

=== Ormiston ===
2014: 2 x Alliance, 2 x DUP, 2 x UUP, 1 x Green
2019: 3 x Alliance, 2 x DUP, 1 x UUP, 1 x Green
2014-2019 Change: Alliance gain from UUP

Ormiston - 7 seats
Party	Candidate	FPv%	Count						
Party	Candidate	FPv%	1	2	3	4	5	6	7
Alliance	Ross McMullan	19.74%	2,622						
Alliance	Peter McReynolds* †	13.28%	1,764						
Alliance	Sian O'Neill* †	8.77%	1,165	1,948					
Green (NI)	Anthony Flynn	9.79%	1,301	1,380.56	1,579.12	1,663.24			
DUP	Tom Haire*	11.00%	1,462	1,465.6	1,470.08	1,507.8	1,629.64	1,633.96	2,183.96
UUP	Jim Rodgers* ‡‡	10.66%	1,416	1,444.8	1,478.24	1,521.68	1,608.8	1,649.84	1,697.84
DUP	John Hussey*	9.55%	1,269	1,274.04	1,276.76	1,304.76	1,343.12	1,348.24	1,618.48
UUP	Peter Johnston*	5.70%	757	776.8	797.76	823	939.92	988.56	1,007.2
DUP	Gareth Spratt	6.45%	857	859.88	862.44	877.44	897.6	900.48	
PUP	William Ennis	2.97%	394	398.68	406.52	433.88			
UKIP	Keith Lonsdale	1.66%	221	221	222.44				
Sinn Féin	Laura Misteil	0.43%	57	70.32	77.3				
Electorate: 25,617 Valid: 13,285 (51.86%) Spoilt: 147 Quota: 1,661 Turnout: 13,432 (52.43%)

=== Titanic ===
2014: 2 x DUP, 1 x Alliance, 1 x UUP, 1 x PUP, 1 x Sinn Féin
2019: 2 x DUP, 2 x Alliance, 1 x UUP, 1 x PUP
2014-2019 Change: Alliance gain from Sinn Féin

Titanic - 6 seats
Party	Candidate	FPv%	Count							
Party	Candidate	FPv%	1	2	3	4	5	6	7	8
DUP	George Dorrian*	13.41%	1,270	1,317	1,328	1,432				
DUP	Adam Newton*	9.64%	913	928	932	961	997.9	1,520.9		
Alliance	Michelle Kelly	11.28%	1,068	1,072	1,079	1,094	1,094	1,100	1,353	
UUP	Sonia Copeland*	9.00%	852	890	1,096	1,230	1,247.22	1,277.68	1,307.68	1,410.28
PUP	John Kyle* ‡	10.85%	1,027	1,079	1,104	1,209	1,216.38	1,257.3	1,309.3	1,368.7
Alliance	Carole Howard ‡	11.14%	1,055	1,061	1,075	1,096	1,096.82	1,099.64	1,314.64	1,318.24
Sinn Féin	Mairead O’Donnell*	11.64%	1,102	1,103	1,103	1,103	1,103	1,103	1,145	1,145
Green (NI)	Ben Smylie	6.77%	641	652	656	680	680.82	680.82		
DUP	Lee Reynolds	6.19%	586	597	602	610	625.58			
Independent	Karl Bennett	4.73%	448	468	473					
UUP	Colin Hall-Thompson	2.94%	278	286						
UKIP	Paul Girvan	2.41%	228							
Electorate: 22,653 Valid: 9,468 (41.80%) Spoilt: 184 Quota: 1,353 Turnout: 9,652 (42.61%)

== Changes during the term ==
=== † Co-options ===
Date co-opted	Electoral Area	Party	Outgoing	Co-optee	Reason
6 January 2020	Castle	Sinn Féin	John Finucane	Conor Maskey	Finucane was elected to the House of Commons.
14 January 2020	Botanic	Sinn Féin	Deirdre Hargey	John Gormley	Hargey was co-opted to the Northern Ireland Assembly.
7 April 2020	Castle	DUP	Guy Spence	Dean McCullough	Spence resigned.
4 May 2020	Balmoral	DUP	David Graham	Gareth Spratt	Graham resigned.
1 September 2020	Oldpark	Sinn Féin	Shauneen Baker	Nichola Bradley	Baker resigned.
17 November 2020	Black Mountain	Sinn Féin	Emma Groves	Áine McCabe	Groves resigned.
16 February 2022	Collin	Sinn Féin	Stephen Magennis	Caoimhín McCann	Magennis resigned.
26 May 2022	Ormiston	Alliance	Peter McReynolds	Jenna Maghie	McReynolds was elected to the Northern Ireland Assembly.
26 May 2022	Ormiston	Alliance	Sian Mulholland (Formerly O'Neill)	Christine Bower	Mulholland was co-opted to the Killultagh DEA on Lisburn and Castlereagh City Council, replacing David Honeyford upon his election to the Northern Ireland Assembly.
27 May 2022	Balmoral	Alliance	Kate Nicholl	Micky Murray	Nicholl was elected to the Northern Ireland Assembly.
30 May 2022	Castle	Alliance	Nuala McAllister	Sam Nelson	McAllister was elected to the Northern Ireland Assembly.
30 May 2022	Collin	Sinn Féin	Danny Baker	Joseph Duffy	Baker was elected to the Northern Ireland Assembly.
7 June 2022	Court	DUP	Brian Kingston	Naomi Thompson	Kingston was elected to the Northern Ireland Assembly.
7 June 2022	Lisnasharragh	DUP	David Brooks	Sammy Douglas	Brooks was elected to the Northern Ireland Assembly.
29 November 2022	Black Mountain	Sinn Féin	Steven Corr	Róis-Máire Donnelly	Corr resigned.
6 January 2023	Oldpark	DUP	Dale Pankhurst	Jordan Doran	Pankhurst resigned.

=== ‡ Changes in affiliation ===
Date	Electoral Area	Name	Previous affiliation	New affiliation	Circumstance
6 May 2019	Ormiston	Jim Rodgers	UUP	Independent	UUP whip withdrawn following a controversial election leaflet about Alliance.
20 May 2021	Ormiston	Jim Rodgers	Independent	UUP	UUP whip restored by outgoing UUP leader Steve Aiken.
12 December 2021	Titanic	Carole Howard	Alliance	UUP	Defected from Alliance to UUP to more openly express her pro-Union views.
16 December 2021	Titanic	John Kyle	PUP	Independent	Left the PUP over disagreements relating to the NI Protocol.
10 February 2022	Titanic	John Kyle	Independent	UUP	Joined the UUP having previously left the PUP.
30 March 2023	Oldpark	Paul McCusker	SDLP	Independent	Left the SDLP after feeling "frustrated and disheartened" with local politics and believing he was best placed to run in the upcoming council election as an independent.

=== Suspensions ===
None

Last update 30 March 2023.

Current composition: see Belfast City Council.
