= Ormiston (District Electoral Area) =

District Electoral Area (DEA) in Belfast, Northern Ireland

- Belfast City Council DEA constituency
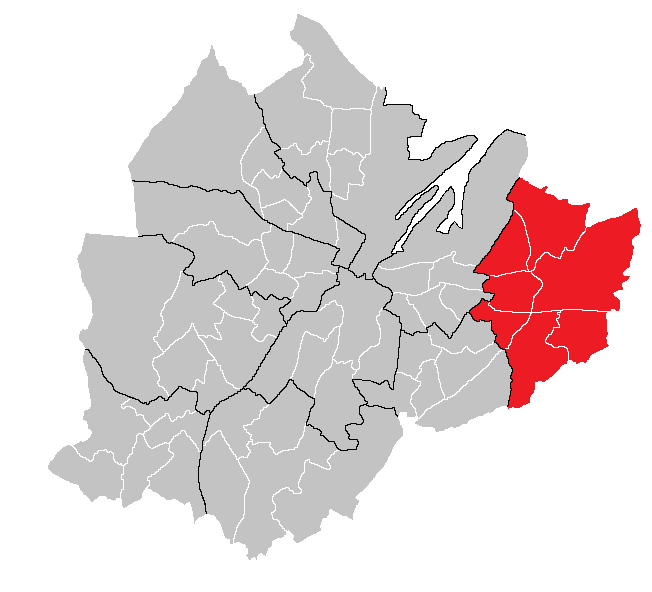
- Ormiston DEA marked on a map of Belfast City Council and its wards

Current constituency
- Created: 2014
- Seats: 7 (2014–)
- Councillors: Hedley Abernethy (APNI); Christine Bower (APNI); Anthony Flynn (GPNI); James Lawlor (DUP); Jenna Maghie (APNI); Andrew McCormick (DUP); Jim Rodgers (UUP)

Ormiston has been one of the ten district electoral areas (DEA) in Belfast, Northern Ireland since 2014. Located in the east of the city, the district elects seven members to Belfast City Council and contains the wards of Belmont, Garnerville, Gilnahirk, Sandown, Shandon, Knock and Stormont. Ormiston, along with wards from the neighbouring Titanic and Lisnasharragh DEAs, together with parts of Lisburn and Castlereagh District Council, form the Belfast East constituency for the Northern Ireland Assembly and UK Parliament.

The district was created for the 2014 local elections, replacing the Victoria DEA, which had existed since 1985. Nineteen candidates contested the first election in 2014, the most of any DEA in Northern Ireland.

== Councillors ==
Election	Councillor (Party)	Councillor (Party)	Councillor (Party)	Councillor (Party)	Councillor (Party)	Councillor (Party)	Councillor (Party)
May 2024 Co-Option	Anthony Flynn (Green Party)	Christine Bower (Alliance)	Jenna Maghie (Alliance)	Hedley Abernethy (Alliance)	Jim Rodgers (UUP)/ (Independent)	James Lawlor (DUP)	Andrew McCormick (DUP)
2023	Anthony Flynn (Green Party)	Christine Bower (Alliance)	Jenna Maghie (Alliance)	Ross McMullan (Alliance)	Jim Rodgers (UUP)/ (Independent)	James Lawlor (DUP)	Andrew McCormick (DUP)
May 2022 Co-Options	Anthony Flynn (Green Party)	Christine Bower (Alliance)	Jenna Maghie (Alliance)	Ross McMullan (Alliance)	Jim Rodgers (UUP)/ (Independent)	John Hussey (DUP)	Tom Haire (DUP)
May 2021 Defection	Anthony Flynn (Green Party)	Peter McReynolds (Alliance)	Sian O'Neill (Alliance)	Ross McMullan (Alliance)	Jim Rodgers (UUP)/ (Independent)	John Hussey (DUP)	Tom Haire (DUP)
May 2019 Defection	Anthony Flynn (Green Party)	Peter McReynolds (Alliance)	Sian O'Neill (Alliance)	Ross McMullan (Alliance)	Jim Rodgers (UUP)/ (Independent)	John Hussey (DUP)	Tom Haire (DUP)
2019	Anthony Flynn (Green Party)	Peter McReynolds (Alliance)	Sian O'Neill (Alliance)	Ross McMullan (Alliance)	Jim Rodgers (UUP)/ (Independent)	John Hussey (DUP)	Tom Haire (DUP)
June 2017 Co-Option	Georgina Milne (Green Party)	Peter McReynolds (Alliance)	Sian O'Neill (Alliance)	Peter Johnston (UUP)	Jim Rodgers (UUP)/ (Independent)	John Hussey (DUP)	Tom Haire (DUP)
June 2016 Co-Option	Georgina Milne (Green Party)	Mervyn Jones (Alliance)	Sian O'Neill (Alliance)	Peter Johnston (UUP)	Jim Rodgers (UUP)/ (Independent)	John Hussey (DUP)	Tom Haire (DUP)
September 2015 Co-Option	Ross Brown (Green Party)	Mervyn Jones (Alliance)	Sian O'Neill (Alliance)	Peter Johnston (UUP)	Jim Rodgers (UUP)/ (Independent)	John Hussey (DUP)	Tom Haire (DUP)
2014	Ross Brown (Green Party)	Mervyn Jones (Alliance)	Laura McNamee (Alliance)	Peter Johnston (UUP)	Jim Rodgers (UUP)/ (Independent)	John Hussey (DUP)	Tom Haire (DUP)

== 2023 Elections ==
2019: 3 x Alliance, 2 x DUP, 1 x UUP, 1 x Green

2023: 3 x Alliance, 2 x DUP, 1 x UUP, 1 x Green

2019–2023 Change: No change

Ormiston - 7 seats
Party	Candidate	FPv%	Count							
Party	Candidate	FPv%	1	2	3	4	5	6	7	8
Alliance	Christine Bower*	18.61%	2,661							
DUP	James Lawlor	16.75%	2,397							
DUP	Andrew McCormick	11.49%	1,642	1,648.72	2,180.22					
Alliance	Jenna Maghie*	9.09%	1,299	1,681.72	1,684.47	1,688.27	1,797.27			
Alliance	Ross McMullan* †	10.35%	1,480	1,585.28	1,587.03	1,593.63	1,666.83	1,684.59	2,542.59	
Green (NI)	Anthony Flynn*	6.99%	999	1,042.20	1,044.45	1,053.45	1,200.94	1,226.89	1,438.69	1,919.69
UUP	Jim Rodgers*	7.02%	1,004	1,010.40	1,024.40	1,157.00	1,162.00	1,532.42	1,557.42	1,644.42
UUP	Carole Howard*	5.93%	847	863.96	881.71	965.51	978.08	1,282.15	1,303.51	1,365.51
Alliance	Caitlin Sullivan	6.22%	889	1,145.64	1,145.64	1,147.04	1,196.92	1,199.32		
TUV	John Hiddleston	4.76%	680	684.16	710.91	863.91	870.93			
Sinn Féin	Caitríona Mallaghan	1.22%	174	181.04	181.29	181.69				
People Before Profit	Fiona Doran	0.82%	117	132.36	133.11	133.71				
SDLP	Lorcan McGuirk	0.74%	106	111.12	111.12	111.72				
Electorate: 26,314 Valid: 14,295 (54.32%) Spoilt: 84 Quota: 1,787 Turnout: 14,379 (54.64%)

== 2019 Elections ==
2014: 2 x Alliance, 2 x DUP, 2 x UUP, 1 x Green

2019: 3 x Alliance, 2 x DUP, 1 x UUP, 1 x Green

2014-2019 Change: Alliance gain from UUP

Ormiston - 7 seats
Party	Candidate	FPv%	Count						
Party	Candidate	FPv%	1	2	3	4	5	6	7
Alliance	Ross McMullan	19.74%	2,622						
Alliance	Peter McReynolds* †	13.28%	1,764						
Alliance	Sian O'Neill* †	8.77%	1,165	1,948					
Green (NI)	Anthony Flynn	9.79%	1,301	1,380.56	1,579.12	1,663.24			
DUP	Tom Haire*	11.00%	1,462	1,465.6	1,470.08	1,507.8	1,629.64	1,633.96	2,183.96
UUP	Jim Rodgers* ‡‡	10.66%	1,416	1,444.8	1,478.24	1,521.68	1,608.8	1,649.84	1,697.84
DUP	John Hussey*	9.55%	1,269	1,274.04	1,276.76	1,304.76	1,343.12	1,348.24	1,618.48
UUP	Peter Johnston*	5.70%	757	776.8	797.76	823	939.92	988.56	1,007.2
DUP	Gareth Spratt	6.45%	857	859.88	862.44	877.44	897.6	900.48	
PUP	William Ennis	2.97%	394	398.68	406.52	433.88			
UKIP	Keith Lonsdale	1.66%	221	221	222.44				
Sinn Féin	Laura Misteil	0.43%	57	70.32	77.3				
Electorate: 25,617 Valid: 13,285 (51.86%) Spoilt: 147 Quota: 1,661 Turnout: 13,432 (52.43%)

== 2014 Elections ==
Ormiston - 7 seats
Party	Candidate	FPv%	Count												
Party	Candidate	FPv%	1	2	3	4	5	6	7	8	9	10	11	12	13
UUP	Jim Rodgers*	14.53%	1,899												
Alliance	Mervyn Jones* †	9.06%	1,184	1,188.48	1,222.48	1,231.76	1,298.76	1,356.46	1,367.46	1,378.6	1,412.6	1,418.6	1,898.74		
Alliance	Laura McNamee* †	6.87%	898	902.2	923.2	929.34	980.34	1,405.6	1,407.6	1,414.6	1,425.6	1,438.7	1,781.74		
UUP	Peter Johnston	4.76%	622	768.58	769.72	812.54	877.22	887.06	1,035.16	1,081.22	1,231.18	1,478.5	1,501.18	1,607.8	1,639.76
DUP	Tom Haire*	8.20%	1,072	1,083.62	1,083.62	1,088.76	1,101.9	1,101.9	1,173.6	1,297.28	1,467.26	1,568.8	1,581.8	1,583.99	1,585.35
DUP	John Hussey*	6.28%	821	830.94	830.94	837.36	849.36	849.36	917.34	1,346.96	1,424.5	1,544	1,555.04	1,560.15	1,568.31
Green (NI)	Ross Brown †	6.36%	831	836.18	853.18	872.32	970.02	996.3	1,015.3	1,038.58	1,108.14	1,158.7	1,270.26	1,408.96	1,506.88
DUP	Denny Vitty*	6.19%	809	834.9	836.9	847.46	860.46	864.46	907.88	1,020.56	1,078.84	1,304.48	1,318.04	1,328.99	1,334.43
Alliance	Ross McMullan	6.88%	899	902.5	949.5	950.78	987.78	1,063.48	1,066.48	1,077.9	1,090.9	1,102.04			
PUP	Ian Shanks	5.51%	720	728.96	729.96	737.24	745.38	746.52	824.66	835.36	938.2				
UKIP	Stephen Crosby	4.73%	618	623.04	624.04	639.04	660.18	664.18	820.44	834					
DUP	Brian Kennedy*	5.74%	750	763.72	765.72	773.56	780.7	783.98	811.68						
TUV	John Hiddleston	4.90%	640	647	648	654	657.14	658.14							
Alliance	Andrew Webb*	4.29%	561	565.76	572.76	581.9	611.9								
NI21	Ian Dickson	1.87%	245	246.82	248.82	255.82									
NI21	Jayne Olorunda	1.47%	192	193.4	195.4	203.54									
NI Conservatives	Ian Reid	1.24%	162	167.74	168.74										
SDLP	Michael McMillan	0.73%	95	95											
Sinn Féin	Laura Keenan	0.43%	56	56.14											
Electorate: 20,881 Valid: 13,074 (62.61%) Spoilt: 118 Quota: 1,635 Turnout: 13,192 (63.18%)
