= 2005 Castlereagh Borough Council election =

Local government election in Northern Ireland

← 2001	5 May 2005	2011 →

All 23 seats to Castlereagh Borough Council 12 seats needed for a majority
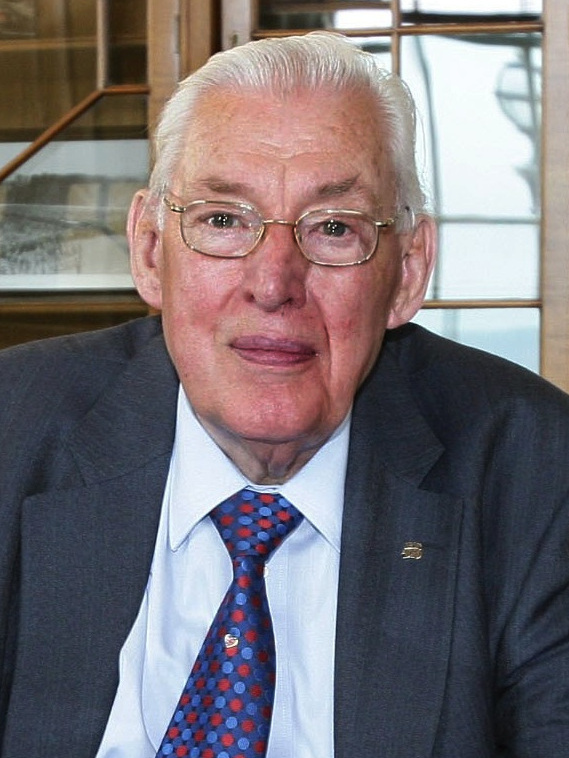

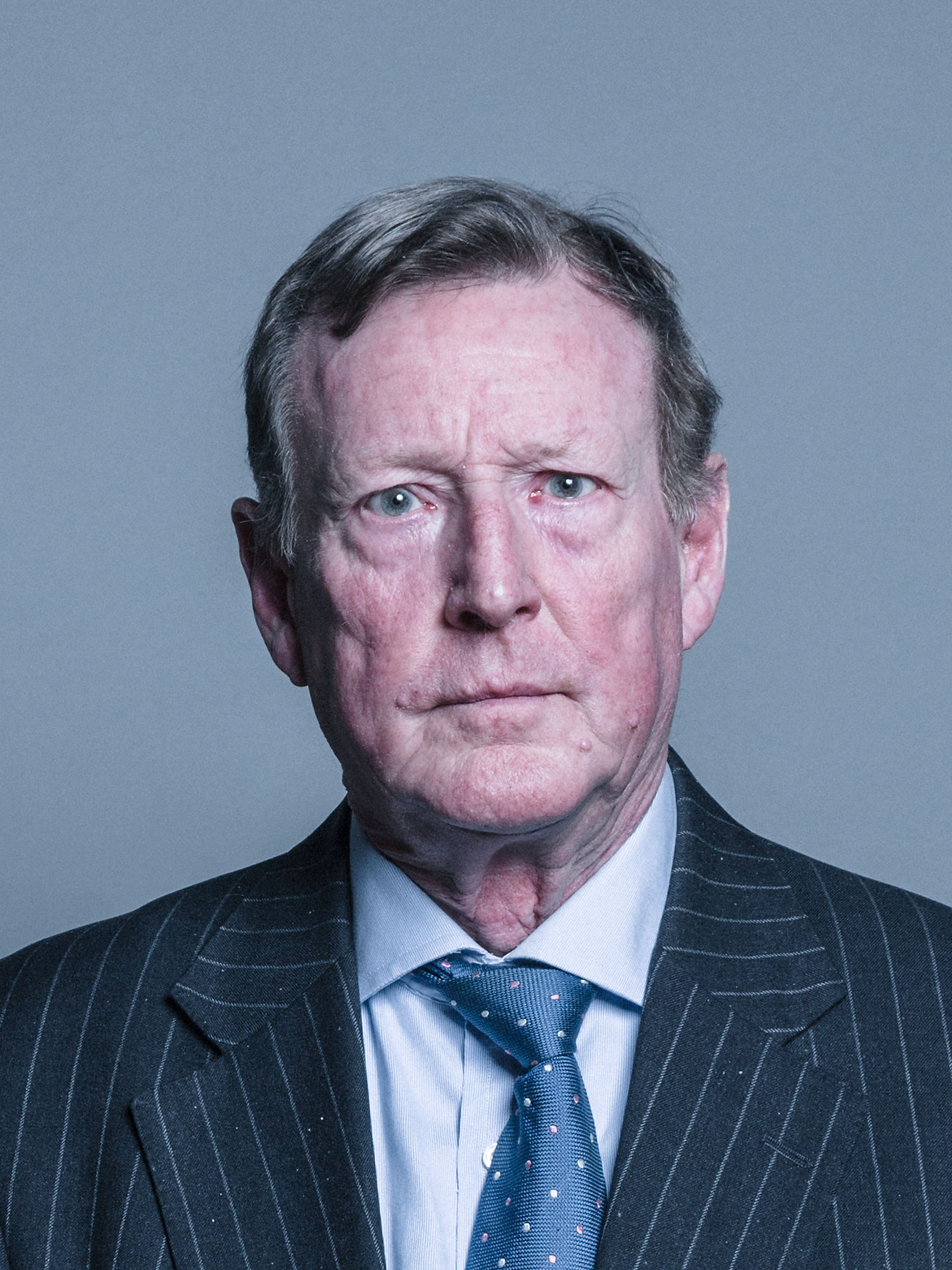

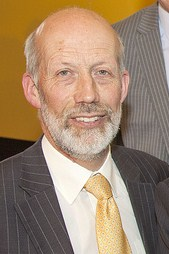

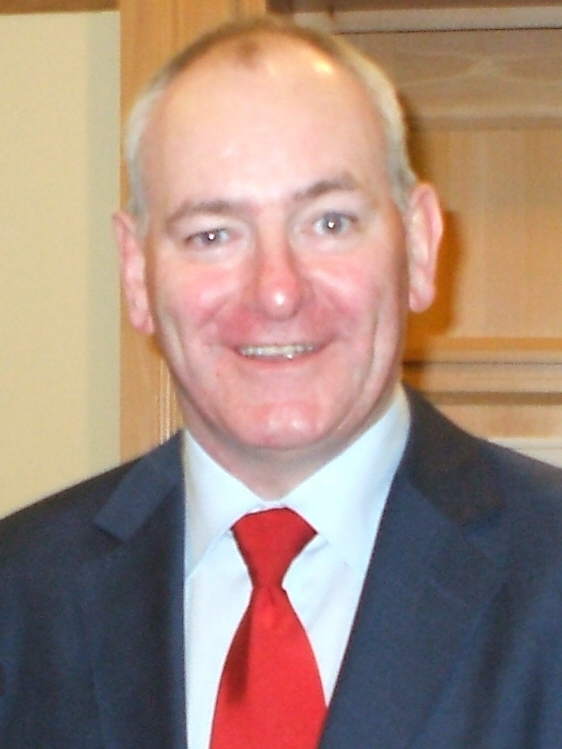
	First party	Second party	Third party
Leader	Ian Paisley	David Trimble	David Ford
Party	DUP	UUP	Alliance
Seats won	13	4	4
Seat change	▲3	▼1	Steady
Percentage	46.5%	17.8%	16.2%
Swing	▲7.1%	▼4.3%	▲1.0%
	Fourth party	Fifth party	Sixth party
Leader	Mark Durkan	Dawn Purvis
Party	SDLP	PUP	Independent
Seats won	2	0	0
Seat change	Steady	▼1	▼1
Percentage	12.0%	2.1%	3.9%
Swing	▲0.6%	▼2.1%	▲0.3%
- 2005 Castlereagh City Council Election Results, shaded by First Preference Votes.

Elections to Castlereagh Borough Council were held on 5 May 2005 on the same day as the other Northern Irish local government elections. The election used four district electoral areas to elect a total of 23 councillors.

== Election results ==
Castlereagh Borough Council Election Result 2005
Party	Seats	Gains	Losses	Net gain/loss	Seats %	Votes %	Votes	+/−
DUP	13	3	0	▲3	56.5	46.5	12,136	▲7.1
UUP	4	0	1	▼1	17.4	17.8	4,633	▼4.3
Alliance	4	0	0	Steady	17.4	16.2	4,219	▲1.0
SDLP	2	0	0	Steady	8.7	12.0	3,131	▲0.6
Independent	0	0	1	▼1	0.0	3.9	1,026	▲0.3
PUP	0	0	0	▼1	0.0	2.1	537	▼2.1
Sinn Féin	0	0	0	Steady	0.0	1.5	395	▼0.3

Note: "Votes" are the first preference votes.

== Districts summary ==
Results of the Castlereagh Borough Council election, 2005 by district
Ward	%	Cllrs	%	Cllrs	%	Cllrs	%	Cllrs	%	Cllrs	Total Cllrs
Ward	DUP		UUP		Alliance		SDLP		Others		Total Cllrs
Castlereagh Central	54.4	4	12.5	1	16.3	1	6.5	0	10.3	0	6
Castlereagh East	59.2	5	18.9	1	12.4	1	0.0	0	9.5	0	7
Castlereagh South	36.7	2	18.3	1	17.1	1	22.2	0	5.7	0	5
Castlereagh West	34.1	2	20.6	1	19.9	1	20.9	1	4.5	0	5
Total	46.5	13	17.8	4	16.2	4	12.0	2	7.5	0	23

== Districts results ==
=== Castlereagh Central ===
2001: 3 x DUP, 1 x Alliance, 1 x UUP, 1 x PUP
2005: 4 x DUP, 1 x Alliance, 1 x UUP
2001-2005 Change: DUP gain from PUP

Castlereagh Central - 6 seats
Party	Candidate	FPv%	Count						
Party	Candidate	FPv%	1	2	3	4	5	6	7
DUP	Peter Robinson*	25.81%	1,431						
Alliance	Michael Long*	16.32%	905						
DUP	Joanne Bunting*	16.14%	895						
UUP	Michael Copeland*	9.76%	541	582.86	608.21	611.62	727.3	796.3	
DUP	John Norris*	7.59%	421	663.42	669.27	699.08	710.82	790.83	800.83
DUP	Andrew Ramsey	4.91%	272	523.16	527.97	583.85	588.42	614.39	621.65
PUP	Tommy Sandford*	6.42%	356	391.88	399.03	401.34	403.99	436.39	491.01
SDLP	Sean Mullan	6.55%	363	363.92	397.72	397.94	407.8	429.9	
Independent	Alan Carson	3.77%	209	254.08	269.55	274.72	295.81		
UUP	Alan Martin	2.74%	152	165.8	181.01	181.89			
Electorate: 9,735 Valid: 5,545 (56.96%) Spoilt: 155 Quota: 793 Turnout: 5,700 (58.55%)

=== Castlereagh East ===
2001: 4 x DUP, 1 x UUP, 1 x Alliance, 1 x Independent
2005: 5 x DUP, 1 x UUP, 1 x Alliance
2001-2005 Change: DUP gain from Independent

Castlereagh East - 7 seats
Party	Candidate	FPv%	Count					
Party	Candidate	FPv%	1	2	3	4	5	6
DUP	Iris Robinson*	27.08%	2,090					
Alliance	Judith Cochrane	12.40%	957	977.9				
DUP	Gareth Robinson*	10.08%	778	1,251				
DUP	Tommy Jeffers	11.10%	857	1,033				
UUP	David Drysdale*	8.01%	618	648.25	657	844.05	847.41	951.17
DUP	Jim White*	5.40%	417	668.35	761.1	786	811.2	891.76
DUP	Charlie Tosh	5.52%	426	520.05	671.6	698.5	728.02	861.08
UUP	Mervyn Bailie	7.51%	580	597.05	602.3	719.85	722.49	805.28
Independent	Francis Gallagher*	7.14%	551	579.05	590.6	665.65	670.69	
UUP	Hazel Legge	3.41%	263	287.2	294.2			
PUP	Colin Neill	2.35%	181	190.35	195.6			
Electorate: 13,902 Valid: 7,718 (55.52%) Spoilt: 179 Quota: 965 Turnout: 7,897 (56.80%)

=== Castlereagh South ===
2001: 2 x UUP, 1 x DUP, 1 x SDLP, 1 x Alliance
2005: 2 x DUP, 1 x UUP, 1 x SDLP, 1 x Alliance
2001-2005 Change: DUP gain from UUP

Castlereagh South - 5 seats
Party	Candidate	FPv%	Count			
Party	Candidate	FPv%	1	2	3	4
DUP	James Spratt	19.06%	1,317			
DUP	John Beattie*	17.64%	1,219			
Alliance	Geraldine Rice*	17.08%	1,180			
UUP	Michael Henderson*	14.14%	977	1,082.75	1,125.71	1,385.71
SDLP	Brian Hanvey*	16.09%	1,112	1,114.85	1,116.65	1,138.43
SDLP	Leo Van Es	6.09%	421	422.8	423.1	431.31
Sinn Féin	Dermot Kennedy	5.72%	395	395.45	395.51	396.66
UUP	Barbara McBurney*	4.17%	288	333.3	346.14	
Electorate: 11,421 Valid: 6,909 (60.49%) Spoilt: 99 Quota: 1,152 Turnout: 7,008 (61.36%)

=== Castlereagh West ===
2001: 2 x DUP, 1 x Alliance, 1 x SDLP, 1 x UUP
2005: 2 x DUP, 1 x Alliance, 1 x SDLP, 1 x UUP
2001-2005 Change: No change

Castlereagh West - 5 seats
Party	Candidate	FPv%	Count					
Party	Candidate	FPv%	1	2	3	4	5	6
DUP	Ann-Marie Beattie	24.00%	1,417					
Alliance	Sara Duncan*	19.93%	1,177					
DUP	Myreve Chambers	10.09%	596	991.1				
UUP	Cecil Hall*	14.14%	835	847.6	917.3	1,039.3		
SDLP	Rosaleen Hughes*	13.45%	794	794.6	850.53	862.85	862.85	1,285.85
UUP	Bill White	6.42%	379	384.1	410.28	467.14	519.08	525.08
SDLP	Gary Vaugh	7.47%	441	441	458	467.19	468.78	
Independent	Cyril Kernaghan	4.50%	266	271.4	284.66			
Electorate: 9,805 Valid: 5,905 (60.22%) Spoilt: 145 Quota: 985 Turnout: 6,050 (61.70%)
