= David Brooks (Northern Irish politician) =

British politician, Democratic Unionist party member

David Brooks MLA
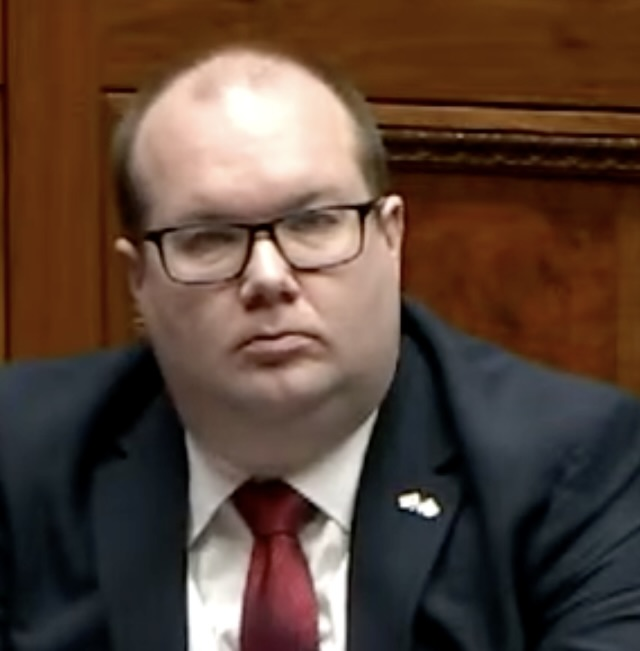
- Brooks in 2024

Member of the Northern Ireland Assembly for Belfast East
- Incumbent
- Assumed office 5 May 2022
- Preceded by: Robin Newton

Member of Belfast City Council
- In office 2 May 2019 – 5 May 2022
- Preceded by: Aileen Graham
- Succeeded by: Sammy Douglas
- Constituency: Lisnasharragh

Personal details
- Party: Democratic Unionist Party
- Spouse: Ruth Brooks

David Brooks is a Democratic Unionist Party (DUP) politician, serving as a Member of the Northern Ireland Assembly (MLA) for Belfast East since the 2022 election. Brooks was previously a Belfast City Councillor for the Lisnasharragh DEA from 2019 to 2022.

== Career ==
Brooks was first elected to Belfast City Council as a representative for the Lisnasharragh DEA at the 2019 local elections.

At the 2022 Assembly election, he was elected to the Northern Ireland Assembly as one of two DUP MLAs for Belfast East.

Brooks is the DUP's spokesperson for North–South relationships. He condemned the placing of political posters and placards on a bonfire on Eleventh Night 2022.
