= Tracy Kelly =

Lord Mayor of Belfast

Cllr Tracy Kelly

84th Lord Mayor of Belfast
- In office 2 June 2025 – 1 June 2026
- Preceded by: Micky Murray
- Succeeded by: Róis-Máire Donnelly

Member of Belfast City Council
- Incumbent
- Assumed office 2019
- Constituency: Botanic

Personal details
- Born: 1977 (age 48–49)
- Party: DUP

Tracy Kelly (born 1977) is a Northern Irish politician from the Democratic Unionist Party who has served as a member of Belfast City Council representing the Botanic constituency since 2019. Kelly served as the 84th Lord Mayor of Belfast from 2025 to 2026

== Early life ==
Kelly comes from the Donegall Road area of South Belfast. She was raised in a working-class family.

== Career ==
Kelly has a background working in community development.

== Political career ==
Tracy Kelly was elected in the 2019 Belfast City Council election. She was re-elected in 2023. Kelly was the Democratic Unionist Party candidate for Belfast South and Mid Down in the 2024 United Kingdom general election. She finished in third place.

In June 2025 she was elected Lord Mayor of Belfast. She is the first DUP woman to hold the office of Lord Mayor. After taking office the portrait of President Michael D. Higgins was removed from Belfast City Hall.
