= Chris Lyttle =

Former Northern Ireland politician (born 1981)

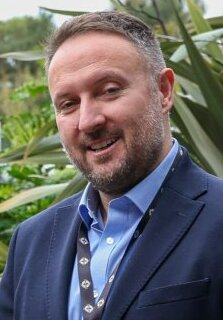

Member of the Northern Ireland Assembly for Belfast East
- In office 6 July 2010 – 28 March 2022
- Preceded by: Naomi Long
- Succeeded by: Peter McReynolds

Personal details
- Born: Belfast, Northern Ireland
- Party: Alliance
- Education: Queen's University Belfast (BA); Harvard University

Chris Lyttle is a former Alliance Party of Northern Ireland politician who was a Member of the Legislative Assembly (MLA) for Belfast East from 2010 to 2022. He succeeded Naomi Long as Alliance Party MLA for Belfast East on 5 July 2010 and was elected to serve the constituency for another term on 7 May 2011, then again in 2016 and 2017. Lyttle retired at the 2022 Assembly Election.

== Education ==
Chris Lyttle attended Queen's University Belfast, where he received a First Class Honours Degree in Politics and English. Lyttle was awarded a Helen Ramsey Turtle Scholarship for Conflict Management study at the University of California and a Frank Knox Fellowship for postgraduate training in Public Policy & Administration at Harvard University. He is also an alumnus of the Washington Ireland Program.

He is a qualified Irish Football Association UEFA B Licence and Disability Football Coach.

== Political career ==
Lyttle was chair of the Assembly Committee on Education, and deputy Chair of the Assembly Committee with responsibility for the scrutiny of the policy of the Office of the First Minister and deputy First Minister.

Lyttle chaired the All Party Group (APG) on Cycling and the APG on Children and Young People, as well as vice chaired the APG on Postal Issues. He was a member of the following APG groups: Fairtrade, International Development, Trade Unions, Small and Medium Enterprises (SMEs), Football, Heart Disease & Stroke, Science and Technology, Human Trafficking, Rugby, UNSCR 1325 Women, Peace and Security, Learning Disability, Cancer, Visual Impairment, Autism, Community and Voluntary Sector, and Ethnic Minority Communities.

On 29 October 2021, Lyttle announced that he would be stepping down at the 2022 Assembly election.

== Career after politics ==
In June 2022, Lyttle was appointed as the Head of Public Affairs at the Irish Football Association.

He is now a Client Director at Brown O'Connor Communications, Northern Ireland's leading Public Affairs and Strategic Communications agency.

Northern Ireland Assembly
Preceded by Naomi Long	MLA for Belfast East; 2010–2022	Succeeded by Peter McReynolds
