= Ryan Murphy (Irish politician) =

Sinn Féin councillor in Belfast

82nd Lord Mayor of Belfast
- In office 5 June 2023 – 3 June 2024
- Deputy: Áine Groogan
- Preceded by: Tina Black
- Succeeded by: Micky Murray

Member of Belfast City Council
- Incumbent
- Assumed office 11 January 2018
- Preceded by: Gerry McCabe
- Constituency: Oldpark

Personal details
- Born: November 1994 (age 31) Ligoniel, Belfast, Northern Ireland
- Party: Sinn Féin

Ryan Murphy (born November 1994) is an Irish Sinn Féin politician who was Lord Mayor of Belfast from June 2023 to June 2024, and a Belfast City Councillor for the Oldpark DEA since January 2018.

== Background ==
Murphy is from Ligoniel, and has lived in the area his whole life.

In January 2018, he was co-opted onto Belfast City Council to replace Gerry McCabe in the Oldpark District. Murphy retained his seat at the 2019 Council election, being elected on the fifth count. He was re-elected at the 2023 election

In June 2024, he was appointed Lord Mayor of Belfast. Murphy, who was aged 28 at the time, became one of the youngest councillors to serve in the role.
