= Ross Brown (politician) =

Politician from Northern Ireland

Leader of the Green Party on Belfast City Council
- In office 2014–2016
- Leader: Steven Agnew
- Preceded by: Office created
- Succeeded by: Georgina Milne

Member of Belfast City Council
- In office 22 May 2014 – 16 November 2016
- Preceded by: District created
- Succeeded by: Georgina Milne
- Constituency: Ormiston

Personal details
- Born: Belfast, Northern Ireland
- Party: Green Party

Ross Brown is a Northern Irish academic, economist and former Green Party politician. He was elected as a shadow councillor to Belfast City Council in the 2014 election, and also stood as the party's candidate in the European Parliament election, 2014.

He has an Economics degree from Queen's University Belfast and an American business qualification from Saint Anselm College in New Hampshire.
