= Peter McReynolds =

Alliance Party of Northern Ireland MLA

Peter McReynolds MLA
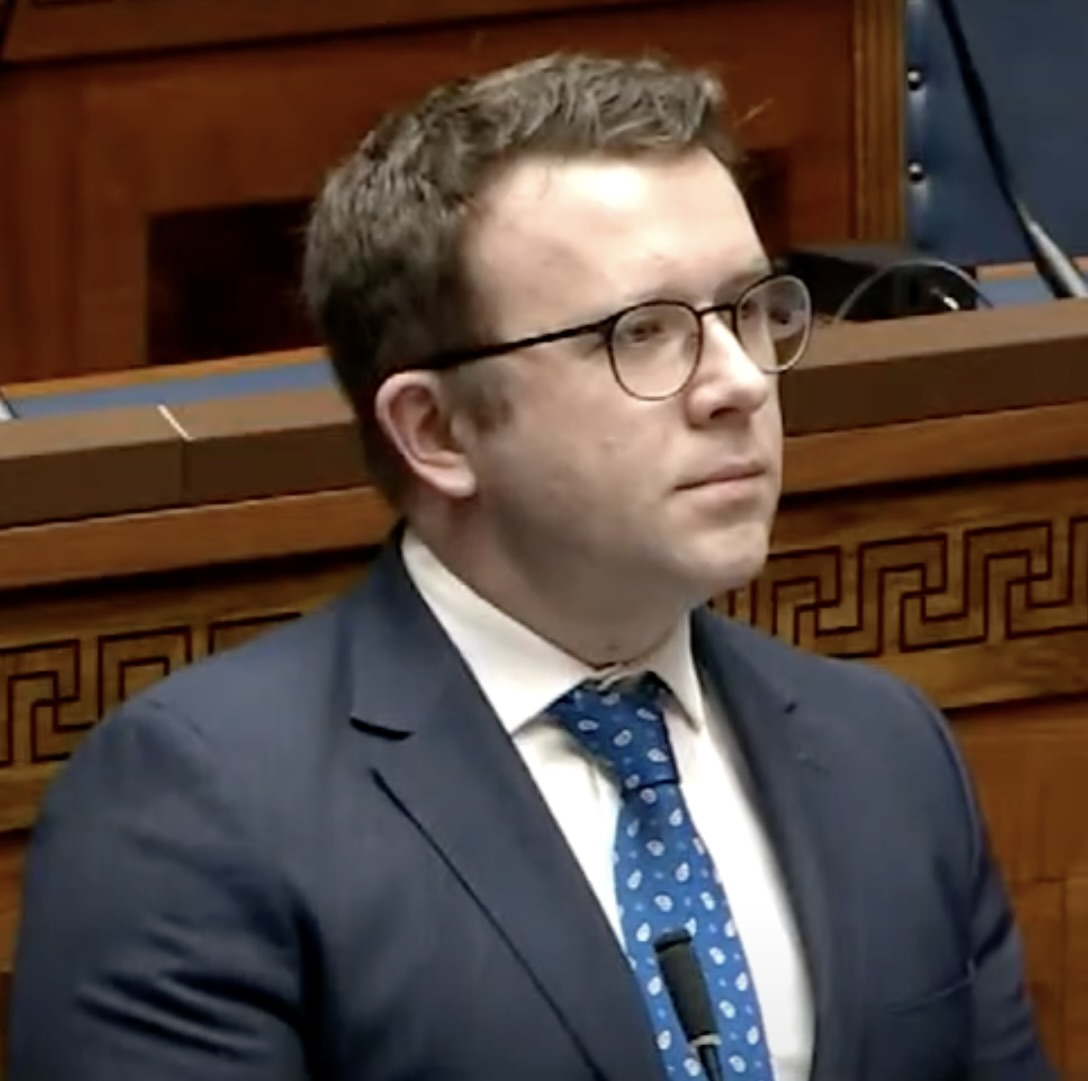

Member of the Northern Ireland Assembly for Belfast East
- Incumbent
- Assumed office 5 May 2022
- Preceded by: Chris Lyttle

39th Deputy Lord Mayor of Belfast
- In office 1 June 2019 – 1 June 2020
- Lord Mayor: John Finucane; Daniel Baker
- Preceded by: Emmet McDonough-Brown
- Succeeded by: Paul McCusker

Member of Belfast City Council
- In office 26 June 2016 – 7 May 2022
- Preceded by: Mervyn Jones
- Succeeded by: Jenna Maghie
- Constituency: Ormiston

Personal details
- Born: 21 March 1987 (age 39) Belfast, Northern Ireland, United Kingdom
- Party: Alliance
- Occupation: Politician

Peter McReynolds (born 21 March 1987) is a Northern Irish politician who is an Alliance Party Member of the Legislative Assembly (MLA). He was elected as an MLA in the 2022 Northern Ireland Assembly election for Belfast East.

== Early life and education ==
Peter McReynolds was born in Belfast in 1987, the son of Leonard and Helen McReynolds. He attended St Malachy's College, followed by Queen's University Belfast. He graduated with a BA in French and Linguistics in 2009, and gained an LLM in Human Rights Law in 2012.

== Political career ==
=== Early career (2014-2022) ===
McReynolds ran for election to the Oldpark DEA in Belfast City Council in the 2014 local elections as an Alliance Party candidate, but was unsuccessful and eliminated at the fifth stage. McReynolds was later co-opted into the Ormiston DEA on Belfast City Council on 26 June 2016, to replace Mervyn Jones after his death.

McReynolds was elected in the 2019 local elections for Orminston, and was elected on the first count with 1,764 first preference votes and he went on to be a Deputy Lord Mayor of Belfast from 2020 to 2021.

=== Member of the Legislative Assembly (2022-) ===
McReynolds was elected as an Alliance member for the Belfast East constituency at the 2022 Assembly elections, polling 13.46% of the first preference votes, retaining the seat vacated by Alliance MLA Chris Lyttle, who retired ahead of the election.

== Personal life ==
McReynolds lists his recreations as music, football, running, weightlifting and French language.
