= Carole Howard =

Former High Sheriff of Belfast

High Sheriff of Belfast
- In office 15 January 2018 – 16 January 2019
- Preceded by: Tom Haire
- Succeeded by: Tommy Sandford

Member of Belfast City Council
- In office 2 May 2019 – 18 May 2023
- Preceded by: Mairéad O'Donnell
- Succeeded by: Fiona McAteer
- Constituency: Titanic
- In office 22 May 2014 – 2 May 2019
- Preceded by: New district
- Succeeded by: Eric Hanvey
- Constituency: Lisnasharragh

Member of Castlereagh Borough Council
- In office 5 May 2011 – 22 May 2014
- Preceded by: Peter Robinson
- Succeeded by: Council abolished

Personal details
- Born: Belfast, Northern Ireland
- Party: Ulster Unionist (since 2021)
- Other political affiliations: Alliance Party (until 2021)

Carole Howard is a former Northern Irish politician who was High Sheriff of Belfast from January 2018 to 2019, as well as a Belfast City Councillor from 2014 until 2023, latterly for the Titanic DEA.

== Background ==
Howard first stood for election on behalf of the Alliance Party at the 2011 local elections, winning a seat in Castlereagh's Central District.

She was re-elected at the 2014 local elections, this time for the successor Lisnasharragh District in Belfast.

In January 2018, Howard was made High Sheriff of Belfast, making her the first Alliance representative to hold the office since 2000. She said: "It is a great honour to have been elected to the post of High Sheriff, and I pledge to serve the people of Belfast, and to support the Lord Mayor and Deputy Lord Mayor in carrying out my duties to the best of my ability. I will continue to work hard for our city during my time as High Sheriff, and hope to bring a positive contribution to making Belfast a better and brighter city for all its citizens."

She was elected on the sixth count for the Titanic District at the 2019 election.

In December 2021, Howard joined the Ulster Unionist Party (UUP), by asserting that she has pro-Union views and "feel that I can now openly and comfortably express them to help promote a confident, progressive brand of unionism." Leader Doug Beattie welcomed her to the party, saying: "I am absolutely delighted that Carole has decided to join the Ulster Unionist Party. Carole is exactly the type of elected representative we want to attract, encourage and promote. She has a long-established track record of dedicated public service and I am glad that she wishes to continue that public service with the Ulster Unionist Party." Alliance described Howard's decision as "an act of bad faith."

She unsuccessfully contested the Ormiston District at the 2023 local elections, being the last candidate eliminated, with 847 first-preference votes.
