= Micky Murray =

Northern Irish politician

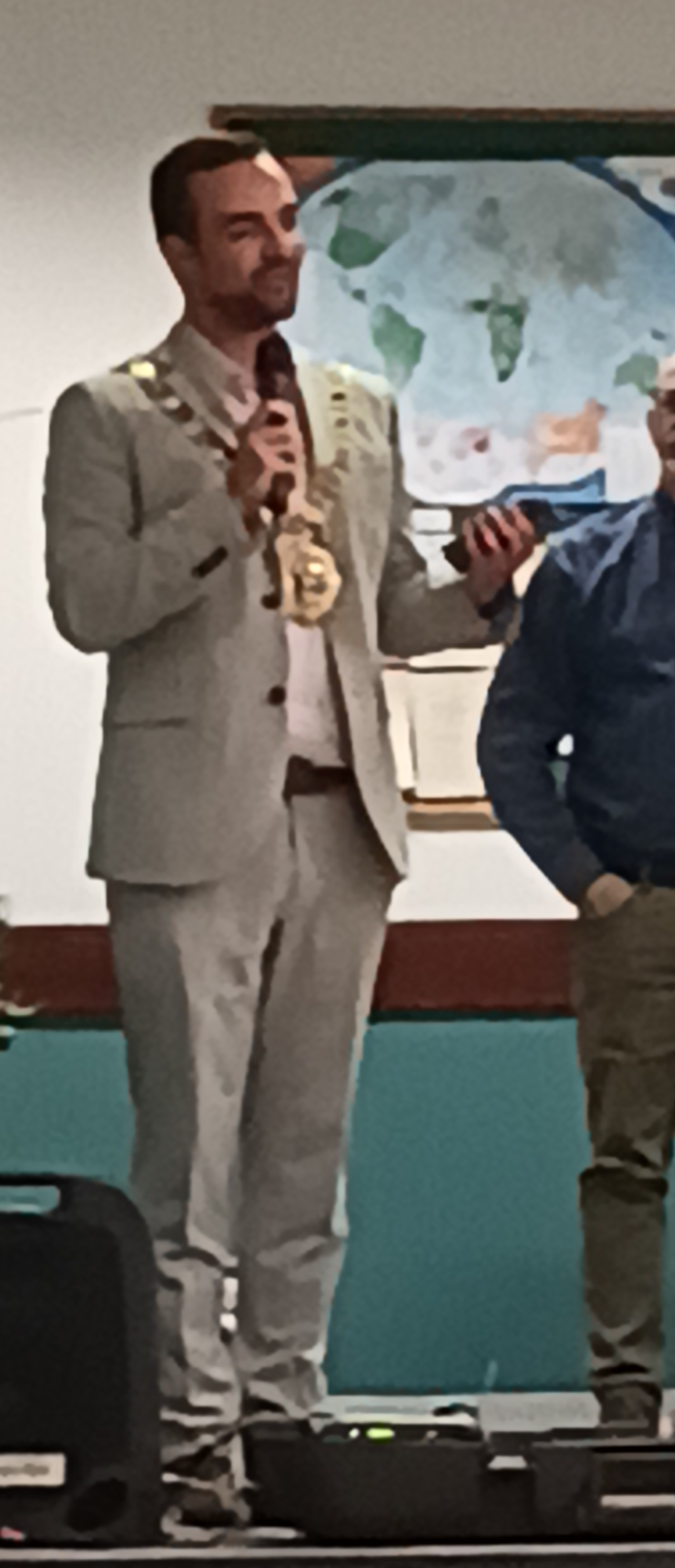

83rd Lord Mayor of Belfast
- In office 3 June 2024 – 2 June 2025
- Deputy: Andrew McCormick
- Preceded by: Ryan Murphy
- Succeeded by: Tracy Kelly

Member of Belfast City Council
- Incumbent
- Assumed office 27 May 2022
- Preceded by: Kate Nicholl
- Constituency: Balmoral

Personal details
- Born: Belfast, Northern Ireland
- Party: Alliance Party

Micky Murray is a Northern Irish politician who was Lord Mayor of Belfast from June 2024 to 2025. He is the city's first openly gay mayor. A member of the Alliance Party, he has been a Belfast City Councillor for the Balmoral DEA since May 2022

== Background ==
Murray's first election was in 2019, where he stood in Belfast's Botanic District. He was eliminated on the tenth count, polling 754 first-preference votes (7.7%).

He was co-opted onto Belfast City Council in May 2022, following the election of then lord mayor Kate Nicholl to the Northern Ireland Assembly. Murray was re-elected at the 2023 local elections, being the last candidate elected in the Balmoral District

=== Lord Mayor of Belfast ===
In April 2024, Murray was announced as the next Lord Mayor of Belfast, succeeding Ryan Murphy of Sinn Féin. As an openly gay man, Murray became the first member of the LGBTQ+ Community to hold the office of Lord Mayor. On his selection, he said: “I want to help transform Belfast into a more inclusive city where everyone can enjoy, regardless of who you are or where you’re from. We’re 26 years on from the Good Friday Agreement and we were promised peace, which has largely been delivered, but now is the time to further break down barriers and create a thriving city. Our city should be recognised for its inclusivity, rather than its division. As the first openly gay Lord Mayor, I want to use this platform to represent the LGBTQ+ community and be a positive role model for them.” He officially took office on 3 June 2024.

== Political views ==
Murray is an advocate for LGBTQ rights, condemning homophobia among political representatives in Northern Ireland and calling for greater understanding and inclusivity. He has criticised the right-wing rhetoric of figures like Donald Trump and expresses concern over the increasing anxiety felt by LGBTQ+ communities in the United States. Murray has also called for greater responsibility from social media platforms, particularly X (formerly Twitter), suggesting they should be regulated like traditional publishers due to their role in amplifying political division.

Murray supports a health-focused approach to drug reform. He backs the legalisation of marijuana for medicinal use, endorses the Portuguese model of drug decriminalisation, and argues for the introduction of safer injection centres in Belfast. He believes Northern Ireland’s current approach to addiction is outdated and emphasises the benefits of international harm reduction practices.
