= Adrian Long =

British civil engineer (1941–2022)

Adrian Long OBE
- Born: 15 April 1941; Dungannon, Northern Ireland
- Died: 23 April 2022 (aged 81); Dundonald, Northern Ireland
- Education: Queen's University Belfast (BSc, PhD)
- Spouse: Elaine Long
- Children: Michael; Alison
- Family: Naomi Long (daughter-in-law)
- Engineering career
- Discipline: Civil, structural
- Institutions: Queen's University Belfast; Institution of Civil Engineers (president)
- Significant design: FlexiArch
- Awards: ICE Gold Medal

Adrian Ernest Long OBE (15 April 1941 – 23 April 2022) was a civil engineer from Northern Ireland. A professor at Queen's University Belfast, he had a particular interest in concrete structures and patented FlexiArch, a pre-cast concrete arch product. He served as president of the Institution of Civil Engineers for 2002–03, the first Northern Irish engineer to do so.

== Biography ==
Long was born on 15 April 1941 in Dungannon, County Tyrone in Northern Ireland. He stated that he came from a carpentry and blacksmithing background.

In 1959, Long entered Queen's University Belfast (QUB) to study civil engineering. He graduated with first class honours and then took a PhD at Queens. In 1967, he moved to Canada, working as bridge designer for Fenco Engineering in Toronto.

However, he spent only a year in Canada, returning to Belfast in 1968 to become an associate professor of civil engineering at Queen's University Belfast (QUB). In 1976, he was promoted to a full professorship. His work was largely in the field of concrete structures, particularly in chloride resistance, maintenance problems and arch bridge structures. Long published 20 papers in journals managed by the Institution of Civil Engineers (ICE) and won eight of the institution's medals for these, including the ICE Gold Medal.

By 2002 Long was appointed dean of the faculty of engineering at QUB. In November of that year he was appointed president of the ICE for the 2002–2003 session; the first Northern Irish person to hold that position. Long was also a Fellow of the Royal Academy of Engineering and of the Institute for the Advancement of Engineering.

Long was appointed an officer of the Order of the British Empire in the 2006 New Year Honours for services to higher education and civil engineering. He resigned as professor at QUB in 2006 but remained there as an emeritus professor in the School of Natural and Built Environment. Since 2015, the ICE Northern Ireland awards the Adrian Long medal to the best paper in an ICE journal to be authored by a Northern Ireland member. The medal features a bust of Long.

Long was married to Elaine and had two children, Michael and Alison. Michael served as the 80th Lord Mayor of Belfast from 9 May to 1 June 2022. He also served as High Sheriff of Belfast in 2021 and served on Belfast City Council since 2001, where he was the Alliance group leader from 2015 to 2021. He is married to Alliance Party leader and justice minister Naomi Long.

Long died at the Ulster Hospital on 23 April 2022, at the age of 81.

== FlexiArch ==
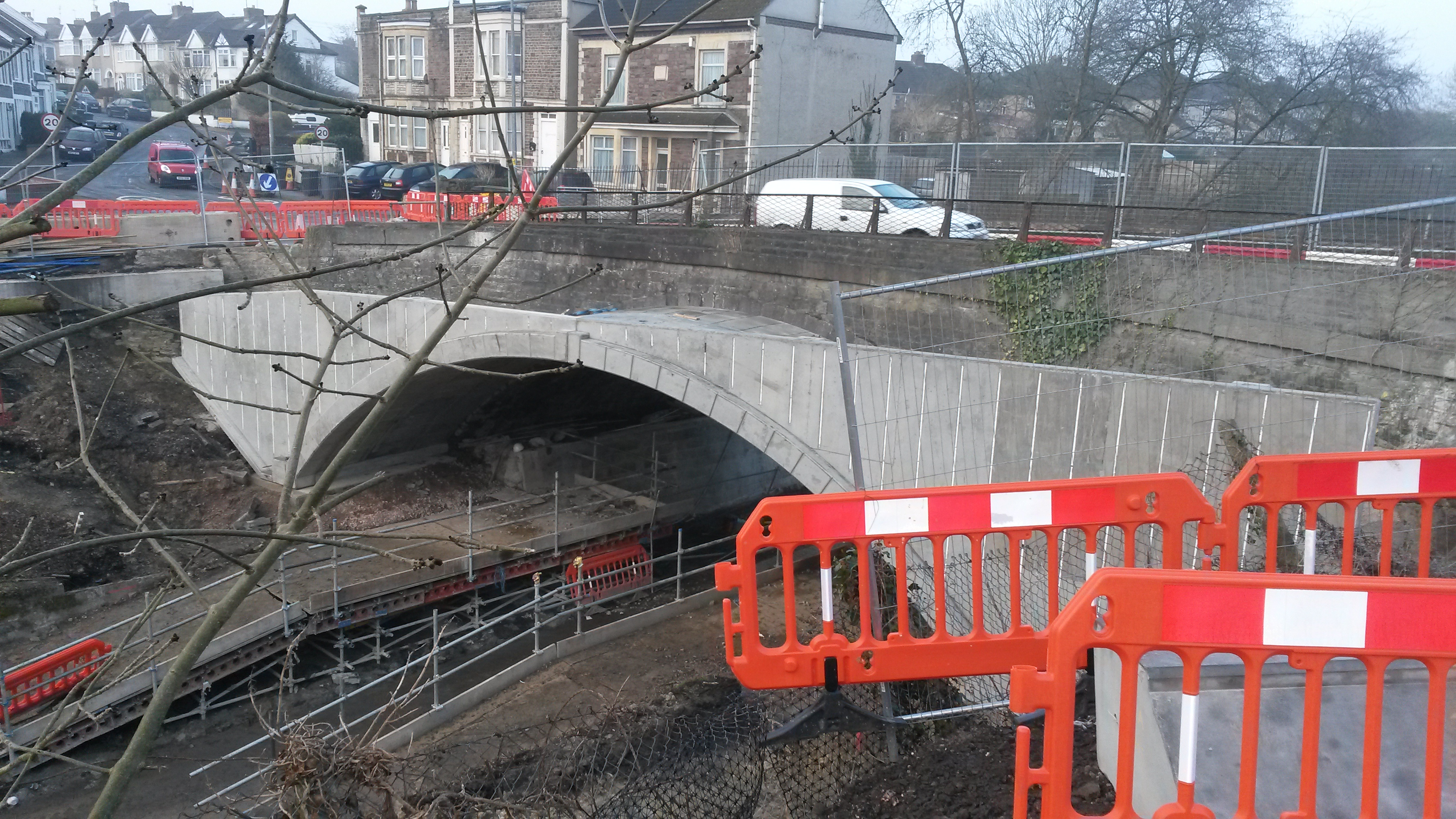
A FlexiArch bridge constructed adjacent to an existing structure in Soundwell, Gloucestershire

From 1997 Long worked on the FlexiArch, a pre-cast concrete arch in which the individual voussoirs are joined by a flexible polymeric membrane. The arch arrives to site flat packed and when lifted into position by a crane the gaps between the voussoirs close under gravity and form the correct arch profile. Long patented the product, which is produced by Irish pre-cast manufacturer Macrete, in 2004. The product can be constructed within a day and, containing no corrodable elements, has been stated to have a design lifespan of 300 years. More than 50 FlexiArch bridges have been constructed in the UK and Ireland and spans up to 30m are possible.

Professional and academic associations
Preceded by Mark Whitby	President of the Institution of Civil Engineers; November 2002 – November 2003	Succeeded by Douglas Oakervee
