= Tommy Sandford =

Former High Sheriff of Belfast

High Sheriff of Belfast
- In office 16 January 2019 – 16 January 2020
- Preceded by: Carole Howard
- Succeeded by: Nicola Verner

Member of Belfast City Council
- In office 22 May 2014 – 18 May 2023
- Preceded by: New district
- Succeeded by: Bradley Ferguson
- Constituency: Lisnasharragh

Member of Castlereagh Borough Council
- In office 5 May 2011 – 22 May 2014
- Preceded by: John Norris
- Succeeded by: Council abolished
- Constituency: Castlereagh Central
- In office 7 June 2001 – 5 May 2005
- Preceded by: Grant Dillon
- Succeeded by: Andrew Ramsey
- Constituency: Castlereagh Central

Personal details
- Born: March 1943 (age 83) Belfast, Northern Ireland
- Party: Democratic Unionist Party (since 2010)
- Other political affiliations: Progressive Unionist Party (until 2010)

Thomas Henry Sandford (born March 1943) is a former Democratic Unionist Party (DUP) politician and community activist who was High Sheriff of Belfast between January 2019 to 2020, and a Belfast City Councillor for the Lisnasharragh DEA from 2014 to 2023.

== Background ==
Sandford was involved with the Ulster Volunteer Force (UVF) during The Troubles, and later shared a cell with Gusty Spence in 1974.

=== Political career ===
Following his release, Sandford got involved in politics, eventually joining the Progressive Unionist Party (PUP). He was elected onto Castlereagh Borough Council at the 2001 local elections, representing the Castlereagh Central District. He served as the PUP's only councillor on the Authority, later losing his seat at the 2005 election.

In August 2010, Sandford resigned from the PUP, saying that the party's close association with the UVF was a "major factor" in his decision. He joined the Democratic Unionist Party (DUP) four months later. On joining the party, he said: "I believe that the message being set out by the DUP is one which unionists of all shades can unite behind, and indeed it is a message which resonates beyond just the unionist community to everyone who wishes to see a new and better Northern Ireland. In these difficult economic times it is reassuring to know that there is a party which has as its goal, the development and growth of our economy alongside ensuring that the most vulnerable in our society are protected."

He was selected by the DUP for the 2011 local elections, winning back his former seat in Castlereagh.

Sandford ran in Belfast's Lisnasharragh District at the 2014 local elections, being the fourth candidate elected.

In January 2019, he was appointed High Sheriff of Belfast after being nominated for the role by the secretary of state for Northern Ireland, Karen Bradley. Commenting on his appointment, Sandford said: “It’s an honour to be appointed as the High Sheriff of my beloved city,” he said: “I will do my utmost to serve all the people of Belfast, fulfilling the roles and responsibilities of this prestigious office to the best of my ability.” He retained his seat at the May 2019 local elections.

Sandford did not contest the 2023 local elections.
