= Nicola Verner =

Former High Sheriff of Belfast

High Sheriff of Belfast
- In office 16 January 2020 – January 2021
- Preceded by: Tommy Sandford
- Succeeded by: Michael Long

Member of Belfast City Council
- Incumbent
- Assumed office 2 May 2019
- Preceded by: Jolene Bunting
- Constituency: Court
- In office 27 September 2013 – 22 May 2014
- Preceded by: William Humphrey
- Succeeded by: Jolene Bunting
- Constituency: Court

Personal details
- Born: July 1976 (age 49); Woodvale, Belfast, Northern Ireland
- Political party: DUP

Nicola Angela Verner (born July 1976) is a Democratic Unionist Party (DUP) politician who was High Sheriff of Belfast from 2020 to 2021, as well as a Belfast City Councillor for the Court DEA since 2019.

== Background ==
Verner was co-opted onto Belfast City Council in September 2013, succeeding Court councillor William Humphrey. On her selection, she said: “As someone who has lived all my life in the Greater Shankill area, I am aware of his dedication to this community and I will work diligently to continue that reputation. I look forward to working closely with the local community in this new capacity and with the strong team of party colleagues locally and at City Hall. I am committed to the area, a community I am passionate about. This is reflected in my employment history and through my personal life and my connections to the area.” At the 2014 local elections, Verner lost her seat to the Traditional Unionist Voice's Jolene Bunting.

Verner returned to the Council at the 2019 local elections, being one of three DUP candidates to be elected in Court.

In January 2020, she was appointed High Sheriff of Belfast, becoming the 13th woman to serve in the position.

Verner retained her seat at the 2023 local elections, being elected on the first count.
