= Lisnasharragh (District Electoral Area) =

Electoral division in Belfast, Northern Ireland

- Belfast City Council DEA constituency

Current constituency
- Created: 2014
- Seats: 6 (2014–)
- Councillors: Séamas De Faoite (SDLP); Davy Douglas (DUP); Bradley Ferguson (DUP); Eric Hanvey (IND); Michael Long (APNI); Brian Smyth (GPNI)

Lisnasharragh is one of the ten district electoral areas (DEA) in Belfast, Northern Ireland. The district elects six members to Belfast City Council and contains the wards of Cregagh; Hillfoot; Merok; Orangefield; Ravenhill and Rosetta. Lisnasharragh forms part of the Belfast South and Belfast East constituencies for the Northern Ireland Assembly and UK Parliament.

It was created for the 2014 local elections. The Rosetta ward had previously been part of the Laganbank DEA, Orangefield and Ravenhill had been part of the Pottinger DEA, while the remaining wards had been part of the abolished Castlereagh Central DEA from Castlereagh Borough Council.

== Councillors ==
Election	Councillor (Party)	Councillor (Party)	Councillor (Party)	Councillor (Party)	Councillor (Party)	Councillor (Party)
June 2026 Defection	Séamas De Faoite (SDLP)	Michael Long (Alliance)	Eric Hanvey (Alliance)/ (Independent)	Brian Smyth (Green Party)	Davy Douglas (DUP)	Bradley Ferguson (DUP)
2023	Séamas De Faoite (SDLP)	Michael Long (Alliance)	Eric Hanvey (Alliance)/ (Independent)	Brian Smyth (Green Party)	Davy Douglas (DUP)	Bradley Ferguson (DUP)
June 2022 Co-Option	Séamas De Faoite (SDLP)	Michael Long (Alliance)	Eric Hanvey (Alliance)/ (Independent)	Brian Smyth (Green Party)	Sammy Douglas (DUP)	Tommy Sandford (DUP)
2019	Séamas De Faoite (SDLP)	Michael Long (Alliance)	Eric Hanvey (Alliance)/ (Independent)	Brian Smyth (Green Party)	David Brooks (DUP)	Tommy Sandford (DUP)
June 2017 Defection	Kate Mullan (SDLP)/ (Independent)	Michael Long (Alliance)	Carole Howard (Alliance)	Chris McGimpsey (UUP)	Aileen Graham (DUP)	Tommy Sandford (DUP)
2014	Kate Mullan (SDLP)/ (Independent)	Michael Long (Alliance)	Carole Howard (Alliance)	Chris McGimpsey (UUP)	Aileen Graham (DUP)	Tommy Sandford (DUP)

== 2023 Results ==
2019: 2 x Alliance, 2 x DUP, 1 x SDLP, 1 x Green

2023: 2 x Alliance, 2 x DUP, 1 x SDLP, 1 x Green

2019–2023 Change: No Change

Lisnasharragh - 6 seats
Party	Candidate	FPv%	Count					
Party	Candidate	FPv%	1	2	3	4	5	6
DUP	Davy Douglas	17.39%	2,083					
DUP	Bradley Ferguson	8.85%	1,060	1,391.84	1,649.26	1,992.26		
Alliance	Michael Long*	12.00%	1,437	1,439.21	1,462.21	1,602.57	1,638.57	1,971.57
Alliance	Eric Hanvey* ‡	9.00%	1,078	1,078.68	1,099.02	1,160.36	1,205.36	1,747.36
SDLP	Séamas de Faoite*	13.19%	1,580	1,580.17	1,598.34	1,629.51	1,635.51	1,669.51
Green (NI)	Brian Smyth*	9.66%	1,157	1,158.19	1,273.53	1,422.91	1,491.91	1,588.76
Sinn Féin	Stevie Jenkins	10.28%	1,231	1,231.17	1,250.17	1,250.17	1,250.17	1,258.17
Alliance	Anna McErlean	8.03%	961	961.85	965.85	1,037.87	1,054.87	
UUP	Bill Manwaring	6.85%	820	828.67	921.71			
TUV	Stephen Ferguson	3.07%	368	375.14				
People Before Profit	Nick Cropper	1.67%	200	200.34				
Electorate: 21,488 Valid: 11,975 (55.73%) Spoilt: 116 Quota: 1,711 Turnout: 12,091 (56.27%)

== 2019 Results ==
2014: 2 x Alliance, 2 x DUP, 1 x SDLP, 1 x UUP

2019: 2 x Alliance, 2 x DUP, 1 x SDLP, 1 x Green

2014-2019 Change: Green gain from UUP

Lisnasharragh - 6 seats
Party	Candidate	FPv%	Count									
Party	Candidate	FPv%	1	2	3	4	5	6	7	8	9	10
Alliance	Michael Long*	15.86%	1,755									
Alliance	Eric Hanvey	12.91%	1,429	1,556.98	1,582.98							
Green (NI)	Brian Smyth	11.14%	1,233	1,243.35	1,291.98	1,304.98	1,423.25	1,484.24	1,501.42	1,521.51	1,679.51	
DUP	David Brooks †	13.37%	1,479	1,479.72	1,481.72	1,503.81	1,507.81	1,510.9	1,563.9	1,577.9	1,578.9	1,774.9
DUP	Tommy Sandford*	8.59%	951	951.9	954.9	985.9	989.9	991.9	1,104.99	1,118.99	1,123.99	1,588.99
SDLP	Séamas De Faoite	8.93%	988	993.76	1,005.12	1,005.12	1,017.21	1,098.02	1,100.11	1,100.29	1,521.27	1,523.45
UUP	Chris McGimpsey*	4.59%	508	509.98	510.07	528.25	539.25	545.34	591.34	1,017.33	1,018.42	1,089.69
DUP	Aileen Graham*	5.96%	660	660.63	663.63	684.63	687.72	694.72	753.81	772.99	775.17	
Sinn Féin	Stevie Jenkins	5.59%	619	621.52	625.52	626.52	636.52	647.7	647.79	647.79		
UUP	Ben Manton	3.75%	415	416.44	419.44	434.44	440.44	451.44	520.44			
PUP	Gwen Ferguson	3.28%	363	363.63	364.72	387.72	393.72	395.72				
Independent	Kate Mullan*	1.84%	204	206.16	207.25	209.34	219.43					
Labour Alternative	Amy Ferguson	1.45%	160	160.27	191.54	195.54						
UKIP	Catherine McComb	1.52%	169	169.45	169.45							
People Before Profit	Ivanka Antova	1.20%	133	134.71								
Electorate: 20,783 Valid: 11,066 (53.25%) Spoilt: 116 Quota: 1,581 Turnout: 11,182 (53.80%)

== 2014 results ==
2014: 2 x DUP, 2 x Alliance, 1 x UUP, 1 x SDLP

Lisnasharragh - 6 seats
Party	Candidate	FPv%	Count								
Party	Candidate	FPv%	1	2	3	4	5	6	7	8	9
Alliance	Michael Long*	16.44%	1,726								
DUP	Aileen Graham	14.73%	1,546								
UUP	Chris McGimpsey*	12.98%	1,362	1,370.19	1,384.2	1,432.1	1,462.4	1,464.37	1,764.37		
Alliance	Carole Howard*	8.19%	860	1,016.52	1,032.7	1,157.2	1,412.4	1,413.24	1,427.5	1,547.5	
SDLP	Kate Mullan* ‡	8.36%	878	899.58	901.71	931.88	1,019.8	1,019.89	1,029.89	1,500.89	
DUP	Tommy Sandford*	9.34%	980	983.12	994.12	1,013.3	1,024.3	1,041.8	1,226.43	1,230.69	1,354.69
DUP	Colin Hussey	8.73%	916	918.34	927.47	944.6	960.6	985.59	1,071.68	1,071.68	1,152.68
Sinn Féin	Dermot Kennedy	6.07%	637	642.59	642.59	649.85	693.11	693.11	697.14		
PUP	Helen Smyth	6.00%	630	631.04	641.04	660.17	684.3	684.72			
Green (NI)	Connal Hughes	4.62%	485	497.35	503.48	590.17					
NI21	Leah McDonnell	3.00%	315	323.45	414.71						
NI21	Pete Wray	1.54%	162	163.82							
Electorate: 20,089 Valid: 10,497 (52.25%) Spoilt: 159 Quota: 1,500 Turnout: 10,656 (53.04%)
