= Tina Black =

Irish politician

Cllr Tina Black
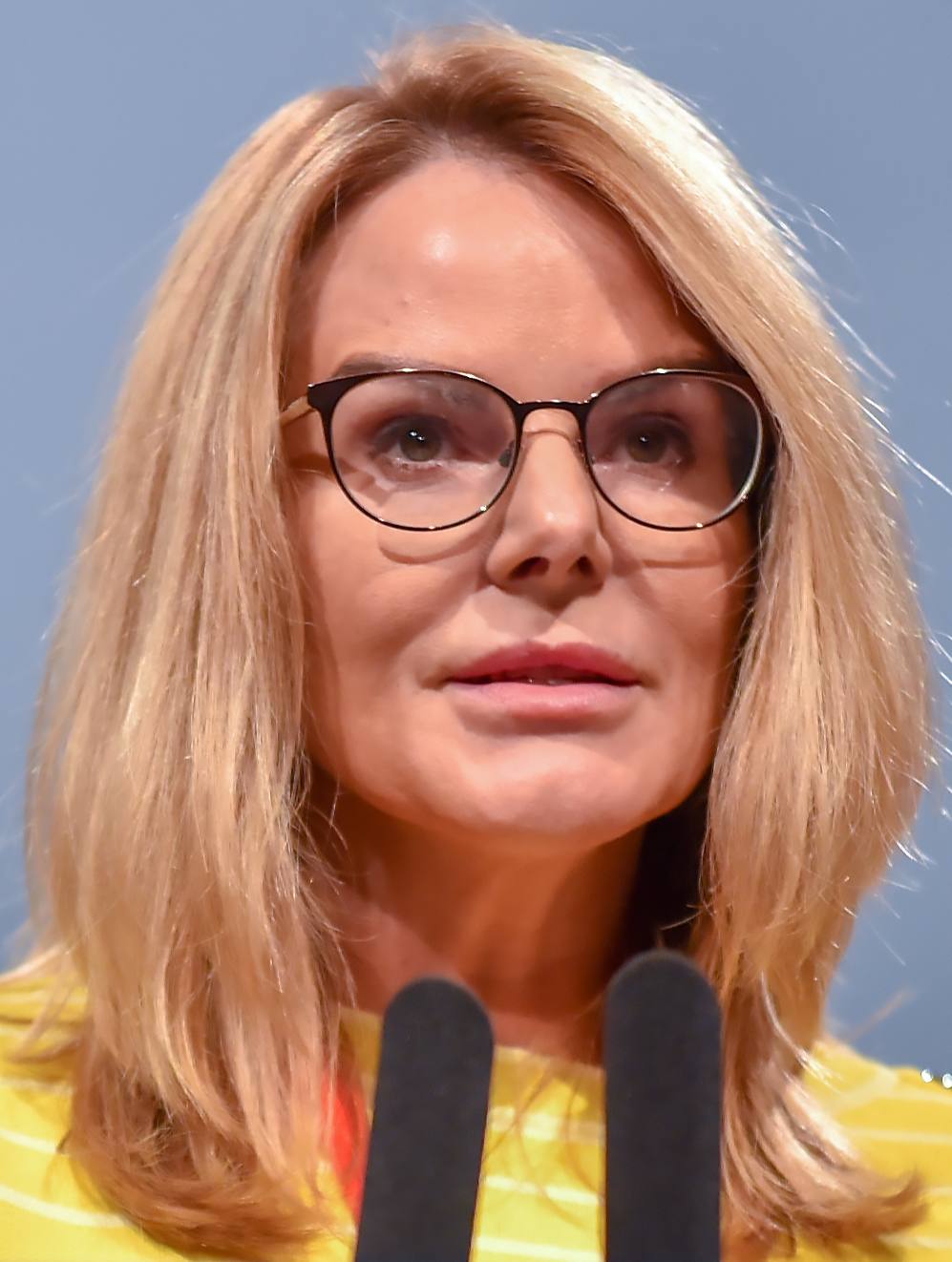
- Black in 2019

81st Lord Mayor of Belfast
- In office 1 June 2022 – 5 June 2023
- Deputy: Michelle Kelly
- Preceded by: Michael Long
- Succeeded by: Ryan Murphy

Member of Belfast City Council
- Incumbent
- Assumed office 28 November 2018
- Preceded by: Mary McConville
- Constituency: Court

Personal details
- Born: 1976 or 1977 Belfast, Northern Ireland
- Party: Sinn Féin
- Education: Queen's University Belfast (BA, MSc)

Christina Black is an Irish Sinn Féin politician and community worker. She has served as a member of Belfast City Council representing the Court constituency since 2018. Black previously served as the 81st Lord Mayor of Belfast from 1 June 2022 to 5 June 2023.

== Biography ==
Black received her Bachelor of Arts degree in politics from the Queen's University Belfast, followed by a Master of Science in community and social development from 2006 to 2009.

Black managed a community centre on the Grosvenor Road.

== Political career ==
In 2018, Black was co-opted onto Belfast City Council to fill a vacancy left by the resignation of Mary McConville. In May 2019, she was elected outright on the final count in the Court constituency.

=== Lord Mayor of Belfast ===
Black was elected as the 81st Lord Mayor of Belfast in June 2022. Upon assuming the office of Lord Mayor, Black pledged to work "night and day for everyone in the city" and stated a desire to "lead an inclusive agenda of positive and progressive change".

On 1 July 2022, Councillor Black and presumptive First Minister Michelle O'Neill laid a wreath in commemoration of the Battle of the Somme, marking the first time two Irish nationalist politicians had jointly attended such an event.
