= Michael Long (Northern Ireland politician) =

Former Lord Mayor of Belfast

Cllr Michael Long
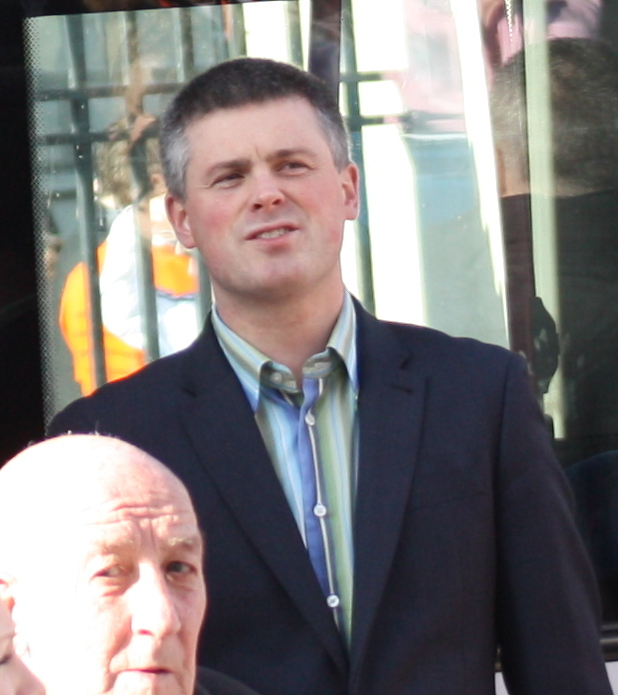
- Long in 2010

80th Lord Mayor of Belfast
- In office 9 May 2022 – 1 June 2022
- Deputy: Tom Haire
- Preceded by: Kate Nicholl
- Succeeded by: Tina Black

121st High Sheriff of Belfast
- In office January 2021 – January 2022
- Preceded by: Nicola Verner
- Succeeded by: John Hussey

Leader of the Alliance Party on Belfast City Council
- Incumbent
- Assumed office 22 May 2014
- Leader: David Ford; Naomi Long

Member of Belfast City Council
- Incumbent
- Assumed office 22 May 2014
- Preceded by: New district
- Constituency: Lisnasharragh

Member of Castlereagh Borough Council
- In office 7 June 2001 – 22 May 2014
- Preceded by: Patrick Mitchell
- Succeeded by: Council abolished
- Constituency: Castlereagh Central

Personal details
- Born: Kingston, Ontario, Canada
- Party: Alliance
- Spouse: Naomi Johnston (m. 1995)
- Parent(s): Adrian Long; Elaine Long
- Occupation: Politician

Michael Andrew Long is a politician from Northern Ireland who served as the 80th Lord Mayor of Belfast from 9 May 2022 to 1 June 2022, finishing the remaining three weeks of Kate Nicholl's term after she was elected to the Northern Ireland Assembly in May 2022. Long has served as leader of the Alliance Party on Belfast City Council, and a Belfast City Councillor for the Lisnasharragh DEA since 2014.

== Early life and education ==
Michael Long was born in Kingston, Ontario in Canada to mother Elaine and father Adrian.

== Political career ==
=== Member of Belfast City Council (2014-) ===
In May 2014, Long was elected to Belfast City Council to represent the constituency of Lisnasharragh. Long would become the leader of Alliance in Belfast City Council.

=== Lord Mayor of Belfast (2022) ===
In May 2022, incumbent Lord Mayor of Belfast Kate Nicholl was elected as an Alliance MLA for Belfast South. Her term was due to end on 1 June but was cut short due to rules prohibiting double-jobbing that forbid her from remaining as Lord Mayor of Belfast after being elected to the Assembly.

Michael Long was installed as the 80th Lord Mayor of Belfast on 9 May 2022 to serve the remaining three weeks in Nicholl's term. Long's three-week tenure made him the shortest serving Lord Mayor of Belfast. He is also the first spouse of a former Lord Mayor of Belfast to also serve in the post. Long's wife Naomi held the position from June 2009 to June 2010. When Long was installed as Lord Mayor on 9 May 2022, he spoke in both English and Irish and said that his predecessor was an "inspiration". Following on from Kate Nicholl, who was born in Zimbabwe, Long was the second Lord Mayor of Belfast in a row to be foreign-born.

On 1 June 2022, Long was succeeded by Tina Black of Sinn Féin as Lord Mayor of Belfast.

== Personal life ==
Long met his wife Naomi when they were teenagers and they married in 1995. Naomi is the current leader of the Alliance Party, and a Member of the Northern Ireland Assembly (MLA) for Belfast East.

On 23 April 2022, Long's father Adrian, a civil engineer, died. His funeral was held on 5 May, the same day as the 2022 Assembly election.

Long revealed candidly with, together with his wife, that on 8 March 2024 he had suffered a massive seizure and heaped praise on the paramedics and staff of the Neurology Department of the Ulster Hospital for the treatment he received. He also revealed he had previously suffered from a seizure in 2020. On 11 February 2026 Alliance and DUP elected members and staff of Belfast City Council held the first-ever webinar for staff-training organised through Epilepsy Action to assist in staff-training and raising awareness for International Epilepsy Day.
