= 1989 Castlereagh Borough Council election =

Local government election in Northern Ireland

← 1985	17 May 1989	1993 →

All 21 seats to Castlereagh Borough Council 11 seats needed for a majority
	First party	Second party	Third party
Party	DUP	UUP	Alliance
Seats won	9	6	4
Seat change	▼1	▼2	▲1
	Fourth party	Fifth party
Party	UPUP	Ind. Unionist
Seats won	1	1
Seat change	▲1	▲1

Elections to Castlereagh Borough Council were held on 17 May 1989 on the same day as the other Northern Irish local government elections. The election used three district electoral areas to elect a total of 21 councillors.

== Election results ==
Castlereagh Borough Council Election Result 1989
Party	Seats	Gains	Losses	Net gain/loss	Seats %	Votes %	Votes	+/−
DUP	9	0	1	▼1	42.9	45.0	9,077	▼3.0
UUP	6	0	2	▼2	28.6	27.0	5,452	▼2.0
Alliance	4	0	1	▲1	19.0	21.5	4,330	▲2.7
Ind. Unionist	1	1	0	▲1	4.8	4.0	796	▲2.3
UPUP	1	1	0	▲1	4.8	2.5	509	▲2.5

Note: "Votes" are the first preference votes.

== Districts summary ==
Results of the Castlereagh Borough Council election, 1989 by district
Ward	%	Cllrs	%	Cllrs	%	Cllrs	%	Cllrs	%	Cllrs	Total Cllrs
Ward	DUP		UUP		Alliance		UPUP		Others		Total Cllrs
Castlereagh Central	60.1	4	20.0	2	19.9	1	0.0	0	0.0	0	7
Castlereagh East	43.7	3	14.7	1	18.1	1	9.2	1	14.3	1	7
Castlereagh South	32.8	2	42.0	3	25.2	2	0.0	0	0.0	0	7
Total	45.0	9	27.0	6	21.5	4	2.5	1	4.0	1	21

== Districts results ==
=== Castlereagh Central ===
1985: 4 x DUP, 2 x UUP, 1 x Alliance
1989: 4 x DUP, 2 x UUP, 1 x Alliance
1985-1989 Change: No change

Castlereagh Central - 7 seats
Party	Candidate	FPv%	Count							
Party	Candidate	FPv%	1	2	3	4	5	6	7	8
DUP	Peter Robinson*	50.75%	3,461							
UUP	Grant Dillon*	13.40%	914							
Alliance	Patrick Mitchell	13.33%	909							
DUP	Alan Carson*	4.06%	277	1,895.04						
DUP	Joyce Boyd	2.70%	184	497.88	1,371.06					
UUP	Ellen Gray*	6.64%	453	616.4	657.56	684.26	733.46	970.46		
DUP	Paul McNaughten	0.38%	26	124.8	192.42	646.32	647.16	666.92	729.71	759.29
DUP	Cecil Moore	2.20%	150	510.24	553.85	583.55	584.81	621.55	675.24	699.55
Alliance	Ann Smith	6.54%	446	474.88	479.29	481.09	482.53			
Electorate: 14,462 Valid: 6,820 (47.16%) Spoilt: 188 Quota: 853 Turnout: 7,008 (48.46%)

=== Castlereagh East ===
1985: 3 x DUP, 3 x UUP, 1 x Alliance
1989: 3 x DUP, 1 x Alliance, 1 x UUP, 1 x UPUP, 1 x Independent Unionist
1985-1989 Change: UPUP and Independent Unionist gain from UUP (two seats)

Castlereagh East - 7 seats
Party	Candidate	FPv%	Count								
Party	Candidate	FPv%	1	2	3	4	5	6	7	8	9
DUP	Iris Robinson	21.05%	1,168								
DUP	Matthew Anderson*	16.91%	938								
Ind. Unionist	William Abraham*	13.63%	756								
Alliance	William Boyd	13.50%	749								
UUP	John Bell	9.03%	501	522.32	535.58	538.1	563.86	626.15	643.75	868.75	
UPUP	Tommy Jeffers	9.17%	509	530.73	537.23	539.64	552.04	643.35	663.7	695.7	
DUP	John Boyle*	3.53%	196	344.42	527.46	532.76	539.24	548.66	550.86	592.4	650.4
DUP	Mark Robinson	2.20%	122	371.28	402.22	407.04	410.88	421.71	424.24	457.28	492.28
UUP	Alexander Murray	5.62%	312	332.91	335.77	347.03	353.27	384.43	393.12		
Alliance	Muriel Wilkes	4.63%	257	263.56	265.64	272.64	274.4				
Ind. Unionist	Michael Brooks	0.72%	40	41.23	43.83						
Electorate: 14,754 Valid: 5,548 (37.60%) Spoilt: 155 Quota: 694 Turnout: 5,703 (38.65%)

=== Castlereagh South ===
1985: 3 x DUP, 3 x UUP, 1 x Alliance
1989: 3 x UUP, 2 x DUP, 2 x Alliance
1985-1989 Change: Alliance gain from DUP

Castlereagh South - 7 seats
Party	Candidate	FPv%	Count						
Party	Candidate	FPv%	1	2	3	4	5	6	7
UUP	John Taylor	26.15%	2,039						
DUP	Ernest Harper*	25.06%	1,954						
Alliance	David Andrews*	17.50%	1,364						
DUP	Myreve Chambers*	5.54%	432	484.47	1,258.97				
Alliance	Geraldine Rice	7.76%	605	633.62	638.12	978.04			
UUP	Jean Clarke	8.56%	667	928.82	954.82	972.18	976.14		
UUP	Frederick Kane*	5.16%	402	812.22	838.72	851.88	857.46	870.46	1,013.46
DUP	Thomas Scott	1.37%	107	154.7	220.7	223.22	453.62	585.13	600.13
UUP	Marie Luney	2.10%	164	396.67	408.17	410.69	412.31	422.23	
DUP	Gillian McCorkell	0.80%	62	83.2	141.2	142.6	178.6		
Electorate: 17,232 Valid: 7,796 (45.24%) Spoilt: 210 Quota: 975 Turnout: 8,006 (46.46%)
