= 2001 Castlereagh Borough Council election =

Local government election in Northern Ireland

← 1997	7 June 2001	2005 →

All 23 seats to Castlereagh Borough Council 12 seats needed for a majority
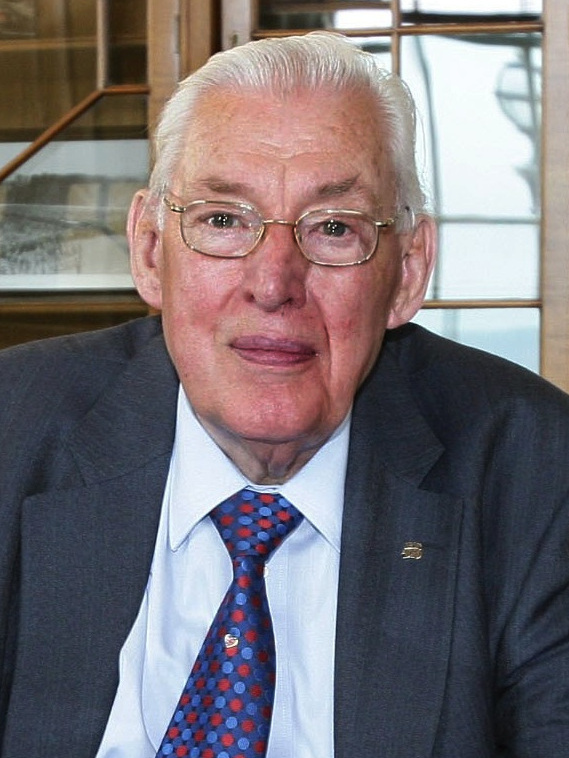

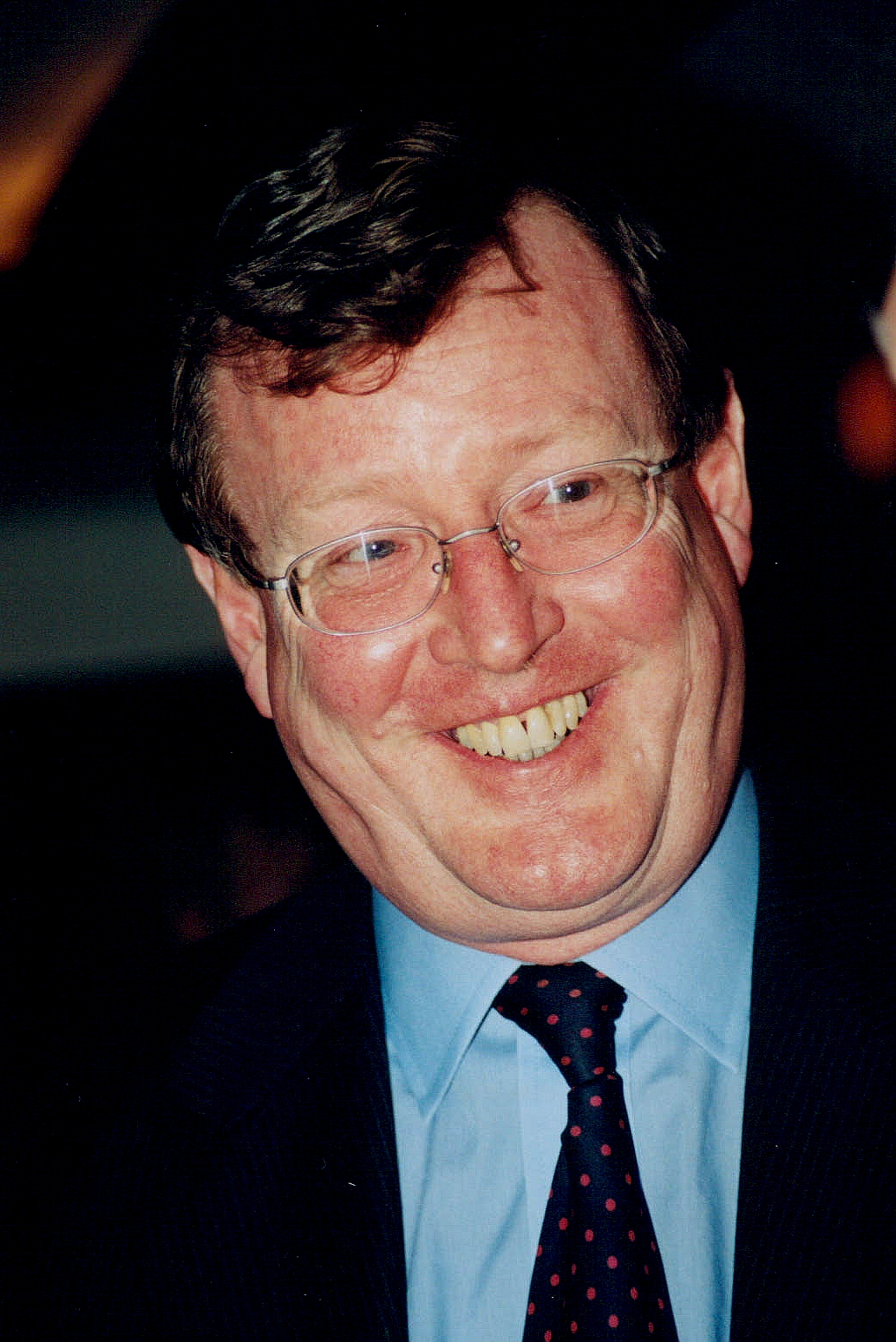

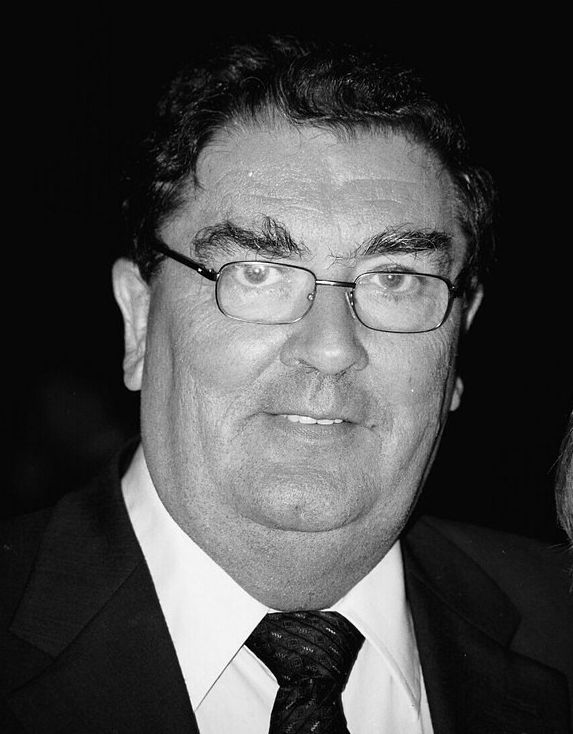

	First party	Second party	Third party
Leader	Ian Paisley	David Trimble	Seán Neeson
Party	DUP	UUP	Alliance
Seats won	10	5	4
Seat change	0	0	0
Percentage	39.4%	22.1%	15.2%
Swing	▼4.8%	▲2.5%	▼3.5%
	Fourth party	Fifth party	Sixth party
Leader	John Hume	Hugh Smyth	N/A
Party	SDLP	PUP	Independent
Seats won	2	1	1
Seat change	0	▲1	▲1
Percentage	11.4%	4.2%	3.6%
Swing	▲3.2%	▼2.4%	▲3.0%
- 2001 Castlereagh City Council Election Results, shaded by First Preference Votes.

Elections to Castlereagh Borough Council were held on 7 June 2001 on the same day as the other Northern Irish local government elections. The election used four district electoral areas to elect a total of 23 councillors.

== Election results ==
Castlereagh Borough Council Election Result 2001
Party	Seats	Gains	Losses	Net gain/loss	Seats %	Votes %	Votes	+/−
DUP	10	0	0	0	43.5	39.4	12,084	▼4.8
UUP	5	0	0	0	21.7	22.1	6,795	▲2.5
Alliance	4	0	0	0	17.4	15.2	4,622	▼3.5
SDLP	2	0	0	0	8.7	11.4	3,512	▲3.2
PUP	1	1	0	▲1	4.3	4.2	1,272	▼2.4
Independent	1	1	0	▲1	4.3	3.6	1,114	▲3.0
Sinn Féin	0	0	0	0	0.0	1.8	554	▲1.8
NI Women's Coalition	0	0	0	0	0.0	1.0	306	New
UK Unionist	0	0	1	▼1	0.0	0.9	289	▼0.4
NI Conservatives	0	0	0	0	0.0	0.4	134	▲0.4

Note: "Votes" are the first preference votes.

== Districts summary ==
Results of the Castlereagh Borough Council election, 2001 by district
Ward	%	Cllrs	%	Cllrs	%	Cllrs	%	Cllrs	%	Cllrs	%	Cllrs	Total Cllrs
Ward	DUP		UUP		Alliance		SDLP		PUP		Others		Total Cllrs
Castlereagh Central	50.4	3	15.4	1	11.5	1	6.4	0	7.5	1	8.8	0	6
Castlereagh East	50.2	4	20.5	1	14.4	1	0.0	0	5.1	0	9.8	1	7
Castlereagh South	26.3	1	27.0	2	17.6	1	23.6	1	0.0	0	5.5	0	5
Castlereagh West	29.4	2	25.3	1	16.6	1	17.5	1	4.4	0	6.8	0	5
Total	39.4	10	22.1	5	15.2	4	11.4	2	4.2	1	7.7	1	23

== Districts results ==
=== Castlereagh Central ===
1997: 4 x DUP, 1 x Alliance, 1 x UUP, 1 x UKUP
2001: 4 x DUP, 1 x Alliance, 1 x UUP, 1 x PUP
1997-2001 Change: PUP gain from UKUP

Castlereagh Central - 6 seats
Party	Candidate	FPv%	Count							
Party	Candidate	FPv%	1	2	3	4	5	6	7	8
DUP	Peter Robinson*	42.40%	2,841							
UUP	Michael Copeland	15.40%	1,032							
DUP	John Norris*	2.40%	161	949.8	976.8					
Alliance	Michael Long	11.48%	769	798.82	879.68	904.16	1,274.16			
DUP	Joanne Bunting	4.51%	302	737.2	772.52	778.36	779.8	780.8	1,151.16	
PUP	Tommy Sandford	7.54%	505	564.16	590.56	599.84	612.24	674.24	695.24	719.72
UK Unionist	Grant Dillon*	4.31%	289	393.04	488.96	512.96	515.04	547.04	572.44	661.52
DUP	John Dunn*	1.10%	74	437.12	467.8	473.08	476.44	480.44		
SDLP	Sean Mullan	6.37%	427	431.08	436.44	438.6				
Independent	Alan Carson*	3.27%	219	277.48						
NI Conservatives	Terence Dick	1.22%	82	95.8						
Electorate: 10,528 Valid: 6,701 (63.65%) Spoilt: 237 Quota: 958 Turnout: 6,938 (65.90%)

=== Castlereagh East ===
1997: 4 x DUP, 1 x UUP, 1 x Alliance, 1 x Independent Unionist
2001: 4 x DUP, 1 x UUP, 1 x Alliance, 1 x Independent
1997-2001 Change: Independent gain from Independent Unionist

Castlereagh East - 7 seats
Party	Candidate	FPv%	Count						
Party	Candidate	FPv%	1	2	3	4	5	6	7
DUP	Iris Robinson*	44.69%	4,093						
UUP	David Drysdale	20.52%	1,879						
Alliance	Peter Osborne*	10.08%	923	1,018.25	1,165.21				
DUP	Jim White	0.95%	87	1,044.75	1,098.87	1,140.08	1,169.08		
DUP	Kim Morton*	1.31%	120	690.75	727.71	768.85	1,078.22	1,091.66	1,197.58
DUP	Claire Ennis	2.23%	204	751.5	803.42	847.76	1,035.54	1,043.22	1,113.07
Independent	Francis Gallagher	7.10%	650	755	806.04	871.94	885.01	885.97	1,082.17
Alliance	Gillian Graham	4.37%	400	439.75	626.75	695.33	711.28	712.24	840.05
PUP	Richard Johnston	5.09%	466	538	626.88	669.32	690.22	691.18	
DUP	Sandy Geddis*	1.00%	92	569	601.12	632.7			
Independent	William Abraham*	2.67%	245	310.25	388.57				
Electorate: 15,245 Valid: 9,159 (60.08%) Spoilt: 249 Quota: 1,145 Turnout: 9,408 (61.71%)

=== Castlereagh South ===
1997: 2 x UUP, 1 x DUP, 1 x SDLP, 1 x Alliance
2001: 2 x UUP, 1 x DUP, 1 x SDLP, 1 x Alliance
1997-2001 Change: No change

Castlereagh South - 5 seats
Party	Candidate	FPv%	Count								
Party	Candidate	FPv%	1	2	3	4	5	6	7	8	9
UUP	Michael Henderson*	21.58%	1,725								
DUP	John Beattie*	19.89%	1,590								
Alliance	Geraldine Rice*	12.75%	1,019	1,038.32	1,046.01	1,049.05	1,068.05	1,371.05			
UUP	Barbara McBurney	5.39%	431	766.57	796.56	815.28	815.28	857.27	1,366		
SDLP	Brian Hanvey	11.76%	940	942.3	942.3	942.78	1,145.01	1,156.47	1,160.11	1,171.51	1,178.17
SDLP	Christine Copeland	11.87%	949	950.38	951.38	951.54	1,090.54	1,108.48	1,114.85	1,139.72	1,163.72
DUP	Andrew Ramsey	6.37%	509	522.34	527.03	753.27	753.27	763.6			
Alliance	Margaret Marshall	4.77%	381	384.11	399.8	401.4	406.4				
Sinn Féin	Sean Hayes	4.95%	396	396.23	396.23	396.23					
NI Conservatives	Roger Lomas	0.65%	52	57.52							
Electorate: 12,212 Valid: 7,992 (65.44%) Spoilt: 159 Quota: 1,333 Turnout: 8,151 (66.75%)

=== Castlereagh West ===
1997: 2 x DUP, 1 x UUP, 1 x SDLP, 1 x Alliance
2001: 2 x DUP, 1 x UUP, 1 x SDLP, 1 x Alliance
1997-2001 Change: No change

Castlereagh West - 5 seats
Party	Candidate	FPv%	Count					
Party	Candidate	FPv%	1	2	3	4	5	6
DUP	Mark Robinson	27.20%	1,858					
UUP	Cecil Hall*	25.30%	1,728					
SDLP	Rosaleen Hughes*	17.51%	1,196					
Alliance	Sara Duncan*	16.54%	1,130	1,141.31				
DUP	Vivienne Stevenson	0.89%	61	603.88	840.76	841.6	1,075.37	1,276.18
NI Women's Coalition	Eileen Cairnduff	4.48%	306	311.85	463.47	570.89	577.96	672.08
PUP	Frederick Ferguson	4.41%	301	324.01	452.53	459.53	469	
DUP	Charles Tosh	1.35%	92	223.82	280.52	280.94		
Sinn Féin	Sean Montgomery	2.31%	158	158	162.62			
Electorate: 10,958 Valid: 6,830 (62.33%) Spoilt: 164 Quota: 1,139 Turnout: 6,994 (63.83%)
