= 1993 Castlereagh Borough Council election =

Local government election in Northern Ireland

← 1989	19 May 1993	1997 →

All 23 seats to Castlereagh Borough Council 12 seats needed for a majority
	First party	Second party	Third party
Party	DUP	UUP	Alliance
Seats won	9	6	5
Seat change	0	0	▲1
	Fourth party	Fifth party
Party	Ind. Unionist	UPUP
Seats won	2	1
Seat change	▲1	0
- Party with the most votes by district.

Elections to Castlereagh Borough Council were held on 19 May 1993 on the same day as the other Northern Irish local government elections. The election used four district electoral areas to elect a total of 23 councillors.

== Election results ==
Castlereagh Borough Council Election Result 1993
Party	Seats	Gains	Losses	Net gain/loss	Seats %	Votes %	Votes	+/−
DUP	9	0	0	0	39.1	44.1	8,877	▼0.9
UUP	6	0	0	0	26.1	21.9	4,405	▼5.1
Alliance	5	1	0	▲1	21.7	21.9	4,412	▲0.4
Ind. Unionist	2	1	0	▲1	8.7	3.8	759	0.0
UPUP	1	0	0	0	4.3	2.8	557	▲0.3
NI Conservatives	0	0	0	0	0.0	5.5	1,104	New

Note: "Votes" are the first preference votes.

== Districts summary ==
Results of the Castlereagh Borough Council election, 1993 by district
Ward	%	Cllrs	%	Cllrs	%	Cllrs	%	Cllrs	%	Cllrs	Total Cllrs
Ward	DUP		UUP		Alliance		UPUP		Others		Total Cllrs
Castlereagh Central	57.4	3	15.1	1	18.6	1	0.0	0	8.9	1	6
Castlereagh East	52.0	3	8.9	1	15.3	1	9.3	1	14.5	1	7
Castlereagh South	30.5	1	31.0	2	31.1	2	0.0	0	7.4	0	5
Castlereagh West	31.8	2	37.9	2	25.6	1	0.0	0	4.7	0	5
Total	44.1	9	21.9	6	21.9	5	2.8	1	9.3	2	23

== Districts results ==
=== Castlereagh Central ===
1993: 3 x DUP, 1 x Alliance, 1 x UUP, 1 x Independent Unionist

Castlereagh Central - 6 seats
Party	Candidate	FPv%	Count								
Party	Candidate	FPv%	1	2	3	4	5	6	7	8	9
DUP	Peter Robinson*	53.27%	2,775								
Alliance	Patrick Mitchell*	15.01%	782								
UUP	Alan Carson*	12.57%	655	802							
DUP	John Norris	0.90%	47	770.75							
DUP	Cecil Moore	2.17%	113	689	695	707.8	708	723.74	737.31	746.31	
Ind. Unionist	Grant Dillon*	6.53%	340	450.25	452.75	471.31	471.83	472.63	505.81	570.92	645.92
DUP	Mary Fairfield	1.06%	55	417.25	423	431.32	431.48	433.5	442.41	469	493
Alliance	Ann Smith	3.55%	185	209.75	214.5	216.1	245.22	245.34	292.08	320.1	
UUP	Ellen Gray*	1.98%	103	142	164	174.24	174.6	174.84	206.33		
NI Conservatives	Leeburn Stitt	2.42%	126	144.75	146.75	151.23	151.75	151.81			
UUP	John Ferris	0.54%	28	46							
Electorate: 11,260 Valid: 5,209 (46.26%) Spoilt: 202 Quota: 745 Turnout: 5,411 (48.06%)

=== Castlereagh East ===
1993: 3 x DUP, 1 x Alliance, 1 x UUP, 1 x UPUP, 1 x Independent Unionist

Castlereagh East - 7 seats
Party	Candidate	FPv%	Count							
Party	Candidate	FPv%	1	2	3	4	5	6	7	8
DUP	Iris Robinson*	45.13%	2,690							
Alliance	Peter Osborne	15.27%	910							
DUP	Matthew Anderson*	3.89%	232	1,364.94						
DUP	Sandy Geddis	1.44%	86	298.38	831.58					
UPUP	Tommy Jeffers*	9.34%	557	676.88	688.88	732.66	736.36			
UUP	John Bell*	8.00%	477	531.02	539.02	563.44	607.76	608.36	632.44	723.44
Ind. Unionist	William Abraham*	7.03%	419	493.74	502.14	523.48	532.1	532.88	547.56	624.02
NI Conservatives	David Munster	3.88%	231	262.08	264.48	294.18	295.18	295.48	496.52	520.6
DUP	Will Kelly	1.54%	92	362.1	395.3	399.48	409.52	484.1	491.2	
NI Conservatives	Barbara Finney	3.52%	210	231.46	235.06	266.3	267.52	267.88		
UUP	John Boyle*	0.95%	57	76.98	81.38	89.74				
Electorate: 15,253 Valid: 5,961 (39.08%) Spoilt: 125 Quota: 746 Turnout: 6,086 (39.90%)

=== Castlereagh South ===
1993: 2 x Alliance, 2 x UUP, 1 x DUP

Castlereagh South - 5 seats
Party	Candidate	FPv%	Count					
Party	Candidate	FPv%	1	2	3	4	5	6
UUP	John Beattie	22.75%	1,003					
DUP	Myreve Chambers*	22.14%	976					
Alliance	Geraldine Rice*	18.94%	835					
Alliance	Margaret Marshall	12.18%	537	543.48	553.48	557.73	654.1	749.5
UUP	Marie Luney	8.23%	363	585.48	586.48	601.73	726.95	728.15
DUP	Charlie Tosh	8.35%	368	379.88	380.88	592.88	625.54	626.62
NI Conservatives	Michael Henderson	6.37%	281	299.09	329.36	335.61		
NI Conservatives	Joyce Young	1.04%	46	46.81				
Electorate: 10,556 Valid: 4,409 (41.77%) Spoilt: 118 Quota: 735 Turnout: 4,527 (42.89%)

=== Castlereagh West ===
1993: 2 x UUP, 2 x DUP, 1 x Alliance

Castlereagh West - 5 seats
Party	Candidate	FPv%	Count					
Party	Candidate	FPv%	1	2	3	4	5	6
UUP	John Taylor*	34.16%	1,549					
DUP	Ernest Harper*	21.81%	989					
Alliance	David Andrews	20.40%	925					
UUP	William Stevenson	3.75%	170	781				
DUP	William Clulow	8.05%	365	434.16	493.68	496.2	518.84	796.44
Alliance	Sara Duncan	5.25%	238	264	266.4	420.66	531.52	546.64
DUP	William Smyth	2.95%	89	139.96	309.16	310.42	349.78	
NI Conservatives	Andrew Fee	4.63%	210	232.36	232.84	237.34		
Electorate: 10,557 Valid: 4,535 (42.96%) Spoilt: 120 Quota: 756 Turnout: 4,655 (44.09%)
