= Castlereagh West (District Electoral Area) =

District electoral areas in Ards, Northern Ireland

Castlereagh West DEA (1993-2014) within Castlereagh

Castlereagh West was one of the four district electoral areas in Castlereagh, Northern Ireland which existed from 1993 to 2014. The district elected five members to Castlereagh Borough Council, and formed part of Belfast South constituencies for the Northern Ireland Assembly and UK Parliament.

It was created for the 1993 local elections, and contained the wards of Beechill, Galwally, Hillfoot, Minnowburn and Newtownbreda. It was abolished for the 2014 local elections and mostly transferred to the Castlereagh South DEA with Hillfoot moved to form part of the new Lisnasharragh DEA for the 2014 Belfast City Council election.

== Councillors ==
Election	Councillor (Party)	Councillor (Party)	Councillor (Party)	Councillor (Party)	Councillor (Party)
2011	Sara Duncan (Alliance)	Peter O'Reilly (SDLP)	Cecil Hall (UUP)	Ann-Marie Beattie (DUP)	Myreve Chambers (DUP)
2005	Sara Duncan (Alliance)	Rosaleen Hughes (SDLP)	Cecil Hall (UUP)	Ann-Marie Beattie (DUP)	Myreve Chambers (DUP)
2001	Sara Duncan (Alliance)	Rosaleen Hughes (SDLP)	Cecil Hall (UUP)	Mark Robinson (DUP)	Vivienne Stevenson (DUP)
1997	Sara Duncan (Alliance)	Rosaleen Hughes (SDLP)	Cecil Hall (UUP)	Mark Robinson (DUP)	William Clulow (DUP)
1993	David Andrews (Alliance)	John Taylor (UUP)	William Stevenson (UUP)	Ernest Harper (DUP)	William Clulow (DUP)

== 2011 Election ==
2005: 2 x DUP, 1 x Alliance, 1 x SDLP, 1 x UUP

2011: 2 x DUP, 1 x Alliance, 1 x SDLP, 1 x UUP

2005-2011 Change: No change

Castlereagh West - 5 seats
Party	Candidate	FPv%	Count				
Party	Candidate	FPv%	1	2	3	4	5
Alliance	Sara Duncan*	26.97%	1,456				
DUP	Ann-Marie Beattie*	21.08%	1,138				
SDLP	Peter O'Reilly	17.34%	936				
DUP	Myreve Chambers*	11.67%	630	726	948.6		
UUP	Cecil Hall*	11.13%	601	768.5	777.11	811.61	850.67
UUP	Bill White	4.98%	269	370.5	374.07	397.78	405.22
Sinn Féin	Laura Keenan	5.11%	276	340	340.21	386.71	387.13
People Before Profit	Gordon Hewitt	1.72%	93	215	215.21		
Electorate: 10,045 Valid: 5,399 (53.75%) Spoilt: 100 Quota: 900 Turnout: 5,499 (54.74%)

== 2005 Election ==
2001: 2 x DUP, 1 x Alliance, 1 x SDLP, 1 x UUP

2005: 2 x DUP, 1 x Alliance, 1 x SDLP, 1 x UUP

2001-2005 Change: No change

Castlereagh West - 5 seats
Party	Candidate	FPv%	Count					
Party	Candidate	FPv%	1	2	3	4	5	6
DUP	Ann-Marie Beattie	24.00%	1,417					
Alliance	Sara Duncan*	19.93%	1,177					
DUP	Myreve Chambers	10.09%	596	991.1				
UUP	Cecil Hall*	14.14%	835	847.6	917.3	1,039.3		
SDLP	Rosaleen Hughes*	13.45%	794	794.6	850.53	862.85	862.85	1,285.85
UUP	Bill White	6.42%	379	384.1	410.28	467.14	519.08	525.08
SDLP	Gary Vaugh	7.47%	441	441	458	467.19	468.78	
Independent	Cyril Kernaghan	4.50%	266	271.4	284.66			
Electorate: 9,805 Valid: 5,905 (60.22%) Spoilt: 145 Quota: 985 Turnout: 6,050 (61.70%)

== 2001 Election ==
1997: 2 x DUP, 1 x UUP, 1 x SDLP, 1 x Alliance

2001: 2 x DUP, 1 x UUP, 1 x SDLP, 1 x Alliance

1997-2001 Change: No change

Castlereagh West - 5 seats
Party	Candidate	FPv%	Count					
Party	Candidate	FPv%	1	2	3	4	5	6
DUP	Mark Robinson	27.20%	1,858					
UUP	Cecil Hall*	25.30%	1,728					
SDLP	Rosaleen Hughes*	17.51%	1,196					
Alliance	Sara Duncan*	16.54%	1,130	1,141.31				
DUP	Vivienne Stevenson	0.89%	61	603.88	840.76	841.6	1,075.37	1,276.18
NI Women's Coalition	Eileen Cairnduff	4.48%	306	311.85	463.47	570.89	577.96	672.08
PUP	Frederick Ferguson	4.41%	301	324.01	452.53	459.53	469	
DUP	Charles Tosh	1.35%	92	223.82	280.52	280.94		
Sinn Féin	Sean Montgomery	2.31%	158	158	162.62			
Electorate: 10,958 Valid: 6,830 (62.33%) Spoilt: 164 Quota: 1,139 Turnout: 6,994 (63.83%)

== 1997 Election ==
1993: 2 x UUP, 2 x DUP, 1 x Alliance

1997: 2 x DUP, 1 x UUP, 1 x Alliance, 1 x SDLP

1993-1997 Change: SDLP gain from UUP

Castlereagh West - 5 seats
Party	Candidate	FPv%	Count								
Party	Candidate	FPv%	1	2	3	4	5	6	7	8	9
DUP	William Clulow*	19.80%	952								
Alliance	Sara Duncan	14.49%	697	700.45	816.45						
DUP	Mark Robinson	12.62%	607	698.5	701.5	815.5					
UUP	Cecil Hall	15.47%	744	759.15	763.3	777.85	781.3	788.5	1,024.5		
SDLP	Rosaleen Hughes*	12.87%	619	619.3	625.3	626.45	631.85	631.85	631.85	637.85	659.6
PUP	Samuel Johnston	7.63%	367	371.8	373.8	378.15	380.4	382	404.9	448.9	651.25
Ind. Unionist	Ernest Harper*	5.55%	267	279.6	281.75	289.15	291.55	294.15	313.5	418.5	
UUP	Marie Luney	5.70%	274	276.25	277.25	284.3	285.2	287.2			
DUP	Thomas Scott	2.95%	142	153.4	153.4						
Alliance	Malcolm Gilmore	2.91%	140	140.3							
Electorate: 11,140 Valid: 4,809 (43.17%) Spoilt: 87 Quota: 802 Turnout: 4,896 (43.95%)

== 1993 Election ==
1993: 2 x UUP, 2 x DUP, 1 x Alliance

Castlereagh West - 5 seats
Party	Candidate	FPv%	Count					
Party	Candidate	FPv%	1	2	3	4	5	6
UUP	John Taylor*	34.16%	1,549					
DUP	Ernest Harper*	21.81%	989					
Alliance	David Andrews	20.40%	925					
UUP	William Stevenson	3.75%	170	781				
DUP	William Clulow	8.05%	365	434.16	493.68	496.2	518.84	796.44
Alliance	Sara Duncan	5.25%	238	264	266.4	420.66	531.52	546.64
DUP	William Smyth	2.95%	89	139.96	309.16	310.42	349.78	
NI Conservatives	Andrew Fee	4.63%	210	232.36	232.84	237.34		
Electorate: 10,557 Valid: 4,535 (42.96%) Spoilt: 120 Quota: 756 Turnout: 4,655 (44.09%)
