= 1985 Castlereagh Borough Council election =

Local government election in Northern Ireland

← 1981	15 May 1985	1989 →

All 21 seats to Castlereagh Borough Council 11 seats needed for a majority
	First party	Second party	Third party
Party	DUP	UUP	Alliance
Seats won	10	8	3
Seat change	▲1	▲3	▼1
	Fourth party
Party	Ind. Unionist
Seats won	0
Seat change	▼1

Elections to Castlereagh Borough Council were held on 15 May 1985 on the same day as the other Northern Irish local government elections. The election used three district electoral areas to elect a total of 21 councillors.

== Election results ==
Castlereagh Borough Council Election Result 1985
Party	Seats	Gains	Losses	Net gain/loss	Seats %	Votes %	Votes	+/−
DUP	10	1	0	▲1	47.6	48.0	11,039	▲3.2
UUP	8	3	0	▲3	38.1	29.0	6,676	▲3.8
Alliance	3	0	1	▼1	14.3	18.8	4,319	▼2.3
Ind. Unionist	0	0	1	▼1	0.0	1.6	373	▼3.4
SDLP	0	0	0	0	0.0	2.0	456	▲2.0
NI Labour	0	0	0	0	0.0	0.6	129	▼0.1

Note: "Votes" are the first preference votes.

== Districts summary ==
Results of the Castlereagh Borough Council election, 1985 by district
Ward	%	Cllrs	%	Cllrs	%	Cllrs	%	Cllrs	Total Cllrs
Ward	DUP		UUP		Alliance		Others		Total Cllrs
Castlereagh Central	58.2	4	19.6	2	20.5	1	1.7	0	7
Castlereagh East	46.2	3	31.9	3	18.1	1	3.8	0	7
Castlereagh South	40.1	3	35.5	3	17.7	1	6.7	0	7
Total	48.0	10	29.0	8	18.8	3	4.2	0	21

== District results ==
=== Castlereagh Central ===
1985: 4 x DUP, 2 x UUP, 1 x Alliance

Castlereagh Central - 7 seats
Party	Candidate	FPv%	Count						
Party	Candidate	FPv%	1	2	3	4	5	6	7
DUP	Peter Robinson*	52.69%	4,118						
DUP	Cedric Wilson*	0.92%	72	2,292.72					
UUP	Herbert Johnstone*	11.90%	930	1,076.68					
DUP	Alan Carson*	3.85%	301	683.28	1,651.23				
DUP	Ivan Castles	0.69%	54	211.32	413.82	1,068.22			
Alliance	Patricia Archer*	11.43%	893	921.88	958.78	962.62	968.56	983.56	
UUP	Ellen Gray*	7.73%	604	673.16	725.36	733.36	802	884.95	926.44
Alliance	Derek Middleton	5.40%	422	441	446.85	448.45	455.71	463.97	743.85
Alliance	William Moreland	3.69%	288	313.84	323.74	325.02	334.26	352.44	
Ind. Unionist	Cecil Moore	1.70%	133	189.24	213.54	218.02	225.94		
Electorate: 14,751 Valid: 7,815 (52.98%) Spoilt: 220 Quota: 977 Turnout: 8,035 (54.47%)

=== Castlereagh East ===
1985: 3 x DUP, 3 x UUP, 1 x Alliance

Castlereagh East - 7 seats
Party	Candidate	FPv%	Count								
Party	Candidate	FPv%	1	2	3	4	5	6	7	8	9
DUP	Denny Vitty*	34.06%	2,317								
UUP	William Ward*	16.96%	1,154								
DUP	John Boyle*	2.20%	150	1,105.71							
UUP	William Abraham	10.95%	745	778.39	875.11						
DUP	Matthew Anderson*	7.19%	489	652.8	674.64	894.96					
Alliance	Addie Morrow*	10.27%	699	710.97	728.65	729.45	729.6	730.14	761.03	862.03	
UUP	Ronald Jackson	3.97%	270	297.09	421.89	424.45	425.35	444.13	454.95	517.48	702.48
DUP	Albert Johnston	2.70%	184	414.58	432.52	448.68	487.23	488.37	501.11	574.3	606.3
Alliance	Melissa Jeffers	5.09%	346	351.67	352.97	353.29	353.35	353.47	382.73	474.38	
Alliance	Ian Kirkpatrick	2.84%	193	203.08	209.32	209.32	209.35	209.47	220.47		
Ind. Unionist	Michael Brooks	1.87%	127	140.86	146.84	147.64	148.03	148.69	154.95		
NI Labour	James Bate	0.85%	58	59.26	59.52	60	60.03	60.15			
NI Labour	William Gunning	0.65%	44	45.89	47.97	47.97	47.97	47.97			
NI Labour	William Copley	0.40%	27	27	27.78	27.78	27.84	27.9			
Electorate: 14,584 Valid: 6,803 (46.65%) Spoilt: 183 Quota: 851 Turnout: 6,986 (47.90%)

=== Castlereagh South ===
1985: 3 x DUP, 3 x UUP, 1 x Alliance

Castlereagh South - 7 seats
Party	Candidate	FPv%	Count							
Party	Candidate	FPv%	1	2	3	4	5	6	7	8
DUP	Ernest Harper*	16.35%	1,369							
DUP	William Clulow*	14.96%	1,253							
UUP	James Clarke	13.85%	1,160							
UUP	John Glass*	12.60%	1,055							
Alliance	David Andrews	11.85%	992	996.6	1,000.12	1,001.83	1,009.24	1,076.24		
UUP	Frederick Kane*	9.05%	758	769.73	786.53	876.89	902.04	912.72	1,017.04	1,068.04
DUP	Myreve Chambers	4.97%	416	653.59	692.79	697.74	727.07	728.76	736.86	1,056.39
SDLP	Peggy Hanna	5.45%	456	456	456.48	456.66	457.05	462.23	635.32	639.32
DUP	Mark Robinson	3.77%	316	371.2	491.2	494.53	535.63	537.95	545.27	
Alliance	Edward McMillan	3.56%	298	298.69	299.81	300.08	300.08	404.33		
Alliance	Ernest Crockett	2.25%	188	188.92	189.88	190.96	191.96			
Ind. Unionist	William Stevenson	1.35%	113	114.38	126.22	126.76				
Electorate: 15,485 Valid: 8,374 (54.08%) Spoilt: 161 Quota: 1,047 Turnout: 8,535 (55.12%)
