= 1997 Castlereagh Borough Council election =

Local government election in Northern Ireland

← 1993	21 May 1997	2001 →

All 23 seats to Castlereagh Borough Council 12 seats needed for a majority
	First party	Second party	Third party
Party	DUP	UUP	Alliance
Seats won	10	5	4
Seat change	▲1	▼1	▼1
	Fourth party	Fifth party	Sixth party
Party	SDLP	UK Unionist	Ind. Unionist
Seats won	2	1	1
Seat change	▲2	▲1	▼1
	Seventh party
Party	UPUP
Seats won	0
Seat change	▼1
- Results by district electoral area, shaded by First Preference Votes.

Elections to Castlereagh Borough Council were held on 21 May 1997 on the same day as the other Northern Irish local government elections. The election used four district electoral areas to elect a total of 23 councillors.

== Election results ==
Castlereagh Borough Council Election Result 1997
Party	Seats	Gains	Losses	Net gain/loss	Seats %	Votes %	Votes	+/−
DUP	10	1	0	▲1	43.5	44.2	9,214	▲0.1
UUP	5	0	1	▼1	21.7	19.6	4,088	▼2.3
Alliance	4	0	1	▼1	17.4	18.7	3,898	▼3.2
SDLP	2	0	0	▲2	8.7	8.2	1,707	▲8.2
Ind. Unionist	1	0	1	▼1	4.3	4.2	874	▲0.4
UK Unionist	1	1	0	▲1	4.3	1.3	267	New
PUP	0	0	0	0	0.0	1.8	367	▲1.9
Ulster Democratic	0	0	0	0	0.0	1.5	303	New
Independent	0	0	0	0	4.3	0.6	115	▲0.6

Note: "Votes" are the first preference votes.

== Districts summary ==
Results of the Castlereagh Borough Council election, 1997 by district
Ward	%	Cllrs	%	Cllrs	%	Cllrs	%	Cllrs	%	Cllrs	%	Cllrs	Total Cllrs
Ward	DUP		UUP		Alliance		SDLP		UKUP		Others		Total Cllrs
Castlereagh Central	58.7	3	17.0	1	14.6	1	4.4	0	5.3	1	0.0	0	6
Castlereagh East	53.0	4	11.1	1	18.9	1	0.0	0	0.0	0	17.0	1	7
Castlereagh South	27.4	1	31.2	2	23.9	1	17.5	1	0.0	0	0.0	0	5
Castlereagh West	35.4	2	21.2	1	17.4	1	12.9	1	0.0	0	13.1	0	5
Total	44.2	10	19.6	5	18.7	4	8.2	2	1.3	1	8.0	1	23

== Districts results ==
=== Castlereagh Central ===
1993: 4 x DUP, 1 x Alliance, 1 x UUP, 1 x Independent Unionist
1997: 4 x DUP, 1 x Alliance, 1 x UUP, 1 x UKUP
1993-1997 Change: Independent Unionist joins UKUP

Castlereagh Central - 6 seats
Party	Candidate	FPv%	Count					
Party	Candidate	FPv%	1	2	3	4	5	6
DUP	Peter Robinson*	55.30%	2,783					
UUP	Alan Carson*	16.97%	854					
DUP	John Norris*	1.21%	61	950.2				
Alliance	Patrick Mitchell*	11.92%	600	623.56	626.96	644.3	966.3	
DUP	John Dunn	1.73%	87	593.92	662.12	684.05	689.12	698.12
UK Unionist	Grant Dillon*	5.30%	267	516.28	528.28	591.69	609.59	684.59
DUP	Alwyn McClernon	0.46%	23	372.6	512.4	527.53	541.35	548.35
SDLP	Dominic Marsella	4.45%	224	225.52	225.52	225.69		
Alliance	Ann Smith	2.66%	134	161.36	162.76	171.94		
Electorate: 11,033 Valid: 5,033 (45.62%) Spoilt: 148 Quota: 720 Turnout: 5,181 (46.96%)

=== Castlereagh East ===
1993: 3 x DUP, 1 x Alliance, 1 x UUP, 1 x UPUP, 1 x Independent Unionist
1997: 4 x DUP, 1 x Alliance, 1 x UUP, 1 x Independent Unionist
1993-1997 Change: UPUP joins DUP

Castlereagh East - 7 seats
Party	Candidate	FPv%	Count					
Party	Candidate	FPv%	1	2	3	4	5	6
DUP	Iris Robinson*	46.08%	2,787					
DUP	Tommy Jeffers*	2.84%	172	799.52				
UUP	Sarah Cummings	11.11%	672	768.2				
Ind. Unionist	William Abraham*	10.04%	607	721.7	757.4			
DUP	Sandy Geddis*	2.65%	160	643.96	663.92	733.56	810.56	
Alliance	Peter Osborne*	11.19%	677	709.56	721.3	728.48	757.18	
DUP	Kim Morton	1.21%	73	400.82	411.56	555.72	624.32	663.32
Alliance	Michael Long	7.71%	466	486.72	504.2	505.68	539.12	545.12
Ulster Democratic	Stephen McNally	5.01%	303	365.16	387.12	401.44		
DUP	Sarah Seddon	0.26%	16	246.14	248.88			
Independent	David Brown	1.90%	115	130.54				
Electorate: 15,542 Valid: 6,048 (38.91%) Spoilt: 130 Quota: 757 Turnout: 6,178 (39.75%)

=== Castlereagh South ===
1993: 2 x UUP, 2 x Alliance, 1 x DUP
1997: 2 x UUP, 1 x Alliance, 1 x DUP, 1 x SDLP
1993-1997 Change: SDLP gain from Alliance

Castlereagh South - 5 seats
Party	Candidate	FPv%	Count					
Party	Candidate	FPv%	1	2	3	4	5	6
UUP	John Beattie*	24.66%	1,219					
DUP	Myreve Chambers*	23.18%	1,146					
SDLP	Arthur Hegney	17.48%	864					
UUP	Michael Henderson	6.57%	325	681.4	705.2	862.2		
Alliance	Geraldine Rice*	12.70%	628	634.27	639.31	675.55	697.4	714.45
Alliance	Margaret Marshall*	11.25%	556	564.91	569.67	647.48	664.53	685.43
DUP	Andrew Ramsey	4.95%	205	224.8	505.36			
Electorate: 11,873 Valid: 4,943 (41.63%) Spoilt: 67 Quota: 824 Turnout: 5,010 (42.20%)

=== Castlereagh West ===
1993: 2 x UUP, 2 x DUP, 1 x Alliance
1997: 2 x DUP, 1 x UUP, 1 x Alliance, 1 x SDLP
1993-1997 Change: SDLP gain from UUP

Castlereagh West - 5 seats
Party	Candidate	FPv%	Count								
Party	Candidate	FPv%	1	2	3	4	5	6	7	8	9
DUP	William Clulow*	19.80%	952								
Alliance	Sara Duncan	14.49%	697	700.45	816.45						
DUP	Mark Robinson	12.62%	607	698.5	701.5	815.5					
UUP	Cecil Hall	15.47%	744	759.15	763.3	777.85	781.3	788.5	1,024.5		
SDLP	Rosaleen Hughes*	12.87%	619	619.3	625.3	626.45	631.85	631.85	631.85	637.85	659.6
PUP	Samuel Johnston	7.63%	367	371.8	373.8	378.15	380.4	382	404.9	448.9	651.25
Ind. Unionist	Ernest Harper*	5.55%	267	279.6	281.75	289.15	291.55	294.15	313.5	418.5	
UUP	Marie Luney	5.70%	274	276.25	277.25	284.3	285.2	287.2			
DUP	Thomas Scott	2.95%	142	153.4	153.4						
Alliance	Malcolm Gilmore	2.91%	140	140.3							
Electorate: 11,140 Valid: 4,809 (43.17%) Spoilt: 87 Quota: 802 Turnout: 4,896 (43.95%)
