= 2011 Castlereagh Borough Council election =

Local government election in Northern Ireland

- 5 May 2011

All 23 seats to Castlereagh Borough Council 12 seats needed for a majority
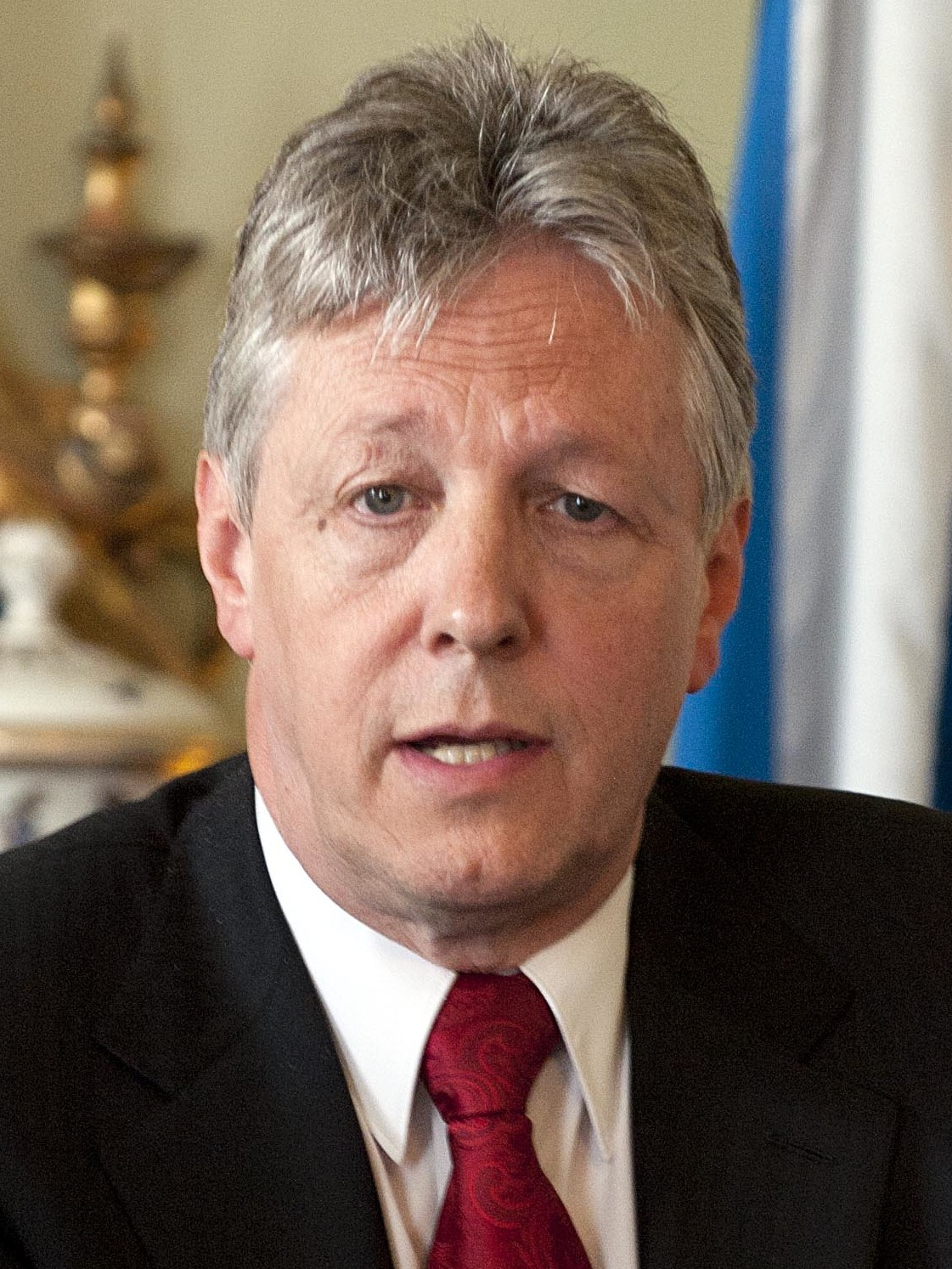

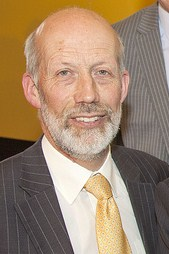

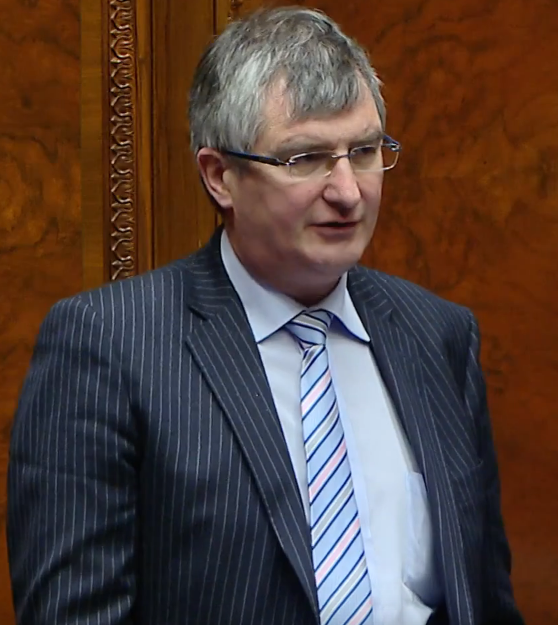

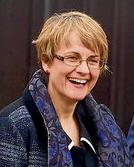

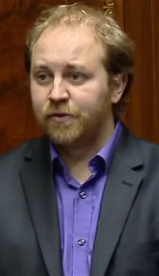
	First party	Second party	Third party
Leader	Peter Robinson	David Ford	Tom Elliott
Party	DUP	Alliance	UUP
Seats won	11	6	3
Seat change	▼2	▲2	▼1
Percentage	42.6%	25.2%	11.2%
Swing	▼3.9%	▲9.0%	▼6.6%
First preferences	10,390	6,142	2,717
	Fourth party	Fifth party
Leader	Margaret Ritchie	Steven Agnew
Party	SDLP	Green (NI)
Seats won	2	1
Seat change	Steady	▲1
Percentage	11.0%	2.9%
Swing	▼1.0%	▲2.9%
First preferences	2,681	716
- 2011 Castlereagh City Council Election Results, shaded by First Preference Votes.

Elections to Castlereagh Borough Council were held on 5 May 2011 on the same day as the other Northern Irish local government elections. The election used four district electoral areas to elect a total of 23 councillors.

== Election results ==
Castlereagh Borough Council Election Result 2011
Party	Seats	Gains	Losses	Net gain/loss	Seats %	Votes %	Votes	+/−
DUP	11	0	2	▼2	47.8	42.6	10,390	▼3.9
Alliance	6	2	0	▲2	26.1	25.2	6,142	▲9.0
UUP	3	0	1	▼1	13.0	11.2	2,717	▼6.6
SDLP	2	0	0	Steady	8.7	11.0	2,681	▼1.0
Green (NI)	1	1	0	▲1	4.3	2.9	716	▲2.9
Sinn Féin	0	0	0	Steady	0.0	3.0	735	▲1.5
PUP	0	0	0	Steady	0.0	1.3	323	▼0.8
TUV	0	0	0	Steady	0.0	1.0	245	New
BNP	0	0	0	Steady	0.0	0.8	205	New
NI Conservatives	0	0	0	Steady	0.0	0.5	120	▲0.5
People Before Profit	0	0	0	Steady	0.0	0.4	93	New

Note: "Votes" are the first preference votes.

== Districts summary ==
Results of the Castlereagh Borough Council election, 2011 by district
Ward	%	Cllrs	%	Cllrs	%	Cllrs	%	Cllrs	%	Cllrs	%	Cllrs	Total Cllrs
Ward	DUP		Alliance		UUP		SDLP		Green		Others		Total Cllrs
Castlereagh Central	41.4	3	28.8	2	12.9	1	5.7	0	0.0	0	11.2	0	6
Castlereagh East	56.0	4	26.3	2	5.6	1	0.0	0	7.7	1	4.4	0	7
Castlereagh South	36.5	2	19.6	1	12.0	1	22.6	0	0.0	0	9.3	0	5
Castlereagh West	32.7	2	27.0	1	16.1	1	17.3	1	0.0	0	6.9	0	5
Total	42.6	11	25.2	6	11.2	3	11.0	2	2.9	1	7.1	0	23

== Districts results ==
=== Castlereagh Central ===
2005: 4 x DUP, 1 x Alliance, 1 x UUP
2011: 3 x DUP, 2 x Alliance, 1 x UUP
2005-2011 Change: Alliance gain from DUP

Castlereagh Central - 6 seats
Party	Candidate	FPv%	Count							
Party	Candidate	FPv%	1	2	3	4	5	6	7	8
Alliance	Michael Long*	18.14%	919							
DUP	Vivienne McCoy	14.21%	720	727.35						
UUP	Michael Copeland*	12.91%	654	667.65	763.65					
Alliance	Carole Howard	10.64%	539	676.34	696.23	706.43	926.43			
DUP	Tommy Sandford	12.51%	634	639.46	675.88	688.12	692.75	700.75	943.75	
DUP	Denny Vitty	8.64%	438	439.47	453.47	457.55	457.55	457.55	508.37	723.97
PUP	Jason Burke	6.37%	323	326.36	353.36	362.2	369.67	394.67	401.67	405.59
DUP	Sharon Skillen	6.08%	308	310.31	324.31	328.39	329.81	329.81		
SDLP	Rosaleen Hughes	5.66%	287	300.23	303.44	303.44				
TUV	Alan Carson	4.84%	245	247.94						
Electorate: 9,341 Valid: 5,067 (54.24%) Spoilt: 104 Quota: 724 Turnout: 5,171 (55.36%)

=== Castlereagh East ===
2005: 5 x DUP, 1 x Alliance, 1 x UUP
2011: 4 x DUP, 2 x Alliance, 1 x Green
2005-2011 Change: Alliance and Green gain from DUP and UUP

Castlereagh East - 7 seats
Party	Candidate	FPv%	Count						
Party	Candidate	FPv%	1	2	3	4	5	6	7
DUP	Gareth Robinson*	24.25%	1,804						
Alliance	Judith Cochrane*	17.60%	1,309						
DUP	Jim White*	5.93%	441	939.5					
Alliance	Tim Morrow	8.74%	650	676	986.01				
DUP	Tommy Jeffers*	10.22%	760	920.5	928.62	962.62			
DUP	David Drysdale*	8.72%	649	720.5	730.07	780.02	786.18	796.18	900.04
Green (NI)	Martin Gregg	7.72%	574	599	620.46	684.99	713.34	716.34	870.15
DUP	Aileen Graham	6.86%	510	572	575.48	588.27	591.14	598.14	687
UUP	Hazel Legge	5.61%	417	433	444.6	553	565.04	570.04	
BNP	Ann Cooper	2.76%	205	216	219.19				
NI Conservatives	Terry Dick	1.61%	120	122.5	129.46				
Electorate: 14,291 Valid: 7,439 (52.05%) Spoilt: 118 Quota: 930 Turnout: 7,557 (52.88%)

=== Castlereagh South ===
2005: 2 x DUP, 1 x SDLP, 1 x Alliance, 1 x UUP
2011: 2 x DUP, 1 x SDLP, 1 x Alliance, 1 x UUP
2005-2011 Change: No change

Castlereagh South - 5 seats
Party	Candidate	FPv%	Count					
Party	Candidate	FPv%	1	2	3	4	5	6
DUP	James Spratt*	23.75%	1,535					
Alliance	Geraldine Rice*	19.64%	1,269					
DUP	John Beattie*	12.74%	823	1,229.8				
SDLP	Brian Hanvey*	14.67%	948	949.8	993.49	996.37	1,041.66	1,289.66
UUP	Michael Henderson*	9.15%	591	610.8	648.54	748.22	1,022.29	1,024.92
SDLP	Sean Mullan	7.89%	510	513	542.58	543.22	584.68	759.44
Sinn Féin	James Irwin	7.10%	459	460.5	464.75	464.91	478.94	
UUP	Barbara McBurney	2.86%	185	201.5	229.89	268.93		
Green (NI)	Rebecca Volley	2.20%	142	143.8	190.04	195.8		
Electorate: 12,061 Valid: 6,462 (53.58%) Spoilt: 90 Quota: 1,078 Turnout: 6,552 (54.32%)

=== Castlereagh West ===
2005: 2 x DUP, 1 x Alliance, 1 x SDLP, 1 x UUP
2011: 2 x DUP, 1 x Alliance, 1 x SDLP, 1 x UUP
2005-2011 Change: No change

Castlereagh West - 5 seats
Party	Candidate	FPv%	Count				
Party	Candidate	FPv%	1	2	3	4	5
Alliance	Sara Duncan*	26.97%	1,456				
DUP	Ann-Marie Beattie*	21.08%	1,138				
SDLP	Peter O'Reilly	17.34%	936				
DUP	Myreve Chambers*	11.67%	630	726	948.6		
UUP	Cecil Hall*	11.13%	601	768.5	777.11	811.61	850.67
UUP	Bill White	4.98%	269	370.5	374.07	397.78	405.22
Sinn Féin	Laura Keenan	5.11%	276	340	340.21	386.71	387.13
People Before Profit	Gordon Hewitt	1.72%	93	215	215.21		
Electorate: 10,045 Valid: 5,399 (53.75%) Spoilt: 100 Quota: 900 Turnout: 5,499 (54.74%)
