= Castlereagh East (District Electoral Area) =

Electoral area in Northern Ireland

- Lisburn and Castlereagh City Council DEA constituency

Current constituency
- Created: 1985
- Seats: 7 (1985-2014); 6 (2014-)
- Councillors: Samantha Burns (DUP); Martin Gregg (APNI); John Laverty (DUP); Hazel Legge (UUP); Sharon Lowry (APNI); Sharon Skillen (DUP)

Castlereagh East DEA within Lisburn and Castlereagh

Castlereagh East DEA (1993-2014) within Castlereagh

Castlereagh East is one of the seven district electoral areas (DEA) in Lisburn and Castlereagh, Northern Ireland. The district elects five members to Lisburn and Castlereagh City Council and contains the wards of Ballyhanwood, Carrowreagh, Dundonald, Enler, Graham's Bridge and Moneyreagh. Castlereagh East forms part of the Belfast East constituencies for the Northern Ireland Assembly and UK Parliament.

It was created for the 1985 local elections, replacing Castlereagh Area B which had existed since 1973, where it contained seven wards (Ballyhanwood, Carrowreagh, Dundonald, Enler, Gilnahirk, Graham's Bridge and Tullycarnet). For the 2014 local elections, it was decreased to six wards. The Gilnahirk and Tullycarnet areas were transferred to Belfast City Council, while Moneyreagh was gained from Castlereagh South.

== Councillors ==
Election	Councillor (Party)	Councillor (Party)	Councillor (Party)	Councillor (Party)	Councillor (Party)	Councillor (Party)	Councillor (Party)
2023	Sharon Lowry (Alliance)	Martin Gregg (Alliance)	Hazel Legge (UUP)	Sharon Skillen (DUP)	John Laverty (DUP)	Samantha Burns (DUP)	6 seats 2014–present
January 2020 Co-Option	Sharon Lowry (Alliance)	Martin Gregg (Alliance)	Hazel Legge (UUP)	Sharon Skillen (DUP)	John Laverty (DUP)	David Drysdale (DUP)/ (UUP)	6 seats 2014–present
2019	Tim Morrow (Alliance)	Martin Gregg (Alliance)	Hazel Legge (UUP)	Sharon Skillen (DUP)	Tommy Jeffers (DUP)	David Drysdale (DUP)/ (UUP)	6 seats 2014–present
2014	Tim Morrow (Alliance)	Andrew Girvin (TUV)	Hazel Legge (UUP)	Sharon Skillen (DUP)	Tommy Jeffers (DUP)	David Drysdale (DUP)/ (UUP)	6 seats 2014–present
2011	Tim Morrow (Alliance)	Judith Cochrane (Alliance)	Martin Gregg (Green Party)	Gareth Robinson (DUP)	Tommy Jeffers (DUP)	David Drysdale (DUP)/ (UUP)	Jim White (DUP)
2005	Iris Robinson (DUP)	Judith Cochrane (Alliance)	Charlie Tosh (DUP)	Gareth Robinson (DUP)	Tommy Jeffers (DUP)	David Drysdale (DUP)/ (UUP)	Jim White (DUP)
2001	Iris Robinson (DUP)	Peter Osborne (Alliance)	Kim Morton (DUP)	Claire Ennis (DUP)	Francis Gallagher (Independent)	David Drysdale (DUP)/ (UUP)	Jim White (DUP)
1997	Iris Robinson (DUP)	Peter Osborne (Alliance)	Kim Morton (DUP)	Tommy Jeffers (DUP)/ (UPUP)	William Abraham (UUP)/ (Independent Unionist)	Sarah Cummings (UUP)	Sandy Geddis (DUP)
1993	Iris Robinson (DUP)	Peter Osborne (Alliance)	Matthew Anderson (DUP)	Tommy Jeffers (DUP)/ (UPUP)	William Abraham (UUP)/ (Independent Unionist)	John Bell (UUP)	Sandy Geddis (DUP)
1989	Iris Robinson (DUP)	William Boyd (Alliance)	Matthew Anderson (DUP)	Tommy Jeffers (DUP)/ (UPUP)	William Abraham (UUP)/ (Independent Unionist)	John Bell (UUP)	John Boyle (DUP)
1985	Denny Vitty (DUP)	Addie Morrow (Alliance)	Matthew Anderson (DUP)	William Ward (UUP)	William Abraham (UUP)/ (Independent Unionist)	Ronald Jackson (UUP)	John Boyle (DUP)

== 2023 Election ==
2019: 3 x DUP, 2 x Alliance, 1 x UUP

2023: 3 x DUP, 2 x Alliance, 1 x UUP

2019–2023 Change: No change

Castlereagh East - 6 seats
Party	Candidate	FPv%	Count				
Party	Candidate	FPv%	1	2	3	4	5
DUP	Sharon Skillen*	21.04%	1,655				
Alliance	Martin Gregg*	17.50%	1,377				
DUP	Samantha Burns	11.17%	879	1,165.72			
Alliance	Sharon Lowry*	13.28%	1,045	1,057.16	1,192.16		
DUP	John Laverty*	11.31%	890	960.72	966.68	980.62	1,130.62
UUP	Hazel Legge*	9.03%	710	735.28	763.92	959.08	1,086.60
DUP	David Drysdale*	7.40%	582	678	682.96	703.70	931.76
TUV	Andrew Girvin	6.79%	534	558.32	566.64	589.76	
Green (NI)	Terry Winchcombe	2.49%	195	199.48			
Electorate: 16,289 Valid: 7,867 (48.30%) Spoilt: 90 Quota: 1,124 Turnout: 7,957 (48.85%)

== 2019 Election ==
2014: 3 x DUP, 1 x Alliance, 1 x UUP, 1 x TUV
2019: 3 x DUP, 2 x Alliance, 1 x UUP
2014-2019 Change: Alliance gain from TUV

Castlereagh East - 6 seats
Party	Candidate	FPv%	Count				
Party	Candidate	FPv%	1	2	3	4	5
Alliance	Martin Gregg	17.36%	1,212				
DUP	Sharon Skillen*	16.81%	1,174				
Alliance	Tim Morrow* †	13.41%	936	1,128.78			
DUP	David Drysdale*	12.16%	849	850.19	951.14	956.92	1,081.92
UUP	Hazel Legge*	10.36%	723	728.1	736.65	808.9	1,040.9
DUP	John Laverty	11.64%	813	814.19	847.04	851.8	976.8
DUP	Tommy Jeffers*	9.14%	638	640.72	666.67	672.79	768.79
TUV	Andrew Girvin*	9.12%	637	637.85	644.15	656.39	
Electorate: 14,963 Valid: 6,982 (46.66%) Spoilt: 65 Quota: 998 Turnout: 7,047 (47.10%)

== 2014 Election ==
This election was carried out under new ward boundaries, as a result of local government reform.

2011: 4 x DUP, 2 x Alliance, 1 x Green

2014: 3 x DUP, 1 x Alliance, 1 x TUV, 1 x UUP

2011-2014 Change: TUV and UUP gain from DUP, Alliance and Green and due to the loss of one seat

Castlereagh East - 6 seats
Party	Candidate	FPv%	Count							
Party	Candidate	FPv%	1	2	3	4	5	6	7	8
DUP	Tommy Jeffers*	13.37%	881	886	897	903	978			
Alliance	Tim Morrow*	7.91%	521	537	566	836	852	1,065		
DUP	David Drysdale*	12.49%	823	834	849	858	923	961		
TUV	Andrew Girvin	10.37%	683	702	711	716	853	897	908	1,159
DUP	Sharon Skillen*	11.95%	787	792	798	801	855	891	903	1,155
UUP	Hazel Legge	8.81%	580	608	634	645	733	837	880	1,131
DUP	Lynda Spratt	10.63%	700	717	724	726	737	747	754	
Green (NI)	Martin Gregg*	6.71%	442	450	492	537	579			
PUP	Izzy Giles	7.47%	492	496	506	516				
Alliance	Stephen Donnan	4.57%	301	306	369					
NI21	Mark Devenney	3.66%	241	247						
Independent	Robert Campbell	1.14%	75							
Independent	Sandra Wilson	0.93%	61							
Electorate: 13,645 Valid: 6,587 (48.27%) Spoilt: 103 Quota: 942 Turnout: 6,690 (49.03%)

== 2011 Election ==
2005: 5 x DUP, 1 x Alliance, 1 x UUP

2011: 4 x DUP, 2 x Alliance, 1 x Green

2005-2011 Change: Alliance and Green gain from DUP and UUP

Castlereagh East - 7 seats
Party	Candidate	FPv%	Count						
Party	Candidate	FPv%	1	2	3	4	5	6	7
DUP	Gareth Robinson*	24.25%	1,804						
Alliance	Judith Cochrane*	17.60%	1,309						
DUP	Jim White*	5.93%	441	939.5					
Alliance	Tim Morrow	8.74%	650	676	986.01				
DUP	Tommy Jeffers*	10.22%	760	920.5	928.62	962.62			
DUP	David Drysdale*	8.72%	649	720.5	730.07	780.02	786.18	796.18	900.04
Green (NI)	Martin Gregg	7.72%	574	599	620.46	684.99	713.34	716.34	870.15
DUP	Aileen Graham	6.86%	510	572	575.48	588.27	591.14	598.14	687
UUP	Hazel Legge	5.61%	417	433	444.6	553	565.04	570.04	
BNP	Ann Cooper	2.76%	205	216	219.19				
NI Conservatives	Terry Dick	1.61%	120	122.5	129.46				
Electorate: 14,291 Valid: 7,439 (52.05%) Spoilt: 118 Quota: 930 Turnout: 7,557 (52.88%)

== 2005 Election ==
2001: 4 x DUP, 1 x UUP, 1 x Alliance, 1 x Independent

2005: 5 x DUP, 1 x UUP, 1 x Alliance

2001-2005 Change: DUP gain from Independent

Castlereagh East - 7 seats
Party	Candidate	FPv%	Count					
Party	Candidate	FPv%	1	2	3	4	5	6
DUP	Iris Robinson*	27.08%	2,090					
Alliance	Judith Cochrane	12.40%	957	977.9				
DUP	Gareth Robinson*	10.08%	778	1,251				
DUP	Tommy Jeffers	11.10%	857	1,033				
UUP	David Drysdale*	8.01%	618	648.25	657	844.05	847.41	951.17
DUP	Jim White*	5.40%	417	668.35	761.1	786	811.2	891.76
DUP	Charlie Tosh	5.52%	426	520.05	671.6	698.5	728.02	861.08
UUP	Mervyn Bailie	7.51%	580	597.05	602.3	719.85	722.49	805.28
Independent	Francis Gallagher*	7.14%	551	579.05	590.6	665.65	670.69	
UUP	Hazel Legge	3.41%	263	287.2	294.2			
PUP	Colin Neill	2.35%	181	190.35	195.6			
Electorate: 13,902 Valid: 7,718 (55.52%) Spoilt: 179 Quota: 965 Turnout: 7,897 (56.80%)

== 2001 Election ==
1997: 4 x DUP, 1 x UUP, 1 x Alliance, 1 x Independent Unionist

2001: 4 x DUP, 1 x UUP, 1 x Alliance, 1 x Independent

1997-2001 Change: Independent gain from Independent Unionist

Castlereagh East - 7 seats
Party	Candidate	FPv%	Count						
Party	Candidate	FPv%	1	2	3	4	5	6	7
DUP	Iris Robinson*	44.69%	4,093						
UUP	David Drysdale	20.52%	1,879						
Alliance	Peter Osborne*	10.08%	923	1,018.25	1,165.21				
DUP	Jim White	0.95%	87	1,044.75	1,098.87	1,140.08	1,169.08		
DUP	Kim Morton*	1.31%	120	690.75	727.71	768.85	1,078.22	1,091.66	1,197.58
DUP	Claire Ennis	2.23%	204	751.5	803.42	847.76	1,035.54	1,043.22	1,113.07
Independent	Francis Gallagher	7.10%	650	755	806.04	871.94	885.01	885.97	1,082.17
Alliance	Gillian Graham	4.37%	400	439.75	626.75	695.33	711.28	712.24	840.05
PUP	Richard Johnston	5.09%	466	538	626.88	669.32	690.22	691.18	
DUP	Sandy Geddis*	1.00%	92	569	601.12	632.7			
Independent	William Abraham*	2.67%	245	310.25	388.57				
Electorate: 15,245 Valid: 9,159 (60.08%) Spoilt: 249 Quota: 1,145 Turnout: 9,408 (61.71%)

== 1997 Election ==
1993: 3 x DUP, 1 x Alliance, 1 x UUP, 1 x UPUP, 1 x Independent Unionist

1997: 4 x DUP, 1 x Alliance, 1 x UUP, 1 x Independent Unionist

1993-1997 Change: UPUP joins DUP

Castlereagh East - 7 seats
Party	Candidate	FPv%	Count					
Party	Candidate	FPv%	1	2	3	4	5	6
DUP	Iris Robinson*	46.08%	2,787					
DUP	Tommy Jeffers*	2.84%	172	799.52				
UUP	Sarah Cummings	11.11%	672	768.2				
Ind. Unionist	William Abraham*	10.04%	607	721.7	757.4			
DUP	Sandy Geddis*	2.65%	160	643.96	663.92	733.56	810.56	
Alliance	Peter Osborne*	11.19%	677	709.56	721.3	728.48	757.18	
DUP	Kim Morton	1.21%	73	400.82	411.56	555.72	624.32	663.32
Alliance	Michael Long	7.71%	466	486.72	504.2	505.68	539.12	545.12
Ulster Democratic	Stephen McNally	5.01%	303	365.16	387.12	401.44		
DUP	Sarah Seddon	0.26%	16	246.14	248.88			
Independent	David Brown	1.90%	115	130.54				
Electorate: 15,542 Valid: 6,048 (38.91%) Spoilt: 130 Quota: 757 Turnout: 6,178 (39.75%)

== 1993 Election ==
1989: 3 x DUP, 1 x Alliance, 1 x UUP, 1 x UPUP, 1 x Independent Unionist

1993: 3 x DUP, 1 x Alliance, 1 x UUP, 1 x UPUP, 1 x Independent Unionist

1989-1993: No change

Castlereagh East - 7 seats
Party	Candidate	FPv%	Count							
Party	Candidate	FPv%	1	2	3	4	5	6	7	8
DUP	Iris Robinson*	45.13%	2,690							
Alliance	Peter Osborne	15.27%	910							
DUP	Matthew Anderson*	3.89%	232	1,364.94						
DUP	Sandy Geddis	1.44%	86	298.38	831.58					
UPUP	Tommy Jeffers*	9.34%	557	676.88	688.88	732.66	736.36			
UUP	John Bell*	8.00%	477	531.02	539.02	563.44	607.76	608.36	632.44	723.44
Ind. Unionist	William Abraham*	7.03%	419	493.74	502.14	523.48	532.1	532.88	547.56	624.02
NI Conservatives	David Munster	3.88%	231	262.08	264.48	294.18	295.18	295.48	496.52	520.6
DUP	Will Kelly	1.54%	92	362.1	395.3	399.48	409.52	484.1	491.2	
NI Conservatives	Barbara Finney	3.52%	210	231.46	235.06	266.3	267.52	267.88		
UUP	John Boyle*	0.95%	57	76.98	81.38	89.74				
Electorate: 15,253 Valid: 5,961 (39.08%) Spoilt: 125 Quota: 746 Turnout: 6,086 (39.90%)

== 1989 Election ==
1985: 3 x DUP, 3 x UUP, 1 x Alliance

1989: 3 x DUP, 1 x Alliance, 1 x UUP, 1 x UPUP, 1 x Independent Unionist

1985-1989 Change: UPUP and Independent Unionist gain from UUP (two seats)

Castlereagh East - 7 seats
Party	Candidate	FPv%	Count								
Party	Candidate	FPv%	1	2	3	4	5	6	7	8	9
DUP	Iris Robinson	21.05%	1,168								
DUP	Matthew Anderson*	16.91%	938								
Ind. Unionist	William Abraham*	13.63%	756								
Alliance	William Boyd	13.50%	749								
UUP	John Bell	9.03%	501	522.32	535.58	538.1	563.86	626.15	643.75	868.75	
UPUP	Tommy Jeffers	9.17%	509	530.73	537.23	539.64	552.04	643.35	663.7	695.7	
DUP	John Boyle*	3.53%	196	344.42	527.46	532.76	539.24	548.66	550.86	592.4	650.4
DUP	Mark Robinson	2.20%	122	371.28	402.22	407.04	410.88	421.71	424.24	457.28	492.28
UUP	Alexander Murray	5.62%	312	332.91	335.77	347.03	353.27	384.43	393.12		
Alliance	Muriel Wilkes	4.63%	257	263.56	265.64	272.64	274.4				
Ind. Unionist	Michael Brooks	0.72%	40	41.23	43.83						
Electorate: 14,754 Valid: 5,548 (37.60%) Spoilt: 155 Quota: 694 Turnout: 5,703 (38.65%)

== 1985 Election ==
1985: 3 x DUP, 3 x UUP, 1 x Alliance

Castlereagh East - 7 seats
Party	Candidate	FPv%	Count								
Party	Candidate	FPv%	1	2	3	4	5	6	7	8	9
DUP	Denny Vitty*	34.06%	2,317								
UUP	William Ward*	16.96%	1,154								
DUP	John Boyle*	2.20%	150	1,105.71							
UUP	William Abraham	10.95%	745	778.39	875.11						
DUP	Matthew Anderson*	7.19%	489	652.8	674.64	894.96					
Alliance	Addie Morrow*	10.27%	699	710.97	728.65	729.45	729.6	730.14	761.03	862.03	
UUP	Ronald Jackson	3.97%	270	297.09	421.89	424.45	425.35	444.13	454.95	517.48	702.48
DUP	Albert Johnston	2.70%	184	414.58	432.52	448.68	487.23	488.37	501.11	574.3	606.3
Alliance	Melissa Jeffers	5.09%	346	351.67	352.97	353.29	353.35	353.47	382.73	474.38	
Alliance	Ian Kirkpatrick	2.84%	193	203.08	209.32	209.32	209.35	209.47	220.47		
Ind. Unionist	Michael Brooks	1.87%	127	140.86	146.84	147.64	148.03	148.69	154.95		
NI Labour	James Bate	0.85%	58	59.26	59.52	60	60.03	60.15			
NI Labour	William Gunning	0.65%	44	45.89	47.97	47.97	47.97	47.97			
NI Labour	William Copley	0.40%	27	27	27.78	27.78	27.84	27.9			
Electorate: 14,584 Valid: 6,803 (46.65%) Spoilt: 183 Quota: 851 Turnout: 6,986 (47.90%)
