= Castlereagh Central (District Electoral Area) =

District electoral areas in Ards, Northern Ireland

Castlereagh Central DEA (1993-2014) within Castlereagh

Castlereagh Central was one of the district electoral areas in Castlereagh, Northern Ireland which existed from 1985 to 2014. It was one of three Castlereagh DEAs until 1993, and one of four until 2014. The district elected seven members to Castlereagh Borough Council from 1985 to 1993, and six members from 1993 to 2014. It formed part of the Strangford constituency until 1997, the Strangford and Belfast East constituencies from 1997 to 2010 and the Belfast East and Belfast South constituencies for the Northern Ireland Assembly and UK Parliament.

It was created for the 1985 local elections, replacing Castlereagh Area C which had existed since 1973, and contained the wards of Cregagh, Downshire, Hillfoot, Lisnasharragh, Lower Braniel, Upper Braniel and Wynchurch. For the 1993 local elections, it was reduced by one ward as Hillfoot was transferred to the new Castlereagh West District Electoral Area. It was abolished for the 2014 local elections and most of the area was transferred to Belfast City Council for the 2014 Belfast City Council election to form part of the new Lisnasharragh DEA.

== Councillors ==
Election	Councillor (Party)	Councillor (Party)	Councillor (Party)	Councillor (Party)	Councillor (Party)	Councillor (Party)	Councillor (Party)
2011	Michael Long (Alliance)	Carole Howard (Alliance)	Michael Copeland (UUP)	Denny Vitty (DUP)	Tommy Sandford (DUP)	Vivienne McCoy (DUP)	6 seats 1993–2014
2005	Michael Long (Alliance)	Peter Robinson (DUP)	Michael Copeland (UUP)	Joanne Bunting (DUP)	John Norris (DUP)	Andrew Ramsey (DUP)	6 seats 1993–2014
2001	Michael Long (Alliance)	Peter Robinson (DUP)	Michael Copeland (UUP)	Joanne Bunting (DUP)	John Norris (DUP)	Tommy Sandford (PUP)	6 seats 1993–2014
1997	Patrick Mitchell (Alliance)	Peter Robinson (DUP)	Alan Carson (UUP)/ (DUP)	John Dunn (DUP)	John Norris (DUP)	Grant Dillon (UKUP)/ (Independent Unionist)/ (UUP)	6 seats 1993–2014
1993	Patrick Mitchell (Alliance)	Peter Robinson (DUP)	Alan Carson (UUP)/ (DUP)	Cecil Moore (DUP)	John Norris (DUP)	Grant Dillon (UKUP)/ (Independent Unionist)/ (UUP)	6 seats 1993–2014
1989	Patrick Mitchell (Alliance)	Peter Robinson (DUP)	Alan Carson (UUP)/ (DUP)	Joyce Boyd (DUP)	Paul McNaughten (DUP)	Grant Dillon (UKUP)/ (Independent Unionist)/ (UUP)	Ellen Gray (UUP)
1985	Patricia Archer (Alliance)	Peter Robinson (DUP)	Alan Carson (UUP)/ (DUP)	Cedric Wilson (DUP)	Ivan Castles (DUP)	Herbert Johnstone (UUP)	Ellen Gray (UUP)

== 2011 Election ==
2005: 4 x DUP, 1 x Alliance, 1 x UUP

2011: 3 x DUP, 2 x Alliance, 1 x UUP

2005-2011 Change: Alliance gain from DUP

Castlereagh Central - 6 seats
Party	Candidate	FPv%	Count							
Party	Candidate	FPv%	1	2	3	4	5	6	7	8
Alliance	Michael Long*	18.14%	919							
DUP	Vivienne McCoy	14.21%	720	727.35						
UUP	Michael Copeland*	12.91%	654	667.65	763.65					
Alliance	Carole Howard	10.64%	539	676.34	696.23	706.43	926.43			
DUP	Tommy Sandford	12.51%	634	639.46	675.88	688.12	692.75	700.75	943.75	
DUP	Denny Vitty	8.64%	438	439.47	453.47	457.55	457.55	457.55	508.37	723.97
PUP	Jason Burke	6.37%	323	326.36	353.36	362.2	369.67	394.67	401.67	405.59
DUP	Sharon Skillen	6.08%	308	310.31	324.31	328.39	329.81	329.81		
SDLP	Rosaleen Hughes	5.66%	287	300.23	303.44	303.44				
TUV	Alan Carson	4.84%	245	247.94						
Electorate: 9,341 Valid: 5,067 (54.24%) Spoilt: 104 Quota: 724 Turnout: 5,171 (55.36%)

== 2005 Election ==
2001: 3 x DUP, 1 x Alliance, 1 x UUP, 1 x PUP

2005: 4 x DUP, 1 x Alliance, 1 x UUP

2001-2005 Change: DUP gain from PUP

Castlereagh Central - 6 seats
Party	Candidate	FPv%	Count						
Party	Candidate	FPv%	1	2	3	4	5	6	7
DUP	Peter Robinson*	25.81%	1,431						
Alliance	Michael Long*	16.32%	905						
DUP	Joanne Bunting*	16.14%	895						
UUP	Michael Copeland*	9.76%	541	582.86	608.21	611.62	727.3	796.3	
DUP	John Norris*	7.59%	421	663.42	669.27	699.08	710.82	790.83	800.83
DUP	Andrew Ramsey	4.91%	272	523.16	527.97	583.85	588.42	614.39	621.65
PUP	Tommy Sandford*	6.42%	356	391.88	399.03	401.34	403.99	436.39	491.01
SDLP	Sean Mullan	6.55%	363	363.92	397.72	397.94	407.8	429.9	
Independent	Alan Carson	3.77%	209	254.08	269.55	274.72	295.81		
UUP	Alan Martin	2.74%	152	165.8	181.01	181.89			
Electorate: 9,735 Valid: 5,545 (56.96%) Spoilt: 155 Quota: 793 Turnout: 5,700 (58.55%)

== 2001 Election ==
1997: 4 x DUP, 1 x Alliance, 1 x UUP, 1 x UKUP

2001: 4 x DUP, 1 x Alliance, 1 x UUP, 1 x PUP

1997-2001 Change: PUP gain from UKUP

Castlereagh Central - 6 seats
Party	Candidate	FPv%	Count							
Party	Candidate	FPv%	1	2	3	4	5	6	7	8
DUP	Peter Robinson*	42.40%	2,841							
UUP	Michael Copeland	15.40%	1,032							
DUP	John Norris*	2.40%	161	949.8	976.8					
Alliance	Michael Long	11.48%	769	798.82	879.68	904.16	1,274.16			
DUP	Joanne Bunting	4.51%	302	737.2	772.52	778.36	779.8	780.8	1,151.16	
PUP	Tommy Sandford	7.54%	505	564.16	590.56	599.84	612.24	674.24	695.24	719.72
UK Unionist	Grant Dillon*	4.31%	289	393.04	488.96	512.96	515.04	547.04	572.44	661.52
DUP	John Dunn*	1.10%	74	437.12	467.8	473.08	476.44	480.44		
SDLP	Sean Mullan	6.37%	427	431.08	436.44	438.6				
Independent	Alan Carson*	3.27%	219	277.48						
NI Conservatives	Terence Dick	1.22%	82	95.8						
Electorate: 10,528 Valid: 6,701 (63.65%) Spoilt: 237 Quota: 958 Turnout: 6,938 (65.90%)

== 1997 Election ==
1993: 4 x DUP, 1 x Alliance, 1 x UUP, 1 x Independent Unionist

1997: 4 x DUP, 1 x Alliance, 1 x UUP, 1 x UKUP

1993-1997 Change: Independent Unionist joins UKUP

Castlereagh Central - 6 seats
Party	Candidate	FPv%	Count					
Party	Candidate	FPv%	1	2	3	4	5	6
DUP	Peter Robinson*	55.30%	2,783					
UUP	Alan Carson*	16.97%	854					
DUP	John Norris*	1.21%	61	950.2				
Alliance	Patrick Mitchell*	11.92%	600	623.56	626.96	644.3	966.3	
DUP	John Dunn	1.73%	87	593.92	662.12	684.05	689.12	698.12
UK Unionist	Grant Dillon*	5.30%	267	516.28	528.28	591.69	609.59	684.59
DUP	Alwyn McClernon	0.46%	23	372.6	512.4	527.53	541.35	548.35
SDLP	Dominic Marsella	4.45%	224	225.52	225.52	225.69		
Alliance	Ann Smith	2.66%	134	161.36	162.76	171.94		
Electorate: 11,033 Valid: 5,033 (45.62%) Spoilt: 148 Quota: 720 Turnout: 5,181 (46.96%)

== 1993 Election ==
1989: 4 x DUP, 2 x UUP, 1 x Alliance

1993: 3 x DUP, 1 x Alliance, 1 x UUP, 1 x Independent Unionist

1989-1993 Change: Independent Unionist leaves UUP, DUP loss due to the reduction of one seat

Castlereagh Central - 6 seats
Party	Candidate	FPv%	Count								
Party	Candidate	FPv%	1	2	3	4	5	6	7	8	9
DUP	Peter Robinson*	53.27%	2,775								
Alliance	Patrick Mitchell*	15.01%	782								
UUP	Alan Carson*	12.57%	655	802							
DUP	John Norris	0.90%	47	770.75							
DUP	Cecil Moore	2.17%	113	689	695	707.8	708	723.74	737.31	746.31	
Ind. Unionist	Grant Dillon*	6.53%	340	450.25	452.75	471.31	471.83	472.63	505.81	570.92	645.92
DUP	Mary Fairfield	1.06%	55	417.25	423	431.32	431.48	433.5	442.41	469	493
Alliance	Ann Smith	3.55%	185	209.75	214.5	216.1	245.22	245.34	292.08	320.1	
UUP	Ellen Gray*	1.98%	103	142	164	174.24	174.6	174.84	206.33		
NI Conservatives	Leeburn Stitt	2.42%	126	144.75	146.75	151.23	151.75	151.81			
UUP	John Ferris	0.54%	28	46							
Electorate: 11,260 Valid: 5,209 (46.26%) Spoilt: 202 Quota: 745 Turnout: 5,411 (48.06%)

== 1989 Election ==
1985: 4 x DUP, 2 x UUP, 1 x Alliance

1989: 4 x DUP, 2 x UUP, 1 x Alliance

1985-1989 Change: No change

Castlereagh Central - 7 seats
Party	Candidate	FPv%	Count							
Party	Candidate	FPv%	1	2	3	4	5	6	7	8
DUP	Peter Robinson*	50.75%	3,461							
UUP	Grant Dillon*	13.40%	914							
Alliance	Patrick Mitchell	13.33%	909							
DUP	Alan Carson*	4.06%	277	1,895.04						
DUP	Joyce Boyd	2.70%	184	497.88	1,371.06					
UUP	Ellen Gray*	6.64%	453	616.4	657.56	684.26	733.46	970.46		
DUP	Paul McNaughten	0.38%	26	124.8	192.42	646.32	647.16	666.92	729.71	759.29
DUP	Cecil Moore	2.20%	150	510.24	553.85	583.55	584.81	621.55	675.24	699.55
Alliance	Ann Smith	6.54%	446	474.88	479.29	481.09	482.53			
Electorate: 14,462 Valid: 6,820 (47.16%) Spoilt: 188 Quota: 853 Turnout: 7,008 (48.46%)

== 1985 Election ==
1985: 4 x DUP, 2 x UUP, 1 x Alliance

Castlereagh Central - 7 seats
Party	Candidate	FPv%	Count						
Party	Candidate	FPv%	1	2	3	4	5	6	7
DUP	Peter Robinson*	52.69%	4,118						
DUP	Cedric Wilson*	0.92%	72	2,292.72					
UUP	Herbert Johnstone*	11.90%	930	1,076.68					
DUP	Alan Carson*	3.85%	301	683.28	1,651.23				
DUP	Ivan Castles	0.69%	54	211.32	413.82	1,068.22			
Alliance	Patricia Archer*	11.43%	893	921.88	958.78	962.62	968.56	983.56	
UUP	Ellen Gray*	7.73%	604	673.16	725.36	733.36	802	884.95	926.44
Alliance	Derek Middleton	5.40%	422	441	446.85	448.45	455.71	463.97	743.85
Alliance	William Moreland	3.69%	288	313.84	323.74	325.02	334.26	352.44	
Ind. Unionist	Cecil Moore	1.70%	133	189.24	213.54	218.02	225.94		
Electorate: 14,751 Valid: 7,815 (52.98%) Spoilt: 220 Quota: 977 Turnout: 8,035 (54.47%)
