= Castlereagh South (District Electoral Area) =

Electoral area in Northern Ireland

- Lisburn and Castlereagh City Council DEA constituency

Current constituency
- Created: 1985
- Seats: 7 (1985-1993); 5 (1993-2014); 7 (2014-)
- Councillors: Daniel Bassett (SF); Ryan Carlin (SF); John Gallen (SDLP); Jamie Harpur (APNI); Brian Higginson (DUP); Bronagh Magee (APNI); Martin McKeever (APNI)

Castlereagh South DEA within Lisburn and Castlereagh

Castlereagh South DEA (1993-2014) within Castlereagh

Castlereagh South is one of the seven district electoral areas (DEA) in Lisburn and Castlereagh, Northern Ireland. The district elects five members to Lisburn and Castlereagh City Council and contains the wards of Beechill, Cairnshill, Carryduff East, Carryduff West, Galwally, Knockbracken and Newtownbreda. Castlereagh South forms part of the Belfast South constituencies for the Northern Ireland Assembly and UK Parliament.

It was created for the 1985 local elections, replacing Castlereagh Area A which had existed since 1973, and originally contained seven wards (Beechill, Carryduff, Four Winds, Knockbracken, Minnowburn, Moneyreagh and Newtownbreda). For the 1993 local elections, it was reduced to five wards, with Carryduff splitting into East and West and gaining Cairnshill but losing Beechill, Minnowburn and Newtownbreda to the new Castlereagh West DEA. For the 2014 local elections, it was increased to seven wards, regaining the areas which had previously gone to Castlereagh West.

== Councillors ==
Election	Councillor (Party)	Councillor (Party)	Councillor (Party)	Councillor (Party)	Councillor (Party)	Councillor (Party)	Councillor (Party)
May 2025 Co-Option	Jamie Harpur (Alliance)	Bronagh Magee (Alliance)	Martin McKeever (Alliance)	John Gallen (SDLP)	Daniel Bassett (Sinn Féin)	Ryan Carlin (Sinn Féin)	Brian Higginson (DUP)
August 2024 Co-Option	Jamie Harpur (Alliance)	Nancy Eaton (Alliance)	Martin McKeever (Alliance)	John Gallen (SDLP)	Daniel Bassett (Sinn Féin)	Ryan Carlin (Sinn Féin)	Brian Higginson (DUP)
2023	Michelle Guy (Alliance)	Nancy Eaton (Alliance)	Martin McKeever (Alliance)	John Gallen (SDLP)	Daniel Bassett (Sinn Féin)	Ryan Carlin (Sinn Féin)	Brian Higginson (DUP)
August 2022 Defection	Michelle Guy (Alliance)	Fiona Cole (Alliance)	Simon Lee (SDLP)/ (Green Party)	John Gallen (SDLP)	Michael Henderson (UUP)	Ryan Carlin (Sinn Féin)	Nathan Anderson (DUP)/ (Independent)
May 2022 Co-Option	Michelle Guy (Alliance)	Fiona Cole (Alliance)	Simon Lee (SDLP)/ (Green Party)	John Gallen (SDLP)	Michael Henderson (UUP)	Ryan Carlin (Sinn Féin)	Nathan Anderson (DUP)/ (Independent)
September 2021 Defection	Michelle Guy (Alliance)	Sorcha Eastwood (Alliance)	Simon Lee (SDLP)/ (Green Party)	John Gallen (SDLP)	Michael Henderson (UUP)	Ryan Carlin (Sinn Féin)	Nathan Anderson (DUP)/ (Independent)
2019	Michelle Guy (Alliance)	Sorcha Eastwood (Alliance)	Simon Lee (SDLP)/ (Green Party)	John Gallen (SDLP)	Michael Henderson (UUP)	Ryan Carlin (Sinn Féin)	Nathan Anderson (DUP)/ (Independent)
November 2017 Defection	Geraldine Rice (Alliance)/ (Independent)	Vasundhara Kamble (Alliance)/ (Independent)/ (DUP)	Brian Hanvey (SDLP)	John Gallen (SDLP)	Michael Henderson (UUP)	Ben Mallon (DUP)	Nathan Anderson (DUP)/ (Independent)
February 2017 Defections	Geraldine Rice (Alliance)/ (Independent)	Vasundhara Kamble (Alliance)/ (Independent)/ (DUP)	Brian Hanvey (SDLP)	John Gallen (SDLP)	Michael Henderson (UUP)	Ben Mallon (DUP)	Nathan Anderson (DUP)/ (Independent)
2014	Geraldine Rice (Alliance)/ (Independent)	Vasundhara Kamble (Alliance)/ (Independent)/ (DUP)	Brian Hanvey (SDLP)	John Gallen (SDLP)	Michael Henderson (UUP)	Ben Mallon (DUP)	Nathan Anderson (DUP)/ (Independent)
2011	Geraldine Rice (Alliance)/ (Independent)	James Spratt (DUP)	Brian Hanvey (SDLP)	John Beattie (DUP)/ (UUP)	Michael Henderson (UUP)	5 seats 1993–2014	5 seats 1993–2014
2005	Geraldine Rice (Alliance)/ (Independent)	James Spratt (DUP)	Brian Hanvey (SDLP)	John Beattie (DUP)/ (UUP)	Michael Henderson (UUP)	5 seats 1993–2014	5 seats 1993–2014
2001	Geraldine Rice (Alliance)/ (Independent)	Barbara McBurney (UUP)	Brian Hanvey (SDLP)	John Beattie (DUP)/ (UUP)	Michael Henderson (UUP)	5 seats 1993–2014	5 seats 1993–2014
1997	Geraldine Rice (Alliance)/ (Independent)	Myreve Chambers (DUP)	Arthur Hegney (SDLP)	John Beattie (DUP)/ (UUP)	Michael Henderson (UUP)	5 seats 1993–2014	5 seats 1993–2014
1993	Geraldine Rice (Alliance)/ (Independent)	Myreve Chambers (DUP)	Margaret Marshall (Alliance)	John Beattie (DUP)/ (UUP)	Marie Luney (UUP)	5 seats 1993–2014	5 seats 1993–2014
1989	Geraldine Rice (Alliance)/ (Independent)	Myreve Chambers (DUP)	David Andrews (Alliance)	Frederick Kane (UUP)	Jean Clarke (UUP)	John Taylor (UUP)	Ernest Harper (DUP)
1985	William Clulow (DUP)	Myreve Chambers (DUP)	David Andrews (Alliance)	Frederick Kane (UUP)	James Clarke (UUP)	John Glass (UUP)	Ernest Harper (DUP)

== 2023 Election ==
2019: 2 x Alliance, 1 x DUP, 1 x SDLP, 1 x Sinn Féin, 1 x UUP, 1 x Green

2023: 3 x Alliance, 2 x Sinn Féin, 1 x DUP, 1 x SDLP

2019–2023 Change: Alliance and Sinn Féin gain from Green and UUP

Castlereagh South - 7 seats
Party	Candidate	FPv%	Count							
Party	Candidate	FPv%	1	2	3	4	5	6	7	8
Alliance	Michelle Guy* †	14.26%	1,452							
DUP	Brian Higginson	9.88%	1,006	1,009	1,009.60	1,507.72				
Alliance	Nancy Eaton	10.96%	1,116	1,121	1,183.16	1,186.16	1,188.76	1,416.76		
SDLP	John Gallen*	10.61%	1,035	1,035	1,042.08	1,044.08	1,046.16	1,147.12	1,613.12	
Sinn Féin	Ryan Carlin*	11.82%	1,204	1,207	1,213.24	1,214.24	1,214.76	1,260.76	1,314.76	
Alliance	Martin McKeever	7.14%	727	734	793.88	795.88	803.12	926.04	1,048.76	1,269.89
Sinn Féin	Daniel Bassett	9.79%	997	998	1,000.88	1,000.88	1,000.88	1,036.24	1,095.60	1,192.80
UUP	Michael Henderson*	7.46%	760	764	768.92	786.92	1,001.68	1,039.08	1,059.60	1,077.42
SDLP	Simon Lee*	6.44%	656	662	683.36	686.36	688.44	761.64		
Green (NI)	Jacinta Hamley	6.44%	656	667	675.16	675.16	677.76			
DUP	William Traynor	5.17%	527	528	528.18					
Independent	Andrew Miller	0.48%	49							
Electorate: 18,120 Valid: 10,185 (56.21%) Spoilt: 95 Quota: 1,274 Turnout: 10,280 (56.73%)

== 2019 Election ==
2014: 2 x Alliance, 2 x DUP, 2 x SDLP, 1 x UUP

2019: 2 x Alliance, 1 x DUP, 1 x SDLP, 1 x UUP, 1 x Sinn Féin, 1 x Green

2014-2019 Change: Sinn Féin and Green gain from DUP and SDLP

Castlereagh South - 7 seats
Party	Candidate	FPv%	Count									
Party	Candidate	FPv%	1	2	3	4	5	6	7	8	9	10
Alliance	Sorcha Eastwood †	17.95%	1,629									
DUP	Nathan Anderson* ‡	16.55%	1,503									
Alliance	Michelle Guy	13.62%	1,236									
SDLP	John Gallen*	10.74%	975	1,094.68	1,099.96	1,128.12	1,130.12	1,131.68	1,165.68			
Sinn Féin	Ryan Carlin	11.78%	1,069	1,107.4	1,109.32	1,115.48	1,115.48	1,117.8	1,129.92	1,263.92		
Green (NI)	Simon Lee ‡	7.14%	648	819.52	825.04	858.96	863.84	868.96	946.2	1,168.2		
UUP	Michael Henderson*	6.92%	628	657.76	683.44	690.88	759	789.12	869.52	920.92	940.92	971.6
DUP	Jason Elliott	3.69%	335	338.84	585.56	586.28	634.32	856.92	873.2	886.16	890.16	892.52
SDLP	Rachael McCarthy	5.10%	463	544.6	545.08	552.84	552.84	555.8	598.32			
Independent	Geraldine Rice*	2.61%	237	277.32	283.32	289.56	294.12	303.76				
DUP	Vasundhara Kamble*	2.29%	208	221.2	260.4	261.84	287.52					
TUV	Nicola Girvan	1.61%	146	148.88	161.6	161.92						
Electorate: 17,351 Valid: 9,077 (52.31%) Spoilt: 53 Quota: 1,135 Turnout: 9,130 (52.62%)

== 2014 Election ==
This election was carried out under new ward boundaries, as a result of local government reform.

2011: 2 x DUP, 1 x SDLP, 1 x Alliance, 1 x UUP

2014: 2 x Alliance, 2 x SDLP, 2 x DUP, 1 x UUP

2011-2014 Change: Alliance and SDLP gain due to the addition of two seats

Castlereagh South - 7 seats
Party	Candidate	FPv%	Count						
Party	Candidate	FPv%	1	2	3	4	5	6	7
Alliance	Geraldine Rice* ‡	15.06%	1,221						
SDLP	John Gallen	11.89%	964	967	981.96	1,015.3			
DUP	Nathan Anderson	11.62%	942	943	945.38	958.38	1,020.38		
UUP	Michael Henderson*	11.12%	902	904	912.84	968.52	995.37	1,277.37	
DUP	Ben Mallon	6.15%	499	499	500.02	514.02	757.7	926.06	1,091.06
Alliance	Vasundhara Kamble* ‡‡	8.25%	669	671	811.25	948.33	951.5	974.18	988.18
SDLP	Brian Hanvey*	10.80%	876	876	893.34	914.85	915.85	924.36	932.36
Sinn Féin	Nuala Toman	9.90%	803	803	809.8	822.97	823.97	823.97	823.97
TUV	Wallace Douglas	6.41%	520	521	523.72	537.89	544.89		
DUP	Vikki Nelson*	4.43%	359	360	361.7	365.87			
NI21	Elizabeth McCord	3.58%	290	346	353.31				
NI21	Adam Murray	0.85%	69						
Electorate: 16,309 Valid: 8,110 (49.73%) Spoilt: 88 Quota: 1,015 Turnout: 8,198 (50.27%)

== 2011 Election ==
2005: 2 x DUP, 1 x SDLP, 1 x Alliance, 1 x UUP

2011: 2 x DUP, 1 x SDLP, 1 x Alliance, 1 x UUP

2005-2011 Change: No change

Castlereagh South - 5 seats
Party	Candidate	FPv%	Count					
Party	Candidate	FPv%	1	2	3	4	5	6
DUP	James Spratt*	23.75%	1,535					
Alliance	Geraldine Rice*	19.64%	1,269					
DUP	John Beattie*	12.74%	823	1,229.8				
SDLP	Brian Hanvey*	14.67%	948	949.8	993.49	996.37	1,041.66	1,289.66
UUP	Michael Henderson*	9.15%	591	610.8	648.54	748.22	1,022.29	1,024.92
SDLP	Sean Mullan	7.89%	510	513	542.58	543.22	584.68	759.44
Sinn Féin	James Irwin	7.10%	459	460.5	464.75	464.91	478.94	
UUP	Barbara McBurney	2.86%	185	201.5	229.89	268.93		
Green (NI)	Rebecca Volley	2.20%	142	143.8	190.04	195.8		
Electorate: 12,061 Valid: 6,462 (53.58%) Spoilt: 90 Quota: 1,078 Turnout: 6,552 (54.32%)

== 2005 Election ==
2001: 2 x UUP, 1 x DUP, 1 x SDLP, 1 x Alliance

2005: 2 x DUP, 1 x UUP, 1 x SDLP, 1 x Alliance

2001-2005 Change: DUP gain from UUP

Castlereagh South - 5 seats
Party	Candidate	FPv%	Count			
Party	Candidate	FPv%	1	2	3	4
DUP	James Spratt	19.06%	1,317			
DUP	John Beattie*	17.64%	1,219			
Alliance	Geraldine Rice*	17.08%	1,180			
UUP	Michael Henderson*	14.14%	977	1,082.75	1,125.71	1,385.71
SDLP	Brian Hanvey*	16.09%	1,112	1,114.85	1,116.65	1,138.43
SDLP	Leo Van Es	6.09%	421	422.8	423.1	431.31
Sinn Féin	Dermot Kennedy	5.72%	395	395.45	395.51	396.66
UUP	Barbara McBurney*	4.17%	288	333.3	346.14	
Electorate: 11,421 Valid: 6,909 (60.49%) Spoilt: 99 Quota: 1,152 Turnout: 7,008 (61.36%)

== 2001 Election ==
1997: 2 x UUP, 1 x DUP, 1 x SDLP, 1 x Alliance

2001: 2 x UUP, 1 x DUP, 1 x SDLP, 1 x Alliance

1997-2001 Change: No change

Castlereagh South - 5 seats
Party	Candidate	FPv%	Count								
Party	Candidate	FPv%	1	2	3	4	5	6	7	8	9
UUP	Michael Henderson*	21.58%	1,725								
DUP	John Beattie*	19.89%	1,590								
Alliance	Geraldine Rice*	12.75%	1,019	1,038.32	1,046.01	1,049.05	1,068.05	1,371.05			
UUP	Barbara McBurney	5.39%	431	766.57	796.56	815.28	815.28	857.27	1,366		
SDLP	Brian Hanvey	11.76%	940	942.3	942.3	942.78	1,145.01	1,156.47	1,160.11	1,171.51	1,178.17
SDLP	Christine Copeland	11.87%	949	950.38	951.38	951.54	1,090.54	1,108.48	1,114.85	1,139.72	1,163.72
DUP	Andrew Ramsey	6.37%	509	522.34	527.03	753.27	753.27	763.6			
Alliance	Margaret Marshall	4.77%	381	384.11	399.8	401.4	406.4				
Sinn Féin	Sean Hayes	4.95%	396	396.23	396.23	396.23					
NI Conservatives	Roger Lomas	0.65%	52	57.52							
Electorate: 12,212 Valid: 7,992 (65.44%) Spoilt: 159 Quota: 1,333 Turnout: 8,151 (66.75%)

== 1997 Election ==
1993: 2 x UUP, 2 x Alliance, 1 x DUP

1997: 2 x UUP, 1 x Alliance, 1 x DUP, 1 x SDLP

1993-1997 Change: SDLP gain from Alliance

Castlereagh South - 5 seats
Party	Candidate	FPv%	Count					
Party	Candidate	FPv%	1	2	3	4	5	6
UUP	John Beattie*	24.66%	1,219					
DUP	Myreve Chambers*	23.18%	1,146					
SDLP	Arthur Hegney	17.48%	864					
UUP	Michael Henderson	6.57%	325	681.4	705.2	862.2		
Alliance	Geraldine Rice*	12.70%	628	634.27	639.31	675.55	697.4	714.45
Alliance	Margaret Marshall*	11.25%	556	564.91	569.67	647.48	664.53	685.43
DUP	Andrew Ramsey	4.95%	205	224.8	505.36			
Electorate: 11,873 Valid: 4,943 (41.63%) Spoilt: 67 Quota: 824 Turnout: 5,010 (42.20%)

== 1993 Election ==
1989: 3 x UUP, 2 x DUP, 2 x Alliance

1993: 2 x Alliance, 2 x UUP, 1 x DUP

1989-1993 Change: UUP and DUP loss due to the reduction of two seats

Castlereagh South - 5 seats
Party	Candidate	FPv%	Count					
Party	Candidate	FPv%	1	2	3	4	5	6
UUP	John Beattie	22.75%	1,003					
DUP	Myreve Chambers*	22.14%	976					
Alliance	Geraldine Rice*	18.94%	835					
Alliance	Margaret Marshall	12.18%	537	543.48	553.48	557.73	654.1	749.5
UUP	Marie Luney	8.23%	363	585.48	586.48	601.73	726.95	728.15
DUP	Charlie Tosh	8.35%	368	379.88	380.88	592.88	625.54	626.62
NI Conservatives	Michael Henderson	6.37%	281	299.09	329.36	335.61		
NI Conservatives	Joyce Young	1.04%	46	46.81				
Electorate: 10,556 Valid: 4,409 (41.77%) Spoilt: 118 Quota: 735 Turnout: 4,527 (42.89%)

== 1989 Election ==
1985: 3 x DUP, 3 x UUP, 1 x Alliance

1989: 3 x UUP, 2 x DUP, 2 x Alliance

1985-1989 Change: Alliance gain from DUP

Castlereagh South - 7 seats
Party	Candidate	FPv%	Count						
Party	Candidate	FPv%	1	2	3	4	5	6	7
UUP	John Taylor	26.15%	2,039						
DUP	Ernest Harper*	25.06%	1,954						
Alliance	David Andrews*	17.50%	1,364						
DUP	Myreve Chambers*	5.54%	432	484.47	1,258.97				
Alliance	Geraldine Rice	7.76%	605	633.62	638.12	978.04			
UUP	Jean Clarke	8.56%	667	928.82	954.82	972.18	976.14		
UUP	Frederick Kane*	5.16%	402	812.22	838.72	851.88	857.46	870.46	1,013.46
DUP	Thomas Scott	1.37%	107	154.7	220.7	223.22	453.62	585.13	600.13
UUP	Marie Luney	2.10%	164	396.67	408.17	410.69	412.31	422.23	
DUP	Gillian McCorkell	0.80%	62	83.2	141.2	142.6	178.6		
Electorate: 17,232 Valid: 7,796 (45.24%) Spoilt: 210 Quota: 975 Turnout: 8,006 (46.46%)

== 1985 Election ==
1985: 3 x DUP, 3 x UUP, 1 x Alliance

Castlereagh South - 7 seats
Party	Candidate	FPv%	Count							
Party	Candidate	FPv%	1	2	3	4	5	6	7	8
DUP	Ernest Harper*	16.35%	1,369							
DUP	William Clulow*	14.96%	1,253							
UUP	James Clarke	13.85%	1,160							
UUP	John Glass*	12.60%	1,055							
Alliance	David Andrews	11.85%	992	996.6	1,000.12	1,001.83	1,009.24	1,076.24		
UUP	Frederick Kane*	9.05%	758	769.73	786.53	876.89	902.04	912.72	1,017.04	1,068.04
DUP	Myreve Chambers	4.97%	416	653.59	692.79	697.74	727.07	728.76	736.86	1,056.39
SDLP	Peggy Hanna	5.45%	456	456	456.48	456.66	457.05	462.23	635.32	639.32
DUP	Mark Robinson	3.77%	316	371.2	491.2	494.53	535.63	537.95	545.27	
Alliance	Edward McMillan	3.56%	298	298.69	299.81	300.08	300.08	404.33		
Alliance	Ernest Crockett	2.25%	188	188.92	189.88	190.96	191.96			
Ind. Unionist	William Stevenson	1.35%	113	114.38	126.22	126.76				
Electorate: 15,485 Valid: 8,374 (54.08%) Spoilt: 161 Quota: 1,047 Turnout: 8,535 (55.12%)
