= Denny Vitty =

Northern Irish unionist politician

Member of Castlereagh Borough Council
- In office 9 December 2010 – 22 May 2014
- Preceded by: Joanne Bunting
- Succeeded by: Council abolished
- Constituency: Castlereagh Central
- In office 15 May 1985 – 17 May 1989
- Preceded by: District created
- Succeeded by: Iris Robinson
- Constituency: Castlereagh East
- In office 20 May 1981 – 15 May 1985
- Preceded by: Bryan Davidson
- Succeeded by: District abolished
- Constituency: Castlereagh Area C

Member of North Down Borough Council
- In office 17 May 1989 – 19 May 1993
- Preceded by: Ivy Cooling
- Succeeded by: Ivy Cooling
- Constituency: Abbey

Member of the Northern Ireland Assembly for Belfast East
- In office 1982–1986

Personal details
- Born: 1949 (age 76–77)
- Party: DUP (before 1996; since 1998)
- Other political affiliations: UK Unionist Party (1996 - 1998)

Denny Vitty (born 1949) is a Northern Irish unionist politician.

== Career ==
Vitty was elected to Castlereagh Borough Council for the Democratic Unionist Party (DUP) in 1981, despite only taking 35 first preference votes, as he received transfers from Peter Robinson.

He was then elected to the Northern Ireland Assembly, 1982, as a member of the Democratic Unionist Party for Belfast East - having won only 235 first preference votes.

In 1989, Vitty stood down from Castlereagh Borough Council and was instead elected to North Down Borough Council, In 1991, he served as the Mayor of North Down. He then stood unsuccessfully for the Westminster seat of North Down at the 1992 UK general election, taking only 9.8% of the vote. In 1993, he did not restand for the council.

Vitty left the DUP and joined the UK Unionist Party (UKUP) in the 1990s. He stood for the UKUP at the 1998 Northern Ireland Assembly election. He was the last candidate to be eliminated in Belfast East.

Subsequently, he rejoined the DUP and was co-opted to fill a vacancy on Castlereagh Borough Council in December 2010. He was re-elected at the 2011 local elections. At the 2014 local elections, he stood in the Ormiston District Electoral Area of Belfast City Council, but was unsuccessful.

Northern Ireland Assembly (1982)
New assembly	MPA for East Belfast; 1982–1986	Assembly abolished
Civic offices
Preceded by Hazel Bradford	Mayor of North Down; 1990–1991	Succeeded by Leslie Cree
