= John Taylor, Baron Kilclooney =

British life peer, born 1937

The Right Honourable The Lord Kilclooney PC (NI)
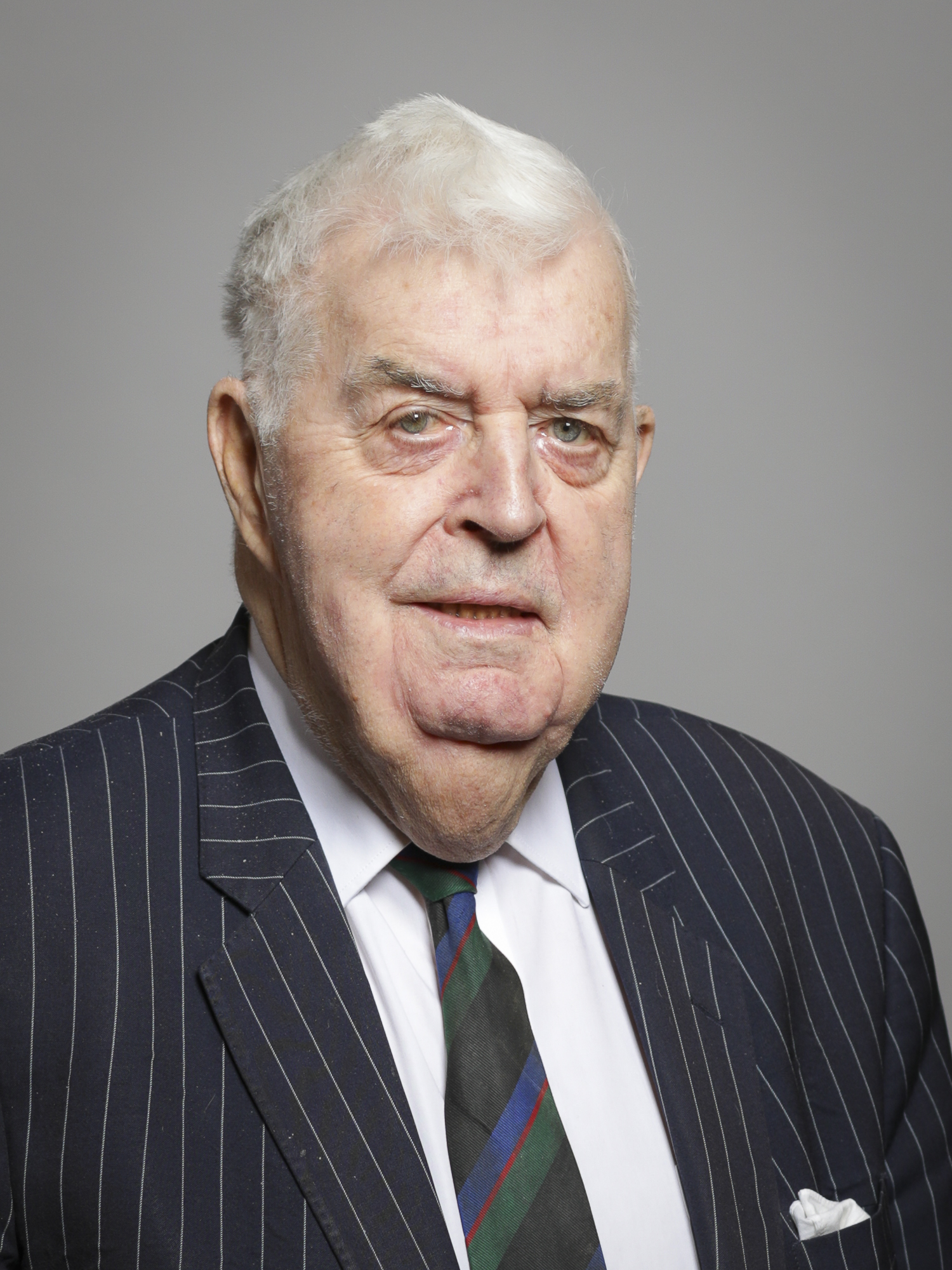
- Official portrait, 2019

Deputy Leader of the Ulster Unionist Party
- In office 1995–2001
- Leader: David Trimble

Member of the House of Lords
- Lord Temporal
- Life peerage 17 July 2001

Member of the Legislative Assembly for Strangford
- In office 25 June 1998 – 7 March 2007
- Preceded by: Constituency created
- Succeeded by: Michelle McIlveen

Member of Parliament for Strangford
- In office 9 June 1983 – 14 May 2001
- Preceded by: Constituency created
- Succeeded by: Iris Robinson

Northern Ireland Forum Member for Strangford
- In office 30 May 1996 – 25 April 1998
- Preceded by: New forum
- Succeeded by: Forum dissolved

Member of Castlereagh Borough Council
- In office 17 May 1989 – 19 May 1993
- Preceded by: John Glass
- Succeeded by: Seat abolished
- Constituency: Castlereagh South

Member of the European Parliament for Northern Ireland
- In office 10 June 1979 – 15 June 1989
- Preceded by: Constituency created
- Succeeded by: Jim Nicholson

Member of the Legislative Assembly for North Down
- In office 20 October 1982 – 1986
- Preceded by: Assembly re-established
- Succeeded by: Assembly dissolved
- In office 28 June 1973 – 1974
- Preceded by: Assembly established
- Succeeded by: Assembly abolished

Member of the Constitutional Convention for North Down
- In office 1975–1976
- Preceded by: New convention
- Succeeded by: Convention dissolved

Member of the Northern Ireland Parliament for South Tyrone
- In office 25 November 1965 – 30 March 1972
- Preceded by: William Frederick McCoy
- Succeeded by: Constituency abolished

Personal details
- Born: John David Taylor; 24 December 1937 (age 88) Armagh, Northern Ireland
- Party: Crossbench (2001 – present); Ulster Unionist Party (Pre 2007)
- Spouse: Mary Todd (d. 2023)
- Children: 6
- Education: Queen's University Belfast

John David Taylor, Baron Kilclooney (born 24 December 1937) is a Northern Irish unionist politician who was deputy leader of the Ulster Unionist Party (UUP) from 1995 to 2001, and the member of Parliament (MP) for Strangford from 1983 to 2001. Lord Kilclooney has sat as a crossbench life peer in the House of Lords since 2001. He was a member of the Northern Ireland Assembly (MLA) for Strangford from 1998 to 2007.

Kilclooney also served as a member of the European Parliament (MEP) for Northern Ireland from 1979 to 1989.

== Early life ==
John Taylor was born in Armagh in County Armagh, Northern Ireland. He was educated at The Royal School, Armagh, and Queen's University Belfast, where he graduated with a Bachelor of Science (BSc) degree.

== Political career ==
Taylor's political career began as MP for South Tyrone in the Northern Ireland House of Commons between 1970 and 1972, and he served in the Government of Northern Ireland as Minister of State at the Ministry of Home Affairs.

On 25 February 1972, he survived an assassination attempt in Armagh by the Official Irish Republican Army. Two men, including Joe McCann (who was himself shot dead some months afterwards whilst evading arrest), raked his car with bullets, hitting Taylor five times in the neck and head. Taylor survived, but needed extensive reconstructive surgery on his jaw. Despite this, Taylor soon re-entered politics. He represented Fermanagh & South Tyrone in the short-lived Northern Ireland Assembly elected in 1973 and dissolved in 1974, following the collapse of the power-sharing Executive.

He became a Member of the European Parliament (MEP) for Northern Ireland in 1979, remaining an MEP until 1989. On 20 January 1987, Taylor left the European Democrats, with whom the Conservatives sat, to join the European Right group.

He was elected to the Northern Ireland Assembly in 1982 for North Down. He then became MP for Strangford in 1983, until 2001. He was a member of Castlereagh Borough Council from 1993 to 1997. In February 1989 he joined the anti-communist Conservative Monday Club and appears on the list of their speakers at the Annual Conference of its Young Members' Group at the United Oxford & Cambridge Club in Pall Mall, on 18 November 1989, when he spoke on 'The Union and Northern Ireland'.

Following the 2001 general election, on 17 July he was created a life peer as Baron Kilclooney, of Armagh in the County of Armagh, sitting as a crossbencher. He sat on the Northern Ireland Policing Board from 4 November 2001 until 31 March 2006. He continued to sit as a member of the Northern Ireland Assembly until his retirement prior to the elections in March 2007. He remains the only active politician to have participated in all levels of government in Northern Ireland, from local council, the Parliament of Northern Ireland, Westminster, Europe, all previous failed Assemblies and Conventions and the current incarnation of the Assembly.

In January 2012, Lord Kilclooney wrote to The Scotsman newspaper asserting that Scotland should be subject to partition, depending on the outcome of the Scottish independence referendum.

== Personal life ==
Lord Kilclooney is a member of the Farmers Club in London, and the County Club in Armagh City.

He owns Alpha Newspapers, which operates local newspaper titles in Northern Ireland and the Republic.

He married Mary Todd in 1970, and has six children. His wife died in September 2023.

== Controversies ==
In 1988, the then John Taylor replied to a letter from Gearoid Ó Muilleoir, deputy president of the Student's Union in Queen's University Belfast, relating to grants for students in Northern Ireland. Taylor's letter said, "Since your surname is clearly unpronounceable I have, rightly or wrongly, concluded that you are Irish and not British. I therefore suggest that you, and those whom you represent, apply for any necessary grants to the Dublin Government."

Taylor aroused controversy for comments regarding the 1992 murder of five Catholic men and boys by the Ulster Defence Association: "...and it is pointed out that the murder of Roman Catholics at Sean Graham's on the Ormeau Road encouraged the Catholic community to publicly condemn the IRA and to point out that these innocent Catholics would not have been murdered had the IRA not firstly committed the terrible slaughter of eight Protestants at Teebane."

In September 1993, Taylor described Loyalist paramilitary victims (overwhelmingly Catholic civilians) "generally" as "members of organisations which support the IRA". Earlier that same month he also said the increasing fear amongst Catholics might be helpful because they were beginning to "appreciate" the fear in the Protestant community.

Taylor later repudiated being Irish in a debate in Dublin: "We in Northern Ireland are not Irish. We do not jig at crossroads, speak Gaelic, play GAA etc… It is an insult for Dubliners to refer to us as being Irish."

In 1997, British Prime Minister Tony Blair issued a statement on the Irish Famine, in which he said "those governed in London at the time failed their people through standing by while a crop failure turned into a massive human tragedy. We must not forget such a dreadful event." Taylor said, "I suppose it is a nice gesture by the prime minister but he will find it will not satisfy and there will be yet more demands. The Irish mentality is one of victimhood – they ask for one apology one week and another on a different subject the next."

In November 2017, Taylor attracted criticism for describing the then-Taoiseach of the Republic of Ireland Leo Varadkar as "the Indian". Taylor withdrew his comment, stating that he had forgotten how to spell the Irish head of government's name, despite spelling it in an earlier tweet. Despite this contrition, in May 2018 Taylor once again referred to Varadkar as a "typical Indian" following Varadkar's visit to Northern Ireland. This time Taylor stood by his comment, stating that the Taoiseach had "upset Unionists" with his visit, but reiterated that he was not a racist.

In April 2018, Taylor faced calls to apologise after claiming McGurk's Bar, bombed by the Ulster Volunteer Force (UVF) in 1971, was a "drinking hole for IRA sympathisers" who had run a "political campaign to place the blame on the UVF". The UVF attack, which killed 15 people, was one of the deadliest incidents in Northern Ireland during the Troubles. Taylor, who was a Stormont minister at the time of the bombing, wrongly claimed the massacre was an IRA device that exploded prematurely inside the premises. Pat Irvine, who was aged 14 when her mother Kathleen was killed in the attack, said "I'm actually disgusted with him, that he's so blatant with his hatred and bitterness."

On 9 November 2020, Taylor made a series of statements on Twitter about American Vice-President-Elect Kamala Harris, saying, "What happens if Biden moves on and the Indian becomes President. Who then becomes Vice President?" When challenged, he said that he did not know the name of the vice-president elect, by way of explaining his term of reference. He said, "I had never heard of her nor knew her name is Harris. India is quite rightly celebrating that an Indian, who has USA citizenship, has been appointed Vice President elect".

Taylor had previously been labelled an "old racist dinosaur" by Piers Morgan, for comments he had made in 2017 about cricketer Moeen Ali. Taylor had said on Twitter that, "Times have changed! The England team now needs non English people in order to win Test Games". When it was pointed out that Ali was born in Britain, Taylor responded, "Moeen Ali is proud to be British but racially he is not English. There is a difference between being English and being British!!", adding that, "A Chinese born in England is Chinese and not English!".

In July 2021, during the Euro 2021 football competition, Taylor posted remarks on Twitter criticising the Spain national football team for not singing their national anthem at the start of football matches. Commentators on Twitter responded by pointing out that the Spanish national anthem does not, in fact, have any lyrics.

== Arms ==
Coat of arms of John Taylor, Baron Kilclooney

Coronet
A Coronet of a Baron
Crest
A Tailor Bird Or grasping a Bush eradicated Azure enflamed Or
Escutcheon
Azure issuing in base three Representations of the Scrabo Tower Argent with windows framed and Pinnacles Or each ensigned by a Viking Helm Argent horned Or
Supporters
On either side an Irish Elk Gules unguled and attired Or resting the exterior forehoof upon an Ulster Gatepost Argent
Motto
A While Fer Wark An A While Fer Spoartin
Badge
An Irish Elk's Head caboshed Gules attired Or

== See also ==
- List of Northern Ireland Members of the House of Lords

== Footnotes ==
Parliament of Northern Ireland
Preceded by W.F. McCoy	Member of Parliament for South Tyrone; 1965–1973	Parliament abolished
Northern Ireland Assembly (1973)
New assembly	Assembly Member for Fermanagh & South Tyrone; 1973–1974	Assembly abolished
Northern Ireland Constitutional Convention
New convention	Member for North Down; 1975–1976	Convention dissolved
European Parliament
New constituency	MEP for Northern Ireland; 1979–1989	Succeeded by Jim Nicholson
Northern Ireland Assembly (1982)
New assembly	MPA for North Down; 1982–1986	Assembly abolished
Parliament of the United Kingdom
New constituency	Member of Parliament for Strangford; 1983–2001	Succeeded by Iris Robinson
Northern Ireland Forum
New forum	Member for Strangford; 1996–1998	Forum dissolved
Northern Ireland Assembly
New assembly	MLA for Strangford; 1998–2007	Succeeded by Michelle McIlveen
Political offices
Preceded by Robert Porter	Parliamentary Secretary to the Ministry of Home Affairs; 1970	Office abolished
New office	Minister of State, Ministry of Home Affairs; 1970–1972	Office abolished
Party political offices
Vacant Office abolished Title last held by Harold McCusker	Deputy Leader of the Ulster Unionist Party; 1995–2002	Succeeded by Sir Reg Empey
Orders of precedence in the United Kingdom
Preceded by Lord Heseltine	Gentlemen; Baron Kilclooney	Followed by Lord Maginnis of Drumglass
