= Iris Robinson =

British politician (born 1949)

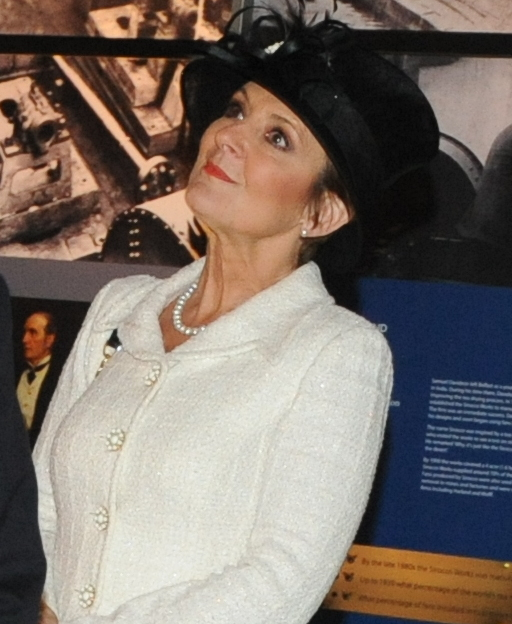
- Robinson in 2012

Member of Parliament for Strangford
- In office 7 June 2001 – 13 January 2010
- Preceded by: John Taylor
- Succeeded by: Jim Shannon

Member of the Northern Ireland Assembly for Strangford
- In office 25 June 1998 – 12 January 2010
- Preceded by: Office Created
- Succeeded by: Jonathan Bell

Democratic Unionist Party Spokesperson for Health
- In office 2001 – 9 January 2010
- Leader: Ian Paisley; Peter Robinson

Mayor of Castlereagh
- In office 1995–1996
- In office 1992–1993

Member of Castlereagh Borough Council
- In office 17 May 1989 – 13 January 2010
- Preceded by: Denny Vitty
- Succeeded by: Tim Morrow
- Constituency: Castlereagh East

Northern Ireland Forum Member for Strangford
- In office 30 May 1996 – 25 April 1998
- Preceded by: Forum created
- Succeeded by: Forum dissolved

Personal details
- Born: Iris Collins; 6 September 1949 (age 77) Belfast, Northern Ireland, UK
- Party: Independent (2010–present); Democratic Unionist Party (until 2010)
- Spouse: Peter Robinson (1970–present)
- Children: 3
- Education: Cregagh Technical College
- Profession: Secretary

Iris Robinson (née Collins; born 6 September 1949) is a former Democratic Unionist Party (DUP) politician in Northern Ireland. She is married to Peter Robinson, who was First Minister of Northern Ireland from 2008 to 2016.

Robinson was first elected councillor for Castlereagh Borough Council in 1989, and served as Mayor in 1992 and 1995. She was a member of the Northern Ireland Forum for Political Dialogue from 1995 to 1997. In 1998 she was elected to the Northern Ireland Assembly for the Democratic Unionist Party as member for Strangford, acting as Deputy Whip and health spokesperson. She was elected as DUP Member of Parliament for Strangford at the 2001 general election, replacing the Ulster Unionist Party's John Taylor. She was re-elected at the 2005 general election.

Robinson describes herself as a born-again Christian, and has publicly stated that "the government has the responsibility to uphold God's laws". In light of this, she was criticised for her views on homosexuality in 2008.

In December 2009, Robinson announced that she would leave politics and withdraw from public life following prolonged periods of mental illness. In January 2010, it emerged that Robinson had an extramarital affair with a 19-year-old in 2008, and she and her husband were faced with allegations of financial impropriety related to the affair. It was announced on 9 January 2010 that her membership of the DUP had been terminated, and that she would stand down from elected office. On 12 January 2010 she resigned from the Northern Ireland Assembly, and on 13 January 2010, she resigned from the House of Commons and from Castlereagh Borough Council.

== Personal life ==
The oldest of seven children, Iris Collins was born in Belfast, Northern Ireland to Mary McCarten and Joseph Collins, an English soldier. She grew up in a working-class area in the east of the city. She describes herself as a born again Christian and attends Metropolitan Tabernacle Church in Belfast. She comes from a family with a mixed religious background as ten of her first cousins are Roman Catholics. She attended Cregagh Primary School, Knockbreda Intermediate School and Cregagh Technical College before becoming a secretary.

She married Peter Robinson on 26 July 1970. They were the first husband and wife ever to represent Northern Ireland constituencies in Parliament at the same time. They have three grown-up children: Jonathan, Gareth and Rebekah. Gareth Robinson is also a former Councillor on Castlereagh Borough Council.

Outside politics Robinson listed her interests as charity fundraising for multiple sclerosis, interior design and horseriding.

== Political career ==
Robinson was first elected councillor for Castlereagh (borough) in 1989. She became the Council's first woman mayor in 1992 and served as mayor again in 1995. She was a member of the Northern Ireland Forum for Political Dialogue from 1995 to 1997. She was elected to the Northern Ireland Assembly in 1998, representing the constituency of Strangford. She acted as the DUP health spokesperson.

Robinson was elected as the DUP Member of the Parliament of the United Kingdom for Strangford at the 2001 general election, replacing the Ulster Unionist Party's John Taylor. She was re-elected at the 2005 general election.

Since taking up her seat in the House of Commons, Robinson has voted in 32 per cent of votes in parliament, below the average among MPs. In her maiden speech she spoke about the "betrayal" felt by the Royal Ulster Constabulary, criticising the Government's policy on policing.

Robinson's voting record shows that she voted strongly against introducing foundation hospitals, very strongly for the Iraq War, moderately for an investigation into said war, voted moderately against LGBT rights, and never voted on transparent Parliament or on replacing Trident. Robinson also voted for Labour's 42-day terror detention, part of the Counter-Terrorism Bill.

Robinson was suspended from Stormont for a day on 19 November 2007 after refusing to withdraw "unparliamentary" comments she had made about the health minister, Michael McGimpsey.

In an interview with the Sunday Tribune in April 2008, anticipating becoming "First Lady" of Northern Ireland, Iris spoke out against Hillary Clinton alluding to her husband's affair with Monica Lewinsky: "No woman would put up with what she tolerated from her husband when he was president. She was thinking only of her future political career. It's all about power and not principle."

== Comments about homosexuality ==
In June 2008, shortly after a physical assault on a homosexual man in Northern Ireland, she made comments on the BBC Radio Ulster's The Nolan Show offering to recommend homosexuals to psychiatric counselling. While condemning the attack, she called homosexuality an "abomination" that made her feel "sick" and "nauseous", and offered to refer homosexuals to a psychiatrist she knew. In a subsequent interview, Robinson defended her views and denied prejudice against homosexuals, saying that "just as a murderer can be redeemed by the blood of Christ, so can a homosexual.... If anyone takes issue, they're taking issue with the word of God". Her comments were rebuffed by representatives of the Royal College of Psychiatrists, the Rainbow Project, the Alliance Party, Sinn Féin, and the Social Democratic and Labour Party. The psychiatrist in question, Dr. Paul Miller later resigned as her adviser and stood down from his post of consultant psychiatrist at Belfast's Mater hospital. He is no longer a consultant psychiatrist within the NHS and has been reported to the General Medical Council (GMC). A police investigation followed these comments, over 100 complaints were made, and gay rights activist Robert Toner also made a complaint to the Equality Commission.

Robinson subsequently repeated her views in parliamentary session. Speaking in a 17 June 2008 Northern Ireland Grand Committee session on Risk Assessment and Management of Sex Offenders, she said: "There can be no viler act, apart from homosexuality and sodomy, than sexually abusing innocent children." She reiterated her statement to the Belfast Telegraph on 21 June 2008, but later stated that she had been "misrepresented" in Hansard. This statement was challenged when Alliance Party Executive Director Gerry Lynch confirmed with Hansard staff that Robinson's comments were in fact correctly quoted. Further controversy was caused on 17 July 2008 when on The Nolan Show Robinson stated "it is the government's responsibility to uphold God's law". In the Northern Ireland Assembly on 30 June 2008, in a discussion about "LGBT Groups: Mental-Health Needs", Robinson said that "Homosexuality, like all sin, is an abomination", and suggested that teenagers needed help deciding whether they were homosexual or heterosexual. During this period, Robinson herself was having an extra-marital affair with a 19-year-old man.

By late July 2008, the Belfast Telegraph reported that "[A]lmost 11,000 people have signed a petition calling on British Prime Minister Gordon Brown to reprimand DUP MP Iris Robinson over her controversial remarks about homosexuality" and "[Fewer than] 30 people have signed an opposing petition calling on the Prime Minister to allow the comments to go un-reprimanded as a matter of personal opinion and religion". As a result of her comments, Robinson was named "Bigot of the Year" for 2008 by Stonewall.

== Parliamentary expenses ==
In April 2009, both Iris and Peter Robinson came under fire after Commons MPs' expenses accounts were leaked to the press. The couple were described as the "swish family Robinson" by the News of the World and Daily Mail after claims that they were receiving £571,939.41 a year in various salaries and expenses.

== Extramarital affair and financial investigation ==
On 28 December 2009, and immediately prior to the airing of an investigative BBC programme looking at her personal life and financial dealings, Robinson announced her decision to retire from politics after claiming that she had been suffering serious bouts of stress and depression. At the time she said the stress and strain of public life came at a cost, and that her health had suffered.

On 6 January 2010, Robinson issued a statement in which she said that she had attempted suicide on 1 March 2009. BBC's Spotlight programme revealed on 7 January 2010 that Robinson had had an affair with Kirk McCambley, who was 19 years old at the time. It is also alleged that she encouraged friends to provide financial backing to assist her lover in a business venture. According to a BBC investigation, the payments she arranged from two property developers to McCambley were £50,000. As the £50,000 was not declared to the Northern Ireland Assembly, this action broke the law. Robinson subsequently asked McCambley for £5,000 in cash; as well as a cheque made out to Dundonald's Light 'n Life Church, where Peter Robinson's sister, Rev. Pat Herron is pastor. It is alleged that Peter pressed his wife to return this money – however, he did not inform the proper authorities about the large monetary transactions, which is a breach of his duty and responsibility as First Minister of Northern Ireland. Reports have been made of further affairs, with among others, Kirk McCambley's father Billy, who died in 2008.

Robinson's intention to retire from elected office was announced on 11 January 2010 and she resigned on 13 January 2010.

Castlereagh Borough Council announced on 14 January 2010 that it had voted to carry out an external investigation in the catering contract awarded to Kirk McCambley. Terms of reference for the investigation include identifying if the Council incurred any financial loss and whether officers and elected representatives complied with the requirements of all relevant local government legislation and guidance in the awarding the lease for the Lock-Keeper's Inn. On 26 May 2011, the DUP announced that an independent investigation has "cleared Iris Robinson of any wrongdoing in connection with the awarding of a contract to her former teenage lover", though the findings of the investigative report have not been publicly circulated.

The PSNI announced on 21 January 2010 that they were to conduct an investigation into Iris Robinson's financial affairs. On 20 February 2010 officers from PSNI searched the offices of Castlereagh Borough Council as part of this investigation. On 25 June 2010, it became public that Robinson had been interviewed as part of a police investigation over money she obtained from two developers.

Robinson reportedly received "acute psychiatric treatment" and was under 24-hour suicide watch following the BBC Spotlight documentary.

== Later years ==
It was reported that Robinson had been receiving psychiatric treatment in a London clinic from January 2010 and returned to Northern Ireland on 19 September 2010 to continue treatment.

Robinson made her first appearance in public almost seven months after her return, at the funeral of her mother at Bethany Free Presbyterian Church in County Armagh on 14 April 2011. Among the mourners was deputy First Minister Martin McGuinness who embraced Robinson on the steps of the church.

Her husband stated his wife was too ill to attend the wedding of Prince William of Wales and Kate Middleton on 29 April 2011. Robinson did, however, attend the state banquet in Dublin during the Queen's visit to the Republic of Ireland 20 days later on 18 May 2011.

On 8 November 2019, an opera featuring Robinson's homophobic views was staged in Belfast. Abomination, A DUP Opera, composed by Conor Mitchell, opened the 2019 Outburst Queer Arts Festival at the Lyric Theatre. It toured Belfast and Dublin in 2022, before receiving its London premiere at the Southbank Arts Centre in May 2023.

Northern Ireland Forum
New forum	Member for Strangford; 1996–1998	Forum dissolved
Northern Ireland Assembly
New assembly	MLA for Strangford; 1998–2010	Succeeded by Jonathan Bell
Parliament of the United Kingdom
Preceded by John Taylor	Member of Parliament for Strangford; 2001–2010	Succeeded by Jim Shannon
