= Mark Robinson (Northern Ireland politician) =

Unionist politician (born 1959)

Member of the Northern Ireland Assembly for Belfast South
- In office 25 June 1998 – 7 March 2007
- Preceded by: New Creation
- Succeeded by: Jimmy Spratt

Personal details
- Born: 12 May 1959 (age 67) Belfast, Northern Ireland
- Party: Democratic Unionist Party

Mark Simon Peter Robinson (born 12 May 1959) is a Democratic Unionist Party (DUP) politician, who was a Member of the Northern Ireland Assembly (MLA) for Belfast South from 1998 to 2007. He served two terms, from the inception of the Assembly in 1998 until 2007.

== Political career ==
In 1998 he was elected to the Northern Ireland Assembly from Belfast South. He increased his vote in the 2003 election and was returned in second place. He ran for re-election in 2007 but was defeated by Jimmy Spratt.

He also served two terms on Castlereagh Borough Council, being elected in 2001.

He has come under fire in the media for running up one of the highest travel expenses of any of the 108 MLAs, despite representing a constituency neighbouring that which Parliament Buildings is in. A party source said that he was living outside his constituency for family reasons. He declared part-time employment with Marks and Spencer in the Register of Members' Interests in 2006 on top of his Assembly salary.

Northern Ireland Assembly
New assembly	MLA for Belfast South; 1998–2007	Succeeded by Jimmy Spratt
