= Castlereagh (borough) =

District of Northern Ireland (1973–2015)

Coordinates: 54°35′N 5°52′W

Castlereagh Borough: Irish: An Caisleán Riabhach; Scots: Stye Braes o Ulidia Burgh
- Area: 85 km^{2} (33 sq mi); Ranked 24th of 26
- Population: 67,272 (2011 census)
  - Density: 791/km^{2} (2,050/sq mi)
- District HQ: Upper Galwally, Newtownbreda
- Catholic: 22.2%
- Protestant: 67.9%
- Country: Northern Ireland
- Sovereign state: United Kingdom
- Councillors: MLAs DUP: 7 Alliance Party: 4 UUP: 4 Sinn Féin: 1 SDLP: 2; MPs Claire Hanna (SDLP) Gavin Robinson (DUP) Jim Shannon (DUP)
- Website: www.castlereagh.gov.uk

Castlereagh (/ˈkɑːsəlreɪ/ KAH-səl-ray) was a local government district with the status of borough in Northern Ireland. It merged with Lisburn City Council in May 2015 under local government reorganisation in Northern Ireland to become Lisburn and Castlereagh City Council, with a small amount being transferred to Belfast City Council.

It was a mainly urban borough consisting mostly of suburbs of Belfast in the Castlereagh Hills (to the south-east of the city) with a small rural area in the south of the borough. Unusually, it had no natural borough centre. The main centres of population are Carryduff, 6 miles (9.6 km) south of Belfast city centre and Dundonald, 5 miles (8 km) east of it.

Castlereagh was named after the barony of Castlereagh, which in turn was named after the townland of same name (from the Irish An Caisleán Riabhach, or Grey Castle, a reference to a stronghold of the Clandeboye O'Neils which stood on a site near what is now an Orange hall on Church Road).

== Creation ==
The district was one of twenty-six created on 1 October 1973. It was formed by the amalgamation of the following areas of County Down: most of Castlereagh Rural District, the Carryduff and Newtownbreda areas of Hillsborough Rural District and the Moneyreagh area of North Down Rural District.

== Borough council ==
Map of the borough's DEAs from 1993 to 2014

The borough was divided into four electoral areas: Castlereagh Central, South, East and West. In the 2011 elections, 23 members were elected. As of February 2012 the political composition of the council was: 11 Democratic Unionist Party (DUP), 6 Alliance Party, 3 Ulster Unionist Party (UUP), 2 Social Democratic and Labour Party (SDLP) and 1 Green Party councillor. The last election was due to take place in May 2009, but on 25 April 2008, Shaun Woodward, Secretary of State for Northern Ireland announced that the scheduled 2009 district council elections were to be postponed until the introduction of the eleven new councils in 2011. The proposed reforms were abandoned in 2010, and the most recent district council elections took place in 2011

=== Mayor of Castlereagh ===
In 1977 Castlereagh District Council was granted a charter of incorporation constituting the district as a borough, and creating the office of mayor.

The mayor for the civic year 2013–2014 was councillor David Drysdale (DUP) and the Deputy Mayor was councillor Ann-Marie Beattie (DUP).

== Parliamentary and assembly representation ==
The borough was divided between the East Belfast constituency (the wards of Ballyhanwood, Carrowreagh, Cregagh, Downshire, Dundonald, Enler, Gilnahirk, Graham's Bridge, Lisnasharragh, Lower Braniel, Tullycarnet and Upper Braniel), the South Belfast constituency (Beechill, Cairnshill, Carryduff East, Carryduff West, Galwally, Hillfoot, Knockbracken, Minnowburn, Newtownbreda and Wynchurch wards) and the Strangford constituency (Moneyreagh ward) for elections to the Westminster Parliament and Northern Ireland Assembly.

== Elections 2011 ==
These elections saw the political landscape at Castlereagh change dramatically. The DUP lost overall control of the council due to the loss of two council seats, one in Central and one in the East. The UUP also lost their sole representative in East. The Alliance Party gained one in East and Central, while the Green Party also gained in East. There were no changes in the West or South areas. There had been much speculation that demographic change would deliver Sinn Féin a seat in South. However, this turned out to be unfounded, with the SDLP being the sixth placed runner up, being narrowly beaten by the UUP for the fifth seat.

== Population ==
The area covered by the former Castlereagh Borough Council had a population of 67,272 residents according to the 2011 Northern Ireland census.

== Freedom of the Borough ==
The following people and military units have received the Freedom of the Borough of Castlereagh.

=== Individuals ===
- George Best: 2002.
- Peter Robinson: 2003.

=== Military Units ===
- The Ulster Defence Regiment: 1984.
- The Ulster Special Constabulary Association: 1992.
- The Regimental Association of the Ulster Defence Regiment: 1994.
- The Royal Irish Regiment: 1995.
- The Royal British Legion: 1996.
- The 204 (North Irish) Field Hospital Royal Army Medical Corps (Volunteers): 28 June 1998.
- The Royal Ulster Constabulary GC: 2000.
- The Northern Ireland Prison Service: 2004.
- The 152 (North Irish) Regiment RLC (Volunteers): 25 May 2013.
- The 152 Royal Electrical and Mechanical Engineers Workshops: 25 May 2013.
- The Police Service of Northern Ireland: December 2014.

== See also ==
- Local government in Northern Ireland

== Further References ==
Bow, John. 2011. Castlereagh, Enlightenment War and Tyranny. Quercus. ISBN 978-0-85738-186-6
