= 2023 Northern Ireland local elections =

- 18 May 2023

All 11 districts, 462 council seats
- Turnout: 54.7% (▲2.0%)
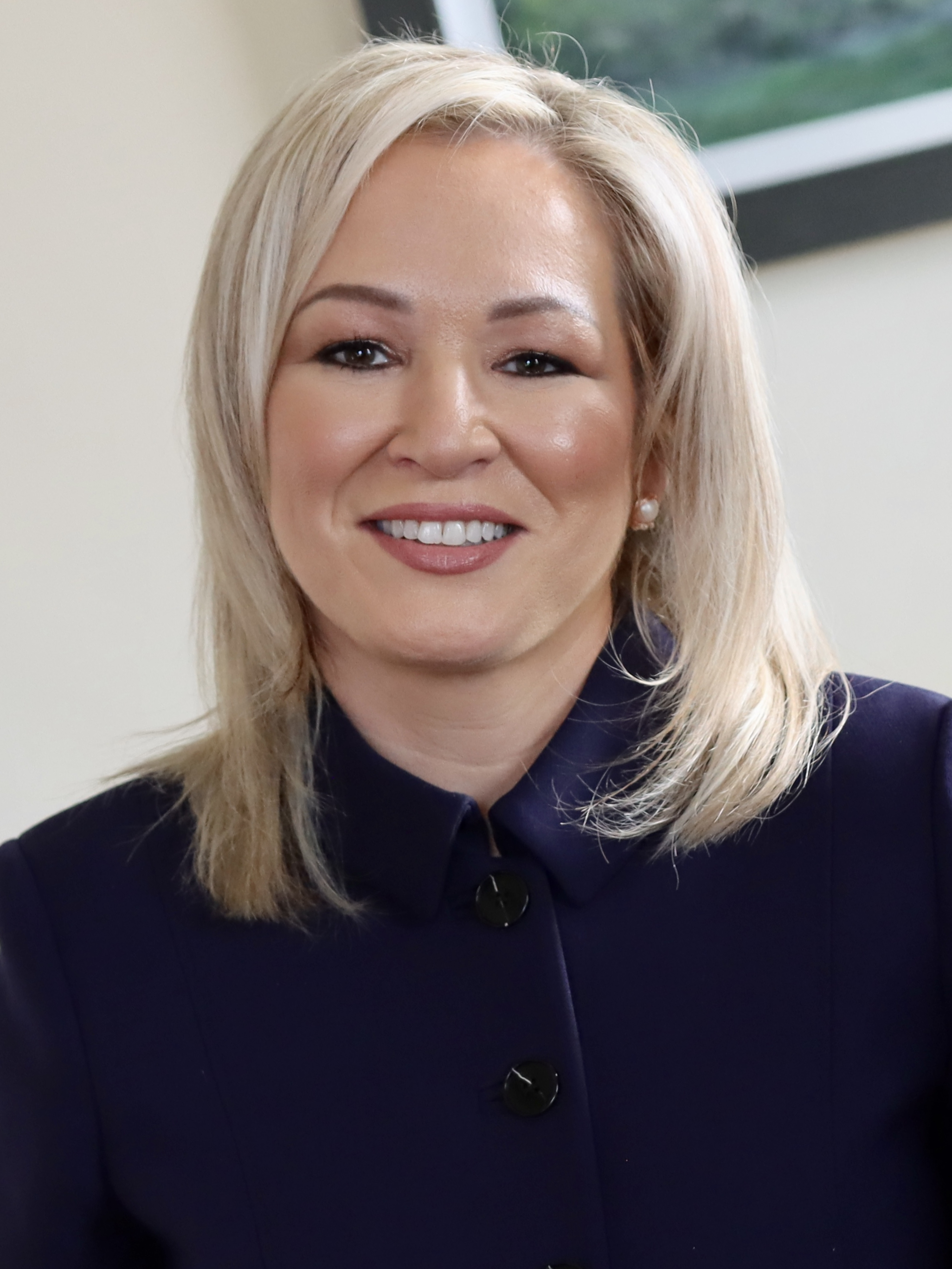

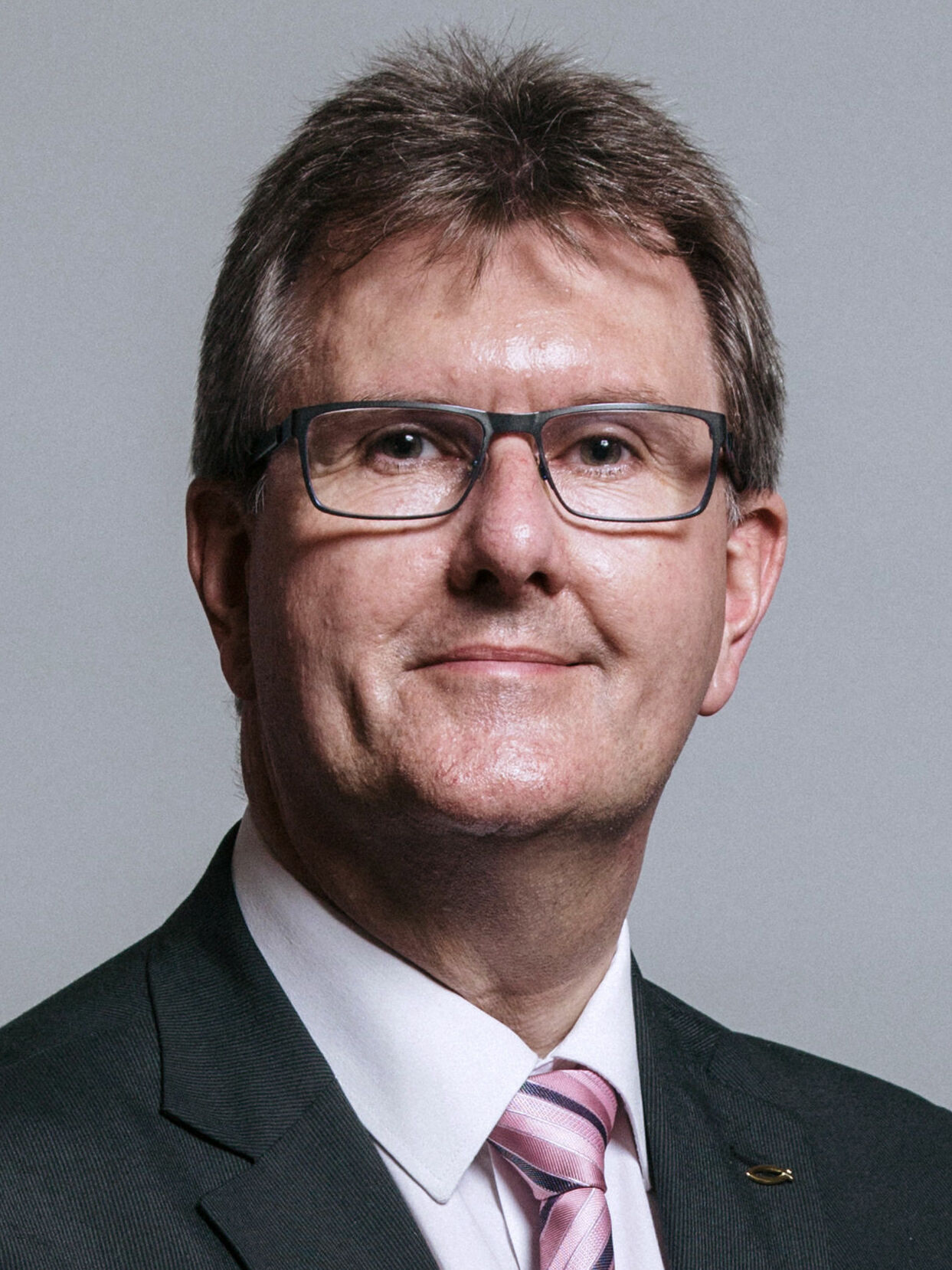

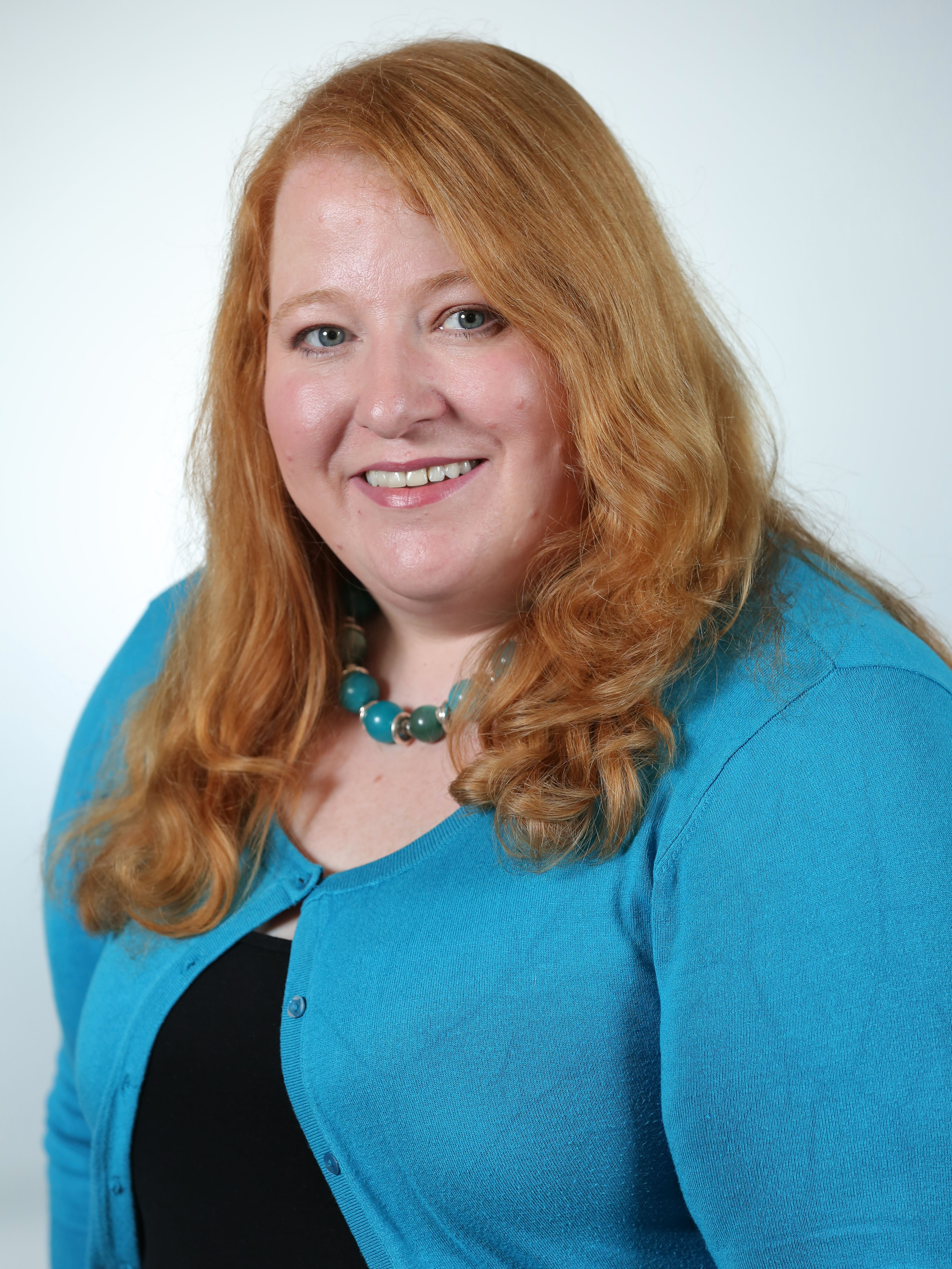

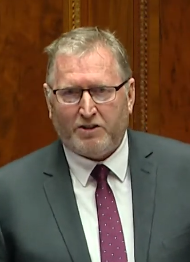

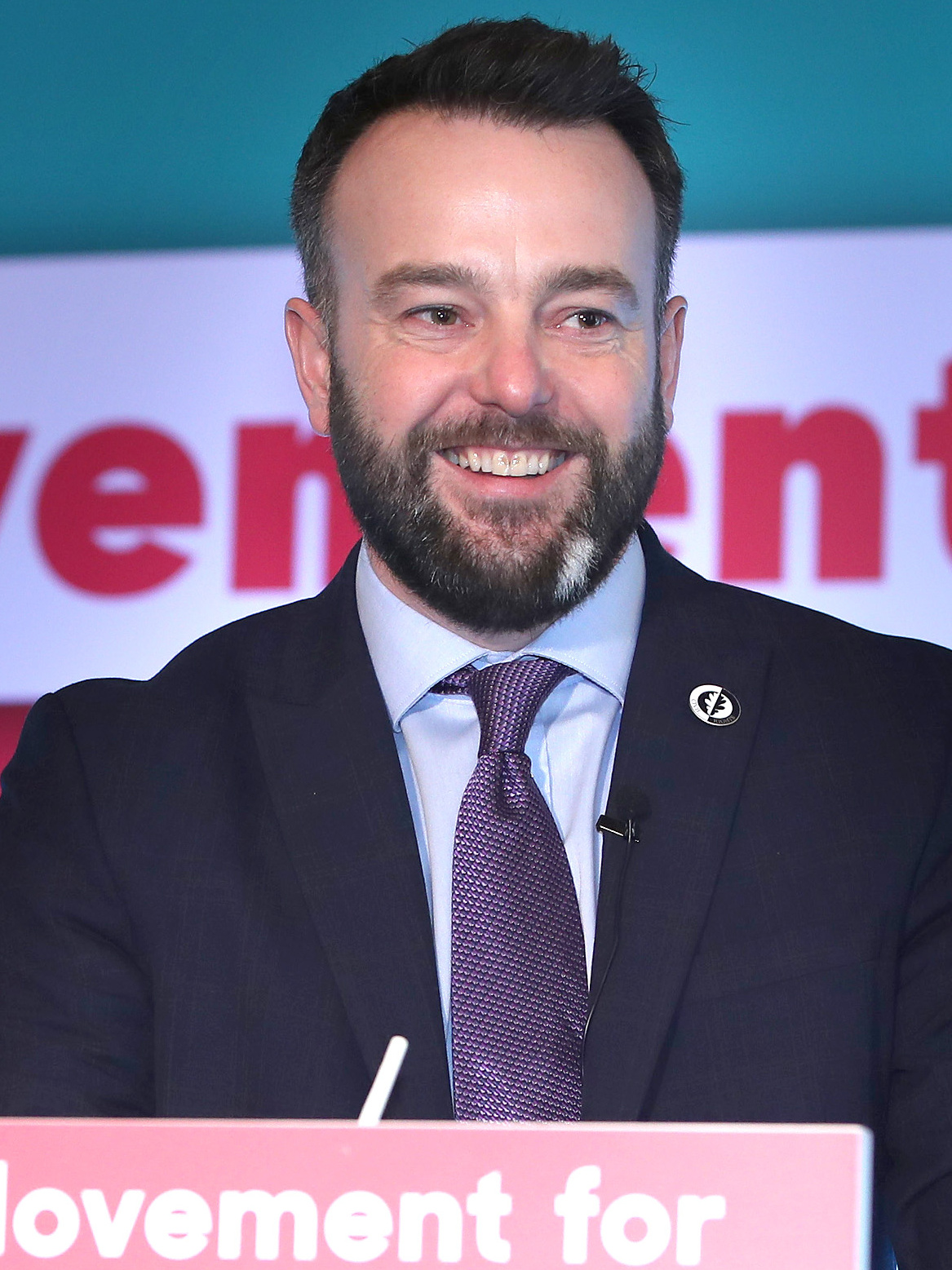

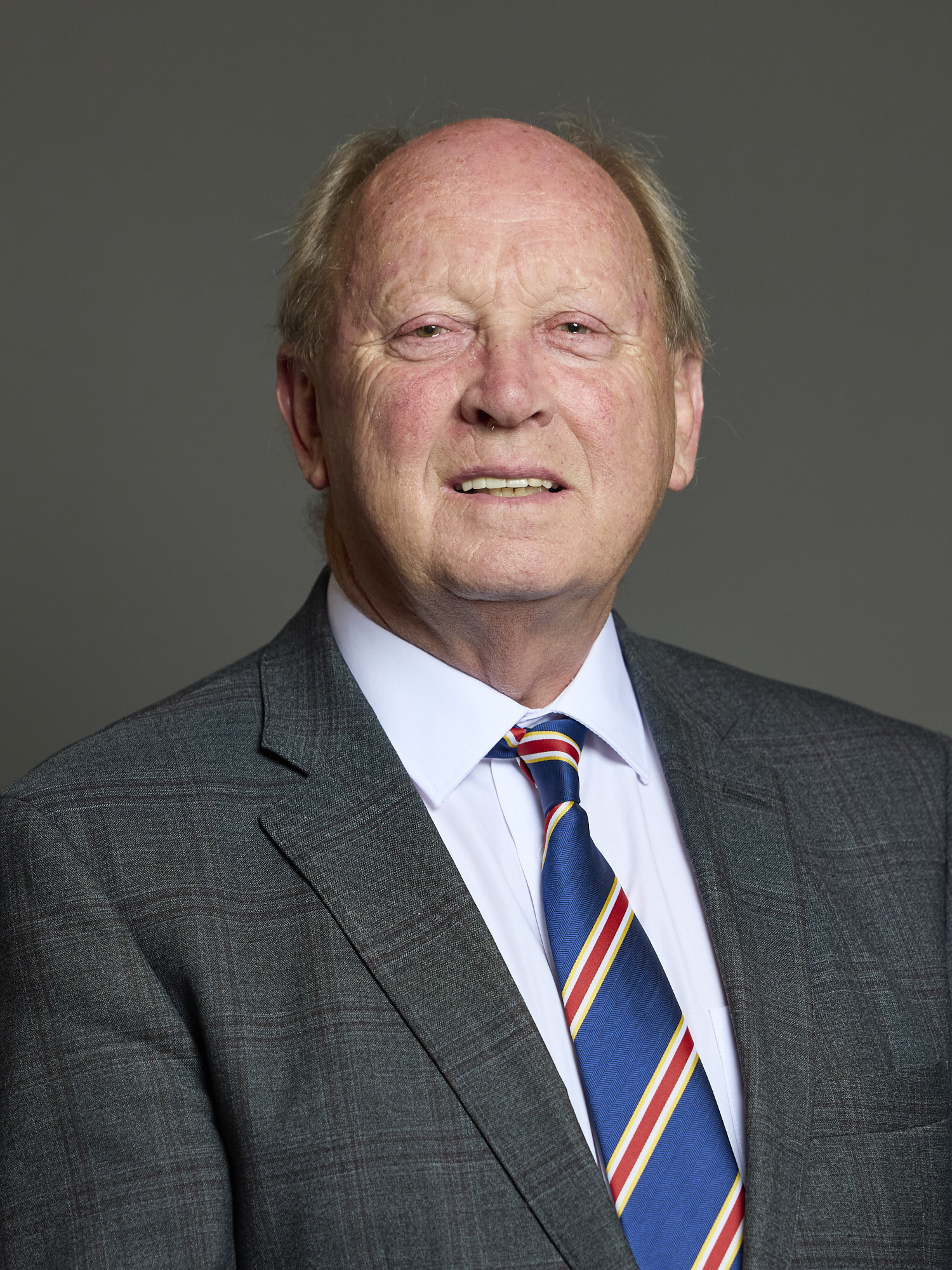

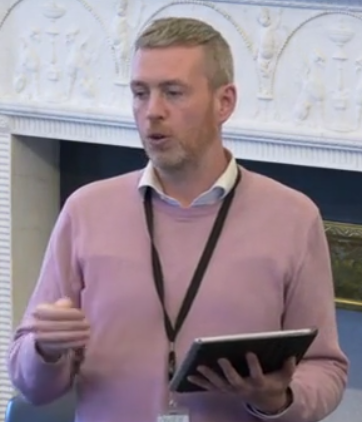

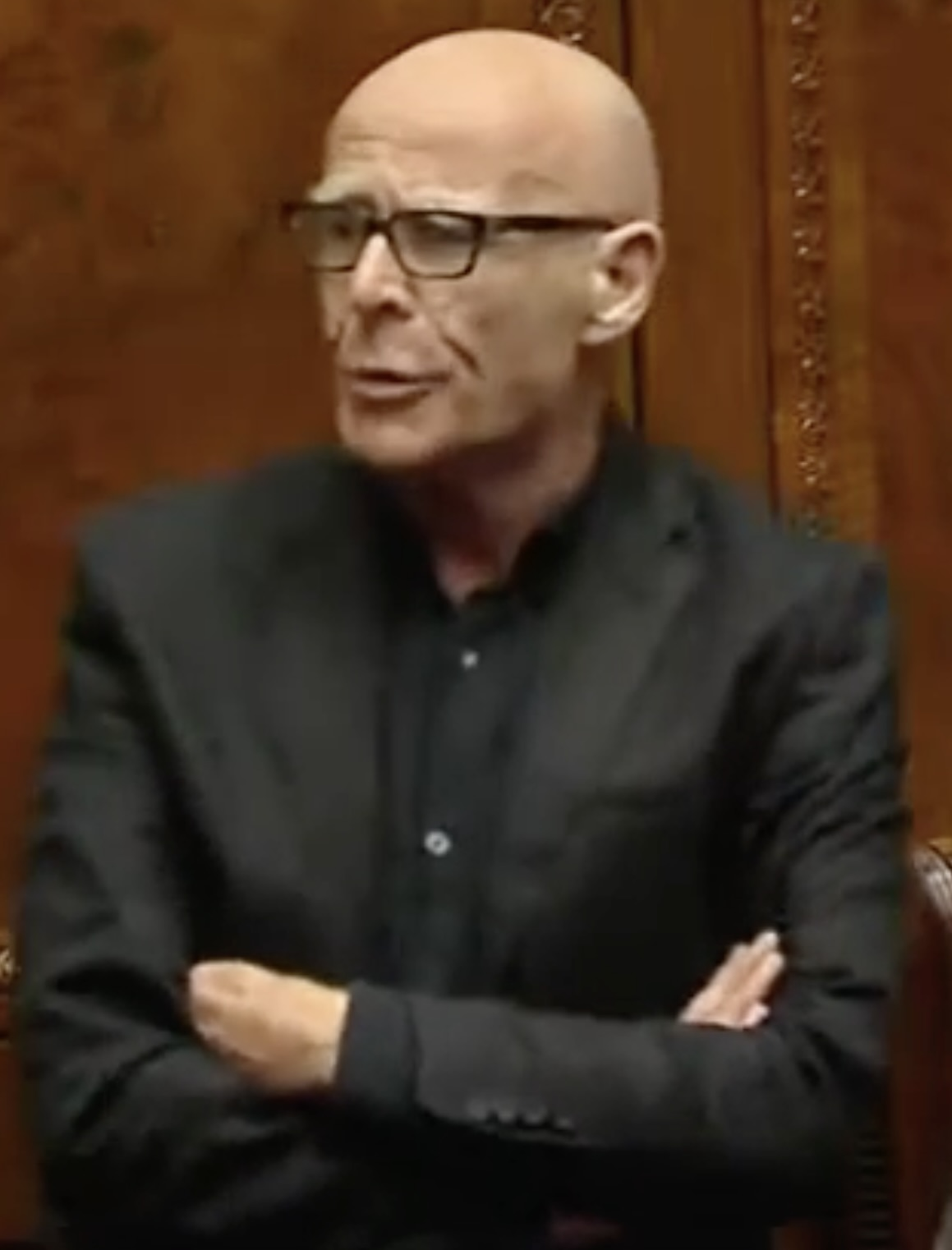
	First party	Second party	Third party
Leader	Michelle O'Neill (Note: The leader of Sinn Féin is Mary Lou McDonald, who sits as a TD in the Irish Dáil Éireann for Dublin Central. O'Neill is the leader of the party in Northern Ireland.)	Jeffrey Donaldson	Naomi Long
Party	Sinn Féin	DUP	Alliance
Last election	105	122	53
Seats won	144	122	67
Seat change	▲39	Steady	▲14
Popular vote	230,793	173,033	99,251
Percentage	30.9%	23.3%	13.3%
Swing	▲7.7%	▼0.8%	▲1.8%
	Fourth party	Fifth party	Sixth party
Leader	Doug Beattie	Colum Eastwood	Jim Allister
Party	UUP	SDLP	TUV
Last election	75	59	6
Seats won	54	39	9
Seat change	▼21	▼20	▲3
Popular vote	81,282	64,996	29,202
Percentage	10.9%	8.7%	3.9%
Swing	▼3.2%	▼3.3%	▲1.7%
	Seventh party	Eighth party	Ninth party
			PUP
Leader	Mal O'Hara	Eamonn McCann (Note: People Before Profit has a collective leadership but for the purposes of registration to the UK Electoral Commission Eamonn McCann is registered as the party's leader in Northern Ireland.)	Billy Hutchinson
Party	Green (NI)	People Before Profit	PUP
Last election	8	5	3
Seats won	5	2	1
Seat change	▼3	▼3	▼2
Popular vote	12,692	8,059	2,103
Percentage	1.7%	1.0%	0.3%
Swing	▼0.4%	▼0.4%	▼0.5%
- Results by DEA (District Electoral Area)

Local elections were held in Northern Ireland on 18 May 2023. The elections were delayed by two weeks to avoid overlapping with the coronation of King Charles III. Following the elections, Sinn Féin became the largest party in local government for the first time. It also marked the first time that nationalist parties had garnered a greater share of the vote than unionist parties.

== Electoral system ==
Northern Ireland uses the single transferable vote (STV) electoral system to elect members of local councils and members of the Northern Ireland Assembly. Voters rank candidates in order of preference by marking 1, 2, 3, etc. to the names of candidates on a ballot paper and can rank as many or as few candidates as they like or just vote for one candidate.

These were the second Northern Irish elections and the first local election at which people were able to register to vote online.

== Background ==
In previous local elections, a unionist party had always won the most seats. In the 2019 Northern Ireland local elections, the Democratic Unionist Party (DUP) had come first.

At the 2022 Northern Ireland Assembly election, Sinn Féin became the biggest political party in the Assembly for the first time. It was also the first time that the DUP didn't assume the position of First Minister-designate since 2007. Due to the terms outlined in the Good Friday Agreement, the largest nationalist party and the largest unionist party must be in government together. The Executive, Northern Ireland's government, was not currently sitting as the DUP had refused to enter government due to the Northern Ireland Protocol, an agreement between the European Union (EU) and the United Kingdom (UK) that governs the unique customs and immigration issues at the border between Republic of Ireland and Northern Ireland. This move had proved controversial, with the Vice President of Sinn Féin and First Minister-designate, Michelle O'Neill saying that it's "totally unacceptable" for the DUP to refuse to enter the Executive amid a crisis. The Social Democratic and Labour Party (SDLP) had accused the DUP of treating voters with contempt and "making our electoral process look like a bad joke" and Naomi Long, leader of the Alliance Party, said DUP Assembly Members should not be allowed to claim their salary while they prevented the Assembly from functioning.

=== Number of candidates ===
The full list of candidates was revealed on 18 May 2023.

Council	SF	DUP	APNI	UUP	SDLP	Ind.	TUV	GRN	AON	PBP	WP	NIC	PUP	CCLA	IRSP	SP	Total
Antrim & Newtownabbey	11	16	10	10	4	3	5	6	1	—	—	1	1	—	—	—	68
Ards & North Down	—	17	16	9	3	11	6	7	—	—	—	3	—	—	—	—	73
Armagh, Banbridge & Craigavon	16	15	7	12	9	1	4	—	1	—	—	—	—	—	—	—	65
Belfast	26	18	18	7	11	4	6	10	2	8	6	1	1	—	2	1	121
Causeway Coast & Glens	13	16	8	10	7	8	4	2	4	1	—	—	1	—	—	—	74
Derry & Strabane	18	7	7	5	15	6	—	—	5	7	—	—	—	—	—	—	70
Fermanagh & Omagh	22	9	7	9	7	6	2	—	—	—	—	—	—	1	—	1	64
Lisburn & Castlereagh	6	18	14	12	6	3	3	3	—	—	—	—	—	—	—	—	65
Mid & East Antrim	4	17	10	12	2	2	10	3	—	—	—	—	1	—	—	—	61
Mid-Ulster	21	11	5	7	7	6	5	—	3	—	—	—	—	1	—	—	66
Newry, Mourne & Down	24	8	8	8	15	6	1	6	3	—	1	—	—	—	—	—	80
Total	162	152	110	101	86	56	46	37	19	16	7	5	4	2	2	2	807

== Opinion polling ==
Date(s) conducted	Pollster	Client	Sample size	DUP ^{U}	SF ^{N}	APNI ^{O}	UUP ^{U}	SDLP ^{N}	TUV ^{U}	Green ^{O}	Other	Lead
18 May 2023	2023 local elections		N/A	23.3%	30.9%	13.3%	10.9%	8.7%	3.9%	1.7%	7.2%	7.6%
11–21 Apr 2023	Institute of Irish Studies	University of Liverpool/Irish News	1,013	23%	29.8%	14.5%	12.8%	8.3%	5.0%	2.7%	4.9%	6.8%
3 May 2019	2019 local elections		N/A	24.1%	23.2%	11.5%	14.1%	12.0%	2.2%	2.1%	8.2%	0.9%

In the table above, U signifies unionist, N nationalist and O other.

== Results ==
The counting of votes began on 19 May 2023 and finished on 21 May 2023. Preliminary results showed Sinn Féin overtaking the DUP as the largest party in local government. In one DEA, Waterside in Derry and Strabane, the result was incorrectly declared prematurely and the counting of votes was not completed; the counting of votes there resumed on 9 August 2023.

As is common in Northern Ireland under the single transferable vote electoral system, ten of the eleven councils were under no overall control. The exception was Fermanagh and Omagh District Council where Sinn Féin won 21 seats to take a majority of two, becoming the only single party with control of a district council.

Results were published by BBC News.

=== Results by council ===
Council	SF (N)		DUP (U)		APNI (O)		UUP (U)		SDLP (N)		TUV (U)		Green (O)		PBP (O)		PUP (U)		Ind.		Total	U		N		O		Control
Antrim & Newtownabbey	9	▲4	13	▼1	8	▲1	7	▼2	1	▼3	—		—		—		—		2	▲1	40	20	▼3	10	▲1	10	▲2	NOC
Ards & North Down	—		14	Steady	12	▲2	8	Steady	1	Steady	0	▼1	2	▼1	—		—		3	Steady	40	24	▼1	1	Steady	15	▲1	Un.
Armagh, Banbridge & Craigavon	15	▲5	13	▲2	4	▲1	6	▼4	1	▼5	1	▲1	—		—		—		1	Steady	41	21	▼1	16	Steady	4	▲1	Un.
Belfast	22	▲4	14	▼1	11	▲1	2	Steady	5	▼1	1	▲1	3	▼1	1	▼2	0	▼2	1	▲1	60	17	▼2	28	▲4	15	▼2	NOC
Causeway Coast & Glens	12	▲3	13	▼1	5	▲3	4	▼3	3	▼3	2	▲2	—		—		1	Steady	—	▼1	40	20	▼2	15	Steady	5	▲3	NOC
Derry & Strabane	18	▲7	5	▼2	0	▼2	3	▲1	10	▼1	—		—		1	▼1	—		3	▼1	40	8	▼1	31	▲4	1	▼3	Nat.
Fermanagh & Omagh	21	▲6	6	▲1	2	▲1	7	▼2	3	▼2	—		—		—		—		1	▼3	40	13	▼1	25	▲1	2	Steady	Nat.
Lisburn & Castlereagh	4	▲2	14	▼1	13	▲4	6	▼5	2	Steady	—		0	▼1	—		—		1	▲1	40	21	▼5	6	▲2	13	▲3	Un.
Mid & East Antrim	4	▲2	14	▼1	7	Steady	8	▲1	0	▼1	5	Steady	—		—		—		2	▼1	40	29	▼1	4	▲1	7	Steady	Un.
Mid-Ulster	19	▲2	11	▲2	—		2	▼4	5	Steady	—		—		—		—		3	▲1	40	13	▼2	27	▲2	0	Steady	Nat.
Newry, Mourne & Down	20	▲4	5	▲2	5	▲3	1	▼3	8	▼3	—		—		—		—		2	▼3	41	6	▼2	30	Steady	5	▲2	Nat.
Total	144	▲39	122	Steady	67	▲14	54	▼21	39	▼20	9	▲3	5	▼3	2	▼3	1	▼2	19	▼5	462	192	▼21	193	▲15	77	▲7	

The 11 council areas across Northern Ireland.

=== Largest party by council ===
Map key	Council	Seats	Largest party (no. of seats)		Details
Map key	Council	Seats	2019	2023	Details
1	Belfast	60	Sinn Féin (18)	Sinn Féin (22)	Details
2	Ards & North Down	40	DUP (14) (Note: Reduced to 12 due to defections.)	DUP (14)	Details
3	Antrim & Newtownabbey	40	DUP (14)	DUP (13)	Details
4	Lisburn & Castlereagh	40	DUP (15) (Note: Reduced to 14 due to defections.)	DUP (14)	Details
5	Newry, Mourne & Down	41	Sinn Féin (16)	Sinn Féin (20)	Details
6	Armagh City, Banbridge and Craigavon	41	DUP (11)	Sinn Féin (15)	Details
7	Mid & East Antrim	40	DUP (15) (Note: Increased to 16 due to defections)	DUP (14)	Details
8	Causeway Coast & Glens	40	DUP (14) (Note: Reduced to 13 due to defections.)	DUP (13)	Details
9	Mid Ulster	40	Sinn Féin (17)	Sinn Féin (19)	Details
10	Derry City & Strabane	40	Sinn Féin (11)	Sinn Féin (18)	Details
10	Derry City & Strabane	40	SDLP (11)	Sinn Féin (18)	Details
11	Fermanagh & Omagh	40	Sinn Féin (15)	Sinn Féin (21*)	Details
All Councils in Northern Ireland		462	DUP (122)	Sinn Féin (144)	

- *Absolute Majority

=== Results by party ===
Party	Councillors			% of councillors			First preference votes			% of FP votes		
Party	2019	2023	+/-	2019	2023	+/-	2019	2023	+/-	2019	2023	+/-
Sinn Féin	105	144	▲39	22.7%	31.2%	▲8.5%	157,448	230,793	▲73,345	23.2%	30.9%	▲7.7%
DUP	122	122	0	26.4%	26.4%	0.0%	163,615	173,033	▲9,418	24.1%	23.3%	▼0.8%
Alliance	53	67	▲14	11.5%	14.5%	▲3.0%	78,052	99,251	▲21,199	11.5%	13.3%	▲1.8%
UUP	75	54	▼21	16.2%	11.7%	▼4.5%	95,320	81,282	▼14,038	14.1%	10.9%	▼3.2%
SDLP	59	39	▼20	12.8%	8.4%	▼4.4%	81,419	64,996	▼16,423	12.0%	8.7%	▼3.3%
Independent	24	19	▼5	5.2%	4.1%	▼1.1%	29,339	34,396	▲5,057	4.3%	4.6%	▲0.3%
TUV	6	9	▲3	1.3%	1.9%	▲0.6%	15,165	29,202	▲14,037	2.2%	3.9%	▲1.7%
Green (NI)	8	5	▼3	1.7%	1.1%	▼0.6%	14,284	12,692	▼1,592	2.1%	1.7%	▼0.4%
People Before Profit	5	2	▼3	1.1%	0.4%	▼0.7%	9,478	8,059	▼1,419	1.4%	1.0%	▼0.4%
PUP	3	1	▼2	0.6%	0.2%	▼0.4%	5,338	2,103	▼3,235	0.8%	0.3%	▼0.5%
Aontú	1	0	▼1	0.2%	0.0%	▼0.2%	7,459	6,771	▼688	1.1%	0.9%	▼0.2%
Labour Alternative	1	0	▼1	0.2%	0.0%	▼0.2%	880	772	▼108	0.1%	0.1%	0.0%
Irish Republican Socialist	0	0	Steady	0.0%	0.0%	Steady	N/A	825	▲825	N/A	0.1%	N/A
NI Conservatives	0	0	Steady	0.0%	0.0%	Steady	1,364	438	▼926	0.2%	0.1%	▼0.1%
Workers' Party	0	0	Steady	0.0%	0.0%	Steady	N/A	678	▲678	N/A	0.1%	N/A
Socialist Party	0	0	Steady	0.0%	0.0%	Steady	N/A	224	▲224	N/A	0.0%	N/A
Total	462	462	Steady	100.0%	100.0%	Steady	663,916	745,515				

== Councils ==
=== Antrim and Newtownabbey ===
Airport
Party	Candidate	1st pref.
DUP	Matthew Magill	1,827
Sinn Féin	Anne-Marie Logue	1,574
Sinn Féin	Maighréad Ní Chonghaile	1,335
Alliance	Andrew McAuley	1,209
UUP	Paul Michael	1,075
SDLP	Thomas Burns	862
Green (NI)	Terri Johnston	134
Turnout		8,016
Sinn Féin gain from SDLP		

Antrim
Party	Candidate	1st pref.
Sinn Féin	Lucille O'Hagan	1,270
Alliance	Neil Kelly	1,091
DUP	Paul Dunlop	986
UUP	Leah Smyth	744
DUP	John Smyth	721
SDLP	Roisin Lynch	678
TUV	Richard Shields	453
UUP	Jim Montgomery	442
Alliance	Tommy Monahan	396
DUP	Karl McMeekin	257
Green (NI)	Eleanor Bailey	88
Turnout		7,126
Sinn Féin gain from UUP		

Ballyclare
Party	Candidate	1st pref.
DUP	Jeannie Archibald	1,655
UUP	Vera McWilliam	1,131
Alliance	Lewis Boyle	977
DUP	Helen Magill	947
Independent	Michael Stewart	928
TUV	Mel Lucas	747
UUP	Norrie Ramsey	604
Green (NI)	Robert Robinson	109
Sinn Féin	Gerard Magee	86
Turnout		7,184
Alliance gain from UUP		

Dunsilly
Party	Candidate	1st pref.
Sinn Féin	Henry Cushinan	1,390
Sinn Féin	Annie O'Lone	1,214
DUP	Linda Clarke	977
Alliance	Jay Burbank	913
UUP	Stewart Wilson	843
SDLP	Ryan Wilson	724
DUP	Tom Cunningham	705
TUV	Jonathan Campbell	445
Aontú	Siobhán McErlean	243
Turnout		7,454
Sinn Féin gain from SDLP		

Glengormley Urban
Party	Candidate	1st pref.
DUP	Alison Bennington	1,432
Sinn Féin	Eamonn McLaughlin	1,280
Alliance	Julian McGrath	994
Sinn Féin	Rosie Kinnear	972
UUP	Mark Cosgrove	952
DUP	Paula Bradley	852
Sinn Féin	Michael Goodman	841
SDLP	Noreen McClelland	565
Alliance	Anita Piatek	413
Green (NI)	Paul Veronica	313
Independent	Michael Maguire	102
NI Conservatives	Jason Reid	49
Turnout		8,765
Sinn Féin gain from SDLP		

Macedon
Party	Candidate	1st pref.
Sinn Féin	Taylor McGrann	1,326
DUP	Matthew Brady	1,220
UUP	Robert Foster	1,138
Alliance	Billy Webb	1,085
DUP	Ben Mallon	574
DUP	Victor Robinson	553
Independent	Stafford Ward	487
TUV	Norman Boyd	333
PUP	Rosemary Bell-McCracken	244
Green (NI)	Ellie Byrne	158
Turnout		7,118
Independent gain from DUP		

Three Mile Water
Party	Candidate	1st pref.
DUP	Mark Cooper	1,575
Alliance	Tom Campbell	1,390
DUP	Stephen Ross	1,211
UUP	Stephen Cosgrove	899
Alliance	Julie Gilmour	711
DUP	Sam Flanagan	574
UUP	Brian Kerr	530
TUV	Trevor Mawhinney	425
Sinn Féin	Emmanuel Mullen	325
Green (NI)	Dylan Loughlin	162
Turnout		7,802
No change

=== Ards and North Down ===
Ards Peninsula
Party	Candidate	1st pref.
DUP	Robert Adair	1,959
SDLP	Joe Boyle	1,279
Alliance	Lorna McAlpine	1,266
Sinn Féin	Noel Sands	945
DUP	Davy Kerr	827
UUP	Pete Wray	739
DUP	Eddie Thompson	687
DUP	Nigel Edmund	633
TUV	Tom Thompson	592
Green (NI)	Gillian McNaull	149
Independent	Boyd Ireland	108
Turnout		9,184
No change

Bangor Central
Party	Candidate	1st pref.
Alliance	Karen Douglas	1,378
Independent	Wesley Irvine	1,369
DUP	Alistair Cathcart	1,053
UUP	Craig Blaney	917
Independent	Ray McKimm	885
Alliance	Chris McCracken	666
Green (NI)	Stephen Dunlop	583
TUV	Peter Wilson	454
Alliance	Alex Harbinson	385
DUP	Dean McSorley	361
UUP	Rachel McCord	313
NI Conservatives	Tim Mullen	86
Turnout		8,450
Wesley Irvine leaves DUP		
Alliance gain from Green		

Bangor East and Donaghadee
Party	Candidate	1st pref.
UUP	Mark Brooks	1,972
Alliance	Hannah Irwin	1,445
DUP	James Cochrane	1,275
UUP	David Chambers	932
DUP	Janice MacArthur	712
Independent	Bill Keery	641
Alliance	Gillian McCollum	585
Independent	Tom Smith	460
Green (NI)	Ciara Henry	355
NI Conservatives	Paul Leeman	119
Turnout		8,496
Alliance gain from Independent		

Bangor West
Party	Candidate	1st pref.
Alliance	Christine Chrighton	1,175
DUP	Jennifer Gilmour	1,033
UUP	Stephen Hollywood	867
Green (NI)	Barry McKee	737
DUP	Peter Martin	640
Independent	Susan Prentice	510
Alliance	Huw Stacy	395
Alliance	Alison McWhinney	388
TUV	John Gordon	331
SDLP	Tony McCann	297
NI Conservatives	Colin Breen	132
Turnout		6,505
DUP gain from Alliance		

Comber
Party	Candidate	1st pref.
DUP	Libby Douglas	1,501
UUP	Philip Smith	1,407
DUP	Trevor Cummings	1,303
Alliance	Patricia Morgan	1,081
Alliance	Rachel Ashe	1,019
TUV	Sam Patterson	409
Independent	Stephen Cooper	322
Green (NI)	Cory Quinn	197
Independent	John Sloan	47
Turnout		7,286
Alliance gain from TUV		

Holywood and Clandeboye
Party	Candidate	1st pref.
Alliance	Martin McRandal	1,222
Green (NI)	Rachel Woods	1,134
DUP	Alan Graham	1,112
Alliance	David Rossiter	1,074
UUP	Linzi McLaren	989
Alliance	Helen Corbett	875
SDLP	Déirdre Vaughan	539
DUP	Carl McClean	419
TUV	Diane Adams	364
Turnout		7,728
No change

Newtownards
Party	Candidate	1st pref.
Independent	Steven Irvine	1,463
DUP	Naomi Armstrong	1,370
UUP	Richard Smart	1,257
Alliance	Alan McDowell	1,236
DUP	Stephen McIlveen	1,057
Alliance	Vicky Moore	947
TUV	Eddie Allen	598
DUP	Colin Kennedy	580
Independent	Ian Cox	527
Green (NI)	Maurice Macartney	226
Independent	Ben King	24
Turnout		9,285
No change

=== Armagh, Banbridge and Craigavon ===
Armagh
Party	Candidate	1st pref.
Sinn Féin	Fergal Donnelly	2,158
DUP	Scott Armstrong	1,924
Sinn Féin	Ashley Mallon	1,661
SDLP	Thomas O'Hanlon	1,654
Sinn Féin	John Óg O'Kane	1,508
Sinn Féin	Sarah Duffy	1,409
UUP	Sam Nicholson	1,328
SDLP	Gráinne O'Neill	966
Alliance	Hanagh Winter	619
Aontú	Daniel Connolly	357
Turnout		13,584
Sinn Féin gain from SDLP		
DUP gain from UUP		

Banbridge
Party	Candidate	1st pref.
Alliance	Joy Ferguson	1,961
UUP	Glenn Barr	1,903
Sinn Féin	Chris McCartan	1,750
DUP	Paul Greenfield	1,747
Sinn Féin	Kevin Savage	1,595
DUP	Ian Wilson	1,296
UUP	Jill Macauley	1,055
UUP	Ian Burns	984
SDLP	Seamus Doyle	787
TUV	Brian Moorhead	593
Turnout		13,671
Sinn Féin gain from UUP		

Craigavon
Party	Candidate	1st pref.
Sinn Féin	Jude Mallon	1,964
Sinn Féin	Catherine Nelson	1,897
DUP	Margaret Tinsley	1,811
Alliance	Robbie Alexander	1,392
DUP	Ian Patterson	1,360
UUP	Kate Evans	1,305
SDLP	Declan McAlinden	762
SDLP	Jackie Coade	196
Turnout		10,757
Sinn Féin gain from SDLP		
Alliance gain from SDLP		

Cusher
Party	Candidate	1st pref.
Sinn Féin	Brona Haughey	2,177
Independent	Paul Berry	2,059
TUV	Keith Ratcliffe	2,037
DUP	Gareth Wilson	1,912
DUP	Philip Weir	1,380
UUP	Gordon Kennedy	1,099
Alliance	Mark Skillen	594
SDLP	Emma Jayne McKernan	578
UUP	Ewan McNeill	442
Turnout		12,278
TUV gain from UUP		

Lagan River
Party	Candidate	1st pref.
DUP	Mark Baxter	2,261
Alliance	Jessica Johnston	1,762
DUP	Paul Rankin	1,505
UUP	Kyle Savage	1,393
DUP	Tim McClelland	1,137
TUV	Samuel Morrison	627
UUP	Sammy Ogle	593
Sinn Féin	Vincent McAleenan	502
SDLP	Oisín Edwards	220
Turnout		10,000
No change

Lurgan
Party	Candidate	1st pref.
Sinn Féin	Keith Haughian	2,153
Alliance	Peter Lavery	1,877
DUP	Peter Haire	1,849
Sinn Féin	Liam Mackle	1,835
Sinn Féin	Mary O'Dowd	1,554
DUP	Stephen Moutray	1,416
Sinn Féin	Sorchá McGeown	1,299
UUP	Louise McKinstry	1,104
SDLP	Ciaran Toman	991
Turnout		14,078
Sinn Féin gain from SDLP		
DUP gain from UUP		

Portadown
Party	Candidate	1st pref.
Sinn Féin	Paul Duffy	1,986
DUP	Lavelle McIlwrath	1,826
DUP	Kyle Moutray	1,816
DUP	Alan Mulholland	1,432
UUP	Julie Flaherty	1,355
Alliance	Emma Hutchinson	921
Sinn Féin	Clare McConville-Walker	907
SDLP	Eamonn McNeill	842
TUV	Robert Oliver	795
UUP	Zöe McCullough	322
Turnout		12,202
Sinn Féin gain from SDLP		

=== Belfast ===
Balmoral
Party	Candidate	1st pref.
Sinn Féin	Geraldine McAteer	2,037
SDLP	Dónal Lyons	1,616
Alliance	Tara Brooks	1,522
DUP	Sarah Bunting	1,513
Alliance	Micky Murray	1,090
DUP	Gareth Spratt	817
UUP	Joshua Lowry	551
Sinn Féin	Séan Napier	427
Green (NI)	Lauren Kendall	333
SDLP	Sarah Mulgrew	323
Turnout		10,229
Alliance gain from DUP		

Black Mountain
Party	Candidate	1st pref.
Sinn Féin	Ciarán Beattie	2,336
Sinn Féin	Micheal Donnelly	2,158
Sinn Féin	Arder Carson	2,073
Sinn Féin	Áine McCabe	1,838
SDLP	Paul Doherty	1,685
Sinn Féin	Ronan McLaughlin	1,641
Sinn Féin	Róis-Máire Donnelly	1,536
People Before Profit	Matt Collins	1,316
Aontú	Gerard Herdman	543
Irish Republican Socialist	Dan Murphy	426
Workers' Party	Ursula Meighan	185
Alliance	Ryan Brown	166
Green (NI)	Stevie Maginn	68
Turnout		15,971
SDLP gain from People Before Profit		

Botanic
Party	Candidate	1st pref.
SDLP	Gary McKeown	1,881
Sinn Féin	John Gormley	1,533
DUP	Tracy Kelly	1,372
Alliance	Emmet McDonough-Brown	1,086
Sinn Féin	Emma-Jane Faulkner	1,048
Green (NI)	Áine Groogan	1,006
Alliance	Chris Ogle	728
DUP	Darren Leighton	649
UUP	Jeffrey Dudgeon	380
TUV	Billy Dickson	312
People Before Profit	Sipho Sibanda	308
Socialist Party	Neil Moore	149
Workers' Party	Paddy Lynn	89
NI Conservatives	Idris Maiga	52
Turnout		10,593
No change

Castle
Party	Candidate	1st pref.
Sinn Féin	Brónach Anglin	2,479
Sinn Féin	Conor Maskey	2,068
DUP	Fred Cobain	1,775
DUP	Dean McCullough	1,671
Alliance	Sam Nelson	1,392
SDLP	Carl Whyte	1,047
Green (NI)	Mal O'Hara	979
UUP	Julie-Anne Corr-Johnston	553
People Before Profit	Barney Doherty	250
Workers' Party	Lily Kerr	86
Turnout		12,479
Sinn Féin gain from Green		

Collin
Party	Candidate	1st pref.
Sinn Féin	Joe Duffy	2,559
Sinn Féin	Caoimhín McCann	2,350
Sinn Féin	Matt Garrett	1,924
Sinn Féin	Clíodhna Nic Bhranair	1,649
Sinn Féin	Seanna Walsh	1,521
People Before Profit	Michael Collins	1,193
SDLP	Gerard McDonald	903
Aontú	Luke McCann	526
Alliance	Eoin Millar	492
Independent	Julieann McNally	368
Green (NI)	Ash Jones	228
Independent	Tony Mallon	166
Workers' Party	Paddy Crossan	83
Turnout		13,962
Sinn Féin gain from SDLP		

Court
Party	Candidate	1st pref.
DUP	Frank McCoubrey	2,645
Sinn Féin	Tina Black	1,822
DUP	Nicola Verner	1,783
Sinn Féin	Claire Canavan	1,616
DUP	Ian McLaughlin	993
TUV	Ron McDowell	963
PUP	Billy Hutchinson	679
People Before Profit	Cailín McCaffrey	408
Irish Republican Socialist	Michael Kelly	399
Alliance	Ally Haydock	329
SDLP	Olcan McSparron	175
Green (NI)	Sara Haller	108
Workers' Party	Tony Walls	85
Independent	Geoffrey Wilson	18
Turnout		12,023
TUV gain from PUP		

Lisnasharragh
Party	Candidate	1st pref.
DUP	Davy Douglas	2,083
SDLP	Séamas De Faoite	1,580
Alliance	Michael Long	1,437
Sinn Féin	Stevie Jenkins	1,231
Green (NI)	Brian Smyth	1,157
Alliance	Eric Hanvey	1,078
DUP	Bradley Ferguson	1,060
Alliance	Anna McErlean	961
UUP	Bill Manwaring	820
TUV	Stephen Ferguson	368
People Before Profit	Nick Cropper	200
Turnout		11,975
No change

Oldpark
Party	Candidate	1st pref.
Sinn Féin	Nichola Bradley	1,870
Independent	Paul McCusker	1,747
Sinn Féin	JJ Magee	1,619
Sinn Féin	Ryan Murphy	1,430
Sinn Féin	Tomás Ó Neill	1,330
DUP	Jordan Doran	1,263
DUP	Gillian Simpson	919
People Before Profit	Fiona Ferguson	700
TUV	Ann McClure	595
Alliance	Chris Shannon	453
SDLP	Charlotte Carson	245
Green (NI)	Ange Cruz	149
Workers' Party	Fiona McCarthy	46
Turnout		12,366
Paul McCusker leaves SDLP		
Sinn Féin gain from People Before Profit		

Ormiston
Party	Candidate	1st pref.
Alliance	Christine Bower	2,661
DUP	James Lawlor	2,394
DUP	Andrew McCormick	1,642
Alliance	Ross McMullan	1,480
Alliance	Jenna Maghie	1,299
UUP	Jim Rodgers	1,004
Green (NI)	Anthony Flynn	999
Alliance	Caitlin Sullivan	889
UUP	Carole Howard	847
TUV	John Hiddleston	680
Sinn Féin	Caitríona Mallaghan	174
People Before Profit	Fiona Doran	117
SDLP	Lorcan McGuirk	106
Turnout		14,295
No change

Titanic
Party	Candidate	1st pref.
DUP	Ruth Brooks	1,690
Alliance	David Bell	1,360
Sinn Féin	Padraig Donnelly	1,284
DUP	Sammy Douglas	1,214
Alliance	Fiona McAteer	1,149
UUP	Sonia Copeland	968
Green (NI)	Gillian Hamilton	938
DUP	George Dorrian	658
TUV	Anne Smyth	564
SDLP	Elly Odhiambo	129
Turnout		9,954
Sinn Féin gain from PUP		

=== Causeway Coast and Glens ===
Ballymoney
Party	Candidate	1st pref.
DUP	Mervyn Storey	1,779
Sinn Féin	Ciarán McQuillan	1,320
UUP	Darryl Wilson	1,255
Sinn Féin	Leanne Peacock	1,194
TUV	Jonathan McAuley	995
Alliance	Lee Kane	880
DUP	Alan McLean	861
DUP	Ivor Wallace	808
UUP	Tom McKeown	438
SDLP	Caitlin Bond	286
Independent	Cathal McLaughlin	220
Turnout		9,971
Alliance gain from UUP		
TUV gain from DUP		

Bann
Party	Candidate	1st pref.
Sinn Féin	Sean Bateson	1,277
DUP	Michelle Knight-McQuillan	1,054
Sinn Féin	Ciarán Archibald	862
DUP	Dawn Huggins	851
UUP	Richard Holmes	782
UUP	Andrew Kerr	760
Independent	Adrian McQuillan	701
Alliance	Joe Hutchinson	573
TUV	William Craig	456
Aontú	Gemma Brolly	336
SDLP	Ryan Barkley	173
Green (NI)	Jen McCahon	92
Turnout		7,917
Sinn Féin gain from SDLP		

Benbradagh
Party	Candidate	1st pref.
Sinn Féin	Sean McGlinchey	1,888
Sinn Féin	Dermot Nicholl	1,558
DUP	Edgar Scott	1,231
Sinn Féin	Kathleen McGurk	1,172
UUP	Robert Carmichael	600
Aontú	Liam McElhinney	494
SDLP	Michael Coyle	441
Alliance	Christine Turner	353
Independent	Niall Murphy	116
Turnout		7,853
No change

Causeway
Party	Candidate	1st pref.
DUP	Mark Fielding	1,305
Alliance	Peter McCully	924
DUP	John McAuley	878
TUV	Allister Kyle	867
DUP	Sharon McKillop	860
UUP	Sandra Hunter	793
Sinn Féin	Emma Thompson	715
UUP	Barry Torrens	608
Alliance	Richard Stewart	468
SDLP	Paul Shevlin	450
Independent	David Alexander	354
Independent	Angela Mulholland	327
Green (NI)	Mark Coulson	262
Turnout		8,811
Alliance gain from SDLP		
TUV gain from UUP		

Coleraine
Party	Candidate	1st pref.
DUP	Philip Anderson	1,389
PUP	Russell Watton	1,016
Alliance	Yvonne Boyle	947
Sinn Féin	Niamh Archibald	858
UUP	John Wisener	721
DUP	Adele Tomb	655
Independent	George Duddy	450
DUP	Tanya Stirling	441
TUV	Michael Sweeney	339
SDLP	Helen Maher	329
People Before Profit	Amy Merron	247
Turnout		7,392
Sinn Féin gain from SDLP		

Limavady
Party	Candidate	1st pref.
Sinn Féin	Brenda Chivers	1,800
DUP	Steven Callaghan	1,010
Independent	James McCorkell	562
Alliance	Amy Mairs	547
UUP	Barry Crawford	511
DUP	Aaron Callan	496
DUP	Jordan Wallace	478
SDLP	Ashleen Schenning	443
Aontú	John Boyle	153
Independent	Billy Stewart	31
Turnout		6,031
Alliance gain from DUP		

The Glens
Party	Candidate	1st pref.
Sinn Féin	Cara McShane	1,913
Sinn Féin	Oliver McMullan	1,462
Sinn Féin	Maighréad Watson	1,142
DUP	Bill Kennedy	945
Alliance	Glenise Morgan	733
SDLP	Margaret McKillop	652
UUP	Wesley Craig	587
Aontú	John Robbin	265
Turnout		7,699
Sinn Féin gain from Independent		
DUP gain from UUP		

=== Derry and Strabane ===
Ballyarnett
Party	Candidate	1st pref.
Sinn Féin	Sandra Duffy	2,164
SDLP	Rory Farrell	1,405
Sinn Féin	John McGowan	1,299
SDLP	Brian Tierney	1,006
Sinn Féin	Pat Murphy	960
Aontú	Emmet Doyle	887
SDLP	Catherine McDaid	856
People Before Profit	Damien Doherty	727
Alliance	Colm Cavanagh	436
Turnout		9,740
Sinn Féin gain from Aontú		

Derg
Party	Candidate	1st pref.
DUP	Keith Kerrigan	1,669
Sinn Féin	Ruairí McHugh	1,442
UUP	Derek Hussey	1,377
Sinn Féin	Caroline Devine	1,246
Sinn Féin	Antaine Ó Fearghail	1,197
SDLP	Steven Edwards	732
Independent	Andy Patton	507
Alliance	Anne Murray	177
People Before Profit	Adam McGinley	112
Aontú	Leza Houston	99
Turnout		8,549
Sinn Féin gain from SDLP		

Faughan
Party	Candidate	1st pref.
UUP	Ryan McCready	1,282
Sinn Féin	Alex Duffy	1,193
Sinn Féin	Sean Fleming	1,162
DUP	Julie Middleton	988
SDLP	Declan Norris	919
Alliance	Rachael Ferguson	695
DUP	Gary Wilkinson	653
SDLP	Hayley Canning	616
People Before Profit	Damien Gallagher	310
Independent	Graham Warke	279
Turnout		8,095
Ryan McCready leaves DUP		
Sinn Féin gain from Alliance		

Foyleside
Party	Candidate	1st pref.
Sinn Féin	Conor Heaney	1,846
Sinn Féin	Grace Uí Niallais	1,111
People Before Profit	Shaun Harkin	979
SDLP	Lilian Seenoi-Barr	960
SDLP	Shauna Cusack	948
SDLP	Stephen McCallion	626
Aontú	Seán Mac Cearáin	423
Alliance	Danny McCloskey	266
Turnout		7,163
Sinn Féin gain from Independent		

Sperrin
Party	Candidate	1st pref.
Sinn Féin	Paul Boggs	1,993
Sinn Féin	Fergal Leonard	1,650
DUP	Allan Bresland	1,194
Sinn Féin	Brian Harte	1,125
Independent	Paul Gallagher	1,042
Independent	Raymond Barr	985
DUP	Maurice Devenney	964
SDLP	Jason Barr	811
SDLP	Tommy Forbes	538
UUP	Glen Miller	489
Alliance	Mel Boyle	381
Independent	Patsy Kelly	246
People Before Profit	Carol Gallagher	226
Aontú	Darán Mac Meanman	168
Turnout		11,812
Sinn Féin gain from DUP		

The Moor
Party	Candidate	1st pref.
Independent	Gary Donnelly	1,868
Sinn Féin	Aisling Hutton	1,317
Sinn Féin	Patricia Logue	1,069
Sinn Féin	Emma McGinley	912
SDLP	John Boyle	761
People Before Profit	Maeve O'Neill	578
SDLP	Dermott Henderson	445
Aontú	Darryl Christy	301
Alliance	Michael Downey	146
Turnout		7,397
Sinn Féin gain from People Before Profit		

Waterside
Party	Candidate	1st pref.
Sinn Féin	Caitlin Deeney	1,949
UUP	Darren Guy	1,797
DUP	Chelsea Cooke	1,262
DUP	Niree McMorris	1,225
SDLP	Sean Mooney	1,071
Sinn Féin	Christopher Jackson	1,019
SDLP	Martin Reilly	1,006
Alliance	Philip McKinney	748
UUP	Janice Montgomery	448
People Before Profit	Davina Pulis	388
Turnout		10,913
Sinn Féin gain from Alliance		

=== Fermanagh and Omagh ===
Enniskillen
Party	Candidate	1st pref.
DUP	Keith Elliott	1,029
Sinn Féin	Tommy Maguire	1,024
Sinn Féin	Dermot Browne	846
Sinn Féin	Andrea McManus	780
Alliance	Eddie Roofe	779
UUP	Roy Crawford	667
UUP	Robert Irvine	562
SDLP	Paul Blake	539
TUV	Donald Crawford	509
Labour Alternative	Donal O'Cofaigh	504
DUP	Jill Mahon	437
Turnout		7,676
Sinn Féin gain from SDLP		
Alliance gain from Labour Alternative		

Erne East
Party	Candidate	1st pref.
Sinn Féin	Sheamus Greene	1,753
DUP	Paul Robinson	1,410
Sinn Féin	Thomas O'Reilly	1,387
Sinn Féin	Noeleen Hayes	1,296
UUP	Victor Warrington	1,115
Independent	Eamon Keenan	560
SDLP	Garbhan McPhillips	498
Independent	Tina McDermott	238
Alliance	Richard Bullick	221
Turnout		8,478
Sinn Féin gain from Independent		

Erne North
Party	Candidate	1st pref.
Sinn Féin	Debbie Coyle	1,561
UUP	Diana Armstrong	1,392
DUP	David Mahon	984
Sinn Féin	John Feely	852
SDLP	John Coyle	783
UUP	John McClaughry	529
TUV	Alex Elliott	422
Alliance	Eric Bullick	358
DUP	David Stevenson	219
Turnout		7,100
Sinn Féin gain from SDLP		

Erne West
Party	Candidate	1st pref.
Sinn Féin	Anthony Feely	1,493
Sinn Féin	Elaine Brough	1,362
Sinn Féin	Declan McArdle	1,256
UUP	Mark Ovens	1,197
SDLP	Adam Gannon	835
DUP	Aaron Elliott	687
Independent	Paul McGoldrick	506
Alliance	Gerard McCusker	250
Turnout		7,586
Sinn Féin gain from Independent		

Mid Tyrone
Party	Candidate	1st pref.
Sinn Féin	Pádraigín Kelly	1,621
Sinn Féin	Roisin Devine Gallagher	1,464
Sinn Féin	Anne Marie Fitzgerald	1,204
Sinn Féin	Patrick Withers	1,072
DUP	Shirley Hawkes	1,057
UUP	Rosemary Barton	687
Independent	Emmet McAleer	629
SDLP	Bernard McGrath	497
Alliance	Matthew Beaumont	311
Turnout		8,542
SDLP gain from Independent		

Omagh
Party	Candidate	1st pref.
Sinn Féin	Barry McElduff	1,342
DUP	Errol Thompson	1,138
Sinn Féin	Catherine Kelly	1,013
Alliance	Stephen Donnelly	872
Sinn Féin	Marty McColgan	773
UUP	Matthew Bell	489
Independent	Josephine Deehan	469
SDLP	Brenda Mellon	385
Independent	Kathy Dunphy	80
Socialist Party	Amy Ferguson	75
Turnout		6,636
Sinn Féin gain from UUP		

West Tyrone
Party	Candidate	1st pref.
DUP	Mark Buchanan	1,619
Sinn Féin	Glenn Campbell	1,279
Sinn Féin	Colette McNulty	1,149
Sinn Féin	Ann-Marie Donnelly	1,129
Sinn Féin	Stephen McCann	1,093
UUP	Allan Rainey	829
SDLP	Mary Garrity	746
Alliance	Joyce Donnelly	457
Turnout		8,301
Sinn Féin gain from SDLP		

=== Lisburn and Castlereagh ===
Castlereagh East
Party	Candidate	1st pref.
DUP	Sharon Skillen	1,655
Alliance	Martin Gregg	1,377
Alliance	Sharon Lowry	1,045
DUP	John Laverty	890
DUP	Samantha Burns	879
UUP	Hazel Legge	710
DUP	David Drysdale	582
TUV	Andrew Girvin	534
Green (NI)	Terry Winchcombe	195
Turnout		7,867
No change

Castlereagh South
Party	Candidate	1st pref.
Alliance	Michelle Guy	1,452
Sinn Féin	Ryan Carlin	1,204
Alliance	Nancy Eaton	1,116
SDLP	John Gallen	1,035
DUP	Brian Higginson	1,006
Sinn Féin	Daniel Bassett	997
UUP	Michael Henderson	760
Alliance	Martin McKeever	727
SDLP	Simon Lee	656
Green (NI)	Jacinta Hamley	656
DUP	William Traynor	527
Independent	Andrew Miller	49
Turnout		10,185
Alliance gain from Green		
Sinn Féin gain from UUP		

Downshire East
Party	Candidate	1st pref.
DUP	Andrew Gowan	1,798
Alliance	Aaron McIntyre	1,102
DUP	Uel Mackin	1,060
Alliance	Kurtis Dickson	976
UUP	James Baird	726
UUP	Alex Swan	482
TUV	Stewart Ferris	396
SDLP	John Drake	312
Turnout		6,914
Alliance gain from UUP		

Downshire West
Party	Candidate	1st pref.
Alliance	Owen Gawith	1,693
DUP	Caleb McCready	996
DUP	Allan Ewart	971
Alliance	Gretta Thompson	936
DUP	William Leathem	918
UUP	Alan Martin	624
UUP	Liz McCord	615
Sinn Féin	Siobhán Murphy	308
Green (NI)	Luke Robinson	124
Turnout		7,179
Alliance gain from UUP		

Killultagh
Party	Candidate	1st pref.
Sinn Féin	Gary McCleave	1,958
Alliance	Claire Kemp	1,862
DUP	Thomas Beckett	1,509
DUP	James Tinsley	1,297
UUP	Laura Turner	659
UUP	Ross McLernon	654
SDLP	Jack Patton	364
Independent	Stuart Brown	78
Turnout		8,381
No change

Lisburn North
Party	Candidate	1st pref.
Sinn Féin	Paul Burke	1,239
DUP	Jonathan Craig	1,220
Alliance	Nicola Parker	1,137
DUP	Scott Carson	1,015
SDLP	Pat Catney	935
Independent	Gary Hynds	890
Alliance	Stephen Martin	856
UUP	Nicholas Trimble	627
UUP	Linsey Gibson	525
Turnout		8,444
Sinn Féin gain from UUP		
Independent gain from DUP		

Lisburn South
Party	Candidate	1st pref.
DUP	Andrew Ewing	1,139
Alliance	Amanda Grehan	1,111
DUP	Alan Givan	1,038
UUP	Tim Mitchell	870
DUP	Paul Porter	687
Alliance	Peter Kennedy	674
UUP	Jenny Palmer	625
Sinn Féin	Aisling Flynn	493
SDLP	Dee French	472
TUV	Stewart McEvoy	387
Turnout		7,496
Alliance gain from UUP		

=== Mid and East Antrim ===
Ballymena
Party	Candidate	1st pref.
Independent	Rodney Quigley	1,023
TUV	Matthew Armstrong	991
UUP	Colin Crawford	969
Sinn Féin	Bréanainn Lyness	926
DUP	Reuben Glover	913
Alliance	John Hyland	897
SDLP	Eugene Reid	805
DUP	Lawrie Philpott	462
DUP	Andrew Wright	310
Turnout		7,296
Sinn Féin gain from SDLP		
UUP gain from Independent		

Bannside
Party	Candidate	1st pref.
TUV	Timothy Gaston	1,468
TUV	Stewart McDonald	1,422
Sinn Féin	Ian Friary	1,292
DUP	Thomas Gordon	1,256
UUP	Jackson Minford	943
DUP	Tyler Hoey	838
Alliance	Jack Gibson	768
TUV	Anna Henry	562
SDLP	Morgan Murphy	211
Turnout		8,780
No change

Braid
Party	Candidate	1st pref.
Sinn Féin	Archie Rae	1,302
UUP	Alan Barr	1,058
DUP	Beth Adger	1,246
DUP	William McCaughey	1,224
TUV	Christopher Jamieson	1,195
Alliance	Chelsea Harwood	1,016
DUP	Julie Philpott	872
TUV	Matthew Warwick	840
UUP	Keith Turner	710
Turnout		9,463
Sinn Féin gain from DUP		

Carrick Castle
Party	Candidate	1st pref.
Alliance	Lauren Gray	1,607
DUP	Cheryl Brownlee	1,154
DUP	Billy Ashe	1,030
UUP	Robin Stewart	751
UUP	Bethany Ferris	706
TUV	Frances Henderson	437
DUP	John McDermott	269
PUP	Jim McCaw	164
Green (NI)	Jenny Hutchinson	136
Turnout		6,254
No change

Coast Road
Party	Candidate	1st pref.
Sinn Féin	James McKeown	1,180
DUP	Andrew Clarke	1,111
Alliance	Gerardine Mulvenna	1,094
DUP	Angela Smyth	808
UUP	Maureen Morrow	457
Alliance	Niamh Spurle	448
TUV	Wesley Stevenson	340
UUP	Olivia Swan	328
Green (NI)	Eddie Alcorn	113
Turnout		5,877
No change

Knockagh
Party	Candidate	1st pref.
Independent	Bobby Hadden	1,182
DUP	Peter Johnston	1,144
DUP	Marc Collins	931
Alliance	Aaron Skinner	903
UUP	Andrew Wilson	792
Alliance	Noel Williams	753
UUP	Gary McCabe	433
TUV	James Strange	348
Turnout		6,486
No change

Larne Lough
Party	Candidate	1st pref.
Alliance	Maeve Donnelly	1,389
DUP	Gregg McKeen	1,197
UUP	Roy Beggs Jr	1,139
DUP	Paul Reid	862
Alliance	Robert Logan	696
UUP	James Carson	480
TUV	Ronnie Donnell	427
Green (NI)	Philip Randle	215
Turnout		6,405
No change

=== Mid Ulster ===
Carntogher
Party	Candidate	1st pref.
Sinn Féin	Brian McGuigan	1,909
Sinn Féin	Sean McPeake	1,540
Sinn Féin	Cora Corry	1,283
DUP	Kyle Black	1,209
Sinn Féin	Paddy Kelly	1,049
SDLP	Martin Kearney	829
TUV	James Artt	530
Aontú	Noreen McEldowney	481
Turnout		8,830
Sinn Féin gain from SDLP		

Clogher Valley
Party	Candidate	1st pref.
DUP	Frances Burton	1,656
DUP	Mark Robinson	1,568
Sinn Féin	Gael Gildernew	1,475
Independent	Kevin McElvogue	1,361
UUP	Meta Graham	1,260
Sinn Féin	Eugene McConnell	1,212
Sinn Féin	Sean McGuigan	1,154
SDLP	Sharon McAleer	1,045
Turnout		10,731
Independent gain from SDLP		

Cookstown
Party	Candidate	1st pref.
Sinn Féin	Cathal Mallaghan	2,157
Sinn Féin	John McNamee	1,771
DUP	Wilbert Buchanan	1,249
Sinn Féin	Gavin Bell	1,215
SDLP	Kerri Martin	769
DUP	Eva Cahoon	768
UUP	Trevor Wilson	702
TUV	Timothy Hagan	663
UUP	Mark Glasgow	526
Alliance	Chris Hillcox	424
Independent	Louise Taylor	44
Turnout		10,288
DUP gain from UUP		

Dungannon
Party	Candidate	1st pref.
DUP	Clement Cuthbertson	2,096
Sinn Féin	Dominic Molloy	1,519
Sinn Féin	Deirdre Varsani	1,219
Independent	Barry Monteith	1,180
DUP	James Burton	656
Independent	Marian Vincent	628
SDLP	Karol McQuade	601
UUP	Ian Irwin	527
Alliance	Claire Hackett	471
TUV	Kinley Tener	299
Labour Alternative	Gerry Cullen	268
Aontú	Denise Mullen	146
Turnout		9,610
Sinn Féin gain from UUP		

Magherafelt
Party	Candidate	1st pref.
Sinn Féin	Darren Totten	2,077
Sinn Féin	Sean Clarke	1,530
DUP	Paul McLean	1,143
DUP	Wesley Brown	967
SDLP	Christine McFlynn	804
TUV	Raymond Love	671
UUP	Ian Brown	587
Alliance	Padraic Farrell	478
Turnout		8,257
No change

Moyola
Party	Candidate	1st pref.
Sinn Féin	Ian Milne	2,219
Sinn Féin	Jolene Groogan	1,874
DUP	Anne Forde	1,563
Sinn Féin	Donal McPeake	1,144
SDLP	Denise Johnston	651
UUP	Derek McKinney	592
TUV	Glenn Moore	519
Aontú	Sheila Fullerton	347
Alliance	Caleb Ross	247
Turnout		9,156
SDLP gain from UUP		

Torrent
Party	Candidate	1st pref.
Sinn Féin	Eimear Carney	1,678
Sinn Féin	Niall McAleer	1,666
Independent	Dan Kerr	1,395
Sinn Féin	Nuala McLernon	1,174
DUP	Jonathan Buchanan	1,170
Sinn Féin	Paul Kelly	996
SDLP	Malachy Quinn	961
UUP	Robert Colvin	714
Independent	Teresa Quinn	622
Alliance	Simon Graham	284
Turnout		10,633
DUP gain from UUP		

=== Newry, Mourne and Down ===
Crotlieve
Party	Candidate	1st pref.
Sinn Féin	Selina Murphy	1,863
Sinn Féin	Mickey Ruane	1,387
Sinn Féin	Kate Murphy	1,397
Sinn Féin	Gerry O'Hare	1,345
SDLP	Declan McAteer	1,233
Independent	Mark Gibbons	1,111
Independent	Jarlath Tinnelly	1,043
SDLP	Karen McKevitt	911
Independent	Jim Boylan	818
Alliance	Daniel Neary	660
DUP	Keith Parke	600
UUP	Ricky McGaffin	448
SDLP	Anne Sheridan	183
Green (NI)	Hugh O'Reilly	96
Independent	Finbarr Lambe	23
Turnout		11,480
Sinn Féin gain from SDLP		

Downpatrick
Party	Candidate	1st pref.
Sinn Féin	Oonagh Hanlon	1,579
SDLP	Gareth Sharvin	1,307
Sinn Féin	Philip Campbell	1,160
Alliance	Cadogan Enright	1,124
Sinn Féin	Louise Rooney	812
SDLP	Aurla King	613
SDLP	Conor Galbraith	590
Independent	Éamon Mac Con Eidhe	404
DUP	Sharon Harvey	267
UUP	Alexander Burgess	200
Green (NI)	Declan Walsh	117
Turnout		8,173
Cadogan Enright joins Alliance		
Sinn Féin gain from SDLP		

Newry
Party	Candidate	1st pref.
Sinn Féin	Valerie Harte	2,085
Sinn Féin	Cathal King	1,982
Sinn Féin	Aidan Mathers	1,483
Sinn Féin	Geraldine Kearns	1,259
SDLP	Doire Finn	961
SDLP	Michael Savage	935
Alliance	Helena Young	830
Aontú	Sharon Loughran	318
UUP	Andrew McCracken	285
Independent	Mariya Krupska	209
Workers' Party	Nicola Grant	104
Turnout		10,451
Sinn Féin gain from Independent		

Rowallane
Party	Candidate	1st pref.
DUP	Jonny Jackson	1,414
DUP	Callum Bowsie	1,331
SDLP	Terry Andrews	1,319
Alliance	David Lee-Surginor	1,011
Alliance	Tierna Kelly	965
UUP	Robert Burgess	937
Sinn Féin	Dermot Kennedy	866
UUP	Rachel Gracey	101
Green (NI)	Ali McColl	90
Turnout		8,034
Alliance gain from UUP		

Slieve Croob
Party	Candidate	1st pref.
DUP	Alan Lewis	1,723
Sinn Féin	Jim Brennan	1,569
Sinn Féin	Róisín Howell	1,443
Sinn Féin	Siobhan O'Hare	1,226
Alliance	Andrew McMurray	1,183
SDLP	Hugh Gallagher	756
UUP	Walter Lyons	383
SDLP	Will Polland	285
Aontú	Rosemary McGlone	245
Green (NI)	Seana Pitt	98
Turnout		8,911
Alan Lewis leaves UUP		
Sinn Féin gain from SDLP		

Slieve Gullion
Party	Candidate	1st pref.
Sinn Féin	Aoife Finnegan	1,934
Sinn Féin	Áine Quinn	1,932
Sinn Féin	Declan Murphy	1,907
Sinn Féin	Mickey Larkin	1,558
SDLP	Pete Byrne	1,447
Sinn Féin	Barra O'Muirí	1,331
Sinn Féin	Oonagh Magennis	1,316
UUP	David Taylor	1,197
SDLP	Killian Feehan	903
Aontú	Liam Reichenberg	439
DUP	Linda Henry	360
Alliance	Caolán Gregory	298
Green (NI)	Molly Ní Mhánais	69
Turnout		14,691
No change

The Mournes
Party	Candidate	1st pref.
DUP	Glyn Hanna	2,340
Sinn Féin	Michael Rice	2,040
Sinn Féin	Willie Clarke	1,915
Sinn Féin	Leeanne McAvoy	1,643
SDLP	Laura Devlin	1,370
Alliance	Jill Truesdale	1,105
DUP	Henry Reilly	1,089
TUV	Harold McKee	880
UUP	Lloyd Douglas	511
SDLP	Dominic O'Reilly	357
Green (NI)	Sean O Baoill	119
Turnout		13,369
Henry Reilly joins DUP		
Alliance gain from UUP		

== Aftermath ==
According to journalist Jonathan McCambridge, Sinn Féin's victory was mainly helped by appealing to voters regarding the DUP's reluctance to get Stormont back into a functioning state, although the DUP's vote share itself was largely unchanged.

An editorial in the Orange Standard, the official newspaper of the loyalist Orange Order, said the results of the election, and low voter turnout in several unionist areas, had presented serious challenges for the DUP, the UUP and other unionist parties. "The need to significantly reduce apathy amongst the unionist voter base was one of the issues that came to the fore. In some areas with a unionist majority the turnout of eligible voters was as low as 40%," it said. "A significant piece of work must be carried out to enhance unionist engagement with the political process – and in particular when it comes to elections. As a unionist community we must stand up and be counted when it really matters."
