= Danny Baker (politician) =

Northern Ireland MLA

Danny Baker MLA
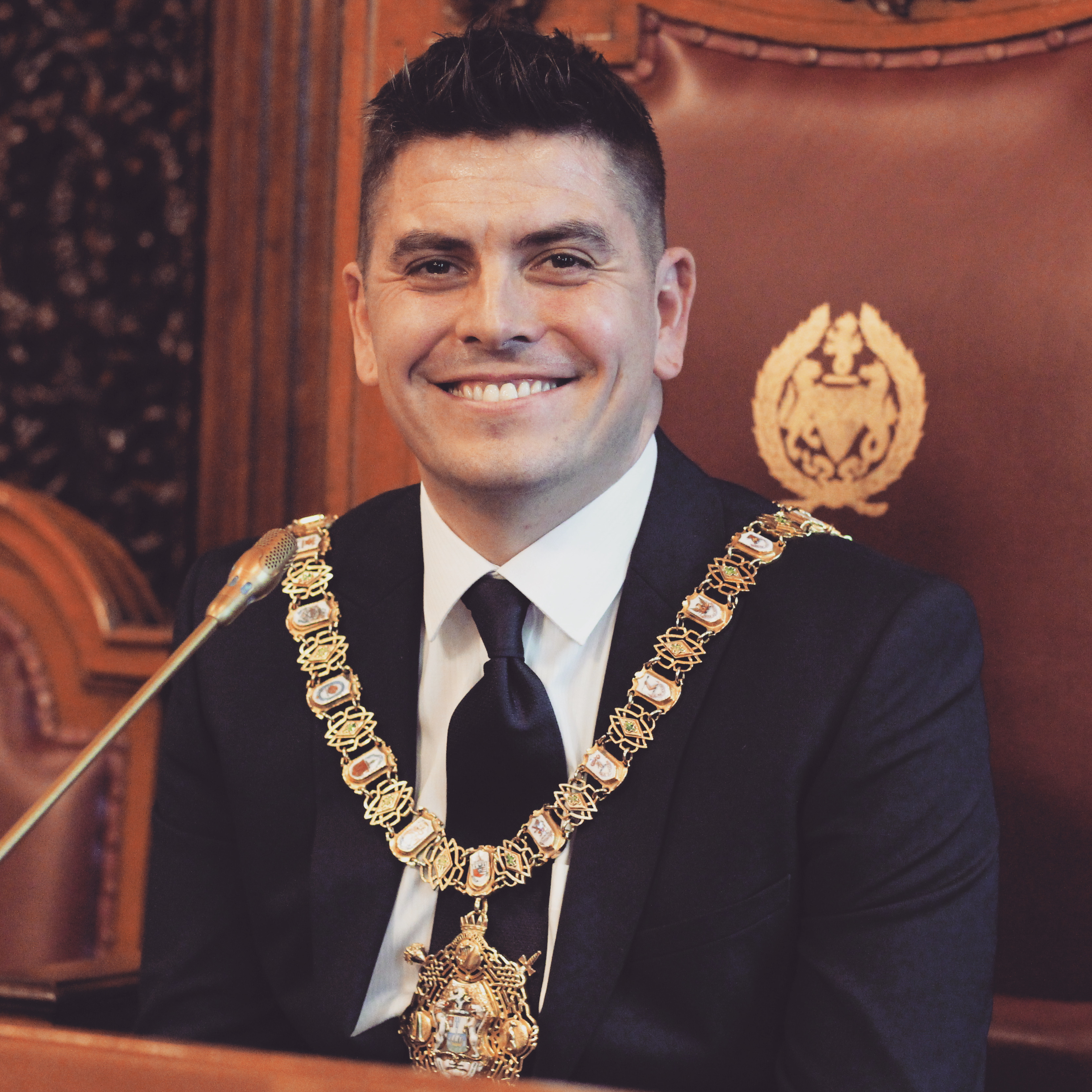

Member of the Northern Ireland Assembly for Belfast West
- Incumbent
- Assumed office 7 May 2022
- Preceded by: Alex Maskey

77th Lord Mayor of Belfast
- In office 18 December 2019 – 1 June 2020
- Deputy: Peter McReynolds
- Preceded by: John Finucane
- Succeeded by: Frank McCoubrey

Member of Belfast City Council
- In office 8 December 2017 – 7 May 2022
- Preceded by: David Bell
- Succeeded by: Joseph Duffy
- Constituency: Collin

Personal details
- Born: Daniel Baker
- Party: Sinn Féin
- Education: St Colm's High School
- Occupation: Politician

Daniel Baker is an Irish Sinn Féin politician who has been a Member of the Northern Ireland Assembly (MLA) for Belfast West since 2022.

He previously served as Lord Mayor of Belfast from 2019 to 2022, and a Belfast City Councillor for the Collin DEA from 2017 to 2022.

== Early life ==
Baker attended De La Salle College and St Colm's High School in Twinbrook, Belfast.

== Political career ==
Baker was co-opted onto Belfast City Council in 2017, and re-elected in 2019, representing the Collin electoral area. He was Lord Mayor of Belfast between December 2019 and June 2020 after incumbent Lord Mayor John Finucane was elected MP for Belfast North in the 2019 UK general election.

Baker was elected to the Northern Ireland Assembly, for Belfast West, in the 2022 election and currently sits on the Committee for Education and the Committee for Justice.
