= St Colm's High School =

Coordinates: 54.5515°N 6.0177°W

St Colm's High School, Belfast

Location
- Summerhill Drive, Dunmurry; Belfast, BT17 0BT; Northern Ireland

Information
- Type: Secondary School
- Religious affiliation: Roman Catholic
- Local authority: Education Authority (Belfast)
- Principal: Adrian Walsh
- Staff: 70 approx.
- Gender: Co-educational
- Age: 11 to 19
- Enrolment: 500
- Colour
- Website: www.stcolmshigh.org

St. Colm's High School is a Roman Catholic co-educational secondary school situated in the Twinbrook area, on the edge of Belfast, Northern Ireland.

== Academics ==
The school provides instruction in a range of academic subjects besides the core subjects English, Maths and Science. At Key Stage 3 these include Geography, Drama, Technology & Design, ICT, History, Home Economics, Music, Irish, Art & Design, Spanish. At Key Stage 4 optional subjects include Art & Design, Irish, Music, Religion, Geography, Drama, Textiles, History, Business Studies, Performing Arts and Religious Education.

== Notable alumni ==
- Danny Baker - MLA for Belfast West; 77th Lord Mayor of Belfast
