= Belle Steel =

Belle Steel was an 18th-century Presbyterian from Poleglass, County Antrim, Ireland.

In Cathal O'Byrne's book As I Roved Out there are a couple of chapters on Steel. She lived in a cottage in the townland of Poleglass, on the outskirts of Belfast and Lisburn, along what is now the Stewartstown Road. Her place in history comes from her sympathy for the Roman Catholic faithful who, under Penal Law, were denied their church buildings for worship. Steel was the trusted custodian of the sacred vessels used in the Liturgy, as well as a small horn used to summon the faithful to Mass. Her name is commemorated in the name of one of the roads through Poleglass. She kept watch and provided warnings to the people attending mass when the soldiers were approaching. She is depicted in many of Belfast's nationalist murals.
