= Peter Martin (politician) =

Northern Irish politician

Peter Martin MLA

Member of the Legislative Assembly for North Down
- Incumbent
- Assumed office 10 July 2024
- Preceded by: Alex Easton

Member of Ards and North Down Borough Council
- In office 18 May 2023 – 10 July 2024
- Preceded by: Hannah Irwin
- Succeeded by: Carl McClean
- Constituency: Bangor West
- In office 22 May 2014 – 11 May 2020
- Preceded by: Council established
- Succeeded by: Janice MacArthur
- Constituency: Bangor East and Donaghadee

Member of North Down Borough Council
- In office 5 May 2011 – 22 May 2014
- Preceded by: Leslie Cree
- Succeeded by: Council abolished
- Constituency: Ballyholme and Groomsport

Personal details
- Born: February 1971 (age 55) Bangor, County Down, Northern Ireland
- Party: Democratic Unionist

Peter James Martin (born February 1971) is a Democratic Unionist Party (DUP) politician who has been a Member of the Legislative Assembly (MLA) for North Down since July 2024.

== Background ==
Martin was first elected onto North Down Borough Council at the 2011 election, representing the Ballyholme and Groomsport District.

The North Down Authority was dissolved ahead of the 2014 local elections, with Martin being instead elected as a councillor for Bangor East and Donaghadee on the successor Ards and North Down Borough Council.

Martin retained his seat at the 2019 Council election. He resigned from the Council in 2020 in order to take up employment as an advisor to then Education Minister, Peter Weir.

Martin returned to politics at the 2023 Council election, being elected on the ninth count in the Bangor West District.

=== Member of the Northern Ireland Assembly ===
In July 2024, Martin was lined up as one of independent Assembly member Alex Easton's possible successors, following the latter's election to Westminster. He was announced as Easton's successor on 10 July, representing the North Down constituency. On his appointment, he said: "I am delighted to have been nominated to represent North Down within the Northern Ireland Assembly and I thank Alex for his endorsement. I will first and foremost be a voice for North Down and to deliver on the day to day issues they face. I want also to be a positive pro-Union voice within the Assembly chamber and demonstrate the benefits we will receive from being part of our United Kingdom." The decision to nominate Martin, a member of Democratic Unionist Party (DUP), as opposed to an independent, was criticised by the Traditional Unionist Voice (TUV), who had stood aside in favour of Easton at the general election. He denied reports of a deal being struck between Easton and the DUP, telling the BBC: "I hadn't done any deals with him. Alex had made clear that he did try to find an independent candidate, he said that today."

Northern Ireland Assembly
Preceded by Alex Easton	Member of the Legislative Assembly for North Down; 2024–present	Incumbent
