= 2023 Ards and North Down Borough Council election =

- 18 May 2023

All 40 council seats 21 seats needed for a majority
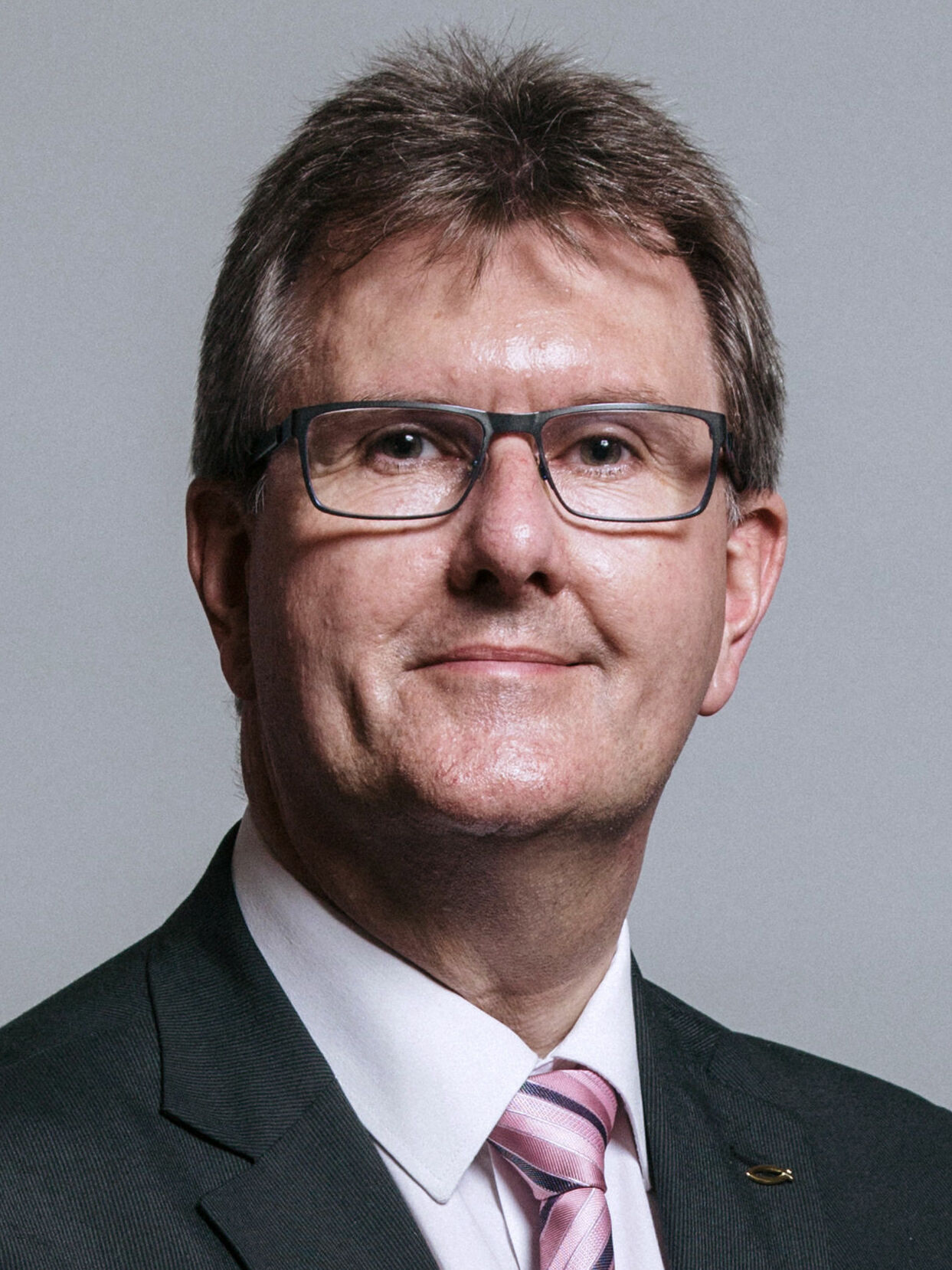

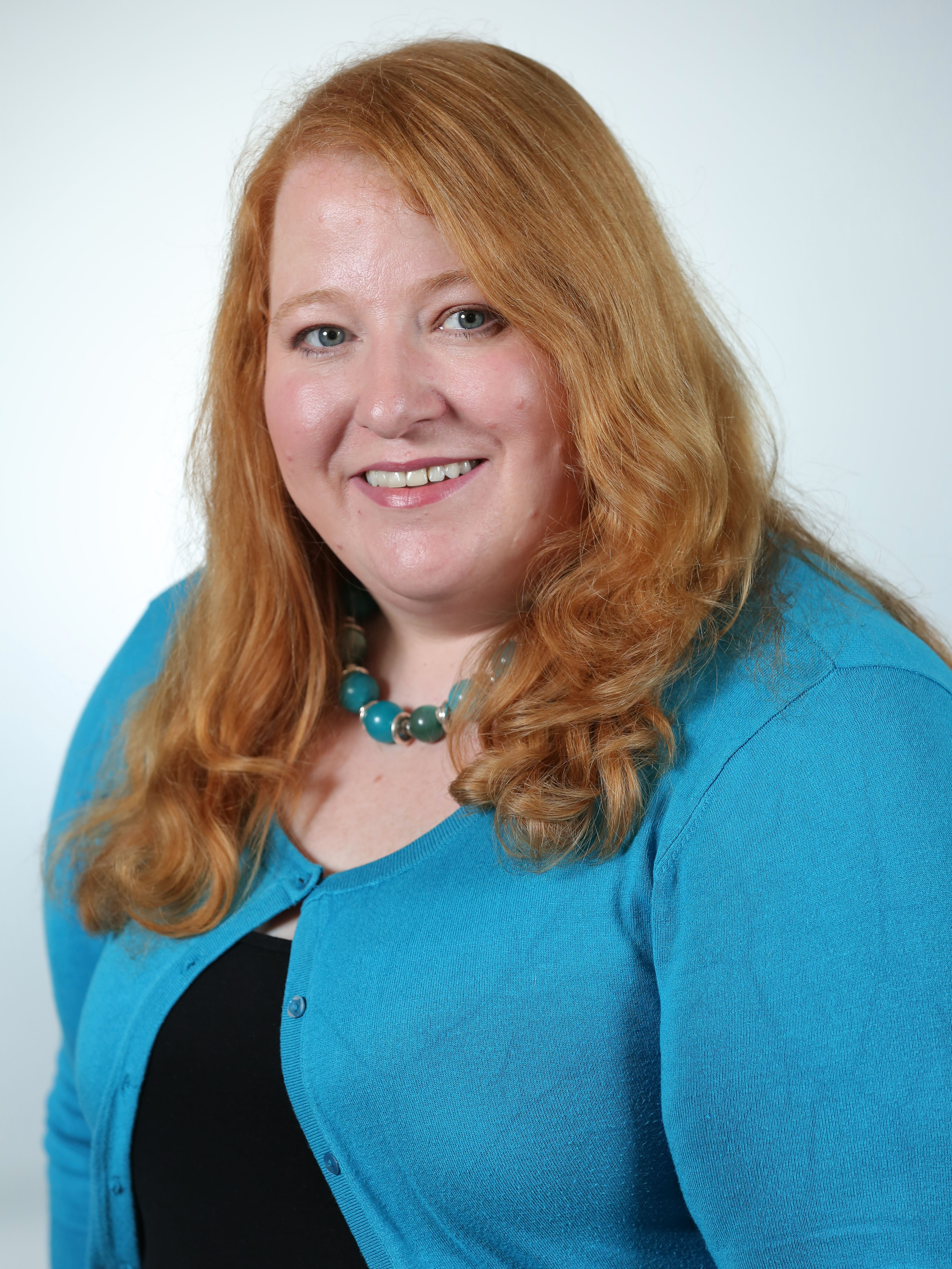

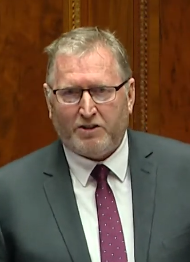

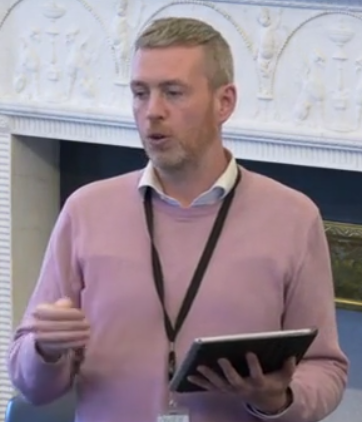

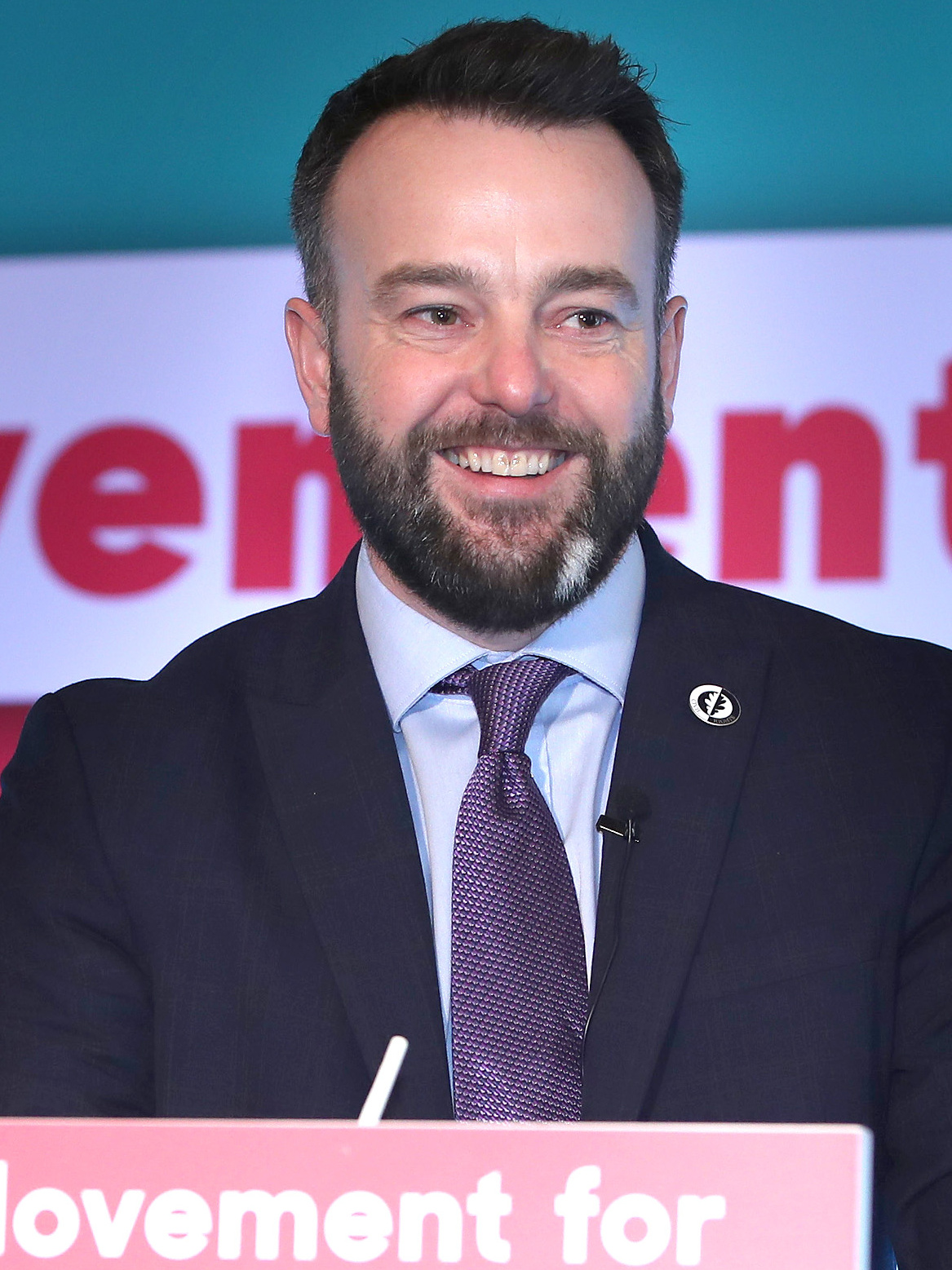
	First party	Second party	Third party
Leader	Jeffrey Donaldson	Naomi Long	Doug Beattie
Party	DUP	Alliance	UUP
Seats before	14	10	8
Seats won	14	12	8
Seat change	Steady	▲2	Steady
Popular vote	16,522	15,137	9,393
Percentage	29.0%	26.6%	16.5%
Swing	▼4.4%	▲4.4%	▼1.3%
	Fourth party	Fifth party	Sixth party
Leader		Mal O'Hara	Colum Eastwood
Party	Independent	Green (NI)	SDLP
Seats before	3	3	1
Seats won	3	2	1
Seat change	Steady	▼1	Steady
Popular vote	6,351	3,381	2,115
Percentage	11.2%	5.9%	3.7%
Swing	▲2.6%	▼4.3%	▲0.5%
- Ards and North Down 2023 Council Election Results by DEA (Shaded by plurality of FPVs)
Council control before election
No overall control
Council control after election
No overall control

The 2023 election to Ards and North Down Borough Council was held on 18 May 2023, alongside other local elections in Northern Ireland, two weeks after local elections in England. The Northern Ireland elections were delayed by 2 weeks to avoid overlapping with the coronation of King Charles III.

They returned 40 members to the council via Single Transferable Vote.

== Background ==
Ards and North Down is the only council in Northern Ireland on which Sinn Féin have never won a seat.

== Election results ==
2023 Ards and North Down Borough Council election result
Party	Seats	Gains	Losses	Net gain/loss	Seats %	Votes %	Votes	+/−
DUP	14	1	1	0	35.00	29.02	16,522	▼4.36
Alliance	12	3	1	▲2	30.00	26.59	15,137	▲4.36
UUP	8	0	0	0	20.00	16.50	9,393	▼1.31
Independent	3	1	1	0	7.50	11.16	6,351	▲2.55
Green (NI)	2	0	1	▼1	5.00	5.94	3,381	▼4.23
SDLP	1	0	0	0	2.50	3.72	2,115	▲0.49
TUV	0	0	1	▼1	0.00	4.83	2,748	▲3.45
Sinn Féin	0	0	0	0	0.00	1.66	945	▲1.13
NI Conservatives	0	0	0	0	0.00	0.59	337	▼0.72
Total	40						56,929	

Note: "Votes" are the first preference votes.

== District summary ==
Results of the 2023 Ards and North Down Borough Council election by District Electoral Area
District Electoral Area (DEA)	%	Cllrs	%	Cllrs	%	Cllrs	%	Cllrs	%	Cllrs	%	Cllrs	%	Cllrs	%	Cllrs	Total cllrs
District Electoral Area (DEA)	DUP		Alliance		UUP		Green		SDLP		TUV		Sinn Féin		Independents and others		Total cllrs
Ards Peninsula	44.71	3	13.78	1	8.05	1	1.62	0	13.93	1	6.45	0	10.29	0	1.18	0	6
Bangor Central	16.73	1 ▼1	28.75	2 ▲1	14.55	1	6.90	0 ▼1	0.00	0	5.37	0	0.00	0	27.69	2 ▲1	6
Bangor East and Donaghadee	23.39	2	23.90	2 ▲1	34.18	2	4.18	0	0.00	0	0.00	0	0.00	0	14.35	0 ▼1	6
Bangor West	25.72	2 ▲1	30.09	1 ▼1	13.33	1	11.33	1	4.57	0	5.09	0	0.00	0	9.87	0	5
Comber	38.48	2	28.83	2 ▲1	19.31	1	2.72	0	0.0	0	5.61	0 ▼1	0.00	0	5.00	0	5
Holywood and Clandeboye	19.81	1	41.03	2	12.80	1	14.67	1	6.97	0	4.71	0	0.00	0	0.00	0	5
Newtownards	32.38	3	23.51	2	13.54	1	2.43	0	0.00	0	6.44	0	0.00	0	21.70	1	7
Total	29.02	14	26.59	12 ▲2	16.50	8	5.94	2 ▼1	3.72	1	4.83	0 ▼1	1.66	0	11.75	3	40

== District results ==
=== Ards Peninsula ===
2019: 3 x DUP, 1 x SDLP, 1 x UUP, 1 x Alliance

2023: 3 x DUP, 1 x SDLP, 1 x UUP, 1 x Alliance

2019–2023 Change: No change

Ards Peninsula - 6 seats
Party	Candidate	FPv%	Count				
Party	Candidate	FPv%	1	2	3	4	5
DUP	Robert Adair*	21.33%	1,959				
Alliance	Lorna McAlpine*	13.78%	1,266	1,273.92	1,383.92		
SDLP	Joe Boyle*	13.93%	1,279	1,288.24	1,308.57	1,314.57	
DUP	Nigel Edmund*	6.89%	633	996.99	1,003.32	1,174.22	1,675.22
DUP	Davy Kerr	9.00%	827	990.68	1,014.99	1,165.61	1,314.61
UUP	Pete Wray	8.05%	739	773.98	810.31	949.27	1,069.06
Sinn Féin	Noel Sands	10.29%	945	946.65	963.65	964.65	965.65
DUP	Eddie Thompson*	7.48%	687	720.00	725.33	852.62	
TUV	Tom Thompson	6.45%	592	616.09	628.09		
Green (NI)	Gilian McNaull	1.62%	149	149.99			
Independent	Boyd Ireland	1.18%	108	111.63			
Electorate: 19,000 Valid: 9,184 (48.34%) Spoilt: 111 Quota: 1,313 Turnout: 9,925 (52.24%)

=== Bangor Central ===
2019: 2 x DUP, 1 x Alliance, 1 x UUP, 1 x Green, 1 x Independent

2023: 2 x Alliance, 2 x Independent, 1 x DUP, 1 x UUP

2019–2023 Change: Alliance and Independent gain from DUP and Green

Bangor Central - 6 seats
Party	Candidate	FPv%	Count								
Party	Candidate	FPv%	1	2	3	4	5	6	7	8	9
Alliance	Karen Douglas* †	16.31%	1,378								
Independent	Wesley Irvine*	16.20%	1,369								
DUP	Alistair Cathcart*	12.46%	1,053	1,053.84	1,061.84	1,091.36	1,107.68	1,397.68			
UUP	Craig Blaney*	10.85%	917	920.48	935.48	965.96	1,205.28	1,225.28			
Alliance	Chris McCracken	7.88%	666	699.24	705.36	707.16	718.76	719.88	722.76	1,154.88	1,436.88
Independent	Ray McKimm* †	10.47%	885	891.48	906.48	933.84	958.52	962.36	975.8	1,003.44	1,218.44
TUV	Peter Wilson	5.37%	454	454.36	463.48	492.88	505.36	552.2	712.52	713.52	729.52
Green (NI)	Stephen Dunlop*	6.90%	583	598.84	600.84	605.4	615.88	622.48	631.12	666	
Alliance	Alex Harbinson	4.56%	385	485.92	492.04	494.44	503.92	504.16	507.04		
DUP	Dean McSorley	4.27%	361	361.12	366.12	381.84	388.16				
UUP	Rachel McCord	3.70%	313	315.76	328.76	341.12					
NI Conservatives	Tim Mullen	1.02%	86	86.36							
Electorate: 19,376 Valid: 8,450 (43.61%) Spoilt: 105 Quota: 1,208 Turnout: 8,555 (44.15%)

=== Bangor East and Donaghadee ===
2019: 2 x DUP, 2 x UUP, 1 x Alliance, 1 x Independent

2023: 2 x DUP, 2 x UUP, 2 x Alliance

2019–2023 Change: Alliance gain from Independent

Bangor East and Donaghadee - 6 seats
Party	Candidate	FPv%	Count							
Party	Candidate	FPv%	1	2	3	4	5	6	7	8
UUP	Mark Brooks*	23.21%	1,972							
Alliance	Hannah Irwin* †	17.01%	1,445							
DUP	James Cochrane	15.01%	1,275							
UUP	David Chambers*	10.97%	932	1,323.95						
Alliance	Gillian McCollum †	6.89%	585	630.63	839.59	864.14	1,110.04	1,128.24	1,208.73	1,208.85
DUP	Janice MacArthur* †	8.38%	712	816.52	817.64	837.20	853.25	901.13	1,062.63	1,110.67
Independent	Bill Keery*	7.54%	641	668.30	671.66	697.22	731.42	751.58	1,019.71	1,021.15
Independent	Tom Smith*	5.41%	460	590.26	592.34	612.46	646.29	669.67		
Green (NI)	Ciara Henry	4.18%	355	394.30	408.25					
NI Conservatives	Paul Leeman	1.40%	119	132.65	133.13					
Electorate: 18,066 Valid: 8,496 (47.03%) Spoilt: 94 Quota: 1,214 Turnout: 8,590 (47.55%)

=== Bangor West ===
2019: 2 x Alliance, 1 x DUP, 1 x UUP, 1 x Green

2023: 2 x DUP, 1 x Alliance, 1 x UUP, 1 x Green

2019–2023 Change: DUP gain from Alliance

Bangor West - 5 seats
Party	Candidate	FPv%	Count									
Party	Candidate	FPv%	1	2	3	4	5	6	7	8	9	10
Alliance	Christine Creighton †	18.06%	1,175									
DUP	Jennifer Gilmour*	15.88%	1,033	1,063	1,063.77	1,068.77	1,205.77					
UUP	Stephen Hollywood †	13.33%	867	902	903.75	911.96	976.10	996.12	1,003.33	1,185.33		
DUP	Peter Martin †	9.84%	640	649	649.35	650.35	732.42	828.88	830.95	1,045.93	1,113.13	
Green (NI)	Barry McKee*	11.33%	737	752	758.23	880.63	884.77	884.77	913.47	978.61	1,002.97	1,019.77
Alliance	Alison McWhinney	5.96%	388	392	440.02	548.91	551.91	551.91	961.60	997.02	1,005.42	1,008.78
Independent	Susan Prentice	7.84%	510	522	522.77	529.77	585.77	589.41	598.48			
Alliance	Huw Stacy	6.07%	395	398	417.67	460.81	460.81	460.81				
TUV	John Gordon	5.09%	331	348	348.35	350.35						
SDLP	Tony McCann	4.57%	297	298	301.92							
NI Conservatives	Colin Breen	2.03%	132									
Electorate: 14,486 Valid: 6,505 (44.91%) Spoilt: 83 Quota: 1,085 Turnout: 6,588 (45.48%)

=== Comber ===
2019: 2 x DUP, 1 x Alliance, 1 x UUP, 1 x TUV

2023: 2 x DUP, 2 x Alliance, 1 x UUP

2019–2023 Change: Alliance gain from TUV

Comber - 5 seats
Party	Candidate	FPv%	Count				
Party	Candidate	FPv%	1	2	3	4	5
DUP	Libby Douglas	20.60%	1,501				
UUP	Philip Smith*	19.31%	1,407				
DUP	Trevor Cummings*	17.88%	1,303				
Alliance	Patricia Morgan*	14.84%	1,081	1,087.38	1,127.54	1,204.6	1,219.6
Alliance	Rachel Ashe	13.99%	1,019	1,032.64	1,074.72	1,160.8	1,215.2
TUV	Sam Patterson	5.61%	409	595.56	651.24	677.36	922.12
Independent	Stephen Cooper*	4.42%	322	374.14	399.58	452.36	
Green (NI)	Cory Quinn	2.72%	197	207.56	219.56		
Independent	John Sloan	0.58%	47	52.5	66.42		
Electorate: 15,112 Valid: 7,286 (48.21%) Spoilt: 95 Quota: 1,215 Turnout: 7,381 (48.84%)

=== Holywood and Clandeboye ===
2019: 2 x Alliance, 1 x DUP, 1 x Green, 1 x UUP

2023: 2 x Alliance, 1 x DUP, 1 x Green, 1 x UUP

2019–2023 Change: No change

Holywood and Clandeboye - 5 seats
Party	Candidate	FPv%	Count				
Party	Candidate	FPv%	1	2	3	4	5
DUP	Alan Graham	14.39%	1,112	1,300			
UUP	Linzi McLaren †	12.80%	989	1,056	1,344		
Alliance	Martin McRandal*	15.81%	1,222	1,226	1,237	1,385	
Green (NI)	Rachel Woods* †	14.67%	1,134	1,144	1,186	1,361	
Alliance	David Rossiter †	13.90%	1,074	1,076	1,083	1,179	1,256.39
Alliance	Helen Corbett	11.32%	875	891	900	1,004	1,021.75
SDLP	Déirdre Vaughan	6.97%	539	541	549		
DUP	Carl McClean*	5.42%	419	483			
TUV	Diane Adams	4.71%	364				
Electorate: 15,973 Valid: 7,728 (48.38%) Spoilt: 87 Quota: 1,289 Turnout: 7,815 (48.93%)

=== Newtownards ===
2019: 3 x DUP, 2 x Alliance, 1 x UUP, 1 x Independent

2023: 3 x DUP, 2 x Alliance, 1 x UUP, 1 x Independent

2019–2023 Change: No change

Newtownards - 7 seats
Party	Candidate	FPv%	Count							
Party	Candidate	FPv%	1	2	3	4	5	6	7	8
Independent	Steven Irvine*	15.76%	1,463							
DUP	Naomi Armstrong*	14.75%	1,370							
UUP	Richard Smart*	13.54%	1,257							
Alliance	Alan McDowell*	13.31%	1,236							
DUP	Stephen McIlveen*	11.38%	1,057	1,111.78	1,154.98	1,161.98				
Alliance	Vicky Moore*	10.20%	947	959.32	961.42	1,126.21	1,159.33	1,230.97		
DUP	Colin Kennedy*	6.25%	580	628.4	764.75	768.49	797.83	798.25	801.43	981.25
TUV	Eddie Allen	6.44%	598	670.16	681.26	686.68	700.36	700.72	702.4	872.68
Independent	Ian Cox	5.68%	527	618.3	625.5	672.21	685.08	685.56	701.16	
Green (NI)	Maurice Macartney	2.43%	226	233.04	234.39					
Independent	Ben King	0.26%	24	36.54	36.84					
Electorate: 21,723 Valid: 9,285 (42.74%) Spoilt: 167 Quota: 1,161 Turnout: 9,452 (43.51%)

== Changes during the term ==
=== † Co-options ===
Date co-opted	Electoral Area	Party	Outgoing	Co-optee	Reason
25 September 2023	Bangor Central	Alliance	Karen Douglas	Alex Harbinson	Douglas resigned.
30 October 2023	Holywood and Clandeboye	Green (NI)	Rachel Woods	Lauren Kendall	Woods resigned.
24 April 2024	Bangor East and Donaghadee	DUP	Janice MacArthur	Eddie Thompson	MacArthur resigned.
31 July 2024	Bangor West	DUP	Peter Martin	Carl McClean	Martin was co-opted to the Northern Ireland Assembly.
14 October 2024	Holywood and Clandeboye	Alliance	David Rossiter	Gillian McCollum	Rossiter resigned.
15 October 2024	Bangor East and Donaghadee	Alliance	Gillian McCollum	John Hennessy	McCollum was co-opted to Holywood and Clandeboye.
21 October 2024	Bangor West	Alliance	Christine Creighton	Naomi McBurney	Creighton resigned.
3 June 2025	Bangor Central	Independent	Ray McKimm	Tom Brady	McKimm resigned.
14 November 2025	Holywood and Clandeboye	UUP	Linzi McLaren	Stephen Hollywood	McLaren resigned.
9 December 2025	Bangor West	UUP	Stephen Hollywood	Katherine Newman	Hollywood was co-opted to Holywood and Clandeboye.
1 April 2026	Bangor East and Donaghadee	Alliance	Hannah Irwin	Rosaleen Quinn	Irwin resigned.
