= Poleglass =

Suburb of Belfast, Northern Ireland

Coordinates: 54.555°N 6.021°W

Poleglass: Irish: Poll Glas
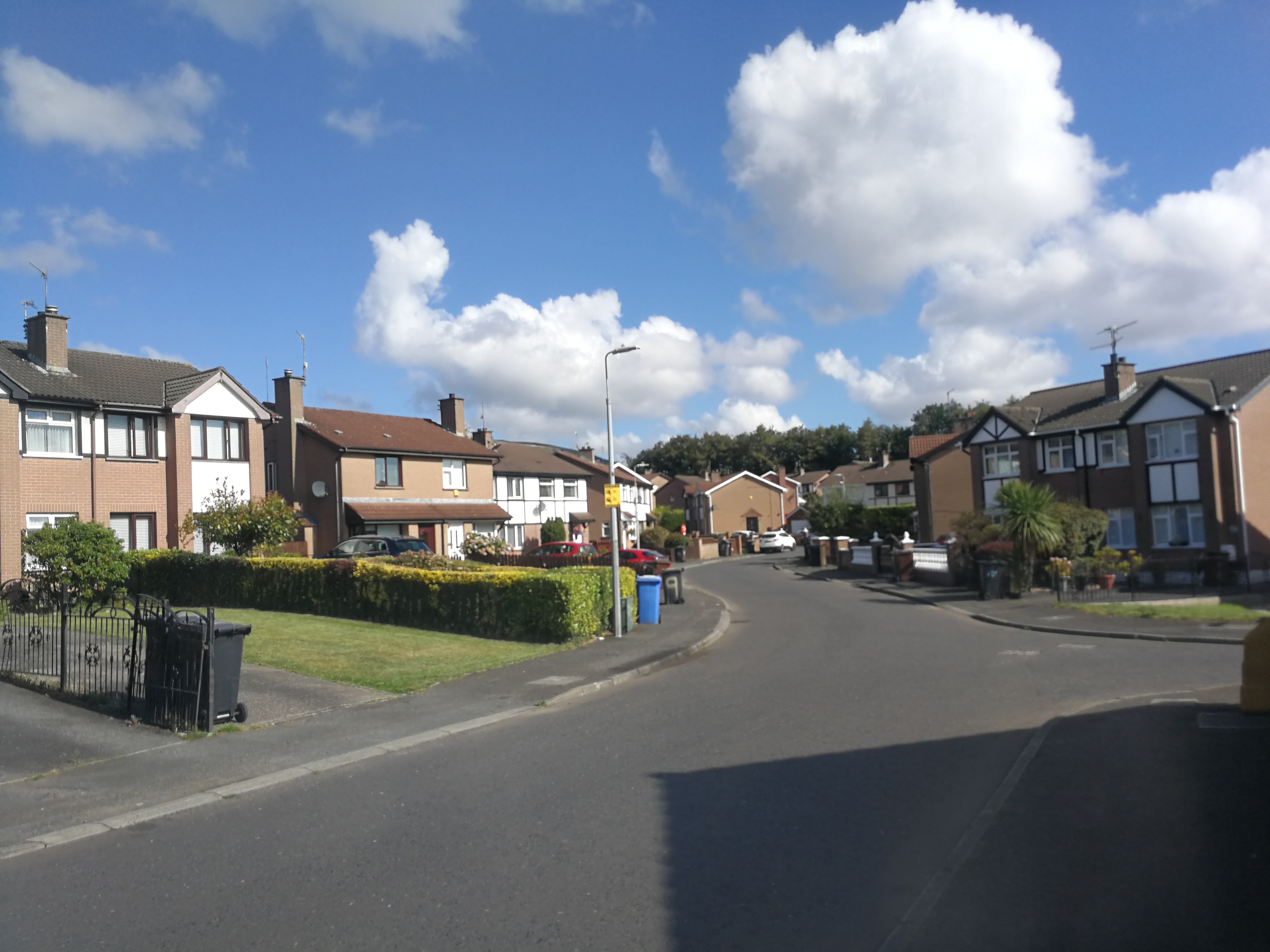
- A street in Poleglass

- Location within Northern Ireland
- Population: 9,105
- County: County Antrim
- Country: Northern Ireland
- Sovereign state: United Kingdom
- Post town: BELFAST
- Postcode district: BT17
- Dialling code: 028
- Police: Northern Ireland
- Fire: Northern Ireland
- Ambulance: Northern Ireland
- UK Parliament: Belfast West

Poleglass (from Irish Poll Glas, meaning 'green hollow') is an area of west Belfast in Northern Ireland. It is the name of a townland, a modern electoral ward, and a working class suburb. The townland is situated in the civil parish of Derriaghy and the historic Barony of Belfast Upper. It is mainly an Irish nationalist area.

Due to its proximity to both Belfast and Lisburn, it has become popular with commuters. This has led to the swift growth of housing in the area and a sharp rise in house prices. Addresses in Poleglass are classed as being in Belfast, and the telephone numbers in the area generally start with '90' as with the rest of Belfast.

== Early history ==
The area currently known as Poleglass has a long history of human habitation, with a ringfort having existed in the area yielding artefacts from the early Christian era. A thirteenth century silver coin was also excavated.

By the early 20th century the area had become part of the green belt between Belfast and Lisburn and was largely uninhabited. Cloona House is a substantial country house, a few miles from Belfast when it was built. It was the childhood home of Beatrice Grimshaw, journalist and adventurer. It was taken over by the Ministry of Defence in 1940, and served as the home of the General Officer Commanding of the British Army in Northern Ireland. In 1980 it was bought by the Catholic Church. It has been used for a community projects and since 2011 has been occupied by Colin Neighbourhood Partnership.

== Development ==
Poleglass was one of a number of housing schemes established in the forty years or so after the Second World War as an attempt to alleviate the overcrowding of the Catholic areas of west Belfast, in particular the lower Falls Road, which underwent extensive redevelopment during the period. The building of the estate was first mooted in 1973 but its location within the boundaries of Lisburn, a town at the time with a significant Protestant majority, led to vehement protests from loyalists. Building did not begin until 1979 and as a result of pressure from both Unionist politicians and the Ulster Defence Association the original Department of Environment plan for 4,000 houses had been scaled back to 1,563. The first areas, Old Colin and Colinmill, opened in 1980 with the first residents moved in on the morning of 28 November 1980.

By the year 2000 Poleglass had expanded to around 2,000 dwellings. This expansion was necessitated by the demolition of parts of the Divis flats on the lower Falls, with the residents rehoused in Poleglass. It is made up of small estates, such as Glenbank, Glenbawn, Merrion Park, Woodside, Glenwood, Glenkeen, Laurelbank, Old Colin, Colinmill, Springbank, Colinbrook, Colinvale, Ardcaoin, Brianswell, Hazelwood, Millpond Glen, Clona Manor, Pembrook Manor and Bell Steele Manor. Each of these vary in their size and age, some being fairly recent developments, others being original housing from when Poleglass first emerged. Notable landmarks include the Dairy Farm Shopping Centre, Footprints Women's Centre, the Church of the Nativity and Colin Glen Forest Park. The home of youth team Colin Valley football is situated behind the Olde Mill and they have won several trophies world-wide. Most memorably, they were winners of the Holland Youth Cup 1997. The Colin Valley senior side are also based at Good Shepherd Road in Poleglass. They compete in the intermediate sections of the Northern Amateur Football League.

One of the newest developments within Poleglass would be the 'Páirc Nua Chollann' a new park program situated in the Southwest Colin area brought forward by elected Sinn Fein representatives at Belfast City Council to suit the needs of Poleglass's youth. The public was consulted over the naming of the park, with a majority local vote opting for the “full” Irish translation Páirc Nua Chollann. It received 317 responses, and accounted for 42.4 percent of the public vote. It replaced a previous option, the English/Irish hybrid “Páirc Nua Colin.”

== Crime ==
In keeping with a number of social housing areas in Northern Ireland Poleglass has gained a reputation for the anti-social behaviour of gangs of "hoods" who indulge in such acts as joyriding. During the late 1990s a "Neighbourhood Watch" scheme was organised by local residents, with activities such as night-time patrols, the blocking of small streets to prevent access to joy riders and curfews for large groups of youth undertaken. The scheme was criticised by some as vigilantism with claims made by the families of some youths that they were forced out of the estate although members of the Neighbourhood Watch rejected these allegations. This followed an incident in September 1996 when the Provisional Irish Republican Army expelled seven men aged between 17 and 30 from the area after they had been accused of a spate of arson attacks on vehicles. The dissident Arm Na Poblachta has shown a level of activity in the Polegrass area.

Summary justice in the form of punishment beatings and knee cappings dealt out to transgressors by paramilitaries have continued to be a feature of life in Poleglass after the end of the Troubles. One such attack occurred in August 2008 when a 20-year-old man was discovered after being shot in the legs. In 2011 a 46-year-old man was seriously injured in the area in a case treated by police as attempted murder although no suggestion was made that this attack was connected to paramilitaries or punishment attacks.

== Transport ==
Poleglass is served by the Metro arm of Translink bus services as part of the 10c Colin Connect feeder service Poleglass to City Centre services are the, 10f, 10x and the 530a. The Poleglass to Lisburn service is the 530a.

The West Belfast Taxi Association, which provides a hackney carriage "taxibus" service to the outlying estates beyond the Falls Road, also connects the city centre with Poleglass.

== Politics ==
Poleglass is part of the Collin District Electoral Area. Poleglass, like most of West Belfast, overwhelmingly votes for nationalist parties like Sinn Fein and the SDLP. Since 2014, Poleglass has had a Sinn Fein councillor as their representative. Cllr Magennis led from 2014 till 2022 after being elected twice, he was later co-opted by Cllr McCann who is pushing to be elected for the first time in the 2023 Northern Ireland Local Elections.

Councillors and Elections
Elections	Councillor	Party
2023	Caomhín McCann	Sinn Fein
2019	Stephen Magennis (re-elected)	Sinn Fein
2014	Stephen Magennis	Sinn Fein

== Adjacent areas ==
Poleglass is bordered on the east by the Stewartstown Road, which originates in the Andersonstown area of west Belfast. There are two main areas of housing on this road apart from Poleglass i.e. Twinbrook and Lagmore. Notable residents of Twinbrook have included Bobby Sands who led an IRA active service unit on the estate from his parents' Laburnum Way home before his imprisonment prior to his death on hunger strike. Twinbrook has also long been home to several Irish Traveller families. Like Poleglass, Twinbrook gives its name to an electoral ward in the Dunmurry Cross area of Lisburn City Council.

The Lagmore housing estate lies to the south of Poleglass, in the Derriaghy area of Lisburn. Lagmore is a more recent development than Poleglass or Twinbrook and indeed as of 2012 houses are still being built on the estate. Its Catholic church, Christ the Redeemer, was only created as a breakaway parish from St Luke's Twinbrook in 1997 whilst the local primary school of the same name dates to only 1999.

== Notable people ==
- Belle Steel
- Michael Ferguson
- Frank Pantridge
- Chris Ward
- Beatrice Grimshaw

== See also ==
- List of townlands in County Antrim
