= Bangor East and Donaghadee (District Electoral Area) =

Electoral district in Northern Ireland

- Ards and North Down Borough Council DEA constituency

Current constituency
- Created: 2014
- Seats: 6 (2014–)
- Councillors: Mark Brooks (UUP); David Chambers (UUP); James Cochrane (DUP); John Hennessy (APNI); Rosaleen Quinn (APNI); Eddie Thompson (DUP)

Bangor East and Donaghadee DEA within Ards and North Down

Bangor East and Donaghadee is one of the seven district electoral areas (DEA) in Ards and North Down, Northern Ireland. The district elects six members to Ards and North Down Borough Council and contains the wards of Ballycrochan, Ballymagee, Donaghadee, Groomsport, Silverbirch and Warren. Bangor East and Donaghadee forms part of the North Down constituencies for the Northern Ireland Assembly and UK Parliament.

It was created for the 2014 local elections, largely replacing the Ballyholme and Groomsport DEA, and parts of the Ards East DEA, which had existed since 1985 and 1993 respectively.

== Councillors ==
Election	Councillor (Party)	Councillor (Party)	Councillor (Party)	Councillor (Party)	Councillor (Party)	Councillor (Party)
April 2026 Co-Option	Rosaleen Quinn (Alliance)	John Hennessy (Alliance)	James Cochrane (DUP)	Eddie Thompson (DUP)	Mark Brooks (UUP)	David Chambers (UUP)
October 2024 Co-Option	Hannah Irwin (Alliance)	John Hennessy (Alliance)	James Cochrane (DUP)	Eddie Thompson (DUP)	Mark Brooks (UUP)	David Chambers (UUP)
April 2024 Co-Option	Hannah Irwin (Alliance)	Gillian McCollum (Alliance)	James Cochrane (DUP)	Eddie Thompson (DUP)	Mark Brooks (UUP)	David Chambers (UUP)
2023	Hannah Irwin (Alliance)	Gillian McCollum (Alliance)	James Cochrane (DUP)	Janice MacArthur (DUP)	Mark Brooks (UUP)	David Chambers (UUP)
April 2021 Defection	Gavin Walker (Alliance)	Tom Smith (DUP)/ (Independent)	Bill Keery (DUP)/ (Independent)	Janice MacArthur (DUP)	Mark Brooks (UUP)	David Chambers (UUP)
May 2020 Co-Option	Gavin Walker (Alliance)	Tom Smith (DUP)/ (Independent)	Bill Keery (DUP)/ (Independent)	Janice MacArthur (DUP)	Mark Brooks (UUP)	David Chambers (UUP)
2019	Gavin Walker (Alliance)	Tom Smith (DUP)/ (Independent)	Bill Keery (DUP)/ (Independent)	Peter Martin (DUP)	Mark Brooks (UUP)	David Chambers (UUP)
May 2016 Co-Option	Gavin Walker (Alliance)	Tom Smith (DUP)/ (Independent)	Bill Keery (DUP)/ (Independent)	Peter Martin (DUP)	Mark Brooks (UUP)	David Chambers (UUP)
December 2015 Defection	Gavin Walker (Alliance)	Tom Smith (DUP)/ (Independent)	Bill Keery (DUP)/ (Independent)	Peter Martin (DUP)	Mark Brooks (UUP)	Alan Chambers (UUP)/ (Independent)
2014	Gavin Walker (Alliance)	Tom Smith (DUP)/ (Independent)	Bill Keery (DUP)/ (Independent)	Peter Martin (DUP)	Mark Brooks (UUP)	Alan Chambers (UUP)/ (Independent)

== 2023 Election ==
2019: 2 x DUP, 2 x UUP, 1 x Alliance, 1 x Independent

2023: 2 x DUP, 2 x UUP, 2 x Alliance

2019–2023 Change: Alliance gain from Independent

Bangor East and Donaghadee - 6 seats
Party	Candidate	FPv%	Count							
Party	Candidate	FPv%	1	2	3	4	5	6	7	8
UUP	Mark Brooks*	23.21%	1,972							
Alliance	Hannah Irwin* †	17.01%	1,445							
DUP	James Cochrane	15.01%	1,275							
UUP	David Chambers*	10.97%	932	1,323.95						
Alliance	Gillian McCollum †	6.89%	585	630.63	839.59	864.14	1,110.04	1,128.24	1,208.73	1,208.85
DUP	Janice MacArthur* †	8.38%	712	816.52	817.64	837.20	853.25	901.13	1,062.63	1,110.67
Independent	Bill Keery*	7.54%	641	668.30	671.66	697.22	731.42	751.58	1,019.71	1,021.15
Independent	Tom Smith*	5.41%	460	590.26	592.34	612.46	646.29	669.67		
Green (NI)	Ciara Henry	4.18%	355	394.30	408.25					
NI Conservatives	Paul Leeman	1.40%	119	132.65	133.13					
Electorate: 18,066 Valid: 8,496 (47.03%) Spoilt: 94 Quota: 1,214 Turnout: 8,590 (47.55%)

== 2019 Election ==
2014: 3 x DUP, 1 x UUP, 1 x Alliance, 1 x Independent

2019: 2 x UUP, 2 x DUP, 1 x Alliance, 1 x Independent

2014-2019 Change: UUP gain from Independent, Independent leaves DUP

Bangor East and Donaghadee - 6 seats
Party	Candidate	FPv%	Count							
Party	Candidate	FPv%	1	2	3	4	5	6	7	8
UUP	Mark Brooks*	17.47%	1,327							
Alliance	Gavin Walker*	17.15%	1,303							
UUP	David Chambers*	12.67%	963	1,006	1,144.78					
DUP	Peter Martin* †	11.87%	902	905	908.24	913.28	916.97	1,413.97		
DUP	Bill Keery* ‡	10.06%	764	775	784	787.6	799.12	965.2	1,280.72	
Independent	Tom Smith*	10.06%	765	805	844.06	904.9	922.27	966.31	973.79	1,056.75
Green (NI)	Hannah McNamara	9.67%	735	752	772.88	915.62	929.3	947.44	950.16	986.2
DUP	Janice MacArthur	9.24%	702	711	733.14	737.28	746.82			
NI Conservatives	Paul Leeman	1.80%	137							
Electorate: 17,416 Valid: 7,598 (43.63%) Spoilt: 98 Quota: 1,086 Turnout: 7,696 (44.19%)

== 2014 Election ==
2014: 3 x DUP, 1 x UUP, 1 x Alliance, 1 x Independent

Bangor East and Donaghadee - 6 seats
Party	Candidate	FPv%	Count										
Party	Candidate	FPv%	1	2	3	4	5	6	7	8	9	10	11
Independent	Alan Chambers* ‡†	19.15%	1,311										
UUP	Mark Brooks	15.65%	1,071										
Alliance	Gavin Walker	9.82%	672	724.92	731.58	804.68	839.66	1,001.66					
DUP	Peter Martin*	9.13%	625	662.8	664.6	671.44	685.58	691.51	691.51	726.28	782.4	1,083.4	
DUP	Bill Keery*	8.15%	558	594.68	600.98	607.98	619.31	627.71	627.71	653.88	755.77	905.81	945.33
DUP	Tom Smith*	7.90%	541	556.96	572.17	575.73	590.41	597.51	597.51	640.36	680.13	737.56	801.78
UKIP	Patrick Toms	5.38%	368	383.4	385.65	394.02	411.31	426.29	427.29	566.11	636.84	658.93	660.07
DUP	Terence Malcolm*	7.19%	492	516.08	517.61	522.89	531.26	539	539	563.37	614		
UUP	Christopher Eisenstadt	3.27%	224	285.6	333.3	349.51	390.3	424.77	425.77	507.38			
TUV	Joseph Strutt	5.29%	362	379.92	382.98	387.54	404.54	411.4	411.4				
Green (NI)	Trana Gray	3.87%	265	288.52	291.4	330.08	347.59						
NI Conservatives	Brian McBride	2.56%	175	204.96	208.83	218.39							
NI21	William McKee	2.64%	181	192.48	192.93								
Electorate: 16,956 Valid: 6,845 (40.37%) Spoilt: 70 Quota: 978 Turnout: 6,915 (40.78%)
