= Séanna Walsh =

Irish republican politician and former militant

- Sid Walsh speaking at a Sinn Féin commemoration for IRA Volunteer Charlie McGlade in Drimnagh, Dublin, September 2010

Member of Belfast City Council
- Incumbent
- Assumed office 14 September 2015
- Preceded by: Bill Groves
- Constituency: Collin

Personal details
- Born: 1957 (age 68–69) Short Strand, Belfast, Northern Ireland
- Party: Sinn Féin

Military service
- Allegiance: Provisional Irish Republican Army
- Rank: Volunteer
- Conflict: The Troubles

Séanna Walsh or Séanna Breathnach or Sid Walsh (born 1957) is a Sinn Féin member of Belfast City Council and a former volunteer in the Provisional Irish Republican Army (IRA).

== Early life ==
Walsh was born in the Short Strand area of East Belfast but for a time lived in Ravenhill Avenue until loyalists intimidated the Walsh family out of their home. Séanna's great grandfather had been shot dead in the same area by B-Specials when Northern Ireland was founded.

== IRA activity and imprisonment ==
In 1973, Walsh was arrested along with a number of fellow IRA men while robbing a bank and was sentenced to five years' imprisonment. In Long Kesh prison, where he was entitled to Special Category Status as an IRA prisoner, he met and befriended Bobby Sands.

Séanna was released from prison in May 1976. Three months later he was arrested and charged with possession of a rifle and was sentenced to ten years in prison. By the time he arrived back in the H-Blocks, the British government had withdrawn Special Category status and the IRA members had commenced their blanket protest. Walsh refused to wear a prison uniform and went on to become one of the leaders of the blanket protest.

When the hunger strike ended in late 1981, Walsh became the Officer Commanding (OC) of the IRA prisoners in the H-Blocks. He was released after seven years and seven months. Upon his release, he married Sinéad Moore, a former republican prisoner. They had two daughters, the youngest of whom was only two weeks old when he was arrested again, caught making explosives and mortar bombs. He was sentenced to twenty-two years in prison. While on remand in Crumlin Road Gaol, Walsh again became OC of the IRA prisoners.

=== Release ===
At the age of forty-two, Walsh had spent over half his life, a total of twenty-one years, in jail. He was released along with other imprisoned IRA members under the provisions of the 1998 Belfast Agreement.

In July 2005, he appeared on a DVD reading out a statement from the IRA Army Council announcing the end to its armed campaign. In doing so, Walsh became the first IRA member since 1972 to represent the organisation without wearing a mask.

=== Working for reconciliation ===
In 2012, Walsh, along with other former paramilitaries, of both sides, participated in the launching of the Irish language edition of the Department of Education's From Prison to Peace education pack, intended for 14–16 years old pupils.

In February 2015, along with three other former members of the IRA, he met, in Derry, four former British Army soldiers who had served in Northern Ireland during the Troubles. The men talked about the reasons they had taken up arms, the consequences of their decision, and the prospects for a lasting peace.

== Political career ==
In 2012 Walsh was working for Sinn Féin as head of its Irish language department. In 2015 he was co-opted by the party onto Belfast City Council for the District Electoral Area of Collin to replace Bill Groves. He held his seat at the 2019 council elections.
