= Collin (District Electoral Area) =

Electoral division of Belfast, Northern Ireland

- Belfast City Council DEA constituency
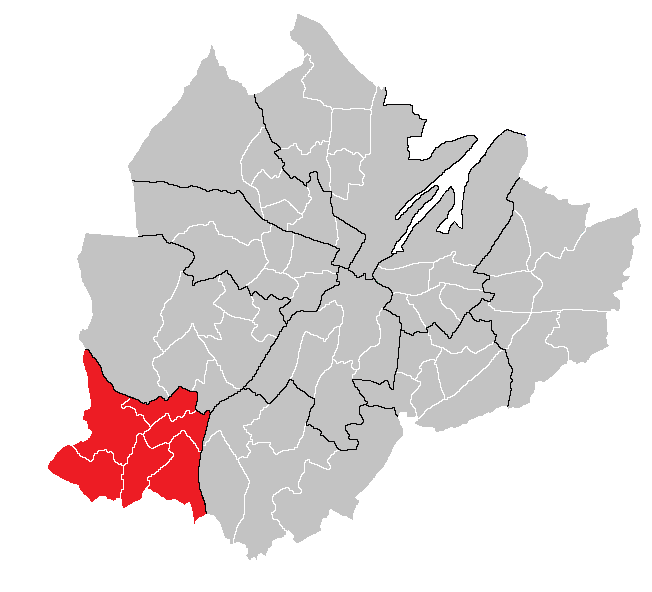
- Collin DEA marked on a map of Belfast City Council and its wards

Current constituency
- Created: 2014
- Seats: 6 (2014–)
- Councillors: Michael Collins (PBP); Joseph Duffy (SF); Matt Garrett (SF); Siobhán McCallin (SF); Caoimhín McCann (SF); Séanna Walsh (SF)

Collin is one of the ten district electoral areas (DEA) in Belfast, Northern Ireland. The district elects six members to Belfast City Council and contains the wards of Dunmurry; Ladybrook; Lagmore; Poleglass; Twinbrook and Stewartstown. Collin, along with neighbouring Black Mountain and most of the Court District Electoral Area, forms the greater part of the Belfast West constituencies for the Northern Ireland Assembly and UK Parliament.

The DEA was created for the 2014 local elections, combining parts of the Upper Falls DEA, which had existed since 1985, with parts of the abolished Dunmurry Cross DEA from Lisburn City Council.

== Councillors ==
Election	Councillor (Party)	Councillor (Party)	Councillor (Party)	Councillor (Party)	Councillor (Party)	Councillor (Party)
January 2025 Co-Option	Matt Garrett (Sinn Féin)	Séanna Walsh (Sinn Féin)	Caoimhín McCann (Sinn Féin)	Joseph Duffy (Sinn Féin)	Michael Collins (PBP)	Siobhán McCallin (Sinn Féin)
2023	Matt Garrett (Sinn Féin)	Séanna Walsh (Sinn Féin)	Caoimhín McCann (Sinn Féin)	Joseph Duffy (Sinn Féin)	Michael Collins (PBP)	Clíodhna Nic Bhranair (Sinn Féin)
May 2022 Co-Option	Matt Garrett (Sinn Féin)	Séanna Walsh (Sinn Féin)	Caoimhín McCann (Sinn Féin)	Joseph Duffy (Sinn Féin)	Michael Collins (PBP)	Brian Heading (SDLP)
February 2022 Co-Option	Matt Garrett (Sinn Féin)	Séanna Walsh (Sinn Féin)	Caoimhín McCann (Sinn Féin)	Daniel Baker (Sinn Féin)	Michael Collins (PBP)	Brian Heading (SDLP)
2019	Matt Garrett (Sinn Féin)	Séanna Walsh (Sinn Féin)	Stephen Magennis (Sinn Féin)	Daniel Baker (Sinn Féin)	Michael Collins (PBP)	Brian Heading (SDLP)
November 2017 Co-Option	Matt Garrett (Sinn Féin)	Séanna Walsh (Sinn Féin)	Stephen Magennis (Sinn Féin)	Daniel Baker (Sinn Féin)	Charlene O'Hara (Sinn Féin)	Brian Heading (SDLP)
September 2015 Co-Option	Matt Garrett (Sinn Féin)	Séanna Walsh (Sinn Féin)	Stephen Magennis (Sinn Féin)	David Bell (Sinn Féin)	Charlene O'Hara (Sinn Féin)	Brian Heading (SDLP)
2014	Matt Garrett (Sinn Féin)	Bill Groves (Sinn Féin)	Stephen Magennis (Sinn Féin)	David Bell (Sinn Féin)	Charlene O'Hara (Sinn Féin)	Brian Heading (SDLP)

== 2023 Results ==
2019: 4 x Sinn Féin, 1 x People Before Profit, 1 x SDLP

2023: 5 x Sinn Féin, 1 x People Before Profit

2019–2023 Change: Sinn Féin gain from SDLP

Collin - 6 seats
Party	Candidate	FPv%	Count											
Party	Candidate	FPv%	1	2	3	4	5	6	7	8	9	10	11	12
Sinn Féin	Joe Duffy*	18.33%	2,559											
Sinn Féin	Caoimhín McCann*	16.83%	2,350											
Sinn Féin	Matt Garrett*	13.78%	1,924	2,029.82										
Sinn Féin	Séanna Walsh*	10.89%	1,521	1,910.62	2,186.77									
Sinn Féin	Clíodhna Nic Bhranair †	11.81%	1,649	1,671.44	1,700.54	1,880.34	1,892.34	1,900.68	1,923.04	2,024.04				
People Before Profit	Michael Collins*	8.54%	1,193	1,208.40	1,219.95	1,220.95	1,250.55	1,271.55	1,338.14	1,469.95	1,479.69	1,481.45	1,581.67	1,730.09
SDLP	Gerard McDonald	6.47%	903	913.12	921.97	922.67	931.19	938.71	985.23	1,018.63	1,034.08	1,034.52	1,181.96	1,520.65
Alliance	Eoin Millar	3.52%	492	496.84	498.94	499.24	504.24	518.24	588.46	617.06	622.01	622.89	647.41	
Aontú	Luke McCann	3.77%	526	529.52	531.92	532.12	537.34	566.34	576.34	594.56	597.11	597.77		
Independent	Julieann McNally	2.64%	368	371.96	384.86	385.36	390.36	425.80	448.32					
Green (NI)	Ash Jones	1.63%	228	230.64	232.29	232.59	238.81	260.81						
Independent	Tony Mallon	1.19%	166	166.66	167.26	167.36	169.36							
Workers' Party	Paddy Crossan	0.59%	83	84.32	86.12	86.12								
Electorate: 24,938 Valid: 13,962 (55.99%) Spoilt: 255 Quota: 1,996 Turnout: 14,217 (57.01%)

== 2019 Results ==
2014: 5 x Sinn Féin, 1 x SDLP

2019: 4 x Sinn Féin, 1 x SDLP, 1 x People Before Profit

2014-2019 Change: People Before Profit gain from Sinn Féin

Collin - 6 seats
Party	Candidate	FPv%	Count						
Party	Candidate	FPv%	1	2	3	4	5	6	7
Sinn Féin	Danny Baker* †	18.15%	2,196						
People Before Profit	Michael Collins	12.93%	1,565	1,601.54	1,667.96	1,738.96			
Sinn Féin	Séanna Walsh*	11.58%	1,402	1,666.81	1,672.81	1,684.44	1,684.44	1,700.07	1,762.07
Sinn Féin	Stephen Magennis* †	13.35%	1,616	1,646.66	1,653.5	1,658.5	1,659.5	1,673.92	1,708.76
SDLP	Brian Heading*	8.02%	970	980.92	1,002.97	1,044.39	1,094.39	1,430.39	1,682.23
Sinn Féin	Matt Garrett*	10.44%	1,264	1,342.75	1,351.17	1,360.8	1,362.8	1,391.64	1,465.53
Sinn Féin	Charlene O'Hara*	9.81%	1,187	1,205.48	1,210.48	1,213.9	1,213.9	1,226.53	1,268.56
Aontú	Nichola McClean	5.54%	670	675.67	681.67	691.67	702.67	743.67	
Alliance	Donnamarie Higgins	3.66%	443	445.31	460.31	538.94	637.94		
DUP	David McKee	2.55%	309	309	389	393			
Green (NI)	Ellen Murray	1.99%	241	244.15	255.15				
UUP	Fred Rodgers	1.07%	130	130					
Workers' Party	Paddy Crossan	0.90%	109	111.73					
Electorate: 23,300 Valid: 12,102 (51.94%) Spoilt: 221 Quota: 1,729 Turnout: 12,323 (52.89%)

== 2014 Results ==
2014: 5 x Sinn Féin, 1 x SDLP

Collin - 6 seats
Party	Candidate	FPv%	Count						
Party	Candidate	FPv%	1	2	3	4	5	6	7
Sinn Féin	David Bell* †	14.96%	1,669						
Sinn Féin	Stephen Magennis*	14.50%	1,618						
SDLP	Brian Heading*	9.56%	1,067	1,069.68	1,069.90	1,216.19	1,246.19	1,624.19	
Sinn Féin	Matt Garrett*	13.01%	1,452	1,504.56	1,504.84	1,540.24	1,545.24	1,579.50	1,708.50
Sinn Féin	Charlene O'Hara*	13.23%	1,476	1,479.40	1,493.43	1,507.56	1,512.61	1,544.89	1,658.89
Sinn Féin	Bill Groves* †	11.72%	1,308	1,310.40	1,311.08	1,315.16	1,315.31	1,336.41	1,427.69
NI21	Wendy Burke	3.83%	427	427.56	427.58	514.70	753.74	802.75	806.82
éirígí	Máire Drumm	6.54%	730	731.76	732.06	740.19	744.19	751.30	
SDLP	Laura Whinnery	4.58%	511	511.68	511.89	571.94	601.94		
UUP	Gareth Martin	4.27%	476	476.08	476.24	486.24			
Alliance	Gerard Catney	3.80%	424	425.24	425.28				
Electorate: 20,017 Valid: 11,158 (50.68%) Spoilt: 202 Quota: 1,512 Turnout: 11,360 (51.60%)
