= 2001 Belfast City Council election =

Northern Ireland local election

← 1997	7 June 2001	2005 →

All 51 seats to Belfast City Council 26 seats needed for a majority
	First party	Second party	Third party
Party	Sinn Féin	UUP	DUP
Seats won	14	11	10
Seat change	▲1	▼2	▲3
	Fourth party	Fifth party	Sixth party
Party	SDLP	Alliance	PUP
Seats won	9	3	3
Seat change	▲2	▼3	0
	Seventh party	Eighth party
Party	Independent	Ind. Unionist
Seats won	1	0
Seat change	▲1	▼2
- 2001 Belfast City Council Election Results, shaded by First Preference Votes.
Lord Mayor before election
Sammy Wilson
DUP
Lord Mayor
Jim Rodgers
UUP

Elections to Belfast City Council were held on 7 June 2001 on the same day as the other Northern Irish local government elections. The election used nine district electoral areas to elect a total of 51 councillors, most representing the more heavily populated north and west.

Sinn Féin emerged as the largest party, although Jim Rodgers from the UUP became Lord Mayor.

== Election results ==
Belfast local election result 2001
Party	Seats	Gains	Losses	Net gain/loss	Seats %	Votes %	Votes	+/−
Sinn Féin	14	1	0	▲1	27.5	28.4	34,727	▲0.8
UUP	11	1	3	▼2	21.6	18.3	22,318	▼1.8
DUP	10	3	0	▲3	19.6	18.1	22,128	▲6.0
SDLP	9	2	0	▲2	15.7	17.4	21,308	▲1.8
Alliance	3	0	3	▼3	5.9	6.8	8,330	▼2.4
PUP	3	0	0	0	5.9	5.8	7,130	▼3.4
Independent	1	1	0	▲1	2.0	3.0	3,660	▲2.9
NI Women's Coalition	0	0	0	0	0.0	1.1	1,321	▲0.1
Workers' Party	0	0	0	0	0.0	0.7	859	▼0.3
NI Conservatives	0	0	0	0	0.0	0.2	305	▼0.1
UK Unionist	0	0	0	0	0.0	0.1	74	New
Third Way	0	0	0	0	0.0	0.1	28	New

Note: "Votes" are the first preference votes.

== Districts summary ==
Results of the Belfast City Council election, 2001 by district
Ward	%	Cllrs	%	Cllrs	%	Cllrs	%	Cllrs	%	Cllrs	%	Cllrs	%	Cllrs	Total Cllrs
Ward	Sinn Féin		UUP		DUP		SDLP		Alliance		PUP		Others		Total Cllrs
Balmoral	9.9	0	34.7	2	10.1	1	29.8	2	12.4	1	3.1	0	0.0	0	6
Castle	14.1	1	11.0	1	33.3	2	27.8	2	6.9	0	2.5	0	4.4	0	6
Court	2.8	0	23.1	1	34.0	2	0.0	0	0.0	0	22.0	1	18.1	1	5
Laganbank	16.2	1	26.2	2	8.1	0	28.8	2	7.6	0	2.6	0	10.5	0	5
Lower Falls	80.2	4	0.0	0	0.0	0	15.9	1	0.0	0	0.0	0	3.9	0	5
Oldpark	46.8	3	7.0	0	15.0	1	19.1	1	1.0	0	9.4	1	1.7	0	6
Pottinger	9.7	1	28.2	2	36.2	2	3.5	0	5.3	0	13.3	1	3.8	0	6
Upper Falls	68.3	4	0.0	0	0.0	0	28.5	1	0.9	0	0.0	0	2.3	0	5
Victoria	0.0	0	36.6	2	28.0	2	1.8	0	22.8	2	4.2	0	6.6	0	7
Total	28.4	14	18.3	11	18.1	10	17.4	9	6.8	3	5.8	3	5.2	1	51

== District results ==
=== Balmoral ===
1997: 2 x UUP, 2 x SDLP, 1 x Alliance, 1 x DUP
2001: 2 x UUP, 2 x SDLP, 1 x Alliance, 1 x DUP
1997-2001 Change: No change

Balmoral - 6 seats
Party	Candidate	FPv%	Count			
Party	Candidate	FPv%	1	2	3	4
SDLP	Carmel Hanna*	22.60%	3,077			
UUP	Mary Crooks*	16.72%	2,276			
UUP	Bob Stoker*	14.93%	2,032			
SDLP	Catherine Molloy*	7.25%	987	1,919.77	1,945.77	
Alliance	Tom Ekin*	12.37%	1,684	1,780.57	1,935.49	2,047.4
DUP	Ruth Patterson	10.11%	1,377	1,377.74	1,779.11	1,982.6
Sinn Féin	Stephen Long	9.91%	1,349	1,435.21	1,445.58	1,446.53
DUP	Thomas Morrow	3.09%	421	425.07		
UUP	John Hiddleston	3.02%	411	415.44		
Electorate: 20,958 Valid: 13,614 (64.96%) Spoilt: 259 Quota: 1,945 Turnout: 13,873 (66.19%)

=== Castle ===
1997: 2 x UUP, 1 x DUP, 1 x SDLP, 1 x Alliance, 1 x Sinn Féin,
2001: 2 x DUP, 2 x SDLP, 1 x Sinn Féin, 1 x UUP
1997-2001 Change: DUP and SDLP gain from UUP and Alliance

Castle - 6 seats
Party	Candidate	FPv%	Count							
Party	Candidate	FPv%	1	2	3	4	5	6	7	8
DUP	Nigel Dodds*	27.94%	3,949							
SDLP	Alban Maginness*	17.83%	2,520							
DUP	Ian Crozier	5.37%	759	2,142.12						
Sinn Féin	Danny Lavery*	14.09%	1,991	1,992.02	2,094.62					
UUP	David Browne*	10.97%	1,550	1,868.75	1,874.95	1,946.95	1,947.7	1,951.7	1,979.41	2,337.41
SDLP	Pat Convery	9.93%	1,403	1,407.08	1,698.88	1,699.13	1,749.68	1,775.83	1,786.83	1,911.93
Alliance	Tom Campbell*	6.96%	984	1,027.86	1,090.06	1,094.56	1,106.71	1,131.07	1,141.27	1,325.27
PUP	Janet Carson	2.49%	352	456.04	457.84	478.44	478.74	484.45	490.41	
NI Women's Coalition	Elizabeth Byrne McCullough	1.79%	253	259.12	277.32	279.12	284.67	300.38	308.63	
Independent	David Mahood	1.26%	178	218.8	220.2	229.05	229.05	230.15	236.71	
Independent	Alexander Blair	0.77%	109	115.63	116.03	117.78	117.78	118.83		
Workers' Party	Marcella Delaney	0.59%	84	87.57	91.37	91.62	94.02			
Electorate: 21,068 Valid: 14,132 (67.08%) Spoilt: 365 Quota: 2,019 Turnout: 14,497 (68.81%)

=== Court ===
1997: 2 x UUP, 1 x DUP, 1 x PUP, 1 x UDP
2001: 2 x DUP, 1 x UUP, 1 x PUP, 1 x Independent
1997-2001 Change: DUP gain from UUP, UDP becomes Independent

Court - 5 seats
Party	Candidate	FPv%	Count				
Party	Candidate	FPv%	1	2	3	4	5
DUP	Eric Smyth*	26.71%	2,605				
Independent	Frank McCoubrey*	17.76%	1,732				
UUP	Chris McGimpsey*	15.66%	1,527	1,612.8	1,661.97		
PUP	Hugh Smyth*	13.70%	1,336	1,450.66	1,478.05	1,510.05	1,774.05
DUP	Elaine McMillen	7.38%	720	1,401.33	1,411.89	1,438.85	1,639.85
PUP	William Smith	8.34%	813	861.75	875.75	893.67	991.67
UUP	Fred Cobain*	7.40%	722	764.51	787.9	812.78	
Sinn Féin	Mick Conlon	2.76%	269	269.39			
Third Way	David Kerr	0.29%	28	31.9			
Electorate: 15,674 Valid: 9,752 (62.22%) Spoilt: 333 Quota: 1,626 Turnout: 10,085 (64.34%)

=== Laganbank ===
1997: 2 x UUP, 1 x SDLP, 1 x Sinn Féin, 1 x Alliance
2001: 2 x SDLP, 2 x UUP, 1 x Sinn Féin
1997-2001 Change: SDLP gain from Alliance

Laganbank - 5 seats
Party	Candidate	FPv%	Count						
Party	Candidate	FPv%	1	2	3	4	5	6	7
UUP	Michael McGimpsey*	18.64%	2,019						
Sinn Féin	Alex Maskey*	16.14%	1,748	1,748.33	1,768.33	1,799.33	1,869.33		
SDLP	Peter O'Reilly	14.88%	1,612	1,614.86	1,624.97	1,663.41	1,865.41		
SDLP	Patrick McCarthy	13.95%	1,511	1,516.06	1,532.06	1,602.94	1,799.04	1,841.04	
UUP	Jim Clarke*	7.56%	819	952.7	954.76	1,083.14	1,118.56	1,118.56	1,839.56
Alliance	Mark Long	7.62%	825	846.67	857.78	929.65	1,149.62	1,159.62	1,195.62
DUP	Richard Scott	8.14%	882	900.48	901.48	993.97	999.08	999.08	
NI Women's Coalition	Anne Monaghan	6.49%	703	709.93	740.93	834.81			
PUP	Dawn Purvis	2.64%	286	302.5	309.61				
Workers' Party	Paddy Lynn	1.46%	158	158.55	173.66				
Independent	Andrew Frew	1.30%	141	143.31	148.31				
Independent	Barbara Muldoon	1.18%	128	128.66					
Electorate: 17,687 Valid: 10,832 (61.24%) Spoilt: 250 Quota: 1,806 Turnout: 11,082 (62.66%)

=== Lower Falls ===
1997: 4 x Sinn Féin, 1 x SDLP
2001: 4 x Sinn Féin, 1 x SDLP
1997-2001 Change: No change

Lower Falls - 5 seats
Party	Candidate	FPv%	Count				
Party	Candidate	FPv%	1	2	3	4	5
Sinn Féin	Fra McCann*	18.97%	2,399				
Sinn Féin	Tom Hartley*	18.59%	2,351				
Sinn Féin	Máire Cush	17.63%	2,230				
SDLP	Margaret Walsh*	15.94%	2,016	2,262			
Sinn Féin	Marie Moore*	15.16%	1,917	1,928	1,955.17	1,977.94	1,996.94
Sinn Féin	Sean McKnight*	9.86%	1,247	1,272	1,521.99	1,735.83	1,761.83
Workers' Party	John Lowry	3.86%	488				
Electorate: 18,349 Valid: 12,648 (68.93%) Spoilt: 581 Quota: 2,109 Turnout: 13,229 (72.10%)

=== Oldpark ===
1997: 3 x Sinn Féin, 1 x SDLP, 1 x UUP, 1 x PUP
2001: 3 x Sinn Féin, 1 x SDLP, 1 x DUP, 1 x PUP
1997-2001 Change: DUP gain from UUP

Oldpark - 6 seats
Party	Candidate	FPv%	Count							
Party	Candidate	FPv%	1	2	3	4	5	6	7	8
Sinn Féin	Gerard Brophy	17.25%	2,755							
Sinn Féin	Margaret McClenaghan	15.44%	2,467							
DUP	Nelson McCausland*	14.97%	2,392							
SDLP	Martin Morgan*	12.09%	1,932	1,958.52	1,993.69	2,006.81	2,007.56	2,931.56		
PUP	Billy Hutchinson*	9.49%	1,516	1,516.85	1,608.02	1,608.5	1,648.65	1,670.24	1,704.24	2,471.24
Sinn Féin	Eoin O'Broin	5.99%	957	1,298.36	1,315.53	1,455.69	1,455.79	1,534.41	1,837.41	1,857.46
Sinn Féin	Kathy Stanton	8.13%	1,298	1,340.67	1,344.35	1,360.99	1,361.04	1,391.08	1,501.08	1,510.14
UUP	Fred Proctor*	6.99%	1,116	1,116.34	1,246.51	1,246.51	1,311.01	1,327.35	1,355.35	
SDLP	Joleen Connelly	6.97%	1,114	1,151.06	1,202.06	1,210.86	1,211.01			
Independent	James Bates	1.31%	209	209.17						
Alliance	Thomas McCullough	1.00%	160	161.36						
Independent	Rene Graig	0.37%	59	59.17						
Electorate: 23,866 Valid: 15,975 (66.94%) Spoilt: 687 Quota: 2,283 Turnout: 16,662 (69.81%)

=== Pottinger ===
1997: 2 x DUP, 2 x UUP, 1 x PUP, 1 x Sinn Féin
2001: 2 x DUP, 2 x UUP, 1 x PUP, 1 x Alliance
1997-2001 Change: Sinn Féin gain from Alliance

Pottinger - 6 seats
Party	Candidate	FPv%	Count									
Party	Candidate	FPv%	1	2	3	4	5	6	7	8	9	10
DUP	Sammy Wilson*	30.21%	3,918									
UUP	Reg Empey*	23.88%	3,097									
PUP	David Ervine*	12.20%	1,582	1,748.42	2,005.46							
UUP	Margaret Clarke*	4.31%	559	621.01	1,279.99	1,338.86	1,366.14	1,398.3	1,406.09	1,508.73	1,524.67	1,892.91
Sinn Féin	Joseph O'Donnell	9.75%	1,264	1,264	1,265.68	1,266.26	1,267.26	1,268.26	1,285.26	1,287.26	1,451.29	1,567.85
DUP	Harry Toan	1.58%	205	1,377.89	1,430.39	1,440.54	1,445.54	1,475.47	1,477.47	1,529.03	1,532.03	1,552.64
DUP	Mary Campbell	4.45%	577	1,146.22	1,196.62	1,204.16	1,209.37	1,232.61	1,236.56	1,297.52	1,302.59	1,328.67
Alliance	Mervyn Jones*	5.34%	693	702.01	801.13	825.2	842.04	845.14	881.27	929.43	1,189.34	
SDLP	Leo Van Es	3.54%	459	463.24	514.06	518.41	518.41	518.41	554.41	561.83		
Independent	John Bushell	1.68%	218	236.55	254.19	259.7	262.12	268.5	283.98			
PUP	Robin Stewart	0.97%	127	132.3	141.12	163.16	168.29	175.43	177.43			
Workers' Party	Joseph Bell	0.99%	129	131.65	134.59	136.04	138.33	140.33				
UK Unionist	David Fairfield	0.57%	74	94.14	118.5	127.49	135.57					
NI Conservatives	Jason Docherty	0.51%	66	70.24	89.56	93.91						
Electorate: 21,854 Valid: 12,968 (59.34%) Spoilt: 458 Quota: 1,853 Turnout: 13,426 (61.43%)

=== Upper Falls ===
1997: 4 x Sinn Féin, 1 x SDLP
2001: 4 x Sinn Féin, 1 x SDLP
1997-2001 Change: No change

Upper Falls - 5 seats
Party	Candidate	FPv%	Count			
Party	Candidate	FPv%	1	2	3	4
Sinn Féin	Paul Maskey	21.81%	3,349			
SDLP	Alex Attwood*	21.23%	3,260			
Sinn Féin	Gerard O'Neill	18.66%	2,866			
Sinn Féin	Michael Browne*	16.08%	2,469	2,548.68	2,628.26	
Sinn Féin	Chrissie McAuley*	11.73%	1,801	2,442.52	2,494.96	2,592.96
SDLP	Brian Heading	7.24%	1,112	1,131.44	1,569.13	1,774.13
NI Women's Coalition	Mary Catney	2.38%	365	385.4	450.72	
Alliance	Mary Ayers	0.89%	136	137.92	183.69	
Electorate: 22,107 Valid: 15,358 (69.47%) Spoilt: 614 Quota: 2,560 Turnout: 15,972 (72.25%)

=== Victoria ===
1997: 2 x UUP, 2 x Alliance, 2 x DUP, 1 x Independent Unionist
2001: 3 x UUP, 2 x DUP, 2 x Alliance
1997-2001 Change: Independent Unionist joins UUP

Victoria - 7 seats
Party	Candidate	FPv%	Count								
Party	Candidate	FPv%	1	2	3	4	5	6	7	8	9
UUP	Ian Adamson*	19.43%	3,286								
Alliance	David Alderdice*	18.45%	3,119								
DUP	Wallace Browne*	14.74%	2,492								
UUP	Jim Rodgers*	13.73%	2,322								
UUP	Alan Crowe*	3.44%	582	1,569.16	1,716.04	1,727.89	1,858.75	1,881.65	2,011.63	2,194.63	
Alliance	Naomi Long	4.31%	729	776.36	1,399.58	1,401.23	1,407.62	1,416.83	1,702.74	1,792.2	2,017.89
DUP	Robin Newton*	8.69%	1,469	1,492.31	1,516.45	1,636	1,658.41	1,678.71	1,702.85	1,810.58	1,955.77
DUP	Margaret McKenzie	4.63%	783	811.12	826.76	1,045.16	1,059.29	1,076.49	1,111.65	1,226.47	1,426.49
Independent	Danny Dow*	4.41%	746	758.58	816.04	823.39	830.77	857.54	890.67	996.7	
PUP	Robert Moorhead	4.12%	697	715.87	736.27	739.87	745.72	761.15	795.85		
SDLP	Ciara Farren	1.80%	305	310.18	383.62	383.77	384.76	390.78			
NI Conservatives	Peter Gray	1.41%	239	261.57	284.35	286.45	291.76	301.92			
Independent	Sammy Walker	0.67%	114	123.25	130.39	130.39	133.36				
Independent	Billy Hands	0.09%	15	16.48	17.84	17.84	18.02				
Independent	Lawrence John	0.06%	11	12.11	14.15	14.15	14.24				
Electorate: 28,160 Valid: 17,468 (62.03%) Spoilt: 559 Quota: 2,114 Turnout: 16,909 (60.05%)
