= 1997 Belfast City Council election =

Northern Ireland local election

← 1993	21 May 1997	2001 →

All 51 seats to Belfast City Council 26 seats needed for a majority
	First party	Second party	Third party
Party	Sinn Féin	UUP	SDLP
Seats won	13	13	7
Seat change	▲3	▼2	▼2
	Fourth party	Fifth party	Sixth party
Party	DUP	Alliance	PUP
Seats won	7	6	3
Seat change	▼2	▲1	▲2
	Seventh party	Eighth party
Party	Ulster Democratic	Ind. Unionist
Seats won	1	1
Seat change	▲1	▼1
- Results by district electoral area, shaded by First Preference Votes.
Lord Mayor before election
Ian Adamson
UUP
Lord Mayor
Alban Maginness
SDLP

Elections to Belfast City Council were held on 21 May 1997 on the same day as the other Northern Irish local government elections. The election used nine district electoral areas to elect a total of 51 councillors, most representing the more heavily populated north and west.

Unionists lost overall control of Belfast City Council for the first time in its history, with Alliance holding the balance of power between unionists and nationalists. Alban Maginness from the SDLP became the first nationalist Lord Mayor.

== Election results ==
Belfast local election result 1997
Party	Seats	Gains	Losses	Net gain/loss	Seats %	Votes %	Votes	+/−
Sinn Féin	13	3	0	▲3	25.5	27.6	29,379	▲4.9
UUP	13	0	2	▼2	25.5	20.1	21,404	▼1.9
SDLP	7	1	3	▼2	13.7	15.6	16,653	▼0.3
DUP	7	0	2	▼2	13.7	12.1	12,914	▼5.0
Alliance	6	1	0	▲1	11.8	9.2	9,781	▼2.0
PUP	3	2	0	▲2	5.9	9.2	9,758	▲7.7
Ulster Democratic	1	1	0	▲1	2.0	2.4	2,532	New
Ind. Unionist	1	0	1	▼1	2.0	0.9	955	▼1.5
NI Women's Coalition	0	0	0	0	0.0	1.0	1,090	New
Workers' Party	0	0	0	0	0.0	1.0	1,015	▼1.8
Green (NI)	0	0	0	0	0.0	0.5	548	▼2.0
NI Conservatives	0	0	0	0	0.0	0.3	327	▼2.0
Independent	0	0	0	0	0.0	0.1	79	▼0.2
Labour coalition	0	0	0	0	0.0	0.0	19	▼0.6

Note: "Votes" are the first preference votes.

== Districts summary ==
Results of the Belfast City Council election, 1997 by district
Ward	%	Cllrs	%	Cllrs	%	Cllrs	%	Cllrs	%	Cllrs	%	Cllrs	%	Cllrs	%	Cllrs	Total Cllrs
Ward	Sinn Féin		UUP		SDLP		DUP		Alliance		PUP		UDP		Others		Total Cllrs
Balmoral	0.0	0	31.5	2	26.1	2	13.9	1	17.0	1	3.5	0	4.6	0	3.4	0	6
Castle	11.4	1	27.0	2	20.9	1	24.6	1	11.9	1	0.0	0	1.8	0	2.4	0	6
Court	0.0	0	27.8	2	0.0	0	19.0	1	1.5	0	32.8	1	12.9	1	6.0	0	5
Laganbank	15.1	1	25.1	2	27.4	2	5.1	0	12.2	1	7.0	0	0.0	0	8.1	0	5
Lower Falls	79.7	4	0.0	0	16.2	1	0.0	0	0.4	0	0.0	0	0.0	0	3.7	0	5
Oldpark	44.8	3	16.3	1	16.3	1	4.7	0	1.2	0	11.2	1	3.0	0	2.5	0	6
Pottinger	8.6	0	29.3	2	2.7	0	26.5	2	7.7	1	20.9	1	1.5	0	2.8	0	6
Upper Falls	68.1	4	0.0	0	29.1	1	1.4	0	0.6	0	0.0	0	0.0	0	0.8	0	5
Victoria	0.0	0	31.7	2	0.0	0	31.0	2	31.2	2	0.0	0	0.0	0	5.9	0	7
Total	27.6	13	20.1	13	15.6	7	12.1	7	9.2	6	9.2	3	2.4	1	3.8	0	51

== District results ==
=== Balmoral ===
1993: 2 x UUP, 2 x DUP, 1 x SDLP, 1 x Alliance
1997: 2 x UUP, 2 x SDLP, 1 x Alliance, 1 x DUP
1993-1997 Change: SDLP gain from DUP

Balmoral - 6 seats
Party	Candidate	FPv%	Count									
Party	Candidate	FPv%	1	2	3	4	5	6	7	8	9	10
UUP	Mary Crooks*	20.49%	2,329									
SDLP	Carmel Hanna	16.85%	1,916									
DUP	Harry Smith*	8.13%	924	969.9	969.9	979.3	983.3	1,034.5	1,129.5	1,690.5		
UUP	Bob Stoker	8.35%	949	1,070.5	1,070.5	1,083.9	1,088.2	1,169.2	1,448.9	1,550.8	1,936.8	
SDLP	Catherine Molloy	9.21%	1,047	1,048.2	1,310.55	1,328.55	1,415.2	1,422.5	1,423.65	1,424.25	1,426.65	1,430.65
Alliance	Tom Ekin	8.54%	971	986.3	994.4	1,017	1,086.05	1,099.35	1,119.95	1,127.15	1,227.55	1,305.55
Alliance	Philip McGarry*	8.43%	958	974.2	984.55	1,004.15	1,052.35	1,074.25	1,080.85	1,087.35	1,166.25	1,203.25
UUP	Gordon Lucy	2.67%	304	688.6	688.6	719.3	723.2	763.2	848.5	908.9		
DUP	Joan Parkes	5.75%	654	712.5	712.5	719	721	779.9	804.5			
Ulster Democratic	Heather Calvert	4.57%	520	534.1	534.25	535.55	549.15	662.05				
PUP	Gordon McCrea	3.49%	397	415	415	422	433					
NI Women's Coalition	Nuala Bradley	2.08%	236	238.4	241.7	267.75						
Green (NI)	Mary Ringland	0.81%	92	95.3	95.75							
NI Conservatives	Hubert Mullan	0.62%	71	80	80.15							
Electorate: 22,826 Valid: 11,368 (49.80%) Spoilt: 245 Quota: 1,625 Turnout: 11,613 (50.88%)

=== Castle ===
1993: 2 x UUP, 2 SDLP, 1 x DUP, 1 x Independent Unionist
1997: 2 x UUP, 1 x DUP, 1 x SDLP, 1 x Alliance, 1 x Sinn Féin
1993-1997 Change: Alliance and Sinn Féin gain from UUP and SDLP, Independent Unionist joins UUP

Castle - 6 seats
Party	Candidate	FPv%	Count							
Party	Candidate	FPv%	1	2	3	4	5	6	7	8
DUP	Nigel Dodds*	17.41%	2,081							
SDLP	Alban Maginness*	14.90%	1,781							
Alliance	Tom Campbell	11.86%	1,417	1,420.06	1,423.46	1,518.18	1,527.68	1,917.68		
Sinn Féin	Danny Lavery	11.40%	1,362	1,362.18	1,368.38	1,397.74	1,397.92	1,616.08	1,619.28	1,715.28
UUP	David Browne*	9.49%	1,134	1,169.1	1,169.18	1,192.54	1,300.26	1,301.62	1,633.3	1,638.3
UUP	Nelson McCausland*	8.91%	1,065	1,114.86	1,114.9	1,124.26	1,253.26	1,256.62	1,456.04	1,462.04
UUP	John Carson*	8.58%	1,025	1,060.28	1,060.52	1,073.52	1,169.38	1,192.62	1,390.04	1,430.04
PUP	Jim Crothers	6.51%	778	797.8	797.8	821.2	911.18	920.46		
SDLP	Jonathan Stevenson*	6.02%	720	720	777.92	832.48	832.48			
DUP	Robert Ferris	0.71%	85	304.96	304.96	309.14				
Ulster Democratic	Raymond Gilliland	1.81%	216	220.14	220.14	224.32				
NI Women's Coalition	Eileen Calder	1.25%	149	150.08	151.12					
Green (NI)	Alan Warren	0.61%	73	73	73.24					
Workers' Party	Paul Treanor	0.44%	53	53.18	53.9					
Ulster Independence	Norman McClelland	0.01%	8	8.18	8.18					
Natural Law	Andrea Gribben	0.01%	5	5	5.04					
Electorate: 21,949 Valid: 11,952 (54.45%) Spoilt: 288 Quota: 1,708 Turnout: 12,240 (55.77%)

=== Court ===
1993: 2 x UUP, 1 x DUP, 1 x PUP, 1 x Independent Unionist
1997: 2 x UUP, 1 x PUP, 1 x DUP, 1 x UDP
1993-1997 Change: UDP gain from Independent Unionist

Court - 5 seats
Party	Candidate	FPv%	Count							
Party	Candidate	FPv%	1	2	3	4	5	6	7	8
PUP	Hugh Smyth*	32.83%	3,070							
DUP	Eric Smyth*	16.82%	1,573							
Ulster Democratic	Frank McCoubrey	12.83%	1,200	1,545.28	1,552.32	1,553.48	1,581.48			
UUP	Fred Cobain*	11.21%	1,048	1,240.92	1,248.52	1,249.78	1,297.29	1,326.32	1,369.48	1,699.48
UUP	Chris McGimpsey*	8.56%	800	1,039.2	1,053.28	1,054.7	1,088.81	1,121.22	1,184.77	1,362.25
Ind. Unionist	Joseph Coggle*	4.35%	407	755.92	763.04	764.22	838.38	868.22	936.49	1,084.08
UUP	Glenn Bradley	5.49%	513	617	627.6	628.27	662.05	679.85	839.12	
UUP	Denis Robinson	2.53%	237	349.84	350.84	351.62	372.7	405.17		
NI Women's Coalition	Linda Walker	1.60%	150	208.76	308.52	309.02	325.22			
DUP	Margaret Ferris	2.22%	208	291.72	296.76	303.48				
Alliance	John Roberts	1.54%	144	165.32						
Electorate: 17,089 Valid: 9,350 (54.71%) Spoilt: 243 Quota: 1,559 Turnout: 9,593 (56.14%)

=== Laganbank ===
1993: 2 x UUP, 2 x SDLP, 1 x Alliance
1997: 2 x UUP, 1 x SDLP, 1 x Sinn Féin, 1 x Alliance
1993-1997 Change: Sinn Féin gain from SDLP

Laganbank - 5 seats
Party	Candidate	FPv%	Count						
Party	Candidate	FPv%	1	2	3	4	5	6	7
SDLP	Alasdair McDonnell*	17.59%	1,614						
UUP	Jim Clarke*	14.57%	1,337	1,339	1,343	1,343	1,554		
UUP	Michael McGimpsey*	10.53%	966	966	974	974.1	1,141.1	1,158.2	1,594.2
Sinn Féin	Sean Hayes	15.13%	1,388	1,388	1,402	1,408.25	1,408.25	1,456.4	1,461.45
Alliance	Steve McBride*	12.18%	1,118	1,120	1,186	1,192.4	1,198.4	1,399.2	1,458.25
SDLP	Peter O'Reilly*	9.83%	902	906	957	1,018.05	1,018.05	1,148.5	1,166.5
PUP	Ernie Purvis	7.02%	644	645	659	659.35	716.35	744.35	
NI Women's Coalition	Annie Campbell	4.42%	406	413	484	486.95	488.95		
DUP	Jim Kirkpatrick*	5.15%	473	475	477	477.05			
Workers' Party	Paddy Lynn	1.74%	160	161					
Green (NI)	Andrew Frew	1.50%	138	145					
Natural Law	James Anderson	0.02%	18						
Independent	Vincent McKenna	0.01%	12						
Electorate: 19,797 Valid: 9,176 (46.35%) Spoilt: 243 Quota: 1,530 Turnout: 9,419 (47.58%)

=== Lower Falls ===
1993: 4 x Sinn Féin, 1 x SDLP
1997: 4 x Sinn Féin, 1 x SDLP
1993-1997 Change: No change

Lower Falls - 5 seats
Party	Candidate	FPv%	Count			
Party	Candidate	FPv%	1	2	3	4
Sinn Féin	Fra McCann*	19.65%	2,420			
Sinn Féin	Sean McKnight	18.56%	2,286			
SDLP	Margaret Walsh	14.32%	1,764	1,775.4	2,248.7	
Sinn Féin	Tom Hartley*	16.42%	2,022	2,047.05	2,061.05	
Sinn Féin	Marie Moore*	14.70%	1,810	1,822.15	1,829.15	2,033.65
Sinn Féin	Janice Austin	10.34%	1,274	1,581.35	1,606.25	1,625.75
Workers' Party	John Lowry	3.80%	468	468.75		
SDLP	Mary White	1.84%	227	227.9		
Alliance	Keith Jacques	0.37%	45	45.3		
Electorate: 19,372 Valid: 12,316 (63.58%) Spoilt: 390 Quota: 2,053 Turnout: 12,706 (65.59%)

=== Oldpark ===
1993: 3 x Sinn Féin, 2 x UUP, 1 x SDLP
1997: 3 x Sinn Féin, 1 x SDLP, 1 x UUP, 1 x PUP
1993-1997 Change: PUP gain from UUP

Oldpark - 6 seats
Party	Candidate	FPv%	Count									
Party	Candidate	FPv%	1	2	3	4	5	6	7	8	9	10
Sinn Féin	Mick Conlon	16.40%	2,317									
Sinn Féin	Bobby Lavery*	15.79%	2,230									
Sinn Féin	Paddy McManus*	12.55%	1,773	2,034								
SDLP	Martin Morgan*	13.74%	1,941	1,949.28	2,082.12							
PUP	Billy Hutchinson	11.20%	1,582	1,582.12	1,583.2	1,583.36	1,592.36	1,613.36	1,658.9	1,879.9	1,924.84	2,070.84
UUP	Fred Proctor*	9.32%	1,316	1,316	1,316	1,316	1,316	1,340	1,361	1,431	1,447.8	1,675.8
UUP	Fred Rodgers*	8.13%	986	986	986	986	986	1,004	1,031	1,082	1,096.83	1,397.69
DUP	David Smylie	4.66%	659	659	659	659	659	659	674	737	743.86	
SDLP	Dympna O'Hara	2.58%	365	366.92	402.83	462.51	505.35	561.57	645.27	646.27		
Ulster Democratic	Paddy Bird	3.02%	427	427	427.27	427.27	429.39	434.39	451.39			
Green (NI)	Peter Emerson	1.73%	245	246.8	273.8	275.08	286.56	333.72				
Alliance	Mark Long	1.25%	177	177.36	179.79	181.23	198.47					
Workers' Party	Steven Doran	0.77%	109	110.92	119.83	120.31						
Electorate: 25,054 Valid: 14,127 (56.39%) Spoilt: 458 Quota: 2,019 Turnout: 14,585 (58.21%)

=== Pottinger ===
1993: 3 x DUP, 2 x UUP, 1 x Alliance
1997: 2 x DUP, 2 x UUP, 1 x PUP, 1 x Alliance
1993-1997 Change: PUP gain from DUP

Pottinger - 6 seats
Party	Candidate	FPv%	Count											
Party	Candidate	FPv%	1	2	3	4	5	6	7	8	9	10	11	12
UUP	Reg Empey*	20.32%	2,309											
DUP	Sammy Wilson*	19.94%	2,265											
PUP	David Ervine	18.57%	2,110											
UUP	Margaret Clarke	6.76%	768	1,265.55	1,309.63	1,340.83	1,345	1,347.62	1,358.2	1,385.31	1,387.1	1,625.38		
DUP	Robert Cleland*	5.33%	605	636.62	822.22	847.18	852.58	852.58	856.87	889.14	889.43	928.08	1,324.88	1,536.14
Alliance	Mervyn Jones*	7.66%	870	886.74	892.83	906.51	913.8	937.04	1,004.94	1,013.63	1,218.16	1,237.87	1,241.33	1,306.26
Sinn Féin	Dominic Corr	8.61%	978	978	978	978	978	992	996	996	1,100.29	1,100.29	1,100.29	1,102.25
PUP	Alexander Gordon	2.31%	262	281.84	298.37	615.65	622.49	625.97	641.61	692.25	699.49	723.33	763.61	
DUP	Frank Leslie	1.25%	142	160.91	487.45	504.49	506.78	506.78	510.91	545.02	546.02	567.76		
UUP	Alexander Blair*	2.21%	251	320.75	338.73	356.49	360.07	372.31	377.1	395.04	398.35			
SDLP	Marga Foley	2.72%	309	310.55	311.42	312.14	315.14	349.14	384.38	384.38				
Ulster Democratic	Robert Girvan	1.49%	169	188.53	210.57	255.69	263.55	267.03	271.03					
NI Women's Coalition	Pearl Sagar	1.31%	149	151.48	153.22	160.66	173.95	182.43						
Workers' Party	Joseph Bell	1.01%	115	115.62	115.91	118.79	124.34							
Ulster Independence	Josephine Challis	0.18%	21	23.48	24.93	26.13								
Labour Coalition	Sean McGouran	0.17%	19	19	20.45	20.69								
Natural Law	David Collins	0.17%	19	19.31	19.6	19.84								
Electorate: 21,854 Valid: 12,968 (59.34%) Spoilt: 458 Quota: 1,853 Turnout: 13,426 (61.43%)

=== Upper Falls ===
1993: 3 x Sinn Féin, 2 x SDLP
1997: 4 x Sinn Féin, 1 x SDLP
1993-1997 Change: Sinn Féin gain from SDLP

Upper Falls - 5 seats
Party	Candidate	FPv%	Count			
Party	Candidate	FPv%	1	2	3	4
SDLP	Alex Attwood*	20.42%	2,855			
Sinn Féin	Alex Maskey*	20.08%	2,807			
Sinn Féin	Michael Browne	18.45%	2,580			
Sinn Féin	Martin Livingstone	17.12%	2,394			
Sinn Féin	Chrissie McAuley	12.43%	1,738	1,754.02	2,181.23	2,401.37
SDLP	Patricia Lewsley*	4.26%	596	982.82	998.63	1,003.22
SDLP	Stephen McGowan	4.41%	616	707.98	719.54	721.7
DUP	David McNerlin	1.44%	201	201	201.17	201.26
Workers' Party	James McAllister	0.79%	110	113.96	117.7	119.23
Alliance	Dan McGuinness	0.61%	85	91.3	93.34	93.61
Electorate: 22,561 Valid: 13,982 (61.97%) Spoilt: 345 Quota: 2,331 Turnout: 14,327 (63.50%)

=== Victoria ===
1993: 3 x UUP, 2 x Alliance, 2 x DUP
1997: 2 x UUP, 2 x Alliance, 2 x DUP, 1 x Independent Unionist
1993-1997 Change: Independent Unionist gain from UUP

Victoria - 7 seats
Party	Candidate	FPv%	Count								
Party	Candidate	FPv%	1	2	3	4	5	6	7	8	9
Alliance	David Alderdice	18.87%	2,419								
UUP	Ian Adamson*	18.46%	2,367								
Alliance	Danny Dow*	7.99%	1,024	1,609.14							
UUP	Jim Rodgers*	11.76%	1,508	1,532.14	1,921.58						
DUP	Wallace Browne*	11.58%	1,485	1,498.94	1,564.54	1,569.22	1,590.52	1,747.52			
DUP	Robin Newton*	8.08%	1,036	1,044.5	1,052.82	1,055.94	1,070.52	1,336.04	1,477.94	1,522.22	1,658.22
Ind. Unionist	Alan Crowe	4.05%	519	544.16	710.24	736.5	803.68	831.18	1,023.4	1,237.5	1,242.5
PUP	John McQuillan	7.14%	915	924.86	937.98	940.32	956.96	1,001.88	1,040.16	1,149.92	1,151.92
Alliance	Glyn Roberts	4.31%	553	675.74	698.78	702.94	761.48	771.26	842.62		
UUP	Peter Weir	1.50%	192	196.76	245.72	509.88	569.64	582.76			
DUP	Margaret McKenzie	4.08%	523	524.36	533	535.08	558.74				
NI Conservatives	Lesley Donaldson	2.00%	256	270.96	293.04	295.9					
Natural Law	Thomas Mullins	0.19%	25	27.38	27.7	27.96					
Electorate: 28,936 Valid: 12,822 (44.31%) Spoilt: 351 Quota: 1,603 Turnout: 13,173 (45.52%)
