= 2005 Belfast City Council election =

Local election in Northern Ireland

- 5 May 2005

All 51 seats to Belfast City Council 26 seats needed for a majority
	First party	Second party	Third party
Party	DUP	Sinn Féin	SDLP
Seats won	15	14	8
Seat change	▲5	0	▼1
	Fourth party	Fifth party	Sixth party
Party	UUP	Alliance	PUP
Seats won	7	4	2
Seat change	▼4	▲1	▼1
	Seventh party
Party	Independent
Seats won	1
Seat change	0
- 2005 Belfast City Council Election Results, shaded by First Preference Votes.
Lord Mayor before election
Tom Ekin
Alliance
Lord Mayor
Wallace Browne
DUP

Elections to Belfast City Council were held on 5 May 2005 on the same day as the other Northern Irish local government elections. The election used nine district electoral areas to elect a total of 51 councillors, most representing the more heavily populated north and west.

The DUP emerged as the largest party, and Wallace Browne became Lord Mayor.

== Election results ==
Belfast local election result 2005
Party	Seats	Gains	Losses	Net gain/loss	Seats %	Votes %	Votes	+/−
DUP	15	5	0	▲5	29.4	25.8	25,722	▲7.7
Sinn Féin	14	1	1	0	27.5	30.6	30,531	▲2.2
SDLP	8	0	1	▼1	15.7	17.1	17,058	▼0.3
UUP	7	5	1	▼4	13.7	13.8	13,756	▼4.5
Alliance	4	1	0	▲1	7.8	6.8	6,808	0.0
PUP	2	0	1	▼1	3.9	2.7	2,713	▼3.1
Independent	1	0	0	0	2.0	1.0	1,007	▼2.0
Green (NI)	0	0	0	0	0.0	0.8	801	New
Workers' Party	0	0	0	0	0.0	0.7	698	0.0
Socialist Party	0	0	0	0	0.0	0.3	338	New
NI Conservatives	0	0	0	0	0.0	0.2	243	0.0

Note: "Votes" are the first preference votes.

== Districts summary ==
Results of the Belfast City Council election, 2005 by district
Ward	%	Cllrs	%	Cllrs	%	Cllrs	%	Cllrs	%	Cllrs	%	Cllrs	%	Cllrs	Total Cllrs
Ward	DUP		Sinn Féin		SDLP		UUP		Alliance		PUP		Others		Total Cllrs
Balmoral	22.2	2	10.3	0	33.1	2	19.7	1	12.9	1	0.0	0	1.8	0	6
Castle	38.6	2	18.6	1	27.1	2	10.5	1	2.5	0	0.0	0	2.7	0	6
Court	67.7	3	3.3	0	0.0	0	7.7	0	0.0	0	10.7	1	13.9	1	5
Laganbank	15.1	1	17.8	1	31.5	2	18.8	1	9.5	0	0.0	0	7.2	0	5
Lower Falls	0.0	0	85.2	5	11.9	0	0.0	0	0.0	0	0.0	0	3.5	0	5
Oldpark	22.3	1	47.5	3	15.9	1	7.9	1	0.0	0	3.8	0	3.2	0	6
Pottinger	41.7	3	8.9	0	6.3	0	22.0	1	7.5	1	11.0	1	2.5	1	6
Upper Falls	0.0	0	75.2	4	24.8	1	0.0	0	0.0	0	0.0	0	0.0	0	5
Victoria	37.5	3	0.0	0	2.4	0	33.0	2	23.4	2	2.1	0	1.7	0	7
Total	25.8	15	30.6	14	17.1	8	13.8	7	6.8	4	2.7	2	3.2	1	51

== District results ==
=== Balmoral ===
2001: 2 x UUP, 2 x SDLP, 1 x Alliance, 1 x DUP
2005: 2 x SDLP, 1 x DUP, 1 x UUP, 1 x Alliance
2001-2005 Change: DUP gain from UUP

Balmoral - 6 seats
Party	Candidate	FPv%	Count								
Party	Candidate	FPv%	1	2	3	4	5	6	7	8	9
SDLP	Carmel Hanna*	17.34%	2,030								
SDLP	Bernie Kelly	7.09%	906	908	1,137.84	1,949.84					
Alliance	Tom Ekin*	12.88%	1,508	1,524	1,559.19	1,613.31	1,755.9				
UUP	Bob Stoker*	10.08%	1,180	1,288	1,291.93	1,296.74	1,300.17	1,312.42	2,163.42		
DUP	Jim Kirkpatrick	12.58%	1,473	1,484	1,485.19	1,485.19	1,487.15	1,488.13	1,642.79	1,934.39	
DUP	Ruth Patterson*	9.65%	1,130	1,180	1,180.17	1,183.51	1,183.51	1,184	1,261.66	1,452.46	1,706.11
Sinn Féin	Stiofán Long	10.26%	1,202	1,204	1,220.15	1,305.88	1,423.48	1,458.27	1,470.98	1,474.58	1,479.92
UUP	Esmond Birnie	9.61%	1,125	1,137	1,142.95	1,153.16	1,160.51	1,183.05			
SDLP	Mary Kennedy	8.05%	943	943	991.96						
Independent	Thomas Wilson	1.82%	213								
Electorate: 18,382 Valid: 11,710 (63.70%) Spoilt: 192 Quota: 1,673 Turnout: 11,902 (64.75%)

=== Castle ===
2001: 2 x DUP, 2 x SDLP, 1 x Sinn Féin, 1 x UUP
2005: 2 x DUP, 2 x SDLP, 1 x Sinn Féin, 1 x UUP
2001-2005 Change: No change

Castle - 6 seats
Party	Candidate	FPv%	Count						
Party	Candidate	FPv%	1	2	3	4	5	6	7
DUP	Nigel Dodds*	28.96%	3,161						
SDLP	Pat Convery*	16.66%	1,818						
UUP	David Browne*	10.52%	1,148	1,454.51	1,563.59				
SDLP	Cathal Mullaghan	10.41%	1,136	1,139.57	1,408.14	1,614.92			
DUP	Ian Crozier*	4.01%	438	1,390.68	1,408.23	1,408.65	2,010.65		
Sinn Féin	Tierna Cunningham	9.43%	1,029	1,032.06	1,066.06	1,087.34	1,109.25	1,133.25	1,163.17
Sinn Féin	David Kennedy	9.17%	1,001	1,003.04	1,032.55	1,046.41	1,068.4	1,090.4	1,111.4
DUP	Lydia Patterson	5.66%	618	908.7	918.74	919.16			
Alliance	Marjorie Hawkins	2.47%	270	279.69					
Green (NI)	Shane Ó Heorpa	1.68%	183	183.51					
Workers' Party	John Lavery	1.03%	112	117.61					
Electorate: 18,413 Valid: 10,914 (59.27%) Spoilt: 253 Quota: 1,560 Turnout: 11,167 (60.65%)

=== Court ===
2001: 2 x DUP, 1 x UUP, 1 x PUP, 1 x Independent
2005: 3 x DUP, 1 x PUP, 1 x Independent
2001-2005 Change: DUP gain from UUP

Court - 5 seats
Party	Candidate	FPv%	Count				
Party	Candidate	FPv%	1	2	3	4	5
DUP	Diane Dodds	55.73%	4,176				
DUP	William Humphrey	9.06%	679	2,320.52			
DUP	Elaine McMillen*	2.95%	221	730.07	1,577.39		
Independent	Frank McCoubrey*	10.60%	794	1,107.11	1,186.23	1,244.66	1,312.41
PUP	Hugh Smyth*	10.66%	799	1,003.48	1,043.96	1,065.41	1,174.86
UUP	Chris McGimpsey*	7.67%	575	777.35	860.61	903.08	1,022.96
Sinn Féin	Francis Hamilton	3.32%	249	266.04	267.42		
Electorate: 13,582 Valid: 7,493 (55.17%) Spoilt: 233 Quota: 1,249 Turnout: 7,726 (56.88%)

=== Laganbank ===
2001: 2 x SDLP, 2 x UUP, 1 x Sinn Féin,
2005: 2 x SDLP, 1 x UUP, 1 x Sinn Féin, 1 x DUP
2001-2005 Change: DUP gain from UUP

Laganbank - 5 seats
Party	Candidate	FPv%	Count				
Party	Candidate	FPv%	1	2	3	4	5
Sinn Féin	Alex Maskey*	17.77%	1,600				
SDLP	Patrick McCarthy*	16.21%	1,459	1,503.8			
SDLP	Peter O'Reilly*	15.28%	1,376	1,402.6	1,489.47	1,609.47	
UUP	Michael McGimpsey*	14.80%	1,332	1,333.68	1,350.82	1,647.82	
DUP	Christopher Stalford	15.13%	1,362	1,362.07	1,367.07	1,417.28	1,512.44
Alliance	Allan Leonard	9.54%	859	861.94	901.78	1,172.51	1,222.53
Green (NI)	Andrew Frew	4.10%	369	375.16	467.66		
UUP	Paula Bradshaw	4.04%	364	364.28	366.35		
Socialist Party	James Barbour	1.94%	175	181.86			
Workers' Party	Paddy Lynn	1.19%	107	110.01			
Electorate: 15,223 Valid: 9,003 (59.14%) Spoilt: 205 Quota: 1,501 Turnout: 9,208 (60.49%)

=== Lower Falls ===
2001: 4 x Sinn Féin, 1 x SDLP
2005: 5 x Sinn Féin
2001-2005 Change: Sinn Féin gain from SDLP

Lower Falls - 5 seats
Party	Candidate	FPv%	Count			
Party	Candidate	FPv%	1	2	3	4
Sinn Féin	Janice Austin	19.42%	2,071			
Sinn Féin	Fra McCann*	19.17%	2,045			
Sinn Féin	Tom Hartley*	18.39%	1,962			
Sinn Féin	Máire Cush*	15.33%	1,764	1,797		
Sinn Féin	Marie Moore*	11.67%	1,245	1,253	1,528.1	1,764.42
SDLP	Margaret Walsh*	11.86%	1,265	1,439	1,449.95	1,476.27
Workers' Party	John Lowry	2.94%	314			
Electorate: 16,334 Valid: 10,666 (65.30%) Spoilt: 392 Quota: 1,778 Turnout: 11,058 (67.70%)

=== Oldpark ===
2001: 3 x Sinn Féin, 1 x SDLP, 1 x DUP, 1 x PUP
2005: 3 x Sinn Féin, 1 x DUP, 1 x SDLP, 1 x UUP
2001-2005 Change: UUP gain from PUP

Oldpark - 6 seats
Party	Candidate	FPv%	Count						
Party	Candidate	FPv%	1	2	3	4	5	6	7
DUP	Nelson McCausland*	22.27%	2,642						
Sinn Féin	Danny Lavery*	17.64%	2,093						
Sinn Féin	Margaret McClenaghan*	15.42%	1,829						
SDLP	Alban Maginness*	11.90%	1,411	1,418.03	1,450.33	1,538.39	1,549.17	1,966.17	
UUP	Fred Cobain	7.91%	938	1,594.01	1,594.01	1,652.29	1,652.43	1,663.1	1,685.1
Sinn Féin	Caral Ni Chuilin	10.47%	1,242	1,243.48	1,468.63	1,495.01	1,585.31	1,600.85	1,657.85
PUP	Billy Hutchinson*	3.84%	455	690.69	691.45	732.59	732.66	735.22	757.22
Sinn Féin	Marie Mackessy	3.94%	467	468.85	586.08	600.22	622.2	651.74	715.74
SDLP	Andrew Harding	4.01%	476	479.33	487.69	539.44	540.07		
Green (NI)	Peter Emerson	2.10%	249	278.6	280.5				
Workers' Party	Paul Treanor	0.51%	60	60.37	62.08				
Electorate: 22,444 Valid: 11,862 (52.85%) Spoilt: 329 Quota: 1,695 Turnout: 12,191 (59.63%)

=== Pottinger ===
2001: 3 x DUP, 1 x UUP, 1 x PUP, 1 x Alliance
2005: 2 x DUP, 2 x UUP, 1 x PUP, 1 x Sinn Féin
2001-2005 Change: DUP and Alliance gain from UUP and Sinn Féin

Pottinger - 6 seats
Party	Candidate	FPv%	Count					
Party	Candidate	FPv%	1	2	3	4	5	6
DUP	Sammy Wilson*	22.60%	2,385					
UUP	Reg Empey*	18.65%	1,968					
DUP	May Campbell	12.34%	1,302	1,530.29				
PUP	David Ervine*	10.95%	1,156	1,248.87	1,324.71	1,394.99	1,556.39	
DUP	Margaret McKenzie	6.79%	717	1,216.13	1,239.89	1,281.08	1,451.42	1,461.25
Alliance	Máire Hendron	7.53%	795	800.92	830.92	895.09	1,008.55	1,428.28
Sinn Féin	Deborah Devenny	8.94%	944	944	947.84	967.84	969.84	1,126.08
SDLP	Mary Muldoon	6.35%	670	672.22	677.26	743.18	766.22	
UUP	Sonia Copeland	2.62%	277	303.64	524.92	644.92		
Socialist Party	Tommy Black	1.57%	163	165.96	168.36			
Workers' Party	Joseph Bell	0.99%	105	105.74	106.74			
UUP	Henry Wallace	0.68%	72	85.69	180.25			
Electorate: 19,621 Valid: 10,554 (53.79%) Spoilt: 381 Quota: 1,508 Turnout: 10,935 (55.73%)

=== Upper Falls ===
2001: 4 x Sinn Féin, 1 x SDLP
2005: 4 x Sinn Féin, 1 x SDLP
2001-2005 Change: No change

Upper Falls - 5 seats
Party	Candidate	FPv%	Count			
Party	Candidate	FPv%	1	2	3	4
Sinn Féin	Paul Maskey*	23.69%	3,084			
SDLP	Tim Attwood	21.63%	2,815			
Sinn Féin	Gerard O'Neill*	18.81%	2,448			
Sinn Féin	Michael Browne*	17.34%	2,257			
Sinn Féin	Christine Mac Giolla Mhín	10.97%	1,428	2,070.32	2,089.57	2,325.41
SDLP	Roisin Mulholland	3.17%	413	467.56	1,025.56	1,031.83
Sinn Féin	Caoimhín Mac Giolla Mhín	4.39%	571	779.54	843.44	863.79
Electorate: 19,767 Valid: 13,016 (65.85%) Spoilt: 437 Quota: 2,170 Turnout: 13,453 (68.06%)

=== Victoria ===
2001: 3 x UUP, 2 x DUP, 2 x Alliance
2005: 3 x DUP, 2 x UUP, 2 x Alliance
2001-2005 Change: DUP gain from UUP

Victoria - 7 seats
Party	Candidate	FPv%	Count						
Party	Candidate	FPv%	1	2	3	4	5	6	7
DUP	Wallace Browne*	18.60%	2,689						
Alliance	Naomi Long*	17.74%	2,565						
UUP	Jim Rodgers*	16.88%	2,441						
DUP	Robin Newton*	13.86%	2,004						
UUP	Ian Adamson*	12.98%	1,877						
DUP	David Rodway	5.01%	725	1,527.4	1,549.72	1,635.12	1,810.52		
Alliance	Mervyn Jones	5.61%	811	815.42	1,421.47	1,456.75	1,458.85	1,461.82	1,838.82
UUP	Alan Crowe*	3.17%	459	508.98	582.76	1,041.76	1,050.86	1,099.16	1,366.16
SDLP	John Ó Doherty	2.35%	340	343.4	374.09	379.69	379.99	380.14	
PUP	John McQuillan	2.10%	303	310.82	321.36	337.88	340.38	340.89	
NI Conservatives	Peter Gray	1.68%	243	252.52	265.23	287.35	288.45	289.53	
Electorate: 25,058 Valid: 14,457 (57.69%) Spoilt: 349 Quota: 1,808 Turnout: 14,806 (59.09%)
