= Laganbank (District Electoral Area) =

Electoral division in Belfast, Northern Ireland

Coordinates: 54.5832°N 5.9338°W

Laganbank District Electoral Area
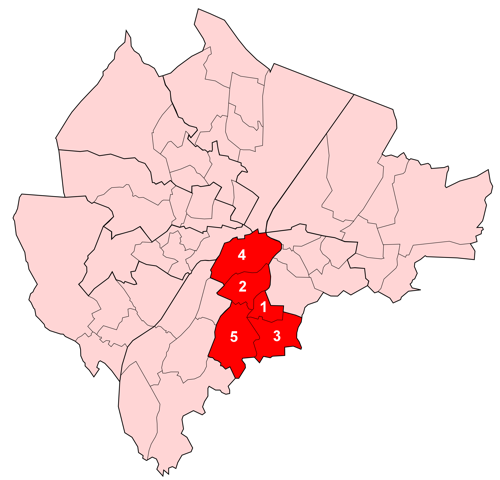
- Map showing Laganbank wards within Belfast
- Area: 8.37 km^{2} (3.23 sq mi)
- Population: 32,316 (2008 estimate)
  - Density: 3,861/km^{2} (10,000/sq mi)
- District: Belfast City Council
- County: County Antrim County Down
- Country: Northern Ireland
- Sovereign state: United Kingdom
- UK Parliament: Belfast South
- NI Assembly: Belfast South

Laganbank was one of the nine district electoral areas in Belfast, Northern Ireland which existed from 1985 to 2014. Located in the south of the city, the district elected five members to Belfast City Council and contained the wards of Ballynafeigh, Botanic, Shaftesbury, Stranmillis, and Rosetta. Laganbank, along with neighbouring Balmoral, formed the greater part of the Belfast South constituencies for the Northern Ireland Assembly and UK Parliament.

The district was bound to the west by the Malone Road and the M1 Motorway, to the south by the River Lagan and the southern section of the Annadale Embankment, to the east by the Ormeau Park and the Ormeau Road and to the north by College Square North and the Cathedral Quarter. The River Lagan, which gave the district its name, flowed through the centre of the district dividing it in two, with Botanic, Shaftesbury and Stranmillis on the western bank and Ballynafeigh and Rosetta on the eastern bank. Laganbank also contained most of the city centre, including Donegall Square.

The south of the district contained some of the most exclusive addresses in Northern Ireland, particularly along the Malone Road. However, the north of the district has areas that suffer economic deprivation, including Donegall Road, Sandy Row and 'the Markets'.

== History ==
Laganbank was created for the 1985 local elections. The Shaftesbury ward had previously been in Area F, Stranmillis and Botanic wards in Area C and Rosetta and Ballynafeigh wards in Area A.

For the 2014 local elections, the district was abolished. With the exception of the Rosetta ward, which joined a new Lisnasharragh District Electoral Area, the district's redrawn wards formed part of a new Botanic District Electoral Area, together with the wards of Blackstaff and Windsor, which had previously been part of Balmoral District Electoral Area

== Education ==
Laganbank was the location for several of the city's most important education establishments, including Queen's University Belfast (which gives its name to the Queen's Quarter), Stranmillis University College and Union Theological College, as well as the College Square campus of Belfast Metropolitan College. The location of these institutions in close proximity saw the area's popularity among students increase, particularly in the Holyland area.

The area was also home to some of the most prominent schools, including Aquinas Diocesan Grammar School, Methodist College Belfast ('Methody') and the Royal Belfast Academical Institution.

== Culture ==
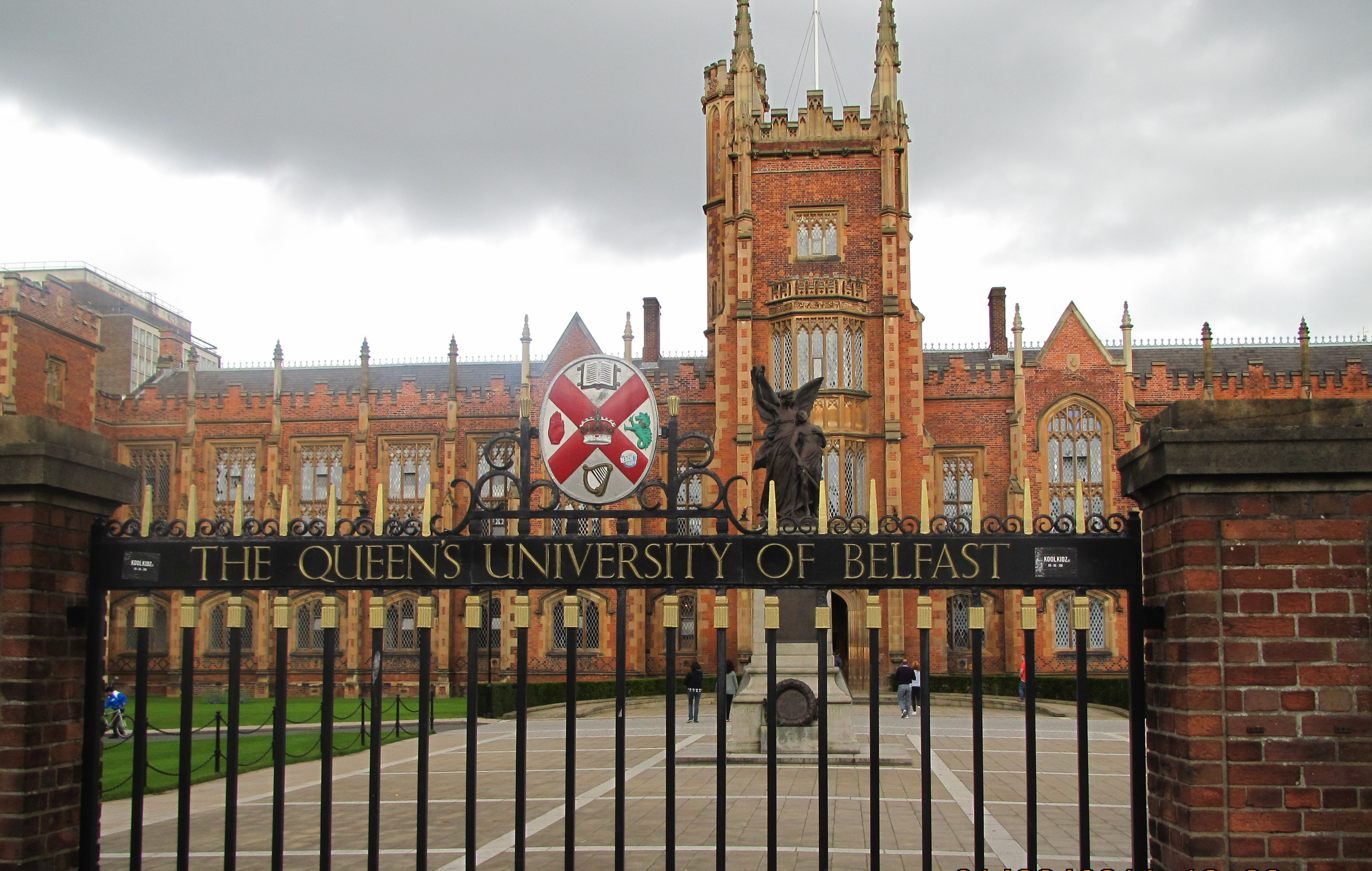
Lanyon Building, Queen's University Belfast

The portion of Laganbank to the west of the River Lagan-based around Queen's University, forms the Queen's Quarter, and contains many of the key cultural facilities within the city. The Quarter is home to the Belfast Festival at Queen's, the largest annual arts festival in Ireland, as well as amenities such as the Botanic Gardens, the Brian Friel Theatre, the Crescent Arts Centre, the Elmwood Hall, the Lyric Theatre, the Naughton Gallery at Queen's, the Queen's Film Theatre and the Ulster Museum.

As well as the Queen's Quarter, there are a number of important cultural attractions within the Laganbank section of the city centre, including the Grand Opera House, the Linen Hall Library, the Ormeau Baths Gallery, the Ulster Hall, the Ulster Orchestra and the Waterfront Hall. This area is also sometimes referred to as the Golden Mile because of the large number of bars, clubs and restaurants located there.

Rosemary Jenkinson wrote the play The Dealer of Ballynafeigh, about a 42-year-old UDF resident of Ballynafeigh and his mother who deal drugs to pay off debts. It was performed at the Keegan Theatre on Church St. in Washington, DC, USA from 17 October to 14 November 2015. The play came in third in the BBC Tony Doyle Awards.

Laganbank has a low White population compared to Belfast and is one of the most ethnically diverse electoral areas in Northern Ireland.

Ethnic Groups Census 2011	White
Laganbank	92.1%
Belfast South Parliament Constituency	94.1%
Belfast	96.7%

Note: There is no ethnic group in the Northern Irish census named White British; instead, there is only an ethnic group named White. This covers people from many different areas including Britain, Mainland Europe, Australia and the US.

== Other amenities ==
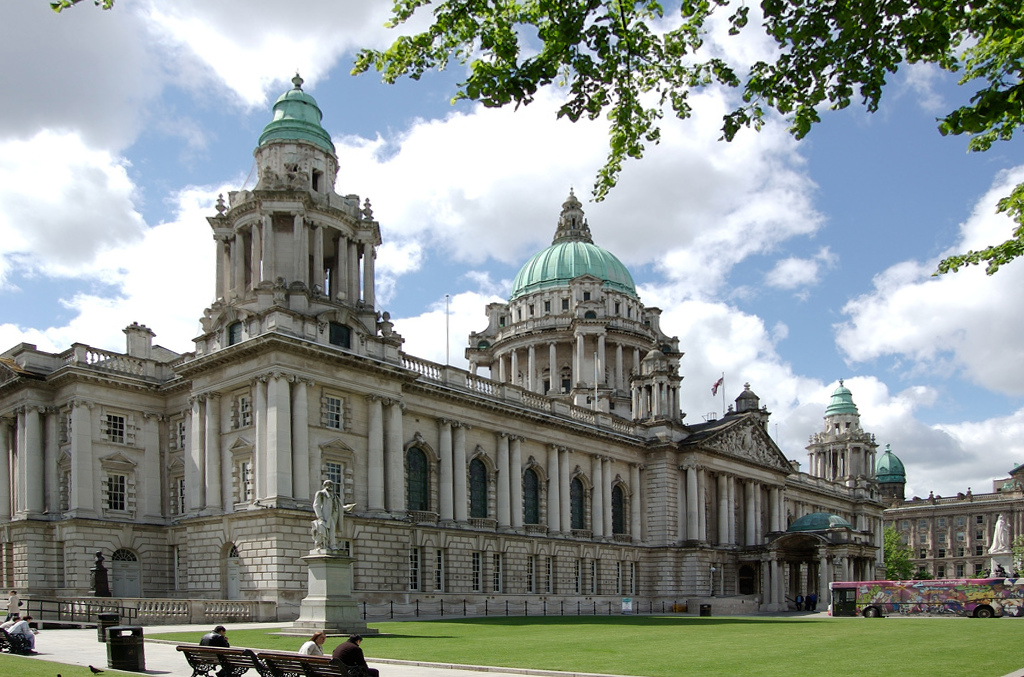
Belfast City Hall

Other noteworthy amenities in the Laganbank district electoral area include:

- Belfast City Hall
- Belfast City Hospital
- Belfast Grand Central, Botanic, Lanyon Place and City Hospital railway stations
- Broadcasting House (BBC Northern Ireland)
- Crown Liquor Saloon
- Europa Hotel
- Havelock House (UTV)
- Queen's University Belfast Students' Union
- Royal Courts of Justice
- St George's Market
- St Malachy's Church
- Victoria Square Shopping Centre
- Windsor House

== Wards ==
Map	Ward	Population (2011 Census)	Catholic	Protestant	Other	No Religion	Area	Density	NI Assembly	UK Parliament	Ref
1	Ballynafeigh	5,928	57.0%	27.1%	2.9%	13.1%	0.67 km^{2}	8,848/km^{2}	Belfast South	Belfast South	
2	Botanic	8,945	60.8%	23.3%	3.9%	12%	1.3 km^{2}	6,881/km^{2}	Belfast South	Belfast South	
3	Rosetta	6,564	59%	30.6%	2%	8.4%	1.6 km^{2}	4,103/km^{2}	Belfast South	Belfast South	
4	Shaftesbury	7,214	35.3%	47.3%	6.7%	10.7%	2.23 km^{2}	3,235/km^{2}	Belfast South	Belfast South	
5	Stranmillis	8,139	47.3%	38.7%	3.1%	11%	2.47 km^{2}	3,295/km^{2}	Belfast South	Belfast South	
Laganbank		36,790	51.9%	33.3%	3.8%	11%	8.27 km^{2}	4,449/km^{2}			

== Councillors ==
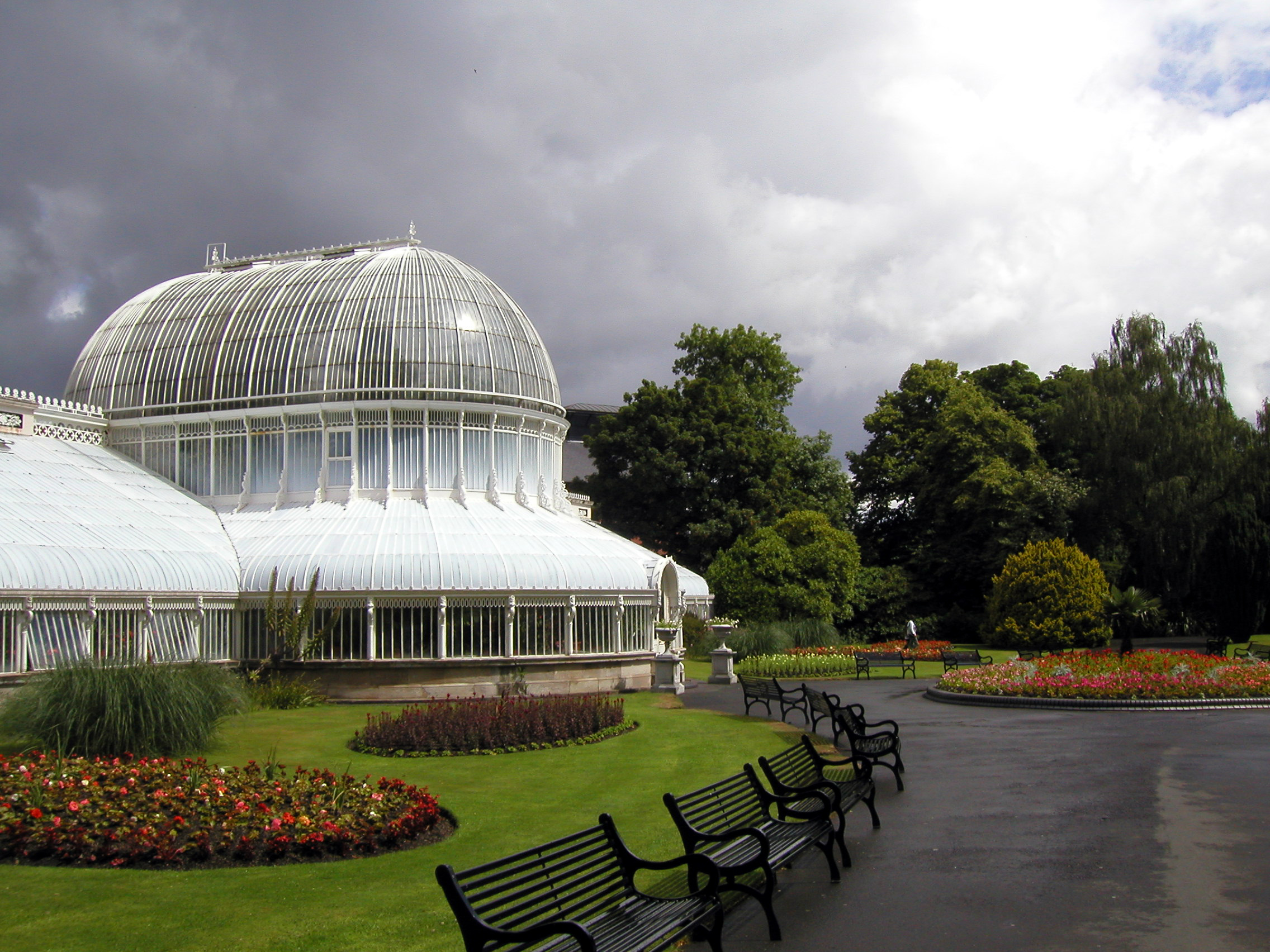
The Palm House, Belfast Botanic Gardens

Election	Councillor (party)	Councillor (party)	Councillor (party)	Councillor (party)	Councillor (party)
2011	Christopher Stalford (DUP)	Catherine Curran (Alliance)	Kate Mullan (SDLP)	Patrick McCarthy (SDLP)	Deirdre Hargey (Sinn Féin)
2005	Christopher Stalford (DUP)	Michael McGimpsey (UUP)	Peter O'Reilly (SDLP)	Patrick McCarthy (SDLP)	Alex Maskey (Sinn Féin)
2001	Jim Clarke (UUP)	Michael McGimpsey (UUP)	Peter O'Reilly (SDLP)	Patrick McCarthy (SDLP)	Alex Maskey (Sinn Féin)
1997	Jim Clarke (UUP)	Michael McGimpsey (UUP)	Steve McBride (Alliance)	Alasdair McDonnell (SDLP)	Sean Hayes (Sinn Féin)
1993	Jim Clarke (UUP)	Michael McGimpsey (UUP)	Steve McBride (Alliance)	Alasdair McDonnell (SDLP)	Peter O'Reilly (SDLP)
1989	Jim Clarke (UUP)	Dixie Gilmore (UUP)	Steve McBride (Alliance)	Alasdair McDonnell (SDLP)	Rhonda Paisley (DUP)
1985	William Blair (UUP)	Dixie Gilmore (UUP)	William McDowell (Alliance)	Alasdair McDonnell (SDLP)	Rhonda Paisley (DUP)

- In May 2011, Christopher Stalford (Democratic Unionist Party) was appointed as an Alderman of Belfast City Council.

== 2011 election ==
2005: 2 x SDLP, 1 x Sinn Féin, 1 x DUP, 1 x UUP

2011: 2 x SDLP, 1 x Sinn Féin, 1 x DUP, 1 x Alliance

2005-2011 change: Alliance gain from UUP

Laganbank - 5 seats
Party	Candidate	FPv%	Count			
Party	Candidate	FPv%	1	2	3	4
Alliance	Catherine Curran	18.95%	1,518			
Sinn Féin	Deirdre Hargey	17.27%	1,383			
SDLP	Patrick McCarthy*	16.99%	1,361			
DUP	Christopher Stalford*	14.06%	1,126	1,138.35	1,148.26	1,168.34
SDLP	Kate Mullan	10.40%	833	893.06	978.44	1,281.83
UUP	Michelle Bostock	11.50%	921	952.46	959.11	1,013.43
Green (NI)	Clare Bailey	6.24%	500	557.59	727.74	
People Before Profit	Mark Hewitt	1.80%	144	152.19		
Socialist Party	Paddy Meehan	1.70%	136	139.25		
Workers' Party	Paddy Lynn	1.10%	88	91.9		
Electorate: 16,314 Valid: 8,010 (49.10%) Spoilt: 171 Quota: 1,336 Turnout: 8,181 (50.15%)

== 2005 election ==
2001: 2 x SDLP, 2 x UUP, 1 x Sinn Féin,

2005: 2 x SDLP, 1 x UUP, 1 x Sinn Féin, 1 x DUP

2001-2005 change: DUP gain from UUP

Laganbank - 5 seats
Party	Candidate	FPv%	Count				
Party	Candidate	FPv%	1	2	3	4	5
Sinn Féin	Alex Maskey*	17.77%	1,600				
SDLP	Patrick McCarthy*	16.21%	1,459	1,503.8			
SDLP	Peter O'Reilly*	15.28%	1,376	1,402.6	1,489.47	1,609.47	
UUP	Michael McGimpsey*	14.80%	1,332	1,333.68	1,350.82	1,647.82	
DUP	Christopher Stalford	15.13%	1,362	1,362.07	1,367.07	1,417.28	1,512.44
Alliance	Allan Leonard	9.54%	859	861.94	901.78	1,172.51	1,222.53
Green (NI)	Andrew Frew	4.10%	369	375.16	467.66		
UUP	Paula Bradshaw	4.04%	364	364.28	366.35		
Socialist Party	James Barbour	1.94%	175	181.86			
Workers' Party	Paddy Lynn	1.19%	107	110.01			
Electorate: 15,223 Valid: 9,003 (59.14%) Spoilt: 205 Quota: 1,501 Turnout: 9,208 (60.49%)

== 2001 election ==
1997: 2 x UUP, 1 x SDLP, 1 x Sinn Féin, 1 x Alliance

2001: 2 x SDLP, 2 x UUP, 1 x Sinn Féin

1997-2001 change: SDLP gain from Alliance

Laganbank - 5 seats
Party	Candidate	FPv%	Count						
Party	Candidate	FPv%	1	2	3	4	5	6	7
UUP	Michael McGimpsey*	18.64%	2,019						
Sinn Féin	Alex Maskey*	16.14%	1,748	1,748.33	1,768.33	1,799.33	1,869.33		
SDLP	Peter O'Reilly	14.88%	1,612	1,614.86	1,624.97	1,663.41	1,865.41		
SDLP	Patrick McCarthy	13.95%	1,511	1,516.06	1,532.06	1,602.94	1,799.04	1,841.04	
UUP	Jim Clarke*	7.56%	819	952.7	954.76	1,083.14	1,118.56	1,118.56	1,839.56
Alliance	Mark Long	7.62%	825	846.67	857.78	929.65	1,149.62	1,159.62	1,195.62
DUP	Richard Scott	8.14%	882	900.48	901.48	993.97	999.08	999.08	
NI Women's Coalition	Anne Monaghan	6.49%	703	709.93	740.93	834.81			
PUP	Dawn Purvis	2.64%	286	302.5	309.61				
Workers' Party	Paddy Lynn	1.46%	158	158.55	173.66				
Independent	Andrew Frew	1.30%	141	143.31	148.31				
Independent	Barbara Muldoon	1.18%	128	128.66					
Electorate: 17,687 Valid: 10,832 (61.24%) Spoilt: 250 Quota: 1,806 Turnout: 11,082 (62.66%)

== 1997 election ==
1993: 2 x UUP, 2 x SDLP, 1 x Alliance

1997: 2 x UUP, 1 x SDLP, 1 x Sinn Féin, 1 x Alliance

1993-1997 change: Sinn Féin gain from SDLP

Laganbank - 5 seats
Party	Candidate	FPv%	Count						
Party	Candidate	FPv%	1	2	3	4	5	6	7
SDLP	Alasdair McDonnell*	17.59%	1,614						
UUP	Jim Clarke*	14.57%	1,337	1,339	1,343	1,343	1,554		
UUP	Michael McGimpsey*	10.53%	966	966	974	974.1	1,141.1	1,158.2	1,594.2
Sinn Féin	Sean Hayes	15.13%	1,388	1,388	1,402	1,408.25	1,408.25	1,456.4	1,461.45
Alliance	Steve McBride*	12.18%	1,118	1,120	1,186	1,192.4	1,198.4	1,399.2	1,458.25
SDLP	Peter O'Reilly*	9.83%	902	906	957	1,018.05	1,018.05	1,148.5	1,166.5
PUP	Ernie Purvis	7.02%	644	645	659	659.35	716.35	744.35	
NI Women's Coalition	Annie Campbell	4.42%	406	413	484	486.95	488.95		
DUP	Jim Kirkpatrick*	5.15%	473	475	477	477.05			
Workers' Party	Paddy Lynn	1.74%	160	161					
Green (NI)	Andrew Frew	1.50%	138	145					
Natural Law	James Anderson	0.02%	18						
Independent	Vincent McKenna	0.01%	12						
Electorate: 19,797 Valid: 9,176 (46.35%) Spoilt: 243 Quota: 1,530 Turnout: 9,419 (47.58%)

== 1993 election ==
1989: 2 x UUP, 1 x SDLP, 1 x Alliance, 1 x DUP

1993: 2 x UUP, 2 x SDLP, 1 x Alliance

1989-1993 change: SDLP gain from DUP

Laganbank - 5 seats
Party	Candidate	FPv%	Count									
Party	Candidate	FPv%	1	2	3	4	5	6	7	8	9	10
UUP	Jim Clarke*	19.44%	1,845									
SDLP	Alasdair McDonnell*	15.80%	1,500	1,500.98	1,508.98	1,530.98	1,533.98	1,571.98	1,644.98			
Alliance	Steve McBride*	8.81%	836	838.66	852.66	867.66	897.08	935.08	992.22	999.22	1,631.22	
SDLP	Peter O'Reilly	11.08%	1,052	1,052	1,058	1,067	1,067	1,086	1,112	1,139	1,200.42	1,490.42
UUP	Michael McGimpsey	5.74%	545	731.9	745.74	747.74	823	832.56	1,075.54	1,075.54	1,133.74	1,136.74
DUP	Caroline Bingham	10.54%	1,000	1,020.44	1,023.58	1,023.72	1,037.28	1,045.28	1,068.1	1,068.1	1,081.1	1,084.8
Sinn Féin	Sean Hayes	9.40%	892	892	892	900	900	907	926	930	931	
Alliance	Hugh Greer	7.66%	727	734.42	744.7	755.7	780.84	834.98	868.54	870.54		
UUP	Dennis Rogan	2.49%	236	261.48	262.76	262.76	300.14	303.28				
Workers' Party	Paddy Lynn	2.34%	222	222.14	239.14	265.42	265.42	290.42				
Green (NI)	Andrew Frew	2.13%	202	203.12	211.68	243.68	244.82					
NI Conservatives	Graham Montgomery	2.09%	198	203.04	204.04	205.04						
Independent Labour	Peter Hadden	1.50%	142	142.42	150.42							
Democratic Left	Michael Craig	1.00%	95	97.1								
Electorate: 20,008 Valid: 9,492 (47.44%) Spoilt: 313 Quota: 1,583 Turnout: 9,805 (49.01%)

== 1989 election ==
1985: 2 x UUP, 1 x SDLP, 1 x Alliance, 1 x DUP

1989: 2 x UUP, 1 x SDLP, 1 x Alliance, 1 x DUP

1985-1989 change: No change

Laganbank - 5 seats
Party	Candidate	FPv%	Count								
Party	Candidate	FPv%	1	2	3	4	5	6	7	8	9
SDLP	Alasdair McDonnell*	14.43%	1,415	1,424	1,440	1,558	2,134				
UUP	Dixie Gilmore*	15.25%	1,496	1,497	1,567	1,579	1,579	1,580	2,080		
Alliance	Steve McBride	11.29%	1,107	1,110	1,147	1,243	1,282	1,490	1,497	1,500.84	1,602.84
UUP	Jim Clarke	8.71%	854	859	901	903	903	903	1,128	1,445.76	1,448.76
DUP	Rhonda Paisley*	10.56%	1,036	1,037	1,171	1,179	1,180	1,180	1,278	1,346.16	1,349.16
Alliance	Mary Thomas	7.70%	755	757	780	898	937	1,126	1,130	1,131.92	1,209.92
Sinn Féin	James Clinton	7.68%	753	775	776	799	811	836	837	837.96	
UUP	Harry Fletcher	7.68%	753	753	813	816	816	816			
SDLP	Gerard McKettrick	6.41%	629	635	638	700					
Workers' Party	Kevin Smyth	4.88%	479	503	553						
Ind. Unionist	Margaret Dickson	2.02%	198	198							
DUP	Benjamin Horan	1.35%	132	133							
Labour '87	Paul Hainsworth	1.11%	109	123							
Communist	Barry Bruton	0.93%	91								
Electorate: 20,689 Valid: 9,807 (47.40%) Spoilt: 372 Quota: 1,635 Turnout: 10,179 (49.20%)

== 1985 election ==
1985: 2 x UUP, 1 x DUP, 1 x SDLP, 1 x Alliance

Laganbank - 5 seats
Party	Candidate	FPv%	Count								
Party	Candidate	FPv%	1	2	3	4	5	6	7	8	9
UUP	William Blair*	17.92%	1,969								
Alliance	William McDowell	12.97%	1,425	1,456	1,808	1,811.15	1,841.15				
SDLP	Alasdair McDonnell*	10.69%	1,175	1,194	1,220	1,220.35	1,448.35	1,449.56	1,797.63	2,727.63	
UUP	Dixie Gilmore	6.62%	727	733	741	841.8	844.94	1,358.26	1,387.61	1,398.61	1,513.61
DUP	Rhonda Paisley	12.06%	1,325	1,334	1,338	1,344.51	1,344.51	1,408.98	1,419.33	1,419.33	1,427.33
DUP	Raymond McCrea*	10.03%	1,102	1,107	1,108	1,116.61	1,117.61	1,146.52	1,152.59	1,152.59	1,160.59
SDLP	Gerard McKettrick	7.58%	833	844	876	876	949	949	1,068		
Workers' Party	Gerard Carr	5.01%	550	635	655	656.19	755.26	757.33			
UUP	Robert Wilson	5.50%	604	615	617	632.47	632.54				
Sinn Féin	Michael Conlon	5.59%	614	624	627	627.35					
Alliance	Dan McGuinness	3.95%	434	455							
Labour and Trade Union	Robert Millar	0.91%	100								
NI Labour	John King	0.66%	73								
Communist	Michael Morrissey	0.52%	57								
Electorate: 20,934 Valid: 10,988 (52.49%) Spoilt: 297 Quota: 1,832 Turnout: 11,285 (53.91%)

== See also ==
- Belfast City Council
- Electoral wards of Belfast
- Laganside Corporation
- Local government in Northern Ireland
- Members of Belfast City Council
