= Lydia Patterson =

Former High Sheriff of Belfast

High Sheriff of Belfast
- In office 17 January 2014 – January 2015
- Preceded by: Brian Kingston
- Succeeded by: Gareth McKee

Member of Belfast City Council
- In office 4 May 2010 – 2 May 2019
- Preceded by: Nigel Dodds
- Succeeded by: Fred Cobain
- Constituency: Castle

Personal details
- Born: February 1958; Belfast, Northern Ireland
- Died: 1 February 2025 (aged 66-67)
- Political party: DUP

Sarah Lydia Patterson (born February 1958 - 1 February 2025) was a Democratic Unionist Party (DUP) politician who was High Sheriff of Belfast from January 2014 to 2015, and a Belfast City Councillor for the Castle DEA from 2010 to 2019.

== Background ==
Patterson was an unsuccessful Democratic Unionist Party (DUP) candidate at the 2005 City Council election, running in the Castle District. She was later co-opted to the council in May 2010, succeeding long-serving Castle representative, Nigel Dodds. She was re-elected in 2011.

In November 2013, Patterson was nominated to be the next High Sheriff of Belfast, taking office in January 2014. She was subsequently re-elected in the May 2014 Council election.
