= Oldpark (District Electoral Area) =

Electoral division in Belfast, Northern Ireland

- Belfast City Council DEA constituency
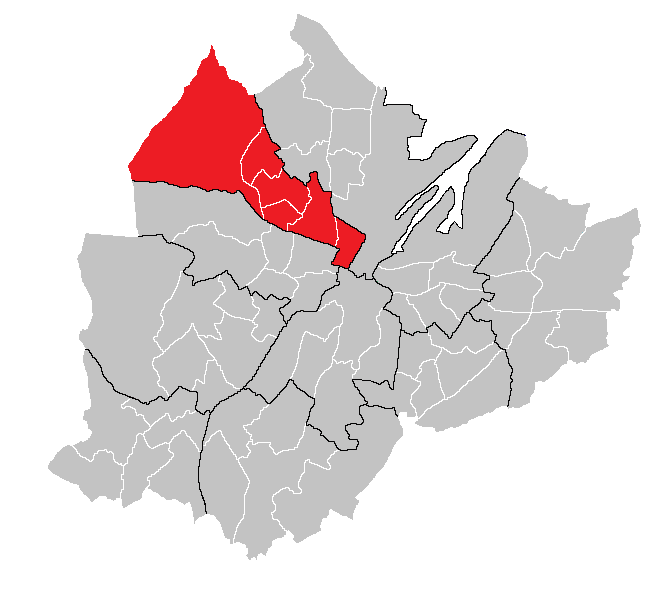
- Oldpark DEA marked on a map of Belfast City Council and its wards

Current constituency
- Created: 2014
- Seats: 6 (2014–)
- Councillors: Nichola Bradley (SF); Jordan Doran (DUP); JJ Magee (SF); Paul McCusker (IND); Ryan Murphy (SF); Tomás Ó Néill (SF)

Oldpark DEA (1993-2014) within Belfast

Oldpark is one of the ten district electoral areas (DEA) in Belfast, Northern Ireland. Located in the north of the city, the district elects six members to Belfast City Council and contains the wards of Ardoyne; Ballysillan; Cliftonville; Legoniel; New Lodge and Water Works. Oldpark forms part of the Belfast North constituency for the Northern Ireland Assembly and UK Parliament.

== History ==
The DEA was created for the 1985 local elections. Legoniel, Ballysillan and Ardoyne wards had previously been part of Area E, New Lodge and the southern half of the Waterworks ward had been in Area G, while Cliftonville and the northern half of Waterworks ward had been in Area H.

== Wards ==
Map	Ward	Population (2011 Census)	Catholic	Protestant	Other	No Religion	Area	Density	NI Assembly	UK Parliament	Ref
1	Ardoyne	5,987	92.8%	5.1%	0.3%	1.8%	0.58 km^{2}	10,322 /km^{2}	Belfast North	Belfast North	
2	Ballysillan	5,626	7.8%	83.3%	1.4%	7.5%	1.11 km^{2}	5,068 /km^{2}	Belfast North	Belfast North	
3	Cliftonville	5,330	71%	23.6%	0.7%	4.7%	1.18 km^{2}	4,517 /km^{2}	Belfast North	Belfast North	
4	Legoniel	6,409	48.2%	45.4%	0.8%	5.6%	8.82 km^{2}	727 /km^{2}	Belfast North	Belfast North	
5	New Lodge	4,950	89.2%	7.5%	0.9%	2.3%	0.72 km^{2}	6,875 /km^{2}	Belfast North	Belfast North	
6	Water Works	5,829	87.6%	7.1%	0.9%	4.4%	1.27 km^{2}	4,590 /km^{2}	Belfast North	Belfast North	
Oldpark		34,131	65.6%	29.2%	0.8%	4.4%	13.68 km^{2}	2,495 /km^{2}	Belfast North	Belfast North	

== Councillors ==
Election	Councillor (Party)	Councillor (Party)	Councillor (Party)	Councillor (Party)	Councillor (Party)	Councillor (Party)
2023	JJ Magee (Sinn Féin)	Ryan Murphy (Sinn Féin)	Nichola Bradley (Sinn Féin)	Paul McCusker (Independent)/ (SDLP)	Tomás Ó Néill (Sinn Féin)	Jordan Doran (DUP)
March 2023 Defection	JJ Magee (Sinn Féin)	Ryan Murphy (Sinn Féin)	Nichola Bradley (Sinn Féin)	Paul McCusker (Independent)/ (SDLP)	Fiona Ferguson (PBP)	Jordan Doran (DUP)
January 2023 Co-Option	JJ Magee (Sinn Féin)	Ryan Murphy (Sinn Féin)	Nichola Bradley (Sinn Féin)	Paul McCusker (Independent)/ (SDLP)	Fiona Ferguson (PBP)	Jordan Doran (DUP)
September 2020 Co-Option	JJ Magee (Sinn Féin)	Ryan Murphy (Sinn Féin)	Nichola Bradley (Sinn Féin)	Paul McCusker (Independent)/ (SDLP)	Fiona Ferguson (PBP)	Dale Pankhurst (DUP)
2019	JJ Magee (Sinn Féin)	Ryan Murphy (Sinn Féin)	Shauneen Baker (Sinn Féin)	Paul McCusker (Independent)/ (SDLP)	Fiona Ferguson (PBP)	Dale Pankhurst (DUP)
January 2018 Co-Options	JJ Magee (Sinn Féin)	Ryan Murphy (Sinn Féin)	Mary Clarke (Sinn Féin)	Paul McCusker (Independent)/ (SDLP)	Julie-Anne Corr (PUP)	Dale Pankhurst (DUP)
May 2016 Co-Option	JJ Magee (Sinn Féin)	Gerry McCabe (Sinn Féin)	Mary Clarke (Sinn Féin)	Paul McCusker (Independent)/ (SDLP)	Julie-Anne Corr (PUP)	Gareth McKee (DUP)
2014	JJ Magee (Sinn Féin)	Gerry McCabe (Sinn Féin)	Mary Clarke (Sinn Féin)	Nichola Mallon (SDLP)	Julie-Anne Corr (PUP)	Gareth McKee (DUP)
2011	Danny Lavery (Sinn Féin)	Gerry McCabe (Sinn Féin)	Conor Maskey (Sinn Féin)	Nichola Mallon (SDLP)	Ian Crozier (DUP)	Gareth McKee (DUP)
2005	Danny Lavery (Sinn Féin)	Margaret McClenaghan (Sinn Féin)	Caral Ni Chuilin (Sinn Féin)	Alban Maginness (SDLP)	Fred Cobain (UUP)	Nelson McCausland (DUP)
2001	Gerard Brophy (Sinn Féin)	Margaret McClenaghan (Sinn Féin)	Eoin O'Broin (Sinn Féin)	Martin Morgan (SDLP)	Billy Hutchinson (PUP)	Nelson McCausland (DUP)
1997	Bobby Lavery (Sinn Féin)	Paddy McManus (Sinn Féin)	Mick Conlon (Sinn Féin)	Martin Morgan (SDLP)	Billy Hutchinson (PUP)	Fred Proctor (UUP)
1993	Bobby Lavery (Sinn Féin)	Paddy McManus (Sinn Féin)	Joe Austin (Sinn Féin)	Martin Morgan (SDLP)	Fred Rodgers (UUP)	Fred Proctor (UUP)
1989	Gerard McGuigan (Sinn Féin)	Paddy McManus (Sinn Féin)	Seamus Lynch (Workers' Party)	Brian Feeney (SDLP)	William Gault (UUP)	Fred Proctor (UUP)
1985	Gerard McGuigan (Sinn Féin)	Bobby Lavery (Sinn Féin)	Seamus Lynch (Workers' Party)	Brian Feeney (SDLP)	Peter Lunn (DUP)	Fred Proctor (UUP)

== 2023 Election ==
2019: 3 x Sinn Féin, 1 x SDLP, 1 x DUP, 1 x People Before Profit

2023: 4 x Sinn Féin, 1 x DUP, 1 x Independent

2019–2023 Change: Sinn Féin gain from People Before Profit, Independent leaves SDLP

Oldpark - 6 seats
Party	Candidate	FPv%	Count						
Party	Candidate	FPv%	1	2	3	4	5	6	7
Sinn Féin	Nichola Bradley*	15.12%	1,870						
Independent	Paul McCusker*	14.13%	1,747	1,764.05	1,835.05				
Sinn Féin	JJ Magee*	13.09%	1,619	1,637.15	1,665.60	1,668.60	1,714.05	1,714.05	1,877.05
Sinn Féin	Ryan Murphy*	11.56%	1,430	1,472.70	1,493.95	1,497.95	1,524.05	1,526.05	1,704.40
DUP	Jordan Doran*	10.21%	1,263	1,263.00	1,273.05	1,273.05	1,310.05	1,606.05	1,634.10
Sinn Féin	Tomás Ó Néill	10.76%	1,330	1,335.35	1,353.45	1,367.45	1,402.70	1,404.70	1,601.55
DUP	Gillian Simpson	7.43%	919	919.00	924.00	924.00	962.00	1,232.00	1,260.00
People Before Profit	Fiona Ferguson*	5.66%	700	704.65	830.85	849.85	1,114.15	1,125.15	
TUV	Ann McClure	4.81%	595	595.00	604.00	604.00	624.00		
Alliance	Chris Shannon	3.66%	453	453.75	578.45	597.45			
SDLP	Charlotte Carson	1.98%	245	248.55					
Green (NI)	Ange Cruz	1.20%	149	149.35					
Workers' Party	Fiona McCarthy	0.37%	46	46.30					
Electorate: 23,871 Valid: 12,366 (51.80%) Spoilt: 193 Quota: 1,767 Turnout: 12,559 (52.61%)

== 2019 Election ==
2014: 3 × Sinn Féin, 1 × SDLP, 1 × DUP, 1 × PUP

2019: 3 × Sinn Féin, 1 × SDLP, 1 × DUP, 1 × People Before Profit

2014-2019 Change: People Before Profit gain from PUP

Oldpark - 6 seats
Party	Candidate	FPv%	Count									
Party	Candidate	FPv%	1	2	3	4	5	6	7	8	9	10
SDLP	Paul McCusker* ‡	25.21%	2,856									
DUP	Dale Pankhurst*	15.01%	1,701									
Sinn Féin	Ryan Murphy*	10.46%	1,185	1,326.6	1,333	1,333.04	1,333.04	1,341.44	1,341.44	1,362.2	1,835.2	
Sinn Féin	Shauneen Baker †	9.77%	1,107	1,264.44	1,278.48	1,278.76	1,279.24	1,298.12	1,302.12	1,374.24	1,680.72	
Sinn Féin	J. J. Magee*	10.01%	1,134	1,244.4	1,250.28	1,250.28	1,251.32	1,261.68	1,264.68	1,285.96	1,404.84	1,616.03
People Before Profit	Fiona Ferguson	3.94%	447	781.08	829.88	829.96	835.44	951.16	995.24	1,336.6	1,401.76	1,404.7
DUP	Gillian Simpson	5.05%	573	577.8	577.8	631.88	735.96	738.48	1,198.16	1,240.72	1,240.72	1,240.72
Sinn Féin	Mary Clarke*	7.02%	796	1,009.6	1,015.48	1,015.48	1,015.96	1,029.76	1,032.76	1,058.36		
Alliance	Jack Armstrong	3.44%	390	535.92	554.04	554.08	576.16	691.32	756.88			
PUP	Julie-Anne Corr-Johnston*	5.07%	575	582.2	584.68	595.68	677.28	689.32				
Green (NI)	Lesley Veronica	2.03%	231	296.76	320.6	320.8	331.28					
UUP	Jason Docherty	2.11%	239	242.84	242.84	244.84						
Workers' Party	Christopher Bailie	0.82%	93	141								
Electorate: 22,024 Valid: 11,327 (51.43%) Spoilt: 218 Quota: 1,619 Turnout: 11,545 (52.42%)

== 2014 Election ==
2011: 3 x Sinn Féin, 2 x DUP, 1 x SDLP

2014: 3 x Sinn Féin, 1 x DUP, 1 x SDLP, 1 x PUP

2011-2014 Change: PUP gain from DUP

Oldpark - 6 seats
Party	Candidate	FPv%	Count											
Party	Candidate	FPv%	1	2	3	4	5	6	7	8	9	10	11	12
Sinn Féin	Mary Clarke	14.80%	1,559											
Sinn Féin	J.J. Magee*	11.77%	1,240	1,250	1,260	1,263.18	1,263.18	1,275.2	1,279.3	1,831.3				
Sinn Féin	Gerry McCabe* †	11.46%	1,207	1,214	1,226	1,229.69	1,229.69	1,239.7	1,239.7	1,341	1,627.4			
DUP	Gareth McKee* †	10.81%	1,139	1,141	1,141	1,141.03	1,213.03	1,234	1,437	1,438.1	1,438.1	2,116.1		
PUP	Julie-Anne Corr	7.35%	774	788	788	788.12	899.12	907.15	1,031.2	1,031.2	1,031.2	1,163.2	1,658.2	
SDLP	Nichola Mallon*†	8.76%	923	955	970	972.73	972.73	1,110.8	1,119.8	1,176.7	1,204.6	1,211.6	1,219.6	1,247.6
Independent	Dee Fennell	8.03%	846	859	980	982.55	984.55	1,004.6	1,008.6	1,035.1	1,042.5	1,046.5	1,050.5	1,086.5
DUP	Lee Reynolds*	7.25%	764	768	768	768	802	817	888	889	889			
Sinn Féin	John Loughran	6.62%	697	711	730	763.39	763.39	782.48	784.48					
UUP	Colin Houston	3.47%	366	371	372	372.03	461.03	481.03						
Alliance	Peter McReynolds	3.04%	320	347	349	349.3	352.3							
TUV	Wayne Gilmour	3.01%	317	320	320	320								
Republican Network	Sammy Cusick	2.09%	220	231										
Workers' Party	Christopher Bailie	1.55%	163											
Electorate: 20,888 Valid: 10,535 (50.44%) Spoilt: 258 Quota: 1,506 Turnout: 10,793 (51.67%)

== 2011 Election ==
2005: 3 x Sinn Féin, 1 x DUP, 1 x SDLP, 1 x UUP

2011: 3 x Sinn Féin, 2 x DUP, 1 x SDLP

2005-2011 Change: DUP gain from UUP

Oldpark - 6 seats
Party	Candidate	FPv%	Count				
Party	Candidate	FPv%	1	2	3	4	5
DUP	Ian Crozier*	16.31%	1,770				
Sinn Féin	Conor Maskey	14.49%	1,573				
DUP	Gareth McKee	8.45%	917	1,108.04	1,115.52	1,150.84	1,570.84
Sinn Féin	Gerard McCabe	13.75%	1,492	1,492	1,510	1,514	1,568
Sinn Féin	Danny Lavery*	12.62%	1,370	1,370.48	1,382.48	1,391.48	1,459.6
SDLP	Nichola Mallon	10.91%	1,184	1,185.56	1,217.68	1,334.68	1,430.48
Sinn Féin	Mary Clarke	10.87%	1,180	1,180.12	1,189.12	1,203.12	1,255.12
UUP	Fred Rodgers	4.98%	540	551.76	556.76	613.12	
Irish Republican Socialist	Paul Little	3.49%	379	379.24	398.24	406.24	
Alliance	James McClure	2.79%	303	305.16	319.28		
Independent	Martin McAuley	1.35%	146	146.84			
Electorate: 22,408 Valid: 10,854 (48.44%) Spoilt: 405 Quota: 1,551 Turnout: 11,259 (50.25%)

== 2005 Election ==
2001: 3 x Sinn Féin, 1 x SDLP, 1 x DUP, 1 x PUP

2005: 3 x Sinn Féin, 1 x DUP, 1 x SDLP, 1 x UUP

2001-2005 Change: UUP gain from PUP

Oldpark - 6 seats
Party	Candidate	FPv%	Count						
Party	Candidate	FPv%	1	2	3	4	5	6	7
DUP	Nelson McCausland*	22.27%	2,642						
Sinn Féin	Danny Lavery*	17.64%	2,093						
Sinn Féin	Margaret McClenaghan*	15.42%	1,829						
SDLP	Alban Maginness*	11.90%	1,411	1,418.03	1,450.33	1,538.39	1,549.17	1,966.17	
UUP	Fred Cobain	7.91%	938	1,594.01	1,594.01	1,652.29	1,652.43	1,663.1	1,685.1
Sinn Féin	Caral Ni Chuilin	10.47%	1,242	1,243.48	1,468.63	1,495.01	1,585.31	1,600.85	1,657.85
PUP	Billy Hutchinson*	3.84%	455	690.69	691.45	732.59	732.66	735.22	757.22
Sinn Féin	Marie Mackessy	3.94%	467	468.85	586.08	600.22	622.2	651.74	715.74
SDLP	Andrew Harding	4.01%	476	479.33	487.69	539.44	540.07		
Green (NI)	Peter Emerson	2.10%	249	278.6	280.5				
Workers' Party	Paul Treanor	0.51%	60	60.37	62.08				
Electorate: 22,444 Valid: 11,862 (52.85%) Spoilt: 329 Quota: 1,695 Turnout: 12,191 (59.63%)

== 2001 Election ==
1997: 3 x Sinn Féin, 1 x SDLP, 1 x UUP, 1 x PUP

2001: 3 x Sinn Féin, 1 x SDLP, 1 x DUP, 1 x PUP

1997-2001 Change: DUP gain from UUP

Oldpark - 6 seats
Party	Candidate	FPv%	Count							
Party	Candidate	FPv%	1	2	3	4	5	6	7	8
Sinn Féin	Gerard Brophy	17.25%	2,755							
Sinn Féin	Margaret McClenaghan	15.44%	2,467							
DUP	Nelson McCausland*	14.97%	2,392							
SDLP	Martin Morgan*	12.09%	1,932	1,958.52	1,993.69	2,006.81	2,007.56	2,931.56		
PUP	Billy Hutchinson*	9.49%	1,516	1,516.85	1,608.02	1,608.5	1,648.65	1,670.24	1,704.24	2,471.24
Sinn Féin	Eoin O'Broin	5.99%	957	1,298.36	1,315.53	1,455.69	1,455.79	1,534.41	1,837.41	1,857.46
Sinn Féin	Kathy Stanton	8.13%	1,298	1,340.67	1,344.35	1,360.99	1,361.04	1,391.08	1,501.08	1,510.14
UUP	Fred Proctor*	6.99%	1,116	1,116.34	1,246.51	1,246.51	1,311.01	1,327.35	1,355.35	
SDLP	Joleen Connelly	6.97%	1,114	1,151.06	1,202.06	1,210.86	1,211.01			
Independent	James Bates	1.31%	209	209.17						
Alliance	Thomas McCullough	1.00%	160	161.36						
Independent	Rene Graig	0.37%	59	59.17						
Electorate: 23,866 Valid: 15,975 (66.94%) Spoilt: 687 Quota: 2,283 Turnout: 16,662 (69.81%)

== 1997 Election ==
1993: 3 x Sinn Féin, 2 x UUP, 1 x SDLP

1997: 3 x Sinn Féin, 1 x SDLP, 1 x UUP, 1 x PUP

1993-1997 Change: PUP gain from UUP

Oldpark - 6 seats
Party	Candidate	FPv%	Count									
Party	Candidate	FPv%	1	2	3	4	5	6	7	8	9	10
Sinn Féin	Mick Conlon	16.40%	2,317									
Sinn Féin	Bobby Lavery*	15.79%	2,230									
Sinn Féin	Paddy McManus*	12.55%	1,773	2,034								
SDLP	Martin Morgan*	13.74%	1,941	1,949.28	2,082.12							
PUP	Billy Hutchinson	11.20%	1,582	1,582.12	1,583.2	1,583.36	1,592.36	1,613.36	1,658.9	1,879.9	1,924.84	2,070.84
UUP	Fred Proctor*	9.32%	1,316	1,316	1,316	1,316	1,316	1,340	1,361	1,431	1,447.8	1,675.8
UUP	Fred Rodgers*	8.13%	986	986	986	986	986	1,004	1,031	1,082	1,096.83	1,397.69
DUP	David Smylie	4.66%	659	659	659	659	659	659	674	737	743.86	
SDLP	Dympna O'Hara	2.58%	365	366.92	402.83	462.51	505.35	561.57	645.27	646.27		
Ulster Democratic	Paddy Bird	3.02%	427	427	427.27	427.27	429.39	434.39	451.39			
Green (NI)	Peter Emerson	1.73%	245	246.8	273.8	275.08	286.56	333.72				
Alliance	Mark Long	1.25%	177	177.36	179.79	181.23	198.47					
Workers' Party	Steven Doran	0.77%	109	110.92	119.83	120.31						
Electorate: 25,054 Valid: 14,127 (56.39%) Spoilt: 458 Quota: 2,019 Turnout: 14,585 (58.21%)

== 1993 Election ==
1989: 2 x Sinn Féin, 2 x UUP, 1 x SDLP, 1 x Workers' Party

1993: 3 x Sinn Féin, 2 x UUP, 1 x SDLP

1989-1993 Change: Sinn Féin gain from Workers' Party

Oldpark - 6 seats
Party	Candidate	FPv%	Count								
Party	Candidate	FPv%	1	2	3	4	5	6	7	8	9
Sinn Féin	Joe Austin	15.02%	2,229								
UUP	Fred Proctor*	13.78%	2,045	2,045	2,085	2,091	2,138				
SDLP	Martin Morgan	11.88%	1,763	1,766.48	1,768.48	1,817.48	1,903.56	2,028.68	2,553.68		
Sinn Féin	Paddy McManus*	11.92%	1,769	1,810.36	1,810.36	1,822.48	1,836.72	1,840.8	1,852	1,873	1,982.68
Sinn Féin	Bobby Lavery	10.90%	1,617	1,654.12	1,654.12	1,666.2	1,685.72	1,696.04	1,707.12	1,767.12	1,919.64
UUP	Fred Rodgers	9.05%	1,343	1,343	1,394	1,400	1,417	1,542	1,548	1,555	1,724
DUP	David Smylie	8.92%	1,324	1,324.04	1,376.04	1,383.04	1,405.04	1,436.04	1,438.04	1,438.04	1,474.04
Democratic Left	Seamus Lynch*	5.61%	832	833.92	837.92	892.96	962.04	1,118.04	1,154.04	1,352.04	
SDLP	Peter Prendiville	3.96%	588	588.44	590.44	607.44	626.44	645.44			
Alliance	Beatrice Boyd	3.19%	473	473.84	483.84	501.84	584.92				
Green (NI)	Peter Emerson	2.65%	393	394.12	421.12	447.12					
Workers' Party	Margaret Smith	1.75%	259	259.32	261.32						
NI Conservatives	David Tarr	1.39%	206	206							
Electorate: 25,943 Valid: 14,841 (57.21%) Spoilt: 532 Quota: 2,121 Turnout: 15,373 (59.26%)

== 1989 Election ==
1985: 2 x Sinn Féin, 1 x UUP, 1 x SDLP, 1 x DUP, 1 x Workers' Party

1989: 2 x Sinn Féin, 2 x UUP, 1 x SDLP, 1 x Workers' Party

1985-1989 Change: UUP gain from DUP

Oldpark - 6 seats
Party	Candidate	FPv%	Count					
Party	Candidate	FPv%	1	2	3	4	5	6
SDLP	Brian Feeney*	18.38%	2,426					
Workers' Party	Seamus Lynch*	12.42%	1,639	1,912.6				
UUP	Fred Proctor*	14.02%	1,850	1,850.96	1,976.96			
UUP	William Gault	9.05%	780	782.64	886.56	951.36	1,491.96	2,050.96
Sinn Féin	Gerard McGuigan*	12.75%	1,682	1,706.96	1,723.84	1,723.84	1,723.84	1,725.84
Sinn Féin	Paddy McManus	11.73%	1,548	1,572.24	1,585.2	1,586.1	1,588.1	1,592.82
Sinn Féin	William McGarry	8.45%	1,115	1,153.16	1,187.2	1,187.2	1,188.44	1,206
Ulster Democratic	Patrick Bird	6.34%	837	837.72	883.36	896.86	1,117.84	
DUP	Stanley Mulholland	6.10%	805	805.24	839.4	851.1		
Alliance	George Jones	3.36%	443	610.52				
Ulster Democratic	William Clark	0.54%	71	71.24				
Electorate: 25,895 Valid: 13,196 (50.96%) Spoilt: 548 Quota: 1,886 Turnout: 13,744 (53.08%)

== 1985 Election ==
1985: 2 x Sinn Féin, 1 x UUP, 1 x SDLP, 1 x DUP, 1 x Workers' Party

Oldpark - 6 seats
Party	Candidate	FPv%	Count												
Party	Candidate	FPv%	1	2	3	4	5	6	7	8	9	10	11	12	13
UUP	Fred Proctor	12.54%	1,800	1,820	1,903	1,918	2,013	2,125							
Sinn Féin	Bobby Lavery	12.20%	1,752	1,765	1,766	1,786	1,793	1,794	2,373						
Sinn Féin	Gerard McGuigan	10.93%	1,570	1,576	1,576	1,585	1,591	1,591	1,726	2,030.7					
SDLP	Brian Feeney*	10.56%	1,516	1,544	1,544	1,677	1,841	1,842	1,863	1,867.4	1,867.4	2,475.4			
Workers' Party	Seamus Lynch	9.36%	1,344	1,383	1,386	1,531	1,696	1,701	1,731	1,735.4	1,735.4	1,895.5	2,226.5		
DUP	Peter Lunn	6.67%	958	974	1,054	1,056	1,082	1,523	1,523	1,523	1,537.6	1,539.6	1,542.6	1,549.6	1,824.6
UUP	David Smylie	4.94%	709	717	813	817	857	983	985	985	1,036.83	1,039.83	1,041.83	1,066.83	1,573.83
Ind. Unionist	Nelson McCausland	4.99%	717	729	815	825	872	919	920	920	926.57	930.57	934.57	951.57	
SDLP	Patrick Hunter	5.48%	787	812	814	867	913	913	922	924.2	924.2				
Sinn Féin	Paddy McManus	5.39%	774	781	781	787	787	787							
DUP	Pauline Whittley	4.76%	684	691	735	739	748								
Alliance	Arnold Carton	3.73%	535	597	618	695									
Labour Party NI	Paddy Devlin*	3.29%	472	506	518										
PUP	Patrick Bird	3.02%	433	444											
Green (NI)	Peter Emerson	2.14%	308												
Electorate: 25,774 Valid: 14,359 (55.71%) Spoilt: 389 Quota: 2,052 Turnout: 14,748 (57.22%)

== See also ==
- Belfast City Council
- Electoral wards of Belfast
- Local government in Northern Ireland
- Members of Belfast City Council
