= Patrick McCarthy (politician) =

Northern Irish politician

Patrick McCarthy MBE
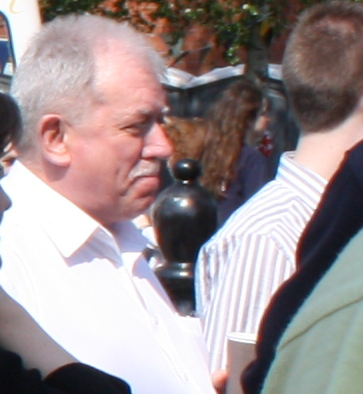

63rd Lord Mayor of Belfast
- In office 1 June 2006 – 1 June 2007
- Preceded by: Wallace Browne
- Succeeded by: Jim Rodgers

Member of Belfast City Council
- In office 7 June 2001 – 22 May 2014
- Preceded by: Alasdair McDonnell
- Succeeded by: District abolished
- Constituency: Laganbank

Personal details
- Born: Ormeau, Belfast, Northern Ireland
- Party: Social Democratic and Labour Party (former); Fianna Fáil
- Website: www.sdlp.ie

Patrick McCarthy is an Irish Nationalist former politician, in Northern Ireland, who was Lord Mayor of Belfast from 2006 to 2007. As a member of the Social Democratic and Labour Party (SDLP), he was a Belfast City Councillor for the Laganbank DEA from 2001 to 2014.

== Background ==
Born and raised in the Markets area of Belfast, McCarthy was interned without trial in 1971 on suspicion of being a member of the Official IRA, before being released in 1972. He was first elected to Belfast City Council, at the 2001 local elections, as an SDLP representative for the Laganbank District.

Following re-election in 2005, he was chosen as Lord Mayor of Belfast in 2006. McCarthy, the city's fourth nationalist mayor, was endorsed by all parties except Sinn Féin.

He was re-elected to the Council in 2011.

Following nominations from church and community groups across the sectarian divide McCarthy was appointed MBE for Political and Community Cohesion in the 2016 New Year Honours.

In 2017, McCarthy stood for election to the National Executive of Fianna Fáil, and has been a longstanding advocate for Fianna Fáil in Northern Ireland.

Civic offices
Preceded by Wallace Browne	Lord Mayor of Belfast; 2006 - 07	Succeeded by Jim Rodgers
