= Gareth McKee =

Former High Sheriff of Belfast

High Sheriff of Belfast
- In office January 2015 – 22 January 2016
- Preceded by: Lydia Patterson
- Succeeded by: Jim Rodgers

Member of Belfast City Council
- In office 1 November 2010 – 5 January 2018
- Preceded by: Nelson McCausland
- Succeeded by: Dale Pankhurst
- Constituency: Oldpark

Personal details
- Born: May 1986 (age 38); Belfast, Northern Ireland
- Political party: Democratic Unionist Party

Gareth McKee (born May 1986) is a former Democratic Unionist Party (DUP) politician who served as High Sheriff of Belfast from January 2015 to January 2016. McKee was a Belfast City Councillor from 2010 to 2018, representing the Oldpark DEA.

== Background ==
In November 2010, McKee was co-opted onto Belfast City Council to replace Nelson McCausland in the Oldpark District. He retained his seat at the 2011 City Council election.

He was re-elected to the council at the 2014 local elections.

In January 2015, McKee was appointed High Sheriff of Belfast, succeeding party colleague Lydia Patterson.

McKee announced his resignation from the council in January 2018, in order to take up other employment.
