= Rhonda Paisley =

Northern Irish author and former politician

The Honourable Rhonda Paisley

Member of Belfast City Council
- In office 15 May 1985 – 19 May 1993
- Preceded by: District created
- Succeeded by: Peter O'Reilly
- Constituency: Laganbank

Personal details
- Born: 1960 (age 65–66) Belfast, Northern Ireland
- Party: DUP

Rhonda Paisley (born 1960) is a Northern Irish author and former unionist politician. She is the second daughter of the former Democratic Unionist Party (DUP) leader and Northern Ireland's former First Minister Ian Paisley and lives with her mother, Baroness Paisley, in the family home. She attended Bob Jones University in the United States (the same institution from which her father received his honorary degree), where she was awarded a BA in Fine Art.

== Political career ==
Paisley served as a Belfast City councillor for the DUP. Sammy Wilson named her as Lady Mayoress during his tenure as first DUP Lord Mayor of Belfast in 1986/87. She served eight years as a councillor before leaving politics, later claiming that "the game plan of politics frustrated me".

== Media career ==
Paisley once guest-presented Saturday Live, a TV chat-show on the Republic of Ireland's RTÉ One channel. Her father was one of her guests.

== Controversy ==
The day after a series of Ulster Freedom Fighters incendiary bombings on shops in the Republic of Ireland during July 1991, Paisley said the bombings had been "perfectly understandable" given the "betrayal" of Northern Ireland by the British government. A serving DUP councillor at the time, Paisley was widely condemned in the Republic of Ireland and Northern Ireland.

== Legal action ==
Paisley took a case to a Fair Employment Tribunal in 1998. The case was against the Arts Council of Northern Ireland, in which she alleged religious discrimination. She was awarded £24,249. It was ruled that she had been discriminated against on account of her religious beliefs and political opinions when applying for the post of an arts co-operation officer in 1995. She is a long-standing member of the Free Presbyterian Church of Ulster, which her father established.

In March 2005 Paisley took a legal action alleging gender discrimination against the DUP, which named her father, Ian Paisley, after she failed in her application for a post in the policy and communications unit in the DUP. The case was settled out of court, and Paisley received an apology from the party.
