= Kathy Stanton =

Irish politician

Member of the Northern Ireland Assembly for Belfast North
- In office 26 November 2003 – 7 March 2007
- Preceded by: Billy Hutchinson
- Succeeded by: Carál Ní Chuilín

Member of Belfast City Council
- In office 2000 – 7 June 2001
- Constituency: Oldpark

Personal details
- Born: Belfast, Northern Ireland
- Party: Sinn Féin

Kathy Stanton is a former Sinn Féin politician who was a Member of the Legislative Assembly (MLA) for North Belfast from 2003 until 2007

== Background ==
Stanton was co-opted to Belfast City Council in 2000, for the Oldpark District, before losing her seat in the 2001 local government elections. She was then elected to the Northern Ireland Assembly, representing North Belfast, in the 2003 election. As a Sinn Féin representative, Stanton served as a party official in North Belfast, as well as equality spokesperson. In 2006, she announced that she would not be contesting the next Assembly election, but denied reports that this was owing to Sinn Féin endorsing the Police Service of Northern Ireland.

=== Personal life ===
She lives in the New Lodge area with her five children.

Northern Ireland Assembly
Preceded by Billy Hutchinson	MLA for Belfast North; 2003–2007	Succeeded by Carál Ní Chuilín
