= Steve McBride (politician) =

Northern Irish barrister and politician

High Sheriff of Belfast
- In office January 1996 – January 1997
- Preceded by: Joe Coggle
- Succeeded by: Nelson McCausland

Member of Belfast City Council
- In office 17 May 1989 – 7 June 2001
- Preceded by: William McDowell
- Succeeded by: Peter O'Reilly
- Constituency: Laganbank

Northern Ireland Forum Member for South Belfast
- In office 30 May 1996 – 25 April 1998
- Preceded by: Forum established
- Succeeded by: Forum dissolved

Personal details
- Born: Belfast, Northern Ireland
- Political party: Alliance

Steve McBride is a Northern Irish barrister and former Alliance Party politician.

== Career ==
McBride is active in the Alliance Party of Northern Ireland (APNI). He became the Chairman of APNI in the 1990s, and in 1996 was elected to the Northern Ireland Forum, representing Belfast South. At the 1997 general election, McBride took 12.9% of the vote and fourth place in the Westminster seat of Belfast South. At the 1998 Northern Ireland Assembly election he narrowly missed out on a seat, despite coming third on first preference votes in the six seat constituency.

Northern Ireland Forum
New forum	Member for South Belfast; 1996–1998	Forum dissolved
Civic offices
Preceded by Joe Coggle	High Sheriff of Belfast; 1996–1997	Succeeded by Nelson McCausland
