= Jim Clarke (Northern Ireland politician) =

Politician from Belfast

High Sheriff of Belfast
- In office 1998–1999
- Preceded by: Nelson McCausland
- Succeeded by: Robin Newton

Member of Belfast City Council
- In office 17 May 1989 – 5 May 2005
- Preceded by: William Blair
- Succeeded by: Christopher Stalford
- Constituency: Laganbank

Member of the Northern Ireland Forum for Belfast South
- In office 30 May 1996 – 25 April 1998

Personal details
- Born: Belfast, Northern Ireland
- Party: Ulster Unionist Party
- Spouse: Margaret Clarke

James Clarke, known as Jim Clarke, is a former Ulster Unionist Party (UUP) politician. Clarke was High Sheriff of Belfast between 1998 and 1999, and was a Belfast City councillor for the Laganbank DEA from 1989 to 2005.

== Political career ==
Clarke became active in the Ulster Unionist Party, and was elected for the Laganbank area on Belfast City Council at the 1989 Northern Ireland local elections. He held his seat in 1993, and was then also elected to the Northern Ireland Forum, representing Belfast South. However, he failed to hold this seat at the 1998 Northern Ireland Assembly election.

In 1998, Clarke served as High Sheriff of Belfast, and he held his council seat in both 1997 and 2001 before standing down in 2005. At that time, he was the chair of Belfast's Environmental Services Committee.

In 2000, it was announced that Clarke owed nine years' worth of back subscription to the UUP's National Association of Councillors. Clarke stated that he did not see any point in paying.

Northern Ireland Forum
New forum	Member for South Belfast; 1996–1998	Forum dissolved
Civic offices
Preceded by Nelson McCausland	High Sheriff of Belfast; 1998–1999	Succeeded by Robin Newton
