= Alex Maskey =

Northern Irish politician (born 1952)

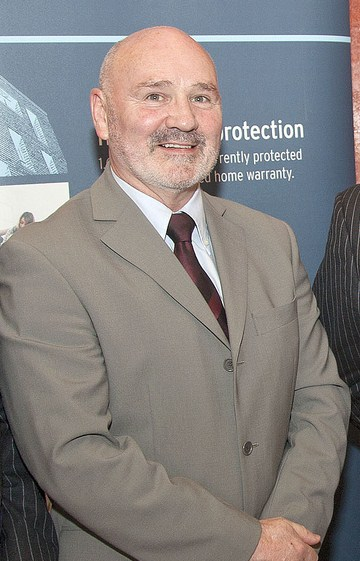
- Maskey in 2012

Speaker of the Northern Ireland Assembly
- In office 11 January 2020 – 3 February 2024
- Deputy: Christopher Stalford; Roy Beggs Jr; Patsy McGlone
- Preceded by: Robin Newton
- Succeeded by: Edwin Poots

Member of the Northern Ireland Assembly for Belfast West
- In office 3 November 2014 – 28 March 2022
- Preceded by: Sue Ramsey
- Succeeded by: Daniel Baker
- In office 25 June 1998 – 28 April 2003
- Preceded by: New Creation
- Succeeded by: Fra McCann

Member of the Northern Ireland Assembly for Belfast South
- In office 26 November 2003 – 22 October 2014
- Preceded by: Monica McWilliams
- Succeeded by: Máirtín Ó Muilleoir

59th Lord Mayor of Belfast
- In office 1 June 2002 – 1 June 2003
- Preceded by: Jim Rodgers
- Succeeded by: Martin Morgan

Member of Belfast City Council
- In office 7 June 2001 – 13 October 2010
- Preceded by: Sean Hayes
- Succeeded by: Deirdre Hargey
- Constituency: Laganbank
- In office 15 May 1985 – 7 June 2001
- Preceded by: District created
- Succeeded by: Paul Maskey
- Constituency: Upper Falls
- In office June 1983 – 15 May 1985
- Preceded by: Gerry Kelly
- Succeeded by: District abolished
- Constituency: Belfast Area D

Member of the Northern Ireland Forum for Belfast West
- In office 30 May 1996 – 25 April 1998

Personal details
- Born: 8 January 1952 (age 74) Belfast, Northern Ireland
- Party: None (Speaker)
- Other political affiliations: Sinn Féin (before 2020)
- Spouse: Liz McKee (m. 1981)
- Relations: Paul Maskey (brother)
- Children: 2
- Website: Sinn Féin profile (archived 2007)

Alex Maskey (born 8 January 1952) is an Irish former politician who served as Speaker of the Northern Ireland Assembly from 2020 to 2024 and was the first member of Sinn Féin to serve as Lord Mayor of Belfast from 2002 to 2003. He was Sinn Féin's longest sitting councillor, representing the Laganbank electoral area of Belfast. He was also an MLA for Belfast West for two periods, and also for Belfast South. He reportedly retired "from frontline politics" in early 2024.

== Early life ==
Maskey was educated at St Malachy's College and at the Belfast Institute for Further and Higher Education and then worked in Belfast docks as a labourer and barman. He was a successful amateur boxer, having only lost 4 out of 75 fights.

After the Troubles began in the late 1960s he became involved with the Provisional Irish Republican Army, and was interned twice in the 1970s.

== Political career ==
Maskey stood unsuccessfully in West Belfast in the 1982 Assembly Election. In June 1983, Maskey won a by-election and became the first member of Sinn Féin to be elected to Belfast City Council since the 1920s. He was greeted with boos and jeers when he entered the chamber for his first council meeting, and unionist councillors started stamping their feet and screaming when he attempted to deliver his maiden speech in Irish.

Maskey emerged as a key ally of Sinn Féin President Gerry Adams' approach to the strategy. In 1987 he survived being shot at close range by loyalist paramilitaries. He was targeted again by loyalists in 1988, and also a gun attack at his home in 1993 when one of his friends, Alan Lundy, was killed. In 1996 Maskey was elected to the Northern Ireland Peace Forum for the Belfast West constituency but did not attend the Forum in accordance with Sinn Féin's policy of abstentionism. Two years later he was elected to the Northern Ireland Assembly, which on this occasion Sinn Féin did not boycott.

Maskey's growing political profile led him to contest the Belfast South constituency in the 2001 general election as part of Sinn Féin's strategy of building up their vote in one of their weaker constituencies.

In the local elections held on the same day he switched to the Laganbank area of South Belfast and won a seat there.

In 2002 Maskey became the first ever republican to serve as Lord Mayor of Belfast. His first duty in office was to open the annual Presbyterian General Assembly despite being a non-Presbyterian.

Maskey garnered general praise when as part of his duties as Lord Mayor in July 2002 he laid a wreath in memorial of British soldiers who died in the First World War. However he declined to attend the main memorial ceremony, stating that it was "the military commemoration of the Battle of the Somme". In his office he flew the UK's Union Jack and the Irish tricolour side by side.

In the 2003 Assembly election Maskey stood in South Belfast again and won Sinn Féin's first seat there with a boost in the vote share. He contested the same-named House of Commons seat in the 2005 general election with the vote share down on the Assembly elections, losing to the Social Democratic and Labour Party candidate, Alasdair McDonnell.

In March 2006, Maskey participated in the negotiations resulting in the Basque nationalist organisation ETA truce announced on 22 March. On 23 April 2007, he was announced as one of three Sinn Féin members who would sit on the re-vamped Northern Ireland Policing Board.

Maskey resigned from Belfast City Council in October 2010, as part of Sinn Féin's policy of abolishing double jobbing.

== Speakership ==
With the restoration of the Northern Ireland Assembly at Stormont, Maskey was elected Speaker on 11 January 2020.

On 23 September 2021, he announced that he would not seek re-election at the 2022 Assembly election. In a letter to Sinn Féin parties, he said it had been an "honour" to represent communities, adding "There is a lot of work left to do before the next assembly election and that is where my focus will be until then." In response, party leader and Deputy First Minister Michelle O'Neill said Maskey had been "a ferocious champion of the rights of communities within the Assembly, in Belfast City Council and on the ground". She added that he "was imprisoned without trial, faced down sustained threats and attacks by British state forces and their loyalist surrogates and was almost killed in an attack at his home which left him with permanent injuries."

He continued to serve as speaker despite not being an MLA following the 2022 election because the DUP refused to participate in the election of a new speaker. After leaving the post of speaker, in early 2024, he reportedly "retire[d] from frontline politics".

== Personal life ==
Maskey and his wife, Liz McKee have been married since 1981. They have two sons.

On 25 December 2005, Maskey suffered a heart attack while with his family. Several weeks later he appeared on BBC Radio Ulster to talk about his health.

Maskey is teetotal.

Civic offices
Preceded by Jim Rodgers	Lord Mayor of Belfast; 2002–03	Succeeded by Martin Morgan
Northern Ireland Forum
New forum	Member for West Belfast; 1996–1998	Forum dissolved
Northern Ireland Assembly
New assembly	MLA for Belfast West; 1998–2003	Succeeded by Fra McCann
Preceded by Monica McWilliams	MLA for Belfast South; 2003–2014	Succeeded by Máirtín Ó Muilleoir
Preceded by Sue Ramsey	MLA for Belfast West; 2014–2022	Succeeded by Daniel Baker
Preceded by Robin Newton	Speaker of the Northern Ireland Assembly; 2020–2024	Succeeded by Edwin Poots
