= Nelson McCausland =

Northern Irish columnist and politician

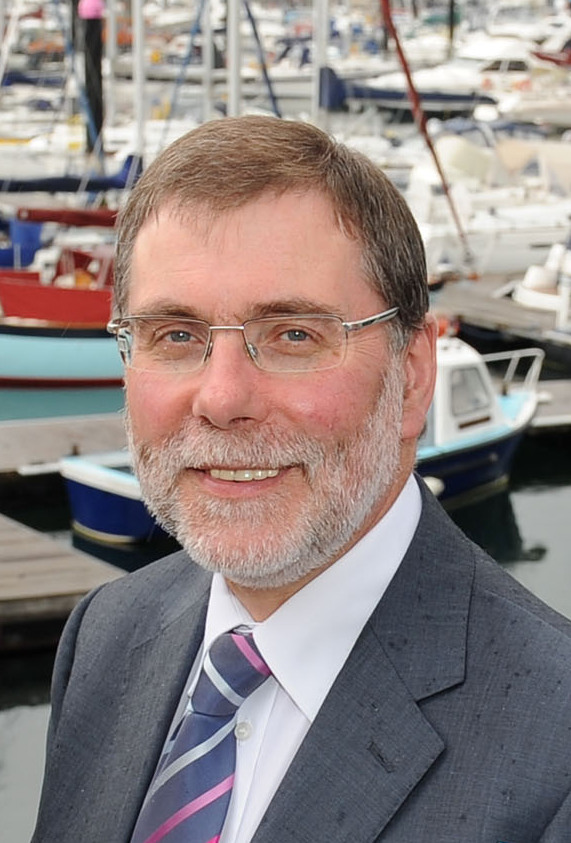

Minister for Social Development
- In office 16 May 2011 – 23 September 2014
- Preceded by: Alex Attwood
- Succeeded by: Mervyn Storey

Member of the Legislative Assembly for Belfast North
- In office 26 November 2003 – 25 January 2017
- Preceded by: Fraser Agnew
- Succeeded by: Seat abolished

High Sheriff of Belfast
- In office 1997–1998
- Preceded by: Steve McBride
- Succeeded by: Jim Clarke

Member of Belfast City Council
- In office 7 June 2001 – 1 November 2010
- Preceded by: Fred Proctor
- Succeeded by: Gareth McKee
- Constituency: Oldpark
- In office 17 May 1989 – 7 June 2001
- Preceded by: Alfred Redpath
- Succeeded by: Ian Crozier
- Constituency: Castle

Personal details
- Born: 15 August 1951 (age 75) Belfast, Northern Ireland
- Party: Democratic Unionist Party (2001 – present); Ulster Unionist Party (1993 – 2001)
- Other political affiliations: Independent Unionist (1984 – 1993); United Ulster Unionist (1982)
- Education: Queen's University Belfast; Worcester College, Oxford
- Profession: Teacher
- Website: DUP website

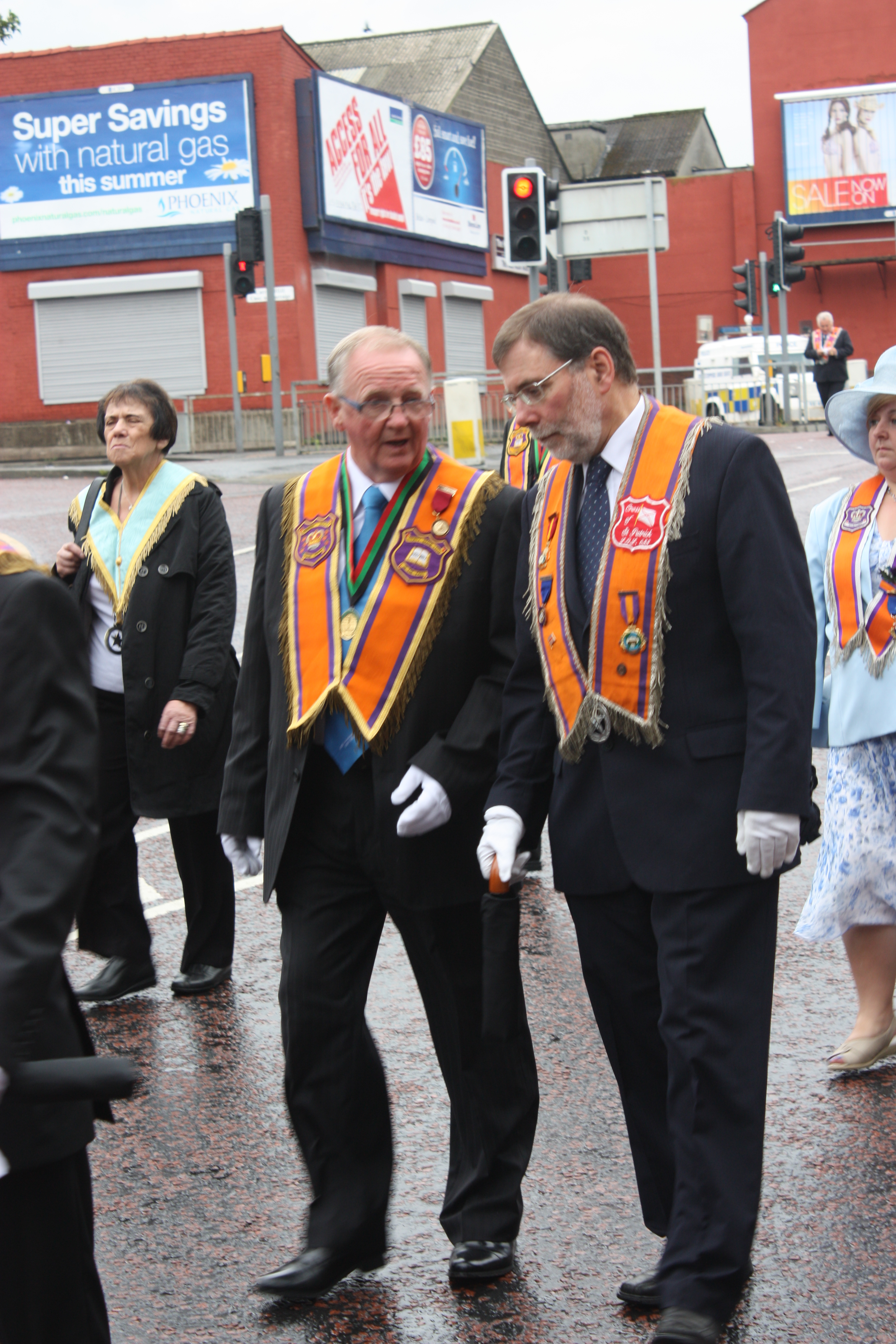
Nelson McCausland (right), Orange Parade, Belfast, 12 July 2011

Nelson McCausland (born 15 August 1951) is a Northern Irish columnist and former Democratic Unionist Party (DUP) politician who was Minister of Culture, Arts and Leisure (2009–2011) and subsequently Minister for Social Development (2011–2014) in the Northern Ireland Executive.

McCausland was a Member of the Northern Ireland Assembly (MLA) for North Belfast from 2003, until 2017.

== Education ==
He was born in Belfast, Northern Ireland, and was educated at Carr's Glen Primary School, Belfast Royal Academy, Worcester College, Oxford and Queen's University.

== Career ==
McCausland was a science teacher in Ballygomartin Boys Secondary School (later Cairnmartin Secondary School) from 1973 to 1981, and then became the Northern Ireland Secretary of the Lord's Day Observance Society, an evangelical Christian organisation. McCausland made his political debut in the 1982 Assembly elections, standing in North Belfast for the United Ulster Unionist Party (UUUP), when he was eliminated early on in the count. The UUUP fared badly in that election and afterwards it disbanded.

He ran as an Independent Unionist in a Belfast City Council by-election for Belfast Area H in February 1984, but polled only 9% of the vote. He stood again the following year for the Oldpark area in the local government elections, but managed only 5% of the vote.

He finally succeeded in gaining election for the Castle area in 1989, taking the seat of Alfie Redpath, the by-election victor of five years before. Around this time McCausland briefly served as a member of the Ulster Independence Committee. He was re-elected in 1993 as an Independent Unionist but announced the week after the election that he would join the Ulster Unionist Party and became the High Sheriff of Belfast in 1997. He was a candidate for the UUP in the 1996 Northern Ireland Forum elections, but was placed third on the UUP list, effectively giving him no chance of election. He attempted to dislodge Cecil Walker as North Belfast MP during the 1990s.

Disenchanted with the UUP under David Trimble, whom he had supported for the leadership, he defected to the Democratic Unionist Party in 2001 and was re-elected as a local councillor for the Oldpark area in 2001 and 2005. McCausland represented the Council on the board of the Ulster Museum and the Ulster Folk and Transport Museum, and he was for some years a member of the Community Relations Council. He stepped down as a councillor in November 2010.

He was a member of the Northern Ireland Assembly from 2003 to 2017. He was suspended twice from the Assembly for unparliamentary language in respect of allegations of Provisional IRA membership made against the Sinn Féin president Gerry Adams.

McCausland was a member of the Bill of Rights Forum, which was set up by the Northern Ireland Office, after the St Andrews Agreement, to advise on a Bill of Rights for Northern Ireland. The membership was drawn from the main political parties and the community and voluntary sector and it reported on 31 March 2008 but it achieved a minimal level of consensus.

Regarding coverage of a loyalist band filmed playing tunes outside a Catholic church, McCausland said, "If someone was intending to be provocative or inflammatory which is the suggestion that is being made, it wasn't really very provocative...It was just an empty building. There was no-one there to be provoked."

McCausland writes a weekly column in the Belfast Telegraph; he also writes a personal blog entitled Nelson's View.

== Controversy ==
In June 2009, he was appointed Minister of Culture, Arts and Leisure, and it was in his capacity as Minister that in May 2010, after lobbying by the Caleb Foundation pressure group, he wrote to the Ulster Museum requesting that it display a range of Creationist and other anti-Evolution material, claiming that it was the Museum's job to "reflect the views of all the people in Northern Ireland" rather than to reflect the understanding of modern science. In response to McCausland's letter, Richard Dawkins, an evolutionary biologist and noted atheist, said "If the museum was to go down that road then perhaps they should bring in the stork theory of where babies come from. Or perhaps the museum should introduce the flat earth theory". On 16 May 2011, after the Assembly election, he was appointed as Minister for Social Development.

=== Red Sky controversy ===
A Spotlight investigation into Red Sky, a Belfast-based company, showed financial irregularities which was just awarded a new maintenance contract by the Northern Ireland Housing Executive (NIHE). The company's £8 million contract was cancelled after it was found to be overcharging the NIHE. McCausland, along with other members of the DUP, intervened and he made a formal request as Minister for Social Development to the NIHE board to extend Red Sky's contract. Red Sky, which was a "Protestant" firm, went into voluntary administration after a report concluded there were fraud concerns at the company. McCausland's then-special adviser, Stephen Brimstone, was alleged to have called a DUP councillor, Jenny Palmer, to "pressure her" into changing her vote at the NIHE meeting to overturn the board's decision to cancel Red Sky's contract.

As a result, the DUP disciplined Palmer for speaking out against the party. A subsequent inquiry into the claims by the Social Development Committee found that McCausland "acted inappropriately" by requesting an extension of the company's contract. The inquiry's report was "noted" by the Northern Ireland Assembly.

=== Becket Cook article ===
In January 2021, McCausland faced calls to resign from the Education Authority after sharing an article on Facebook about Becket Cook, an American who lived as a gay man until he became a born-again Christian. McCausland wrote, "A powerful testimony of a life changed by God and some important insights into the whole 'gay movement' from someone who has been there".

== Affiliations ==
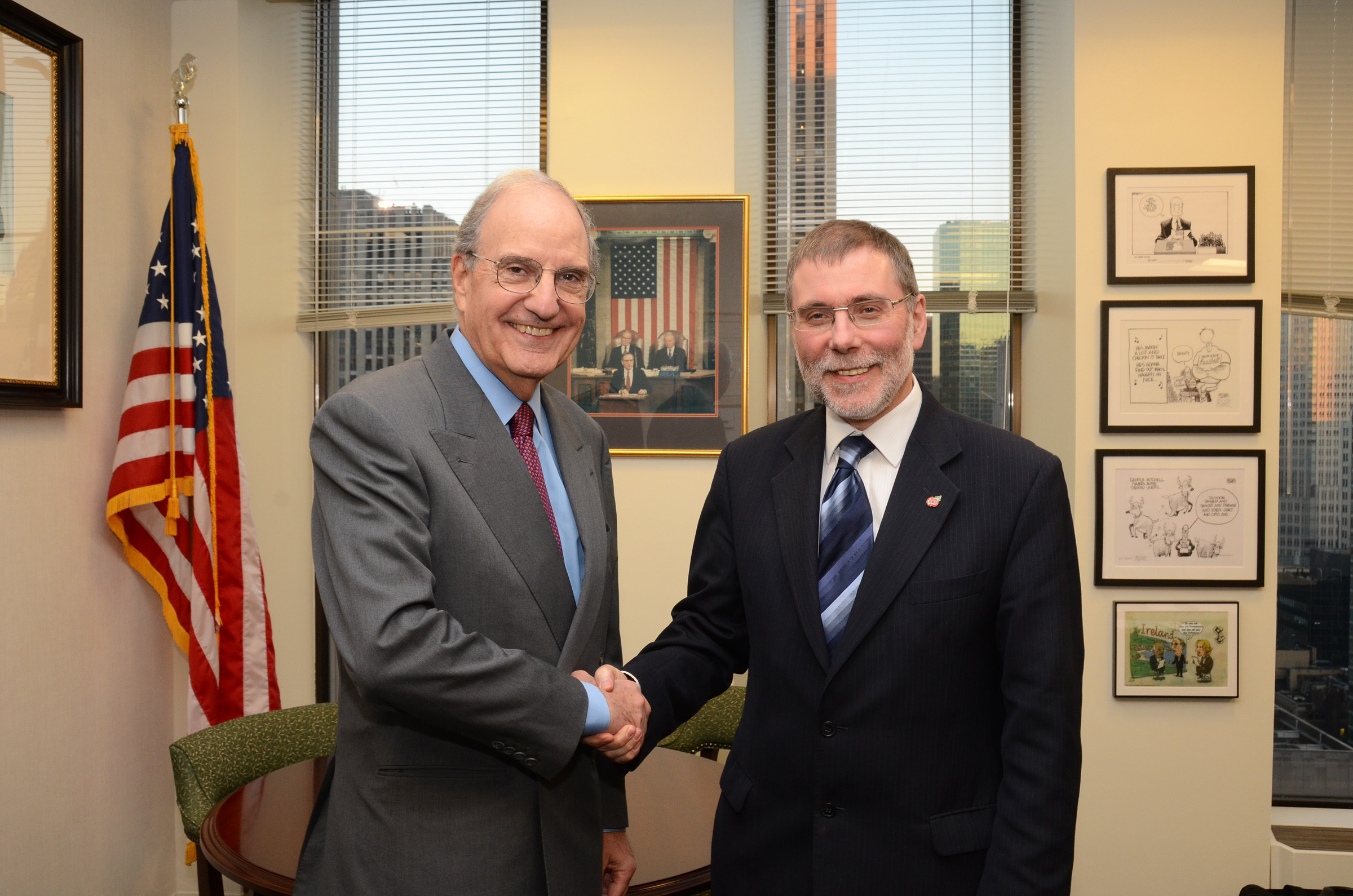
Nelson with US-Senator George J. Mitchell

McCausland was chairman of the Ulster-Scots Heritage Council (USHC) when it was formed in 1995 and was then the director of the USHC from 1997 until his election to the Assembly in 2003. At that time he was succeeded by his party and Council colleague William Humphrey. McCausland served as DUP spokesman and Minister for Culture, Arts and Leisure.

He is a member of Cross of Saint Patrick LOL 688 and Royal Black Knights of Patrick Royal Black Preceptory 146 and was for some years convenor of the Education Committee of the Grand Orange Lodge of Ireland under the Loyal Orange Institution. McCausland served as the Northern Ireland Secretary of the Lord's Day Observance Society from 1981 to 1992. He has been described as a "Protestant fundamentalist".

McCausland adheres to the pseudoarchaeological belief that the people of the British Isles are descended from the lost tribes of Israel, and has addressed events organised by the British-Israel-World Federation.

== Work ==
- Patrick, Apostle of Ulster: A Protestant View of Patrick. Grand Orange Lodge of Ireland; ISBN 978-0-9501444-5-0

Civic offices
Preceded by Steve McBride	High Sheriff of Belfast; 1997–1998	Succeeded by Jim Clarke
Political offices
Preceded by Gregory Campbell	Minister of Culture, Arts and Leisure; 2009–2011	Succeeded by Carál Ní Chuilín
Preceded by Alex Attwood	Minister for Social Development; 2011–2014	Succeeded by Mervyn Storey
Northern Ireland Assembly
Preceded by Fraser Agnew	MLA for Belfast North; 2003–2017	Seat abolished
