= Robin Newton =

British politician (born 1945)

Robin Newton MBE
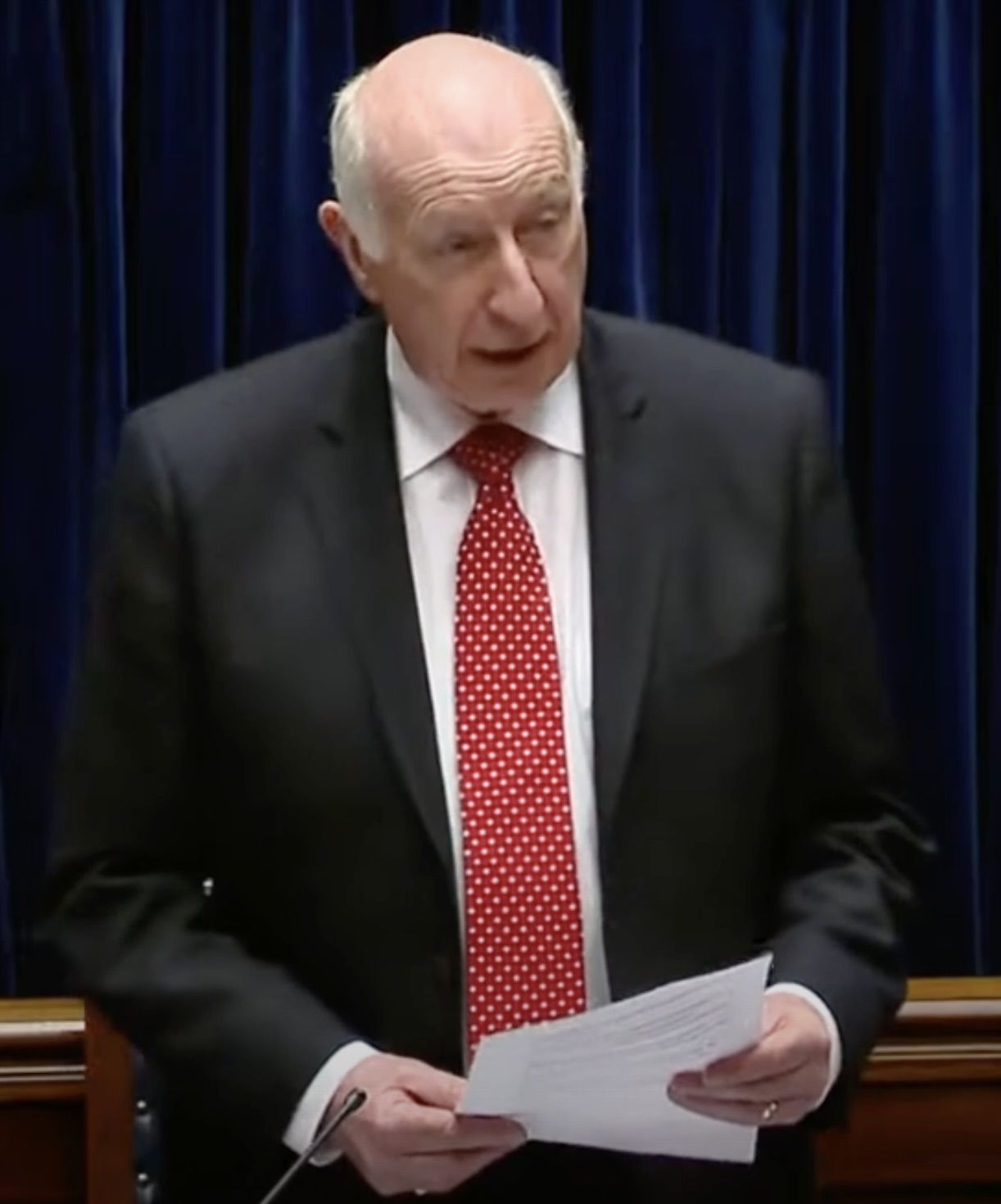
- Newton in 2017

Speaker of the Northern Ireland Assembly
- In office 12 May 2016 – 11 January 2020
- Deputy: Caitríona Ruane; Patsy McGlone; Danny Kennedy
- Preceded by: Mitchel McLaughlin
- Succeeded by: Alex Maskey

Principal Deputy Speaker of the Northern Ireland Assembly
- In office 20 January 2015 – 12 May 2016
- Preceded by: Mitchel McLaughlin
- Succeeded by: Caitríona Ruane

Junior Minister at the Office of the First Minister and deputy First Minister
- In office 1 July 2009 – 16 May 2011 Serving with Gerry Kelly
- Preceded by: Jeffrey Donaldson
- Succeeded by: Jonathan Bell

Member of the Legislative Assembly for Belfast East
- In office 26 November 2003 – 28 March 2022
- Preceded by: Sammy Wilson
- Succeeded by: David Brooks

High Sheriff of Belfast
- In office January 1999 – January 2000
- Preceded by: Jim Clarke
- Succeeded by: Tom Campbell

Member of Belfast City Council
- In office 15 May 1985 – 22 May 2014
- Preceded by: New district
- Succeeded by: District abolished
- Constituency: Victoria

Personal details
- Born: 21 December 1945 (age 80) Belfast, Northern Ireland
- Party: Democratic Unionist Party
- Spouse: Carole Newton
- Children: 2
- Website: Robin Newton MLA

Robert "Robin" Gray Newton MBE (born 21 December 1945) is a Unionist politician from Northern Ireland representing the Democratic Unionist Party (DUP). He was a Member of the Northern Ireland Assembly (MLA) for East Belfast from 2003 to 2022, and was a junior minister in the Office of the First Minister and deputy First Minister from 2009 to 2011.

Newton is a chief executive of a management consultancy company and a member of the East Belfast Partnership Board, which promotes economic development in East Belfast. He served as Speaker of the Northern Ireland Assembly from 12 May 2016 until 11 January 2020. He and his wife Carole have two children.

He was appointed a Member of the Order of the British Empire (MBE) in the 2008 Birthday Honours "for services to Local Government and to the community in Northern Ireland."

== Political career ==
Newton was first elected to Belfast City Council in 1985. Newton is chairman of the Waterfront Hall board. He was an unsuccessful candidate in East Belfast in the 1996 Northern Ireland Forum election. He was elected as a DUP member of the Northern Ireland Assembly for East Belfast in 2003.

After the 1998 Northern Ireland Assembly election, he was the deputy chair of the Development Committee. He takes particular interest in housing matters, the elderly, health services and employment opportunities. Newton is the DUP party spokesperson for Enterprise, Trade and Investment. On 12 May 2016 he was elected Speaker of the Northern Ireland Assembly.

In 2022, Newton was deselected as a DUP candidate and as a result did not contest the 2022 Assembly election.

=== Executive ===
First Minister and DUP leader Peter Robinson announced on 22 June 2009 that Robin Newton would replace Jeffrey Donaldson as junior minister in the Office of the First Minister and deputy First Minister at the beginning of the new assembly term in September 2009. This reshuffle took place due to Robinson's plans to phase out "double jobbing" amongst elected representatives. Newton was sworn in as junior minister by the speaker, William Hay, on 1 July 2009, and served until 16 May 2011. From 2011 until 2012, he was a Political Member of the Northern Ireland Policing Board.

Civic offices
Preceded by Jim Clarke	High Sheriff of Belfast; 1999–2000	Succeeded by Tom Campbell
Political offices
Preceded by Jeffrey Donaldson	Junior Minister; 2009–2011	Succeeded by Jonathan Bell
Northern Ireland Assembly
Preceded by Sammy Wilson	MLA for Belfast East; 2003–2022	Incumbent
Preceded by Mitchel McLaughlin	Speaker of the Northern Ireland Assembly; 2016–2020	Succeeded by Alex Maskey
