= 1993 Belfast City Council election =

Northern Ireland local election

← 1989	19 May 1993	1997 →

All 51 seats to Belfast City Council 26 seats needed for a majority
	First party	Second party	Third party
Party	UUP	Sinn Féin	DUP
Seats won	15	10	9
Seat change	▲1	▲2	▲1
	Fourth party	Fifth party	Sixth party
Party	SDLP	Alliance	Ind. Unionist
Seats won	9	5	2
Seat change	▲1	▼1	▼3
	Seventh party	Eighth party
Party	PUP	Workers' Party
Seats won	1	0
Seat change	0	▼1
- Party with the most votes by district.
Lord Mayor before election
Herbert Ditty
UUP
Lord Mayor
Reg Empey
UUP

Elections to Belfast City Council were held on 19 May 1993 on the same day as the other Northern Irish local government elections. The election used nine district electoral areas to elect a total of 51 councillors, most representing the more heavily populated north and west.

The UUP remained the largest party, and Reg Empey became the Lord Mayor.

== Election results ==
Belfast local election result 1993
Party	Seats	Gains	Losses	Net gain/loss	Seats %	Votes %	Votes	+/−
UUP	15	2	0	▲2	29.4	22.0	23,811	▲0.3
Sinn Féin	10	2	0	▲2	19.6	22.7	24,648	▲4.0
DUP	9	2	1	▲1	17.6	17.1	18,567	▲2.3
SDLP	9	2	1	▲1	17.6	15.9	17,283	▼0.2
Alliance	5	0	1	▼1	9.8	11.2	12,102	▲0.3
Ind. Unionist	2	0	3	▼3	3.9	2.4	2,553	▼3.7
PUP	1	0	0	0	2.0	1.5	1,609	▼1.0
Workers' Party	0	0	1	▼1	0.0	1.8	1,966	▼3.5
NI Conservatives	0	0	0	0	0.0	2.3	2,465	New
Democratic Left	0	0	0	0	0.0	1.0	1,125	New
Green (NI)	0	0	0	0	0.0	1.2	1,257	New
Independent Labour	0	0	0	0	0.0	0.6	670	▲0.6
Ind. Nationalist	0	0	0	0	0.0	0.3	378	▲0.3

Note: "Votes" are the first preference votes.

== Districts summary ==
Results of the Belfast City Council election, 1993 by district
Ward	%	Cllrs	%	Cllrs	%	Cllrs	%	Cllrs	%	Cllrs	%	Cllrs	%	Cllrs	Total Cllrs
Ward	UUP		Sinn Féin		DUP		SDLP		Alliance		PUP		Others		Total Cllrs
Balmoral	30.6	2	0.0	0	23.4	2	19.1	1	18.6	1	0.0	0	8.3	0	6
Castle	28.2	2	4.8	0	20.7	1	22.4	2	9.8	0	0.0	0	14.1	1	6
Court	38.9	2	0.0	0	25.0	1	0.0	0	3.9	0	22.7	1	9.5	1	5
Laganbank	27.7	2	9.4	0	10.5	0	26.9	2	16.5	1	0.0	0	9.0	0	5
Lower Falls	0.0	0	71.2	4	0.0	0	21.0	1	0.8	0	0.0	0	6.9	0	5
Oldpark	22.8	2	37.8	3	8.9	0	15.8	1	3.3	0	0.0	0	11.4	1	6
Pottinger	27.1	2	6.5	0	41.8	3	0.0	0	13.0	1	0.0	0	11.6	0	6
Upper Falls	0.0	0	57.1	3	1.3	0	35.4	2	1.1	0	0.0	0	5.1	0	5
Victoria	30.5	3	0.0	0	28.7	2	0.0	0	34.5	2	0.0	0	6.3	0	7
Total	22.0	15	22.7	10	17.1	9	15.9	9	11.2	5	1.5	1	9.6	2	51

== District results ==
=== Balmoral ===
1989: 2 x UUP, 1 x DUP, 1 x SDLP, 1 x Alliance
1993: 2 x UUP, 2 x DUP, 1 x SDLP, 1 x Alliance
1989-1993 Change: DUP gain due to the addition of one seat

Balmoral - 6 seats
Party	Candidate	FPv%	Count											
Party	Candidate	FPv%	1	2	3	4	5	6	7	8	9	10	11	12
SDLP	Dorita Field*	19.12%	2,262											
DUP	John Parkes*	17.55%	2,076											
Alliance	Philip McGarry	10.76%	1,273	1,545.43	1,547.41	1,550.68	1,572.94	1,596.07	1,633.33	1,695.77				
UUP	Mary Crooks*	13.66%	1,616	1,617.89	1,638.59	1,639.22	1,640.22	1,644.4	1,644.58	1,649.85	1,790.85			
UUP	Jim Kirkpatrick*	11.80%	1,396	1,397.35	1,411.57	1,411.75	1,412.75	1,413.75	1,417.75	1,425.2	1,553.36	1,906.36		
DUP	Harry Smith	5.89%	697	697.81	993.37	995.55	995.73	996.73	1,002.18	1,011.54	1,070.86	1,242.48	1,363.48	1,396.48
Alliance	Mark Long*	7.80%	923	1,065.02	1,066.46	1,068.46	1,078.69	1,101.01	1,149.61	1,222.54	1,298.24	1,310.14	1,325.14	1,357.14
UUP	Bob Stoker	5.17%	611	611	627.74	628.74	630.1	631.1	635.1	637.37	707.88			
NI Conservatives	Esmond Birnie	2.36%	279	279.54	280.26	304.26	304.26	307.98	311.25	318.79				
NI Conservatives	William Dickson	2.23%	264	264.81	276.33	276.51	276.51	279.51	292.78	296.05				
Green (NI)	Roderick McAlister	1.05%	124	168.28	168.82	172.82	189.38	213.13	273.59					
Independent Labour	Niall Cusack	0.96%	113	153.5	154.04	166.04	178.25	207.45						
Democratic Left	Jean Craig	0.82%	97	117.52	118.06	118.06	133.81							
Workers' Party	Shaun McKeown	0.40%	48	85.53	86.25	86.25								
NI Conservatives	Hubert Mullan	0.42%	50	50.54	51.98									
Electorate: 23,497 Valid: 11,829 (50.34%) Spoilt: 331 Quota: 1,690 Turnout: 12,160 (51.75%)

=== Castle ===
1989: 2 x Independent Unionist, 1 x UUP, 1 SDLP, 1 x DUP, 1 x Alliance
1993: 2 x UUP, 2 SDLP, 1 x DUP, 1 x Independent Unionist
1989-1993 Change: UUP and SDLP gain from Independent Unionist and Alliance

Castle - 6 seats
Party	Candidate	FPv%	Count								
Party	Candidate	FPv%	1	2	3	4	5	6	7	8	9
DUP	Nigel Dodds*	20.61%	2,470								
UUP	David Browne	15.27%	1,830								
UUP	John Carson*	12.98%	1,556	1,862.24							
Ind. Unionist	Nelson McCausland*	8.93%	1,070	1,475.76	1,604.58	1,608.9	1,696.61	1,801.61			
SDLP	Alban Maginness*	13.26%	1,589	1,589.96	1,589.96	1,617.96	1,618.31	1,626.38	2,010.38		
SDLP	Jonathan Stevenson	9.09%	1,090	1,090	1,090	1,100	1,100.21	1,101.21	1,296.2	1,565.9	1,566.9
Alliance	Tom Campbell*	9.78%	1,172	1,185.44	1,194.75	1,225.75	1,234.15	1,311.09	1,465.04	1,490.15	1,550.15
Sinn Féin	Gerard McGuigan	4.80%	575	575.64	575.64	578.64	578.92	579.31			
Green (NI)	Alan Warren	2.09%	251	255.8	257.51	303.83	306.7	337.1			
NI Conservatives	Margaret Redpath	2.05%	246	269.36	274.49	274.49	281.63				
Workers' Party	Paul Treanor	1.13%	136	137.28	137.66						
Electorate: 22,839 Valid: 11,985 (52.48%) Spoilt: 346 Quota: 1,713 Turnout: 12,331 (53.99%)

=== Court ===
1989: 2 x UUP, 1 x DUP, 1 x PUP, 1 x Protestant Unionist, 1 x Independent Unionist
1993: 2 x UUP, 1 x DUP, 1 x PUP, 1 x Independent Unionist
1989-1993 Change: Protestant Unionist loss due to the reduction of one seat

Court - 5 seats
Party	Candidate	FPv%	Count						
Party	Candidate	FPv%	1	2	3	4	5	6	7
DUP	Eric Smyth*	24.98%	2,385						
UUP	Fred Cobain*	17.53%	1,674						
PUP	Hugh Smyth*	16.85%	1,609						
UUP	Chris McGimpsey	15.42%	1,472	1,672.2					
Ind. Unionist	Joseph Coggle*	8.29%	792	1,010.4	1,101.4	1,133.55	1,158.34	1,164.77	1,569.37
UUP	Herbert Ditty*	5.99%	572	695.9	792.7	824.4	859.25	861.65	1,068.26
PUP	Elizabeth Seawright*	5.84%	558	772.2	819.65	832.3	850.32	855.74	
Alliance	Irene Galway	3.89%	371	387.1					
Workers' Party	Peter Cullen	1.21%	116	119.5					
Electorate: 18,813 Valid: 9,549 (50.76%) Spoilt: 332 Quota: 1,592 Turnout: 9,881 (52.52%)

=== Laganbank ===
1989: 2 x UUP, 1 x SDLP, 1 x Alliance, 1 x DUP
1993: 2 x UUP, 2 x SDLP, 1 x Alliance
1989-1993 Change: SDLP gain from DUP

Laganbank - 5 seats
Party	Candidate	FPv%	Count									
Party	Candidate	FPv%	1	2	3	4	5	6	7	8	9	10
UUP	Jim Clarke*	19.44%	1,845									
SDLP	Alasdair McDonnell*	15.80%	1,500	1,500.98	1,508.98	1,530.98	1,533.98	1,571.98	1,644.98			
Alliance	Steve McBride*	8.81%	836	838.66	852.66	867.66	897.08	935.08	992.22	999.22	1,631.22	
SDLP	Peter O'Reilly	11.08%	1,052	1,052	1,058	1,067	1,067	1,086	1,112	1,139	1,200.42	1,490.42
UUP	Michael McGimpsey	5.74%	545	731.9	745.74	747.74	823	832.56	1,075.54	1,075.54	1,133.74	1,136.74
DUP	Caroline Bingham	10.54%	1,000	1,020.44	1,023.58	1,023.72	1,037.28	1,045.28	1,068.1	1,068.1	1,081.1	1,084.8
Sinn Féin	Sean Hayes	9.40%	892	892	892	900	900	907	926	930	931	
Alliance	Hugh Greer	7.66%	727	734.42	744.7	755.7	780.84	834.98	868.54	870.54		
UUP	Dennis Rogan	2.49%	236	261.48	262.76	262.76	300.14	303.28				
Workers' Party	Paddy Lynn	2.34%	222	222.14	239.14	265.42	265.42	290.42				
Green (NI)	Andrew Frew	2.13%	202	203.12	211.68	243.68	244.82					
NI Conservatives	Graham Montgomery	2.09%	198	203.04	204.04	205.04						
Independent Labour	Peter Hadden	1.50%	142	142.42	150.42							
Democratic Left	Michael Craig	1.00%	95	97.1								
Electorate: 20,008 Valid: 9,492 (47.44%) Spoilt: 313 Quota: 1,583 Turnout: 9,805 (49.01%)

=== Lower Falls ===
1989: 3 x Sinn Féin, 2 x SDLP
1993: 4 x Sinn Féin, 1 x SDLP
1989-1993 Change: Sinn Féin gain from SDLP

Lower Falls - 5 seats
Party	Candidate	FPv%	Count					
Party	Candidate	FPv%	1	2	3	4	5	6
Sinn Féin	Tom Hartley	19.79%	2,573					
Sinn Féin	Fra McCann*	18.40%	2,393					
Sinn Féin	Patrick McGeown	18.09%	2,352					
Sinn Féin	Marie Moore	14.97%	1,946	2,316.77				
SDLP	Mary Muldoon*	13.45%	1,749	1,760.39	1,832.92	1,929.38	2,030.98	2,325.98
SDLP	Margaret Walsh	7.59%	987	991.93	1,049.44	1,134.77	1,165.97	1,306.48
Workers' Party	John Lowry	6.11%	794	804.37	831.54	874.47	924.07	
Alliance	Patrick Woods	0.83%	108	109.87				
Democratic Left	Mary McMahon	0.78%	101	105.24				
Electorate: 19,978 Valid: 13,003 (65.09%) Spoilt: 509 Quota: 2,168 Turnout: 13,512 (67.63%)

=== Oldpark ===
1989: 2 x Sinn Féin, 2 x UUP, 1 x SDLP, 1 x Workers' Party
1993: 3 x Sinn Féin, 2 x UUP, 1 x SDLP
1989-1993 Change: Sinn Féin gain from Workers' Party

Oldpark - 6 seats
Party	Candidate	FPv%	Count								
Party	Candidate	FPv%	1	2	3	4	5	6	7	8	9
Sinn Féin	Joe Austin	15.02%	2,229								
UUP	Fred Proctor*	13.78%	2,045	2,045	2,085	2,091	2,138				
SDLP	Martin Morgan	11.88%	1,763	1,766.48	1,768.48	1,817.48	1,903.56	2,028.68	2,553.68		
Sinn Féin	Paddy McManus*	11.92%	1,769	1,810.36	1,810.36	1,822.48	1,836.72	1,840.8	1,852	1,873	1,982.68
Sinn Féin	Bobby Lavery	10.90%	1,617	1,654.12	1,654.12	1,666.2	1,685.72	1,696.04	1,707.12	1,767.12	1,919.64
UUP	Fred Rodgers	9.05%	1,343	1,343	1,394	1,400	1,417	1,542	1,548	1,555	1,724
DUP	David Smylie	8.92%	1,324	1,324.04	1,376.04	1,383.04	1,405.04	1,436.04	1,438.04	1,438.04	1,474.04
Democratic Left	Seamus Lynch*	5.61%	832	833.92	837.92	892.96	962.04	1,118.04	1,154.04	1,352.04	
SDLP	Peter Prendiville	3.96%	588	588.44	590.44	607.44	626.44	645.44			
Alliance	Beatrice Boyd	3.19%	473	473.84	483.84	501.84	584.92				
Green (NI)	Peter Emerson	2.65%	393	394.12	421.12	447.12					
Workers' Party	Margaret Smith	1.75%	259	259.32	261.32						
NI Conservatives	David Tarr	1.39%	206	206							
Electorate: 25,943 Valid: 14,841 (57.21%) Spoilt: 532 Quota: 2,121 Turnout: 15,373 (59.26%)

=== Pottinger ===
1989: 2 x DUP, 2 x UUP, 1 x Alliance, 1 Independent Unionist
1993: 3 x DUP, 2 x UUP, 1 x Alliance
1989-1993 Change: DUP gain from Independent Unionist

Pottinger - 6 seats
Party	Candidate	FPv%	Count							
Party	Candidate	FPv%	1	2	3	4	5	6	7	8
DUP	Sammy Wilson*	25.52%	2,784							
Alliance	Mervyn Jones*	12.99%	1,417	1,427.35	1,461.35	1,476.15	1,700.15			
DUP	Jim Walker*	7.27%	793	1,476.55	1,478.55	1,549.15	1,566.15			
UUP	Reg Empey*	11.87%	1,295	1,380.95	1,381.95	1,408.8	1,418.8	1,428.8	1,612.8	
DUP	Robert Cleland	9.00%	982	1,252.45	1,254.45	1,307.9	1,324.8	1,326.8	1,379.45	1,388.45
UUP	Alexander Blair	8.22%	897	919.05	921.05	931.95	960.3	979.3	1,070.15	1,080.15
UUP	Margaret Clarke*	6.91%	754	778.75	782.2	790.1	802.55	807.55	926.65	939.65
Sinn Féin	Joseph O'Donnell	6.50%	709	709	713	714	754	769	771	
NI Conservatives	Dorothy Dunlop*	4.93%	538	574	580	595.15	624.15	644.15		
Independent Labour	Colin Ballentine	2.48%	271	273.25	297.25	305.25				
Workers' Party	Joseph Bell	2.08%	227	228.35	240.35	243.8				
Ind. Unionist	Samuel Walker	1.22%	133	214.9	216.9					
Green (NI)	Thaddeus Bradley	0.98%	107	108.35						
Electorate: 24,293 Valid: 10,907 (44.90%) Spoilt: 482 Quota: 1,559 Turnout: 11,389 (46.89%)

=== Upper Falls ===
1989: 3 x Sinn Féin, 2 x SDLP
1993: 3 x Sinn Féin, 2 x SDLP
1989-1993 Change: No change

Upper Falls - 5 seats
Party	Candidate	FPv%	Count								
Party	Candidate	FPv%	1	2	3	4	5	6	7	8	9
SDLP	Alex Attwood*	24.08%	3,203								
Sinn Féin	Una Gillespie	20.79%	2,765								
Sinn Féin	Alex Maskey*	20.56%	2,735								
Sinn Féin	Mairtin O'Muilleoir*	15.74%	2,093	2,114.12	2,629.32						
SDLP	Patricia Lewsley	6.00%	798	1,428.72	1,437.72	1,602.89	1,623.89	1,625.89	1,670.62	1,774.2	2,122.7
SDLP	Terence Tracey	5.28%	702	888.24	891.64	1,007.84	1,019.24	1,027.24	1,059.73	1,167.52	1,327.21
Ind. Nationalist	Cormac Boomer*	2.84%	378	474.96	477.56	582.14	594.34	595.34	626.15	744.45	
Independent Labour	Billy Lynn	1.08%	144	154.24	158.24	242.9	260.7	271.85	298.53		
Alliance	Julie Greaves	1.09%	145	173.8	175.4	186.19	187.39	253.59	266.7		
Workers' Party	James Maxwell	1.23%	164	171.36	173.56	206.76	208.36	217.36			
DUP	David McNerlin	1.31%	174	174.64	174.64	176.3	176.7				
Electorate: 21,948 Valid: 13,301 (60.60%) Spoilt: 424 Quota: 2,217 Turnout: 13,725 (62.53%)

=== Victoria ===
1989: 3 x UUP, 2 x Alliance, 2 x DUP
1993: 3 x UUP, 2 x Alliance, 2 x DUP
1989-1993 Change: No change

Victoria - 7 seats
Party	Candidate	FPv%	Count								
Party	Candidate	FPv%	1	2	3	4	5	6	7	8	9
Alliance	John Alderdice*	24.67%	3,337								
DUP	Wallace Browne*	15.92%	2,153								
UUP	Thomas Patton*	13.31%	1,801								
DUP	Robin Newton*	12.78%	1,729								
UUP	Ian Adamson*	9.73%	1,316	1,395.56	1,547.81	1,564.23	1,686.5	1,880.5			
Alliance	Danny Dow*	4.08%	552	1,543.44	1,564.9	1,642.89	1,661.29	1,761.29			
UUP	Jim Rodgers	4.44%	600	631.62	749.07	757.18	1,091.36	1,274.11	1,408.11	1,560.65	1,510.25
Alliance	Maureen McConnell	5.68%	768	1,159.68	1,169.54	1,220.19	1,226.21	1,368.9	1,387.9	1,393.92	1,454.4
NI Conservatives	Jim McCormick	5.06%	684	759.99	784.93	807.3	828.13				
UUP	John Norris	3.01%	407	435.56	554.17	561.97					
Green (NI)	Michael Bell	1.33%	180	218.76	225.72						
Electorate: 29,632 Valid: 13,527 (45.65%) Spoilt: 360 Quota: 1,691 Turnout: 13,887 (46.86%)
