= 1989 Belfast City Council election =

Northern Ireland local election

← 1985	17 May 1989	1993 →

All 51 seats to Belfast City Council 26 seats needed for a majority
	First party	Second party	Third party
Party	UUP	Sinn Féin	SDLP
Seats won	14	8	8
Seat change	0	▲1	▲2
	Fourth party	Fifth party	Sixth party
Party	DUP	Alliance	Ind. Unionist
Seats won	8	6	4
Seat change	▼3	▼2	▲2
	Seventh party	Eighth party	Ninth party
Party	Workers' Party	PUP	Protestant Unionist
Seats won	1	1	1
Seat change	0	0	0
Lord Mayor before election
Nigel Dodds
DUP
Lord Mayor
Reg Empey
UUP

Elections to Belfast City Council were held on 17 May 1989 on the same day as the other Northern Irish local government elections. The election used nine district electoral areas to elect a total of 51 councillors, most representing the more heavily populated north and west.

The UUP remained the largest party, and Reg Empey became the Lord Mayor.

== Election results ==
Belfast local election result 1989
Party	Seats	Gains	Losses	Net gain/loss	Seats %	Votes %	Votes	+/−
UUP	14	1	1	0	27.5	21.7	22,846	▼2.7
Sinn Féin	8	1	0	▲1	15.7	18.7	19,688	▲3.1
SDLP	8	2	0	▲2	15.7	16.1	16,937	▲1.9
DUP	8	0	3	▼3	15.7	14.8	15,618	▼5.1
Alliance	6	0	2	▼2	11.8	10.9	11,479	▼0.6
Ind. Unionist	4	2	0	▲2	7.8	6.7	7,013	▲3.2
Workers' Party	1	0	0	0	2.0	5.3	5,571	▲1.5
PUP	1	0	0	0	2.0	2.5	2,533	▲0.3
Protestant Unionist	1	0	0	0	2.0	1.3	1,408	▼1.3
Ulster Democratic	0	0	0	0	0.0	0.9	908	▲0.4
Independent	0	0	0	0	0.0	0.7	717	▲0.7
Labour Party NI	0	0	0	0	0.0	0.2	212	New
Communist	0	0	0	0	0.0	0.2	175	0.0
Green (NI)	0	0	0	0	0.0	0.08	95	New
National Front	0	0	0	0	0.0	0.02	27	New

Note: "Votes" are the first preference votes.

== Districts summary ==
Results of the Belfast City Council election, 1989 by district
Ward	%	Cllrs	%	Cllrs	%	Cllrs	%	Cllrs	%	Cllrs	%	Cllrs	%	Cllrs	%	Cllrs	Total Cllrs
Ward	UUP		Sinn Féin		SDLP		DUP		Alliance		Workers' Party		PUP		Others		Total Cllrs
Balmoral	34.9	2	0.0	0	14.3	1	19.3	1	19.0	1	2.1	0	0.0	0	10.4	0	5
Castle	24.6	1	3.8	0	19.2	1	16.6	1	8.8	1	4.1	0	0.0	0	22.9	2	6
Court	19.8	1	2.3	0	0.0	0	15.8	1	0.0	0	3.5	0	24.2	1	34.4	2	6
Laganbank	31.6	2	7.7	0	20.8	1	12.0	1	19.0	1	4.9	0	0.0	0	4.0	0	5
Lower Falls	0.0	0	61.0	3	28.5	2	0.0	0	1.2	0	9.3	0	0.0	0	0.0	0	5
Oldpark	22.8	2	37.8	3	8.9	0	15.8	1	3.3	0	11.4	1	0.0	0	0.0	0	6
Pottinger	25.7	2	5.8	0	0.0	0	40.1	2	12.1	1	5.0	0	0.0	0	11.3	1	6
Upper Falls	0.0	0	49.5	2	41.9	2	2.2	0	2.6	0	3.1	0	0.0	0	0.7	0	5
Victoria	39.5	3	0.0	0	0.0	0	23.7	2	31.0	2	2.5	0	0.0	0	3.3	0	7
Total	21.7	14	18.7	8	16.1	8	14.8	8	10.9	6	5.3	1	2.5	1	10.0	5	51

== District results ==
=== Balmoral ===
1985: 2 x UUP, 2 x DUP, 1 x Alliance
1989: 2 x UUP, 2 x DUP, 1 x Alliance, 1 x SDLP
1985-1989 Change: SDLP gain from DUP

Balmoral - 5 seats
Party	Candidate	FPv%	Count						
Party	Candidate	FPv%	1	2	3	4	5	6	7
UUP	Mary Crooks*	18.97%	2,163						
UUP	Jim Kirkpatrick*	15.94%	1,818	1,968.72					
DUP	John Parkes*	14.05%	1,602	1,631.76	1,997.76				
Alliance	Mark Long	9.69%	1,105	1,111	1,178.68	1,182.37	1,188.37	2,118.37	
SDLP	Dorita Field	14.35%	1,636	1,637.08	1,708.32	1,708.73	1,708.85	1,778.63	1,888.89
Ind. Unionist	William Dickson*	10.32%	1,177	1,207.84	1,418.56	1,505.89	1,558.09	1,639.9	1,743.87
Alliance	John Montgomery*	9.30%	1,061	1,067.24	1,152.32	1,157.65	1,162.09		
DUP	Caroline Bingham	5.25%	599	626					
Workers' Party	Shaun McKeown	2.14%	243	243.72					
Electorate: 23,343 Valid: 11,404 (48.85%) Spoilt: 314 Quota: 1,901 Turnout: 11,718 (50.20%)

=== Castle ===
1985: 2 x UUP, 1 SDLP, 1 x DUP, 1 x Alliance, 1 x Independent Unionist
1989: 2 x Independent Unionist, 1 x UUP, 1 SDLP, 1 x DUP, 1 x Alliance
1985-1989 Change: Independent Unionist gain from UUP

Castle - 6 seats
Party	Candidate	FPv%	Count							
Party	Candidate	FPv%	1	2	3	4	5	6	7	8
SDLP	Alban Maginness*	19.17%	2,301							
UUP	John Carson*	18.26%	2,192							
DUP	Nigel Dodds*	14.82%	1,779							
Alliance	Tom Campbell*	8.77%	1,053	1,384.02	1,405.36	1,405.63	1,488.77	1,493.04	1,591.75	1,855.75
Ind. Unionist	Frank Millar*	11.54%	1,385	1,386.62	1,455.7	1,460.44	1,475.44	1,559.34	1,561.16	1,618.15
Ind. Unionist	Nelson McCausland	9.69%	1,163	1,163	1,270.36	1,276.3	1,280.1	1,390.64	1,392.76	1,433.56
UUP	Alfred Redpath*	6.39%	767	771.05	993.25	996.76	1,003.74	1,053.35	1,061.95	1,118.56
Workers' Party	Anthony Kerr	4.13%	496	612.37	619.85	620.24	714.69	724.37	864.13	
Sinn Féin	Bobby Lavery*	3.77%	453	510.78	511.22	511.43	527.37	527.37		
DUP	Samuel Lowry	1.80%	216	216.27	254.11	291.13	294.13			
Green (NI)	Maria O'Sullivan	0.79%	95	139.28	140.16	140.19				
Labour '87	Thomas Galloway	0.86%	103	124.87	127.95	128.04				
Electorate: 24,488 Valid: 12,003 (49.02%) Spoilt: 323 Quota: 1,715 Turnout: 12,326 (50.33%)

=== Court ===
1985: 2 x UUP, 1 x DUP, 1 x PUP, 1 x Protestant Unionist, 1 x Independent Unionist
1989: 2 x UUP, 1 x DUP, 1 x PUP, 1 x Protestant Unionist, 1 x Independent Unionist
1985-1989 Change: No change

Court - 6 seats
Party	Candidate	FPv%	Count						
Party	Candidate	FPv%	1	2	3	4	5	6	7
PUP	Hugh Smyth*	24.25%	2,533						
Protestant Unionist	Elizabeth Seawright	13.48%	1,408	1,768.36					
UUP	Fred Cobain*	11.20%	1,170	1,253.16	1,289.54	1,294.54	1,334.82	1,468.84	1,669.84
DUP	Eric Smyth	9.63%	1,006	1,158.04	1,197.48	1,199.48	1,220.08	1,276.5	1,559.5
Ind. Unionist	Joseph Coggle*	9.12%	953	1,134.02	1,212.9	1,217.9	1,253.74	1,349.08	1,439.04
UUP	Herbert Ditty*	8.59%	897	962.52	1,002.98	1,005.32	1,030.92	1,208.88	1,309.8
Independent	William Smith	6.87%	717	809.4	847.82	849.82	932.84	979.16	1,008.36
DUP	Frederick Ashby*	6.17%	644	673.82	688.1	688.1	703.78	762.72	
Ind. Unionist	Alfie Ferguson	4.87%	509	562.34	583.08	583.08	625.5		
Workers' Party	Peter Cullen	3.51%	367	374.98	379.06	467.06			
Sinn Féin	Joe Austin	2.30%	240	240.42	240.76				
Electorate: 21,173 Valid: 10,444 (49.33%) Spoilt: 381 Quota: 1,493 Turnout: 10,825 (51.13%)

=== Laganbank ===
1985: 2 x UUP, 1 x SDLP, 1 x Alliance, 1 x DUP
1989: 2 x UUP, 1 x SDLP, 1 x Alliance, 1 x DUP
1985-1989 Change: No change

Laganbank - 5 seats
Party	Candidate	FPv%	Count								
Party	Candidate	FPv%	1	2	3	4	5	6	7	8	9
SDLP	Alasdair McDonnell*	14.43%	1,415	1,424	1,440	1,558	2,134				
UUP	Dixie Gilmore*	15.25%	1,496	1,497	1,567	1,579	1,579	1,580	2,080		
Alliance	Steve McBride	11.29%	1,107	1,110	1,147	1,243	1,282	1,490	1,497	1,500.84	1,602.84
UUP	Jim Clarke	8.71%	854	859	901	903	903	903	1,128	1,445.76	1,448.76
DUP	Rhonda Paisley*	10.56%	1,036	1,037	1,171	1,179	1,180	1,180	1,278	1,346.16	1,349.16
Alliance	Mary Thomas	7.70%	755	757	780	898	937	1,126	1,130	1,131.92	1,209.92
Sinn Féin	James Clinton	7.68%	753	775	776	799	811	836	837	837.96	
UUP	Harry Fletcher	7.68%	753	753	813	816	816	816			
SDLP	Gerard McKettrick	6.41%	629	635	638	700					
Workers' Party	Kevin Smyth	4.88%	479	503	553						
Ind. Unionist	Margaret Dickson	2.02%	198	198							
DUP	Benjamin Horan	1.35%	132	133							
Labour '87	Paul Hainsworth	1.11%	109	123							
Communist	Barry Bruton	0.93%	91								
Electorate: 20,689 Valid: 9,807 (47.40%) Spoilt: 372 Quota: 1,635 Turnout: 10,179 (49.20%)

=== Lower Falls ===
1985: 3 x Sinn Féin, 1 x SDLP, 1 x Alliance
1989: 3 x Sinn Féin, 2 x SDLP
1985-1989 Change: SDLP gain from Alliance

Lower Falls - 5 seats
Party	Candidate	FPv%	Count				
Party	Candidate	FPv%	1	2	3	4	5
SDLP	Joe Hendron*	23.51%	2,748				
Sinn Féin	Fra McCann	19.73%	2,307				
Sinn Féin	Elizabeth Fitzsimons*	15.10%	1,765	1,786.7	1,816.25	1,849.69	1,885.5
Sinn Féin	Sean McKnight*	12.22%	1,428	1,461.48	1,466.72	1,750.56	1,774.62
SDLP	Mary Muldoon	5.03%	588	1,196.84	1,257.51	1,261.19	1,738.98
Sinn Féin	Richard May	13.91%	1,626	1,634.68	1,637.68	1,651.92	1,679.45
Workers' Party	Mary McMahon	9.35%	1,093	1,186	1,218.75	1,224.19	
Alliance	Derrick Crothers	1.15%	135	164.45			
Electorate: 20,095 Valid: 11,690 (58.17%) Spoilt: 570 Quota: 1,949 Turnout: 12,260 (61.01%)

=== Oldpark ===
1985: 2 x Sinn Féin, 1 x UUP, 1 x SDLP, 1 x DUP, 1 x Workers' Party
1989: 2 x Sinn Féin, 2 x UUP, 1 x SDLP, 1 x Workers' Party
1985-1989 Change: UUP gain from DUP

Oldpark - 6 seats
Party	Candidate	FPv%	Count					
Party	Candidate	FPv%	1	2	3	4	5	6
SDLP	Brian Feeney*	18.38%	2,426					
Workers' Party	Seamus Lynch*	12.42%	1,639	1,912.6				
UUP	Fred Proctor*	14.02%	1,850	1,850.96	1,976.96			
UUP	William Gault	9.05%	780	782.64	886.56	951.36	1,491.96	2,050.96
Sinn Féin	Gerard McGuigan*	12.75%	1,682	1,706.96	1,723.84	1,723.84	1,723.84	1,725.84
Sinn Féin	Paddy McManus	11.73%	1,548	1,572.24	1,585.2	1,586.1	1,588.1	1,592.82
Sinn Féin	William McGarry	8.45%	1,115	1,153.16	1,187.2	1,187.2	1,188.44	1,206
Ulster Democratic	Patrick Bird	6.34%	837	837.72	883.36	896.86	1,117.84	
DUP	Stanley Mulholland	6.10%	805	805.24	839.4	851.1		
Alliance	George Jones	3.36%	443	610.52				
Ulster Democratic	William Clark	0.54%	71	71.24				
Electorate: 25,895 Valid: 13,196 (50.96%) Spoilt: 548 Quota: 1,886 Turnout: 13,744 (53.08%)

=== Pottinger ===
1985: 3 x DUP, 2 x UUP, 1 x Alliance
1989: 2 x DUP, 2 x UUP, 1 x Alliance, 1 Independent Unionist
1985-1989 Change: Independent Unionist gain from DUP

Pottinger - 6 seats
Party	Candidate	FPv%	Count					
Party	Candidate	FPv%	1	2	3	4	5	6
DUP	Sammy Wilson*	25.88%	2,780					
UUP	Margaret Clarke*	13.78%	1,480	1,524.55	1,537.55			
Alliance	Mervyn Jones*	12.07%	1,296	1,309.05	1,314.3	1,326.75	1,599.75	
DUP	Jim Walker*	4.59%	493	1,268.35	1,479.35	1,531.7	1,546.7	
Ind. Unionist	Dorothy Dunlop	10.98%	1,179	1,225.8	1,245.75	1,313.9	1,344.35	1,357.35
UUP	Reg Empey*	8.04%	864	921.15	942.1	1,210.2	1,220.2	1,226.2
DUP	Frank Leslie*	7.15%	768	900.3	1,015	1,044.05	1,056.5	1,064.4
Sinn Féin	Joseph O'Donnell	5.86%	629	629.45	631.9	631.9	677.9	
Workers' Party	Sean Flanagan	5.04%	541	543.7	546.7	548.7		
UUP	David McNutt	3.91%	420	447	457.15			
DUP	John Norris	2.45%	263	381.8				
National Front	Stuart McCullough	0.25%	27	29.7				
Electorate: 24,265 Valid: 10,740 (44.26%) Spoilt: 508 Quota: 1,535 Turnout: 11,248 (46.35%)

=== Upper Falls ===
1985: 2 x Sinn Féin, 2 x SDLP, 1 x Alliance
1989: 3 x Sinn Féin, 2 x SDLP
1985-1989 Change: Sinn Féin gain from Alliance

Upper Falls - 5 seats
Party	Candidate	FPv%	Count						
Party	Candidate	FPv%	1	2	3	4	5	6	7
SDLP	Alex Attwood*	26.53%	3,292						
Sinn Féin	Alex Maskey*	19.26%	2,378						
Sinn Féin	Teresa Holland*	18.77%	2,329						
SDLP	Cormac Boomer*	9.58%	1,189	2,202.46					
Sinn Féin	Mairtin O'Muilleoir	15.74%	1,435	1,462.74	1,739.64	1,976.47	2,000.75	2,004.3	2,004.67
SDLP	Peter Prendiville	5.75%	713	815.98	819.1	820.97	834.35	935.6	962.75
Alliance	Dan McGuinness	2.63%	326	363.24	365.71	368.35	374.73	384.88	505.88
Workers' Party	Jean Craig	3.06%	380	409.64	411.72	413.48	432.48	443.83	488.83
DUP	Robert Morrow	2.28%	283	283	283.39	283.72	283.72	283.97	
Communist	Kevin O'Donnell	0.68%	84	87.04	89.77	90.54			
Electorate: 22,975 Valid: 12,409 (54.01%) Spoilt: 426 Quota: 2,069 Turnout: 12,835 (55.87%)

=== Victoria ===
1985: 3 x UUP, 2 x Alliance, 2 x DUP
1989: 3 x UUP, 2 x Alliance, 2 x DUP
1985-1989 Change: No change

Victoria - 7 seats
Party	Candidate	FPv%	Count					
Party	Candidate	FPv%	1	2	3	4	5	6
Alliance	John Alderdice	21.67%	2,933					
UUP	Thomas Patton*	21.02%	2,845					
UUP	Ian Adamson	12.78%	1,730					
DUP	Wallace Browne*	10.15%	1,374	1,407.97	1,512.97	1,523.34	1,585.51	1,890.51
DUP	Robin Newton*	8.65%	1,171	1,177.88	1,274.06	1,287.33	1,346.33	1,644.33
Alliance	Danny Dow	5.41%	732	1,405.38	1,475.94	1,617.36	1,685.17	1,696.17
UUP	Alan Montgomery	5.67%	767	821.61	1,496.55	1,521.91	1,641.98	1,692.98
Alliance	George Thompson*	3.94%	533	937.2	963.66	1,041.39	1,110.23	1,117.23
DUP	Irene Lewis	4.93%	667	685.49	776.63	786.05	846.22	
Ind. Unionist	Samuel Walker	3.32%	449	469.64	520.46	555.74		
Workers' Party	Hugh Jordan	2.46%	333	359.23	378.97			
Electorate: 30,508 Valid: 13,534 (44.36%) Spoilt: 367 Quota: 1,692 Turnout: 13,901 (45.57%)
