= 1985 Belfast City Council election =

Northern Ireland local election

← 1981	17 May 1985	1989 →

All 51 seats to Belfast City Council 26 seats needed for a majority
	First party	Second party	Third party
Party	UUP	DUP	Alliance
Seats won	14	11	8
Seat change	▲1	▼4	▲1
	Fourth party	Fifth party	Sixth party
Party	Sinn Féin	SDLP	Ind. Unionist
Seats won	7	6	2
Seat change	▲7	0	▲1
	Seventh party	Eighth party	Ninth party
Party	Workers' Party	PUP	Protestant Unionist
Seats won	1	1	1
Seat change	▲1	0	▲1
Lord Mayor before election
Alfie Ferguson
UUP
Lord Mayor
John Carson
UUP

Elections to Belfast City Council were held on 15 May 1985 on the same day as the other Northern Irish local government elections. The election used nine district electoral areas to elect a total of 51 councillors, most representing the more heavily populated north and west.

The UUP became the largest party, overtaking the DUP and John Carson became the Lord Mayor.

== Election results ==
Belfast local election result 1985
Party	Seats	Gains	Losses	Net gain/loss	Seats %	Votes %	Votes	+/−
UUP	14	1	0	▲1	27.5	24.4	28,165	▲0.7
DUP	11	0	4	▼3	21.6	19.9	23,052	▼5.9
Alliance	8	1	0	▲1	15.7	11.5	13,286	▼1.7
Sinn Féin	7	7	0	▲7	13.7	15.6	18,077	New
SDLP	6	0	0	0	11.8	14.2	16,479	▲0.1
Ind. Unionist	2	1	0	▲1	3.9	3.5	4,091	▲1.6
Workers' Party	1	1	0	▲1	2.0	3.8	4,432	▼0.1
Protestant Unionist	1	1	0	▲1	2.0	2.6	2,970	▲2.6
PUP	1	0	0	0	2.0	2.2	2,588	▲0.3
People's Democracy	0	0	2	▼1	0.0	0.1	131	▼3.6
Ulster Democratic	0	0	1	▼1	0.0	0.5	536	▼1.8
Labour Party NI	0	0	0	0	0.0	0.6	731	New
Labour and Trade Union	0	0	0	0	0.0	0.5	556	New
Green (NI)	0	0	0	0	0.0	0.3	308	New
Communist	0	0	0	0	0.0	0.2	245	0.0

Note: "Votes" are the first preference votes.

== Districts summary ==
Results of the Belfast City Council election, 1985 by district
Ward	%	Cllrs	%	Cllrs	%	Cllrs	%	Cllrs	%	Cllrs	%	Cllrs	%	Cllrs	%	Cllrs	Total Cllrs
Ward	UUP		DUP		Alliance		Sinn Féin		SDLP		Workers' Party		PUP		Others		Total Cllrs
Balmoral	41.7	2	25.5	2	18.5	1	0.0	0	10.4	0	1.0	0	0.0	0	2.9	0	5
Castle	32.7	2	17.1	1	9.6	1	0.0	0	19.6	1	3.4	0	0.0	0	17.6	1	6
Court	21.6	2	17.9	1	5.1	0	3.5	0	0.0	0	1.3	0	24.2	1	36.1	2	6
Laganbank	30.0	2	22.1	1	20.8	1	16.9	1	5.6	0	5.0	0	0.0	0	2.1	0	5
Lower Falls	0.0	0	0.0	0	9.4	1	57.2	3	23.4	1	9.4	0	0.0	0	0.6	0	5
Oldpark	17.5	1	11.4	1	3.7	0	28.5	2	16.1	1	9.4	1	3.0	0	10.4	0	6
Pottinger	28.9	2	47.5	3	8.3	1	4.6	0	2.8	0	2.4	0	3.2	0	2.3	0	6
Upper Falls	0.0	0	2.9	0	7.3	1	44.1	2	39.2	2	3.1	0	0.0	0	3.4	0	5
Victoria	42.5	3	33.2	2	23.1	2	0.0	0	1.2	0	0.0	0	0.0	0	0.0	0	7
Total	24.4	14	19.9	11	11.5	8	15.6	7	14.2	6	3.8	1	2.2	1	8.4	3	51

== District results ==
=== Balmoral ===
1985: 2 x UUP, 2 x DUP, 1 x Alliance

Balmoral - 5 seats
Party	Candidate	FPv%	Count							
Party	Candidate	FPv%	1	2	3	4	5	6	7	8
UUP	Mary Crooks*	19.07%	2,438							
UUP	Jim Kirkpatrick	14.23%	1,820	2,014.16	2,061.12	2,137.12				
DUP	William Dickson*	12.81%	1,638	1,660.56	1,676.68	1,931.32	2,321.32			
Alliance	John Montgomery	10.37%	1,326	1,329.12	1,426.48	1,430.6	1,488.68	1,497.39	2,449.39	
DUP	John Parkes	7.80%	998	1,009.28	1,032.64	1,281.76	1,536	1,691.44	1,780.22	1,908.19
SDLP	Dorita Field	10.42%	1,332	1,332.24	1,446.24	1,448.24	1,457.24	1,457.24	1,587.04	1,772.63
Alliance	David Cook*	8.15%	1,042	1,054	1,180.48	1,191.08	1,345.04	1,367.82		
UUP	James Stewart*	8.38%	1,071	1,102.08	1,127.68	1,166.44				
DUP	Clarke Gibson	7.80%	620	633.68	646.8					
Labour Party NI	Stanley Graham	1.45%	186	187.08						
Workers' Party	Shaun McKeown	1.04%	133	133.12						
Ind. Unionist	Victor Brennan	0.99%	127	127.6						
Ind. Unionist	William Stevenson*	0.44%	56	57.44						
Electorate: 23,220 Valid: 12,787 (55.07%) Spoilt: 315 Quota: 2,132 Turnout: 13,102 (56.43%)

=== Castle ===
1985: 2 x UUP, 1 x SDLP, 1 x DUP, 1 x Alliance, 1 x Independent Unionist

Castle - 6 seats
Party	Candidate	FPv%	Count							
Party	Candidate	FPv%	1	2	3	4	5	6	7	8
UUP	John Carson*	24.23%	3,153							
SDLP	Alban Maginness	15.19%	1,977							
Ind. Unionist	Frank Millar*	12.47%	1,623	1,812.83	1,813.08	1,836.49	1,863.28			
DUP	Nigel Dodds	11.54%	1,502	1,622.95	1,623	1,625.05	1,632.51	2,179.51		
UUP	Alfred Redpath	8.51%	1,107	1,783.5	1,783.5	1,797.73	1,821.83	1,916.83		
Alliance	Tom Campbell	6.14%	799	822.37	825.42	919.79	1,333.54	1,337.77	1,351.99	1,870.99
Ind. Unionist	William Gault*	5.18%	674	892.94	893.04	903.86	915.55	980.31	1,280.51	1,281.51
SDLP	John Murphy	4.45%	579	581.87	672.17	864.67	885.52	885.52	887.89	
DUP	Michael Whittley	5.43%	706	726.5	726.5	733.5	739.32			
Alliance	Robert Jamison	3.45%	449	474.42	475.87	530.04				
Workers' Party	Katherine Johnston	3.41%	444	448.51	451.06					
Electorate: 24,488 Valid: 12,003 (49.02%) Spoilt: 323 Quota: 1,715 Turnout: 12,326 (50.33%)

=== Court ===
1985: 2 x UUP, 1 x DUP, 1 x PUP, 1 x Protestant Unionist, 1 x Independent Unionist

Court - 6 seats
Party	Candidate	FPv%	Count								
Party	Candidate	FPv%	1	2	3	4	5	6	7	8	9
Protestant Unionist	George Seawright*	24.39%	2,970								
PUP	Hugh Smyth*	14.46%	1,761								
DUP	Frederick Ashby*	11.66%	1,420	1,591.36	1,593.78	1,681.1	1,682.1	1,732.92	2,186.92		
UUP	Herbert Ditty	9.83%	1,197	1,288.98	1,296.98	1,312.28	1,313.28	1,618.2	1,695.52	1,781.52	
UUP	Fred Cobain	6.60%	804	846	847	856.1	858.1	1,028.28	1,101.26	1,216.26	1,457.46
Ind. Unionist	Joseph Coggle*	7.34%	894	1,134.66	1,139.08	1,144.76	1,146.76	1,201.2	1,266.44	1,336.44	1,471.32
Ulster Democratic	Samuel Doyle	4.40%	536	837.56	842.98	859.22	860.22	946.5	1,004.12	1,050.12	1,097.32
Alliance	William Dukelow	5.14%	626	642.38	730.8	732.64	874.64	899.16	907	914	
DUP	William Baxter	4.70%	572	706.4	708.82	800.34	800.34	826.64			
UUP	James Sands	5.13%	624	750	751	773.24	773.24				
Sinn Féin	Harry Fitzsimmons	3.55%	432	432.42	463.42	463.42					
DUP	Robert Morrow	1.49%	182	260.96	261.38						
Workers' Party	Peter Cullen	1.29%	157	161.62							
Electorate: 22,375 Valid: 12,175 (54.41%) Spoilt: 372 Quota: 1,740 Turnout: 12,547 (56.08%)

=== Laganbank ===
1985: 2 x UUP, 1 x DUP, 1 x SDLP, 1 x Alliance

Laganbank - 5 seats
Party	Candidate	FPv%	Count								
Party	Candidate	FPv%	1	2	3	4	5	6	7	8	9
UUP	William Blair*	17.92%	1,969								
Alliance	William McDowell	12.97%	1,425	1,456	1,808	1,811.15	1,841.15				
SDLP	Alasdair McDonnell*	10.69%	1,175	1,194	1,220	1,220.35	1,448.35	1,449.56	1,797.63	2,727.63	
UUP	Dixie Gilmore	6.62%	727	733	741	841.8	844.94	1,358.26	1,387.61	1,398.61	1,513.61
DUP	Rhonda Paisley	12.06%	1,325	1,334	1,338	1,344.51	1,344.51	1,408.98	1,419.33	1,419.33	1,427.33
DUP	Raymond McCrea*	10.03%	1,102	1,107	1,108	1,116.61	1,117.61	1,146.52	1,152.59	1,152.59	1,160.59
SDLP	Gerard McKettrick	7.58%	833	844	876	876	949	949	1,068		
Workers' Party	Gerard Carr	5.01%	550	635	655	656.19	755.26	757.33			
UUP	Robert Wilson	5.50%	604	615	617	632.47	632.54				
Sinn Féin	Michael Conlon	5.59%	614	624	627	627.35					
Alliance	Dan McGuinness	3.95%	434	455							
Labour and Trade Union	Robert Millar	0.91%	100								
NI Labour	John King	0.66%	73								
Communist	Michael Morrissey	0.52%	57								
Electorate: 20,934 Valid: 10,988 (52.49%) Spoilt: 297 Quota: 1,832 Turnout: 11,285 (53.91%)

=== Lower Falls ===
1985: 3 x Sinn Féin, 1 x SDLP, 1 x Alliance

Lower Falls - 5 seats
Party	Candidate	FPv%	Count			
Party	Candidate	FPv%	1	2	3	4
SDLP	Joe Hendron*	22.06%	2,606			
Sinn Féin	Sean McKnight	16.41%	1,939	1,963	1,985.4	
Alliance	Will Glendinning*	9.42%	1,113	1,195	1,549.48	2,015.48
Sinn Féin	Sean Keenan	14.83%	1,752	1,764	1,795.36	1,845.2
Sinn Féin	Elizabeth Fitzsimons	13.50%	1,595	1,609	1,649.6	1,697.4
Sinn Féin	Fra McCann	12.42%	1,467	1,472	1,499.44	1,552.4
Workers' Party	Mary McMahon	9.44%	1,115	1,168	1,312.2	
SDLP	Sean Mullan	1.35%	159			
Communist	Desmond Murray	0.57%	67			
Electorate: 21,058 Valid: 11,813 (56.10%) Spoilt: 450 Quota: 1,969 Turnout: 12,263 (58.23%)

=== Oldpark ===
1985: 2 x Sinn Féin, 1 x UUP, 1 x SDLP, 1 x DUP, 1 x Workers' Party

Oldpark - 6 seats
Party	Candidate	FPv%	Count												
Party	Candidate	FPv%	1	2	3	4	5	6	7	8	9	10	11	12	13
UUP	Fred Proctor	12.54%	1,800	1,820	1,903	1,918	2,013	2,125							
Sinn Féin	Bobby Lavery	12.20%	1,752	1,765	1,766	1,786	1,793	1,794	2,373						
Sinn Féin	Gerard McGuigan	10.93%	1,570	1,576	1,576	1,585	1,591	1,591	1,726	2,030.7					
SDLP	Brian Feeney*	10.56%	1,516	1,544	1,544	1,677	1,841	1,842	1,863	1,867.4	1,867.4	2,475.4			
Workers' Party	Seamus Lynch	9.36%	1,344	1,383	1,386	1,531	1,696	1,701	1,731	1,735.4	1,735.4	1,895.5	2,226.5		
DUP	Peter Lunn	6.67%	958	974	1,054	1,056	1,082	1,523	1,523	1,523	1,537.6	1,539.6	1,542.6	1,549.6	1,824.6
UUP	David Smylie	4.94%	709	717	813	817	857	983	985	985	1,036.83	1,039.83	1,041.83	1,066.83	1,573.83
Ind. Unionist	Nelson McCausland	4.99%	717	729	815	825	872	919	920	920	926.57	930.57	934.57	951.57	
SDLP	Patrick Hunter	5.48%	787	812	814	867	913	913	922	924.2	924.2				
Sinn Féin	Paddy McManus	5.39%	774	781	781	787	787	787							
DUP	Pauline Whittley	4.76%	684	691	735	739	748								
Alliance	Arnold Carton	3.73%	535	597	618	695									
Labour Party NI	Paddy Devlin*	3.29%	472	506	518										
PUP	Patrick Bird	3.02%	433	444											
Green (NI)	Peter Emerson	2.14%	308												
Electorate: 25,774 Valid: 14,359 (55.71%) Spoilt: 389 Quota: 2,052 Turnout: 14,748 (57.22%)

=== Pottinger ===
1985: 3 x DUP, 2 x UUP, 1 x Alliance

Pottinger - 6 seats
Party	Candidate	FPv%	Count							
Party	Candidate	FPv%	1	2	3	4	5	6	7	8
DUP	Sammy Wilson*	19.99%	2,454							
DUP	Frank Leslie	18.11%	2,224							
UUP	Margaret Clarke	16.28%	1,999							
DUP	Jim Walker	9.39%	1,153	1,763.12						
UUP	Reg Empey	9.10%	1,117	1,143.6	1,442.8	1,630.12	1,659.16	1,660.5	1,756.5	
Alliance	Mervyn Jones	8.30%	1,019	1,026.56	1,039.48	1,044.64	1,127.4	1,272.74	1,309.88	1,547.28
UUP	Harry Fletcher	3.51%	431	449.2	546.1	569.38	594.16	595.16	706.38	727.66
Sinn Féin	Joseph O'Donnell	4.61%	566	566	566	566	572.28	634.6	635.6	713.42
Workers' Party	Francis Cullen	2.47%	303	304.12	306.5	312.02	398.48	496.48	514.94	
PUP	David Ervine	3.21%	394	402.12	442.58	448.1	459.68	460.68		
SDLP	Carmel Maginness	2.77%	340	340.28	342.32	342.32	353.66			
Labour and Trade Union	Stan Dempsey	1.78%	218	219.68	227.16	232.44				
Communist	James Stewart	0.25%	61	64.08	66.8	67.16				
Electorate: 24,757 Valid: 12,279 (49.60%) Spoilt: 506 Quota: 1,755 Turnout: 12,785 (51.64%)

=== Upper Falls ===
1985: 2 x Sinn Féin, 2 x SDLP, 1 x Alliance

Upper Falls - 5 seats
Party	Candidate	FPv%	Count								
Party	Candidate	FPv%	1	2	3	4	5	6	7	8	9
SDLP	Alex Attwood	19.35%	2,461								
Sinn Féin	Alex Maskey	18.30%	2,329								
Sinn Féin	Teresa Holland	17.73%	2,256								
SDLP	Cormac Boomer*	13.01%	1,655	1,890.43	1,897.72	1,900.42	1,903.42	1,958.24	2,028.22	2,161.22	
Alliance	Pip Glendinning	7.32%	931	947.38	949.9	951.16	955.16	958.73	994.31	1,334.43	1,805.43
Sinn Féin	Mairtin O'Muilleoir	8.01%	1,031	1,034.25	1,214.16	1,334.58	1,339.82	1,410.1	1,440.06	1,461.64	1,561.64
SDLP	Mary Muldoon*	6.28%	799	834.36	840.84	843.36	850.36	903.78	940.23	1,035.15	
Workers' Party	Gerald McCann	3.03%	386	389.77	390.67	391.63	405.76	413.51	463.37		
DUP	Irene Lewis	2.92%	372	372.39	372.39	372.51	372.6	372.6	374.6		
Labour and Trade Union	Michael Duffy	1.87%	238	243.2	244.82	246.14	255.14	273.81			
People's Democracy	John McAnulty*	1.03%	131	131.91	137.67	140.73	146				
SDLP	Peter Prendiville	0.57%	72	87.86	88.04	88.28	90.5				
Communist	Kevin McCorry	0.47%	60	60.39	61.11	61.17					
Electorate: 23,327 Valid: 12,721 (54.53%) Spoilt: 331 Quota: 2,121 Turnout: 13,052 (55.95%)

=== Victoria ===
1985: 3 x UUP, 2 x DUP, 2 x Alliance

Victoria - 7 seats
Party	Candidate	FPv%	Count						
Party	Candidate	FPv%	1	2	3	4	5	6	7
DUP	Wallace Browne	22.22%	3,447						
UUP	Thomas Patton*	15.41%	2,390						
Alliance	Oliver Napier*	14.89%	2,309						
UUP	William Corry*	11.85%	1,838	1,985.4					
UUP	Dorothy Dunlop	8.80%	1,365	1,425.28	1,595.14	1,596.58	1,619.62	2,282.62	
Alliance	George Thompson	8.23%	1,278	1,289.88	1,312.68	1,457.68	1,775.92	1,844.14	1,918.01
DUP	Robin Newton	3.64%	564	1,611.64	1,636.15	1,640.03	1,644.03	1,772.26	1,910.87
DUP	Samuel Walker	7.29%	1,131	1,330.76	1,400.49	1,401.68	1,408.72	1,579.34	1,708.82
UUP	John McCrea	6.46%	1,002	1,033.68	1,175.61	1,176.61	1,186.53		
SDLP	Barry Gilheany	1.21%	188	189.76	190.33				
Electorate: 30,776 Valid: 15,512 (50.40%) Spoilt: 427 Quota: 1,940 Turnout: 15,939 (51.79%)
