= 2011 Belfast City Council election =

2011 Northern Irish local government election

- 5 May 2011

All 51 seats to Belfast City Council 26 seats needed for a majority
| | First party | Second party | Third party |
|---|---|---|---|
| Party | Sinn Féin | DUP | SDLP |
| Seats won | 16 | 15 | 8 |
| Seat change | ▲2 | 0 | 0 |
| | Fourth party | Fifth party | Sixth party |
| Party | Alliance | UUP | PUP |
| Seats won | 6 | 3 | 2 |
| Seat change | ▲2 | ▼4 | 0 |
| | Seventh party |
| Party | Independent |
| Seats won | 1 |
| Seat change | 0 |
- 2011 Belfast City Council Election Results, shaded by First Preference Votes.
Lord Mayor before election
Pat Convery
SDLP
Lord Mayor
Niall Ó Donnghaile
Sinn Féin

Elections to Belfast City Council were held on 5 May 2011 on the same day as the other Northern Irish local government elections. The election used nine district electoral areas to elect a total of 51 councillors, most representing the more heavily populated north and west.

Sinn Féin emerged as the largest party, and Niall Ó Donnghaile became Lord Mayor.

== Election results ==
Belfast local election result 2011
| Party | Seats | Gains | Losses | Net gain/loss | Seats % | Votes % | Votes | +/− |
|---|---|---|---|---|---|---|---|---|
| Sinn Féin | 16 | 3 | 1 | ▲2 | 31.4 | 30.9 | 28,234 | ▲0.1 |
| DUP | 15 | 1 | 1 | 0 | 29.4 | 23.4 | 21,353 | ▼2.3 |
| SDLP | 8 | 1 | 1 | 0 | 15.7 | 13.8 | 12,547 | ▼3.3 |
| Alliance | 6 | 2 | 0 | ▲2 | 11.8 | 12.6 | 11,540 | ▲5.8 |
| UUP | 3 | 0 | 4 | ▼4 | 5.9 | 8.6 | 7,836 | ▼5.2 |
| PUP | 2 | 0 | 0 | 0 | 3.9 | 2.8 | 2,570 | ▲0.1 |
| Independent | 1 | 0 | 0 | 0 | 2.0 | 1.4 | 1,283 | ▲0.4 |
| Éirígí | 0 | 0 | 0 | 0 | 0.0 | 2.3 | 2,062 | New |
| Green (NI) | 0 | 0 | 0 | 0 | 0.0 | 1.4 | 1,320 | ▲0.6 |
| Workers' Party | 0 | 0 | 0 | 0 | 0.0 | 0.8 | 760 | ▲0.1 |
| Irish Republican Socialist | 0 | 0 | 0 | 0 | 0.0 | 0.6 | 588 | ▲0.6 |
| Socialist Party | 0 | 0 | 0 | 0 | 0.0 | 0.5 | 434 | ▲0.1 |
| People Before Profit | 0 | 0 | 0 | 0 | 0.0 | 0.4 | 321 | New |
| TUV | 0 | 0 | 0 | 0 | 0.0 | 0.4 | 349 | New |
| NI Conservatives | 0 | 0 | 0 | 0 | 0.0 | 0.1 | 103 | ▼0.1 |

Note: "Votes" are the first preference votes.

== Districts summary ==
Results of the Belfast City Council election, 2011 by district
| Ward | % | Cllrs | % | Cllrs | % | Cllrs | % | Cllrs | % | Cllrs | % | Cllrs | % | Cllrs | Total Cllrs |
| Ward | Sinn Féin | | DUP | | SDLP | | Alliance | | UUP | | PUP | | Others | | Total Cllrs |
|---|---|---|---|---|---|---|---|---|---|---|---|---|---|---|---|
| Balmoral | 14.7 | 1 | 19.6 | 1 | 29.0 | 2 | 17.6 | 1 | 15.1 | 1 | 0.0 | 0 | 3.9 | 0 | 6 |
| Castle | 26.6 | 2 | 30.5 | 2 | 22.4 | 1 | 6.9 | 0 | 11.8 | 1 | 0.0 | 0 | 1.7 | 0 | 6 |
| Court | 2.8 | 0 | 64.4 | 3 | 1.5 | 0 | 1.2 | 0 | 6.0 | 0 | 9.7 | 1 | 14.4 | 1 | 5 |
| Laganbank | 17.3 | 1 | 14.1 | 1 | 27.4 | 2 | 19.0 | 1 | 11.5 | 0 | 0.0 | 0 | 10.8 | 0 | 5 |
| Lower Falls | 75.4 | 4 | 0.0 | 0 | 10.2 | 1 | 0.0 | 0 | 0.0 | 0 | 0.0 | 0 | 14.4 | 0 | 5 |
| Oldpark | 53.1 | 3 | 25.4 | 2 | 11.2 | 1 | 2.9 | 0 | 5.1 | 0 | 0.0 | 0 | 5.0 | 0 | 6 |
| Pottinger | 11.3 | 1 | 36.8 | 3 | 4.8 | 0 | 19.9 | 1 | 8.3 | 0 | 10.7 | 1 | 8.1 | 0 | 6 |
| Upper Falls | 67.8 | 4 | 1.4 | 0 | 18.1 | 1 | 1.3 | 0 | 0.0 | 0 | 0.0 | 0 | 11.3 | 0 | 5 |
| Victoria | 0.0 | 0 | 32.6 | 3 | 1.5 | 0 | 36.5 | 3 | 17.9 | 1 | 6.5 | 0 | 5.1 | 0 | 7 |
| Total | 30.9 | 16 | 23.4 | 15 | 13.8 | 8 | 12.6 | 6 | 8.6 | 3 | 2.8 | 2 | 8.0 | 1 | 51 |

== District results ==
=== Balmoral ===
2005: 2 x SDLP, 2 x DUP, 1 x Alliance, 1 x UUP
2011: 2 x SDLP, 1 x DUP, 1 x Alliance, 1 x UUP, 1 x Sinn Féin
2005-2011 Change: Sinn Féin gain from DUP

Balmoral - 6 seats
| Party | Candidate | FPv% | Count | | | | | | | | |
| Party | Candidate | FPv% | 1 | 2 | 3 | 4 | 5 | 6 | 7 | 8 | 9 |
|---|---|---|---|---|---|---|---|---|---|---|---|
| Alliance | Tom Ekin* | 17.70% | 1,762 | | | | | | | | |
| DUP | Ruth Patterson* | 15.60% | 1,553 | | | | | | | | |
| Sinn Féin | Máirtín Ó Muilleoir | 14.71% | 1,465 | | | | | | | | |
| SDLP | Claire Hanna | 14.49% | 1,443 | | | | | | | | |
| UUP | Bob Stoker* | 9.26% | 922 | 961.27 | 961.69 | 972.57 | 997.17 | 1,296.56 | 1,296.74 | 1,789.74 | |
| SDLP | Bernie Kelly* | 7.09% | 706 | 793.78 | 816.51 | 817.63 | 916.95 | 927.52 | 945.04 | 1,005.25 | 1,099.65 |
| SDLP | Niall Kelly | 7.46% | 743 | 767.15 | 782.57 | 783.13 | 831.22 | 836.25 | 852.18 | 874.21 | 903.21 |
| UUP | Jim Kirkpatrick* | 5.80% | 578 | 655.91 | 660.75 | 665.71 | 693.72 | 817.05 | 817.14 | | |
| DUP | Sharon Simpson | 3.98% | 396 | 412.38 | 415.8 | 516.92 | 541.93 | | | | |
| Green (NI) | Mark Simpson | 2.83% | 282 | 349.41 | 400.34 | 403.3 | | | | | |
| People Before Profit | Andrew King | 1.07% | 107 | 120.86 | | | | | | | |
Electorate: 18,752 Valid: 9,957 (53.10%) Spoilt: 139 Quota: 1,423 Turnout: 10,096 (53.84%)

=== Castle ===
2005: 2 x DUP, 2 x SDLP, 1 x Sinn Féin, 1 x UUP
2011: 2 x DUP, 2 x Sinn Féin, 1 x SDLP, 1 x UUP
2005-2011 Change: Sinn Féin gain from SDLP

Castle - 6 seats
| Party | Candidate | FPv% | Count | | | | | |
| Party | Candidate | FPv% | 1 | 2 | 3 | 4 | 5 | 6 |
|---|---|---|---|---|---|---|---|---|
| DUP | Lydia Patterson | 14.85% | 1,489 | | | | | |
| DUP | Guy Spence | 9.44% | 946 | 949 | 1,529 | | | |
| Sinn Féin | Tierna Cunningham* | 13.74% | 1,377 | 1,404 | 1,404 | 1,433 | | |
| SDLP | Patrick Convery* | 13.64% | 1,367 | 1,399 | 1,404 | 1,606 | | |
| Sinn Féin | Mary Ellen Campbell | 12.90% | 1,293 | 1,310 | 1,310 | 1,326 | 1,335 | 1,335 |
| UUP | David Browne* | 11.78% | 1,181 | 1,185 | 1,211 | 1,332 | 1,345 | 1,440.04 |
| SDLP | Cathal Mullaghan* | 8.81% | 883 | 903 | 904 | 1,120 | 1,255 | 1,255.64 |
| Alliance | David McKechnie | 6.87% | 689 | 726 | 732 | | | |
| DUP | Lee Reynolds | 6.27% | 629 | 632 | | | | |
| Workers' Party | John Lavery | 1.70% | 170 | | | | | |
Electorate: 19,494 Valid: 10,024 (51.42%) Spoilt: 223 Quota: 1,433 Turnout: 10,247 (52.56%)

=== Court ===
2005: 3 x DUP, 1 x PUP, 1 x Independent
2011: 3 x DUP, 1 x PUP, 1 x Independent
2005-2011 Change: No change

Court - 5 seats
| Party | Candidate | FPv% | Count | | | | |
| Party | Candidate | FPv% | 1 | 2 | 3 | 4 | 5 |
|---|---|---|---|---|---|---|---|
| DUP | William Humphrey* | 40.05% | 2,643 | | | | |
| DUP | Brian Kingston | 20.77% | 1,371 | | | | |
| DUP | Naomi Thompson | 3.59% | 237 | 1,153.8 | | | |
| Independent | Frank McCoubrey* | 11.42% | 754 | 937.6 | 1,006.48 | 1,015.36 | 1,131.36 |
| PUP | Hugh Smyth* | 9.70% | 640 | 782.2 | 846.04 | 862.36 | 939.38 |
| UUP | Bobby McConnell | 5.98% | 395 | 585.2 | 698.32 | 717.88 | 805.64 |
| Independent | Raymond McCord | 3.02% | 199 | 263.8 | 281.72 | 285.98 | |
| Sinn Féin | Karol McKee | 2.79% | 184 | 184.6 | 184.6 | 184.6 | |
| Alliance | Mark Long | 1.18% | 78 | 103.8 | 108.56 | 109.76 | |
| SDLP | Conor McNeill | 1.50% | 99 | 101.4 | 102.24 | 102.54 | |
Electorate: 13,455 Valid: 6,600 (49.05%) Spoilt: 170 Quota: 1,101 Turnout: 6,770 (50.32%)

=== Laganbank ===
2005: 2 x SDLP, 1 x Sinn Féin, 1 x DUP, 1 x UUP
2011: 2 x SDLP, 1 x Sinn Féin, 1 x DUP, 1 x Alliance
2005-2011 Change: Alliance gain from UUP

Laganbank - 5 seats
| Party | Candidate | FPv% | Count | | | |
| Party | Candidate | FPv% | 1 | 2 | 3 | 4 |
|---|---|---|---|---|---|---|
| Alliance | Catherine Curran | 18.95% | 1,518 | | | |
| Sinn Féin | Deirdre Hargey | 17.27% | 1,383 | | | |
| SDLP | Patrick McCarthy* | 16.99% | 1,361 | | | |
| DUP | Christopher Stalford* | 14.06% | 1,126 | 1,138.35 | 1,148.26 | 1,168.34 |
| SDLP | Kate Mullan | 10.40% | 833 | 893.06 | 978.44 | 1,281.83 |
| UUP | Michelle Bostock | 11.50% | 921 | 952.46 | 959.11 | 1,013.43 |
| Green (NI) | Clare Bailey | 6.24% | 500 | 557.59 | 727.74 | |
| People Before Profit | Mark Hewitt | 1.80% | 144 | 152.19 | | |
| Socialist Party | Paddy Meehan | 1.70% | 136 | 139.25 | | |
| Workers' Party | Paddy Lynn | 1.10% | 88 | 91.9 | | |
Electorate: 16,314 Valid: 8,010 (49.10%) Spoilt: 171 Quota: 1,336 Turnout: 8,181 (50.15%)

=== Lower Falls ===
2005: 5 x Sinn Féin
2011: 4 x Sinn Féin, 1 x SDLP
2005-2011 Change: SDLP gain from Sinn Féin

Lower Falls - 5 seats
| Party | Candidate | FPv% | Count | | | | |
| Party | Candidate | FPv% | 1 | 2 | 3 | 4 | 5 |
|---|---|---|---|---|---|---|---|
| Sinn Féin | Janice Austin* | 19.66% | 1,920 | | | | |
| Sinn Féin | Steven Corr | 16.10% | 1,572 | 1,583.85 | 1,603.85 | 1,618 | 1,677 |
| Sinn Féin | Tom Hartley* | 15.99% | 1,561 | 1,566.1 | 1,581.1 | 1,602.25 | 1,666.25 |
| Sinn Féin | Jim McVeigh | 15.33% | 1,497 | 1,499.7 | 1,531 | 1,544.15 | 1,600.45 |
| SDLP | Colin Keenan | 10.24% | 1,000 | 1,003.15 | 1,058.15 | 1,214.15 | 1,326.15 |
| Sinn Féin | Breige Brownlee | 8.33% | 813 | 1,070.7 | 1,109 | 1,123 | 1,188.3 |
| Éirígí | John McCusker | 6.63% | 647 | 647.6 | 723.6 | 748.6 | |
| Workers' Party | John Lowry | 4.08% | 398 | 398.45 | 430.45 | | |
| Irish Republican Socialist | Jim Gorman | 2.14% | 209 | 209.75 | | | |
| Socialist Party | Pat Lawlor | 1.52% | 148 | 148.5 | | | |
Electorate: 17,238 Valid: 9,765 (56.65%) Spoilt: 305 Quota: 1,628 Turnout: 10,070 (58.42%)

=== Oldpark ===
2005: 3 x Sinn Féin, 1 x DUP, 1 x SDLP, 1 x UUP
2011: 3 x Sinn Féin, 2 x DUP, 1 x SDLP
2005-2011 Change: DUP gain from UUP

Oldpark - 6 seats
| Party | Candidate | FPv% | Count | | | | |
| Party | Candidate | FPv% | 1 | 2 | 3 | 4 | 5 |
|---|---|---|---|---|---|---|---|
| DUP | Ian Crozier* | 16.31% | 1,770 | | | | |
| Sinn Féin | Conor Maskey | 14.49% | 1,573 | | | | |
| DUP | Gareth McKee | 8.45% | 917 | 1,108.04 | 1,115.52 | 1,150.84 | 1,570.84 |
| Sinn Féin | Gerard McCabe | 13.75% | 1,492 | 1,492 | 1,510 | 1,514 | 1,568 |
| Sinn Féin | Danny Lavery* | 12.62% | 1,370 | 1,370.48 | 1,382.48 | 1,391.48 | 1,459.6 |
| SDLP | Nichola Mallon | 10.91% | 1,184 | 1,185.56 | 1,217.68 | 1,334.68 | 1,430.48 |
| Sinn Féin | Mary Clarke | 10.87% | 1,180 | 1,180.12 | 1,189.12 | 1,203.12 | 1,255.12 |
| UUP | Fred Rodgers | 4.98% | 540 | 551.76 | 556.76 | 613.12 | |
| Irish Republican Socialist | Paul Little | 3.49% | 379 | 379.24 | 398.24 | 406.24 | |
| Alliance | James McClure | 2.79% | 303 | 305.16 | 319.28 | | |
| Independent | Martin McAuley | 1.35% | 146 | 146.84 | | | |
Electorate: 22,408 Valid: 10,854 (48.44%) Spoilt: 405 Quota: 1,551 Turnout: 11,259 (50.25%)

=== Pottinger ===
2005: 3 x DUP, 1 x UUP, 1 x PUP, 1 x Alliance
2011: 3 x DUP, 1 x Alliance, 1 x Sinn Féin, 1 x PUP
2005-2011 Change: Sinn Féin gain from UUP

Pottinger - 6 seats
| Party | Candidate | FPv% | Count | | | | | | | | |
| Party | Candidate | FPv% | 1 | 2 | 3 | 4 | 5 | 6 | 7 | 8 | 9 |
|---|---|---|---|---|---|---|---|---|---|---|---|
| Alliance | Máire Hendron* | 19.89% | 1,895 | | | | | | | | |
| DUP | Gavin Robinson | 15.99% | 1,523 | | | | | | | | |
| Sinn Féin | Niall Ó Donnghaile | 11.31% | 1,077 | 1,085.96 | 1,086.91 | 1,086.91 | 1,091.15 | 1,117.43 | 1,128.07 | 1,155.55 | 1,373.55 |
| PUP | John Kyle | 10.73% | 1,022 | 1,084.72 | 1,091.76 | 1,101.04 | 1,109.04 | 1,112.36 | 1,176.89 | 1,210.81 | 1,257.85 |
| DUP | May Campbell* | 11.03% | 1,051 | 1,085.24 | 1,110.76 | 1,117.19 | 1,120.05 | 1,121.05 | 1,167.41 | 1,196.81 | 1,206.01 |
| DUP | Adam Newton | 9.83% | 936 | 971.84 | 1,082.61 | 1,083.72 | 1,086.79 | 1,086.79 | 1,109.97 | 1,129.71 | 1,138.63 |
| UUP | Philip Robinson | 8.25% | 786 | 871.76 | 884.74 | 890.13 | 894.09 | 896.41 | 964.04 | 1,007.9 | 1,048.01 |
| SDLP | Séamas De Faoite | 4.79% | 456 | 553.92 | 554.03 | 555.35 | 561.59 | 588.19 | 615.15 | 705.91 | |
| Green (NI) | David Newman | 2.34% | 223 | 353.88 | 355.31 | 360.23 | 394.11 | 413.99 | 480.99 | | |
| TUV | John Hiddleston | 2.01% | 191 | 199.64 | 200.52 | 206.84 | 209.16 | 210.48 | | | |
| Socialist Party | Tommy Black | 1.57% | 150 | 163.12 | 163.67 | 165.07 | 177.67 | 190.27 | | | |
| Workers' Party | Kevin McNally | 1.09% | 104 | 111.68 | 111.79 | 115.43 | 125.31 | | | | |
| People Before Profit | Donna Marie McCusker | 0.73% | 70 | 92.4 | 92.73 | 95.01 | | | | | |
| Independent | Karl Hedley | 0.35% | 33 | 42.28 | 42.83 | | | | | | |
| Independent | Samuel Smyth | 0.09% | 9 | 10.6 | 10.93 | | | | | | |
Electorate: 19,929 Valid: 9,526 (47.80%) Spoilt: 190 Quota: 1,361 Turnout: 9,716 (48.75%)

=== Upper Falls ===
2005: 4 x Sinn Féin, 1 x SDLP
2011: 4 x Sinn Féin, 1 x SDLP
2005-2011 Change: No change

Upper Falls - 5 seats
| Party | Candidate | FPv% | Count | | |
| Party | Candidate | FPv% | 1 | 2 | 3 |
|---|---|---|---|---|---|
| Sinn Féin | Matt Garrett | 18.00% | 2,250 | | |
| Sinn Féin | Gerard O'Neill* | 17.47% | 2,184 | | |
| Sinn Féin | Emma Groves | 17.07% | 2,133 | | |
| SDLP | Tim Attwood* | 16.12% | 2,015 | 2,356 | |
| Sinn Féin | Caoimhín Mac Giolla Mhín | 15.28% | 1,910 | 1,952 | 2,009 |
| Éirígí | Pádraic Mac Coitir | 11.32% | 1,415 | 1,428 | 1,474 |
| SDLP | Helen Walsh | 2.00% | 250 | | |
| DUP | Eileen Kingston | 1.43% | 179 | | |
| Alliance | Dan McGuinness | 1.30% | 162 | | |
Electorate: 20,530 Valid: 12,498 (60.88%) Spoilt: 298 Quota: 2,084 Turnout: 12,796 (62.33%)

=== Victoria ===
2005: 3 x DUP, 2 x UUP, 2 x Alliance
2011: 3 x Alliance, 3 x DUP, 1 x UUP
2005-2011 Change: Alliance gain from UUP

Victoria - 7 seats
| Party | Candidate | FPv% | Count | | | | | | | | | |
| Party | Candidate | FPv% | 1 | 2 | 3 | 4 | 5 | 6 | 7 | 8 | 9 | 10 |
|---|---|---|---|---|---|---|---|---|---|---|---|---|
| DUP | Robin Newton* | 16.62% | 2,338 | | | | | | | | | |
| Alliance | Mervyn Jones* | 16.49% | 2,319 | | | | | | | | | |
| Alliance | Laura McNamee | 11.92% | 1,677 | 1,686.5 | 2,049.14 | | | | | | | |
| Alliance | Andrew Webb | 8.08% | 1,137 | 1,143 | 1,293.48 | 1,541.24 | 1,552.24 | 1,592.1 | 1,604.1 | 1,895.1 | | |
| UUP | Jim Rodgers* | 9.63% | 1,355 | 1,401.5 | 1,407.98 | 1,418.81 | 1,437.81 | 1,451.62 | 1,488.87 | 1,639.24 | 1,657.24 | 1,816.24 |
| DUP | Tom Haire | 10.22% | 1,437 | 1,555.5 | 1,558.62 | 1,562.04 | 1,565.04 | 1,568.53 | 1,584.97 | 1,617.21 | 1,622.21 | 1,759.21 |
| DUP | John Hussey | 5.77% | 812 | 1,149 | 1,151.64 | 1,154.11 | 1,158.11 | 1,166.36 | 1,184.86 | 1,210.54 | 1,217.54 | 1,476.12 |
| UUP | Ian Adamson* | 6.70% | 942 | 955.25 | 962.69 | 967.25 | 989.5 | 1,003.69 | 1,028.19 | 1,112.99 | 1,131.9 | 1,228.49 |
| PUP | Robert McCartney | 6.46% | 908 | 926.75 | 930.59 | 932.68 | 938.68 | 946.87 | 963.37 | 1,005.54 | 1,028.54 | |
| Green (NI) | Ross Campbell | 2.24% | 315 | 317.25 | 322.53 | 325.95 | 334.14 | 353.14 | 359.14 | | | |
| UUP | Stephen Warke | 1.54% | 216 | 222.5 | 224.42 | 226.32 | 232.51 | 237.51 | 246.51 | | | |
| SDLP | Magdalena Wolska | 1.47% | 207 | 207.5 | 211.58 | 215.76 | 217.76 | 222 | 223 | | | |
| TUV | Sammy Morrison | 1.12% | 158 | 160.25 | 160.25 | 161.01 | 162.01 | 175.01 | | | | |
| Independent | Roy Hobson | 1.01% | 142 | 143.75 | 145.43 | 147.14 | 158.39 | | | | | |
| NI Conservatives | Garry Crosbie | 0.73% | 103 | 103.5 | 103.5 | 104.07 | | | | | | |
Electorate: 25,814 Valid: 14,066 (54.49%) Spoilt: 280 Quota: 1,759 Turnout: 14,346 (55.57%)
