= Herbert Ditty (politician) =

(died 1998) former Ulster loyalist politician and lord mayor of Belfast

Lord Mayor of Belfast
- In office June 1992 – June 1993
- Deputy: Frank Millar
- Preceded by: Nigel Dodds
- Succeeded by: Reg Empey

Deputy Lord Mayor of Belfast
- In office June 1991 – June 1992
- Preceded by: Eric Smyth
- Succeeded by: Frank Millar

High Sheriff of Belfast
- In office January 1985 – January 1986
- Preceded by: Andrew Cairns
- Succeeded by: Jim Kirkpatrick (1990)

Member of Belfast City Council
- In office 15 May 1985 – 19 May 1993
- Preceded by: New district
- Succeeded by: Christopher McGimpsey
- Constituency: Court
- In office 30 May 1973 – 20 May 1981
- Preceded by: New district
- Succeeded by: Joseph Coggle
- Constituency: Belfast Area G

Personal details
- Born: Belfast, Northern Ireland
- Died: 1998
- Party: Ulster Unionist Party
- Other political affiliations: Ulster Protestant Action (1956-1966)

Herbert Ditty (died 1998) was a Northern Irish Ulster loyalist politician and activist who served as Lord Mayor of Belfast from June 1992 to 1993, having previously been deputy lord mayor from 1991 to 1992. A member of the Ulster Unionist Party (UUP), he was a Belfast City Councillor from 1973 to 1981, then 1985 until 1993.

== Background ==
Ditty was first elected onto Belfast City Council at the 1973 local elections, representing the Belfast Area G District. He was later unseated by the Democratic Unionist Party's Joe Coggle in the 1981 local elections.

Ditty returned to the council in 1985, this time for the successor Court District.

In June 1992, Ditty was appointed Lord Mayor of Belfast. He lost his council seat at the May 1993 local elections, while still serving as lord mayor.
