= Balmoral (District Electoral Area) =

Electoral division of Belfast, Northern Ireland

Coordinates: 54.567°N 5.967°W

- Belfast City Council DEA constituency
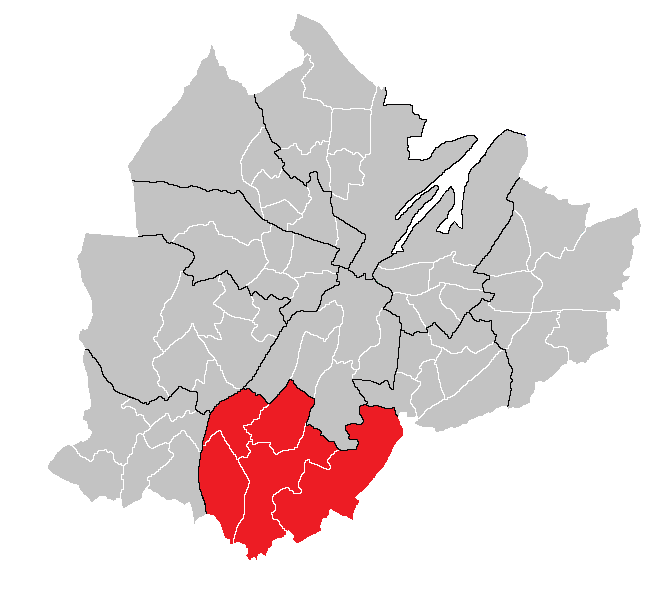
- Balmoral DEA marked on a map of Belfast City Council and its wards

Current constituency
- Created: 1985
- Seats: 5 (1985-1993); 6 (1993–2014); 5 (2014–)
- Councillors: Natasha Brennan (SF); Tara Brooks (APNI); Sarah Louise Bunting (DUP); Donal Lyons (SDLP); Micky Murray (APNI)

Balmoral DEA (1993-2014) within Belfast

Balmoral (from the Irish: Baile Mhoireil) is the most southern of ten district electoral areas (DEA) in Belfast, Northern Ireland. The district elects five members to Belfast City Council and contains the wards of Belvoir; Finaghy; Malone; Musgrave; Windsor; and Upper Malone. Balmoral, along with neighbouring Botanic, forms the greater part of the Belfast South constituencies for the Northern Ireland Assembly and UK Parliament.

The district is bounded to the west and south west by the M1 Motorway, to east and south east by the River Lagan, to the east and north east by the Malone Road and to the north by Belfast City Hospital, Queen's University Belfast and Royal Victoria Hospital.

The Lisburn Road is the main arterial route through the centre of the district, which also contains a number of public facilities including: the King's Hall conference and exhibition centre, the Musgrave Park Hospital, Sir Thomas and Lady Dixon Park and Windsor Park, the home ground of the Northern Ireland national football team. It is served by the Adelaide, Balmoral and Finaghy railway stations.

== History ==
The DEA was created for the 1985 local elections, where it contained five wards. Four of the wards came from the abolished Belfast Area C, which it effectively replaced, with the final ward, Blackstaff, coming from Belfast Area F. From the 1993 local elections to the 2011 elections, the area contained six wards, following the creation of the Musgrave ward. For the 2014 local elections, it lost the wards of Blackstaff and Windsor and gained the Belvoir ward, which had previously been part of the abolished Castlereagh Borough Council. This was as a result of the 2014 Local Government Reform.

== Wards (1985–2011) ==
Map	Ward	Population (2011 Census)	Catholic	Protestant	Other	No Religion	Area	Density	NI Assembly	UK Parliament	Ref
1	Blackstaff	3,998	15%	71.5%	1.8%	11.7%	1.92 km^{2}	2,082/km^{2}	Belfast South	Belfast South	
2	Finaghy	4,555	49.2%	42.6%	2.6%	5.6%	2.59 km^{2}	1,759/km^{2}	Belfast South	Belfast South	
3	Malone	5,555	61.2%	30.3%	2.3%	6.3%	2.18 km^{2}	2,548/km^{2}	Belfast South	Belfast South	
4	Musgrave	4,927	60.6%	32.9%	1.7%	4.8%	1.78 km^{2}	2,768/km^{2}	Belfast South	Belfast South	
5	Upper Malone	4,841	29.4%	60.1%	2.5%	8.1%	4.32 km^{2}	1,121/km^{2}	Belfast South	Belfast South	
6	Windsor	8,141	41.6%	40.7%	5.8%	11.8%	0.92 km^{2}	8,849/km^{2}	Belfast South	Belfast South	
Balmoral		32,017	43.8%	44.8%	3.1%	8.3%	13.71 km^{2}	2,335/km^{2}			

== Councillors ==
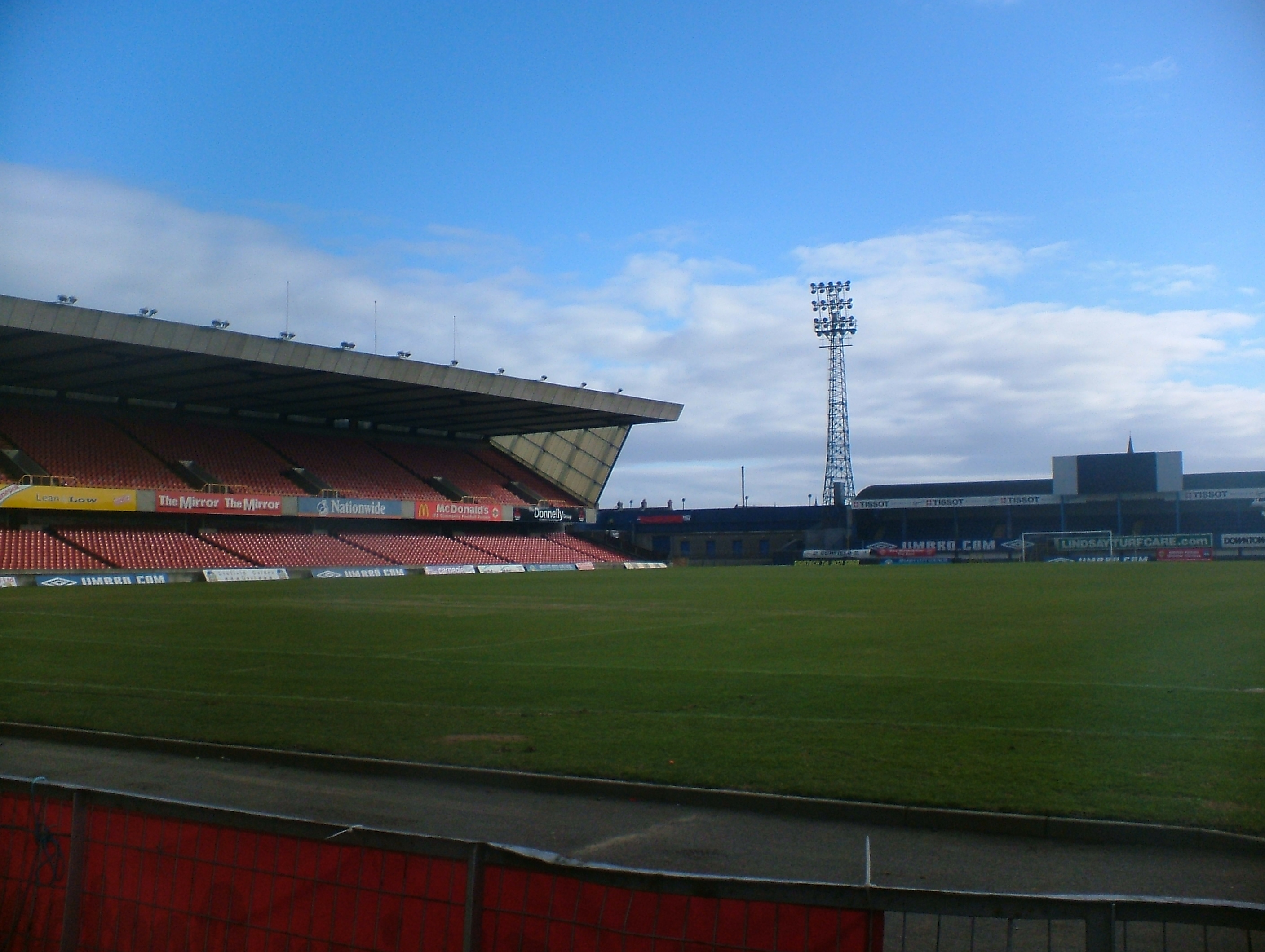
Windsor Park is the home of the Northern Ireland football team.

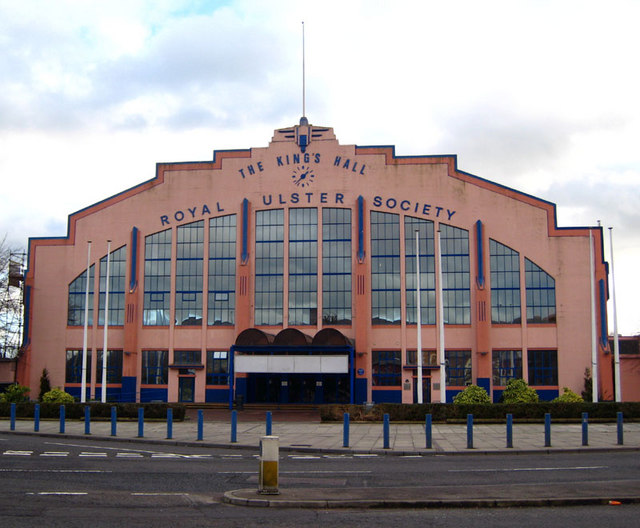
The King's Hall is a multi-purpose venue located in Balmoral.

Election	Councillor (Party)	Councillor (Party)	Councillor (Party)	Councillor (Party)	Councillor (Party)	Councillor (Party)
August 2024 Co-Option	Sarah Bunting (DUP)	Tara Brooks (Alliance)	Micky Murray (Alliance)	Natasha Brennan (Sinn Féin)	Dónal Lyons (SDLP)	5 seats 2014-present
2023	Sarah Bunting (DUP)	Tara Brooks (Alliance)	Micky Murray (Alliance)	Geraldine McAteer (Sinn Féin)	Dónal Lyons (SDLP)	5 seats 2014-present
May 2022 Co-Option	Sarah Bunting (DUP)	Gareth Spratt (DUP)	Micky Murray (Alliance)	Geraldine McAteer (Sinn Féin)	Dónal Lyons (SDLP)	5 seats 2014-present
May 2020 Co-Option	Sarah Bunting (DUP)	Gareth Spratt (DUP)	Kate Nicholl (Alliance)	Geraldine McAteer (Sinn Féin)	Dónal Lyons (SDLP)	5 seats 2014-present
2019	Sarah Bunting (DUP)	David Graham (DUP)	Kate Nicholl (Alliance)	Geraldine McAteer (Sinn Féin)	Dónal Lyons (SDLP)	5 seats 2014-present
May/June 2016 Co-Options	Lee Reynolds (DUP)	Jeff Dudgeon (UUP)	Kate Nicholl (Alliance)	Geraldine McAteer (Sinn Féin)	Dónal Lyons (SDLP)	5 seats 2014-present
July 2015 Co-Option	Christopher Stalford (DUP)	Jeff Dudgeon (UUP)	Paula Bradshaw (Alliance)	Geraldine McAteer (Sinn Féin)	Dónal Lyons (SDLP)	5 seats 2014-present
October 2014 Co-Option	Christopher Stalford (DUP)	Jeff Dudgeon (UUP)	Paula Bradshaw (Alliance)	Geraldine McAteer (Sinn Féin)	Claire Hanna (SDLP)	5 seats 2014-present
2014	Christopher Stalford (DUP)	Jeff Dudgeon (UUP)	Paula Bradshaw (Alliance)	Máirtín Ó Muilleoir (Sinn Féin)	Claire Hanna (SDLP)	5 seats 2014-present
2011	Ruth Patterson (DUP)	Bob Stoker (UUP)	Tom Ekin (Alliance)	Máirtín Ó Muilleoir (Sinn Féin)	Claire Hanna (SDLP)	Bernie Kelly (SDLP)
2005	Ruth Patterson (DUP)	Bob Stoker (UUP)	Tom Ekin (Alliance)	Jim Kirkpatrick (DUP)	Carmel Hanna (SDLP)	Bernie Kelly (SDLP)
2001	Ruth Patterson (DUP)	Bob Stoker (UUP)	Tom Ekin (Alliance)	Mary Crooks (UUP)	Carmel Hanna (SDLP)	Catherine Molloy (SDLP)
1997	Harry Smith (DUP)	Bob Stoker (UUP)	Tom Ekin (Alliance)	Mary Crooks (UUP)	Carmel Hanna (SDLP)	Catherine Molloy (SDLP)
1993	Harry Smith (DUP)	Jim Kirkpatrick (UUP)	Philip McGarry (Alliance)	Mary Crooks (UUP)	Dorita Field (SDLP)	John Parkes (DUP)
1989	5 seats 2014-present	Jim Kirkpatrick (UUP)	Mark Long (Alliance)	Mary Crooks (UUP)	Dorita Field (SDLP)	John Parkes (DUP)
1985	5 seats 2014-present	Jim Kirkpatrick (UUP)	John Montgomery (Alliance)	Mary Crooks (UUP)	William Dickson (DUP)	John Parkes (DUP)

In May 2011, Councillors Tom Ekin, Ruth Patterson and Bob Stoker were appointed as Aldermen by Belfast City Council. Alderman Ruth Patterson also served as Deputy Lord Mayor, 2011–12, while Mairtin O'Muilleoir is serving as Lord Mayor for 2013–14.

== 2023 Election ==
2019: 2 x DUP, 1 x SDLP, 1 x Alliance, 1 x Sinn Fein

2023: 2 x Alliance, 1 x DUP, 1 x SDLP, 1 x Sinn Féin

2019–2023 Change: Alliance gain from DUP

Balmoral - 5 seats
Party	Candidate	FPv%	Count						
Party	Candidate	FPv%	1	2	3	4	5	6	7
Sinn Féin	Geraldine McAteer* †	19.91%	2,037						
SDLP	Donal Lyons*	15.80%	1,616	1,641.28	1,894.28				
Alliance	Tara Brooks	14.88%	1,522	1,530.64	1,555.28	1,729.28			
DUP	Sarah Bunting*	14.79%	1,513	1,513.32	1,514.32	1,523.32	1,524.98	1,722.98	
Alliance	Micky Murray*	10.66%	1,090	1,096.72	1,121.16	1,197.16	1,324.15	1,501.12	1,788.12
DUP	Gareth Spratt*	7.99%	817	817	818	825	825	940	941
Sinn Féin	Seán Napier	4.17%	427	699.80	716.72	755	806.46	809.46	
UUP	Joshua Lowry	5.39%	551	551.16	554.16	567.16	574.63		
Green (NI)	Lauren Kendall	3.26%	333	334.60	340.08				
SDLP	Sarah Mulgrew	3.16%	323	332.12					
Electorate: 18,691 Valid: 10,229 (54.73%) Spoilt: 147 Quota: 1,705 Turnout: 10,376 (55.51%)

== 2019 Election ==
2014: 1 x DUP, 1 x SDLP, 1 x Alliance, 1 x Sinn Fein, 1 x UUP

2019: 2 x DUP, 1 x SDLP, 1 x Alliance, 1 x Sinn Fein

2014-2019 Change: DUP gain from UUP

Balmoral - 5 seats
Party	Candidate	FPv%	Count					
Party	Candidate	FPv%	1	2	3	4	5	6
Alliance	Kate Nicholl* †	20.00%	1,842					
DUP	David Graham †	15.62%	1,442	1,447.44	1,494.44	1,705.44		
SDLP	Dónal Lyons*	14.18%	1,306	1,374.51	1,396.55	1,461.75	1,469.94	1,608.94
DUP	Sarah Bunting	11.12%	1,025	1,029.08	1,056.25	1,285.35	1,432.77	1,478.69
Sinn Féin	Geraldine McAteer*	13.93%	1,283	1,291.16	1,311.16	1,313.33	1,313.33	1,421.98
SDLP	Michael Mulhern	8.82%	813	863.15	896.55	930.31	934.86	1,233.18
Green (NI)	Caoimhe O'Connell	5.47%	504	616.37	752.02	862.6	870.79	
UUP	Jeffrey Dudgeon*	7.16%	660	696.71	745.74			
People Before Profit	Pádraigín Mervyn	2.19%	202	215.94				
UKIP	William Traynor	1.44%	133	134.53				
Electorate: 17,864 Valid: 9,210 (51.56%) Spoilt: 116 Quota: 1,536 Turnout: 9,326 (52.21%)

== 2014 Election ==
This election was carried out under new ward boundaries, as a result of local government reform.

2011: 2 x SDLP, 1 x DUP, 1 x Alliance, 1 x UUP, 1 x Sinn Féin

2014: 1 x DUP, 1 x SDLP, 1 x Alliance, 1 x Sinn Féin, 1 x UUP

2011-2014 Change: SDLP loss due to the reduction of one seat

Balmoral - 5 seats
Party	Candidate	FPv%	Count									
Party	Candidate	FPv%	1	2	3	4	5	6	7	8	9	10
Sinn Féin	Máirtín Ó Muilleoir* †	17.13%	1,525									
SDLP	Claire Hanna* †	17.12%	1,524									
Alliance	Paula Bradshaw †	9.06%	806	809.66	812.42	830.6	896.05	986.43	989.46	1,435.23	1,748.23	
DUP	Christopher Stalford* †	10.88%	968	968.36	968.52	981.54	986.54	1,000.54	1,233.58	1,234.58	1,247.47	1,256.5
UUP	Jeffrey Dudgeon	9.86%	878	878	878.2	908.2	917.2	955.22	1,129.22	1,141.26	1,170.51	1,191.5
DUP	Sarah Clarke	10.67%	950	950.09	950.23	956.23	957.23	966.23	1,063.23	1,069.25	1,083.16	1,090.2
SDLP	Justin Cartwright	6.62%	589	613.93	635.39	648.8	690.62	740.48	746.5	810.83		
Alliance	Jamie Doyle	4.83%	430	434.71	437.47	454.65	515.39	594.08	601.13			
PUP	Simon Rice	5.99%	533	533.03	533.11	544.11	546.11	553.14				
NI21	Tina McKenzie	2.88%	256	257.38	258.32	325.81	349.12					
Green (NI)	Elli Kontorravdis	2.52%	224	226.73	227.47	251.63						
NI21	Barbara Neeson	0.83%	74	74.6	74.8							
NI Conservatives	David Timson	0.83%	74	74.18	74.22							
Independent	Gerard Collins	0.79%	70	70.57	70.81							
Electorate: 17,107 Valid: 8,901 (52.03%) Spoilt: 131 Quota: 1,484 Turnout: 9,032 (52.80%)

== 2011 Election ==
2005: 2 x SDLP, 2 x DUP, 1 x Alliance, 1 x UUP

2011: 2 x SDLP, 1 x DUP, 1 x Alliance, 1 x UUP, 1 x Sinn Féin

2005-2011 Change: Sinn Féin gain from DUP

Balmoral - 6 seats
Party	Candidate	FPv%	Count								
Party	Candidate	FPv%	1	2	3	4	5	6	7	8	9
Alliance	Tom Ekin*	17.70%	1,762								
DUP	Ruth Patterson*	15.60%	1,553								
Sinn Féin	Máirtín Ó Muilleoir	14.71%	1,465								
SDLP	Claire Hanna	14.49%	1,443								
UUP	Bob Stoker*	9.26%	922	961.27	961.69	972.57	997.17	1,296.56	1,296.74	1,789.74	
SDLP	Bernie Kelly*	7.09%	706	793.78	816.51	817.63	916.95	927.52	945.04	1,005.25	1,099.65
SDLP	Niall Kelly	7.46%	743	767.15	782.57	783.13	831.22	836.25	852.18	874.21	903.21
UUP	Jim Kirkpatrick*	5.80%	578	655.91	660.75	665.71	693.72	817.05	817.14		
DUP	Sharon Simpson	3.98%	396	412.38	415.8	516.92	541.93				
Green (NI)	Mark Simpson	2.83%	282	349.41	400.34	403.3					
People Before Profit	Andrew King	1.07%	107	120.86							
Electorate: 18,752 Valid: 9,957 (53.10%) Spoilt: 139 Quota: 1,423 Turnout: 10,096 (53.84%)

== 2005 Election ==
2001: 2 x UUP, 2 x SDLP, 1 x Alliance, 1 x DUP

2005: 2 x SDLP, 1 x DUP, 1 x UUP, 1 x Alliance

2001-2005 Change: DUP gain from UUP

Balmoral - 6 seats
Party	Candidate	FPv%	Count								
Party	Candidate	FPv%	1	2	3	4	5	6	7	8	9
SDLP	Carmel Hanna*	17.34%	2,030								
SDLP	Bernie Kelly	7.09%	906	908	1,137.84	1,949.84					
Alliance	Tom Ekin*	12.88%	1,508	1,524	1,559.19	1,613.31	1,755.9				
UUP	Bob Stoker*	10.08%	1,180	1,288	1,291.93	1,296.74	1,300.17	1,312.42	2,163.42		
DUP	Jim Kirkpatrick	12.58%	1,473	1,484	1,485.19	1,485.19	1,487.15	1,488.13	1,642.79	1,934.39	
DUP	Ruth Patterson*	9.65%	1,130	1,180	1,180.17	1,183.51	1,183.51	1,184	1,261.66	1,452.46	1,706.11
Sinn Féin	Stiofán Long	10.26%	1,202	1,204	1,220.15	1,305.88	1,423.48	1,458.27	1,470.98	1,474.58	1,479.92
UUP	Esmond Birnie	9.61%	1,125	1,137	1,142.95	1,153.16	1,160.51	1,183.05			
SDLP	Mary Kennedy	8.05%	943	943	991.96						
Independent	Thomas Wilson	1.82%	213								
Electorate: 18,382 Valid: 11,710 (63.70%) Spoilt: 192 Quota: 1,673 Turnout: 11,902 (64.75%)

== 2001 Election ==
1997: 2 x UUP, 2 x SDLP, 1 x Alliance, 1 x DUP

2001: 2 x UUP, 2 x SDLP, 1 x Alliance, 1 x DUP

1997-2001 Change: No change

Balmoral - 6 seats
Party	Candidate	FPv%	Count			
Party	Candidate	FPv%	1	2	3	4
SDLP	Carmel Hanna*	22.60%	3,077			
UUP	Mary Crooks*	16.72%	2,276			
UUP	Bob Stoker*	14.93%	2,032			
SDLP	Catherine Molloy*	7.25%	987	1,919.77	1,945.77	
Alliance	Tom Ekin*	12.37%	1,684	1,780.57	1,935.49	2,047.4
DUP	Ruth Patterson	10.11%	1,377	1,377.74	1,779.11	1,982.6
Sinn Féin	Stephen Long	9.91%	1,349	1,435.21	1,445.58	1,446.53
DUP	Thomas Morrow	3.09%	421	425.07		
UUP	John Hiddleston	3.02%	411	415.44		
Electorate: 20,958 Valid: 13,614 (64.96%) Spoilt: 259 Quota: 1,945 Turnout: 13,873 (66.19%)

== 1997 Election ==
1993: 2 x UUP, 2 x DUP, 1 x SDLP, 1 x Alliance

1997: 2 x UUP, 2 x SDLP, 1 x Alliance, 1 x DUP

1993-1997 Change: SDLP gain from DUP

Balmoral - 6 seats
Party	Candidate	FPv%	Count									
Party	Candidate	FPv%	1	2	3	4	5	6	7	8	9	10
UUP	Mary Crooks*	20.49%	2,329									
SDLP	Carmel Hanna	16.85%	1,916									
DUP	Harry Smith*	8.13%	924	969.9	969.9	979.3	983.3	1,034.5	1,129.5	1,690.5		
UUP	Bob Stoker	8.35%	949	1,070.5	1,070.5	1,083.9	1,088.2	1,169.2	1,448.9	1,550.8	1,936.8	
SDLP	Catherine Molloy	9.21%	1,047	1,048.2	1,310.55	1,328.55	1,415.2	1,422.5	1,423.65	1,424.25	1,426.65	1,430.65
Alliance	Tom Ekin	8.54%	971	986.3	994.4	1,017	1,086.05	1,099.35	1,119.95	1,127.15	1,227.55	1,305.55
Alliance	Philip McGarry*	8.43%	958	974.2	984.55	1,004.15	1,052.35	1,074.25	1,080.85	1,087.35	1,166.25	1,203.25
UUP	Gordon Lucy	2.67%	304	688.6	688.6	719.3	723.2	763.2	848.5	908.9		
DUP	Joan Parkes	5.75%	654	712.5	712.5	719	721	779.9	804.5			
Ulster Democratic	Heather Calvert	4.57%	520	534.1	534.25	535.55	549.15	662.05				
PUP	Gordon McCrea	3.49%	397	415	415	422	433					
NI Women's Coalition	Nuala Bradley	2.08%	236	238.4	241.7	267.75						
Green (NI)	Mary Ringland	0.81%	92	95.3	95.75							
NI Conservatives	Hubert Mullan	0.62%	71	80	80.15							
Electorate: 22,826 Valid: 11,368 (49.80%) Spoilt: 245 Quota: 1,625 Turnout: 11,613 (50.88%)

== 1993 Election ==
1989: 2 x UUP, 1 x DUP, 1 x SDLP, 1 x Alliance

1993: 2 x UUP, 2 x DUP, 1 x SDLP, 1 x Alliance

1989-1993 Change: DUP gain due to the addition of one seat

Balmoral - 6 seats
Party	Candidate	FPv%	Count											
Party	Candidate	FPv%	1	2	3	4	5	6	7	8	9	10	11	12
SDLP	Dorita Field*	19.12%	2,262											
DUP	John Parkes*	17.55%	2,076											
Alliance	Philip McGarry	10.76%	1,273	1,545.43	1,547.41	1,550.68	1,572.94	1,596.07	1,633.33	1,695.77				
UUP	Mary Crooks*	13.66%	1,616	1,617.89	1,638.59	1,639.22	1,640.22	1,644.4	1,644.58	1,649.85	1,790.85			
UUP	Jim Kirkpatrick*	11.80%	1,396	1,397.35	1,411.57	1,411.75	1,412.75	1,413.75	1,417.75	1,425.2	1,553.36	1,906.36		
DUP	Harry Smith	5.89%	697	697.81	993.37	995.55	995.73	996.73	1,002.18	1,011.54	1,070.86	1,242.48	1,363.48	1,396.48
Alliance	Mark Long*	7.80%	923	1,065.02	1,066.46	1,068.46	1,078.69	1,101.01	1,149.61	1,222.54	1,298.24	1,310.14	1,325.14	1,357.14
UUP	Bob Stoker	5.17%	611	611	627.74	628.74	630.1	631.1	635.1	637.37	707.88			
NI Conservatives	Esmond Birnie	2.36%	279	279.54	280.26	304.26	304.26	307.98	311.25	318.79				
NI Conservatives	William Dickson	2.23%	264	264.81	276.33	276.51	276.51	279.51	292.78	296.05				
Green (NI)	Roderick McAlister	1.05%	124	168.28	168.82	172.82	189.38	213.13	273.59					
Independent Labour	Niall Cusack	0.96%	113	153.5	154.04	166.04	178.25	207.45						
Democratic Left	Jean Craig	0.82%	97	117.52	118.06	118.06	133.81							
Workers' Party	Shaun McKeown	0.40%	48	85.53	86.25	86.25								
NI Conservatives	Hubert Mullan	0.42%	50	50.54	51.98									
Electorate: 23,497 Valid: 11,829 (50.34%) Spoilt: 331 Quota: 1,690 Turnout: 12,160 (51.75%)

== 1989 Election ==
1985: 2 x UUP, 2 x DUP, 1 x Alliance

1989: 2 x UUP, 2 x DUP, 1 x Alliance, 1 x SDLP

1985-1989 Change: SDLP gain from DUP

Balmoral - 6 seats
Party	Candidate	FPv%	Count						
Party	Candidate	FPv%	1	2	3	4	5	6	7
UUP	Mary Crooks*	18.97%	2,163						
UUP	Jim Kirkpatrick*	15.94%	1,818	1,968.72					
DUP	John Parkes*	14.05%	1,602	1,631.76	1,997.76				
Alliance	Mark Long	9.69%	1,105	1,111	1,178.68	1,182.37	1,188.37	2,118.37	
SDLP	Dorita Field	14.35%	1,636	1,637.08	1,708.32	1,708.73	1,708.85	1,778.63	1,888.89
Ind. Unionist	William Dickson*	10.32%	1,177	1,207.84	1,418.56	1,505.89	1,558.09	1,639.9	1,743.87
Alliance	John Montgomery*	9.30%	1,061	1,067.24	1,152.32	1,157.65	1,162.09		
DUP	Caroline Bingham	5.25%	599	626					
Workers' Party	Shaun McKeown	2.14%	243	243.72					
Electorate: 23,343 Valid: 11,404 (48.85%) Spoilt: 314 Quota: 1,901 Turnout: 11,718 (50.20%)

== 1985 Election ==
1985: 2 x UUP, 2 x DUP, 1 x Alliance

Balmoral - 6 seats
Party	Candidate	FPv%	Count							
Party	Candidate	FPv%	1	2	3	4	5	6	7	8
UUP	Mary Crooks*	19.07%	2,438							
UUP	Jim Kirkpatrick	14.23%	1,820	2,014.16	2,061.12	2,137.12				
DUP	William Dickson*	12.81%	1,638	1,660.56	1,676.68	1,931.32	2,321.32			
Alliance	John Montgomery	10.37%	1,326	1,329.12	1,426.48	1,430.6	1,488.68	1,497.39	2,449.39	
DUP	John Parkes	7.80%	998	1,009.28	1,032.64	1,281.76	1,536	1,691.44	1,780.22	1,908.19
SDLP	Dorita Field	10.42%	1,332	1,332.24	1,446.24	1,448.24	1,457.24	1,457.24	1,587.04	1,772.63
Alliance	David Cook*	8.15%	1,042	1,054	1,180.48	1,191.08	1,345.04	1,367.82		
UUP	James Stewart*	8.38%	1,071	1,102.08	1,127.68	1,166.44				
DUP	Clarke Gibson	7.80%	620	633.68	646.8					
Labour Party NI	Stanley Graham	1.45%	186	187.08						
Workers' Party	Shaun McKeown	1.04%	133	133.12						
Ind. Unionist	Victor Brennan	0.99%	127	127.6						
Ind. Unionist	William Stevenson*	0.44%	56	57.44						
Electorate: 23,220 Valid: 12,787 (55.07%) Spoilt: 315 Quota: 2,132 Turnout: 13,102 (56.43%)

== See also ==
- Belfast City Council
- Electoral wards of Belfast
- Local government in Northern Ireland
- Members of Belfast City Council
