= Upper Falls (District Electoral Area) =

Electoral division in Belfast, Northern Ireland

Upper Falls District Electoral Area
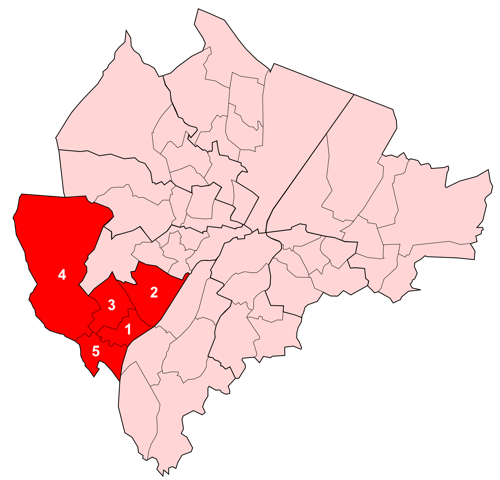
- Map showing Upper Falls wards within Belfast
- Population: (2008 Estimate)
- District: Belfast City Council
- County: County Antrim
- Country: Northern Ireland
- Sovereign state: United Kingdom
- UK Parliament: Belfast West
- NI Assembly: Belfast West

Upper Falls was one of the nine district electoral areas (DEA) which existed in Belfast, Northern Ireland from 1985 to 2014. Located in the west of the city, the district elected five members to Belfast City Council and contained the wards of Andersonstown; Falls Park; Glen Road; Glencolin; and Ladybrook. Upper Falls formed part of the Belfast West constituencies for the Northern Ireland Assembly and UK Parliament. The district, along with the neighbouring Lower Falls district, took its name from the Falls Road, one of the main arterial routes in the west of the city.

== History ==
The district was created for the 1985 local elections local elections. All five wards were part of Area D before 1985. Area D had also contained three wards which became part of the Lower Falls electoral area.

Boundary changes for the 2014 local elections created an extra ward in the area and abolished the Upper Falls DEA. Four of the six wards became part of a new Black Mountain District Electoral Area, while the remaining two formed part of a new Collin District Electoral Area, together with parts of the former Lisburn City Council.

== Wards ==
Map	Ward	Population (2011 Census)	Catholic	Protestant	Other	No Religion	Area	Density	NI Assembly	UK Parliament	Ref
1	Andersonstown	4,907	94.5%	3.6%	0.3%	1.6%	1.08 km^{2}	4,544/km^{2}	Belfast West	Belfast West	
2	Falls Park	5,343	94.4%	3.3%	0.7%	1.6%	2.35 km^{2}	2,274/km^{2}	Belfast West	Belfast West	
3	Glen Road	5,573	95.1%	3.3%	0.5%	1.1%	1.57 km^{2}	3,550/km^{2}	Belfast West	Belfast West	
4	Glencolin	6,498	93.2%	5.1%	0.2%	1.5%	9.54 km^{2}	681/km^{2}	Belfast West	Belfast West	
5	Ladybrook	6,519	85.3%	10.9%	0.6%	3.1%	1.29 km^{2}	5,053/km^{2}	Belfast West	Belfast West	
Upper Falls		28,840	92.2%	5.5%	0.5%	1.8%	15.83 km^{2}	1,822/km^{2}	Belfast West	Belfast West	

== Councillors ==
Election	Councillor (Party)	Councillor (Party)	Councillor (Party)	Councillor (Party)	Councillor (Party)
2011	Emma Groves (Sinn Féin)	Gerard O'Neill (Sinn Féin)	Matt Garrett (Sinn Féin)	Caoimhin Mac Giolla Mhín (Sinn Féin)	Tim Attwood (SDLP)
2005	Paul Maskey (Sinn Féin)	Gerard O'Neill (Sinn Féin)	Michael Browne (Sinn Féin)	Christine Mhic Giolla Mhín (Sinn Féin)	Tim Attwood (SDLP)
2001	Paul Maskey (Sinn Féin)	Gerard O'Neill (Sinn Féin)	Michael Browne (Sinn Féin)	Chrissie McAuley (Sinn Féin)	Alex Attwood (SDLP)
1997	Alex Maskey (Sinn Féin)	Martin Livingstone (Sinn Féin)	Michael Browne (Sinn Féin)	Chrissie McAuley (Sinn Féin)	Alex Attwood (SDLP)
1993	Alex Maskey (Sinn Féin)	Una Gillespie (Sinn Féin)	Máirtín Ó Muilleoir (Sinn Féin)	Patricia Lewsley (SDLP)	Alex Attwood (SDLP)
1989	Alex Maskey (Sinn Féin)	Teresa Holland (Sinn Féin)	Máirtín Ó Muilleoir (Sinn Féin)	Cormac Boomer (SDLP)	Alex Attwood (SDLP)
1985	Alex Maskey (Sinn Féin)	Teresa Holland (Sinn Féin)	Pip Glendinning (Alliance)	Cormac Boomer (SDLP)	Alex Attwood (SDLP)

== 2011 Election ==
2005: 4 x Sinn Féin, 1 x SDLP

2011: 4 x Sinn Féin, 1 x SDLP

2005-2011 Change: No change

Upper Falls - 5 seats
Party	Candidate	FPv%	Count		
Party	Candidate	FPv%	1	2	3
Sinn Féin	Matt Garrett	18.00%	2,250		
Sinn Féin	Gerard O'Neill*	17.47%	2,184		
Sinn Féin	Emma Groves	17.07%	2,133		
SDLP	Tim Attwood*	16.12%	2,015	2,356	
Sinn Féin	Caoimhín Mac Giolla Mhín	15.28%	1,910	1,952	2,009
éirígí	Pádraic Mac Coitir	11.32%	1,415	1,428	1,474
SDLP	Helen Walsh	2.00%	250		
DUP	Eileen Kingston	1.43%	179		
Alliance	Dan McGuinness	1.30%	162		
Electorate: 20,530 Valid: 12,498 (60.88%) Spoilt: 298 Quota: 2,084 Turnout: 12,796 (62.33%)

== 2005 Election ==
2001: 4 x Sinn Féin, 1 x SDLP

2005: 4 x Sinn Féin, 1 x SDLP

2001-2005 Change: No change

Upper Falls - 5 seats
Party	Candidate	FPv%	Count			
Party	Candidate	FPv%	1	2	3	4
Sinn Féin	Paul Maskey*	23.69%	3,084			
SDLP	Tim Attwood	21.63%	2,815			
Sinn Féin	Gerard O'Neill*	18.81%	2,448			
Sinn Féin	Michael Browne*	17.34%	2,257			
Sinn Féin	Christine Mac Giolla Mhín	10.97%	1,428	2,070.32	2,089.57	2,325.41
SDLP	Roisin Mulholland	3.17%	413	467.56	1,025.56	1,031.83
Sinn Féin	Caoimhín Mac Giolla Mhín	4.39%	571	779.54	843.44	863.79
Electorate: 19,767 Valid: 13,016 (65.85%) Spoilt: 437 Quota: 2,170 Turnout: 13,453 (68.06%)

== 2001 Election ==
1997: 4 x Sinn Féin, 1 x SDLP

2001: 4 x Sinn Féin, 1 x SDLP

1997-2001 Change: No change

Upper Falls - 5 seats
Party	Candidate	FPv%	Count			
Party	Candidate	FPv%	1	2	3	4
Sinn Féin	Paul Maskey	21.81%	3,349			
SDLP	Alex Attwood*	21.23%	3,260			
Sinn Féin	Gerard O'Neill	18.66%	2,866			
Sinn Féin	Michael Browne*	16.08%	2,469	2,548.68	2,628.26	
Sinn Féin	Chrissie McAuley*	11.73%	1,801	2,442.52	2,494.96	2,592.96
SDLP	Brian Heading	7.24%	1,112	1,131.44	1,569.13	1,774.13
NI Women's Coalition	Mary Catney	2.38%	365	385.4	450.72	
Alliance	Mary Ayers	0.89%	136	137.92	183.69	
Electorate: 22,107 Valid: 15,358 (69.47%) Spoilt: 614 Quota: 2,560 Turnout: 15,972 (72.25%)

== 1997 Election ==
1993: 3 x Sinn Féin, 2 x SDLP

1997: 4 x Sinn Féin, 1 x SDLP

1993-1997 Change: Sinn Féin gain from SDLP

Upper Falls - 5 seats
Party	Candidate	FPv%	Count			
Party	Candidate	FPv%	1	2	3	4
SDLP	Alex Attwood*	20.42%	2,855			
Sinn Féin	Alex Maskey*	20.08%	2,807			
Sinn Féin	Michael Browne	18.45%	2,580			
Sinn Féin	Martin Livingstone	17.12%	2,394			
Sinn Féin	Chrissie McAuley	12.43%	1,738	1,754.02	2,181.23	2,401.37
SDLP	Patricia Lewsley*	4.26%	596	982.82	998.63	1,003.22
SDLP	Stephen McGowan	4.41%	616	707.98	719.54	721.7
DUP	David McNerlin	1.44%	201	201	201.17	201.26
Workers' Party	James McAllister	0.79%	110	113.96	117.7	119.23
Alliance	Dan McGuinness	0.61%	85	91.3	93.34	93.61
Electorate: 22,561 Valid: 13,982 (61.97%) Spoilt: 345 Quota: 2,331 Turnout: 14,327 (63.50%)

== 1993 Election ==
1989: 3 x Sinn Féin, 2 x SDLP

1993: 3 x Sinn Féin, 2 x SDLP

1989-1993 Change: No change

Upper Falls - 5 seats
Party	Candidate	FPv%	Count								
Party	Candidate	FPv%	1	2	3	4	5	6	7	8	9
SDLP	Alex Attwood*	24.08%	3,203								
Sinn Féin	Una Gillespie	20.79%	2,765								
Sinn Féin	Alex Maskey*	20.56%	2,735								
Sinn Féin	Mairtin O'Muilleoir*	15.74%	2,093	2,114.12	2,629.32						
SDLP	Patricia Lewsley	6.00%	798	1,428.72	1,437.72	1,602.89	1,623.89	1,625.89	1,670.62	1,774.2	2,122.7
SDLP	Terence Tracey	5.28%	702	888.24	891.64	1,007.84	1,019.24	1,027.24	1,059.73	1,167.52	1,327.21
Ind. Nationalist	Cormac Boomer*	2.84%	378	474.96	477.56	582.14	594.34	595.34	626.15	744.45	
Independent Labour	Billy Lynn	1.08%	144	154.24	158.24	242.9	260.7	271.85	298.53		
Alliance	Julie Greaves	1.09%	145	173.8	175.4	186.19	187.39	253.59	266.7		
Workers' Party	James Maxwell	1.23%	164	171.36	173.56	206.76	208.36	217.36			
DUP	David McNerlin	1.31%	174	174.64	174.64	176.3	176.7				
Electorate: 21,948 Valid: 13,301 (60.60%) Spoilt: 424 Quota: 2,217 Turnout: 13,725 (62.53%)

== 1989 Election ==
1985: 2 x Sinn Féin, 2 x SDLP, 1 x Alliance

1989: 3 x Sinn Féin, 2 x SDLP

1985-1989 Change: Sinn Féin gain from Alliance

Upper Falls - 5 seats
Party	Candidate	FPv%	Count						
Party	Candidate	FPv%	1	2	3	4	5	6	7
SDLP	Alex Attwood*	26.53%	3,292						
Sinn Féin	Alex Maskey*	19.26%	2,378						
Sinn Féin	Teresa Holland*	18.77%	2,329						
SDLP	Cormac Boomer*	9.58%	1,189	2,202.46					
Sinn Féin	Mairtin O'Muilleoir	15.74%	1,435	1,462.74	1,739.64	1,976.47	2,000.75	2,004.3	2,004.67
SDLP	Peter Prendiville	5.75%	713	815.98	819.1	820.97	834.35	935.6	962.75
Alliance	Dan McGuinness	2.63%	326	363.24	365.71	368.35	374.73	384.88	505.88
Workers' Party	Jean Craig	3.06%	380	409.64	411.72	413.48	432.48	443.83	488.83
DUP	Robert Morrow	2.28%	283	283	283.39	283.72	283.72	283.97	
Communist	Kevin O'Donnell	0.68%	84	87.04	89.77	90.54			
Electorate: 22,975 Valid: 12,409 (54.01%) Spoilt: 426 Quota: 2,069 Turnout: 12,835 (55.87%)

== 1985 Election ==
1985: 2 x Sinn Féin, 2 x SDLP, 1 x Alliance

Upper Falls - 5 seats
Party	Candidate	FPv%	Count								
Party	Candidate	FPv%	1	2	3	4	5	6	7	8	9
SDLP	Alex Attwood	19.35%	2,461								
Sinn Féin	Alex Maskey	18.30%	2,329								
Sinn Féin	Teresa Holland	17.73%	2,256								
SDLP	Cormac Boomer*	13.01%	1,655	1,890.43	1,897.72	1,900.42	1,903.42	1,958.24	2,028.22	2,161.22	
Alliance	Pip Glendinning	7.32%	931	947.38	949.9	951.16	955.16	958.73	994.31	1,334.43	1,805.43
Sinn Féin	Mairtin O'Muilleoir	8.01%	1,031	1,034.25	1,214.16	1,334.58	1,339.82	1,410.1	1,440.06	1,461.64	1,561.64
SDLP	Mary Muldoon*	6.28%	799	834.36	840.84	843.36	850.36	903.78	940.23	1,035.15	
Workers' Party	Gerald McCann	3.03%	386	389.77	390.67	391.63	405.76	413.51	463.37		
DUP	Irene Lewis	2.92%	372	372.39	372.39	372.51	372.6	372.6	374.6		
Labour and Trade Union	Michael Duffy	1.87%	238	243.2	244.82	246.14	255.14	273.81			
People's Democracy	John McAnulty*	1.03%	131	131.91	137.67	140.73	146				
SDLP	Peter Prendiville	0.57%	72	87.86	88.04	88.28	90.5				
Communist	Kevin McCorry	0.47%	60	60.39	61.11	61.17					
Electorate: 23,327 Valid: 12,721 (54.53%) Spoilt: 331 Quota: 2,121 Turnout: 13,052 (55.95%)

== See also ==
- Belfast City Council
- Electoral wards of Belfast
- Local government in Northern Ireland
- Members of Belfast City Council
