= William Dickson (Northern Ireland politician) =

Northern Irish unionist politician (born 1947)

Billy Dickson

Leader of the South Belfast Unionists
- In office 6 April 2016 – 22 June 2020
- Preceded by: Office created
- Succeeded by: Office abolished

Member of Belfast City Council
- In office 18 May 1977 – 15 May 1985
- Preceded by: William Spence
- Succeeded by: Seat abolished
- Constituency: Belfast Area F
- In office 15 May 1985 – 17 May 1989
- Preceded by: Seat created
- Succeeded by: Dorita Field
- Constituency: Balmoral

Personal details
- Born: January 1947 (age 79) Greencastle, Northern Ireland
- Party: Traditional Unionist Voice (2014; 2023 - present); Democratic Unionist Party (1971 - 1986); Protestant Unionist (1966 - 1971)
- Other political affiliations: South Belfast Unionist (2016 - 2020); NI Conservative (1989 - 1993); Independent Unionist (1986 - 1989)

William Dickson (born January 1947), known as Billy Dickson, is a Northern Irish unionist politician and Belfast tour guide who was a Belfast City Councillor for Belfast Area F from 1977 to 1985, and then for Balmoral from 1985 to 1989.

== Early life and education ==
Dickson was born in Greencastle, and grew up off the Donegall Road in Belfast, where he studied at Kelvin Secondary School.

== Career ==
Dickson first rose to prominence in 1970, as the secretary of the Donegall Road Defence Committee, at which time he was also active in Ian Paisley's Protestant Unionist Party (PUP).

Dickson was a founder member of the Democratic Unionist Party (DUP), the successor to the PUP. He was elected to Belfast City Council in 1977, and again stood for the party in Belfast West at the 1979 UK general election, taking third place with 11.2% of the vote. He was able to hold his council seat in 1981.

Dickson was selected as a candidate for Belfast West at the 1982 Northern Ireland Assembly election. Six weeks before the election, he was shot at his home by members of the Irish National Liberation Army. He survived the attack, although he was unable to take part in the remainder of the election campaign, and narrowly failed to win election.

Although Dickson was re-elected at the 1985 local election, and served as Deputy Lord Mayor of Belfast in 1986, he then left the DUP and stood as an independent Unionist in 1989 local election, losing his seat. He subsequently joined the Conservatives in Northern Ireland, but again missed election when he stood for them in 1993.

Outside politics, Dickson long worked at the Ulster Museum, but later became a tour guide, specialising in the history of Belfast and the Ulster Covenant. He served as a Royal Ulster Constabulary Reservist, and from 2007 had a weekly column in the South Belfast Community Telegraph.

Dickson later joined Traditional Unionist Voice, and at the 2014 Northern Ireland local elections, he stood unsuccessfully for the party in Botanic. He subsequently left the party, and in 2016 formed his own organisation, South Belfast Unionists, for which he stood in Belfast South at the 2016 Northern Ireland Assembly election, taking 351 first preference votes.

Civic offices
Preceded by Hugh Smyth	Deputy Lord Mayor of Belfast; 1985–1986	Succeeded by Dixie Gilmore
