= Jim Walker (Northern Ireland politician) =

Democratic Unionist Party politician

High Sheriff of Belfast
- In office 1993–1994
- Preceded by: Thomas Patton
- Succeeded by: Margaret Crooks

Member of Belfast City Council
- In office 15 May 1985 – 21 May 1997
- Preceded by: New district
- Succeeded by: David Ervine
- Constituency: Pottinger

Personal details
- Born: Belfast, Northern Ireland
- Died: 23 September 2022
- Party: Independent Unionist (1995-1997); Democratic Unionist Party (until 1995)

James Junior Walker (died 23 September 2022) was a former Democratic Unionist Party (DUP) politician who was the High Sheriff of Belfast between 1993 and 1994. He served as a Belfast City Councillor for the Pottinger DEA from 1985 to 1997.

== Background ==
Walker was first elected to Belfast City Council at the 1985 election, being one of three Democratic Unionist Party (DUP) representatives, for the Pottinger district.

In 1993, he was appointed High Sheriff of Belfast. During his time in office, Walker initially objected to the ‘Monument to the Unknown Worker’, a piece commemorating working-class women in Belfast, as being a symbol of prostitution. However, he later supported the monument, paying tribute to the women “who worked, who cleaned, who scrubbed, who actually went out and earned a living.”
