= Margaret Crooks =

Former deputy lord mayor of Belfast

Deputy Lord Mayor of Belfast
- In office 3 June 2003 – June 2004
- Preceded by: Hugh Smyth (2002)
- Succeeded by: Joe O'Donnell
- In office June 1996 – June 1997
- Preceded by: Alasdair McDonnell
- Succeeded by: Jim Rodgers

High Sheriff of Belfast
- In office January 1994 – January 1995
- Preceded by: Jim Walker
- Succeeded by: John Parkes

Member of Belfast City Council
- In office 15 May 1985 – 5 May 2005
- Preceded by: New district
- Succeeded by: Jim Kirkpatrick
- Constituency: Balmoral
- In office 18 May 1977 – 15 May 1985
- Preceded by: W.D. Gilmore
- Succeeded by: District abolished
- Constituency: Belfast Area C

Personal details
- Born: Belfast, Northern Ireland
- Died: April 2014
- Political party: Ulster Unionist Party

Mary Margaret Crooks (died April 2014) was an Ulster Unionist Party (UUP) politician who served as deputy Lord Mayor of Belfast from June 2003 to June 2004, having previously been in the role from 1996 to 1997. Additionally, Crooks was High Sheriff of Belfast between 1994 and 1995. She served as a Belfast City councillor from 1977 until 2005.

== Background ==
Crooks was first elected to Belfast City Council at the 1977 local elections, representing Belfast Area C.

In 1994, she was made High Sheriff of Belfast, becoming the fifth woman to serve in the role.

At the 2001 Council election, Crooks topped the poll in Balmoral.

Following the appointment of the SDLP's Martin Morgan as Lord Mayor of Belfast in June 2003, she served as his deputy.
