= Bob Stoker =

British politician

The Right Honourable Bob Stoker
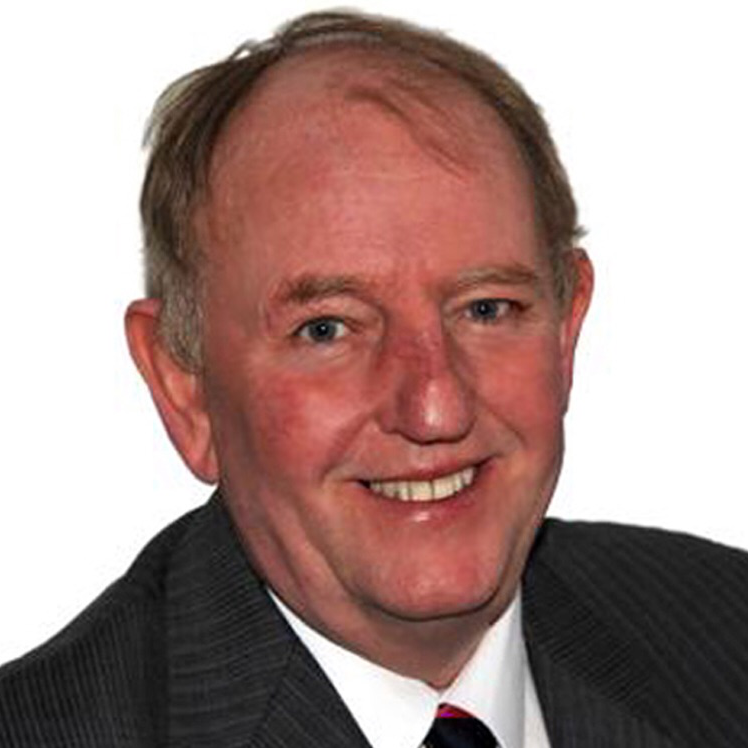

Vice chairman of UKIP Northern Ireland
- In office 2015–2017
- Leader: David McNarry

56th Lord Mayor of Belfast
- In office 1 June 1999 – 1 June 2000
- Deputy: Marie Moore
- Preceded by: David Alderdice
- Succeeded by: Sammy Wilson

Member of Belfast City Council
- In office 1995 – 22 May 2014
- Preceded by: Jim Kirkpatrick
- Succeeded by: Jeff Dudgeon
- Constituency: Balmoral

Northern Ireland Forum Member for South Belfast
- In office 30 May 1996 – 25 April 1998
- Preceded by: New forum
- Succeeded by: Forum dissolved

Personal details
- Born: Belfast, Northern Ireland
- Party: UKIP (2014 - 2017); Ulster Unionist (until 2014)

Robert Stoker is a Northern Irish Community Worker and former unionist politician in South Belfast who was Lord Mayor of Belfast from 1999 to 2000, and an Ulster Unionist Party (UUP) Belfast City councillor for the Balmoral DEA from 1995 to 2014.

== Biography ==
As a member of the Ulster Unionist Party, Stoker was elected to the Northern Ireland Forum for Belfast South in May 1996. He had already been elected as a councillor to represent the Balmoral electoral area in a by-election in May 1995. He was re-elected in May 1997, June 2001 and June 2005 and 2011.

He was elected Deputy Lord Mayor of the city in June 1998 and Lord Mayor of Belfast in June 1999.

He contested the Belfast South constituency in the 2007 Northern Ireland Assembly election, but was unsuccessful, finishing 9th out of 18 candidates with 1,122 votes, 3.7% of the total first preference votes cast.

Alderman Stoker, by then one of Belfast's longest serving councillors, left the Ulster Unionist Party in October 2014 to join the UK Independence Party (UKIP). He cited wanting to be "part of a national party" and claimed that the old unionist parties were neglecting the very people on the ground who elected them. He contested the 2015 general election for UKIP in South Belfast finishing 7th with 1900 votes (4.9% of the total share).

In 2015, Stoker was appointed as Vice Chairman of UKIP in Northern Ireland by the local membership of the party. He was his party's candidate in South Belfast at the 2016 Assembly election, but was not elected.

In 2017, Stoker retired from active politics to focus on his work as a Community Worker in South Belfast.

Northern Ireland Forum
New forum	Member for South Belfast; 1996–1998	Forum dissolved
Civic offices
Preceded by Jim Rodgers	Deputy Lord Mayor of Belfast; 1998–1999	Succeeded by Marie Moore
Preceded by David Alderdice	Lord Mayor of Belfast; 1999–2000	Succeeded by Sammy Wilson
