= Joe Coggle =

Northern Irish politician (1930–2012)

High Sheriff of Belfast
- In office January 1995 – January 1996
- Preceded by: John Parkes
- Succeeded by: Steve McBride
- In office January 1991 – January 1992
- Preceded by: Jim Kirkpatrick
- Succeeded by: Thomas Patton

Member of Belfast City Council
- In office 15 May 1985 – 21 May 1997
- Preceded by: New district
- Succeeded by: Frank McCoubrey
- Constituency: Court
- In office 20 May 1981 – 15 May 1985
- Preceded by: Herbert Ditty
- Succeeded by: District abolished
- Constituency: Belfast Area G

Personal details
- Born: November 1930 Shankill, Belfast, Northern Ireland
- Died: August 2012
- Party: Independent Unionist (from 1985)
- Other political affiliations: DUP (before 1985)

Joseph Addis Coggle (November 1930 – August 2012) was a Northern Irish Ulster Loyalist politician who was High Sheriff of Belfast from 1991 to 1992, and 1995 to 1996. He served on Belfast City Council from 1981 until 1997, latterly for the Court DEA.

== Background ==
As a member of the Democratic Unionist Party (DUP), Coggle was elected to Belfast City Council in 1981 for the Belfast Area G district.

By 1985, he had resigned from the DUP, and was instead re-elected as an independent unionist for the new Court district.

In 1986, Coggle was seen attending the funeral of murdered Ulster Volunteer Force (UVF) commander John Bingham. He described Bingham as "the best" in a Belfast Telegraph obituary.

At the 1996 Northern Ireland Forum elections, Coggle ran as part of an independent group of candidates, headed by North Down councillor Alan Chambers. He was the group's lead candidate in the North Belfast constituency, finishing last, and taking only 21 votes (0.05%). For the 'top-up list', Coggle was the second-placed candidate, though neither he nor the group were successful in winning any seats.

Coggle was defeated by the Ulster Democratic Party's Frank McCoubrey at the 1997 local elections.
