= Dorita Field =

South African-born town planner and politician in Northern Ireland

Member of the Northern Ireland Forum
- In office 30 May 1996 – 25 April 1998
- Preceded by: Forum created
- Succeeded by: Forum abolished
- Constituency: Top-up list

Member of Belfast City Council
- In office 17 May 1989 – 21 May 1997
- Preceded by: Billy Dickson
- Succeeded by: Carmel Hanna
- Constituency: Balmoral

Personal details
- Born: Dorita Wilson; 1922; Pietermaritzburg, South Africa
- Died: 31 December 2004 (aged 82); Belfast, Northern Ireland
- Political party: SDLP

Dorita Field (1922 – 31 December 2004) was a South African-born town planner and politician in Northern Ireland.

== Early life and education ==
Born as Dorita Wilson to a Protestant family in Pietermaritzburg, she studied zoology and mathematics at the University of South Africa.

== Career ==
During World War II, she served in the South African Women's Naval Service on Robben Island. While working in the medical corps, she met a Northern Irishman, Dr. Claude Field. The two married and then moved to Belfast in 1946. Field then studied social work and town planning at Queen's University Belfast, and worked in this field, going on to teach at the Rupert Stanley college of further education. She eventually becoming Director of Community Services at Belfast City Council having previously worked on the redevelopment in the Markets and the Shankill, and conducted a comparative study of the Ballymurphy and New Barnsley estates which drew correlations between rental arrears and unemployment. In this role, she developed leisure centres in Belfast. She served as president of the Royal Town Planning Institute NI from 1979 to 1980.

== Political career ==
After retiring in 1982, she spent two years in Zimbabwe, chairing a Catholic organisation documenting human rights abuses following the Zimbabwe War of Independence.

On returning to Northern Ireland, she joined the Social Democratic and Labour Party (SDLP), which she claimed was the only party standing in the democratic socialist tradition she shared. Unlike the majority of the party, she claimed not to be an Irish nationalist. She was the party treasurer in the early 1990s, and attempted to ease the party's financial issues. In 1989, she was elected to Belfast City Council, becoming the first member of a nationalist party to represent the Balmoral area. In 1993, her home was firebombed by the Ulster Freedom Fighters, on the same night that Alasdair McDonnell's house was attacked. During this period, she broke with SDLP tradition by attending Remembrance Day commemorations alongside Unionists, for which she wore both a red and a pacifist white poppy.

Field, who had campaigned against apartheid, spent three months on a European Union team monitoring the 1994 South African general election. In 1996, she was elected to the Northern Ireland Forum as one of the SDLP's two "top-up" members.

== Later life and legacy ==
Dorita Field died on New Year's Eve 2004, aged 82. She was survived by her husband, two children and grandchildren.

Northern Ireland Forum
New forum	Regional Member; 1996–1998	Forum dissolved
