= Máirtín Ó Muilleoir =

Irish politician (born 1949)

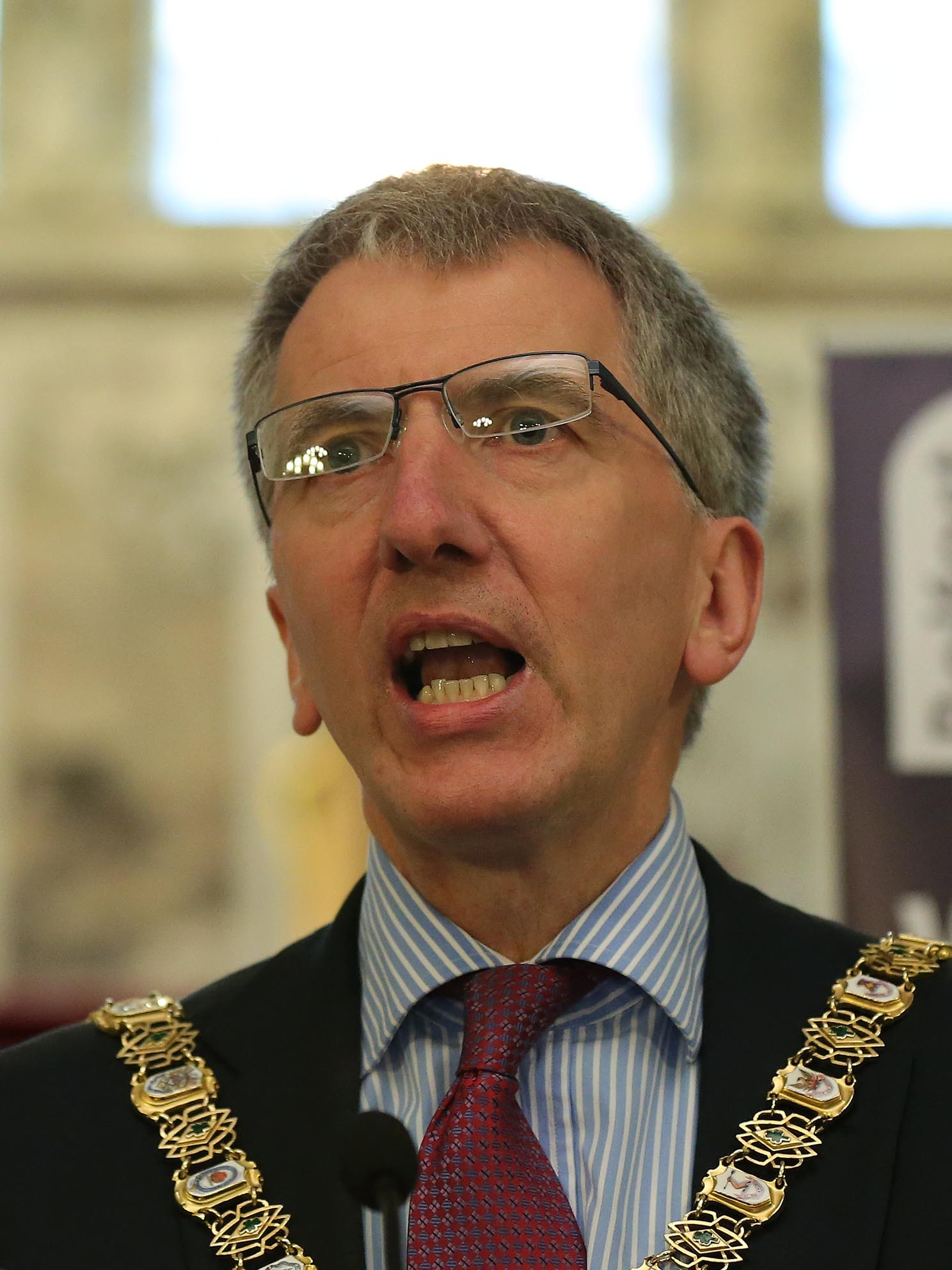
- Ó Muilleoir in 2013

Minister for Finance of Northern Ireland
- In office 12 May 2016 – 7 January 2017
- Preceded by: Mervyn Storey
- Succeeded by: Conor Murphy

Member of the Northern Ireland Assembly for Belfast South
- In office 4 November 2014 – 7 January 2020
- Preceded by: Alex Maskey
- Succeeded by: Deirdre Hargey

70th Lord Mayor of Belfast
- In office 2 June 2013 – 2 June 2014
- Preceded by: Gavin Robinson
- Succeeded by: Nichola Mallon

Member of Belfast City Council
- In office 5 May 2011 – 7 January 2020
- Preceded by: Jim Kirkpatrick
- Succeeded by: Geraldine McAteer
- Constituency: Balmoral
- In office 1987 – 21 May 1997
- Preceded by: Pip Glendinning
- Succeeded by: Michael Browne
- Constituency: Upper Falls

Personal details
- Born: 31 December 1959 (age 66) Belfast, Northern Ireland, UK
- Party: Sinn Féin
- Spouse: Helen O'Hare
- Children: 4
- Education: St Mary's Christian Brothers' Grammar School, Belfast
- Alma mater: Queen's University Belfast
- Profession: Publisher; businessman

Máirtín Ó Muilleoir (born 31 December 1959) is an Irish Sinn Féin politician, author, publisher, and businessman, who served as the 70th Lord Mayor of Belfast from 2013 to 2014.

Ó Muilleoir's siblings include writer, blogger, and Huffington Post columnist Adrian Millar, and journalist and editor Gerry Millar/Gearóid Ó Muilleoir of The Belfast Telegraph.

== Early life and education ==
Ó Muilleoir was educated at St Mary's Christian Brothers' Grammar School, Belfast, and at Queen's University Belfast.

== Career ==
=== Business career ===
In 1997, Ó Muilleoir became part-owner of the Andersonstown News, which subsequently purchased the New York-based Irish Echo. A fluent Irish speaker, he has interests in other Irish and American businesses. He served as a temporary director of Northern Ireland Water.

=== Political career ===
Ó Muilleoir entered politics in 1985, when he stood as a Sinn Féin candidate for the Upper Falls area and narrowly missed out on being elected.

When Pip Glendinning of the Alliance Party resigned her seat two years later due to the birth of Glendinning's daughter, Ó Muilleoir won the resulting by-election in October 1987. During his time on the council, he initiated a number of legal actions over what he claimed was discrimination by the unionist-dominated council, detailing these experiences in his book, The Dome of Delight.

He was re-elected at the 1989 and 1993 local elections, retiring at the 1997 local elections to concentrate on his business interests. In 1996, he was an unsuccessful candidate in the Northern Ireland Forum election in North Down.

He re-entered politics in 2011, when he was elected as a Belfast City Councillor for Balmoral, South Belfast, gaining the seat previously held by Jim Kirkpatrick of the Democratic Unionist Party, and was elected Lord Mayor in 2013, serving a one-year term.

In 2014, he was co-opted as an MLA into the Northern Ireland Assembly. He stood in Belfast South in the 2015 United Kingdom general election, losing to the Social Democratic and Labour Party incumbent, Alasdair McDonnell. On 12 May 2016, he was appointed Minister of Finance in the Northern Ireland Executive. He resigned as an MLA in December 2019, and Deirdre Hargey was co-opted in his place.

Civic offices
Preceded by Gavin Robinson	Lord Mayor of Belfast; 2013–2014	Succeeded by Nichola Mallon
Northern Ireland Assembly
Preceded by Alex Maskey	MLA for Belfast South; 2014–2020	Succeeded by Deirdre Hargey
Political offices
Preceded by Mervyn Storey	Minister of Finance; 2016–2017	Succeeded by Conor Murphy
