= Jim Kirkpatrick (Northern Ireland politician) =

Northern Irish unionist politician

High Sheriff of Belfast
- In office 2007–2008
- Preceded by: William Humphrey
- Succeeded by: Margaret McKenzie
- In office 1990–1991
- Preceded by: Vacant
- Succeeded by: Joe Coggle

Member of Belfast City Council
- In office 5 May 2005 – 5 May 2011
- Preceded by: Mary Crooks
- Succeeded by: Máirtín Ó Muilleoir
- Constituency: Balmoral
- In office 15 May 1985 – 21 May 1997
- Preceded by: District created
- Succeeded by: Bob Stoker
- Constituency: Balmoral

Member of the Northern Ireland Assembly for Belfast South
- In office 1982–1986

Personal details
- Born: Belfast, Northern Ireland
- Party: UUP (pre 1996; 1997-2004; 2009 - present)
- Other political affiliations: DUP (1996-1997; 2004-2009)

Jim Kirkpatrick is a Northern Irish unionist politician who has represented the Ulster Unionist Party (UUP) three times and the Democratic Unionist Party (DUP) twice.

== Political career ==
Kirkpatrick was first elected as a UUP member of the Northern Ireland Assembly for Belfast South in 1982. Three years later he was elected to Belfast City Council, representing the Balmoral electoral area, which covered the Lisburn, Malone and Donegal Road areas of the city.

Kirkpatrick joined the Democratic Unionist Party (DUP) in 1996 and lost his council seat in 1997, having moved from Balmoral to Laganbank. He subsequently rejoined the UUP and became chairman of the Drumbo branch in Lagan Valley.

He was selected to contest the elections to the Northern Ireland Assembly in 2003 by Lagan Valley UUP in a controversial selection meeting but polled fewer than 700 votes and was quickly eliminated.

Following this, in December 2004 he again defected to the DUP and was returned for that party to Belfast City Council in 2005, regaining his original seat in Balmoral. In 2007 however, Kirkpatrick was pictured at a fundraising dinner with Jim Allister MEP, held to raise funds for a new Unionist Party opposed to powersharing. On 2 June 2009 he again defected back to the UUP, accusing senior DUP members of "caring more about dynasty building and expense claims than voters." He lost his seat at the 2011 council elections to businessman and publisher Máirtín Ó Muilleoir (Sinn Féin).

Kirkpatrick served as High Sheriff before, having fulfilled the role in 1990. He was sworn in again as High Sheriff of Belfast in a traditional ceremony at Belfast City Hall in January 2007, succeeding Councillor William Humphrey. He is a member of Malone Presbyterian Church, the Masonic Order and the Orange Order.

Northern Ireland Assembly (1982)
New assembly	MPA for South Belfast; 1982–1986	Assembly abolished
Civic offices
Vacant Office suspended Title last held by Herbert Ditty	High Sheriff of Belfast; 1990–1991	Succeeded by Joe Coggle
Preceded by William Humphrey	High Sheriff of Belfast; 2007–2008	Succeeded by Margaret McKenzie
