= Victoria (District Electoral Area) =

Electoral division in east Belfast, Northern Ireland

Victoria District Electoral Area
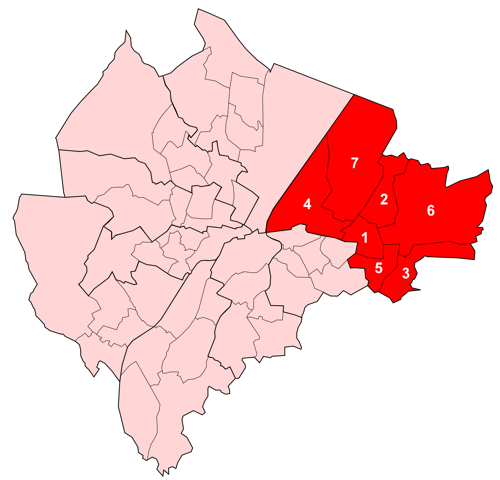
- Map showing Victoria wards within Belfast
- Area: 20.2 km^{2} (7.8 sq mi)
- Population: 36,607 (2008 Estimate)
  - Density: 1,812/km^{2} (4,690/sq mi)
- District: Belfast City Council
- County: County Down
- Country: Northern Ireland
- Sovereign state: United Kingdom
- UK Parliament: Belfast East
- NI Assembly: Belfast East

Victoria was one of the nine district electoral areas (DEA) in Belfast, Northern Ireland, from 1985 to 2014, when it was mostly replaced by the Ormiston district.

Located in the east of the city, the district elected seven members to Belfast City Council and contained the wards of Ballyhackamore; Belmont; Cherryvalley; Island; Knock; Stormont; and Sydenham. Victoria, along with wards from the neighbouring Pottinger district and Castlereagh Borough Council, formed the Belfast East constituency for the Northern Ireland Assembly and UK Parliament.

The district was bounded to the west by the Victoria Channel, to the north by Belfast Lough, to the northeast by North Down Borough Council, to the south and east by Castlereagh Borough Council and to the southwest by the Newtownards Road.

At each election throughout the district's existence, most of the councillors elected were Unionist.

== History ==
The DEA was created for the 1985 local elections local elections as the successor to the former Area B, which all seven wards in the new Victoria had been part of. An eighth ward, Bloomfield, which had been in Area B, was placed in the new Pottinger electoral area.

It was abolished to make way for new DEAs that were used for the 2014 local elections. It was largely replaced by the new Ormiston District Electoral Area. Five of Victoria's wards joined Ormiston, with the Sydenham ward and the areas which had been part of the abolished Island ward becoming part of the new Titanic District Electoral Area.

== Area ==
The district contained many key pieces of Belfast's transport infrastructure, including George Best Belfast City Airport and the eastern portion of Belfast Harbour. The area is served by the Bridge End and Sydenham railway stations and the A2 and A20 major road routes. The district is also home to Parliament Buildings, the meeting place of the Northern Ireland Assembly.

Victoria was once the site of much of Belfast's heavy industrial manufacturing facilities, however these have suffered a significant decline since the mid-twentieth century, although companies such as Short Brothers and Harland and Wolff continue to have significant operations in the area.

=== Oil refinery ===
The Sydenham oil refinery was opened by BP. Construction started in January 1962, and it was expected to open in late 1963. It would refine 1.3m tons per year, to cost £8m. The jetty was built by Wimpey.

The main process units, with a hydrofiner, were built by Parsons Powergas, a joint venture of the Parsons Corporation and Power-Gas Corporation, of the UK. The steam raising plant was by Mitchell Engineering. It was opened in early February 1964, and officially opened by the Duke of Edinburgh on Thursday May 7 1964. It was the smallest oil refinery in the UK, and closed in late 1982.

=== Former BCDR mainline ===
The Belfast and County Down Railway had a mainline through Knock railway station which linked Belfast direct to Downpatrick railway station as well as to Newcastle, County Down, there was also the branch from Comber railway station to Newtownards and Donaghadee. The mainline opened in 1850 was closed in 1950 by the Ulster Transport Authority.

== Titanic Quarter ==
The Titanic Quarter is a major economic and cultural regeneration programme that is centred on Queen's Island and the former Harland and Wolff shipyard. The project has seen the construction of new hotels, apartment blocks and business facilities, with a number of high-profile relocations, including the Public Record Office of Northern Ireland. The area has also become a centre for learning and research with the opening of the Catalyst Inc, in addition to Belfast Metropolitan College moving one of its key city centre campuses to the Quarter, while Queen's University Belfast have also located their Institute of Electronics, Communications and Information Technology (ECIT) within the Science Park. The Quarter's name comes from the RMS Titanic which was constructed in the old shipyard, with a number of projects aimed at exploiting the tourism value of the Titanic's connection to Belfast, including the Samson and Goliath cranes used to construct the ship and the Paint Hall.

== Other amenities ==
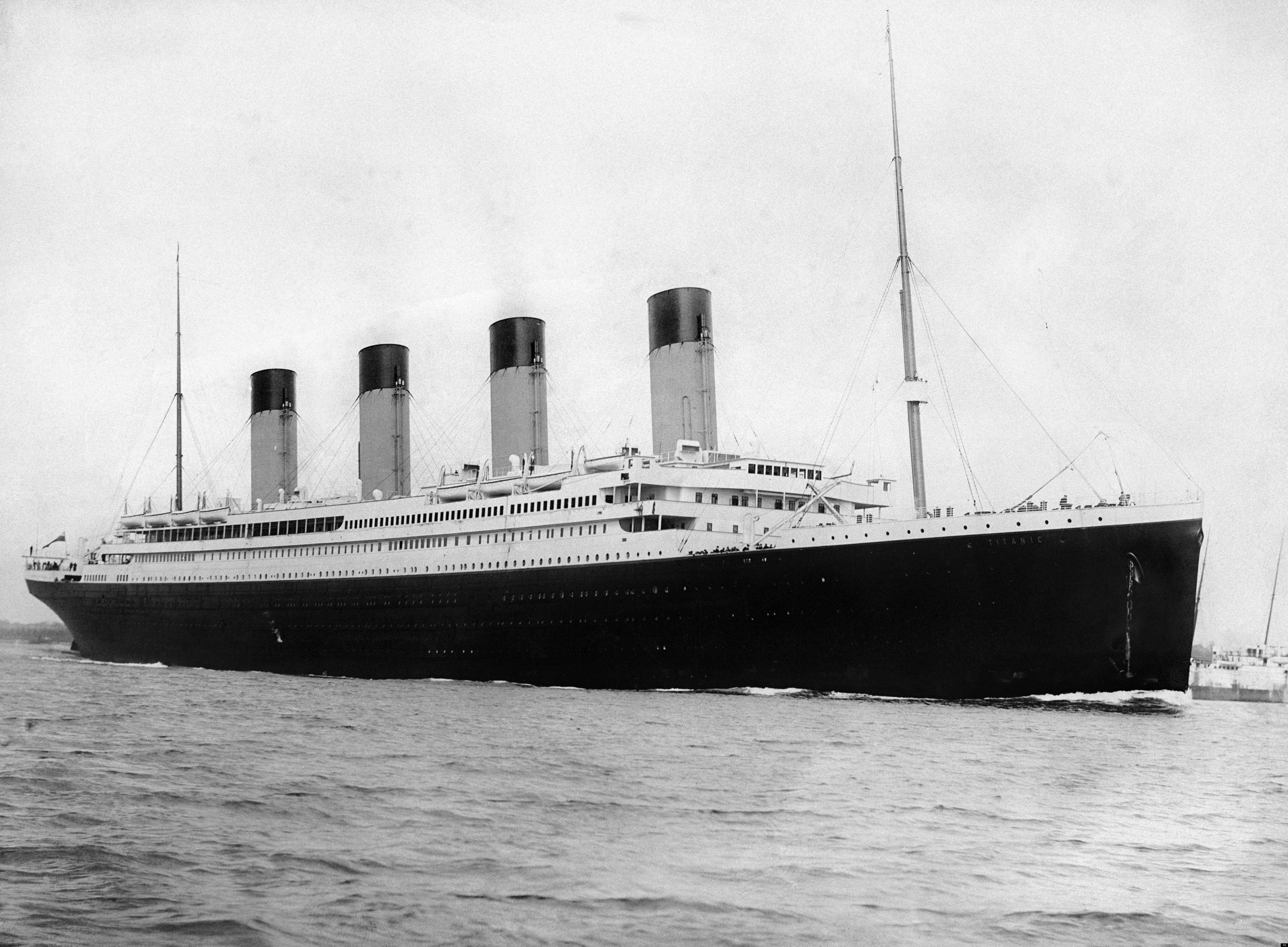
The RMS Titanic, built in Belfast by Harland and Wolff.

Other amenities in the Victoria district electoral area include:

- Ashfield Boys' High School
- Campbell College
- The Comber Greenway, a 7-mile (11 km) traffic-free section of the National Cycle Network, along the old Belfast-Comber railway line
- HMS Caroline
- Holywood Exchange, a major retail development
- Odyssey Arena, a major entertainment complex
- Our Lady and St. Patrick's College, Knock
- The Oval Stadium, home ground of Glentoran F.C.
- Stormont Estate

- Dundonald House
- Stormont Castle
- Stormont House

- Strandtown Primary School
- Strathearn School
- Wilgar Park, the home ground of Dundela F.C.

== Wards ==
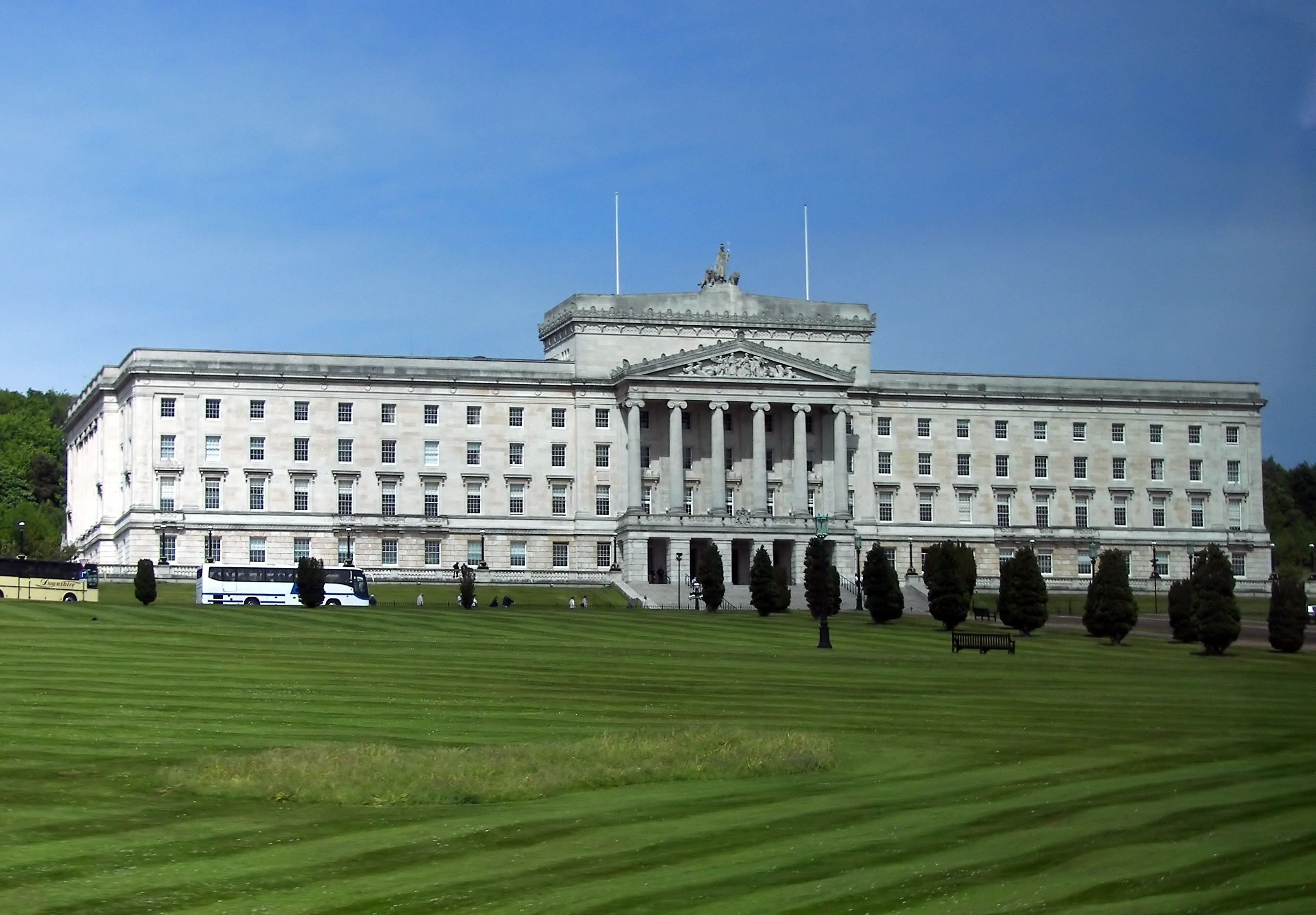
Parliament Buildings, Stormont

Map	Ward	Population (2011 Census)	Catholic	Protestant	Other	No Religion	Area	Density	NI Assembly	UK Parliament	Ref
1	Ballyhackamore	5,939	17.2%	68.2%	1.9%	12.7%	1.15 km^{2}	5,164 /km^{2}	Belfast East	Belfast East	
2	Belmont	6,165	8.6%	80.6%	1%	9.8%	1.79 km^{2}	3,444 /km^{2}	Belfast East	Belfast East	
3	Cherryvalley	5,920	14.5%	75.3%	0.8%	9.4%	1.99 km^{2}	2,975 /km^{2}	Belfast East	Belfast East	
4	Island	5,014	13.9%	69.8%	4.6%	11.8%	3.81 km^{2}	1,316 /km^{2}	Belfast East	Belfast East	
5	Knock	4,827	9.1%	79.7%	1.2%	10%	1.12 km^{2}	4,310 /km^{2}	Belfast East	Belfast East	
6	Stormont	5,548	12.9%	75.6%	1.3%	10.2%	7.04 km^{2}	788 /km^{2}	Belfast East	Belfast East	
7	Sydenham	4,874	9.9%	76%	1.8%	12.3%	6.24 km^{2}	781 /km^{2}	Belfast East	Belfast East	
Victoria		38,287	12.4%	75%	1.7%	10.8%	23.14 km^{2}	1,655 /km^{2}			

== Councillors ==
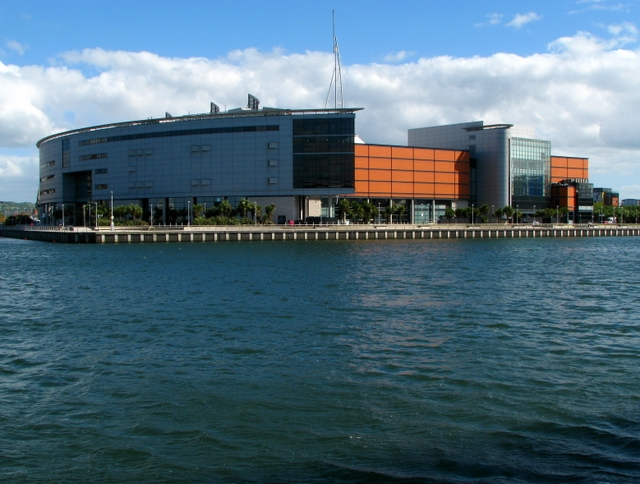
Odyssey Arena, a major entertainment complex

Election	Councillor (Party)	Councillor (Party)	Councillor (Party)	Councillor (Party)	Councillor (Party)	Councillor (Party)	Councillor (Party)
2011	Mervyn Jones (Alliance)	Laura McNamee (Alliance)	Andrew Webb (Alliance)	Jim Rodgers (UUP)	Tom Haire (DUP)	John Hussey (DUP)	Robin Newton (DUP)
2005	Mervyn Jones (Alliance)	Naomi Long (Alliance)	Ian Adamson (UUP)	Jim Rodgers (UUP)	David Rodway (DUP)	Wallace Browne (DUP)	Robin Newton (DUP)
2001	David Alderdice (Alliance)	Naomi Long (Alliance)	Ian Adamson (UUP)	Jim Rodgers (UUP)	Alan Crowe (UUP)/ (Independent Unionist)	Wallace Browne (DUP)	Robin Newton (DUP)
1997	David Alderdice (Alliance)	Danny Dow (Alliance)	Ian Adamson (UUP)	Jim Rodgers (UUP)	Alan Crowe (UUP)/ (Independent Unionist)	Wallace Browne (DUP)	Robin Newton (DUP)
1993	John Alderdice (Alliance)	Danny Dow (Alliance)	Ian Adamson (UUP)	Jim Rodgers (UUP)	Tommy Patton (UUP)	Wallace Browne (DUP)	Robin Newton (DUP)
1989	John Alderdice (Alliance)	Danny Dow (Alliance)	Ian Adamson (UUP)	Alan Montgomery (UUP)	Tommy Patton (UUP)	Wallace Browne (DUP)	Robin Newton (DUP)
1985	Oliver Napier (Alliance)	George Thompson (Alliance)	William Corry (UUP)	Dorothy Dunlop (UUP)	Tommy Patton (UUP)	Wallace Browne (DUP)	Robin Newton (DUP)

== 2011 election ==
2005: 3 x DUP, 2 x UUP, 2 x Alliance

2011: 3 x Alliance, 3 x DUP, 1 x UUP

2005-2011 Change: Alliance gain from UUP

Victoria - 7 seats
Party	Candidate	FPv%	Count									
Party	Candidate	FPv%	1	2	3	4	5	6	7	8	9	10
DUP	Robin Newton*	16.62%	2,338									
Alliance	Mervyn Jones*	16.49%	2,319									
Alliance	Laura McNamee	11.92%	1,677	1,686.5	2,049.14							
Alliance	Andrew Webb	8.08%	1,137	1,143	1,293.48	1,541.24	1,552.24	1,592.1	1,604.1	1,895.1		
UUP	Jim Rodgers*	9.63%	1,355	1,401.5	1,407.98	1,418.81	1,437.81	1,451.62	1,488.87	1,639.24	1,657.24	1,816.24
DUP	Tom Haire	10.22%	1,437	1,555.5	1,558.62	1,562.04	1,565.04	1,568.53	1,584.97	1,617.21	1,622.21	1,759.21
DUP	John Hussey	5.77%	812	1,149	1,151.64	1,154.11	1,158.11	1,166.36	1,184.86	1,210.54	1,217.54	1,476.12
UUP	Ian Adamson*	6.70%	942	955.25	962.69	967.25	989.5	1,003.69	1,028.19	1,112.99	1,131.9	1,228.49
PUP	Robert McCartney	6.46%	908	926.75	930.59	932.68	938.68	946.87	963.37	1,005.54	1,028.54	
Green (NI)	Ross Campbell	2.24%	315	317.25	322.53	325.95	334.14	353.14	359.14			
UUP	Stephen Warke	1.54%	216	222.5	224.42	226.32	232.51	237.51	246.51			
SDLP	Magdalena Wolska	1.47%	207	207.5	211.58	215.76	217.76	222	223			
TUV	Sammy Morrison	1.12%	158	160.25	160.25	161.01	162.01	175.01				
Independent	Roy Hobson	1.01%	142	143.75	145.43	147.14	158.39					
NI Conservatives	Garry Crosbie	0.73%	103	103.5	103.5	104.07						
Electorate: 25,814 Valid: 14,066 (54.49%) Spoilt: 280 Quota: 1,759 Turnout: 14,346 (55.57%)

== 2005 Election ==
2001: 3 x UUP, 2 x DUP, 2 x Alliance

2005: 3 x DUP, 2 x UUP, 2 x Alliance

2001-2005 Change: DUP gain from UUP

Victoria - 7 seats
Party	Candidate	FPv%	Count						
Party	Candidate	FPv%	1	2	3	4	5	6	7
DUP	Wallace Browne*	18.60%	2,689						
Alliance	Naomi Long*	17.74%	2,565						
UUP	Jim Rodgers*	16.88%	2,441						
DUP	Robin Newton*	13.86%	2,004						
UUP	Ian Adamson*	12.98%	1,877						
DUP	David Rodway	5.01%	725	1,527.4	1,549.72	1,635.12	1,810.52		
Alliance	Mervyn Jones	5.61%	811	815.42	1,421.47	1,456.75	1,458.85	1,461.82	1,838.82
UUP	Alan Crowe*	3.17%	459	508.98	582.76	1,041.76	1,050.86	1,099.16	1,366.16
SDLP	John Ó Doherty	2.35%	340	343.4	374.09	379.69	379.99	380.14	
PUP	John McQuillan	2.10%	303	310.82	321.36	337.88	340.38	340.89	
NI Conservatives	Peter Gray	1.68%	243	252.52	265.23	287.35	288.45	289.53	
Electorate: 25,058 Valid: 14,457 (57.69%) Spoilt: 349 Quota: 1,808 Turnout: 14,806 (59.09%)

== 2001 Election ==
1997: 2 x UUP, 2 x Alliance, 2 x DUP, 1 x Independent Unionist

2001: 3 x UUP, 2 x DUP, 2 x Alliance

1997-2001 Change: Independent Unionist joins UUP

Victoria - 7 seats
Party	Candidate	FPv%	Count								
Party	Candidate	FPv%	1	2	3	4	5	6	7	8	9
UUP	Ian Adamson*	19.43%	3,286								
Alliance	David Alderdice*	18.45%	3,119								
DUP	Wallace Browne*	14.74%	2,492								
UUP	Jim Rodgers*	13.73%	2,322								
UUP	Alan Crowe*	3.44%	582	1,569.16	1,716.04	1,727.89	1,858.75	1,881.65	2,011.63	2,194.63	
Alliance	Naomi Long	4.31%	729	776.36	1,399.58	1,401.23	1,407.62	1,416.83	1,702.74	1,792.2	2,017.89
DUP	Robin Newton*	8.69%	1,469	1,492.31	1,516.45	1,636	1,658.41	1,678.71	1,702.85	1,810.58	1,955.77
DUP	Margaret McKenzie	4.63%	783	811.12	826.76	1,045.16	1,059.29	1,076.49	1,111.65	1,226.47	1,426.49
Independent	Danny Dow*	4.41%	746	758.58	816.04	823.39	830.77	857.54	890.67	996.7	
PUP	Robert Moorhead	4.12%	697	715.87	736.27	739.87	745.72	761.15	795.85		
SDLP	Ciara Farren	1.80%	305	310.18	383.62	383.77	384.76	390.78			
NI Conservatives	Peter Gray	1.41%	239	261.57	284.35	286.45	291.76	301.92			
Independent	Sammy Walker	0.67%	114	123.25	130.39	130.39	133.36				
Independent	Billy Hands	0.09%	15	16.48	17.84	17.84	18.02				
Independent	Lawrence John	0.06%	11	12.11	14.15	14.15	14.24				
Electorate: 28,160 Valid: 17,468 (62.03%) Spoilt: 559 Quota: 2,114 Turnout: 16,909 (60.05%)

== 1997 Election ==
1993: 3 x UUP, 2 x Alliance, 2 x DUP

1997: 2 x UUP, 2 x Alliance, 2 x DUP, 1 x Independent Unionist

1993-1997 Change: Independent Unionist gain from UUP

Victoria - 7 seats
Party	Candidate	FPv%	Count								
Party	Candidate	FPv%	1	2	3	4	5	6	7	8	9
Alliance	David Alderdice	18.87%	2,419								
UUP	Ian Adamson*	18.46%	2,367								
Alliance	Danny Dow*	7.99%	1,024	1,609.14							
UUP	Jim Rodgers*	11.76%	1,508	1,532.14	1,921.58						
DUP	Wallace Browne*	11.58%	1,485	1,498.94	1,564.54	1,569.22	1,590.52	1,747.52			
DUP	Robin Newton*	8.08%	1,036	1,044.5	1,052.82	1,055.94	1,070.52	1,336.04	1,477.94	1,522.22	1,658.22
Ind. Unionist	Alan Crowe	4.05%	519	544.16	710.24	736.5	803.68	831.18	1,023.4	1,237.5	1,242.5
PUP	John McQuillan	7.14%	915	924.86	937.98	940.32	956.96	1,001.88	1,040.16	1,149.92	1,151.92
Alliance	Glyn Roberts	4.31%	553	675.74	698.78	702.94	761.48	771.26	842.62		
UUP	Peter Weir	1.50%	192	196.76	245.72	509.88	569.64	582.76			
DUP	Margaret McKenzie	4.08%	523	524.36	533	535.08	558.74				
NI Conservatives	Lesley Donaldson	2.00%	256	270.96	293.04	295.9					
Natural Law	Thomas Mullins	0.19%	25	27.38	27.7	27.96					
Electorate: 28,936 Valid: 12,822 (44.31%) Spoilt: 351 Quota: 1,603 Turnout: 13,173 (45.52%)

== 1993 Election ==
1989: 3 x UUP, 2 x Alliance, 2 x DUP

1993: 3 x UUP, 2 x Alliance, 2 x DUP

1989-1993 Change: No change

Victoria - 7 seats
Party	Candidate	FPv%	Count								
Party	Candidate	FPv%	1	2	3	4	5	6	7	8	9
Alliance	John Alderdice*	24.67%	3,337								
DUP	Wallace Browne*	15.92%	2,153								
UUP	Thomas Patton*	13.31%	1,801								
DUP	Robin Newton*	12.78%	1,729								
UUP	Ian Adamson*	9.73%	1,316	1,395.56	1,547.81	1,564.23	1,686.5	1,880.5			
Alliance	Danny Dow*	4.08%	552	1,543.44	1,564.9	1,642.89	1,661.29	1,761.29			
UUP	Jim Rodgers	4.44%	600	631.62	749.07	757.18	1,091.36	1,274.11	1,408.11	1,560.65	1,510.25
Alliance	Maureen McConnell	5.68%	768	1,159.68	1,169.54	1,220.19	1,226.21	1,368.9	1,387.9	1,393.92	1,454.4
NI Conservatives	Jim McCormick	5.06%	684	759.99	784.93	807.3	828.13				
UUP	John Norris	3.01%	407	435.56	554.17	561.97					
Green (NI)	Michael Bell	1.33%	180	218.76	225.72						
Electorate: 29,632 Valid: 13,527 (45.65%) Spoilt: 360 Quota: 1,691 Turnout: 13,887 (46.86%)

== 1989 Election ==
1985: 3 x UUP, 2 x Alliance, 2 x DUP

1989: 3 x UUP, 2 x Alliance, 2 x DUP

1985-1989 Change: No change

Victoria - 7 seats
Party	Candidate	FPv%	Count					
Party	Candidate	FPv%	1	2	3	4	5	6
Alliance	John Alderdice	21.67%	2,933					
UUP	Thomas Patton*	21.02%	2,845					
UUP	Ian Adamson	12.78%	1,730					
DUP	Wallace Browne*	10.15%	1,374	1,407.97	1,512.97	1,523.34	1,585.51	1,890.51
DUP	Robin Newton*	8.65%	1,171	1,177.88	1,274.06	1,287.33	1,346.33	1,644.33
Alliance	Danny Dow	5.41%	732	1,405.38	1,475.94	1,617.36	1,685.17	1,696.17
UUP	Alan Montgomery	5.67%	767	821.61	1,496.55	1,521.91	1,641.98	1,692.98
Alliance	George Thompson*	3.94%	533	937.2	963.66	1,041.39	1,110.23	1,117.23
DUP	Irene Lewis	4.93%	667	685.49	776.63	786.05	846.22	
Ind. Unionist	Samuel Walker	3.32%	449	469.64	520.46	555.74		
Workers' Party	Hugh Jordan	2.46%	333	359.23	378.97			
Electorate: 30,508 Valid: 13,534 (44.36%) Spoilt: 367 Quota: 1,692 Turnout: 13,901 (45.57%)

== 1985 Election ==
1985: 3 x UUP, 2 x DUP, 2 x Alliance

Victoria - 7 seats
Party	Candidate	FPv%	Count						
Party	Candidate	FPv%	1	2	3	4	5	6	7
DUP	Wallace Browne	22.22%	3,447						
UUP	Thomas Patton*	15.41%	2,390						
Alliance	Oliver Napier*	14.89%	2,309						
UUP	William Corry*	11.85%	1,838	1,985.4					
UUP	Dorothy Dunlop	8.80%	1,365	1,425.28	1,595.14	1,596.58	1,619.62	2,282.62	
Alliance	George Thompson	8.23%	1,278	1,289.88	1,312.68	1,457.68	1,775.92	1,844.14	1,918.01
DUP	Robin Newton	3.64%	564	1,611.64	1,636.15	1,640.03	1,644.03	1,772.26	1,910.87
DUP	Samuel Walker	7.29%	1,131	1,330.76	1,400.49	1,401.68	1,408.72	1,579.34	1,708.82
UUP	John McCrea	6.46%	1,002	1,033.68	1,175.61	1,176.61	1,186.53		
SDLP	Barry Gilheany	1.21%	188	189.76	190.33				
Electorate: 30,776 Valid: 15,512 (50.40%) Spoilt: 427 Quota: 1,940 Turnout: 15,939 (51.79%)

== See also ==
- Belfast City Council
- Electoral wards of Belfast
- Local government in Northern Ireland
- Members of Belfast City Council
- Belfast Victoria (Northern Ireland Parliament constituency)
- Belfast Victoria (UK Parliament constituency)
