= Fiona McAteer =

Alliance Party of Northern Ireland politician

High Sheriff of Belfast
- Incumbent
- Assumed office 14 January 2025
- Preceded by: Sammy Douglas

Member of Belfast City Council
- Incumbent
- Assumed office 18 May 2023
- Constituency: Titanic

Personal details
- Born: Belfast, Northern Ireland
- Party: Alliance

Fiona Elizabeth McAteer is a Northern Irish politician from the Alliance Party, serving as High Sheriff of Belfast since January 2025. She has been a Belfast City Councillor for the Titanic DEA since 2023.

== Background ==
McAteer was selected by the Alliance Party ahead of the 2023 local elections, being one of two candidates to run in Belfast's Titanic District. She was successful, being elected on the fifth count with 1,149 first-preference votes. On her election, McAteer said: "I am passionate about seeing more female representatives and young people enter politics and I am pleased to be able to play my part by running for Council. I am determined to make this area the best place to live, work and visit and I am looking forward to continuing all the hard work by former Councillor Michelle Kelly."

On January 14 2025, McAteer took office as the 125th High Sheriff of Belfast. Following her appointment, she said: “Being appointed as High Sheriff is an incredible honour, and I’m especially proud to take office alongside my party colleague Micky Murray during his tenure as Lord Mayor. It’s also exciting to be able to show the role in a new light as a young, working mother in local politics. It’s so important that women in particular feel empowered to enter public life and make their voices heard, and that comes about by having women in these positions."
