= Pauline Whitley =

Former High Sheriff of Belfast

High Sheriff of Belfast
- In office January 1984 – January 1985
- Preceded by: Donnell Deeny
- Succeeded by: Andrew Cairns

Member of Belfast City Council
- In office ?–1985

Personal details
- Born: Belfast, Northern Ireland
- Political party: Democratic Unionist Party

Pauline Whitley was a Democratic Unionist Party politician who served as High Sheriff of Belfast from January 1984 to 1985.
