= Margaret Clarke (politician) =

Former High Sheriff Belfast

High Sheriff of Belfast
- In office January 2003 – January 2004
- Preceded by: Wallace Browne
- Succeeded by: Ruth Patterson

Member of Belfast City Council
- In office 21 May 1997 – 5 May 2005
- Preceded by: Sandy Blair
- Succeeded by: Margaret McKenzie
- Constituency: Pottinger
- In office 15 May 1985 – 19 May 1993
- Preceded by: New district
- Succeeded by: Sandy Blair
- Constituency: Pottinger

Personal details
- Born: October 1940 (age 85) Belfast, Northern Ireland
- Party: Ulster Unionist
- Spouse: Jim Clarke

Margaret Clarke (born October 1940) is a former Ulster Unionist Party (UUP) politician who served as High Sheriff of Belfast from January 2003 to 2004. She was a Belfast City Councillor for the Pottinger DEA from 1997 to 2005, having previously represented the area from 1985 until 1993.

== Background ==
Clarke was elected in Belfast's Pottinger District at the 1985 local elections. She lost her seat at the 1993 Council election, though regained it in 1997.

In January 2003, Clarke was appointed High Sheriff of Belfast, becoming the seventh woman to hold office.

== Personal life ==
Clarke is married to former Belfast City Councillor Jim Clarke, who served on the council alongside her. Jim was also High Sheriff from 1998 to 1999.
