= Michael Copeland (politician) =

Former unionist MLA from Northern Ireland (born 1954)

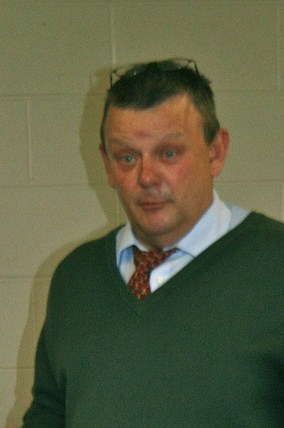

Member of the Legislative Assembly for Belfast East
- In office 5 May 2010 – 7 September 2015
- Preceded by: Sir Reg Empey
- Succeeded by: Andy Allen
- In office 26 November 2003 – 7 March 2007
- Preceded by: Ian Adamson
- Succeeded by: Wallace Browne

Deputy mayor of Castlereagh
- In office 2002–2003

Member of Castlereagh Borough Council
- In office 7 June 2001 – 22 May 2014
- Preceded by: Alan Carson
- Succeeded by: Council abolished
- Constituency: Castlereagh Central

Personal details
- Born: 23 June 1954 (age 72) Belfast, Northern Ireland
- Party: Ulster Unionist Party
- Children: Sarah and Matthew
- Education: Sandhurst
- Occupation: Politician
- Profession: Military Officer

Military service
- Allegiance: United Kingdom
- Branch/service: British Army
- Rank: Lieutenant
- Unit: Ulster Defence Regiment
- Battles/wars: The Troubles

Michael Copeland (born 23 June 1954) is a former Ulster Unionist Party (UUP) politician, who was a Member of the Northern Ireland Assembly (MLA) for East Belfast from 2003 to 2007, and then from 2010 to 2015.

Copeland was born in Belfast and was educated at Lisnasharragh Primary School, Lisnasharragh Secondary School, Castlereagh College and the Royal Military Academy Sandhurst becoming a lieutenant of the Ulster Defence Regiment, British Armed Forces.

== Political career ==
Copeland was first elected to Castlereagh Borough Council in 2001 and in May 2002 was elected Deputy Mayor of Castlereagh.

In 2002, he was elected chairman of Castlereagh District Policing Partnership. He later resigned in protest at the treatment of the RUC full-time Reserve. He also served as Director of Castlereagh Local Strategy Partnership.

After defeating incumbent MLA Ian Adamson for the East Belfast UUP nomination for the 2003 Assembly Election he was elected to the Northern Ireland Assembly. He was re-selected to stand for the constituency in the elections in 2007 but lost his seat. Copeland remains an extremely active figure in local governmental politics within Northern Ireland: maintaining a keen interest in domestic, socioeconomic and housing problems. He was re-elected to the Northern Ireland Assembly as MLA for East Belfast in the Assembly Elections in May 2011.

A member of the Orange Order and the Royal Black Institution, Copeland has served as the party's Parades spokesman.

He stepped down from the Assembly for health reasons was replaced by Andy Allen.

== Views ==
Copeland has spoken in favour of same-sex marriage, saying he "backed the change."

== Personal ==
His wife Sonia was elected to Belfast City Council in the 2014 Northern Ireland local elections. She represents the Titanic ward. They have two children and he is a member of the Church of Ireland.

Northern Ireland Assembly
Preceded by Ian Adamson	MLA for Belfast East; 2003 – 2007	Succeeded by Wallace Browne
Preceded by Reg Empey	MLA for Belfast East; 2011–2015	Succeeded by Andy Allen
