= Donnell Deeny =

High Sheriff of Belfast
- In office January 1983 – January 1984
- Preceded by: Alfie Ferguson
- Succeeded by: Pauline Whitley

Member of Belfast City Council
- In office 20 May 1981 – 15 May 1985
- Preceded by: Basil Glass
- Succeeded by: District abolished
- Constituency: Belfast Area A

Personal details
- Born: April 25, 1950 (age 76) Lurgan, Northern Ireland
- Party: Alliance

Sir Donnell Justin Patrick Deeny PC DL, KC, SC (born 25 April 1950), styled as the Rt Hon Sir Donnell Deeny, is a mediator and arbitrator (ACIArb) and a former member of the Court of Appeal of Northern Ireland. Sir Donnell is also member of the Court of Arbitration for Art at The Hague.

== Education ==
Born in Lurgan, Northern Ireland, Deeny was educated at Clongowes Wood College, Trinity College Dublin, and Queen's University, Belfast. During his time in Trinity College he acted as Auditor of the College Historical Society, the oldest undergraduate debating society in the world. He graduated in 1973.

== Career ==
Deeny was called to the Bar of Northern Ireland in 1974 and took silk in March 1989. He was also called to the Bar of Ireland (Senior Counsel 1996), and to the Bar of England and Wales (as a bencher in the Middle Temple). Deeny was appointed a High Court judge on 6 September 2004, and was knighted some months afterwards. He was appointed as a Lord Justice of Appeal in September 2017 and a Privy Councillor in October 2017.

He was appointed in 2000 to the British Government's Spoliation Advisory Panel, which advises on claims relating to cultural objects lost during the Nazi era. He served two further terms before becoming chairman of the Panel in 2012.

Deeny had served as an Alliance Party Councillor on Belfast City Council in 1981–85, and was High Sheriff of Belfast in 1983, the first Catholic to hold office in the City since the Partition of Ireland.

Deeny was a member of the Arts Council of Northern Ireland in 1991–94, and its chairman 1994–98. He was President of the Ulster Architectural Heritage Society in 2006 to 2017; and president of the Irish Legal History Society in 2015- 2018; and the founding chairman, Ireland Chair of Poetry Trust in 1997–2008. He is a Deputy Lieutenant for the City of Belfast and an Honorary Member of the Royal Town Planning Institute.

He was elected as the 56th Pro-Chancellor of the University of Dublin in 2014. He retired from this role in 2025 and was awarded an honorary degree from the University in recognition of his service and distinguished legal career. The citation noted among other attributes "we cannot imagine anyone who would provide better judgement, legal and ethical expertise than this superb champion of justice....and formidable orator."

He also was awarded an Honorary Degree as Doctor of Laws for his exceptional public service by Queen's University Belfast in 2022.

Civic offices
Preceded by Alfie Ferguson	High Sheriff of Belfast; 1983	Succeeded by Pauline Whitley
