= May Campbell (politician) =

Former High Sheriff of Belfast

High Sheriff of Belfast
- In office 12 January 2012 – 21 January 2013
- Preceded by: Ian Adamson
- Succeeded by: Brian Kingston

Member of Belfast City Council
- In office 5 May 2005 – 22 May 2014
- Preceded by: Harry Toan
- Succeeded by: District abolished
- Constituency: Pottinger

Personal details
- Born: April 1937; Belfast, Northern Ireland
- Died: 2 November 2021
- Political party: Democratic Unionist Party

May Campbell (April 1937 - 2 November 2021) was a Democratic Unionist Party (DUP) politician who was High Sheriff of Belfast between January 2012 and January 2013. She served as a Belfast City Councillor for the Pottinger DEA from 2005 to 2014.

== Background ==
At the 2005 local elections, Campbell was elected onto Belfast City Council for the Pottinger District. She was re-elected to the council in 2011.

In January 2012, Campbell was made High Sheriff of Belfast.
