= Wallace Browne, Baron Browne of Belmont =

British politician

The Right Honourable The Lord Browne of Belmont
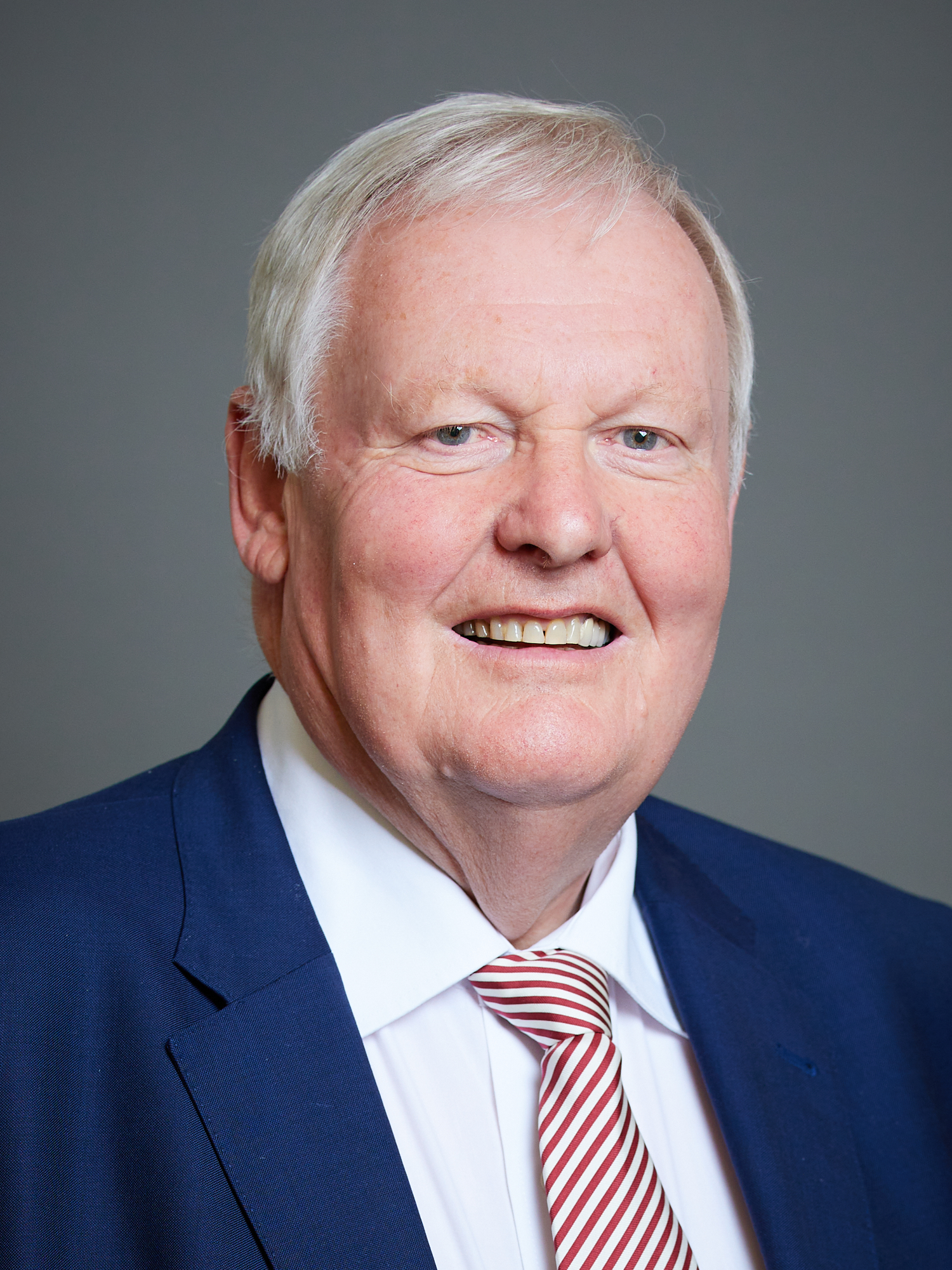
- Official portrait, 2022

Member of the House of Lords
- Lord Temporal
- Life peerage 12 June 2006

Member of the Northern Ireland Assembly for Belfast East
- In office 7 March 2007 – 24 March 2011
- Preceded by: Michael Copeland
- Succeeded by: Sammy Douglas

62nd Lord Mayor of Belfast
- In office 1 June 2005 – 1 June 2006
- Preceded by: Tom Ekin
- Succeeded by: Patrick McCarthy

High Sheriff of Belfast
- In office January 2002 – January 2003
- Preceded by: Alan Crowe
- Succeeded by: Margaret Clarke

Member of Belfast City Council
- In office 15 May 1985 – 5 May 2011
- Preceded by: District created
- Succeeded by: John Hussey
- Constituency: Victoria

Personal details
- Born: 29 October 1947 (age 79) Belfast, Northern Ireland
- Party: Democratic Unionist Party
- Education: Queen's University Belfast

Wallace Hamilton Browne, Baron Browne of Belmont (born 29 October 1947), is a Democratic Unionist Party (DUP) politician, who has been a Member of the House of Lords since 2006, and was a Member of the Northern Ireland Assembly (MLA) for East Belfast from 2007 to 2011.

== Political career ==
Browne, a long-serving member of the DUP Central Executive; was a member of Belfast City Council for the Victoria electoral area from 1985 until 2010.

During his time on Belfast City Council, Browne was High Sheriff of the City in 2002 and Lord Mayor of Belfast in 2005–06.

In 2007, Browne was elected in the Assembly elections for the East Belfast seat. He remained a member of the Northern Ireland Assembly until 2011. During his time in the Assembly, he represented his party on various committees, including the Justice Committee, Culture and Arts Committee and the Audit Committee. Browne also served as chairman of the Assembly Procedures Committee.

Since 2006, he has served in the House of Lords. He was one of the first three members of the DUP to be introduced to the second chamber as a life peer, giving the party its first-ever representation in the House of Lords. The other two being Maurice Morrow, the chairman of the DUP, and Eileen Paisley, the wife of the late Leader of the DUP, Ian Paisley; all became "working" life peers. Browne was raised to the peerage as Baron Browne of Belmont, of Belmont in County Antrim on 12 June 2006.

Browne has been an active working peer during his time in the House of Lords, regularly contributing to debates on a range of issues including: Restoration of the Devolved Institutions in Northern Ireland, Armed Forces Veterans, Military Brexit, Historical Abuse and Gambling. In 2017, Browne secured the first focused debate in the House of Lords on the issue of online gambling.

=== Damage to Belfast City Hall portrait ===
On 19 October 2024, Browne's portrait in Belfast City Hall was removed from a wall and the glass in its frame smashed during an event to celebrate an Irish language group’s 20th anniversary. A Sinn Féin Assembly employee resigned after admitting involvement in the incident. It subsequently came to light that the individual is the son of a sitting Sinn Féin MLA.

In a statement, a Sinn Féin spokesperson said:

“Today, 21 October, a Sinn Féin employee, who works in the assembly, made the party chief whip aware of their involvement in an incident regarding a portrait in Belfast City Hall which took place on Saturday 19 October. The employee was immediately suspended, and we have notified the PSNI today. The employee has now resigned from their employment and their party membership.”

The Police Service of Northern Ireland (PSNI) is treating damage caused to the portrait as a hate crime. It was painted by artist Zohar Arnon, who grew up in Israel. In a social media post, DUP leader Gavin Robinson said: “We don’t know if the motivation was sectarian bigotry, antisemitism, wanton destruction or a heady mix of the three … but [it’s] a disgrace.” Belfast City Council said it was "assessing the extent of the damage and looking into the circumstances".

== Personal life ==
Before he was elected as a member of the NI Assembly in 2007, Browne was previously a grammar school teacher. Browne was also a long-serving trustee of the Somme Association. Browne, a former pupil of Campbell College, Belfast is a graduate of Queen's University, Belfast graduating in 1970 with a degree in zoology

== See also ==
- List of Northern Ireland Members of the House of Lords

Civic offices
Preceded by Alan Crowe	High Sheriff of Belfast; 2002–2003	Succeeded by Margaret Clarke
Preceded by Tom Ekin	Lord Mayor of Belfast; 2005–06	Succeeded by Patrick McCarthy
Northern Ireland Assembly
Preceded by Michael Copeland	MLA for Belfast East; 2007–2011	Succeeded by Sammy Douglas
Orders of precedence in the United Kingdom
Preceded by The Lord Bradley	Gentlemen; Baron Browne of Belmont	Followed by The Lord Low of Dalston
