= Ian Adamson =

British politician (1944–2019)

Ian Adamson OBE

High Sheriff of Belfast
- In office January 2011 – January 2012
- Preceded by: Christopher Stalford
- Succeeded by: May Campbell

Lord Mayor of Belfast
- In office June 1996 – June 1997
- Deputy: Margaret Crooks
- Preceded by: Eric Smyth
- Succeeded by: Alban Maginness

Deputy Lord Mayor of Belfast
- In office June 1994 – June 1995
- Preceded by: Hugh Smyth
- Succeeded by: Alasdair McDonnell

Member of Belfast City Council
- In office 17 May 1989 – 5 May 2011
- Preceded by: William Corry
- Succeeded by: Andrew Webb
- Constituency: Victoria

Member of the Northern Ireland Assembly for Belfast East
- In office 25 June 1998 – 26 November 2003
- Preceded by: New Creation
- Succeeded by: Michael Copeland

Personal details
- Born: 28 June 1944 Bangor, County Down, Northern Ireland
- Died: 9 January 2019 (aged 74) Conlig, County Down, Northern Ireland
- Party: Ulster Unionist Party
- Education: Queen's University Belfast
- Profession: Paediatrician

Ian Adamson OBE (28 June 1944 – 9 January 2019) was an Ulster Unionist Party (UUP) politician and paediatrician, who was the Lord Mayor of Belfast from 1996 to 1997, having been Deputy Lord Mayor from 1994 to 1995.

He additionally served as a Belfast City Councillor for the Victoria DEA from 1989 to 2011

Adamson was a Member of the Northern Ireland Assembly (MLA) for East Belfast from 1998 to 2003.

== Early life ==
Adamson was born in 1944 in Bangor, County Down and raised in the nearby village of Conlig.

== Career ==
He was an Ulster Unionist member of Belfast City Council from 1989, becoming that party's first honorary historian, until his retirement from active politics in 2011.

Adamson served as Deputy Lord Mayor in 1994–95 and then Lord Mayor of Belfast in 1996–97. He was awarded the Order of the British Empire in 1998 for services to local government. He was an MLA for Belfast East from 1998 until 2003. He was also personal physician and advisor on history and culture to Rev. Ian Paisley (First Minister of Northern Ireland 2007–08) from 2004 until the latter's death in 2014.

He was the leading advocate of a version of the prehistory of Ireland based on the theory of the Cruthin.

On 18 July 1978, he was accepted as a Member of the International Medical Association of Lourdes for services to the disabled children and young people of the Falls parish in Belfast. He had a special interest in the long-term unemployed and became the founder secretary of Farset Youth and Community Development in 1981.

In 1989, he became founder Chairman of the Somme Association based at Craigavon House, Circular Road, Belfast, under the auspices of Her Royal Highness Princess Alice, Duchess of Gloucester; he also established the Somme Heritage Centre, now Museum, at Conlig, in 1994.

He founded the Ullans Academy, of which he served as President, followed by the Ulster-Scots Language Society in 1992. He became the first Rector and founder Chairman of the Ulster Scots Academy in 1994. He was a founder member of the Cultural Traditions Group, the Northern Ireland Community Relations Council and the Ultach Trust, and served as a member of the Ulster-Scots Agency, 2003-12. He was President of the Belfast Civic Trust.

Adamson was a specialist in community child health (community paediatrics), being a member of the Faculty of Community Health, and was awarded the fellowship of the Royal Institute of Public Health for his services to the health of young people in 1998. He was awarded a special commendation by His Royal Highness The Prince of Wales. He was an Executive Board Member of the London-based Association of Port Health Authorities, 2005–11 (Chairman of the Border Inspection Post Committee, 2005–06 and Imported Food Committee, 2006–11). Vice-President of the Somme Association, Adamson was a member of the boards of many other local public sector and voluntary civic organisations.

In his later years, he became a patron of the Dalaradia Group. Based in Newtownabbey they slowly evolved from the peace process as a vehicle for working class loyalists in County Antrim, many of whom were ex-combatants, to engage in the transformation of their communities after the troubles.

On his website, Adamson described himself as "a British Unionist, an Irish Royalist and an Ulster Loyalist". After Adamson's death on 9 January 2019, his funeral was attended by President of Ireland Michael D Higgins, whom he described as a friend. Van Morrison also attended the funeral, playing Adamson's favourite song.

== Promotion of pseudo-history ==
In his 1974 book, Cruthin: The Ancient Kindred, Adamson proposed that the Cruthin were a British people who spoke a non-Celtic language and were the original inhabitants of Ulster. He argues that they were at war with the Irish Gaels for centuries, seeing the story of the Táin Bó Cúailnge as representing this; and argues that most of the Cruthin were driven to Scotland after the Battle of Moira (637), only for their descendants to return 1,000 years later in the Plantation of Ulster. Adamson's suggestion is that the Gaelic Irish are not really native to Ulster, and that the Ulster Scots have merely returned to their ancient lands. His theory has been adopted by some Ulster loyalists and Ulster Scots activists to counter Irish nationalism, and was promoted by elements in the Ulster Defence Association (UDA). They saw this new 'origin myth' as "a justification for their presence in Ireland and for partition of the country". Adamson said his theory offers "the hope of uniting the Ulster people at last".

Historians, archaeologists and anthropologists have widely rejected Adamson's theory. Prof. Stephen Howe of the University of Bristol argues it was designed to provide ancient underpinnings for a militantly separate Ulster identity. Historian Peter Berresford Ellis likens it to Zionism. Archaeologists such as J. P. Mallory and T. E. McNeil note that the Cruthin are "archaeologically invisible"; there is no evidence of them being a distinct group and "there is not a single object or site that an archaeologist can declare to be distinctly Cruthin".

== Works ==
=== Books ===
- The Cruthin: A History of the Ulster Land and People, (Newtownards: Nosmada Books 1974, 2nd edn. Bangor: Donard Publishing Co. 1978, 3rd edn. Bangor: Pretani Press 1986, 5th imp 1995); ISBN 0-9503461-0-1, 4th edn Newtownards: Colourpoint Books, an imprint of Colourpoint Creative Ltd, 2014); ISBN 978-1-78073-066-0
- Bangor, Light of the world, (Bangor: Fairview Press 1979, 2nd edn. Belfast: Pretani Press 1987); ISBN 0-948868-06-6, 3rd edn. Newtownards: Colourpoint Books, 2015) ISBN 978-1-78073-093-6
- The Battle of Moira, [ed.] Sir Samuel Ferguson, Congal (Newtownards: Nosmada Books 1980) Introduction by Dr Ian Adamson OBE
- The Identity of Ulster: The Land, the Language and the People, (Belfast : Pretani Press 1982, 2nd edn. 1987, 5th imp. 1995); ISBN 0-948868-04-X
- The Ulster People: Ancient, Medieval and Modern, (Bangor: Pretani Press 1991) ISBN 0-948868-13-9
- William and the Boyne, (Newtownards: Pretani Press, 1995); ISBN 0-948868-20-1
- Dalaradia, Kingdom of the Cruthin, (Belfast: Pretani Press 1998); ISBN 0-948868-26-0/ISBN 0-948868-25-2
- Bombs on Belfast: The Blitz 1941 (Newtownards: Colourpoint Books in association with Belfast Telegraph 2011 (1st published Belfast: Pretani Press 1984); ISBN 978-1-906578-91-6
- The Bangor Book, 2016, ed Kenneth Irvine, (Ards and North Down Borough Council) Translations from Mediæval Latin by Dr Ian Adamson OBE; ISBN 978-1-5272-0103-3

=== Papers ===
- The Ullans Academy in Legislation, Literature and Sociolinguistics: Northern Ireland, the Republic of Ireland, and Scotland, edited by John Kirk and Dónall P. Ó Baoill (Belfast: Queen's University 2005); ISBN 0-85389-874-X
- The Ulster-Scots Movement (edited by Wesley Hutchinson and Clíona Ni Ríordáin), Brussels: P.I.E. Peter Lang 2010; ISBN 978-90-5201-649-8
- Somme Memories in Towards Commemoration: Ireland in war and revolution, 1912–1923, edited by John Horne and Edward Madigan (Dublin, Royal Irish Academy 2013); ISBN 978-1-908996-17-6
- Common Identity in Ulster-Scots in Northern Ireland Today: Language, Culture Community L'Ulster-Scots en Irelande du Nord aujourd’hui: langue, culture, communauté compiled by Wesley Hutchinson (Rennes, Presses Universitaires 2014); ISBN 978-2-7535-2887-1.

Northern Ireland Assembly
New assembly	MLA for Belfast East; 1998–2003	Succeeded by Michael Copeland
Civic offices
Preceded by Hugh Smyth	Deputy Lord Mayor of Belfast; 1994–1995	Succeeded by Alasdair McDonnell
Preceded by Eric Smyth	Lord Mayor of Belfast; 1996–97	Succeeded by Alban Maginness
Preceded by Christopher Stalford	High Sheriff of Belfast; 2011	Succeeded by May Campbell
