= Sammy Douglas =

Northern Irish politician (born 1953)

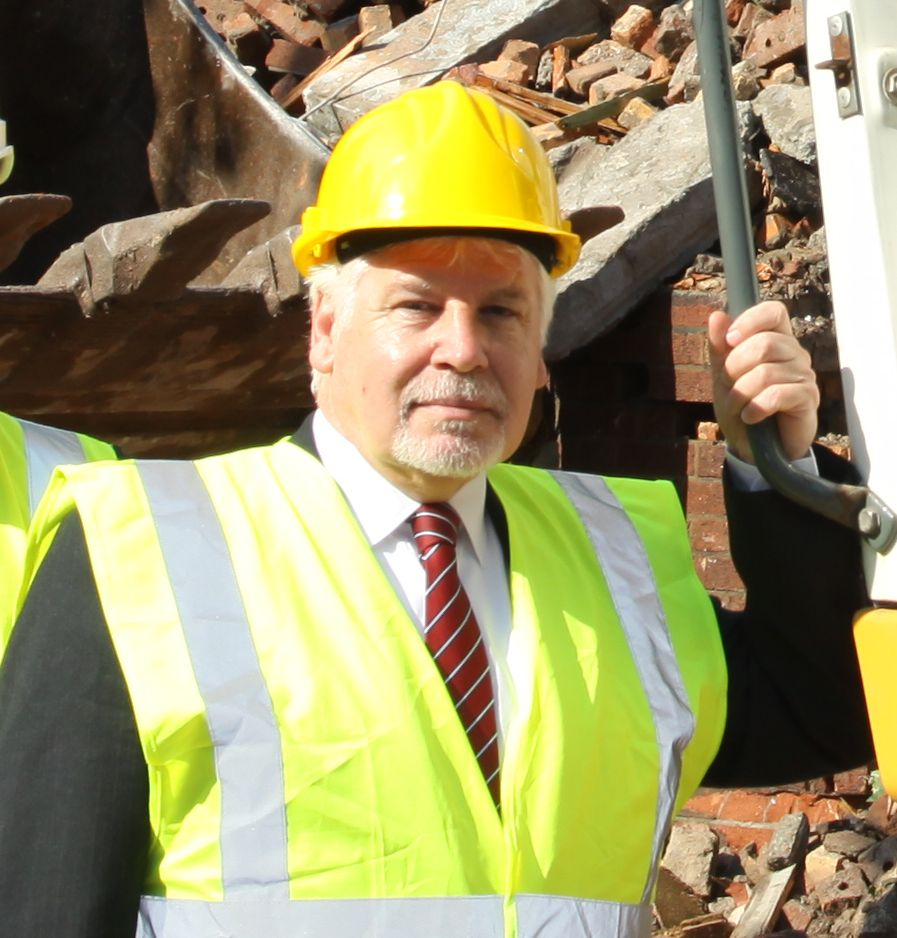

High Sheriff of Belfast
- In office January 2024 – 14 January 2025
- Preceded by: John Kyle
- Succeeded by: Fiona McAteer

Member of Belfast City Council
- Incumbent
- Assumed office 18 May 2023
- Preceded by: George Dorrian
- Constituency: Titanic
- In office 2 June 2022 – 18 May 2023
- Preceded by: David Brooks
- Succeeded by: Davy Douglas
- Constituency: Lisnasharragh

Member of the Northern Ireland Assembly for Belfast East
- In office 5 May 2011 – 2 March 2017
- Preceded by: Wallace Browne
- Succeeded by: Seat abolished

Personal details
- Born: 22 February 1953 (age 73) Sandy Row, Belfast, Northern Ireland
- Party: Democratic Unionist Party

Sammy Douglas (born 22 February 1953) is a Democratic Unionist Party (DUP) politician and community worker who was the High Sheriff of Belfast from January 2024 to 2025, and a Belfast City Councillor for the Titanic DEA since 2023. Douglas was previously a Member of the Northern Ireland Assembly (MLA) for Belfast East from 2011 to 2017.

== Career ==
Douglas was first elected to the Northern Ireland Assembly at the 2011 election, representing Belfast East. He retained his seat at the 2016 Assembly election. In January 2017, Douglas said that he would not be seeking re-election at the March 2017 Assembly election.

Douglas returned to front-line politics in June 2022, being co-opted onto Belfast City Council to replace Lisnasharragh representative David Brooks, following his election to the Assembly. He was re-elected at the 2023 local elections, this time for the Titanic District.

In January 2024, Douglas was appointed High Sheriff of Belfast.

Northern Ireland Assembly
Preceded by Wallace Browne	MLA for Belfast East; 2011–2017	Seat abolished
