= 2023 Belfast City Council election =

Local election in Northern Ireland

- 18 May 2023

All 60 council seats 31 seats needed for a majority
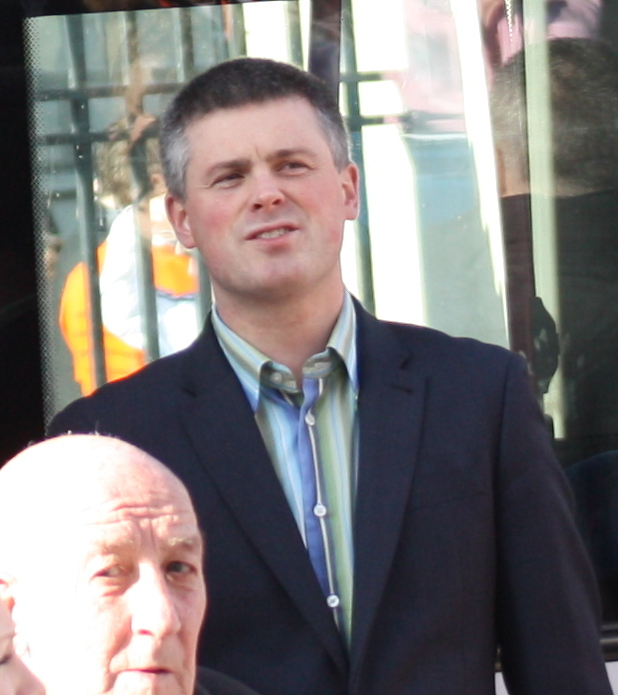

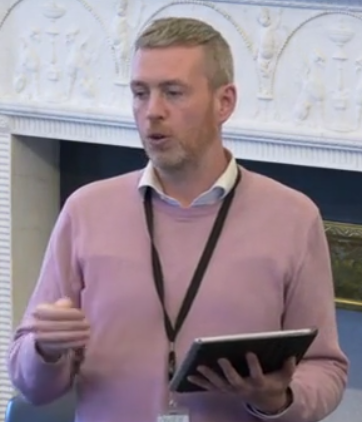
	First party	Second party	Third party
Leader	Ciaran Beattie	George Dorrian	Michael Long
Party	Sinn Féin	DUP	Alliance
Leader's seat	Black Mountain	Titanic (defeated)	Lisnasharragh
Last election	18 seats, 28.2%	15 seats, 21.6%	10 seats, 15.7%
Seats won	22	14	11
Seat change	▲4	▼1	▲1
Popular vote	44,202	26,621	19,841
Percentage	35.2%	21.2%	15.9%
Swing	▲7.0%	▼0.4%	▲0.2%
	Fourth party	Fifth party	Sixth party
Leader	Carl Whyte	Mal O'Hara	Sonia Copeland
Party	SDLP	Green (NI)	UUP
Leader's seat	Castle	Castle (defeated )	Titanic
Last election	6 seats, 9.1%	4 seats, 6.0%	2 seats, 6.2%
Seats won	5	3	2
Seat change	▼1	▼1	Steady
Popular vote	9,690	5,965	5,123
Percentage	7.8%	4.8%	4.1%
Swing	▼1.3%	▼1.2%	▼2.1%
	Seventh party	Eighth party	Ninth party
Leader	Matt Collins	Ron McDowell	Billy Hutchinson
Party	People Before Profit	TUV	PUP
Leader's seat	Black Mountain (defeated)	Court	Court (defeated)
Last election	3 seats, 5.2%	0 seats, 0.3%	2 seats, 3.1%
Seats won	1	1	0
Seat change	▼2	▲1	▼2
Popular vote	4,492	3,482	679
Percentage	3.6%	2.8%	0.5%
Swing	▼1.6%	▲2.5%	▼2.6%
- First preference vote and seat totals by local electoral area. As this is a STV election, seat totals are determined by popular vote and preferences in each district electoral area.
Council control before election
No overall control
Council control after election
No overall control

The 2023 election to Belfast City Council was held on 18 May 2023, alongside other local elections in Northern Ireland, two weeks after local elections in England. The Northern Ireland elections were delayed by 2 weeks to avoid overlapping with the coronation of King Charles III.

Voters returned 60 members to the council via single transferable vote. Typical for Northern Ireland, the council remained with no overall control but Sinn Féin remained the single largest party, but fell short of a majority despite a net gain of 4 seats.

== Election results ==
2023 Belfast local election result
Party	Seats	Gains	Losses	Net gain/loss	Seats %	Votes %	Votes	+/−
Sinn Féin	22	4	0	▲4	36.67	35.39	44,202	▲7.24
DUP	14	0	1	▼1	23.33	21.31	26,621	▼0.24
Alliance	11	1	0	▲1	18.33	15.88	19,841	▲0.21
SDLP	5	1	2	▼1	8.33	7.76	9,690	▼1.30
Green (NI)	3	0	1	▼1	5.00	4.78	5,965	▼1.23
UUP	2	0	0	0	3.33	4.10	5,123	▼2.09
People Before Profit	1	0	2	▼2	1.67	3.60	4,492	▼1.62
TUV	1	1	0	▲1	1.67	2.79	3,482	▲2.49
Independent	1	1	0	▲1	1.67	1.84	2,299	▼0.01
Aontú	0	0	0	0	0.00	0.86	1,069	▼0.40
Irish Republican Socialist	0	0	0	0	0.00	0.66	825	▲0.66
PUP	0	0	2	▼2	0.00	0.54	679	▼2.52
Workers' Party	0	0	0	0	0.00	0.46	574	▼0.23
NI Conservatives	0	0	0	0	0.00	0.04	52	▲0.04
Total	60						124,914	

Note: "Votes" are the first preference votes.

== Districts summary ==
Results of the 2023 Belfast City Council election by district
District Electoral Area (DEA)	%	Cllrs	%	Cllrs	%	Cllrs	%	Cllrs	%	Cllrs	%	Cllrs	%	Cllrs	%	Cllrs	%	Cllrs	Total cllrs
District Electoral Area (DEA)	Sinn Féin		DUP		Alliance		SDLP		Green		UUP		PBP		TUV		Independents and others		Total cllrs
Balmoral	24.08	1	22.78	1 ▼1	25.54	2 ▲1	18.96	1	3.26	0	5.39	0	0.00	0	0.00	0	0.00	0	5
Black Mountain	72.52	6	0.00	0	1.04	0	10.55	1 ▲1	0.43	0	0.00	0	8.24	0 ▼1	0.00	0	7.23	0	7
Botanic	24.36	1	19.08	1	17.12	1	17.76	1	9.50	1	3.59	0	2.91	0	2.95	0	2.74	0	5
Castle	36.96	2 ▲1	28.02	2	11.31	1	8.51	1	7.96	0 ▼1	4.50	0	2.03	0	0.00	0	0.70	0	6
Collin	71.64	5 ▲1	0.00	0	3.52	0	6.47	0 ▼1	1.63	0	0.00	0	8.54	1	0.00	0	8.19	0	6
Court	28.59	2	45.09	3	2.74	0	1.46	0	0.90	0	0.00	0	3.39	0	8.01	1 ▲	9.83	0 ▼1	6
Lisnasharragh	10.28	0	26.24	2	29.03	2	13.19	1	9.66	1	6.85	0	1.67	0	3.07	0	0.00	0	6
Oldpark	50.53	4 ▲1	17.64	1	3.66	0	1.98	0 ▼1	1.20	0	0.00	0	5.66	0 ▼1	4.81	0	14.50	1 ▲1	6
Ormiston	1.22	0	28.24	2	44.27	3	0.74	0	6.99	1	12.95	1	0.82	0	4.76	0	0.00	0	7
Titanic	12.90	1 ▲1	35.79	2	25.20	2	1.30	0	9.42	0	9.72	1	0.00	0	5.67	0	0.00	0 ▼1	6
Total	35.39	22 ▲4	21.31	14 ▼1	15.88	11 ▲1	7.76	5 ▼1	4.78	3 ▼1	4.10	2	3.60	1 ▼2	2.79	1 ▲1	4.40	1 ▼1	60

== District results ==
=== Balmoral ===
2019: 2 x DUP, 1 x SDLP, 1 x Alliance, 1 x Sinn Féin

2023: 2 x Alliance, 1 x DUP, 1 x SDLP, 1 x Sinn Féin

2019–2023 Change: Alliance gain from DUP

Balmoral - 5 seats
Party	Candidate	FPv%	Count						
Party	Candidate	FPv%	1	2	3	4	5	6	7
Sinn Féin	Geraldine McAteer* †	19.91%	2,037						
SDLP	Donal Lyons*	15.80%	1,616	1,641.28	1,894.28				
Alliance	Tara Brooks	14.88%	1,522	1,530.64	1,555.28	1,729.28			
DUP	Sarah Bunting*	14.79%	1,513	1,513.32	1,514.32	1,523.32	1,524.98	1,722.98	
Alliance	Micky Murray*	10.66%	1,090	1,096.72	1,121.16	1,197.16	1,324.15	1,501.12	1,788.12
DUP	Gareth Spratt*	7.99%	817	817	818	825	825	940	941
Sinn Féin	Seán Napier	4.17%	427	699.80	716.72	755	806.46	809.46	
UUP	Joshua Lowry	5.39%	551	551.16	554.16	567.16	574.63		
Green (NI)	Lauren Kendall	3.26%	333	334.60	340.08				
SDLP	Sarah Mulgrew	3.16%	323	332.12					
Electorate: 18,691 Valid: 10,229 (54.73%) Spoilt: 147 Quota: 1,705 Turnout: 10,376 (55.51%)

=== Black Mountain ===
2019: 6 x Sinn Féin, 1 x People Before Profit

2023: 6 x Sinn Féin, 1 x SDLP

2019–2023 Change: SDLP gain from People Before Profit

Black Mountain - 7 seats
Party	Candidate	FPv%	Count							
Party	Candidate	FPv%	1	2	3	4	5	6	7	8
Sinn Féin	Ciarán Beattie*	14.63%	2,336							
Sinn Féin	Michael Donnelly*	13.51%	2,158							
Sinn Féin	Arder Carson*	12.98%	2,073							
Sinn Féin	Ronan McLaughlin*	10.27%	1,641	1,867.24	1,983.65	1,986.65	2,037.59			
SDLP	Paul Doherty ‡	10.55%	1,685	1,700.96	1,706.77	1,718.05	1,720.72	1,838.15	2,029.15	
Sinn Féin	Áine McCabe*	11.51%	1,838	1,848.50	1,853.12	1,860.40	1,862.65	1,897.79	2,005.79	
Sinn Féin	Róis-Máire Donnelly*	9.62%	1,536	1,575.06	1,589.29	1,594.27	1,597.66	1,643.84	1,730.09	1,762.61
People Before Profit	Matt Collins*	8.24%	1,316	1,330.14	1,334.13	1,353.13	1,354.57	1,446.13	1,660.80	1,661.40
Aontú	Gerard Herdman	3.40%	543	544.96	545.66	547.66	547.90	563.18		
Irish Republican Socialist	Dan Murphy	2.67%	426	429.78	431.53	432.53	432.71	454.51		
Workers' Party	Ursula Meighan	1.16%	185	186.82	188.36	188.36	188.54			
Alliance	Ryan Brown	1.04%	166	171.04	171.39	185.53	185.86			
Green (NI)	Stevie Maginn	0.43%	68	68.70	68.77					
Electorate: 27,143 Valid: 15,971 (58.84%) Spoilt: 309 Quota: 1,997 Turnout: 16,280 (59.98%)

=== Botanic ===
2019: 1 x DUP, 1 x Alliance, 1 x Sinn Féin, 1 x Green, 1 x SDLP

2023: 1 x Sinn Féin, 1 x DUP, 1 x SDLP, 1 x Alliance, 1 x Green

2019–2023 Change: No change

Botanic - 5 seats
Party	Candidate	FPv%	Count								
Party	Candidate	FPv%	1	2	3	4	5	6	7	8	9
SDLP	Gary McKeown*	17.76%	1,881								
DUP	Tracy Kelly*	12.95%	1,372	1,372.42	1,382.48	1,525.54	1,529.54	1,717.90	2,342.90		
Alliance	Emmet McDonough-Brown*	10.25%	1,086	1,118.94	1,144.48	1,150.48	1,182.02	1,263.56	1,275.62	1,298.62	1,951.62
Sinn Féin	John Gormley* †	14.47%	1,533	1,543.80	1,560.22	1,562.22	1,584.28	1,587.34	1,588.46	1,591.46	1,602.18
Green (NI)	Áine Groogan*	9.50%	1,006	1,023.88	1,080.66	1,089.72	1,299.68	1,343.16	1,355.16	1,394.16	1,544.34
Sinn Féin	Emma-Jane Faulkner	9.89%	1,048	1,061.08	1,081.44	1,087.50	1,127.86	1,132.92	1,135.92	1,135.92	1,157.06
Alliance	Chris Ogle	6.87%	728	754.76	768.42	772.42	821.90	880.44	895.50	912.50	
DUP	Darren Leighton	6.13%	649	649.24	656.30	708.30	709.36	765.36			
UUP	Jeffrey Dudgeon	3.59%	380	381.98	399.16	477.28	484.34				
People Before Profit	Sipho Sibanda	2.91%	308	310.58	406.88	408.88					
TUV	Billy Dickson	2.95%	312	312.30	316.36						
Socialist Party	Neil Moore	1.41%	149	150.68							
Workers' Party	Paddy Lynn	0.84%	89	90.62							
NI Conservatives	Idris Maiga	0.49%	52	52.66							
Electorate: 23,049 Valid: 10,593 (45.96%) Spoilt: 162 Quota: 1,766 Turnout: 10,755 (46.66%)

=== Castle ===
2019: 2 x DUP, 1 x Sinn Féin, 1 x Alliance, 1 x SDLP, 1 x Green

2023: 2 x Sinn Féin, 2 x DUP, 1 x Alliance, 1 x SDLP

2019–2023 Change: Sinn Féin gain from Green

Castle - 6 seats
Party	Candidate	FPv%	Count				
Party	Candidate	FPv%	1	2	3	4	5
Sinn Féin	Brónach Anglin	20.15%	2,479				
Sinn Féin	Conor Maskey* †	16.81%	2,068				
DUP	Fred Cobain*	14.43%	1,775				
DUP	Dean McCullough*	13.59%	1,671	1,673.31	1,673.85	2,021.85	
Alliance	Sam Nelson*	11.31%	1,392	1,546.11	1,590.03	1,772.03	
SDLP	Carl Whyte*	8.51%	1,047	1,378.98	1,511.28	1,608.53	1,628.53
Green (NI)	Mal O'Hara*	7.96%	979	1,137.73	1,225.75	1,474.88	1,553.88
UUP	Julie-Anne Corr-Johnston	4.50%	553	555.64	556.72		
People Before Profit	Barney Doherty	2.03%	250	300.16	327.16		
Workers' Party	Lily Kerr	0.70%	86	102.17	111.17		
Electorate: 23,442 Valid: 12,479 (53.23%) Spoilt: 179 Quota: 1,758 Turnout: 12,300 (52.47%)

=== Collin ===
2019: 4 x Sinn Féin, 1 x People Before Profit, 1 x SDLP

2023: 5 x Sinn Féin, 1 x People Before Profit

2019–2023 Change: Sinn Féin gain from SDLP

Collin - 6 seats
Party	Candidate	FPv%	Count											
Party	Candidate	FPv%	1	2	3	4	5	6	7	8	9	10	11	12
Sinn Féin	Joe Duffy*	18.33%	2,559											
Sinn Féin	Caoimhín McCann*	16.83%	2,350											
Sinn Féin	Matt Garrett*	13.78%	1,924	2,029.82										
Sinn Féin	Séanna Walsh*	10.89%	1,521	1,910.62	2,186.77									
Sinn Féin	Clíodhna Nic Bhranair †	11.81%	1,649	1,671.44	1,700.54	1,880.34	1,892.34	1,900.68	1,923.04	2,024.04				
People Before Profit	Michael Collins*	8.54%	1,193	1,208.40	1,219.95	1,220.95	1,250.55	1,271.55	1,338.14	1,469.95	1,479.69	1,481.45	1,581.67	1,730.09
SDLP	Gerard McDonald	6.47%	903	913.12	921.97	922.67	931.19	938.71	985.23	1,018.63	1,034.08	1,034.52	1,181.96	1,520.65
Alliance	Eoin Millar	3.52%	492	496.84	498.94	499.24	504.24	518.24	588.46	617.06	622.01	622.89	647.41	
Aontú	Luke McCann	3.77%	526	529.52	531.92	532.12	537.34	566.34	576.34	594.56	597.11	597.77		
Independent	Julieann McNally	2.64%	368	371.96	384.86	385.36	390.36	425.80	448.32					
Green (NI)	Ash Jones	1.63%	228	230.64	232.29	232.59	238.81	260.81						
Independent	Tony Mallon	1.19%	166	166.66	167.26	167.36	169.36							
Workers' Party	Paddy Crossan	0.59%	83	84.32	86.12	86.12								
Electorate: 24,938 Valid: 13,962 (55.99%) Spoilt: 255 Quota: 1,996 Turnout: 14,217 (57.01%)

=== Court ===
2019: 3 x DUP, 2 x Sinn Féin, 1 x PUP

2023: 3 x DUP, 2 x Sinn Féin, 1 x TUV

2019–2023 Change: TUV gain from PUP

Court - 6 seats
Party	Candidate	FPv%	Count										
Party	Candidate	FPv%	1	2	3	4	5	6	7	8	9	10	11
DUP	Frank McCoubrey*	22.00%	2,645										
Sinn Féin	Tina Black*	15.15%	1,822										
DUP	Nicola Verner*	14.83%	1,783										
Sinn Féin	Claire Canavan*	13.44%	1,616	1,616.70	1,697.65	1,698.65	1,698.74	1,712.04	1,780.04				
DUP	Ian McLaughlin	8.26%	993	1,656.25	1,656.25	1,661.30	1,702.37	1,703.40	1,705.46	1,705.46	1,705.46	1,720.5	
TUV	Ron McDowell	8.01%	963	1,090.40	1,090.50	1,093.50	1,098.73	1,098.73	1,101.7	1,101.7	1,104.73	1,130.85	1,156.85
PUP	Billy Hutchinson*	5.65%	679	789.25	789.35	790.35	795.63	795.63	801.07	803.07	803.07	853.92	906.27
People Before Profit	Cailín McCaffery	3.39%	408	409.05	411.40	411.40	411.52	436.62	500.92	509.92	631.27	807.62	
Alliance	Ally Haydock	2.74%	329	333.20	333.80	336.80	337.43	337.48	440.33	465.33	477.43		
Irish Republican Socialist	Michael Kelly	3.32%	399	399.00	402.5	402.5	402.53	406.78	422.98	425.98			
SDLP	Olcan McSparron	1.46%	175	176.05	177.55	178.55	178.61	189.66					
Green (NI)	Sara Haller	0.90%	108	110.45	110.8	111.8	111.92	117.97					
Workers' Party	Tony Walls	0.71%	85	85.00	85.85	85.9	85.93						
Independent	Geoffrey Wilson	0.15%	18	19.05	19.10								
Electorate: 23,779 Valid: 12,023 (50.56%) Spoilt: 252 Quota: 1,718 Turnout: 12,275 (51.62%)

=== Lisnasharragh ===
2019: 2 x Alliance, 2 x DUP, 1 x SDLP, 1 x Green

2023: 2 x Alliance, 2 x DUP, 1 x SDLP, 1 x Green

2019–2023 Change: No Change

Lisnasharragh - 6 seats
Party	Candidate	FPv%	Count					
Party	Candidate	FPv%	1	2	3	4	5	6
DUP	Davy Douglas	17.39%	2,083					
DUP	Bradley Ferguson	8.85%	1,060	1,391.84	1,649.26	1,992.26		
Alliance	Michael Long*	12.00%	1,437	1,439.21	1,462.21	1,602.57	1,638.57	1,971.57
Alliance	Eric Hanvey* ‡	9.00%	1,078	1,078.68	1,099.02	1,160.36	1,205.36	1,747.36
SDLP	Séamas de Faoite*	13.19%	1,580	1,580.17	1,598.34	1,629.51	1,635.51	1,669.51
Green (NI)	Brian Smyth*	9.66%	1,157	1,158.19	1,273.53	1,422.91	1,491.91	1,588.76
Sinn Féin	Stevie Jenkins	10.28%	1,231	1,231.17	1,250.17	1,250.17	1,250.17	1,258.17
Alliance	Anna McErlean	8.03%	961	961.85	965.85	1,037.87	1,054.87	
UUP	Bill Manwaring	6.85%	820	828.67	921.71			
TUV	Stephen Ferguson	3.07%	368	375.14				
People Before Profit	Nick Cropper	1.67%	200	200.34				
Electorate: 21,488 Valid: 11,975 (55.73%) Spoilt: 116 Quota: 1,711 Turnout: 12,091 (56.27%)

=== Oldpark ===
2019: 3 x Sinn Féin, 1 x SDLP, 1 x DUP, 1 x People Before Profit

2023: 4 x Sinn Féin, 1 x DUP, 1 x Independent

2019–2023 Change: Sinn Féin and Independent gain from SDLP and People Before Profit

Oldpark - 6 seats
Party	Candidate	FPv%	Count						
Party	Candidate	FPv%	1	2	3	4	5	6	7
Sinn Féin	Nichola Bradley*	15.12%	1,870						
Independent	Paul McCusker*	14.13%	1,747	1,764.05	1,835.05				
Sinn Féin	JJ Magee*	13.09%	1,619	1,637.15	1,665.60	1,668.60	1,714.05	1,714.05	1,877.05
Sinn Féin	Ryan Murphy*	11.56%	1,430	1,472.70	1,493.95	1,497.95	1,524.05	1,526.05	1,704.40
DUP	Jordan Doran*	10.21%	1,263	1,263.00	1,273.05	1,273.05	1,310.05	1,606.05	1,634.10
Sinn Féin	Tomás Ó Néill	10.76%	1,330	1,335.35	1,353.45	1,367.45	1,402.70	1,404.70	1,601.55
DUP	Gillian Simpson	7.43%	919	919.00	924.00	924.00	962.00	1,232.00	1,260.00
People Before Profit	Fiona Ferguson*	5.66%	700	704.65	830.85	849.85	1,114.15	1,125.15	
TUV	Ann McClure	4.81%	595	595.00	604.00	604.00	624.00		
Alliance	Chris Shannon	3.66%	453	453.75	578.45	597.45			
SDLP	Charlotte Carson	1.98%	245	248.55					
Green (NI)	Ange Cruz	1.20%	149	149.35					
Workers' Party	Fiona McCarthy	0.37%	46	46.30					
Electorate: 23,871 Valid: 12,366 (51.80%) Spoilt: 193 Quota: 1,767 Turnout: 12,559 (52.61%)

=== Ormiston ===
2019: 3 x Alliance, 2 x DUP, 1 x UUP, 1 x Green

2023: 3 x Alliance, 2 x DUP, 1 x UUP, 1 x Green

2019–2023 Change: No change

Ormiston - 7 seats
Party	Candidate	FPv%	Count							
Party	Candidate	FPv%	1	2	3	4	5	6	7	8
Alliance	Christine Bower*	18.61%	2,661							
DUP	James Lawlor	16.75%	2,394							
DUP	Andrew McCormick	11.49%	1,642	1,648.72	2,180.22					
Alliance	Jenna Maghie*	9.09%	1,299	1,681.72	1,684.47	1,688.27	1,797.27			
Alliance	Ross McMullan* †	10.35%	1,480	1,585.28	1,587.03	1,593.63	1,666.83	1,684.59	2,542.59	
Green (NI)	Anthony Flynn*	6.99%	999	1,042.20	1,044.45	1,053.45	1,200.94	1,226.89	1,438.69	1,919.69
UUP	Jim Rodgers*	7.02%	1,004	1,010.40	1,024.40	1,157.00	1,162.00	1,532.42	1,557.42	1,644.42
UUP	Carole Howard*	5.93%	847	863.96	881.71	965.51	978.08	1,282.15	1,303.51	1,365.51
Alliance	Caitlin Sullivan	6.22%	889	1,145.64	1,145.64	1,147.04	1,196.92	1,199.32		
TUV	John Hiddleston	4.76%	680	684.16	710.91	863.91	870.93			
Sinn Féin	Caitríona Mallaghan	1.22%	174	181.04	181.29	181.69				
People Before Profit	Fiona Doran	0.82%	117	132.36	133.11	133.71				
SDLP	Lorcan McGuirk	0.74%	106	111.12	111.12	111.72				
Electorate: 26,314 Valid: 14,295 (54.32%) Spoilt: 84 Quota: 1,787 Turnout: 14,379 (54.64%)

=== Titanic ===
2019: 2 x DUP, 2 x Alliance, 1 x UUP, 1 x PUP

2023: 2 x DUP, 2 x Alliance, 1 x Sinn Féin, 1 x UUP

2019–2023 Change: Sinn Féin gain from PUP

Titanic - 6 seats
Party	Candidate	FPv%	Count					
Party	Candidate	FPv%	1	2	3	4	5	6
DUP	Ruth Brooks	16.98%	1,690					
DUP	Sammy Douglas*	12.20%	1,214	1,216	1,244.35	1,440.35		
Alliance	David Bell	13.66%	1,360	1,392	1,395.75	1,403.75	1,680.75	
Alliance	Fiona McAteer	11.54%	1,149	1,176	1,176.75	1,181.90	1,597.90	
Sinn Féin	Pádraig Donnelly	12.90%	1,284	1,304	1,304.30	1,305.30	1,399.45	1,489.45
UUP	Sonia Copeland*	9.72%	968	973	995.65	1,162.80	1,254.25	1,325.25
DUP	George Dorrian*	6.61%	658	660	842.70	1,012.10	1,033.30	1,040.30
Green (NI)	Gillian Hamilton	9.42%	938	969	970.95	984.10		
TUV	Anne Smyth	5.67%	564	567	577.05			
SDLP	Elly Omondi	1.30%	129					
Electorate: 24,018 Valid: 9,954 (41.44%) Spoilt: 209 Quota: 1,423 Turnout: 10,163 (42.31%)

== Changes during the term ==
=== † Co-options ===
Date co-opted	Electoral Area	Party	Outgoing	Co-optee	Reason
27 February 2024	Botanic	Sinn Féin	John Gormley	Conor McKay	Gormley resigned.
16 May 2024	Ormiston	Alliance	Ross McMullan	Hedley Abernethy	McMullan resigned.
13 August 2024	Balmoral	Sinn Féin	Geraldine McAteer	Natasha Brennan	McAteer resigned.
6 January 2025	Collin	Sinn Féin	Clíodhna Nic Bhranair	Siobhán McCallin	Resigned to focus on job in Stormont.
5 September 2025	Castle	Sinn Féin	Conor Maskey	Luke Meenehan	Maskey resigned.

=== ‡ Changes in affiliation ===
Date	Electoral Area	Name	Previous affiliation	New affiliation	Circumstance
4 November 2024	Oldpark	JJ Magee	Sinn Féin	Independent	Suspended from Sinn Féin over allegations of inappropriately messaging a minor.
25 January 2025	Oldpark	JJ Magee	Independent	Sinn Féin	Had whip restored following standards commissioner decision.
25 April 2026	Black Mountain	Paul Doherty	SDLP	Independent	Resigned from party following their abstention on a vote to take down a statue of Bobby Sands.
2 June 2026	Lisnasharragh	Eric Hanvey	Alliance	Independent	Resigned from Alliance over disagreements including joining the Northern Ireland Executive rather than opposition.
