= Margaret McKenzie (politician) =

Former High Sheriff of Belfast

High Sheriff of Belfast
- In office January 2008 – January 2009
- Preceded by: Jim Kirkpatrick
- Succeeded by: Frank McCoubrey

Member of Belfast City Council
- In office 5 May 2005 – 5 May 2011
- Preceded by: Margaret Clarke
- Succeeded by: Adam Newton
- Constituency: Pottinger

Personal details
- Born: June 1960 (age 65); Belfast, Northern Ireland
- Political party: Democratic Unionist

Margaret McKenzie (born June 1960) is a former Democratic Unionist Party (DUP) politician who served as High Sheriff of Belfast between January 2008 to 2009, as well as a City Councillor for the Pottinger DEA from 2005 to 2011.

== Background ==
At the 2001 Belfast City Council election, McKenzie ran unsuccessfully in the Pottinger District. At the 2005 local elections, however, She was one of three Democratic Unionist Party (DUP) councillors to be elected in that district.

In January 2008, McKenzie was made High Sheriff of Belfast. Commenting on her appointment, she said: "It is a great honour to have been elected to the post of High Sheriff, and I pledge to serve the people of Belfast, and to support the Lord Mayor and Deputy Lord Mayor in carrying out my duties to the best of my ability." In her role, McKenzie led Belfast's Remembrance Day service in November 2008.
