= Jim Rodgers (politician) =

British politician (born 1950)

Jim Rodgers OBE
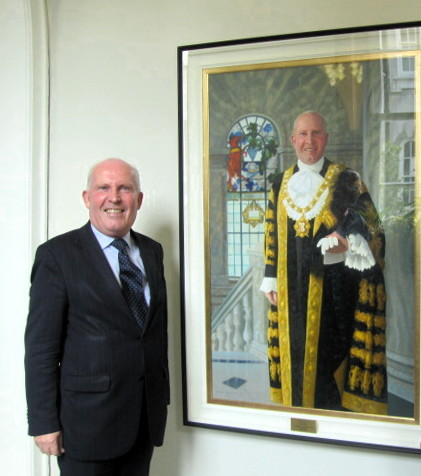

High Sheriff of Belfast
- In office 22 January 2016 – January 2017
- Preceded by: Gareth McKee
- Succeeded by: Tom Haire

64th Lord Mayor of Belfast
- In office 1 June 2007 – 1 June 2008
- Deputy: David Browne
- Preceded by: Pat McCarthy
- Succeeded by: Tom Hartley

58th Lord Mayor of Belfast
- In office 1 June 2001 – 1 June 2002
- Deputy: Hugh Smyth
- Preceded by: Sammy Wilson
- Succeeded by: Alex Maskey

Member of Belfast City Council
- Incumbent
- Assumed office 22 May 2014
- Preceded by: District created
- Constituency: Ormiston
- In office 19 May 1993 – 22 May 2014
- Preceded by: Alan Montgomery
- Succeeded by: District abolished
- Constituency: Victoria

Member of the Northern Ireland Forum for Belfast East
- In office 30 May 1996 – 25 April 1998

Personal details
- Born: 6 January 1943 (age 83) Belfast, Northern Ireland
- Party: Ulster Unionist Party
- Other political affiliations: Vanguard Unionist Progressive Party (1973)

Jim Rodgers OBE (b.1943) is a Northern Irish unionist politician who was Lord Mayor of Belfast from 2001 to 2002, and again from 2007 to 2008. Rodgers also served as the High Sheriff of Belfast from 2016 to 2017. A member of the Ulster Unionist Party (UUP), he has been a Belfast City Councillor for the Ormiston (formerly Victoria) DEA since 1993. Additionally, Rodgers is an appointed Alderman on the council.

== Work ==
He first stood for election in 1973 as a candidate for the Vanguard Unionist Progressive Party in the election to the Northern Ireland Assembly having abandoned the Ulster Unionist Party where he had served both as Secretary of the Young Unionists and a similar role in the Pottinger Unionist Association. He failed to get elected.

In 1996, he was elected to the Northern Ireland Peace Forum for East Belfast. Rodgers stood in the 1998, 2003 and 2007 Northern Ireland Assembly elections for East Belfast but was unsuccessful on each occasion. He is a councillor for Ormiston DEA on Belfast City Council and was elected as Lord Mayor of Belfast in 2001. Rodgers was again elected Lord Mayor in 2007, he had the backing of the Ulster Unionist Party (UUP) group on the council and the Social Democratic and Labour Party (SDLP).

Rodgers served on a variety of public bodies including Belfast Education and Library Board, Belfast District Policing Partnership, Sport Northern Ireland and the Northern Ireland Events Company. He is also a former director of Glentoran FC but resigned from his position a few days before a winding up order from HMRC was due to be heard by the High Court in January 2011.

At a DPP meeting in Short Strand Community centre on 15 June 2009, he claimed he had been attacked with eggs and stones by members of the IRSP.

In 2010, a council worker received a £24,000 payment for a back injury after Rogers tried to leapfrog over her during a council garden party.

In the run up to the 2019 Local Government Election, a leaflet for Mr Rodgers and fellow UUP councillor Peter Johnston alleged that the Alliance Party was "closely aligned" with the "IRA's political wing". The leaflet was widely condemned, with the UUP stating it was not sanctioned by the party. Rodgers had the party whip removed and was referred to the party's disciplinary committee.

In September 2026, it emerged that Rogers had been deselected as a candidate for the upcoming council election. On 17 November 2026, it was announced that Rogers had been suspended from the UUP, pending a disciplinary process, due to "inappropriate social media communications".

== Outside Interests ==
Rodgers has had a long interest in soccer and played football for both Bangor FC and Portadown FC.

He has worked as a scout for a number of English football teams in Northern Ireland. In the early 1970s he was affiliated to Ipswich Town F.C., then managed by Bobby Robson.

From 1975 to 1994 he was both chief scout and a youth development officer for Glentoran

Northern Ireland Forum
New forum	Member for East Belfast; 1996–1998	Forum dissolved
Civic offices
Preceded by Margaret Crooks	Deputy Lord Mayor of Belfast; 1997–1998	Succeeded by Bob Stoker
Preceded by Sammy Wilson	Lord Mayor of Belfast; 2001–02	Succeeded by Alex Maskey
Preceded by Pat McCarthy	Lord Mayor of Belfast; 2007–08	Succeeded by Tom Hartley
Preceded by Gareth McKee	High Sheriff of Belfast; 2016–2017	Succeeded by Tom Haire
