= High Sheriff of Belfast =

Judicial representative in Belfast, Northern Ireland

- Incumbent; Fiona McAteer since 14 January 2025
- Style: High Sheriff
- Appointer: Secretary of State (on the advice of the Council)
- Term length: One year
- Inaugural holder: Sir James Henderson
- Formation: 1900

The High Sheriff of Belfast is a title and position which was created in 1900 under the Local Government (Ireland) Act 1898, with Sir James Henderson the first holder. Like other high sheriff positions, it is largely a ceremonial post today. The current high sheriff is Councillor Fiona McAteer, who took office in January 2025.

The high sheriff is theoretically the judicial representative of the King in the city, while the Lord Lieutenant of Belfast is the Sovereign's personal representative. Today, the office is now largely symbolic, with few formal duties other than deputising for the Lord Mayor of Belfast at official events. Irish Nationalists and Republican council members generally do not allow their names to go forward for the nomination, as the post is seen as a reflection of the city's imperialist past.

Appointments are made annually by the Secretary of State for Northern Ireland, who asks the outgoing high sheriff and Belfast City Council to suggest the names of three people who are deemed suitable to hold the position. In recent years the council has suggested only one candidate, who is normally a member of the council. The high sheriff's term of office runs from January to December, which is distinct from the term of office for the lord mayor and deputy lord mayor who take up office in May or June each year.

Prior to 1900, sheriffs were elected by the city council.

== List of high sheriffs ==
=== 20th century ===
- 1900: Sir James Henderson
- 1901: Otto Jaffe
- 1902: Samuel Lawther
- 1903: Robert Anderson
- 1904: Henry Hutton
- 1905: Henry O'Neill
- 1906: William Frederick Coates
- 1907: Peter O'Connell
- 1908: John McCaughey
- 1909: Francis Curley
- 1910: George Doran
- 1911: Crawford McCullagh
- 1912: James Johnston
- 1913: Frank Workman
- 1914: John Tyrrell
- 1915: John Campbell White
- 1916: Robert Dunlop
- 1917: William Tougher
- 1918: Cllr Robert M Gaffikin JP
- 1919: Samuel Mercier
- 1920: William George Turner
- 1921: Joseph Davison
- 1922: Henry McKeag
- 1923: James Augustine Duff
- 1924: Hugh McLaurin JP
- 1925: William Macartney
- 1926: Oswald Jamison (Nationalist)
- 1927: Samuel Cheyne
- 1928: Julia McMordie
- 1929: Samuel Hall-Thompson
- 1930: James McKinney
- 1931: C. Lindsay
- 1932: F. J. Holland
- 1933: Richard Milligan Harcourt
- 1934: James Dunlop Williamson
- 1935: George Ruddell Black
- 1936: Thomas McConnell
- 1937: Thomas Loftus Cole?
- 1938: Thomas Loftus Cole
- 1939: Samuel Boyd Thompson
- 1940: William Dowling
- 1941: Percival Brown
- 1942: Tommy Henderson
- 1943: Frederick William Kennedy
- 1944: Alfred Hinds
- 1945: Robert Brown Alexander
- 1946: Cecil McKee
- 1947: W. E. G. Johnston
- 1948: James Henry Norritt
- 1949: Robert Harcourt
- 1950: Stuart Knox Henry
- 1951: William Harpur
- 1952: Andrew Scott
- 1953: Robert Pierce
- 1954: William Neill
- 1955?: Robert Kinahan
- 1956: Walter H. Cooper
- 1957: Herbert Jefferson
- 1958: Florence Elizabeth Breakie
- 1959: Martin Kelso Wallace
- 1960: William Duncan Geddis
- 1961: William Jenkins
- 1962: William John McCracken
- 1963: Joseph Foster Cairns
- 1964: William Christie
- 1965: John Abbott Lewis
- 1966: Matthew Thomas Orr
- 1967: Thomas Rea
- 1968: Hugh Robert Brown
- June 1969-June 1970: Myles Humphreys
- June 1970-June 1971: John William Kennedy
- June 1971-June 1972: Francis Wills Watson
- June 1972-June 1973: Walter Shannon
- June 1973–June 1974: Alfred Walker Shaw
- 1975: James Stewart
- 1976: William Cecil Corry
- 1977: John Allen
- 1978: John Carson
- 1979: Grace Bannister
- 1980: Michael Brown
- 1981: Muriel Pritchard
- 1982: Alfie Ferguson
- 1983: Donnell Deeny
- 1984: Pauline Whitley
- 1985: Andrew Cairns
- 1985–1986: Herbert Ditty
- 1987–1989: Post vacant
- 1990: Jim Kirkpatrick
- 1991: Joe Coggle
- 1992: Thomas Patton
- 1993: Jim Walker
- 1994: Mary Margaret Crooks
- 1995: John Parkes
- 1995: Joe Coggle
- 1996: Steve McBride
- 1997: Nelson McCausland
- 1998: Jim Clarke
- 1999: Robin Newton

=== 21st century ===
- 2000: Tom Campbell
- 2001: Alan Crowe
- 2002: Wallace Browne
- 2003: Margaret Clarke
- 2004: Ruth Patterson
- 2005: David Browne
- 2006: William Humphrey
- 2007: Jim Kirkpatrick
- 2008: Margaret McKenzie
- 2009: Frank McCoubrey
- 2010: Christopher Stalford
- 2011: Ian Adamson
- 2012: May Campbell
- 2013: Brian Kingston
- 2014: Lydia Patterson
- 2015: Gareth McKee
- 2016: Jim Rodgers
- 2017: Thomas Haire
- 2018: Carole Howard
- 2019: Tommy Sandford
- 2020: Nicola Angela Verner
- 2021: Michael Andrew Long
- 2022 John Hussey
- 2023 John Kyle
- 2024 Sammy Douglas
- 2025 Fiona McAteer

== See also ==
- Members of Belfast City Council
