= Titanic (District Electoral Area) =

Voting area in Belfast, Northern Ireland

- Belfast City Council DEA constituency

Current constituency
- Created: 2014
- Seats: 6 (2014–)
- Councillors: David Bell (APNI); Ruth Brooks (DUP); Sonia Copeland (UUP); Pádraig Donnelly (SF); Sammy Douglas (DUP); Fiona McAteer (APNI)

Titanic is one of the ten district electoral areas (DEA) in Belfast, Northern Ireland. Located in the east of the city, the district elects six members to Belfast City Council and contains the wards of Ballymacarrett, Beersbridge, Bloomfield, Connswater, Sydenham and Woodstock. Titanic, along with wards from the neighbouring Ormiston and Lisnasharragh DEAs, together with parts of Lisburn and Castlereagh District Council, form the Belfast East constituency for the Northern Ireland Assembly and UK Parliament.

The district was created for the 2014 local elections, largely replacing the Pottinger DEA, which had existed since 1985. The district takes its name from the city's Titanic Quarter, where the RMS Titanic was built.

== Councillors ==
Election	Councillor (Party)	Councillor (Party)	Councillor (Party)	Councillor (Party)	Councillor (Party)	Councillor (Party)
2023	David Bell (Alliance)	Fiona McAteer (Alliance)	Pádraig Donnelly (Sinn Féin)	Sonia Copeland (UUP)	Sammy Douglas (DUP)	Ruth Brooks (DUP)
February 2022 Defection	Michelle Kelly (Alliance)	Carole Howard (UUP)/ (Alliance)	John Kyle (UUP)/ (Independent)/ (PUP)	Sonia Copeland (UUP)	George Dorrian (DUP)	Adam Newton (DUP)
December 2021 Defections	Michelle Kelly (Alliance)	Carole Howard (UUP)/ (Alliance)	John Kyle (UUP)/ (Independent)/ (PUP)	Sonia Copeland (UUP)	George Dorrian (DUP)	Adam Newton (DUP)
2019	Michelle Kelly (Alliance)	Carole Howard (UUP)/ (Alliance)	John Kyle (UUP)/ (Independent)/ (PUP)	Sonia Copeland (UUP)	George Dorrian (DUP)	Adam Newton (DUP)
November 2016 Co-Option	David Armitage (Alliance)	Mairéad O'Donnell (Sinn Féin)	John Kyle (UUP)/ (Independent)/ (PUP)	Sonia Copeland (UUP)	George Dorrian (DUP)	Adam Newton (DUP)
May 2016 Co-Option	David Armitage (Alliance)	Mairéad O'Donnell (Sinn Féin)	John Kyle (UUP)/ (Independent)/ (PUP)	Sonia Copeland (UUP)	Brian Kennedy (DUP)	Adam Newton (DUP)
June 2015 Co-Option	David Armitage (Alliance)	Niall Ó Donnghaile (Sinn Féin)	John Kyle (UUP)/ (Independent)/ (PUP)	Sonia Copeland (UUP)	Brian Kennedy (DUP)	Adam Newton (DUP)
2014	David Armitage (Alliance)	Niall Ó Donnghaile (Sinn Féin)	John Kyle (UUP)/ (Independent)/ (PUP)	Sonia Copeland (UUP)	Gavin Robinson (DUP)	Adam Newton (DUP)

== 2023 Results ==
2019: 2 x DUP, 2 x Alliance, 1 x UUP, 1 x PUP

2023: 2 x DUP, 2 x Alliance, 1 x Sinn Féin, 1 x UUP

2019–2023 Change: Sinn Féin gain from PUP

Titanic - 6 seats
Party	Candidate	FPv%	Count					
Party	Candidate	FPv%	1	2	3	4	5	6
DUP	Ruth Brooks	16.98%	1,690					
DUP	Sammy Douglas*	12.20%	1,214	1,216	1,244.35	1,440.35		
Alliance	David Bell	13.66%	1,360	1,392	1,395.75	1,403.75	1,680.75	
Alliance	Fiona McAteer	11.54%	1,149	1,176	1,176.75	1,181.90	1,597.90	
Sinn Féin	Pádraig Donnelly	12.90%	1,284	1,304	1,304.30	1,305.30	1,399.45	1,489.45
UUP	Sonia Copeland*	9.72%	968	973	995.65	1,162.80	1,254.25	1,325.25
DUP	George Dorrian*	6.61%	658	660	842.70	1,012.10	1,033.30	1,040.30
Green (NI)	Gillian Hamilton	9.42%	938	969	970.95	984.10		
TUV	Anne Smyth	5.67%	564	567	577.05			
SDLP	Elly Omondi	1.30%	129					
Electorate: 24,018 Valid: 9,954 (41.44%) Spoilt: 209 Quota: 1,423 Turnout: 10,163 (42.31%)

== 2019 Results ==
2014: 2 x DUP, 1 x Alliance, 1 x UUP, 1 x PUP, 1 x Sinn Féin

2019: 2 x DUP, 2 x Alliance, 1 x UUP, 1 x PUP

2014-2019 Change: Alliance gain from Sinn Féin

Titanic - 6 seats
Party	Candidate	FPv%	Count							
Party	Candidate	FPv%	1	2	3	4	5	6	7	8
DUP	George Dorrian*	13.41%	1,270	1,317	1,328	1,432				
DUP	Adam Newton*	9.64%	913	928	932	961	997.9	1,520.9		
Alliance	Michelle Kelly	11.28%	1,068	1,072	1,079	1,094	1,094	1,100	1,353	
UUP	Sonia Copeland*	9.00%	852	890	1,096	1,230	1,247.22	1,277.68	1,307.68	1,410.28
PUP	John Kyle* ‡	10.85%	1,027	1,079	1,104	1,209	1,216.38	1,257.3	1,309.3	1,368.7
Alliance	Carole Howard ‡	11.14%	1,055	1,061	1,075	1,096	1,096.82	1,099.64	1,314.64	1,318.24
Sinn Féin	Mairead O’Donnell*	11.64%	1,102	1,103	1,103	1,103	1,103	1,103	1,145	1,145
Green (NI)	Ben Smylie	6.77%	641	652	656	680	680.82	680.82		
DUP	Lee Reynolds	6.19%	586	597	602	610	625.58			
Independent	Karl Bennett	4.73%	448	468	473					
UUP	Colin Hall-Thompson	2.94%	278	286						
UKIP	Paul Girvan	2.41%	228							
Electorate: 22,653 Valid: 9,468 (41.80%) Spoilt: 184 Quota: 1,353 Turnout: 9,652 (42.61%)

== 2014 Results ==
2014: 2 x DUP, 1 x UUP, 1 x Alliance, 1 x Sinn Féin, 1 x PUP

Titanic - 6 seats
Party	Candidate	FPv%	Count									
Party	Candidate	FPv%	1	2	3	4	5	6	7	8	9	10
UUP	Sonia Copeland	16.68%	1,651									
PUP	John Kyle*	11.62%	1,150	1,237.92	1,239.92	1,239.92	1,259.18	1,273.6	1,308.14	1,325.4	1,454.4	
DUP	Adam Newton*	10.27%	1,017	1,043.74	1,044.74	1,046.88	1,056.02	1,061.02	1,082.72	1,351.1	1,428.1	
DUP	Gavin Robinson* †	11.60%	1,148	1,179.78	1,179.78	1,181.78	1,187.92	1,191.92	1,205.34	1,322	1,418.04	
Sinn Féin	Niall Ó Donnghaile* †	11.68%	1,156	1,156	1,183	1,198	1,207	1,211.14	1,218.14	1,218.14	1,222.14	1,228.7
Alliance	David Armitage	7.88%	780	783.92	785.92	803.92	816.2	872.34	969.04	972.04	990.04	1,031.44
Alliance	Máire Hendron*	7.26%	719	721.66	726.66	761.66	772.8	821.94	890.08	892.08	903.08	929.62
TUV	Harry Toan	5.84%	578	606.56	607.56	607.56	610.98	615.98	624.52	634.52	793.78	
UKIP	Jonny Lavery	5.49%	544	564.72	566.72	569.86	577	587.14	603.56	610.98		
DUP	Sam White	4.20%	416	423.7	423.84	423.84	426.84	431.84	433.12			
NI21	Jimmy Davidson	2.55%	252	257.88	257.88	261.88	271.16	311.3				
Green (NI)	Gregor Claus	2.14%	212	213.26	215.26	221.26	242.4					
Socialist Party	Tommy Black	1.09%	108	111.5	113.5	120.5						
SDLP	Peter Devlin	1.00%	99	99.42	106.42							
Workers' Party	Kevin McNally	0.71%	70	70.14								
Electorate: 21,425 Valid: 9,900 (46.21%) Spoilt: 182 Quota: 1,415 Turnout: 10,082 (47.06%)
