= Belfast City Council =

Local authority in Northern Ireland

Coordinates: 54°35′38″N 5°55′46″W

Belfast City Council Irish: Comhairle Cathrach Bhéal Feirste
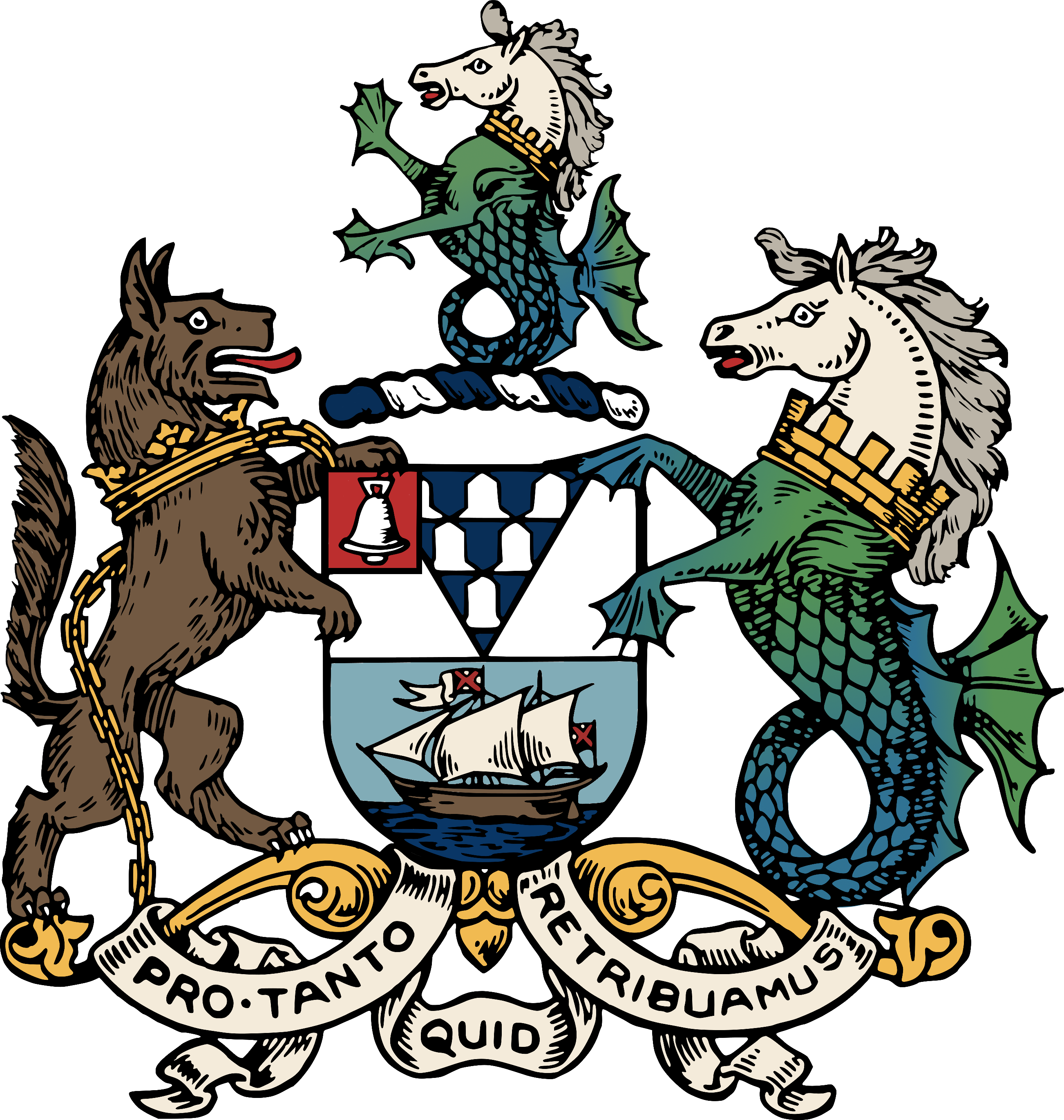
- Coat of arms of Belfast

- Council logo

Type
- Type: District council of Belfast

Leadership
- Lord Mayor: Róis-Máire Donnelly, Sinn Féin
- Deputy Lord Mayor: Hedley Abernethy, Alliance

Structure
- Seats: 60
- Graph of the party split among 60 seats.
- Political groups: All parties (60) Sinn Féin (22) DUP (14) Alliance (10) SDLP (4) Green (NI) (3) UUP (2) TUV (1) PBP (1) Independent (3)
- Length of term: 4 years

Elections
- Voting system: Single transferable vote
- Last election: 18 May 2023
- Next election: 6 May 2027

Meeting place
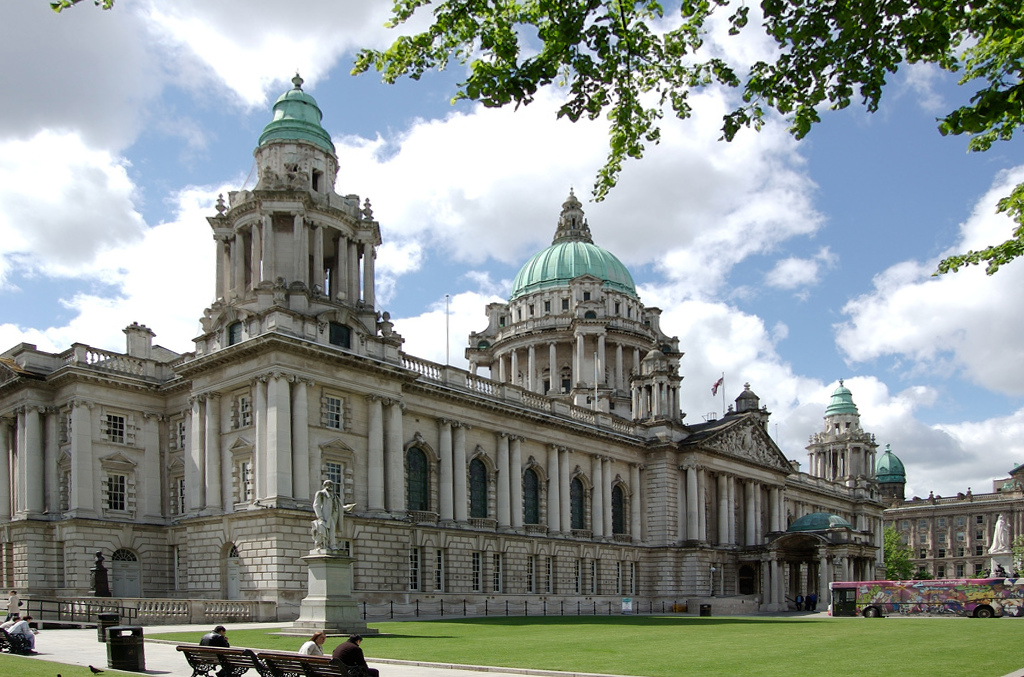
- Belfast City Hall

Website
- belfastcity.gov.uk

Belfast City Council (Irish: Comhairle Cathrach Bhéal Feirste) is the local authority with responsibility for part of Belfast, the largest city of Northern Ireland. The council serves an estimated population of 351,927 (2025), the largest of any district council in Northern Ireland, while being the smallest by area. Belfast City Council is the primary council of the Belfast Metropolitan Area, a grouping of six former district councils with commuter towns and overspill from Belfast, containing a total population of 579,276.

The council is made up of 60 councillors, elected from ten district electoral areas. It holds its meetings in the historic Belfast City Hall. The Lord Mayor as of 2 June 2025 is Tracy Kelly. The Deputy Lord Mayor is Paul Doherty, who was originally nominated by the SDLP before later resigning from the party.

As part of the 2014/2015 reform of local government in Northern Ireland the city council area expanded, covering an area that includes 53,000 additional residents in 21,000 households. The number of councillors increased from 51 to 60. The first elections to the expanded city council took place on 22 May 2014.

== History ==
Belfast's modern history can be dated back to the Plantation of Ulster in the early 17th century which brought significant numbers of Protestant Scottish and English settlers to Ulster. The town gradually developed to become a major industrial centre, in particular in the areas of linen and ship building. In recognition of this growth Belfast was granted city status in 1888 and, by 1901, it was the largest city in Ireland. The city's importance was evidenced by the construction of the lavish City Hall, completed in 1906.

The body now known as Belfast City Council has its origins in the defunct Belfast Corporation, and was created in its current form following the local council elections of May 1973. Originally it was intended that there would be 52 wards. However, local inquiries meant that the proposed Tullycarnet ward became instead the Castlereagh Borough Council wards of Tullycarnet and Gilnahirk, leaving Belfast with 51. Although the county borough of Belfast was created when it was granted city status by Queen Victoria in 1888, the city continues to be viewed as straddling County Antrim and County Down with the River Lagan generally being seen as the line of demarcation.

From the late 18th century onwards, the city's Roman Catholic population gradually increased, although the city was still dominated by its mostly Ulster Protestant majority. The council was dominated by unionists from its inception until 1997, when they lost overall control for the first time in its history, with the Alliance Party of Northern Ireland gaining the balance of power between Irish nationalists and unionists. This position was confirmed in the three subsequent council elections, with mayors from the Irish nationalist Sinn Féin and Social Democratic and Labour Party (SDLP), and the cross-community Alliance Party regularly elected since 1997. The election in 2011 saw Irish nationalist councillors outnumber unionist councillors for the first time, 24–21, with Sinn Féin becoming the largest party, and the Alliance Party maintaining the balance of power with six members. The 2011 census findings confirmed this significant change in demographics. In the Belfast City Council area, the proportion of people who were Catholic or brought up Catholic (48.58%) is larger than those who were Protestant or brought up Protestant (42.30%) for the first time. In terms of national identity 43.16% of the population considered themselves to be British, 34.77% considered themselves to be Irish, and 26.82% considered themselves to be of Northern Irish nationality.

== Coat of arms and motto ==
The city of Belfast has the Latin motto "Pro tanto quid retribuamus." This is taken from Psalm 116 Verse 12 in the Latin Vulgate Bible and is literally "For (Pro) so much (tanto) what (quid) we shall repay (retribuamus)" The verse has been translated in bibles differently – for example as "What shall I render unto the Lord for all his benefits toward me?". It is also translated as "In return for so much, what shall we give back?" The Queen's University Students' Union Rag Week publication PTQ derives its name from the first three words of the motto.

The coat of arms of the city (pictured, above right) are blazoned as Party per fesse argent and azure, in chief a pile vair and on a canton gules a bell argent, in base a ship with sails set argent on waves of the sea proper. This heraldic language describes a shield that is divided in two horizontally (party per fesse). The top (chief) of the shield is silver (argent), and has a point-down triangle (a pile) with a repeating blue-and-white pattern that represents fur (vair). There is also a red square in the top corner (a canton gules) on which there is a silver bell. It is likely that the bell is an example here of "canting" (or punning) heraldry, representing the first syllable of Belfast. In the lower part of the shield (in base) there is a silver sailing ship shown sailing on waves coloured in the actual colours of the sea (proper). The supporter on the "dexter" side (that is, the viewer's left) is a chained wolf, while on the "sinister" side the supporter is a sea-horse. The crest above the shield is also a sea-horse. These arms date back to 1613, when King James I granted Belfast town status. The seal was used by Belfast merchants throughout the 17th century on their signs and trade-coins. A large stained glass window in the City Hall displays the arms, where an explanation suggests that the seahorse and the ship refer to Belfast's significant maritime history. The wolf may be a tribute to the city's founder, Sir Arthur Chichester, and refer to his own coat of arms.

== Councillors ==
The latest election to Belfast City Council took place on 18 May 2023, with the city's voters electing sixty councillors.

=== Party strengths ===
Party	Elected 2014	Elected 2019	Elected 2023	Current
Sinn Féin	19	18	22	22
DUP	13	15	14	14
Alliance	8	10	11	10
SDLP	7	6	5	4
Green (NI)	1	4	3	3
People Before Profit	1	3	1	1
UUP	7	2	2	2
PUP	3	2	0	0
TUV	1	0	1	1
Independent	0	0	1	3

=== Historical composition ===
Parties' election performances have changed substantially since the council election in 1973. The Ulster Unionist Party made a strong initial showing and remained the largest unionist party until 2005, when the Democratic Unionist Party became the dominant unionist party, while Sinn Féin has become the largest party overall. Nationalist representation showed a steady increase until recently, however still managed to become the largest grouping in the 2011 election. The number of unionist councillors has fallen almost every election. Cross-community representation has increased somewhat rapidly over the last few elections, almost overtaking the unionist representation in the 2023 election.

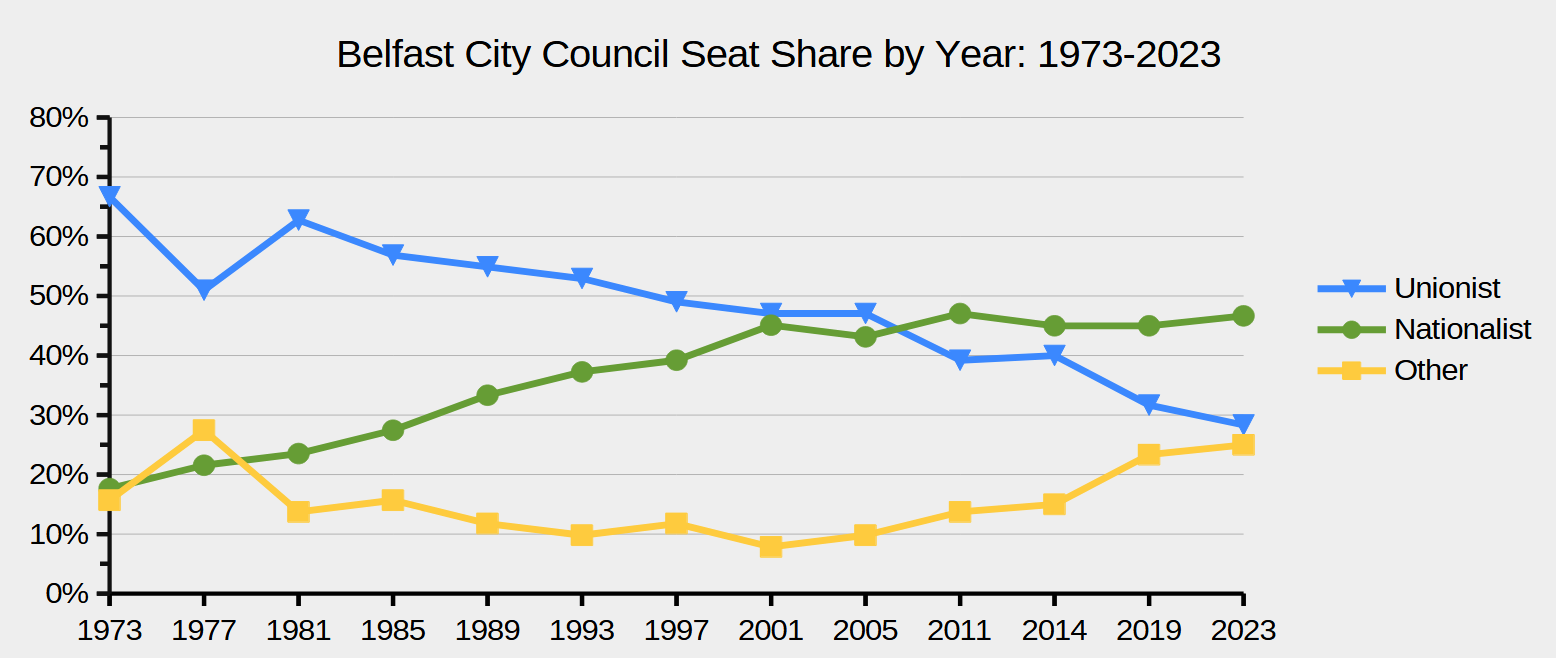
Shows the percentage of seats given to unionist, nationalist and other candidates in elections to Belfast City Council. The Alliance Party has been included as "other" in all years.

Party	2023	2019	2014	2011	2005	2001	1997	1993	1989	1985	1981	1977	1973
Sinn Féin	22	18	19	16	14	14	13	10	8	7	0	0	0
DUP	14	15	13	15	15	10	7	9	8	11	15	7	2
Alliance	11	10	8	6	4	3	6	5	6	8	7	13	8
UUP	2	2	7	3	7	11	13	15	14	14	13	15	25
SDLP	5	6	7	8	8	9	7	9	8	6	6	8	7
PUP	0	2	3	2	2	3	3	1	1	1	1	0	0
Other	6 (Note: Green Party Northern Ireland (3); People Before Profit (1); TUV (1); Independent (1))	7 (Note: Green Party Northern Ireland (4); People Before Profit (3))	3 (Note: Traditional Unionist Voice (1); Green Party Northern Ireland (1); People Before Profit (1))	1 (Note: Independent (1))	1 (Note: Independent (1))	1 (Note: Independent (1))	2 (Note: Ulster Democratic Party (1); Independent Unionist (1))	2 (Note: Independent Unionist (2))	6 (Note: Workers' Party (1); Independent Unionist (4); Protestant Unionist (1))	4 (Note: Workers' Party (1); Independent Unionist (2); Protestant Unionist (1))	9 (Note: People's Democracy (2); Irish Republican Socialist Party (2); Ulster Democratic Party (1); Unionist Party of Northern Ireland (1); Independent Unionist (1); Independent Socialist (1); Anti H-Block (1))	8 (Note: Republican Clubs (3); Unionist Party of Northern Ireland (2); Independent Unionist (2); Independent (1))	9 (Note: Northern Ireland Labour Party (2); Republican Clubs (2); Independent Unionist (2); United Loyalist (2); Loyalist Coalition (1))
Total	60	60	60	51	51	51	51	51	51	51	51	51	51

=== Councillors by electoral area ===
For further details see 2023 Belfast City Council election.

The council area is subdivided into 60 electoral wards, nominally one for each elected councillor. However, as the PR-STV voting system requires multi-seat constituencies, the 60 wards are grouped into ten district electoral areas (DEA) which elect between five and seven councillors each:

- Balmoral (5)
- Black Mountain (7)
- Botanic (5)
- Castle (6)
- Collin (6)
- Court (6)
- Lisnasharragh (6)
- Oldpark (6)
- Ormiston (7)
- Titanic (6)

The current members are:

Current council members
District electoral area	Name	Party
Balmoral	Natasha Brennan (Note: Councillor was co-opted during this term)	Sinn Féin
Balmoral	Donal Lyons	SDLP
Balmoral	Tara Brooks	Alliance
Balmoral	Sarah Bunting (Note: Party Group Leader)	DUP
Balmoral	Micky Murray	Alliance
Black Mountain	Ciarán Beattie	Sinn Féin
Black Mountain	Micheal Donnelly	Sinn Féin
Black Mountain	Arder Carson	Sinn Féin
Black Mountain	Ronan McLaughlin	Sinn Féin
Black Mountain	Paul Doherty (Note: Councillor changed party affiliation during this term)	Independent
Black Mountain	Áine McCabe	Sinn Féin
Black Mountain	Róis-Máire Donnelly	Sinn Féin
Botanic	Gary McKeown	SDLP
Botanic	Tracy Kelly	DUP
Botanic	Emmet McDonough-Brown	Alliance
Botanic	Conor McKay	Sinn Féin
Botanic	Áine Groogan	Green (NI)
Castle	Brónach Anglin	Sinn Féin
Castle	Luke Meenehan	Sinn Féin
Castle	Fred Cobain	DUP
Castle	Dean McCullough	DUP
Castle	Sam Nelson	Alliance
Castle	Carl Whyte	SDLP
Collin	Joe Duffy	Sinn Féin
Collin	Caoimhín McCann	Sinn Féin
Collin	Matt Garrett	Sinn Féin
Collin	Séanna Walsh	Sinn Féin
Collin	Siobhán McCallin	Sinn Féin
Collin	Michael Collins	People Before Profit
Court	Frank McCoubrey	DUP
Court	Tina Black	Sinn Féin
Court	Nicola Verner	DUP
Court	Claire Canavan	Sinn Féin
Court	Ian McLaughlin	DUP
Court	Ron McDowell	TUV
Lisnasharragh	Davy Douglas	DUP
Lisnasharragh	Bradley Ferguson	DUP
Lisnasharragh	Michael Long	Alliance
Lisnasharragh	Eric Hanvey	Independent
Lisnasharragh	Séamas De Faoite	SDLP
Lisnasharragh	Brian Smyth	Green (NI)
Oldpark	Nichola Bradley	Sinn Féin
Oldpark	Paul McCusker	Independent
Oldpark	J.J. Magee	Sinn Féin
Oldpark	Ryan Murphy	Sinn Féin
Oldpark	Tomás Ó Néill	Sinn Féin
Oldpark	Jordan Doran	DUP
Ormiston	Christine Bower	Alliance
Ormiston	James Lawlor	DUP
Ormiston	Andrew McCormick	DUP
Ormiston	Jenna Maghie	Alliance
Ormiston	Hedley Abernethy	Alliance
Ormiston	Anthony Flynn	Green (NI)
Ormiston	Jim Rodgers	UUP
Titanic	Ruth Brooks	DUP
Titanic	Sammy Douglas	DUP
Titanic	David Bell	Alliance
Titanic	Fiona McAteer	Alliance
Titanic	Pádraig Donnelly	Sinn Féin
Titanic	Sonia Copeland	UUP

== Offices ==
=== Lord Mayor and Deputy Lord Mayor ===
Lord Mayor of Belfast
- Belfast City Coat of Arms
- Incumbent; Róis-Máire Donnelly, Sinn Féin since 1 June 2026
- Style: The Right Honourable
- Appointer: Belfast City Council
- Term length: One year
- Inaugural holder: Sir Daniel Dixon
- Formation: 1892
- Deputy: Paul Doherty

The Lord Mayor of Belfast is the leader and chairman of Belfast City Council and is elected annually by the council to serve a one-year term. A Deputy Lord Mayor is normally elected at the same council meeting as the Lord Mayor.

The Lord Mayor's role is largely ceremonial, but does include the following powers and duties:

- In times of natural disaster the Lord Mayor may direct resources such as Police, Fire and Ambulance as they see fit
- Presiding over meetings of the council and, in the case of equality of votes, the Lord Mayor has a second or casting vote
- Promoting and raising awareness of the council's main objectives and priority issues
- Encouraging and supporting all aspects of life in Belfast by attending civic and public events
- Receiving distinguished visitors to the city
- Acting as host on behalf of the council and the citizens of Belfast at civic functions
- Acting as a spokesperson to the local, national and international media
- Providing an appropriate response on behalf of Belfast at times of local, national and international catastrophe
- Supporting and encouraging charitable and other appeals as appropriate
- Promoting Belfast's business, commercial, cultural and social life
- Promoting Belfast as a place of excellence in which to do business and as a tourist destination.

The position that is now the Lord Mayor originated in 1613 in the town's Royal Charter as the 'Sovereign of Belfast'. In 1842, this position was restyled the 'Mayor of Belfast'. When Belfast was granted city status in 1892, the position was given Lord Mayor status, making it one of only three cities on the island of Ireland having a Lord Mayor, the other two being Cork and Dublin. In 1929, it became one of only six cities in the United Kingdom to have a Lord Mayor styled "the Right Honourable". Until 1973 the position was held for three years, when it was reduced to its current term of one year. From its formation in 1921 until its abolition in 1972, the Lord Mayor was automatically entitled to a seat in the Senate of Northern Ireland.

For most of the city's modern history, the position has been held by unionists, with members of the Ulster Unionist Party holding the post for a total of 61 of the 67 years between 1921 and 1997. The first non-unionist Lord Mayor since the partition of Ireland in 1921 was David Cook from the Alliance Party, who was elected in 1978. The first Irish nationalist Lord Mayor was not appointed until the election of Alban Maginness from the SDLP in 1997, while a Sinn Féin Lord Mayor was first elected in 2002. The end of the unionist majority on the council in 1997 has resulted in a greater rotation of the position amongst the parties, which, like other elected positions within the Council such as Committee chairs, is now filled using the D'Hondt system. This system awards positions to parties based on their number of councillors.

=== Aldermen ===
The Local Government (Modification of Borough Charters) Order (Northern Ireland) 1973 entitles the council to appoint up to twelve of its members to the honorary position of alderman. The role of alderman is appointed at the first annual meeting following the election of the council and does not carry any extra responsibilities other than the right to be referred to as an alderman rather than councillor. Following the local elections in 1997 and 2005 the Council voted not to appoint any of its members to the positions, however all twelve places were filled after the May 2011 election.

The present Aldermen are:

Name	District Electoral Area (DEA)	Party
James Lawlor	Ormiston	Democratic Unionist Party
Frank McCoubrey	Court	Democratic Unionist Party
Sonia Copeland	Titanic	Ulster Unionist Party
Dean McCullough	Castle	Democratic Unionist Party
Jim Rodgers	Orminston	Ulster Unionist Party

=== High Sheriff ===
High Sheriff of Belfast
- Incumbent; Sammy Douglas (DUP) since January 2024
- Style: High Sheriff
- Appointer: Secretary of State (on the advice of the Council)
- Term length: One year
- Inaugural holder: Sir James Henderson
- Formation: 1900

The High Sheriff of Belfast is a largely ceremonial position currently held by Sammy Douglas who took office on 1 January 2024. The High Sheriff is theoretically the King's judicial representative in the city, while the Lord Lieutenant is the Sovereign's personal representative, however the office is now largely symbolic with few formal duties other than deputising for the Lord Mayor at official events. The position was created in 1900 under the Local Government (Ireland) Act 1898, with Sir James Henderson the first holder. Appointments are made on annual basis by the Secretary of State for Northern Ireland, who asks the outgoing High Sheriff and the council to suggest the names of three people who are deemed suitable to hold the position. In recent years the council has suggested only one candidate, who is normally a member of the council. The High Sheriff's term of office runs from January to December, which is distinct from the term of office for the Lord Mayor and Deputy Lord Mayor who take up office in May or June each year.

=== Lord Lieutenant ===
The Lord Lieutenant of Belfast is the official representative of the King for the 'County Borough of Belfast'. The Lord Lieutenant is Dame Finnouala Jay-O'Boyle, DBE who was appointed in July 2014. The position was first created in 1900 and was held by the Marquess of Londonderry. The role is largely honorary with the few formal duties relating to liaising with the King's Private Office in the lead up to visits to the City regarding issues of local concern and the presentation of awards on behalf of the King.

== 2014/2015 reform ==
The district councils of Northern Ireland were reformed in 2015. The councillors elected on 5 May 2011 served on Belfast City Council until 31 March 2015. At the local elections on 22 May 2014 a new Belfast City Council was elected and acted as a shadow authority until coming into its powers on 1 April 2015. The local government district of Belfast was expanded on 1 April 2015 to the south to include areas formerly part of the Castlereagh, Lisburn and North Down districts. The new electoral areas are Balmoral, Black Mountain, Botanic, Castle, Collin, Court, Lisnasharragh, Oldpark, Ormiston and Titanic.

== Parliamentary and Assembly constituencies ==
Belfast has four coterminous constituencies for the UK Parliament and the Northern Ireland Assembly, which extend somewhat beyond the city boundaries into parts of Castlereagh, Lisburn and Newtownabbey districts. At the 2024 UK general election, Belfast returned four MPs for the following constituencies: Belfast North (John Finucane, Sinn Féin), Belfast East (Gavin Robinson, DUP), Belfast South and Mid Down (Claire Hanna, SDLP) and Belfast West (Paul Maskey, Sinn Féin). Additionally, Garnerville ward of Belfast is in North Down parliamentary constituency.

In the 2022 Northern Ireland Assembly election, Belfast returned a total of 20 MLAs (five per constituency) for the constituencies of Belfast North, Belfast East, Belfast South and Belfast West. Prior to the 2017 election, each constituency elected six MLAs or a total of 24 MLAs for Belfast.

The results for both elections are summarised below:

Party	UK 2024	+/-	NIA 2022	+/-
Sinn Féin	2	Steady	7	Steady
Democratic Unionist Party	1	Steady	5	Steady
Social Democratic and Labour Party	1	Steady	1	▼1
Alliance Party of Northern Ireland	0	Steady	5	▲2
Ulster Unionist Party	0	Steady	1	Steady
Other	0	Steady	1 (Note: One MLA from People Before Profit elected for Belfast West (Assembly constituency))	▼1 (Note: One MLA from the Green Party Northern Ireland, previously elected for Belfast South (Assembly constituency))

	UK Parliament		Northern Ireland Assembly
UK Constituency	Name	Party	Parties
Belfast North	John Finucane	Sinn Féin	
Belfast East	Gavin Robinson	DUP	
Belfast South and Mid Down	Claire Hanna	SDLP	
Belfast West	Paul Maskey	Sinn Féin	

== Premises ==
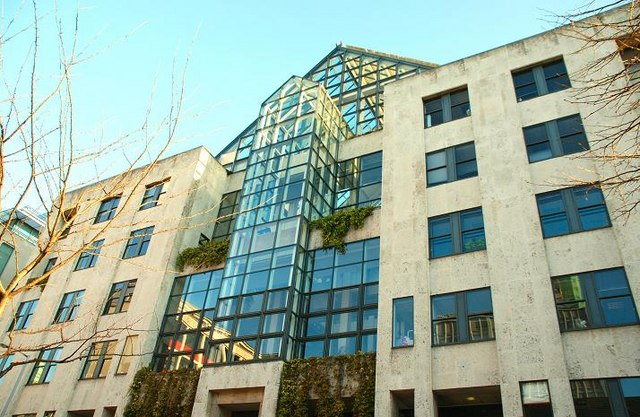
Cecil Ward Building, 4-10 Linenhall Street, Belfast

Council meetings are held at Belfast City Hall in Donegall Square, which was completed in 1906. The council has a number of other administrative buildings nearby, notably including the Cecil Ward Building at 4-10 Linenhall Street, completed in 1990 and named after a former Town Clerk of Belfast, and an adjoining building at 9-21 Adelaide Street, completed in 2016.

== Committees ==
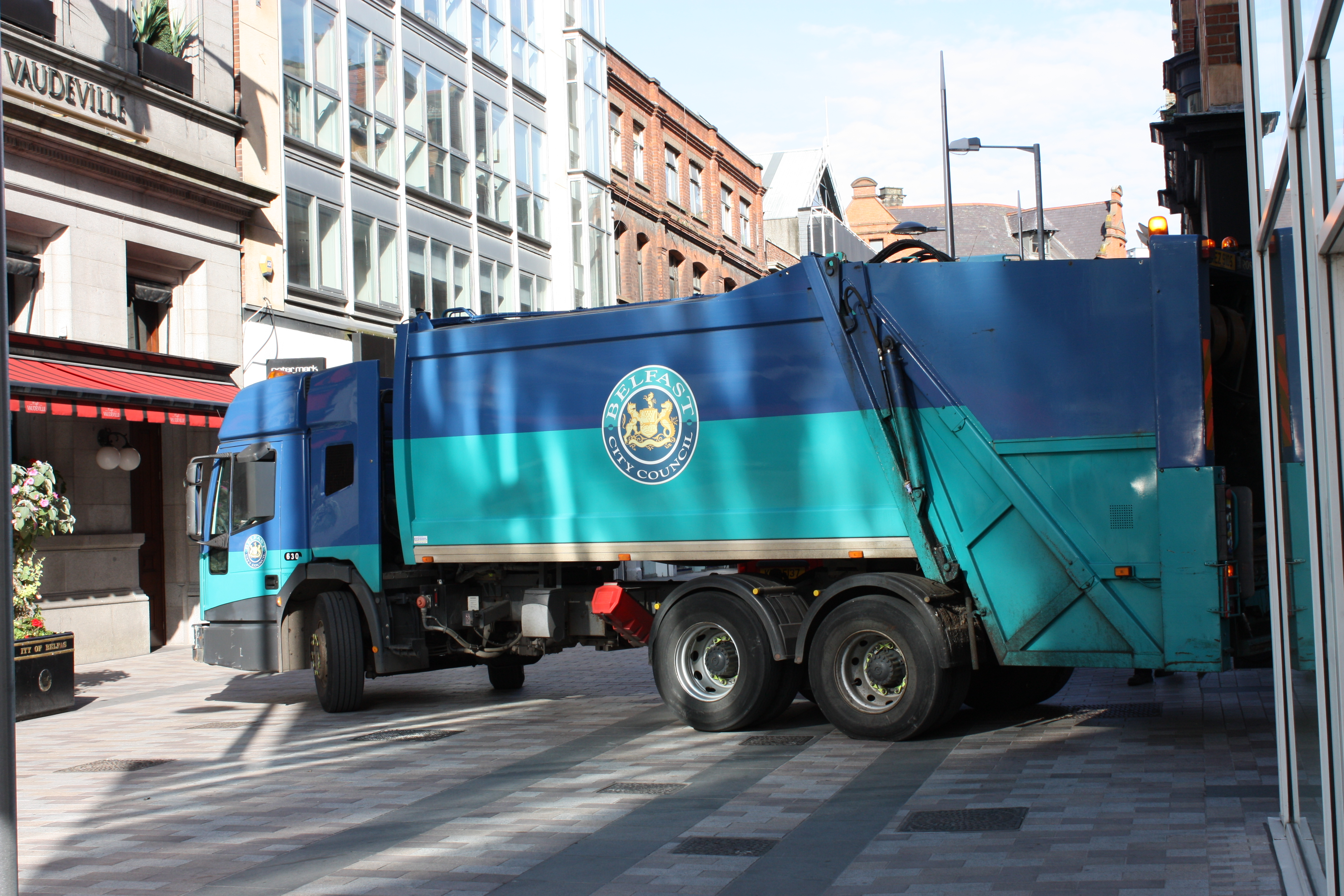
Waste collection vehicle, Arthur Street, Belfast, October 2009

The council has eight committees, the members of which are appointed at the annual meeting of the council.

Each of the committees consists of 20 councillors with the quorum (the minimum number of councillors that are required to be present to transact business legally) of each committee being five members. Committees sit at least monthly with the exception of July. All committees are constituted to reflect, as far as practicable, the different political groups into which the members of the council are divided. The posts of chairman and deputy chairman of committees are allocated on the basis of the d'Hondt system of proportionality:

- Strategic Policy & Resources
- People & Communities
- City Growth & Regeneration
- Licensing Committee
- Planning
- Standards & Business
- Climate & City Resilience
- Waterfront & Ulster Hall

== Minutes ==
Minutes of meetings of council committees and subcommittees are available at Belfast City Council (searchable) and at Belfast NI Gov Wiki (unofficial site).

== Council departments ==
The council has seven departments.

Department	Activities	See also	Link
Chief Executive's	Responsible for providing support to the Lord Mayor and councillors in their roles as public representatives.		
Corporate Services	Responsible for human resources, financial services and information systems. Also oversees the registration of births, deaths, marriages and civil partnerships.		
Development	Responsibilities include: – Community and play development – Culture and heritage – Economic development – Events – Physical regeneration – Tourism – Venue Management	St George's Market; Ulster Hall; Waterfront Hall	
Health and Environmental Services	Works to protect and promote the health, safety and well-being of all who live in the city or who come into the city each day to work or visit. Also has important waste management responsibilities, including promoting waste reduction and recycling and making arrangements for the collection, treatment and disposal of waste.		
Improvement	Responsible for developing and delivering a single improvement and efficiency agenda for the organisation.		
Legal Services	Provides comprehensive legal advice to the council.		
Parks and Leisure	Maintain the city's green spaces and organising park events and activities. They also work to promote some of Belfast's biggest tourist attractions and manage many of the council's major assets.	Belfast Zoo; Belfast Botanic Gardens; Belfast Castle; Belfast City Cemetery; Parks and gardens in Belfast	

== Demography ==
The area covered by the current Belfast City Council has a population of 333,871 residents according to the 2011 Northern Ireland census. The area covered by the old Belfast City Council before the 2015 local government reorganisation in Northern Ireland had a population of 280,962 residents according to the same census.

In the 2011 census the distributions of population, religion, national identity and proportion of immigrants within the Belfast City Council area were as follows.

Population density

Percentage who were Catholic or brought up Catholic

Most commonly stated national identity

Percentage born outside the UK and Ireland

=== 2011 census ===
On Census Day (27 March 2011) the usually resident population of Belfast Local Government District was 333,871 accounting for 18.44% of the NI total. This represents a 1.60% increase since the 2001 Census.

On Census Day 27 March 2011, in Belfast Local Government District (2014), considering the resident population:

- 96.77% were white (including Irish Traveller) while 3.23% were from an ethnic minority population;
- 48.82% belong to or were brought up in the Catholic faith and 42.47% belong to or were brought up in a 'Protestant and Other Christian (including Christian related)' denomination; and
- 43.32% indicated that they had a British national identity, 35.10% had an Irish national identity and 26.92% had a Northern Irish national identity.

Respondents could indicate more than one national identity

On Census Day 27 March 2011, in Belfast Local Government District (2014), considering the population aged 3 years old and over:

- 13.45% had some knowledge of Irish;
- 5.23% had some knowledge of Ulster-Scots; and
- 4.34% did not have English as their first language.

On Census Day 27 March 2011, considering the population aged 16 years old and over:

- 25.56% had a degree or higher qualification; while
- 41.21% had no or low (Level 1*) qualifications.

Level 1 is 1–4 O Levels/CSE/GCSE (any grades) or equivalent

On Census Day 27 March 2011, considering the population aged 16 to 74 years old:

- 63.84% were economically active, 36.16% were economically inactive;
- 52.90% were in paid employment; and
- 5.59% were unemployed, of these 43.56% were long-term unemployed.

Long-term unemployed are those who stated that they have not worked since 2009 or earlier

== See also ==
- Lord Mayor of Belfast
- High Sheriff of Belfast
- Local government in Northern Ireland
- List of parks in Northern Ireland
- List of public art in Belfast
