= 2001 Northern Ireland local elections =

- 7 June 2001

All 582 council seats
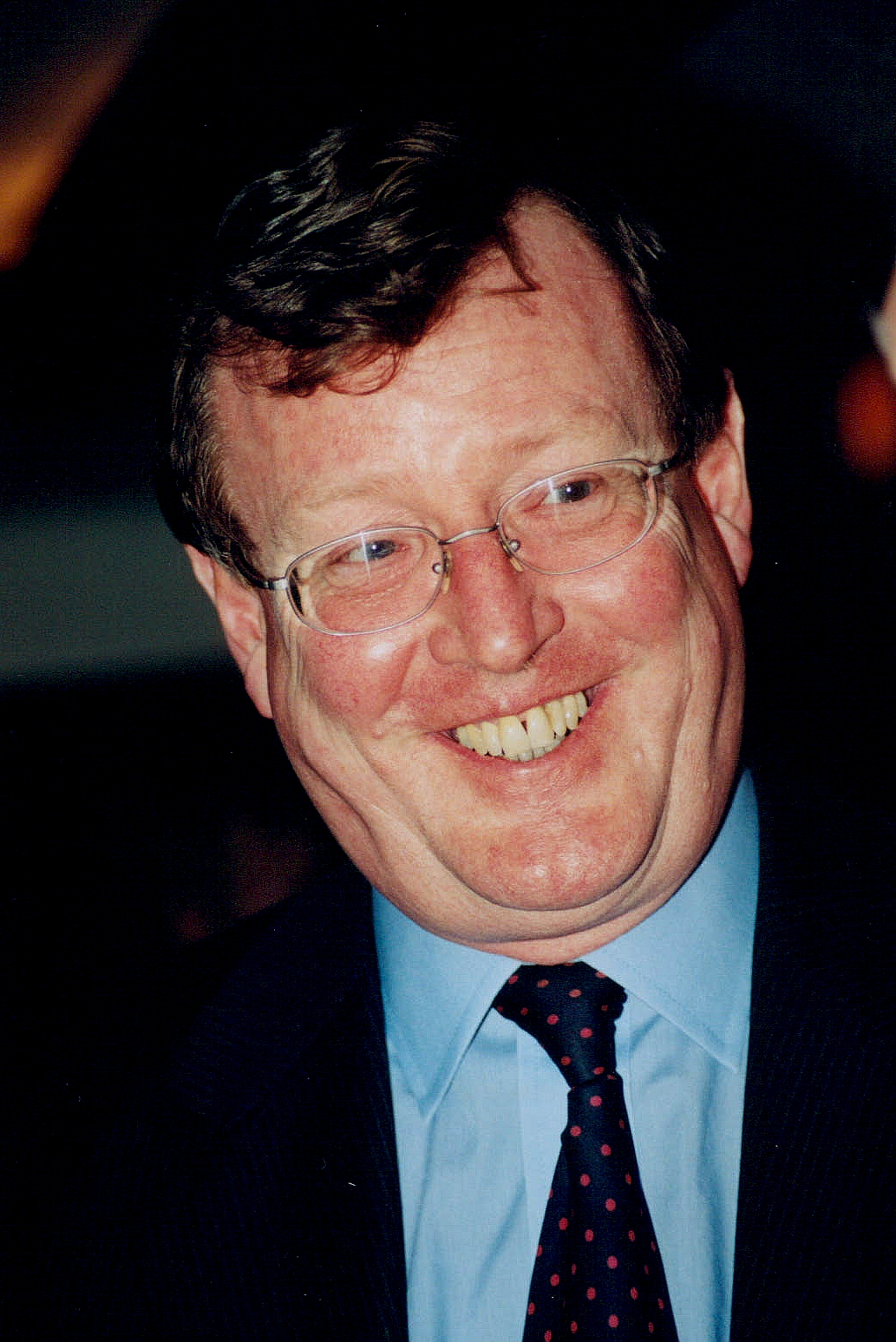

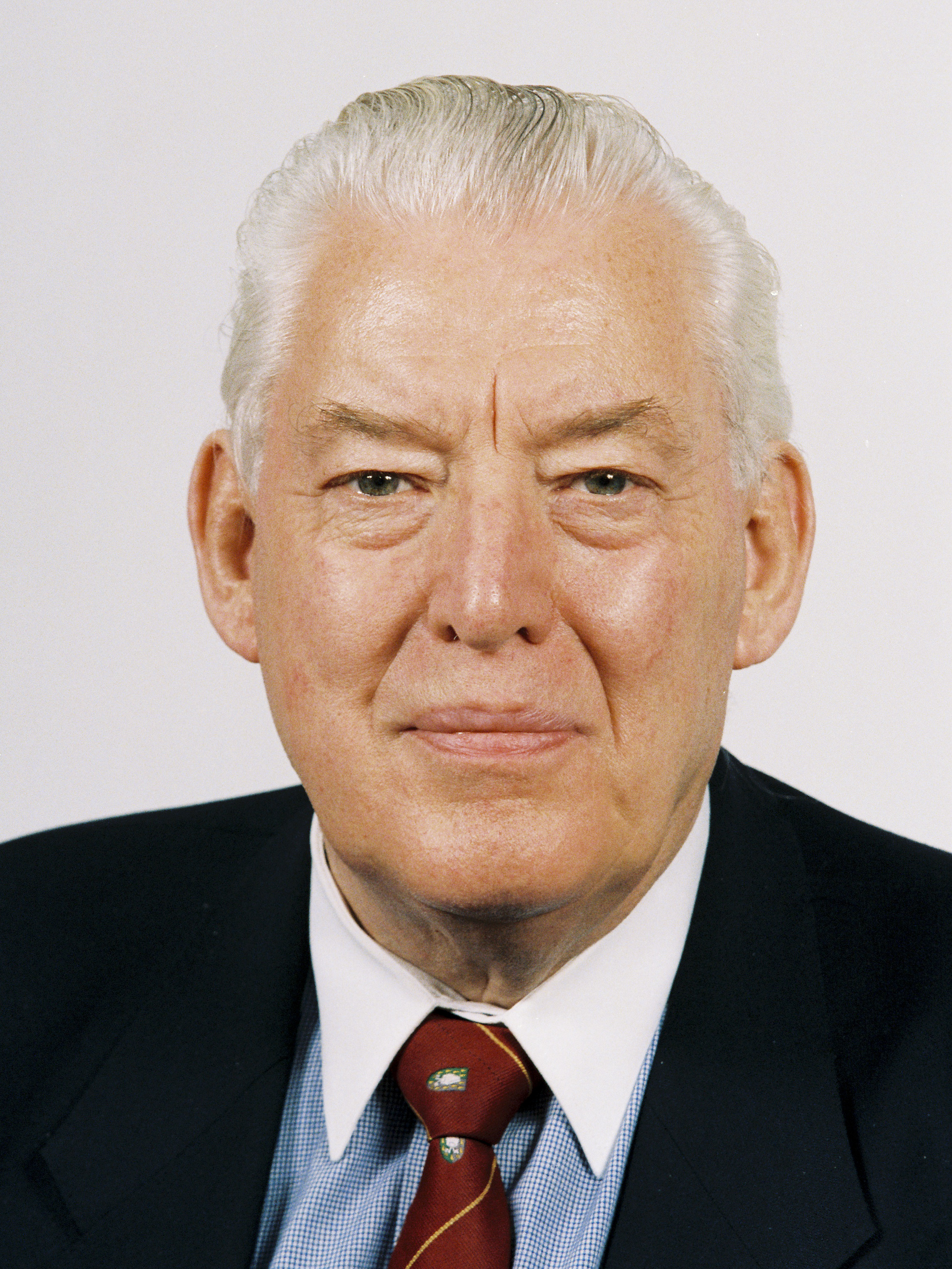

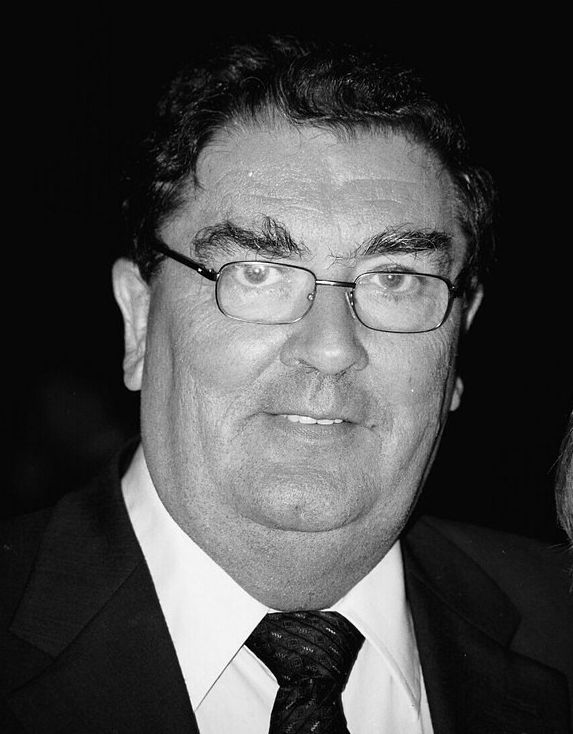

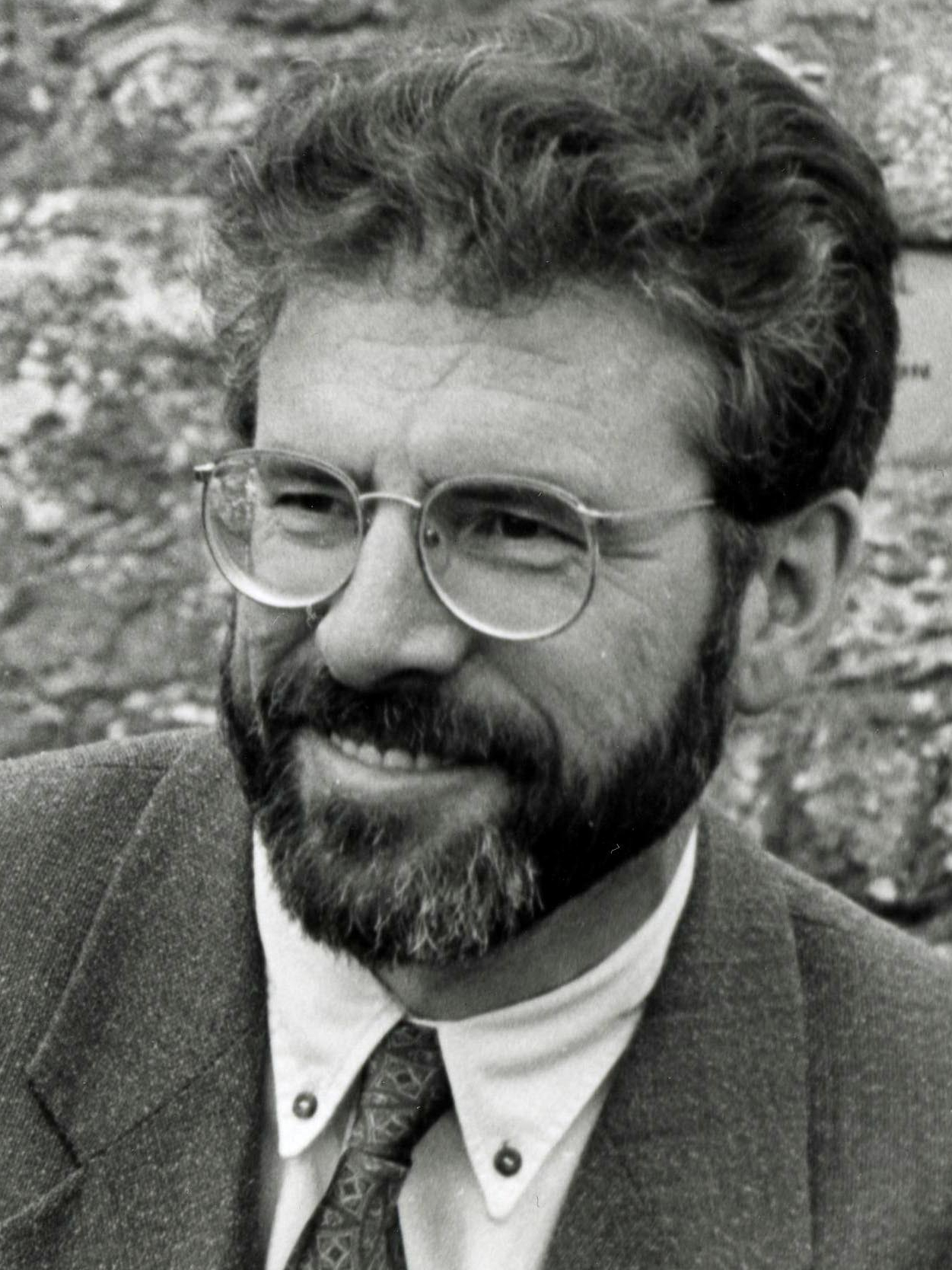

| | First party | Second party | Third party |
|---|---|---|---|
| Leader | David Trimble | Ian Paisley | John Hume |
| Party | UUP | DUP | SDLP |
| Seats won | 154 | 131 | 117 |
| Seat change | ▼31 | ▲40 | ▼3 |
| Popular vote | 181,336 | 169,477 | 153,424 |
| Percentage | 22.9% | 21.4% | 19.4% |
| Swing | ▼5.2% | ▲5.4% | ▼1.6% |
| | Fourth party | Fifth party | Sixth party |
| Leader | Gerry Adams | N/A | Seán Neeson |
| Party | Sinn Féin | Independent | Alliance |
| Seats won | 108 | 34 | 28 |
| Seat change | ▲34 | ▲8 | ▼13 |
| Popular vote | 163,269 | 51,997 | 40,443 |
| Percentage | 20.7% | 6.6% | 5.1% |
| Swing | ▲3.5% | ▲2.8% | ▼1.6% |
- Colours denote the party with a plurality of first preference votes in each District Electoral Area (in darker-coloured DEAs, the party has a majority of first preference votes)

Elections for local government were held in Northern Ireland on 7 June 2001, contesting 582 seats in all, along with the 2001 general election across the entire United Kingdom.

== Results ==
Map showing the party that received the most votes by district electoral area.

=== Overall ===
| Party | Councillors | | Votes | |
| Party | Change | Total | % share | Total |
|---|---|---|---|---|
| UUP | -31 | 154 | 22.94 | 181,336 |
| DUP | +40 | 131 | 21.44 | 169,477 |
| Sinn Féin | +34 | 108 | 20.66 | 163,269 |
| SDLP | -3 | 117 | 19.41 | 153,424 |
| Independent | +8 | 34 | 6.58 | 51,997 |
| Alliance | -13 | 28 | 5.12 | 40,443 |
| PUP | -3 | 4 | 1.55 | 12,261 |
| UK Unionist | -2 | 2 | 0.60 | 4,763 |
| NI Women's Coalition | 0 | 1 | 0.42 | 3,301 |
| United Unionist | +2 | 2 | 0.33 | 2,648 |
| NI Conservatives | -3 | 0 | 0.25 | 1,985 |
| NI Unionist | 0 | 0 | 0.23 | 1,818 |
| Workers' Party | 0 | 0 | 0.18 | 1,421 |
| Independent Community | -2 | 0 | 0.16 | 1,247 |
| Newtownabbey Ratepayers | -1 | 1 | 0.13 | 1,039 |
| Ulster Third Way | 0 | 0 | 0.00 | 28 |

=== By council ===
Where a party is indicated with an asterisk (*) it means the councillor was listed as an independent on the ballot.

| Council | Council Seats by Party | | | | | | | | |
| Council | | | | | | | | | Total |
| Council | Alliance | DUP | PUP | SDLP | SF | UUP | Others | Ind. | Total |
|---|---|---|---|---|---|---|---|---|---|
| Antrim | – | 5 | – | 5 | 2 | 7 | – | – | 19 |
| Ards | 4 | 9 | – | 1 | – | 8 | – | 1 | 23 |
| Armagh | – | 4 | – | 6 | 5 | 7 | – | – | 22 |
| Ballymena | – | 11 | – | 4 | – | 7 | – | 2 | 24 |
| Ballymoney | – | 8 | – | 2 | 1 | 5 | – | – | 16 |
| Banbridge | 1 | 5 | – | 3 | – | 7 | – | 1 | 17 |
| Belfast | 3 | 10 | 3 | 9 | 14 | 11 | 1 UDP* | – | 51 |
| Carrickfergus | 5 | 6 | – | – | – | 4 | – | 2 | 17 |
| Castlereagh | 4 | 10 | 1 | 2 | – | 5 | – | 1 | 23 |
| Coleraine | – | 7 | – | 4 | – | 10 | – | 1 | 22 |
| Cookstown | – | 2 | – | 4 | 6 | 3 | – | 1 | 16 |
| Craigavon | – | 6 | – | 7 | 4 | 8 | – | 1 | 26 |
| Derry | – | 4 | – | 14 | 10 | 2 | – | – | 30 |
| Down | – | 2 | | 10 | 4 | 6 | – | 1 | 23 |
| Dungannon | – | 3 | – | 4 | 8 | 6 | – | 1 | 22 |
| Fermanagh | – | 2 | – | 4 | 9 | 7 | – | 1 | 23 |
| Larne | 2 | 5 | – | 2 | – | 4 | – | 2 | 15 |
| Limavady | – | 2 | – | 4 | 4 | 3 | 1 UUAP | 1 | 15 |
| Lisburn | 3 | 5 | – | 3 | 4 | 13 | 1 UDP* | 1 | 30 |
| Magherafelt | – | 3 | – | 3 | 7 | 2 | – | 1 | 16 |
| Moyle | – | 3 | – | 4 | 1 | 3 | – | 4 | 15 |
| Newry and Mourne | – | 1 | – | 10 | 13 | 4 | – | 2 | 30 |
| Newtownabbey | 1 | 8 | – | 2 | 1 | 9 | 3 (1 UUAP; 1 NR; 1 Lab*) | 1 | 25 |
| North Down | 5 | 5 | | – | – | 8 | 3 (2 UKUP; 1 NIWC) | 4 | 25 |
| Omagh | – | 2 | – | 6 | 8 | 3 | – | 2 | 21 |
| Strabane | – | 3 | – | 4 | 7 | 2 | – | – | 16 |
| Total | 28 | 131 | 4 | 117 | 108 | 154 | 9 | 31 | 582 |
| Change | -13 | +40 | -3 | -3 | +34 | -32 | -10 | -13 | +2 UUAP -3 Con -2 UKU -2 UDP -2 Lab -1 NR -1 DL -1 PS |
| Elected 1997 | 41 | 91 | 7 | 120 | 74 | 186 | 19 | 44 | 4 UKUP 4 UDP; 3 Lab 3 Con; 2 NR 1 NIWC; 1 DL 1 PS |

== Councils ==
=== Antrim ===
Election results, shaded by plurality of First Preference Votes

Antrim North West
| Party | Candidate | 1st Pref |
|---|---|---|
| SDLP | Bobby Loughran | 1,093 |
| DUP | Wilson Clyde | 1,053 |
| Sinn Féin | Martin Meehan | 1,007 |
| SDLP | Donovan McClelland | 678 |
| UUP | Avril Swann | 629 |
| UUP | Stephen Nicholl | 430 |
| NI Unionist | Robert Johnston | 413 |
| Sinn Féin | Joseph McCavana | 384 |
| Alliance | Michael Donoghue | 133 |
| Turnout | | 5,929 |
No change

Antrim South East
| Party | Candidate | 1st Pref |
|---|---|---|
| DUP | Samuel Dunlop | 1,367 |
| SDLP | Thomas Burns | 1,072 |
| UUP | Roy Thompson | 1,062 |
| UUP | Mervyn Rea | 1,042 |
| UUP | Edgar Wallace | 937 |
| Sinn Féin | Martin McManus | 703 |
| Alliance | Alison McCartney | 578 |
| DUP | William Harkness | 525 |
| Independent | Michael McGivern | 393 |
| UUP | Roderick Swann | 213 |
| SDLP | Sean Mallon | 168 |
| Turnout | | 8,257 |
| DUP gain from UUP | | |
| Sinn Féin gain from Alliance | | |

Antrim Town
| Party | Candidate | 1st Pref |
|---|---|---|
| UUP | Paddy Marks | 1,016 |
| DUP | John Smyth | 749 |
| UUP | Adrian Cochrane-Watson | 632 |
| SDLP | Sean McKee | 632 |
| SDLP | Oran Keenan | 611 |
| DUP | Brian Graham | 516 |
| Sinn Féin | Aine Gribbon | 495 |
| UUP | Paul Michael | 470 |
| Alliance | Pete Whitcroft | 406 |
| DUP | Jack McClay | 366 |
| UUP | Drew Ritchie | 268 |
| PUP | Kenneth Wilkinson | 197 |
| Turnout | | 6,553 |
| DUP gain from UUP | | |
| SDLP gain from Alliance | | |

=== Ards ===
Election results, shaded by plurality of First Preference Votes

Ards East (Note: Because only six candidates had been nominated for the six seats, there was no vote and all six candidates were declared elected.)
| Party | Candidate | 1st Pref |
|---|---|---|
| UUP | Terence Williams | N/A |
| UUP | Ronnie Ferguson | N/A |
| DUP | Hamilton Gregory | N/A |
| UUP | John Shields | N/A |
| UUP | Jeffrey Magill | N/A |
| Alliance | Linda Cleland | N/A |
| Turnout | | N/A |
| DUP gain from UUP | | |

Ards Peninsula
| Party | Candidate | 1st Pref |
|---|---|---|
| DUP | Jim Shannon | 1,824 |
| Alliance | Kieran McCarthy | 1,286 |
| SDLP | Daniel McCarthy | 860 |
| UUP | Angus Carson | 710 |
| DUP | Robin Drysdale | 705 |
| Independent | Joseph Boyle | 526 |
| UUP | Paul Carson | 520 |
| Independent | Robbie Ambrose | 255 |
| Independent | James McMullan | 153 |
| Alliance | Stephen McSherry | 35 |
| Turnout | | 7,085 |
No change

Ards West
| Party | Candidate | 1st Pref |
|---|---|---|
| UUP | Robert Gibson | 2,454 |
| DUP | Margaret Craig | 1,230 |
| DUP | William Montgomery | 1,039 |
| Alliance | Jim McBriar | 756 |
| Alliance | Kathleen Coulter | 732 |
| DUP | David Gilmore | 693 |
| UUP | Philip Smith | 625 |
| UUP | Arthur Spence | 311 |
| NI Conservatives | Christopher Connolly | 190 |
| Turnout | | 8,253 |
| Margaret Craig leaves UUP | | |
| DUP gain from Alliance | | |

Newtownards
| Party | Candidate | 1st Pref |
|---|---|---|
| DUP | George Ennis | 1,608 |
| UUP | Tom Hamilton | 1,288 |
| UUP | David Smyth | 1,060 |
| Independent | Wilbert Magill | 889 |
| Alliance | Alan McDowell | 859 |
| DUP | Bobby McBride | 671 |
| DUP | Hamilton Lawther | 363 |
| Independent | Nancy Orr | 312 |
| Turnout | | 7,268 |
| Wilbert Magill changes designation from Independent Unionist | | |
| DUP gain from Independent Unionist | | |

=== Armagh ===
Election results, shaded by plurality of First Preference Votes

Armagh City
| Party | Candidate | 1st Pref |
|---|---|---|
| Sinn Féin | Patrick McNamee | 1,261 |
| SDLP | Pat Brannigan | 1,013 |
| Sinn Féin | Cathy Rafferty | 901 |
| UUP | Sylvia McRoberts | 868 |
| DUP | Freda Donnelly | 861 |
| Independent | John Nixon | 646 |
| UUP | Gordon Frazer | 528 |
| SDLP | Michael Carson | 456 |
| SDLP | Anna Brolly | 370 |
| SDLP | Mealla Bratton | 325 |
| NI Women's Coalition | Margaret Connolly | 209 |
| Turnout | | 7,608 |
| DUP gain from UUP | | |

Crossmore
| Party | Candidate | 1st Pref |
|---|---|---|
| Sinn Féin | Brian Cunningham | 1,336 |
| SDLP | Tommy Kavanagh | 989 |
| DUP | Noel Berry | 930 |
| UUP | Evelyn Corry | 927 |
| Sinn Féin | Pat O'Rawe | 867 |
| SDLP | James McKernan | 703 |
| SDLP | James Lennon | 554 |
| SDLP | Joseph McGleenan | 452 |
| Turnout | | 6,883 |
| Sinn Féin gain from SDLP | | |

Cusher
| Party | Candidate | 1st Pref |
|---|---|---|
| DUP | Paul Berry | 3,549 |
| UUP | Eric Speers | 1,202 |
| SDLP | Tom Canavan | 1,001 |
| UUP | Robert Turner | 725 |
| UUP | James Clayton | 679 |
| Sinn Féin | Noel Sheridan | 591 |
| UUP | Sharon McClelland | 367 |
| Independent | Derrick Mathews | 186 |
| DUP | Heather Black | 185 |
| DUP | Mervyn Spratt | 103 |
| Turnout | | 8,728 |
| DUP gain from UUP | | |

The Orchard
| Party | Candidate | 1st Pref |
|---|---|---|
| DUP | Brian Hutchinson | 1,363 |
| UUP | Jim Speers | 1,324 |
| Sinn Féin | Paul Corrigan | 1,221 |
| SDLP | John Campbell | 796 |
| DUP | William Irwin | 686 |
| SDLP | Eamon Mcneill | 651 |
| UUP | Charles Rollston | 645 |
| UUP | Olive Whitten | 492 |
| Turnout | | 7,295 |
| Sinn Féin gain from UUP | | |

=== Ballymena ===
Election results, shaded by plurality of First Preference Votes

Ballymena North
| Party | Candidate | 1st Pref |
|---|---|---|
| DUP | James Alexander | 1,110 |
| SDLP | Patrick McAvoy | 1,071 |
| Independent | James Henry | 1,060 |
| DUP | Maurice Mills | 625 |
| UUP | Joe McKernan | 613 |
| Independent | William Wright | 553 |
| UUP | Neill Armstrong | 533 |
| UUP | Gillian Scott | 532 |
| DUP | Simon Hamilton | 411 |
| Sinn Féin | Gerard Magee | 382 |
| Alliance | Jayne Dunlop | 317 |
| Independent | Audrey Wales | 263 |
| UUP | William McElfatrick | 242 |
| PUP | Trevor Parkhill | 30 |
| Turnout | | 7,876 |
| William Wright leaves UUP | | |
| DUP gain from Alliance | | |

Ballymena South
| Party | Candidate | 1st Pref |
|---|---|---|
| SDLP | Declan O'Loan | 1,212 |
| UUP | James Currie | 1,092 |
| DUP | Elizabeth Adger | 1,061 |
| DUP | Davy Tweed | 1,018 |
| DUP | Martin Clarke | 790 |
| DUP | Hubert Nicholl | 755 |
| UUP | Peter Brown | 459 |
| DUP | William Moore | 285 |
| Independent | David Warwick | 241 |
| PUP | William McCaughey | 51 |
| PUP | Jean Rainey | 43 |
| Turnout | | 7,146 |
| DUP gain from UUP | | |

Bannside
| Party | Candidate | 1st Pref |
|---|---|---|
| DUP | Roy Gillespie | 1,427 |
| UUP | William McNeilly | 1,060 |
| DUP | Tommy Nicholl | 962 |
| SDLP | Seamus Laverty | 938 |
| DUP | Samuel Gaston | 890 |
| DUP | David Wilkinson | 842 |
| UUP | Samuel McClean | 727 |
| SDLP | Joseph Montgomery | 375 |
| NI Unionist | Norman Sloan | 186 |
| PUP | Kenneth McCaughey | 53 |
| Turnout | | 7,612 |
| SDLP gain from UUP | | |

Braid
| Party | Candidate | 1st Pref |
|---|---|---|
| DUP | Sam Hanna | 1,242 |
| SDLP | Margaret Gribben | 1,158 |
| UUP | David Clyde | 961 |
| UUP | Lexie Scott | 893 |
| DUP | Robin Stirling | 819 |
| UUP | Des Armstrong | 815 |
| DUP | Robert Osborne | 707 |
| PUP | Robert Hamilton | 29 |
| Turnout | | 6,712 |
| DUP gain from UUP | | |

=== Ballymoney ===
Election results, shaded by plurality of First Preference Votes

Ballymoney Town
| Party | Candidate | 1st Pref |
|---|---|---|
| DUP | Cecil Cousley | 788 |
| SDLP | Justin McCamphill | 459 |
| DUP | Ian Stevenson | 433 |
| DUP | Robert Storey | 429 |
| UUP | Thomas McKeown | 396 |
| Independent | Jim Wright | 376 |
| UUP | James Simpson | 351 |
| UUP | William Johnston | 257 |
| Independent | Jeffrey Balmer | 125 |
| Independent | Anne Logan | 119 |
| Turnout | | 3,803 |
| UUP gain from Independent | | |
| DUP gain from Independent | | |

Bann Valley
| Party | Candidate | 1st Pref |
|---|---|---|
| Sinn Féin | Philip McGuigan | 1,123 |
| DUP | John Finlay | 859 |
| UUP | Joe Gaston | 711 |
| DUP | Robert Halliday | 675 |
| SDLP | Malachy McCamphill | 663 |
| DUP | Robert Wilson | 540 |
| SDLP | Pappy O'Kane | 388 |
| UUP | John Watt | 261 |
| Turnout | | 5,342 |
| DUP gain from UUP | | |

Bushvale
| Party | Candidate | 1st Pref |
|---|---|---|
| DUP | Bill Kennedy | 997 |
| DUP | Frank Campbell | 589 |
| SDLP | Harry Connolly | 548 |
| UUP | John Ramsay | 545 |
| UUP | William Logan | 457 |
| Sinn Féin | Sean McErlain | 318 |
| SDLP | Frank McCluskey | 151 |
| Turnout | | 3,681 |
| UUP gain from SDLP | | |

=== Banbridge ===
Election results, shaded by plurality of First Preference Votes

Banbridge Town
| Party | Candidate | 1st Pref |
|---|---|---|
| UUP | Joan Baird | 1,979 |
| SDLP | Patrick McAleenan | 1,404 |
| DUP | Jim McElroy | 774 |
| DUP | Kyle Ferguson | 697 |
| UUP | Ian Burns | 485 |
| UUP | William Bell | 458 |
| Independent | Frank Downey | 448 |
| Alliance | Frank McQuaid | 420 |
| UK Unionist | David Hudson | 389 |
| Turnout | | 7,172 |
| Alliance gain from Independent | | |

Dromore
| Party | Candidate | 1st Pref |
|---|---|---|
| DUP | Paul Rankin | 1,375 |
| SDLP | Cassie McDermott | 1,202 |
| DUP | David Herron | 1,032 |
| UUP | Norah Beare | 896 |
| UUP | William Martin | 894 |
| UUP | Thompson Howe | 685 |
| NI Unionist | Joseph McIlwaine | 45 |
| Turnout | | 6,232 |
| DUP gain from UUP | | |

Knockiveagh
| Party | Candidate | 1st Pref |
|---|---|---|
| SDLP | Seamus Doyle | 1,351 |
| UUP | John Ingram | 1,202 |
| DUP | Wilfred McFadden | 1,084 |
| Independent | Malachy McCartan | 768 |
| Sinn Féin | Brendan Curran | 755 |
| DUP | Stephen Herron | 735 |
| UUP | John Hanna | 617 |
| UUP | Violet Cromie | 486 |
| UK Unionist | Stephen Briggs | 387 |
| Turnout | | 7,493 |
| DUP gain from UUP | | |

=== Belfast ===
Election results, shaded by plurality of First Preference Votes

Balmoral
| Party | Candidate | 1st Pref |
|---|---|---|
| SDLP | Carmel Hanna | 3,077 |
| UUP | Margaret Crooks | 2,276 |
| UUP | Bob Stoker | 2,032 |
| Alliance | Tom Ekin | 1,684 |
| DUP | Ruth Patterson | 1,377 |
| Sinn Féin | Stiofán Long | 1,349 |
| SDLP | Catherine Molloy | 987 |
| PUP | Tom Morrow | 424 |
| UUP | John Hiddleston | 411 |
| Turnout | | 13,873 |
No change

Castle
| Party | Candidate | 1st Pref |
|---|---|---|
| DUP | Nigel Dodds | 3,949 |
| SDLP | Alban Maginness | 2,520 |
| Sinn Féin | Danny Lavery | 1,991 |
| UUP | David Browne | 1,550 |
| SDLP | Pat Convery | 1,403 |
| Alliance | Tom Campbell | 984 |
| DUP | Ian Crozier | 759 |
| PUP | Janet Carson | 352 |
| NI Women's Coalition | Elizabeth McCullough | 253 |
| Independent | David Mahood | 178 |
| Independent | Sandy Blair | 109 |
| Workers' Party | Marcella Delaney | 84 |
| Turnout | | 14,497 |
| DUP gain from UUP | | |
| SDLP gain from Alliance | | |

Court
| Party | Candidate | 1st Pref |
|---|---|---|
| DUP | Eric Smyth | 2,605 |
| Independent | Frank McCoubrey | 1,732 |
| UUP | Chris McGimpsey | 1,527 |
| PUP | Hugh Smyth | 1,336 |
| PUP | Plum Smith | 813 |
| UUP | Fred Cobain | 722 |
| DUP | Elaine McMillen | 720 |
| Sinn Féin | Mick Conlon | 269 |
| Ulster Third Way | David Kerr | 28 |
| Turnout | | 10,085 |
| DUP gain from UUP | | |
| Independent gain from UDP | | |

Laganbank
| Party | Candidate | 1st Pref |
|---|---|---|
| UUP | Michael McGimpsey | 2,019 |
| Sinn Féin | Alex Maskey | 1,748 |
| SDLP | Peter O'Reilly | 1,612 |
| SDLP | Patrick McCarthy | 1,511 |
| DUP | Richard Scott | 882 |
| Alliance | Mark Long | 825 |
| UUP | Jim Clarke | 819 |
| NI Women's Coalition | Anne Monaghan | 703 |
| PUP | Dawn Purvis | 286 |
| Workers' Party | Patrick Lynn | 158 |
| Independent | Andrew Frew | 141 |
| Independent | Barbara Muldoon | 128 |
| Turnout | | 11,082 |
| SDLP gain from Alliance | | |

Lower Falls
| Party | Candidate | 1st Pref |
|---|---|---|
| Sinn Féin | Fra McCann | 2,399 |
| Sinn Féin | Tom Hartley | 2,351 |
| Sinn Féin | Máire Cush | 2,230 |
| SDLP | Margaret Walsh | 2,016 |
| Sinn Féin | Marie Moore | 1,917 |
| Sinn Féin | Seán McKnight | 1,247 |
| Workers' Party | John Lowry | 488 |
| Turnout | | 13,229 |
No change

Oldpark
| Party | Candidate | 1st Pref |
|---|---|---|
| Sinn Féin | Gerard Brophy | 2,755 |
| Sinn Féin | Margaret McCleneghan | 2,467 |
| DUP | Nelson McCausland | 2,392 |
| SDLP | Martin Morgan | 1,932 |
| PUP | Billy Hutchinson | 1,516 |
| Sinn Féin | Kathy Stanton | 1,298 |
| UUP | Fred Proctor | 1,116 |
| SDLP | Joleen Connolly | 1,114 |
| Sinn Féin | Eoin O'Broin | 957 |
| Independent | James Bates | 209 |
| Alliance | Thomas McCullough | 160 |
| Independent | Rene Greig | 59 |
| Turnout | | 16,662 |
| DUP gain from UUP | | |

Pottinger
| Party | Candidate | 1st Pref |
|---|---|---|
| DUP | Sammy Wilson | 3,918 |
| UUP | Reg Empey | 3,097 |
| PUP | David Ervine | 1,582 |
| Sinn Féin | Joseph O'Donnell | 1,264 |
| Alliance | Mervyn Jones | 693 |
| DUP | May Campbell | 577 |
| UUP | Margaret Clarke | 559 |
| SDLP | Leo Van Es | 459 |
| Independent | John Bushell | 218 |
| DUP | Harry Toan | 205 |
| Workers' Party | Joseph Bell | 129 |
| PUP | Robin Stewart | 127 |
| UK Unionist | David Fairfield | 74 |
| NI Conservatives | Jason Docherty | 66 |
| Turnout | | 13,426 |
| Sinn Féin gain from Alliance | | |

Upper Falls
| Party | Candidate | 1st Pref |
|---|---|---|
| Sinn Féin | Paul Maskey | 3,349 |
| SDLP | Alex Attwood | 3,260 |
| Sinn Féin | Gerard O'Neill | 2,866 |
| Sinn Féin | Michael Browne | 2,469 |
| Sinn Féin | Chrissie McAuley | 1,801 |
| SDLP | Brian Heading | 1,112 |
| NI Women's Coalition | Mary Catney | 365 |
| Alliance | Kathy Ayers | 136 |
| Turnout | | 15,972 |
No change

Victoria
| Party | Candidate | 1st Pref |
|---|---|---|
| UUP | Ian Adamson | 3,286 |
| Alliance | David Alderdice | 3,119 |
| DUP | Wallace Browne | 2,492 |
| UUP | Jim Rodgers | 2,322 |
| DUP | Robin Newton | 1,469 |
| DUP | Margaret McKenzie | 783 |
| Independent | Danny Dow | 746 |
| Alliance | Naomi Long | 729 |
| PUP | Robert Moorehead | 697 |
| UUP | Alan Crowe | 582 |
| SDLP | Ciara Patricia Farren | 305 |
| NI Conservatives | Peter Gray | 239 |
| Independent | Sammy Walker | 114 |
| Independent | Billy Hands | 15 |
| Independent | Lawrence John | 11 |
| Turnout | | 14,806 |
| UUP gain from Independent Unionist | | |

=== Carrickfergus ===
Election results, shaded by plurality of First Preference Votes

Carrick Castle
| Party | Candidate | 1st Pref |
|---|---|---|
| DUP | David Hilditch | 996 |
| Alliance | Sean Neeson | 662 |
| Independent | William Hamilton | 552 |
| UUP | Darin Ferguson | 435 |
| Independent | William Cameron | 303 |
| PUP | David Beck | 259 |
| Independent | Nicholas Wady | 134 |
| DUP | Patricia McKinney | 130 |
| Alliance | Margaret Hawkins | 112 |
| Turnout | | 3,675 |
| DUP gain from Independent | | |

Kilroot
| Party | Candidate | 1st Pref |
|---|---|---|
| DUP | William Ashe | 1,425 |
| Ind. Unionist | James Brown | 1,275 |
| UUP | Eric Ferguson | 1,093 |
| Alliance | Janet Crampsey | 807 |
| Alliance | Robin Cavan | 684 |
| Independent | Samuel Crowe | 470 |
| DUP | Robert Clements | 430 |
| Turnout | | 6,329 |
| DUP gain from Independent | | |

Knockagh Monument
| Party | Candidate | 1st Pref |
|---|---|---|
| UUP | Roy Beggs Jr | 1,575 |
| DUP | May Beattie | 1,420 |
| Alliance | Stewart Dickson | 1,165 |
| UUP | Gwendoline Wilson | 625 |
| DUP | James McClurg | 336 |
| Alliance | Noreen McIlwrath | 199 |
| PUP | Carolyn Howarth | 166 |
| Turnout | | 5,790 |
| DUP gain from Independent | | |

=== Castlereagh ===
Election results, shaded by plurality of First Preference Votes

Castlereagh Central
| Party | Candidate | 1st Pref |
|---|---|---|
| DUP | Peter Robinson | 2,841 |
| UUP | Michael Copeland | 1,032 |
| Alliance | Michael Long | 769 |
| PUP | Tommy Sandford | 505 |
| SDLP | Sean Mullan | 427 |
| DUP | Joanne Bunting | 302 |
| UK Unionist | Grant Dillon | 289 |
| Independent | Alan Carson | 219 |
| DUP | John Norris | 161 |
| NI Conservatives | Terence Dick | 82 |
| DUP | John Dunn | 74 |
| Turnout | | 6,938 |
| PUP gain from UKUP | | |

Castlereagh East
| Party | Candidate | 1st Pref |
|---|---|---|
| DUP | Iris Robinson | 4,093 |
| UUP | David Drysdale | 1,879 |
| Alliance | Peter Osborne | 923 |
| Independent | Francis Gallagher | 650 |
| PUP | Richard Johnston | 466 |
| Alliance | Gillian Graham | 400 |
| Independent | William Abraham | 245 |
| DUP | Claire Ennis | 204 |
| DUP | Kim Morton | 120 |
| DUP | Sandy Geddis | 92 |
| DUP | Jim White | 87 |
| Turnout | | 9,408 |
| Independent gain from Independent | | |

Castlereagh South
| Party | Candidate | 1st Pref |
|---|---|---|
| UUP | Michael Henderson | 1,725 |
| DUP | John Beattie | 1,590 |
| Alliance | Geraldine Rice | 1,019 |
| SDLP | Christine Copeland | 949 |
| SDLP | Brian Hanvey | 940 |
| DUP | Andrew Ramsey | 509 |
| UUP | Barbara McBurney | 431 |
| Sinn Féin | Sean Hayes | 396 |
| Alliance | Margaret Marshall | 381 |
| NI Conservatives | Roger Lomas | 52 |
| Turnout | | 8,151 |
No change

Castlereagh West
| Party | Candidate | 1st Pref |
|---|---|---|
| DUP | Mark Robinson | 1,858 |
| UUP | Cecil Hall | 1,728 |
| SDLP | Rosaleen Hughes | 1,196 |
| Alliance | Sara Duncan | 1,130 |
| NI Women's Coalition | Eileen Cairnduff | 306 |
| PUP | Frederick Ferguson | 301 |
| Sinn Féin | Sean Montgomery | 158 |
| DUP | Charles Tosh | 92 |
| DUP | Vivienne Stevenson | 61 |
| Turnout | | 6,994 |
No change

=== Coleraine ===
Election results, shaded by plurality of First Preference Votes

Bann
| Party | Candidate | 1st Pref |
|---|---|---|
| SDLP | John Dallat | 1,714 |
| DUP | Adrian McQuillan | 1,216 |
| UUP | Olive Church | 986 |
| UUP | William King | 821 |
| UUP | Jim Watt | 704 |
| SDLP | Eamon Mullan | 535 |
| Independent | Robert Bolton | 514 |
| Independent | Reginald McAuley | 512 |
| DUP | Hazel Sommers | 265 |
| Alliance | Yvonne Boyle | 116 |
| Turnout | | 7,543 |
No change

Coleraine Central
| Party | Candidate | 1st Pref |
|---|---|---|
| DUP | James McClure | 1,426 |
| UUP | David McClarty | 1,395 |
| SDLP | Gerald McLaughlin | 1,232 |
| UUP | Elizabeth Johnston | 1,016 |
| UUP | David Barbour | 717 |
| DUP | Timothy Deans | 699 |
| Alliance | Eamon O'Hara | 508 |
| Turnout | | 7,130 |
| DUP gain from Alliance | | |

Coleraine East
| Party | Candidate | 1st Pref |
|---|---|---|
| DUP | Maurice Bradley | 1,389 |
| UUP | Elizabeth Black | 808 |
| DUP | William Creelman | 596 |
| UUP | Robert McPherson | 460 |
| SDLP | John Montgomery | 368 |
| Independent | Thomas Houston | 319 |
| Alliance | Paddy McGowan | 274 |
| Independent | Alistair Crawford | 149 |
| PUP | David Gilmour | 146 |
| Independent | Martin Hunter | 126 |
| DUP | Ellen Fielding | 118 |
| Turnout | | 4,862 |
| DUP gain from Alliance | | |

The Skerries
| Party | Candidate | 1st Pref |
|---|---|---|
| SDLP | Billy Leonard | 988 |
| Independent | Christine Alexander | 757 |
| UUP | Pauline Armitage | 729 |
| Alliance | Barbara Dempsey | 681 |
| DUP | Robert Stewart | 675 |
| UUP | Norman Hillis | 625 |
| UUP | Samuel Kane | 552 |
| DUP | Alexander Gilkinson | 359 |
| Turnout | | 5,451 |
| SDLP gain from Alliance | | |

=== Cookstown ===
Election results, shaded by plurality of First Preference Votes

Ballinderry
| Party | Candidate | 1st Pref |
|---|---|---|
| SDLP | Patsy McGlone | 1,771 |
| Sinn Féin | Patrick McAleer | 1,567 |
| DUP | Anne McCrea | 969 |
| UUP | Walter Greer | 946 |
| Sinn Féin | Michael McIvor | 656 |
| SDLP | Mary Baker | 641 |
| DUP | Samuel McCartney | 537 |
| UUP | William McCollum | 334 |
| Turnout | | 7,576 |
No change

Cookstown Central
| Party | Candidate | 1st Pref |
|---|---|---|
| Sinn Féin | John McNamee | 1,427 |
| UUP | Trevor Wilson | 1,323 |
| DUP | Ian McCrea | 1,064 |
| SDLP | Peter Cassidy | 792 |
| Sinn Féin | Seamus Campbell | 364 |
| SDLP | Eddie Espie | 328 |
| UUP | Albert Crawford | 238 |
| DUP | Hugh Davidson | 120 |
| Turnout | | 5,774 |
| Sinn Féin gain from UUP | | |

Drum Manor
| Party | Candidate | 1st Pref |
|---|---|---|
| Sinn Féin | Desmond Grimes | 1,233 |
| UUP | Samuel Glasgow | 1,118 |
| Sinn Féin | Oliver Molloy | 969 |
| SDLP | James McGarvey | 884 |
| DUP | Alice Lees | 756 |
| Independent | Samuel Parke | 689 |
| Turnout | | 5,736 |
| Samuel Parke changes designation from Independent Unionist | | |

=== Craigavon ===
Election results, shaded by plurality of First Preference Votes

Craigavon Central
| Party | Candidate | 1st Pref |
|---|---|---|
| UUP | Kenneth Twyble | 1,694 |
| Sinn Féin | Francis Murray | 1,198 |
| DUP | Woolsey Smith | 1,060 |
| SDLP | Pat Mallon | 996 |
| DUP | Robert Smith | 810 |
| UUP | Frederick Crowe | 802 |
| Independent | David Calvert | 761 |
| SDLP | Kieran Corr | 745 |
| DUP | Denis Watson | 712 |
| Sinn Féin | Peter Toland | 602 |
| UUP | Samuel McCammick | 396 |
| Alliance | Sean Hagan | 379 |
| UUP | Audrey Lindsay | 250 |
| Workers' Party | Tom French | 132 |
| Independent | Alan Evans | 96 |
| Turnout | | 10,887 |
| SDLP gain from Alliance | | |
| DUP gain from UUP | | |

Loughside
| Party | Candidate | 1st Pref |
|---|---|---|
| SDLP | Dolores Kelly | 2,022 |
| Sinn Féin | John O'Dowd | 1,971 |
| Sinn Féin | Maurice Magill | 1,131 |
| SDLP | Sean McKavanagh | 1,055 |
| Sinn Féin | Mairead O'Dowd | 883 |
| SDLP | Mary McAlinden | 735 |
| UUP | William Lindsay | 433 |
| SDLP | Kieran McGeown | 360 |
| DUP | Alexander Dougan | 261 |
| Turnout | | 9,106 |
| Sinn Féin gain from SDLP | | |

Lurgan
| Party | Candidate | 1st Pref |
|---|---|---|
| DUP | Jonathan Bell | 1,942 |
| UUP | Sam Gardiner | 1,728 |
| DUP | Stephen Moutray | 1,555 |
| UUP | George Savage | 1,237 |
| UUP | Meta Crozier | 965 |
| SDLP | Mary McNally | 801 |
| UUP | Sydney Cairns | 749 |
| Sinn Féin | Matthew Rooney | 719 |
| UK Unionist | David Vance | 408 |
| UUP | William Tate | 276 |
| Independent | William Grafton | 130 |
| Turnout | | 10,746 |
| DUP gain from UUP | | |

Portadown
| Party | Candidate | 1st Pref |
|---|---|---|
| DUP | David Simpson | 2,352 |
| Sinn Féin | Brian McKeown | 1,348 |
| SDLP | Ignatius Fox | 1,233 |
| Independent | David Jones | 971 |
| UUP | Sidney Anderson | 883 |
| UUP | George Hatch | 872 |
| Sinn Féin | Noel Mercer | 604 |
| UUP | Mark Neale | 462 |
| UUP | David Thompson | 380 |
| Alliance | William Ramsay | 266 |
| DUP | Alan Carson | 213 |
| DUP | John Tate | 67 |
| Turnout | | 9,894 |
| DUP gain from UUP | | |
| Sinn Féin gain from Independent Nationalist | | |
| Independent gain from Independent Nationalist | | |

=== Derry ===
Election results, shaded by plurality of First Preference Votes

Cityside
| Party | Candidate | 1st Pref |
|---|---|---|
| SDLP | Pat Ramsey | 1,210 |
| SDLP | James Clifford | 1,176 |
| Sinn Féin | Cathal Crumley | 1,093 |
| Sinn Féin | Jim Anderson | 989 |
| Sinn Féin | Barney O'Hagan | 684 |
| SDLP | Liam Boyle | 629 |
| Sinn Féin | Donncha MacNiallais | 618 |
| Independent | Shauna Deery | 228 |
| Turnout | | 6,930 |
No change

Northland
| Party | Candidate | 1st Pref |
|---|---|---|
| SDLP | Kathleen McCloskey | 1,528 |
| SDLP | John Kerr | 1,248 |
| Sinn Féin | Maeve McLaughlin | 1,240 |
| SDLP | Sean Carr | 1,157 |
| Sinn Féin | William Page | 1,130 |
| SDLP | Helen Quigley | 1,087 |
| Sinn Féin | Mary Nelis | 980 |
| Sinn Féin | Gerry MacLochlainn | 938 |
| SDLP | Joseph McClintock | 922 |
| Independent | William Temple | 407 |
| Independent | Colm Bryce | 274 |
| Independent | Daniel Bradley | 82 |
| Independent | Queenie Harper | 14 |
| Turnout | | 11,330 |
| Sinn Féin gain from SDLP | | |

Rural
| Party | Candidate | 1st Pref |
|---|---|---|
| DUP | William Hay | 1,511 |
| SDLP | Annie Courtney | 1,444 |
| SDLP | Thomas Conway | 1,274 |
| UUP | Andrew Davidson | 1,074 |
| Sinn Féin | Paul Fleming | 943 |
| DUP | Bill Irwin | 879 |
| SDLP | Jim McKeever | 796 |
| Sinn Féin | James Kelly | 677 |
| UUP | Ernest Hamilton | 544 |
| SDLP | Brenda Stevenson | 511 |
| Alliance | Brian Kelly | 166 |
| Turnout | | 10,051 |
| Sinn Féin gain from UUP | | |

Shantallow
| Party | Candidate | 1st Pref |
|---|---|---|
| SDLP | Mary Bradley | 2,304 |
| SDLP | Shaun Gallagher | 1,287 |
| Sinn Féin | Gearoid O'Heara | 1,238 |
| Sinn Féin | Tony Hassan | 1,237 |
| SDLP | William O'Connell | 1,135 |
| Sinn Féin | Oliver Green | 1,084 |
| SDLP | Ciaran O'Doherty | 1,017 |
| Independent | Charles McDaid | 542 |
| Sinn Féin | Jean McGinty | 384 |
| Turnout | | 10,544 |
No change

Waterside
| Party | Candidate | 1st Pref |
|---|---|---|
| DUP | Gregory Campbell | 1,887 |
| SDLP | Gerard Diver | 1,330 |
| DUP | Joe Miller | 1,218 |
| UUP | Mary Hamilton | 982 |
| Sinn Féin | Lynn Fleming | 974 |
| SDLP | Anne Marie McDaid | 817 |
| DUP | Mildred Garfield | 710 |
| DUP | Drew Thompson | 669 |
| Independent | Jim Guy | 484 |
| UUP | James McCorkill | 361 |
| Sinn Féin | Francis O'Deorain | 338 |
| Alliance | Colm Cavanagh | 270 |
| PUP | Catherine Cooke | 153 |
| UUP | Gordon Hill | 98 |
| Independent | William Webster | 63 |
| Turnout | | 10,580 |
| SDLP gain from Independent Unionist | | |

=== Down ===
Election results, shaded by plurality of First Preference Votes

Ballynahinch
| Party | Candidate | 1st Pref |
|---|---|---|
| SDLP | Patrick Toman | 1,150 |
| SDLP | Anne McAleenan | 962 |
| Sinn Féin | Francis Branniff | 937 |
| DUP | Jim Wells | 862 |
| UUP | Harvey Bicker | 790 |
| UUP | John Cochrane | 674 |
| DUP | William Alexander | 593 |
| SDLP | Francis Casement | 592 |
| UUP | John Reid | 182 |
| DUP | Alan McIlroy | 126 |
| Turnout | | 7,005 |
| Sinn Féin gain from SDLP | | |

Downpatrick
| Party | Candidate | 1st Pref |
|---|---|---|
| Sinn Féin | Eamonn McConvey | 1,147 |
| SDLP | Peter Craig | 1,077 |
| SDLP | Dermot Curran | 1,024 |
| SDLP | John Doris | 852 |
| SDLP | Ann Trainor | 849 |
| Independent | Raymond Blaney | 835 |
| UUP | Jack McIlheron | 782 |
| Sinn Féin | Liam Johnston | 633 |
| SDLP | Gerard Mahon | 404 |
| SDLP | John Irvine | 233 |
| DUP | John Foster | 203 |
| Independent | Patrick O'Connor | 173 |
| Workers' Party | Desmond O'Hagan | 115 |
| Independent | Helen Honeyman | 101 |
| Turnout | | 8,666 |
| Independent gain from SDLP | | |

Newcastle
| Party | Candidate | 1st Pref |
|---|---|---|
| SDLP | Eamon O'Neill | 1,308 |
| UUP | Gerald Douglas | 1,211 |
| Sinn Féin | William Clarke | 1,163 |
| SDLP | Carmel O'Boyle | 1,000 |
| Sinn Féin | Hugh McDowell | 972 |
| SDLP | Peter Fitzpatrick | 706 |
| DUP | Stanley Priestley | 695 |
| SDLP | Charles McGrath | 438 |
| Independent | David Allister | 243 |
| Turnout | | 7,890 |
| Sinn Féin gain from Women's Coalition | | |

Rowallane
| Party | Candidate | 1st Pref |
|---|---|---|
| SDLP | Margaret Ritchie | 1,440 |
| DUP | William Dick | 1,198 |
| UUP | Robert Burgess | 1,113 |
| UUP | Albert Colmer | 1,027 |
| UUP | Edward Rea | 728 |
| DUP | Billy Walker | 599 |
| Sinn Féin | Anthony Lacken | 304 |
| SDLP | Kathleen Stockton | 279 |
| Independent | James Marks | 169 |
| Turnout | | 6,999 |
No change

=== Dungannon and South Tyrone ===
Election results, shaded by plurality of First Preference Votes

Blackwater
| Party | Candidate | 1st Pref |
|---|---|---|
| Sinn Féin | Phelim Gildernew | 1,032 |
| DUP | Roger Burton | 991 |
| DUP | James Ewing | 985 |
| SDLP | Patsy Daly | 948 |
| UUP | Derek Irwin | 801 |
| UUP | Jim Hamilton | 775 |
| UUP | David Brady | 669 |
| Sinn Féin | Dominic Molloy | 477 |
| Turnout | | 6,785 |
| Sinn Féin gain from UUP | | |

Clogher Valley
| Party | Candidate | 1st Pref |
|---|---|---|
| Sinn Féin | Seamus Flanagan | 1,159 |
| SDLP | Anthony McGonnell | 1,150 |
| UUP | Noel Mulligan | 951 |
| DUP | Johnston McIlwrath | 816 |
| Sinn Féin | Sean McGuigan | 799 |
| UUP | Donald Beatty | 681 |
| DUP | David Robinson | 589 |
| SDLP | Thomas Murphy | 342 |
| Turnout | | 6,614 |
| Sinn Féin gain from UUP | | |

Dungannon Town
| Party | Candidate | 1st Pref |
|---|---|---|
| Sinn Féin | John McLarnon | 1,138 |
| SDLP | Vincent Currie | 1,110 |
| DUP | Maurice Morrow | 873 |
| UUP | Walter Cuddy | 853 |
| Sinn Féin | Barry Monteith | 813 |
| UUP | Ken Maginnis | 740 |
| Independent | Gerry Cullen | 549 |
| DUP | Derek Greenaway | 363 |
| Turnout | | 6,530 |
| Sinn Féin gain from Democratic Left | | |

Torrent
| Party | Candidate | 1st Pref |
|---|---|---|
| Sinn Féin | Francie Molloy | 1,393 |
| Sinn Féin | Michael Gillespie | 1,336 |
| SDLP | Jim Cavanagh | 1,274 |
| Independent | Jim Canning | 1,244 |
| Sinn Féin | Brendan Doris | 985 |
| Sinn Féin | Desmond Donnelly | 944 |
| UUP | Norman Badger | 910 |
| DUP | Robert McFarland | 283 |
| Turnout | | 8,562 |
No change

=== Fermanagh ===
Election results, shaded by plurality of First Preference Votes

Enniskillen
| Party | Candidate | 1st Pref |
|---|---|---|
| UUP | Raymond Ferguson | 1,486 |
| Sinn Féin | Gerry McHugh | 1,339 |
| DUP | Joe Dodds | 1,096 |
| Sinn Féin | Paddy Gilgunn | 1,070 |
| SDLP | Frank Britton | 934 |
| Independent | David Kettyles | 861 |
| SDLP | Eamon Flanagan | 766 |
| UUP | Robert Irvine | 709 |
| UUP | Basil Johnston | 589 |
| UUP | Barbara Stuart | 403 |
| UK Unionist | Alan Madill | 182 |
| DUP | Samuel Dunne | 105 |
| Turnout | | 9,724 |
| Sinn Féin gain from UUP | | |
| David Kettyles changes designation from Progressive Socialist | | |

Erne East
| Party | Candidate | 1st Pref |
|---|---|---|
| Sinn Féin | Ruth Lynch | 1,428 |
| UUP | Harold Andrews | 1,348 |
| SDLP | Fergus McQuillan | 1,293 |
| Sinn Féin | Brian McCaffrey | 1,191 |
| Sinn Féin | Thomas O'Reilly | 1,050 |
| UUP | Cecil Noble | 998 |
| DUP | Paul Robinson | 811 |
| Independent | Michael McPhillips | 559 |
| Turnout | | 8,843 |
| Sinn Féin gain from Independent Nationalist | | |

Erne North
| Party | Candidate | 1st Pref |
|---|---|---|
| Sinn Féin | Joe Cassidy | 1,181 |
| DUP | Bert Johnston | 1,113 |
| UUP | Thomas Elliott | 1,030 |
| SDLP | John O'Kane | 871 |
| UUP | Bertie Kerr | 854 |
| UUP | Caldwell McClaughry | 685 |
| SDLP | Julie Dervan | 568 |
| DUP | Billy Gilmore | 277 |
| DUP | William Simpson | 91 |
| Turnout | | 6,804 |
No change

Erne West
| Party | Candidate | 1st Pref |
|---|---|---|
| SDLP | Gerard Gallagher | 1,578 |
| Sinn Féin | Pat Cox | 1,266 |
| Sinn Féin | Robin Martin | 1,139 |
| Sinn Féin | Stephen Huggett | 1,111 |
| UUP | Wilson Elliott | 981 |
| UUP | Derrick Nixon | 832 |
| DUP | David Black | 392 |
| Turnout | | 7,466 |
| Sinn Féin gain from UUP and Independent | | |

=== Larne ===
Election results, shaded by plurality of First Preference Votes

Coast Road
| Party | Candidate | 1st Pref |
|---|---|---|
| DUP | Winston Fulton | 753 |
| SDLP | Daniel O'Connor | 750 |
| UUP | Joan Drummond | 614 |
| Alliance | Gerardine Mulvenna | 589 |
| DUP | Rachel Rea | 485 |
| UUP | Thomas Robinson | 430 |
| Independent | William Cunning | 379 |
| Sinn Féin | Martin Graffin | 305 |
| Turnout | | 4,404 |
| DUP gain from UUP | | |
| Alliance gain from Independent | | |

Larne Lough
| Party | Candidate | 1st Pref |
|---|---|---|
| DUP | Bobby McKee | 1,314 |
| UUP | Roy Beggs | 1,248 |
| Alliance | John Mathews | 1,171 |
| DUP | Gregg McKeen | 492 |
| UUP | David Fleck | 374 |
| UUP | John Hall | 329 |
| Independent | William Small | 151 |
| Turnout | | 5,233 |
| DUP gain from UUP | | |

Larne Town
| Party | Candidate | 1st Pref |
|---|---|---|
| UUP | James Dunn | 804 |
| DUP | Jack McKee | 776 |
| SDLP | Martin Wilson | 570 |
| Independent | Roy Craig | 390 |
| Independent | Lindsay Mason | 389 |
| Independent | William Adams | 327 |
| Independent | John Anderson | 292 |
| Alliance | Margaret Richmond | 239 |
| Sinn Féin | Janette Graffin | 191 |
| UUP | Andrew Wilson | 185 |
| DUP | Alastair Holden | 165 |
| PUP | William Adamson | 107 |
| Turnout | | 4,524 |
| SDLP gain from Independent | | |

=== Limavady ===
Election results, shaded by plurality of First Preference Votes

Bellarena
| Party | Candidate | 1st Pref |
|---|---|---|
| DUP | Joseph Cubitt | 1,027 |
| SDLP | Michael Carten | 845 |
| Sinn Féin | Martin McGuigan | 833 |
| SDLP | Gerry Mullan | 721 |
| UUP | Edwin Stevenson | 707 |
| SDLP | John McKinney | 685 |
| UUP | William Smyth | 641 |
| Turnout | | 5,527 |
| DUP gain from UUP | | |
| Sinn Féin gain from SDLP | | |

Benbradagh
| Party | Candidate | 1st Pref |
|---|---|---|
| Sinn Féin | Anne Brolly | 1,056 |
| Sinn Féin | Francis Brolly | 917 |
| UUAP | Boyd Douglas | 748 |
| SDLP | Michael Coyle | 559 |
| Sinn Féin | Marion Donaghy | 559 |
| SDLP | Gerard Lynch | 497 |
| UUAP | Mark Gibson | 442 |
| DUP | John Murray | 259 |
| Turnout | | 5,149 |
| Sinn Féin gain from SDLP | | |
| Boyd Douglas leaves UUP | | |

Limavady Town
| Party | Candidate | 1st Pref |
|---|---|---|
| DUP | George Robinson | 1,430 |
| Independent | Brian Brown | 642 |
| SDLP | Desmond Lowry | 542 |
| SDLP | John Kerr | 530 |
| Sinn Féin | Malachy O'Kane | 419 |
| UUP | Jack Dolan | 383 |
| UUP | John Rankin | 372 |
| UUP | Raymond Kennedy | 241 |
| UUAP | Alister Smyth | 161 |
| Turnout | | 4,779 |
| Independent gain from SDLP | | |

=== Lisburn ===
Election results, shaded by plurality of First Preference Votes

Downshire
| Party | Candidate | 1st Pref |
|---|---|---|
| DUP | Edwin Poots | 2,006 |
| UUP | James Baird | 1,507 |
| Alliance | Elizabeth Campbell | 1,201 |
| UUP | William Ward | 1,193 |
| UUP | Edmund Falloon | 1,007 |
| DUP | Allan Ewart | 632 |
| Independent | William Bleakes | 609 |
| NI Conservatives | Joanne Johnston | 217 |
| Sinn Féin | Cara McCann | 111 |
| Turnout | | 8,602 |
| UUP gain from NI Conservatives | | |

Dunmurry Cross
| Party | Candidate | 1st Pref |
|---|---|---|
| Sinn Féin | Paul Butler | 2,061 |
| SDLP | Patricia Lewsley | 2,029 |
| UUP | Billy Bell | 1,550 |
| Sinn Féin | Michael Ferguson | 1,549 |
| Sinn Féin | Sue Ramsey | 1,219 |
| Sinn Féin | Veronica Willis | 993 |
| DUP | Stephen Moore | 910 |
| SDLP | William McDonnell | 640 |
| Sinn Féin | Paul Flynn | 422 |
| Independent | Malachy McAnespie | 218 |
| Turnout | | 12,031 |
| SDLP gain from Independent | | |

Killultagh
| Party | Candidate | 1st Pref |
|---|---|---|
| UUP | Jim Dillon | 1,923 |
| DUP | Cecil Calvert | 1,382 |
| SDLP | Peter O'Hagan | 1,318 |
| DUP | James Tinsley | 1,263 |
| UUP | Kenneth Watson | 658 |
| UUP | Samuel Johnston | 537 |
| Sinn Féin | Ita Gray | 457 |
| Alliance | Alison Gawith | 439 |
| NI Conservatives | Neil Johnston | 419 |
| Independent | Gordon Ross | 332 |
| Alliance | Owen Gawith | 131 |
| Turnout | | 9,019 |
| DUP gain from UUP | | |

Lisburn Town North
| Party | Candidate | 1st Pref |
|---|---|---|
| Alliance | Trevor Lunn | 1,903 |
| UUP | David Archer | 1,619 |
| UUP | William Watson | 1,190 |
| UUP | William Lewis | 1,183 |
| DUP | Jonathan Craig | 1,036 |
| DUP | Albert Leathem | 808 |
| UUP | Lorraine Martin | 749 |
| Independent | Ronnie Crawford | 711 |
| Independent | David Adams | 577 |
| Sinn Féin | James Armstrong | 451 |
| Independent | William Beattie | 423 |
| Independent | Adrian Creighton | 123 |
| Turnout | | 10,940 |
| UUP gain from UDP | | |
| DUP gain from Protestant Unionist | | |
| Ronnie Crawford changes designation from Independent Unionist | | |

Lisburn Town South
| Party | Candidate | 1st Pref |
|---|---|---|
| UUP | Ivan Davis | 1,521 |
| Alliance | Seamus Close | 1,495 |
| DUP | Paul Porter | 1,061 |
| UUP | David Archer | 721 |
| UUP | Joseph Lockhart | 592 |
| Independent | Gary McMichael | 509 |
| DUP | Allen Russell | 346 |
| UUP | Margaret Little | 253 |
| UUP | Samuel Mateer | 246 |
| Sinn Féin | Francis Kerr | 245 |
| NI Unionist | Gary Teeney | 64 |
| Turnout | | 7,252 |
| DUP gain from UUP | | |
| Gary McMichael leaves UDP | | |

=== Magherafelt ===
Election results, shaded by plurality of First Preference Votes

Magherafelt Town
| Party | Candidate | 1st Pref |
|---|---|---|
| DUP | William McCrea | 2,255 |
| Sinn Féin | John Kelly | 1,700 |
| UUP | George Shiels | 1,103 |
| Sinn Féin | Seamus O'Brien | 1,085 |
| SDLP | Joseph McBride | 990 |
| SDLP | Frances Symington | 696 |
| DUP | Paul McLean | 197 |
| Turnout | | 8,153 |
| Sinn Féin gain from SDLP | | |

Moyola
| Party | Candidate | 1st Pref |
|---|---|---|
| Sinn Féin | Oliver Hughes | 1,578 |
| Sinn Féin | James O'Neill | 1,375 |
| UUP | John Junkin | 1,237 |
| DUP | Thomas Catherwood | 1,023 |
| SDLP | Patrick McErlean | 713 |
| DUP | Elizabeth Forde | 430 |
| SDLP | Elizabeth Foster | 383 |
| Independent | Naaman Hutchinson | 210 |
| Turnout | | 7,104 |
No change

Sperrin
| Party | Candidate | 1st Pref |
|---|---|---|
| Sinn Féin | Patrick Groogan | 1,651 |
| Sinn Féin | Hugh Mullan | 1,331 |
| Sinn Féin | John Kerr | 1,206 |
| SDLP | Kathleen Lagan | 1,136 |
| Independent | Bertie Montgomery | 776 |
| DUP | Rodney Mitchell | 723 |
| SDLP | Francis McKendry | 551 |
| Workers' Party | Francis Donnelly | 104 |
| Turnout | | 7,625 |
| Sinn Féin gain from SDLP | | |
| Bertie Montgomery leaves UUP | | |

=== Moyle ===
Election results, shaded by plurality of First Preference Votes

Ballycastle
| Party | Candidate | 1st Pref |
|---|---|---|
| SDLP | Madeline Black | 429 |
| UUP | Helen Harding | 379 |
| SDLP | Michael Molloy | 357 |
| DUP | Gardiner Kane | 345 |
| Independent | Seamus Blaney | 551 |
| Sinn Féin | Charlie Neill | 296 |
| Independent | Liam McBride | 202 |
| Independent | Seamus Blaney | 197 |
| Independent | Christopher McCaughan | 189 |
| Independent | Anna Edwards | 40 |
| Turnout | | 2,522 |
| SDLP gain from Independent | | |

Giant's Causeway
| Party | Candidate | 1st Pref |
|---|---|---|
| DUP | David McAllister | 495 |
| UUP | William Graham | 398 |
| Independent | Price McConaghy | 367 |
| DUP | George Hartin | 258 |
| DUP | Robert Chestnutt | 228 |
| UUP | Robert McIlroy | 223 |
| SDLP | Moira McGouran | 76 |
| Independent | Thomas Palmer | 23 |
| Turnout | | 2,114 |
| Price McConaghy changes designation from Independent Unionist | | |

The Glens
| Party | Candidate | 1st Pref |
|---|---|---|
| Independent | Oliver McMullan | 671 |
| SDLP | Catherine McCambridge | 348 |
| Independent | Randal McDonnell | 316 |
| SDLP | Christine Blaney | 281 |
| Independent | James McCarry | 454 |
| Sinn Féin | Monica Digney | 216 |
| DUP | Evelyne Robinson | 194 |
| SDLP | Archie McIntosh | 190 |
| Sinn Féin | Anne McAuley | 178 |
| Independent | James McAuley | 77 |
| Turnout | | 2,488 |
No change

=== Newry and Mourne ===
Election results, shaded by plurality of First Preference Votes

Crotlieve
| Party | Candidate | 1st Pref |
|---|---|---|
| SDLP | P. J. Bradley | 2,103 |
| Sinn Féin | Mick Murphy | 1,743 |
| SDLP | Hugh Carr | 1,189 |
| SDLP | Josephine O'Hare | 1,175 |
| Independent | Ciaran Mussen | 834 |
| Sinn Féin | Michael Ruane | 807 |
| Independent | Anthony Williamson | 751 |
| SDLP | Michael Carr | 714 |
| UUP | John McConnell | 697 |
| SDLP | Brendan Murney | 576 |
| Sinn Féin | Eamonn O'Connor | 428 |
| DUP | Ruth McConnell | 274 |
| Turnout | | 11,615 |
| Sinn Féin gain from Independent | | |

Newry Town
| Party | Candidate | 1st Pref |
|---|---|---|
| Sinn Féin | Davy Hyland | 1,213 |
| Independent | Jackie Patterson | 1,150 |
| Sinn Féin | Charlie Casey | 1,119 |
| Sinn Féin | Brendan Curran | 1,025 |
| Sinn Féin | Conor Murphy | 984 |
| SDLP | Patrick McElroy | 950 |
| SDLP | Frank Feely | 940 |
| SDLP | John McArdle | 811 |
| UUP | William McCaigue | 727 |
| SDLP | Peter McEvoy | 503 |
| Independent | Declan O'Callaghan | 109 |
| Turnout | | 9,796 |
| Sinn Féin gain from Independent | | |
| SDLP gain from UUP | | |

Slieve Gullion
| Party | Candidate | 1st Pref |
|---|---|---|
| Sinn Féin | Elena Martin | 1,436 |
| Sinn Féin | Colman Burns | 1,431 |
| Sinn Féin | Patrick McDonald | 1,415 |
| Sinn Féin | Terry Hearty | 1,283 |
| SDLP | John Fee | 1,195 |
| SDLP | Pat Toner | 840 |
| SDLP | Mary McKeown | 568 |
| Turnout | | 8,441 |
| Sinn Féin gain from SDLP | | |

The Fews
| Party | Candidate | 1st Pref |
|---|---|---|
| Sinn Féin | Jimmy McCreesh | 1,279 |
| Sinn Féin | Pat McGinn | 1,243 |
| UUP | Danny Kennedy | 1,231 |
| Sinn Féin | Brendan Lewis | 1,172 |
| SDLP | John Feehan | 1,071 |
| SDLP | Charles Smyth | 879 |
| UUP | Andy Moffett | 727 |
| DUP | Craig Baxter | 693 |
| SDLP | Angela Savage | 595 |
| Turnout | | 9,121 |
| Sinn Féin gain from SDLP | | |

The Mournes
| Party | Candidate | 1st Pref |
|---|---|---|
| DUP | William Burns | 1,845 |
| Sinn Féin | Martin Cunningham | 1,291 |
| SDLP | Micky Cole | 1,205 |
| UUP | Henry Reilly | 1,185 |
| UUP | Isaac Hanna | 1,178 |
| SDLP | Marian Fitzpatrick | 872 |
| DUP | Linda Burns | 110 |
| Turnout | | 7,856 |
| Sinn Féin gain from SDLP | | |

=== Newtownabbey ===
Election results, shaded by plurality of First Preference Votes

Antrim Line
| Party | Candidate | 1st Pref |
|---|---|---|
| UUP | Edward Crilly | 1,704 |
| DUP | Nigel Hamilton | 1,350 |
| SDLP | Tommy McTeague | 1,128 |
| SDLP | Noreen McClelland | 887 |
| Sinn Féin | Briege Meehan | 754 |
| Sinn Féin | Roisin McGurk | 643 |
| DUP | Arthur Templeton | 640 |
| UUP | Ivan Hunter | 607 |
| Alliance | Pam Tilson | 547 |
| UUP | Arthur Kell | 536 |
| NI Unionist | Norman Boyd | 418 |
| Newtownabbey Ratepayers' Association | John Blair | 389 |
| DUP | Liz Snoddy | 337 |
| NI Women's Coalition | Joan Cosgrove | 299 |
| Independent | James Beckett | 228 |
| Turnout | | 10,728 |
| DUP gain from UUP | | |
| SDLP gain from Alliance | | |
| Sinn Féin gain from NRA | | |

Ballyclare
| Party | Candidate | 1st Pref |
|---|---|---|
| DUP | Paul Girvan | 2,583 |
| UUP | Vera McWilliams | 1,231 |
| UUP | Jim Bingham | 1,192 |
| Alliance | Pat McCudden | 761 |
| UUP | Ed Turkington | 541 |
| DUP | Pamela Hunter | 308 |
| UUP | Peter Walker | 267 |
| PUP | Norman Lavery | 249 |
| Independent | Sharon Parkes | 247 |
| NI Conservatives | Alan Greer | 169 |
| Turnout | | 7,734 |
| DUP gain from Alliance | | |

Macedon
| Party | Candidate | 1st Pref |
|---|---|---|
| DUP | William DeCourcy | 1,355 |
| Independent | Mark Langhammer | 1,103 |
| UUP | Dineen Walker | 784 |
| Newtownabbey Ratepayers' Association | Billy Webb | 650 |
| Independent | Tommy Kirkham | 611 |
| DUP | Kenneth Hunter | 563 |
| PUP | Dougie Jamison | 398 |
| Independent | Robert Kidd | 378 |
| Sinn Féin | Kevin Vernon | 350 |
| Independent | Andrew Beattie | 276 |
| Alliance | Michael Campbell | 173 |
| Independent | Victor Robinson | 225 |
| Turnout | | 7,279 |
| Mark Langhammer leaves Newtownabbey Labour Party | | |
| Tommy Kirkham leaves UDP | | |
| DUP gain from Independent | | |

University
| Party | Candidate | 1st Pref |
|---|---|---|
| DUP | Roger Hutchinson | 1,791 |
| UUP | Ken Robinson | 1,535 |
| UUP | Barbara Gilliland | 1,351 |
| Alliance | Lynn Frazer | 1,313 |
| UUAP | Fraser Agnew | 828 |
| PUP | William Greer | 811 |
| NI Unionist | Billy Boyd | 504 |
| DUP | John Mann | 479 |
| UUAP | John Scott | 469 |
| UUP | Vi Scott | 468 |
| Independent | Alister Bell | 447 |
| Turnout | | 10,232 |
| Fraser Agnew joins UUAP | | |
| DUP gain from PUP | | |

=== North Down ===
Election results, shaded by plurality of First Preference Votes

Abbey
| Party | Candidate | 1st Pref |
|---|---|---|
| DUP | Ruby Cooling | 1,263 |
| UUP | Irene Cree | 1,246 |
| Alliance | Stephen Farry | 1,195 |
| UK Unionist | Valerie Kinghan | 912 |
| UUP | Roberta Dunlop | 843 |
| PUP | Stewart Currie | 417 |
| DUP | William Montgomery | 299 |
| Independent | Karl McLean | 297 |
| NI Conservatives | Lisa Fleming | 191 |
| Independent | Christopher Carter | 175 |
| Independent | Raymond Gordon | 89 |
| NI Unionist | Colin Dean | 48 |
| Turnout | | 7,225 |
| UUP gain from NI Conservatives | | |
| DUP gain from PUP | | |

Ballyholme and Groomsport
| Party | Candidate | 1st Pref |
|---|---|---|
| Independent | Alan Chambers | 2,099 |
| UUP | Leslie Cree | 1,631 |
| Independent | Austen Lennon | 1,363 |
| DUP | Alex Easton | 1,164 |
| Alliance | Marsden Fitzsimons | 939 |
| NI Women's Coalition | Patricia Wallace | 657 |
| UUP | Ian Henry | 601 |
| UK Unionist | Henry Gordon | 571 |
| Alliance | Gavin Walker | 336 |
| UK Unionist | Joseph Teggart | 276 |
| Independent | Ernest Steele | 218 |
| UUP | Arthur Gadd | 202 |
| NI Unionist | Elizabeth Roche | 140 |
| PUP | Brian Lacey | 90 |
| Turnout | | 10,481 |
| DUP gain from UKUP | | |
| Women's Coalition gain from NI Conservatives | | |

Bangor West
| Party | Candidate | 1st Pref |
|---|---|---|
| Independent | Brian Wilson | 1,871 |
| UUP | Marion Smith | 1,311 |
| Alliance | Anne Wilson | 1,112 |
| DUP | Alan Graham | 989 |
| UUP | Royston Davies | 796 |
| UK Unionist | William Keery | 676 |
| Alliance | Tony Hill | 630 |
| UK Unionist | Alan Field | 599 |
| PUP | James Rea | 538 |
| UUP | Evan Ward | 416 |
| NI Conservatives | Julian Robertson | 172 |
| Turnout | | 9,324 |
| DUP gain from PUP | | |

Holywood
| Party | Candidate | 1st Pref |
|---|---|---|
| UUP | Ellie McKay | 1,346 |
| Alliance | Susan O'Brien | 1,070 |
| DUP | Gordon Dunne | 916 |
| Independent | Dennis Ogborn | 815 |
| NI Women's Coalition | Norma Heaton | 509 |
| UUP | Diana Peacocke | 491 |
| Alliance | Larry Thompson | 436 |
| Independent | Bobby Irvine | 232 |
| NI Conservatives | Lindsay Cumming | 188 |
| PUP | David Rose | 122 |
| Turnout | | 6,249 |
| UUP gain from Alliance | | |

=== Omagh ===
Election results, shaded by plurality of First Preference Votes

Mid Tyrone
| Party | Candidate | 1st Pref |
|---|---|---|
| Sinn Féin | John Clarke | 1,446 |
| Sinn Féin | Damien Curran | 1,244 |
| UUP | Robert Wilson | 1,191 |
| Sinn Féin | Michael McAnespie | 995 |
| SDLP | Gerry O'Doherty | 994 |
| SDLP | Seamus Shields | 989 |
| DUP | Samuel McFarland | 984 |
| Sinn Féin | Barney McAleer | 917 |
| Sinn Féin | Cathal McCrory | 791 |
| Turnout | | 9,749 |
| Sinn Féin gain from DUP | | |

Omagh Town
| Party | Candidate | 1st Pref |
|---|---|---|
| Sinn Féin | Sean Begley | 1,123 |
| DUP | Oliver Gibson | 1,087 |
| Independent | Paddy McGowan | 1,074 |
| SDLP | Joe Byrne | 1,007 |
| Sinn Féin | Paddy Gallagher | 763 |
| Independent | Johnny McLaughlin | 759 |
| SDLP | Josephine Deehan | 629 |
| UUP | Reuben McKelvey | 614 |
| UUP | John Anderson | 552 |
| SDLP | Vincent Campbell | 178 |
| DUP | Thomas McCordick | 171 |
| SDLP | Kevin Taylor | 19 |
| Turnout | | 8,198 |
| Paddy McGowan leaves SDLP | | |
| SDLP gain from Alliance | | |

West Tyrone
| Party | Candidate | 1st Pref |
|---|---|---|
| SDLP | Pat McDonnell | 1,372 |
| Sinn Féin | Barry McElduff | 1,276 |
| UUP | Allan Rainey | 1,135 |
| DUP | Thomas Buchanan | 1,093 |
| Sinn Féin | Peter Kelly | 839 |
| Sinn Féin | Patrick Watters | 763 |
| SDLP | Liam McQuaid | 679 |
| UUP | David Sterritt | 666 |
| Sinn Féin | Damien McCrossan | 614 |
| DUP | Stephen Harpur | 257 |
| Workers' Party | Tommy Owens | 211 |
| Independent | Gerry McMenamin | 202 |
| Turnout | | 9,286 |
| Sinn Féin gain from UUP | | |

=== Strabane ===
Election results, shaded by plurality of First Preference Votes

Derg
| Party | Candidate | 1st Pref |
|---|---|---|
| Sinn Féin | Charles McHugh | 1,331 |
| UUP | Derek Hussey | 1,110 |
| Sinn Féin | Eamonn McGarvey | 910 |
| DUP | Thomas Kerrigan | 793 |
| SDLP | Bernadette McNamee | 768 |
| DUP | Kathleen Allison | 838 |
| Sinn Féin | Gerard Foley | 651 |
| UUP | Edward Turner | 565 |
| Turnout | | 6,932 |
| Sinn Féin gain from UUP | | |

Glenelly
| Party | Candidate | 1st Pref |
|---|---|---|
| DUP | Allan Bresland | 1,313 |
| SDLP | Thomas McBride | 1,133 |
| Sinn Féin | Claire McGill | 939 |
| DUP | John Donnell | 879 |
| UUP | James Emery | 876 |
| Sinn Féin | Martin Conway | 603 |
| UUP | Robert Craig | 585 |
| Turnout | | 6,456 |
No change

Mourne
| Party | Candidate | 1st Pref |
|---|---|---|
| SDLP | Eugene McMenamin | 1,538 |
| Sinn Féin | Jarlath McNulty | 1,326 |
| Sinn Féin | Ivan Barr | 1,262 |
| Sinn Féin | Brian McMahon | 977 |
| Sinn Féin | Daniel Breslin | 628 |
| Independent | James O'Kane | 589 |
| Independent | Gags Gallagher | 445 |
| UUP | Sam Martin | 439 |
| SDLP | Ann Bell | 438 |
| DUP | Kathleen Craig | 408 |
| SDLP | Fred Henry | 284 |
| Turnout | | 8,531 |
| Sinn Féin gain from SDLP and Independent | | |
