= Lord Johnston =

Lord Johnston may refer to:

- Alan Johnston, Lord Johnston (1942–2008), Scottish judge
- Douglas Johnston, Lord Johnston (1907–1985), Scottish judge
- Charles Johnston, Baron Johnston of Rockport (1915–2002), British businessman and politician

== See also ==
- Russell Johnston, Baron Russell-Johnston (1932–2008), Scottish politician
- Lord Johnson (disambiguation)
