= Tom Hartley =

Tom Hartley may refer to:

- Tom Hartley (politician) (born 1945), Irish historian and politician
- Tom Hartley (cricketer) (born 1999), English cricketer

== See also ==
- Thomas Hartley (1748–1800), American lawyer, soldier, and politician
- Thomas Gordon Hartley (1931–2016), American botanist
