= Will Glendinning =

Northern Irish politician

Member of Belfast City Council
- In office 15 May 1985 – 1987
- Preceded by: District created
- Succeeded by: Fra McCann
- Constituency: Lower Falls
- In office 18 May 1977 – 15 May 1985
- Preceded by: Thomas Murphy
- Succeeded by: District abolished
- Constituency: Belfast Area F

Member of the Northern Ireland Assembly for West Belfast
- In office 20 October 1982 – 1986

Personal details
- Born: Portadown, Northern Ireland
- Party: Alliance Party
- Spouse: Pip
- Relations: Robert Glendinning (great-grandfather); Robin Glendinning (brother)

Will Glendinning is a former Northern Irish politician.

== Background ==
He was born in Portadown, the brother of Robin, and a great-grandchild of Robert Glendinning. Glendinning attended Rockport School in Holywood, County Down.

Glendinning joined the Ulster Defence Regiment in the early 1970s and served in Armagh. In 1977, he was elected as an Alliance Party of Northern Ireland (APNI) councillor for Belfast Area F, which covered the Lower Falls, Donegall Road and Markets areas. He held his seat in 1981, and was also narrowly elected at the 1982 Northern Ireland Assembly election for West Belfast.

"Area F" was abolished in 1985 but Glendinning won a council seat in the Lower Falls Electoral Area, with his wife Pip succeeding in gaining a seat for APNI in the adjacent Upper Falls Area. He and his wife both resigned their council seats in 1987 due to the birth of their daughter.

He became the Chief Executive of the Community Relations Council, before becoming a consultant on "cultural diversity, community relations and transition from conflict" establishing the peace-building charity Diversity Challenges. He has served as Coordinator since 2002. Diversity Challenges worked with culturally specific groups including the Loyal Orders Bands, the GAA, and others to promote change to recognise the increasing cultural diversity. He was chairperson of the Northern Ireland Asscoation of Citizens Advice Bureaux (CAB) in the 1990s. He also served on the board of Community Technical Aid. He served on the board and was chairperson of Newry and Mourne CAB until its merger with Down CAB. Through Diversity Challenges, he is on the European Board of the International Coalition of the Sites of Conscience (https://www.sitesofconscience.org/en/home/)

Northern Ireland Assembly (1982)
New assembly	MPA for Belfast West; 1982–1986	Assembly abolished
