= Michael Lynas =

British chief executive (born 1981)

Michael Lynas (born 3 October 1981) was the Chief Executive of the National Citizen Service (NCS). He was replaced in the role by Mark Gifford on 2 March 2020.

== Early life ==
Lynas attended Rockport School in Holywood, Northern Ireland and Eton College, from 2000 to 2003. After graduating from Eton he studied Social and Political Sciences at Trinity College, Cambridge, and he was also the President of the Cambridge Union.

In 2003, he was awarded a Frank Knox Memorial Fellowship to study at the Kennedy School of Government, at Harvard University. He received a Master's in Public Policy in 2005.

== Career ==
=== Bain & Company ===
Michael worked as a consultant at global strategy consulting firm Bain & Company.

=== No. 10 Downing Street ===
In June 2010 he became a senior policy adviser to the Prime Minister and Deputy Prime Minister, in the Number 10 Policy Unit. He worked on a range of policy areas including London 2012, equal marriage and National Citizen Service.

=== National Citizen Service ===
The National Citizen Service was piloted by The Challenge in 2009. Lynas joined NCS Trust, the government body overseeing the programme, in 2013 where he served as the Chief Executive. The NCS Trust is headquartered in west London, south of the A40 (Westway, London), near the junction (Westway Roundabout) with the West Cross Route (A3220).

In September 2019 he announced his resignation, with NCS Trust facing criticism on being overly expensive and failing to hit participation targets.

== Other interests ==
He serves as a Trustee for two charities: Generation Change, an independent partnership of charities that together help over 600,000 young people each year to take part in social action, and the John Browne Memorial Trust. He is also listed as a Big Changer, by Big Change, a social impact accelerator to support young people.

He has also written about youth issues, including as a columnist for the i newspaper.

Civic offices
Preceded by New organisation	Chief Executive of the National Citizen Service (NCS); January 2014 -	Succeeded by Incumbent
