= Fred Covington =

English cricketer

Frederick Ernest Covington (29 October 1912 – 3 July 1995) was an English first-class cricketer active 1935–36 who played for Middlesex and Cambridge University. He was born in Kingston-upon-Thames, Surrey, and educated at Rockport School, near Holywood, County Down, then at Harrow (where he was captain of cricket 1931–32) and Magdalene College, Cambridge. After representing Cambridge University in 1935, he played in six first-class matches for Middlesex in 1936 scoring 142 runs at 20.28, including 83 on his debut against Warwickshire at Lord's, the highest score of the match. During World War II he joined the Royal Navy as a seaman, then was commissioned and commanded tank landing craft in British waters and in the Mediterranean. After the war he joined his cousin's firm of stockbrokers. He died in Poole, Dorset.
