= Willoughby Weaving =

Harry Willoughby Weaving
- Born: 6 June 1885; Wolvercote
- Died: 16 February 1976 (aged 89); Abingdon-on-Thames

Harry Willoughby Weaving (1885–1976) was a British writer and poet of the First World War era.

== Early life and education ==
Willoughby Weaving was the son of Harry Walker Weaving, brewer and farmer, of Pewet House, Wootton, Abingdon. He entered Abingdon School in September 1898 and stayed until 1905. He was one of five brothers to attend the School and received the Meredith prize for Greek and Latin during 1905. After Abingdon School he was a Abingdon Scholar at Pembroke College, Oxford.

== Career ==
In 1911 at the age of 26 he was assisting his father on the Pewet House 54 acre Wootton country residence and farm. He later became a schoolmaster at Rockport School in Holywood, County Down and headmaster and proprietor of Elm Park School, County Armagh. He left Ireland in 1954 to return to Abingdon-on-Thames to live. His work is included in Robert Bridges' 1915 anthology The Spirit of Man. Serving in the Great War with the Royal Irish Rifles,

== Works ==
Weaving wrote various war poems, including:

- Poems (1913)
- The Dead (1915)
- Ghosts (1915)
- Progress (1917)
- Dies Irae - Day of Wrath (1917)
- Between the Trenches (1917)
- Birds in the Trenches (1917)
- Warrior Months (1917)

Weaving's other publications include The Star Fields and other poems (1916), The Bubble and other poems (1917), Heard Melodies (1918), Algazel (1920), Daedal Wings (1920), Ivory Palaces (1931), Spoils of Time (1933), Toys of Eternity (1937), Purple Testament of Bleeding War (1941) and Sonnets: and a few lyrics (1952).

== Death ==
He died on 16 February 1976 in Abingdon.

== See also ==
- List of Old Abingdonians
