= Rockport School =

Independent day and boarding school near Holywood, Northern Ireland

Coordinates: 54.665°N 5.773°W

- Holywood, County Down, Northern Ireland

Information
- Type: Private school; day and boarding
- Motto: Virtus Repulsae Nescia Sordidae
- Established: 1906
- Headmaster: George Vance
- Colours: Green and White
- Age Range: 3 to 18
- Website: rockportschool.com

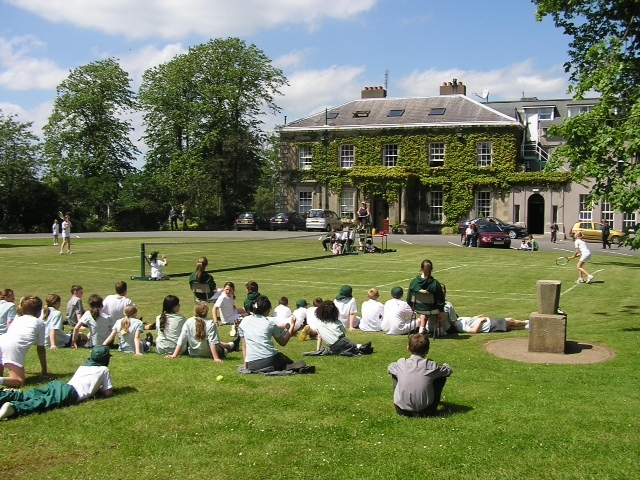
Greens v Whites: Inter-House Tennis at Rockport School

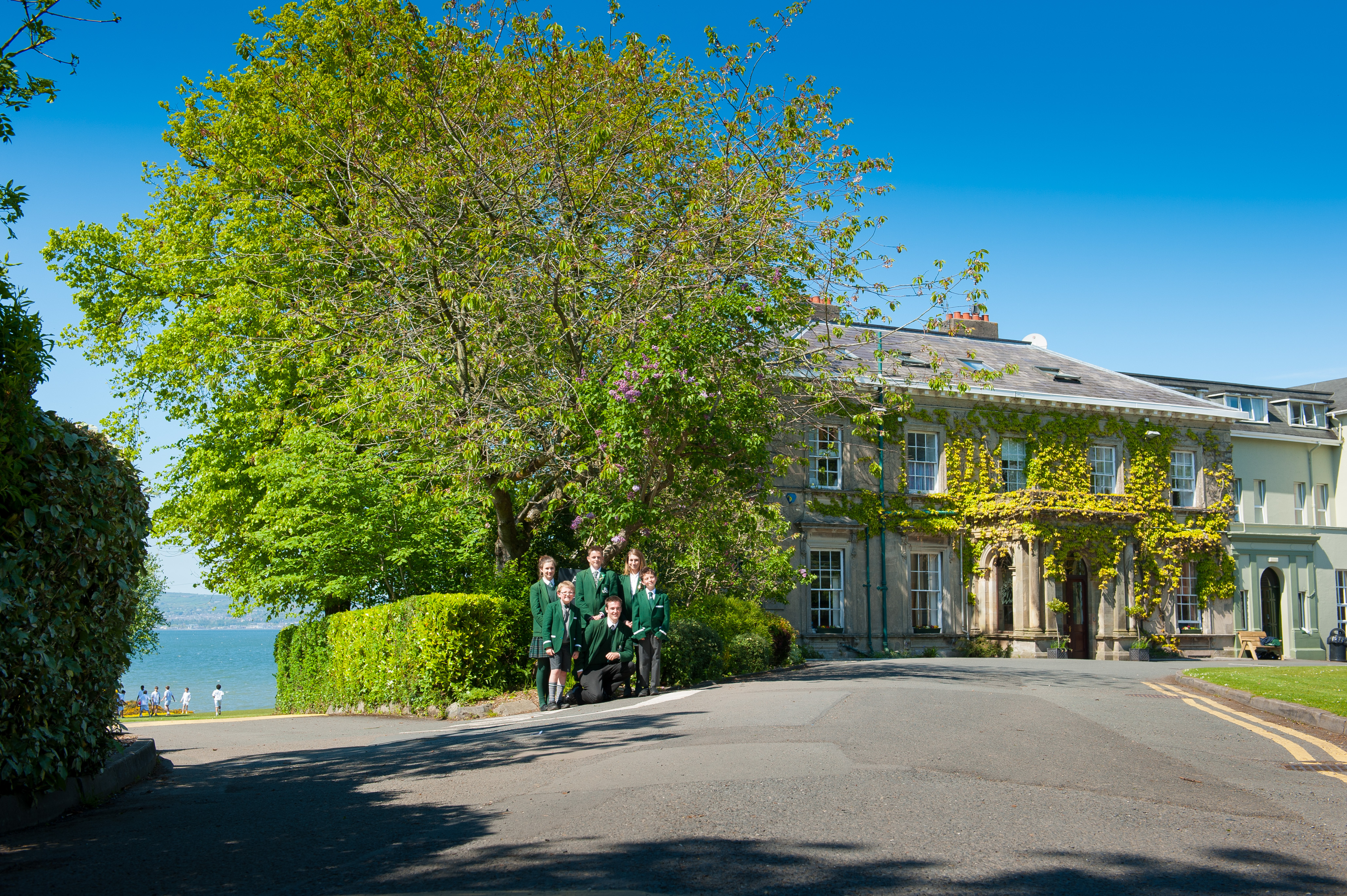
Rockport School: A Round Square School

Rockport School is a private day and boarding school for boys and girls from 2.5 years to 18 years in the British Public School tradition. It is situated in 25 acres (10 ha) of woodland on the shore of Belfast Lough in Craigavad, near Holywood, County Down, Northern Ireland, between Belfast and Bangor.

== History ==
The school was founded in 1906 by Geoffrey Bing of Rossall School and Keble College, Oxford, with the original aim to "prepare boys for the Public Schools and the Royal Naval College, Dartmouth". Bing was 29 and had taught previously in St George's, Broadstairs and at St Andrew's School, Southborough, Tunbridge Wells. Rockport began with only four boys, an assistant master and a matron but quickly grew in size. The school now has around 300 pupils and accepts both boys and girls from the age of 3 until 18 (A Level) as day or boarding pupils.

== Notable alumni ==
=== Arts and media ===
- Dudi Appleton, journalist and film director
- Lady Caroline Blackwood, journalist and novelist
- Turlough Convery, actor
- Shaun Davey, composer
- Daniel Edelstyn, filmmaker, screenwriter and actor
- Howard Ferguson (composer)
- Gary Lightbody, musician Snow Patrol
- William MacQuitty, film producer
- Flora Montgomery, actress
- Jonny Quinn, musician (Snow Patrol)
- James Quinn (film administrator), one of the longest-serving Directors of the British Film Institute
- Jessica Reynolds, actress
- Willoughby Weaving, poet of the Great War

=== Politics ===
- Geoffrey Bing, Labour MP for Hornchurch and first Attorney General of Ghana
- Gordon Campbell, Baron Campbell of Croy, Conservative politician and Secretary of State for Scotland from 1970 to 1974
- Nigel Casey, Diplomat, former British High Commissioner to South Africa
- Natalie Evans, Baroness Evans of Bowes Park, former Leader of the House of Lords
- Robin Glendinning, playwright and former politician instrumental in founding the Alliance Party of Northern Ireland
- Will Glendinning, Alliance politician
- Sir John Gorman, soldier, Unionist politician
- Charles Johnston, Baron Johnston of Rockport, Conservative politician, businessman
- Michael Lynas, former Adviser at No 10 Policy unit and Chief Executive of the National Citizen Service (NCS)
- Alan McFarland, Unionist politician
- Rafton Pounder, Unionist politician
- John Robb, surgeon; Irish Senator and founder of the New Ireland Group
- John Turnley, Irish nationalist activist

=== Business ===
- John Crosslé, founder of the Crosslé Car Company
- Sir Peter Gadsden, 652nd Lord Mayor of London

=== Military ===
- Sir Michael McCorkell, soldier, public servant and Lord Lieutenant of County Londonderry for 25 years
- Sir John Morrison Forbes, Vice-Admiral. Royal Navy officer who became Naval Secretary.

=== Sports ===
- Ronnie Adams, car racer
- Fred Covington, cricketer
- Karabo Meso, cricketer
- Stuart Pollock, cricketer
- Ben Reynolds, athlete
- Paddy Wallace, Irish international rugby player
- John Watson, Formula 1 racing driver and commentator
