= Robin Glendinning =

Northern Irish playwright and politician (1938–2025)

- Born: Robert James Glendinning; 1 September 1938; Belfast, Northern Ireland
- Died: 8 September 2025 (aged 87); Comber, Northern Ireland
- Education: Campbell College; Trinity College Dublin
- Occupation: Playwright
- Relatives: Will Glendinning (brother)

Robert James Glendinning (1 September 1938 – 8 September 2025) was a Northern Irish playwright and politician.

== Life and career ==
Born in Belfast on 1 September 1938, the brother of Will Glendinning, Robin grew up in County Armagh and studied at Rockport School, Campbell College and Trinity College Dublin. He taught English and history at Omagh Academy for eleven years.

Glendinning was a founder of the Alliance Party of Northern Ireland, and left teaching in 1973 to become its full-time political organiser. He stood for the party in Mid Ulster at the 1973 Northern Ireland Assembly election and Armagh at the February 1974 general election, but failed to win a seat on both occasions.

In 1976, Glendinning returned to teaching, working at the Royal Belfast Academical Institution, although he remained politically active, campaigning for the Alliance Party into the 1980s, and presenting a submission to the New Ireland Forum in 1983. He also began writing short stories, some of which were published in the Irish Times, as a result of which he won the Hennessey Award. Following this, he switched to write plays, several of which were produced for BBC Television and Radio. These early works included The Artist, Condemning Violence, Culture Vultures, Faith, Mumbo Jumbo and Stuffing It. In 1991, his Donny Boy won "Best New Play" at the inaugural TMA Awards, and this success inspired him to again quit teaching, this time to become a full-time writer.

Glendinning died in Comber, Northern Ireland on 8 September 2025, at the age of 87.
