= Lord Johnson =

Lord Johnson may refer to:

- Jo Johnson, Baron Johnson of Marylebone (born 1971), British politician
- Dominic Johnson, Baron Johnson of Lainston (born 1974), British financier, hedge fund manager and politician

== See also ==
- Lord Johnston (disambiguation)
