= Fra McCann =

Northern Irish politician (born 1953)

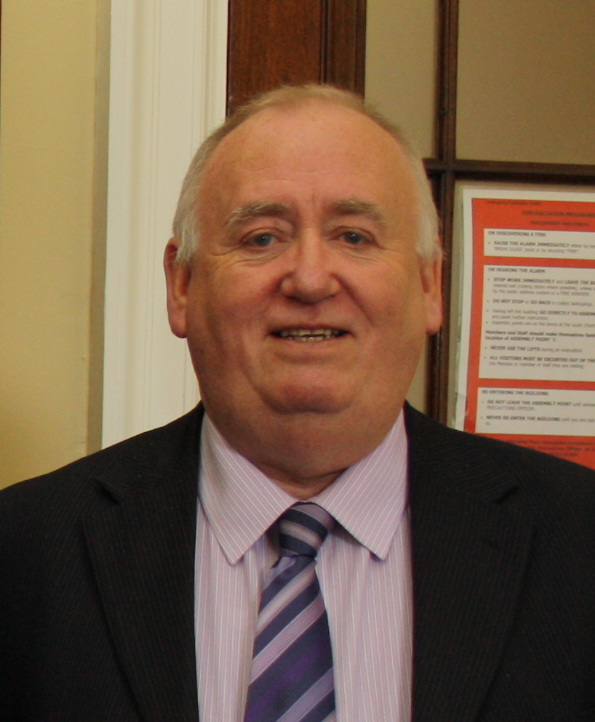

Member of the Northern Ireland Assembly for West Belfast
- In office 26 November 2003 – November 2021
- Preceded by: Alex Maskey
- Succeeded by: Aisling Reilly

Member of Belfast City Council
- In office 1987 – 5 May 2011
- Preceded by: Will Glendinning
- Succeeded by: Colin Keenan
- Constituency: Lower Falls

Personal details
- Born: 19 June 1953 (age 72) Belfast, Northern Ireland
- Party: Sinn Féin
- Website: Fra McCann MLA

Fra McCann (born 19 June 1953) is a retired Irish Sinn Féin politician and former Republican prisoner.

McCann became active in the Irish republican movement and was imprisoned in the 1970s for membership of the Provisional Irish Republican Army, and took part in the blanket protest while in prison.

As a politician, he was a Belfast City Councillor for the Lower Falls DEA from 1987 to 2011.

He latterly served as a Member of the Northern Ireland Assembly (MLA) for Belfast West from 2003 to 2021.

== Biography ==
McCann was imprisoned during the 1970s for firearms offences. While being held in H-Block 3 of the Maze, McCann befriended Kieran Nugent and participated in the blanket protest.

In 1987, he was elected to Belfast City Council, having won a by-election, representing the Lower Falls District.

He was re-elected to the council in 1989, 1993, 1997 and 2001.

McCann was later elected to the Northern Ireland Assembly, representing West Belfast, at the 2003 election.

In June 2006, McCann was charged with assault and disorderly behaviour following an incident in west Belfast. The incident occurred as the PSNI attempted to arrest a teenager for attempted robbery. However, McCann claimed heavy-handedness by the police and stated "I tried to put myself between one of the officers and the girl when the police officer radioed for assistance." McCann was released on bail.

He retained his Assembly seat in 2007, 2011 and 2017.

In October 2021, Fra McCann announced that he would be stepping down as MLA for West Belfast and would not be contesting the next election.

Northern Ireland Assembly
Preceded by Alex Maskey	MLA for Belfast West; 2004–2021	Incumbent
