= Gerry MacLochlainn =

Irish republican, political activist, councillor

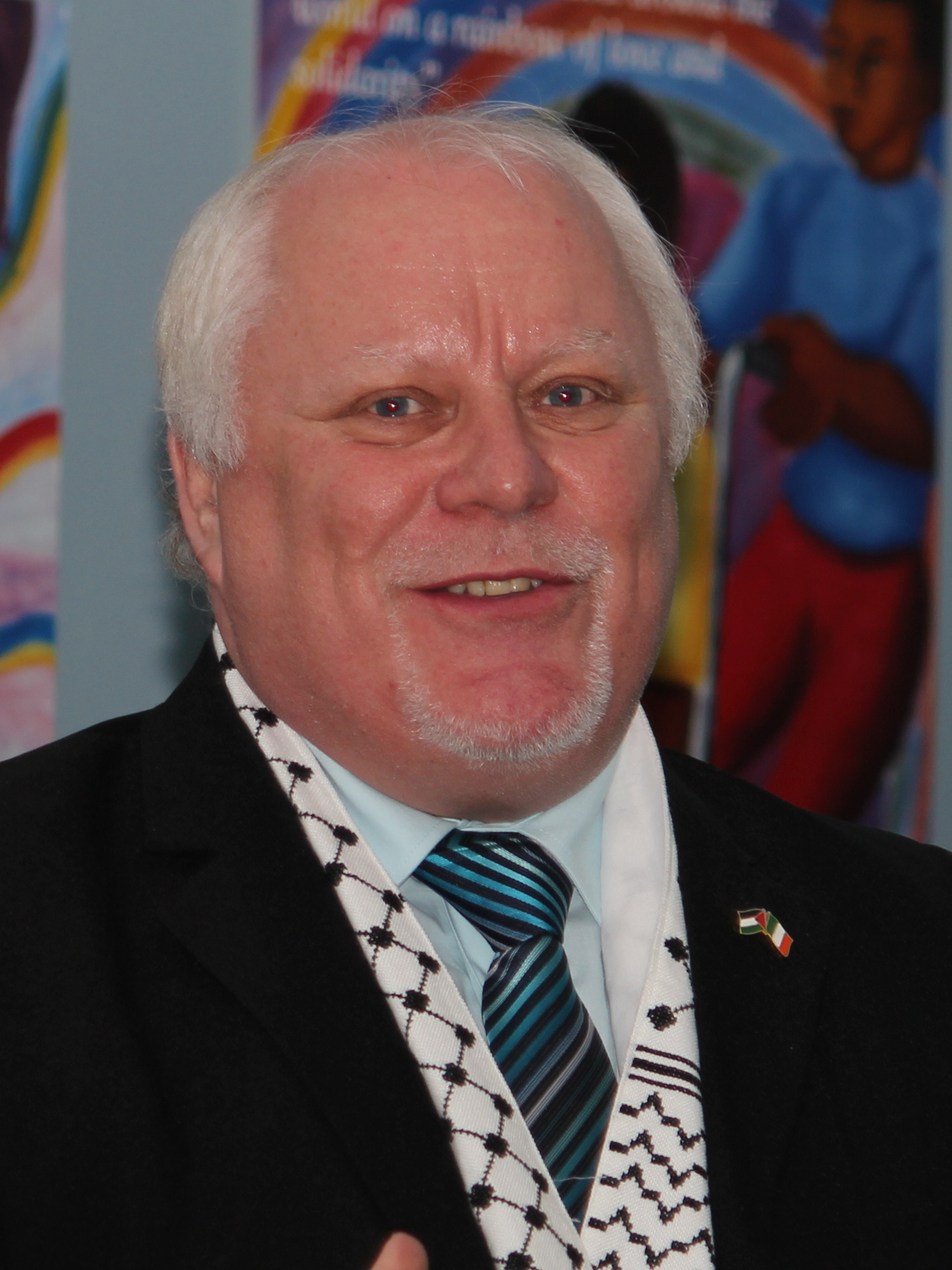
MacLochlainn in 2012

Gerard MacLochlainn (born 1954) is a Sinn Féin politician from Derry, Northern Ireland, where he was a councillor. He chaired several of the council's major committees including regional and cross border committees. His writings were widely circulated in his now deceased wife (Valerie June "Val" Cardwell)'s native Wales and several of his prison letters are held in the National Library of Wales.

== Life ==
Born in Derry in 1954, MacLochlainn attended Brow of the Hill Christian Brothers School and St Columb's College, both in that city. In 1980, MacLochlainn was arrested and charged with conspiracy to cause explosions and possession of explosives. He was sentenced to six years in prison.

MacLochlainn was at the centre of a controversy in October 1984 when he was a guest to the House of Commons of Labour MP Jeremy Corbyn, along with another former IRA prisoner, Linda Quigley, to discuss prison conditions. A decade later, as Sinn Féin's then representative in London, he was in the first delegation to meet with the British Labour Party front bench in December 1994.

MacLochlainn was part of the campaign to free the Guildford Four and Birmingham Six. He represented Sinn Féin at the Inaugural Meeting of the Kurdish Parliament in Exile in the Hague and addressed that conference alongside parliamentarians from around the world.

In 2011, he condemned a bomb attack in Derry carried out by dissident republicans.

== Elected representative ==
A leading Sinn Féin Councillor in Derry, he is the party spokesperson on environmental matters and has been chair of the Environmental Services Committee, ERNACT (European Region Network for the Application of Communications Technology), and represents the City on the North West Regional Waste Management Committee.

A strong supporter of the Palestinian cause, MacLochlainn was one of the leaders of the campaign against the Israeli embargo of Gaza. He proposed and gained acceptance of a city policy of a boycott of Israeli goods until an end to the embargo. On 26 May 2009, he crossed Rafah into the Gaza Strip with the Hope For Gaza convoy of medical aid. As deputy leader of the European Hope Convoy, MacLochlainn helped to deliver some 25 ambulances, a kidney dialysis machine, medicine and several wheel chairs. He met with Ismail Haniyeh, Palestinian prime minister and leader of Hamas in Gaza.
