= Lower Falls (District Electoral Area) =

Electoral division in Belfast, Northern Ireland

Lower Falls District Electoral Area
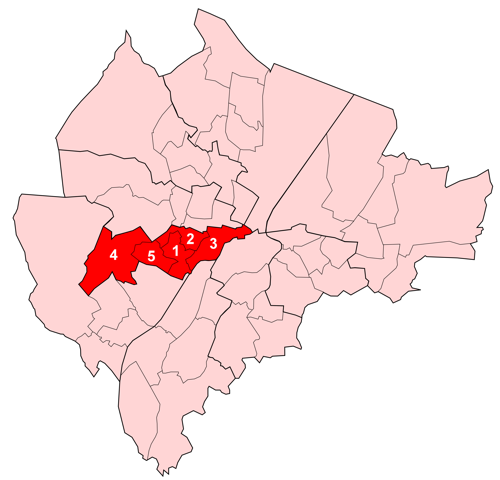
- Map showing Lower Falls wards within Belfast
- Population: (2008 Estimate)
- District: Belfast City Council
- County: County Antrim
- Country: Northern Ireland
- Sovereign state: United Kingdom
- UK Parliament: Belfast West
- NI Assembly: Belfast West

Lower Falls was one of the nine district electoral areas which existed in Belfast, Northern Ireland from 1985 to 2014. Located in the west of the city, the district elected five members to Belfast City Council and contained the wards of Beechmount; Clonard; Falls; Upper Springfield; and Whiterock. Lower Falls formed part of the Belfast West constituencies for the Northern Ireland Assembly and UK Parliament. The district, along with the neighbouring Upper Falls district took its name from the Falls Road, one of the main arterial routes in the west of the city.

== History ==
Lower Falls was created for the 1985 local elections. The Falls and Clonard wards had previously been in Area F, with the remaining wards part of Area D.

It was abolished for the 2014 local elections. The Falls and Clonard wards joined the Court District Electoral Area, while the remaining wards became part of a new Black Mountain District Electoral Area.

== Wards ==
Map	Ward	Population (2011 Census)	Catholic	Protestant	Other	No religion	Area	Density	NI Assembly	UK Parliament	Ref
1	Beechmount	5,485	90.8%	6.1%	0.6%	2.5%	0.84 km^{2}	6,530/km^{2}	Belfast West	Belfast West	
2	Clonard	4,975	90.5%	6.4%	0.6%	2.6%	0.61 km^{2}	8,156/km^{2}	Belfast West	Belfast West	
3	Falls	5,184	87.6%	7.5%	2.3%	2.6%	1.2 km^{2}	4,320/km^{2}	Belfast West	Belfast West	
4	Upper Springfield	5,250	93.5%	4.6%	0.3%	1.6%	2.5 km^{2}	2,100/km^{2}	Belfast West	Belfast West	
5	Whiterock	5,694	93.1%	4.7%	0.3%	1.8%	0.78 km^{2}	7,300/km^{2}	Belfast West	Belfast West	
Lower Falls		26,588	91.1%	5.8%	0.3%	1.8%	5.93 km^{2}	4,484 /km^{2}	Belfast West	Belfast West	

== Councillors ==
Election	Councillor (party)	Councillor (party)	Councillor (party)	Councillor (party)	Councillor (party)
2011	Tom Hartley (Sinn Féin)	Jim McVeigh (Sinn Féin)	Steven Corr (Sinn Féin)	Janice Austin (Sinn Féin)	Colin Keenan (SDLP)
2005	Tom Hartley (Sinn Féin)	Marie Moore (Sinn Féin)	Máire Cush (Sinn Féin)	Janice Austin (Sinn Féin)	Fra McCann (Sinn Féin)
2001	Tom Hartley (Sinn Féin)	Marie Moore (Sinn Féin)	Máire Cush (Sinn Féin)	Margaret Walsh (SDLP)	Fra McCann (Sinn Féin)
1997	Tom Hartley (Sinn Féin)	Marie Moore (Sinn Féin)	Seán McKnight (Sinn Féin)	Margaret Walsh (SDLP)	Fra McCann (Sinn Féin)
1993	Tom Hartley (Sinn Féin)	Marie Moore (Sinn Féin)	Mary Muldoon (SDLP)	Patsy McGeown (Sinn Féin)	Fra McCann (Sinn Féin)
1989	Elizabeth Fitzsimons (Sinn Féin)	Seán McKnight (Sinn Féin)	Mary Muldoon (SDLP)	Joe Hendron (SDLP)	Fra McCann (Sinn Féin)
1985	Elizabeth Fitzsimons (Sinn Féin)	Seán McKnight (Sinn Féin)	Seán Keenan (Sinn Féin)	Joe Hendron (SDLP)	Will Glendinning (Alliance)

== 2011 election ==
2005: 5 x Sinn Féin

2011: 4 x Sinn Féin, 1 x SDLP

2005-2011 change: SDLP gain from Sinn Féin

Lower Falls - 5 seats
Party	Candidate	FPv%	Count				
Party	Candidate	FPv%	1	2	3	4	5
Sinn Féin	Janice Austin*	19.66%	1,920				
Sinn Féin	Steven Corr	16.10%	1,572	1,583.85	1,603.85	1,618	1,677
Sinn Féin	Tom Hartley*	15.99%	1,561	1,566.1	1,581.1	1,602.25	1,666.25
Sinn Féin	Jim McVeigh	15.33%	1,497	1,499.7	1,531	1,544.15	1,600.45
SDLP	Colin Keenan	10.24%	1,000	1,003.15	1,058.15	1,214.15	1,326.15
Sinn Féin	Breige Brownlee	8.33%	813	1,070.7	1,109	1,123	1,188.3
éirígí	John McCusker	6.63%	647	647.6	723.6	748.6	
Workers' Party	John Lowry	4.08%	398	398.45	430.45		
Irish Republican Socialist	Jim Gorman	2.14%	209	209.75			
Socialist Party	Pat Lawlor	1.52%	148	148.5			
Electorate: 17,238 Valid: 9,765 (56.65%) Spoilt: 305 Quota: 1,628 Turnout: 10,070 (58.42%)

== 2005 election ==
2001: 4 x Sinn Féin, 1 x SDLP

2005: 5 x Sinn Féin

2001-2005 change: Sinn Féin gain from SDLP

Lower Falls - 5 seats
Party	Candidate	FPv%	Count			
Party	Candidate	FPv%	1	2	3	4
Sinn Féin	Janice Austin	19.42%	2,071			
Sinn Féin	Fra McCann*	19.17%	2,045			
Sinn Féin	Tom Hartley*	18.39%	1,962			
Sinn Féin	Máire Cush*	15.33%	1,764	1,797		
Sinn Féin	Marie Moore*	11.67%	1,245	1,253	1,528.1	1,764.42
SDLP	Margaret Walsh*	11.86%	1,265	1,439	1,449.95	1,476.27
Workers' Party	John Lowry	2.94%	314			
Electorate: 16,334 Valid: 10,666 (65.30%) Spoilt: 392 Quota: 1,778 Turnout: 11,058 (67.70%)

== 2001 election ==
1997: 4 x Sinn Féin, 1 x SDLP

2001: 4 x Sinn Féin, 1 x SDLP

1997-2001 change: No change

Lower Falls - 5 seats
Party	Candidate	FPv%	Count				
Party	Candidate	FPv%	1	2	3	4	5
Sinn Féin	Fra McCann*	18.97%	2,399				
Sinn Féin	Tom Hartley*	18.59%	2,351				
Sinn Féin	Máire Cush	17.63%	2,230				
SDLP	Margaret Walsh*	15.94%	2,016	2,262			
Sinn Féin	Marie Moore*	15.16%	1,917	1,928	1,955.17	1,977.94	1,996.94
Sinn Féin	Sean McKnight*	9.86%	1,247	1,272	1,521.99	1,735.83	1,761.83
Workers' Party	John Lowry	3.86%	488				
Electorate: 18,349 Valid: 12,648 (68.93%) Spoilt: 581 Quota: 2,109 Turnout: 13,229 (72.10%)

== 1997 election ==
1993: 4 x Sinn Féin, 1 x SDLP

1997: 4 x Sinn Féin, 1 x SDLP

1993-1997 change: No change

Lower Falls - 5 seats
Party	Candidate	FPv%	Count			
Party	Candidate	FPv%	1	2	3	4
Sinn Féin	Fra McCann*	19.65%	2,420			
Sinn Féin	Sean McKnight	18.56%	2,286			
SDLP	Margaret Walsh	14.32%	1,764	1,775.4	2,248.7	
Sinn Féin	Tom Hartley*	16.42%	2,022	2,047.05	2,061.05	
Sinn Féin	Marie Moore*	14.70%	1,810	1,822.15	1,829.15	2,033.65
Sinn Féin	Janice Austin	10.34%	1,274	1,581.35	1,606.25	1,625.75
Workers' Party	John Lowry	3.80%	468	468.75		
SDLP	Mary White	1.84%	227	227.9		
Alliance	Keith Jacques	0.37%	45	45.3		
Electorate: 19,372 Valid: 12,316 (63.58%) Spoilt: 390 Quota: 2,053 Turnout: 12,706 (65.59%)

== 1993 election ==
1989: 3 x Sinn Féin, 2 x SDLP

1993: 4 x Sinn Féin, 1 x SDLP

1989-1993 change: Sinn Féin gain from SDLP

Lower Falls - 5 seats
Party	Candidate	FPv%	Count					
Party	Candidate	FPv%	1	2	3	4	5	6
Sinn Féin	Tom Hartley	19.79%	2,573					
Sinn Féin	Fra McCann*	18.40%	2,393					
Sinn Féin	Patrick McGeown	18.09%	2,352					
Sinn Féin	Marie Moore	14.97%	1,946	2,316.77				
SDLP	Mary Muldoon*	13.45%	1,749	1,760.39	1,832.92	1,929.38	2,030.98	2,325.98
SDLP	Margaret Walsh	7.59%	987	991.93	1,049.44	1,134.77	1,165.97	1,306.48
Workers' Party	John Lowry	6.11%	794	804.37	831.54	874.47	924.07	
Alliance	Patrick Woods	0.83%	108	109.87				
Democratic Left	Mary McMahon	0.78%	101	105.24				
Electorate: 19,978 Valid: 13,003 (65.09%) Spoilt: 509 Quota: 2,168 Turnout: 13,512 (67.63%)

== 1989 election ==
1985: 3 x Sinn Féin, 1 x SDLP, 1 x Alliance

1989: 3 x Sinn Féin, 2 x SDLP

1985-1989 change: SDLP gain from Alliance

Lower Falls - 5 seats
Party	Candidate	FPv%	Count				
Party	Candidate	FPv%	1	2	3	4	5
SDLP	Joe Hendron*	23.51%	2,748				
Sinn Féin	Fra McCann	19.73%	2,307				
Sinn Féin	Elizabeth Fitzsimons*	15.10%	1,765	1,786.7	1,816.25	1,849.69	1,885.5
Sinn Féin	Sean McKnight*	12.22%	1,428	1,461.48	1,466.72	1,750.56	1,774.62
SDLP	Mary Muldoon	5.03%	588	1,196.84	1,257.51	1,261.19	1,738.98
Sinn Féin	Richard May	13.91%	1,626	1,634.68	1,637.68	1,651.92	1,679.45
Workers' Party	Mary McMahon	9.35%	1,093	1,186	1,218.75	1,224.19	
Alliance	Derrick Crothers	1.15%	135	164.45			
Electorate: 20,095 Valid: 11,690 (58.17%) Spoilt: 570 Quota: 1,949 Turnout: 12,260 (61.01%)

== 1985 election ==
1985: 3 x Sinn Féin, 1 x SDLP, 1 x Alliance

Lower Falls - 5 seats
Party	Candidate	FPv%	Count			
Party	Candidate	FPv%	1	2	3	4
SDLP	Joe Hendron*	22.06%	2,606			
Sinn Féin	Sean McKnight	16.41%	1,939	1,963	1,985.4	
Alliance	Will Glendinning*	9.42%	1,113	1,195	1,549.48	2,015.48
Sinn Féin	Sean Keenan	14.83%	1,752	1,764	1,795.36	1,845.2
Sinn Féin	Elizabeth Fitzsimons	13.50%	1,595	1,609	1,649.6	1,697.4
Sinn Féin	Fra McCann	12.42%	1,467	1,472	1,499.44	1,552.4
Workers' Party	Mary McMahon	9.44%	1,115	1,168	1,312.2	
SDLP	Sean Mullan	1.35%	159			
Communist	Desmond Murray	0.57%	67			
Electorate: 21,058 Valid: 11,813 (56.10%) Spoilt: 450 Quota: 1,969 Turnout: 12,263 (58.23%)

== See also ==
- Belfast City Council
- Electoral wards of Belfast
- Local government in Northern Ireland
- Members of Belfast City Council
