= Charles Johnston, Baron Johnston of Rockport =

British politician and businessman

The Right Honourable The Lord Johnston of Rockport TD

Member of the House of Lords
- Lord Temporal
- Life peerage 30 March 1987 – 30 April 2002

Personal details
- Born: 4 March 1915
- Died: 30 April 2002 (aged 87)

Charles Collier Johnston, Baron Johnston of Rockport, TD (4 March 1915 – 30 April 2002) was a British Conservative politician and businessman.

The son of Charles Moore Johnston and Muriel Florence Mellon was educated at Rockport School in County Down and in Tonbridge School in Kent. From 1948 to 1976 Johnston was managing director and 1951 to 1977 Chairman of Standex International Ltd. In 1980, he was official observer of the elections in Zimbabwe.

He was commissioned into the Royal Artillery, reaching the rank of Captain. Having been knighted in 1973, he was created a life peer as Baron Johnston of Rockport, of Caversham in the Royal County of Berkshire on 30 March 1987.

Johnston had married twice, Audrey Boyes in 1939 and Yvonne Shearman in 1981. He had two sons from his first wife.
