= Robin Stirling =

Unionist politician from Northern Ireland

Member of Ballymena Borough Council
- In office 7 June 2001 – 5 May 2011
- Preceded by: Desmond Armstrong
- Succeeded by: Beth Clyde
- Constituency: Braid

Personal details
- Born: Ballymena, County Antrim, Northern Ireland
- Party: TUV (since 2007)
- Other political affiliations: DUP (until 2007)

Robin Stirling is a former Unionist politician in Ballymena, County Antrim. Having previously sat on Ballymena Borough Council as a Traditional Unionist Voice (TUV) member and for a period before as a Democratic Unionist Party (DUP) councillor.

== Background ==
He was quoted as strongly opposing a visit from Irish president Mary McAleese to a Ballymena school in 2006.

A former pupil of Ballymena Academy he was critical of the politics of Roger Casement, a fellow attendee of Ballymena Academy and prominent Protestant Irish Nationalist who was previously a British diplomat later executed for treason.

Stirling resigned from the DUP in April 2007 in protest in the DUP's decision to share power with Sinn Féin. To much surprise Stirling supported a Social Democratic and Labour Party (SDLP) councillor becoming mayor of Ballymena in 2008.

He has spoken out on his views of the grammar of the English language being misused and accused former DUP colleagues of using incorrect grammar.

Stirling has also stated he has little faith in a truth commission being set up for victims of The Troubles.

Stirling did not seek re-election in the 2011 local government elections.
