= Tom Hartley (politician) =

Irish politician

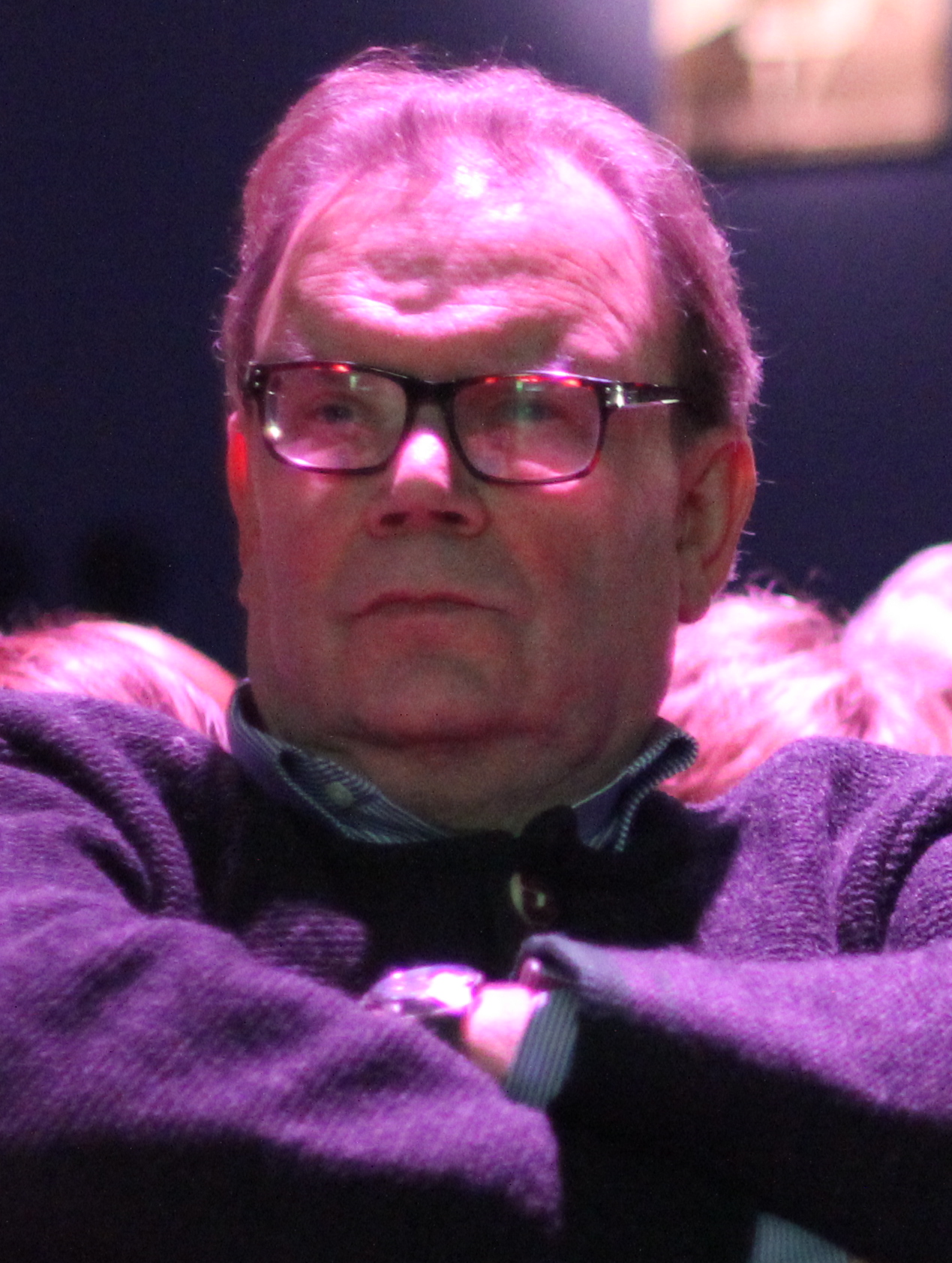
- Hartley in 2016

65th Lord Mayor of Belfast
- In office 1 June 2008 – 1 June 2009
- Preceded by: Jim Rodgers
- Succeeded by: Naomi Long

Belfast City Councillor
- In office 19 May 1993 – 4 September 2013
- Preceded by: Seán McKnight
- Succeeded by: Constituency abolished
- Constituency: Lower Falls

Personal details
- Born: 1945 (age 80–81) Falls Road, Belfast, Northern Ireland
- Party: Sinn Féin
- Occupation: Irish Republican activist and author

Tom Hartley (born 1945) is a historian and Irish republican politician. Hartley grew up in the Falls Road area of Belfast and became a republican activist in the late 1960s. In 1970, he was imprisoned in the Crumlin Road gaol for ten months for riotous behaviour; he was again detained in 1978. During the 1981 Irish hunger strike, Hartley chaired the POW Committee.

Hartley became active in Sinn Féin, serving as the General Secretary in the mid-1980s and the Chairperson in the early 1990s. In 1993, he was elected to Belfast City Council for the Lower Falls and held his seat in each subsequent election until 2013 when he stood down. Hartley was one of three Sinn Féin candidates in Northern Ireland at the European election in 1994. Although he took only 3.8% of the votes cast and was not elected, he did receive more votes than the party's other candidates. In 2008, Hartley became the second Sinn Féin Lord Mayor of Belfast.

In his spare time, he conducts tours of Belfast City Cemetery and authored the book series The History of Belfast, Written in Stone.

== Bibliography ==
- Belfast City Cemetery: The History of Belfast, Written in Stone (2014)
- Milltown Cemetery: The History of Belfast, Written in Stone (2014)
- Balmoral Cemetery: The History of Belfast, Written in Stone (2019)

Party political offices
Preceded by Joe Cahill; Cathleen Knowles	General Secretary of Sinn Féin; 1984–1986?	Succeeded by Joe Reilly?
Preceded by Seán MacManus	Chairperson of Sinn Féin; 1990–1996	Succeeded by Mitchel McLaughlin
Civic offices
Preceded by Jim Rodgers	Lord Mayor of Belfast; 2008–2009	Succeeded by Naomi Long
