= Committee for Infrastructure =

The Committee for Infrastructure is a Northern Ireland Assembly committee established to advise, assist and scrutinise the work of the Department for Infrastructure and the Minister for Infrastructure (currently Liz Kimmins). The committee also plays a key role in the consultation, consideration and development of new legislation.

Until 2016, the committee was called the Committee for Regional Development.

== Membership ==
Membership of the committee is as follows:

| Party | Member | Constituency |
|---|---|---|
| DUP | Peter Martin MLA (Chairperson) | North Down |
| UUP | John Stewart MLA (Deputy Chairperson) | East Antrim |
| Sinn Féin | Cathal Boylan MLA | Newry and Armagh |
| Sinn Féin | Nicola Brogan MLA | West Tyrone |
| DUP | Stephen Dunne MLA | North Down |
| DUP | Harry Harvey MLA | Strangford |
| Alliance | Andrew McMurray MLA | South Down |
| SDLP | Justin McNulty MLA | Newry and Armagh |
| Alliance | Peter McReynolds MLA | Belfast East |

== 2022–2027 Assembly ==
| Party | Member | Constituency |
|---|---|---|
| DUP | Deborah Erskine MLA (Chairperson) | Fermanagh and South Tyrone |
| UUP | John Stewart MLA (Deputy Chairperson) | East Antrim |
| Sinn Féin | Danny Baker MLA | Belfast West |
| Sinn Féin | Cathal Boylan MLA | Newry and Armagh |
| Alliance | Patrick Brown MLA | South Down |
| DUP | Keith Buchanan MLA | Mid Ulster |
| DUP | Stephen Dunne MLA | North Down |
| SDLP | Mark H. Durkan MLA | Foyle |
| Alliance | Peter McReynolds MLA | Belfast East |

=== Changes 2022–2027 ===
| Date | Outgoing member and party | Constituency | → | New member and party | Constituency |
|---|---|---|---|---|---|
| 23 April 2024 | Patrick Brown MLA (Alliance) | South Down | → | Andrew McMurray MLA (Alliance) | South Down |
| 11 February 2025 | Danny Baker MLA (Sinn Féin) | Belfast West | → | Nicola Brogan MLA (Sinn Féin) | West Tyrone |
| 8 September 2025 | Mark H. Durkan MLA (SDLP) | Foyle | → | Justin McNulty MLA (SDLP) | Newry and Armagh |
| 16 September 2025 | Deborah Erskine MLA (Chairperson, DUP) | Fermanagh and South Tyrone | → | Peter Martin MLA (Chairperson, DUP) | North Down |
| 23 September 2025 | Keith Buchanan MLA (DUP) | Mid Ulster | → | Harry Harvey MLA (DUP) | Strangford |

== 2017-2022 Assembly ==
| Party | Member | Constituency |
|---|---|---|
| DUP | Michelle McIlveen MLA (Chairperson) | Strangford |
| DUP | David Hilditch MLA (Deputy Chairperson) | East Antrim |
| UUP | Roy Beggs Jr MLA | East Antrim |
| Sinn Féin | Cathal Boylan MLA | Newry and Armagh |
| DUP | Keith Buchanan MLA | Mid Ulster |
| SDLP | Dolores Kelly MLA | Upper Bann |
| Sinn Féin | Liz Kimmins MLA | Newry and Armagh |
| Sinn Féin | Raymond McCartney MLA | Foyle |
| Alliance | Andrew Muir MLA | North Down |

=== Changes 2017-2022 ===
| Date | Outgoing member and party | Constituency | → | New member and party | Constituency |
|---|---|---|---|---|---|
| 17 February 2020 | Raymond McCartney MLA (Sinn Féin) | Foyle | → | Martina Anderson MLA (Sinn Féin) | Foyle |
| 14 June 2021 | Michelle McIlveen MLA (Chairperson, DUP) | Strangford | → | Jonathan Buckley MLA (Chairperson, DUP) | Upper Bann |
| 21 June 2021 | Keith Buchanan MLA (DUP) | Mid Ulster | → | George Robinson MLA (DUP) | East Londonderry |
| 18 October 2021 | Dolores Kelly MLA (SDLP) | Upper Bann | → | Cara Hunter MLA (SDLP) | East Londonderry |
| 27 September 2021 | Martina Anderson MLA (Sinn Féin) | Foyle | → | Pádraig Delargy MLA (Sinn Féin) | Foyle |

== 2016-2017 Assembly ==
| Party | Member | Constituency |
|---|---|---|
| DUP | William Humphrey MLA (Chairperson) | Belfast North |
| DUP | William Irwin MLA (Deputy Chairperson) | Newry and Armagh |
| Alliance | Kellie Armstrong MLA | Strangford |
| DUP | Alex Easton MLA | North Down |
| DUP | Paul Girvan MLA | South Antrim |
| Sinn Féin | Declan McAleer MLA | West Tyrone |
| People Before Profit | Eamonn McCann MLA | Foyle |
| Sinn Féin | Fra McCann MLA | Belfast West |
| SDLP | Daniel McCrossan MLA | West Tyrone |
| SDLP | Justin McNulty MLA | Newry and Armagh |
| UUP | Jenny Palmer MLA | Lagan Valley |

=== Changes 2016-2017 ===
| Date | Outgoing member and party | Constituency | → | New member and party | Constituency |
|---|---|---|---|---|---|
| 13 June 2016 | William Irwin MLA (Deputy Chairperson, DUP) | Newry and Armagh | → | George Robinson MLA (Deputy Chairperson, DUP) | East Londonderry |

== 2011-2016 Assembly ==
| Party | Member | Constituency |
|---|---|---|
| DUP | Jimmy Spratt MLA (Chairperson) | Belfast South |
| Sinn Féin | Pat Doherty MLA (Deputy Chairperson) | West Tyrone |
| UUP | Roy Beggs Jr MLA | East Antrim |
| SDLP | Joe Byrne MLA | West Tyrone |
| Sinn Féin | Cathal Ó hOisín MLA | East Londonderry |
| SDLP | Dolores Kelly MLA | Upper Bann |
| Alliance | Trevor Lunn MLA | Lagan Valley |
| Sinn Féin | Seán Lynch MLA | Fermanagh and South Tyrone |
| DUP | Ian McCrea MLA | Mid Ulster |
| DUP | Stephen Moutray MLA | Upper Bann |
| UUP | Mike Nesbitt MLA | Strangford |
| Sinn Féin | Cathal Ó hOisín MLA | East Londonderry |

=== Changes 2011-2016 ===
| Date | Outgoing member and party | Constituency | → | New member and party | Constituency |
|---|---|---|---|---|---|
| 6 June 2011 | Trevor Lunn MLA (Alliance) | Lagan Valley | → | Stewart Dickson MLA (Alliance) | East Antrim |
| 26 September 2011 | Mike Nesbitt MLA (UUP) | Strangford | → | Michael Copeland MLA (UUP) | Belfast East |
| 6 February 2012 | Michael Copeland MLA (UUP) | Belfast East | → | David McNarry MLA (UUP) | Strangford |
| 23 April 2012 | Joe Byrne MLA (SDLP) | West Tyrone | → | John Dallat MLA (SDLP) | East Londonderry |
| 23 April 2012 | Roy Beggs Jr MLA (UUP) | East Antrim | → | Ross Hussey MLA (UUP) | West Tyrone |
| 2 July 2012 | Pat Doherty MLA (Deputy Chairperson, Sinn Féin) | West Tyrone | → | Seán Lynch MLA (Deputy Chairperson, Sinn Féin) | Fermanagh and South Tyrone |
| 1 October 2012 | Stephen Moutray MLA (DUP) | Upper Bann | → | Alex Easton MLA (DUP) | North Down |
| 16 September 2013 | Ian McCrea MLA (DUP) | Mid Ulster | → | Brenda Hale MLA (DUP) | Lagan Valley |
| 1 October 2013 | Stewart Dickson MLA (Alliance) | East Antrim | → | Kieran McCarthy MLA (Alliance) | Strangford |
| 7 October 2013 | Dolores Kelly MLA (SDLP) | Upper Bann | → | Joe Byrne MLA (SDLP) | West Tyrone |
| 24 September 2014 | Jimmy Spratt MLA (Chairperson, DUP) | Belfast South | → | Trevor Clarke MLA (Chairperson, DUP) | South Antrim |
| 29 September 2014 | Kieran McCarthy MLA (Alliance) | Strangford | → | Chris Lyttle MLA (Alliance) | Belfast East |
| 6 October 2014 | Brenda Hale MLA (DUP) | Lagan Valley | → | Stephen Moutray MLA (DUP) | Upper Bann |
| 30 June 2015 | Ross Hussey MLA (UUP) | West Tyrone | → | Adrian Cochrane-Watson MLA (UUP) | South Antrim |
| 7 September 2015 | Joe Byrne MLA (SDLP) | West Tyrone | → | Claire Hanna MLA (SDLP) | Belfast South |
| 5 October 2015 | Alex Easton MLA (DUP) | North Down | → | Brenda Hale MLA (DUP) | Lagan Valley |
| 12 January 2016 | Claire Hanna MLA (SDLP) | Belfast South | → | Daniel McCrossan MLA (SDLP) | West Tyrone |

== 2007-2011 Assembly ==
| Party | Member | Constituency |
|---|---|---|
| UUP | Fred Cobain MLA (Chairperson) | Belfast North |
| DUP | Jim Wells MLA (Deputy Chairperson) | South Down |
| Sinn Féin | Cathal Boylan MLA | Newry and Armagh |
| Sinn Féin | Willie Clarke MLA | South Down |
| SDLP | John Dallat MLA | East Londonderry |
| DUP | William Irwin MLA | Newry and Armagh |
| UUP | John McCallister MLA | South Down |
| Sinn Féin | Raymond McCartney MLA | Foyle |
| DUP | Stephen Moutray MLA | Upper Bann |
| DUP | George Robinson MLA | South Down |
| Green (NI) | Brian Wilson MLA | North Down |

=== Changes 2007-2011 ===
| Date | Outgoing member and party | Constituency | → | New member and party | Constituency |
|---|---|---|---|---|---|
| 15 September 2008 | William Irwin MLA (DUP) | Newry and Armagh | → | Allan Bresland MLA (DUP) | West Tyrone |
| 15 September 2008 | Stephen Moutray MLA (DUP) | Upper Bann | → | Alastair Ross MLA (DUP) | East Antrim |
| 22 June 2009 | John McCallister MLA (UUP) | South Down | → | Danny Kinahan MLA (UUP) | South Antrim |
| 29 June 2009 | John Dallat MLA (SDLP) | East Londonderry | → | Tommy Gallagher MLA (SDLP) | Fermanagh and South Tyrone |
| 4 July 2009 | Jim Wells MLA (Deputy Chairperson, DUP) | South Down | → | Michelle McIlveen MLA (Deputy Chairperson, DUP) | Strangford |
| 16 September 2009 | Alastair Ross MLA (DUP) | East Antrim | → | Ian McCrea MLA (DUP) | Mid Ulster |
| 14 April 2010 | Raymond McCartney MLA (Sinn Féin) | Foyle | → | Billy Leonard MLA (Sinn Féin) | East Londonderry |
| 14 April 2010 | Brian Wilson MLA (Green) | North Down | → | Trevor Lunn MLA (Alliance) | Lagan Valley |
| 25 May 2010 | Tommy Gallagher MLA (SDLP) | Fermanagh and South Tyrone | → | Conall McDevitt MLA (SDLP) | Belfast South |
| 14 September 2010 | Willie Clarke MLA (Sinn Féin) | South Down | → | Fra McCann MLA (Sinn Féin) | Belfast West |
| 2 November 2010 | Danny Kinahan MLA (UUP) | South Antrim | → | Billy Armstrong MLA (UUP) | Mid Ulster |
| 16 September 2010 | Trevor Lunn MLA (Alliance) | Lagan Valley | → | Anna Lo MLA (Alliance) | Belfast South |

== 1998-2003 Assembly ==
| Party | Member | Constituency |
|---|---|---|
| SDLP | Alban Maginness MLA (Chairperson) | Belfast North |
| UUP | Alan McFarland MLA (Deputy Chairperson) | North Down |
| SDLP | Joe Byrne MLA | West Tyrone |
| PUP | David Ervine MLA | Belfast East |
| DUP | William Hay MLA | Foyle |
| UUP | Derek Hussey MLA | West Tyrone |
| SDLP | Denis Haughey MLA | Mid Ulster |
| UK Unionist | Roger Hutchinson MLA | East Antrim |
| Sinn Féin | Conor Murphy MLA | Newry and Armagh |
| UUP | John Taylor MLA | Strangford |
| DUP | Jim Wells MLA | South Down |

=== Changes 1998-2003 ===
| Date | Outgoing member and party | Constituency | → | New member and party | Constituency |
|---|---|---|---|---|---|
| 26 January 2000 | Denis Haughey MLA (SDLP) | Mid Ulster | → | P. J. Bradley MLA (SDLP) | South Down |
| 18 September 2000 | Conor Murphy MLA (Sinn Féin) | Newry and Armagh | → | Pat McNamee MLA (Sinn Féin) | Newry and Armagh |
| 21 November 2000 | John Taylor MLA (UUP) | Strangford | → | Vacant | |
| 15 January 2001 | Vacant | | → | George Savage MLA (UUP) | Upper Bann |
| 12 February 2001 | Jim Wells MLA (DUP) | South Down | → | Mark Robinson MLA (DUP) | Belfast South |

== See also ==
- Committee
