= Committee for Agriculture, Environment and Rural Affairs =

The Committee for Agriculture, Environment and Rural Affairs was established in Northern Ireland to advise and assist the Department of Agriculture, Environment and Rural Affairs and the Minister for Agriculture, Environment and Rural Affairs (currently Andrew Muir), on matters within his responsibility as a Minister. The committee undertakes a scrutiny, policy development and consultation role with respect to the Department of Agriculture, Environment and Rural Affairs and plays a key role in the consideration and development of legislation.

Until 2016, the committee was called the Committee for Agriculture and Rural Development.

== Membership ==
Membership of the committee is as follows:

Party	Member	Constituency
UUP	Robbie Butler MLA (Chairperson)	Lagan Valley
Sinn Féin	Declan McAleer MLA (Deputy Chairperson)	West Tyrone
Alliance	John Blair MLA	South Antrim
DUP	Tom Buchanan MLA	West Tyrone
Sinn Féin	Aoife Finnegan MLA	Newry and Armagh
DUP	William Irwin MLA	Newry and Armagh
SDLP	Daniel McCrossan MLA	West Tyrone
DUP	Michelle McIlveen MLA	Strangford
Sinn Féin	Áine Murphy MLA	Fermanagh and South Tyrone

== 2022–2027 Assembly ==
The committee will meet for the first time in the 2022–2027 Assembly on 14 February 2024.

Party	Member	Constituency
UUP	Tom Elliott MLA (Chairperson)	Fermanagh and South Tyrone
Sinn Féin	Declan McAleer MLA (Deputy Chairperson)	West Tyrone
Alliance	John Blair MLA	South Antrim
Sinn Féin	Nicola Brogan MLA	West Tyrone
DUP	Tom Buchanan MLA	West Tyrone
DUP	William Irwin MLA	Newry and Armagh
SDLP	Patsy McGlone MLA	Mid Ulster
DUP	Michelle McIlveen MLA	Strangford
Sinn Féin	Áine Murphy MLA	Fermanagh and South Tyrone

=== Changes 2022–2027 ===
Date	Outgoing member and party	Constituency	→	New member and party	Constituency
30 September 2024	Tom Elliott MLA (Chairperson, UUP)	Fermanagh and South Tyrone	→	Robbie Butler MLA (Chairperson, UUP)	Lagan Valley
17 February 2025	Nicola Brogan MLA (Sinn Féin)	West Tyrone	→	Aoife Finnegan MLA (Sinn Féin)	Newry and Armagh
8 September 2025	Patsy McGlone MLA (SDLP)	Mid Ulster	→	Daniel McCrossan MLA (SDLP)	West Tyrone

== 2017-2022 Assembly ==
The committee met for the first time in the 2017–2022 Assembly on 21 January 2020.

Party	Member	Constituency
Sinn Féin	Declan McAleer MLA (Chairperson)	West Tyrone
Sinn Féin	Philip McGuigan MLA (Deputy Chairperson)	North Antrim
Green (NI)	Clare Bailey MLA	Belfast South
UUP	Rosemary Barton MLA	Fermanagh and South Tyrone
Alliance	John Blair MLA	South Antrim
DUP	Maurice Bradley MLA	East Londonderry
SDLP	John Dallat MLA	East Londonderry
DUP	Harry Harvey MLA	Strangford
DUP	William Irwin MLA	Newry and Armagh

=== Changes 2017–2022 ===
Date	Outgoing member and party	Constituency	→	New member and party	Constituency
9 March 2020	John Dallat MLA (SDLP)	East Londonderry	→	Pat Catney MLA (SDLP)	Lagan Valley
26 May 2020	Pat Catney MLA (SDLP)	Lagan Valley	→	Patsy McGlone MLA (SDLP)	Mid Ulster
20 September 2021	Maurice Bradley MLA (DUP)	East Londonderry	→	Tom Buchanan MLA (DUP)	West Tyrone

== 2016-2017 Assembly ==
The committee met for the first time in the 2016–2017 Assembly on 2 June 2016.

Party	Member	Constituency
Sinn Féin	Linda Dillon MLA (Chairperson)	Mid Ulster
Sinn Féin	Caoimhe Archibald MLA (Deputy Chairperson)	East Londonderry
DUP	Sydney Anderson MLA	Upper Bann
DUP	Maurice Bradley MLA	East Londonderry
Alliance	David Ford MLA	South Antrim
DUP	William Irwin MLA	Newry and Armagh
SDLP	Patsy McGlone MLA	Mid Ulster
UUP	Harold McKee MLA	South Down
Sinn Féin	Oliver McMullan MLA	East Antrim
DUP	Edwin Poots MLA	Lagan Valley
UUP	Robin Swann MLA	North Antrim

=== Changes 2016–2017 ===
Date	Outgoing member and party	Constituency	→	New member and party	Constituency
2 December 2016	Linda Dillon MLA (Chairperson, Sinn Féin)	Mid Ulster	→	Caoimhe Archibald MLA (Chairperson, Sinn Féin)	East Londonderry
2 December 2016	Caoimhe Archibald MLA (Deputy Chairperson, Sinn Féin)	East Londonderry	→	Oliver McMullan MLA (Deputy Chairperson, Sinn Féin)	East Antrim

== 2011-2016 Assembly ==
The committee met for the first time in the 2016–2017 Assembly in May 2011.

Party	Member	Constituency
DUP	Paul Frew MLA (Chairperson)	North Antrim
SDLP	Dolores Kelly MLA (Deputy Chairperson)	Upper Bann
DUP	Tom Buchanan MLA	West Tyrone
DUP	Trevor Clarke MLA	South Antrim
Sinn Féin	Willie Clarke MLA	South Down
UUP	Jo-Anne Dobson MLA	Upper Bann
DUP	William Irwin MLA	Newry and Armagh
Sinn Féin	Oliver McMullan MLA	East Antrim
Alliance	Kieran McCarthy MLA	Strangford
Sinn Féin	Conor Murphy MLA	Newry and Armagh
UUP	Robin Swann MLA	North Antrim

=== Changes 2011–2016 ===
Date	Outgoing member and party	Constituency	→	New member and party	Constituency
23 January 2012	Conor Murphy MLA (Sinn Féin)	Newry and Armagh	→	Michaela Boyle MLA (Sinn Féin)	West Tyrone
17 April 2012	Willie Clarke MLA (Sinn Féin)	South Down	→	Vacant	
8 May 2012	Vacant		→	Chris Hazzard MLA (Sinn Féin)	South Down
21 May 2012	Dolores Kelly MLA (Deputy Chairperson, SDLP)	Upper Bann	→	Joe Byrne MLA (Deputy Chairperson, SDLP)	West Tyrone
10 September 2012	Michaela Boyle MLA (Sinn Féin)	West Tyrone	→	Declan McAleer MLA (Sinn Féin)	West Tyrone
4 December 2012	Robin Swann MLA (UUP)	North Antrim	→	Danny Kinahan MLA (UUP)	South Antrim
21 January 2013	Danny Kinahan MLA (UUP)	South Antrim	→	Robin Swann MLA (UUP)	North Antrim
15 April 2013	Chris Hazzard MLA (Sinn Féin)	South Down	→	Ian Milne MLA (Sinn Féin)	Mid Ulster
16 September 2013	Trevor Clarke MLA (DUP)	South Antrim	→	Michelle McIlveen MLA (DUP)	Strangford
1 October 2013	Kieran McCarthy MLA (Alliance)	Strangford	→	Trevor Lunn MLA (Alliance)	Lagan Valley
27 January 2014	Trevor Lunn MLA (Alliance)	Lagan Valley	→	Judith Cochrane MLA (Alliance)	Belfast East
4 July 2014	Robin Swann MLA (UUP)	North Antrim	→	Tom Elliott MLA (UUP)	Fermanagh and South Tyrone
24 September 2014	Paul Frew MLA (Chairperson, DUP)	North Antrim	→	William Irwin MLA (Chairperson, DUP)	Newry and Armagh
29 September 2014	Judith Cochrane MLA (Alliance)	Belfast East	→	Kieran McCarthy MLA (Alliance)	Strangford
6 October 2014	Paul Frew MLA (DUP)	North Antrim	→	Sydney Anderson MLA (DUP)	Upper Bann
6 October 2014	Michelle McIlveen MLA (DUP)	Strangford	→	Edwin Poots MLA (DUP)	Lagan Valley
30 June 2015	Tom Elliott MLA (UUP)	Fermanagh and South Tyrone	→	Robin Swann MLA (UUP)	North Antrim
5 October 2015	Tom Buchanan MLA (DUP)	North Antrim	→	Ian McCrea MLA (DUP)	Mid Ulster
11 January 2016	Joe Byrne MLA (Deputy Chairperson, SDLP)	West Tyrone	→	Seán Rogers MLA (Deputy Chairperson, SDLP)	South Down

== 2007-2011 Assembly ==
The committee met for the first time in the 2016–2017 Assembly in May 2007.

Party	Member	Constituency
DUP	William McCrea MLA (Chairperson)	South Antrim
UUP	Tom Elliott MLA (Deputy Chairperson)	Fermanagh and South Tyrone
SDLP	P. J. Bradley MLA	South Down
DUP	Allan Bresland MLA	West Tyrone
SDLP	Thomas Burns MLA	South Antrim
DUP	Trevor Clarke MLA	South Antrim
Sinn Féin	Willie Clarke MLA	South Down
Sinn Féin	Gerry McHugh MLA	Fermanagh and South Tyrone
DUP	William Irwin MLA	Newry and Armagh
Sinn Féin	Francie Molloy MLA	Mid Ulster
UUP	George Savage MLA	Upper Bann

=== Changes 2007-2011 ===
Date	Outgoing member and party	Constituency	→	New member and party	Constituency
21 January 2008	Gerry McHugh MLA (Sinn Féin)	Fermanagh and South Tyrone	→	Pat Doherty MLA (Sinn Féin)	West Tyrone
14 September 2008	Allan Bresland MLA (DUP)	West Tyrone	→	Edwin Poots MLA (DUP)	Lagan Valley
28 May 2009	P. J. Bradley MLA (SDLP)	South Down	→	Patsy McGlone MLA (SDLP)	Mid Ulster
4 July 2007	Trevor Clarke MLA (DUP)	South Antrim	→	Ian Paisley Jr MLA (DUP)	North Antrim
4 July 2007	Edwin Poots MLA (DUP)	Lagan Valley	→	Jim Shannon MLA (DUP)	Strangford
4 July 2009	William McCrea MLA (Chairperson, DUP)	South Antrim	→	Ian Paisley Jr MLA (Chairperson, DUP)	North Antrim
9 March 2010	Patsy McGlone MLA (SDLP)	Mid Ulster	→	P. J. Bradley MLA (SDLP)	South Down
14 April 2010	Thomas Burns MLA (SDLP)	South Antrim	→	Kieran McCarthy MLA (Alliance)	Strangford
23 June 2010	Ian Paisley Jr MLA (Chairperson, DUP)	North Antrim	→	Stephen Moutray MLA (Chairperson, DUP)	Upper Bann
1 July 2010	William McCrea MLA (DUP)	South Antrim	→	Vacant	
3 August 2010	Jim Shannon MLA (DUP)	Strangford	→	Vacant	
14 September 2010	Vacant		→	Trevor Clarke MLA (DUP)	South Antrim
14 September 2010	Vacant		→	Simpson Gibson MLA (DUP)	Strangford
6 October 2010	Tom Elliott MLA (Deputy Chairperson, UUP)	Fermanagh and South Tyrone	→	Roy Beggs Jr MLA (Chairperson, UUP)	East Antrim

== 1998-2003 Assembly ==
The committee met for the first time in the 2016–2017 Assembly in November 1999.

Party	Member	Constituency
DUP	Ian Paisley MLA (Chairperson)	North Antrim
UUP	Billy Armstrong MLA	Mid Ulster
SDLP	P. J. Bradley MLA	South Down
Ind. Unionist	Boyd Douglas MLA	East Londonderry
Alliance	David Ford MLA	South Antrim
SDLP	Denis Haughey MLA	Mid Ulster
DUP	Gardiner Kane MLA	North Antrim
DUP	Ian Paisley Jr MLA	North Antrim
Sinn Féin	Francie Molloy MLA	Mid Ulster
UUP	George Savage MLA	Upper Bann

=== Changes 1998-2003 ===
Date	Outgoing member and party	Constituency	→	New member and party	Constituency
24 January 2000	Denis Haughey MLA (SDLP)	Mid Ulster	→	John Dallat MLA (SDLP)	East Londonderry
4 February 2002	Francie Molloy MLA (Sinn Féin)	Mid Ulster	→	Mick Murphy MLA (Sinn Féin)	South Down
1 July 2002	Mick Murphy MLA (Sinn Féin)	South Down	→	Pat Doherty MLA (Sinn Féin)	West Tyrone

== See also ==
- Department of Agriculture, Environment and Rural Affairs
