= Brenda Hale =

Brenda Hale may refer to:

- Brenda Hale (Northern Ireland politician) (born 1968), Democratic Unionist Party MLA
- Brenda Hale, Baroness Hale of Richmond (born 1945), judge and President of the Supreme Court of the United Kingdom
