= West Tyrone (Assembly constituency) =

Constituency of the Northern Ireland Assembly

Coordinates: 54.502°N 7.532°W

- Northern Ireland Assembly; Parliamentary constituency
- West Tyrone shown within Northern Ireland

Current constituency
- Created: 1996
- Seats: 6 (1996–2016); 5 (2017–)
- MLAs: Paul Boggs (SF); Thomas Buchanan (DUP); Nicola Brogan (SF); Declan McAleer (SF); Daniel McCrossan (SDLP)
- Districts: Derry and Strabane District Council

West Tyrone is a constituency in the Northern Ireland Assembly.

The seat was first used for a Northern Ireland-only election for the Northern Ireland Forum in 1996. Since 1998, it has elected members to the current Assembly.

For Assembly elections prior to 1996, the constituency was largely part of the Mid Ulster constituency with a smaller section coming from Fermanagh and South Tyrone constituency. Since 1997, it has shared boundaries with the West Tyrone UK Parliament constituency.

For further details of the history and boundaries of the constituency, see West Tyrone (UK Parliament constituency).

== Members ==
Election	MLA (party)	MLA (party)	MLA (party)	MLA (party)	MLA (party)	MLA (party)
1996	Barry McElduff (Sinn Féin)	5 seats 1996–1998	Paddy McGowan (SDLP)	Joe Byrne (SDLP)	Oliver Gibson (DUP)	Derek Hussey (UUP)
1998	Barry McElduff (Sinn Féin)	Pat Doherty (Sinn Féin)	Eugene McMenamin (SDLP)	Joe Byrne (SDLP)	Oliver Gibson (DUP)	Derek Hussey (UUP)
2003	Barry McElduff (Sinn Féin)	Pat Doherty (Sinn Féin)	Eugene McMenamin (SDLP)	Kieran Deeny (Independent)	Thomas Buchanan (DUP)	Derek Hussey (UUP)
2007	Barry McElduff (Sinn Féin)	Pat Doherty (Sinn Féin)	Claire McGill (Sinn Féin)	Kieran Deeny (Independent)	Thomas Buchanan (DUP)	Allan Bresland (DUP)
2011	Barry McElduff (Sinn Féin)	Pat Doherty (Sinn Féin)	Michaela Boyle (Sinn Féin)	Joe Byrne (SDLP)	Thomas Buchanan (DUP)	Ross Hussey (UUP)
July 2012 co-option	Barry McElduff (Sinn Féin)	Declan McAleer (Sinn Féin)	Michaela Boyle (Sinn Féin)	Joe Byrne (SDLP)	Thomas Buchanan (DUP)	Ross Hussey (UUP)
December 2015 co-option	Barry McElduff (Sinn Féin)	Declan McAleer (Sinn Féin)	Michaela Boyle (Sinn Féin)	Daniel McCrossan (SDLP)	Thomas Buchanan (DUP)	Ross Hussey (UUP)
2016	Barry McElduff (Sinn Féin)	Declan McAleer (Sinn Féin)	Michaela Boyle (Sinn Féin)	Daniel McCrossan (SDLP)	Thomas Buchanan (DUP)	Ross Hussey (UUP)
2017	Barry McElduff (Sinn Féin)	Declan McAleer (Sinn Féin)	Michaela Boyle (Sinn Féin)	Daniel McCrossan (SDLP)	Thomas Buchanan (DUP)	5 seats 2017–present
June 2017 co-option	Catherine Kelly (Sinn Féin)	Declan McAleer (Sinn Féin)	Michaela Boyle (Sinn Féin)	Daniel McCrossan (SDLP)	Thomas Buchanan (DUP)	5 seats 2017–present
May 2019 co-option	Catherine Kelly (Sinn Féin)	Declan McAleer (Sinn Féin)	Maolíosa McHugh (Sinn Féin)	Daniel McCrossan (SDLP)	Thomas Buchanan (DUP)	5 seats 2017–present
November 2020 co-option	Nicola Brogan (Sinn Féin)	Declan McAleer (Sinn Féin)	Maolíosa McHugh (Sinn Féin)	Daniel McCrossan (SDLP)	Thomas Buchanan (DUP)	5 seats 2017–present
2022	Nicola Brogan (Sinn Féin)	Declan McAleer (Sinn Féin)	Maolíosa McHugh (Sinn Féin)	Daniel McCrossan (SDLP)	Thomas Buchanan (DUP)	5 seats 2017–present
September 2026 co-option	Nicola Brogan (Sinn Féin)	Declan McAleer (Sinn Féin)	Paul Boggs (Sinn Féin)	Daniel McCrossan (SDLP)	Thomas Buchanan (DUP)	5 seats 2017–present

Note: The columns in this table are used only for presentational purposes, and no significance should be attached to the order of columns. For details of the order in which seats were won at each election, see the detailed results of that election.

== Elections ==
=== Northern Ireland Assembly ===
==== 2027 ====
2027 Assembly election: West Tyrone – 5 seats
Party	Candidate	FPv%	Count
Party	Candidate	FPv%	1
Sinn Féin	Órfhlaith Begley		
Sinn Féin	Paul Boggs		
Sinn Féin	Nicola Brogan		
Sinn Féin	Declan McAleer		
TUV	Stevan Patterson		

==== 2022 ====
2022 Assembly election: West Tyrone – 5 seats
Party	Candidate	FPv%	Count					
Party	Candidate	FPv%	1	2	3	4	5	6
Sinn Féin	**Nicola Brogan**	18.75%	**8,626**					
SDLP	**Daniel McCrossan**	11.92%	5,483	5,555	5,849	6,330	6,508	**8,288**
DUP	**Thomas Buchanan**	14.44%	6,640	6,642	6,739	6,751	7,634	**7,798**
Sinn Féin	**Maoliosa McHugh**	14.48%	6,658	7,047	7,189	7,567	7,571	**7,731**
Sinn Féin	**Declan McAleer**	13.79%	6,343	6,731	6,888	7,111	7,113	**7,592**
TUV	Trevor Clarke	9.06%	4,166	4,166	4,199	4,207	4,704	4,885
Alliance	Stephen Donnelly	6.45%	2,967	3,026	3,327	3,476	3,777	
UUP	Ian Marshall	4.08%	1,876	1,877	1,911	1,918		
Independent	Paul Gallagher	3.66%	1,682	1,688	1,895			
Aontú	James Hope	1.43%	657	661				
People Before Profit	Carol Gallagher	0.77%	354	358				
Green (NI)	Susan Glass	0.55%	252	255				
Socialist Party	Amy Ferguson	0.37%	171	173				
Independent	Barry Brown	0.26%	119	125				
Electorate: 69,702 Valid: 45,994 (65.99%) Spoilt: 635 Quota: 7,666 Turnout: 46,629 (66.90%)

==== 2017 ====
2017 Assembly election: West Tyrone – 5 seats
Party	Candidate	FPv%	Count				
Party	Candidate	FPv%	1	2	3	4	5
DUP	**Thomas Buchanan**	20.45%	**9,064**				
Sinn Féin	**Michaela Boyle**	17.40%	**7,714**				
Sinn Féin	**Barry McElduff**	17.09%	**7,573**				
SDLP	**Daniel McCrossan**	14.17%	6,283	6,300	6,333	6,343	**7,682**
Sinn Féin	**Declan McAleer**	13.61%	6,034	6,035	6,289	6,421	**7,035**
UUP	Alicia Clarke	8.24%	3,654	4,689	4,689	4,690	6,275
TUV	Charlie Chittick	1.92%	851	1,429	1,429	1,429	
Alliance	Stephen Donnelly	2.82%	1,252	1,260	1,264	1,266	
Independent	Sorcha McAnespy	1.95%	864	866	871	875	
Green (NI)	Ciaran McClean	0.93%	412	416	417	418	
Citizens Independent Social Thought Alliance	Barry Brown	0.84%	373	381	384	385	
Independent	Corey French	0.22%	98	99	101	102	
Independent	Roisin McMackin	0.19%	85	86	86	86	
Independent	Susan-Anne White	0.09%	41	45	45	45	
NI Conservatives	Roger Lomas	0.06%	27	32	32	32	
Electorate: 64,258 Valid: 44,325 (68.98%) Spoilt: 582 Quota: 7,388 Turnout: 44,907 (69.89%)

==== 2016 ====
2016 Assembly election: West Tyrone – 6 seats
Party	Candidate	FPv%	Count										
Party	Candidate	FPv%	1	2	3	4	5	6	7	8	9	10	11
SDLP	**Daniel McCrossan**	11.05%	4,287	4,297	4,343	4,434	4,482	4,600	4,880	**5,552**			
DUP	**Thomas Buchanan**	11.98%	4,650	4,652	4,673	4,685	4,699	4,709	4,728	4,766	**8,370**		
UUP	**Ross Hussey**	11.44%	4,441	4,454	4,486	4,563	4,596	4,663	4,705	4,848	5,124	**7,932**	
Sinn Féin	**Barry McElduff**	11.77%	4,568	4,568	4,588	4,597	4,671	4,715	4,916	5,250	5,252	5,252	**5,263**
Sinn Féin	**Michaela Boyle**	11.49%	4,460	4,460	4,495	4,505	4,574	4,599	4,806	4,953	4,955	4,959	**4,993**
Sinn Féin	**Declan McAleer**	9.19%	3,565	3,566	3,575	3,581	3,619	3,644	3,775	4,009	4,009	4,009	**4,017**
Sinn Féin	Grace McDermott	9.56%	3,711	3,711	3,721	3,727	3,750	3,774	3,865	3,974	3,974	3,974	3,996
DUP	Allan Bresland	10.01%	3,884	3,887	3,897	3,902	3,919	3,924	3,941	3,952			
Independent	Josephine Deehan	4.58%	1,778	1,779	1,818	1,893	1,944	2,066	2,607				
Independent	Sorcha McAnespy	2.13%	828	828	849	871	932	1,003					
Independent	Patsy Kelly	1.70%	661	662	703	726	742	763					
Green (NI)	Ciaran McClean	1.18%	458	461	513	619	714						
CISTA	Barry Brown	1.41%	547	549	582	612							
Alliance	Stephen Donnelly	1.27%	494	495	506								
Animal Welfare	Laura McAnea	0.58%	224	225									
Independent	Corey French	0.32%	124	125									
Independent	Susan-Anne White	0.22%	85	86									
NI Conservatives	Roger Lomas	0.11%	44										
Electorate: 65,694 Valid: 38,809 (59.08%) Spoilt: 516 Quota: 5,545 Turnout: 39,325 (59.86%)

==== 2011 ====
2011 Assembly election: West Tyrone – 6 seats
Party	Candidate	FPv%	Count				
Party	Candidate	FPv%	1	2	3	4	5
Sinn Féin	**Barry McElduff**	15.29%	**6,008**				
Sinn Féin	**Pat Doherty**	14.32%	**5,630**				
Sinn Féin	**Michaela Boyle**	12.86%	5,053	5,089.3	5,445.94	**7,791.94**	
SDLP	**Joe Byrne**	8.53%	3,353	3,372.08	4,555.86	4,918.98	**5,320.98**
DUP	**Thomas Buchanan**	12.79%	5,027	5,027.42	5,133.66	5,143.8	**5,162.8**
UUP	**Ross Hussey**	10.36%	4,072	4,073.08	4,365.88	4,394.94	**4,397.94**
DUP	Allan Bresland	10.33%	4,059	4,059.18	4,115.18	4,116.78	4,123.78
Sinn Féin	Declan McAleer	7.65%	3,008	3,272.9	3,576.4		
Independent	Paddy McGowan	2.91%	1,145	1,158.92			
Independent	Eugene McMenamin	2.79%	1,096	1,099.18			
Alliance	Eric Bullick	2.17%	852	854.04			
Electorate: 62,970 Valid: 39,303 (62.42%) Spoilt: 1,020 Quota: 5,615 Turnout: 40,323 (64.04%)

==== 2007 ====
2007 Assembly election: West Tyrone – 6 seats
Party	Candidate	FPv%	Count						
Party	Candidate	FPv%	1	2	3	4	5	6	7
Sinn Féin	**Barry McElduff**	16.82%	**6,971**						
Sinn Féin	**Pat Doherty**	16.18%	**6,709**						
Sinn Féin	**Claire McGill**	11.48%	4,757	5,599.85	**6,217.39**				
DUP	**Thomas Buchanan**	11.16%	4,625	4,625.3	4,625.41	4,690.71	4,697.82	**6,207.82**	
Independent	**Kieran Deeny**	9.11%	3,776	3,847.7	3,873.66	4,259.05	4,831.92	5,559.89	**5,615.88**
DUP	**Allan Bresland**	10.24%	4,244	4,244.45	4,244.89	4,286.04	4,308.04	5,543.04	**5,543.37**
SDLP	Josephine Deehan	6.49%	2,689	2,741.8	2,773.37	3,280.48	4,886.49	5,085.23	5,185.55
UUP	Derek Hussey	8.89%	3,686	3,686.9	3,687.78	3,761.3	3,813.48		
SDLP	Eugene McMenamin	5.48%	2,272	2,290.75	2,328.15	2,700.96			
SDLP	Seamus Shields	2.55%	1,057	1,098.85	1,105.56				
Republican Sinn Féin	Joe O'Neill	1.08%	448	454.75	461.68				
UK Unionist	Robert McCartney	0.53%	220	220.9	222.33				
Electorate: 58,367 Valid: 41,454 (71.02%) Spoilt: 385 Quota: 5,923 Turnout: 41,839 (71.68%)

==== 2003 ====
2003 Assembly election: West Tyrone – 6 seats
Party	Candidate	FPv%	Count							
Party	Candidate	FPv%	1	2	3	4	5	6	7	8
Independent	**Kieran Deeny**	14.76%	**6,158**							
Sinn Féin	**Pat Doherty**	14.42%	**6,019**							
DUP	**Thomas Buchanan**	11.36%	4,739	4,743.8	4,977.64	4,977.67	**7,222.67**			
UUP	**Derek Hussey**	8.95%	3,733	3,742.66	5,477.33	5,477.47	5,902.94	**7,138.19**		
Sinn Féin	**Barry McElduff**	13.52%	5,642	5,689.25	5,693.4	5,722.84	5,725.91	5,725.91	5,725.91	**6,097.91**
SDLP	**Eugene McMenamin**	8.30%	3,465	3,479.07	3,517.15	3,518.15	3,533.24	3,545.24	3,692.99	**5,975.68**
Sinn Féin	Brian McMahon	10.66%	4,450	4,456.99	4,464.05	4,483.95	4,484.98	4,484.98	4,484.98	4,558.69
SDLP	Joe Byrne	6.34%	2,645	2,718.20	2,774.92	2,777.87	2,790.99	2,802.24	2,991.24	
DUP	Derek Reaney	6.10%	2,547	2,549.04	2,774.52	2,774.55				
UUP	Bert Wilson	4.63%	1,934	1,940.12						
PUP	Roy Reid	0.56%	233	233.57						
Alliance	Steven Alexander	0.39%	164	171.47						
Electorate: 57,795 Valid: 41,729 (72.20%) Spoilt: 599 Quota: 5,962 Turnout: 42,328 (73.24%)

==== 1998 ====
1998 Assembly election: West Tyrone – 6 seats
Party	Candidate	FPv%	Count								
Party	Candidate	FPv%	1	2	3	4	5	6	7	8	9
DUP	**Oliver Gibson**	17.44%	**8,015**								
Sinn Féin	**Pat Doherty**	15.29%	**7,027**								
SDLP	**Joe Byrne**	14.13%	6,495	6,498.78	6,512.1	**6,705.1**					
UUP	**Derek Hussey**	10.06%	4,622	5,518.91	5,519.27	5,553.31	5,769.72	5,883.18	5,920.6	**8,445.6**	
SDLP	**Eugene McMenamin**	7.72%	3,548	3,549.26	3,553.7	3,645	3,744	4,011.24	5,623.17	5,791.17	**6,520.17**
Sinn Féin	**Barry McElduff**	10.80%	4,963	4,963.84	5,276.44	5,386.33	5,415.75	5,664.77	5,989.21	5,993.26	**5,997.26**
Sinn Féin	Seamus Devine	8.00%	3,676	3,676	3,747.64	3,806.48	3,836.66	3,937.62	4,072.94	4,078.05	4,088.05
UUP	Alastair Patterson	5.69%	2,615	3,055.16	3,055.16	3,112.58	3,270.1	3,356.81	3,372.02		
SDLP	Pat McDonnell	3.86%	1,772	1,773.89	1,777.55	1,837.27	2,009.57	2,461.99			
Independent	Paddy McGowan	2.76%	1,269	1,301.34	1,304.82	1,447.09	1,718.23				
Alliance	Ann Gormley	2.20%	1,011	1,020.66	1,022.64	1,104.62					
Independent	Johnny McLaughlin	1.24%	570	583.44	586.38						
Independent	Laurence O'Kane	0.37%	171	172.89	174.09						
Workers' Party	Tommy Owens	0.34%	157	161.83	162.19						
Natural Law	Robert Johnstone	0.09%	40	50.71	51.01						
Electorate: 59,081 Valid: 45,951 (77.78%) Spoilt: 962 Quota: 6,565 Turnout: 46,913 (79.40%)

=== 1996 forum ===
Successful candidates are shown in bold.

Party	Candidates	Votes	Percentage
SDLP	**Joe Byrne**; **Paddy McGowan**; Ignatius Murtagh; Seamus Shields	11,622	28.4
Sinn Féin	**Barry McElduff**; Patrick McMahon; Francis Mackey; Patrick Watters; Padraigin Ui Mhurdchadha	11,516	28.1
UUP	**Derek Hussey**; William Oldcroft; Edward Turner; Desmond Anderson; James Emery	7,327	17.9
DUP	**Oliver Gibson**; Thomas Kerrigan	6,727	16.4
Alliance	Ann Gormley; Elizabeth McCaffrey; John Devine	1,081	2.6
Labour coalition	John McLaughlin; Michael Duffy; Anton McCabe; Manus Maguire	792	1.9
Ulster Democratic	Thomas Lowry; Stephen Taylor	397	1.0
UK Unionist	Dennis Wickersham; John McNeil	292	0.7
PUP	Eileen Ward; George McDermott	238	0.6
NI Women's Coalition	Helena Schlindwein; Maria McGilloway; Frances Donaghy	185	0.5
Workers' Party	Hugh Mullan; John Doherty	169	0.4
Green (NI)	Ben Ryan; Carolyn Bell; Donald Spencer	158	0.4
Democratic Left	P. J. McClean; Teresa McVeigh; Mary Veronica McElroy; Martin McCay	130	0.3
NI Conservatives	Lindsay Cumming; Julian Robertson	119	0.3
Ulster Independence	Sandra Jones; Stanley Hayes; Richard Button	107	0.3
Natural Law	John McCallen; Denis Nelson	45	0.1
Independent Chambers	Mandy Beattie; Heather Ewart	30	0.1
