= 2011 Northern Ireland Assembly election =

- 5 May 2011

All 108 seats to the Northern Ireland Assembly
- Turnout: 55.7% (▼6.6%)
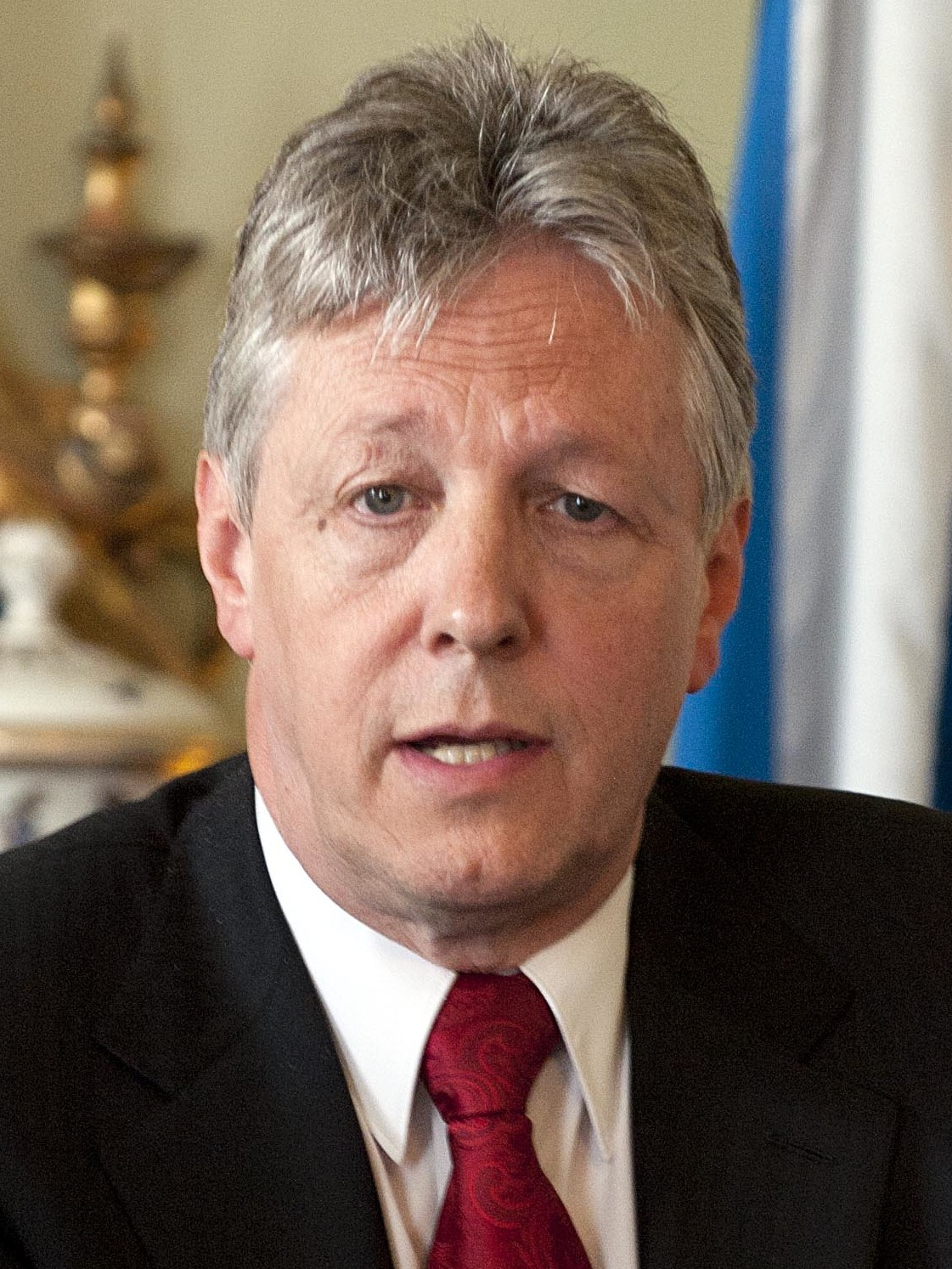

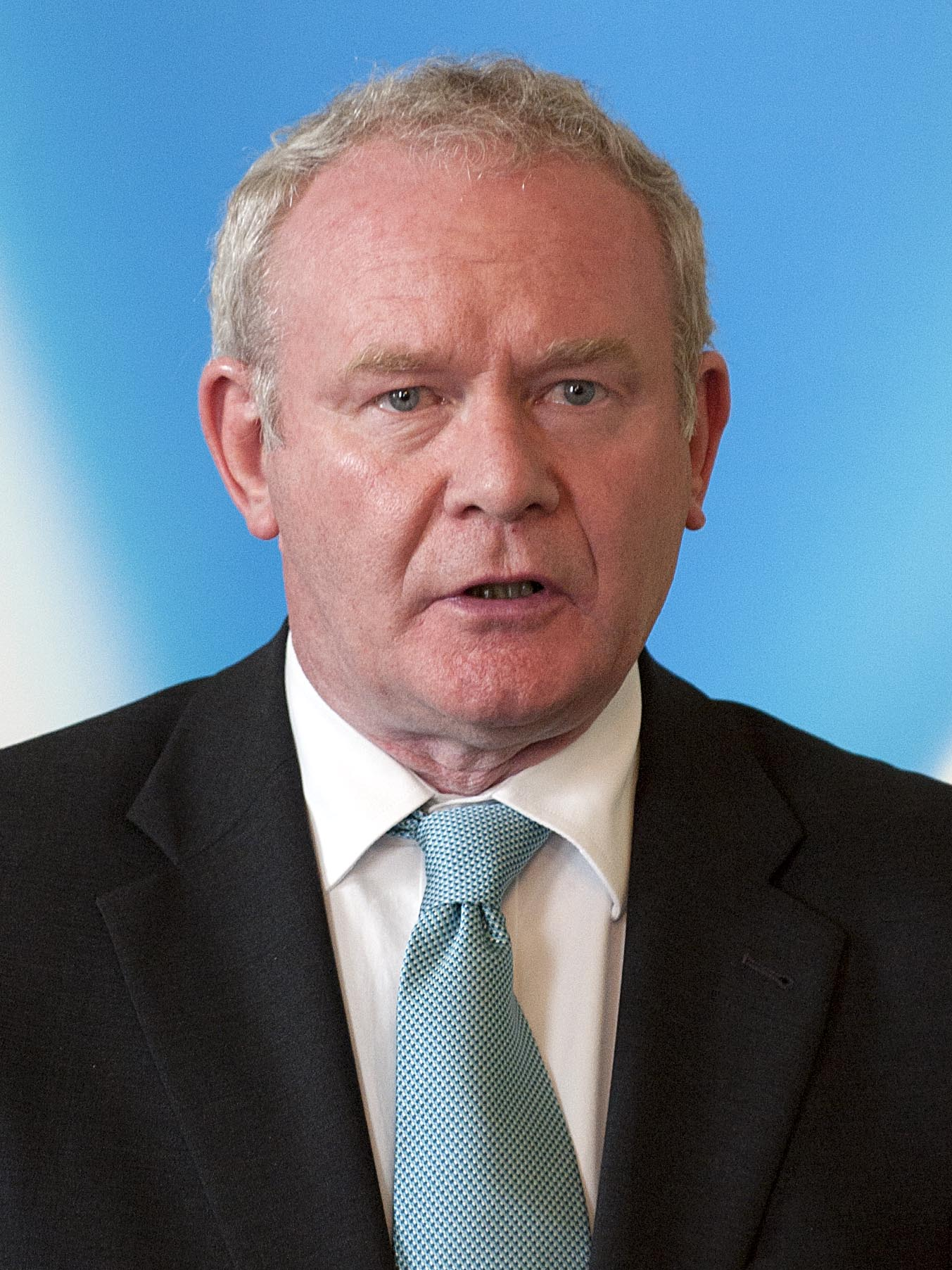

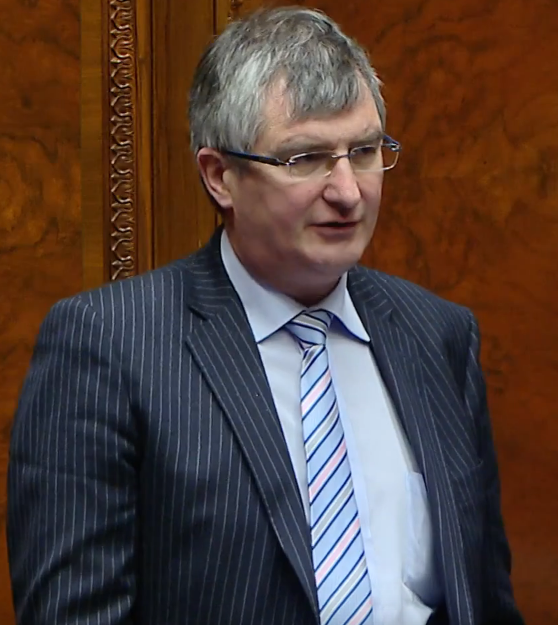

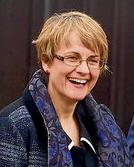

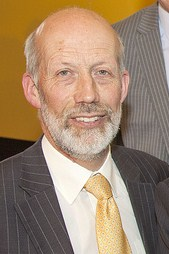

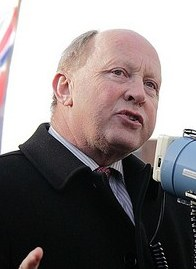

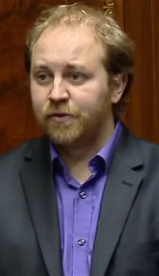
	First party	Second party	Third party
Leader	Peter Robinson	Martin McGuinness (Note: Sinn Féin's president at the time was Gerry Adams; however he already held a seat in the Dáil Éireann. McGuinness was Sinn Féin's "party leader in the North".)	Tom Elliott
Party	DUP	Sinn Féin	UUP
Leader since	31 May 2008	8 May 2007	22 September 2010
Leader's seat	Belfast East	Mid Ulster	Fermanagh and South Tyrone
Last election	36 seats, 30.1%	28 seats, 26.2%	18 seats, 14.9%
Seats before	35	27	16
Seats won	38	29	16
Seat change	▲2	▲1	▼2
Popular vote	198,436	178,224	87,531
Percentage	30.0%	26.9%	13.2%
Swing	▼0.1%	▲0.7%	▼1.7%
	Fourth party	Fifth party	Sixth party
Leader	Margaret Ritchie	David Ford	Jim Allister
Party	SDLP	Alliance	TUV
Leader since	7 February 2010	6 October 2001	7 December 2007
Leader's seat	South Down	South Antrim	North Antrim
Last election	16 seats, 15.2%	7 seats, 5.2%	Not established
Seats before	16	7	0
Seats won	14	8	1
Seat change	▼2	▲1	▲1
Popular vote	94,286	50,875	16,480
Percentage	14.2%	7.7%	2.5%
Swing	▼1.0%	▲2.5%	New party
	Seventh party
Leader	Steven Agnew
Party	Green (NI)
Leader since	10 January 2011
Leader's seat	North Down
Last election	1 seat, 1.7%
Seats before	1
Seats won	1
Seat change	Steady
Popular vote	6,031
Percentage	0.9%
Swing	▼0.8%
- Election results. Voters elect 6 assembly members from the 18 constituencies.
First Minister and
deputy First Minister before election
Peter Robinson (DUP) &
Martin McGuinness (SF)
First Minister and
deputy First Minister
after election
Peter Robinson (DUP) &
Martin McGuinness (SF)

The 2011 Northern Ireland Assembly election took place on Thursday, 5 May, following the dissolution of the Northern Ireland Assembly at midnight on 24 March 2011. It was the fourth election to take place since the devolved assembly was established in 1998.

It was held on the same day as elections for Northern Ireland's 26 local councils, the Scottish Parliament and Welsh Assembly elections, a number of local elections in England and the United Kingdom Alternative Vote referendum. As in the past, the 2011 election to the Assembly was conducted using the single transferable vote (STV) system of proportional representation. The 108 seats were contested in 18 constituencies by 218 candidates, including 15 independents and the nominees of 14 separate political parties.

1,210,009 individuals were registered to vote in the 2011 Assembly election (representing an increase of 9.2% compared to the 2007 Assembly election). Turnout in the 2011 Assembly election was 55.7%, a decline of almost seven percentage points from the previous Assembly election and down over 14 percentage points from the first election to the Assembly in 1998.

As in the 2007 election, the Democratic Unionist Party (DUP) and Sinn Féin (SF) remained the two largest parties in the Assembly, with the DUP winning 38 and Sinn Féin winning 29 of the Assembly's 108 seats. The Ulster Unionist Party (UUP) won 16 seats, the Social Democratic and Labour Party (SDLP) 14 and the Alliance 8, while one seat each was won by the Green Party, Traditional Unionist Voice (TUV) and an independent candidate.

Following the results of the election, Peter Robinson of the DUP and Martin McGuinness of Sinn Féin were nominated and subsequently re-elected as First Minister and deputy First Minister on 12 May 2011. The sole change to the Northern Ireland Executive was that the UUP lost a ministerial post to the Alliance.

== Overview ==
The election was the first since the devolution of policing and justice powers to the assembly. In contrast to previous elections, it was relatively uncontroversial. The turnout was one of the lowest ever in a Northern Ireland election. Sinn Féin and the Democratic Unionist Party both continued to make gains, although the DUP vote share was slightly down. The election was a disaster for the Ulster Unionist Party, which came behind the Social Democratic and Labour Party in terms of first preference vote, although the UUP won more seats. The Ulster Unionist vote collapsed in Belfast, where it was eclipsed by the Alliance Party's, and in a number of other constituencies considered safe such as North Down. The election was also poor for the SDLP, which lost two seats.

The Alliance Party performed well, gaining a second seat in East Belfast (which a former Progressive Unionist Party member lost and the PUP failed to regain), while increasing the Alliance vote share significantly. Traditional Unionist Voice secured a single seat in North Antrim; its vote share was down from the May 2010 elections to the UK Parliament. Despite their first preference vote halving, the Green Party held their sole seat in North Down while the People before Profit Alliance narrowly failed to take the final seat in the Foyle constituency. The only member elected as an independent in 2007 (in West Tyrone) retired, leaving a single independent in the new Assembly (after three independents first elected on other tickets had retired or lost re-election), compared to five at the end of the previous one.

== Results ==
Result by constituencies

As in the previous Assembly, the DUP's voting strength was reduced by one with the re-election on 12 May of Willie Hay (DUP, Foyle) to the non-partisan office of Speaker.

Ten seats on the Northern Ireland Executive were filled by the new Assembly on 16 May according to party strength under the d'Hondt method of proportional representation.

In addition, in separate votes on 12 and 16 May, the Assembly as a whole re-elected party leaders David Ford (Alliance), Peter Robinson (DUP) and Martin McGuinness (Sinn Féin) to their seats on the Executive as, respectively, Minister of Justice and First Minister and deputy First Minister. Thus the Executive's total membership, as in the past, is 13.

Numbers as reported by Wednesday, 11 May 2011.

Party	Votes	%	+/–	Seats			
Party	Votes	%	+/–	Assembly	+/–	Executive	+/–
Democratic Unionist Party	198,436	29.99	-0.1	38	+2	4	–
Sinn Féin	178,222	26.93	+0.7	29	+1	3	–
Social Democratic and Labour Party	94,286	14.25	-1.0	14	-2	1	–
Ulster Unionist Party	87,531	13.23	-1.7	16	-2	1	-1
Alliance Party of Northern Ireland	50,875	7.69	+2.5	8	+1	1	+1
Traditional Unionist Voice	16,480	2.49	New	1	+1	–	–
Green Party in Northern Ireland	6,031	0.91	-0.8	1	–	–	–
People Before Profit Alliance	5,438	0.82	+0.7	–	–	–	–
United Kingdom Independence Party	4,152	0.63	+0.4	–	–	–	–
Progressive Unionist Party	1,493	0.23	-0.4	–	-1	–	–
British National Party	1,252	0.19	New	–	–	–	–
Workers' Party	1,155	0.17	+0.1	–	–	–	–
Socialist Party	819	0.12	+0.1	–	–	–	–
Pro Capitalism	29	0.00	New	–	–	–	–
Independent	15,535	2.35	-0.5	1	–	–	–
Total	661,734	100.00	–	108	0	10	0

== Constituency results ==
=== Distribution of seats by constituency ===
Party affiliation of the six Assembly members returned by each constituency. The first column indicates the party of the Member of the House of Commons (MP) returned by the corresponding parliamentary constituency in the general election of 6 May 2010 (under the "first past the post" method).

(The constituencies are arranged here in rough geographical order around Lough Neagh from Antrim to Londonderry. To see them in alphabetical order, click the small square icon after "Constituency"; to restore this geographical order, click the icon after "No." at the left.)

No.	2010 MP	Constituency	Candi- dates	Total seats	Green	Sinn Féin	SDLP	Alli- ance	UUP	DUP	TUV	Ind.	Seat gained by	Seat lost by
1	DUP	North Antrim	11	6	-	1	-	-	1	3	1	-	TUV	SDLP
2	DUP	East Antrim	13	6	-	1	-	1	1	3	-	-	SF	UUP
3	DUP	South Antrim	10	6	-	1	-	1	1	3	-	-	DUP	SDLP
4	DUP	Belfast North	11	6	-	2	1	-	-	3	-	-	DUP	UUP
5	SF	Belfast West	14	6	-	5	1	-	-	-	-	-	-	-
6	SDLP	Belfast South	14	6	-	1	2	1	1	1	-	-	-	-
7	APNI	Belfast East	17	6	-	-	-	2	1	3	-	-	APNI	PUP
8	Ind.	North Down	13	6	1	-	-	1	1	3	-	-	DUP	UUP
9	DUP	Strangford	11	6	-	-	-	1	2	3	-	-	UUP	DUP
10	DUP	Lagan Valley	11	6	-	-	-	1	1	4	-	-	DUP	SF
11	DUP	Upper Bann	12	6	-	1	1	-	2	2	-	-	-	-
12	SDLP	South Down	11	6	-	2	2	-	1	1	-	-	-	-
13	SF	Newry and Armagh	11	6	-	3	1	-	1	1	-	-	-	-
14	SF	Fermanagh & South Tyrone	11	6	-	3	-	-	1	2	-	-	SF	SDLP
15	SF	West Tyrone	11	6	-	3	1	-	1	1	-	-	SDLP UUP	Ind DUP
16	SF	Mid Ulster	13	6	-	3	1	-	1	1	-	-	-	-
17	SDLP	Foyle	12	6	-	2	3	-	-	1	-	-	-	-
18	DUP	East Londonderry	12	6	-	1	1	-	-	3	-	1	Ind	UUP
18		Total	218	108	1	29	14	8	16	38	1	1		
		Change since dissolution	-	-	-	+2	–2	+1	-	+2	+1	–4		
		Assembly at dissolution	-	108	1	27	16	7	16	36	-	5	-	
		Change during Assembly term	-	-	-	–1	-	-	–2	-	-	+4	–1 Prog. U.	
		Elected on 7 March 2007	256	108	1	28	16	7	18	36	-	1	1 Prog. U.	
		Elected on 23 November 2003		108	-	24	18	6	27	30	-	1	1 Prog. U.	1 UKUP
		Elected on 25 June 1998		108	-	18	24	6	28	20	-	4	2 Prog. U.	5 UKUP, 2 NIWC

- Three of the four independents elected in 1998 ran as Independent Unionists
- NIWC = Northern Ireland Women's Coalition; Prog. U. = Progressive Unionist Party; TUV = Traditional Unionist Voice; UKUP = United Kingdom Unionist Party

=== Share of first-preference votes ===
Percentage of each constituency's first-preference votes. Four highest percentages in each constituency shaded; absolute majorities underlined. The constituencies are arranged in the geographic order described for the table above; click the icon next to "Constituency" to see them in alphabetical order.

- [The totals given here are the sum of all valid ballots cast in each constituency, and the percentages are based on such totals. The turnout percentages in the last column, however, are based upon all ballots cast, which also include anything from twenty to a thousand invalid ballots in each constituency. The total valid ballots' percentage of the eligible electorate can correspondingly differ by 0.1% to 2% from the turnout percentage.]

No.	2015 MP	MP's % of 2015 vote	Constituency	Green	Sinn Féin	SDLP	Alli- ance	UUP	DUP	TUV	Ind.	Others.	Total votes	Eligible elector- ate	Turn- out %
1	DUP	46.4%	North Antrim		15.3	9.1	4.6	11.7	47.6	11.6			40,313	74,760	54.8%
2	DUP	45.9%	East Antrim	2.3	8.2	4.6	15.5	16.9	46.2	4.6	1.8		29,023	61,617	47.8%
3	DUP	33.9%	South Antrim		14.5	10.6	14.2	17.8	38.3	3.4	1.3		32,164	65,231	50.1%
4	DUP	40.0%	Belfast North		31.9	12.0	6.3	8.2	37.1		1.0	3.5	33,470	68,119	50.3%
5	SF	71.1%	Belfast West		66.1	13.2	1.1	4.2	7.5		7.6	0.4	34,647	61,520	57.9%
6	SDLP	41.0%	Belfast South	2.8	12.5	23.9	19.8	13.6	24.3		3.2		32,308	62,484	52.4%
7	All.	37.2%	Belfast East	1.8	3.2	0.8	26.3	9.7	44.1	2.2	6.6	5.4	32,347	61,263	53.6%
8	Ind.	63.3%	North Down	7.9	1.0	2.7	18.6	10.4	44.2		2.2	13.0	28,098	62,170	45.9%
9	DUP	45.9%	Strangford		3.0	8.5	14.4	20.4	48.8	2.8	2.0		29,668	62,178	48.5%
10	DUP	49.8%	Lagan Valley	1.7	3.4	6.1	12.4	20.4	53.1	2.9			35,487	67,532	53.1%
11	DUP	33.8%	Upper Bann		27.2	11.4	6.5	24.6	27.1	2.4	0.6		42,362	77,905	55.3%
12	SDLP	48.5%	South Down	2.7	30.9	35.8	2.1	10.6	12.5		5.6		41,726	73,240	58.1%
13	SF	42.0%	Newry & Armagh		40.8	23.5	1.6	18.7	13.1	1.8	0.2	0.2	46,514	77,544	61.3%
14	SF	45.5%	Fermanagh & S. Tyrone		40.3	9.6	1.8	19.3	24.4	2.6		2.1	47,999	70,985	69.0%
15	SF	48.4%	West Tyrone		50.2	8.6	2.2	10.3	23.1			5.7	39,303	62,970	64.0%
16	SF	52.0%	Mid Ulster		49.2	14.7	0.9	10.3	16.7	4.9	0.6	2.7	42,738	66,602	65.3%
17	SDLP	44.7%	Foyle		34.0	35.3	0.9		18.4		8.0	3.4	38,847	68,663	56.6%
18	DUP	34.6%	East Londonderry		21.1	14.9	5.5	8.4	36.9	4.5		8.6	34,722	65,226	54.1%
18			Northern Ireland	0.9	26.9	14.2	7.7	13.2	30.0	2.5	2.2	2.3	661,736	1,210,009	55.6%
			Change since 2007	–0.8	+0.8	–1.0	+2.5	–1.7	–0.1	+2.5	–1.6	–0.5	–28,577	+102,105	–7.2%
			Election of March 2007	1.7	26.2	15.2	5.2	14.9	30.1	—	3.8	2.8	690,313	1,107,904	62.9%
			Election of Nov. 2003	0.4	23.5	17.0	3.7	22.7	25.7	—	5.6	2.8	692,026	1,097,526	63.1%
			Election of June 1998	0.1	17.6	22.0	6.5	21.3	18.1	—	10.9	3.5	823,565	1,178,556	69.9%

- Independent Unionist vote in 1998 (2.8%) included in the Independent column (not "others"). TUV = Traditional Unionist Voice.

==== Votes cast for minor parties and independents ====
Out of the 22 candidates from the seven parties which won no seats in 2011, the four candidates who won more than 1,000 first-preference votes (and more than 4% of the total first preferences) in their respective constituencies were:

1. Eamonn McCann of the People Before Profit Alliance in Foyle: 3,120 (8.0%),
2. Henry Reilly of the UK Independence Party in South Down: 2,332 (5.6%),
3. Gerry Carroll of People Before Profit in Belfast West: 1,661 (4.8%), and
4. Brian Ervine of the Progressive Unionist Party in Belfast East: 1,493 (4.6%)

Three-fifths, or 8,606 (60%), of the 14,338 first preferences cast for the seven minor parties went to these four candidates.

Of the 15 independent candidates, running in 9 separate constituencies, the 8 who won more than 1,000 first-preference votes (and over 2.5% of the first-preference total) were:

1. David McClarty, MLA, formerly Ulster Unionist, re-elected in East Londonderry: 3,003 (8.6%),
2. Alan McFarland, MLA, formerly Ulster Unionist, defeated in North Down: 1,879 (6.7%),
3. Alan Chambers, also losing in North Down: 1,765 (6.3%),
4. Dawn Purvis, MLA, formerly Progressive Unionist, defeated in Belfast East (see above): 1,702 (5.3%),
5. Paul McFadden in Foyle: 1,280 (3.3%),
6. Raymond McCord in Belfast North: 1,176 (3.5%),
7. Paddy McGowan in West Tyrone: 1,145 (2.9%), and
8. Eugene McMenamin, also in West Tyrone: 1,096 (2.8%)

A majority (8,395 or 54%) of the 15,535 first-preference votes cast for independents went to the first four of these candidates, three of whom had been elected by other parties in 2007. David McClarty was the only successful independent candidate.

=== Seats changing hands ===
- The Alliance gained a seat in Belfast East (from Dawn Purvis, an independent elected as a Progressive Unionist). Net gain +1.
- The Democratic Unionist Party gained seats from the UUP in Belfast North and North Down, but lost one to the UUP in Strangford. The DUP also gained seats in the Lagan Valley (from SF) and South Antrim (from SDLP), but lost a seat in West Tyrone (to UUP or SDLP). Net gain +2.
- An independent elected in 2007 from West Tyrone did not run again in 2011 (seat won by SDLP or DUP). An Ulster Unionist elected in 2007 from East Londonderry, who was not re-nominated by his party, won election in 2011 as an independent. (After his re-election, he decided to remain an independent outside the UUP.) Three other independents elected in 2007 by different parties were not returned in 2011: a former Ulster Unionist in North Down (to DUP), a former Progressive Unionist in Belfast East (to Alliance), and a former Sinn Féin member in Fermanagh & South Tyrone (regained by SF). No net change from 2007; net change from the outgoing Assembly: –4.
- The Progressive Unionist Party elected a single member in 2007 from East Belfast who resigned from the party in 2010 (and whose seat was gained by the Alliance in 2011). The PUP failed to elect its only candidate in 2011. Net change from 2007 –1; no net change from the outgoing Assembly.
- Sinn Féin gained seats in East Antrim (from UUP) and Fermanagh & South Tyrone (from SDLP), but lost one in the Lagan Valley (to DUP). It also regained a second seat in Fermanagh & South Tyrone that had been held by an independent originally elected as Sinn Féin. Net gain +2 from the outgoing Assembly and +1 from 2007.
- The Social Democratic & Labour Party gained a seat from West Tyrone (from Ind. or DUP) but lost seats in Fermanagh & South Tyrone (to SF), North Antrim (to Traditional Unionist Voice) and South Antrim (to DUP). Net loss –2.
- Traditional Unionist Voice won its first and only seat, in North Antrim (from the SDLP). Net gain +1.
- The Ulster Unionist Party gained seats in Strangford (from DUP) and West Tyrone (from DUP or Ind.), but lost seats in Belfast North (to DUP) and East Antrim (to SF). Another two members elected as Ulster Unionists in North Down and East Londonderry left the UUP before the 2011 election. Net loss from 2007: –2. (No net change from the outgoing Assembly.)

== Turnover in members since 2007 ==
Thirty-one members of the previous Assembly during all of part of its term (2007–2011) did not offer themselves for re-election in May 2011. Another eight who did seek re-election were unsuccessful.

=== Members who left during the previous Assembly's term ===
Several of the 14 members who retired early from the Northern Ireland Assembly did so either after being elected or re-elected to the British House of Commons on 6 May 2010 (as MPs), or else in anticipation of being elected to the Dáil Éireann (lower house of the Irish parliament) on 25 February 2011 (as a TD). [Three retired or retiring members are Privy Counsellors of the United Kingdom (PC).]

Name	Title in 2011	Party	Assembly constituency	Left Assembly	Successor	Successor returned?
George Dawson	[deceased]	DUP	East Antrim	7 May 2007	Alastair Ian Ross	yes
David Burnside		UUP	South Antrim	1 June 2009	Danny Kinahan	yes
Francie Brolly		Sinn Féin	East Londonderry	11 December 2009	Billy Leonard	did not run (SF hold)
Iris Robinson		DUP	Strangford	12 January 2010	Jonathan Bell	yes
Carmel Hanna		SDLP	Belfast South	15 January 2010	Conall McDevitt	yes
Jeffrey Donaldson	MP, PC	DUP	Lagan Valley	10 June 2010	Paul Givan	yes
Ian Paisley Jr	MP	DUP	North Antrim	21 June 2010	Paul Frew	yes
David Simpson	MP	DUP	Upper Bann	1 July 2010	Sidney Anderson	yes
William McCrea	MP	DUP	South Antrim	1 July 2010	Paul Girvan	yes
Naomi Long	MP	Alliance	Belfast East	5 July 2010	Chris Lyttle	yes
Jim Shannon	MP	DUP	Strangford	1 August 2010	Simpson Gibson	did not run (UUP gain)
Nigel Dodds	MP, PC	DUP	Belfast North	10 September 2010	William Humphrey	yes
Mark Durkan	MP	SDLP	Foyle	9 November 2010	Pól Callaghan	not elected (SDLP hold)
Gerry Adams	TD	Sinn Féin	Belfast West	7 December 2010	Pat Sheehan	yes

=== Changes in membership at the election ===
These are the 25 changes in membership that occurred between the third Assembly's dissolution in March 2011 and the fourth Assembly's election in May. Seventeen sitting members did not present themselves for re-election and another eight were defeated at the polls. One re-elected member had been elected with a different affiliation in 2007.

The numbers indicate the percentage of votes each member received in the first round of counting under the Single Transferable Vote in the 2011 election, and the round which decided his or her election or defeat.

In some constituencies (Foyle, West Tyrone and Fermanagh & South Tyrone), it is not possible to couple a single outgoing member by party with a single successor. The pairs of outgoing and incoming members in those seats are presented in arbitrary order.

==== Changes in membership without a change in party ====
Most of these changes occurred due to a member's retirement, although one defeated member of the SDLP, in Foyle, was succeeded by another member of the SDLP.

Outgoing member(s)	Party	1st pref.	Round	Constituency	New member(s)	Party	1st pref.	Round
Billy Armstrong (retiring)	Ulster Unionist	—	—	Mid Ulster	Sandra Overend	UUP	10.3%	6
P. J. Bradley (retiring)	SDLP	—	—	South Down	Karen McKevitt	SDLP	9.0%	9
Pól Callaghan [replaced Mark Durkan, MP] Mary Bradley (retiring)	SDLP	6.8% —	4 —	Foyle	Mark H. Durkan; Colum Eastwood	SDLP	12.8% 7.6%	4; 7
Wallace Browne (retiring); Baron Browne of Belmont	Democratic Unionist	—	—	Belfast East	Sammy Douglas	DUP	8.3%	11
Robert Coulter (retiring)	Ulster Unionist	—	—	North Antrim	Robin Swann	UUP	6.2%	9
Reg Empey (retiring); Lord Empey	Ulster Unionist	—	—	Belfast East	Michael Copeland	UUP	6.8%	11
Billy Leonard (retiring) [replaced Francie Brolly]	Sinn Féin (suspended)	—	—	East Londonderry	Cathal Ó hOisín	Sinn Féin	13.5%	6
Claire McGill (retiring)	Sinn Féin	—	—	West Tyrone	Michaela Boyle	Sinn Féin	12.9%	4
Seán Neeson (retiring)	Alliance	—	—	East Antrim	Stewart Dickson	Alliance	10.0%	9
Ian Paisley, PC (retiring); Lord Bannside	Democratic Unionist	—	—	North Antrim	David McIlveen	DUP	8.1%	8
George Savage (retiring)	Ulster Unionist	—	—	Upper Bann	Jo-Anne Dobson	UUP	7.9%	7
Brian Wilson (retiring)	Green Party in Northern Ireland	—	—	North Down	Steven Agnew	Green	7.9%	11

==== Seats changing hands between the parties ====
Note that the party changes in Lagan Valley, Strangford and East Antrim cancelled each other out.

Outgoing member(s)	Party	1st pref	Round	Constituency	New member(s)	Party	1st pref	Round
Allan Bresland; Kieran Deeny (retiring)	Democratic Unionist; Independent	10.3% —	0 —	West Tyrone	Ross Hussey; Joe Byrne	UUP; SDLP	10.4% 8.5%	5
Thomas Burns	SDLP	10.6%	0	South Antrim	Pam Lewis	DUP	8.9%	4
Fred Cobain	Ulster Unionist	8.2%	7	Belfast North	Paula Bradley	DUP	10.4%	6
Tommy Gallagher; Gerry McHugh (retiring)	SDLP; Ind. (elected as SF)	9.6% —	6 —	Fermanagh & South Tyrone	Seán Lynch; Phil Flanagan	Sinn Féin	10.7% 10.6%	6
David McClarty	Ind. (elected as UUP)	8.6%	7	East Londonderry	David McClarty	Independent	8.6%	7
Alan McFarland	Ind. (elected as UUP)	6.7%	9	North Down	Gordon Dunne	DUP	13.3%	2
Declan O'Loan	SDLP	9.1%	9	North Antrim	Jim Allister	Trad. U. Voice	10.1%	9
Dawn Purvis	Ind. (elected as Prog. U.)	5.3%	11	Belfast East	Judith Cochrane	Alliance	13.4%	7
Paul Butler (retiring)	Sinn Féin	—	—	Lagan Valley	Brenda Hale	DUP	8.2%	7
Simpson Gibson (retiring) [replaced Jim Shannon]	Democratic Unionist	—	—	Strangford	Mike Nesbitt	UUP	11.0%	6
Ken Robinson (retiring)	Ulster Unionist	—	—	East Antrim	Oliver McMullan	Sinn Féin	8.2%	10

==== Member returning with a different affiliation ====
David McClarty, originally elected from East Londonderry as an Ulster Unionist, although not re-nominated by the UUP in 2011, stood successfully for re-election as an independent. This reduced the UUP's strength from 2007, while keeping independent strength in the Assembly at one (as Kieran Deeny, the retiring independent member, was not succeeded in West Tyrone by another independent). McClarty decided not to re-join the UUP after his re-election.

== Speaker ==
The presiding officer of the Northern Ireland's Assembly (like those for Scotland and Wales, but unlike those for the United Kingdom or the Republic of Ireland) does not remain impartial during the election period. The sitting Speaker, in this instance William Hay (DUP, Foyle), must revert to his or her party colours and campaign for a seat on its manifesto. Once re-elected as an MLA (as Hay was), he or she becomes eligible for re-election as Speaker to resume unbiased authority over the Assembly. The regional media reported that Sinn Féin's Francie Molloy, an outgoing Deputy Speaker, had hoped to win election as Speaker when the 2011 Assembly first met; in the event, following inter-party negotiations, Hay was re-elected and Molloy was nominated by his party for, and elected to, a newly created position of Principal Deputy Speaker with a presumed right of succession.

== Party leaders in the Assembly ==
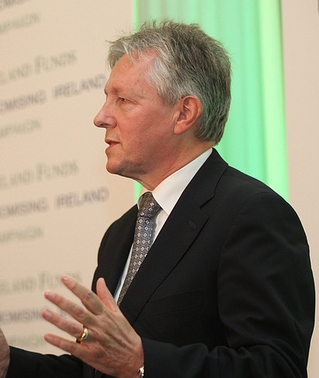
Peter Robinson, DUP,
First Minister

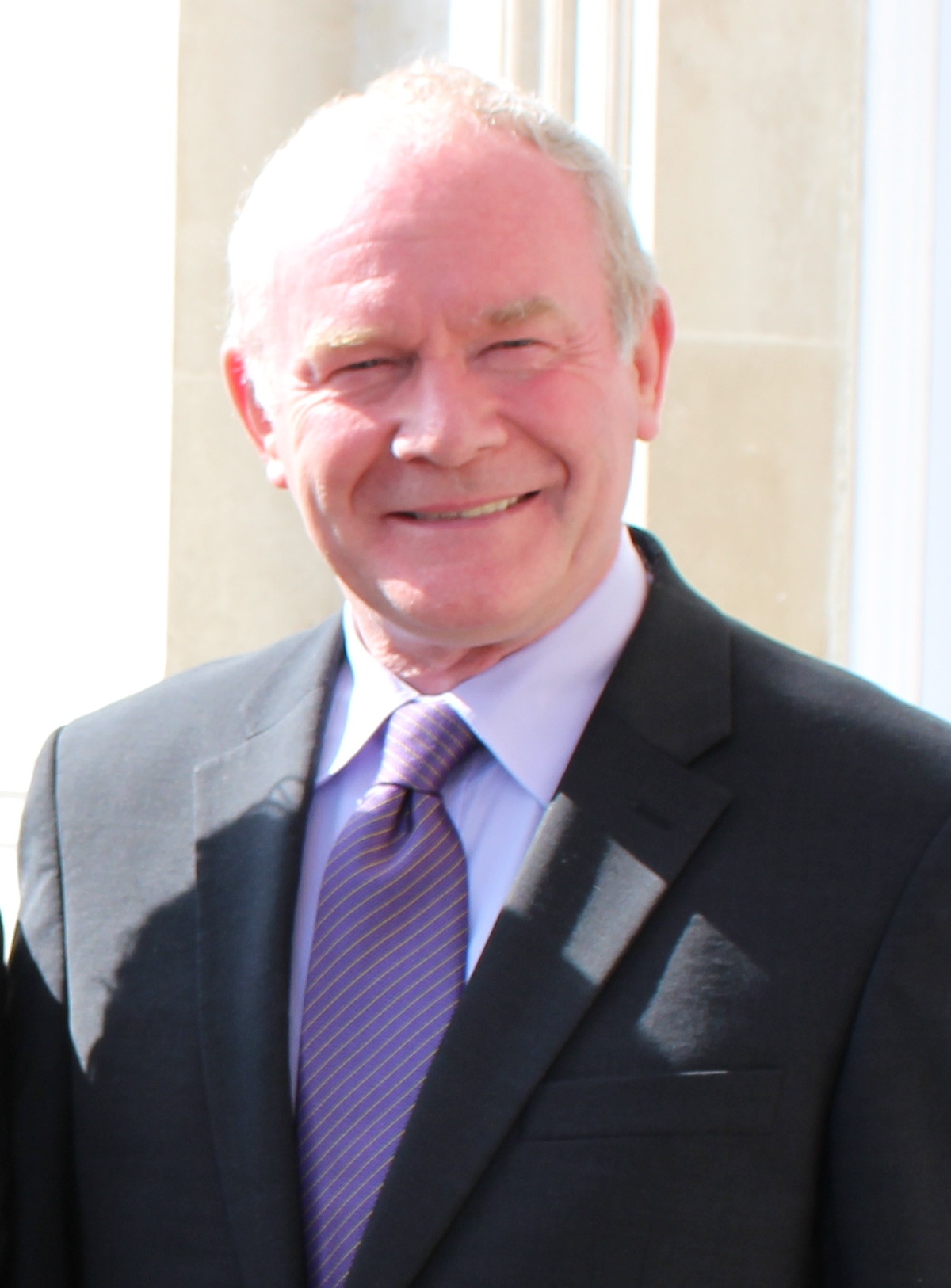
Martin McGuinness, Sinn Féin,
deputy First Minister

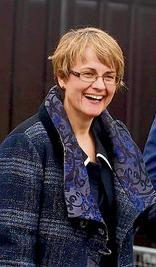
Margaret Ritchie,
Social Democratic & Labour Party

== Electoral administration ==
=== Eligibility and proof of identity ===
European Union (EU) and Commonwealth citizens aged 18 or over on election day were entitled to vote. The deadline for voters to register to vote in 5 May elections was midnight on 14 April 2011. All voters had to present one piece of photographic identification in order to cast a vote at the polling station: accepted forms of ID were an Electoral Identity Card, a photographic Northern Ireland or Great Britain driving licence, a European Union member state passport, a Translink 60+ SmartPass, a Translink Senior SmartPass, a Translink Blind Person's SmartPass or a Translink War Disabled SmartPass. Voters who didn't have an accepted type of photographic ID had until 22 April 2011 to apply for an Electoral Identity Card from the Electoral Office. A judicial review brought by candidates in the simultaneous local government elections, challenging the non-acceptance of EU national identity cards as a proof of identity, failed on 4 May 2011.

=== Speed of counting of votes ===
In the days following the 2011 Assembly election concerns were raised by politicians and others about the time it took for ballots to be verified and counted. The first result came in at 7:00 p.m. on Friday 6 May, nine hours after counting began and 21 hours after polls closed. The announcement of the final results for some constituencies came two days after the polls closed. In contrast, the first result for elections held in Scotland on the same day as the Assembly election came in at 12:54 a.m., just under three hours after counting began, and the final result came in at 5:21 p.m. on the same day (Friday 6 May). In response to the criticisms about the speed of counting, Northern Ireland's Chief Electoral Officer, Graham Shields, defended the process, saying that it was "about accuracy, not about speed", adding that "This is a complicated process and people have to accept that. We will take as long as it takes to get it right."

== See also ==
- Candidates nominated to run for the 2011 election of the Northern Ireland Assembly
- 4th Northern Ireland Assembly
- 2011 Irish general election
- 2011 Northern Ireland local elections
- 2011 National Assembly for Wales election
- 2011 Scottish Parliament general election
- 2011 United Kingdom Alternative Vote referendum

== Footnotes ==
Campaign or party web site	Manifesto	1st broadcast	2nd broadcast	3rd broadcast
BBC News		List of all election addresses in the order they were broadcast		
Alliance Party	Manifesto	Wednesday 13 April	Tuesday 26 April	
British National Party	Manifesto	Monday 11 April		
Democratic Unionist Party	Manifesto	Monday 4 April	Tuesday 19 April	Tuesday 3 May
Green Party	Manifesto	Wednesday 20 April		
People Before Profit Alliance		Tuesday 19 April		
Progressive Unionist Party	Manifesto			
Sinn Féin	Manifesto	Tuesday 5 April	Monday 18 April	Monday 2 May
Social Dem. & Labour Party	Manifesto	Wednesday 6 April	Friday 15 April	Thursday 28 April
Socialist Party	[Belfast:] E S W	Monday 18 April		
Traditional Unionist Voice	Manifesto	Wednesday 20 April		
Ulster Unionist Party	Manifesto	Thursday 7 April	Thursday 14 April	Wednesday 27 April
UK Independence Party	Manifesto	Friday 8 April		
Workers' Party	Man. Summary	Wednesday 20 April		
