= West Tyrone (UK Parliament constituency) =

UK Parliament constituency (since 1997)

Coordinates: 54.522°N 7.500°W

- County constituency for the House of Commons
- Boundary of West Tyrone in Northern Ireland
- Major settlements: Omagh, Strabane

Current constituency
- Created: 1997
- Member of Parliament: Órfhlaith Begley (Sinn Féin)
- Created from: Mid Ulster, Foyle

West Tyrone is a parliamentary constituency in the House of Commons of the United Kingdom. The current MP is Órfhlaith Begley, a member of Sinn Féin, who has represented the constituency since the 2018 by-election.

== Constituency profile ==
The seat is rural and includes the towns of Strabane and Omagh.

== Boundaries ==
Map of current boundaries

Since the constituency's creation in 1997, it has consisted of the territory of the former Districts of Omagh and Strabane. There were major local government boundary changes in 2015, but the constituency boundaries remained unchanged.

The seat was created in a boundary review conducted in 1995 and was predominantly made out of the western half of the old Mid Ulster constituency – indeed it contains more of the old Mid Ulster than the current seat of that name. It also contains parts of the old Foyle constituency.

- Artigarvan; Ballycolman; Castlederg; Dunnamanagh; Finn; Glenderg; Glenelly Valley; Newtownstewart; Sion Mills; Slievekirk; Strabane North; Strabane West from Derry City and Strabane District Council
- Beragh; Camowen; Coolnagard; Dergmoney; Dromore; Drumnakilly; Drumquin; Fairy Water; Fintona; Gortin; Gortrush; Killyclogher; Newtownsaville; Owenkillew; Sixmilecross; Strule; Termon; Trillick from Fermanagh and Omagh District Council
- Pomeroy from Mid Ulster District Council

== History ==
For the history of the equivalent seat prior to 1997, see Mid Ulster.

The seat is overwhelmingly nationalist, with nationalist parties winning over 50% of the vote since the seat was created. However, the nationalist vote has traditionally been split between the Social Democratic and Labour Party (SDLP) and Sinn Féin, whilst the unionist parties have been more willing to make pacts to increase their chances of victory.

When the seat was created it was nominally held by the Democratic Unionist Party (DUP), based on mapping the 1992 general election results onto the new boundaries, but this was because the Ulster Unionist Party (UUP) had not contested the equivalent area. In the 1996 Forum elections the UUP outpolled the DUP and it was agreed that the DUP would not contest the seat. As a result, William Thompson of the UUP won in 1997 with a narrow majority over the SDLP, with Sinn Féin coming third on a large vote.

During the Parliament that followed, the Omagh bombing took place in the constituency, killing 29 people.

In the 2001 general election the SDLP and Sinn Féin both targeted the constituency heavily, in the hope that a shift in the vote from one nationalist party to the other would enable them to outpoll the Ulster Unionists. In the event Sinn Féin's Pat Doherty won.

In 1998 both Sinn Féin and the SDLP won two seats in the Northern Ireland Assembly, with the UUP and DUP winning one each. However, there was much speculation that an increase in Sinn Féin's vote at the SDLP's expense would result in Sinn Féin taking a seat from its nationalist rival at the next assembly election. However, the election was complicated by the intervention of the independent candidate Dr. Kieran Deeny, campaigning on the sole issue of the retention of the hospital in Omagh. In a result that shocked commentators he took one of the SDLP's assembly seats.

Deeny stood again in the 2005 general election and asked most parties to withdraw to support him. Many local activists and voters appeared to agree with this, with some making their support public, but in the end the UUP, DUP and SDLP all fielded candidates. Doherty held the seat for Sinn Féin, but with Deeny polling strongly in second place.

== Members of Parliament ==
West Tyrone's first MP upon its 1997 creation was William Thompson of the Ulster Unionist Party. He was defeated in 2001 by Pat Doherty of Sinn Féin, who held the seat until his retirement at the 2017 general election. He was succeeded by Barry McElduff, also of Sinn Féin, who was MP for just over half a year before he announced his resignation on 15 January 2018, following widespread backlash against a video he posted on Twitter that appeared to mock victims of the Kingsmill massacre. This triggered a by-election won by Sinn Féin's Órfhlaith Begley, who has remained the MP for West Tyrone to the present day.

Election	Member	Party
1997	William Thompson	Ulster Unionist
2001	Pat Doherty	Sinn Féin
2017	Barry McElduff	Sinn Féin
2018	Barry McElduff	Independent
2018 by-election	Órfhlaith Begley	Sinn Féin

== Elections ==
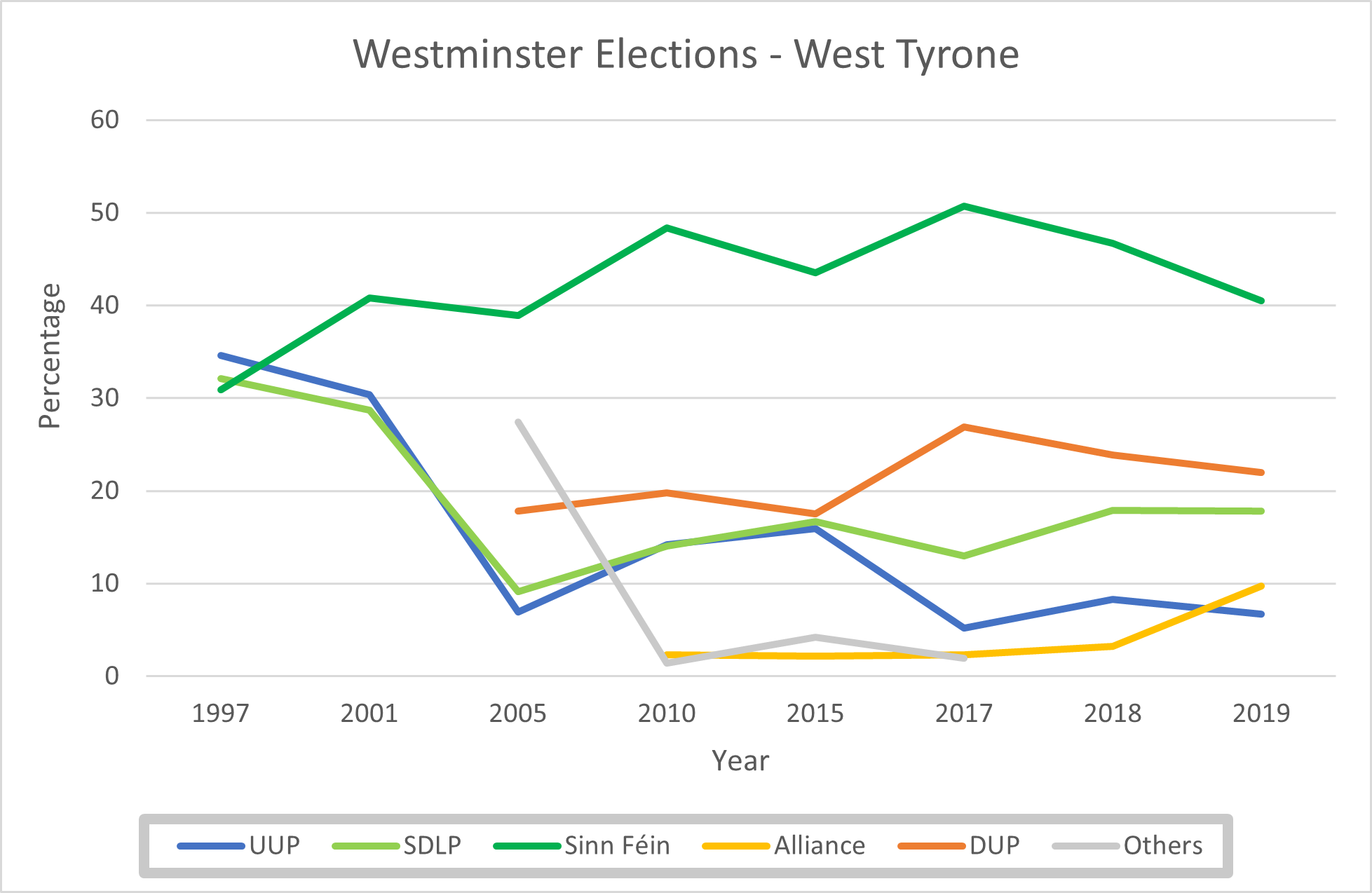
West Tyrone – Results 1997–2019

=== Elections in the 2020s ===
2024 general election: West Tyrone
Party	Candidate	Votes	%	±%
Sinn Féin	Órfhlaith Begley	22,711	52.0	+11.9
DUP	Tom Buchanan	6,794	15.5	−6.2
SDLP	Daniel McCrossan	5,821	13.3	−5.2
UUP	Matthew Bell	2,683	6.1	−0.5
TUV	Stevan Patterson	2,530	5.8	New
Alliance	Stephen Donnelly	2,287	5.2	−4.4
Aontú	Leza Houston	778	1.8	−0.5
NI Conservatives	Stephen Lynch	91	0.2	New
Majority		15,917	36.5	+18.3
Turnout		43,695	58.8	−3.4
Registered electors		74,269		
Sinn Féin hold		Swing	+9.1	

=== Elections in the 2010s ===
2019 general election: West Tyrone
Party	Candidate	Votes	%	±%
Sinn Féin	Órfhlaith Begley	16,544	40.2	−10.5
DUP	Thomas Buchanan	9,066	22.0	−4.9
SDLP	Daniel McCrossan	7,330	17.8	+4.8
Alliance	Stephen Donnelly	3,979	9.7	+7.4
UUP	Andy McKane	2,774	6.7	+1.5
Aontú	James Hope	972	2.4	New
Green (NI)	Susan Glass	521	1.3	+0.3
Majority		7,478	18.2	−4.6
Turnout		41,186	62.2	−6.0
Registered electors		66,215		
Sinn Féin hold		Swing	-2.9	

2018 West Tyrone by-election
Party	Candidate	Votes	%	±%
Sinn Féin	Órfhlaith Begley	16,346	46.7	−4.0
DUP	Thomas Buchanan	8,390	23.9	−3.0
SDLP	Daniel McCrossan	6,254	17.9	+4.9
UUP	Chris Smyth	2,909	8.3	+3.1
Alliance	Stephen Donnelly	1,130	3.2	+0.9
Majority		7,956	22.8	−1.0
Turnout		35,337	55.1	−13.1
Registered electors		64,101		
Sinn Féin hold		Swing	-0.5	

2017 general election: West Tyrone
Party	Candidate	Votes	%	±%
Sinn Féin	Barry McElduff	22,060	50.7	+7.2
DUP	Thomas Buchanan	11,718	26.9	+9.4
SDLP	Daniel McCrossan	5,635	13.0	−3.7
UUP	Alicia Clarke	2,253	5.2	−10.7
Alliance	Stephen Donnelly	1,000	2.3	+0.1
Green (NI)	Ciaran McClean	427	1.0	−1.0
Citizens Independent Social Thought Alliance	Barry Brown	393	0.9	−0.5
Majority		10,342	23.8	−2.2
Turnout		43,675	68.2	+7.7
Registered electors		64,009		
Sinn Féin hold		Swing	-1.1	

2015 general election: West Tyrone
Party	Candidate	Votes	%	±%
Sinn Féin	Pat Doherty	16,807	43.5	−4.9
DUP	Thomas Buchanan	6,747	17.5	−2.3
SDLP	Daniel McCrossan	6,444	16.7	+2.7
UUP	Ross Hussey	6,144	15.9	+1.7
Alliance	Stephen Donnelly	869	2.2	−0.1
Green (NI)	Ciaran McClean	780	2.0	New
CISTA	Barry Brown	528	1.4	New
NI Conservatives	Claire-Louise Leyland	169	0.4	New
Independent	Susan-Anne White	166	0.4	New
Majority		10,060	26.0	−2.6
Turnout		38,654	60.5	−0.5
Registered electors		63,856		
Sinn Féin hold		Swing	-1.3	

2010 general election: West Tyrone
Party	Candidate	Votes	%	±%
Sinn Féin	Pat Doherty	18,050	48.4	+9.5
DUP	Tom Buchanan	7,365	19.8	+2.0
UCU-NF	Ross Hussey	5,281	14.2	+7.3
SDLP	Joe Byrne	5,212	14.0	+4.9
Alliance	Michael Bower	859	2.3	New
Independent	Ciaran McClean	508	1.4	N/A
Majority		10,685	28.6	+17.1
Turnout		37,275	61.0	−11.1
Registered electors		61,148		
Sinn Féin hold		Swing	+3.8	

=== Elections in the 2000s ===
2005 general election: West Tyrone
Party	Candidate	Votes	%	±%
Sinn Féin	Pat Doherty	16,910	38.9	―1.9
Independent	Kieran Deeny	11,905	27.4	New
DUP	Tom Buchanan	7,742	17.8	New
SDLP	Eugene McMenamin	3,949	9.1	―19.6
UUP	Derek Hussey	2,981	6.9	―23.5
Majority		5,005	11.5	+1.1
Turnout		43,487	72.1	―7.8
Registered electors		59,842		
Sinn Féin hold		Swing	―14.6	

2001 general election: West Tyrone
Party	Candidate	Votes	%	±%
Sinn Féin	Pat Doherty	19,814	40.8	+9.9
UUP	William John Thompson	14,774	30.4	―4.2
SDLP	Bríd Rodgers	13,942	28.7	―3.4
Majority		5,040	10.4	N/A
Turnout		48,530	79.9	+0.7
Registered electors		60,739		
Sinn Féin gain from UUP		Swing	―7.1	

=== Elections in the 1990s ===
1997 general election: West Tyrone
Party	Candidate	Votes	%	±%
UUP	William John Thompson	16,003	34.6	
SDLP	Joe Byrne	14,842	32.1	
Sinn Féin	Pat Doherty	14,280	30.9	
Alliance	Ann Gormley	829	1.8	
Workers' Party	Thomas Anthony Owens	230	0.5	
Natural Law	Robert Andrew Johnstone	91	0.2	
Majority		1,161	2.5	
Turnout		46,275	79.2	
Registered electors		58,428		
UUP win (new seat)				

== See also ==
- List of parliamentary constituencies in Northern Ireland
