= Derek Hussey =

British politician (born 1948)

Leader of the Ulster Unionist Party on Derry City and Strabane District Council
- In office 22 May 2014 – 2 May 2019
- Leader: Mike Nesbitt; Robin Swann
- Preceded by: Office created
- Succeeded by: Darren Guy

Member of Derry City and Strabane District Council
- Incumbent
- Assumed office 20 November 2020
- Preceded by: Andy McKane
- Constituency: Derg
- In office 22 May 2014 – 13 August 2019
- Preceded by: New council
- Succeeded by: Andy McKane
- Constituency: Derg

Member of Strabane District Council
- In office 17 May 1989 – 22 May 2014
- Preceded by: David Baird
- Succeeded by: Council abolished
- Constituency: Derg

Member of the Northern Ireland Assembly for West Tyrone
- In office 25 June 1998 – 7 March 2007
- Preceded by: New Creation
- Succeeded by: Allan Bresland

Member of the Northern Ireland Forum for West Tyrone
- In office 30 May 1996 – 25 April 1998
- Preceded by: Forum created
- Succeeded by: Forum dissolved

Personal details
- Born: 12 September 1948 (age 78) Padstow, Cornwall, England
- Party: Ulster Unionist Party (since 1997)
- Other political affiliations: Independent Unionist (1989-1997)
- Spouse: Karen Hussey
- Children: Robert, Craig and Rachel
- Education: Omagh Academy
- Occupation: school teacher
- Profession: teaching
- Website: http://www.uup.org/

Derek Robert Hussey (born 12 September 1948) is an Ulster Unionist Party (UUP) politician, serving as a Derry and Strabane Councillor for the Derg DEA since 2020, having previously served between 2014 and 2019. Hussey was a Member of the Northern Ireland Assembly (MLA) for West Tyrone from 1998 to 2007.

== Background ==
Hussey was educated at Omagh Model School, Omagh Academy and Stranmillis College, Belfast. He was previously a teacher at Castlederg High School.

He was elected to Strabane District Council in 1989 for the Derg District. In 2007, he was elected Chairman of the council. In the 1996 election to the Northern Ireland Peace Forum, Hussey was elected as representative for West Tyrone.

In 1998, he was elected as MLA to the Northern Ireland Assembly, and re-elected in 2003. He was a member of a country and western music band and was known to wear cowboy boots in the 1998–2003 Assembly. He was an outgoing candidate in the 2007 Assembly elections, but lost his seat. His brother, Ross Hussey, re-took the UUP seat in 2011.

He also has a special interest in regional development, Ulster-Scots and the Orange Order. Hussey continued his role in local politics, and was re-elected as the only UUP Councillor on Strabane District Council in 2011. Hussey was later elected onto the newly-formed Derry and Strabane District Council in the 2014 local elections, still representing Derg, and was re-elected at the 2019 and 2023 elections.

== Convictions ==
Derek Hussey has been convicted of driving with excess alcohol on three occasions, most recently in March 2016.

This follows previous convictions in 2004, when Mr Hussey was a Member of the Legislative Assembly for West Tyrone and 2011, when he was a councillor for the Derg DEA on Strabane District Council.

Following the most recent conviction in March 2016, Alderman Hussey was suspended by the Ulster Unionist Party On completion of community service the suspension was lifted and he still sits as an Ulster Unionist member of Derry City and Strabane District Council.

== Security Forces ==
The Hussey family have a strong connection with the security forces with Hussey himself serving as a part-time Special Constable with the Ulster Special Constabulary (USC), his late father Sydney Robert Hussey had served in the Royal Navy during World War II and the USC and Ulster Defence Regiment (UDR) until his death. His mother served in the Women's Royal Naval Service and the UDR, his brother Harold William was a sergeant in the Royal Ulster Constabulary (RUC), his sister was in the UDR and Royal Irish Regiment and his politician brother Ross also served as a part-time member of the RUC.

Northern Ireland Forum
New forum	Member for West Tyrone; 1996–1998	Forum dissolved
Northern Ireland Assembly
New assembly	MLA for Tyrone, West; 1998–2007	Succeeded by Allan Bresland
