= Ross Hussey =

British politician (born 1959)

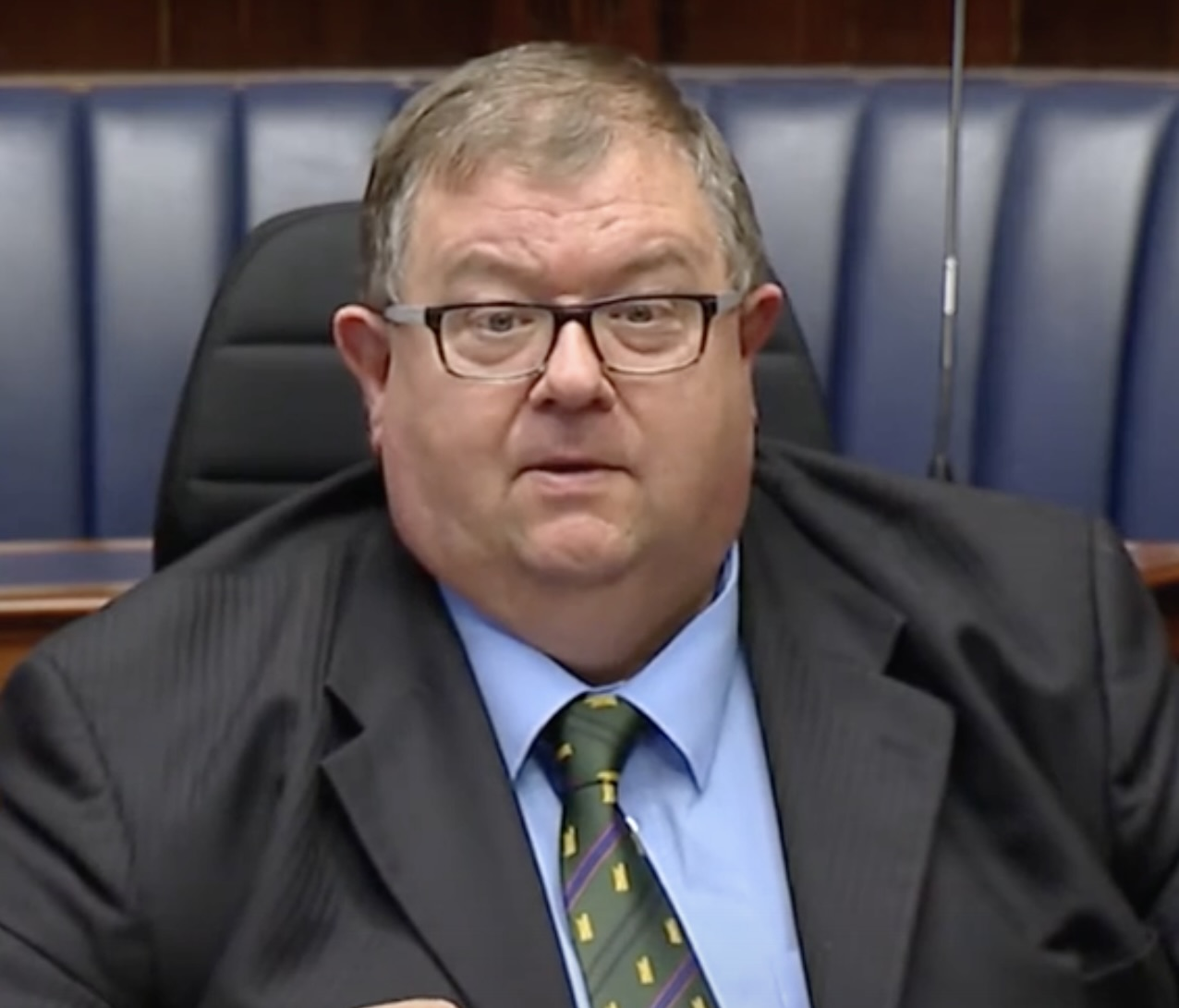
- Hussey in 2016

Member of the Northern Ireland Assembly for West Tyrone
- In office 5 May 2011 – 2 March 2017
- Preceded by: Allan Bresland
- Succeeded by: Seat abolished

Member of Omagh District Council
- In office 5 May 2005 – 22 May 2014
- Preceded by: Reuben McKelvey
- Succeeded by: Council abolished
- Constituency: Omagh Town

Personal details
- Born: 25 February 1959 (age 67) Omagh, Northern Ireland
- Party: Ulster Unionist Party
- Education: Open University

Ross Hussey is a former Ulster Unionist Party (UUP) politician in Northern Ireland. He was a Member of the Northern Ireland Assembly (MLA) for West Tyrone from 2011 to 2017.

== Early life and education ==
Ross Michael Hussey was born in Omagh on 25 February 1959. He is the son of the late Sydney Robert Hussey SRN RMN and the late Rachel Hussey (née Maguire). He is the younger brother of former Member of the Northern Ireland Assembly Derek Hussey and emeritus Professor David L Hussey and has 2 other brothers and a sister His father was Welsh and his mother from Northern Ireland.

His early education was at Omagh County Primary School, Omagh Academy and Omagh Technical College.

On leaving the college he immediately began work with Pearl Assurance as a clerk in Omagh and was promoted through various ranks retiring from Omagh in 2003 as District Manager. During his career with financial services provider Pearl, he completed all 3 parts of the Financial Planning Certificate of the Chartered Insurance Institute (CII). He retains his association with the CII as a member. He was retired as a part-time police officer due to injuries he received whilst on duty with the RUC.

Hussey studied history and then law as a mature student with the Open University. He holds a BA (Hons) degree, a certificate in humanities and a certificate in law from the OU and he is a strong advocate for the university. He holds a Diploma in Community Development from NUI Galway and a certificate in the effective management of volunteers from Queens University of Belfast. He also holds a certificate and diploma in paralegal studies from the Institute of Legal Executives (ILEX)

He is currently a mature student at Ulster University in Jordanstown undertaking study for a BSc Honours degree in Community Development

== Political career ==
Ross joined the Ulster Unionist Party in 1977 and was elected to Omagh District Council in 2005. He served as a member of the council for 7 years and stood down in 2012 following the party's decision to end 'double jobbing' and finished his council career as the Vice Chairman. He later attempted to campaign using an image of Peter Griffin, after being told that he resembled the cartoon character. Speaking to BBC News, he claimed that he shared "certain character traits" with Griffin.

At the 2010 general election, he stood in West Tyrone for Ulster Conservatives and Unionists - New Force, taking third place, with 14.2% of the vote. At the 2011 Northern Ireland Assembly election, he won a seat in West Tyrone.

Since 2011, he has been a member of the Northern Ireland Policing Board. He was previously a reservist in the Royal Ulster Constabulary and the Police Service of Northern Ireland. He was a trustee of the Royal Ulster Constabulary GC Foundation. He sustained an injury while on duty with the RUC in 2002 which caused his retirement.

Ross Hussey was re-elected for the Ulster Unionist Party for West Tyrone in the Northern Ireland Assembly Elections 2016. Following the dissolution of the Assembly in 2017, Hussey announced that he was retiring from politics on health grounds.

== Controversy ==
=== Expenses ===
Ross Husseys' expenses claims had been the focus of media attention. Claiming £20,000 per year for constituency office rent. In 2014 comedian Tim McGarry commented on an episode of BBC panel show The Blame Game that it was "the Taj Mahal of Constituency Offices". However, in his defence, Hussey regularly highlighted the fact that whilst the office rent was high he personally paid his own electricity, heating, telephone, Internet, fax, and other office costs to maintain the office.

Hussey confirmed that he would not be able to keep his current office after a review of the expenses system announced in March 2016.

Hussey retired completely from public life following the collapse of the Assembly in 2017. He had been disabled by a back injury received whilst serving in the RUC and he had to undergo replacement knee surgery in 2017. He occasionally comments on political matters but concentrates his time on providing welfare support on a voluntary basis in the West Tyrone area.

Northern Ireland Assembly
Preceded by Allan Bresland	MLA for West Tyrone; 2011 – 2017	Seat abolished
