= Joe Byrne (Northern Ireland politician) =

Northern Irish politician (1953–2025)

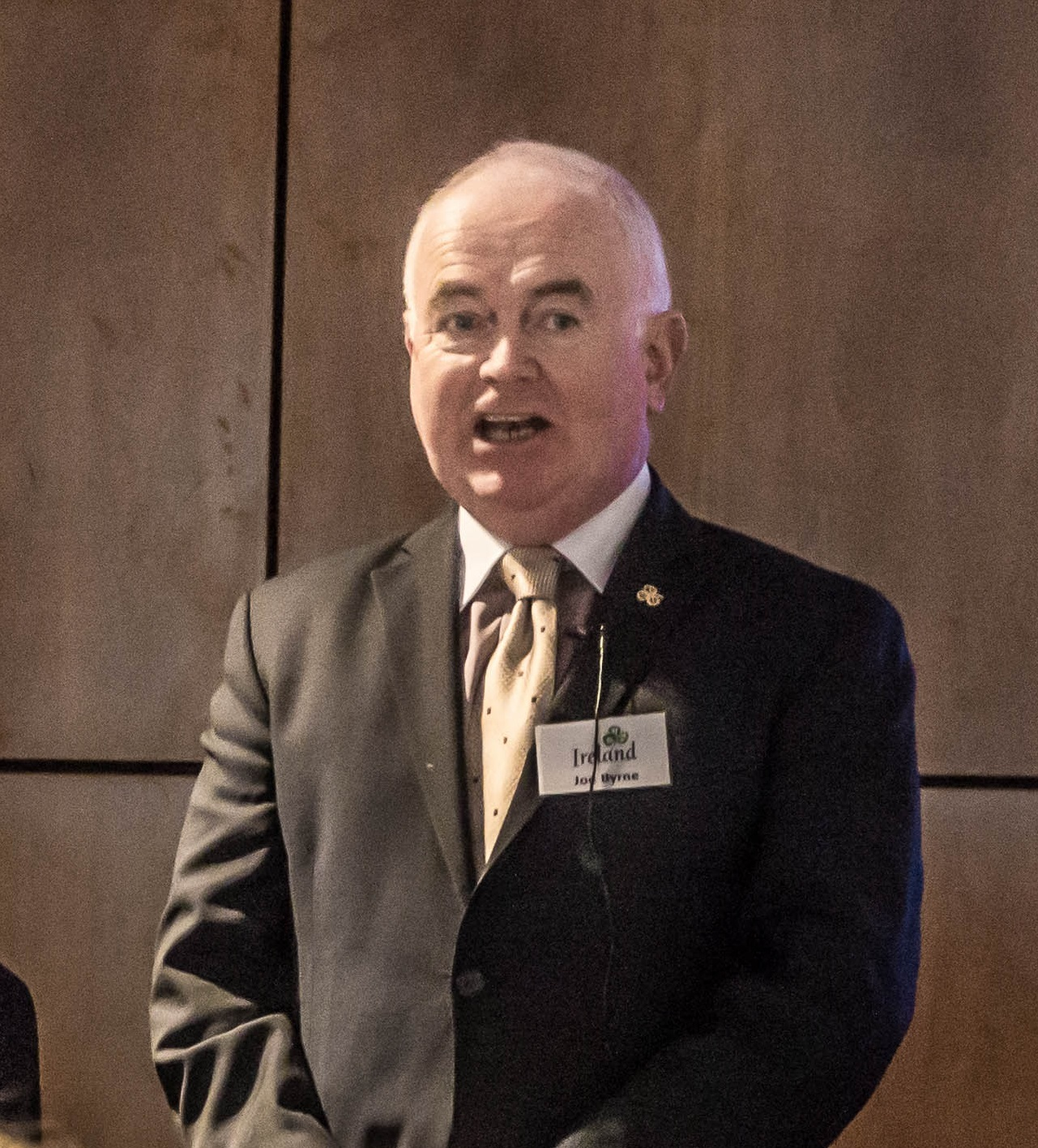

Member of the Northern Ireland Assembly for West Tyrone
- In office 25 June 1998 – 26 November 2003
- Preceded by: New Creation
- Succeeded by: Kieran Deeny
- In office 5 May 2011 – 31 December 2015
- Preceded by: Kieran Deeny
- Succeeded by: Daniel McCrossan

Member of Omagh District Council
- In office 7 June 2001 – 5 May 2005
- Preceded by: Vicent Campbell
- Succeeded by: Marty McColgan
- Constituency: Omagh Town
- In office 21 May 1997 – 7 June 2001
- Preceded by: Brian McGrath
- Succeeded by: Barney McAteer
- Constituency: Mid Tyrone
- In office 19 May 1993 – 21 May 1997
- Preceded by: Stanley Johnston
- Succeeded by: Vincent Campbell
- Constituency: Omagh Town

Northern Ireland Forum Member for West Tyrone
- In office 30 May 1996 – 25 April 1998
- Preceded by: New forum
- Succeeded by: Forum dissolved

Personal details
- Born: 29 November 1953 Castlederg, County Tyrone
- Died: 30 December 2025 (aged 72) Altnagelvin Hospital, Derry
- Party: SDLP
- Education: Queen's University Belfast

Joe Byrne (29 November 1953 – 30 December 2025) was a Social Democratic and Labour Party (SDLP) politician who was a Member of the Northern Ireland Assembly (MLA) for West Tyrone between 1998 and 2003, and again from 2011 to 2015.

== Life and career ==
Byrne was born on 29 November 1953 in Aghyaran, Castlederg, County Tyrone. After studying economics at Queen's University Belfast, Byrne became a lecturer in Business Studies at the Omagh College of Further Education. He also joined the Social Democratic and Labour Party (SDLP), and in 1993 was elected to Omagh District Council, becoming chairman in 1997.

In 1996, Byrne was elected to the Northern Ireland Forum representing West Tyrone. He was appointed to the Northern Ireland Policing Board and was only 1,161 votes away from taking the Westminster seat of West Tyrone at the 1997 general election.

He held his seat at the 1998 Northern Ireland Assembly election, but was not re-elected in 2003. In 2005, he also lost his seat on the council. In 2009, he was appointed Chairperson of the SDLP and was re-elected to the Northern Ireland Assembly in May 2011.

Byrne died on the night of 30 December 2025, at the age of 72. He had been diagnosed with Parkinson's disease some years beforehand.

Northern Ireland Forum
| New forum | Member for West Tyrone; 1996–1998 | Forum dissolved |
Northern Ireland Assembly
| New assembly | MLA for West Tyrone; 1998–2003 | Succeeded by Kieran Deeny |
| Preceded by Kieran Deeny | MLA for West Tyrone; 2011–2015 | Succeeded by Daniel McCrossan |
Party political offices
| Preceded by Eddie McGrady | Chairperson of the Social Democratic and Labour Party; 2009–2012 | Incumbent |
