= Susan-Anne White =

- Born: 21 April 1959 (age 67); Newtownabbey, Northern Ireland
- Political party: Independent

Susan-Anne White (born 21 April 1959, Belfast, Northern Ireland) is a Northern Irish Christian activist in County Tyrone. She stood for election to the local council in the 2014 Fermanagh and Omagh District Council election, receiving 67 votes. She contested the West Tyrone constituency in the 2015 General Election, and came ninth out of nine candidates, with 166 votes.

== Background ==
Originally from Newtownabbey, she moved to Trillick in 1997. Her campaign is based on ten principles drawn up by Dr Alan Clifford, a Norwich based minister whose anti-gay and anti-Islam rants have led to police investigations in the past.

She has aroused attention because of her strong and isolating views. She describes herself as biblically correct, not politically correct.

She says she would "recriminalise homosexuality, given the chance" and claims that gay people "are not born that way, they are out to recruit. We are in danger. One demand after another." She is opposed to gay people being allowed to donate blood. She would also make adultery a criminal offence, and is critical of rock music because "The lyrics are promoting immorality, the noise is deafening, and they also promote anarchy."

Her 2015 manifesto promised to "oppose the global warming fanatics and their pseudo science" and "restore the concept of a family wage with the father as the breadwinner." She told the Belfast Telegraph: "I don’t consider myself extreme – not at all. It is society that has moved. Not so far in the past, most people would have shared my views. My views are extreme because society has moved away from God's principles." She opposes feminism "with all her might", and says it is to blame for the recession. "They [feminists] are responsible for the economy - they destroyed the whole concept of a family wage with the father as the bread-winner and the stay-at-home mother. Women feel they have to be out in the workforce."

On 25 October 2017, White appeared on Nolan Live in which she expressed her opinion regarding abortion laws in Northern Ireland. White was criticised in the press following her appearance, with the BBC also facing criticism for giving her a platform.
