= Brenda Hale (Northern Ireland politician) =

Brenda Hale OBE
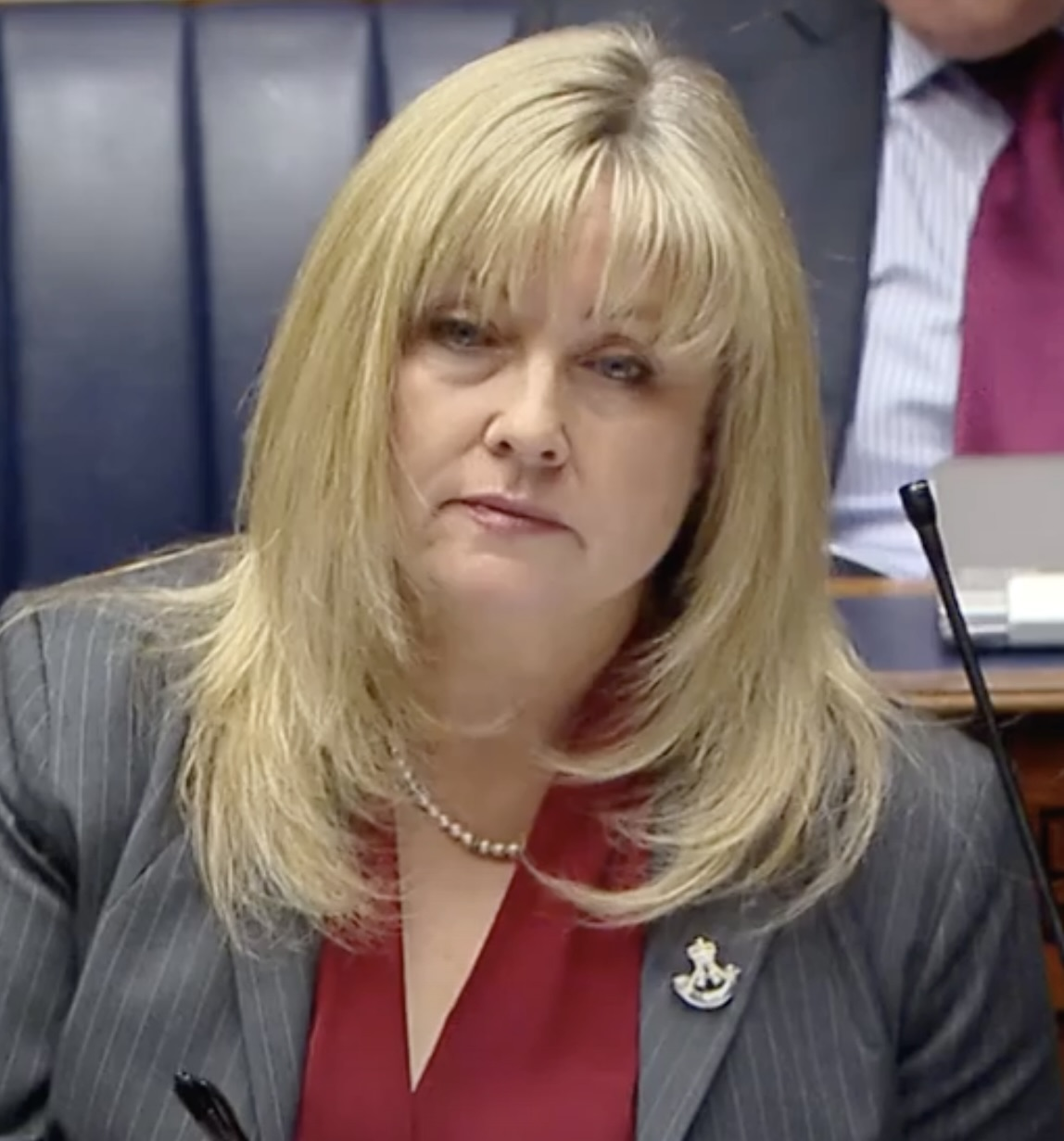

Member of the Northern Ireland Assembly for Lagan Valley
- In office 5 May 2011 – 30 January 2017
- Preceded by: Paul Butler
- Succeeded by: Pat Catney

Personal details
- Born: 29 January 1968 (age 58) Bangor, Northern Ireland
- Party: Democratic Unionist Party
- Spouse: Mark Hale (died 2009, KIA)
- Children: 2 Victoria Alexandra

Brenda Hale, OBE, (born 29 January 1968) is a Unionist politician from Northern Ireland representing the Democratic Unionist Party (DUP). She sat in the Northern Ireland Assembly as a Member of the Legislative Assembly (MLA) for Lagan Valley from 2011 until her narrow defeat at the 2017 Assembly election.

Hale's husband served with the British Army and was killed in Afghanistan in 2009. Hale then started to speak to the Ministry of Defence on behalf of other war widows. As of August 2015, she is a Political Member of the Northern Ireland Policing Board.

Her book, I Married A Soldier, was published in 2017. It details Hale's family life with her husband and daughters leading to her entry into Northern Irish politics.

Hale was honoured in the 2018 Queen's Birthday Honours list and was appointed an OBE for political service.

Northern Ireland Assembly
Preceded by Paul Butler	MLA for Lagan Valley; 2011–2017	Succeeded by Pat Catney
