= Pat Doherty (Northern Ireland politician) =

Former vice president of Sinn Féin

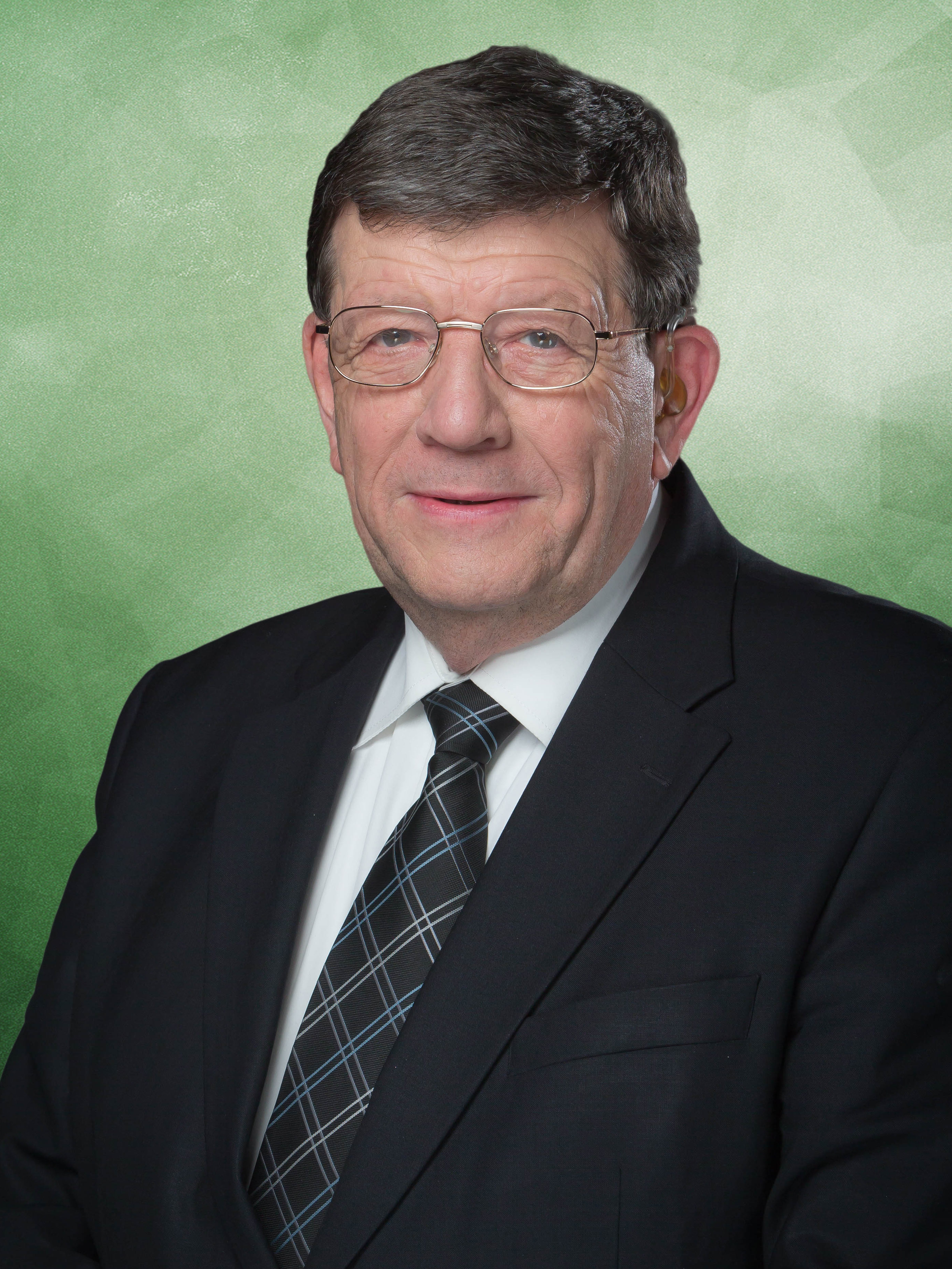
- Doherty in 2014

Vice President of Sinn Féin
- In office 10 February 1988 – 22 February 2009
- President: Gerry Adams
- Preceded by: John Joe McGirl
- Succeeded by: Mary Lou McDonald

Member of Parliament for West Tyrone
- In office 7 June 2001 – 3 May 2017
- Preceded by: William Thompson
- Succeeded by: Barry McElduff

Member of the Northern Ireland Assembly for West Tyrone
- In office 25 June 1998 – June 2012
- Preceded by: Constituency established
- Succeeded by: Declan McAleer

Northern Ireland Forum Member
- In office 30 May 1996 – 25 April 1998
- Preceded by: New forum
- Succeeded by: Forum dissolved
- Constituency: Top-up list

Personal details
- Born: 18 July 1945 (age 81) Glasgow, Scotland
- Party: Sinn Féin
- Relations: Hugh Doherty (brother)
- Website: Pat Doherty MP

Patrick Doherty (born 18 July 1945) is a retired Sinn Féin politician, who served as the abstentionist Member of Parliament (MP) for West Tyrone from 2001 to 2017. He was also a Member of the Northern Ireland Assembly (MLA) for West Tyrone from 1998 to June 2012. Doherty served as Vice President of Sinn Féin from 1988 to 2009, when Mary Lou McDonald became the party's new vice president.

== Political career ==
Doherty was born in Glasgow; his parents were from County Donegal in the Republic of Ireland. He moved to Donegal in 1968, shortly before the Troubles broke out across the Irish border. He was an abstentionist Sinn Féin Member of Parliament of the British parliament for West Tyrone from 2001 to 2017, as well as a member of the Northern Ireland Assembly from the 1998 elections until 2012. He has also stood for election in the Republic of Ireland, in the constituency of Donegal North-East in 1989, 1996 (a by-election) and 1997, and also in the Connacht–Ulster constituency in the EU elections in 1989 and 1994.

In May 2002, using parliamentary privilege, Ulster Unionist Party MP David Burnside named Doherty as a member of the IRA Army Council.

== Personal life ==
According to The Times Guide to the House of Commons, Pat Doherty is married with three daughters and two sons, was educated at St Joseph's College, Lochwinnoch, and is a site engineer who likes building stone walls. He is the brother of former Provisional IRA member Hugh Doherty, known for his involvement in the Balcombe Street siege.

Over a two-and-a-half-year period Doherty spent £16,000 on printer cartridges, an amount that he admitted was "probably excessive".

In 2012, to some surprise, Doherty supported funding for a loyalist flute band in Castlederg. He praised the band in the application for reaching out to "all sections of the community". The band had sought support for its funding application from a community group who then, unbeknownst to the band, reached out to Doherty. A spokesman for the band, whose website features a song commemorating deceased Ulster Volunteer Force member Brian Robinson, distanced themselves from the application, claiming the band was unaware of Doherty's support and did not want it. He added that "The band harbours nothing but contempt for Irish republicanism and its attacks on their community". Four of the band's members were killed by the IRA.

Party political offices
Preceded by John Joe McGirl	Vice President of Sinn Féin; 1988–2009	Succeeded by Mary Lou McDonald
Northern Ireland Forum
New forum	Regional Member; 1996–1998	Forum dissolved
Northern Ireland Assembly
New assembly	MLA for West Tyrone; 1998–2012	Succeeded by Declan McAleer
Parliament of the United Kingdom
Preceded by William Thompson	Member of Parliament for West Tyrone; 2001–2017	Succeeded by Barry McElduff
