= Allan Bresland =

Northern Irish politician (born 1945)

Member of Derry City and Strabane District Council
- In office 22 May 2014 – 26 October 2023
- Preceded by: Council created
- Succeeded by: Gary Wilkinson
- Constituency: Sperrin

Member of Strabane District Council
- In office 19 May 1993 – 22 May 2014
- Preceded by: Samuel Rogers
- Succeeded by: Council abolished
- Constituency: Glenelly

Member of the Northern Ireland Assembly for West Tyrone
- In office 7 March 2007 – 5 May 2011
- Preceded by: Derek Hussey
- Succeeded by: Ross Hussey

Personal details
- Born: 16 August 1945 (age 80) Dunamanagh, County Tyrone, Northern Ireland
- Party: Democratic Unionist Party (until 2025)
- Website: DUP profile

Allan Bresland (born 16 August 1945) is a former Democratic Unionist Party (DUP) politician who was a Derry and Strabane Councillor for the Sperrin DEA from 2014 to 2023. He was a Member of the Northern Ireland Assembly (MLA) for West Tyrone from 2007 to 2011.

== Background ==
Bresland was educated at Ballylaw Primary School, is a retired lorry driver with the Water Service. He was first elected to Strabane District Council in 1993, representing the Glenelly District.

He has been a member of various bodies including the Drainage Council of Northern Ireland, and has also served as chair of the Western Group Environmental Health Committee. He was also Chairman of North West Passage, which promotes tourism in the area and is a member of the District Policing Partnership in Strabane.

At the 2007 Northern Ireland Assembly election, he was elected as one of two DUP MLAs for West Tyrone, defeating Derek Hussey of the Ulster Unionist Party (UUP) for the sixth and last seat in the constituency.

In 2007, Bresland had among the lowest expenses recipients in the Northern Ireland Assembly at £2,185 from May to October 2007, while others were spending up to £1,000 per week.

Bresland lost his Assembly seat at the 2011 Assembly election, but was returned to Strabane District Council in the local elections that same day.

He was elected to the successor Derry City and Strabane District Council in the 2014 local elections, representing the new Sperrin District. He was re-elected to the council in 2019 and 2023. Bresland retired from the Council in October 2023, five months after his re-election.

== Personal life ==
Bresland lives in Sion Mills and is married with four children and six grandchildren. He is a member of the select vestry of the Church of the Good Shepherd, Sion Mills, an active member of the Orange Order and a founder-member of North Tyrone Credit Union. He served as a part-time member of the Ulster Defence Regiment for 15 years.

Northern Ireland Assembly
Preceded by Derek Hussey	MLA for Tyrone, West; 2007–2011	Succeeded by Ross Hussey
