= Nicola Brogan =

Northern Ireland politician

Nicola Brogan MLA
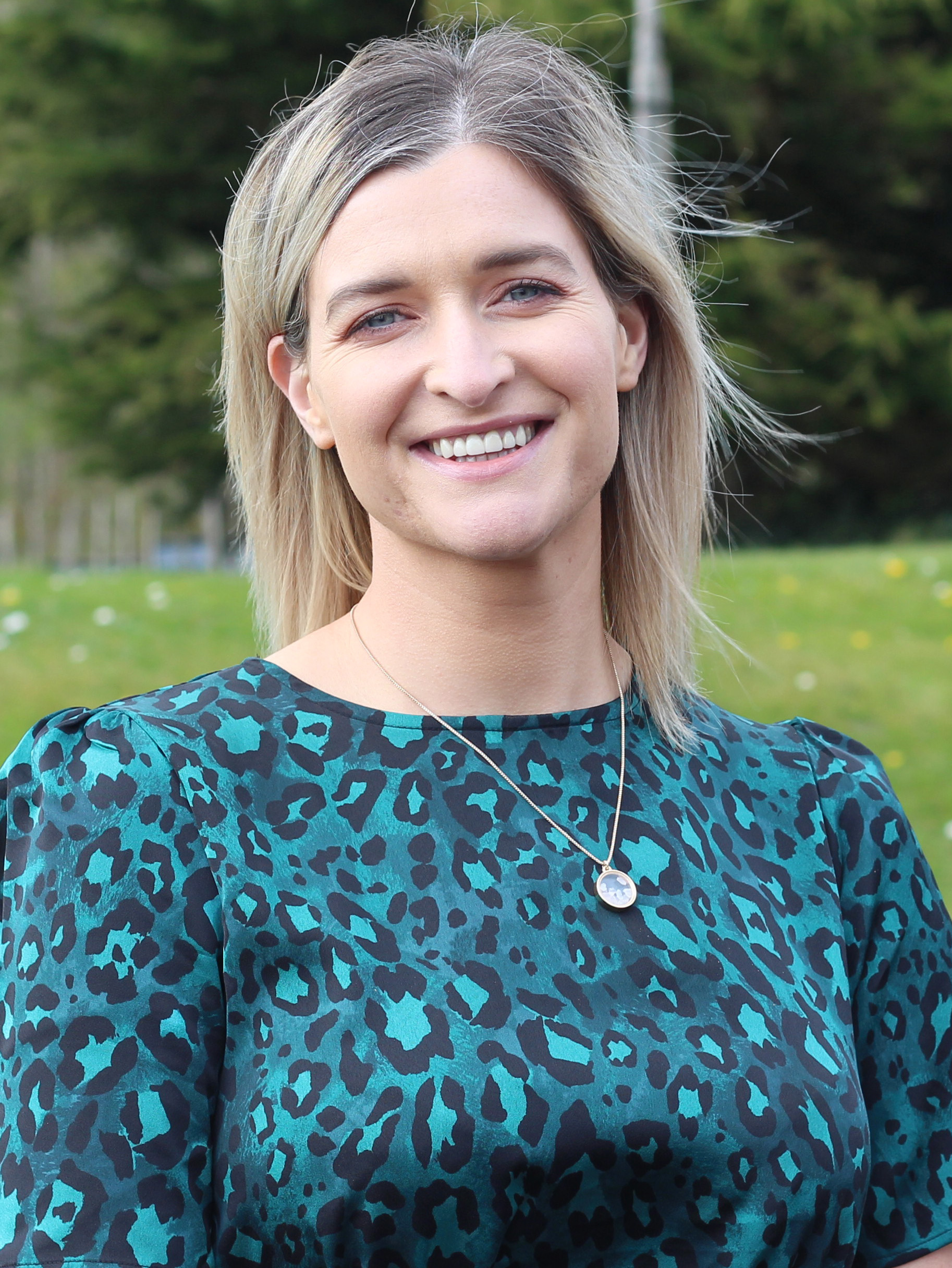
- Brogan in 2021

Member of the Northern Ireland Assembly for West Tyrone
- Incumbent
- Assumed office 31 October 2020
- Preceded by: Catherine Kelly

Personal details
- Party: Sinn Féin

Nicola Brogan MLA is an Irish Sinn Féin politician who has served as a Member of the Legislative Assembly from West Tyrone since 2020.

== Biography ==
Brogan is from Omagh in County Tyrone.

== Career ==
Brogan worked in healthcare in County Tyrone before joining the Northern Ireland Assembly; being chosen by Sinn Féin to replace Catherine Kelly who resigned.
