= Daniel McCrossan =

Politician from Northern Ireland (born 1988)

Daniel McCrossan MLA
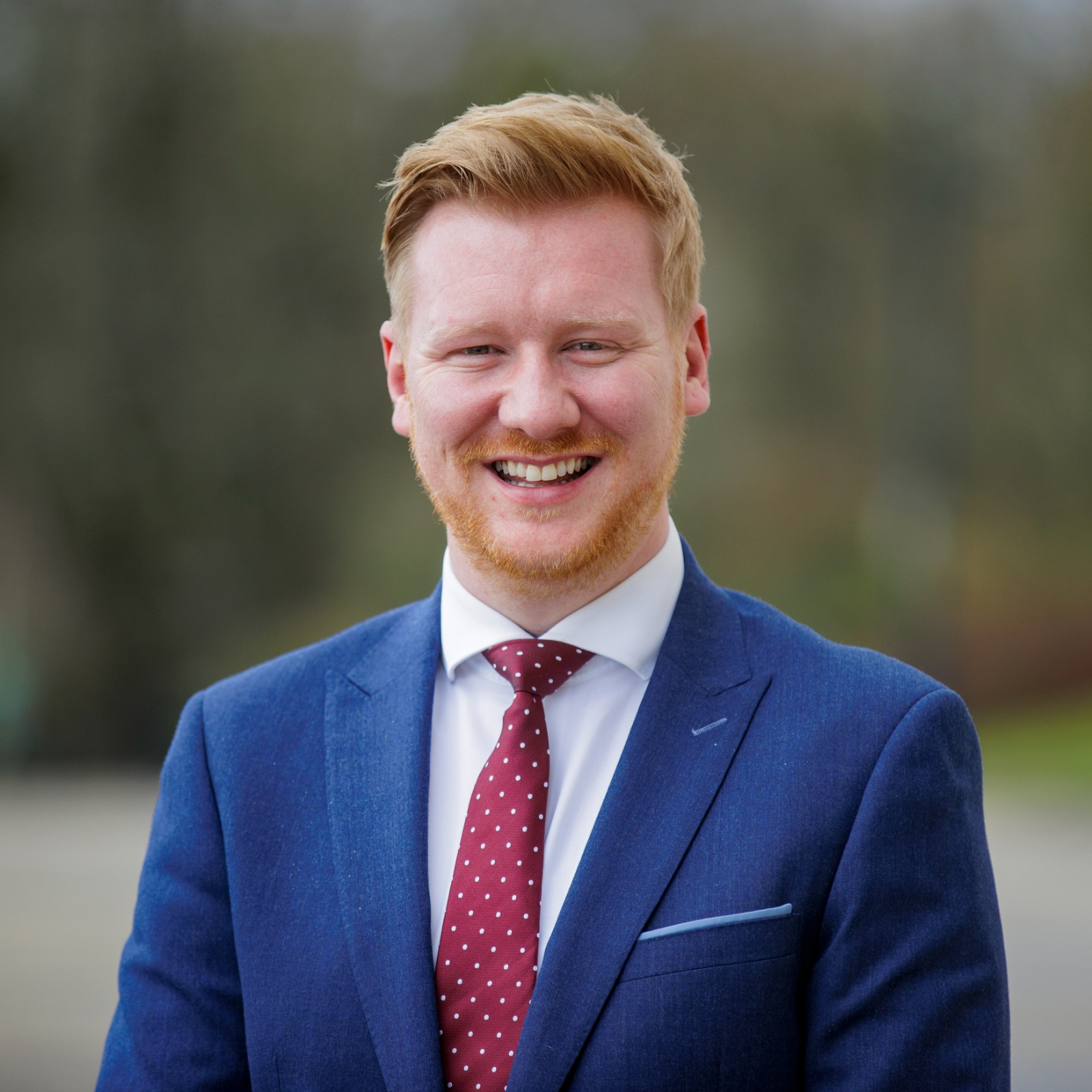
- McCrossan in 2021

Member of the Northern Ireland Assembly for West Tyrone
- Incumbent
- Assumed office 7 January 2016
- Preceded by: Joe Byrne

Personal details
- Born: 20 October 1988 (age 37) Strabane, Northern Ireland
- Party: Social Democratic and Labour Party
- Education: Liverpool John Moores University
- Occupation: Politician
- Website: website

Daniel Christopher McCrossan (born 20 October 1988) is a Social Democratic and Labour Party (SDLP) politician, who has been a Member of the Northern Ireland Assembly (MLA) for West Tyrone since 2016.

== Education ==
McCrossan attended Liverpool John Moores University where he undertook a Law Degree. His specialist areas include; Medical Negligence, Criminal Law, Family Law, Corporate Law, Tort & Contract. He has an LLB (Hons) in Law and is currently writing his PhD in law.

== Career ==
Between 2011 and 2016, McCrossan served as the SDLP's Constituency Representative for West Tyrone. Additionally, McCrossan was elected to the SDLP's National Executive Committee in 2012. His tenure on the SDLP's National Executive came to an end in 2015.

In May 2015, he stood in the 2015 United Kingdom general election for the constituency of West Tyrone. He obtained 6,444 votes, finishing 3rd behind the DUP and Sinn Féin.

In January 2016 he was co-opted to the Northern Ireland Assembly to replace retiring MLA Joe Byrne who stepped aside for health reasons.

Following the Northern Irish Assembly Election in May 2016, Daniel McCrossan was elected as an MLA for West Tyrone. Receiving 11% of the vote and 4,287 first preference votes. McCrossan was the first person to be deemed elected in the West Tyrone constituency.

In March 2017, McCrossan was re-elected as MLA for West Tyrone, increasing the SDLP vote in the constituency to 14.2%, 6,283 first preference votes. Later that year, in June 2017, McCrossan stood in the 2017 Snap Election in West Tyrone. He received 5635 votes and obtained 13% of the vote.

On 3 May 2018, a by-election was held in following the resignation of West Tyrone MP, Barry McElduff. McCrossan obtained 6254 votes with 17.9% of the overall vote. McCrossan increased the SDLP vote in West Tyrone by 4.9%.

On 12 December 2019, McCrossan stood in the 2019 Snap Election and obtained 7330 votes, finishing third and not being elected. This represented 17.8% of the vote and an overall increase of 4.8%.

During McCrossan's time in the Northern Ireland Assembly, he was held a number of positions within the Assembly and the SDLP. These include acting as the SDLP's Infrastructure, Brexit, Economy and Education Spokesperson. Additionally, McCrossan is the chairperson of the Northern Ireland Audit Committee. McCrossan also served on the Northern Ireland Policing Board from 2016 to 2017.

McCrossan's operates a constituency support office in the town of Strabane.

== Personal life ==
In August 2019, McCrossan opened a public-house in Strabane, County Tyrone.

In September 2019, McCrossan enrolled in a two-year part-time Masters in Business Administration at the Queen's University Belfast.

Northern Ireland Assembly
| Preceded by Joe Byrne | MLA for West Tyrone; 2016-present | Incumbent |
