= Declan McAleer =

Northern Ireland politician (born 1973)

Declan McAleer MLA
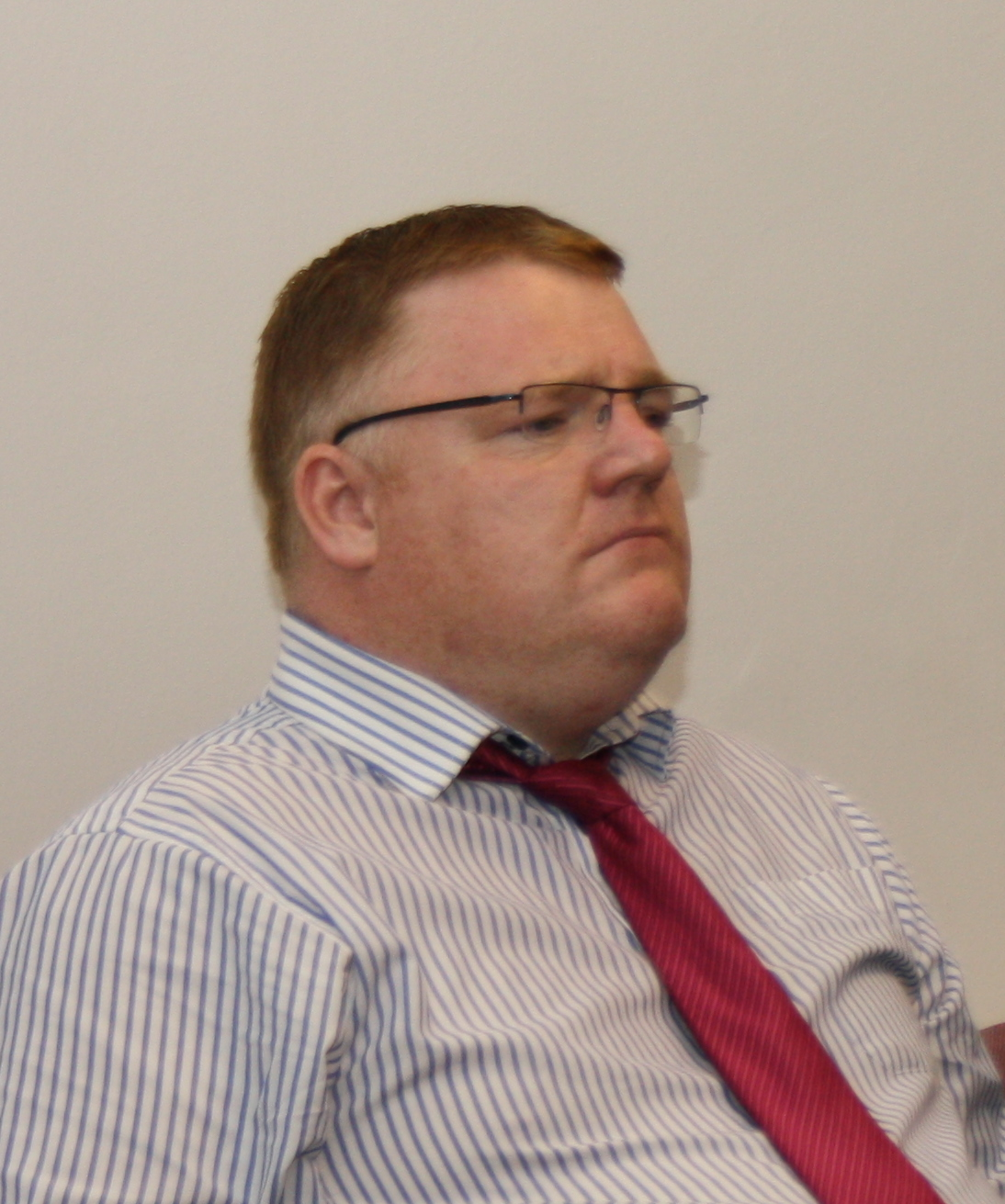

Member of the Northern Ireland Assembly for West Tyrone
- Incumbent
- Assumed office 2 July 2012
- Preceded by: Pat Doherty

Member of Omagh District Council
- In office 5 May 2005 – 22 May 2014
- Preceded by: Barney McAteer
- Succeeded by: Council abolished
- Constituency: Mid Tyrone

Personal details
- Born: 10 July 1973 (age 52) County Tyrone, Northern Ireland
- Party: Sinn Féin

Declan McAleer (born 10 July 1973) is an Irish Sinn Féin politician who was selected by his party as a member (MLA) of the Northern Ireland Assembly to represent the West Tyrone constituency in June 2012.

== Political career ==
He replaced his party colleague Pat Doherty, an abstentionist MP in the parliament of the United Kingdom, who had resigned from the Northern Ireland Assembly as part of Sinn Féin's policy of abolishing double jobbing. He previously served on a local council.

Northern Ireland Assembly
Preceded by Pat Doherty	MLA for West Tyrone; 2012–present	Incumbent
