= 1st Northern Ireland Assembly =

Northern Ireland MLAs 1998 to 2003

←	Forum	2nd Assembly	→

Overview
- Legislative body: Assembly
- Jurisdiction: Northern Ireland
- Meeting place: Parliament Buildings, Stormont
- Term: 1 July 1998 – 14 October 2002
- Election: 1998 assembly election
- Government: Executive of the 1st Assembly
- Members: 108
- Speaker: Lord Alderdice
- First Minister: David Trimble — Reg Empey until 6 November 2001 — David Trimble until 1 July 2001
- Deputy First Minister: Mark Durkan — Seamus Mallon until 6 November 2001

Sessions
- 1st: 1 July 1998 – 9 March 1999
- 2nd: 15 July 1999 – 8 February 2000
- 3rd: 5 June 2000 – 4 July 2000
- 4th: 11 September 2000 – 4 July 2001
- 5th: 10 September 2001 – 3 July 2002
- 6th: 9 September 2002 – 14 October 2002

This is a list of the 108 members of the first Northern Ireland Assembly, the unicameral devolved legislature of Northern Ireland established by the Good Friday Agreement. Members (fully Members of the Legislative Assembly, MLAs) elected in June 1998 are listed, as well as those subsequently co-opted to replace those who had resigned or deceased. MLAs are grouped by party, and changes in party affiliation are noted.

== Party strengths ==
Party		Designation	Jun 1998 election	Oct 2002 end
●	Ulster Unionist Party	Unionist	28	27
●	Social Democratic and Labour Party	Nationalist	24	23
●	Democratic Unionist Party	Unionist	20	20
●	Sinn Féin	Nationalist	18	18
	Alliance Party	Other	6	5
	UK Unionist Party	Unionist	5	1
	Progressive Unionist Party	Unionist	2	2
	Northern Ireland Women's Coalition	Other	2	2
	United Unionist Coalition	Unionist	-	3
	Northern Ireland Unionist Party	Unionist	-	3
	Independent	Nationalist	0	1
	Independent	Unionist	3	2
	Speaker	None	0	1
Totals by designation		Unionist	58	58
Totals by designation		Nationalist	42	42
Totals by designation		Other	8	5
Totals by designation		None	0	1
Total			108	
● = Northern Ireland Executive

=== Graphical representation ===
At election, 25 Jun 1998

1 Jul to 21 Sep 1998

18 Oct 2003 to end

This is not the official seating plan.

== MLAs by party ==
This is a list of MLAs elected to the Northern Ireland Assembly in the 1998 Northern Ireland Assembly election, sorted by party.

Party	Name	Constituency
Ulster Unionist Party (26)	Ian Adamson	Belfast East
Ulster Unionist Party (26)	Billy Armstrong	Mid Ulster
Ulster Unionist Party (26)	Roy Beggs, Jr.	East Antrim
Ulster Unionist Party (26)	Billy Bell	Lagan Valley
Ulster Unionist Party (26)	Esmond Birnie	South Belfast
Ulster Unionist Party (26)	Fred Cobain	Belfast North
Ulster Unionist Party (26)	Robert Coulter	North Antrim
Ulster Unionist Party (26)	Joan Carson	Fermanagh and South Tyrone
Ulster Unionist Party (26)	Ivan Davis	Lagan Valley
Ulster Unionist Party (26)	Reg Empey	Belfast East
Ulster Unionist Party (26)	Sam Foster	Fermanagh and South Tyrone
Ulster Unionist Party (26)	John Gorman	North Down
Ulster Unionist Party (26)	Tom Hamilton †	Strangford
Ulster Unionist Party (26)	Derek Hussey	West Tyrone
Ulster Unionist Party (26)	Danny Kennedy	Newry and Armagh
Ulster Unionist Party (26)	James Leslie	North Antrim
Ulster Unionist Party (26)	David McClarty	East Londonderry
Ulster Unionist Party (26)	Alan McFarland	North Down
Ulster Unionist Party (26)	Michael McGimpsey	Belfast South
Ulster Unionist Party (26)	Dermot Nesbitt	South Down
Ulster Unionist Party (26)	Duncan Shipley-Dalton	South Antrim
Ulster Unionist Party (26)	Ken Robinson	East Antrim
Ulster Unionist Party (26)	George Savage	Upper Bann
Ulster Unionist Party (26)	John Taylor	Strangford
Ulster Unionist Party (26)	David Trimble	Upper Bann
Ulster Unionist Party (26)	Jim Wilson	South Antrim
Social Democratic and Labour Party (23)	Alex Attwood	Belfast West
Social Democratic and Labour Party (23)	P. J. Bradley	South Down
Social Democratic and Labour Party (23)	Joe Byrne	West Tyrone
Social Democratic and Labour Party (23)	Michael Coyle †	East Londonderry
Social Democratic and Labour Party (23)	John Dallat	East Londonderry
Social Democratic and Labour Party (23)	Mark Durkan	Foyle
Social Democratic and Labour Party (23)	Sean Farren	North Antrim
Social Democratic and Labour Party (23)	John Fee	Newry and Armagh
Social Democratic and Labour Party (23)	Tommy Gallagher	Fermanagh and South Tyrone
Social Democratic and Labour Party (23)	Carmel Hanna	Belfast South
Social Democratic and Labour Party (23)	Denis Haughey	Mid Ulster
Social Democratic and Labour Party (23)	Joe Hendron	Belfast West
Social Democratic and Labour Party (23)	Patricia Lewsley	Lagan Valley
Social Democratic and Labour Party (23)	Alban Maginness	Belfast North
Social Democratic and Labour Party (23)	Seamus Mallon	Newry and Armagh
Social Democratic and Labour Party (23)	Donovan McClelland	South Antrim
Social Democratic and Labour Party (23)	Alasdair McDonnell	Belfast South
Social Democratic and Labour Party (23)	Eddie McGrady	South Down
Social Democratic and Labour Party (23)	Eugene McMenamin	West Tyrone
Social Democratic and Labour Party (23)	Danny O'Connor	East Antrim
Social Democratic and Labour Party (23)	Eamon O'Neill	South Down
Social Democratic and Labour Party (23)	Bríd Rodgers	Upper Bann
Social Democratic and Labour Party (23)	John Tierney	Foyle
Democratic Unionist Party (21)	Paul Berry	Newry and Armagh
Democratic Unionist Party (21)	Gregory Campbell	East Londonderry
Democratic Unionist Party (21)	Mervyn Carrick	Upper Bann
Democratic Unionist Party (21)	Wilson Clyde	South Antrim
Democratic Unionist Party (21)	Nigel Dodds	Belfast North
Democratic Unionist Party (21)	Oliver Gibson	West Tyrone
Democratic Unionist Party (21)	William Hay	Foyle
Democratic Unionist Party (21)	David Hilditch	East Antrim
Democratic Unionist Party (21)	William McCrea	Mid Ulster
Democratic Unionist Party (21)	Maurice Morrow	Fermanagh and South Tyrone
Democratic Unionist Party (21)	Ian Paisley	North Antrim
Democratic Unionist Party (21)	Ian Paisley Jr	North Antrim
Democratic Unionist Party (21)	Edwin Poots	Lagan Valley
Democratic Unionist Party (21)	Iris Robinson	Strangford
Democratic Unionist Party (21)	Mark Robinson	Belfast South
Democratic Unionist Party (21)	Peter Robinson	Belfast East
Democratic Unionist Party (21)	Jim Shannon	Strangford
Democratic Unionist Party (21)	Denis Watson ‡	Upper Bann
Democratic Unionist Party (21)	Peter Weir ‡	North Down
Democratic Unionist Party (21)	Jim Wells	South Down
Democratic Unionist Party (21)	Sammy Wilson	Belfast East
Sinn Féin (18)	Gerry Adams	Belfast West
Sinn Féin (18)	Bairbre de Brún	Belfast West
Sinn Féin (18)	Pat Doherty	West Tyrone
Sinn Féin (18)	Michelle Gildernew	Fermanagh and South Tyrone
Sinn Féin (18)	Gerry Kelly	Belfast North
Sinn Féin (18)	John Kelly	Mid Ulster
Sinn Féin (18)	Alex Maskey	Belfast West
Sinn Féin (18)	Barry McElduff	West Tyrone
Sinn Féin (18)	Martin McGuinness	Mid Ulster
Sinn Féin (18)	Gerry McHugh	Fermanagh and South Tyrone
Sinn Féin (18)	Mitchel McLaughlin	Foyle
Sinn Féin (18)	Pat McNamee	Newry and Armagh
Sinn Féin (18)	Francie Molloy	Mid Ulster
Sinn Féin (18)	Conor Murphy	Newry and Armagh
Sinn Féin (18)	Mick Murphy	South Down
Sinn Féin (18)	Mary Nelis	Foyle
Sinn Féin (18)	Dara O'Hagan	Upper Bann
Sinn Féin (18)	Sue Ramsey	Belfast West
Alliance Party of Northern Ireland (5)	Eileen Bell	North Down
Alliance Party of Northern Ireland (5)	Seamus Close	Lagan Valley
Alliance Party of Northern Ireland (5)	David Ford	South Antrim
Alliance Party of Northern Ireland (5)	Kieran McCarthy	Strangford
Alliance Party of Northern Ireland (5)	Seán Neeson	East Antrim
Progressive Unionist Party (2)	David Ervine	Belfast East
Progressive Unionist Party (2)	Billy Hutchinson	Belfast North
Northern Ireland Women's Coalition (2)	Monica McWilliams	Belfast South
Northern Ireland Women's Coalition (2)	Jane Morrice	North Down
UK Unionist Party (2)	Pauline Armitage ‡	East Londonderry
UK Unionist Party (2)	Robert McCartney	North Down
Northern Ireland Unionist Party (3)	Norman Boyd ‡	South Antrim
Northern Ireland Unionist Party (3)	Patrick Roche ‡	Lagan Valley
Northern Ireland Unionist Party (3)	Cedric Wilson ‡	Strangford
United Unionist Coalition (2)	Fraser Agnew ‡	Belfast North
United Unionist Coalition (2)	Boyd Douglas ‡	East Londonderry
Independent Unionist (2)	Roger Hutchinson ‡	East Antrim
Independent Unionist (2)	Gardiner Kane ‡	North Antrim
Independent Nationalist (1)	Annie Courtney †‡	Foyle
Speaker (1)	John Alderdice ‡	Belfast East

† Co-opted to replace an elected MLA

‡ Changed affiliation during the term

== MLAs by constituency ==
The list is given in alphabetical order by constituency.

Members of the 1st Northern Ireland Assembly
Constituency	Name	Party
Belfast East	Ian Adamson	Ulster Unionist Party
Belfast East	John Alderdice ‡	Speaker
Belfast East	Reg Empey	Ulster Unionist Party
Belfast East	David Ervine	Progressive Unionist Party
Belfast East	Peter Robinson	Democratic Unionist Party
Belfast East	Sammy Wilson	Democratic Unionist Party
Belfast North	Fraser Agnew ‡	United Unionist Coalition
Belfast North	Fred Cobain	Ulster Unionist Party
Belfast North	Nigel Dodds	Democratic Unionist Party
Belfast North	Billy Hutchinson	Progressive Unionist Party
Belfast North	Gerry Kelly	Sinn Féin
Belfast North	Alban Maginness	Social Democratic and Labour Party
Belfast South	Esmond Birnie	Ulster Unionist Party
Belfast South	Carmel Hanna	Social Democratic and Labour Party
Belfast South	Alasdair McDonnell	Social Democratic and Labour Party
Belfast South	Michael McGimpsey	Ulster Unionist Party
Belfast South	Monica McWilliams	Northern Ireland Women's Coalition
Belfast South	Mark Robinson	Democratic Unionist Party
Belfast West	Gerry Adams	Sinn Féin
Belfast West	Alex Attwood	Social Democratic and Labour Party
Belfast West	Bairbre de Brún	Sinn Féin
Belfast West	Joe Hendron	Social Democratic and Labour Party
Belfast West	Alex Maskey	Sinn Féin
Belfast West	Sue Ramsey	Sinn Féin
East Antrim	Roy Beggs, Jr.	Ulster Unionist Party
East Antrim	Sean Neeson	Alliance Party of Northern Ireland
East Antrim	David Hilditch	Democratic Unionist Party
East Antrim	Roger Hutchinson ‡	Independent Unionist
East Antrim	Danny O'Connor	Social Democratic and Labour Party
East Antrim	Ken Robinson	Ulster Unionist Party
East Londonderry	Pauline Armitage ‡	United Kingdom Unionist Party
East Londonderry	Gregory Campbell	Democratic Unionist Party
East Londonderry	Michael Coyle †	Social Democratic and Labour Party
East Londonderry	John Dallat	Social Democratic and Labour Party
East Londonderry	Boyd Douglas ‡	United Unionist Coalition
East Londonderry	David McClarty	Ulster Unionist Party
Fermanagh and South Tyrone	Joan Carson	Ulster Unionist Party
Fermanagh and South Tyrone	Sam Foster	Ulster Unionist Party
Fermanagh and South Tyrone	Tommy Gallagher	Social Democratic and Labour Party
Fermanagh and South Tyrone	Michelle Gildernew	Sinn Féin
Fermanagh and South Tyrone	Gerry McHugh	Sinn Féin
Fermanagh and South Tyrone	Maurice Morrow	Democratic Unionist Party
Foyle	Annie Courtney †‡	Independent Nationalist
Foyle	Mark Durkan	Social Democratic and Labour Party
Foyle	William Hay	Democratic Unionist Party
Foyle	Mitchel McLaughlin	Sinn Féín
Foyle	Mary Nelis	Sinn Féín
Foyle	John Tierney	Social Democratic and Labour Party
Lagan Valley	Billy Bell	Ulster Unionist Party
Lagan Valley	Seamus Close	Alliance Party of Northern Ireland
Lagan Valley	Ivan Davis	Ulster Unionist Party
Lagan Valley	Patricia Lewsley	Social Democratic and Labour Party
Lagan Valley	Edwin Poots	Democratic Unionist Party
Lagan Valley	Patrick Roche ‡	Northern Ireland Unionist Party
Mid Ulster	Billy Armstrong	Ulster Unionist Party
Mid Ulster	Denis Haughey	Social Democratic and Labour Party
Mid Ulster	John Kelly	Sinn Féin
Mid Ulster	William McCrea	Democratic Unionist Party
Mid Ulster	Martin McGuinness	Sinn Féin
Mid Ulster	Francie Molloy	Sinn Féin
Newry and Armagh	Paul Berry	Democratic Unionist Party
Newry and Armagh	John Fee	Social Democratic and Labour Party
Newry and Armagh	Danny Kennedy	Ulster Unionist Party
Newry and Armagh	Pat McNamee	Sinn Féin
Newry and Armagh	Conor Murphy	Sinn Féin
Newry and Armagh	Seamus Mallon	Social Democratic and Labour Party
North Antrim	Robert Coulter	Ulster Unionist Party
North Antrim	Sean Farren	Social Democratic and Labour Party
North Antrim	Gardiner Kane ‡	Independent Unionist
North Antrim	James Leslie	Ulster Unionist Party
North Antrim	Ian Paisley	Democratic Unionist Party
North Antrim	Ian Paisley Jr	Democratic Unionist Party
North Down	Eileen Bell	Alliance Party of Northern Ireland
North Down	John Gorman	Ulster Unionist Party
North Down	Robert McCartney	United Kingdom Unionist Party
North Down	Alan McFarland	Ulster Unionist Party
North Down	Jane Morrice	Northern Ireland Women's Coalition
North Down	Peter Weir ‡	Democratic Unionist Party
South Antrim	Norman Boyd ‡	Northern Ireland Unionist Party
South Antrim	Wilson Clyde	Democratic Unionist Party
South Antrim	David Ford	Alliance Party of Northern Ireland
South Antrim	Donovan McClelland	Social Democratic and Labour Party
South Antrim	Duncan Shipley-Dalton	Ulster Unionist Party
South Antrim	Jim Wilson	Ulster Unionist Party
South Down	P. J. Bradley	Social Democratic and Labour Party
South Down	Dermot Nesbitt	Ulster Unionist Party
South Down	Eddie McGrady	Social Democratic and Labour Party
South Down	Mick Murphy	Sinn Féin
South Down	Eamon O'Neill	Social Democratic and Labour Party
South Down	Jim Wells	Democratic Unionist Party
Strangford	Tom Hamilton †	Ulster Unionist Party
Strangford	Kieran McCarthy	Alliance Party of Northern Ireland
Strangford	Iris Robinson	Democratic Unionist Party
Strangford	Jim Shannon	Democratic Unionist Party
Strangford	John Taylor	Ulster Unionist Party
Strangford	Cedric Wilson ‡	Northern Ireland Unionist Party
Upper Bann	Mervyn Carrick	Democratic Unionist Party
Upper Bann	Dara O'Hagan	Sinn Féin
Upper Bann	Bríd Rodgers	Social Democratic and Labour Party
Upper Bann	George Savage	Ulster Unionist Party
Upper Bann	David Trimble	Ulster Unionist Party
Upper Bann	Denis Watson ‡	Democratic Unionist Party
West Tyrone	Joe Byrne	Social Democratic and Labour Party
West Tyrone	Pat Doherty	Sinn Féin
West Tyrone	Oliver Gibson	Democratic Unionist Party
West Tyrone	Derek Hussey	Ulster Unionist Party
West Tyrone	Barry McElduff	Sinn Féin
West Tyrone	Eugene McMenamin	Social Democratic and Labour Party

† Co-opted to replace an elected MLA ‡ Changed affiliation during the term

== Changes since the election ==
=== † Co-options ===
Date co-opted	Constituency	Party	Outgoing	Co-optee	Reason
11 December 2000	Foyle	SDLP	John Hume	Annie Courtney	Resignation of John Hume.
22 January 2001	Strangford	UUP	Tom Benson	Tom Hamilton	Death of Tom Benson.
9 September 2002	East Londonderry	SDLP	Arthur Doherty	Michael Coyle	Death of Arthur Doherty.

=== ‡ Changes in affiliation ===
Date	Constituency	Name	Previous affiliation	New affiliation	Circumstance
21 September 1998	Belfast North	Fraser Agnew	Ind. Unionist	United Unionist Coalition	Fraser Agnew established a new political party to access facilities provided to Assembly parties.
21 September 1998	East Londonderry	Boyd Douglas	Ind. Unionist	United Unionist Coalition	Boyd Douglas established a new political party to access facilities provided to Assembly parties.
21 September 1998	Upper Bann	Denis Watson	Ind. Unionist	United Unionist Coalition	Denis Watson established a new political party to access facilities provided to Assembly parties.
4 January 1999	Strangford	Cedric Wilson	UK Unionist	Ind. Unionist	Cedric Wilson left the UKUP in response to proposals from Robert McCartney to resign their Assembly seats in opposition to Sinn Féin participating in the Executive.
4 January 1999	South Antrim	Norman Boyd	UK Unionist	Ind. Unionist	Norman Boyd left the UKUP in response to proposals from Robert McCartney to resign their Assembly seats in opposition to Sinn Féin participating in the Executive.
4 January 1999	Lagan Valley	Patrick Roche	UK Unionist	Ind. Unionist	Patrick Roche left the UKUP in response to proposals from Robert McCartney to resign their Assembly seats in opposition to Sinn Féin participating in the Executive.
4 January 1999	East Antrim	Roger Hutchinson	UK Unionist	Ind. Unionist	Roger Hutchinson left the UKUP in response to proposals from Robert McCartney to resign their Assembly seats in opposition to Sinn Féin participating in the Executive.
24 March 1999	Strangford	Cedric Wilson	Ind. Unionist	NI Unionist	Cedric Wilson established the NIUP having recently left the UKUP.
24 March 1999	South Antrim	Norman Boyd	Ind. Unionist	NI Unionist	Norman Boyd established the NIUP having recently left the UKUP.
24 March 1999	Lagan Valley	Patrick Roche	Ind. Unionist	NI Unionist	Patrick Roche established the NIUP having recently left the UKUP.
24 March 1999	East Antrim	Roger Hutchinson	Ind. Unionist	NI Unionist	Roger Hutchinson established the NIUP having recently left the UKUP.
1 December 1999	East Antrim	Roger Hutchinson	NI Unionist	Ind. Unionist	Roger Hutchinson expelled from the NIUP for sitting on Assembly committees against party policy.
5 July 2000	Upper Bann	Denis Watson	United Unionist Coalition	DUP	Denis Watson joined the DUP.
2 November 2001	East Londonderry	Pauline Armitage	UUP	Ind. Unionist	Pauline Armitage suspended from the UUP for voting against the party whip.
9 November 2001	North Down	Peter Weir	UUP	Ind. Unionist	Peter Weir expelled from the UUP for refusing to support the re-nomination of David Trimble as First Minister.
1 April 2002	East Antrim	Roger Hutchinson	Ind. Unionist	DUP	Roger Hutchinson joined the DUP.
30 April 2002	North Down	Peter Weir	Ind. Unionist	DUP	Peter Weir joined the DUP.
11 November 2002	North Antrim	Gardiner Kane	DUP	Ind. Unionist	Gardiner Kane resigned from the DUP.
1 April 2003	Foyle	Annie Courtney	SDLP	Ind. Nationalist	Annie Courtney resigned from the SDLP after not being re-selected by the party as a candidate for the 2003 Assembly election.
12 June 2003	East Londonderry	Pauline Armitage	Ind. Unionist	UK Unionist	Pauline Armitage resigned her membership of UUP and joined the UKUP.
18 October 2003	East Antrim	Roger Hutchinson	DUP	Ind. Unionist	Roger Hutchinson resigned from the DUP to contest the 2003 Assembly election as an independent unionist.

== See also ==
- Members of the Northern Ireland Assembly
- Members of the Northern Ireland Forum
- Northern Ireland MPs
