= Electoral history of the Ulster Unionist Party =

The Ulster Unionist Party held the majority of Northern Ireland seats in most elections for the Westminster Parliament between 1922 and 2001. Since then its representation has been low or non-existent, having been eclipsed by the Democratic Unionist Party. It always had an absolute majority in the Stormont Parliament (1921–1972); since that Parliament was replaced by the Northern Ireland Assembly it has had a substantial minority representation there. Its share of the vote in Northern Ireland local government elections has tended to diminish, so that there too it is no longer the largest party. Finally, the party has always held one of the three Northern Ireland seats in the European Parliament. Its share of the Northern Ireland vote in the most recent elections to these bodies has been between 10.5% (Westminster 2017) and 16.1% (local government, 2014).

== Westminster ==
Election	House of Commons	Share of votes	Seats	+/-
1922	32nd	51.9%	11 / 13	Steady
1923	33rd	48.4%	11 / 13	Steady
1924	34th	86.9%	13 / 13	▲2
1929	35th	69.5%	11 / 13	▼2
1931	36th	53.0%	11 / 13	Steady
1935	37th	64.9%	11 / 13	Steady
1945	38th	54.6%	9 / 13	▼2
1950	39th	62.8%	10 / 12	▲1
1951	40th	59.4%	9 / 12	▼1
1955	41st	68.5%	10 / 12	▲1
1959	42nd	77.2%	12 / 12	▲2
1964	43rd	63.2%	12 / 12	Steady
1966	44th	61.8%	9 / 12	▼3
1970	45th	54.2%	8 / 12	▼1
1974 (Feb)	46th	32.3%	7 / 12	▼1
1974 (Oct)	47th	36.5%	6 / 12	▼1
1979	48th	36.6%	5 / 12	▼1
1983	49th	34.0%	11 / 17	▲6
1987	50th	37.8%	9 / 17	▼2
1992	51st	34.5%	9 / 17	Steady
1997	52nd	32.7%	10 / 18	▲1
2001	53rd	26.7%	6 / 18	▼4
2005	54th	17.7%	1 / 18	▼5
2010	55th	15.2%	0 / 18	▼1
2015	56th	16.0%	2 / 18	▲2
2017	57th	10.5%	0 / 18	▼2
2019	58th	11.7%	0 / 18	Steady
2024	59th	12.2%	1 / 18	▲1

== Stormont ==
Election	Body	First Preference Vote	Vote %	Seats	+/-
1921	1st Parliament	343,347	66.9%	40 / 52	
1925	2nd Parliament	211,662	55.0%	32 / 52	▼8
1929	3rd Parliament	148,579	50.8%	37 / 52	▲5
1933	4th Parliament	73,791	43.5%	36 / 52	▼1
1938	5th Parliament	187,684	56.8%	39 / 52	▲3
1945	6th Parliament	180,342	50.4%	33 / 52	▼6
1949	7th Parliament	237,411	62.7%	37 / 52	▲4
1953	8th Parliament	125,379	48.6%	38 / 52	▲1
1958	9th Parliament	106,177	44.0%	37 / 52	▼1
1962	10th Parliament	147,629	48.8%	34 / 52	▼3
1965	11th Parliament	191,896	59.1%	36 / 52	▲2
1969	12th Parliament	269,501	48.2%	36 / 52	Steady
1973	1973 Assembly	258,790	35.8%	31 / 78	▼5
1975	Constitutional Convention	167,214	25.4%	19 / 78	▼12
1982	1982 Assembly	188,277	29.7%	26 / 78	▲7
1996	Forum	181,829	24.2%	30 / 110	
1998	1st Assembly	172,225	21.3%	28 / 108	▼2
2003	2nd Assembly	156,931	22.7%	27 / 108	▼1
2007	3rd Assembly	103,145	14.9%	18 / 108	▼9
2011	4th Assembly	87,531	13.2%	16 / 108	▼2
2016	5th Assembly	87,302	12.6%	16 / 108	Steady
2017	6th Assembly	103,314	12.9%	10 / 90	▼6
2022	7th Assembly	96,390	11.2%	9 / 90	▼1

== Local government ==
Election	First Preference Vote	Vote %	Seats
1973	255,187	17.0%	194 / 517
1977	166,971	30.0%	176 / 526
1981	175,965	26.4%	151 / 526
1985	188,497	29.5%	189 / 565
1989	193,064	31.3%	194 / 565
1993	184,082	29.0%	197 / 582
1997	175,036	28.0%	185 / 575
2001	181,336	23.0%	154 / 582
2005	126,317	18.0%	115 / 582
2011	100,643	15.2%	99 / 583
2014	101,385	16.1%	88 / 462
2019	95,320	14.1%	75 / 462
2023	81,282	10.9%	54 / 462

== European Parliament ==
Election	First Preference Vote	Vote %	Seats
1979	125,169	21.9%	1 / 3
1984	147,169	21.5%	1 / 3
1989	118,785	22.2%	1 / 3
1994	133,459	23.8%	1 / 3
1999	119,507	17.6%	1 / 3
2004	91,164	16.6%	1 / 3
2009	82,893	17.1%	1 / 3
2014	83,438	13.3%	1 / 3
2019	53,052	9.3%	0 / 3
