= 2nd Northern Ireland Assembly =

Northern Ireland MLAs 2003 to 2007

←	1st Assembly	3rd Assembly	→

Overview
- Legislative body: Assembly
- Jurisdiction: Northern Ireland
- Meeting place: Parliament Buildings, Stormont
- Term: 15 May 2006 – 29 January 2007
- Election: 2003 assembly election
- Government: Executive of the 2nd Assembly (Direct Rule)
- Members: 108
- Speaker: Eileen Bell

Sessions
- 1st: 15 May 2006 – 7 July 2006
- 2nd: 11 September 2006 – 3 October 2006
- 3rd: 24 November 2006 – 29 January 2007

The Northern Ireland Assembly elected in November 2003 never met as such: Northern Ireland's devolved government and representative institutions had been suspended with the re-introduction of direct rule by the United Kingdom government on 14 October 2002. However, the persons (Members of the Legislative Assembly, MLAs) elected to the Assembly at the 2003 assembly election were called together in a non-legislative capacity, initially under the Northern Ireland Act 2006 and then under the St Andrews Agreement. These bodies failed to form a government before the 2007 election.

The following is a list of the members of that second Assembly, including members co-opted after the election to replace those who had resigned or died, and changes in party affiliation.

== Party strengths ==
Party	Designation	Nov 2003 election	Jan 2007 end
Democratic Unionist Party	Unionist	30	32
Ulster Unionist Party	Unionist	27	24
Sinn Féin	Nationalist	24	21
Social Democratic and Labour Party	Nationalist	18	18
Alliance Party	Other	6	5
UK Unionist Party	Unionist	1	1
Progressive Unionist Party	Unionist	1	1
Independent	Nationalist	0	1
Independent	Other	0	1
Independent	Unionist	1	2
Speaker (Note: While in post, the Speaker is not counted as a member of their parliamentary party.)	None	0	1
Vacant (Note: When Sinn Féin MLA Michael Ferguson died in September 2006, no substitutes were available. Sinn Féin was allowed to use his vote in the Assembly despite his death.)	Nationalist	0	1
Totals by Designation	Unionist	60	60
Totals by Designation	Nationalist	42	41
Totals by Designation	Other	6	6
Totals by Designation	None	0	1
Total		108	

=== Graphical representation ===
At election, 26 Nov 2003 (Suspended Northern Ireland Assembly)

10 Apr to 25 Sep 2006 (Suspended Northern Ireland Assembly and Assembly est. under the Northern Ireland Act 2006),

25 Sep 2006 to 15 Jan 2007 (Suspended Northern Ireland Assembly and Transitional Assembly)

2 Feb 2007 to end (Suspended Northern Ireland Assembly)

== MLAs by party ==
This is a list of MLAs elected to the Northern Ireland Assembly in the 2003 Northern Ireland Assembly election, sorted by party.

Party	Name	Constituency
Democratic Unionist Party (32)	Norah Beare ‡	Lagan Valley
Democratic Unionist Party (32)	Thomas Buchanan	West Tyrone
Democratic Unionist Party (32)	Gregory Campbell	East Londonderry
Democratic Unionist Party (32)	Wilson Clyde	South Antrim
Democratic Unionist Party (32)	George Dawson	East Antrim
Democratic Unionist Party (32)	Diane Dodds	Belfast West
Democratic Unionist Party (32)	Nigel Dodds	Belfast North
Democratic Unionist Party (32)	Jeffrey Donaldson ‡	Lagan Valley
Democratic Unionist Party (32)	Alex Easton	North Down
Democratic Unionist Party (32)	George Ennis	Strangford
Democratic Unionist Party (32)	Arlene Foster ‡	Fermanagh & South Tyrone
Democratic Unionist Party (32)	Paul Girvan	South Antrim
Democratic Unionist Party (32)	William Hay	Foyle
Democratic Unionist Party (32)	David Hilditch	East Antrim
Democratic Unionist Party (32)	Nelson McCausland	Belfast North
Democratic Unionist Party (32)	William McCrea	Mid Ulster
Democratic Unionist Party (32)	Lord Morrow	Fermanagh and South Tyrone
Democratic Unionist Party (32)	Stephen Moutray	Upper Bann
Democratic Unionist Party (32)	Robin Newton	Belfast East
Democratic Unionist Party (32)	Ian Paisley	North Antrim
Democratic Unionist Party (32)	Ian Paisley Jr	North Antrim
Democratic Unionist Party (32)	Edwin Poots	Lagan Valley
Democratic Unionist Party (32)	George Robinson	East Londonderry
Democratic Unionist Party (32)	Iris Robinson	Strangford
Democratic Unionist Party (32)	Mark Robinson	Belfast South
Democratic Unionist Party (32)	Peter Robinson	Belfast East
Democratic Unionist Party (32)	Jim Shannon	Strangford
Democratic Unionist Party (32)	David Simpson	Upper Bann
Democratic Unionist Party (32)	Mervyn Storey	North Antrim
Democratic Unionist Party (32)	Peter Weir	North Down
Democratic Unionist Party (32)	Jim Wells	South Down
Democratic Unionist Party (32)	Sammy Wilson	East Antrim
Ulster Unionist Party (24)	Billy Armstrong	Mid Ulster
Ulster Unionist Party (24)	Roy Beggs, Jr.	East Antrim
Ulster Unionist Party (24)	Billy Bell	Lagan Valley
Ulster Unionist Party (24)	Esmond Birnie	South Belfast
Ulster Unionist Party (24)	David Burnside	South Antrim
Ulster Unionist Party (24)	Fred Cobain	Belfast North
Ulster Unionist Party (24)	Michael Copeland	Belfast East
Ulster Unionist Party (24)	Robert Coulter	North Antrim
Ulster Unionist Party (24)	Leslie Cree	North Down
Ulster Unionist Party (24)	Tom Elliott	Fermanagh and South Tyrone
Ulster Unionist Party (24)	Reg Empey	Belfast East
Ulster Unionist Party (24)	Sam Gardiner	Upper Bann
Ulster Unionist Party (24)	Norman Hillis	East Londonderry
Ulster Unionist Party (24)	Derek Hussey	West Tyrone
Ulster Unionist Party (24)	Danny Kennedy	Newry and Armagh
Ulster Unionist Party (24)	David McClarty	East Londonderry
Ulster Unionist Party (24)	Alan McFarland	North Down
Ulster Unionist Party (24)	Michael McGimpsey	Belfast South
Ulster Unionist Party (24)	David McNarry	Strangford
Ulster Unionist Party (24)	Dermot Nesbitt	South Down
Ulster Unionist Party (24)	Ken Robinson	East Antrim
Ulster Unionist Party (24)	John Taylor	Strangford
Ulster Unionist Party (24)	David Trimble	Upper Bann
Ulster Unionist Party (24)	Jim Wilson	South Antrim
Sinn Féin (22)	Gerry Adams	Belfast West
Sinn Féin (22)	Francie Brolly	East Londonderry
Sinn Féin (22)	Willie Clarke	South Down
Sinn Féin (22)	Pat Doherty	West Tyrone
Sinn Féin (22)	Michelle Gildernew	Fermanagh and South Tyrone
Sinn Féin (22)	Gerry Kelly	Belfast North
Sinn Féin (22)	Alex Maskey	Belfast South
Sinn Féin (22)	Fra McCann	Belfast West
Sinn Féin (22)	Raymond McCartney †	Foyle
Sinn Féin (22)	Barry McElduff	West Tyrone
Sinn Féin (22)	Philip McGuigan	North Antrim
Sinn Féin (22)	Martin McGuinness	Mid Ulster
Sinn Féin (22)	Mitchel McLaughlin	Foyle
Sinn Féin (22)	Francie Molloy	Mid Ulster
Sinn Féin (22)	Conor Murphy	Newry and Armagh
Sinn Féin (22)	John O'Dowd	Upper Bann
Sinn Féin (22)	Patricia O'Rawe	Newry and Armagh
Sinn Féin (22)	Tom O'Reilly	Fermanagh and South Tyrone
Sinn Féin (22)	Sue Ramsey †	Belfast West
Sinn Féin (22)	Caitríona Ruane	South Down
Sinn Féin (22)	Kathy Stanton	Belfast North
Sinn Féin (22)	Vacant (Note: When Sinn Féin MLA Michael Ferguson died in September 2006, no substitutes were available. Sinn Féin was allowed to use his vote in the Assembly despite his death.)	Belfast West
Social Democratic and Labour Party (18)	Alex Attwood	Belfast West
Social Democratic and Labour Party (18)	Dominic Bradley	Newry and Armagh
Social Democratic and Labour Party (18)	Mary Bradley	Foyle
Social Democratic and Labour Party (18)	P. J. Bradley	South Down
Social Democratic and Labour Party (18)	Thomas Burns	South Antrim
Social Democratic and Labour Party (18)	John Dallat	East Londonderry
Social Democratic and Labour Party (18)	Mark Durkan	Foyle
Social Democratic and Labour Party (18)	Sean Farren	North Antrim
Social Democratic and Labour Party (18)	Marietta Farrell †	Lagan Valley
Social Democratic and Labour Party (18)	Tommy Gallagher	Fermanagh and South Tyrone
Social Democratic and Labour Party (18)	Carmel Hanna	Belfast South
Social Democratic and Labour Party (18)	Dolores Kelly	Upper Bann
Social Democratic and Labour Party (18)	Alban Maginness	Belfast North
Social Democratic and Labour Party (18)	Alasdair McDonnell	Belfast South
Social Democratic and Labour Party (18)	Patsy McGlone	Mid Ulster
Social Democratic and Labour Party (18)	Eugene McMenamin	West Tyrone
Social Democratic and Labour Party (18)	Pat Ramsey	Foyle
Social Democratic and Labour Party (18)	Margaret Ritchie	South Down
Alliance Party of Northern Ireland (5)	Seamus Close	Lagan Valley
Alliance Party of Northern Ireland (5)	David Ford	South Antrim
Alliance Party of Northern Ireland (5)	Naomi Long	East Belfast
Alliance Party of Northern Ireland (5)	Kieran McCarthy	Strangford
Alliance Party of Northern Ireland (5)	Seán Neeson	East Antrim
Progressive Unionist Party (1)	Dawn Purvis †	Belfast East
UK Unionist Party (1)	Robert McCartney	North Down
Independent (1)	Kieran Deeny	West Tyrone
Independent Unionist (1)	Paul Berry ‡	Newry and Armagh
Independent Nationalist (2)	Geraldine Dougan ‡	Mid Ulster
Independent Nationalist (2)	Davy Hyland ‡	Newry and Armagh
Speaker (1)	Eileen Bell ‡	North Down

† Co-opted to replace an elected MLA

‡ Changed affiliation during the term

== MLAs by constituency ==
The list is given in alphabetical order by constituency.

Members of the 2nd Northern Ireland Assembly
Constituency	Name	Party
Belfast East	Michael Copeland	Ulster Unionist Party
Belfast East	Reg Empey	Ulster Unionist Party
Belfast East	Naomi Long	Alliance Party of Northern Ireland
Belfast East	Robin Newton	Democratic Unionist Party
Belfast East	Dawn Purvis †	Progressive Unionist Party
Belfast East	Peter Robinson	Democratic Unionist Party
Belfast North	Fred Cobain	Ulster Unionist Party
Belfast North	Nigel Dodds	Democratic Unionist Party
Belfast North	Gerry Kelly	Sinn Féin
Belfast North	Nelson McCausland	Democratic Unionist Party
Belfast North	Alban Maginness	Social Democratic and Labour Party
Belfast North	Kathy Stanton	Sinn Féin
Belfast South	Carmel Hanna	Social Democratic and Labour Party
Belfast South	Esmond Birnie	Ulster Unionist Party
Belfast South	Alex Maskey	Sinn Féin
Belfast South	Alasdair McDonnell	Social Democratic and Labour Party
Belfast South	Michael McGimpsey	Ulster Unionist Party
Belfast South	Mark Robinson	Democratic Unionist Party
Belfast West	Gerry Adams	Sinn Féin
Belfast West	Alex Attwood	Social Democratic and Labour Party
Belfast West	Diane Dodds	Democratic Unionist Party
Belfast West	Fra McCann	Sinn Féin
Belfast West	Sue Ramsey †	Sinn Féin
Belfast West	Vacant	Sinn Féin
East Antrim	Roy Beggs, Jr.	Ulster Unionist Party
East Antrim	Sean Neeson	Alliance Party of Northern Ireland
East Antrim	David Hilditch	Democratic Unionist Party
East Antrim	George Dawson	Democratic Unionist Party
East Antrim	Ken Robinson	Ulster Unionist Party
East Antrim	Sammy Wilson	Democratic Unionist Party
East Londonderry	Francis Brolly	Sinn Féin
East Londonderry	Gregory Campbell	Democratic Unionist Party
East Londonderry	John Dallat	Social Democratic and Labour Party
East Londonderry	Norman Hillis	Ulster Unionist Party
East Londonderry	David McClarty	Ulster Unionist Party
East Londonderry	George Robinson	Democratic Unionist Party
Fermanagh and South Tyrone	Tom Elliott	Ulster Unionist Party
Fermanagh and South Tyrone	Arlene Foster ‡	Democratic Unionist Party
Fermanagh and South Tyrone	Tommy Gallagher	Social Democratic and Labour Party
Fermanagh and South Tyrone	Michelle Gildernew	Sinn Féin
Fermanagh and South Tyrone	Tom O'Reilly	Sinn Féin
Fermanagh and South Tyrone	Maurice Morrow	Democratic Unionist Party
Foyle	Mary Bradley	Social Democratic and Labour Party
Foyle	Mark Durkan	Social Democratic and Labour Party
Foyle	William Hay	Democratic Unionist Party
Foyle	Raymond McCartney †	Sinn Féín
Foyle	Mitchel McLaughlin	Sinn Féín
Foyle	Pat Ramsey	Social Democratic and Labour Party
Lagan Valley	Norah Beare ‡	Democratic Unionist Party
Lagan Valley	Billy Bell	Ulster Unionist Party
Lagan Valley	Seamus Close	Alliance Party of Northern Ireland
Lagan Valley	Jeffrey Donaldson ‡	Democratic Unionist Party
Lagan Valley	Marietta Farrell †	Social Democratic and Labour Party
Lagan Valley	Edwin Poots	Democratic Unionist Party
Mid Ulster	Billy Armstrong	Ulster Unionist Party
Mid Ulster	Geraldine Dougan ‡	Independent Nationalist
Mid Ulster	William McCrea	Democratic Unionist Party
Mid Ulster	Patsy McGlone	Social Democratic and Labour Party
Mid Ulster	Martin McGuinness	Sinn Féin
Mid Ulster	Francie Molloy	Sinn Féin
Newry and Armagh	Paul Berry ‡	Independent Unionist
Newry and Armagh	Dominic Bradley	Social Democratic and Labour Party
Newry and Armagh	Davy Hyland ‡	Independent Nationalist
Newry and Armagh	Danny Kennedy	Ulster Unionist Party
Newry and Armagh	Conor Murphy	Sinn Féin
Newry and Armagh	Patricia O'Rawe	Sinn Féin
North Antrim	Robert Coulter	Ulster Unionist Party
North Antrim	Sean Farren	Social Democratic and Labour Party
North Antrim	Philip McGuigan	Sinn Féin
North Antrim	Ian Paisley	Democratic Unionist Party
North Antrim	Ian Paisley Jr	Democratic Unionist Party
North Antrim	Mervyn Storey	Democratic Unionist Party
North Down	Eileen Bell ‡	Speaker
North Down	Leslie Cree	Ulster Unionist Party
North Down	Alex Easton	Democratic Unionist Party
North Down	Robert McCartney	UK Unionist Party
North Down	Alan McFarland	Ulster Unionist Party
North Down	Peter Weir	Democratic Unionist Party
South Antrim	David Burnside	Ulster Unionist Party
South Antrim	Trevor Clarke	Democratic Unionist Party
South Antrim	David Ford	Alliance Party of Northern Ireland
South Antrim	Paul Girvan	Democratic Unionist Party
South Antrim	Thomas Burns	Social Democratic and Labour Party
South Antrim	Jim Wilson	Ulster Unionist Party
South Down	P. J. Bradley	Social Democratic and Labour Party
South Down	Willie Clarke	Sinn Féin
South Down	Dermot Nesbitt	Ulster Unionist Party
South Down	Margaret Ritchie	Social Democratic and Labour Party
South Down	Caitríona Ruane	Sinn Féin
South Down	Jim Wells	Democratic Unionist Party
Strangford	George Ennis	Democratic Unionist Party
Strangford	Kieran McCarthy	Alliance Party of Northern Ireland
Strangford	David McNarry	Ulster Unionist Party
Strangford	Iris Robinson	Democratic Unionist Party
Strangford	Jim Shannon	Democratic Unionist Party
Strangford	John Taylor	Ulster Unionist Party
Upper Bann	Sam Gardiner	Ulster Unionist Party
Upper Bann	Dolores Kelly	Social Democratic and Labour Party
Upper Bann	Stephen Moutray	Democratic Unionist Party
Upper Bann	John O'Dowd	Sinn Féin
Upper Bann	David Simpson	Democratic Unionist Party
Upper Bann	David Trimble	Ulster Unionist Party
West Tyrone	Thomas Buchanan	Democratic Unionist Party
West Tyrone	Kieran Deeny	Independent
West Tyrone	Pat Doherty	Sinn Féin
West Tyrone	Derek Hussey	Ulster Unionist Party
West Tyrone	Barry McElduff	Sinn Féin
West Tyrone	Eugene McMenamin	Social Democratic and Labour Party

† Co-opted to replace an elected MLA ‡ Changed affiliation during the term

== Changes since the election ==
=== † Co-options ===
Date co-opted	Constituency	Party	Outgoing	Co-optee	Reason
15 July 2004	Foyle	Sinn Féin	Mary Nelis	Raymond McCartney	Resignation of Mary Nelis.
29 November 2004	Belfast West	Sinn Féin	Bairbre de Brún	Sue Ramsey	Resignation of Bairbre de Brún.
25 September 2006	Belfast West	Sinn Féin	Michael Ferguson	Vacant	Death of Michael Ferguson. The vacancy remained unfilled on the dissolution of the Assembly.
9 January 2007	Lagan Valley	SDLP	Patricia Lewsley	Marietta Farrell	Resignation of Patricia Lewsley to take up the post of Northern Ireland Commissioner for Children and Young People.
23 January 2007	Belfast East	PUP	David Ervine	Dawn Purvis	Death of David Ervine.

=== ‡ Changes in affiliation ===
Date	Constituency	Name	Previous affiliation	New affiliation	Circumstance
18 December 2003	Lagan Valley	Jeffrey Donaldson	UUP	Ind. Unionist	Jeffrey Donaldson resigned from the UUP.
18 December 2003	Lagan Valley	Norah Beare	UUP	Ind. Unionist	Norah Beare resigned from the UUP.
18 December 2003	Fermanagh and South Tyrone	Arlene Foster	UUP	Ind. Unionist	Arlene Foster resigned from the UUP.
5 January 2004	Lagan Valley	Jeffrey Donaldson	Ind. Unionist	DUP	Jeffrey Donaldson joined the DUP.
5 January 2004	Lagan Valley	Norah Beare	Ind. Unionist	DUP	Norah Beare joined the DUP.
5 January 2004	Fermanagh and South Tyrone	Arlene Foster	Ind. Unionist	DUP	Arlene Foster joined the DUP.
4 July 2005	Newry and Armagh	Paul Berry	DUP	Ind. Unionist	Paul Berry was suspended by the DUP following an internal disciplinary panel meeting and media coverage of his private life. He resigned from the party outright following legal challenges on 10 February 2006.
23 November 2005	Mid Ulster	Francie Molloy	Sinn Féin	Ind. Nationalist	Francie Molloy was suspended by Sinn Féin on 23 November 2005 following disagreements about reforms of local government. Molloy was subsequently readmitted to the party.
10 April 2006	North Down	Eileen Bell	Alliance	Speaker	Eileen Bell was appointed Speaker of the Assembly on 10 April 2006 for the first session on 15 May.
15 January 2007	Mid Ulster	Geraldine Dougan	Sinn Féin	Ind. Nationalist	Geraldine Dougan resigned from Sinn Féin.
2 February 2007	Newry and Armagh	Davy Hyland	Sinn Féin	Ind. Nationalist	Davy Hyland resigned from Sinn Féin.

== See also ==
- Members of the Northern Ireland Assembly elected in 1998
- Members of the Northern Ireland Forum elected in 1996
- Northern Ireland MPs
- 2007 Northern Ireland Assembly election
