= Roger Hutchinson =

Member of Newtownabbey Borough Council
- In office 7 June 2001 – 5 May 2005
- Preceded by: William Greer
- Succeeded by: Robert Hill
- Constituency: University

Member of the Northern Ireland Assembly for Antrim East
- In office 25 June 1998 – 26 November 2003
- Preceded by: New Creation
- Succeeded by: Sammy Wilson

Personal details
- Born: 28 June 1952 (age 73) County Antrim, Northern Ireland
- Party: Independent Unionist (1999 - 2000; 2003 - 2005); Democratic Unionist Party (2000 - 2003)
- Other political affiliations: NI Unionist Party (1999); UK Unionist Party (until 1998)

Roger Hutchinson (born 28 June 1952) is a former Northern Irish unionist politician and church minister who was a Member of the Northern Ireland Assembly (MLA) for East Antrim from 1998 to 2003.

== Career ==
After attending Larne Technical College, Hutchinson became a religious minister. He also joined the Orange Order. He moved into business in 1990.

Hutchinson was elected to the Northern Ireland Assembly in 1998 for the UK Unionist Party (UKUP) in East Antrim. With three of the other four UKUP members in the Assembly, he left in January 1999, disagreeing with leader Robert McCartney's policy of resigning from the Assembly should Sinn Féin become part of the power sharing executive. They formed the Northern Ireland Unionist Party (NIUP).

At the end of 1999, Hutchinson was expelled from the NIUP for accepting seats on two statutory committees, against party policy. He then sat as an independent Unionist. In November 2000, he joined the Democratic Unionist Party (DUP), and he was elected to Newtownabbey Borough Council for the DUP in 2001. He officially became part of the DUP Assembly group in April 2002. However, he resigned from the DUP before the 2003 Assembly election, in which he stood in East Antrim as an independent, failing to be elected.

Hutchinson did not restand for his council seat in the 2005 elections. In January 2007 at Belfast Crown Court, he denied sexually assaulting a female council employee.

Northern Ireland Assembly
New assembly	MLA for Antrim East; 1998–2003	Succeeded by Sammy Wilson
