= Patrick Roche (Northern Ireland politician) =

Deputy leader of the Northern Ireland Unionist Party
- In office January 1999 – 10 March 2008
- Leader: Cedric Wilson
- Preceded by: Office created
- Succeeded by: Office abolished

Member of the Northern Ireland Assembly for Lagan Valley
- In office 25 June 1998 – 26 November 2003
- Preceded by: New Creation
- Succeeded by: Jeffrey Donaldson

Personal details
- Born: 1940 (age 85–86) County Down, Northern Ireland
- Party: TUV (2008 - present)
- Other political affiliations: NI Unionist (1999 - 2008); UK Unionist Party (1996 - 1998)
- Education: Durham University, Trinity College, Dublin

Patrick J. "Paddy" Roche (born 1940) is a former Northern Irish unionist politician and banker who served as Deputy leader of the Northern Ireland Unionist Party (NIUP) from 1999 to 2008, and was a Member of the Northern Ireland Assembly (MLA) for Lagan Valley from 1998 to 2003.

== Career ==
After working in banking, Roche studied economics and politics at Trinity College, Dublin. This was followed by political philosophy at the University of Durham, where he earned an MA in Social Sciences in 1972 as a member of the Graduate Society. He then became a lecturer in economics at the University of Ulster, and in 1978 also took up a post at the Irish Baptist College. He wrote a number of books on politics and economics in Northern Ireland.

Roche joined the UK Unionist Party (UKUP) and headed their list in South Belfast for the Northern Ireland Forum election in 1996, but was not elected.

At the 1998 Northern Ireland Assembly election, Roche was elected in Lagan Valley. With three of the other four UKUP members in the Assembly, he left in January 1999, disagreeing with leader Robert McCartney's policy of resigning from the Assembly should Sinn Féin become part of the power sharing executive. They formed the Northern Ireland Unionist Party (NIUP), and Roche became deputy leader.

During his time in the Assembly, Roche proposed a motion on sectarianism. During the debate, he called Sinn Féin MLA Gerry Kelly a convicted murderer. Kelly was convicted of conspiracy to cause an explosion in London in 1973, but not murder. He pointed this out, and when Roche refused to withdraw his comment, he was ordered to leave the chamber. Roche did not contest his seat at the 2003 election, at which the NIUP lost all its seats.

Roche would later join the Traditional Unionist Voice (TUV), and currently serves as President of their North Down Association.

Northern Ireland Assembly
New assembly	MLA for Lagan Valley; 1998–2003	Succeeded by Jeffrey Donaldson
