= 3rd Northern Ireland Assembly =

Northern Ireland MLAs 2007 to 2011

←	2nd Assembly	4th Assembly	→

Overview
- Legislative body: Assembly
- Jurisdiction: Northern Ireland
- Meeting place: Parliament Buildings, Stormont
- Term: 13 March 2007 – 23 March 2011
- Election: 2007 assembly election
- Government: Executive of the 3rd Assembly
- Members: 108
- Speaker: William Hay — Eileen Bell until 8 May 2007
- First Minister: Peter Robinson — Arlene Foster until 3 February 2010 — Peter Robinson until 11 January 2010 — Ian Paisley until 5 June 2008
- Deputy First Minister: Martin McGuinness

Sessions
- 1st: 13 March 2007 – 20 March 2007
- 2nd: 8 May 2007 – 3 July 2007
- 3rd: 10 September 2007 – 1 July 2008
- 4th: 15 September 2008 – 7 July 2009
- 5th: 14 September 2009 – 30 June 2010
- 6th: 13 September 2010 – 23 March 2011

This is a list of the members of the third Northern Ireland Assembly elected on 7 March 2007 or subsequently co-opted. The third term was the first in the Assembly's history to run to completion.

== Party strengths ==
Party		Designation	Mar 2007 election	Mar 2011 end
●	Democratic Unionist Party	Unionist	36	35
●	Sinn Féin	Nationalist	28	27
●	Ulster Unionist Party	Unionist	18	16
●	Social Democratic and Labour Party	Nationalist	16	16
●	Alliance Party of Northern Ireland (Note: Alliance joined the Executive on 12 April 2010, administering the Department of Justice with cross-community support.)	Other	7	7
	Progressive Unionist Party	Unionist	1	0
	Green Party in Northern Ireland	Other	1	1
	Independent	Nationalist	0	1
	Independent	Other	1	1
	Independent	Unionist	0	3
	Speaker (Note: The MLA elected Speaker by the Assembly relinquishes party affiliation while in post.)	None	0	1
Total			108	
● = Northern Ireland Executive

=== Graphical representation ===
At election, 7 Mar 2007

8 May to 29 Nov 2007

3 Jan 2011 to end

This is not the actual seating plan.

== MLAs by party ==
This is a list of MLAs elected to the Northern Ireland Assembly in the 2007 Northern Ireland Assembly election, sorted by party.

Party	Name	Constituency
Democratic Unionist Party (35)	Sydney Anderson †	Upper Bann
Democratic Unionist Party (35)	Jonathan Bell †	Strangford
Democratic Unionist Party (35)	Allan Bresland	West Tyrone
Democratic Unionist Party (35)	Wallace Browne	Belfast East
Democratic Unionist Party (35)	Thomas Buchanan	West Tyrone
Democratic Unionist Party (35)	Gregory Campbell	East Londonderry
Democratic Unionist Party (35)	Trevor Clarke	South Antrim
Democratic Unionist Party (35)	Jonathan Craig	Lagan Valley
Democratic Unionist Party (35)	Alex Easton	North Down
Democratic Unionist Party (35)	Arlene Foster	Fermanagh and South Tyrone
Democratic Unionist Party (35)	Paul Frew †	North Antrim
Democratic Unionist Party (35)	Simpson Gibson †	Strangford
Democratic Unionist Party (35)	Paul Girvan †	South Antrim
Democratic Unionist Party (35)	Paul Givan †	Lagan Valley
Democratic Unionist Party (35)	Simon Hamilton	Strangford
Democratic Unionist Party (35)	David Hilditch	East Antrim
Democratic Unionist Party (35)	William Humphrey †	Belfast North
Democratic Unionist Party (35)	William Irwin	Newry and Armagh
Democratic Unionist Party (35)	Nelson McCausland	Belfast North
Democratic Unionist Party (35)	Ian McCrea	Mid Ulster
Democratic Unionist Party (35)	Michelle McIlveen	Strangford
Democratic Unionist Party (35)	Adrian McQuillan	East Londonderry
Democratic Unionist Party (35)	Maurice Morrow	Fermanagh and South Tyrone
Democratic Unionist Party (35)	Stephen Moutray	Upper Bann
Democratic Unionist Party (35)	Robin Newton	Belfast East
Democratic Unionist Party (35)	Ian Paisley	North Antrim
Democratic Unionist Party (35)	Edwin Poots	Lagan Valley
Democratic Unionist Party (35)	George Robinson	East Londonderry
Democratic Unionist Party (35)	Peter Robinson	Belfast East
Democratic Unionist Party (35)	Alastair Ross †	East Antrim
Democratic Unionist Party (35)	Jimmy Spratt	Belfast South
Democratic Unionist Party (35)	Mervyn Storey	North Antrim
Democratic Unionist Party (35)	Peter Weir	North Down
Democratic Unionist Party (35)	Jim Wells	South Down
Democratic Unionist Party (35)	Sammy Wilson	East Antrim
Sinn Féin (27)	Martina Anderson	Foyle
Sinn Féin (27)	Cathal Boylan	Newry and Armagh
Sinn Féin (27)	Mickey Brady	Newry and Armagh
Sinn Féin (27)	Paul Butler	Lagan Valley
Sinn Féin (27)	Carál Ní Chuilín	Belfast North
Sinn Féin (27)	Willie Clarke	South Down
Sinn Féin (27)	Pat Doherty	West Tyrone
Sinn Féin (27)	Michelle Gildernew	Fermanagh and South Tyrone
Sinn Féin (27)	Gerry Kelly	Belfast North
Sinn Féin (27)	Billy Leonard †	East Londonderry
Sinn Féin (27)	Alex Maskey	Belfast South
Sinn Féin (27)	Paul Maskey	Belfast West
Sinn Féin (27)	Fra McCann	Belfast West
Sinn Féin (27)	Jennifer McCann	Belfast West
Sinn Féin (27)	Raymond McCartney	Foyle
Sinn Féin (27)	Barry McElduff	West Tyrone
Sinn Féin (27)	Claire McGill	West Tyrone
Sinn Féin (27)	Martin McGuinness	Mid Ulster
Sinn Féin (27)	Daithí McKay	North Antrim
Sinn Féin (27)	Mitchel McLaughlin	South Antrim
Sinn Féin (27)	Francie Molloy	Mid Ulster
Sinn Féin (27)	Conor Murphy	Newry and Armagh
Sinn Féin (27)	John O'Dowd	Upper Bann
Sinn Féin (27)	Michelle O'Neill	Mid Ulster
Sinn Féin (27)	Sue Ramsey	Belfast West
Sinn Féin (27)	Caitríona Ruane	South Down
Sinn Féin (27)	Pat Sheehan †	Belfast West
Ulster Unionist Party (16)	Billy Armstrong	Mid Ulster
Ulster Unionist Party (16)	Roy Beggs Jr	East Antrim
Ulster Unionist Party (16)	Danny Kinahan †	South Antrim
Ulster Unionist Party (16)	Fred Cobain	Belfast North
Ulster Unionist Party (16)	Robert Coulter	North Antrim
Ulster Unionist Party (16)	Leslie Cree	North Down
Ulster Unionist Party (16)	Tom Elliott	Fermanagh and South Tyrone
Ulster Unionist Party (16)	Reg Empey	Belfast East
Ulster Unionist Party (16)	Sam Gardiner	Upper Bann
Ulster Unionist Party (16)	Danny Kennedy	Newry and Armagh
Ulster Unionist Party (16)	John McCallister	South Down
Ulster Unionist Party (16)	Basil McCrea	Lagan Valley
Ulster Unionist Party (16)	Michael McGimpsey	Belfast South
Ulster Unionist Party (16)	David McNarry	Strangford
Ulster Unionist Party (16)	Ken Robinson	East Antrim
Ulster Unionist Party (16)	George Savage	Upper Bann
Social Democratic and Labour Party (16)	Alex Attwood	Belfast West
Social Democratic and Labour Party (16)	Dominic Bradley	Newry and Armagh
Social Democratic and Labour Party (16)	Mary Bradley	Foyle
Social Democratic and Labour Party (16)	P. J. Bradley	South Down
Social Democratic and Labour Party (16)	Thomas Burns	South Antrim
Social Democratic and Labour Party (16)	John Dallat	East Londonderry
Social Democratic and Labour Party (16)	Pól Callaghan †	Foyle
Social Democratic and Labour Party (16)	Tommy Gallagher	Fermanagh and South Tyrone
Social Democratic and Labour Party (16)	Conall McDevitt †	Belfast South
Social Democratic and Labour Party (16)	Dolores Kelly	Upper Bann
Social Democratic and Labour Party (16)	Alban Maginness	Belfast North
Social Democratic and Labour Party (16)	Alasdair McDonnell	Belfast South
Social Democratic and Labour Party (16)	Patsy McGlone	Mid Ulster
Social Democratic and Labour Party (16)	Declan O'Loan	North Antrim
Social Democratic and Labour Party (16)	Pat Ramsey	Foyle
Social Democratic and Labour Party (16)	Margaret Ritchie	South Down
Alliance Party of Northern Ireland (7)	Stephen Farry	North Down
Alliance Party of Northern Ireland (7)	David Ford	South Antrim
Alliance Party of Northern Ireland (7)	Anna Lo	Belfast South
Alliance Party of Northern Ireland (7)	Chris Lyttle †	Belfast East
Alliance Party of Northern Ireland (7)	Trevor Lunn	Lagan Valley
Alliance Party of Northern Ireland (7)	Kieran McCarthy	Strangford
Alliance Party of Northern Ireland (7)	Sean Neeson	East Antrim
Green Party of Northern Ireland (1)	Brian Wilson	North Down
Independent (1)	Kieran Deeny	West Tyrone
Independent Unionist (3)	Dawn Purvis ‡	Belfast East
Independent Unionist (3)	David McClarty ‡	East Londonderry
Independent Unionist (3)	Alan McFarland ‡	North Down
Independent Nationalist (1)	Gerry McHugh ‡	Fermanagh and South Tyrone
Speaker (1)	William Hay ‡	Foyle

† Co-opted to replace an elected MLA

‡ Changed affiliation during the term

== MLAs by constituency ==
The list is given in alphabetical order by constituency.

Members of the 3rd Northern Ireland Assembly
Constituency	Name	Party
Belfast East	Wallace Browne	Democratic Unionist Party
Belfast East	Reg Empey	Ulster Unionist Party
Belfast East	Naomi Long	Alliance Party of Northern Ireland
Belfast East	Robin Newton	Democratic Unionist Party
Belfast East	Dawn Purvis ‡	Independent Unionist
Belfast East	Peter Robinson	Democratic Unionist Party
Belfast North	Fred Cobain	Ulster Unionist Party
Belfast North	William Humphrey †	Democratic Unionist Party
Belfast North	Gerry Kelly	Sinn Féin
Belfast North	Nelson McCausland	Democratic Unionist Party
Belfast North	Alban Maginness	Social Democratic and Labour Party
Belfast North	Carál Ní Chuilín	Sinn Féin
Belfast South	Anna Lo	Alliance Party of Northern Ireland
Belfast South	Alex Maskey	Sinn Féin
Belfast South	Conall McDevitt †	Social Democratic and Labour Party
Belfast South	Alasdair McDonnell	Social Democratic and Labour Party
Belfast South	Michael McGimpsey	Ulster Unionist Party
Belfast South	Jimmy Spratt	Democratic Unionist Party
Belfast West	Alex Attwood	Social Democratic and Labour Party
Belfast West	Fra McCann	Sinn Féin
Belfast West	Jennifer McCann	Sinn Féin
Belfast West	Paul Maskey	Sinn Féin
Belfast West	Sue Ramsey	Sinn Féin
Belfast West	Pat Sheehan †	Sinn Féin
East Antrim	Roy Beggs, Jr.	Ulster Unionist Party
East Antrim	Sean Neeson	Alliance Party of Northern Ireland
East Antrim	David Hilditch	Democratic Unionist Party
East Antrim	Alastair Ross †	Democratic Unionist Party
East Antrim	Ken Robinson	Sinn Féin
East Antrim	Sammy Wilson	Democratic Unionist Party
East Londonderry	Gregory Campbell	Democratic Unionist Party
East Londonderry	John Dallat	Social Democratic and Labour Party
East Londonderry	Billy Leonard †	Sinn Féin
East Londonderry	David McClarty ‡	Independent Unionist
East Londonderry	Adrian McQuillan	Democratic Unionist Party
East Londonderry	George Robinson	Democratic Unionist Party
Fermanagh and South Tyrone	Tom Elliott	Ulster Unionist Party
Fermanagh and South Tyrone	Arlene Foster	Democratic Unionist Party
Fermanagh and South Tyrone	Tommy Gallagher	Social Democratic and Labour Party
Fermanagh and South Tyrone	Michelle Gildernew	Sinn Féin
Fermanagh and South Tyrone	Gerry McHugh ‡	Independent Nationalist
Fermanagh and South Tyrone	Maurice Morrow	Democratic Unionist Party
Foyle	Martina Anderson	Sinn Féín
Foyle	Mary Bradley	Social Democratic and Labour Party
Foyle	Pól Callaghan †	Social Democratic and Labour Party
Foyle	William Hay ‡	Speaker
Foyle	Raymond McCartney	Sinn Féín
Foyle	Pat Ramsey	Social Democratic and Labour Party
Lagan Valley	Paul Butler	Sinn Féin
Lagan Valley	Jonathan Craig	Democratic Unionist Party
Lagan Valley	Paul Givan †	Democratic Unionist Party
Lagan Valley	Trevor Lunn	Alliance Party of Northern Ireland
Lagan Valley	Basil McCrea	Ulster Unionist Party
Lagan Valley	Edwin Poots	Democratic Unionist Party
Mid Ulster	Billy Armstrong	Ulster Unionist Party
Mid Ulster	Ian McCrea	Democratic Unionist Party
Mid Ulster	Patsy McGlone	Social Democratic and Labour Party
Mid Ulster	Martin McGuinness	Sinn Féin
Mid Ulster	Francie Molloy	Sinn Féin
Mid Ulster	Michelle O'Neill	Sinn Féin
Newry and Armagh	Cathal Boylan	Sinn Féin
Newry and Armagh	Mickey Brady	Sinn Féin
Newry and Armagh	Dominic Bradley	Social Democratic and Labour Party
Newry and Armagh	William Irwin	Democratic Unionist Party
Newry and Armagh	Danny Kennedy	Ulster Unionist Party
Newry and Armagh	Conor Murphy	Sinn Féin
North Antrim	Robert Coulter	Ulster Unionist Party
North Antrim	Paul Frew †	Democratic Unionist Party
North Antrim	Daithí McKay	Sinn Féin
North Antrim	Declan O'Loan	Social Democratic and Labour Party
North Antrim	Ian Paisley	Democratic Unionist Party
North Antrim	Mervyn Storey	Democratic Unionist Party
North Down	Leslie Cree	Ulster Unionist Party
North Down	Alex Easton	Democratic Unionist Party
North Down	Stephen Farry	Alliance Party of Northern Ireland
North Down	Alan McFarland ‡	Independent Unionist
North Down	Peter Weir	Democratic Unionist Party
North Down	Brian Wilson	Green Party in Northern Ireland
South Antrim	Trevor Clarke	Democratic Unionist Party
South Antrim	David Ford	Alliance Party of Northern Ireland
South Antrim	Paul Girvan †	Democratic Unionist Party
South Antrim	Danny Kinahan †	Ulster Unionist Party
South Antrim	Thomas Burns	Social Democratic and Labour Party
South Antrim	Mitchel McLaughlin	Sinn Féin
South Down	P. J. Bradley	Social Democratic and Labour Party
South Down	Willie Clarke	Sinn Féin
South Down	John McCallister	Ulster Unionist Party
South Down	Margaret Ritchie	Social Democratic and Labour Party
South Down	Caitríona Ruane	Sinn Féin
South Down	Jim Wells	Democratic Unionist Party
Strangford	Jonathan Bell †	Democratic Unionist Party
Strangford	Simon Hamilton	Democratic Unionist Party
Strangford	Kieran McCarthy	Alliance Party of Northern Ireland
Strangford	Michelle McIlveen	Democratic Unionist Party
Strangford	David McNarry	Ulster Unionist Party
Strangford	Simpson Gibson †	Democratic Unionist Party
Upper Bann	Sydney Anderson †	Democratic Unionist Party
Upper Bann	Sam Gardiner	Ulster Unionist Party
Upper Bann	Dolores Kelly	Social Democratic and Labour Party
Upper Bann	Stephen Moutray	Democratic Unionist Party
Upper Bann	John O'Dowd	Sinn Féin
Upper Bann	George Savage	Ulster Unionist Party
West Tyrone	Allan Bresland	Democratic Unionist Party
West Tyrone	Thomas Buchanan	Democratic Unionist Party
West Tyrone	Kieran Deeny	Independent
West Tyrone	Pat Doherty	Sinn Féin
West Tyrone	Claire McGill	Sinn Féin
West Tyrone	Barry McElduff	Sinn Féin

† Co-opted to replace an elected MLA ‡ Changed affiliation during the term

== Changes since the election ==
=== † Co-options ===
Date co-opted	Constituency	Party	Outgoing	Co-optee	Reason
14 May 2007	East Antrim	DUP	George Dawson	Alastair Ross	George Dawson died.
9 June 2009	South Antrim	UUP	David Burnside	Danny Kinahan	David Burnside resigned.
7 January 2010	East Londonderry	Sinn Féin	Francie Brolly	Billy Leonard	Francie Brolly resigned.
21 January 2010	Belfast South	SDLP	Carmel Hanna	Conall McDevitt	Carmel Hanna resigned.
25 January 2010	Strangford	DUP	Iris Robinson	Jonathan Bell	Iris Robinson resigned.
10 June 2010	Lagan Valley	DUP	Jeffrey Donaldson	Paul Givan	Jeffrey Donaldson resigned to concentrate on his role as a Member of Parliament.
21 June 2010	North Antrim	DUP	Ian Paisley Jr	Paul Frew	Ian Paisley Jr was elected as Member of Parliament for North Antrim in the 2010 general election.
1 July 2010	Upper Bann	DUP	David Simpson	Sydney Anderson	David Simpson was elected as Member of Parliament for Upper Bann in the 2010 general election.
1 July 2010	South Antrim	DUP	William McCrea	Paul Girvan	William McCrea resigned to concentrate on his role as a Member of Parliament.
5 July 2010	Belfast East	Alliance	Naomi Long	Chris Lyttle	Naomi Long was elected as Member of Parliament for Belfast East in the 2010 general election.
2 August 2010	Strangford	DUP	Jim Shannon	Simpson Gibson	Jim Shannon was elected as Member of Parliament for Strangford in the 2010 general election.
10 September 2010	Belfast North	DUP	Nigel Dodds	William Humphrey	Nigel Dodds resigned to concentrate on his role as a Member of Parliament.
15 November 2010	Foyle	SDLP	Mark Durkan	Pól Callaghan	Mark Durkan resigned to concentrate on his role as a Member of Parliament.
7 December 2010	Belfast West	Sinn Féin	Gerry Adams	Pat Sheehan	Gerry Adams resigned to run for Dáil Éireann.

=== ‡ Changes in affiliation ===
Date	Constituency	Name	Previous affiliation	New affiliation	Circumstance
8 May 2007	Foyle	William Hay	DUP	Speaker	William Hay elected Speaker of the Assembly at its first sitting.
29 November 2007	Fermanagh and South Tyrone	Gerry McHugh	Sinn Féin	Ind. Nationalist	Gerry McHugh resigned from Sinn Féin to become an independent nationalist. on 30 November 2009 he announced that he had joined Fianna Fáil. On 3 December 2009, it was reported that even though he was now a member of Fianna Fáil, he would remain an independent member of the Assembly.
31 March 2010	North Down	Alan McFarland	UUP	Ind. Unionist	Alan McFarland resigned from the UUP to become an independent unionist.
3 June 2010	Belfast East	Dawn Purvis	PUP	Ind. Unionist	Dawn Purvis resigned from the PUP to become an independent unionist.
3 January 2011	East Londonderry	David McClarty	UUP	Ind. Unionist	David McClarty resigned from the UUP after being deselected for the 2011 election.
