= Boyd Douglas =

Northern Irish politician (born 1950)

Member of Causeway Coast and Glens Borough Council
- In office 22 May 2014 – 2 May 2019
- Preceded by: Council created
- Succeeded by: Edgar Scott
- Constituency: Benbradagh

Member of Limavady Borough Council
- In office 21 May 1997 – 22 May 2014
- Preceded by: David Robinson
- Succeeded by: Council abolished
- Constituency: Benbradagh

Member of the Northern Ireland Assembly for East Londonderry
- In office 25 June 1998 – 26 November 2003
- Preceded by: New Creation
- Succeeded by: Norman Hillis

Personal details
- Born: 13 July 1950 (age 75) Dungiven, Northern Ireland
- Party: Traditional Unionist Voice (2011 - present); Ulster Unionist Party (until 1997)
- Other political affiliations: Independent Unionist (1998 - 2011); United Unionist Coalition (1998 - 2011)

Albert Boyd Douglas, known as Boyd Douglas (born 13 July 1950) is a Traditional Unionist Voice (TUV) politician who was a Causeway Coast and Glens Borough Councillor for the Benbradagh DEA from 2014 to 2019. Douglas previously served as an Independent Unionist Member of the Northern Ireland Assembly (MLA) for East Londonderry from 1998 to 2003.

== Career ==
The son of William Douglas (Northern Ireland politician), he attended Strabane Agriculture College before working as a farmer. At the 1997 local elections, Douglas was elected onto Limavady Borough Council for the Benbradagh District. He was elected to the council as an Ulster Unionist Party (UUP) member, but soon resigned in opposition to the Good Friday Agreement.

Douglas was elected to the Northern Ireland Assembly in 1998 as an independent Unionist representing East Londonderry. With two other anti-agreement Unionists, he formed the United Unionist Coalition. He retained his seat on the council in 2001, but lost his Assembly seat, along with all the other Coalition MLAs, in 2003. In 2005, he was able to top the poll in his seat in Limavady.

Douglas subsequently joined Traditional Unionist Voice, and contested East Londonderry seat for the party at the 2011 Assembly election, in which he came 10th out of the 12 candidates and was not elected to a seat. In reference to his decision to run, Douglas said: "Though public service has been part of my life and upbringing, returning to Stormont has not been a burning ambition. But while I’ve watched the past 4 years of failure and deadlock, with virtually nothing done for East Londonderry, I’ve concluded it requires us all, myself included, to try and make things better."

He was also re-elected onto Limavady Borough Council on the Council election that same day. Douglas was later elected on the newly-formed Causeway Coast and Glens Borough Council at the 2014 local elections, again representing Benbradagh. He was one of three TUV representatives to be elected to the council in that election. At the 2019 local elections, however, Douglas lost his seat to the Democratic Unionist Party (DUP) candidate.

Northern Ireland Assembly
New assembly	MLA for East Londonderry; 1998–2003	Succeeded by Norman Hillis
