= Denis Watson (politician) =

Leader of the United Unionist Coalition
- In office 1998–2012
- Preceded by: Office created
- Succeeded by: Office abolished

Member of the Northern Ireland Assembly for Upper Bann
- In office 25 June 1998 – 26 November 2003
- Preceded by: New Creation
- Succeeded by: Stephen Moutray

Personal details
- Party: Democratic Unionist Party (2000 - present); Independent Unionist (1998 - 2000)
- Other political affiliations: United Unionist Coalition (1998 - 2012)
- Spouse: Gail
- Profession: Financial Consultant

Denis Watson is a former Northern Irish unionist politician who was a Member of the Northern Ireland Assembly (MLA) for Upper Bann from 1998 to 2003.

Watson worked as a financial consultant and became the Grand Master of the County Armagh Orange Lodge. He was elected to the Northern Ireland Assembly in 1998 as an independent Unionist representing Upper Bann. With two other anti-agreement Unionists, he formed the United Unionist Coalition, and was registered as its leader.

In 2000, Watson joined the Democratic Unionist Party (DUP), but as late as 2006 he remains the officially registered leader of the United Unionist Coalition. In 2001, he failed to be elected as a DUP candidate for Craigavon Borough Council. He also failed to retain his Assembly seat in 2003. As of November 2012 he remains County Grand Master of County Armagh.

Northern Ireland Assembly
New assembly	MLA for Upper Bann; 1998–2003	Succeeded by Stephen Moutray
