= Cedric Wilson =

Northern Irish politician (born 1948)

Leader of the Northern Ireland Unionist Party
- In office January 1999 – 10 March 2008
- Deputy: Patrick Roche
- Preceded by: Party created
- Succeeded by: Party dissolved

Member of the Northern Ireland Assembly for Strangford
- In office 25 June 1998 – 26 November 2003
- Preceded by: New Creation
- Succeeded by: George Ennis

Member of the Northern Ireland Forum
- In office 30 May 1996 – 25 April 1998
- Constituency: Top-up list

Member of Castlereagh Borough Council
- In office 15 May 1985 – 17 May 1989
- Preceded by: District created
- Succeeded by: Joyce Boyd
- Constituency: Castlereagh Central
- In office 20 May 1981 – 15 May 1985
- Preceded by: Elizabeth Rea
- Succeeded by: District abolished
- Constituency: Castlereagh Area C

Personal details
- Born: 6 June 1948 (age 78) Belfast, Northern Ireland, UK
- Party: NI Unionist Party (1999 - 2008); UK Unionist Party (1996 -1998); DUP (Pre 1996)

Cedric Wilson (born 6 June 1948) is a former Northern Irish unionist politician who was leader of the Northern Ireland Unionist Party (NIUP) from 1999 to 2008, and a Member of the Legislative Assembly (MLA) for Strangford from 1998 to 2003.

He founded the NIUP after resigning from the UK Unionist Party (UKUP), in response to party leader Robert McCartney proposal to withdraw his MLAs from the Assembly, in the event of the IRA not decommissioning their weapons.

== Career ==
Born in Belfast, Wilson became the director of a private nursing home. In 1981, he was elected to Castlereagh Borough Council for the Democratic Unionist Party, a post he held until 1989. During this time, he became known for his role in campaigning against the Anglo-Irish Agreement.

At the 1982 Northern Ireland Assembly election, Wilson stood unsuccessfully in Belfast South.

In 1996, he joined the UK Unionist Party (UKUP), and was elected to the Northern Ireland Forum under the top-up system in 1996. When the Forum was replaced by the Northern Ireland Assembly, Wilson won a seat in Strangford outright, initially placing third out of twenty-two candidates.

In 1999, Wilson and three of the four other UKUP Assembly members left the party to form the Northern Ireland Unionist Party (NIUP). They argued that they should not quit their Assembly seats should Sinn Féin take up its seats in the without prior Provisional Irish Republican Army decommissioning of weapons. Wilson became the party leader, and in the 2001 UK general election, he contested the Strangford parliamentary seat, but came bottom of the poll, with only 1.9% of the vote.

This poor showing was reflected in the 2003 Assembly election, when Wilson initially placed only tenth out of thirteen candidates, and all the NIUP members lost their seats.

Wilson remained leader of the NIUP, but the party is currently inactive. Wilson stood as an independent candidate in the Strangford constituency at the 2007 Assembly election where he polled 305 votes (0.8%), thus finishing last out of the fifteen candidates.

Northern Ireland Forum
New forum	Regional Member; 1996–1998	Forum dissolved
Northern Ireland Assembly
New assembly	MLA for Strangford; 1998–2003	Succeeded by George Ennis
