= Independent Unionist =

Political label in the United Kingdom

Independent Unionist is a label sometimes used by candidates in British elections to indicate their support for British unionism. It is most popularly associated with candidates in elections for the Northern Ireland Assembly. Such candidates supported the positions of Unionism in Northern Ireland but, for various reasons, could not reconcile to themselves to the Ulster Unionist Party or other groups. It was also used by Unionists in what became the Irish Free State, as they were unionists, but not in Ulster. The label was also used in Scotland, demonstrating an association with ideology of the Unionist Party, the predecessor to the modern Scottish Conservative and Unionist Party.

In the 1938 Northern Ireland general election, Tommy Henderson and five defeated candidates stood for the Independent Unionist Association, which was distinct from other Independent Unionists.

== Notable users of the affiliation ==
=== Northern Ireland ===
- Fraser Agnew, Boyd Douglas and Denis Watson used the title before forming the United Unionist Coalition.
- Pauline Armitage MLA for Londonderry East, 1998-2003 briefly used the designation before joining the UK Unionist Party.
- William Bleakes used the term, newly prohibited in elections, following his departure from the Conservatives 1998–2001. The legal change meant he stood and branded himself from 2001 simply independent.
- James Brown contested the 1945 Northern Ireland general election under this label.
- Ivan Davis ran as independent Unionist after failing to secure selection as UUP candidature for the 2003 Assembly election. He has subsequently returned to the UUP.
- Dorothy Dunlop, Assembly member for East Belfast 1982-1986 campaigned under this label before joining the Conservative Party.
- Alex Easton left the DUP in 2021, but was re-elected in the 2022 Northern Ireland Assembly election as an independent unionist, and to the House of Commons in 2024 as an independent.
- George Forrest won the 1956 Mid Ulster by-election as an independent Unionist before switching to the Ulster Unionist Party.
- James Woods Gyle, a member of both houses of the Parliament of Northern Ireland and a contemporary of Henderson, was an independent Unionist throughout his political career.
- Lloyd Hall-Thompson would later hold the same seat, Belfast Clifton, similarly.
- George Hanna was an early example, representing East Antrim in the British House of Commons from 1919.
- Tommy Henderson represented Belfast Shankill from 1929 to 1953 as an independent Unionist.
- Sylvia Hermon had been elected as an MP in 2001 for the Ulster Unionist Party. In 2010, she announced her intention not to seek the nomination as the Ulster Conservatives and Unionists candidate for North Down in the 2010 Westminster election, standing as an independent unionist. She was re-elected to the House of Commons under this designation until her retirement in 2019.
- Roger Hutchinson sat as such following his expulsion from the third party he stood with, the Northern Ireland Unionist Party, in 2000.
- Ken Maginnis, Baron Maginnis of Drumglass sits as an independent unionist peer in the House of Lords, since resigning from the UUP in 2012.
- David McClarty ran as an independent unionist after being de-selected by the UUP for the Northern Ireland Assembly election in 2011 in the East Londonderry constituency. He was re-elected to the Assembly under this designation and held the seat until his death in 2014.
- Bertie McConnell was elected to the NI Parliament under this banner in 1969.
- Basil McCrea and John McCallister took on the label after leaving the UUP in 2013.
- Frank Millar was elected to both the Northern Ireland Constitutional Convention and the Northern Ireland Assembly (1982) as an independent Unionist.
- Ruth Patterson, Belfast City Councillor, described herself as such following her expulsion from the Democratic Unionist Party in 2015.
- Norman Porter was elected for Belfast Clifton in the 1953 election on this ticket.
- Claire Sugden has represented East Londonderry in the Northern Ireland Assembly since her 2014 Co-Option, after the death of David McClarty. She has sat as an independent since her selection. She served as the Minister for Justice on the Northern Ireland Executive from May 2016 to January 2017.
- Hugh Smyth served in both the Northern Ireland Assembly (1973) and the Northern Ireland Constitutional Convention as an independent unionist.
- Doug Beattie took on the label after leaving the UUP in 2026, a party which he led from 2021 to 2024.

=== England ===
- Francis Bennett-Goldney won Canterbury in 1910 against a Conservative as an Independent Unionist, having strongly independent views as he opposed the growing arms race and diplomatic contest with the German Empire, acquiesced in by the other main parties.

=== Scotland ===
- Ian Smith stood unsuccessfully as such in the 1963 Kinross and Western Perthshire by-election in Scotland, which was won by the Conservative and Unionist Party leader, Prime Minister, Alec Douglas-Home.
- David Robertson in Caithness and Sutherland in 1964.

=== Southern Ireland ===
Four MPs elected to the Southern Ireland House of Commons for Dublin University at the 1921 election. They were the only MPs to attend the opening of the Parliament of Southern Ireland, as all other members, who had been elected for Sinn Féin, sat as members of the Second Dáil. All four were elected again at the 1922 Irish general election, and would each continue to serve in the Irish Free State either as Independent TDs or, in Fitzgibbon's case, as a judge.

- Ernest Alton, TD 1922–37, Senator 1938–43
- James Craig, TD 1922–33
- Gerald Fitzgibbon, TD 1922–23, Judge of the Supreme Court of Justice 1924–38
- William Thrift, TD 1922–37

==== Republic of Ireland ====
- Ian Marshall served as an independent Unionist in Seanad Éireann, from 2018 to 2020.

== See also ==
- Independent politician
- Independent Unionist Association
- Independent Conservative
- Independent Nationalist
