= United Unionist Coalition =

The United Unionist Coalition (UUC), formerly known as the United Unionist Assembly Party, was a minor unionist political formation in Northern Ireland.

== Northern Ireland Assembly ==
The UUC was formed by three members of the Northern Ireland Assembly who had been elected as "independent unionists" in 1998, and decided to form themselves into an official grouping to avail of facilities provided by the Assembly to parties. As such they were more a coalition of political expediency rather than a coherent political party. The founders of the group, which was initially called the "United Unionist Assembly Party", were Fraser Agnew, Boyd Douglas and Denis Watson (all of whom have since left the grouping).

The grouping subsequently registered with the Electoral Commission as the "United Unionist Coalition", a name recalling the anti-Sunningdale Agreement bloc of Unionist parties in the 1970s, the United Ulster Unionist Coalition.

Watson subsequently joined the Democratic Unionist Party. In the 2003 Assembly elections the UUC secured only 0.4% of first preference votes and all three UUC members lost their seats. The UUC did not contest the 2007 or 2011 Assembly elections.

== Local government ==
Following the 2005 local government elections the UUC had two elected councillors: Agnew on Newtownabbey Borough Council and Douglas on Limavady Borough Council. A mid-term defection led to the party gaining one council seat in Limavady.

In January 2011 Agnew left the UUC, returning to the Ulster Unionist Party. Douglas joined Traditional Unionist Voice prior to the May 2011 Council elections (in which he held his seat). No candidate was elected on a UUC ticket.

As of April 2012, the UUC has no elected representatives and is not registered with the Electoral Commission.
