= Kieran Deeny =

Kieran Deeny MLA

Member of the Northern Ireland Assembly for West Tyrone
- In office 26 November 2003 – 2011
- Preceded by: Joe Byrne
- Succeeded by: Joe Byrne

Personal details
- Born: 12 October 1954 (age 71) Downpatrick, Northern Ireland
- Party: Independent
- Education: University College Dublin

Kieran Deeny (born 12 October 1954) is a Northern Irish politician, footballer, and doctor.

Deeny was a Designated Other Member of the Northern Ireland Assembly for West Tyrone (MLA) from 2003 to 2011, having run on a single issue ticket of retaining the Tyrone County Hospital in Omagh.

== Early life ==
Deeny was born in Downpatrick where he attended St. Patrick's Boy's Primary School and then St Patrick's Grammar School. During this time he regularly participated in several sports, representing Ulster Schools at table tennis, representing Down in the Gaelic Athletic Association and playing football in both the Irish League and League of Ireland in the early 1970s.

He studied at University College Dublin and worked as a general practitioner in County Tyrone from the mid-1980s onwards. From 2000 he also served as Chairman of Omagh and District G.P. Association and took a prominent role in the campaign to keep full medical provision at the Tyrone County Hospital.

== Political career ==
In the 2003 Northern Ireland assembly elections Deeny ran as an independent candidate in West Tyrone on the sole issue of retaining the hospital and generated one of the biggest shocks of that election when he topped the poll and took a seat from the Social Democratic and Labour Party. However, the continued suspension of the Assembly meant that Deeny was not able to directly influence decisions about the future of the hospital.

In the 2005 general election Deeny stood for the Westminster seat, campaigning heavily against sitting MP Pat Doherty's abstentionism and arguing that this denied the seat a voice, and received a lot of backing from many activists and supporters of both Nationalist and Unionist political parties, though all the major parties ran candidates. Deeny received over 11,000 votes and placed second in the election to Pat Doherty.

In the 2007 Assembly elections Deeny was elected on the seventh count with 3,776 first preference votes. His campaign was again largely based on a single issue – the impending closure of the Sion Mills branch surgery.

He sat with the Alliance Party and the Green Party's Brian Wilson as "United Community MLAs".

On 16 May 2007, Deeny changed his status as an Independent to become party leader and a member of the Independent Health Coalition in the Assembly.

Kieran was a member of the Health, Social Services and Public Safety Committee in the Assembly.

He did not contest the 2011 Assembly election.

== See also ==
Other medical doctors & health care workers elected on similar platform in Ireland and the UK:

- Paudge Connolly – elected to the Dáil .
- Richard Taylor – elected to the UK Parliament
- Jean Turner – elected to the Scottish Parliament
- Liam Twomey – elected to the Dáil as an Independent (joined Fine Gael.

Northern Ireland Assembly
Preceded by Joe Byrne	MLA for West Tyrone; 2003–2011	Succeeded by Joe Byrne
