= Northern Ireland Unionist Party =

Defunct Northern Irish political party (1999 to 2008)

- Leader: Cedric Wilson
- Deputy leader: Patrick Roche
- Founded: 1999
- Dissolved: 2008
- Split from: UK Unionist Party
- Headquarters: Newtownabbey
- Ideology: Ulster unionism Anti-Belfast Agreement
- Political position: Right-wing to Far-right
- Colours: Red, White, Blue

Website
- None

The Northern Ireland Unionist Party (NIUP) was a small unionist political party in Northern Ireland that campaigned against the Belfast Agreement.

== History ==
It was formed in January 1999 as a splinter party from the UK Unionist Party (UKUP). This split was caused by disagreement between the five UKUP members of the Northern Ireland Assembly. Four of the members disagreed with UKUP leader Robert McCartney's policy of resigning from the Assembly should Sinn Féin become part of the power-sharing executive. Cedric Wilson, Patrick Roche, Norman Boyd and Roger Hutchinson disagreed with McCartney, wanting to remain in the Assembly to challenge unionists in favour of the Belfast Agreement. McCartney disciplined these members in their absence and, in response, they left the UKUP and formed the NIUP. Led by Wilson, the new party argued that it had the support of the grassroots membership of the UKUP, but McCartney disputed this.

Subsequently, Hutchinson left the NIUP on 30 November 1999, sitting as an independent Unionist for a period before joining the Democratic Unionist Party (DUP). He then left the DUP and unsuccessfully contested the 2003 Assembly Election as an independent Unionist.

The NIUP opposed the Belfast Agreement and the reformation of the Royal Ulster Constabulary to the Police Service Northern Ireland. They described their position as "principled unionism."

In its first electoral test, the party polled very poorly in the 2001 General Election and in local elections held on the same day, winning no Westminster or council seats. In the 2003 Assembly Election, the NIUP won no seats at all.

The NIUP consistently had a low level of support and mainly contested the constituencies represented by its four Assembly members. In 2001, it received 1,794 votes in the general election and 1,818 votes in the local elections. This fell to 1,350 in the 2003 Assembly election. Its share of the vote across Northern Ireland was around 0.2% in each case.

The party's submission of accounts for 2004 stated that the party was "inactive" during this period and there is no evidence of subsequent activity. Wilson stood as an independent candidate in the Strangford constituency at the 2007 Assembly Election where he polled 305 votes (0.8%), thus finishing last out of the fifteen candidates.

The NIUP voluntarily deregistered as a political party on 10 March 2008.

== Electoral performance ==
=== UK general elections ===
Election	Seats won	±	Votes	%
2001	0 / 18	0	1,794	0.2%

=== Northern Ireland Assembly elections ===
Election	Seats won	±	First pref. votes	%
2003	0 / 108	0	1,350	0.2%

=== Local elections ===
Election	Seats won	±	First pref. votes	%
2001	0 / 582	0	1,818	0.23%
