= Billy Armstrong (politician) =

Ulster Unionist politician in Northern Ireland (born 1943)

Member of the Northern Ireland Assembly for Mid-Ulster
- In office 25 June 1998 – 2011
- Preceded by: New Creation
- Succeeded by: Sandra Overend

Personal details
- Born: William Armstrong; 21 June 1943 (age 82) Coagh, Northern Ireland
- Party: Ulster Unionist Party
- Website: http://www.billyarmstrong.co.uk/

William Armstrong (born 21 June 1943) is an Ulster Unionist politician in Northern Ireland.

== Background ==
He served as Assembly Member for Mid Ulster from 1998 until 2011, when he was succeeded by his daughter, Sandra Overend. He was a member of the Agriculture and Rural Development Committee, the Committee for Enterprise, Trade & Industry and the Committee of the Environment. In 2005, he became the first Ulster Unionist candidate since 1983 to contest Mid Ulster in the Westminster General Election.

Armstrong served as a part-time Royal Ulster Constabulary Reserve Constable for fourteen years from 1975 until 1989.

He is a member of Brigh Presbyterian Church. He is also a member of the Loyal Orange Order, holding the position of Honorary Secretary of Chambré's Volunteers L.O.L. 171, and a member of the Royal Black Institution where he currently holds the position of Lay Chaplain of Tamlaghtmore Red Cross Temperance R.B.P. 518. He has also held the positions of Worshipful Master, Treasurer and Secretary of this preceptory.

Having first been elected in 1998, Armstrong is now one of the longest-serving members of the Northern Ireland Assembly. He currently serves as Deputy Whip of the Ulster Unionist Party Assembly Group, and is the UUP Spokesman for Social Development.

In the 1998 Assembly election Armstrong polled 9% of the popular vote, in 2003 9.7%, and in 2007 10.8%. Over the same period the UUP vote decreased from 13.93% in 1998 to 10.8% in 2007, a loss of 2,157 votes.

In September 2007 Armstrong talked about the need for Unionist Unity, stating, "I do not pretend that any merger with the DUP is likely – indeed it may not even be desirable – but I do believe that for the sake of the Unionist electorate, we should try to see if some kind of accommodation or understanding is possible." This topic was also discussed by Ulster Unionist supporter and Newsletter columnist Alex Kane.

Following the revelation that Conservative MP Derek Conway paid his son from his expenses to do no work, public interest in elected representatives' expenses mounted. It was revealed that Billy Armstrong had paid rent to his wife for his constituency office for a period up to 2007. Armstrong's office is a prefab, which stands beside his home, Prospect House near Stewartstown, County Tyrone.

Armstrong officially opened a second Constituency Office at 20 High Street, Moneymore on Friday 6 March 2009, although this office has been serving the constituents of Mid-Ulster since 8 November.

Northern Ireland Assembly
New assembly	MLA for Mid-Ulster; 1998–2011	Succeeded by Sandra Overend
