= UK Unionist Party =

Political party

- Leader: Robert McCartney
- Founded: 20 April 1996
- Dissolved: 4 September 2008
- Headquarters: Bangor, Northern Ireland
- Ideology: Unionism; Integrationism; Euroscepticism; Anti-Devolution; Anti-Belfast Agreement
- Political position: Centre-right to right-wing
- Colours: Red, white and blue

The UK Unionist Party (UKUP) was a small unionist political party in Northern Ireland from 1995 to 2008 that opposed the Good Friday Agreement. The label was first used by Robert McCartney, formerly of the Ulster Unionist Party, to contest the 1995 North Down by-election, and then constituted as a political party on 20 April 1996, to contest the elections for the Northern Ireland Forum. McCartney had previously contested the 1987 general election as an independent using the label Real Unionist.

== Ideology ==
In contrast to other unionist parties, the UK Unionist Party was an integrationist party which believed that Northern Ireland should be governed from London with no regional home rule government and parliament. The UKUP was outspoken in its opposition to the Republic of Ireland having any participative role in the governance of Northern Ireland.

It was also highly critical of the British Labour government of Tony Blair agreeing to Sinn Féin's participation in the Northern Ireland Executive prior to the Provisional IRA fully disarming. The party also opposed the re-organising of policing in Northern Ireland, which saw the Royal Ulster Constabulary (RUC) being replaced by the Police Service of Northern Ireland (PSNI).

== History ==
The party secured a particular coup in 1996 when it was joined by Conor Cruise O'Brien, a former government minister in the Republic of Ireland. O'Brien's hostility to militant Irish republicanism was well-known, and the adherence of such a prominent supporter from the Republic helped reinforce the UKUP's claims to be a non-sectarian party.

McCartney and O'Brien, along with Cedric Wilson, won seats on the 1996 Forum. The UKUP (and the Democratic Unionist Party (DUP)) refused to accept US Senator George Mitchell as chairman of the multi-party talks and tried to obstruct his work. In July 1996, the UKUP withdrew from the multi-party talks in protest at the way in which the Drumcree conflict was handled, but later re-joined them. When Sinn Féin entered the talks in September 1997, the UKUP again left them in protest, along with the DUP.

At the 1997 general election, McCartney was re-elected as the Member of Parliament for North Down. The party opposed the April 1998 Belfast Agreement and campaigned against the establishment of a Northern Ireland Assembly, in which they were unsuccessful. It did contest the election for the Assembly, however, and won five seats.

During 1998, the party suffered a significant amount of internal turmoil. O'Brien published an article in which he called for unionists to consider and embrace the idea of a United Ireland (to challenge the growth in popularity of Sinn Féin) – an idea that was anathema to most in the UKUP. He subsequently resigned from the party. In December the party split over the issue of Sinn Féin taking up its seats in the power-sharing executive without prior Provisional Irish Republican Army decommissioning of weapons. McCartney proposed that if this should happen, the five UKUP members should resign their seats in protest, but this was opposed by the other assembly members. At a party meeting at which the other four were absent, McCartney censured his Assembly colleagues over this split. The two sides both argued that they had the support of the grassroots members of the party. On 5 January 1999, all four left the UKUP to form the Northern Ireland Unionist Party (NIUP), leaving McCartney as the sole UKUP representative in the assembly.

At the 2001 general election, McCartney lost his seat in the House of Commons to the Ulster Unionist Party, which in addition to putting considerable resources into taking the seat, benefited from the withdrawal of the Alliance Party of Northern Ireland due to McCartney's opposition to the Good Friday Agreement. In the 2003 Assembly election, he was only narrowly re-elected to the Assembly. The party suffered a substantial decline in the election, holding only one seat. The NIUP also lost all of its seats.

In 2005, the UKUP did not contest any seats in the Westminster election. In the local elections, its two members of North Down Borough Council lost their seats.

In the 2007 Assembly election, the UKUP fielded candidates in thirteen of Northern Ireland's eighteen constituencies, but failed to win any seats. Leader McCartney personally stood in six constituencies and former DUP MLA George Ennis also stood on the UKUP ticket. The party stood on a platform opposing plans by the DUP to enter into devolved government with Sinn Féin after the election and on other issues including rates, water charges and education. The UKUP was seen as the main channel for DUP members disaffected with plans to share power with Sinn Féin.

Following McCartney's defeat in North Down in the 2007 Assembly elections, the UKUP was left without elected representatives at any level. McCartney announced his retirement from politics following the loss of his assembly seat in North Down to Brian Wilson of the Green Party. As of 4th September 2008, the UKUP is no longer listed as a registered party in the Northern Ireland Register of Political Parties maintained by the UK Electoral Commission.

== Electoral performance ==
=== UK general elections ===
Election	Seats won	±	Votes	%	±
1997	1 / 18	▲1	12,817	1.6%	▲1.6%
2001	0 / 18	▼1	13,509	1.7%	▲0.1%

=== Northern Ireland Forum elections ===
Election	Seats won	±	First Pref votes	%	±
1996	3 / 110	▲3	27,774	3.7%	▲3.7%

=== Northern Ireland Assembly elections ===
Election	Seats won	±	First Pref votes	%	±
1998	5 / 108	▲2	36,541	4.5%	▲0.8%
2003	1 / 108	▼4	5,700	0.8%	▼3.7%
2007	0 / 108	▼1	10,452	1.5%	▲0.7%

=== European Parliament elections ===
Election	Seats won	±	First Pref votes	%	±
1999	0 / 87	Steady	20,283	0.2%	▲0.2%

=== Local elections ===
Election	Seats won	±	First Pref votes	%	±
1997	4 / 575	▲4	2,945	0.5%	▲0.5%
2001	2 / 582	▼2	4,763	0.6%	▲0.1%
2005	0 / 582	▼2	734	0.1%	▼0.6%
