= 2003 Northern Ireland Assembly election =

- 26 November 2003

All 108 seats to the Northern Ireland Assembly
- Turnout: 63.1% ▼6.7%
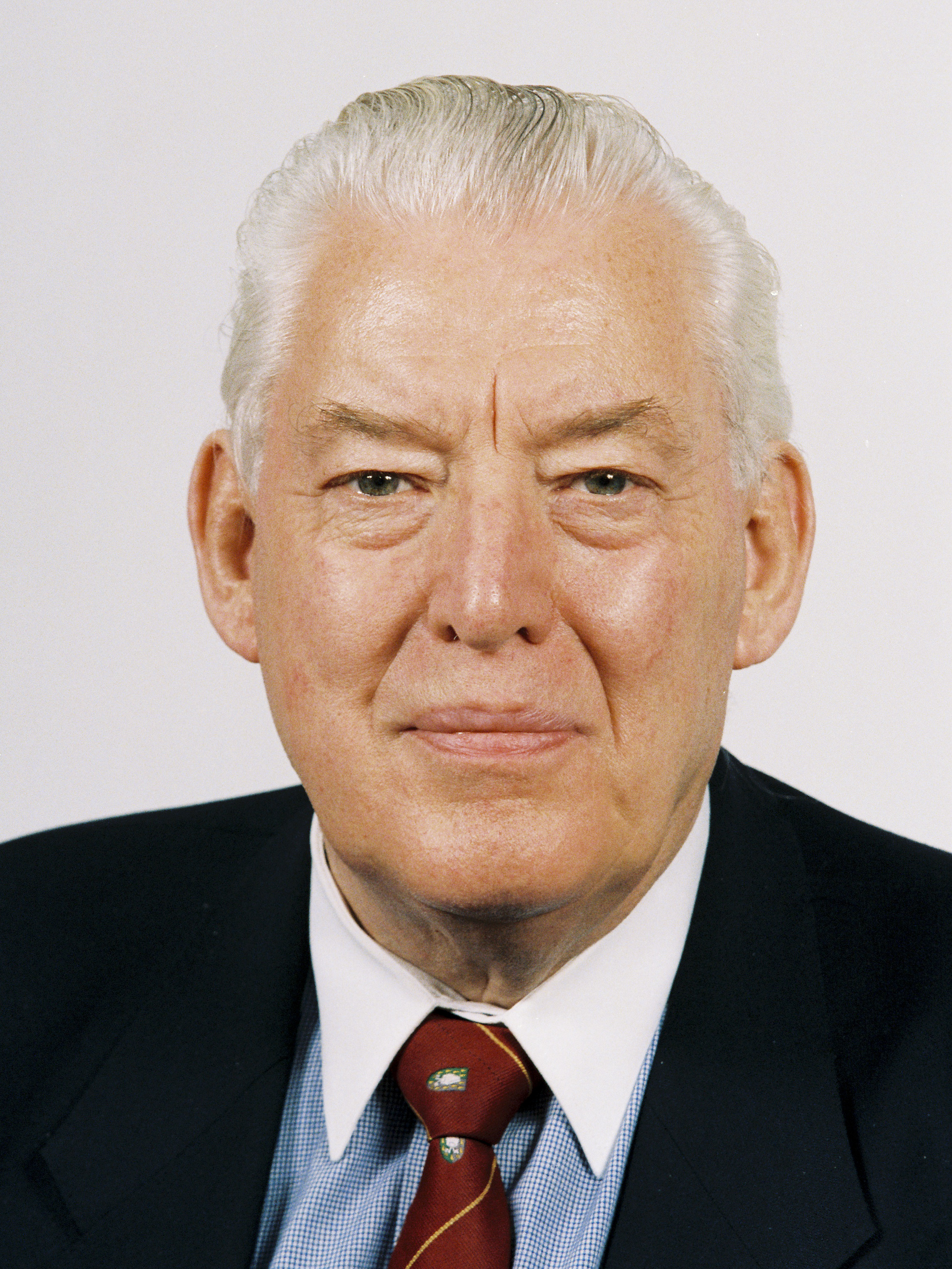

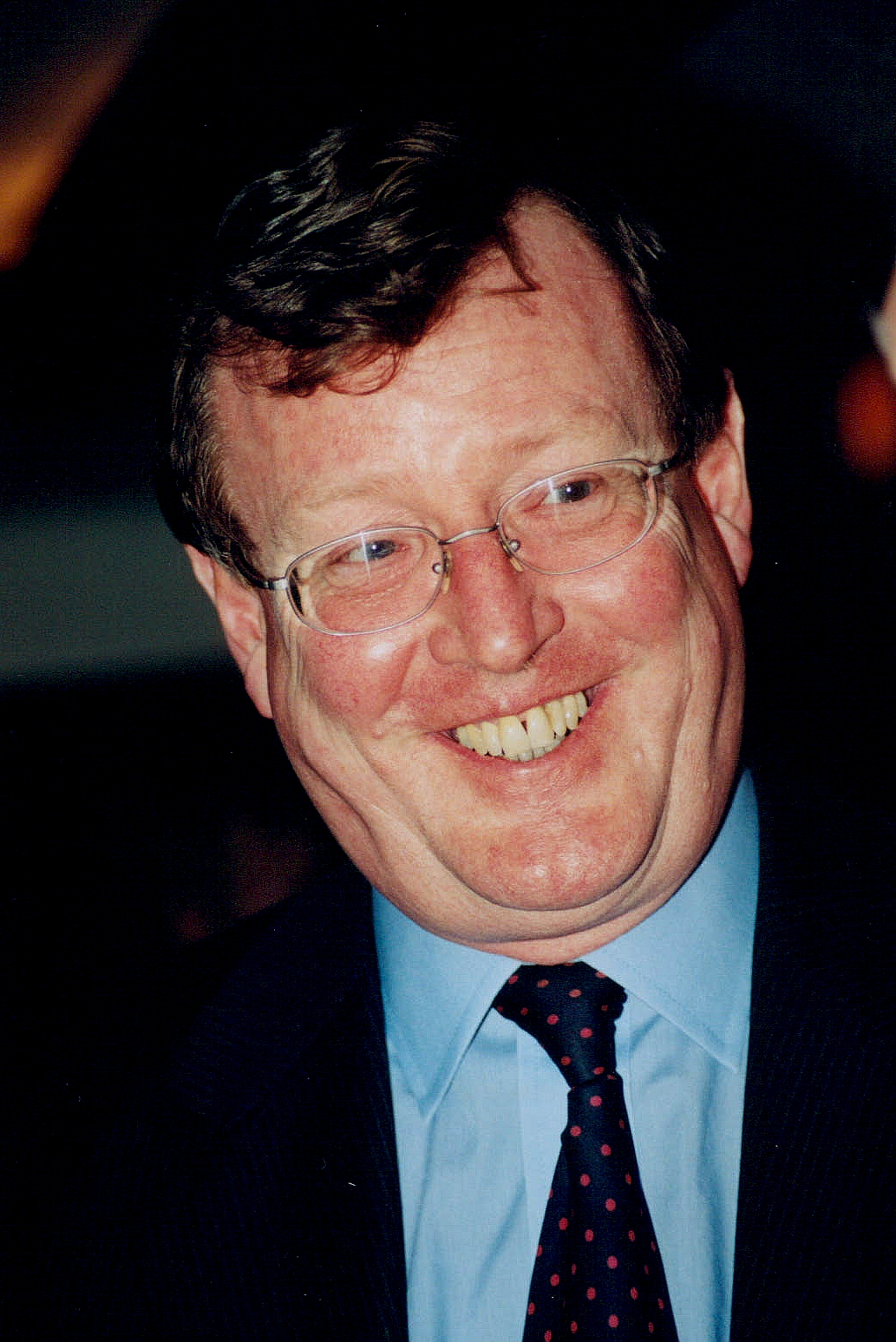

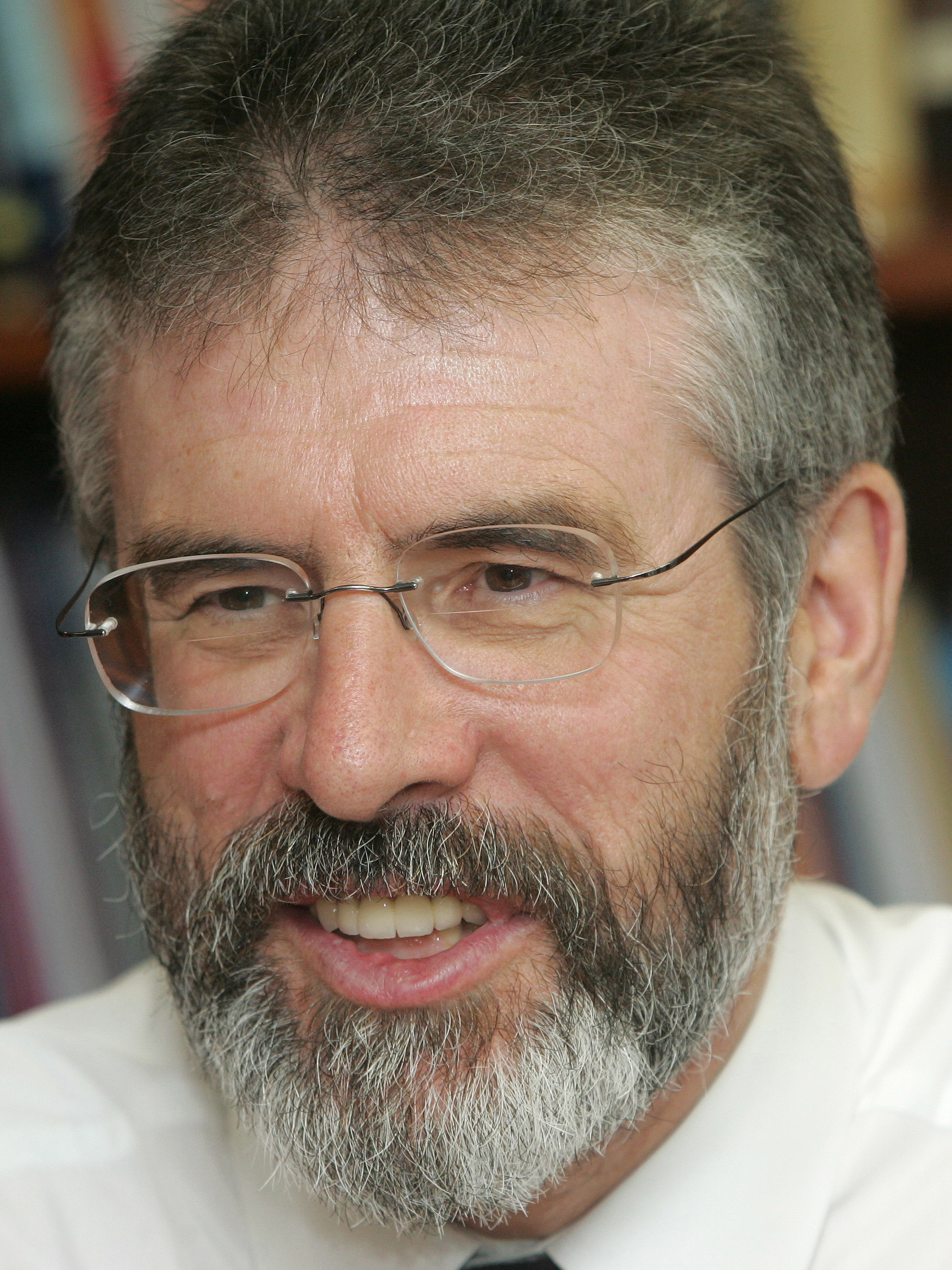

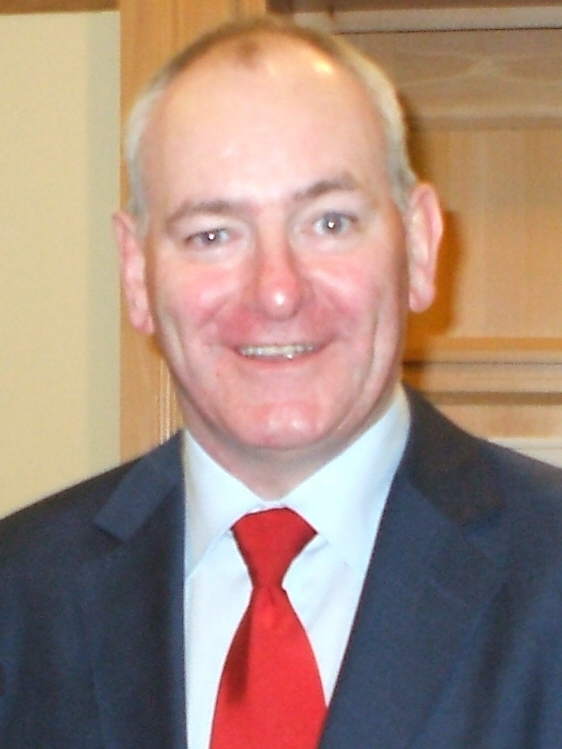

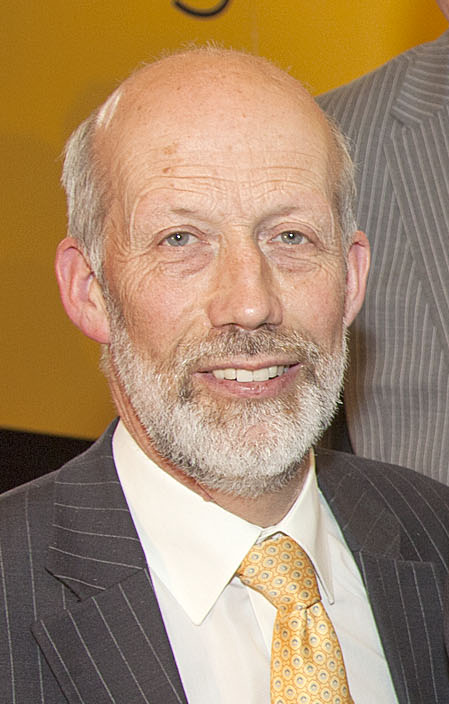
	First party	Second party	Third party
Leader	Ian Paisley	David Trimble	Gerry Adams
Party	DUP	UUP	Sinn Féin
Leader since	30 September 1971	8 September 1995	13 November 1983
Leader's seat	North Antrim	Upper Bann	Belfast West
Last election	20 seats, 18.5%	28 seats, 21.3%	18 seats, 16.7%
Seats before	20	27	18
Seats won	30	27	24
Seat change	▲10	▼1	▲6
Popular vote	177,944	156,931	162,758
Percentage	25.7%	22.7%	23.5%
Swing	▲7.2%	▲1.4%	▲6.8%
	Fourth party	Fifth party	Sixth party
Leader	Mark Durkan	David Ford	David Ervine
Party	SDLP	Alliance	PUP
Leader since	10 November 2001	6 October 2001	2002
Leader's seat	Foyle	South Antrim	Belfast East
Last election	24 seats, 22.0%	6 seats, 5.6%	2 seats, 2.6%
Seats before	23	5	2
Seats won	18	6	1
Seat change	▼6	0	▼1
Popular vote	117,547	25,372	8,032
Percentage	17.0%	3.7%	1.2%
Swing	▼5.0%	▼1.9%	▼1.4%
	Seventh party
Leader	Robert McCartney
Party	UK Unionist
Leader since	1995
Leader's seat	North Down
Last election	5 seats, 4.5%
Seats before	1
Seats won	1
Seat change	▼4
Popular vote	5,700
Percentage	0.8%
Swing	▼3.7%
- Election results. Voters elect 6 assembly members from the 18 constituencies.
First Minister before election
Suspended
First Minister after election
Suspended

The 2003 Northern Ireland Assembly election was held on Wednesday, 26 November 2003, after being suspended for just over a year. It was the second election to take place since the devolved assembly was established in 1998. Each of Northern Ireland's eighteen Westminster Parliamentary constituencies elected six members by single transferable vote, giving a total of 108 Members of the Legislative Assembly (MLAs). The election was contested by 18 parties and many independent candidates.

== Background ==
The election was originally planned for May 2003, but was delayed by Paul Murphy, the Secretary of State for Northern Ireland.

Several sitting MLAs stood under a different label to the one they had used in the 1998 election. Some had failed to be selected by their parties to stand and so stood as independents, whilst others had changed parties during the course of the assembly. Most of these realignments occurred within the unionist parties, with several defections between existing parties, and two new parties being formed – the United Unionist Coalition (formed by the three MLAs elected as independent unionists, though one later joined the DUP) and the Northern Ireland Unionist Party (formed by four of the five MLAs elected as the UK Unionist Party, though one later left them, joined the DUP for a period, then contested the election as an independent unionist).

The SDLP, which had been Northern Ireland's dominant Irish nationalist party during the 1980s and 1990s, went into this election with concerns that they could lose numerous seats to fellow nationalists Sinn Féin, who had overtaken the SDLP in terms of votes and seats at the 2001 United Kingdom general election. Commentator, Brian Feeney, said: "The SDLP has a series of baronial figures - John Hume, Seamus Mallon, Eddie McGrady - who hung on to power and didn't groom their successors early enough. They just don't have enough people on the ground in some areas of the province. Sinn Féin, by contrast, has deliberately cultivated collective leadership, bringing forward wave after wave of young, articulate, highly politicised heirs apparent, and their grassroots organisation is awesome."

== Results ==
On the unionist side, the Democratic Unionist Party (DUP) became Northern Ireland's biggest party for the first time in any election, overtaking the Ulster Unionist Party (UUP). They gained ten seats, primarily at the expense of smaller unionist parties, to become the largest party both in seats and votes, winning thirty overall. The UUP increased their vote slightly, despite slipping to third place in first preference votes, and won 27 seats, a net loss of one. Shortly after the election three Ulster Unionist MLAs, Jeffrey Donaldson, Norah Beare and Arlene Foster, quit the party and later defected to the DUP.

On the nationalist side, Sinn Féin saw a big increase in their vote, gaining six seats at the net expense of the Social Democratic and Labour Party, for a total of 24 seats.

The minor parties all saw a significant fall in their support. The Alliance Party managed to hold all six of its seats despite their vote falling by a third, the Women's Coalition, United Unionist Coalition and Northern Ireland Unionist Party were all wiped out, and the Progressive Unionist Party and UK Unionist Party won just one seat each. Neither the United Unionist Assembly Party nor the Northern Ireland Unionists won any seats.

The biggest surprise of the election came in West Tyrone with the election of the independent Kieran Deeny, a doctor campaigning on the single issue of hospital provision in Omagh.

Result by constituencies

Preferable vote.

Party	Votes	%	Seats	+/–
DUP	177,944	25.66	30	▲10
Sinn Féin	162,758	23.47	24	▲6
UUP	156,931	22.63	27	▼1
SDLP	117,547	16.95	18	▼6
Alliance	25,372	3.66	6	0
PUP	8,032	1.16	1	▼1
NI Women's Coalition	5,785	0.83	0	▼2
UK Unionist	5,700	0.82	1	▼4
United Unionist Council	2,705	0.39	–	–
Green (NI)	2,688	0.39	–	–
Socialist Environmental Alliance	2,394	0.35	–	–
Workers' Party	1,881	0.27	–	–
NI Conservatives	1,604	0.23	–	–
NI Unionist	1,350	0.19	–	–
Socialist Party	343	0.05	–	–
Vote For Yourself Rainbow Dream Ticket	124	0.02	–	–
Ulster Third Way	16	0.00	–	–
Independent	20,234	2.92	1	▲1
Total	693,408	100.00	108	–
Registered voters/turnout	1,097,526	63.05		
Source: ARK

=== Distribution of seats by constituency ===
Party affiliation of the six Assembly members returned by each constituency. The first column indicates the party of the Member of the House of Commons (MP) returned by the corresponding parliamentary constituency in the 2001 United Kingdom general election under the first-past-the-post voting method.

Party of MP, 2001	Constituency	Northern Ireland Assembly seats										
Party of MP, 2001	Constituency	Total									Gained by	Formerly held by
Party of MP, 2001	Constituency	Total	APNI	DUP	PUP	SDLP	Sinn Féin	UKU	UUP	Ind.	Gained by	Formerly held by
DUP	North Antrim	6	–	3	–	1	1	–	1	–	SF	UUP
UUP	East Antrim	6	1	3	–	–	–	–	2	–	DUP	UKU
UUP	East Antrim	6	1	3	–	–	–	–	2	–	DUP	SDLP
UUP	South Antrim	6	1	2	–	1	–	–	2	–	DUP	UKU
DUP	Belfast North	6	–	2	–	1	2	–	1	–	DUP	Ind. U.
DUP	Belfast North	6	–	2	–	1	2	–	1	–	SF	PUP
Sinn Féin	Belfast West	6	–	1	–	1	4	–	–	–	DUP	SDLP
UUP	Belfast South	6	–	1	–	2	1	–	2	–	SF	NIWC
DUP	Belfast East	6	1	2	1	–	–	–	2	–	–	–
UUP	North Down	6	1	2	–	–	–	1	2	–	DUP	UUP
UUP	North Down	6	1	2	–	–	–	1	2	–	DUP	NIWC
DUP	Strangford	6	1	3	–	–	–	–	2	–	DUP	UKU
UUP	Lagan Valley	6	1	1	–	1	–	–	3	–	UUP	UKU
UUP	Upper Bann	6	–	2	–	1	1	–	2	–	DUP	Ind. U.
SDLP	South Down	6	–	1	–	2	2	–	1	–	SF	SDLP
SDLP	Newry and Armagh	6	–	1	–	1	3	–	1	–	SF	SDLP
Sinn Féin	Fermanagh & South Tyrone	6	–	1	–	1	2	–	2	–	–	–
Sinn Féin	West Tyrone	6	–	1	–	1	2	–	1	1	Ind. O.	SDLP
Sinn Féin	Mid Ulster	6	–	1	–	1	3	–	1	–	–	–
SDLP	Foyle	6	–	1	–	3	2	–	–	–	–	–
DUP	East Londonderry	6	–	2	–	1	1	–	2	–	DUP	Ind. U.
DUP	East Londonderry	6	–	2	–	1	1	–	2	–	SF	SDLP
Total		108	6	30	1	18	24	1	27	1		
Change since 1998		–	–	+ 10	– 1	– 6	+ 6	– 4	− 1	– 2	–2 NIWC	–
Elected on 25 June 1998		108	6	20	2	24	18	5	28	3	2 NIWC	–

== Manifestos ==
- Alliance Works, Alliance
- Fair Deal Manifesto 2003, Democratic Unionist Party
- Meeting the Challenges - Seizing the Opportunities, Green Party Northern Ireland
- Assembly Election 2003, Northern Ireland Conservatives
- Change the Face of Politics, Northern Ireland Women's Coalition
- 2003 Election Manifesto, Progressive Unionist Party
- Agenda for Government, Sinn Féin
- Reshaping Government, Rebuilding Public Services, Social Democratic and Labour Party
- Turn the Tide, Socialist Environmental Alliance
- Manifesto 2003, Ulster Unionist Party
- It Wont Work... Without the Workers' Party, Workers' Party
