= 1998 Northern Ireland Assembly election =

- 25 June 1998

All 108 seats to the Northern Ireland Assembly
- Turnout: 69.8%
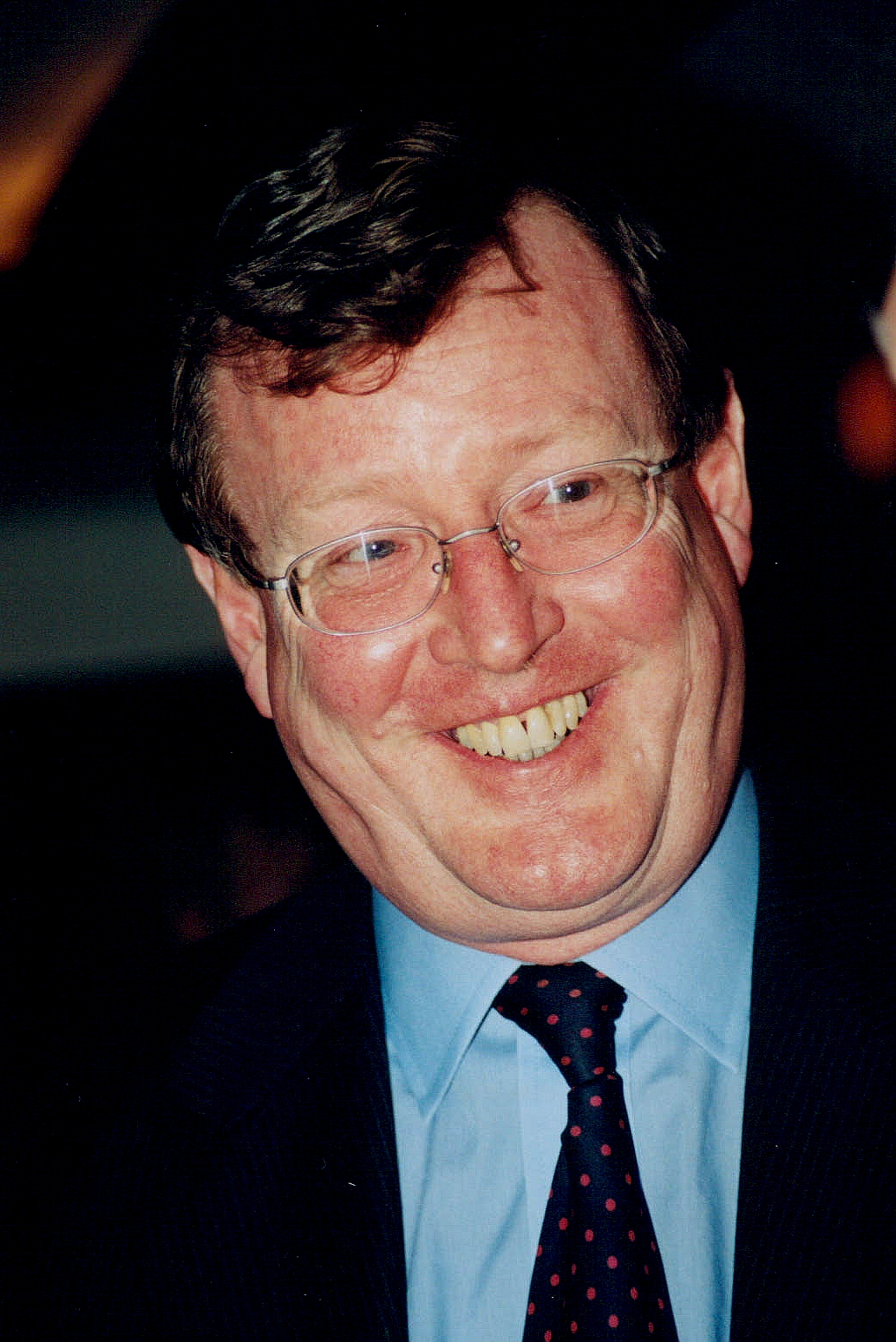

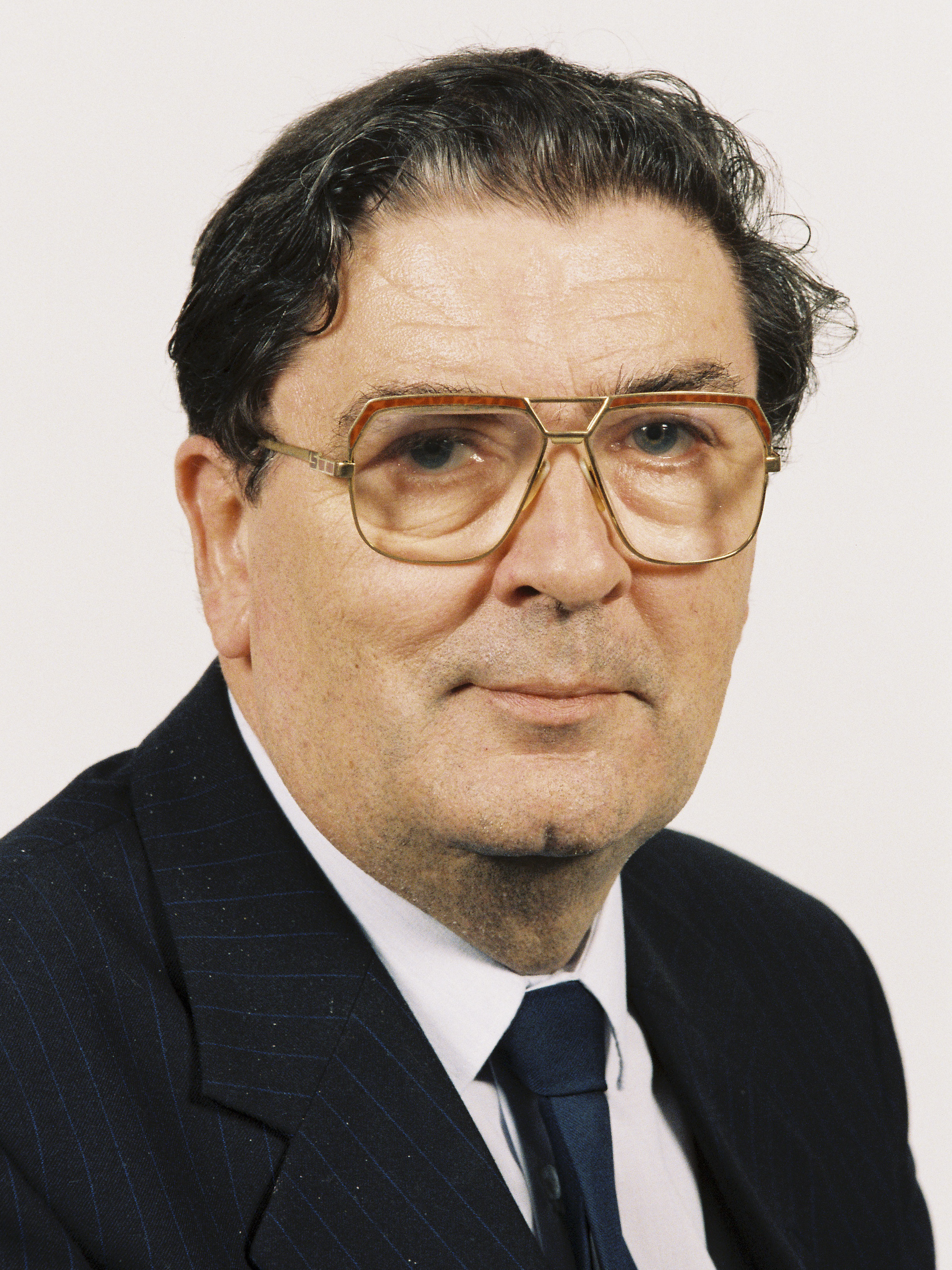

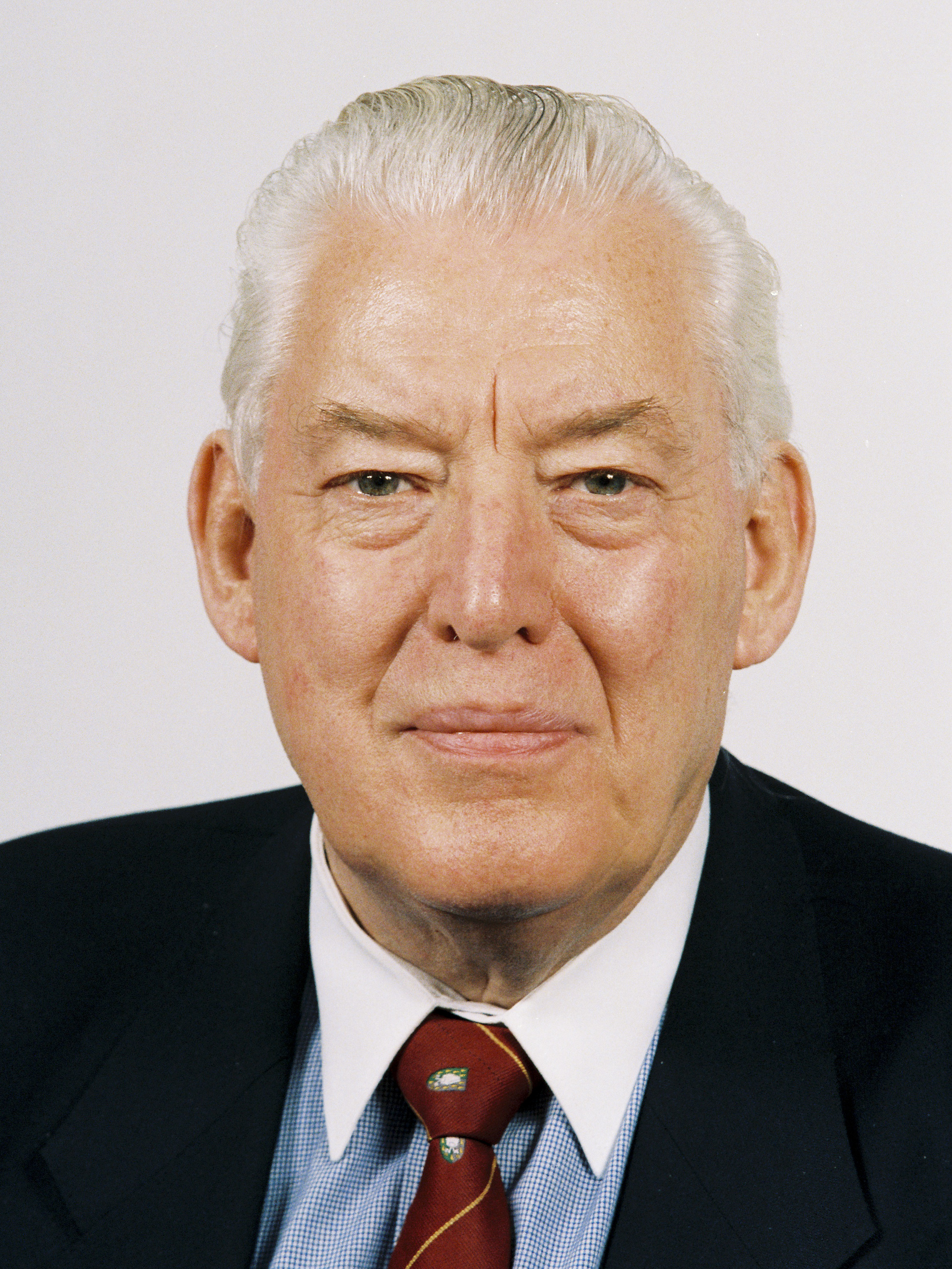

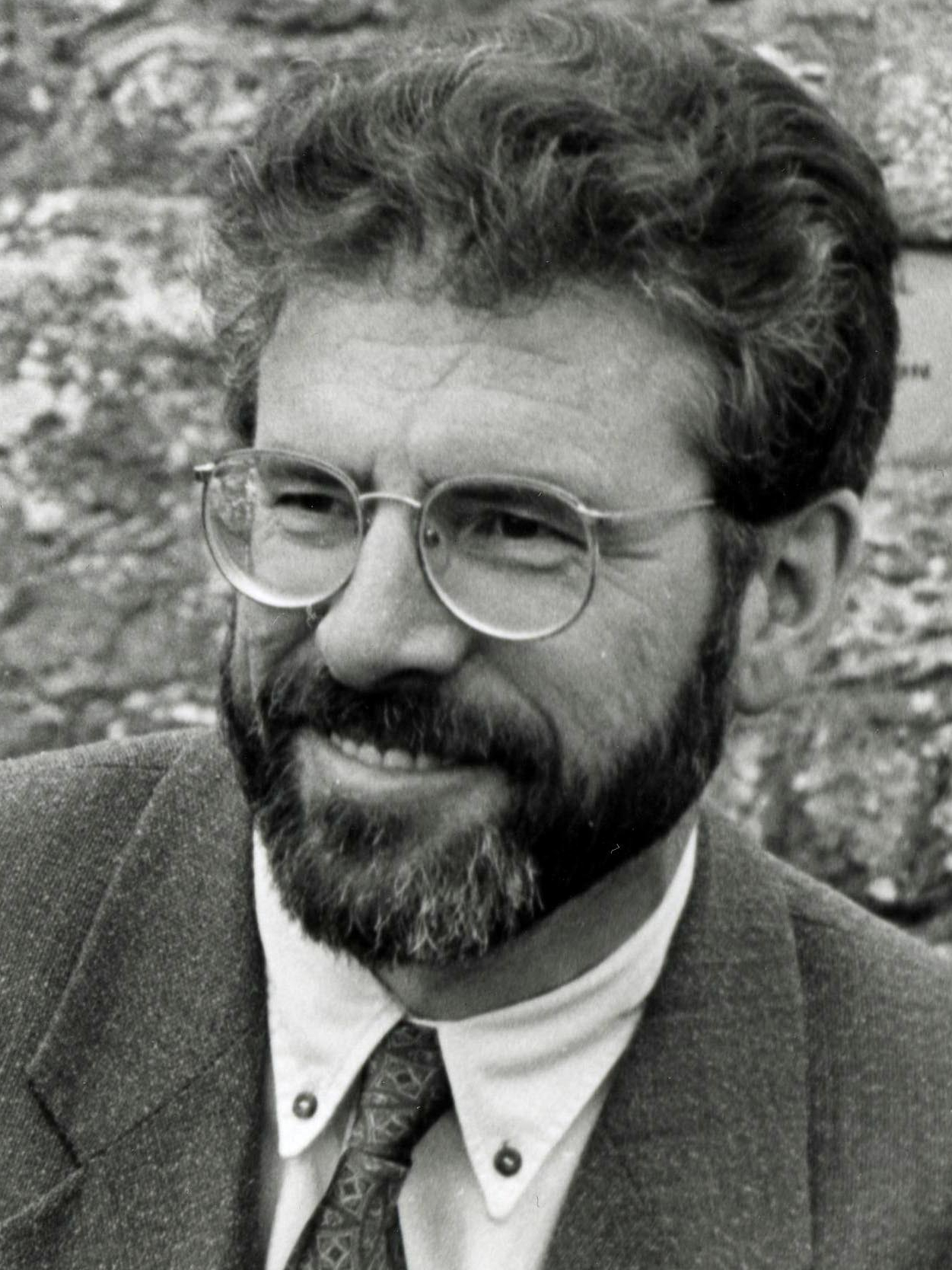

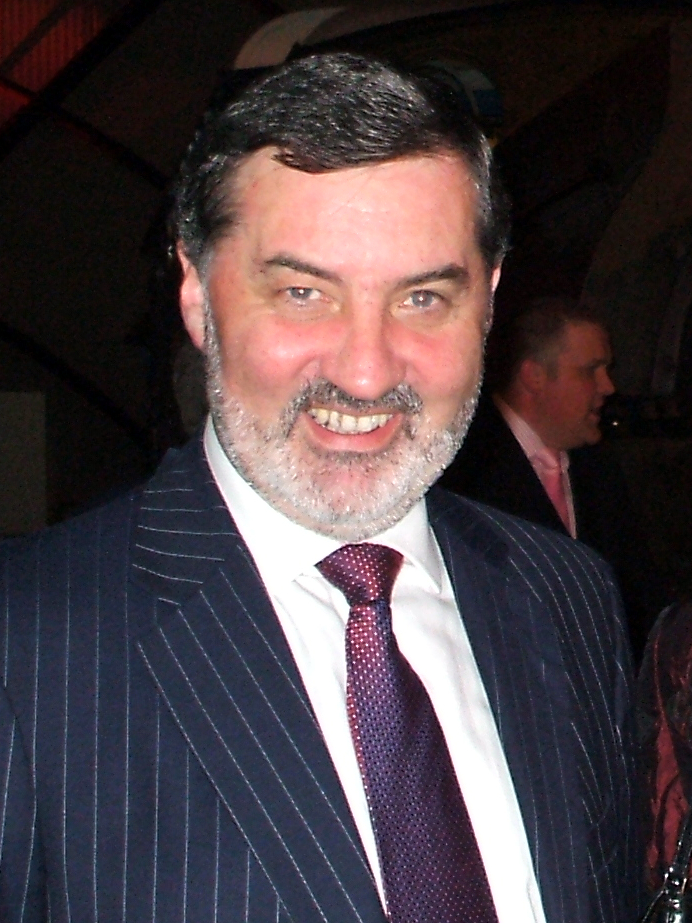
| | First party | Second party | Third party |
|---|---|---|---|
| Leader | David Trimble | John Hume | Ian Paisley |
| Party | UUP | SDLP | DUP |
| Leader since | 8 September 1995 | 28 November 1979 | 30 September 1971 |
| Leader's seat | Upper Bann | Foyle | North Antrim |
| Last election | 30 seats, 24.2% | 21 seats, 21.4% | 24 seats, 18.8% |
| Seats won | 28 | 24 | 20 |
| Seat change | ▼2 | ▲3 | ▼4 |
| Popular vote | 172,225 | 177,963 | 145,917 |
| Percentage | 21.3% | 22.0% | 18.5% |
| Swing | ▼2.9% | ▲0.6% | ▼0.3% |
| | Fourth party | Fifth party | Sixth party |
| | | | UK |
| Leader | Gerry Adams | John Alderdice | Robert McCartney |
| Party | Sinn Féin | Alliance | UK Unionist |
| Leader since | 13 November 1983 | 3 October 1987 | 1995 |
| Leader's seat | Belfast West | Belfast East | North Down |
| Last election | 17 seats, 15.5% | 7 seats, 6.5% | 3 seats, 3.7% |
| Seats won | 18 | 6 | 5 |
| Seat change | ▲1 | ▼1 | ▲2 |
| Popular vote | 142,858 | 52,636 | 36,541 |
| Percentage | 16.7% | 5.6% | 4.5% |
| Swing | ▲1.2% | ▼0.9% | ▲0.8% |
| | Seventh party | Eighth party |
| | PUP | NI |
| Leader | Hugh Smyth | Monica McWilliams & Pearl Sagar |
| Party | PUP | NI Women's Coalition |
| Leader since | 1979 | 1996 |
| Leader's seat | Ran in Belfast West (lost) | Belfast South (McWilliams); Ran in Belfast East (lost) (Sagar) |
| Last election | 2 seats, 3.5% | 2 seats, 1.0% |
| Seats won | 2 | 2 |
| Seat change | Steady | Steady |
| Popular vote | 20,634 | 13,019 |
| Percentage | 2.6% | 1.6% |
| Swing | ▼0.9% | ▲0.6% |
- Election results. Voters elect 6 assembly members from the 18 constituencies.
First Minister and deputy First Minister of Northern Ireland after election
David Trimble (UUP)
Seamus Mallon (SDLP)

The 1998 Northern Ireland Assembly election took place on Thursday, 25 June 1998. This was the first election to the new devolved Northern Ireland Assembly. Six members from each of Northern Ireland's eighteen Westminster Parliamentary constituencies were elected by single transferable vote, giving a total of 108 Members of the Legislative Assembly (MLAs).

== Background and campaign ==
The election was the culmination of the years long Peace Process that had resulted in the Good Friday Agreement on 10 April 1998. The Agreement had been the result of multi-party talks in Northern Ireland, as well as talks with the British and Irish governments. The Agreement would need to be endorsed by referendums in Northern Ireland and the Republic of Ireland that were scheduled for the 22nd of May.

Of the parties who had won election in 1996 to the Northern Ireland Forum only the DUP and UK Unionist Party opposed the Agreement, encouraging a No vote in the referendum. Whilst the UUP officially supported the Agreement, there was significant dissent within its ranks. Several high profile members, including six of their ten MPs, opposed the Agreement. On 18 April the ruling council of the UUP backed the Agreement with 540 delegates in favour and 120 against.

On 24 April the loyalist paramilitary organisation, the Ulster Defence Association announced that it was in support of the Agreement. However on 1 May the Orange Order came out in opposition.

At the Sinn Féin Ard Fheis on 10 May the party voted to end its 77-year policy of abstentionism from NI government institutions. However, it would continue to refuse to take any seats won at Westminster elections.

Two major issues during both the referendum and subsequent Assembly campaign was that of decommissioning and release of paramilitary prisoners. This was cemented when the IRA released a statement saying that it would not agree to decommissioning its weapons. A poll released on 15 May showed that a majority of those planning on voting No were going to do so due to the release of prisoners. On the same day the Ulster Volunteer Force announced a ceasefire in opposition to the Agreement, encouraging a No vote in the referendum.

On 19 May, just three days before the referendum was to be held, U2 held a concert at Belfast's Waterfront Hall in support of the Yes campaign. John Hume, the SDLP leader, and David Trimble, the UUP leader, attended and appeared on stage. Bono held their hands aloft in an image that became iconic of the campaign. The concert was the first time the two men had campaigned together and is credited with giving the Yes campaign a crucial boost in the final days of the campaign.

In the end the Agreement was endorsed by the people of Northern Ireland with 71.1% voting in favour on a turnout of 81.1%.

Compared to the referendum campaign, the Assembly campaign was much more subdued. However, the issue of decommissioning continued to be a major issue. Following a meeting with the Northern Ireland Secretary, Mo Mowlam, Vice President of Sinn Fein, Martin McGuinness, warned against "falling into the trap of trying to make decommissioning the most important item on the agenda".

On 4 June a Northern Ireland Office memo on the upcoming Independent Commission on Policing was leaked, resulting in controversy as it contained none of the people nominated by the Irish government on the behalf of nationalists.

== Results ==
The SDLP topped the polls, receiving about 22 percent of the votes. It won a plurality of the first preference votes. This was the first time a nationalist party had ever achieved this in Northern Ireland's history. It was a feat that would not be repeated until the 2022 Assembly elections when Sinn Féin also topped the poll.

Despite the use of STV, a form of proportional representation, the UUP won four more seats than the SDLP. This has been attributed to several reasons, including:

- Slightly different turnouts across the province, with the result that in the more staunchly unionist east fewer votes were required to elect an MLA than in the SDLP's heartlands in the west.
- The Ulster Unionists proved better at "vote balancing" whereby in the rounds of transfers their candidates were less likely to be eliminated earlier on.
- The Ulster Unionists proved better at attracting transfers from other parties (and due to the vote balancing mentioned above, were more likely to be in a position to benefit from this).

Despite a nationalist party topping the poll with a plurality of votes, unionist parties won a majority of both seats and votes. Of the 108 seats available, 58 designated as unionist, 42 as nationalist and 8 as other. In terms of first preference votes unionist candidates won 50.6% of the vote, compared to nationalists 39.8% and others 8.9% of the vote.^{[Note 1]}

=== Within unionism ===
Whilst the UUP retained its position as the largest party of unionism, its vote share of just 21.25% was the lowest it had ever achieved. The DUP managed to finish just 3.24% behind the UUP, which was considered a significant success. Of the smaller unionist parties the UK Unionist Party managed to win five seats, and the Progressive Unionist Party two seats. This was an improvement for the UKU compared to the 1996 Northern Ireland Forum election, whilst the PUP retained its two seats. The Ulster Democratic Party however failed to win any seats in the Assembly and the party dissolved before the 2003 Assembly election. In addition to the four unionist parties elected, three independent unionists were also elected to the assembly.

=== Within nationalism ===
The election was considered a success for the SDLP, which not only secured the largest vote share, but also increased its number of seats compared to the 1996 Forum elections. Sinn Féin also had a successful election by increasing its share of both votes and seats. Unlike unionism, where the vote was split between several different parties, the nationalist vote was split between just two and there were no significant independent nationalist campaigns.

=== Other parties ===
The Alliance Party had a disappointing night with their vote share remaining unchanged and the net loss of one seat. The election continued the pattern of the Alliance Party winning seats only in heavily unionist areas. The NI Women's Coalition had a successful night, winning two seats. This would be the only Assembly election in which the party would win any seats.

=== Results summary ===
Result by constituencies

The result was (first preference votes only):

| Party | Votes | % | +/– | Seats | +/– |
|---|---|---|---|---|---|
| Social Democratic and Labour Party | 177,963 | 21.96 | +0.6 | 24 | +3 |
| Ulster Unionist Party | 172,225 | 21.25 | -2.9 | 28 | -2 |
| Democratic Unionist Party | 145,917 | 18.01 | -0.8 | 20 | -4 |
| Sinn Féin | 142,858 | 17.63 | +2.2 | 18 | +1 |
| Alliance Party of Northern Ireland | 52,636 | 6.50 | 0.0 | 6 | -1 |
| UK Unionist Party | 36,541 | 4.51 | +0.8 | 5 | +2 |
| Independent Unionist | 24,339 | 3.00 | N/A | 3 | +3 |
| Progressive Unionist Party | 20,634 | 2.55 | -1.0 | 2 | – |
| Northern Ireland Women's Coalition | 13,019 | 1.61 | +0.6 | 2 | – |
| Ulster Democratic Party | 8,651 | 1.07 | -1.1 | – | -2 |
| Labour Party of Northern Ireland | 2,729 | 0.34 | New | – | – |
| Workers' Party (Ireland) | 1,989 | 0.25 | -0.3 | – | – |
| Northern Ireland Conservatives | 1,835 | 0.23 | -0.3 | – | – |
| Ulster Independence Movement | 1,227 | 0.15 | -0.4 | – | – |
| Natural Law Party | 832 | 0.10 | 0.0 | – | – |
| Socialist Party | 789 | 0.10 | New | – | – |
| Green Party of Northern Ireland | 710 | 0.09 | -0.4 | – | – |
| Independent | 5,392 | 0.67 | N/A | – | – |
| **Total** | **810,286** | **100.00** | – | **108** | – |
| Valid votes | 810,286 | 98.39 | | | |
| Invalid/blank votes | 13,248 | 1.61 | | | |
| Total votes | **823,534** | **100.00** | | | |
| Registered voters/turnout | 1,178,556 | 69.88 | | | |

The seat and vote change in the table are in comparison to the 1996 Northern Ireland Forum elections.

^{[Note 1]} Only the independent unionist candidates who got elected are shown in the vote totals

=== Distribution of seats by constituency ===
Party affiliation of the six Assembly members returned by each constituency. The first column indicates the party of the Member of the House of Commons (MP) returned by the corresponding parliamentary constituency in the 1997 United Kingdom general election under the first-past-the-post voting method. A number highlighted in bold indicates the party won the highest number of seats in that constituency.

| Party of MP, 1997 | Constituency | Northern Ireland Assembly seats | | | | | | | | | |
| Party of MP, 1997 | Constituency | Total | | | | | | | | | |
| Party of MP, 1997 | Constituency | Total | APNI | DUP | NI WC | PUP | SDLP | Sinn Féin | UKU | UUP | Ind. |
|---|---|---|---|---|---|---|---|---|---|---|---|
| DUP | North Antrim | 6 | - | **3** | - | - | 1 | - | - | 2 | - |
| UUP | East Antrim | 6 | 1 | 1 | - | - | 1 | - | 1 | **2** | - |
| UUP | South Antrim | 6 | 1 | 1 | - | - | 1 | - | 1 | **2** | - |
| UUP | Belfast North | 6 | - | 1 | - | 1 | 1 | 1 | - | 1 | 1 |
| Sinn Féin | Belfast West | 6 | - | - | - | - | 2 | **4** | - | - | - |
| UUP | Belfast South | 6 | - | 1 | 1 | - | 2 | - | - | 2 | - |
| DUP | Belfast East | 6 | 1 | 2 | - | 1 | - | - | - | 2 | - |
| UK Unionist | North Down | 6 | 1 | - | 1 | - | - | - | 1 | **3** | - |
| UUP | Strangford | 6 | 1 | 2 | - | - | - | - | 1 | 2 | - |
| UUP | Lagan Valley | 6 | 1 | 1 | - | - | 1 | - | 1 | **2** | - |
| UUP | Upper Bann | 6 | - | 1 | - | - | 1 | 1 | - | **2** | 1 |
| SDLP | South Down | 6 | - | 1 | - | - | **3** | 1 | - | 1 | - |
| SDLP | Newry and Armagh | 6 | - | 1 | - | - | 2 | 2 | - | 1 | - |
| UUP | Fermanagh & South Tyrone | 6 | - | 1 | - | - | 1 | 2 | - | 2 | - |
| UUP | West Tyrone | 6 | - | 1 | - | - | 2 | 2 | - | 1 | - |
| Sinn Féin | Mid Ulster | 6 | - | 1 | - | - | 1 | **3** | - | 1 | - |
| SDLP | Foyle | 6 | - | 1 | - | - | **3** | 2 | - | - | - |
| UUP | East Londonderry | 6 | - | 1 | - | - | 2 | - | - | 2 | 1 |
| **Total** | | **108** | 6 | 20 | 2 | 2 | 24 | 18 | 5 | 28 | 3 |

== See also ==
- 1st Northern Ireland Assembly

== Manifestos ==
- It's Time For Tomorrow... Together, Alliance
- Your Best Guarantee for the Future of Northern Ireland, Democratic Unionist Party
- A Fresh Future, Northern Ireland Conservatives
- A New Voice For New Times, Northern Ireland Women's Coalition
- For Real Change – Building a New Ireland, Sinn Féin
- Now, Say Yes To A Future Together, Social Democratic and Labour Party
- Together Within the Union, Ulster Unionist Party
- Manifesto of The Workers' Party, Workers' Party
