= List of members of the Northern Ireland Forum =

This is a list of members of the Northern Ireland Forum. The Forum was elected in 1996. Most members were elected on a constituency basis, but the ten highest political parties winning the most votes were each allocated two top-up seats.

110 members were elected. The Sinn Féin members did not take their seats, while the Social Democratic and Labour Party and UK Unionist Party members later withdrew.

Members are listed by party, and those parties by number of votes won.

== Members by party ==
This is a list of members elected to the Northern Ireland Forum in 1996, sorted by party.

Party	Name	Constituency
Ulster Unionist Party (30)	Antony Alcock	Top up seat
Ulster Unionist Party (30)	Tom Benson	Strangford
Ulster Unionist Party (30)	David Brewster	East Londonderry
Ulster Unionist Party (30)	David Browne	Belfast North
Ulster Unionist Party (30)	David Campbell	Lagan Valley
Ulster Unionist Party (30)	Jim Clarke	Belfast South
Ulster Unionist Party (30)	Robert Coulter	North Antrim
Ulster Unionist Party (30)	Ivan Davis	Lagan Valley
Ulster Unionist Party (30)	Jeffrey Donaldson	Lagan Valley
Ulster Unionist Party (30)	Reg Empey	Belfast East
Ulster Unionist Party (30)	Sam Foster	Fermanagh and South Tyrone
Ulster Unionist Party (30)	Sam Gardiner	Upper Bann
Ulster Unionist Party (30)	Joe Gaston	North Antrim
Ulster Unionist Party (30)	John Gorman	Top up seat
Ulster Unionist Party (30)	John Hunter	South Antrim
Ulster Unionist Party (30)	Derek Hussey	West Tyrone
Ulster Unionist Party (30)	John Junkin	Mid Ulster
Ulster Unionist Party (30)	Peter King	South Antrim
Ulster Unionist Party (30)	Alan McFarland	North Down
Ulster Unionist Party (30)	Ken Maginnis	Fermanagh and South Tyrone
Ulster Unionist Party (30)	Dermot Nesbitt	South Down
Ulster Unionist Party (30)	Thomas Robinson	East Antrim
Ulster Unionist Party (30)	Jim Rodgers	Belfast East
Ulster Unionist Party (30)	Jim Speers	Newry and Armagh
Ulster Unionist Party (30)	May Steele	East Antrim
Ulster Unionist Party (30)	Bob Stoker	Belfast South
Ulster Unionist Party (30)	John Taylor	Strangford
Ulster Unionist Party (30)	David Trimble	Upper Bann
Ulster Unionist Party (30)	Peter Weir	North Down
Ulster Unionist Party (30)	Robert White	East Londonderry
Democratic Unionist Party (24)	May Beattie	East Antrim
Democratic Unionist Party (24)	Robert Bolton	East Londonderry
Democratic Unionist Party (24)	Cecil Calvert	Lagan Valley
Democratic Unionist Party (24)	Gregory Campbell	Top up seat
Democratic Unionist Party (24)	Mervyn Carrick	Upper Bann
Democratic Unionist Party (24)	Wilson Clyde	South Antrim
Democratic Unionist Party (24)	Nigel Dodds	Belfast North
Democratic Unionist Party (24)	Oliver Gibson	West Tyrone
Democratic Unionist Party (24)	Trevor Kirkland	South Antrim
Democratic Unionist Party (24)	St Clair McAlister	North Down
Democratic Unionist Party (24)	William McCrea	Mid Ulster
Democratic Unionist Party (24)	Jack McKee	East Antrim
Democratic Unionist Party (24)	Maurice Morrow	Fermanagh and South Tyrone
Democratic Unionist Party (24)	Ian Paisley	North Antrim
Democratic Unionist Party (24)	Ian Paisley Jr	North Antrim
Democratic Unionist Party (24)	Joan Parkes	Belfast South
Democratic Unionist Party (24)	Edwin Poots	Lagan Valley
Democratic Unionist Party (24)	Iris Robinson	Strangford
Democratic Unionist Party (24)	Peter Robinson	Belfast East
Democratic Unionist Party (24)	Jim Shannon	Strangford
Democratic Unionist Party (24)	Eric Smyth	Top up seat
Democratic Unionist Party (24)	Billy Snoddy	South Antrim
Democratic Unionist Party (24)	Robert Stewart	East Londonderry
Democratic Unionist Party (24)	Sammy Wilson	East Belfast
Social Democratic and Labour Party (21)	Joe Byrne	West Tyrone
Social Democratic and Labour Party (21)	Hugh Carr	South Down
Social Democratic and Labour Party (21)	Arthur Doherty	East Londonderry
Social Democratic and Labour Party (21)	Mark Durkan	Foyle
Social Democratic and Labour Party (21)	Sean Farren	North Antrim
Social Democratic and Labour Party (21)	Frank Feely	Newry and Armagh
Social Democratic and Labour Party (21)	Dorita Field	Top up seat
Social Democratic and Labour Party (21)	Tommy Gallagher	Fermanagh and South Tyrone
Social Democratic and Labour Party (21)	Joe Hendron	Belfast West
Social Democratic and Labour Party (21)	John Hume	Foyle
Social Democratic and Labour Party (21)	Alban Maginness	Belfast North
Social Democratic and Labour Party (21)	Seamus Mallon	Newry and Armagh
Social Democratic and Labour Party (21)	Donovan McClelland	South Antrim
Social Democratic and Labour Party (21)	Alasdair McDonnell	Belfast South
Social Democratic and Labour Party (21)	Patsy McGlone	Mid Ulster
Social Democratic and Labour Party (21)	Paddy McGowan	West Tyrone
Social Democratic and Labour Party (21)	Eddie McGrady	South Down
Social Democratic and Labour Party (21)	Margaret Ritchie	South Down
Social Democratic and Labour Party (21)	Bríd Rodgers	Upper Bann
Social Democratic and Labour Party (21)	Jonathan Stephenson	Top up seat
Social Democratic and Labour Party (21)	John Tierney	Foyle
Sinn Féin (17)	Gerry Adams	Belfast West
Sinn Féin (17)	Annie Armstrong	Belfast West
Sinn Féin (17)	Lucilita Bhreatnach	Top up seat
Sinn Féin (17)	Maria Caraher	Newry and Armagh
Sinn Féin (17)	Pat Doherty	Top up seat
Sinn Féin (17)	Patrick Groogan	Mid Ulster
Sinn Féin (17)	Gerry Kelly	Belfast North
Sinn Féin (17)	Alex Maskey	Belfast West
Sinn Féin (17)	Barry McElduff	West Tyrone
Sinn Féin (17)	Dodie McGuinness	Belfast West
Sinn Féin (17)	Martin McGuinness	Mid Ulster
Sinn Féin (17)	Gerry McHugh	Fermanagh and South Tyrone
Sinn Féin (17)	Mitchel McLaughlin	Foyle
Sinn Féin (17)	Pat McNamee	Newry and Armagh
Sinn Féin (17)	Francie Molloy	Mid Ulster
Sinn Féin (17)	Mick Murphy	South Down
Sinn Féin (17)	Michelle O'Connor	Upper Bann
Alliance Party of Northern Ireland (7)	John Alderdice	Belfast East
Alliance Party of Northern Ireland (7)	Eileen Bell	Top up seat
Alliance Party of Northern Ireland (7)	Seamus Close	Top up seat
Alliance Party of Northern Ireland (7)	Steve McBride	Belfast South
Alliance Party of Northern Ireland (7)	Kieran McCarthy	Strangford
Alliance Party of Northern Ireland (7)	Oliver Napier	North Down
Alliance Party of Northern Ireland (7)	Seán Neeson	East Antrim
UK Unionist Party (3)	Robert McCartney	North Down
UK Unionist Party (3)	Conor Cruise O'Brien	Top up seat
UK Unionist Party (3)	Cedric Wilson	Top up seat
Progressive Unionist Party (2)	David Ervine	Top up seat
Progressive Unionist Party (2)	Hugh Smyth	Top up seat
Ulster Democratic Party (2)	Gary McMichael	Top up seat
Ulster Democratic Party (2)	John White	Top up seat
Northern Ireland Women's Coalition (2)	Monica McWilliams	Top up seat
Northern Ireland Women's Coalition (2)	Pearl Sagar	Top up seat
Labour Coalition (2)	Hugh Casey	Top up seat
Labour Coalition (2)	Malachi Curran	Top up seat

== Representatives by constituency ==
The list is given in alphabetical order by constituency.

Members of the Northern Ireland Forum
Constituency	Name	Party
Belfast East	John Alderdice	Alliance Party of Northern Ireland
Belfast East	Reg Empey	Ulster Unionist Party
Belfast East	Peter Robinson	Democratic Unionist Party
Belfast East	Jim Rodgers	Ulster Unionist Party
Belfast East	Sammy Wilson	Democratic Unionist Party
Belfast North	David Browne	Ulster Unionist Party
Belfast North	Nigel Dodds	Democratic Unionist Party
Belfast North	Gerry Kelly	Sinn Féin
Belfast North	Alban Maginness	Social Democratic and Labour Party
Belfast North	Billy Snoddy	Democratic Unionist Party
Belfast South	Jim Clarke	Ulster Unionist Party
Belfast South	Steve McBride	Alliance Party of Northern Ireland
Belfast South	Alasdair McDonnell	Social Democratic and Labour Party
Belfast South	Joan Parkes	Democratic Unionist Party
Belfast South	Bob Stoker	Ulster Unionist Party
Belfast West	Gerry Adams	Sinn Féin
Belfast West	Annie Armstrong	Sinn Féin
Belfast West	Joe Hendron	Social Democratic and Labour Party
Belfast West	Alex Maskey	Sinn Féin
Belfast West	Dodie McGuinness	Sinn Féin
East Antrim	May Beattie	Democratic Unionist Party
East Antrim	Sean Neeson	Alliance Party of Northern Ireland
East Antrim	Jack McKee	Democratic Unionist Party
East Antrim	Thomas Robinson	Ulster Unionist Party
East Antrim	May Steele	Ulster Unionist Party
East Londonderry	Robert Bolton	Democratic Unionist Party
East Londonderry	David Brewster	Ulster Unionist Party
East Londonderry	Arthur Doherty	Social Democratic and Labour Party
East Londonderry	Robert Stewart	Democratic Unionist Party
East Londonderry	Robert White	Ulster Unionist Party
Fermanagh and South Tyrone	Sam Foster	Ulster Unionist Party
Fermanagh and South Tyrone	Tommy Gallagher	Social Democratic and Labour Party
Fermanagh and South Tyrone	Ken Maginnis	Ulster Unionist Party
Fermanagh and South Tyrone	Gerry McHugh	Sinn Féin
Fermanagh and South Tyrone	Maurice Morrow	Democratic Unionist Party
Foyle	Mark Durkan	Social Democratic and Labour Party
Foyle	John Hume	Social Democratic and Labour Party
Foyle	Martin McGuinness	Sinn Féín
Foyle	Mitchel McLaughlin	Sinn Féín
Foyle	John Tierney	Social Democratic and Labour Party
Lagan Valley	Cecil Calvert	Democratic Unionist Party
Lagan Valley	David Campbell	Ulster Unionist Party
Lagan Valley	Ivan Davis	Ulster Unionist Party
Lagan Valley	Jeffrey Donaldson	Ulster Unionist Party
Lagan Valley	Edwin Poots	Democratic Unionist Party
Mid Ulster	Patrick Groogan	Sinn Féin
Mid Ulster	John Junkin	Ulster Unionist Party
Mid Ulster	William McCrea	Democratic Unionist Party
Mid Ulster	Patsy McGlone	Social Democratic and Labour Party
Mid Ulster	Francie Molloy	Sinn Féin
Newry and Armagh	Maria Caraher	Sinn Féin
Newry and Armagh	Frank Feely	Social Democratic and Labour Party
Newry and Armagh	Danny Kennedy	Ulster Unionist Party
Newry and Armagh	Pat McNamee	Sinn Féin
Newry and Armagh	Seamus Mallon	Social Democratic and Labour Party
North Antrim	Robert Coulter	Ulster Unionist Party
North Antrim	Sean Farren	Social Democratic and Labour Party
North Antrim	Joe Gaston	Ulster Unionist Party
North Antrim	Ian Paisley	Democratic Unionist Party
North Antrim	Ian Paisley Jr	Democratic Unionist Party
North Down	St Clair McAlister	Democratic Unionist Party
North Down	Robert McCartney	UK Unionist Party
North Down	Alan McFarland	Ulster Unionist Party
North Down	Oliver Napier	Alliance Party of Northern Ireland
North Down	Peter Weir	Ulster Unionist Party
South Antrim	Wilson Clyde	Democratic Unionist Party
South Antrim	John Hunter	Ulster Unionist Party
South Antrim	Peter King	Ulster Unionist Party
South Antrim	Trevor Kirkland	Democratic Unionist Party
South Antrim	Donovan McClelland	Social Democratic and Labour Party
South Down	Hugh Carr	Social Democratic and Labour Party
South Down	Dermot Nesbitt	Ulster Unionist Party
South Down	Eddie McGrady	Social Democratic and Labour Party
South Down	Mick Murphy	Sinn Féin
South Down	Margaret Ritchie	Social Democratic and Labour Party
Strangford	Tom Benson	Ulster Unionist Party
Strangford	Kieran McCarthy	Alliance Party of Northern Ireland
Strangford	Iris Robinson	Democratic Unionist Party
Strangford	Jim Shannon	Democratic Unionist Party
Strangford	John Taylor	Ulster Unionist Party
Upper Bann	Mervyn Carrick	Democratic Unionist Party
Upper Bann	Michelle O'Connor	Sinn Féin
Upper Bann	Bríd Rodgers	Social Democratic and Labour Party
Upper Bann	Sam Gardiner	Ulster Unionist Party
Upper Bann	David Trimble	Ulster Unionist Party
West Tyrone	Joe Byrne	Social Democratic and Labour Party
West Tyrone	Oliver Gibson	Democratic Unionist Party
West Tyrone	Derek Hussey	Ulster Unionist Party
West Tyrone	Barry McElduff	Sinn Féin
West Tyrone	Paddy McGowan	Social Democratic and Labour Party
Top up seats	Antony Alcock	Ulster Unionist Party
Top up seats	Eileen Bell	Alliance Party of Northern Ireland
Top up seats	Lucilita Bhreatnach	Sinn Féin
Top up seats	Gregory Campbell	Democratic Unionist Party
Top up seats	Hugh Casey	Labour Coalition
Top up seats	Seamus Close	Alliance Party of Northern Ireland
Top up seats	Malachi Curran	Labour Coalition
Top up seats	Pat Doherty	Sinn Féin
Top up seats	David Ervine	Progressive Unionist Party
Top up seats	Dorita Field	Social Democratic and Labour Party
Top up seats	John Gorman	Ulster Unionist Party
Top up seats	Gary McMichael	Ulster Democratic Party
Top up seats	Monica McWilliams	Northern Ireland Women's Coalition
Top up seats	Conor Cruise O'Brien	UK Unionist Party
Top up seats	Pearl Sagar	Northern Ireland Women's Coalition
Top up seats	Eric Smyth	Democratic Unionist Party
Top up seats	Hugh Smyth	Progressive Unionist Party
Top up seats	Jonathan Stephenson	Social Democratic and Labour Party
Top up seats	John White	Ulster Democratic Party
Top up seats	Cedric Wilson	UK Unionist Party

== Representation of women ==
Of all the members, there were 15 women:

- Annie Armstrong
- May Beattie
- Eileen Bell
- Lucilita Bhreatnach
- Maria Caraher
- Dorita Field
- Dodie McGuinness
- Monica McWilliams
- Michelle O'Connor
- Joan Parkes
- Margaret Ritchie
- Iris Robinson
- Bríd Rodgers
- Pearl Sagar
- Mary Steele

== See also ==
- Members of the Northern Ireland Assembly
- Northern Ireland MPs
