= Peter McLachlan =

Peter McLachlan may refer to:

- Peter McLachlan (Northern Ireland politician)
- Peter McLachlan (Queensland politician)
