= Speaker of the Northern Ireland Assembly =

Presiding officer of the Northern Ireland Assembly

- Irish: Cainteoir Thionól Thuaisceart Éireann
- Logo of the Northern Ireland Assembly

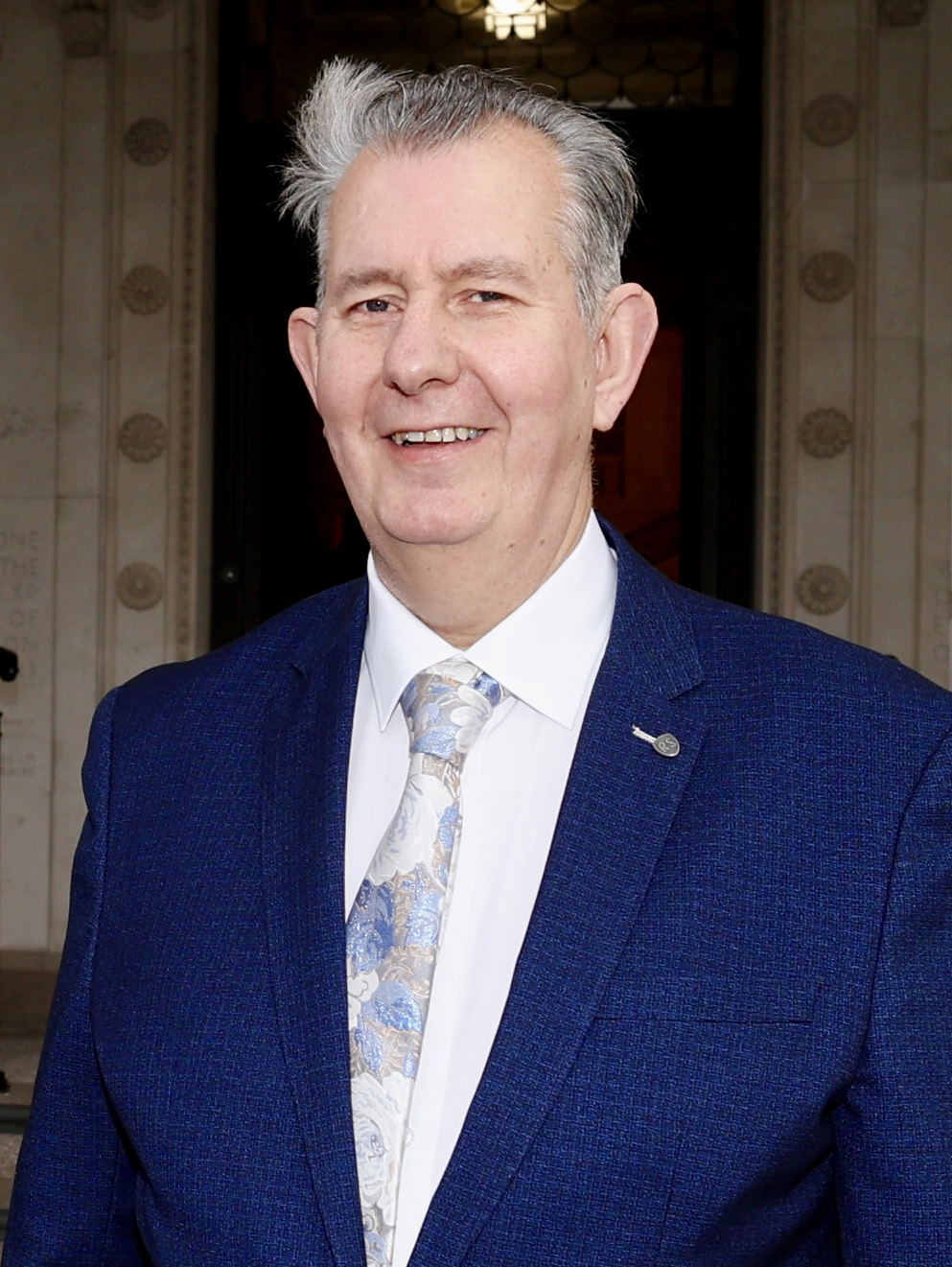
- Incumbent; Edwin Poots since 3 February 2024
- Northern Ireland Assembly; Northern Ireland Assembly Commission
- Style: Mr. Speaker (within the house)
- Appointer: Northern Ireland Assembly (elected by)
- Term length: No limits imposed
- Inaugural holder: Lord Alderdice; 1 July 1998
- Formation: 1998
- Salary: £87,000 annually
- Website: www.niassembly.gov.uk/Assembly-Business/Office-of-the-Speaker

The speaker of the Northern Ireland Assembly (Irish: Ceann Comhairle) (originally having the title of Presiding Officer) is the presiding officer of the Northern Ireland Assembly, elected on a cross-community vote by the Members of the Northern Ireland Assembly. A principal deputy speaker and two deputy speakers are elected to help fulfil the role. The office of Speaker is currently held (since February 2024) by the MLA for Belfast South Edwin Poots of the Democratic Unionist Party.

The Office of the Speaker is located in Parliament Buildings, Stormont, Belfast. The speaker is also the Chairman of the Assembly Commission, the body corporate of the Assembly, and the Chairman of the Assembly Business Committee.

== History ==
The first person to hold the position was Lord Alderdice, appointed by the Secretary of State for Northern Ireland in 1998. Prior to devolution in December 1999 the position was referred to as the Initial Presiding Officer. Alderdice left office in 2004.

Eileen Bell held the office of Speaker in the Assembly established under the Northern Ireland Act 2006 which met between May and October 2006 and in the Transitional Assembly established under the Northern Ireland (St Andrews Agreement) Act 2006 which met between November 2006 and May 2007. Under the Northern Ireland (St Andrews Agreement) Act 2006 she was appointed Speaker of the Northern Ireland Assembly on 8 May 2007.

One of the first items of business for the Northern Ireland Assembly on 8 May 2007 was to elect a new speaker from the MLAs elected in March 2007. The only nominee was William Hay, DUP member for Foyle and he was elected unopposed.

In May 2011 the new position of Principal Deputy Speaker was created. Sinn Féin deputy speaker Francie Molloy was subsequently elected to the new position in June 2011.

== Election ==
During the first meeting of a new Assembly a speaker is elected. The oldest (by age) Member of the Assembly (see Father of the House) who is not seeking the appointment oversees the election as acting speaker. Nominees are then put forward, seconded and accepted by the nominee. A vote is then taken which must achieve the support of both sides of the house (cross-community support). A successful nominee is then deemed elected as Speaker and takes the chair. Upon election the speaker must relinquish all party political affiliations. The newly or re-elected speaker then oversees the selection of three deputy speakers.

== Speakers ==
	Name	Entered office	Left office	Party	Constituency
1.	John Alderdice, Baron Alderdice	1 July 1998	29 February 2004	Alliance	Belfast East
2.	Eileen Bell	8 May 2007	8 May 2007	Alliance	North Down
3.	William Hay	8 May 2007	13 October 2014	DUP	Foyle
4.	Mitchel McLaughlin	12 January 2015	12 May 2016	Sinn Féin	South Antrim
5.	Robin Newton	12 May 2016	11 January 2020	DUP	Belfast East
6.	Alex Maskey	11 January 2020	3 February 2024	Sinn Féin	Belfast West
7.	Edwin Poots	3 February 2024	Incumbent	DUP	Belfast South

== Deputy speakers ==
Deputy Speaker (until 28 June 2011) Principal Deputy Speaker (since 28 June 2011)			Deputy Speaker			Deputy Speaker		
Name	Party	Constituency	Name	Party	Constituency	Name	Party	Constituency
Jane Morrice 31 January 2000 – 7 May 2007	NIWC	North Down	Sir John Gorman; 31 January 2000 – 19 February 2002	UUP	North Down	Donovan McClelland; 31 January 2000 – 7 May 2007	SDLP	South Antrim
Jane Morrice 31 January 2000 – 7 May 2007	NIWC	North Down	Jim Wilson 25 February 2002 – 7 May 2007	UUP	South Antrim	Donovan McClelland; 31 January 2000 – 7 May 2007	SDLP	South Antrim
Francie Molloy 8 May 2007 – 15 April 2013	Sinn Féin	Mid Ulster	David McClarty 8 May 2007 – 11 May 2011	UUP	East Londonderry	John Dallat; 8 May 2007 – 12 May 2016	SDLP	East; Londonderry
Francie Molloy 8 May 2007 – 15 April 2013	Sinn Féin	Mid Ulster	Roy Beggs Jr 12 May 2011 – 12 May 2016	UUP	East Antrim	John Dallat; 8 May 2007 – 12 May 2016	SDLP	East; Londonderry
Mitchel McLaughlin; 15 April 2013 – 12 January 2015	Sinn Féin	South Antrim	Roy Beggs Jr 12 May 2011 – 12 May 2016	UUP	East Antrim	John Dallat; 8 May 2007 – 12 May 2016	SDLP	East; Londonderry
Robin Newton 20 January 2015 – 12 May 2016	DUP	Belfast East	Roy Beggs Jr 12 May 2011 – 12 May 2016	UUP	East Antrim	John Dallat; 8 May 2007 – 12 May 2016	SDLP	East; Londonderry
Caitríona Ruane 12 May 2016 – 19 Oct 2017	Sinn Féin	South Down	Danny Kennedy 12 May 2016 – 29 Jun 2017	UUP	Newry and Armagh	Patsy McGlone; 12 May 2016 – 3 February 2024	SDLP	Mid Ulster
Christopher Stalford; 14 January 2020 – 20 February 2022	DUP	Belfast South	Roy Beggs Jr 11 January 2020 – 31 May 2022	UUP	East Antrim	Patsy McGlone; 12 May 2016 – 3 February 2024	SDLP	Mid Ulster
Carál Ní Chuilín 6 February 2024 – incumbent	Sinn Féin	Belfast North	John Blair 3 February 2024 – incumbent	Alliance	South Antrim	Steve Aiken 3 February 2024 – incumbent	UUP	South Antrim

== Current speaker and deputy speakers ==
Position	Current holder	Term started	Political party	Constituency
Speaker	Edwin Poots	3 February 2024	DUP	Belfast South
Principal Deputy Speaker	Carál Ní Chuilín	6 February 2024	Sinn Féin	Belfast North
Deputy Speaker	John Blair	3 February 2024	Alliance	South Antrim
Deputy Speaker	Steve Aiken	3 February 2024	UUP	South Antrim

== See also ==
- Speaker of the Northern Ireland House of Commons
- Llywydd of the Senedd (equivalent position in Wales)
- Presiding Officer of the Scottish Parliament
- Speaker of the British House of Commons
- Lord Speaker
- Ceann Comhairle (equivalent position in the Irish Dáil or lower house of parliament)
- Cathaoirleach (equivalent position in the Irish Seanad or upper house of parliament)
