= Catholic unionist =

Catholic in Ireland who supported the Union

Catholic Unionist is a term historically used for a Catholic in Ireland who supported the Union which formed the United Kingdom of Great Britain and Ireland, and subsequently used to describe Catholics who support the Union between Northern Ireland and Great Britain.

The term Catholic unionist has become controversial since the start of the 1970-1998 Troubles, due to the strong association of Ulster Unionism with Protestantism. The most recent surveys suggest that the majority of Catholics support Irish Unity, with fewer than one in five expressing support for remaining part of the United Kingdom. They can be contrasted with Protestant nationalists, who supported separation from Great Britain.

== Historical background ==
Catholic support for the Kingdom of Ireland (1542–1800) had the full backing of the Holy See from 1555, with the papal bull Ilius per quem issued by Pope Paul IV during the reign of Queen Mary. Only one monarch after her was a Catholic, James II (1685–89), who called the Parliament of 1689. The kingdom had mainstream support from Jacobites, in hopes that eventually a Catholic monarchy would reign. In general, the Holy See had better relations with Europe's monarchies, particularly Spain, Austria, France and Portugal, and was seen as a conservative force. The Irish Catholic Hierarchy, and notably Archbishop Troy, supported the passage of the Acts of Union 1800, expecting that Catholic MPs would be elected, but this was delayed by three decades.

== Notable Catholic Unionists 1800–1922 ==
Historically, after the Roman Catholic Relief Act 1829, a great number of Irish Catholics such as Thomas O'Hagan and General Luke O'Connor served in senior positions in the British Empire of the 19th century, and many of the Irish nobility and landed gentry had remained Catholic or had converted to Catholicism in the 19th century.

Among these were:

- Lord Killanin
- Charles Russell
- John Bingham, 5th Baron Clanmorris
- Windham Wyndham-Quin, 4th Earl of Dunraven and Mount-Earl
- Geoffrey Taylour, 4th Marquess of Headfort
- The Viscounts Gormanston
- George Forbes, 7th Earl of Granard
- William Monsell, 1st Baron Emly
- Valentine Browne, 4th Earl of Kenmare
- William Howard, 8th Earl of Wicklow
- Sir John Pope Hennessy
- Elizabeth Burke-Plunkett, Countess of Fingall
- John Vesey, 4th Viscount de Vesci

Irish Catholic unionists were a political minority group without their own representation in the House of Commons. They tended to support the Irish Loyal and Patriotic Union and subsequent Irish Unionist Alliance. As the electorate expanded after the Representation of the People Act 1884, the influence of the grander Catholics inevitably declined.

== From Home Rule to Free State ==
Irish Catholic unionists petitioned against the Government of Ireland Bill 1893 on the grounds that it would create a "revolutionary spirit disastrous to the true interests" of Catholicism. Whilst sympathetic to Ulster's resistance during the Home Rule crisis they were not averse to devolution, and some would have preferred a home-ruled united Ireland within the United Kingdom.

For many Catholic officials and lawyers, loyalty to the British system depended on the prevailing political climate. It might be essential for their careers and then dropped; an example being George Gavan Duffy. John O'Connor KC started his political life as a Fenian activist and later became an MP and King's Counsel. Others such as General Bulfin and Antony MacDonnell chose to remain loyal.

From the success of Sinn Féin at the 1918 general election, Irish Catholic Unionists were constantly physically attacked and threatened by republicans for their loyalism, as the Irish poet Edward Dowden would note: "The free expression of opinion by Catholics is checked by a system of intimidation and terrorism". The most notable murder was in June 1922, when a local magistrate James Woulfe-Flanagan was shot dead in front of his family while leaving Mass at Newry Cathedral.

The Holy See itself was cautious in 1916-22 and would not recognise the revolutionary Irish Republic of 1919–22, despite an emotive plea from Seán T. O'Kelly. Once agreement had been reached on the establishment of the Irish Free State, Monsignor Luzio was sent to interview the 26 Irish bishops, describing them on his return as "26 Popes". The British diplomat to the Vatican at the time was John Francis Charles, 7th Count de Salis-Soglio, who owned large landed estates in Limerick and Armagh.

From the 1920s a number have served as cultural and political bridges between Dublin and London, such as Frank Pakenham, 7th Earl of Longford (1905–2001).

On the partition of Ireland in 1921-22 several former Catholic Unionists were appointed to the first Irish Free State Senate.

== Northern Ireland (post-1921) ==
- Andrew Bonaparte-Wyse (1870–1940), Permanent Secretary, Northern Ireland Ministry of Education.
- G. B. Newe (1907–82), Minister of State, Department of the Prime Minister of Northern Ireland, 1971–72, appointed by Brian Faulkner.
- Richard Doherty, author, military historian and RUC reservist from County Londonderry.
- Sir John Gorman, UUP MLA for North Down from 1998 to 2003.
- Sir Denis Henry, was born in County Londonderry in 1864. A son of prosperous Catholic businessman, he was elected MP for South Londonderry in 1916 and later served as Solicitor-General for Ireland and then as the first Lord Chief Justice of Northern Ireland.
- Tina McKenzie, former chairperson, council candidate and European Parliament candidate for the pro-union political party NI21 and businesswoman. She is the daughter of Harry Fitzsimons, a former member of the Provisional IRA.
- Conor Burns, Conservative MP for Bournemouth West since 2010, Minister of State for Trade Policy 2019–2020, Minister of State, Northern Ireland 2021–2022.

Many prominent members of the Alliance Party of Northern Ireland have been Catholics, including the majority of its past leaders (such as John Cushnahan, Oliver Napier and Seán Neeson), some of its Deputy Leaders (such as Seamus Close and Eileen Bell), former MP (of the Northern Ireland Parliament) Thomas Columba Gormley, as well as three of its seven current Assembly members. The Alliance Party is not, as such, a Unionist party, as its support for the Union is based purely on that being the wishes of the majority of the people of Northern Ireland.

== Republic of Ireland ==
- Stan Gebler Davies (1943–94) – a journalist for the Irish Independent, who stood as a Unionist for the Dáil in 1987.
- Edward Haughey (1944–2014), OBE. Educated by the Irish Christian Brothers in Dundalk; self-made pharmaceutical tycoon. Nominated to Seanad Éireann by Albert Reynolds and Bertie Ahern, serving from 1993 to 2002, taking the Fianna Fáil whip. In 2004, he became a life peer in the House of Lords for the Ulster Unionist Party, as Baron Ballyedmond, of Mourne in the County of Down.
- Conor Cruise O'Brien (1917–2008), Labour Party TD (1969–77) and Senator (1977–79) who was later elected to the Northern Ireland Forum in 1996 for the UK Unionist Party; however, he later resigned from the UKUP after his book Memoir: My Life and Themes called on Unionists to consider the benefits of a united Ireland to thwart Sinn Féin.
- Cllr. Maria Gatland née Maguire, a Dublin born former member of the IRA and gun runner, who has become a local councillor for the Conservative and Unionist Party in Croydon, England.

== Voting trends ==
Catholic supporters of the Ulster Unionist Party - the dominant political force in Northern Ireland until the 1970s - tended to support the reformist Prime Minister Terence O'Neill against the emerging hardline Protestant Unionist Party (later the DUP). The UUP later took a more hardline turn itself, and Catholic support for Unionist parties sharply declined. Catholic supporters of the Union today may vote for the moderate Social Democratic and Labour Party (notwithstanding the SDLP's support for a united Ireland), or for the non-partisan Alliance Party of Northern Ireland, or for none of the major parties.

A 2011 survey by the Northern Ireland Life and Times survey found that 52% of Northern Irish Catholics respondents favoured Northern Ireland remaining part of the United Kingdom over a united Ireland.

Northern Ireland Life and Times Survey's 2014 poll results suggest that half of Northern Irish Catholics favour Northern Ireland remaining as part of the United Kingdom. The NILT results also suggest that 6% of Catholics would vote for the nominally unionist Alliance Party, but that only 1% would support any of the mainstream or 'hardline' Unionist parties. Similarly, the poll results suggested that 7% of Protestants would vote for the Alliance Party, while 1% of Protestants would vote for the moderate nationalist SDLP.

Polling published by The Irish Times in February 2025 suggested that a majority of Catholics in Northern Ireland supported Irish unity, up from 55% in 2022 to 63% in 2024.

Catholic unionists in Northern Ireland may support the union with Britain for cultural reasons (such as identifying more with British culture), but also for economic reasons. Brexit, which a majority of Catholics voted against, caused a decline in support for the union. Economic plans in the wake of Brexit have been dubbed a "disaster for unionism" although a substantial number of Irish Catholics were still supporting the union.

== See also ==
- List of Irish Victoria Cross recipients
- Protestant Irish nationalists
- Unionism in Ireland
- West Brit
- Holy See–Ireland relations
