= Trevor Kirkland =

British politician (born 1958)

Member of Newtownabbey Borough Council
- In office 20 May 1981 – 15 May 1985
- Preceded by: Pat McCudden
- Succeeded by: District abolished
- Constituency: Newtownabbey Area A

Member of the Northern Ireland Forum for South Antrim
- In office 30 May 1996 – 25 April 1998

Personal details
- Born: County Antrim, Northern Ireland
- Political party: Democratic Unionist (until 1998)

Trevor Kirkland (born 1958) was a member of the Democratic Unionist Party (DUP); he left when the power sharing executive began.

== Background ==
He served as a member of Newtownabbey Borough Council and later sat for South Antrim in the Northern Ireland Forum.

He is presently pastor of the congregation of the Free Church of Scotland (Continuing) which meets in Doagh.

Northern Ireland Forum
| New forum | Member for South Antrim; 1996–1998 | Forum dissolved |
