= Jim Wilson (Northern Ireland politician) =

British politician

Deputy Speaker of the Northern Ireland Assembly
- In office 25 February 2002 – 28 April 2003
- Preceded by: John Gorman
- Succeeded by: David McClarty (2007)

Member of the Northern Ireland Assembly for Antrim South
- In office 25 June 1998 – 7 March 2007
- Preceded by: New Creation
- Succeeded by: Mitchel McLaughlin

Member of Newtownabbey Borough Council
- In office 15 May 1985 – 1988
- Preceded by: District created
- Succeeded by: Stephen Turkington
- Constituency: Ballyclare
- In office 18 May 1977 – 15 May 1985
- Preceded by: Samuel Todd
- Succeeded by: District abolished
- Constituency: Newtownabbey Area A

Personal details
- Born: 15 December 1941 (age 84) County Antrim, Northern Ireland
- Party: Ulster Unionist Party (from 1978)
- Other political affiliations: Ulster Vanguard (1977)

Jim Wilson (born 15 December 1941) is a Northern Irish unionist politician who was Deputy speaker of the Northern Ireland Assembly from 2002 to 2007. A member of the Ulster Unionist Party (UUP), he was a Member of the Legislative Assembly (MLA) for South Antrim from 1998 to 2007.

== Background ==
Born in County Antrim, Wilson attended Belfast College of Technology before becoming a marine engineer. He was elected to Newtownabbey Borough Council in 1977 for the Vanguard Unionist Progressive Party, and joined the Ulster Unionist Party the following year. However, he resigned his position on the council in 1988. He was UUP General Secretary from the late 1980s until 1998.

Wilson was elected to the Northern Ireland Assembly for South Antrim in 1998 and held his seat at the 2003 election. He retired from front line politics in 2007. In March 2007 he was reappointed General Secretary of the UUP.

Party political offices
Preceded by Frank Millar Jr	General Secretary of the Ulster Unionist Party; 1987–1998	Succeeded by David Boyd
Preceded by Will Corry	Acting General Secretary of the Ulster Unionist Party; 2007–2010	Succeeded by Colin McCusker
Northern Ireland Assembly
New assembly	MLA for Antrim South; 1998–2007	Succeeded by Mitchel McLaughlin
Preceded by Sir John Gorman	Deputy Speaker of the Northern Ireland Assembly; 2002–2007; With: Donovan McClelland; Jane Morrice	Succeeded by Francie Molloy; David McClarty; John Dallat
