= Declan Kearney =

Irish politician (born 1964)

Declan Kearney MLA
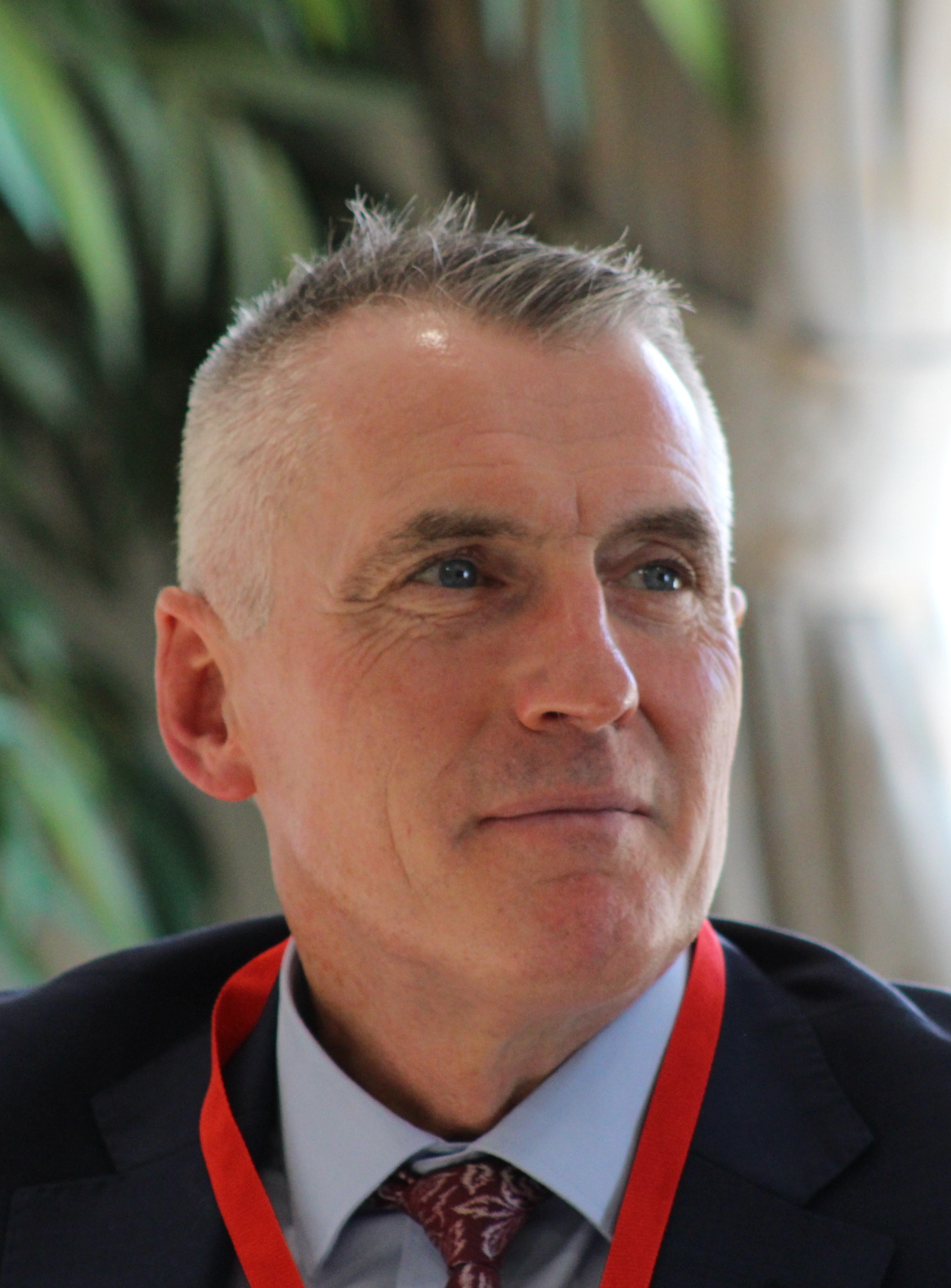
- Kearney in 2022

Junior Minister Assisting the Deputy First Minister
- In office 11 January 2020 – 5 May 2022 Serving with Gordon Lyons, Gary Middleton
- Deputy FM: Michelle O'Neill
- Preceded by: Megan Fearon
- Succeeded by: Pam Cameron (2024)

Member of the Legislative Assembly for South Antrim
- Incumbent
- Assumed office 5 May 2016
- Preceded by: Mitchel McLaughlin

Personal details
- Born: 19 December 1964 (age 61) Antrim, Northern Ireland
- Party: Sinn Féin

Declan Kearney (born 19 December 1964) is an Irish republican politician in Northern Ireland who is the current National Chairman of Sinn Féin. Kearney was a Junior Minister in the Northern Ireland Executive from 2020 to 2022, and a Member of the Legislative Assembly (MLA) for South Antrim since 2016.

== Background ==
Originally from Antrim, he is the son of Oliver and Brigid (née Totten) Kearney. He lived in Derry at the time of his election.

Before his election as an MLA, Kearney served as National Chairman of Sinn Féin, in which capacity he apologised "for all the lives lost during the Troubles". His brother, Ciarán Kearney, husband of Jane (née Donaldson), is the son-in-law of the late Provisional Irish Republican Army volunteer and Sinn Féin politician Denis Donaldson, who was assassinated near Glenties in County Donegal after having been exposed as a British agent.

Kearney was elected to the Northern Ireland Assembly as one of six MLAs for South Antrim at the 2016 Assembly election, retaining his seat at the 2017 and 2022 elections.

He was later appointed as a Junior Minister in the Northern Ireland Executive, following the restoration of the Assembly in January 2020; remaining in this position until May 2022.

Northern Ireland Assembly
Preceded by Mitchel McLaughlin	MLA for South Antrim; 2016–present	Incumbent
