= Joan Parkes =

Politician from Northern Ireland

Belfast City Councillor
- In office 15 May 1985 – 21 May 1997
- Constituency: Balmoral

Member of the Northern Ireland Forum for Belfast South
- In office 30 May 1996 – 25 April 1998

Personal details
- Born: Belfast, Northern Ireland
- Political party: Democratic Unionist Party

Joan Parkes was a Democratic Unionist Party (DUP) politician.

== Political career ==
In the 1996 elections, She was elected to represent Belfast South at the Northern Ireland Forum under the platform of the Democratic Unionist Party.

She was a member of Belfast City Council for the Balmoral DEA from 1985 to 1997.

Northern Ireland Forum
New forum	Member for South Belfast; 1996–1998	Forum dissolved
