= Peter King (Northern Ireland politician) =

Northern Ireland judge and former politician

Member of the Northern Ireland Forum for South Antrim
- In office 30 May 1996 – 25 April 1998
- Preceded by: Forum created
- Succeeded by: Forum dissolved

Personal details
- Party: Ulster Unionist Party
- Profession: Barrister; judge

Peter King is a Northern Irish judge, former barrister and former Ulster Unionist Party politician. He was elected to the Northern Ireland Forum for South Antrim in 1996, took part in Ulster Unionist politics during the period of the Northern Ireland peace process, and later served as a special adviser in the Office of the First Minister and deputy First Minister. He was appointed as a District Judge (Magistrates' Courts) in Northern Ireland in 2013.

== Early political career ==
King emerged in Ulster Unionist politics in the mid-1990s. At the 1996 Northern Ireland Forum election, he headed the UUP list in South Antrim, where the party received 12,001 votes, or 30.2 per cent of the vote. King and fellow UUP candidate John Hunter were elected to the Forum.

During the talks which led to the Good Friday Agreement, King worked with David Brewster and Dean Godson on the UUP's Strand I team. He did not stand in the 1998 Northern Ireland Assembly election.

== Union First and opposition to the Agreement ==
After the Good Friday Agreement, King became associated with Union First, a pressure group within the UUP which was critical of aspects of the Agreement and of David Trimble's leadership. In September 1998, Die Tageszeitung described him as a lawyer and spokesman for Union First. The newspaper reported that King accepted that Sinn Féin was entitled to ministerial office under the Agreement, but argued that Trimble had presented IRA decommissioning as a precondition during the referendum campaign.

King later became chairman of the Young Unionists. In 2000, he was reported as a possible UUP candidate for the 2000 South Antrim by-election, although the party ultimately selected David Burnside.

== Special adviser ==
King later worked in devolved government. By January 2009, he was serving as a special adviser in the Office of the First Minister and deputy First Minister.

== Legal and judicial career ==
After leaving politics and government, King returned to full-time practice as a criminal defence barrister. In November 2013, the Northern Ireland Judicial Appointments Commission announced that he had been appointed as a District Judge (Magistrates' Courts), with effect from 29 November 2013.

In 2014, sitting at Craigavon Magistrates' Court, King heard committal proceedings arising from charges connected to the killing of Robert Hamill. He ruled that there was insufficient evidence to return three defendants for trial.

In 2018, King spoke at a Law Society of Northern Ireland event on human rights and children in the justice system.
