= Jane Morrice =

Northern Irish politician

Deputy speaker of the Northern Ireland Assembly
- In office 31 January 2000 – 28 April 2003
- Preceded by: Office created
- Succeeded by: Francie Molloy (2006)

Member of the Northern Ireland Assembly for North Down
- In office 25 June 1998 – 26 November 2003
- Preceded by: New Creation
- Succeeded by: Alex Easton

Personal details
- Born: Belfast, Northern Ireland
- Party: NI Women's Coalition (1996–2006)
- Other political affiliations: Independent
- Education: University of Ulster

Jane Morrice is a Northern Irish politician and journalist who helped architect the Good Friday Agreement. She is the former Deputy Speaker of the Northern Ireland Assembly, former Head of the European Commission Office in Northern Ireland and former reporter for BBC Belfast. Morrice was Vice President of the European Economic and Social Committee (EESC) from 2013 to 2015 and again from 2019 until 2020 when Brexit forced the United Kingdom out of the European Union. Morrice served two terms as Deputy Chief Commissioner of the Equality Commission for Northern Ireland and was a prominent member of the Northern Ireland Women's Coalition until it ceased to exist in 2006.

Morrice was elected to the Northern Ireland Assembly in June 1998 and was appointed Deputy Speaker in February 2000. She represented NI interests as an EESC Member in Brussels from 2006 to Brexit in 2020, and, after many decades as a Member of the European Movement Northern Ireland, she was nominated Hon. President.

Morrice was involved in the implementation of the Good Friday Agreement and was a member of the Standing Orders Committee which set the initial rules governing Assembly procedures post-devolution. She was also a member of the Assembly's Trade and Industry Committee and the Public Accounts Committee.

== Early life and education ==
Born in Belfast, she is the younger sister of Susan Morrice. Morrice was educated at Ashleigh House School and Methodist College Belfast and the University of Ulster. She began her career as a journalist in Brussels in 1980; In 1986, she moved to BBC Belfast as reporter covering news and current affairs during the 'troubles' and was later promoted to Business and Labour Relations correspondent. In 1992, she was appointed Head of the European Commission (EC) Office in Northern Ireland and, as a member of the task force set up by EC President Delors, she was involved in the creation of the first EU PEACE Programme which has invested £2billion in cross-community and cross-border peace initiatives to date. Morrice graduated from the University of Ulster, with a BA Hon in European Studies. She speaks fluent French and basic Spanish and German.

== Political career ==
Dr Jane Morrice entered politics in 1996 when she co-founded the Northern Ireland Women's Coalition. She stood unsuccessfully as a NI Women’s Coalition representative in North Down at the 1997 United Kingdom general election. She was elected in North Down at the 1998 Northern Ireland Assembly election, but lost the seat at the 2003 election.

Morrice also served as a member of the Board of Governors of the Integrated Education Fund, as Deputy Chief NI Equality Commissioner and as a Board Member of the Laganside Corporation, which was tasked with regenerating Belfast's waterfront.

In 2006, Jane was nominated to represent Northern Ireland on the Brussels-based European Economic and Social Committee (EESC) and, in 2013, she was elected its vice president. In a role similar to that of her previous one as Deputy Speaker of the Northern Ireland Assembly, she chaired sessions of the Committee made up of 350 members from 28 EU Member States speaking 23 languages. In 2008, she was appointed to the Equality Commission for Northern Ireland as Deputy Chief and, in this role, she also chaired the Equality and Diversity Steering Group promoting the role of women in local councils, and was a member of the Audit Committee.

As an EESC Member, Morrice has authored two reports on the EU role in peace-building in Northern Ireland and the world. She also works to promote exchange of experience between Northern Ireland and conflict zones and has carried out such work in Afghanistan, the Lebanon, Turkey and Cyprus.

In recognition of her work, Jane was awarded the Boston Certificate of Recognition for Peace and Equality.

In the 2019 European Parliament election, Morrice stood as an independent candidate for Northern Ireland. She was eliminated in the first count, getting 0.30% of first preference votes.

Jane was awarded an Honorary Doctorate by Queens University Belfast in 2021 to mark her contribution to the Good Friday Agreement of 1998.

Northern Ireland Assembly
New assembly	MLA for North Down; 1998 – 2003	Succeeded by Alex Easton
New office	Deputy Speaker of the Northern Ireland Assembly; 2000–2007; With: Sir John Gorman 2000–2002; Donovan McClelland 2000–2007; Jim Wilson 2002–2007	Succeeded by Francie Molloy; David McClarty; John Dallat
