= David Brewster (politician) =

Unionist politician from Northern Ireland (1964–2021)

Member of the Northern Ireland Forum for East Londonderry
- In office 30 May 1996 – 25 April 1998

Personal details
- Born: 1964 Limavady, County Londonderry, Northern Ireland
- Died: January 20, 2021
- Party: DUP (from 2003)
- Other political affiliations: Ulster Unionist (before 2003)

David Brewster LL.B., (1964 – 20 January 2021) was a Northern Irish solicitor, unionist politician, community activist and historian from Limavady, County Londonderry.

== Background ==
Brewster came to prominence in the Ulster Unionist Party (UUP) as a close associate of David Trimble. Unenthusiastic about Jim Molyneaux's leadership of the party, Brewster backed Trimble's successful candidacy in the September 1995 leadership election. Brewster was already the Secretary of the East Londonderry Association of the party, and Trimble assisted him in winning election as one of the party's honorary secretaries in 1996. Brewster claimed that Trimble also offered to help him take over as the Member of Parliament for East Londonderry from William Ross, a leading figure in the UUP but a critic of Trimble. However, Brewster did not want the role, and instead won a seat in the equivalent constituency on the Northern Ireland Forum. He worked with Peter King and Dean Godson on the UUP's "Strand I" team at the talks which led to the Good Friday Agreement.

Brewster was also active in the Orange Order and, like most UUP members who were prominent Orangemen, he became critical of Trimble's leadership, and opposed the Good Friday Agreement. He joined the oppositionist Union First Group, and left the party in 2003 to join the rival Democratic Unionist Party.

Outside politics, Brewster worked as a solicitor and had his own practice in his hometown of Limavady and served as president of the Roe Valley Chamber of Commerce from 2013-2016. He was also vice chairman of Limavady United Football Club and President of the William F. Massey Foundation.

Northern Ireland Forum
| New forum | Member for East Londonderry; 1996–1998 | Forum dissolved |
