= John Hunter (Northern Ireland politician) =

Member of the Northern Ireland Forum for South Antrim
- In office 30 May 1996 – 25 April 1998

Personal details
- Political party: Ulster Unionist Party

John Hunter is a former Northern Irish unionist politician.

== Political career ==
An active member of the Ulster Unionist Party (UUP), Hunter wrote A Brief History of the Ulster Unionist Council in 1993. Hunter was close to David Trimble and, unenthusiastic about Jim Molyneaux's leadership of the party, he backed Trimble's successful candidacy in the September 1995 leadership election. However, he rapidly became unhappy with Trimble's willingness to reconsider the party's views on the Irish republican movement. He accompanied Trimble to a meeting with John Major in June 1996, at which Major announced that he intended to ask George J. Mitchell to chair talks relating to the Northern Ireland peace process.

While Hunter occasionally attended the talks, which led to the Good Friday Agreement, he did not form part of the main talks team. He was elected to the Northern Ireland Forum in South Antrim. He opposed the Agreement, and although he was selected as a party candidate for the 1998 Northern Ireland Assembly election, he was not elected.

Hunter was suggested as a possible UUP candidate in the 2000 South Antrim by-election, but the party instead stood David Burnside.

Northern Ireland Forum
New forum	Member for South Antrim; 1996–1998	Forum dissolved
