= Michelle O'Connor =

Northern Irish politician

Northern Ireland Forum Member for Upper Bann
- In office 30 May 1996 – 25 April 1998
- Preceded by: New forum
- Succeeded by: Forum dissolved

Personal details
- Political party: Sinn Féin
- Occupation: Politician

Michelle O'Connor was a Sinn Féin politician, who was elected to the Northern Ireland Peace Forum for Upper Bann in 1996. She was the only Sinn Féin member elected for Upper Bann in that election. She left politics shortly afterwards.

Northern Ireland Forum
New forum	Member for Upper Bann; 1996–1998	Forum dissolved
