= Derrick Crothers =

British mathematician, physicist and politician

Derrick Samuel Frederick Crothers (born 24 June 1942 in Belfast, died 15 January 2021) was a Northern Irish mathematician, physicist and former politician.

Crothers grew up in Cookstown, Tyrone, from the age of 7, and studied at Rainey Endowed School, where he won the top mathematics and Science State Exhibition prize in 1959. He then read mathematics at Balliol College, Oxford, before obtaining his doctorate in 1966 at Queen's University Belfast (QUB) on "Theoretical Studies of Inelastic Atomic Collisions" under David Bates In the following years, he lectured at QUB, undertook research at University College London, worked as a tutor for the Open University, and was elected as a Fellow of the Institute of Physics.

At the 1973 Northern Ireland Assembly election, Crothers was elected for the Alliance Party of Northern Ireland in South Antrim, receiving 5,975 first preference votes. He did not stand for the Northern Ireland Constitutional Convention or subsequent assemblies, but did contest the Lower Falls area of Belfast City Council at the 1989 local elections. He took only 135 votes and was not elected.

In 1985, Crothers was promoted to a Personal Chair in Theoretical Physics at QUB. He was elected Member of the Royal Irish Academy in 1991, a Fellow of the American Physical Society in 1994, and an honorary fellow of Trinity College Dublin in 2006, before retiring in 2007. At QUB, he supervised over 30 PhD students.

Northern Ireland Assembly (1973)
New assembly	Assembly Member for South Antrim; 1973–1974	Assembly abolished
