= Antony Alcock =

Member of the Northern Ireland Forum
- In office 30 May 1996 – 25 April 1998
- Constituency: Top-up list

Personal details
- Born: Valletta, Malta
- Party: Ulster Unionist

Antony Evelyn Alcock (12 September 1936 – 2 September 2006) was a British historian and Ulster Unionist Party (UUP) politician.

== Biography ==
Born in Valletta, Malta, he grew up in Devon and Hampshire while at Harrow School from 1950 to 1954. Following his education he was Commissioned during National Service into the Seaforth Highlanders. After leaving the Army in 1957 he studied History and Political Science at McGill University Montreal following which he moved to the United States and 1962 he gained an MA in history from Stanford University. He studied for his doctorate the history of South Tyrol, at the Graduate Institute of International Studies in Geneva between 1963 and 1968. In September 1974 he became Senior Lecturer and Head of the Department of West European Studies at the New University of Ulster at Coleraine (later the University of Ulster), where he stayed until 2001.

His first political involvement was as chairman of the County Londonderry campaign to 'Keep Britain in Europe' during the 1975 referendum. In the same year he was tasked by the Chairman of the Northern Ireland Constitutional Convention, Sir Robert Lowry to produce a paper on similar conflicts in Europe.

In the 1996 elections to the Northern Ireland Forum, Alcock was elected as one of the two UUP 'top up' candidates for the forum, along with Sir John Gorman.

Northern Ireland Forum
New forum	Regional Member; 1996–1998	Forum dissolved
