= Eric Smyth =

Northern Irish Unionist politician and Presbyterian minister

Member of Belfast City Council
- In office 15 May 1985 – 5 May 2005
- Preceded by: District created
- Succeeded by: Diane Dodds
- Constituency: Court
- In office 20 May 1981 – 15 May 1985
- Preceded by: Harry Fletcher
- Succeeded by: District abolished
- Constituency: Belfast Area F

Member of the Northern Ireland Forum
- In office 30 May 1996 – 25 April 1998
- Constituency: Top-up list

Personal details
- Born: Belfast, Northern Ireland
- Party: Traditional Unionist Voice (since 2007)
- Other political affiliations: Democratic Unionist Party (1971 - 2007)

Eric Smyth is a Northern Irish Unionist politician and Presbyterian minister.

== Career ==
Smyth was first elected to Belfast City Council for the Democratic Unionist Party (DUP) in 1981, representing 'Area F' which was equivalent to the modern wards of Falls, Clonard, Blackstaff and Shaftesbury.

However, Area F was abolished in 1985, and Smyth moved to the Court district electoral area which covered the Greater Shankill area. He was elected and held his seat at each subsequent election.

In the 1990s, Smyth's two sons were jailed on drugs charges. Following this, he spent considerable time campaigning against drugs, and in 2003 joined European Cities Against Drugs. In 1995-96, he served as Lord Mayor of Belfast, and during his term of office, he formally welcomed Bill Clinton on a visit to Belfast.

At the elections to the Northern Ireland Forum in 1996, Smyth stood in West Belfast, but was unsuccessful in the heavily republican constituency. The list he headed won only 4.2% of the votes cast. However, he was indirectly elected, as being placed seventh on the DUP's regional list ultimately enabled him to take one of the party's two "top-up" seats.

In September 1996, Smyth announced "I have started my boycott. I will not shop in any Catholic shop". He also claimed that "the President [Bill Clinton] stands for republicanism and is a supporter of it". He reversed his boycott call a week later, describing his statement as "a bit hasty".

At the 1998 Northern Ireland Assembly election, Smyth stood in Belfast East, but was not elected. In the 2001 general election, he stood for the Westminster seat of West Belfast, but was again unsuccessful, taking 6.4% of the vote.

In 2000, Smyth quit the DUP after he failed to win the party's nomination for the Lord Mayoralty. He was persuaded to return, but in 2003, he again announced that he was standing down as a councillor, in order to concentrate on his religious work. The following year, he decided to continue,

He then stood for the Lord Mayoralty again, but was beaten by the Alliance Party's Tom Ekin on the casting vote of Martin Morgan, the previous year's Lord Mayor. Smyth stood for election as the Deputy Lord Mayor but was defeated by Joe O'Donnell of Sinn Féin, this time on the casting vote of Ekin. Following this defeat, reports claim that he told Ekin "your hands are covered in blood, you shameless traitor". Despite his strong opposition to Sinn Féin, Smyth disregarded the DUP's policy stating that its members should have no contact with the group.

Smyth again announced that he was standing down as a councillor in December 2004, on this occasion in an interview in which he made some criticisms of Ian Paisley's leadership of the DUP, and in particular the placement of some former members of the Ulster Unionist Party in prominent party roles. He did not stand for re-election in 2005, and he instead focussed on his role as founder and Reverend of the Jesus Saves Mission Church, closely aligned with the Free Presbyterian Church of Ulster.

He left the DUP, and gave an interview in which he claimed that the unionist community on the Shankill Road did not want loyalist paramilitaries to give up their weapons.

In 2007, Smyth spoke out against the DUP's implementation of the St Andrews Agreement. Following Paisley's agreement to stand down as Moderator of the Free Presbyterian Church, he stated that Paisley "has gone back on everything he ever preached and there was no way he could continue as leader although I do think he should have stood down years ago."

Civic offices
Vacant Title last held by Reg Empey	Deputy Lord Mayor of Belfast; 1990–1991	Succeeded by Herbert Ditty
Preceded by Hugh Smyth	Lord Mayor of Belfast; 1995–1996	Succeeded by Ian Adamson
Northern Ireland Forum
New forum	Member for West Belfast; 1996–1998	Forum dissolved
