= Mitchel McLaughlin =

Northern Ireland former politician

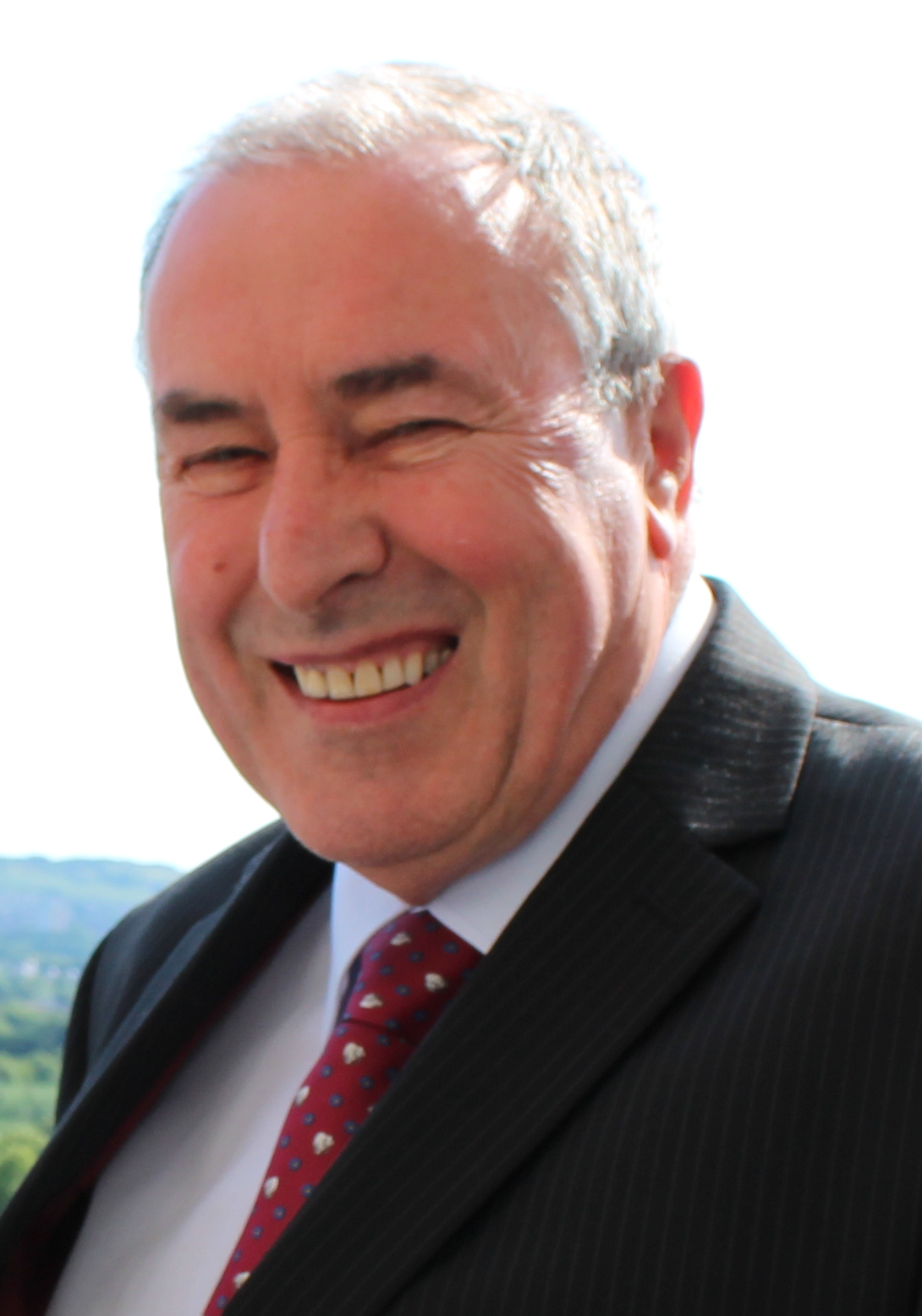
- McLaughlin in 2014

Speaker of the Northern Ireland Assembly
- In office 12 January 2015 – 12 May 2016
- Deputy: Robin Newton; John Dallat; Roy Beggs Jr
- Preceded by: William Hay
- Succeeded by: Robin Newton

Principal Deputy Speaker of the Northern Ireland Assembly
- In office 15 April 2013 – 12 January 2015
- Preceded by: Francie Molloy
- Succeeded by: Robin Newton

Member of the Legislative Assembly for South Antrim
- In office 7 March 2007 – 30 March 2016
- Preceded by: Jim Wilson
- Succeeded by: Declan Kearney

Member of the Legislative Assembly for Foyle
- In office 25 June 1998 – 26 November 2003
- Preceded by: Constituency established
- Succeeded by: Martina Anderson

Member of Derry City Council
- In office 19 May 1993 – 21 May 1997
- Preceded by: Bernard McFadden
- Succeeded by: Marion Hutcheon
- Constituency: Northland

Personal details
- Born: 29 October 1945 (age 80) Bogside, Derry, Northern Ireland
- Party: Sinn Féin
- Spouse: Mary-Lou McLaughlin
- Children: 3
- Website: Mitchel McLaughlin MLA

John Mitchel McLaughlin (born 29 October 1945) is an Irish Sinn Féin former politician who served as Speaker of the Northern Ireland Assembly from 2015 to 2016, becoming the first Nationalist speaker of the Assembly.

McLaughlin was a Member of the Northern Ireland Assembly (MLA) for South Antrim from 2007 to 2016. He was previously an MLA for Foyle from 1998 to 2003.

== Background ==
McLaughlin was born in the Bogside area of Derry, Northern Ireland and educated at Long Tower Boys School, Derry and Christian Brothers Technical College, Derry.

He was elected a member of the Northern Ireland Assembly for Foyle in the 1998 assembly election and re-elected in 2003. In March 2007, McLaughlin transferred to the South Antrim constituency where he topped the poll during the 2007 Assembly election. He was re-elected at the 2011 Assembly election.

After it was revealed that a consultancy contract on a new accounting system extended to 10 times the original budget, McLaughlin said, "I am very, very angry and I am very concerned that there appears to be almost a sense of immunity at the senior civil service level when these basic mistakes are made."

The party chairman came in for criticism in 2005 when he said the kidnapping and killing of Jean McConville – one of the Disappeared – was not a criminal act.

He is married and has three sons.

Party political offices
Preceded by Tom Hartley	Chairperson of Sinn Féin; 1996–2005	Succeeded by Mary Lou McDonald
Preceded by Lucilita Bhreatnach	General Secretary of Sinn Féin; 2003–2007	Succeeded by Rita O'Hare
Northern Ireland Forum
New forum	Member for Foyle; 1996–1998	Forum dissolved
Northern Ireland Assembly
New assembly	MLA for Foyle; 1998–2007	Succeeded by Martina Anderson
Preceded by Jim Wilson	MLA for South Antrim; 2007–2016	Succeeded by Declan Kearney
Political offices
Preceded by William Hay	Speaker of the Northern Ireland Assembly; 2015–2016	Succeeded by Robin Newton
