= Dodie McGuinness =

Northern Ireland Forum Member for West Belfast
- In office 30 May 1996 – 25 April 1998
- Preceded by: New forum
- Succeeded by: Forum dissolved

Personal details
- Born: 1950 (age 75–76) Derry, Northern Ireland
- Party: Sinn Féin

Dodie McGuinness (born 1950) is an Irish Republican politician.

== Background ==
Born Anne Harkin, McGuinness worked at Altnagelvin Hospital before becoming involved in the Northern Ireland Civil Rights Association, then joining Sinn Féin in 1972. She was present at the events of Bloody Sunday. She had Irish origin.

Harkin married the brother of Martin McGuinness, becoming known as Dodie McGuinness. In 1985, she was elected to Derry City Council as a Sinn Féin member, holding the seat until 1993.

McGuinness stood as one of three Sinn Féin candidates in the European election in 1994, but was unsuccessful. By that year, she was a member of the Sinn Féin Ard Chomhairle. In 1996, she was elected to the Northern Ireland Forum as one of four Sinn Féin members in Belfast West.

McGuinness did not stand for the Northern Ireland Assembly, and by 2003, she was the head of the Sinn Féin Bureau in England. She was a member of the Ard Chomhairle, representing Derry. She is distantly related to the author Clive Cussler.

In 2009, Sinn Féin paid out £15,000 without admission of liability to McGuinness after she claimed the party discriminated against her on the grounds of age.

Northern Ireland Forum
New forum	Member for West Belfast; 1996–1998	Forum dissolved
