= Peter McLachlan (Northern Ireland politician) =

Politician in Northern Ireland (1936–1999)

Member of the Northern Ireland Assembly for South Antrim
- In office 1973–1974
- Preceded by: Assembly established
- Succeeded by: Assembly abolished

Personal details
- Born: 21 August 1936 Sheffield, England
- Died: 4 August 1999 (aged 62)
- Party: Unionist Party NI (1974 - 1981)
- Other political affiliations: Ulster Unionist (until 1974)

Peter J. McLachlan (21 August 1936 – 4 August 1999) was a Northern Irish unionist politician.

== Background ==
Born in Sheffield, McLachlan studied at Magdalen College School, Oxford, then at Queen's College, Oxford. He entered the Civil Service, and was an organiser of the National Youth Orchestra of Great Britain. A keen supporter of the United Nations, he was a member of the executive of the United Nations Association from 1960 to 1962. In his spare time, he was also a supporter of the Corrymeela Community. With his wife, McLachlan fostered teenage offenders, later becoming member of the executive of the Northern Ireland Association for the Care and Resettlement of Offenders.

In 1973, McLachlan moved to Lisburn, to work as a civil servant at the Ministry of Finance. He rapidly became a full-time consultant to leader of the Ulster Unionist Party (UUP) Brian Faulkner, and he served as President of the South Antrim Unionist Association from 1973 to 1974. He stood for the UUP in South Antrim at the 1973 Northern Ireland Assembly election, where he was the last candidate elected. On the Assembly, he was a leading supporter of power sharing, active in negotiations with the Social Democratic and Labour Party.

In 1974, McLachlan joined Faulkner's new Unionist Party of Northern Ireland, continuing to act as a political consultant, and he spent a year as Chairman of the Unionist Society. At the October 1974 UK general election, he stood unsuccessfully for UPNI in Belfast East, taking second place with 27% of the vote. He was also unsuccessful at the Northern Ireland Constitutional Convention election in 1975, losing his South Antrim seat.

McLachlan was a founding member of Peace People, in 1976, and became Chairman of the group, before resigning in 1980. He spent the remainder of his life with the Belfast Voluntary Welfare Society, first as general secretary, then as its director.

Northern Ireland Assembly (1973)
New assembly	Assembly Member for South Antrim; 1973–1974	Assembly abolished
