= Democratic Partnership =

Defunct electoral coalition in Northern Ireland

Democratic Partnership was an electoral coalition in Northern Ireland.

Democratic Partnership was founded for the Northern Ireland Forum election of 1996 by the Peace People group, independent peace activists and a number of people from the labour movement, including former Northern Ireland Labour Party Member of Parliament David Bleakley.

The organisation called for reconciliation to end The Troubles, including an acceptance of Northern Ireland's status as part of the United Kingdom, the creation of links with the Republic of Ireland, and the inclusion of Sinn Féin in discussions. It also called for the adoption of a bill of rights.

The group stood eighteen candidates in a number of constituencies, but took only 1,046 votes. It did not undertake any further activity.
