= South Antrim (Assembly constituency) =

Constituency of the Northern Ireland Assembly

Coordinates: 54.630°N 6.134°W

- Northern Ireland Assembly; Parliamentary constituency
- South Antrim shown within Northern Ireland

Current constituency
- Created: 1973
- Seats: 6 (1996–2016); 5 (2017–)
- MLAs: Steve Aiken (UUP); John Blair (APNI); Pam Cameron (DUP); Trevor Clarke (DUP); Declan Kearney (SF)
- Districts: Antrim and Newtownabbey Borough Council; Lisburn and Castlereagh City Council

South Antrim is a constituency in the Northern Ireland Assembly.

The seat was first used for a Northern Ireland-only election for the Northern Ireland Assembly, 1973. It usually shares boundaries with the South Antrim UK Parliament constituency, however the boundaries of the two constituencies were slightly different from 1983 to 1986 as the Assembly boundaries had not caught up with Parliamentary boundary changes and from 1996 to 1997 when members of the Northern Ireland Forum had been elected from the newly drawn Parliamentary constituencies but the 51st Parliament of the United Kingdom, elected in 1992 under the 1983–95 constituency boundaries, was still in session.

Members were then elected from the constituency to the 1975 Constitutional Convention, the 1982 Assembly, the 1996 Forum and then to the current Assembly from 1998.

For further details of the history and boundaries of the constituency, see South Antrim (UK Parliament constituency).

== Members ==
Election	MLA (party)	MLA (party)	MLA (party)	MLA (party)	MLA (party)	MLA (party)	MLA (party)	MLA (party)	MLA (party)	MLA (party)
1973	Derrick Crothers (Alliance)	Anne Dickson (Ind U/UPNI)	Austin Ardill (UUP)	Vincent McCloskey (SDLP)	William Beattie (DUP)	Nat Minford (UUP)	Peter McLachlan (UUP)	Kennedy Lindsay (Vanguard)	8 seats 1973–1982	
1975	Charles Kinahan (Alliance)	Anne Dickson (Ind U/UPNI)	Austin Ardill (UUP)	Vincent McCloskey (SDLP)	William Beattie (DUP)	Stewart Dunlop (DUP)	George Morrison (Vanguard)	Kennedy Lindsay (Vanguard)	8 seats 1973–1982	
1982	Gordon Mawhinney (Alliance)	Fraser Agnew (UUP)	Clifford Forsythe (UUP)	James McDonald (SDLP)	William Beattie (DUP)	Ivan Davis (DUP)	Billy Bell (UUP)	James Molyneaux (UUP)	Roy Thompson (DUP)	Seamus Close (Alliance)
1996	Trevor Kirkland (DUP)	John Hunter (UUP)	Peter King (UUP)	Donovan McClelland (SDLP)	Wilson Clyde (DUP)	5 seats 1996–1998				
1998	David Ford (Alliance)	Jim Wilson (UUP)	Duncan Shipley-Dalton (UUP)	Donovan McClelland (SDLP)	Wilson Clyde (DUP)	Norman Boyd (UKUP)	6 seats 1998–2017			
2003	David Ford (Alliance)	Jim Wilson (UUP)	David Burnside (UUP)	Thomas Burns (SDLP)	Wilson Clyde (DUP)	Paul Girvan (DUP)	6 seats 1998–2017			
2007	David Ford (Alliance)	Mitchel McLaughlin (Sinn Féin)	David Burnside (UUP)	Thomas Burns (SDLP)	William McCrea (DUP)	Trevor Clarke (DUP)	6 seats 1998–2017			
June 2009 co-option	David Ford (Alliance)	Mitchel McLaughlin (Sinn Féin)	Danny Kinahan (UUP)	Thomas Burns (SDLP)	William McCrea (DUP)	Trevor Clarke (DUP)	6 seats 1998–2017			
July 2010 co-option	David Ford (Alliance)	Mitchel McLaughlin (Sinn Féin)	Danny Kinahan (UUP)	Thomas Burns (SDLP)	Paul Girvan (DUP)	Trevor Clarke (DUP)	6 seats 1998–2017			
2011	David Ford (Alliance)	Mitchel McLaughlin (Sinn Féin)	Danny Kinahan (UUP)	Pam Cameron (DUP)	Paul Girvan (DUP)	Trevor Clarke (DUP)	6 seats 1998–2017			
June 2015 co-option	David Ford (Alliance)	Mitchel McLaughlin (Sinn Féin)	Adrian Cochrane-Watson (UUP)	Pam Cameron (DUP)	Paul Girvan (DUP)	Trevor Clarke (DUP)	6 seats 1998–2017			
2016	David Ford (Alliance)	Declan Kearney (Sinn Féin)	Steve Aiken (UUP)	Pam Cameron (DUP)	Paul Girvan (DUP)	Trevor Clarke (DUP)	6 seats 1998–2017			
2017	David Ford (Alliance)	Declan Kearney (Sinn Féin)	Steve Aiken (UUP)	Pam Cameron (DUP)	Paul Girvan (DUP)	5 seats 2017-present				
June 2017 co-option	David Ford (Alliance)	Declan Kearney (Sinn Féin)	Steve Aiken (UUP)	Pam Cameron (DUP)	Trevor Clarke (DUP)	5 seats 2017-present				
July 2018 co-option	John Blair (Alliance)	Declan Kearney (Sinn Féin)	Steve Aiken (UUP)	Pam Cameron (DUP)	Trevor Clarke (DUP)	5 seats 2017-present				
2022	John Blair (Alliance)	Declan Kearney (Sinn Féin)	Steve Aiken (UUP)	Pam Cameron (DUP)	Trevor Clarke (DUP)	5 seats 2017-present				

Note: The columns in this table are used only for presentational purposes, and no significance should be attached to the order of columns. For details of the order in which seats were won at each election, see the detailed results of that election.

== Elections ==
=== Northern Ireland Assembly ===
==== 2027 ====
2027 Assembly election: South Antrim – 5 seats
Party	Candidate	FPv%	Count
Party	Candidate	FPv%	1
UUP	Steve Aiken		
Alliance	John Blair		
UUP	Liz Clarke		
Sinn Féin	Declan Kearney		
SDLP	Linzi McLaren		

==== 2022 ====
2022 Assembly election: South Antrim – 5 seats
Party	Candidate	FPv%	Count				
Party	Candidate	FPv%	1	2	3	4	5
Sinn Féin	**Declan Kearney**	20.08%	**9,185**				
Alliance	**John Blair**	15.99%	7,315	**7,651**			
UUP	**Steve Aiken**	11.71%	5,354	5,361	5,490	**7,668**	
DUP	**Pam Cameron**	15.08%	6,899	6,902	6,999	7,133	**9,322**
DUP	**Trevor Clarke**	10.81%	4,943	4,944	5,005	5,258	**7,025**
SDLP	Roisin Lynch	6.86%	3,139	4,121	4,931	5,050	5,146
TUV	Mel Lucas	9.56%	4,371	4,373	4,489	4,661	
UUP	Paul Michael	6.17%	2,821	2,826	2,963		
Aontú	Róisín Bennett	1.44%	657	783			
Green (NI)	Lesley Veronica	1.18%	539	586			
People Before Profit	Jerry Maguire	0.55%	251	299			
Independent	Andrew Moran	0.57%	262	267			
Electorate: 76,950 Valid: 45,736 (59.44%) Spoilt: 459 Quota: 7,623 Turnout: 46,195 (60.03%)

==== 2017 ====
2017 Assembly election: South Antrim – 5 seats
Party	Candidate	FPv%	Count							
Party	Candidate	FPv%	1	2	3	4	5	6	7	8
Sinn Féin	**Declan Kearney**	16.27%	6,891	6,895	6,925	**7,065**				
UUP	**Steve Aiken**	14.85%	6,287	6,326	6,368	6,494	**8,808**			
Alliance	**David Ford**	12.46%	5,278	5,313	5,494	5,990	6,222	6,768	**9,862**	
DUP	**Paul Girvan**	12.17%	5,152	5,164	5,165	5,223	5,576	5,800	5,873	**5,970**
DUP	**Pam Cameron**	10.87%	4,604	4,613	4,624	4,644	4,979	5,357	5,459	**5,679**
DUP	Trevor Clarke	10.68%	4,522	4,540	4,545	4,559	4,995	5,358	5,445	5,527
SDLP	Roisin Lynch	9.50%	4,024	4,035	4,069	4,229	4,360	4,596		
UUP	Adrian Cochrane-Watson	5.92%	2,505	2,525	2,531	2,583				
TUV	Richard Cairns	3.20%	1,353	1,369	1,378	1,409				
People Before Profit	Ivanka Antova	1.25%	530	535	658					
Independent	David McMaster	1.19%	503	517	563					
Green (NI)	Eleanor Bailey	1.18%	501	504						
NI Conservatives	Mark Logan	0.46%	194							
Electorate: 68,475 Valid: 42,344 (61.84%) Spoilt: 382 Quota: 7,058 Turnout: 42,726 (62.40%)

==== 2016 ====
2016 Assembly election: South Antrim – 6 seats
Party	Candidate	FPv%	Count						
Party	Candidate	FPv%	1	2	3	4	5	6	7
DUP	**Paul Girvan**	14.27%	5,014	**5,036**					
DUP	**Pam Cameron**	13.06%	4,589	4,606	4,704	5,003	**5,067**		
Sinn Féin	**Declan Kearney**	13.18%	4,632	4,654	4,737	4,737	4,739	**6,207**	
Alliance	**David Ford**	8.88%	3,119	3,249	3,639	3,671	3,764	**5,056**	
UUP	**Steve Aiken**	9.34%	3,280	3,342	3,439	3,757	4,403	4,452	**4,512**
DUP	**Trevor Clarke**	10.20%	3,585	3,598	3,668	3,978	4,212	4,286	**4,338**
UUP	Paul Michael	7.30%	2,565	2,617	2,699	2,848	3,914	4,031	4,127
SDLP	Roisin Lynch	9.58%	3,366	3,400	3,515	3,526	3,547		
UUP	Adrian Cochrane-Watson	5.54%	1,947	1,964	2,001	2,200			
TUV	Richard Cairns	3.75%	1,318	1,330	1,505				
Green (NI)	Helen Farley	1.68%	589	689					
UKIP	Robert Hill	1.63%	574	599					
Independent	David McMaster	1.37%	483						
NI Conservatives	Mark Young	0.20%	72						
Electorate: 69,680 Valid: 35,133 (50.42%) Spoilt: 411 Quota: 5,020 Turnout: 35,544 (51.01%)

==== 2011 ====
2011 Assembly election: South Antrim – 6 seats
Party	Candidate	FPv%	Count			
Party	Candidate	FPv%	1	2	3	4
DUP	**Paul Girvan**	15.06%	**4,844**			
Sinn Féin	**Mitchel McLaughlin**	14.49%	**4,662**			
DUP	**Trevor Clarke**	14.32%	**4,607**			
Alliance	**David Ford**	14.13%	4,554	**4,660**		
UUP	**Danny Kinahan**	10.71%	3,445	3,826	**5,585**	
DUP	**Pam Lewis**	8.91%	2,866	3,329	3,797	**4,668**
SDLP	Thomas Burns	10.59%	3,406	3,436	3,482	3,591
UUP	Adrian Cochrane-Watson	7.10%	2,285	2,568		
TUV	Mel Lucas	3.39%	1,091			
BNP	Stephen Parkes	1.26%	404			
Electorate: 65,231 Valid: 32,164 (49.31%) Spoilt: 497 Quota: 4,595 Turnout: 32,661 (50.07%)

==== 2007 ====
2007 Assembly election: South Antrim – 6 seats
Party	Candidate	FPv%	Count							
Party	Candidate	FPv%	1	2	3	4	5	6	7	8
Sinn Féin	**Mitchel McLaughlin**	16.54%	**6,313**							
DUP	**William McCrea**	15.78%	**6,023**							
Alliance	**David Ford**	13.12%	5,007	5,036.55	5,048.07	5,322.04	**5,495.04**			
UUP	**David Burnside**	11.81%	4,507	4,508.2	4,539.07	4,587.4	5,108.97	5,134.41	**6,926.41**	
DUP	**Trevor Clarke**	11.27%	4,302	4,302.75	4,497.42	4,527.02	4,762.07	4,768.31	5,087.71	**5,543.71**
SDLP	**Thomas Burns**	7.13%	2,721	3,080.7	3,081.33	3,188.08	3,206.56	4,965.51	5,133.94	**5,395.94**
DUP	Mel Lucas	7.44%	2,840	2,840.3	3,117.68	3,143.22	3,351.18	3,360.93	3,805.79	4,228.79
UUP	Danny Kinahan	6.26%	2,391	2,392.95	2,400.15	2,451.24	3,107.04	3,130.48		
SDLP	Noreen McClelland	4.00%	1,526	1,897.7	1,898.06	2,012.36	2,025.66			
UUP	Stephen Nicholl	2.43%	927	928.2	933.42	969.72				
UK Unionist	Robert McCartney	2.34%	893	893.3	902.48	932.02				
Green (NI)	Pete Whitcroft	1.33%	507	559.65	561					
NI Conservatives	Stephen O'Brien	0.34%	129	132	132.36					
Workers' Party	Marcella Delaney	0.23%	89	101	101.09					
Electorate: 65,654 Valid: 38,175 (58.15%) Spoilt: 306 Quota: 5,454 Turnout: 38,481 (58.61%)

==== 2003 ====
2003 Assembly election: South Antrim – 6 seats
Party	Candidate	FPv%	Count										
Party	Candidate	FPv%	1	2	3	4	5	6	7	8	9	10	11
UUP	**David Burnside**	18.88%	**7,066**										
DUP	**Wilson Clyde**	13.71%	5,131	5,255.56	5,259.8	5,302	**5,533**						
DUP	**Paul Girvan**	12.88%	4,820	4,900.4	4,914.12	4,976.32	5,176	**6,414**					
UUP	**Jim Wilson**	8.38%	3,135	3,519.96	3,555.44	3,667.8	3,772.48	3,878.32	4,146.32	4,214.32	**5,606.32**		
SDLP	**Thomas Burns**	7.30%	2,732	2,748.56	2,751.56	2,816.56	2,855.48	2,864.2	2,875.2	2,876.2	2,961.36	2,992.36	**4,979.24**
Alliance	**David Ford**	9.07%	3,393	3,456.6	3,504.04	3,754.64	3,821.48	3,872.36	3,954.36	3,969.36	4,488.84	4,696.84	**4,966.2**
Sinn Féin	Martin Meehan	11.48%	4,295	4,296.2	4,298.2	4,311.2	4,312.2	4,313.2	4,314.2	4,314.2	4,317.92	4,318.92	4,785.64
SDLP	Donovan McClelland	7.14%	2,671	2,677.24	2,678.24	2,723.72	2,726.96	2,732.2	2,738.2	2,739.2	2,783.4	2,802.4	
UUP	Adrian Cochrane-Watson	2.55%	953	1,853.72	1,889.68	1,964.8	2,119.48	2,263.16	2,612.16	2,696.16			
DUP	John Smyth	4.01%	1,501	1,530.52	1,532.52	1,600.48	1,635.84						
NI Unionist	Norman Boyd	2.07%	774	826.56	838.52	881							
NI Women's Coalition	Joan Cosgrove	1.24%	465	474.36	484.36								
PUP	Kenneth Wilkinson	0.83%	311	323.24	327.48								
NI Conservatives	Jason Docherty	0.46%	174	179.52									
Electorate: 63,640 Valid: 37,421 (58.80%) Spoilt: 437 Quota: 5,346 Turnout: 37,858 (59.49%)

==== 1998 ====
1998 Assembly election: South Antrim – 6 seats
Party	Candidate	FPv%	Count									
Party	Candidate	FPv%	1	2	3	4	5	6	7	8	9	10
UUP	**Jim Wilson**	15.21%	**6,691**									
DUP	**Wilson Clyde**	13.72%	6,034	6,035	6,060	6,234	6,244.38	**8,522.38**				
UK Unionist	**Norman Boyd**	9.91%	4,360	4,364	4,404	4,521	4,534.68	4,822.88	**6,380.88**			
SDLP	**Donovan McClelland**	9.80%	4,309	4,327	4,480	4,530	4,532.88	4,538	4,540	**6,384**		
UUP	**Duncan Shipley-Dalton**	9.43%	4,147	4,150	4,264	4,571	4,700.36	4,836.38	5,012.38	5,016.38	**6,965.38**	
Alliance	**David Ford**	8.59%	3,778	3,810	4,233	4,456	4,483.6	4,497.96	4,506.96	4,566.96	5,074.32	**5,655.32**
SDLP	Thomas Burns	7.90%	3,474	3,500	3,651	3,701	3,702.8	3,709.04	3,714.04	4,747.04	4,857.16	4,948.16
UUP	John Hunter	5.31%	2,337	2,349	2,399	2,832	3,034.92	3,190.26	3,507.26	3,509.26		
Sinn Féin	Martin Meehan	7.33%	3,226	3,239	3,273	3,275	3,275.12	3,278.12	3,278.12			
DUP	Stuart Deignan	6.40%	2,816	2,819	2,836	2,971	2,977.3					
PUP	Kenneth Wilkinson	3.51%	1,546	1,559	1,637							
NI Women's Coalition	Joan Cosgrove	2.52%	1,108	1,136								
Labour Party NI	Oliver Frawley	0.31%	137									
Natural Law	George Stidolph	0.06%	28									
Electorate: 69,426 Valid: 43,991 (63.36%) Spoilt: 608 Quota: 6,285 Turnout: 44,599 (64.24%)

=== 1996 forum ===
Successful candidates are shown in bold.

Party	Candidate(s)	Votes	Percentage
UUP	**Peter King**; **John Hunter**; Ivan Hunter; Peter Walker; Mervyn Rea	12,001	30.2
DUP	**Wilson Clyde**; **Trevor Kirkland**	9,549	24.0
SDLP	**Donovan McClelland**; Bobby Burns; Tommy McTeague; Bobby Loughran; Oran Keenan	6,025	15.1
Alliance	David Ford; Jim Rooney; Lynn Frazer	3,332	8.4
Sinn Féin	Henry Cushinan; Pauline Davey-Kennedy; Laurence McKeown	2,149	5.4
UK Unionist	Billy Boyd; Stephen Nicholl	2,111	5.3
PUP	Kenneth Wilkinson; Mark Thompson	1,697	4.3
Ulster Democratic	William Blair; David Burgess	1,000	2.5
NI Women's Coalition	Joan Cosgrove; Rosaleen Pelen; Sandra Walsh; Anne McKenna	435	1.1
Independent Templeton	Arthur Templeton; Fraser Agnew	250	0.7
NI Conservatives	Agnes Shirley; Roger Lomas; David Bustard	246	0.6
Labour coalition	Eleanor Bailey; Peter Ruddell; Glen Simpson	236	0.6
Green (NI)	Alan Warren; John Spottiswoode	197	0.5
Democratic Left	Paul Gupta; Paddy McGlinley	119	0.3
Democratic Partnership	Rodney Greene; Paul Mullan	105	0.3
Workers' Party	Eamon Gillen; Bobby Owens	104	0.3
Ulster Independence	Francis Ellison; Samuel Parke	89	0.2
Independent McMullan	John McDowell; William Dunbar	33	0.1
Natural Law	Margaret Adams; Mark Griffiths	16	0.0
Independent Chambers	William Larmour; Greta Bunting	3	0.0

=== 1982 ===
1982 Assembly election: South Antrim – 10 seats
Party	Candidate	FPv%	Count																						
Party	Candidate	FPv%	1	2	3	4	5	6	7	8	9	10	11	12	13	14	15	16	17	18	19	20	21	22	23
UUP	**Jim Molyneaux**	30.07%	**19,978**																						
DUP	**William Beattie**	11.27%	**7,489**																						
UUP	**Fraser Agnew**	4.97%	3,302	**6,201**																					
DUP	**Ivan Davis**	8.12%	5,394	**6,170**																					
UUP	**Clifford Forsythe**	2.43%	1,612	4,243	4,283	4,306	4,319	4,325	4,327	4,376	4,408	4,559	4,563	4,563	4,642	4,654	5,437	5,500	5,501	**6,249**					
DUP	**Roy Thompson**	3.98%	2,646	3,035	3,164	3,165	3,171	3,172	3,175	3,192	3,194	3,254	3,256	3,257	3,793	3,803	3,845	3,868	3,872	3,999	**6,419**				
SDLP	**James McDonald**	3.12%	2,071	2,073	2,073	2,073	2,073	2,074	2,091	2,091	2,115	2,115	2,157	2,652	2,653	2,853	2,853	2,873	4,397	4,400	4,402	4,402	4,402	**7,460**	
Alliance	**Seamus Close**	4.39%	2,916	2,968	2,975	2,976	2,977	2,979	2,990	2,992	3,034	3,044	3,090	3,139	3,140	3,417	3,422	4,164	4,240	4,274	4,284	4,286	4,289	4,750	**5,806**
UUP	**Billy Bell**	1.47%	979	2,906	3,039	3,116	3,166	3,198	3,200	3,284	3,331	3,413	3,413	3,417	3,495	3,506	4,049	4,128	4,129	4,898	5,269	5,541	5,678	5,683	**5,683**
Alliance	**Gordon Mawhinney**	4.00%	2,660	2,774	2,777	2,778	2,779	2,779	2,785	2,793	2,890	2,916	2,951	2,970	2,976	3,084	3,102	4,426	4,462	4,586	4,613	4,617	4,646	4,751	**5,100**
UUP	Frank Millar Jr	0.79%	526	3,407	3,428	3,435	3,449	3,459	3,460	3,507	3,524	3,606	3,609	3,611	3,675	3,682	3,947	3,995	3,997	4,332	4,510	4,589	4,647	4,649	4,652
SDLP	John Clenaghan	4.22%	2,802	2,806	2,808	2,808	2,809	2,809	2,830	2,830	2,850	2,851	2,887	3,083	3,083	3,297	3,299	3,318	4,174	4,178	4,189	4,190	4,191		
DUP	Trevor Kirkland	1.90%	1,265	1,364	2,142	2,143	2,157	2,165	2,165	2,220	2,242	2,325	2,327	2,328	3,044	3,051	3,120	3,141	3,141	3,468					
Ind. Unionist	George Herron	2.70%	1,797	2,237	2,284	2,287	2,291	2,301	2,302	2,345	2,382	2,543	2,545	2,545	2,622	2,632	2,850	2,891	2,891						
SDLP	Patrick Ritchie	3.13%	2,081	2,083	2,083	2,083	2,083	2,084	2,097	2,097	2,111	2,115	2,136	2,438	2,441	2,633	2,633	2,672							
Alliance	Joan Tomlin	3.17%	2,107	2,214	2,216	2,218	2,217	2,217	2,217	2,221	2,290	2,326	2,336	2,352	2,366	2,523	2,546								
UUP	Ivan Hunter	1.40%	930	1,827	1,844	1,852	1,859	1,870	1,871	1,957	1,974	2,021	2,024	2,024	2,058	2,061									
Workers' Party	Kevin Smyth	1.34%	891	902	903	903	903	904	933	935	984	993	1,626	1,705	1,707										
DUP	Samuel Neill	1.88%	1,250	1,377	1,558	1,558	1,562	1,569	1,569	1,597	1,609	1,672	1,673	1,674											
Ind. Nationalist	William McDonnell	1.78%	1,180	1,182	1,182	1,182	1,182	1,182	1,189	1,189	1,203	1,206	1,236												
Workers' Party	Austin Kelly	1.17%	775	779	780	780	781	781	822	822	890	906													
Ind. Unionist	James Smith	1.03%	686	828	836	836	836	838	841	856	879														
Newtownabbey Labour	Bob Kidd	0.84%	560	600	604	605	605	605	651	658															
UUUP	Kennedy Lindsay	0.24%	160	360	364	365	366	473	473																
Communist	Andrew Gibb	0.37%	247	250	250	250	250	251																	
UUUP	Samuel Larmour	0.21%	139	196	204	205	208																		
Electorate: 131,734 Valid: 66,443 (50.44%) Spoilt: 2,076 Quota: 6,041 Turnout: 68,519 (52.01%)

=== 1975 Constitutional Convention ===
1975 Constitutional Convention: South Antrim – 8 seats
Party	Candidate	FPv%	Count											
Party	Candidate	FPv%	1	2	3	4	5	6	7	8	9	10	11	12
DUP	**William Beattie**	17.20%	**11,834**											
UUP	**Austin Ardill**	15.83%	**10,895**											
SDLP	**Vincent McCloskey**	9.82%	6,756	6,756	6,757	**9,058**								
Alliance	**Charles Kinahan**	7.69%	5,294	5,312	5,334	5,444	6,148	6,201	6,227	**9,210**				
Unionist Party NI	**Anne Dickson**	8.32%	5,723	5,911	6,251	6,278	6,325	6,534	6,677	7,021	**7,943**			
DUP	**Stewart Dunlop**	3.58%	2,461	4,178	5,243	5,269	5,271	5,582	7,361	7,414	7,451	7,463	**8,612**	
Vanguard	**Kennedy Lindsay**	6.58%	4,529	5,091	5,575	5,601	5,604	5,915	6,661	6,685	6,706	6,709	**7,966**	
Vanguard	**George Morrison**	4.28%	2,943	3,601	3,692	3,701	3,702	4,669	5,204	5,220	5,248	5,251	6,855	**7,724**
Unionist Party NI	Peter McLachlan	5.70%	3,919	3,968	4,006	4,032	4,082	4,276	4,353	4,509	5,003	5,270	5,812	5,905
UUP	John Logan	3.77%	2,595	2,746	3,519	3,523	3,525	4,626	4,930	4,944	4,999	5,010		
Alliance	John Cousins	4.69%	3,228	3,265	3,340	3,453	4,042	4,061	4,078					
DUP	James Smith	4.32%	2,970	3,336	3,468	3,490	3,499	3,686						
UUP	Samuel Semple	4.09%	2,813	3,175	3,395	3,400	3,403							
SDLP	James McDonald	2.74%	1,888	1,889	1,889									
Republican Clubs	Kevin Smith	1.03%	710	714	718									
Communist	William Somerset	0.36%	248	249	249									
Electorate: 119,723 Valid: 68,806 (57.47%) Spoilt: 1,323 Quota: 7,646 Turnout: 70,129 (58.58%)

=== 1973 ===
1973 Assembly election: South Antrim – 8 seats
Party	Candidate	FPv%	Count																	
Party	Candidate	FPv%	1	2	3	4	5	6	7	8	9	10	11	12	13	14	15	16	17	18
DUP	**William Beattie**	13.50%	**10,126**																	
Ind. Unionist	**Anne Dickson**	12.04%	**9,033**																	
SDLP	**Vincent McCloskey**	10.53%	7,899	7,900	7,901	7,915	7,977	7,979	8,060	8,178	**8,552**									
Alliance	**Derrick Crothers**	7.96%	5,975	5,983	6,020	6,038	6,166	6,176	6,299	6,928	7,435	7,536	7,597	7,600	**10,234**					
UUP	**Nat Minford**	7.05%	5,289	5,324	5,452	5,453	5,454	5,499	5,525	5,539	5,595	5,598	5,836	5,877	5,934	6,266	6,886	7,016	**9,076**	
UUP	**Austin Ardill**	6.98%	5,234	5,337	5,397	5,400	5,401	5,496	5,500	5,510	5,534	5,536	6,368	6,431	6,467	6,628	7,823	8,128	**8,645**	
Vanguard	**Kennedy Lindsay**	4.00%	3,005	3,148	3,155	3,157	3,157	3,181	3,186	3,187	3,207	3,207	3,305	5,037	5,047	5,066	5,209	7,829	8,011	**8,034**
UUP	**Peter McLachlan**	5.31%	3,983	4,002	4,107	4,109	4,110	4,144	4,156	4,163	4,202	4,202	4,313	4,327	4,366	4,534	5,456	5,517	7,324	**7,998**
DUP	Allen Annesley	5.64%	4,232	5,321	5,332	5,333	5,334	5,357	5,365	5,370	5,397	5,397	5,504	5,685	5,698	5,733	5,943	6,488	6,621	6,663
UUP	George Swann	4.99%	3,742	3,754	3,816	3,817	3,817	3,856	3,864	3,895	3,920	3,923	4,226	4,266	4,316	4,628	4,949	5,012		
Vanguard	Robert Bradford	3.45%	2,587	2,883	2,890	2,891	2,894	2,907	2,917	2,922	2,943	2,943	3,080	3,740	3,752	3,774	3,891			
UUP	Alexander McGowan	3.10%	2,327	2,343	2,389	2,390	2,392	2,686	2,694	2,700	2,746	2,747	3,382	3,436	3,487	3,659				
Alliance	William Gawn	2.28%	1,709	1,711	1,731	1,741	1,783	1,787	1,828	2,591	2,918	3,018	3,059	3,069						
Vanguard	William Snoddy	3.61%	2,706	2,731	2,735	2,736	2,736	2,748	2,757	2,765	2,790	2,790	2,809							
UUP	John Blakeley	3.17%	2,375	2,438	2,493	2,496	2,500	2,655	2,659	2,664	2,697	2,700								
NI Labour	Bob Kidd	0.99%	740	742	747	921	1,204	1,207	1,734	1,791										
Alliance	Joan Tomlin	2.10%	1,572	1,573	1,585	1,596	1,608	1,613	1,685											
NI Labour	Sandy Scott	1.14%	854	857	861	909	969	971												
UUP	William King	0.92%	694	708	767	771	771													
NI Labour	Deirdre Byrne	0.75%	559	561	562	608														
NI Labour	Robert Johnston	0.46%	342	343	345															
Electorate: 114,240 Valid: 75,033 (65.68%) Spoilt: 1,486 Quota: 8,338 Turnout: 76,519 (66.98%)
