= John Gorman (politician) =

Northern Irish politician (1923–2014)

Sir John Gorman CVO, CBE, MC, DL

Deputy Speaker of the Northern Ireland Assembly
- In office 31 January 2000 – 19 February 2002
- Preceded by: Office established
- Succeeded by: Jim Wilson

Member of the Northern Ireland Assembly for North Down
- In office 25 June 1998 – 26 November 2003
- Preceded by: Constituency established
- Succeeded by: Leslie Cree

Chairman of the Northern Ireland Forum
- In office 30 May 1996 – 25 April 1998

Member of the Northern Ireland Forum
- In office 30 May 1996 – 25 April 1998
- Constituency: Top-up list

Personal details
- Born: John Reginald Gorman; 1 February 1923 Omagh, Northern Ireland, UK
- Died: 26 May 2014 (aged 91) Killyleagh, Northern Ireland, UK
- Party: Ulster Unionist Party
- Spouse: Heather Caruth
- Children: Johnny; Angela; Rosanagh; Justin
- Education: Glasgow University; Harvard Business School
- Military career
- Allegiance: United Kingdom
- Branch: British Army
- Service years: 1942–1946
- Rank: Captain
- Service number: 225172
- Unit: Irish Guards
- Conflicts: World War II
- Awards: Military Cross; Croix de Guerre

Sir John Reginald Gorman CVO, CBE, MC, DL (1 February 1923 – 26 May 2014) was an Ulster Unionist Party (UUP) politician who served as a Deputy Speaker of the Northern Ireland Assembly from 2000 to 2002, and was a Member of the Northern Ireland Assembly (MLA) for North Down from 1998 to 2003. He was a Catholic Unionist.

== Early life ==
He was born at Mullaghmore House, Omagh in 1923 and educated at Rockport School in Holywood Co Down, Loreto Convent Grammar School (Omagh), Portora Royal School, Glasgow University and Harvard Business School.

== World War II ==
When the Second World War broke out in September 1939, Gorman was attending the Imperial Service College in Windsor. He then attended Portora Royal School, before joining the British Army. Gorman was commissioned as a second lieutenant into the Irish Guards on 5 December 1942. He was posted to the regiment's 2nd Battalion, which formed part of the 5th Guards Armoured Brigade of Major General Allan Adair's Guards Armoured Division, which, in late June 1944, landed in Normandy as part of Operation Overlord, a few weeks after D-Day landings.

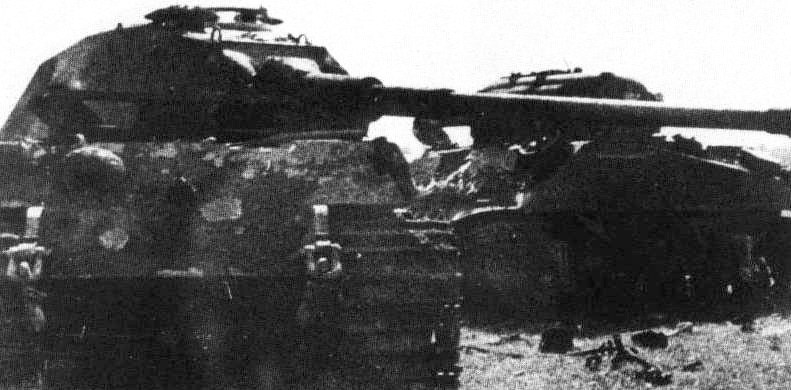
John Gorman's Sherman tank Ballyragget, and the Tiger II tank of 503rd Heavy Panzer Battalion that it knocked out by ramming, July 1944.

On 18 July 1944, while taking part in Operation Goodwood, he was commanding a group of M4 Sherman tanks east of Cagny that suddenly encountered a mixed group of four German tanks at a range of only 300 yards (270 m). The group included one of the formidable Tiger II heavy tanks. As he knew his Sherman's gun would have little effect on the Tiger's thick armour, Gorman ordered his driver to ram the German tank. Gorman's gunner had time to fire one round before impact, but the shell was an explosive one, not armour piercing, and had little effect.

Both tanks were disabled by the collision and both crews immediately abandoned their vehicles. The last to leave the Sherman was the assistant driver, whose exit was slowed by his hatch being blocked. Once clear of the tank, he followed a group of men who were running for a nearby ditch, only to discover after joining them that they were the German tank crew. They glared at him, so he simply saluted and ran off to join his own crew.

While his crew took shelter, Gorman ran to fetch a Sherman Firefly, a Sherman fitted with the powerful, British 17-pounder anti-tank gun. One of the Firefly's four crew had been decapitated and two others were in shock, but Gorman was able to remove the body and take command of the tank. With the Firefly, he was able to complete the destruction of both the Tiger II and his disabled Sherman. He was awarded the Military Cross for his actions, while his driver, Lance-Corporal James Baron, was awarded the Military Medal. Gorman was promoted to the rank of captain. However, this account is contested by the German tank's gunner, Gefreiter Thaysen, who said that his commander ordered to back up, hitting the Sherman with its rear. Thaysen's testimony also contradicts Gorman finishing off the Tiger II with a Sherman Firefly.

Later in the war, Gorman took part in Operation Market Garden, the unsuccessful attempt to break through German lines in the Netherlands and advance into Northern Germany. The Irish Guards were a leading part of the ground part of the operation and Gorman's tanks reached the bridge at Nijmegen before the operation was called off.

== Post-war career ==
After the war, Gorman left the army and joined the Royal Ulster Constabulary. He was the district inspector for Antrim until 1955, when he became district inspector for Armagh. This was during the Irish Republican Army's Border Campaign. With the approval of John D'Alton, the Archbishop of Armagh, Gorman uncovered an IRA bomb factory hidden in St Patrick's Cathedral, Armagh. He was also responsible for liaising with MI5 and MI6.

He left the police in the early 1960s to become head of security for the British Overseas Airways Corporation. He later became head of personnel, then manager of the airline's operations in Canada, and then manager for South Asia. He left the airline in 1979 and returned to Northern Ireland.

== Political career ==
After an assorted career, during which he was for a time Chief Executive of the Northern Ireland Housing Executive, he was elected to the Northern Ireland Forum for Political Dialogue in 1996 as a top-up candidate from the Ulster Unionist Party list. He served as Chairman of the Forum from 1996 to 1998. In 1998 he was elected to the Northern Ireland Assembly for North Down and served as a Deputy Speaker of the Assembly. He resigned as Deputy Speaker in February 2002.

== Honours ==
He was knighted in the Birthday Honours of 1998 and was a Deputy Lord Lieutenant (DL) of County Down. In 2007 Sir John was awarded the Croix de Guerre (France) for actions during World War II.

Northern Ireland Forum
New forum	Regional Member; 1996–1998	Forum dissolved
Northern Ireland Assembly
New assembly	MLA for North Down; 1998–2003	Succeeded by Leslie Cree
Political offices
New office	Deputy Speaker; 1998–2002; With: Donovan McClelland; Jane Morrice	Succeeded by Donovan McClelland; Jane Morrice; Jim Wilson
