= Northern Ireland Forum =

Provisional forum for the Northern Ireland peace process

Northern Ireland Forum for Political Dialogue
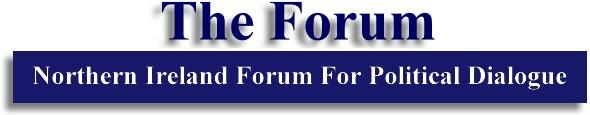

Type
- Type: Unicameral deliberative assembly

History
- Established: 1996
- Disbanded: 25 April 1998
- Preceded by: Northern Ireland Assembly (1982)
- Succeeded by: Northern Ireland Assembly

Leadership
- Chairman: John Gorman
- Seats: 110

Elections
- Voting system: Party List PR

Meeting place
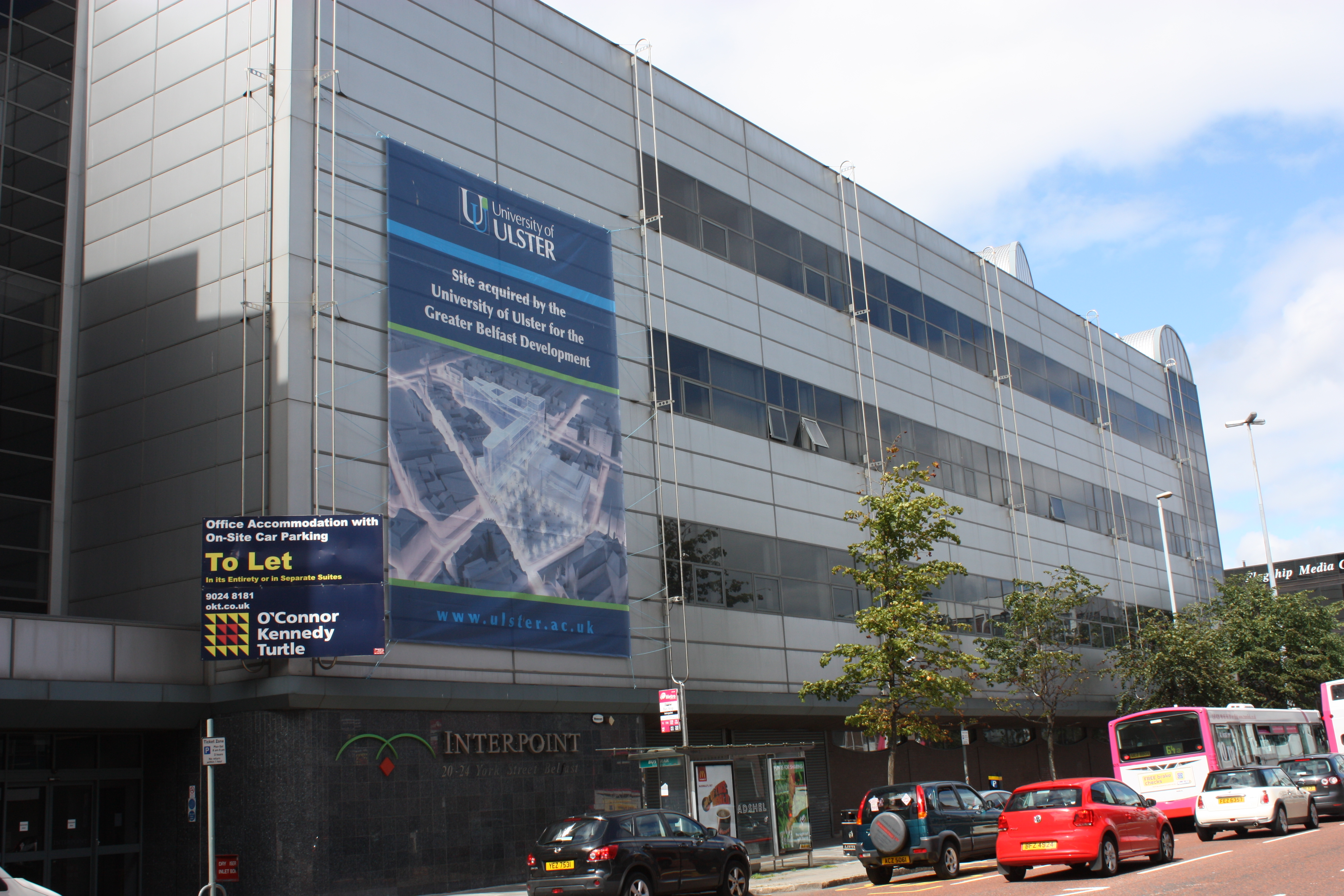
- 3rd Floor, Interpoint, 20-24 York Street, Belfast

The Northern Ireland Forum for Political Dialogue (Irish: Fóram Thuaisceart Éireann um Idirphlé Polaitiúil) was an elected deliberative body set up in 1996 as part of a process of negotiations that eventually led to the Good Friday Agreement in 1998.

The forum was elected, with five members being elected for each Westminster Parliamentary constituency for Northern Ireland, under the D'Hondt method of party-list proportional representation. There was also a "topup" of two seats for the ten parties polling most votes; this ensured that two loyalist parties associated with paramilitary groups were represented. See members of the Northern Ireland Forum for a complete list.

== Functions and legislative basis ==
The Forum was constituted under the Northern Ireland (Entry to Negotiations, etc) Act 1996. The Forum was described in the Act as being purely deliberative in nature, and was explicitly stated to have no "executive, legislative or administrative" functions assigned to it, nor to have any authority over the Good Friday negotiations. It was permitted to consider, in a deliberative capacity, "any matter" referred to it by the negotiatiors.

== Election results ==
1996 Northern Ireland Forum election
- 30 May 1996

All 110 seats to the Northern Ireland Forum
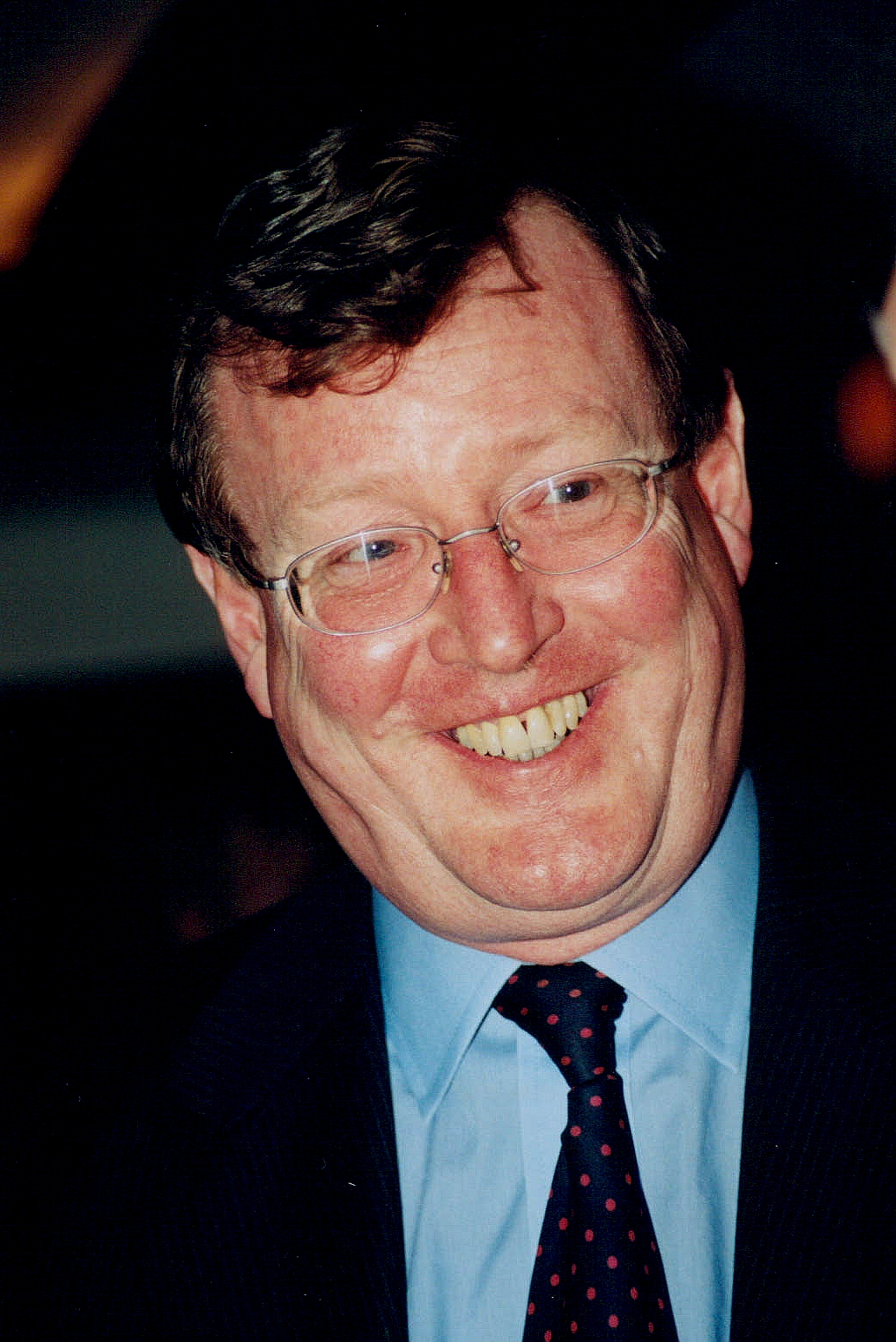

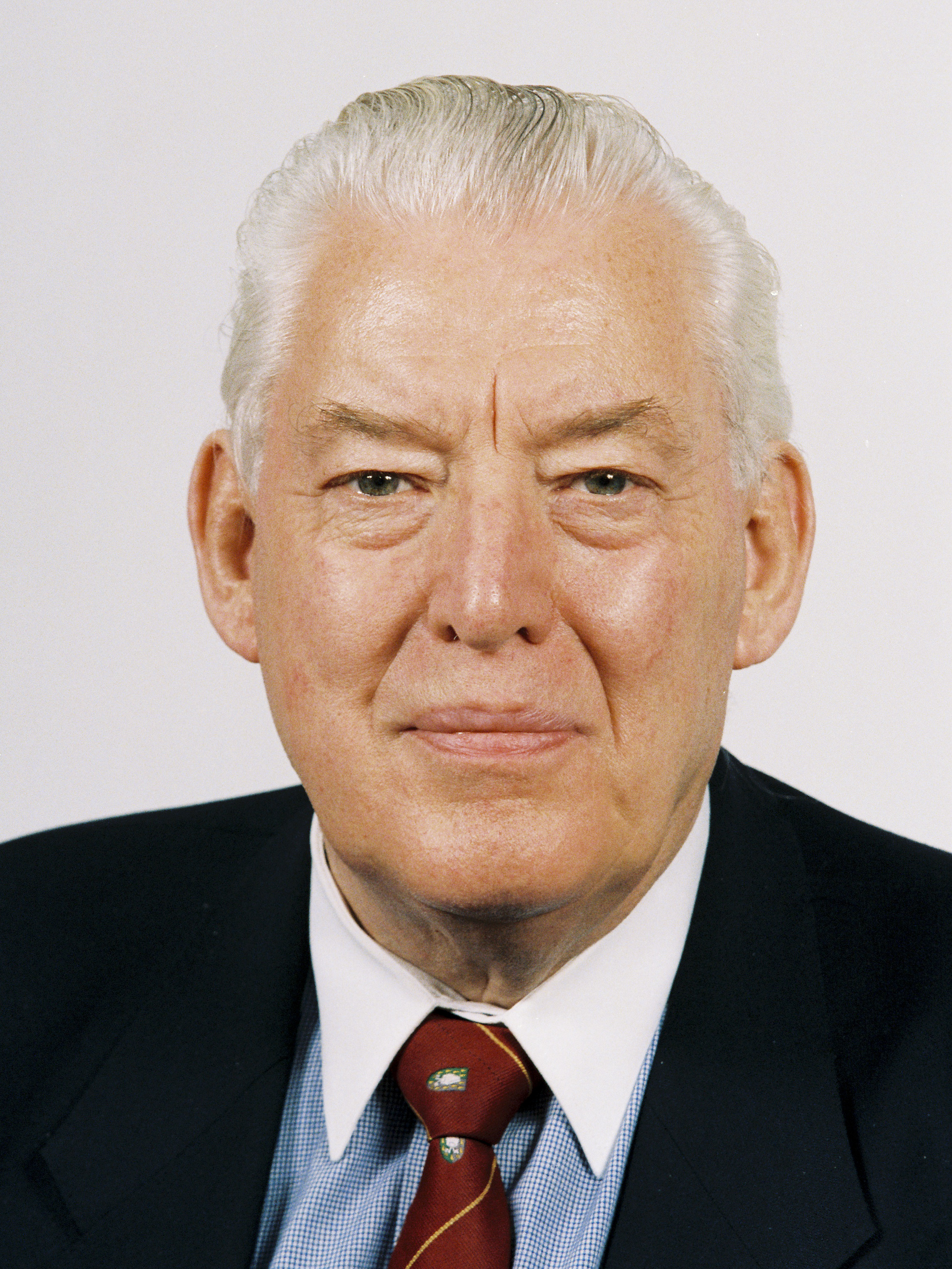

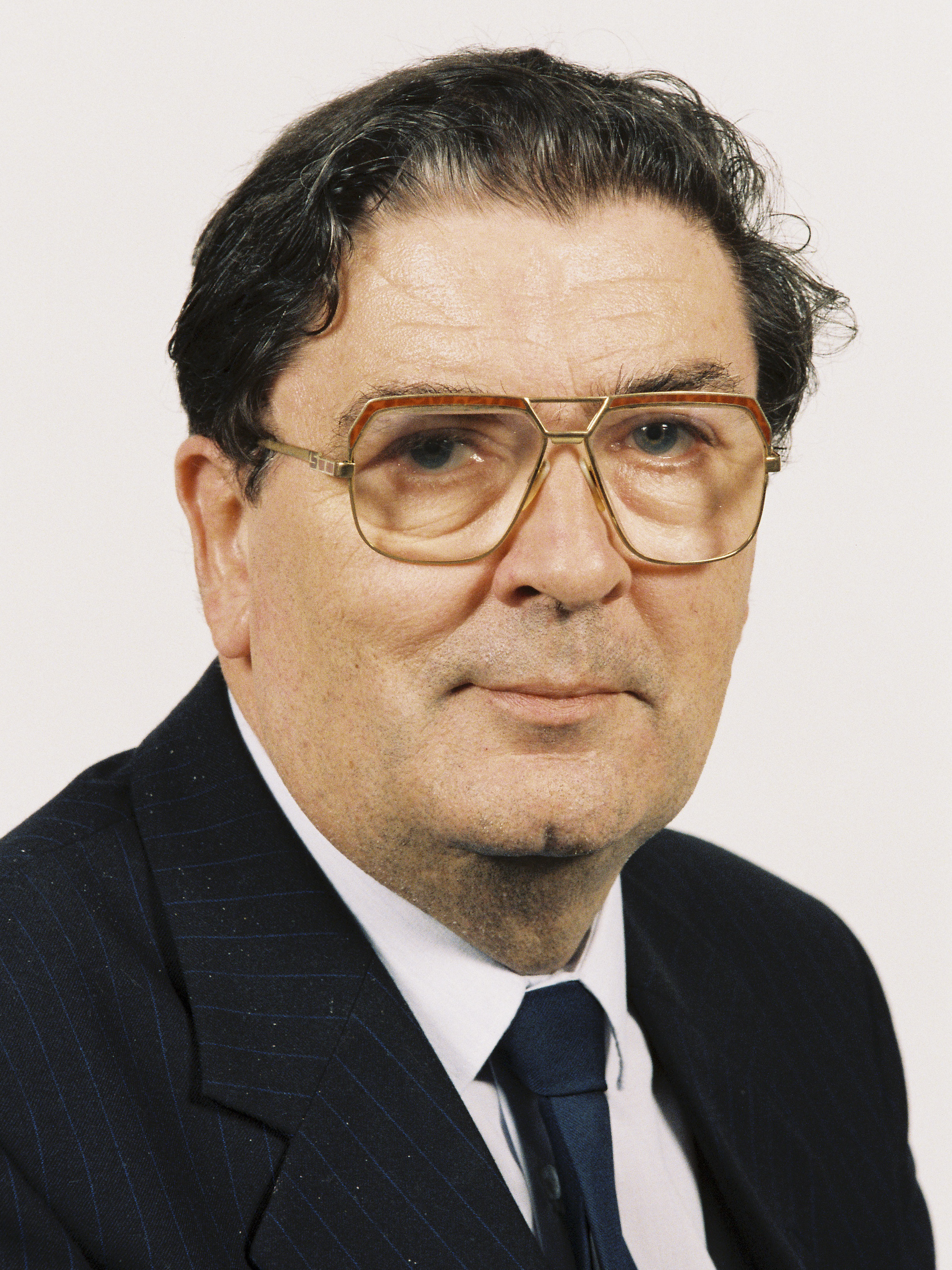

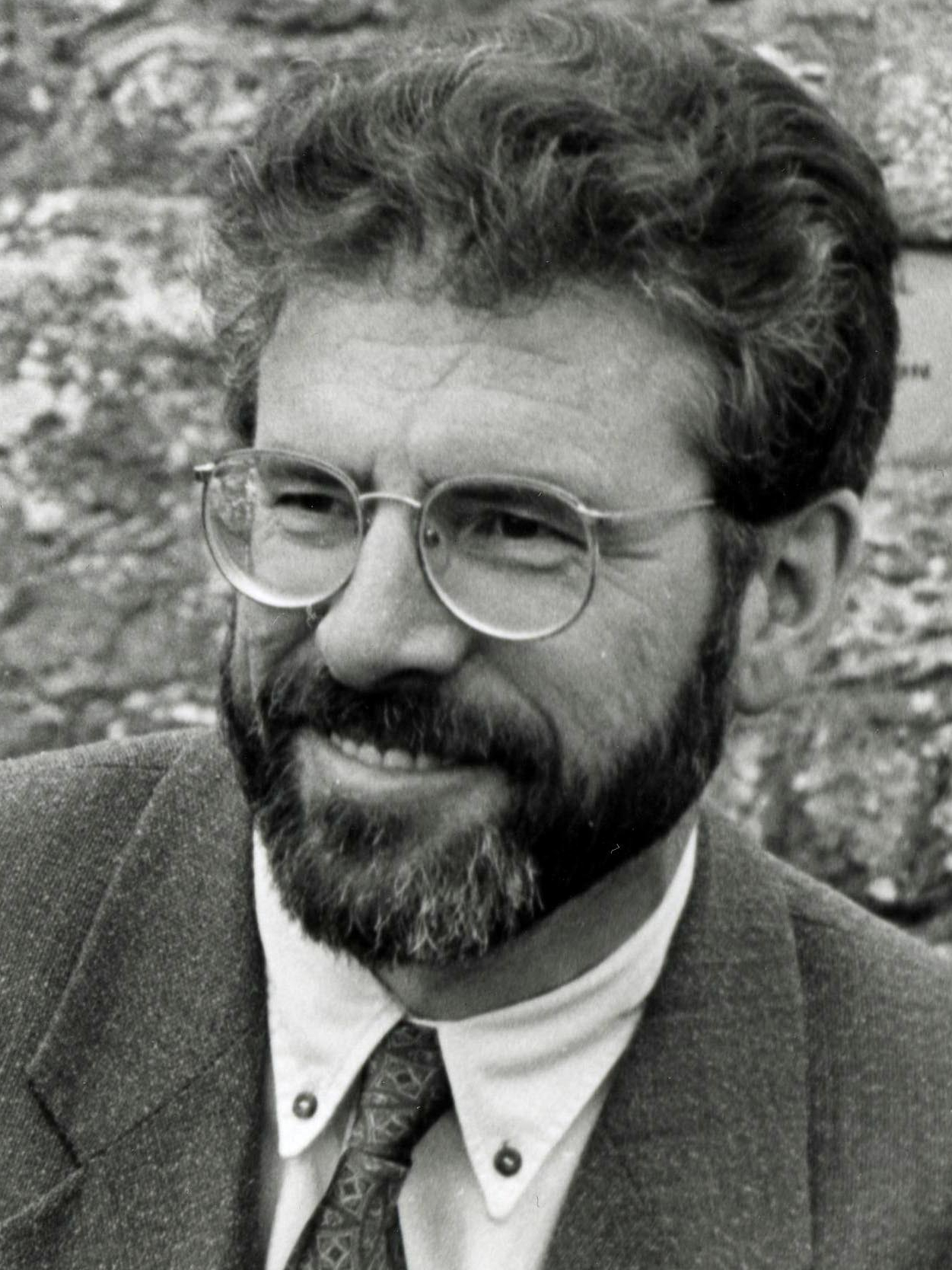

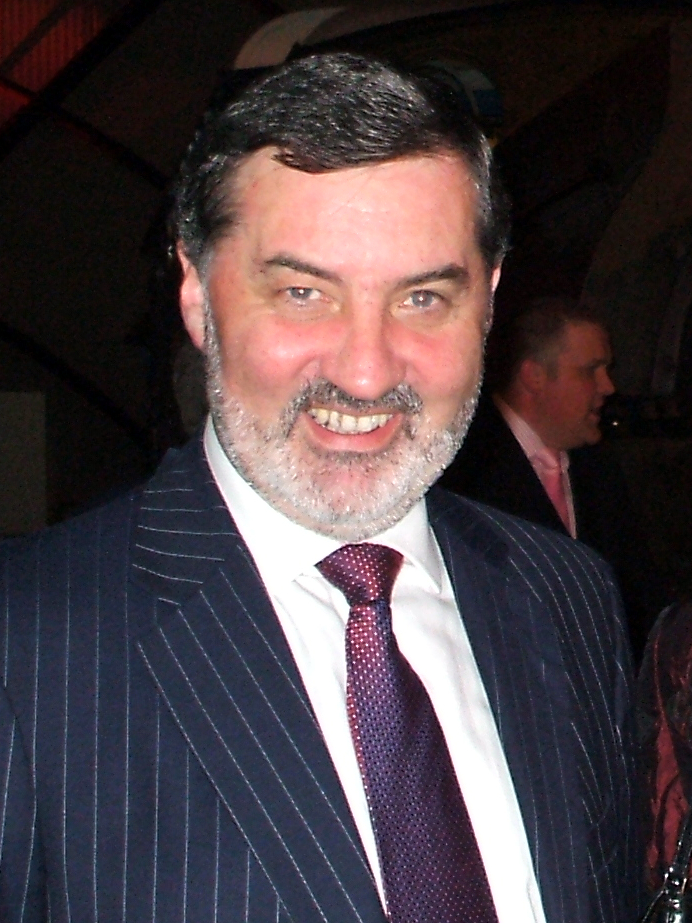
	First party	Second party	Third party
Leader	David Trimble	Ian Paisley	John Hume
Party	UUP	DUP	SDLP
Leader since	8 September 1995	30 September 1971	28 November 1979
Leader's seat	Upper Bann	North Antrim	Foyle
Seats won	30	24	21
Popular vote	181,829	141,413	160,786
Percentage	24.2%	18.8%	21.4%
	Fourth party	Fifth party
Leader	Gerry Adams	John Alderdice
Party	Sinn Féin	Alliance
Leader since	13 November 1983	3 October 1987
Leader's seat	West Belfast	East Belfast
Seats won	17	7
Popular vote	116,377	49,176
Percentage	15.5%	6.5%
- Election results. Voters elect 5 forum members from the 18 constituencies.
Chief Executive before election
None
Chief Executive after election
None

The results of the election were:

Party	Votes	Vote %	List seats	Top-up seats	Total seats	Seats %
UUP	181,829	24.2	28	2	30	27.3
SDLP	160,786	21.4	19	2	21	19.1
DUP	141,413	18.8	22	2	24	21.8
Sinn Féin	116,377	15.5	15	2	17	15.5
Alliance	49,176	6.5	5	2	7	6.4
UK Unionist	27,774	3.7	1	2	3	2.7
PUP	26,082	3.5	0	2	2	1.8
Ulster Democratic	16,715	2.2	0	2	2	1.8
NI Women's Coalition	7,731	1.0	0	2	2	1.8
Labour coalition	6,425	0.9	0	2	2	1.8
Green (NI)	3,647	0.5	0	0	0	
NI Conservatives	3,595	0.5	0	0	0	
Workers' Party	3,530	0.5	0	0	0	
Ulster Independence	2,125	0.5	0	0	0	
Democratic Left	1,215	0.2	0	0	0	
Democratic Partnership	1,046	0.1	0	0	0	
Independent McMullan	927	0.1	0	0	0	
Independent Chambers	567	0.1	0	0	0	
Natural Law	389	0.1	0	0	0	
Independent DUP	388	0.1	0	0	0	
Independent Arthur Templeton	350	0.1	0	0	0	
Independent Voice	204	0.0	0	0	0	
Communist	66	0.0	0	0	0	
Ulster Christian Democrats	31	0.0	0	0	0	
Total	745,296		90	20	110	

All parties shown.

Note: The Democratic Unionist Party was listed on the ballot paper as "Democratic Unionist Party DUP Ian Paisley"

Ulster Unionist Party: 30 seats Democratic Unionist Party: 24 seats Social Democratic and Labour Party: 21 seats Sinn Féin: 17 seats Alliance: 7 seats UKUP: 3 seats Ulster Democratic: 2 seats NI Women's Coalition: 2 seats Labour: 2 seats PUP: 2 seats

=== List candidates ===
Top-up candidates were elected from lists supplied by each party. The highest-placed candidates who had not already won election through a constituency won the top-up seats. In the table below, the top-up candidates elected through the regional list are shown in bold, while candidates elected in constituencies are shown in italics. Candidates in normal type were not elected.

Party	Regional list candidates
UUP	David Trimble, John Taylor, **John Gorman**, **Antony Alcock**, Jack Allen, Fred Parkinson, Josias Cunningham, Dennis Rogan, James Cooper, Jim Nicholson
SDLP	John Hume, Seamus Mallon, Eddie McGrady, Joe Hendron, **Jonathan Stephenson**, **Dorita Field**, Margaret Ellen, Patricia Walsh, Marietta Farrell, Rosaleen Hughes, Anne McQuillan
DUP	Ian Paisley, Peter Robinson, William McCrea, Nigel Dodds, Sammy Wilson, **Gregory Campbell**, **Eric Smyth**, Ruth Allen, Harry Smith, William McClure
Sinn Féin	**Lucilita Bhreatnach**, **Pat Doherty**, Rita O'Hare, Gerry Adams, Martin McGuinness, Bairbre de Brún, Mitchel McLaughlin, Gearóid Ó hEára, Joe Cahill, Dodie McGuinness
Alliance	John Alderdice, **Seamus Close**, Sean Neeson, Steve McBride, **Eileen Bell**, Anne Gormley, Elizabeth McCaffrey, Mary Clark-Glass, Susan O'Brien, Wendy Watt
UK Unionist	Robert McCartney, **Cedric Wilson**, **Conor Cruise O'Brien**, Patrick Roche, Ronnie Crawford, Alan Field, Valerie Kinghan, Stephen Nicholl, Graeme Jardin, Freda Woods
PUP	**Hugh Smyth**, **David Ervine**, Billy Hutchinson, William Smith, David Kirk, Patricia Laverty, Dawn Purvis, Edward Kinner, Gusty Spence, Winston Churchill Rea
Ulster Democratic	**Gary McMichael**, **John White**, David Adams, Joe English, Tommy Kirkham, David Nicholl, Robert Girvan, Thomas English, Ester McCracken English, Elizabeth Cathcart McIlwaine
NI Women's Coalition	**Monica McWilliams**, **Pearl Sagar**, Anne Campbell, Kathleen Fearon, Sheila Fairon, Joan Cosgrove, Diane Greer, Brenda Callaghan, Felicity Huston, Mairead Abraham
Labour coalition	**Malachi Curran**, **Hugh Casey**, Mark Langhammer, John McLaughlin, Lucy Simpson, Peter Hadden, Margaret Lawrence, Fionnuala Harbinson, Michael Duffy, David Morrison
Green (NI)	Paddy McEvoy, Peter Emerson, Jenny Jones, Nuala Ahern, Molly Scott, Robin Harper
NI Conservatives	Barbara Finney, Esmond Birnie
Workers' Party	Tom French, John Lowry, Marian Donnelly, Ellen Rush, Margaret Smith, Tommy Owens, Brendan Heany, Eilish Duffy, Vivian Hutchinson, Michael McCorry
Ulster Independence	Hugh Ross, Josephine Fulton-Challis, Sandra Jones, Walter Millar, David Kerr, Dierdre Speer-White, Ken Kerr, Donal Casey, Kenneth McClinton, Norman McLelland
Democratic Left	Mary McMahon, Seamus Lynch, Patrick John McClean, Gerry Cullen, Veronica McEneaney, Frank McElroy, Teresa McVeigh, Jean Craig, Mary Vernon, Monica Hynds
Democratic Partnership	David Bleakley, Paul Smyth, Maureen McCaughan, Adrian McKinney, Pearl Snowden, Edwin Sloan, Charles McKee, William Lewis, Erin Tunney
Independent McMullan	Oliver McMullan, John Robb, John McDowell, Wesley H. Holmes, William Dunbar, William Cunning, Helen Craig, Philip Dugdale, Charles Maunsell, Sinead McMullan
Independent Chambers	Alan Chambers, Joseph Coggle, Mary Chambers, James Arbuthnot, Robert Irvine, Violet Chambers, Linda Chambers, William Chambers, Ruth Patty, Pearl Brown
Natural Law	James Anderson, Thomas Mullins, Richard Johnson, John Patrick Lyons, John Small
Independent DUP	Thomas Henry O'Brien, William Baxter, Cecil Braniff, Tara Martin Alexandra, Stuart William O'Brien
Independent Arthur Templeton	N/A
Independent Voice	Andrew Thompson, Sarah Thompson, Bernard McGrath, Susan McGrath, Edward Phillips, Trevor Richards, Christopher Carter, Fidelma Carter, Betty Carter, Susan Carter
Communist	N/A
Ulster Christian Democrats	N/A

=== Votes summary ===
Popular vote
Ulster Unionist	24.17%
SDLP	21.37%
DUP	18.8%
Sinn Féin	15.47%
Alliance	6.54%
United Kingdom Unionist	3.69%
Progressive Unionist	3.47%
Ulster Democratic	2.22%
Women's Coalition	1.03%
Labour	0.85%
Independent	0.3%
Other	2.09%

=== Seats summary ===
Parliamentary seats
Ulster Unionist	27.27%
SDLP	19.09%
DUP	21.82%
Sinn Féin	15.45%
Alliance	6.36%
United Kingdom Unionist	2.73%
Progressive Unionist	1.82%
Ulster Democratic	1.82%
Women's Coalition	1.82%
Labour	1.82%

=== Seats by constituency ===
Constituency	UUP	DUP	SDLP	SF	AP	UKUP	PUP	UDP	WC	Lab
Belfast East	2	**2**			1					
Belfast North	1	**2**	1	1						
Belfast South	**2**	1	1		1					
Belfast West			1	**4**						
East Antrim	**2**	2			1					
East Londonderry	**2**	2	1							
Fermanagh and South Tyrone	**2**	1	1	1						
Foyle			**3**	2						
Lagan Valley	**3**	2								
Mid Ulster	1	1	1	**2**						
Newry and Armagh	1		**2**	2						
North Antrim	2	**2**	1							
North Down	**2**	1			1	1				
South Antrim	**2**	2	1							
South Down	1		**3**	1						
Strangford	**2**	2			1					
Upper Bann	**2**	1	1	1						
West Tyrone	1	1	**2**	1						
Regional List	2	2	2	2	2	2	2	2	2	2
**Total**	**30**	24	21	17	7	3	2	2	2	2

=== Votes by constituency ===
Const.	UUP	SDLP	DUP	SF	AP	UKUP	PUP	UDP	WC	Lab	GPNI	Con	WP	UIM	DL	DP	OM	AC	NL	IDUP	AT	UIV	CPI	UCDP	Seats	Valid	Spoiled	Turnout	Electors
Belfast East	8,608	1,299	**11,270**	862	7,130	2,496	3,802	1,156	405	199	161	291	149	114	45	197		11	13	93			38		5	38,419	80	38,499	62,161
Belfast North	6,938	7,493	**7,778**	7,681	1,670	1,329	3,777	1,874	486	571	265		274	41	123		25	21	14			63			5	40,423	105	40,528	65,411
Belfast South	**8,617**	7,956	5,818	2,455	4,689	1,750	2,321	1,666	947	333	314	279	270	108	96	133		5	20					31	5	37,808	89	37,897	63,890
Belfast West	1,489	11,087	1,769	**22,355**	340		1,982	848	252	319	156	60	984	43	37			12	30	36		26	28		5	41,853	173	42,026	61,344
East Antrim	**10,036**	2,213	9,557	619	3,957	2,041	2,254	1,141	323	218	224	271	69	86	33	102	81	5	14	107					5	33,351	52	33,403	57,989
East Londonderry	**11,386**	7,451	8,768	3,413	2,107	1,040	652	728	375	241	186	208	75	100	45			5	14						5	36,794	99	36,893	58,471
Fermanagh and South Tyrone	**15,542**	10,399	6,589	11,666	831	468	410	464	461	297	208	113	199	189	128		118	36	23						5	48,141	214	48,355	63,716
Foyle	4,553	**19,997**	5,054	11,618	790	324	580	497	695	544	191	92	81	65	40			22	41						5	45,184	124	45,308	66,598
Lagan Valley	**16,367**	4,001	9,592	1,132	4,508	2,252	1,072	3,007	520	143	175	386	72	164	43			3	18						5	43,455	27	43,482	70,045
Mid Ulster	7,935	12,492	7,243	**13,001**	549	435	380	375	259	271	132	119	210	263	41	93		20	24						5	43,842	159	44,001	57,683
Newry and Armagh	11,047	**16,775**	4,774	12,585	1,037	474	640	257	356	262	205	131	208	173	46	114		12	31	55					5	49,182	165	49,347	69,887
North Antrim	11,195	7,185	**16,448**	2,579	2,518	1,185	665	768	272	187	150	259	60	167	40	114	670	13	14						5	44,489	71	44,560	71,799
North Down	**9,270**	1,798	6,699	275	6,186	7,579	1,694	651	496	171	283	444	60	49	95			334	15	97		49			5	36,245	26	36,271	62,810
South Antrim	**12,001**	6,025	9,549	2,149	3,332	2,111	1,697	1,000	435	236	197	246	104	89	119	105	33	3	16		350				5	39,797	77	39,874	68,898
South Down	10,379	**20,220**	5,060	6,142	1,685		497	404	464	927	251	197	162	130	65	117		18	30						5	46,748	143	46,891	69,035
Strangford	**12,547**	2,927	11,584	709	4,614	3,112	2,017	1,080	410	202	213	380	73	57	53			13	13			66			5	40,070	44	40,114	69,093
Upper Bann	**16,592**	9,846	7,134	5,620	2,152	886	1,404	402	390	512	178		311	180	36	71		4	14						5	45,732	49	45,781	69,928
West Tyrone	7,327	**11,622**	6,727	11,516	1,081	292	238	397	185	792	158	119	169	107	130			30	45						5	40,935	211	41,146	57,348
**Northern Ireland**	**181,829**	160,786	141,413	116,377	49,176	27,774	26,082	16,715	7,731	6,425	3,647	3,595	3,530	2,125	1,215	1,046	927	567	389	388	350	204	66	31	110	752,468	1,908	754,376	1,166,106

=== Vote share by constituency ===
Const.	UUP	SDLP	DUP	SF	AP	UKUP	PUP	UDP	WC	Lab	GPNI	Con	WP	UIM	DL	DP	OM	AC	NL	IDUP	AT	UIV	CPI	UCDP	Seats	Valid	Spoiled	Turnout	Electors
Belfast East	22.41%	3.38%	**29.33%**	2.24%	18.56%	6.50%	9.90%	3.01%	1.05%	0.52%	0.42%	0.76%	0.39%	0.30%	0.12%	0.51%		0.03%	0.03%	0.24%			0.10%		5	99.79%	0.21%	61.93%	100.00%
Belfast North	17.16%	18.54%	**19.24%**	19.00%	4.13%	3.29%	9.34%	4.64%	1.20%	1.41%	0.66%		0.68%	0.10%	0.30%		0.06%	0.05%	0.03%			0.16%			5	99.74%	0.26%	61.96%	100.00%
Belfast South	**22.79%**	21.04%	15.39%	6.49%	12.40%	4.63%	6.14%	4.41%	2.50%	0.88%	0.83%	0.74%	0.71%	0.29%	0.25%	0.35%		0.01%	0.05%					0.08%	5	99.77%	0.23%	59.32%	100.00%
Belfast West	3.56%	26.49%	4.23%	**53.41%**	0.81%		4.74%	2.03%	0.60%	0.76%	0.37%	0.14%	2.35%	0.10%	0.09%			0.03%	0.07%	0.09%		0.06%	0.07%		5	99.59%	0.41%	68.51%	100.00%
East Antrim	**30.09%**	6.64%	28.66%	1.86%	11.86%	6.12%	6.76%	3.42%	0.97%	0.65%	0.67%	0.81%	0.21%	0.26%	0.10%	0.31%	0.24%	0.01%	0.04%	0.32%					5	99.84%	0.16%	57.60%	100.00%
East Londonderry	**30.95%**	20.25%	23.83%	9.28%	5.73%	2.83%	1.77%	1.98%	1.02%	0.65%	0.51%	0.57%	0.20%	0.27%	0.12%			0.01%	0.04%						5	99.73%	0.27%	63.10%	100.00%
Fermanagh and South Tyrone	**32.28%**	21.60%	13.69%	24.23%	1.73%	0.97%	0.85%	0.96%	0.96%	0.62%	0.43%	0.23%	0.41%	0.39%	0.27%		0.25%	0.07%	0.05%						5	99.56%	0.44%	75.89%	100.00%
Foyle	10.08%	**44.26%**	11.19%	25.71%	1.75%	0.72%	1.28%	1.10%	1.54%	1.20%	0.42%	0.20%	0.18%	0.14%	0.09%			0.05%	0.09%						5	99.73%	0.27%	68.03%	100.00%
Lagan Valley	**37.66%**	9.21%	22.07%	2.60%	10.37%	5.18%	2.47%	6.92%	1.20%	0.33%	0.40%	0.89%	0.17%	0.38%	0.10%			0.01%	0.04%						5	99.94%	0.06%	62.08%	100.00%
Mid Ulster	18.10%	28.49%	16.52%	**29.65%**	1.25%	0.99%	0.87%	0.86%	0.59%	0.62%	0.30%	0.27%	0.48%	0.60%	0.09%	0.21%		0.05%	0.05%						5	99.64%	0.36%	76.28%	100.00%
Newry and Armagh	22.46%	**34.11%**	9.71%	25.59%	2.11%	0.96%	1.30%	0.52%	0.72%	0.53%	0.42%	0.27%	0.42%	0.35%	0.09%	0.23%		0.02%	0.06%	0.11%					5	99.67%	0.33%	70.61%	100.00%
North Antrim	25.16%	16.15%	**36.97%**	5.80%	5.66%	2.66%	1.49%	1.73%	0.61%	0.42%	0.34%	0.58%	0.13%	0.38%	0.09%	0.26%	1.51%	0.03%	0.03%						5	99.84%	0.16%	62.06%	100.00%
North Down	**25.58%**	4.96%	18.48%	0.76%	17.07%	20.91%	4.67%	1.80%	1.37%	0.47%	0.78%	1.22%	0.17%	0.14%	0.26%			0.92%	0.04%	0.27%		0.14%			5	99.93%	0.07%	57.75%	100.00%
South Antrim	**30.16%**	15.14%	23.99%	5.40%	8.37%	5.30%	4.26%	2.51%	1.09%	0.59%	0.50%	0.62%	0.26%	0.22%	0.30%	0.26%	0.08%	0.01%	0.04%		0.88%				5	99.81%	0.19%	57.87%	100.00%
South Down	22.20%	**43.25%**	10.82%	13.14%	3.60%		1.06%	0.86%	0.99%	1.98%	0.54%	0.42%	0.35%	0.28%	0.14%	0.25%		0.04%	0.06%						5	99.70%	0.30%	67.92%	100.00%
Strangford	**31.31%**	7.30%	28.91%	1.77%	11.51%	7.77%	5.03%	2.70%	1.02%	0.50%	0.53%	0.95%	0.18%	0.14%	0.13%			0.03%	0.03%			0.16%			5	99.89%	0.11%	58.06%	100.00%
Upper Bann	**36.28%**	21.53%	15.60%	12.29%	4.71%	1.94%	3.07%	0.88%	0.85%	1.12%	0.39%		0.68%	0.39%	0.08%	0.16%		0.01%	0.03%						5	99.89%	0.11%	65.47%	100.00%
West Tyrone	17.90%	**28.39%**	16.43%	28.13%	2.64%	0.71%	0.58%	0.97%	0.45%	1.93%	0.39%	0.29%	0.41%	0.26%	0.32%			0.07%	0.11%						5	99.49%	0.51%	71.75%	100.00%
**Northern Ireland**	**24.16%**	21.37%	18.79%	15.47%	6.54%	3.69%	3.47%	2.22%	1.03%	0.85%	0.48%	0.48%	0.47%	0.28%	0.16%	0.14%	0.12%	0.08%	0.05%	0.05%	0.05%	0.03%	0.01%	0.00%	110	99.75%	0.25%	64.69%	100.00%

== Suspension, revival and abolition ==
Under section 7 of the Northern Ireland (Entry to Negotiations, etc) Act, it was possible for the Forum to be suspended and revived as necessary via statutory Order, subject to a sunset date of 31 May 1997 when section 3, the provision detailing the existence of the Forum, would be automatically repealed, and the Forum abolished. However, this date could itself be extended via statutory Order, but could not be set after 31 May 1998.

These powers were made use of several times:

- The Northern Ireland (Entry to Negotiations, etc) Act 1996 (Cessation of Section 3) Order 1997, which suspended the Forum effective 22 March 1997,
- The Northern Ireland (Entry to Negotiations, etc) Act 1996 (Revival of Section 3) Order 1997, which revived the Forum effective 3 June 1997 and extended its existence to the latest possible permitted date, 31 May 1998, and,
- The Northern Ireland (Entry to Negotiations, etc) Act 1996 (Cessation of Section 3) Order 1998, which abolished the Forum effective 25 April 1998, upon the conclusion of the negotiations for the Good Friday Agreement.

== Bibliography ==
- Northern Ireland (Entry to Negotiations, etc) Act 1996
- The 1996 Forum Elections and the Peace Process by Nicholas Whyte
