= 2001 Omagh District Council election =

Local govt election in Northern Ireland

← 1997	7 June 2001	2005 →

All 21 seats to Omagh District Council 11 seats needed for a majority
	First party	Second party	Third party
Party	Sinn Féin	SDLP	UUP
Seats won	8	6	3
Seat change	▲2	0	▼1
	Fourth party	Fifth party	Sixth party
Party	DUP	Independent	Alliance
Seats won	2	2	0
Seat change	▼1	▲2	▼1
	Seventh party
Party	Labour Coalition
Seats won	0
Seat change	▼1
- Party with the most votes by district.

Elections to Omagh District Council were held on 7 June 2001 on the same day as the other Northern Irish local government elections. The election used three district electoral areas to elect a total of 21 councillors.

== Election results ==
Omagh District Council Election Result 2001
Party	Seats	Gains	Losses	Net gain/loss	Seats %	Votes %	Votes	+/−
Sinn Féin	8	2	0	▲2	38.1	40.4	10,771	▲9.0
SDLP	6	0	0	0	28.6	22.0	5,848	▼1.2
UUP	3	0	1	▼1	14.3	15.6	4,158	▼3.3
DUP	2	0	1	▼1	9.5	13.5	3,592	▼1.1
Independent	2	2	0	▲2	9.5	7.7	2,054	▲7.7
Workers' Party	0	0	0	0	0.0	0.8	211	▼1.2

Note: "Votes" are the first preference votes.

== Districts summary ==
Results of the Omagh District Council election, 2001 by district
Ward	%	Cllrs	%	Cllrs	%	Cllrs	%	Cllrs	%	Cllrs	Total Cllrs
Ward	Sinn Féin		SDLP		UUP		DUP		Others		Total Cllrs
Mid Tyrone	56.5	4	20.7	2	12.5	1	10.3	0	0.0	0	7
Omagh Town	23.6	1	15.8	2	23.2	1	22.8	1	14.6	2	7
West Tyrone	38.3	3	22.6	2	19.8	1	14.8	1	4.5	0	7
Total	40.4	8	22.0	6	15.6	3	13.5	2	8.5	2	21

== District results ==
=== Mid Tyrone ===
1997: 3 x Sinn Féin, 2 x SDLP, 1 x UUP
2001: 4 x Sinn Féin, 2 x SDLP, 1 x UUP, 1 x DUP
1997-2001 Change: Sinn Féin gain from DUP

Mid Tyrone - 7 seats
Party	Candidate	FPv%	Count				
Party	Candidate	FPv%	1	2	3	4	5
Sinn Féin	Sean Clarke*	15.14%	1,446				
Sinn Féin	Damien Curran	13.02%	1,244				
Sinn Féin	Michael McAnespie*	10.42%	995	1,007.78	1,626.78		
Sinn Féin	Barney McAleer	9.60%	917	1,128.68	1,214.68		
UUP	Bert Wilson	12.47%	1,191	1,191	1,191	1,191	1,191.44
SDLP	Seamus Shields*	10.35%	989	993.14	1,029.32	1,128.32	1,158.24
SDLP	Gerry O'Doherty	10.41%	994	1,002.46	1,015.36	1,045.36	1,063.4
DUP	Samuel McFarland	10.30%	984	984	985	987	987.66
Sinn Féin	Cathal McCrory	8.28%	791	795.86			
Electorate: 11,421 Valid: 9,551 (83.63%) Spoilt: 198 Quota: 1,194 Turnout: 9,749 (85.36%)

=== Omagh Town ===
1997: 2 x SDLP, 1 x Sinn Féin, 1 x DUP, 1 x UUP, 1 x Alliance, 1 x Labour Coalition
2001: 2 x SDLP, 2 x Independent, 1 x Sinn Féin, 1 x DUP, 1 x UUP
1997-2001 Change: Independents (two seats) leave SDLP and Labour Coalition, SDLP gain from Alliance

Omagh Town - 7 seats
Party	Candidate	FPv%	Count							
Party	Candidate	FPv%	1	2	3	4	5	6	7	8
Sinn Féin	Sean Begley	14.08%	1,123							
DUP	Oliver Gibson*	13.63%	1,087							
Independent	Patrick McGowan*	13.47%	1,074							
SDLP	Joe Byrne*	12.63%	1,007							
UUP	Reuben McKelvey*	7.70%	614	614	688	733.18	1,223.18			
Independent	Johnny McLaughlin*	9.52%	759	764.17	813.39	817.44	875.04	1,021.74		
SDLP	Josephine Deehan	7.89%	629	632.19	758.84	759.29	767.64	844.14	898.64	921.39
Sinn Féin	Paddy Gallagher	9.57%	763	867.61	886.16	886.25	886.34	887.24	906.54	906.89
UUP	John Anderson	6.92%	552	552	611	645.65				
SDLP	Vincent Campbell*	2.23%	178	181.74						
DUP	Thomas McCordick	2.14%	171	171						
Independent	Kevin Taylor	0.24%	19	19.22						
Electorate: 11,036 Valid: 7,976 (72.27%) Spoilt: 222 Quota: 998 Turnout: 8,198 (74.28%)

=== West Tyrone ===
1997: 2 x Sinn Féin, 2 x SDLP, 2 x UUP, 1 x DUP
2001: 3 x Sinn Féin, 2 x SDLP, 1 x DUP, 1 x UUP
1997-2001 Change: Sinn Féin gain from UUP

West Tyrone - 7 seats
Party	Candidate	FPv%	Count							
Party	Candidate	FPv%	1	2	3	4	5	6	7	8
SDLP	Patrick McDonnell*	15.07%	1,372							
Sinn Féin	Barry McElduff	14.01%	1,276							
UUP	Allan Rainey*	12.46%	1,135	1,136.19	1,136.41	1,140.41				
DUP	Thomas Buchanan*	12.00%	1,093	1,093.34	1,093.34	1,099.34	1,334.34			
Sinn Féin	Peter Kelly	9.21%	839	856.85	884.13	894.58	925.47	925.47	1,331.47	
Sinn Féin	Patrick Watters	8.38%	763	771.16	780.18	788.23	796.62	796.62	961.65	1,132.75
SDLP	Liam McQuaid*	7.46%	679	843.05	851.08	889.77	985.68	986.68	1,057.61	1,074.72
UUP	David Sterritt	7.31%	666	666.17	666.17	668.17	689.51	861.51	861.51	862.69
Sinn Féin	Damien McCrossan	6.74%	614	622.67	696.37	728.91	750.41	751.41		
Workers' Party	Tommy Owens	2.32%	211	222.05	227.44	280.79				
DUP	Stephen Harpur	2.82%	257	257.34	257.34	258.34				
Independent	Gerry McMenamin	2.22%	202	210.67	219.8					
Electorate: 11,005 Valid: 9,107 (82.75%) Spoilt: 179 Quota: 1,139 Turnout: 9,286 (84.38%)
