= 2005 Omagh District Council election =

Local govt election in Northern Ireland

← 2001	5 May 2005	2011 →

All 21 seats to Omagh District Council 11 seats needed for a majority
	First party	Second party	Third party
Party	Sinn Féin	SDLP	DUP
Seats won	10	3	3
Seat change	▲2	▼3	▲1
	Fourth party	Fifth party
Party	UUP	Independent
Seats won	3	2
Seat change	0	0
- Party with the most votes by district.

Elections to Omagh District Council were held on 5 May 2005 on the same day as the other Northern Irish local government elections. The election used three district electoral areas to elect a total of 21 councillors.

== Election results ==
Omagh District Council Election Result 2005
Party	Seats	Gains	Losses	Net gain/loss	Seats %	Votes %	Votes	+/−
Sinn Féin	10	2	0	▲2	47.6	44.6	10,862	▲4.2
SDLP	3	0	3	▼3	14.3	19.3	4,707	▼2.7
DUP	3	1	0	▲1	14.3	16.7	4,074	▲3.2
UUP	3	0	0	0	14.3	13.0	3,168	▼2.6
Independent	2	0	0	0	9.5	6.3	1,526	▼1.4

Note: "Votes" are the first preference votes.

== Districts summary ==
Results of the Omagh District Council election, 2005 by district
Ward	%	Cllrs	%	Cllrs	%	Cllrs	%	Cllrs	%	Cllrs	Total Cllrs
Ward	Sinn Féin		SDLP		DUP		UUP		Others		Total Cllrs
Mid Tyrone	57.8	4	19.0	1	11.2	1	12.1	1	0.0	0	7
Omagh Town	25.5	2	20.9	1	18.7	1	12.3	1	22.6	2	7
West Tyrone	46.0	4	18.5	1	21.0	1	14.5	1	0.0	0	7
Total	44.6	10	19.3	3	16.7	3	13.0	3	6.4	2	21

== District results ==
=== Mid Tyrone ===
2001: 4 x Sinn Féin, 2 x SDLP, 1 x UUP
2005: 4 x Sinn Féin, 1 x SDLP, 1 x UUP, 1 x DUP
2001-2005 Change: DUP gain from SDLP

Mid Tyrone - 7 seats
Party	Candidate	FPv%	Count				
Party	Candidate	FPv%	1	2	3	4	5
Sinn Féin	Sean Clarke*	16.51%	1,480				
Sinn Féin	Michael McAnespie*	13.42%	1,203				
Sinn Féin	Declan McAleer	9.54%	855	1,130.75			
SDLP	Seamus Shields*	11.25%	1,008	1,017.5	1,023.38	1,578.38	
UUP	Bert Wilson*	12.09%	1,084	1,084	1,084	1,094.57	1,155.57
Sinn Féin	Sharon O'Brien	10.04%	900	925.75	938.49	964.23	1,039.23
DUP	Charles Chittick	11.16%	1,000	1,000.25	1,000.39	1,000.64	1,008.64
Sinn Féin	Cathal McCrory	8.27%	741	763.5	820.48	856.18	935.18
SDLP	Gerry O'Doherty*	7.72%	692	710.75	712.99		
Electorate: 11,549 Valid: 8,963 (77.61%) Spoilt: 187 Quota: 1,121 Turnout: 9,150 (79.23%)

=== Omagh Town ===
2001: 2 x SDLP, 2 x Independent, 1 x Sinn Féin, 1 x DUP, 1 x UUP
2005: 2 x Sinn Féin, 2 x Independent, 1 x SDLP, 1 x DUP, 1 x UUP
2001-2005 Change: Sinn Féin gain from SDLP

Omagh Town - 7 seats
Party	Candidate	FPv%	Count			
Party	Candidate	FPv%	1	2	3	4
DUP	Clive McFarland	18.71%	1,264			
Sinn Féin	Sean Begley*	17.07%	1,153			
Independent	Patrick McGowan*	13.10%	885			
SDLP	Josephine Deehan*	12.76%	862			
UUP	Ross Hussey	12.30%	831	1,213.68		
Independent	Johnny McLaughlin*	9.49%	641	671.96	858.08	
Sinn Féin	Martin McColgan	8.41%	568	568.72	569.08	832.11
SDLP	Joe Byrne*	8.16%	551	553.16	596.72	641.67
Electorate: 10,577 Valid: 6,755 (63.86%) Spoilt: 177 Quota: 845 Turnout: 6,932 (65.54%)

=== West Tyrone ===
2001: 3 x Sinn Féin, 2 x SDLP, 1 x DUP, 1 x UUP
2005: 4 x Sinn Féin, 1 x SDLP, 1 x DUP, 1 x UUP
2001-2005 Change: Sinn Féin gain from SDLP

West Tyrone - 7 seats
Party	Candidate	FPv%	Count						
Party	Candidate	FPv%	1	2	3	4	5	6	7
DUP	Thomas Buchanan*	21.00%	1,810						
Sinn Féin	Barry McElduff*	17.07%	1,471						
UUP	Allan Rainey*	8.53%	735	1,141.08					
SDLP	Patrick McDonnell*	12.30%	1,060	1,063.29	1,109.19				
Sinn Féin	Cecilia Quinn	11.41%	983	983.47	1,027.75	1,146.75			
Sinn Féin	Frankie Donnelly	9.17%	790	790	990.61	1,060.93	1,072.93	1,072.93	1,084.18
Sinn Féin	Peter Kelly*	8.33%	718	718	791.44	862.92	912.92	913.08	932.58
UUP	William Bleakley	6.01%	518	824.91	824.91	856.18	856.18	918.74	918.74
SDLP	Liam McQuaid*	6.20%	534	536.35	557.41				
Electorate: 11,153 Valid: 8,619 (77.28%) Spoilt: 173 Quota: 1,078 Turnout: 8,792 (78.83%)
