= 1993 Omagh District Council election =

Local govt election in Northern Ireland

← 1989	19 May 1993	1997 →

All 21 seats to Omagh District Council 11 seats needed for a majority
	First party	Second party	Third party
Party	Sinn Féin	SDLP	UUP
Seats won	6	5	4
Seat change	0	▼1	▼1
	Fourth party	Fifth party	Sixth party
Party	DUP	Alliance	Ind. Nationalist
Seats won	3	1	1
Seat change	0	▲1	0
	Seventh party
Party	Independent Labour
Seats won	1
Seat change	▲1
- Party with the most votes by district.

Elections to Omagh District Council were held on 19 May 1993 on the same day as the other Northern Irish local government elections. The election used three district electoral areas to elect a total of 21 councillors.

== Election results ==
Omagh District Council Election Result 1993
Party	Seats	Gains	Losses	Net gain/loss	Seats %	Votes %	Votes	+/−
Sinn Féin	6	0	0	0	28.6	24.3	5,338	▼0.6
SDLP	5	0	1	▼1	23.8	24.5	5,386	▼1.6
UUP	4	0	1	▼1	19.0	20.0	4,008	▼1.9
DUP	3	1	1	0	14.3	15.4	3,393	▲0.3
Alliance	1	1	0	▲1	4.8	5.0	1,092	▲1.3
Independent Labour	1	1	0	▲1	4.8	4.2	921	▲4.2
Ind. Nationalist	1	0	0	0	4.8	3.2	700	▼0.9
Workers' Party	0	0	0	0	0.0	1.9	422	▲2.3
Democratic Left	0	0	0	0	0.0	1.5	340	New

Note: "Votes" are the first preference votes.

== Districts summary ==
Results of the Omagh District Council election, 1993 by district
Ward	%	Cllrs	%	Cllrs	%	Cllrs	%	Cllrs	%	Cllrs	%	Cllrs	Total Cllrs
Ward	Sinn Féin		SDLP		UUP		DUP		Alliance		Others		Total Cllrs
Mid Tyrone	38.4	3	18.7	1	16.9	1	10.6	1	1.8	0	13.6	1	7
Omagh Town	12.0	1	25.1	2	16.1	1	20.6	1	11.6	1	14.6	1	7
West Tyrone	20.9	2	29.8	2	26.6	2	15.6	1	2.3	0	4.8	0	7
Total	24.3	6	24.5	5	20.0	4	15.4	3	5.0	1	10.8	2	21

== District results ==
=== Mid Tyrone ===
1989: 3 x Sinn Féin, 2 x UUP, 1 x SDLP, 1 x Independent Nationalist
1993: 3 x Sinn Féin, 1 x UUP, 1 x SDLP, 1 x DUP, 1 x Independent Nationalist
1989-1993 Change: DUP gain from UUP

Mid Tyrone - 7 seats
Party	Candidate	FPv%	Count									
Party	Candidate	FPv%	1	2	3	4	5	6	7	8	9	10
Sinn Féin	Patrick McMahon*	15.90%	1,216									
UUP	Desmond Anderson*	13.18%	1,008									
Sinn Féin	Barney McAleer*	11.52%	881	1,007.5								
Sinn Féin	Sean Clarke*	10.94%	837	936	936	936.15	983.31					
DUP	Drew Baxter	6.55%	501	501	505	515.3	515.3	515.3	784.65	788.65	1,004.65	
SDLP	Seamus Shields*	8.03%	614	630.94	644.16	644.91	646.71	650.85	651.9	747.56	753.21	934.3
Ind. Nationalist	Brian McGrath*	9.15%	700	705.06	728.06	728.21	728.48	733.07	733.07	789.38	794.68	863.92
SDLP	Nuala McSherry	6.20%	474	474.88	491.88	492.13	492.22	492.58	492.58	631.07	633.07	668.32
Democratic Left	Patrick McClean	4.45%	340	346.16	369.6	370.15	370.69	371.14	375.14	391.36	409.71	
UUP	William Oldcroft	3.77%	288	288	309	343.2	343.2	343.2	379.55	380.6		
SDLP	Patrick McLaughlin	4.43%	339	340.76	356.76	356.86	357.4	357.76	357.76			
DUP	Jim Patterson	4.09%	313	313	314	317.05	317.05	317.05				
Alliance	James Lagan	1.80%	138	138.88								
Electorate: 9,970 Valid: 7,649 (76.72%) Spoilt: 228 Quota: 957 Turnout: 7,877 (79.01%)

=== Omagh Town ===
1989: 3 x SDLP, 2 x DUP, 1 x UUP, 1 x Sinn Féin
1993: 2 x SDLP, 1 x DUP, 1 x UUP, 1 x Sinn Féin, 1 x Alliance, 1 x Independent Labour
1989-1993 Change: Alliance gain from DUP, Independent Labour leaves SDLP

Omagh Town - 7 seats
Party	Candidate	FPv%	Count								
Party	Candidate	FPv%	1	2	3	4	5	6	7	8	9
DUP	Oliver Gibson*	14.83%	995								
SDLP	Patrick McGowan*	14.01%	940								
Independent Labour	Johnny McLaughlin*	13.73%	921								
UUP	Wilfred Breen*	12.05%	808	835.36	839.36						
Alliance	Ann Gormley	7.50%	503	504.12	516.12	528	547.03	771.1	837.92	878.92	
Sinn Féin	Francis Mackey*	12.03%	807	807	811	815.62	835.53	837.64	838.75	863.75	
SDLP	Joe Byrne	6.41%	430	430.32	435.32	461.72	470.74	477.83	480.27	751.07	768.07
DUP	Ivan Burnside	5.81%	390	498.48	499.48	499.48	501.46	506.46	693.24	693.35	693.35
SDLP	Stephen McKenna*	4.68%	314	314.32	327.32	378.58	401.46	404.28	407.6		
UUP	Reuben McKelvey	4.04%	271	286.52	289.52	290.4	293.26	321.23			
Alliance	Ethne McClelland	4.10%	275	276.76	279.76	282.29	286.03				
Workers' Party	Hugh Mullin	0.81%	54	54							
Electorate: 10,799 Valid: 6,708 (62.12%) Spoilt: 179 Quota: 839 Turnout: 6,887 (63.77%)

=== West Tyrone ===
1989: 2 x SDLP, 2 x UUP, 2 x Sinn Féin, 1 x DUP
1993: 2 x SDLP, 2 x UUP, 2 x Sinn Féin, 1 x DUP
1989-1993 Change: No change

West Tyrone - 7 seats
Party	Candidate	FPv%	Count						
Party	Candidate	FPv%	1	2	3	4	5	6	7
DUP	Thomas Buchanan	15.62%	1,194						
SDLP	Liam McQuaid*	15.60%	1,192						
UUP	Arthur McFarland*	14.95%	1,143						
UUP	Allan Rainey*	7.99%	611	779.59	780.64	933.44	973.44		
Sinn Féin	Gerry McMenamin*	11.72%	896	896.46	903.81	903.81	907.81	910.81	957.81
SDLP	John Duffy	7.72%	590	590.23	661.21	661.37	694.37	707.44	884.55
Sinn Féin	Patrick Watters	9.17%	701	701.46	719.52	719.68	719.68	721.47	762.46
SDLP	James Connolly	6.45%	493	493.69	597.43	597.91	619.65	638.57	698.26
Workers' Party	Tommy Owens	4.81%	368	368.92	395.59	396.07	431.12	456.1	
UUP	William Wilson	3.65%	279	338.34	339.6	362.8	383.3		
Alliance	Eric Bullick	2.30%	176	181.75	185.11	187.03			
Electorate: 10,209 Valid: 7,643 (74.87%) Spoilt: 200 Quota: 956 Turnout: 7,843 (76.82%)
