= 1997 Omagh District Council election =

Local govt election in Northern Ireland

← 1993	21 May 1997	2001 →

All 21 seats to Omagh District Council 11 seats needed for a majority
	First party	Second party	Third party
Party	Sinn Féin	SDLP	UUP
Seats won	6	6	4
Seat change	0	▲1	0
	Fourth party	Fifth party	Sixth party
Party	DUP	Alliance	Labour Coalition
Seats won	3	1	1
Seat change	0	0	▲1
	Seventh party	Eighth party
Party	Independent Labour	Ind. Nationalist
Seats won	0	0
Seat change	▼1	▼1
- Results by district electoral area, shaded by First Preference Votes.

Elections to Omagh District Council were held on 21 May 1997 on the same day as the other Northern Irish local government elections. The election used three district electoral areas to elect a total of 21 councillors.

== Election results ==
Omagh District Council Election Result 1997
Party	Seats	Gains	Losses	Net gain/loss	Seats %	Votes %	Votes	+/−
Sinn Féin	6	0	0	0	28.6	31.4	7,024	▲7.1
SDLP	6	1	0	▲1	28.6	23.2	5,183	▼1.3
UUP	4	0	0	0	19.0	18.9	4,223	▼1.1
DUP	3	0	0	0	14.3	14.6	3,259	▼0.8
Alliance	1	0	0	0	4.8	3.3	744	▼1.7
Labour Coalition	1	1	0	▲1	4.8	3.2	711	New
Ind. Nationalist	0	0	1	▼1	0.0	2.5	554	▼0.7
Workers' Party	0	0	0	0	0.0	2.0	457	▲0.1
Democratic Left	0	0	0	0	0.0	0.7	148	▼0.8
Ulster Independence	0	0	0	0	0.0	0.2	42	New

Note: "Votes" are the first preference votes.

== Districts summary ==
Results of the Omagh District Council election, 1997 by district
Ward	%	Cllrs	%	Cllrs	%	Cllrs	%	Cllrs	%	Cllrs	%	Cllrs	%	Cllrs	Total Cllrs
Ward	Sinn Féin		SDLP		UUP		DUP		Alliance		Labour		Others		Total Cllrs
Mid Tyrone	47.1	3	18.9	2	14.6	1	10.1	1	0.7	0	0.0	0	8.6	0	7
Omagh Town	20.0	1	26.9	2	16.2	1	20.3	1	7.2	1	8.8	1	0.6	0	7
West Tyrone	24.3	2	24.7	2	25.8	2	14.6	1	2.8	0	1.8	0	6.0	0	7
Total	31.4	6	23.2	6	18.9	4	14.6	3	3.3	1	3.2	1	5.4	0	21

== District results ==
=== Mid Tyrone ===
1993: 3 x Sinn Féin, 1 x SDLP, 1 x UUP, 1 x DUP, 1 x Independent Nationalist
1997: 3 x Sinn Féin, 2 x SDLP, 1 x UUP, 1 x DUP
1993-1997 Change: SDLP gain from Independent Nationalist

Mid Tyrone - 7 seats
Party	Candidate	FPv%	Count							
Party	Candidate	FPv%	1	2	3	4	5	6	7	8
Sinn Féin	Patrick McMahon*	16.77%	1,375							
Sinn Féin	Sean Clarke*	13.77%	1,129							
UUP	Desmond Anderson*	12.51%	1,026							
Sinn Féin	Michael McAnespie	11.95%	980	1,148.48						
SDLP	Joe Byrne*	9.84%	807	811.68	813.77	817.01	835.01	857.46	868.46	1,092.46
SDLP	Seamus Shields*	9.04%	741	761.02	764.63	765.89	772.89	838.67	843.67	994.57
DUP	Drew Baxter*	6.62%	543	543	543	543	545	548	960	962.09
Sinn Féin	Barney McAleer*	4.66%	382	525.52	629.07	713.76	714.03	724.53	726.05	874.16
Ind. Nationalist	Brian McGrath*	6.76%	554	561.54	568.19	575.21	578.3	599.82	605.82	
DUP	Jim Patterson	3.46%	284	284.26	284.26	284.26	284.26	285.26		
UUP	John Anderson	2.12%	174	174.52	174.52	174.52	191.52	197.52		
Democratic Left	Patrick McClean	1.80%	148	150.86	151.81	152.08	158.08			
Alliance	Paul Gallagher	0.70%	57	57.26	57.26	57.62				
Electorate: 10,661 Valid: 8,200 (76.92%) Spoilt: 187 Quota: 1,026 Turnout: 8,387 (78.67%)

=== Omagh Town ===
1993: 2 x SDLP, 1 x DUP, 1 x Sinn Féin, 1 x UUP, 1 x Alliance, 1 x Labour Coalition
1997: 2 x SDLP, 1 x DUP, 1 x Sinn Féin, 1 x UUP, 1 x Alliance, 1 x Independent Labour
1993-1997 Change: Independent Labour joins Labour Coalition

Omagh Town - 7 seats
Party	Candidate	FPv%	Count									
Party	Candidate	FPv%	1	2	3	4	5	6	7	8	9	10
Sinn Féin	Francis Mackey*	16.85%	1,096									
SDLP	Patrick McGowan*	16.60%	1,080									
DUP	Oliver Gibson*	11.48%	747	747	747	889						
SDLP	Vincent Campbell	5.56%	362	365.64	450.64	450.64	450.64	729.92	846.38			
Labour Coalition	Johnny McLaughlin*	8.76%	570	583	606	611.25	611.25	676.3	805.92	825.6		
UUP	Reuben McKelvey	8.72%	567	567	567.75	577.75	584.35	584.35	585.87	585.87	806.22	806.46
Alliance	Ann Gormley*	7.24%	471	474.64	498.14	499.14	500.24	545.24	584.11	595.87	606.12	616.44
UUP	William Oldcroft	7.47%	486	486	486	498	506.25	507.25	508.25	508.97	609.82	610.3
DUP	Harry Cairns	5.76%	375	375	375.25	434.25	492.55	492.8	493.8	493.8		
Sinn Féin	Patrick O'Hagan	3.14%	204	456.46	464.71	464.96	464.96	492.06				
SDLP	Stephen McKenna	4.75%	309	315.24	436.74	437.74	437.74					
DUP	Keith Mosgrove	3.01%	196	196	196							
Ulster Independence	Sandra Jones	0.65%	42	42	42.5							
Electorate: 11,051 Valid: 6,505 (58.86%) Spoilt: 180 Quota: 814 Turnout: 6,685 (60.49%)

=== West Tyrone ===
1993: 2 x UUP, 2 x SDLP, 2 x Sinn Féin, 1 x DUP
1997: 2 x UUP, 2 x SDLP, 2 x Sinn Féin, 1 x DUP
1993-1997 Change: No change

West Tyrone - 7 seats
Party	Candidate	FPv%	Count								
Party	Candidate	FPv%	1	2	3	4	5	6	7	8	9
UUP	Arthur McFarland*	16.27%	1,243								
Sinn Féin	Kevin McGrade	14.46%	1,105								
UUP	Allan Rainey*	9.52%	727	963.67							
DUP	Thomas Buchanan*	10.73%	820	843	843	843	849	891.84	1,144.84		
SDLP	Liam McQuaid*	10.51%	803	804.15	811.56	825.56	849.47	888.7	892.62	904.62	989.62
Sinn Féin	Cathal Quinn	9.86%	753	753.46	875.27	883.27	899.66	913.66	913.66	914.66	978.66
SDLP	Patrick McDonnell	8.57%	655	656.15	660.31	671.44	684.7	701.16	702.85	703.85	828.11
SDLP	James Connolly	5.58%	426	426	428.08	429.08	460.08	510.83	513.42	519.42	555.01
Workers' Party	Tommy Owens	5.07%	387	387.23	389.18	417.18	433.31	448.54	452	459	
DUP	Walter McFarland	3.85%	294	309.87	310	310	314.23	324.46			
Alliance	George Kerr	2.83%	216	219.68	220.07	221.2	231.43				
Labour Coalition	Amanda McLaughlin	1.85%	141	141.46	143.41	148.41					
Workers' Party	Tony Winters	0.92%	70	70	70.26						
Electorate: 10,521 Valid: 7,640 (72.62%) Spoilt: 208 Quota: 956 Turnout: 7,848 (74.59%)
