= 1989 Omagh District Council election =

Local govt election in Northern Ireland

← 1985	17 May 1989	1993 →

All 21 seats to Omagh District Council 11 seats needed for a majority
	First party	Second party	Third party
Party	SDLP	Sinn Féin	UUP
Seats won	6	6	5
Seat change	▲1	0	▲1
	Fourth party	Fifth party	Sixth party
Party	DUP	Ind. Nationalist	Independent Labour
Seats won	3	1	0
Seat change	▼1	▲1	▼1
	Seventh party
Party	Irish Independence
Seats won	0
Seat change	▼1

Elections to Omagh District Council were held on 17 May 1989 on the same day as the other Northern Irish local government elections. The election used three district electoral areas to elect a total of 21 councillors.

== Election results ==
Omagh District Council Election Result 1989
Party	Seats	Gains	Losses	Net gain/loss	Seats %	Votes %	Votes	+/−
SDLP	6	1	0	▲1	28.6	26.1	5,587	▲8.5
Sinn Féin	6	0	0	Steady	28.6	24.9	5,331	▼6.7
UUP	5	1	0	▲1	23.8	21.9	4,679	▲5.1
DUP	3	0	1	▼1	14.3	15.1	3,217	▼3.8
Ind. Nationalist	1	1	0	▲1	4.8	4.1	872	▲4.1
Workers' Party	0	0	0	Steady	0.0	4.2	895	▲1.5
Alliance	0	0	0	Steady	0.0	3.7	800	▼1.0

Note: "Votes" are the first preference votes.

== Districts summary ==
Results of the Omagh District Council election, 1989 by district
Ward	%	Cllrs	%	Cllrs	%	Cllrs	%	Cllrs	%	Cllrs	Total Cllrs
Ward	SDLP		Sinn Féin		UUP		DUP		Others		Total Cllrs
Mid Tyrone	17.4	1	34.8	3	20.7	2	10.5	0	16.6	1	7
Omagh Town	36.6	3	13.8	1	15.5	1	21.7	2	12.4	1	7
West Tyrone	26.6	2	23.9	2	28.2	2	14.3	1	7.0	0	7
Total	26.1	6	24.9	6	21.9	5	15.1	3	12.0	1	21

== District results ==
=== Mid Tyrone ===
1985: 3 x Sinn Féin, 1 x UUP, 1 x SDLP, 1 x DUP, 1 x IIP
1989: 3 x Sinn Féin, 2 x UUP, 1 x SDLP, 1 x Independent Nationalist
1985-1989 Change: UUP gain from DUP, Independent Nationalist leaves IIP

Mid Tyrone - 7 seats
Party	Candidate	FPv%	Count							
Party	Candidate	FPv%	1	2	3	4	5	6	7	8
Sinn Féin	Patrick McMahon	15.41%	1,186							
Sinn Féin	Barney McAleer*	10.24%	788	962.04						
UUP	Desmond Anderson	11.78%	906	906	923	933	975			
SDLP	Seamus Shields	9.55%	735	750.58	769.96	859.53	859.53	1,320.53		
Ind. Nationalist	Brian McGrath*	11.33%	872	877.89	892.89	939.89	940.89	1,017.89		
Sinn Féin	Sean Clarke	9.10%	700	715.01	715.01	727.58	728.58	748.77	817.77	830.77
UUP	William Thompson*	8.90%	685	685	727	739	752	765.57	773.57	774.57
DUP	Willis Cooke*	6.32%	486	486	489	489	750	751	756	756
SDLP	Nuala McSherry	7.81%	601	603.47	635.47	679.47	681.66			
DUP	Tommy Armstrong	4.21%	324	324.19	325.19	325.19				
Workers' Party	Patrick McClean	3.17%	244	246.47	269.47					
Alliance	Ethne McClelland	2.17%	167	167.38						
Electorate: 10,300 Valid: 7,694 (74.70%) Spoilt: 273 Quota: 962 Turnout: 7,967 (77.35%)

=== Omagh Town ===
1985: 2 x SDLP, 2 x DUP, 1 x UUP, 1 x Sinn Féin, 1 x Independent Labour
1989: 3 x SDLP, 2 x DUP, 1 x UUP, 1 x Sinn Féin
1985-1989 Change: Independent Labour joins SDLP

Omagh Town - 7 seats
Party	Candidate	FPv%	Count									
Party	Candidate	FPv%	1	2	3	4	5	6	7	8	9	10
DUP	Oliver Gibson*	17.39%	1,058									
SDLP	Johnny McLaughlin*	13.48%	820									
UUP	Wilfred Breen*	12.10%	736	792.84								
SDLP	Patrick McGowan*	12.39%	754	754.84	771.57							
Sinn Féin	Francis Mackey*	11.44%	696	696.28	702.3	702.3	702.3	823.3				
SDLP	Stephen McKenna*	5.42%	330	330	348.48	348.64	354.71	358.99	358.99	372.99	613.23	771.23
DUP	Stanley Johnston	4.28%	260	464.4	464.47	481.27	481.43	481.43	679.13	679.13	690.25	700.09
Alliance	Patrick Bogan	5.01%	305	305.56	306.47	306.95	398.25	398.32	418.76	419.76	447.04	519.86
Workers' Party	James Doody	5.51%	335	336.12	341.23	341.23	344.65	348.72	358.16	369.16	394.79	
SDLP	Arthur Breen	5.34%	325	325.84	329.48	329.8	332.8	334.94	340.5	341.5		
UUP	Rachel Hussey	3.42%	208	234.32	234.6	247.4	252.4	252.4				
Sinn Féin	Colm Grimes	2.35%	143	143	144.05	144.05	144.05					
Alliance	Eric Bullick	1.89%	115	116.12	116.54	117.02						
Electorate: 9,451 Valid: 6,085 (64.38%) Spoilt: 179 Quota: 761 Turnout: 6,264 (66.28%)

=== West Tyrone ===
1985: 2 x UUP, 2 x SDLP, 2 x Sinn Féin, 1 x DUP
1989: 2 x UUP, 2 x SDLP, 2 x Sinn Féin, 1 x DUP
1985-1989 Change: No change

West Tyrone - 7 seats
Party	Candidate	FPv%	Count									
Party	Candidate	FPv%	1	2	3	4	5	6	7	8	9	10
UUP	Arthur McFarland*	17.28%	1,314									
SDLP	Liam McQuaid*	14.63%	1,112									
UUP	Allan Rainey	10.92%	830	1,135.1								
DUP	Harry Cairns*	10.94%	832	856.03	961.6							
Sinn Féin	Gerry McMenamin*	11.02%	838	838.27	838.27	841.42	841.42	841.42	923.42	927.57	927.74	979.19
Sinn Féin	Cecilia Quinn*	10.02%	762	762.27	762.44	777.74	777.74	778.01	860.31	865.76	866.76	890.08
SDLP	Gregory McMullan*	5.54%	421	421.27	421.61	512.51	512.51	512.51	517.66	560.11	567.32	748.7
SDLP	James Connolly	6.43%	489	489	489.17	520.07	520.08	521.25	540.4	574.64	587.63	636.42
Workers' Party	Tommy Owens	4.16%	316	316.81	317.83	328.33	328.33	329.03	333.03	398.72	417.27	
DUP	Raymond Farrell	1.79%	136	145.18	173.4	173.55	177.63	313.27	314.27	332.98		
Alliance	Ann Gormley	2.80%	213	215.97	225.32	228.17	228.22	231.49	235.64			
Sinn Féin	William McLaughlin	2.87%	218	218	218	218.9	218.9	218.9				
DUP	Raymond Little	1.59%	121	129.91	165.61	165.61	167.22					
Electorate: 9,836 Valid: 7,602 (77.29%) Spoilt: 243 Quota: 951 Turnout: 7,845 (79.76%)
