= 2018 West Tyrone by-election =

2018 UK Parliamentary by-election

- 3 May 2018

West Tyrone constituency
- Turnout: 55.1%
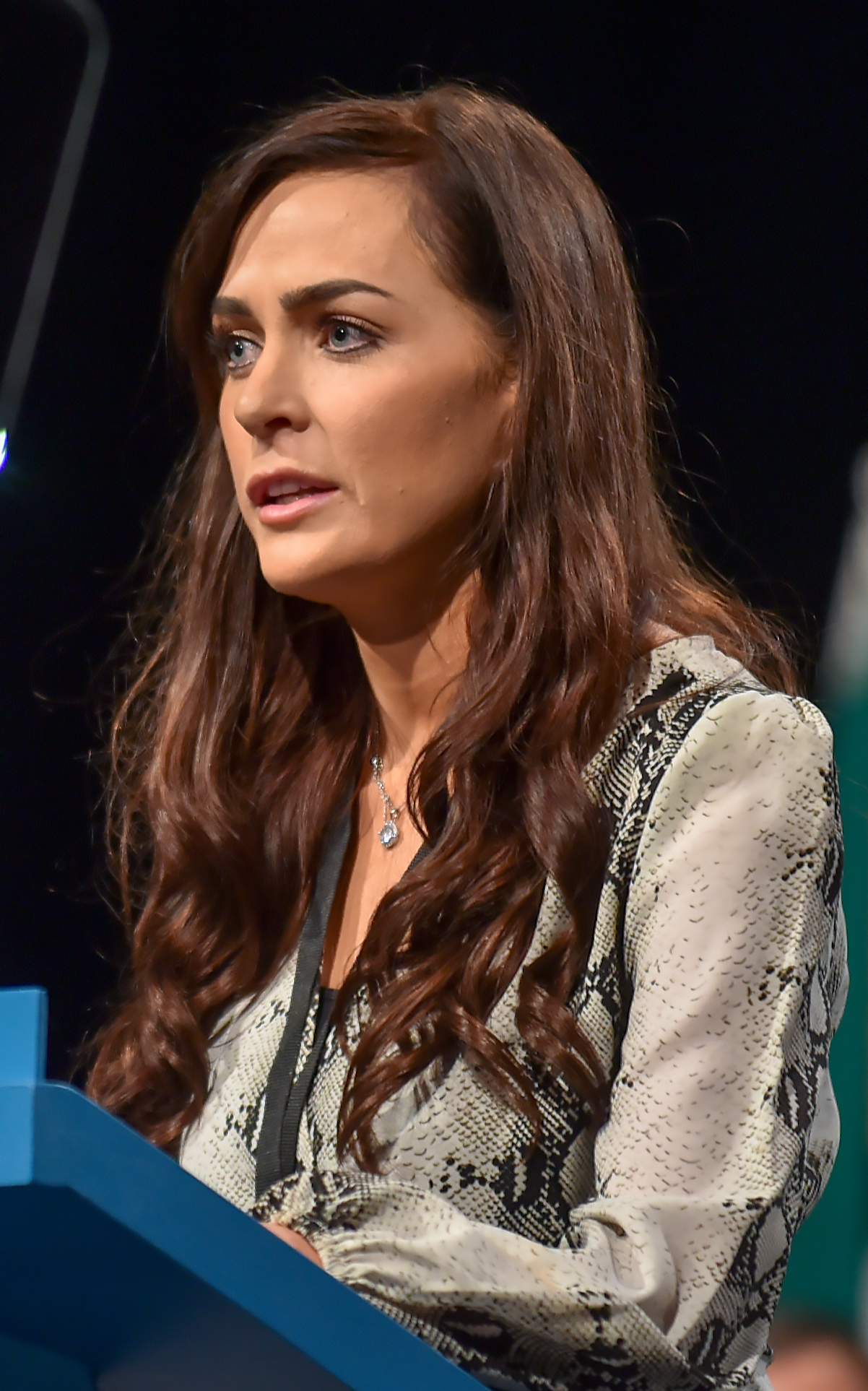

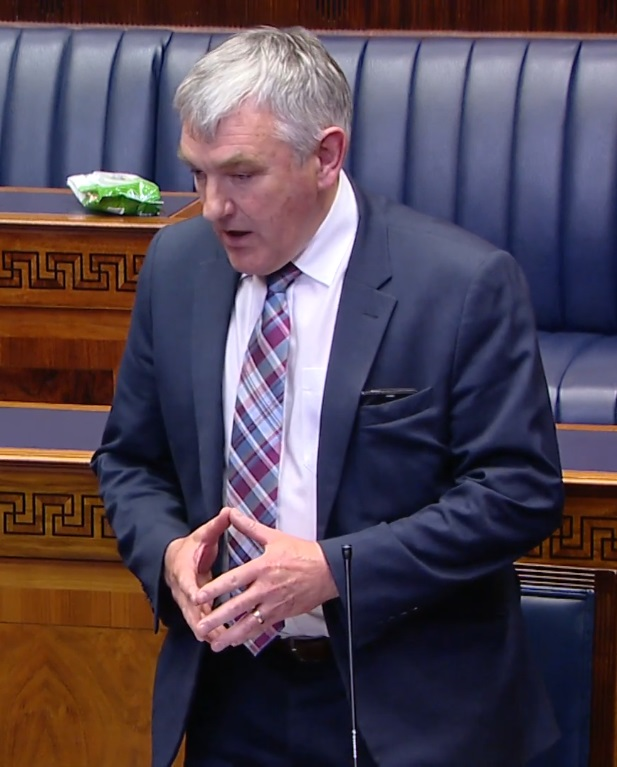

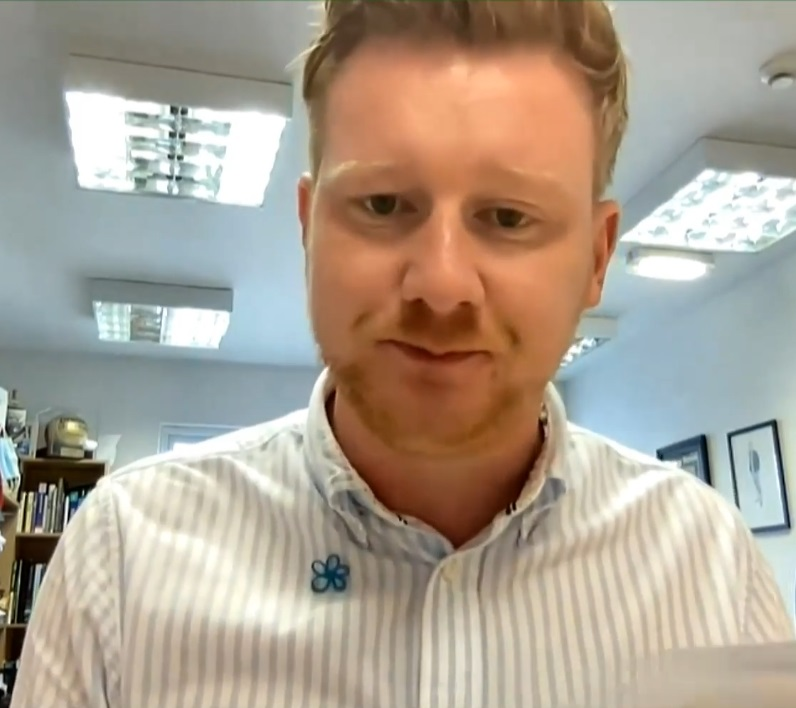
	First party	Second party
Candidate	Órfhlaith Begley	Thomas Buchanan
Party	Sinn Féin	DUP
Popular vote	16,346	8,390
Percentage	46.7%	24.0%
Swing	▼4.0 pp	▼3.0 pp
	Third party	Fourth party
		UUP
Candidate	Daniel McCrossan	Chris Smyth
Party	SDLP	UUP
Popular vote	6,254	2,909
Percentage	17.9%	8.3%
Swing	▲4.9 pp	▲3.1 pp
MP before election
Barry McElduff
Sinn Féin (susp.)
Elected MP
Órfhlaith Begley
Sinn Féin

A by-election for the United Kingdom parliamentary constituency of West Tyrone was held on 3 May 2018, following the resignation of incumbent Sinn Féin (Note: McElduff was suspended from Sinn Féin on 8 January 2018; he was an independent for the last week of his term before he resigned on 15 January.) MP Barry McElduff who became embroiled in a controversy over a video he posted on Twitter making a joke about the Kingsmill massacre on its anniversary. The by-election was won by Sinn Féin candidate Órfhlaith Begley, who held the seat with a slightly reduced majority.

This was the first of five by-elections held during the 2017–2019 parliament.

== Background ==
On 5 January 2018, sitting MP Barry McElduff tweeted a video of himself in a shop with a loaf of Kingsmill bread on his head, asking where the shop kept its bread. As it coincided with the 42nd anniversary of the Kingsmill massacre—where republicans murdered ten Protestant civilians—unionists accused him of mocking the massacre and the video was widely criticised, including by nationalists. Democratic Unionist Party (DUP) leader Arlene Foster said "mocking is depraved" and called the video "inhuman". McElduff deleted it and apologised, saying he was not alluding to the massacre and offering to meet the victims' families. On 8 January, Sinn Féin apologised for McElduff's actions, condemned the video, and suspended him from Sinn Féin for three months. McElduff announced on 15 January that he was resigning his seat. He was appointed the Steward and Bailiff of the Three Hundreds of Chiltern on 16 January 2018, a mechanism by which an MP's resignation is formalised.

The constituency of West Tyrone was created for the 1997 election and has been held by Sinn Féin since 2001. The seat is overwhelmingly nationalist, with nationalist parties consistently winning over 50% of the vote since the seat was created. Despite this, the nationalist vote has traditionally been split between the Social Democratic and Labour Party (SDLP) and Sinn Féin, whilst the unionist parties have been more willing to make pacts to increase their chances of victory.

Ordinarily, the writ of election for a vacant seat is moved by the party of the outgoing MP, but as Sinn Féin do not take their seats in the House of Commons they were unable to do so. In their absence, the writ was instead moved by the Government Chief Whip, Julian Smith. On 28 March, the writ of election was passed by the House of Commons. The election was scheduled for 3 May, coinciding with the scheduled local elections in England.

=== Unity candidate ===
After the election was called, these was discussion about the possibility of a non-partisan victims' candidate standing against Sinn Féin. As Sinn Féin won a majority of the vote at the last election, a unity candidate would be unlikely to win without support across both the nationalist and unionist communities. Potential candidates included Kevin Skelton and Sharon Gault, both of whom lost relatives in terrorist attacks during the Troubles. Ulster Unionist Party leader Robin Swann endorsed the proposal, calling for a "non-partisan candidate who will be a voice for victims to contest this seat against Sinn Féin".

Local Democratic Unionist Party MLA Tom Buchanan suggested that a cross-community candidate was unlikely, given that his party had not been approached about standing down. Further criticism of the idea was levelled by Alan McBride – a relative of two Shankill Road bombing victims – describing the idea of an agreed victims' candidate as "potentially toxic".

By late March the chances of a unity candidate being nominated were described as 'remote'. Kevin Skelton – who had earlier expressed his willingness to stand as a unity candidate – noted that he had not been approached by any party to stand. The Ulster Unionists, who had originally called for a non-partisan candidate, were understood to have unsuccessfully approached a different person to ask them to be a 'victims candidate'. Omagh bomb campaigner Michael Gallagher also voiced his disappointment, and acknowledged that there had not been a positive response to the idea. Ultimately, no unity candidate was nominated and each of Northern Ireland's major parties fielded a candidate instead.

== Candidates and result ==
Bar chart of the election result.

Nominations to stand in the by-election closed on 10 April 2018.

2018 West Tyrone by-election
Party	Candidate	Votes	%	±%
Sinn Féin	Órfhlaith Begley	16,346	46.7	–4.0
DUP	Thomas Buchanan	8,390	23.9	–3.0
SDLP	Daniel McCrossan	6,254	17.9	+4.9
UUP	Chris Smyth	2,909	8.3	+3.1
Alliance	Stephen Donnelly	1,130	3.2	+0.9
Majority		7,956	22.8	–1.0
Turnout		35,337	55.1	–13.1
Registered electors		64,101		
Sinn Féin hold		Swing	–0.5	

26-year-old local solicitor Órfhlaith Begley was selected as the Sinn Féin candidate at a party convention on 25 February. She is the daughter of Seán Begley, a long-serving Sinn Féin councillor on Omagh District Council.

The DUP announced local MLA Thomas Buchanan was announced as the party's candidate on 9 April. He had previously contested the seat in the 2017 general election.

The SDLP were understood to be preparing to contest the by-election. Former candidate and local MLA Daniel McCrossan released a statement in March condemning the fact that two months had passed from McElduff's resignation without a by-election date being fixed. McCrossan stated in early April that the selection process for the by-election was underway. He was announced as the SDLP candidate on 9 April.

Ulster Unionist Party leader Robin Swann repeatedly expressed a preference for a unity candidate instead of a candidate from his own party. Despite this, it was acknowledged that the party would have to explore "other options" in the event that such a candidate was not agreed upon. They nominated Omagh councillor Chris Smyth as their candidate. He accepted the nomination with "mixed emotions", expressing disappointment at the lack of a non-partisan and cross-community candidate.

The Alliance Party declined to support a 'victims candidate', with party leader Naomi Long giving her reasons to victims campaigner Kevin Skelton in a letter. Stephen Donnelly was subsequently announced as the Alliance candidate at the party conference on 24 March.

Cannabis legalisation campaigner Barry Brown had initially announced his intention to contest the by-election as the Citizens Independent Social Thought Alliance (CISTA) candidate, having previously stood in the 2015 and 2017 elections. He later decided not to stand, citing commitments by the SDLP and Alliance Party towards legalising medicinal cannabis.

== Campaign ==
Early in the campaign Sinn Féin candidate Órfhlaith Begley raised concerns at the proposed changes to the Parliamentary and Assembly constituencies that formed part of the sixth periodic boundary review. In particular, she expressed her opposition to the proposed division of the town of Dungiven, which was to be split between the constituencies of West Tyrone, Mid Ulster and a newly created Causeway constituency. She argued that the new boundaries "blatantly advantages the DUP at the expense of the nationalist electorate." Sinn Féin furthermore claimed that a campaign of voter suppression had been taking place, and urged local residents to confirm their eligibility to vote.

In mid-April an SDLP party worker claimed to have been verbally abused and attacked whilst putting up election posters in the constituency. According to the police report, the three men who assaulted the SDLP worker yelled sectarian abuse and threw his poster and ladder into the River Strule. Sinn Féin also claimed to have had posters stolen and destroyed in Omagh town centre. SDLP candidate Daniel McCrossan described the incidents as "an attack on democracy".

== Previous result ==
Outgoing MP Barry McElduff was elected at the General Election in 2017, following the retirement of fellow Sinn Féin politician Pat Doherty. Sinn Féin won an absolute majority of the vote, their best ever result in the constituency. McElduff had previously served as an MLA for the equivalent constituency in the Northern Ireland Assembly since 1998.

General election 2017: West Tyrone
Party	Candidate	Votes	%	±%
Sinn Féin	Barry McElduff	22,060	50.7	+7.2
DUP	Thomas Buchanan	11,718	26.9	+9.4
SDLP	Daniel McCrossan	5,635	13.0	–3.7
UUP	Alicia Clarke	2,253	5.2	–10.7
Alliance	Stephen Donnelly	1,000	2.3	+0.1
Green (NI)	Ciaran McClean	427	1.0	–1.0
CISTA	Barry Brown	393	0.9	–0.5
Majority		10,342	23.8	–2.2
Turnout		43,675	68.2	+7.7
Registered electors		64,009		
Sinn Féin hold		Swing	–1.1	
