= 2011 Omagh District Council election =

Local govt election in Northern Ireland

- 5 May 2011

All 21 seats to Omagh District Council 11 seats needed for a majority
	First party	Second party	Third party
Party	Sinn Féin	DUP	UUP
Seats won	10	3	3
Seat change	0	0	0
	Fourth party	Fifth party
Party	SDLP	Independent
Seats won	3	2
Seat change	0	0
- Party with the most votes by district.

Elections to Omagh District Council were held on 5 May 2011, on the same day as the other Northern Irish local government elections. The election used three district electoral areas to elect a total of 21 councillors.

There was no change from the prior election.

== Election results ==
Omagh District Council Election Result 2011
Party	Seats	Gains	Losses	Net gain/loss	Seats %	Votes %	Votes	+/−
Sinn Féin	10	0	0	0	47.6	46.9	10,353	▲2.3
DUP	3	0	0	0	14.3	16.4	3,624	▼0.3
UUP	3	0	0	0	14.3	14.3	3,162	▲1.3
SDLP	3	0	0	0	14.3	13.3	2,943	▼6.0
Independent	2	0	0	0	9.5	7.6	1,671	▲1.3
Alliance	0	0	0	0	0.0	1.5	324	▲1.5

Note: "Votes" are the first preference votes.

== Districts summary ==
Results of the Omagh District Council election, 2011 by district
Ward	%	Cllrs	%	Cllrs	%	Cllrs	%	Cllrs	%	Cllrs	Total Cllrs
Ward	Sinn Féin		DUP		UUP		SDLP		Others		Total Cllrs
Mid Tyrone	56.5	4	9.9	1	14.3	1	11.3	1	8.0	0	7
Omagh Town	32.0	2	17.6	1	15.3	1	13.0	1	22.1	2	7
West Tyrone	48.6	4	22.2	1	13.6	1	15.6	1	0.0	0	7
Total	46.9	10	16.4	3	14.3	3	13.3	3	9.1	2	21

== District results ==
=== Mid Tyrone ===
2005: 4 x Sinn Féin, 1 x UUP, 1 x SDLP, 1 x DUP
2011: 4 x Sinn Féin, 1 x UUP, 1 x SDLP, 1 x DUP
2005-2011 Change: No change

Mid Tyrone - 7 seats
Party	Candidate	FPv%	Count						
Party	Candidate	FPv%	1	2	3	4	5	6	7
Sinn Féin	Sean Clarke*	15.02%	1,211						
UUP	Bert Wilson*	14.29%	1,152						
Sinn Féin	Declan McAleer*	14.06%	1,134						
Sinn Féin	Anne Marie Fitzgerald	11.47%	925	943.54	951.9	951.9	978.52	1,113.52	
SDLP	Seamus Shields*	11.29%	910	918.46	987.9	996.48	1,007.48	1,100.48	
Sinn Féin	Sean Donnelly	9.36%	755	813.86	822.94	823.07	851.78	918.85	966.85
DUP	Charles Chittick*	9.87%	796	796.36	812.36	936.64	936.86	943.49	943.49
Sinn Féin	Sharon O'Brien*	6.54%	527	635.18	641.36	641.36	689.21	743.68	773.68
Independent	Paul Grogan	5.89%	475	478.6	523.6	524.9	527.98		
Independent	Ciaran McClean	2.21%	178	182.32					
Electorate: 12,395 Valid: 8,063 (65.05%) Spoilt: 170 Quota: 1,008 Turnout: 8,233 (66.42%)

=== Omagh Town ===
2005: 2 x Sinn Féin, 2 x Independent, 1 x DUP, 1 x UUP, 1 x SDLP
2011: 2 x Sinn Féin, 2 x Independent, 1 x DUP, 1 x UUP, 1 x SDLP
2005-2011 Change: No change

Omagh Town - 7 seats
Party	Candidate	FPv%	Count								
Party	Candidate	FPv%	1	2	3	4	5	6	7	8	9
DUP	Errol Thompson	17.56%	1,064								
UUP	Ross Hussey*	15.29%	926								
Sinn Féin	Sean Begley*	13.04%	790								
SDLP	Josephine Deehan*	9.62%	583	613.36	628.54	638.76	761.76				
Independent	Patrick McGowan*	8.85%	536	626.62	689.87	703.16	731.39	859.39			
Independent	Johnny McLaughlin*	7.96%	482	544.56	569.63	576.32	587.93	725.24	801.24		
Sinn Féin	Sorcha McAnespy	9.33%	565	565	565.46	567.46	586.46	612.45	614.45	625.45	648.97
Sinn Féin	Martin McColgan*	9.62%	583	583	583	583	587	591.46	591.46	596.46	601.98
Alliance	Eric Bullick	4.03%	244	321.74	365.21	449.8	462.63				
SDLP	Steven Brown	3.38%	205	210.52	212.82	214.28					
Alliance	Victoria Geelan	1.32%	80	116.8	131.75						
Electorate: 10,851 Valid: 6,058 (55.83%) Spoilt: 126 Quota: 758 Turnout: 6,184 (56.99%)

=== West Tyrone ===
2005: 4 x Sinn Féin, 1 x DUP, 1 x SDLP, 1 x UUP
2011: 4 x Sinn Féin, 1 x DUP, 1 x SDLP, 1 x UUP
2005-2011 Change: No change

West Tyrone - 7 seats
Party	Candidate	FPv%	Count				
Party	Candidate	FPv%	1	2	3	4	5
Sinn Féin	Glenn Campbell	17.28%	1,375				
DUP	Thomas Buchanan*	15.90%	1,265				
SDLP	Patrick McDonnell*	15.65%	1,245				
Sinn Féin	Cecilia Quinn*	12.88%	1,025				
Sinn Féin	Frankie Donnelly*	9.01%	717	1,017.44			
UUP	Allan Rainey*	10.60%	843	845.8	888.48	1,100.48	
Sinn Féin	Peter Kelly*	9.38%	746	808.44	808.66	815.78	1,055.17
DUP	Elaine Thompson	6.27%	499	499.28	703.66	736.16	745.78
UUP	Jane Clarke	3.03%	241	243.8	265.58		
Electorate: 11,926 Valid: 7,956 (66.71%) Spoilt: 174 Quota: 995 Turnout: 8,130 (68.17%)
