= Omagh (District Electoral Area) =

District electoral area in Northern Ireland

- Fermanagh and Omagh District Council DEA constituency

Current constituency
- Created: 1985
- Seats: 7 (1985-2014); 6 (2014-)
- Councillors: Josephine Deehan (IND); Stephen Donnelly (APNI); Catherine Kelly (SF); Marty McColgan (SF); Barry McElduff (SF); Errol Thompson (DUP)

Omagh DEA within Fermanagh and Omagh

Omagh Town DEA (1993-2014) within Omagh

Omagh is one of the seven district electoral areas (DEA) in Fermanagh and Omagh, Northern Ireland. The district elects six members to Fermanagh and Omagh District Council and contains the wards of Camowen, Coolnagard, Dergmoney, Gortrush, Killyclogher and Strule. Omagh forms part of the West Tyrone constituencies for the Northern Ireland Assembly and UK Parliament.

It was created for the 1985 local elections, replacing Omagh Area C which had existed since 1973. It was called Omagh Town until 2014, and originally contained seven wards (Camowen, Coolnagard, Dergmoney, Drumragh, Gortrush, Lisanelly and Strule). For the 2014 local elections it was reduced to six wards.

== Councillors ==
| Election | Councillor (Party) | Councillor (Party) | Councillor (Party) | Councillor (Party) | Councillor (Party) | Councillor (Party) | Councillor (Party) |
|---|---|---|---|---|---|---|---|
| 2023 | Marty McColgan (Sinn Féin) | Barry McElduff (Sinn Féin) | Josephine Deehan (Independent)/ (SDLP) | Stephen Donnelly (Alliance) | Catherine Kelly (Sinn Féin) | Errol Thompson (DUP) | 6 seats 2014–present |
| August 2021 Co-Option | Ann-Marie Fitzgerald (Sinn Féin) | Barry McElduff (Sinn Féin) | Josephine Deehan (Independent)/ (SDLP) | Stephen Donnelly (Alliance) | Matthew Bell (UUP) | Errol Thompson (DUP) | 6 seats 2014–present |
| 2019 | Ann-Marie Fitzgerald (Sinn Féin) | Barry McElduff (Sinn Féin) | Josephine Deehan (Independent)/ (SDLP) | Stephen Donnelly (Alliance) | Chris Smyth (UUP) | Errol Thompson (DUP) | 6 seats 2014–present |
| March/April 2016 Defections | Marty McColgan (Sinn Féin) | Sorcha McAnespy (Independent)/ (Sinn Féin) | Josephine Deehan (Independent)/ (SDLP) | Joanne Donnelly (Independent)/ (SDLP) | Chris Smyth (UUP) | Errol Thompson (DUP) | 6 seats 2014–present |
| 2014 | Marty McColgan (Sinn Féin) | Sorcha McAnespy (Independent)/ (Sinn Féin) | Josephine Deehan (Independent)/ (SDLP) | Joanne Donnelly (Independent)/ (SDLP) | Chris Smyth (UUP) | Errol Thompson (DUP) | 6 seats 2014–present |
| 2011 | Sean Begley (Sinn Féin) | Sorcha McAnespy (Independent)/ (Sinn Féin) | Josephine Deehan (Independent)/ (SDLP) | Patrick McGowan (Independent)/ (SDLP) | Ross Hussey (UUP) | Errol Thompson (DUP) | Johnny McLaughlin (Independent)/ (Labour Coalition)/ (SDLP) |
| 2005 | Sean Begley (Sinn Féin) | Marty McColgan (Sinn Féin) | Josephine Deehan (Independent)/ (SDLP) | Patrick McGowan (Independent)/ (SDLP) | Ross Hussey (UUP) | Clive McFarland (DUP) | Johnny McLaughlin (Independent)/ (Labour Coalition)/ (SDLP) |
| 2001 | Sean Begley (Sinn Féin) | Joe Byrne (SDLP) | Josephine Deehan (Independent)/ (SDLP) | Patrick McGowan (Independent)/ (SDLP) | Reuben McKelvey (UUP) | Oliver Gibson (DUP) | Johnny McLaughlin (Independent)/ (Labour Coalition)/ (SDLP) |
| 1997 | Francis Mackey (Sinn Féin) | Vincent Campbell (SDLP) | Ann Gormley (Alliance) | Patrick McGowan (Independent)/ (SDLP) | Reuben McKelvey (UUP) | Oliver Gibson (DUP) | Johnny McLaughlin (Independent)/ (Labour Coalition)/ (SDLP) |
| 1993 | Francis Mackey (Sinn Féin) | Joe Byrne (SDLP) | Ann Gormley (Alliance) | Patrick McGowan (Independent)/ (SDLP) | Wilfred Breen (UUP) | Oliver Gibson (DUP) | Johnny McLaughlin (Independent)/ (Labour Coalition)/ (SDLP) |
| 1989 | Francis Mackey (Sinn Féin) | Stanley Johnston (DUP) | Stephen McKenna (SDLP) | Patrick McGowan (Independent)/ (SDLP) | Wilfred Breen (UUP) | Oliver Gibson (DUP) | Johnny McLaughlin (Independent)/ (Labour Coalition)/ (SDLP) |
| 1985 | Francis Mackey (Sinn Féin) | David Aiken (DUP) | Stephen McKenna (SDLP) | Bernadette Grant (SDLP) | Wilfred Breen (UUP) | Oliver Gibson (DUP) | Johnny McLaughlin (Independent)/ (Labour Coalition)/ (SDLP) |

== 2023 Election ==
2019: 2 x Sinn Féin, 1 x DUP, 1 x UUP, 1 x Alliance, 1 x Independent

2023: 3 x Sinn Féin, 1 x DUP, 1 x Alliance, 1 x Independent

2019–2023 Change: Sinn Féin gain from UUP

Omagh - 6 seats
| Party | Candidate | FPv% | Count | | | | | | |
| Party | Candidate | FPv% | 1 | 2 | 3 | 4 | 5 | 6 | 7 |
|---|---|---|---|---|---|---|---|---|---|
| Sinn Féin | Barry McElduff* | 20.22% | 1,342 | | | | | | |
| DUP | Errol Thompson* | 17.15% | 1,138 | | | | | | |
| Sinn Féin | Catherine Kelly | 15.27% | 1,013 | | | | | | |
| Sinn Féin | Marty McColgan | 11.65% | 773 | 1,073.44 | | | | | |
| Alliance | Stephen Donnelly* | 13.14% | 872 | 899.84 | 903.92 | 958.92 | | | |
| Independent | Josephine Deehan* | 7.07% | 469 | 492.20 | 494.58 | 545.49 | 582.01 | 601.81 | 940.60 |
| UUP | Matthew Bell* | 7.37% | 489 | 489.29 | 668.13 | 673.47 | 674.79 | 675.23 | 695.14 |
| SDLP | Brenda Mellon | 5.80% | 385 | 410.81 | 412.34 | 437.67 | 520.61 | 561.97 | |
| Independent | Kathy Dunphy | 1.21% | 80 | 85.22 | 85.90 | | | | |
| Socialist Party | Amy Ferguson | 1.13% | 75 | 76.74 | 77.08 | | | | |
Electorate: 13,279 Valid: 6,636 (49.97%) Spoilt: 103 Quota: 949 Turnout: 6,739 (50.75%)

== 2019 Election ==
2014: 2 x Sinn Féin, 2 x SDLP, 1 x DUP, 1 x UUP

2019: 2 x Sinn Féin, 1 x DUP, 1 x UUP, 1 x Alliance, 1 x Independent

2014-2019 Change: Alliance and Independent gain from SDLP (two seats)

Omagh - 6 seats
| Party | Candidate | FPv% | Count | | | | | | | | | | |
| Party | Candidate | FPv% | 1 | 2 | 3 | 4 | 5 | 6 | 7 | 8 | 9 | 10 | 11 |
|---|---|---|---|---|---|---|---|---|---|---|---|---|---|
| DUP | Errol Thompson* | 15.24% | 970 | | | | | | | | | | |
| Sinn Féin | Barry McElduff | 14.14% | 900 | 900 | 903 | 914 | | | | | | | |
| Independent | Josephine Deehan* | 11.44% | 728 | 728.96 | 738.02 | 752.02 | 762.62 | 800.68 | 840.74 | 916.74 | | | |
| Alliance | Stephen Donnelly | 9.68% | 616 | 616.24 | 620.24 | 638.24 | 641.48 | 665.48 | 697.48 | 708.48 | 735.48 | 807.48 | 935.48 |
| UUP | Chris Smyth* † | 9.95% | 633 | 676.44 | 677.56 | 678.62 | 775.02 | 776.08 | 787.26 | 791.32 | 797.32 | 803.32 | 839.44 |
| Sinn Féin | Ann-Marie Fitzgerald* | 9.26% | 589 | 589 | 589 | 594 | 595 | 607 | 611 | 629 | 639 | 670 | 791 |
| Sinn Féin | Marty McColgan* | 8.00% | 509 | 509 | 511 | 520 | 520 | 530 | 536 | 550 | 554 | 604 | 643 |
| SDLP | Lee Hawkes | 4.02% | 256 | 256.18 | 257.18 | 262.18 | 263.24 | 271.24 | 285.3 | 292.3 | 491.36 | 532.36 | |
| Independent | Sorcha McAnespy* | 3.05% | 194 | 194.06 | 198.06 | 212.06 | 212.12 | 234.12 | 257.12 | 292.12 | 309.12 | | |
| SDLP | Jacinta McKeown | 4.05% | 258 | 258.12 | 258.12 | 258.12 | 259.12 | 264.12 | 266.12 | 279.12 | | | |
| Aontú | Margaret Swift | 2.86% | 182 | 182 | 182 | 187 | 188.06 | 192.06 | 205.06 | | | | |
| Green (NI) | Susan Glass | 2.22% | 141 | 141.24 | 144.3 | 151.3 | 155.42 | 165.54 | | | | | |
| Independent | Joanne Donnelly* | 2.01% | 128 | 128.3 | 135.3 | 146.36 | 146.36 | | | | | | |
| TUV | Charles Chittick | 1.81% | 115 | 125.2 | 125.26 | 132.26 | | | | | | | |
| CISTA | Barry Brown | 1.59% | 101 | 101.24 | 109.24 | | | | | | | | |
| Independent | Will Convey | 0.68% | 43 | 43.3 | | | | | | | | | |
Electorate: 12,737 Valid: 6,363 (49.96%) Spoilt: 98 Quota: 910 Turnout: 6,461 (50.73%)

== 2014 Election ==
2011: 2 x Sinn Féin, 2 x Independent, 1 x SDLP, 1 x DUP, 1 x UUP

2014: 2 x Sinn Féin, 2 x SDLP, 1 x DUP, 1 x UUP

2011-2014 Change: SDLP gain from Independent, Independent loss due to the reduction of one seat

Omagh - 6 seats
| Party | Candidate | FPv% | Count | | | | | | |
| Party | Candidate | FPv% | 1 | 2 | 3 | 4 | 5 | 6 | 7 |
|---|---|---|---|---|---|---|---|---|---|
| SDLP | Josephine Deehan* ‡ | 15.04% | 946 | | | | | | |
| Sinn Féin | Sorcha McAnespy* ‡ | 14.82% | 932 | | | | | | |
| DUP | Errol Thompson* | 10.24% | 644 | 644 | 644.6 | 664.6 | 664.78 | 1,094.78 | |
| UUP | Chris Smyth* | 10.83% | 681 | 685 | 686.4 | 752.5 | 752.5 | 851.5 | |
| SDLP | Joanne Donnelly ‡ | 6.92% | 435 | 453 | 519.6 | 701.9 | 708.92 | 731.51 | 835.51 |
| Sinn Féin | Marty McColgan* | 11.80% | 742 | 758 | 764 | 776.8 | 819.01 | 819.01 | 819.01 |
| Sinn Féin | Catherine Kelly | 8.84% | 556 | 565 | 571.9 | 592.1 | 623.15 | 625.25 | 625.25 |
| DUP | Adele Crawford | 8.66% | 545 | 545 | 545.7 | 576 | 576.36 | | |
| Alliance | Eric Bullick | 5.98% | 376 | 396 | 403.6 | | | | |
| Independent | Gabrielle McAleer | 1.34% | 84 | | | | | | |
Electorate: 12,373 Valid: 5,941 (48.02%) Spoilt: 153 Quota: 849 Turnout: 6,094 (49.25%)

== 2011 Election ==
2005: 2 x Sinn Féin, 2 x Independent, 1 x DUP, 1 x UUP, 1 x SDLP

2011: 2 x Sinn Féin, 2 x Independent, 1 x DUP, 1 x UUP, 1 x SDLP

2005-2011 Change: No change

Omagh Town - 7 seats
| Party | Candidate | FPv% | Count | | | | | | | | |
| Party | Candidate | FPv% | 1 | 2 | 3 | 4 | 5 | 6 | 7 | 8 | 9 |
|---|---|---|---|---|---|---|---|---|---|---|---|
| DUP | Errol Thompson | 17.56% | 1,064 | | | | | | | | |
| UUP | Ross Hussey* | 15.29% | 926 | | | | | | | | |
| Sinn Féin | Sean Begley* | 13.04% | 790 | | | | | | | | |
| SDLP | Josephine Deehan* | 9.62% | 583 | 613.36 | 628.54 | 638.76 | 761.76 | | | | |
| Independent | Patrick McGowan* | 8.85% | 536 | 626.62 | 689.87 | 703.16 | 731.39 | 859.39 | | | |
| Independent | Johnny McLaughlin* | 7.96% | 482 | 544.56 | 569.63 | 576.32 | 587.93 | 725.24 | 801.24 | | |
| Sinn Féin | Sorcha McAnespy | 9.33% | 565 | 565 | 565.46 | 567.46 | 586.46 | 612.45 | 614.45 | 625.45 | 648.97 |
| Sinn Féin | Martin McColgan* | 9.62% | 583 | 583 | 583 | 583 | 587 | 591.46 | 591.46 | 596.46 | 601.98 |
| Alliance | Eric Bullick | 4.03% | 244 | 321.74 | 365.21 | 449.8 | 462.63 | | | | |
| SDLP | Steven Brown | 3.38% | 205 | 210.52 | 212.82 | 214.28 | | | | | |
| Alliance | Victoria Geelan | 1.32% | 80 | 116.8 | 131.75 | | | | | | |
Electorate: 10,851 Valid: 6,058 (55.83%) Spoilt: 126 Quota: 758 Turnout: 6,184 (56.99%)

== 2005 Election ==
2001: 2 x SDLP, 2 x Independent, 1 x Sinn Féin, 1 x DUP, 1 x UUP

2005: 2 x Sinn Féin, 2 x Independent, 1 x SDLP, 1 x DUP, 1 x UUP

2001-2005 Change: Sinn Féin gain from SDLP

Omagh Town - 7 seats
| Party | Candidate | FPv% | Count | | | |
| Party | Candidate | FPv% | 1 | 2 | 3 | 4 |
|---|---|---|---|---|---|---|
| DUP | Clive McFarland | 18.71% | 1,264 | | | |
| Sinn Féin | Sean Begley* | 17.07% | 1,153 | | | |
| Independent | Patrick McGowan* | 13.10% | 885 | | | |
| SDLP | Josephine Deehan* | 12.76% | 862 | | | |
| UUP | Ross Hussey | 12.30% | 831 | 1,213.68 | | |
| Independent | Johnny McLaughlin* | 9.49% | 641 | 671.96 | 858.08 | |
| Sinn Féin | Martin McColgan | 8.41% | 568 | 568.72 | 569.08 | 832.11 |
| SDLP | Joe Byrne* | 8.16% | 551 | 553.16 | 596.72 | 641.67 |
Electorate: 10,577 Valid: 6,755 (63.86%) Spoilt: 177 Quota: 845 Turnout: 6,932 (65.54%)

== 2001 Election ==
1997: 2 x SDLP, 1 x Sinn Féin, 1 x DUP, 1 x UUP, 1 x Alliance, 1 x Labour Coalition

2001: 2 x SDLP, 2 x Independent, 1 x Sinn Féin, 1 x DUP, 1 x UUP

1997-2001 Change: Independents (two seats) leave SDLP and Labour Coalition, SDLP gain from Alliance

Omagh Town - 7 seats
| Party | Candidate | FPv% | Count | | | | | | | |
| Party | Candidate | FPv% | 1 | 2 | 3 | 4 | 5 | 6 | 7 | 8 |
|---|---|---|---|---|---|---|---|---|---|---|
| Sinn Féin | Sean Begley | 14.08% | 1,123 | | | | | | | |
| DUP | Oliver Gibson* | 13.63% | 1,087 | | | | | | | |
| Independent | Patrick McGowan* | 13.47% | 1,074 | | | | | | | |
| SDLP | Joe Byrne* | 12.63% | 1,007 | | | | | | | |
| UUP | Reuben McKelvey* | 7.70% | 614 | 614 | 688 | 733.18 | 1,223.18 | | | |
| Independent | Johnny McLaughlin* | 9.52% | 759 | 764.17 | 813.39 | 817.44 | 875.04 | 1,021.74 | | |
| SDLP | Josephine Deehan | 7.89% | 629 | 632.19 | 758.84 | 759.29 | 767.64 | 844.14 | 898.64 | 921.39 |
| Sinn Féin | Paddy Gallagher | 9.57% | 763 | 867.61 | 886.16 | 886.25 | 886.34 | 887.24 | 906.54 | 906.89 |
| UUP | John Anderson | 6.92% | 552 | 552 | 611 | 645.65 | | | | |
| SDLP | Vincent Campbell* | 2.23% | 178 | 181.74 | | | | | | |
| DUP | Thomas McCordick | 2.14% | 171 | 171 | | | | | | |
| Independent | Kevin Taylor | 0.24% | 19 | 19.22 | | | | | | |
Electorate: 11,036 Valid: 7,976 (72.27%) Spoilt: 222 Quota: 998 Turnout: 8,198 (74.28%)

== 1997 Election ==
1993: 2 x SDLP, 1 x DUP, 1 x Sinn Féin, 1 x UUP, 1 x Alliance, 1 x Labour Coalition

1997: 2 x SDLP, 1 x DUP, 1 x Sinn Féin, 1 x UUP, 1 x Alliance, 1 x Independent Labour

1993-1997 Change: Independent Labour joins Labour Coalition

Omagh Town - 7 seats
| Party | Candidate | FPv% | Count | | | | | | | | | |
| Party | Candidate | FPv% | 1 | 2 | 3 | 4 | 5 | 6 | 7 | 8 | 9 | 10 |
|---|---|---|---|---|---|---|---|---|---|---|---|---|
| Sinn Féin | Francis Mackey* | 16.85% | 1,096 | | | | | | | | | |
| SDLP | Patrick McGowan* | 16.60% | 1,080 | | | | | | | | | |
| DUP | Oliver Gibson* | 11.48% | 747 | 747 | 747 | 889 | | | | | | |
| SDLP | Vincent Campbell | 5.56% | 362 | 365.64 | 450.64 | 450.64 | 450.64 | 729.92 | 846.38 | | | |
| Labour Coalition | Johnny McLaughlin* | 8.76% | 570 | 583 | 606 | 611.25 | 611.25 | 676.3 | 805.92 | 825.6 | | |
| UUP | Reuben McKelvey | 8.72% | 567 | 567 | 567.75 | 577.75 | 584.35 | 584.35 | 585.87 | 585.87 | 806.22 | 806.46 |
| Alliance | Ann Gormley* | 7.24% | 471 | 474.64 | 498.14 | 499.14 | 500.24 | 545.24 | 584.11 | 595.87 | 606.12 | 616.44 |
| UUP | William Oldcroft | 7.47% | 486 | 486 | 486 | 498 | 506.25 | 507.25 | 508.25 | 508.97 | 609.82 | 610.3 |
| DUP | Harry Cairns | 5.76% | 375 | 375 | 375.25 | 434.25 | 492.55 | 492.8 | 493.8 | 493.8 | | |
| Sinn Féin | Patrick O'Hagan | 3.14% | 204 | 456.46 | 464.71 | 464.96 | 464.96 | 492.06 | | | | |
| SDLP | Stephen McKenna | 4.75% | 309 | 315.24 | 436.74 | 437.74 | 437.74 | | | | | |
| DUP | Keith Mosgrove | 3.01% | 196 | 196 | 196 | | | | | | | |
| Ulster Independence | Sandra Jones | 0.65% | 42 | 42 | 42.5 | | | | | | | |
Electorate: 11,051 Valid: 6,505 (58.86%) Spoilt: 180 Quota: 814 Turnout: 6,685 (60.49%)

== 1993 Election ==
1989: 3 x SDLP, 2 x DUP, 1 x UUP, 1 x Sinn Féin

1993: 2 x SDLP, 1 x DUP, 1 x UUP, 1 x Sinn Féin, 1 x Alliance, 1 x Independent Labour

1989-1993 Change: Alliance gain from DUP, Independent Labour leaves SDLP

Omagh Town - 7 seats
| Party | Candidate | FPv% | Count | | | | | | | | |
| Party | Candidate | FPv% | 1 | 2 | 3 | 4 | 5 | 6 | 7 | 8 | 9 |
|---|---|---|---|---|---|---|---|---|---|---|---|
| DUP | Oliver Gibson* | 14.83% | 995 | | | | | | | | |
| SDLP | Patrick McGowan* | 14.01% | 940 | | | | | | | | |
| Independent Labour | Johnny McLaughlin* | 13.73% | 921 | | | | | | | | |
| UUP | Wilfred Breen* | 12.05% | 808 | 835.36 | 839.36 | | | | | | |
| Alliance | Ann Gormley | 7.50% | 503 | 504.12 | 516.12 | 528 | 547.03 | 771.1 | 837.92 | 878.92 | |
| Sinn Féin | Francis Mackey* | 12.03% | 807 | 807 | 811 | 815.62 | 835.53 | 837.64 | 838.75 | 863.75 | |
| SDLP | Joe Byrne | 6.41% | 430 | 430.32 | 435.32 | 461.72 | 470.74 | 477.83 | 480.27 | 751.07 | 768.07 |
| DUP | Ivan Burnside | 5.81% | 390 | 498.48 | 499.48 | 499.48 | 501.46 | 506.46 | 693.24 | 693.35 | 693.35 |
| SDLP | Stephen McKenna* | 4.68% | 314 | 314.32 | 327.32 | 378.58 | 401.46 | 404.28 | 407.6 | | |
| UUP | Reuben McKelvey | 4.04% | 271 | 286.52 | 289.52 | 290.4 | 293.26 | 321.23 | | | |
| Alliance | Ethne McClelland | 4.10% | 275 | 276.76 | 279.76 | 282.29 | 286.03 | | | | |
| Workers' Party | Hugh Mullin | 0.81% | 54 | 54 | | | | | | | |
Electorate: 10,799 Valid: 6,708 (62.12%) Spoilt: 179 Quota: 839 Turnout: 6,887 (63.77%)

== 1989 Election ==
1985: 2 x SDLP, 2 x DUP, 1 x UUP, 1 x Sinn Féin, 1 x Independent Labour

1989: 3 x SDLP, 2 x DUP, 1 x UUP, 1 x Sinn Féin

1985-1989 Change: Independent Labour joins SDLP

Omagh Town - 7 seats
| Party | Candidate | FPv% | Count | | | | | | | | | |
| Party | Candidate | FPv% | 1 | 2 | 3 | 4 | 5 | 6 | 7 | 8 | 9 | 10 |
|---|---|---|---|---|---|---|---|---|---|---|---|---|
| DUP | Oliver Gibson* | 17.39% | 1,058 | | | | | | | | | |
| SDLP | Johnny McLaughlin* | 13.48% | 820 | | | | | | | | | |
| UUP | Wilfred Breen* | 12.10% | 736 | 792.84 | | | | | | | | |
| SDLP | Patrick McGowan* | 12.39% | 754 | 754.84 | 771.57 | | | | | | | |
| Sinn Féin | Francis Mackey* | 11.44% | 696 | 696.28 | 702.3 | 702.3 | 702.3 | 823.3 | | | | |
| SDLP | Stephen McKenna* | 5.42% | 330 | 330 | 348.48 | 348.64 | 354.71 | 358.99 | 358.99 | 372.99 | 613.23 | 771.23 |
| DUP | Stanley Johnston | 4.28% | 260 | 464.4 | 464.47 | 481.27 | 481.43 | 481.43 | 679.13 | 679.13 | 690.25 | 700.09 |
| Alliance | Patrick Bogan | 5.01% | 305 | 305.56 | 306.47 | 306.95 | 398.25 | 398.32 | 418.76 | 419.76 | 447.04 | 519.86 |
| Workers' Party | James Doody | 5.51% | 335 | 336.12 | 341.23 | 341.23 | 344.65 | 348.72 | 358.16 | 369.16 | 394.79 | |
| SDLP | Arthur Breen | 5.34% | 325 | 325.84 | 329.48 | 329.8 | 332.8 | 334.94 | 340.5 | 341.5 | | |
| UUP | Rachel Hussey | 3.42% | 208 | 234.32 | 234.6 | 247.4 | 252.4 | 252.4 | | | | |
| Sinn Féin | Colm Grimes | 2.35% | 143 | 143 | 144.05 | 144.05 | 144.05 | | | | | |
| Alliance | Eric Bullick | 1.89% | 115 | 116.12 | 116.54 | 117.02 | | | | | | |
Electorate: 9,451 Valid: 6,085 (64.38%) Spoilt: 179 Quota: 761 Turnout: 6,264 (66.28%)

== 1985 Election ==
1985: 2 x SDLP, 2 x DUP, 1 x Sinn Féin, 1 x UUP, 1 x Independent Labour

Omagh Town - 7 seats
| Party | Candidate | FPv% | Count | | | | | | | | | | | | |
| Party | Candidate | FPv% | 1 | 2 | 3 | 4 | 5 | 6 | 7 | 8 | 9 | 10 | 11 | 12 | 13 |
|---|---|---|---|---|---|---|---|---|---|---|---|---|---|---|---|
| Sinn Féin | Francis Mackey | 18.74% | 1,213 | | | | | | | | | | | | |
| DUP | Oliver Gibson* | 13.10% | 848 | | | | | | | | | | | | |
| Independent Labour | Johnny McLaughlin | 12.03% | 779 | 949.04 | | | | | | | | | | | |
| SDLP | Bernadette Grant* | 9.05% | 586 | 642.55 | 674.53 | 674.57 | 676.96 | 677.04 | 682.43 | 710.76 | 747.43 | 1,002.43 | | | |
| UUP | Wilfred Breen | 7.15% | 463 | 465.73 | 466.12 | 467.92 | 468.92 | 474.48 | 479.48 | 482.48 | 484.65 | 485.69 | 485.69 | 839.69 | |
| SDLP | Stephen McKenna* | 6.50% | 421 | 448.69 | 459.22 | 459.22 | 469.22 | 469.22 | 469.22 | 503.95 | 541.06 | 624.05 | 793.34 | 796.12 | 796.39 |
| DUP | David Aiken | 7.99% | 517 | 517 | 517 | 534.16 | 534.16 | 633.48 | 636.52 | 637.91 | 637.91 | 639.95 | 640.76 | 686.92 | 710.68 |
| Alliance | Aidan Lagan* | 5.78% | 374 | 389.21 | 404.42 | 404.7 | 432.09 | 432.09 | 555.48 | 599.03 | 624.78 | 663.63 | 683.88 | 703.04 | 708.08 |
| UUP | Thomas Strain | 6.21% | 402 | 402 | 403.95 | 406.27 | 407.27 | 415.71 | 428.83 | 430.22 | 431.61 | 441.04 | 441.04 | | |
| SDLP | Arthur Breen | 5.34% | 346 | 362.77 | 369.01 | 369.13 | 374.52 | 375.52 | 377.52 | 403.98 | 428.68 | | | | |
| Irish Independence | James Sweeney | 1.16% | 75 | 156.12 | 206.04 | 206.08 | 206.08 | 206.08 | 206.08 | 217.54 | | | | | |
| Workers' Party | Hugh Gormley | 2.21% | 143 | 166.01 | 185.51 | 185.55 | 189.33 | 189.41 | 189.8 | | | | | | |
| Alliance | Richard Hinds | 1.99% | 129 | 129.78 | 130.17 | 130.33 | 151.33 | 154.33 | | | | | | | |
| DUP | Raymond Farrell | 1.62% | 105 | 105 | 105 | 116.64 | 118.64 | | | | | | | | |
| Alliance | Dermot McCormick | 1.13% | 73 | 74.95 | 76.51 | 76.51 | | | | | | | | | |
Electorate: 9,554 Valid: 6,474 (67.76%) Spoilt: 124 Quota: 810 Turnout: 6,598 (69.06%)
