= West Tyrone (District Electoral Area) =

District electoral area in Northern Ireland

- Fermanagh and Omagh District Council DEA constituency

Current constituency
- Created: 1985
- Seats: 7 (1985–2014); 6 (2014–present)
- Councillors: Mark Buchanan (DUP); Glenn Campbell (SF); Ann-Marie Donnelly (SF); Stephen McCann (SF); Colette McNulty (SF); Allan Rainey (UUP)

West Tyrone DEA within Fermanagh and Omagh

West Tyrone DEA (1993–2014) within Omagh

West Tyrone is one of the seven district electoral areas (DEA) in Fermanagh and Omagh, Northern Ireland. The district elects six members to Fermanagh and Omagh District Council and contains the wards of Dromore, Drumquin, Fairy Water, Fintona, Newtownsaville and Trillick. Omagh forms part of the West Tyrone constituencies for the Northern Ireland Assembly and UK Parliament.

It was created for the 1985 local elections, replacing Omagh Area A and Omagh Area B which had existed since 1973, where it contained seven wards (Clanabogan, Dromore, Drumquin, Fairy Water, Fintona, Newtownsaville and Trillick). For the 2014 local elections it was reduced to six wards, although it maintained the Clanabogan area.

== Councillors ==
Election	Councillor (Party)	Councillor (Party)	Councillor (Party)	Councillor (Party)	Councillor (Party)	Councillor (Party)	Councillor (Party)
2023	Glenn Campbell (Sinn Féin)	Ann-Marie Donnelly (Sinn Féin)	Stephen McCann (Sinn Féin)	Colette McNulty (Sinn Féin)	Allan Rainey (UUP)	Mark Buchanan (DUP)	5 seats 2014–present
2019	Glenn Campbell (Sinn Féin)	Ann-Marie Donnelly (Sinn Féin)	Stephen McCann (Sinn Féin)	Mary Garrity (SDLP)	Allan Rainey (UUP)	Mark Buchanan (DUP)	5 seats 2014–present
2014	Glenn Campbell (Sinn Féin)	Frankie Donnelly (Sinn Féin)	Stephen McCann (Sinn Féin)	Mary Garrity (SDLP)	Allan Rainey (UUP)	Mark Buchanan (DUP)	5 seats 2014–present
2011	Glenn Campbell (Sinn Féin)	Frankie Donnelly (Sinn Féin)	Peter Kelly (Sinn Féin)	Patrick McDonnell (SDLP)	Allan Rainey (UUP)	Thomas Buchanan (DUP)	Cecilia Quinn (Sinn Féin)
2005	Barry McElduff (Sinn Féin)	Frankie Donnelly (Sinn Féin)	Peter Kelly (Sinn Féin)	Patrick McDonnell (SDLP)	Allan Rainey (UUP)	Thomas Buchanan (DUP)	Cecilia Quinn (Sinn Féin)
2001	Barry McElduff (Sinn Féin)	Patrick Watters (Sinn Féin)	Peter Kelly (Sinn Féin)	Patrick McDonnell (SDLP)	Allan Rainey (UUP)	Thomas Buchanan (DUP)	Liam McQuaid (SDLP)
1997	Kevin McQuaid (Sinn Féin)	Cathal Quinn (Sinn Féin)	Arthur McFarland (UUP)	Patrick McDonnell (SDLP)	Allan Rainey (UUP)	Thomas Buchanan (DUP)	Liam McQuaid (SDLP)
1993	Gerry McMenamin (Sinn Féin)	Patrick Watters (Sinn Féin)	Arthur McFarland (UUP)	John Duffy (SDLP)	Allan Rainey (UUP)	Thomas Buchanan (DUP)	Liam McQuaid (SDLP)
1989	Gerry McMenamin (Sinn Féin)	Cecilia Quinn (Sinn Féin)	Arthur McFarland (UUP)	Gregory McMullan (SDLP)	Allan Rainey (UUP)	Harry Cairns (DUP)	Liam McQuaid (SDLP)
1985	Gerry McMenamin (Sinn Féin)	Cecilia Quinn (Sinn Féin)	Arthur McFarland (UUP)	Gregory McMullan (SDLP)	Robert Moses (UUP)	Harry Cairns (DUP)	Liam McQuaid (SDLP)

== 2023 Election ==
2019: 3 x Sinn Féin, 1 x DUP, 1 x UUP, 1 x SDLP

2023: 4 x Sinn Féin, 1 x DUP, 1 x UUP

2019–2023 Change: Sinn Féin gain from SDLP

West Tyrone - 6 seats
Party	Candidate	FPv%	Count			
Party	Candidate	FPv%	1	2	3	4
DUP	Mark Buchanan*	19.50%	1,619			
Sinn Féin	Glenn Campbell*	15.41%	1,279			
UUP	Allan Rainey*	9.99%	829	1,232.38		
Sinn Féin	Ann-Marie Donnelly*	13.60%	1,129	1,129.81	1,174.81	1,209.74
Sinn Féin	Colette McNulty	13.84%	1,149	1,151.43	1,163.43	1,171.20
Sinn Féin	Stephen McCann*	13.17%	1,093	1,093.00	1,112.00	1,153.16
SDLP	Mary Garrity*	8.99%	746	750.32	1,044.45	1,049.77
Alliance	Joyce Donnelly	5.51%	457	465.91		
Electorate: 12,652 Valid: 8,301 (65.61%) Spoilt: 112 Quota: 1,186 Turnout: 8,413 (66.50%)

== 2019 Election ==
2014: 3 x Sinn Féin, 1 x DUP, 1 x UUP, 1 x SDLP

2019: 3 x Sinn Féin, 1 x DUP, 1 x UUP, 1 x SDLP

2014-2019 Change: No change

West Tyrone - 6 seats
Party	Candidate	FPv%	Count					
Party	Candidate	FPv%	1	2	3	4	5	6
DUP	Mark Buchanan*	20.48%	1,546					
UUP	Allan Rainey*	14.51%	1,095					
SDLP	Mary Garrity*	13.87%	1,047	1,203.24				
Sinn Féin	Ann-Marie Donnelly	9.96%	752	752.62	772.62	772.62	1,307.62	
Sinn Féin	Glenn Campbell*	13.03%	983	986.1	1,038.1	1,038.72	1,104.72	
Sinn Féin	Stephen McCann*	11.12%	839	839.62	881.62	885.34	929.34	1,144.45
Alliance	Fia Cowan	5.17%	390	667.76	732.44	797.54	804.54	814.34
Sinn Féin	Frankie Donnelly*	8.65%	653	654.24	662.24	662.24		
Aontú	Cathal McCrory	3.21%	242	265.56				
Electorate: 12,201 Valid: 7,547 (61.86%) Spoilt: 116 Quota: 1,079 Turnout: 7,663 (62.81%)

== 2014 Election ==
2011: 4 x Sinn Féin, 1 x DUP, 1 x SDLP, 1 x UUP

2014: 3 x Sinn Féin, 1 x UUP, 1 x DUP, 1 x SDLP

2011-2014 Change: Sinn Féin loss due to the reduction of one seat

West Tyrone - 6 seats
Party	Candidate	FPv%	Count					
Party	Candidate	FPv%	1	2	3	4	5	6
Sinn Féin	Glenn Campbell*	21.38%	1,595					
UUP	Allan Rainey*	17.39%	1,297					
Sinn Féin	Frankie Donnelly*	13.91%	1,038	1,447.53				
DUP	Mark Buchanan	12.28%	916	916	916.62	1,034.16	1,071.16	
SDLP	Mary Garrity	10.51%	784	808.09	838.78	840.76	917.34	1,216.34
Sinn Féin	Stephen McCann	8.71%	650	715.34	1,036.81	1,037.35	1,051.54	1,068.54
DUP	Elaine Thompson*	7.24%	540	540.33	540.33	626.37	661.59	662.59
SDLP	Cathal Lynch	5.36%	400	407.92	419.39	421.91	461.65	
Alliance	Stephen Donnelly	2.32%	173	180.92	189.6	196.08		
Independent	Susan-Anne White	0.90%	67					
Electorate: 11,815 Valid: 7,460 (63.14%) Spoilt: 140 Quota: 1,066 Turnout: 7,600 (64.33%)

== 2011 Election ==
2005: 4 x Sinn Féin, 1 x DUP, 1 x SDLP, 1 x UUP

2011: 4 x Sinn Féin, 1 x DUP, 1 x SDLP, 1 x UUP

2005-2011 Change: No change

West Tyrone - 7 seats
Party	Candidate	FPv%	Count				
Party	Candidate	FPv%	1	2	3	4	5
Sinn Féin	Glenn Campbell	17.28%	1,375				
DUP	Thomas Buchanan*	15.90%	1,265				
SDLP	Patrick McDonnell*	15.65%	1,245				
Sinn Féin	Cecilia Quinn*	12.88%	1,025				
Sinn Féin	Frankie Donnelly*	9.01%	717	1,017.44			
UUP	Allan Rainey*	10.60%	843	845.8	888.48	1,100.48	
Sinn Féin	Peter Kelly*	9.38%	746	808.44	808.66	815.78	1,055.17
DUP	Elaine Thompson	6.27%	499	499.28	703.66	736.16	745.78
UUP	Jane Clarke	3.03%	241	243.8	265.58		
Electorate: 11,926 Valid: 7,956 (66.71%) Spoilt: 174 Quota: 995 Turnout: 8,130 (68.17%)

== 2005 Election ==
2001: 3 x Sinn Féin, 2 x SDLP, 1 x DUP, 1 x UUP

2005: 4 x Sinn Féin, 1 x SDLP, 1 x DUP, 1 x UUP

2001-2005 Change: Sinn Féin gain from SDLP

West Tyrone - 7 seats
Party	Candidate	FPv%	Count						
Party	Candidate	FPv%	1	2	3	4	5	6	7
DUP	Thomas Buchanan*	21.00%	1,810						
Sinn Féin	Barry McElduff*	17.07%	1,471						
UUP	Allan Rainey*	8.53%	735	1,141.08					
SDLP	Patrick McDonnell*	12.30%	1,060	1,063.29	1,109.19				
Sinn Féin	Cecilia Quinn	11.41%	983	983.47	1,027.75	1,146.75			
Sinn Féin	Frankie Donnelly	9.17%	790	790	990.61	1,060.93	1,072.93	1,072.93	1,084.18
Sinn Féin	Peter Kelly*	8.33%	718	718	791.44	862.92	912.92	913.08	932.58
UUP	William Bleakley	6.01%	518	824.91	824.91	856.18	856.18	918.74	918.74
SDLP	Liam McQuaid*	6.20%	534	536.35	557.41				
Electorate: 11,153 Valid: 8,619 (77.28%) Spoilt: 173 Quota: 1,078 Turnout: 8,792 (78.83%)

== 2001 Election ==
1997: 2 x Sinn Féin, 2 x SDLP, 2 x UUP, 1 x DUP

2001: 3 x Sinn Féin, 2 x SDLP, 1 x DUP, 1 x UUP

1997-2001 Change: Sinn Féin gain from UUP

West Tyrone - 7 seats
Party	Candidate	FPv%	Count							
Party	Candidate	FPv%	1	2	3	4	5	6	7	8
SDLP	Patrick McDonnell*	15.07%	1,372							
Sinn Féin	Barry McElduff	14.01%	1,276							
UUP	Allan Rainey*	12.46%	1,135	1,136.19	1,136.41	1,140.41				
DUP	Thomas Buchanan*	12.00%	1,093	1,093.34	1,093.34	1,099.34	1,334.34			
Sinn Féin	Peter Kelly	9.21%	839	856.85	884.13	894.58	925.47	925.47	1,331.47	
Sinn Féin	Patrick Watters	8.38%	763	771.16	780.18	788.23	796.62	796.62	961.65	1,132.75
SDLP	Liam McQuaid*	7.46%	679	843.05	851.08	889.77	985.68	986.68	1,057.61	1,074.72
UUP	David Sterritt	7.31%	666	666.17	666.17	668.17	689.51	861.51	861.51	862.69
Sinn Féin	Damien McCrossan	6.74%	614	622.67	696.37	728.91	750.41	751.41		
Workers' Party	Tommy Owens	2.32%	211	222.05	227.44	280.79				
DUP	Stephen Harpur	2.82%	257	257.34	257.34	258.34				
Independent	Gerry McMenamin	2.22%	202	210.67	219.8					
Electorate: 11,005 Valid: 9,107 (82.75%) Spoilt: 179 Quota: 1,139 Turnout: 9,286 (84.38%)

== 1997 Election ==
1993: 2 x UUP, 2 x SDLP, 2 x Sinn Féin, 1 x DUP

1997: 2 x UUP, 2 x SDLP, 2 x Sinn Féin, 1 x DUP

1993-1997 Change: No change

West Tyrone - 7 seats
Party	Candidate	FPv%	Count								
Party	Candidate	FPv%	1	2	3	4	5	6	7	8	9
UUP	Arthur McFarland*	16.27%	1,243								
Sinn Féin	Kevin McGrade	14.46%	1,105								
UUP	Allan Rainey*	9.52%	727	963.67							
DUP	Thomas Buchanan*	10.73%	820	843	843	843	849	891.84	1,144.84		
SDLP	Liam McQuaid*	10.51%	803	804.15	811.56	825.56	849.47	888.7	892.62	904.62	989.62
Sinn Féin	Cathal Quinn	9.86%	753	753.46	875.27	883.27	899.66	913.66	913.66	914.66	978.66
SDLP	Patrick McDonnell	8.57%	655	656.15	660.31	671.44	684.7	701.16	702.85	703.85	828.11
SDLP	James Connolly	5.58%	426	426	428.08	429.08	460.08	510.83	513.42	519.42	555.01
Workers' Party	Tommy Owens	5.07%	387	387.23	389.18	417.18	433.31	448.54	452	459	
DUP	Walter McFarland	3.85%	294	309.87	310	310	314.23	324.46			
Alliance	George Kerr	2.83%	216	219.68	220.07	221.2	231.43				
Labour Coalition	Amanda McLaughlin	1.85%	141	141.46	143.41	148.41					
Workers' Party	Tony Winters	0.92%	70	70	70.26						
Electorate: 10,521 Valid: 7,640 (72.62%) Spoilt: 208 Quota: 956 Turnout: 7,848 (74.59%)

== 1993 Election ==
1989: 2 x SDLP, 2 x UUP, 2 x Sinn Féin, 1 x DUP

1993: 2 x SDLP, 2 x UUP, 2 x Sinn Féin, 1 x DUP

1989-1993 Change: No change

West Tyrone - 7 seats
Party	Candidate	FPv%	Count						
Party	Candidate	FPv%	1	2	3	4	5	6	7
DUP	Thomas Buchanan	15.62%	1,194						
SDLP	Liam McQuaid*	15.60%	1,192						
UUP	Arthur McFarland*	14.95%	1,143						
UUP	Allan Rainey*	7.99%	611	779.59	780.64	933.44	973.44		
Sinn Féin	Gerry McMenamin*	11.72%	896	896.46	903.81	903.81	907.81	910.81	957.81
SDLP	John Duffy	7.72%	590	590.23	661.21	661.37	694.37	707.44	884.55
Sinn Féin	Patrick Watters	9.17%	701	701.46	719.52	719.68	719.68	721.47	762.46
SDLP	James Connolly	6.45%	493	493.69	597.43	597.91	619.65	638.57	698.26
Workers' Party	Tommy Owens	4.81%	368	368.92	395.59	396.07	431.12	456.1	
UUP	William Wilson	3.65%	279	338.34	339.6	362.8	383.3		
Alliance	Eric Bullick	2.30%	176	181.75	185.11	187.03			
Electorate: 10,209 Valid: 7,643 (74.87%) Spoilt: 200 Quota: 956 Turnout: 7,843 (76.82%)

== 1989 Election ==
1985: 2 x UUP, 2 x SDLP, 2 x Sinn Féin, 1 x DUP

1989: 2 x UUP, 2 x SDLP, 2 x Sinn Féin, 1 x DUP

1985-1989 Change: No change

West Tyrone - 7 seats
Party	Candidate	FPv%	Count									
Party	Candidate	FPv%	1	2	3	4	5	6	7	8	9	10
UUP	Arthur McFarland*	17.28%	1,314									
SDLP	Liam McQuaid*	14.63%	1,112									
UUP	Allan Rainey	10.92%	830	1,135.1								
DUP	Harry Cairns*	10.94%	832	856.03	961.6							
Sinn Féin	Gerry McMenamin*	11.02%	838	838.27	838.27	841.42	841.42	841.42	923.42	927.57	927.74	979.19
Sinn Féin	Cecilia Quinn*	10.02%	762	762.27	762.44	777.74	777.74	778.01	860.31	865.76	866.76	890.08
SDLP	Gregory McMullan*	5.54%	421	421.27	421.61	512.51	512.51	512.51	517.66	560.11	567.32	748.7
SDLP	James Connolly	6.43%	489	489	489.17	520.07	520.08	521.25	540.4	574.64	587.63	636.42
Workers' Party	Tommy Owens	4.16%	316	316.81	317.83	328.33	328.33	329.03	333.03	398.72	417.27	
DUP	Raymond Farrell	1.79%	136	145.18	173.4	173.55	177.63	313.27	314.27	332.98		
Alliance	Ann Gormley	2.80%	213	215.97	225.32	228.17	228.22	231.49	235.64			
Sinn Féin	William McLaughlin	2.87%	218	218	218	218.9	218.9	218.9				
DUP	Raymond Little	1.59%	121	129.91	165.61	165.61	167.22					
Electorate: 9,836 Valid: 7,602 (77.29%) Spoilt: 243 Quota: 951 Turnout: 7,845 (79.76%)

== 1985 Election ==
1985: 2 x UUP, 2 x SDLP, 2 x Sinn Féin, 1 x DUP

West Tyrone - 7 seats
Party	Candidate	FPv%	Count												
Party	Candidate	FPv%	1	2	3	4	5	6	7	8	9	10	11	12	13
UUP	Arthur McFarland*	14.98%	1,186												
Sinn Féin	Cathal Quinn	14.03%	1,111												
DUP	Harry Cairns	11.85%	938	952.24	952.24	952.24	1,029.24								
UUP	Robert Moses*	7.96%	630	790.8	790.91	790.91	809.79	815.19	848.51	856.78	1,107.78				
SDLP	Liam McQuaid*	10.60%	839	839.32	861.65	870.98	871.3	871.3	896.3	934.4	935.1	940.1	1,161.1		
Sinn Féin	Gerry McMenamin	9.32%	738	738	799.16	799.16	800.16	800.16	803.16	830.93	831.93	831.93	840.26	842.96	980.41
SDLP	Gregory McMullan	4.98%	394	394.32	394.54	397.54	399.54	399.54	435.54	502.98	503.46	504.46	578.68	727.18	879.22
Sinn Féin	James McElhinney	5.38%	426	426	448.11	471.33	473.33	473.33	475.33	479.55	479.55	480.55	526.88	539.48	584.14
Irish Independence	Patrick Donnelly*	4.38%	347	347	349.97	420.3	420.41	420.41	429.41	473.52	473.52	474.52	488.74	495.94	
SDLP	John Skelton*	4.67%	370	370.16	372.58	395.85	395.85	395.85	402.85	417.85	418.39	421.39			
DUP	George Thompson	3.39%	268	273.76	273.76	273.76	322.52	356	362.32	364.48					
Workers' Party	Tommy Owens	2.58%	204	204.32	207.62	209.62	209.62	209.62	244.62						
Alliance	Eric Bullick	2.21%	175	175.8	175.8	175.8	175.8	175.8							
DUP	Hazel McKenzie	1.91%	151	156.6	156.71	157.71									
Irish Independence	James Connolly	1.77%	140	140.16	141.15										
Electorate: 9,690 Valid: 7,917 (81.70%) Spoilt: 174 Quota: 990 Turnout: 8,091 (83.50%)
