= Catherine Kelly =

Northern Irish politician (born 1987)

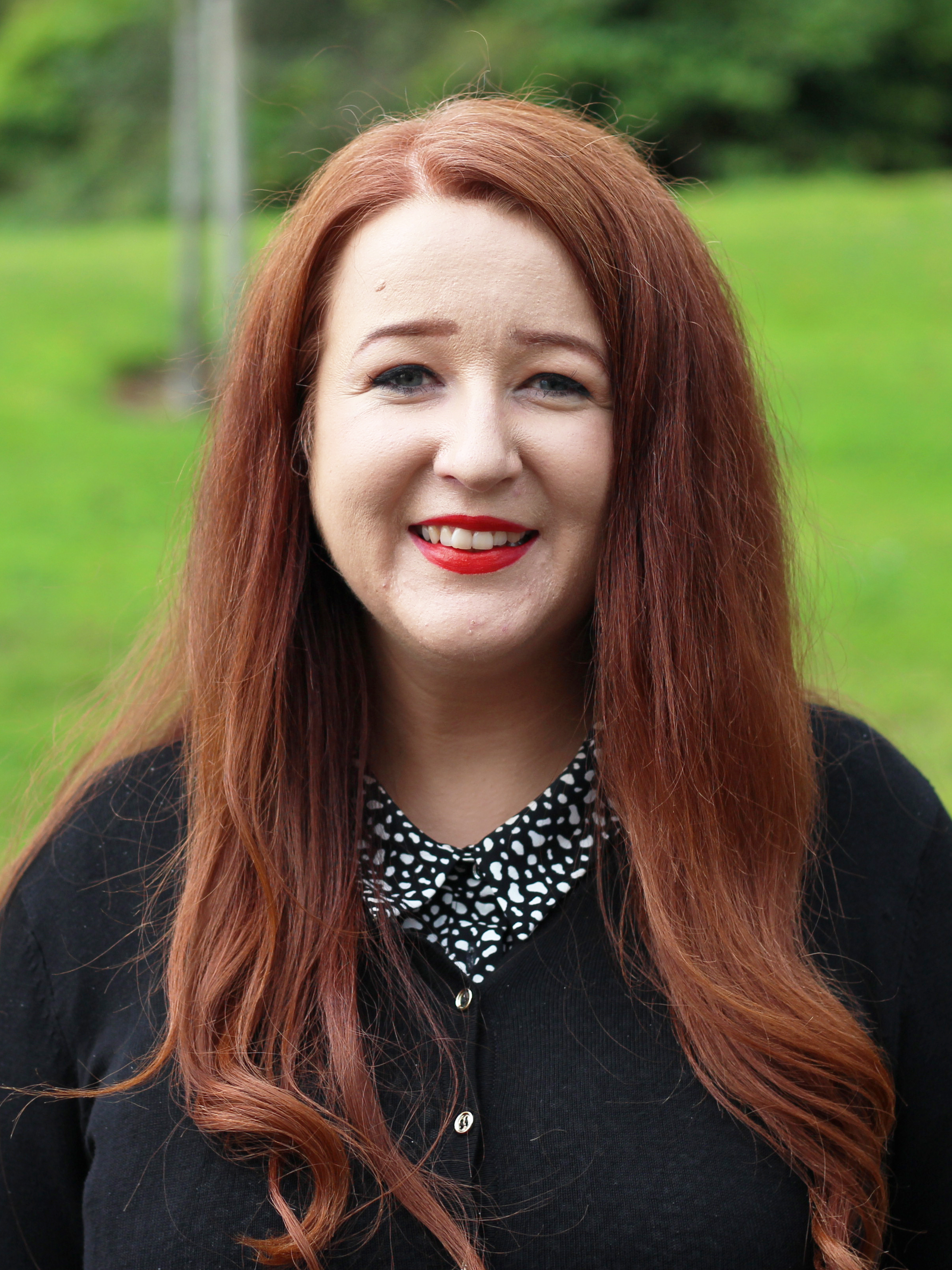

Member of Fermanagh and Omagh District Council
- Incumbent
- Assumed office 18 May 2023
- Preceded by: Matthew Bell
- Constituency: Omagh

Member of the Legislative Assembly for West Tyrone
- In office 20 June 2017 – 31 October 2020
- Preceded by: Barry McElduff
- Succeeded by: Nicola Brogan

Personal details
- Born: Catherine Kelly; 27 June 1987 (age 39) Loughmacrory, County Tyrone, Northern Ireland
- Party: Sinn Féin
- Education: Liverpool John Moores University

Catherine Kelly MLA (born 27 June 1987) is a Sinn Féin politician from Loughmacrory, County Tyrone, who served as Member of the Legislative Assembly for the West Tyrone constituency in the Northern Ireland Assembly June 2017 until her resignation in October 2020.

== Education ==
Kelly studied English and History at Liverpool John Moores University and Early Childhood Studies at South West College in Omagh.

== Nursery school teacher ==
She also worked at an Irish language nursery school.

== Sinn Féin and political career ==
Kelly joined Sinn Féin in 2009 and stood as a candidate in the local elections in Omagh Town in 2014. She worked as an advisor to Barry McElduff. After the 2017 general election, she was co-opted to the Northern Ireland Assembly to represent the West Tyrone constituency following McElduff's election to the House of Commons. Kelly resigned on 31 October 2020 following controversy over a small-business grant related to the COVID-19 epidemic. She was replaced on the assembly by Nicola Brogan.

Northern Ireland Assembly
Preceded by Barry McElduff	MLA for West Tyrone; 2017–present	Incumbent
