= Órfhlaith Begley =

Northern Irish politician (born 1991)

Órfhlaith Begley MP
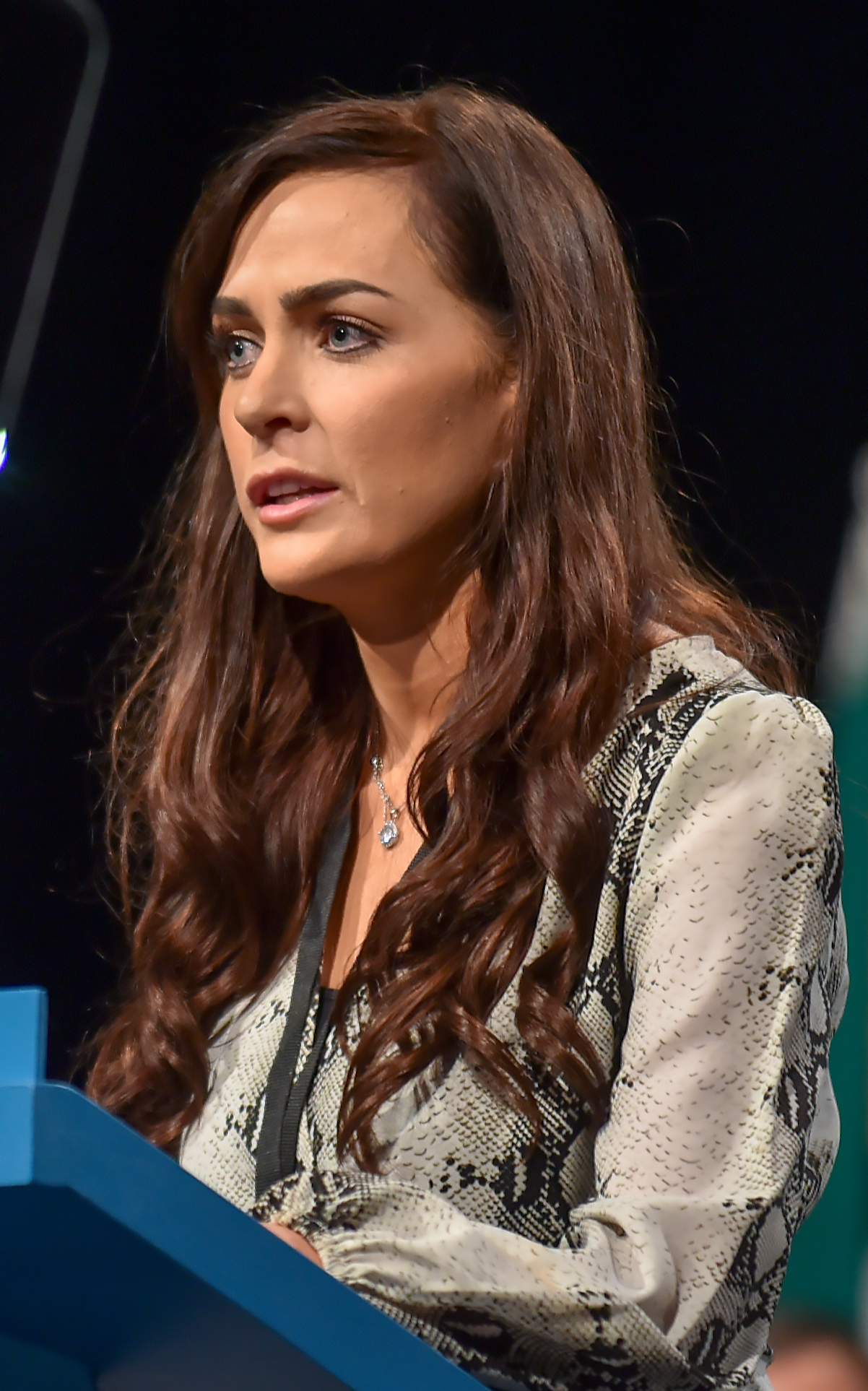
- Begley in 2019

Member of Parliament for West Tyrone
- Incumbent
- Assumed office 3 May 2018
- Preceded by: Barry McElduff
- Majority: 15,917 (36.5%)

Personal details
- Born: Órfhlaith Acile Begley; 19 December 1991 (age 34) Carrickmore, Northern Ireland
- Party: Sinn Féin
- Spouse: Conor Carson (m. 2022)
- Education: Queen's University Belfast

Órfhlaith Acile Begley (/ˈɔːrlə/; born 19 December 1991) is an Irish Sinn Féin politician and solicitor who has served as Member of Parliament (MP) for West Tyrone since a 2018 by-election.

== Early life and career ==
Begley was born on 19 December 1991 in Carrickmore, County Tyrone, Northern Ireland. She is the daughter of former Sinn Féin Omagh District Council chairman Seán Begley. Begley grew up in Carrickmore, and played Gaelic football at the local club. She studied Law and Politics at the Queen's University Belfast. She then studied at the Institute of Professional and Legal Studies, graduating as a solicitor. Begley then worked as a solicitor in Portadown, County Armagh with her brother.

== Political career ==
Begley was selected as the Sinn Féin candidate for West Tyrone in the 2018 West Tyrone by-election on 26 February. The by-election had been called following the resignation of the previous Sinn Féin MP Barry McElduff on 15 January, after he had posted a video to Twitter appearing to make light of the Kingsmill massacre. She was elected with a majority of 7,956. Begley was the first female MP to represent the constituency since it was created in 1997. She held the seat in the 2019 general election with a majority of 7,478. Begley retained her seat in the 2024 general election with an increased majority of 15,917. She does not sit in the House of Commons, given her party's long-standing policy of abstentionism.

== Personal life ==
Begley became engaged to engineer Conor Carson in February 2021, and they married on 29 December 2022 in Carrickmore.

Parliament of the United Kingdom
Preceded by Barry McElduff	Member of Parliament for West Tyrone; 2018–present	Incumbent
