= Barry McElduff =

Northern Irish Sinn Féin politician

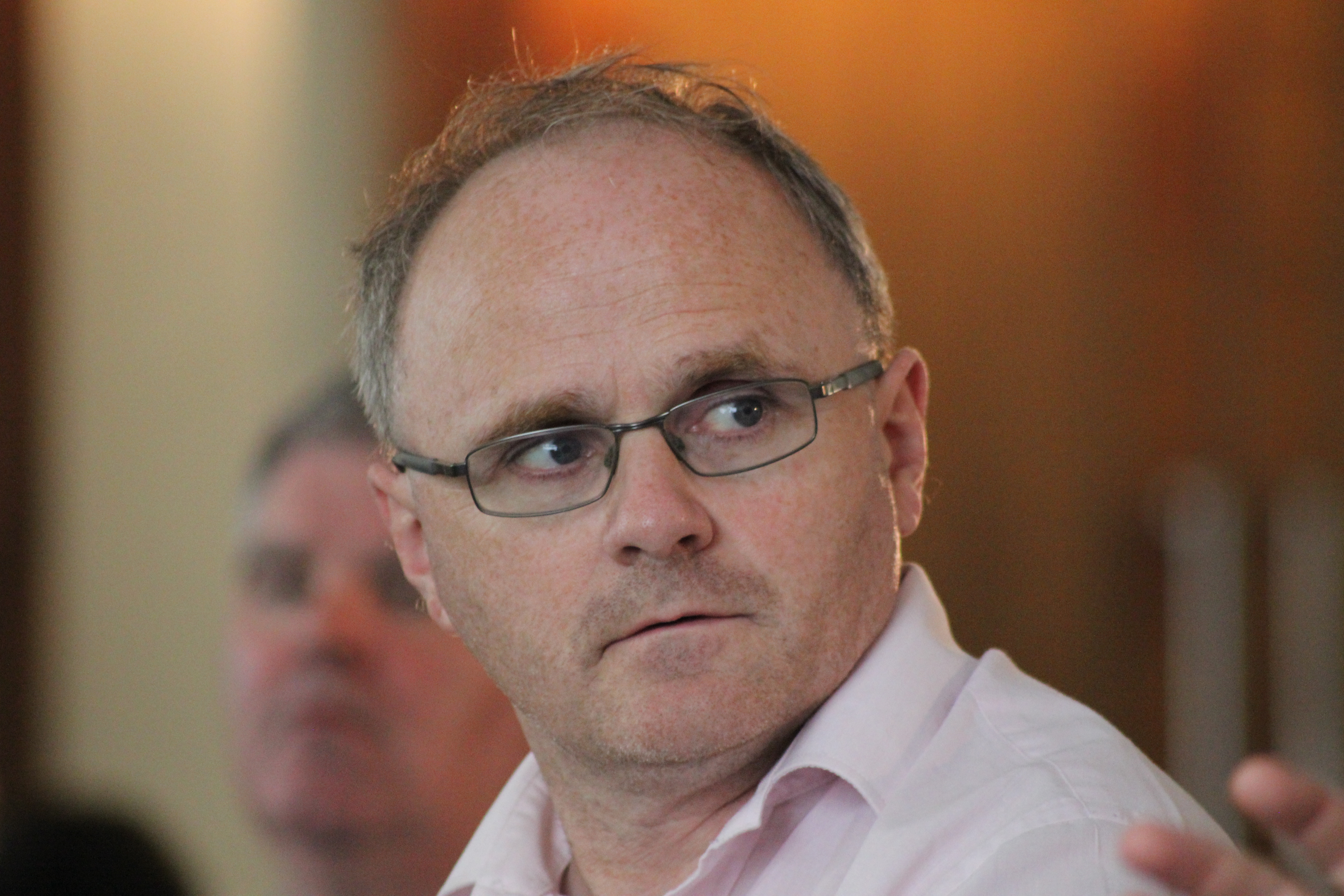

Member of Fermanagh and Omagh District Council
- Incumbent
- Assumed office 4 May 2019
- Preceded by: Joanne Donnelly
- Constituency: Omagh

Member of Parliament for West Tyrone
- In office 8 June 2017 – 16 January 2018
- Preceded by: Pat Doherty
- Succeeded by: Órfhlaith Begley

Member of the Northern Ireland Assembly for West Tyrone
- In office 25 June 1998 – 9 June 2017
- Preceded by: Constituency established
- Succeeded by: Catherine Kelly

Member of Omagh District Council
- In office 7 June 2001 – 5 May 2011
- Preceded by: Kevin McQuaid
- Succeeded by: Glenn Campbell
- Constituency: West Tyrone

Northern Ireland Forum Member for West Tyrone
- In office 30 May 1996 – 25 April 1998
- Preceded by: New forum
- Succeeded by: Forum dissolved

Personal details
- Born: 16 August 1966 (age 60) Aghagogan, Northern Ireland
- Party: Sinn Féin
- Spouse: Paula McElduff
- Education: Queen's University Belfast

Columba Barry McElduff (Irish: Colmcille Barra Mac Giolla Dhuibh; born 16 August 1966) is an Irish Sinn Féin politician. He was the Member of Parliament (MP) for the West Tyrone UK parliament constituency. He was also a Member of the Legislative Assembly in the Northern Ireland Assembly from its creation in 1998 until his election as MP in 2017. He resigned his seat on 16 January 2018 after publishing a video of himself balancing a Kingsmill loaf on his head, on the date of the anniversary of the Kingsmill massacre.

== Early life ==
McElduff was born on 16 August 1966 in County Tyrone, Northern Ireland, and was raised in the Aghagogan townland. He was educated at the Christian Brothers Grammar School in Omagh, before attending Queen's University Belfast. He became an Irish republican activist for Sinn Féin.

== Career ==
In 1992 McElduff was given an 18-month suspended sentence for assisting the Provisional Irish Republican Army (IRA) in the false imprisonment of a suspected police informer.

At the 1992 general election, he unsuccessfully contested Mid Ulster. He was elected to the Northern Ireland Forum for the West Tyrone constituency in 1996, and has since held this seat on the Northern Ireland Assembly.

McElduff has chaired the Culture, Arts and Leisure Committee of the Assembly and has served previously on other committees, including Office of the First Minister and deputy First Minister, Education and Employment and Learning.

In 2000, McElduff was elected to Omagh District Council. In 2012, McElduff and Lord Laird visited Scotland to learn more about potential Scottish independence. At the snap general election held on 8 June 2017, he became MP for West Tyrone.

McElduff is known for performing comedy sets at Sinn Féin events, and in 2015 performed a stand-up gig in Omagh. He is also known for posting comedic videos on social media. McElduff has published two books: Keep er' Lit (2012) contains short stories and anecdotes from his experiences of republicanism, Gaelic games and community activism, while Sustain the Flame (2015) looks back at his forays into social media.

=== Resignation ===
On 5 January 2018, McElduff tweeted a video of himself in a shop with a loaf of Kingsmill bread on his head, asking where the shop kept its bread. As it coincided with the 42nd anniversary of the Kingsmill massacre—where the Provisional Irish Republican Army murdered ten Protestant civilians—unionists accused him of mocking the massacre and the video was widely criticised, including by nationalists. Democratic Unionist Party leader Arlene Foster said "mocking is depraved" and called the video "inhuman". McElduff deleted it and apologised, saying he was not alluding to the massacre and offering to meet the victims' families. On 8 January, Sinn Féin apologised for McElduff's actions, condemned the video, and suspended him from Sinn Féin for three months. McElduff announced on 15 January that he was resigning his seat. On 16 January the Chancellor of the Exchequer appointed Barry McElduff as the Steward and Bailiff of the Three Hundreds of Chiltern, a nominal office of profit under the Crown which causes the holder's parliamentary seat to be vacated.

== See also ==
- List of United Kingdom MPs with the shortest service

Northern Ireland Forum
New forum	Member of the Northern Ireland Forum for West Tyrone; 1996–1998	Forum dissolved
Northern Ireland Assembly
New assembly	Member of the Legislative Assembly for West Tyrone; 1998–2017	Succeeded by Catherine Kelly
Parliament of the United Kingdom
Preceded by Pat Doherty	Member of Parliament for West Tyrone; 2017–2018	Succeeded by Órfhlaith Begley
