= Oliver Gibson (politician) =

Member of Omagh District Council
- In office 15 May 1985 – 5 May 2005
- Preceded by: New district
- Succeeded by: Clive McFarland
- Constituency: Omagh Town
- In office 20 May 1981 – 15 May 1985
- Preceded by: Cecil Walker
- Succeeded by: District abolished
- Constituency: Omagh Area C

Member of the Northern Ireland Assembly for West Tyrone
- In office 25 June 1998 – 26 November 2003
- Preceded by: New Creation
- Succeeded by: Thomas Buchanan

Member of the Northern Ireland Forum for West Tyrone
- In office 30 May 1996 – 25 April 1998
- Preceded by: New forum
- Succeeded by: Forum dissolved

Personal details
- Born: 28 June 1934 Beragh, County Tyrone, Northern Ireland
- Died: 27 April 2018 (aged 83) Ballymoney, County Antrim, Northern Ireland
- Party: Democratic Unionist Party
- Education: Queen's University Belfast
- Other organizations: Orange Order; Apprentice Boys of Derry

Oliver Gibson (28 June 1934 – 27 April 2018) was a Northern Irish politician who was a founding member of the Democratic Unionist Party (DUP) and served as a DUP councillor for West Tyrone. He also served as an MLA for West Tyrone in the first session of the Assembly.

== Background ==
Gibson had been a teacher and vice-principal in Omagh High School as well as a Lieutenant in the Ulster Defence Regiment. In December 1974 it was reported that Lieutenant Gibson and a Corporal had been charged with the assault of two men in Omagh causing them actual bodily harm.

In October 1983 Gibson announced the creation of a co-operative with a £1 million fund to promote Protestant businesses in the Mid-Tyrone area. A leaflet giving details of the venture stated that shareholder membership "shall be solely Protestant". The Omagh Alliance Party association criticised the proposal, saying it was "ludicrous" that the primary aim of a business co-operative was to "stop the enroachment of the Church of Rome`".

In 1990 it was reported that Gibson had been "kicked out" of the Apprentice Boys of Derry because of his opposition to their application to the International Fund for Ireland for grant support. Gibson described the application as seeking "blood money".

His niece, Esther Gibson, was one of the 29 victims killed in the 1998 Omagh bombing.

In 1999, David Jordan, a former Ulster Defence Regiment soldier, broke down in a bar and claimed to be part of a patrol that killed a nationalist councillor, Patsy Kelly, in 1974. Jordan reportedly implicated Gibson in the murder. Jordan was never formally questioned in relation to the matter and no charges were ever brought against Gibson.

In 2003, it emerged that Gibson was having an affair with his 35-year-old secretary Audrey McKenzie and was living with her in Ballybogy, County Antrim. His wife confirmed that he had left her and was no longer living in their Sixmilecross home. He retired as a councillor in Omagh District Council shortly afterwards.

Northern Ireland Forum
New forum	Member for West Tyrone; 1996–1998	Forum dissolved
Northern Ireland Assembly
New assembly	MLA for Tyrone, West; 1998–2003	Succeeded by Thomas Buchanan
