= Paddy McGowan =

Politician from Northern Ireland

Patrick McGowan

Member of Omagh District Council
- In office 17 May 1989 – 22 May 2014
- Preceded by: Bernadette Grant
- Succeeded by: Council abolished
- Constituency: Omagh Town
- In office 15 May 1985 – 17 May 1989
- Preceded by: New district
- Succeeded by: Seamus Shields
- Constituency: Mid Tyrone

Northern Ireland Forum Member for West Tyrone
- In office 30 May 1996 – 25 April 1998
- Preceded by: New forum
- Succeeded by: Forum dissolved

Personal details
- Born: County Tyrone, Northern Ireland
- Party: Independent (from 1998)
- Other political affiliations: Social Democratic and Labour (until 1998)

John Patrick McGowan, known as Paddy McGowan, is a Northern Irish politician.

== Background ==
McGowan worked in the fire service before joining the Social Democratic and Labour Party (SDLP).

In 1981, McGowan stood for the SDLP in Omagh District "C", but was not elected. In 1985, he was elected in Mid Tyrone, and in 1989, he moved to represent Omagh Town.

McGowan was elected to the Northern Ireland Forum in 1996, representing West Tyrone. He held his council seat in 1997, but left the SDLP in 1998, complaining that it had become too nationalist.

McGowan stood as an "Independent Community Candidate" at the 1998 Northern Ireland Assembly election, but did not come close to taking a seat. Despite this, he held his council seat as an independent in 2001 and 2005. He is the Chairman of Omagh Safer Streets, holds an MBE and is a justice of the peace.

Northern Ireland Forum
New forum	Member for West Tyrone; 1996–1998	Forum dissolved
