= Thomas Buchanan (Unionist politician) =

British politician (born 1963)

Thomas Buchanan MLA
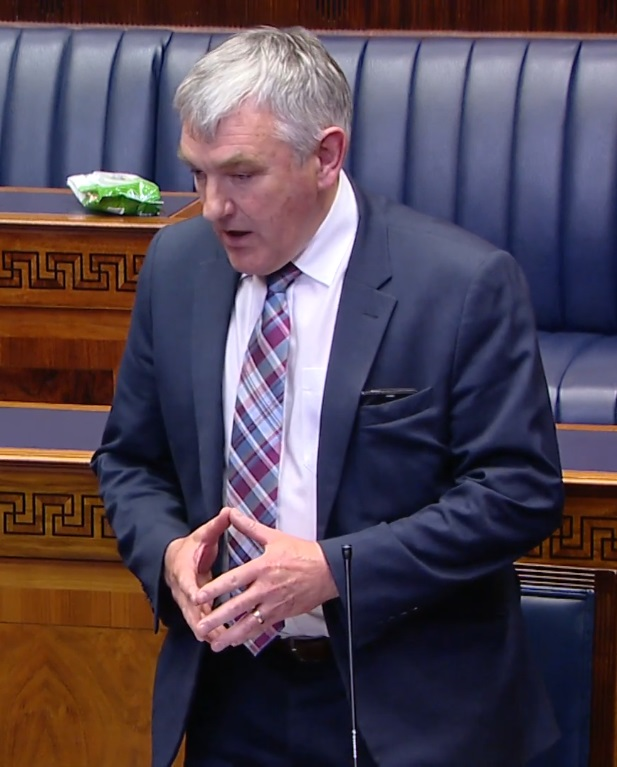
- Buchanan in 2021

Member of the Northern Ireland Assembly for West Tyrone
- Incumbent
- Assumed office 26 November 2003
- Preceded by: Oliver Gibson

Member of Omagh District Council
- In office 19 May 1993 – 22 May 2014
- Preceded by: Harry Cairns
- Succeeded by: Council abolished
- Constituency: West Tyrone

Personal details
- Born: 30 June 1963 (age 63) Drumquin, County Tyrone, Northern Ireland
- Party: Democratic Unionist Party
- Occupation: Contractor

Thomas Buchanan MLA (born 30 July 1963) is a Democratic Unionist Party (DUP) politician, serving as a Member of the Northern Ireland Assembly (MLA) for West Tyrone since 2003. Buchanan is the DUP Spokesperson for Victims Rights and Groups Liaison. He is also one of the DUP's members of the Northern Ireland Policing Board.

== Background ==
He was educated at Langfield Primary School, Castlederg Secondary School, and at Omagh Technical College.

== Political career ==
In 1993 he was elected to Omagh District Council and became its youngest member and in 2004 was voted Vice Chairman.

=== Member of the Northern Ireland Assembly ===
Buchanan was first elected to the Northern Ireland Assembly at the 2003 election, taking the fourth seat in West Tyrone.

In July 2010, he complained about a display of bunting inside an Omagh bank that celebrated a success by the Tyrone GAA team. The bank had been sponsoring the Ulster Championship. Buchanan accused the Gaelic Athletic Association (GAA) of being a political and Irish republican organisation.

On 25 October 2013 Buchanan told school children attending a public event that homosexuality is an 'abomination'.

Buchanan believes in creationism. In September 2016 he supported an event promoting the teaching of creationism in every school, stating that "I’m someone who believes in creationism and that the world was spoken into existence in six days by His power".

He was the DUP candidate in West Tyrone in the 2024 United Kingdom general election.

Northern Ireland Assembly
Preceded by Oliver Gibson	MLA for West Tyrone; 2003–present	Incumbent
