= Omagh District Council =

Former local council in Northern Ireland

Coordinates: 54.600°N 7.298°W

Omagh District
- Coat of Arms

- Area: 1,130 km^{2} (440 sq mi); Ranked 2nd of 26
- District HQ: Omagh
- Catholic: 70.3%
- Protestant: 27.4%
- Country: Northern Ireland
- Sovereign state: United Kingdom
- Councillors: MLAs West Tyrone Sinn Féin: 3 DUP: 1 SDLP: 1; MPs Órfhlaith Begley (Sinn Féin)
- Website: www.omagh.gov.uk

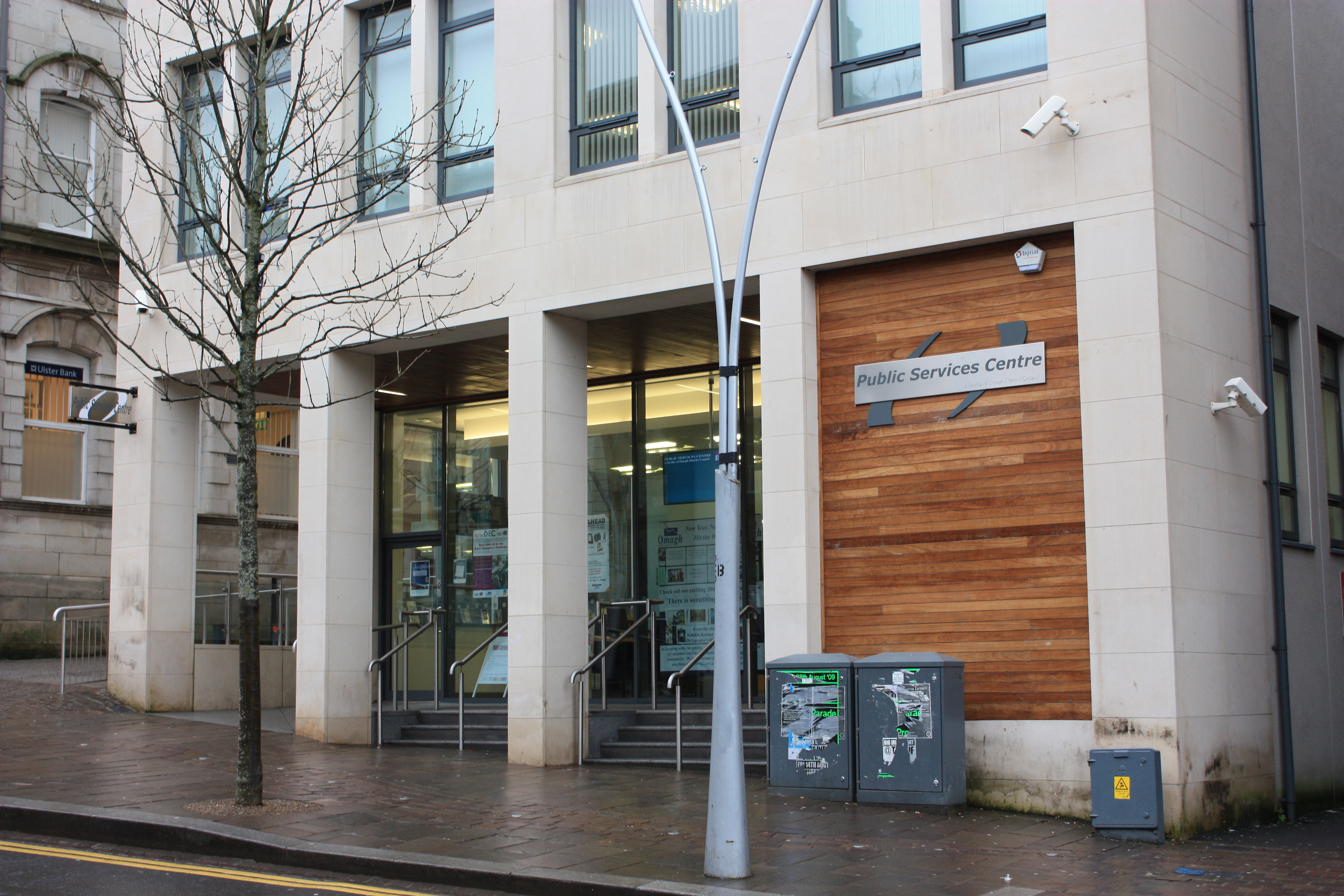
Public Services Centre, High Street, Omagh, January 2010

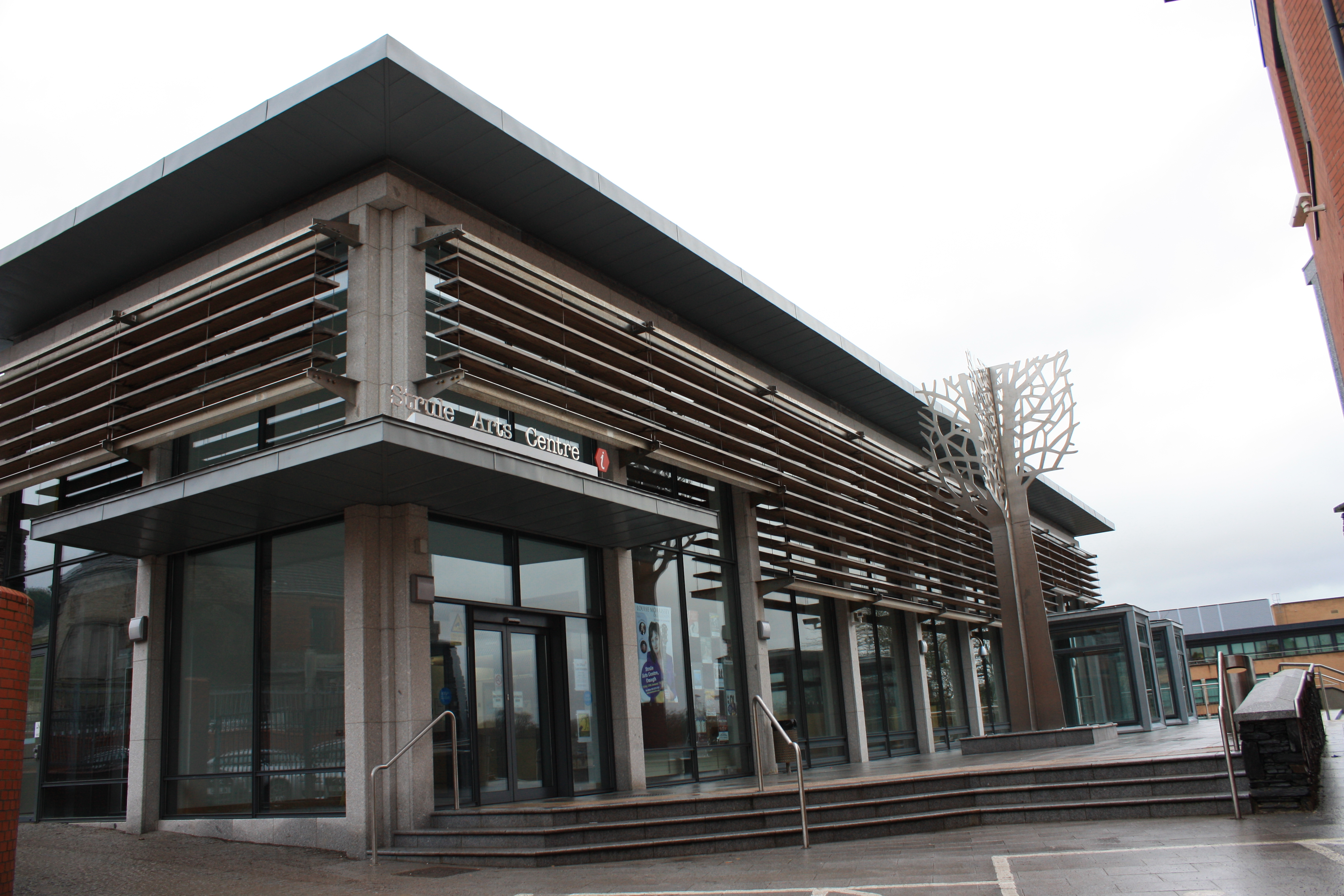
Strule Arts Centre, Townhall Square, Omagh, January 2010

Omagh District Council was a local council in Northern Ireland. It merged with Fermanagh District Council in April 2015 under local government reorganisation to become Fermanagh and Omagh District Council.

Its headquarters was in the town of Omagh, which is the traditional county town of Tyrone. The council area was about 440 square miles (1,100 km^{2}), making it the second largest local council area in Northern Ireland (by area) with a population of just over 50,000 (25,000 of whom lived in Omagh town). Apart from Omagh the area of the former District Council contains smaller towns including Drumquin, Dromore, Trillick, Fintona, Beragh, Carrickmore and Sixmilecross.

The council was established in 1973 and originally had 20 councillors but following a review of local government boundaries in the early 1980s, the number of councillors was increased to 21. Omagh District Council consisted of three electoral areas: Omagh Town, Mid Tyrone and West Tyrone. In the last elections in 2011 members were elected from the following political parties: 10 Sinn Féin, 3 Social Democratic and Labour Party (SDLP), 3 Ulster Unionist Party (UUP), 3 Democratic Unionist Party (DUP) and 2 Independents. The election of Chairman and Vice Chairman of the Council took place annually in June.

== 2011 election results ==
Map of the district's DEAs from 1993 to 2014

Party		seats	change +/-
•	Sinn Féin	10	=
•	Democratic Unionist Party	3	=
•	Ulster Unionist Party	3	=
•	Social Democratic and Labour Party	3	=
•	Independent	2	=

== 2005 election results ==
Party		seats	change +/-
•	Sinn Féin	10	+2
•	Democratic Unionist Party	3	+1
•	Ulster Unionist Party	3	=
•	Social Democratic and Labour Party	3	-3
•	Independent	2	=

In both the Westminster Parliament and the Northern Ireland Assembly, Omagh was completely contained within the West Tyrone constituency.

== Review of Public Administration ==
Under the Review of Public Administration (RPA), the council was due to merge with Fermanagh District Council in 2011 to form a single council for the enlarged area totalling 2829 km^{2} and a population of 105,479. The next election was due to take place in May 2009, but on 25 April 2008, Shaun Woodward, Secretary of State for Northern Ireland announced that the scheduled 2009 district council elections were to be postponed until the introduction of the eleven new councils in 2011.

== Population ==
The former council area (especially Omagh town) has seen significant growth in the past few years, with the population rising by the most in years. Many housing estates and shopping areas have sprung up in recent times as well.

Population:

- 1982: 44,417
- 1992: 46,372
- 2002: 48,919
- 2004: 50,082
- Population Density – 44 per km^{2}
- Home Ownership – 72%
- Unemployment – 4.5%
- Car Ownership (Households) – 75%
- 16–74 Population in Work – 56%

The area covered by Omagh District Council had a population of 51,536 residents according to the 2011 Northern Ireland census.

== Facilities ==
The council owned and ran the Strule Arts Centre in Omagh town centre.

== See also ==
- Local government in Northern Ireland
