= 2005 Ards Borough Council election =

Local government election in Northern Ireland

- 5 May 2005

All 23 seats to Ards Borough Council 12 seats needed for a majority
	First party	Second party	Third party
Party	DUP	UUP	Alliance
Seats won	12	7	3
Seat change	▲3	▼1	▼1
	Fourth party	Fifth party
Party	SDLP	Independent
Seats won	1	0
Seat change	Steady	▼1
- Party with the most votes by district.

Elections to Ards Borough Council were held on 5 May 2005 on the same day as the other Northern Irish local government elections. The election used four district electoral areas to elect a total of 23 councillors.

== Election results ==
Ards Borough Council Election Result 2005
Party	Seats	Gains	Losses	Net gain/loss	Seats %	Votes %	Votes	+/−
DUP	12	3	0	▲3	52.2	52.4	13,897	▲15.4
UUP	7	0	1	▼1	30.4	24.5	6,493	▼7.2
Alliance	3	0	1	▼1	13.0	14.1	3,733	▼2.6
SDLP	1	0	0	Steady	4.3	3.4	913	▼0.5
Independent	0	0	1	▼1	0.0	3.8	1,006	▼6.0
Sinn Féin	0	0	0	Steady	0.0	1.1	292	▲1.1
Green (NI)	0	0	0	Steady	0.0	0.7	182	▲0.7

Note: "Votes" are the first preference votes.

== Districts summary ==
Results of the Ards Borough Council election, 2005 by district
Ward	%	Cllrs	%	Cllrs	%	Cllrs	%	Cllrs	%	Cllrs	Total Cllrs
Ward	DUP		UUP		Alliance		SDLP		Others		Total Cllrs
Ards East	56.1	4	28.6	2	11.2	0	0.0	0	4.1	0	6
Ards West	53.0	3	31.8	2	15.3	1	0.0	0	0.0	0	6
Newtownards	50.8	2	24.3	2	14.4	1	0.0	0	10.5	0	6
Peninsula	48.8	2	11.4	1	16.0	1	14.8	1	9.0	0	5
Total	52.4	12	24.5	7	14.1	3	3.4	1	5.6	0	23

== Districts results ==
=== Ards East ===
2001: 3 x UUP, 2 x DUP, 1 x Alliance
2005: 4 x DUP, 2 x UUP
2001-2005 Change: DUP gain (two seats) from UUP and Alliance

Ards East - 6 seats
Party	Candidate	FPv%	Count					
Party	Candidate	FPv%	1	2	3	4	5	6
DUP	Jonathan Bell	19.92%	1,515					
DUP	Terence Williams*	13.07%	994	1,097.6				
DUP	John Elliott*	10.70%	814	1,060.68	1,081.52	1,099.52		
UUP	Ronald Ferguson*	13.05%	993	1,006.72	1,056.56	1,247.56		
DUP	Hamilton Gregory*	12.40%	943	977.16	1,000.44	1,038.52	1,054.36	1,063.96
UUP	Jeffrey Magill*	8.20%	624	628.2	650.2	942.88	1,062.67	1,063.63
Alliance	Linda Cleland*	11.17%	850	858.68	959.96	1,012.08	1,036.83	1,038.75
UUP	Tom Smith	7.36%	560	566.72	633.28			
Green (NI)	John McCullough	2.39%	182	183.4				
Independent	Thomas Sheridan	1.74%	132	134.8				
Electorate: 15,367 Valid: 7,607 (49.50%) Spoilt: 181 Quota: 1,087 Turnout: 7,788 (50.68%)

=== Ards West ===
2001: 3 x DUP, 2 x UUP, 1 x Alliance
2005: 3 x DUP, 2 x UUP, 1 x Alliance
2001-2005 Change: No change

Ards West - 6 seats
Party	Candidate	FPv%	Count			
Party	Candidate	FPv%	1	2	3	4
DUP	Margaret Craig*	17.51%	1,227			
Alliance	Jim McBriar*	15.27%	1,070			
UUP	Robert Gibson*	14.04%	984	1,003.26		
UUP	James Fletcher	11.36%	796	804.1	1,154.1	
DUP	William Montgomery*	13.69%	959	994.28	1,021.28	
DUP	Mervyn Oswald	12.56%	880	893.14	915.04	981.04
DUP	David Gilmore*	9.21%	645	784.14	798.04	851.04
UUP	Philip Smith*	6.37%	446	449.78		
Electorate: 12,766 Valid: 7,007 (54.89%) Spoilt: 140 Quota: 1,002 Turnout: 7,147 (55.98%)

=== Newtownards ===
2001: 2 x DUP, 2 x UUP, 1 x Alliance, 1 x Independent
2005: 3 x DUP, 2 x UUP, 1 x Alliance
2001-2005 Change: DUP gain from Independent

Newtownards - 6 seats
Party	Candidate	FPv%	Count			
Party	Candidate	FPv%	1	2	3	4
DUP	George Ennis*	22.66%	1,296			
Alliance	Alan McDowell*	14.39%	823			
DUP	Simon Hamilton	8.57%	490	840.76		
DUP	Michelle McIlveen	10.89%	623	652.23	1,005.23	
UUP	Thomas Hamilton*	12.87%	736	766.34	820.7	
UUP	David Smyth*	11.38%	651	660.62	688.91	774.91
Independent	Wilbert Magill*	10.56%	604	617.69	668.09	716.09
DUP	Hamilton Lawther*	8.67%	496	536.33		
Electorate: 11,945 Valid: 5,719 (47.88%) Spoilt: 130 Quota: 818 Turnout: 5,849 (48.97%)

=== Peninsula ===
2001: 2 x DUP, 1 x Alliance, 1 x SDLP, 1 x UUP
2005: 2 x DUP, 1 x Alliance, 1 x SDLP, 1 x UUP
2001-2005 Change: No change

Peninsula - 5 seats
Party	Candidate	FPv%	Count			
Party	Candidate	FPv%	1	2	3	4
DUP	Jim Shannon*	31.44%	1,944			
Alliance	Kieran McCarthy*	16.01%	990	1,074.13		
SDLP	Joe Boyle	14.77%	913	918.17	1,303.17	
DUP	Robert Drysdale*	10.72%	663	1,024.43	1,034.43	
UUP	Angus Carson*	11.37%	703	801.7	854.93	937.93
DUP	Colin Kennedy	6.60%	408	745.93	761.69	774.69
Sinn Féin	Anthony Lacken	4.72%	292	293.88		
Independent	Daniel McCarthy*	4.37%	270	281.28		
Electorate: 11,725 Valid: 6,183 (52.73%) Spoilt: 130 Quota: 1,031 Turnout: 6,313 (53.84%)
