= 1997 Ards Borough Council election =

Local government election in Northern Ireland

- 21 May 1997

All 23 seats to Ards Borough Council 12 seats needed for a majority
	First party	Second party	Third party
Party	UUP	DUP	Alliance
Seats won	10	5	5
Seat change	▲1	▼1	▼1
	Fourth party	Fifth party	Sixth party
Party	SDLP	Ind. Unionist	Independent
Seats won	1	2	0
Seat change	▲1	▲1	▼1
- Results by district electoral area, shaded by First Preference Votes.

Elections to Ards Borough Council were held on 21 May 1997 on the same day as the other Northern Irish local government elections. The election used four district electoral areas to elect a total of 23 councillors.

== Election results ==
Ards Borough Council Election Result 1997
Party	Seats	Gains	Losses	Net gain/loss	Seats %	Votes %	Votes	+/−
UUP	10	1	0	▲1	43.5	39.6	7,754	▲4.9
DUP	5	1	2	▼1	21.7	22.6	4,431	▼5.7
Alliance	5	0	1	▼1	21.7	21.1	4,138	▼2.3
Ind. Unionist	2	1	0	▲1	8.7	6.3	1,240	▲0.4
SDLP	1	1	0	▲1	4.3	3.9	901	New
Independent	0	0	1	▼1	0.0	1.6	337	▼1.8
PUP	0	0	0	0	0.0	2.3	441	▲2.3
UK Unionist	0	0	0	0	0.0	1.4	269	New
Ulster Democratic	0	0	0	0	0.0	0.3	55	New
Green (NI)	0	0	0	0	0.0	0.2	33	New

Note: "Votes" are the first preference votes.

== Districts summary ==
Results of the Ards Borough Council election, 1997 by district
Ward	%	Cllrs	%	Cllrs	%	Cllrs	%	Cllrs	%	Cllrs	Total Cllrs
Ward	UUP		DUP		Alliance		SDLP		Others		Total Cllrs
Ards East	52.1	4	23.0	1	15.3	1	0.0	0	9.6	0	6
Ards West	56.1	3	18.8	1	25.1	2	0.0	0	0.0	0	6
Newtownards	26.6	2	18.6	1	15.4	1	0.0	0	39.4	2	6
Peninsula	22.6	1	29.7	2	28.8	1	18.2	1	0.7	0	5
Total	39.6	10	22.6	5	21.1	5	4.6	1	12.1	0	23

== Districts results ==
=== Ards East ===
1993: 3 x UUP, 2 x DUP, 1 x Alliance
1997: 4 x UUP, 1 x DUP, 1 x Alliance
1993-1997 Change: UUP gain from DUP

Ards East - 6 seats
Party	Candidate	FPv%	Count							
Party	Candidate	FPv%	1	2	3	4	5	6	7	8
UUP	Thomas Benson*	17.40%	882							
UUP	Ronald Ferguson*	13.33%	676	762.4						
DUP	Hamilton Gregory	12.25%	621	628.2	629.53	656.71	811.71			
UUP	John Shields*	11.95%	606	618.24	622.44	656.62	668.05	668.64	752.64	
Alliance	Linda Cleland	8.24%	418	422.32	422.53	437.71	441.71	442.89	462.07	792.07
UUP	Jeffrey Magill*	9.47%	480	508.98	533.69	582.23	616.56	621.87	680.76	694.05
DUP	St Clair McAlister*	5.82%	295	299.32	299.95	309.95	369.2	447.67	509.28	518.64
Alliance	Laurence Thompson*	6.94%	352	355.06	355.48	363.48	363.48	363.48	378.66	
UK Unionist	Thomas Sheridan	5.31%	269	271.16	271.93	283.93	287.93	287.93		
DUP	Hamilton Lawther	4.95%	251	254.96	255.87	274.87				
PUP	Georgina McCrory	4.34%	220	221.26	221.33					
Electorate: 14,904 Valid: 5,070 (34.02%) Spoilt: 114 Quota: 725 Turnout: 5,184 (34.78%)

=== Ards West ===
1993: 3 x UUP, 2 x Alliance, 1 x DUP
1997: 3 x UUP, 2 x Alliance, 1 x DUP
1993-1997 Change: No change

Ards West - 6 seats
Party	Candidate	FPv%	Count					
Party	Candidate	FPv%	1	2	3	4	5	6
UUP	Robert Gibson*	22.59%	1,103					
UUP	David McNarry	21.83%	1,066					
Alliance	Kathleen Coulter*	15.18%	741					
UUP	Margaret Craig*	11.71%	572	871.52				
DUP	David Gilmore	13.00%	635	683.75	877.19			
Alliance	Jim McBriar*	9.85%	481	511.03	595.27	599.43	654.81	693.81
DUP	Lorraine Gilmore	5.84%	285	311.13	398.49	552.93	649.26	650.58
Electorate: 12,917 Valid: 4,883 (37.80%) Spoilt: 70 Quota: 698 Turnout: 4,953 (38.34%)

=== Newtownards ===
1993: 2 x UUP, 2 x DUP, 1 x Alliance, 1 x Independent Unionist
1997: 2 x DUP, 2 x Independent Unionist, 1 x DUP, 1 x Alliance
1993-1997 Change: Independent Unionist gain from DUP

Newtownards - 6 seats
Party	Candidate	FPv%	Count								
Party	Candidate	FPv%	1	2	3	4	5	6	7	8	9
Ind. Unionist	Wilbert Magill*	19.41%	914								
Alliance	Alan McDowell*	15.37%	724								
UUP	David Smyth*	14.65%	690								
DUP	George Ennis*	10.89%	653	692.44							
UUP	Thomas Hamilton*	12.00%	565	628.22	635.8	651.6	656.36	666.68	728.68		
Ind. Unionist	Bobby McBride	6.92%	326	377.33	382.33	388.83	391.38	391.78	426.07	507.6	534.6
Ind. Unionist	Nancy Orr*	7.15%	337	393.26	407.42	430.62	433.68	434.68	461.61	503.67	510.67
DUP	John Purdy	4.78%	225	238.63	245.08	246.28	253.76	254.62	305.39		
PUP	Alfred McCrory	4.69%	221	231.15	245.15	249.45	250.47	250.73			
Ulster Democratic	Billy McKeown	1.17%	55	59.93							
Electorate: 12,942 Valid: 4,710 (36.39%) Spoilt: 120 Quota: 673 Turnout: 4,830 (37.32%)

=== Peninsula ===
1993: 2 x Alliance, 1 x DUP, 1 x UUP, 1 x Independent
1997: 2 x DUP, 1 x UUP, 1 x Alliance, 1 x SDLP
1997-2001 Change: DUP and SDLP gain from Alliance and Independent

Peninsula - 5 seats
Party	Candidate	FPv%	Count				
Party	Candidate	FPv%	1	2	3	4	5
UUP	Paul Carson	22.57%	1,114				
Alliance	Kieran McCarthy*	21.21%	1,047				
DUP	Jim Shannon*	20.12%	993				
DUP	Robert Drysdale	10.25%	473	687.21	696.01	849.01	
SDLP	Daniel McCarthy	15.60%	770	777.44	808.9	810.52	930.52
Alliance	William Sheldon*	3.12%	154	202.98	315.62	325.16	346.72
Alliance	John Smyth	4.48%	221	227.82	279.3	281.82	296.02
SDLP	Iain Bell	2.65%	131	131	141.12	141.48	
Green (NI)	Owen Crawford	0.67%	33	40.75	44.49	45.75	
Electorate: 11,165 Valid: 4,936 (44.21%) Spoilt: 101 Quota: 824 Turnout: 5,037 (45.11%)
