= 1993 Ards Borough Council election =

Local government election in Northern Ireland

- 19 May 1993

All 23 seats to Ards Borough Council 12 seats needed for a majority
	First party	Second party	Third party
Party	UUP	DUP	Alliance
Seats won	9	6	6
Seat change	▲1	▼1	▲2
	Fourth party	Fifth party
Party	Independent	Ind. Unionist
Seats won	1	1
Seat change	▲1	0
- Party with the most votes by district.

Elections to Ards Borough Council were held on 19 May 1993 on the same day as the other Northern Irish local government elections. The election used four district electoral areas to elect a total of 23 councillors.

== Election results ==
Ards Borough Council Election Result 1993
Party	Seats	Gains	Losses	Net gain/loss	Seats %	Votes %	Votes	+/−
UUP	9	1	0	▲1	39.1	34.7	6,683	▼6.6
DUP	6	0	1	▼1	26.1	28.3	5,438	▼3.0
Alliance	6	2	0	▲2	26.1	23.4	4,501	▲4.6
Ind. Unionist	1	1	1	0	0.0	5.9	1,138	▲1.2
Independent	1	1	0	▲1	4.3	3.4	656	▲0.5
NI Conservatives	0	0	0	0	0.0	4.3	819	New

Note: "Votes" are the first preference votes.

== Districts summary ==
Results of the Ards Borough Council election, 1993 by district
Ward	%	Cllrs	%	Cllrs	%	Cllrs	%	Cllrs	Total Cllrs
Ward	UUP		DUP		Alliance		Others		Total Cllrs
Ards East	45.7	3	31.7	2	15.0	1	7.6	0	6
Ards West	44.7	3	24.4	1	25.0	2	5.9	0	6
Newtownards	27.4	2	28.2	2	16.5	1	27.9	1	6
Peninsula	20.4	1	28.9	1	36.9	2	13.8	1	5
Total	34.7	9	28.3	6	23.4	6	13.6	2	23

== Districts results ==
=== Ards East ===
1993: 3 x UUP, 2 x DUP, 1 x Alliance

Ards East - 6 seats
Party	Candidate	FPv%	Count		
Party	Candidate	FPv%	1	2	3
UUP	Thomas Benson*	19.85%	956		
DUP	Jeffrey Magill	17.99%	866		
UUP	John Shields*	15.39%	741		
Alliance	Laurence Thompson	14.97%	721		
UUP	Ronald Ferguson	10.49%	505	730.3	
DUP	St Clair McAlister	13.73%	661	686.2	851.8
NI Conservatives	Gavin Walker	7.58%	365	382.1	389.46
Electorate: 13,490 Valid: 4,815 (35.69%) Spoilt: 120 Quota: 688 Turnout: 4,935 (36.58%)

=== Ards West ===
1993: 3 x UUP, 2 x Alliance, 1 x DUP

Ards West - 6 seats
Party	Candidate	FPv%	Count			
Party	Candidate	FPv%	1	2	3	4
UUP	Robert Gibson*	26.41%	1,318			
DUP	Simpson Gibson*	14.75%	736			
UUP	Margaret Craig	12.92%	645	906.6		
Alliance	Jim McBriar*	12.70%	634	671.44	684.15	750.15
Alliance	Kathleen Coulter	12.34%	616	628.48	637.91	712.68
UUP	Stanley McCoy	5.39%	269	472.52	604.13	674.94
DUP	Richard Finlay	9.64%	481	542.44	571.55	611.56
NI Conservatives	Robert Darnley	5.85%	292	307.84	315.22	
Electorate: 12,414 Valid: 4,991 (40.20%) Spoilt: 118 Quota: 714 Turnout: 5,109 (41.16%)

=== Newtownards ===
1993: 2 x UUP, 2 x DUP, 1 x Alliance, 1 x Independent Unionist

Newtownards - 6 seats
Party	Candidate	FPv%	Count			
Party	Candidate	FPv%	1	2	3	4
UUP	David Smyth*	17.55%	817			
Alliance	Alan McDowell	16.49%	768			
Ind. Unionist	Nancy Orr	13.70%	638	645.56	695.56	
UUP	Thomas Hamilton	9.84%	458	551.24	631.1	677.79
DUP	Wilbert Magill*	11.90%	554	567.32	657.3	663.51
DUP	George Ennis	11.71%	545	549.32	634.22	638.59
UUP	Bobby McBride*	10.74%	500	513.68	546.02	588.34
DUP	John Purdy	4.60%	214	217.24		
NI Conservatives	Andrew Thompson	3.48%	162	171		
Electorate: 12,647 Valid: 4,656 (36.82%) Spoilt: 141 Quota: 666 Turnout: 4,797 (37.93%)

=== Peninsula ===
1993: 2 x Alliance, 1 x DUP, 1 x UUP, 1 x Independent

Peninsula - 5 seats
Party	Candidate	FPv%	Count			
Party	Candidate	FPv%	1	2	3	4
Alliance	Kieran McCarthy*	32.39%	1,546			
DUP	Jim Shannon*	18.77%	896			
Independent	James McMullan	13.74%	656	818.76		
UUP	Robert Ambrose*	14.94%	713	758.24	943.24	
Alliance	William Sheldon	4.53%	216	723	743.28	770.28
DUP	Thomas Cully	10.16%	485	498	539.08	599.08
UUP	Samuel Brown	5.47%	261	275.56		
Electorate: 10,416 Valid: 4,773 (45.82%) Spoilt: 158 Quota: 796 Turnout: 4,931 (47.34%)
