= 2001 Ards Borough Council election =

Local government election in Northern Ireland

- 7 June 2001

All 23 seats to Ards Borough Council 12 seats needed for a majority
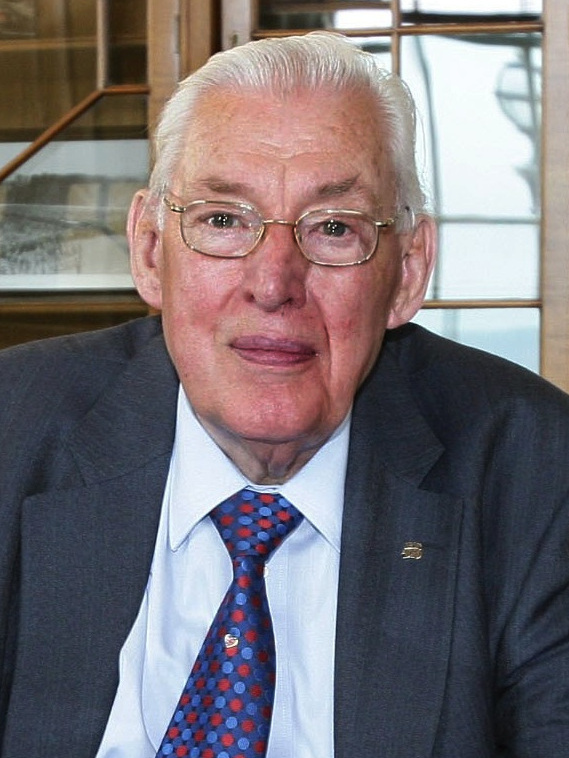

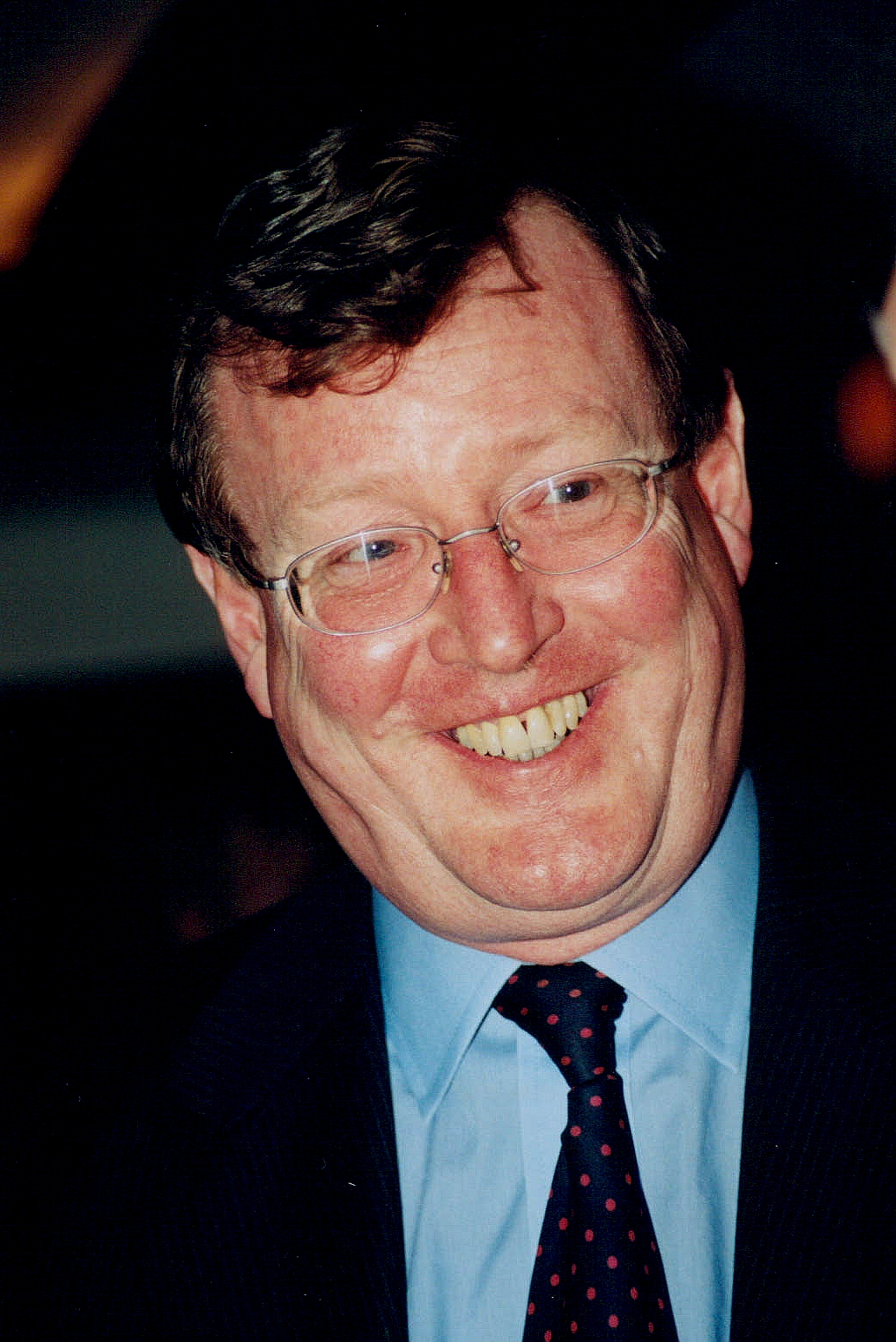

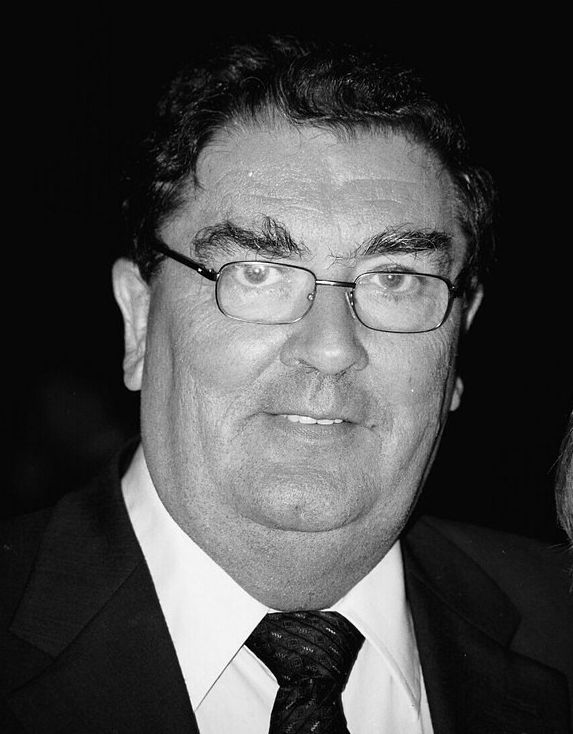

	First party	Second party	Third party
Leader	Ian Paisley	David Trimble	Seán Neeson
Party	DUP	UUP	Alliance
Seats won	9	8	4
Seat change	▲4	▼2	▼1
Percentage	37.0%	31.7%	16.7%
Swing	▲14.4%	▼7.9%	▼4.4%
	Fourth party	Fifth party	Sixth party
Leader	John Hume	N/A
Party	SDLP	Independent	Ind. Unionist
Seats won	1	1	0
Seat change	0	▲1	▼2
Percentage	3.9%	9.8%
Swing	▼0.7%	▲8.2%
- 2001 Ards Borough Council Election Results, shaded by plurality of First Preference Votes.

Elections to Ards Borough Council were held on 7 June 2001 on the same day as the other Northern Irish local government elections. The election used four district electoral areas to elect a total of 23 councillors.

== Election results ==
Ards Borough Council Election Result 2001
Party	Seats	Gains	Losses	Net gain/loss	Seats %	Votes %	Votes	+/−
DUP	9	4	0	▲4	39.1	37.0	8,133	▲14.4
UUP	8	0	2	▼2	34.8	31.7	6,968	▼7.9
Alliance	4	0	1	▼1	17.4	16.7	3,668	▼4.4
Independent	1	1	0	▲1	4.3	9.8	2,135	▲8.2
SDLP	1	0	0	0	4.3	3.9	860	▼0.7
NI Conservatives	0	0	0	0	0.0	0.9	190	▲0.9

Note: "Votes" are the first preference votes.

== Districts summary ==
Results of the Ards Borough Council election, 2001 by district
Ward	%	Cllrs	%	Cllrs	%	Cllrs	%	Cllrs	%	Cllrs	Total Cllrs
Ward	DUP		UUP		Alliance		SDLP		Others		Total Cllrs
Ards East	N/A	2	N/A	3	N/A	1	N/A	0	N/A	0	6
Ards West	36.9	3	42.2	2	18.5	1	0.0	0	2.4	0	6
Newtownards	37.5	2	33.3	2	12.2	1	0.0	0	17.0	0	6
Peninsula	36.8	2	17.9	1	19.2	1	12.5	1	13.6	0	5
Total	37.0	9	31.7	8	16.7	4	3.9	1	10.7	0	23

== Districts results ==
=== Ards East ===
1997: 4 x UUP, 1 x UUP, 1 x Alliance
2001: 3 x DUP, 2 x DUP, 1 x Alliance
1997-2001 Change: DUP gain from UUP

Ards East - 6 seats
Party	Candidate	FPv%	Count
Party	Candidate	FPv%	1
Alliance	Linda Cleland*	N/A	N/A
UUP	Ronald Ferguson*	N/A	N/A
DUP	Hamilton Gregory*	N/A	N/A
UUP	Jeffrey Magill*	N/A	N/A
UUP	John Shields*	N/A	N/A
DUP	Terence Williams	N/A	N/A
Electorate: N/A Valid: N/A Spoilt: N/A Quota: N/A Turnout: N/A

- As only six candidates had been nominated for six seats, there was no vote in Ards East and all six candidates were deemed elected.

=== Ards West ===
1997: 3 x UUP, 2 x Alliance, 1 x DUP
2001: 3 x DUP, 2 x UUP, 1 x Alliance
1997-2001 Change: DUP (two seats) gain from UUP and Alliance

Ards West - 6 seats
Party	Candidate	FPv%	Count					
Party	Candidate	FPv%	1	2	3	4	5	6
UUP	Robert Gibson*	30.56%	2,454					
DUP	Margaret Craig*	15.32%	1,230					
UUP	Philip Smith	7.78%	625	1,516.55				
DUP	William Montgomery	12.94%	1,039	1,098.95	1,100.56	1,117.89	1,124.49	1,175.49
Alliance	Jim McBriar*	9.41%	756	835.75	840.35	866.23	867.07	1,023.47
DUP	David Gilmore*	8.63%	693	789.25	794.08	810.63	873.15	1,001.09
Alliance	Kathleen Coulter*	9.12%	732	791.4	795.08	842.96	843.92	965.11
UUP	Arthur Spence	3.87%	311	412.75	762.35	829.73	830.93	
NI Conservatives	Christopher Connolly	2.37%	190	205.4	207.01			
Electorate: 13,602 Valid: 8,030 (59.04%) Spoilt: 223 Quota: 1,148 Turnout: 8,253 (60.67%)

=== Newtownards ===
1997: 2 x UUP, 2 x Independent Unionist, 1 x DUP, 1 x Alliance
2001: 2 x DUP, 2 x UUP, 1 x Alliance, 1 x Independent Unionist
1997-2001 Change: DUP gain from Independent Unionist, Independent Unionist becomes Independent

Newtownards - 6 seats
Party	Candidate	FPv%	Count				
Party	Candidate	FPv%	1	2	3	4	5
DUP	George Ennis*	22.81%	1,608				
UUP	Thomas Hamilton*	18.27%	1,288				
UUP	David Smyth*	15.04%	1,060				
Independent	Wilbert Magill*	12.61%	889	923.2	1,043.2		
Alliance	Alan McDowell*	12.18%	859	863.94	915.32	1,075.9	
DUP	Hamilton Lawther	5.15%	363	838	877.14	944.41	967.66
DUP	Bobby McBride*	9.52%	671	734.46	779.5	830.96	852.04
Independent	Nancy Orr	4.43%	312	322.66			
Electorate: 12,965 Valid: 7,050 (54.38%) Spoilt: 218 Quota: 1,008 Turnout: 7,268 (56.06%)

=== Peninsula ===
1997: 2 x DUP, 1 x UUP, 1 x Alliance, 1 x SDLP
2001: 2 x DUP, 1 x UUP, 1 x Alliance, 1 x SDLP
1997-2001 Change: No change

Peninsula - 5 seats
Party	Candidate	FPv%	Count							
Party	Candidate	FPv%	1	2	3	4	5	6	7	8
DUP	Jim Shannon*	26.53%	1,824							
Alliance	Kieran McCarthy*	18.71%	1,286							
DUP	Robert Drysdale*	10.25%	705	1,222.92						
SDLP	Daniel McCarthy*	12.51%	860	865.85	899.51	918.84	1,025.08	1,025.88	1,430.88	
UUP	Angus Carson	10.33%	710	748.22	755.81	766.28	864.5	894.8	944.8	1,008.8
UUP	Paul Carson*	7.56%	520	583.96	593.97	603.82	671.15	710.75	731.42	765.42
Independent	Joe Boyle	7.65%	526	528.73	543.58	553.75	646.87	648.67		
Independent	Robert Ambrose	3.71%	255	289.32	298.01	307.13				
Independent	James McMullan	2.23%	153	155.73	162.99	166.58				
Alliance	Stephen McSherry	0.51%	35	38.12	85.2					
Electorate: 11,849 Valid: 6,874 (58.01%) Spoilt: 211 Quota: 1,146 Turnout: 7,085 (59.79%)
