= 2011 Ards Borough Council election =

Local government election in Northern Ireland

- 5 May 2011

All 23 seats to Ards Borough Council 12 seats needed for a majority
	First party	Second party	Third party
Party	DUP	UUP	Alliance
Seats won	11	6	4
Seat change	▼1	▼1	▲1
	Fourth party	Fifth party
Party	SDLP	Independent
Seats won	1	1
Seat change	Steady	▲1
- Party with the most votes by district.

Elections to Ards Borough Council were held on 5 May 2011 on the same day as the other Northern Irish local government elections. The election used four district electoral areas to elect a total of 23 councillors.

== Election results ==
Ards Borough Council Election Result 2011
Party	Seats	Gains	Losses	Net gain/loss	Seats %	Votes %	Votes	+/−
DUP	11	0	1	▼1	47.8	47.4	11,732	▼5.0
UUP	6	0	1	▼1	26.1	17.5	4,337	▼7.0
Alliance	4	1	0	▲1	17.4	18.2	4,512	▲4.1
SDLP	1	0	0	Steady	4.3	6.8	1,685	▲3.4
Independent	1	1	0	▲1	4.3	5.4	1,328	▲1.6
TUV	0	0	0	Steady	0.0	3.4	830	New
Green (NI)	0	0	0	Steady	0.0	0.8	191	▲0.1
NI Conservatives	0	0	0	Steady	0.0	0.5	129	▲0.5

Note: "Votes" are the first preference votes.

== Districts summary ==
Results of the Ards Borough Council election, 2011 by district
Ward	%	Cllrs	%	Cllrs	%	Cllrs	%	Cllrs	%	Cllrs	Total Cllrs
Ward	DUP		UUP		Alliance		SDLP		Others		Total Cllrs
Ards East	57.6	4	17.0	1	16.2	1	1.8	0	7.4	0	6
Ards West	52.4	3	20.6	2	19.8	1	0.0	0	7.2	0	6
Newtownards	40.9	2	20.9	2	16.5	1	1.7	0	20.0	1	6
Peninsula	36.4	2	11.8	1	20.2	1	24.2	1	7.4	0	5
Total	47.4	11	17.5	6	18.2	4	6.8	1	10.1	1	23

== Districts results ==
=== Ards East ===
2005: 4 x DUP, 2 x UUP
2011: 4 x DUP, 1 x UUP, 1 x Alliance
2005-2011 Change: Alliance gain from UUP

Ards East - 6 seats
Party	Candidate	FPv%	Count							
Party	Candidate	FPv%	1	2	3	4	5	6	7	8
DUP	Colville Elliott*	20.05%	1,353							
Alliance	Linda Cleland	16.21%	1,094							
DUP	Hamilton Gregory*	14.11%	952	1,168.92						
DUP	Tom Smith	14.26%	962	1,082.93						
DUP	Eddie Thompson	9.19%	620	633.92	818.94	831.12	946.25	953.67	978.67	
UUP	Ronald Ferguson*	9.23%	623	632.57	636.34	649.64	649.93	654.91	675.39	765.23
UUP	Katherine Ferguson	7.78%	525	540.95	543.85	572.69	572.98	580.36	620.45	694.57
TUV	Terence Williams*	4.51%	304	306.61	310.38	318.22	318.8	321.08	347	
Green (NI)	Emer Hopkins	2.83%	191	193.03	193.9	236.18	236.18	311.26		
SDLP	Moira Ritchie	1.82%	123	123.87	125.61	147.45	147.74			
Electorate: 16,004 Valid: 6,747 (42.16%) Spoilt: 165 Quota: 965 Turnout: 6,912 (43.19%)

=== Ards West ===
2005: 3 x DUP, 2 x UUP, 1 x Alliance
2011: 3 x DUP, 2 x UUP, 1 x Alliance
2005-2011 Change: No change

Ards West - 6 seats
Party	Candidate	FPv%	Count					
Party	Candidate	FPv%	1	2	3	4	5	6
DUP	Robert Gibson*	23.10%	1,519					
DUP	Trevor Cummings	16.13%	1,061					
DUP	Mervyn Oswald*	13.20%	868	1,300.12				
UUP	James Fletcher*	13.40%	881	929.75	1,063.31			
UUP	Philip Smith	7.16%	471	497.91	615.72	663.56	767.51	935.53
Alliance	Deborah Girvan	11.60%	763	775.87	804.22	832.61	833.24	872.75
Alliance	Jim McBriar*	8.24%	542	572.03	600.38	619.77	623.55	661.78
TUV	Jack Allister	5.22%	343	358.21	400.42	412.81	414.07	
NI Conservatives	Bill McKendry	1.96%	129	133.68	138.72			
Electorate: 13,199 Valid: 6,577 (49.83%) Spoilt: 115 Quota: 941 Turnout: 6,692 (50.70%)

=== Newtownards ===
2005: 3 x DUP, 2 x UUP, 1 x Alliance
2011: 2 x DUP, 2 x UUP, 1 x Alliance, 1 x Independent
2005-2011 Change: Independent gain from DUP

Newtownards - 6 seats
Party	Candidate	FPv%	Count			
Party	Candidate	FPv%	1	2	3	4
DUP	Naomi Armstrong	18.31%	979			
Alliance	Alan McDowell*	16.51%	883			
DUP	Stephen McIlveen	14.72%	787			
Independent	Jimmy Menagh	14.29%	764	772.14		
UUP	Thomas Hamilton*	10.45%	559	573.96	671.06	713.78
UUP	David Smyth*	10.53%	563	567.84	654.94	711.1
DUP	Charlie Simmons	7.82%	418	589.16	639.24	657.96
TUV	Hamilton Lawther	3.42%	183	186.96		
Independent	Ken Richardson	2.30%	123	124.54		
SDLP	Gerard Lennon	1.66%	89	90.32		
Electorate: 12,092 Valid: 5,348 (44.23%) Spoilt: 119 Quota: 765 Turnout: 5,467 (45.21%)

=== Peninsula ===
2005: 2 x DUP, 1 x SDLP, 1 x Alliance, 1 x UUP
2011: 2 x DUP, 1 x SDLP, 1 x Alliance, 1 x UUP
2005-2011 Change: No change

Peninsula - 5 seats
Party	Candidate	FPv%	Count					
Party	Candidate	FPv%	1	2	3	4	5	6
SDLP	Joe Boyle*	24.24%	1,473					
DUP	Robert Adair	17.56%	1,067					
Alliance	Kieran McCarthy*	15.50%	942	1,271.3				
DUP	Colin Kennedy	11.95%	726	728.59	732.37	770.53	823.53	1,140.53
UUP	Angus Carson*	11.83%	719	731.21	746.33	803.28	879.02	954.44
Alliance	Kellie Armstrong	4.74%	288	366.44	568.04	587.31	628.05	646.74
DUP	John Prentice	6.91%	420	423.33	429.21	442.58	507.79	
Independent	Joe Hagan	4.30%	261	269.14	280.48	314.22		
Independent	Robert Drysdale*	2.96%	180	197.76	215.4			
Electorate: 12,879 Valid: 6,076 (47.18%) Spoilt: 132 Quota: 1,014 Turnout: 6,208 (48.20%)
