= St Clair McAlister =

Politician from Northern Ireland

Member of Ards Borough Council
- In office 19 May 1993 – 21 May 1997
- Preceded by: District created
- Succeeded by: Hamilton Gregory
- Constituency: Ards East

Member of the Northern Ireland Forum for North Down
- In office 30 May 1996 – 25 April 1998

Personal details
- Political party: Democratic Unionist Party

St Clair McAlister is a former Democratic Unionist Party (DUP) politician in Northern Ireland.

== Career ==
McAlister was elected to the Northern Ireland Forum in 1996 as a Democratic Unionist Party (DUP) representative for North Down. He failed to be elected to Ards Borough Council in 1997, and lost his seat at the 1998 Northern Ireland Assembly election.

McAlister was later appointed as the DUP's Director of Communications, then wrote a weekly opinion column for the Belfast Newsletter. An architect by profession, McAlister has since retired from politics entirely, returning to business and private pursuits.

Northern Ireland Forum
New forum	Member for North Down; 1996–1998	Forum dissolved
