= Michelle McIlveen =

Northern Irish politician (born 1971)

Michelle McIlveen MLA
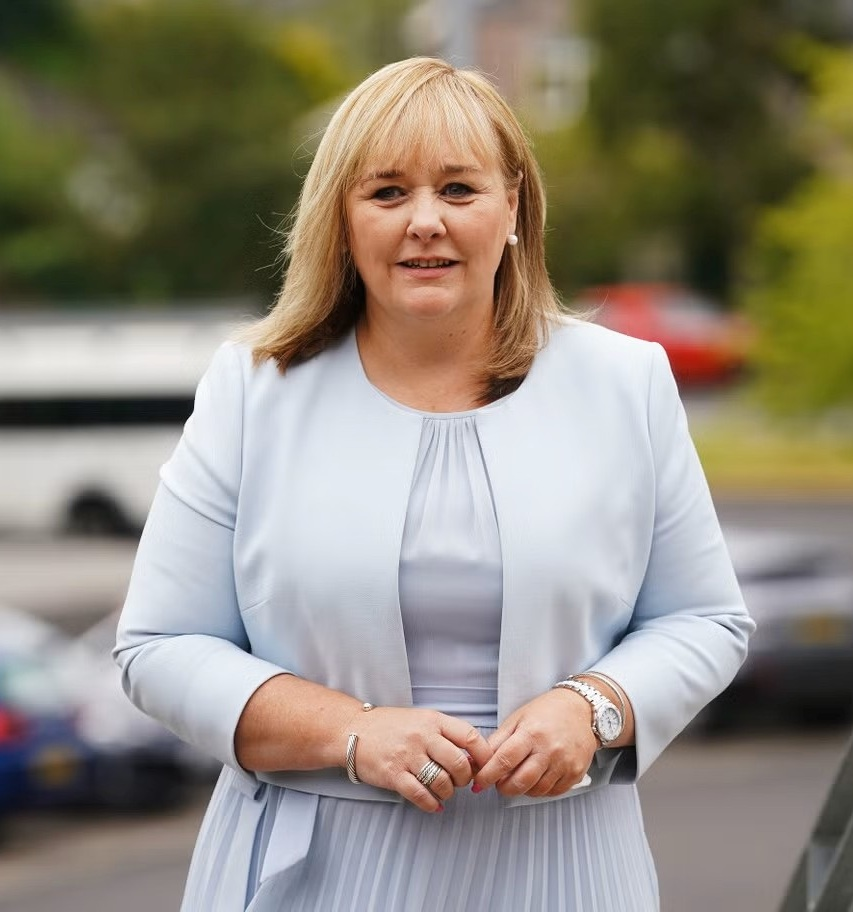
- McIlveen in 2025

Deputy Leader of the Democratic Unionist Party
- Incumbent
- Assumed office 7 March 2025
- Leader: Gavin Robinson
- Preceded by: Gavin Robinson (2024)

Minister for Education
- In office 14 June 2021 – 27 October 2022
- Preceded by: Peter Weir
- Succeeded by: Paul Givan (2024)

Minister of Agriculture, Environment, and Rural Affairs
- In office 6 May 2016 – 26 January 2017
- Preceded by: Michelle O'Neill
- Succeeded by: Edwin Poots

Minister for Regional Development
- In office 21 September 2015 (Note: Resigned on 21 September 2015, re-entered office on 23 Sept. till 24 Sept., then 30 Sept.-1 Oct. 2015. Following 20 October she permanently occupies the office) – 6 May 2016
- Preceded by: Danny Kennedy
- Succeeded by: Chris Hazzard

Junior Minister at the Office of the First Minister and Deputy First Minister
- In office 11 May 2015 – 28 October 2015 Serving with Jennifer McCann
- Preceded by: Jonathan Bell
- Succeeded by: Emma Little-Pengelly

Member of the Legislative Assembly for Strangford
- Incumbent
- Assumed office 7 March 2007
- Preceded by: John Taylor

Member of the Ards Borough Council
- In office 5 May 2005 – 5 May 2011
- Preceded by: Wilbert Magill
- Succeeded by: Stephen McIlveen (brother)
- Constituency: Newtownards

Personal details
- Born: 21 January 1971 (age 55) Newtownards, Northern Ireland
- Party: Democratic Unionist Party
- Education: Queen's University, Belfast
- Profession: Politician
- Cabinet: Deputy Leader
- Committees: Agriculture, Environment and Rural Affairs
- Website: Official website

Michelle McIlveen MLA (born 21 January 1971) is a Northern Irish unionist politician, serving as Deputy Leader of the Democratic Unionist Party (DUP) since 2025 She has been a Member of the Legislative Assembly (MLA) for Strangford since 2007. She is also the party's Spokesperson for Environment, Climate and Fisheries. McIlveen served as the Secretary of the DUP from 2008 until 2025. She has held a number of ministerial posts, most recently the Minister for Education from June 2021 to October 2022.

== Early life and education ==
A native of Newtownards, she attended Methodist College Belfast and later Queen's University, Belfast where she took a master's degree in Irish Politics and later still a Postgraduate Certificate in Education, the necessary qualification to teach in most parts of the United Kingdom.

She taught History and Politics at Grosvenor Grammar School in East Belfast for a number of years before entering full-time politics. She also worked in her father's car dealership in Newtownards.

== Political career ==
McIlveen was first elected as a councillor to Ards Borough Council in 2005, representing the Newtownards District. She then became an MLA in the 2007 Assembly election for Strangford. In 2008, she became the DUP's secretary under the leadership of Peter Robinson.

McIlveen became the Junior Minister in the Office of the First Minister and Deputy First Minister on 11 May 2015 until 28 October 2015.

She became the Minister for Regional Development on 21 September 2015. This post had been held by the Ulster Unionist Party (UUP) minister Danny Kennedy until his party withdrew from the Northern Ireland Executive, and under the D'Hondt method the department was transferred to the DUP. McIlveen was appointed as minister for this department, with Emma Little-Pengelly replacing her as Junior Minister.

McIlveen then served as the Minister of Agriculture, Environment, and Rural Affairs from 2016 until the collapse of the Northern Ireland Executive in January 2017.

She represents a "centre ground" group of DUP MLAs and her support was critical in helping Edwin Poots win the May 2021 Democratic Unionist Party leadership election.

On 14 June 2021, McIlveen, a former teacher, was appointed as the Minister for Education by Poots. During her tenure she most notably enacted the School Age Bill, allowing flexibility around the primary school starting age. She remained in the post under Sir Jeffrey Donaldson's leadership. However, Donaldson unsuccessfully plotted to remove McIlveen as a party officer.

Her constituency office is in Comber.

=== Deputy Leader of the Democratic Unionist Party (2025–present) ===
McIlveen became deputy leader of the DUP following the 2025 deputy leadership election in which she was elected unopposed. She was seen by the leadership as a “safe pair of hands” who would help keep the party united.

In July 2025, McIlveen remarked that the Orange Order and unionists in general have been on the receiving end of "a sustained and deeply unfair campaign" in the media.

== Notes ==
Northern Ireland Assembly
| Preceded by John Taylor, Baron Kilclooney | MLA for Strangford; 2007–present | Incumbent |
Party political offices
| Preceded by Nigel Dodds | Secretary of the Democratic Unionist Party; 2008–2025 | Succeeded by Paul Frew |
| Preceded by Gavin Robinson (2024) | Deputy Leader of the Democratic Unionist Party; 2025–present | Incumbent |
Political offices
| Preceded by Jonathan Bell | Junior Minister; 2015 | Succeeded by Emma Pengelly |
| Preceded by Danny Kennedy | Minister for Regional Development; 2015–2016 | Succeeded by Chris Hazzard as Minister for Infrastructure |
| Preceded by Michelle O'Neill | Minister of Agriculture, Environment and Rural Affairs; 2016–2017 | Vacant Office suspended Title next held by Edwin Poots |
| Preceded by Peter Weir | Minister for Education; 2021–2022 | Vacant Office suspended Title next held by Paul Givan |
