= Simon Hamilton =

British politician (born 1977)

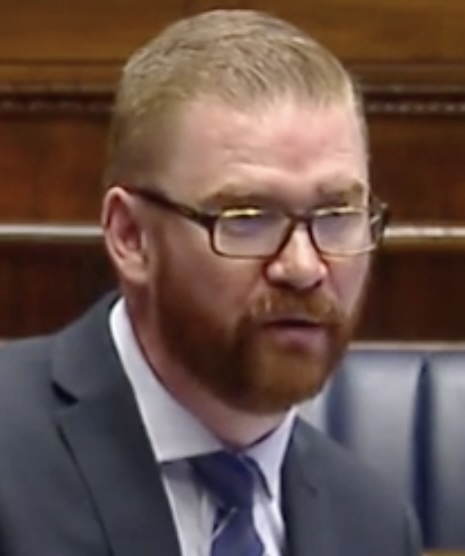

Economy Minister of Northern Ireland
- In office 25 May 2016 – 26 January 2017
- First Minister: Arlene Foster
- Preceded by: Jonathan Bell
- Succeeded by: Diane Dodds (2020)

Minister of Health, Social Services and Public Safety
- In office 11 May 2015 – 6 May 2016
- Preceded by: Jim Wells
- Succeeded by: Michelle O'Neill

Minister of Finance and Personnel
- In office 29 July 2013 – 11 May 2015
- Preceded by: Sammy Wilson
- Succeeded by: Arlene Foster

Member of the Legislative Assembly for Strangford
- In office 7 March 2007 – 2 September 2019
- Preceded by: George Ennis
- Succeeded by: Harry Harvey

Member of Ards Borough Council
- In office 5 May 2005 – 5 May 2011
- Preceded by: Hamilton Lawther
- Succeeded by: Naomi Armstrong
- Constituency: Newtownards

Personal details
- Born: 17 March 1977 (age 49) Newtownards, Northern Ireland
- Party: Democratic Unionist Party (until 2019)
- Spouse: Nicki
- Children: Lewis; Kyle
- Education: Queen's University Belfast
- Website: Official website

Simon Hamilton (born 17 March 1977) is a Northern Irish businessman, consultant and former Democratic Unionist Party (DUP) politician. Hamilton served as the Economy Minister in the Northern Ireland Executive from 2016, until its collapse in January 2017. He was a Member of the Legislative Assembly (MLA) for Strangford from 2007 to 2019.

== Education ==
Hamilton was educated at Regent House School and Queen's University, Belfast holding degrees in history/politics and law. He served as Chairman of the Queen's Unionist Association and as a member of Queen's University Senate.

== Career ==
Hamilton began his career as an auditor with an accountancy firm in Belfast and was employed as a DUP Policy Officer in their Party Headquarters from 2003 until his election to the Northern Ireland Assembly in 2007. He was elected to Ards Borough Council in 2005 but did not stand at the 2011 Election. Hamilton was secretary of Strangford DUP Association and vice-chairman of Newtownards DUP Branch.

He was appointed minister of finance and personnel and replaced Sammy Wilson on 29 June 2013 in a reshuffle.

He was later appointed as the Health Minister of Northern Ireland in a further DUP reshuffle on 11 May 2015. He resigned from this post several times during September and October 2015 in the context of a political crisis at Stormont.

In June 2019, Hamilton announced he was standing down from front line politics to become CEO of Belfast Chamber of Commerce. He also resigned from the DUP to take this role.

Northern Ireland Assembly
| Preceded by George Ennis | MLA for Strangford; 2007–2019 | Succeeded by Harry Harvey |
Political offices
| Preceded by Sammy Wilson | Minister of Finance and Personnel; 2013–2015 | Succeeded by Arlene Foster |
| Preceded by Jim Wells | Minister of Health, Social Services and Public Safety; 2015 – 2016 | Succeeded by Michelle O'Neill as Minister of Health |
| Preceded by Jonathan Bell | Minister for the Economy; 2016 – 2017 | Vacant Office suspended |
