= Jonathan Bell (politician) =

Politician from Northern Ireland

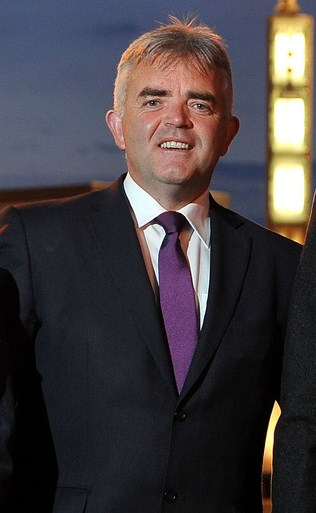

Minister of Enterprise, Trade and Investment
- In office 11 May 2015 (Note: Resigned on 10 September 2015, re-entered office on 16 Sept. till 17 Sept., then 23 Sept.-24 Sept, 28 Sept.-29 Sept., 30 Sept.-1 Oct. 2015. From 20 October assumed the office) – 5 May 2016
- Preceded by: Arlene Foster
- Succeeded by: Simon Hamilton

Junior Minister at the Office of the First Minister and Deputy First Minister
- In office 16 May 2011 – 11 May 2015
- Preceded by: Robin Newton
- Succeeded by: Michelle McIlveen

Member of the Legislative Assembly for Strangford
- In office 22 January 2010 – 26 January 2017
- Preceded by: Iris Robinson
- Succeeded by: Peter Weir

Member of Ards Borough Council
- In office 5 May 2005 – 5 May 2011
- Preceded by: Linda Cleland
- Succeeded by: Tom Smith
- Constituency: Ards East

Mayor of Craigavon
- In office 2002–2003
- Preceded by: Sam Gardiner
- Succeeded by: Ignatius Fox

Member of Craigavon Borough Council
- In office 21 May 1997 – 5 May 2005
- Preceded by: Donald Mackay
- Succeeded by: Mark Russell
- Constituency: Lurgan

Personal details
- Born: Jonathan Fergus Bell; 5 March 1970 (age 56) Belfast, Northern Ireland
- Party: Independent (2016-2017); DUP (2000-2016); UUP (until 2000)
- Spouse: Lisa Bell
- Children: 2
- Education: Queen's University Belfast
- Profession: Social worker

Jonathan Fergus Bell (born 5 March 1970) is a former Northern Irish unionist politician.

As a Democratic Unionist Party (DUP) politician, Bell served as a Member of the Legislative Assembly (MLA) for Strangford from 2010 to 2017.

He served as a Junior Minister in the Office of the First Minister and deputy First Minister from May 2011 until May 2015, before he served as Minister of Enterprise, Trade and Investment from May 2015 until May 2016.

In January 2017, Bell spoke publicly on the BBC Nolan Show, bringing to light the Renewable Heat Incentive scandal, which ultimately led to a Public Inquiry that same month. He was suspended from the Democratic Unionist Party (DUP). He sat as an independent Member of the Northern Ireland Assembly until losing his seat in the 2017 Assembly Elections.

== Early life ==
Bell was the youngest of three children of Fergus Bell, a minister in the Free Methodist Church, and his wife Nora, a secretary. At three months old he survived a bout of whooping cough.

== Political career ==
He sat on Craigavon Borough Council from 1997 until 2005, where he served as both deputy mayor and mayor. Bell was originally elected for the Ulster Unionist Party (UUP) but dissatisfied with the leadership of David Trimble, quit the party in March 2000. In 1999 he was the organiser and spokesperson of a demonstration in favour of Protestant/Unionist rights called "The Long March".

By the time of the 2001 local elections he had joined the DUP. When he was appointed as a Member of the Legislative Assembly (MLA), he was a councillor for the DUP in Ards. On accepting the invitation to replace Robinson as an MLA he resigned his position as a member of the Northern Ireland Human Rights Commission, as the Northern Ireland Act 1998 stipulated that membership of the Commission was incompatible with Assembly membership. Bell had, with UUP member Daphne Trimble, been one of two Commissioners to publicly oppose the Commission's stance on a Bill of Rights for Northern Ireland.

Bell was co-opted to the Northern Ireland Assembly, in 2010, as a member for Strangford, following the resignation of Iris Robinson.

Following his election to the Assembly in May 2011, and his appointment shortly thereafter as a junior minister, Bell worked alongside his Sinn Féin counterpart Martina Anderson to support the diarchy operated by the First Minister and deputy First Minister.

In May 2015, Bell was appointed Minister of Enterprise, Trade and Investment in a re-shuffle of offices held by DUP MLAs which saw Arlene Foster, the previous DETI minister, move to Finance and Personnel. Following the Northern Ireland Assembly election on 5 May 2016, when Bell was elected as MLA for Strangford, DETI was renamed the Department for the Economy. Simon Hamilton became its minister, and Bell left the Executive.

== Controversy ==
In May 2012, Bell attacked golf clubs in Northern Ireland for being a haven for sectarian attitudes, although he later apologised. He claims his attack was "a clumsy use of language".

=== RHI scandal ===
In November 2016, a whistleblower revealed that the Department of Enterprise, Trade and Investment had wasted £400m (which later turned out to be £490m) on a botched energy scheme known as the Renewable Heat Incentive scheme. The scheme was devised under Arlene Foster, Bell's predecessor, who later went on to become First Minister. Bell came under fire as it was claimed that he postponed the closure of the scheme. In the period when Bell was supposed to have postponed the scheme, it transpired that there was a spike in applications and the bill for the scheme had increased massively. Foster also came under fire.

On 16 December 2016, Bell gave an emotional interview with Stephen Nolan for BBC Northern Ireland about his and Foster's involvement with the scandal-hit Renewable Heat Incentive scandal.

He alleged that Foster had ordered the postponement of the closure of the scheme and that her department tried to cover up her involvement in the scheme. Two days later, he was suspended from the party.

The fallout from the RHI scandal led to the opposition parties in the Northern Ireland Assembly to table an exclusion motion to remove Arlene Foster from her position as First Minister. The motion failed on a cross-community vote. In January 2017, Martin McGuinness resigned as deputy First Minister of Northern Ireland in protest at the scheme, prompting the fall of the Executive Office of Northern Ireland.

In February 2017, Bell announced that he would contest the March 2017 Assembly Election as an independent. He said: "I shone a light on the cash for ash scandal and as a result my party suspended me. Everywhere I have gone not a single person has told me I was wrong, in fact people have told me I was not wrong. It's time for the people to pass their verdict."

== Personal life ==
Bell graduated from Queen's University Belfast, with a degree in psychology, and obtained a postgraduate diploma and a master's degree in social work. He worked until 2010 in child care social work. His wife, Lisa Bell, is a nurse. The couple have two children and live in Conlig, County Down.

Civic offices
Preceded by Sam Gardiner	Mayor of Craigavon; 2002–2003	Succeeded by Ignatius Fox
Political offices
Preceded by Robin Newton	Junior Minister; 2011–2015	Succeeded by Michelle McIlveen
Preceded by Arlene Foster	Minister of Enterprise, Trade and Investment; 2015–2016	Succeeded by Simon Hamilton
Northern Ireland Assembly
Preceded by Iris Robinson	MLA for Strangford; 2010–2017	Succeeded by Peter Weir
