= David McNarry =

British politician (born 1948)

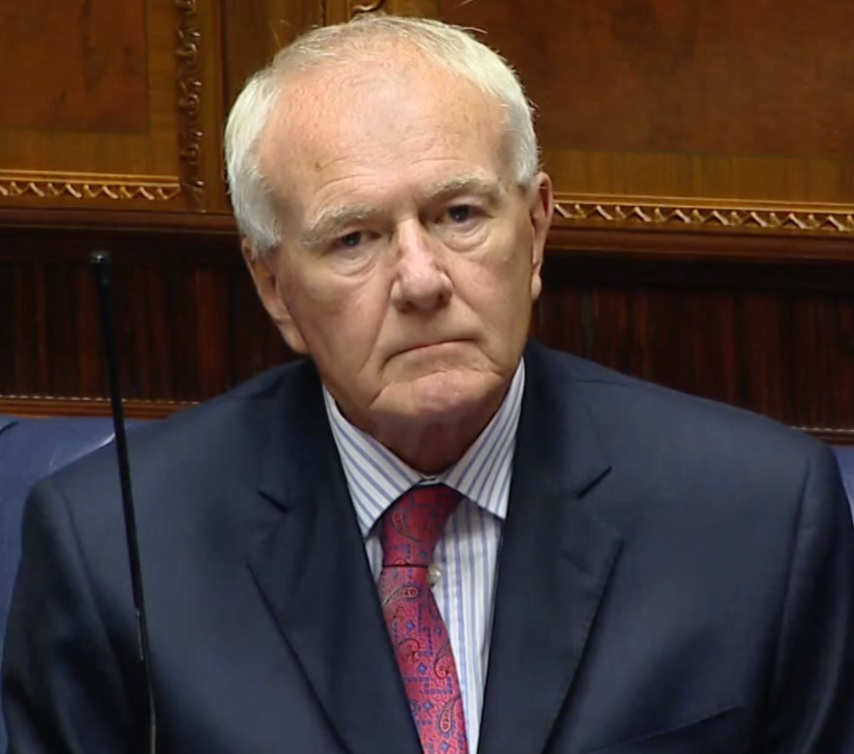

Leader of UKIP Northern Ireland
- In office 4 October 2013 – 28 November 2016
- Leader: Nigel Farage

Member of the Northern Ireland Assembly for Strangford
- In office 26 November 2003 – 30 March 2016
- Preceded by: Tom Hamilton
- Succeeded by: Philip Smith

Member of Ards Borough Council
- In office 21 May 1997 – 7 June 2001
- Preceded by: Stanley McCoy
- Succeeded by: Philip Smith
- Constituency: Ards West

Personal details
- Born: 25 May 1948 (age 78) Northern Ireland
- Party: UKIP (2012–2018); Ulster Unionist (1963–2012)
- Occupation: Businessman

David McNarry (born 25 May 1948) is a former Northern Irish unionist politician and Ulster Loyalist representative who served as a Member of the Legislative Assembly (MLA) for Strangford from 2003 to 2016.

A former member of the Ulster Unionist Party (UUP), he served as chief whip and education spokesman. He defected to the UK Independence Party (UKIP) in 2012, serving as the leader of UKIP Northern Ireland from 2013 to 2016.

== Political career ==
=== UUP ===
In 1973, McNarry stood unsuccessfully as a pro-White Paper Unionist candidate in the election to the Northern Ireland Assembly, and unsuccessfully again, this time for the United Ulster Unionist Council, in the Constitutional Convention election of 1975. He was an unsuccessful candidate for the Ulster Unionist Party in the 1982 Northern Ireland Assembly election, when he stood in North Down.

He was elected to Ards Borough Council in 1997, representing the Ards West District. He did not stand for re-election at the 2001 local elections.

McNarry was his party's candidate for Strangford at the 2001 general election, following the incumbent MP, John Taylor, retiring. Iris Robinson of the Democratic Unionist Party (DUP) was the eventual winner of the seat.

He was elected to the Northern Ireland Assembly at the 2003 Assembly election as an Ulster Unionist member for Strangford.

Prior to his election to the assembly, he was an adviser to First Minister of Northern Ireland, David Trimble. He stood for the party leadership in 2005 along with Alan McFarland and Lord Reg Empey which Empey went on to win. Following the contest, he was appointed as the UUP education spokesman. He is a former chairman of the Ulster Young Unionist Council.

He was re-elected to the Assembly at the 2007 and 2011 elections.

McNarry resigned from the UUP Assembly group on 27 January 2012 after being sacked by party leader Tom Elliott as the Vice Chair of the Assembly Education Committee. During an investigation by a UUP Disciplinary Committee, McNarry was suspended. The new leader Mike Nesbitt commented publicly that he was unlikely to offer McNarry the UUP whip on completion of the suspension.

A Northern Ireland Office (NIO) memo released in 2012 described him as "a dangerous nuisance".

=== UKIP ===
McNarry left the UUP and joined UKIP in October 2012, becoming UKIP's first MLA and first ever Member of a devolved Assembly in the United Kingdom. In 2013, McNarry was elected unopposed as the UKIP Leader in Northern Ireland. In the May 2014 local government elections, under McNarry's stewardship, UKIP gained two new local councillors in the region, taking the total number of UKIP councillors in Northern Ireland up to four. The party also received 24,584 (3.9%) first preference votes in the 2014 European election in Northern Ireland and although they failed to win a seat, this was a significant electoral performance. At the September 2014 UKIP national conference in Doncaster, McNarry delivered a keynote speech which was warmly received by delegates. He received praise from commentators who referred to the speech as a "statesman-like" address. In the speech, he noted that UKIP was the only UK-wide party to have elected representation in each of the four parts of the UK. Under McNarry's stewardship, councillors from the DUP, TUV, and a former UUP Belfast Lord Mayor, Bob Stoker, defected to the party.

In the 2015 United Kingdom general election, UKIP failed to have a candidate elected, but in terms of votes finished as the highest performing of the non-Executive parties in Northern Ireland, receiving 18,324 (2.6%) votes whilst only fielding candidates in ten of the available eighteen seats. Prior to the 2016 Northern Ireland Assembly election, McNarry announced his intention to retire from front-line politics. He did not seek re-election to his Strangford seat, but he did represent the party as its Spokesman in the media during the election campaign. In the election, UKIP fielded 13 candidates and drew 10,109 (1.5%) votes.

In 2016, McNarry said that "foreigners" should be deported from the UK for not paying parking tickets. McNarry was asked by radio presenter Stephen Nolan to clarify UKIP's position. Nolan asked, "If a foreigner gets a parking ticket, they will be deported?" Mr McNarry replied: "Yes." Nolan then said, "So a Polish doctor working really hard in our health service overstays his 30 minute parking, gets a parking ticket. He will be deported?" Mr McNarry replied, "It's a crime, yes."

In November 2016, McNarry's term of Office as UKIP Leader in Northern Ireland formally ended when the party elected its new national leader. He remained a UKIP supporter before leaving front-line politics completely in 2018.

=== After Elected Politics ===
McNarry has been a prolific political commentator in recent years in the media and on websites such as Slugger O'Toole and in the Belfast Telegraph and Belfast News Letter. He is no longer actively involved in party politics in any official capacity. He has however thrown his support in Strangford behind the DUP in recent elections, with the most recent endorsement being the DUP MP Jim Shannon in the 2024 General Election. He sits as a board member of the Ulster-Scots Agency.

== Personal life ==
In 2011 he was the current Assistant Grand Master of the Grand Orange Lodge of Ireland of the Orange Order.

Northern Ireland Assembly
Preceded by Tom Hamilton	MLA for Strangford; 2003–2016	Succeeded by Philip Smith
