= Ards and North Down Borough Council =

Local authority in Northern Ireland

Type
- Type: District council of Ards and North Down

History
- Founded: 1 April 2015
- Preceded by: Ards Borough Council; North Down Borough Council

Leadership
- Mayor: Cllr Craig Blaney, Ulster Unionist Party
- Deputy Mayor: Cllr James Cochrane, Democratic Unionist Party

Structure
- Seats: 40
- Graph of the party split among 40 seats.
- Political groups: All parties (40) DUP (14) Alliance (12) UUP (8) Green (NI) (2) SDLP (1) Independent (3)
- Length of term: 4 years

Elections
- Voting system: Single transferable vote
- Last election: 18 May 2023
- Next election: 6 May 2027

Meeting place
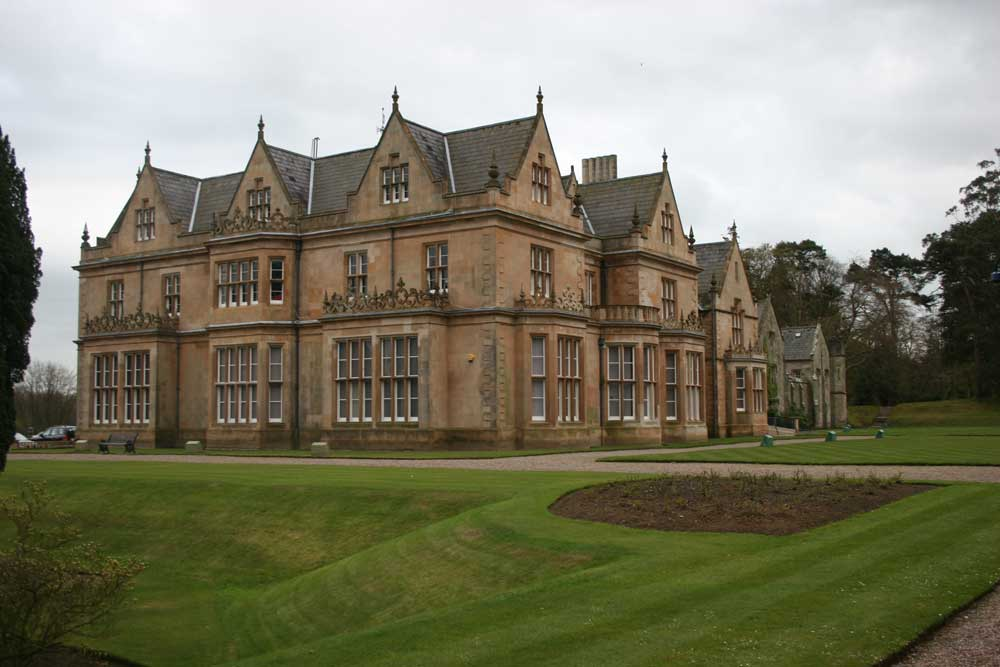
- City Hall, Bangor Castle

Website
- https://ardsandnorthdown.gov.uk

Ards and North Down Borough Council is a local authority in Northern Ireland that was established on 1 April 2015. It replaced Ards Borough Council and North Down Borough Council. The first elections to the authority took place on 22 May 2014 and, prior to the official creation of the Ards and North Down district on 1 April 2015, it acted as a shadow authority.

The district was originally called "North Down and Ards" but the council was known as "Ards and North Down District Council". Councillors on the transitional shadow authority (prior to the council's official creation) voted on 15 December 2014 to submit an application to the Department of the Environment to change the name to East Coast Borough Council with effect from 1 April 2015. Negative public reaction to the proposed name prompted a rethink. The district name "Ards and North Down" was not finalised until 2016. The transfer of the borough charter from North Down Borough Council was delayed until after the district naming.

== Mayoralty ==
=== Mayor ===
From	To	Name	Party
2015	2016	Alan Graham	DUP
2016	2017	Deborah Girvan	Alliance
2017	2018	Robert Adair	DUP
2018	2019	Richard Smart	UUP
2019	2020	Bill Keery	DUP
2020	2021	Trevor Cummings	DUP
2021	2022	Mark Brooks	UUP
2022	2023	Karen Douglas	Alliance
2023	2024	Jennifer Gilmour	DUP
2024	2025	Alistair Cathcart	DUP
2025	2026	Gillian McCollum	Alliance

=== Deputy Mayor ===
From	To	Name	Party
2015	2016	Carl McClean	UUP
2016	2017	William Keery	DUP
2017	2018	Gavin Walker	Alliance
2018	2019	Eddie Thompson	DUP
2019	2020	Karen Douglas	Alliance
2020	2021	Nigel Edmund	DUP
2021	2022	Robert Adair	DUP
2022	2023	Craig Blaney	UUP
2023	2024	Hannah Irwin	Alliance
2024	2025	David Chambers	UUP
2025	2026	Vicky Moore	Alliance

== Councillors ==
For the purpose of elections the council is divided into seven district electoral areas (DEA):

Area	Seats
Ards Peninsula	6
Bangor Central	6
Bangor East and Donaghadee	6
Bangor West	5
Comber	5
Holywood and Clandeboye	5
Newtownards	7

=== Party strengths ===
Party	Elected 2014	Elected 2019	Elected 2023
DUP	17	14	14
Alliance	7	10	12
UUP	9	8	8
Green (NI)	3	3	2
SDLP	1	1	1
TUV	1	1	0
Independent	2	3	3

=== Councillors by electoral area ===
Borders of the DEAs within Ards and North Down

For further details see 2023 Ards and North Down Borough Council election.

Current council members
District electoral area	Name	Party
Ards Peninsula	Robert Adair	DUP
Ards Peninsula	Lorna McAlpine	Alliance
Ards Peninsula	Joe Boyle	SDLP
Ards Peninsula	Nigel Edmund	DUP
Ards Peninsula	David Kerr	DUP
Ards Peninsula	Pete Wray	UUP
Bangor Central	Alex Harbinson †	Alliance
Bangor Central	Wesley Irvine	Independent
Bangor Central	Alistair Cathcart	DUP
Bangor Central	Craig Blaney	UUP
Bangor Central	Chris McCraken	Alliance
Bangor Central	Tom Brady †	Independent
Bangor East and Donaghadee	Mark Brooks	UUP
Bangor East and Donaghadee	Rosaleen Quinn †	Alliance
Bangor East and Donaghadee	James Cochrane	DUP
Bangor East and Donaghadee	David Chambers	UUP
Bangor East and Donaghadee	John Hennessy †	Alliance
Bangor East and Donaghadee	Eddie Thompson †	DUP
Bangor West	Naomi McBurney †	Alliance
Bangor West	Jennifer Gilmour	DUP
Bangor West	Katherine Newman †	UUP
Bangor West	Carl McClean †	DUP
Bangor West	Barry McKee	Green (NI)
Comber	Libby Douglas	DUP
Comber	Philip Smith	UUP
Comber	Trevor Cummings	DUP
Comber	Patricia Morgan	Alliance
Comber	Rachel Ashe	Alliance
Holywood and Clandeboye	Alan Graham	DUP
Holywood and Clandeboye	Stephen Hollywood †	UUP
Holywood and Clandeboye	Martin McRandal	Alliance
Holywood and Clandeboye	Lauren Kendall †	Green (NI)
Holywood and Clandeboye	Gillian McCollum †	Alliance
Newtownards	Steven Irvine	Independent
Newtownards	Naomi Armstrong	DUP
Newtownards	Richard Smart	UUP
Newtownards	Alan McDowell	Alliance
Newtownards	Stephen McIllveen	DUP
Newtownards	Vicky Moore	Alliance
Newtownards	Colin Kennedy	DUP

== Population ==
The area covered by the new borough has 163,659 residents according to the 2021 Northern Ireland census.
