= Ards West =

District electoral areas in Ards, Northern Ireland

Ards West DEA (1993-2014) within Ards

Ards West was one of the four district electoral areas in Ards, Northern Ireland which existed from 1985 to 2014. The district elected seven members to Ards Borough Council, and formed part of Strangford constituencies for the Northern Ireland Assembly and UK Parliament.

It was created for the 1985 local elections, replacing Ards Area C which had existed since 1973, and contained the wards of Ballygowan, Comber North, Comber South, Comber West, Killinchy and West Winds. It was abolished for the 2014 local elections and replaced by the Comber DEA.

== Councillors ==
| Election | Councillor (party) | Councillor (party) | Councillor (party) | Councillor (party) | Councillor (party) | Councillor (party) |
|---|---|---|---|---|---|---|
| 2011 | Deborah Girvan (Alliance) | Philip Smith (UUP) | James Fletcher (UUP) | Trevor Cummings (DUP) | Mervyn Oswald (DUP) | Robert Gibson (DUP)/ (UUP) |
| 2005 | Jim McBriar (Alliance) | Margaret Craig (DUP)/ (UUP) | James Fletcher (UUP) | William Montgomery (DUP) | Mervyn Oswald (DUP) | Robert Gibson (DUP)/ (UUP) |
| 2001 | Jim McBriar (Alliance) | Margaret Craig (DUP)/ (UUP) | Philip Smith (UUP) | William Montgomery (DUP) | David Gilmore (DUP) | Robert Gibson (DUP)/ (UUP) |
| 1997 | Jim McBriar (Alliance) | Margaret Craig (DUP)/ (UUP) | David McNarry (UUP) | Kathleen Coulter (Alliance) | David Gilmore (DUP) | Robert Gibson (DUP)/ (UUP) |
| 1993 | Jim McBriar (Alliance) | Margaret Craig (DUP)/ (UUP) | Stanley McCoy (UUP) | Kathleen Coulter (Alliance) | Simpson Gibson (DUP) | Robert Gibson (DUP)/ (UUP) |
| 1989 | Jim McBriar (Alliance) | Bobby McBride (UUP)/ (DUP) | Edward Archdale (UUP) | David McKibbin (DUP) | John Hamilton (DUP) | Robert Gibson (DUP)/ (UUP) |
| 1985 | Jim McBriar (Alliance) | Bobby McBride (UUP)/ (DUP) | Stanley McCoy (UUP) | Thomas Gourley (DUP) | John Hamilton (DUP) | Robert Gibson (DUP)/ (UUP) |

== 2011 election ==
2005: 3 x DUP, 2 x UUP, 1 x Alliance

2011: 3 x DUP, 2 x UUP, 1 x Alliance

2005-2011 change: No change

Ards West - 6 seats
| Party | Candidate | FPv% | Count | | | | | |
| Party | Candidate | FPv% | 1 | 2 | 3 | 4 | 5 | 6 |
|---|---|---|---|---|---|---|---|---|
| DUP | Robert Gibson* | 23.10% | 1,519 | | | | | |
| DUP | Trevor Cummings | 16.13% | 1,061 | | | | | |
| DUP | Mervyn Oswald* | 13.20% | 868 | 1,300.12 | | | | |
| UUP | James Fletcher* | 13.40% | 881 | 929.75 | 1,063.31 | | | |
| UUP | Philip Smith | 7.16% | 471 | 497.91 | 615.72 | 663.56 | 767.51 | 935.53 |
| Alliance | Deborah Girvan | 11.60% | 763 | 775.87 | 804.22 | 832.61 | 833.24 | 872.75 |
| Alliance | Jim McBriar* | 8.24% | 542 | 572.03 | 600.38 | 619.77 | 623.55 | 661.78 |
| TUV | Jack Allister | 5.22% | 343 | 358.21 | 400.42 | 412.81 | 414.07 | |
| NI Conservatives | Bill McKendry | 1.96% | 129 | 133.68 | 138.72 | | | |
Electorate: 13,199 Valid: 6,577 (49.83%) Spoilt: 115 Quota: 941 Turnout: 6,692 (50.70%)

== 2005 election ==
2001: 3 x DUP, 2 x UUP, 1 x Alliance

2005: 3 x DUP, 2 x UUP, 1 x Alliance

2001-2005 change: No change

Ards West - 6 seats
| Party | Candidate | FPv% | Count | | | |
| Party | Candidate | FPv% | 1 | 2 | 3 | 4 |
|---|---|---|---|---|---|---|
| DUP | Margaret Craig* | 17.51% | 1,227 | | | |
| Alliance | Jim McBriar* | 15.27% | 1,070 | | | |
| UUP | Robert Gibson* | 14.04% | 984 | 1,003.26 | | |
| UUP | James Fletcher | 11.36% | 796 | 804.1 | 1,154.1 | |
| DUP | William Montgomery* | 13.69% | 959 | 994.28 | 1,021.28 | |
| DUP | Mervyn Oswald | 12.56% | 880 | 893.14 | 915.04 | 981.04 |
| DUP | David Gilmore* | 9.21% | 645 | 784.14 | 798.04 | 851.04 |
| UUP | Philip Smith* | 6.37% | 446 | 449.78 | | |
Electorate: 12,766 Valid: 7,007 (54.89%) Spoilt: 140 Quota: 1,002 Turnout: 7,147 (55.98%)

== 2001 election ==
1997: 3 x UUP, 2 x Alliance, 1 x DUP

2001: 3 x DUP, 2 x UUP, 1 x Alliance

1997-2001 change: DUP (two seats) gain from UUP and Alliance

Ards West - 6 seats
| Party | Candidate | FPv% | Count | | | | | |
| Party | Candidate | FPv% | 1 | 2 | 3 | 4 | 5 | 6 |
|---|---|---|---|---|---|---|---|---|
| UUP | Robert Gibson* | 30.56% | 2,454 | | | | | |
| DUP | Margaret Craig* | 15.32% | 1,230 | | | | | |
| UUP | Philip Smith | 7.78% | 625 | 1,516.55 | | | | |
| DUP | William Montgomery | 12.94% | 1,039 | 1,098.95 | 1,100.56 | 1,117.89 | 1,124.49 | 1,175.49 |
| Alliance | Jim McBriar* | 9.41% | 756 | 835.75 | 840.35 | 866.23 | 867.07 | 1,023.47 |
| DUP | David Gilmore* | 8.63% | 693 | 789.25 | 794.08 | 810.63 | 873.15 | 1,001.09 |
| Alliance | Kathleen Coulter* | 9.12% | 732 | 791.4 | 795.08 | 842.96 | 843.92 | 965.11 |
| UUP | Arthur Spence | 3.87% | 311 | 412.75 | 762.35 | 829.73 | 830.93 | |
| NI Conservatives | Christopher Connolly | 2.37% | 190 | 205.4 | 207.01 | | | |
Electorate: 13,602 Valid: 8,030 (59.04%) Spoilt: 223 Quota: 1,148 Turnout: 8,253 (60.67%)

== 1997 election ==
1993: 3 x UUP, 2 x Alliance, 1 x DUP

1997: 3 x UUP, 2 x Alliance, 1 x DUP

1993-1997 change: No change

Ards West - 6 seats
| Party | Candidate | FPv% | Count | | | | | |
| Party | Candidate | FPv% | 1 | 2 | 3 | 4 | 5 | 6 |
|---|---|---|---|---|---|---|---|---|
| UUP | Robert Gibson* | 22.59% | 1,103 | | | | | |
| UUP | David McNarry | 21.83% | 1,066 | | | | | |
| Alliance | Kathleen Coulter* | 15.18% | 741 | | | | | |
| UUP | Margaret Craig* | 11.71% | 572 | 871.52 | | | | |
| DUP | David Gilmore | 13.00% | 635 | 683.75 | 877.19 | | | |
| Alliance | Jim McBriar* | 9.85% | 481 | 511.03 | 595.27 | 599.43 | 654.81 | 693.81 |
| DUP | Lorraine Gilmore | 5.84% | 285 | 311.13 | 398.49 | 552.93 | 649.26 | 650.58 |
Electorate: 12,917 Valid: 4,883 (37.80%) Spoilt: 70 Quota: 698 Turnout: 4,953 (38.34%)

== 1993 election ==
1989: 3 x UUP, 2 x DUP, 1 x Alliance

1993: 3 x UUP, 2 x Alliance, 1 x DUP

1989-1993 change: Alliance gain from DUP

Ards West - 6 seats
| Party | Candidate | FPv% | Count | | | |
| Party | Candidate | FPv% | 1 | 2 | 3 | 4 |
|---|---|---|---|---|---|---|
| UUP | Robert Gibson* | 26.41% | 1,318 | | | |
| DUP | Simpson Gibson* | 14.75% | 736 | | | |
| UUP | Margaret Craig | 12.92% | 645 | 906.6 | | |
| Alliance | Jim McBriar* | 12.70% | 634 | 671.44 | 684.15 | 750.15 |
| Alliance | Kathleen Coulter | 12.34% | 616 | 628.48 | 637.91 | 712.68 |
| UUP | Stanley McCoy | 5.39% | 269 | 472.52 | 604.13 | 674.94 |
| DUP | Richard Finlay | 9.64% | 481 | 542.44 | 571.55 | 611.56 |
| NI Conservatives | Robert Darnley | 5.85% | 292 | 307.84 | 315.22 | |
Electorate: 12,414 Valid: 4,991 (40.20%) Spoilt: 118 Quota: 714 Turnout: 5,109 (41.16%)

== 1989 election ==
1985: 3 x DUP, 2 x UUP, 1 x Alliance

1989: 3 x UUP, 2 x DUP, 1 x Alliance

1985-1989 change: UUP gain from DUP

Ards West - 6 seats
| Party | Candidate | FPv% | Count | | | | | |
| Party | Candidate | FPv% | 1 | 2 | 3 | 4 | 5 | 6 |
|---|---|---|---|---|---|---|---|---|
| UUP | Robert Gibson* | 23.16% | 1,375 | | | | | |
| UUP | Edward Archdale | 13.73% | 815 | 930.05 | | | | |
| UUP | Bobby McBride* | 13.02% | 773 | 856.46 | | | | |
| DUP | David McKibbin | 10.43% | 619 | 698.17 | 702.09 | 759.48 | 887.48 | |
| Alliance | Jim McBriar* | 11.12% | 660 | 692.37 | 696.57 | 700.57 | 706.8 | 1,072.8 |
| DUP | John Hamilton* | 10.97% | 651 | 684.15 | 689.47 | 727.47 | 817.61 | 822.78 |
| UUP | William Elliott | 4.60% | 273 | 427.05 | 488.37 | 497.65 | 515 | 530.07 |
| Alliance | Alan McDowell | 6.52% | 387 | 393.24 | 394.08 | 400.08 | 402.08 | |
| DUP | Glynn Moore | 3.20% | 190 | 205.21 | 207.45 | 268.12 | | |
| DUP | Andrew Marks | 3.27% | 194 | 195.17 | 196.01 | | | |
Electorate: 13,303 Valid: 5,937 (44.63%) Spoilt: 136 Quota: 849 Turnout: 6,073 (45.65%)

== 1985 election ==
1985: 3 x DUP, 2 x UUP, 1 x Alliance

Ards West - 6 seats
| Party | Candidate | FPv% | Count | | | | | |
| Party | Candidate | FPv% | 1 | 2 | 3 | 4 | 5 | 6 |
|---|---|---|---|---|---|---|---|---|
| DUP | Thomas Gourley* | 24.29% | 1,493 | | | | | |
| UUP | Robert Gibson | 24.13% | 1,483 | | | | | |
| DUP | John Hamilton* | 9.58% | 589 | 1,040.82 | | | | |
| Alliance | Jim McBriar* | 13.00% | 799 | 816.63 | 851.07 | 854.37 | 1,098.37 | |
| UUP | Stanley McCoy | 10.27% | 631 | 666.26 | 801.92 | 809.72 | 899.72 | |
| DUP | Bobby McBride | 9.08% | 558 | 626.88 | 658.38 | 798.93 | 830.63 | 860.63 |
| UUP | Trevor Hussey | 2.80% | 172 | 187.58 | 529.46 | 534.56 | 625.38 | 716.38 |
| Alliance | Alan McDowell | 4.03% | 248 | 249.23 | 257.63 | 257.78 | | |
| UUP | Arthur Spence | 2.13% | 131 | 135.92 | 166.58 | 167.93 | | |
| Independent | Johnston Haire | 0.70% | 43 | 53.66 | 70.46 | 71.06 | | |
Electorate: 12,416 Valid: 6,147 (49.51%) Spoilt: 143 Quota: 879 Turnout: 6,290 (50.66%)
