= Ards Peninsula (District Electoral Area) =

District electoral area in Ards and North Down, Northern Ireland

- Ards and North Down Borough Council DEA constituency

Current constituency
- Created: 1985
- Seats: 7 (1985-1993); 5 (1993–2014); 6 (2014-)
- Councillors: Robert Adair (DUP); Joe Boyle (SDLP); Nigel Edmund (DUP); Davy Kerr (DUP); Lorna McAlpine (APNI); Pete Wray (UUP)

Ards Peninsula DEA within Ards and North Down

Ards Peninsula DEA (1993-2014) within Ards

Ards Peninsula is one of the seven district electoral areas (DEA) in Ards and North Down, Northern Ireland. The district elects five members to Ards and North Down Borough Council and contains the wards of Ballywalter, Carrowdore, Kircubbin, Loughries, Portaferry and Portavogie. Ards Peninsula forms part of the Strangford constituencies for the Northern Ireland Assembly and UK Parliament.

It was created for the 1985 local elections, replacing Ards Area A, which had existed since 1973, and originally contained seven wards (Ballywalter, Donaghadee North, Donaghadee South, Kircubbin, Millisle, Portaferry and Portavogie). For the 1993 local elections it was reduced to five wards, gaining Carrowdore but losing Donaghadee North, Donaghadee South and Millisle to the new Ards East DEA. For the 2014 local elections, it was increased to six wards, regaining Millisle while Donaghadee moved to the new Bangor East and Donaghadee DEA.

== Councillors ==
| Election | Councillor (party) | Councillor (party) | Councillor (party) | Councillor (party) | Councillor (party) | Councillor (party) | Councillor (party) |
|---|---|---|---|---|---|---|---|
| 2023 | Lorna McAlpine (Alliance) | Joe Boyle (SDLP) | Pete Wray (UUP) | Robert Adair (DUP) | Nigel Edmund (DUP) | Davy Kerr (DUP) | 6 seats 2014–present |
| 2019 | Lorna McAlpine (Alliance) | Joe Boyle (SDLP) | Angus Carson (UUP) | Robert Adair (DUP) | Nigel Edmund (DUP) | Eddie Thompson (DUP) | 6 seats 2014–present |
| June 2016 Co-Option | Lorna McAlpine (Alliance) | Joe Boyle (SDLP) | Angus Carson (UUP) | Robert Adair (DUP) | Nigel Edmund (DUP) | Eddie Thompson (DUP) | 6 seats 2014–present |
| 2014 | Kellie Armstrong (Alliance) | Joe Boyle (SDLP) | Angus Carson (UUP) | Robert Adair (DUP) | Nigel Edmund (DUP) | Eddie Thompson (DUP) | 6 seats 2014–present |
| 2011 | Kieran McCarthy (Alliance) | Joe Boyle (SDLP) | Angus Carson (UUP) | Robert Adair (DUP) | Colin Kennedy (DUP) | 5 seats 1993-2014 | 6 seats 2014–present |
| 2005 | Kieran McCarthy (Alliance) | Joe Boyle (SDLP) | Angus Carson (UUP) | Jim Shannon (DUP) | Robert Drysdale (DUP) | 5 seats 1993-2014 | 6 seats 2014–present |
| 2001 | Kieran McCarthy (Alliance) | Daniel McCarthy (SDLP) | Angus Carson (UUP) | Jim Shannon (DUP) | Robert Drysdale (DUP) | 5 seats 1993-2014 | 6 seats 2014–present |
| 1997 | Kieran McCarthy (Alliance) | Daniel McCarthy (SDLP) | Paul Carson (UUP) | Jim Shannon (DUP) | Robert Drysdale (DUP) | 5 seats 1993-2014 | 6 seats 2014–present |
| 1993 | Kieran McCarthy (Alliance) | William Sheldon (Alliance) | Robert Ambrose (UUP) | Jim Shannon (DUP) | James McMullan (Independent) | 5 seats 1993-2014 | 6 seats 2014–present |
| 1989 | Kieran McCarthy (Alliance) | Clifford Auld (Alliance) | Robert Ambrose (UUP) | Jim Shannon (DUP) | Mervyn Rea (DUP) | John Shields (UUP) | Ronald Ferguson (UUP) |
| 1985 | Kieran McCarthy (Alliance) | Thomas Byers (Independent) | Robert Ambrose (UUP) | Jim Shannon (DUP) | Oliver Johnston (DUP) | John Shields (UUP) | Gladys McIntyre (UPUP) |

== 2023 election ==
2019: 3 x DUP, 1 x SDLP, 1 x UUP, 1 x Alliance

2023: 3 x DUP, 1 x SDLP, 1 x UUP, 1 x Alliance

2019–2023 change: No change

Ards Peninsula - 6 seats
| Party | Candidate | FPv% | Count | | | | |
| Party | Candidate | FPv% | 1 | 2 | 3 | 4 | 5 |
|---|---|---|---|---|---|---|---|
| DUP | Robert Adair* | 21.33% | 1,959 | | | | |
| Alliance | Lorna McAlpine* | 13.78% | 1,266 | 1,273.92 | 1,383.92 | | |
| SDLP | Joe Boyle* | 13.93% | 1,279 | 1,288.24 | 1,308.57 | 1,314.57 | |
| DUP | Nigel Edmund* | 6.89% | 633 | 996.99 | 1,003.32 | 1,174.22 | 1,675.22 |
| DUP | Davy Kerr | 9.00% | 827 | 990.68 | 1,014.99 | 1,165.61 | 1,314.61 |
| UUP | Pete Wray | 8.05% | 739 | 773.98 | 810.31 | 949.27 | 1,069.06 |
| Sinn Féin | Noel Sands | 10.29% | 945 | 946.65 | 963.65 | 964.65 | 965.65 |
| DUP | Eddie Thompson* | 7.48% | 687 | 720.00 | 725.33 | 852.62 | |
| TUV | Tom Thompson | 6.45% | 592 | 616.09 | 628.09 | | |
| Green (NI) | Gilian McNaull | 1.62% | 149 | 149.99 | | | |
| Independent | Boyd Ireland | 1.18% | 108 | 111.63 | | | |
Electorate: 19,000 Valid: 9,184 (48.34%) Spoilt: 111 Quota: 1,313 Turnout: 9,925 (52.24%)

== 2019 election ==
2014: 3 x DUP, 1 x SDLP, 1 x UUP, 1 x Alliance

2019: 3 x DUP, 1 x SDLP, 1 x UUP, 1 x Alliance

2014-2019 change: No change

Ards Peninsula - 6 seats
| Party | Candidate | FPv% | Count | | | | | | |
| Party | Candidate | FPv% | 1 | 2 | 3 | 4 | 5 | 6 | 7 |
|---|---|---|---|---|---|---|---|---|---|
| DUP | Robert Adair* | 27.93% | 2,189 | | | | | | |
| SDLP | Joe Boyle* | 20.68% | 1,621 | | | | | | |
| DUP | Nigel Edmund* | 9.38% | 735 | 1,511.5 | | | | | |
| DUP | Eddie Thompson* | 10.48% | 821 | 931 | 934.15 | 1,273.15 | | | |
| UUP | Angus Carson* | 10.62% | 832 | 943.5 | 968.7 | 995.45 | 1,020.2 | 1,132 | |
| Alliance | Lorna McAlpine* | 10.62% | 832 | 849 | 1,079.65 | 1,083.9 | 1,085.75 | 1,088.95 | 1,124.95 |
| Green (NI) | Michele Strong | 4.07% | 319 | 333 | 372.9 | 375.9 | 383.25 | 388.25 | 434.25 |
| Sinn Féin | Murdoch McKibbin | 2.50% | 196 | 197.5 | 380.9 | 381.4 | 382.4 | 382.6 | 384.6 |
| UKIP | Matt Davey | 2.98% | 234 | 267.5 | 274.15 | 279.15 | 291.15 | 322.55 | |
| NI Conservatives | Tim Mullen | 0.74% | 58 | 61 | 62.05 | 63.05 | | | |
Electorate: 17,582 Valid: 7,837 (44.57%) Spoilt: 119 Quota: 1,120 Turnout: 7,956 (45.25%)

== 2014 election ==
2011: 2 x DUP, 1 x SDLP, 1 x Alliance, 1 x UUP

2014: 3 x DUP, 1 x SDLP, 1 x UUP, 1 x Alliance

2011-2014 change: DUP gain due to the addition of one seat

Ards Peninsula - 6 seats
| Party | Candidate | FPv% | Count | | | | | | | |
| Party | Candidate | FPv% | 1 | 2 | 3 | 4 | 5 | 6 | 7 | 8 |
|---|---|---|---|---|---|---|---|---|---|---|
| DUP | Robert Adair* | 24.48% | 1,773 | | | | | | | |
| SDLP | Joe Boyle* | 19.15% | 1,387 | | | | | | | |
| UUP | Angus Carson* | 16.55% | 1,199 | | | | | | | |
| DUP | Nigel Edmund | 8.57% | 621 | 1,159.79 | | | | | | |
| Alliance | Kellie Armstrong* † | 6.06% | 439 | 457.49 | 605.69 | 619.46 | 620.56 | 650.47 | 862 | 1,074 |
| DUP | Eddie Thompson* | 7.25% | 456 | 535.12 | 539.02 | 604.98 | 697.88 | 712.11 | 788.67 | 800 |
| DUP | Louise Wallace | 7.72% | 559 | 616.19 | 618.29 | 653.99 | 669.89 | 678.18 | 701.41 | 703.31 |
| Sinn Féin | Sheila Bailie | 5.36% | 388 | 390.58 | 535.48 | 535.82 | 535.92 | 538.82 | 557.69 | |
| NI Conservatives | Paul Leeman | 2.22% | 161 | 180.35 | 185.75 | 215.67 | 220.17 | 246.71 | | |
| Alliance | Colin McCormick | 2.02% | 146 | 150.73 | 190.33 | 200.02 | 200.72 | 220.09 | | |
| NI21 | John Bustard | 1.57% | 114 | 117.87 | 125.07 | 131.7 | 132.1 | | | |
Electorate: 16,656 Valid: 7,243 (43.49%) Spoilt: 126 Quota: 1,035 Turnout: 7,369 (44.24%)

== 2011 election ==
2005: 2 x DUP, 1 x SDLP, 1 x Alliance, 1 x UUP

2011: 2 x DUP, 1 x SDLP, 1 x Alliance, 1 x UUP

2005-2011 change: No change

Ards Peninsula - 5 seats
| Party | Candidate | FPv% | Count | | | | | |
| Party | Candidate | FPv% | 1 | 2 | 3 | 4 | 5 | 6 |
|---|---|---|---|---|---|---|---|---|
| SDLP | Joe Boyle* | 24.24% | 1,473 | | | | | |
| DUP | Robert Adair | 17.56% | 1,067 | | | | | |
| Alliance | Kieran McCarthy* | 15.50% | 942 | 1,271.3 | | | | |
| DUP | Colin Kennedy | 11.95% | 726 | 728.59 | 732.37 | 770.53 | 823.53 | 1,140.53 |
| UUP | Angus Carson* | 11.83% | 719 | 731.21 | 746.33 | 803.28 | 879.02 | 954.44 |
| Alliance | Kellie Armstrong | 4.74% | 288 | 366.44 | 568.04 | 587.31 | 628.05 | 646.74 |
| DUP | John Prentice | 6.91% | 420 | 423.33 | 429.21 | 442.58 | 507.79 | |
| Independent | Joe Hagan | 4.30% | 261 | 269.14 | 280.48 | 314.22 | | |
| Independent | Robert Drysdale* | 2.96% | 180 | 197.76 | 215.4 | | | |
Electorate: 12,879 Valid: 6,076 (47.18%) Spoilt: 132 Quota: 1,014 Turnout: 6,208 (48.20%)

== 2005 election ==
2001: 2 x DUP, 1 x Alliance, 1 x SDLP, 1 x UUP

2005: 2 x DUP, 1 x Alliance, 1 x SDLP, 1 x UUP

2001-2005 change: No change

Ards Peninsula - 5 seats
| Party | Candidate | FPv% | Count | | | |
| Party | Candidate | FPv% | 1 | 2 | 3 | 4 |
|---|---|---|---|---|---|---|
| DUP | Jim Shannon* | 31.44% | 1,944 | | | |
| Alliance | Kieran McCarthy* | 16.01% | 990 | 1,074.13 | | |
| SDLP | Joe Boyle | 14.77% | 913 | 918.17 | 1,303.17 | |
| DUP | Robert Drysdale* | 10.72% | 663 | 1,024.43 | 1,034.43 | |
| UUP | Angus Carson* | 11.37% | 703 | 801.7 | 854.93 | 937.93 |
| DUP | Colin Kennedy | 6.60% | 408 | 745.93 | 761.69 | 774.69 |
| Sinn Féin | Anthony Lacken | 4.72% | 292 | 293.88 | | |
| Independent | Daniel McCarthy* | 4.37% | 270 | 281.28 | | |
Electorate: 11,725 Valid: 6,183 (52.73%) Spoilt: 130 Quota: 1,031 Turnout: 6,313 (53.84%)

== 2001 election ==
1997: 2 x DUP, 1 x UUP, 1 x Alliance, 1 x SDLP

2001: 2 x DUP, 1 x UUP, 1 x Alliance, 1 x SDLP

1997-2001 change: No change

Ards Peninsula - 5 seats
| Party | Candidate | FPv% | Count | | | | | | | |
| Party | Candidate | FPv% | 1 | 2 | 3 | 4 | 5 | 6 | 7 | 8 |
|---|---|---|---|---|---|---|---|---|---|---|
| DUP | Jim Shannon* | 26.53% | 1,824 | | | | | | | |
| Alliance | Kieran McCarthy* | 18.71% | 1,286 | | | | | | | |
| DUP | Robert Drysdale* | 10.25% | 705 | 1,222.92 | | | | | | |
| SDLP | Daniel McCarthy* | 12.51% | 860 | 865.85 | 899.51 | 918.84 | 1,025.08 | 1,025.88 | 1,430.88 | |
| UUP | Angus Carson | 10.33% | 710 | 748.22 | 755.81 | 766.28 | 864.5 | 894.8 | 944.8 | 1,008.8 |
| UUP | Paul Carson* | 7.56% | 520 | 583.96 | 593.97 | 603.82 | 671.15 | 710.75 | 731.42 | 765.42 |
| Independent | Joe Boyle | 7.65% | 526 | 528.73 | 543.58 | 553.75 | 646.87 | 648.67 | | |
| Independent | Robert Ambrose | 3.71% | 255 | 289.32 | 298.01 | 307.13 | | | | |
| Independent | James McMullan | 2.23% | 153 | 155.73 | 162.99 | 166.58 | | | | |
| Alliance | Stephen McSherry | 0.51% | 35 | 38.12 | 85.2 | | | | | |
Electorate: 11,849 Valid: 6,874 (58.01%) Spoilt: 211 Quota: 1,146 Turnout: 7,085 (59.79%)

== 1997 election ==
1993: 2 x Alliance, 1 x DUP, 1 x UUP, 1 x Independent

1997: 2 x DUP, 1 x UUP, 1 x Alliance, 1 x SDLP

1997-2001 change: DUP and SDLP gain from Alliance and Independent

Ards Peninsula - 5 seats
| Party | Candidate | FPv% | Count | | | | |
| Party | Candidate | FPv% | 1 | 2 | 3 | 4 | 5 |
|---|---|---|---|---|---|---|---|
| UUP | Paul Carson | 22.57% | 1,114 | | | | |
| Alliance | Kieran McCarthy* | 21.21% | 1,047 | | | | |
| DUP | Jim Shannon* | 20.12% | 993 | | | | |
| DUP | Robert Drysdale | 10.25% | 473 | 687.21 | 696.01 | 849.01 | |
| SDLP | Daniel McCarthy | 15.60% | 770 | 777.44 | 808.9 | 810.52 | 930.52 |
| Alliance | William Sheldon* | 3.12% | 154 | 202.98 | 315.62 | 325.16 | 346.72 |
| Alliance | John Smyth | 4.48% | 221 | 227.82 | 279.3 | 281.82 | 296.02 |
| SDLP | Iain Bell | 2.65% | 131 | 131 | 141.12 | 141.48 | |
| Green (NI) | Owen Crawford | 0.67% | 33 | 40.75 | 44.49 | 45.75 | |
Electorate: 11,165 Valid: 4,936 (44.21%) Spoilt: 101 Quota: 824 Turnout: 5,037 (45.11%)

== 1993 election ==
1989: 3 x UUP, 2 x DUP, 2 x Alliance

1993: 2 x Alliance, 1 x DUP, 1 x UUP, 1 x Independent

1989-1993 change: UUP (two seats) and DUP loss to Independent and due to the reduction of two seats

Ards Peninsula - 5 seats
| Party | Candidate | FPv% | Count | | | |
| Party | Candidate | FPv% | 1 | 2 | 3 | 4 |
|---|---|---|---|---|---|---|
| Alliance | Kieran McCarthy* | 32.39% | 1,546 | | | |
| DUP | Jim Shannon* | 18.77% | 896 | | | |
| Independent | James McMullan | 13.74% | 656 | 818.76 | | |
| UUP | Robert Ambrose* | 14.94% | 713 | 758.24 | 943.24 | |
| Alliance | William Sheldon | 4.53% | 216 | 723 | 743.28 | 770.28 |
| DUP | Thomas Cully | 10.16% | 485 | 498 | 539.08 | 599.08 |
| UUP | Samuel Brown | 5.47% | 261 | 275.56 | | |
Electorate: 10,416 Valid: 4,773 (45.82%) Spoilt: 158 Quota: 796 Turnout: 4,931 (47.34%)

== 1989 election ==
1985: 2 x UUP, 2 x DUP, 1 x Alliance, 1 x UPUP, 1 x Independent

1989: 3 x UUP, 2 x DUP, 2 x Alliance

1985-1989 change: UUP and Alliance gain from UPUP and Independent

Ards Peninsula - 7 seats
| Party | Candidate | FPv% | Count | | | | | | | |
| Party | Candidate | FPv% | 1 | 2 | 3 | 4 | 5 | 6 | 7 | 8 |
|---|---|---|---|---|---|---|---|---|---|---|
| Alliance | Kieran McCarthy* | 16.19% | 1,119 | | | | | | | |
| DUP | Jim Shannon* | 14.90% | 1,030 | | | | | | | |
| UUP | John Shields* | 14.73% | 1,018 | | | | | | | |
| UUP | Robert Ambrose* | 14.59% | 1,008 | | | | | | | |
| DUP | Mervyn Rea | 8.45% | 584 | 588.56 | 682.4 | 705.49 | 738.45 | 748.8 | 1,139.8 | |
| UUP | Ronald Ferguson | 6.64% | 459 | 464.52 | 474.21 | 586.38 | 688.3 | 786.85 | 845.31 | 983.31 |
| Alliance | Clifford Auld | 7.41% | 512 | 698 | 705.48 | 717.3 | 726.1 | 742 | 753.72 | 765.72 |
| Independent | James McMullan | 8.16% | 564 | 616.32 | 616.83 | 616.83 | 617.95 | 619 | 624.15 | 632.15 |
| DUP | Oliver Johnston* | 6.54% | 452 | 453.44 | 502.4 | 511.57 | 519.09 | 531.84 | | |
| UUP | Trevor Hussey | 2.39% | 165 | 167.4 | 172.5 | | | | | |
Electorate: 16,006 Valid: 6,911 (43.18%) Spoilt: 229 Quota: 864 Turnout: 7,140 (44.61%)

== 1985 election ==
1985: 2 x DUP, 2 x UUP, 1 x UPUP, 1 x Alliance, 1 x Independent

Ards Peninsula - 7 seats
| Party | Candidate | FPv% | Count | | | | | | |
| Party | Candidate | FPv% | 1 | 2 | 3 | 4 | 5 | 6 | 7 |
|---|---|---|---|---|---|---|---|---|---|
| UPUP | Gladys McIntyre* | 13.68% | 999 | | | | | | |
| UUP | Robert Ambrose* | 11.46% | 837 | 849.4 | 928.4 | | | | |
| Independent | Thomas Byers | 11.07% | 808 | 808.4 | 826.48 | 830.56 | 1,058.56 | | |
| Alliance | Kieran McCarthy | 6.22% | 454 | 455.76 | 466 | 667.92 | 816.92 | 944.92 | |
| UUP | John Shields | 8.34% | 609 | 625.16 | 641.28 | 668.24 | 669.32 | 669.32 | 1,036.32 |
| DUP | Jim Shannon | 11.46% | 837 | 844.36 | 858.32 | 863.64 | 863.64 | 863.64 | 899 |
| DUP | Oliver Johnston* | 11.11% | 811 | 819.8 | 822.2 | 823.36 | 827.36 | 828.36 | 867.12 |
| DUP | Joseph Thompson* | 8.72% | 637 | 642.68 | 649.68 | 651.76 | 651.84 | 651.84 | 672.24 |
| UUP | John Scott* | 5.70% | 416 | 428.88 | 468.8 | 505.16 | 505.16 | 505.16 | |
| SDLP | Patrick Doherty* | 4.92% | 359 | 359.24 | 415.24 | 419.32 | | | |
| Alliance | James Muirhead | 3.93% | 287 | 292.04 | 298.44 | | | | |
| UUP | Samuel McKeown | 2.16% | 158 | 165.12 | | | | | |
| SDLP | Seamus O'Neill | 1.22% | 89 | 89.16 | | | | | |
Electorate: 14,998 Valid: 7,301 (48.68%) Spoilt: 220 Quota: 913 Turnout: 7,521 (50.15%)
