= 2025 Democratic Unionist Party deputy leadership election =

- 7 March 2025

31 MPs and MLAs 16 votes needed to win
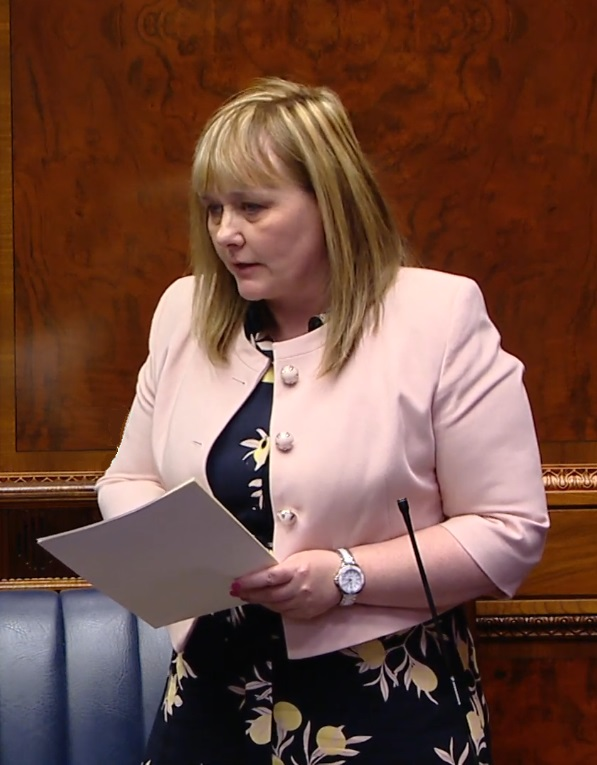
Candidate	Michelle McIlveen
Popular vote	Unopposed
Percentage	100%
Deputy Leader before election
vacant
Gavin Robinson (2024)
Elected Deputy Leader
Michelle McIlveen

The 2025 Democratic Unionist Party deputy leadership election was held on 7 March 2025 to fill the Deputy Leader position within the Democratic Unionist Party (DUP) which had been vacant since May 2024. Strangford MLA Michelle McIlveen was elected unopposed.

== Background ==
Belfast East MP Gavin Robinson was elected Deputy Leader of the DUP on 9 June 2023, defeating Upper Bann MLA Jonathan Buckley. Robinson became interim Leader of the Democratic Unionist Party following the resignation of Jeffrey Donaldson after being charged with historical sexual offences on 29 March 2024. In May 2024, Robinson was ratified as the party's permanent leader, vacating the deputy leadership.

== Procedure ==
Nominations closed on 3 March 2025 and the election took place by secret ballot on 7 March 2025. The party's Members of Parliament (MPs) and Members of the Legislative Assembly (MLAs) were able to vote.

== Candidates ==
=== Declared ===
Candidate	Born	Political office	Notes
Michelle McIlveen	21 January 1971 Newtownards, County Down, Northern Ireland	MLA for Strangford (since 2007)	McIlveen, a former Minister for Education and party veteran, could be a compromise candidate whom both wings of the party could agree on. She is seen as a “safe pair of hands” who would also ensure a gender balance in the leadership.

=== Declined ===
Candidate	Born	Political office	Notes
Jonathan Buckley	19 July 1991 County Armagh, Northern Ireland	MLA for Upper Bann (since 2017)	Buckley represents the more traditional wing of the party.
Emma Little-Pengelly	31 December 1979 Markethill, County Armagh, Northern Ireland	deputy First Minister of Northern Ireland (since 2024); MLA for Lagan Valley (since 2022)	Polling has found Little-Pengelly to be the most popular minister in the Executive.

== Results ==
DUP Chairman Lord Morrow announced that McIlveen was the only candidate nominated on 7 March 2025.

2025 Democratic Unionist Party deputy leadership election
Candidate	Nominated by
Michelle McIlveen	Gavin Robinson
