= Philip Smith (Northern Ireland politician) =

Northern Irish politician (born 1967)

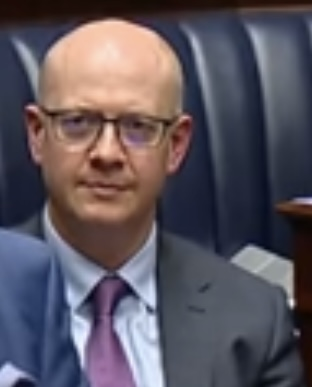
- Smith in 2016

Member of Ards and North Down Borough Council
- Incumbent
- Assumed office 2 May 2019
- Preceded by: James Fletcher
- Constituency: Comber

Member of the Legislative Assembly for Strangford
- In office May 2016 – 26 January 2017
- Preceded by: David McNarry
- Succeeded by: seat abolished

Member of Ards Borough Council
- In office 5 May 2011 – 22 May 2014
- Preceded by: Margaret Craig
- Succeeded by: Council abolished
- Constituency: Ards West
- In office 7 June 2001 – 5 May 2005
- Preceded by: David McNarry
- Succeeded by: Margaret Craig
- Constituency: Ards West

Personal details
- Born: 7 November 1967 (age 58)
- Party: Ulster Unionist Party
- Profession: Politician

Philip Smith (born 7 November 1967) is an Ulster Unionist Party (UUP) politician, serving as an Ards and North Down Councillor for the Comber DEA since 2019. He was a Member of the Northern Ireland Assembly (MLA) for Strangford from 2016 to 2017. Smith now works for Queen's University Belfast. He is a cofounder of the unionist campaign group Uniting UK.

== Career ==
Smith was first elected to Ards Borough Council in 2001, representing the Ards West District. He lost his seat in the 2005 election, but regained it at the 2011 local elections.

He was a candidate in the Comber DEA for the newly-formed Ards and North Down Borough Council in the 2014 election, but was unsuccessful.

In the 2016 Northern Ireland Assembly election, Smith was elected to the Assembly as one of two UUP representatives, the other being then Party leader, Mike Nesbitt. He failed to retain his seat at the 2017 Assembly election.

In the 2019 local elections, Smith was elected to Ards and North Down Borough Council, representing the Comber DEA.

Smith was the UUP candidate for Strangford during the 2019 UK general election. He came third.

In the 2022 Assembly election, Smith stood again for Strangford, but was eliminated on the third count.

He retained his council seat at the 2023 local elections.

Northern Ireland Assembly
Preceded by David McNarry	MLA for Strangford; 2016 – 2017	Seat abolished
