= Tom Benson (politician) =

Member of the Northern Ireland Assembly for Strangford
- In office 25 June 1998 – 24 December 2000
- Preceded by: New Creation
- Succeeded by: Thomas Hamilton

Member of Ards Borough Council
- In office 19 May 1993 – 7 June 2001
- Preceded by: New district
- Succeeded by: Terence Williams
- Constituency: Ards East
- In office 15 May 1985 – 19 May 1993
- Preceded by: New district
- Succeeded by: Thomas Hamilton
- Constituency: Newtownards

Northern Ireland Forum Member for Strangford
- In office 30 May 1996 – 25 April 1998
- Preceded by: New forum
- Succeeded by: Forum dissolved

Personal details
- Born: 26 August 1929 Enniskillen, Northern Ireland
- Died: 24 December 2000 (aged 71)
- Party: Ulster Unionist Party
- Spouse: Ann

Tom Benson (26 August 1929 – 24 December 2000) was an Ulster Unionist Party (UUP) politician who was a Member of the Northern Ireland Assembly (MLA) for Strangford from 1998 to 2000.

== Biography ==
Born in Enniskillen, Benson was an officer in the Royal Ulster Constabulary. He joined the Ulster Unionist Party (UUP) and was elected to Ards Borough Council, serving as Mayor of Ards from 1987–88. During this year, he defied a ban on UUP representatives meeting Government ministers and met the Secretary of State for Northern Ireland Tom King.

In 1996, Benson was elected to the Northern Ireland Forum representing Strangford, and he held his seat at the 1998 Northern Ireland Assembly election. He fell ill in November 2000 and died the following month. He was the first member of the Assembly to die, and was replaced by Thomas Hamilton, his hand-picked successor.

Northern Ireland Forum
New forum	Member for Strangford; 1996–1998	Forum dissolved
Northern Ireland Assembly
New assembly	MLA for Strangford; 1998–2000	Succeeded by Thomas Hamilton
