= Newtownards (District Electoral Area) =

District electoral area in Ards and North Down, Northern Ireland

- Ards and North Down Borough Council DEA constituency

Current constituency
- Created: 2014
- Seats: 7 (1985-1993); 6 (1993-2014); 7 (2014–)
- Councillors: Naomi Armstrong (DUP); Steven Irvine (IND); Colin Kennedy (DUP); Alan McDowell (APNI); Stephen McIlveen (DUP); Vicky Moore (APNI); Richard Smart (UUP)

Newtownards DEA within Ards and North Down

Newtownards DEA (1993-2014) within Ards

Newtownards is one of the seven district electoral areas (DEA) in Ards and North Down, Northern Ireland. The district elects five members to Ards and North Down Borough Council and contains the wards of Conway Square, Cronstown, Glen, Gregstown, Movilla, Scrabo and West Winds. Newtownards forms part of the Strangford constituencies for the Northern Ireland Assembly and UK Parliament.

It was created for the 1985 local elections, where it contained seven wards (Bradshaw's Brae, Central, Glen, Loughries, Movilla, Scrabo and Whitespots). For the 1993 local elections, it was reduced to six wards, gaining Ballyrainey but losing Loughries and Movilla to the new Ards East DEA. For the 2014 local elections, it returned to seven wards as Ards East was abolished.

== Councillors ==
Election	Councillor (Party)	Councillor (Party)	Councillor (Party)	Councillor (Party)	Councillor (Party)	Councillor (Party)	Councillor (Party)
2023	Alan McDowell (Alliance)	Vicky Moore (Alliance)	Richard Smart (UUP)	Steven Irvine (Independent)	Naomi Armstrong (DUP)	Stephen McIlveen (DUP)	Colin Kennedy (DUP)
May 2022 Co-Options	Alan McDowell (Alliance)	Vicky Moore (Alliance)	Richard Smart (UUP)	Steven Irvine (Independent)	Naomi Armstrong (DUP)	Stephen McIlveen (DUP)	Colin Kennedy (DUP)
2019	Alan McDowell (Alliance)	Nick Mathison (Alliance)	Richard Smart (UUP)	Jimmy Menagh (Independent)	Naomi Armstrong (DUP)	Stephen McIlveen (DUP)	Colin Kennedy (DUP)
2014	Alan McDowell (Alliance)	Katherine Ferguson (UUP)	Richard Smart (UUP)	Jimmy Menagh (Independent)	Naomi Armstrong (DUP)	Stephen McIlveen (DUP)	Colin Kennedy (DUP)
2011	Alan McDowell (Alliance)	Thomas Hamilton (UUP)	David Smyth (UUP)	Jimmy Menagh (Independent)	Naomi Armstrong (DUP)	Stephen McIlveen (DUP)	6 seats 1993-2014
2005	Alan McDowell (Alliance)	Thomas Hamilton (UUP)	David Smyth (UUP)	George Ennis (DUP)	Simon Hamilton (DUP)	Michelle McIlveen (DUP)	6 seats 1993-2014
2001	Alan McDowell (Alliance)	Thomas Hamilton (UUP)	David Smyth (UUP)	George Ennis (DUP)	Hamilton Lawther (DUP)	Wilbert Magill (DUP)/ (Independent Unionist)	6 seats 1993-2014
1997	Alan McDowell (Alliance)	Thomas Hamilton (UUP)	David Smyth (UUP)	George Ennis (DUP)	Bobby McBride (Independent Unionist)	Wilbert Magill (DUP)/ (Independent Unionist)	6 seats 1993-2014
1993	Alan McDowell (Alliance)	Thomas Hamilton (UUP)	David Smyth (UUP)	George Ennis (DUP)	Nancy Orr (Independent Unionist)	Wilbert Magill (DUP)/ (Independent Unionist)	6 seats 1993-2014
1989	Owen Dorrian (Alliance)	Thomas Benson (UUP)	David Smyth (UUP)	Simpson Gibson (DUP)	John Elliott (DUP)	Wilbert Magill (DUP)/ (Independent Unionist)	John Purdy (Independent Unionist)
1985	Owen Dorrian (Alliance)	Thomas Benson (UUP)	David Smyth (UUP)	Simpson Gibson (DUP)	John Elliott (DUP)	William Gilmore (DUP)	Robert Gaw (NILP)

== 2023 Election ==
2019: 3 x DUP, 2 x Alliance, 1 x UUP, 1 x Independent

2023: 3 x DUP, 2 x Alliance, 1 x UUP, 1 x Independent

2019–2023 Change: No change

Newtownards - 7 seats
Party	Candidate	FPv%	Count							
Party	Candidate	FPv%	1	2	3	4	5	6	7	8
Independent	Steven Irvine*	15.76%	1,463							
DUP	Naomi Armstrong*	14.75%	1,370							
UUP	Richard Smart*	13.54%	1,257							
Alliance	Alan McDowell*	13.31%	1,236							
DUP	Stephen McIlveen*	11.38%	1,057	1,111.78	1,154.98	1,161.98				
Alliance	Vicky Moore*	10.20%	947	959.32	961.42	1,126.21	1,159.33	1,230.97		
DUP	Colin Kennedy*	6.25%	580	628.4	764.75	768.49	797.83	798.25	801.43	981.25
TUV	Eddie Allen	6.44%	598	670.16	681.26	686.68	700.36	700.72	702.4	872.68
Independent	Ian Cox	5.68%	527	618.3	625.5	672.21	685.08	685.56	701.16	
Green (NI)	Maurice Macartney	2.43%	226	233.04	234.39					
Independent	Ben King	0.26%	24	36.54	36.84					
Electorate: 21,723 Valid: 9,285 (42.74%) Spoilt: 167 Quota: 1,161 Turnout: 9,452 (43.51%)

== 2019 Election ==
2014: 3 x DUP, 2 x UUP, 1 x Alliance, 1 x Independent

2019: 3 x DUP, 2 x Alliance, 1 x UUP, 1 x Independent

2014-2019 Change: Alliance gain from UUP

Newtownards - 7 seats
Party	Candidate	FPv%	Count						
Party	Candidate	FPv%	1	2	3	4	5	6	7
Independent	Jimmy Menagh* †	25.63%	2,138						
DUP	Naomi Armstrong*	14.77%	1,232						
Alliance	Nick Mathison †	13.08%	1,091						
DUP	Stephen McIlveen*	10.77%	898	1,127.1					
DUP	Colin Kennedy –	6.83%	570	771.84	919.59	924.07	988.03	1,055.03	
UUP	Richard Smart*	8.82%	736	964.52	970.97	979.45	986.99	1,040.12	1,076.12
Alliance	Alan McDowell*	6.88%	574	668.54	670.19	678.83	679.87	696.66	977.61
UUP	Ian Dickson	5.77%	481	585.98	599.78	602.09	607.29	677.47	734.16
Green (NI)	Maurice Macartney	4.49%	374	448.82	450.47	466.01	467.05	503.97	
UKIP	Paul Corry	2.67%	223	341.32	348.07	358.34	361.2		
Independent	Ben King	0.29%	24	61.12	61.42				
Electorate: 20,491 Valid: 8,341 (40.71%) Spoilt: 138 Quota: 1,043 Turnout: 8,479 (41.38%)

== 2014 Election ==
This election was carried out under new ward boundaries, as a result of local government reform.

2011: 2 x DUP, 2 x UUP, 1 x Alliance, 1 x Independent

2014: 3 x DUP, 2 x UUP, 1 x Alliance, 1 x Independent

2011-2014: DUP gain due to the addition of one seat

Newtownards - 7 seats
Party	Candidate	FPv%	Count								
Party	Candidate	FPv%	1	2	3	4	5	6	7	8	9
Independent	James Menagh*	18.06%	1,464								
DUP	Naomi Armstrong*	12.94%	1,049								
DUP	Stephen McIlveen*	10.23%	829	900.4	907.75	910.3	931.46	946.89	1,016.34		
DUP	Colin Kennedy*	6.82%	553	585.2	591.2	593.6	607.35	618.73	665.55	1,030.55	
Alliance	Alan McDowell*	6.64%	538	554.8	567.15	567.42	578.82	631.22	653.02	659.17	1,074.17
UUP	Richard Smart	7.88%	639	683.1	705.8	706.25	725.35	751.1	807.56	836.74	864.79
UUP	Katherine Ferguson	7.34%	595	631.05	659.10	660.24	681.12	714.9	759.1	811.18	855.85
TUV	David McMullen	6.44%	522	559.8	570.5	570.95	586.4	602.48	647.68	679.45	689.53
Alliance	Linda Cleland*	6.11%	495	512.85	515.85	516.51	530.96	588.66	623.36	634.13	
DUP	John Elliott*	5.72%	464	508.45	512.45	534.26	555.77	565.56	611.51		
Independent	Ian Cox	4.74%	384	470.45	471.45	472.11	542.34	559.39			
NI21	Nichola Keenan	3.10%	251	263.25	274.25	274.49	288.19				
Independent	Sharon Hunt	2.54%	206	250.8	253.8	254.01					
NI Conservatives	William McKendry	1.46%	118	121.85							
Electorate: 19,953 Valid: 8,107 (40.63%) Spoilt: 143 Quota: 1,014 Turnout: 8,250 (41.35%)

== 2011 Election ==
2005: 3 x DUP, 2 x UUP, 1 x Alliance

2011: 2 x DUP, 2 x UUP, 1 x Alliance, 1 x Independent

2005-2011 Change: Independent gain from DUP

Newtownards - 6 seats
Party	Candidate	FPv%	Count			
Party	Candidate	FPv%	1	2	3	4
DUP	Naomi Armstrong	18.31%	979			
Alliance	Alan McDowell*	16.51%	883			
DUP	Stephen McIlveen	14.72%	787			
Independent	Jimmy Menagh	14.29%	764	772.14		
UUP	Thomas Hamilton*	10.45%	559	573.96	671.06	713.78
UUP	David Smyth*	10.53%	563	567.84	654.94	711.1
DUP	Charlie Simmons	7.82%	418	589.16	639.24	657.96
TUV	Hamilton Lawther	3.42%	183	186.96		
Independent	Ken Richardson	2.30%	123	124.54		
SDLP	Gerard Lennon	1.66%	89	90.32		
Electorate: 12,092 Valid: 5,348 (44.23%) Spoilt: 119 Quota: 765 Turnout: 5,467 (45.21%)

== 2005 Election ==
2001: 2 x DUP, 2 x UUP, 1 x Alliance, 1 x Independent

2005: 3 x DUP, 2 x UUP, 1 x Alliance

2001-2005 Change: DUP gain from Independent

Newtownards - 6 seats
Party	Candidate	FPv%	Count			
Party	Candidate	FPv%	1	2	3	4
DUP	George Ennis*	22.66%	1,296			
Alliance	Alan McDowell*	14.39%	823			
DUP	Simon Hamilton	8.57%	490	840.76		
DUP	Michelle McIlveen	10.89%	623	652.23	1,005.23	
UUP	Thomas Hamilton*	12.87%	736	766.34	820.7	
UUP	David Smyth*	11.38%	651	660.62	688.91	774.91
Independent	Wilbert Magill*	10.56%	604	617.69	668.09	716.09
DUP	Hamilton Lawther*	8.67%	496	536.33		
Electorate: 11,945 Valid: 5,719 (47.88%) Spoilt: 130 Quota: 818 Turnout: 5,849 (48.97%)

== 2001 Election ==
1997: 2 x UUP, 2 x Independent Unionist, 1 x DUP, 1 x Alliance

2001: 2 x DUP, 2 x UUP, 1 x Alliance, 1 x Independent

1997-2001 Change: DUP gain from Independent Unionist, Independent Unionist becomes Independent

Newtownards - 6 seats
Party	Candidate	FPv%	Count				
Party	Candidate	FPv%	1	2	3	4	5
DUP	George Ennis*	22.81%	1,608				
UUP	Thomas Hamilton*	18.27%	1,288				
UUP	David Smyth*	15.04%	1,060				
Independent	Wilbert Magill*	12.61%	889	923.2	1,043.2		
Alliance	Alan McDowell*	12.18%	859	863.94	915.32	1,075.9	
DUP	Hamilton Lawther	5.15%	363	838	877.14	944.41	967.66
DUP	Bobby McBride*	9.52%	671	734.46	779.5	830.96	852.04
Independent	Nancy Orr	4.43%	312	322.66			
Electorate: 12,965 Valid: 7,050 (54.38%) Spoilt: 218 Quota: 1,008 Turnout: 7,268 (56.06%)

== 1997 Election ==
1993: 2 x UUP, 2 x DUP, 1 x Alliance, 1 x Independent Unionist

1997: 2 x DUP, 2 x Independent Unionist, 1 x DUP, 1 x Alliance

1993-1997 Change: Independent Unionist gain from DUP

Newtownards - 6 seats
Party	Candidate	FPv%	Count								
Party	Candidate	FPv%	1	2	3	4	5	6	7	8	9
Ind. Unionist	Wilbert Magill*	19.41%	914								
Alliance	Alan McDowell*	15.37%	724								
UUP	David Smyth*	14.65%	690								
DUP	George Ennis*	10.89%	653	692.44							
UUP	Thomas Hamilton*	12.00%	565	628.22	635.8	651.6	656.36	666.68	728.68		
Ind. Unionist	Bobby McBride	6.92%	326	377.33	382.33	388.83	391.38	391.78	426.07	507.6	534.6
Ind. Unionist	Nancy Orr*	7.15%	337	393.26	407.42	430.62	433.68	434.68	461.61	503.67	510.67
DUP	John Purdy	4.78%	225	238.63	245.08	246.28	253.76	254.62	305.39		
PUP	Alfred McCrory	4.69%	221	231.15	245.15	249.45	250.47	250.73			
Ulster Democratic	Billy McKeown	1.17%	55	59.93							
Electorate: 12,942 Valid: 4,710 (36.39%) Spoilt: 120 Quota: 673 Turnout: 4,830 (37.32%)

== 1993 Election ==
1989: 3 x DUP, 2 x DUP, 1 x Alliance, 1 x Independent Unionist

1993: 2 x UUP, 2 x DUP, 1 x Alliance, 1 x Independent Unionist

1989-1993 Change: DUP loss due to the reduction of one seat

Newtownards - 6 seats
Party	Candidate	FPv%	Count			
Party	Candidate	FPv%	1	2	3	4
UUP	David Smyth*	17.55%	817			
Alliance	Alan McDowell	16.49%	768			
Ind. Unionist	Nancy Orr	13.70%	638	645.56	695.56	
UUP	Thomas Hamilton	9.84%	458	551.24	631.1	677.79
DUP	Wilbert Magill*	11.90%	554	567.32	657.3	663.51
DUP	George Ennis	11.71%	545	549.32	634.22	638.59
UUP	Bobby McBride*	10.74%	500	513.68	546.02	588.34
DUP	John Purdy*	4.60%	214	217.24		
NI Conservatives	Andrew Thompson	3.48%	162	171		
Electorate: 12,647 Valid: 4,656 (36.82%) Spoilt: 141 Quota: 666 Turnout: 4,797 (37.93%)

== 1989 Election ==
1985: 3 x DUP, 2 x UUP, 1 x Alliance, 1 x NILP

1989: 3 x DUP, 2 x UUP, 1 x Alliance, 1 x Independent Unionist

1985-1989 Change: Independent Unionist gain from NILP

Newtownards - 7 seats
Party	Candidate	FPv%	Count								
Party	Candidate	FPv%	1	2	3	4	5	6	7	8	9
UUP	Thomas Benson*	20.60%	1,307								
DUP	Simpson Gibson*	20.22%	1,283								
Alliance	Owen Dorrian*	11.33%	719	757	763.08	770.08	964.08				
DUP	Wilbert Magill	8.64%	548	565.6	679.98	686.38	686.38	687.38	799.54		
DUP	John Elliott*	6.43%	408	450.4	625.2	633.1	633.48	634.48	785.14	906.14	
UUP	David Smyth*	7.12%	452	544	565.66	625.38	628.18	671.18	699.68	794.68	
Ind. Unionist	John Purdy	7.45%	473	485.4	496.04	503.22	511.82	578.82	585.74	682.36	697.36
UUP	Thomas Hamilton	2.88%	183	430.6	449.22	482.58	489.58	525.58	535.06	603.58	636.58
Ind. Unionist	William Hannigan	6.84%	434	449.6	473.92	478.72	481.12	490.12	504.1		
DUP	Cedric Wilson	3.59%	228	236.4	339.38	340.18	342.58	343.58			
Alliance	Laurence Thompson	3.36%	213	218.2	218.58	221.58					
UUP	James McKernon	1.54%	98	130.8	136.12						
Electorate: 16,907 Valid: 6,346 (37.53%) Spoilt: 175 Quota: 794 Turnout: 6,521 (38.57%)

== 1985 Election ==
1985: 3 x DUP, 2 x UUP, 1 x NILP, 1 x Alliance

Newtownards - 7 seats
Party	Candidate	FPv%	Count									
Party	Candidate	FPv%	1	2	3	4	5	6	7	8	9	10
DUP	Simpson Gibson*	22.50%	1,596									
NI Labour	Robert Gaw*	16.30%	1,156									
DUP	John Elliott*	14.47%	1,026									
UUP	Thomas Benson	13.96%	990									
Alliance	Owen Dorrian*	7.74%	549	568.8	638.64	640.07	645.07	666.67	848.2	1,002.2		
UUP	David Smyth	7.29%	517	552.1	595.06	597.79	613.79	641.15	656.35	665.87	678.87	922.87
DUP	William Gilmore	3.41%	242	701.9	741.26	845.65	852.15	859.57	860.63	866.49	869.49	891.94
DUP	Joseph Patterson	3.95%	280	425.35	443.83	458.39	460.79	467.97	470.45	472.65	473.65	489.95
UUP	David Jeffers	3.34%	237	263.1	301.5	307.48	369.38	412.86	420.88	427.76	443.76	
Labour Party NI	Hugh McMullan	2.65%	188	190.25	217.85	217.98	218.18	230.86	235.34			
Alliance	Laurence Thompson	2.82%	200	201.8	214.76	215.15	215.95	219.29				
UUP	James McKernon	1.07%	76	84.1	89.38	90.94	95.24					
Ulster Liberal	Michael McGuigan	0.49%	35	36.35	40.43	40.43	40.83					
Electorate: 15,487 Valid: 7,092 (45.79%) Spoilt: 157 Quota: 887 Turnout: 7,249 (46.81%)
