= Ards East (District Electoral Area) =

District electoral areas in Ards, Northern Ireland

Ards East DEA (1993-2014) within Ards

Ards East was one of the four district electoral areas in Ards, Northern Ireland which existed from 1993 to 2014. The district elected six members to Ards Borough Council and formed part of the North Down constituencies for the Northern Ireland Assembly and UK Parliament, and part of the Strangford constituencies for the Northern Ireland Assembly and UK Parliament.

It was created for the 1993 local elections, and contained the wards of Donaghadee North, Donaghadee South, Gregstown, Loughries, Millisle and Movilla. It was abolished for the 2014 local elections and replaced by the Bangor East and Donaghadee DEA and Newtownards DEA.

== Councillors ==
Election	Councillor (Party)	Councillor (Party)	Councillor (Party)	Councillor (Party)	Councillor (Party)	Councillor (Party)
2011	Linda Cleland (Alliance)	Ronald Ferguson (UUP)	Tom Smith (DUP)	Eddie Thompson (DUP)	John Elliott (DUP)	Hamilton Gregory (DUP)
2005	Jeffrey Magill (UUP)/ (DUP)	Ronald Ferguson (UUP)	Jonathan Bell (DUP)	Terence Williams (DUP)	John Elliott (DUP)	Hamilton Gregory (DUP)
2001	Jeffrey Magill (UUP)/ (DUP)	Ronald Ferguson (UUP)	Linda Cleland (Alliance)	Terence Williams (DUP)	John Shields (UUP)	Hamilton Gregory (DUP)
1997	Jeffrey Magill (UUP)/ (DUP)	Ronald Ferguson (UUP)	Linda Cleland (Alliance)	Thomas Benson (UUP)	John Shields (UUP)	Hamilton Gregory (DUP)
1993	Jeffrey Magill (UUP)/ (DUP)	Ronald Ferguson (UUP)	Laurence Thompson (Alliance)	Thomas Benson (UUP)	John Shields (UUP)	St Clair McAlister (DUP)

== 2011 Election ==
2005: 4 x DUP, 2 x UUP

2011: 4 x DUP, 1 x UUP, 1 x Alliance

2005-2011 Change: Alliance gain from UUP

Ards East - 6 seats
Party	Candidate	FPv%	Count							
Party	Candidate	FPv%	1	2	3	4	5	6	7	8
DUP	Colville Elliott*	20.05%	1,353							
Alliance	Linda Cleland	16.21%	1,094							
DUP	Hamilton Gregory*	14.11%	952	1,168.92						
DUP	Tom Smith	14.26%	962	1,082.93						
DUP	Eddie Thompson	9.19%	620	633.92	818.94	831.12	946.25	953.67	978.67	
UUP	Ronald Ferguson*	9.23%	623	632.57	636.34	649.64	649.93	654.91	675.39	765.23
UUP	Katherine Ferguson	7.78%	525	540.95	543.85	572.69	572.98	580.36	620.45	694.57
TUV	Terence Williams*	4.51%	304	306.61	310.38	318.22	318.8	321.08	347	
Green (NI)	Emer Hopkins	2.83%	191	193.03	193.9	236.18	236.18	311.26		
SDLP	Moira Ritchie	1.82%	123	123.87	125.61	147.45	147.74			
Electorate: 16,004 Valid: 6,747 (42.16%) Spoilt: 165 Quota: 965 Turnout: 6,912 (43.19%)

== 2005 Election ==
2001: 3 x UUP, 2 x DUP, 1 x Alliance

2005: 4 x DUP, 2 x UUP

2001-2005 Change: DUP gain (two seats) from UUP and Alliance

Ards East - 6 seats
Party	Candidate	FPv%	Count					
Party	Candidate	FPv%	1	2	3	4	5	6
DUP	Jonathan Bell	19.92%	1,515					
DUP	Terence Williams*	13.07%	994	1,097.6				
DUP	John Elliott*	10.70%	814	1,060.68	1,081.52	1,099.52		
UUP	Ronald Ferguson*	13.05%	993	1,006.72	1,056.56	1,247.56		
DUP	Hamilton Gregory*	12.40%	943	977.16	1,000.44	1,038.52	1,054.36	1,063.96
UUP	Jeffrey Magill*	8.20%	624	628.2	650.2	942.88	1,062.67	1,063.63
Alliance	Linda Cleland*	11.17%	850	858.68	959.96	1,012.08	1,036.83	1,038.75
UUP	Tom Smith	7.36%	560	566.72	633.28			
Green (NI)	John McCullough	2.39%	182	183.4				
Independent	Thomas Sheridan	1.74%	132	134.8				
Electorate: 15,367 Valid: 7,607 (49.50%) Spoilt: 181 Quota: 1,087 Turnout: 7,788 (50.68%)

== 2001 Election ==
1997: 4 x UUP, 1 x UUP, 1 x Alliance

2001: 3 x DUP, 2 x DUP, 1 x Alliance

1997-2001 Change: DUP gain from UUP

Ards East - 6 seats
Party	Candidate	FPv%	Count
Party	Candidate	FPv%	1
Alliance	Linda Cleland*	N/A	N/A
UUP	Ronald Ferguson*	N/A	N/A
DUP	Hamilton Gregory*	N/A	N/A
UUP	Jeffrey Magill*	N/A	N/A
UUP	John Shields*	N/A	N/A
DUP	Terence Williams	N/A	N/A
Electorate: N/A Valid: N/A Spoilt: N/A Quota: N/A Turnout: N/A

- As only six candidates had been nominated for six seats, there was no vote in Ards East and all six candidates were deemed elected.

== 1997 Election ==
1993: 3 x UUP, 2 x DUP, 1 x Alliance

1997: 4 x UUP, 1 x DUP, 1 x Alliance

1993-1997 Change: UUP gain from DUP

Ards East - 6 seats
Party	Candidate	FPv%	Count							
Party	Candidate	FPv%	1	2	3	4	5	6	7	8
UUP	Thomas Benson*	17.40%	882							
UUP	Ronald Ferguson*	13.33%	676	762.4						
DUP	Hamilton Gregory	12.25%	621	628.2	629.53	656.71	811.71			
UUP	John Shields*	11.95%	606	618.24	622.44	656.62	668.05	668.64	752.64	
Alliance	Linda Cleland	8.24%	418	422.32	422.53	437.71	441.71	442.89	462.07	792.07
UUP	Jeffrey Magill*	9.47%	480	508.98	533.69	582.23	616.56	621.87	680.76	694.05
DUP	St Clair McAlister*	5.82%	295	299.32	299.95	309.95	369.2	447.67	509.28	518.64
Alliance	Laurence Thompson*	6.94%	352	355.06	355.48	363.48	363.48	363.48	378.66	
UK Unionist	Thomas Sheridan	5.31%	269	271.16	271.93	283.93	287.93	287.93		
DUP	Hamilton Lawther	4.95%	251	254.96	255.87	274.87				
PUP	Georgina McCrory	4.34%	220	221.26	221.33					
Electorate: 14,904 Valid: 5,070 (34.02%) Spoilt: 114 Quota: 725 Turnout: 5,184 (34.78%)

== 1993 Election ==
1993: 3 x UUP, 2 x DUP, 1 x Alliance

Ards East - 6 seats
Party	Candidate	FPv%	Count		
Party	Candidate	FPv%	1	2	3
UUP	Thomas Benson*	19.85%	956		
DUP	Jeffrey Magill	17.99%	866		
UUP	John Shields*	15.39%	741		
Alliance	Laurence Thompson	14.97%	721		
UUP	Ronald Ferguson	10.49%	505	730.3	
DUP	St Clair McAlister	13.73%	661	686.2	851.8
NI Conservatives	Gavin Walker	7.58%	365	382.1	389.46
Electorate: 13,490 Valid: 4,815 (35.69%) Spoilt: 120 Quota: 688 Turnout: 4,935 (36.58%)
