= George Ennis =

Northern Irish Unionist politician

Member of Ards Borough Council
- In office 19 May 1993 – 5 May 2011
- Preceded by: Simpson Gibson
- Succeeded by: Jimmy Menagh
- Constituency: Newtownards

Member of the Northern Ireland Assembly for Strangford
- In office 26 November 2003 – 7 March 2007
- Preceded by: Cedric Wilson
- Succeeded by: Simon Hamilton

Personal details
- Born: 9 February 1953 (age 73) Greyabbey, Northern Ireland
- Party: Traditional Unionist Voice (2009 - present)
- Other political affiliations: Democratic Unionist Party (Until 2007); UK Unionist Party (2007)

Alderman George Ennis (born 9 February 1953) is a former Northern Irish Unionist politician who was a Democratic Unionist Party (DUP) Member of the Northern Ireland Assembly (MLA) for Strangford from 2003 to 2007.

== Background ==
Ennis was first elected to Ards (borough) in 1993 and was Mayor of Ards in 1998–1999.

Ennis was elected to the Northern Ireland Assembly in 2003 for the constituency of Strangford for the DUP.

In February 2007, Ennis defected from the DUP to the UK Unionist Party (UKUP). He stood for the Strangford seat on a UKUP ticket but lost his seat. Following the demise of UKUP, Ennis sat as an independent councillor in Ards before joining the Traditional Unionist Voice (TUV) on 15 September 2009.

He is Vice Chair of the Northern Ireland Building Regulations Council, a board member of SEELB and Chair of the Northern Ireland Strategic Waste Partnership.

Ennis is a member of the Greenwell Street Presbyterian Church.

Northern Ireland Assembly
Preceded by Cedric Wilson	MLA for Strangford; 2003–2007	Succeeded by Simon Hamilton
