= Kieran McCarthy (Northern Ireland politician) =

British politician (born 1942)

Member of the Northern Ireland Assembly for Strangford
- In office 25 June 1998 – 30 March 2016
- Preceded by: New Creation
- Succeeded by: Kellie Armstrong

Member of Ards Borough Council
- In office 15 May 1985 – 22 May 2014
- Preceded by: District created
- Succeeded by: Council abolished
- Constituency: Ards Peninsula

Northern Ireland Forum Member for Strangford
- In office 30 May 1996 – 25 April 1998
- Preceded by: Forum created
- Succeeded by: Forum dissolved

Personal details
- Born: 9 September 1942 (age 83) Newtownards, Northern Ireland
- Party: Alliance
- Spouse: Kathleen McCarthy

Kieran McCarthy (born 9 September 1942) is a retired Alliance Party of Northern Ireland (APNI) politician. From 1998 to 2016 he was a member of the Northern Ireland Assembly for Strangford. He served as Assembly chief whip for APNI in the Assembly.

== Background ==
McCarthy was born in Newtownards and worked as a draper. In 1985 he was first elected to Ards Borough Council. In 1990 he became a Justice of the Peace. He was then elected to the Northern Ireland Peace Forum in 1996 from Strangford and has subsequently won a Northern Ireland Assembly seat there in all three elections to that body. In the 2007 elections his seat was targeted by the Social Democratic and Labour Party (SDLP), but he won easily with a significantly increased vote.

He has stated his appreciation for the Good Friday Agreement on a number of occasions but believes a more party-aligned/devolved agreement would work more effectively.

McCarthy has stated his strong dislike for Direct Rule, causing a major democratic deficit, and in particular, was against the supposedly aggressive style of governing from the then Secretary of State for Northern Ireland, Peter Hain.

Northern Ireland Forum
New forum	Member for Strangford; 1996–1998	Forum dissolved
Northern Ireland Assembly
New assembly	MLA for Strangford; 1998–2016	Succeeded by Kellie Armstrong
