= Tom Hamilton (politician) =

Mayor of Ards
- In office 2000–2001

Deputy mayor of Ards
- In office 1999–2000

Member of Ards Borough Council
- In office 19 May 1993 – 22 May 2014
- Preceded by: Tom Benson
- Succeeded by: Council abolished
- Constituency: Newtownards

Member of the Northern Ireland Assembly for Strangford
- In office January 2001 – 26 November 2003
- Preceded by: Tom Benson
- Succeeded by: David McNarry

Personal details
- Born: 8 July 1954 (age 71) Belfast, Northern Ireland
- Party: Ulster Unionist Party
- Occupation: Politician

Tom Hamilton (born 8 July 1954) is an Ulster Unionist Party (UUP) politician who was a Member of the Northern Ireland Assembly (MLA) for Strangford from 2000 to 2003.

== Background ==
Born in Belfast, Hamilton studied at the Methodist College, Belfast, then at Stranmillis College. He became a teacher and in 1993 was elected to Ards Borough Council as an Ulster Unionist Party (UUP) member. From 1999, he served as Deputy Mayor, then from 2000 to 2001 as Mayor of Ards.

Hamilton stood in the 1998 Northern Ireland Assembly election, in Strangford. Although unsuccessful, he was co-opted in January 2001, following the death of fellow UUP member Tom Benson. He did not defend his seat in 2003.

Northern Ireland Assembly
| Preceded by Tom Benson | MLA for Strangford; 2001–2003 | Succeeded by David McNarry |
