= Ards (borough) =

District of Northern Ireland (1973–2015)

Coordinates: 54.521°N 5.747°W

Ards Borough
- Area: 376 km^{2} (145 sq mi); Ranked 20th of 26
- District HQ: Newtownards
- Catholic: 12.7%
- Protestant: 76.9%
- Country: Northern Ireland
- Sovereign state: United Kingdom
- Councillors: MLAs DUP: 6 UUP: 2 Alliance Party: 2 UKIP: 1 Green Party: 1; MPs Stephen Farry (Alliance Party) Jim Shannon (DUP)
- Website: www.ards-council.gov.uk

Ards (named after the Ards Peninsula) was a local government district in Northern Ireland with the status of borough. It was one of twenty-six districts formed on 1 October 1973, and had its headquarters in Newtownards. It was merged with neighbouring North Down on 1 May 2015 to form the new Borough of Ards and North Down. Other towns in the defunct Borough included Portaferry, Comber, and Donaghadee, and the population of the area was 78,078 according to the 2011 census.

Strangford Lough is at the heart of the area, and is the largest inlet in Ireland with internationally renowned wildlife. The Irish Sea coast stretches from Donaghadee to Portaferry. Mount Stewart, a National Trust property on the shore of Strangford Lough, is in the area, as well as Northern Ireland's only aquarium, Exploris, in Portaferry and Grace Neill's pub in Donaghadee.

== Borough council ==
The borough was governed by Ards Borough Council (Ulster-Scots: Burgh Cooncil o' the Airds, Newton an' Blathewick). The borough was divided into four district electoral areas: Newtownards, Ards West, Ards East and Ards Peninsula, from which 23 members were elected. As of February 2011 the following parties were represented on the council: 11 Democratic Unionist Party (DUP), 6 Ulster Unionist Party (UUP), 4 Alliance Party, and 1 Social Democratic and Labour Party (SDLP), and there was 1 Independent councillor. The next election was due to take place in May 2009, but on 25 April 2008, Shaun Woodward, Secretary of State for Northern Ireland announced that the scheduled 2009 district council elections were to be postponed until the introduction of the eleven new councils in 2011. The proposed reforms were abandoned in 2010, and district council elections took place in 2011

=== Mayor of Ards ===
On creation in 1973 Ards District Council adopted the charter of incorporation of the municipal borough of Newtownards, to become Ards Borough Council. The charter also granted the chairman of the council the title "Mayor of Ards".

Year	Name	Political affiliation	Deputy	Deputy's affiliation
1973–75	John Algie	UUP	D. Hamilton	UUP
1975–77	Henry Cosbey	UUP	J. B. Caughey	Independent
1977–79	John Scott	UUP	Hamilton McKeag	UUP
1979–81	Hamilton McKeag	UUP	Robert Gaw	NI Labour
1981–83	Robert Gaw	NI Labour	Jim McBriar	Alliance
1983–84	Jim McBriar	Alliance	Oliver Johnston	DUP
1984–85	Oliver Johnston	DUP	Gladys McIntyre	UPUP
1985–86	Gladys McIntyre	UPUP	Robert Ambrose	UUP
1986–87	Robert Ambrose	UUP	Simpson Gibson	DUP
1987–88	Simpson Gibson	DUP	Tom Benson	UUP
1988–89	Tom Benson	UUP	John Hamilton	DUP
1989–1990	John Hamilton	DUP	Robert Gibson	UUP
1990–91	Robert Gibson	UUP	Jim Shannon	DUP
1991–92	Jim Shannon	DUP	David Smyth	UUP
1992–93	David Smyth	UUP	Wilbert Magill	DUP
1993–94	Wilbert Magill	DUP	John Shields	UUP
1994–95	John Shields	UUP	St Clair McAlister	DUP
1995–96	St Clair McAlister	DUP	Robert Gibson	UUP
June – December 1996	Robert Gibson	UUP	Ronnie Ferguson	UUP
January – June 1998	Ronnie Ferguson	UUP	George Ennis	DUP
June 1998 – June 1999	George Ennis	DUP	Alan McDowell	Alliance
1999–2000	Alan McDowell	Alliance	Tom Hamilton	UUP
2000–01	Tom Hamilton	UUP	Margaret Craig	DUP
2001–02	Margaret Craig	DUP	Jeff Magill	UUP
2002–03	Jeff Magill	UUP	Jim McBriar	Alliance
2003–04	Jim McBriar	Alliance	Hamilton Gregory	DUP
2004–05	Hamilton Gregory	DUP	Angus Carson	UUP
2005–06	Terry Williams	DUP	Angus Carson	UUP
2006–07	Angus Carson	UUP	Robin Drysdale	DUP
2007–08	Robin Drysdale	DUP	Jim Fletcher	UUP
2008–09	Jim Fletcher	UUP	William Montgomery	DUP
2009–10	William Montgomery	DUP	David Smyth	UUP
2010–11	David Smyth	UUP	Mervyn Oswald	DUP
2011–12	Mervyn Oswald	DUP	Hamilton Gregory	DUP
2012–2013	Hamilton Gregory	DUP	Stephen McIlveen	DUP

2013 Stephen McIlveen Democratic Unionist Party

Source: Freedom of Information request to Ards Borough Council

== Parliamentary and assembly representation ==
In elections for the Westminster Parliament and Northern Ireland Assembly most of the borough was included in the Strangford constituency, with part (Donaghadee North, Donaghadee South and Millisle) in the North Down constituency.

== Town twinning ==
The borough of Ards had a sister city (twinning) relationship with the city of Peoria, Arizona, USA. As a result of this relationship, regular exchange visits were made between the two communities by artists, educators, business, political and community leaders.

== See also ==
- Local government in Northern Ireland
