= Ards Borough Council =

Local authority in Northern Ireland

Type
- Type: District Council of Ards (borough)

Ards Borough Council was the local authority of Ards in Northern Ireland. It merged with North Down Borough Council in May 2015 under local government reorganisation in Northern Ireland to become North Down and Ards District Council.

== Members ==
Map of the borough's DEAs from 1993 to 2014

Ards Borough Council was sub-divided into four electoral areas: Ards East, Ards Peninsula, Ards West, and Newtownards, from which 23 members were elected. In the last election to the former Council in February 2011, the following political parties were represented: 11 Democratic Unionist Party, 6 Ulster Unionist Party, 4 Alliance, 1 Social Democratic and Labour Party and 1 independent. Elections were held using the proportional representation system.

== Population ==
The area covered by Ards Borough Council had a population of 78,078 residents according to the 2011 Northern Ireland census.
