= 7th Northern Ireland Assembly =

Northern Ireland MLAs 2022 to present

←	6th Assembly

Overview
- Legislative body: Assembly
- Jurisdiction: Northern Ireland
- Meeting place: Parliament Buildings, Stormont
- Term: 5 May 2022 – present
- Election: 2022 Assembly election
- Government: Executive of the 7th Assembly
- Members: 90
- Speaker: Edwin Poots
- First Minister: Michelle O'Neill
- Deputy First Minister: Emma Little-Pengelly

This is a list of the 90 members of the seventh Northern Ireland Assembly, the unicameral devolved legislature of Northern Ireland. The election took place on 5 May 2022, with counting continuing the following 2 days; voter turnout was estimated at 64.4%.

Five MLAs were elected from each of the 18 constituencies. Sinn Féin became the biggest party for the first time, entitling them to the First Minister. Additionally, Alliance, the biggest cross-community party, also had a big increase, overtaking the SDLP and UUP in votes to become third in the assembly, following the DUP, the biggest Unionist party.

The DUP blocked the formation of an Executive until a meeting of the Assembly on 3 February 2024.

== Party strengths ==
Party		Designation	Elected	Current
●	Sinn Féin	Nationalist	27	27
●	Democratic Unionist Party	Unionist	25	25
●	Alliance Party of Northern Ireland	Other	17	17
●	Ulster Unionist Party	Unionist	9	8
♦	Social Democratic and Labour Party	Nationalist	8	8
	Independent Unionist	Unionist	2	2
	Traditional Unionist Voice	Unionist	1	1
	People Before Profit	Other	1	1
	Independent Nationalist	Nationalist	0	0
	Speaker (Note: Once elected, the Speaker relinquishes their party affiliation.)	None	0	1
Totals by Designation		Unionist	37	36
Totals by Designation		Nationalist	35	35
Totals by Designation		Other	18	18
Totals by Designation		None	0	1
Total			90	
● = Northern Ireland Executive; ♦ = Official Opposition

=== Graphical representation ===
Party Composition following the 2022 Election

Designations of the Assembly after the 2022 Election. Unionists in Orange, Nationalists in Green and "Others" in Yellow

Parties arranged roughly on the nationalist-unionist spectrum

== MLAs by current affiliation ==
Party	Name	Constituency	Member since
Sinn Féin (27)	Caoimhe Archibald	East Londonderry	5 May 2016
Sinn Féin (27)	Danny Baker	Belfast West	5 May 2022
Sinn Féin (27)	Paul Boggs	West Tyrone	1 September 2026
Sinn Féin (27)	Nicola Brogan	West Tyrone	31 October 2020
Sinn Féin (27)	Cathal Boylan	Newry and Armagh	7 March 2007
Sinn Féin (27)	Pádraig Delargy	Foyle	13 September 2021
Sinn Féin (27)	Linda Dillon	Mid Ulster	5 May 2016
Sinn Féin (27)	Jemma Dolan	Fermanagh and South Tyrone	2 March 2017
Sinn Féin (27)	Sinéad Ennis	South Down	2 March 2017
Sinn Féin (27)	Ciara Ferguson	Foyle	13 September 2021
Sinn Féin (27)	Órlaithí Flynn	Belfast West	7 December 2016
Sinn Féin (27)	Aoife Finnegan †	Newry and Armagh	9 February 2025
Sinn Féin (27)	Colm Gildernew	Fermanagh and South Tyrone	20 June 2017
Sinn Féin (27)	Deirdre Hargey	Belfast South	9 January 2020
Sinn Féin (27)	Declan Kearney	South Antrim	5 May 2016
Sinn Féin (27)	Gerry Kelly	Belfast North	25 June 1998
Sinn Féin (27)	Liz Kimmins	Newry and Armagh	9 January 2020
Sinn Féin (27)	Cathy Mason	South Down	5 May 2022
Sinn Féin (27)	Declan McAleer	West Tyrone	2 July 2012
Sinn Féin (27)	Philip McGuigan	North Antrim	30 August 2016
Sinn Féin (27)	Aine Murphy	Fermanagh and South Tyrone	2 July 2021
Sinn Féin (27)	Carál Ní Chuilín °	Belfast North	7 March 2007
Sinn Féin (27)	John O'Dowd	Upper Bann	26 November 2003
Sinn Féin (27)	Michelle O'Neill*	Mid Ulster	7 March 2007
Sinn Féin (27)	Aisling Reilly	Belfast West	19 October 2021
Sinn Féin (27)	Pat Sheehan	Belfast West	7 December 2010
Sinn Féin (27)	Emma Sheerin	Mid Ulster	4 December 2018
Democratic Unionist Party (25)	David Brooks	Belfast East	5 May 2022
Democratic Unionist Party (25)	Maurice Bradley	East Londonderry	5 May 2016
Democratic Unionist Party (25)	Phillip Brett	Belfast North	5 May 2022
Democratic Unionist Party (25)	Cheryl Brownlee †	East Antrim	15 September 2023
Democratic Unionist Party (25)	Tom Buchanan	West Tyrone	26 November 2003
Democratic Unionist Party (25)	Keith Buchanan	Mid Ulster	5 May 2016
Democratic Unionist Party (25)	Jonathan Buckley	Upper Bann	2 March 2017
Democratic Unionist Party (25)	Joanne Bunting	Belfast East	5 May 2016
Democratic Unionist Party (25)	Pam Cameron	South Antrim	5 May 2011
Democratic Unionist Party (25)	Trevor Clarke	South Antrim	28 June 2017
Democratic Unionist Party (25)	Diane Dodds	Upper Bann	11 January 2020
Democratic Unionist Party (25)	Stephen Dunne	North Down	1 June 2021
Democratic Unionist Party (25)	Deborah Erskine	Fermanagh and South Tyrone	11 October 2021
Democratic Unionist Party (25)	Diane Forsythe	South Down	5 May 2022
Democratic Unionist Party (25)	Paul Frew	North Antrim	21 June 2010
Democratic Unionist Party (25)	Paul Givan	Lagan Valley	10 June 2010
Democratic Unionist Party (25)	Harry Harvey	Strangford	12 September 2019
Democratic Unionist Party (25)	Gareth Wilson †	Newry and Armagh	5 January 2026
Democratic Unionist Party (25)	Brian Kingston	Belfast North	5 May 2022
Democratic Unionist Party (25)	Emma Little-Pengelly †	Lagan Valley	12 May 2022
Democratic Unionist Party (25)	Gordon Lyons	East Antrim	11 August 2015
Democratic Unionist Party (25)	Peter Martin †	North Down	10 July 2024
Democratic Unionist Party (25)	Michelle McIlveen	Strangford	7 March 2007
Democratic Unionist Party (25)	Julie Middleton †	Foyle	13 April 2026
Democratic Unionist Party (25)	Alan Robinson	East Londonderry	5 May 2022
Alliance Party (17)	Kellie Armstrong	Strangford	5 May 2016
Alliance Party (17)	John Blair °	South Antrim	27 June 2018
Alliance Party (17)	Paula Bradshaw	Belfast South	5 May 2016
Alliance Party (17)	Stewart Dickson	East Antrim	5 May 2011
Alliance Party (17)	Danny Donnelly	East Antrim	5 May 2022
Alliance Party (17)	Connie Egan	North Down	5 May 2022
Alliance Party (17)	Michelle Guy †	Lagan Valley	10 July 2024
Alliance Party (17)	David Honeyford	Lagan Valley	5 May 2022
Alliance Party (17)	Naomi Long*	Belfast East	9 January 2020
Alliance Party (17)	Nick Mathison	Strangford	5 May 2022
Alliance Party (17)	Nuala McAllister	Belfast North	5 May 2022
Alliance Party (17)	Andrew McMurray †	South Down	29 April 2024
Alliance Party (17)	Peter McReynolds	Belfast East	5 May 2022
Alliance Party (17)	Andrew Muir	North Down	18 December 2019
Alliance Party (17)	Sian Mulholland †	North Antrim	4 April 2023
Alliance Party (17)	Kate Nicholl	Belfast South	5 May 2022
Alliance Party (17)	Eóin Tennyson	Upper Bann	5 May 2022
Ulster Unionist Party (8)	Steve Aiken °	South Antrim	5 May 2016
Ulster Unionist Party (8)	Andy Allen	Belfast East	15 September 2015
Ulster Unionist Party (8)	Diana Armstrong †	Fermanagh and South Tyrone	27 September 2024
Ulster Unionist Party (8)	Robbie Butler	Lagan Valley	5 May 2016
Ulster Unionist Party (8)	Jon Burrows ††	North Antrim	4 August 2025
Ulster Unionist Party (8)	Alan Chambers	North Down	5 May 2016
Ulster Unionist Party (8)	Mike Nesbitt*	Strangford	5 May 2011
Ulster Unionist Party (8)	John Stewart	East Antrim	2 March 2017
Social Democratic and Labour Party (8)	Mark Durkan	Foyle	5 May 2011
Social Democratic and Labour Party (8)	Cara Hunter	East Londonderry	18 May 2020
Social Democratic and Labour Party (8)	Daniel McCrossan	West Tyrone	7 January 2016
Social Democratic and Labour Party (8)	Colin McGrath	South Down	5 May 2016
Social Democratic and Labour Party (8)	Patsy McGlone	Mid Ulster	26 November 2003
Social Democratic and Labour Party (8)	Sinéad McLaughlin	Foyle	11 January 2020
Social Democratic and Labour Party (8)	Justin McNulty ‡‡	Newry and Armagh	5 May 2016
Social Democratic and Labour Party (8)	Matthew O'Toole*	Belfast South	11 January 2020
Traditional Unionist Voice	Timothy Gaston †	North Antrim	16 July 2024
People Before Profit	Gerry Carroll	Belfast West	7 May 2016
Independent Unionist	Doug Beattie ‡	Upper Bann	5 May 2016
Independent Unionist	Claire Sugden	East Londonderry	6 May 2014
Speaker	Edwin Poots ‡	Belfast South	25 June 1998

* Party Leader in Stormont

† Co-opted to replace an elected MLA

‡ Changed affiliation during the term

° Deputy Speaker

== MLAs by constituency and current affiliation ==
Members are ranked by their order of election, and if co-opted, the position of the person who they co-opted.

Constituency	Name	Party
Belfast East	Naomi Long*	Alliance Party of Northern Ireland
Belfast East	Joanne Bunting	Democratic Unionist Party
Belfast East	Peter McReynolds	Alliance Party of Northern Ireland
Belfast East	David Brooks	Democratic Unionist Party
Belfast East	Andy Allen	Ulster Unionist Party
Belfast North	Gerry Kelly	Sinn Féin
Belfast North	Carál Ní Chuilín	Sinn Féin
Belfast North	Phillip Brett	Democratic Unionist Party
Belfast North	Brian Kingston	Democratic Unionist Party
Belfast North	Nuala McAllister	Alliance Party of Northern Ireland
Belfast South	Deirdre Hargey	Sinn Féin
Belfast South	Edwin Poots ‡	Speaker
Belfast South	Matthew O'Toole*	Social Democratic and Labour Party
Belfast South	Paula Bradshaw	Alliance Party of Northern Ireland
Belfast South	Kate Nicholl	Alliance Party of Northern Ireland
Belfast West	Danny Baker	Sinn Féin
Belfast West	Órlaithí Flynn	Sinn Féin
Belfast West	Pat Sheehan	Sinn Féin
Belfast West	Aisling Reilly	Sinn Féin
Belfast West	Gerry Carroll	People Before Profit
East Antrim	John Stewart	Ulster Unionist Party
East Antrim	Gordon Lyons	Democratic Unionist Party
East Antrim	Stewart Dickson	Alliance Party of Northern Ireland
East Antrim	Danny Donnelly	Alliance Party of Northern Ireland
East Antrim	Cheryl Brownlee †	Democratic Unionist Party
East Londonderry	Maurice Bradley	Democratic Unionist Party
East Londonderry	Alan Robinson	Democratic Unionist Party
East Londonderry	Claire Sugden	Independent Unionist
East Londonderry	Caoimhe Archibald	Sinn Féin
East Londonderry	Cara Hunter	Social Democratic and Labour Party
Fermanagh and South Tyrone	Jemma Dolan	Sinn Féin
Fermanagh and South Tyrone	Diana Armstrong †	Ulster Unionist Party
Fermanagh and South Tyrone	Colm Gildernew	Sinn Féin
Fermanagh and South Tyrone	Aine Murphy	Sinn Féin
Fermanagh and South Tyrone	Deborah Erskine	Democratic Unionist Party
Foyle	Pádraig Delargy	Sinn Féin
Foyle	Mark Durkan	Social Democratic and Labour Party
Foyle	Ciara Ferguson	Sinn Féin
Foyle	Sinéad McLaughlin	Social Democratic and Labour Party
Foyle	Gary Middleton	Democratic Unionist Party
Lagan Valley	Emma Little-Pengelly †	Democratic Unionist Party
Lagan Valley	Robbie Butler	Ulster Unionist Party
Lagan Valley	Michelle Guy †	Alliance Party of Northern Ireland
Lagan Valley	Paul Givan*	Democratic Unionist Party
Lagan Valley	David Honeyford	Alliance Party of Northern Ireland
Mid Ulster	Michelle O'Neill*	Sinn Féin
Mid Ulster	Emma Sheerin	Sinn Féin
Mid Ulster	Linda Dillon	Sinn Féin
Mid Ulster	Keith Buchanan	Democratic Unionist Party
Mid Ulster	Patsy McGlone	Social Democratic and Labour Party
Newry and Armagh	Aoife Finnegan †	Sinn Féin
Newry and Armagh	Cathal Boylan	Sinn Féin
Newry and Armagh	Justin McNulty ‡‡	Social Democratic and Labour Party
Newry and Armagh	Liz Kimmins	Sinn Féin
Newry and Armagh	Gareth Wilson †	Democratic Unionist Party
North Antrim	Jon Burrows †	Ulster Unionist Party
North Antrim	Philip McGuigan	Sinn Féin
North Antrim	Timothy Gaston †	Traditional Unionist Voice
North Antrim	Paul Frew	Democratic Unionist Party
North Antrim	Sian Mulholland †	Alliance Party of Northern Ireland
North Down	Peter Martin †	Democratic Unionist Party
North Down	Andrew Muir	Alliance Party of Northern Ireland
North Down	Stephen Dunne	Democratic Unionist Party
North Down	Alan Chambers	Ulster Unionist Party
North Down	Connie Egan	Alliance Party of Northern Ireland
South Antrim	Declan Kearney	Sinn Féin
South Antrim	John Blair	Alliance Party of Northern Ireland
South Antrim	Steve Aiken	Ulster Unionist Party
South Antrim	Pam Cameron	Democratic Unionist Party
South Antrim	Trevor Clarke	Democratic Unionist Party
South Down	Sinéad Ennis	Sinn Féin
South Down	Cathy Mason	Sinn Féin
South Down	Andrew McMurray †	Alliance Party of Northern Ireland
South Down	Diane Forsythe	Democratic Unionist Party
South Down	Colin McGrath	Social Democratic and Labour Party
Strangford	Kellie Armstrong	Alliance Party of Northern Ireland
Strangford	Michelle McIlveen	Democratic Unionist Party
Strangford	Harry Harvey	Democratic Unionist Party
Strangford	Mike Nesbitt*	Ulster Unionist Party
Strangford	Nick Mathison	Alliance Party of Northern Ireland
Upper Bann	John O'Dowd	Sinn Féin
Upper Bann	Jonathan Buckley	Democratic Unionist Party
Upper Bann	Diane Dodds	Democratic Unionist Party
Upper Bann	Doug Beattie ‡	Independent Unionist
Upper Bann	Eóin Tennyson	Alliance Party of Northern Ireland
West Tyrone	Paul Boggs	Sinn Féin
West Tyrone	Nicola Brogan	Sinn Féin
West Tyrone	Daniel McCrossan	Social Democratic and Labour Party
West Tyrone	Tom Buchanan	Democratic Unionist Party
West Tyrone	Declan McAleer	Sinn Féin

* Party Leader in Stormont

† Co-opted to replace an elected MLA

‡ Changed affiliation during the term

== Changes since the election ==
=== † Co-options ===
Date co-opted	Constituency	Party	Outgoing	Co-optee	Reason
12 May 2022	Lagan Valley	DUP	Jeffrey Donaldson	Emma Little Pengelly	Jeffrey Donaldson remaining as the Member of Parliament for Lagan Valley.
4 April 2023	North Antrim	Alliance	Patricia O'Lynn	Sian Mulholland	Patricia O'Lynn resigned.
15 September 2023	East Antrim	DUP	David Hilditch	Cheryl Brownlee	David Hilditch resigned.
29 April 2024	South Down	Alliance	Patrick Brown	Andrew McMurray	Patrick Brown resigned.
10 July 2024	Lagan Valley	Alliance	Sorcha Eastwood	Michelle Guy	Sorcha Eastwood elected as the Member of Parliament for Lagan Valley in the 2024 general election.
10 July 2024	North Antrim	UUP	Robin Swann	Colin Crawford	Robin Swann elected as the Member of Parliament for South Antrim in the 2024 general election.
10 July 2024	North Down	Ind. Unionist	Alex Easton	Peter Martin (DUP)	Alex Easton elected as the Member of Parliament for North Down in the 2024 general election.
16 July 2024	North Antrim	TUV	Jim Allister	Timothy Gaston	Jim Allister elected as the Member of Parliament for North Antrim in the 2024 general election.
27 September 2024	Fermanagh and South Tyrone	UUP	Tom Elliott	Diana Armstrong	Tom Elliott was given a peerage in the 2024 Dissolution Honours.
9 February 2025	Newry and Armagh	Sinn Féin	Conor Murphy	Aoife Finnegan	Conor Murphy was elected to Seanad Éireann at the 2025 Seanad election.
4 August 2025	North Antrim	UUP	Colin Crawford	Jon Burrows	Colin Crawford resigned.
5 January 2026	Newry and Armagh	DUP	William Irwin	Gareth Wilson	William Irwin resigned.
13 April 2026	Foyle	DUP	Gary Middleton	Julie Middleton	Gary Middleton resigned.
1 September 2026	West Tyrone	Sinn Féin	Maoliosa McHugh	Paul Boggs	Maoliosa McHugh resigned.

=== ‡ Changes in affiliation ===
Date	Constituency	Name	Previous affiliation	New affiliation	Circumstance
3 February 2024	Belfast South	Edwin Poots	DUP	Speaker	Edwin Poots elected Speaker of the Assembly at its first sitting.
3 February 2024	Newry and Armagh	Justin McNulty	SDLP	Ind. Nationalist	Whip suspended after leaving Assembly session early to manage Laois GAA at a gaelic match.
20 August 2024	Newry and Armagh	Justin McNulty	Ind. Nationalist	SDLP	Whip restored.
31 May 2026	Upper Bann	Doug Beattie	UUP	Ind. Unionist	Beattie resigned from the Ulster Unionist Party.
