= 6th Northern Ireland Assembly =

Northern Ireland MLAs 2017 to 2022

←	5th Assembly	7th Assembly	→

Overview
- Legislative body: Assembly
- Jurisdiction: Northern Ireland
- Meeting place: Parliament Buildings, Stormont
- Term: 2 March 2017 – 27 March 2022
- Election: 2017 assembly election
- Government: Executive of the 6th Assembly
- Members: 90
- Speaker: Alex Maskey
- First Minister: Arlene Foster / Paul Givan
- Deputy First Minister: Michelle O'Neill

Sessions
- 1st: 13 March 2017 – 13 March 2017
- 2nd: 21 October 2019 – 18 August 2020
- 3rd: 7 September 2020 – 16 March 2021
- 4th: 9 September 2021 – 24 March 2022

This is a list of the 90 members of the sixth Northern Ireland Assembly, the unicameral devolved legislature of Northern Ireland. The election took place on 2 March 2017, with counting finishing the following day; voter turnout was estimated at 64.8%.

Only five (rather than six) MLAs were elected from each of the 18 constituencies, following the Assembly Members (Reduction of Numbers) Act (Northern Ireland) 2016. The reduction negatively affected Unionist candidates whose bloc lost its majority for the first time in the history of the Assembly. The SDLP was also negatively impacted, losing its only West Belfast seat.

Incumbent Speaker Robin Newton informally convened the Assembly on 22 March to pay tribute to the former deputy First Minister Martin McGuinness, who had died the day before.

However, with the DUP and Sinn Féin unable to agree to form their mandatory coalition government, the Assembly did not formally convene. On 27 April, talks were paused until after a snap general election on 8 June, with a deadline of 29 June 2017 for the parties to reach agreement, but this deadline was repeatedly extended over the next three years. The DUP, Sinn Féin and other parties finally agreed terms on 10 January 2020.

== Party strengths ==
Party		Designation	Mar 2017 election	Mar 2022 end
●	Democratic Unionist Party	Unionist	28	26
●	Sinn Féin	Nationalist	27	26
●	Social Democratic and Labour Party	Nationalist	12	12
●	Ulster Unionist Party	Unionist	10	10
●	Alliance Party of Northern Ireland	Other	8	7
	Green Party Northern Ireland	Other	2	2
	Traditional Unionist Voice	Unionist	1	1
	People Before Profit	Other	1	1
	Independent	Other	0	1
	Independent Unionist	Unionist	1	3
	Speaker (Note: Once elected, the Speaker relinquishes party affiliation.)	None	0	1
Totals by Designation		Unionist	40	40
Totals by Designation		Nationalist	39	38
Totals by Designation		Other	11	11
Totals by Designation		None	0	1
Total			90	90
● = Northern Ireland Executive

=== Graphical representation ===
As elected, 2 March 2017

9 May 2018

Current composition, from 10 January 2019

Current composition following the election of the Speaker from Sinn Féin, 11 January 2020

Parties arranged roughly on the nationalist-unionist spectrum

== MLAs by party ==
Party	Name	Constituency	Member since
Democratic Unionist Party (26)	Maurice Bradley	East Londonderry	5 May 2016
Democratic Unionist Party (26)	Paula Bradley	Belfast North	5 May 2011
Democratic Unionist Party (26)	Keith Buchanan	Mid Ulster	5 May 2016
Democratic Unionist Party (26)	Thomas Buchanan	West Tyrone	26 November 2003
Democratic Unionist Party (26)	Jonathan Buckley	Upper Bann	2 March 2017
Democratic Unionist Party (26)	Joanne Bunting	Belfast East	5 May 2016
Democratic Unionist Party (26)	Pam Cameron	South Antrim	5 May 2011
Democratic Unionist Party (26)	Trevor Clarke †	South Antrim	28 June 2017
Democratic Unionist Party (26)	Diane Dodds †	Upper Bann	9 January 2020
Democratic Unionist Party (26)	Stephen Dunne †	North Down	28 June 2021
Democratic Unionist Party (26)	Deborah Erskine †	Fermanagh and South Tyrone	11 October 2021
Democratic Unionist Party (26)	Paul Frew	North Antrim	21 June 2010
Democratic Unionist Party (26)	Paul Givan	Lagan Valley	10 June 2010
Democratic Unionist Party (26)	Harry Harvey †	Strangford	12 September 2019
Democratic Unionist Party (26)	David Hilditch	East Antrim	25 June 1998
Democratic Unionist Party (26)	William Humphrey	Belfast North	13 September 2010
Democratic Unionist Party (26)	William Irwin	Newry and Armagh	7 March 2007
Democratic Unionist Party (26)	Gordon Lyons	East Antrim	19 August 2015
Democratic Unionist Party (26)	Michelle McIlveen	Strangford	7 March 2007
Democratic Unionist Party (26)	Gary Middleton	Foyle	13 April 2015
Democratic Unionist Party (26)	Robin Newton	Belfast East	26 November 2003
Democratic Unionist Party (26)	Edwin Poots †	Belfast South	25 June 1998
Democratic Unionist Party (26)	Paul Rankin †	Lagan Valley	14 March 2022
Democratic Unionist Party (26)	George Robinson	East Londonderry	26 November 2003
Democratic Unionist Party (26)	Mervyn Storey	North Antrim	26 November 2003
Democratic Unionist Party (26)	Peter Weir	Strangford	25 June 1998
Sinn Féin (26)	Caoimhe Archibald	East Londonderry	5 May 2016
Sinn Féin (26)	Cathal Boylan	Newry and Armagh	7 March 2007
Sinn Féin (26)	Nicola Brogan ††	West Tyrone	6 November 2020
Sinn Féin (26)	Pádraig Delargy ††	Foyle	13 September 2021
Sinn Féin (26)	Linda Dillon	Mid Ulster	5 May 2016
Sinn Féin (26)	Jemma Dolan	Fermanagh and South Tyrone	2 March 2017
Sinn Féin (26)	Sinéad Ennis	South Down	2 March 2017
Sinn Féin (26)	Ciara Ferguson ††	Foyle	13 September 2021
Sinn Féin (26)	Órlaithí Flynn	Belfast West	7 December 2016
Sinn Féin (26)	Colm Gildernew †	Fermanagh and South Tyrone	20 June 2017
Sinn Féin (26)	Deirdre Hargey †	Belfast South	9 January 2020
Sinn Féin (26)	Declan Kearney	South Antrim	5 May 2016
Sinn Féin (26)	Gerry Kelly	Belfast North	25 June 1998
Sinn Féin (26)	Liz Kimmins †	Newry and Armagh	9 January 2020
Sinn Féin (26)	Declan McAleer	West Tyrone	5 May 2011
Sinn Féin (26)	Philip McGuigan	North Antrim	30 August 2016
Sinn Féin (26)	Maolíosa McHugh †	West Tyrone	28 May 2019
Sinn Féin (26)	Aine Murphy †	Fermanagh and South Tyrone	2 July 2021
Sinn Féin (26)	Aisling Reilly †	Belfast West	14 October 2021
Sinn Féin (26)	Emma Rogan †	South Down	20 June 2017
Sinn Féin (26)	Emma Sheerin †	Mid Ulster	4 December 2018
Sinn Féin (26)	Conor Murphy	Newry and Armagh	8 June 2015
Sinn Féin (26)	Carál Ní Chuilín	Belfast North	7 March 2007
Sinn Féin (26)	John O'Dowd	Upper Bann	26 November 2003
Sinn Féin (26)	Michelle O'Neill	Mid Ulster	7 March 2007
Sinn Féin (26)	Pat Sheehan	Belfast West	7 December 2010
Social Democratic and Labour Party (12)	Sinéad Bradley	South Down	5 May 2016
Social Democratic and Labour Party (12)	Pat Catney	Lagan Valley	2 March 2017
Social Democratic and Labour Party (12)	Mark H. Durkan	Foyle	5 May 2011
Social Democratic and Labour Party (12)	Cara Hunter †	East Londonderry	18 May 2020
Social Democratic and Labour Party (12)	Dolores Kelly	Upper Bann	2 March 2017
Social Democratic and Labour Party (12)	Nichola Mallon	Belfast North	5 May 2016
Social Democratic and Labour Party (12)	Daniel McCrossan	West Tyrone	7 January 2016
Social Democratic and Labour Party (12)	Patsy McGlone	Mid Ulster	26 November 2003
Social Democratic and Labour Party (12)	Colin McGrath	South Down	5 May 2016
Social Democratic and Labour Party (12)	Sinead McLaughlin †	Foyle	10 January 2020
Social Democratic and Labour Party (12)	Justin McNulty	Newry and Armagh	5 May 2016
Social Democratic and Labour Party (12)	Matthew O'Toole †	Belfast South	11 January 2020
Ulster Unionist Party (10)	Steve Aiken	South Antrim	5 May 2016
Ulster Unionist Party (10)	Andy Allen	Belfast East	15 September 2015
Ulster Unionist Party (10)	Rosemary Barton	Fermanagh and South Tyrone	5 May 2016
Ulster Unionist Party (10)	Doug Beattie	Upper Bann	5 May 2016
Ulster Unionist Party (10)	Roy Beggs, Jr.	East Antrim	25 June 1998
Ulster Unionist Party (10)	Robbie Butler	Lagan Valley	5 May 2016
Ulster Unionist Party (10)	Alan Chambers	North Down	5 May 2016
Ulster Unionist Party (10)	Mike Nesbitt	Strangford	5 May 2011
Ulster Unionist Party (10)	John Stewart	East Antrim	2 March 2017
Ulster Unionist Party (10)	Robin Swann	North Antrim	5 May 2011
Alliance Party of Northern Ireland (7)	Kellie Armstrong	Strangford	5 May 2016
Alliance Party of Northern Ireland (7)	Paula Bradshaw	Belfast South	5 May 2016
Alliance Party of Northern Ireland (7)	Stewart Dickson	East Antrim	5 May 2011
Alliance Party of Northern Ireland (7)	John Blair †	South Antrim	27 June 2018
Alliance Party of Northern Ireland (7)	Naomi Long ††	Belfast East	9 January 2020
Alliance Party of Northern Ireland (7)	Chris Lyttle	Belfast East	5 July 2010
Alliance Party of Northern Ireland (7)	Andrew Muir †	North Down	16 December 2019
Green Party Northern Ireland (2)	Clare Bailey	Belfast South	5 May 2016
Green Party Northern Ireland (2)	Rachel Woods †	North Down	7 October 2019
People Before Profit (1)	Gerry Carroll	Belfast West	5 May 2016
Traditional Unionist Voice (1)	Jim Allister	North Antrim	5 May 2011
Independent Unionist (3)	Alex Easton ‡	North Down	26 November 2003
Independent Unionist (3)	Claire Sugden	East Londonderry	6 May 2014
Independent Unionist (3)	Jim Wells ‡	South Down	25 June 1998
Independent (1)	Trevor Lunn ‡	Lagan Valley	7 March 2007
Speaker (1)	Alex Maskey ‡	Belfast West	25 June 1998

† Co-opted to replace an elected MLA

‡ Changed affiliation during the term

== MLAs by constituency ==
Constituency	Name	Party
Belfast East	Andy Allen	Ulster Unionist Party
Belfast East	Joanne Bunting	Democratic Unionist Party
Belfast East	Naomi Long ††	Alliance Party of Northern Ireland
Belfast East	Chris Lyttle	Alliance Party of Northern Ireland
Belfast East	Robin Newton	Democratic Unionist Party
Belfast North	Paula Bradley	Democratic Unionist Party
Belfast North	William Humphrey	Democratic Unionist Party
Belfast North	Gerry Kelly	Sinn Féin
Belfast North	Nichola Mallon	Social Democratic and Labour Party
Belfast North	Carál Ní Chuilín	Sinn Féin
Belfast South	Clare Bailey	Green Party Northern Ireland
Belfast South	Paula Bradshaw	Alliance Party of Northern Ireland
Belfast South	Deirdre Hargey †	Sinn Féin
Belfast South	Matthew O'Toole †	Social Democratic and Labour Party
Belfast South	Edwin Poots †	Democratic Unionist Party
Belfast West	Gerry Carroll	People Before Profit
Belfast West	Órlaithí Flynn	Sinn Féin
Belfast West	Alex Maskey ‡	Speaker
Belfast West	Aisling Reilly †	Sinn Féin
Belfast West	Pat Sheehan	Sinn Féin
East Antrim	Roy Beggs, Jr.	Ulster Unionist Party
East Antrim	Stewart Dickson	Alliance Party of Northern Ireland
East Antrim	David Hilditch	Democratic Unionist Party
East Antrim	Gordon Lyons	Democratic Unionist Party
East Antrim	John Stewart	Ulster Unionist Party
East Londonderry	Caoimhe Archibald	Sinn Féin
East Londonderry	Maurice Bradley	Democratic Unionist Party
East Londonderry	Cara Hunter †	Social Democratic and Labour Party
East Londonderry	George Robinson	Democratic Unionist Party
East Londonderry	Claire Sugden	Independent Unionist
Fermanagh and South Tyrone	Rosemary Barton	Ulster Unionist Party
Fermanagh and South Tyrone	Jemma Dolan	Sinn Féin
Fermanagh and South Tyrone	Deborah Erskine †	Democratic Unionist Party
Fermanagh and South Tyrone	Colm Gildernew †	Sinn Féin
Fermanagh and South Tyrone	Aine Murphy †	Sinn Féin
Foyle	Pádraig Delargy ††	Sinn Féin
Foyle	Mark H. Durkan	Social Democratic and Labour Party
Foyle	Ciara Ferguson ††	Sinn Féin
Foyle	Sinead McLaughlin †	Social Democratic and Labour Party
Foyle	Gary Middleton	Democratic Unionist Party
Lagan Valley	Robbie Butler	Ulster Unionist Party
Lagan Valley	Pat Catney	Social Democratic and Labour Party
Lagan Valley	Paul Givan	Democratic Unionist Party
Lagan Valley	Trevor Lunn ‡	Independent
Lagan Valley	Paul Rankin †	Democratic Unionist Party
Mid Ulster	Keith Buchanan	Democratic Unionist Party
Mid Ulster	Linda Dillon	Sinn Féin
Mid Ulster	Patsy McGlone	Social Democratic and Labour Party
Mid Ulster	Michelle O'Neill	Sinn Féin
Mid Ulster	Emma Sheerin †	Sinn Féin
Newry and Armagh	Cathal Boylan	Sinn Féin
Newry and Armagh	William Irwin	Democratic Unionist Party
Newry and Armagh	Liz Kimmins †	Sinn Féin
Newry and Armagh	Justin McNulty	Social Democratic and Labour Party
Newry and Armagh	Conor Murphy	Sinn Féin
North Antrim	Jim Allister	Traditional Unionist Voice
North Antrim	Paul Frew	Democratic Unionist Party
North Antrim	Philip McGuigan	Sinn Féin
North Antrim	Mervyn Storey	Democratic Unionist Party
North Antrim	Robin Swann	Ulster Unionist Party
North Down	Alan Chambers	Ulster Unionist Party
North Down	Stephen Dunne †	Democratic Unionist Party
North Down	Alex Easton ‡	Independent Unionist
North Down	Andrew Muir †	Alliance Party of Northern Ireland
North Down	Rachel Woods †	Green Party Northern Ireland
South Antrim	Steve Aiken	Ulster Unionist Party
South Antrim	John Blair †	Alliance Party of Northern Ireland
South Antrim	Pam Cameron	Democratic Unionist Party
South Antrim	Trevor Clarke †	Democratic Unionist Party
South Antrim	Declan Kearney	Sinn Féin
South Down	Sinéad Bradley	Social Democratic and Labour Party
South Down	Sinéad Ennis	Sinn Féin
South Down	Colin McGrath	Social Democratic and Labour Party
South Down	Emma Rogan †	Sinn Féin
South Down	Jim Wells ‡	Independent Unionist
Strangford	Kellie Armstrong	Alliance Party of Northern Ireland
Strangford	Harry Harvey †	Democratic Unionist Party
Strangford	Michelle McIlveen	Democratic Unionist Party
Strangford	Mike Nesbitt	Ulster Unionist Party
Strangford	Peter Weir	Democratic Unionist Party
Upper Bann	Doug Beattie	Ulster Unionist Party
Upper Bann	Jonathan Buckley	Democratic Unionist Party
Upper Bann	Diane Dodds †	Democratic Unionist Party
Upper Bann	Dolores Kelly	Social Democratic and Labour Party
Upper Bann	John O'Dowd	Sinn Féin
West Tyrone	Nicola Brogan ††	Sinn Féin
West Tyrone	Thomas Buchanan	Democratic Unionist Party
West Tyrone	Declan McAleer	Sinn Féin
West Tyrone	Daniel McCrossan	Social Democratic and Labour Party
West Tyrone	Maolíosa McHugh †	Sinn Féin

† Co-opted to replace an elected MLA ‡ Changed affiliation during the term

== Changes since the election ==
=== † Co-options ===
Date co-opted	Constituency	Party	Outgoing	Co-optee	Reason
20 June 2017	West Tyrone	Sinn Féin	Barry McElduff	Catherine Kelly	Barry McElduff elected as Member of Parliament for West Tyrone in the 2017 general election.
20 June 2017	Foyle	Sinn Féin	Elisha McCallion	Karen Mullan	Elisha McCallion elected as Member of Parliament for Foyle in the 2017 general election.
20 June 2017	Fermanagh and South Tyrone	Sinn Féin	Michelle Gildernew	Colm Gildernew	Michelle Gildernew elected as Member of Parliament for Fermanagh and South Tyrone in the 2017 general election.
20 June 2017	South Down	Sinn Féin	Chris Hazzard	Emma Rogan	Chris Hazzard elected as Member of Parliament for South Down in the 2017 general election.
28 June 2017	South Antrim	DUP	Paul Girvan	Trevor Clarke	Paul Girvan elected as Member of Parliament for South Antrim in the 2017 general election.
27 June 2018	South Antrim	Alliance	David Ford	John Blair	David Ford resigned.
4 December 2018	Mid Ulster	Sinn Féin	Ian Milne	Emma Sheerin	Ian Milne was co-opted to Mid Ulster District Council.
28 May 2019	West Tyrone	Sinn Féin	Michaela Boyle	Maoliosa McHugh	Michaela Boyle was elected to Derry and Strabane District Council in the 2019 Northern Ireland local elections.
1 July 2019	Belfast East	Alliance	Naomi Long	Máire Hendron	Naomi Long elected as Member of the European Parliament for Northern Ireland in the 2019 European Parliament Election.
12 September 2019	Strangford	DUP	Simon Hamilton	Harry Harvey	Simon Hamilton resigned.
7 October 2019	North Down	Green (NI)	Steven Agnew	Rachel Woods	Steven Agnew resigned.
16 December 2019	North Down	Alliance	Stephen Farry	Andrew Muir	Stephen Farry was elected as Member of Parliament for North Down in the 2019 general election.
9 January 2020	Belfast East	Alliance	Máire Hendron	Naomi Long	Máire Hendron resigned.
9 January 2020	Upper Bann	DUP	Carla Lockhart	Diane Dodds	Carla Lockhart was elected as Member of Parliament for Upper Bann in the 2019 general election.
9 January 2020	Newry and Armagh	Sinn Féin	Megan Fearon	Liz Kimmins	Megan Fearon resigned.
9 January 2020	Belfast South	Sinn Féin	Máirtín Ó Muilleoir	Deirdre Hargey	Máirtín Ó Muilleoir resigned.
9 January 2020	Foyle	SDLP	Colum Eastwood	Sinead McLaughlin	Colum Eastwood was elected as Member of Parliament for Foyle in the 2019 general election.
9 January 2020	Belfast South	SDLP	Claire Hanna	Matthew O'Toole	Claire Hanna was elected as Member of Parliament for Belfast South in the 2019 general election.
10 February 2020	Foyle	Sinn Féin	Raymond McCartney	Martina Anderson	Raymond McCartney resigned.
18 May 2020	East Londonderry	SDLP	John Dallat	Cara Hunter	John Dallat died.
6 November 2020	West Tyrone	Sinn Féin	Catherine Kelly	Nicola Brogan	Catherine Kelly resigned.
28 June 2021	North Down	DUP	Gordon Dunne	Stephen Dunne	Gordon Dunne died.
4 July 2021	Fermanagh and South Tyrone	Sinn Féin	Sean Lynch	Aine Murphy	Sean Lynch resigned.
13 September 2021	Foyle	Sinn Féin	Karen Mullan	Pádraig Delargy	Karen Mullan resigned.
13 September 2021	Foyle	Sinn Féin	Martina Anderson	Ciara Ferguson	Martina Anderson resigned.
11 October 2021	Fermanagh and South Tyrone	DUP	Arlene Foster	Deborah Erskine	Arlene Foster resigned.
14 October 2021	Belfast West	Sinn Féin	Fra McCann	Aisling Reilly	Fra McCann resigned.
7 March 2022	Belfast South	DUP	Christopher Stalford	Edwin Poots	Christopher Stalford died.
14 March 2022	Lagan Valley	DUP	Edwin Poots	Paul Rankin	Edwin Poots resigned in order to be transferred to Belfast South.

=== ‡ Changes in affiliation ===
Date	Constituency	Name	Previous affiliation	New affiliation	Circumstance
9 May 2018	South Down	Jim Wells	DUP	Ind. Unionist	DUP whip withdrawn from Jim Wells following criticisms of the party leadership.
11 January 2020	Belfast West	Alex Maskey	Sinn Féin	Speaker	Alex Maskey elected Speaker of the Assembly at its first sitting.
2 March 2020	Lagan Valley	Trevor Lunn	Alliance	Independent	Trevor Lunn resigned from Alliance due to "internal difficulties".
1 July 2021	North Down	Alex Easton	DUP	Ind. Unionist	Alex Easton resigned from the DUP following changes in the party leadership.
