= Robin Swann =

Northern Irish politician (born 1971)

Robin Swann MP
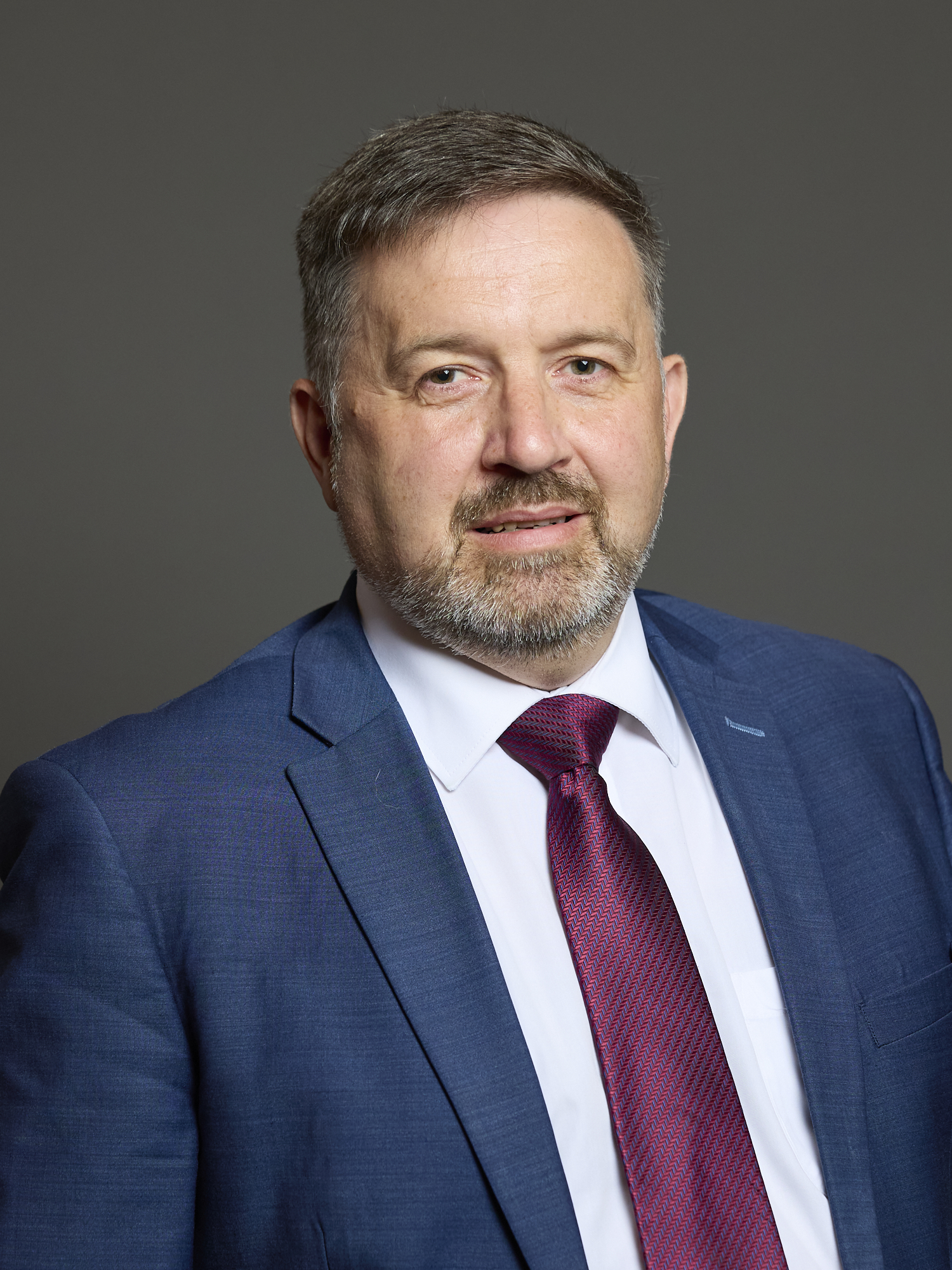
- Official portrait, 2024

Member of Parliament for South Antrim
- Incumbent
- Assumed office 4 July 2024
- Preceded by: Paul Girvan
- Majority: 7,512 (17.5%)

Minister of Health
- In office 3 February 2024 – 28 May 2024
- First Minister: Michelle O'Neill
- Preceded by: Himself (2022)
- Succeeded by: Mike Nesbitt
- In office 11 January 2020 – 27 October 2022
- First Minister: Arlene Foster; Paul Givan
- Preceded by: Michelle O'Neill
- Succeeded by: Himself (2024)

16th Leader of the Ulster Unionist Party
- In office 8 April 2017 – 9 November 2019
- Deputy: Steve Aiken
- Preceded by: Mike Nesbitt
- Succeeded by: Steve Aiken

Ulster Unionist Chief Whip
- In office 6 April 2012 – 8 April 2017
- Leader: Mike Nesbitt
- Preceded by: John McCallister
- Succeeded by: Steve Aiken

Member of the Legislative Assembly for North Antrim
- In office 5 May 2011 – 4 July 2024
- Preceded by: Robert Coulter
- Succeeded by: Colin Crawford

Personal details
- Born: Robert Samuel Swann; 24 September 1971 (age 55) Kells, County Antrim, Northern Ireland
- Party: Ulster Unionist Party
- Spouse: Jennifer McIlroy (m. 2008)
- Children: 2
- Education: Open University
- Website: www.robinswannmp.com

Robert Samuel Swann (born 24 September 1971) is a Northern Irish politician who has served as Member of Parliament (MP) for South Antrim since 2024. He previously served twice as Minister of Health, first from January 2020 to October 2022 and again from February 2024 to May 2024. Swann was a Member of the Legislative Assembly (MLA) for North Antrim from 2011 to 2024. He also served as leader of the Ulster Unionist Party (UUP) from 2017 to 2019.

During his first term as Minister of Health, Swann led Northern Ireland's response to the COVID-19 pandemic. His handling of the crisis was widely praised, leading him to top the poll in North Antrim at the 2022 Assembly election. Swann was reappointed to the position following the 2024 Executive formation as someone who "knows the brief."

He resigned as health minister in May 2024 to run in the 2024 general election in South Antrim. Swann was elected with 38 per cent of the vote and a majority of 7,512 as the UUP's sole MP in the House of Commons.

== Early life and education ==
Robert Samuel Swann, was born on 24 September 1971 in Kells, County Antrim. His mother Ida was a hospital cleaner and his father Brian was a plumber, and he has a younger brother, David.

Swann contracted asthma as a child, having been "born in an old farmhouse riddled with damp". The family moved to a housing executive house in Kells when he was aged two. Swann joined the Young Farmers' Clubs of Ulster at the age of 12.

Swann attended Kells and Connor Primary, then Ballymena Academy, after which he worked at McQuillan Meats from 1989 to 1993. He did not attend university, although he did later gain a Bachelor of Science degree and a professional certificate in management from the Open University. Swann worked for SGS, a multinational inspection and testing company based in Switzerland, before entering politics.

== Political career ==
Swann was first elected to the Northern Ireland Assembly in 2011 in the North Antrim constituency. Swann successfully defended his seat in the 2016 Assembly election and at the snap election in March 2017, where he was the first unionist elected in North Antrim. Swann was elected Ulster Unionist leader in April 2017; he resigned in November 2019 in order to spend more time with his family.

Swann came second in the North Antrim constituency in the 2019 Westminster election, with double the UUP vote of the previous election.

In the 2022 Assembly election Swann went on to top the North Antrim poll. His increased vote was attributed to his work as health minister during the COVID-19 pandemic. Swann credited his success to the work of those in the health service.

=== Member of Parliament (2024–present) ===
==== Election ====
On 1 February 2024, Swann was announced as the UUP's parliamentary candidate for South Antrim at the 2024 United Kingdom general election, a target seat for the UUP. Swann confirmed that he would continue his Westminster campaign on 8 February 2024, despite his appointment as Health Minister.

With 55.92% voter turnout in South Antrim, Swann won the seat for the UUP with a total vote of 16,311 with incumbent Democratic Unionist Party (DUP) MP Paul Girvan trailing in his wake with 8,799 votes.

In June 2025, Swann warned that the proposed Terminally Ill Adults (End of Life) Bill "must be defeated" and tabled an amendment to stop aspects of the bill from applying to Northern Ireland.

== Minister of Health ==
=== First term (2020–2022) ===
In 2020, Swann was appointed Minister of Health and presided over the response of the Northern Ireland Executive to the COVID-19 pandemic.

Swann introduced the Organ and Tissue Donation (Deemed Consent) Bill, or "Dáithí's Law" in the Assembly in 2021. It was named after six-year-old Dáithí Mac Gabhann from Belfast, who needs a heart transplant. The legislation came into effect on 1 June 2023 and introduced an opt-out system, meaning people would automatically become donors unless they stated otherwise.

On 2 February 2022 a 44-year-old man was charged with threatening to kill Swann, he was later accused of harassment and improper use of a telecommunications network.

Swann ceased to be Minister for Health on 27 October 2022 following the collapse of power-sharing at the Northern Ireland Executive.

The High Court dismissed a £100m lawsuit against NI politicians over COVID-19 regulations in December 2022. Swann has been called as a participant in the UK Covid Inquiry at the hearing to Module 1 he said "Failed reforms hindered NI Covid response."

In August 2023, Swann welcomed progress that had been made on clamping down on some of the most expensive nursing agency costs in the local health service in Northern Ireland.

=== Second term (2024) ===
==== Appointment ====
On 3 February 2024, Swann was reappointed Minister for Health following the formation of the Executive of the 7th Northern Ireland Assembly. Swann's appointment revealed a split within the UUP, with Andy Allen MLA criticising his return as Swann was already confirmed as a Westminster candidate. Allen argued that "we need a health minister with their full focus on the task at hand, not one eye on WM (Westminster).” Following his appointment, Swann wrote to trade unions inviting them to early discussions.

==== February ====
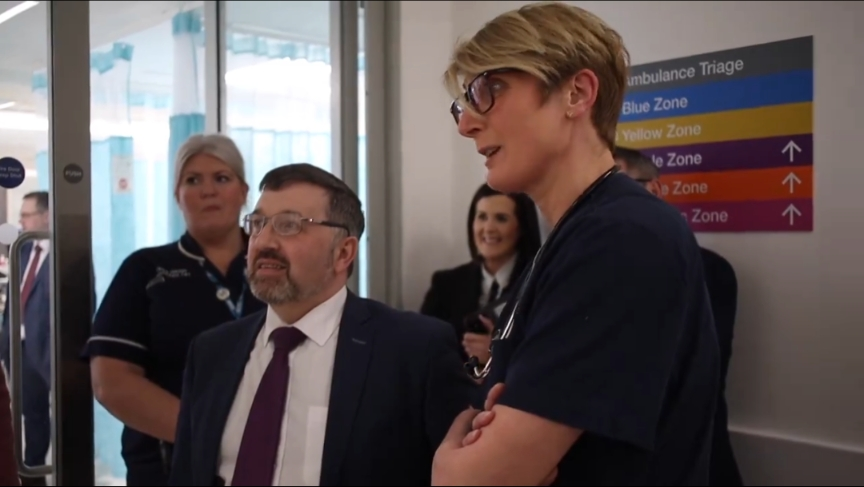
Swann meeting staff at the Ulster Hospital on 5 Feb. 2024

On 5 February 2024, he visited the Ulster Hospital and reiterated his intention to secure pay settlements for staff and resolve current industrial action.

Swann paid tribute to staff in Northern Ireland's dedicated Sexual Assault Referral Centre at an event marking 10 years since its opening on 7 February 2024. Also on 7 February 2024, Swann asked officials to look “urgently” at planned bed cuts at the Northern Ireland Children's Hospice.

On 9 February 2024, Swann confirmed that he will reinstate £85,000 funding for the Children's Hospice, in a move which defined the beginning of his tenure.

In the Assembly, on 13 February 2024, Swann revealed that a Women's Health Action Plan is being developed by the health department, paving the way for a longer-term comprehensive Women's Health Strategy.

On 15 February 2024, Swann announced that publicly funded IVF treatment will increase to one full cycle for eligible women.

On 20 February 2024, Swann wrote to the BMA Junior Doctors Committee in relation to planned industrial action next month. He also emphasised that hospital waiting lists cannot be tackled in isolation from other issues facing the health service, remarking that “piecemeal interventions” alone will not be sufficient.

Swann visited the Northern Ireland Chest Heart and Stroke (NICHS) team at the Junction in Antrim on 23 February 2024 as part of NICHS Heart Month.

On 26 February 2024, Swann welcomed the decision by health service trade unions to ballot members on a proposed pay settlement for 2023–24. He stated that "this is a positive step..." towards his key priority of resolving pay disputes. On the same day, Swann praised GPs for committing to student training.

In a keynote speech, Swann warned of an “extremely difficult and worsening” financial position for health and social care services on 27 February 2024. He remarked that "waiting lists are beyond unacceptable. They cry out for action and I will pursue every feasible opportunity to improve the situation."

On 29 February 2024, Swann and the Executive Office Junior Ministers Pam Cameron and Aisling Reilly joined Regional Trauma Network representatives at Belfast Metropolitan College's Titanic Quarter Campus for the ‘Our Journey So Far’ knowledge and networking event. Swann also said that new figures show the scale of the waiting list crisis and demonstrate the need for multi-year funding.

==== March ====
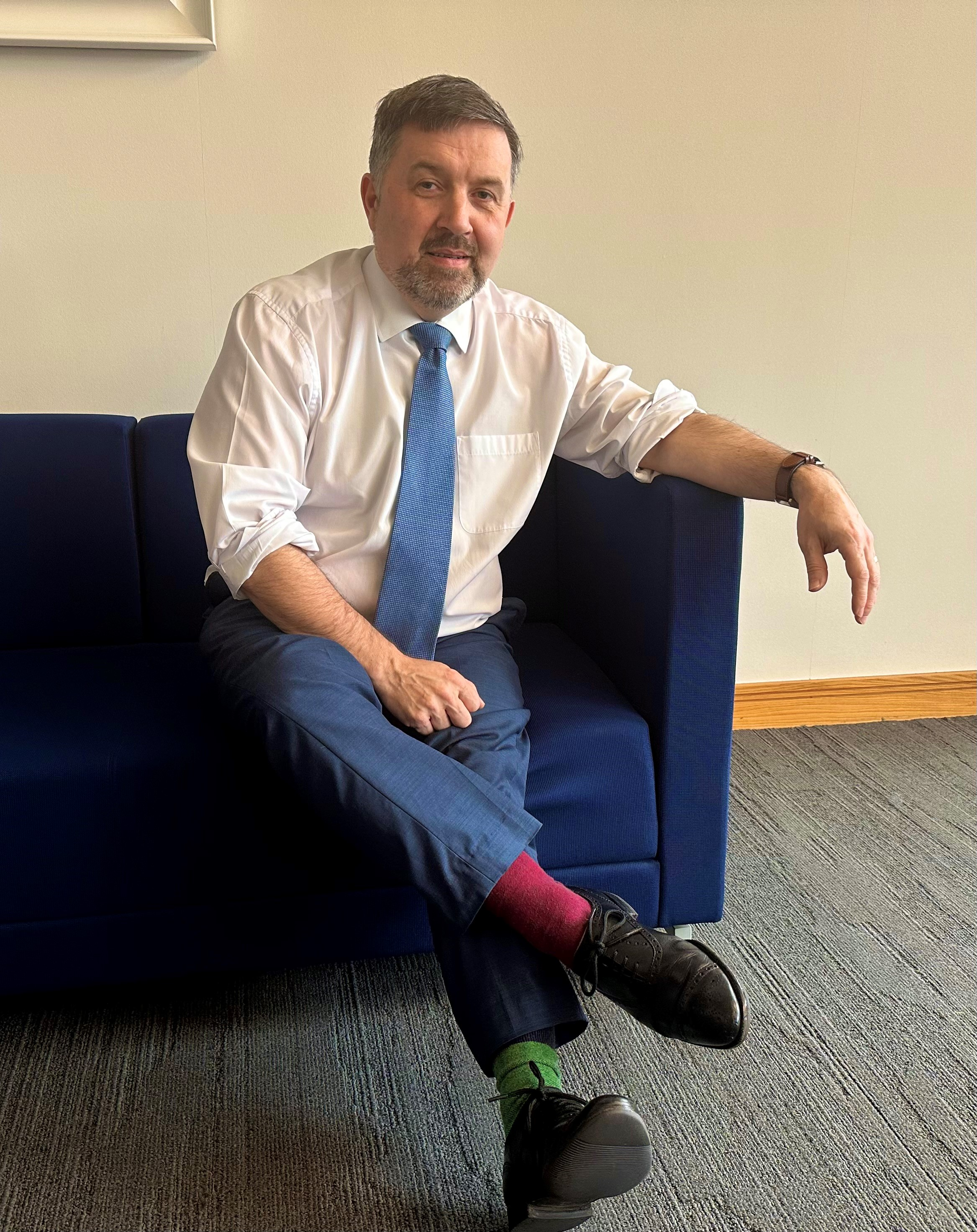
Swann showing his support on World Down Syndrome Day, 21 March 2024, by wearing odd socks

On 4 March 2024, Swann launched the HSC Raising a Concern in the Public Interest (Whistleblowing) Framework & Model Policy. He said that it will facilitate the implementation of policies and procedures within the HSC to fully support staff in raising concerns. He also confirmed a one-year extension of the Department of Health's contract with Nexus for specialist counselling services for victims of sexual abuse.

Swann confirmed that Northern Ireland will be included in new transformational laws to tackle youth smoking and vaping on 5 March 2024. He also announced support from the Department of Health for a large scale public listening exercise on women's health.

On 11 March 2024, Swann launched the Bereaved NI website, offering support for anyone experiencing bereavement.

Swann officially opened a newly renovated GP practice in County Antrim, Toome Surgery, following a £600,000 investment from the Department of Health on 14 March 2024. He also addressed the Northern Ireland Assembly Health Committee, stating that an 'inadequate budget will have real-life consequences.'

On 21 March 2024, Swann praised the innovation and teamwork of staff at the Elective Overnight Stay Centre in Belfast's Mater Hospital.

Swann unveiled a £70m support package for social care providers and hospices on 22 March 2024.

On 26 March 2024, Swann sought a deferral on hospital car parking charges legislation.

Swann announced a £9.2m investment in dental access initiatives for 2024/25 on 27 March 2024. The investment is aimed at bolstering support for dental practices and protecting public access to health service dental care.

On 28 March 2024, Swann praised a new ambulatory unit at Causeway Hospital that will help reduce admission and ED attendances.

Swann praised the innovative thinking at the Centre for Genomic Medicine and highlighted the need to address genomic healthcare challenges while on a visit on 29 March 2024.

==== April ====
Swann announced on 10 April 2024 that vasectomy services in Northern Ireland will be transferred from secondary care to primary care.

On 15 April 2024, Swann met with the All Party Group on Stroke. He said that "important progress" has been achieved on the Stroke Action Plan, but that "much more" remains.

Swann welcomed a new Online Safety Hub for parents, carers, professionals and young people, funded by the Department of Health and developed by the Safeguarding Board for Northern Ireland (SBNI) in partnership with Ineqe Safeguarding Group.

On 21 April 2024, Swann announced his intention to step down as health minister before the Westminster election campaign. He will be the candidate for South Antrim in the 2024 general election.

Swann voted against the Northern Ireland budget on 24 April 2024, saying it was his duty to inform MLAs of the "incredibly serious consequences" of the budget, believing that there was not sufficient funding for the Department of Health. Swann added on 26 April 2024 that a "health service that is actually ravaged by millions of pounds worth of cuts is bad for people's health." Swann has refused to rule out standing down early if the budget agreed by the Executive is passed in its current form.

==== May ====
Swann praised Craigavon Area Hospital staff for their innovative work on 1 May 2024. He met teams working in the Extracorporeal Shock Wave Lithotripsy (ESWL) service and the Post Anaesthetic Care Unit (PACU). Swann also visited Rural Support where he met and had an open discussion with staff. He heard about the health needs and challenges facing those living in rural areas and the farming community. Swann had a comprehensive site tour of Northern Ireland Fire and Rescue Service's Learning and Development College in Cookstown.

On 2 May 2024, Swann visited a new GP-led service to improve lung health in the Armagh/Dungannon area.

Swann visited Donaghcloney GP surgery in County Down to meet practice staff and members of the GP Federation on 3 May 2024. He thanked the team for their commitment to providing vital Primary Care services to more than 4,500 patients in the local community.

On 5 May 2024, Swann praised the "compassion and dedication" of midwives. He paid tribute to the excellent care provided by midwives as he wished them a happy International Day of the Midwife.

Swann welcomed agreement on the General Medical Services contract with GPs for 2024/5 on 7 May 2024, stating that it is "very welcome news." He also announced a new Strategic Plan for Community Pharmacy.

On 8 May 2024, Swann announced that health service and education training places will be maintained at the same level as 2023/24. He also welcomed a new UK-wide plan to tackle antimicrobial resistance. The five-year National Action Plan aims to address AMR instances where standard treatments can become ineffective.

Swann visited Antrim Fire Station to mark that all NIFRS Fire Stations have now been fitted with life-saving defibrillators on 10 May 2024.

On 12 May 2024, Swann praised the "commitment and compassion" of nurses. He thanked nurses for their continued service and wished them a happy International Nurses Day.

Swann met with Fostering Network representatives on 13 May 2024 and welcomed the start of Foster Care Fortnight 2024.

On 15 May 2024, Swann launched a new electronic blood production and tracking system which will help enhance blood safety and quality. He also emphasised the importance of farm family health at the NI Agri-Rural Health Forum at the Balmoral Show. Swann praised the work of the Farm Family Health Checks and highlighted the importance of mental health support for rural communities.

Swann attended a showcasing event hosted by community networks in the Northern locality in partnership with the Public Health Agency. He heard about the great work being done in the area to help tackle health inequalities and improve the health and wellbeing of local communities.

On 20 May 2024, Swann reiterated an apology from the department following publication of the Infected Blood Inquiry report, stating that he is "deeply sorry."

Swann held meetings with Department of Health and Social Care Minister for Public Health Andrea Leadsom and Shadow Health Secretary Wes Streeting on 21 May 2024. Discussions covered the growing budget and demand pressures facing health and social care services in NI. He also welcomed important progress in reducing the number of agency nurses, midwives and healthcare support workers in HSCNI. Swann said agency spend had been reduced by £19m in the last 12 months. Swann also welcomed the motion to include Northern Ireland in the UK Tobacco and Vapes Bill passing in the NI Assembly.

On 22 May 2024, Swann welcomed the UK Government's announcement of further details on compensation arrangements for those infected and/or affected by contaminated blood.

Swann has published an updated Elective Care Framework (ECF) and the final report from the review into General Surgery on 24 May 2024.

==== Resignation ====
On 27 May 2024, UUP leader Doug Beattie wrote to Speaker Edwin Poots to notify him that Swann will resign as Health Minister at midnight on 29 May, after voting against the budget on the 28th. This followed the calling of the general election by Prime Minister Rishi Sunak on 22 May. Swann left office on 28 May 2024 at 11:29pm and was replaced by Mike Nesbitt.

== Personal life ==
Swann is "5ft 3in-ish" tall. He and his wife Jennifer have a daughter and a son. Their son was born with a congenital heart defect; while in Birmingham, Swann recorded the events in a personal blog.

He is a member of the Presbyterian Church and attends church "almost every week." Swann is a member of the Orange Order.

=== Voluntary and community work ===
Swann has served as president and County Antrim Chairman of the Young Farmers' Clubs of Ulster. He has chaired the YFCU's National Executive and Rural Affairs Committees and has been Chairman of the Rural Youth Europe organisation. A former member of Cromkill Pipe Band, Swann was elected an Honorary Vice President of the Royal Scottish Pipe Band Association Northern Ireland. In 2023 Swann was elected Honorary President of the Farmers' Choir Northern Ireland.

== Political views ==
=== Brexit ===
As UUP leader, in May 2019 at the party's European election manifesto launch, Swann stated that a "no deal Brexit must be avoided."

=== Abortion ===
Swann has described himself as "pro-life and ... on record as such." In 2021, Swann defended the delay to introducing full abortion services in Northern Ireland as he could not "set it up without support from the Stormont Executive."

=== Euthanasia ===
Swann has voted against the proposed Terminally Ill Adults (End of Life) Bill at the second and third readings.

== Electoral history ==
Election	Constituency	Votes	%	Elected	Comment
Assembly 2007	North Antrim	1,281	2.89%	Not elected	1st run
Assembly 2011	North Antrim	2,518	6.26%	Elected	5th of 6
Assembly 2016	North Antrim	3,585	8.74%	Elected	5th of 6
Assembly 2017	North Antrim	6,022	12.52%	Elected	2nd of 5, 1st unionist elected
Westminster 2019	North Antrim	8,139	18.5%	Not elected	runner up, increased vote by 11.3%
Assembly 2022	North Antrim	9,530	18.83%	Elected	1st of 5, topped poll
Westminster 2024	South Antrim	16,311	37.85%	Elected	Switched constituencies from North Antrim to South Antrim

== Awards ==
Swann was Awarded Politician of the Year 2022, by Civility in Politics, an award he shared with Chris Bryant MP.

July 2023 Swann was elected an Honorary Fellow of the Royal College of Psychiatrists, fellowships are awarded annually to individuals who have made outstanding contributions to psychiatry. "Robin Swann was awarded for championing mental healthcare and working closely with psychiatrists in Northern Ireland to address the enormous treatment gap that still exists."

October 2025 Swann was elected an Honorary Associate of the British Veterinary Association, the only Northern Ireland MP to achieve this position. BVA President Elisabeth Molyneaux citation stated, "We have been delighted by your commitment to supporting the veterinary profession, notably by hosting our House of Commons briefing event in February.” “We are also grateful for your support on reforming the Veterinary Surgeons Act 1966, and very much appreciate your ongoing interest in, and engagement with, BVA and the veterinary profession.” "

Party political offices
Preceded by Mike Nesbitt	Ulster Unionist Party Leader; 2017–2019	Succeeded by Steve Aiken
Political offices
Preceded by Michelle O'Neill	Minister of Health; 2020–2022, 2024	Succeeded by Mike Nesbitt
Northern Ireland Assembly
Preceded by Robert Coulter	MLA for North Antrim; 2011–2024	Succeeded by Colin Crawford
Preceded by John McCallister	Ulster Unionist Chief Whip; 6 April 2012 – 8 March 2017	Succeeded by Steve Aiken
Preceded by Michaela Boyle	Chair of the Public Accounts Committee; 2016 –2017	Succeeded by William Humphrey
Preceded by Basil McCrea	Chair of the Committee for Employment and Learning; 27 February 2013 – 30 April 2016	Committee abolished
New title	Chair of the Commonwealth Parliamentary Association; Northern Ireland Assembly Branch; 13 April 2015 – 13 June 2016	Succeeded by Jo-Anne Dobson
Preceded by Alex Maskey	Chair of the Chairpersons Liaison Group; October 2013 – September 2014	Succeeded by Patsy McGlone
Preceded by Billy Armstrong	Ulster Unionist Deputy Whip; 9 May 2011 – 6 April 2012	Succeeded by Sandra Overend
Parliament of the United Kingdom
Preceded by Paul Girvan	Member of Parliament for South Antrim; 2024–present	Incumbent
