= Executive Office (Northern Ireland) =

Northern Irish government department

The Executive Office

Department overview
- Formed: 1 December 1999
- Preceding Department: Department of the Prime Minister (1921–72) Northern Ireland Office (1972–99) Office of the Chief Executive (Jan.–May 1974)
- Jurisdiction: Northern Ireland
- Headquarters: Stormont Castle, Stormont Estate, Belfast, BT4 3TT
- Employees: 380 (September 2011)
- Annual budget: £78.6 million (current) & £11.2 million (capital) for 2011–12
- Minister responsible: Michelle O'Neill, MLA; Emma Little-Pengelly, MLA
- Department executive: Moira Doherty, Permanent Secretary
- Website: www.executiveoffice-ni.gov.uk

The Executive Office (TEO) is a devolved Northern Ireland government department in the Northern Ireland Executive with overall responsibility for the running of the Executive. The ministers with overall responsibility for the department are the First Minister and deputy First Minister.

The department was originally known as the Office of the First Minister and deputy First Minister (OFMDFM), with the same capitalisation used in the department's logo. Following a change in policy in 2007 (see First Minister and deputy First Minister), the word "deputy" was then spelt with a lower-case d, but the older version of the name was retained in the logo. In May 2016, the department was renamed The Executive Office as a result of the Fresh Start Agreement.

== Ministers ==
On 3 February 2024, the 6th Executive of Northern Ireland was formed. Michelle O'Neill (Sinn Féin) was appointed First Minister, and Emma Little-Pengelly (Democratic Unionist Party) was appointed deputy First Minister.

Aisling Reilly (Sinn Féin) and Joanne Bunting (Democratic Unionist Party) serve as junior Ministers.

== Responsibilities ==
The overall aim of The Executive Office (TEO) is to "deliver a peaceful, fair, equal and prosperous society". Its key stated objectives include: "driving investment and sustainable development"; "Tackling disadvantage and promoting equality of opportunity"; and the "effective operation of the institutions of government".

TEO has the following main responsibilities:

- administrative support for the Northern Ireland Executive (co-chaired by the First Minister and deputy First Minister)
- children and young people
- equality of opportunity and good relations
- emergency planning
- infrastructure investment
- international relations
- liaison with the Northern Ireland Assembly, the North/South Ministerial Council, the British-Irish Council, the Civic Forum for Northern Ireland (suspended) and departments of the UK Government
- poverty and social exclusion
- sustainable development
- victims and survivors of the Troubles

TEO's main counterparts in the United Kingdom Government are:

- the Northern Ireland Office (oversees the devolution settlement);
- the Cabinet Office (on the machinery of government and honours);
- the Department for Communities and Local Government (on community relations and emergency planning);
- the Government Equalities Office;
- the Department for Environment, Food and Rural Affairs (on sustainable development);
- the Foreign and Commonwealth Office (on international relations).

== History ==
The office's first logo, used until the name change to The Executive Office in May 2016

A Prime Minister of Northern Ireland was officially appointed on the creation of the Government of Northern Ireland in June 1921, supported by the Department of the Prime Minister; however, the office was abolished in March 1972, on the suspension of the Parliament of Northern Ireland and the introduction of direct rule.

The Northern Ireland (Temporary Provisions) Act 1972 transferred the powers of the Prime Minister to the Secretary of State for Northern Ireland within the British Government. A Chief Executive of Northern Ireland briefly held office in the 1974 Northern Ireland Executive. The Secretary of State was supported by the Northern Ireland Office (NIO), which was responsible for security and political affairs during the Troubles.

Following a referendum on the Belfast Agreement on 23 May 1998 and the granting of royal assent to the Northern Ireland Act 1998 on 19 November 1998, a Northern Ireland Assembly and Northern Ireland Executive were established by the United Kingdom Government under Prime Minister Tony Blair. The process was known as devolution and was set up to return devolved legislative powers to Northern Ireland. OFMDFM was one of five new devolved Northern Ireland departments created in December 1999 by the Northern Ireland Act 1998 and The Departments (Northern Ireland) Order 1999.

The First Minister and deputy First Minister first took office on 2 December 1999. Devolution was suspended for four periods, during which the department came under the responsibility of direct rule ministers from the Northern Ireland Office:

- between 12 February 2000 and 30 May 2000;
- on 11 August 2001;
- on 22 September 2001;
- between 15 October 2002 and 8 May 2007.

== See also ==
- First Minister and deputy First Minister
- Committee for the Executive Office
- Northern Ireland Bureau
- Office of the Northern Ireland Executive in Brussels
- Commissioner for Older People for Northern Ireland
