= Commissioner for Older People for Northern Ireland =

Non-departmental public body

The Commissioner for Older People for Northern Ireland is set up as a non-departmental public body, established by the Commissioner for Older People Act (Northern Ireland) 2011. The Commissioner has a number of legal functions and powers directly linked to the legislation.

== Organisation ==
The Commissioner's office is sponsored by the Executive Office of Northern Ireland. The Commissioner is independent and the principal aim of their office is to safeguard and promote the interests of older people. The current Commissioner for Older People for Northern Ireland is Eddie Lynch.

== Powers ==
The Commissioner can take a judicial review regarding the treatment of older people to court.

== Advocacy ==
The Commissioner advocates on behalf of older people at the level of individual cases, mass communication and high-level policy.

== See also ==
- Older People's Commissioner for Wales
