= Older People's Commissioner for Wales =

Older people's rights representative in Wales

The Older People's Commissioner for Wales (Welsh: Comisiynydd Pobl Hŷn Cymru) is responsible for protecting older people's rights as set out in the United Nations Principles for Older Persons.

The Commissioner's function is to advocate for the rights of people older than 60 and other people who use services for older people in Wales.

The Older People's Commissioner has a team of staff based in Cardiff.

The Commissioner has successfully advocated for a number of policies including free prescription charges. The Welsh Government released a policy strategy document, "Older People's Strategy" as recommended by the Commissioner.

The Commissioner is the first older people's commissioner anywhere in the world.

Legislation includes the Commissioner for Older People (Wales) Act 2006.

== See also ==
- Commissioner for Older People for Northern Ireland
