= Executive of the 7th Northern Ireland Assembly =

Northern Ireland Executive (2022-)

- 6th Executive of Northern Ireland
- February 2024 – present
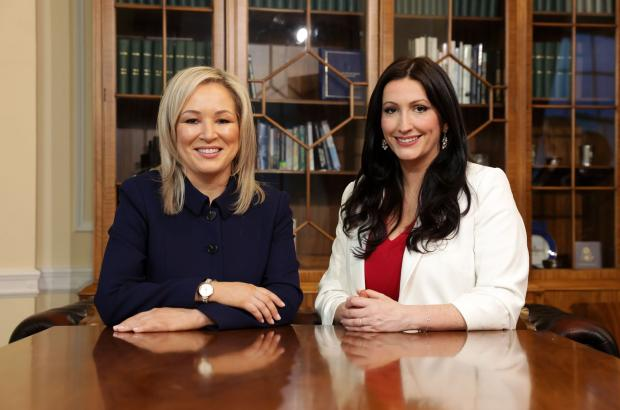
- O'Neill and Little-Pengelly in 2024
- Date formed: 3 February 2024

People and organisations
- Head of state: Charles III
- Co-heads of government: Michelle O'Neill (First Minister); Emma Little-Pengelly (deputy First Minister)
- Total no. of members: 10 (+ 2 junior ministers)
- Member party: Sinn Féin; DUP; Alliance; UUP
- Status in legislature: Power–sharing coalition
- Opposition party: SDLP
- Opposition leader: Matthew O'Toole

History
- Incoming formation: 2024 Northern Ireland Executive formation
- Election: 2022 Assembly election
- Legislature term: 7th Assembly
- Predecessor: Executive of the 6th Assembly

The 6th Executive of Northern Ireland was appointed on 3 February 2024, following the 2022 election to the seventh Northern Ireland Assembly held on 5 May 2022 and the protracted negotiations leading up to the 2024 Northern Ireland Executive formation. The newly elected assembly met for the first time on 13 May 2022. It is led by Michelle O'Neill of Sinn Féin as First Minister and Emma Little-Pengelly of the DUP as deputy First Minister.

== Formation discussions ==
As leader of the largest party in the Assembly, Sinn Féin's Michelle O'Neill is expected by commentators to be the leading candidate for the First Minister office, with the party entitled to make the only nomination to the position. Her election would rely on the Democratic Unionist Party's agreement to sit on the executive, and serve in the Assembly, something which is in doubt since the party's previous First Minister Paul Givan resigned the post in February 2022, in protest over the Northern Ireland Protocol of the Brexit agreement, the implementation of which unionists have objected to.

Sir Jeffrey Donaldson, DUP leader and Member of Parliament for Lagan Valley secured an MLA position in the eponymous constituency, becoming the presumed choice for deputy First Minister, but has since announced that the DUP leadership team would decide if he would take that seat, (and thus call a by-election for his Westminster seat), or appoint a proxy. On 12 May, the day before the first scheduled sitting day of the Assembly, Donaldson announced his decision to remain as an MP, and formally co-opted former MP for Belfast South and MLA for Belfast South, Emma Little-Pengelly, to take his seat in the Assembly.

The DUP refused to assent to the election of a Speaker on 13 May in further protest to the Northern Ireland Protocol, so the Assembly could not continue to other business, including the appointment of a fresh Executive. The Speaker and incumbent ministers from the previous Assembly continued in office in caretaker capacity, a new arrangement introduced by the New Decade, New Approach agreement, but this provision expired in October 2022.

On 30 January 2024, leader of the DUP Jeffrey Donaldson announced that the DUP would allow the formation of the institutions on the condition that new legislation was passed by the UK House of Commons.

== 6th Executive of Northern Ireland ==
Northern Ireland Executive
Portfolio	Minister	Party	Term
Executive Ministers
First Minister	Michelle O'Neill	Sinn Féin	2024–present
Deputy First Minister	Emma Little-Pengelly	DUP	2024–present
Agriculture, Environment and Rural Affairs	Andrew Muir	Alliance	2024–present
Communities	Gordon Lyons	DUP	2024–present
Economy	Caoimhe Archibald	Sinn Féin	2025 - present
Education	Paul Givan	DUP	2024–present
Finance	John O'Dowd	Sinn Féin	2025 - present
Health	Robbie Butler	UUP	2026–present
Infrastructure	Liz Kimmins	Sinn Féin	2025 - present
Justice	Naomi Long	Alliance	2024–present
Also attending Executive meetings
Junior Minister (assisting the First Minister)	Aisling Reilly	Sinn Féin	2024–present
Junior Minister (assisting the deputy First Minister)	Pam Cameron	DUP	2024–present
=== Changes 8 May 2024 ===
Economy	Deirdre Hargey	Sinn Féin	2024 (interim)
=== Changes 28 May 2024 ===
Economy	Conor Murphy	Sinn Féin	2024–2025
Health	Mike Nesbitt	UUP	2024–2026
=== Changes 3 February 2025 ===
Economy	Caoimhe Archibald	Sinn Féin	2025–present
Finance	John O'Dowd	Sinn Féin	2025–present
Infrastructure	Liz Kimmins	Sinn Féin	2025–present
=== Changes 29 September 2025 ===
Junior Minister (assisting the deputy First Minister)	Joanne Bunting	DUP	2025–present
=== Changes 18 August 2026 ===
Health	Mike Nesbitt	UUP	2024–2026
=== Changes 20 August 2026 ===
Health	Robbie Butler	UUP	2026–present

== See also ==
- List of Northern Ireland Executives
- 7th Northern Ireland Assembly
