= First Minister and Deputy First Minister of Northern Ireland =

Joint heads of government of Northern Ireland

- Irish: Céad-Aire agus leasChéad-Aire Thuaisceart Éireann; Ulster Scots: First Meinister an First Meinister Depute o Norlin Airlann
- Logo of the Executive Office

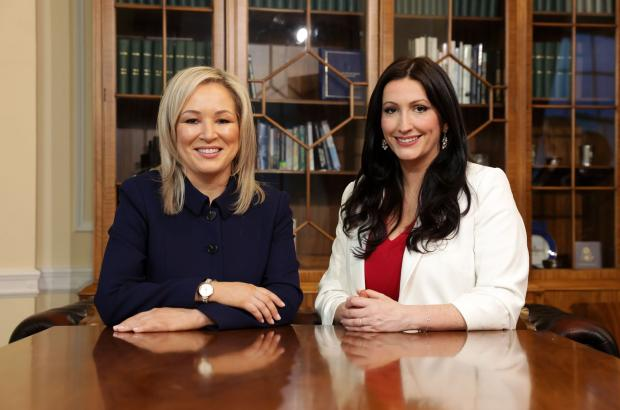
- Incumbent; Michelle O'Neill & Emma Little-Pengelly since 3 February 2024
- Northern Ireland Executive; Executive Office
- Member of: Northern Ireland Assembly; Northern Ireland Executive; British–Irish Council; PM and Heads of Devolved Governments Council; Council of the Nations and Regions
- Nominator: Largest political party in each of the two largest community designations within the Northern Ireland Assembly
- Precursor: Prime Minister of Northern Ireland (1921–1972); Chief and deputy-Chief Executive (1 Jan – 28 May 1974)
- Inaugural holder: David Trimble; Seamus Mallon
- Formation: 1 July 1998
- Salary: £120,000 each (includes MLA salary)
- Website: www.executiveoffice-ni.gov.uk

The first minister and deputy first minister of Northern Ireland are the joint heads of government of Northern Ireland, leading the Northern Ireland Executive and with overall responsibility for the running of the Executive Office.

Despite the titles of the two offices, the two positions have the same governmental power, resulting in a diarchy; the deputy first minister is not subordinate to the first minister. Created under the terms of the 1998 Good Friday Agreement, both were initially nominated and appointed by members of the Northern Ireland Assembly on a joint ticket by a cross-community vote, under consociational principles. That process was changed following the 2006 St Andrews Agreement, such that the first minister now is nominated by the largest party overall, and the deputy first minister is nominated by the largest party from the next largest community block (understood to mean "Unionist", "Nationalist", or "Other").

On 17 June 2021, despite a letter from the Democratic Unionist Party chairman and other senior party members, DUP leader Edwin Poots nominated Paul Givan as First Minister and Sinn Féin re-nominated Michelle O'Neill as Deputy First Minister. On 4 February 2022, Givan resigned as First Minister, which led to O'Neill automatically ceasing to hold office as Deputy First Minister. The offices remained vacant until the appointment of O'Neill as First Minister, the first Irish nationalist to be appointed to the position, and DUP's Emma Little-Pengelly as deputy First Minister, on 3 February 2024.

== Responsibilities ==
The first minister and deputy first minister share equal responsibilities within government, and their decisions are made jointly. The first minister is, though, the first to greet official visitors to Northern Ireland and shares the same title as their counterparts in Scotland and Wales. Specifically, they are tasked with co-chairing meetings of the Northern Ireland Executive, "dealing with and co-ordinating" the work of the Executive, and the response of the administration to external relationships.

The first minister and deputy first minister agree the agenda of Executive meetings and can jointly determine "significant or controversial matters" to be considered by the Executive.

The ministers' policy responsibilities include:

- economic policy
- equality before the law
- European Union issues
- human rights
- the machinery of government (including the Ministerial Code)
- public appointments policy
- standards in public life

Two junior ministers assist the first minister and deputy first minister in carrying out the work of Executive Office. They are jointly accountable to the first minister and deputy first minister. The incumbent junior ministers are Aisling Reilly (Sinn Féin) and Joanne Bunting (Democratic Unionist Party).

== Election ==
As originally established under the Northern Ireland Act 1998, the first minister was elected by the Assembly on a joint ticket with the deputy first minister through a cross-community vote. It was created to enable the leaders of the main unionist and nationalist parties to work together, with guaranteed joint representation of both main communities. For the purposes of a cross-community vote, MLAs were designated as unionist, nationalist, or other.

The nominees for First Minister and Deputy First Minister required the support of:

- a majority of the MLAs voting in the election overall;
- a majority of the designated unionist MLAs voting; and
- a majority of the designated nationalist MLAs voting.

This procedure was used on 2 December 1999 to elect David Trimble (Ulster Unionist Party, UUP) and Seamus Mallon (Social Democratic and Labour Party, SDLP). Following several suspensions of the Northern Ireland Executive, Trimble was not re-elected on 2 November 2001 due to opposition from other unionist parties. He was subsequently re-elected alongside Mark Durkan (SDLP) on 6 November 2001; on that occasion, three Alliance Party of Northern Ireland MLAs redesignated from 'other' to 'unionist' to support Trimble's nomination.

Following the St Andrews Agreement in October 2006, the appointment procedure was changed to allow for:

- a First Minister nominated by the largest party of the largest designation;
- a Deputy First Minister nominated by the largest party of the second largest designation.

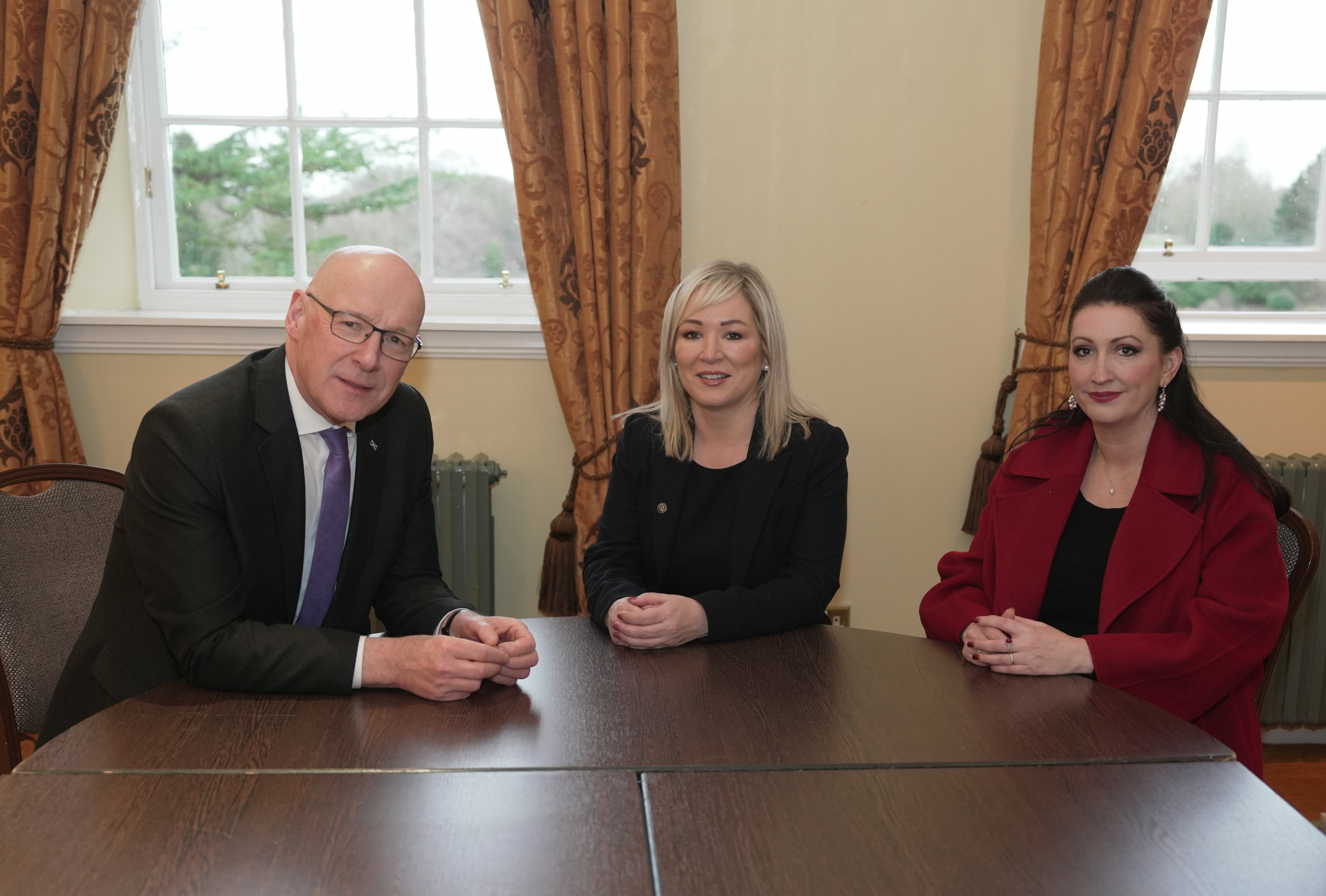
First Minister O'Neill and Deputy FM Little-Pengelly meet with First Minister of Scotland, John Swinney, at the 42nd British-Irish Council summit, 2024

This procedure, which removed the need for a joint ticket between the unionist Democratic Unionist Party and the nationalist Sinn Féin party, was used to appoint Ian Paisley and Martin McGuinness on 8 May 2007. It was again used to appoint Peter Robinson (DUP) alongside McGuinness on 5 June 2008 and again on 12 May 2011, and to appoint Arlene Foster (DUP) alongside McGuinness on 11 January 2016, also to appoint Foster alongside Michelle O'Neill on 11 January 2020, as well as to appoint Paul Givan alongside O'Neill on 17 June 2021.

The new rules from 2006 also state that, if the largest party of the largest designation happens not to also be the largest party in the assembly overall, then the appointment procedure would be as follows:

- a First Minister nominated by the largest party overall;
- a Deputy First Minister nominated by the largest party of the largest designation.

This method of selection was first used in 2024, after the DUP ended its Stormont boycott following agreed changes with the UK government regarding post-Brexit trading relations affected by the Northern Ireland protocol and the implementation of the Windsor Framework. Sinn Féin was the largest party in the Assembly after the 2022 Assembly Election, but the Unionist parties were the largest designation in the assembly.

The Department of Justice is now the only Northern Ireland Executive minister elected by cross-community vote. All other ministers are party appointees, with parties taking turns using the D'Hondt method.

== Vacancy ==
The first minister or deputy first minister may also appoint another Northern Ireland Executive Minister to exercise the functions of the office during a vacancy, currently for a continuous period up to six weeks.

Vacancies have occurred on four occasions to date:

First Minister

- Reg Empey for David Trimble (1 July 2001 – 6 November 2001)
- Arlene Foster for Peter Robinson (11 January 2010 – 3 February 2010)
- Arlene Foster for Peter Robinson (10 September 2015 – 20 October 2015)

Deputy First Minister

- John O'Dowd for Martin McGuinness (20 September 2011 – 31 October 2011)

== Terminology ==
=== Titles in Irish and Ulster Scots ===
In the Irish language, the literal translation of these positions is "Céad-Aire agus an leas Chéad-Aire". The titles appear in both English and Irish in published literature by the North-South Ministerial Council, one of the "mutually inter-dependent" institutions laid out in the Good Friday Agreement, along with the Northern Ireland Assembly.

Various ways of translating the titles "First Minister and deputy First Minister" into the Ulster Scots dialects have been attested in official communications, including Heid Männystèr an tha Heid Männystèr depute, First Meinister an First Meinister depute, First Meenister an First Meenister depute and First Minister an First Minister depute.

=== Capitalisation of "deputy" ===
The second position has been written as "Deputy" or "deputy" First Minister, due to differing preferences by civil servants (and potentially ministers), although the capitalisation of the title has no constitutional consequences in practice.

The first two holders of the office, Seamus Mallon and Mark Durkan, were both referred to during their periods of office as "Deputy First Minister", with a capital 'D'. In the Good Friday Agreement, also known as the Belfast Agreement, which established the executive in Northern Ireland, the two positions are spelt "First Minister and Deputy First Minister" (with a capital 'D'). This was also adopted in 1999 for the logo of the OFMDFM. Several weeks after Martin McGuinness took up office as Deputy First Minister in 2007, civil servants in his department began asking the Assembly's Hansard team to replace the capital 'D' with a lower-case 'd', pointing out that the title was rendered that way in the Northern Ireland Act 1998, the legislation which established the office. Some believe that the case change was advocated to highlight the fact that the position holds the same power as the position of First Minister, but a spokesman for McGuinness said that neither McGuinness nor his advisers had asked for the change. Speaker William Hay ordered the change and the capital 'D' was no longer used in Hansard references.

Officials edited the department's archive of press releases to make that change (despite its use by Mallon and Durkan when in office) but the capital 'D' still appears in some places, and a spokesman confirmed on 20 March 2008 that the office had "no plans" to change the OFMDFM logo. However, the Assembly committee that scrutinises their work is now listed as the "Committee for the Office of the First Minister and deputy First Minister". Ultimately it was decided that McGuinness should be referred to as the deputy First Minister, unless all the other letters in the title are in capitals.

In official language, the positions are sometimes abbreviated to FM/DFM or FM/dFM.

=== Alternative titles for the deputy First Minister ===
Sinn Féin started using the phrases "Joint First Minister" and "Co-First Minister" in 2009 to describe the deputy first minister to highlight the fact that the First Minister and deputy first minister operated in tandem. Martin McGuinness used the term Joint First Minister himself when he arrived for a meeting of the North/South Ministerial Council in February 2009; the DUP denounced the term as "republican speak" and it is not used in legislation. Jim Allister, the leader of the Traditional Unionist Voice, long called Robinson and McGuinness "the joint first ministers", to highlight the joint nature of the office and to demonstrate his opposition to the power-sharing arrangements.

With the restoration of power-sharing in 2020, Sinn Féin started describing the position as "joint head of government".

== History ==
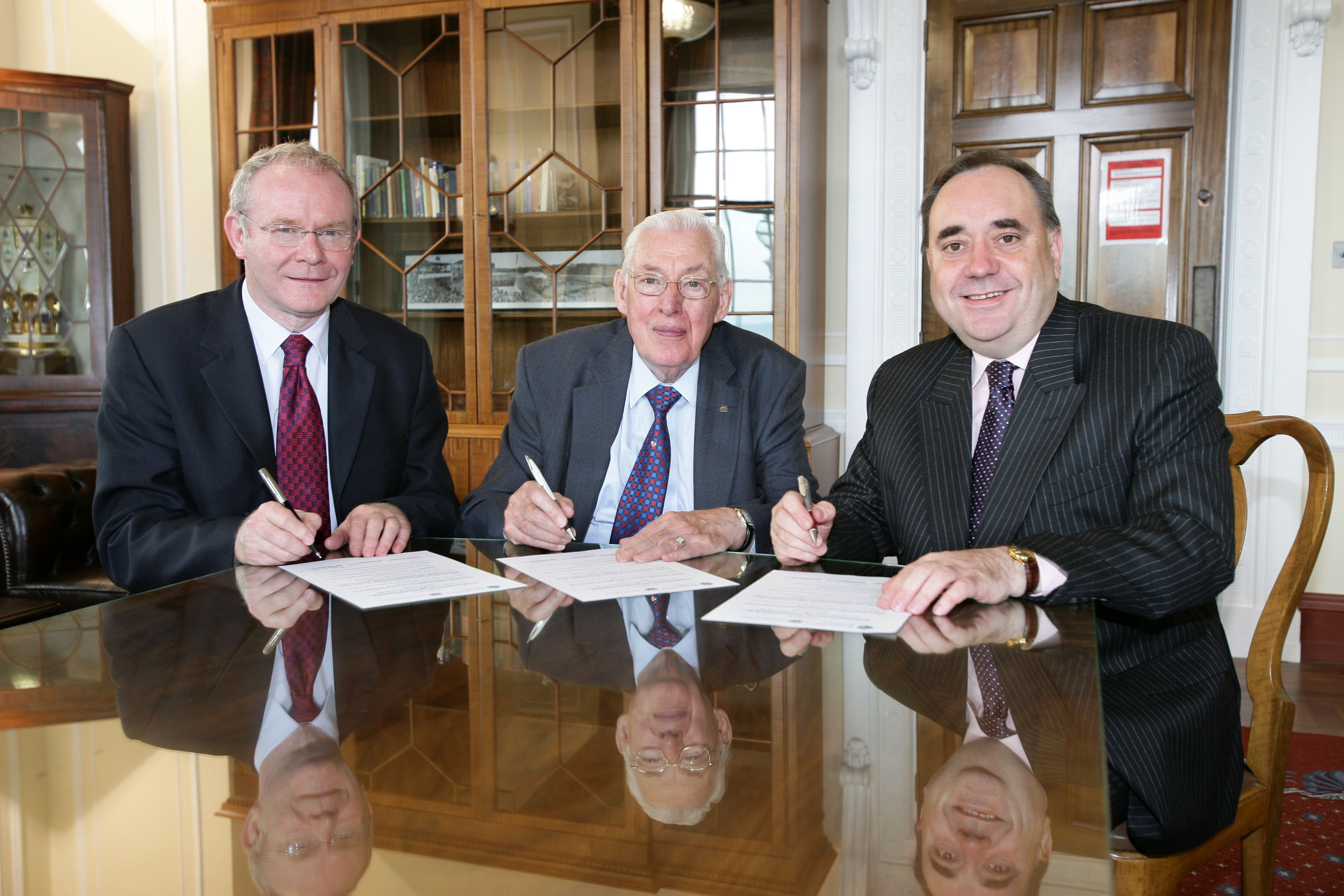
Alex Salmond (right) meets Ian Paisley (centre) and Martin McGuinness in 2008.

Following a referendum on the Belfast Agreement on 23 May 1998 and subsequent the Northern Ireland Act 1998, the Northern Ireland Assembly was established in 1998 with a view to assuming devolved powers from the Westminster Parliament. On 1 July 1998, David Trimble (UUP) and Seamus Mallon (SDLP) were nominated and elected First Minister and Deputy First Minister designates respectively. Eventually, on 2 December 1999, power was devolved and Trimble and Mallon formally took office as joint heads of the Northern Ireland Executive.

On 6 November 2001, Mark Durkan (SDLP) became Deputy First Minister after Seamus Mallon's retirement. The Executive and the two positions were suspended between 15 October 2002 and 8 May 2007 following a breakdown in trust between the parties.

On 8 May 2007, Ian Paisley (DUP) and Martin McGuinness (Sinn Féin) were appointed First Minister and Deputy First Minister respectively in line with the agreement between their two parties on 26 March 2007.

Paisley stated his intention to resign on 4 March 2008. His Deputy as DUP leader, Peter Robinson was ratified as Democratic Unionist Party leader designate on 17 April 2008 and became First Minister on 5 June 2008. Arlene Foster succeeded Peter Robinson as DUP leader on 18 December 2015, and as First Minister on 11 January 2016.

After more than 20 DUP MLAs and four DUP MPs signed a letter "... voicing no confidence in her leadership", Foster resigned as party leader on 28 May 2021, and as First Minister in June 2021. Her successor as the leader of the Democratic Unionist Party, Edwin Poots, said he would not become the First Minister. Instead, DUP MLA Paul Givan was nominated for First Minister by Poots. Despite concerns by Sinn Féin that an Irish Language Act would not pass, following talks with the British government they agreed to renominate Michelle O'Neill for Deputy First Minister. However, 24 of the DUP's 28 MLAs voted against Givan, leading to Poots' resignation as party leader.

Separately, between 12 February 2000 and 30 May 2000, and 15 October 2002 and 8 May 2007, however, devolution was suspended, and along with it the offices of First Minister and Deputy First Minister. The Office of the First Minister and Deputy First Minister became the responsibility of the Secretary of State for Northern Ireland. There were also two 24-hour periods of suspension on 11 August 2001 and 22 September 2001. to allow timetables for negotiation to restart. Devolution was suspended from 10 January 2017 to 10 January 2020.

== First Ministers and Deputy First Ministers ==
=== Parties ===
Ulster Unionist Party Social Democratic and Labour Party Democratic Unionist Party Sinn Féin

| First Minister of Northern Ireland | | | | Deputy First Minister of Northern Ireland | | | | Executive | Elections |
| Name (Birth–Death) Constituency | Portrait | Term of office | | Name (Birth–Death) Constituency | Portrait | Term of office | | Executive | Elections |
|---|---|---|---|---|---|---|---|---|---|
| David Trimble (1944–2022); Upper Bann | | 1 July 1998 | 1 July 2001 | Seamus Mallon (1936–2020); Newry and Armagh | | 1 July 1998 | 6 November 2001 | First Executive | 1998 |
| Reg Empey (b. 1947); Belfast East | | 1 July 2001 (acting) | 6 November 2001 | Seamus Mallon (1936–2020); Newry and Armagh | | 1 July 1998 | 6 November 2001 | First Executive | 1998 |
| David Trimble (1944–2022); Upper Bann | | 6 November 2001 | 14 October 2002 | Mark Durkan (b. 1960); Foyle | | 6 November 2001 | 14 October 2002 | First Executive | 1998 |
| Offices vacant (14 October 2002 – 8 May 2007) | | | | | | | | | 1998 |
| Offices vacant (14 October 2002 – 8 May 2007) | | | | | | | | | 2003 |
| Ian Paisley (1926–2014); North Antrim | | 8 May 2007 | 5 June 2008 | Martin McGuinness (1950–2017); Mid Ulster | | 8 May 2007 | 20 September 2011 | Second Executive | 2007 |
| Peter Robinson (b. 1948); Belfast East | | 5 June 2008 | 11 January 2010 | Martin McGuinness (1950–2017); Mid Ulster | | 8 May 2007 | 20 September 2011 | Second Executive | 2007 |
| Arlene Foster (b. 1970); Fermanagh and South Tyrone | | 11 January 2010 (acting) | 3 February 2010 | Martin McGuinness (1950–2017); Mid Ulster | | 8 May 2007 | 20 September 2011 | Second Executive | 2007 |
| Peter Robinson (b. 1948); Belfast East | | 3 February 2010 | 10 September 2015 | Martin McGuinness (1950–2017); Mid Ulster | | 8 May 2007 | 20 September 2011 | Second Executive | 2007 |
| Peter Robinson (b. 1948); Belfast East | | 3 February 2010 | 10 September 2015 | John O'Dowd (b. 1967); Upper Bann | | 20 September 2011 (acting) | 31 October 2011 | Third Executive | 2011 |
| Peter Robinson (b. 1948); Belfast East | | 3 February 2010 | 10 September 2015 | Martin McGuinness (1950–2017); Mid Ulster | | 31 October 2011 | 9 January 2017 | Third Executive | 2011 |
| Arlene Foster (b. 1970); Fermanagh and South Tyrone | | 10 September 2015 (acting) | 20 October 2015 | Martin McGuinness (1950–2017); Mid Ulster | | 31 October 2011 | 9 January 2017 | Third Executive | 2011 |
| Peter Robinson (b. 1948); Belfast East | | 20 October 2015 | 11 January 2016 | Martin McGuinness (1950–2017); Mid Ulster | | 31 October 2011 | 9 January 2017 | Third Executive | 2011 |
| Arlene Foster (b. 1970); Fermanagh and South Tyrone | | 11 January 2016 | 9 January 2017 | Martin McGuinness (1950–2017); Mid Ulster | | 31 October 2011 | 9 January 2017 | Fourth Executive | 2016 |
| Offices vacant (9 January 2017 – 11 January 2020) | | | | | | | | | 2016 |
| Offices vacant (9 January 2017 – 11 January 2020) | | | | | | | | | 2017 |
| Arlene Foster (b. 1970); Fermanagh and South Tyrone | | 11 January 2020 | 14 June 2021 | Michelle O'Neill (b. 1977); Mid Ulster | | 11 January 2020 | 14 June 2021 | Fifth Executive | 2017 |
| Paul Givan (b. 1981); Lagan Valley | | 17 June 2021 | 4 February 2022 | Michelle O'Neill (b. 1977); Mid Ulster | | 17 June 2021 | 4 February 2022 | Fifth Executive | 2017 |
| Offices vacant (4 February 2022 – 3 February 2024) | | | | | | | | | 2017 |
| Offices vacant (4 February 2022 – 3 February 2024) | | | | | | | | | 2022 |
| Michelle O'Neill (b. 1977); Mid Ulster | | 3 February 2024 | Incumbent | Emma Little-Pengelly (b. 1979); Lagan Valley | | 3 February 2024 | Incumbent | Sixth Executive | 2022 |

=== Direct-rule First Ministers ===
During the periods of suspension, the Secretaries of State for Northern Ireland assumed the responsibilities of the first minister and deputy first minister.

| Name | Portrait | Party | Term start | Term end |
|---|---|---|---|---|
| John Reid | | Labour | 14 October 2002 | 24 October 2002 |
| Paul Murphy | | Labour | 24 October 2002 | 6 May 2005 |
| Peter Hain | | Labour | 6 May 2005 | 8 May 2007 |

== See also ==
- Executive Office
- junior Minister (Northern Ireland)
- List of current heads of government in the United Kingdom and dependencies
- List of government ministers in Northern Ireland
- Northern Ireland Executive
