= Jemma Dolan =

Irish politictian (born 1990)

Jemma Dolan MLA
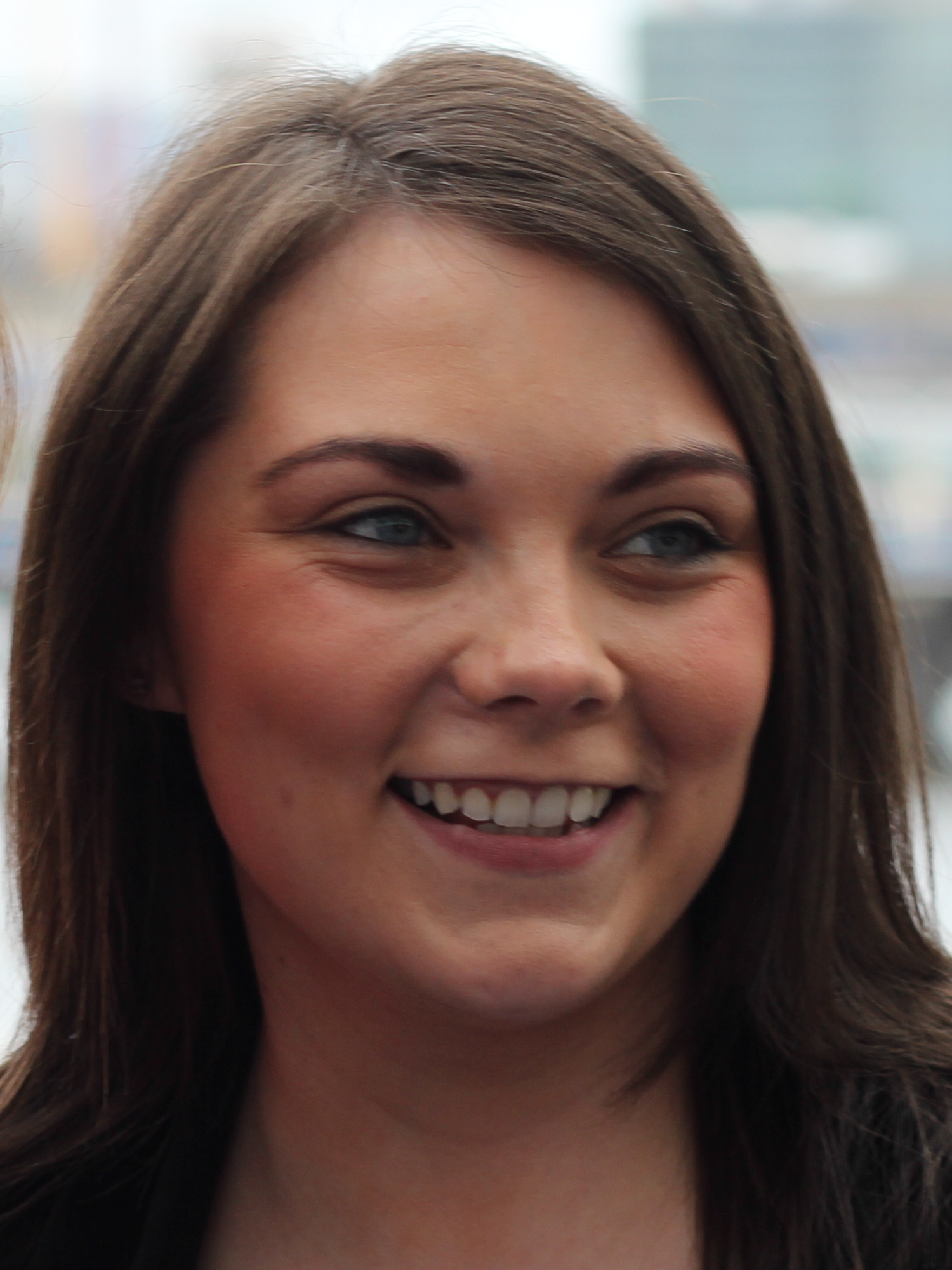

Member of the Northern Ireland Assembly for Fermanagh and South Tyrone
- Incumbent
- Assumed office 2 March 2017
- Preceded by: Richie McPhillips

Personal details
- Born: Belleek, County Fermanagh, Northern Ireland
- Party: Sinn Féin
- Spouse: Conor Fearon
- Website: Jemma Dolan MLA

Jemma Dolan (born 10 September 1990) is an Irish Sinn Féin politician, serving as a Member of the Northern Ireland Assembly (MLA) for Fermanagh and South Tyrone since 2017.

== Before Politics ==
From Belleek, County Fermanagh, Dolan previously worked for Sinn Féin in the EU Parliament and in Fermanagh and South Tyrone and is involved with her local GAA club. She is also a former independent member of the Fermanagh and Omagh Policing and Community Safety Partnership.

Dolan is a former vice president for Campaigns and Communications for the University of Ulster Students Union. Whilst in this role in 2014 she won the Welfare Campaign of the Year Award at the Student Achievement Awards Ireland for setting up a student mental health project.

== Northern Ireland Assembly elections ==
Having never stood for political office before, the first time candidate polled 7,767 first preference votes, securing her MLA seat on the third count alongside her more established Sinn Féin running mate Michelle Gildernew. Her other more established Sinn Féin colleague, Seán Lynch, got elected on the fourth count.

Jemma Dolan was once again selected by Sinn Féin to run for the 2022 Assembly election in the Fermanagh and South Tyrone constituency. She topped the poll, polling 9,067 first preference votes, and was elected on the first count. Her two running mates, Colm Gildernew and Áine Murphy, were elected on count eight after garnering 7,562 and 7,379 first preferences respectively.

== Assembly career ==
Dolan currently sits on two Assembly Committees, the Committee for Finance and the Public Accounts Committee. She is also the Vice Chair of the All-Party Group on Eating Disorders and Disordered Eating and also sits on the All Party Group on Further and Higher Education, the All-Party Group on Domestic and Sexual Violence, the All-Party Group on International Development, the All-Party Group on Carers, the All-Party Group on Ageing and Older People and the All Party Group on Suicide Prevention.

Northern Ireland Assembly
Preceded by Richie McPhillips	MLA for Fermanagh and South Tyrone; 2017–present	Incumbent
