= Junior Minister (Northern Ireland) =

Government position

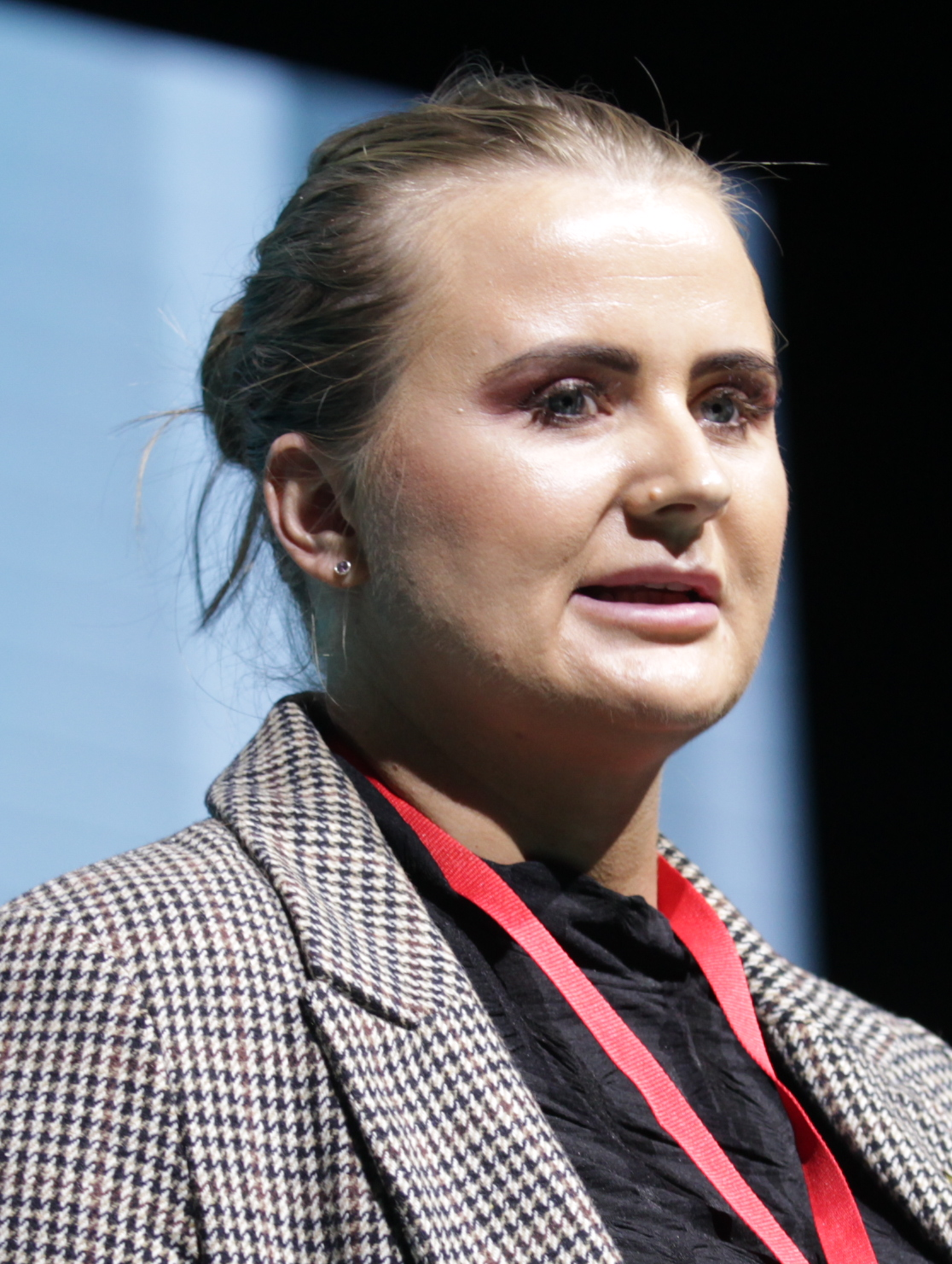
Aisling Reilly is the incumbent junior Minister of Northern Ireland.

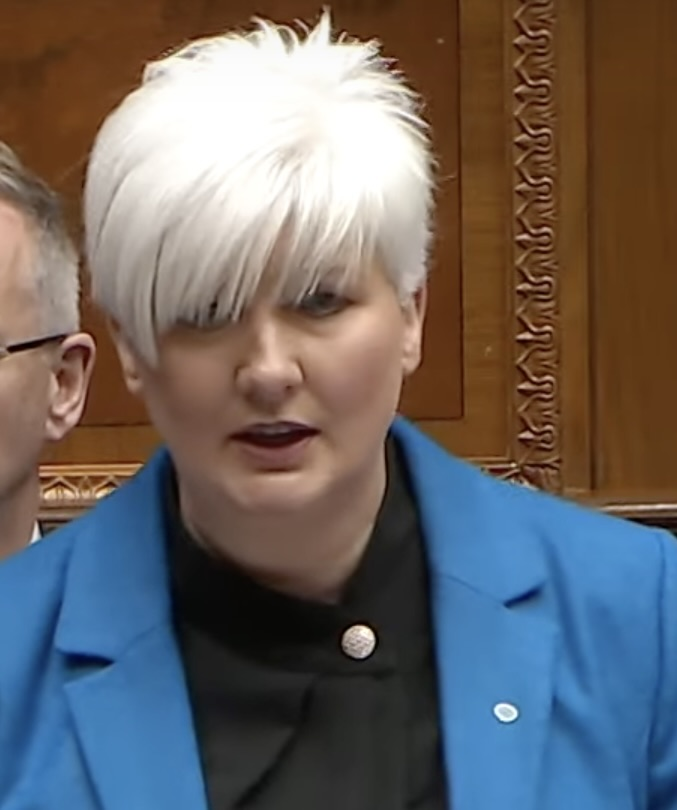
Joanne Bunting is the incumbent junior Minister of Northern Ireland.

The term junior Minister (Irish: aire sóisearach), in Northern Ireland, is the name given to two positions in the Executive Office, a department in the Northern Ireland Executive answerable to the First Minister and deputy First Minister.

The positions have been filled by Aisling Reilly since 3 February 2024 and Joanne Bunting since 15 September 2025.

Under the Northern Ireland Act 1998, the First Minister and deputy First Minister acting jointly may determine that a number of members of the Northern Ireland Assembly shall be appointed as junior ministers.

The salary of each junior minister in 2007–2008 (when devolution was restored) was £60,067.42, which decreased to the current level of £55,000.00 in 2016.

The Social Democratic and Labour Party (SDLP) called for the immediate abolition of the junior minister positions in its 2011 Northern Ireland Assembly election manifesto.

== Junior Ministers ==
=== Nominated by the First Minister ===
Minister	Image	Party	Took office	Left office
Dermot Nesbitt		UUP	15 December 1999	11 February 2000
Office suspended				
Dermot Nesbitt		UUP	30 May 2000	20 February 2002
James Leslie		UUP	20 February 2002	14 October 2002
Office suspended				
Ian Paisley, Jr.		DUP	8 May 2007	26 February 2008
Jeffrey Donaldson		DUP	26 February 2008	1 July 2009
Robin Newton		DUP	1 July 2009	16 May 2011
Jonathan Bell		DUP	16 May 2011	11 May 2015
Michelle McIlveen		DUP	11 May 2015	28 October 2015
Emma Pengelly		DUP	28 October 2015	25 May 2016
Alastair Ross		DUP	25 May 2016	9 January 2017
Office suspended				
Gordon Lyons		DUP	11 January 2020	2 February 2021
Gary Middleton		DUP	2 February 2021 (Acting)	8 March 2021
Gordon Lyons		DUP	8 March 2021	17 June 2021
Gary Middleton		DUP	17 June 2021	5 May 2022
Office suspended				
Aisling Reilly		Sinn Féin	3 February 2024	Incumbent

=== Nominated by the Deputy First Minister ===
Minister	Image	Party	Took office	Left office
Denis Haughey		SDLP	2 December 1999	11 February 2000
Office suspended				
Denis Haughey		SDLP	30 May 2000	14 October 2002
Office suspended				
Gerry Kelly		Sinn Féin	8 May 2007	16 May 2011
Martina Anderson		Sinn Féin	16 May 2011	12 June 2012
Jennifer McCann		Sinn Féin	12 June 2012	25 May 2016
Megan Fearon		Sinn Féin	25 May 2016	9 January 2017
Office suspended				
Declan Kearney		Sinn Féin	11 January 2020	5 May 2022
Office suspended				
Pam Cameron		DUP	3 February 2024	15 September 2025
Joanne Bunting		DUP	15 September 2025	Incumbent

== Assembly Private Secretary ==
Following the 2011 Northern Ireland Assembly election, First Minister Peter Robinson and deputy First Minister Martin McGuinness announced the creation of the new post of Assembly Private Secretary, available to all ministers in the Northern Ireland Executive.

The position is similar to that of a parliamentary private secretary in the House of Commons, providing political support to the Minister within the department. It is non-salaried and held by a backbencher from the same party as the Minister. While not ministerial, and therefore below the rank of junior Minister, it provides experience to members considered as potential future ministers. It is not compulsory to appoint an Assembly Private Secretary; indeed the Alliance Party of Northern Ireland initially did not make appointments.

As of May 2011, OFMDFM officials were drawing up a code of conduct and enabling processes to facilitate the creation of the posts. None had been published by October 2011, meaning that the posts had not been created by the Northern Ireland Assembly up to that point. However, they were declared as public offices in the register of members' interests on 29 June 2011 and 7 October 2011.

== See also ==
- Executive Office (Northern Ireland)
- First Minister and deputy First Minister of Northern Ireland
- List of government ministers in Northern Ireland
