= Cathal Boylan =

Sinn Féin politician (born 1964)

Cathal Boylan MLA
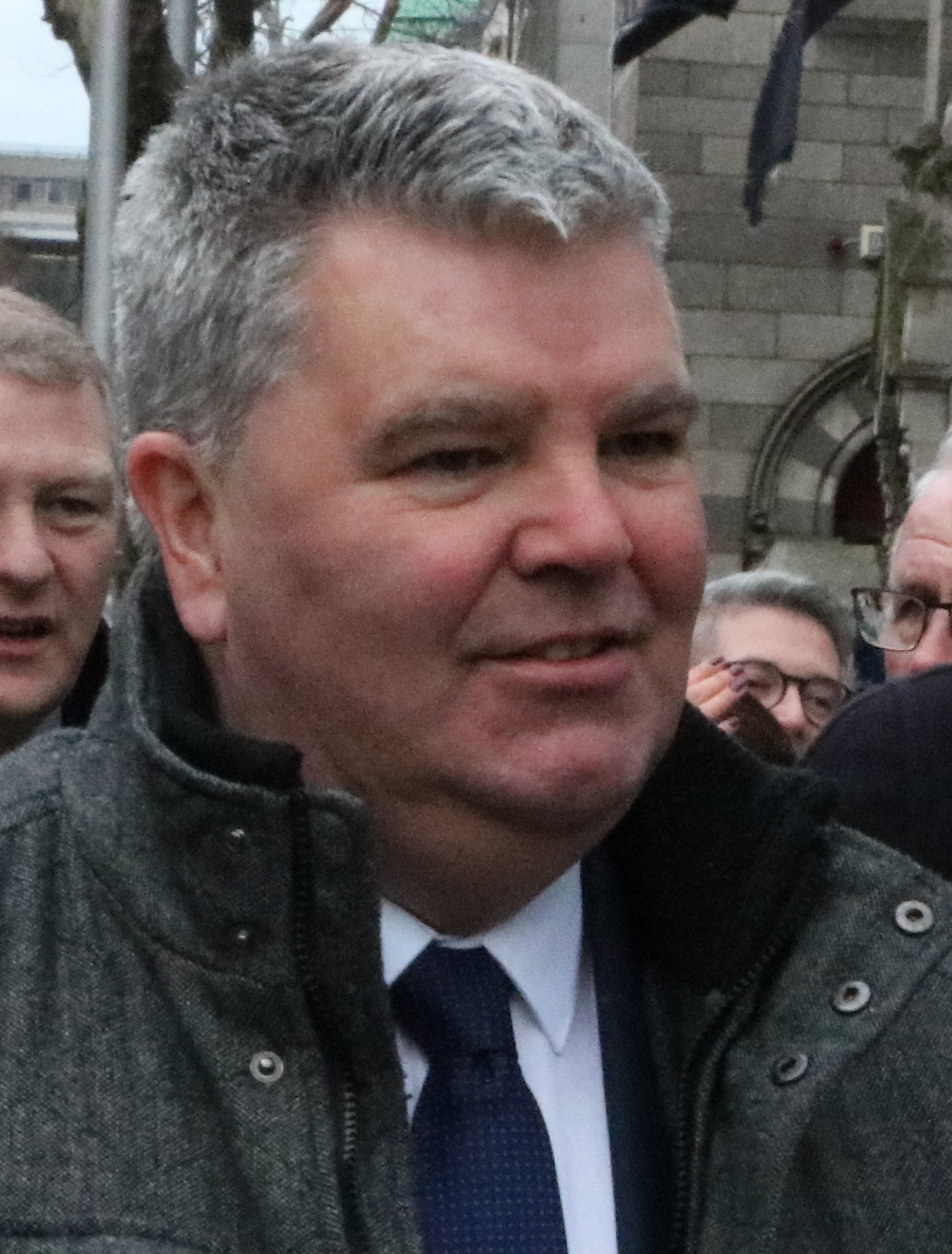
- Boylan in 2018

Member of the Northern Ireland Assembly for Newry and Armagh
- Incumbent
- Assumed office 7 March 2007
- Preceded by: Pat O'Rawe

Leader of Sinn Féin on Armagh City and District Council
- In office 2005–2011
- Leader: Gerry Adams

Member of Armagh City and District Council
- In office 5 May 2005 – 5 May 2011
- Preceded by: Brian Cunningham
- Succeeded by: Mary Doyle
- Constituency: Crossmore

Personal details
- Born: 30 April 1964 (age 62) Keady, Northern Ireland
- Party: Sinn Féin
- Website: Cathal Boylan MLA

Cathal Boylan (Irish name: Cathal Ó Baoighealláin, born 30 April 1964) is an Irish Sinn Féin politician, serving as a Member of the Legislative Assembly (MLA) for Newry and Armagh since 2007.

== Background ==
He is a former Sinn Féin Party Group Leader for Armagh Council and is a member of the Internal Scrutiny Committee, Public Services Scrutiny Committee, The Public Parks Scrutiny Committee and the Market Place Theatre Management Board. He is also Vice - chairperson of both the East Border Region Partnership and the Local Strategy Partnership (LSP).

He is a lifelong resident of Keady. He sits on the recently formed Keady Regeneration Committee, and for many years his membership of Keady Residents Association has involved his participation in discussions with the Parades Commission. The married man is the chairperson of the local Mc Verry/McElvanna Sinn Féin Cumann, of which he was a founder member.

He was Chairperson of the Northern Ireland Assembly Environment committee between 2007 and 2011.

Northern Ireland Assembly
Preceded by Pat O'Rawe	MLA for Newry and Armagh; 2007–present	Incumbent
