= Ciara Ferguson =

Politician from Northern Ireland

Ciara Ferguson MLA
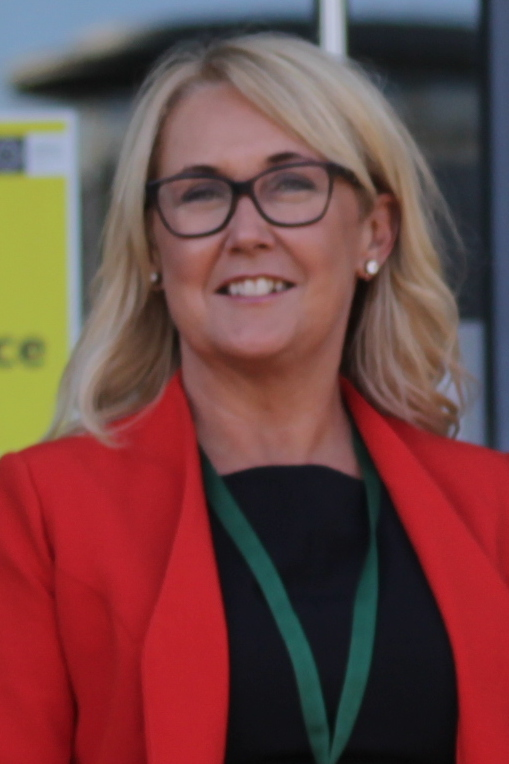
- Ferguson in 2021

Member of the Northern Ireland Assembly for Foyle
- Incumbent
- Assumed office 13 September 2021
- Preceded by: Martina Anderson

Personal details
- Born: 21 September 1971 (age 54) Strabane, Northern Ireland
- Party: Sinn Féin
- Spouse: Eamon Ferguson
- Children: Eamon Ferguson, Erin Ferguson, Patrick Ferguson
- Occupation: Community development worker

Ciara Ferguson MLA (born 21 September 1971) is an Irish Sinn Féin politician, serving as a Member of the Legislative Assembly (MLA) for Foyle since 2021.

== Background ==
She attended Holy Cross College, Strabane. Prior to her election, Ferguson was a community development worker, based in Strabane.

Ferguson became the MLA for Foyle following a selection convention held by Sinn Féin after her predecessor Martina Anderson was forced to step down following an internal review by the party.
