= Emma Little-Pengelly =

Deputy First Minister of Northern Ireland since 2024

Emma Little-Pengelly MLA
- Little-Pengelly in 2026

Deputy First Minister of Northern Ireland
- Incumbent
- Assumed office 3 February 2024 Serving with Michelle O'Neill
- Preceded by: Michelle O'Neill

Member of the Legislative Assembly for Lagan Valley
- Incumbent
- Assumed office 12 May 2022
- Preceded by: Paul Rankin

Member of Parliament for Belfast South
- In office 8 June 2017 – 6 November 2019
- Preceded by: Alasdair McDonnell
- Succeeded by: Claire Hanna

Junior Minister Assisting the First Minister
- In office 28 October 2015 – 25 May 2016 Serving with Jennifer McCann
- First Minister: Peter Robinson
- Preceded by: Michelle McIlveen
- Succeeded by: Alastair Ross

Member of the Legislative Assembly for Belfast South
- In office 28 September 2015 – 25 January 2017
- Preceded by: Jimmy Spratt
- Succeeded by: Seat abolished

Personal details
- Born: Mary Emma Jean Little; 31 December 1979 (age 46) Markethill, County Armagh, Northern Ireland
- Party: Democratic Unionist Party
- Spouse: Richard Pengelly (m. 2014)
- Children: 3 stepchildren
- Education: Queen's University Belfast
- Profession: Barrister

Emma Little-Pengelly (née Little; born 31 December 1979) is a Northern Irish barrister and Democratic Unionist Party (DUP) politician serving as Deputy First Minister of Northern Ireland since February 2024. She has been a Member of the Legislative Assembly (MLA) for Lagan Valley since May 2022, when she was co-opted (appointed) to replace then-DUP party leader Jeffrey Donaldson, who declined to take up his seat following the 2022 election.

She previously served as the Member of Parliament (MP) for the Belfast South constituency in the House of Commons of the United Kingdom from 2017 until 2019, when she lost her seat to Claire Hanna of the SDLP, and as an MLA for the Belfast South constituency in the Northern Ireland Assembly.

== Early life ==
Little-Pengelly is the daughter of Maureen Elizabeth Little and Noel Little (also known as John Little). Her father was a leader of the loyalist paramilitary group Ulster Resistance and a former Ulster Defence Regiment (UDR) soldier. He was absent from her childhood for two years, following his arrest in Paris in April 1989. Along with two other paramilitaries, Little was convicted of terrorism-related conspiracy, for trying to trade stolen British missile plans to the South African government in return for weapons. He was fined and sentenced to time served. Noel Little was also alleged to have been involved in the smuggling of weapons to loyalists in 1987.

Little-Pengelly was educated at Markethill High School, Portadown College and Queen's University Belfast. She qualified as a barrister in 2003.

== Political career ==
Little-Pengelly began her political career in 2007 as Special Advisor to Ian Paisley, while he was in the office of First Minister, where she worked as part of the DUP talks team with victims of the Troubles. Little-Pengelly remained in the position of Special Advisor when Peter Robinson assumed the office of First Minister in 2008 until 2015 after over eight years in the position.

In 2015, Little-Pengelly was chosen by the DUP to replace Jimmy Spratt as MLA for Belfast South in the Northern Ireland Assembly, following his retirement due to ill health. On 28 October 2015, Little-Pengelly was appointed as a junior minister in the Northern Ireland Executive Office. Little-Pengelly ran in the 2016 Assembly Election in the South Belfast constituency and was elected. She lost her seat at the 2017 Northern Ireland Assembly election, as the total number of seats in Belfast South was reduced from 6 to 5, trailing her running mate Christopher Stalford by 15 votes at the time of her elimination.

At the 2017 UK general election, Little-Pengelly was elected MP for Belfast South, gaining the seat from the SDLP's Alasdair McDonnell. The former Northern Ireland First Minister Peter Robinson was the chief strategist behind Little-Pengelly's campaign. She later lost the seat to the SDLP's Claire Hanna at the 2019 general election.

On 12 May 2022, one week after the Northern Ireland Assembly election, DUP leader Jeffrey Donaldson refused to take his seat in Stormont due to his opposition to the Northern Ireland Protocol. Little-Pengelly was appointed by the DUP to replace him. She said "I have agreed to fill [Donaldson's] seat in Lagan Valley at this time both to support this work and to ensure a continued high level of support and service to the constituents of Lagan Valley. It is a privilege to be asked to fulfil this role at this important time for unionism and for Northern Ireland. While Sir Jeffrey focuses on that immediate task, I look forward to serving the people of Lagan Valley with passion and commitment."

=== Deputy First Minister of Northern Ireland ===
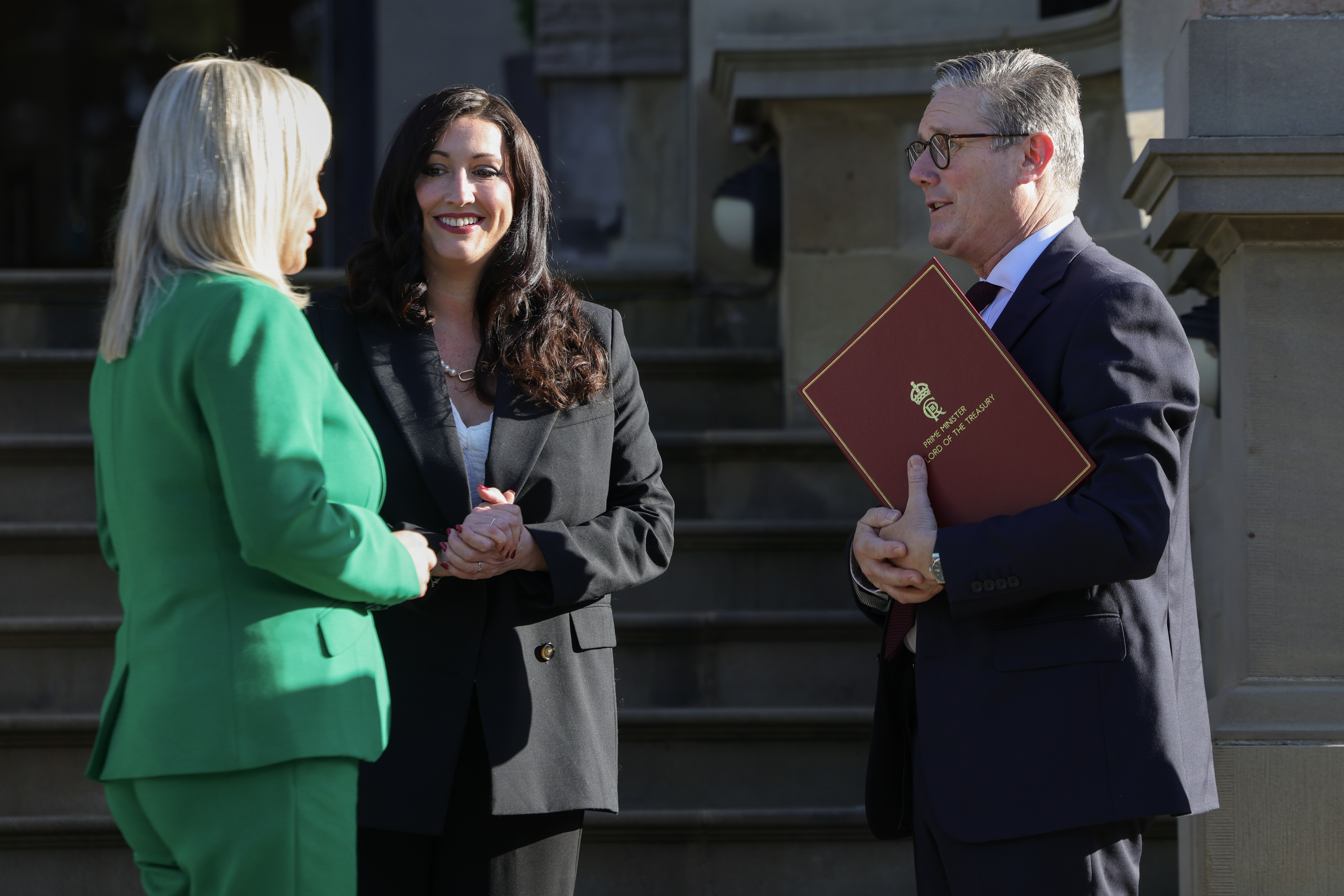
Little-Pengelly and Michelle O'Neill with Keir Starmer in July 2024

On 3 February 2024, Little-Pengelly became Deputy First Minister of Northern Ireland following the reestablishment of the Northern Ireland Executive. Her appointment marked the first time a unionist occupied the office of Deputy First Minister.

In July 2025, she faced controversy when she and her husband undertook a publicly-funded trip to Wimbledon; almost £1000 covered the flights and accommodation, in addition to the free seats they received in the Royal Box. She went on the trip even though it clashed with a rearranged appearance before the Committee for the Executive Office.

== Personal life ==
Little-Pengelly is married to Richard Pengelly CB who, as of 2026, is the Chief Executive of the Education Authority in Northern Ireland.

Northern Ireland Assembly
Preceded by Jimmy Spratt	MLA for Belfast South; 2015–2017	Seat abolished
Preceded by Paul Rankin	MLA for Lagan Valley; 2022–present	Incumbent
Parliament of the United Kingdom
Preceded by Alasdair McDonnell	Member of Parliament for Belfast South; 2017–2019	Succeeded by Claire Hanna
Political offices
Preceded by Michelle McIlveen	Junior Minister; 2015–2016	Succeeded by Alastair Ross
Vacant Title last held by Michelle O'Neill	Deputy First Minister; 2024–present	Incumbent
