= Áine Murphy =

Northern Irish politician

Áine Murphy MLA
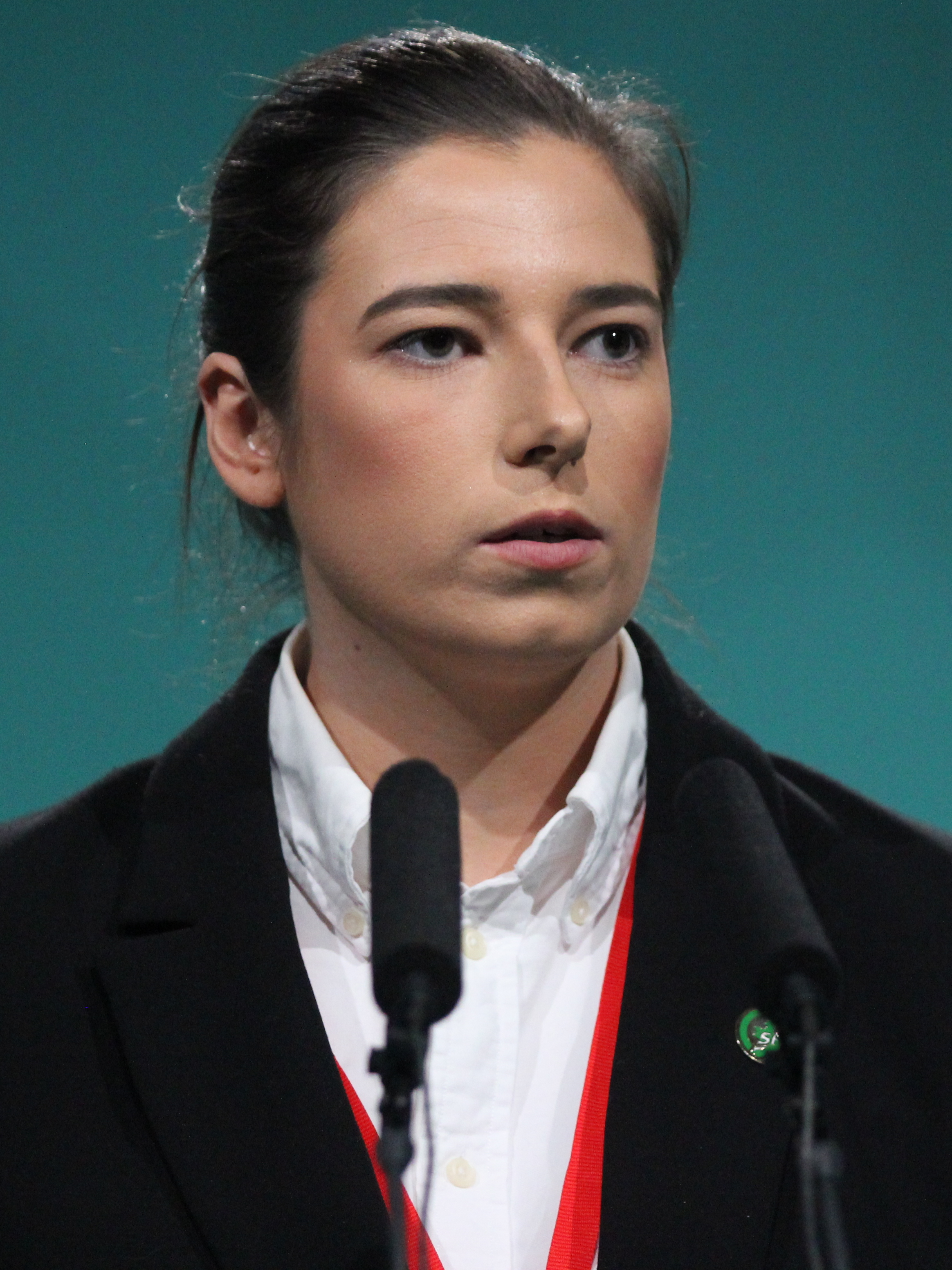
- Murphy in 2023

Member of the Northern Ireland Assembly for Fermanagh and South Tyrone
- Incumbent
- Assumed office 5 July 2021
- Preceded by: Seán Lynch

Personal details
- Party: Sinn Féin
- Website: Áine Murphy MLA

Áine Murphy MLA is a Sinn Féin politician who has been a Member of the Legislative Assembly (MLA) for Fermanagh and South Tyrone since 2021.

== Political career ==
Murphy was co-opted to the Northern Ireland Assembly in July 2021 for Fermanagh and South Tyrone, succeeding Sean Lynch, who had retired. After taking office, she stated her biggest focuses were improving health care in Lisnaskea and the Ulster Canal project.

In March 2022, she introduced a fracking prohibition bill.

At the 2022 Assembly election, Murphy was re-elected to the Assembly on the eighth and final count with 7,379 first-preference votes (13.73%).
