= Pam Cameron =

Junior Minister at the Northern Ireland Executive Office since 2024

Pam Cameron MLA
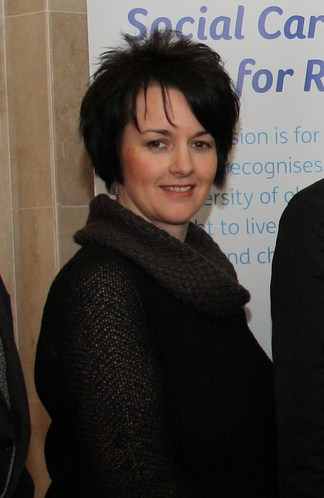

Junior Minister Assisting the Deputy First Minister
- In office 3 February 2024 – 16 September 2025 Serving with Aisling Reilly
- Preceded by: Declan Kearney (2022)
- Succeeded by: Joanne Bunting

Member of the Legislative Assembly for South Antrim
- Incumbent
- Assumed office 5 May 2011
- Preceded by: Thomas Burns

Mayor of Antrim
- In office 2010–2011

Member of Antrim Borough Council
- In office 5 May 2005 – 22 May 2014
- Preceded by: Paul Michael
- Succeeded by: Council abolished
- Constituency: Antrim Town

Personal details
- Born: Pamela Brown; 30 December 1971 (age 54)
- Party: Democratic Unionist
- Spouse(s): Ian Lewis (divorced); Michael Cameron
- Children: 3

Pamela (Pam) Cameron MLA (born 30 December 1971; formerly Lewis, née Pamela Brown) is a Unionist politician from Northern Ireland, who served as a Junior Minister in the Executive of the 7th Northern Ireland Assembly from February 2024 to September 2025. She is a member of the Democratic Unionist Party (DUP).

== Political career ==
Cameron has sat in the Northern Ireland Assembly since 2011 as the Member of the Legislative Assembly (MLA) for the South Antrim constituency. She is the DUP Spokesperson for Equality, Disability and Participation.

Cameron was elected to Antrim Borough Council in 2005 and was elected as the Council's first woman Mayor in 2010. Prior to her election to the Assembly, Cameron was the constituency office manager for the politician Sammy Wilson. Speaking about her election success, Cameron said: "I thought I would do well but I did not think I would get to this stage. I know there are Roman Catholics who voted for me and that I have cross-community support. I hope that continues."

Cameron became junior minister in the 2024 Northern Ireland Executive formation.

== Personal life ==
Pam is married to Michael Cameron, a Northern Ireland civil servant. The relationship was the subject of a Press Complaints Commission complaint, which resulted in the publication of a correction and apology.

Northern Ireland Assembly
Preceded by Thomas Burns	MLA for South Antrim; 2011–present	Incumbent
