= Joanne Bunting =

Politician from Northern Ireland

Joanne Bunting MLA
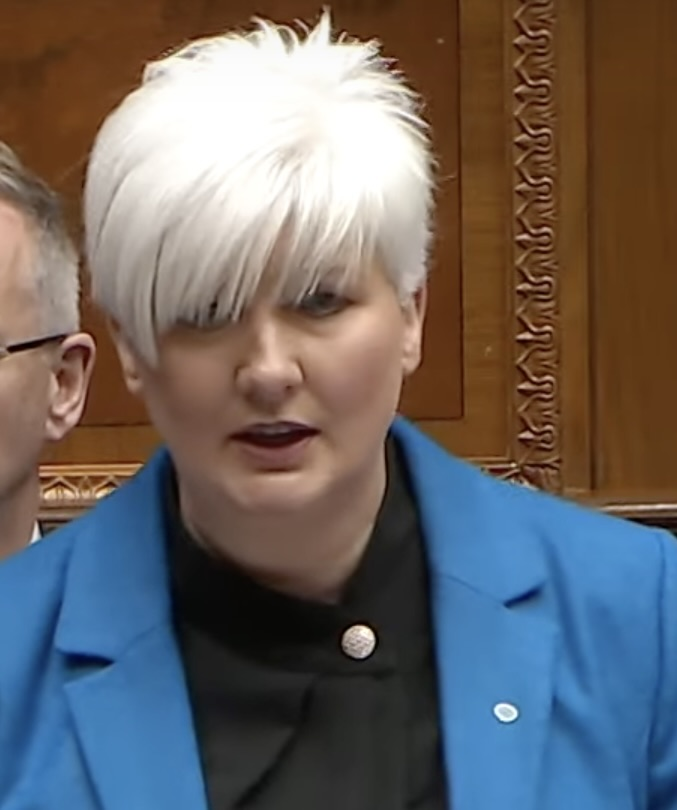
- Bunting in 2024

Junior Minister Assisting the Deputy First Minister
- Incumbent
- Assumed office 16 September 2025 Serving with Aisling Reilly
- Preceded by: Pam Cameron

Chair of the Committee for Justice
- In office 6 February 2024 – 16 September 2025
- Preceded by: Mervyn Storey (2022)
- Succeeded by: Peter Martin

Member of the Legislative Assembly for Belfast East
- Incumbent
- Assumed office 5 May 2016
- Preceded by: Peter Robinson

Mayor of Castlereagh
- In office 2004–2005
- Preceded by: Billy Bell
- Succeeded by: Jonathan Craig

Member of Castlereagh Borough Council
- In office 2000 – 5 May 2011
- Preceded by: John Dunn
- Succeeded by: Denny Vitty
- Constituency: Castlereagh Central

Personal details
- Born: June 7, 1974 (age 52) Belfast, Northern Ireland
- Party: Democratic Unionist Party

Joanne Bunting (born 7 June 1974) is a Democratic Unionist Party (DUP) politician, who has served as a Junior Minister in the Executive of the 7th Northern Ireland Assembly since 2025. She has been a Member of the Northern Ireland Assembly (MLA) for Belfast East since 2016. Bunting is the DUP's Spokesperson for Justice and was Chair of the Northern Ireland Assembly Committee for Justice from February 2024 to September 2025.

== Career ==
Bunting was educated at Braniel Primary School and Grosvenor High School. As an elected representative, she served as a Councillor in Castlereagh for 11 years, from 2000 to 2011, and as Mayor in 2004/05.

For 18 years she worked at the Northern Ireland Assembly. In 2016, Bunting was elected on the first count to the Northern Ireland Assembly, as one of three DUP MLAs.

In August 2020, Bunting was charged with four driving offences, including careless driving and leaving the scene of an accident but the charges were dropped in April 2021 when she accepted a Police caution.

Bunting is a member of the Northern Ireland Policing Board, and serves the Assembly All Party Groups on Active Travel, Harm Related to Gambling, Access to Justice, Terminal Illness, Animal Welfare and Carers.

Northern Ireland Assembly
| Preceded by Peter Robinson | MLA for East Belfast; 2016–present | Incumbent |
