= Aisling Reilly =

Junior Minister at the Northern Ireland Executive Office since 2024

Aisling Reilly MLA
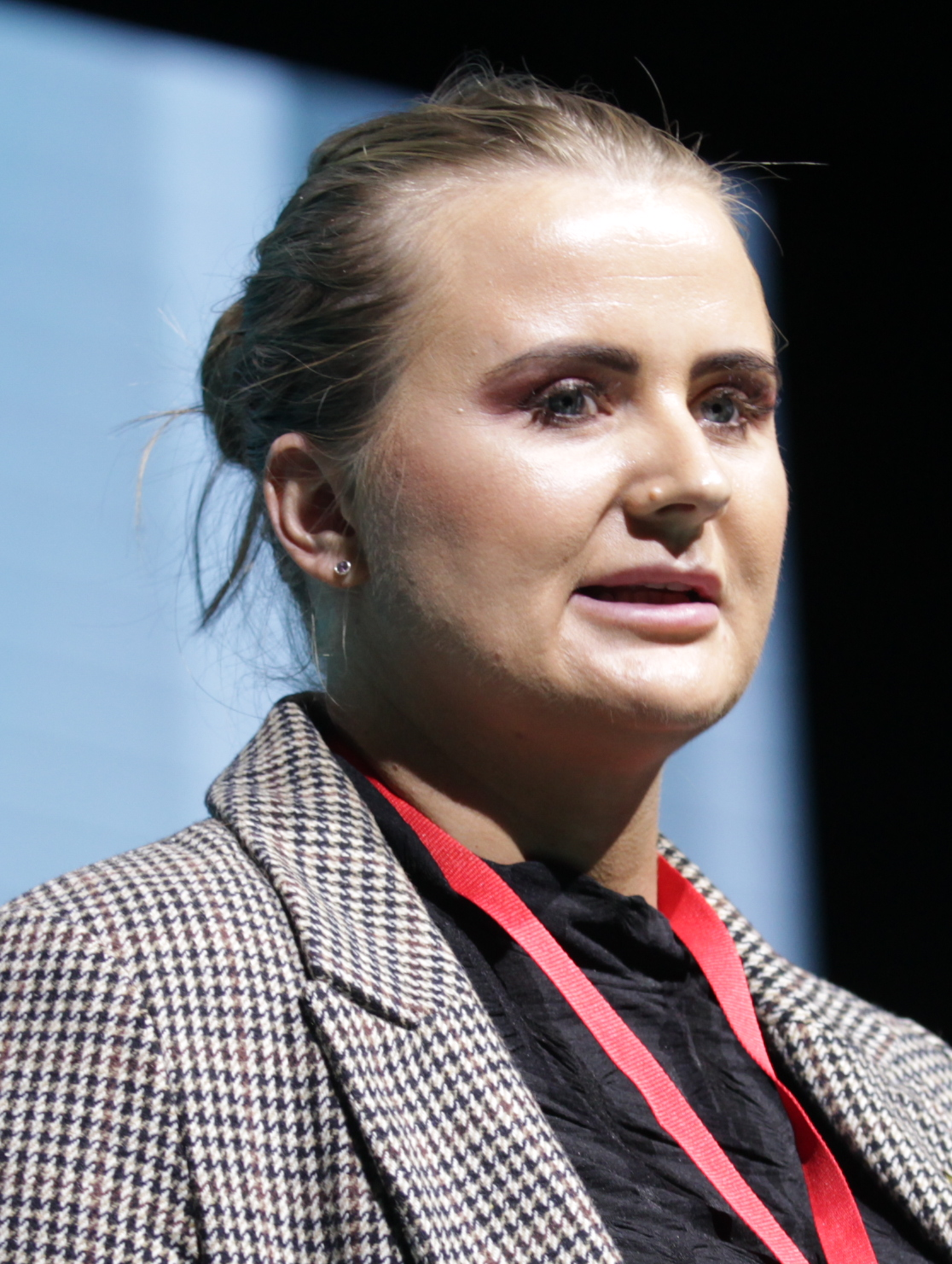

Junior Minister Assisting the First Minister
- Incumbent
- Assumed office 3 February 2024 Serving with Pam Cameron (2024–2025), Joanne Bunting (since 2025)
- First Minister: Michelle O'Neill
- Preceded by: Gary Middleton (2022)

Member of the Northern Ireland Assembly for West Belfast
- Incumbent
- Assumed office 19 October 2021
- Preceded by: Fra McCann

Personal details
- Party: Sinn Féin
- Website: Aisling Reilly MLA

Aisling Reilly (Irish: Aisling Ní Raghallaigh) is an Irish Sinn Féin politician, who has served as a Junior Minister in the Executive of the 7th Northern Ireland Assembly since 2024. She has served as a Member of the Northern Ireland Assembly (MLA) for Belfast West since 2021.

== Career ==
Reilly was educated in Coláiste Feirste and speaks fluent Irish.

Reilly was co-opted to the Northern Ireland Assembly in October 2021, replacing veteran MLA Fra McCann, as a Member for Belfast West.

She was re-elected to the Assembly at the 2022 election.

On 13 May 2022, Reilly became the first member of the Northern Ireland Assembly to give a full speech in the Irish language.
