= 2014 North Down and Ards District Council election =

2014 Northern Irish local government election

2014 North Down and Ards Council election
← 2011, Ards; 2011, North Down	22 May 2014	2019 →

All 40 council seats 21 seats needed for a majority
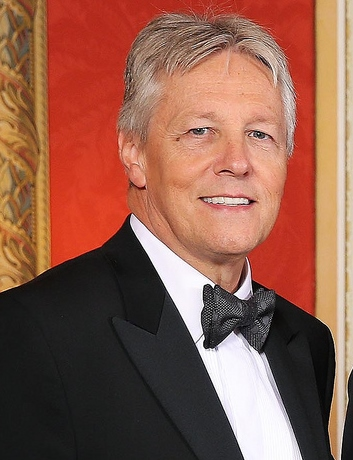

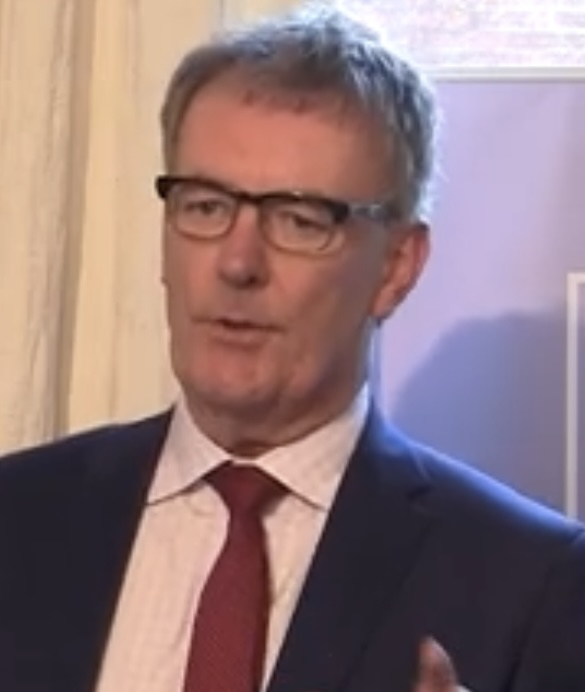

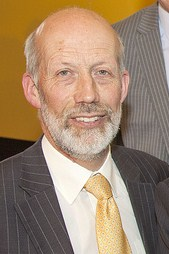

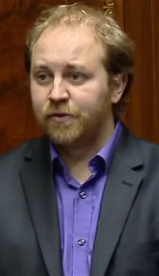

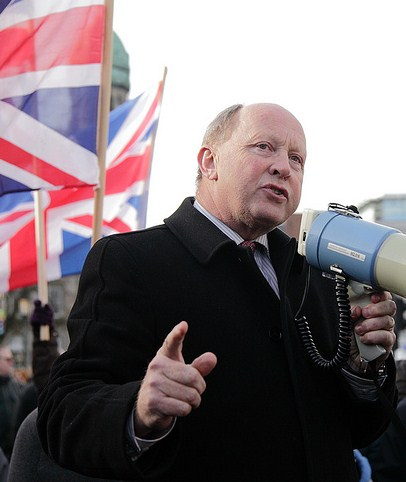

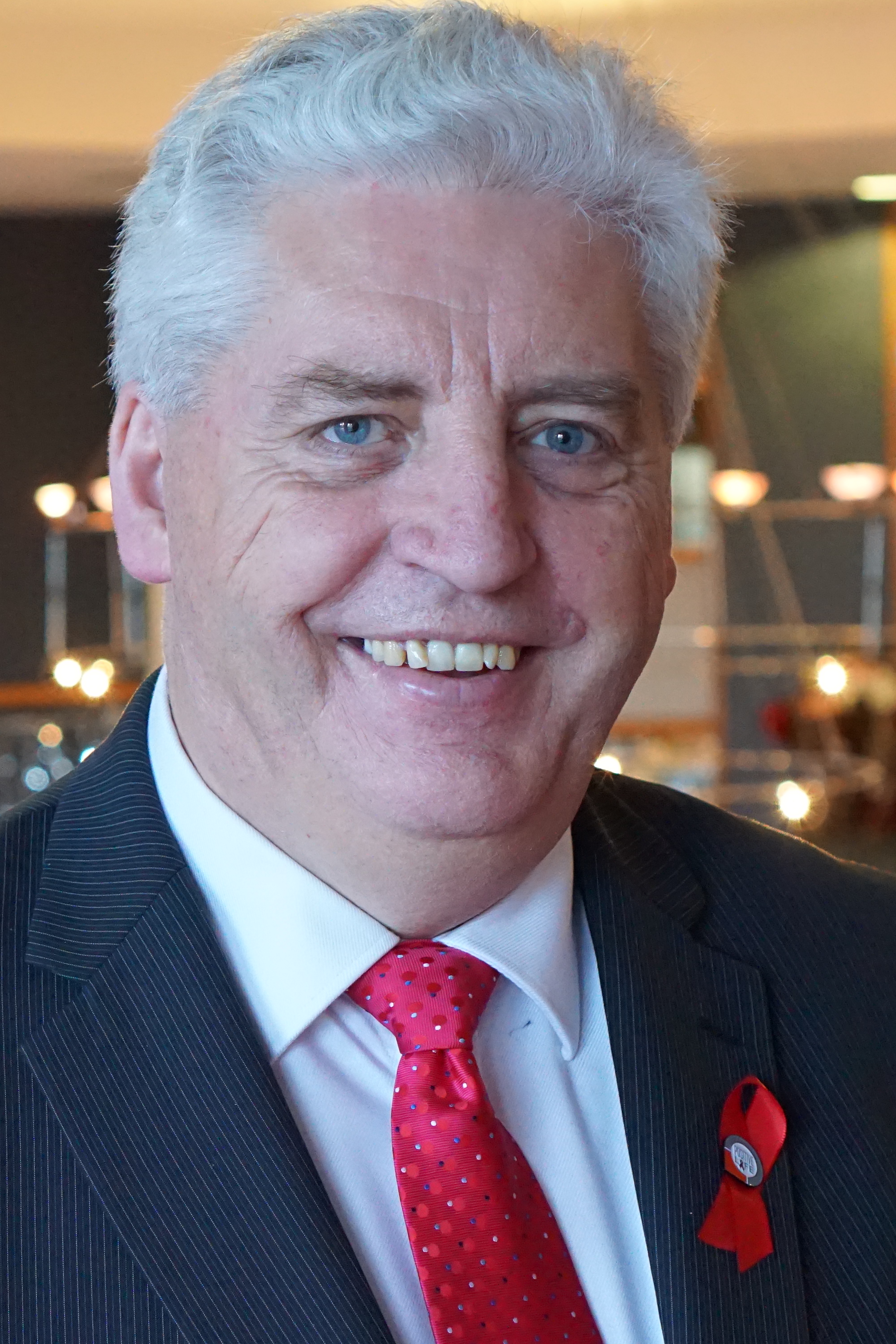
	First party	Second party	Third party
Leader	Peter Robinson	Mike Nesbitt	David Ford
Party	DUP	UUP	Alliance
Seats won	17	9	7
Seat change	▼5	▼1	▼5
	Fourth party	Fifth party	Sixth party
Leader	Steven Agnew	Jim Allister	Alasdair McDonnell
Party	Green (NI)	TUV	SDLP
Seats won	3	1	1
Seat change	▲2	▲1	▼2
	Seventh party
Party	Independent
Seats won	2
Seat change	New council
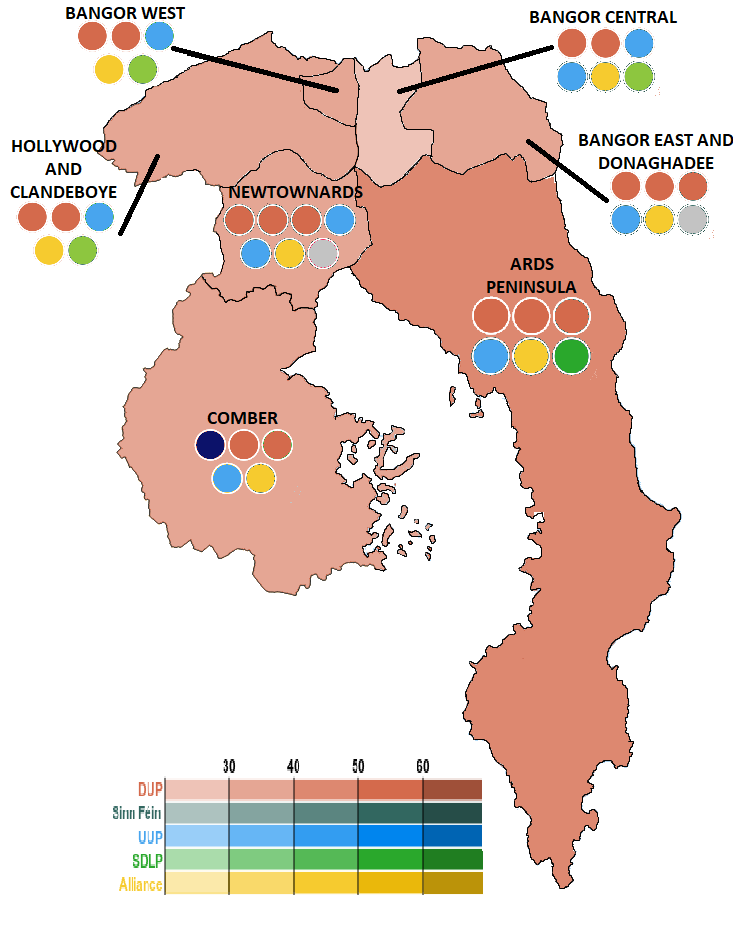
- Ards and North Down 2014 Council Election Results by DEA (Shaded by plurality of FPVs)

The first election to North Down and Ards District Council (now Ards and North Down Borough Council), part of the Northern Ireland local elections on 22 May 2014, returned 40 members to the newly formed council via Single Transferable Vote. The Democratic Unionist Party won a plurality of first-preference votes and seats.

== Election results ==
Party	Seats	First Pref. votes	FPv%
DUP	17	16,460	35.93
UUP	9	8,092	17.66
Alliance	7	6,243	13.63
Green (NI)	3	2,023	4.42
Independent	2	4,505	9.83
TUV	1	2,252	4.92
SDLP	1	1,695	3.70
NI Conservatives	0	1,554	3.77
NI21	0	1,441	3.49
UKIP	0	1,180	2.86
Sinn Féin	0	388	0.94
Community Partnership	0	388	0.94
Totals	40	41,270	100.00

== Districts summary ==
Results of the North Down and Ards Borough Council election, 2014 by district
Ward	%	Cllrs	%	Cllrs	%	Cllrs	%	Cllrs	%	Cllrs	%	Cllrs	%	Cllrs	Total Cllrs
Ward	DUP		UUP		Alliance		Green		TUV		SDLP		Others		Total Cllrs
Ards Peninsula	47.1	3	16.6	1	8.1	1	0.0	0	0.0	0	19.1	1	9.1	0	6
Bangor Central	28.0	2	15.7	2	12.8	1	7.6	1	4.6	0	0.0	0	31.3	0	6
Bangor East and Donaghadee	32.4	3	18.9	1	9.8	1	3.9	0	5.3	0	0.0	0	29.7	1	6
Bangor West	31.9	2	16.2	1	17.3	1	6.4	1	9.1	0	4.9	0	14.2	0	5
Comber	39.2	2	22.1	1	13.2	1	0.0	0	9.3	1	0.0	0	16.2	0	5
Holywood and Clandeboye	31.9	2	17.8	1	22.2	1	14.9	1	0.0	0	5.0	0	8.2	0	5
Newtownards	35.7	3	15.2	2	12.7	1	0.0	0	6.4	0	0.0	0	30.0	1	7
Total	35.4	17	17.4	9	13.4	7	4.4	3	4.8	1	4.2	1	20.4	2	40

== District results ==
=== Ards Peninsula ===
2014: 3 x DUP, 1 x SDLP, 1 x UUP, 1 x Alliance

Ards Peninsula - 6 seats
Party	Candidate	FPv%	Count							
Party	Candidate	FPv%	1	2	3	4	5	6	7	8
DUP	Robert Adair*	24.48%	1,773							
SDLP	Joe Boyle*	19.15%	1,387							
UUP	Angus Carson*	16.55%	1,199							
DUP	Nigel Edmund	8.57%	621	1,159.79						
Alliance	Kellie Armstrong* †	6.06%	439	457.49	605.69	619.46	620.56	650.47	862	1,074
DUP	Eddie Thompson*	7.25%	456	535.12	539.02	604.98	697.88	712.11	788.67	800
DUP	Louise Wallace	7.72%	559	616.19	618.29	653.99	669.89	678.18	701.41	703.31
Sinn Féin	Sheila Bailie	5.36%	388	390.58	535.48	535.82	535.92	538.82	557.69	
NI Conservatives	Paul Leeman	2.22%	161	180.35	185.75	215.67	220.17	246.71		
Alliance	Colin McCormick	2.02%	146	150.73	190.33	200.02	200.72	220.09		
NI21	John Bustard	1.57%	114	117.87	125.07	131.7	132.1			
Electorate: 16,656 Valid: 7,243 (43.49%) Spoilt: 126 Quota: 1,035 Turnout: 7,369 (44.24%)

=== Bangor Central ===
2014: 2 x DUP, 2 x UUP, 1 x Alliance, 1 x Green

Bangor Central - 6 seats
Party	Candidate	FPv%	Count												
Party	Candidate	FPv%	1	2	3	4	5	6	7	8	9	10	11	12	13
DUP	Wesley Irvine*	9.81%	643	650	651	746	776	791	837	841	878	956			
Alliance	Stuart Anderson †	6.76%	443	454	478	482	485	509	510	831	875	892	892	990	
Green (NI)	Noelle Robinson ‡	7.57%	496	513	556	559	569	594	599	648	694	743	743.26	957.26	
UUP	Ian Henry*	8.98%	589	603	611	619	635	657	741	747	848	932	934.08	956.08	
UUP	Carl McClean	6.74%	442	470	477	487	500	517	545	551	607	692	693.56	789.56	809.56
DUP	Alistair Cathcart*	8.45%	554	556	560	584	589	606	642	643	664	721	725.16	754.16	757.16
DUP	Roberta Dunlop*	6.62%	434	440	443	477	495	515	543	548	612	656	665.36	705.36	710.36
Independent	Mary Macartney	6.79%	445	455	465	470	486	512	515	537	619	664	665.04		
UKIP	William Montgomery*	5.87%	385	400	408	412	434	450	561	565	591				
Independent	David Chambers	5.90%	387	406	411	420	429	501	508	525					
Alliance	Nicholas Fell	6.03%	395	399	433	435	436	449	451						
TUV	William Cudworth	4.58%	300	304	305	308	360	369							
Independent	Colin Breen	4.18%	274	281	293	295	301								
Community Partnership	Mark Gordon	3.39%	222	224	229	230									
DUP	Adam Harbinson*	3.10%	203	209	212										
NI21	Peter Floyd	2.65%	174	178											
NI Conservatives	David Symington	2.59%	170												
Electorate: 17,194 Valid: 6,556 (38.13%) Spoilt: 122 Quota: 937 Turnout: 6,678 (38.84%)

=== Bangor East and Donaghadee ===
2014: 3 x DUP, 1 x UUP, 1 x Alliance, 1 x Independent

Bangor East and Donaghadee - 6 seats
Party	Candidate	FPv%	Count										
Party	Candidate	FPv%	1	2	3	4	5	6	7	8	9	10	11
Independent	Alan Chambers* ‡†	19.15%	1,311										
UUP	Mark Brooks	15.65%	1,071										
Alliance	Gavin Walker	9.82%	672	724.92	731.58	804.68	839.66	1,001.66					
DUP	Peter Martin*	9.13%	625	662.8	664.6	671.44	685.58	691.51	691.51	726.28	782.4	1,083.4	
DUP	Bill Keery*	8.15%	558	594.68	600.98	607.98	619.31	627.71	627.71	653.88	755.77	905.81	945.33
DUP	Tom Smith*	7.90%	541	556.96	572.17	575.73	590.41	597.51	597.51	640.36	680.13	737.56	801.78
UKIP	Patrick Toms	5.38%	368	383.4	385.65	394.02	411.31	426.29	427.29	566.11	636.84	658.93	660.07
DUP	Terence Malcolm*	7.19%	492	516.08	517.61	522.89	531.26	539	539	563.37	614		
UUP	Christopher Eisenstadt	3.27%	224	285.6	333.3	349.51	390.3	424.77	425.77	507.38			
TUV	Joseph Strutt	5.29%	362	379.92	382.98	387.54	404.54	411.4	411.4				
Green (NI)	Trana Gray	3.87%	265	288.52	291.4	330.08	347.59						
NI Conservatives	Brian McBride	2.56%	175	204.96	208.83	218.39							
NI21	William McKee	2.64%	181	192.48	192.93								
Electorate: 16,956 Valid: 6,845 (40.37%) Spoilt: 70 Quota: 978 Turnout: 6,915 (40.78%)

=== Bangor West ===
2014: 2 x DUP, 1 x Alliance, 1 x UUP, 1 x Green

Bangor West - 5 seats
Party	Candidate	FPv%	Count									
Party	Candidate	FPv%	1	2	3	4	5	6	7	8	9	10
UUP	Marion Smith*	16.15%	870	887	890	950						
DUP	Alan Graham*	16.08%	866	889	891	932						
DUP	Alan Leslie* †	15.80%	851	881	883	895	912					
Alliance	Scott Wilson	11.49%	619	622	686	701	709	713	713	807	1,102	
Green (NI)	Paul Roberts †††	6.42%	346	359	426	449	453	456	456	562	664	830
TUV	Robert Gordon	9.12%	491	520	521	568	573	580	586	634	646	657
Alliance	Laurence Thompson*	5.85%	315	319	403	422	425	425	425	506		
NI21	Steven Denny	6.37%	344	354	382	412	415	419	420			
NI Conservatives	Mark Brotherston	4.72%	254	272	277							
SDLP	Ingrid Logan	4.91%	264	268								
Community Partnership	Alison Blayney	3.08%	166									
Electorate: 13,479 Valid: 5,386 (39.96%) Spoilt: 62 Quota: 898 Turnout: 5,448 (40.42%)

=== Comber ===
2014: 2 x DUP, 1 x UUP, 1 x Alliance, 1 x TUV

Comber - 5 seats
Party	Candidate	FPv%	Count						
Party	Candidate	FPv%	1	2	3	4	5	6	7
DUP	Robert Gibson*	17.29%	1,071						
UUP	James Fletcher*	13.93%	863	878	880.61	974.67	1,037.67		
Alliance	Deborah Girvan*	13.16%	815	880	880.3	980.39	1,016.48	1,121.48	
DUP	Trevor Cummings*	11.54%	715	724	733.39	771.63	838.93	960.93	975.93
TUV	Stephen Cooper	9.32%	577	585	585.78	639.87	750.08	908.23	920.23
DUP	John Oswald*	10.33%	640	648	663.36	676.63	742.14	867.38	879.38
UUP	Philip Smith*	8.17%	506	526	526.42	588.48	661.6		
UKIP	Isabella Hanna	6.89%	427	439	440.65	477.71			
NI Conservatives	John Andrews	6.64%	411	425	425.93				
NI21	Margaret Howson	2.73%	169						
Electorate: 13,681 Valid: 6,194 (45.27%) Spoilt: 78 Quota: 1,033 Turnout: 6,272 (45.84%)

=== Holywood and Clandeboye ===
2014: 2 x DUP, 1 x Alliance, 1 x UUP, 1 x Green

Holywood and Clandeboye - 5 seats
Party	Candidate	FPv%	Count						
Party	Candidate	FPv%	1	2	3	4	5	6	7
DUP	Stephen Dunne*	23.12%	1,423						
Alliance	Andrew Muir*	14.79%	910	922.88	983.16	1,013.44	1,154.44		
Green (NI)	John Barry* †	14.88%	916	933.92	988.76	1,024.04	1,098.04		
UUP	Daniel Allen ‡‡	10.06%	619	647.28	672.56	728.12	735.12	735.12	1,098.12
DUP	Jennifer Gilmour* †	8.77%	540	837.64	855.92	882.60	886.16	886.16	954.96
Alliance	Kate Nicholl	7.41%	456	460.48	485.04	518.32	586.16	710.16	759.4
UUP	James McKerrow*	7.72%	475	491.52	508.80	558.80	562.64	564.64	
SDLP	Peter Lismore	5.00%	308	311.36	319.64	326.64			
NI Conservatives	William O'Callaghan	4.31%	265	268.08	280.08				
NI21	Matthew Johnston	3.38%	208	210.8					
Independent	Gerard Leddy	0.55%	34	34.28					
Electorate: 14,158 Valid: 6,154 (43.47%) Spoilt: 75 Quota: 1,026 Turnout: 6,229 (44.00%)

=== Newtownards ===
2014: 3 x DUP, 2 x UUP, 1 x Alliance, 1 x Independent

Newtownards - 7 seats
Party	Candidate	FPv%	Count								
Party	Candidate	FPv%	1	2	3	4	5	6	7	8	9
Independent	James Menagh*	18.06%	1,464								
DUP	Naomi Armstrong*	12.94%	1,049								
DUP	Stephen McIlveen*	10.23%	829	900.4	907.75	910.3	931.46	946.89	1,016.34		
DUP	Colin Kennedy*	6.82%	553	585.2	591.2	593.6	607.35	618.73	665.55	1,030.55	
Alliance	Alan McDowell*	6.64%	538	554.8	567.15	567.42	578.82	631.22	653.02	659.17	1,074.17
UUP	Richard Smart	7.88%	639	683.1	705.8	706.25	725.35	751.1	807.56	836.74	864.79
UUP	Katherine Ferguson	7.34%	595	631.05	659.10	660.24	681.12	714.9	759.1	811.18	855.85
TUV	David McMullen	6.44%	522	559.8	570.5	570.95	586.4	602.48	647.68	679.45	689.53
Alliance	Linda Cleland*	6.11%	495	512.85	515.85	516.51	530.96	588.66	623.36	634.13	
DUP	John Elliott*	5.72%	464	508.45	512.45	534.26	555.77	565.56	611.51		
Independent	Ian Cox	4.74%	384	470.45	471.45	472.11	542.34	559.39			
NI21	Nichola Keenan	3.10%	251	263.25	274.25	274.49	288.19				
Independent	Sharon Hunt	2.54%	206	250.8	253.8	254.01					
NI Conservatives	William McKendry	1.46%	118	121.85							
Electorate: 19,953 Valid: 8,107 (40.63%) Spoilt: 143 Quota: 1,014 Turnout: 8,250 (41.35%)

* Incumbent

== Changes during the term ==
=== † Co-options ===
Co-option date	Electoral Area	Party	Outgoing	Co-optee	Reason
19 May 2016	Bangor East and Donaghadee	UUP	Alan Chambers	David Chambers	A. Chambers was elected to the Northern Ireland Assembly.
1 Jun 2016	Ards Peninsula	Alliance	Kellie Armstrong	Lorna McAlpine	Armstrong was elected to the Northern Ireland Assembly.
7 Jul 2016	Bangor Central	Alliance	Stuart Anderson	Karen Douglas	Anderson resigned.
24 Oct 2016	Bangor West	Green (NI)	Paul Roberts	Rachel Woods	
28 Feb 2018	Bangor West	DUP	Alan Leslie	Jennifer Gilmour	
15 Mar 2018	Bangor West	Green (NI)	Rachel Woods	James Hunter	Woods moved to the Holywood and Clandeboye DEA.
15 Mar 2018	Holywood and Clandeboye	Green (NI)	Prof. John Barry	Rachel Woods	Barry resigned.
27 Mar 2018	Holywood and Clandeboye	DUP	Jennifer Gilmour	Roberta Dunlop	Gilmour moved to the Bangor West DEA.
20 Dec 2018	Bangor West	Green (NI)	James Hunter	James Barry McKee	

=== ‡ Changes of affiliation ===
Date	Electoral Area	Name	Previous affiliation	New affiliation	Circumstance
6 Feb 2015	Bangor Central	Noelle Robinson	Green (NI)	Independent	Resigned.
11 Dec 2015	Bangor East and Donaghadee	Alan Chambers	Independent	UUP	Joined.
11 Apr 2016	Holywood and Clandeboye	Daniel Allen	UUP	Independent	Resigned.
16 Aug 2016	Holywood and Clandeboye	Daniel Allen	Independent	DUP	Joined.

Last update 26 March 2019.

Current composition: see Ards and North Down Borough Council
