= Committee for Justice =

The Committee for Justice is a Northern Ireland Assembly committee established to advise, assist and scrutinise the work of the Department of Justice and the Minister of Justice (currently Naomi Long). The Committee undertakes a scrutiny, policy development and consultation role with respect to the Department of Justice and plays a key role in the consideration and development of legislation.

The committee was created following the devolution of policing and justice on 12 April 2010, as a result of the Hillsborough Castle Agreement, agreed under the premiership of Gordon Brown on 5 February 2010.

== Membership ==
Membership of the committee is as follows:

Party	Member	Constituency
DUP	Paul Frew MLA (Chairperson)	North Antrim
Sinn Féin	Deirdre Hargey MLA (Deputy Chairperson)	Belfast South
Sinn Féin	Danny Baker MLA	Belfast West
UUP	Doug Beattie MLA	Upper Bann
DUP	Maurice Bradley MLA	East Londonderry
DUP	Stephen Dunne MLA	North Down
Alliance	Connie Egan MLA	North Down
Sinn Féin	Ciara Ferguson MLA	Foyle
SDLP	Patsy McGlone MLA	Mid Ulster

== 2022–2027 Assembly ==
The committee met for the first time in the 2022–2027 Assembly on 15 February 2024.

Party	Member	Constituency
DUP	Joanne Bunting MLA (Chairperson)	Belfast East
Sinn Féin	Deirdre Hargey MLA (Deputy Chairperson)	Belfast South
UUP	Doug Beattie MLA	Upper Bann
DUP	Maurice Bradley MLA	East Londonderry
Alliance	Stewart Dickson MLA	East Antrim
Ind. Unionist	Alex Easton MLA	North Down
Sinn Féin	Sinéad Ennis MLA	South Down
Sinn Féin	Ciara Ferguson MLA	Foyle
SDLP	Justin McNulty MLA	Newry and Armagh

=== Changes 2022–2027 ===
Date	Outgoing member and party	Constituency	→	New member and party	Constituency
9 May 2024	Deirdre Hargey MLA (Deputy Chairperson, Sinn Féin)	Belfast South	→	Sinéad Ennis MLA (Deputy Chairperson, Sinn Féin)	South Down
28 May 2024	Sinéad Ennis MLA (Deputy Chairperson, Sinn Féin)	South Down	→	Deirdre Hargey MLA (Deputy Chairperson, Sinn Féin)	Belfast South
5 July 2024	Alex Easton MLA (Independent Unionist)	North Down	→	Vacant	
16 September 2024	Vacant		→	Stephen Dunne MLA (DUP)	North Down
11 November 2024	Stewart Dickson MLA (Alliance)	East Antrim	→	Connie Egan MLA (Alliance)	North Down
2 December 2024	Sinéad Ennis MLA (Sinn Féin)	South Down	→	Jemma Dolan MLA (Sinn Féin)	Fermanagh and South Tyrone
10 February 2025	Jemma Dolan MLA (Sinn Féin)	Fermanagh and South Tyrone	→	Danny Baker MLA (Sinn Féin)	Belfast West
8 September 2025	Justin McNulty MLA (Sinn Féin)	Newry and Armagh	→	Patsy McGlone MLA (Sinn Féin)	Mid Ulster
15 September 2025	Joanne Bunting MLA (Chairperson, DUP)	Belfast East	→	Paul Frew MLA (Chairperson, DUP)	North Antrim
23 September 2025	Joanne Bunting MLA (DUP)	Belfast East	→	Paul Frew MLA (DUP)	North Antrim
23 September 2025	Stephen Dunne MLA (DUP)	North Down	→	Brian Kingston MLA (DUP)	Belfast North

== 2017–2022 Assembly ==
The committee met for the first time in the 2017–2022 Assembly on 22 January 2020.

Party	Member	Constituency
DUP	Paul Givan MLA (Chairperson)	Lagan Valley
Sinn Féin	Linda Dillon MLA (Deputy Chairperson)	Mid Ulster
UUP	Doug Beattie MLA	Upper Bann
DUP	Gordon Dunne MLA	North Down
DUP	Paul Frew MLA	North Antrim
Sinn Féin	Raymond McCartney MLA	Foyle
SDLP	Patsy McGlone MLA	Mid Ulster
Sinn Féin	Pat Sheehan MLA	Belfast West
Green (NI)	Rachel Woods MLA	North Down

=== Changes 2017–2022 ===
Date	Outgoing member and party	Constituency	→	New member and party	Constituency
3 February 2020	Raymond McCartney MLA (Sinn Féin)	Foyle	→	Vacant	
17 February 2020	Vacant		→	Martina Anderson MLA (Sinn Féin)	Foyle
9 March 2020	Martina Anderson MLA (Sinn Féin)	Foyle	→	Emma Rogan MLA (Sinn Féin)	South Down
16 March 2020	Pat Sheehan MLA (Sinn Féin)	Belfast West	→	Jemma Dolan MLA (Sinn Féin)	Fermanagh and South Tyrone
26 May 2020	Patsy McGlone MLA (SDLP)	Mid Ulster	→	Sinéad Bradley MLA (SDLP)	South Down
3 November 2020	Karen Mullan MLA (Sinn Féin)	Foyle	→	Pat Sheehan MLA (Sinn Féin)	Belfast West
14 June 2021	Paul Givan MLA (Chairperson, DUP)	Lagan Valley	→	Mervyn Storey MLA (Chairperson, DUP)	North Antrim
21 June 2021	Paul Frew MLA (DUP)	North Antrim	→	Robin Newton MLA (DUP)	Belfast North
21 June 2021	Gordon Dunne MLA (DUP)	North Down	→	Peter Weir MLA (DUP)	Strangford
2 August 2021	Linda Dillon MLA (Deputy Chairperson, Sinn Féin)	Mid Ulster	→	Sinéad Ennis MLA (Deputy Chairperson, Sinn Féin)	South Down

== 2016–2017 Assembly ==
The committee met for the first time in the 2016–2017 Assembly on 1 June 2016.

Party	Member	Constituency
DUP	Paul Frew MLA (Chairperson)	North Antrim
DUP	Pam Cameron MLA (Deputy Chairperson)	South Antrim
SDLP	Alex Attwood MLA	Belfast West
Green (NI)	Clare Bailey MLA	Belfast South
UUP	Doug Beattie MLA	Upper Bann
UUP	Roy Beggs Jr MLA	East Antrim
Sinn Féin	Michaela Boyle MLA	West Tyrone
DUP	Sammy Douglas MLA	Belfast East
Sinn Féin	Declan Kearney MLA	South Antrim
Alliance	Trevor Lunn MLA	Lagan Valley
Sinn Féin	Pat Sheehan MLA	Belfast West

== 2011–2016 Assembly ==
The committee met for the first time in the 2011–2016 Assembly on 26 May 2011.

Party	Member	Constituency
DUP	Paul Givan MLA (Chairperson)	Lagan Valley
Sinn Féin	Raymond McCartney MLA (Deputy Chairperson)	Foyle
DUP	Sydney Anderson MLA	Upper Bann
Alliance	Stewart Dickson MLA	East Antrim
SDLP	Colum Eastwood MLA	Foyle
Sinn Féin	Seán Lynch MLA	Fermanagh and South Tyrone
SDLP	Alban Maginness MLA	Belfast North
Sinn Féin	Jennifer McCann MLA	Belfast West
UUP	Basil McCrea MLA	Lagan Valley
DUP	Peter Weir MLA	North Down
DUP	Jim Wells MLA	South Down

=== Changes 2011–2016 ===
Date	Outgoing member and party	Constituency	→	New member and party	Constituency
23 April 2012	Colum Eastwood MLA (SDLP)	Foyle	→	Patsy McGlone MLA (SDLP)	Mid Ulster
23 April 2012	Basil McCrea MLA (UUP)	Lagan Valley	→	Tom Elliott MLA (UUP)	Fermanagh and South Tyrone
10 September 2012	Jennifer McCann MLA (Sinn Féin)	Belfast West	→	Rosie McCorley MLA (Sinn Féin)	Belfast West
1 October 2012	Sydney Anderson MLA (DUP)	Upper Bann	→	William Humphrey MLA (DUP)	Belfast North
1 October 2012	Peter Weir MLA (DUP)	North Down	→	Alex Easton MLA (DUP)	North Down
15 September 2013	Alex Easton MLA (DUP)	North Down	→	Sydney Anderson MLA (DUP)	Upper Bann
6 October 2014	Sydney Anderson MLA (DUP)	Upper Bann	→	Sammy Douglas MLA (DUP)	Belfast East
6 October 2014	William Humphrey MLA (DUP)	Belfast North	→	Paul Frew MLA (DUP)	North Antrim
6 October 2014	Jim Wells MLA (DUP)	South Down	→	Edwin Poots MLA (DUP)	Lagan Valley
6 October 2014	Rosie McCorley MLA (Sinn Féin)	Belfast West	→	Chris Hazzard MLA (DUP)	South Down
10 December 2014	Paul Givan MLA (Chairperson, DUP)	Lagan Valley	→	Alastair Ross MLA (Chairperson, DUP)	East Antrim
30 June 2015	Tom Elliott MLA (UUP)	Fermanagh and South Tyrone	→	Neil Somerville MLA (UUP)	Fermanagh and South Tyrone
15 September 2015	Chris Hazzard MLA (Sinn Féin)	South Down	→	Bronwyn McGahan MLA (Sinn Féin)	Fermanagh and South Tyrone
30 November 2015	Neil Somerville MLA (UUP)	Fermanagh and South Tyrone	→	Danny Kennedy MLA (UUP)	Newry and Armagh
8 February 2016	Patsy McGlone MLA (SDLP)	Mid Ulster	→	Alex Attwood MLA (SDLP)	Belfast West

== 2007–2011 Assembly ==
The committee met for the first time in the 2007–2011 Assembly on 22 April 2010.

Party	Member	Constituency
DUP	Maurice Morrow MLA (Chairperson)	Fermanagh and South Tyrone
Sinn Féin	Raymond McCartney MLA (Deputy Chairperson)	Foyle
DUP	Jonathan Bell MLA	Strangford
DUP	Jeffrey Donaldson MLA	Lagan Valley
UUP	Tom Elliott MLA	Fermanagh and South Tyrone
DUP	Jeffrey Donaldson MLA	Lagan Valley
SDLP	Dolores Kelly MLA	Upper Bann
SDLP	Alban Maginness MLA	Belfast North
UUP	David McNarry MLA	Strangford
Sinn Féin	Carál Ní Chuilín MLA	Belfast North
DUP	Alastair Ross MLA	East Antrim

=== Changes 2007–2011 ===
Date	Outgoing member and party	Constituency	→	New member and party	Constituency
25 May 2010	Dolores Kelly MLA (SDLP)	Upper Bann	→	Conall McDevitt MLA (SDLP)	Belfast South
10 June 2010	Jeffrey Donaldson MLA (DUP)	Lagan Valley	→	Vacant	
25 June 2010	Alastair Ross MLA (DUP)	East Antrim	→	Vacant	
28 June 2010	Vacant		→	Paul Givan MLA (DUP)	Lagan Valley
21 July 2010	Jonathan Bell MLA (DUP)	Strangford	→	Vacant	
14 September 2009	Vacant		→	Wallace Browne MLA (DUP)	Belfast East
14 September 2009	Vacant		→	Tom Buchanan MLA (DUP)	West Tyrone
9 November 2010	Tom Elliott MLA (UUP)	Fermanagh and South Tyrone	→	Reg Empey MLA (UUP)	Belfast East

== See also ==
- Committee
