= Windsor Framework Democratic Scrutiny Committee =

The Windsor Framework Democratic Scrutiny Committee was established to assist with the observation and implementation of Article 13(3a) and (4) of the Windsor Framework, which is a legal agreement between the European Union and the United Kingdom which adjusts the operation of the Northern Ireland Protocol. These are the parts of the Framework which set out the processes for how new, and amending or replacement EU law may apply in Northern Ireland.

In order to operationalise the democratic mechanisms included within the Windsor framework, the UK parliament approved regulations, known as the "Stormont brake".

== Membership ==
Membership of the Committee is as follows:

Party	Member	Constituency
Sinn Féin	Ciara Ferguson MLA (Chairperson)	Foyle
DUP	David Brooks MLA (Deputy Chairperson)	Belfast East
UUP	Steve Aiken MLA	South Antrim
DUP	Jonathan Buckley MLA	Upper Bann
Sinn Féin	Declan Kearney MLA	South Antrim
DUP	Peter Martin MLA	North Down
Alliance	Kate Nicholl MLA	Belfast South
Sinn Féin	Emma Sheerin MLA	Mid Ulster
Alliance	Eóin Tennyson MLA	Upper Bann

== 2022–2027 Assembly ==
Party	Member	Constituency
Sinn Féin	Philip McGuigan MLA (Chairperson)	North Antrim
DUP	David Brooks MLA (Deputy Chairperson)	Belfast East
UUP	Steve Aiken MLA	South Antrim
Alliance	Patrick Brown MLA	South Down
DUP	Jonathan Buckley MLA	Upper Bann
DUP	Joanne Bunting MLA	Belfast North
Alliance	Sorcha Eastwood MLA	Lagan Valley
Sinn Féin	Declan Kearney MLA	South Antrim
Sinn Féin	Emma Sheerin MLA	Mid Ulster

=== Changes 2022–2027 ===
Date	Outgoing member and party	Constituency	→	New member and party	Constituency
22 April 2024	Sorcha Eastwood MLA (Alliance)	Lagan Valley	→	Eóin Tennyson MLA (Alliance)	Upper Bann
23 April 2024	Patrick Brown MLA (Alliance)	South Down	→	Vacant	
20 May 2024	Vacant		→	Connie Egan MLA (Alliance)	North Down
3 June 2024	Jonathan Buckley MLA (DUP)	Upper Bann	→	Stephen Dunne MLA (DUP)	North Down
9 September 2024	Connie Egan MLA (Alliance)	North Down	→	Kate Nicholl MLA (Alliance)	Belfast South
16 September 2024	Stephen Dunne MLA (DUP)	North Down	→	Jonathan Buckley MLA (DUP)	Upper Bann
3 February 2025	Philip McGuigan MLA (Chairperson, Sinn Féin)	North Antrim	→	Ciara Ferguson MLA (Chairperson, Sinn Féin)	Foyle
8 May 2025	Joanne Bunting MLA (DUP)	Belfast East	→	Peter Martin MLA (DUP)	North Down

== See also ==
- Windsor Framework
- Northern Ireland Assembly
