= 2019 Ards and North Down Borough Council election =

2019 Northern Irish local government election

- 2 May 2019

All 40 council seats 21 seats needed for a majority
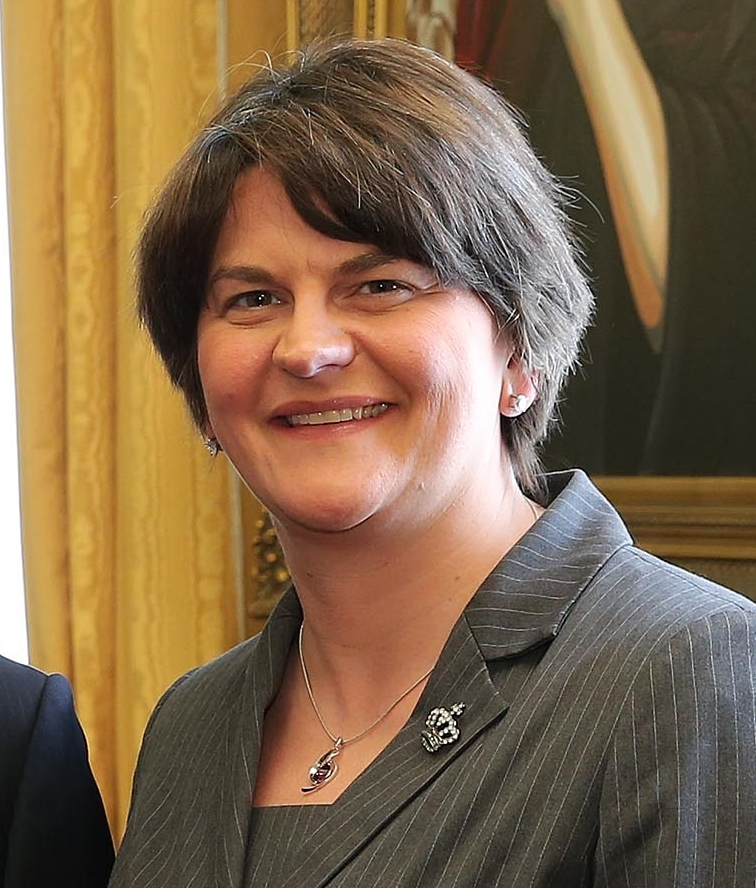

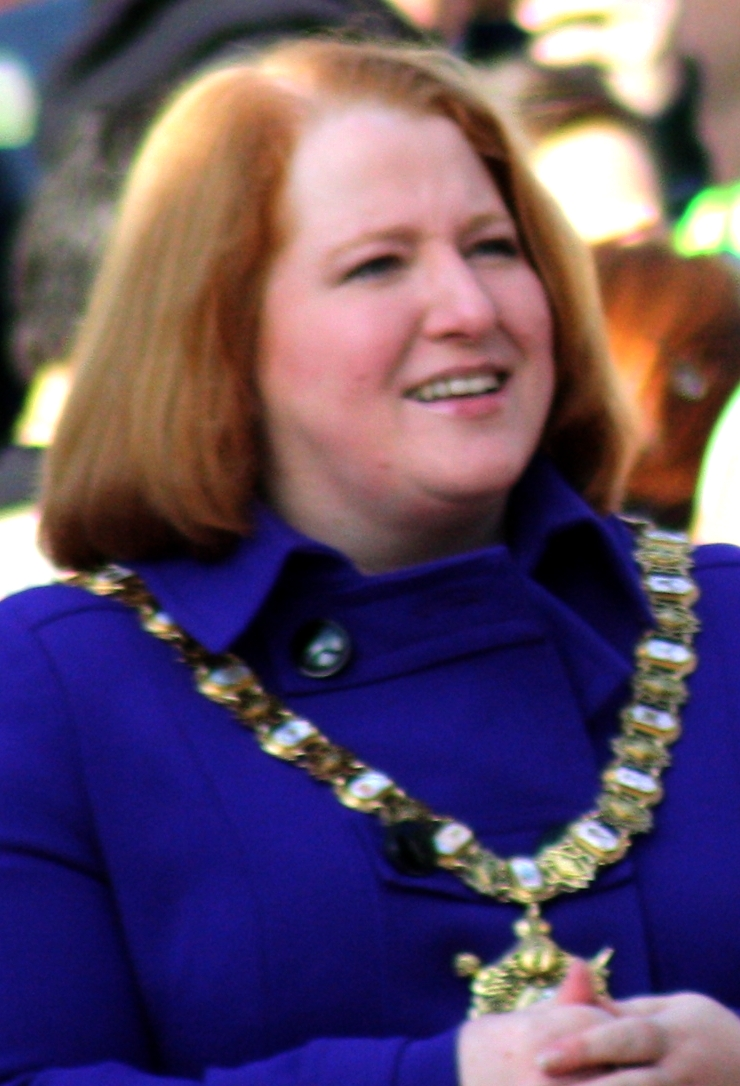

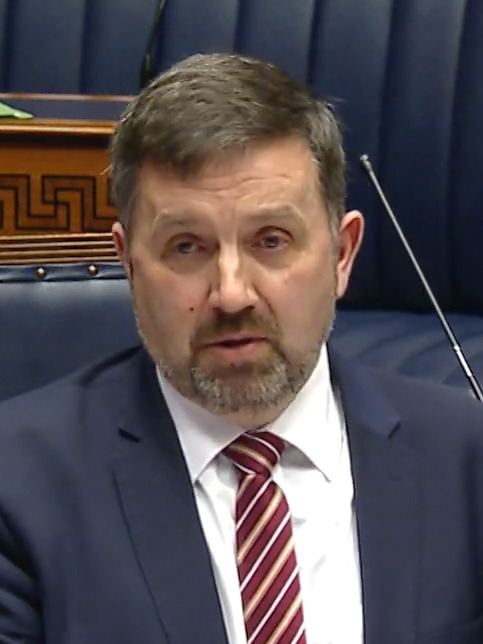

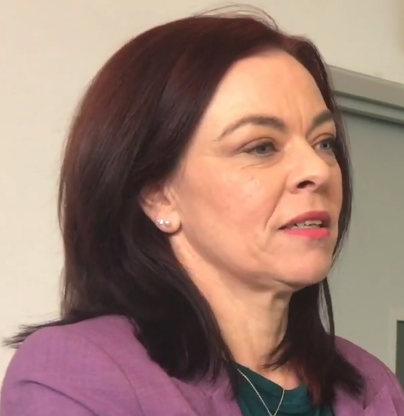

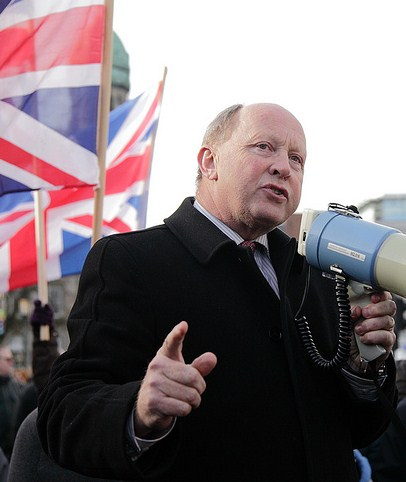

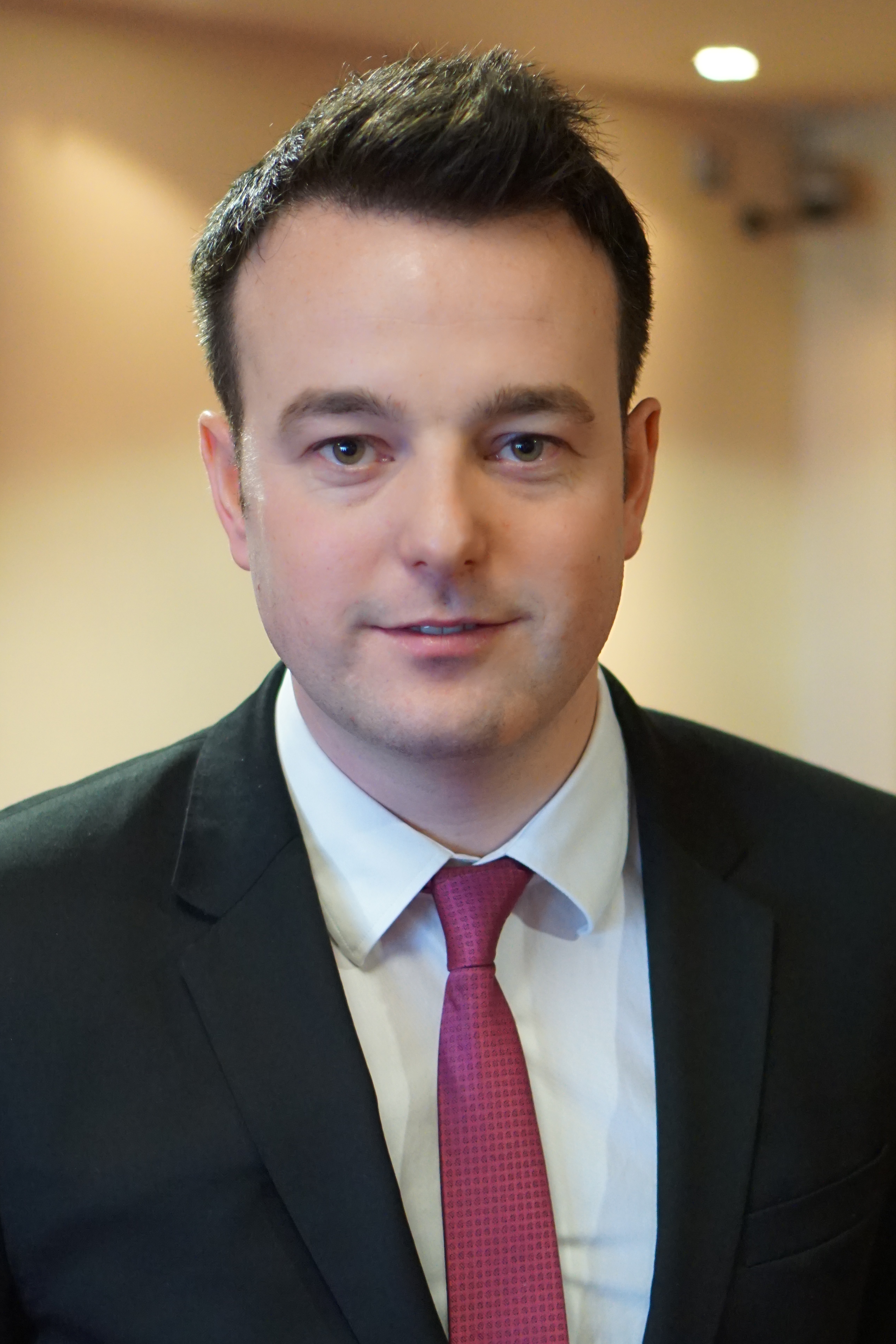
	First party	Second party	Third party
Leader	Arlene Foster	Naomi Long	Robin Swann
Party	DUP	Alliance	UUP
Seats before	17	7	9
Seats won	14	10	8
Seat change	▼3	▲3	▼1
	Fourth party	Fifth party	Sixth party
Leader	Clare Bailey	Jim Allister	Colum Eastwood
Party	Green (NI)	TUV	SDLP
Seats before	3	1	1
Seats won	3	1	1
Seat change	0	0	0
	Seventh party
Party	Independent
Seats before	2
Seats won	3
Seat change	▲1
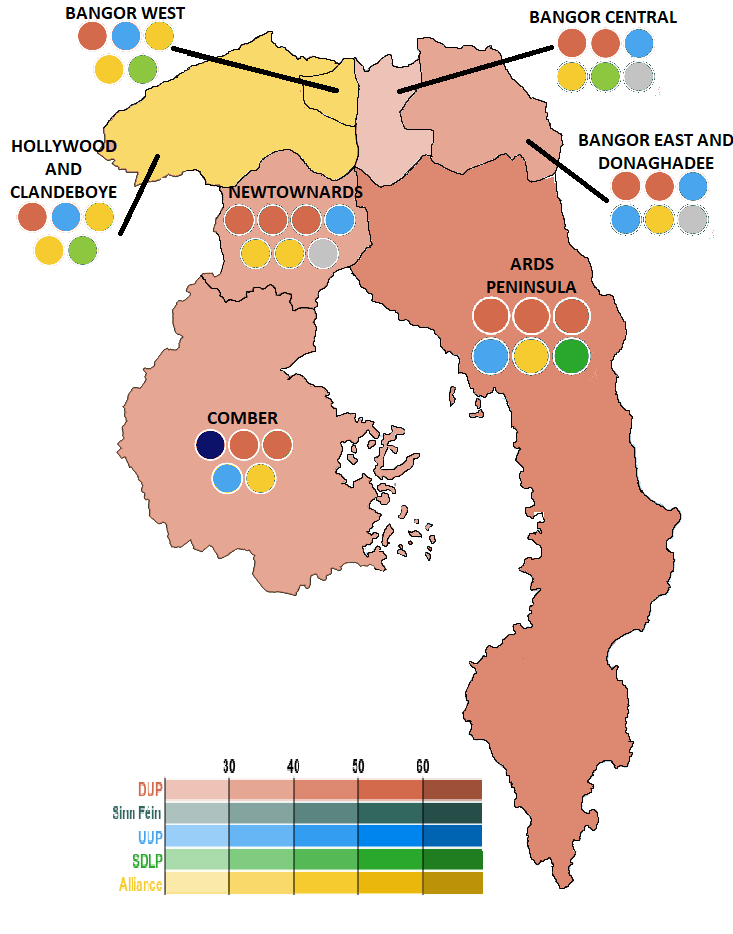
- Ards and North Down 2019 Council Election Results by DEA (Shaded by plurality of FPVs)

The second election to Ards and North Down Borough Council, part of the Northern Ireland local elections on 2 May 2019, returned 40 members to the council via Single Transferable Vote. The Democratic Unionist Party once again won a plurality of seats.

== Election results ==
Ards and North Down Borough Council Election Result 2019
Party	Seats	Gains	Losses	Net gain/loss	Seats %	Votes %	Votes	+/−
DUP	14	0	3	▼3	35.0	33.4	16,759	▼2.0
Alliance	10	3	0	▲3	25.0	22.2	11,162	▲8.8
UUP	8	1	2	▼1	20.0	17.8	8,943	▲0.4
Green (NI)	3	0	0	0	7.5	10.2	5,106	▲5.8
Independent	3	2	1	▲1	7.5	8.6	4,321	▼1.1
SDLP	1	0	0	0	2.5	3.2	1,621	▼1.0
TUV	1	0	0	0	2.5	1.4	695	▼3.4
UKIP	0	0	0	0	0.0	1.3	672	▼1.2
NI Conservatives	0	0	0	0	0.0	1.3	660	▼2.0
Sinn Féin	0	0	0	0	0.0	0.5	267	▼0.3

Note: "Votes" are the first preference votes.

The overall turnout was 43.80% with a total of 50,206 valid votes cast. A total of 660 ballots were rejected.

== Districts summary ==
Results of the Ards and North Down Borough Council election, 2019 by district
Ward	%	Cllrs	%	Cllrs	%	Cllrs	%	Cllrs	%	Cllrs	%	Cllrs	%	Cllrs	Total Cllrs
Ward	DUP		Alliance		UUP		Green		SDLP		Sinn Féin		Others		Total Cllrs
Ards Peninsula	47.8	3	10.6	1	10.6	1	4.1	0	20.7	1	2.5	0	3.7	0	6
Bangor Central	26.1	2	18.3	1	17.7	1	14.2	1	0.0	0	0.0	0	23.8	1	6
Bangor East and Donaghadee	31.2	2	17.1	1	30.1	2	9.7	0	0.0	0	0.0	0	11.9	0	6
Bangor West	30.5	1	32.5	2	17.2	1	16.6	1	0.0	0	1.2	0	2.0	0	5
Comber	37.9	2	23.2	1	21.4	1	5.7	0	0.0	0	0.0	0	11.7	0	5
Holywood and Clandeboye	26.6	1	38.7	2	13.5	1	19.2	1	0.0	0	0.0	0	2.1	0	5
Newtownards	32.4	3	20.0	2	14.6	1	4.5	0	0.0	0	0.0	0	28.6	1	7
Total	33.4	14	22.2	10	17.8	8	10.2	3	3.2	1	0.5	0	12.6	4	40

== District results ==
=== Ards Peninsula ===
2014: 3 x DUP, 1 x SDLP, 1 x UUP, 1 x Alliance
2019: 3 x DUP, 1 x SDLP, 1 x UUP, 1 x Alliance
2014-2019 Change: No change

Ards Peninsula - 6 seats
Party	Candidate	FPv%	Count						
Party	Candidate	FPv%	1	2	3	4	5	6	7
DUP	Robert Adair*	27.93%	2,189						
SDLP	Joe Boyle*	20.68%	1,621						
DUP	Nigel Edmund*	9.38%	735	1,511.5					
DUP	Eddie Thompson*	10.48%	821	931	934.15	1,273.15			
UUP	Angus Carson*	10.62%	832	943.5	968.7	995.45	1,020.2	1,132	
Alliance	Lorna McAlpine*	10.62%	832	849	1,079.65	1,083.9	1,085.75	1,088.95	1,124.95
Green (NI)	Michele Strong	4.07%	319	333	372.9	375.9	383.25	388.25	434.25
Sinn Féin	Murdoch McKibbin	2.50%	196	197.5	380.9	381.4	382.4	382.6	384.6
UKIP	Matt Davey	2.98%	234	267.5	274.15	279.15	291.15	322.55	
NI Conservatives	Tim Mullen	0.74%	58	61	62.05	63.05			
Electorate: 17,582 Valid: 7,837 (44.57%) Spoilt: 119 Quota: 1,120 Turnout: 7,956 (45.25%)

=== Bangor Central ===
2014: 2 x DUP, 2 x UUP, 1 x Alliance, 1 x Greens
2019: 2 x DUP, 1 x Alliance, 1 x Greens, 1 x UUP, 1 x Independent
2014-2019 Change: Independent gain from UUP

Bangor Central - 6 seats
Party	Candidate	FPv%	Count										
Party	Candidate	FPv%	1	2	3	4	5	6	7	8	9	10	11
Alliance	Karen Douglas*	18.29%	1,346										
Green (NI)	Stephen Dunlop	14.22%	1,046	1,220.9									
DUP	Alistair Cathcart*	10.70%	787	789.86	789.86	789.86	816.86	832.86	1,052.08				
UUP	Craig Blaney	10.29%	757	774.38	777.38	788.16	818.04	862.24	871.46	903.76	1,324.76		
DUP	Wesley Irvine* ‡	11.93%	878	879.1	879.1	880.42	915.42	926.42	956.64	966.08	1,047.84	1,191.84	
Independent	Ray McKimm	6.84%	503	517.08	526.74	553.36	572.36	603.46	608.46	783.76	827.98	903.98	933.98
Independent	Noelle Robinson*	5.75%	423	446.76	461.3	491.88	513.1	543.2	544.2	681.46	723.62	769.62	788.62
UUP	Ian Henry	7.37%	542	555.86	556.86	568.74	588.96	635.6	641.6	664.8			
Independent	Maria Lourenço	4.92%	362	389.6	392.5	441.78	454.32	472.2	473.42				
DUP	James Cochrane	3.47%	255	255.66	256.66	256.88	273.88	277.88					
NI Conservatives	Frank Shivers	2.85%	210	215.06	215.06	221.66	238.1						
UKIP	John Montgomery	2.92%	215	217.42	217.42	220.06							
Independent	Gavan Reynolds	0.45%	33	35.86									
Electorate: 18,166 Valid: 7,357 (40.50%) Spoilt: 93 Quota: 1,052 Turnout: 7,450 (41.01%)

=== Bangor East and Donaghadee ===
2014: 3 x DUP, 1 x UUP, 1 x Alliance, 1 x Independent
2019: 2 x UUP, 2 x DUP, 1 x Alliance, 1 x Independent
2014-2019 Change: UUP gain from Independent, Independent leaves DUP

Bangor East and Donaghadee - 6 seats
Party	Candidate	FPv%	Count							
Party	Candidate	FPv%	1	2	3	4	5	6	7	8
UUP	Mark Brooks*	17.47%	1,327							
Alliance	Gavin Walker*	17.15%	1,303							
UUP	David Chambers*	12.67%	963	1,006	1,144.78					
DUP	Peter Martin* †	11.87%	902	905	908.24	913.28	916.97	1,413.97		
DUP	Bill Keery* ‡	10.06%	764	775	784	787.6	799.12	965.2	1,280.72	
Independent	Tom Smith*	10.06%	765	805	844.06	904.9	922.27	966.31	973.79	1,056.75
Green (NI)	Hannah McNamara	9.67%	735	752	772.88	915.62	929.3	947.44	950.16	986.2
DUP	Janice MacArthur	9.24%	702	711	733.14	737.28	746.82			
NI Conservatives	Paul Leeman	1.80%	137							
Electorate: 17,416 Valid: 7,598 (43.63%) Spoilt: 98 Quota: 1,086 Turnout: 7,696 (44.19%)

=== Bangor West ===
2014: 2 x DUP, 1 x Alliance, 1 x UUP, 1 x Green
2019: 2 x Alliance, 1 x DUP, 1 x UUP, 1 x Green
2014-2019 Change: Alliance gain from DUP

Bangor West - 5 seats
Party	Candidate	FPv%	Count		
Party	Candidate	FPv%	1	2	3
Alliance	Connie Egan †	20.16%	1,151		
DUP	Jennifer Gilmour	17.34%	990		
UUP	Marion Smith*	17.20%	982		
Green (NI)	Barry McKee	16.62%	949	1,022	
Alliance	Scott Wilson*	12.32%	703	746	930.79
DUP	Alan Graham*	13.12%	749	787	791.42
NI Conservatives	Ben English	2.00%	114		
Sinn Féin	Kieran Maxwell	1.24%	71		
Electorate: 13,585 Valid: 5,709 (42.02%) Spoilt: 85 Quota: 952 Turnout: 5,794 (42.65%)

=== Comber ===
2014: 2 x DUP, 1 x Alliance, 1 x UUP, 1 x TUV
2019: 2 x DUP, 1 x Alliance, 1 x UUP, 1 x TUV
2014-2019 Change: No change

Comber - 5 seats
Party	Candidate	FPv%	Count					
Party	Candidate	FPv%	1	2	3	4	5	6
Alliance	Deborah Girvan* †	23.23%	1,516					
UUP	Philip Smith	16.58%	1,082	1,178.3				
DUP	Trevor Cummings*	12.91%	843	856.8	895.5	901.8	1,298.8	
DUP	Robert Gibson*	15.09%	985	992.5	1,024.5	1,028.7	1,201.7	
TUV	Stephen Cooper* ‡	10.65%	695	716	819.3	828	887	1,065
Green (NI)	Ricky Bamford	5.70%	372	582.3	737.4	780.6	797.6	816.6
DUP	John Montgomery	9.85%	643	648.7	689.5	693.1		
UUP	Michael Palmer	4.87%	318	361.8				
Independent	John Sloan	1.12%	73	100				
Electorate: 14,244 Valid: 6,527 (45.82%) Spoilt: 60 Quota: 1,088 Turnout: 6,587 (46.24%)

=== Holywood and Clandeboye ===
2014: 2 x DUP, 1 x Alliance, 1 x Green, 1 x UUP
2019: 2 x Alliance, 1 x Green, 1 x DUP, 1 x UUP
2014-2019 Change: Alliance gain from DUP

Holywood and Clandeboye - 5 seats
Party	Candidate	FPv%	Count						
Party	Candidate	FPv%	1	2	3	4	5	6	7
Alliance	Andrew Muir* †	20.43%	1,397						
Green (NI)	Rachel Woods †††	19.18%	1,311						
Alliance	Gillian Greer	18.27%	1,249						
DUP	Stephen Dunne* †	16.66%	1,139	1,171.4					
UUP	Carl McClean ‡	7.42%	507	557.04	599.82	683.19	725.94	729.9	1,143.9
DUP	Roberta Dunlop	9.90%	677	681.32	697.13	712.49	721.23	730.23	742.23
UUP	Tim Lemon	6.08%	416	505.64	563.92	645.74	701.6	705.92	
NI Conservatives	Andrew Turner	2.06%	141	218.4	269.55				
Electorate: 15,052 Valid: 6,837 (45.42%) Spoilt: 67 Quota: 1,140 Turnout: 6,904 (45.87%)

=== Newtownards ===
2014: 3 x DUP, 2 x UUP, 1 x Alliance, 1 x Independent
2019: 3 x DUP, 2 x Alliance, 1 x UUP, 1 x Independent
2014-2019 Change: Alliance gain from UUP

Newtownards - 7 seats
Party	Candidate	FPv%	Count						
Party	Candidate	FPv%	1	2	3	4	5	6	7
Independent	Jimmy Menagh* †	25.63%	2,138						
DUP	Naomi Armstrong*	14.77%	1,232						
Alliance	Nick Mathison †	13.08%	1,091						
DUP	Stephen McIlveen*	10.77%	898	1,127.1					
DUP	Colin Kennedy –	6.83%	570	771.84	919.59	924.07	988.03	1,055.03	
UUP	Richard Smart*	8.82%	736	964.52	970.97	979.45	986.99	1,040.12	1,076.12
Alliance	Alan McDowell*	6.88%	574	668.54	670.19	678.83	679.87	696.66	977.61
UUP	Ian Dickson	5.77%	481	585.98	599.78	602.09	607.29	677.47	734.16
Green (NI)	Maurice Macartney	4.49%	374	448.82	450.47	466.01	467.05	503.97	
UKIP	Paul Corry	2.67%	223	341.32	348.07	358.34	361.2		
Independent	Ben King	0.29%	24	61.12	61.42				
Electorate: 20,491 Valid: 8,341 (40.71%) Spoilt: 138 Quota: 1,043 Turnout: 8,479 (41.38%)

== Changes during the term ==
=== † Co-options ===
Date co-opted	Electoral Area	Party	Outgoing	Co-optee	Reason
11 October 2019	Holywood and Clandeboye	Green (NI)	Rachel Woods	Kathryn McNickle	Woods was co-opted to the Northern Ireland Assembly.
30 January 2020	Holywood and Clandeboye	Alliance	Andrew Muir	Martin McRandal	Muir was co-opted to the Northern Ireland Assembly.
11 May 2020	Bangor East and Donaghadee	DUP	Peter Martin	Janice MacArthur	Martin resigned.
19 July 2021	Holywood and Clandeboye	DUP	Stephen Dunne	Peter Johnson	Dunne was co-opted to the Northern Ireland Assembly.
12 October 2021	Holywood and Clandeboye	Green (NI)	Kathryn McNickle	Lauren Kendall	McNickle resigned.
5 May 2022	Newtownards	Independent	Jimmy Menagh	Steven Irvine	Menagh died.
25 May 2022	Newtownards	Alliance	Nick Mathison	Vicky Moore	Mathison was elected to the Northern Ireland Assembly.
25 May 2022	Bangor West	Alliance	Connie Egan	Hannah Irwin	Egan was elected to the Northern Ireland Assembly.
22 September 2022	Holywood and Clandeboye	Green (NI)	Lauren Kendall	Rachel Woods	Kendall resigned.
6 January 2023	Comber	Alliance	Deborah Girvan	Patricia Morgan	Girvan resigned.
31 March 2023	Holywood and Clandeboye	Alliance	Gillian Greer	vacant	Greer resigned but was not replaced before May election.

=== ‡ Changes in affiliation ===
Date	Electoral Area	Name	Previous affiliation	New affiliation	Circumstance
19 Apr 2021	Bangor East and Donaghadee	Bill Keery	DUP	Independent	Suspended from the DUP following controversial comments about Prince Philip.
2 March 2022	Bangor Central	Wesley Irvine	DUP	Independent	Resigned from the DUP to support the re-election campaign of independent unionist MLA Alex Easton.
4 January 2023	Holywood and Clandeboye	Carl McClean	UUP	Independent	Resigned from the UUP following criticisms of the party's candidate selection process.
13 January 2023	Holywood and Clandeboye	Carl McClean	Independent	DUP	Joined the DUP following his period as an independent.
8 February 2023	Comber	Stephen Cooper	TUV	Independent	Left the TUV following an allegation of harassment from a female party member.

=== – Suspensions ===
Colin Kennedy (DUP) was suspended from the council for six weeks from Friday 18 June 2021.

Last update 8 February 2023.

Current composition: see Ards and North Down Borough Council.
