= Holywood and Clandeboye (District Electoral Area) =

Electoral district in Northern Ireland

- Ards and North Down Borough Council DEA constituency

Current constituency
- Created: 2014
- Seats: 5 (2014–)
- Councillors: Alan Graham (DUP); Stephen Hollywood (UUP); Lauren Kendall (GPNI); Gillian McCollum (APNI); Martin McRandal (APNI)

Holywood and Clandeboye DEA within Ards and North Down

Holywood and Clandeboye is one of the seven district electoral areas (DEA) in Ards and North Down, Northern Ireland. The district elects five members to Ards and North Down Borough Council and contains the wards of Clandeboye, Cultra, Helen's Bay, Holywood and Loughview. Holywood and Clandeboye forms part of the North Down constituencies for the Northern Ireland Assembly and UK Parliament.

It was created for the 2014 local elections, largely replacing the Holywood DEA, which had existed since 1985.

== Councillors ==
Election	Councillor (Party)	Councillor (Party)	Councillor (Party)	Councillor (Party)	Councillor (Party)
November 2025 Co-Option	Martin McRandal (Alliance)	Gillian McCollum (Alliance)	Lauren Kendall (Green Party)	Alan Graham (DUP)	Stephen Hollywood (UUP)
October 2024 Co-Option	Martin McRandal (Alliance)	Gillian McCollum (Alliance)	Lauren Kendall (Green Party)	Alan Graham (DUP)	Linzi McLaren (UUP)
October 2023 Co-Option	Martin McRandal (Alliance)	David Rossiter (Alliance)	Lauren Kendall (Green Party)	Alan Graham (DUP)	Linzi McLaren (UUP)
2023	Martin McRandal (Alliance)	David Rossiter (Alliance)	Rachel Woods (Green Party)	Alan Graham (DUP)	Linzi McLaren (UUP)
January 2023 Defection	Martin McRandal (Alliance)	Gillian Greer (Alliance)	Rachel Woods (Green Party)	Peter Johnson (DUP)	Carl McClean (DUP)/ UUP)
September 2022 Co-Option	Martin McRandal (Alliance)	Gillian Greer (Alliance)	Rachel Woods (Green Party)	Peter Johnson (DUP)	Carl McClean (DUP)/ UUP)
October 2021 Co-Option	Martin McRandal (Alliance)	Gillian Greer (Alliance)	Lauren Kendall (Green Party)	Peter Johnson (DUP)	Carl McClean (DUP)/ UUP)
July 2021 Co-Option	Martin McRandal (Alliance)	Gillian Greer (Alliance)	Lauren Kendall (Green Party)	Stephen Dunne (DUP)	Carl McClean (DUP)/ UUP)
January 2020 Co-Option	Martin McRandal (Alliance)	Gillian Greer (Alliance)	Kathryn McNickle (Green Party)	Stephen Dunne (DUP)	Carl McClean (DUP)/ UUP)
September 2019 Co-Option	Andrew Muir (Alliance)	Gillian Greer (Alliance)	Kathryn McNickle (Green Party)	Stephen Dunne (DUP)	Carl McClean (DUP)/ UUP)
2019	Andrew Muir (Alliance)	Gillian Greer (Alliance)	Rachel Woods (Green Party)	Stephen Dunne (DUP)	Carl McClean (DUP)/ UUP)
March 2018 Co-Option	Andrew Muir (Alliance)	Roberta Dunlop (DUP)	Rachel Woods (Green Party)	Stephen Dunne (DUP)	Daniel Allen (DUP)/ UUP)
2016 Defection	Andrew Muir (Alliance)	Jennifer Gilmour (DUP)	John Barry (Green Party)	Stephen Dunne (DUP)	Daniel Allen (DUP)/ UUP)
2014	Andrew Muir (Alliance)	Jennifer Gilmour (DUP)	John Barry (Green Party)	Stephen Dunne (DUP)	Daniel Allen (DUP)/ UUP)

== 2023 Election ==
2019: 2 x Alliance, 1 x DUP, 1 x Green, 1 x UUP

2023: 2 x Alliance, 1 x DUP, 1 x Green, 1 x UUP

2019–2023 Change: No change

Holywood and Clandeboye - 5 seats
Party	Candidate	FPv%	Count				
Party	Candidate	FPv%	1	2	3	4	5
DUP	Alan Graham	14.39%	1,112	1,300			
UUP	Linzi McLaren †	12.80%	989	1,056	1,344		
Alliance	Martin McRandal*	15.81%	1,222	1,226	1,237	1,385	
Green (NI)	Rachel Woods* †	14.67%	1,134	1,144	1,186	1,361	
Alliance	David Rossiter †	13.90%	1,074	1,076	1,083	1,179	1,256.39
Alliance	Helen Corbett	11.32%	875	891	900	1,004	1,021.75
SDLP	Déirdre Vaughan	6.97%	539	541	549		
DUP	Carl McClean*	5.42%	419	483			
TUV	Diane Adams	4.71%	364				
Electorate: 15,973 Valid: 7,728 (48.38%) Spoilt: 87 Quota: 1,289 Turnout: 7,815 (48.93%)

== 2019 Election ==
2014: 2 x DUP, 1 x Alliance, 1 x Green, 1 x UUP

2019: 2 x Alliance, 1 x Green, 1 x DUP, 1 x UUP

2014-2019 Change: Alliance gain from DUP

Holywood and Clandeboye - 5 seats
Party	Candidate	FPv%	Count						
Party	Candidate	FPv%	1	2	3	4	5	6	7
Alliance	Andrew Muir* †	20.43%	1,397						
Green (NI)	Rachel Woods †††	19.18%	1,311						
Alliance	Gillian Greer	18.27%	1,249						
DUP	Stephen Dunne* †	16.66%	1,139	1,171.4					
UUP	Carl McClean ‡	7.42%	507	557.04	599.82	683.19	725.94	729.9	1,143.9
DUP	Roberta Dunlop	9.90%	677	681.32	697.13	712.49	721.23	730.23	742.23
UUP	Tim Lemon	6.08%	416	505.64	563.92	645.74	701.6	705.92	
NI Conservatives	Andrew Turner	2.06%	141	218.4	269.55				
Electorate: 15,052 Valid: 6,837 (45.42%) Spoilt: 67 Quota: 1,140 Turnout: 6,904 (45.87%)

== 2014 Election ==
2014: 2 x DUP, 1 x Alliance, 1 x UUP, 1 x Green

Holywood and Clandeboye - 5 seats
Party	Candidate	FPv%	Count						
Party	Candidate	FPv%	1	2	3	4	5	6	7
DUP	Stephen Dunne*	23.12%	1,423						
Alliance	Andrew Muir*	14.79%	910	922.88	983.16	1,013.44	1,154.44		
Green (NI)	John Barry* †	14.88%	916	933.92	988.76	1,024.04	1,098.04		
UUP	Daniel Allen ‡‡	10.06%	619	647.28	672.56	728.12	735.12	735.12	1,098.12
DUP	Jennifer Gilmour* †	8.77%	540	837.64	855.92	882.60	886.16	886.16	954.96
Alliance	Kate Nicholl	7.41%	456	460.48	485.04	518.32	586.16	710.16	759.4
UUP	James McKerrow*	7.72%	475	491.52	508.80	558.80	562.64	564.64	
SDLP	Peter Lismore	5.00%	308	311.36	319.64	326.64			
NI Conservatives	William O'Callaghan	4.31%	265	268.08	280.08				
NI21	Matthew Johnston	3.38%	208	210.8					
Independent	Gerard Leddy	0.55%	34	34.28					
Electorate: 14,158 Valid: 6,154 (43.47%) Spoilt: 75 Quota: 1,026 Turnout: 6,229 (44.00%)
