= Andrew Muir (politician) =

Northern Irish politician

Andrew Muir MLA
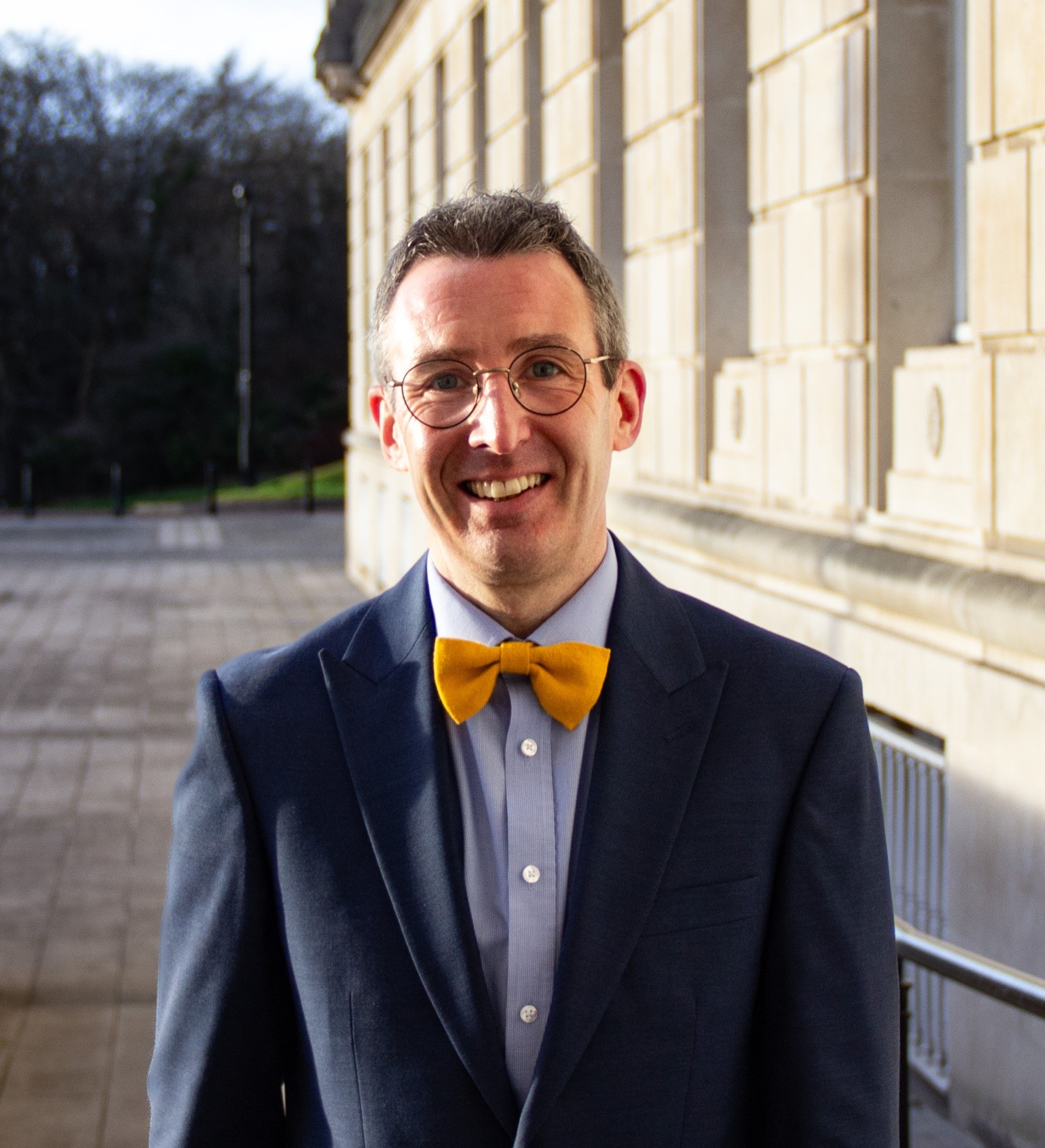

Minister of Agriculture, Environment and Rural Affairs
- Incumbent
- Assumed office 3 February 2024
- First Minister: Michelle O'Neill
- Preceded by: Edwin Poots (2022)

Member of the Northern Ireland Assembly for North Down
- Incumbent
- Assumed office 23 December 2019
- Preceded by: Stephen Farry

Member of Ards and North Down Borough Council
- In office 22 May 2014 – 30 January 2020
- Preceded by: Position established
- Succeeded by: Martin McRandal
- Constituency: Holywood and Clandeboye

Member of North Down Borough Council
- In office 31 July 2010 – 22 May 2014
- Preceded by: David Alderdice
- Succeeded by: Position abolished
- Constituency: Holywood

Personal details
- Born: Andrew David Muir; 9 July 1976 (age 50) Bangor, County Down, Northern Ireland
- Party: Alliance
- Education: University of Ulster
- Occupation: Politician
- Website: www.andrewmuir.net

Andrew Muir (born 9 July 1976) is a Northern Irish politician who has served as Minister of Agriculture, Environment and Rural Affairs since February 2024. He is an Alliance Party Member of the Legislative Assembly (MLA) for North Down. He was appointed as an MLA following incumbent Alliance MLA Stephen Farry's election as MP for North Down in the 2019 UK general election, and elected in the constituency in the 2022 Northern Ireland Assembly election.

== Professional life ==
In 1999, Muir graduated with a degree in Peace and Conflict Studies at Ulster University.

From 2006 until he became a full-time politician Muir worked as a Senior Project Manager at Translink. Before that he held a variety of low-level administrative posts including at Arts Council of Northern Ireland.

== Political career ==
=== Council (2010–2019) ===
Muir was co-opted onto North Down Borough Council in 2010, and was elected for the Holywood DEA at the 2011 local elections. He was elected on the first count with 22.73% of FPVs, but he did not top the poll as newly elected MLA Gordon Dunne out-polled him by 90 votes.

Muir became the first openly gay mayor in Northern Ireland when he became North Down Borough Council mayor from 2013 to 2014.

Muir was re-elected at the 2014 local election for the Holywood and Clandeboye DEA, following the local government reform that merged Ards and North Down borough councils. He ran as one of two Alliance candidates, with now- MLA for Belfast South Kate Nicholl being his running mate. He was elected behind Stephen Dunne, the son of Gordon Dunne, and now MLA for North Down.

Muir ran alongside Stephen Farry as an Alliance candidate at the 2016 Assembly election in North Down, and was runner up behind his party colleague.

Muir was subsequently re-elected at the 2019 local elections, topping the poll with 1,397 votes (20.43%). His running mate Gillian Greer was also elected on the first count and gained a seat at the expense of the DUP.

=== Member of the Legislative Assembly (2019–present) ===
Muir was selected by Alliance to replace Stephen Farry, the newly elected MP for North Down, and was co-opted into the Assembly. In doing so, he became the second openly gay member of the Assembly, after Alliance MLA John Blair (South Antrim).

He was selected to run as one of Alliance's two candidates in North Down for the 2022 Northern Ireland Assembly election and both he and his running mate, Connie Egan, were elected. He polled the second most FPVs (6,838) and 16.38% of the vote as Alliance increased their vote by 10.3% in the constituency.

== Minister of Agriculture, Environment and Rural Affairs (2024–present) ==
=== Appointment ===
On 3 February 2024, Muir was appointed Minister of Agriculture, Environment and Rural Affairs following the formation of the Executive of the 7th Northern Ireland Assembly. Muir became Northern Ireland's first openly gay government minister.

=== Tenure ===
On 5 March 2024, Muir confirmed that XL Bully-type dogs would not be banned in Northern Ireland despite new plans to restrict their ownership.

Muir announced on 2 May 2024 a ban on the sale and supply of single use vapes in Northern Ireland to be in place by April 2025.

Muir admitted on 3 September 2024 that there was the "potential" that the Executive breached the law in failing to improve water quality.

On 30 January 2025, Muir outlined his plans for a new Sustainable Agriculture Programme (SAP), stating that funding for agriculture in the future will be underpinned by "financial and environmental sustainability".

==== Animal Welfare ====
In his first ministerial engagement, Muir visited the Ulster Society for the Prevention of Cruelty to Animals (USPCA) in Newry, stating that animal welfare issues will be one of his top priorities. On 13 March 2024, Muir argued that the creation of an all-Ireland register of animal welfare offenders would be "untenable".

Muir announced on 14 May 2024 that he will introduce a motion in the Assembly to allow UK-wide legislation that would make pet abduction a specific criminal offence that could carry a jail sentence of up to five years apply in Northern Ireland.

Muir is facing intense scrutiny from the agricultural community following a controversial DAERA operation. That concerns a situation in which certain department teams euthanized more than 50 cattle. Muir defended the move as a legal necessity.

==== Lough Neagh ====
Muir pledged on 9 February 2024 that a plan to tackle the blue-green algae crisis at Lough Neagh would be published within weeks. On 13 March 2024, Muir told the Northern Ireland Assembly that £1.6m had been allocated by the Executive to his department in capital funding to tackle the Lough Neagh crisis. Muir said that a 37-point plan approved by the Executive to tackle the Lough Neagh crisis would be a "significant step" in helping to rehabilitate the Lough on 18 July 2024.

== Personal life ==
Muir came out as gay in 1996 and is a public advocate for LGBT issues in Northern Ireland.

He is known for his distinctive bow ties.

A keen runner, Muir has completed eleven marathons with a personal best of 3:07.
