= Bangor Central (District Electoral Area) =

Electoral district in Northern Ireland

- Ards and North Down Borough Council DEA constituency

Current constituency
- Created: 2014
- Seats: 6 (2014–)
- Councillors: Craig Blaney (UUP); Tom Brady (IND); Alistair Cathcart (DUP); Alex Harbinson (APNI); Wesley Irvine (IND); Chris McCracken (APNI)

Bangor Central DEA within Ards and North Down

Bangor Central is one of the seven district electoral areas (DEA) in Ards and North Down, Northern Ireland. The district elects six members to Ards and North Down Borough Council and contains the wards of Ballygrainey, Ballyholme, Bloomfield, Broadway, Castle and Harbour. Bangor Central forms greater of the North Down constituencies for the Northern Ireland Assembly and UK Parliament.

It was created for the 2014 local elections, largely replacing the Abbey DEA, which had existed since 1985.

== Councillors ==
Election	Councillor (Party)	Councillor (Party)	Councillor (Party)	Councillor (Party)	Councillor (Party)	Councillor (Party)
June 2025 Co-Option	Alex Harbinson (Alliance)	Chris McCracken (Alliance)	Tom Brady (Independent)	Craig Blaney (UUP)	Alistair Cathcart (DUP)	Wesley Irvine (DUP)/ (Independent)
September 2023 Co-Option	Alex Harbinson (Alliance)	Chris McCracken (Alliance)	Ray McKimm (Independent)	Craig Blaney (UUP)	Alistair Cathcart (DUP)	Wesley Irvine (DUP)/ (Independent)
2023	Karen Douglas (Alliance)	Chris McCracken (Alliance)	Ray McKimm (Independent)	Craig Blaney (UUP)	Alistair Cathcart (DUP)	Wesley Irvine (DUP)/ (Independent)
March 2022 Defection	Karen Douglas (Alliance)	Stephen Dunlop (Green Party)	Ray McKimm (Independent)	Craig Blaney (UUP)	Alistair Cathcart (DUP)	Wesley Irvine (DUP)/ (Independent)
2019	Karen Douglas (Alliance)	Stephen Dunlop (Green Party)	Ray McKimm (Independent)	Craig Blaney (UUP)	Alistair Cathcart (DUP)	Wesley Irvine (DUP)/ (Independent)
July 2016 Co-Option	Karen Douglas (Alliance)	Noelle Robinson (Green Party)/ (Independent)	Ian Henry (UUP)	Carl McClean (UUP)	Alistair Cathcart (DUP)	Wesley Irvine (DUP)/ (Independent)
February 2015 Defection	Stuart Anderson (Alliance)	Noelle Robinson (Green Party)/ (Independent)	Ian Henry (UUP)	Carl McClean (UUP)	Alistair Cathcart (DUP)	Wesley Irvine (DUP)/ (Independent)
2014	Stuart Anderson (Alliance)	Noelle Robinson (Green Party)/ (Independent)	Ian Henry (UUP)	Carl McClean (UUP)	Alistair Cathcart (DUP)	Wesley Irvine (DUP)/ (Independent)

== 2023 Election ==
2019: 2 x DUP, 1 x Alliance, 1 x UUP, 1 x Green, 1 x Independent

2023: 2 x Alliance, 2 x Independent, 1 x DUP, 1 x UUP

2019–2023 Change: Alliance and Independent gain from DUP and Green

Bangor Central - 6 seats
Party	Candidate	FPv%	Count								
Party	Candidate	FPv%	1	2	3	4	5	6	7	8	9
Alliance	Karen Douglas* †	16.31%	1,378								
Independent	Wesley Irvine*	16.20%	1,369								
DUP	Alistair Cathcart*	12.46%	1,053	1,053.84	1,061.84	1,091.36	1,107.68	1,397.68			
UUP	Craig Blaney*	10.85%	917	920.48	935.48	965.96	1,205.28	1,225.28			
Alliance	Chris McCracken	7.88%	666	699.24	705.36	707.16	718.76	719.88	722.76	1,154.88	1,436.88
Independent	Ray McKimm* †	10.47%	885	891.48	906.48	933.84	958.52	962.36	975.8	1,003.44	1,218.44
TUV	Peter Wilson	5.37%	454	454.36	463.48	492.88	505.36	552.2	712.52	713.52	729.52
Green (NI)	Stephen Dunlop*	6.90%	583	598.84	600.84	605.4	615.88	622.48	631.12	666	
Alliance	Alex Harbinson	4.56%	385	485.92	492.04	494.44	503.92	504.16	507.04		
DUP	Dean McSorley	4.27%	361	361.12	366.12	381.84	388.16				
UUP	Rachel McCord	3.70%	313	315.76	328.76	341.12					
NI Conservatives	Tim Mullen	1.02%	86	86.36							
Electorate: 19,376 Valid: 8,450 (43.61%) Spoilt: 105 Quota: 1,208 Turnout: 8,555 (44.15%)

== 2019 Election ==
2014: 2 x DUP, 2 x UUP, 1 x Alliance, 1 x Green

2019: 2 x DUP, 1 x Alliance, 1 x Green, 1 x UUP, 1 x Independent

2014-2019 Change: Independent gain from UUP

Bangor Central - 6 seats
Party	Candidate	FPv%	Count										
Party	Candidate	FPv%	1	2	3	4	5	6	7	8	9	10	11
Alliance	Karen Douglas*	18.29%	1,346										
Green (NI)	Stephen Dunlop	14.22%	1,046	1,220.9									
DUP	Alistair Cathcart*	10.70%	787	789.86	789.86	789.86	816.86	832.86	1,052.08				
UUP	Craig Blaney	10.29%	757	774.38	777.38	788.16	818.04	862.24	871.46	903.76	1,324.76		
DUP	Wesley Irvine* ‡	11.93%	878	879.1	879.1	880.42	915.42	926.42	956.64	966.08	1,047.84	1,191.84	
Independent	Ray McKimm	6.84%	503	517.08	526.74	553.36	572.36	603.46	608.46	783.76	827.98	903.98	933.98
Independent	Noelle Robinson*	5.75%	423	446.76	461.3	491.88	513.1	543.2	544.2	681.46	723.62	769.62	788.62
UUP	Ian Henry	7.37%	542	555.86	556.86	568.74	588.96	635.6	641.6	664.8			
Independent	Maria Lourenço	4.92%	362	389.6	392.5	441.78	454.32	472.2	473.42				
DUP	James Cochrane	3.47%	255	255.66	256.66	256.88	273.88	277.88					
NI Conservatives	Frank Shivers	2.85%	210	215.06	215.06	221.66	238.1						
UKIP	John Montgomery	2.92%	215	217.42	217.42	220.06							
Independent	Gavan Reynolds	0.45%	33	35.86									
Electorate: 18,166 Valid: 7,357 (40.50%) Spoilt: 93 Quota: 1,052 Turnout: 7,450 (41.01%)

== 2014 Election ==
2014: 2 x DUP, 2 x UUP, 1 x Alliance, 1 x Green

Bangor Central - 6 seats
Party	Candidate	FPv%	Count												
Party	Candidate	FPv%	1	2	3	4	5	6	7	8	9	10	11	12	13
DUP	Wesley Irvine*	9.81%	643	650	651	746	776	791	837	841	878	956			
Alliance	Stuart Anderson †	6.76%	443	454	478	482	485	509	510	831	875	892	892	990	
Green (NI)	Noelle Robinson ‡	7.57%	496	513	556	559	569	594	599	648	694	743	743.26	957.26	
UUP	Ian Henry*	8.98%	589	603	611	619	635	657	741	747	848	932	934.08	956.08	
UUP	Carl McClean	6.74%	442	470	477	487	500	517	545	551	607	692	693.56	789.56	809.56
DUP	Alistair Cathcart*	8.45%	554	556	560	584	589	606	642	643	664	721	725.16	754.16	757.16
DUP	Roberta Dunlop*	6.62%	434	440	443	477	495	515	543	548	612	656	665.36	705.36	710.36
Independent	Mary Macartney	6.79%	445	455	465	470	486	512	515	537	619	664	665.04		
UKIP	William Montgomery*	5.87%	385	400	408	412	434	450	561	565	591				
Independent	David Chambers	5.90%	387	406	411	420	429	501	508	525					
Alliance	Nicholas Fell	6.03%	395	399	433	435	436	449	451						
TUV	William Cudworth	4.58%	300	304	305	308	360	369							
Independent	Colin Breen	4.18%	274	281	293	295	301								
Community Partnership	Mark Gordon	3.39%	222	224	229	230									
DUP	Adam Harbinson*	3.10%	203	209	212										
NI21	Peter Floyd	2.65%	174	178											
NI Conservatives	David Symington	2.59%	170												
Electorate: 17,194 Valid: 6,556 (38.13%) Spoilt: 122 Quota: 937 Turnout: 6,678 (38.84%)
