= Comber (District Electoral Area) =

Electoral district in Northern Ireland

- Ards and North Down Borough Council DEA constituency

Current constituency
- Created: 2014
- Seats: 5 (2014–)
- Councillors: Rachel Ashe (APNI); Trevor Cummings (DUP); Libby Douglas (DUP); Patricia Morgan (APNI); Philip Smith (UUP)

Comber DEA within Ards and North Down

Comber is one of the seven district electoral areas (DEA) in Ards and North Down, Northern Ireland. The district elects five members to Ards and North Down Borough Council and contains the wards of Ballygowan, Comber North, Comber South, Comber West and Killinchy. Comber forms part of the Strangford constituencies for the Northern Ireland Assembly and UK Parliament.

It was created for the 2014 local elections, largely replacing the Ards West DEA, which had existed since 1985.

== Councillors ==
Election	Councillor (Party)	Councillor (Party)	Councillor (Party)	Councillor (Party)	Councillor (Party)
2023	Patricia Morgan (Alliance)	Rachel Ashe (Alliance)	Philip Smith (UUP)	Libby Douglas (DUP)	Trevor Cummings (DUP)
February 2023 Defection	Patricia Morgan (Alliance)	Stephen Cooper (TUV)/ (Independent)	Philip Smith (UUP)	Robert Gibson (DUP)	Trevor Cummings (DUP)
January 2023 Co-Option	Patricia Morgan (Alliance)	Stephen Cooper (TUV)/ (Independent)	Philip Smith (UUP)	Robert Gibson (DUP)	Trevor Cummings (DUP)
2019	Deborah Girvan (Alliance)	Stephen Cooper (TUV)/ (Independent)	Philip Smith (UUP)	Robert Gibson (DUP)	Trevor Cummings (DUP)
2014	Deborah Girvan (Alliance)	Stephen Cooper (TUV)/ (Independent)	James Fletcher (UUP)	Robert Gibson (DUP)	Trevor Cummings (DUP)

== 2023 Election ==
2019: 2 x DUP, 1 x Alliance, 1 x UUP, 1 x TUV

2023: 2 x DUP, 2 x Alliance, 1 x UUP

2019–2023 Change: Alliance gain from TUV

Comber - 5 seats
Party	Candidate	FPv%	Count				
Party	Candidate	FPv%	1	2	3	4	5
DUP	Libby Douglas	20.60%	1,501				
UUP	Philip Smith*	19.31%	1,407				
DUP	Trevor Cummings*	17.88%	1,303				
Alliance	Patricia Morgan*	14.84%	1,081	1,087.38	1,127.54	1,204.6	1,219.6
Alliance	Rachel Ashe	13.99%	1,019	1,032.64	1,074.72	1,160.8	1,215.2
TUV	Sam Patterson	5.61%	409	595.56	651.24	677.36	922.12
Independent	Stephen Cooper*	4.42%	322	374.14	399.58	452.36	
Green (NI)	Cory Quinn	2.72%	197	207.56	219.56		
Independent	John Sloan	0.58%	47	52.5	66.42		
Electorate: 15,112 Valid: 7,286 (48.21%) Spoilt: 95 Quota: 1,215 Turnout: 7,381 (48.84%)

== 2019 Election ==
2014: 2 x DUP, 1 x Alliance, 1 x UUP, 1 x TUV

2019: 2 x DUP, 1 x Alliance, 1 x UUP, 1 x TUV

2014-2019 Change: No change

Comber - 5 seats
Party	Candidate	FPv%	Count					
Party	Candidate	FPv%	1	2	3	4	5	6
Alliance	Deborah Girvan* †	23.23%	1,516					
UUP	Philip Smith	16.58%	1,082	1,178.3				
DUP	Trevor Cummings*	12.91%	843	856.8	895.5	901.8	1,298.8	
DUP	Robert Gibson*	15.09%	985	992.5	1,024.5	1,028.7	1,201.7	
TUV	Stephen Cooper* ‡	10.65%	695	716	819.3	828	887	1,065
Green (NI)	Ricky Bamford	5.70%	372	582.3	737.4	780.6	797.6	816.6
DUP	John Montgomery	9.85%	643	648.7	689.5	693.1		
UUP	Michael Palmer	4.87%	318	361.8				
Independent	John Sloan	1.12%	73	100				
Electorate: 14,244 Valid: 6,527 (45.82%) Spoilt: 60 Quota: 1,088 Turnout: 6,587 (46.24%)

== 2014 Election ==
2014: 2 x DUP, 1 x UUP, 1 x Alliance, 1 x TUV

Comber - 5 seats
Party	Candidate	FPv%	Count						
Party	Candidate	FPv%	1	2	3	4	5	6	7
DUP	Robert Gibson*	17.29%	1,071						
UUP	James Fletcher*	13.93%	863	878	880.61	974.67	1,037.67		
Alliance	Deborah Girvan*	13.16%	815	880	880.3	980.39	1,016.48	1,121.48	
DUP	Trevor Cummings*	11.54%	715	724	733.39	771.63	838.93	960.93	975.93
TUV	Stephen Cooper	9.32%	577	585	585.78	639.87	750.08	908.23	920.23
DUP	John Oswald*	10.33%	640	648	663.36	676.63	742.14	867.38	879.38
UUP	Philip Smith*	8.17%	506	526	526.42	588.48	661.6		
UKIP	Isabella Hanna	6.89%	427	439	440.65	477.71			
NI Conservatives	John Andrews	6.64%	411	425	425.93				
NI21	Margaret Howson	2.73%	169						
Electorate: 13,681 Valid: 6,194 (45.27%) Spoilt: 78 Quota: 1,033 Turnout: 6,272 (45.84%)
