= Young Greens (Ireland) =

Youth political organisation in Ireland

Young Greens Óige Ghlas
- Co-Chairperson: Adam Devine and Ash Jones
- Founded: March 2002
- Headquarters: 16–17 Suffolk Street, Dublin 2, Ireland
- Ideology: Green politics
- Mother party: Green Party
- European affiliation: Federation of Young European Greens
- International affiliation: Global Young Greens
- Website: younggreens.ie

Old logo of the Young Greens

Young Greens (Irish: Óige Ghlas) is a youth political organisation in Ireland that acts as the youth branch of the Green Party and the Green Party in Northern Ireland. As a youth party they focus on issues that affect young people including access to education, affordable housing, drug policy, LGBTQI+ rights and reproductive rights.The Young Greens believe in social and economic justice for all as well as environmental sustainability for the future.

== History ==
Óige Ghlas was formed in March 2002, as a group of students from the four main college campuses, which focused on the environment and social justice. It soon branched out to other college campuses and other themes, like opposition to the Iraq War and support for the Kyoto Protocol and Fairtrade. It campaigns for protection of the environment, human rights and more funding for education. Óige Ghlas conducts campaigns on local as well as national and European levels.

The membership of Óige Ghlas grew rapidly in the late 2010s as a result of the highly publicised environmental campaigns led by Greta Thunberg and Extinction Rebellion. This led to a bounce back by the Green Party in the 2019 local and European elections in which the party won 49 seats, up from 12 in the previous 2014 local election. Notably 6 of these 49 elected councillors were members of Óige Ghlas and ran as youth candidates. This was considered a part of the larger 'Green Wave' sweeping European politics at this time.

This momentum continued onto the 2020 general election where the Green Party increased its number of seats from 3 to 12 and were widely viewed, alongside Sinn Féin, as the 'winners' of the election. Shortly after the election results were announced and gave way to negotiations on government formation, COVID-19 arrived into Ireland and led to the first national lockdown. Government formation negotiations took place under intense public pressure to finalise an agreement so the next government could deal with the COVID-19 pandemic. Yet negotiations continued until an agreement to form the 32nd government of Ireland was announced on 27 June 2020.

Despite the success at the general election, the Green Party found itself dogged by infighting and resignations afterwards. The party was divided on going into government, as the younger and more progressive wing wanted to remain in opposition but the older, more established wing wanted to enter the coalition. At one point, Hollywood actor Mark Ruffalo took part in a webinar to convince younger members to support the coalition agreement. Many of the Young Greens were against going into government, believing that the social change and action on climate change that they campaigned for could not be delivered in coalition with Fianna Fáil and Fine Gael.

Prominent member Saoirse McHugh, a candidate in the 2019 European elections, 2020 general election and the 2020 Seanad election, resigned from the party upon the Greens entering government with Fine Gael and Fianna Fáil, parties she believed would damage public enthusiasm for environmentalist policies by pairing them with "socially regressive" policies. Before leaving the party, Saoirse and other prominent members who campaigned against going into government formed the 'Just Transition Greens', an affiliate group within the party with a green left/eco-socialist outlook, who have the objective of moving the party towards policies based on the concept of a "Just Transition".

Over the course of 2020, 4 councillors as well as both the leader of the Young Greens and the leader of the Queer Greens would also depart from the party, all citing either bullying within the party or dissatisfaction with the coalition and its policies as the cause. The Young Greens, along with the majority of their branches, and the Queer Greens, fell apart after these resignations. Amongst the resignations were councillors Lorna Bogue and Liam Sinclair, who subsequently formed a new left-wing green party called An Rabharta Glas – Green Left in June 2021.

The Trinity Young Greens managed to keep going through this period, however with a much reduced membership, and hosted a handful of activities. A skeleton committee revived the Young Greens in 2022, largely through attending activities with the support the Federation of Young European Greens, the European Green Party's youth wing. In January 2023, the Young Greens held their annual Convention, elected a new national executive committee and fully revived the group.

== Member groups ==
The Young Greens currently have member groups throughout Ireland, most of which operate within third level institutions. The member groups include;

- UCD Young Greens based in University College Dublin
- DCU Young Greens based in Dublin City University
- TUD Young Greens based in Technological University Dublin
- Galway Young Greens based in University of Galway
- Trinity Young Greens based in Trinity College, Dublin
- Young Greens of Northern Ireland, a regional group of the Young Greens based in Northern Ireland and affiliated to the Green Party of Northern Ireland.

== Organisation ==
The Young Greens operate as defined in "Young Greens – Óige Ghlas Constitution". The current constitution was adopted in 2017 and has last been amended in 2023.

Membership is open to students engaged in second or third-level education and all residents of Ireland between the ages of 16 and 30. The Young Greens operate autonomously of the Green Party and membership of the Young Greens does not confer Membership of the Green Party.

All Member Groups of the Young Greens meet at least once a year at the National Convention, it is here that the executive committee is elected, the annual budget is approved and the constitution is amended. The meeting place of the National Convention is rotated between Member Groups.

The Young Greens are run by an executive committee, elected annually at the National Convention. The Committee meets at least six times a year. Any Member Group not represented in any Executive Position may elect an Ordinary Member to the committee to act as a delegate with full voting rights. A member of the Young Greens Executive Committee is elected by the committee to be the representative of the Young Greens at the Green Party (Ireland) National Executive Committee.

The co-chairs of the executive committee act as the chief public representatives of the Young Greens.

== Elected Young Greens ==
Six Young Greens were elected as councillors in the 2019 Irish local elections. They are:

- Eva Dowling
- Lorna Bogue
- Lawrence Hemmings
- Séafra Ó Faoláin
- Una Power
- Daniel Whooley

Since then, Lawrence Hemmings and Séafra Ó Faoláin have resigned their seats and Lorna Bogue has resigned as a member of the party.
