= Kelly Andrews (politician) =

Politician from Northern Ireland

Kelly Andrews was the Co-Chair of the Green Party in Northern Ireland.

Andrews studied at Queen's University Belfast. After working in community development, Andrews joined the Green Party in 2003, and was elected Co-Chair in 2005. She also holds the title of National Coordinator for the Green Party Ireland, and runs the Green's constituency office in North Down. Andrews is additionally a member of the Parades Commission.

Party political offices
Preceded by Lindsay Whitcroft	Co-Chair of the Green Party in Northern Ireland with John Barry; 2005–2009	Succeeded by Karly Greene
