= Connie Egan =

Alliance Party of Northern Ireland MLA

Connie Egan MLA
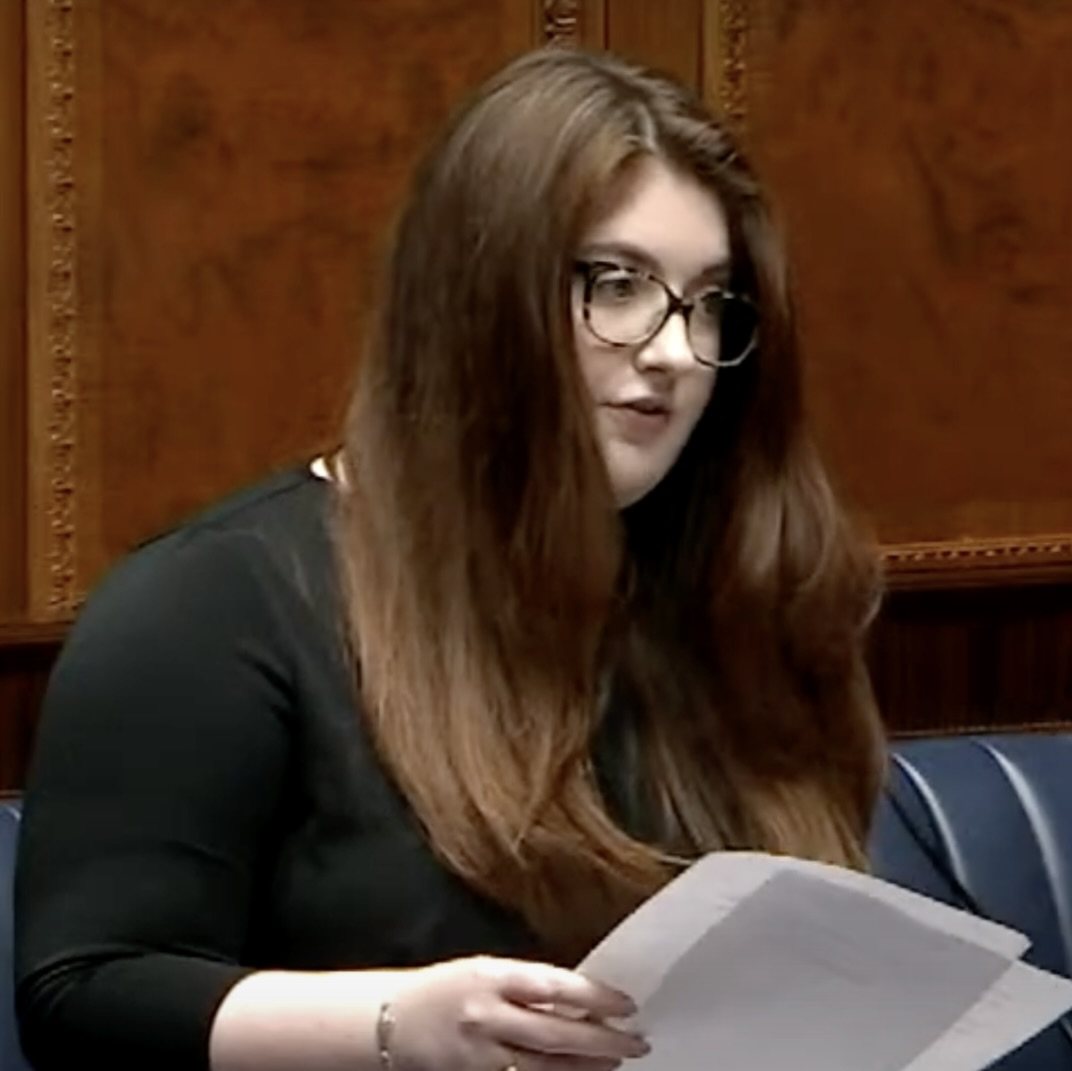

Member of the Northern Ireland Assembly for North Down
- Incumbent
- Assumed office 5 May 2022
- Preceded by: Rachel Woods

Member of Ards and North Down Borough Council
- In office 2 May 2019 – 7 May 2022
- Preceded by: Alan Graham
- Succeeded by: Hannah Irwin
- Constituency: Bangor West

Personal details
- Born: 21 December 1994 (age 31) Bangor, Northern Ireland
- Party: Alliance
- Spouse: Peter McCully (m. 2026)
- Occupation: Politician
- Website: Assembly profile

Connie Egan is a Northern Irish politician who is an Alliance Party Member of the Legislative Assembly (MLA). She was elected as an MLA in the 2022 Northern Ireland Assembly election for North Down.

== Political career ==
=== Early career (2019-2022) ===
Egan was elected as an Alliance Party Councillor for Bangor West DEA in Ards and North Down Borough Council in the 2019 local elections. She topped the poll with 20.16% of the vote and gained a seat at the expense of the DUP. She was the youngest woman elected ever to the council.

Previously, she was employed as Constituency and Research Officer to Chair of the Assembly Education Committee, Alliance MLA Chris Lyttle.

=== Member of the Legislative Assembly (2022-) ===
Connie Egan ran alongside Andrew Muir, who had been co-opted into the Assembly in December 2019 to replace Stephen Farry, as an Alliance candidate for the 2022 Assembly election in North Down. She polled 5,224 FPVs as Alliance increased their vote in the constituency by 10.3%. She was elected on the 9th stage, taking a seat from the Green Party's Rachel Woods. This, combined with the loss of Clare Bailey in Belfast South, left the Greens with no representation in the Assembly.

== Personal life ==
She is a member of Amnesty International and is a Governor of Trinity Nursery School Bangor.
