= John Barry (Green Party politician) =

Irish academic, green political economist and politician

Professor John Barry
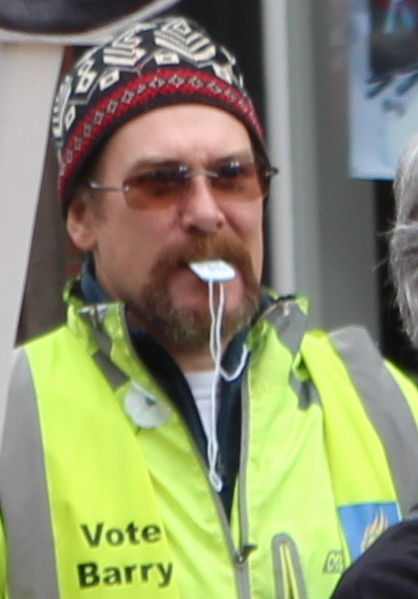

Member of Ards and North Down Borough Council
- In office 22 May 2014 – 15 March 2018
- Preceded by: Office established
- Succeeded by: Rachel Woods
- Constituency: Holywood and Clandeboye

Member of North Down Borough Council
- In office 27 July 2011 – 22 May 2014
- Preceded by: Steven Agnew
- Succeeded by: Council abolished
- Constituency: Abbey

Personal details
- Born: 6 December 1966 (age 59) Dublin, Republic of Ireland
- Party: Green Party
- Other political affiliations: Workers' Party (before 1992); Democratic Left (1992 - 1999)
- Education: University College Dublin (BA, MA); University of Glasgow (PhD)

Academic background
- Thesis: Green Political Theory: An Immanent Critique and Reconstruction
- Doctoral advisor: Chris Berry

Academic work
- Institutions: Keele University (1994-2000); Queen's University Belfast (2000-)
- Main interests: Sustainability; environmental politics; renewable energy transition; political economy; green politics; green republicanism; political theory

John Joseph Barry (born 6 December 1966) is an Irish academic, green political economist and former Green Party politician. He was a councillor on Ards and North Down Borough Council from May 2014 to March 2018.

He is a former co-chair of the party, having held the position from 2003 until standing down in April 2009.

== Personal life ==
Barry studied at University College Dublin. He moved to work as a lecturer at Keele University while undertaking postgraduate study at the University of Glasgow.

In 2000, he moved to work at Queen's University Belfast.

Barry was acting director of the Institute of Governance, Public Policy and Social Research at Queen's University Belfast and is currently Reader in Politics in the School of Politics, International Studies and Philosophy and assistant director of the Institute for a Sustainable World.

From January 2007 to June 2007, Barry was the "Benedict Distinguished Visiting Professor of Political Science" at Carleton College in Northfield, Minnesota.

He has written many books and academic articles on sustainable development, environmental policy and the economics of sustainability. He is co-editor of two academic journals, Environmental Politics and Ecopolitics Online.

== Political career ==
Barry's political life began in the Workers' Party and then Democratic Left.

By January 2003, he was elected as joint leader of the Green Party in Northern Ireland, alongside Kelly Andrews. He stood unsuccessfully in North Down at the 2003 Assembly election. He also stood in the Holywood ward for the local elections in 2005 and narrowly missed being elected by 60 votes.

He was a prime mover behind the creation of an all-island Green Party, officially launched in December 2006 in advance of the 2007 NI Assembly elections, which saw the Greens get their first Assembly seat in North Down with Brian Wilson.

Party political offices
Preceded by ?	Co-Chair of the Green Party in Northern Ireland with Lindsay Whitcroft 2004–2005; Kelly Andrews 2005–2009; 2003–2009	Succeeded by Mark Bailey
