= Steven Agnew =

Northern Irish politician

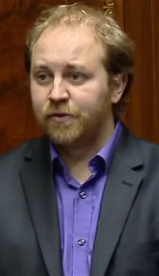
- Agnew speaking in the Northern Ireland Assembly, January 2016

Leader of the Green Party in Northern Ireland
- In office 10 January 2011 – 21 November 2018
- Deputy: Clare Bailey; Tanya Jones
- Preceded by: Office created
- Succeeded by: Clare Bailey

Member of the Legislative Assembly for North Down
- In office 6 May 2011 – 24 September 2019
- Preceded by: Brian Wilson
- Succeeded by: Rachel Woods

Member of North Down Borough Council
- In office 5 May 2011 – 27 July 2011
- Preceded by: Roberta Dunlop
- Succeeded by: John Barry
- Constituency: Abbey

Personal details
- Born: 12 October 1979 (age 46) Dundonald, Northern Ireland
- Party: Green Party (2003 - 2019)
- Education: Queen's University Belfast
- Occupation: Activist, politician

Steven Agnew (born 12 October 1979) is a Northern Irish Environmental Director and former politician who served as the leader of the Green Party in Northern Ireland between 2011 and 2018, and was a Member of the Legislative Assembly (MLA) for North Down from 2011 to 2019.

== Early life ==
Agnew was born in Dundonald and studied at Brooklands Primary School, Grosvenor Grammar School and Queen's University Belfast. Sammy Wilson and Michelle McIlveen were teachers at his school. He grew up around a "very negative political landscape", where politics was "about being anti-Catholic, anti the Pope and anti-Sinn Féin."

== Political career ==
Agnew joined the Green Party in 2003 during its campaign against the invasion of Iraq. During a protest march from Queen's to the US Consulate, he met John Barry, who convinced him that "the Green Party had a practical agenda of what needed to be changed". He came to believe "environmental justice is interlinked" with social justice.

At the 2007 Northern Ireland Assembly election, he stood in Belfast East, where he took 2.2% of the vote and was not elected. Brian Wilson was successful for the party at the election, and Agnew became his full-time research officer. He was the party's candidate for the 2009 European Parliament election in the Northern Ireland constituency, where he increased the party's share to 3.3%, although he still came bottom of the poll. At the 2010 United Kingdom general election, he stood in North Down, taking 3.1% of the votes cast. He increased this to 5.4% in 2015 and 6.5% in 2017.

In January 2011, Agnew was elected as the first leader of the Green Party, beating Cadogan Enright in a postal ballot. He successfully contested the North Down seat in the 2011 Northern Ireland Assembly election.

Agnew announced he would step down as the Green Party NI leader from Autumn 2018, citing family reasons. He resigned as an MLA in September 2019 to become head of the Northern Ireland Renewables Industry Group representing the renewable electricity industry in Northern Ireland.

Northern Ireland Assembly
Preceded by Brian Wilson	MLA for North Down; 2011–2019	Succeeded by Rachel Woods
