= Kate Nicholl =

Northern Irish politician (born 1988)

Kate Nicholl MLA
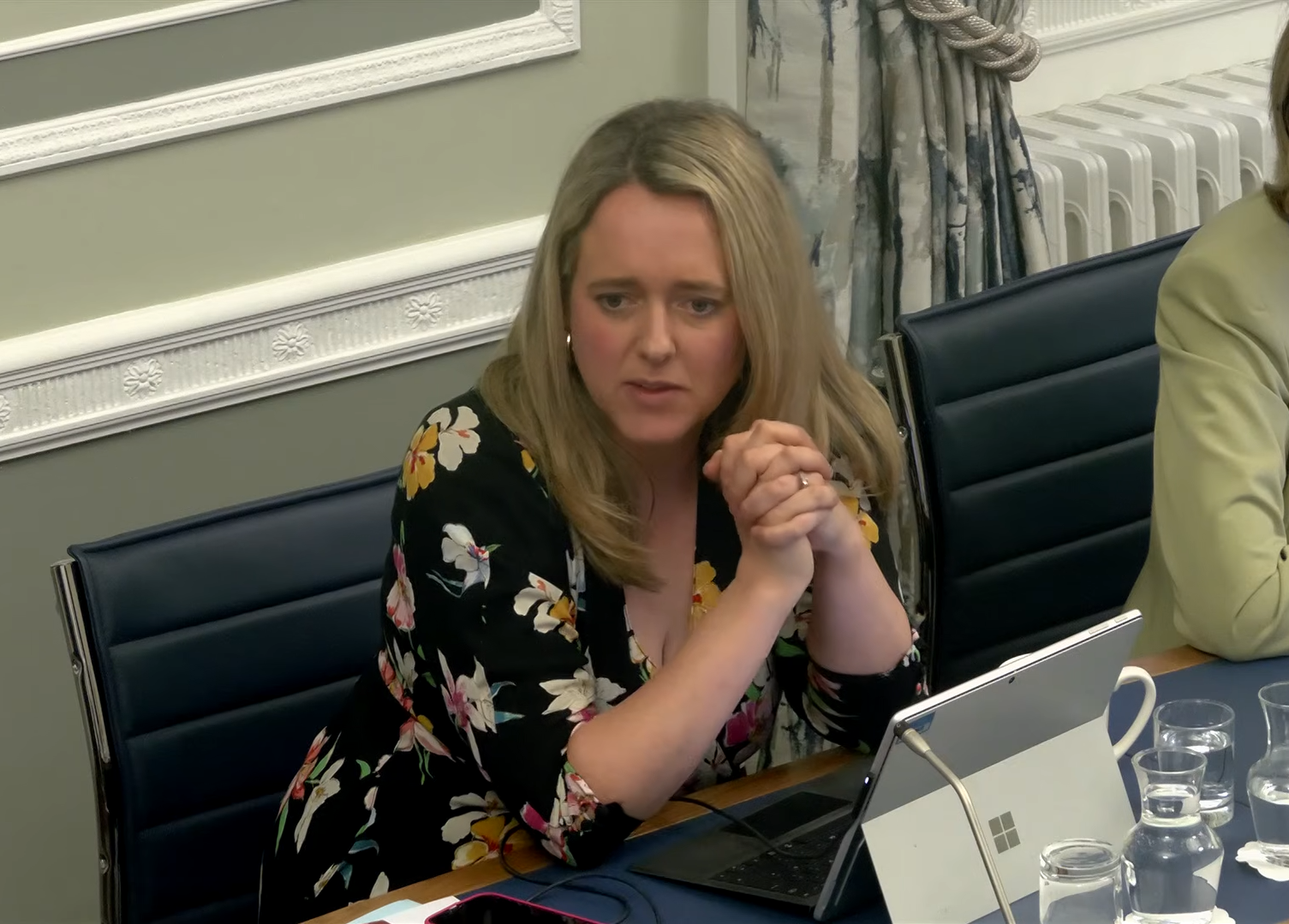

Member of the Northern Ireland Assembly for Belfast South
- Incumbent
- Assumed office 5 May 2022
- Preceded by: Clare Bailey

79th Lord Mayor of Belfast
- In office 1 June 2021 – 7 May 2022
- Deputy: Tom Haire
- Preceded by: Frank McCoubrey
- Succeeded by: Michael Long

Member of Belfast City Council
- In office 3 June 2016 – 7 May 2022
- Preceded by: Paula Bradshaw
- Succeeded by: Micky Murray
- Constituency: Balmoral

Personal details
- Born: Kate Siobhan Nicholl; 4 May 1988 (age 38) Marondera, Zimbabwe
- Party: Alliance
- Spouse: Fergal Sherry (m. 2018)
- Children: 3
- Education: Methodist College Belfast
- Alma mater: University College London (BSc); Ulster University (MSc)
- Occupation: Politician
- Website: Official website Assembly profile

Kate Siobhan Nicholl (born 4 May 1988) is a Zimbabwean-Northern Irish politician for the Alliance Party, serving as a Member of the Legislative Assembly (MLA) for Belfast South since 2022.

Before her election to the assembly, Nicholl was the 79th Lord Mayor of Belfast, having been elected in June 2021. She was the first Lord Mayor in recent history not to be born in the United Kingdom or Republic of Ireland.

Nicholl was an unsuccessful candidate in the 2024 Alliance Party deputy leadership election.

== Early life ==
Nicholl was born in Marondera, Zimbabwe. Her father comes from County Down and her mother Helen comes from South Africa, where her family was involved in anti-Apartheid activism. They left Zimbabwe in 2000 when Kate was 12 after violence broke out, moving to Belfast. She studied at Methodist College Belfast, and worked as an advisor to the Alliance Party's Anna Lo.

== Political career ==
=== Early career (2014–2021) ===
Nicholl ran as one of two Alliance Party candidates, alongside Andrew Muir, for the constituency of Holywood and Clandeboye in the North Down and Ards Borough Council, as a part of the 2014 local elections. She placed sixth; missing out on the fifth seat by just under 200 votes to the DUP's Jennifer Gilmore.

On 3 June 2016, Nicholl was co-opted onto Belfast City Council to fill the vacant position left after Paula Bradshaw of the Alliance Party was elected to the Northern Ireland Assembly in May 2016 to represent Belfast South. In May 2019, she was elected outright, topping the poll in the Balmoral constituency.

=== Lord Mayor of Belfast (2021–22) ===
She was sworn in as 79th Lord Mayor of Belfast on 1 June 2021, succeeding the Democratic Unionist Party's Frank McCoubrey. The theme for Nicholl's year as Lord Mayor was 'Our Belfast'. One of her first policies on becoming Lord Mayor was to focus on the health and well-being of children and brought the views of young people into meetings, though mental and wider physical health formed no part of her or the Council's responsibilities.

Nicholl claimed that being a non-native of Northern Ireland was a positive personal attribute as it gave her an outsider view on events. In interviews she acknowledged the differences and conflict in Belfast, but hoped she would be able to unite people, saying "how the city – all of it – is ours". As Lord Mayor, Nicholl was sexually harassed on social media over her condemnation of sexism and abuse on the Internet. She said that Alliance Party leader Naomi Long had faced similar harassment.

In December 2021, Nicholl publicly stated her support for the legalisation of cannabis, as well as the introduction of supervised injection sites in Belfast.

Nicholl was chosen as one of two Alliance candidates for Belfast South at the 2022 Northern Ireland Assembly election, alongside Paula Bradshaw.

The remaining three weeks of Nicholl's term as Lord Mayor was filled by Michael Long, the husband of Alliance Party leader Naomi Long. Long's three-week term as Lord Mayor was the shortest term of office for any Lord Mayor of Belfast and was also the first time that the spouse of a former Lord Mayor has held the post.

=== Member of the Legislative Assembly (2022–) ===
On 7 May 2022, Nicholl was the final candidate to be elected for Belfast South, edging out incumbent Green Party MLA Clare Bailey. She is the first Zimbabwe-born MLA in Northern Ireland. Upon her return to work soon after her daughter's birth, Nicholl highlighted that "support simply doesn't exist for women MLAs with babies and young children" as MLAs have no option for paid maternity leave like MPs do.

She has been an advocate for migrants and asylum seekers, and has been reported as "one of the best liked MLAs in Stormont across the parties."

Nicholl ran in Belfast South and Mid Down at the 2024 general election, coming second to the SDLP's Claire Hanna, increasing Alliance's share by 4.9% to 8,839 votes (20.3%).

== Personal life ==
Nicholl is married and has one son and a daughter. She gave birth to a son on 17 November 2019. On 30 May 2022, Nicholl gave birth to a daughter named Étaín Evelyn Sherry. She was named after Nicholl's grandmother Evelyn, who was involved in anti-apartheid activism as a member of the Black Sash in South Africa. On 4 April 2025 she gave birth to a baby boy.
