= Rachel Woods =

Northern Irish academic and Green Party politician

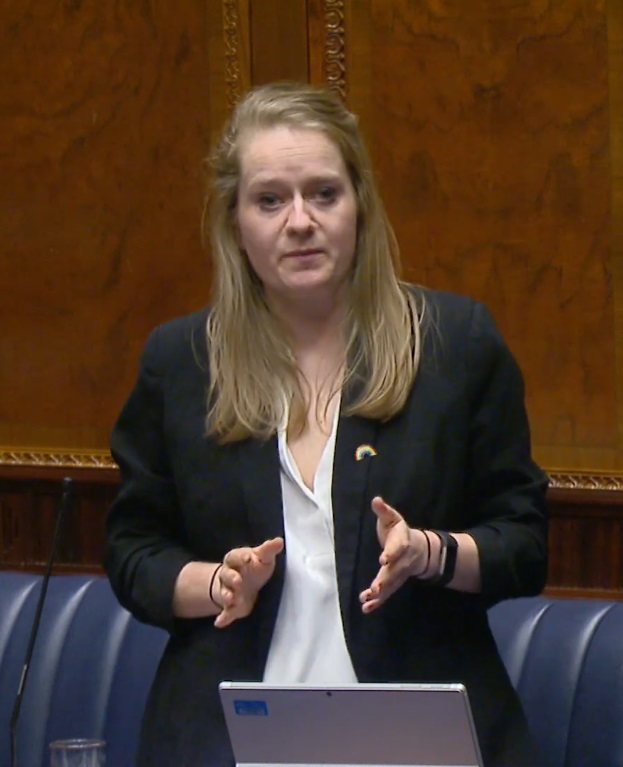
- Woods in 2021

Member of Ards and North Down Borough Council
- In office 22 September 2022 – 23 October 2023
- Preceded by: Lauren Kendall
- Succeeded by: Lauren Kendall
- Constituency: Holywood and Clandeboye
- In office 15 March 2018 – 11 October 2019
- Preceded by: John Barry
- Succeeded by: Kathryn McNickle
- Constituency: Holywood and Clandeboye
- In office 24 October 2016 – 15 March 2018
- Preceded by: Paul Roberts
- Succeeded by: James Hunter
- Constituency: Bangor West

Member of the Legislative Assembly for North Down
- In office 7 October 2019 – 28 March 2022
- Preceded by: Steven Agnew
- Succeeded by: Connie Egan

Personal details
- Born: 15 April 1989 (age 37) Belfast, Northern Ireland
- Party: Green Party
- Education: Queen's University Belfast (BA, MA)

Rachel Woods (born 15 April 1989) is a Northern Irish academic and former Green Party politician who served as a Member of the Legislative Assembly (MLA) for North Down from 2019 to 2022.

== Early life ==
Woods is from Holywood, County Down. She holds a degree in history and a master's from Queen's University Belfast. From the age of 15, Woods worked in hospitality as a cleaner, chef and bar worker. She also worked as a researcher and economic analyst for Analyse Africa, part of the Financial Times, and as a supervisor in Holywood bar The Dirty Duck Ale House.

== Political career ==
Woods joined the Green Party because she was "fed up screaming at the TV, fed up with politicians in my area who were supposed to represent me and who just didn't."

Woods was co-opted onto Ards and North Down Borough Council in October 2016, replacing Paul Roberts, in the Bangor West District. She was moved to the Holywood and Clandeboye District in March 2018, and retained the Green Party seat there at the local elections in 2019.

In October 2019, Woods was co-opted to the Northern Ireland Assembly as a representative for North Down, succeeding former party leader, Steven Agnew.

Woods passed many amendments to the Domestic Abuse Bill, including widening access to legal aid for victims of abuse and changes to the “child aggravator” clause providing for tougher custodial sentences where a child could be impacted by abuse, as well as additional reporting requirements.

In 2022, her Safe Leave Bill passed the Assembly, making Northern Ireland the first region of the UK to provide 10 days paid leave to victims of domestic abuse. Upon passage, the Bill was said to be "a life saver for many people who are experiencing or have experienced domestic abuse."

She has called for votes at 16 in Northern Ireland elections and has been prominent in calls for the Northern Ireland local government pension scheme to divest from fossil fuels. In March 2022, the pension scheme moved £2.8 billion of its funds into low-carbon investments.

She lost her North Down seat in the 2022 Northern Ireland Assembly election to Connie Egan of the Alliance Party.

Woods was co-opted back onto Ards and North Down Borough Council in September 2022, representing Holywood and Clandeboye again. She retained her seat at the 2023 election, though would resign from the Council in October that same year.

Northern Ireland Assembly
Preceded by Steven Agnew	MLA for North Down; 2019–2022	Succeeded by Connie Egan
