= Clare Bailey =

Northern Irish politician

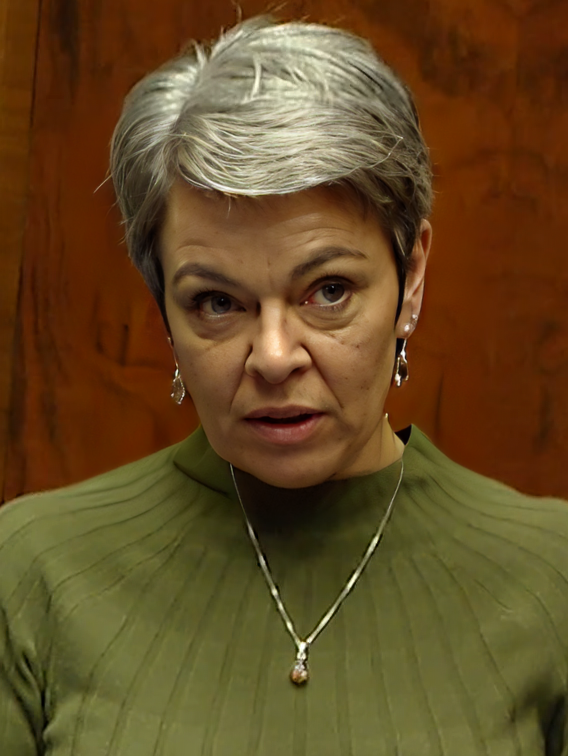
- Bailey in 2020

Leader of Green Party Northern Ireland
- In office 21 November 2018 – 15 August 2022
- Deputy: Mal O'Hara
- Preceded by: Steven Agnew
- Succeeded by: Mal O'Hara

Deputy Leader of Green Party Northern Ireland
- In office November 2014 – 1 October 2017
- Leader: Steven Agnew
- Preceded by: Office created
- Succeeded by: Tanya Jones

Member of the Legislative Assembly for Belfast South
- In office 5 May 2016 – 28 March 2022
- Preceded by: Fearghal McKinney
- Succeeded by: Kate Nicholl

Personal details
- Born: 18 June 1970 (age 56) Clonard, Belfast, Northern Ireland
- Party: Green Party
- Children: 2
- Education: Queen's University Belfast

Clare Bailey (born 18 June 1970) is a Northern Irish activist and former politician who was the Leader of Green Party Northern Ireland from November 2018 to August 2022, having been deputy leader of the party from 2014 to 2017. Bailey was a Member of the Legislative Assembly (MLA) for Belfast South from 2016 to 2022.

== Early life ==
Bailey was born in Clonard on the Lower Falls. She was one of the first 28 pupils of Lagan College, Northern Ireland's first integrated school. She later attended Queen's University Belfast.

== Political career ==
Bailey identifies as pro-choice and a feminist. She was a client escort for women accessing healthcare advice at the Belfast Marie Stopes Clinic, enduring assault and intimidation from anti-abortion protesters. She has also worked supporting survivors of sexual violence and abuse.

In 2011 she stood unsuccessfully for the Laganbank district electoral area on Belfast City Council, narrowly missing a seat and coming 6th in a 5-seat district electoral area.

Bailey was elected as an MLA in Belfast South at the 2016 Assembly election. She nearly trebled the Green Party vote in the area compared to the previous Assembly election. Political commentators considered her election so unlikely that pundit Alex Kane said he would sing on the steps of the Assembly if Bailey was elected. Kane kept this promise and was filmed by the BBC doing so.

Bailey was re-elected to the Assembly in 2017.

She served as the Greens' Deputy Leader until 2017. In November 2018, Bailey became Leader of the Green Party.

In May 2019, Bailey ran unsuccessfully for European Parliament, receiving 12,471 votes which placed her 7th and increased the Greens' share of the vote by 0.48%. In December 2019, she pulled out of the Westminster election to back Claire Hanna of the SDLP who she described as the "pro-Remain" candidate.

In March 2022, Bailey secured cross-party support and successfully passed a bill through the Assembly creating 'safe zones' around abortion clinics to prevent the harassment of women. Bailey also proposed her own Climate Change Bill, and ultimately succeeded in strengthening Minister Edwin Poots' eventual Climate Change Bill. Bailey said that Poots' Bill "simply wouldn’t be in place" if it wasn't for the Green Party proposing a climate bill in the first place.

Speaking ahead of the 2022 Northern Ireland Assembly election, Bailey highlighted the Green Party's outsized influence in the Assembly by noting that the Greens' policies, previously dismissed by rival parties, were now appearing in their manifestos. In the election, she lost her seat to Lord Mayor of Belfast Kate Nicholl of the Alliance Party.

After the 2022 Northern Ireland Assembly election, Bailey chose not to stand for re-election as leader. She was succeeded by Mal O'Hara in August 2022.

Ahead of the 2024 Westminster elections she signed the nomination papers of Claire Hanna of the SDLP, choosing not to endorse her former party colleague Cllr Áine Groogan.

Northern Ireland Assembly
Preceded by Fearghal McKinney	MLA for Belfast South; 2016–2022	Succeeded by Kate Nicholl
Party political offices
New title	Deputy Leader of the Green Party in Northern Ireland; 2014–2017	Succeeded by Tanya Jones
