= Stephen Dunne (politician) =

Northern Ireland politician (born 1988/89)

Stephen Dunne MLA
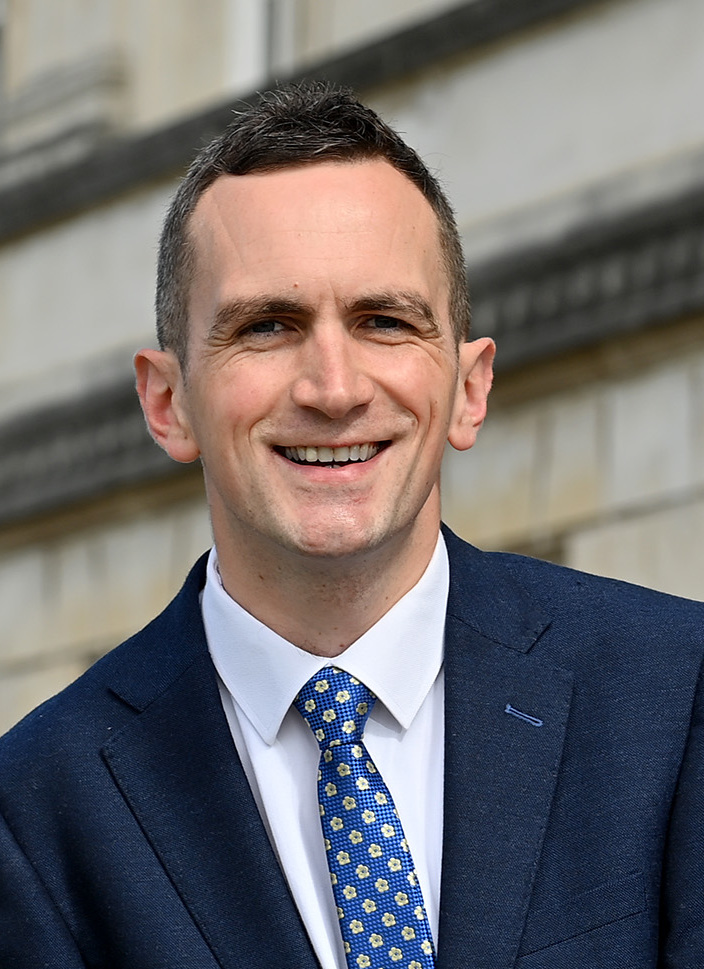
- Stephen Dunne in 2021

Member of the Legislative Assembly for North Down
- Incumbent
- Assumed office June 2021
- Preceded by: Gordon Dunne

Member of Ards and North Down Borough Council
- In office 22 May 2014 – June 2021
- Preceded by: Council created
- Succeeded by: Peter Johnson
- Constituency: Holywood and Clandeboye

Personal details
- Born: 1988/89 County Down, Northern Ireland
- Party: Democratic Unionist
- Parent: Gordon Dunne (father)

Stephen Dunne (born 1988/89) is a Democratic Unionist Party (DUP) politician, serving as a Member of the Northern Ireland Assembly (MLA) for North Down since June 2021. Additionally, Dunne is the party's Spokesperson for Sports.

== Political career ==
Dunne started serving on the Ards and North Down Borough Council in 2013; he was re-elected in 2014 and 2019.

Dunne was co-opted to the Northern Ireland Assembly in 2021 representing North Down to replace his father Gordon Dunne, who had resigned due to ill health shortly before his death.

Northern Ireland Assembly
Preceded by Gordon Dunne	MLA for North Down; 2021–present	Incumbent
