= Green Party Northern Ireland =

Political party in Northern Ireland

- Leader: Mal O'Hara
- Deputy Leader: Lesley Veronica
- Founded: May 1983; 43 years ago (as the Northern Ireland Ecology Party); 12 February 1990; 36 years ago (as the Green Party)
- Preceded by: Ecology Party
- Headquarters: Bangor
- Youth wing: Young Greens
- LGBT wing: Queer Greens
- Membership (2020): c. 700–800
- Ideology: Green politics Nonsectarianism
- European affiliation: European Green Party
- European Parliament group: Greens–European Free Alliance
- International affiliation: Global Greens
- Republic affiliate: Green Party (Ireland)
- Colours: Green and blue
- House of Commons (NI Seats): 0 / 18
- NI Assembly: 0 / 90
- NI Local Councils: 5 / 462

Website
- www.greenpartyni.org

The Green Party Northern Ireland, sometimes abbreviated as Green Party NI, is a political party in Northern Ireland. Like many green political parties around the world, its origins lie in the anti-nuclear, labour and peace movements of the 1970s and early 1980s.

Since 2006, the party has operated as a region of the Green Party of Ireland and also maintains links with other Green parties, including the Scottish Greens and the Green Party of England and Wales. The party has a youth wing operating as the Young Greens. The party also has pro-LGBTQ rights policies and an activist group specifically for those policies, the Queer Greens.

== History ==
In the Northern Ireland local elections of May 1981, Peter Emerson, Avril McCandless and Malcolm Samuels stood as the first candidates to use the Ecology label in Northern Ireland and gained 202, 81 and 61 votes respectively; the first in a large urban area, the other two in smaller rural constituencies. Emerson had previously stood in the same area in 1977.

In May 1983, the Northern Ireland Ecology Party was launched at a press conference held in the Europa Hotel, Belfast, with members of the British and Irish Ecology parties in attendance.

The modern incarnation of the Green Party of Northern Ireland was founded by Peter Doran on 12 February 1990.

The party became a region of the Green Party of Ireland in 2006.

In 2007, a Green society was established at Queen's University Belfast. In 2010, the LGBT Greens NI were established: a policy group and lobby group specialising in LGBT community issues within Northern Ireland. The LGBT group dissolved in early 2012 as their main aim—pushing for the inclusion of same-sex marriage within party policy—was achieved at the 2011 AGM after a unanimous vote.

The party supported a no vote in the 2011 Alternative Vote referendum. In February 2015, the Queer Greens party group was set up to become the LGBT issues and activist wing of the party. The group is taking charge of party policy on LGBT rights, issues, welfare, campaigning, lobbying and raising awareness.

On 14 January 2016, the party announced that it had selected Ellen Murray as its candidate to contest the 2016 Northern Ireland Assembly elections for West Belfast, making her the first openly transgender person to stand for election on the island of Ireland.

In June 2023, the party got their first ever mayoral role when Áine Groogan was made the deputy lord mayor of Belfast.

== Policies ==
The Green Party has four key values: social justice, environmental sustainability, grassroots democracy and non-violence. It is considered to be more to the left than most parties in Northern Ireland.

The Green Party has been involved in several major campaigns since entering the Northern Ireland Assembly, including clean rivers and anti-nuclear campaigns, opposition to fracking, and fighting the austerity agenda. It has also campaigned against the development of incinerators at Belfast North Foreshore and Lough Neagh, and against proposals to extend the airport runway at George Best Belfast City Airport.

The party has advocated for electoral reform, such as the adoption of proportional representation in general elections, abolishing the House of Lords, and the extension of voting rights to 16-year-olds.

The Green Party campaigns not just for more environmental protection but also for politics for the common good. Former leader Steven Agnew has championed the rights of children in Northern Ireland through his Private Member's Bill which is seeking to establish a statutory duties on government departments to work together to deliver optimum children's services. Agnew has also been a long-standing supporter of integrated education and a society based on equal rights and mutual respect for all traditions. This has included bringing forward the first motion on same-sex marriage to the Northern Ireland Assembly in 2011. The party has also called for funding to be focused on improving public transport infrastructure and supports the creation of an independent environmental protection agency for Northern Ireland. They also campaign for a shift to alternative energy for Northern Ireland and were involved in the setting up of a lobby group for the sector. The Green Party in Northern Ireland campaigns for transparency in political funding, responsive local government, effective community planning, dynamic and sustainable local economies, environmental protection, and for animal welfare.

On the constitutional status of Northern Ireland, Agnew believes the status quo should remain "until the people of Northern Ireland decide otherwise", but stated that the Green Party does not consider the issue as one that should divide its members or society. The party has also called for greater transparency in politics, arguing that political donations in Northern Ireland should be made public. Northern Ireland is the only region of the United Kingdom where political donations are secret.

The party has said it wants a citizens' assembly to examine if drugs should be decriminalised to reduce deaths. In March 2021, then deputy leader and now leader of the party since August 2022, Mal O'Hara, said legalisation and harm-reduction models should be considered as the "current approach is obviously not working". In 2020, drug deaths in Northern Ireland were recorded at 218 according to official figures. This was an increase from the official recorded figure in 2019, which stood at 191 drug deaths in Northern Ireland and 92 in 2010, indicating the figure had more than doubled in a decade.

== Leaders ==
- Steven Agnew (10 January 2011 – 21 November 2018)
- Clare Bailey (21 November 2018 – 15 August 2022)
- Mal O'Hara (15 August 2022 – present)

== Election results ==
The party's first electoral success in Northern Ireland was at the local council elections of 2005. Raymond Blaney was elected onto Down District Council and Brian Wilson, formerly of the Alliance Party, took a seat on North Down Borough Council. The party's third local councillor was Ciaran Mussen, elected to Newry and Mourne District Council.

At the 2007 Northern Ireland Assembly election, the Green Party won its first seat in the Northern Ireland Assembly, when Brian Wilson won a seat in the North Down constituency. Overall the party won 11,985 first preference votes or 1.7% of the total – a rise of 1.4% since the 2003 Assembly election.

In 2009, the Green Party stood Steven Agnew in the European election — he secured 15,674 votes, trebling the Green Party's share of the vote. The Greens fought the election on the Green New Deal, calling for job creation in the green energy sector.

The Greens fielded four candidates in the 2010 UK general election, none of which managed to secure a seat. However, the number of votes for Green candidates more than trebled.

Brian Wilson MLA stood down ahead of the 2011 Assembly election, in which the party won a seat on North Down council, with their candidate Steven Agnew. Agnew subsequently stepped down from his position on North Down Borough Council as the party took a strong stand against so called 'double jobbing' or dual mandate; he was replaced by John Barry.

In May 2016, the Greens picked up their second seat in the Northern Ireland Assembly when Clare Bailey took a seat in South Belfast. In 2019, the Greens picked up seats in local elections across the country. They managed to double the seats and won four seats in Belfast City Council.

Bailey and Rachel Woods were both defeated in the 2022 Northern Ireland Assembly election, leaving the party with no representation in Stormont for the first time since 2007.

=== Northern Ireland Assembly elections ===
Election	Body	Seats won	±	Position	First pref. votes	%	Government	Leader
1996	Forum	0 / 110	Steady	None	3,647	0.5%	Extra-parliamentary	None
1998	Assembly	0 / 108	Steady	None	710	0.1%	Extra-parliamentary	None
2003	Assembly	0 / 108	Steady	None	2,688	0.4%	Extra-parliamentary	None
2007	Assembly	1 / 108	▲1	▲6th	11,985	1.7%	Opposition	Kelly Andrews and John Barry
2011	Assembly	1 / 108	Steady	6th	6,031	0.9%	Opposition	Steven Agnew
2016	Assembly	2 / 108	▲1	6th	18,718	2.7%	Opposition	Steven Agnew
2017	Assembly	2 / 90	Steady	6th	18,527	2.3%	Opposition	Steven Agnew
2022	Assembly	0 / 90	▼2	▼7th	16,433	1.9%	Extra-parliamentary	Clare Bailey

=== UK Parliament elections ===
Election	Seats (in NI)	±	Position	Total votes	% (in NI)	% (in UK)	Government
1983	0 / 18	Steady	None	451	0.1%	0.0%	Extra-parliamentary
1987	0 / 17	Steady	None	281	0.0%	0.0%	Extra-parliamentary
1997	0 / 18	Steady	None	539	0.1%	0.0%	Extra-parliamentary
2010	0 / 18	Steady	None	3,542	0.5%	0.0%	Extra-parliamentary
2015	0 / 18	Steady	None	6,822	1.0%	0.0%	Extra-parliamentary
2017	0 / 18	Steady	None	7,452	0.9%	0.0%	Extra-parliamentary
2019	0 / 18	Steady	None	1,996	0.2%	0.0%	Extra-parliamentary
2024	0 / 18	Steady	None	8,692	1.1%	0.0%	Extra-parliamentary

==== 1983 general election ====
Constituency	Candidate	Votes	%	Position
North Antrim	Malcolm Samuel	451	1.0	6

==== 1987 general election ====
Constituency	Candidate	Votes	%	Position
East Londonderry	Malcolm Samuel	281	0.6	6

==== By-elections, 1987–1992 ====
By-election	Candidate	Votes	%	Position
Upper Bann	Peter Doran	576	1.6	9

==== 1997 general election ====
Constituency	Candidate	Votes	%	Position
Belfast North	Peter Emerson	539	1.3	5

==== 2010 general election ====
Constituency	Candidate	Votes	%	Position
Belfast South	Adam McGibbon	1,036	3.0	5
North Down	Steven Agnew	1,043	3.1	5
South Down	Cadogan Enright	901	2.1	6
Strangford	Barbara Haig	562	1.7	7

==== 2015 general election ====
Constituency	Candidate	Votes	%	Position
Belfast East	Ross Brown	1,058	2.7	4
Belfast South	Clare Bailey	2,238	5.7	6
Fermanagh and South Tyrone	Tanya Jones	788	1.5	4
North Down	Steven Agnew	1,958	5.4	4
West Tyrone	Ciaran McClean	780	2.0	6

==== 2017 general election ====
Constituency	Candidate	Votes	%	Position
Belfast East	Georgina Milne	561	1.3	5
Belfast North	Mal O'Hara	644	1.4	5
Belfast South	Clare Bailey	2,241	5.1	5
Fermanagh and South Tyrone	Tanya Jones	423	0.8	5
North Down	Steven Agnew	2,549	6.5	4
Strangford	Ricky Bamford	607	1.6	6
West Tyrone	Ciaran McClean	427	1.0	6

==== 2019 general election ====
Constituency	Candidate	Votes	%	Position
East Antrim	Philip Randle	685	1.8	7
Strangford	Maurice Macartney	790	2.1	6
West Tyrone	Susan Glass	521	1.3	7

==== 2024 general election ====
Constituency	Candidate	Votes	%	Position
Belfast East	Brian Smyth	1,077	2.5	5
Belfast North	Mal O'Hara	1,206	3	6
Belfast South and Mid Down	Áine Groogan	1,577	3.6	6
Belfast West	Ash Jones	451	1.1	9
East Antrim	Mark Bailey	568	1.4	7
East Londonderry	Jen McCahon	445	1.1	8
Lagan Valley	Patricia Denvir	433	0.9	6
North Down	Barry McKee	1,247	2.9	4
South Antrim	Lesley Veronica	541	1.3	6
South Down	Declan Walsh	444	1	8
Strangford	Alexandra Braidner	703	1.8	7

=== Northern Ireland local elections ===
Election	±	Seats won	First-pref. votes	%
1985as Ecology	Steady	0	387	0.1
1989	Steady	0	329	0.1
1993	Steady	0	1,257	0.2
1997	Steady	0	706	0.1
2005	▲3	3	5,703	0.8
2011	Steady	3	6,317	1.0
2014	▲1	4	5,515	0.8
2019	▲4	8	14,284	2.1
2023	▼3	5	12,692	1.7

=== European Parliament elections ===
Election	Candidate	Seats won	Position	First pref. votes	%
1984as Ecology	Colin McGuigan	none	8th	2,236	0.3
1989	Malcolm Samuel	none	7th	6,569	1.2
2004	Lindsay Whitcroft	none	7th	4,810	0.9
2009	Steven Agnew	none	7th	15,764	3.3
2014	Ross Brown	none	8th	10,598	1.7
2019	Clare Bailey	none	7th	12,471	2.2

== Officers ==
The Green Party's Chairperson is Elaine Crory and the Secretary is Mark Bailey. The party treasurer is Patricia Denvir.

The Party has spokespeople in the following areas:

- North Down: Barry McKee
- South Belfast: Áine Groogan
- Bangor Central: Gillian McNaull
- Bangor West: Barry McKee
- Holywood & Clandeboye: Lauren Kendall
- East Belfast: Anthony Flynn
- North Belfast: Mal O'Hara
- Young Greens: Ashley Jones
- Queer Greens: Anthony Flynn

== Elected representatives ==
=== Local councils ===
- Lauren Kendall, Holywood and Clandeboye, Ards & North Down Council
- Barry McKee, Bangor West, Ards & North Down Council
- Anthony Flynn, Ormiston, Belfast City Council
- Brian Smyth, Lisnasharragh, Belfast City Council
- Áine Groogan, Botanic, Belfast City Council

== See also ==
- Demography and politics of Northern Ireland
- Green party
- Green politics
- List of environmental organisations
