= Committee for the Executive Office =

The Committee for the Executive Office was established to advise and assist the First Minister and deputy First Minister (currently Michelle O'Neill and Emma Little-Pengelly), on matters within their responsibilities as Ministers. The committee undertakes a scrutiny, policy development and consultation role with respect to the Executive Office and plays a key role in the consideration and development of legislation.

The Assembly approved a motion on 12 June 2007 to change the name of the committee from Committee of the Centre to Committee for the Office of the First Minister and deputy First Minister. Following the renaming of departments in the Northern Ireland Executive in 2016, the Assembly committee was renamed as the Committee for the Executive Office, reflecting the new name of the former Office of the First Minister and deputy First Minister.

== Membership ==
Membership of the committee is as follows:

Party	Member	Constituency
Alliance	Paula Bradshaw MLA (Chairperson)	Belfast South
Alliance	Stewart Dickson MLA (Deputy Chairperson)	East Antrim
DUP	Phillip Brett MLA	Belfast North
DUP	Deborah Erskine MLA	Fermanagh & South Tyrone
TUV	Timothy Gaston MLA	North Antrim
SDLP	Sinéad McLaughlin MLA	Foyle
Sinn Féin	Áine Murphy MLA	Fermanagh and South Tyrone
Sinn Féin	Carál Ní Chuilín MLA	Belfast North
Ind. Unionist	Claire Sugden MLA	East Londonderry

== 2022–2027 Assembly ==
Party	Member	Constituency
Alliance	Paula Bradshaw MLA (Chairperson)	Belfast South
Alliance	Connie Egan MLA (Deputy Chairperson)	North Down
Sinn Féin	Pádraig Delargy MLA	Foyle
DUP	Harry Harvey MLA	Strangford
DUP	Brian Kingston MLA	Belfast North
SDLP	Sinéad McLaughlin MLA	Foyle
Sinn Féin	Carál Ní Chuilín MLA	Belfast North
Sinn Féin	Emma Sheerin MLA	Mid Ulster
Ind. Unionist	Claire Sugden MLA	East Londonderry

=== Changes 2022–2027 ===
Date	Outgoing member and party	Constituency	→	New member and party	Constituency
9 October 2024	Pádraig Delargy MLA (Sinn Féin)	Foyle	→	Timothy Gaston MLA (TUV)	North Antrim
8 November 2024	Connie Egan MLA (Deputy Chairperson, Alliance)	North Down	→	Stewart Dickson MLA (Deputy Chairperson, Alliance)	East Antrim
10 February 2025	Emma Sheerin MLA (Sinn Féin)	Mid Ulster	→	Carál Ní Chuilín MLA (Sinn Féin)	Belfast North
23 September 2025	Harry Harvey MLA (DUP)	Strangford	→	Phillip Brett MLA (DUP)	Belfast North
23 September 2025	Brian Kingston MLA (DUP)	Belfast North	→	Pam Cameron MLA (DUP)	South Antrim

== 2017-2022 Assembly ==
The committee met for the first time in the 2017–2022 Assembly on 20 January 2020.

Party	Member	Constituency
SDLP	Colin McGrath MLA (Chairperson)	South Down
UUP	Mike Nesbitt MLA (Deputy Chairperson)	Strangford
DUP	Trevor Clarke MLA	South Antrim
Alliance	Trevor Lunn MLA	Lagan Valley
Sinn Féin	Fra McCann MLA	Belfast West
DUP	George Robinson MLA	East Londonderry
Sinn Féin	Pat Sheehan MLA	Belfast West
Sinn Féin	Emma Sheerin MLA	Mid Ulster
DUP	Christopher Stalford MLA	Belfast South

=== Changes 2017–2022 ===
Date	Outgoing member and party	Constituency	→	New member and party	Constituency
9 March 2020	Fra McCann MLA (Sinn Féin)	Belfast West	→	Martina Anderson MLA (Sinn Féin)	Foyle
4 May 2020	Mike Nesbitt MLA (Deputy Chairperson, UUP)	Strangford	→	Doug Beattie MLA (Deputy Chairperson, UUP)	Upper Bann
1 July 2021	Doug Beattie MLA (Deputy Chairperson, UUP)	Upper Bann	→	John Stewart MLA (Deputy Chairperson, UUP)	East Antrim
18 June 2021	Trevor Clarke MLA (DUP)	South Antrim	→	Diane Dodds MLA (DUP)	Upper Bann
13 September 2021	Martina Anderson MLA (Sinn Féin)	Foyle	→	Vacant	
27 September 2021	Vacant		→	Pádraig Delargy MLA (Sinn Féin)	Foyle
24 September 2021	George Robinson MLA (DUP)	East Londonderry	→	Alex Easton MLA (Independent Unionist)	North Down
18 October 2021	Colin McGrath MLA (Chairperson, SDLP)	South Down	→	Sinéad McLaughlin MLA (Chairperson, SDLP)	Foyle

== 2016-2017 Assembly ==
The committee met for the first time in the 2016–2017 Assembly on 31 May 2016.

Party	Member	Constituency
UUP	Mike Nesbitt MLA (Chairperson)	Strangford
UUP	Danny Kennedy MLA (Deputy Chairperson)	Newry and Armagh
Sinn Féin	Cathal Boylan MLA	Newry and Armagh
DUP	Pam Cameron MLA	South Antrim
Alliance	Stewart Dickson MLA	East Antrim
DUP	William Irwin MLA	Newry and Armagh
DUP	Phillip Logan MLA	North Antrim
Sinn Féin	Seán Lynch MLA	Fermanagh and South Tyrone
SDLP	Richie McPhillips MLA	Fermanagh and South Tyrone
Sinn Féin	Ian Milne MLA	Mid Ulster
DUP	Christopher Stalford MLA	Belfast South

=== Changes 2016–2017 ===
Date	Outgoing member and party	Constituency	→	New member and party	Constituency
12 September 2016	Ian Milne MLA (Sinn Féin)	Mid Ulster	→	Philip McGuigan MLA (Sinn Féin)	North Antrim

== See also ==
- Executive Office
- First Minister and deputy First Minister
