= 2022 Northern Ireland Assembly election =

- 5 May 2022

All 90 seats to the Northern Ireland Assembly
- Opinion polls
- Registered: 1,373,731
- Turnout: 63.61% (▼1.2%)
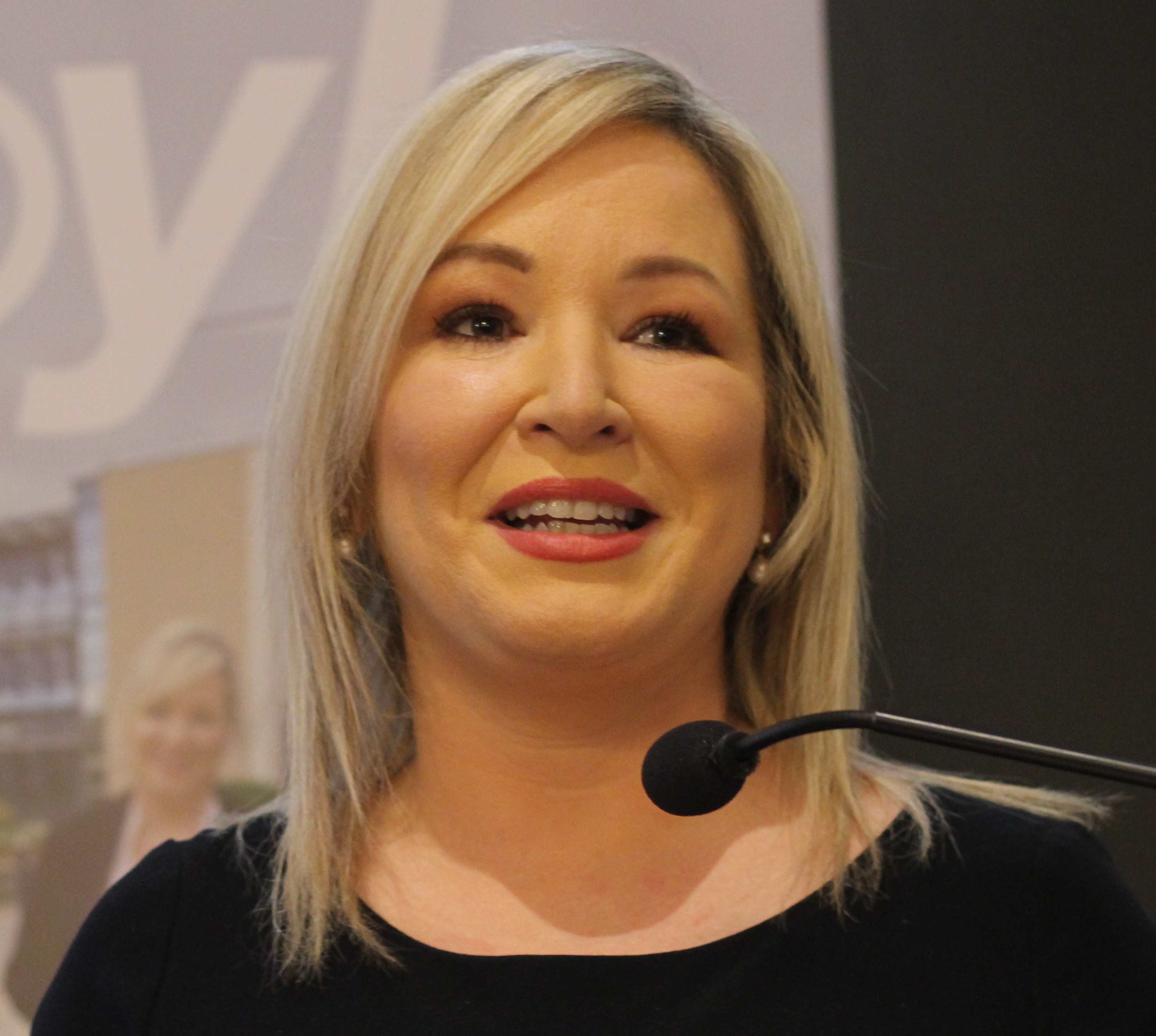

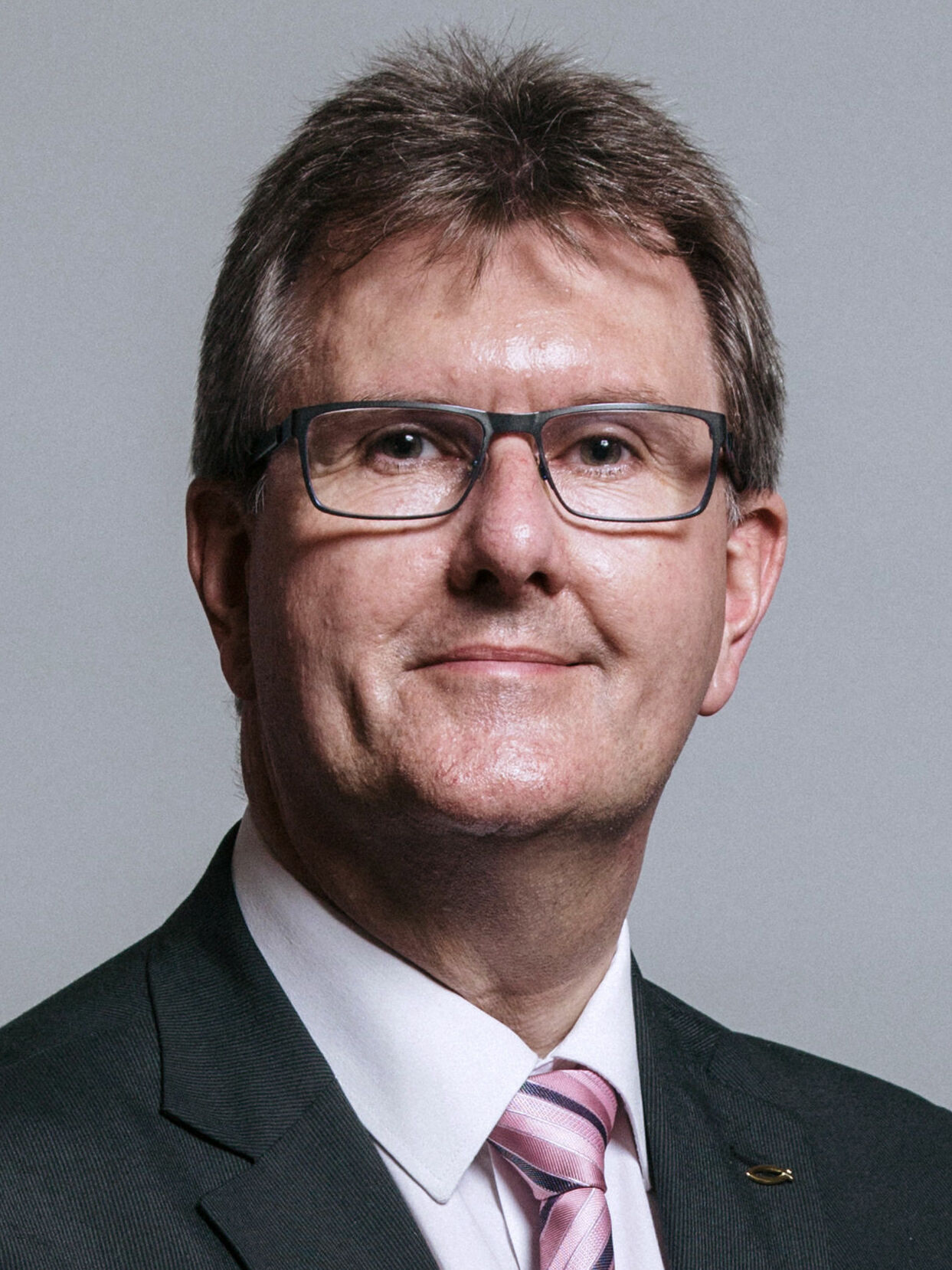

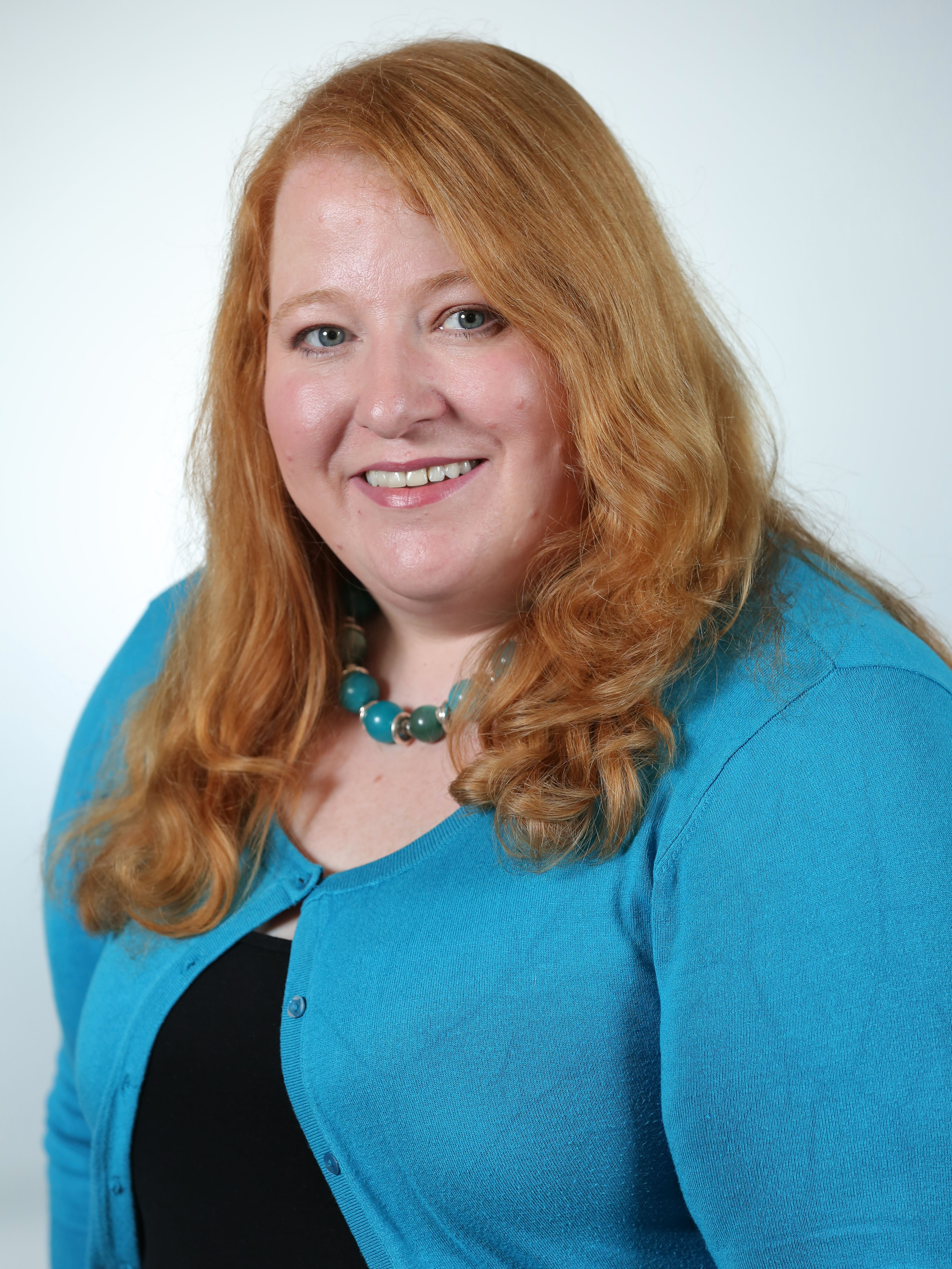

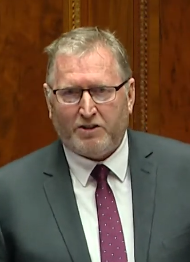

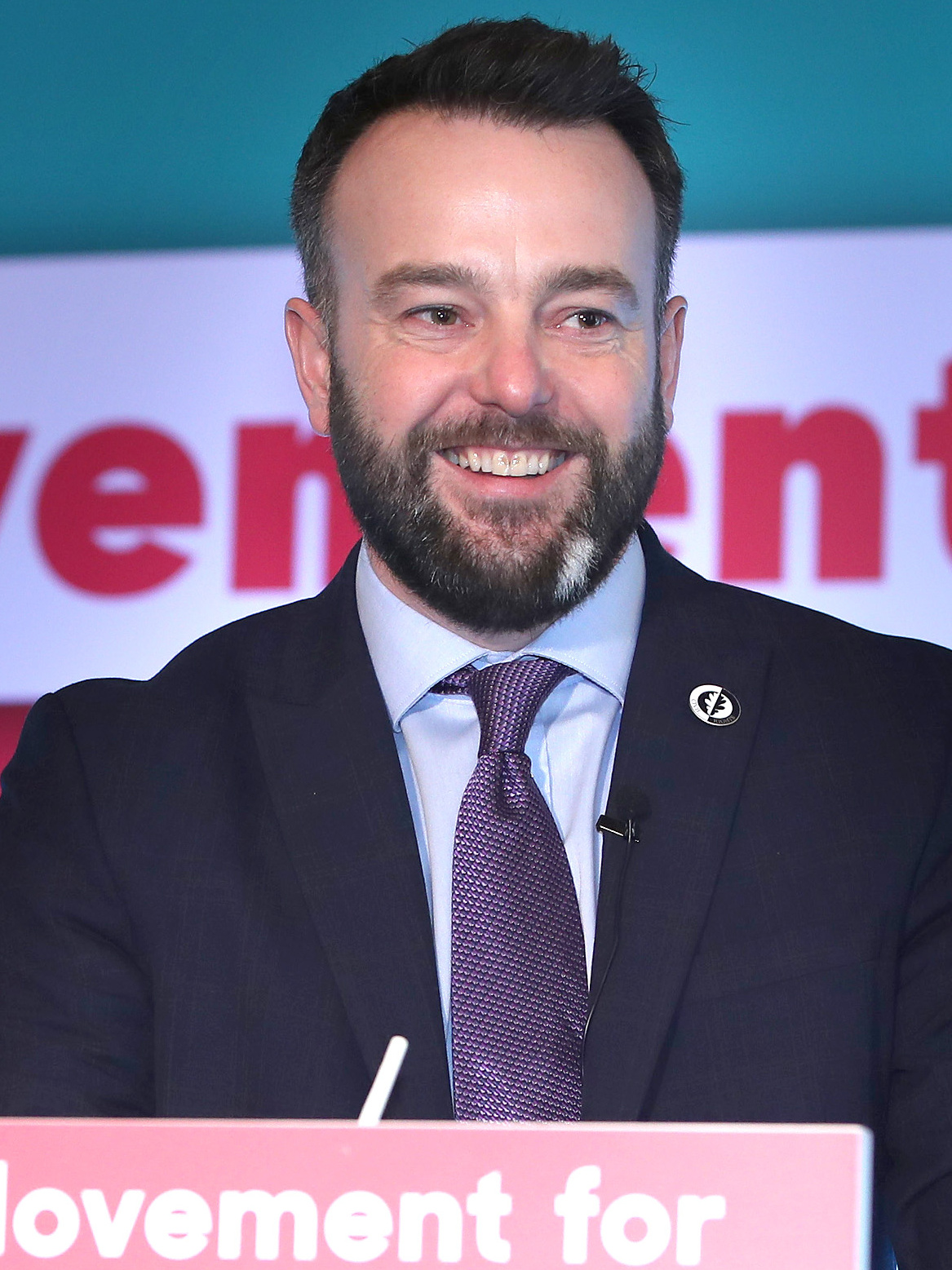

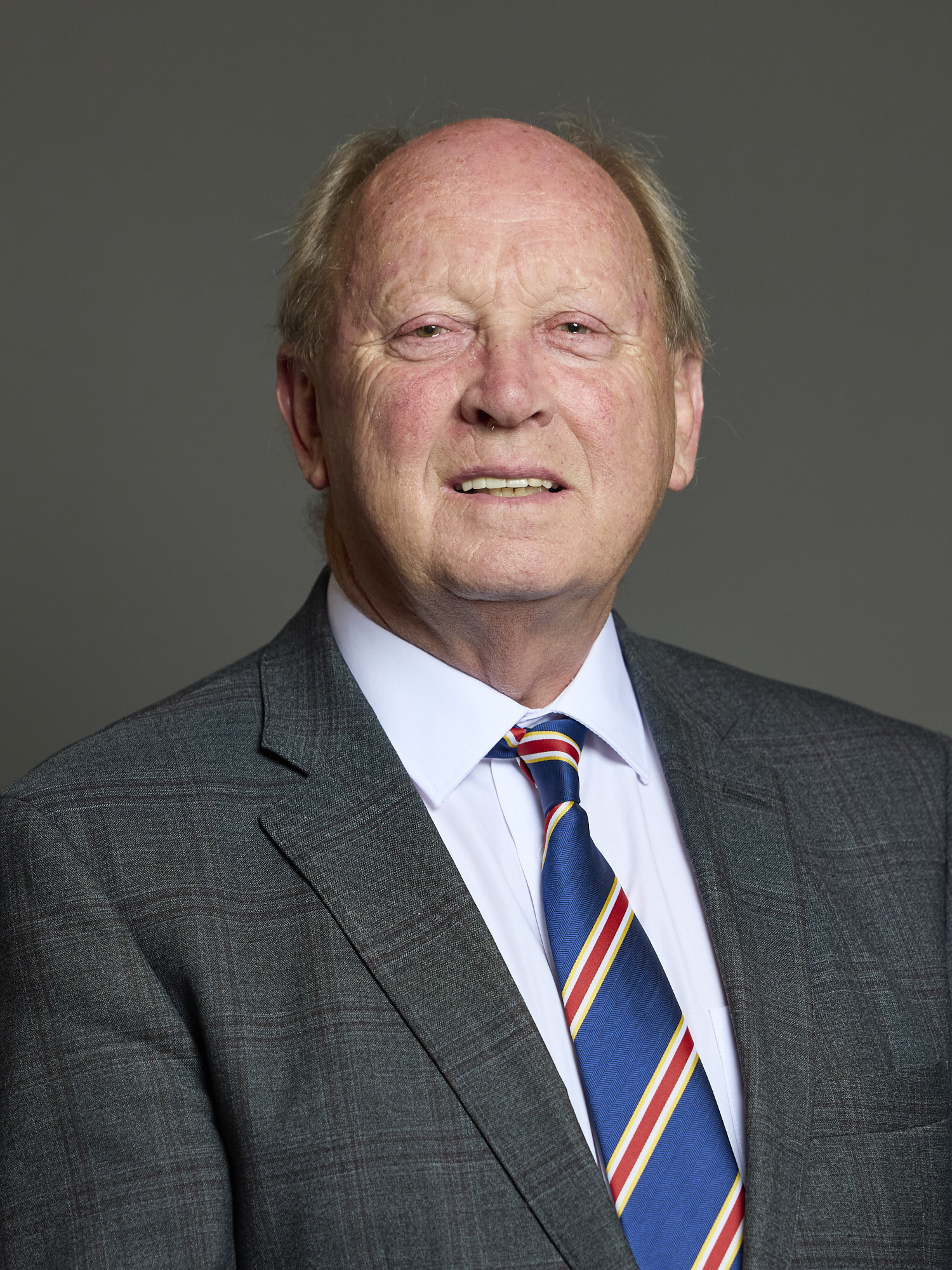

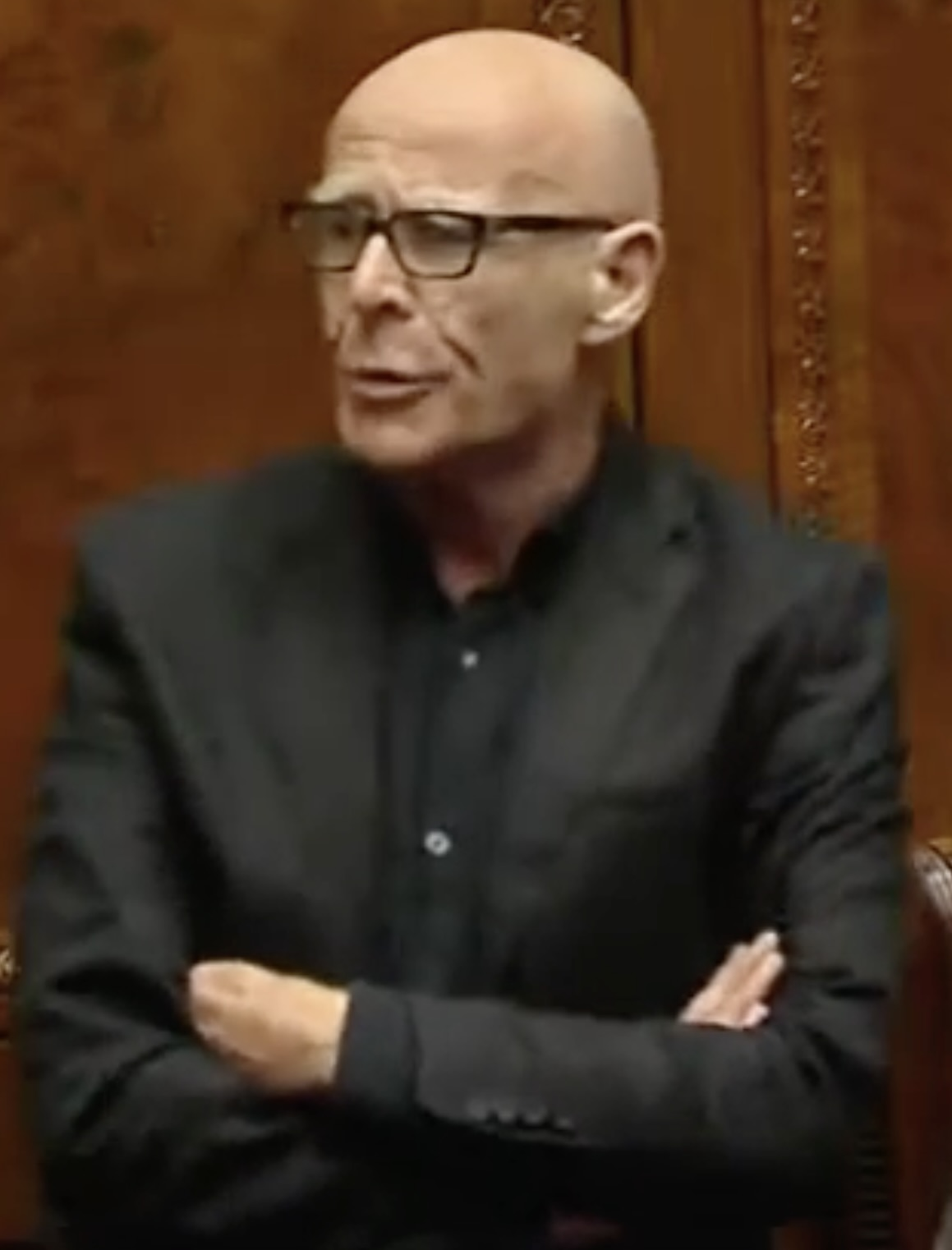

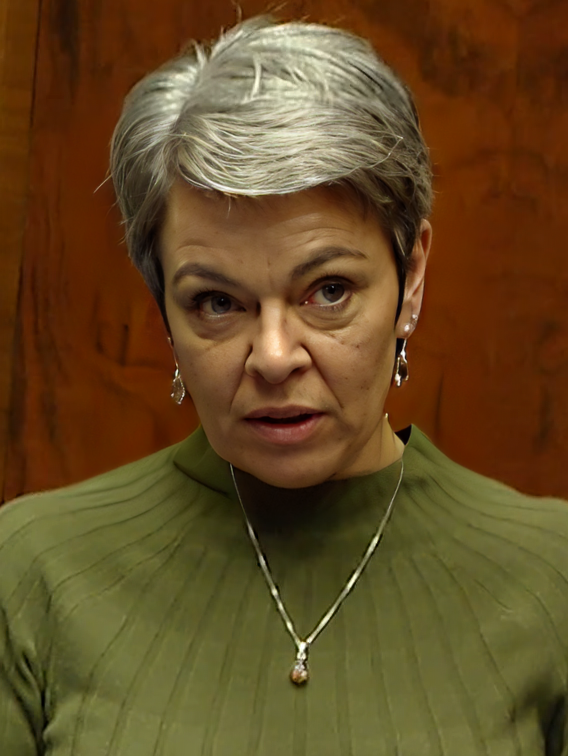
	First party	Second party	Third party
Leader	Michelle O'Neill (Note: O'Neill is the "Party leader in the North" and vice president. Sinn Féin's president is Mary Lou McDonald, who sits in the Dáil Éireann and serves as Leader of the Opposition in the neighbouring Republic of Ireland.)	Jeffrey Donaldson	Naomi Long
Party	Sinn Féin	DUP	Alliance
Leader since	23 January 2017 (Note: As "Party leader in the North")	30 June 2021	26 October 2016
Leader's seat	Mid Ulster	Lagan Valley (resigned) (Note: Donaldson was elected to the Assembly but declined to take up his seat as he sat in the House of Commons for the Westminster constituency of the same name. Emma Little-Pengelly was co-opted to the seat in his place.)	Belfast East
Last election	27 seats, 27.9%	28 seats, 28.1%	8 seats, 9.1%
Seats before	26	26	7
Seats won	27	25	17
Seat change	Steady	▼3	▲9
Popular vote	250,388	184,002	116,681
Percentage	29.0%	21.3%	13.5%
Swing	▲1.1%	▼6.7%	▲4.5%
	Fourth party	Fifth party	Sixth party
Leader	Doug Beattie	Colum Eastwood	Jim Allister
Party	UUP	SDLP	TUV
Leader since	17 May 2021	14 November 2015	7 December 2007
Leader's seat	Upper Bann	Did not stand (Note: Eastwood sits in the House of Commons as the MP for Foyle)	North Antrim
Last election	10 seats, 12.9%	12 seats, 11.9%	1 seat, 2.6%
Seats before	10	12	1
Seats won	9	8	1
Seat change	▼1	▼4	Steady
Popular vote	96,390	78,237	65,788
Percentage	11.2%	9.1%	7.6%
Swing	▼1.7%	▼2.9%	▲5.0%
	Seventh party	Eighth party
Leader	Eamonn McCann (Note: People Before Profit has a collective leadership, but for the purposes of registration to the UK Electoral Commission, Eamonn McCann is registered as the party's leader in Northern Ireland.)	Clare Bailey
Party	People Before Profit	Green Party (NI)
Leader since	N/A	21 November 2018
Leader's seat	Did not stand	Belfast South (lost seat)
Last election	1 seat, 1.8%	2 seats, 2.3%
Seats before	1	2
Seats won	1	0
Seat change	Steady	▼2
Popular vote	9,798	16,433
Percentage	1.1%	1.9%
Swing	▼0.6%	▼0.4%
First Minister and
deputy First Minister before election
Vacant
First Minister and deputy First Minister after election
Michelle O'Neill (SF) &
Emma Little-Pengelly (DUP) (Note: Office vacant until 3 February 2024.)

An election for the Northern Ireland Assembly was held on 5 May 2022. It elected 90 members. It was the seventh assembly election since the establishment of the assembly in 1998. The election was held three months after the Northern Ireland Executive collapsed due to the resignation of the First Minister, Paul Givan of the Democratic Unionist Party (DUP), in protest against the Northern Ireland Protocol.

In the sixth assembly, elected in 2017, eight parties had Members of the Legislative Assembly (MLAs): the DUP, latterly led by Jeffrey Donaldson; Sinn Féin, led by Michelle O'Neill; the Ulster Unionist Party (UUP), latterly led by Doug Beattie; the Social Democratic and Labour Party (SDLP), led by Colum Eastwood; Alliance, led by Naomi Long; the Greens, led by Clare Bailey; People Before Profit (PBP), which has a collective leadership; and the Traditional Unionist Voice (TUV), led by Jim Allister.

Sinn Féin became the largest party, marking the first time an Irish nationalist/republican party won the most seats in an assembly election in Northern Ireland, and has the right to nominate Northern Ireland's first nationalist First Minister. The DUP's vote share dropped almost 7% and it lost three seats; despite this, unionists won two more seats than nationalists—37 seats to 35—and a marginally higher share of the vote. Alliance made large gains, as the only party to gain seats at the election, overtaking the UUP and the SDLP to become the third-largest party in the Assembly. The Greens lost both seats they held before the election and were unrepresented in the Assembly for the first time since 2003.

As Northern Ireland's government is based on power-sharing, the DUP (the largest unionist party) was required to nominate a deputy First Minister for the Executive to be formed and the Assembly to conduct business; however, they refused to do so due to their opposition to the Northern Ireland Protocol and post-Brexit trading arrangements. It wasn't until 31 January 2024 that the DUP and UK Government announced a deal had been struck to revive the Executive, and on 3 February 2024 the Assembly swore in Sinn Féin First Minister Michelle O'Neill and DUP deputy First Minister Emma Little-Pengelly.

== Background ==
=== Electoral events ===
In May 2013, Theresa Villiers, Secretary of State for Northern Ireland, announced that the next Assembly election would be postponed to May 2016, and would be held at fixed intervals of five years thereafter. Section 7 of the Northern Ireland (Miscellaneous Provisions) Act 2014 specifies that elections will be held on the first Thursday in May on the fifth calendar year following that in which its predecessor was elected, which would be 5 May 2022; however, there are several circumstances in which the Assembly can be dissolved before the date scheduled by virtue of section 31(1) of the Northern Ireland Act 1998.

In June 2016, the UK voted to leave the European Union, although Northern Ireland voted to remain. The process of withdrawal held particular uncertainty for Northern Ireland due to the potential for customs on the UK–Ireland border. Meanwhile, an early election was held to the Northern Ireland Assembly in March 2017. After the election, Sinn Féin stated that it would not return to a power-sharing arrangement with the Democratic Unionist Party without significant changes in the party's approach, including Arlene Foster not becoming First Minister until an investigation into the Renewable Heat Incentive scandal was complete. Over the next few years, the deadline to form an executive was repeatedly extended as negotiations continued with no success.

On 18 April 2017, Theresa May, Prime Minister of the UK, called for a general election to be held on 8 June 2017. The Conservative Party lost its parliamentary majority and sought a confidence and supply agreement with the DUP in order to remain in government. The DUP and the Conservatives reached an agreement on 26 June.

In 2019, the UK experienced significant political turbulence over the question of how to proceed with Brexit. The European Parliament election in May 2019 saw the Alliance Party take the third MEP place from the Ulster Unionist Party (UUP). DUP support for the Conservative government broke down with disagreements over the government's Brexit plans. The Conservative government sought a new election, held in December 2019, which they won with a large majority. In Northern Ireland, for the first time, traditional Irish nationalist parties won more seats than traditional unionist parties. The SDLP and Alliance returned to the House of Commons, while the DUP and Sinn Féin saw vote share declines of more than 5%.

A DUP/Sinn Féin executive was re-established on 10 January 2020 with the New Decade, New Approach (NDNA) agreement, forestalling an immediate new election. By the end of February 2020, the COVID-19 pandemic was confirmed to have spread to Northern Ireland.

On 15 January 2022, the UK government was accused of interfering in the election by reintroducing dual mandates, which had been abolished in 2016. This would enable MPs like Donaldson to have seats in Stormont as well as Westminster, but plans were withdrawn four days later.

=== Leadership changes ===
On 28 April 2021, Arlene Foster announced that she would be resigning as DUP leader on 28 May and First Minister in June 2021 after more than 20 DUP MLAs and four DUP MPs signed a letter "...voicing no confidence in her leadership". Edwin Poots narrowly won the subsequent May 2021 DUP leadership election, but announced his resignation 21 days later. The runner-up in the election, Jeffrey Donaldson, stood unopposed in the June 2021 DUP leadership election and with no other candidates the party chose not to hold a ballot (some parties still do a leadership vote or ballot with one candidate with the other option to re-open nominations). Donaldson was ratified as the party's leader on 30 June 2021. Meanwhile, after Poots elected not to replace Foster as First Minister, Paul Givan took up the position on 17 June 2021.

Steve Aiken announced his resignation as leader of the UUP on 8 May 2021, with Doug Beattie taking up the post nine days later after standing unopposed.

=== Northern Ireland Protocol ===
The Northern Ireland Protocol is a protocol to the Brexit Withdrawal Agreement that governs the unique customs and immigration issues at the border on the island of Ireland between the United Kingdom and the European Union, and on some aspects of trade in goods between Northern Ireland and the rest of the United Kingdom. Its terms were negotiated in 2019 and agreed and concluded in December 2020. Due to a thirty-year internecine conflict in Northern Ireland known as The Troubles, the UK–Ireland border has had a special status since that conflict was ended by the Belfast Agreement/Good Friday Agreement of 1998. As part of the Northern Ireland Peace Process, the border has been largely invisible, without any physical barrier or customs checks on its many crossing points; this arrangement was made possible by both countries' common membership of both the European Single Market and EU Customs Union, and of their Common Travel Area.

The DUP threatened to pull out of Stormont's power-sharing government on 9 September 2021, triggering a snap election "within weeks" unless the protocol was scrapped. Donaldson warned: "I say not as a threat but as a matter of political reality that our political institutions will not survive a failure to resolve the problems the Protocol has created." The following week, SDLP leader Colum Eastwood accused the DUP of having a "petulant strop" and called for a new law to stop an early election. He told peers that the "delicate constitutional balance" in Northern Ireland was "too fragile for people to play games with".

On 3 February 2022, Givan resigned as First Minister in protest over the protocol, which automatically resulted in the Deputy First Minister losing her role and the Northern Ireland Executive collapsing. Conservative MP Jacob Rees-Mogg said that the UK government would "reform" the protocol if the EU did not, whilst it was also reported that Westminster was planning legislation that would give ministers powers to abolish the protocol altogether. During a rally in Ballymena on 30 April, TUV leader Jim Allister said that the Executive would not be returning unless the protocol was removed.

=== Calls for early election ===
Following the collapse of the Assembly, Sinn Féin and the DUP both called for the election to be brought forward, but the UUP, SDLP and Alliance Party opposed the idea. Northern Ireland Secretary Brandon Lewis ruled out an early election, saying that the priority was to get the Assembly up and running again. Two weeks later, however, Lewis claimed there was "a real risk" that the Executive would not return after the election.

== Candidates ==
Nominations opened on 29 March 2022 for the assembly election and closed on 8 April 2022.

A total of 239 candidates contested the 90 available seats in the Assembly, an increase from 228 in 2016. Eighty-seven women ran as candidates in the election, which is the highest number in history. The seats were spread over 18 constituencies, with each constituency having five seats. The election was conducted using the single transferable vote system.

The table below lists all of the nominated candidates.

- * indicates an incumbent MLA
- ** indicates the candidate is the incumbent MLA for a different constituency
- ^ indicates a former MLA who was not a member at the dissolution of the 2017–22 Assembly
- Leaders of parties represented in the assembly at dissolution are shown in **bold text**
- Elected candidates are marked with an (E)

Constituency	DUP	SF	SDLP	UUP	Alliance	TUV	Green	PBP	Aontú	Independent	Others
Belfast East	David Brooks (E); Joanne Bunting* (E)	Mairéad O'Donnell	Charlotte Carson	Andy Allen* (E); Lauren Kerr	**Naomi Long*** (E); Peter McReynolds (E)	John Ross	Brian Smyth	Hannah Kenny			Karl Bennett (PUP); Eoin MacNeill (WP)
Belfast North	Phillip Brett (E); Brian Kingston (E)	Gerry Kelly* (E); Carál Ní Chuilín* (E)	Nichola Mallon*	Julie-Anne Corr-Johnston	Nuala McAllister (E)	Ron McDowell	Mal O'Hara	Fiona Ferguson	Seán Mac Niocaill	Stafford Ward	Billy Hutchinson^ (PUP); Lily Kerr (WP)
Belfast South	Edwin Poots* (E)	Deirdre Hargey* (E)	Matthew O'Toole* (E); Elsie Trainor	Stephen McCarthy	Paula Bradshaw* (E); Kate Nicholl (E)	Andrew Girvin	**Clare Bailey***	Sipho Sibanda	Luke McCann	Elly Odhiambo	Paddy Lynn (WP); Neil Moore (SP)
Belfast West	Frank McCoubrey	Danny Baker (E); Órlaithí Flynn* (E); Aisling Reilly* (E); Pat Sheehan* (E)	Paul Doherty	Linsey Gibson	Donnamarie Higgins	Jordan Doran	Stevie Maginn	Gerry Carroll* (E)	Gerard Herdman	Gerard Burns; Declan Hill; Tony Mallon	Patrick Crossan (WP); Dan Murphy (IRSP)
East Antrim	David Hilditch* (E); Gordon Lyons* (E)	Oliver McMullan^	Siobhán McAlister	John Stewart* (E); Roy Beggs Jr*	Stewart Dickson* (E); Danny Donnelly (E)	Norman Boyd^	Mark Bailey				
East Londonderry	Maurice Bradley* (E); Alan Robinson (E)	Caoimhe Archibald* (E); Kathleen McGurk	Cara Hunter* (E)	Darryl Wilson	Chris McCaw	Jordan Armstrong	Mark Coulson	Amy Merron	Gemma Brolly	Claire Sugden* (Ind U) (E); Niall Murphy; Stephanie Quigley; Billy Stewart	Russell Watton (PUP)
Fermanagh and South Tyrone	Deborah Erskine* (E); Paul Bell	Jemma Dolan* (E); Colm Gildernew* (E); Áine Murphy* (E)	Adam Gannon	Tom Elliott^ (E); Rosemary Barton*	Matthew Beaumont	Alex Elliott	Kellie Turtle	Emmett Kilpatrick	Denise Mullen	Derek Backhouse; Emma DeSouza	Donal O'Cofaigh (CCLA)
Foyle	Gary Middleton* (E)	Pádraig Delargy* (E); Ciara Ferguson* (E)	Mark H. Durkan* (E); Sinead McLaughlin* (E); Brian Tierney	Ryan McCready	Rachael Ferguson	Elizabeth Neely	Gillian Hamilton	Shaun Harkin	Emmet Doyle	Anne McCloskey	Colly McLaughlin (IRSP)
Lagan Valley	**Jeffrey Donaldson**^ (E); Paul Givan* (E)	Gary McCleave	Pat Catney*	Robbie Butler* (E); Laura Turner	Sorcha Eastwood (E); David Honeyford (E)	Lorna Smyth	Simon Lee	Amanda Doherty		Gary Hynds	
Mid Ulster	Keith Buchanan* (E)	Linda Dillon* (E); **Michelle O'Neill*** (E); Emma Sheerin* (E)	Patsy McGlone* (E)	Meta Graham	Claire Hackett	Glenn Moore	Stefan Taylor (Note: Taylor was suspended from the Greens on 29 April 2022, though his name still appeared on the ballot.)	Sophia McFeely	Alixandra Halliday	Patrick Haughey	Conor Rafferty (Resume NI); Hugh Scullion (WP)
Newry and Armagh	William Irwin* (E)	Cathal Boylan* (E); Liz Kimmins* (E); Conor Murphy* (E)	Justin McNulty* (E)	David Taylor	Jackie Coade	Keith Ratcliffe	Ciara Henry		Daniel Connolly	Gavin Malone	Nicola Grant (WP)
North Antrim	Paul Frew* (E); Mervyn Storey*	Philip McGuigan* (E)	Eugene Reid	Robin Swann* (E); Bethany Ferris	Patricia O'Lynn (E)	**Jim Allister*** (E); Matthew Armstrong	Paul Veronica			Laird Shingleton	
North Down	Stephen Dunne* (E); Jennifer Gilmour	Thérèse McCartney	Déirdre Vaughan	Alan Chambers* (E); Naomi McBurney	Connie Egan (E); Andrew Muir* (E)	John Gordon	Rachel Woods*			Alex Easton* (Ind U) (E); Chris Carter; Ray McKimm	Matthew Robinson (Con)
South Antrim	Pam Cameron* (E); Trevor Clarke* (E)	Declan Kearney* (E)	Roisin Lynch	Steve Aiken* (E); Paul Michael	John Blair* (E)	Mel Lucas	Lesley Veronica	Jerry Maguire	Róisín Bennett	Andrew Moran	
South Down	Diane Forsythe (E)	Sinéad Ennis* (E); Cathy Mason (E)	Colin McGrath* (E); Karen McKevitt^	Jill Macauley	Patrick Brown (E)	Harold McKee^	Noeleen Lynch	Paul McCrory	Rosemary McGlone	Patrick Clarke	
Strangford	Harry Harvey* (E); Michelle McIlveen* (E); Peter Weir*	Róisé McGivern	Conor Houston	Mike Nesbitt* (E); Philip Smith^	Kellie Armstrong* (E); Nick Mathison (E)	Stephen Cooper	Maurice Macartney			Ben King	
Upper Bann	Jonathan Buckley* (E); Diane Dodds* (E)	John O'Dowd* (E); Liam Mackle	Dolores Kelly*	**Doug Beattie*** (E); Glenn Barr	Eóin Tennyson (E)	Darrin Foster	Lauren Kendall		Aidan Gribbin		Glenn Beattie (Heritage)
West Tyrone	Tom Buchanan* (E)	Nicola Brogan* (E); Declan McAleer* (E); Maolíosa McHugh* (E)	Daniel McCrossan* (E)	Ian Marshall	Stephen Donnelly	Trevor Clarke	Susan Glass	Carol Gallagher	James Hope	Barry Brown; Paul Gallagher	Amy Ferguson (SP)

== Members not seeking re-election ==
The following MLAs announced that they would not stand for re-election.

MLA	Constituency /region	First elected or co-opted	Party	Date announced
Trevor Lunn	Lagan Valley	2007	Independent (Note: Originally elected as Alliance)	22 February 2021
Emma Rogan	South Down	2017	Sinn Féin	19 May 2021
Sinéad Bradley	South Down	2016	SDLP	24 May 2021
Alex Maskey	Belfast West	1998	Sinn Féin	5 August 2021
Chris Lyttle	Belfast East	2010	Alliance	29 October 2021
Robin Newton	Belfast East	2003	DUP	2 February 2022
George Robinson	East Londonderry	2003	DUP	17 March 2022
William Humphrey	Belfast North	2010	DUP	17 March 2022
Paula Bradley	Belfast North	2011	DUP	17 March 2022
Paul Rankin	Lagan Valley	2022	DUP	17 March 2022
Jim Wells	South Down	1998	Ind. Unionist (Note: Originally elected as DUP)	23 March 2022

== Campaign ==
The Sinn Féin campaign avoided talk of a united Ireland, instead focusing on "bread and butter" issues. Sinn Féin called for a £230 payment to help people with the cost of living. A threat to destroy a Sinn Féin billboard was reported to the police. The Social Democratic and Labour Party's campaign had reportedly been difficult. Candidate Elsie Trainor was attacked by youths in Belfast who also hurled sectarian abuse. Leader Colum Eastwood urged tactical voting. Aontú was the only Irish nationalist party to campaign on an anti-abortion platform.

The Democratic Unionist Party campaign focused on their opposition to the Northern Ireland Protocol, Sinn Féin and the prospect of a referendum on Irish unity. The Traditional Unionist Voice said that opposing the Northern Ireland Protocol is "top priority". They received a number of defections from the DUP. In contrast to the DUP, the Ulster Unionist Party leader Doug Beattie said a united Ireland would not happen in his or his children's lifetime, thus "we can set it aside in order to concentrate on the issues affecting the daily lives of our people who live here". All three unionist leaders attended a series of rallies against the Protocol. In March, Beattie announced he would continue to oppose the Protocol but would no longer take part in the rallies. Beattie said they had been hijacked by loyalists to raise tensions "that now see a resurgence in UVF activity". Following this, his constituency office in Portadown was attacked, and an election poster with a noose around his neck appeared at a loyalist rally in Lurgan.

The Alliance Party advocated reform of the Stormont institutions to remove the designation system and avoid a "cycle of collapse". It also advocated health reform and the introduction of a child payment scheme to support people with the cost of living. The party further promised to build Casement Park, positioned itself as the "centre ground" and campaigned in constituencies west of the River Bann, where they have never won any seats.

The Green Party pledged the establishment of a bill of rights, an independent Environmental Protection Agency, and rent controls. The People Before Profit manifesto was launched on 22 April. In it, they promised a £1,000 to help with cost of living. On 30 April, PBP candidate Hannah Kenny was attacked by three men in East Belfast, who also subjected her to "sectarian and misogynistic" abuse.

On 13 April, it was reported that the Police Service of Northern Ireland had been notified of 41 political poster incidents.

Televised debates between the party leaders were held on 1 May and 3 May.

2022 Northern Ireland Assembly debates
Date scheduled	Organisers	Moderator(s)	P Present (Note: Denotes a main invitee attending the event.)					Audience	Ref.
Date scheduled	Organisers	Moderator(s)	DUP	SF	SDLP	UUP	Alliance	Audience	Ref.
1 May	UTV	Marc Mallett	P Donaldson	P O'Neill	P Eastwood	P Beattie	P Long	Yes	
3 May	BBC One Northern Ireland	Jim Fitzpatrick	P Donaldson	P O'Neill	P Eastwood	P Beattie	P Long	Yes	

== Opinion polls ==
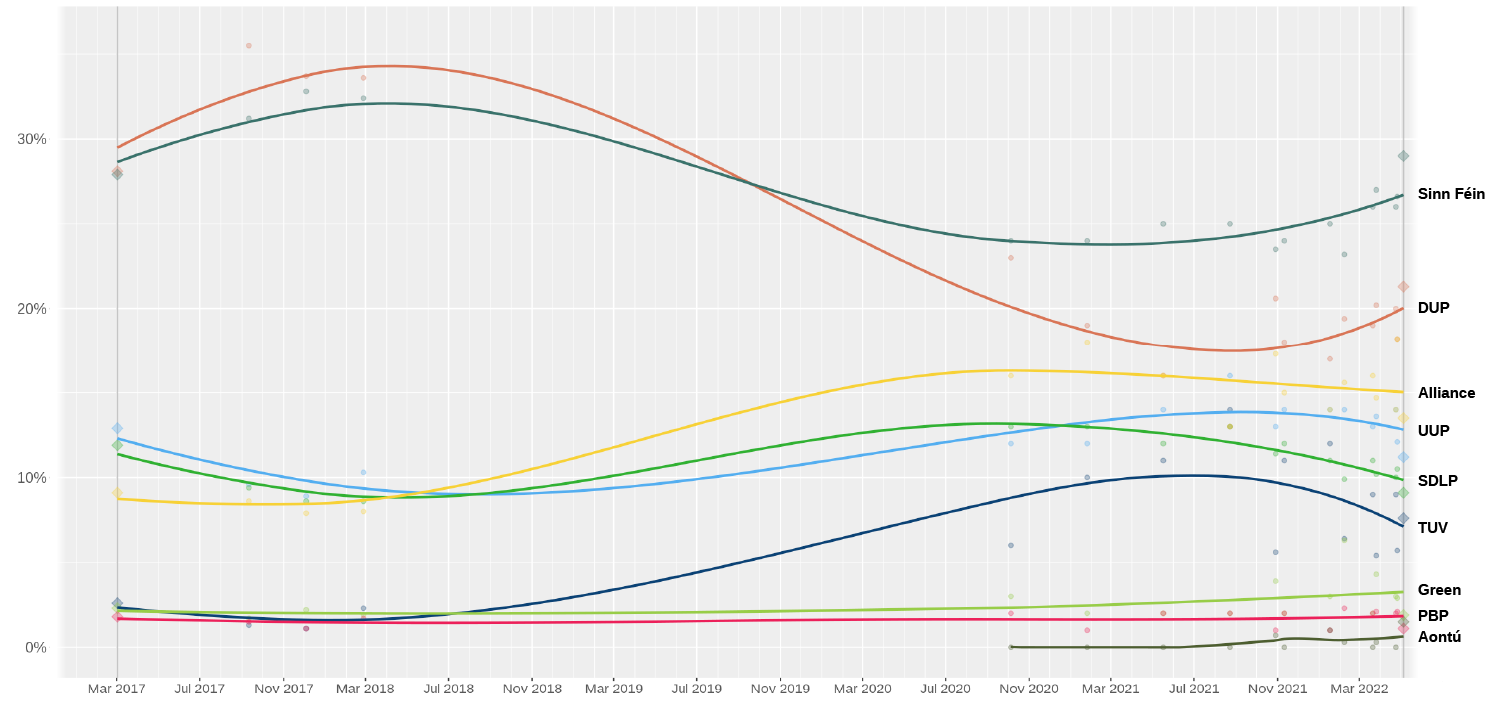
Local regression of polls conducted

Date(s) conducted	Pollster	Client	Sample size	DUP ^{U}	SF ^{N}	UUP ^{U}	SDLP ^{N}	APNI ^{O}	TUV ^{U}	Green ^{O}	PBP ^{O}	Aontú ^{N}	Other	Lead
5 May 2022	2022 Assembly election	–	–	21.3%	29.0%	11.2%	9.1%	13.5%	7.9%	1.9%	1.1%	1.5%	3.5%	7.7%
16–26 Apr 2022	Social Market Research	University of Liverpool/Irish News	1,270	18.2%	26.6%	12.1%	10.5%	18.2%	5.7%	2.9%	2.1%	TBD		8.4%
22–24 Apr 2022	LucidTalk	Belfast Telegraph	1,708	20%	26%	14%	10%	14%	9%	3%	2%	TBD	2%	6%
11–26 Mar 2022	Social Market Research	University of Liverpool/Irish News	1,000	20.2%	27.0%	13.6%	10.2%	14.7%	5.4%	4.3%	2.1%	0.3%	2.2%	6.8%
18–21 Mar 2022	LucidTalk	Belfast Telegraph	3,281	19%	26%	13%	11%	16%	9%	2%	2%	0%	2%	7%
25 Jan – 7 Feb 2022	Social Market Research	University of Liverpool/Irish News	1,002	19.4%	23.2%	14.0%	9.9%	15.6%	6.4%	6.3%	2.3%	0.3%	2.6%	3.8%
3 Feb 2022	Paul Givan resigns as First Minister													
14–17 Jan 2022	LucidTalk	Belfast Telegraph	3,112	17%	25%	14%	11%	14%	12%	3%	1%	1%	2%	8%
5–11 Nov 2021	LucidTalk	Belfast Telegraph	3,298	18%	24%	14%	12%	15%	11%	2%	2%	0%	2%	6%
21–29 Oct 2021	Social Market Research	University of Liverpool	1,002	20.6%	23.5%	13.0%	11.4%	17.3%	5.6%	3.9%	1.0%	0.7%	2.4%	2.9%
20–23 Aug 2021	LucidTalk	Belfast Telegraph	2,403	13%	25%	16%	13%	13%	14%	2%	2%	0%	2%	9%
30 Jun 2021	Jeffrey Donaldson becomes leader of the Democratic Unionist Party													
17 Jun 2021	Paul Givan becomes First Minister													
17 May 2021	Doug Beattie is elected leader of the Ulster Unionist Party													
14–17 May 2021	LucidTalk	Belfast Telegraph	3,072	16%	25%	14%	12%	16%	11%	2%	2%	0%	2%	9%
14 May 2021	Edwin Poots is elected leader of the Democratic Unionist Party													
22–25 Jan 2021	LucidTalk	Belfast Telegraph	2,295	19%	24%	12%	13%	18%	10%	2%	1%	0%	1%	5%
2–5 Oct 2020	LucidTalk	Belfast Telegraph	1,961	23%	24%	12%	13%	16%	6%	3%	2%	0%	1%	1%
31 Jan 2020	The United Kingdom leaves the European Union													
11 Jan 2020	The Executive is re-established													
12 Dec 2019	United Kingdom general election													
9 Nov 2019	Steve Aiken becomes leader of the Ulster Unionist Party													
23 May 2019	European Parliament election													
2 May 2019	Local elections													
23–26 Feb 2018	LucidTalk	Northern Slant	2,079	33.6%	32.4%	10.3%	8.6%	8.0%	2.3%	1.9%	1.7%	–	1.7%	1.2%
1–4 Dec 2017	LucidTalk	GUE/NGL	2,079	33.7%	32.8%	8.9%	8.6%	7.9%	1.1%	2.2%	1.1%	–	3.7%	0.9%
8–11 Sep 2017	LucidTalk	N/A	2,080	35.5%	31.2%	9.6%	9.4%	8.6%	1.3%	1.7%	1.5%	–	1.3%	4.3%
2 Mar 2017	2017 Assembly election	–	–	28.1%	27.9%	12.9%	11.9%	9.1%	2.6%	2.3%	1.8%	–	3.6%	0.2%

* (U): Unionist, (N): Nationalist, (O): Other

== Results ==
Votes were counted on 6 and 7 May. Sinn Féin became the largest party, making this the first time an Irish nationalist/republican party had won the most seats in an election in Northern Ireland, and making Michelle O'Neill Northern Ireland's first nationalist First Minister. As Northern Ireland's government is based on power-sharing, the DUP (as second-largest party) must nominate a deputy First Minister for the Executive to be formed; however, they said they will not do so until their issues with the Northern Ireland Protocol are dealt with.

The DUP's vote share dropped almost 7% and lost three seats; despite this, unionists won two more seats than nationalists—37 seats to 35—and a marginally higher share of the vote. This being said, socialist party People Before Profit—who returned one candidate to the Assembly—favour a united socialist Ireland, though they officially designated themselves as Socialist, rather than Nationalist or Unionist, on the electoral register. Indeed, both nationalist parties (4) and unionist parties (3) lost seats overall to 'Others', who gained 7 seats for their highest ever proportion of seats in the assembly, 18 seats, or 20% of those available, despite both Green candidates losing their seats. Unionist parties lost greater combined vote share, losing just over 2.5% of the total vote, whereas nationalist parties (including newcomers Aontú) lost only around 0.5% of vote share combined.

Alliance achieved their highest ever first-preference vote share in an Assembly election, becoming the third-largest party in the Assembly and increasing their vote share by over 50%, going from 9% to 13.5%. They overtook the UUP (who lost one seat) and the SDLP (who lost four), who both received their lowest ever vote shares. The TUV also achieved their highest ever vote share (gaining 5% since the last election and thereby tripling their vote share) but they did not win any more seats. The Greens lost both seats they held before the election and were out of the Assembly for the first time since 2003. Alex Easton, who left the DUP in 2021, was re-elected as an independent unionist, as was the former Justice Minister, Claire Sugden. Colum Eastwood believed SDLP voters gave their support to Sinn Féin in this election, saying "there's a tide there and people wanted to send a message, they wanted to kick the DUP and I think this is how they decided to do it".

Party	Votes	%	+/–	Seats			
Party	Votes	%	+/–	Assembly	+/–	Executive	+/–
Sinn Féin	250,388	29.02	+1.1	27	–	5	+1
Democratic Unionist Party	184,002	21.33	-6.7	25	-3	4	-1
Alliance Party of Northern Ireland	116,681	13.53	+4.5	17	+9	2	+1
Ulster Unionist Party	96,390	11.17	-1.7	9	-1	1	–
Social Democratic and Labour Party	78,237	9.07	-2.9	8	-4	0	-1
Traditional Unionist Voice	65,788	7.63	+5.0	1	–	–	–
Green Party Northern Ireland	16,433	1.90	-0.4	–	-2	–	–
Aontú	12,777	1.48	New	–	New	–	–
People Before Profit	9,798	1.14	-0.6	1	–	–	–
Progressive Unionist Party	2,665	0.31	-0.4	–	–	–	–
Irish Republican Socialist Party	1,869	0.22	New	–	New	–	–
Workers' Party	839	0.10	-0.1	–	–	–	–
Cross-Community Labour Alternative	602	0.07	-0.3	–	–	–	–
Socialist Party	524	0.06	New	–	New	–	–
Northern Ireland Conservatives	254	0.03	-0.3	–	–	–	–
Heritage Party	128	0.01	New	–	New	–	–
Resume Party	13	0.00	New	–	New	–	–
Independent	25,315	2.93	+1.1	2	+1	–	–
**Total**	**862,703**	**100.00**	–	**90**	**0**	**12**	**0**
Valid votes	862,703	98.73					
Invalid/blank votes	11,078	1.27					
Total votes	**873,781**	**100.00**					
Registered voters/turnout	1,373,731	63.61					

Map of the results

Seats won by each party per constituency, with turnout and vote share.

Seats per constituency, by party and designation (Nationalist, Unionist, Other)

=== Distribution of seats by constituency ===
Party affiliation of the five Assembly members returned by each constituency. The first column indicates the party of the Member of the House of Commons (MP) returned by the corresponding parliamentary constituency in the 2019 United Kingdom general election under the first-past-the-post voting method.

Party of MP, 2019	Constituency	Northern Ireland Assembly seats											
Party of MP, 2019	Constituency	Total										Gained by	Formerly held by
Party of MP, 2019	Constituency	Total	PBP	Green	Sinn Féin	SDLP	APNI	UUP	DUP	TUV	Ind.	Gained by	Formerly held by
DUP	North Antrim	5	–	–	1	–	1	1	1	1	–	Alliance	DUP
DUP	East Antrim	5	–	–	–	–	2	1	2	–	–	Alliance	UUP
DUP	South Antrim	5	–	–	1	–	1	1	2	–	–	–	–
Sinn Féin	Belfast North	5	–	–	2	–	1	–	2	–	–	Alliance	SDLP
Sinn Féin	Belfast West	5	1	–	4	–	–	–	–	–	–	–	–
SDLP	Belfast South	5	–	–	1	1	2	–	1	–	–	Alliance	Green
DUP	Belfast East	5	–	–	–	–	2	1	2	–	–	–	–
Alliance	North Down	5	–	–	–	–	2	1	1	–	1	Ind. U.	DUP
Alliance	North Down	5	–	–	–	–	2	1	1	–	1	Alliance	Green
DUP	Strangford	5	–	–	–	–	2	1	2	–	–	Alliance	DUP
DUP	Lagan Valley	5	–	–	–	–	2	1	2	–	–	Alliance	SDLP
DUP	Upper Bann	5	–	–	1	–	1	1	2	–	–	Alliance	SDLP
Sinn Féin	South Down	5	–	–	2	1	1	–	1	–	–	Alliance	SDLP
Sinn Féin	Newry and Armagh	5	–	–	3	1	–	–	1	–	–	–	–
Sinn Féin	Fermanagh & South Tyrone	5	–	–	3	–	–	1	1	–	–	–	–
Sinn Féin	West Tyrone	5	–	–	3	1	–	–	1	–	–	–	–
Sinn Féin	Mid Ulster	5	–	–	3	1	–	–	1	–	–	–	–
SDLP	Foyle	5	–	–	2	2	–	–	1	–	–	–	–
DUP	East Londonderry	5	–	–	1	1	–	–	2	–	1	–	–
**Total**		**90**	1	0	27	8	17	9	25	1	2		
Change since 2017		–	–	–2	–	–4	+9	–1	−3	–	+1	–	–
Elected on 2 March 2017		90	1	2	27	12	8	10	28	1	1	–	–
Elected on 5 May 2016		108	2	2	28	12	8	16	38	1	1	–	–
Elected on 5 May 2011		108	0	1	29	14	8	16	38	1	1	–	–
Elected on 7 March 2007		108	–	1	28	16	7	18	36	–	1	1 Prog. U.	–
Elected on 23 November 2003		108	–	–	24	18	6	27	30	–	1	1 Prog. U.	1 UKUP
Elected on 25 June 1998		108	–	–	18	24	6	28	20	–	4	2 Prog. U.	5 UKUP, 2 NIWC

=== Share of first-preference votes ===
Percentage of each constituency's first-preference votes. Absolute majorities are in bold. The constituencies are arranged in the geographic order described for the table above; click the icon next to "Constituency" to see them in alphabetical order.

The totals given here are the sum of all valid ballots cast in each constituency, and the percentages are based on such totals. The turnout percentages in the last column, however, are based upon all ballots cast, which also include anything from twenty to a thousand invalid ballots in each constituency. The total valid ballots' percentage of the eligible electorate can correspondingly differ by 0.1% to 2% from the turnout percentage.

All constituencies were five-seat constituencies, with members elected under the Single transferable vote system. The quota in each constituency was therefore approximately 16.67% of the vote in the constituency. However, in some cases, despite a party gaining more than that share of the vote, imperfect transfer discipline between candidates meant that a seat was not automatically gained.

Member of Parliament, 2019		Constituency	Northern Ireland Assembly seats													
Party	Proportion of vote	Constituency												Total votes	Eligible elector- ate	Turn- out
Party	Proportion of vote	Constituency	PBP	Aontú	Sinn Féin	SDLP	Green	APNI	UUP	DUP	TUV	Ind.	Others	Total votes	Eligible elector- ate	Turn- out
DUP	47.4%	North Antrim			18.5	3.8	0.7	9.5	20.5	25.7	21.3	0.1		51,220	81,935	62.5%
DUP	45.3%	East Antrim			9.1	3.0	1.9	23.1	24.2	29.6	9.1			40,693	67,699	60.1%
DUP	35.3%	South Antrim	0.6	1.4	20.1	6.9	1.2	16.0	17.9	25.9	9.6	0.6		46,195	76,950	60.0%
Sinn Féin	47.1%	Belfast North	2.3	1.4	35.5	7.8	3.1	9.5	5.7	24.3	7.3	1.1	2.0	46,796	75,801	61.7%
Sinn Féin	**53.8%**	Belfast West	7.5	4.0	**63.7**	5.8	0.7	2.1	1.1	9.5	1.8	0.8	3.0	44,440	68,727	64.7%
SDLP	**57.2%**	Belfast South	1.3	1.7	20.3	15.8	8.7	24.9	6.5	15.4	4.1	0.2	1.1	47,306	73,497	64.4%
DUP	49.2%	Belfast East	1.2		3.2	1.1	5.3	32.4	15.2	32.1	7.1		2.4	43,840	70,123	62.5%
Alliance	45.2%	North Down			1.7	1.7	6.6	28.9	12.4	19.9	3.8	24.5	0.6	42,198	70,176	60.1%
DUP	47.2%	Strangford			3.9	6.0	2.0	24.1	15.2	33.8	12.7	0.3		41,345	70,775	58.4%
DUP	43.1%	Lagan Valley	0.5		5.3	6.3	1.3	24.3	19.3	34.7	6.8	1.4		51,543	81,562	63.2%
DUP	41.0%	Upper Bann		1.0	29.4	6.5	0.8	11.5	15.3	27.5	8.4		0.2	56,954	91,149	62.5%
Sinn Féin	32.4%	South Down		1.0	44.3	16.5	0.8	12.6	5.2	11.8	6.0	0.2		55,631	84,046	66.2%
Sinn Féin	40.0%	Newry & Armagh		2.0	47.0	10.6	0.5	5.7	6.6	12.9	9.2	5.4	0.3	59,693	87,156	68.5%
Sinn Féin	43.3%	Fermanagh & S. Tyrone	0.2	1.7	44.7	7.1	0.6	5.3	15.5	17.7	5.8	0.7	1.1	54,560	78,963	69.1%
Sinn Féin	40.2%	West Tyrone	0.8	1.4	47.0	11.9	0.6	6.5	4.1	14.4	9.1	3.9	0.4	46,629	69,702	66.9%
Sinn Féin	45.9%	Mid Ulster	0.4	2.5	**52.7**	10.0	0.3	4.1	4.2	16.5	7.4	1.7	0.2	52,274	75,168	69.5%
SDLP	**57.0%**	Foyle	5.6	4.3	32.8	30.8	0.5	4.7	8.0	8.8	1.1	1.8	1.6	47,674	77,343	61.6%
DUP	40.1%	East Londonderry	0.8	2.5	25.6	8.3	0.8	7.5	5.9	26.9	6.7	13.0	2.1	44,796	72,959	61.4%
**Northern Ireland**			1.1	1.5	29.0	9.1	1.9	13.5	11.2	21.3	7.6	2.9	0.8	**873,781**	1,373,731	63.6%
Change since 2017			−0.7	+1.5	+1.1	−2.8	−0.4	+4.4	−1.7	−6.8	+5.0	+1.1	−1.0	+60,998	+119,022	−1.2%
Election of March 2017			1.8		27.9	11.9	2.3	9.1	12.9	28.1	2.6	1.8	1.8	812,783	1,254,709	64.8%
Election of May 2016			2.0		24.0	12.0	2.7	7.0	12.6	29.2	3.4	3.9	3.3	703,744	1,281,595	54.9%
Election of May 2011					26.9	14.2	0.9	7.7	13.2	30.0	2.5	2.2	2.3	661,736	1,210,009	55.6%
Election of March 2007					26.2	15.2	1.7	5.2	14.9	30.1		3.8	2.8	690,313	1,107,904	62.9%
Election of Nov. 2003					23.5	17.0	0.4	3.7	22.7	25.7		5.6	2.8	692,026	1,097,526	63.1%
Election of June 1998					17.6	22.0	0.1	6.5	21.3	18.1		10.9	3.5	823,565	1,178,556	69.9%

=== Incumbents defeated ===
Defeated MLA	Party	Constituency	New MLA	Party	Ref.
Roy Beggs Jr	UUP	East Antrim	Danny Donnelly	Alliance	
Dolores Kelly	SDLP	Upper Bann	Eóin Tennyson	Alliance	
Peter Weir	DUP	Strangford	Nick Mathison	Alliance	
Pat Catney	SDLP	Lagan Valley	David Honeyford	Alliance	
Clare Bailey	Green (NI)	Belfast South	Kate Nicholl	Alliance	
Mervyn Storey	DUP	North Antrim	Patricia O'Lynn	Alliance	
Rosemary Barton	UUP	Fermanagh and South Tyrone	Tom Elliott	UUP	
Nichola Mallon	SDLP	Belfast North	Nuala McAllister	Alliance	
Rachel Woods	Green (NI)	North Down	Connie Egan	Alliance	

== Aftermath ==
Shortly before the final results were announced, O'Neill said: "Today ushers in a new era. Irrespective of religious, political or social backgrounds, my commitment is to make politics work." Donaldson stated that the Executive would not sit unless the Northern Ireland Protocol was removed. He later announced that he would not take his Assembly seat, which was co-opted by Emma Little-Pengelly, and the DUP would not be nominating a Speaker until the UK government took "decisive action".

The SDLP responded by accusing the DUP of treating voters with contempt and "mak[ing] our electoral process look like a bad joke". Naomi Long, leader of Alliance, said DUP Assembly Members should not be allowed to claim their salary while they prevented the Assembly from functioning. These disagreements continued a political crisis from before the election, prompting Prime Minister Boris Johnson to visit Northern Ireland to discuss amendments to the Protocol.

The Democratic Unionist Party (DUP) refused to resume power sharing due to its stance on the protocol. In the absence of an executive being formed, a new election should be called. However, the UK government got primary legislation passed three times to extend the deadline. Multiple negotiations with the DUP and the agreement of the Windsor Framework with the EU failed to produce a resolution.

However, on 30 January 2024, the DUP announced that it had accepted a deal (conditional on legislation being passed by the UK government) that saw it agreeing to form an executive. The Assembly first met on 3 February 2024, which saw Emma Little-Pengelly confirmed as Deputy First Minister, and Michelle O'Neill confirmed as First Minister, with a new executive formed the same day.

== See also ==
Other elections in the UK that were held on the same day:

- 2022 United Kingdom local elections
- 2022 Scottish local elections
- 2022 Welsh local elections
