= Peter Weir (disambiguation) =

Peter Weir (born 1944) is an Australian film director.

Peter Weir may also refer to:

- Peter Weir (politician) (born 1968), Northern Irish politician
- Peter Weir (footballer) (born 1958), Scottish footballer
- Peter Ingram Weir (1864–1943), Scottish artist
