= Martina Anderson =

Irish politician from Northern Ireland

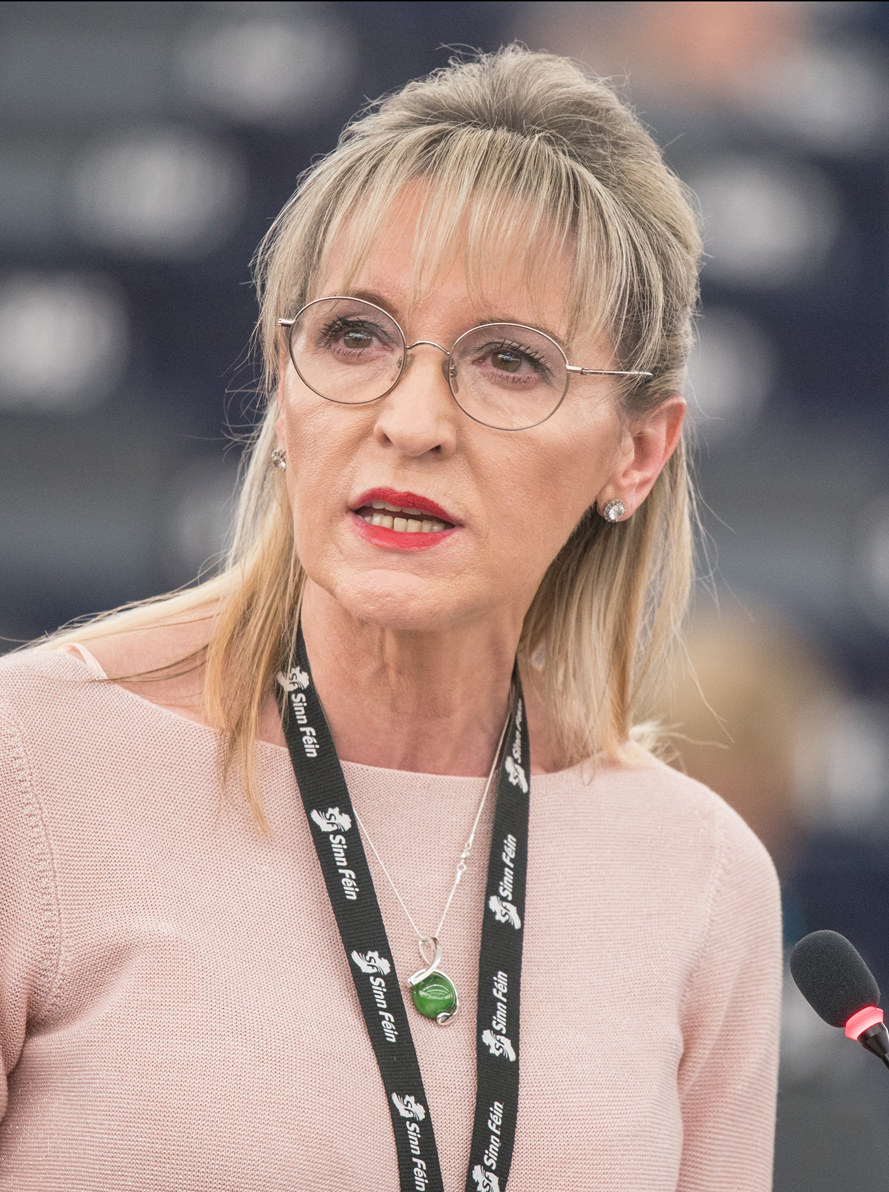

Member of the European Parliament for Northern Ireland
- In office 12 June 2012 – 31 January 2020
- Preceded by: Bairbre de Brún
- Succeeded by: Constituency abolished
- Parliamentary group: GUE/NGL

Junior Minister Assisting the Deputy First Minister
- In office 16 May 2011 – 11 June 2012 Serving with Jonathan Bell
- Deputy FM: Martin McGuinness
- Preceded by: Gerry Kelly
- Succeeded by: Jennifer McCann

Member of the Legislative Assembly for Foyle
- In office 10 February 2020 – 13 September 2021
- Preceded by: Raymond McCartney
- Succeeded by: Pádraig Delargy; Ciara Ferguson
- In office 7 March 2007 – 11 June 2012
- Preceded by: Mitchel McLaughlin
- Succeeded by: Maeve McLaughlin

Chair of the European Parliament Delegation for relations with Palestine
- In office 13 October 2014 – 29 January 2017
- Preceded by: Proinsias De Rossa
- Succeeded by: Neoklis Sylikiotis

Personal details
- Born: 16 April 1962 (age 64) Derry, Northern Ireland
- Party: Sinn Féin
- Spouse: Paul Kavanagh
- Website: martinamep.eu

Martina Anderson (born 16 April 1962) is an Irish former politician from Northern Ireland who served as Member of the Legislative Assembly (MLA) for Foyle from 2020 to 2021, and previously from 2007 to 2012. A member of Sinn Féin, she served as a Member of the European Parliament (MEP) representing Northern Ireland from 2012 to 2020.

She became involved in the Irish republican movement in the late 1970s and is a former Provisional Irish Republican Army (IRA) volunteer. In June 1986, she was convicted of conspiring to cause explosions and sentenced to life in prison. She was released 13 years later as a condition of the Good Friday Agreement and subsequently became involved in politics for Sinn Féin.

She was a Member of the Legislative Assembly of Northern Ireland from 2007 to 2012, representing Foyle. She served in the Northern Ireland Executive as a Junior Minister at the Office of the First Minister and deputy First Minister from 2011 to 2012. In 2012, she became a Member of the European Parliament, and she was reelected in 2014 and in 2019. She left the European Parliament in 2020 and returned to the Northern Ireland Assembly.

== Early life ==
Anderson was born in the Bogside in Derry, Northern Ireland, into a well-known Irish republican family. Her father was a Protestant. She has six sisters and three brothers, one of whom, Peter, is a former Sinn Féin councillor, and her niece is former Irish Senator and former Foyle MP Elisha McCallion. She was educated at St Cecilia's College between 1973 and 1980.

== IRA activity ==
Anderson was arrested aged 18 leaving a furniture store in Derry and charged with possession of a firearm and causing an explosion. She was released on bail after spending two months in Armagh Women's Prison and fled across the border to Buncrana in County Donegal.

Anderson was again arrested on 24 June 1985 at a flat in Glasgow with four other IRA members including Brighton bomber Patrick Magee. On 11 June 1986, all five were convicted of conspiring to cause explosions in England, although Magee was the only person convicted in relation to the Brighton hotel bombing.

In 1989, Anderson married fellow prisoner and IRA member Paul Kavanagh at Full Sutton Prison. By 1993, she was one of just two female category A prisoners in England, the other being fellow republican Ella O'Dwyer. While at Durham Prison, Anderson obtained a first-class honours degree in social science from the Open University. In 1994, she was transferred from Durham to Maghaberry Prison in Northern Ireland. On 10 November 1998, Anderson was released under the terms of the Good Friday Agreement.

== Political career ==
In 2007, Anderson was elected to the Northern Ireland Assembly as a Sinn Féin member for Foyle, along with Raymond McCartney.

In May 2007, Anderson became one of the first Sinn Féin members to join the Northern Ireland Policing Board.

In December 2007, Anderson said she was concerned that large numbers of migrant workers from mainly Catholic countries were being classed as 'Catholic/nationalist' in monitoring forms, rather than 'other'. She said "Given that the entire basis of the legislation around monitoring was put in place to identify imbalances in the workforce between the local Catholic/nationalist and Protestant/unionist communities it is therefore vital that given the addition of migrant workers in the workforce, that they should clearly be categorised as having a community background of 'other'." Employment monitoring by the Equality Commission records solely religion, and not political affiliation.

She was selected by Sinn Féin to fight the Foyle constituency at the 2010 Westminster general election. She lost to the SDLP incumbent, Mark Durkan, by 5,000 votes (11% of the vote). In May 2012 it was announced that she would be replacing Bairbre de Brún, as MEP for Northern Ireland. Anderson retained her MEP seat in the 2014 election, topping the poll with 159,813 first-preference votes.

In May 2016, she criticised the presence of Israeli lobbyists in the European Parliament: "We can give you a list of all the things we attempted to do, the Israelis are all over this place like a rash." In response the European Jewish Congress called on Martin Schulz, president of the European Parliament, to discipline her. Anderson said she meant the word "rash" as a metaphor.

In the 2019 European Parliament elections, Anderson was returned on the fifth ballot, after Diane Dodds of the Democratic Unionist Party and Naomi Long of Alliance. After her seat was abolished due to Brexit, on 10 February 2020 she became an MLA for Foyle for a second time, after being selected by Sinn Féin to replace Raymond McCartney.

On 4 May 2021, Anderson announced she would not be contesting the 2022 Northern Ireland Assembly election, following an internal party review of recent election results in Foyle. She resigned from the Assembly with Karen Mullan in September and was replaced by Pádraig Delargy and Ciara Ferguson. Anderson's sister, Sharon Burke, claimed that Anderson had been used as a "sacrificial lamb" by Sinn Féin. "The British could not do to our Martina what her comrades and friends have done," Burke wrote on Facebook.

In 2026 she disclosed at a book launch that she had had an abortion in order not to impede an IRA operation.

Political offices
European Parliament
| Preceded by Bairbre de Brún | MEP for Northern Ireland; 2012 – 2020 | Constituency abolished |
Northern Ireland Assembly
| Preceded by Mitchel McLaughlin | MLA for Foyle; 2007–2012 | Succeeded by Maeve McLaughlin |
| Preceded by Raymond McCartney | MLA for Foyle; 2020-present | Incumbent |
Political offices
| Preceded by Gerry Kelly | Junior Minister; 2011–2012 | Succeeded by Jennifer McCann |
