= Karen Mullan =

Northern Irish politician (born 1976)

Karen Mullan MLA
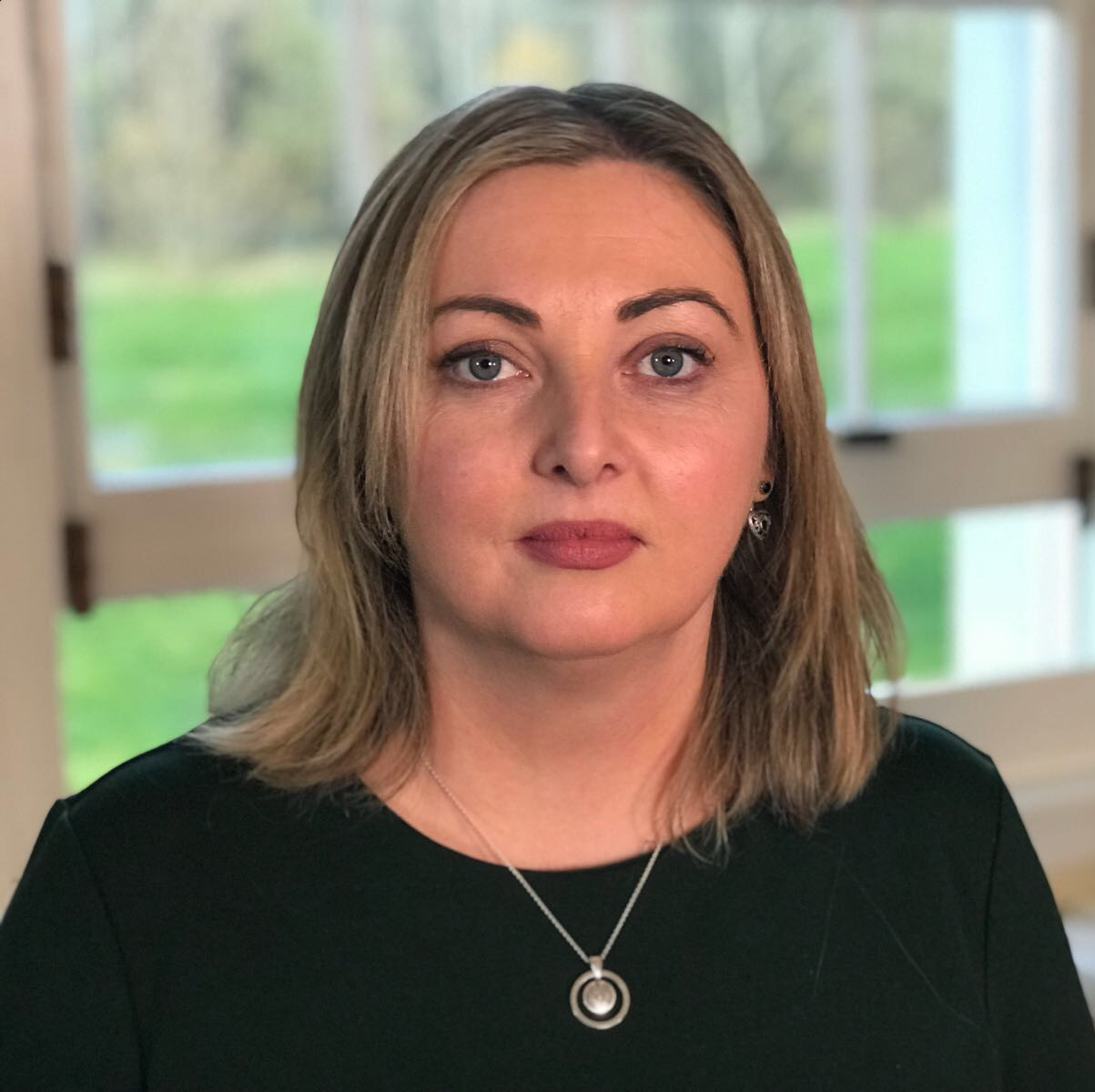
- Karen Mullan at Stormont

Member of the Legislative Assembly for Foyle
- In office 20 June 2017 – 13 September 2021
- Preceded by: Elisha McCallion
- Succeeded by: Pádraig Delargy

Personal details
- Born: 18 August 1976 (age 49) Derry, Northern Ireland
- Party: Sinn Féin

Karen Mullan MLA (born 18 August 1976) is a former Sinn Féin politician from Derry, Northern Ireland who served as a Member of the Legislative Assembly for the Foyle constituency in the Northern Ireland Assembly from June 2017 to 2021.

== History ==
Mullan served as a community worker in Derry prior to her co-option by Sinn Féin. She was co-opted after Foyle MLA Elisha McCallion was elected to the House of Commons following the 2017 general election. Mullan was Sinn Féin's northern education spokesperson in the assembly.

She is a graduate of Ulster University with a degree in community development, and is a former manager of Hillcrest Trust, a community centre in the Waterside area of Derry.

She played a key role in setting up a charity, Pink Ladies Cancer Support Group, which lobbied for the delivery of the North-West Cancer Centre at Altnagelvin Hospital in Derry.

She left the assembly with Martina Anderson on 13 September 2021 being replaced by Pádraig Delargy and Ciara Ferguson.

=== Controversy ===
Mullan is also a director of Waterside Neighbourhood Partnership, which is a community group based in Derry. The organisation was found guilty in 2017 of having unlawfully discriminated against a job applicant based on political opinion. The organisation was ordered to pay £11,000 to the applicant, who was the highest-scoring candidate in the interviews. Giving evidence at the tribunal, Mullan revealed during cross-examination that an interview panellist informed her that they "had been bullied" into giving a better score. The tribunal said Mullan's evidence "lacked credibility".

Northern Ireland Assembly
Preceded by Elisha McCallion	MLA for Foyle; 2017–present	Incumbent
