= Peter Weir, Baron Weir of Ballyholme =

Northern Irish politician and life peer (born 1968)

The Right Honourable The Lord Weir of Ballyholme
- Official portrait, 2026

Minister for Education
- In office 11 January 2020 – 13 June 2021
- Preceded by: Himself (2017)
- Succeeded by: Michelle McIlveen
- In office 25 May 2016 – 2 March 2017
- Preceded by: John O'Dowd
- Succeeded by: Himself (2020)

Member of the House of Lords
- Lord Temporal
- Life peerage 16 November 2022

Member of the Northern Ireland Assembly for Strangford
- In office 2 March 2017 – 28 March 2022
- Preceded by: Jonathan Bell
- Succeeded by: Nick Mathison

Member of the Northern Ireland Assembly for North Down
- In office 25 June 1998 – 26 January 2017
- Preceded by: Constituency established

Member of North Down Borough Council
- In office 5 May 2005 – 22 May 2014
- Preceded by: Patricia Wallace
- Succeeded by: Council abolished
- Constituency: Ballyholme and Groomsport

Northern Ireland Forum Member for North Down
- In office 30 May 1996 – 25 April 1998
- Preceded by: New forum
- Succeeded by: Forum dissolved

Personal details
- Born: Peter James Weir; 21 November 1968 (age 57) Bangor, Northern Ireland
- Party: DUP (2002–present); UUP (until 2001)
- Education: Queen's University Belfast
- Profession: Barrister

Peter James Weir, Baron Weir of Ballyholme (born 21 November 1968), is a Democratic Unionist Party (DUP) politician who served as Minister for Education in the Northern Ireland Executive from 2016 to 2017 and from 2020 to 2021. Weir was the first non-Sinn Féin legislator (following Martin McGuinness, Caitríona Ruane, and John O'Dowd) to head the Department of Education since the department came into existence on 2 December 1999.

He served as a Member of the Northern Ireland Assembly (MLA) from 1998 to 2022, originally being a member for North Down, which he represented from 1998 to 2017, before being elected as a member for Strangford in 2017. He lost his seat at the 2022 Northern Ireland Assembly election. Since 2022 he has been a member of the House of Lords.

== Early life ==
Weir attended Bangor Grammar School and graduated from The Queen's University of Belfast in Law and Accountancy. He was called to the Bar of Northern Ireland in 1992 and is a former editor of The Ulster Review. Weir has been a member of the Queen's University Senate since 1996 and is also leading member of the University Convocation. He was elected to the Northern Ireland Peace Forum in 1996 for the constituency of North Down.

== Political career ==
Weir is a former chairman of the Young Unionists (the UUP Youth Wing).

Weir refused to support the Good Friday Agreement of 1998, saying in one television interview that the only positive comment he could summon for the Agreement was that it was "very nicely typed". A leading critic of then-party leader David Trimble's policies, Weir was elected to the Northern Ireland Assembly in the 1998 election.

Weir was selected as his party's candidate to fight the 2001 general election in North Down, but a month before the election tensions between him and the party reached the stage where he was deselected and replaced by Sylvia Hermon. Weir was later expelled from the Ulster Unionist Party for refusing to support the re-election of David Trimble as First Minister of Northern Ireland. Following a period as an Independent Unionist, Weir joined the Democratic Unionist Party (DUP) in 2002.

Since then, he has been re-elected to the Northern Ireland Assembly in North Down at each election for the DUP. In the 2005 Westminster election Weir was a DUP candidate for North Down, but lost to Sylvia, Lady Hermon, of the Ulster Unionist Party.

He lost his seat in the 2022 Northern Ireland Assembly election.

He is a former member of the North Down Borough Council.

It was announced on 14 October 2022, that as part of the 2022 Special Honours, Weir would receive a life peerage, sitting for the Democratic Unionist Party. On 16 November 2022, Weir was created Baron Weir of Ballyholme, of Ballyholme in the County of Down.

== Personal life ==
Lord Weir of Ballyholme is a barrister by profession.

He is a member of the Orange Order and the Royal Black Preceptory. He attends Hamilton Road Presbyterian Church.

Weir reported in November 2021 that one of his toes had been amputated as a result of an infection following a type 1 diabetes diagnosis.

Northern Ireland Forum
New forum	Member for North Down; 1996–1998	Forum dissolved
Northern Ireland Assembly
New assembly	MLA for North Down; 1998–2017	Succeeded by Alan Chambers
Preceded by Jonathan Bell	MLA for Strangford; 2017–2022	Succeeded by Nick Mathison
Political offices
Preceded by John O'Dowd	Minister of Education; 2016–2017; 2020–2021	Succeeded by Michelle McIlveen
Orders of precedence in the United Kingdom
Preceded by The Lord Evans of Rainow	Gentlemen; Baron Weir of Ballyholme	Followed by The Lord Jackson of Peterborough
