= Elisha McCallion =

Irish former politician (born 1982)

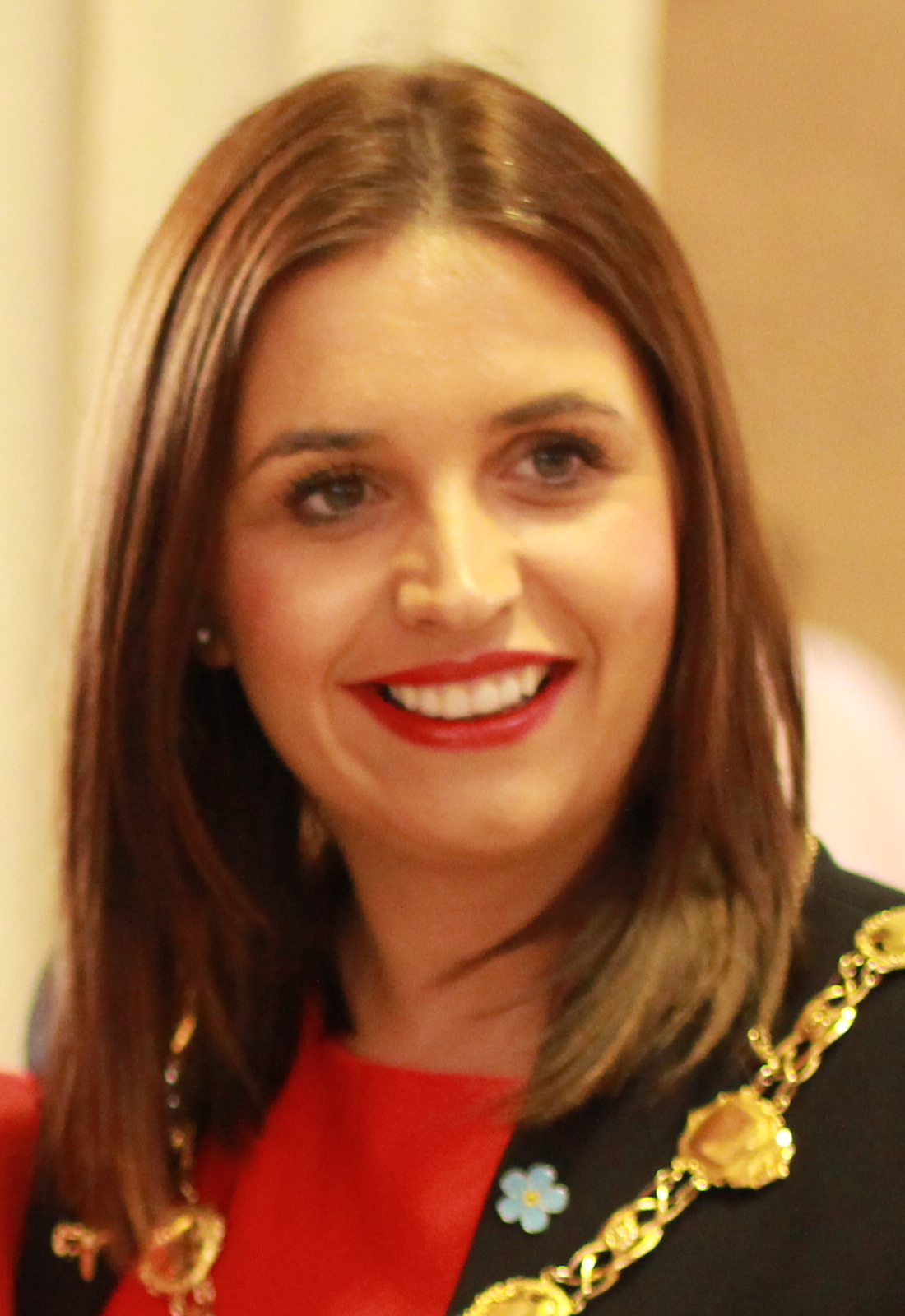
- McCallion in 2015

Senator
- In office 29 June 2020 – 29 October 2020
- Constituency: Industrial and Commercial Panel

Mayor of Derry
- In office 11 March 2015 – 1 May 2016
- Preceded by: Brenda Stevenson
- Succeeded by: Hilary McClintock

Member of Parliament for Foyle
- In office 8 June 2017 – 6 November 2019
- Preceded by: Mark Durkan
- Succeeded by: Colum Eastwood

Member of the Legislative Assembly for Foyle
- In office 2 March 2017 – 8 June 2017
- Preceded by: Martin McGuinness
- Succeeded by: Karen Mullan

Personal details
- Born: Elisha McLaughlin; 21 October 1982 (age 43) Derry, Northern Ireland
- Party: Sinn Féin
- Spouse: Declan McCallion (m. 2009)
- Relations: Martina Anderson (aunt)
- Children: 3
- Education: Ulster University

Elisha McCallion (née McLaughlin; born 21 October 1982) is an Irish former Sinn Féin politician who served as a Senator for the Industrial and Commercial Panel from April 2020 until October 2020. She previously served as Mayor of Derry from 2015 to 2016, a Member of Parliament (MP) for Foyle from 2017 to 2019, and as a Member of the Legislative Assembly (MLA) for Foyle from March to June 2017.

== Early life ==
McLaughlin was born on 21 October 1982 in Galliagh, Derry, Northern Ireland, and grew up there in a republican family; her aunt is Martina Anderson. Her father is a painter and decorator, and her mother is a former bar manager. She has a brother and a sister. McLaughlin attended Galliagh Nursery School, Lenamore Primary School (now St. Therese's Primary School), and Thornhill College in Derry.

She joined Sinn Féin's youth wing Ógra Shinn Féin at the age of 15 and stated that the Drumcree conflict prompted her interest in politics. She went on to study Irish History and Politics at the further education institution North West Regional College, and complete a bachelor's degree in Community Development at Ulster University. Her first job as at the Galliagh Independent Advice Service from which she went on to work for the Galliagh Development Trust and the Galliagh Women's Group.

== Political career ==
McLaughlin was elected as a Sinn Féin councillor for Shantallow on Derry City Council in 2005 aged just 23. She was re-elected in 2011 and in 2015 she became the first Mayor of Derry & Strabane.

McCallion supported the United Kingdom remaining within the European Union (EU) in the 2016 United Kingdom European Union membership referendum. In March 2017, she was elected as a Member of the Legislative Assembly (MLA) for Foyle winning the seat previously held by former deputy First Minister Martin McGuinness. She resigned as an MLA in June to stand as an MP in the 2017 general election.

She became the MP for Foyle following the 2017 general election with a majority of 169 votes. The seat had been represented by former leader of the Social Democratic and Labour Party (SDLP) Mark Durkan since 2005, and had been represented by the founder of the SDLP John Hume prior to this from its formation in 1983. McCallion was the first female MP to represent the constituency. She did not sit in the House of Commons per Sinn Féin's longstanding policy of abstentionism. She was defeated by Colum Eastwood, of the SDLP, in the 2019 general election by a majority of 17,110 (36.3%).

In April 2020, McCallion was elected to the 26th Seanad in the Republic of Ireland, topping the poll on the Industrial and Commercial Panel with 95,000 votes on the first count. In October 2020, it was revealed that three Sinn Féin bank accounts which had erroneously received UK government COVID-19 small business grants had failed to return them promptly. One of the three was for McCallion's former Westminster office, and on 28 October she resigned from the Seanad after accepting she should have acted sooner as she was responsible for the account.

== Personal life ==
McLaughlin married Declan McCallion, a welder, in 2009. She chose to take his surname in 2011. They have three sons together.

Northern Ireland Assembly
Preceded by Martin McGuinness	Member of the Legislative Assembly for Foyle; 2017–2017	Succeeded by Karen Mullan
Parliament of the United Kingdom
Preceded by Mark Durkan	Member of Parliament for Foyle; 2017–2019	Succeeded by Colum Eastwood
