= Nick Mathison =

Alliance Party of Northern Ireland MLA

Nick Mathison MLA
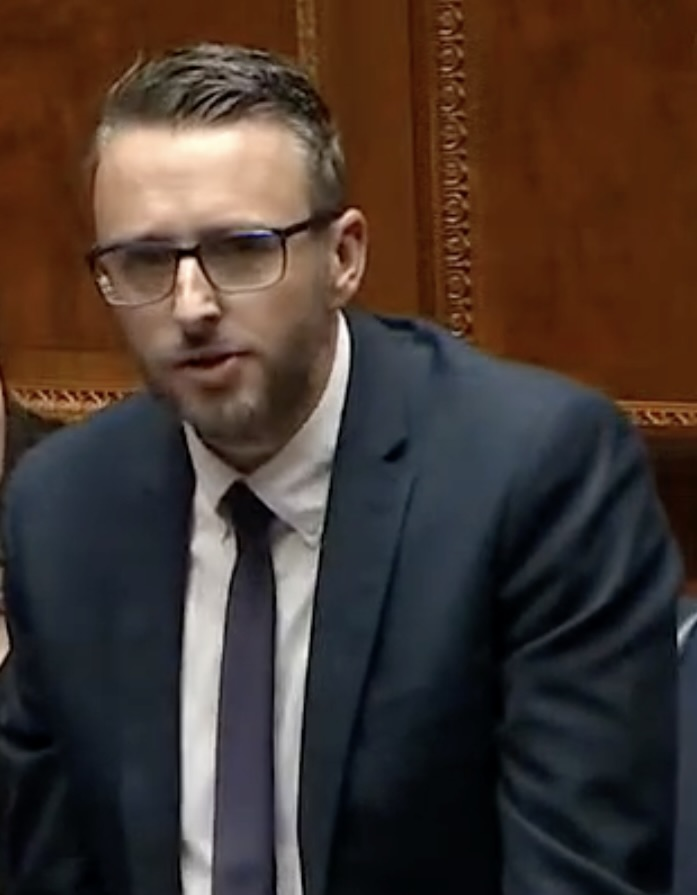
- Mathison in 2022

Member of the Northern Ireland Assembly for Strangford
- Incumbent
- Assumed office 5 May 2022

Member of Ards and North Down Borough Council
- In office 2 May 2019 – 5 May 2022
- Preceded by: Katherine Ferguson
- Succeeded by: Vicky Moore
- Constituency: Newtownards

Personal details
- Party: Alliance
- Occupation: Politician

Nick Mathison is a Northern Irish politician who is an Alliance Party Member of the Legislative Assembly (MLA).

He was elected as an MLA in the 2022 Northern Ireland Assembly election for Strangford.

== Political career ==
He was previously a councillor in Newtownards on Ards and North Down Borough Council

During his election campaign, he promised to promote animal welfare, including a ban on blood sports.
