= Sinéad McLaughlin =

Northern Ireland politician

Sinéad McLaughlin MLA
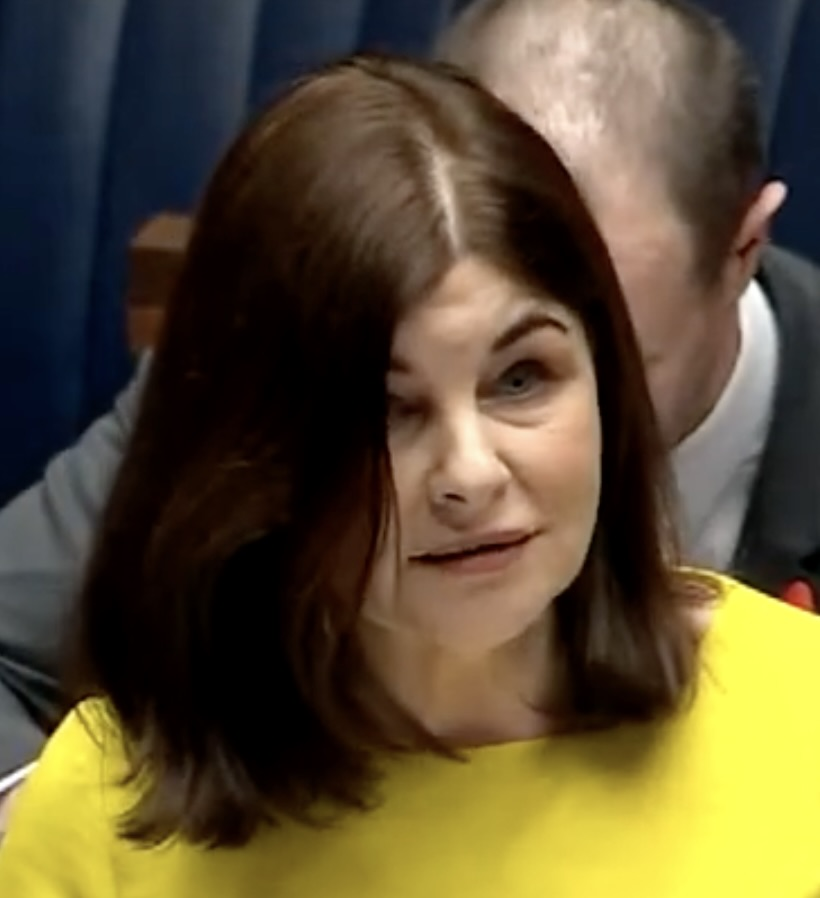

Member of the Legislative Assembly for Foyle
- Incumbent
- Assumed office 10 January 2020
- Preceded by: Colum Eastwood

Member of Derry City and Strabane District Council
- In office 23 November 2018 – 10 January 2020
- Preceded by: Tina Gardiner
- Succeeded by: Sean Mooney
- Constituency: Waterside

Personal details
- Born: January 1963 (age 63) Derry, Northern Ireland
- Party: Social Democratic and Labour Party

Sinéad McLaughlin is a Social Democratic and Labour Party (SDLP) politician who has served as a Member of the Legislative Assembly (MLA) for Foyle since January 2020.

== Background ==
McLaughlin is a former Chief Executive of the Chamber of Commerce in Derry and was a leader of the campaign in Northern Ireland against Brexit.

In November 2018, she was co-opted to Derry City and Strabane District Council as a representative for the Waterside District. She was re-elected at the 2019 election.

In January 2020, McLaughlin was co-opted to the Northern Ireland Assembly to replace Foyle member Colum Eastwood, who was elected MP in the 2019 general election

She has been the SDLP's Spokesperson for the Economy as well as Spokesperson for COVID-19 recovery, the Chair of the Northern Ireland Assembly's Executive Office Committee and the Deputy Chair of the Assembly's Economy Committee.

McLaughlin was re-elected in the 2022 Assembly election. In her role, McLaughlin focuses on jobs and the economy, particularly in Derry, as well as access to affordable childcare and university expansion in Derry.

Northern Ireland Assembly
Preceded by Colum Eastwood	MLA for Foyle; 2020–present	Incumbent
