= Strangford (Assembly constituency) =

Constituency of the Northern Ireland Assembly

Coordinates: 54.456°N 5.543°W

- Northern Ireland Assembly; Parliamentary constituency
- Strangford shown within Northern Ireland

Current constituency
- Created: 1996
- Seats: 6 (1996–2016); 5 (2017–)
- MLAs: Kellie Armstrong (APNI); Harry Harvey (DUP); Nick Mathison (APNI); Michelle McIlveen (DUP); Mike Nesbitt (UUP)
- Districts: Ards and North Down Borough Council

Strangford is a constituency in the Northern Ireland Assembly.

The seat was first used for a Northern Ireland-only election for the Northern Ireland Forum in 1996. Since 1998, it has elected members to the current Assembly.

For Assembly elections before 1996, the constituency was largely part of the North Down constituency with smaller sections being added from Belfast East constituency and Belfast South constituency. From 1997 until 2024, it shared boundaries with the Strangford UK Parliament constituency until the Parliamentary constituency's boundaries changed for the 2024 United Kingdom general election.

For further details of the history and boundaries of the Parliamentary constituency, see Strangford (UK Parliament constituency).

== Members ==
Election	MLA (party)	MLA (party)	MLA (party)	MLA (party)	MLA (party)	MLA (party)
1996	Kieran McCarthy (Alliance Party)	Tom Benson (UUP)	Jim Shannon (DUP)	John Taylor (UUP)	Iris Robinson (DUP)	5 seats 1996–1998
1998	Kieran McCarthy (Alliance Party)	Tom Benson (UUP)	Jim Shannon (DUP)	John Taylor (UUP)	Iris Robinson (DUP)	Cedric Wilson (UKUP)
January 2001 co-option	Kieran McCarthy (Alliance Party)	Tom Hamilton (UUP)	Jim Shannon (DUP)	John Taylor (UUP)	Iris Robinson (DUP)	Cedric Wilson (UKUP)
2003	Kieran McCarthy (Alliance Party)	David McNarry (UUP/UKIP)	Jim Shannon (DUP)	John Taylor (UUP)	Iris Robinson (DUP)	George Ennis (DUP)
2007	Kieran McCarthy (Alliance Party)	David McNarry (UUP/UKIP)	Jim Shannon (DUP)	Simon Hamilton (DUP)	Iris Robinson (DUP)	Michelle McIlveen (DUP)
January 2010 co-option	Kieran McCarthy (Alliance Party)	David McNarry (UUP/UKIP)	Jim Shannon (DUP)	Simon Hamilton (DUP)	Jonathan Bell (DUP)	Michelle McIlveen (DUP)
August 2010 co-option	Kieran McCarthy (Alliance Party)	David McNarry (UUP/UKIP)	Simpson Gibson (DUP)	Simon Hamilton (DUP)	Jonathan Bell (DUP)	Michelle McIlveen (DUP)
2011	Kieran McCarthy (Alliance Party)	David McNarry (UUP/UKIP)	Mike Nesbitt (UUP)	Simon Hamilton (DUP)	Jonathan Bell (DUP)	Michelle McIlveen (DUP)
October 2012 defection	Kieran McCarthy (Alliance Party)	David McNarry (UUP/UKIP)	Mike Nesbitt (UUP)	Simon Hamilton (DUP)	Jonathan Bell (DUP)	Michelle McIlveen (DUP)
2016	Kellie Armstrong (Alliance Party)	Philip Smith (UUP)	Mike Nesbitt (UUP)	Simon Hamilton (DUP)	Jonathan Bell (DUP)	Michelle McIlveen (DUP)
2017	Kellie Armstrong (Alliance Party)	5 seats 2017–present	Mike Nesbitt (UUP)	Simon Hamilton (DUP)	Peter Weir (DUP)	Michelle McIlveen (DUP)
September 2019 co-option	Kellie Armstrong (Alliance Party)	5 seats 2017–present	Mike Nesbitt (UUP)	Harry Harvey (DUP)	Peter Weir (DUP)	Michelle McIlveen (DUP)
2022	Kellie Armstrong (Alliance Party)	5 seats 2017–present	Mike Nesbitt (UUP)	Harry Harvey (DUP)	Nick Mathison (Alliance Party)	Michelle McIlveen (DUP)

Note: The columns in this table are used only for presentational purposes, and no significance should be attached to the order of columns. For details of the order in which seats were won at each election, see the detailed results of that election.

== Elections ==
=== Northern Ireland Assembly ===
==== 2027 ====
2027 Assembly election: Strangford – 5 seats
Party	Candidate	FPv%	Count
Party	Candidate	FPv%	1
Independent	Gareth Burns		
Sinn Féin	Chris Hazzard		
TUV	Jonathan Jackson		
Alliance	Nick Mathison		
Alliance	Vicky Moore		
UUP	Richard Smart		

==== 2022 ====
2022 Assembly election: Strangford – 5 seats
Party	Candidate	FPv%	Count								
Party	Candidate	FPv%	1	2	3	4	5	6	7	8	9
Alliance	**Kellie Armstrong**	17.17%	**7,015**								
DUP	**Michelle McIlveen**	16.15%	6,601	6,643	6,645	6,779	**8,344**				
DUP	**Harry Harvey**	11.51%	4,704	4,728	4,737	4,788	6,140	**7,488**			
UUP	**Mike Nesbitt**	9.04%	3,693	3,763	3,775	5,822	6,034	6,124	6,471	6,478	**6,707**
Alliance	**Nick Mathison**	6.91%	2,822	3,279	3,568	3,670	3,697	3,707	3,735	3,842	**6,174**
TUV	Stephen Cooper	12.69%	5,186	5,233	5,240	5,327	5,502	5,570	5,866	5,868	5,924
SDLP	Conor Houston	5.97%	2,440	2,563	3,715	3,759	3,772	3,778	3,781	3,802	
DUP	Peter Weir	8.12%	3,313	3,330	3,335	3,392					
UUP	Philip Smith	6.20%	2,535	2,556	2,567						
Sinn Féin	Róisé McGivern	3.93%	1,607	1,644							
Green (NI)	Maurice Macartney	2.03%	831								
Ind. Unionist	Ben King	0.29%	118								
Electorate: 70,775 Valid: 40,865 (57.74%) Spoilt: 480 Quota: 6,811 Turnout: 41,345 (58.42%)

==== 2017 ====
2017 Assembly election: Strangford – 5 seats
Party	Candidate	FPv%	Count										
Party	Candidate	FPv%	1	2	3	4	5	6	7	8	9	10	11
Alliance	**Kellie Armstrong**	14.99%	5,813	5,845	6,372	**6,610**							
DUP	**Simon Hamilton**	16.04%	6,221	6,234	6,259	6,262	**6,531**						
DUP	**Michelle McIlveen**	14.77%	5,728	5,737	5,746	5,747	5,963	5,963.75	6,013.25	6,330	**6,762**		
UUP	**Mike Nesbitt**	13.72%	5,323	5,362	5,419	5,432	5,644	5,653	5,657	6,112	**6,540**		
DUP	**Peter Weir**	9.13%	3,543	3,552	3,556	3,556	3,636	3,636	3,639.5	3,877.75	4,191.25	5,101.5	**5,392.38**
SDLP	Joe Boyle	7.85%	3,045	3,049	3,120	3,878	3,900	4,020.75	4,021	4,115	4,229.25	5,163.25	5,167.09
UUP	Philip Smith	6.32%	2,453	2,480	2,507	2,507	2,648	2,648	2,651	2,800	3,079.25		
Independent	Jimmy Menagh	4.19%	1,627	1,634	1,683	1,689	1,842	1,845	1,846.5	2,189.75			
Independent	Jonathan Bell	3.81%	1,479	1,489	1,549	1,578	1,782	1,791.75	1,794				
TUV	Stephen Cooper	3.43%	1,330	1,350	1,370	1,373							
Sinn Féin	Dermot Kennedy	2.86%	1,110	1,110	1,129								
Green (NI)	Ricky Bamford	2.37%	918	930									
NI Conservatives	Scott Benton	0.50%	195										
Electorate: 64,393 Valid: 38,785 (60.23%) Spoilt: 454 Quota: 6,465 Turnout: 39,239 (60.94%)

==== 2016 ====
2016 Assembly election: Strangford – 6 seats
Party	Candidate	FPv%	Count									
Party	Candidate	FPv%	1	2	3	4	5	6	7	8	9	10
UUP	**Mike Nesbitt**	14.32%	**4,673**									
DUP	**Michelle McIlveen**	14.29%	**4,663**									
DUP	**Jonathan Bell**	10.40%	3,393	3,411	3,416	3,517	3,540	3,774	**5,164**			
DUP	**Simon Hamilton**	12.14%	3,964	3,994	3,996	4,099	4,129	4,468	**4,983**			
Alliance	**Kellie Armstrong**	10.72%	3,499	3,563	3,656	3,720	4,313	4,368	4,393	4,412.84	4,643.46	**4,662.46**
UUP	**Philip Smith**	5.19%	1,694	1,805	1,805	1,905	1,963	2,335	2,475	2,904.04	3,676.88	**3,957.88**
SDLP	Joe Boyle	8.35%	2,724	2,738	3,152	3,176	3,276	3,293	3,311	3,320.3	3,367.92	3,387.92
Independent	Jimmy Menagh	5.64%	1,840	1,898	1,905	1,972	2,048	2,249	2,276	2,312.58		
DUP	Harry Harvey	6.18%	2,017	2,031	2,033	2,067	2,072	2,226				
TUV	Stephen Cooper	4.31%	1,407	1,418	1,419	1,590	1,606					
Green (NI)	Georgia Grainger	2.83%	924	946	993	1,043						
UKIP	Stephen Crosby	2.33%	759	796	807							
Sinn Féin	Dermot Kennedy	2.03%	661	662								
NI Conservatives	Bill McKendry	0.96%	314									
Independent	Rab McCartney	0.33%	107									
Electorate: 65,695 Valid: 32,639 (49.68%) Spoilt: 375 Quota: 4,663 Turnout: 33,014 (50.25%)

==== 2011 ====
2011 Assembly election: Strangford – 6 seats
Party	Candidate	FPv%	Count					
Party	Candidate	FPv%	1	2	3	4	5	6
DUP	**Michelle McIlveen**	15.41%	**4,573**					
Alliance	**Kieran McCarthy**	14.44%	**4,284**					
DUP	**Jonathan Bell**	14.38%	**4,265**					
DUP	**Simon Hamilton**	11.65%	3,456	3,672.58	3,778.93	3,960.4	**5,745.4**	
UUP	**Mike Nesbitt**	11.03%	3,273	3,286.93	3,371.93	3,595.28	3,780.92	**4,069.92**
UUP	**David McNarry**	9.35%	2,773	2,790.01	2,875.29	3,076.43	3,259.88	**3,766.88**
SDLP	Joe Boyle	8.51%	2,525	2,527.03	2,579.03	3,245.24	3,281.36	3,308.36
DUP	Billy Walker	7.33%	2,175	2,231.49	2,282.84	2,449.33		
TUV	Terry Williams	2.83%	841	844.01	963.01			
Sinn Féin	Mickey Coogan	3.04%	902	902.28	913.28			
UKIP	Cecil Andrews	2.03%	601	602.4				
Electorate: 62,178 Valid: 29,668 (47.71%) Spoilt: 518 Quota: 4,239 Turnout: 30,186 (48.55%)

==== 2007 ====
2007 Assembly election: Strangford – 6 seats
Party	Candidate	FPv%	Count												
Party	Candidate	FPv%	1	2	3	4	5	6	7	8	9	10	11	12	13
DUP	**Iris Robinson**	16.43%	**5,917**												
DUP	**Jim Shannon**	13.29%	4,788	5,013.68	5,085.46	5,119.59	5,138.02	**5,178.02**							
Alliance	**Kieran McCarthy**	11.34%	4,085	4,095.92	4,110.31	4,206.57	4,255.09	4,418.48	4,540.74	4,689.74	**5,206.74**				
UUP	**David McNarry**	10.30%	3,709	3,737.08	3,754.08	3,842.08	4,110.6	4,204.12	4,356.51	4,360.51	4,469.29	**6,036.29**			
DUP	**Simon Hamilton**	10.80%	3,889	3,959.85	3,975.85	4,002.37	4,026.32	4,059.36	4,284.79	4,286.79	4,359.83	4,663.73	4,982.73	4,986.73	**4,997.73**
DUP	**Michelle McIlveen**	9.63%	3,468	3,858.91	3,887.69	3,903.95	3,932.99	4,002.37	4,148.06	4,149.06	4,215.23	4,377.39	4,560.39	4,568.39	**4,579.39**
SDLP	Joe Boyle	8.52%	3,068	3,068.78	3,071.78	3,082.78	3,096.04	3,122.3	3,132.3	3,937.43	4,088.56	4,294.34	4,512.34	4,547.34	4,548.34
UUP	Angus Carson	5.91%	2,128	2,138.27	2,157.66	2,207.79	2,487.22	2,571.74	2,723.26	2,733.26	2,818.65				
Green (NI)	Stephanie Sim	2.41%	868	871.64	887.77	942.16	951.16	1,092.55	1,166.81	1,251.81					
Sinn Féin	Dermot Kennedy	3.02%	1,089	1,089.13	1,089.13	1,090.13	1,095.13	1,099.13	1,099.13						
UK Unionist	George Ennis	2.42%	872	876.16	953.68	987.94	998.2	1,039.33							
Independent	Martin Gregg	1.80%	650	657.15	676.28	724.28	733.28								
UUP	Michael Henderson	1.87%	675	682.67	686.67	719.67									
NI Conservatives	Robert Little	1.41%	508	509.95	518.08										
Ind. Unionist	Cedric Wilson	0.85%	305	308.77											
Electorate: 66,648 Valid: 36,019 (54.04%) Spoilt: 321 Quota: 5,146 Turnout: 36,340 (54.53%)

==== 2003 ====
2003 Assembly election: Strangford – 6 seats
Party	Candidate	FPv%	Count										
Party	Candidate	FPv%	1	2	3	4	5	6	7	8	9	10	11
DUP	**Iris Robinson**	22.95%	**8,548**										
UUP	**John Taylor**	15.19%	**5,658**										
DUP	**George Ennis**	12.37%	4,606	**6,138.54**									
DUP	**Jim Shannon**	12.63%	4,703	**6,105.67**									
UUP	**David McNarry**	8.05%	3,000	3,055.5	3,169.46	3,304.1	3,394.34	3,413.81	3,449.14	3,589.01	3,884.5	**5,610.5**	
Alliance	**Kieran McCarthy**	7.36%	2,741	2,763.57	2,791.32	2,835.87	2,847.03	2,968.36	3,146.42	3,211.03	3,612.93	4,232.62	**4,451.48**
SDLP	Joe Boyle	7.80%	2,906	2,909.33	2,910.07	2,916.01	2,920.69	2,990.39	3,047.13	3,072.1	3,950.67	4,093.71	4,160.05
UUP	Bob Little	5.70%	2,123	2,172.21	2,372.01	2,594.76	2,813.28	2,834.38	2,893.98	3,063.46	3,377.83		
Sinn Féin	Dermot Kennedy	2.97%	1,105	1,106.11	1,107.59	1,110.89	1,111.61	1,172.61	1,186.35	1,189.05			
NI Unionist	Cedric Wilson	1.55%	576	618.55	983.74	1,265.89	1,269.67	1,277.54	1,314.82	1,425.63			
PUP	Colin Neill	1.45%	540	558.87	620.29	668.8	672.16	676.01	697.1				
Green (NI)	Philip Orr	1.14%	425	437.58	461.63	482.75	483.77	501.97					
Independent	Danny McCarthy	0.86%	319	320.48	335.65	349.51	351.61						
Electorate: 66,308 Valid: 37,250 (56.18%) Spoilt: 588 Quota: 5,322 Turnout: 37,838 (57.06%)

==== 1998 ====
1998 Assembly election: Strangford – 6 seats
Party	Candidate	FPv%	Count																	
Party	Candidate	FPv%	1	2	3	4	5	6	7	8	9	10	11	12	13	14	15	16	17	18
DUP	**Iris Robinson**	22.08%	**9,479**																	
UUP	**John Taylor**	21.44%	**9,203**																	
UUP	**Tom Benson**	3.78%	1,623	1,638.75	2,222.19	2,222.19	2,231.52	2,240.52	2,257.2	2,297.84	2,319.76	2,545.66	3,010	3,072.33	3,252.96	3,257.99	4,599.04	4,719.41	**6,327.41**	
Alliance	**Kieran McCarthy**	6.87%	2,947	2,953.65	3,043.41	3,043.41	3,076.41	3,131.76	3,159.76	3,184.09	3,259.79	3,307.09	3,353.93	3,366.71	3,546.30	3,661.29	3,796.85	6,095.15	**6,202.15**	
DUP	**Jim Shannon**	3.30%	1,415	3,682.3	3,742.03	3,743.03	3,750.08	3,755.08	3,777.87	3,795.62	3,827.21	3,971.23	3,995.87	5,141.05	5,267.1	5,271.45	5,403.97	5,435.41	5,862.79	**5,932.54**
UK Unionist	**Cedric Wilson**	7.17%	3,078	3,350.65	3,502.78	3,506.44	3,513.12	3,521.47	3,540.49	3,573.14	3,593.55	3,699.24	3,740.23	3,871.12	3,978.89	3,981.59	4,141.92	4,178.61	4,720.04	**4,804.04**
SDLP	Danny McCarthy	4.62%	1,982	1,985.85	2,001.36	2,001.36	2,004.36	2,014.36	2,020.69	2,027.37	2,364.06	2,376.71	2,385.03	2,393.41	2,430.42	4,282.09	4,315.01	4,439.28	4,609.97	4,644.97
Ind. Unionist	John Beattie	5.24%	2,247	2,280.95	2,682.89	2,685.22	2,686.55	2,698.89	2,706.59	2,753.97	2,783.64	2,880.32	3,081.28	3,171.91	3,422.55	3,438.2	3,965.4	4,087.26		
Alliance	Peter Osborne	5.29%	2,269	2,276	2,391.5	2,394.5	2,434.82	2,465.82	2,480.82	2,495.8	2,513.81	2,556.11	2,604.2	2,615.69	2,783.24	2,850.88	2,982.86			
UUP	David McNarry	2.50%	1,073	1,103.8	1,947.61	1,948.94	1,962.3	1,969.3	1,978.28	1,994.93	2,042.56	2,138.23	2,431.45	2,477.3	2,771.54	2,782.21				
SDLP	Brian Hanvey	4.39%	1,883	1,884.4	1,891.66	1,892.66	1,898.99	1,914.34	1,916.34	1,920.34	2,092	2,097.35	2,107.99	2,108.34	2,124.69					
PUP	Ricky Johnston	3.13%	1,342	1,362.3	1,428.63	1,429.63	1,446.64	1,458.64	1,468.63	1,477.33	1,593.42	1,662.44	1,715.34	1,778.87						
DUP	Tommy Jeffers	2.35%	1,007	1,544.95	1,564.75	1,564.75	1,568.5	1,570.85	1,580.26	1,593.62	1,624.06	1,677.28	1,713.68							
UUP	Tom Hamilton	1.43%	615	628.3	1,094.26	1,095.59	1,101.24	1,109.24	1,119.91	1,146.92	1,184.78	1,316.63								
Ind. Unionist	Wilbert McGill	2.22%	951	975.15	1,060.95	1,060.95	1,068.63	1,075.98	1,125.33	1,147	1,167.36									
Sinn Féin	Paddy McGreevy	1.43%	614	614	614.33	614.33	615.66	618.66	619.99	619.99										
Ulster Democratic	Blakely McNally	0.75%	322	348.25	391.81	391.81	393.14	394.14	400.19	410.52										
NI Conservatives	Thomas Beattie	0.61%	263	270.7	292.15	292.15	298.15	302.15	312.48											
Independent	Nancy Orr	0.47%	201	210.1	223.63	223.63	235.96	255.31												
Green (NI)	Andrew Frew	0.47%	200	203.15	204.14	217.14	233.14													
Labour Party NI	Jonathan Stewart	0.42%	181	186.95	195.86	196.86														
Natural Law	Sarah Mullins	0.06%	27	27	28.65															
Electorate: 70,868 Valid: 42,922 (60.57%) Spoilt: 729 Quota: 6,132 Turnout: 43,651 (61.59%)

=== 1996 forum ===
Successful candidates are shown in bold.

Party	Candidates	Votes	Percentage
UUP	**John Taylor**; **Tom Benson**; William Biggerstaff; Jack Beattie	12,547	31.3
DUP	**Iris Robinson**; **Jim Shannon**; Sandy Geddis; William Morrison	11,584	28.9
Alliance	**Kieran McCarthy**; Geraldine Rice; Kathleen Coulter; Jim McBriar; Alan McDowell	4,614	11.6
UK Unionist	Cedric Wilson; Elizabeth Roche	3,112	7.8
SDLP	John Moffat; Joanne Murphy	2,927	7.3
PUP	Georgina McCrory; Alfred McCrory	2,017	5.0
Ulster Democratic	James McCurrie; Blakely McNally	1,080	2.7
Sinn Féin	Garret O'Fachtna; Patrick McGreevy	709	1.8
NI Women's Coalition	Donna Davis; Victoria Moore; Gerry Gribben; Miriam Titterton	410	1.0
NI Conservatives	Thomas Beattie; Duncan Shipley-Dalton	380	0.9
Green (NI)	David Langley; Robert Huey; Sue Miles	213	0.5
Labour coalition	Andrew Snoddy; Stephen Baker	202	0.5
Workers' Party	Tom Devlin; Colum Feenan	73	0.2
Independent Voice	Edward Philips; Trevor Richards	66	0.2
Ulster Independence	Joyce Cowden; Francis Hynds	57	0.1
Democratic Left	Deidre Dunphy; Imelda Hynds	53	0.1
Independent Chambers	Pearl Brown; Heather Magowan	13	0.0
Natural Law	Christine Bowen; Lewis Walch	13	0.0
