= Peter Ingram Weir =

Scottish artist (1864–1943)

Peter Ingram Weir (1864–1943) was a Scottish artist noted for his watercolour paintings of Scottish landscapes.

He exhibited at the Royal Scottish Academy and the Royal Institute of Painters in Watercolours between 1885 and 1888.

His best known work is perhaps his pair of watercolours depicting Granton Pier in the late 19th century, which were discovered in a second hand shop in Australia before being sold at Shapes auction house, Edinburgh in 2013.
