= Kellie Armstrong =

British politician (born 1970)

Kellie Armstrong MLA
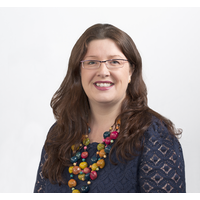

Member of the Northern Ireland Assembly for Strangford
- Incumbent
- Assumed office 6 May 2016
- Preceded by: Kieran McCarthy

Member of Ards and North Down Borough Council
- In office 22 May 2014 – 5 May 2016
- Preceded by: Council established
- Succeeded by: Lorna McAlpine
- Constituency: Ards Peninsula

Personal details
- Born: Kellie McGrattan; 8 September 1970 (age 55) Newtownards, County Down, Northern Ireland
- Party: Alliance
- Education: Queen's University Belfast
- Occupation: Politician
- Website: Official website

Kellie Armstrong (née McGrattan; 8 September 1970) is an Alliance Party politician from Northern Ireland. She has been a Member of the Legislative Assembly (MLA), the Northern Ireland Assembly, for the Strangford constituency since the 2016 Assembly elections.

== Political career ==
Armstrong has been an active member of the Alliance Party since 2009. She has held various positions within the Alliance Party including: secretary and chair of the Strangford Association branch, convenor of the Political Organisation – a committee of the Party Executive that oversees election and activist activities, member of the Party Executive, a member of the Alliance Women's Group, a founder member of Alliance Ability Group and Vice Chair of the Party.

=== Councillor (2013–2016) ===
Armstrong was co-opted onto Ards Borough Council to replace retiring member Kieran McCarthy. She was then elected in 2014 to Ards and North Down Borough Council representing the Ards Peninsula.

=== Member of the Legislative Assembly (2016–present) ===
Armstrong stood as the Alliance Westminster candidate in 2015 and 2019 securing the highest-ever vote for an Alliance representative in the Strangford constituency.

Armstrong was elected to the Northern Ireland Assembly in 2016, 2017 and again in 2022 when she was the first person elected in NI and topped the poll in Strangford.

Armstrong sits on the Committee for Communities and holds to account the department's actions with respect to housing, benefits, social strategies, Arts, Heritage and Sport. She is also the Alliance Chair of the Committee on Procedures that reviews and updates the Standing Orders of the Northern Ireland Assembly.

Armstrong is an advocate of Integrated education and successfully delivered the Integrated Education Act via a private member's bill. The Act places a statutory duty on the Department for Education to protect and promote of integrated education across Northern Ireland.

Armstrong is the current Chair of the All Party Group on Homelessness and sits on the following APGs: Housing, Disability, Learning Disability, Fuel Poverty, Carers, Social Enterprise and Women's Health.

== Career before politics ==
For almost a decade, Armstrong was the Northern Ireland Director of the Community Transport Association (CTA). She gave legal and technical advice to organisations and government on transport legislation and passenger transport operations. Armstrong provided business development and governance advice for over 150 community organisations to enable better delivery of accessible transport services.

Prior to Community Transport Association, Armstrong managed Peninsula Community Transport and North Belfast Community Transport. She also worked in Client Services in AndersonSprattGroup, Advertising Sales in Downtown Radio and Cool FM, and as a media buyer in GCAS Advertising. Armstrong also worked with NI Chest Heart and Stroke and NI Mother and Baby Appeal (now Tiny Life).

== Personal life ==
Armstrong is married and has one daughter who attended integrated education. She is a carer for a family member.

Armstrong has moderate hearing loss and is an active campaigner for disability rights.

She lives on a wildlife reserve on the Ards Peninsula, part of the constituency of Strangford.

Northern Ireland Assembly
Preceded by Kieran McCarthy	MLA for Strangford; 2016–present	Incumbent
