= Harry Harvey (politician) =

Democratic Unionist Party (DUP) politician

Harry Harvey MLA
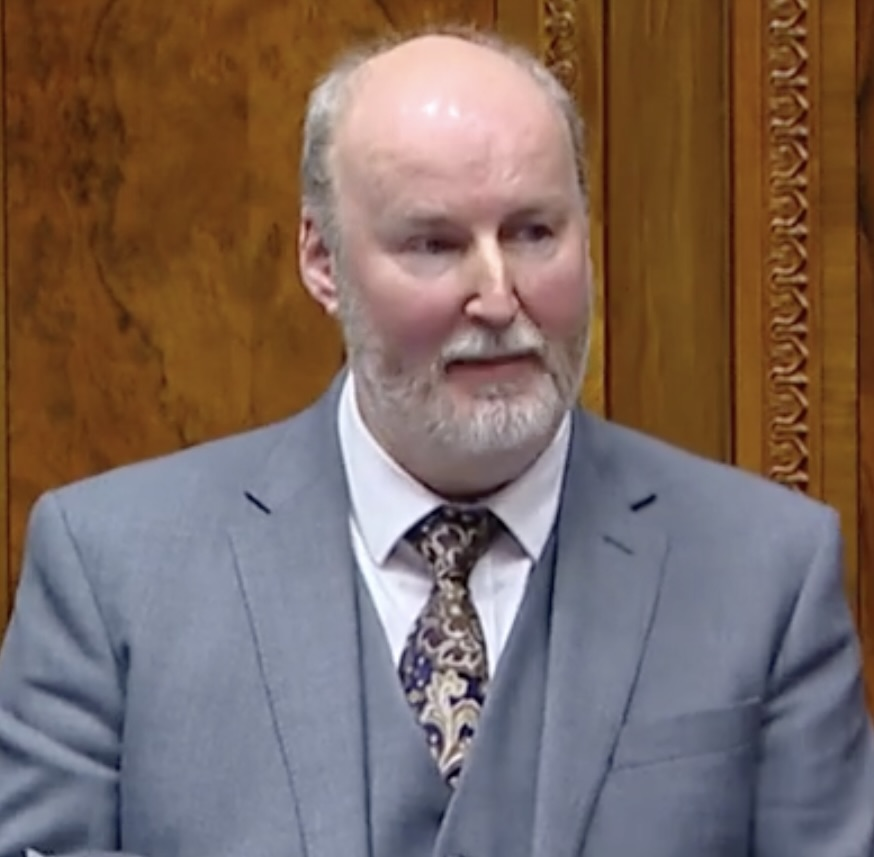
- Harvey in 2021

Member of the Northern Ireland Assembly for Strangford
- Incumbent
- Assumed office 7 September 2019
- Preceded by: Simon Hamilton

Member of Newry, Mourne and Down District Council
- In office 22 May 2014 – 7 September 2019
- Preceded by: William Dick
- Succeeded by: Kathryn Owen
- Constituency: Rowallane

Personal details
- Born: Crossgar, Northern Ireland
- Party: Democratic Unionist Party
- Website: Harry Harvey MLA

Harry Harvey is a Democratic Unionist Party (DUP) politician, serving as a Member of the Northern Ireland Assembly (MLA) for Strangford since 2019. He is the DUP Spokesperson for Cultural Development and Loyal Orders and Groups Engagement. He was a Newry, Mourne and Down Councillor for the Rowallane DEA from 2014 to 2019.

== Background ==
Born in Crossgar, Harvey is the son of politician Cecil Harvey. He worked at Bells Crossgar Motors for twenty years.

At the 2014 Northern Ireland local elections, Harvey was elected to represent the Rowallane area on Newry and Mourne District Council, and was later re-elected in 2019. In September 2019, he was co-opted to represent the Strangford constituency in the Northern Ireland Assembly, replacing Simon Hamilton.

Northern Ireland Assembly
Preceded by Simon Hamilton	MLA for Strangford; 2019–present	Incumbent
