= Pádraig Delargy =

Sinn Féin politician

Pádraig Delargy MLA
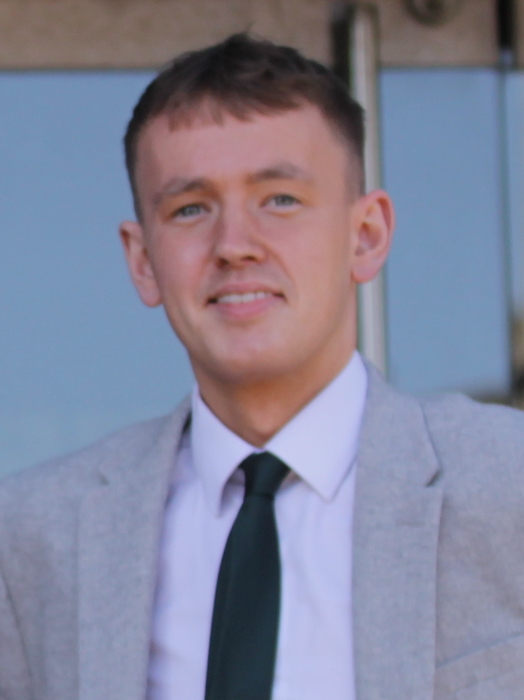
- Delargy in 2021

Member of the Northern Ireland Assembly for Foyle
- Incumbent
- Assumed office 13 September 2021
- Preceded by: Karen Mullan

Personal details
- Born: 1996 (age 29–30) Derry, Northern Ireland
- Party: Sinn Féin
- Education: Queen's University Belfast; Ulster University
- Profession: Teacher

Pádraig Delargy (born 1996) is an Irish Sinn Féin politician who has served as a Member of the Legislative Assembly for Foyle since 2021.

Delargy became the MLA for Foyle following a selection convention held by Sinn Féin after his predecessor Karen Mullan was forced to step down following an internal review by the party.

Prior to becoming an MLA, Delargy was a teacher based in Derry. He went to Queen’s University for his undergraduate and Ulster University for his Postgraduate Certificate in Education.

On 13 February 2026, he announced he would stand down at the next Northern Ireland Assembly election.
