= Committee for Health =

The Committee for Health is a Northern Ireland Assembly committee established to advise, assist and scrutinise the work of the Department of Health and Minister of Health (currently Mike Nesbitt). The committee also plays a key role in the consultation, consideration and development of new legislation.

Until 2016, the committee was called the Committee for Health, Social Services and Public Safety.

== Membership ==
Membership of the Committee is as follows.

Party	Member	Constituency
Sinn Féin	Philip McGuigan MLA (Chairperson)	North Antrim
Alliance	Danny Donnelly MLA (Deputy Chairperson)	East Antrim
UUP	Alan Chambers MLA	North Down
Sinn Féin	Linda Dillon MLA	Mid Ulster
DUP	Diane Dodds MLA	Upper Bann
Sinn Féin	Órlaithí Flynn MLA	Belfast West
Alliance	Nuala McAllister MLA	Belfast North
SDLP	Colin McGrath MLA	South Down
DUP	Alan Robinson MLA	East Londonderry

== 2022–2027 Assembly ==
The committee met for the first time in the 2022–2027 Assembly on 15 February 2024.

Party	Member	Constituency
Sinn Féin	Liz Kimmins MLA (Chairperson)	Newry and Armagh
Alliance	Danny Donnelly MLA (Deputy Chairperson)	East Antrim
UUP	Alan Chambers MLA	North Down
Sinn Féin	Linda Dillon MLA	Mid Ulster
DUP	Diane Dodds MLA	Upper Bann
Sinn Féin	Órlaithí Flynn MLA	Belfast West
Alliance	Nuala McAllister MLA	Belfast North
SDLP	Colin McGrath MLA	South Down
DUP	Alan Robinson MLA	East Londonderry

=== Changes 2022–2027 ===
Date	Outgoing member and party	Constituency	→	New member and party	Constituency
3 February 2025	Liz Kimmins MLA (Sinn Féin)	Newry and Armagh	→	Philip McGuigan MLA (Sinn Féin)	North Antrim

== 2017–2022 Assembly ==
The committee met for the first time in the 2017–2022 Assembly on 23 January 2020.

Party	Member	Constituency
Sinn Féin	Colm Gildernew MLA (Chairperson)	Fermanagh and South Tyrone
DUP	Pam Cameron MLA (Deputy Chairperson)	South Antrim
SDLP	Sinéad Bradley MLA	South Down
Alliance	Paula Bradshaw MLA	Belfast South
People Before Profit	Gerry Carroll MLA	Belfast West
Sinn Féin	Jemma Dolan MLA	Fermanagh and South Tyrone
DUP	Alex Easton MLA	North Down
Sinn Féin	Órlaithí Flynn MLA	Belfast West
UUP	John Stewart MLA	East Antrim

=== Changes 2017–2022 ===
Date	Outgoing member and party	Constituency	→	New member and party	Constituency
10 February 2020	John Stewart MLA (UUP)	East Antrim	→	Alan Chambers MLA (UUP)	North Down
23 March 2020	Sinéad Bradley MLA (SDLP)	South Down	→	Colin McGrath MLA (SDLP)	South Down
16 March 2020	Jemma Dolan MLA (Sinn Féin)	Fermanagh and South Tyrone	→	Pat Sheehan MLA (Sinn Féin)	Belfast West
2 November 2020	Alex Easton MLA (DUP)	North Down	→	Jonathan Buckley MLA (DUP)	Upper Bann
14 December 2020	Colin McGrath MLA (SDLP)	South Down	→	Cara Hunter MLA (SDLP)	East Londonderry
1 February 2021	Pat Sheehan MLA (Sinn Féin)	Belfast West	→	Carál Ní Chuilín MLA (Sinn Féin)	Belfast North
21 June 2021	Pam Cameron MLA (Deputy Chairperson, DUP)	South Antrim	→	Gordon Lyons MLA (Deputy Chairperson, DUP)	Upper Bann
7 July 2021	Gordon Lyons MLA (Deputy Chairperson, DUP)	Upper Bann	→	Pam Cameron MLA (Deputy Chairperson, DUP)	South Antrim
18 October 2021	Cara Hunter MLA (SDLP)	East Londonderry	→	Colin McGrath MLA (SDLP)	South Down
1 November 2021	Jonathan Buckley MLA (DUP)	Upper Bann	→	Deborah Erskine MLA (DUP)	Fermanagh and South Tyrone

== 2016–2017 Assembly ==
The committee met for the first time in the 2016–2017 Assembly on 2 June 2016.

Party	Member	Constituency
DUP	Paula Bradley MLA (Chairperson)	Belfast North
DUP	Gary Middleton MLA (Deputy Chairperson)	Foyle
Alliance	Paula Bradshaw MLA	Belfast South
UUP	Robbie Butler MLA	Lagan Valley
People Before Profit	Gerry Carroll MLA	Belfast West
DUP	Trevor Clarke MLA	South Antrim
UUP	Jo-Anne Dobson MLA	Upper Bann
SDLP	Mark H. Durkan MLA	Foyle
Sinn Féin	Barry McElduff MLA	West Tyrone
Sinn Féin	Daithí McKay MLA	North Antrim
Sinn Féin	Catherine Seeley MLA	Upper Bann

=== Changes 2016–2017 ===
Date	Outgoing member and party	Constituency	→	New member and party	Constituency
20 June 2016	Barry McElduff MLA (Sinn Féin)	West Tyrone	→	Pat Sheehan MLA (Sinn Féin)	West Belfast
18 August 2016	Daithí McKay MLA (Sinn Féin)	North Antrim	→	Vacant	
12 September 2016	Vacant		→	Ian Milne MLA (Sinn Féin)	Mid Ulster

== 2011–2016 Assembly ==
The committee met for the first time in the 2011–2016 Assembly on 25 May 2011.

Party	Member	Constituency
Sinn Féin	Michelle Gildernew MLA (Chairperson)	Fermanagh and South Tyrone
DUP	Jim Wells MLA (Deputy Chairperson)	South Down
Sinn Féin	Michaela Boyle MLA	West Tyrone
DUP	Paula Bradley MLA	Belfast North
Sinn Féin	Mickey Brady MLA	Newry and Armagh
DUP	Gordon Dunne MLA	North Down
SDLP	Mark H. Durkan MLA	Foyle
UUP	Sam Gardiner MLA	Upper Bann
DUP	Pam Lewis MLA	South Antrim
UUP	John McCallister MLA	South Down
Alliance	Kieran McCarthy MLA	Strangford

=== Changes 2011–2016 ===
Date	Outgoing member and party	Constituency	→	New member and party	Constituency
23 January 2012	Michaela Boyle MLA (Sinn Féin)	West Tyrone	→	Sue Ramsey MLA (Sinn Féin)	Belfast West
6 February 2012	Sue Ramsey MLA (Sinn Féin)	Belfast West	→	Sue Ramsey MLA (Chairperson, Sinn Féin)	Belfast West
6 February 2012	Michelle Gildernew MLA (Chairperson, Sinn Féin)	Fermanagh and South Tyrone	→	Michelle Gildernew MLA (Sinn Féin)	Fermanagh and South Tyrone
23 April 2012	Mark H. Durkan MLA (SDLP)	Foyle	→	Conall McDevitt MLA (SDLP)	Belfast South
2 July 2012	Michelle Gildernew MLA (Sinn Féin)	Fermanagh and South Tyrone	→	Vacant	
10 September 2012	Vacant		→	Maeve McLaughlin MLA (Sinn Féin)	Foyle
15 October 2012	John McCallister MLA (UUP)	South Down	→	Roy Beggs Jr MLA (UUP)	East Antrim
4 September 2013	Conall McDevitt MLA (SDLP)	Belfast South	→	Vacant	
16 September 2013	Paula Bradley MLA (DUP)	Belfast North	→	David McIlveen MLA (DUP)	North Antrim
16 September 2013	Sue Ramsey MLA (Chairperson, Sinn Féin)	Belfast West	→	Maeve McLaughlin MLA (Chairperson, Sinn Féin)	Foyle
30 September 2013	Vacant		→	Fearghal McKinney MLA (SDLP)	Belfast South
4 July 2014	Sam Gardiner MLA (UUP)	Upper Bann	→	Jo-Anne Dobson MLA (UUP)	Upper Bann
23 September 2014	Jim Wells MLA (Deputy Chairperson, DUP)	South Down	→	Paula Bradley MLA (Deputy Chairperson, DUP)	Belfast North
6 October 2014	Vacant		→	Rosie McCorley MLA (Sinn Féin)	Belfast West
6 October 2014	David McIlveen MLA (DUP)	North Antrim	→	George Robinson MLA (DUP)	East Londonderry
6 October 2014	Roy Beggs Jr MLA (UUP)	East Antrim	→	Michael McGimpsey MLA (UUP)	Belfast South
1 December 2014	Gordon Dunne MLA (DUP)	North Down	→	Paul Givan MLA (DUP)	Lagan Valley
11 May 2015	Paula Bradley MLA (Deputy Chairperson, DUP)	Belfast North	→	Alex Easton MLA (Deputy Chairperson, DUP)	North Down
3 June 2015	Mickey Brady MLA (Sinn Féin)	Newry and Armagh	→	Vacant	
14 September 2015	Vacant		→	Daithí McKay MLA (Sinn Féin)	North Antrim
5 October 2015	Thomas Buchanan MLA (DUP)	West Tyrone	→	Paul Givan MLA (DUP)	Lagan Valley
9 November 2015	George Robinson MLA (DUP)	East Londonderry	→	Gary Middleton MLA (DUP)	Foyle

== 2007–2011 Assembly ==
The committee met for the first time in the 2007–2011 Assembly on 17 May 2007.

Party	Member	Constituency
DUP	Iris Robinson MLA (Chairperson)	Strangford
Sinn Féin	Michelle O'Neill MLA (Deputy Chairperson)	Mid Ulster
DUP	Thomas Buchanan MLA	West Tyrone
UUP	Robert Coulter MLA	North Antrim
Independent	Kieran Deeny MLA	West Tyrone
DUP	Alex Easton MLA	North Down
SDLP	Tommy Gallagher MLA	Fermanagh and South Tyrone
SDLP	Carmel Hanna MLA	Belfast South
UUP	John McCallister MLA	South Down
Sinn Féin	Carál Ní Chuilín MLA	Belfast North
Sinn Féin	Sue Ramsey MLA	Belfast West

=== Changes 2007–2011 ===
Date	Outgoing member and party	Constituency	→	New member and party	Constituency
20 May 2008	Carál Ní Chuilín MLA (Sinn Féin)	Belfast North	→	Claire McGill MLA (Sinn Féin)	West Tyrone
15 September 2008	Robert Coulter MLA (UUP)	North Antrim	→	Sam Gardiner MLA (UUP)	Upper Bann
29 June 2009	Tommy Gallagher MLA (SDLP)	Fermanagh and South Tyrone	→	Dolores Kelly MLA (SDLP)	Upper Bann
4 July 2009	Iris Robinson MLA (Chairperson, DUP)	Strangford	→	Jim Wells MLA (Chairperson, DUP)	South Down
14 September 2009	Thomas Buchanan MLA (DUP)	West Tyrone	→	Iris Robinson MLA (DUP)	Strangford
12 January 2010	Iris Robinson MLA (DUP)	Strangford	→	Vacant	
15 January 2010	Carmel Hanna MLA (SDLP)	Belfast South	→	Vacant	
26 January 2010	Vacant		→	Conall McDevitt MLA (SDLP)	Belfast South
1 February 2010	Vacant		→	Thomas Buchanan MLA (DUP)	West Tyrone
24 May 2010	Conall McDevitt MLA (SDLP)	Belfast South	→	Tommy Gallagher MLA (SDLP)	Fermanagh and South Tyrone
24 May 2010	Dolores Kelly MLA (SDLP)	Upper Bann	→	Mary Bradley MLA (SDLP)	Foyle
13 September 2010	Thomas Buchanan MLA (DUP)	West Tyrone	→	Paul Girvan MLA (DUP)	South Antrim
13 September 2010	Claire McGill MLA (Sinn Féin)	West Tyrone	→	Mickey Brady MLA (Sinn Féin)	Newry and Armagh
22 November 2010	Mary Bradley MLA (SDLP)	Foyle	→	Pól Callaghan MLA (SDLP)	Foyle

== 1998-2003 Assembly ==
The committee met for the first time in the 1998-2003 Assembly on 30 November 1999.

Party	Member	Constituency
SDLP	Joe Hendron MLA (Chairperson)	Belfast West
SDLP	Tommy Gallagher MLA (Deputy Chairperson)	Fermanagh and South Tyrone
DUP	Paul Berry MLA	Newry and Armagh
UUP	Joan Carson MLA	Fermanagh and South Tyrone
SDLP	Carmel Hanna MLA	Belfast South
Sinn Féin	John Kelly MLA	Mid Ulster
UUP	Alan McFarland MLA	North Down
NI Women's Coalition	Monica McWilliams MLA	Belfast South
Sinn Féin	Sue Ramsey MLA	Belfast West
DUP	Iris Robinson MLA	Strangford

=== Changes 1998-2003 ===
Date	Outgoing member and party	Constituency	→	New member and party	Constituency
11 September 2000	Joan Carson MLA (UUP)	Fermanagh and South Tyrone	→	Robert Coulter MLA (UUP)	North Antrim
21 January 2002	Carmel Hanna MLA (SDLP)	Belfast South	→	Annie Courtney MLA (SDLP)	Foyle
11 March 2002	Alan McFarland MLA (UUP)	North Down	→	Tom Hamilton MLA (UUP)	Strangford

== See also ==
- Committee
