= Northern Ireland Assembly Committee on Procedures =

The Northern Ireland Assembly Committee on Procedures is appointed by the Northern Ireland Assembly to consider and review the Standing Orders and procedures of the Assembly.

== History ==
The committee was created in 1999 following the Belfast Agreement. The committee considers the procedures of the Assembly and its standing orders. Inquiries previously carried out by the committee includes the use of members statements, Legislative Consent Motions, Private Members' Bills and proxy voting.

== Membership ==
Membership of the committee is as follows:

Party	Member	Constituency
Alliance	Kellie Armstrong MLA (chairperson)	Strangford
Sinn Féin	Órlaithí Flynn MLA (deputy chairperson)	Belfast West
DUP	Cheryl Brownlee MLA	East Antrim
UUP	Robbie Butler MLA	Lagan Valley
DUP	Trevor Clarke MLA	South Antrim
Alliance	Danny Donnelly MLA	East Antrim
Sinn Féin	Aoife Finnegan MLA	Newry and Armagh
SDLP	Cara Hunter MLA	East Londonderry
Sinn Féin	Maolíosa McHugh MLA	West Tyrone

== 2022-2027 Mandate ==
Party	Member	Constituency
Alliance	Kellie Armstrong MLA (chairperson)	Strangford
Sinn Féin	Sinéad Ennis MLA (deputy chairperson)	South Down
DUP	Trevor Clarke MLA	South Antrim
Alliance	Danny Donnelly MLA	East Antrim
Sinn Féin	Órlaithí Flynn MLA	Belfast West
Sinn Féin	Maolíosa McHugh MLA	West Tyrone
DUP	Gary Middleton MLA	Foyle
SDLP	Matthew O'Toole MLA	Belfast South
UUP	John Stewart MLA	East Antrim

=== Changes 2022–2027 ===
Date	Outgoing member and party	Constituency	→	New member and party	Constituency
8 April 2024	Gary Middleton MLA (DUP)	Foyle	→	William Irwin MLA (DUP)	Newry and Armagh
28 May 2024	Matthew O'Toole MLA (SDLP)	Belfast South	→	Cara Hunter MLA (SDLP)	East Londonderry
3 February 2025	Sinéad Ennis MLA (deputy chairperson, Sinn Féin)	South Down	→	Órlaithí Flynn MLA (deputy chairperson, Sinn Féin)	Belfast West
17 February 2025	Sinéad Ennis MLA (Sinn Féin)	South Down	→	Aoife Finnegan MLA (Sinn Féin)	Newry and Armagh
23 September 2025	William Irwin MLA (DUP)	Newry and Armagh	→	Cheryl Brownlee MLA (DUP)	East Antrim

== 2017-2022 Mandate ==
Party	Member	Constituency
Sinn Féin	Carál Ní Chuilín MLA (chairperson)	Belfast North
DUP	Tom Buchanan MLA (deputy chairperson)	West Tyrone
UUP	Rosemary Barton MLA	Fermanagh and South Tyrone
DUP	Maurice Bradley MLA	East Londonderry
SDLP	Sinéad Bradley MLA	South Down
People Before Profit	Gerry Carroll MLA	Belfast West
Sinn Féin	Linda Dillon MLA	Mid Ulster
DUP	Harry Harvey MLA	Strangford
Sinn Féin	Catherine Kelly MLA	West Tyrone

=== Changes 2017–2022 ===
Date	Outgoing member and party	Constituency	→	New member and party	Constituency
17 February 2020	Harry Harvey MLA (DUP)	Strangford	→	Gary Middleton MLA (DUP)	Foyle
18 June 2020	Carál Ní Chuilín MLA (chairperson, Sinn Féin)	Belfast North	→	Linda Dillon MLA (chairperson, Sinn Féin)	Mid Ulster
18 June 2020	Carál Ní Chuilín MLA (Sinn Féin)	Belfast North	→	Vacant	
21 September 2020	Vacant		→	John O'Dowd MLA (Sinn Féin)	Upper Bann
3 November 2020	Catherine Kelly MLA (Sinn Féin)	West Tyrone	→	Vacant	
30 November 2020	Vacant		→	Nicola Brogan MLA (Sinn Féin)	West Tyrone
18 January 2021	John O'Dowd MLA (Sinn Féin)	Upper Bann	→	Carál Ní Chuilín MLA (chairperson, Sinn Féin)	Belfast North
20 January 2021	Linda Dillon MLA (chairperson, Sinn Féin)	Mid Ulster	→	Carál Ní Chuilín MLA (chairperson, Sinn Féin)	Belfast North
22 February 2021	Gary Middleton MLA (DUP)	Foyle	→	Paula Bradley MLA (DUP)	Belfast North
22 March 2021	Paula Bradley MLA (DUP)	Belfast North	→	Gary Middleton MLA (DUP)	Foyle
21 June 2021	Maurice Bradley MLA (DUP)	East Londonderry	→	Joanne Bunting MLA (DUP)	Belfast East
21 June 2021	Gary Middleton MLA (DUP)	Foyle	→	William Humphrey MLA (DUP)	Belfast North
27 September 2021	Linda Dillon MLA (Sinn Féin)	Mid Ulster	→	Ciara Ferguson MLA (Sinn Féin)	Foyle

== 2016-2017 Mandate ==
Party	Member	Constituency
DUP	Gordon Lyons MLA (chairperson)	East Antrim
DUP	Edwin Poots MLA (deputy chairperson)	Lagan Valley
Green (NI)	Steven Agnew MLA	North Down
UUP	Rosemary Barton MLA	Fermanagh and South Tyrone
DUP	Tom Buchanan MLA	West Tyrone
Alliance	Chris Lyttle MLA	Belfast East
Sinn Féin	Fra McCann MLA	Belfast West
SDLP	Colin McGrath MLA	South Down
DUP	Mervyn Storey MLA	North Antrim
Sinn Féin	Conor Murphy MLA	Newry and Armagh
Sinn Féin	Pat Sheehan MLA	Belfast West

=== Changes 2016–2017 ===
Date	Outgoing member and party	Constituency	→	New member and party	Constituency
20 June 2016	Pat Sheehan MLA (Sinn Féin)	Belfast West	→	Barry McElduff MLA (Sinn Féin)	West Tyrone

== 2011-2016 Mandate ==
Party	Member	Constituency
Sinn Féin	Sue Ramsey MLA (chairperson)	Belfast West
DUP	Trevor Clarke MLA (deputy chairperson)	South Antrim
TUV	Jim Allister MLA	North Antrim
UUP	Samuel Gardiner MLA	Upper Bann
Sinn Féin	Gerry Kelly MLA	Belfast North
Alliance	Chris Lyttle MLA	Belfast East
Sinn Féin	Oliver McMullan MLA	East Antrim
DUP	Maurice Morrow MLA	Fermanagh and South Tyrone
SDLP	Alban Maginness MLA	Belfast North
DUP	George Robinson MLA	East Londonderry
DUP	Mervyn Storey MLA	North Antrim

=== Changes 2011–2016 ===
Date	Outgoing member and party	Constituency	→	New member and party	Constituency
6 February 2012	Sue Ramsey MLA (chairperson, Sinn Féin)	Belfast West	→	Gerry Kelly MLA (chairperson, Sinn Féin)	Belfast North
10 September 2012	Sue Ramsey MLA (Sinn Féin)	Belfast West	→	Phil Flanagan MLA (Sinn Féin)	Fermanagh and South Tyrone
21 January 2013	Phil Flanagan MLA (Sinn Féin)	Fermanagh and South Tyrone	→	Barry McElduff MLA (Sinn Féin)	West Tyrone
16 September 2013	Mervyn Storey MLA (DUP)	North Antrim	→	Paula Bradley MLA (DUP)	Belfast North
1 October 2013	Chris Lyttle MLA (Alliance)	Belfast East	→	Kieran McCarthy MLA (Alliance)	Strangford
8 December 2014	Paula Bradley MLA (DUP)	Belfast North	→	Sammy Douglas MLA (DUP)	Belfast East
23 May 2015	Sammy Douglas MLA (DUP)	Belfast East	→	Paul Givan MLA (DUP)	Lagan Valley
18 January 2016	Maurice Morrow MLA (DUP)	Fermanagh and South Tyrone	→	Adrian McQuillan MLA (DUP)	East Londonderry

== 2007-2011 Mandate ==
Party	Member	Constituency
DUP	Maurice Morrow MLA (chairperson)	Fermanagh and South Tyrone
DUP	Mervyn Storey MLA (deputy chairperson)	North Antrim
Sinn Féin	Francis Brolly MLA	East Londonderry
DUP	Wallace Browne MLA	Belfast East
Sinn Féin	Willie Clarke MLA	South Down
Sinn Féin	Raymond McCartney MLA	Foyle
UUP	David McClarty MLA	East Londonderry
DUP	Adrian McQuillan MLA	East Londonderry
Alliance	Seán Neeson MLA	East Antrim
SDLP	Declan O'Loan MLA	North Antrim
UUP	Ken Robinson MLA	East Antrim

=== Changes 2007-2011 ===
Date	Outgoing member and party	Constituency	→	New member and party	Constituency
20 May 2008	Willie Clarke MLA (Sinn Féin)	South Down	→	Mickey Brady MLA (Sinn Féin)	Newry and Armagh
11 December 2009	Francis Brolly MLA (Sinn Féin)	East Londonderry	→	Vacant	
11 January 2010	Vacant		→	Billy Leonard MLA (Sinn Féin)	East Londonderry
13 April 2010	Maurice Morrow MLA (chairperson, DUP)	Fermanagh and South Tyrone	→	Wallace Browne MLA (chairperson, DUP)	Belfast East
20 April 2010	Raymond McCartney MLA (Sinn Féin)	Foyle	→	Paul Butler MLA (Sinn Féin)	Lagan Valley
25 May 2010	Declan O'Loan MLA (SDLP)	North Antrim	→	Thomas Burns MLA (SDLP)	South Antrim

== 1998-2003 Mandate ==
Party	Member	Constituency
Sinn Féin	Conor Murphy MLA (chairperson)	Newry and Armagh
UUP	Duncan Shipley-Dalton MLA (deputy chairperson)	South Antrim
United Unionist Coalition	Fraser Agnew MLA	Belfast North
SDLP	Alex Attwood MLA	Belfast West
UUP	Tom Benson MLA	Strangford
NI Unionist	Roger Hutchinson MLA	East Antrim
SDLP	Alban Maginness MLA	Belfast North
UUP	David McClarty MLA	East Londonderry
DUP	Maurice Morrow MLA	Fermanagh and South Tyrone
DUP	Sammy Wilson MLA	Belfast East

=== Changes 1998-2003 ===
Date	Outgoing member and party	Constituency	→	New member and party	Constituency
27 July 2000	Maurice Morrow MLA (DUP)	Fermanagh and South Tyrone	→	Vacant	
18 October 2000	Sammy Wilson MLA (DUP)	Belfast East	→	Nigel Dodds MLA (DUP)	Belfast North
18 October 2000	Vacant		→	Ian Paisley Jr MLA (DUP)	North Antrim
17 January 2001	Tom Benson MLA (UUP)	Strangford	→	Vacant	
19 February 2001	Vacant		→	Ivan Davis MLA (UUP)	Lagan Valley
12 November 2001	Nigel Dodds MLA (DUP)	Belfast North	→	Maurice Morrow MLA (DUP)	Fermanagh and South Tyrone
5 March 2002	Ian Paisley Jr MLA (DUP)	North Antrim	→	William McCrea MLA (DUP)	Mid Ulster
3 July 2002	Conor Murphy MLA (chairperson, Sinn Féin)	Newry and Armagh	→	Pat McNamee MLA (chairperson, Sinn Féin)	Newry and Armagh
