= List of female members of the Northern Ireland Assembly =

This is a list of women who are or have served as members of the Northern Ireland Assembly.

== List of female members of the Northern Ireland Assembly ==
Party	Name	Constituency	Start	End	Reason
UUP	Jean Coulter (Note: Including term served as a Member of the 1973 Northern Ireland Assembly and as a Member of the Northern Ireland Constitutional Convention.)	Belfast West	1973	1976	Retired
Ind. Unionist	Anne Dickson (Note: Also served as a Member of Parliament (MP) in the House of Commons of Northern Ireland.)	South Antrim	1973	1974	Defected
UPNI	Anne Dickson	South Antrim	1974	1976	Retired
DUP	Eileen Paisley (Note: Also served as a Member of the House of Lords.)	Belfast East	1973	1976	Retired
UUP	Dorothy Dunlop (Note: Including term served as a Member of the 1982 Northern Ireland Assembly.)	Belfast East	1982	1986	Retired
SDLP	Mary McSorley (Note: Did not take seat.)	South Down	1982	1986	Retired
UUP	Mary Simpson	Armagh	1982	1986	Retired
UKUP	Pauline Armitage	East Londonderry	1998	2003	Defeated
APNI	Eileen Bell (Note: Also served as a Member of the Northern Ireland Forum.)	North Down	1998	2007	Retired
UUP	Joan Carson	Fermanagh and South Tyrone	1998	2003	Retired
SF	Bairbre de Brún (Note: Also served as a Member of the European Parliament (MEP).)	Belfast West	1998	2004	Resigned
SF	Michelle Gildernew (Note: Also served as a Member of Parliament (MP).)	Fermanagh and South Tyrone	1998	2012	Resigned
SDLP	Carmel Hanna	Belfast South	1998	2010	Retired
SDLP	Patricia Lewsley	Lagan Valley	1998	2006	Resigned
NIWC	Jane Morrice	North Down	1998	2003	Defeated
NIWC	Monica McWilliams	Belfast South	1998	2003	Defeated
SF	Mary Nelis	Foyle	1998	2004	Resigned
SF	Dara O'Hagan	Upper Bann	1998	2003	Defeated
SDLP	Bríd Rodgers	Upper Bann	1998	2003	Retired
SF	Sue Ramsey	Belfast West	1998	2003	Defeated
SF	Sue Ramsey	Belfast West	2004	2014	Retired
SDLP	Iris Robinson	Strangford	1998	2010	Resigned
SDLP	Annie Courtney	Foyle	2000	2003	Defeated
DUP	Norah Beare	Lagan Valley	2003	2007	Deselected
SDLP	Mary Bradley	Foyle	2003	2011	Retired
DUP	Diane Dodds	Belfast West	2003	2007	Defeated
DUP	Diane Dodds	Upper Bann	2020	present	Serving
Ind. Nationalist	Geraldine Dougan	Mid Ulster	2003	2007	Retired
DUP	Arlene Foster	Fermanagh and South Tyrone	2003	2021	Resigned
SDLP	Dolores Kelly	Upper Bann	2003	2016	Defeated
SDLP	Dolores Kelly	Upper Bann	2017	2022	Defeated
APNI	Naomi Long	Belfast East	2003	2010	Resigned
APNI	Naomi Long	Belfast East	2016	2019	Resigned
APNI	Naomi Long	Belfast East	2020	present	Serving
SF	Patricia O'Rawe	Newry and Armagh	2003	2007	Deselected
SDLP	Margaret Ritchie	South Down	2003	2012	Resigned
SF	Caitríona Ruane	South Down	2003	2017	Retired
SF	Kathy Stanton	Belfast North	2003	2007	Retired
SF	Martina Anderson	Foyle	2007	2012	Resigned
SF	Martina Anderson	Foyle	2020	2021	Resigned
SDLP	Marietta Farrell	Lagan Valley	2007	2007	Defeated
APNI	Anna Lo	Belfast South	2007	2016	Retired
SF	Jennifer McCann	Belfast West	2007	2016	Resigned
SF	Claire McGill	West Tyrone	2007	2011	Retired
DUP	Michelle McIlveen	Strangford	2007	present	Serving
SF	Carál Ní Chuilín	Belfast North	2007	present	Serving
SF	Michelle O'Neill	Mid Ulster	2007	present	Serving
PUP	Dawn Purvis	Belfast East	2007	2011	Defeated
DUP	Michaela Boyle	West Tyrone	2011	2019	Resigned
DUP	Paula Bradley	Belfast North	2011	2022	Retired
DUP	Pam Cameron	South Antrim	2011	present	Serving
APNI	Judith Cochrane	Belfast East	2011	2016	Retired
UUP	Jo-Anne Dobson	Upper Bann	2011	2017	Defeated
SF	Megan Fearon	Newry and Armagh	2011	2020	Resigned
DUP	Brenda Hale	Lagan Valley	2011	2017	Defeated
SDLP	Karen McKevitt	South Down	2011	2016	Defeated
UUP	Sandra Overend	Mid Ulster	2011	2017	Defeated
SF	Rosie McCorley	Belfast West	2012	2016	Defeated
SF	Bronwyn McGahan	Fermanagh and South Tyrone	2012	2016	Retired
SF	Maeve McLaughlin	Foyle	2012	2016	Defeated
Ind. Unionist	Claire Sugden	East Londonderry	2014	present	Serving
SDLP	Claire Hanna	Belfast South	2015	2019	Resigned
DUP	Emma Little-Pengelly	Belfast South	2015	2017	Resigned
DUP	Emma Little-Pengelly	Lagan Valley	2022	present	Serving
SF	Caoimhe Archibald	East Londonderry	2016	present	Serving
APNI	Kellie Armstrong	Strangford	2016	present	Serving
GPNI	Clare Bailey	Belfast South	2016	2022	Defeated
UUP	Rosemary Barton	Fermanagh and South Tyrone	2016	2022	Defeated
SDLP	Sinéad Bradley	South Down	2016	2022	Retired
APNI	Paula Bradshaw	Belfast South	2016	present	Serving
DUP	Joanne Bunting	Belfast East	2016	present	Serving
SF	Linda Dillon	Mid Ulster	2016	present	Serving
SF	Órlaithí Flynn	Belfast West	2016	present	Serving
DUP	Carla Lockhart	Upper Bann	2016	2019	Resigned
SDLP	Nichola Mallon	Belfast North	2016	2022	Defeated
UUP	Jennifer Palmer	Lagan Valley	2016	2017	Defeated
SF	Catherine Seeley	Upper Bann	2016	2017	Retired
SF	Jemma Dolan	Fermanagh and South Tyrone	2017	present	Serving
SF	Sinéad Ennis	South Down	2017	present	Serving
SF	Elisha McCallion	Foyle	2017	2017	Resigned
SF	Karen Mullan	Foyle	2017	2021	Resigned
SF	Emma Rogan	South Down	2017	2022	Resigned
SF	Emma Sheerin	Mid Ulster	2018	present	Serving
GPNI	Rachel Woods	North Down	2019	2022	Defeated
SF	Nicola Brogan	West Tyrone	2020	present	Serving
SF	Deirdre Hargey	Belfast South	2020	present	Serving
SF	Cara Hunter	East Londonderry	2020	present	Serving
SF	Liz Kimmins	Newry and Armagh	2020	present	Serving
SDLP	Sinead McLaughlin	Foyle	2020	present	Serving
DUP	Deborah Erskine	Fermanagh and South Tyrone	2021	present	Serving
SF	Ciara Ferguson	Foyle	2021	present	Serving
SF	Áine Murphy	Fermanagh and South Tyrone	2021	present	Serving
SF	Aisling Reilly	Belfast West	2021	present	Serving
APNI	Connie Egan	North Down	2022	present	Serving
APNI	Sorcha Eastwood	Lagan Valley	2022	2024	Resigned
DUP	Diane Forsythe	South Down	2022	present	Serving
SF	Cathy Mason	South Down	2022	present	Serving
APNI	Nuala McAllister	Belfast North	2022	present	Serving
APNI	Kate Nicholl	Belfast South	2022	present	Serving
APNI	Patricia O'Lynn	North Antrim	2022	2023	Resigned
DUP	Cheryl Brownlee	East Antrim	2023	present	Serving
APNI	Sian Mulholland	North Antrim	2023	present	Serving
APNI	Michelle Guy	Lagan Valley	2024	present	Serving
UUP	Diana Armstrong	Fermanagh and South Tyrone	2024	present	Serving
DUP	Julie Middleton	Foyle	2026	present	Serving
