= Social Democratic and Labour Party election results =

List of results for the UK-based Social Democratic and Labour Party

This article lists the Social Democratic and Labour Party's election results in UK parliamentary elections.

== Summary of general election performance ==
Year	Number of Candidates	Total votes	Average votes per candidate	% UK vote	% NI vote	Change (percentage points)	Saved deposits	Number of MPs (out of NI total)
1974 Feb	12	160,137	13,345	0.5	22.4	N/A	8	1 / 12
1974 Oct	9	154,193	17,133	0.6	22.0	+0.1	8	1 / 12
1979	9	126,325	14,036	0.4	19.7	-0.2	6	1 / 12
1983	17	137,012	8,060	0.4	18.1	0.0	10	1 / 17
1987	13	154,067	11,851	0.5	21.1	+0.1	13	3 / 17
1992	13	184,445	14,118	0.5	23.5	0.0	13	4 / 17
1997	18	190,814	10,601	0.6	24.1	+0.1	15	3 / 18
2001	18	169,865	9,437	0.6	21.0	0.0	16	3 / 18
2005	18	125,626	6,979	0.5	17.5	-0.1	16	3 / 18
2010	18	110,970	6,165	0.4	16.5	-0.1	16	3 / 18
2015	18	99,809	5,545	0.3	13.9	-0.1	15	3 / 18
2017	18	95,419	5,301	0.3	11.7	-0.1	13	0 / 18
2019	15	118,737	7,916	0.3	14.9	0.0	13	2 / 18
2024	18	86,861	4,826	0.3	11.1	0.0	8	2 / 18

== February 1974 general election ==
Constituency	Candidate	Votes	%	Position
Armagh	Paddy O'Hanlon	18,090	29.3	2
Belfast East	Desmond Gillespie	1,502	2.6	4
Belfast North	Thomas Donnelly	12,003	24.4	3
Belfast South	Ben Caraher	4,149	8.0	4
Belfast West	Gerry Fitt	19,554	41.0	1
Fermanagh and South Tyrone	Denis Haughey	15,410	25.0	3
Londonderry	Hugh Logue	23,670	37.7	2
Mid Ulster	Ivan Cooper	19,372	29.1	2
North Antrim	Mary McAlister	10,056	15.5	3
North Down	Dermot Curran	2,376	3.8	3
South Antrim	Patrick Rowan	8,769	12.3	3
South Down	Sean Hollywood	25,486	42.8	2

== October 1974 general election ==
Constituency	Candidate	Votes	%	Position
Armagh	Seamus Mallon	19,855	31.8	2
Belfast North	Thomas Donnelly	11,400	24.1	2
Belfast South	Ben Caraher	2,390	4.7	4
Belfast West	Gerry Fitt	21,821	49.0	1
Londonderry	John Hume	26,118	40.4	2
Mid Ulster	Ivan Cooper	25,885	40.1	2
North Antrim	Mary McAlister	7,616	12.8	3
South Antrim	Patrick Rowan	9,061	13.2	3
South Down	Sean Hollywood	30,047	45.4	2

== 1979 general election ==
Constituency	Candidate	Votes	%	Position
Armagh	Seamus Mallon	23,545	36.1	2
Belfast North	Paschal O'Hare	7,823	18.5	3
Belfast South	Alasdair McDonnell	3,694	7.9	3
Belfast West	Gerry Fitt	16,480	49.5	1
Londonderry	Hugh Logue	19,185	30.2	2
Mid Ulster	Paddy Duffy	19,266	29.4	2
North Antrim	Sean Farren	4,867	7.4	4
South Antrim	Patrick Rowan	7,432	10.1	3
South Down	Eddie McGrady	24,033	37.3	2

== By-elections, 1979–1983 ==
Election	Candidate	Votes	%	Position
1982 Belfast South by-election	Alasdair McDonnell	3,839	8.8	4

== 1983 general election ==
Constituency	Candidate	Votes	%	Position
Belfast East	Peter Prendiville	519	1.3	6
Belfast North	Brian Feeney	5,944	14.0	3
Belfast South	Alasdair McDonnell	3,216	8.6	4
Belfast West	Joe Hendron	10,934	24.6	2
East Antrim	Michael O'Cleary	1,047	2.7	4
East Londonderry	Arthur Doherty	9,397	18.3	3
Fermanagh and South Tyrone	Rosemary Flanagan	9,923	16.5	3
Foyle	John Hume	24,071	46.0	1
Lagan Valley	Cormac Boomer	2,603	6.4	4
Mid Ulster	Denis Haughey	12,044	22.4	3
Newry and Armagh	Seamus Mallon	17,434	36.8	2
North Antrim	Sean Farren	6,193	14.0	3
North Down	Cathal O'Baioll	645	1.6	4
South Antrim	Alban Maginness	3,377	8.7	4
South Down	Eddie McGrady	20,145	39.3	2
Strangford	James Curry	1,713	4.4	4
Upper Bann	James McDonald	7,807	17.9	2

== By-elections, 1983–1987 ==
Election	Candidate	Votes	%	Position
1986 Fermanagh and South Tyrone by-election	Austin Currie	12,081	21.5	3
1986 Mid Ulster by-election	Adrian Colton	13,021	25.3	3
1986 Newry and Armagh by-election	Seamus Mallon	22,694	45.5	1
1986 South Down by-election	Eddie McGrady	23,121	44.8	2

== 1987 general election ==
Constituency	Candidate	Votes	%	Position
Belfast North	Alban Maginness	5,795	15.7	2
Belfast South	Alasdair McDonnell	4,268	13.1	3
Belfast West	Joe Hendron	14,641	35.7	2
East Londonderry	Arthur Doherty	9,375	19.2	2
Fermanagh and South Tyrone	Rosemary Flanagan	10,581	19.1	3
Foyle	John Hume	23,743	48.8	1
Lagan Valley	Billy McDonnell	2,888	6.9	3
Mid Ulster	Denis Haughey	13,644	26.2	2
Newry and Armagh	Seamus Mallon	25,137	48.1	1
North Antrim	Sean Farren	5,149	12.5	2
South Antrim	Donovan McClelland	3,611	9.9	3
South Down	Eddie McGrady	26,579	47.0	1
Upper Bann	Bríd Rodgers	8,676	20.5	2

== By-elections, 1987–1992 ==
Election	Candidate	Votes	%	Position
1990 Upper Bann by-election	Bríd Rodgers	6,698	18.9	2

== 1992 general election ==
Constituency	Candidate	Votes	%	Position
Belfast North	Alban Maginness	7,615	21.2	2
Belfast South	Alasdair McDonnell	6,266	18.7	2
Belfast West	Joe Hendron	17,415	43.6	1
East Londonderry	Arthur Doherty	11,843	22.4	2
Fermanagh and South Tyrone	Tommy Gallagher	12,810	23.2	2
Foyle	John Hume	26,710	51.5	1
Mid Ulster	Denis Haughey	16,994	31.0	2
Newry and Armagh	Seamus Mallon	26,073	49.6	1
North Antrim	Sean Farren	6,512	14.3	3
South Antrim	Donovan McClelland	5,397	12.8	2
South Down	Eddie McGrady	31,523	51.2	1
Upper Bann	Bríd Rodgers	10,661	23.4	2

== 1997 general election ==
Constituency	Candidate	Votes	%	Position
Belfast East	Patricia Lewsley	629	1.6	6
Belfast North	Alban Maginness	8,454	20.4	2
Belfast South	Alasdair McDonnell	9,601	24.3	2
Belfast West	Joe Hendron	17,753	38.7	2
East Antrim	Danny O'Connor	1,576	4.6	6
East Londonderry	Arthur Doherty	8,273	22.0	3
Fermanagh and South Tyrone	Tommy Gallagher	11,060	22.9	3
Foyle	John Hume	25,109	52.5	1
Lagan Valley	Dolores Kelly	3,436	7.8	4
Mid Ulster	Denis Haughey	11,205	22.1	3
Newry and Armagh	Seamus Mallon	22,904	43.0	1
North Antrim	Sean Farren	7,333	15.9	3
North Down	Marietta Farrell	1,602	4.4	5
South Antrim	Donovan McClelland	6,497	16.2	2
South Down	Eddie McGrady	26,181	52.9	1
Strangford	Peter O'Reilly	2,775	6.7	4
Upper Bann	Bríd Rodgers	11,584	24.2	2
West Tyrone	Joe Byrne	14,842	32.1	2

== By-elections, 1997–2001 ==
Election	Candidate	Votes	%	Position
2000 South Antrim by-election	Donovan McClelland	3,496	11.4	3

== 2001 general election ==
Constituency	Candidate	Votes	%	Position
Belfast East	Ciara Farren	880	2.4	6
Belfast North	Alban Maginness	8,592	21.0	3
Belfast South	Alasdair McDonnell	11,609	30.6	2
Belfast West	Alex Attwood	7,754	18.9	2
East Antrim	Danny O'Connor	2,641	7.3	4
East Londonderry	John Dallat	8,298	20.8	3
Fermanagh and South Tyrone	Tommy Gallagher	9,706	18.7	3
Foyle	John Hume	24,538	50.2	1
Lagan Valley	Patricia Lewsley	3,462	7.5	4
Mid Ulster	Eilish Haughey	8,376	16.8	3
Newry and Armagh	Seamus Mallon	20,784	37.4	1
North Antrim	Sean Farren	8,283	16.8	3
North Down	Marietta Farrell	1,275	3.4	3
South Antrim	Sean McKee	5,336	12.1	3
South Down	Eddie McGrady	24,136	46.3	1
Strangford	Danny McCarthy	2,646	6.1	4
Upper Bann	Dolores Kelly	7,607	14.9	4
West Tyrone	Bríd Rodgers	13,942	28.7	3

== 2005 general election ==
Constituency	Candidate	Votes	%	Position
Belfast East	Mary Muldoon	844	2.7	5
Belfast North	Alban Maginness	4,950	16.2	3
Belfast South	Alasdair McDonnell	10,339	32.3	1
Belfast West	Alex Attwood	5,033	14.6	2
East Antrim	Danny O'Connor	1,695	5.3	4
East Londonderry	John Dallat	6,077	17.1	3
Fermanagh and South Tyrone	Tommy Gallagher	7,230	14.8	4
Foyle	Mark Durkan	21,119	46.3	1
Lagan Valley	Patricia Lewsley	2,598	6.1	5
Mid Ulster	Patsy McGlone	7,922	17.4	3
Newry and Armagh	Dominic Bradley	12,770	25.2	2
North Antrim	Sean Farren	5,585	12.2	3
North Down	Liam Logan	1,009	3.1	4
South Antrim	Noreen McClelland	4,706	12.4	3
South Down	Eddie McGrady	21,557	44.7	1
Strangford	Joe Boyle	2,496	6.7	4
Upper Bann	Dolores Kelly	5,747	13.0	4
West Tyrone	Eugene McMenamin	3,949	9.1	4

== 2010 general election ==
Constituency	Candidate	Votes	%	Position
Belfast East	Mary Muldoon	365	1.1	6
Belfast North	Alban Maginness	4,544	12.3	3
Belfast South	Alasdair McDonnell	14,026	41.0	1
Belfast West	Alex Attwood	5,261	16.4	2
East Antrim	Justin McCamphill	2,019	6.6	5
East Londonderry	Thomas Conway	5,399	15.4	4
Fermanagh and South Tyrone	Fearghal McKinney	3,574	7.6	3
Foyle	Mark Durkan	16,922	44.7	1
Lagan Valley	Brian Heading	1,835	5.0	5
Mid Ulster	Tony Quinn	5,826	14.3	3
Newry and Armagh	Dominic Bradley	10,526	23.4	2
North Antrim	Declan O'Loan	3,738	8.8	5
North Down	Liam Logan	680	2.0	6
South Antrim	Michelle Byrne	2,955	8.7	4
South Down	Margaret Ritchie	20,648	48.5	1
Strangford	Claire Hanna	2,164	6.7	4
Upper Bann	Dolores Kelly	5,276	12.8	4
West Tyrone	Joe Byrne	5,212	14.0	4

== By-elections, 2010–2015 ==
Election	Candidate	Votes	%	Position
2011 Belfast West by-election	Alex Attwood	3,088	13.5	2
2013 Mid Ulster by-election	Patsy McGlone	6,478	17.4	3

== 2015 general election ==
Constituency	Candidate	Votes	%	Position
Belfast East	Mary Muldoon	127	0.3	6
Belfast North	Alban Maginness	3,338	8.2	3
Belfast South	Alasdair McDonnell	9,560	24.5	1
Belfast West	Alex Attwood	3,475	9.8	3
East Antrim	Margaret McKillop	1,639	4.9	7
East Londonderry	Gerry Mullan	4,268	12.3	4
Fermanagh and South Tyrone	John Coyle	2,732	5.4	3
Foyle	Mark Durkan	17,725	47.9	1
Lagan Valley	Pat Catney	2,500	6.3	4
Mid Ulster	Malachy Quinn	5,055	12.4	4
Newry and Armagh	Justin McNulty	12,026	24.1	3
North Antrim	Declan O'Loan	2,920	7.0	5
North Down	Tom Woolley	355	1.0	8
South Antrim	Roisin Lynch	2,990	8.2	5
South Down	Margaret Ritchie	18,077	42.3	1
Strangford	Joe Boyle	2,335	6.9	4
Upper Bann	Dolores Kelly	4,238	9.0	4
West Tyrone	Daniel McCrossan	6,444	16.7	3

== 2017 general election ==
Constituency	Candidate	Votes	%	Position
Belfast East	Séamas de Faoite	167	0.4	7
Belfast North	Martin McAuley	2,058	4.5	4
Belfast South	Alasdair McDonnell	11,303	25.9	2
Belfast West	Tim Attwood	2,860	7.0	4
East Antrim	Margaret McKillop	1,278	3.4	5
East Londonderry	Stephanie Quigley	4,423	10.8	3
Fermanagh and South Tyrone	Mary Garrity	2,587	4.8	3
Foyle	Mark Durkan	18,087	39.3	2
Lagan Valley	Pat Catney	3,384	7.5	4
Mid Ulster	Malachy Quinn	4,563	9.8	3
Newry and Armagh	Justin McNulty	9,055	16.9	3
North Antrim	Declan O'Loan	2,574	5.3	6
North Down	Caoimhe McNeill	400	1.0	7
South Antrim	Roisin Lynch	2,362	5.5	5
South Down	Margaret Ritchie	17,882	35.1	2
Strangford	Joe Boyle	2,404	6.2	4
Upper Bann	Declan McAlinden	4,397	8.6	4
West Tyrone	Daniel McCrossan	5,635	13.0	3

== 2019 general election ==
The SDLP did not stand candidates in Belfast East, Belfast North or North Down in order to aid anti-Brexit and anti-Democratic Unionist Party candidates in those constituencies.

Constituency	Candidate	Votes	%	Position
Belfast South	Claire Hanna	27,079	57.2	1
Belfast West	Paul Doherty	2,985	7.7	4
East Antrim	Angela Mulholland	902	2.4	6
East Londonderry	Cara Hunter	6,158	15.7	2
Fermanagh and South Tyrone	Adam Gannon	3,446	6.8	3
Foyle	Colum Eastwood	26,881	57.0	1
Lagan Valley	Ally Haydock	1,758	3.9	4
Mid Ulster	Denise Johnston	6,384	14.3	3
Newry and Armagh	Pete Byrne	9,449	18.6	3
North Antrim	Margaret McKillop	2,943	6.7	5
South Antrim	Roisin Lynch	2,288	5.3	5
South Down	Michael Savage	14,517	29.2	2
Strangford	Joe Boyle	1,994	5.3	4
Upper Bann	Dolores Kelly	4,623	9.2	5
West Tyrone	Daniel McCrossan	7,330	17.8	3

== 2024 general election ==
Constituency	Candidate	Votes	%	Position
Belfast East	Séamas de Faoite	619	1.4	6
Belfast North	Carl Whyte	1,413	3.5	5
Belfast South and Mid Down	Claire Hanna	21,345	49.1	1
Belfast West	Paul Doherty	4,318	10.9	3
East Antrim	Margaret McKillop	892	2.2	6
East Londonderry	Cara Hunter	5,260	12.7	3
Fermanagh and South Tyrone	Paul Blake	2,386	4.7	4
Foyle	Colum Eastwood	15,647	40.8	1
Lagan Valley	Simon Lee	1,028	2.1	5
Mid Ulster	Denise Johnston	3,722	8.2	3
Newry and Armagh	Pete Byrne	6,806	14.8	2
North Antrim	Helen Maher	1,661	4.0	6
North Down	Déirdre Vaughan	657	1.5	5
South Antrim	Roisin Lynch	1,589	3.7	6
South Down	Colin McGrath	10,418	23.0	2
Strangford	Will Polland	1,783	4.6	6
Upper Bann	Malachy Quinn	1,496	3.2	5
West Tyrone	Daniel McCrossan	5,821	13.3	3
