= Northern Ireland Assembly and Executive Review Committee =

The Northern Ireland Assembly and Executive Review Committee is appointed by the Northern Ireland Assembly to review the functioning of the Assembly and Executive.

== History ==
The committee was created in 2007 following the St Andrew's Agreement and amendment of the Northern Ireland Act 1998. It has considered issues such as the official opposition in the Assembly, cross-cutting Executive strategies, handling Westminster Statutory Instruments, and proposals for institutional reform.

== Membership ==
Membership of the committee is as follows:

Party	Member	Constituency
DUP	Jonathan Buckley MLA (Chairperson)	Upper Bann
Sinn Féin	Pat Sheehan MLA (Deputy Chairperson)	Belfast West
Sinn Féin	Sinéad Ennis MLA	South Down
Alliance	Michelle Guy MLA	Lagan Valley
DUP	Michelle McIlveen MLA	Strangford
DUP	Gary Middleton MLA	Foyle
Sinn Féin	Carál Ní Chuilín MLA	Belfast North
SDLP	Matthew O'Toole MLA	Belfast South
UUP	John Stewart MLA	East Antrim

== 2022-2027 Mandate ==
Party	Member	Constituency
DUP	Jonathan Buckley MLA (Chairperson)	Upper Bann
Sinn Féin	Declan McAleer MLA (Deputy Chairperson)	West Tyrone
UUP	Tom Elliott MLA	Fermanagh and South Tyrone
SDLP	Cara Hunter MLA	East Londonderry
DUP	Michelle McIlveen MLA	Strangford
DUP	Gary Middleton MLA	Foyle
Alliance	Sian Mulholland MLA	North Antrim
Sinn Féin	Áine Murphy MLA	Fermanagh and South Tyrone
Sinn Féin	Pat Sheehan MLA	Belfast West

=== Changes 2022–2027 ===
Date	Outgoing member and party	Constituency	→	New member and party	Constituency
11 March 2024	Sian Mulholland MLA (Alliance)	North Antrim	→	Kate Nicholl MLA (Alliance)	Belfast South
28 May 2024	Cara Hunter MLA (SDLP)	East Londonderry	→	Matthew O'Toole MLA (SDLP)	Belfast South
9 September 2024	Kate Nicholl MLA (Alliance)	Belfast South	→	Michelle Guy MLA (Alliance)	Lagan Valley
27 September 2024	Tom Elliott MLA (UUP)	Fermanagh and South Tyrone	→	John Stewart MLA (UUP)	East Antrim
3 February 2025	Declan McAleer MLA (Deputy Chairperson, Sinn Féin)	West Tyrone	→	Pat Sheehan MLA (Deputy Chairperson, Sinn Féin)	Belfast West
10 February 2025	Áine Murphy MLA (Sinn Féin)	Fermanagh and South Tyrone	→	Sinéad Ennis MLA (Sinn Féin)	South Down
10 February 2025	Declan McAleer MLA (Sinn Féin)	West Tyrone	→	Carál Ní Chuilín MLA (Sinn Féin)	Belfast North

== 2017-2022 Mandate ==
Party	Member	Constituency
DUP	Mervyn Storey MLA (Chairperson)	North Antrim
Sinn Féin	Maolíosa McHugh MLA (Deputy Chairperson)	West Tyrone
TUV	Jim Allister MLA	North Antrim
Alliance	Kellie Armstrong MLA	Strangford
DUP	Jonathan Buckley MLA	Upper Bann
UUP	Robbie Butler MLA	Lagan Valley
DUP	Alex Easton MLA	North Down
Sinn Féin	Gerry Kelly MLA	Belfast North
SDLP	Colin McGrath MLA	South Down

=== Changes 2017–2022 ===
Date	Outgoing member and party	Constituency	→	New member and party	Constituency
14 June 2021	Mervyn Storey MLA (Chairperson, DUP)	North Antrim	→	Pam Cameron MLA (Chairperson, DUP)	South Antrim
5 July 2021	Jonathan Buckley MLA (DUP)	Upper Bann	→	Gordon Lyons MLA (DUP)	East Antrim
6 July 2021	Pam Cameron MLA (Chairperson, DUP)	South Antrim	→	Peter Weir MLA (Chairperson, DUP)	Strangford
20 September 2021	Gordon Lyons MLA (DUP)	East Antrim	→	Paul Frew MLA (DUP)	North Antrim
27 September 2021	Alex Easton MLA (DUP)	North Down	→	George Robinson MLA (DUP)	East Londonderry

== 2016-2017 Mandate ==
Party	Member	Constituency
DUP	Christopher Stalford MLA (Chairperson)	Belfast South
Sinn Féin	Michaela Boyle MLA (Deputy Chairperson)	West Tyrone
TUV	Jim Allister MLA	North Antrim
SDLP	Alex Attwood MLA	Belfast West
DUP	Brenda Hale MLA	Lagan Valley
UUP	Danny Kennedy MLA	Newry and Armagh
DUP	Nelson McCausland MLA	Belfast North
Sinn Féin	Daithí McKay MLA	North Antrim
Sinn Féin	Ian Milne MLA	Mid Ulster
UUP	Philip Smith MLA	Strangford
DUP	Jim Wells MLA	South Down

=== Changes 2016–2017 ===
Date	Outgoing member and party	Constituency	→	New member and party	Constituency
18 August 2016	Daithí McKay MLA (Sinn Féin)	North Antrim	→	Vacant	
12 September 2016	Vacant		→	Philip McGuigan MLA (Sinn Féin)	North Antrim

== 2011-2016 Mandate ==
Party	Member	Constituency
DUP	Stephen Moutray MLA (Chairperson)	Upper Bann
Sinn Féin	Pat Sheehan MLA (Deputy Chairperson)	Belfast West
UUP	Roy Beggs Jr MLA	East Antrim
DUP	Gregory Campbell MLA	East Londonderry
Alliance	Stewart Dickson MLA	East Antrim
DUP	Paul Givan MLA	Lagan Valley
DUP	Simon Hamilton MLA	Strangford
Sinn Féin	Paul Maskey MLA	Belfast West
Sinn Féin	Raymond McCartney MLA	Foyle
SDLP	Conall McDevitt MLA	Belfast South
UUP	Mike Nesbitt MLA	Strangford

=== Changes 2011–2016 ===
Date	Outgoing member and party	Constituency	→	New member and party	Constituency
26 September 2011	Mike Nesbitt MLA (UUP)	Strangford	→	Sandra Overend MLA (UUP)	Mid Ulster
26 September 2011	Paul Maskey MLA (Sinn Féin)	Belfast West	→	Pat Doherty MLA (Sinn Féin)	West Tyrone
23 April 2012	Sandra Overend MLA (UUP)	Mid Ulster	→	John McCallister MLA (UUP)	South Down
1 July 2012	Pat Doherty MLA (Sinn Féin)	West Tyrone	→	Vacant	
10 September 2012	Vacant		→	Caitríona Ruane MLA (Sinn Féin)	South Down
4 March 2013	John McCallister MLA (UUP)	South Down	→	Seán Rogers MLA (SDLP)	South Down
4 September 2013	Conall McDevitt MLA (SDLP)	Belfast South	→	Vacant	
1 October 2013	Stewart Dickson MLA (Alliance)	East Antrim	→	Trevor Lunn MLA (Alliance)	Lagan Valley
7 October 2013	Vacant		→	Alex Attwood MLA (SDLP)	Belfast West
3 March 2014	Simon Hamilton MLA (DUP)	Strangford	→	Paula Bradley MLA (DUP)	Belfast North
1 December 2014	Paul Givan MLA (DUP)	Lagan Valley	→	Sammy Douglas MLA (DUP)	Belfast East
8 December 2014	Sammy Douglas MLA (DUP)	Belfast East	→	Alastair Ross MLA (DUP)	East Antrim
9 February 2015	Roy Beggs Jr MLA (UUP)	East Antrim	→	Robin Swann MLA (UUP)	North Antrim
14 September 2015	Robin Swann MLA (UUP)	North Antrim	→	Danny Kennedy MLA (UUP)	Newry and Armagh

== 2007-2011 Mandate ==
Party	Member	Constituency
DUP	Jeffrey Donaldson MLA (Chairperson)	Lagan Valley
Sinn Féin	Raymond McCartney MLA (Deputy Chairperson)	Foyle
SDLP	Alex Attwood MLA	Belfast West
SDLP	Carmel Hanna MLA	Belfast South
UUP	Danny Kennedy MLA	Newry and Armagh
DUP	Nelson McCausland MLA	Belfast North
DUP	Ian McCrea MLA	Mid Ulster
UUP	Alan McFarland MLA	North Down
Sinn Féin	Carál Ní Chuilín MLA	Belfast North
Sinn Féin	John O'Dowd MLA	Upper Bann
DUP	George Robinson MLA	East Londonderry

=== Changes 2007-2011 ===
Date	Outgoing member and party	Constituency	→	New member and party	Constituency
4 March 2008	Jeffrey Donaldson MLA (Chairperson, DUP)	Lagan Valley	→	Jimmy Spratt MLA (Chairperson, DUP)	Belfast South
20 May 2008	Carál Ní Chuilín MLA (Sinn Féin)	Belfast North	→	Alex Maskey MLA (Sinn Féin)	Belfast South
15 September 2008	Ian McCrea MLA (DUP)	Mid Ulster	→	Simon Hamilton MLA (DUP)	Strangford
15 September 2008	George Robinson MLA (DUP)	East Londonderry	→	Ian Paisley Jr MLA (DUP)	North Antrim
15 September 2009	Nelson McCausland MLA (DUP)	Belfast North	→	Nigel Dodds MLA (DUP)	Belfast North
25 January 2010	Carmel Hanna MLA (SDLP)	Belfast South	→	Declan O'Loan MLA (SDLP)	North Antrim
19 April 2010	Alan McFarland MLA (UUP)	North Down	→	Fred Cobain MLA (UUP)	Belfast North
13 April 2010	Raymond McCartney MLA (Deputy Chairperson, Sinn Féin)	Foyle	→	Alex Maskey MLA (Deputy Chairperson, Sinn Féin)	Belfast South
25 May 2010	Alex Attwood MLA (SDLP)	Belfast West	→	Conall McDevitt MLA (SDLP)	Belfast South
7 June 2010	Declan O'Loan MLA (SDLP)	North Antrim	→	Margaret Ritchie MLA (SDLP)	South Down
18 June 2010	Ian Paisley Jr MLA (DUP)	North Antrim	→	Vacant	
14 September 2010	Vacant		→	Jonathan Bell MLA (DUP)	Strangford
27 September 2010	Nigel Dodds MLA (DUP)	Belfast North	→	Paul Givan MLA (DUP)	Lagan Valley
9 November 2010	Danny Kennedy MLA (UUP)	Newry and Armagh	→	Tom Elliott MLA (UUP)	Fermanagh and South Tyrone
14 December 2010	John O'Dowd MLA (Sinn Féin)	Upper Bann	→	Pat Sheehan MLA (Sinn Féin)	Belfast West
