= Passmore =

Passmore may refer to:

- Passmore (surname)
- Passmore Williamson (1822–1895), American abolitionist and businessman
- Passmore, Milton Keynes, England, a housing development

== See also ==
- Passmores Academy, a school in Harlow, Essex, England
- Pasmore (disambiguation)
