= Gerry Carroll =

Northern Irish politician (born 1987)

Gerry Carroll MLA
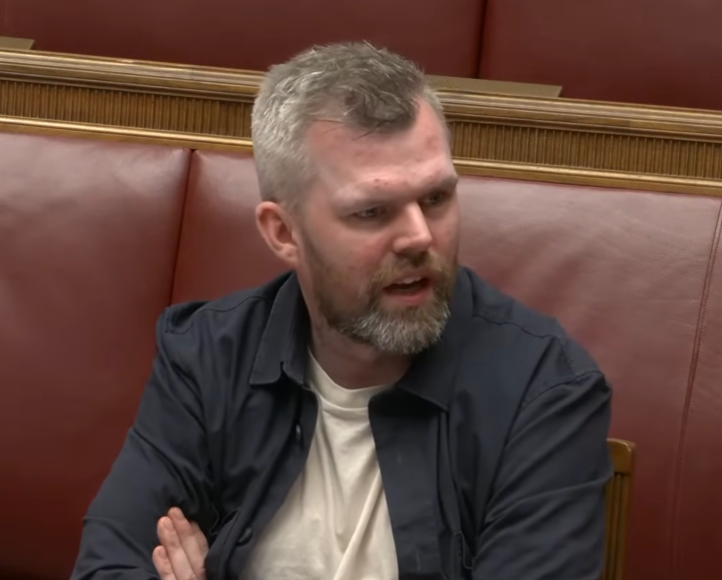
- Carroll in June 2026

Member of the Northern Ireland Assembly for Belfast West
- Incumbent
- Assumed office 7 May 2016
- Preceded by: Rosie McCorley

Member of Belfast City Council
- In office 22 May 2014 – 7 May 2016 Serving with six others
- Preceded by: Office created
- Succeeded by: Matthew Collins
- Constituency: Black Mountain

Personal details
- Born: 27 April 1987 (age 39) Belfast, Northern Ireland
- Party: People Before Profit
- Education: University of Ulster
- Occupation: Politician

Gerry Carroll (born 27 April 1987) is a People Before Profit politician and socialist activist from Belfast, Northern Ireland, who has been a Member of the Legislative Assembly (MLA) for Belfast West since 2016. Carroll also served as a Belfast City Councillor for the Black Mountain DEA from 2014 until 2016.

== Career ==
When aged 16, Carroll fund-raised with fellow activists to travel to Edinburgh, Scotland for the Make Poverty History protest. He contested the 2011 Belfast West by-election—triggered by the resignation of Gerry Adams—for the People Before Profit, and won 7.6% of the vote. At the 2014 Belfast City Council election he gained one of the seven seats in the Black Mountain electoral area from Sinn Féin, coming third. Following his election, he said that he did not describe himself as a nationalist or a unionist, instead choosing to identify as a socialist. He said: "There is a lot of anger in West Belfast at the minute over the situation at Royal Victoria Hospital's A&E, the privatisation of leisure centres and the Casement Park issues...residents have been trampled on". He contested Belfast West again at the 2015 general election, this time coming second, gaining 19.2% of the vote and reducing the Sinn Féin majority from 57.1% to 35.0%.

After being elected a councillor, Carroll criticised the large pay rises that were given to councillors whilst other council staff suffered effective pay cuts, and campaigned against privatisation and cuts.

He criticised Sinn Féin's "support for capitalism", and spoke against the "sectarian nature" of politics in Northern Ireland. In August 2014 he said: "In Northern Ireland sectarianism is at the heart of the state. I don't accept that, but then again I don't accept the conservative right-wing state in the south". At the 2016 Assembly election he was elected an MLA for Belfast West, topping the poll on the first count and gaining a seat from Rosie McCorley of Sinn Féin. He was re-elected at the 2017 election; however, his vote fell from 22.9% to 12.2% in the face of a 4% overall Sinn Féin vote increase that cost fellow People Before Profit MLA Eamonn McCann and the SDLP's Alex Attwood their re-election bids.

Carroll's support for Brexit, in an area in which three-quarters of voters voted Remain, attracted criticism from Sinn Féin and pro-EU activists.

Carroll stood in the 2019 general election and came in second place behind incumbent Sinn Féin MP Paul Maskey.

Carroll defended the seat in the 2022 Northern Ireland Assembly election but with a reduced majority of 7.51% of first preference votes, down from 12.15% in 2017.

== Electoral history ==
=== 2024 UK general election ===
General election 2024: Belfast West
| Party | Candidate | Votes | % | ±% |
|---|---|---|---|---|
| Sinn Féin | Paul Maskey | 21,009 | 52.9 | +4.4 |
| People Before Profit | Gerry Carroll | 5,048 | 12.7 | −1.4 |
| SDLP | Paul Doherty | 4,318 | 10.9 | +3.5 |
| DUP | Frank McCoubrey | 4,304 | 10.8 | −7.4 |
| TUV | Ann McClure | 2,010 | 5.1 | New |
| Alliance | Eóin Millar | 1,077 | 2.7 | −4.4 |
| Aontú | Gerard Herdman | 904 | 2.3 | −1.4 |
| UUP | Ben Sharkey | 461 | 1.2 | +0.3 |
| Green (NI) | Ash Jones | 451 | 1.1 | New |
| Independent | Tony Mallon | 161 | 0.4 | New |
| Majority | | 15,961 | 40.2 | |
| Turnout | | | 53.0 | −6.9 |
| Registered electors | | 75,346 | | |
| Sinn Féin hold | | Swing | ▲2.9 | |

=== 2019 UK general election ===
General election 2019: Belfast West
| Party | Candidate | Votes | % | ±% |
|---|---|---|---|---|
| Sinn Féin | Paul Maskey | 20,866 | 53.8 | −12.9 |
| People Before Profit | Gerry Carroll | 6,194 | 16.0 | +5.8 |
| DUP | Frank McCoubrey | 5,220 | 13.5 | +0.1 |
| SDLP | Paul Doherty | 2,985 | 7.7 | +0.7 |
| Alliance | Donnamarie Higgins | 1,882 | 4.9 | +3.0 |
| Aontú | Monica Digney | 1,635 | 4.2 | New |
| Majority | | 14,672 | 37.8 | −15.6 |
| Turnout | | 38,782 | 59.1 | −6.3 |
| Registered electors | | 65,621 | | |
| Sinn Féin hold | | Swing | | |

=== 2017 UK general election ===
General election 2017: Belfast West
| Party | Candidate | Votes | % | ±% |
|---|---|---|---|---|
| Sinn Féin | Paul Maskey | 27,107 | 66.7 | +12.5 |
| DUP | Frank McCoubrey | 5,455 | 13.4 | +5.6 |
| People Before Profit | Gerry Carroll | 4,132 | 10.2 | −9.0 |
| SDLP | Tim Attwood | 2,860 | 7.0 | −2.8 |
| Alliance | Sorcha Eastwood | 731 | 1.9 | +0.1 |
| Workers' Party | Conor Campbell | 348 | 0.9 | −0.8 |
| Majority | | 21,652 | 53.4 | +18.4 |
| Turnout | | 40,830 | 65.4 | +9.1 |
| Registered electors | | 62,423 | | |
| Sinn Féin hold | | Swing | +12.5 | |

=== 2017 Northern Ireland Assembly election ===
2017 Assembly election: Belfast West - 5 seats
| Party | Candidate | FPv% | Count | | | |
| Party | Candidate | FPv% | 1 | 2 | 3 | 4 |
|---|---|---|---|---|---|---|
| Sinn Féin | Órlaithí Flynn | 17.1 | 6,918 | | | |
| People Before Profit | Gerry Carroll | 12.2 | 4,903 | 6,514 | 8,252 | |
| Sinn Féin | Alex Maskey | 15.7 | 6,346 | 6,451 | 7,036 | |
| Sinn Féin | Fra McCann | 15.4 | 6,201 | 6,314 | 6,636 | 7,067 |
| Sinn Féin | Pat Sheehan | 13.5 | 5,466 | 5,515 | 5,739 | 5,903 |
| DUP | Frank McCoubrey | 10.1 | 4,063 | 4,372 | 4,490 | 4,521 |
| SDLP | Alex Attwood | 8.6 | 3,452 | 4,019 | | |
| People Before Profit | Michael Collins | 2.7 | 1,096 | | | |
| Alliance | Sorcha Eastwood | 1.9 | 747 | | | |
| UUP | Fred Rogers | 1.2 | 486 | | | |
| Workers' Party | Conor Campbell | 1.0 | 415 | | | |
| Green (NI) | Ellen Murray | 0.6 | 251 | | | |
Electorate: 61,309 Valid: 40,344 Spoilt: 586 (1.43%) Quota: 6,725 Turnout: 40,930 (66.76%)

=== 2016 Northern Ireland Assembly election ===
2016 Assembly election: Belfast West - 6 seats
| Party | Candidate | FPv% | Count | | | | | | | |
| Party | Candidate | FPv% | 1 | 2 | 3 | 4 | 5 | 6 | 7 | 8 |
|---|---|---|---|---|---|---|---|---|---|---|
| People Before Profit | Gerry Carroll | 22.9 | 8,299 | | | | | | | |
| Sinn Féin | Alex Maskey | 13.1 | 4,769 | 5,360.80 | | | | | | |
| Sinn Féin | Pat Sheehan | 9.7 | 3,516 | 3,761.08 | 3,829.20 | 6,393.20 | | | | |
| Sinn Féin | Fra McCann | 11.1 | 4,028 | 4,283.20 | 4,479.48 | 4,756.68 | 5,891.73 | | | |
| Sinn Féin | Jennifer McCann | 12.1 | 4,386 | 4,648.68 | 4,755.04 | 4,988.88 | 5,044.81 | 5,750.11 | | |
| SDLP | Alex Attwood | 7.3 | 2,647 | 3,407.76 | 4,161.36 | 4,234.52 | 4,242.98 | 4,245.38 | 4,299.08 | 4,430.20 |
| DUP | Frank McCoubrey | 10.4 | 3,766 | 3,780.52 | 4,332.28 | 4,336.28 | 4,337.69 | 4,337.69 | 4,337.69 | 4,341.21 |
| Sinn Féin | Rosie McCorley | 8.4 | 3,053 | 3,244.40 | 3,303.24 | | | | | |
| Workers' Party | Conor Campbell | 1.5 | 532 | 766.54 | | | | | | |
| Green (NI) | Ellen Murray | 0.9 | 327 | 705.84 | | | | | | |
| UUP | Gareth Martin | 1.8 | 654 | 668.96 | | | | | | |
| Alliance | Jemima Higgins | 0.8 | 291 | 427.40 | | | | | | |
Electorate: 63,993 Valid: 36,268 Spoilt: 722 (1.95%) Quota: 5,182 Turnout: 56.70

=== 2015 UK general election ===
General election 2015: Belfast West
| Party | Candidate | Votes | % | ±% |
|---|---|---|---|---|
| Sinn Féin | Paul Maskey | 19,163 | 54.2 | −16.9 |
| People Before Profit | Gerry Carroll | 6,798 | 19.2 | N/A |
| SDLP | Alex Attwood | 3,475 | 9.8 | −6.6 |
| DUP | Frank McCoubrey | 2,773 | 7.8 | +0.2 |
| UUP | Bill Manwaring | 1,088 | 3.1 | 0.0 |
| UKIP | Brian Higginson | 765 | 2.2 | New |
| Alliance | Gerard Catney | 636 | 1.8 | −0.1 |
| Workers' Party | John Lowry | 597 | 1.7 | New |
| NI Conservatives | Paul Shea | 34 | 0.1 | New |
| Majority | | 12,365 | 35.0 | −19.7 |
| Turnout | | 35,329 | 56.3 | +2.3 |
| Registered electors | | 62,697 | | |
| Sinn Féin hold | | Swing | −14.0 | |

=== 2014 Belfast City Council election ===
2014 Belfast City Council election - Black Mountain - 7 seats
| Party | Candidate | FPv% | Count | | | | | | |
| Party | Candidate | FPv% | 1 | 2 | 3 | 4 | 5 | 6 | 7 |
|---|---|---|---|---|---|---|---|---|---|
| Sinn Féin | Steven Corr* | 12.86% | 1,793 | | | | | | |
| Sinn Féin | Janice Austin*† | 12.80% | 1,784 | | | | | | |
| People Before Profit | Gerry Carroll † | 12.13% | 1,691 | 1,789 | | | | | |
| Sinn Féin | Emma Groves* | 11.68% | 1,628 | 1,637 | 1,757 | | | | |
| Sinn Féin | Arder Carson* | 10.82% | 1,509 | 1,527 | 1,628 | 1,629.68 | 1,634.18 | 1,636.12 | 1,641.44 |
| SDLP | Tim Attwood* | 9.02% | 1,258 | 1,452 | 1,596 | 1,597.18 | 1,631.68 | 1,632.72 | 1,634.26 |
| Sinn Féin | Ciarán Beattie* | 9.61% | 1,340 | 1,369 | 1,472 | 1,501.46 | 1,504.46 | 1,534.22 | 1,538.14 |
| Sinn Féin | Caoimhín Mhic Giolla Mhin* | 10.24% | 1,428 | 1,450 | 1,521 | 1,522.30 | 1,526.05 | 1,527.19 | 1,529.71 |
| éirígí | Pádraic MacCoitir | 7.36% | 1,026 | 1,040 | | | | | |
| Workers' Party | Joanne Lowry | 1.14% | 159 | | | | | | |
| SDLP | Gerard McDonald | 0.95% | 133 | | | | | | |
| Alliance | Lauren Gray | 0.79% | 110 | | | | | | |
| NI21 | Chris Valente | 0.60% | 83 | | | | | | |
Electorate: 25,146 Valid: 13,942 (55.44%) Spoilt: 369 Quota: 1,743 Turnout: 14,311 (56.91%)

=== 2011 UK by-election ===
2011 Belfast West by-election
| Party | Candidate | Votes | % | ±% |
|---|---|---|---|---|
| Sinn Féin | Paul Maskey | 16,211 | 70.6 | −0.5 |
| SDLP | Alex Attwood | 3,088 | 13.5 | −2.9 |
| People Before Profit | Gerry Carroll | 1,751 | 7.6 | New |
| DUP | Brian Kingston | 1,393 | 6.1 | −1.5 |
| UUP | Bill Manwaring | 386 | 1.7 | −1.4 |
| Alliance | Aaron McIntyre | 122 | 0.5 | −1.4 |
| Majority | | 13,123 | 57.1 | +2.4 |
| Turnout | | 22,951 | 37.5 | −16.5 |
| Registered electors | | 61,441 | | |
| Sinn Féin hold | | Swing | +1.2 | |

=== 2011 Northern Ireland Assembly election ===
2011 Assembly election: Belfast West - 6 seats
| Party | Candidate | FPv% | Count | | | | | | | | | | |
| Party | Candidate | FPv% | 1 | 2 | 3 | 4 | 5 | 6 | 7 | 8 | 9 | 10 | 11 |
|---|---|---|---|---|---|---|---|---|---|---|---|---|---|
| Sinn Féin | Paul Maskey | 15.4 | 5,343 | | | | | | | | | | |
| Sinn Féin | Jennifer McCann | 15.1 | 5,239 | | | | | | | | | | |
| Sinn Féin | Fra McCann | 12.9 | 4,481 | 4,587.96 | 4,604.96 | 4,613.08 | 4,645.50 | 4,682.60 | 4,735.84 | 4,837.22 | 4,838.34 | 5,167.34 | |
| SDLP | Alex Attwood | 10.9 | 3,765 | 3,776.69 | 3,780.09 | 3,787.09 | 3,890.45 | 3,939.62 | 4,083.74 | 4,719.58 | 4,780.65 | 5,151.65 | |
| Sinn Féin | Sue Ramsey | 11.9 | 4,116 | 4,340.28 | 4,350.88 | 4,358.19 | 4,377.40 | 4,394.47 | 4,407.47 | 4,423.94 | 4,433.99 | 4,683.90 | 4,823.06 |
| Sinn Féin | Pat Sheehan | 10.8 | 3,723 | 3,737.35 | 3,960.50 | 3,971.78 | 3,996.39 | 4,016.61 | 4,029.73 | 4,051.85 | 4,054.90 | 4,249.77 | 4,327.19 |
| DUP | Brian Kingston | 7.5 | 2,587 | 2,587.28 | 2,587.33 | 2,587.33 | 2,600.45 | 2,604.45 | 2,607.45 | 2,617.57 | 3,834.57 | 3,866.57 | 3,866.57 |
| People Before Profit | Gerry Carroll | 4.8 | 1,661 | 1,664.85 | 1,665.85 | 1,701.85 | 1,732.85 | 1,853.97 | 1,939.09 | 1,977.31 | 1,999.31 | | |
| UUP | Bill Manwaring | 4.2 | 1,471 | 1,471.21 | 1,471.36 | 1,473.36 | 1,503.41 | 1,512.41 | 1,517.41 | 1,526.41 | | | |
| SDLP | Colin Keenan | 2.3 | 802 | 803.26 | 804.41 | 807.41 | 853.58 | 878.63 | 981.82 | | | | |
| Workers' Party | John Lowry | 1.7 | 586 | 586.63 | 587.03 | 590.10 | 607.24 | 644.38 | | | | | |
| Socialist Party | Pat Lawlor | 1.1 | 384 | 384.42 | 384.92 | 399.92 | 408.92 | | | | | | |
| Alliance | Dan McGuinness | 1.1 | 365 | 367.66 | 368.76 | 370.76 | | | | | | | |
| Independent | Brian Pelan | 0.4 | 122 | 122.77 | 122.92 | | | | | | | | |
Electorate: 61,520 Valid: 34,645 Spoilt: 973 Quota: 4,950 Turnout: 35,618 (57.9%)

Northern Ireland Assembly
| Preceded by Rosie McCorley | MLA for Belfast West; 2016–present | Incumbent |
