= Passmore (surname) =

Passmore is a surname. Notable people with the surname include:

- Deborah Griscom Passmore (1840–1911), botanical illustrator for the U.S. Department of Agriculture
- George Passmore (born 1942), of the artists Gilbert and George
- George Passmore (lacrosse) (1889–1952), American lacrosse player
- George Passmore (cricketer) (1852-1935) English Cricketer
- Jake Passmore (born 2005), Irish diver
- John Passmore (1914–2004), Australian philosopher
- John Passmore (artist) (1904–1984), Australian painter
- Lori Passmore, Canadian/British biologist
- Matt Passmore (born 1973), Australian actor
- Michael Passmore (born 1964), former Australian rules footballer
- Norman Passmore (1915–2003), American football coach
- Rhianon Passmore (born 1972), British politician
- Steve Passmore (born 1973), Canadian former professional ice hockey goaltender
- Thomas Passmore (1931–1989), Northern Irish unionist politician
- Tim Passmore (born 1959), British police and crime commissioner
- Todd Passmore (born 1970), better known as Barry Houston, American semi-retired professional wrestler
- Walter Passmore (1867–1946), English singer and actor
- William J. Passmore (1933–2009), American jockey and racing steward, son of William L. Passmore
- William L. Passmore (1910–2002), American jockey and horse trainer
- William T. Passmore (1882–1955), American lacrosse player
- William Passmore (boxer) (1915–1986), South African boxer

== See also ==
- Victor Pasmore (1908–1998), British artist
