= Pasmore =

Pasmore is a surname. Notable people with the surname include:

- John Pasmore, 16th-century English lawyer and politician
- Victor Pasmore (1908–1998), British artist
- Wendy Pasmore (1915–2015), British artist, wife of Victor

== See also ==
- Passmore (disambiguation)
