= Annie Armstrong (politician) =

Irish republican politician

Northern Ireland Forum Member
- In office 30 May 1996 – 25 April 1998
- Preceded by: New forum
- Succeeded by: Forum dissolved
- Constituency: Belfast West

Lisburn City Councillor
- In office 19 May 1993 – 21 May 1997
- Preceded by: William Beattie
- Succeeded by: Ita Gray
- Constituency: Dunmurry Cross

Personal details
- Born: Lower Springfield, Belfast, Northern Ireland
- Party: Sinn Féin
- Education: St Rose's Dominican College
- Occupation: Politician, community worker

Annie Armstrong is a former Irish republican politician.

== Background ==
Armstrong grew up on the Lower Springfield Road in West Belfast, and went to St Rose's Dominican College in Beechmount. She left school at fifteen.

After marrying, Armstrong moved to Twinbrook suburb of Belfast in 1974 and became a community worker in 1981. At the 1993 Northern Ireland local elections, she was elected for Sinn Féin to represent Dunmurry Cross on Lisburn City Council. In July 1993, Armstrong's home came under attack from loyalist paramilitaries in an attempt to kill her.

=== Political career ===
At the Northern Ireland Forum election in 1996, Armstrong was placed fourth on the Sinn Féin list for West Belfast, but was elected in their best result in Northern Ireland. She did not defend her council seat in 1997, and did not stand for the Northern Ireland Assembly in 1998.

=== Outside of politics ===
Outside politics, Armstrong established the Colin Community Forum, Colin Community Restorative Justice, Colin Health for All and Cumann na Fuiseoige GAA. She became a Director of Lisburn Strategic Partnership and the Colin Neighbourhood Initiative, and works as a Community Safety Project Worker with the Northern Ireland Association for the Care and Resettlement of Offenders. In 2008, she was appointed as an independent member of the District Policing Partnership.

Northern Ireland Forum
New forum	Member for West Belfast; 1996–1998	Forum dissolved
