= Norman Passmore =

American football coach

Biographical details
- Born: April 1, 1915; Columbus, Georgia, U.S.
- Died: March 16, 2003 (aged 87); East Chicago, Indiana, U.S.

Coaching career (HC unless noted)
- 1944: Kentucky State

Head coaching record
- Overall: 1–1

Norman L. Passmore Sr. (April 1, 1915 – March 16, 2003) was the seventh head football at the Kentucky State University in Frankfort, Kentucky, and held that position for the 1944 season. His career coaching record at Kentucky State 1–1.

Kentucky State did not field a team in 1943 and only had two games on the schedule in 1944. He also coached the Lexington Dunbar Bearcats from 1951 to around 1967. Passmore was an educator, serving as principal of a school in Kentucky. He also was a veteran of World War II as well as a pastor.

He died in 2003 of a heart attack.
