= Desmond Gillespie =

Irish nationalist politician

Desmond Gillespie (February 1912 – 22 May 1986) was an Irish nationalist politician.

Born in Kilnaleck, County Cavan, Gillespie worked as a publican in Belfast before joining the Social Democratic and Labour Party (SDLP). He stood for Belfast City Council at the 1973 local elections, but was not elected. However, he fared better at the 1973 Northern Ireland Assembly election, where he was elected to represent Belfast West. For the February 1974 UK general election, he moved to stand in Belfast East, but he took only 2.6% of the votes cast, and the SDLP decided not to stand any candidate in the seat at the October general election.

At the elections for the 1975 Northern Ireland Constitutional Convention, Gillespie stood in Belfast West again, but narrowly lost his seat to independent unionist Hugh Smyth. He did not contest any further elections.

Northern Ireland Assembly (1973)
New assembly	Assembly Member for West Belfast; 1973–1974	Assembly abolished
