= Paschal O'Hare =

Paschal J. O'Hare (25 March 1932 – 10 July 2013) was an Irish solicitor and Irish nationalist politician.

Born in County Antrim, O'Hare joined the Social Democratic and Labour Party (SDLP), and he narrowly missed out on being elected to the Northern Ireland Constitutional Convention for Belfast West. In 1977, he was elected to Belfast City Council, holding his seat in 1981. He was unsuccessful in the 1979 general election, where he took 18.5% of the vote in Belfast North.

O'Hare was finally successful in Belfast North in the election to the Northern Ireland Assembly, 1982. By this point, he was a member of the SDLP Executive. In 1986, he resigned from the party in protest at the Anglo-Irish Agreement, which he believed reinforced Northern Ireland's links with Britain and reduced the likelihood of a united Ireland; ironically most Unionists viewed the Agreement just the opposite, as a nationalist political victory which enhanced Dublin's role in Northern Ireland's affairs.

O'Hare also defended a number of prominent cases, including defending Gerard McLaverty (died 2008), who survived an attack by the Shankill Butchers. His firm of solicitors still remains active in Belfast.

Northern Ireland Assembly (1982)
New assembly	MPA for North Belfast; 1982–1986	Assembly abolished
