= Rosie McCorley =

Politician from Northern Ireland (born 1957)

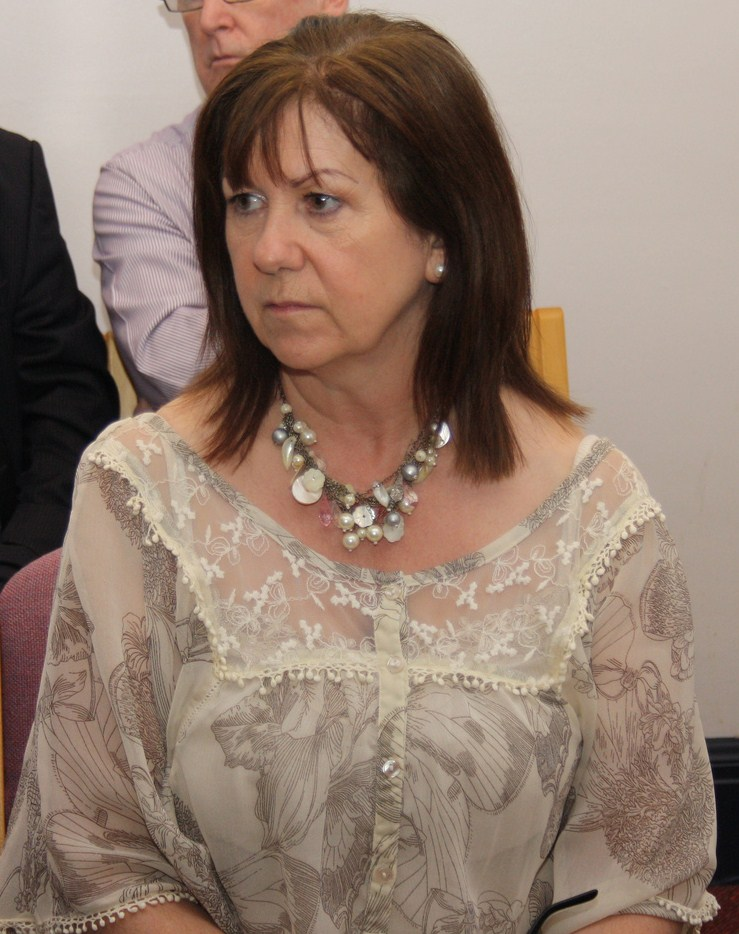

Member of the Northern Ireland Assembly for Belfast West
- In office 2 July 2012 – May 2016
- Preceded by: Paul Maskey
- Succeeded by: Gerry Carroll

Personal details
- Born: 14 January 1957 (age 69) Belfast, Northern Ireland
- Party: Sinn Féin
- Education: Open University; University of Ulster; Queen's University Belfast

Rosaleen "Rosie" McCorley (born 14 January 1957) is a former Irish Sinn Féin politician who was a Member of the Northern Ireland Assembly (MLA) for Belfast West from 2012 to 2016.

== Career ==
A former housing officer, in 1991, McCorley was jailed for 66 years for the attempted murder of an army officer and possession of explosives whilst she was a Provisional Irish Republican Army paramilitary. While in prison she obtained a first-class honours degree in social sciences with the Open University.

She served eight years of her sentence before being released under the terms of the Good Friday Agreement in 1998. She was the first female prisoner to be released following the agreement. After her release, she worked for Coiste na nIarchimí, an Irish republican ex-prisoners’ group, for eight years, before taking up a post as political adviser with Sinn Féin in 2007 working with MLAs Fra McCann and Pat Sheehan.

In July 2012, she replaced her party colleague Paul Maskey, an abstentionist MP in the parliament of the United Kingdom, who had resigned from the Northern Ireland Assembly as part of Sinn Féin's policy of abolishing double jobbing.

McCorley lost her seat at the 2016 Assembly election.

She holds a diploma in Irish from the University of Ulster and a post-graduate diploma in Gaeilge agus Léann an Aistriúcháin from Queen's University Belfast.

Northern Ireland Assembly
Preceded by Paul Maskey	MLA for Belfast West; 2012–2016	Succeeded by Gerry Carroll
