= Diane Dodds =

Northern Ireland politician (born 1958)

The Right Honourable The Lady Dodds of Duncairn MLA
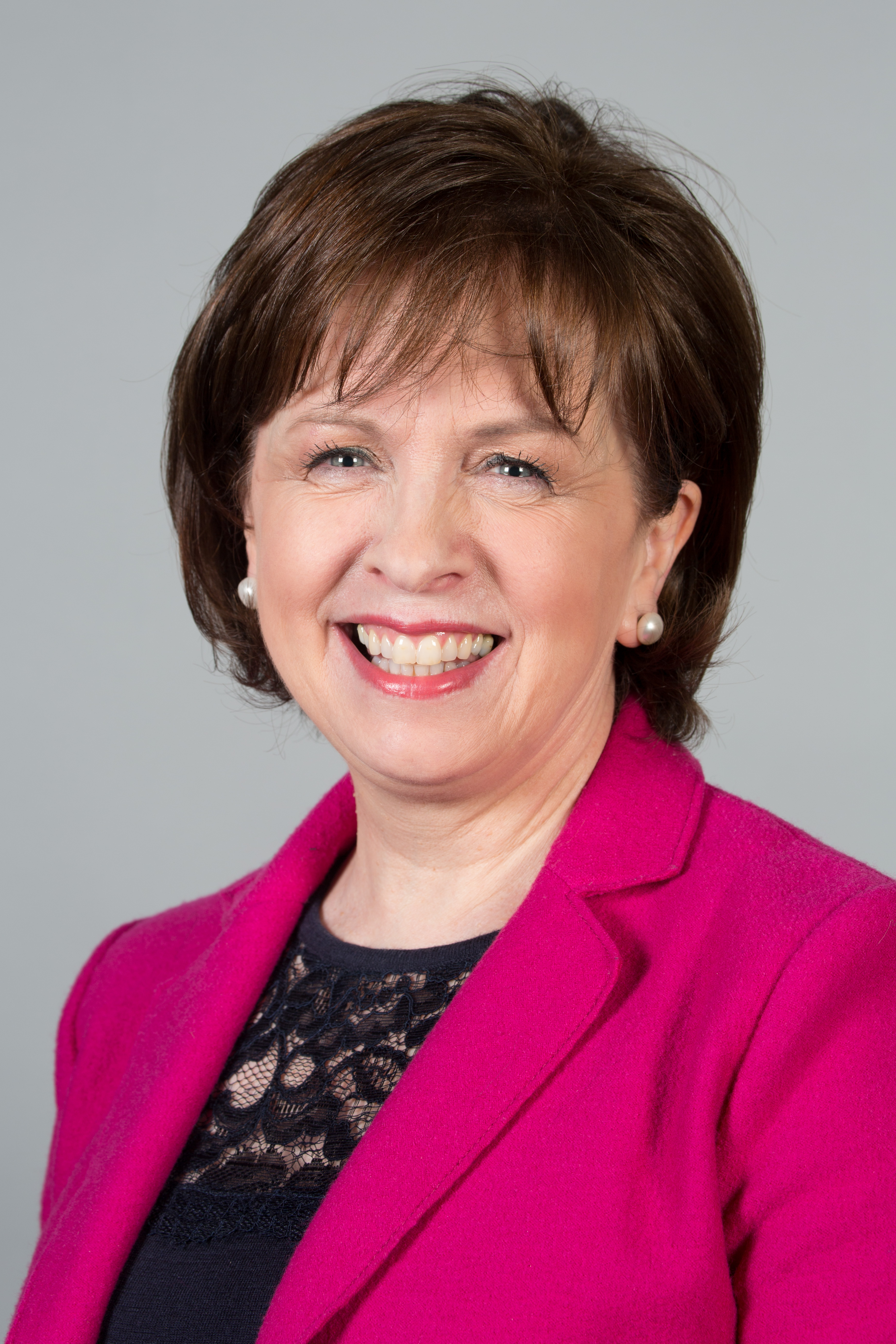
- Dodds in 2014

Minister for the Economy
- In office 11 January 2020 – 14 June 2021
- First Minister: Arlene Foster
- Preceded by: Simon Hamilton
- Succeeded by: Paul Frew

Member of the European Parliament for Northern Ireland
- In office 4 June 2009 – 31 January 2020
- Preceded by: Jim Allister
- Succeeded by: Constituency abolished

Member of the Legislative Assembly for Upper Bann
- Incumbent
- Assumed office 11 January 2020
- Preceded by: Carla Lockhart

Member of the Legislative Assembly for Belfast West
- In office 26 November 2003 – 7 March 2007
- Preceded by: Joe Hendron
- Succeeded by: Jennifer McCann

Member of Belfast City Council
- In office 5 May 2005 – 21 April 2010
- Preceded by: Eric Smyth
- Succeeded by: Brian Kingston
- Constituency: Court

Personal details
- Born: 16 August 1958 (age 68) Rathfriland, Northern Ireland
- Party: Democratic Unionist Party
- Spouse: Nigel, Lord Dodds of Duncairn
- Children: 3
- Education: Queen's University Belfast
- Profession: Teacher

Diane Jean Dodds, Baroness Dodds of Duncairn, MLA (born 16 August 1958), is a Democratic Unionist Party (DUP) politician in Northern Ireland. She served as a Member of the European Parliament (MEP) for the Northern Ireland constituency from 2009 to 2020. She previously sat in the Northern Ireland Assembly from 2003 to 2007 as MLA for West Belfast. In 2020, Dodds returned to the Assembly as MLA for Upper Bann and is the DUP's Spokesperson for Education and Skills. She is married to Lord Dodds of Duncairn, and as such she is styled as "The Right Honourable The Lady Dodds of Duncairn".

== Early life ==
Dodds was born into a farming family in Rathfriland, County Down, where she attended Banbridge Academy before moving on to study at Queen's University Belfast. While studying, she met her future husband and future DUP MP for North Belfast, Nigel Dodds.

== Political career ==
In 2003, Dodds was elected to the Northern Ireland Assembly to represent Belfast West. She was the first Unionist elected to a regional assembly from West Belfast in more than 20 years (the last being Thomas Passmore to the 1982–86 Assembly). Her strongest support base during the election campaign was in the Shankill Road area of the constituency.

Following her election to the Assembly, Dodds contested the Court District Electoral Area in the 2005 Local Government Elections. On that occasion she polled in excess of three electoral quotas and her surplus votes enabled the election of two running mates. In that election, she polled more votes than any other local government candidate in Northern Ireland. Despite increasing her vote from the 2003 Assembly election, she narrowly lost her seat to Sinn Féin in 2007.

Dodds has also been active within Belfast City Council, where she was Chief Whip of the 14-councillor DUP group. She chaired the Policy and Resources Committee on the council and actively supported a campaign to host a homecoming parade for the Royal Irish Regiment and other armed forces returning home from the Iraq and Afghanistan wars.

=== European Parliament 2009–2020 ===
On 3 February 2009, Dodds was selected by the DUP as its candidate for the 2009 election to the European Parliament and was elected an MEP on 8 June, representing Northern Ireland.

Despite her election, the results were disappointing for Dodds and her party. The DUP's share of the vote fell 14% to just over 18%. While the Westminster expenses scandal and a perceived poor performance in live debates were cited as reasons for the poor result, Dodds herself blamed the decline in DUP votes on former DUP member Jim Allister of the Traditional Unionist Voice (TUV) splinter party, who gained 66,000 first preference votes. Allister had accused the DUP of "betrayal" in going into government with Sinn Féin. Sinn Féin topped the poll, the first time a republican party had done so in a European election in Northern Ireland. Dodds was elected third, behind Jim Nicholson of the UUP, and with fewer votes than the quota (the elections being held under the single transferable vote system).

In September 2018, Dodds voted against a motion asserting the "existence of a clear risk of a serious breach by Hungary of the values on which the Union is founded" - in line with most UKIP and Conservative Party MEPs.

=== Northern Ireland Assembly 2020–present ===
The DUP announced that following Carla Lockhart's election to the House of Commons in December 2019, Dodds would succeed her as MLA for Upper Bann. In January 2020, Dodds was elected to the position of MLA for Upper Bann. She took on the MLA role full-time after the UK left the European Union (EU) on 31 January 2020.

Northern Ireland Assembly
Preceded by Joe Hendron	MLA for Belfast West; 2003–2007	Succeeded by Jennifer McCann
