= Joe Hendron =

Northern Irish politician

Member of the Legislative Assembly for Belfast West
- In office 25 June 1998 – 26 November 2003
- Preceded by: Office Created
- Succeeded by: Diane Dodds
- In office 20 October 1982 – 1986
- Preceded by: Assembly re-established
- Succeeded by: Assembly abolished

Member of Parliament for Belfast West
- In office 9 April 1992 – 8 April 1997
- Preceded by: Gerry Adams
- Succeeded by: Gerry Adams

Member of the Northern Ireland Forum for Belfast West
- In office 30 May 1996 – 25 April 1998
- Preceded by: Forum created
- Succeeded by: Forum dissolved

Member of Belfast City Council
- In office 15 May 1985 – 19 May 1993
- Preceded by: District created
- Succeeded by: Patsy McGeown
- Constituency: Lower Falls
- In office 20 May 1981 – 15 May 1985
- Preceded by: Liam Hunter
- Succeeded by: District abolished
- Constituency: Belfast Area D

Member of the Northern Ireland Constitutional Convention for Belfast West
- In office 1975–1976
- Preceded by: Convention created
- Succeeded by: Convention dissolved

Personal details
- Born: 12 November 1932 (age 93) Belfast, Northern Ireland
- Party: SDLP
- Spouse: Sally
- Children: 4
- Profession: Physician

Joseph Gerard Hendron (born 12 November 1932) is a Northern Ireland politician, a member of the centre-left Irish nationalist Social Democratic and Labour Party (SDLP).

== Background ==
Hendron, also a local GP physician for 40 years, was first elected as a political representative of Belfast West in 1975 to the Northern Ireland Constitutional Convention. He was later elected to Belfast City Council in 1981 and in 1982 to the Northern Ireland Assembly.

Hendron was the Member of Parliament (MP) for Belfast West between April 1992 and May 1997 in the UK Parliament in London. He had taken the seat from Sinn Féin President Gerry Adams at his third attempt with a majority of 1%. He became the only nationalist MP to defeat Adams. The seat had previously been held for the SDLP by Gerry Fitt (later Lord Fitt) until 1983. Hendron attracted unprecedented cross-community support from Nationalists and Unionists in the constituency. This was the only example where an SDLP candidate received a high enough number of Unionist votes in Belfast West to help unseat a Sinn Féin candidate. Adams regained the seat at the next election in May 1997.

In 1996, Hendron was elected to the Northern Ireland Forum and in 1998 to the newly reconvened Northern Ireland Assembly. However, he lost his seat in the 2003 Northern Ireland Assembly election to a member of Ian Paisley's Democratic Unionist Party.

He was appointed a member of the Northern Ireland Parades Commission in 2005. He retired from this role in December 2010.

== Bibliography ==
- Maiden Speech : House of Commons – 18 June 1992

Northern Ireland Constitutional Convention
New convention	Member for West Belfast; 1975–1976	Convention dissolved
Northern Ireland Assembly (1982)
New assembly	MPA for West Belfast; 1982–1986	Assembly abolished
Parliament of the United Kingdom
Preceded by Gerry Adams	Member of Parliament for Belfast West; 1992–1997	Succeeded by Gerry Adams
Northern Ireland Forum
New forum	Member for West Belfast; 1996–1998	Forum dissolved
Northern Ireland Assembly
New assembly	MLA for Belfast West; 1998–2003	Succeeded by Diane Dodds
