= Órlaithí Flynn =

Irish republican politician

Órlaithí Flynn MLA
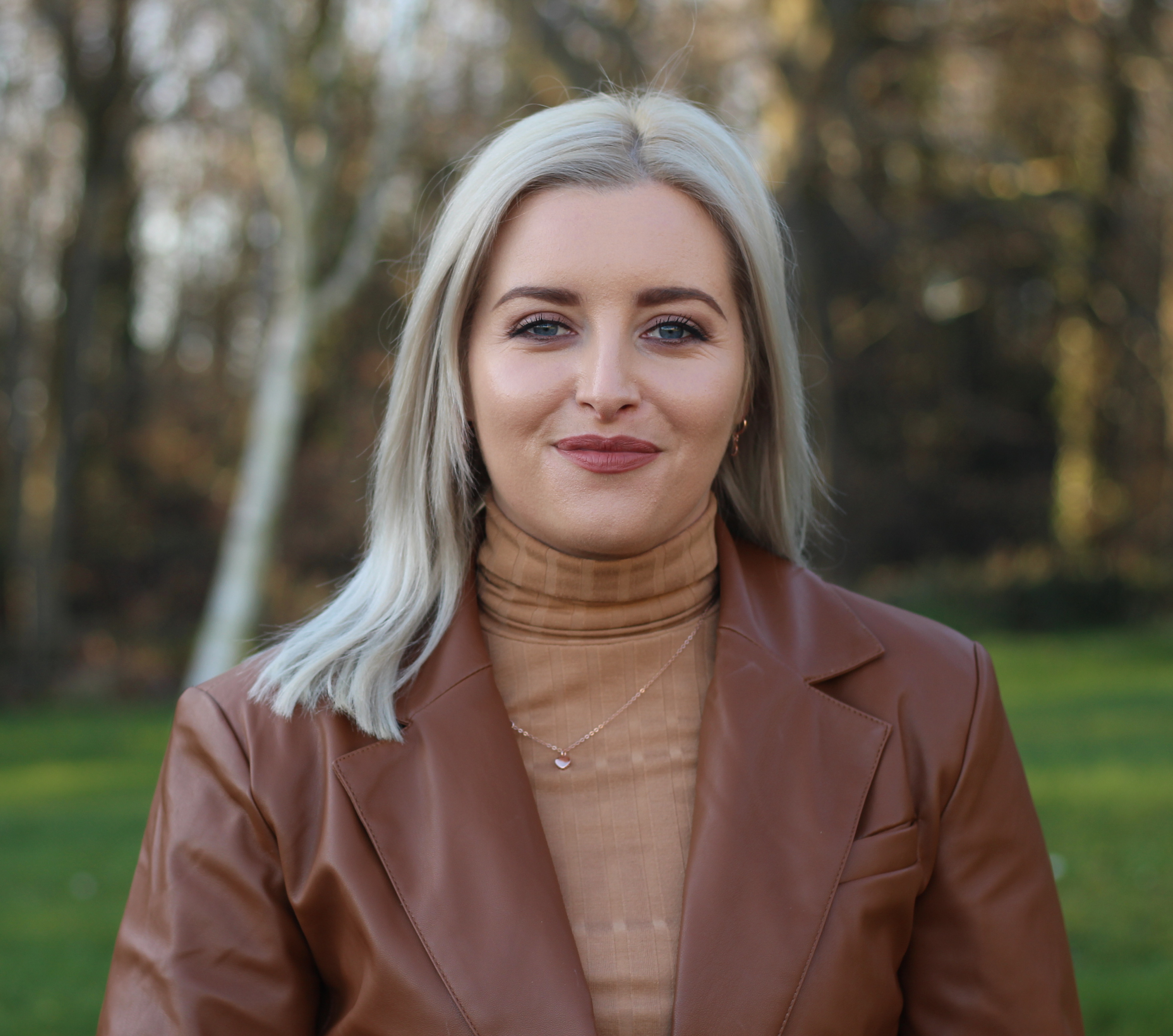
- Flynn in January 2022

Member of the Northern Ireland Assembly for Belfast West
- Incumbent
- Assumed office 7 December 2016
- Preceded by: Jennifer McCann

Personal details
- Born: Belfast, Northern Ireland
- Party: Sinn Féin

Órlaithí Flynn is an Irish politician and MLA who represents Belfast West in the Northern Ireland Assembly.

The daughter of Patrick Flynn, an Irish republican in West Belfast, Flynn was educated at St Dominic's Grammar School for Girls before studying politics at the University of Ulster. She then completed a master's degree in Irish politics at Queen's University Belfast.

Flynn joined Sinn Féin as a teenager. She worked as an adviser to a succession of politicians: Rosie McCorley, Sue Ramsey and, finally, Alex Maskey. In 2016, she was selected by the party to become a Member of the Legislative Assembly for Belfast West, replacing Jennifer McCann. Flynn was re-elected in the assembly elections of March 2017.

Northern Ireland Assembly
Preceded by Jennifer McCann	MLA for Belfast West; 2016–present	Incumbent
