= Belfast West (Assembly constituency) =

Constituency in the Northern Ireland Assembly

Coordinates: 54°35′11″N 6°00′06″W

- Parliamentary constituency for the Northern Ireland Assembly
- West Belfast shown within Northern Ireland

Current constituency
- Created: 1973
- Seats: 6 (1998–2016); 5 (2017–)
- MLAs: Danny Baker (SF); Gerry Carroll (PBP); Órlaithí Flynn (SF); Aisling Reilly (SF); Pat Sheehan (SF)
- City council: Belfast City Council

Belfast West is a constituency in the Northern Ireland Assembly.

It was first used for a Northern Ireland-only election in 1973, which elected the then Northern Ireland Assembly. It usually shares boundaries with the Belfast West UK Parliament constituency. However, the boundaries of the two constituencies were slightly different from 1973 to 1974, 1983 to 1986 and 2010 to 2011 (because the Assembly boundaries had not caught up with Parliamentary boundary changes) and from 1996 to 1997, when members of the Northern Ireland Forum had been elected from the newly drawn Parliamentary constituencies but the 51st Parliament of the United Kingdom, elected in 1992 under the 1983–95 constituency boundaries, was still in session.

Members were then elected from the constituency to the 1975 Constitutional Convention, the 1982 Assembly, the 1996 Forum and then to the current Assembly from 1998.

For further details of the history and boundaries of the constituency, see Belfast West (UK Parliament constituency).

== Members ==
Election	MLA (party)	MLA (party)	MLA (party)	MLA (party)	MLA (party)	MLA (party)
1973	Paddy Devlin (SDLP)	Desmond Gillespie (SDLP)	Hugh Smyth (Independent Unionist)	Bob Cooper (Alliance Party)	John Laird (UUP)	Jean Coulter (Vanguard/UUP)
1975	Paddy Devlin (SDLP)	Joe Hendron (SDLP)	Hugh Smyth (Independent Unionist)	Bob Cooper (Alliance Party)	John Laird (UUP)	Jean Coulter (Vanguard/UUP)
1982	4 seats 1982–1996	Joe Hendron (SDLP)	Gerry Adams (Sinn Féin)	Will Glendinning (Alliance)	Thomas Passmore (UUP)	4 seats 1982–1996
1996	5 seats 1996–1998	Joe Hendron (SDLP)	Gerry Adams (Sinn Féin)	Alex Maskey (Sinn Féin)	Dodie McGuinness (Sinn Féin)	Annie Armstrong (Sinn Féin)
1998	Alex Attwood (SDLP)	Joe Hendron (SDLP)	Gerry Adams (Sinn Féin)	Alex Maskey (Sinn Féin)	Bairbre de Brún (Sinn Féin)	Sue Ramsey (Sinn Féin)
2003	Alex Attwood (SDLP)	Diane Dodds (DUP)	Gerry Adams (Sinn Féin)	Fra McCann (Sinn Féin)	Bairbre de Brún (Sinn Féin)	Michael Ferguson (Sinn Féin)
November 2004 co-option	Alex Attwood (SDLP)	Diane Dodds (DUP)	Gerry Adams (Sinn Féin)	Fra McCann (Sinn Féin)	Sue Ramsey (Sinn Féin)	Michael Ferguson (Sinn Féin)
September 2006 death	Alex Attwood (SDLP)	Diane Dodds (DUP)	Gerry Adams (Sinn Féin)	Fra McCann (Sinn Féin)	Sue Ramsey (Sinn Féin)	Vacant
2007	Alex Attwood (SDLP)	Paul Maskey (Sinn Féin)	Gerry Adams (Sinn Féin)	Fra McCann (Sinn Féin)	Sue Ramsey (Sinn Féin)	Jennifer McCann (Sinn Féin)
December 2010 co-option	Alex Attwood (SDLP)	Paul Maskey (Sinn Féin)	Pat Sheehan (Sinn Féin)	Fra McCann (Sinn Féin)	Sue Ramsey (Sinn Féin)	Jennifer McCann (Sinn Féin)
2011	Alex Attwood (SDLP)	Paul Maskey (Sinn Féin)	Pat Sheehan (Sinn Féin)	Fra McCann (Sinn Féin)	Sue Ramsey (Sinn Féin)	Jennifer McCann (Sinn Féin)
July 2012 co-option	Alex Attwood (SDLP)	Rosie McCorley (Sinn Féin)	Pat Sheehan (Sinn Féin)	Fra McCann (Sinn Féin)	Sue Ramsey (Sinn Féin)	Jennifer McCann (Sinn Féin)
November 2014 co-option	Alex Attwood (SDLP)	Rosie McCorley (Sinn Féin)	Pat Sheehan (Sinn Féin)	Fra McCann (Sinn Féin)	Alex Maskey (Sinn Féin)	Jennifer McCann (Sinn Féin)
2016	Alex Attwood (SDLP)	Gerry Carroll (PBP)	Pat Sheehan (Sinn Féin)	Fra McCann (Sinn Féin)	Alex Maskey (Sinn Féin)	Jennifer McCann (Sinn Féin)
December 2016 co-option	Alex Attwood (SDLP)	Gerry Carroll (PBP)	Pat Sheehan (Sinn Féin)	Fra McCann (Sinn Féin)	Alex Maskey (Sinn Féin)	Órlaithí Flynn (Sinn Féin)
2017	5 seats 2017–present	Gerry Carroll (PBP)	Pat Sheehan (Sinn Féin)	Fra McCann (Sinn Féin)	Alex Maskey (Sinn Féin)	Órlaithí Flynn (Sinn Féin)
October 2021 co-option	5 seats 2017–present	Gerry Carroll (PBP)	Pat Sheehan (Sinn Féin)	Aisling Reilly (Sinn Féin)	Alex Maskey (Sinn Féin)	Órlaithí Flynn (Sinn Féin)
2022	5 seats 2017–present	Gerry Carroll (PBP)	Pat Sheehan (Sinn Féin)	Aisling Reilly (Sinn Féin)	Danny Baker (Sinn Féin)	Órlaithí Flynn (Sinn Féin)

Note: The columns in this table are used only for presentational purposes, and no significance should be attached to the order of columns. For details of the order in which seats were won at each election, see the detailed results of that election.

== Elections ==
=== Northern Ireland Assembly ===
==== 2027 ====
2027 Assembly election: Belfast West – 5 seats
Party	Candidate	FPv%	Count
Party	Candidate	FPv%	1
Sinn Féin	Paul Maskey		
Sinn Féin	Pat Sheehan		
Sinn Féin	Órlaithí Flynn		
Sinn Féin	Danny Baker		
DUP	Frank McCoubrey		
SDLP	Gerard McDonald		
Independent	Paul Doherty		

==== 2022 ====
2022 Assembly election: Belfast West – 5 seats
Party	Candidate	FPv%	Count										
Party	Candidate	FPv%	1	2	3	4	5	6	7	8	9	10	11
Sinn Féin	**Danny Baker**	20.64%	**9,011**										
Sinn Féin	**Órlaithí Flynn**	15.44%	6,743	7,087	7,093	7,109	7,136	7,159	7,159	7,160	7,228	**7,407**	
Sinn Féin	**Aisling Reilly**	13.01%	5,681	6,709	6,720	6,727	6,745	6,759	6,761	6,761	6,812	7,131	**7,664**
Sinn Féin	**Pat Sheehan**	14.59%	6,370	6,422	6,426	6,431	6,440	6,449	6,449	6,450	6,477	6,735	**7,186**
People Before Profit	**Gerry Carroll**	7.51%	3,279	3,394	3,414	3,492	3,563	3,667	3,688	3,698	3,936	4,479	**6,023**
DUP	Frank McCoubrey	9.54%	4,166	4,167	4,174	4,174	4,176	4,180	4,396	5,199	5,275	5,429	5,490
SDLP	Paul Doherty	5.79%	2,528	2,616	2,619	2,648	2,684	2,727	2,744	2,754	3,232	3,636	
Aontú	Gerard Herdman	4.01%	1,753	1,761	1,793	1,802	1,820	1,823	1,829	1,837	1,871		
Irish Republican Socialist	Dan Murphy	2.53%	1,103	1,115	1,123	1,130	1,144	1,152	1,152	1,152	1,159		
Alliance	Donnamarie Higgins	2.08%	907	924	926	932	940	1,027	1,109	1,135			
TUV	Jordan Doran	1.84%	802	802	805	806	809	810	918				
UUP	Linsey Gibson	1.09%	474	475	477	478	480	484					
Green (NI)	Stevie Maginn	0.70%	307	310	313	323	333						
Independent	Gerard Burns	0.44%	192	209	237	244							
Workers' Party	Patrick Crossan	0.44%	193	198	205								
Independent	Tony Mallon	0.30%	129	131									
Independent	Declan Hill	0.06%	26	26									
Electorate: 68,727 Valid: 43,664 (63.53%) Spoilt: 776 Quota: 7,278 Turnout: 44,440 (64.66%)

==== 2017 ====
2017 Assembly election: Belfast West – 5 seats
Party	Candidate	FPv%	Count			
Party	Candidate	FPv%	1	2	3	4
Sinn Féin	**Órlaithí Flynn**	17.15%	**6,918**			
People Before Profit	**Gerry Carroll**	12.15%	4,903	6,514	**8,252**	
Sinn Féin	**Alex Maskey**	15.73%	6,346	6,451	**7,036**	
Sinn Féin	**Fra McCann**	15.37%	6,201	6,314	6,636	**7,067**
Sinn Féin	**Pat Sheehan**	13.55%	5,466	5,515	5,739	**5,903**
DUP	Frank McCoubrey	10.07%	4,063	4,372	4,490	4,521
SDLP	Alex Attwood	8.56%	3,452	4,019		
People Before Profit	Michael Collins	2.72%	1,096			
Alliance	Sorcha Eastwood	1.85%	747			
UUP	Fred Rogers	1.20%	486			
Workers' Party	Conor Campbell	1.03%	415			
Green (NI)	Ellen Murray	0.62%	251			
Electorate: 61,309 Valid: 40,344 (65.80%) Spoilt: 586 Quota: 6,725 Turnout: 40,930 (66.76%)

==== 2016 ====
2016 Assembly election: Belfast West – 6 seats
Party	Candidate	FPv%	Count							
Party	Candidate	FPv%	1	2	3	4	5	6	7	8
People Before Profit	**Gerry Carroll**	22.88%	**8,299**							
Sinn Féin	**Alex Maskey**	13.15%	4,769	**5,360.8**						
Sinn Féin	**Pat Sheehan**	9.69%	3,516	3,761.08	3,829.2	**6,393.2**				
Sinn Féin	**Fra McCann**	11.11%	4,028	4,283.2	4,479.48	4,756.68	**5,891.73**			
Sinn Féin	**Jennifer McCann**	12.09%	4,386	4,648.68	4,755.04	4,988.88	5,044.81	**5,750.11**		
SDLP	**Alex Attwood**	7.30%	2,647	3,407.76	4,161.36	4,234.52	4,242.98	4,245.38	4,299.08	**4,430.2**
DUP	Frank McCoubrey	10.38%	3,766	3,780.52	4,332.28	4,336.28	4,337.69	4,337.69	4,337.69	4,341.21
Sinn Féin	Rosie McCorley	8.42%	3,053	3,244.4	3,303.24					
Workers' Party	Conor Campbell	1.47%	532	766.54						
Green (NI)	Ellen Murray	0.90%	327	705.84						
UUP	Gareth Martin	1.80%	654	668.96						
Alliance	Jemima Higgins	0.80%	291	427.4						
Electorate: 63,993 Valid: 36,268 (56.67%) Spoilt: 722 Quota: 5,182 Turnout: 36,990 (57.80%)

==== 2011 ====
2011 Assembly election: Belfast West – 6 seats
Party	Candidate	FPv%	Count										
Party	Candidate	FPv%	1	2	3	4	5	6	7	8	9	10	11
Sinn Féin	**Paul Maskey**	15.42%	**5,343**										
Sinn Féin	**Jennifer McCann**	15.12%	**5,239**										
Sinn Féin	**Fra McCann**	12.93%	4,481	4,587.96	4,604.96	4,613.08	4,645.5	4,682.6	4,735.84	4,837.22	4,838.34	**5,167.34**	
SDLP	**Alex Attwood**	10.87%	3,765	3,776.69	3,780.09	3,787.09	3,890.45	3,939.62	4,083.74	4,719.58	4,780.65	**5,151.65**	
Sinn Féin	**Sue Ramsey**	11.88%	4,116	4,340.28	4,350.88	4,358.19	4,377.4	4,394.47	4,407.47	4,423.94	4,433.99	4,683.9	**4,823.06**
Sinn Féin	**Pat Sheehan**	10.75%	3,723	3,737.35	3,960.5	3,971.78	3,996.39	4,016.61	4,029.73	4,051.85	4,054.9	4,249.77	**4,327.19**
DUP	Brian Kingston	7.47%	2,587	2,587.28	2,587.33	2,587.33	2,600.45	2,604.45	2,607.45	2,617.57	3,834.57	3,866.57	3,866.57
People Before Profit	Gerry Carroll	4.79%	1,661	1,664.85	1,665.85	1,701.85	1,732.85	1,853.97	1,939.09	1,977.31	1,999.31		
UUP	Bill Manwaring	4.25%	1,471	1,471.21	1,471.36	1,473.36	1,503.41	1,512.41	1,517.41	1,526.41			
SDLP	Colin Keenan	2.31%	802	803.26	804.41	807.41	853.58	878.63	981.82				
Workers' Party	John Lowry	1.69%	586	586.63	587.03	590.1	607.24	644.38					
Socialist Party	Pat Lawlor	1.11%	384	384.42	384.92	399.92	408.92						
Alliance	Dan McGuinness	1.05%	365	367.66	368.76	370.76							
Independent	Brian Pelan	0.35%	122	122.77	122.92								
Electorate: 61,520 Valid: 34,645 (56.32%) Spoilt: 973 Quota: 4,950 Turnout: 35,618 (57.90%)

==== 2007 ====
2007 Assembly election: Belfast West – 6 seats
Party	Candidate	FPv%	Count					
Party	Candidate	FPv%	1	2	3	4	5	6
Sinn Féin	**Gerry Adams**	17.84%	**6,029**					
Sinn Féin	**Sue Ramsey**	13.95%	4,715	**5,266.6**				
Sinn Féin	**Paul Maskey**	12.93%	4,368	4,758.6	4,774.05	4,783.95	4,821.8	**5,074.8**
Sinn Féin	**Jennifer McCann**	12.62%	4,265	4,294.8	4,665.75	4,667.7	4,693.5	**4,848.5**
SDLP	**Alex Attwood**	8.98%	3,036	3,148.8	3,149.7	3,196.9	3,234.9	**4,779.1**
Sinn Féin	**Fra McCann**	12.59%	4,254	4,323.8	4,344.95	4,353.8	4,378	**4,646.85**
DUP	Diane Dodds	10.83%	3,661	3,661	3,661.15	3,671.15	3,677.15	4,166
SDLP	Margaret Walsh	3.18%	1,074	1,086.2	1,087.1	1,110.3	1,156.5	
People Before Profit	Seán Mitchell	2.29%	774	789	789.6	830.4	968.8	
UUP	Louis West	1.65%	558	558.8	558.8	579.8	581.8	
Workers' Party	John Lowry	1.28%	434	440	440.45	452.65	452.65	
Republican Sinn Féin	Geraldine Taylor	1.26%	427	429	429.45	437.05		
Alliance	Dan McGuinness	0.38%	127	132.4	133.3			
Make Politicians History	Rainbow George	0.20%	68	69	69			
Electorate: 50,792 Valid: 33,790 (66.53%) Spoilt: 448 Quota: 4,828 Turnout: 34,238 (67.41%)

Note: All Republican Sinn Féin candidates appeared as Independent on the ballot paper.

==== 2003 ====
2003 Assembly election: Belfast West – 6 seats
Party	Candidate	FPv%	Count							
Party	Candidate	FPv%	1	2	3	4	5	6	7	8
Sinn Féin	**Gerry Adams**	18.87%	**6,199**							
SDLP	**Alex Attwood**	11.16%	3,667	3,796.60	3,901.04	3,956.28	**6,096.28**			
Sinn Féin	**Bairbre de Brún**	12.39%	4,069	4,476.52	4,494.96	4,504.20	4,665.68	**5,229.68**		
Sinn Féin	**Fra McCann**	12.98%	4,263	4,337.16	4,360.88	4,363.36	4,525.00	**4,905.00**		
Sinn Féin	**Michael Ferguson**	11.72%	3,849	3,912.84	3,921.56	3,945.12	4,000.00	4,117.00	4,346.00	**4,448.60**
DUP	**Diane Dodds**	7.74%	2,544	2,544.00	2,631.00	4,144.24	4,256.24	4,272.24	4,274.24	**4,277.09**
Sinn Féin	Sue Ramsey	9.09%	2,988	3,673.20	3,699.68	3,705.92	3,768.84	3,923.84	4,084.84	4,190.29
SDLP	Joe Hendron	7.86%	2,583	2,654.28	2,849.72	3,108.72				
UUP	Chris McGimpsey	3.56%	1,170	1,174.56	1,298.56					
PUP	Hugh Smyth	2.47%	813	814.68	862.68					
Workers' Party	John Lowry	1.24%	407	410.84						
Independent	John MacVicar	0.64%	211	211.24						
Alliance	Mary Ayers	0.23%	75	78.12						
Independent	David Kerr	0.05%	16	16.00						
Electorate: 50,861 Valid: 32,854 (64.60%) Spoilt: 673 Quota: 4,694 Turnout: 33,527 (65.92%)

Note: David Kerr sought election as an Ulster Third Way candidate, and appeared as such on the ballot paper.

==== 1998 ====
1998 Assembly election: Belfast West – 6 seats
Party	Candidate	FPv%	Count									
Party	Candidate	FPv%	1	2	3	4	5	6	7	8	9	10
Sinn Féin	**Gerry Adams**	21.72%	**9,078**									
SDLP	**Joe Hendron**	14.69%	**6,140**									
Sinn Féin	**Sue Ramsey**	9.44%	3,946	5,223.15	5,235	5,236.44	5,253.27	5,262.62	5,276.34	**7,371.34**		
Sinn Féin	**Bairbre de Brún**	11.27%	4,711	5,341	5,381.35	5,383.83	5,405.11	5,409.11	5,421.89	5,705.26	**6,993.67**	
Sinn Féin	**Alex Maskey**	10.36%	4,330	4,831.2	4,852.35	4,856.41	4,889.2	4,901.27	4,909.82	5,242.2	5,324.61	**6,328.43**
SDLP	**Alex Attwood**	10.24%	4,280	4,647.85	4,738.25	4,838.85	5,117.87	5,127.22	5,234.49	5,327.61	5,343.69	**5,349.52**
UUP	Chris McGimpsey	3.92%	1,640	1,641.4	1,674.4	1,675.58	1,808.99	2,757.44	4,827.29	4,837.64	4,837.64	4,837.64
Sinn Féin	Michael Ferguson	6.19%	2,585	2,791.85	2,838.45	2,840.71	2,867.12	2,871.84	2,896.95			
PUP	Hugh Smyth	5.22%	2,180	2,186.65	2,206.75	2,208.63	2,342.94	2,716.06				
DUP	Margaret Ferris	3.22%	1,345	1,347.8	1,354.5	1,354.8	1,784.22					
UK Unionist	Thomas Dalzell-Sheridan	1.59%	666	671.25	677.25	677.37						
Workers' Party	John Lowry	1.45%	607	630.1	658.8	660.68						
Alliance	Dan McGuinness	0.31%	129	165.4								
Independent	Mary Cahillane	0.31%	128	151.8								
Natural Law	Michael Kennedy	0.07%	29	31.45								
Electorate: 60,669 Valid: 41,794 (68.89%) Spoilt: 960 Quota: 5,971 Turnout: 42,754 (70.47%)

Note: Mary Cahillane sought election as a Pro-Agreement Socialist candidate, and appeared as such on the ballot paper.

=== 1996 forum ===
Successful candidates are shown in bold.

Party	Candidate(s)	Votes	Percentage
Sinn Féin	**Gerry Adams**; **Dodie McGuinness**; **Alex Maskey**; **Annie Armstrong**; Marie Moore	22,355	53.4
SDLP	**Joe Hendron**; Alex Attwood; Margaret Walsh; Patricia Lewsley; Mary Muldoon	11,087	26.5
PUP	Hugh Smyth; Mina Wardle	1,982	4.7
DUP	Eric Smyth; Margaret Ferris	1,769	4.2
UUP	Fred Parkinson; John McDonald	1,489	3.6
Workers' Party	John Lowry; Jim Pollock	984	2.4
Ulster Democratic	Frank McCoubrey; Delwyn Williams	848	2.0
Alliance	Dan McGuinness; Patricia Mallon; Glyn Roberts	340	0.8
Labour coalition	Mary Cahillane; Isabel Cowan; Barbara Lynn; Brian McDermott; Terence McDonagh	319	0.8
NI Women's Coalition	Vera McKee; Mary Catney; Ann Hall; Julie Cullen	252	0.6
Green (NI)	Jude Stephens; Philip Kearney; David Taylor	156	0.4
NI Conservatives	Charles Balmer; David Munster	60	0.1
Independent DUP	Florence Baxter; William Clements	36	0.1
Ulster Independence	Kenneth McClinton; Clifford Peoples	43	0.1
Democratic Left	Mary McMahon; Freddie Rea	37	0.1
Natural Law	Michael Kennedy; Vivien Martin	30	0.1
Communist	Barry Bruton; Daniella Egerton	28	0.1
Independent Voice	Bernard McGrath; Susan McGrath	26	0.1
Independent Chambers	Ruth Patty; Richard Stewart	12	0.0

=== 1982 ===
1982 Assembly election: Belfast West – 4 seats
Party	Candidate	FPv%	Count							
Party	Candidate	FPv%	1	2	3	4	5	6	7	8
Sinn Féin	**Gerry Adams**	28.43%	**9,740**							
SDLP	**Joe Hendron**	15.20%	5,207	5,309.3	6,003.3	**7,965.3**				
UUP	**Thomas Passmore**	13.15%	4,505	4,505	4,509	5,128	5,130	5,131.86	5,151.79	**5,165.55**
Alliance	**Will Glendinning**	7.98%	2,733	2,764.5	2,805.1	2,847.1	3,072.7	3,651.16	4,525.99	**5,163.2**
DUP	Billy Dickson	12.83%	4,394	4,396.1	4,399.1	4,849.4	4,866.4	4,869.09	4,892.81	4,918.6
Sinn Féin	Alex Maskey	1.83%	627	3,240	3,326.2	3,326.2	3,397.6	3,565.93	3,824.22	
Workers' Party	Mary McMahon	7.28%	2,493	2,512.8	2,566.9	2,580.9	2,662.8	3,017.13		
SDLP	Cormac Boomer	6.26%	2,145	2,204.4	2,452.5	2,454.5				
PUP	Hugh Smyth	3.66%	1,255	1,255.3	1,256.3					
SDLP	Mary Muldoon	2.97%	1,016	1,024.1						
People's Democracy	John McAnulty	0.42%	144	161.1						
Electorate: 57,726 Valid: 34,259 (59.35%) Spoilt: 1,819 Quota: 6,852 Turnout: 36,078 (62.50%)

=== 1975 Constitutional Convention ===
1975 Constitutional Convention: Belfast West – 6 seats
Party	Candidate	FPv%	Count							
Party	Candidate	FPv%	1	2	3	4	5	6	7	8
UUP	**John Laird**	23.61%	**8,433**							
SDLP	**Paddy Devlin**	17.54%	**6,267**							
UUP	**Jean Coulter**	6.51%	2,325	4,209.48	4,209.48	4,226.65	4,235.65	**5,710.65**		
Alliance	**Bob Cooper**	9.22%	3,293	3,362.81	3,495.11	3,679.76	4,341.58	4,428.25	4,472.89	**4,915.13**
SDLP	**Joe Hendron**	7.95%	2,840	2,841.56	3,058.82	3,180.76	3,607.5	3,611.04	3,611.66	**4,901.95**
Ind. Unionist	**Hugh Smyth**	7.40%	2,644	3,235.63	3,236.35	3,252.92	3,256.31	4,127.8	4,684.56	**4,693.55**
SDLP	Desmond Gillespie	5.56%	1,986	1,988.73	2,506.59	2,652.23	3,254.1	3,257.1	3,257.72	4,513.76
SDLP	Paschal O'Hare	6.86%	2,452	2,453.95	2,578.87	2,691.07	3,115.67	3,118.63	3,121.11	
DUP	Edith Goligher	5.48%	1,958	2,668.19	2,669.63	2,686.41	2,688.59			
Ind. Nationalist	Thomas Conaty	5.74%	2,052	2,052.78	2,133.96	2,302.18				
Republican Clubs	John Sullivan	1.85%	660	661.17	676.29					
Republican Clubs	John Brady	1.17%	418	418.78	432.82					
Republican Clubs	Bernard McDonagh	0.73%	262	263.17	268.21					
Communist	John Morris	0.24%	86	86	87.62					
Communist	Peter Kerrins	0.12%	44	44.78	45.5					
Electorate: 63,869 Valid: 35,720 (55.93%) Spoilt: 1,794 Quota: 5,103 Turnout: 37,514 (58.74%)

Note: John Laird, Jean Coulter and Edith Goligher were all UUUC endorsed candidates.

=== 1973 ===
1973 Assembly election: Belfast West – 6 seats
Party	Candidate	FPv%	Count											
Party	Candidate	FPv%	1	2	3	4	5	6	7	8	9	10	11	12
UUP	**John Laird**	27.74%	**11,479**											
SDLP	**Paddy Devlin**	18.71%	**7,743**											
Ind. Unionist	**Hugh Smyth**	8.76%	3,625	**5,997.09**										
Vanguard	**Jean Coulter**	4.27%	1,765	3,606.42	3,606.42	3,634.31	3,638.3	3,704.33	3,707.56	5,610.71	**6,281.71**			
Alliance	**Bob Cooper**	7.64%	3,160	3,262.9	3,374.22	3,374.89	3,382.61	3,637.01	3,810.76	3,866.68	5,042.61	5,221.61	5,378.06	**5,597.46**
SDLP	**Desmond Gillespie**	4.69%	1,940	1,940	2,520.29	2,520.3	2,527.93	2,590.38	2,953	2,953.49	2,993.58	2,994.58	3,404.51	**4,961.35**
SDLP	Gerry Campbell	4.26%	1,764	1,764.49	2,269.34	2,268.35	2,277.35	2,325.48	2,698.95	2,699.95	2,835.67	2,837.67	3,320.88	4,399.77
SDLP	Desmond O'Donnell	5.10%	2,112	2,113.47	2,341.17	2,321.17	2,353.40	2,394.93	2,734.28	2,734.78	2,763.39	2,764.39	3,037.25	
Republican Clubs	Raymond O'Hagan	3.36%	1,389	1,389	1,438.91	1,438.91	1,465.37	2,134.58	2,537.47	2,538.47	2,563.1	2,564.1		
NI Labour	Billy Boyd	4.69%	1,942	2,204.15	2,214.73	2,216.67	2,237.9	2,333.56	2,388.08	2,538.1				
DUP	William Spence	3.30%	1,366	2,270.05	2,270.05	2,286.85	2,293.62	2,236.4	2,239.4					
Republican Labour	Paddy Kennedy	4.23%	1,750	1,750.49	1,970.37	1,970.37	1,984.6	2,036.94						
Republican Clubs	John O'Hare	1.70%	702	703.47	715.43	715.44	725.44							
Alliance	Reginald Donnelly	0.47%	194	202.33	223.49	223.51	225							
Alliance	Maureen Smyth	0.41%	169	232.7	238.22	238.67	242.67							
NI Labour	Patrick Doherty	0.36%	151	152.47	172.02	172.03	174.03							
Communist	James Stewart	0.30%	123	130.35	131.96	132.2								
Electorate: 70,791 Valid: 41,374 (58.45%) Spoilt: 2,834 Quota: 5,911 Turnout: 44,208 (62.45%)

Note: John Laird, Hugh Smyth, Jean Coulter and William Spence used the label "West Belfast Loyalist Coalition" simultaneously whilst standing under different party affiliations.

== Sources ==
- Northern Ireland ELECTIONS: West Belfast
- Northern Ireland ELECTIONS: West Belfast 1973–82
