= Alex Attwood =

Irish SDLP politician

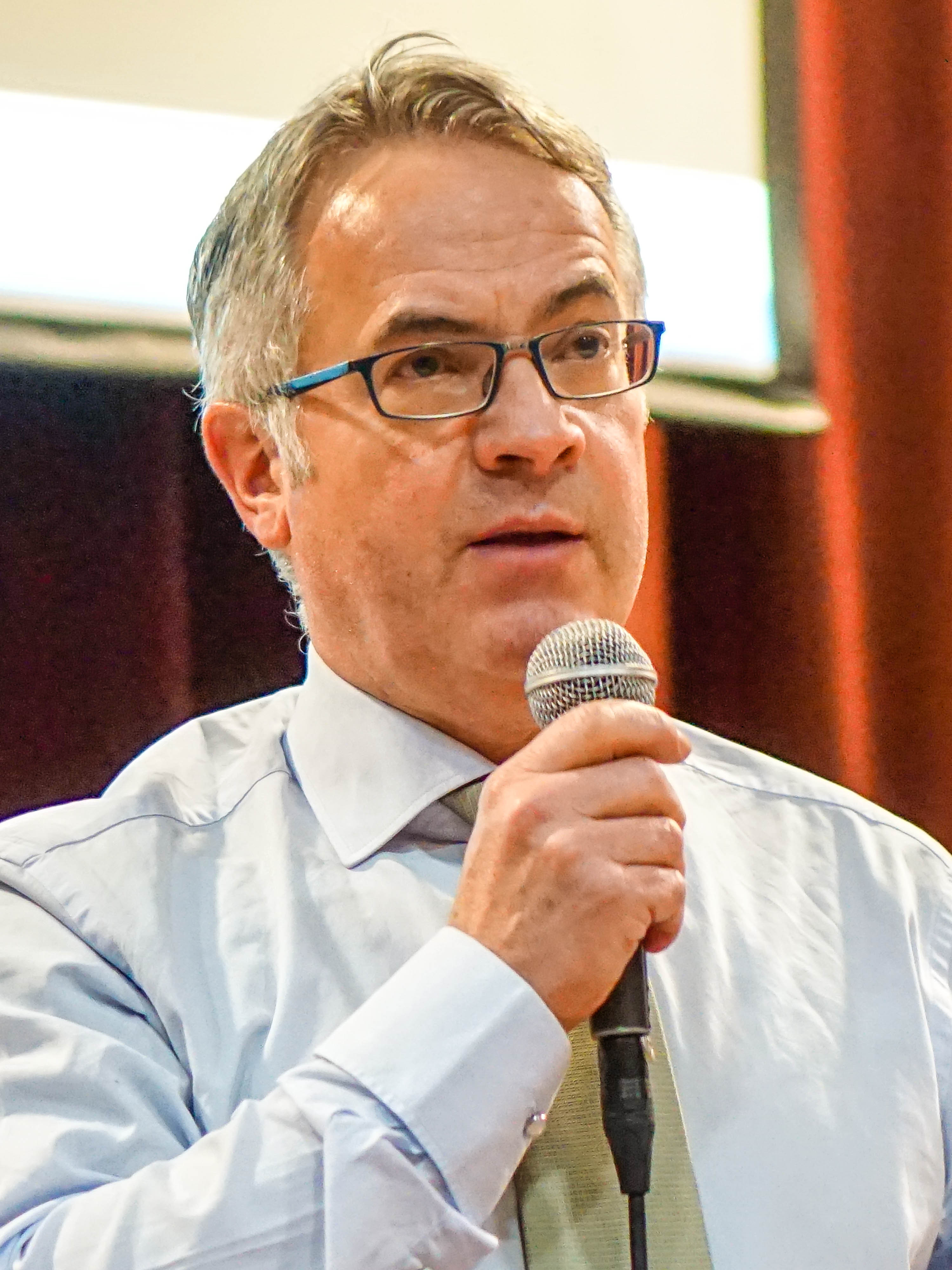
- Attwood in 2015

Minister of the Environment
- In office 6 May 2011 – 16 July 2013
- Preceded by: Edwin Poots
- Succeeded by: Mark H. Durkan

Minister for Social Development
- In office 7 February 2010 – 6 May 2011
- Preceded by: Margaret Ritchie
- Succeeded by: Nelson McCausland

Member of the Legislative Assembly for Belfast West
- In office 25 June 1998 – 26 January 2017
- Preceded by: Constituency created
- Succeeded by: Seat abolished

Personal details
- Born: 26 April 1959 (age 67) Belfast, Northern Ireland
- Party: SDLP
- Spouse: Orla Attwood
- Education: Queen's University Belfast
- Profession: Solicitor
- Website: Alex Attwood SDLP

Alexander Gerard Attwood (born 26 April 1959) is an Irish Electoral officer and former Social Democratic and Labour Party (SDLP) politician who served as Minister for Social Development from 2010 to 2011, and Minister for Environment in the Northern Ireland Executive from 2011 to 2013. Atwood served as a Member of the Legislative Assembly (MLA) for Belfast West from 1998 to 2017.

== Early career ==
Educated at Queen's University, Belfast, where he served as President of the Students' Union, he later became a practising solicitor. Attwood was a member of Belfast City Council for the Upper Falls DEA, in West Belfast, from 1985 to 2001. He was a former leader of the SDLP Belfast City Council Group. In 1996 he was an unsuccessful candidate in the Northern Ireland Forum election in West Belfast. In 1997, he participated in negotiations for the first Nationalist Mayor of Belfast, having failed to secure his own nomination for the post within his political grouping.

In 1997, he was appointed by John Hume to the Dublin Forum for Peace and Reconciliation. Attwood was a member of the SDLP Talks Team, playing a key negotiating role on policing, human rights and justice issues. He was elected to Northern Ireland Assembly in June 1998. Attwood was the SDLP spokesperson on policing and has played a key role in negotiations on the Policing Bill. He was appointed to the Northern Ireland Policing Board in September 2001.

In May 2010, he succeeded Margaret Ritchie as Minister for Social Development. In May 2011, he was appointed as Minister for Environment, succeeding Edwin Poots. As Environment Minister, he has faced some opposition when trying to set up two national parks in Northern Ireland from the Ulster Farmer's Union. The president of the UFU, Harry Sinclair, said: "We have consistently highlighted that there are genuine and deep-seated concerns from our members across a very wide range of issues particularly on the areas of bureaucracy, additional restrictions, governance, access, liability, and the impact on the social structure of these areas. These very real issues clearly remain."

Attwood lost his seat at the 2017 Assembly election.

In March 2021, he was appointed as a member of the UK Electoral Commission. In December 2022, he was named as one of the inaugural members of the Irish Electoral Commission, that was established on 9 February 2023.

Northern Ireland Assembly
New assembly	MLA for Belfast West; 1998–2017	Seat abolished
Party political offices
Preceded by Jim Lennon	Chairperson of the Social Democratic and Labour Party; 2000–2004	Succeeded by Patricia Lewsley
Political offices
Preceded by Margaret Ritchie	Minister for Social Development; 2010–2011	Succeeded by Nelson McCausland
Preceded by Edwin Poots	Minister of the Environment; 2011–2013	Succeeded by Mark H. Durkan
