= Pat Sheehan (Irish republican) =

Irish Sinn Féin politician (born 1958)

Pat Sheehan MLA
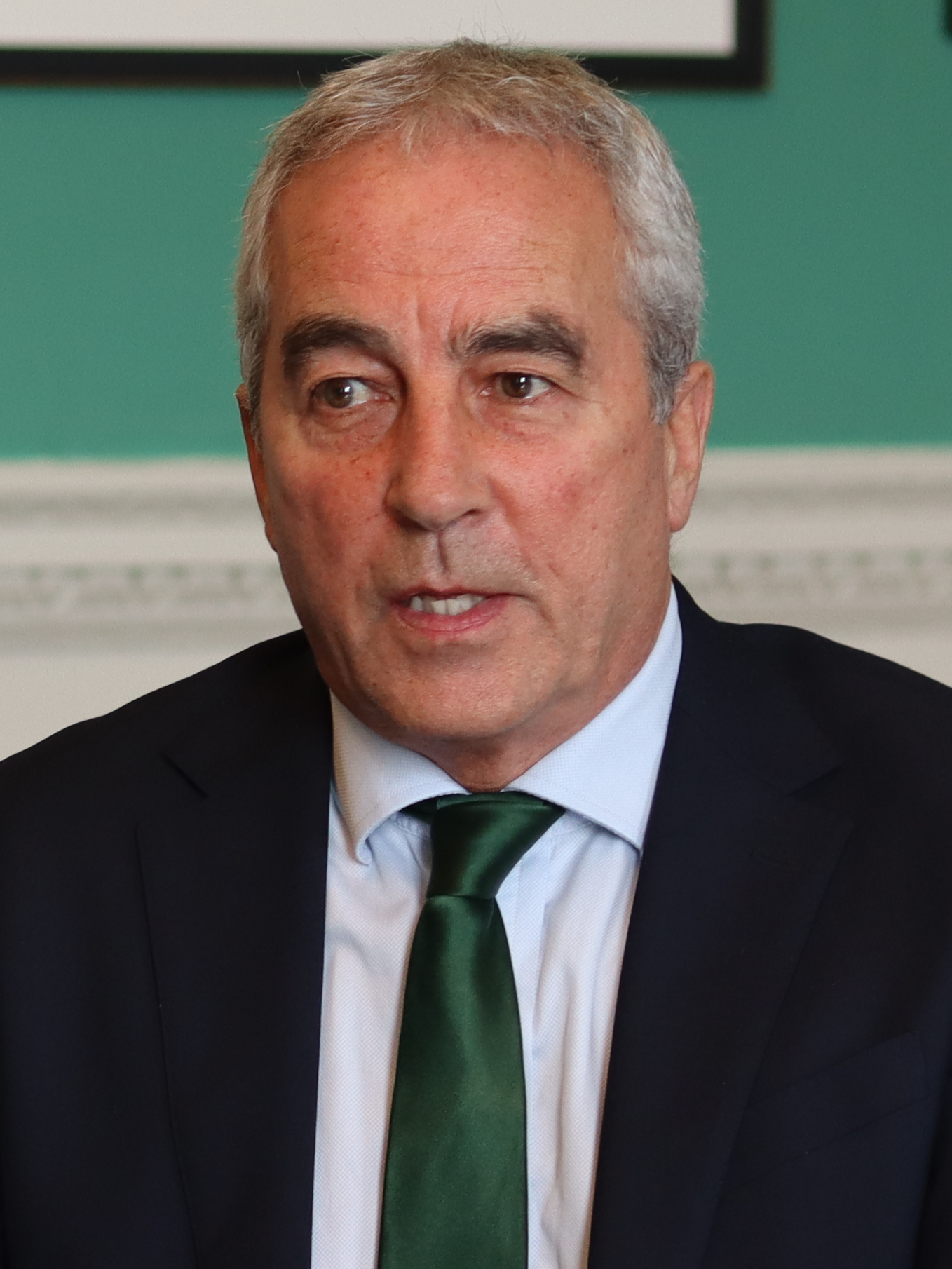
- Sheehan in 2023

Member of the Legislative Assembly for Belfast West
- Incumbent
- Assumed office 7 December 2010
- Preceded by: Gerry Adams

Personal details
- Born: 28 May 1958 (age 68) Belfast, Northern Ireland
- Party: Sinn Féin
- Spouse: Siobhán O'Hanlon (2006; her death)
- Other organizations: Provisional Irish Republican Army volunteer (formerly)

Pat Sheehan (born 28 May 1958) is an Irish Sinn Féin politician, and former Provisional Irish Republican Army member and hunger striker at the Maze Prison.

== Provisional IRA Activity ==
Sheehan was born in Belfast, Northern Ireland. He attended St Malachy's College and gained several O-levels before dropping out of full-time education. In his youth he was a member of Fianna, the IRA youth wing.

In 1978—aged 19—Sheehan took part in the bombing of cash-and-carry. He was sentenced to 15 years.

Sheehan was the 17th republican inmate at the Maze Prison to join the 1981 hunger strikes, which was aimed at gaining political status for Provisional IRA and Irish National Liberation Army prisoners. Sheehan began fasting on 10 August – after nine prisoners had already died – and ended when the hunger strike was officially called off on 3 October. He survived 55 days without food.

Sheehan was released in 1987. In 1989, he was convicted and sentenced to 24 years for attempting to booby trap a Belfast security checkpoint with a bomb. Sheehan spent his first two years at Crumlin Road Gaol, before being moved to H-Block, sharing a cell with Danny Morrison. He was released under the terms of the 1998 Belfast Agreement.

He picked up his education again on his release and in 1992 began to study Social Sciences and Philosophy with The Open University. He graduated with a first class honours degree in 1998.

== Political career ==
On 7 December 2010, he succeeded Gerry Adams as MLA for Belfast West, Adams having resigned to contest the 2011 Irish general election. Sheehan retained the seat for Sinn Féin at the 2011 Assembly election.

Sheehan has provoked anger and controversy by describing the Troubles as "probably quite civilised" and saying the IRA "could have left a 1,000lb car bomb on the Shankill" if it wanted to kill Protestants.

As of August 2015, he has been a Political Member of the Northern Ireland Policing Board.

== Personal life ==
Pat Sheehan is the widower of Sinn Féin activist Siobhán O'Hanlon who died from cancer in 2006. He has a son. Pat is also a keen cricket fan.

Northern Ireland Assembly
| Preceded by Gerry Adams | MLA for Belfast West; 2010–present | Incumbent |
