= Cara Hunter =

Northern Ireland politician (born 1995)

Cara Hunter MLA
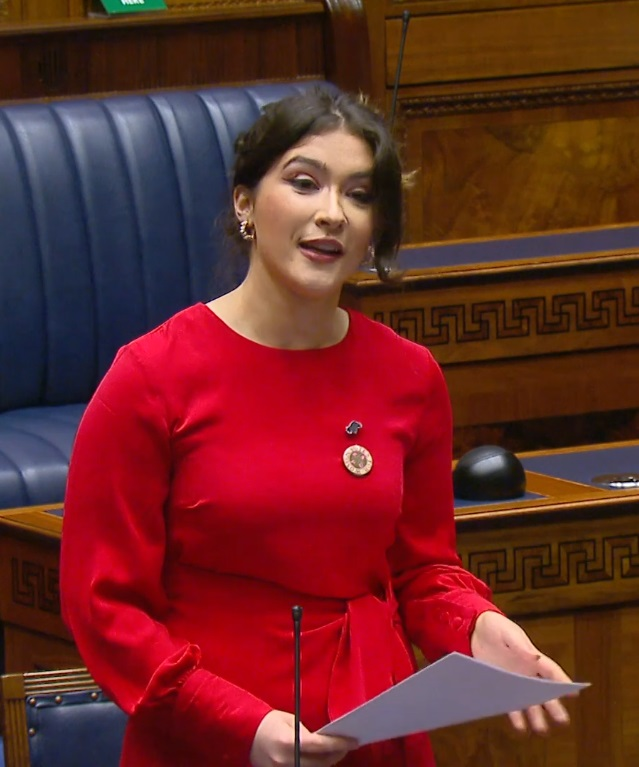
- Hunter in 2021

Member of the Legislative Assembly for East Londonderry
- Incumbent
- Assumed office 18 May 2020
- Preceded by: John Dallat

Member of Derry City and Strabane District Council
- In office 2 May 2019 – 18 May 2020
- Preceded by: Maolíosa McHugh
- Succeeded by: Steven Edwards
- Constituency: Derg

Personal details
- Born: 8 November 1995 (age 30) Northern Ireland
- Party: Social Democratic and Labour Party
- Education: California State University, Northridge; Liverpool John Moores University
- Occupation: Communications/PR
- Website: https://www.sdlp.ie/cara_hunter

Cara Hunter MLA (born 8 November 1995) is an Irish Social Democratic and Labour Party (SDLP) politician, currently serving as a Member of the Northern Ireland Assembly (MLA) for East Londonderry, a position she has held since 18 May 2020. She is the youngest ever elected female politician in the Northern Ireland Assembly.

== Early life ==
Hunter grew up in the Causeway Coast and Tyrone area and then moved to the United States at nine years old, attending Simi Valley High School in California and studying broadcast journalism at California State University, Northridge. She completed her degree at Liverpool John Moores University.

Hunter was crowned Miss Intercontinental 2017, becoming the first contestant from Northern Ireland to win the beauty pageant, after entering it to honour a close friend who died by suicide at the age of 20. As pageant titleholder, she served as an ambassador for Me4Mental, a mental health charity in Derry.

== Career ==
Hunter was elected to Derry City and Strabane District Council on 2 May 2019 and was elected as the youngest female ever to be Deputy Mayor of Derry City and Strabane.

Hunter stood in East Londonderry at the December 2019 general election, finishing second with 6,158 votes (15.7%) to Gregory Campbell of the Democratic Unionist Party.

=== Member of the Northern Ireland Assembly ===
She was co-opted to the Northern Ireland Assembly after the death of John Dallat in May 2020. She is the SDLP's mental health spokesperson.

Hunter was the target of a harassment campaign during the 2022 Northern Ireland Assembly election, in which a pornographic clip, falsely claimed as featuring Hunter, was circulated on social media. Hunter received abusive and sexually explicit messages from men as a result. She described them as an "intimidation tactic" to make her feel embarrassed and humiliated. In 2025, Irish News reported that Hunter was paid £300 per hour in an advisory role by an artificial intelligence firm. A spokesperson for the SDLP confirmed that Hunter declared her interests in line with Assembly guidelines and her work with the company was motivated by her own personal experiences.

She is also founder of the Addiction and Dual Diagnosis All-Party Group in the Northern Ireland Assembly which launched in 2020.

She stood again in East Londonderry at the 2024 general election, though was pushed into third place by Sinn Féin's Kathleen McGurk. Hunter polled 5,260 votes (12.7%), a decrease of 3.7%.

== Personal life ==
In October 2021, Hunter revealed that she had been diagnosed with a brain tumour on her first day at Stormont, saying that her condition was not "life-threatening" but "life-altering".

In September 2025, Hunter married. In January 2026, Hunter quit the social media site X (formerly Twitter) over concerns about deepfake pornographic content generated by its Grok artificial intelligence tool, which she described as a "complete negligence in protecting women and children online."

Civic offices
| Preceded by John Dallat | MLA for East Londonderry; 18 May 2020–present | Incumbent |
