= 5th Northern Ireland Assembly =

Northern Ireland MLAs 2016 to 2017

←	4th Assembly	6th Assembly	→

Overview
- Legislative body: Assembly
- Jurisdiction: Northern Ireland
- Meeting place: Parliament Buildings, Stormont
- Term: 5 May 2016 – 25 January 2017
- Election: 2016 assembly election
- Government: Executive of the 5th Assembly
- Members: 108
- Speaker: Robin Newton
- First Minister: Arlene Foster
- Deputy First Minister: Martin McGuinness

Sessions
- 1st: 12 May 2016 – 24 January 2017

This is a list of the members of the fifth Northern Ireland Assembly, the unicameral devolved legislature of Northern Ireland. Members of the Legislative Assembly (MLAs) elected on 5 May 2016 or subsequently co-opted are listed by party and by constituency.

Only the Democratic Unionist Party, Sinn Féin and an Independent Unionist participated in the 4th Northern Ireland Executive, which now comprised nine rather than 12 departments. The Ulster Unionist Party, Social Democratic and Labour Party and Alliance Party declined the roles they were entitled to, and under the Assembly and Executive Reform (Assembly Opposition) Act (Northern Ireland) 2016 the larger UUP and SDLP formed the first official Assembly Opposition.

The Assembly convened on 12 May, electing the DUP's Robin Newton as Speaker.

== Party strengths ==
Party		Designation	May 2016 election	Jan 2017 end
●	Democratic Unionist Party	Unionist	38	36
●	Sinn Féin	Nationalist	28	28
♦	Ulster Unionist Party	Unionist	16	16
♦	Social Democratic and Labour Party	Nationalist	12	12
♢	Alliance Party of Northern Ireland	Other	8	8
♢	Green Party in Northern Ireland	Other	2	2
♢	People Before Profit Alliance	Other	2	2
♢	Traditional Unionist Voice	Unionist	1	1
●	Independent	Unionist	1	1
♢	Independent (Note: Jonathan Bell was suspended from the DUP on 18 Dec 2016.)	Unionist	0	1
	Speaker (Note: Once elected, the Speaker relinquishes party affiliation.)	None	0	1
Total			108	
Roles at commencement: ● = Northern Ireland Executive (66); ♦ = Assembly Opposition (28); ♢ = Other opposition (13).

=== Graphical representation ===
At election, 5 May 2016

12 May to 18 Dec 2016

18 Dec 2016 to end

This is not the official seating plan

== MLAs by party ==
Party	Name	Constituency
Democratic Unionist Party (36)	Sydney Anderson	Upper Bann
Democratic Unionist Party (36)	Maurice Bradley	East Londonderry
Democratic Unionist Party (36)	Paula Bradley	Belfast North
Democratic Unionist Party (36)	Keith Buchanan	Mid Ulster
Democratic Unionist Party (36)	Thomas Buchanan	West Tyrone
Democratic Unionist Party (36)	Joanne Bunting	Belfast East
Democratic Unionist Party (36)	Pam Cameron	South Antrim
Democratic Unionist Party (36)	Trevor Clarke	South Antrim
Democratic Unionist Party (36)	Sammy Douglas	Belfast East
Democratic Unionist Party (36)	Gordon Dunne	North Down
Democratic Unionist Party (36)	Alex Easton	North Down
Democratic Unionist Party (36)	Arlene Foster	Fermanagh and South Tyrone
Democratic Unionist Party (36)	Paul Frew	North Antrim
Democratic Unionist Party (36)	Paul Girvan	South Antrim
Democratic Unionist Party (36)	Paul Givan	Lagan Valley
Democratic Unionist Party (36)	Brenda Hale	Lagan Valley
Democratic Unionist Party (36)	Simon Hamilton	Strangford
Democratic Unionist Party (36)	David Hilditch	East Antrim
Democratic Unionist Party (36)	William Humphrey	Belfast North
Democratic Unionist Party (36)	William Irwin	Newry and Armagh
Democratic Unionist Party (36)	Carla Lockhart	Upper Bann
Democratic Unionist Party (36)	Phillip Logan	North Antrim
Democratic Unionist Party (36)	Gordon Lyons	East Antrim
Democratic Unionist Party (36)	Nelson McCausland	Belfast North
Democratic Unionist Party (36)	Michelle McIlveen	Strangford
Democratic Unionist Party (36)	Adrian McQuillan	East Londonderry
Democratic Unionist Party (36)	Gary Middleton	Foyle
Democratic Unionist Party (36)	Maurice Morrow	Fermanagh and South Tyrone
Democratic Unionist Party (36)	Emma Pengelly	Belfast South
Democratic Unionist Party (36)	Edwin Poots	Lagan Valley
Democratic Unionist Party (36)	George Robinson	East Londonderry
Democratic Unionist Party (36)	Alastair Ross	East Antrim
Democratic Unionist Party (36)	Christopher Stalford	Belfast South
Democratic Unionist Party (36)	Mervyn Storey	North Antrim
Democratic Unionist Party (36)	Peter Weir	North Down
Democratic Unionist Party (36)	Jim Wells	South Down
Sinn Féin (28)	Caoimhe Archibald	East Londonderry
Sinn Féin (28)	Cathal Boylan	Newry and Armagh
Sinn Féin (28)	Michaela Boyle	West Tyrone
Sinn Féin (28)	Linda Dillon	Mid Ulster
Sinn Féin (28)	Megan Fearon	Newry and Armagh
Sinn Féin (28)	Órlaithí Flynn †	Belfast West
Sinn Féin (28)	Michelle Gildernew	Fermanagh and South Tyrone
Sinn Féin (28)	Chris Hazzard	South Down
Sinn Féin (28)	Declan Kearney	South Antrim
Sinn Féin (28)	Gerry Kelly	Belfast North
Sinn Féin (28)	Seán Lynch	Fermanagh and South Tyrone
Sinn Féin (28)	Declan McAleer	West Tyrone
Sinn Féin (28)	Fra McCann	Belfast West
Sinn Féin (28)	Raymond McCartney	Foyle
Sinn Féin (28)	Barry McElduff	West Tyrone
Sinn Féin (28)	Philip McGuigan †	North Antrim
Sinn Féin (28)	Martin McGuinness	Foyle
Sinn Féin (28)	Oliver McMullan	East Antrim
Sinn Féin (28)	Alex Maskey	Belfast West
Sinn Féin (28)	Ian Milne	Mid Ulster
Sinn Féin (28)	Conor Murphy	Newry and Armagh
Sinn Féin (28)	Carál Ní Chuilín	Belfast North
Sinn Féin (28)	Máirtín Ó Muilleoir	Belfast South
Sinn Féin (28)	John O'Dowd	Upper Bann
Sinn Féin (28)	Michelle O'Neill	Mid Ulster
Sinn Féin (28)	Caitríona Ruane	South Down
Sinn Féin (28)	Catherine Seeley	Upper Bann
Sinn Féin (28)	Pat Sheehan	Belfast West
Ulster Unionist Party (16)	Steve Aiken	South Antrim
Ulster Unionist Party (16)	Andy Allen	Belfast East
Ulster Unionist Party (16)	Rosemary Barton	Fermanagh and South Tyrone
Ulster Unionist Party (16)	Doug Beattie	Upper Bann
Ulster Unionist Party (16)	Roy Beggs, Jr.	East Antrim
Ulster Unionist Party (16)	Robbie Butler	Lagan Valley
Ulster Unionist Party (16)	Alan Chambers	North Down
Ulster Unionist Party (16)	Jo-Anne Dobson	Upper Bann
Ulster Unionist Party (16)	Ross Hussey	West Tyrone
Ulster Unionist Party (16)	Danny Kennedy	Newry and Armagh
Ulster Unionist Party (16)	Harold McKee	South Down
Ulster Unionist Party (16)	Mike Nesbitt	Strangford
Ulster Unionist Party (16)	Sandra Overend	Mid Ulster
Ulster Unionist Party (16)	Jennifer Palmer	Lagan Valley
Ulster Unionist Party (16)	Philip Smith	Strangford
Ulster Unionist Party (16)	Robin Swann	North Antrim
Social Democratic and Labour Party (12)	Alex Attwood	Belfast West
Social Democratic and Labour Party (12)	Sinéad Bradley	South Down
Social Democratic and Labour Party (12)	Mark H. Durkan	Foyle
Social Democratic and Labour Party (12)	Colum Eastwood	Foyle
Social Democratic and Labour Party (12)	Claire Hanna	Belfast South
Social Democratic and Labour Party (12)	Daniel McCrossan	West Tyrone
Social Democratic and Labour Party (12)	Patsy McGlone	Mid Ulster
Social Democratic and Labour Party (12)	Colin McGrath	South Down
Social Democratic and Labour Party (12)	Justin McNulty	Newry and Armagh
Social Democratic and Labour Party (12)	Richie McPhillips	Fermanagh and South Tyrone
Social Democratic and Labour Party (12)	Nichola Mallon	Belfast North
Social Democratic and Labour Party (12)	Gerry Mullan	East Londonderry
Alliance Party of Northern Ireland (8)	Kellie Armstrong	Strangford
Alliance Party of Northern Ireland (8)	Paula Bradshaw	Belfast South
Alliance Party of Northern Ireland (8)	Stewart Dickson	East Antrim
Alliance Party of Northern Ireland (8)	Stephen Farry	North Down
Alliance Party of Northern Ireland (8)	David Ford	South Antrim
Alliance Party of Northern Ireland (8)	Naomi Long	Belfast East
Alliance Party of Northern Ireland (8)	Trevor Lunn	Lagan Valley
Alliance Party of Northern Ireland (8)	Chris Lyttle	Belfast East
Green Party in Northern Ireland (2)	Steven Agnew	North Down
Green Party in Northern Ireland (2)	Clare Bailey	Belfast South
People Before Profit Alliance (2)	Gerry Carroll	Belfast West
People Before Profit Alliance (2)	Eamonn McCann	Foyle
Traditional Unionist Voice (1)	Jim Allister	North Antrim
Independent Unionist (2)	Jonathan Bell ‡	Strangford
Independent Unionist (2)	Claire Sugden	East Londonderry
Speaker (1)	Robin Newton ‡	Belfast East

† Co-opted to replace an elected MLA

‡ Changed affiliation during the term

== MLAs by constituency ==
Constituency	Name	Party
Belfast East	Andy Allen	Ulster Unionist Party
Belfast East	Joanne Bunting	Democratic Unionist Party
Belfast East	Sammy Douglas	Democratic Unionist Party
Belfast East	Naomi Long	Alliance Party of Northern Ireland
Belfast East	Chris Lyttle	Alliance Party of Northern Ireland
Belfast East	Robin Newton	Speaker
Belfast North	Paula Bradley	Democratic Unionist Party
Belfast North	William Humphrey	Democratic Unionist Party
Belfast North	Gerry Kelly	Sinn Féin
Belfast North	Nichola Mallon	Social Democratic and Labour Party
Belfast North	Nelson McCausland	Democratic Unionist Party
Belfast North	Carál Ní Chuilín	Sinn Féin
Belfast South	Clare Bailey	Green Party in Northern Ireland
Belfast South	Paula Bradshaw	Alliance Party of Northern Ireland
Belfast South	Claire Hanna	Social Democratic and Labour Party
Belfast South	Máirtín Ó Muilleoir	Sinn Féin
Belfast South	Emma Pengelly	Democratic Unionist Party
Belfast South	Christopher Stalford	Democratic Unionist Party
Belfast West	Alex Attwood	Social Democratic and Labour Party
Belfast West	Gerry Carroll	People Before Profit Alliance
Belfast West	Órlaithí Flynn †	Sinn Féin
Belfast West	Alex Maskey	Sinn Féin
Belfast West	Fra McCann	Sinn Féin
Belfast West	Pat Sheehan	Sinn Féin
East Antrim	Roy Beggs, Jr.	Ulster Unionist Party
East Antrim	Stewart Dickson	Alliance Party of Northern Ireland
East Antrim	David Hilditch	Democratic Unionist Party
East Antrim	Gordon Lyons	Democratic Unionist Party
East Antrim	Oliver McMullan	Sinn Féin
East Antrim	Alastair Ross	Democratic Unionist Party
East Londonderry	Caoimhe Archibald	Sinn Féin
East Londonderry	Maurice Bradley	Democratic Unionist Party
East Londonderry	Adrian McQuillan	Democratic Unionist Party
East Londonderry	Gerry Mullan	Social Democratic and Labour Party
East Londonderry	George Robinson	Democratic Unionist Party
East Londonderry	Claire Sugden	Independent Unionist
Fermanagh and South Tyrone	Rosemary Barton	Ulster Unionist Party
Fermanagh and South Tyrone	Arlene Foster	Democratic Unionist Party
Fermanagh and South Tyrone	Michelle Gildernew	Sinn Féin
Fermanagh and South Tyrone	Seán Lynch	Sinn Féin
Fermanagh and South Tyrone	Richie McPhillips	Social Democratic and Labour Party
Fermanagh and South Tyrone	Maurice Morrow	Democratic Unionist Party
Foyle	Colum Eastwood	Social Democratic and Labour Party
Foyle	Mark H. Durkan	Social Democratic and Labour Party
Foyle	Eamonn McCann	People Before Profit Alliance
Foyle	Raymond McCartney	Sinn Féin
Foyle	Martin McGuinness	Sinn Féin
Foyle	Gary Middleton	Democratic Unionist Party
Lagan Valley	Robbie Butler	Ulster Unionist Party
Lagan Valley	Paul Givan	Democratic Unionist Party
Lagan Valley	Brenda Hale	Democratic Unionist Party
Lagan Valley	Trevor Lunn	Alliance Party of Northern Ireland
Lagan Valley	Jennifer Palmer	Ulster Unionist Party
Lagan Valley	Edwin Poots	Democratic Unionist Party
Mid Ulster	Keith Buchanan	Democratic Unionist Party
Mid Ulster	Linda Dillon	Sinn Féin
Mid Ulster	Patsy McGlone	Social Democratic and Labour Party
Mid Ulster	Ian Milne	Sinn Féin
Mid Ulster	Michelle O'Neill	Sinn Féin
Mid Ulster	Sandra Overend	Ulster Unionist Party
Newry and Armagh	Cathal Boylan	Sinn Féin
Newry and Armagh	Megan Fearon	Sinn Féin
Newry and Armagh	William Irwin	Democratic Unionist Party
Newry and Armagh	Danny Kennedy	Ulster Unionist Party
Newry and Armagh	Justin McNulty	Social Democratic and Labour Party
Newry and Armagh	Conor Murphy	Sinn Féin
North Antrim	Jim Allister	Traditional Unionist Voice
North Antrim	Paul Frew	Democratic Unionist Party
North Antrim	Phillip Logan	Democratic Unionist Party
North Antrim	Philip McGuigan †	Sinn Féin
North Antrim	Mervyn Storey	Democratic Unionist Party
North Antrim	Robin Swann	Ulster Unionist Party
North Down	Steven Agnew	Green Party in Northern Ireland
North Down	Alan Chambers	Ulster Unionist Party
North Down	Gordon Dunne	Democratic Unionist Party
North Down	Alex Easton	Democratic Unionist Party
North Down	Stephen Farry	Alliance Party of Northern Ireland
North Down	Peter Weir	Democratic Unionist Party
South Antrim	Steve Aiken	Ulster Unionist Party
South Antrim	Pam Cameron	Democratic Unionist Party
South Antrim	Trevor Clarke	Democratic Unionist Party
South Antrim	David Ford	Alliance Party of Northern Ireland
South Antrim	Paul Girvan	Democratic Unionist Party
South Antrim	Declan Kearney	Sinn Féin
South Down	Sinéad Bradley	Social Democratic and Labour Party
South Down	Chris Hazzard	Sinn Féin
South Down	Colin McGrath	Social Democratic and Labour Party
South Down	Harold McKee	Ulster Unionist Party
South Down	Caitríona Ruane	Sinn Féin
South Down	Jim Wells	Democratic Unionist Party
Strangford	Kellie Armstrong	Alliance Party of Northern Ireland
Strangford	Jonathan Bell ‡	Independent Unionist
Strangford	Simon Hamilton	Democratic Unionist Party
Strangford	Michelle McIlveen	Democratic Unionist Party
Strangford	Mike Nesbitt	Ulster Unionist Party
Strangford	Philip Smith	Ulster Unionist Party
Upper Bann	Sydney Anderson	Democratic Unionist Party
Upper Bann	Doug Beattie	Ulster Unionist Party
Upper Bann	Jo-Anne Dobson	Ulster Unionist Party
Upper Bann	Carla Lockhart	Democratic Unionist Party
Upper Bann	John O'Dowd	Sinn Féin
Upper Bann	Catherine Seeley	Sinn Féin
West Tyrone	Thomas Buchanan	Democratic Unionist Party
West Tyrone	Michaela Boyle	Sinn Féin
West Tyrone	Ross Hussey	Ulster Unionist Party
West Tyrone	Declan McAleer	Sinn Féin
West Tyrone	Daniel McCrossan	Social Democratic and Labour Party
West Tyrone	Barry McElduff	Sinn Féin

† Co-opted to replace an elected MLA ‡ Changed affiliation during the term

== Changes since the election ==
=== † Co-options ===
Date co-opted	Constituency	Party	Outgoing	Co-optee	Reason
18 August 2016	North Antrim	Sinn Féin	Daithí McKay	Philip McGuigan	Daithí McKay resigned.
7 December 2016	Belfast West	Sinn Féin	Jennifer McCann	Órlaithí Flynn	Jennifer McCann resigned.

=== ‡ Changes in affiliation ===
Date	Constituency	Name	Previous affiliation	New affiliation	Circumstance
12 May 2016	Belfast East	Robin Newton	DUP	Speaker	Robin Newton elected Speaker of the Assembly at its first sitting.
18 December 2016	Strangford	Jonathan Bell	DUP	Ind. Unionist	Jonathan Bell suspended from the DUP.
