= Republican Belfast =

Tourist book by Rab Kerr

Republican Belfast: A Political Tourist's Guide
- First edition cover
- Author: Rab Kerr
- Language: English
- Genre: Irish Republicanism Guidebook
- Publisher: MSF Press
- Publication date: 2008
- Publication place: Ireland
- Media type: Print (Paperback)
- Pages: 148

Republican Belfast: A Political Tourist's Guide, written by an Irish republican ex prisoner Rab Kerr, is acknowledged as being the first republican tourist book written about Belfast. The book contains maps, photographs and commentary on a number of sites of political and cultural interest in 'Republican Belfast'. It documents the locations of all republican murals in the Greater Belfast area, as well as memorial gardens, museums and other such sites of interest. The book goes beyond listing the murals, plaques and memorials which can be found in the city and which are seen increasingly as one of Belfasts key tourist attractions.

Murals in the book focus on such events as the Hunger strikes of 1981, collusion, "women in struggle", deceased IRA Volunteers, the Israel-Palestine Conflict, the Basque Freedom Struggle, racism, sectarianism and the 1916 Easter Rising. Sections of the book are devoted to places such as Milltown Cemetery and Clifton Street Cemetery where many IRA Volunteers and members of the United Irishmen are buried. A section of the book dealing with Milltown Cemetery, Andersonstown Barracks, The Felons Club and some murals can be downloaded from the University of Ulster's CAIN website.

Kerr is married to Sinn Féin politician Jennifer McCann.
