= Rab Kerr =

Irish republican and writer

Robert Kerr

Personal details
- Born: Robert Kerr Belfast, Northern Ireland
- Died: 14 May 2023
- Website: http://www.belfastmuralguide.com/

Robert 'Rab' Kerr was an Irish republican ex-prisoner who spent 18 years in British prisons, during which he spent three years on the 'Blanket Protest' in the H-Blocks and took part in the 'Great Escape' from Long Kesh in 1983. Since his release from prison he has co-authored four books of photographs documenting the history of Belfast during the last century, as well as producing a number of booklets and magazines. In 2008 he wrote what has been described as the first republican tourist guide to Belfast: Republican Belfast: A Political Tourist's Guide.

In 1990 Kerr, then a prisoner at HM Prison Maze married fellow IRA prisoner Jennifer McCann at HM Prison Maze. Fellow prisoners Laurence McKeown and Mary McArdle were the best man and bridesmaid. Kerr died on 14 May 2023, being survived by McCann and their three children.

== Bibliography ==
- New Lodge: 100 years in pictures; Authors: Joe Baker & Robert Kerr. Publisher: Glenravel Local History Project, 2000
- Snapshots of Belfast 1920–1929; Authors: Joe Baker & Robert Kerr. Publisher: Glenravel Local History Project, [2001]
- Snapshots of Belfast 1930–1939; Authors: Joe Baker & Robert Kerr. Publisher: Glenravel Local History Project, [2001]
- Snapshots of Belfast 1940–1949; Authors: Joe Baker & Robert Kerr. Publisher: Glenravel Local History Project, [2002]
- Republican Belfast: A political tourist's guide; Author: Robert Kerr, Publisher: MSF Press, [2008], ISBN 978-0-9560264-0-8
- Three Gaols: Images of Crumlin Road, Long Kesh and Armagh Prisons; Author: Robert Kerr. Publisher: MSF Press, [2011], ISBN 978-0-9568069-0-1
- The Belfast Mural Guide; Locate Series; Author: Robert Kerr, Publisher: MSF Press, [2014], ISBN 978-0-9568069-1-8
- An Treoir do Mhúrphictiúir Bhéal Feirste; The Belfast Mural Guide (Publication Language:Irish); Author: Robert Kerr, Publisher: MSF Press, [2014], ISBN 978-0-9568069-2-5
