= Northern Ireland Assembly Opposition =

The role of official opposition in the Northern Ireland Assembly can be taken by larger political parties who do not participate in Northern Ireland's consociational power-sharing Executive. Forming an Assembly Opposition empowers opposition parties to scrutinise the work of government, giving them financial assistance, enhanced speaking rights in the chamber and the right to chair certain committees.

While the Assembly and Executive had been in operation since 1998 and 1999, respectively (following the Good Friday Agreement), the Assembly Opposition was only established in 2016, as part of the Fresh Start Agreement. The opportunity was first taken by the Ulster Unionist Party and Social Democratic and Labour Party for the Assembly's fifth term, following the May 2016 assembly election, and has once again been taken by the SDLP since the May 2022 assembly election.

== Opposition in previous legislatures ==
Northern Ireland was governed from 1921 to 1972 by a bicameral Parliament, where in the lower House of Commons the largest and therefore the governing party was consistently the Ulster Unionist Party. It could have been expected, following the Westminster system, that the role of official Opposition would be taken by largest party outside of government, which was consistently an Irish nationalist party (jointly Sinn Féin and the Nationalist Party in the Parliament's first term from 1921 to 1925, and thereafter the Nationalist Party). However, during this time members of the Nationalist opposition often practised a policy of abstentionism where they would run for seats in the parliament but refuse to take them if elected, in order not to give legitimacy to British rule or the partition of the island. Nationalist Party members refused to take their seats in the legislature until 1924, and resumed the abstentionist policy in the 1930s to protest the abolition of proportional representation. From 1937, Thomas Joseph Campbell and Richard Byrne were the only Nationalist MPs to take their seats until Byrne's death in 1942 and Campbell's resignation in 1945.

It was not until February 1965 that the Nationalist Party agreed to accept recognition as the Official Opposition in the House of Commons. Eddie McAteer served as Leader of the Opposition for the remainder of the tenth term and through the eleventh term until they withdrew from the official Opposition in October 1968 following the Government's response the RUC's attack on a NICRA march in Derry.

The majority-rule Parliament was abolished and replaced in 1973 by a unicameral Northern Ireland Assembly. An Executive was formed in which unionist, nationalist and cross-community parties shared power for the first time. However, that government only lasted from January to May 1974, and from then until the Good Friday Agreement in 1998 Northern Ireland was ruled directly by the British Government.

== Participation ==
The legal basis for the Assembly Opposition was established by the Assembly and Executive Reform (Assembly Opposition) Act (Northern Ireland) 2016. Under section 2, a party may join the official Opposition if it both has no minister in government, and it meets one or both of two criteria:

- It is entitled to one or more ministerial roles following the D'Hondt method (as described in the Northern Ireland Act 1998, section 18(2)–(6)) (but declines them);
- It holds 8% or more of the total number of seats in the Assembly. This amounted to nine out of 108 seats in the Assembly's fifth term (2016–2017), but eight out of 90 from the sixth term (2017–2022) when five rather than six MLAs were returned from each constituency.

The UUP have consistently fulfilled both criteria, however only elected to join the Opposition in the fifth term. The SDLP met both criteria after the 2016 and 2017 elections, and met the second criteria after the 2022 election, choosing to join the opposition for the fifth and seventh terms. Alliance fulfilled the second criteria in the 2017 election and both criteria after the 2022 election but have not elected to join the Opposition.

Meanwhile, the Democratic Unionist Party and Sinn Féin would currently be excluded from entering opposition if they wished to, because as the largest unionist and largest nationalist party they must participate in the Executive.

The Assembly Opposition Act recognises the offices of Leader of the Largest Non-Executive Party and Leader of the Second-Largest Non-Executive Party, although these positions may be given alternative names (section 5). Assembly Standing Orders clarifies these roles will be titled the Leader of the Opposition and the Deputy Leader of the Opposition.

== Benefits of official status ==
Following the Assembly Opposition Act, the standing orders which regulate how the Assembly conducts its business were amended on 14 March 2016 to provide the Assembly Opposition with:

- official recognition (Standing Order 45A);
- the right to ask the first Topical Question (Standing Order 20A, following section 6 of the Act);
- a period for Opposition Business (Standing Order 10).

The Assembly Opposition Act also required standing orders to grant:

- enhanced speaking rights "including a minimum of 10 days per year set aside for Opposition business" (section 8);
- the right to chair the Public Accounts Committee (section 9);
- membership of the Business Committee (section 10);

and amended the Financial Assistance for Political Parties Act (Northern Ireland) 2000 to give Assembly Opposition parties additional funding (section 11).

== See also ==
- Leader of the Opposition (Northern Ireland)
- Northern Ireland Assembly
- Northern Ireland Executive
- Opposition (parliamentary)
- Her Majesty's Most Loyal Opposition (United Kingdom)
