= Claire Sugden =

Northern Irish politician

Claire Sugden MLA
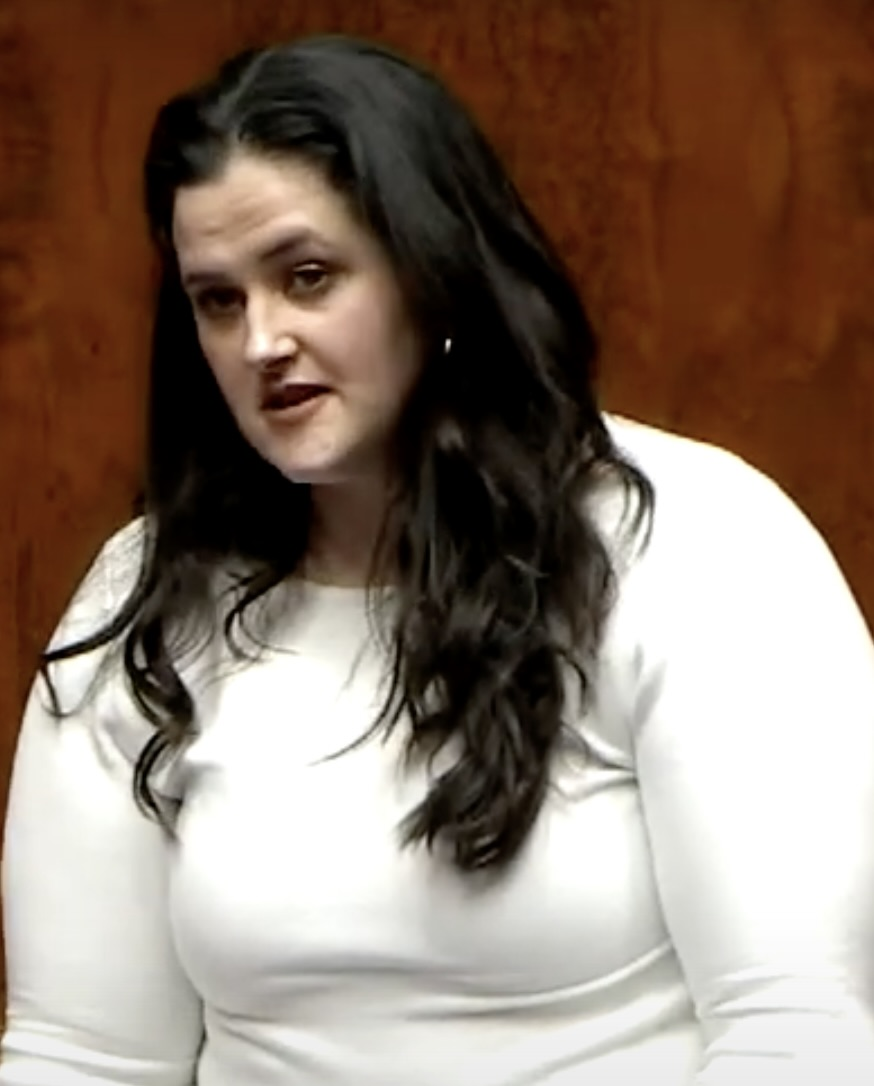

Minister of Justice
- In office 25 May 2016 – 2 March 2017
- First Minister: Arlene Foster
- Preceded by: David Ford
- Succeeded by: Naomi Long

Member of the Northern Ireland Assembly for East Londonderry
- Incumbent
- Assumed office 6 May 2014
- Preceded by: David McClarty

Member of Coleraine Borough Council
- In office 2013–2014
- Preceded by: David McClarty
- Succeeded by: Council abolished
- Constituency: Coleraine Central

Personal details
- Born: 7 August 1986 (age 40) Castlerock, Northern Ireland
- Party: Independent Unionist
- Spouse: Andy Anderson (m. 2019)
- Children: 1
- Education: Queen's University Belfast

Claire Sugden (born 7 August 1986) is a Northern Irish politician who was the Minister of Justice in the fourth Northern Ireland Executive from May 2016 to March 2017. She is a Member of the Legislative Assembly (MLA) for East Londonderry, having been co-opted to the position after the death of David McClarty in 2014, and won election to the seat in 2016, 2017 and 2022. She is an Independent Unionist, and is considered to be one of the most socially liberal unionist MLAs in the Assembly.

== Early life and education ==
Sugden was born the youngest of five children of Arthur and Elizabeth Sugden. Arthur was born in Leeds and worked as a prison officer, and met Elizabeth in Castlerock. Claire Sugden was raised in the Greenmount area of Coleraine. She attended Killowen primary school and Coleraine High School before studying a bachelor's degree in politics at Queen's University Belfast and graduating in 2008. She also has a master's degree in Irish politics from Queen's University Belfast and was studying part-time for a master's degree in political lobbying from the Ulster University when she was co-opted as an MLA.

== Political career ==
=== Early political career ===
After graduating in 2008, Sugden was an intern at the Office of the First Minister and Deputy First Minister. She then interned at the United States Department of Health and Human Services as part of the Washington-Ireland Program. In 2008, she began working as a parliamentary assistant for David McClarty, then Ulster Unionist Party MLA for East Londonderry, a role she maintained until her co-option in 2014. In 2011, she managed McClarty's campaign for East Londonderry after he resigned from the UUP and stood as an independent unionist. She was co-opted as a member of Coleraine Borough Council in 2013 after McClarty resigned his seat on the council, and succeeded him as a Legislative Assembly member in February 2014 after his death.

=== Co-opted MLA ===
After McClarty's death in April 2014, Sugden was co-opted as the MLA for East Londonderry, becoming one of the youngest MLAs in the Northern Ireland Assembly. In her maiden speech, on 16 October 2014, she told MLAs to "Be mindful of how far we have come, because that is important, and take responsibility for the power that you hold."

She served as a member of the Committee for Employment and Learning from 12 May 2014 to 30 March 2016 and as chairperson of the All Party Group on Ageing and Older People from 29 October 2015 to 30 March 2016. During her first two-year term, she was considered a member of the "naughty corner" in the Assembly for being "rarely quiet and not afraid to stand up to the two major parties". Sugden raised a matter of the day on the future of Northern Irish political institutions in September 2015. During her speech, she said: "This house of cards is falling, and good will come of that only if the jokers at the top come crashing down too and do not get up again." Speaking in the Assembly on the November 2015 Paris attacks, she said "it takes a special kind of bastard to inflict that pain on so many," for which she was warned by the Speaker for her use of language.

She was elected as the MLA for East Londonderry in the 2016 election. She paid tribute to McClarty upon her election, saying "It means so much to me that people have trusted me with their vote. David trusted me with his seat."

=== Minister of Justice ===
Following the 2016 election, the UUP, SDLP and Alliance Party all entered opposition rather than taking roles in the Northern Ireland Executive. Neither party left in the Executive, Sinn Féin and the DUP, could agree on who should take the "contentious" role of Minister of Justice, "for fear of being accused of bias towards one community in the administration of justice".

It was reported in May 2016 that Arlene Foster, the DUP First Minister, and Martin McGuinness, the Sinn Féin Deputy First Minister, had held talks with Sugden over the possibility of taking on the justice portfolio. On 25 May 2016, it was announced that Sugden would take on the role, saying that it was a "huge challenge" but that she was "up for it". Foster said that she would be a minister "for all the people" and McGuinness praised her as "impressive and progressive."

The Law Society of Northern Ireland and the Bar of Northern Ireland welcomed her appointment. On 19 December 2016, during the Renewable Heat Incentive scandal, which implicated the First Minister Arlene Foster, Sugden voted against a vote of no confidence in Foster, calling it "premature". She said: "You ask me to support a motion that excludes the First Minister on the basis of no confidence: my confidence or, indeed, lack of confidence in the First Minister will be based on substantiated information, not allegations manifested in the media." She said that she supported an independent investigation of the accusation, "judicially led if necessary", and that she had also instructed her permanent secretary to investigate claims that the Department of Justice under her predecessor was privy to the details of the RHI scheme.

On 6 January 2017, she reiterated her support for an independent investigation but denied claims that she had unilateral power to call a public inquiry into Foster's actions. She also said that she believed Foster should remain in office while any investigation took place. She said that she would not resign, but that "Martin and Arlene have both let me down. I have not been sold a pup. But, when I took up the job, I did ask them one thing - let me do my job. And increasingly, particularly over the last four weeks, it's been difficult to do my job." On 9 January, McGuinness resigned as Deputy First Minister, and Sinn Féin refused to nominate a replacement, leading to the collapse of the Executive Office and to the calling of new elections, for March 2017.

After a suggestion that she might quit politics, Sugden announced that she would stand for re-election in January 2017, saying that "I never envisaged that less than a year into my mandate, I would be defending my seat for East Londonderry." During the campaign, she said that she "would like to finish the job I started" and return to the Executive as justice minister. She formally remained in post as Minister of Justice until election day, despite the Executive Committee being unable to meet. During the election count for the 2017 election, Sugden was the first elected MLA for the constituency of East Londonderry to be declared.

=== Post-ministerial career ===
In May 2021 Sugden turned down an invitation from Doug Beattie to join the UUP, preferring to remain as an independent, but did not rule out a move to the party in the longer term. She was re-elected to the Assembly in 2022.

== Personal life ==
Sugden married Andy Anderson at the end of June 2019. Sugden announced the birth of her daughter in 2023.

Northern Ireland Assembly
Preceded by David McClarty	MLA for East Londonderry; 2014–present	Incumbent
Political offices
Preceded by David Ford	Minister of Justice; 2016–2017	Vacant Office suspended
