= Liz Kimmins =

Northern Ireland politician

Liz Kimmins MLA
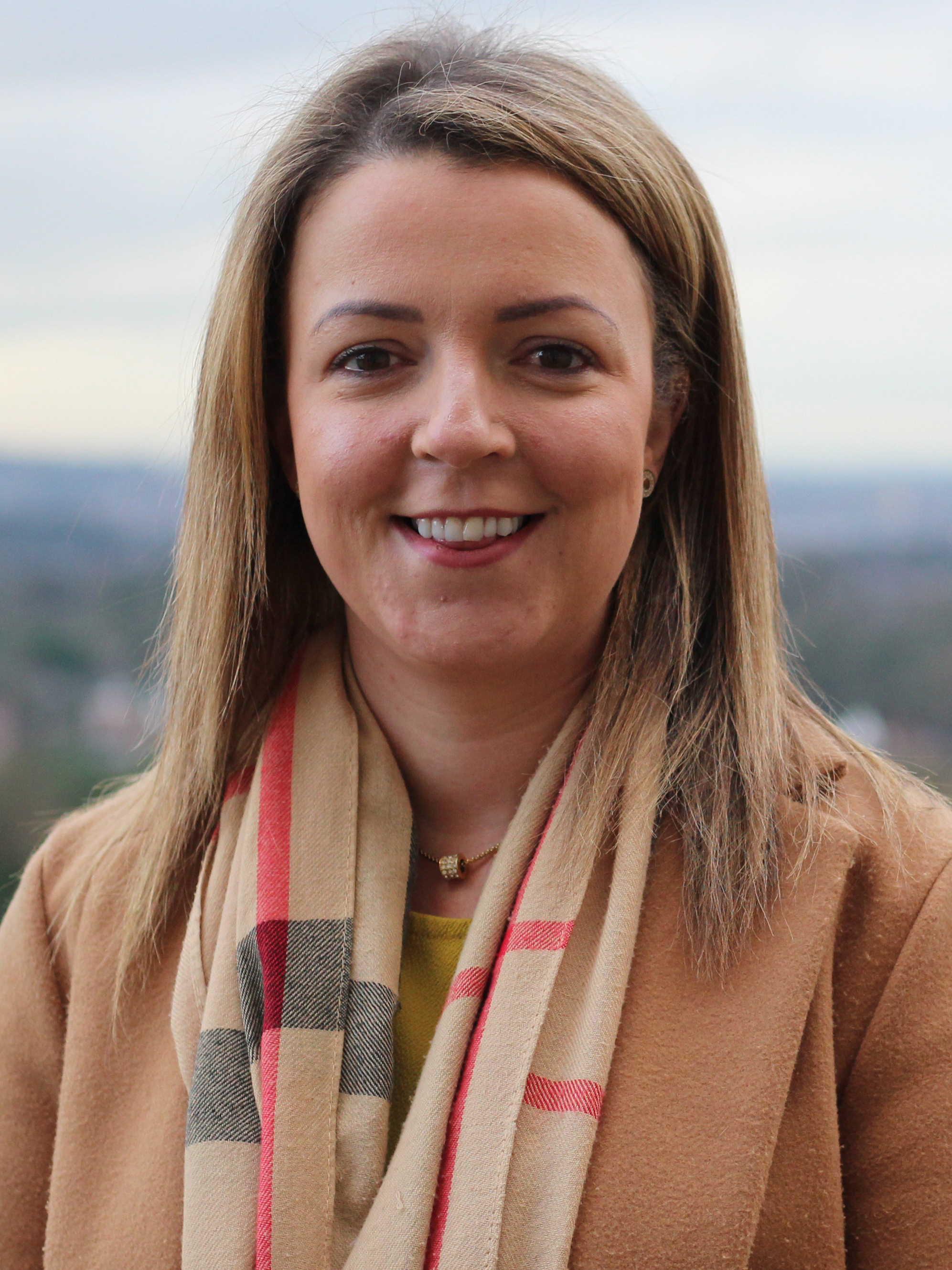
- Kimmins in 2019

Minister for Infrastructure
- Incumbent
- Assumed office 3 February 2025
- First Minister: Michelle O'Neill
- Preceded by: John O'Dowd

Member of the Legislative Assembly for Newry and Armagh
- Incumbent
- Assumed office 9 January 2020
- Preceded by: Megan Fearon

Personal details
- Party: Sinn Féin

Liz Kimmins MLA is a Sinn Féin politician, serving as Minister for Infrastructure since February 2025. She has also served as a Member of the Legislative Assembly for the Newry and Armagh constituency in the Northern Ireland Assembly since January 2020.

On 3 February 2025 it was announced that Kimmins would replace John O'Dowd as Minister for Infrastructure as part of a Sinn Féin reshuffle following Conor Murphy's election to Seanad Éireann.

== Education ==
Kimmins undertook undergraduate studies in Liverpool before postgraduate study at Queen's University, Belfast.

According to the Register of Members Interests at Newry, Mourne and Down District Council where Kimmins served briefly, she was a Registered Social Worker on the Northern Ireland Social Care Council before becoming a full-time politician.

Northern Ireland Assembly
Preceded by Megan Fearon	MLA for Newry and Armagh; 2020–present	Incumbent
