= Megan Fearon =

Irish Sinn Féin politician

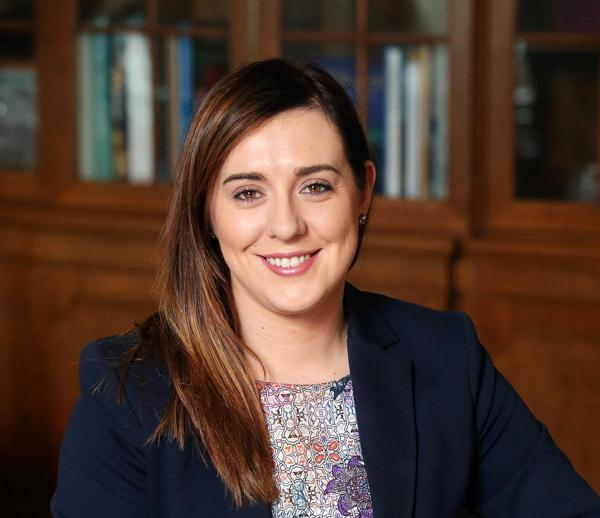
- Fearon in August 2016

Junior Minister Assisting the Deputy First Minister
- In office 25 May 2016 – 26 January 2017 Serving with Alastair Ross
- Deputy FM: Martin McGuinness
- Preceded by: Jennifer McCann
- Succeeded by: Declan Kearney

Member of the Legislative Assembly for Newry and Armagh
- In office 2 July 2012 – 6 January 2020
- Preceded by: Conor Murphy
- Succeeded by: Liz Kimmins

Personal details
- Born: 29 July 1991 (age 35) Drumintee, Northern Ireland
- Party: Sinn Féin
- Education: Queen's University Belfast

Megan Fearon (born 29 July 1991) is an Irish former Sinn Féin politician who was member of the Northern Ireland Assembly (MLA) for the Newry and Armagh constituency from June 2012 to January 2020. She remains the youngest MLA to have assumed office at the age of 20.

She was the party's spokesperson for equality and human rights and was a government minister in the Northern Ireland Executive at the age of 24, making her one of the youngest Government ministers in the world.

== Career ==
Fearon was selected by her party to succeed her party colleague Conor Murphy, an abstentionist MP in the parliament of the United Kingdom, who had resigned from the Assembly as part of Sinn Féin's policy of abolishing double jobbing.

At the time of her selection, Fearon had just completed her last year at Queen's University Belfast, where she took a degree in Politics, Philosophy and Economics. Before her selection, Fearon had campaigned for Sinn Féin and had worked to raise mental health and drug awareness. She replaced party colleague Chris Hazzard as the youngest MLA.

Fearon was a member of the departmental scrutiny committees for Finance, Economy, and the Office of the First and deputy First Minister.

She was an advocate for equality, particularly supporting causes like LGBTQIA+ equality, and abortion rights. Fearon served as Chairperson of the Northern Ireland Assembly Women's Caucus and was vice-chair of the APG on UNSCR 1325 Women, Peace and Security. Additionally, she served as a member of various other APGs, including those focused on Children and Young People, Domestic and Sexual Violence and Abuse, and Fair Trade.

Fearon was re-elected in the 2016 and 2017 Northern Ireland Assembly elections. In May 2016 it was announced that she was among four Sinn Féin MLAs who would be joining the next Northern Ireland Executive as ministers.

In December 2019, Fearon announced that she was stepping down as a Sinn Fein representative and that while she would remain an activist, her time in elected politics was over.

Northern Ireland Assembly
Preceded by Conor Murphy	MLA for Newry and Armagh; 2012–2020	Succeeded by Liz Kimmins
Political offices
Preceded by Jennifer McCann	Junior Minister; 2016–2017	Vacant Office suspended
