= Executive of the 5th Northern Ireland Assembly =

Northern Ireland Executive (2016–2017)

- 4th Executive of Northern Ireland
- May 2016 – January 2017
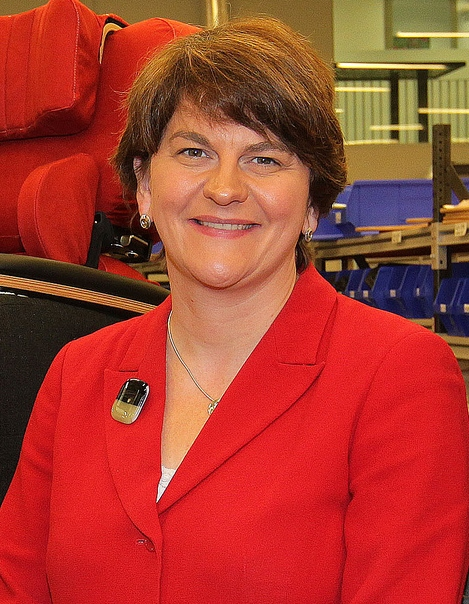
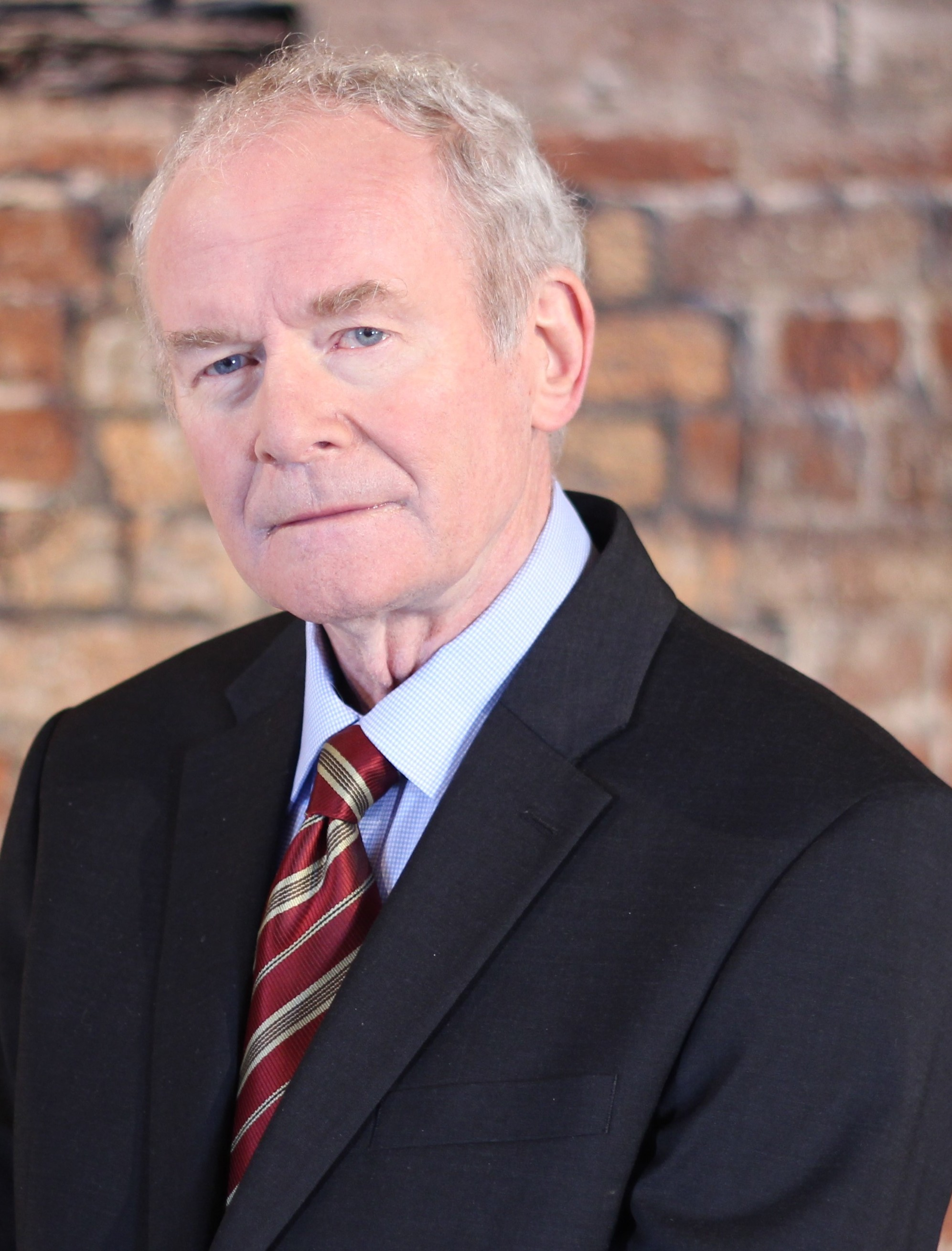
- Date formed: 26 May 2016
- Date dissolved: 16 January 2017

People and organisations
- Head of state: Elizabeth II
- Co-heads of government: Arlene Foster (First Minister); Martin McGuinness (deputy First Minister)
- No. of ministers: 10 (+ 2 junior ministers)
- Member party: DUP; Sinn Féin
- Status in legislature: Power–sharing coalition

History
- Election: 2016 assembly election
- Legislature term: 5th Assembly
- Predecessor: Executive of the 4th Assembly
- Successor: Executive of the 6th Assembly

The Fourth Executive was, under the terms of the Northern Ireland Act 1998, a power-sharing coalition.

Following the 6 May 2016 elections to the fifth Northern Ireland Assembly, the Democratic Unionist Party and Sinn Féin remained the two largest parties in the Assembly.

Notably for the first time in the assembly's history, parties entitled to seats on the executive could instead opt to go into formal opposition. The UUP, SDLP and Alliance all took up this option, leaving the DUP and Sinn Féin to form a government.

The 4th Northern Ireland Executive was formed on 25 May 2016. It lasted less than a year, and collapsed on 16 January 2017 following the resignation of deputy First Minister McGuinness in protest at the Renewable Heat Incentive scandal.

== 4th Executive of Northern Ireland ==
Office	Name	Term	Party
First Minister	Arlene Foster	2016–2017	DUP
Deputy First Minister	Martin McGuinness	2016–2017	Sinn Féin
Minister of Agriculture, Environment and Rural Affairs	Michelle McIlveen	2016–2017	DUP
Minister for Communities	Paul Givan	2016–2017	DUP
Minister of Education	Peter Weir	2016–2017	DUP
Minister for the Economy	Simon Hamilton	2016–2017	DUP
Minister of Finance	Máirtín Ó Muilleoir	2016–2017	Sinn Féin
Minister of Health	Michelle O'Neill	2016–2017	Sinn Féin
Minister for Infrastructure	Chris Hazzard	2016–2017	Sinn Féin
Minister of Justice	Claire Sugden	2016–2017	Independent Unionist

== See also ==
- List of Northern Ireland Executives
- Members of the Northern Ireland Assembly elected in 2016
