= Jennifer McCann =

Irish politician (born 1960)

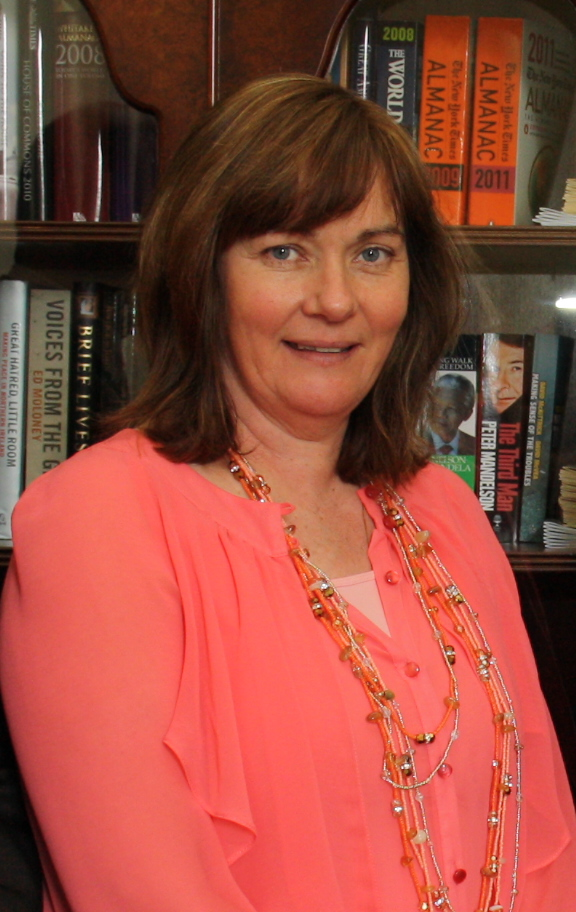

Junior Minister Assisting the Deputy First Minister
- In office 12 June 2012 – 25 June 2016 Serving with Jonathan Bell, Michelle McIlveen and Emma Pengelly^{[a]}
- Deputy FM: Martin McGuinness
- Preceded by: Martina Anderson
- Succeeded by: Megan Fearon

Member of the Legislative Assembly for Belfast West
- In office 7 March 2007 – 6 December 2016
- Preceded by: Diane Dodds
- Succeeded by: Órlaithí Flynn

Personal details
- Born: 1 March 1960 (age 66) Twinbrook, Northern Ireland
- Party: Sinn Féin
- Spouse: Rab Kerr
- Children: 3
- Website: Jennifer McCann MLA
- a. Served alongside Emma Pengelly until 25 May 2016

Jennifer McCann (born 1 March 1960) is an Irish republican former politician in Northern Ireland, who was elected in 2007 to the Northern Ireland Assembly as a Sinn Féin member for Belfast West. She resigned from the Assembly in December 2016.

== Early life ==
McCann was born in the Twinbrook area of Belfast, and was friends with Bobby Sands and his sister Bernadette. She joined the republican movement as a schoolgirl, becoming a member of Cumann na mBan then joining the Provisional Irish Republican Army aged 17. McCann was arrested aged 20, after shooting a Royal Ulster Constabulary police officer, and subsequently sentenced to 20 years' imprisonment.

== Political career ==
McCann was released from prison after serving just over ten years of her sentence, and began working for Sinn Féin in the POW Department and Women's Department. She is active on a number of projects in her community, including the Sally Gardens Community Centre Committee, the Safer Neighbourhoods Project, the Colin Community Festival, and the Falls Community Council's Community Drugs Programme.

== Personal life ==
In 1990 McCann, then a prisoner at HM Prison Maghaberry, married fellow IRA prisoner Rab Kerr at HM Prison Maze. Fellow prisoners Laurence McKeown and Mary McArdle were the best man and bridesmaid. Kerr died in May 2023, being survived by McCann and their three children.

== Sources ==
- "Bobby Sands was a great role model – he was never arrogant". Sunday Tribune. 12 November 2007. Archived from the original on 20 November 2007.
- Northern Ireland Assembly West Belfast MLAs Stratagem NI

Northern Ireland Assembly
Preceded by Diane Dodds	MLA for Belfast West; 2007–2016	Succeeded by Órlaithí Flynn
Political offices
Preceded by Martina Anderson	Junior Minister; 2012–2016	Succeeded by Megan Fearon
