= Northern Ireland Assembly =

Devolved legislature of Northern Ireland

Northern Ireland Assembly Tionól Thuaisceart Éireann Norlin Airlan Assemblie
- 7th Assembly
- Logo of the Northern Ireland Assembly

Type
- Type: Unicameral

History
- Founded: 25 June 1998 (current form)
- Preceded by: Parliament of Northern Ireland (1921–1972)

Leadership
- Speaker: Edwin Poots since 3 February 2024
- Deputy Speakers: Carál Ní Chuilín, Sinn Féin; since 6 February 2024; John Blair, Alliance; since 3 February 2024; Steve Aiken, UUP; since 3 February 2024
- First Minister: Michelle O'Neill, Sinn Féin since 3 February 2024
- deputy First Minister: Emma Little-Pengelly, DUP since 3 February 2024
- Leader of the Opposition: Matthew O'Toole, SDLP since 3 February 2024

Structure
- Seats: 90
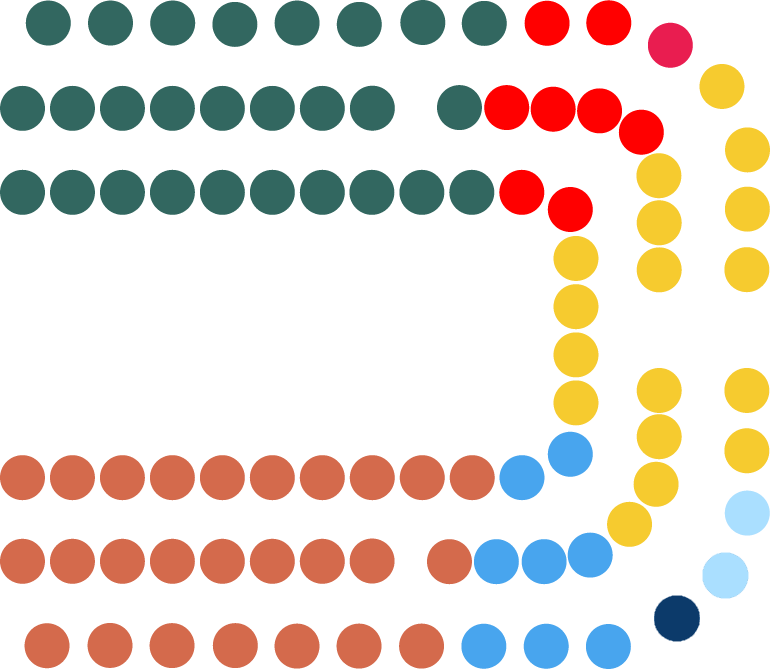
- Political groups: Executive (77): Sinn Féin (27) N; DUP (25) U; Alliance (17) O; UUP (8) U; Official Opposition (8): SDLP (8) N; Other Opposition (4): TUV (1) U; PBP (1) O; Independent Unionist (2) U; Speaker (1): Speaker (1)
- Committees: 16: Executive Office; Agriculture, Environment and Rural Affairs; Communities; Economy; Education; Finance; Health; Infrastructure; Justice; Assembly and Executive Review; Audit; Business; Procedures; Public Accounts; Standards and Privileges
- Length of term: No more than 5 years
- Authority: Northern Ireland Act 1998
- Salary: £67,200

Elections
- Voting system: Single transferable vote
- First election: 25 June 1998
- Last election: 5 May 2022
- Next election: On or before 6 May 2027
- Redistricting: Recommendations made by the Boundary Commission; confirmed by the Secretary of State

Meeting place
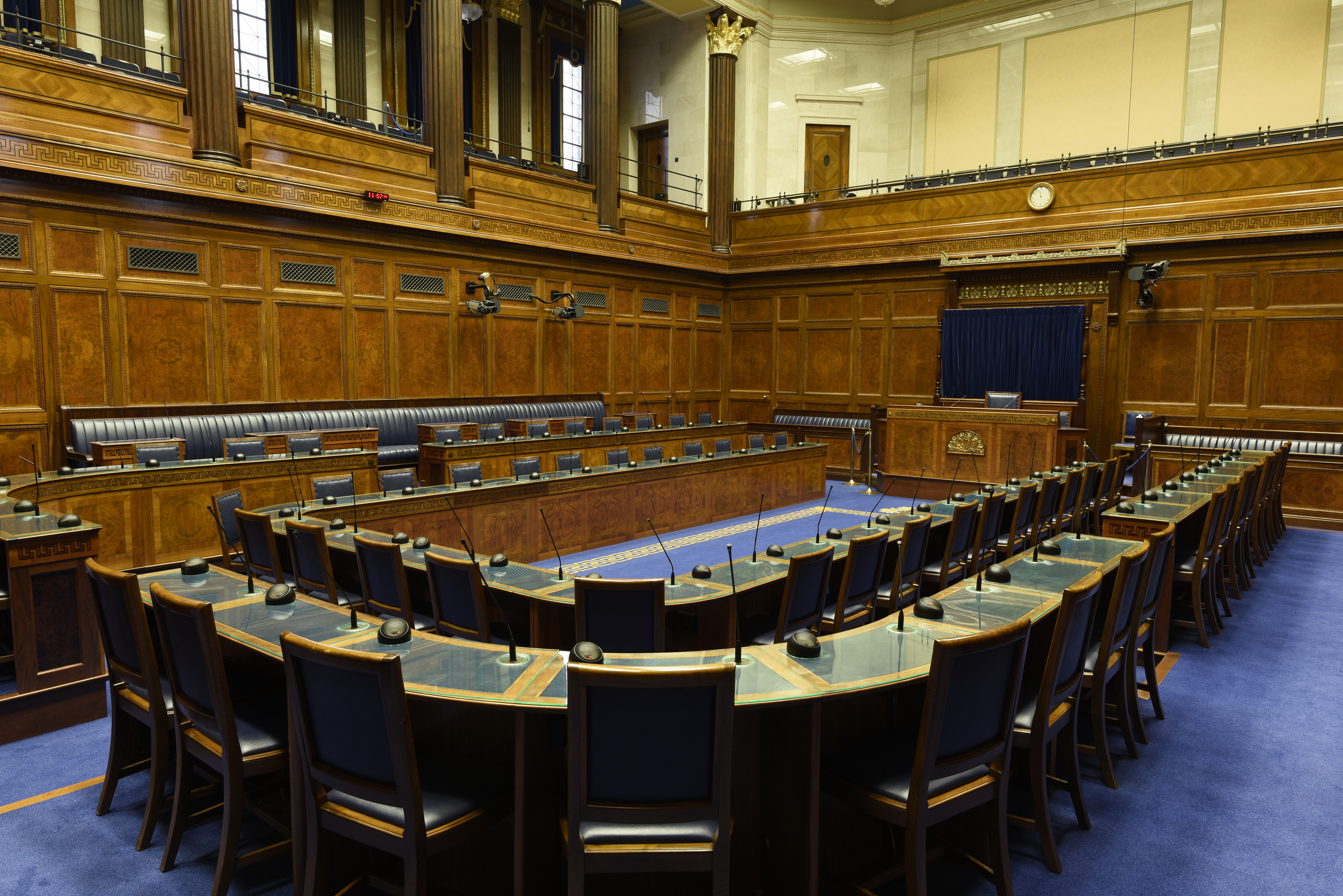
- Assembly Chamber, Parliament Buildings
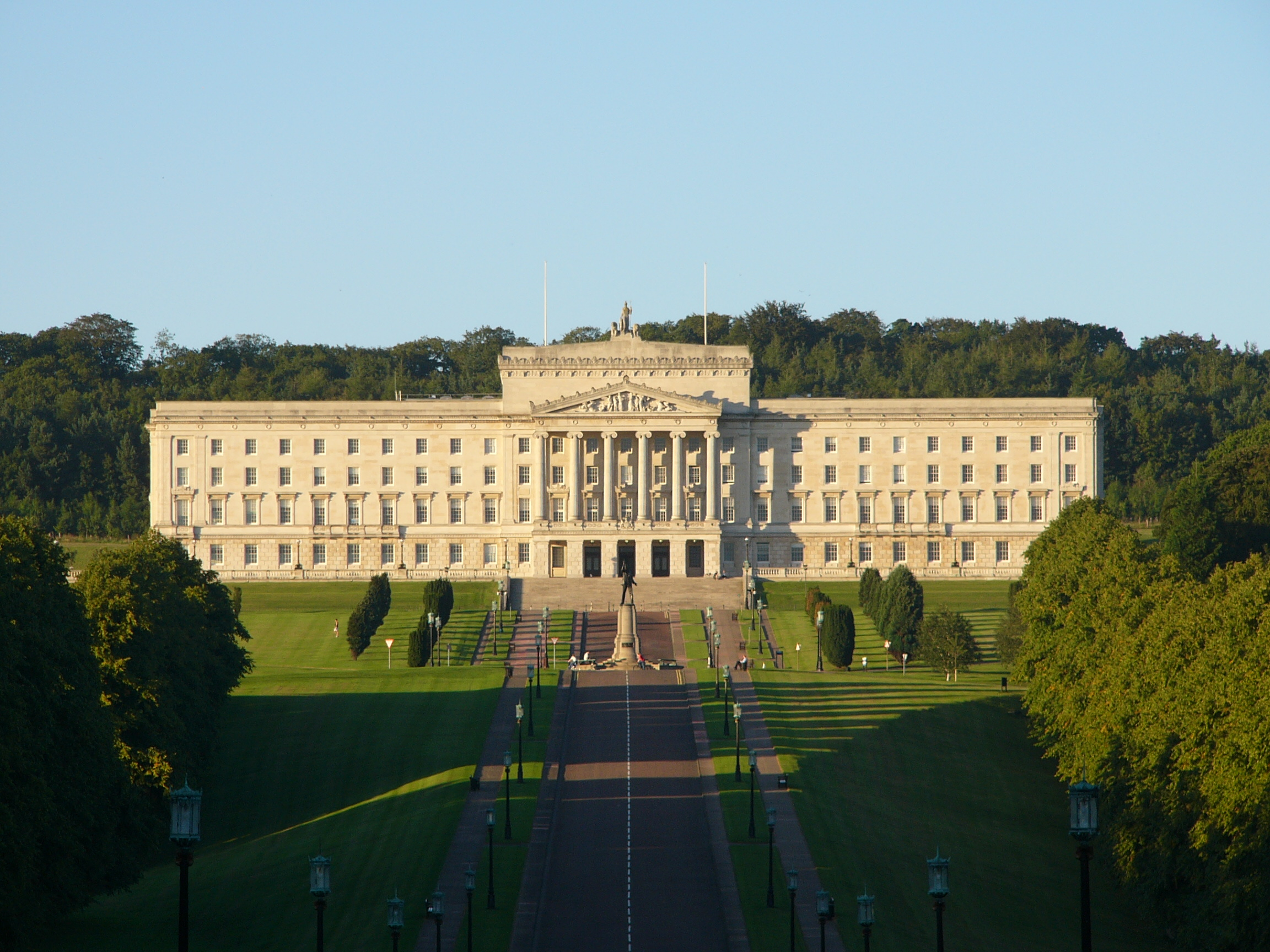
- Parliament Buildings, Stormont, Belfast, Northern Ireland

Website
- www.niassembly.gov.uk

Rules
- Standing Orders of the Northern Ireland Assembly

The Northern Ireland Assembly (Irish: Tionól Thuaisceart Éireann; Ulster Scots: Norlin Airlan Assemblie), often referred to by the metonym Stormont, is the devolved unicameral legislature of Northern Ireland. It has power to legislate in a wide range of areas that are not explicitly reserved to the Parliament of the United Kingdom, and to appoint the Northern Ireland Executive. It sits at Parliament Buildings at Stormont in Belfast.

The Assembly is a unicameral, democratically elected body comprising 90 members known as members of the Legislative Assembly (MLAs). Members are elected under the single transferable vote form of proportional representation (STV-PR). In turn, the Assembly selects most of the ministers of the Northern Ireland Executive using the principle of power-sharing under the D'Hondt method to ensure that Northern Ireland's largest voting blocs, British unionists and Irish nationalists, both participate in governing the region. The Assembly's standing orders allow for certain contentious motions to require a cross-community vote; in addition to requiring the support of an overall majority of members, such votes must also be supported by a majority within both blocs in order to pass.

The Assembly is one of two "mutually inter-dependent" institutions created under the 1998 Good Friday Agreement, the other being the North/South Ministerial Council with the Republic of Ireland. The Agreement aimed to end Northern Ireland's violent 30-year Troubles. The first Assembly election was held in June 1998.

== History ==
=== Previous legislatures ===
From June 1921 until March 1972, the devolved legislature for Northern Ireland was the Parliament of Northern Ireland, established by the Government of Ireland Act 1920 and meeting from 1932 at Stormont, just outside Belfast. The Parliament always had an Ulster Unionist Party (UUP) majority and always elected a UUP local administration. For its first two elections it used proportional representation (Single transferable voting) but switched to First-past-the-post voting in 1929.

It was suspended by the UK Government on 30 March 1972 and formally abolished in 1973 under the Northern Ireland Constitution Act 1973.

Northern Ireland was subsequently administered by direct rule until 1999, with a brief exception in 1974. Attempts began to restore on a new basis that would see power shared between nationalists and unionists. To this end a new legislature, the Northern Ireland Assembly, was established in 1973 with a power-sharing Executive taking office in January 1974. However, this body was brought down by the Ulster Workers' Council strike in May 1974. Political discussions continued against the continued backdrop of the Troubles. In 1982, another Northern Ireland Assembly was established, initially as a body to scrutinise the actions of the Northern Ireland Civil Service and the Secretary of State, the UK Government minister with responsibility for Northern Ireland. It was not supported by Irish nationalists and was officially dissolved in 1986.

=== 1998–2002 ===
The Northern Ireland (Elections) Act 1998 formally established the Assembly in law under the name New Northern Ireland Assembly, in accordance with the Good Friday (or Belfast) Agreement. The first election of members of the New Northern Ireland Assembly was on 25 June 1998 and it first met on 1 July 1998. However, it only existed in "shadow" form until 2 December 1999 when full powers were devolved to the Assembly. Since then the Assembly has operated with several interruptions and has been suspended on six occasions:

- 11 February – 30 May 2000
- 10 August 2001 (24-hour suspension)
- 22 September 2001 (24-hour suspension)
- 14 October 2002 – 7 May 2007
- 9 January 2017 – 11 January 2020
- 3 February 2022 – 3 February 2024

Attempts to secure its operation on a permanent basis were initially frustrated by disagreements between the two main unionist parties (the Democratic Unionist Party (DUP) and the Ulster Unionist Party) and Sinn Féin. Unionist representatives refused to participate in the Good Friday Agreement's institutions alongside Sinn Féin until they were assured that the IRA had discontinued its activities, decommissioned its weapons, and disbanded.

=== 2002–2007 (suspension) ===
The Assembly's suspension from October 2002 to May 2007 occurred when unionist parties withdrew from the Northern Ireland Executive after Sinn Féin's offices at Stormont were raided by police, who were investigating allegations of intelligence gathering on behalf of the IRA by members of the party's support staff. The Assembly, already suspended, was dissolved on 28 April 2003 as scheduled, but the elections due the following month were postponed by the UK Government and were not held until November that year.

Although the Assembly remained suspended from 2002 until 2007, the members elected at the 2003 Assembly election were called together on 15 May 2006 under the Northern Ireland Act 2006 to meet in an Assembly to be technically known as "the Assembly established under the Northern Ireland Act 2006" for the purpose of electing a First Minister and deputy First Minister and choosing the members of an Executive before 25 November 2006 as a preliminary to the restoration of the Northern Ireland Executive.

Multi-party talks in October 2006 resulted in the St Andrews Agreement, wherein Sinn Féin committed to support the Police Service of Northern Ireland and the mechanism for nominating First and deputy First Ministers was changed. In May 2006, Ian Paisley, leader of the DUP, had refused Sinn Féin's nomination to be First Minister alongside Sinn Féin's chief negotiator, Martin McGuinness, as deputy First Minister; after the St Andrews Agreement, these positions were now chosen by larger parties only, while the holders of other positions were elected by sitting MLAs. Eileen Bell was appointed by the Secretary of State, Peter Hain, to be the interim speaker of the Assembly, with Francie Molloy and Jim Wells acting as deputy speakers. The Northern Ireland (St Andrews Agreement) Act 2006 repealed the Northern Ireland Act 2006 and disbanded "the Assembly".

The St Andrews Agreement Act provided for a "Transitional Assembly established under the Northern Ireland (St Andrews Agreement) Act 2006" – to continue to contribute to preparations for the restoration of devolved government. A person who was a member of the Northern Ireland Assembly was also a member of the Transitional Assembly, with the same speaker and deputy speaker as elected for "the Assembly". The Transitional Assembly first met on 24 November 2006 but proceedings were suspended due to a bomb threat by loyalist paramilitary Michael Stone. It was dissolved on 30 January 2007 when the election campaign for the next Northern Ireland Assembly started.

Subsequently, a new election to the suspended Northern Ireland Assembly was held on 7 March 2007. The DUP and Sinn Féin consolidated their positions as the two largest parties in the election and agreed to enter government together. Peter Hain signed a restoration order on 25 March 2007 allowing for the restoration of devolution at midnight on the following day. An administration was eventually established on 10 May with Ian Paisley as First Minister and Martin McGuinness as deputy First Minister.

=== 2007–2017 ===
This third Assembly was the first legislature in Northern Ireland to complete a full term since the Northern Ireland Parliament which convened between 1965 and 1969 and saw powers in relation to policing and justice transferred from Westminster on 12 April 2010. Peter Robinson succeeded Ian Paisley as First Minister and DUP leader in 2008.

A five-year term came into effect with the fourth Assembly elected in 2011. The subsequent period was dominated by issues of culture and dealing with the past which culminated in the Fresh Start Agreement in 2014. The first Official Opposition in the Assembly was formed by the UUP in the closing months of the fourth term. Following the election of the fifth Assembly in 2016, the DUP and Sinn Féin formed the fourth Executive, with Arlene Foster as First Minister and Martin McGuinness continuing as deputy First Minister.

=== 2017–2020 (suspension) ===
In the wake of the Renewable Heat Incentive scandal, McGuinness resigned from his post in January 2017, bringing an end to almost a decade of unbroken devolution. Sinn Féin withdrew from the Assembly, and a fresh election was held on 2 March 2017. Negotiations mediated by then Secretary of State James Brokenshire missed the three-week deadline provided in law for the formation of an Executive. The passing of an extended legal deadline of 29 June left decisions on funding allocations in the hands of the Northern Ireland Civil Service, and a budget for the ongoing 2017–18 financial year was passed by the UK Parliament. Over time, further legislation was passed for Northern Ireland at Westminster, repeatedly extending the deadline for Executive formation although no direct rule ministers were appointed during this suspension. In 2019, the UK Parliament enacted one such Bill to legalise same-sex marriage and liberalise abortion, in line with Great Britain (the rest of the UK) and the Republic of Ireland.

=== 2020–2022 ===
Talks eventually succeeded under a third Secretary of State Julian Smith. The sixth Assembly resumed on 11 January 2020, shortly before the UK's exit from the European Union.

In February 2021, DUP MLAs threatened to bring down the Assembly and force an early election in protest at Boris Johnson's Brexit deal, which would put a border in the Irish Sea.

On 3 February 2022, First Minister Paul Givan of the DUP resigned. Due to the power-sharing arrangements, this also caused the deputy First Minister to lose her position.

=== 2022–2024 (suspension) ===
Elections were held for a seventh assembly in May 2022. Sinn Féin emerged as the largest party, followed by the Democratic Unionist Party. The newly elected assembly met for the first time on 13 May 2022 and again on 30 May. However, at both these meetings, the DUP refused to assent to the election of a speaker as part of a protest against the Northern Ireland Protocol, which meant that the assembly could not continue other business, including the appointment of a new Executive. The incumbent speaker and incumbent ministers continued in office in caretaker roles.

After the deadline set by Westminster for restoring devolved government was missed, the Northern Ireland secretary was legally required to schedule the election in the following 12 weeks. However, the secretary extended the deadline for the formation of the executive by six weeks, with an option for a further six week extension, so that any Northern Ireland Assembly election that would occur due to a failure to form an executive would happen at some point in 2023. Further extension of the deadline to 8 February 2024 was brought about by legislation in the Westminster Parliament as a result of continued refusal by the DUP to form an executive.

=== Since 2024 ===
On 30 January 2024, leader of the DUP Jeffrey Donaldson announced that the DUP would restore an executive government on the condition that new legislation was passed by the UK House of Commons. A sitting of the assembly was called for 3 February 2024 at which Edwin Poots was elected as Speaker and a new executive, led by Michelle O'Neill (SF) as First Minister and Emma Little-Pengelly (DUP) as deputy First Minister was formed, restoring devolved government in Northern Ireland.

== Powers and functions ==
The Assembly has both legislative powers and responsibility for electing the Northern Ireland Executive. The First and deputy First Ministers were initially elected on a cross-community vote, although this was changed in 2006 and they are now appointed as leaders of the largest parties of the largest and second largest Assembly 'block' (understood to mean 'Unionist', 'Nationalist' and 'Other'). The Minister of Justice is appointed by cross-community agreement. The seven other ministerial positions are distributed among willing parties roughly proportionate to their share of seats in the Assembly by the D'Hondt method, with ministers chosen by the nominating officers of each party.

The Assembly has authority to legislate in a field of competences known as "transferred matters". These matters are not explicitly given in the Northern Ireland Act 1998. Rather they include any competence not explicitly retained by the Parliament at Westminster. Powers reserved by Westminster are divided into "excepted matters", which it retains indefinitely, and "reserved matters", which may be transferred to the competence of the Northern Ireland Assembly at a future date. A list of transferred, reserved and excepted matters is given below.

While the Assembly was in suspension, its legislative powers were exercised by the UK Government, which governs through procedures at Westminster. Laws that would have normally been within the competence of the Assembly were passed by the UK Parliament in the form of Orders-in-Council rather than Acts of the Assembly.

Further, when the Assembly is suspended, certain devolved matters revert to the remit of the British–Irish Intergovernmental Conference (BIIGC). The BIIGC guarantees the Government of Ireland a say in areas of bilateral co-operation and on those matters not yet devolved to the Assembly or the North/South Ministerial Council.

Acts of the Northern Ireland Assembly as with other subordinate legislatures are subject to judicial review. A law can be struck down if it is found to:

- exceed the competences of the Assembly;
- violate retained European Union law;
- are incompatible with human rights as codified in the European Convention on Human Rights; or
- discriminate against individuals on the grounds of political opinion or religious belief.

=== Transferred matters ===
A transferred matter is defined as "any matter which is not an excepted or reserved matter". There is therefore no full listing of transferred matters but they have been grouped into the responsibilities of the Northern Ireland Executive ministers:

- Agriculture, Environment and Rural Affairs
- Communities
- Economy
- Education
- Finance
- Health
- Infrastructure
- Justice
- First and deputy First Minister

=== Reserved matters ===
Reserved matters are outlined in Schedule 3 of the Northern Ireland Act 1998:

- Navigation (including merchant shipping)
- Civil aviation
- The foreshore, sea bed and subsoil and their natural resources
- Postal services
- Import and export controls, external trade
- National minimum wage
- Financial services
- Financial markets
- Intellectual property
- Units of measurement
- Telecommunications, Broadcasting, Internet services
- The National Lottery
- Xenotransplantation
- Surrogacy
- Human fertilisation and embryology
- Human genetics
- Consumer safety in relation to goods

=== Excepted matters ===
Excepted matters are outlined in Schedule 2 of the Northern Ireland Act 1998:

- The Crown
- Parliament
- International relations
- Defence
- Immigration and Nationality
- Taxation
- National insurance
- Elections
- Currency
- National security
- Nuclear energy
- Outer space
- Activities in Antarctica

== Procedure ==
The Assembly has three primary mechanisms to ensure effective power-sharing:

- in appointing ministers to the Executive (except for the Minister of Justice), the D'Hondt method is followed so that ministerial portfolios are divided among the parties in proportion to their strength in the Assembly. This means that all parties with a significant number of seats are entitled to at least one minister;
- certain resolutions must receive "cross community support", or the support of a minimum number of MLAs from both communities, to be passed by the Assembly. Every MLA is officially designated as either nationalist, unionist or other. The election of the speaker, appointment of the Minister of Justice, any changes to the standing orders and the adoption of certain money bills must all occur with cross-community support. The election of the First and deputy First Ministers previously occurred by parallel consent but the positions are now filled by appointment; and
- Most votes taken by the Assembly can be made dependent on cross-community support if a petition of concern is presented to the speaker. A petition of concern may be brought by 30 or more MLAs, with at least two parties or independent members who were elected to the Assembly as independents in the most recent election being represented among the petitioners. Petitions may not be brought on resolutions relating to sanctions of members, on votes relating to the general principles of a bill rather than specific provisions or passage, and matters relating to the full implementation of paragraph 2.2.4 of Annex B of Part 2 of The New Decade, New Approach Deal as specified in the standing orders of the Assembly. In cases where a petition is properly filed, a vote on proposed legislation will only pass if supported by a weighted majority (60%) of members voting, including at least 40% of each of the nationalist and unionist designations present and voting. Effectively this means that, provided enough MLAs from a given community agree, that community (or a sufficiently large party in that community) can exercise a veto over the Assembly's decisions. The purpose is to protect each community from legislation that would favour the other community.

The Assembly has the power to call for witnesses and documents, if the relevant responsibility has been transferred to its remit. Proceedings are covered by privilege in defamation law.

== Composition ==
The Assembly's composition is laid down in the Northern Ireland Act 1998. It initially had 108 members (MLAs) elected from 18 six-member constituencies on the basis of universal adult suffrage and the single transferable vote.

Under the Assembly Members (Reduction of Numbers) Act (Northern Ireland) 2016 the number of MLAs per constituency was reduced from 6 to 5, leaving a total of 90 seats. This took effect at the March 2017 election. The constituencies used are the same as those used for elections to the United Kingdom Parliament at Westminster.

The Northern Ireland Act 1998 provides that, unless the Assembly is dissolved early, elections should occur once every four years on the first Thursday in May. The Northern Ireland (Miscellaneous Provisions) Act 2014 was passed to bring the Northern Ireland Assembly into line with the other devolved legislatures and to extend each Assembly term to five years instead of four. The second election to the Assembly was delayed by the UK government until 26 November 2003. The Assembly is dissolved shortly before the holding of elections on a day chosen by the Secretary of State. After each election the Assembly must meet within eight days. The Assembly can vote to dissolve itself early by a two-thirds majority of the total number of its members. It is also automatically dissolved if it is unable to elect a First Minister and deputy First Minister (effectively joint first ministers, the only distinction being in the titles) within six weeks of its first meeting or of those positions becoming vacant. There have been six elections to the Assembly since 1998.

=== Designations ===
The Assembly uses a consociational system. Each MLA is free to designate themselves as "Nationalist", "Unionist", or "other", as they see fit, the only requirement being that no member may change their designation more than once during an Assembly session.

The system has been criticised by some, in particular the cross-community Alliance Party, as entrenching sectarian divisions. Alliance supports ending the official designation of identity requirement and the taking of important votes on the basis of an ordinary super-majority, as does the largest unionist party, the DUP.

Number of MLAs by designation over time
| Year | Designation | | |
| Year | Unionist | Nationalist | Other |
|---|---|---|---|
| 1998 | 58 | 42 | 8 |
Three Alliance MLAs and one NIWC MLA temporarily re-designate as Unionist, and one NIWC MLA temporarily as Nationalist, to support the re-election of Trimble and Durkan to the offices of First Minister and deputy First Minister
| 2 November 2001 | 59 | 43 | 6 |
| 5 November 2001 | 62 | 43 | 3 |
| 12 November 2001 | 59 | 43 | 6 |
| 9 September 2002 | 58 | 42 | 8 |
| 2003 | 59 | 42 | 7 |
| 2007 | 55 | 44 | 9 |
| 2011 | 56 | 43 | 9 |
| 2016 | 56 | 40 | 12 |
| 2017 | 40 | 39 | 11 |
| 2022 | 37 | 35 | 18 |

Proportion of seats obtained at each election to the Northern Ireland Assembly by those members designated as Unionist, those members designated as Nationalist and those members designated as Other.

=== Executive and Opposition ===
Which parties can appoint ministers to the Northern Ireland Executive is determined by a combination of mandatory coalition, the D'Hondt method and cross-community support, depending on the role, as explained above. Coalitions of between three and five parties have governed over the Assembly's history. The Executive of the Sixth Assembly was formed on 11 January 2020.

Northern Ireland Executive
| Portfolio | Minister | Party | Term |
|---|---|---|---|
Executive Ministers
| First Minister | Michelle O'Neill | Sinn Féin | 2024–present |
| Deputy First Minister | Emma Little-Pengelly | DUP | 2024–present |
| Agriculture, Environment and Rural Affairs | Andrew Muir | Alliance | 2024–present |
| Communities | Gordon Lyons | DUP | 2024–present |
| Economy | Caoimhe Archibald | Sinn Féin | 2025–present |
| Education | Paul Givan | DUP | 2024–present |
| Finance | John O'Dowd | Sinn Féin | 2025–present |
| Health | Robbie Butler | UUP | 2026–present |
| Infrastructure | Liz Kimmins | Sinn Féin | 2025–present |
| Justice | Naomi Long | Alliance | 2024–present |
Also attending Executive meetings
| Junior Minister (assisting the First Minister) | Aisling Reilly | Sinn Féin | 2024–present |
| Junior Minister (assisting the deputy First Minister) | Pam Cameron | DUP | 2024–present |
=== Changes 8 May 2024 ===
| Economy | Deirdre Hargey | Sinn Féin | 2024 (interim) |
=== Changes 28 May 2024 ===
| Economy | Conor Murphy | Sinn Féin | 2024–2025 |
| Health | Mike Nesbitt | UUP | 2024–2026 |
=== Changes 3 February 2025 ===
| Economy | Caoimhe Archibald | Sinn Féin | 2025–present |
| Finance | John O'Dowd | Sinn Féin | 2025–present |
| Infrastructure | Liz Kimmins | Sinn Féin | 2025–present |
=== Changes 29 September 2025 ===
| Junior Minister (assisting the deputy First Minister) | Joanne Bunting | DUP | 2025–present |
=== Changes 18 August 2026 ===
| Health | Mike Nesbitt | UUP | 2024–2026 |
=== Changes 20 August 2026 ===
| Health | Robbie Butler | UUP | 2026–present |

Unlike the United Kingdom Parliament and the Oireachtas (Irish Parliament), the Assembly had no provision for an official opposition to hold governing parties to account until legislation was passed in 2016. A party may now form or join an Assembly Opposition, granting it additional speaking, scrutiny and funding rights, if it was entitled to Ministerial roles under the D'Hondt method and declined them, or if it wins 8% or more of the seats. This opportunity was qualified for and taken by the UUP and SDLP following the 2016 election. Even within the Executive, however, the parties (which have collectively held large majorities in the Assembly) have frequently voted against each other due to political and/or policy differences.

=== Historical participation ===
Alongside independents, a total of 15 parties have held seats in the Assembly since 1998:

Unionist:

- Ulster Unionist Party
- Democratic Unionist Party
- Progressive Unionist Party
- UK Independence Party
- Traditional Unionist Voice
- NI21
- United Unionist Coalition
- UK Unionist Party
- Northern Ireland Unionist Party

Nationalist:

- Social Democratic and Labour Party
- Sinn Féin

Other:

- Alliance Party of Northern Ireland
- Green Party Northern Ireland
- People Before Profit
- Northern Ireland Women's Coalition

=== Election results and changes ===
The course of the Assembly saw a marked shift in party allegiance among voters. At the 2003 election, the DUP and Sinn Féin displaced the more moderate UUP and SDLP as the largest parties in the unionist and nationalist blocks. The parties only agreed to share power after four years of negotiations and a new election.

The DUP, Sinn Féin, SDLP and UUP have remained the largest parties in the Assembly and so far the only ones entitled to ministerial roles in the Executive under the D'Hondt method. However, there has been growing support for parties designated "Other". The centrist Alliance party secured the roles of Speaker from 1998 to 2007 and Minister of Justice from 2010 to 2016 (and again from 11 January 2020) thanks to cross-community support, and has seen an increase in its seat wins from 6 to 8. While the NI Women's Coalition disbanded in 2003, two leftist parties, the Green Party in Northern Ireland and People Before Profit, won their first seats, in 2007 and 2016, respectively.

A rapidly shifting landscape of smaller unionist parties has also been a feature of the Assembly. In 1999 the UK Unionist Party lost four of its five MLAs, disagreeing over a protest against Sinn Féin. The four formed the NI Unionist Party, which again suffered a split and won no seats in the 2003 election. That election also saw the electoral demise of a loose trio of independently elected unionists who had united as the United Unionist Coalition. Minor unionist parties flourished again after the 2011 election, which saw the disappearance of the PUP from the Assembly and the election of the TUV, a splinter group from the DUP opposed to the St Andrews Agreement. In 2012, a suspended UUP member became UKIP's first MLA, and in 2013, two UUP MLAs resigned to form the progressive NI21, which later split. Of these only the TUV survived the 2016 and 2017 elections.

Disagreements within the Executive precipitated the resignation of the UUP in 2015, and following the 2016 election they and the SDLP formed the first Assembly Opposition. The row also saw Alliance relinquish its Justice role, joining the Greens, PBPA and TUV in unofficial opposition. Independent unionist Claire Sugden gained the cross-community support needed to take over the Ministry of Justice.

A 5th Executive was formed on 11 January 2020 following the 2017 election results, which saw the unionist block lose its Assembly majority for the first time. The usual four largest parties had won enough seats to win ministerial roles under D'Hondt (the DUP three, Sinn Féin two and the SDLP and UUP one each provided neither of them choose to enter opposition). With the reduction in the number of Assembly seats, the 8% threshold now amounts to eight rather than nine seats, qualifying Alliance to enter official opposition had they chosen to so, which they did not. The Greens retained their two seats and the TUV and Claire Sugden their single seats, while People Before Profit now held only one seat.

The 6th Executive, formed on 3 February 2024, is notable in several respects: Sinn Féin became the largest party in the 2022 election and took the role of First Minister as well as both economic portfolios, and the SDLP for the first time did not qualify for any seats in the Executive, instead forming the Official Opposition.

The table below details changes in members' allegiances and parties' seat possessions.

Historical composition of the Northern Ireland Assembly
| Body | Date | Event | Seats | Party | | | | | | | | | | | | | | | | | | | |
| Body | Date | Event | Seats | Speaker | Ind. N | Ind. O | Ind. U | UUP (U) | SDLP (N) | DUP (U) | SF (N) | APNI (O) | PUP (U) | Gre. (O) | TUV (U) | PBP (O) | UKIP (U) | NI21 (U) | UUC (U) | UKUP (U) | NIUP (U) | NIWC (O) | Vacant |
|---|---|---|---|---|---|---|---|---|---|---|---|---|---|---|---|---|---|---|---|---|---|---|---|
| 1st Assembly | 25 Jun 1998 | election | 108 | | | | | | | | | | | | | | | | | | | | |
| 1st Assembly | 25 Jun 1998 | election | 108 | 0 | 0 | 0 | 3 | 28 | 24 | 20 | 18 | 6 | 2 | 0 | | | | | | 5 | | 2 | 0 |
| 1st Assembly | 1 Jul 1998 | commencement | 108 | 1 | 0 | 0 | 3 | 28 ♠ | 24 ♠ | 20 ♠ | 18 ♠ | 5 | 2 | 0 | | | | | | 5 | | 2 | 0 |
| 1st Assembly | 21 Sep 1998 | party formation | 108 | 1 | 0 | 0 | 0 | 28 ♠ | 24 ♠ | 20 ♠ | 18 ♠ | 5 | 2 | 0 | | | | | 3 | 5 | | 2 | 0 |
| 1st Assembly | 4 Jan 1999 | resignation from party | 108 | 1 | 0 | 0 | 4 | 28 ♠ | 24 ♠ | 20 ♠ | 18 ♠ | 5 | 2 | 0 | | | | | 3 | 1 | | 2 | 0 |
| 1st Assembly | 24 Mar 1999 | party formation | 108 | 1 | 0 | 0 | 0 | 28 ♠ | 24 ♠ | 20 ♠ | 18 ♠ | 5 | 2 | 0 | | | | | 3 | 1 | 4 | 2 | 0 |
| 1st Assembly | 1 Dec 1999 | expulsion from party | 108 | 1 | 0 | 0 | 1 | 28 ♠ | 24 ♠ | 20 ♠ | 18 ♠ | 5 | 2 | 0 | | | | | 3 | 1 | 3 | 2 | 0 |
| 1st Assembly | 9 Nov 2001 | expulsion from party | 108 | 1 | 0 | 0 | 2 | 27 ♠ | 24 ♠ | 20 ♠ | 18 ♠ | 5 | 2 | 0 | | | | | 3 | 1 | 3 | 2 | 0 |
| 1st Assembly | 1 Apr 2002 | accession to party | 108 | 1 | 0 | 0 | 1 | 27 ♠ | 24 ♠ | 21 ♠ | 18 ♠ | 5 | 2 | 0 | | | | | 3 | 1 | 3 | 2 | 0 |
| 1st Assembly | 30 Apr 2002 | accession to party | 108 | 1 | 0 | 0 | 0 | 27 ♠ | 24 ♠ | 22 ♠ | 18 ♠ | 5 | 2 | 0 | | | | | 3 | 1 | 3 | 2 | 0 |
| 1st Assembly | 11 Nov 2002 | resignation from party | 108 | 1 | 0 | 0 | 1 | 27 ♠ | 24 ♠ | 21 ♠ | 18 ♠ | 5 | 2 | 0 | | | | | 3 | 1 | 3 | 2 | 0 |
| 1st Assembly | 1 Apr 2003 | resignation from party | 108 | 1 | 1 | 0 | 1 | 27 ♠ | 23 ♠ | 21 ♠ | 18 ♠ | 5 | 2 | 0 | | | | | 3 | 1 | 3 | 2 | 0 |
| 1st Assembly | 18 Oct 2003 | resignation from party | 108 | 1 | 1 | 0 | 2 | 27 ♠ | 23 ♠ | 20 ♠ | 18 ♠ | 5 | 2 | 0 | | | | | 3 | 1 | 3 | 2 | 0 |
| 2nd Assembly | 26 Nov 2003 | election | 108 | | | | | | | | | | | | | | | | | | | | |
| 2nd Assembly | 26 Nov 2003 | election | 108 | 0 | 0 | 0 | 1 | 27 | 18 | 30 | 24 | 6 | 1 | 0 | | | | | 0 | 1 | 0 | 0 | 0 |
| 2nd Assembly | 18 Dec 2003 | resignation from party | 108 | 0 | 0 | 0 | 4 | 24 | 18 | 30 | 24 | 6 | 1 | 0 | | | | | 0 | 1 | 0 | 0 | 0 |
| 2nd Assembly | 5 Jan 2004 | accession to party | 108 | 0 | 0 | 0 | 1 | 24 | 18 | 33 | 24 | 6 | 1 | 0 | | | | | 0 | 1 | 0 | 0 | 0 |
| 2nd Assembly | 4 Jul 2005 | suspension from party | 108 | 0 | 0 | 0 | 2 | 24 | 18 | 32 | 24 | 6 | 1 | 0 | | | | | 0 | 1 | 0 | 0 | 0 |
| 2nd Assembly | 10 Apr 2006 | speaker appointment | 108 | 1 | 0 | 0 | 2 | 24 | 18 | 32 | 24 | 5 | 1 | 0 | | | | | 0 | 1 | 0 | 0 | 0 |
| 2nd Assembly | 25 Sep 2006 | death | 108 | 1 | 0 | 0 | 2 | 24 | 18 | 32 | 23 | 5 | 1 | 0 | | | | | 0 | 1 | 0 | 0 | 1 |
| 2nd Assembly | 15 Jan 2007 | resignation from party | 108 | 1 | 0 | 1 | 2 | 24 | 18 | 32 | 22 | 5 | 1 | 0 | | | | | 0 | 1 | 0 | 0 | 1 |
| 2nd Assembly | 2 Feb 2007 | resignation from party | 108 | 1 | 1 | 1 | 2 | 24 | 18 | 32 | 21 | 5 | 1 | 0 | | | | | 0 | 1 | 0 | 0 | 1 |
| 3rd Assembly | 7 Mar 2007 | election | 108 | | | | | | | | | | | | | | | | | | | | |
| 3rd Assembly | 7 Mar 2007 | election | 108 | 0 | 0 | 1 | 0 | 18 | 16 | 36 | 28 | 7 | 1 | 1 | | | 0 | | 0 | 0 | 0 | | 0 |
| 3rd Assembly | 8 May 2007 | commencement | 108 | 1 | 0 | 1 | 0 | 18 ♠ | 16 ♠ | 35 ♠ | 28 ♠ | 7 | 1 | 1 | | | 0 | | 0 | 0 | 0 | | 0 |
| 3rd Assembly | 29 Nov 2007 | resignation from party | 108 | 1 | 1 | 1 | 0 | 18 ♠ | 16 ♠ | 35 ♠ | 27 ♠ | 7 | 1 | 1 | | | 0 | | 0 | 0 | 0 | | 0 |
| 3rd Assembly | 31 Mar 2010 | resignation from party | 108 | 1 | 1 | 1 | 1 | 17 ♠ | 16 ♠ | 35 ♠ | 27 ♠ | 7 | 1 | 1 | | | 0 | | 0 | | | | 0 |
| 3rd Assembly | 12 Apr 2010 | accession to executive | 108 | 1 | 1 | 1 | 1 | 17 ♠ | 16 ♠ | 35 ♠ | 27 ♠ | 7 ♠ | 1 | 1 | | | 0 | | 0 | | | | 0 |
| 3rd Assembly | 3 Jun 2010 | resignation from party | 108 | 1 | 1 | 1 | 2 | 17 ♠ | 16 ♠ | 35 ♠ | 27 ♠ | 7 ♠ | 0 | 1 | | | 0 | | 0 | | | | 0 |
| 3rd Assembly | 3 Jan 2011 | resignation from party | 108 | 1 | 1 | 1 | 3 | 16 ♠ | 16 ♠ | 35 ♠ | 27 ♠ | 7 ♠ | 0 | 1 | | | 0 | | 0 | | | | 0 |
| 4th Assembly | 5 May 2011 | election | 108 | | | | | | | | | | | | | | | | | | | | |
| 4th Assembly | 5 May 2011 | election | 108 | 0 | 0 | 0 | 1 | 16 | 14 | 38 | 29 | 8 | 0 | 1 | 1 | 0 | 0 | | 0 | | | | 0 |
| 4th Assembly | 12 May 2011 | commencement | 108 | 1 | 0 | 0 | 1 | 16 ♠ | 14 ♠ | 37 ♠ | 29 ♠ | 8 ♠ | 0 | 1 | 1 | 0 | 0 | | 0 | | | | 0 |
| 4th Assembly | 27 Jan 2012 | suspension from party | 108 | 1 | 0 | 0 | 2 | 15 ♠ | 14 ♠ | 37 ♠ | 29 ♠ | 8 ♠ | 0 | 1 | 1 | 0 | 0 | | 0 | | | | 0 |
| 4th Assembly | 4 Oct 2012 | accession to party | 108 | 1 | 0 | 0 | 1 | 15 ♠ | 14 ♠ | 37 ♠ | 29 ♠ | 8 ♠ | 0 | 1 | 1 | 0 | 1 | | | | | | 0 |
| 4th Assembly | 14 Feb 2013 | resignation from party | 108 | 1 | 0 | 0 | 2 | 14 ♠ | 14 ♠ | 37 ♠ | 29 ♠ | 8 ♠ | 0 | 1 | 1 | 0 | 1 | | | | | | 0 |
| 4th Assembly | 15 Feb 2013 | resignation from party | 108 | 1 | 0 | 0 | 3 | 13 ♠ | 14 ♠ | 37 ♠ | 29 ♠ | 8 ♠ | 0 | 1 | 1 | 0 | 1 | | | | | | 0 |
| 4th Assembly | 6 Jun 2013 | party formation | 108 | 1 | 0 | 0 | 1 | 13 ♠ | 14 ♠ | 37 ♠ | 29 ♠ | 8 ♠ | 0 | 1 | 1 | 0 | 1 | 2 | | | | | 0 |
| 4th Assembly | 18 Apr 2014 | independent death | 108 | 1 | 0 | 0 | 0 | 13 ♠ | 14 ♠ | 37 ♠ | 29 ♠ | 8 ♠ | 0 | 1 | 1 | 0 | 1 | 2 | | | | | 1 |
| 4th Assembly | 6 May 2014 | independent co-option | 108 | 1 | 0 | 0 | 1 | 13 ♠ | 14 ♠ | 37 ♠ | 29 ♠ | 8 ♠ | 0 | 1 | 1 | 0 | 1 | 2 | | | | | 0 |
| 4th Assembly | 3 Jul 2014 | resignation from party | 108 | 1 | 0 | 0 | 2 | 13 ♠ | 14 ♠ | 37 ♠ | 29 ♠ | 8 ♠ | 0 | 1 | 1 | 0 | 1 | 1 | | | | | 0 |
| 4th Assembly | 13 Oct 2014 | retirement from speaker & seat | 108 | 0 | 0 | 0 | 2 | 13 ♠ | 14 ♠ | 37 ♠ | 29 ♠ | 8 ♠ | 0 | 1 | 1 | 0 | 1 | 1 | | | | | 1 |
| 4th Assembly | 20 Oct 2014 | co-option in party | 108 | 0 | 0 | 0 | 2 | 13 ♠ | 14 ♠ | 38 ♠ | 29 ♠ | 8 ♠ | 0 | 1 | 1 | 0 | 1 | 1 | | | | | 0 |
| 4th Assembly | 12 Jan 2015 | speaker appointment | 108 | 1 | 0 | 0 | 2 | 13 ♠ | 14 ♠ | 38 ♠ | 28 ♠ | 8 ♠ | 0 | 1 | 1 | 0 | 1 | 1 | | | | | 0 |
| 4th Assembly | 1 Sep 2015 | resignation from executive | 108 | 1 | 0 | 0 | 2 | 13 | 14 ♠ | 38 ♠ | 28 ♠ | 8 ♠ | 0 | 1 | 1 | 0 | 1 | 1 | | | | | 0 |
| 5th Assembly | 5 May 2016 | election | 108 | | | | | | | | | | | | | | | | | | | | |
| 5th Assembly | 5 May 2016 | election | 108 | 0 | 0 | 0 | 1 | 16 | 12 | 38 | 28 | 8 | 0 | 2 | 1 | 2 | 0 | | | | | | 0 |
| 5th Assembly | 12 May 2016 | commencement | 108 | 1 | 0 | 0 | 1 ♠ | 16 ♦ | 12 ♦ | 37 ♠ | 28 ♠ | 8 | 0 | 2 | 1 | 2 | 0 | | | | | | 0 |
| 5th Assembly | 18 Dec 2016 | suspension from party | 108 | 1 | 0 | 0 | 1,1 ♠ | 16 ♦ | 12 ♦ | 36 ♠ | 28 ♠ | 8 | 0 | 2 | 1 | 2 | 0 | | | | | | 0 |
| 6th Assembly | 2 Mar 2017 | election | 90 | | | | | | | | | | | | | | | | | | | | |
| 6th Assembly | 2 Mar 2017 | election | 90 | 0 | 0 | 0 | 1 | 10 | 12 | 28 | 27 | 8 | 0 | 2 | 1 | 1 | 0 | | | | | | 0 |
| 6th Assembly | 9 May 2018 | expulsion from party | 90 | 0 | 0 | 0 | 2 | 10 | 12 | 27 | 27 | 8 | 0 | 2 | 1 | 1 | 0 | | | | | | 0 |
| 6th Assembly | 11 Feb 2019 | resignation from party? | 90 | 0 | 1 | 0 | 2 | 10 | 11 | 27 | 27 | 8 | 0 | 2 | 1 | 1 | 0 | | | | | | 0 |
| 6th Assembly | 10 Jan 2020 | seat returned? | 90 | 0 | 0 | 0 | 2 | 10 | 12 | 27 | 27 | 8 | 0 | 2 | 1 | 1 | 0 | | | | | | 0 |
| 6th Assembly | 11 Jan 2020 | commencement | 90 | 1 | 0 | 0 | 2 | 10 ♠ | 12 ♠ | 27 ♠ | 26 ♠ | 8 ♠ | 0 | 2 | 1 | 1 | 0 | | | | | | 0 |
| 6th Assembly | 3 Mar 2020 | resignation from party | 90 | 1 | 0 | 1 | 2 | 10 ♠ | 12 ♠ | 27 ♠ | 26 ♠ | 7 ♠ | 0 | 2 | 1 | 1 | 0 | | | | | | 0 |
| 6th Assembly | 1 July 2021 | resignation from party | 90 | 1 | 0 | 1 | 3 | 10 ♠ | 12 ♠ | 26 ♠ | 26 ♠ | 7 ♠ | 0 | 2 | 1 | 1 | 0 | | | | | | 0 |
| 6th Assembly | 19 Feb 2022 | death | 90 | 1 | 0 | 1 | 3 | 10 ♠ | 12 ♠ | 25 ♠ | 26 ♠ | 7 ♠ | 0 | 2 | 1 | 1 | 0 | | | | | | 1 |
| 6th Assembly | 14 Mar 2022 | co-option | 90 | 1 | 0 | 1 | 3 | 10 ♠ | 12 ♠ | 26 ♠ | 26 ♠ | 7 ♠ | 0 | 2 | 1 | 1 | 0 | | | | | | 0 |
| 7th Assembly | 5 May 2022 | election | 90 | | | | | | | | | | | | | | | | | | | | |
| 7th Assembly | 5 May 2022 | election | 90 | 0 | 0 | 0 | 2 | 9 | 8 | 25 | 27 | 17 | 0 | 0 | 1 | 1 | | | | | | | 0 |
| 7th Assembly | 25 Jul 2022 | opposition recognition | 90 | 0 | 0 | 0 | 2 | 9 | 8 ♦ | 25 | 27 | 17 | 0 | 0 | 1 | 1 | | | | | | | 0 |
| 7th Assembly | 3 February 2024 | commencement | 90 | 1 | 0 | 0 | 2 | 9 ♠ | 8 ♦ | 24 ♠ | 27 ♠ | 17 ♠ | 0 | 0 | 1 | 1 | | | | | | | 0 |
| 7th Assembly | 3 February 2024 | suspension from party | 90 | 1 | 1 | 0 | 2 | 9 ♠ | 7 ♦ | 24 ♠ | 27 ♠ | 17 ♠ | 0 | 0 | 1 | 1 | | | | | | | 0 |
| 7th Assembly | 9 July 2024 | party gains independent seat | 90 | 1 | 1 | 0 | 1 | 9 ♠ | 7 ♦ | 25 ♠ | 27 ♠ | 17 ♠ | 0 | 0 | 1 | 1 | | | | | | | 0 |
| 7th Assembly | 20 August 2024 | whip restored | 90 | 1 | 0 | 0 | 1 | 9 ♠ | 8 ♦ | 25 ♠ | 27 ♠ | 17 ♠ | 0 | 0 | 1 | 1 | | | | | | | 0 |
♠ = Northern Ireland Executive; ♦ = Assembly Opposition.
Parties listed exclude those which have never held seats in the body; events exclude simple co-options within parties. Full lists of co-options can be viewed on the "Members of the nth NI Assembly" pages (links in first column).

=== Election results by constituency ===
Some parties, which rarely or never won seats in the same constituency, are grouped together for ease of reading. For further clarity, see footnotes on headers.

| Constituency | Yr | Total | | | | | | | | | | | | Gained by | Formerly held by |
| Constituency | Yr | Total | PBP | GP/WC/ Lab (Note: The Green Party, Northern Ireland Women's Coalition and Northern Ireland Labour Party were separate parties who each had a raison d'étre that was not focused on the constitutional question (women's interests, green politics and trade union interests, respectively). Since 1973, the parties only ever won constituency seats in Belfast South, Belfast East and North Down. Except for the 1996 Forum, when Labour and the Women's Coalition both had 2 top-up seats each, the parties have never had elected representation simultaneously. In territorial constituencies, seats under the GP/WC/Lab heading prior to 2003 belonged to the Women's Coalition, and after 2003 belonged to the Greens.) | Sinn Féin | SDLP | APNI | UUP | DUP | TUV/ UKUP (Note: The TUV and UKUP were separate conservative unionist parties that asserted support for the rule of law. The two parties never held elected representation in Northern Ireland simultaneously. Seats under the TUV/UKUP heading prior to 2007 belonged to UKUP, and after 2007 belonged to TUV.) | PUP/UDP/ VUPP (Note: The PUP, UDP and VUPP were separate paramilitary-linked unionist parties. Except for the 1996 Forum, when the PUP and UDP had 2 top-up seats each, the parties never had elected representation in Northern Ireland simultaneously. Seats under the PUP/VUPP/UDP heading prior to 1982 belonged to the VUPP, and after 1982 belonged to the PUP.) | UPUP/UPNI (Note: The Unionist Party of Northern Ireland and the Ulster Popular Unionist Party were separate pro-devolution unionist parties. The two parties did not hold seats in a Northern Ireland devolved legislature simultaneously. Seats under the UPUP/UPNI heading prior to 1982 belonged to the UPNI, and from 1982 onwards belonged to the UPUP.) | Ind. | Gained by | Formerly held by |
| Armagh (1973–1986) | 73 | 7 | | | | 3 | | 2 | 1 | | 1 | | | new constituency | |
| Armagh (1973–1986) | 75 | 7 | | | | 2 | | 2 | 1 | | 2 | | | VUPP | SDLP |
| Armagh (1973–1986) | 82 | 7 | | | 1 | 2 | | 3 | 1 | | | | | Sinn Féin | VUPP |
| Armagh (1973–1986) | 82 | 7 | | | 1 | 2 | | 3 | 1 | | | | | UUP | VUPP |
| Armagh (1973–1986) | 83 (Note: By-election, after the SDLP's Seamus Mallon was disqualified, as he was a Senator in the Irish Seanad at the time. The SDLP did not stand in the ensuing by-election.) | 7 | | | 1 | 1 | | 4 | 1 | | | | | UUP | SDLP |
| Armagh (1973–1986) | 96 | not used after the Assembly's dissolution in 1986; subsumed into East Londonderry, Foyle and Mid Ulster by the time of the 1996 Northern Ireland Forum election | | | | | | | | | | | | | |
| Armagh (1973–1986) | 98 | not used after the Assembly's dissolution in 1986; subsumed into East Londonderry, Foyle and Mid Ulster by the time of the 1996 Northern Ireland Forum election | | | | | | | | | | | | | |
| Armagh (1973–1986) | 03 | not used after the Assembly's dissolution in 1986; subsumed into East Londonderry, Foyle and Mid Ulster by the time of the 1996 Northern Ireland Forum election | | | | | | | | | | | | | |
| Armagh (1973–1986) | 07 | not used after the Assembly's dissolution in 1986; subsumed into East Londonderry, Foyle and Mid Ulster by the time of the 1996 Northern Ireland Forum election | | | | | | | | | | | | | |
| Armagh (1973–1986) | 11 | not used after the Assembly's dissolution in 1986; subsumed into East Londonderry, Foyle and Mid Ulster by the time of the 1996 Northern Ireland Forum election | | | | | | | | | | | | | |
| Armagh (1973–1986) | 16 | not used after the Assembly's dissolution in 1986; subsumed into East Londonderry, Foyle and Mid Ulster by the time of the 1996 Northern Ireland Forum election | | | | | | | | | | | | | |
| Armagh (1973–1986) | 17 | not used after the Assembly's dissolution in 1986; subsumed into East Londonderry, Foyle and Mid Ulster by the time of the 1996 Northern Ireland Forum election | | | | | | | | | | | | | |
| Armagh (1973–1986) | 22 | not used after the Assembly's dissolution in 1986; subsumed into East Londonderry, Foyle and Mid Ulster by the time of the 1996 Northern Ireland Forum election | | | | | | | | | | | | | |
| Londonderry (1973–1986) | 73 | 7 | | | | 3 | | 3 | | | 1 | | | new constituency | |
| Londonderry (1973–1986) | 75 | 7 | | | | 3 | | 2 | 1 | | 1 | | | DUP | UUP |
| Londonderry (1973–1986) | 82 | 7 | | | 1 | 2 | | 2 | 2 | | | | | Sinn Féin | SDLP |
| Londonderry (1973–1986) | 82 | 7 | | | 1 | 2 | | 2 | 2 | | | | | DUP | VUPP |
| Londonderry (1973–1986) | 96 | not used after the Assembly's dissolution in 1986; subsumed into East Londonderry, Foyle and Mid Ulster by the time of the 1996 Northern Ireland Forum election | | | | | | | | | | | | | |
| Londonderry (1973–1986) | 98 | not used after the Assembly's dissolution in 1986; subsumed into East Londonderry, Foyle and Mid Ulster by the time of the 1996 Northern Ireland Forum election | | | | | | | | | | | | | |
| Londonderry (1973–1986) | 03 | not used after the Assembly's dissolution in 1986; subsumed into East Londonderry, Foyle and Mid Ulster by the time of the 1996 Northern Ireland Forum election | | | | | | | | | | | | | |
| Londonderry (1973–1986) | 07 | not used after the Assembly's dissolution in 1986; subsumed into East Londonderry, Foyle and Mid Ulster by the time of the 1996 Northern Ireland Forum election | | | | | | | | | | | | | |
| Londonderry (1973–1986) | 11 | not used after the Assembly's dissolution in 1986; subsumed into East Londonderry, Foyle and Mid Ulster by the time of the 1996 Northern Ireland Forum election | | | | | | | | | | | | | |
| Londonderry (1973–1986) | 16 | not used after the Assembly's dissolution in 1986; subsumed into East Londonderry, Foyle and Mid Ulster by the time of the 1996 Northern Ireland Forum election | | | | | | | | | | | | | |
| Londonderry (1973–1986) | 17 | not used after the Assembly's dissolution in 1986; subsumed into East Londonderry, Foyle and Mid Ulster by the time of the 1996 Northern Ireland Forum election | | | | | | | | | | | | | |
| Londonderry (1973–1986) | 22 | not used after the Assembly's dissolution in 1986; subsumed into East Londonderry, Foyle and Mid Ulster by the time of the 1996 Northern Ireland Forum election | | | | | | | | | | | | | |
| North Antrim | 73 | 7 | – | – | – | 1 | 1 | 2 | 2 | – | 1 | | – | new constituency | |
| North Antrim | 75 | 7 | – | – | – | 1 | 1 | | 3 | – | 2 | | – | DUP | UUP |
| North Antrim | 75 | 7 | – | – | – | 1 | 1 | | 3 | – | 2 | | – | VUPP | UUP |
| North Antrim | 82 | 8 | – | – | – | 1 | 1 | 2 | 4 | – | – | | – | DUP | VUPP |
| North Antrim | 82 | 8 | – | – | – | 1 | 1 | 2 | 4 | – | – | | – | UUP | VUPP |
| North Antrim | 82 | 8 | – | – | – | 1 | 1 | 2 | 4 | – | – | | – | DUP | 1 new seat |
| North Antrim | 96 | 5 | – | – | – | 1 | – | 2 | 2 | – | – | | – | 3 seats abolished | DUP |
| North Antrim | 96 | 5 | – | – | – | 1 | – | 2 | 2 | – | – | | – | 3 seats abolished | DUP |
| North Antrim | 96 | 5 | – | – | – | 1 | – | 2 | 2 | – | – | | – | 3 seats abolished | Alliance |
| North Antrim | 98 | 6 | – | – | – | 1 | – | 2 | 3 | – | – | | – | DUP | 1 new seat |
| North Antrim | 03 | 6 | – | – | 1 | 1 | – | 1 | 3 | – | – | | – | Sinn Féin | UUP |
| North Antrim | 07 | 6 | – | – | 1 | 1 | – | 1 | 3 | – | – | | – | no change | |
| North Antrim | 11 | 6 | – | – | 1 | – | – | 1 | 3 | 1 | – | | – | TUV | SDLP |
| North Antrim | 16 | 6 | – | – | 1 | – | – | 1 | 3 | 1 | – | | – | no change | |
| North Antrim | 17 | 5 | – | – | 1 | – | – | 1 | 2 | 1 | – | | – | 1 seat abolished | DUP |
| North Antrim | 22 | 5 | – | – | 1 | – | 1 | 1 | 1 | 1 | – | | – | Alliance | DUP |
| East Antrim | 73 | part of North Antrim and South Antrim prior to 1996 | | | | | | | | | | | | | |
| East Antrim | 75 | part of North Antrim and South Antrim prior to 1996 | | | | | | | | | | | | | |
| East Antrim | 82 | part of North Antrim and South Antrim prior to 1996 | | | | | | | | | | | | | |
| East Antrim | 96 | 5 | | – | | | 1 | 2 | 2 | | | | | new constituency | |
| East Antrim | 98 | 6 | | – | | 1 | 1 | 2 | 1 | 1 | | | | UKUP | DUP |
| East Antrim | 98 | 6 | | – | | 1 | 1 | 2 | 1 | 1 | | | | SDLP | 1 new seat |
| East Antrim | 03 | 6 | | – | | | 1 | 2 | 3 | | | | | DUP | Sinn Féin |
| East Antrim | 03 | 6 | | – | | | 1 | 2 | 3 | | | | | DUP | UKUP |
| East Antrim | 07 | 6 | | – | | | 1 | 2 | 3 | | | | | no change | |
| East Antrim | 11 | 6 | | – | 1 | | 1 | 1 | 3 | | | | | Sinn Féin | UUP |
| East Antrim | 16 | 6 | | – | 1 | | 1 | 1 | 3 | | | | | no change | |
| East Antrim | 17 | 5 | | – | | | 1 | 2 | 2 | | | | | UUP | Sinn Féin |
| East Antrim | 17 | 5 | | – | | | 1 | 2 | 2 | | | | | DUP | 1 seat abolished |
| East Antrim | 22 | 5 | – | – | – | – | 2 | 1 | 2 | | | | – | Alliance | UUP |
| South Antrim | 73 | 8 | | – | | 1 | 1 | 3 | 1 | | 1 | | 1 | new constituency | |
| South Antrim | 75 | 8 | | – | | 1 | 1 | 1 | 2 | | 2 | 1 | | DUP | UUP |
| South Antrim | 75 | 8 | | – | | 1 | 1 | 1 | 2 | | 2 | 1 | | VUPP | UUP |
| South Antrim | 75 | 8 | | – | | 1 | 1 | 1 | 2 | | 2 | 1 | | UPNI | Ind U |
| South Antrim | 82 | 10 | | – | | 1 | 2 | 4 | 3 | | | | | DUP | VUPP |
| South Antrim | 82 | 10 | | – | | 1 | 2 | 4 | 3 | | | | | UUP | VUPP |
| South Antrim | 82 | 10 | | – | | 1 | 2 | 4 | 3 | | | | | UUP | UPNI |
| South Antrim | 82 | 10 | | – | | 1 | 2 | 4 | 3 | | | | | UUP | 2 new seats |
| South Antrim | 82 | 10 | | – | | 1 | 2 | 4 | 3 | | | | | Alliance | 2 new seats |
| South Antrim | 96 | 5 | | – | | 1 | | 2 | 2 | | | | | 5 seats abolished | Alliance |
| South Antrim | 96 | 5 | | – | | 1 | | 2 | 2 | | | | | 5 seats abolished | Alliance |
| South Antrim | 96 | 5 | | – | | 1 | | 2 | 2 | | | | | 5 seats abolished | UUP |
| South Antrim | 96 | 5 | | – | | 1 | | 2 | 2 | | | | | 5 seats abolished | UUP |
| South Antrim | 96 | 5 | | – | | 1 | | 2 | 2 | | | | | 5 seats abolished | DUP |
| South Antrim | 98 | 6 | | – | | 1 | 1 | 2 | 1 | 1 | | | | UKUP | DUP |
| South Antrim | 98 | 6 | | – | | 1 | 1 | 2 | 1 | 1 | | | | Alliance | 1 new seat |
| South Antrim | 03 | 6 | | – | | 1 | 1 | 2 | 2 | | | | | DUP | UKUP |
| South Antrim | 07 | 6 | | – | 1 | 1 | 1 | 1 | 2 | | | | | Sinn Féin | UUP |
| South Antrim | 11 | 6 | | – | 1 | | 1 | 1 | 3 | | | | | DUP | SDLP |
| South Antrim | 16 | 6 | | – | 1 | | 1 | 1 | 3 | | | | | no change | |
| South Antrim | 17 | 5 | | – | 1 | | 1 | 1 | 2 | | | | | 1 seat abolished | DUP |
| South Antrim | 22 | 5 | – | – | 1 | – | 1 | 1 | 2 | – | | | – | no change | |
| Belfast North | 73 | 6 | | – | | 1 | 1 | 3 | 1 | | | | | new constituency | |
| Belfast North | 75 | 6 | | – | | 1 | | 2 | 1 | | | 1 | 1 | UPNI | Alliance |
| Belfast North | 75 | 6 | | – | | 1 | | 2 | 1 | | | 1 | 1 | Ind U | UUP |
| Belfast North | 82 | 5 | | – | | 1 | 1 | 1 | 1 | | | | 1 | Alliance | UPNI |
| Belfast North | 82 | 5 | | – | | 1 | 1 | 1 | 1 | | | | 1 | 1 seat abolished | UUP |
| Belfast North | 96 | 5 | | – | 1 | 1 | | 1 | 2 | | | | | Sinn Féin | Alliance |
| Belfast North | 96 | 5 | | – | 1 | 1 | | 1 | 2 | | | | | DUP | Ind U |
| Belfast North | 98 | 6 | | – | 1 | 1 | | 1 | 1 | | 1 | | 1 | Ind U | DUP |
| Belfast North | 98 | 6 | | – | 1 | 1 | | 1 | 1 | | 1 | | 1 | PUP | 1 new seat |
| Belfast North | 03 | 6 | | – | 2 | 1 | | 1 | 2 | | | | | Sinn Féin | PUP |
| Belfast North | 03 | 6 | | – | 2 | 1 | | 1 | 2 | | | | | DUP | Ind U |
| Belfast North | 07 | 6 | | – | 2 | 1 | | 1 | 2 | | | | | no change | |
| Belfast North | 11 | 6 | | – | 2 | 1 | | | 3 | | | | | DUP | UUP |
| Belfast North | 16 | 6 | | – | 2 | 1 | | | 3 | | | | | no change | |
| Belfast North | 17 | 5 | | – | 2 | 1 | | | 2 | | | | | 1 seat abolished | DUP |
| Belfast North | 22 | 5 | – | – | 2 | – | 1 | – | 2 | | | | – | Alliance | SDLP |
| Belfast West | 73 | 6 | | – | – | 2 | 1 | 1 | | | 1 | | 1 | new constituency | |
| Belfast West | 75 | 6 | | – | – | 2 | 1 | 2 | | | – | | 1 | UUP | VUPP |
| Belfast West | 82 | 4 | | – | 1 | 1 | 1 | 1 | | | – | | | Sinn Féin | SDLP |
| Belfast West | 82 | 4 | | – | 1 | 1 | 1 | 1 | | | – | | | 2 seats abolished | UUP |
| Belfast West | 82 | 4 | | – | 1 | 1 | 1 | 1 | | | – | | | 2 seats abolished | Ind U |
| Belfast West | 96 | 5 | | – | 4 | 1 | | | | | – | | | Sinn Féin | Alliance |
| Belfast West | 96 | 5 | | – | 4 | 1 | | | | | – | | | Sinn Féin | UUP |
| Belfast West | 96 | 5 | | – | 4 | 1 | | | | | – | | | Sinn Féin | 1 new seat |
| Belfast West | 98 | 6 | | – | 4 | 2 | | | | | – | | | SDLP | 1 new seat |
| Belfast West | 03 | 6 | | – | 4 | 1 | | | 1 | | – | | | DUP | SDLP |
| Belfast West | 07 | 6 | | – | 5 | 1 | | | | | – | | | Sinn Féin | DUP |
| Belfast West | 11 | 6 | | – | 5 | 1 | | | | | – | | | no change | |
| Belfast West | 16 | 6 | 1 | – | 4 | 1 | | | | | – | | | PBP | Sinn Féin |
| Belfast West | 17 | 5 | 1 | – | 4 | – | | | | | – | | | 1 seat abolished | SDLP |
| Belfast West | 22 | 5 | 1 | – | 4 | – | – | – | – | | – | | – | no change | |
| Belfast South | 73 | 6 | | – | | | 1 | 4 | 1 | | – | | | new constituency | |
| Belfast South | 75 | 6 | | – | | | 2 | 2 | 1 | | 1 | | | Alliance | UUP |
| Belfast South | 75 | 6 | | – | | | 2 | 2 | 1 | | 1 | | | VUPP | UUP |
| Belfast South | 82 | 5 | | – | | | 1 | 3 | 1 | | – | | | UUP | VUPP |
| Belfast South | 82 | 5 | | – | | | 1 | 3 | 1 | | – | | | 1 seat abolished | Alliance |
| Belfast South | 96 | 5 | | – | | 1 | 1 | 2 | 1 | | – | | | SDLP | UUP |
| Belfast South | 98 | 6 | | 1 | | 2 | | 2 | 1 | | – | | | NIWC | Alliance |
| Belfast South | 03 | 6 | | – | 1 | 2 | | 2 | 1 | | – | | | Sinn Féin | NIWC |
| Belfast South | 07 | 6 | | – | 1 | 2 | 1 | 1 | 1 | | – | | | Alliance | UUP |
| Belfast South | 11 | 6 | | – | 1 | 2 | 1 | 1 | 1 | | – | | | no change | |
| Belfast South | 16 | 6 | | 1 | 1 | 1 | 1 | – | 2 | | – | | | Green | SDLP |
| Belfast South | 16 | 6 | | 1 | 1 | 1 | 1 | – | 2 | | – | | | DUP | UUP |
| Belfast South | 17 | 5 | | 1 | 1 | 1 | 1 | – | 1 | | – | | | 1 seat abolished | DUP |
| Belfast South | 22 | 5 | – | 1 | 1 | 1 | 2 | – | 1 | | – | | – | Alliance | Green |
| Belfast East | 73 | 6 | | 1 | | | 1 | 3 | 1 | | – | | | new constituency | |
| Belfast East | 75 | 6 | | 1 | | | 1 | – | 1 | | 2 | 1 | | VUPP | UUP |
| Belfast East | 75 | 6 | | 1 | | | 1 | – | 1 | | 2 | 1 | | UPNI | UUP |
| Belfast East | 82 | 6 | | – | | | 2 | 2 | 2 | | – | | | Alliance | Labour |
| Belfast East | 82 | 6 | | – | | | 2 | 2 | 2 | | – | | | UUP | UPNI |
| Belfast East | 82 | 6 | | – | | | 2 | 2 | 2 | | – | | | UUP | VUPP |
| Belfast East | 82 | 6 | | – | | | 2 | 2 | 2 | | – | | | DUP | VUPP |
| Belfast East | 96 | 5 | | – | | | 1 | 2 | 2 | | – | | | 1 seat abolished | Alliance |
| Belfast East | 98 | 6 | | – | | | 1 | 2 | 2 | | 1 | | | PUP | 1 new seat |
| Belfast East | 03 | 6 | | – | | | 1 | 2 | 2 | | 1 | | | no change | |
| Belfast East | 07 | 6 | | – | | | 1 | 1 | 3 | | 1 | | | DUP | UUP |
| Belfast East | 11 | 6 | | – | | | 2 | 1 | 3 | | – | | | Alliance | PUP |
| Belfast East | 16 | 6 | | – | | | 2 | 1 | 3 | | – | | | no change | |
| Belfast East | 17 | 5 | | – | | | 2 | 1 | 2 | | – | | | 1 seat abolished | DUP |
| Belfast East | 22 | 5 | – | – | – | – | 2 | 1 | 2 | | – | | – | no change | |
| North Down | 73 | 7 | | – | | | 2 | 4 | 1 | | – | | | new constituency | |
| North Down | 75 | 7 | | – | | | 2 | 2 | 1 | | 1 | 1 | | VUPP | UUP |
| North Down | 75 | 7 | | – | | | 2 | 2 | 1 | | 1 | 1 | | UPNI | UUP |
| North Down | 82 | 8 | | – | | | 2 | 3 | 2 | | – | 1 | | DUP | 1 new seat |
| North Down | 82 | 8 | | – | | | 2 | 3 | 2 | | – | 1 | | UUP | VUPP |
| North Down | 82 | 8 | | – | | | 2 | 3 | 2 | | – | 1 | | UPUP | UPNI |
| North Down | 96 | 5 | | – | | | 1 | 2 | 1 | 1 | – | | | UKUP | DUP |
| North Down | 96 | 5 | | – | | | 1 | 2 | 1 | 1 | – | | | 3 seats abolished | Alliance |
| North Down | 96 | 5 | | – | | | 1 | 2 | 1 | 1 | – | | | 3 seats abolished | UUP |
| North Down | 96 | 5 | | – | | | 1 | 2 | 1 | 1 | – | | | 3 seats abolished | UPUP |
| North Down | 98 | 6 | | 1 | | | 1 | 3 | | 1 | – | | | NIWC | 1 new seat |
| North Down | 98 | 6 | | 1 | | | 1 | 3 | | 1 | – | | | UUP | DUP |
| North Down | 03 | 6 | | – | | | 1 | 2 | 2 | 1 | – | | | DUP | WC |
| North Down | 03 | 6 | | – | | | 1 | 2 | 2 | 1 | – | | | DUP | UUP |
| North Down | 07 | 6 | | 1 | | | 1 | 2 | 2 | | – | | | Green | UKUP |
| North Down | 11 | 6 | | 1 | | | 1 | 1 | 3 | | – | | | DUP | UUP |
| North Down | 16 | 6 | | 1 | | | 1 | 1 | 3 | | – | | | no change | |
| North Down | 17 | 5 | | 1 | | | 1 | 1 | 2 | | – | | | 1 seat abolished | DUP |
| North Down | 22 | 5 | – | – | – | – | 2 | 1 | 1 | | – | | 1 | Ind. U. | DUP |
| North Down | 22 | 5 | – | – | – | – | 2 | 1 | 1 | | – | | 1 | Alliance | Green |
| Strangford | 73 | part of North Down, Belfast East and Belfast South prior to 1996 | | | | | | | | | | | | | |
| Strangford | 75 | part of North Down, Belfast East and Belfast South prior to 1996 | | | | | | | | | | | | | |
| Strangford | 82 | part of North Down, Belfast East and Belfast South prior to 1996 | | | | | | | | | | | | | |
| Strangford | 96 | 5 | | – | | | 1 | 2 | 2 | – | – | | | new constituency | |
| Strangford | 98 | 6 | | – | | | 1 | 2 | 2 | 1 | – | | | UKUP | 1 new seat |
| Strangford | 03 | 6 | | – | | | 1 | 2 | 3 | | – | | | DUP | UKUP |
| Strangford | 07 | 6 | | – | | | 1 | 1 | 4 | | – | | | DUP | UUP |
| Strangford | 11 | 6 | | – | | | 1 | 2 | 3 | | – | | | UUP | DUP |
| Strangford | 16 | 6 | | – | | | 1 | 2 | 3 | | – | | | no change | |
| Strangford | 17 | 5 | | – | | | 1 | 1 | 3 | | – | | | 1 seat abolished | UUP |
| Strangford | 22 | 5 | – | – | – | – | 2 | 1 | 2 | | – | | – | Alliance | DUP |
| Lagan Valley | 73 | part of South Antrim and North Down prior to 1996 | | | | | | | | | | | | | |
| Lagan Valley | 75 | part of South Antrim and North Down prior to 1996 | | | | | | | | | | | | | |
| Lagan Valley | 82 | part of South Antrim and North Down prior to 1996 | | | | | | | | | | | | | |
| Lagan Valley | 96 | 5 | | – | | – | – | 3 | 2 | | – | | | new constituency | |
| Lagan Valley | 98 | 6 | | – | | 1 | 1 | 2 | 1 | 1 | – | | | Sinn Féin | 1 new seat |
| Lagan Valley | 98 | 6 | | – | | 1 | 1 | 2 | 1 | 1 | – | | | Alliance | UUP |
| Lagan Valley | 98 | 6 | | – | | 1 | 1 | 2 | 1 | 1 | – | | | UKUP | DUP |
| Lagan Valley | 03 | 6 | | – | | 1 | 1 | 3 | 1 | | – | | | UUP | UKUP |
| Lagan Valley | 07 | 6 | | – | 1 | | 1 | 1 | 3 | | – | | | Sinn Féin | SDLP |
| Lagan Valley | 07 | 6 | | – | 1 | | 1 | 1 | 3 | | – | | | DUP | UUP |
| Lagan Valley | 07 | 6 | | – | 1 | | 1 | 1 | 3 | | – | | | DUP | UUP |
| Lagan Valley | 11 | 6 | | – | | | 1 | 1 | 4 | | – | | | DUP | Sinn Féin |
| Lagan Valley | 16 | 6 | | – | | | 1 | 2 | 3 | | – | | | UUP | DUP |
| Lagan Valley | 17 | 5 | | – | | 1 | 1 | 1 | 2 | | – | | | SDLP | UUP |
| Lagan Valley | 17 | 5 | | – | | 1 | 1 | 1 | 2 | | – | | | 1 seat abolished | DUP |
| Lagan Valley | 22 | 5 | – | – | – | – | 2 | 1 | 2 | | – | | – | Alliance | SDLP |
| Upper Bann | 73 | part of Armagh, South Down and South Antrim prior to 1996 | | | | | | | | | | | | | |
| Upper Bann | 75 | part of Armagh, South Down and South Antrim prior to 1996 | | | | | | | | | | | | | |
| Upper Bann | 82 | part of Armagh, South Down and South Antrim prior to 1996 | | | | | | | | | | | | | |
| Upper Bann | 96 | 5 | | – | 1 | 1 | | 2 | 1 | | – | | | new constituency | |
| Upper Bann | 98 | 6 | | – | 1 | 1 | | 2 | 1 | | – | | 1 | Ind U | 1 new seat |
| Upper Bann | 03 | 6 | | – | 1 | 1 | | 2 | 2 | | – | | | DUP | Ind U |
| Upper Bann | 07 | 6 | | – | 1 | 1 | | 2 | 2 | | – | | | no change | |
| Upper Bann | 11 | 6 | | – | 1 | 1 | | 2 | 2 | | – | | | no change | |
| Upper Bann | 16 | 6 | | – | 2 | | | 2 | 2 | | – | | | Sinn Féin | SDLP |
| Upper Bann | 17 | 5 | | – | 1 | 1 | | 1 | 2 | | – | | | SDLP | Sinn Féin |
| Upper Bann | 17 | 5 | | – | 1 | 1 | | 1 | 2 | | – | | | 1 seat abolished | UUP |
| Upper Bann | 22 | 5 | – | – | 1 | – | 1 | 1 | 2 | | – | | – | Alliance | SDLP |
| South Down | 73 | 7 | | – | | 3 | | 3 | | | 1 | | | new constituency | |
| South Down | 75 | 7 | | – | | 3 | | 2 | | | 1 | 1 | | UPNI | UUP |
| South Down | 82 | 7 | | – | | 3 | | 2 | 2 | | – | | | DUP | VUPP |
| South Down | 82 | 7 | | – | | 3 | | 2 | 2 | | – | | | DUP | UPNI |
| South Down | 96 | 5 | | – | 1 | 3 | | 1 | | | – | | | Sinn Féin | UUP |
| South Down | 96 | 5 | | – | 1 | 3 | | 1 | | | – | | | 2 seats abolished | DUP |
| South Down | 96 | 5 | | – | 1 | 3 | | 1 | | | – | | | 2 seats abolished | DUP |
| South Down | 98 | 6 | | – | 1 | 3 | | 1 | 1 | | – | | | DUP | 1 new seat |
| South Down | 03 | 6 | | – | 2 | 2 | | 1 | 1 | | – | | | Sinn Féin | SDLP |
| South Down | 07 | 6 | | – | 2 | 2 | | 1 | 1 | | – | | | no change | |
| South Down | 11 | 6 | | – | 2 | 2 | | 1 | 1 | | – | | | no change | |
| South Down | 16 | 6 | | – | 2 | 2 | | 1 | 1 | | – | | | no change | |
| South Down | 17 | 5 | | – | 2 | 2 | | | 1 | | – | | | 1 seat abolished | UUP |
| South Down | 22 | 5 | – | – | 2 | 1 | 1 | – | 1 | | – | | – | Alliance | SDLP |
| Newry and Armagh | 73 | part of Armagh and South Down prior to 1996 | | | | | | | | | | | | | |
| Newry and Armagh | 75 | part of Armagh and South Down prior to 1996 | | | | | | | | | | | | | |
| Newry and Armagh | 82 | part of Armagh and South Down prior to 1996 | | | | | | | | | | | | | |
| Newry and Armagh | 96 | 5 | | – | 2 | 2 | | 1 | | | – | | | new constituency | |
| Newry and Armagh | 98 | 6 | | – | 2 | 2 | | 1 | 1 | | – | | | DUP | 1 new seat |
| Newry and Armagh | 03 | 6 | | – | 3 | 1 | | 1 | 1 | | – | | | no change | |
| Newry and Armagh | 07 | 6 | | – | 3 | 1 | | 1 | 1 | | – | | | no change | |
| Newry and Armagh | 11 | 6 | | – | 3 | 1 | | 1 | 1 | | – | | | no change | |
| Newry and Armagh | 16 | 6 | | – | 3 | 1 | | 1 | 1 | | – | | | no change | |
| Newry and Armagh | 17 | 5 | | – | 3 | 1 | | | 1 | | – | | | 1 seat abolished | UUP |
| Newry and Armagh | 22 | 5 | – | – | 3 | 1 | – | – | 1 | | – | | – | – | – |
| Fermanagh & South Tyrone | 73 | 5 | | – | | 2 | | 2 | | | 1 | | | new constituency | |
| Fermanagh & South Tyrone | 75 | 5 | | – | | 2 | | 2 | | | 1 | | | no change | |
| Fermanagh & South Tyrone | 82 | 5 | | – | 1 | 1 | | 2 | 1 | | – | | | Sinn Féin | SDLP |
| Fermanagh & South Tyrone | 82 | 5 | | – | 1 | 1 | | 2 | 1 | | – | | | DUP | VUPP |
| Fermanagh & South Tyrone | 96 | 5 | | – | 1 | 1 | | 2 | 1 | | – | | | no change | |
| Fermanagh & South Tyrone | 98 | 6 | | – | 2 | 1 | | 2 | 1 | | – | | | Sinn Féin | 1 new seat |
| Fermanagh & South Tyrone | 03 | 6 | | – | 2 | 1 | | 2 | 1 | | – | | | no change | |
| Fermanagh & South Tyrone | 07 | 6 | | – | 2 | 1 | | 1 | 2 | | – | | | DUP | UUP |
| Fermanagh & South Tyrone | 11 | 6 | | – | 3 | – | | 1 | 2 | | – | | | Sinn Féin | SDLP |
| Fermanagh & South Tyrone | 16 | 6 | | – | 2 | 1 | | 1 | 2 | | – | | | SDLP | Sinn Féin |
| Fermanagh & South Tyrone | 17 | 5 | | – | 3 | – | | 1 | 1 | | – | | | Sinn Féin | SDLP |
| Fermanagh & South Tyrone | 17 | 5 | | – | 3 | – | | 1 | 1 | | – | | | 1 seat abolished | DUP |
| Fermanagh & South Tyrone | 22 | 5 | – | – | 3 | – | – | 1 | 1 | | – | | – | no change | |
| West Tyrone | 73 | part of Mid Ulster and Fermanagh and South Tyrone prior to 1996 | | | | | | | | | | | | | |
| West Tyrone | 75 | part of Mid Ulster and Fermanagh and South Tyrone prior to 1996 | | | | | | | | | | | | | |
| West Tyrone | 82 | part of Mid Ulster and Fermanagh and South Tyrone prior to 1996 | | | | | | | | | | | | | |
| West Tyrone | 96 | 5 | | – | 1 | 2 | | 1 | 1 | | – | | | new constituency | |
| West Tyrone | 98 | 6 | | – | 2 | 2 | | 1 | 1 | | – | | | Sinn Féin | 1 new seat |
| West Tyrone | 03 | 6 | | – | 2 | 1 | | 1 | 1 | | – | | 1 | Ind Other | SDLP |
| West Tyrone | 07 | 6 | | – | 3 | – | | – | 2 | | – | | 1 | Sinn Féin | SDLP |
| West Tyrone | 11 | 6 | | – | 3 | 1 | | 1 | 1 | | – | | | UUP | DUP |
| West Tyrone | 16 | 6 | | – | 3 | 1 | | 1 | 1 | | – | | | no change | |
| West Tyrone | 17 | 5 | | – | 3 | 1 | | | 1 | | – | | | 1 seat abolished | UUP |
| West Tyrone | 22 | 5 | – | – | 3 | 1 | – | – | 1 | | – | | – | no change | |
| Mid Ulster | 73 | 6 | | – | – | 3 | | 2 | – | | 1 | | | new constituency | |
| Mid Ulster | 75 | 6 | | – | – | 2 | | 2 | 1 | | 1 | | | DUP | SDLP |
| Mid Ulster | 82 | 6 | | – | 1 | 2 | | 1 | 2 | | – | | | Sinn Féin | UUP |
| Mid Ulster | 82 | 6 | | – | 1 | 2 | | 1 | 2 | | – | | | DUP | VUPP |
| Mid Ulster | 96 | 5 | | – | 2 | 1 | | 1 | 1 | | – | | | Sinn Féin | SDLP |
| Mid Ulster | 96 | 5 | | – | 2 | 1 | | 1 | 1 | | – | | | 1 seat abolishd | DUP |
| Mid Ulster | 98 | 6 | | – | 3 | 1 | | 1 | 1 | | – | | | Sinn Féin | 1 new seat |
| Mid Ulster | 03 | 6 | | – | 3 | 1 | | 1 | 1 | | – | | | no change | |
| Mid Ulster | 07 | 6 | | – | 3 | 1 | | 1 | 1 | | – | | | no change | |
| Mid Ulster | 11 | 6 | | – | 3 | 1 | | 1 | 1 | | – | | | no change | |
| Mid Ulster | 16 | 6 | | – | 3 | 1 | | 1 | 1 | | – | | | no change | |
| Mid Ulster | 17 | 5 | | – | 3 | 1 | | | 1 | | – | | | 1 seat abolished | UUP |
| Mid Ulster | 22 | 5 | – | – | 3 | 1 | – | – | 1 | | – | | – | no change | |
| Foyle | 73 | part of Londonderry constituency prior to 1996 | | | | | | | | | | | | | |
| Foyle | 75 | part of Londonderry constituency prior to 1996 | | | | | | | | | | | | | |
| Foyle | 82 | part of Londonderry constituency prior to 1996 | | | | | | | | | | | | | |
| Foyle | 96 | 5 | | – | 2 | 3 | | | | | – | | | new constituency | |
| Foyle | 98 | 6 | | – | 2 | 3 | | | 1 | | – | | | DUP | 1 new seat |
| Foyle | 03 | 6 | | – | 2 | 3 | | | 1 | | – | | | no change | |
| Foyle | 07 | 6 | | – | 2 | 3 | | | 1 | | – | | | no change | |
| Foyle | 11 | 6 | | – | 2 | 3 | | | 1 | | – | | | no change | |
| Foyle | 16 | 6 | 1 | – | 2 | 2 | | | 1 | | – | | | PBP | SDLP |
| Foyle | 17 | 5 | | – | 2 | 2 | | | 1 | | – | | | 1 seat abolished | PBP |
| Foyle | 22 | 5 | – | – | 2 | 2 | – | – | 1 | | – | | – | no change | |
| East Londonderry | 73 | part of Londonderry constituency and North Antrim prior to 1996 | | | | | | | | | | | | | |
| East Londonderry | 75 | part of Londonderry constituency and North Antrim prior to 1996 | | | | | | | | | | | | | |
| East Londonderry | 82 | part of Londonderry constituency and North Antrim prior to 1996 | | | | | | | | | | | | | |
| East Londonderry | 96 | 5 | | – | – | 1 | | 2 | 2 | | – | | | new constituency | |
| East Londonderry | 98 | 6 | | – | – | 2 | | 2 | 1 | | – | | 1 | Ind U | DUP |
| East Londonderry | 98 | 6 | | – | – | 2 | | 2 | 1 | | – | | 1 | SDLP | 1 new seat |
| East Londonderry | 03 | 6 | | – | 1 | 1 | | 2 | 2 | | – | | | DUP | Ind U |
| East Londonderry | 03 | 6 | | – | 1 | 1 | | 2 | 2 | | – | | | Sinn Féin | SDLP |
| East Londonderry | 07 | 6 | | – | 1 | 1 | | 1 | 3 | | – | | | DUP | UUP |
| East Londonderry | 11 | 6 | | – | 1 | 1 | | | 3 | | – | | 1 | Ind U | UUP |
| East Londonderry | 16 | 6 | | – | 1 | 1 | | | 3 | | – | | 1 | no change | |
| East Londonderry | 17 | 5 | | – | 1 | 1 | | | 2 | | – | | 1 | 1 seat abolished | DUP |
| East Londonderry | 22 | 5 | – | – | 1 | 1 | – | – | 2 | | – | | 1 | no change | |
| Forum top-up seats (1996) | 96 | 10 | | 4 (Note: Including 2 top-up seats each for the Northern Ireland Women's Coalition and the Labour coalition.) | 2 | 2 | 2 | 2 | 2 | 2 | 4 (Note: Including 2 seats each for the PUP and UDP.) | | | one-off non-territorial constituency | |
| Total | | 90 | 1 | 0 | 27 | 8 | 17 | 9 | 25 | 1 | | | 2 | | |
| Change since 2017 (after 2022 election) | | – | – | –2 | – | –4 | +9 | –1 | −3 | – | – | – | +1 | – | – |
| | | Total | | | | | | | | | | | | Gained by | Formerly held by |
| | | Total | PBP | GP/WC/ Lab (Note: The Green Party, Northern Ireland Women's Coalition and Northern Ireland Labour Party were separate parties who each had a raison d'étre that was not focused on the constitutional question (women's interests, green politics and trade union interests, respectively). Since 1973, the parties only ever won constituency seats in Belfast South, Belfast East and North Down. Except for the 1996 Forum, when Labour and the Women's Coalition both had 2 top-up seats each, the parties have never had elected representation simultaneously. In territorial constituencies, seats under the GP/WC/Lab heading prior to 2003 belonged to the Women's Coalition, and after 2003 belonged to the Greens.) | Sinn Féin | SDLP | APNI | UUP | DUP | TUV/ UKUP (Note: The TUV and UKUP were separate conservative unionist parties that asserted support for the rule of law. The two parties never held elected representation in Northern Ireland simultaneously. Seats under the TUV/UKUP heading prior to 2007 belonged to UKUP, and after 2007 belonged to TUV.) | PUP/UDP/ VUPP (Note: The PUP, UDP and VUPP were separate paramilitary-linked unionist parties. Except for the 1996 Forum, when the PUP and UDP had 2 top-up seats each, the parties never had elected representation in Northern Ireland simultaneously. Seats under the PUP/VUPP/UDP heading prior to 1982 belonged to the VUPP, and after 1982 belonged to the PUP.) | UPUP/UPNI (Note: The Unionist Party of Northern Ireland and the Ulster Popular Unionist Party were separate pro-devolution unionist parties. The two parties did not hold seats in a Northern Ireland devolved legislature simultaneously. Seats under the UPUP/UPNI heading prior to 1982 belonged to the UPNI, and from 1982 onwards belonged to the UPUP.) | Ind. | Gained by | Formerly held by |
| Elected on 2 March 2017 | | 90 | 1 (▼1) | 2 | 27 (▼1) | 12 | 8 | 10 (▼6) | 28 (▼10) | 1 | | | 1 | – | – |
| Elected on 5 May 2016 | | 108 | 2 (▲2) | 2 (▲1) | 28 (▼1) | 12 (▼2) | 8 | 16 | 38 | 1 | | | 1 | – | – |
| Elected on 5 May 2011 | | 108 | 0 | 1 | 29 (▲1) | 14 (▼2) | 8 (▲1) | 16 (▼2) | 38 (▲2) | 1 (▲1) | 0 (▼1) | | 1 | – | – |
| Elected on 7 March 2007 | | 108 | – | 1 (▲1) | 28 (▲4) | 16 (▼2) | 7 (▲1) | 18 (▼9) | 36 (▲6) | – | 1 | – | 1 | – | – |
| Elected on 23 November 2003 | | 108 | – | – | 24 (▲6) | 18 (▼6) | 6 | 27 (▼1) | 30 (▲10) | 1 (▼4) | 1 (▼1) | – | 1 (▼1) | – | – |
| Elected on 25 June 1998 | | 108 | – | 2 (▼2) | 18 (▲1) | 24 (▲3) | 6 (▼1) | 28 (▼2) | 20 (▼4) | 5 (▲2) | 2 (▼2) | – | 4 (▲3) | – | – |
| Elected on 30 May 1996 | | 110 | – | 4 (▲4) | 17 (▲12) | 21 (▲7) | 7 (▼3) | 30 (▲4) | 24 (▲3) | 3 (▲3) | 4 (▲4) | – | | – | – |
| Elected on 20 October 1982 | | 78 | | | 5 (▲5) | 14 (▼3) | 10 (▲2) | 26 (▲7) | 21 (▲9) | | | 1 (▼4) | 2 | – | – |
| Elected on 1 May 1975 | | 78 | | 1 | | 17 (▼2) | 8 | 19 (▼12) | 12 (▲3) | | 14 (▲6) | 5 (▲5) | 2 | – | – |
| Elected on 28 June 1973 | | 78 | | 1 | | 19 | 8 | 31 | 9 | | 8 | | 2 | – | – |

=== Co-options ===
Vacancies between Assembly elections are filled by co-option. A by-election is still available as an option if the nominated person cannot take their seat but none have been held.

The possibility of by-elections or co-options was established by the Northern Ireland Act 1998. In 2001, the Northern Ireland Office introduced a system of substitutes as the preferred option. Under a further change made in 2009, a political party leader directly nominates a new MLA if their party won that seat at the previous election. Independent MLAs can continue to use substitutes.

When Sinn Féin MLA Michael Ferguson died in September 2006, no substitutes were available. Sinn Féin was allowed to use his vote in the Assembly (despite his death) and no by-election was held. His seat remained vacant until the 2007 Northern Ireland Assembly election.

Dáil Éireann, the lower house of the Oireachtas (Irish Parliament), uses the same single transferable vote system for elections as the Assembly but does allow by-elections to fill vacancies. This method is also used for the seats chosen by election in the upper house, Seanad Éireann.

== Organisation ==
The Assembly is chaired by the speaker and three deputy speakers, of whom one is appointed Principal Deputy Speaker. Lord Alderdice served as the first speaker of the Assembly from July 1998, but retired in March 2004 to serve as a member of the Independent Monitoring Commission that supervised paramilitary ceasefires. The position is currently held by the Democratic Unionist Party MLA Edwin Poots. In the Assembly, the speaker and ten other members constitute a quorum.

The Assembly Commission is the body corporate of the Assembly with all that entails. It looks after the pay and pensions of members directly and through tax-payer funded appointees, and the interests of political parties. The very first bill of the Assembly was to do with members' pensions and was taken through with minimum ado by a member of the commission.

The Assembly has 9 statutory committees, each of which is charged with scrutinising the activities of a single ministerial department. It also has 6 permanent standing committees and can establish temporary ad hoc committees. The chairmen and deputy chairmen of the committees are chosen by party nominating officers under the d'Hondt system procedure, used to appoint most ministers. Ordinary committee members are not appointed under this procedure but the Standing Orders require that the share of members of each party on a committee should be roughly proportionate to its share of seats in the Assembly. Committees of the Assembly take decisions by a simple majority vote. The following are the current statutory and standing committees of the Assembly:

=== Statutory (departmental) committees ===
- Executive Office Committee
- Agriculture, Environment and Rural Affairs Committee
- Communities Committee
- Economy Committee
- Education Committee
- Finance Committee
- Health Committee
- Infrastructure Committee
- Justice Committee

=== Standing committees ===
- Assembly and Executive Review Committee
- Audit Committee
- Business Committee
- Procedures Committee
- Public Accounts Committee
- Standards and Privileges Committee
- Windsor Framework Democratic Scrutiny Committee

== See also ==
- Member of the Legislative Assembly (Northern Ireland)
- List of political parties in Northern Ireland
- 2022 Northern Ireland Assembly election
- Members of the 7th Northern Ireland Assembly
- Scottish Parliament
- Senedd
- Oireachtas
