= Next Northern Ireland Assembly election =

Upcoming election for Northern Ireland

- No later than 6 May 2027

All 90 seats to the Northern Ireland Assembly
- Opinion polls
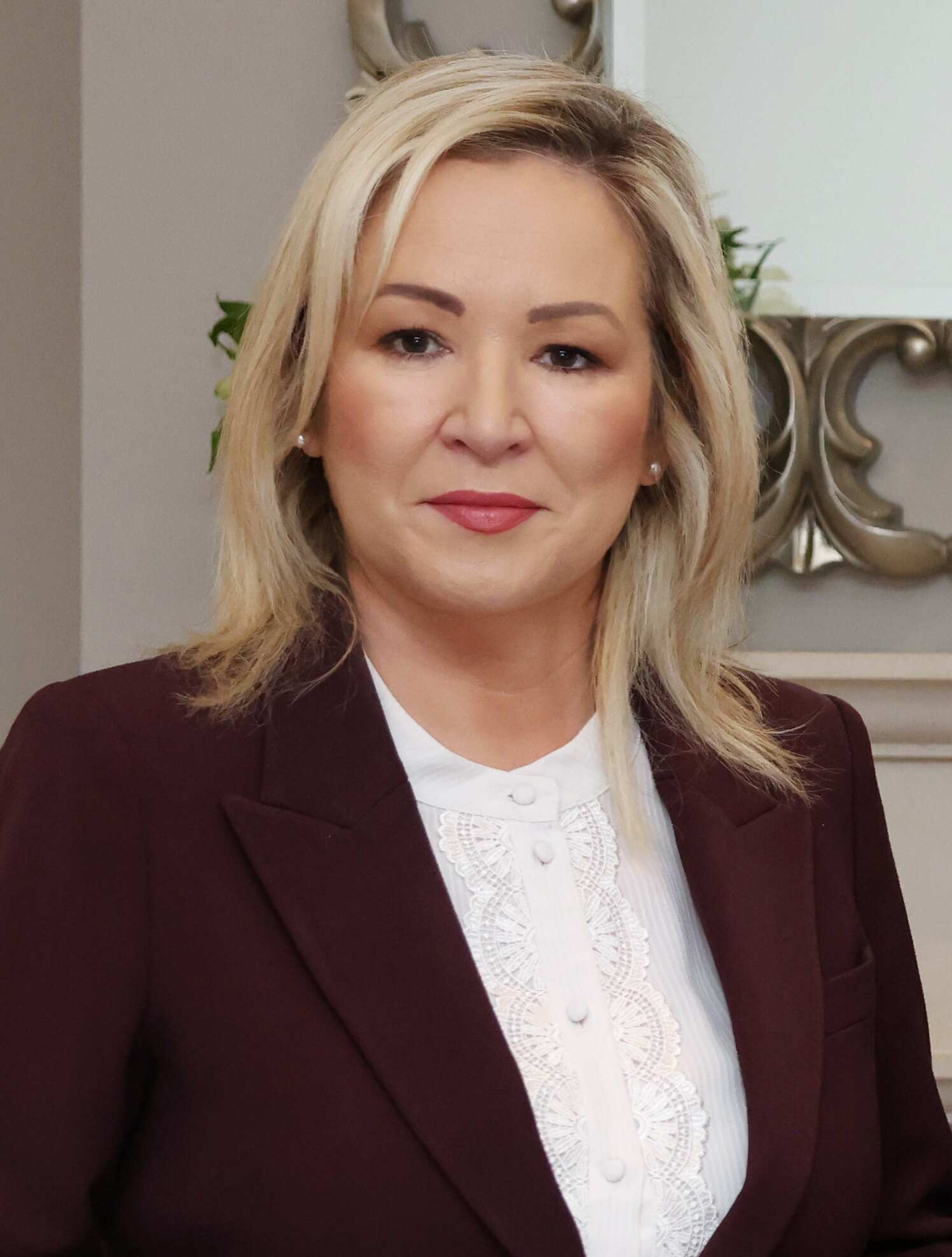

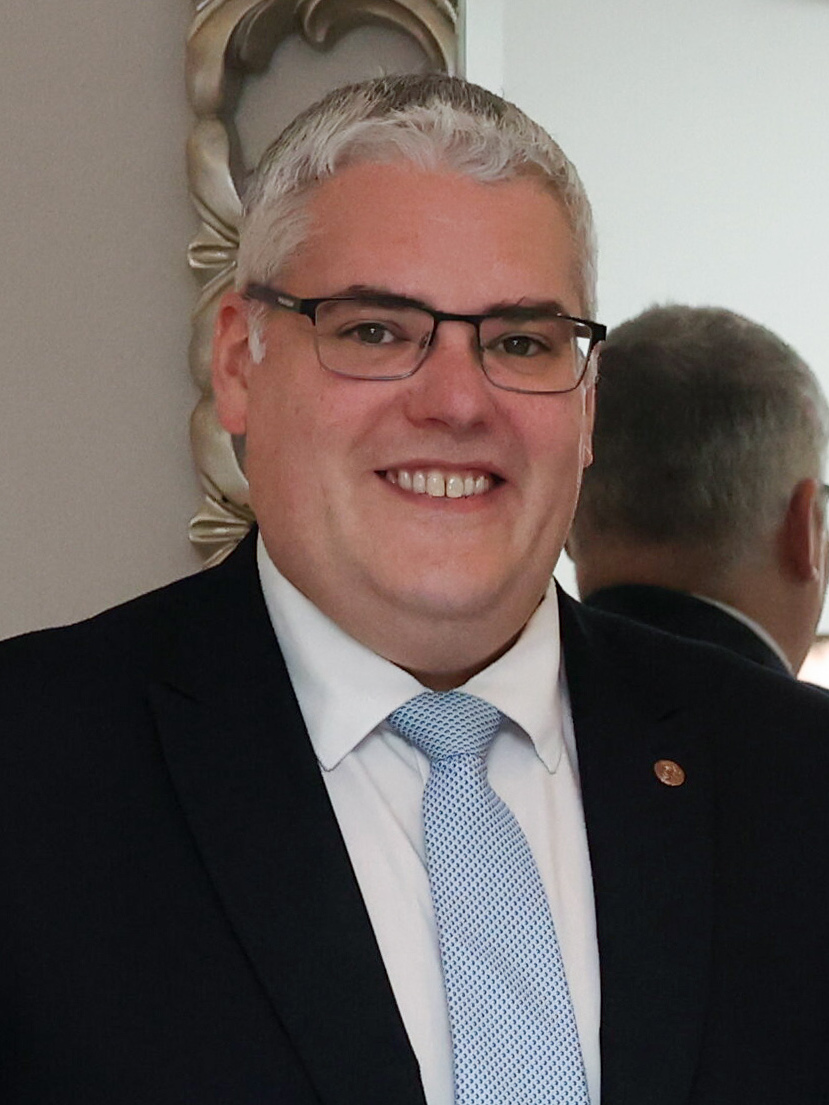

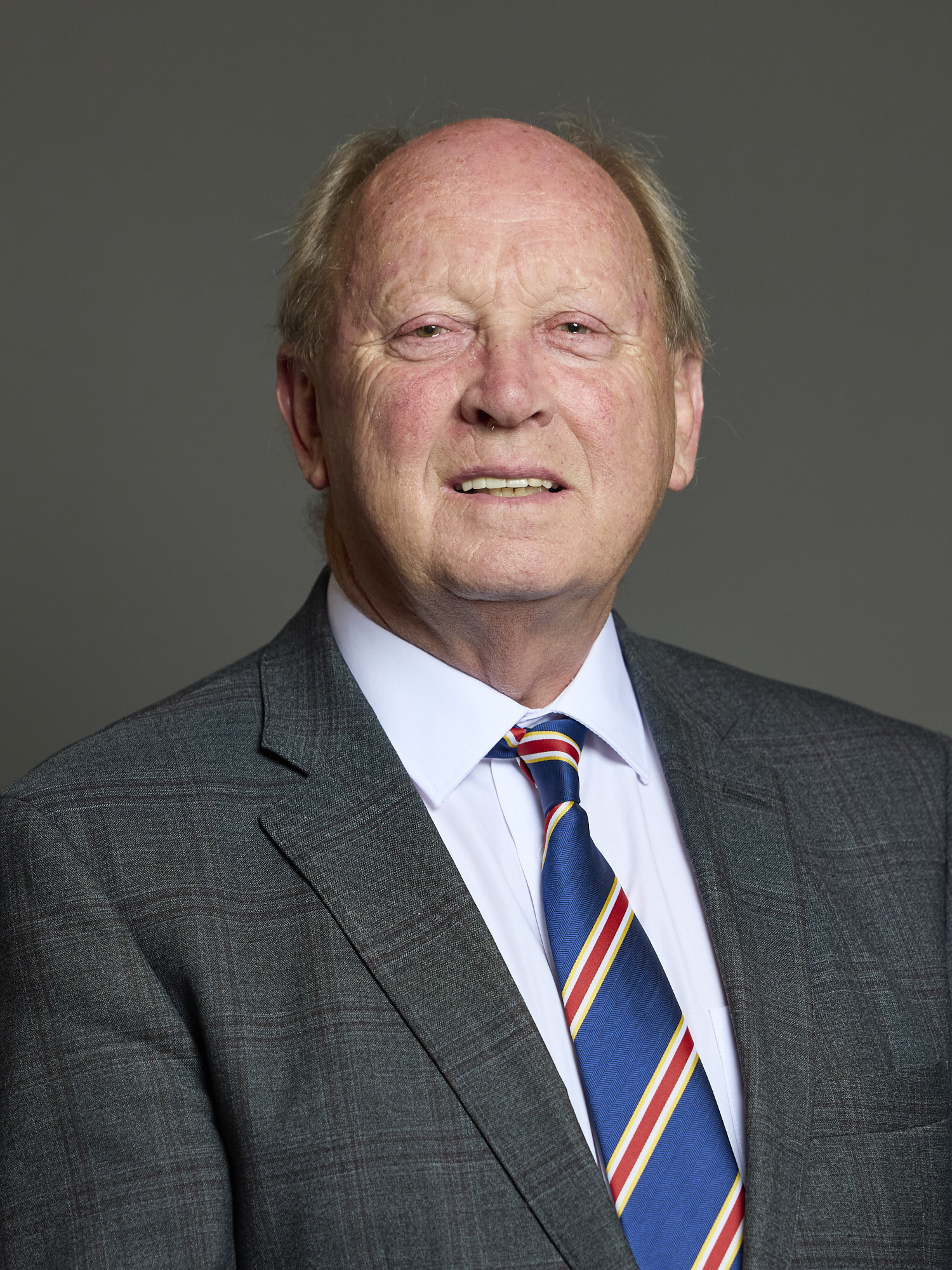

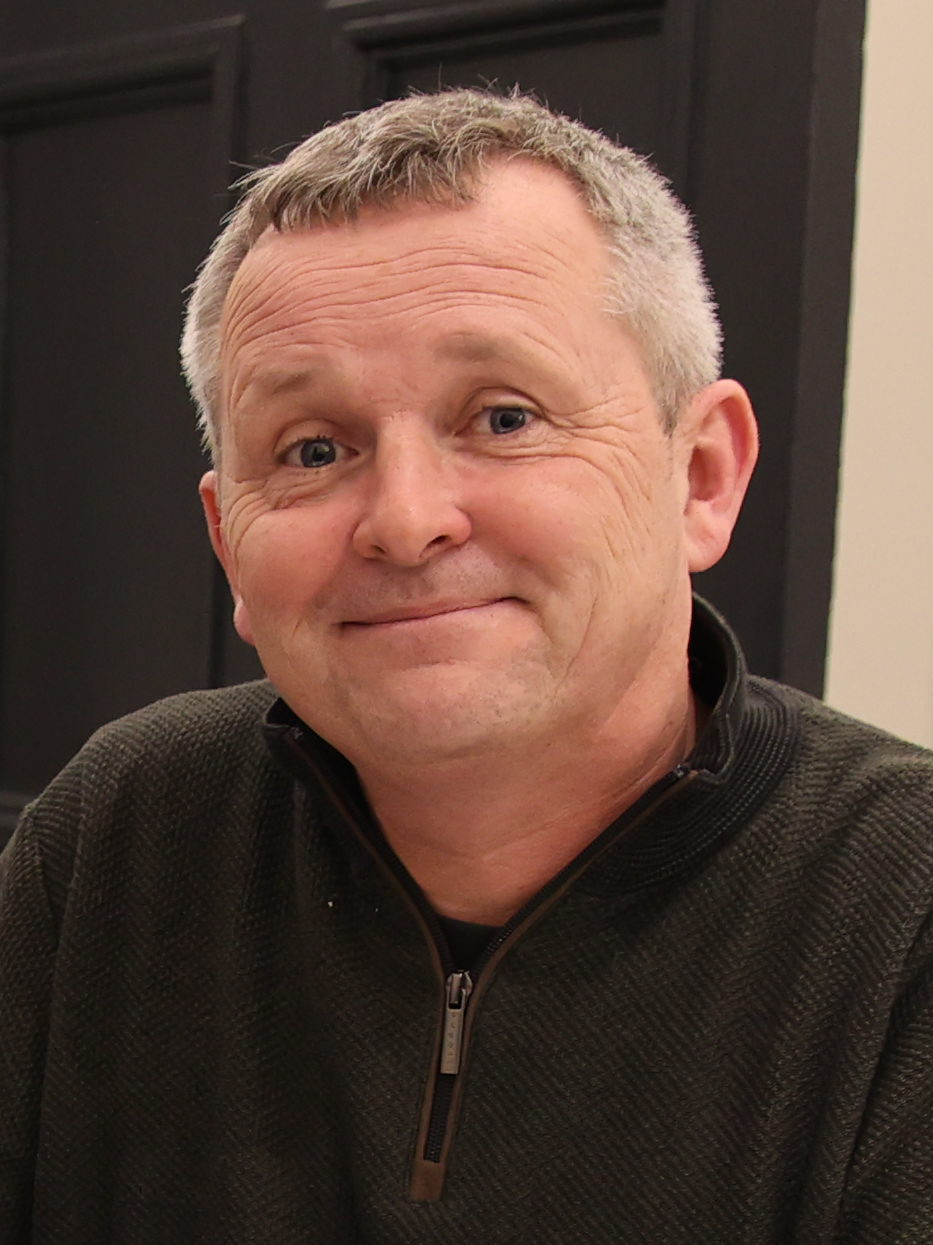
Leader	Michelle O'Neill (Note: Sinn Féin's president is Mary Lou McDonald, who is a TD for Dublin Central in Dáil Éireann, the lower house of the Oireachtas (legislature of the Republic of Ireland). O'Neill is the party's vice president and leads the party in Northern Ireland.)	Gavin Robinson (Note: DUP Deputy Leader Michelle McIlveen leads the party in the Northern Ireland Assembly. The DUP's Emma Little-Pengelly serves as Deputy First Minister of Northern Ireland.)	Naomi Long
Party	Sinn Féin	DUP	Alliance
Leader since	23 January 2017 (Note: As "Party leader in the North")	29 May 2024	26 October 2016
Leader's seat	Mid Ulster	MP (not an MLA) (Note: Robinson sits in the House of Commons as the MP for Belfast East rather than in the Assembly.)	Belfast East
Last election	27 seats, 29.0%	25 seats, 21.3%	17 seats, 13.5%
Current seats	27	25	17
Leader	Jon Burrows	Claire Hanna	Jim Allister
Party	UUP	SDLP	TUV
Leader since	31 January 2026	5 October 2024	7 December 2007
Leader's seat	North Antrim	MP (not an MLA) (Note: Hanna sits in the House of Commons as the MP for Belfast South and Mid Down rather than in the Assembly. Matthew O'Toole is leader of the SDLP in the Assembly.)	MP (not an MLA) (Note: Allister sits in the House of Commons as the MP for North Antrim rather than in the Assembly. Timothy Gaston is the sole TUV MLA in the Assembly)
Last election	9 seats, 11.2%	8 seats, 9.1%	1 seat, 7.6%
Current seats	8	8	1
Leader	Richard Boyd Barrett
Party	People Before Profit
Leader since	10 October 2024
Leader's seat	TD (not an MLA) (Note: People before Profit's leader is Richard Boyd-Barrett, who is a Teachta Dála for Dún Laoghaire in Dáil Éireann, the lower house of the Oireachtas (the legislature of the Republic of Ireland). Gerry Carroll is the sole People Before Profit MLA in the Assembly)
Last election	1 seat, 1.1%
Current seats	1
Incumbent First Minister and
deputy First Minister
Michelle O'Neill (SF) and
Emma Little-Pengelly (DUP)

A Northern Ireland Assembly election will be held to elect 90 members to the Northern Ireland Assembly on or before 6 May 2027.

After the Northern Ireland Assembly election on 5 May 2022, the DUP (the largest unionist party in the legislature) declined to agree on the appointment of Speaker to the Assembly, preventing the formation of an Executive. Chris Heaton-Harris, the Secretary of State for Northern Ireland, confirmed a legal obligation to call an election if no Executive was formed by a 27 October 2022 deadline.

As no Executive was formed by this deadline, the deadline was extended by legislation in the Westminster Parliament. A deadline of 18 January 2024 was then proposed. On 31 January 2024 the DUP and UK Government announced a deal had been struck to revive the Executive, and on 3 February 2024 the Assembly swore in Sinn Fein First Minister Michelle O'Neill and DUP deputy First Minister Emma Little-Pengelly.

This election will be the eighth since the assembly was established in 1998. Seven parties have MLAs in the seventh assembly: Sinn Féin led by Michelle O'Neill, the Democratic Unionist Party (DUP) led by Gavin Robinson, Alliance led by Naomi Long, the Ulster Unionist Party (UUP) led by Jon Burrows, the Social Democratic and Labour Party (SDLP) led by Claire Hanna, Traditional Unionist Voice (TUV) led by Jim Allister, and People Before Profit (PBP) led by Richard Boyd Barrett.

== Background ==
Section 7 of the Northern Ireland (Miscellaneous Provisions) Act 2014 specifies that elections will be held on the first Thursday in May on the fifth calendar year following that in which its predecessor was elected, which is 6 May 2027; however, there are several circumstances in which the Assembly can be dissolved earlier. After the 2022 Assembly election, the DUP declined to join in forming a government due to its opposition to the Northern Ireland Protocol on post-Brexit trading arrangements. If no government is formed within six months, the United Kingdom Government's Northern Ireland Secretary has to call a new election early or come up with some other solution.

No government was formed by the deadline. Rather than call a new election, Heaton-Harris introduced legislation to extend the deadline, the Northern Ireland (Executive Formation etc) Act 2022. The new deadline also passed with no resolution. Heaton-Harris produced a further extension through legislation via the Northern Ireland (Executive Formation and Organ and Tissue Donation) Act 2023.

On 27 February 2023, the UK and EU announced the Windsor Framework to make changes to the Northern Ireland Protocol. It was hoped that this would lead to formation of an Assembly executive; however, the DUP boycott continued. Heaton-Harris again brought primary legislation to further extend the deadline to 8 February 2024, via the Northern Ireland (Executive Formation) Act 2024. On 30 January, the DUP announced that they would accept a deal, conditional on certain legislation being passed by the UK government, that saw them agreeing to form an executive with Sinn Fein. A new executive was formed on 3 February 2024.

== Candidates ==
- * indicates an incumbent MLA

Constituency	SF	DUP	Alliance	UUP	SDLP	TUV	PBP	Green	Aontú	Independent	Others
Belfast East				Andy Allen*	David McGreevy			Brian Smyth			
Belfast North	Gerry Kelly*; Carál Ní Chuilín*; Maighread Ní Chonghaile				Carl Whyte			Mal O'Hara	Aiden Carlin		
Belfast South and Mid Down	Pat Cullen; Deirdre Hargey*			Kathryn Owen				Áine Groogan			
Belfast West	Danny Baker*; Órlaithí Flynn*; Paul Maskey; Pat Sheehan*	Frank McCoubrey			Gerard McDonald					Paul Doherty	
East Antrim	Ciarán O’Connor		Stewart Dickson*; Danny Donnelly*								
East Londonderry	Caoimhe Archibald*; Kathleen McGurk		Richard Brown-Stewart	Matthew Robinson		Allister Kyle				Claire Sugden*	
Fermanagh and South Tyrone	Jemma Dolan*; Colm Gildernew*; Áine Murphy*										
Foyle	Sandra Duffy; Ciara Ferguson*; Christopher Jackson			Darren Guy					Emmet Doyle		
Lagan Valley	Declan Lynch		Michelle Guy*; David Honeyford*		Rebecca Harper						
Mid Ulster	Linda Dillon*; Ian Milne; Michelle O'Neill*; Emma Sheerin*			Ian Irwin	Malachy Quinn						
Newry and Armagh	Cathal Boylan*; Aoife Finnegan*; Liz Kimmins*			Sam Nicholson	Pete Byrne	Keith Ratcliffe			Roisin Mulgrew		
North Antrim	Philip McGuigan*	Paul Frew*; Darryl Wilson	Sian Mulholland*			Timothy Gaston*; Kirk Wilson					
North Down			Andrew Muir*; Connie Egan*	Pete Wray		Peter Wilson		Anthony Flynn			
South Antrim	Declan Kearney*		John Blair*	Steve Aiken*; Liz Clarke	Linzi McLaren						
South Down	Sinead Ennis*; Cathy Mason*; Michael Rice		Andrew McMurray*			Colin Hillis					
Strangford	Chris Hazzard		Nick Mathison*; Vicky Moore	Richard Smart		Jonathan Jackson				Gareth Burns	
Upper Bann	Catherine Nelson; John O'Dowd*		Eóin Tennyson*	Kyle Savage						Doug Beattie*	
West Tyrone	Órfhlaith Begley; Paul Boggs*; Nicola Brogan*; Declan McAleer*					Stevan Patterson					

== Members not seeking re-election ==
MLA	Constituency	First elected (or co-opted)	Party	Date announced
Mike Nesbitt	Strangford	2011	UUP	2 January 2026
Pádraig Delargy	Foyle	2021 (Elected 2022)	Sinn Féin	13 February 2026
Kellie Armstrong	Strangford	2016	Alliance	24 April 2026
Patsy McGlone	Mid Ulster	2003	SDLP	29 May 2026
Aisling Reilly	Belfast West	2021 (Elected 2022)	Sinn Féin	16 October 2026

Gerry Kelly previously stated that he would stand down as an MLA for North Belfast but announced on 29 October 2026 that he would seek re-election, following discussions with Sinn Féin.

== Opinion polling ==
=== Voting intention ===

Dates conducted	Pollster	Client	Sample size	SF^{N}	DUP ^{U}	APNI ^{O}	UUP ^{U}	SDLP ^{N}	TUV ^{U}	Green ^{O}	Aontú ^{N}	PBP ^{O}	Other	Lead	N	U	O
29–31 Oct 2026	LucidTalk	Belfast Telegraph	3,989	28%	14%	9%	15%	11%	14%	4%	2%	1%	2%	13%	41%	43%	16%
9–28 Oct 2026	More In Common	N/A	1,019	30%	18%	9%	13%	9%	11%	3%	1%	1%	4%	12%	40%	42%	17%
31 Jul – 2 Aug 2026	More In Common	N/A	1,000	25%	17%	11%	13%	9%	12%	4%	1%	2%	5%	8%	35%	42%	22%
17–19 Jul 2026	LucidTalk	Belfast Telegraph	1,050	22%	15%	10%	16%	13%	12%	5%	3%	2%	2%	6%	38%	43%	19%
8–22 May 2026	Institute of Irish Studies	University of Liverpool/ The Sunday Times	1,534	26.1%	18.9%	12.5%	13.2%	9.2%	9.5%	5.8%	1.1%	1.6%	3.8%	7.2%	36.4%	41.6%	23.7%
9–12 Apr 2026	LucidTalk	Belfast Telegraph	3,162	24%	18%	11%	13%	11%	11%	5%	3%	2%	2%	6%	38%	42%	20%
16–19 Jan 2026	LucidTalk	Belfast Telegraph	2,975	25%	19%	11%	13%	11%	11%	4%	2%	1%	3%	6%	38%	43%	19%
15 Jan 2026	Jon Burrows becomes the leader of the Ulster Unionist Party (UUP)																
Nov 2025	Institute of Irish Studies	University of Liverpool/The Irish News	N/A	25.3%	19.2%	12.6%	12.0%	9.2%	10.4%	5.1%	N/A	2.6%	3.6%	6.1%	34.5%	41.6%	23.9%
17–20 Oct 2025	LucidTalk	Belfast Telegraph	2,908	25%	18%	11%	12%	11%	13%	4%	2%	2%	2%	7%	38%	43%	19%
8–11 Aug 2025	LucidTalk	Belfast Telegraph	3,028	26%	17%	12%	11%	11%	13%	3%	2%	2%	3%	9%	39%	41%	20%
16–19 May 2025	LucidTalk	Belfast Telegraph	2,755	26%	18%	13%	12%	11%	12%	3%	2%	1%	2%	8%	39%	42%	19%
14–17 Feb 2025	LucidTalk	Belfast Telegraph	3,001	28%	19%	14%	11%	11%	11%	2%	1%	1%	2%	9%	40%	41%	19%
1–4 Nov 2024	LucidTalk	Belfast Telegraph	3,209	29%	19%	13%	10%	10%	11%	2%	1%	2%	3%	10%	40%	40%	20%
10 Oct 2024	Richard Boyd Barrett becomes the leader of People Before Profit (PBP)																
5 Oct 2024	Claire Hanna becomes the leader of the Social Democratic and Labour Party (SDLP)																
30 Aug 2024	Mike Nesbitt becomes the leader of the Ulster Unionist Party (UUP)																
29 Aug 2024	Colum Eastwood resigns as leader of the Social Democratic and Labour Party (SDLP)																
19 Aug 2024	Doug Beattie resigns as leader of the Ulster Unionist Party (UUP)																
16–19 Aug 2024	LucidTalk	Belfast Telegraph	3,443	30%	18%	15%	12%	8%	9%	2%	1%	1%	4%	12%	39%	39%	22%
4 Jul 2024	2024 general election		–	27.0%	22.1%	15.0%	12.2%	11.1%	6.2%	1.1%	1.0%	1.1%	3.3% Independent on 3.1%	7.6%	39.1%	40.5%	20.4%
10–13 May 2024	LucidTalk	Belfast Telegraph	1,021	29%	21%	15%	11%	8%	8%	1%	2%	1%	4%	8%	40%	40%	20%
29 Mar 2024	Jeffrey Donaldson resigns as leader of the Democratic Unionist Party (DUP)																
9–12 Feb 2024	LucidTalk	Belfast Telegraph	3,207	31%	24%	14%	10%	7%	6%	1%	2%	1%	4%	7%	40%	40%	20%
3 Feb 2024	Establishment of the new executive																
27–30 Oct 2023	LucidTalk	Belfast Telegraph	3,046	31%	28%	16%	8%	6%	4%	2%	1%	1%	2%	3%	38%	40%	22%
11–14 Aug 2023	LucidTalk	Belfast Telegraph	2,950	31%	26%	15%	10%	6%	5%	2%	2%	1%	2%	5%	39%	41%	20%
18 May 2023	2023 local elections		–	30.9%	23.3%	13.3%	10.9%	8.7%	3.9%	1.7%	0.9%	1.0%	5.4% NI Conservatives on 0.1%	7.6%	40.5%	38.1%	21.4%
21–24 Apr 2023	LucidTalk	Belfast Telegraph	3,557	29%	25%	13%	11%	7%	7%	2%	2%	1%	3%	4%	38%	43%	19%
3–14 Mar 2023	Institute of Irish Studies	University of Liverpool/The Irish News	N/A	30.6%	23.9%	15.4%	11.3%	6.7%	4.8%	3.2%	0.2%	2.2%	1.7% NI Conservatives on 1.3%	6.7%	37.5%	40%	22.5%
20–23 Jan 2023	LucidTalk	Belfast Telegraph	1,499	31%	25%	15%	10%	7%	7%	1%	2%	1%	1%	6%	40%	42%	18%
4–7 Nov 2022	LucidTalk	Belfast Telegraph	3,351	32%	27%	15%	9%	7%	5%	2%	1%	1%	1%	5%	40%	41%	19%
12–15 Aug 2022	LucidTalk	Belfast Telegraph	3,384	30%	24%	16%	11%	7%	6%	2%	2%	1%	1%	6%	39%	41%	20%
28 Jun – 10 Jul 2022	Institute of Irish Studies	University of Liverpool/The Irish News	1,000	30.9%	20.1%	15.3%	9.6%	10.0%	4.7%	2.8%	1.6%	2.2%	2.8%	10.8%	42.5%	34.4%	23.1%
5 May 2022	2022 Assembly election		–	29.0%	21.3%	13.5%	11.2%	9.1%	7.6%	1.9%	1.5%	1.1%	3.8% NI Conservatives on 0.03%	7.7%	39.6%	40.1%	20.3%

Note: Next to the party initials at the top of the table there are the letters "N", "O", and "U". These show how the parties have chosen to designate themselves, Unionist (U), Nationalist (N) or other (O), in the Assembly previously (or, in the case of Aontú, how they are expected to designate if they win a seat). This is a function of the Assembly's consociational design.

=== Leadership approval ratings ===
==== Michelle O'Neill ====
The following polls asked about voters' opinions on Michelle O'Neill, Vice President of Sinn Féin since 10 February 2018, First Minister of Northern Ireland since 3 February 2024 and deputy First Minister of Northern Ireland from 11 January 2020 to 4 February 2022.

Dates conducted	Pollster	Client	Sample size	Good/Great	Bad/Awful	Don't know	Net approval
9–12 February 2024	LucidTalk	Belfast Telegraph	3,207	54%	29%	17%	+25%
3 February 2024	O'Neill becomes First Minister of Northern Ireland						
11–14 August 2023	LucidTalk	Belfast Telegraph	2,950	43%	37%	20%	+6%
21–24 April 2023	LucidTalk	Belfast Telegraph	3,957	41%	37%	22%	+4%
20–23 January 2023	LucidTalk	Belfast Telegraph	1,449	41%	40%	19%	+4%
4–7 November 2022	LucidTalk	Belfast Telegraph	3,351	46%	37%	17%	+9%
12–15 August 2022	LucidTalk	Belfast Telegraph	3,384	40%	42%	18%	–2%

==== Jeffrey Donaldson ====
The following polls asked about voters' opinions on Jeffrey Donaldson, leader of the Democratic Unionist Party (DUP) until 29 March 2024.

Dates conducted	Pollster	Client	Sample size	Good/Great	Bad/Awful	Don't know	Net approval
29 March 2024	Donaldson resigns as leader of the Democratic Unionist Party (DUP)						
9–12 February 2024	LucidTalk	Belfast Telegraph	3,207	36%	48%	16%	–12%
11–14 August 2023	LucidTalk	Belfast Telegraph	2,950	24%	66%	10%	–42%
21–24 April 2023	LucidTalk	Belfast Telegraph	3,957	27%	65%	8%	–38%
20–23 January 2023	LucidTalk	Belfast Telegraph	1,449	25%	63%	12%	–38%
4–7 November 2022	LucidTalk	Belfast Telegraph	3,351	29%	65%	6%	–36%
12–15 August 2022	LucidTalk	Belfast Telegraph	3,384	27%	64%	9%	–37%

==== Naomi Long ====
The following polls asked about voters' opinions on Naomi Long, leader of the Alliance Party since 26 October 2016 and Minister of Justice since 3 February 2024 and from 11 January 2020 to 27 October 2022.

Dates conducted	Pollster	Client	Sample size	Good/Great	Bad/Awful	Don't know	Net approval
9–12 February 2024	LucidTalk	Belfast Telegraph	3,207	38%	36%	26%	+2%
3 February 2024	Long becomes Minister of Justice						
11–14 August 2023	LucidTalk	Belfast Telegraph	2,950	38%	39%	23%	–1%
21–24 April 2023	LucidTalk	Belfast Telegraph	3,957	40%	38%	22%	+2%
20–23 January 2023	LucidTalk	Belfast Telegraph	1,449	37%	38%	25%	–1%
4–7 November 2022	LucidTalk	Belfast Telegraph	3,351	45%	37%	18%	+8%
27 October 2022	Long is removed as Minister of Justice due to the collapse of the power-sharing Northern Ireland Executive						
12–15 August 2022	LucidTalk	Belfast Telegraph	3,384	46%	37%	17%	+9%

==== Doug Beattie ====
The following polls asked about voters' opinions on Doug Beattie, leader of the Ulster Unionist Party (UUP) since 27 May 2021.

Dates conducted	Pollster	Client	Sample size	Good/Great	Bad/Awful	Don't know	Net approval
19 August 2024	Beattie resigns as leader of the Ulster Unionist Party (UUP)						
9–12 February 2024	LucidTalk	Belfast Telegraph	3,207	35%	35%	30%	0%
11–14 August 2023	LucidTalk	Belfast Telegraph	2,950	34%	38%	28%	–4%
21–24 April 2023	LucidTalk	Belfast Telegraph	3,957	38%	33%	29%	+5%
20–23 January 2023	LucidTalk	Belfast Telegraph	1,449	28%	42%	30%	–14%
4–7 November 2022	LucidTalk	Belfast Telegraph	3,351	37%	32%	31%	+5%
12–15 August 2022	LucidTalk	Belfast Telegraph	3,384	34%	34%	32%	0%

==== Colum Eastwood ====
The following polls asked about voters' opinions on Colum Eastwood, leader of the Social Democratic and Labour Party (SDLP) from 14 November 2015 to 5 October 2024.

Dates conducted	Pollster	Client	Sample size	Good/Great	Bad/Awful	Don't know	Net approval
29 August 2024	Eastwood resigns as leader of the Social Democratic and Labour Party (SDLP)						
9–12 February 2024	LucidTalk	Belfast Telegraph	3,207	31%	41%	28%	–10%
11–14 August 2023	LucidTalk	Belfast Telegraph	2,950	26%	43%	31%	–17%
21–24 April 2023	LucidTalk	Belfast Telegraph	3,957	32%	40%	28%	–8%
20–23 January 2023	LucidTalk	Belfast Telegraph	1,449	33%	38%	29%	–5%
4–7 November 2022	LucidTalk	Belfast Telegraph	3,351	31%	39%	30%	–8%
12–15 August 2022	LucidTalk	Belfast Telegraph	3,384	34%	39%	27%	–5%

==== Jim Allister ====
The following polls asked about voters' opinions on Jim Allister, leader of Traditional Unionist Voice (TUV) since 7 December 2007.

Dates conducted	Pollster	Client	Sample size	Good/Great	Bad/Awful	Don't know	Net approval
4 July 2024	Allister is elected as Member of Parliament (MP) for North Antrim						
9–12 February 2024	LucidTalk	Belfast Telegraph	3,207	20%	70%	10%	–50%
11–14 August 2023	LucidTalk	Belfast Telegraph	2,950	23%	63%	14%	–40%
21–24 April 2023	LucidTalk	Belfast Telegraph	3,957	27%	61%	12%	–34%
20–23 January 2023	LucidTalk	Belfast Telegraph	1,449	27%	57%	16%	–30%
4–7 November 2022	LucidTalk	Belfast Telegraph	3,351	27%	59%	14%	–32%
12–15 August 2022	LucidTalk	Belfast Telegraph	3,384	31%	54%	15%	–23%

=== Leadership performance ratings ===
==== Northern Ireland political leaders ====
Dates conducted	Pollster	Client	Sample size	Michelle O'Neill^{Sinn Féin VP First Minister}	Gavin Robinson^{DUP leader (2024–)}	Emma Little-Pengelly^{deputy First Minister}	Naomi Long^{Alliance leader}	Jon Burrows^{UUP Leader (2026–)}	Mike Nesbitt^{UUP Leader (2024–2026)}	Doug Beattie^{UUP Leader (2021–2024)}	Claire Hanna^{SDLP Leader (2024–)}	Colum Eastwood^{SDLP Leader (2015–2024)}	Jim Allister^{TUV Leader}	Northern Ireland Executive	Lead
29-31 October 2026	LucidTalk	Belfast Telegraph	3,989	41%	30%	36%	30%	45%			52%		30%	29%	7%
9–12 April 2026	LucidTalk	Belfast Telegraph	3,162	38%	38%	44%	32%	46%			50%		34%	34%	4%
31 January 2026	Jon Burrows is elected as leader of the Ulster Unionist Party (UUP)														
2 January 2026	Mike Nesbitt resigns as leader of the Ulster Unionist Party (UUP)														
8–11 August 2025	LucidTalk	Belfast Telegraph	3,028	44%	38%	41%	37%		41%		48%		38%	35%	4%
1–4 November 2024	LucidTalk	Belfast Telegraph	3,209	41%	43%	51%	40%		46%		54%		37%	38%	3%
5 October 2024	Claire Hanna is elected as leader of the Social Democratic and Labour Party (SDLP)														
28 September 2024	Mike Nesbitt is elected as leader of the Ulster Unionist Party (UUP)														
29 August 2024	Colum Eastwood resigns as leader of the Social Democratic and Labour Party (SDLP)														
16 August 2024	Doug Beattie resigns as leader of the Ulster Unionist Party (UUP)														
4 July 2024	Jim Allister is elected as Member of Parliament (MP) for North Antrim														
29 May 2024	Gavin Robinson is elected as leader of the Democratic Unionist Party (DUP)														
28 May 2024	Mike Nesbitt becomes Minister of Health														
10–13 May 2024	LucidTalk	Belfast Telegraph	3,316	53%	46%	52%	46%			44%		39%	29%	39%	1%
29 March 2024	Jeffrey Donaldson resigns as leader of the Democratic Unionist Party (DUP)														
3 February 2024	Naomi Long becomes Minister of Justice														
3 February 2024	Emma Little-Pengelly becomes deputy First Minister of Northern Ireland														
3 February 2024	Michelle O'Neill becomes First Minister of Northern Ireland														
3 February 2024	Establishment of the new Executive														
27 October 2022	Naomi Long is removed as Minister of Justice due to the collapse of the power-sharing Northern Ireland Executive														

==== Northern Ireland Executive ministers and Leader of the Opposition ====
Dates conducted	Pollster	Client	Sample size	Michelle O'Neill^{First Minister}	Caoimhe Archibald^{Economy Minister}	Liz Kimmins^{Infrastructure Minister}	Conor Murphy	John O'Dowd^{Finance Minister}	Emma Little-Pengelly^{deputy First Minister}	Paul Givan^{Education Minister}	Gordon Lyons^{Communities Minister}	Naomi Long^{Justice Minister}	Andrew Muir^{AERA Minister}	Mike Nesbitt^{Health Minister}	Matthew O'Toole^{Leader of the Opposition}	Northern Ireland Executive	Lead
16–19 January 2026	LucidTalk	Belfast Telegraph	2,975	43%	40%	35%		42%	44%	36%	38%	33%	36%	47%	45%	34%	2%
2 January 2026	Mike Nesbitt resigns as leader of the Ulster Unionist Party (UUP)																
14–17 February 2025	LucidTalk	Belfast Telegraph	3,316	49%	48%		43%	37%	52%	33%	40%	39%	39%	45%			3%
3 February 2025	Liz Kimmins replaces John O'Dowd as Minister for Infrastructure																
3 February 2025	John O'Dowd replaces Caoimhe Archibald as Minister of Finance																
3 February 2025	Caoimhe Archibald replaces Conor Murphy as Minister for the Economy																
28 September 2024	Mike Nesbitt is elected as leader of the Ulster Unionist Party (UUP)																
28 May 2024	Mike Nesbitt replaces Robin Swann as Minister of Health																
28 May 2024	Conor Murphy replaces Deirdre Hargey as Minister for the Economy																
8 May 2024	Deirdre Hargey replaces Conor Murphy as Minister for the Economy																
3 February 2024	Matthew O'Toole becomes Leader of the Opposition																
3 February 2024	Establishment of the new Executive																
27 October 2022	Matthew O'Toole is removed from office as Leader of the Opposition due to the collapse of the power-sharing Northern Ireland Executive																
27 October 2022	Ministers are removed from office due to the collapse of the power-sharing Northern Ireland Executive																
25 July 2022	Matthew O'Toole becomes Leader of the Opposition																

==== UK and Ireland political leaders ====
Dates conducted	Pollster	Client	Sample size	Micheál Martin^{Taoiseach (2020–2022; 2025– )}	Simon Harris^{Taoiseach (2024–2025)}	Mary Lou McDonald^{Sinn Féin President}	Chris Bryant^{Secretary of State (2026- )}	Hilary Benn^{Secretary of State (2024–2026)}	Chris Heaton-Harris^{Secretary of State (2022–2024)}	Andy Burnham^{UK Prime Minister (2026- )}	Keir Starmer^{UK Prime Minister (2024–2026)}	Rishi Sunak^{UK Prime Minister (2022–2024)}	Lead
29-31 October 2026	LucidTalk	Belfast Telegraph	3,989	37%		35%	40%			45%			5%
20 July 2026	Chris Bryant becomes Secretary of State for Northern Ireland												
20 July 2026	Andy Burnham becomes Prime Minister of the United Kingdom												
9–12 April 2026	LucidTalk	Belfast Telegraph	3,162	35%		31%		30%			24%		4%
8–11 August 2025	LucidTalk	Belfast Telegraph	3,028	37%		36%		33%			18%		1%
23 January 2025	Micheál Martin becomes Taoiseach												
8–11 August 2025	LucidTalk	Belfast Telegraph	3,028		43%	31%		43%			31%		Tie
5 July 2024	Hilary Benn becomes Secretary of State for Northern Ireland												
5 July 2024	Keir Starmer becomes Prime Minister of the United Kingdom												
10–13 May 2024	LucidTalk	Belfast Telegraph	3,316		36%	39%			20%			16%	3%
9 April 2024	Simon Harris becomes Taoiseach												
17 December 2022	Leo Varadkar becomes Taoiseach												
25 October 2022	Rishi Sunak becomes Prime Minister of the United Kingdom												
6 September 2022	Chris Heaton-Harris becomes Secretary of State for Northern Ireland												
6 September 2022	Liz Truss becomes Prime Minister of the United Kingdom												
7 July 2022	Shailesh Vara becomes Secretary of State for Northern Ireland												

== See also ==
- 2024 United Kingdom general election in Northern Ireland
- 2027 Northern Ireland local elections
