= 2027 Northern Ireland local elections =

Upcoming Council elections for Northern Ireland

2027 Northern Irish local elections
- 6 May 2027

All 462 council seats to 11 Northern Irish councils
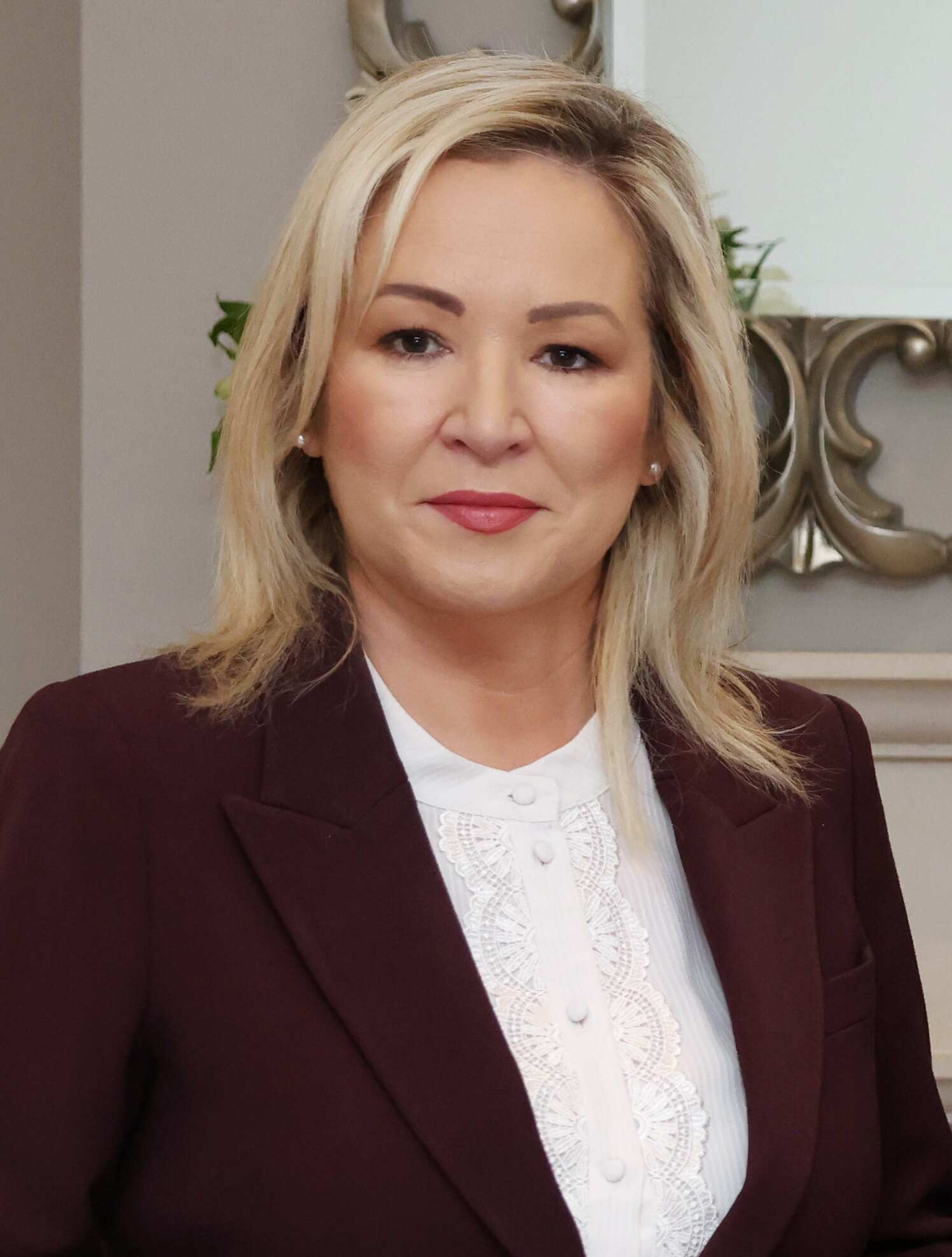

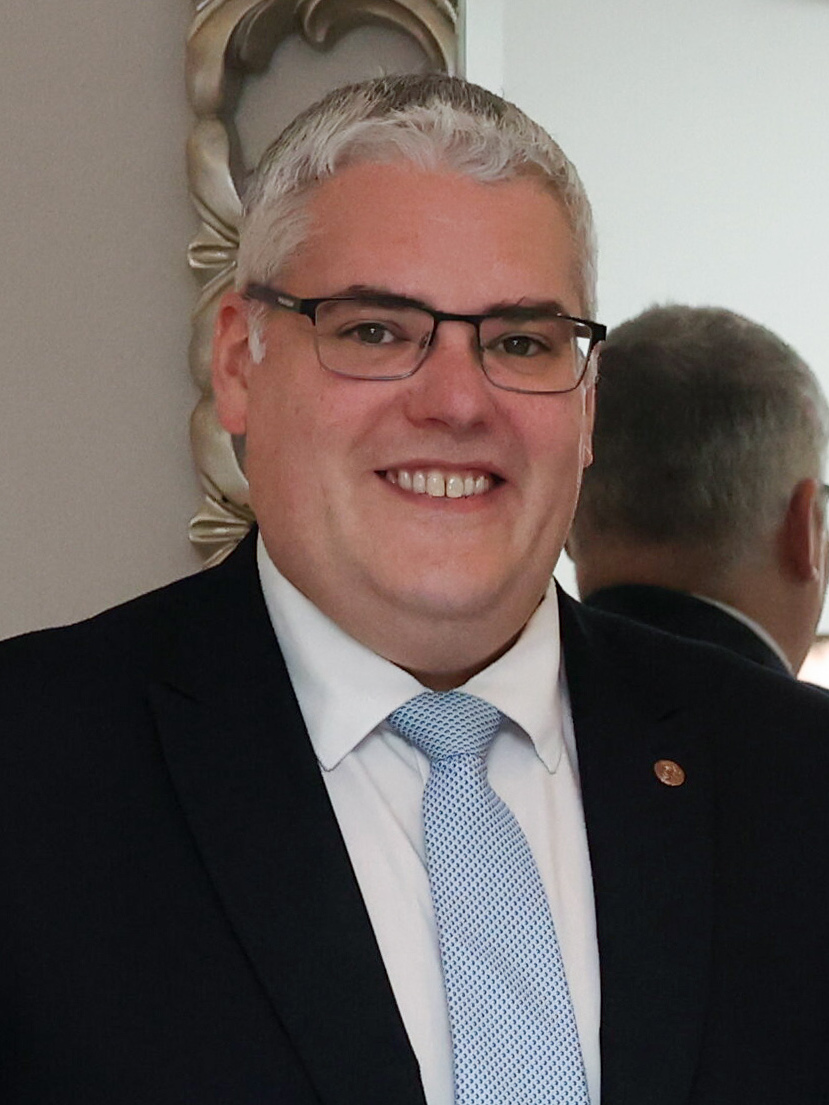

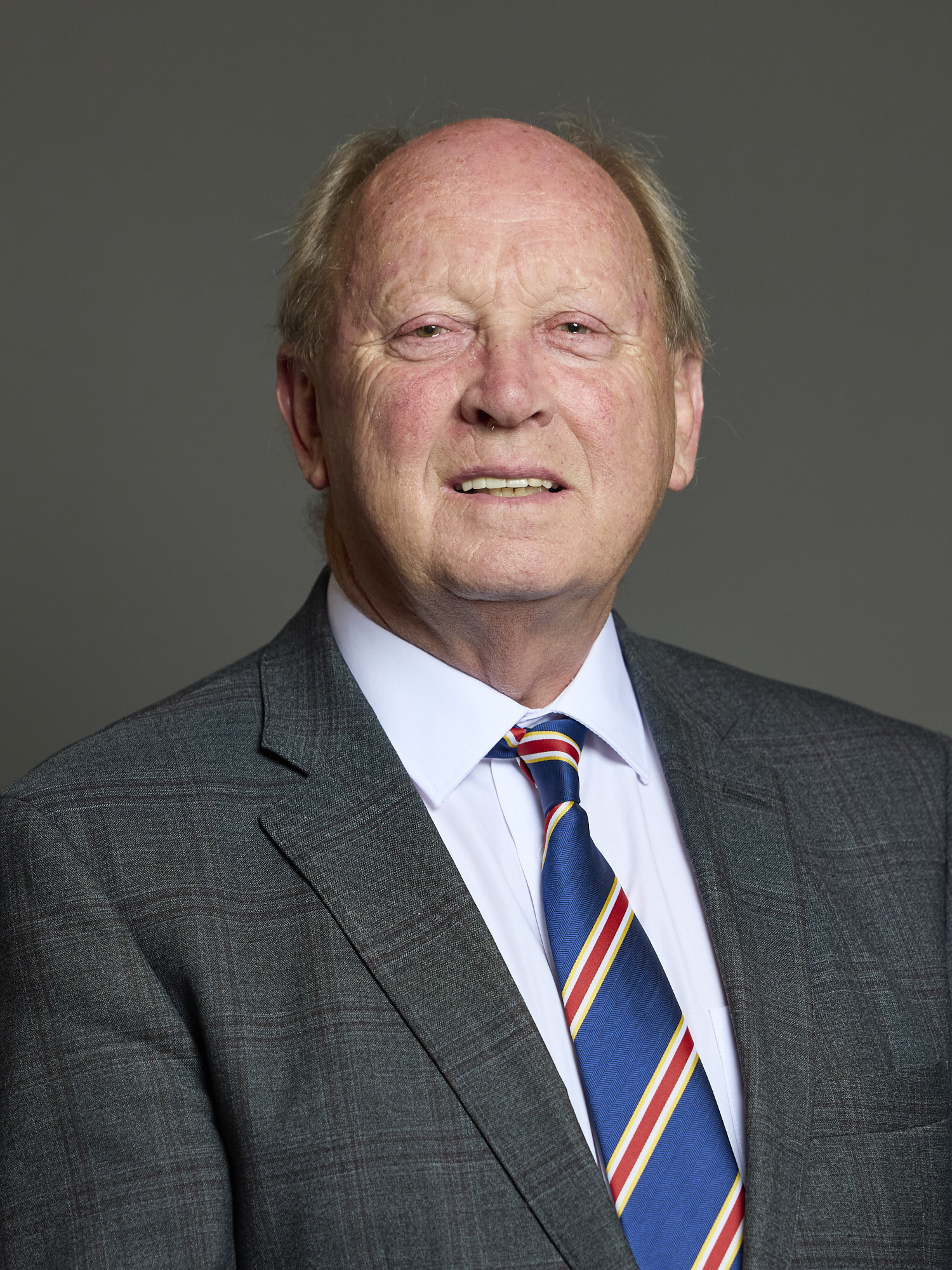

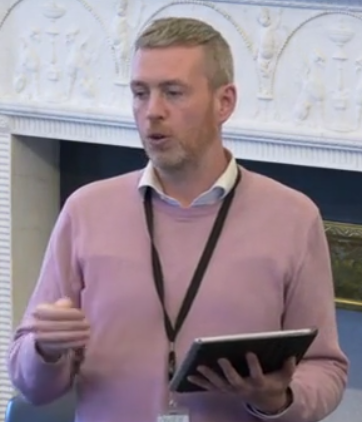

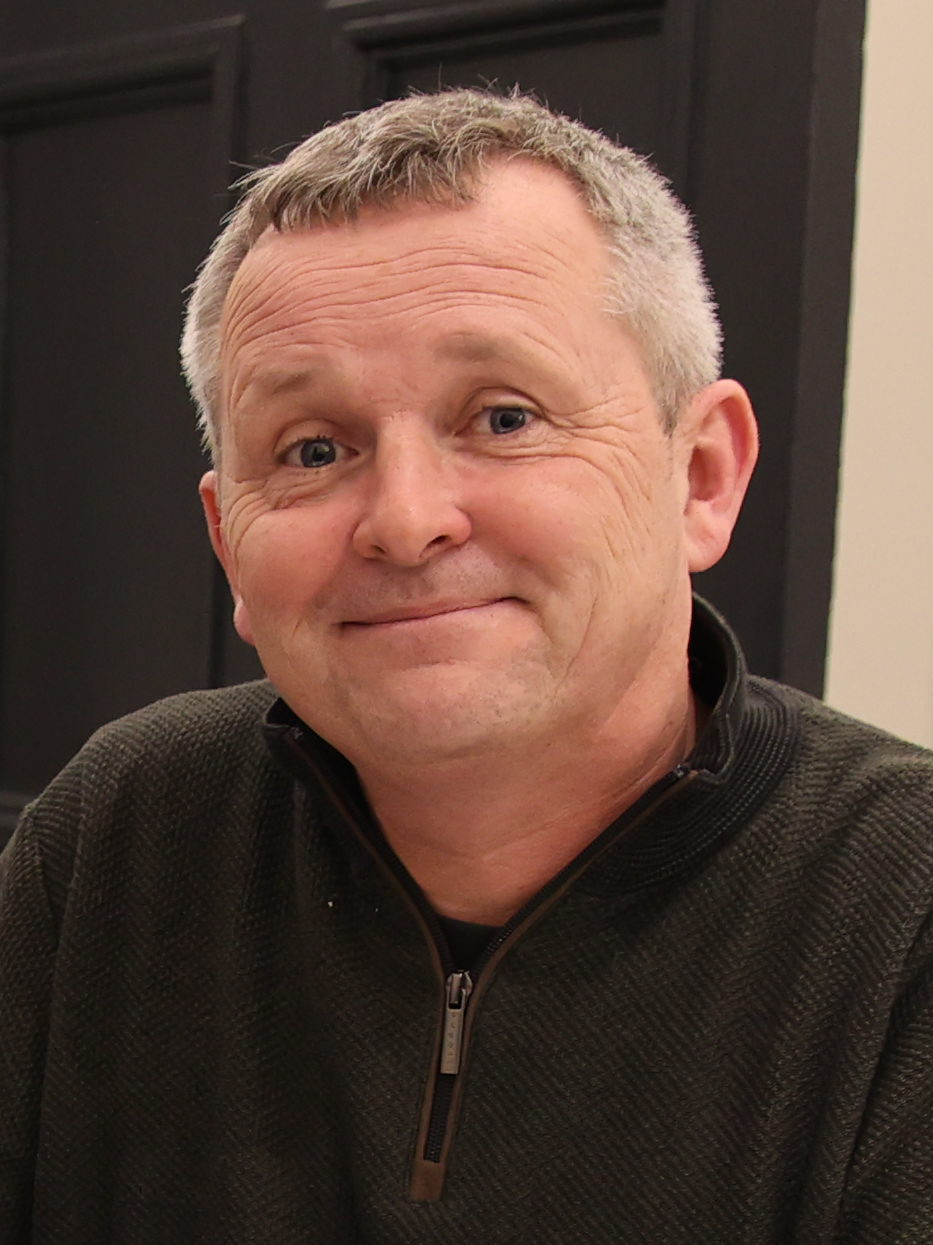
Leader	Michelle O'Neill (Note: Sinn Féin's president is Mary Lou McDonald, who is a TD for Dublin Central in Dáil Éireann, the lower house of the Oireachtas (legislature of the Republic of Ireland). O'Neill is the party's vice president and leads the party in Northern Ireland.)	Gavin Robinson	Naomi Long
Party	Sinn Féin	DUP	Alliance
Leader since	23 January 2017 (Note: As "Party leader in the North")	29 May 2024	26 October 2016
Last election	144 seats, 31.2%	122 seats, 23.3%	67 seats, 13.3%
Current seats	144	119	65
Leader	Jon Burrows	Claire Hanna	Jim Allister
Party	UUP	SDLP	TUV
Leader since	31 January 2026	5 October 2024	7 December 2007
Last election	54 seats, 10.9%	39 seats, 8.7%	9 seat, 3.9%
Current seats	51	35	10
Leader	Mal O'Hara	Richard Boyd Barrett
Party	Green (NI)	People Before Profit
Leader since	15 August 2022	10 October 2024
Last election	5, 1.7%	2 seat, 1.0-%
Current seats	5	2

The 2027 Northern Irish local elections will be held on 6 May 2027, as part of the 2027 United Kingdom local elections. All 462 seats across all 11 Northern Irish local authorities are up for election. They should occur on the same day as the Northern Irish Assembly elections 2027

== Electoral system ==
Northern Ireland uses the single transferable vote (STV) electoral system to elect members of local councils and members of the Northern Ireland Assembly. Voters rank candidates in order of preference by marking 1, 2, 3, etc. to the names of candidates on a ballot paper and can rank as many or as few candidates as they like or just vote for one candidate.

== See also ==
- Next Northern Ireland Assembly election
- 2027 United Kingdom local elections
- 2027 Scottish local elections
- Politics of Northern Ireland
