= List of statutory rules of Northern Ireland, 2016 =

This is a list of statutory rules made in the Northern Ireland in 2016.

== 1–100 ==
Number	Title
1	The Human Trafficking and Exploitation (Slavery and Trafficking Prevention Orders) (Notification Requirements) Regulations (Northern Ireland) 2016
2	The Passenger and Goods Vehicles (Recording Equipment) (Downloading of Data) (Amendment) Regulations (Northern Ireland) 2016
3	The Parking and Waiting Restrictions (Banbridge) (Amendment) Order (Northern Ireland) 2016
4	The Animal Feed (Composition, Marketing and Use) Regulations (Northern Ireland) 2016
5	The Animal Feed (Hygiene, Sampling etc. and Enforcement) Regulations (Northern Ireland) 2016
6	The Housing Benefit (Executive Determinations) (Amendment) Regulations (Northern Ireland) 2016
7	The Parking and Waiting Restrictions (Lurgan) Order (Northern Ireland) 2016
8	Change of Council Name (Derry and Strabane City Council) Regulations (Northern Ireland) 2016
9	Change of District Name (Derry and Strabane) Order (Northern Ireland) 2016
10	Change of District Name (North Down and Ards) Order (Northern Ireland) 2016
11	Change of District Name (Armagh, Banbridge and Craigavon) Order (Northern Ireland) 2016
12	The Control of Traffic (Queen Street, Belfast) Order (Northern Ireland) 2016
13	The Parking Places and Waiting Restrictions (College Street / Queen Street, Belfast) Order (Northern Ireland) 2016
14	The Northern Ireland Police Fund Regulations 2016
15	The Areas of Natural Constraint Regulations (Northern Ireland) 2016
16	The Rates (Regional Rates) Order (Northern Ireland) 2016
17	The Rates (Exemption for Automatic Telling Machines in Rural Areas) Order (Northern Ireland) 2016 (revoked)
18	The Rates (Temporary Rebate) (Amendment) Order (Northern Ireland) 2016
19	The Bus Lanes (Belfast City Centre) (Amendment) Order (Northern Ireland) 2016
20	The Parking Places on Roads (Ballynahinch) Order (Northern Ireland) 2016
21	The Education (Student Support) (Amendment) Regulations (Northern Ireland) 2016
22	The Bovine Viral Diarrhoea Eradication Scheme Order (Northern Ireland) 2016
23 (C. 1)	The Coroners and Justice Act 2009 (Commencement No.2) (Northern Ireland) Order 2016
24	The Police Pensions (Consequential Provisions) (Amendment) Regulations (Northern Ireland) 2016
25	The Pensions (2015 Act) (Consequential, Supplementary and Incidental Amendments) Order (Northern Ireland) 2016
26	The Rates (Small Business Hereditament Relief) (Amendment) Regulations (Northern Ireland) 2016
27	The Planning (Local Development Plan) (Amendment) Regulations (Northern Ireland) 2016
28	The Emissions Performance Standard Monitoring and Enforcement Regulations (Northern Ireland) 2016
29	The Misuse of Drugs (Amendment) Regulations (Northern Ireland) 2016
30	The Disabled Persons (Badges for Motor Vehicles) (Amendment) Regulations (Northern Ireland) 2016
31	The Parking Places on Roads (Disabled Persons’ Vehicles) (Amendment) Order (Northern Ireland) 2016
32	The Pension Protection Fund and Occupational Pension Schemes (Levy Ceiling and Compensation Cap) Order (Northern Ireland) 2016 (revoked)
33	The Proceeds of Crime Act 2002 (Application of Police and Criminal Evidence (Northern Ireland) Order 1989) Order (Northern Ireland) 2016
34	The Public Service (Civil Servants and Others) Pensions (Consequential Provisions) (Amendment) Regulations (Northern Ireland) 2016
35	The Salaries (Assembly Ombudsman and Commissioner for Complaints) Order (Northern Ireland) 2016
36	The College Street, Belfast (Stopping-Up) Order (Northern Ireland) 2016
37	The Employment Rights (Increase of Limits) Order (Northern Ireland) 2016
38	The Green Road, Conlig (Abandonment) Order (Northern Ireland) 2016
39	The Moyallan Road, Portadown and College Lands Road, Charlemont (Part-Time 20 mph Speed Limit) Order (Northern Ireland) 2016
40	The Former Route C646 Killyliss Road, Dungannon (Abandonment) Order (Northern Ireland) 2016
41	The Police (Conduct) Regulations (Northern Ireland) 2016
42	The Police (Performance and Attendance) Regulations (Northern Ireland) 2016
43	The Police Appeals Tribunals Regulations (Northern Ireland) 2016
44	The Social Security (Housing Costs Amendments) Regulations (Northern Ireland) 2016
45	The Prohibition of Right-Hand Turn (Portadown) Order (Northern Ireland) 2016
46 (C. 2)	The Welfare Reform (Northern Ireland) Order 2015 (Commencement No. 1) Order 2016
47	The Renewable Heat Incentive Schemes (Amendment) Regulations (Northern Ireland) 2016
48	The Modern Slavery Act 2015 (Duty to co-operate with Commissioner) (Northern Irish public authority) Regulations (Northern Ireland) 2016
49	The Working Time Regulations (Northern Ireland) 2016
50	The Public Service Pensions Revaluation (Earnings) Order (Northern Ireland) 2016
51	The Parking Places, Loading Bays and Waiting Restrictions Amendments (Lisburn) Order (Northern Ireland) 2016
52	The Parking Places, Loading Bays and Waiting Restrictions (Coleraine) (Amendment) Order (Northern Ireland) 2016
53	The Parking and Waiting Restrictions (Omagh) (Amendment) Order (Northern Ireland) 2016
54	The Animals and Animal Products (Examination for Residues and Maximum Residue Limits) Regulations (Northern Ireland) 2016
55	The Benefit Cap (Housing Benefit) Regulations (Northern Ireland) 2016
56	The Social Security (Information-sharing in relation to Welfare Services etc.) Regulations (Northern Ireland) 2016
57	The Mental Health Review Tribunal (Amendment) Rules (Northern Ireland) 2016
58	The Criminal Justice Act 1988 (Reviews of Sentencing) Order (Northern Ireland) 2016
59	The Agriculture (Student fees)(Amendment) Regulations (Northern Ireland) 2016 (revoked)
60	Not Allocated
61 (C. 3)	The Human Trafficking and Exploitation (2015 Act) (Commencement No.2) Order (Northern Ireland) 2016
62	Not Allocated
63	The Social Security (Penalty Notice) (Amendment) Regulations (Northern Ireland) 2016
64	The Proceeds of Crime Act 2002 (Search, Seizure and Detention of Property: Code of Practice) Order (Northern Ireland) 2016 (revoked)
65	The Proceeds of Crime Act 2002 (Cash Searches: Code of Practice) Order (Northern Ireland) 2016 (revoked)
66	The Proceeds of Crime Act 2002 (Investigations: Code of Practice) Order (Northern Ireland) 2016 (revoked)
67	The Social Security (Lone Parents and Miscellaneous Amendments) Regulations (Northern Ireland) 2016
68 (C. 4)	The Pensions (2015 Act) (Commencement No. 3) Order (Northern Ireland) 2016
69	The Rates (Automatic Telling Machines) (Designation of Rural Areas) Order (Northern Ireland) 2016 (revoked)
70	The Superannuation (Certification Officer for Northern Ireland) Order (Northern Ireland) 2016
71	The Public Service Pensions (Certification Officer for Northern Ireland) Regulations (Northern Ireland) 2016 (revoked)
72	The Social Security Revaluation of Earnings Factors Order (Northern Ireland) 2016
73	The Train Driving Licences and Certificates (Amendment) Regulations (Northern Ireland) 2016
74	The Damages for Bereavement (Variation of Sum) (Northern Ireland) Order 2016
75	The Zoonoses (Fees) (Amendment) Regulations (Northern Ireland) 2016
76	The Departments (Transfer of Functions) Order (Northern Ireland) 2016
77	The Charities Act 2008 (Designated Religious Charities) Order (Northern Ireland) 2016
78	The Pensions (2015 Act) (Consequential and Supplementary Amendments) Order (Northern Ireland) 2016
79	The Producer Responsibility Obligations (Packaging Waste) (Amendment) Regulations (Northern Ireland) 2016
80	The State Pension (Amendment) Regulations (Northern Ireland) 2016
81	The Modern Slavery Act 2015 (Power of arrest: Code of Practice) Order (Northern Ireland) 2016
82	The Police Pensions (Additional Voluntary Contributions) (Amendment) Regulations (Northern Ireland) 2016
83	The Road Races (Mid-Antrim 150) Order (Northern Ireland) 2016
84	The Renewables Obligation (Amendment) Order (Northern Ireland) 2016
85	The Bus Lanes (Upper Newtownards Road, Belfast – between Holywood Road and Sandown Road) Order (Northern Ireland) 2016
86	The Control of Traffic (A2, Shore Road, Greenisland) Order (Northern Ireland) 2016
87	The Whole of Government Accounts (Designation of Bodies) Order (Northern Ireland) 2016
88	The State Pension (Amendment No. 2) Regulations (Northern Ireland) 2016
89 (C. 5)	The Departments (2016 Act) (Commencement) Order (Northern Ireland) 2016
90	The Taxis Act (Northern Ireland) 2008 (Retention and Disposal of Seized Motor Vehicles, Equipment and Items) Regulations (Northern Ireland) 2016
91	The Social Security (Claims and Payments) (Amendment) Regulations (Northern Ireland) 2016 (revoked)
92	The Social Security Benefits Up-rating Order (Northern Ireland) 2016
93	The Magistrates’ Courts (Amendment) Rules (Northern Ireland) 2016
94	The Magistrates' Courts (Violent Offences Prevention Orders) Rules (Northern Ireland) 2016
95	The Waste (Amendment) Regulations (Northern Ireland) 2016
96	The Waste Management Licensing (Amendment) Regulations (Northern Ireland) 2016
97	The Tobacco Retailer (Registration and Display of Notices) Regulations (Northern Ireland) 2016
98	The Tobacco Retailer (Fixed Penalty) (General) Regulations (Northern Ireland) 2016
99	The Pensions (2015 Act) (Pension Sharing on Divorce etc.) (Transitional Provision) Order (Northern Ireland) 2016
100	The State Pension (Amendment No. 3) Regulations (Northern Ireland) 2016

== 101–200 ==
Number	Title
101 (C. 6)	The Tobacco Retailers (2014 Act) (Commencement No. 2) Order (Northern Ireland) 2016
102	The Human Trafficking and Exploitation (Amendment of Slavery or Human Trafficking Offences and Relevant UK Orders) Order (Northern Ireland) 2016
103	The Trunk Road T10 (Cornamuck Realignment) Order (Northern Ireland) 2016
104	The Health and Social Care (Disciplinary Procedures) Regulations (Northern Ireland) 2016
105	The Recovery of Health Services Charges (Amounts) (Amendment) Regulations (Northern Ireland) 2016
106	The Pensions (2015 Act) (Savings) Order (Northern Ireland) 2016
107	The Occupational Pension Schemes (Schemes that were Contracted-out) Regulations (Northern Ireland) 2016
108	The Debt Relief Act (Northern Ireland) 2010 (Consequential Amendments) Order (Northern Ireland) 2016
109	The Social Security Benefits Up-rating Regulations (Northern Ireland) 2016 (revoked)
110	The Social Security Benefits (Adjustment of Amounts and Thresholds) Regulations (Northern Ireland) 2016
111	The Complaints Tribunal (Curriculum and Related Matters) Regulations (Northern Ireland) 2016
112	The River Lagan Foot/Cycle Bridge Order (Northern Ireland) 2016
113	The Trunk Roads T7, T17 and T22 (Londonderry to Dungiven) Order (Northern Ireland) 2016
114	The River Lagan (Diversion of Navigable Watercourse and Extinguishment of Public Rights of Navigation) Order (Northern Ireland) 2016
115	The Planning (General Development Procedure) (Amendment) Order (Northern Ireland) 2016
116	The Planning (Hazardous Substances) (No.2) (Amendment) Regulations (Northern Ireland) 2016
117	The Planning (Listed Buildings) (Amendment) Regulations (Northern Ireland) 2016
118	The Northern Ireland Poultry Health Assurance Scheme (Fees) (Amendment) Order (Northern Ireland) 2016
119	The Groundwater (Amendment) Regulations (Northern Ireland) 2016
120	The Registration of Fish Buyers and Sellers and Designation of Fish Auction Sites (Amendment) Regulations (Northern Ireland) 2016
121	The Footway (Prohibition of Waiting) (Heather Drive, Newtownabbey) Order (Northern Ireland) 2016
122	Not Allocated
123	The Court Files Privileged Access Rules (Northern Ireland) 2016
124	The Parking and Waiting Restrictions (Dungannon) Order (Northern Ireland) 2016
125	The Licensing (Register of Licences) (Amendment) Regulations (Northern Ireland) 2016
126 (C. 7)	The Licensing of Pavement Cafés Act (Northern Ireland) 2014 (Commencement) Order (Northern Ireland) 2016
127	The Licensing of Pavement Cafés (Register of Licences) Regulations (Northern Ireland) 2016
128	The Local Government Pension Scheme (Amendment) Regulations (Northern Ireland) 2016
129	The Electricity (Single Wholesale Market) Order (Amendment) Regulations (Northern Ireland) 2016
130	The Urban Clearways Order (Northern Ireland) 2016
131	The Parking Places (Disabled Persons' Vehicles) Order (Northern Ireland) 2016
132	The Licensing of Pavement Cafés (Form of Licence) Regulations (Northern Ireland) 2016
133	The Statutory Paternity Pay, Statutory Adoption Pay and Statutory Shared Parental Pay (Amendment) Regulations (Northern Ireland) 2016
134	The Teachers’ Pension Scheme (Consequential Provisions) (Amendment) Regulations (Northern Ireland) 2016
135	The Motor Vehicles (Driving Licences) (Amendment) Regulations (Northern Ireland) 2016
136 (C. 8)	The Justice (2015 Act) (Commencement No. 5) Order (Northern Ireland) 2016
137	The Scrapie (Fees) (Amendment) Regulations (Northern Ireland) 2016
138	The Judicial Pensions (Amendment) Regulations (Northern Ireland) 2016
139	Not Allocated
140	The Taxi Licensing (Amendment) Regulations (Northern Ireland) 2016
141	The Occupational Pension Schemes (Requirement to obtain Audited Accounts and a Statement from the Auditor) (Amendment) Regulations (Northern Ireland) 2016
142	The Occupational and Personal Pension Schemes (Automatic Enrolment) (Miscellaneous Amendments) Regulations (Northern Ireland) 2016
143	The Salaries (Public Services Ombudsman) Order (Northern Ireland) 2016 (revoked)
144	The Occupational and Personal Pension Schemes (Modification of Schemes and Miscellaneous Amendments) Regulations (Northern Ireland) 2016
145	The Violent Offences Prevention Order (Notification Requirements) Regulations (Northern Ireland) 2016
146	The Construction (Design and Management) Regulations (Northern Ireland) 2016
147	The Social Security (Scottish Rate of Income Tax etc.) (Amendment) Regulations (Northern Ireland) 2016
148	The Taxis (Taximeters, Devices and Maximum Fares) (Amendment) Regulations (Northern Ireland) 2016
149	The Social Security (Great Britain Reciprocal Arrangements) Regulations (Northern Ireland) 2016
150	Not Allocated
151	The Loading Bays and Parking Places on Roads (Amendment) Order (Northern Ireland) 2016
152 (C. 9)	The Water and Sewerage Services (2006 Order) (Commencement No.4) Order (Northern Ireland) 2016
153	The Parking Places on Roads (Motor Cycles) (Amendment) Order (Northern Ireland) 2016
154	The Road Races (Tandragee 100) Order (Northern Ireland) 2016
155	The Parking Places on Roads (Coaches) (Belfast) Order (Northern Ireland) 2016
156	The Road Races (Cookstown 100) Order (Northern Ireland) 2016
157	The Parking and Waiting Restrictions (Omagh) (Amendment No. 2) Order (Northern Ireland) 2016
158	The Pensions (2015 Act) (Abolition of Contracting-out for Salary Related Pension Schemes) (Consequential Amendments and Savings) Order (Northern Ireland) 2016
159 (C. 10)	The Planning (2011 Act) (Commencement No.3) and (Transitional Provisions) (Amendment) Order (Northern Ireland) 2016
160	The Motor Vehicles (Construction and Use) (Amendment) Regulations (Northern Ireland) 2016
161	The Firefighters’ Pension Scheme (Consequential Provisions) (Amendment) Regulations (Northern Ireland) 2016
162	The Pensions (2015 Act) (Contributions Equivalent Premium) (Consequential Provision) and (Savings) (Amendment) Order (Northern Ireland) 2016
163	The Health Service Workers (Consequential Provisions) (Amendment) Regulations (Northern Ireland) 2016
164	The Driver and Vehicle Agency Trading Fund Order (Northern Ireland) 2016
165	The Pension Protection Fund and Occupational and Personal Pension Schemes (Miscellaneous Amendments) Regulations (Northern Ireland) 2016
166 (C. 11)	The Welfare Reform (Northern Ireland) Order 2015 (Commencement No. 2) Order 2016
167	The Prohibition of Left-Hand Turn (Castle Street, Belfast) Order (Northern Ireland) 2016
168	The Road Races (Croft Hill Climb) Order (Northern Ireland) 2016
169	The River Road, Dunmurry (Abandonment) Order (Northern Ireland) 2016
170	The Pharmaceutical Society of Northern Ireland (General) (Amendment) Regulations (Northern Ireland) 2016
171	The Occupational Pension Schemes (Charges and Governance) (Amendment) Regulations (Northern Ireland) 2016
172	The Pension Sharing (Miscellaneous Amendments) Regulations (Northern Ireland) 2016
173	The Disabled Persons (Badges for Motor Vehicles) (Amendment No. 2) Regulations (Northern Ireland) 2016
174	The Renewables Obligation Closure Order (Northern Ireland) 2016
175	The Employment and Support Allowance (Duration of Contributory Allowance) (Consequential Amendments) Regulations (Northern Ireland) 2016
176	The Employment and Support Allowance (Amendment of Linking Rules) Regulations (Northern Ireland) 2016
177	The Public Service Pensions (Certification Officer for Northern Ireland) (No.2) Regulations (Northern Ireland) 2016
178	The Welfare Supplementary Payments Regulations (Northern Ireland) 2016
179	The Road Races (Circuit of Ireland Rally) Order (Northern Ireland) 2016
180	The Tobacco Retailer (Fixed Penalty) (Amount) Regulations (Northern Ireland) 2016
181	The Road Traffic (Fixed Penalty) (Offences) (Amendment) Order (Northern Ireland) 2016
182	The Road Traffic (Fixed Penalty) (Amendment) Order (Northern Ireland) 2016
183	The Local Government (Community Planning Partners) Order (Northern Ireland) 2016
184	The Public Service Pensions Revaluation (Prices) Order (Northern Ireland) 2016
185	The Thorburn Road, Belfast (Abandonment) Order (Northern Ireland) 2016
186	The Parking and Waiting Restrictions (Londonderry) (Amendment) Order (Northern Ireland) 2016
187	The Weights and Measures (Food) (Amendment) Regulations (Northern Ireland) 2016
188	The Social Security (Reciprocal Agreements) Order (Northern Ireland) 2016
189	The Social Security (Reciprocal Agreement) (Isle of Man) Order (Northern Ireland) 2016
190	The Seed Potatoes Regulations (Northern Ireland) 2016
191	The Sex Discrimination Order 1976 (Amendment) Regulations (Northern Ireland) 2016
192	The Occupational Pension Schemes (Scheme Administration) (Amendment) Regulations (Northern Ireland) 2016
193	The Child Support (Deduction Orders and Fees) (Amendment and Modification) Regulations (Northern Ireland) 2016
194	The Penalty Fares (Increase) Order (Northern Ireland) 2016
195	The Pensions (2015 Act) (Transitional and Transitory Provisions) Order (Northern Ireland) 2016
196	The Automatic Enrolment (Earnings Trigger and Qualifying Earnings Band) Order (Northern Ireland) 2016 (revoked)
197	The Criminal Defence Services (General) Regulations (Northern Ireland) 2016
198	The Criminal Defence Services (Remuneration) Order (Northern Ireland) 2016
199 (C. 12)	The Access to Justice (2003 Order) (Commencement No. 9) Order (Northern Ireland) 2016
200	The Legal Aid for Crown Court Proceedings (Costs) (Amendment) Rules (Northern Ireland) 2016

=== 201–242 ===
Number	Title
201	The Legal Aid for Crown Court Proceedings (Costs) (Amendment No. 2) Rules (Northern Ireland) 2016
202	The Civil Legal Services (Scope) Regulations (Northern Ireland) 2016
203 (C. 13)	The Insolvency (Amendment) (2016 Act) (Commencement No. 1 and Transitional Provisions) Order (Northern Ireland) 2016
204	The Waiting Restrictions (Donaghmore) Order (Northern Ireland) 2016
205	The General Register Office (Fees) Order (Northern Ireland) 2016
206	The Road Races (Craigantlet Hill Climb) Order (Northern Ireland) 2016
207 (C. 14)	The Education (1998 Order) (Commencement No.8) Order (Northern Ireland) 2016
208	The Social Security, Child Support and Mesothelioma Lump Sum Payments (Decisions and Appeals) (Amendment) Regulations (Northern Ireland) 2016
209	The Road Races (Drumhorc Hill Climb) Order (Northern Ireland) 2016
210	The Road Races (Spamount Hill Climb) Order (Northern Ireland) 2016
211 (C. 15)	The Education (1998 Order) (Commencement No.9) Order (Northern Ireland) 2016
212 (C. 16)	The Environmental Better Regulation (2016 Act) (Commencement No. 1) Order (Northern Ireland) 2016
213	The Road Races (North West 200) Order (Northern Ireland) 2016
214	The Parking and Waiting Restrictions (Belfast) Order (Northern Ireland) 2016
215 (C. 17)	The Welfare Reform (Northern Ireland) Order 2015 (Commencement No. 3) Order 2016
216	The Universal Credit Regulations (Northern Ireland) 2016
217	The Personal Independence Payment Regulations (Northern Ireland) 2016
218	The Jobseeker's Allowance Regulations (Northern Ireland) 2016
219	The Employment and Support Allowance Regulations (Northern Ireland) 2016
220	The Universal Credit, Personal Independence Payment, Jobseeker's Allowance and Employment and Support Allowance (Claims and Payments) Regulations (Northern Ireland) 2016
221	The Universal Credit, Personal Independence Payment, Jobseeker's Allowance and Employment and Support Allowance (Decisions and Appeals) Regulations (Northern Ireland) 2016
222	The Universal Credit Housing Costs (Executive Determinations) Regulations (Northern Ireland) 2016
223	The Social Security (Payments on Account of Benefit) Regulations (Northern Ireland) 2016
224	The Social Security (Overpayments and Recovery) Regulations (Northern Ireland) 2016
225	The Social Security (Loss of Benefit) (Amendment) Regulations (Northern Ireland) 2016
226	The Universal Credit (Transitional Provisions) Regulations (Northern Ireland) 2016
227	The Personal Independence Payment (Transitional Provisions) Regulations (Northern Ireland) 2016
228	The Personal Independence Payment (Supplementary Provisions and Consequential Amendments) Regulations (Northern Ireland) 2016
229	The Social Security (Disability Living Allowance, Attendance Allowance and Carer's Allowance) (Amendment) Regulations (Northern Ireland) 2016
230	The Housing Benefit (Miscellaneous Amendments) Regulations (Northern Ireland) 2016
231	The Road Races (Mourne Rally) Order (Northern Ireland) 2016
232	The Road Races (Cairncastle Hill Climb) Order (Northern Ireland) 2016
233	The Jobseeker's Allowance (Extended Period of Sickness) (Amendment) Regulations (Northern Ireland) 2016
234 (C. 18)	The Welfare Reform (Northern Ireland) Order 2015 (Commencement No. 4) Order 2016
235	The Social Security (Disability Living Allowance and Personal Independence Payment) (Amendment) Regulations (Northern Ireland) 2016
236	The Universal Credit (Consequential, Supplementary, Incidental and Miscellaneous Provisions) Regulations (Northern Ireland) 2016
237	Not Allocated
238	The Industrial Injuries Benefit (Employment Training Schemes and Courses) Regulations (Northern Ireland) 2016
239	The Industrial Injuries Benefit (Injuries arising before 5 July 1948) Regulations (Northern Ireland) 2016
240	The Employment and Support Allowance (Sanctions) (Amendment) Regulations (Northern Ireland) 2016
241	The Jobseeker's Allowance (Sanctions) (Amendment) Regulations (Northern Ireland) 2016
242	The Posted Workers (Enforcement of Employment Rights) Regulations (Northern Ireland) 2016
243	The Industrial Training Levy (Construction Industry) Order (Northern Ireland) 2016
244	The Seed Marketing Regulations (Northern Ireland) 2016
245	The Proceeds of Crime Act (Appeals under Part 4) (Amendment) Order (Northern Ireland) 2016
246	Not Allocated
247 (C. 19)	The Justice (2015 Act) (Commencement No. 6) Order (Northern Ireland) 2016
248 (C. 20)	The Justice (2016 Act) (Commencement No. 1) Order (Northern Ireland) 2016
249	The Food Information (Amendment) Regulations (Northern Ireland) 2016
250	The Welfare Supplementary Payment (Loss of Disability Living Allowance) Regulations (Northern Ireland) 2016
251	The Food Safety (Information and Compositional Requirements) Regulations (Northern Ireland) 2016
252	The Renewables Obligation Closure (No.2) Order (Northern Ireland) 2016
253	The Welfare Supplementary Payment (Loss of Carer Payments) Regulations (Northern Ireland) 2016
254	The Welfare Supplementary Payment (Loss of Disability-Related Premiums) Regulations (Northern Ireland) 2016
255	The Registered Rents (Increase) Order (Northern Ireland) 2016
256	The Road Races (Armoy Motorcycle Race) Order (Northern Ireland) 2016
257	The Landlord Registration Scheme (Amendment) Regulations (Northern Ireland) 2016
258	The Housing Benefit (Amendment) Regulations (Northern Ireland) 2016 (revoked)
259	The Plant Health (Amendment) Order (Northern Ireland) 2016
260	The Road Races (Garron Point Hill Climb) Order (Northern Ireland) 2016
261	The Road Races (Eagles Rock Hill Climb) Order (Northern Ireland) 2016
262	The One-Way Traffic (Belfast) (Amendment) Order (Northern Ireland) 2016
263	The Bus Lanes (Divis Street and Falls Road, Belfast – Between Millfield and Grosvenor Road) Order (Northern Ireland) 2016
264	The Parking and Waiting Restrictions (Belfast) (Amendment) Order (Northern Ireland) 2016
265	Not Allocated
266	The Control of Electromagnetic Fields at Work Regulations (Northern Ireland) 2016
267	The Railways (Safety Management) (Amendment) Regulations (Northern Ireland) 2016
268	The Juries (Amendment) Regulations (Northern Ireland) 2016
269	The Fair Employment (Specification of Public Authorities) (Amendment) Order (Northern Ireland) 2016
270	The Discretionary Support Regulations (Northern Ireland) 2016
271	The Roads (Speed Limit) Order (Northern Ireland) 2016
272	The Roads (Speed Limit) (No. 2) Order (Northern Ireland) 2016
273	The Parking Places (Disabled Persons’ Vehicles) (Amendment) Order (Northern Ireland) 2016
274	The Care Tribunal (Amendment) Regulations (Northern Ireland) 2016
275	The Road Races (Ulster Grand Prix Bike Week) Order (Northern Ireland) 2016
276	The Waiting Restrictions (Millisle) Order (Northern Ireland) 2016
277	The Waiting Restrictions (Lambeg) Order (Northern Ireland) 2016
278	The One-Way Traffic (Ballyclare) Order (Northern Ireland) 2016
279	The Waiting Restrictions (Templepatrick) Order (Northern Ireland) 2016
280	The Parking and Waiting Restrictions (Newtownards) Order (Northern Ireland) 2016
281	The One-Way Traffic (Omagh) Order (Northern Ireland) 2016
282	The Prohibition of U-Turn (A3 Northway, Portadown) Order (Northern Ireland) 2016
283	The Prohibition of Right-Hand Turn (Carrickfergus) Order (Northern Ireland) 2016
284	The Parking Places and Waiting Restrictions (Moy) Order (Northern Ireland) 2016
285	The Parking and Waiting Restrictions (Londonderry) (Amendment No. 2) Order (Northern Ireland) 2016
286	The Parking and Waiting Restrictions (Dungannon) (Amendment) Order (Northern Ireland) 2016
287	The Parking and Waiting Restrictions (Belfast) (Amendment No. 2) Order (Northern Ireland) 2016
288	The Parking and Waiting Restrictions (Banbridge) (Amendment No. 2) Order (Northern Ireland) 2016
289	The Parking Places, Loading Bays and Waiting Restrictions (Portadown) (Amendment) Order (Northern Ireland) 2016
290	The Road Races (Ulster Rally) Order (Northern Ireland) 2016
291	The Donaghadee (Harbour Area) Order (Northern Ireland) 2016
292	The Parking and Waiting Restrictions (Lurgan) (Amendment) Order (Northern Ireland) 2016
293	The Prohibition of Waiting (Schools) (Amendment) Order (Northern Ireland) 2016
294	The Licensing (Designation of Outdoor Stadia) Regulations (Northern Ireland) 2016
295	The Licensing (Form of Licence) (Amendment) Regulations (Northern Ireland) 2016
296	The Licensing (Designation of Outdoor Stadia) (No.2) Regulations (Northern Ireland) 2016
297	The Crown Court (Amendment) Rules (Northern Ireland) 2016
298	The Crown Court (Criminal Procedure and Investigations Act 1996) (Tainted Acquittals) (Amendment) Rules (Northern Ireland) 2016
299	The Rules of the Court of Judicature (Northern Ireland) (Amendment) 2016
300	The County Court (Miscellaneous Amendments) Rules (Northern Ireland) 2016

== 301–400 ==
Number	Title
301	The Family Proceedings (Amendment) Rules (Northern Ireland) 2016
302	The County Court (Amendment) Rules (Northern Ireland) 2016
303	The Magistrates’ Courts (Miscellaneous Amendments) Rules (Northern Ireland) 2016
304	The Magistrates’ Courts (Amendment No. 2) Rules (Northern Ireland) 2016
305	The Cycle Routes (Amendment) Order (Northern Ireland) 2016
306	The Parking and Waiting Restrictions (Carrickfergus) Order (Northern Ireland) 2016
307	The Taxi Buses (Belfast) Order (Northern Ireland) 2016
308	The Control of Traffic (Armagh) Order (Northern Ireland) 2016
309	The Pollution Prevention and Control (Industrial Emissions) (Amendment) Regulations (Northern Ireland) 2016
310	The Housing Benefit (Abolition of the Family Premium and date of claim) (Amendment) Regulations (Northern Ireland) 2016
311	The Road Races (Knockagh Hill Climb) Order (Northern Ireland) 2016
312 (C. 21)	The Financial Provisions (2014 Act) (Commencement No. 3) Order (Northern Ireland) 2016
313	The Food Hygiene Rating Regulations (Northern Ireland) 2016
314	The Food Hygiene Rating (Transitional Provisions) Order (Northern Ireland) 2016
315	The Hybrid Schemes Quality Requirements (Amendment) Rules (Northern Ireland) 2016
316	The Employers’ Duties (Implementation) (Amendment) Regulations (Northern Ireland) 2016
317	The Justice Act (Northern Ireland) 2015 (Single Jurisdiction) (Consequential Amendments and Revocations) Order (Northern Ireland) 2016
318	The Gilpinstown Road (U1401), Lurgan (Abandonment) Order (Northern Ireland) 2016
319	The Road Races (Down Rally) Order (Northern Ireland) 2016
320	The Rann Road / Annacloy Road, Downpatrick (Abandonment) Order (Northern Ireland) 2016
321	The Wandsworth Court, Belfast (Abandonment) Order (Northern Ireland) 2016
322	The B122 Murley Road, Fivemiletown (Abandonment) Order (Northern Ireland) 2016
323	The old road off U1040 Lough Lane, Lurgan (Abandonment) Order (Northern Ireland) 2016
324	The Fortwilliam Parade, Belfast (Abandonment) Order (Northern Ireland) 2016
325 (C. 22)	The Welfare Reform (Northern Ireland) Order 2015 (Commencement No. 5) Order 2016
326	The Housing Benefit (Amendment No. 2) Regulations (Northern Ireland) 2016
327 (C. 23)	The Special Educational Needs and Disability (2016 Act) (Commencement No. 1) Order (Northern Ireland) 2016
328 (C. 24)	The Food Hygiene Rating (2016 Act) (Commencement) Order (Northern Ireland) 2016
329	The Local Government Pension Scheme (Nursery Assistants) (Amendment) Regulations (Northern Ireland) 2016
330	The Pensions (2005 Order) (Code of Practice) (Governance and Administration of Occupational Trust-based Schemes Providing Money Purchase Benefits) (Appointed Day) Order (Northern Ireland) 2016
331 (C. 25)	The Rates (Amendment) (2016 Act) (Commencement No. 1) Order (Northern Ireland) 2016
332 (C. 26)	The Environmental Better Regulation (2016 Act) (Commencement No. 2) Order (Northern Ireland) 2016
333	The Domestic Energy Efficiency Grants (Amendment) Regulations (Northern Ireland) 2016
334	The General Dental Services (Amendment) Regulations (Northern Ireland) 2016
335	The Optical Charges and Payments (Amendment) Regulations (Northern Ireland) 2016
336	The Civil Legal Services (Remuneration) (Amendment) Order (Northern Ireland) 2016
337	The Civil Legal Services (General) (Amendment) Regulations (Northern Ireland) 2016
338	The Civil Legal Services (Financial) (Amendment) Regulations (Northern Ireland) 2016
339	The Superannuation (Northern Ireland Public Services Ombudsman) Order (Northern Ireland) 2016
340	The Public Service Pensions (Northern Ireland Public Services Ombudsman) Regulations (Northern Ireland) 2016
341	The Parking Places (Disabled Persons’ Vehicles) (Amendment No. 2) Order (Northern Ireland) 2016
342	The Loading Bays on Roads (Amendment) Order (Northern Ireland) 2016
343	The Passenger and Goods Vehicles (Tachographs) (Amendment) Regulations (Northern Ireland) 2016
344	The Public Service Vehicles (Amendment) Regulations (Northern Ireland) 2016
345	The Food Hygiene (Amendment) Regulations (Northern Ireland) 2016
346	The Carlingford Area (Definition of the Mouth of the Clanrye River) Regulations 2016
347	The Bus Lanes (Andersonstown Road and Stewartstown Road Belfast – between Finaghy Road North and Michael Ferguson Roundabout) Order (Northern Ireland) 2016
348	The Parking and Waiting Restrictions (Ballymena) (Amendment) Order (Northern Ireland) 2016
349	The Roads (Speed Limit) (No. 3) Order (Northern Ireland) 2016
350	The Motor Hackney Carriages (Bangor) Bye-Laws (Amendment) Order (Northern Ireland) 2016
351	The Parking and Waiting Restrictions (Bangor) Order (Northern Ireland) 2016
352	The Parking Places (Disabled Persons’ Vehicles) (Amendment No. 3) Order (Northern Ireland) 2016
353	The Pensions (2015 Act) (Consequential Amendments) Order (Northern Ireland) 2016
354	The Student Fees (Amounts) (Amendment) Regulations (Northern Ireland) 2016
355 (C. 27)	The Health and Personal Social Services (Quality, Improvement and Regulation) (2003 Order) (Commencement No.6 and Transitional Provisions) Order (Northern Ireland) 2016
356	The Parking and Waiting Restrictions (Belfast) (Amendment No. 3) Order (Northern Ireland) 2016
357	The Parking and Waiting Restrictions (Dungannon) (Amendment No. 2) Order (Northern Ireland) 2016
358	The Parking and Waiting Restrictions (Carrickfergus) (Amendment) Order (Northern Ireland) 2016
359	The Rates (Increased Reduction for Recreational Hereditaments) Regulations (Northern Ireland) 2016
360	The Parking and Waiting Restrictions (Londonderry) (Amendment No. 3) Order (Northern Ireland) 2016
361	The Parking and Waiting Restrictions (Belfast) (Amendment No. 4) Order (Northern Ireland) 2016
362	The Waiting Restrictions (Dundonald) (Amendment) Order (Northern Ireland) 2016
363	The Prohibition of U-Turn (A26 Lisnevenagh Road, Kells) Order (Northern Ireland) 2016
364	The Gas (Designation of Pipelines) Order (Northern Ireland) 2016
365	The Remuneration of the Chairman of the Northern Ireland Medical and Dental Training Agency Regulations (Northern Ireland) 2016
366	The Making Available on the Market and Supervision of Transfers of Explosives Regulations (Northern Ireland) 2016
367	The Parking and Waiting Restrictions (Mossley) Order (Northern Ireland) 2016
368	The Bus Lanes Order (Amendment) Order (Northern Ireland) 2016
369	The Insolvency (Northern Ireland) Order 1989 (Amendment) Order (Northern Ireland) 2016
370	The Derriaghy Road, Lisburn (Abandonment) Order (Northern Ireland) 2016
371	The A1 Hillsborough Road (between Hillsborough Roundabout and Pantridge Link), Hillsborough (Stopping-Up) Order (Northern Ireland) 2016
372	The Route F1403 Footpath between Ashdene Park, Taghnevan and Tullygally East Road, Craigavon (Abandonment) Order (Northern Ireland) 2016
373	The Sexual Offences Act 2003 (Prescribed Police Stations) Regulations (Northern Ireland) 2016 (revoked)
374 (C. 28)	The Welfare Reform and Work (Northern Ireland) Order 2016 (Commencement No. 1) Order 2016
375	The Benefit Cap (Housing Benefit and Universal Credit) (Amendment) Regulations (Northern Ireland) 2016
376	The Social Security (Expenses of Paying Sums in Relation to Vehicle Hire) Regulations (Northern Ireland) 2016
377	The County Court (Amendment No. 2) Rules (Northern Ireland) 2016
378	The Richmond Crescent, Bangor (Abandonment) Order (Northern Ireland) 2016
379	The Belfast Road, Carrickfergus (Part-Time 20 mph Speed Limit) Order (Northern Ireland) 2016
380	The Cycle Routes (Amendment No. 2) Order (Northern Ireland) 2016
381	The Parking and Waiting Restrictions (Newtownabbey) (Amendment) Order (Northern Ireland) 2016
382	The Church Street / Mullagh Road, Maghera (Abandonment) Order (Northern Ireland) 2016
383	The Baronscourt Lane, Carryduff (Abandonment) Order (Northern Ireland) 2016
384	The Health and Personal Social Services (Superannuation), Health and Social Care (Pension Schemes) (Amendment) Regulations (Northern Ireland) 2016
385	Not Allocated
386	The Attorney General's Human Rights Guidance (Cooperation and Operational Independence) Order (Northern Ireland) 2016
387 (C. 29)	The Justice (2015 Act) (Commencement No. 7 and Saving Provisions) Order (Northern Ireland) 2016
388 (C. 30)	The Rates (Amendment) (2016 Act) (Commencement No. 2) Order (Northern Ireland) 2016
389	The Welfare Supplementary Payment (Benefit Cap) Regulations (Northern Ireland) 2016
390	The Child Support (Deduction from Earnings Orders, Amendment and Modification and Miscellaneous Amendments) Regulations (Northern Ireland) 2016
391	The Further Education (Governing Body of Institution of Further Education) Order (Northern Ireland) 2016
392	The Groganstown Road, Belfast (Abandonment) Order (Northern Ireland) 2016
393	The Social Security (Great Britain Reciprocal Arrangements) (Amendment) Regulations (Northern Ireland) 2016
394	The Public Use of the Records (Management and Fees) Rules (Northern Ireland) 2016
395	The Energy Performance of Buildings (Certificates and Inspections) (Amendment) Regulations (Northern Ireland) 2016
396	The Civil Legal Services (Remuneration) (Amendment) (No. 2) Order (Northern Ireland) 2016
397	The Legal Aid for Crown Court Proceedings (Costs) (Amendment No. 3) Rules (Northern Ireland) 2016
398	The Magistrates’ Courts and County Court Appeals (Criminal Legal Aid) (Costs) (Amendment) Rules (Northern Ireland) 2016
399 (C. 31)	The Road Traffic (Amendment) (2016 Act) (Commencement No. 1) Order (Northern Ireland) 2016
400	The Juries Regulations (Amendment) Order (Northern Ireland) 2016

=== 401–436 ===
Number	Title
401	The Waste (Fees and Charges) (Amendment) Regulations (Northern Ireland) 2016
402	The Level Crossing (Bellarena) Order (Northern Ireland) 2016
403	The Level Crossing (Castlerock) Order (Northern Ireland) 2016
404	The Level Crossing (Coleraine (Bushmills Road)) Order (Northern Ireland) 2016
405	The Magistrates’ Courts (Licensing) (Amendment) Rules (Northern Ireland) 2016
406	The Offshore Installations (Offshore Safety Directive) (Safety Case etc.) Regulations (Northern Ireland) 2016
407	The Human Medicines (Amendment) Regulations 2016
408	The Rathlin Island (Prohibited Methods of Fishing) Regulations (Northern Ireland) 2016 (revoked)
409	The Social Security (Credits, and Crediting and Treatment of Contributions) (Consequential and Miscellaneous Amendments) Regulations (Northern Ireland) 2016
410	The Human Trafficking and Exploitation (Criminal Justice and Support for Victims) (Independent Guardian) Regulations (Northern Ireland) 2016
411 (C. 32)	The Welfare Reform (Northern Ireland) Order 2015 (Commencement No. 6 and Saving Provision) Order 2016
412	The Building (Amendment) Regulations (Northern Ireland) 2016
413	The Police Service of Northern Ireland (Promotion) (Amendment) Regulations 2016
414	The Motor Vehicles (Wearing of Seat Belts) (Amendment) Regulations (Northern Ireland) 2016 (revoked)
415	The Caseins and Caseinates Regulations (Northern Ireland) 2016
416	The Civil Legal Services (Scope) (No. 2) Regulations (Northern Ireland) 2016
417 (C. 33)	The Justice (2015 Act) (Commencement No.8) Order (Northern Ireland) 2016
418	The Insolvency (Monetary Limits) (Amendment) Order (Northern Ireland) 2016
419	The State Pension Revaluation for Transitional Pensions Order (Northern Ireland) 2016
420	The Railways Infrastructure (Access, Management and Licensing of Railway Undertakings) Regulations (Northern Ireland) 2016
421	The Parking Places (Disabled Persons’ Vehicles) (Amendment No. 4) Order (Northern Ireland) 2016
422	The Water Meters Regulations (Northern Ireland) 2016
423	The Occupational Pensions (Revaluation) Order (Northern Ireland) 2016
424 (C. 34)	The Justice (2011 Act) (Commencement No.9) Order (Northern Ireland) 2016
425	The Food Hygiene Rating (Fee and Fixed Penalty Amount) Order (Northern Ireland) 2016
426	The Court of Judicature Fees (Amendment) Order (Northern Ireland) 2016
427	The Mines Regulations (Northern Ireland) 2016
428	The Waiting Restrictions (Ballynure) Order (Northern Ireland) 2016
429	The Roads (Speed Limit) (No. 4) Order (Northern Ireland) 2016
430	The Parking and Waiting Restrictions (Belfast) (Amendment No. 5) Order (Northern Ireland) 2016
431	The Victim Statement Regulations (Northern Ireland) 2016
432	The Social Security (Miscellaneous Amendments) Regulations (Northern Ireland) 2016
433	The Bus Lanes Orders (Amendment) Order (Northern Ireland) 2016
434	The Parking and Waiting Restrictions (Belfast) (Amendment No. 6) Order (Northern Ireland) 2016
435	The Waiting Restrictions (Saintfield) Order (Northern Ireland) 2016
436 (C. 35)	The Justice (2015 Act) (Commencement No.9) Order (Northern Ireland) 2016

== See also ==
- List of acts of the Northern Ireland Assembly from 2016
- List of acts of the Parliament of the United Kingdom from 2016
