= Pat Cullen =

Northern Irish politician and nurse (born 1965)

Pat Cullen MP
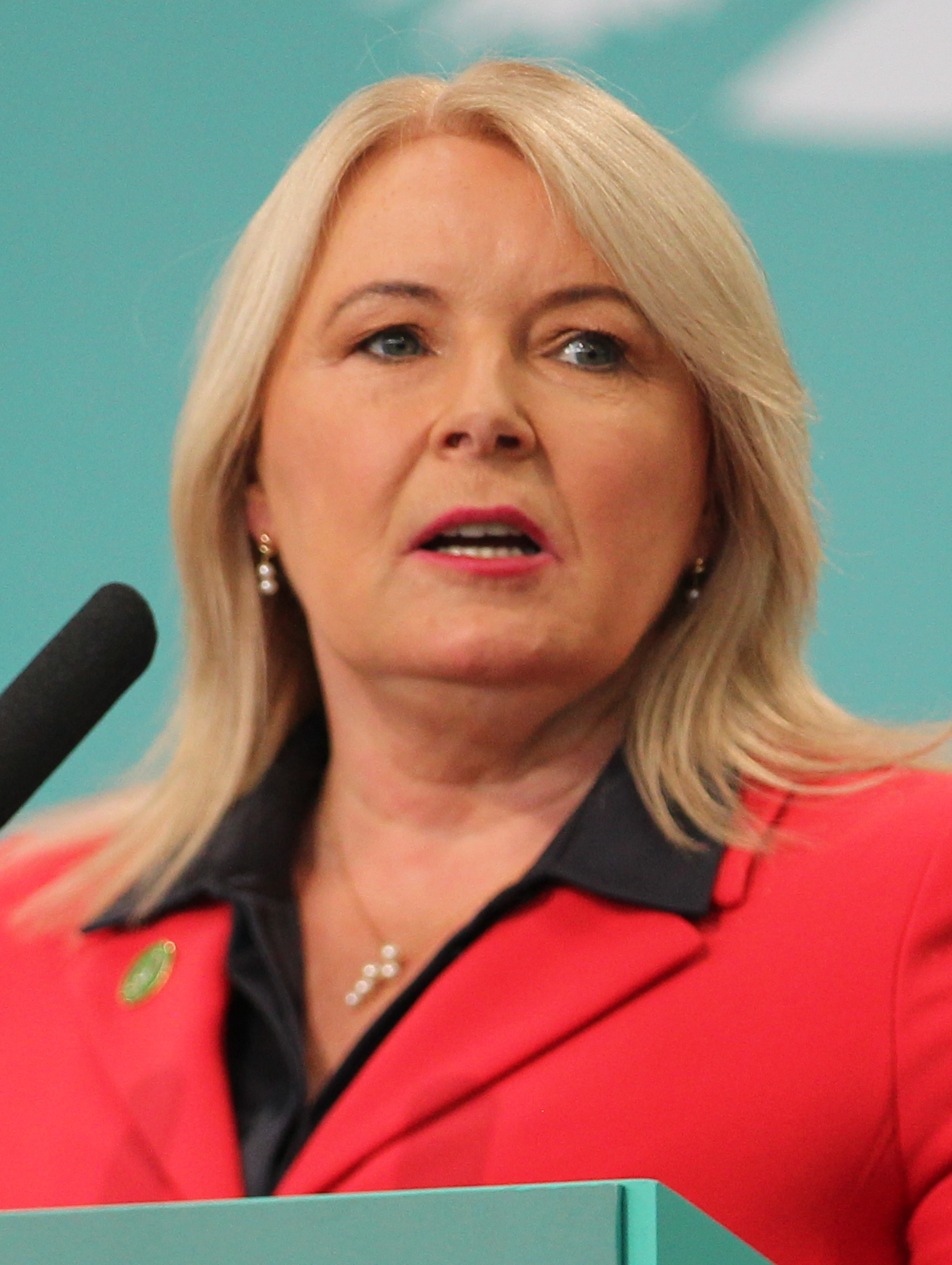
- Cullen in 2024

Member of Parliament for Fermanagh and South Tyrone
- Incumbent
- Assumed office 4 July 2024
- Preceded by: Michelle Gildernew
- Majority: 4,571 (8.9%)

Personal details
- Born: Patricia Yvonne McAleer; 2 June 1965 (age 61) Carrickmore, County Tyrone, Northern Ireland
- Party: Sinn Féin
- Spouse: Enda Cullen
- Children: 2
- Occupation: Politician; Trade unionist
- Profession: Nurse

Patricia Yvonne Cullen (née McAleer; born 2 June 1965) is an Irish Sinn Féin politician, trade unionist and nurse who has served as Member of Parliament (MP) for Fermanagh and South Tyrone since 2024. Cullen was the Chief Executive and General Secretary of the Royal College of Nursing from July 2021 to May 2024.

== Early life ==
Cullen was born Patricia Yvonne McAleer in Carrickmore, County Tyrone, the youngest of seven children born to farmer Paddy McAleer and his wife, Annie. The decision of the eldest sister, Birdie, to become a nurse inspired Pat to follow the same career. Her brother and four of her five sisters all became nurses. Pat's other sister had a learning disability, which prompted Pat to study mental health nursing.

== Career ==
Cullen worked as a community nurse in west Belfast during the Troubles. During a period as a nurse trainee at Holywell Hospital in Antrim when she was 18, Cullen wrote a letter of complaint to hospital management about their "token economy" policy, whereby psychiatric patients had important personal possessions confiscated as punishment for "difficult" behaviour. She succeeded in having the hospital soften the policy. She later became a registered psychotherapist. Cullen went on to hold roles at the Public Health Agency and the Health and Social Care Board, before joining the Royal College of Nursing (RCN) in 2016. In May 2019, she became director of the Northern Ireland Board of the RCN. She started acting as General Secretary and Chief Executive in April 2021, and was appointed as interim General Secretary and Chief Executive of the UK-wide RCN in July 2021.

In late 2022, she led the National Health Service strikes in which English and Welsh nurses went on strike for the first time in the nursing union's 106-year history. In April 2023, her union announced a strike on May bank holiday weekend (30 April to 2 May) after RCN members rejected the pay offer.

In 2023, Cullen was described by the New Statesman as ”one of the UKs most prominent Trade Union leaders”, being placed at No.15 in their list of the most powerful left-wing figures of the year, above many elected politicians.

In May 2024, Cullen announced she was stepping down from her role at the RCN in order to stand as a candidate for Fermanagh and South Tyrone in the 2024 United Kingdom general election. On 4 July she was elected as Sinn Féin MP for Fermanagh and South Tyrone, succeeding fellow Sinn Féin member Michelle Gildernew and increasing the party's majority from 0.1% to 8.9% of the vote. Like all Sinn Féin UK MPs, she follows an abstentionist policy and has not taken her seat in Westminster.

In October 2026, Cullen was announced as a Sinn Féin candidate for Belfast South and Mid Down at the next Northern Ireland Assembly election, alongside incumbent MLA Deirdre Hargey.

== Personal life ==
She is married to Enda Cullen, who is a general practitioner in Belfast.
