= Assembly Members (Reduction of Numbers) Act (Northern Ireland) 2016 =

- Act of the Northern Ireland Assembly
- Northern Ireland Assembly
- Long title: An Act to reduce the number of members of the Assembly returned for each constituency.
- Citation: 2016 c. 29 (N.I.)
- Introduced by: Stewart Dickson
- Territorial extent: Northern Ireland

Dates
- Royal assent: 22 July 2016
- Commencement: 2 March 2017

Status: Current legislation

Text of statute as originally enacted

Text of the Assembly Members (Reduction of Numbers) Act (Northern Ireland) 2016 as in force today (including any amendments) within the United Kingdom, from legislation.gov.uk.

The Assembly Members (Reduction of Numbers) Act (Northern Ireland) 2016 (c. 29 (N.I.)) is a 2016 act of the Northern Ireland Assembly. It provided for a reduction of Members of the Legislative Assembly (MLAs) in the Assembly from 108 to 90 for the first election following the 2016 Northern Ireland Assembly election. MLAs are elected by single transferable vote (STV), with each of Northern Ireland's 18 Westminster constituencies being used to elect multiple MLAs (six before this act and five from 2017).

== History ==
The Northern Ireland Act 1998, passed by the Parliament of the United Kingdom following the Good Friday Agreement, established the Northern Ireland Assembly and declared that each Assembly constituency would elect six members. In 2014, during consideration of the Northern Ireland (Miscellaneous Provisions) Act 2014, the House of Lords added an amendment to the bill to reduce the number of MLAs based upon popular opinion in Northern Ireland that the Northern Ireland Assembly was too large.

The Secretary of State for Northern Ireland in the House of Commons supported the amendment that provided the Assembly the power to vote to reduce itself in size providing there was sufficient cross-community support. The Democratic Unionist Party supported this and circulated a white paper proposing a reduction in MLAs and fewer departments in the Northern Ireland Executive. The deputy First Minister, Martin McGuinness supported the proposal after Sinn Féin had initially opposed the reduction.

== Passage ==
In 2015 the bill was introduced into the Northern Ireland Assembly by the Alliance Party's Stewart Dickson. It provided that the number of members elected in each of the 18 constituencies would be reduced from six to five. The bill was passed unanimously with no dissenting votes. Royal assent was granted by Queen Elizabeth II on 22 July 2016 with the intention that the bill would come into force at the next election for the Northern Ireland Assembly.

In 2017, McGuinness resigned as deputy First Minister because of Arlene Foster's decision to reject Sinn Féin's calls that she step down as First Minister, following the Renewable Heat Incentive scandal. Sinn Féin refused to nominate a successor, which caused the Northern Ireland Executive to collapse due to requiring cross-community support. Because of the collapse of the Executive, the Secretary of State for Northern Ireland, James Brokenshire, was obliged to dissolve the Assembly under the Northern Ireland Act 1998 and called a snap election to be held on 2 March 2017. As a result, the implementation of the act was brought forward. This meant the 2017 Assembly election would be the first held under the Assembly Members (Reduction of Numbers) Act (Northern Ireland) 2016, with 90 MLAs being returned instead of 108.
