= Belfast South and Mid Down (Assembly constituency) =

Constituency in the Northern Ireland Assembly

Coordinates: 54°33′53″N 5°56′16″W

- Constituency for the Northern Ireland Assembly

Current Constituency
- Created: 2027
- Seats: 5 (2027–)
- MLAs: To be elected in May 2027
- City council: Belfast City Council

Belfast South and Mid Down is a constituency in the Northern Ireland Assembly, to be first contested in the 2027 Assembly election. It replaces the Belfast South Assembly constituency which has existed since 1973.

The constituency is formed from the Belfast City Council districts of Balmoral and Botanic as well as a number of a number of wards from Lisnasharragh and Lisburn and Castlereagh, and Saintfield from Rowallane. For further details of the history and boundaries of the constituency, see Belfast South and Mid Down (UK Parliament constituency).

== Elections ==
=== Northern Ireland Assembly ===
==== 2027 ====
2027 Assembly election: Belfast South and Mid Down – 5 seats
Party	Candidate	FPv%	Count
Party	Candidate	FPv%	1
Sinn Féin	Pat Cullen		
Green (NI)	Áine Groogan		
Sinn Féin	Deirdre Hargey		
UUP	Kathryn Owen		
