= Matthew O'Toole =

Leader of the Opposition in Northern Ireland

Matthew O'Toole MLA
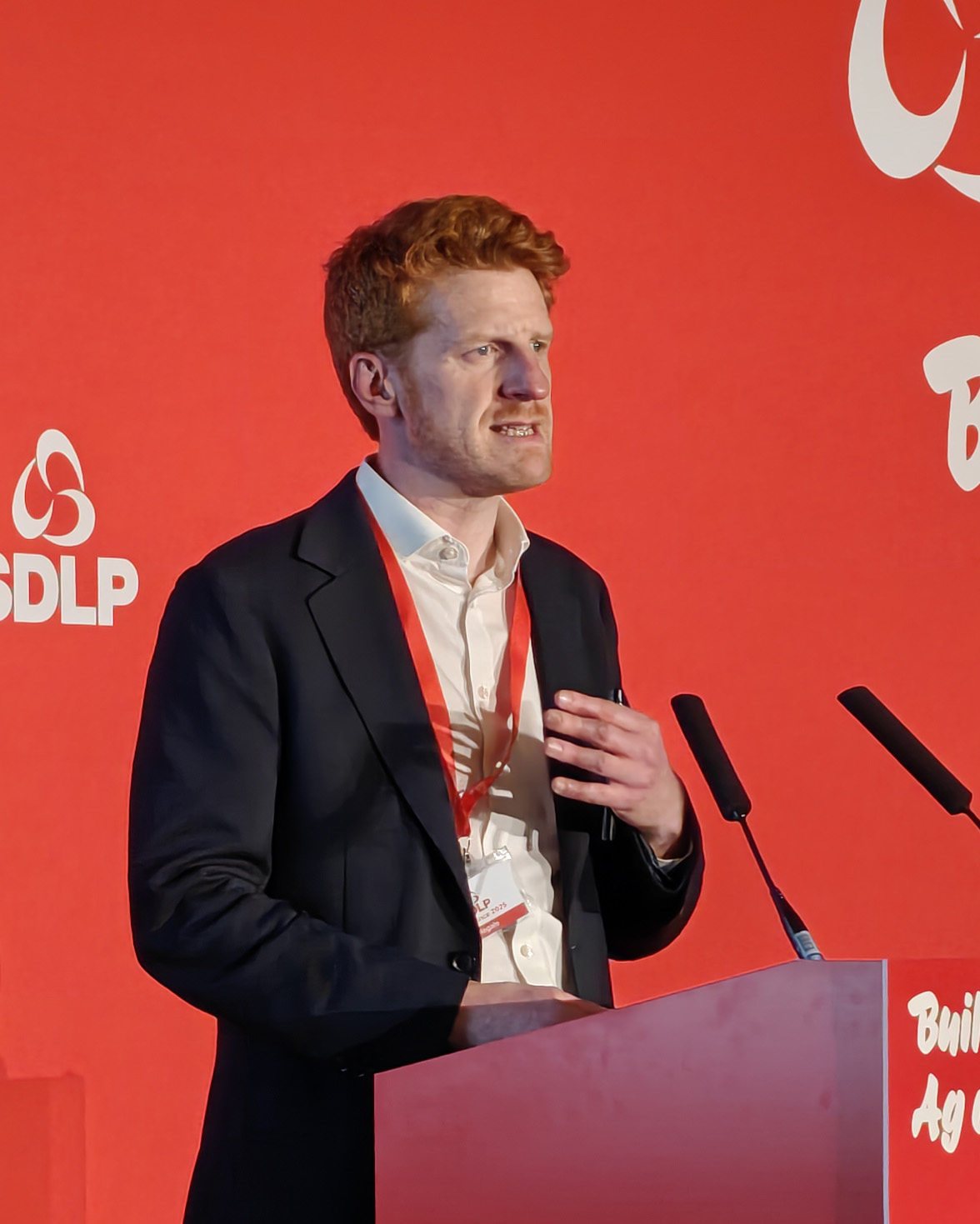

Leader of the Opposition in the Northern Ireland Assembly
- Incumbent
- Assumed office 25 July 2022
- Preceded by: Office established

Leader of the SDLP in the Northern Ireland Assembly
- Incumbent
- Assumed office 13 May 2022
- Leader: Colum Eastwood; Claire Hanna
- Preceded by: Nichola Mallon

Member of the Legislative Assembly for Belfast South
- Incumbent
- Assumed office 11 January 2020
- Preceded by: Claire Hanna

Personal details
- Born: Matthew John O'Toole; 18 May 1983 (age 43) Belfast, County Antrim, Northern Ireland
- Party: Social Democratic and Labour Party
- Relations: Mark Durkan (uncle); Mark H. Durkan (cousin)

Matthew John O'Toole MLA (born 18 May 1983) is an Irish politician, former civil servant, and journalist, serving as leader of the opposition since 2022, and a Member of the Northern Ireland Assembly (MLA) for Belfast South since 2020.

== Early life and career ==
Born in Belfast, O'Toole grew up in Downpatrick and read for an MA in International Relations and English at the University of St Andrews.

Prior to serving as an MLA, O'Toole worked as a journalist, and as a civil servant at HM Treasury and in 10 Downing Street. At Downing Street, O'Toole worked on the 2016 EU referendum and its aftermath. On leaving the civil service, O'Toole wrote widely on Brexit, its impact on Northern Ireland, and British-Irish relations. His writing has appeared in the Irish Times, Guardian, Financial Times, Politico, New Statesman and elsewhere. From 2017 to 2020, he was a senior consultant at Powerscourt, a communications consultancy based in London.

== Political career ==
O'Toole was co-opted into the Northern Ireland Assembly on 11 January 2020, replacing Claire Hanna who had been elected as MP for the constituency in the previous general election. Upon the restoration of devolution, O'Toole was appointed the SDLP's spokesperson for Brexit and Public Finance, sitting on the Finance and Public Accounts Committees.

During his time in the Assembly O'Toole has advocated for the rights of journalists in Northern Ireland. In December 2020, he founded and became chair of the All Party Group on Press Freedom and Media Sustainability.

O’Toole has also been vocal of the negative impact of the “brain drain” to Northern Ireland. In July 2021 he proposed the “Make Change Programme”, an initiative to encourage young people to take jobs in the civil service, either through apprenticeships or through graduate programmes. It also intends to address what he sees as a looming workforce crisis in the civil service, with 1% of staff being under 25 and 80% of senior staff being over 50.

During a reshuffle in October 2021, O’Toole gained the responsibility of Economy Spokesperson and was appointed vice-chair of the Economy Committee.

O'Toole was selected as one of two SDLP candidates to contest the 2022 Northern Ireland Assembly election in Belfast South, alongside running mate Elsie Trainor. He was re-elected with 5,394 first preference votes.

=== Brexit and the NI Protocol ===
As the SDLP's Brexit Spokesperson, in June 2020 O'Toole proposed a successful motion in the NI Assembly calling on the British Government to extend the Brexit transition period beyond 1 January 2021, describing any decision to not do so as "mad and dangerous" given the economic conditions caused by the COVID-19 pandemic.

O’Toole has been vocal on the opportunities provided by the Northern Ireland Protocol, and the effect it has had in shielding Northern Ireland from some of the worst effects of Brexit. Particularly of interest is the increase in North-South trade and O’Toole’s promotion of the “dual-market access” to both the UK and EU markets that the Protocol provides.

O’Toole has also spoken on the financial cost of leaving the European Union on public finances, expressing concern at the “devastating” loss of £100m EU funding for the Department for the Economy.

Highlighting the SDLP’s position on the issue, O’Toole spoke at their annual conference in 2023 of the “one viable route back into the EU for the North and it is via a new Ireland”.

=== New Ireland Commission ===
The SDLP launched the “Expert Reference” panel of its New Ireland Commission in May 2021, which was convened by O’Toole. It included a broad range of panellists from across Northern Ireland to examine the potential shape of public and health services, the economy, and education in a united Ireland.

Since the Commission was launched in 2021 O’Toole and other SDLP representatives held private engagement sessions with ethnic minorities, trade unions, political parties, public service leaders and most notably having a “specific focus on private conversations with unionist communities”.

The SDLP moved into the public phase of the Commission’s work in March 2023 with the publication of a document containing their six core principles entitled “How to Build an Inclusive New Ireland”. Speaking during its launch O’Toole was quoted as saying “For the SDLP, building a new Ireland is the greatest opportunity to reconcile our people, maximise opportunity for every community and create something that is truly new, shared and better than what we currently live with.”

=== Leader of the Opposition ===
The SDLP returned with 8 seats in the May 2022 Assembly election, and did not nominate a replacement for Nichola Mallon as interim Minister for Infrastructure, instead choosing to form a "constructive opposition". On 25 July SDLP Leader Colum Eastwood announced that the party would be formally taking up the role of Official Opposition in the Northern Ireland Assembly, with O'Toole serving as its first Leader of the Opposition, as well as the spokesperson on the Cost of Living Crisis.

After becoming nominal Leader of the Opposition, O'Toole helped recall Stormont in December 2022 and nominated party colleague Patsy McGlone to the role of Speaker, which failed to pass a cross community vote, despite more than 70% of MLAs voting to support McGlone's nomination. In response, O'Toole proposed amending the procedure to elect the Speaker, allowing for a two-thirds majority in addition to the existing criteria.

O'Toole has also used his position to raise concerns regarding the delivery of the UK Government's energy payment, due to help those struggling to pay for utilities during the Winter of 2022. The SDLP subsequently proposed delivering 1,000 litres home heating oil, which would have proportionally matched the support given to those in England.

Following the announcement from the Secretary of State of sharp budget cuts across Northern Ireland departments in April 2023 O'Toole presented proposals for delivering a public service "triple lock" to ensure a more sustainable approach to public finances. The proposals included a commitment that no budget cuts can be implemented without the consent of Northern Ireland's devolved government, legislation to beef up the powers of the NI Fiscal Council to monitor the performance of the NI Executive, and to deliver on further fiscal devolution as recommended by the NI Fiscal Commission.

Northern Ireland Assembly
Vacant Eddie McAteer (in House of Commons)	Leader of the Opposition; 2022–present	Incumbent
Preceded by Claire Hanna	MLA for Belfast South; 2020–present	Incumbent
