= Leader of the Opposition (Northern Ireland) =

Leader of the Opposition of the Northern Ireland Assembly
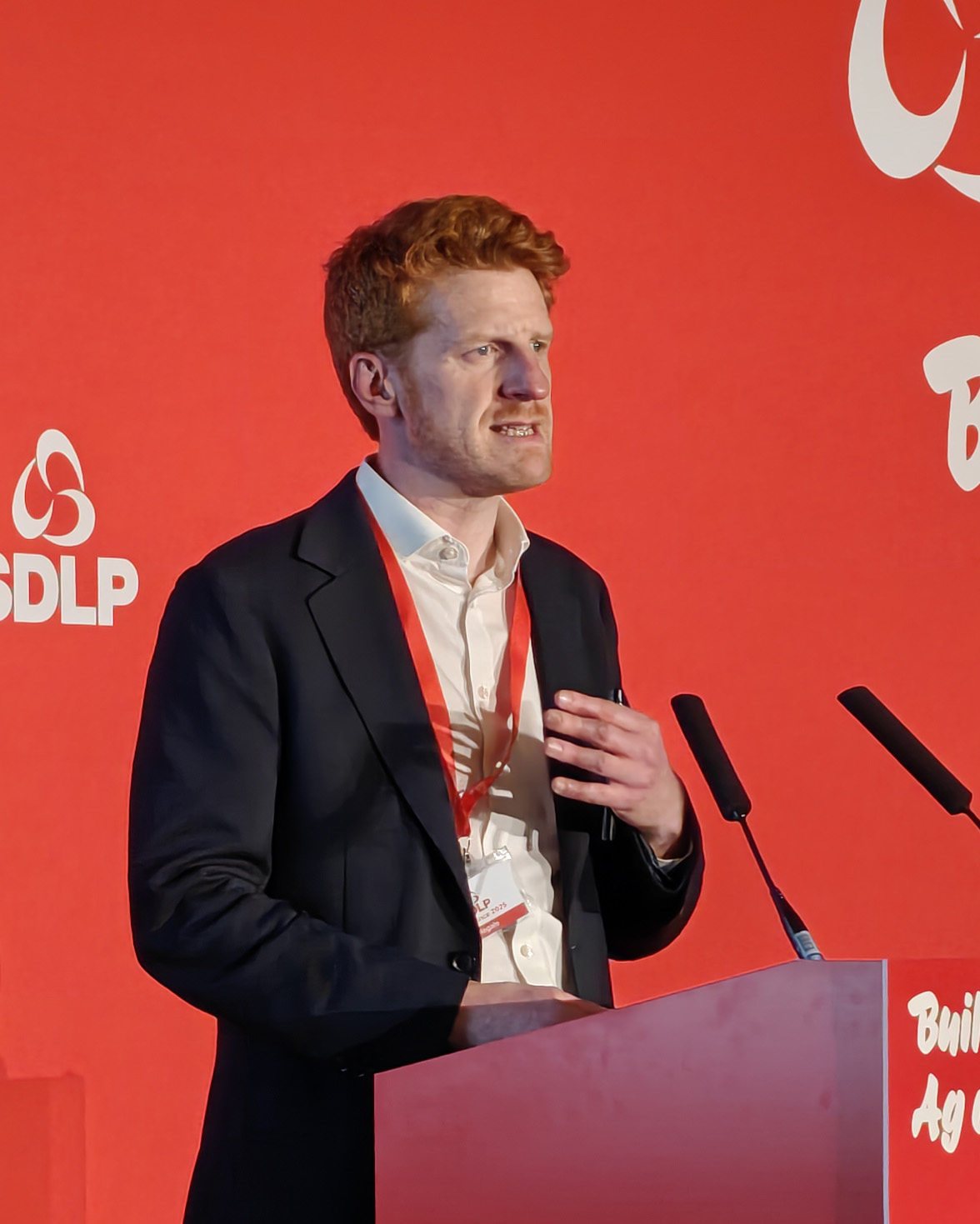
- Incumbent; Matthew O'Toole since 3 February 2024
- Reports to: Northern Ireland Assembly
- Seat: Parliament Buildings, Stormont Estate, Belfast
- Inaugural holder: Tom Boyd (1958, Parliament); Matthew O'Toole (2022, Assembly)
- Formation: 2016
- Website: www.niassembly.gov.uk

In Northern Ireland, the Leader of the Opposition is the leader of the largest eligible political party in the Northern Ireland Assembly that is not in the Northern Ireland Executive. The position is currently held by Matthew O'Toole of the Social Democratic and Labour Party.

== Parliament of Northern Ireland ==
From the establishment of the Parliament of Northern Ireland in 1921, the Nationalist Party were consistently the largest non-government party; however, they intermittently practised a policy of abstentionism and did not formally adopt the mantle of Official Opposition. Various Nationalist, Labour and Independent Unionist politicians performed an opposition role without any formal recognition.

After the 1958 election the Northern Ireland Labour Party won four seats and were asked by the Speaker to form the Official Opposition. Tom Boyd was appointed the first Leader of the Opposition.

In February 1965 the Nationalists decided that they would form the Official Opposition for the first time, and appointed their leader, Eddie McAteer, as Leader of the Opposition. He served in this role until October 1968 when the party withdrew from Stormont in response to the Government's response to the RUC's attack on a NICRA march in Derry.

From 1968 until the prorogation of the Parliament no other party agreed to form the Official Opposition and therefore no Leader of the Opposition was appointed.

== Northern Ireland Assembly ==
When the Northern Ireland Assembly and Executive were established in 1998 and 1999 respectively, all eligible parties were required to nominate ministers to serve on the Executive. No provision for an Official Opposition or for the role of Leader of the Opposition was made. Non-Executive parties continued to fulfil the role of an opposition in an unofficial capacity, much as various Nationalist and Labour MPs had done in the House of Commons.

Assembly and Executive Reform (Assembly Opposition) Act (Northern Ireland) 2016
- Act of the Northern Ireland Assembly
- Northern Ireland Assembly
- Long title: An Act to provide for the formation of an Assembly Opposition; to provide for the passing of an Assembly and Executive Transfer of Responsibilities Motion; and to reform the Assembly and the Executive.
- Citation: 2016 c. 10 (N.I.)
- Introduced by: John McCallister MLA

Dates
- Royal assent: 23 March 2016

Status: Current legislation

History of passage through the Assembly

Text of statute as originally enacted

Text of the Assembly and Executive Reform (Assembly Opposition) Act (Northern Ireland) 2016 as in force today (including any amendments) within the United Kingdom, from legislation.gov.uk.

The Assembly and Executive Reform (Assembly Opposition) Act (Northern Ireland) 2016 (c. 10 (N.I.)) established provisions which allowed for a creation of an Official Opposition, with certain rights and entitlements associated with the role. The Official Opposition asks the first topical question at Question Time in the Assembly and responds first to ministerial statements.Assembly standing orders subsequently made provision for the creation of a “Leader of the Opposition” and “Deputy Leader of the Opposition”, to be nominated by the largest and second-largest parties which are entitled to membership of the Official Opposition. After the 2016 election the UUP and SDLP decided to form the Official Opposition. However, neither party opted to nominate individuals to the roles of Leader and Deputy Leader.

Following the SDLP declining to nominate an Infrastructure Minister to the Executive, on the 25 July 2022 the SDLP formed an opposition and nominated Matthew O’Toole as the first Leader of the Opposition in the Northern Ireland Assembly. In addition, other SDLP MLAs were appointed to act as spokespeople on various portfolios.

At an Ulster University event entitled 'Creating a Culture of Accountability: Lessons from a Year in Opposition', O'Toole reflected on potential reforms to Opposition mechanisms in the Assembly. O'Toole has also called for mechanisms to hold the Speaker of the Assembly to account.

== List of Leaders of the Opposition ==
=== Parties ===
Northern Ireland Labour Party
Nationalist Party
Social Democratic and Labour Party

| Leader of the Opposition | | | | Body |
| Name (Birth–Death) Constituency | Portrait | Term of office | | Body |
|---|---|---|---|---|
| Office vacant | | | | 1st Parliament |
| Office vacant | | | | 2nd Parliament |
| Office vacant | | | | 3rd Parliament |
| Office vacant | | | | 4th Parliament |
| Office vacant | | | | 5th Parliament |
| Office vacant | | | | 6th Parliament |
| Office vacant | | | | 7th Parliament |
| Office vacant | | | | 8th Parliament |
| Tom Boyd (1903–1991); Belfast Pottinger | | 5 April 1958 | 2 February 1965 | 9th Parliament |
| Tom Boyd (1903–1991); Belfast Pottinger | | 5 April 1958 | 2 February 1965 | 10th Parliament |
| Eddie McAteer (1914–1986); Foyle | | 2 February 1965 | 15 October 1968 | 10th Parliament |
| Eddie McAteer (1914–1986); Foyle | | 2 February 1965 | 15 October 1968 | 11th Parliament |
| Office vacant | | | | 11th Parliament |
| Office vacant | | | | 12th Parliament |
| Office abolished | | | | 1973 Assembly |
| Office abolished | | | | Constitutional Convention |
| Office abolished | | | | 1982 Assembly |
| Office abolished | | | | Forum |
| Office abolished | | | | 1st Assembly |
| Office abolished | | | | 2nd Assembly |
| Office abolished | | | | 3rd Assembly |
| Office abolished | | | | 4th Assembly |
| Office vacant | | | | 5th Assembly |
| Office vacant | | | | 6th Assembly |
| Office vacant | | | | 7th Assembly |
| Matthew O'Toole (b. 1983); Belfast South | | 25 July 2022 | 27 October 2022 | 7th Assembly |
| Office vacant | | | | 7th Assembly |
| Matthew O'Toole (b. 1983); Belfast South | | 3 February 2024 | Incumbent | 7th Assembly |

== See also ==
- Parliament of Northern Ireland
- Government of Northern Ireland
- Northern Ireland Assembly
- Northern Ireland Executive
- Northern Ireland Assembly Opposition
