= List of acts of the Northern Ireland Assembly from 2016 =

This is a list of acts of the Northern Ireland Assembly passed in 2016. Acts of the Northern Ireland Assembly are enacted by the Northern Ireland Assembly, which has legislative authority over devolved matters in relation to Northern Ireland under the authority of the Northern Ireland Act 1998. Acts are cited by calendar year, in the same fashion as acts of Parliament of the United Kingdom. Each act passed in a respective year is given a chapter number (abbreviated "c.") denoted by Arabic numerals, and citations are usually followed by the suffix "(N.I.)" so as to prevent confusion with acts of Parliament of the United Kingdom.

30 acts of the Northern Ireland Assembly were passed in 2016.

indicates that an act has been transcribed on Wikisource, indicates that an act is available to view at legislation.gov.uk, and indicates the location of the original act in the Parliamentary Archives.

== Acts of the Northern Ireland Assembly ==
Short title	Citation	Royal assent
Long title
Pension Schemes Act (Northern Ireland) 2016	2016 c. 1 (N.I.)	15 January 2016
An Act to make provision about pension schemes, including provision designed to encourage arrangements that offer people different levels of certainty in retirement or that involve different ways of sharing or pooling risk.
Insolvency (Amendment) Act (Northern Ireland) 2016	2016 c. 2 (N.I.)	29 January 2016
An Act to amend the law relating to insolvency; and for connected purposes.
Food Hygiene Rating Act (Northern Ireland) 2016	2016 c. 3 (N.I.)	29 January 2016
An Act to provide for the operation of a food hygiene rating scheme in Northern Ireland.
Public Services Ombudsman Act (Northern Ireland) 2016	2016 c. 4 (N.I.)	19 February 2016
An Act to Establish and make provision about the office of the Northern Ireland Public Services Ombudsman; to abolish the offices of the Northern Ireland Commissioner for Complaints and the Assembly Ombudsman for Northern Ireland; to provide that the Northern Ireland Public Services Ombudsman is, by virtue of holding that office, the Northern Ireland Judicial Appointments Ombudsman; and for connected purposes.
Departments Act (Northern Ireland) 2016	2016 c. 5 (N.I.)	29 February 2016
An Act to rename the Office of the First Minister and deputy First Minister, the Department of Agriculture and Rural Development, the Department of Enterprise, Trade and Investment, the Department of Finance and Personnel, the Department of Health, Social Services and Public Safety, the Department for Regional Development and the Department for Social Development; to dissolve the Department of Culture, Arts and Leisure, the Department of the Environment and the Department for Employment and Learning; and for connected purposes.
Rates (Amendment) Act (Northern Ireland) 2016	2016 c. 6 (N.I.)	11 March 2016
An Act to amend the Rates (Northern Ireland) Order 1977 (Note: Rates (Northern Ireland) Order 1977 (SI 1977/2157)) to enable regulations to be made permitting an increase in the level of reduction in the normal rate to 100% for certain hereditaments used for prescribed recreation; to provide that certain hereditaments are not to be treated for the purposes of the Order as occupied by reason only of them containing certain window displays; and for connected purposes.
Water and Sewerage Services Act (Northern Ireland) 2016	2016 c. 7 (N.I.)	23 March 2016
An Act to amend, and to confer power to amend, the Water and Sewerage Services (Northern Ireland) Order 2006; (Note: Water and Sewerage Services (Northern Ireland) Order 2006 (SI 2006/3336)) and for connected purposes.
Special Educational Needs and Disability Act (Northern Ireland) 2016	2016 c. 8 (N.I.)	23 March 2016
An Act to amend the law relating to special education and disability discrimination in schools.
Budget Act (Northern Ireland) 2016 (repealed)	2016 c. 9 (N.I.)	23 March 2016
An Act to authorise the issue out of the Consolidated Fund of certain sums for the service of the years ending 31st March 2016 and 2017; to appropriate those sums for specified purposes; to authorise the Department of Finance and Personnel to borrow on the credit of the appropriated sums; to authorise the use for the public service of certain resources for the years ending 31st March 2016 and 2017; and to revise the limits on the use of certain accruing (Note: The Queen's Printer edition erroneously misspells the word "accruing" as "acruing" in the long title to the act, but the Journal of Proceedings of the Northern Ireland Assembly confirms that the bill of the same name which was given royal assent on 23 March 2016 used the spelling "accruing". The long title of the act must, therefore, correspond.) resources in the year ending 31st March 2016. (Repealed by Budget (No. 3) Act (Northern Ireland) 2020 (c. 6 (N.I.)))
Assembly and Executive Reform (Assembly Opposition) Act (Northern Ireland) 2016	2016 c. 10 (N.I.)	23 March 2016
An Act to provide for the formation of an Assembly Opposition; to provide for the passing of an Assembly and Executive Transfer of Responsibilities Motion; and to reform the Assembly and the Executive.
Road Traffic (Amendment) Act (Northern Ireland) 2016	2016 c. 11 (N.I.)	23 March 2016
An Act to Amend the law relating to the prescribed limit of alcohol for drink-driving offences; to make further provision for breath testing; to make provision relating to certain offences being specified as fixed penalty offences; to amend the law relating to disqualification on conviction of certain offences; to amend the law, as respects certain vehicles, relating to the requirements to be satisfied to take a test of competence to drive and the restrictions to which newly qualified drivers are subject for a period after passing such a test; to make provision relating to completion of an approved course as an alternative to licence revocation during a new driver's probationary period and extending requirements to wear protective headgear; and for connected purposes.
Health and Social Care (Control of Data Processing) Act (Northern Ireland) 2016	2016 c. 12 (N.I.)	11 April 2016
An Act to make provision about control of data processing in relation to health and social care.
Environmental Better Regulation Act (Northern Ireland) 2016	2016 c. 13 (N.I.)	11 April 2016
An Act to Enable provision to be made for protecting and improving the environment; to provide for an integrated environmental permitting system; to provide for a review of powers of entry and associated powers and for the repeal or rewriting of such powers and for safeguards in relation to them; to provide for the repeal or rewriting of offences connected with the exercise of any such powers and for the preparation of a code of practice in connection with such exercise; to amend the Clean Air (Northern Ireland) Order 1981 (Note: Clean Air (Northern Ireland) Order 1981 (SI 1981/158)) to provide for a new method for authorising fuels for use in a smoke control area and for exempting fireplaces from the provisions of Article 17 of that Order; to amend the Environment (Northern Ireland) Order 2002 (Note: Environment (Northern Ireland) Order 2002 (SI 2002/3153)) to remove the requirement on district councils to make an assessment of air quality under Article 13 of that Order; to amend the Water and Sewerage Services (Northern Ireland) Order 2006 to transfer certain functions to the Department of the Environment from the Department for Regional Development; and for connected purposes.
Legal Complaints and Regulation Act (Northern Ireland) 2016	2016 c. 14 (N.I.)	11 April 2016
An Act to make provision for the establishment of the office of the Legal Services Oversight Commissioner for Northern Ireland; to make provision as regards complaints against members of the legal profession in Northern Ireland; and for connected purposes.
Employment Act (Northern Ireland) 2016	2016 c. 15 (N.I.)	22 April 2016
An Act to make provision relating to conciliation and other matters in connection with industrial tribunals and the Fair Employment Tribunal, including power to refer to chairmen as employment judges; to amend the law relating to protected disclosures; to make provision for disclosure of gender pay information; to make provision for zero hours contracts; to confer power on the Department for Employment and Learning in connection with careers guidance and apprenticeships; to correct references relating to statutory shared parental pay; to make other provision relating to employment; and for connected purposes.
Credit Unions and Co-operative and Community Benefit Societies Act (Northern Ireland) 2016	2016 c. 16 (N.I.)	22 April 2016
An Act to make provision about credit unions and co-operative and community benefit societies; and for connected purposes.
Housing (Amendment) Act (Northern Ireland) 2016	2016 c. 17 (N.I.)	9 May 2016
An Act to make provision for the better sharing of information relating to empty homes or to anti-social behaviour; and to provide for the registration of certain loans as statutory charges.
Mental Capacity Act (Northern Ireland) 2016	2016 c. 18 (N.I.)	9 May 2016
An Act to make new provision relating to persons who lack capacity; to make provision about the powers of criminal courts in respect of persons with disorder; to disapply Part 2 of the Mental Health (Northern Ireland) Order 1986 (Note: Mental Health (Northern Ireland) Order 1986 (SI 1986/595)) in relation to persons aged 16 or over and make other amendments of that Order; to make provision in connection with the Convention on the International Protection of Adults (Note: Hague Protection of Adults Convention) signed at the Hague on 13th January 2000; and for connected purposes.
Rural Needs Act (Northern Ireland) 2016	2016 c. 19 (N.I.)	9 May 2016
An Act to impose a duty on public authorities to have due regard to rural needs; and for connected purposes.
Shared Education Act (Northern Ireland) 2016	2016 c. 20 (N.I.)	9 May 2016
An Act to make provision in relation to shared education.
Justice Act (Northern Ireland) 2016	2016 c. 21 (N.I.)	12 May 2016
An Act to make provision about enforcement of the payment of fines and other penalties; to provide for the appointment and functions of a Prison Ombudsman for Northern Ireland; to amend the law relating to the penalties for certain animal welfare offences, lay visitors for police stations, extreme pornographic and other sexual images, assaults on persons providing ambulance services, the early removal from prison of prisoners liable to removal from the United Kingdom, direct committal for trial, and firearms; and to make provision relating to the costs of the Accountant General of the Court of Judicature.
Houses in Multiple Occupation Act (Northern Ireland) 2016	2016 c. 22 (N.I.)	12 May 2016
An Act to make provision for and in connection with the licensing of houses in multiple occupation.
Health and Personal Social Services (Amendment) Act (Northern Ireland) 2016	2016 c. 23 (N.I.)	12 May 2016
An Act to Make provision about the Northern Ireland Social Care Council and other provision about social care workers.
Licensing Act (Northern Ireland) 2016	2016 c. 24 (N.I.)	12 May 2016
An Act to make provision for the granting of licences to authorise the sale of intoxicating liquor at outdoor stadia.
Addressing Bullying in Schools Act (Northern Ireland) 2016	2016 c. 25 (N.I.)	12 May 2016
An Act to address bullying in grant-aided schools.
Health (Miscellaneous Provisions) Act (Northern Ireland) 2016	2016 c. 26 (N.I.)	12 May 2016
An Act to regulate the sale or use of nicotine products and tobacco, to make provision in relation to sugar sweetened drinks, to amend the Health and Personal Social Services (Northern Ireland) Order 1972 (Note: Health and Personal Social Services (Northern Ireland) Order 1972 (SI 1972/1265)) and the Health (Miscellaneous Provisions) Act (Northern Ireland) 2008 (Note: Health (Miscellaneous Provisions) Act (Northern Ireland) 2008 (c. 2 (N.I.))) in relation to the provision of health care, to raise awareness of human transplantation; and for connected purposes.
Fisheries Act (Northern Ireland) 2016	2016 c. 27 (N.I.)	12 May 2016
An Act to make provision about fisheries.
Land Acquisition and Compensation (Amendment) Act (Northern Ireland) 2016	2016 c. 28 (N.I.)	12 May 2016
An Act to amend the Land Acquisition and Compensation (Northern Ireland) Order 1973 (Note: Land Acquisition and Compensation (Northern Ireland) Order 1973 (SI 1973/1896)) to provide for additional payments for loss following the compulsory acquisition of land.
Assembly Members (Reduction of Numbers) Act (Northern Ireland) 2016	2016 c. 29 (N.I.)	22 July 2016
An Act to reduce the number of members of the Assembly returned for each constituency.
Budget (No. 2) Act (Northern Ireland) 2016 (repealed)	2016 c. 30 (N.I.)	29 July 2016
An Act to authorise the issue out of the Consolidated Fund of certain sums for the service of the year ending 31st March 2017; to appropriate those sums for specified purposes; to authorise the Department of Finance to borrow on the credit of the appropriated sums; to authorise the use for the public service of certain resources (including accruing resources) for the year ending 31st March 2017; to authorise the use of certain excess resources for the year ending 31st March 2015; and to repeal certain spent provisions. (Repealed by Budget (No. 3) Act (Northern Ireland) 2020 (c. 6 (N.I.)))
