= 2024 Democratic Unionist Party leadership election =

Leadership election of the DUP, a Northern Irish political party

- 29 May 2024
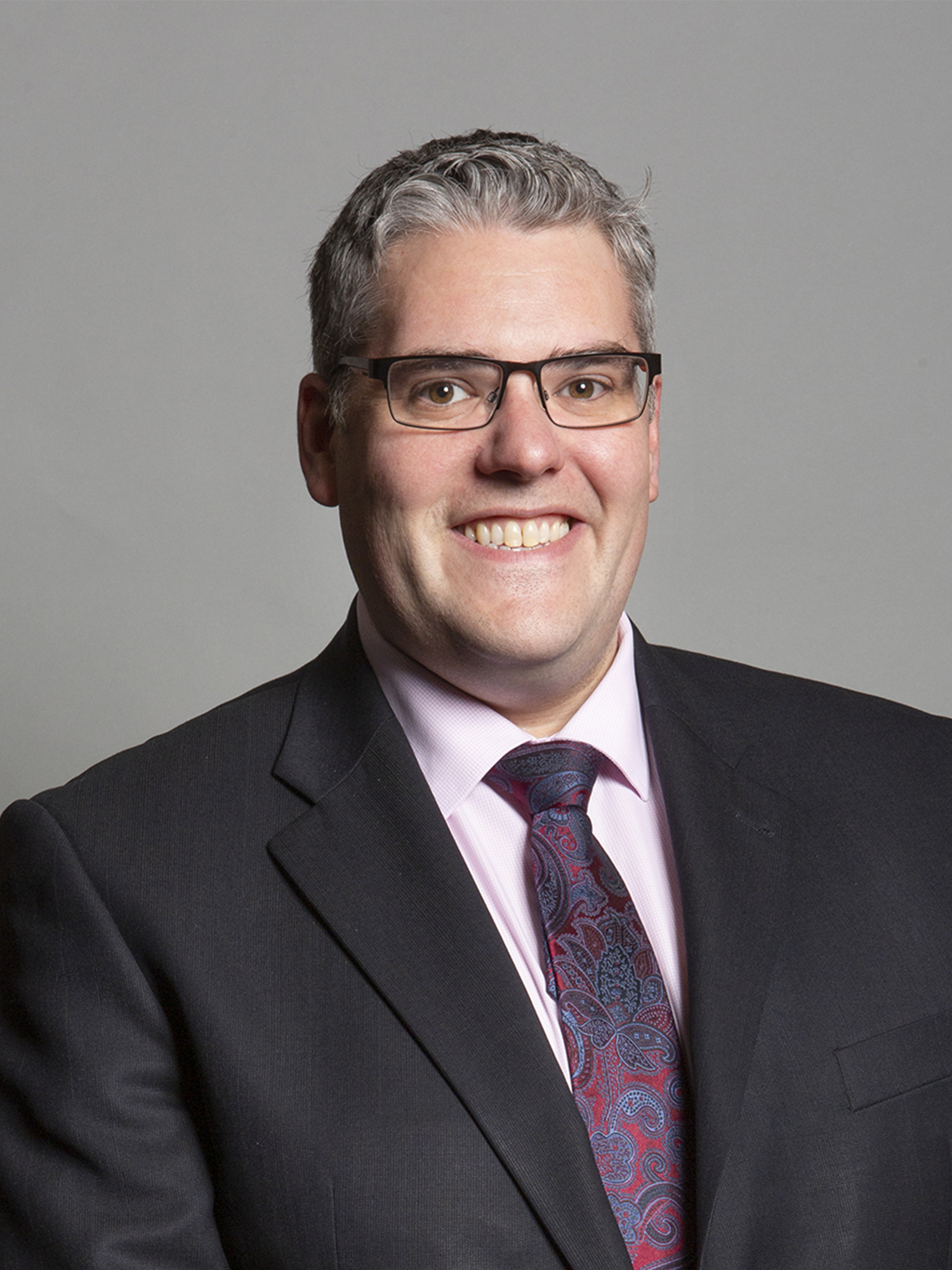
Candidate	Gavin Robinson
Popular vote	Unopposed
Leader before election
Gavin Robinson (interim)
Jeffrey Donaldson
Elected Leader
Gavin Robinson

The 2024 Democratic Unionist Party leadership election was held on 29 May 2024 at a meeting of the Party Executive to ratify Gavin Robinson as DUP leader.

Robinson had been serving as serving as interim leader since early April when Sir Jeffrey Donaldson resigned from the DUP after being charged with historical sexual offences.

== Background ==
Gavin Robinson has served as Member of Parliament (MP) for East Belfast since the 2015 general election. On 9 June 2023, he was elected as deputy leader of the DUP, defeating Jonathan Buckley who is a Member of the Legislative Assembly (MLA) for Upper Bann.

On 29 March 2024, Sir Jeffrey Donaldson stepped down as leader of the party, having been charged with rape and historical sexual offences. Robinson was thus "unanimously" appointed as the interim DUP leader by Party Officers.

The party sought to elect a permanent leader following the calling of the 2024 general election by Prime Minister Rishi Sunak on 22 May 2024.

== Candidates ==
=== Declared ===
Candidate	Born	Political office	Notes
Gavin Robinson	22 November 1984; Belfast, Northern Ireland	Interim Leader of the Democratic Unionist Party (since 2024); MP for East Belfast (since 2015)	Robinson is considered "politically close" to former leader Sir Jeffrey Donaldson, under whom he served as deputy leader.

=== Declined ===
Candidate	Born	Political office	Notes
Sammy Wilson	4 April 1952; Belfast, Northern Ireland	Democratic Unionist Party Chief Whip in the House of Commons (2019–2024); MP for East Antrim (since 2005)	Wilson is an outspoken critic of the party's Safeguarding the Union deal with the UK government, which restored devolution at Stormont.

== Results ==
Gavin Robinson was "unanimously" ratified as the party’s leader at a meeting of its ruling executive on 29 May 2024.

2024 Democratic Unionist Party leadership election
Candidate	Nominated by
Gavin Robinson	Self-nominated
