= Committee for Finance =

The Committee for Finance is a Northern Ireland Assembly committee established to advise, assist and scrutinise the work of the Department of Finance and the Minister of Finance (currently Caoimhe Archibald). The committee also plays a key role in the consultation, consideration and development of new legislation.

Until 2016, the committee was called the Committee for Finance and Personnel.

== Membership ==
Membership of the committee is as follows:

Party	Member	Constituency
SDLP	Matthew O'Toole MLA (Chairperson)	Belfast South
DUP	Diane Forsythe MLA (Deputy Chairperson)	South Down
UUP	Steve Aiken MLA	South Antrim
People Before Profit	Gerry Carroll MLA	Belfast West
Sinn Féin	Jemma Dolan MLA	Fermanagh and South Tyrone
Sinn Féin	Deirdre Hargey MLA	Belfast South
DUP	Harry Harvey MLA	Strangford
DUP	Brian Kingston MLA	Belfast North
Alliance	Eóin Tennyson MLA	Upper Bann

== 2022–2027 Assembly ==
Party	Member	Constituency
SDLP	Matthew O'Toole MLA (Chairperson)	Belfast South
DUP	Diane Forsythe MLA (Deputy Chairperson)	South Down
UUP	Steve Aiken MLA	South Antrim
DUP	Phillip Brett MLA	Belfast North
Sinn Féin	Nicola Brogan MLA	West Tyrone
People Before Profit	Gerry Carroll MLA	Belfast West
DUP	Paul Frew MLA	North Antrim
Sinn Féin	Deirdre Hargey MLA	Belfast South
Alliance	Eóin Tennyson MLA	Upper Bann

=== Changes 2022–2027 ===
Date	Outgoing member and party	Constituency	→	New member and party	Constituency
11 February 2025	Nicola Brogan MLA (Sinn Féin)	West Tyrone	→	Jemma Dolan MLA (Sinn Féin)	Fermanagh and South Tyrone
23 September 2025	Phillip Brett MLA (DUP)	Belfast North	→	Harry Harvey MLA (DUP)	Strangford
23 September 2025	Paul Frew MLA (DUP)	North Antrim	→	Brian Kingston MLA (DUP)	Belfast North

== 2017-2022 Assembly ==
Party	Member	Constituency
UUP	Steve Aiken MLA (Chairperson)	South Antrim
DUP	Paul Frew MLA (Deputy Chairperson)	North Antrim
TUV	Jim Allister MLA	North Antrim
SDLP	Pat Catney MLA	Lagan Valley
DUP	Phillip Brett MLA	Belfast North
Sinn Féin	Jemma Dolan MLA	Fermanagh and South Tyrone
Sinn Féin	Maolíosa McHugh MLA	West Tyrone
SDLP	Matthew O'Toole MLA	Belfast South
DUP	Jim Wells MLA	South Down

=== Changes 2017-2022 ===
Date	Outgoing member and party	Constituency	→	New member and party	Constituency
14 June 2021	Paul Frew MLA (Deputy Chairperson, DUP)	North Antrim	→	Keith Buchanan MLA (Deputy Chairperson, DUP)	Mid Ulster

== 2016-2017 Assembly ==
Party	Member	Constituency
DUP	Emma Little-Pengelly MLA (Chairperson)	Belfast South
SDLP	Claire Hanna MLA (Deputy Chairperson)	Belfast South
TUV	Jim Allister MLA	North Antrim
DUP	Jonathan Bell MLA	Strangford
DUP	Paul Girvan MLA	South Antrim
UUP	Ross Hussey MLA	West Tyrone
SDLP	Gerry Mullan MLA	East Londonderry
Sinn Féin	John O'Dowd MLA	Upper Bann
Sinn Féin	Caitríona Ruane MLA	South Down
UUP	Philip Smith MLA	Strangford
DUP	Jim Wells MLA	South Down

=== Changes 2016-2017 ===
None

== 2011-2016 Assembly ==
Party	Member	Constituency
Sinn Féin	Conor Murphy MLA (Chairperson)	Newry and Armagh
SDLP	Dominic Bradley MLA (Deputy Chairperson)	Newry and Armagh
Alliance	Judith Cochrane MLA	Belfast East
UUP	Leslie Cree MLA	North Down
DUP	Paul Girvan MLA	South Antrim
DUP	David Hilditch MLA	East Antrim
DUP	William Humphrey MLA	East Antrim
Sinn Féin	Paul Maskey MLA	Belfast West
DUP	Adrian McQuillan MLA	East Londonderry
Sinn Féin	Mitchel McLaughlin MLA	South Antrim
Sinn Féin	Caitríona Ruane MLA	South Down

=== Changes 2011-2016 ===
Date	Outgoing member and party	Constituency	→	New member and party	Constituency
23 April 2012	Ross Hussey MLA (UUP)	West Tyrone	→	Roy Beggs Jr MLA (UUP)	East Antrim
2 July 2012	Conor Murphy MLA (Chairperson, Sinn Féin)	Newry and Armagh	→	Daithí McKay MLA (Chairperson, Sinn Féin)	North Antrim
2 July 2012	Paul Maskey MLA (Sinn Féin)	Belfast West	→	Daithí McKay MLA (Sinn Féin)	North Antrim
23 September 2025	David Hilditch MLA (DUP)	East Antrim	→	David McIlveen MLA (DUP)	North Antrim
23 September 2025	William Humphrey MLA (DUP)	Belfast North	→	Peter Weir MLA (DUP)	North Down
16 September 2013	David McIlveen MLA (DUP)	North Antrim	→	Ian McCrea MLA (DUP)	Mid Ulster
2 November 2013	Megan Fearon MLA (Sinn Féin)	Newry and Armagh	→	Michaela Boyle MLA (Sinn Féin)	West Tyrone
6 October 2014	Mitchel McLaughlin MLA (Sinn Féin)	South Antrim	→	Raymond McCartney MLA (Sinn Féin)	Foyle
10 November 2014	Raymond McCartney MLA (Sinn Féin)	Foyle	→	Máirtín Ó Muilleoir MLA (Sinn Féin)	Belfast South
18 May 2015	Peter Weir MLA (DUP)	North Down	→	Jim Wells MLA (DUP)	South Down
5 October 2015	Paul Girvan MLA (DUP)	South Antrim	→	Emma Little-Pengelly MLA (DUP)	Belfast South
5 October 2015	Adrian McQuillan MLA (DUP)	East Londonderry	→	Gordon Lyons MLA (DUP)	East Antrim
9 November 2015	Emma Little-Pengelly MLA (DUP)	Belfast South	→	Gary Middleton MLA (DUP)	Foyle
4 January 2016	Dominic Bradley MLA (Deputy Chairperson, SDLP)	Newry and Armagh	→	Claire Hanna MLA (Deputy Chairperson, SDLP)	Belfast South

== 2007-2011 Assembly ==
Party	Member	Constituency
Sinn Féin	Mitchel McLaughlin MLA (Chairperson)	South Antrim
DUP	Mervyn Storey MLA (Deputy Chairperson)	North Antrim
UUP	Roy Beggs Jr MLA	East Antrim
Alliance	Stephen Farry MLA	North Down
DUP	Simon Hamilton MLA	Strangford
Sinn Féin	Fra McCann MLA	Belfast West
Sinn Féin	Jennifer McCann MLA	Belfast West
DUP	Adrian McQuillan MLA	East Londonderry
SDLP	Declan O'Loan MLA	North Antrim
PUP	Dawn Purvis MLA	Belfast East
DUP	Peter Weir MLA	North Down

=== Changes 2007-2011 ===
Date	Outgoing member and party	Constituency	→	New member and party	Constituency
10 June 2008	Mervyn Storey MLA (Deputy Chairperson, DUP)	North Antrim	→	Simon Hamilton MLA (Deputy Chairperson, DUP)	Strangford
30 June 2008	Mervyn Storey MLA (DUP)	North Antrim	→	Ian Paisley Jr MLA (DUP)	North Antrim
29 September 2008	Roy Beggs Jr MLA (DUP)	East Antrim	→	David McNarry MLA (DUP)	Strangford
4 July 2009	Simon Hamilton MLA (Deputy Chairperson, DUP)	Strangford	→	Peter Weir MLA (Deputy Chairperson, DUP)	North Down
9 September 2009	Mitchel McLaughlin MLA (Sinn Féin)	South Antrim	→	Jennifer McCann MLA (Sinn Féin)	Belfast West
13 April 2010	Peter Weir MLA (Deputy Chairperson, DUP)	North Down	→	David McNarry MLA (Deputy Chairperson, UUP)	Strangford
14 April 2010	Peter Weir MLA (DUP)	North Down	→	Jonathan Craig MLA (DUP)	Lagan Valley
18 June 2010	Ian Paisley Jr MLA (DUP)	North Antrim	→	Vacant	
14 September 2010	Jonathan Craig MLA (DUP)	Lagan Valley	→	Paul Frew MLA (DUP)	North Antrim
14 September 2010	Vacant		→	Paul Girvan MLA (DUP)	South Antrim
14 September 2009	Fra McCann MLA (Sinn Féin)	Belfast West	→	Daithí McKay MLA (Sinn Féin)	North Antrim
20 January 2011	Jennifer McCann MLA (Chairperson, Sinn Féin)	Belfast West	→	Daithí McKay MLA (Chairperson, Sinn Féin)	North Antrim

== 1998-2003 Assembly ==
Party	Member	Constituency
Sinn Féin	Francie Molloy MLA (Chairperson)	Mid Ulster
SDLP	Alex Attwood MLA	Belfast West
UUP	Billy Bell MLA	Lagan Valley
Alliance	Seamus Close MLA	Lagan Valley
SDLP	John Dallat MLA	East Londonderry
DUP	Oliver Gibson MLA	West Tyrone
UUP	Derek Hussey MLA	West Tyrone
DUP	Gardiner Kane MLA	North Antrim
UUP	James Leslie MLA	North Antrim
Sinn Féin	Alex Maskey MLA	Belfast West
SDLP	Donovan McClelland MLA	South Antrim
UUP	Dermot Nesbitt MLA	South Down
DUP	Peter Weir MLA	North Down

=== Changes 1998-2003 ===
Date	Outgoing member and party	Constituency	→	New member and party	Constituency
25 January 2000	Dermot Nesbitt MLA (UUP)	South Down	→	Vacant	
27 January 2000	John Dallat MLA (SDLP)	East Londonderry	→	Vacant	
2 October 2000	Oliver Gibson MLA (DUP)	West Tyrone	→	Nigel Dodds MLA (DUP)	Belfast North
2 October 2000	Gardiner Kane MLA (DUP)	North Antrim	→	Peter Robinson MLA (DUP)	Belfast East
15 January 2001	Donovan McClelland MLA (SDLP)	South Antrim	→	Patricia Lewsley MLA (SDLP)	Lagan Valley
12 November 2001	Nigel Dodds MLA (DUP)	Belfast North	→	Roger Hutchinson MLA (DUP)	East Antrim
12 November 2001	Peter Robinson MLA (DUP)	Belfast East	→	Maurice Morrow MLA (DUP)	Fermanagh and South Tyrone
4 March 2002	James Leslie MLA (UUP)	North Antrim	→	Roy Beggs Jr MLA (Deputy Chairperson, UUP)	East Antrim

== See also ==
- Committee
