= Committee for the Economy =

The Committee for the Economy is a Northern Ireland Assembly committee established to advise, assist and scrutinise the work of the Department for the Economy and Minister for the Economy (currently Caoimhe Archibald). The committee also plays a key role in the consultation, consideration and development of new legislation.

Until 2016, the committee was called the Committee for Enterprise, Trade and Investment.

== Membership ==
Membership of the committee is as follows:

Party	Member	Constituency
DUP	Phillip Brett MLA (Chairperson)	Belfast North
DUP	Gary Middleton MLA (Deputy Chairperson)	Foyle
UUP	Diana Armstrong MLA	Fermanagh and South Tyrone
DUP	Jonathan Buckley MLA	Upper Bann
Sinn Féin	Pádraig Delargy MLA	Foyle
Alliance	David Honeyford MLA	Lagan Valley
SDLP	Sinéad McLaughlin MLA	Foyle
Alliance	Kate Nicholl MLA	Belfast South
Sinn Féin	Emma Sheerin MLA	Mid Ulster

== 2022–2027 Assembly ==
Party	Member	Constituency
DUP	Phillip Brett MLA (Chairperson)	Belfast North
DUP	Gary Middleton MLA (Deputy Chairperson)	Foyle
DUP	Jonathan Buckley MLA	Upper Bann
Sinn Féin	Pádraig Delargy MLA	Foyle
Alliance	Sorcha Eastwood MLA	Lagan Valley
Alliance	David Honeyford MLA	Lagan Valley
Sinn Féin	Philip McGuigan MLA	North Antrim
SDLP	Sinéad McLaughlin MLA	Foyle
UUP	Mike Nesbitt MLA	Strangford

=== Changes 2022–2027 ===
Date	Outgoing member and party	Constituency	→	New member and party	Constituency
17 June 2024	Mike Nesbitt MLA (UUP)	Strangford	→	Doug Beattie MLA (UUP)	Upper Bann
5 July 2024	Sorcha Eastwood MLA (Alliance)	Lagan Valley	→	Kate Nicholl MLA (Alliance)	Belfast South
9 September 2024	Doug Beattie MLA (UUP)	Upper Bann	→	Colin Crawford MLA (UUP)	North Antrim
7 October 2024	Colin Crawford MLA (UUP)	North Antrim	→	Diana Armstrong MLA (UUP)	Fermanagh and South Tyrone
10 February 2025	Philip McGuigan MLA (Sinn Féin)	North Antrim	→	Emma Sheerin MLA (Sinn Féin)	Mid Ulster

== 2017-2022 Assembly ==
Party	Member	Constituency
Sinn Féin	Caoimhe Archibald MLA (Chairperson)	East Londonderry
SDLP	Sinéad McLaughlin MLA (Deputy Chairperson)	Foyle
UUP	Alan Chambers MLA	North Down
Alliance	Stewart Dickson MLA	East Antrim
DUP	Gordon Dunne MLA	North Down
DUP	Gary Middleton MLA	Foyle
Sinn Féin	John O'Dowd MLA	Upper Bann
Ind. Unionist	Claire Sugden MLA	East Londonderry
DUP	Christopher Stalford MLA	Belfast South

=== Changes 2017–2022 ===
Date	Outgoing member and party	Constituency	→	New member and party	Constituency
10 February 2020	Alan Chambers MLA (UUP)	North Down	→	John Stewart MLA (UUP)	East Antrim
8 February 2021	Gary Middleton MLA (DUP)	Foyle	→	Paul Givan MLA (DUP)	Lagan Valley
19 March 2021	Paul Givan MLA (DUP)	Lagan Valley	→	Gary Middleton MLA (DUP)	Foyle
12 April 2024	Gordon Dunne MLA (DUP)	North Down	→	Mervyn Storey MLA (DUP)	North Antrim
1 June 2021	John Stewart MLA (UUP)	East Antrim	→	Mike Nesbitt MLA (UUP)	Strangford
21 June 2021	Mervyn Storey MLA (DUP)	North Antrim	→	Keith Buchanan MLA (DUP)	Mid Ulster
21 June 2021	Christopher Stalford MLA (DUP)	Belfast South	→	Peter Weir MLA (DUP)	Strangford
5 July 2021	Gary Middleton MLA (DUP)	Foyle	→	Stephen Dunne MLA (DUP)	North Down
18 October 2021	Sinéad McLaughlin MLA (Deputy Chairperson, SDLP)	Foyle	→	Matthew O'Toole MLA (Deputy Chairperson, SDLP)	Belfast South

== 2016-2017 Assembly ==
Party	Member	Constituency
Sinn Féin	Conor Murphy MLA (Chairperson)	Newry and Armagh
UUP	Steve Aiken MLA (Deputy Chairperson)	South Antrim
Sinn Féin	Caoimhe Archibald MLA	East Londonderry
SDLP	Sinéad Bradley MLA	South Down
DUP	Tom Buchanan MLA	West Tyrone
UUP	Alan Chambers MLA	North Down
DUP	Gordon Dunne MLA	North Down
Alliance	Stephen Farry MLA	North Down
DUP	Gordon Lyons MLA	East Antrim
Sinn Féin	Alex Maskey MLA	Belfast West
DUP	Mervyn Storey MLA	North Antrim

=== Changes 2016–2017 ===
None

== 2011-2016 Assembly ==
Party	Member	Constituency
SDLP	Alban Maginness MLA (Chairperson)	Belfast North
Sinn Féin	Daithí McKay MLA (Deputy Chairperson)	North Antrim
Green (NI)	Steven Agnew MLA	North Down
DUP	Gordon Dunne MLA	North Down
Sinn Féin	Phil Flanagan MLA	Fermanagh and South Tyrone
SDLP	Alasdair McDonnell MLA	Belfast South
DUP	Stephen Moutray MLA	Upper Bann
UUP	Mike Nesbitt MLA	Strangford
DUP	Robin Newton MLA	Belfast East
Sinn Féin	Sue Ramsey MLA	Belfast West
DUP	David McIlveen MLA	North Antrim

=== Changes 2011-2016 ===
Date	Outgoing member and party	Constituency	→	New member and party	Constituency
24 October 2011	David McIlveen MLA (DUP)	North Antrim	→	Paul Frew MLA (DUP)	North Antrim
23 January 2012	Sue Ramsey MLA (Sinn Féin)	Belfast West	→	Jennifer McCann MLA (Sinn Féin)	Belfast West
6 February 2012	Mike Nesbitt MLA (UUP)	Strangford	→	Sandra Overend MLA (UUP)	Mid Ulster
27 February 2012	Robin Newton MLA (DUP)	Belfast East	→	Paul Givan MLA (DUP)	Lagan Valley
23 April 2012	Alasdair McDonnell MLA (SDLP)	Belfast South	→	Patsy McGlone MLA (SDLP)	Mid Ulster
21 May 2012	Paul Givan MLA (DUP)	Lagan Valley	→	Robin Newton MLA (DUP)	Belfast East
2 July 2012	Daithí McKay MLA (Deputy Chairperson, Sinn Féin)	North Antrim	→	Phil Flanagan MLA (Deputy Chairperson, Sinn Féin)	Fermanagh and South Tyrone
10 September 2012	Alban Maginness MLA (Chairperson, SDLP)	Belfast North	→	Patsy McGlone MLA (Chairperson, SDLP)	Mid Ulster
10 September 2012	Jennifer McCann MLA (Sinn Féin)	Belfast West	→	Maeve McLaughlin MLA (Sinn Féin)	Foyle
10 September 2012	Daithí McKay MLA (Sinn Féin)	North Antrim	→	Sue Ramsey MLA (Sinn Féin)	Belfast West
16 September 2013	Stephen Moutray MLA (DUP)	Upper Bann	→	Sydney Anderson MLA (DUP)	Upper Bann
16 September 2013	Robin Newton MLA (DUP)	Belfast East	→	Sammy Douglas MLA (DUP)	Belfast East
7 October 2013	Alban Maginness MLA (Chairperson, SDLP)	Belfast North	→	Fearghal McKinney MLA (Chairperson, SDLP)	Belfast South
21 October 2013	Sue Ramsey MLA (Sinn Féin)	Belfast West	→	Mitchel McLaughlin MLA (Sinn Féin)	South Antrim
2 December 2013	Maeve McLaughlin MLA (Sinn Féin)	Foyle	→	Megan Fearon MLA (Sinn Féin)	Newry and Armagh
4 July 2014	Sandra Overend MLA (UUP)	Mid Ulster	→	Danny Kinahan MLA (UUP)	South Antrim
6 October 2014	Sammy Douglas MLA (DUP)	Belfast East	→	William Humphrey MLA (DUP)	Belfast North
6 October 2014	Mitchel McLaughlin MLA (Sinn Féin)	South Antrim	→	Chris Hazzard MLA (Sinn Féin)	South Down
11 November 2014	Chris Hazzard MLA (Sinn Féin)	South Down	→	Máirtín Ó Muilleoir MLA (Sinn Féin)	Belfast South
1 December 2014	Sydney Anderson MLA (DUP)	Upper Bann	→	Paul Givan MLA (DUP)	Lagan Valley
30 June 2015	Danny Kinahan MLA (UUP)	South Antrim	→	Adrian Cochrane-Watson MLA (UUP)	South Antrim
11 September 2015	Phil Flanagan MLA (Deputy Chairperson, Sinn Féin)	Fermanagh and South Tyrone	→	Conor Murphy MLA (Deputy Chairperson, Sinn Féin)	Newry and Armagh
5 October 2015	Paul Frew MLA (DUP)	North Antrim	→	Paul Girvan MLA (DUP)	South Antrim
16 November 2015	Paul Girvan MLA (DUP)	South Antrim	→	Maurice Morrow MLA (DUP)	Fermanagh and South Tyrone
18 January 2016	Maurice Morrow MLA (DUP)	Fermanagh and South Tyrone	→	David McIlveen MLA (DUP)	North Antrim

== 2007-2011 Assembly ==
Party	Member	Constituency
SDLP	Mark Durkan MLA (Chairperson)	Foyle
Sinn Féin	Paul Maskey MLA (Deputy Chairperson)	Belfast West
UUP	Leslie Cree MLA	North Down
DUP	Simon Hamilton MLA	Strangford
Sinn Féin	Jennifer McCann MLA	Belfast West
SDLP	Alasdair McDonnell MLA	Belfast South
UUP	Alan McFarland MLA	North Down
Sinn Féin	Mitchel McLaughlin MLA	South Antrim
Alliance	Seán Neeson MLA	East Antrim
DUP	Robin Newton MLA	Belfast East
DUP	David Simpson MLA	Upper Bann

=== Changes 2007-2011 ===
Date	Outgoing member and party	Constituency	→	New member and party	Constituency
10 September 2007	Mitchel McLaughlin MLA (Sinn Féin)	South Antrim	→	Francie Molloy MLA (Sinn Féin)	Mid Ulster
21 January 2008	Francie Molloy MLA (Sinn Féin)	Mid Ulster	→	Gerry McHugh MLA (Sinn Féin)	Fermanagh and South Tyrone
20 May 2008	Paul Maskey MLA (Deputy Chairperson, Sinn Féin)	Belfast West	→	Jennifer McCann MLA (Deputy Chairperson, Sinn Féin)	Belfast West
15 September 2008	David Simpson MLA (DUP)	Upper Bann	→	Jim Wells MLA (DUP)	South Down
30 June 2009	Mark Durkan MLA (Chairperson, SDLP)	Foyle	→	Alban Maginness MLA (Chairperson, SDLP)	Belfast North
14 September 2009	Jennifer McCann MLA (Sinn Féin)	Belfast West	→	Paul Butler MLA (Sinn Féin)	Lagan Valley
14 September 2009	Simon Hamilton MLA (DUP)	Strangford	→	Gregory Campbell MLA (DUP)	East Londonderry
14 September 2009	Robin Newton MLA (DUP)	Belfast East	→	Stephen Moutray MLA (DUP)	Upper Bann
14 September 2009	Jim Wells MLA (DUP)	South Down	→	David Simpson MLA (DUP)	Upper Bann
30 March 2010	Alan McFarland MLA (UUP)	North Down	→	Vacant	
29 June 2010	Stephen Moutray MLA (DUP)	Upper Bann	→	Paul Frew MLA (DUP)	North Antrim
16 September 2013	Gregory Campbell MLA (DUP)	East Londonderry	→	Paul Givan MLA (DUP)	Lagan Valley
16 September 2013	David Simpson MLA (DUP)	Upper Bann	→	William Irwin MLA (DUP)	Newry and Armagh
14 September 2009	Daithí McKay MLA (Sinn Féin)	North Antrim	→	Claire McGill MLA (Sinn Féin)	West Tyrone

== 1998-2003 Assembly ==
Party	Member	Constituency
Sinn Féin	Pat Doherty MLA (Chairperson)	West Tyrone
Alliance	Seán Neeson MLA (Deputy Chairperson)	East Antrim
SDLP	Alex Attwood MLA	Belfast West
DUP	Gregory Campbell MLA	East Londonderry
DUP	Wilson Clyde MLA	South Antrim
SDLP	Patricia Lewsley MLA	Lagan Valley
UUP	David McClarty MLA	East Londonderry
SDLP	Alasdair McDonnell MLA	Belfast South
NI Women's Coalition	Jane Morrice MLA	North Down
Sinn Féin	Dara O'Hagan MLA	Upper Bann
UUP	Duncan Shipley-Dalton MLA	South Antrim

=== Changes 1998-2003 ===
Date	Outgoing member and party	Constituency	→	New member and party	Constituency
27 July 2000	Gregory Campbell MLA (DUP)	East Londonderry	→	Jim Wells MLA (DUP)	South Down
30 January 2001	Patricia Lewsley MLA (SDLP)	Lagan Valley	→	Annie Courtney MLA (SDLP)	Foyle
24 September 2001	Duncan Shipley-Dalton MLA (UUP)	South Antrim	→	Billy Armstrong MLA (UUP)	Mid Ulster
18 February 2002	Alex Attwood MLA (SDLP)	Belfast West	→	Eugene McMenamin MLA (SDLP)	West Tyrone

== See also ==
- Committee
