= Patricia O'Lynn =

Alliance Party of Northern Ireland MLA

Patricia O'Lynn MLA

Member of the Northern Ireland Assembly for North Antrim
- In office 5 May 2022 – 31 March 2023
- Preceded by: Mervyn Storey
- Succeeded by: Sian Mulholland

Member of Mid and East Antrim Borough Council
- In office 2 May 2019 – 5 May 2022
- Preceded by: Reuben Glover
- Succeeded by: John Hyland
- Constituency: Ballymena

Personal details
- Born: 28 September 1989 (age 36)
- Party: Alliance
- Education: St Killian's College
- Alma mater: Queen's University Belfast (LLB, PhD)
- Occupation: Policy professional
- Website: Assembly profile Personal website

Academic background
- Thesis: Mainstream, margins and the spaces in-between: youth experiences of school exclusion in Northern Ireland
- Doctoral advisor: Lesley Emerson and Gavin Duffy

Patricia O'Lynn (born 28 September 1989) is a Northern Irish policy professional, academic, educator and former politician. She was an Alliance Party Member of the Legislative Assembly (MLA) from 2022 to 2023 and has served as Head of Policy and Engagement at the Law Society of Northern Ireland since 2024.

== Political career ==
=== Early career ===
In 2016, as part of the Washington-Ireland Program, O'Lynn worked as a congressional intern for U.S. Senator John McCain.

O'Lynn ran as the Alliance Party candidate for North Antrim in the 2017 Northern Ireland Assembly election, but was unsuccessful. In September 2017, O'Lynn met with Kate Nicholl, then an Alliance councillor on Belfast City Council, who encouraged her to join Alliance and run as a candidate. She was an Alliance candidate again later that year, this time for the 2017 UK general election, running in North Antrim. She came fifth, with 2,723 votes, maintaining Alliance's percentage share of the vote from the previous general election.

O'Lynn then served as a councillor, representing Ballymena, in Mid and East Antrim Borough Council. She was elected at the 2019 local elections, gaining a seat from the DUP.

Later that year, at the 2019 general election, O'Lynn was again the Alliance candidate for the parliamentary constituency of North Antrim. She polled 6,231 votes, taking third place, and increased her share of the vote by 8.5%.

From April 2021 to October 2021, O'Lynn served as a special adviser to Justice Minister Naomi Long while Long's other special adviser Claire Johnson was on maternity leave.

=== Member of the Legislative Assembly (2022-23) ===
On 7 May 2022, O'Lynn was elected as the first ever Alliance MLA and the first woman to represent North Antrim in the Northern Ireland Assembly. She was elected on the sixth stage of the count, defeating incumbent DUP MLA Mervyn Storey by a margin of 288 votes - the third tightest margin of victory in Northern Ireland. Her election was considered an upset in the staunchly unionist constituency of North Antrim with BelfastLive describing it as a "seismic shift". In her victory speech, O'Lynn said that the "age of entitlement is over" for DUP dominance in the constituency. Jim Allister, on the other hand, said that Mervyn Storey's loss was a "matter of great sadness to me that his seat has been taken by the crypto-nationalist Alliance Party".

On 22 February 2023, O'Lynn announced that she would resign from Stormont on 31 March to take up a job at Queen's University Belfast. O'Lynn said that it "has been an honour to serve the people of North Antrim" but regrets that she could not "do so in the Assembly chamber itself due to the ongoing impasse, which has proved frustrating". Former MLA Mervyn Storey, who lost his seat to O'Lynn, questioned her "commitment" to North Antrim. O'Lynn responded that Storey "desperately needs" a hug. On 16 March, two weeks before leaving office, O'Lynn shared a new personal website that describes her as a keynote speaker, author and coach.

The vacant position created from Lynn's resignation was filled by the co-option of Sian Mulholland, an Alliance councillor on Lisburn and Castlereagh Council. Mulholland was previously co-opted onto Lisburn and Castlereagh Council in 2022 to fill David Honeyford's vacancy following his election to the Assembly and Mulholland also served on Belfast City Council from 2015 to 2022.

== Post-political career ==
O'Lynn resigned from the Northern Ireland Assembly on 31 March 2023 to take up a role at Queen's University Belfast. She subsequently worked as a postgraduate leadership and training consultant in the university's Graduate School. In June 2024, she was appointed Head of Policy and Engagement at the Law Society of Northern Ireland.

== Personal life ==
In 2021, O'Lynn completed doctoral research at Queen’s University Belfast. Her doctoral thesis was titled 'Mainstreams, Margins and the Spaces In-Between: Youth Experiences of School Exclusion in Northern Ireland' and focused on young people’s experiences of exclusion from school within Northern Ireland. She also received the Sir Tomas Dixon Award and the Department for Economy doctoral scholarship. O'Lynn officially graduated from Queen's University Belfast with a PhD on 2 July 2022.

== Academic works ==
- O'Lynn, Patricia (2016). "The right to education for young people excluded from mainstream in a divided society". Northern Ireland Legal Quarterly. 67 (4): 491–514. doi:10.53386/nilq.v67i4.132.
- McMullen, John; Jones, Sharon; Campbell, Rachel; McLaughlin, Judith; McDade, Barbara; O'Lynn, Patricia; Glen, Catherine (2020). "'Sitting on a wobbly chair': mental health and wellbeing among newcomer pupils in Northern Irish schools". Emotional and Behavioural Difficulties. 25 (2): 125–138. doi:10.1080/01629778.2020.1763095. S2CID 219411055.
- O'Lynn, Patricia (2022). Mainstream, margins and the spaces in-between: youth experiences of school exclusion in Northern Ireland (Thesis). Queen's University Belfast.
