= Washington-Ireland Program =

Development program bringing Irish students to Washington, D.C

The Washington-Ireland Program for Service and Leadership (WIP) is a six-month program of personal and professional development that brings university students from Northern Ireland and the Republic of Ireland to Washington, DC for summer internships and leadership training. The program begins and ends with practical service (usually some form of voluntary work in the NGO or political sectors) in Northern Ireland and the Republic of Ireland. Originally known as the "Young Leaders Program", it was renamed in 2003.

In Washington, participants get first-hand experience with U.S. government and politics and an immersion in American culture by living with an area host family. The eight-week program aims to send students home with enhanced professional and interpersonal skills and a new confidence in their own leadership abilities which they are expected to demonstrate through service to their own communities. Among the 2007 Internship opportunities were placements in the Senate offices of then Senators Barack Obama and Hillary Clinton.

== History ==
The WIP program has been operating since 1995. Since its inception in the 1990s, the program has expanded from four to eight weeks, allowing time for both leadership training and work experience. Students are placed in offices across the Washington metropolitan region representing federal and local government, businesses, non-profit organizations, professional services firms and media organizations. Placements have included The White House, Congressional offices, Northern Ireland Bureau, World Bank, Habitat for Humanity, AFL-CIO, CNN and CBS, Library of Congress, Environmental Protection Agency, National Center for Missing and Exploited Children, The Justice Project, Imagination Stage and Solas Nua.

Participants are intended to develop practical leadership abilities by committing to 30 hours of service in their own communities before the summer and 40 hours in a Group Service Project when they return. Students may also help launch and run the following year's program by assisting with marketing, recruiting, selecting and mentoring the succeeding WIP class.

Successful candidates must be Irish-born, or Irish or British (NI) citizens with current passports. They must be full-time students in Ireland or the United Kingdom, between the ages of 18 and 25, and passing their subjects at a better than passing grade.

Initially begun in partnership with the Students' Union at Queen's University, Belfast, WIP has received support from the Irish Government through its Department of Education and the International Fund for Ireland as well as the UK government and the US State Department.

The Washington-Ireland Program is an extension of Project Children, a program that sponsors six-week summer holidays in the U.S. for young people from Northern Ireland. The participants in Project Children, who stay with American host families, range in age from 10–14 years old and come from neighborhoods impacted by the Troubles in Northern Ireland.

== Youth Empowerment Scheme ==
In 2001, alumni members of the Washington-Ireland Programme established a charity known as the Youth Empowerment Scheme (YES). The scheme created a mentoring programme in which young adults acted as mentors for children aged 11–14 years old. In 2006, members of the Youth Empowerment Scheme visited South Africa as part of an "exchange" with the University of KwaZulu-Natal in Durban. YES undertook fundraising to fund its activities and, for example, held a 'night at the movies' fundraiser at the Sheridan IMAX movie theatre in early 2005.

== Notable alumni ==
- Leo Varadkar (class of 2000), Fine Gael TD who became Ireland's youngest ever Taoiseach.
- Chris Lyttle (class of 2002), Alliance Party MLA for East Belfast.
- Emma Little-Pengelly (class of 2002), Democratic Unionist Party MLA within the Northern Ireland Executive.
- Noel Rock (class of 2006), Fine Gael TD for Dublin North-West.
- Claire Sugden (class of 2008), independent MLA for East Londonderry and former Justice Minister in the Northern Ireland Executive.
- Nuala McAllister (class of 2010), Alliance Party MLA for Belfast North.
- Patricia O'Lynn (class of 2016), Alliance Party MLA for North Antrim (2022-2023).
