= Committee for Education =

The Committee for Education is a Northern Ireland Assembly committee established to advise, assist and scrutinise the work of the Department of Education and Minister of Education (currently Paul Givan) on matters within their responsibility as a minister. The committee undertakes a scrutiny, policy development and consultation role and plays a key role in the consideration and development of legislation.

== Membership ==
Membership of the Committee is as follows:

Party	Member	Constituency
Alliance	Nick Mathison MLA (Chairperson)	Strangford
Sinn Féin	Pat Sheehan MLA (Deputy Chairperson)	Belfast West
Sinn Féin	Danny Baker MLA	Belfast West
DUP	David Brooks MLA	Belfast East
UUP	Jon Burrows MLA	North Antrim
Alliance	Michelle Guy MLA	Lagan Valley
SDLP	Cara Hunter MLA	East Londonderry
DUP	Peter Martin MLA	North Down
Sinn Féin	Cathy Mason MLA	South Down

== 2022–2027 Assembly ==
The committee will meet for the first time in the 2022–2027 Assembly on 14 February 2024.

Party	Member	Constituency
Alliance	Nick Mathison MLA (Chairperson)	Strangford
Sinn Féin	Pat Sheehan MLA (Deputy Chairperson)	Belfast West
Sinn Féin	Danny Baker MLA	Belfast West
DUP	David Brooks MLA	Belfast East
DUP	Cheryl Brownlee MLA	East Antrim
UUP	Robbie Butler MLA	Lagan Valley
SDLP	Cara Hunter MLA	East Londonderry
Sinn Féin	Cathy Mason MLA	South Down
Alliance	Kate Nicholl MLA	Belfast South

=== Changes 2022–2027 ===
Date	Outgoing member and party	Constituency	→	New member and party	Constituency
9 September 2024	Kate Nicholl MLA (Alliance)	Belfast South	→	Michelle Guy MLA (Alliance)	Lagan Valley
16 September 2024	Cheryl Brownlee MLA (DUP)	East Antrim	→	Peter Martin MLA (DUP)	North Down
7 October 2024	Robbie Butler MLA (UUP)	Lagan Valley	→	Colin Crawford MLA (UUP)	North Antrim
9 June 2025	David Brooks MLA (DUP)	Belfast East	→	Cheryl Brownlee MLA (DUP)	East Antrim
30 June 2025	Cheryl Brownlee MLA (DUP)	East Antrim	→	David Brooks MLA (DUP)	Belfast East
31 July 2025	Colin Crawford MLA (UUP)	North Antrim	→	Jon Burrows MLA (UUP)	North Antrim
23 September 2025	Peter Martin MLA (DUP)	North Down	→	Gary Middleton MLA (DUP)	Foyle

== 2017–2022 Assembly ==
The committee met for the first time in the 2017–2022 Assembly on 22 January 2020.

Party	Member	Constituency
Alliance	Chris Lyttle MLA (Chairperson)	Belfast East
Sinn Féin	Karen Mullan MLA (Deputy Chairperson)	Foyle
DUP	Maurice Bradley MLA	East Londonderry
UUP	Robbie Butler MLA	Lagan Valley
DUP	William Humphrey MLA	Belfast North
Sinn Féin	Catherine Kelly MLA	West Tyrone
SDLP	Daniel McCrossan MLA	West Tyrone
SDLP	Justin McNulty MLA	Newry and Armagh
DUP	Robin Newton MLA	Belfast East

=== Changes 2017–2022 ===
Date	Outgoing member and party	Constituency	→	New member and party	Constituency
3 November 2020	Catherine Kelly MLA (Sinn Féin)	West Tyrone	→	Nicola Brogan MLA (Sinn Féin)	West Tyrone
3 November 2020	Karen Mullan MLA (Deputy Chairperson, Sinn Féin)	Foyle	→	Pat Sheehan MLA (Deputy Chairperson, Sinn Féin)	Belfast West
21 June 2021	Maurice Bradley MLA (DUP)	East Londonderry	→	Diane Dodds MLA (DUP)	Upper Bann
21 June 2021	William Humphrey MLA (DUP)	Belfast North	→	Harry Harvey MLA (DUP)	Strangford

== 2016–2017 Assembly ==
The committee met for the first time in the 2016–2017 Assembly on 1 June 2016.

Party	Member	Constituency
Sinn Féin	Barry McElduff MLA (Chairperson)	West Tyrone
Alliance	Chris Lyttle MLA (Deputy Chairperson)	Belfast East
UUP	Rosemary Barton MLA	Fermanagh and South Tyrone
DUP	David Hilditch MLA	East Antrim
DUP	Carla Lockhart MLA	Upper Bann
DUP	Phillip Logan MLA	North Antrim
SDLP	Colin McGrath MLA	South Down
DUP	Maurice Morrow MLA	Fermanagh and South Tyrone
UUP	Sandra Overend MLA	Mid Ulster
Sinn Féin	Catríona Ruane MLA	South Down

=== Changes 2016–2017 ===
Date	Outgoing member and party	Constituency	→	New member and party	Constituency
20 June 2016	Caitríona Ruane MLA (Sinn Féin)	South Down	→	Jennifer McCann MLA (Sinn Féin)	Belfast West
6 December 2016	Jennifer McCann MLA (Sinn Féin)	Belfast West	→	Vacant	

== 2011–2016 Assembly ==
The committee met for the first time in the 2011–2016 Assembly on 25 May 2011.

Party	Member	Constituency
DUP	Mervyn Storey MLA (Chairperson)	North Antrim
UUP	David McNarry MLA (Deputy Chairperson)	Strangford
Sinn Féin	Michaela Boyle MLA	West Tyrone
DUP	Jonathan Craig MLA	Lagan Valley
UUP	Jo-Anne Dobson MLA	Upper Bann
Sinn Féin	Phil Flanagan MLA	Fermanagh and South Tyrone
DUP	Brenda Hale MLA	Lagan Valley
Alliance	Trevor Lunn MLA	Lagan Valley
DUP	Michelle McIlveen MLA	Strangford
Sinn Féin	Daithí McKay MLA	North Antrim
SDLP	Conall McDevitt MLA	Belfast South

=== Changes 2011–2016 ===
Date	Outgoing member and party	Constituency	→	New member and party	Constituency
31 January 2012	David McNarry MLA (Deputy Chairperson, UUP)	Strangford	→	Mike Nesbitt MLA (Deputy Chairperson, UUP)	Strangford
17 April 2012	Mike Nesbitt MLA (Deputy Chairperson, UUP)	Strangford	→	Danny Kinahan MLA (Deputy Chairperson, UUP)	South Antrim
23 April 2012	Conall McDevitt MLA (SDLP)	Belfast South	→	Seán Rogers MLA (SDLP)	South Down
10 September 2012	Phil Flanagan MLA (Sinn Féin)	Fermanagh and South Tyrone	→	Daithí McKay MLA (Sinn Féin)	North Antrim
10 September 2012	Chris Hazzard MLA (Sinn Féin)	South Down	→	Pat Sheehan MLA (Sinn Féin)	Belfast West
16 September 2013	Brenda Hale MLA (DUP)	Lagan Valley	→	Michelle McIlveen MLA (DUP)	Strangford
16 September 2013	Robin Newton MLA (DUP)	Belfast East	→	Stephen Moutray MLA (DUP)	Upper Bann
2 December 2013	Michaela Boyle MLA (Sinn Féin)	West Tyrone	→	Maeve McLaughlin MLA (Sinn Féin)	Foyle
4 July 2014	Jo-Anne Dobson MLA (UUP)	Upper Bann	→	Sandra Overend MLA (UUP)	Mid Ulster
24 September 2014	Mervyn Storey MLA (Chairperson, DUP)	North Antrim	→	Michelle McIlveen MLA (Chairperson, DUP)	Strangford
6 October 2014	Stephen Moutray MLA (DUP)	Upper Bann	→	Nelson McCausland MLA (DUP)	Belfast North
17 November 2014	Seán Rogers MLA (SDLP)	South Down	→	Colum Eastwood MLA (SDLP)	Foyle
8 December 2014	Colum Eastwood MLA (SDLP)	Foyle	→	Seán Rogers MLA (SDLP)	South Down
15 June 2015	Danny Kinahan MLA (Deputy Chairperson, UUP)	South Antrim	→	Sandra Overend MLA (Deputy Chairperson, UUP)	Mid Ulster
30 June 2015	Sandra Overend MLA (UUP)	Mid Ulster	→	Ross Hussey MLA (UUP)	West Tyrone
14 September 2015	Ross Hussey MLA (UUP)	West Tyrone	→	Danny Kennedy MLA (UUP)	Newry and Armagh
8 February 2016	Seán Rogers MLA (SDLP)	South Down	→	Dolores Kelly MLA (SDLP)	Upper Bann

== 2007–2011 Assembly ==
The committee met for the first time in the 2007–2011 Assembly on 18 May 2007.

Party	Member	Constituency
DUP	Sammy Wilson MLA (Chairperson)	East Antrim
SDLP	Dominic Bradley MLA (Deputy Chairperson)	Newry and Armagh
SDLP	Mary Bradley MLA	Foyle
Sinn Féin	Paul Butler MLA	Lagan Valley
DUP	Jeffrey Donaldson MLA	Lagan Valley
Alliance	Trevor Lunn MLA	Lagan Valley
UUP	Basil McCrea MLA	Lagan Valley
DUP	Michelle McIlveen MLA	Strangford
Sinn Féin	Michelle O'Neill MLA	Mid Ulster
UUP	Ken Robinson MLA	East Antrim
DUP	Mervyn Storey MLA	North Antrim

=== Changes 2007–2011 ===
Date	Outgoing member and party	Constituency	→	New member and party	Constituency
31 March 2008	Jeffrey Donaldson MLA (DUP)	Lagan Valley	→	Nelson McCausland MLA (DUP)	Belfast North
21 May 2008	Paul Butler MLA (Sinn Féin)	Lagan Valley	→	John O'Dowd MLA (Sinn Féin)	Upper Bann
10 June 2008	Sammy Wilson MLA (Chairperson, DUP)	East Antrim	→	Mervyn Storey MLA (Chairperson, DUP)	North Antrim
17 June 2008	Sammy Wilson MLA (DUP)	East Antrim	→	Edwin Poots MLA (DUP)	Lagan Valley
26 January 2009	Ken Robinson MLA (UUP)	East Antrim	→	Tom Elliott MLA (UUP)	Fermanagh and South Tyrone
22 June 2009	Tom Elliott MLA (UUP)	Fermanagh and South Tyrone	→	John McCallister MLA (UUP)	South Down
14 September 2009	Nelson McCausland MLA (DUP)	Belfast North	→	Alastair Ross MLA (DUP)	East Antrim
14 September 2009	Edwin Poots MLA (DUP)	Lagan Valley	→	Jonathan Craig MLA (DUP)	Lagan Valley
9 November 2010	John McCallister MLA (UUP)	South Down	→	Reg Empey MLA (UUP)	Belfast East
14 April 2010	Dominic Bradley MLA (Deputy Chairperson, SDLP)	Newry and Armagh	→	David Hilditch MLA (Deputy Chairperson, DUP)	East Antrim
14 April 2010	David Hilditch MLA (DUP)	East Antrim	→	Dominic Bradley MLA (SDLP)	Newry and Armagh
14 September 2010	Alastair Ross MLA (DUP)	East Antrim	→	Jonathan Craig MLA (DUP)	Lagan Valley

== 1998-2003 Assembly ==
The committee met for the first time in the 1998-2003 Assembly on 30 November 1999.

Party	Member	Constituency
UUP	Danny Kennedy MLA (Chairperson)	Newry and Armagh
DUP	Sammy Wilson MLA (Deputy Chairperson)	Belfast East
Alliance	Eileen Bell MLA	North Down
UUP	Tom Benson MLA	Strangford
SDLP	John Fee MLA	Newry and Armagh
SDLP	Tommy Gallagher MLA	Fermanagh and South Tyrone
DUP	Oliver Gibson MLA	West Tyrone
SDLP	Patricia Lewsley MLA	Lagan Valley
Sinn Féin	Barry McElduff MLA	West Tyrone
Sinn Féin	Gerry McHugh MLA	Fermanagh and South Tyrone
UUP	Ken Robinson MLA	East Antrim

=== Changes 1998-2003 ===
Date	Outgoing member and party	Constituency	→	New member and party	Constituency
24 December 2000	Tom Benson MLA (UUP)	Strangford	→	Vacant	
29 January 2001	Vacant		→	Tom Hamilton MLA (UUP)	Strangford
21 May 2002	Patricia Lewsley MLA (SDLP)	Lagan Valley	→	Alban Maginness MLA (SDLP)	Belfast North
1 July 2002	Barry McElduff MLA (Sinn Féin)	West Tyrone	→	Mitchel McLaughlin MLA (Sinn Féin)	Foyle
