= Education Committee =

Education Committee may refer to:

- Education Committee (Iceland), a standing committee of the Icelandic parliament
- Education Committee (Sweden), a standing committee of the Riksdag
- Education Select Committee, a standing committee of the Parliament of the United Kingdom
- Gedo Education Committee, a service organization based in Gedo, Somalia
- Standing Committee on Education, Women, Children, Youth and Sports (Parliament of India)

== See also ==
- Committee for Education of the Northern Ireland Assembly
