= James Craig (County Antrim, 20th century) =

Chief whip of the Democratic Unionist Party in the Northern Ireland Assembly
- In office 1973–1974
- Leader: Ian Paisley
- Preceded by: Position created
- Succeeded by: Position abolished

Member of the Northern Ireland Assembly for North Antrim
- In office 28 June 1973 – 1974
- Preceded by: Assembly established
- Succeeded by: Assembly abolished

Member of Carrickfergus Borough Council
- In office 30 May 1973 – 2 November 1974
- Preceded by: Council created
- Succeeded by: Desmond Scott
- Constituency: Carrickfergus Area B

Personal details
- Born: December 1931 Carrickfergus, County Antrim, Northern Ireland
- Died: 2 November 1974 (aged 42)
- Party: Democratic Unionist Party (from 1971)
- Other political affiliations: Independent Unionist (1962 - 1971)

James Anderson Craig (December 1931 – 2 November 1974) was a Northern Irish unionist politician who was a founder member of, and early leading figure in, the Democratic Unionist Party (DUP).

== Background ==
Educated at Larne Grammar School, Craig became a foreman for the Courtaulds company. Although outside the establishment of the Ulster Unionist Party, he was nonetheless able to gain local representation as an Independent Unionist, serving as a member of Carrickfergus Borough Council from 1962 onwards, including a spell as deputy mayor from 1973 to 1974. He also served as a member of the Northern Ireland Housing Council from 1973 to 1974.

He attempted to gain election to the Parliament of Northern Ireland for Carrick in the 1969 election but lost to the UUP's Anne Dickson However Craig's profile rose somewhat with the formation of the DUP in 1971. He was a founder member of the party and also sat on its executive until his death, whilst chairing the Carrickfergus branch of the party. As a consequence Craig was elected to the 1973 Assembly for North Antrim and was DUP chief whip.

Northern Ireland Assembly (1973)
New assembly	Assembly Member for North Antrim; 1973–1974	Assembly abolished
