= Sian Mulholland =

Alliance Party of Northern Ireland MLA

Sian Mulholland MLA
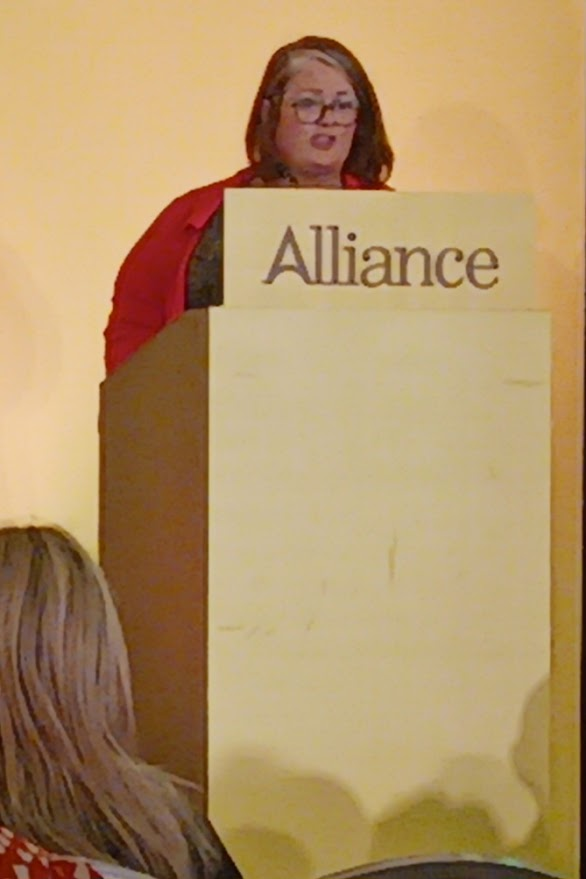

Member of the Northern Ireland Assembly for North Antrim
- Incumbent
- Assumed office 6 April 2023
- Preceded by: Patricia O'Lynn

Member of Lisburn & Castlereagh Council
- In office 26 May 2022 – 6 April 2023
- Preceded by: David Honeyford
- Succeeded by: Claire Kemp
- Constituency: Killutagh

Member of Belfast City Council
- In office 1 September 2015 – 26 May 2022
- Preceded by: Laura McNamee
- Succeeded by: Christine Bower
- Constituency: Ormiston

Personal details
- Born: Sian O'Neill
- Party: Alliance
- Spouse: Kieran Mulholland (m. 2018)
- Children: 3
- Occupation: Politician

Sian Mulholland (née O'Neill) is a Northern Irish politician who has been an Alliance Party Member of the Legislative Assembly (MLA) for North Antrim since April 2023.

== Political career ==
=== Belfast City Council (2015-22) ===
In September 2015, Mulholland was co-opted onto Belfast City Council for the constituency of Ormiston following the resignation of Laura McNamee. Prior to being co-opted, Mulholland worked as a caseworker for Alliance Party leader Naomi Long.

=== Lisburn & Castlereagh Council (2022-23) ===
Mulholland, already a member of Belfast City Council, was co-opted onto Lisburn & Castlereagh Council to fill the vacancy left by David Honeyford's election to the Assembly.

=== Member of the Legislative Assembly (2023-present) ===
On 6 April 2023, Mulholland was sworn in as MLA for North Antrim following the resignation of Patricia O'Lynn.

She contested North Antrim at the 2024 general election, coming fourth and outpolling the Ulster Unionist Party (UUP) candidate, winning 4,488 votes (10.9%).

== Personal life ==
In November 2018, Mulholland married Kieran Mulholland, a Sinn Féin councillor on the Causeway Coast and Glens Borough Council. Mulholland and her husband have two sons and a daughter born five weeks before the restoration of the Northern Ireland Assembly.
