= Phillip Logan =

Politician from Northern Ireland

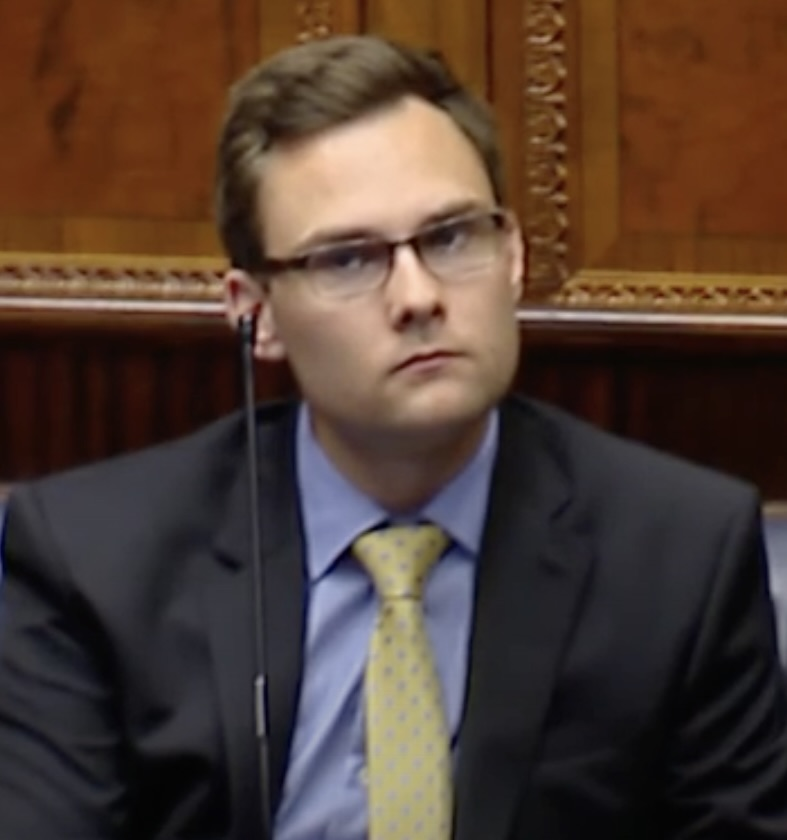
- Logan in 2016

Member of the Legislative Assembly for North Antrim
- In office 5 May 2016 – 2 March 2017
- Preceded by: David McIlveen
- Succeeded by: Seat abolished

Personal details
- Born: 4 July 1989 (age 37) Ahoghill, Northern Ireland
- Party: Democratic Unionist Party

Phillip Logan (born 4 July 1989) is a Democratic Unionist Party (DUP) politician who served as a member of the Northern Ireland Assembly (MLA) for North Antrim from 2016 to 2017.

== Background ==
=== Member of the Northern Ireland Assembly ===
Logan lost his seat in the 2017 Assembly election.

Northern Ireland Assembly
Preceded by David McIlveen	MLA for North Antrim; 2016 – 2017	Seat abolished
