= Ian Paisley Jr =

Northern Irish politician (born 1966)

The Honourable Ian Paisley Jr
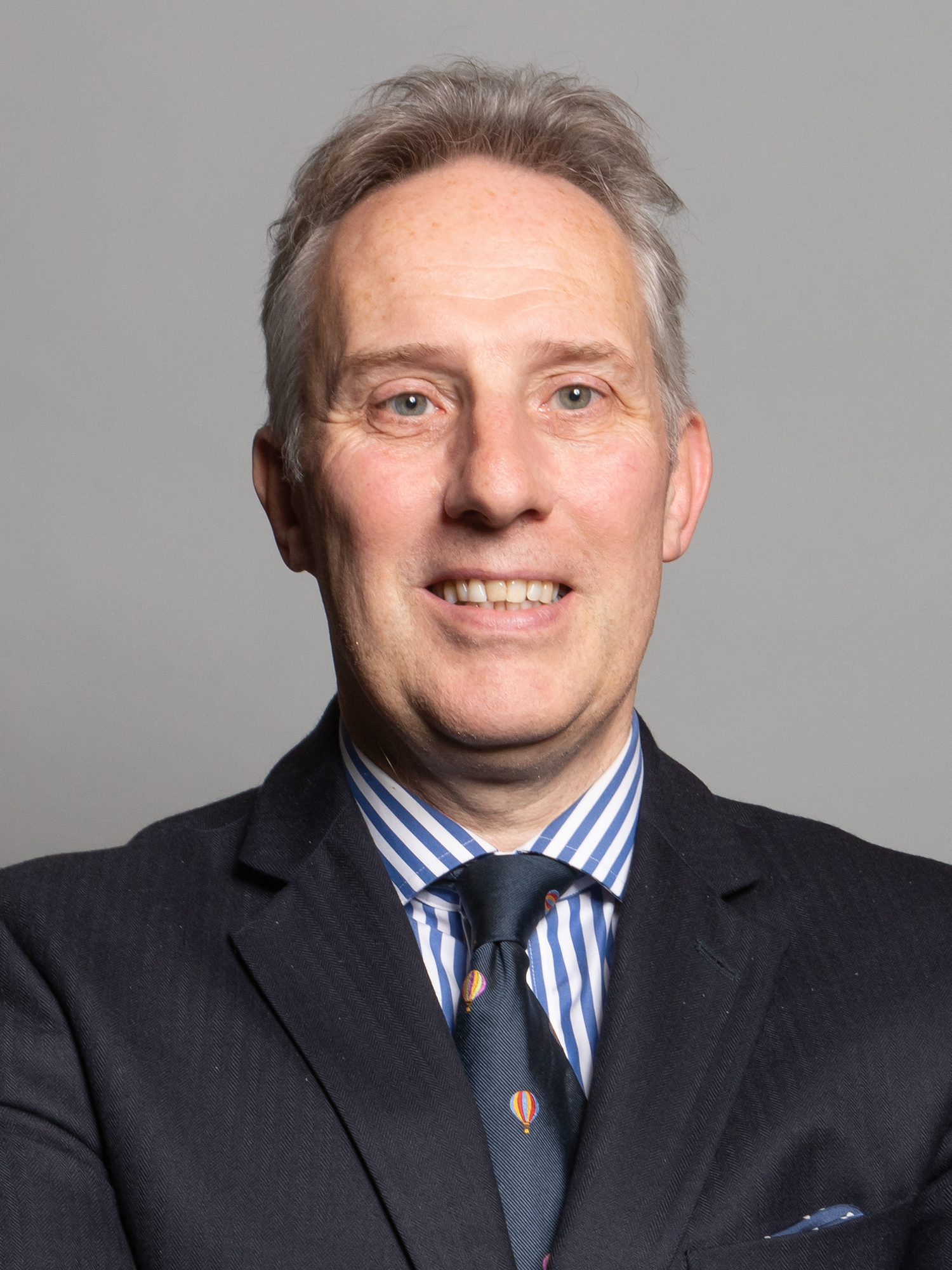
- Official portrait, 2020

Member of Parliament for North Antrim
- In office 6 May 2010 – 30 May 2024
- Preceded by: Ian Paisley
- Succeeded by: Jim Allister

Junior Minister at the Office of the First Minister and deputy First Minister
- In office 8 May 2007 – 26 February 2008 Serving with Gerry Kelly
- Preceded by: James Leslie
- Succeeded by: Jeffrey Donaldson

Member of the Northern Ireland Assembly for North Antrim
- In office 25 June 1998 – 21 June 2010
- Preceded by: Constituency created
- Succeeded by: Paul Frew

Northern Ireland Forum Member for North Antrim
- In office 30 May 1996 – 25 April 1998
- Preceded by: New forum
- Succeeded by: Forum dissolved

Personal details
- Born: Ian Richard Kyle Paisley Jr; 12 December 1966 (age 59) Belfast, Northern Ireland
- Party: Democratic Unionist Party
- Spouse: Fiona Currie (m. 1990)
- Children: 4
- Parents: Ian Paisley (father); Eileen Cassells (mother)
- Education: Queen's University Belfast
- Website: Official website

Ian Richard Kyle Paisley Jr (born 12 December 1966) is a British businessman and former unionist politician. A member of the Democratic Unionist Party (DUP), he served as the Member of Parliament (MP) for North Antrim from 2010 to 2024, and was previously a member of the Northern Ireland Assembly for North Antrim from 1998 to 2010. Paisley is the DUP's Spokesperson for Digital, Culture, Media and Sports. He is a son of the DUP's founder Ian Paisley.

== Childhood ==
Born in Belfast in 1966, Paisley is the youngest child of the Reverend Ian Paisley and his wife Eileen Paisley, Baroness Paisley of St George's. The younger Ian, along with his twin brother (Kyle) and his three elder sisters (Sharon, Rhonda and Cherith), was brought up in a large detached house on Cyprus Avenue in east Belfast. Being the younger of the twins, he was named after his father who was the younger of two brothers. He regularly attended the Free Presbyterian Church of Ulster (where his father preached) from a very young age. In August 2007, he was the subject of the third episode of the BBC Radio 4 series The House I Grew Up In in which he talked about a happy childhood and secure family life, despite the Troubles.

== Education ==
After leaving primary school, Paisley was educated at Shaftesbury House College, and then in the sixth form at Methodist College Belfast, before gaining admission to Queen's University Belfast. There he gained a BA (Hons) in Modern History followed by a MSSc in Irish Politics. After finishing his postgraduate studies, he worked for his father as a political researcher and parliamentary aide.

== Political career ==
In 1996, Paisley was elected to the Northern Ireland Forum for North Antrim. He was returned for the constituency to the Northern Ireland Assembly in 1998. He is one of three DUP members who have taken their seats on the Northern Ireland Policing Board, and is also the party's justice spokesman and press officer.

Paisley successfully ran to succeed his father as the MP for North Antrim in the 2010 UK general election, winning 46.4% of the vote share. Upon his election as MP, he resigned his seat in the Northern Ireland Assembly.

Although there were rumours that Paisley Jr was positioning himself to become leader of his party, he denies any such ambition: "I've no ambition for that at all. I've never had any ambition to get anywhere beyond where I am today. Some people sought to put the knife in, in order to stop me, because they were concerned about me wanting to be leader. Well, they misjudged me completely."

In 2022, Paisley introduced a private members' bill that proposed to alter how future referendums on constitutional change, and thus Northern Ireland's ability to leave the United Kingdom, would be ratified. Paisley's bill would have changed the law so that a simple majority vote would no longer be enough for reunification with Ireland, and instead a higher bar of a supermajority would be required for an affirmative result to be declared. However, Paisley's actions were ridiculed by fellow Northern Irish MPs Stephen Farry and Claire Hanna, who both described it as a political stunt and highlighted that it would never be debated by or voted upon by the UK Parliament.

For the fifth consecutive time, Paisley was re-selected by the DUP for the 2024 general election. With a majority of 12,721 from 2019, he was expected to retain North Antrim, though not without a challenge from the Traditional Unionist Voice leader Jim Allister. He was endorsed by Reform UK leader Nigel Farage, despite the agreed alliance between TUV and Reform. However, in a shock result, he was voted out of office by his own constituents after Allister narrowly defeated Paisley, winning the seat with a majority of 450. In total, he received 11,192 votes (27.2%), a decrease of 23.7%. The loss of North Antrim marked the end of 54 years of the constituency being in the hands of the Paisley family.

In his farewell speech, Paisley said: "The tides of life ebb and flow as we all know. And this certainly is not the script I would've written for tonight, as I think most of you would accept. But I think life is made up of many chapters and I embrace the next chapter as happily as I've embraced the previous chapters. I congratulate my successor I commend all of those who took part in this race – the race to the finish. And I wish them well." On leaving the stage, he refused to speak to the media, instead blowing a kiss as he exited the count centre.

In January 2025, Paisley was among the guests to attend the Second inauguration of Donald Trump.

=== Expenses ===
For the 2011–12 financial year, Paisley's total expenses claim was the seventh-highest of all members of parliament. His expenses for the 2012–13 financial year were £232,000; the highest of any MP that year. The costs covered travel and accommodation for Paisley himself and his constituency staff. In an interview with the Ballymena Times, Paisley stated "None of this money goes to me as MP ... They are legitimate expenses signed off by IPSA and paid directly by the Parliament". He had the second-highest expenses claim in the 2013–14 financial year. For the 2014–15 financial year, he was again the second-highest claimant, receiving £227,000 in expenses. During the 2010–2015 Parliament, Paisley claimed a total of £1,112,667 in expenses.

=== Brexit ===
Paisley strongly supported "Vote Leave" in the 2016 Brexit referendum, and was a supporter of the Eurosceptic campaign Leave Means Leave. While rejecting calls by Republican party Sinn Féin for a referendum in Northern Ireland on a unified Ireland, he advised his constituents to get an Irish passport if they were eligible.

=== Paid advocacy and recall petition ===
In 2018 Paisley was suspended from the House of Commons for 30 sitting days, beginning on 4 September 2018, because he broke paid advocacy rules by receiving hospitality from the Sri Lankan government without declaring that to the Commons. Following his suspension, the Recall of MPs Act 2015 was invoked for the first time since it received Royal Assent. However, the resulting recall petition—the first in British parliamentary history—was signed by only 9.4% of registered voters, below the 10% threshold to trigger a by-election. Paisley's membership of the DUP was suspended between 24 July and 18 September 2018, during internal investigations by the party into his conduct.

=== Electoral Commission fine ===
In September 2020, Paisley was fined £1,300 (€1,400) by the Electoral Commission for accepting a total of £2,600 from two local councils to purchase tables at a fund-raising event at the Tullyglass hotel in Ballymena in September 2017. Paisley also agreed to pay back the money.

=== Association with Jo Bamford ===
In 2019, Paisley helped JCB heir Jo Bamford purchase Wrightbus, the financially troubled manufacturer of London's famous double-decker buses. Jeff Wright, then-owner of Wrightbus, publicly complained of Paisley's alleged interference into the negotiations of the sale of Wrightbus to Bamford. Once the purchase was complete, Bamford publicly praised Paisley for his help.

On 12 October 2019 Paisley wrote an op-ed in the Belfast Telegraph in which he praised Bamford and thanked him for buying Wrightbus.

== Controversy ==
=== Loyalist Volunteer Force rally ===
In March 1998, Paisley and Sammy Wilson spoke at a rally in Portadown organised by the paramilitary Loyalist Volunteer Force (LVF) in opposition to political negotiations preceding the Good Friday Agreement. Their appearance was widely criticised; the rally came hours after the funeral for two men murdered by the LVF, Philip Allen and Damien Trainor – one a Protestant, one a Catholic – in a bar in Poyntzpass, County Armagh, in an indiscriminate sectarian attack. At the rally, Paisley told followers of the late LVF leader Billy Wright "...the sooner this government wakes up to the reality that you can't talk to the Provisional IRA to get peace - the only way to get peace out of the Provisional IRA is to exterminate them, put them out of business".

=== Views on homosexuality ===
In 2005, Paisley came under some criticism for his beliefs about homosexuality and same-sex marriages. Upon learning that David Trimble's aide, Steven King, had married his partner in Canada, Paisley was quoted as saying, "It is really astounding that David Trimble should have had a man such as this giving him advice – and must surely cast grave doubts on his own political judgement. I think these sorts of relationships are immoral, offensive and obnoxious."

Paisley caused further controversy in May 2007 when, in an interview with journalist Jason O'Toole in Hot Press magazine, he said that "I am pretty repulsed by gay and lesbianism. I think it is wrong. I think that those people harm themselves and – without caring about it – harm society. That doesn't mean to say that I hate them – I mean, I hate what they do."

In 2011, Paisley said of his previous comments: "I think I have grown up since then. I have strong Christian beliefs and moral viewpoints, but you have to realise that while sin is black and white, life is a lot of grey. You have to be mature about these things. I can strongly disagree with those viewpoints, but the point is how you disagree."

=== University graduation ===
Paisley was unable to graduate from his MSSc in the summer graduation period, due to having exceeded the word count on his dissertation, and instead graduated in the winter period of 1994. The summer of 1994 was the last year Queen's University Belfast played the British national anthem; Paisley responded by playing the anthem on a tape recorder during his winter graduation.

=== Property developers ===
Paisley had been linked in press reports to local property developer Seymour Sweeney when, in 2007, Sweeney admitted that Paisley had lobbied on his behalf regarding plans for a private visitors' centre at the Giant's Causeway, the only UNESCO World Heritage Site in Northern Ireland. Paisley strongly denied that he had any financial relationship with Sweeney, although he admitted that he had gone deep sea fishing with the developer socially.

Paisley had been involved in the commercial development of the north Antrim coast and strongly supported Alistair Hanna's controversial Bushmills Dunes Golf Resort and Spa proposal, an 18-hole golf course and hotel complex at Runkerry, adjacent to the Giant's Causeway. There were a series of public blunders and further controversy in February 2008, following scrutiny on the employment of family members by politicians after the Derek Conway scandal, when it emerged that Paisley was on his father's payroll as a researcher in the constituency of North Antrim in addition to his roles as an MLA and a junior minister. As a result, Paisley resigned his junior minister position on 18 February 2008.

=== Dissident republican comments ===
Further controversy occurred in August 2008 when Paisley, speaking after a number of attacks on the Police Service of Northern Ireland, said that dissident republicans should be "shot on sight".

=== 2013 Sri Lankan hospitality, and lobbying for a foreign government ===
Paisley visited Sri Lanka twice in 2013, with members of his family; the first occasion was from 30 March until 5 April, and the second from 2 July until 11 July. In their family visa application submitted to the Sri Lanka High Commission in London, all six who travelled declared that the purpose of their visit to Sri Lanka was "official".

In September 2017, The Daily Telegraph alleged that Paisley had received hospitality from the government of Sri Lanka for his two visits there in 2013 without declaring it. It also stated that in 2017 he had been involved in securing a post-Brexit trade deal with that country. However, Paisley replied that the claims were defamatory and that he had referred the matter to his solicitor.

In July 2018, the House of Commons Standards Committee recommended that Paisley be suspended from the Commons for thirty sitting days, for not declaring visits to Sri Lanka paid for by the Sri Lankan government and for breaking the Commons rule banning paid advocacy. The Committee concluded that Paisley's actions amounted to serious misconduct and suggested that his failure to register his visits to Sri Lanka had occurred because he was conscious of the potential embarrassment that would be caused to him if it were to become publicly known that he had accepted very expensive hospitality, for himself and his family, from an overseas government accused of serious human rights violations.

On 24 July 2018, MPs voted to suspend Paisley from the House of Commons for a period of 30 sitting days, beginning on 4 September 2018. His salary was also to be withheld for 30 days. The DUP released a statement confirming that the party officers had decided to suspend him from the party until an internal investigation were held into his conduct. The Speaker of the House of Commons confirmed he would write to the Chief Electoral Officer in Northern Ireland to initiate the MP recall mechanisms, as specified in the Recall of MPs Act 2015. A recall petition opened on 8 August.

On 20 September 2018, the Electoral Office for Northern Ireland announced the recall petition had fallen 444 votes short of the number needed to spark a by-election. Following this result, the DUP announced that it had lifted Ian Paisley's party suspension on 18 September, but had banned him from taking any party office for a year.

=== Criticism of journalist ===
In September 2019, following the publication of an analytical article written by journalist Sam McBride in the Belfast News Letter, concerning the DUP's ongoing negotiations in Stormont, Paisley criticised McBride online, calling him "despicable", "immature", and "simplistic". In response, the National Union of Journalists condemned the remarks as an "unwarranted personal attack" on the journalist. Following further criticism, Paisley apologised, stating that he "expressed [himself] badly".

=== Maldives trip ===
In 2016, Paisley and his family took a holiday to a resort in the Maldives, a trip that he did not disclose as he was required to do. He took the trip months after advocating on behalf the Maldivian government. An investigation concluded that Paisley had failed to properly register the visit, and that his hospitality had likely not been paid for by a friend, as he had claimed. However, he was found not to have broken any rules on "paid advocacy."

== Personal life ==
In 1990, Paisley married Fiona Currie, and they have four children. He is a member of the Free Presbyterian Church of Ulster.

Northern Ireland Forum
New forum	Member for North Antrim; 1996–1998	Forum dissolved
Northern Ireland Assembly
New assembly	MLA for North Antrim; 1998–2010	Succeeded by Paul Frew
Parliament of the United Kingdom
Preceded by Ian Paisley Sr	Member of Parliament for North Antrim; 2010–2024	Succeeded by Jim Allister
Political offices
Vacant Office suspended Title last held by James Leslie	Junior Minister; 2007–2008	Succeeded by Jeffrey Donaldson
