= James Leslie (British politician) =

Member of the Northern Ireland Assembly for North Antrim
- In office 25 June 1998 – 26 November 2003
- Preceded by: New Creation
- Succeeded by: Mervyn Storey

Personal details
- Born: 1 March 1958 Singida, Tanganyika (now part of Tanzania)
- Died: 22 February 2009 (aged 50) Costa Rica
- Party: Ulster Unionist (1996–2006); NI Conservative (2006–2009)
- Spouse: Judena
- Relations: 1
- Education: Queens' College, Cambridge

James Seymour Leslie (1 March 1958 – 22 February 2009) was a Northern Irish unionist politician who served as an Ulster Unionist Party (UUP) Member of the Northern Ireland Assembly (MLA) for North Antrim from 1998 to 2003.

== Background ==
Born in Singida, Tanganyika Territory, and educated at Eton College, Leslie read law and land economy at Queens' College, Cambridge, before becoming a merchant banker.

In 1996, he was an unsuccessful candidate in the Northern Ireland Forum election in North Antrim.

Despite having no experience in politics, Leslie contested North Antrim at the 1997 General election, coming second to the incumbent MP, Democratic Unionist Party (DUP) leader, Ian Paisley.

He later was elected to the Northern Ireland Assembly for North Antrim in the 1998 election.

Leslie did not stand in the 2003 Assembly election. In 2006, he resigned from the UUP and joined the Northern Ireland Conservatives. In the same year, he was appointed High Sheriff of Antrim.

Leslie subsequently stood for the Conservatives in North Down at the 2007 Assembly election, but was not elected. He died aged 50 on 22 February 2009, of a suspected heart attack while on holiday in Costa Rica.

Northern Ireland Assembly
New assembly	MLA for Antrim North; 1998–2003	Succeeded by Mervyn Storey
Political offices
Preceded by Dermot Nesbitt	Junior Minister; 2002	Vacant Office suspended Title next held by Ian Paisley Jr
