= David McIlveen =

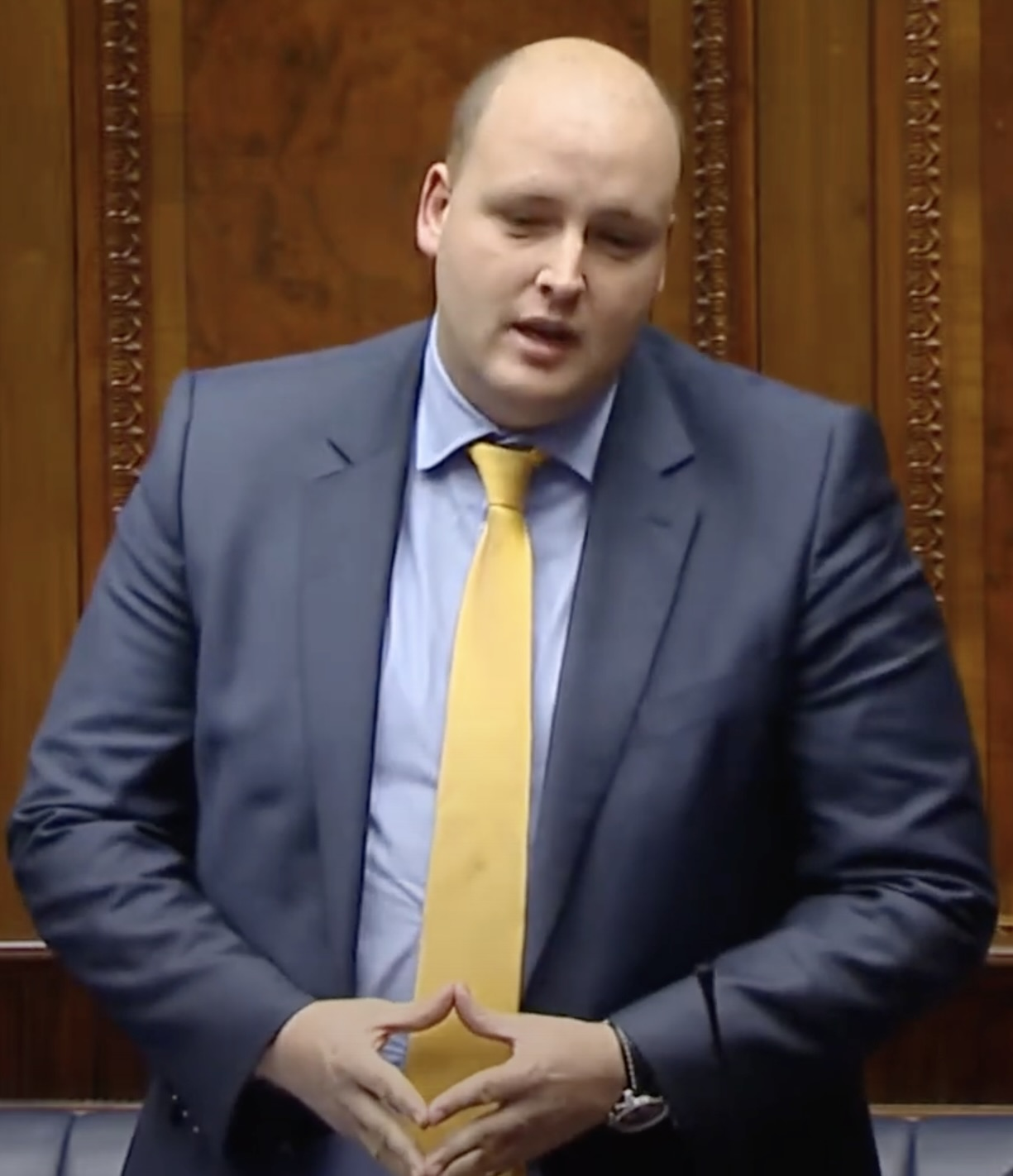
- McIlveen in 2014

Member of the Legislative Assembly for North Antrim
- In office May 2011 – May 2016
- Preceded by: Ian Paisley
- Succeeded by: Phillip Logan

Personal details
- Born: 11 February 1981 (age 45) Belfast, Northern Ireland
- Party: Democratic Unionist Party

David McIlveen (born 11 February 1981) is a British businessman and former Democratic Unionist Party (DUP) politician who was a Member of the Northern Ireland Assembly (MLA) for North Antrim from 2011 to 2016.

== Background ==
=== Assembly career ===
McIlveen was elected to the Northern Ireland Assembly for the North Antrim constituency in 2011.

McIlveen has a keen interest in conflict studies with particular interest in The Middle East. After welcoming the release of captured Israeli soldier Gilad Shalit, he made remarks to The Newsletter claiming Palestinian prisoners were much better treated than Israelis who were snatched at the border by Hamas and given no rights afforded to them in relation to inspections from The Red Cross. Timothy Houston of Queen's University Belfast's Palestine Solidarity Society published an open letter accusing McIlveen of bias and overlooking human rights abuses. David McIlveen claims "close ties with Israel" following boyhood visits with his father, and has visited the region both personally and with political delegations on numerous occasions.

At the 2016 Assembly election, McIlveen lost his seat to running mate, Phillip Logan.

=== Subsequent activity ===
From August 2015-May 2017, McIlveen was a Political Member of the Northern Ireland Policing Board.

He did not campaign publicly with his party for the 2016 Brexit referendum, and described himself as a reformist, rather than leave supporter.

In January 2017, McIlveen criticised then party leader and First Minister, Arlene Foster, over her handling of the Renewable Heating Incentive (RHI) scandal, describing it as an "omnishambles", and that she had "seriously misjudged" public anger over the scheme.

Ahead of the 2017 Assembly election, he endorsed Robin Swann of the Ulster Unionist Party (UUP), rather than any of the DUP candidates, in North Antrim.

Since leaving politics in 2017, McIlveen has returned to private sector and runs various companies mainly aligned to the property sector. He now resides outside of Northern Ireland.

== Personal life ==
He is the son of Rev. David McIlveen, a well-known minister in the Free Presbyterian Church of Ulster. although he has been largely silent on many of the issues linked to his high-profile father.

Northern Ireland Assembly
Preceded by Ian Paisley	MLA for North Antrim; 2011–2016	Succeeded by Phillip Logan
