= Jim Allister =

Northern Irish politician (born 1953)

Jim Allister KC MP
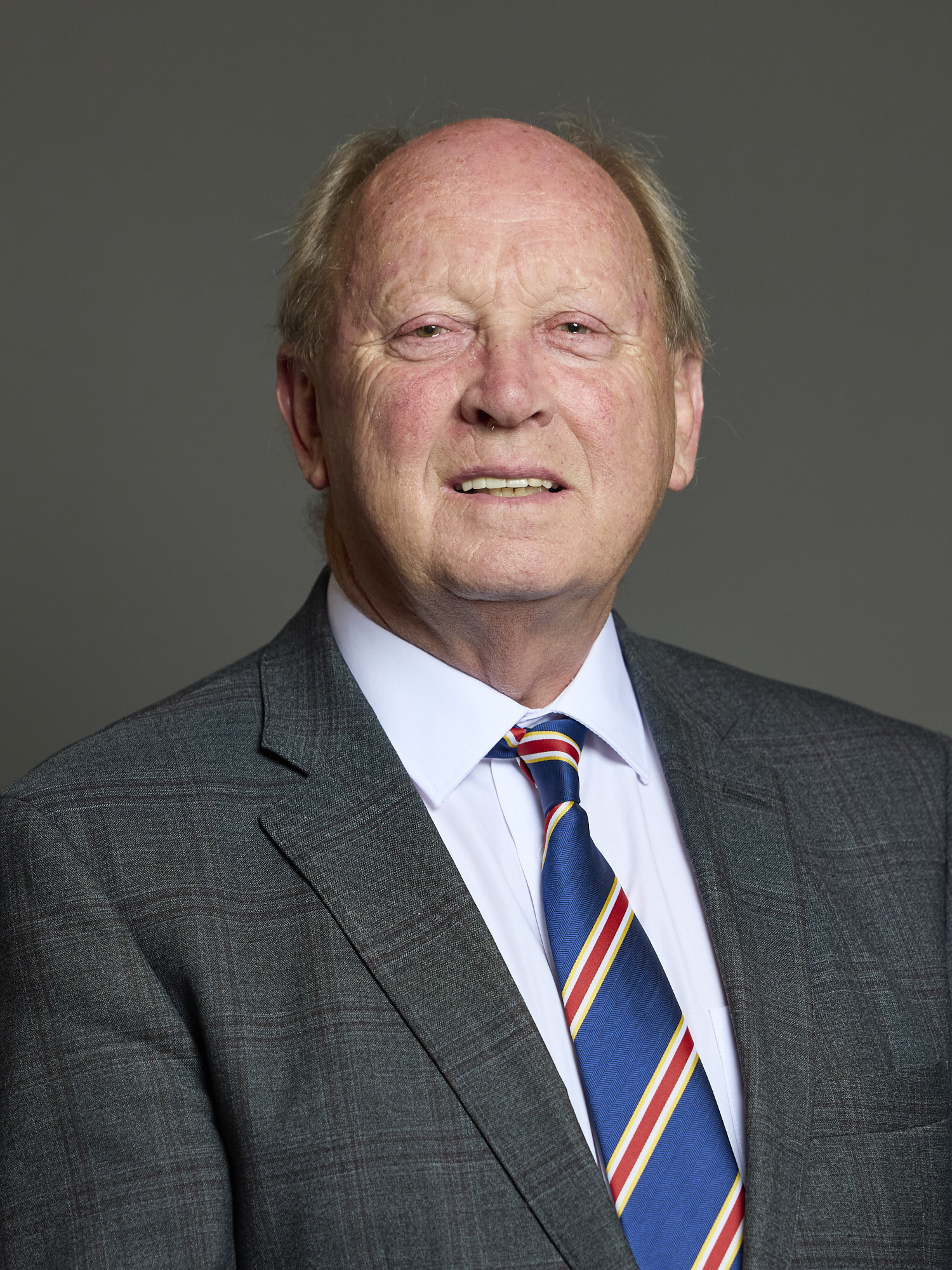
- Official portrait, 2024

Leader of Traditional Unionist Voice
- Incumbent
- Assumed office 7 December 2007
- Deputy: Ron McDowell
- Preceded by: Position created

Member of Parliament for North Antrim
- Incumbent
- Assumed office 4 July 2024
- Preceded by: Ian Paisley Jr
- Majority: 450 (1.1%)

Member of the Legislative Assembly for North Antrim
- In office 5 May 2011 – 5 July 2024
- Preceded by: Declan O'Loan
- Succeeded by: Timothy Gaston
- In office 20 October 1982 – 23 June 1986
- Preceded by: Assembly reconvened
- Succeeded by: Assembly dissolved

Member of the European Parliament for Northern Ireland
- In office 11 July 2004 – 4 June 2009
- Preceded by: Ian Paisley
- Succeeded by: Diane Dodds

Member of Newtownabbey Borough Council
- In office 15 May 1985 – 17 May 1989
- Preceded by: New district
- Succeeded by: John Blair
- Constituency: Doagh Road

Personal details
- Born: James Hugh Allister; 2 April 1953 (age 73) Listooder, County Down, Northern Ireland
- Party: Traditional Unionist Voice (since 2007)
- Other political affiliations: Reform UK–TUV alliance (2024); Democratic Unionist Party (1971–1987; 2004–2007); Official Unionist Party (until 1971)
- Spouse: Ruth McCullagh (m. 1978)
- Children: 3
- Education: Queen's University Belfast
- Profession: Barrister
- Website: www.jimallister.org

James Hugh Allister KC (born 2 April 1953) is a British politician and barrister who has served as Member of Parliament (MP) in the House of Commons for North Antrim since the 2024 general election. He founded the Traditional Unionist Voice (TUV) in 2007 and has led the party since its formation. Prior to his election to Westminster, Allister was a member of the Legislative Assembly (MLA) for North Antrim, having been first elected in the 2011 Assembly election.

Allister had been a member of the Democratic Unionist Party (DUP) since its foundation in 1971, and for which he successfully stood for election in the 2004 European Parliament election for Northern Ireland, succeeding Ian Paisley. He continued as a member of the European Parliament (MEP) following his resignation from the DUP and establishment of the TUV, serving until 2009. He is a supporter of Brexit.

== Early life and education ==
Jim Allister was born on 2 April 1953 in Listooder, near Crossgar in County Down, where he lived until he was nine, when his family moved to Craigantlet, just outside Newtownards. His parents, Robert Allister and Mary Jane Allister (née McCrory), were Protestants from County Monaghan; Robert (1911–1998) was from the townland of Leagh, just south of Monaghan. They had moved northeast to County Down from County Monaghan in 1949 or 1950.

Allister was a pupil at Barnamaghery Primary School and later Dundonald Primary School when he moved house. After attending Regent House Grammar School in Newtownards, Allister graduated from Queen's University Belfast with a Bachelor of Laws degree with honours in constitutional law. In 1974, he unsuccessfully stood for the post of president of Queen's University Belfast Students' Union.

== Student activist ==
Allister quit the Official Unionist Party (OUP) to join the DUP at its founding in 1971. In June 1972, as chairman of the Queen's University Democratic Unionist Party Association, Allister wrote a letter published in the Belfast Telegraph arguing that Ian Paisley was closely aligned with Enoch Powell's "integrationist" stance that Northern Ireland should be closer to the rest of the United Kingdom, and that other unionist leaders were in favour of devolution. In March 1973 Allister was elected to the post of publicity officer for the Queen's DUP Association. He was involved in the 1974 Ulster Workers' Council strike against the Sunningdale Agreement, which had been signed the previous December. A senior loyalist politician recalled walking into the Ulster Workers' Council HQ on Hawthornden Road in Belfast to find Allister and Peter Robinson "giggling" while phoning Social Democratic and Labour Party (SDLP) headquarters claiming to be Catholics in distress in a loyalist area afflicted by the strike and asking the SDLP to send a car to rescue them. He served as a European Parliament assistant to Ian Paisley from 1980 to 1982.

== Elected politician ==
In 1982 he was elected as a member of the Northern Ireland Assembly at Stormont for North Antrim and served as the DUP assembly chief whip. In 1983 Allister stated that if the DUP were faced with a choice between no devolved government and a power-sharing government with the SDLP or other nationalist representatives, his party would opt for not having a devolved government. He was also the vice-chairman of Scrutiny Committee of Department of Finance and Personnel from October 1982 to June 1986. Outside the Stormont Assembly, he was a member of Newtownabbey Borough Council from 1985 to 1987. In 1983, he stood as a DUP candidate in the Westminster election for East Antrim. However, he narrowly lost to Roy Beggs following a bitter campaign in which he denounced Beggs as a "political gypsy" for leaving the DUP and joining the OUP; Beggs had resigned from the DUP after leading a Larne council delegation to Dún Laoghaire in the Republic of Ireland.

In July 1984, Allister gave a speech at the unveiling of a loyalist mural in a housing estate in the Ballykeel area of Ballymena, County Antrim. Ian Paisley was unable to attend but Eileen Paisley came in his stead. Speaking to a crowd of assembled loyalists in Orkney Drive, Allister said; "There are those in this estate who do not like the red, white and blue. To those people and to everyone else who would betray us, the Ulster Loyalists say: 'No surrender'." Later, a crowd gathered outside the home of a Catholic family who lived in Orkney Drive, a married couple with six children, and pelted the house with stones, smashing windows and damaging the family car. The father, Ivan Smith, was also reportedly punched and kicked. The Smith family, who had lived in the area for thirteen years, fled shortly afterwards and were later rehoused. The SDLP called for the speech to be considered by the Department of Public Prosecutions under incitement to hatred laws, linking the speech to increased tensions in the area and the expulsion of the local Catholic family. Allister dismissed the SDLP statement as a "publicity stunt" and declared his earlier remarks were "factual".

In August 1985, Allister attended the first major meeting of the United Ulster Loyalist Front (UULF) in Portadown. The UULF had originally formed as a committee earlier that year to oppose police plans to reroute traditional Orange Order parades away from nationalist areas of Portadown. The UULF was supported by the paramilitary organisation the Ulster Defence Association (UDA) with South Belfast Brigade chief and UDA deputy leader John McMichael being appointed to the coordinating committee. Unionists blamed the Irish government for loyalist parades being rerouted from predominantly Catholic areas and the UULF's stated purpose was to oppose further perceived interference from Dublin, although the group's secretary told the press ahead of the meeting that "[he] would not expect paramilitary action to be decided tonight".

== Politics after Anglo-Irish Agreement ==
Following the signing of the Anglo-Irish Agreement in November 1985 by the Thatcher and FitzGerald governments, he was a high-profile opponent of the treaty. He was a member of the Joint Unionist Working Party, a body set up by his party and the Ulster Unionist Party (UUP) to oversee the unionist campaign against the agreement. During the one-day loyalist strike against the agreement in March 1986 it was reportedly difficult for journalists to move around the "loyalist stronghold" of Larne without the permission of Allister. He was also very vocal in his criticism of Royal Ulster Constabulary (RUC) chief constable John Hermon; the Irish Independent wrote in June 1986 that most of the statements sent by Allister with regards to the chief constable could not be printed "having regards to the law of defamation and libel". In May 1986 Allister led thirteen other DUP politicians in an occupation of the telephone exchange at Parliament Buildings at Stormont and blocked calls from going through to government departments. The siege ended after the RUC used a sledgehammer to breach the barricaded door.

Allister and then DUP deputy leader Peter Robinson held a press conference in September that year threatening to declare Northern Ireland independent from the United Kingdom if the Anglo-Irish Agreement was not withdrawn. In November 1986 the SDLP called for Allister and other unionist politicians to be prosecuted for incitement following a "violent" speech at a DUP demonstration in Carrickfergus. The crowd subsequently attacked Catholic property resulting in the death of an elderly Catholic woman.

That same month Allister organised a rally inaugurating the Ballymena battalion of a new loyalist paramilitary group, Ulster Resistance. Allister, DUP deputy leader Peter Robinson, and Ulster Clubs chairman Alan Wright led hundreds of loyalists, many wearing paramilitary uniforms and some wearing masks, parading in a show of strength that culminated at Ballymena Town Hall, where DUP leader Ian Paisley was waiting. Inside Paisley donned a red Ulster Resistance beret on stage, daring the RUC to arrest him while Allister pledged his "personal support" to Ulster Resistance.

Allister claimed that the RUC had erected a "ring of steel" around the town in an attempt to prevent them from marching to the site of the meeting; he was cheered when he informed the gathered crowd that the colour party had instead entered the town through adjoining fields. The RUC denied any undue holdups and stated no arrests were made. When questioned by the press Allister declined to say how many were in attendance but claimed that Ulster Resistance rallies seemed to grow in size every night, declaring:

The only problem we have is that we are getting too many [Ulster Resistance] volunteers and we may have to slow down the recruiting process.

His departure from active politics in June 1987 followed a reported disagreement with Paisley over a voting pact with James Molyneaux's UUP. The situation resembled fellow unionist politician and barrister Robert McCartney's in the North Down constituency. McCartney was expelled from the UUP around the same time for not accepting the policy of the leadership.

== Legal career ==
Allister was called to the Bar of Northern Ireland as a barrister in 1976, specialising in criminal law. In 2001, he was called to the Inner Bar as Queen's Counsel.

In 2003, he represented Loyalist Volunteer Force member Clifford McKeown in court in a case regarding the 1996 murder of Catholic taxi driver Michael McGoldrick. McKeown was found guilty of the murder by the court. Allister said that McKeown would be appealing against the conviction.

During the trial, Allister cross-examined journalist Nick Martin-Clark, who had reported that McKeown had confessed to the murder and declined to identify his sources. Allister said that the McGoldrick case was one of the most notable cases of his legal career, recalling that he had cross-examined a witness for 13 days.

His legal practice also included civil and planning work. In evidence to the high court in 2010, Allister stated that while serving as a Member of the European Parliament he had undertaken approximately 12 civil cases, including a complex brain-injury case, as well defamation and libel proceedings, a tribunal appearance and three panel appeals.

== Member of the European Parliament ==
Allister returned to the DUP in 2004 and successfully ran as the party's candidate in Northern Ireland at the 2004 European Parliament election in the United Kingdom, topping the poll with 175,000 first-preference votes, 32 per cent of the total.

It is reported that he participated in more parliamentary debates and asked more questions than his fellow Northern Irish MEPs Bairbre de Brún of Sinn Féin and Jim Nicholson of the Ulster Unionist Party. Allister was also active as a member of the European Parliament Fisheries Committee and was ranked by the pressure group TaxPayers' Alliance as the most "hard-working, transparent and pro-taxpayer" of the 75 United Kingdom MEPs during the 2004–2009 European Parliament.

On 27 March 2007, Allister resigned from the DUP because of the party's decision to enter into government with Sinn Féin. It was the second occasion on which he had resigned from the party.

In late 2007, there was speculation that Allister might found a new unionist political party. He launched the Traditional Unionist Voice (TUV) on 7 December 2007.

In the 2009 European Parliament election in the United Kingdom, this time standing as a TUV candidate, Allister polled 13.5 per cent of the first-preference votes cast but was not re-elected.

== Leader of the TUV ==
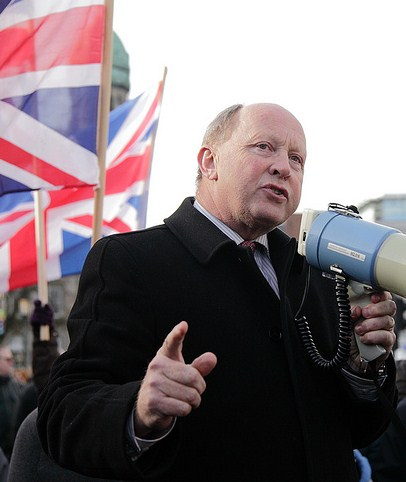
Allister speaking in Belfast in 2013

Jim Allister stood as a TUV candidate in the 2010 Westminster parliamentary election in the North Antrim constituency. Having polled well in the previous year's European election, Allister stood a chance of winning the seat. This would have been a tremendous loss to the DUP, as it has historically been the party's safest seat and the seat of DUP founder and former party leader Ian Paisley. Allister came second in the poll with 7,114 votes to the DUP's Ian Paisley Jr who polled 19,672 votes.

Allister is a vocal critic of the A5 Western Transport Corridor, and said in 2010 a proposed bypass around Dungiven on the A6 would destroy some Protestant-owned farms and suggested this was planned "in order to avoid the more direct route which would disrupt the GAA facilities".

Allister returned to the Northern Ireland Assembly at the 2011 election, being the last candidate elected in North Antrim.

In 2012, the year after his return to the Assembly, Allister established at Parliament Buildings in Belfast an annual event to mark the European Day of Remembrance of Victims of Terrorism – each year on the anniversary of the Madrid bombings of 11 March 2004, the European Union remembers the victims of terrorist attacks across the world.

In August 2012, Allister called the Parades Commission "little Hitlers" when they placed restrictions on a loyalist parade.

In June 2013, a private member's bill proposed by Allister – the Civil Service (Special Advisers) Bill – was voted into law by the Northern Ireland Assembly. The bill's aim was to tighten the rules governing appointment of special advisers (SPADS) by ministers of the Northern Ireland government. Amongst other things, the new law debarred anyone convicted of an offence carrying a jail sentence of five years or more from appointment as a SPAD. Allister said that he was inspired to introduce the bill by the example of Ann Travers who had protested against the appointment, in 2011, of former IRA member Mary McArdle to the position of special adviser by the then Sinn Féin minister for culture and arts. McArdle had been convicted for her part in the 1972 murder of Mary Travers and the serious wounding of her father, Tom Travers, a Belfast magistrate. Some years later, Allister recalled: "I labelled it 'Ann's Law' because that's a proper tribute to the driving force behind it. That's probably my proudest moment as a politician … to have left on the statute book the first victory in years for innocent victims."

Allister holds conservative views on social policy, and is a supporter of the evangelical creationist lobby group, the Caleb Foundation.

He ran again for Northern Ireland at the 2014 European Parliament election, receiving 75,806 first-preference votes (12.1%), a decrease of 1.6%.

At the 2016 Assembly election, Allister topped the poll in North Antrim, and was elected on the seventh count.

In November 2016, Allister opposed a motion pardoning gay men convicted for formerly illegal homosexual acts.

In February 2021, the Functioning of Government (Miscellaneous Provisions) Bill was passed by a vote in the Northern Ireland Assembly. Introduced as a private member's bill by Jim Allister, the bill's primary aim was to correct dysfunctional behaviour by ministers, special advisers and civil servants who ran the government of Northern Ireland. The Coghlin Report (March 2020) into the Renewable Heating Incentive scheme scandal had proposed 44 recommendations for improvement in the functioning of the Northern Ireland government and its civil service. The NI Executive and Assembly had responded to this report by creating a new code of conduct to address these failures. But Allister was of the opinion that this was insufficient and that law, rather than guidance, was necessary to remedy the problems identified in the report. The bill he proposed was complex, detailed and led to much debate in the Northern Ireland Assembly but most of its content was eventually approved, with only one of the parties in the assembly objecting to all of its content.

As a result of the new law, written records of all governmental meetings were to be taken by civil servants, confidential government business was no longer to be discussed via private email accounts, sharing of confidential information which could be used for private financial gain was to be a criminal offence, ministers and special advisers were to sign a registry of interests which would show whether their personal financial interest overlapped with their elected responsibilities, and the appointment of so-called 'super-spads' by a political party rather than via the normal civil service appointment procedures was prohibited. Finally, the first minister and deputy first minister were to produce a report, every two years, regarding the functional performance of the government, its departments and attached civil service personnel.

An August 2021, opinion poll by the polling company LucidTalk found a large rise in support for Allister's party the TUV to 14% of first preference vote intentions in the upcoming May 2022 Northern Ireland Assembly elections. TUV failed to win any new seats in the election, despite increasing their overall vote by 5.0%. Allister was re-elected in North Antrim on the fifth count, polling 8,282 first-preferences (16.4%). Expressing his disappointment during the count, he said: “We have 7.6 percent of the vote, a massive increase, but that is not reflected in the number of seats. It is very disappointing when you collect 4–5,000 votes or more in many other constituencies that it doesn't translate into seats because of the vagaries of the system.”

Allister supports Christian religious education and collective worship in schools.

== Member of Parliament ==
In March 2024, the TUV formed an electoral alliance with the right-wing populist party Reform UK, under which they would stand agreed candidates in Northern Ireland at the 2024 United Kingdom general election. Allister later confirmed that he would be contesting the North Antrim constituency for the TUV–Reform alliance. North Antrim had long been regarded as one of the safest DUP constituencies, having been held by Ian Paisley Jr since the 2010 United Kingdom general election and previously his father Ian Paisley since the 1970 United Kingdom general election. Allister defeated Ian Paisley Jr by 450 votes and gave the TUV its first victory in a Westminster election.

Following his election, there was speculation as to whether Allister would sit as a Reform UK MP, alongside their five MPs in the commons. While announcing the former deputy mayor of Mid and East Antrim, Timothy Gaston, as his successor in the Assembly, Allister confirmed that he would not be formally taking the Reform whip, but would do so when supporting the party on 'agreed issues'.

In June 2025, Allister voted against the Terminally Ill Adults (End of Life) Bill.

A poll by LucidTalk in August 2025 found Allister to be the most popular leader among unionist voters. Additionally, the TUV were also found to have secured enough support to overtake both the Alliance Party and UUP for the first time, becoming the third-most popular party. The poll showed that 13% of voters intended to vote TUV at the next Assembly election.

In May 2026, Allister attracted criticism after a graphic posted on his social media accounts depicted people of colour on a bus crossing from the Republic of Ireland into Northern Ireland, holding signs reading "free housing" and "free money". The Alliance Party described the imagery as racist.

== Political positions ==
Allister's political positions have been described as right-wing populist, Eurosceptic, anti-immigration, anti-Good Friday agreement, hard-line Unionist, Trumpian and socially conservative by media outlets.

Allister is widely viewed as firmly opposed to the Good Friday Agreement. Many Unionists view him as uncompromising and principled. Allister left the DUP and founded the Traditional Unionist Voice in 2007 because he believed the DUP had abandoned its long-standing opposition to the Good Friday Agreement by agreeing to share power with Sinn Féin under the St Andrews Agreement.

Allister is staunchly pro-life, voting against abortion liberalisation and assisted-dying legislation in Westminster. Allister is strongly opposed to same-sex marriage stating: "I will, robustly and with conviction, whatever the popularism might be, defend with my vote the right of traditional marriage." Allister has described transgender identity as based in an "extreme irrationality" that "defies common sense."

Allister is strongly Eurosceptic and opposed to the Lisbon Treaty, Maastricht and deeper EU Political Union. Allister is a strong supporter of Brexit. In May 2026, Allister gained media attention after his intervention in the King's speech debate, warning Prime Minister Sir Keir Starmer that Northern Ireland's loss of democratic control is being replicated across the rest of the UK. Allister is an opponent of Rishi Sunak's Windsor Framework and the resulting trade border in the Irish Sea.

On immigration, Allister has taken a hard-line stance, arguing against uncontrolled migration to the UK. After a violent attack in Belfast carried out by an immigrant, Allister described certain people coming into the United Kingdom as being from an "alien culture". The remark attracted criticism from Northern Ireland Secretary Hilary Benn. Allister raised concern to the issue that migrants were coming into Northern Ireland from the Republic of Ireland on buses, meaning they were not subject to checks. His party pledged to "stop the buses".

On the economy, Allister states that the NI economy is overly reliant on the public sector and consistently advocates for policies that encourage investment and private-sector growth. Allister also argues for fiscal restraint and argues that Northern Ireland should live within its means, and is sceptical of large-scale economic programmes that he characterises as "dependency economics". Allister condemns the removal of the Movement Assistance Scheme (MAS), and warns it worsens the Irish sea border costs, increases trade diversion, breaches legal obligations, and argues only removing the border through Mutual Enforcement will solve the problem.

Allister has stated that climate change has been "over sold and exaggerated" and believes there is "an element of exploitation by government and vested interests in the whole green agenda."

Allister has said that he believes creationism should be taught in schools, stating: “I certainly find it incomprehensible to accept that the beautiful world we have around us is a product of puff smoke or a big bang. I think both are entitled to be taught, and I don’t think one should be excluded.”

== Personal life ==
Allister married Ruth McCullagh on 14 July 1978. They live in Kells, County Antrim, and have two sons and a daughter. He is a member of the Free Presbyterian Church of Ulster.

Northern Ireland Assembly (1982)
New assembly	Member of the Parliamentary Assembly for North Antrim; 1982–1986	Assembly abolished
European Parliament
Preceded by Ian Paisley	Member of the European Parliament for Northern Ireland; 2004–2009	Succeeded by Diane Dodds
Northern Ireland Assembly
Preceded by Declan O'Loan	Member of the Legislative Assembly for North Antrim; 2011–2024	Succeeded by Timothy Gaston
Parliament of the United Kingdom
Preceded by Ian Paisley Jr	Member of Parliament for North Antrim; 2024–present	Incumbent
