= Mervyn Storey =

British politician

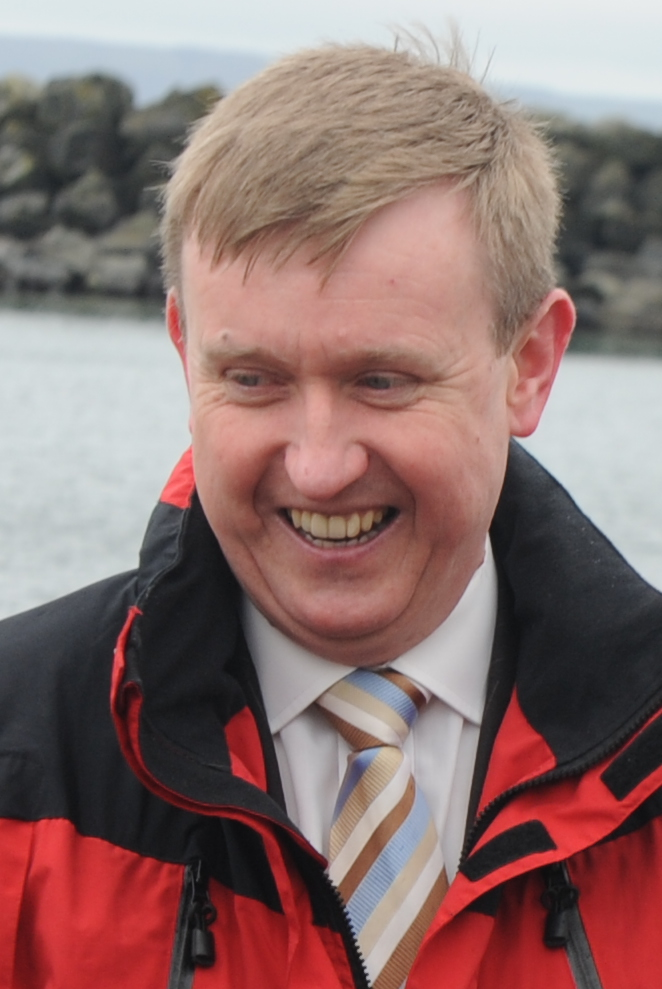

Member of Causeway Coast and Glens Borough Council
- Incumbent
- Assumed office 25 August 2022
- Preceded by: John Finlay
- Constituency: Ballymoney

Minister for Finance & Personnel
- In office 13 January 2016 – 30 March 2016
- Preceded by: Arlene Foster
- Succeeded by: Máirtín Ó Muilleoir

Minister for Social Development
- In office 24 September 2014 – 12 January 2016
- Preceded by: Nelson McCausland
- Succeeded by: Lord Morrow

Member of the Northern Ireland Assembly for North Antrim
- In office 26 November 2003 – 28 March 2022
- Preceded by: James Leslie
- Succeeded by: Patricia O'Lynn

Personal details
- Born: 4 September 1964 (age 61) Armoy, County Antrim, Northern Ireland
- Party: Democratic Unionist Party
- Spouse: Christine Storey
- Children: 3

Robert Mervyn Storey (born 4 September 1964), usually known as Mervyn Storey, is a Democratic Unionist Party (DUP) politician, serving as a Causeway Coast and Glens Councillor for the Ballymoney DEA since 2022. Storey previously served in the Northern Ireland Executive, where he was Minister for Social Development from 2014 to 2016, and then Minister for Finance between January and March 2016. He was a Member of the Legislative Assembly (MLA) for North Antrim from 2003 to 2022.

== Biography ==
Robert Mervyn Storey was born in Armoy, County Antrim on 4 September 1964. His father Nat was a founder member of the Protestant Unionist Party and an election worker for Ian Paisley. Storey was educated at Armoy Primary School and at Ballymoney High School. On leaving school in 1980 he worked in a bacon factory, rising to production manager. In 2000 he left the company and joined Ian Paisley's constituency office in Ballymena.

== Family ==
Storey is married to Christine and has three children.

== Political activity ==
Storey is a former member of the Fire Authority for Northern Ireland. Storey was elected to Ballymoney council in 2001 and again in 2005. He is a member of the Ballymoney Local Strategy Partnership and Regional Partnership for Northern Ireland. In 2000 he served as campaign manager for William McCrea's by-election for South Antrim and also in 2001 for Gregory Campbell and Ian Paisley's elections in East Londonderry and North Antrim respectively. All three campaigns were successful.

Storey was elected to the Northern Ireland Assembly in the 2003 elections. From 2008 to 2014 he was chairman of the Northern Ireland Assembly Committee for Education. He lost his Assembly seat in the election held on 5 May 2022, thus ceasing to be an MLA.

From September 2014 to January 2016 Storey was Minister for Social Development. He resigned from this post several times during September and October 2015 in the context of a political crisis.

In January 2016 Storey was appointed Minister for Finance & Personnel.

As a young earth creationist, and a member of the "Council of Reference" of the creationist Caleb Foundation, he petitioned the then Northern Irish education minister, Caitríona Ruane, to have intelligent design taught in schools in Northern Ireland, as well as objecting to an exhibition on evolution in the Ulster Museum and signs at the Giants Causeway in his North Antrim constituency.

Northern Ireland Assembly
Preceded by James Leslie	MLA for North Antrim; 2003–2022	Succeeded by Patricia O’Lynn
Political offices
Preceded by Nelson McCausland	Minister for Social Development; 2014–2016	Succeeded by Lord Morrow
Preceded by Arlene Foster	Minister for Finance & Personnel; 2016	Succeeded by Máirtín Ó Muilleoir
