= North Antrim (Assembly constituency) =

Constituency of the Northern Ireland Assembly

Coordinates: 54.964°N 6.174°W

- Northern Ireland Assembly constituency
- North Antrim shown within Northern Ireland

Current constituency
- Created: 1973
- Seats: 6 (1996–2016); 5 (2017–)
- MLAs: Jon Burrows (UUP); Paul Frew (DUP); Timothy Gaston (TUV); Philip McGuigan (SF); Sian Mulholland (APNI)
- Districts: Mid and East Antrim Borough Council; Antrim and Newtownabbey Borough Council

North Antrim is a constituency in the Northern Ireland Assembly.

The seat was first used for a Northern Ireland-only election for the Northern Ireland Assembly, 1973. It usually shares boundaries with the North Antrim UK Parliament constituency, however the boundaries of the two constituencies were slightly different from 1983 to 1986 as the Assembly boundaries had not caught up with Parliamentary boundary changes.

In 1996 members of the Northern Ireland Forum were elected from the newly drawn Parliamentary constituencies but the 51st Parliament of the United Kingdom, elected in 1992 under the 1983–95 constituency boundaries, was still in session. However the boundaries of North Antrim were not changed in the 1996–1997 redistribution.

Members were elected from the constituency to the 1975 Constitutional Convention, the 1982 Assembly, the 1996 Forum and then to the current Assembly from 1998.

For further details of the history and boundaries of the constituency, see North Antrim (UK Parliament constituency).

== Members ==
Election	MLA (party)	MLA (party)	MLA (party)	MLA (party)	MLA (party)	MLA (party)	MLA (party)	MLA (party)
1973	John O'Hagan (SDLP)	William Craig (Vanguard)	John Baxter (UUP)	Hugh Wilson (Alliance Party)	David McCarthy (UUP)	Ian Paisley (DUP)	James Craig (DUP)	
1974 by-election	John O'Hagan (SDLP)	William Craig (Vanguard)	John Baxter (UUP)	Hugh Wilson (Alliance Party)	Clifford Smyth (DUP)	Ian Paisley (DUP)	James Craig (DUP)	
1975	John Turnley (SDLP)	William Wright (Vanguard)	David Allen (Vanguard)	Hugh Wilson (Alliance Party)	Clifford Smyth (DUP)	Ian Paisley (DUP)	Ken McFaul (DUP)	
1982	Sean Farren (SDLP)	Joe Gaston (UUP)	Roy Beggs (UUP)	Seán Neeson (Alliance Party)	Jim Allister (DUP)	Ian Paisley (DUP)	Cecil Cousley (DUP)	Jack McKee (DUP)
1996	Sean Farren (SDLP)	Joe Gaston (UUP)	Robert Coulter (UUP)	5 seats 1996–1998	Ian Paisley Jr (DUP)	Ian Paisley (DUP)		
1998	Sean Farren (SDLP)	James Leslie (UUP)	Robert Coulter (UUP)	Gardiner Kane (DUP)	Ian Paisley Jr (DUP)	Ian Paisley (DUP)		
2003	Sean Farren (SDLP)	Philip McGuigan (Sinn Féin)	Robert Coulter (UUP)	Mervyn Storey (DUP)	Ian Paisley Jr (DUP)	Ian Paisley (DUP)		
2007	Declan O'Loan (SDLP)	Daithí McKay (Sinn Féin)	Robert Coulter (UUP)	Mervyn Storey (DUP)	Ian Paisley Jr (DUP)	Ian Paisley (DUP)		
June 2010 co-option	Declan O'Loan (SDLP)	Daithí McKay (Sinn Féin)	Robert Coulter (UUP)	Mervyn Storey (DUP)	Paul Frew (DUP)	Ian Paisley (DUP)		
2011	Jim Allister (TUV)	Daithí McKay (Sinn Féin)	Robin Swann (UUP)	Mervyn Storey (DUP)	Paul Frew (DUP)	David McIlveen (DUP)		
2016	Jim Allister (TUV)	Daithí McKay (Sinn Féin)	Robin Swann (UUP)	Mervyn Storey (DUP)	Paul Frew (DUP)	Phillip Logan (DUP)		
August 2016 co-option	Jim Allister (TUV)	Philip McGuigan (Sinn Féin)	Robin Swann (UUP)	Mervyn Storey (DUP)	Paul Frew (DUP)	Phillip Logan (DUP)		
2017	Jim Allister (TUV)	Philip McGuigan (Sinn Féin)	Robin Swann (UUP)	Mervyn Storey (DUP)	Paul Frew (DUP)			
2022	Jim Allister (TUV)	Philip McGuigan (Sinn Féin)	Robin Swann (UUP)	Patricia O'Lynn (Alliance Party)	Paul Frew (DUP)			
April 2023 co-option	Jim Allister (TUV)	Philip McGuigan (Sinn Féin)	Robin Swann (UUP)	Sian Mulholland (Alliance Party)	Paul Frew (DUP)			
July 2024 co-options	Timothy Gaston (TUV)	Philip McGuigan (Sinn Féin)	Colin Crawford (UUP)	Sian Mulholland (Alliance Party)	Paul Frew (DUP)			
August 2025 co-option	Timothy Gaston (TUV)	Philip McGuigan (Sinn Féin)	Jon Burrows (UUP)	Sian Mulholland (Alliance Party)	Paul Frew (DUP)			

Note: The columns in this table are used only for presentational purposes, and no significance should be attached to the order of columns. For details of the order in which seats were won at each election, see the detailed results of that election.

== Elections ==
=== Northern Ireland Assembly ===
==== 2027 ====
2027 Assembly election: North Antrim – 5 seats
Party	Candidate	FPv%	Count
Party	Candidate	FPv%	1
DUP	Paul Frew		
TUV	Timothy Gaston		
Sinn Féin	Philip McGuigan		
Alliance	Sian Mulholland		
DUP	Darryl Wilson		
TUV	Kirk Wilson		

==== 2022 ====
2022 Assembly election: North Antrim – 5 seats
Party	Candidate	FPv%	Count					
Party	Candidate	FPv%	1	2	3	4	5	6
UUP	**Robin Swann**	18.83%	**9,530**					
Sinn Féin	**Philip McGuigan**	18.47%	**9,348**					
TUV	**Jim Allister**	16.36%	8,282	8,412	8,425	8,427	**8,626**	
DUP	**Paul Frew**	12.33%	6,242	6,322	6,334	6,335	6,559	**8,099**
Alliance	**Patricia O'Lynn**	9.50%	4,810	4,908	5,155	5,432	5,797	**8,023**
DUP	Mervyn Storey	13.33%	6,747	6,840	6,850	6,853	7,086	7,735
TUV	Matthew Armstrong	4.90%	2,481	2,501	2,504	2,504	2,726	
SDLP	Eugene Reid	3.79%	1,919	1,940	1,998	2,615	2,662	
UUP	Bethany Ferris	1.69%	856	1,439	1,465	1,468		
Green (NI)	Paul Veronica	0.68%	343	350				
Independent	Laird Shingleton	0.13%	66	69				
Electorate: 81,935 Valid: 50,624 (61.79%) Spoilt: 596 Quota: 8,438 Turnout: 51,220 (62.51%)

==== 2017 ====
2017 Assembly election: North Antrim – 5 seats
Party	Candidate	FPv%	Count						
Party	Candidate	FPv%	1	2	3	4	5	6	7
Sinn Féin	**Philip McGuigan**	15.80%	7,600	7,601	7,729	7,769	7,960	**9,780**	
UUP	**Robin Swann**	12.52%	6,022	6,032	6,049	6,127	6,966	**8,413**	
TUV	**Jim Allister**	12.92%	6,214	6,215	6,229	7,564	7,679	7,834	**7,989**
DUP	**Paul Frew**	14.50%	6,975	6,977	6,984	7,055	7,135	7,199	**7,231**
DUP	**Mervyn Storey**	14.26%	6,857	6,863	6,868	6,896	6,965	7,013	**7,066**
DUP	Phillip Logan	11.87%	5,708	5,709	5,711	5,776	5,810	5,840	5,860
SDLP	Connor Duncan	7.32%	3,519	3,527	3,665	3,759	4,992		
Alliance	Patricia O'Lynn	5.44%	2,616	2,655	2,721	3,030			
TUV	Timothy Gaston	3.13%	1,505	1,506	1,509				
Green (NI)	Mark Bailey	1.10%	530	547	580				
Ind. Republican	Monica Digney	0.90%	435	454					
Independent	Adam McBride	0.23%	113						
Electorate: 76,739 Valid: 48,094 (62.67%) Spoilt: 424 Quota: 8,016 Turnout: 48,518 (63.22%)

==== 2016 ====
2016 Assembly election: North Antrim – 6 seats
Party	Candidate	FPv%	Count									
Party	Candidate	FPv%	1	2	3	4	5	6	7	8	9	10
TUV	**Jim Allister**	13.17%	5,399	5,410	5,427	5,458	5,788	5,841	**7,600**			
DUP	**Paul Frew**	13.24%	5,429	5,435	5,449	5,463	5,654	5,717	5,822	**6,095**		
DUP	**Mervyn Storey**	13.13%	5,382	5,395	5,403	5,428	5,481	5,566	5,592	5,710	**8,443**	
DUP	**Phillip Logan**	8.87%	3,635	3,642	3,651	3,672	3,724	3,759	3,834	4,131	4,724	**7,165**
UUP	**Robin Swann**	8.74%	3,585	3,619	3,644	4,306	4,423	4,776	4,841	5,217	5,420	**5,545**
Sinn Féin	**Daithí McKay**	12.92%	5,297	5,302	5,350	5,353	5,374	5,459	5,462	5,466	5,473	**5,474**
SDLP	Connor Duncan	7.54%	3,093	3,146	3,245	3,247	3,276	3,851	3,857	3,864	3,879	3,887
DUP	David McIlveen	7.83%	3,209	3,212	3,213	3,230	3,256	3,273	3,322	3,604		
TUV	Timothy Gaston	4.77%	1,955	1,959	1,965	1,991	2,104	2,123				
Alliance	Stephen McFarland	3.21%	1,318	1,397	1,658	1,671	1,718					
UKIP	Donna Anderson	2.51%	1,027	1,042	1,064	1,070						
UUP	Andrew Wright	2.00%	821	826	831							
Green (NI)	Jennifer Breslin	1.25%	513	593								
NI Labour	Kathryn Johnston	0.59%	243									
NI Conservatives	James Simpson	0.22%	92									
Electorate: 78,337 Valid: 40,998 (52.34%) Spoilt: 466 Quota: 5,857 Turnout: 41,464 (52.93%)

==== 2011 ====
2011 Assembly election: North Antrim – 6 seats
Party	Candidate	FPv%	Count								
Party	Candidate	FPv%	1	2	3	4	5	6	7	8	9
DUP	**Paul Frew**	16.32%	**6,581**								
Sinn Féin	**Daithí McKay**	15.26%	**6,152**								
DUP	**Mervyn Storey**	15.09%	**6,083**								
DUP	**David McIlveen**	8.12%	3,275	3,825.56	3,831.8	3,832.84	3,941.04	3,973.79	4,062.54	**6,593.54**	
UUP	**Robin Swann**	6.25%	2,518	2,547.4	2,565.64	2,566.2	2,828.76	2,839.81	4,577.99	4,991.22	**5,556.6**
TUV	**Jim Allister**	10.07%	4,061	4,092.68	4,655.92	4,656.96	4,744.6	4,759.35	4,963	5,189.42	**5,429.99**
SDLP	Declan O'Loan	9.13%	3,682	3,688.84	3,688.96	4,035.92	4,639.04	4,641.34	4,745.27	4,797.74	4,816.37
DUP	Evelyne Robinson	8.08%	3,256	3,380.68	3,404.52	3,406.28	3,539.4	3,754.45	3,989.68		
UUP	Bill Kennedy	5.43%	2,189	2,206.52	2,236.64	2,240.72	2,563.96	2,583.16			
Alliance	Jayne Dunlop	4.58%	1,848	1,859.76	1,867.88	1,882.52					
TUV	Audrey Patterson	1.66%	668	670.4							
Electorate: 74,760 Valid: 40,313 (53.92%) Spoilt: 670 Quota: 5,760 Turnout: 40,983 (54.82%)

==== 2007 ====
2007 Assembly election: North Antrim – 6 seats
Party	Candidate	FPv%	Count									
Party	Candidate	FPv%	1	2	3	4	5	6	7	8	9	10
DUP	**Ian Paisley**	17.41%	**7,716**									
Sinn Féin	**Daithí McKay**	15.94%	**7,065**									
DUP	**Ian Paisley Jr**	13.77%	6,106	**7,264.04**								
UUP	**Robert Coulter**	11.38%	5,047	5,065.87	5,088.36	5,090.45	5,133.6	5,542.66	**6,578.66**			
DUP	**Mervyn Storey**	11.66%	5,171	5,251.24	5,946.87	5,947.2	6,023.9	6,070.76	6,186.83	**6,923.83**		
SDLP	**Declan O'Loan**	7.40%	3,281	3,282.36	3,282.62	3,583.36	3,755.17	3,955.91	4,001.13	4,060.82	4,071.82	**6,498.23**
DUP	Deirdre Nelson	6.18%	2,740	2,762.95	2,891.78	2,894.42	2,953.2	2,987.04	3,042.71	3,534.8	4,044.8	4,091.99
SDLP	Orla Black	4.80%	2,129	2,130.02	2,130.8	2,411.19	2,536.83	2,764.85	2,803.26	2,838.63	2,844.63	
UK Unionist	Lyle Cubitt	4.17%	1,848	1,858.54	1,874.53	1,874.64	1,971.35	2,052.11	2,148.85			
UUP	Robin Swann	2.89%	1,281	1,289.67	1,298.25	1,298.69	1,311.8	1,466.24				
Alliance	Jayne Dunlop	2.83%	1,254	1,255.19	1,257.40	1,267.74	1,298.25					
Ind. Republican	Paul McGlinchey	0.86%	383	383	383	482.44						
Independent	James Gregg	0.70%	310	313.23	319.21	320.09						
Electorate: 72,814 Valid: 44,331 (60.88%) Spoilt: 324 Quota: 6,334 Turnout: 44,655 (61.33%)

==== 2003 ====
2003 Assembly election: North Antrim – 6 seats
Party	Candidate	FPv%	Count								
Party	Candidate	FPv%	1	2	3	4	5	6	7	8	9
DUP	**Ian Paisley**	19.80%	**8,732**								
DUP	**Ian Paisley Jr**	17.91%	**7,898**								
UUP	**Robert Coulter**	14.48%	**6,385**								
DUP	**Mervyn Storey**	8.17%	3,605	5,787.6	**7,152.2**						
Sinn Féin	**Philip McGuigan**	14.05%	6,195	6,195	6,195.2	6,195.2	6,198.2	6,198.26	6,199.46	6,207.94	**6,496.94**
SDLP	**Sean Farren**	8.27%	3,648	3,649.68	3,652.08	3,654.88	3,666.28	3,666.61	3,689.6	3,920.82	**5,980.43**
UUP	James Currie	7.15%	3,153	3,247.08	3,320.68	3,598.68	3,676.36	3,735.98	4,041.24	4,975.04	5,049.97
SDLP	Declan O'Loan	5.35%	2,361	2,362.68	2,363.68	2,365.08	2,374.36	2,374.48	2,381.69	2,515.36	
UK Unionist	Nathaniel Small	0.91%	402	444	505	779.4	824.96	825.6	997.2		
Alliance	Jayne Dunlop	1.97%	867	873.44	883.64	896.64	914.4	915.2	953.14		
Independent	Gardiner Kane	1.41%	623	677.6	703.2	788.2	819.88	820.74			
PUP	Billy McCaughey	0.52%	230	244.84	254.04	297.64					
Electorate: 70,489 Valid: 44,099 (62.56%) Spoilt: 533 Quota: 6,300 Turnout: 44,632 (63.32%)

==== 1998 ====
1998 Assembly election: North Antrim – 6 seats
Party	Candidate	FPv%	Count											
Party	Candidate	FPv%	1	2	3	4	5	6	7	8	9	10	11	12
DUP	**Ian Paisley**	21.31%	**10,590**											
DUP	**Ian Paisley Jr**	8.97%	4,459	**7,551.1**										
SDLP	**Sean Farren**	12.94%	6,433	6,433.99	6,434.23	6,479.23	6,662.27	**8,300.27**						
UUP	**Robert Coulter**	10.88%	5,407	5,440.99	5,451.27	5,501.82	5,636.24	5,644.24	5,660.39	6,760.58	6,797.98	**7,832.98**		
UUP	**James Leslie**	6.96%	3,458	3,480.11	3,486.95	3,509.55	3,702.17	3,713.50	3,733.05	4,465.62	4,473.87	5,335.74	5,991.09	**7,580.09**
DUP	**Gardiner Kane**	7.32%	3,638	3,776.93	4,053.73	4,107.23	4,242.28	4,247.69	4,249.39	4,285.12	4,290.16	4,327.91	4,344.06	**5,818.1**
Sinn Féin	James McCarry	4.07%	2,024	2,024	2,024.24	2,044.28	2,200.28	2,379.28	2,815.33	2,837.28	4,892.88	5,135.68	5,144.18	5,153.98
Ind. Unionist	William Wright	6.63%	3,297	3,415.8	3,461	3,515.22	3,730.24	3,731.28	3,733.83	3,791.25	3,792.95	3,955.6	4,002.35	
Alliance	Jayne Dunlop	4.59%	2,282	2,285.63	2,287.19	2,331.92	2,456.03	2,523.03	2,870.68	3,031.6	3,146.7			
Sinn Féin	Joe Cahill	4.07%	2,021	2,021	2,021.04	2,025.04	2,079.04	2,157.04	2,488.54	2,496.24				
UUP	Patricia Campbell	4.42%	2,199	2,207.58	2,210.78	2,226.56	2,350.95	2,361.95	2,401.9					
SDLP	Malachy McCamphill	3.99%	1,982	1,982.99	1,983.27	2,002.31	2,075.31							
PUP	Richard Rodgers	1.29%	641	648.59	653.15	666.49								
Ind. Republican	Oliver McMullan	0.96%	478	478.33	478.49	502.49								
Ulster Democratic	Maurice McAllister	0.80%	400	414.85	419.85	422.08								
Independent	Chris McCaughan	0.39%	194	195.32	195.84									
Natural Law	John Wright	0.31%	156	171.51	179.03									
Independent	Thomas Palmer	0.08%	38	39.98	44.06									
Electorate: 73,247 Valid: 49,697 (67.85%) Spoilt: 864 Quota: 7,100 Turnout: 50,561 (69.03%)

=== 1996 forum ===
Successful candidates are shown in bold.

Party	Candidate(s)	Votes	Percentage
DUP	**Ian Paisley**; **Ian Paisley Jr**; Gardiner Kane; Samuel McConaghie; Maurice Mills	16,448	37.0
UUP	**Robert Coulter**; **Joe Gaston**; William Wright; James Leslie; James Simpson	11,195	25.2
SDLP	**Sean Farren**; Dick Kerr; Patrick McAvoy; Malachy McCamphill; Malachy McSparran	7,185	16.1
Sinn Féin	James McCarry; Christine McAuley	2,579	5.8
Alliance	David Alderdice; Gareth Williams	2,518	5.6
UK Unionist	Harry Gordon; Laura Lyle	1,185	2.7
Ulster Democratic	Kenneth Blair; Winston McConnell	768	1.7
Independent McMullan	Oliver McMullan; John Robb	670	1.5
PUP	Mervyn Craig; Alan Elder	665	1.5
NI Women's Coalition	Teresa Godfrey; Irene Leacock; Carol Nevin	272	0.6
NI Conservatives	Elizabeth Armstrong; Mary Noble	259	0.6
Labour coalition	Robert Margrain; Benjamin Adams; Mark McKavanagh; Niall Mulholland	187	0.4
Ulster Independence	Agnes McLeister; Ivan McLaughlan	167	0.5
Green (NI)	Maria McAllister; Graham Gingles; Roger Frew	150	0.4
Democratic Partnership	Christopher McCaughan; Paul Cunningham	114	0.3
Workers' Party	Rosemary McBride; Pat Scullion	60	0.1
Democratic Left	Alan Darnbrook; Colm McGinn	40	0.1
Natural Law	Francis Chalmers; John Wright	14	0.0
Independent Chambers	Ryan Hay; Jean Arbuthnot	13	0.0

=== 1982 Assembly election ===
1982 Assembly election: North Antrim – 8 seats
Party	Candidate	FPv%	Count										
Party	Candidate	FPv%	1	2	3	4	5	6	7	8	9	10	11
DUP	**Ian Paisley**	15.75%	**9,231**										
DUP	**Jim Allister**	9.96%	5,835	**7,113.61**									
UUP	**Joe Gaston**	9.99%	5,856	5,996.36	6,257.05	6,272.78	6,295.62	**7,668.62**					
SDLP	**Sean Farren**	8.54%	5,006	5,007.16	5,050.45	5,050.58	5,141.87	5,145.87	5,145.87	**8,174.87**			
Alliance	**Seán Neeson**	5.56%	3,258	3,273.37	3,384.24	3,385.41	5,279.12	5,310.7	5,331.17	5,505.33	**6,830.33**		
DUP	**Jack McKee**	7.70%	4,515	4,857.49	4,922.29	5,295	5,306.29	5,324.26	5,332.27	5,343.85	5,344.85	**7,871.85**	
UUP	**Roy Beggs**	8.34%	4,885	4,977.8	5,074.86	5,086.95	5,179.66	5,762.69	6,480.03	6,489.03	6,498.03	**6,586.03**	
DUP	**Cecil Cousley**	7.05%	4,133	4,543.64	4,675.59	4,778.42	4,786.42	4,974.41	5,032.26	5,040.26	5,048.26	5,539.78	**6,835.06**
UUP	Charles Brown	6.15%	3,606	3,641.38	3,698.15	3,703.09	3,758.22	4,226.89	4,563.31	4,564.31	4,573.31	4,815.55	4,864.83
DUP	Ken McFaul	5.38%	3,153	3,340.05	3,385.85	3,440.58	3,447.87	3,473.74	3,480.86	3,486.86	3,492.86		
SDLP	Michael O'Cleary	5.67%	3,321	3,323.61	3,356.61	3,356.61	3,373.61	3,373.61	3,373.61				
UUP	David Burnside	4.34%	2,542	2,591.01	2,719.39	2,724.46	2,756.46						
Alliance	Thomas Benson	3.70%	2,170	2,174.93	2,259.93	2,260.84							
UUUP	Robert Glass	0.76%	444	486.34									
Ind. Unionist	Price McConaghy	0.61%	357	380.2									
Ecology	Malcolm Samuel	0.50%	295	297									
Electorate: 104,683 Valid: 58,607 (55.99%) Spoilt: 1,543 Quota: 6,512 Turnout: 60,150 (57.46%)

=== 1975 Constitutional Convention ===
1975 Constitutional Convention: North Antrim – 8 seats
Party	Candidate	FPv%	Count											
Party	Candidate	FPv%	1	2	3	4	5	6	7	8	9	10	11	12
DUP	**Ian Paisley**	31.08%	**19,335**											
DUP	**Ken McFaul**	12.31%	7,658	**11,454.2**										
DUP	**Clifford Smyth**	9.33%	5,806	**10,640.8**										
Alliance	**Hugh Wilson**	7.39%	4,601	4,691.6	4,720.4	4,757.06	5,764.62	5,964.79	6,007.79	6,098.9	**8,243.9**			
SDLP	**John Turnley**	7.86%	4,888	4,901.8	4,909.6	4,913.11	5,030.31	5,032.31	5,967.11	5,985.48	6,012.08	**9,240.08**		
Vanguard	**William Wright**	4.44%	2,761	3,469	5,030.8	6,081.85	6,087.85	6,121.79	6,126.77	6,721.76	6,946.98	6,970.18	7,001.18	**7,096.04**
Vanguard	**David Allen**	3.65%	2,268	3,044.4	4,017.6	4,964.52	4,978.48	5,032.54	5,038.91	5,416.52	5,939.96	5,972.35	6,016.35	**6,113.69**
UUP	Adam Erwin	2.81%	1,751	2,141.6	2,654	3,087.29	3,099.87	3,153.36	3,156.96	4,712.67	5,669.62	5,722.81	5,794.81	6,066.37
SDLP	Denis Haughey	5.42%	3,371	3,375.2	3,378.8	3,379.58	3,434.17	3,439.37	4,781.17	4,786.97	4,817.57			
Unionist Party NI	Iris Agnew	5.04%	3,138	3,256.8	3,309.6	3,370.83	3,398.61	4,459.48	4,464.08	4,593.92				
UUP	William Rainey	2.55%	1,587	2,204.4	2,540.4	2,825.49	2,838.07	2,935.82	2,940.42					
SDLP	James McClements	3.73%	2,318	2,324	2,326.4	2,328.74	2,375.13	2,376.73						
Unionist Party NI	Samuel Murphy	2.29%	1,425	1,497.6	1,528.2	1,553.94	1,580.93							
Alliance	Maurice McHenry	2.11%	1,311	1,338	1,348.2	1,356.78								
Electorate: 103,469 Valid: 62,218 (60.13%) Spoilt: 866 Quota: 7,778 Turnout: 63,084 (60.97%)

=== 1974 by-election to the Northern Ireland Assembly election, 1973 ===
1974 by-election: North Antrim – 1 seat
Party	Candidate	FPv%	Count
Party	Candidate	FPv%	1
DUP	**Clifford Smyth**	61.8	**29,739**
SDLP	John Turnley	21.6	10,421
UUP	Iris Agnew	11.5	5,546
Alliance	Jack Fawcett	5.0	2,430
Electorate: 104,168 Valid: 48,136 Spoilt: 561 Quota: 24,069 Turnout: 48,136 (46.7%)

=== 1973 ===
1973 Assembly election: North Antrim – 7 seats
Party	Candidate	FPv%	Count														
Party	Candidate	FPv%	1	2	3	4	5	6	7	8	9	10	11	12	13	14	15
DUP	**Ian Paisley**	20.43%	**14,553**														
UUP	**John Baxter**	12.64%	**9,009**														
Vanguard	**William Craig**	11.98%	8,538	**10,025.07**													
SDLP	**John O'Hagan**	8.71%	6,204	6,209.07	6,209.65	6,217.65	6,217.71	6,217.71	6,549.81	6,714.4	6,715.42	6,826.59	6,827.59	**11,100.59**			
Alliance	**Hugh Wilson**	4.04%	2,876	2,896.28	2,900.34	2,914.34	2,915.65	2,931.26	3,252.11	4,122.84	4,132.58	6,431.23	6,593.65	6,938.76	**8,666.76**		
UUP	**David McCarthy**	7.19%	5,125	5,269.69	5,322.18	5,330.96	5,384.27	5,401.75	5,450.66	5,462.32	5,553.9	5,617.61	6,930.92	6,936.31	6,946.31	**11,704.31**	
DUP	**James Craig**	5.43%	3,871	5,117.83	5,415.08	5,419.83	5,421.58	5,532.83	5,548.3	5,562.09	6,537.82	6,553.08	6,772.11	6,774.5	6,776.5	7,082.15	**7,829.15**
DUP	Clifford Smyth	3.61%	2,572	4,749.76	5,087.9	5,090.87	5,092.72	5,296.62	5,320.43	5,332.07	6,008.13	6,022.89	6,117.67	6,118.68	6,121.68	6,334.63	6,828.63
UUP	Trevor Strain	5.53%	3,937	4,049.71	4,074.94	4,076.94	4,085.96	4,093.95	4,119.72	4,129.24	4,168.98	4,198.15	5,895.28	5,903.28	5,909.28		
SDLP	John Turnley	6.14%	4,376	4,379.12	4,379.12	4,381.12	4,381.16	4,381.45	4,522.85	4,603.25	4,605.25	4,748.66	4,751.14				
UUP	Samuel Steele	4.62%	3,294	3,358.74	3,377.88	3,381.88	3,394.81	3,427.19	3,459.73	3,473.18	3,533.35	3,589.79					
Alliance	Phelim O'Neill	2.39%	1,701	1,713.87	1,715.03	1,717.03	1,718	1,721.29	2,095.67	2,868.38	2,878.83						
Vanguard	David Burnside	2.11%	1,505	1,634.48	1,840.38	1,850.45	1,855.43	2,029.44	2,039.92	2,045.99							
Alliance	William Kelly	2.35%	1,672	1,685.26	1,688.74	1,720.13	1,720.96	1,732.3	1,997.08								
NI Labour	Patrick McHugh	1.16%	830	840.14	841.88	989.22	989.43	994.22									
Alliance	James Miller	0.91%	651	671.67	676.6	680.6	681.46	682.24									
Vanguard	Thomas Seymour	0.44%	315	478.8	606.11	609.11	609.58										
NI Labour	Robert Binnie	0.34%	240	246.24	247.69												
Electorate: 99,635 Valid: 71,249 (71.51%) Spoilt: 1,040 Quota: 8,907 Turnout: 72,289 (72.55%)
