= 1981 Fermanagh District Council election =

Local government election in Northern Ireland

← 1977	20 May 1981	1985 →

All 20 seats to Fermanagh District Council 11 seats needed for a majority
	First party	Second party	Third party
Party	UUP	Irish Independence	SDLP
Seats won	8	4	4
Seat change	▲2	▲4	▼3
	Fourth party	Fifth party	Sixth party
Party	DUP	Ind. Nationalist	Ind. Republican
Seats won	2	1	1
Seat change	▲2	0	▲1
	Seventh party	Eighth party	Ninth party
Party	UUUP	Unity	Independent
Seats won	0	0	0
Seat change	▼3	▼2	▼1

Elections to Fermanagh District Council, in Northern Ireland, were held on 20 May 1981, the same day as the other Northern Irish local government elections. The election used five district electoral areas to elect a total of 20 councillors.

== Election results ==
Fermanagh District Council Election Result 1981
Party	Seats	Gains	Losses	Net gain/loss	Seats %	Votes %	Votes	+/−
UUP	8	2	0	▲2	40.0	34.0	10,395	▲4.0
Irish Independence	4	4	0	▲4	20.0	22.3	6,867	New
SDLP	4	0	3	▼3	20.0	17.8	5,436	▼7.3
DUP	2	2	0	▲2	10.0	12.3	3,750	▲12.3
Alliance	0	0	0	0	0.0	1.6	477	▼0.3
Ind. Nationalist	1	0	0	0	5.0	5.5	1,697	▲2.9
Ind. Republican	1	1	0	▲1	5.0	3.5	1,069	▲3.5
Independent Labour	0	0	0	0	0.0	1.2	362	▲1.2
Independent	0	0	1	▼1	0.0	1.7	528	▼4.5

Note: "Votes" are the first preference votes.

== Districts summary ==
Results of the Fermanagh District Council election, 1981 by district
Ward	%	Cllrs	%	Cllrs	%	Cllrs	%	Cllrs	%	Cllrs	Total Cllrs
Ward	UUP		IIP		SDLP		DUP		Others		Total Cllrs
Area A	21.3	2	19.6	1	13.8	0	8.3	0	37.0	1	4
Area B	52.0	2	21.5	1	12.4	0	14.1	1	0.0	0	4
Area C	27.6	1	33.7	1	16.5	1	7.9	0	14.3	1	4
Area D	36.8	2	15.8	0	25.9	1	18.6	1	2.9	0	4
Area E	34.3	2	22.5	1	19.9	1	12.6	0	10.7	0	5
Total	34.0	8	22.3	4	17.8	4	12.3	2	13.6	2	20

== Districts results ==
=== Area A ===
1977: 1 x UUP, 1 x SDLP, 1 x Unity, 1 x Independent
1981: 1 x UUP, 1 x SDLP, 1 x IIP, 1 x Independent Republican
1977-1981 Change: IIP gain from Independent, Independent Republican leaves Unity

Fermanagh Area A - 4 seats
Party	Candidate	FPv%	Count					
Party	Candidate	FPv%	1	2	3	4	5	6
UUP	Jack Leahy*	16.29%	1,075	1,076	1,363			
Irish Independence	John McMahon	19.58%	1,292	1,309	1,312	1,312	1,455	
Ind. Republican	John McCusker*	16.20%	1,069	1,085	1,086	1,086.36	1,239.44	1,243.44
SDLP	Fergus McQuillan	9.52%	628	834	838	838.72	1,005.08	1,025.42
Ind. Nationalist	Thomas Murray*	12.87%	849	859	860	860	887	889
DUP	Caroline Madill	8.31%	548	549	576	612.9	616.8	
Independent	Michael McBarron	8.00%	528	544	546	550.32		
UUP	Thomas Johnston	4.99%	329	331				
Electorate: 7,737 Valid: 6,598 (85.28%) Spoilt: 136 Quota: 1,320 Turnout: 6,734 (87.04%)

=== Area B ===
1977: 2 x UUP, 1 x UUUP, 1 x SDLP
1981: 2 x UUP, 1 x IIP, 1 x DUP
1977-1981 Change: IIP and DUP gain from UUUP and SDLP

Fermanagh Area B - 4 seats
Party	Candidate	FPv%	Count					
Party	Candidate	FPv%	1	2	3	4	5	6
UUP	Cecil Noble*	29.30%	1,660					
Irish Independence	Anthony Cox	21.47%	1,216					
UUP	Norman Brown*	15.75%	892	1,181.85				
DUP	Roy Coulter	9.44%	535	583.05	583.14	826.68	828.3	1,136.3
SDLP	Thomas Doherty	6.97%	395	395.93	437.06	437.06	746.36	749.36
UUP	Cyril Crozier	6.99%	396	551	551.99	575.71	580.8	
SDLP	Seamus Carson	5.47%	310	310.93	348.01	350.01		
DUP	Margaret Veitch	4.61%	261	276.5	276.5			
Electorate: 6,582 Valid: 5,665 (86.07%) Spoilt: 109 Quota: 1,134 Turnout: 5,774 (87.72%)

=== Area C ===
1977: 1 x UUP, 1 x SDLP, 1 x Unity, 1 x Independent Nationalist
1981: 1 x UUP, 1 x SDLP, 1 x IIP, 1 x Independent Nationalist
1977-1981 Change: Unity joins IIP

Fermanagh Area C - 4 seats
Party	Candidate	FPv%	Count		
Party	Candidate	FPv%	1	2	3
Irish Independence	Patrick McCaffrey*	19.90%	1,178	1,196	
UUP	Wilson Elliott*	15.90%	941	1,215	
Ind. Nationalist	Patrick Flanagan*	14.32%	848	901	1,252
SDLP	Gerry Gallagher*	13.11%	776	907	1,150
UUP	Herbert Corrigan	11.71%	693	861	890
Irish Independence	Annie Cavanagh	13.78%	816	818	
DUP	George Gott	7.91%	468		
SDLP	Patrick McGovern	3.38%	200		
Electorate: 6,653 Valid: 5,920 (88.98%) Spoilt: 174 Quota: 1,185 Turnout: 6,094 (91.60%)

=== Area D ===
1977: 2 x SDLP, 1 x UUP, 1 x UUUP
1981: 2 x UUP, 1 x SDLP, 1 x DUP
1977-1981 Change: UUP gain from SDLP, UUUP joins DUP

Fermanagh Area D - 5 seats
Party	Candidate	FPv%	Count							
Party	Candidate	FPv%	1	2	3	4	5	6	7	8
UUP	Herbert Kerr	19.31%	1,214	1,290						
SDLP	John O'Kane	13.41%	843	868	868	869.98	990.98	1,003.98	1,505.98	
DUP	Bert Johnston*	14.39%	905	921	1,180	1,181.98	1,183.98	1,187.98	1,194.98	1,197.98
UUP	Caldwell McClaughry	17.08%	1,074	1,117	1,124	1,149.74	1,153.74	1,156.74	1,167.4	1,191.4
Irish Independence	Gerry O'Donnell	8.65%	544	547	548	548	576	876	992	1,170
SDLP	John Cunningham	6.30%	396	414	415	416.98	647.98	752.98		
Irish Independence	Patrick Keown	7.13%	448	450	451	451	460			
SDLP	Patrick McGrath	6.22%	391	403	403	403				
DUP	Mariam Cuthbertson	4.23%	266	270						
Alliance	John Haslett	2.85%	179							
Electorate: 7,320 Valid: 6,287 (85.89%) Spoilt: 84 Quota: 1,258 Turnout: 6,371 (87.04%)

=== Area E ===
1977: 2 x SDLP, 1 x UUP, 1 x UUUP
1981: 2 x UUP, 1 x SDLP, 1 x IIP
1977-1981 Change: UUP and IIP gain from SDLP and UUUP

Fermanagh Area E - 4 seats
Party	Candidate	FPv%	Count							
Party	Candidate	FPv%	1	2	3	4	5	6	7	8
UUP	Raymond Ferguson*	18.26%	1,116	1,124	1,225					
SDLP	James Lunny*	8.49%	519	629	694	790	795	1,294		
Irish Independence	Patrick O'Reilly	13.50%	825	836	844	931	931	984	1,558	
UUP	Samuel Foster	9.21%	563	570	596	603	996	1,001	1,006	1,041
DUP	Nigel Dodds	12.55%	767	768	772	781	813	815	823	837
Irish Independence	Edward Bermingham	8.97%	548	552	553	623	624	639		
SDLP	James Donnelly*	7.46%	456	512	532	608	609			
UUP	Alwin Loane	6.79%	415	421	436	440				
Independent Labour	Thomas Campbell	5.92%	362	384	425					
Alliance	Marjorie Moore	4.88%	298	313						
SDLP	Roy Tarbotton	3.96%	242							
Electorate: 7,934 Valid: 6,111 (77.02%) Spoilt: 142 Quota: 1,223 Turnout: 6,253 (78.81%)
