= Fermanagh Area D =

District electoral areas in Fermanagh, Northern Ireland

Fermanagh Area D was one of the five district electoral areas in Fermanagh, Northern Ireland which existed from 1973 to 1985. The district elected four members to Fermanagh District Council, and formed part of the Fermanagh and South Tyrone constituencies for the Northern Ireland Assembly and UK Parliament.

It was created for the 1973 local elections, and contained the wards of Ballinamallard, Belleek and Boa, Irvinestown and Kesh, Ederny and Lack. It was abolished for the 1985 local elections and replaced with the Erne North DEA.

== Councillors ==
Election	Councillor (Party)	Councillor (Party)	Councillor (Party)	Councillor (Party)
1981	Bert Johnston (DUP)/ (UUUP)	Herbert Kerr (UUP)	Caldwell McClaughry (UUP)	John O'Kane (SDLP)
1977	Bert Johnston (DUP)/ (UUUP)	Hugh Keys (UUP)	Thomas Daly (SDLP)	John Maguire (SDLP)
1973	Francis Gage (UUP)	Ben Loane (UUP)	Thomas Daly (SDLP)	John Maguire (SDLP)

== 1981 Election ==
1977: 2 x SDLP, 1 x UUP, 1 x UUUP

1981: 2 x UUP, 1 x SDLP, 1 x DUP

1977-1981 Change: UUP gain from SDLP, UUUP joins DUP

Fermanagh Area D - 5 seats
Party	Candidate	FPv%	Count							
Party	Candidate	FPv%	1	2	3	4	5	6	7	8
UUP	Herbert Kerr	19.31%	1,214	1,290						
SDLP	John O'Kane	13.41%	843	868	868	869.98	990.98	1,003.98	1,505.98	
DUP	Bert Johnston*	14.39%	905	921	1,180	1,181.98	1,183.98	1,187.98	1,194.98	1,197.98
UUP	Caldwell McClaughry	17.08%	1,074	1,117	1,124	1,149.74	1,153.74	1,156.74	1,167.4	1,191.4
Irish Independence	Gerry O'Donnell	8.65%	544	547	548	548	576	876	992	1,170
SDLP	John Cunningham	6.30%	396	414	415	416.98	647.98	752.98		
Irish Independence	Patrick Keown	7.13%	448	450	451	451	460			
SDLP	Patrick McGrath	6.22%	391	403	403	403				
DUP	Mariam Cuthbertson	4.23%	266	270						
Alliance	John Haslett	2.85%	179							
Electorate: 7,320 Valid: 6,287 (85.89%) Spoilt: 84 Quota: 1,258 Turnout: 6,371 (87.04%)

== 1977 Election ==
1973: 2 x SDLP, 2 x UUP

1977: 2 x SDLP, 1 x UUP, 1 x UUUP

1973-1977 Change: UUUP gain from UUP

Fermanagh Area D - 5 seats
Party	Candidate	FPv%	Count						
Party	Candidate	FPv%	1	2	3	4	5	6	7
UUUP	Bert Johnston	22.36%	1,358						
SDLP	Thomas Daly*	16.89%	1,026	1,026.2	1,042.2	1,057.3	1,117.3	1,395.3	
SDLP	John Maguire*	15.76%	957	957.2	990.2	999.2	1,119.2	1,216.2	
UUP	Hugh Keys	11.79%	716	768	777.3	887.9	893.1	894.1	1,172.4
UUP	Caldwell McClaughry	10.75%	653	683.5	687.7	725.2	727.2	728.3	945.7
UUP	Robert McFarland	6.91%	420	462.6	467.9	518.7	518.7	518.7	
SDLP	James Montague	5.15%	313	313.1	329.1	333.2	382.2		
Unity	James Gallagher	4.91%	298	298.4	304.4	305.4			
Unionist Party NI	Francis Gage*	3.24%	197	201	240.2				
Alliance	Patrick Reihill	2.24%	136	137					
Electorate: 7,292 Valid: 6,074 (83.30%) Spoilt: 130 Quota: 1,215 Turnout: 6,204 (85.08%)

== 1973 Election ==
1973: 2 x SDLP, 2 x UUP

Fermanagh Area D - 5 seats
Party	Candidate	FPv%	Count										
Party	Candidate	FPv%	1	2	3	4	5	6	7	8	9	10	11
UUP	Francis Gage	18.87%	1,143	1,160	1,168	1,194	1,282						
SDLP	John Maguire	13.21%	800	801	802	857	857	857	1,082	1,363			
UUP	Ben Loane	11.51%	697	706	712	724	836	884	885	885	1,411		
SDLP	Thomas Daly	11.13%	674	674	674	690	690	690	756	976	976	978	1,125.32
Independent	David Brien	11.29%	684	697	700	778	850	856	871	882	919	1,095	1,097.32
UUP	Warren Loane	8.50%	515	516	520	534	572	583	583	584			
SDLP	John Monaghan	7.00%	424	430	430	438	438	438	536				
Unity	James Gallagher	6.90%	418	418	418	426	427	428					
DUP	Crowe	4.94%	299	299	383	383							
Alliance	Anthony Ruddy	1.80%	109	137	137								
Alliance	Robert Stewart	1.68%	102	113	113								
DUP	Samuel Robinson	1.75%	106	106									
Alliance	Jack Askwith	1.44%	87										
Electorate: 6,993 Valid: 6,058 (86.63%) Spoilt: 60 Quota: 1,212 Turnout: 6,118 (87.49%)
