= Fermanagh Area B =

District electoral areas in Fermanagh, Northern Ireland

Fermanagh Area B was one of the five district electoral areas in Fermanagh, Northern Ireland which existed from 1973 to 1985. The district elected four members to Fermanagh District Council, and formed part of the Fermanagh and South Tyrone constituencies for the Northern Ireland Assembly and UK Parliament.

It was created for the 1973 local elections, and contained the wards of Brookeborough, Lisbellaw, Maguire's Bridge and Tempo. It was abolished for the 1985 local elections and divided between the Enniskillen and Erne East DEAs.

== Councillors ==
Election	Councillor (Party)	Councillor (Party)	Councillor (Party)	Councillor (Party)
1981	Roy Coulter (DUP)	Cecil Noble (UUP)	Norman Brown (UUP)	Anthony Cox (IIP)
1977	Hugh Buchanan (UUUP)	Cecil Noble (UUP)	Norman Brown (UUP)	Damien Campbell (SDLP)
1973	James Nethercott (UUP)	Cecil Noble (UUP)	Norman Brown (UUP)	James Breen (Unity)

== 1981 Election ==
1977: 2 x UUP, 1 x UUUP, 1 x SDLP

1981: 2 x UUP, 1 x IIP, 1 x DUP

1977-1981 Change: IIP and DUP gain from UUUP and SDLP

Fermanagh Area B - 4 seats
Party	Candidate	FPv%	Count					
Party	Candidate	FPv%	1	2	3	4	5	6
UUP	Cecil Noble*	29.30%	1,660					
Irish Independence	Anthony Cox	21.47%	1,216					
UUP	Norman Brown*	15.75%	892	1,181.85				
DUP	Roy Coulter	9.44%	535	583.05	583.14	826.68	828.3	1,136.3
SDLP	Thomas Doherty	6.97%	395	395.93	437.06	437.06	746.36	749.36
UUP	Cyril Crozier	6.99%	396	551	551.99	575.71	580.8	
SDLP	Seamus Carson	5.47%	310	310.93	348.01	350.01		
DUP	Margaret Veitch	4.61%	261	276.5	276.5			
Electorate: 6,582 Valid: 5,665 (86.07%) Spoilt: 109 Quota: 1,134 Turnout: 5,774 (87.72%)

== 1977 Election ==
1973: 3 x UUP, 1 x Unity

1977: 2 x UUP, 1 x UUUP, 1 x SDLP

1973-1977 Change: UUUP and SDLP gain from UUP and Unity

Fermanagh Area B - 4 seats
Party	Candidate	FPv%	Count						
Party	Candidate	FPv%	1	2	3	4	5	6	7
UUP	Cecil Noble*	22.09%	1,202						
UUUP	Hugh Buchanan	19.86%	1,081	1,100.35					
UUP	Norman Brown*	11.65%	634	678.01	735.73	737.73	737.82	737.82	1,270.82
SDLP	Damien Campbell	14.19%	772	772.27	790.36	933.36	985.36	1,034.36	1,036.99
Unity	Patrick Martin	6.63%	361	361	362	393	467	804	808
UUP	Cyril Crozier	10.16%	553	594.58	618.76	619.76	621.85	622.94	
Unity	Vera Cleary	5.07%	276	276.09	277.18	280.18	407.18		
Unity	Patrick McKenna	4.65%	253	253.18	255.18	263.18			
SDLP	Margaret Traynor	3.51%	191	191	196				
Alliance	James Henderson	2.19%	119	120.35					
Electorate: 6,755 Valid: 5,442 (80.56%) Spoilt: 179 Quota: 1,089 Turnout: 5,621 (83.21%)

== 1973 Election ==
1973: 3 x UUP, 1 x Unity

Fermanagh Area B - 4 seats
Party	Candidate	FPv%	Count			
Party	Candidate	FPv%	1	2	3	4
Unity	James Breen	27.49%	1,584			
UUP	Cecil Noble	25.13%	1,448			
UUP	Norman Brown	18.48%	1,065	1,068.51	1,167.51	
UUP	James Nethercott	12.83%	739	741.43	910.23	1,251.23
Unity	Margaret Traynor	5.73%	330	727.71	727.91	838.67
DUP	Irene Hughes	5.38%	310	311.35	327.75	
Alliance	James Henderson	4.96%	286	302.2	306.8	
Electorate: 6,666 Valid: 5,762 (86.44%) Spoilt: 88 Quota: 1,153 Turnout: 5,850 (87.76%)
