= Fermanagh Area C =

District electoral areas in Fermanagh, Northern Ireland

Fermanagh Area C was one of the five district electoral areas in Fermanagh, Northern Ireland which existed from 1973 to 1985. The district elected four members to Fermanagh District Council, and formed part of the Fermanagh and South Tyrone constituencies for the Northern Ireland Assembly and UK Parliament.

It was created for the 1973 local elections, and contained the wards of Belcoo and Belmore, Derrygonnelly, Florencecourt and Kinawley and Garrison. It was abolished for the 1985 local elections and replaced with the Erne West DEA.

== Councillors ==
Election	Councillor (Party)	Councillor (Party)	Councillor (Party)	Councillor (Party)
1981	Wilson Elliott (UUP)	Gerry Gallagher (SDLP)	Patrick McCaffrey (IIP)/ (Unity)	Patrick Flanagan (Independent Nationalist)
1977	Wilson Elliott (UUP)	Gerry Gallagher (SDLP)	Patrick McCaffrey (IIP)/ (Unity)	Patrick Flanagan (Independent Nationalist)
1973	Wilson Elliott (UUP)	Richard Thornton (UUP)	Francis Stewart (Unity)	Patrick Flanagan (Independent Nationalist)

== 1981 Election ==
1977: 1 x UUP, 1 x SDLP, 1 x Unity, 1 x Independent Nationalist

1981: 1 x UUP, 1 x SDLP, 1 x IIP, 1 x Independent Nationalist

1977-1981 Change: Unity joins IIP

Fermanagh Area C - 4 seats
Party	Candidate	FPv%	Count		
Party	Candidate	FPv%	1	2	3
Irish Independence	Patrick McCaffrey*	19.90%	1,178	1,196	
UUP	Wilson Elliott*	15.90%	941	1,215	
Ind. Nationalist	Patrick Flanagan*	14.32%	848	901	1,252
SDLP	Gerry Gallagher*	13.11%	776	907	1,150
UUP	Herbert Corrigan	11.71%	693	861	890
Irish Independence	Annie Cavanagh	13.78%	816	818	
DUP	George Gott	7.91%	468		
SDLP	Patrick McGovern	3.38%	200		
Electorate: 6,653 Valid: 5,920 (88.98%) Spoilt: 174 Quota: 1,185 Turnout: 6,094 (91.60%)

== 1977 Election ==
1973: 2 x UUP, 1 x Unity, 1 x Independent Nationalist

1977: 1 x UUP, 1 x Unity, 1 x SDLP, 1 x Independent Nationalist

1973-1977 Change: SDLP gain from UUP

Fermanagh Area C - 4 seats
Party	Candidate	FPv%	Count						
Party	Candidate	FPv%	1	2	3	4	5	6	7
UUP	Wilson Elliott*	12.70%	763	763	763	764	1,203		
Unity	Patrick McCaffrey	17.54%	1,054	1,071	1,089	1,131	1,132	1,625	
SDLP	Gerry Gallagher	11.87%	713	837	912	991	994	1,076	1,202
Ind. Nationalist	Patrick Flanagan*	12.48%	750	818	852	953	968	1,027	1,142
UUUP	Cyril Brownlee	14.56%	875	875	876	877	953	955	957
Unity	Cornelius Leonard	6.01%	361	368	530	691	693		
UUP	Richard Thornton*	9.32%	560	561	561	572			
Independent	James Mellor	6.66%	400	410	415				
Unity	Patrick Keown	4.96%	298	300					
SDLP	Patrick McGovern	3.89%	234						
Electorate: 6,756 Valid: 6,008 (88.93%) Spoilt: 154 Quota: 1,202 Turnout: 6,162 (91.21%)

=== Area C ===
1973: 2 x UUP, 1 x Unity, 1 x Independent Nationalist

Fermanagh Area C - 4 seats
Party	Candidate	FPv%	Count					
Party	Candidate	FPv%	1	2	3	4	5	6
UUP	Wilson Elliott	26.20%	1,581					
Ind. Nationalist	Patrick Flanagan	15.54%	938	939.38	939.38	1,297.38		
Unity	Francis Stewart	13.19%	796	796.69	802.15	848.38	917.88	1,201.86
UUP	Richard Thornton	7.46%	450	732.9	962.74	962.97	962.97	1,050.56
Unity	Patrick McCaffrey	13.70%	827	827.92	828.92	840.92	851.17	1,037.84
Alliance	Brian Finn	10.97%	662	673.96	690.87	781.1	789.85	
Unity	Patrick O'Flanagan	8.47%	511	511.69	512.69			
DUP	Kenneth Scott	4.47%	270	330.72				
Electorate: 6,855 Valid: 6,035 (88.04%) Spoilt: 84 Quota: 1,208 Turnout: 6,119 (89.26%)
