= Fermanagh Area E =

District electoral areas in Fermanagh, Northern Ireland

Fermanagh Area E was one of the five district electoral areas in Fermanagh, Northern Ireland which existed from 1973 to 1985. The district elected four members to Fermanagh District Council, and formed part of the Fermanagh and South Tyrone constituencies for the Northern Ireland Assembly and UK Parliament.

It was created for the 1973 local elections, and contained the wards of Castlecoole, Devenish, Erne and Rossorry. It was abolished for the 1985 local elections and replaced with the Enniskillen DEA.

== Councillors ==
Election	Councillor (Party)	Councillor (Party)	Councillor (Party)	Councillor (Party)
1981	Raymond Ferguson (UUP)	Samuel Foster (UUP)	James Lunny (SDLP)	Patrick O'Reilly (IIP)
1977	Raymond Ferguson (UUP)	Thomas Scott (UUUP)/ (UUP)	James Lunny (SDLP)	James Donnelly (SDLP)
1973	George Cathcart (Independent Unionist)	Thomas Scott (UUUP)/ (UUP)	James Lunny (SDLP)	Mary Corrigan (SDLP)

== 1981 Election ==
1977: 2 x SDLP, 1 x UUP, 1 x UUUP

1981: 2 x UUP, 1 x SDLP, 1 x IIP

1977-1981 Change: UUP and IIP gain from SDLP and UUUP

Fermanagh Area E - 4 seats
Party	Candidate	FPv%	Count							
Party	Candidate	FPv%	1	2	3	4	5	6	7	8
UUP	Raymond Ferguson*	18.26%	1,116	1,124	1,225					
SDLP	James Lunny*	8.49%	519	629	694	790	795	1,294		
Irish Independence	Patrick O'Reilly	13.50%	825	836	844	931	931	984	1,558	
UUP	Samuel Foster	9.21%	563	570	596	603	996	1,001	1,006	1,041
DUP	Nigel Dodds	12.55%	767	768	772	781	813	815	823	837
Irish Independence	Edward Bermingham	8.97%	548	552	553	623	624	639		
SDLP	James Donnelly*	7.46%	456	512	532	608	609			
UUP	Alwin Loane	6.79%	415	421	436	440				
Independent Labour	Thomas Campbell	5.92%	362	384	425					
Alliance	Marjorie Moore	4.88%	298	313						
SDLP	Roy Tarbotton	3.96%	242							
Electorate: 7,934 Valid: 6,111 (77.02%) Spoilt: 142 Quota: 1,223 Turnout: 6,253 (78.81%)

== 1977 Election ==
1973: 2 x SDLP, 1 x UUP, 1 x Independent Unionist

1977: 2 x SDLP, 1 x UUP, 1 x UUUP

1973-1977 Change: UUUP gain from Independent Unionist

Fermanagh Area E - 4 seats
Party	Candidate	FPv%	Count								
Party	Candidate	FPv%	1	2	3	4	5	6	7	8	9
SDLP	James Lunny*	12.96%	707	768	825	866	1,128				
UUP	Raymond Ferguson	14.19%	774	774	810	993	1,001	1,001.48	1,614.48		
UUUP	Thomas Scott*	16.77%	915	917	922	945	947	947.16	1,020.16	1,485.16	
SDLP	James Donnelly	10.23%	558	581	601	611	789	819.56	825.56	833.56	859.56
Unity	James Cox	12.06%	658	698	703	717	760	763.52	770.68	778.68	788.68
UUP	Robert Donaldson	10.70%	584	594	604	727	730	730.48			
SDLP	Matthew Kelly	7.77%	424	480	511	520					
Unionist Party NI	George Cathcart*	6.05%	330	332	447						
Alliance	Marjorie Moore	5.35%	292	302							
Independent	Thaddeus McKeown	3.92%	214								
Electorate: 7,530 Valid: 5,456 (72.46%) Spoilt: 171 Quota: 1,092 Turnout: 5,627 (74.73%)

== 1973 Election ==
1973: 2 x SDLP, 1 x UUP, 1 x Independent Unionist

Fermanagh Area E - 4 seats
Party	Candidate	FPv%	Count									
Party	Candidate	FPv%	1	2	3	4	5	6	7	8	9	10
Ind. Unionist	George Cathcart	25.74%	1,496									
UUP	Thomas Scott	13.32%	774	1,007.42	1,007.42	1,008.96	1,009.18	1,012.06	1,012.06	1,429.06		
SDLP	James Lunny	12.04%	700	700	715	723	738	778.44	1,007.32	1,020.98	1,024.98	1,263.98
SDLP	Mary Corrigan	9.64%	560	561.54	568.54	572.54	578.54	590.54	706.54	712.76	713.76	939.76
Alliance	Marjorie Moore	4.70%	273	290.6	307.6	405.98	407.98	599.26	611.26	659.74	721.74	745.4
Unity	John McManus	6.62%	385	385.22	426.22	427.44	638.44	645.66	678.66	688.66	689.66	
DUP	Robert Donaldson	8.77%	510	560.82	561.82	576.02	578.02	582.78	586.78			
SDLP	James Donnelly	6.57%	382	382.88	388.88	392.88	397.88	408.88				
Alliance	James Falconer	3.66%	213	219.82	231.82	281.46	281.46					
Unity	Anthony Maguire	3.65%	212	212	245.22	247.22						
Alliance	Herfort Ritchie	2.89%	168	181.86	187.86							
Unity	Joseph Owens	1.34%	78	78								
Alliance	Edward Love	1.05%	61	61.44								
Electorate: 7,232 Valid: 5,812 (80.37%) Spoilt: 75 Quota: 1,163 Turnout: 5,887 (81.40%)
