= 1977 Fermanagh District Council election =

Local government election in Northern Ireland

← 1973	18 May 1977	1981 →

All 20 seats to Fermanagh District Council 11 seats needed for a majority
	First party	Second party	Third party
Party	SDLP	UUP	UUUP
Seats won	7	6	3
Seat change	▲3	▼2	▲3
	Fourth party	Fifth party	Sixth party
Party	Unity	Independent	Ind. Nationalist
Seats won	2	1	1
Seat change	▼2	▲1	▼1
	Seventh party
Party	Ind. Unionist
Seats won	0
Seat change	▼2

Elections to Fermanagh District Council were held on 18 May 1977 on the same day as the other Northern Irish local government elections. The election used five district electoral areas to elect a total of 20 councillors.

== Election results ==
Fermanagh District Council Election Result 1977
Party	Seats	Gains	Losses	Net gain/loss	Seats %	Votes %	Votes	+/−
SDLP	7	3	0	▲3	35.0	25.1	7,392	▲13.2
UUP	6	1	3	▼2	30.0	30.0	8,804	▲1.8
UUUP	3	3	0	▲3	15.0	14.4	4,229	New
Unity	2	0	2	▼2	10.0	18.1	5,325	▼6.2
Independent	1	1	0	▲1	5.0	6.2	1,819	▲1.2
Ind. Nationalist	1	0	1	▼1	5.0	2.6	750	▼3.8
Alliance	0	0	0	0	0.0	1.9	547	▼5.8
Unionist Party NI	0	0	0	0	0.0	1.8	527	New

Note: "Votes" are the first preference votes.

== Districts summary ==
Results of the Fermanagh District Council election, 1977 by district
Ward	%	Cllrs	%	Cllrs	%	Cllrs	%	Cllrs	%	Cllrs	Total Cllrs
Ward	SDLP		UUP		UUUP		Unity		Others		Total Cllrs
Area A	23.3	1	30.3	1	0.0	0	27.5	1	18.9	1	4
Area B	17.7	1	43.9	2	19.9	1	16.4	0	2.1	0	4
Area C	15.8	1	22.0	1	14.6	0	28.5	1	19.1	1	4
Area D	37.8	2	29.5	1	22.4	1	4.9	0	5.4	0	4
Area E	31.0	2	24.9	1	16.8	1	12.1	0	15.2	0	5
Total	25.1	7	30.0	6	14.4	3	18.1	2	12.4	2	20

== Districts results ==
=== Area A ===
1973: 2 x Unity, 1 x Independent Unionist, 1 x Independent Nationalist
1977: 1 x Unity, 1 x UUP, 1 x SDLP, 1 x Independent
1973-1977 Change: Independent gain from Unity, Independent Unionist joins UUP and Independent Nationalist joins SDLP

Fermanagh Area A - 4 seats
Party	Candidate	FPv%	Count		
Party	Candidate	FPv%	1	2	3
UUP	Jack Leahy*	20.69%	1,327		
SDLP	Thomas Murray*	15.72%	1,008	1,361	
Independent	James McBarron	18.79%	1,205	1,212	1,257
Unity	John McCusker*	14.95%	959	1,044	1,054
Unity	John McMahon*	12.58%	807	843	847
UUP	Thomas Johnston	9.64%	618	620	
SDLP	Ann McQuillan	7.63%	489		
Electorate: 7,708 Valid: 6,413 (83.20%) Spoilt: 189 Quota: 1,283 Turnout: 6,602 (85.65%)

=== Area B ===
1973: 3 x UUP, 1 x Unity
1977: 2 x UUP, 1 x UUUP, 1 x SDLP
1973-1977 Change: UUUP and SDLP gain from UUP and Unity

Fermanagh Area B - 4 seats
Party	Candidate	FPv%	Count						
Party	Candidate	FPv%	1	2	3	4	5	6	7
UUP	Cecil Noble*	22.09%	1,202						
UUUP	Hugh Buchanan	19.86%	1,081	1,100.35					
UUP	Norman Brown*	11.65%	634	678.01	735.73	737.73	737.82	737.82	1,270.82
SDLP	Damien Campbell	14.19%	772	772.27	790.36	933.36	985.36	1,034.36	1,036.99
Unity	Patrick Martin	6.63%	361	361	362	393	467	804	808
UUP	Cyril Crozier	10.16%	553	594.58	618.76	619.76	621.85	622.94	
Unity	Vera Cleary	5.07%	276	276.09	277.18	280.18	407.18		
Unity	Patrick McKenna	4.65%	253	253.18	255.18	263.18			
SDLP	Margaret Traynor	3.51%	191	191	196				
Alliance	James Henderson	2.19%	119	120.35					
Electorate: 6,755 Valid: 5,442 (80.56%) Spoilt: 179 Quota: 1,089 Turnout: 5,621 (83.21%)

=== Area C ===
1973: 2 x UUP, 1 x Unity, 1 x Independent Nationalist
1977: 1 x UUP, 1 x Unity, 1 x SDLP, 1 x Independent Nationalist
1973-1977 Change: SDLP gain from UUP

Fermanagh Area C - 4 seats
Party	Candidate	FPv%	Count						
Party	Candidate	FPv%	1	2	3	4	5	6	7
UUP	Wilson Elliott*	12.70%	763	763	763	764	1,203		
Unity	Patrick McCaffrey	17.54%	1,054	1,071	1,089	1,131	1,132	1,625	
SDLP	Gerry Gallagher	11.87%	713	837	912	991	994	1,076	1,202
Ind. Nationalist	Patrick Flanagan*	12.48%	750	818	852	953	968	1,027	1,142
UUUP	Cyril Brownlee	14.56%	875	875	876	877	953	955	957
Unity	Cornelius Leonard	6.01%	361	368	530	691	693		
UUP	Richard Thornton*	9.32%	560	561	561	572			
Independent	James Mellor	6.66%	400	410	415				
Unity	Patrick Keown	4.96%	298	300					
SDLP	Patrick McGovern	3.89%	234						
Electorate: 6,756 Valid: 6,008 (88.93%) Spoilt: 154 Quota: 1,202 Turnout: 6,162 (91.21%)

=== Area D ===
1973: 2 x SDLP, 2 x UUP
1977: 2 x SDLP, 1 x UUP, 1 x UUUP
1973-1977 Change: UUUP gain from UUP

Fermanagh Area D - 5 seats
Party	Candidate	FPv%	Count						
Party	Candidate	FPv%	1	2	3	4	5	6	7
UUUP	Bert Johnston	22.36%	1,358						
SDLP	Thomas Daly*	16.89%	1,026	1,026.2	1,042.2	1,057.3	1,117.3	1,395.3	
SDLP	John Maguire*	15.76%	957	957.2	990.2	999.2	1,119.2	1,216.2	
UUP	Hugh Keys	11.79%	716	768	777.3	887.9	893.1	894.1	1,172.4
UUP	Caldwell McClaughry	10.75%	653	683.5	687.7	725.2	727.2	728.3	945.7
UUP	Robert McFarland	6.91%	420	462.6	467.9	518.7	518.7	518.7	
SDLP	James Montague	5.15%	313	313.1	329.1	333.2	382.2		
Unity	James Gallagher	4.91%	298	298.4	304.4	305.4			
Unionist Party NI	Francis Gage*	3.24%	197	201	240.2				
Alliance	Patrick Reihill	2.24%	136	137					
Electorate: 7,292 Valid: 6,074 (83.30%) Spoilt: 130 Quota: 1,215 Turnout: 6,204 (85.08%)

=== Area E ===
1973: 2 x SDLP, 1 x UUP, 1 x Independent Unionist
1977: 2 x SDLP, 1 x UUP, 1 x UUUP
1973-1977 Change: UUUP gain from Independent Unionist

Fermanagh Area E - 4 seats
Party	Candidate	FPv%	Count								
Party	Candidate	FPv%	1	2	3	4	5	6	7	8	9
SDLP	James Lunny*	12.96%	707	768	825	866	1,128				
UUP	Raymond Ferguson	14.19%	774	774	810	993	1,001	1,001.48	1,614.48		
UUUP	Thomas Scott*	16.77%	915	917	922	945	947	947.16	1,020.16	1,485.16	
SDLP	James Donnelly	10.23%	558	581	601	611	789	819.56	825.56	833.56	859.56
Unity	James Cox	12.06%	658	698	703	717	760	763.52	770.68	778.68	788.68
UUP	Robert Donaldson	10.70%	584	594	604	727	730	730.48			
SDLP	Matthew Kelly	7.77%	424	480	511	520					
Unionist Party NI	George Cathcart*	6.05%	330	332	447						
Alliance	Marjorie Moore	5.35%	292	302							
Independent	Thaddeus McKeown	3.92%	214								
Electorate: 7,530 Valid: 5,456 (72.46%) Spoilt: 171 Quota: 1,092 Turnout: 5,627 (74.73%)
