= 1989 Fermanagh District Council election =

Local government election in Northern Ireland

← 1985	17 May 1989	1993 →

All 23 seats to Fermanagh District Council 12 seats needed for a majority
	First party	Second party	Third party
Party	UUP	SDLP	Sinn Féin
Seats won	10	5	4
Seat change	▲2	▲1	▼4
	Fourth party	Fifth party	Sixth party
Party	DUP	Workers' Party	Ind. Nationalist
Seats won	2	1	1
Seat change	0	▲1	▲1
	Seventh party
Party	Irish Independence
Seats won	0
Seat change	▼1

Elections to Fermanagh District Council were held on 17 May 1989 on the same day as the other Northern Irish local government elections. The election used four district electoral areas to elect a total of 23 councillors.

== Election results ==
Fermanagh District Council Election Result 1989
Party	Seats	Gains	Losses	Net gain/loss	Seats %	Votes %	Votes	+/−
UUP	10	2	0	▲2	43.5	39.9	12,043	▲6.9
SDLP	5	1	0	▲2	21.7	18.7	5,646	▲1.9
Sinn Féin	4	0	4	▼4	17.4	20.4	6,170	▼4.8
DUP	2	0	0	0	8.7	8.6	2,582	▼4.4
Ind. Nationalist	1	1	0	▲1	4.3	5.3	1,604	▲3.8
Workers' Party	1	1	0	▲1	0.0	3.8	1,150	▲2.5
Ind. Republican	0	0	0	0	0.0	1.6	473	▲1.6
Alliance	0	0	0	0	0.0	1.0	305	▼0.8
Independent Socialist	0	0	0	0	0.0	0.6	170	▲0.6
Independent	0	0	0	0	0.0	0.1	25	▼0.1

Note: "Votes" are the first preference votes.

== Districts summary ==
Results of the Fermanagh District Council election, 1989 by district
Ward	%	Cllrs	%	Cllrs	%	Cllrs	%	Cllrs	%	Cllrs	%	Cllrs	Total Cllrs
Ward	UUP		SDLP		Sinn Féin		DUP		Workers' Party		Others		Total Cllrs
Enniskillen	45.6	3	13.5	1	14.2	1	10.5	1	12.6	1	3.6	1	7
Erne East	37.3	3	19.3	1	30.5	2	4.9	0	0.0	0	8.0	0	6
Erne North	42.1	2	27.7	2	10.4	0	19.8	1	0.0	0	0.0	0	5
Erne West	33.4	2	16.8	1	26.2	1	0.0	0	0.0	0	23.6	1	5
Total	39.9	10	18.7	5	20.4	4	8.6	2	3.8	1	8.6	1	23

== District results ==
=== Enniskillen ===
1985: 3 x UUP, 2 x Sinn Féin, 1 x SDLP, 1 x DUP
1989: 3 x UUP, 1 x Sinn Féin, 1 x SDLP, 1 x DUP, 1 x Workers' Party
1985-1989 Change: Workers' Party gain from Sinn Féin

Enniskillen - 7 seats
Party	Candidate	FPv%	Count									
Party	Candidate	FPv%	1	2	3	4	5	6	7	8	9	10
UUP	Raymond Ferguson*	17.97%	1,639									
UUP	Samuel Foster*	16.28%	1,485									
Workers' Party	Davy Kettyles	12.61%	1,150									
UUP	William Hetherington*	8.60%	784	1,058.04	1,202.25							
SDLP	James Lunny*	7.40%	675	679.34	681.64	686.64	686.87	787.27	787.47	1,268.47		
Sinn Féin	Pat Cox*	7.19%	656	656.31	656.31	658.31	660.31	663.31	663.31	685.31	762.73	1,361.73
DUP	Roy Coulter*	8.81%	803	830.9	868.16	869.16	1,011.01	1,024.56	1,030.06	1,031.68	1,035.6	1,039.56
UUP	Bertie Kerr	2.72%	248	410.13	546.98	547.98	569.21	668.34	722.84	730.07	749.67	755.57
Sinn Féin	John McManus	7.01%	639	639	639	645	645	646.31	646.31	655.31	682.75	
SDLP	James Donnelly	6.09%	555	556.24	556.47	559.47	559.47	596.78	596.78			
Alliance	William Barbour	3.34%	305	322.36	326.04	327.04	329.12					
DUP	John Connor	1.70%	155	161.82	174.01	176.01						
Independent	John Bothwell	0.27%	25	25.62	25.62							
Electorate: 12,402 Valid: 9,119 (73.53%) Spoilt: 222 Quota: 1,140 Turnout: 9,341 (75.32%)

=== Erne East ===
1985: 3 x Sinn Féin, 2 x UUP, 1 x SDLP
1989: 3 x UUP, 2 x Sinn Féin, 1 x SDLP
1985-1989 Change: UUP gain from Sinn Féin

Erne East - 6 seats
Party	Candidate	FPv%	Count								
Party	Candidate	FPv%	1	2	3	4	5	6	7	8	9
SDLP	Fergus McQuillan*	19.28%	1,547								
UUP	Cecil Noble*	15.81%	1,268								
UUP	Albert Liddle*	13.20%	1,059	1,061.38	1,135.36	1,159.36					
Sinn Féin	Brian McCaffrey	9.29%	745	776.28	776.28	776.28	783	783	920.5	1,423.5	
Sinn Féin	Plunket O'Neill*	7.62%	611	625.62	625.62	625.62	646.7	647.79	846.99	987.59	1,249.79
UUP	Jean McVitty	8.31%	667	672.78	702.03	716.81	723.67	1,034.24	1,038.33	1,040.33	1,040.33
Ind. Republican	John McCusker	5.90%	473	669.52	669.52	669.52	786.28	786.28	859.2	901.62	914.82
Sinn Féin	Vincent McCaffrey*	8.21%	659	685.52	685.52	685.52	695.54	695.54	739.32		
Sinn Féin	Ciaran Leonard	5.37%	431	473.16	473.34	474.34	484.72	485.72			
DUP	Paul Robinson	3.29%	264	264	271.11	357.74	358.74				
Independent Socialist	Seamus Mullan	2.12%	170	244.12	244.3	245.64					
DUP	Caroline Madill	1.60%	128	128.68	130.93						
Electorate: 9,489 Valid: 8,022 (84.54%) Spoilt: 155 Quota: 1,147 Turnout: 8,177 (86.17%)

=== Erne North ===
1985: 2 x UUP, 1 x SDLP, 1 x DUP, 1 x Sinn Féin
1989: 2 x UUP, 2 x SDLP, 1 x DUP
1985-1989 Change: SDLP gain from Sinn Féin

Erne North - 5 seats
Party	Candidate	FPv%	Count				
Party	Candidate	FPv%	1	2	3	4	5
UUP	Caldwell McClaughry*	24.34%	1,516				
DUP	Bert Johnston*	17.88%	1,114				
UUP	Simon Loane*	13.04%	812	1,170.36			
SDLP	John O'Kane*	14.95%	931	932.86	934.79	1,042.32	
SDLP	Tommy Gallagher	12.74%	793	793.62	795.55	839.3	954.62
Sinn Féin	Brian McSorley	10.40%	648	648.93	648.93	649.55	651.1
UUP	Gladys Nixon	4.77%	297	359.93	473.97		
DUP	Victor Milligan	1.89%	118	156.75			
Electorate: 7,782 Valid: 6,229 (80.04%) Spoilt: 110 Quota: 1,039 Turnout: 6,339 (81.46%)

=== Erne West ===
1985: 2 x Sinn Féin, 1 x UUP, 1 x SDLP, 1 x IIP
1989: 2 x UUP, 1 x Sinn Féin, 1 x SDLP, 1 x Independent Nationalist
1985-1989 Change: UUP gain from Sinn Féin, Independent Nationalist leaves IIP

Erne West - 5 seats
Party	Candidate	FPv%	Count			
Party	Candidate	FPv%	1	2	3	4
Ind. Nationalist	Patrick McCaffrey*	23.60%	1,604			
UUP	Wilson Elliott*	20.55%	1,397			
Sinn Féin	Paul Corrigan*	17.45%	1,186			
SDLP	Gerry Gallagher*	13.08%	889	1,055.6	1,265.6	
UUP	Derrick Nixon	12.81%	871	875.08	880.46	1,138.86
Sinn Féin	Vincent Martin	8.75%	595	754.12	815.46	816.98
SDLP	Patrick McGovern	3.77%	256	390.98		
Electorate: 8,034 Valid: 6,798 (84.62%) Spoilt: 203 Quota: 1,134 Turnout: 7,001 (87.14%)
