= Fermanagh Area A =

District electoral areas in Fermanagh, Northern Ireland

Fermanagh Area A was one of the five district electoral areas in Fermanagh, Northern Ireland which existed from 1973 to 1985. The district elected four members to Fermanagh District Council, and formed part of the Fermanagh and South Tyrone constituencies for the Northern Ireland Assembly and UK Parliament.

It was created for the 1973 local elections, and contained the wards of Derrylin, Lisnaskea, Newtownbutler and Rosslea. It was abolished for the 1985 local elections and divided between the Enniskillen, Erne East and Erne West DEAs.

== Councillors ==
Election	Councillor (Party)	Councillor (Party)	Councillor (Party)	Councillor (Party)
1981	Jack Leahy (UUP)/ (Independent Unionist)	Fergus McQuillan (SDLP)	John McMahon (IIP)	John McCusker (Independent Republican)/ (Unity)
1977	Jack Leahy (UUP)/ (Independent Unionist)	Thomas Murray (SDLP)/ (Independent Nationalist)	James McBarron (Independent)	John McCusker (Independent Republican)/ (Unity)
1973	Jack Leahy (UUP)/ (Independent Unionist)	Thomas Murray (SDLP)/ (Independent Nationalist)	John McMahon (Unity)	John McCusker (Independent Republican)/ (Unity)

== 1981 Election ==
1977: 1 x UUP, 1 x SDLP, 1 x Unity, 1 x Independent

1981: 1 x UUP, 1 x SDLP, 1 x IIP, 1 x Independent Republican

1977-1981 Change: IIP gain from Independent, Independent Republican leaves Unity

Fermanagh Area A - 4 seats
Party	Candidate	FPv%	Count					
Party	Candidate	FPv%	1	2	3	4	5	6
UUP	Jack Leahy*	16.29%	1,075	1,076	1,363			
Irish Independence	John McMahon	19.58%	1,292	1,309	1,312	1,312	1,455	
Ind. Republican	John McCusker*	16.20%	1,069	1,085	1,086	1,086.36	1,239.44	1,243.44
SDLP	Fergus McQuillan	9.52%	628	834	838	838.72	1,005.08	1,025.42
Ind. Nationalist	Thomas Murray*	12.87%	849	859	860	860	887	889
DUP	Caroline Madill	8.31%	548	549	576	612.9	616.8	
Independent	Michael McBarron	8.00%	528	544	546	550.32		
UUP	Thomas Johnston	4.99%	329	331				
Electorate: 7,737 Valid: 6,598 (85.28%) Spoilt: 136 Quota: 1,320 Turnout: 6,734 (87.04%)

== 1977 Election ==
1973: 2 x Unity, 1 x Independent Unionist, 1 x Independent Nationalist

1977: 1 x Unity, 1 x UUP, 1 x SDLP, 1 x Independent

1973-1977 Change: Independent gain from Unity, Independent Unionist joins UUP and Independent Nationalist joins SDLP

Fermanagh Area A - 4 seats
Party	Candidate	FPv%	Count		
Party	Candidate	FPv%	1	2	3
UUP	Jack Leahy*	20.69%	1,327		
SDLP	Thomas Murray*	15.72%	1,008	1,361	
Independent	James McBarron	18.79%	1,205	1,212	1,257
Unity	John McCusker*	14.95%	959	1,044	1,054
Unity	John McMahon*	12.58%	807	843	847
UUP	Thomas Johnston	9.64%	618	620	
SDLP	Ann McQuillan	7.63%	489		
Electorate: 7,708 Valid: 6,413 (83.20%) Spoilt: 189 Quota: 1,283 Turnout: 6,602 (85.65%)

== 1973 Election ==
1973: 2 x Unity, 1 x Independent Unionist, 1 x Independent Nationalist

Fermanagh Area A - 4 seats
Party	Candidate	FPv%	Count		
Party	Candidate	FPv%	1	2	3
Ind. Unionist	Jack Leahy	20.07%	1,242		
Unity	John McCusker	19.59%	1,212	1,242	
Ind. Nationalist	Thomas Murray	15.94%	986	1,049	1,068
Unity	John McMahon	13.88%	859	897	913
Independent	Hugh Reilly	12.90%	798	871	880
Ind. Unionist	Samuel Hutchinson	12.38%	766	836	
Alliance	Maurice Watts	5.24%	324		
Electorate: 7,332 Valid: 6,187 (84.38%) Spoilt: 86 Quota: 1,238 Turnout: 6,273 (85.56%)
