= 1973 Fermanagh District Council election =

Local government election in Northern Ireland

30 May 1973	1977 →

All 20 seats to Fermanagh District Council 11 seats needed for a majority
	First party	Second party	Third party
Party	UUP	SDLP	Unity
Seats won	8	4	4
	Fourth party	Fifth party
Party	Ind. Unionist	Ind. Nationalist
Seats won	2	2

Elections to Fermanagh District Council were held on 30 May 1973 on the same day as the other Northern Irish local government elections. The election used five district electoral areas to elect a total of 20 councillors.

== Election results ==
Party	Seats	±	First Pref. votes	FPv%	±%
UUP	8		8,412	28.2	
Unity	4		7,212	24.3	
SDLP	4		3,540	11.9	
Ind. Unionist	2		3,504	11.7	
Ind. Nationalist	2		1,924	6.4	
Alliance	0		2,285	7.7	
DUP	0		1,495	5.0	
Independent	0		1,482	5.0	
Totals	20		29,854	100.0	—

== Districts summary ==
Results of the Fermanagh District Council election, 1973 by district
Ward	%	Cllrs	%	Cllrs	%	Cllrs	%	Cllrs	Total Cllrs
Ward	UUP		Unity		SDLP		Others		Total Cllrs
Area A	0.0	0	33.5	2	0.0	0	66.5	2	4
Area B	56.4	2	33.2	1	0.0	0	10.4	0	4
Area C	33.7	2	35.4	1	0.0	0	30.9	1	4
Area D	38.9	2	6.9	0	31.3	2	22.9	0	4
Area E	13.3	1	11.6	0	28.3	2	46.8	1	5
Total	28.2	8	24.3	4	11.9	4	35.6	4	20

== Districts results ==
=== Area A ===
1973: 2 x Unity, 1 x Independent Unionist, 1 x Independent Nationalist

Fermanagh Area A - 4 seats
Party	Candidate	FPv%	Count		
Party	Candidate	FPv%	1	2	3
Ind. Unionist	Jack Leahy	20.07%	1,242		
Unity	John McCusker	19.59%	1,212	1,242	
Ind. Nationalist	Thomas Murray	15.94%	986	1,049	1,068
Unity	John McMahon	13.88%	859	897	913
Independent	Hugh Reilly	12.90%	798	871	880
Ind. Unionist	Samuel Hutchinson	12.38%	766	836	
Alliance	Maurice Watts	5.24%	324		
Electorate: 7,332 Valid: 6,187 (84.38%) Spoilt: 86 Quota: 1,238 Turnout: 6,273 (85.56%)

=== Area B ===
1973: 3 x UUP, 1 x Unity

Fermanagh Area B - 4 seats
Party	Candidate	FPv%	Count			
Party	Candidate	FPv%	1	2	3	4
Unity	James Breen	27.49%	1,584			
UUP	Cecil Noble	25.13%	1,448			
UUP	Norman Brown	18.48%	1,065	1,068.51	1,167.51	
UUP	James Nethercott	12.83%	739	741.43	910.23	1,251.23
Unity	Margaret Traynor	5.73%	330	727.71	727.91	838.67
DUP	Irene Hughes	5.38%	310	311.35	327.75	
Alliance	James Henderson	4.96%	286	302.2	306.8	
Electorate: 6,666 Valid: 5,762 (86.44%) Spoilt: 88 Quota: 1,153 Turnout: 5,850 (87.76%)

=== Area C ===
1973: 2 x UUP, 1 x Unity, 1 x Independent Nationalist

Fermanagh Area C - 4 seats
Party	Candidate	FPv%	Count					
Party	Candidate	FPv%	1	2	3	4	5	6
UUP	Wilson Elliott	26.20%	1,581					
Ind. Nationalist	Patrick Flanagan	15.54%	938	939.38	939.38	1,297.38		
Unity	Francis Stewart	13.19%	796	796.69	802.15	848.38	917.88	1,201.86
UUP	Richard Thornton	7.46%	450	732.9	962.74	962.97	962.97	1,050.56
Unity	Patrick McCaffrey	13.70%	827	827.92	828.92	840.92	851.17	1,037.84
Alliance	Brian Finn	10.97%	662	673.96	690.87	781.1	789.85	
Unity	Patrick O'Flanagan	8.47%	511	511.69	512.69			
DUP	Kenneth Scott	4.47%	270	330.72				
Electorate: 6,855 Valid: 6,035 (88.04%) Spoilt: 84 Quota: 1,208 Turnout: 6,119 (89.26%)

=== Area D ===
1973: 2 x SDLP, 2 x UUP

Fermanagh Area D - 5 seats
Party	Candidate	FPv%	Count										
Party	Candidate	FPv%	1	2	3	4	5	6	7	8	9	10	11
UUP	Francis Gage	18.87%	1,143	1,160	1,168	1,194	1,282						
SDLP	John Maguire	13.21%	800	801	802	857	857	857	1,082	1,363			
UUP	Ben Loane	11.51%	697	706	712	724	836	884	885	885	1,411		
SDLP	Thomas Daly	11.13%	674	674	674	690	690	690	756	976	976	978	1,125.32
Independent	David Brien	11.29%	684	697	700	778	850	856	871	882	919	1,095	1,097.32
UUP	Warren Loane	8.50%	515	516	520	534	572	583	583	584			
SDLP	John Monaghan	7.00%	424	430	430	438	438	438	536				
Unity	James Gallagher	6.90%	418	418	418	426	427	428					
DUP	Crowe	4.94%	299	299	383	383							
Alliance	Anthony Ruddy	1.80%	109	137	137								
Alliance	Robert Stewart	1.68%	102	113	113								
DUP	Samuel Robinson	1.75%	106	106									
Alliance	Jack Askwith	1.44%	87										
Electorate: 6,993 Valid: 6,058 (86.63%) Spoilt: 60 Quota: 1,212 Turnout: 6,118 (87.49%)

=== Area E ===
1973: 2 x SDLP, 1 x UUP, 1 x Independent Unionist

Fermanagh Area E - 4 seats
Party	Candidate	FPv%	Count									
Party	Candidate	FPv%	1	2	3	4	5	6	7	8	9	10
Ind. Unionist	George Cathcart	25.74%	1,496									
UUP	Thomas Scott	13.32%	774	1,007.42	1,007.42	1,008.96	1,009.18	1,012.06	1,012.06	1,429.06		
SDLP	James Lunny	12.04%	700	700	715	723	738	778.44	1,007.32	1,020.98	1,024.98	1,263.98
SDLP	Mary Corrigan	9.64%	560	561.54	568.54	572.54	578.54	590.54	706.54	712.76	713.76	939.76
Alliance	Marjorie Moore	4.70%	273	290.6	307.6	405.98	407.98	599.26	611.26	659.74	721.74	745.4
Unity	John McManus	6.62%	385	385.22	426.22	427.44	638.44	645.66	678.66	688.66	689.66	
DUP	Robert Donaldson	8.77%	510	560.82	561.82	576.02	578.02	582.78	586.78			
SDLP	James Donnelly	6.57%	382	382.88	388.88	392.88	397.88	408.88				
Alliance	James Falconer	3.66%	213	219.82	231.82	281.46	281.46					
Unity	Anthony Maguire	3.65%	212	212	245.22	247.22						
Alliance	Herfort Ritchie	2.89%	168	181.86	187.86							
Unity	Joseph Owens	1.34%	78	78								
Alliance	Edward Love	1.05%	61	61.44								
Electorate: 7,232 Valid: 5,812 (80.37%) Spoilt: 75 Quota: 1,163 Turnout: 5,887 (81.40%)
