= 1993 Fermanagh District Council election =

Local government election in Northern Ireland

| ← 1989 | 19 May 1993 | 1997 → |

All 23 seats to Fermanagh District Council 12 seats needed for a majority
| | First party | Second party | Third party |
|---|---|---|---|
| Party | UUP | SDLP | Sinn Féin |
| Seats won | 10 | 5 | 3 |
| Seat change | 0 | 0 | ▼1 |
| | Fourth party | Fifth party | Sixth party |
| Party | DUP | Ind. Nationalist | Independent Socialist |
| Seats won | 2 | 2 | 1 |
| Seat change | 0 | ▲1 | ▲1 |
| | Seventh party |
| Party | Workers' Party |
| Seats won | 0 |
| Seat change | ▼1 |
- Results by district electoral area, shaded by First Preference Votes.

Elections to Fermanagh District Council were held on 19 May 1993 on the same day as the other Northern Irish local government elections. The election used four district electoral areas to elect a total of 23 councillors.

== Election results ==
Fermanagh District Council Election Result 1993
| Party | Seats | Gains | Losses | Net gain/loss | Seats % | Votes % | Votes | +/− |
|---|---|---|---|---|---|---|---|---|
| UUP | 10 | 0 | 0 | 0 | 43.5 | 39.5 | 11,512 | ▼0.4 |
| SDLP | 5 | 0 | 0 | 0 | 21.7 | 19.3 | 5,629 | ▲0.6 |
| Sinn Féin | 3 | 0 | 1 | ▼1 | 13.0 | 17.1 | 4,976 | ▼3.3 |
| DUP | 2 | 0 | 0 | 0 | 8.7 | 9.5 | 2,782 | ▲0.9 |
| Ind. Nationalist | 2 | 1 | 0 | ▲1 | 8.7 | 9.4 | 2,725 | ▲4.1 |
| Independent Socialist | 1 | 1 | 0 | ▲1 | 4.3 | 3.3 | 953 | ▲2.7 |
| Ind. Republican | 0 | 0 | 0 | 0 | 0.0 | 1.9 | 563 | ▲0.3 |

Note: "Votes" are the first preference votes.

== Districts summary ==
Results of the Fermanagh District Council election, 1993 by district
| Ward | % | Cllrs | % | Cllrs | % | Cllrs | % | Cllrs | % | Cllrs | Total Cllrs |
| Ward | UUP | | Sinn Féin | | SDLP | | DUP | | Others | | Total Cllrs |
|---|---|---|---|---|---|---|---|---|---|---|---|
| Enniskillen | 47.6 | 3 | 12.3 | 1 | 17.3 | 1 | 10.9 | 1 | 11.9 | 1 | 7 |
| Erne East | 36.6 | 3 | 25.5 | 1 | 17.0 | 1 | 5.2 | 0 | 15.7 | 1 | 6 |
| Erne North | 42.9 | 2 | 6.9 | 1 | 30.0 | 2 | 20.2 | 1 | 0.0 | 0 | 5 |
| Erne West | 30.6 | 2 | 22.2 | 1 | 15.1 | 1 | 3.0 | 0 | 29.1 | 1 | 5 |
| Total | 39.5 | 10 | 19.3 | 5 | 17.1 | 3 | 9.5 | 2 | 14.6 | 3 | 23 |

== District results ==
=== Enniskillen ===
1989: 3 x UUP, 1 x SDLP, 1 x Sinn Féin, 1 x DUP, 1 x Workers' Party
1993: 3 x UUP, 1 x SDLP, 1 x Sinn Féin, 1 x DUP, 1 x Independent Socialist
1989-1993 Change: Independent Socialist leaves Workers' Party

Enniskillen - 7 seats
| Party | Candidate | FPv% | Count | | | | | | |
| Party | Candidate | FPv% | 1 | 2 | 3 | 4 | 5 | 6 | 7 |
|---|---|---|---|---|---|---|---|---|---|
| UUP | Samuel Foster* | 20.12% | 1,605 | | | | | | |
| UUP | Raymond Ferguson* | 14.53% | 1,159 | | | | | | |
| SDLP | James Lunny* | 8.74% | 697 | 699.66 | 702.88 | 703.02 | 1,247.02 | | |
| Independent Socialist | Davy Kettyles* | 11.95% | 953 | 965.16 | 971.74 | 980.54 | 1,041.54 | | |
| Sinn Féin | John McManus | 12.26% | 978 | 978 | 978.14 | 978.14 | 1,007.14 | | |
| UUP | William Hetherington* | 9.23% | 736 | 920.68 | 949.52 | 984.06 | 985.2 | 1,006.2 | |
| DUP | Joseph Dodds | 6.05% | 483 | 527.84 | 533.86 | 875.44 | 875.58 | 876.58 | 877.58 |
| UUP | Ethel Gregg | 3.75% | 299 | 619.72 | 728.08 | 757.66 | 761.8 | 817.8 | 823.8 |
| SDLP | James Donnelly | 8.51% | 679 | 679.38 | 680.08 | 682.08 | | | |
| DUP | Frederick Black | 4.86% | 388 | 422.58 | 427.34 | | | | |
Electorate: 12,304 Valid: 7,977 (64.83%) Spoilt: 131 Quota: 998 Turnout: 8,108 (65.90%)

=== Erne East ===
1989: 3 x UUP, 2 x Sinn Féin, 1 x SDLP
1993: 3 x UUP, 1 x Sinn Féin, 1 x SDLP, 1 x Independent Nationalist
1989-1993 Change: Independent Nationalist gain from Sinn Féin

Erne East - 6 seats
| Party | Candidate | FPv% | Count | | | | | | | |
| Party | Candidate | FPv% | 1 | 2 | 3 | 4 | 5 | 6 | 7 | 8 |
|---|---|---|---|---|---|---|---|---|---|---|
| SDLP | Fergus McQuillan* | 17.01% | 1,398 | | | | | | | |
| UUP | Jean McVitty* | 13.71% | 1,127 | 1,132.94 | | | | | | |
| Ind. Nationalist | Tony McPhillips | 8.78% | 722 | 806.78 | 829.4 | 829.4 | 1,235.9 | | | |
| Sinn Féin | Gerry McHugh | 9.54% | 784 | 794.08 | 1,085.6 | 1,085.78 | 1,188.78 | | | |
| UUP | Cecil Noble* | 11.87% | 976 | 976.36 | 976.36 | 1,171.36 | 1,173.44 | 1,225.12 | | |
| UUP | Albert Liddle* | 11.01% | 905 | 906.44 | 906.44 | 1,038.44 | 1,043.16 | 1,081.24 | 1,083.22 | 1,128.78 |
| Sinn Féin | Brian McCaffrey* | 10.15% | 834 | 844.44 | 922.34 | 923.34 | 1,009.5 | 1,009.5 | 1,039.38 | 1,039.38 |
| Ind. Republican | John McCusker | 6.85% | 563 | 659.48 | 701.54 | 702.72 | | | | |
| DUP | Paul Robinson | 5.84% | 480 | 480.36 | 480.36 | | | | | |
| Sinn Féin | Philip McDonald | 5.24% | 431 | 439.46 | | | | | | |
Electorate: 10,129 Valid: 8,220 (81.15%) Spoilt: 158 Quota: 1,175 Turnout: 8,378 (82.71%)

=== Erne North ===
1989: 2 x UUP, 2 x SDLP, 1 x DUP
1993: 2 x UUP, 2 x SDLP, 1 x DUP
1989-1993 Change: No change

Erne North - 5 seats
| Party | Candidate | FPv% | Count | | | | |
| Party | Candidate | FPv% | 1 | 2 | 3 | 4 | 5 |
|---|---|---|---|---|---|---|---|
| UUP | Caldwell McClaughry* | 24.53% | 1,486 | | | | |
| DUP | Bert Johnston* | 17.04% | 1,032 | | | | |
| SDLP | Tommy Gallagher* | 16.33% | 989 | 991.56 | 992.56 | 1,172.56 | |
| UUP | Bertie Kerr | 11.13% | 674 | 847.44 | 947.68 | 948.68 | 949.68 |
| SDLP | John O'Kane* | 13.65% | 827 | 831.48 | 832.8 | 960.8 | 1,092.8 |
| UUP | Simon Loane* | 7.21% | 437 | 704.52 | 779.36 | 780.36 | 781.36 |
| Sinn Féin | Desmond Donnelly | 6.95% | 421 | 421 | 426 | | |
| DUP | John Armstrong | 3.17% | 192 | 210.24 | | | |
Electorate: 8,201 Valid: 6,058 (73.87%) Spoilt: 113 Quota: 1,010 Turnout: 6,171 (75.25%)

=== Erne West ===
1989: 2 x UUP, 1 x Sinn Féin, 1 x SDLP, 1 x Independent Nationalist
1993: 2 x UUP, 1 x Sinn Féin, 1 x SDLP, 1 x Independent Nationalist
1989-1993 Change: No change

Erne West - 5 seats
| Party | Candidate | FPv% | Count | | | | | |
| Party | Candidate | FPv% | 1 | 2 | 3 | 4 | 5 | 6 |
|---|---|---|---|---|---|---|---|---|
| UUP | Wilson Elliott* | 21.89% | 1,507 | | | | | |
| Ind. Nationalist | Patrick McCaffrey* | 21.23% | 1,462 | | | | | |
| SDLP | Gerry Gallagher* | 15.09% | 1,039 | 1,042.12 | 1,120.55 | 1,159.55 | | |
| UUP | Derrick Nixon* | 8.73% | 601 | 937.48 | 939.78 | 1,139.82 | 1,160.82 | |
| Sinn Féin | Robin Martin | 10.60% | 730 | 730.24 | 785.67 | 844.44 | 937.13 | 939.13 |
| Sinn Féin | Francis Doherty | 7.96% | 548 | 548.24 | 578.6 | 708.51 | 915.78 | 915.78 |
| Ind. Nationalist | Patrick Flanagan | 7.86% | 541 | 542.92 | 674.94 | 696.72 | | |
| SDLP | Stephen Huggett | 3.63% | 250 | 250.72 | 260.61 | | | |
| DUP | Jack Thompson | 3.01% | 207 | 220.44 | 221.13 | | | |
Electorate: 8,474 Valid: 6,885 (81.25%) Spoilt: 180 Quota: 1,148 Turnout: 7,065 (83.37%)
