= 2005 Fermanagh District Council election =

Local government election in Northern Ireland

← 2001	5 May 2005	2011 →

All 23 seats to Fermanagh District Council 12 seats needed for a majority
	First party	Second party	Third party
Party	Sinn Féin	UUP	SDLP
Seats won	9	5	5
Seat change	0	▼2	▲1
	Fourth party	Fifth party
Party	DUP	Independent
Seats won	4	0
Seat change	▲2	▼1
- 2005 Fermanagh District Council election results by district

Elections to Fermanagh District Council were held on 5 May 2005 on the same day as the other Northern Irish local government elections. The election used four district electoral areas to elect a total of 23 councillors.

== Election results ==
Fermanagh District Council Election Result 2005
Party	Seats	Gains	Losses	Net gain/loss	Seats %	Votes %	Votes	+/−
Sinn Féin	9	0	0	0	39.1	37.4	11,611	▲3.9
UUP	5	0	2	▼1	21.7	22.0	6,830	▼8.8
SDLP	5	1	0	▲1	13.0	18.0	5,566	▼0.7
DUP	4	2	0	▲2	17.4	20.6	6,399	▲8.5
Independent	0	0	1	▼1	0.0	0.4	115	▼3.9
Socialist Party	0	0	0	0	0.0	1.3	406	New
Green (NI)	0	0	0	0	0.0	0.3	79	New

Note: "Votes" are the first preference votes.

== Districts summary ==
Results of the Fermanagh District Council election, 2005 by district
Ward	%	Cllrs	%	Cllrs	%	Cllrs	%	Cllrs	%	Cllrs	Total Cllrs
Ward	Sinn Féin		UUP		SDLP		DUP		Others		Total Cllrs
Enniskillen	28.5	2	20.5	1	18.2	2	28.2	2	4.6	0	7
Erne East	52.5	3	19.8	1	13.2	1	14.5	1	0.0	0	6
Erne North	18.5	1	33.4	2	20.1	1	27.9	1	0.0	0	5
Erne West	46.3	3	16.7	1	21.6	1	12.6	0	2.8	0	5
Total	37.4	9	22.0	5	18.0	5	20.6	4	2.0	0	23

== District results ==
=== Enniskillen ===
2001: 2 x Sinn Féin, 2 x UUP, 1 x SDLP, 1 x DUP, 1 x Independent
2005: 2 x Sinn Féin, 2 x DUP, 2 x SDLP, 1 x UUP
2001-2005 Change: DUP and SDLP gain from UUP and Independent

Enniskillen - 7 seats
Party	Candidate	FPv%	Count						
Party	Candidate	FPv%	1	2	3	4	5	6	7
DUP	Arlene Foster	23.57%	2,054						
DUP	Joseph Dodds*	4.59%	400	1,132.73					
UUP	Robert Irvine*	6.61%	576	660.6	694.48	1,097.48			
Sinn Féin	Gerry McHugh*	9.62%	838	838.47	855.47	855.47	855.5	1,308.5	
Sinn Féin	Pat Cox*	11.06%	964	964.47	1,011.47	1,012.47	1,012.47	1,195.47	
SDLP	Frank Britton*	10.51%	916	918.35	1,046.35	1,058.58	1,060.23	1,094.23	
SDLP	Patricia Rodgers	7.66%	668	670.35	742.35	751.52	752.96	772.96	973.96
UUP	Raymond Ferguson*	7.83%	682	742.63	770.57	912.35	942.26	943.73	950.73
Sinn Féin	Paddy Gilgunn*	7.85%	684	684.94	717.41	718.41	718.41		
UUP	Basil Johnston	6.05%	527	586.69	601.16				
Socialist Party	Paul Dale	4.66%	406	412.11					
Electorate: 13,101 Valid: 8,715 (66.52%) Spoilt: 163 Quota: 1,090 Turnout: 8,878 (67.77%)

=== Erne East ===
2001: 3 x Sinn Féin, 2 x UUP, 1 x SDLP
2005: 3 x Sinn Féin, 1 x UUP, 1 x DUP, 1 x SDLP
2001-2005 Change: DUP gain from UUP

Erne East - 6 seats
Party	Candidate	FPv%	Count			
Party	Candidate	FPv%	1	2	3	4
DUP	Paul Robinson	14.52%	1,277			
UUP	Harold Andrews*	11.62%	1,022	1,705		
SDLP	Fergus McQuillan*	13.16%	1,157	1,169	1,555	
Sinn Féin	Ruth Lynch*	13.61%	1,197	1,198	1,198	1,203
Sinn Féin	Tom O'Reilly*	13.41%	1,179	1,179	1,179	1,191
Sinn Féin	Brian McCaffrey*	12.87%	1,132	1,133	1,137	1,141
Sinn Féin	Seán Lynch	12.62%	1,110	1,110	1,110	1,111
UUP	Jean McVitty	8.18%	719			
Electorate: 11,003 Valid: 8,793 (79.91%) Spoilt: 140 Quota: 1,257 Turnout: 8,933 (81.19%)

=== Erne North ===
2001: 2 x UUP, 1 x DUP, 1 x Sinn Féin, 1 x SDLP
2005: 2 x UUP, 1 x DUP, 1 x Sinn Féin, 1 x SDLP
2001-2005 Change: No change

Erne North - 5 seats
Party	Candidate	FPv%	Count						
Party	Candidate	FPv%	1	2	3	4	5	6	7
UUP	Tom Elliott*	26.81%	1,686						
Sinn Féin	Breege McSorley	18.54%	1,166						
DUP	Bert Johnston*	16.48%	1,036	1,149.24					
SDLP	John O'Kane*	11.91%	749	756.22	819.53	829.46	1,273.46		
UUP	Bertie Kerr*	3.24%	204	544.1	545.43	796.67	819.26	904.26	979.86
DUP	Mandy Mahon	11.45%	720	743.94	744.72	825.75	832.94	848.94	872.39
SDLP	Julie Dervan	8.22%	517	521.56	564.98	567.49			
UUP	Gary Wilson	3.34%	210	354.4	354.79				
Electorate: 8,898 Valid: 6,288 (70.67%) Spoilt: 111 Quota: 1,049 Turnout: 6,399 (71.92%)

=== Erne West ===
2001: 3 x Sinn Féin, 1 x UUP, 1 x SDLP
2005: 3 x Sinn Féin, 1 x UUP, 1 x SDLP
2001-2005 Change: No change

Erne West - 5 seats
Party	Candidate	FPv%	Count			
Party	Candidate	FPv%	1	2	3	4
SDLP	Gerry Gallagher*	21.62%	1,559			
Sinn Féin	Stephen Huggett*	15.55%	1,121	1,240.48		
Sinn Féin	Póilín Uí Catháin	15.73%	1,134	1,175.18	1,210.18	
Sinn Féin	Bernice Swift	15.06%	1,086	1,153.86	1,207.86	
UUP	Alex Baird	9.56%	689	702.92	728.23	1,153.34
DUP	Cyril Brownlee	12.65%	912	916.93	922.80	1,022.99
UUP	Derrick Nixon	7.14%	515	532.69	561.32	
Independent	Kevin Nolan	1.60%	115	158.79		
Green (NI)	Laurence Speight	1.10%	79	125.69		
Electorate: 9,424 Valid: 7,210 (76.51%) Spoilt: 135 Quota: 1,202 Turnout: 7,345 (77.94%)
