= Erne West (District Electoral Area) =

District electoral area in Northern Ireland

- Fermanagh and Omagh District Council DEA constituency

Current constituency
- Created: 1985
- Seats: 5 (1985-)
- Councillors: Elaine Brough (SF); Anthony Feely (SF); Adam Gannon (SDLP); Declan McArdle (SF); Mark Ovens (UUP)

Erne West DEA within Fermanagh and Omagh

Erne West DEA (1993-2014) within Fermanagh

Erne West is one of the seven district electoral areas (DEA) in Fermanagh and Omagh, Northern Ireland. The district elects five members to Fermanagh and Omagh District Council and contains the wards of Belcoo and Garrison, Boho, Cleenish and Letterbreen, Derrygonnelly, Derrylin and Florence Court and Kinawley. Erne West forms part of the Fermanagh and South Tyrone constituencies for the Northern Ireland Assembly and UK Parliament.

It was created for the 1985 local elections, replacing Fermanagh Area A and Fermanagh Area C which had existed since 1973, where it originally contained five wards (Belcoo and Garrison, Boho, Cleenish and Letterbreen, Derrygonnelly, Derrylin and Florence Court and Kinawley).

== Councillors ==
Election	Councillor (Party)	Councillor (Party)	Councillor (Party)	Councillor (Party)	Councillor (Party)
2023	Anthony Feely (Sinn Féin)	Declan McArdle (Sinn Féin)	Elaine Brough (Sinn Féin)	Adam Gannon (SDLP)	Mark Ovens (UUP)
2019	Anthony Feely (Sinn Féin)	Chris McCaffrey (Sinn Féin)	Bernice Swift (Sinn Féin)/ (Independent)	Adam Gannon (SDLP)	Alex Baird (UUP)
2014	Anthony Feely (Sinn Féin)	Barry Doherty (Sinn Féin)	Bernice Swift (Sinn Féin)/ (Independent)	Brendan Gallagher (SDLP)	Alex Baird (UUP)
2011	Frankie Rice (Sinn Féin)	Barry Doherty (Sinn Féin)	Bernice Swift (Sinn Féin)/ (Independent)	Brendan Gallagher (SDLP)	Alex Baird (UUP)
2005	Stephen Huggett (Sinn Féin)	Póilín Uí Cathaín (Sinn Féin)	Bernice Swift (Sinn Féin)/ (Independent)	Gerry Gallagher (SDLP)	Alex Baird (UUP)
2001	Stephen Huggett (Sinn Féin)	Robin Martin (Sinn Féin)	Pat Cox (Sinn Féin)	Gerry Gallagher (SDLP)	Wilson Elliott (UUP)
1997	Patrick McCaffrey (IIP)/ (Independent Nationalist)	Robin Martin (Sinn Féin)	Derrick Nixon (UUP)	Gerry Gallagher (SDLP)	Wilson Elliott (UUP)
1993	Patrick McCaffrey (IIP)/ (Independent Nationalist)	Robin Martin (Sinn Féin)	Derrick Nixon (UUP)	Gerry Gallagher (SDLP)	Wilson Elliott (UUP)
1989	Patrick McCaffrey (IIP)/ (Independent Nationalist)	Paul Corrigan (Sinn Féin)	Derrick Nixon (UUP)	Gerry Gallagher (SDLP)	Wilson Elliott (UUP)
1985	Patrick McCaffrey (IIP)/ (Independent Nationalist)	Paul Corrigan (Sinn Féin)	Patrick McBrien (Sinn Féin)	Gerry Gallagher (SDLP)	Wilson Elliott (UUP)

== 2023 Election ==
2019: 2 x Sinn Féin, 1 x UUP, 1 x SDLP, 1 x Independent

2023: 3 x Sinn Féin, 1 x UUP, 1 x SDLP

2019–2023 Change: Sinn Féin gain from Independent

Erne West - 5 seats
Party	Candidate	FPv%	Count				
Party	Candidate	FPv%	1	2	3	4	5
Sinn Féin	Anthony Feely*	19.68%	1,493				
Sinn Féin	Elaine Brough	17.95%	1,362				
Sinn Féin	Declan McArdle	16.56%	1,256	1,426.40			
SDLP	Adam Gannon*	11.01%	835	869.35	1,005.55	1,053.40	1,313.40
UUP	Mark Ovens	15.78%	1,197	1,198.35	1,250.35	1,250.95	1,273.95
DUP	Aaron Elliott	9.06%	687	687.90	692.90	693.05	699.05
Independent	Paul McColdrick	6.67%	506	517.85	555.15	580.65	
Alliance	Gerard McCusker	3.30%	250	251.95			
Electorate: 11,196 Valid: 7,586 (67.76%) Spoilt: 66 Quota: 1,265 Turnout: 7,652 (68.35%)

== 2019 Election ==
2014: 2 x Sinn Féin, 1 x SDLP, 1 x UUP, 1 x Independent

2019: 2 x Sinn Féin, 1 x SDLP, 1 x UUP, 1 x Independent

2014-2019 Change: No change

Erne West - 5 seats
Party	Candidate	FPv%	Count			
Party	Candidate	FPv%	1	2	3	4
UUP	Alex Baird*	18.05%	1,333			
Independent	Bernice Swift*	15.69%	1,159	1,160.05	1,295.05	
Sinn Féin	Anthony Feely*	16.36%	1,208	1,208.14	1,238.14	
Sinn Féin	Chris McCaffrey	15.38%	1,136	1,136	1,153	1,154.56
SDLP	Adam Gannon	8.27%	611	619.82	799.8	1,116.59
Sinn Féin	Fionnuala Leonard	11.90%	879	879	895	898.28
DUP	Carol Johnston	7.41%	547	601.88	712.65	
Independent	Trevor Armstrong	6.93%	512	537.27		
Electorate: 10,825 Valid: 7,385 (68.22%) Spoilt: 88 Quota: 1,231 Turnout: 7,473 (69.03%)

== 2014 Election ==
2011: 2 x Sinn Féin, 1 x UUP, 1 x SDLP, 1 x Independent

2014: 2 x Sinn Féin, 1 x UUP, 1 x SDLP, 1 x Independent

2011-2014 Change: No change

Erne West - 5 seats
Party	Candidate	FPv%	Count					
Party	Candidate	FPv%	1	2	3	4	5	6
UUP	Alex Baird*	23.39%	1,619					
Independent	Bernice Swift*	17.26%	1,195					
Sinn Féin	Barry Doherty*	14.23%	985	987.48	993.09	1,567.09		
Sinn Féin	Anthony Feely	13.66%	946	946.93	956.47	1,083.41	1,465.61	
SDLP	Brendan Gallagher	13.90%	962	1,014.39	1,024.83	1,090.67	1,120.07	1,199.87
DUP	Jeremy Campbell	6.14%	425	831.1	831.37	831.37	832.21	834.73
Sinn Féin	Leanne Maguire	11.43%	791	791.43	798.47			
Electorate: 10,279 Valid: 6,923 (67.35%) Spoilt: 88 Quota: 1,154 Turnout: 7,011 (68.21%)

== 2011 Election ==
2005: 3 x Sinn Féin, 1 x UUP, 1 x SDLP

2011: 2 x Sinn Féin, 1 x UUP, 1 x SDLP, 1 x Independent

2005-2011 Change: Independent leaves Sinn Féin

Erne West - 5 seats
Party	Candidate	FPv%	Count			
Party	Candidate	FPv%	1	2	3	4
SDLP	Brendan Gallagher	17.04%	1,265			
UUP	Alex Baird*	16.95%	1,259			
Sinn Féin	Frankie Rice	14.79%	1,098	1,101	1,636	
Sinn Féin	Barry Doherty	15.61%	1,159	1,159	1,274	
Independent	Bernice Swift*	13.52%	1,004	1,010	1,078	1,224
DUP	Alan Hassard	9.61%	714	846	847	850
Sinn Féin	Stephen Huggett*	10.19%	757	757		
UUP	Ruth Wilson	2.29%	170			
Electorate: 10,250 Valid: 7,426 (72.45%) Spoilt: 160 Quota: 1,238 Turnout: 7,586 (74.01%)

== 2005 Election ==
2001: 3 x Sinn Féin, 1 x UUP, 1 x SDLP

2005: 3 x Sinn Féin, 1 x UUP, 1 x SDLP

2001-2005 Change: No change

Erne West - 5 seats
Party	Candidate	FPv%	Count			
Party	Candidate	FPv%	1	2	3	4
SDLP	Gerry Gallagher*	21.62%	1,559			
Sinn Féin	Stephen Huggett*	15.55%	1,121	1,240.48		
Sinn Féin	Póilín Uí Catháin	15.73%	1,134	1,175.18	1,210.18	
Sinn Féin	Bernice Swift	15.06%	1,086	1,153.86	1,207.86	
UUP	Alex Baird	9.56%	689	702.92	728.23	1,153.34
DUP	Cyril Brownlee	12.65%	912	916.93	922.80	1,022.99
UUP	Derrick Nixon	7.14%	515	532.69	561.32	
Independent	Kevin Nolan	1.60%	115	158.79		
Green (NI)	Laurence Speight	1.10%	79	125.69		
Electorate: 9,424 Valid: 7,210 (76.51%) Spoilt: 135 Quota: 1,202 Turnout: 7,345 (77.94%)

== 2001 Election ==
1997: 2 x UUP, 1 x Sinn Féin, 1 x SDLP, 1 x Independent Nationalist

2001: 3 x Sinn Féin, 1 x UUP, 1 x SDLP

1997-2001 Change: Sinn Féin (two seats) gain from UUP and Independent Nationalist

Erne West - 5 seats
Party	Candidate	FPv%	Count		
Party	Candidate	FPv%	1	2	3
SDLP	Gerry Gallagher*	21.62%	1,578		
Sinn Féin	Pat Cox	17.34%	1,266		
Sinn Féin	Stephen Huggett	15.22%	1,111	1,112	1,298.66
Sinn Féin	Robin Martin*	15.60%	1,139	1,140	1,253.22
UUP	Wilson Elliott*	13.44%	981	1,179	1,217.08
UUP	Derrick Nixon*	11.40%	832	979	1,000.42
DUP	David Black	5.37%	392		
Electorate: 9,196 Valid: 7,299 (79.37%) Spoilt: 167 Quota: 1,217 Turnout: 7,466 (81.19%)

== 1997 Election ==
1993: 2 x UUP, 1 x Sinn Féin, 1 x SDLP, 1 x Independent Nationalist

1997: 2 x UUP, 1 x Sinn Féin, 1 x SDLP, 1 x Independent Nationalist

1993-1997 Change: No change

Erne West - 5 seats
Party	Candidate	FPv%	Count				
Party	Candidate	FPv%	1	2	3	4	5
UUP	Wilson Elliott*	23.88%	1,616				
Ind. Nationalist	Patrick McCaffrey*	18.47%	1,250				
Sinn Féin	Robin Martin*	17.42%	1,179				
SDLP	Gerry Gallagher*	15.83%	1,071	1,077.6	1,183.6		
UUP	Derrick Nixon*	9.04%	612	1,078.8	1,088.2	1,100.6	1,113.6
Sinn Féin	Stephen Huggett	12.75%	863	863.9	892.2	996.8	1,025.8
NI Women's Coalition	Imelda Maguire	2.60%	176	180.2			
Electorate: 8,872 Valid: 6,767 (76.27%) Spoilt: 149 Quota: 1,128 Turnout: 6,916 (77.95%)

== 1993 Election ==
1989: 2 x UUP, 1 x Sinn Féin, 1 x SDLP, 1 x Independent Nationalist

1993: 2 x UUP, 1 x Sinn Féin, 1 x SDLP, 1 x Independent Nationalist

1989-1993 Change: No change

Erne West - 5 seats
Party	Candidate	FPv%	Count					
Party	Candidate	FPv%	1	2	3	4	5	6
UUP	Wilson Elliott*	21.89%	1,507					
Ind. Nationalist	Patrick McCaffrey*	21.23%	1,462					
SDLP	Gerry Gallagher*	15.09%	1,039	1,042.12	1,120.55	1,159.55		
UUP	Derrick Nixon*	8.73%	601	937.48	939.78	1,139.82	1,160.82	
Sinn Féin	Robin Martin	10.60%	730	730.24	785.67	844.44	937.13	939.13
Sinn Féin	Francis Doherty	7.96%	548	548.24	578.6	708.51	915.78	915.78
Ind. Nationalist	Patrick Flanagan	7.86%	541	542.92	674.94	696.72		
SDLP	Stephen Huggett	3.63%	250	250.72	260.61			
DUP	Jack Thompson	3.01%	207	220.44	221.13			
Electorate: 8,474 Valid: 6,885 (81.25%) Spoilt: 180 Quota: 1,148 Turnout: 7,065 (83.37%)

== 1989 Election ==
1985: 2 x Sinn Féin, 1 x UUP, 1 x SDLP, 1 x IIP

1989: 2 x UUP, 1 x Sinn Féin, 1 x SDLP, 1 x Independent Nationalist

1985-1989 Change: UUP gain from Sinn Féin, Independent Nationalist leaves IIP

Erne West - 5 seats
Party	Candidate	FPv%	Count			
Party	Candidate	FPv%	1	2	3	4
Ind. Nationalist	Patrick McCaffrey*	23.60%	1,604			
UUP	Wilson Elliott*	20.55%	1,397			
Sinn Féin	Paul Corrigan*	17.45%	1,186			
SDLP	Gerry Gallagher*	13.08%	889	1,055.6	1,265.6	
UUP	Derrick Nixon	12.81%	871	875.08	880.46	1,138.86
Sinn Féin	Vincent Martin	8.75%	595	754.12	815.46	816.98
SDLP	Patrick McGovern	3.77%	256	390.98		
Electorate: 8,034 Valid: 6,798 (84.62%) Spoilt: 203 Quota: 1,134 Turnout: 7,001 (87.14%)

== 1985 Election ==
1985: 2 x Sinn Féin, 1 x UUP, 1 x IIP, 1 x SDLP

Erne West - 5 seats
Party	Candidate	FPv%	Count							
Party	Candidate	FPv%	1	2	3	4	5	6	7	8
UUP	Wilson Elliott*	17.05%	1,261							
Irish Independence	Patrick McCaffrey*	15.63%	1,156	1,167	1,202	1,203	1,305			
Sinn Féin	Paul Corrigan	9.68%	716	720	868	868	881	884.68	1,511.68	
SDLP	Gerry Gallagher*	11.17%	826	937	973	977	1,123	1,167.16	1,202.16	1,216.73
Sinn Féin	Patrick McBrien	7.20%	532	536	659	660	844	867	932.92	1,193.77
UUP	Derrick Nixon	10.27%	759	759	759	1,143	1,151	1,151	1,154	1,154
Sinn Féin	Patrick Reilly	10.24%	757	758	765	765	767	767.92		
Ind. Nationalist	Patrick Flanagan*	6.29%	465	486	489	491				
DUP	Diannah Gott	5.48%	405	407	407					
Sinn Féin	Thomas Keaney	4.80%	355	356						
SDLP	Patrick McGovern	2.19%	162							
Electorate: 8,343 Valid: 7,394 (88.63%) Spoilt: 141 Quota: 1,233 Turnout: 7,535 (90.32%)
