= Enniskillen (District Electoral Area) =

District electoral area in Northern Ireland

- Fermanagh and Omagh District Council DEA constituency

Current constituency
- Created: 1985
- Seats: 7 (1985-2014); 6 (2014-)
- Councillors: Dermot Browne (SF); Roy Crawford (UUP); Aaron Elliott (DUP); Robert Irvine (UUP); Tommy Maguire (SF); Eddie Roofe (APNI)

Enniskillen DEA within Fermanagh and Omagh

Enniskillen DEA (1993–2014) within Fermanagh

Enniskillen is one of the seven district electoral areas (DEA) in Fermanagh and Omagh, Northern Ireland. The district elects six members to Fermanagh and Omagh District Council and contains the wards of Castlecoole, Erne, Lisbellaw, Lisnarrick, Portora and Rossory. Enniskillen forms part of the Fermanagh and South Tyrone constituencies for the Northern Ireland Assembly and UK Parliament.

It was created for the 1985 local elections, replacing Fermanagh Area A, Fermanagh Area B and Fermanagh Area E which had existed since 1973, where it originally contained seven wards (Castlecoole, Devenish, Erne, Island, Lisbellaw, Rossorry and Tempo). For the 2014 local elections it was reduced to six wards, losing Tempo to the Erne North DEA.

== Councillors ==
Election	Councillor (Party)	Councillor (Party)	Councillor (Party)	Councillor (Party)	Councillor (Party)	Councillor (Party)	Councillor (Party)
September 2025 Co-Option	Tommy Maguire (Sinn Féin)	Dermot Browne (Sinn Féin)	Eddie Roofe (Alliance)	Roy Crawford (UUP)	Robert Irvine (UUP)	Aaron Elliott (DUP)	6 seats 2014–present
2023	Tommy Maguire (Sinn Féin)	Dermot Browne (Sinn Féin)	Eddie Roofe (Alliance)	Roy Crawford (UUP)	Robert Irvine (UUP)	Keith Elliott (DUP)	6 seats 2014–present
September 2022 Co-Option	Tommy Maguire (Sinn Féin)	Donal O'Cofaigh (Labour Alternative)	Paul Blake (SDLP)	Roy Crawford (UUP)	Robert Irvine (UUP)	Keith Elliott (DUP)	6 seats 2014–present
2019	Tommy Maguire (Sinn Féin)	Donal O'Cofaigh (Labour Alternative)	Paul Blake (SDLP)	Howard Thornton (UUP)	Robert Irvine (UUP)	Keith Elliott (DUP)	6 seats 2014–present
March 2018 Co-Option	Tommy Maguire (Sinn Féin)	Debbie Coyle (Sinn Féin)	Paul Blake (SDLP)	Howard Thornton (UUP)	Robert Irvine (UUP)	Keith Elliott (DUP)	6 seats 2014–present
2014	Tommy Maguire (Sinn Féin)	Debbie Coyle (Sinn Féin)	Patricia Rodgers (SDLP)	Howard Thornton (UUP)	Robert Irvine (UUP)	Keith Elliott (DUP)	6 seats 2014–present
2011	Séan Lynch (Sinn Féin)	Debbie Coyle (Sinn Féin)	Frank Britton (SDLP)	Basil Johnston (UUP)	Robert Irvine (UUP)	Alison Brimstone (DUP)	Cyril Brownlee (DUP)
2005	Gerry McHugh (Sinn Féin)	Pat Cox (Sinn Féin)	Frank Britton (SDLP)	Patricia Rodgers (SDLP)	Robert Irvine (UUP)	Arlene Foster (DUP)	Joseph Dodds (DUP)
2001	Gerry McHugh (Sinn Féin)	Paddy Gilgunn (Sinn Féin)	Frank Britton (SDLP)	Davy Kettyles (Workers' Party)/ (Independent Socialist)	Robert Irvine (UUP)	Raymond Ferguson (UUP)	Joseph Dodds (DUP)
1997	Gerry McHugh (Sinn Féin)	Basil Johnston (UUP)	Eamon Flanagan (SDLP)	Davy Kettyles (Workers' Party)/ (Independent Socialist)	Sam Foster (UUP)	Raymond Ferguson (UUP)	Joseph Dodds (DUP)
1993	John McManus (Sinn Féin)	William Hetherington (UUP)	James Lunny (SDLP)	Davy Kettyles (Workers' Party)/ (Independent Socialist)	Sam Foster (UUP)	Raymond Ferguson (UUP)	Joseph Dodds (DUP)
1989	Pat Cox (Sinn Féin)	William Hetherington (UUP)	James Lunny (SDLP)	Davy Kettyles (Workers' Party)/ (Independent Socialist)	Sam Foster (UUP)	Raymond Ferguson (UUP)	Roy Coulter (DUP)
1985	Pat Cox (Sinn Féin)	William Hetherington (UUP)	James Lunny (SDLP)	Tommy Maguire (Sinn Féin)	Sam Foster (UUP)	Raymond Ferguson (UUP)	Roy Coulter (DUP)

== 2023 Election ==
2019: 2 x UUP, 1 x Sinn Féin, 1 x DUP, 1 x SDLP, 1 x Cross-Community Labour Alternative

2023: 2 x UUP, 2 x Sinn Féin, 1 x DUP, 1 x Alliance

2019–2023 Change: Sinn Féin and Alliance gain from SDLP and Cross-Community Labour Alternative

Enniskillen - 6 seats
Party	Candidate	FPv%	Count								
Party	Candidate	FPv%	1	2	3	4	5	6	7	8	9
DUP	Keith Elliott* †	13.41%	1,029	1,412							
Alliance	Eddie Roofe	10.15%	779	783	789.8	953.8	1,257.8				
Sinn Féin	Tommy Maguire*	13.34%	1,024	1,024	1,024	1,091	1,135				
UUP	Roy Crawford*	8.69%	667	674	752.2	766.2	784.2	810.12	810.12	1,130.43	
Sinn Féin	Dermot Browne	11.02%	846	846	846	879	1,003	1,057.72	1,074.21	1,077.17	1,077.17
UUP	Robert Irvine*	7.32%	562	580	673.5	684.5	701.5	720.7	721.67	995.32	1,028.47
Sinn Féin	Andrea McManus	10.16%	780	780	780	817	884	941.6	961.97	963.97	963.97
TUV	Donald Crawford	6.63%	509	531	665.3	668.3	680.3	683.18	683.18		
SDLP	Paul Blake*	7.02%	539	539	539	663					
Labour Alternative	Donal O'Cofaigh*	6.57%	504	506	507.7						
DUP	Jill Mahon	5.69%	437								
Electorate: 13,642 Valid: 7,676 (56.27%) Spoilt: 99 Quota: 1,097 Turnout: 7,775 (56.99%)

== 2019 Election ==
2014: 2 x UUP, 2 x Sinn Féin, 1 x DUP, 1 x SDLP

2019: 2 x UUP, 1 x Sinn Féin, 1 x DUP, 1 x SDLP, 1 x Cross-Community Labour Alternative

2014-2019 Change: Cross-Community Labour Alternative gain from Sinn Féin

Enniskillen - 6 seats
Party	Candidate	FPv%	Count						
Party	Candidate	FPv%	1	2	3	4	5	6	7
DUP	Keith Elliott*	16.07%	1,161						
SDLP	Paul Blake*	13.22%	955	966	967.1	1,085.1			
UUP	Robert Irvine*	10.42%	753	758	777.91	822.02	987.32	1,296.32	
UUP	Howard Thornton* †	9.01%	651	657	670.97	694.08	805.4	1,051.53	
Sinn Féin	Tommy Maguire*	13.09%	946	951	951.33	955.33	955.33	957.33	958.33
Labour Alternative	Donal O'Cofaigh	9.97%	720	756	756.88	872.99	879.65	897.76	949.76
Sinn Féin	Debbie Coyle*	10.53%	761	778	778.44	789.44	789.77	793.88	797.88
TUV	Donald Crawford	6.81%	492	493	504.33	510.44	638.63		
DUP	Simon Wiggins	4.71%	340	344	422.32	427.43			
Alliance	Matthew Beaumont	4.29%	310	353	353.66				
Green (NI)	Debbie Coleman	1.88%	136						
Electorate: 13,048 Valid: 7,225 (55.37%) Spoilt: 87 Quota: 1,033 Turnout: 7,312 (56.04%)

== 2014 Election ==
2011: 2 x UUP, 2 x Sinn Féin, 2 x DUP, 1 x SDLP

2014: 2 x UUP, 2 x Sinn Féin, 1 x DUP, 1 x SDLP

2011-2014 Change: DUP loss due to the reduction of one seat

Enniskillen - 6 seats
Party	Candidate	FPv%	Count							
Party	Candidate	FPv%	1	2	3	4	5	6	7	8
UUP	Robert Irvine*	11.55%	778	792	982					
DUP	Keith Elliott	11.55%	778	779	794	796	1,225			
SDLP	Patricia Rodgers †	9.51%	641	710	717	803	809	814.11	1,019.11	
Sinn Féin	Tommy Maguire*	11.76%	792	801	801	868	869	869.73	963.73	
Sinn Féin	Debbie Coyle*	9.95%	670	676	676	767	767	767.73	875.73	919.89
UUP	Howard Thornton	8.10%	546	555	635	638	666	819.3	855.76	872.66
TUV	Donald Crawford	9.44%	636	640	647	648	688	779.98	797.71	802.54
Independent	Donal O'Cofaigh	8.24%	555	610	613	655	660	668.76		
DUP	Shirley Donaldson	7.47%	503	506	516	520				
Independent	Pat Cox	4.65%	313	320	322					
UUP	Basil Johnston*	4.54%	306	319						
Alliance	Ann Gormley	2.20%	148							
Green (NI)	Laurence Speight	1.05%	71							
Electorate: 12,561 Valid: 6,737 (53.63%) Spoilt: 75 Quota: 963 Turnout: 6,812 (54.23%)

== 2011 Election ==
2005: 2 x Sinn Féin, 2 x DUP, 2 x SDLP, 1 x UUP

2011: 2 x UUP, 2 x Sinn Féin, 2 x DUP, 1 x SDLP

2005-2011 Change: UUP gain from SDLP

Enniskillen - 7 seats
Party	Candidate	FPv%	Count								
Party	Candidate	FPv%	1	2	3	4	5	6	7	8	9
UUP	Robert Irvine*	13.46%	1,104								
DUP	Alison Brimstone	12.32%	1,011	1,015.34	1,026.34						
Sinn Féin	Seán Lynch	11.93%	979	979.07	992.07	1,023.07	1,147.07				
Sinn Féin	Debbie Coyle	8.42%	691	691	696	726	961	1,071			
UUP	Basil Johnston	6.39%	524	581.75	597.82	605.82	605.82	605.82	605.82	1,019.5	1,025.64
DUP	Cyril Brownlee	10.32%	847	849.38	851.52	858.52	859.52	859.52	859.52	922.85	928.85
SDLP	Frank Britton*	8.34%	684	684.28	724.28	766.28	772.28	776.28	786.28	796.42	903.42
SDLP	Patricia Rodgers*	6.75%	554	554.14	603.21	661.21	667.21	670.21	685.21	693.35	902.35
Independent	Pat Cox*	5.56%	456	456.13	470.14	513.14	526.14	529.14	545.14	546.14	
UUP	Howard Thornton	6.03%	495	505.85	515.99	520.99	520.99	520.99	521.99		
Sinn Féin	Ciaran May	4.57%	375	375	383	398					
Socialist Party	Donal O'Cofaigh	3.02%	248	248	280						
Alliance	Kevin Chaffey	1.45%	119	119.49							
Green (NI)	Laurence Speight	0.77%	63	63.07							
Independent	Fidelma Leonard	0.66%	54	54.07							
Electorate: 13,409 Valid: 8,204 (61.18%) Spoilt: 167 Quota: 1,026 Turnout: 8,371 (62.32%)

== 2005 Election ==
2001: 2 x Sinn Féin, 2 x UUP, 1 x SDLP, 1 x DUP, 1 x Independent

2005: 2 x Sinn Féin, 2 x DUP, 2 x SDLP, 1 x UUP

2001-2005 Change: DUP and SDLP gain from UUP and Independent

Enniskillen - 7 seats
Party	Candidate	FPv%	Count						
Party	Candidate	FPv%	1	2	3	4	5	6	7
DUP	Arlene Foster	23.57%	2,054						
DUP	Joseph Dodds*	4.59%	400	1,132.73					
UUP	Robert Irvine*	6.61%	576	660.6	694.48	1,097.48			
Sinn Féin	Gerry McHugh*	9.62%	838	838.47	855.47	855.47	855.5	1,308.5	
Sinn Féin	Pat Cox*	11.06%	964	964.47	1,011.47	1,012.47	1,012.47	1,195.47	
SDLP	Frank Britton*	10.51%	916	918.35	1,046.35	1,058.58	1,060.23	1,094.23	
SDLP	Patricia Rodgers	7.66%	668	670.35	742.35	751.52	752.96	772.96	973.96
UUP	Raymond Ferguson*	7.83%	682	742.63	770.57	912.35	942.26	943.73	950.73
Sinn Féin	Paddy Gilgunn*	7.85%	684	684.94	717.41	718.41	718.41		
UUP	Basil Johnston	6.05%	527	586.69	601.16				
Socialist Party	Paul Dale	4.66%	406	412.11					
Electorate: 13,101 Valid: 8,715 (66.52%) Spoilt: 163 Quota: 1,090 Turnout: 8,878 (67.77%)

== 2001 Election ==
1997: 3 x UUP, 1 x Sinn Féin, 1 x SDLP, 1 x DUP, 1 x Independent Socialist

2001: 2 x UUP, 2 x Sinn Féin, 1 x SDLP, 1 x DUP, 1 x Independent

1997-2001 Change: Sinn Féin gain from UUP, Independent Socialist becomes Independent

Enniskillen - 7 seats
Party	Candidate	FPv%	Count							
Party	Candidate	FPv%	1	2	3	4	5	6	7	8
UUP	Raymond Ferguson*	15.58%	1,486							
Sinn Féin	Gerry McHugh*	14.04%	1,339							
Sinn Féin	Paddy Gilgunn	11.22%	1,070							
DUP	Joseph Dodds*	11.49%	1,096	1,105.2	1,105.31	1,290.31				
SDLP	Frank Britton	9.79%	934	935.8	940.86	940.97	950.28	1,513.28		
Independent	Davy Kettyles*	9.03%	861	871.2	876.59	882.79	902.99	1,027.01	1,312.31	
UUP	Robert Irvine	7.43%	709	958.4	858.73	902.33	1,104.53	1,113.53	1,133.23	1,174.73
UUP	Basil Johnston*	6.17%	589	547.2	647.31	671.71	898.91	904.31	917.81	947.51
SDLP	Eamon Flanagan*	8.03%	766	769.6	775.98	777.18	780.98			
UUP	Barbara Stewart	4.22%	403	458	458.44	478.44				
UK Unionist	Alan Madill	1.91%	182	184	184					
DUP	Samuel Dunne	1.10%	105	107.8	108.02					
Electorate: 13,226 Valid: 9,540 (72.13%) Spoilt: 184 Quota: 1,193 Turnout: 9,724 (73.52%)

== 1997 Election ==
1993: 3 x UUP, 1 x Sinn Féin, 1 x SDLP, 1 x DUP, 1 x Independent Socialist

1997: 3 x UUP, 1 x Sinn Féin, 1 x SDLP, 1 x DUP, 1 x Independent Socialist

1993-1997 Change: No change

Enniskillen - 7 seats
Party	Candidate	FPv%	Count							
Party	Candidate	FPv%	1	2	3	4	5	6	7	8
UUP	Samuel Foster*	26.31%	2,055							
Sinn Féin	Gerry McHugh*	16.81%	1,313							
UUP	Raymond Ferguson*	9.84%	769	1,325.4						
UUP	Basil Johnston	8.77%	685	866.48	982.64					
SDLP	Eamon Flanagan*	11.87%	927	928.56	930.16	1,030.48				
Ind. Socialist	Davy Kettyles*	7.44%	581	588.8	594.24	672.78	679.81	732.88	811.38	1,002.38
DUP	Joseph Dodds*	7.44%	581	664.72	700.24	700.24	700.24	702.24	829.64	833.53
UUP	Ethel Gregg	2.24%	175	379.88	546.92	546.92	547.11	596.71	643.79	660.02
SDLP	John Rooney	3.42%	267	267.52	267.84	381.69	420.64	438.34	514.05	
NI Women's Coalition	Margaret McCaffrey	1.83%	143	144.04	144.36	180	183.99	215.99		
DUP	Robert Irvine	2.05%	160	175.6	186.48	186.48	186.48	187.48		
Alliance	John Haslett	2.00%	156	164.32	166.88	170.18	170.94			
Electorate: 12,960 Valid: 7,812 (60.28%) Spoilt: 117 Quota: 977 Turnout: 7,929 (61.18%)

== 1993 Election ==
1989: 3 x UUP, 1 x SDLP, 1 x Sinn Féin, 1 x DUP, 1 x Workers' Party

1993: 3 x UUP, 1 x SDLP, 1 x Sinn Féin, 1 x DUP, 1 x Independent Socialist

1989-1993 Change: Independent Socialist leaves Workers' Party

Enniskillen - 7 seats
Party	Candidate	FPv%	Count						
Party	Candidate	FPv%	1	2	3	4	5	6	7
UUP	Samuel Foster*	20.12%	1,605						
UUP	Raymond Ferguson*	14.53%	1,159						
SDLP	James Lunny*	8.74%	697	699.66	702.88	703.02	1,247.02		
Ind. Socialist	Davy Kettyles*	11.95%	953	965.16	971.74	980.54	1,041.54		
Sinn Féin	John McManus	12.26%	978	978	978.14	978.14	1,007.14		
UUP	William Hetherington*	9.23%	736	920.68	949.52	984.06	985.2	1,006.2	
DUP	Joseph Dodds	6.05%	483	527.84	533.86	875.44	875.58	876.58	877.58
UUP	Ethel Gregg	3.75%	299	619.72	728.08	757.66	761.8	817.8	823.8
SDLP	James Donnelly	8.51%	679	679.38	680.08	682.08			
DUP	Frederick Black	4.86%	388	422.58	427.34				
Electorate: 12,304 Valid: 7,977 (64.83%) Spoilt: 131 Quota: 998 Turnout: 8,108 (65.90%)

== 1989 Election ==
1985: 3 x UUP, 2 x Sinn Féin, 1 x SDLP, 1 x DUP

1989: 3 x UUP, 1 x Sinn Féin, 1 x SDLP, 1 x DUP, 1 x Workers' Party

1985-1989 Change: Workers' Party gain from Sinn Féin

Enniskillen - 7 seats
Party	Candidate	FPv%	Count									
Party	Candidate	FPv%	1	2	3	4	5	6	7	8	9	10
UUP	Raymond Ferguson*	17.97%	1,639									
UUP	Samuel Foster*	16.28%	1,485									
Workers' Party	Davy Kettyles	12.61%	1,150									
UUP	William Hetherington*	8.60%	784	1,058.04	1,202.25							
SDLP	James Lunny*	7.40%	675	679.34	681.64	686.64	686.87	787.27	787.47	1,268.47		
Sinn Féin	Pat Cox*	7.19%	656	656.31	656.31	658.31	660.31	663.31	663.31	685.31	762.73	1,361.73
DUP	Roy Coulter*	8.81%	803	830.9	868.16	869.16	1,011.01	1,024.56	1,030.06	1,031.68	1,035.6	1,039.56
UUP	Bertie Kerr	2.72%	248	410.13	546.98	547.98	569.21	668.34	722.84	730.07	749.67	755.57
Sinn Féin	John McManus	7.01%	639	639	639	645	645	646.31	646.31	655.31	682.75	
SDLP	James Donnelly	6.09%	555	556.24	556.47	559.47	559.47	596.78	596.78			
Alliance	William Barbour	3.34%	305	322.36	326.04	327.04	329.12					
DUP	John Connor	1.70%	155	161.82	174.01	176.01						
Independent	John Bothwell	0.27%	25	25.62	25.62							
Electorate: 12,402 Valid: 9,119 (73.53%) Spoilt: 222 Quota: 1,140 Turnout: 9,341 (75.32%)

== 1985 Election ==
1985: 3 x UUP, 2 x Sinn Féin, 1 x DUP, 1 x SDLP

Enniskillen - 7 seats
Party	Candidate	FPv%	Count													
Party	Candidate	FPv%	1	2	3	4	5	6	7	8	9	10	11	12	13	14
UUP	Raymond Ferguson*	12.67%	1,169													
UUP	Samuel Foster*	11.72%	1,082	1,082	1,082	1,082	1,082	1,143	1,149.51	1,153.52	1,416.52					
Sinn Féin	Pat Cox	9.59%	885	900	915	936	1,096	1,099	1,099	1,107	1,108	1,108	1,159			
DUP	Roy Coulter*	9.73%	898	898	898	898	899	909	909.26	910.26	973.56	989.56	991.57	1,512.57		
UUP	William Hetherington*	7.56%	698	700	700	702	702	720	720.95	722.95	863.72	1,076.72	1,088.75	1,205.75		
SDLP	James Lunny*	3.88%	358	359	379	468	504	531	531.02	733.02	734.02	736.02	907.02	908.16	928.16	934.16
Sinn Féin	Tommy Maguire	8.32%	768	776	804	808	842	842	842	845	845	845	923	923	924	924
SDLP	James Donnelly	4.45%	411	413	419	468	507	537	537	768	771	774	867.02	868.09	891.09	899.09
DUP	Ivan Foster	6.63%	612	612	612	612	612	622	623.08	623.08	657.44	663.44	668.45			
Workers' Party	Davy Kettyles	4.39%	405	429	446	448	467	538	538.1	578.12	581.12	584.12				
UUP	Norman Brown*	4.79%	442	443	443	443	443	522	524.63	525.63						
SDLP	Eileen Flanagan	3.92%	362	363	369	445	471	510	516.04							
Alliance	William Barbour	3.95%	365	370	371	372	376									
Irish Independence	Anthony Cox*	2.54%	234	237	340	357										
SDLP	Seamus Rogers	2.88%	266	266	266											
Irish Independence	Patrick O'Reilly*	2.17%	200	204												
Independent	Floyd Maguire	0.80%	74													
Electorate: 11,942 Valid: 9,229 (77.28%) Spoilt: 130 Quota: 1,154 Turnout: 9,359 (78.37%)
