= 1973 Northern Ireland local elections =

UK elections

- 30 May 1973

All 526 seats to 26 local authorities
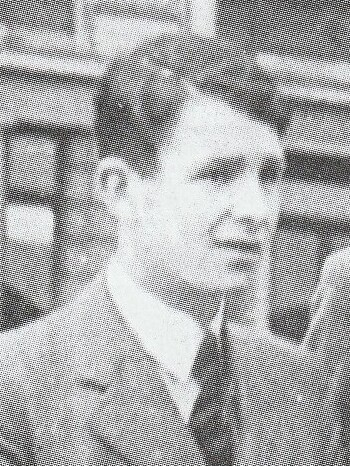

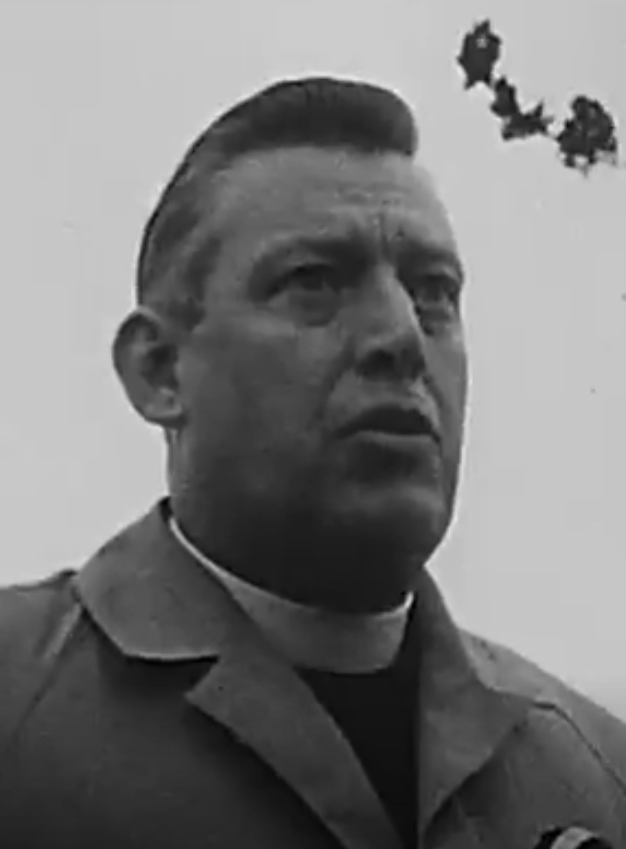
	First party	Second party
		SDLP
Leader	Brian Faulkner	Gerry Fitt
Party	UUP	SDLP
Seats won	216	82
Popular vote	278,084	92,600
Percentage	40.2%	13.4%
	Third party	Fourth party
	APNI
Leader	Oliver Napier	Ian Paisley
Party	Alliance	DUP
Seats won	63	21
Popular vote	94,474	27,578
Percentage	13.7%	4.0%
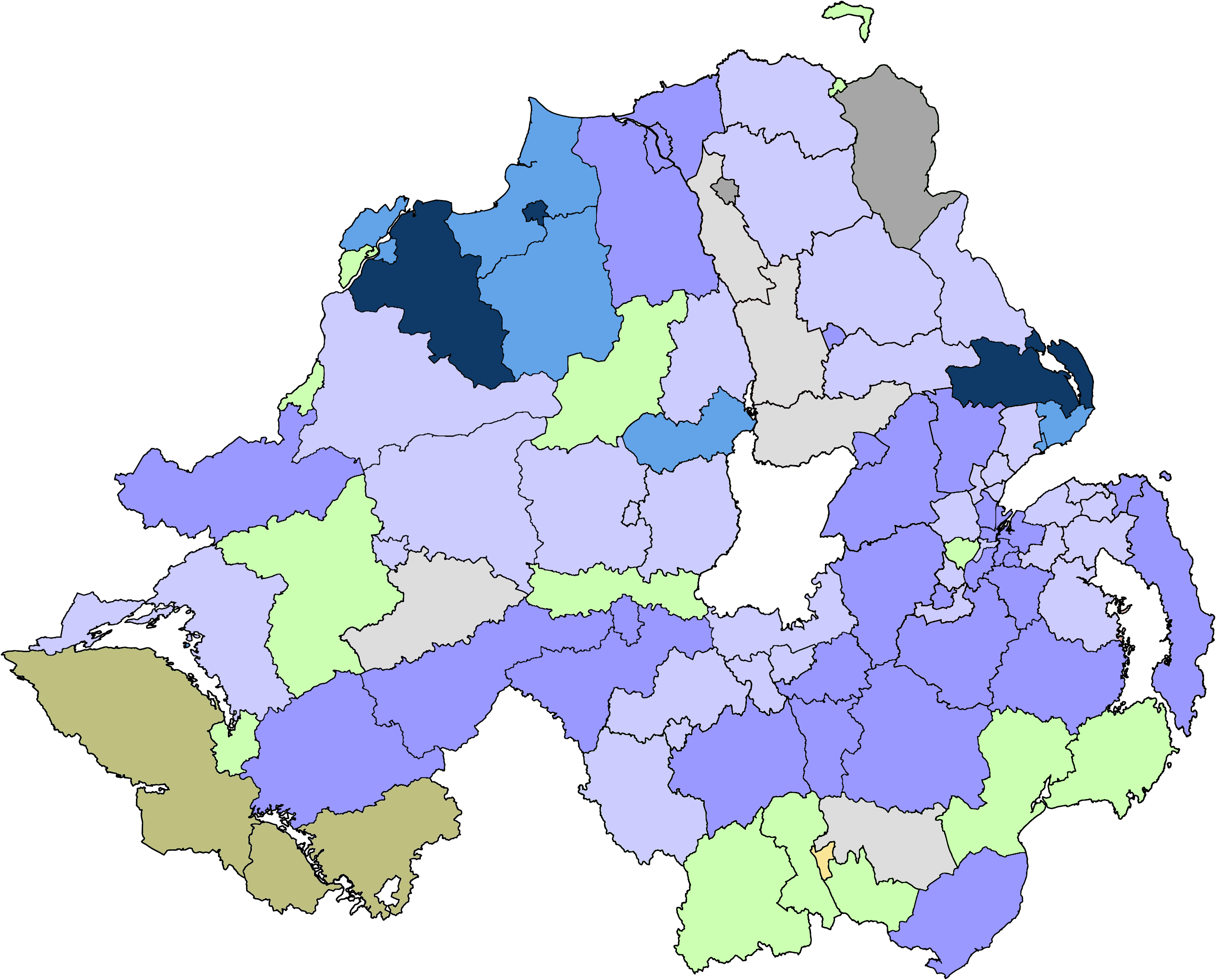

Local government in Northern Ireland was reorganised in 1973 by the Local Government (Boundaries) Act (Northern Ireland) 1971 and the Local Government Act (Northern Ireland) 1972. The county councils, county borough and municipal borough corporations and urban and rural district councils were replaced by twenty-six local government districts.

Elections took place for all the seats on the district councils on 30 May 1973. Elections were by proportional representation, using the single transferable vote system. The district councils came into their powers on 1 October.

== Results ==
=== Overall ===
Party	Councillors		Votes		Notes
Party	Total	+/-	% share	Total	Notes
UUP	216	N/A	40.2	278,084	(Note: Includes candidates labelled "Official Unionist" and "Unionist".)
Alliance	63	N/A	13.7	92,600	
SDLP	82	N/A	13.4	94,474	
Loyalist coalitions	53	N/A	9.6	66,027	(Note: Includes candidates labelled "United Loyalist", "Loyalist", "Loyalist Coalition", "United Loyalist Coalition", "Unionist Unity", "United Unionist" and "Unionist Coalition". Usually endorsed by Vanguard, the DUP, or both, depending on area.)
Independent	55	N/A	7.8	53,448	(Note: Includes candidates labelled "Non Party", "Non Party Community", "Independent Ratepayer", "Non Party Independent Radical", "Non Party Tenants and Community Association", "Non Party Abolish 11 Plus", "Non Party Sports and Development Council", and "Independent Labour".)
DUP	21	N/A	4.0	27,578	(Note: Includes candidates labelled as "Loyalist and Democratic Unionist".)
Republican Clubs	11	N/A	3.3	22,591	(Note: Includes candidates nominated as "Republican" and "Official Republican". Contemporary sources indicate both labels refer to Republican Clubs candidates.)
NI Labour	4	N/A	2.5	17,274	
Vanguard	6	N/A	1.5	10,639	(Note: Includes candidates labelled as "Vanguard Loyalist", with the exception of one candidate in Down, for whom the Belfast Telegraph deemed it erroneous to describe as VUPP.)
Unity	6	N/A	1.5	10,281	
Ind. Unionist	5	N/A	1.4	9,993	(Note: Includes candidates labelled "Independent Unionist", "Independent United Loyalist" and a single "Vanguard Loyalist" in Down (a contemporary report from the Belfast Telegraph suggests it is erroneous to refer to this candidate as a VUPP candidate).)
Nationalist	4	N/A	0.5	3,784	
Republican Labour	0	N/A	0.4	2,594	
Ulster Liberal	0	N/A	0.1	704	
Ind. Nationalist	0	N/A	0.1	599	
Communist	0	N/A	0.1	363	
Irish Labour	0	N/A	0.0	290	
Total	526	Steady	100.0%	691,323	

On 21 March 1973, Ian Paisley, William Craig and Laurence Orr announced the creation of a united front to oppose the White Paper, a British government document that had proposed a power-sharing administration and a Council of Ireland to replace the Parliament of Northern Ireland.

Craig and Paisley had initially announced that their parties would not be contesting the local elections - but in practice, candidates from their parties did run, under their own party banners, but in many cases they opted to run under various 'loyalist' labels instead alongside anti-White Paper UUP members, non-party unionists, and localist unionists. The 'loyalist' labels included 'Loyalist', 'United Loyalist', 'Loyalist Coalition', 'Unionist Unity', 'United Unionist' and 'United Loyalist Coalition'.

Depending on the area, the candidates under the various 'loyalist' labels were supported by a coalition of some or all of Vanguard, the DUP, anti-White Paper UUP members, the Loyalist Association of Workers, the Orange Order, the Ulster Defence Association, the Loyalist Defence Volunteers, the Ulster Special Constabulary Association, and the Ulster Protestant Volunteers. In some cases, candidates under the DUP and Vanguard banners were running in the same areas as candidates under the various 'loyalist' labels.

In this election, many UUP candidates used the label "Unionist", while others used the label "Official Unionist". Candidates under both labels were identified as being UUP candidates by contemporary sources, with the difference in some places signifying whether the candidate supported the "official" party line on the White Paper.

=== Party seats by council ===
Council	UUP(U)	SDLP (N)	AP (O)	LOY (U)	DUP (U)	RC (N)	NILP (O)	VUPP (U)	Unity (N)	Nat (N)	Ind	Ind (U)	Total	U	N	O	Largest bloc	Largest party
Antrim	9		2		1			1			2		15	11	0	4	Unionist majority	UUP majority
Belfast City	25	7	8	3	2	2	2					2	51	32	9	10	Unionist majority	UUP plurality
Ards	11	1	2	1			1				1		17	12	1	4	Unionist majority	UUP majority
Armagh	11	4	1		2	1					1		20	13	5	2	Unionist majority	UUP majority
Ballymena	9		1		5			1			5		21	15	0	6	Unionist majority	UUP plurality
Ballymoney	6	2	1		1						6		16	7	2	7	Unionist/Other plurality	UUP/Ind plurality
Banbridge	12	1									3		16	12	1	3	Unionist majority	UUP majority
Carrickfergus	5		3	6							1		15	11	0	4	Unionist majority	Loyalist plurality
Castlereagh	10		5	3							1		19	13	0	6	Unionist majority	UUP majority
Coleraine	13	1	3								2	1	20	14	1	5	Unionist majority	UUP majority
Cookstown	8	3		1		1					2		15	9	4	2	Unionist majority	UUP majority
Craigavon	10	2	4	3	3			2			1		25	18	2	5	Unionist majority	UUP plurality
Down	8	8	2								1	1	20	9	8	3	Unionist plurality	UUP/SDLP plurality
Dungannon	11	5				2			2				20	11	9	0	Unionist majority	UUP majority
Fermanagh	8	4		1					4		2	1	20	10	8	2	Unionist plurality	UUP majority
Larne	1		3	8							3		15	9	0	6	Unionist majority	Loyalist majority
Limavady		4	2	8							1		15	8	4	3	Unionist majority	Loyalist majority
Lisburn	14	1	3		4			1					23	19	1	3	Unionist majority	UUP majority
Londonderry		10	4	9		1				3			27	9	14	4	Nationalist majority	SDLP plurality
Magherafelt	5	6		1		1		1			1		15	6	7	1	Nationalist plurality	SDLP plurality
Moyle	5	2									9		16	5	2	9	Other majority	Ind majority
Newry and Mourne	3	13	4			2					8		30	3	15	12	Nationalist plurality	SDLP plurality
Newtownabbey	12		3	2	3		1						21	17	0	4	Unionist majority	UUP majority
North Down	9		7	4									20	13	0	7	Unionist majority	UUP plurality
Omagh	6	4	3	2		1				1	3		20	8	6	6	Unionist plurality	UUP plurality
Strabane	6	4	2	1							2		15	7	4	4	Unionist plurality	UUP plurality
Total	217	82	63	53	21	11	4	6	6	4	55	5	527	301	103	122	Unionist majority of council seats	UUP plurality of council seats

=== Votes by council ===
Council	UUP(U)	SDLP (N)	AP (O)	LOY (U)	DUP (U)	RC (N)	NILP (O)	VUPP (U)	Unity (N)	Nat (N)	Rep Lab (N)	CPI (O)	Liberal (O)	Irish Labour (O)	Ind	Ind (U)	Ind (N)	Total
Antrim	7,038	343	2,291		748		287	866							2,663			14,236
Belfast City	83,658	18,827	22,081	11,097	3,860	6,584	9,046				2,594	211	172		878	5,964		164,972
Ards	11,499	1,180	3,133	1,608			1,114	1,510					167		895			21,106
Armagh	10,405	5,200	1,785		2,601	1,070	583		153						1,130			22,927
Ballymena	8,688		1,469		5,607		438	1,276							5,466			22,944
Ballymoney	3,775	824	679		687										2,850			8,815
Banbridge	9,622	1,183	850				170								2,972			14,797
Carrickfergus	3,440		2,716	4,402			472								1,129			12,159
Castlereagh	14,282		6,248	5,215			1,564	344							904			28,557
Coleraine	12,451	1,483	2,869	325		659	200								2,677	1,121		21,785
Cookstown	6,428	2,671	925	1,652		1,741									1,276			14,693
Craigavon	11,589	2,092	5,014	3,096	2,940	1,879	363	3,246							1,205			31,424
Down	8,930	8,101	2,847			563									1,639	1,046		23,126
Dungannon	11,422	4,913	1,348			1,350	225		2,297						1,047	162		22,764
Fermanagh	8,412	3,540	2,285	2,008	1,495				7,212						3,406	1,496		29,854
Larne	1,036	543	3,411	6,411			182								1,814			13,397
Limavady		3,485	1,305	5,535		483									810			11,618
Lisburn	15,979	1,721	5,916		5,482		749	2,166							445	204		32,662
Londonderry		11,008	4,930	12,483		2,091	88			2,850					425		71	33,946
Magherafelt	4,978	5,520	788	1,749		1,562		1,083	377						1,074			17,131
Moyle	1,814	799	334										77		3,644			6,668
Newry and Mourne	3,757	10,291	3,939			3,160							288	290	7,054		381	29,160
Newtownabbey	14,070	508	5,565	2,252	4,158		1,793								1,090			29,436
North Down	12,292		7,691	4,638				148							1,282			26,051
Omagh	5,399	3,279	2,298	2,508		740			242	934					3,250		147	18,797
Strabane	7,120	5,089	1,757	1,048		709									2,575			18,298
Total	278,084	92,600	94,474	66,027	27,578	22,591	17,274	10,639	10,281	3,784	2,594	211	704	290	53,600	9,993	599	691,323
