= 1985 Fermanagh District Council election =

Local government election in Northern Ireland

← 1981	15 May 1985	1989 →

All 23 seats to Fermanagh District Council 12 seats needed for a majority
	First party	Second party	Third party
Party	UUP	Sinn Féin	SDLP
Seats won	8	8	4
Seat change	0	▲8	0
	Fourth party	Fifth party	Sixth party
Party	DUP	Irish Independence	Ind. Nationalist
Seats won	2	1	0
Seat change	0	▼3	▼1
	Seventh party
Party	Ind. Republican
Seats won	0
Seat change	▼1

Elections to Fermanagh District Council were held on 15 May 1985 on the same day as the other Northern Irish local government elections. The election used four district electoral areas to elect a total of 23 councillors.

== Election results ==
Fermanagh District Council Election Result 1985
Party	Seats	Gains	Losses	Net gain/loss	Seats %	Votes %	Votes	+/−
UUP	8	0	0	0	34.8	33.0	10,294	▼1.0
Sinn Féin	8	8	0	0	17.4	25.2	7,855	New
SDLP	4	0	0	0	21.7	16.8	5,263	▼1.0
DUP	2	0	0	0	8.7	13.0	4,069	▲0.7
Irish Independence	1	0	3	▼3	4.3	6.8	2,130	▼15.5
Alliance	0	0	0	0	0.0	1.8	552	▲0.2
Ind. Nationalist	0	0	1	▼1	0.0	1.5	465	▼4.0
Workers' Party	0	0	0	0	0.0	1.3	405	New
Independent Socialist	0	0	0	0	0.0	0.4	113	▲0.4
Independent	0	0	0	0	0.0	0.2	74	▼1.5

Note: "Votes" are the first preference votes.

== Districts summary ==
Results of the Fermanagh District Council election, 1985 by district
Ward	%	Cllrs	%	Cllrs	%	Cllrs	%	Cllrs	%	Cllrs	%	Cllrs	Total Cllrs
Ward	UUP		Sinn Féin		SDLP		DUP		IIP		Others		Total Cllrs
Enniskillen	36.7	3	17.9	2	15.1	1	16.4	1	4.7	0	9.2	0	7
Erne East	31.6	2	37.4	3	17.3	1	9.4	0	2.9	0	1.4	0	6
Erne North	35.9	2	11.9	1	22.9	1	21.7	1	4.7	0	2.9	0	5
Erne West	27.3	1	31.9	2	13.4	1	5.5	0	15.6	1	6.3	0	5
Total	33.0	8	25.2	8	16.8	4	13.0	2	6.8	1	5.2	0	23

== District results ==
=== Enniskillen ===
1985: 3 x UUP, 2 x Sinn Féin, 1 x DUP, 1 x SDLP

Enniskillen - 7 seats
Party	Candidate	FPv%	Count													
Party	Candidate	FPv%	1	2	3	4	5	6	7	8	9	10	11	12	13	14
UUP	Raymond Ferguson*	12.67%	1,169													
UUP	Samuel Foster*	11.72%	1,082	1,082	1,082	1,082	1,082	1,143	1,149.51	1,153.52	1,416.52					
Sinn Féin	Pat Cox	9.59%	885	900	915	936	1,096	1,099	1,099	1,107	1,108	1,108	1,159			
DUP	Roy Coulter*	9.73%	898	898	898	898	899	909	909.26	910.26	973.56	989.56	991.57	1,512.57		
UUP	William Hetherington*	7.56%	698	700	700	702	702	720	720.95	722.95	863.72	1,076.72	1,088.75	1,205.75		
SDLP	James Lunny*	3.88%	358	359	379	468	504	531	531.02	733.02	734.02	736.02	907.02	908.16	928.16	934.16
Sinn Féin	Tommy Maguire	8.32%	768	776	804	808	842	842	842	845	845	845	923	923	924	924
SDLP	James Donnelly	4.45%	411	413	419	468	507	537	537	768	771	774	867.02	868.09	891.09	899.09
DUP	Ivan Foster	6.63%	612	612	612	612	612	622	623.08	623.08	657.44	663.44	668.45			
Workers' Party	Davy Kettyles	4.39%	405	429	446	448	467	538	538.1	578.12	581.12	584.12				
UUP	Norman Brown*	4.79%	442	443	443	443	443	522	524.63	525.63						
SDLP	Eileen Flanagan	3.92%	362	363	369	445	471	510	516.04							
Alliance	William Barbour	3.95%	365	370	371	372	376									
Irish Independence	Anthony Cox*	2.54%	234	237	340	357										
SDLP	Seamus Rogers	2.88%	266	266	266											
Irish Independence	Patrick O'Reilly*	2.17%	200	204												
Independent	Floyd Maguire	0.80%	74													
Electorate: 11,942 Valid: 9,229 (77.28%) Spoilt: 130 Quota: 1,154 Turnout: 9,359 (78.37%)

=== Erne East ===
1985: 3 x Sinn Féin, 2 x UUP, 1 x SDLP

Erne East - 6 seats
Party	Candidate	FPv%	Count											
Party	Candidate	FPv%	1	2	3	4	5	6	7	8	9	10	11	12
UUP	Cecil Noble*	15.51%	1,279											
SDLP	Fergus McQuillan*	8.11%	669	669.14	682.14	683.14	733.14	885.14	1,374.14					
UUP	Albert Liddle	8.24%	680	732.57	733.64	744.06	744.06	746.06	747.06	748.06	1,374.06			
Sinn Féin	Plunket O'Neill	12.11%	999	999	1,014	1,014	1,060	1,070	1,079	1,103	1,106	1,106.37	1,554.37	
Sinn Féin	Thomas Murray	9.02%	744	744	745	745	760	760	817	887	888	888.37	1,013.74	1,168.54
Sinn Féin	Vincent McCaffrey	8.23%	679	679	683	683	721	725	765	810	813	813.74	832.88	1,151.58
DUP	William Mitchell	7.04%	581	588.21	588.21	756.42	756.42	756.42	756.42	758.42	808.57	1,000.6	1,001.97	1,001.97
Sinn Féin	John McCusker*	8.05%	664	664.14	671.14	671.14	697.14	703.14	717.14	755.14	756.14	757.25		
UUP	Thomas Johnston	7.82%	645	672.51	673.58	689.07	689.07	691.07	696.07	705.07				
SDLP	James Goodwin	5.97%	492	492	503	504	519	651						
SDLP	John Reihill	3.20%	264	264.07	294.07	294.07	329.07							
Irish Independence	John McMahon*	2.92%	241	241	264	264								
DUP	Caroline Madill	2.40%	198	199.12	199.12									
Independent Socialist	Seamus Mullan	1.37%	113	113.14										
Electorate: 9,572 Valid: 8,248 (86.17%) Spoilt: 130 Quota: 1,179 Turnout: 8,378 (87.53%)

=== Erne North ===
1985: 2 x UUP, 1 x SDLP, 1 x DUP, 1 x Sinn Féin

Erne North - 5 seats
Party	Candidate	FPv%	Count						
Party	Candidate	FPv%	1	2	3	4	5	6	7
UUP	Caldwell McClaughry*	20.33%	1,291						
DUP	Bert Johnston*	17.14%	1,088						
UUP	Simon Loane	15.56%	988	1,198.78					
Sinn Féin	Stephen Maguire	11.91%	756	756	756.26	758.26	897.26	947.39	947.65
SDLP	John O'Kane*	10.32%	655	655.54	656.19	707.02	720.02	906.46	937.39
SDLP	Tommy Gallagher	6.44%	409	409	409.13	426.7	550.7	703.88	729.14
DUP	Victor Milligan	4.52%	287	301.4	418.66	474.64	475.64	479.21	
SDLP	Dodie Maguire	6.13%	389	389.72	390.5	416.25	436.25		
Irish Independence	Patrick Keown	4.71%	299	299.18	299.31	306.31			
Alliance	John Haslett	2.95%	187	191.32	211.86				
Electorate: 7,711 Valid: 6,349 (82.34%) Spoilt: 67 Quota: 1,059 Turnout: 6,416 (83.21%)

=== Erne West ===
1985: 2 x Sinn Féin, 1 x UUP, 1 x IIP, 1 x SDLP

Erne West - 5 seats
Party	Candidate	FPv%	Count							
Party	Candidate	FPv%	1	2	3	4	5	6	7	8
UUP	Wilson Elliott*	17.05%	1,261							
Irish Independence	Patrick McCaffrey*	15.63%	1,156	1,167	1,202	1,203	1,305			
Sinn Féin	Paul Corrigan	9.68%	716	720	868	868	881	884.68	1,511.68	
SDLP	Gerry Gallagher*	11.17%	826	937	973	977	1,123	1,167.16	1,202.16	1,216.73
Sinn Féin	Patrick McBrien	7.20%	532	536	659	660	844	867	932.92	1,193.77
UUP	Derrick Nixon	10.27%	759	759	759	1,143	1,151	1,151	1,154	1,154
Sinn Féin	Patrick Reilly	10.24%	757	758	765	765	767	767.92		
Ind. Nationalist	Patrick Flanagan*	6.29%	465	486	489	491				
DUP	Diannah Gott	5.48%	405	407	407					
Sinn Féin	Thomas Keaney	4.80%	355	356						
SDLP	Patrick McGovern	2.19%	162							
Electorate: 8,343 Valid: 7,394 (88.63%) Spoilt: 141 Quota: 1,233 Turnout: 7,535 (90.32%)
