= Tom Daly (Irish politician) =

Nothern Irish politician

Thomas Daly (born June 1938), known as Tom Daly, was an Irish nationalist politician.

Born in Belleek, County Fermanagh, Daly studied at St Columb's College before becoming a pub landlord. He joined the Nationalist Party, and was elected to Fermanagh County Council in 1968, serving until its abolition in 1972. The following year, he was a founder member of the Fermanagh branch of the Social Democratic and Labour Party (SDLP), and was elected under this new label to the Northern Ireland Assembly, 1973, in which he represented Fermanagh and South Tyrone. He was also elected to the new Fermanagh District Council, serving as its first vice-chairman.

Daly held his Fermanagh and South Tyrone seat on the 1975 Northern Ireland Constitutional Convention, and also held his council seat at the 1977 Northern Ireland local elections, but did not stand at the following elections, in 1981, following personal difficulties.

Daly's brother was Edward Daly, who became Bishop of Derry.

Northern Ireland Assembly (1973)
New assembly	Assembly Member for Fermanagh & South Tyrone; 1973–1974	Assembly abolished
Northern Ireland Constitutional Convention
New convention	Member for Fermanagh & South Tyrone; 1975–1976	Convention dissolved
