= Sam Foster (politician) =

Northern Irish politician (1931–2014)

Sam Foster CBE

Minister of the Environment
- In office 29 November 1999 – 20 February 2002
- Preceded by: New office
- Succeeded by: Dermot Nesbitt

Member of the Legislative Assembly for Fermanagh & South Tyrone
- In office 25 June 1998 – 26 November 2003
- Preceded by: Constituency created
- Succeeded by: Tom Elliott

Member of Fermanagh District Council
- In office 15 May 1985 – 7 June 2001
- Preceded by: New district
- Succeeded by: Robert Irvine
- Constituency: Enniskillen
- In office 20 May 1981 – 15 May 1985
- Preceded by: Thomas Scott
- Succeeded by: District abolished
- Constituency: Fermanagh Area E

Northern Ireland Forum Member for Fermanagh and South Tyrone
- In office 30 May 1996 – 25 April 1998
- Preceded by: New forum
- Succeeded by: Forum dissolved

Personal details
- Born: Samuel Foster; 7 December 1931 Lisnaskea, County Fermanagh, Northern Ireland
- Died: 19 August 2014 (aged 82) Enniskillen, County Fermanagh, Northern Ireland
- Party: Ulster Unionist Party
- Spouse: Dorothy Foster
- Children: 3
- Education: Ulster Polytechnic
- Profession: Social Worker, police officer

Major Samuel Foster CBE (7 December 1931 – 19 August 2014) was an Ulster Unionist Party (UUP) politician who served in the Northern Ireland Executive from 1998 to 2002, and was a Member of the Legislative Assembly (MLA) for Fermanagh and South Tyrone from 1998 to 2003.

== Background ==
Foster was educated at Enniskillen Technical College and the Ulster Polytechnic, and was by profession a Social Worker. He was a Special Constable in the Ulster Special Constabulary for 21 years and was an Officer with the rank of Major in the Ulster Defence Regiment until his election to Fermanagh District Council in 1981. He retired from the Council in 2001 having been chairman in 1995–97. He was highly commended for his efforts to rescue victims of the 1987 Remembrance Day bombing, of which he was nearly a victim himself.

He was elected to the Northern Ireland Forum for Political Dialogue in 1996 for Fermanagh & South Tyrone and was elected to the Northern Ireland Assembly in 1998. In 1999 he was appointed Environment Minister by the David Trimble, reportedly as a reward not only to Foster for his long service, but to Fermanagh UUP for their support of Trimble. However, Foster was forced to resign in 2002 with the advancement of Parkinson's disease. He was succeeded by Dermot Nesbitt.

Having been a member of the Northern Ireland Police Authority from 1982 to 1985, he was appointed to the Northern Ireland Policing Board in 1999 on which he remained until it was reconstituted in 2006. Foster was appointed Commander of the Order of the British Empire (CBE) in the 2002 Birthday Honours for political and public service.

He stood down from the Assembly at the 2003 elections.

== Family ==
He was married with three children and was a lifelong member of the Orange Order in Fermanagh. A nephew of Foster's is married to former Democratic Unionist Party (DUP) Leader & First Minister, Arlene Foster. Foster died on 19 August 2014, aged 82.

Northern Ireland Forum
New forum	Member for Fermanagh and South Tyrone; 1996–1998	Forum dissolved
Northern Ireland Assembly
New assembly	MLA for Fermanagh & South Tyrone; 1998–2003	Succeeded by Tom Elliott
Political offices
New office	Minister of the Environment; 1999–2000	Vacant Office suspended Title next held by self
Vacant Office suspended Title last held by self	Minister of the Environment; 2000–2002	Succeeded by Dermot Nesbitt
