= Raymond Ferguson =

Irish rugby union player

Member of Fermanagh District Council
- In office 15 May 1985 – 5 May 2005
- Preceded by: District created
- Succeeded by: Arlene Foster
- Constituency: Enniskillen
- In office 18 May 1977 – 15 May 1985
- Preceded by: George Cathcart
- Succeeded by: District abolished
- Constituency: Fermanagh Area E

Member of the Northern Ireland Assembly for Fermanagh and South Tyrone
- In office 20 October 1982 – 1986

Personal details
- Born: February 16, 1941 (age 84) County Fermanagh, Northern Ireland
- Party: Ulster Unionist Party

Raymond Ferguson (born 16 February 1941) is a Northern Irish former rugby union player with Ulster Rugby and a politician with the Ulster Unionist Party (UUP).

== Early life and career ==
Part of a well established Ulster Unionist family in his native County Fermanagh, Ferguson represented his province at rugby. He studied law at Queen's University, Belfast and subsequently practised as a solicitor, initially in Belfast and then Coleraine before establishing his own still extant legal partnership in Enniskillen.

== Politics ==
Ferguson gained his first elected office in 1977 when he was elected to Fermanagh District Council. He held a seat on the body until 2005. He served as Council Chairman from 1981 to 1983. He was chosen as UUP candidate for the Fermanagh and South Tyrone constituency for the 1979 general election although the seat was retained by sitting Independent Republican MP Frank Maguire. Ferguson was elected to the Northern Ireland Assembly in 1982 for Fermanagh and South Tyrone.

Following the collapse of the Assembly Ferguson became a leading voice in support of the restoration of devolution and in 1988 advocated the adoption by the UUP of a policy in favour of negotiation with constitutional Irish nationalists on both sides of the border. His views were rejected at the annual UUP conference however. The suggestion was labelled a "Lundy-like attack on the leadership" of the party by fellow Fermanagh delegate Sammy Foster.

However Ferguson's moderate views made him popular with the Republic of Ireland's political leaders and he was offered a seat in the Seanad Éireann. He declined the offer due to his opposition to the Anglo-Irish Agreement. Nonetheless his support for cross-community politics continued and in 1992 he publicly criticised colleagues on Fermanagh Council for their refusal to rotate the Council chairmanship with the nationalist Social Democratic and Labour Party.

Northern Ireland Assembly (1982)
New assembly	MPA for Fermanagh and South Tyrone; 1982–1986	Assembly abolished
