= Unity (Northern Ireland) =

Electoral pacts in Northern Ireland

"Unity" was the political label for a series of electoral pacts by Irish nationalist, Irish republican and socialist candidates in Northern Ireland elections in the late 1960s and early 1970s. It also contested elections as a party in its own right, electing six councillors in the 1973 local council elections in the Fermanagh and Dungannon areas, although this was reduced to two members of Fermanagh council in the next election in 1977.

The first victory came in 1969 in the Mid Ulster by-election which was won by 21-year old student Bernadette Devlin. She held her seat in the 1970 general election, when Fermanagh and South Tyrone was won by her colleague Frank McManus. Both lost their seats in the February 1974 general election. Bernadette would later go on to join the IRSP.

In the October 1974 general election the spirit of Unity was revived, if not the name, when Frank Maguire won Fermanagh and South Tyrone as an agreed independent Republican. He held the seat until his death in 1981. In 1978 Unity merged with the remnants of the Nationalist Party to form the Irish Independence Party.

== Election results ==
=== By-election ===
Election	First-Preference Votes	FPv%
1969 Mid Ulster by-election	33,648	53.3%
Unity gain from UUP		

=== General elections ===
Westminster
Election	First-Preference Votes	FPv%	±%	Seats	Seats %	±%
1966 United Kingdom general election	14,645	2.5%	New	0 / 12	0.00%	Steady
1970 United Kingdom general election	140,930	18.1%	▲15.6%	2 / 12	16.67%	▲1
Feb 1974 United Kingdom General Election	17,593	2.4%	▼15.7	0 / 12	0.00%	▼2

=== Local elections ===
Election	First-Preference Votes	FPv%	±%	Seats	Seats %	±%
1973 Northern Ireland local elections	10,281	1.5%	New	6 / 462	1.30%	New
1977 Northern Ireland local elections	5,528	1.0%	▼0.5	2 / 462	0.43%	▼4
