= Irish Independence Party =

Defunct political party in Northern Ireland

- Leader: Pat Fahy (from 1979)
- Chairman: Fergus McAteer
- Deputy Leader: Frank McManus
- Founded: 1977; 48 years ago
- Dissolved: 1985; 40 years ago
- Merger of: Nationalist Party & Unity
- Ideology: Irish nationalism Irish republicanism
- Political position: Centre to centre-left
- Colours: Green

The Irish Independence Party (IIP) was a nationalist political party in Northern Ireland, founded in October 1977 by Frank McManus (former Unity MP for Fermanagh & South Tyrone between 1970 and 1974) and Fergus McAteer (son of Eddie McAteer, who had been leader of the Nationalist Party between 1953 and 1969). The party was effectively a merger of Unity and the Nationalist Party, as the bulk of activists and councillors from the two movements joined IIP. However several independent councillors also joined the party. It was boosted in the late 1970s by the defection of a prominent Protestant Larne Social Democratic and Labour Party (SDLP) councillor, John Turnley, later the party chairman, who was killed in 1980 in Carnlough, County Antrim, by an attack claimed by the Ulster Defence Association.

The party first came to prominence by standing four candidates in the 1979 UK general election. Its best result came in the Mid Ulster constituency where Patrick Fahy captured 12,055 votes (19%), however the main effect was to split the Nationalist vote and prevent the SDLP from gaining the seat.

The IIP continued to grow as it became involved in the campaign to support prisoners in the Maze prison who were "on the blanket" and later hunger strike. The IIP won 21 seats on councils in the local elections of 1981 as a result of its involvement with the campaign, although this support was fairly localised, with 17 of the 21 seats being won in just four councils: Fermanagh, Derry, Omagh and Newry & Mourne. However, for a short period of time it came to be accepted by some as a voice of Irish republicanism (although a number of other groups had similar but smaller localised support, with both the People's Democracy and the Irish Republican Socialist Party securing two seats each in Belfast at the same election).

The IIP boycotted the Assembly elections in October 1982, leaving the field clear for Sinn Féin, who began standing candidates in elections in the early 1980s. As a result, the IIP lost republican support, for example in the first by-election in which Sinn Féin stood, in Omagh in 1983, the IIP were only able to poll 5% in a seat that they had held, while the Sinn Féin candidate took 60%. Meantime moderate nationalists had remained with the SDLP. The party remained active until at least 1985, when it had four councillors elected in local council elections, but appears to have been disbanded before the next local elections in 1989.
