= Fermanagh District Council =

Former local council in Northern Ireland

Coordinates: 54.451°N 7.713°W

Fermanagh District: Ceantar Fhear Manach
- Area: 1,876 km^{2} (724 sq mi); Ranked 1st of 26
- District HQ: Enniskillen
- Catholic: 59.2%
- Protestant: 37.8%
- Country: Northern Ireland
- Sovereign state: United Kingdom
- Councillors: MLAs Fermanagh & South Tyrone Sinn Féin: 3 DUP: 1 UUP: 1; MPs Michelle Gildernew (Sinn Féin)
- Website: www.fermanagh.gov.uk

Fermanagh District Council was a local council in Northern Ireland. It was created out of Fermanagh County Council and later merged with Omagh District Council in April 2015 under local government reorganisation to become Fermanagh and Omagh District Council.

The borders of the district were very similar to those of the traditional County Fermanagh, containing all of that county plus a small section of County Tyrone in the Dromore Road (Irvinestown ward) and Kilskeery Road areas. Council headquarters were in Enniskillen.

== Electoral history ==
=== 1973 to 1981 ===
The elections of 1973 produced a dead heat with 10 Unionists and 10 Nationalists elected. For a while it looked as though Unionists might gain a majority due to an elected independent nationalist John Joe McCusker being ineligible, however in the end he held his seat. The deadlock raised the prospect of the British government having to intervene as both opposing blocs could not agree on the election of chairmen. Eventually however a compromise was reached for the next four years.

Nationalists gained control of the council in 1977 with an 11–9 advantage. However this came to an end with a Unionist gain in 1981 which restored the previous 10-10 balance.

The elections of this period saw many smaller parties winning seats. On the Nationalist side Unity equalled the Social Democratic and Labour Party (SDLP) with four seats in 1973 although this had declined to two seats in 1977. Their successors, the Irish Independence Party became the largest Nationalist party in terms of votes in 1981 and won four seats.

On the Unionist side, after a poor showing in 1973 when they failed to win any seats, the Democratic Unionist Party (DUP) failed to put up any candidates in 1977. This left the field clear for the United Ulster Unionist Party who counted this as their best area with three seats in 1977. The area was the political base of their leader Ernest Baird. However the UUUP had declined by 1981 and did not contest the elections of that year. (One of their former councillors had defected to the DUP and was re-elected as a DUP candidate.)

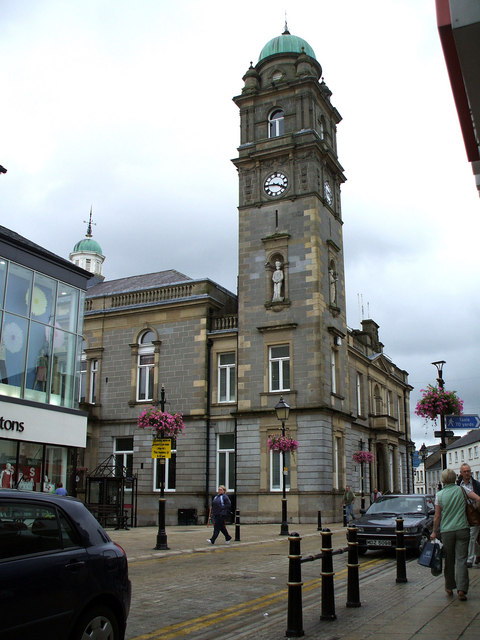
Enniskillen Town Hall, the seat of Fermanagh District Council

=== 1984 boundary changes ===
Boundary changes came into effect for 1985. Previously the council had five electoral areas each of which elected four councillors. A change in legislation meant that it was no longer permitted to have four member electoral areas and thus despite an increase in the number of wards to 23 the number of electoral areas was reduced by one. From then on, Fermanagh District Council area consisted of four electoral areas: Enniskillen and Erne East, West and North. The council was therefore made up of 23 Councillors elected every four years.

=== 1985 election ===
The area had been a major growth area for Sinn Féin in the four years proceeding the council elections of 1985 with the victories in Westminster by-elections of Bobby Sands and Owen Carron (although they were technically elected as Anti H-Block candidates with Sinn Féin backing). Carron was one of five assembly members elected for Sinn Féin in October 1982. The party was further boosted by the defection of sitting independent councillor JJ McCusker in 1984. A former SDLP councillor Tom Murray who had lost his seat as an independent in 1981 was also an SF candidate in 1985. Consequently, Sinn Féin made a major breakthrough winning eight seats in 1985, almost wiping out the Irish Independence party who lost three of their four seats. These gains gave Nationalists a 13–10 advantage over Unionists.

=== Enniskillen and the 1989-1993 elections ===
The Cenotaph bomb of 1987 had a significant and negative impact on the Sinn Féin vote as it took it 16 years to return to 1985 levels. In the 1989 elections their representation was halved to four seats. Crucially they lost two seats to the Ulster Unionist Party (UUP) giving Unionists a one-seat majority on the council, which they retained in 1993.

=== The 1997 election ===
Nationalists were expected to regain control of the council in 1997 but ultimately could only gain one seat from Unionists. This left the council deadlocked with 11 Unionists and 11 Nationalists with an Independent Socialist (formerly Workers' Party) councillor, Davy Kettyles, holding the balance of power.

=== The 2001 and 2005 elections ===
Nationalists finally regained control in 2001 with 13 seats against nine Unionists and one Independent. They consolidated this lead in 2005 when the SDLP gained the seat vacated by the independent who did not stand again.

At the 2005 election the members elected were from the following political parties: nine Sinn Féin, five Ulster Unionist Party (UUP), five Social Democratic and Labour Party (SDLP) and four Democratic Unionist Party (DUP). The chairman of the council was Councillor Stephen Huggett from Sinn Féin and the vice-chairman of the council was Councillor Cyril Brownlee from the DUP.

== Local government structure ==
Map of the district's DEAs from 1993 to 2014

The local government structure here actually pre-dated the setting up of the other 25 Local Councils in Northern Ireland in 1973 – Fermanagh County Council had merged with the district or borough councils in its area before 1973 and had created a model County Council which was seen as a good example of local pragmatic government.

In elections for the Westminster Parliament, Fermanagh is part of the Fermanagh & South Tyrone constituency.

== Review of Public Administration ==
Under the Review of Public Administration (RPA) the council was due to merge with Omagh District Council in 2011 to form a single council for the enlarged area totalling 2829 km^{2} and a population of 105,479. The next election was due to take place in May 2009, but on 25 April 2008 Shaun Woodward, Secretary of State for Northern Ireland announced that the scheduled 2009 district council elections were to be postponed until the introduction of the eleven new councils in 2011.

== Population ==
The area covered by Fermanagh District Council had a population of 61,805 residents according to the 2011 Northern Ireland census.

== See also ==
- Local government in Northern Ireland
