= 2026 Ulster Unionist Party leadership election =

- 31 January 2026
Candidate	Jon Burrows
Running mate	Diana Armstrong
Popular vote	Unopposed
Percentage	100%
Leader before election
Mike Nesbitt
Elected Leader
Jon Burrows

An election for the leadership of the Ulster Unionist Party (UUP) was held on 31 January 2026 following the resignation of Mike Nesbitt as party leader on 2 January 2026. Recently co-opted MLA Jon Burrows was ratified unopposed the party's next leader.

Nesbitt was elected leader in 2024, after previously serving in the role between 2012 and 2017. Two of the party's sitting Members of the Legislative Assembly (MLAs), namely former Police Service of Northern Ireland (PSNI) superintendent Jon Burrows and deputy leader Robbie Butler, were expected to run for the leadership. However, Butler announced at the close of nominations on 15 January 2026 that he would not be a candidate.

== Background ==
Nesbitt was elected unopposed to succeed Doug Beattie as leader in the 2024 leadership election, after previously serving as leader between 2012 and 2017. He is the first person to lead the UUP twice. In a statement on 2 January 2026, Nesbitt said he retook the leadership back in 2024 “to do a short-term job of getting the party match fit for the forthcoming election campaign” and said that task had now been completed.

== Campaign ==
A range of party sources stated that it was impossible to see North Antrim MLA Jon Burrows not standing for the leadership. Some sources have stated that deputy leader and Lagan Valley MLA Robbie Butler may want to avoid a contest, but other insiders have denied this and said of Butler's plans that there was “nothing to indicate that he won't put his name forward”.

Fermanagh and South Tyrone MLA Diana Armstrong was seen as a likely candidate for deputy leader given that she is the party's only female MLA and around a third of the UUP delegates eligible to vote live in Fermanagh.

On 6 January 2026, amid speculation that Armstrong would run for deputy leader on both candidates' tickets, it was reported that she had endorsed Burrows for leader and will be his running mate. Supporters of Butler have criticised the fact that both Armstrong and Burrows were co-opted into the Northern Ireland Assembly.

Burrows and Armstrong were expected to declare their joint candidacy immediately after nominations opened, having the "overwhelming majority" of party members backing them, according to party sources. They launched their campaign on 8 January 2026. If elected, Burrows will not take up a position in the Northern Ireland Executive, stating "I will not be a minister, because I want to lead [the UUP] and make it the biggest party in Northern Ireland."

On 7 January 2026, senior figures within the UUP told Butler to run for leader. It was reported that Butler has "no fear" of a leadership contest. It was reported on 10 January that Butler was taking the weekend to consider his options.

Butler announced at the close of nominations on 15 January 2026 that he would not be putting himself forward for the leadership. He said that he had received support to stand, but it had become "apparent to me and my team that the direction many within the party now wish to pursue would be under a different leadership style".

== Procedure ==
On 2 January 2026, the UUP confirmed a leadership selection process would “shortly” be outlined and “ensuring an inclusive, engaging and seamless transition”. Then, on 3 January 2026, the party began the process of seeking a venue to host an annual general meeting where hundreds of delegates would gather to elect the new leader. A timetable for the contest will be announced early on in the week after Nesbitt's resignation. Members will be notified of the date and venue for the AGM, and nominations for the leadership will then open. The party has been described as "the most democratic party in Northern Ireland" with all members able to vote in a leadership race. The voting will take place on 31 January 2026.

The UUP formally commenced its leadership transition process on 7 January 2026. Nominations will close on 15 January 2026 and Nesbitt will remain as leader until a new leader and deputy leader are elected jointly on 31 January 2026. As part of this process, the party will also host two internal, members-only hustings events to allow prospective candidates to engage directly with the membership.

Key dates
Date	Event
7–15 January	Nomination period; potential candidates needed to gather 35 signatures from 9 constituency associations before 15 January 2026.
31 January	An Extraordinary General Meeting (EGM) of the Ulster Unionist Council will be held at the Stormont Hotel in Belfast. At this meeting, in accordance with Party Rules, members will elect a new Leader and Deputy Leader jointly.

== Candidates ==
=== Leader ===
Candidates will need to be nominated by a number of members from around half of the party's eighteen constituency associations. On 3 January, The Belfast Telegraph reported that the UUP was planning for a leadership contest between Robbie Butler and Jon Burrows. However, Butler announced on 15 January that he would not stand.

==== Declared ====
- Jon Burrows, MLA for North Antrim (2025–present)
  - Running mate: Diana Armstrong, MLA for Fermanagh and South Tyrone (2024–present)

Candidate	Political office	Running mate	Announced	Source
Jon Burrows	MLA for North Antrim (2025–present)	Diana Armstrong	8 January 2026	

==== Declined ====
- Diana Armstrong, MLA for Fermanagh and South Tyrone (2024–present) (Running for deputy leader; Endorsed Burrows)
- Doug Beattie, former leader (2021–2024), MLA for Upper Bann (2016–present)
- Robbie Butler, deputy leader (2021–present), MLA for Lagan Valley (2016–present)
- Tom Elliott, Baron Elliott of Ballinamallard, party chairman (2025–present), former leader (2010-12), Member of the House of Lords (2024–present)

=== Deputy leader ===
The position of UUP Deputy Leader was formally created following a new party constitution adopted on March 29, 2025. Robbie Butler MLA was subsequently nominated and approved as the party's first official Deputy Leader on July 5, 2025. Prior to this formal creation, the term "deputy leader" was often used to refer to the UUP's Deputy Leader of the Assembly Group, a role Butler also held from May 2021. Under new party rules, the deputy leader is elected on the same ticket as the leader.

==== Declared ====
- Diana Armstrong, MLA for Fermanagh and South Tyrone (2024–present) (Endorsed Burrows for leader)

Candidate	Political office	Running mate	Announced	Source
Diana Armstrong	MLA for Fermanagh and South Tyrone (2024–present)	Jon Burrows	8 January 2026	

== Opinion polling ==
=== UUP voters ===
Dates conducted	Pollster	Client	Sample size	Jon Burrows	Robbie Butler	Don't know
16–19 January 2026	LucidTalk	Belfast Telegraph	2,975	56%	34%	10%

=== All unionist voters ===
Dates conducted	Pollster	Client	Sample size	Jon Burrows	Robbie Butler	Don't know
16–19 January 2026	LucidTalk	Belfast Telegraph	2,975	53%	27%	20%

Among voters of other unionist parties

Democratic Unionist Party (DUP) voters

Dates conducted	Pollster	Client	Sample size	Jon Burrows	Robbie Butler	Don't know
16–19 January 2026	LucidTalk	Belfast Telegraph	2,975	52%	26%	22%

Traditional Unionist Voice (TUV) voters

Dates conducted	Pollster	Client	Sample size	Jon Burrows	Robbie Butler	Don't know
16–19 January 2026	LucidTalk	Belfast Telegraph	2,975	54%	15%	31%

== Results ==
At the close of nominations on 15 January 2026, Jon Burrows was the only candidate nominated. On 31 January 2026 he officially became leader of the party.
