= 2024 Ulster Unionist Party leadership election =

- 20 August – 28 September 2024
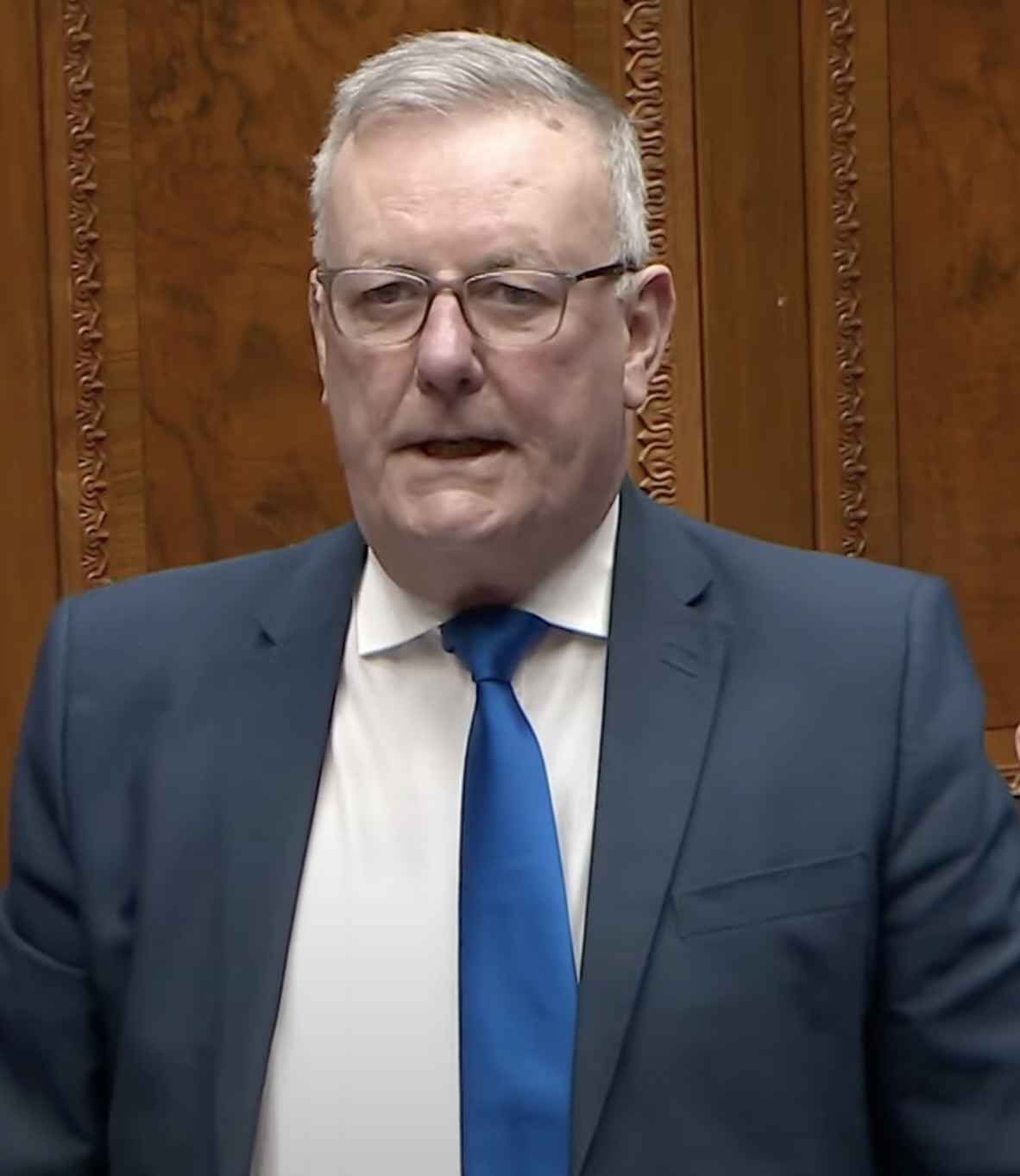
Candidate	Mike Nesbitt
Popular vote	Unopposed
Percentage	100%
Leader before election
Doug Beattie
Elected Leader
Mike Nesbitt

An election for the leadership of the Ulster Unionist Party (UUP) was held on 14 September 2024 at an extraordinary meeting of the Ulster Unionist Council following the resignation of incumbent leader Doug Beattie on 19 August 2024. Beattie resigned following internal tensions surrounding the selection of Colin Crawford as the party's new North Antrim Assembly member.

Former leader and current Health Minister Mike Nesbitt ran unopposed. He became the party's fifth leader in seven years.

== Background ==
=== Division within the UUP ===
Under Beattie's leadership, the UUP returned to the House of Commons at the 2024 general election following Robin Swann's victory in South Antrim. The party selected Colin Crawford to succeed Swann as Member of the Legislative Assembly (MLA) for North Antirm in July 2024. It is reported there were "irreconcilable differences" between Beattie and party officers over the selection of Crawford. It is believed only two party officers had supported Beattie prior to his decision to step down as leader. Ballymoney councillor Darryl Wilson left the UUP in December 2024 following his "disappointment" over the selection of Crawford. It has been reported that a complaint submitted by Wilson regarding the selection process to replace Swann was not responded to by party management.

This also followed a split within the party in February 2024 over Beattie's desire for the UUP to enter opposition at Stormont despite the majority of his colleagues disagreeing. In the event, the UUP took the health portfolio in the Executive when devolution returned. UUP MLA Andy Allen then criticised the appointment of Robin Swann as Health Minister as Swann was already confirmed as a Westminster candidate.

The appointment of Mike Nesbitt as Health Minister in May 2024 following Swann's resignation prompted a resignation from UUP Antrim and Newtownabbey Borough Councillor Paul Michael, who cited Nesbitt's breach of the COVID-19 regulations during the pandemic when he was involved in an extramarital affair.

=== Resignation of Doug Beattie ===
Amid speculation over his position, Beattie released a statement on 19 August 2024 confirming his resignation:

It is now clear that some believe the momentum needed to keep the Ulster Unionist Party moving in the right direction cannot come from me. Irreconcilable differences between myself and Party Officers combined with the inability to influence and shape the party going forward means that I can no longer remain the Party Leader. Therefore, I shall stand down as the Party Leader and allow the party to immediately begin the process to select a new leader who may maintain the confidence of the party and continue the momentum I have started.

Former UUP North Belfast Assembly candidate and former councillor Julie-Anne Corr-Johnston spearheaded a grassroots revolt within the UUP aiming for a no confidence vote to be held in party officers who “forced” out Beattie as leader. The campaign ultimately wanted Beattie back as leader of the party. They were seeking to gather 30 signatures of members of the UUP’s Executive Committee in order for a wider meeting of representatives to be called and a no confidence vote held. Beattie stated on 21 August that it "would simply not be credible, or right, for me to put my name forward to be re-elected as the party leader." He said he will back a "moderate and inclusive" new leader. Corr-Johnston and a second former councillor consequently resigned from the UUP.

On 21 August 2024, UUP Chair and party officer Jill Macauley sent correspondence to all party members disputing Beattie's claim that he resigned due to "irreconcilable differences" with party officers. In the message, Macauley said that was "not the case" and that party officers had "worked hard to seek a positive outcome", but that it was not possible. She said Beattie's resignation was unforced and that party leaders "did not request it".

== Campaign ==
The UUP was operating under a media blackout on the events embroiling the party following Beattie's exit. Despite deputy leader Robbie Butler having ruled himself out of the contest, there was some speculation that liberal unionists Butler and Chief Whip John Stewart would run on a joint ticket for the leadership and deputy leadership to keep the party on the progressive path started by Beattie.

On 27 August 2024, the News Letter reported that Health Minister Mike Nesbitt was likely to be the only candidate for the leadership and would run on a ticket of reforming the party. In a statement, Butler backed Nebsitt saying he would lead a "revised and refreshed" leadership team offering "an exciting opportunity". Nesbitt was expected to remain as Health Minister when he takes up the leadership role.

== Procedure ==
The Belfast Telegraph reported that UUP party officers met on 20 August 2024 to agree on a selection process for their new leader. The officer board comprises 14 representatives from various levels of government.

Key dates
Date	Event
20–30 August	Nomination period; potential candidates needed to gather 35 signatures from 9 constituency associations before 16:30 BST on Friday 30 August.
~~14 September~~	~~An extraordinary meeting of the Ulster Unionist Council will be held to elect or ratify the new leader.~~
28 September	The new leader will be ratified at the party's conference.

== Candidates ==
Potential candidates for the leadership included Member of Parliament (MP) for South Antrim Robin Swann and Health Minister Mike Nesbitt MLA. Professor Jon Tonge from the University of Liverpool stated he believed current deputy leader Robbie Butler MLA and Ulster Unionist Chief Whip John Stewart MLA would seek the party leadership. However, Butler subsequently ruled himself out.

=== Declared ===
- Mike Nesbitt, Minister of Health (2024–present), MLA for Strangford (2011–present), former leader (2012–2017)

=== Declined ===
- Doug Beattie, incumbent leader (2021–present), MLA for Upper Bann (2016–present)
- Robbie Butler, deputy leader (2021–present), MLA for Lagan Valley (2016–present) (Endorsed Nesbitt)
- John Stewart, Chief Whip (2021–present), MLA for East Antrim (2017–present)

== Endorsements ==
MLA public endorsements
Candidate	Endorsements	%	Notes
Mike Nesbitt	3	33.3	Includes Nesbitt himself
No endorsement	6	66.7	

=== Mike Nesbitt ===
==== MLAs ====
- Steve Aiken, former leader (2019–2021), MLA for South Antrim (2016–present)
- Robbie Butler, deputy leader (2021–present), MLA for Lagan Valley (2016–present)

== Results ==
Nominations closed at 16:30 BST on Friday 30 August 2024. Nesbitt was the only nominated candidate received by party officers and was thus elected.

== Aftermath ==
Following the closure of nominations, Nesbitt held a press conference in which he paid tribute to the outgoing leader, Doug Beattie, stating that whenever he became leader last time Beattie’s name “was the first on the list of the people I wanted to attract into the party”. However, Nesbitt refused to state whether Beattie had backed his nomination. Speaking about the current state of the UUP, he said it "looks like what has happened is a badly split party."

On 9 September 2024, it was revealed that at a recent meeting of Party Officers it was decided to ratify Nesbitt as party leader as the first order of business of the Party Conference on 28 September 2024, meaning the proposed extraordinary general meeting for 14 September was cancelled.

In July 2025, Nesbitt remarked that he may step down as UUP leader before the next Northern Ireland Assembly election, which would trigger a leadership election. He subsequently announced his resignation as leader on 2 January 2026.
