= 2017 Ulster Unionist Party leadership election =

Election in Northern Ireland

- 8 April 2017
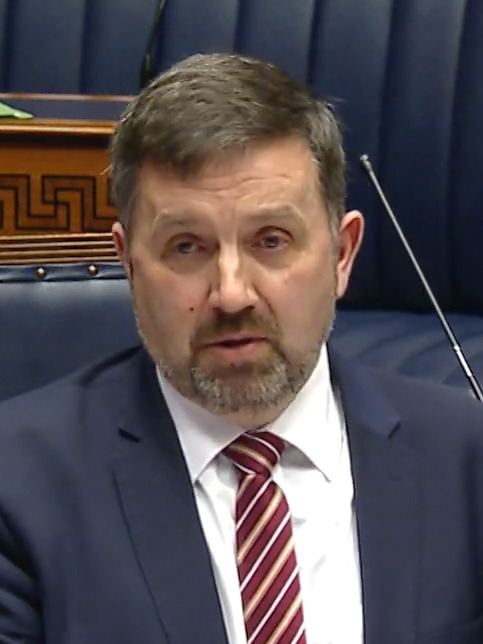
Candidate	Robin Swann
Popular vote	Unopposed
Percentage	100%
Leader before election
Mike Nesbitt
Elected Leader
Robin Swann

An election for the leadership of the Ulster Unionist Party (UUP) was held on 8 April 2017 at the party's Annual General Meeting. Elections are held every year, with the incumbent usually reelected unopposed. The 2017 contested election was triggered after incumbent Leader Mike Nesbitt, elected in 2012, announced his intention to step down as the party leader following the 2017 Assembly election. While initially, Robin Swann and Steve Aiken were expected to run against each other (with candidacies by Doug Beattie, Robbie Butler and Roy Beggs Jr. also considered possible), in the end only Swann ran for the position and was elected unopposed.
