= PSNI data breaches =

Data breaches affecting the Police Service of Northern Ireland

The Police Service of Northern Ireland suffered two data breaches in 2023.

== Accidental data breach ==
On 8 August 2023 the PSNI announced that there had been an accidental data breach caused by data being mistakenly published online to the WhatDoTheyKnow website in response to a freedom of information request. PSNI assistant chief constable Chris Todd said that leaked data included surnames, initials, ranks or grades, locations and departments of all PSNI employees. The PSNI apologised for the breach.

=== Events ===
A document was mistakenly published online at about 14:30 on 8 August 2023. It was available for about two hours before it was taken down.

On 10 August Chief Constable Simon Byrne said that dissident republicans had claimed to have copies of the leaked information, which had been circulating on WhatsApp.

=== Reactions ===
The Police Federation for Northern Ireland called for an "urgent inquiry" into the data breach.

Ulster Unionist Party Mike Nesbitt representative on the Policing Board called for an urgent meeting of the board.

Alliance Party leader Naomi Long said that the sheer scale of the breach was "profoundly concerning".

== Data theft ==
On 9 August 2023 it was revealed that documents, a police issue laptop and radio were stolen from a private vehicle near Newtownabbey on 6 July 2023. This affected about 200 officers and staff members of PSNI.
