= Animal Hospital (disambiguation) =

Animal Hospital is a British television show.

Animal Hospital may also refer to:

- Veterinary medicine, the medicine itself. "Animal hospital" redirects there
