= List of Ulster Unionist Party peers =

This is a list of members of the United Kingdom House of Lords who have represented, or have personal or family links with the Ulster Unionist Party.

This list does not include hereditary peers whose only parliamentary service was in the House of Lords prior to the passage of the House of Lords Act 1999, and who lost their seats under that Act. Nor does it include those in the Peerage of Ireland, who have never had an automatic right to a seat in the House of Lords at Westminster.

Note: There is no such thing as the Peerage of Northern Ireland and peers do not represent geographic areas as such. Some do, however, choose titles which reflect geographical localities, e.g. Lord Kilclooney, this is, however, entirely nominal.

== Current members ==
=== Sitting as Ulster Unionists ===
Name	Entered Lords	Notes
The Lord Elliott of Ballinamallard	16 August 2024	former leader of the Ulster Unionist Party
The Lord Empey	19 January 2011	former leader of the Ulster Unionist Party
The Lord Rogan	22 July 1999	former chairman of the Ulster Unionist Party

=== Sitting under another designation but with Ulster Unionist links ===
Name	Party	Entered Lords	Notes
The Viscount Brookeborough	Crossbencher	11 November 1987	Elected hereditary peer, grandson of a Prime Minister of Northern Ireland and son of an Ulster Unionist Stormont MP.
The Baroness Foster of Aghadrumsee	Non-Affiliated	9 November 2022	former Ulster Unionist MLA, later leader of the Democratic Unionist Party and First Minister of Northern Ireland
The Lord Maginnis of Drumglass	Independent Unionist	20 July 2001	former Ulster Unionist Westminster MP; Suspended from the House since 7 September 2020 for "at least 18 months"
The Lord Kilclooney	Crossbencher	17 July 2001	former deputy leader of the Ulster Unionist Party and former Stormont MP
The Lord Weir of Ballyholme	DUP	16 November 2022	former Ulster Unionist MLA

== Former members ==
=== Living ===
- The Duke of Abercorn former Ulster Unionist Westminster MP
- The Lord Glentoran, Conservative Elected hereditary peer, son and grandson of Stormont MPs for the Ulster Unionist Party

==== Deceased ====
- The 4th Duke of Abercorn, Ulster Unionist member of the Senate of Northern Ireland.
- The 1st Viscount Brookeborough, Prime Minister of Northern Ireland, leader of the Ulster Unionist Party
- The 2nd Viscount Brookeborough, Ulster Unionist Stormont MP
- The Lord Ballyedmond, businessman and member of the Conservative Party and previously of the UUP. Also sat as a Fianna Fáil senator in Seanad Éireann in Dublin.
- The Lord Cooke of Islandreagh, Ulster Unionist member of the Senate of Northern Ireland
- The Lord Carson, leader of the Irish Unionist Party and of the Ulster Unionist Party
- The 1st Viscount Craigavon, Prime Minister of Northern Ireland, leader of the Ulster Unionist Party
- The Lord Faulkner of Downpatrick, Prime Minister of Northern Ireland, Chief Executive of Northern Ireland, leader of the Ulster Unionist Party and latterly of the Unionist Party of Northern Ireland
- The 1st Lord Glentoran, Ulster Unionist Stormont MP.
- The 2nd Lord Glentoran, Ulster Unionist Stormont MP.
- The Lord Laird, chairman of the Ulster-Scots Agency and Ulster Unionist Stormont MP
- The Lord McConnell, Ulster Unionist Stormont MP
- The Lord Molyneaux of Killead, leader of the Ulster Unionist Party
- The Lord Moyola, Prime Minister of Northern Ireland, leader of the Ulster Unionist Party
- The Lord O'Neill of the Maine, Prime Minister of Northern Ireland, leader of the Ulster Unionist Party.
- The 1st Lord Rathcavan, Ulster Unionist Westminster and Stormont MP.
- The 2nd Lord Rathcavan, Ulster Unionist Stormont MP and, later, Alliance Party politician.
- The Lord Steinberg, businessman and member of the Conservative Party, member of the UUP while living in Northern Ireland
- The Lord Trimble, leader of the Ulster Unionist Party, First Minister of Northern Ireland and, later, Conservative politician.
- The 5th Duke of Westminster, Ulster Unionist Westminster MP.
