= Ulster Unionist Party Presidents and General Secretaries =

The Ulster Unionist Party (UUP) was founded in Northern Ireland in 1905. Early leadership records are incomplete.

== Presidents ==
Name	Term start	Term end	Notes
James Hamilton, 2nd Duke of Abercorn	1905	19??	
James Craig, 1st Viscount Craigavon	19??	19??	
J. M. Andrews	19??	19??	
Herbert Dixon, 1st Baron Glentoran	1947	19??	
Basil Brooke, 1st Viscount Brookeborough	195?	19??	
Clarence Graham	1963	196?	
Jack Andrews	1969	1973?	
James G. Cunningham	1973?	1980	
George Anthony Clark	1980	1990	
Josias Cunningham	1990	2000	
Martin Smyth	2000	2004	
Dennis Rogan	2004	2006	
Robert John White	2006	2008	Office merged with that of Chairman - incumbent Chairman David Campbell continuing
May Steele	2016	2020	Honorary President - term ceased on her death
Daphne Trimble	13 March 2023	Incumbent	Honorary President

== General secretaries ==
A list of General Secretaries of the Ulster Unionist Council. From 1998 until 2007, the post was "Chief Executive of the Ulster Unionist Party".

- 1905: T. H. Gibson
- 1906: Dawson Bates
- 1921: Wilson Hungerford
- 1941: Billy Douglas
- 1963: Jim Bailie
- 1974: Norman Hutton
- 1983: Frank Millar Jr
- 1987: Jim Wilson
- 1998: David Boyd
- 2003: Alastair Patterson
- 2004: Lyle Rea
- 2005: Will Corry
- 2007: Jim Wilson
- 2010: Colin McCusker
- 2019: Alexander Redpath

== See also ==
- Ulster Unionist Party
- Leaders of the Ulster Unionist Party
