= Leader of the Ulster Unionist Party =

- Incumbent; Jon Burrows MLA since 31 January 2026
- Appointer: Elected by party
- Inaugural holder: Edward James Saunderson
- Formation: 1905
- Deputy: Diana Armstrong (since 2026)

The leader of the Ulster Unionist Party is the most senior position within the party ranks. Since 2026 the leader has been Jon Burrows MLA.

== List ==
No.	Image	Name	Term start	Term end	Notes	Deputy
1		Colonel Edward Saunderson	1905	1906	Also leader of the Irish Unionist Parliamentary Party	
2		Walter Hume Long	1906	1910	Also leader of the Irish Unionist Parliamentary Party	
3		Sir Edward Carson	1910	1921	Also leader of the Irish Unionist Parliamentary Party	
4		The Viscount Craigavon	1921	1940	1st Prime Minister of Northern Ireland	
5		John Miller Andrews	1940	1943	2nd Prime Minister of Northern Ireland	
6		The Viscount Brookeborough	1943	1963	3rd Prime Minister of Northern Ireland	
7		Captain Terence O'Neill	1963	1969	4th Prime Minister of Northern Ireland	
8		James Chichester-Clark	1969	1971	5th Prime Minister of Northern Ireland	
9		Brian Faulkner	1971	1974	6th and final Prime Minister of Northern Ireland	
10		Harry West	1974	1979		
11		James Molyneaux	1979	1995		
12		David Trimble	1995	2005	First Minister of Northern Ireland	
13		Sir Reg Empey	2005	2010	Minister for Employment and Learning	
14		Tom Elliott	2010	2012		
15		Mike Nesbitt	2012	2017	Leader of the Opposition	
16		Robin Swann	8 March 2017	9 November 2019		
17		Steve Aiken	9 November 2019	27 May 2021		
18		Doug Beattie	27 May 2021	30 August 2024		
15 (2)		Mike Nesbitt	30 August 2024	31 January 2026	Minister of Health	Robbie Butler
19		Jon Burrows	31 January 2026			Diana Armstrong

== See also ==
- Ulster Unionist Party
- Prime Minister of Northern Ireland
- Ulster Unionist Party Presidents and General Secretaries
