= Colin Crawford (politician) =

Ulster Unionist Party politician

Colin Crawford MLA
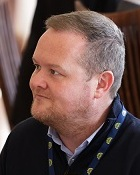

Ulster Unionist Party spokesperson for Education
- In office 28 September 2024 – 29 July 2025
- Leader: Mike Nesbitt
- Preceded by: Robbie Butler
- Succeeded by: Jon Burrows

Ulster Unionist Party spokesperson for the Economy
- In office 9 July 2024 – 28 September 2024
- Leader: Doug Beattie
- Preceded by: Robbie Butler
- Succeeded by: Diana Armstrong

Member of the Legislative Assembly for North Antrim
- In office 9 July 2024 – 29 July 2025
- Preceded by: Robin Swann
- Succeeded by: Jon Burrows

Member of Mid and East Antrim Borough Council
- In office 18 May 2023 – 9 July 2024
- Preceded by: James Henry
- Succeeded by: Brian Thompson
- Constituency: Ballymena

Personal details
- Born: Ballymena, Northern Ireland
- Party: Ulster Unionist

Colin Crawford is a former Ulster Unionist Party (UUP) politician who was a Member of the Northern Ireland Assembly (MLA) for North Antrim from July 2024 until July 2025.

== Political career ==
At the 2023 Mid and East Antrim Borough Council election, Crawford ran as an Ulster Unionist Party (UUP) candidate in the Ballymena District. A member of the Orange Order, he was elected on the first count, having polled 969 first-preference votes. Crawford's election marked the return of a UUP councillor in Ballymena, after the party lost their seat in 2019.

=== Member of the Northern Ireland Assembly (2024–2025) ===
In July 2024, he was co-opted to the Northern Ireland Assembly as a member for North Antrim, following the election of Robin Swann, as MP for South Antrim. His selection caused an internal row within the party, prompting Doug Beattie to resign as leader after he had supported another candidate for the job. Crawford was briefly the UUP's Economy Spokesperson before becoming Education Spokesperson following Mike Nesbitt's election as UUP leader.

On 13 June 2025, less than a year since his co-option, Crawford announced that he would be leaving the Assembly at the end of the month. In a Facebook post, he cited his resignation as "the right decision for me and my family". It was later reported that Crawford had resigned following a disagreement over the wording of a party press release condemning the 2025 Ballymena riots. The UUP asked Crawford to remain as an MLA for the summer to give them more time to find a replacement. He was replaced by Jon Burrows on 29 July 2025.
