= Lynda Bryans =

Northern Irish television presenter and journalist (born 1962)

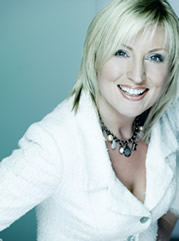
- Born: May 1962 (age 64); Belfast, Northern Ireland
- Occupations: Television presenter, journalist and producer
- Spouse: Mike Nesbitt (m. 1992; sep. 2020)
- Children: 2
- Website: Webpage

Lynda Bryans (born May 1962) is a Belfast-born television presenter and journalist from Northern Ireland.

== Broadcasting career ==
=== Television ===
Bryans began her career in the media industry in 1981. Her first job was working as a temporary copy typist for UTV that summer which was immediately followed by a job working as a secretary in the Religious Affairs department at BBC Northern Ireland. She went on to become a newsreader and reporter on the BBC's Inside Ulster, as well as reading daytime news bulletins and briefly covering continuity shifts for BBC NI. Bryans' career as a broadcaster began when she applied, as a staff member, for a screen test at the BBC, and she became a continuity announcer and newsreader for the Corporation in Belfast. In an interview with The News Letter, she stated, "I thought I'd apply for a laugh, and ended up being one of six picked out of 100."

Bryans also presented on network BBC programmes. She was a presenter and reporter for the BBC News and Current Affairs series Here and Now, and also co-presented with Rolf Harris on Animal Hospital in 1994 and reported for the Holiday programme until its axe in 2007.

Bryans' other television credits include Portrush Sea Rescue, News 40, ITV's recreation of news events from World War II in a contemporary style, and Bethlehem Year Zero and Dateline Jerusalem, recreating the news events at the time of the birth and death of Jesus Christ. From 2001 to 2005, she appeared as an occasional newscaster on the ITV News Channel at weekends.

As well as presenting UTV Live, Bryans and Nesbitt also presented Anglia Television's networked Sunday Morning series from 1999 to 2001 and UTV's home and garden series Home Sweet Home in 2004 and 2006.

She was suspended from duty by UTV for a period from February 2010 due to Nesbitt's decision to stand as a candidate in the 2010 general election. In June 2010, it was announced Bryans was leaving UTV after her contract with the station was not renewed. She hosted her final edition of UTV Live on 30 June 2010.

=== Radio ===
November 2005 saw Bryans become part of the daytime line-up on UTV-owned radio station, U105, hosting the 12.00–15.00 slot, U105 Lunch. She left the station in October 2008.

== Personal life ==
Bryans attended Carryduff Primary School and Ballynahinch Tech.

She was married to former broadcaster and now politician Mike Nesbitt from 1992 until they divorced in 2020

Bryans is a director of the Northern Irish mental health charity Aware Defeat Depression. She is also a patron of the charity Action Cancer, a patron of the Girls' Brigade Northern Ireland, and, along with her husband, is a board member of Youth Lyric.

Bryans co-runs a media production and facilitation company with her husband.

In 2006, Bryans received an award from Belfast Metropolitan College for her contribution to the life of Belfast. She has two children.

She is a practising Christian.
