= Diana Armstrong =

Ulster Unionist Party politician

Diana Armstrong MLA
- Diana Armstrong MLA 2026

Chair of the Committee for Agriculture, Environment and Rural Affairs
- Incumbent
- Assumed office 20 August 2026
- Deputy: Declan McAleer
- Preceded by: Robbie Butler

Deputy Leader of the Ulster Unionist Party
- Incumbent
- Assumed office 31 January 2026
- Leader: Jon Burrows
- Preceded by: Robbie Butler

Ulster Unionist Chief Whip
- Incumbent
- Assumed office 31 January 2026
- Leader: Jon Burrows
- Preceded by: Robbie Butler

Ulster Unionist Party spokesperson for the Economy
- Incumbent
- Assumed office 28 September 2024
- Leader: Mike Nesbitt; Jon Burrows
- Preceded by: Colin Crawford

Member of the Legislative Assembly for Fermanagh and South Tyrone
- Incumbent
- Assumed office 27 September 2024
- Preceded by: Tom Elliott

Member of Fermanagh and Omagh District Council
- In office 8 June 2016 – 27 September 2024
- Preceded by: Rosemary Barton
- Succeeded by: Rosemary Barton
- Constituency: Erne North

Personal details
- Born: February 1961 (age 65) County Fermanagh, Northern Ireland
- Party: Ulster Unionist
- Parent(s): Harry West (father); Maureen West (mother)

Diana Armstrong (born February 1961) is a Northern Irish Ulster Unionist Party (UUP) politician who has served as deputy leader of the UUP since 31 January 2026. Armstrong has been a Member of the Legislative Assembly (MLA) for Fermanagh and South Tyrone since September 2024.

== Background ==
Armstrong is the daughter of former UUP leader Harry West.

Armstrong was the UUP candidate for Fermanagh and South Tyrone in the 2024 general election, the most marginal seat in the United Kingdom with a Sinn Féin majority of just 56 votes over the UUP. She finished in second place with 20,273 votes (39.7%) to Sinn Féin candidate Pat Cullen's 24,844 votes (48.6%).

== Political career ==
=== Local Government ===
Armstrong was co-opted onto Fermanagh and Omagh District Council in June 2016, following Rosemary Barton's election to the Northern Ireland Assembly, where she represented the Erne North District. Armstrong went on to top the poll in the 2019 local elections, and was again re-elected in 2023.

=== Member of the Legislative Assembly ===
On 27 September 2024, Armstrong was co-opted to replace Tom Elliott as Member of the Legislative Assembly (MLA) for Fermanagh and South Tyrone, after he was given a peerage in July as part of the dissolution honours list. She is the only female MLA of the nine MLAs the UUP has at Stormont.

Armstrong spoke of the importance of farming at the UUP's 2024 party conference, stating that "We recognise that farming is the backbone of our economy and will always work for farm families and rural dwellers to strive for better opportunities, accessibility and support..." She was announced by UUP leader Mike Nesbitt as the party's new Economy spokesperson.

Armstrong was announced as a candidate for deputy leader of the UUP in the 2026 leadership election, as the running mate of Jon Burrows. On January 15, 2026, Burrows was announced as the only candidate for the leadership, meaning Armstrong is expected to be ratified as the party's new deputy leader on 31 January 2025.
