= Doug Beattie =

Politician in Northern Ireland

Doug Beattie MC MLA
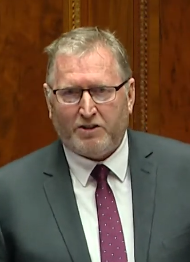

18th Leader of the Ulster Unionist Party
- In office 27 May 2021 – 28 September 2024
- Deputy: Robbie Butler
- Preceded by: Steve Aiken
- Succeeded by: Mike Nesbitt

Ulster Unionist Party spokesperson for Justice
- In office 24 May 2021 – 31 May 2026
- Leader: Himself; Mike Nesbitt; Jon Burrows

Member of the Legislative Assembly for Upper Bann
- Incumbent
- Assumed office 5 May 2016
- Preceded by: Sam Gardiner

Member of the Armagh City, Banbridge and Craigavon Borough Council
- In office 22 May 2014 – 5 May 2016
- Preceded by: Council created
- Succeeded by: Julie Flaherty
- Constituency: Portadown

Personal details
- Born: Douglas Ricardo Beattie; 13 October 1965 (age 61) Andover, Hampshire, England
- Party: Independent (since 2026)
- Other political affiliations: Ulster Unionist Party (2014–2026)
- Spouse: Margaret Beattie
- Children: 2
- Parent: Constance Evelyn Beattie - Willian Edward Beattie
- Education: Royal Military College, Sandhurst
- Profession: Soldier; politician
- Portfolio: Justice
- Website: Official website

Military service
- Allegiance: United Kingdom
- Branch/service: British Army
- Years of service: 1982–2016 (regular); 2016–2025 (reserves)
- Rank: Major
- Unit: Royal Irish Regiment
- Battles/wars: The Troubles; Kosovo War; Iraq War; War in Afghanistan
- Awards: Military Cross; Queen's Commendation for Bravery; NATO Meritorious Service Medal

Douglas Ricardo Beattie MC MLA (born 13 October 1965) is a Northern Irish Independent Unionist politician and former member of the British Army. He was leader of the Ulster Unionist Party (UUP) between 27 May 2021 and 28 September 2024. He resigned his membership of the party in May 2026. Beattie has been a Member of the Northern Ireland Assembly (MLA) for Upper Bann since 2016. He is characterised as a 'progressive' and 'moderate' unionist.

== Early life ==
Beattie was born in 1965 in a military base in Hampshire; his father was a warrant officer in the Royal Ulster Rifles, a regiment of the British Army. The family returned to Portadown, County Armagh, Northern Ireland, when he was 10 following the ending of his father's regular service. The family, which included Beattie and 5 siblings, moved into a house in Union Street, part of loyalist Edgarstown, an area on the outskirts of the town centre.

Beattie's mother died young, leaving his father (who had by this time enlisted with the Ulster Defence Regiment) to raise him, his three sisters and two brothers. At the age of 15 he accidentally shot a friend when the two of them found Beattie Snr's pistol and were playing with it. Although shot in the head, his friend recovered.

== Military career ==
At the age of 16, in 1982, Beattie joined the Royal Irish Rangers and following training in at the Junior Soldiers Battalion in Taunton, Somerset, he was posted to the 2nd Battalion who were stationed in Wavell Barracks, Berlin.

In over 28 years of service, he rose to the rank of Warrant Officer First Class (WO1) and was appointed Regimental Sergeant Major. During that time he served on operations in Bosnia, Kosovo, Iraq and Northern Ireland. He was awarded the General Officer NI Commendation for his actions in Derryard PVCP, the Queen's Commendation for Bravery (for saving the lives of enemy soldiers) and the NATO Meritorious Service Medal. He was commissioned from the ranks in 2005, gaining promotion to captain.

During the Afghanistan War, as part of the Operational Mentoring and Liaison Team, Captain Beattie was part of an operation to retake the town of Garmsir in Helmand Province. As a result of his actions during the intense fighting over several days, he was recommended for, and subsequently awarded, the Military Cross.

Following his return from Afghanistan, Beattie published the first of two books, An Ordinary Soldier, which became an immediate best seller in the United Kingdom and propelled him into the public eye. Beattie's follow-up book was Task Force Helmand. He wrote and published a further book, Reaper, but as he moved into a new career this was not universally advertised.

== Political career ==
Continuing with his Reserve service in the Army Beattie joined the Ulster Unionist Party and was elected to Armagh, Banbridge and Craigavon District Council for the Portadown area in the 2014 local elections.

In May 2016, he was elected as an MLA for the Upper Bann constituency.

Before the 2017 Ulster Unionist Party leadership election, Beattie was named by commentators as a possible contender to replace former leader Mike Nesbitt; however, in the end only Robin Swann ran, and was elected unopposed. In October 2019, after Swann announced he was standing down as leader of the party, Beattie ruled himself out of contention as the next leader and endorsed former Royal Navy commander Steve Aiken and served as Deputy instead.

Beattie stood as a candidate for Member of Parliament for Upper Bann in the 2019 General Election. He came fourth, losing to Carla Lockhart of the Democratic Unionist Party (DUP).

In May and September 2020, Beattie was threatened by the South East Antrim UDA after he condemned threats they had made against journalists.

=== Leader of the Ulster Unionist Party ===
Beattie announced in May 2021 that he was putting his name forward to be the next leader of the UUP following the resignation of Steve Aiken. He said that he would be "able to reach out to all people in Northern Ireland regardless of what your religion is, sexual orientation or ethnicity". Beattie was elected unopposed on 17 May 2021, and was officially ratified 10 days later.

In January 2022, Beattie apologised after posting a joke on Twitter about the wife of DUP politician Edwin Poots. In the aftermath, several of Beattie's historic tweets re-emerged, containing content that was perceived as "casually misogynistic", and including derogatory comments about women and members of the Irish Traveller community. The tweets were posted between 2011 and 2014, while Beattie was still a serving soldier and before he entered politics. Beattie said that he was "deeply ashamed" of the historic tweets.

Beattie attended protests against the Northern Ireland Protocol, the post-Brexit trade arrangements. In March 2022, he announced he would continue to oppose the Protocol but would no longer take part in the series of rallies. Beattie said they had been hijacked by some who were intent on raising tensions. Following this, his constituency office in Portadown was attacked, and a poster of a noose around his neck appeared at a loyalist rally in Lurgan.

At the 2022 Assembly election, he was the fourth candidate elected in Upper Bann, despite initial reports that he was at risk of losing his seat. During the election count, Beattie told the Belfast Telegraph that “I’ve set the direction of travel. What we have done previously, within the Ulster Unionist Party, is when something bad happens we feel we have to rethink what we’re doing’ and we’ve gone off in a completely different direction.“I don’t believe that’s the case this time.”

Beattie caused further controversy in December 2022, when during a debate on restoring the Northern Ireland Executive, he said that the DUP "scream, whinge and whine like a girl from the sidelines". He subsequently apologised for the remarks.

Following losses for the UUP in the 2023 local elections, Beattie said that unionism was always likely to "take a hit across the board" due to Sinn Féin's growth. He remarked, however, that "a fully functioning Stormont will stop the swing to Sinn Fein in its tracks."

Throughout his leadership of the Ulster Unionist Party, Beattie had repeatedly called for the restoration of the devolved Northern Ireland Executive. In August 2023, he said that the absence of a devolved government is "causing untold harm in Northern Ireland" and, without an Executive, Northern Ireland has "no say, no scrutiny and absolutely no power."

During his time as the Ulster Unionist Party leader he commemorated the centenary of Northern Ireland being created, attended the funeral of Queen Elizabeth II and the coronation of King Charles III. He also attended St Patrick's Day celebrations in Washington, meeting the then President Joe Biden.

==== Resignation ====
On 19 August 2024, it was reported that Beattie was going to resign as UUP leader. He confirmed this in a statement later that same day, stating: “It is now clear that some believe the momentum needed to keep the Ulster Unionist party moving in the right direction cannot come from me. Irreconcilable differences between myself and party officers combined with the inability to influence and shape the party going forward means that I can no longer remain the party leader.”

It is thought that Beattie's resignation was in response to party officers' decision to not support the co-option of Ballymoney councillor Darryl Wilson as MLA for North Antrim, following the election of Robin Swann as MP for South Antrim. Ballymena councillor Colin Crawford was instead selected for the seat.

Following his announcement, there was speculation that he would stand in the subsequent leadership election, though Beattie ruled himself out, saying: "It would simply not be credible, or right, for me to put my name forward to be re-elected as the party leader. I must accept that while a large number would like me to stay as leader there is an equal number that may not."

=== Post-leadership ===
==== Deselection and resignation from the Ulster Unionist Party ====
In May 2026, Beattie was reportedly facing deselection from standing again at the Upcoming Assembly election. The Upper Bann constituency association were expected to select councillor Kyle Savage over Beattie to run in the election at a meeting the following month. On facing potential deselection, Beattie said: "My name is forward. I want to run in the next assembly election as an Ulster Unionist Party candidate for Upper Bann. I have held the seat for ten years, I have reached quota in every single election in those ten years and I want to do the same again. I think I’ve got a lot to offer.” He also did not rule out running as an independent or for another party were he unsuccessful in getting the nomination. A party spokesperson commented: "All candidate selection activity within the Ulster Unionist Party is governed by its rules and standing orders. The party appreciates that its internal procedures may, on occasion, attract outside interest. However, it would not be appropriate for the party to offer comment on the details of matters of this nature."

On 22 May 2026, UUP leader Jon Burrows confirmed that the party would now be fielding two candidates in Upper Bann, with Beattie reportedly being one of the selected candidates.

On 26 May 2026, Beattie's constituency office manager, UUP Craigavon councillor Kate Evans, resigned her membership. In a statement regarding her decision to leave the party, she said: "The strain of internal party politics has taken a significant toll on my mental wellbeing, and I have come to the difficult conclusion that stepping away is necessary for my own health." Reacting to her decision on social media, Beattie said: "Over the last 10 years, you have served the party and me with unswerving loyalty, commitment and professionalism. Nobody will know what you have had to endure because of that loyalty, but in the end, you must look after your own well-being. I look forward to continuing to work with you in my constituency office, knowing that much of what you do goes unnoticed." Keith Wilkinson, another member of Beattie's staff, resigned from his position as outreach worker after promoting Kyle Savage's candidacy on social media.

Beattie confirmed his own resignation as a UUP member on 31 May 2026. In a letter to Burrows, he described how there had been a "deterioration in the relationships between the Party Management Board, constituency associations, the Ulster Unionist Councillor Association, and the MLA group at Stormont." Beattie also hit out at Burrows' leadership in relation to this, adding: "this became particularly apparent and accelerated following your election as party leader, when MLAs were increasingly marginalised, ignored, isolated and discredited. Your leadership style became dismissive and overly centralised, empowering individuals to actively undermine elected representatives. In the absence of any coherent policy direction from the leadership, a toxic atmosphere has been allowed to flourish within the party." In response, the UUP put forward a statement, thanking Beattie for "his many years of service to his country and to the party", but added that party did not accept Beattie's "characterisation of recent events" in his letter.

On 1 June 2026, Beattie told broadcaster Stephen Nolan that he had been "tipped over the edge", after Burrows had phoned him the previous week to say that the party was reopening "a disciplinary case against me for tweets which I apologised for four years ago and had considerable media attention". Beattie described Burrows as "vindictive" for reopening the case. He also expressed regret over persuading Burrows to join the party, and also admitted to being "economical with the truth", in relation to him posting a video claiming to be campaigning with UUP councillors Ian Burns and Glen Barr in Banbridge.

In July 2026, in an interview with the political podcast Stormont Sources, Beattie confirmed that he would be seeking re-election in Upper Bann as an independent.

== Views ==
Beattie has described himself as "an Irishman", identifying as Irish, Northern Irish and British.

Beattie has been characterized as a 'progressive' and 'moderate' within the Ulster Unionist Party, but said upon his election as leader that those with conservative values had "nothing to fear" from him and that he would "tread a path to make sure that your voice is heard and I will never denigrate your opinion". He proposed a motion in Stormont calling for a ban on gay conversion therapy, which passed, and argued "[there] is no therapy that would make me a gay man. So why would we say that a gay man can be fixed or cured? There isn't. It's ludicrous. Conversion therapy is humiliating."

Beattie is against the Northern Ireland Protocol, the post-Brexit trade arrangements, believing it is damaging to the Belfast Agreement. He said "I do not want a hardened border on the island of Ireland, but neither do I want a border in the Irish Sea".

A former soldier, Beattie has pressed for Northern Ireland to adopt the Armed Forces Covenant and ensure support for military veterans and their families. He also argues that soldiers who served during the Troubles should not be immune from prosecution, saying "Soldiers were here to stand between the terrorists and the terrorised. If they went outside the law then they have to face the law".

Beattie is a firm supporter of devolution and has opposed boycotts of the devolved institutions in Northern Ireland.

As a proponent of the Belfast Agreement, Beattie is opposed to the St Andrews Agreement as he believes it "changed" the Belfast Agreement and turned "every election into a sectarian headcount."

Northern Ireland Assembly
Preceded by Sam Gardiner	MLA for Upper Bann; 2016–present	Incumbent
Party political offices
Preceded by Steve Aiken	Leader of the Ulster Unionist Party; 2021–2024	Succeeded by Mike Nesbitt
