= Mike Nesbitt =

Northern Irish politician (born 1957)

Mike Nesbitt MLA
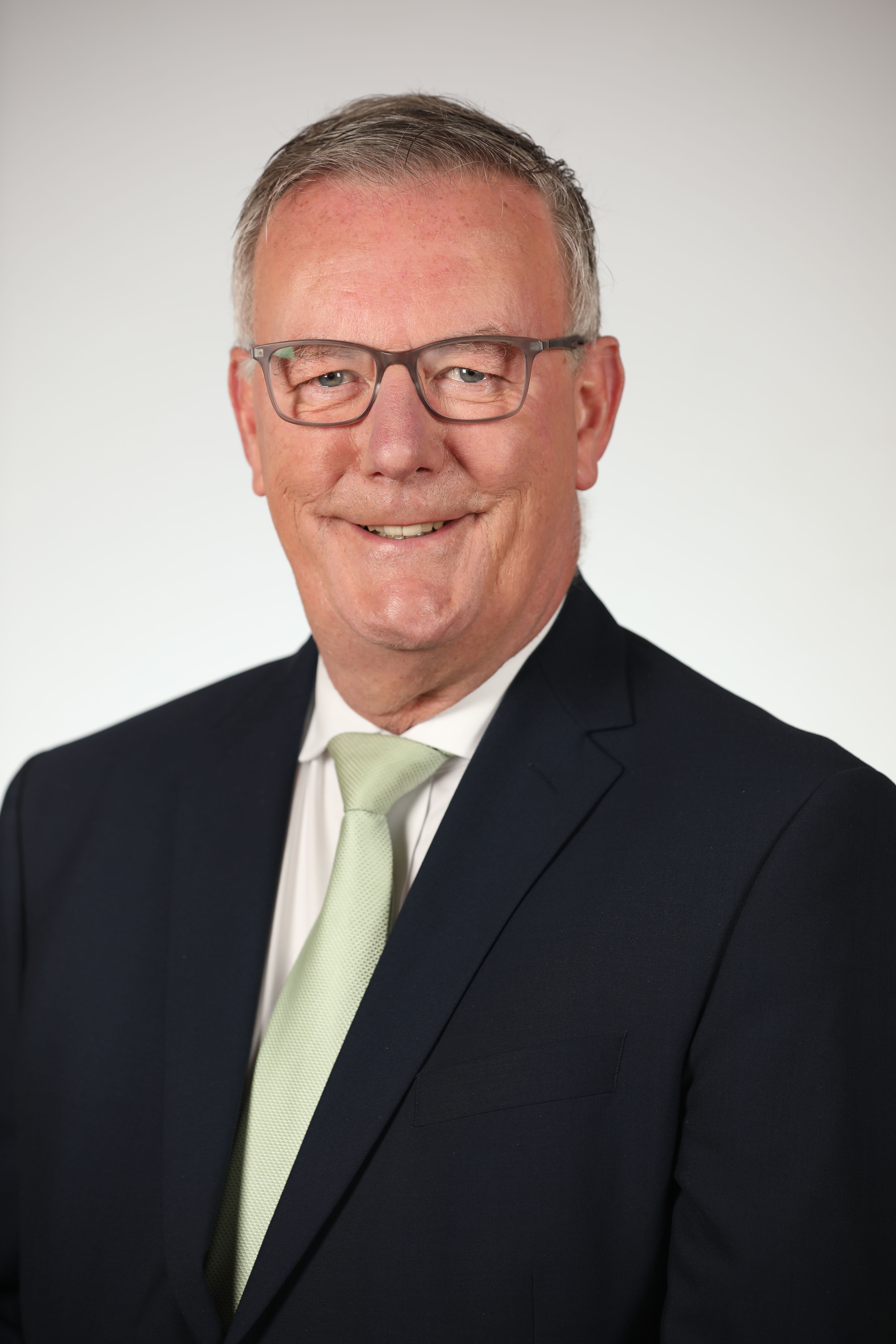
- Nesbitt in 2022

Minister of Health
- In office 28 May 2024 – 18 August 2026
- First Minister: Michelle O'Neill
- Preceded by: Robin Swann
- Succeeded by: Robbie Butler

Leader of the Ulster Unionist Party
- In office 28 September 2024 – 31 January 2026
- Deputy: Robbie Butler
- Preceded by: Doug Beattie
- Succeeded by: Jon Burrows
- In office 31 March 2012 – 8 April 2017
- Deputy: John McCallister; Robin Swann
- Preceded by: Tom Elliott
- Succeeded by: Robin Swann

Member of the Legislative Assembly for Strangford
- Incumbent
- Assumed office 5 May 2011
- Preceded by: Simpson Gibson

Assembly Private Secretary to the Health Minister
- In office 21 April 2024 – 28 May 2024
- Minister of Health: Robin Swann

Ulster Unionist Party spokesperson for the Economy
- In office 25 May 2021 – 28 May 2024
- Leader: Doug Beattie
- Succeeded by: Colin Crawford
Committee history
Deputy Chair of the Committee for The Executive Office
In office 14 January 2020 – 4 May 2020
Chair	Colin McGrath
Preceded by	Danny Kennedy (2017)
Succeeded by	Doug Beattie
Chair of the Committee for The Executive Office
In office 25 May 2016 – 25 January 2017
Deputy	Sandra Overend; Danny Kennedy
Preceded by	himself (as Chair of the Committee for the Office of the First Minister and deputy First Minister)
Succeeded by	Colin McGrath (2020)
Chair of the Committee for the Office of the First Minister and deputy First Minister
In office 17 April 2012 – 30 March 2016
Deputy	Chris Lyttle
Preceded by	Tom Elliott
Succeeded by	himself (as Chair of the Committee for The Executive Office)
Chair of the Committee for Education
In office 31 January 2012 – 17 April 2012
Chair	Mervyn Storey
Preceded by	David McNarry
Succeeded by	Danny Kinahan

Commissioner for Victims and Survivors
- In office June 2008 – 17 February 2010 Serving with Patricia McBride, Brendan McAllister and Bertha McDougall
- Preceded by: Position established (Bertha McDougall as sole interim Commissioner)
- Succeeded by: Kathryn Stone (2012)

Personal details
- Born: 11 May 1957 (age 69) Belfast, Northern Ireland
- Party: Ulster Unionist Party
- Spouse: Unknown (before 1990) Lynda Bryans (m. 1992; sep. 2020)
- Children: 4
- Education: Jesus College, Cambridge; Queen's University Belfast
- Occupation: Politician
- Profession: Journalist
- Known for: Television presenter

Michael Nesbitt, MLA (born 11 May 1957) is a Northern Irish politician and former broadcaster. He served as Minister of Health from 28 May 2024 until 18 August 2026. Nesbitt became Leader of the Ulster Unionist Party (UUP) on 30 August 2024, following his successful candidacy in the 2024 leadership election, and left the position on 31 January 2026; he had previously served in that role from 2012 to 2017. He has been a Member of the Northern Ireland Assembly (MLA) for Strangford since 2011.

Nesbitt was appointed as the Ulster Unionist Party's Economy spokesperson by Doug Beattie and was briefly the private secretary to the Health Minister, Robin Swann, in preparation for him succeeding Swann. Following Beattie's resignation as UUP leader on 19 August 2024, Nesbitt launched a successful campaign to succeed him. In January 2026, he announced his resignation as UUP leader for the second time, leading to another leadership contest.

== Broadcasting career ==
Nesbitt worked as a sports reporter at BBC Northern Ireland and progressed to presenting Good Morning Ulster on BBC Radio Ulster from 1986 to 1990. Nesbitt joined UTV as a presenter and reporter in 1992, being joined by his wife Lynda Bryans to co-present evening news programme UTV Live in 1996.

Nesbitt and Bryans also co-presented weekly religious series Sunday Morning for Anglia Television from 1999 to 2001, and two series of home and garden series Home Sweet Home for UTV.

Nesbitt also hosted Counterpoint and made a guest appearance in comedy programme Everything You Know Is Wrong in 1998.

In 2006, Nesbitt announced he was not renewing his presenting contract with UTV. His final edition of UTV Live was broadcast on 10 February 2006.

== Political career ==
In January 2008, Nesbitt was announced as a Commissioner of Victims and Survivors, a Northern Ireland Assembly role designed to promote the interests of victims of the Troubles.

Nesbitt resigned from the post on 17 February 2010 to become the parliamentary candidate for the Ulster Conservatives and Unionists – New Force in the constituency of Strangford. He lost out to the Democratic Unionist Party's Jim Shannon in the election.

In the 2011 Northern Ireland Assembly election, Nesbitt was elected as one of six MLAs representing Strangford.

Nesbitt is regarded as one of the more liberal unionists, he had previously stated his opposition to same-sex marriage, but spoke in favour in 2017. His appeal to change the hands of leadership in Northern Ireland with the Social Democratic and Labour Party and Alliance Party fell on the deaf ears of Northern Irish society in which the Democratic Unionist Party and Sinn Féin claimed an increased victory over the opposing parties. He has been compared to reforming and liberal Ulster Unionist Party Prime Minister of Northern Ireland Terence O'Neill by some historians and politicians.

In May 2020, Nesbitt resigned as deputy chair of an Assembly committee after he admitted breaking COVID-19 lockdown rules by visiting a female friend. He announced that he had separated from his wife in January of that year.

Nesbitt was the UUP representative on the NI Policing Board from July 2020 until 2024.

Nesbitt was the Ulster Unionist Party's Economy spokesperson. In this role, he called on the United Kingdom government to cut Northern Ireland's corporation tax to appeal to businesses and U.S. investment in NI. In August 2023, he called for duty-free shopping for flights from Northern Ireland to the EU to be reinstated.

Nesbitt voiced concerns over the safety implications of the PSNI data leak. Furthermore, he said that he was concerned for the "wellbeing of the officers and police staff." Nesbitt also wrote to the Chief Constable Simon Byrne to ask for clarity over the theft of a police laptop.

On 22 August 2023, following an emergency meeting of the Policing Board, Nesbitt called on PSNI leadership "to form a plan to improve the appalling levels of low confidence in the PSNI." This came after a LucidTalk opinion poll revealed that public confidence in the PSNI was at its lowest ever.

In 2024, Nesbitt was appointed as the private secretary to the Health Minister, Robin Swann, and succeeded Swann as Health Minister following his resignation following the calling of the 2024 general election, in which Swann was a candidate.

== Minister of Health (2024–2026) ==
=== Appointment ===
Nesbitt succeeded Robin Swann as Health Minister following his resignation on 28 May 2024. His appointment prompted a resignation from the UUP after Antrim and Newtownabbey Borough Councillor Paul Michael resigned citing Nesbitt's breach of the COVID-19 regulations during the pandemic in which he was involved in an extramarital affair as the reason. Nesbitt called being health minister "the political honour" of his life but also the "ultimate political challenge of my life."

=== Tenure ===
On 29 May 2024, Nesbitt stated that he is not prepared to implement "catastrophic cuts" to services. He also vowed not to shirk hard or controversial decisions in the remaining three years of the Assembly mandate. He also visited L'Arche Village in Belfast and presented certificates at the Orchardville Society's annual awards at Titanic Belfast in his first engagements. Nesbitt said that he would be a champion for both patients and healthcare staff.

Nesbitt welcomed the increase in the number of people supporting organ donation in Northern Ireland following the one year anniversary of the introduction of Dáithi's Law on 31 May 2024.

On 3 June 2024, Nesbitt made his opening statement to the Northern Ireland Assembly as Health Minister.

Nesbitt stressed the importance of being aware of the dangers of UV exposure on 5 June 2024. He visited Kirkinriola Primary School to take part in a Cancer Focus Northern Ireland Sun Scientist session.

On 12 June 2024, Nesbitt said that the Health Inequalities Annual Report must be essential reading across all parts of public life in Northern Ireland, stating that health inequalities are 'a challenge to us all.'

Nesbitt congratulated Health and Social Care staff honoured in the 2024 Birthday Honours list on 14 June 2024. He sent his "warmest congratulations to each and every person nominated."

On 25 June 2024, Nesbitt welcomed the publication of final draft NICE guidance recommending use of the drugs Kaftrio, Orkambi and Symkevi for cystic fibrosis.

Nesbitt praised local health trusts after Northern Ireland became the first region in the UK to have all its diagnostic imaging services accredited on 26 June 2024.

On 28 June 2024, Nesbitt praised a family-run GP surgery for its commitment to the rural community in South Armagh.

Nesbitt welcomed additional in-year funding for the Department of Health on 1 July 2024. However, he also said a "significant shortfall" remains in the department's budget.

On 9 July 2024, Nesbitt announced that core grant funding for community and voluntary organisations will be maintained. He confirmed that £1.8m will be distributed, keeping it at the same level as the previous year. Nesbitt also announced £200,000 funding to help those suffering from substance abuse and mental health difficulties.

Nesbitt announced a series of key initiatives planned for the next six months on 10 July 2024. He also said that tackling health inequalities must be a "priority across all parts of government."

On 11 July 2024, Nesbitt made his first visit to Altnagelvin Hospital. He met with staff across a range of services and took a tour of the facilities.

Nesbitt welcomed social care reports on 18 July 2024. He emphasised that reforming adult social care is about so much more than easing hospital pressures.

On 19 July 2024, Nesbitt welcomed the BMA NI Consultant Committee's decision to recommend the department's proposed 2024/25 pay offer for consultants to its membership.

Nesbitt highlighted the role of Elective Care Centres in helping to reduce lengthy waiting lists during a visit to the Western Trust Elective Overnight Stay Centre on 24 July 2024.

On 1 August 2024, Nesbitt and Justice Minister Naomi Long launched a new Care Pathway and Model to provide streamlined access to Community Forensic Services.

On 21 August 2024, Nesbitt appointed Northern Ireland's first independent Autism Reviewer.

Nesbitt welcomed confirmation from the BMA Northern Ireland consultants committee that it will accept the pay offer tabled by the Department of Health on 23 August 2024.

On 27 August 2024, Nesbitt extended the appointment of Professor Siobhan O’Neill as the Mental Health Champion for Northern Ireland.

Nesbitt acknowledged the "immensely valuable" contribution made by internationally recruited staff in Health and Social Care in Northern Ireland on 29 August 2024.

On 11 September 2024, Nesbitt launched a new health and wellbeing framework for staff working within Health and Social Care in Northern Ireland.

On 8 April 2025, When asked about the possibility of introducing a Surgical Mesh Redress Scheme in Northern Ireland—similar to the one established in Scotland—Nesbitt described the situation as “unfortunate”, adding that he did not wish to act as a devolved government or “sow the seeds of division” among the thousands left disabled.

=== Resignation ===
Nesbitt resigned as Health Minister on 18 August 2026 following a clash with UUP leader Jon Burrows. The argument arose after Burrows spoke at a public meeting organized in opposition to the plan to transfer emergency general surgery operations to Antrim Area Hospital while converting Causeway Hospital into an elective surgery hub. At the meeting, Burrows expressed his opposition to the plan, directly contradicting the position of the Health Minister. He was the second high-profile resignation from the party within months, after another former leader Doug Beattie quit in May 2026, lashing out at Burrows' leadership.

== Leader of the Ulster Unionist Party ==
=== First term (2012–2017) ===
Mike Nesbitt was elected as UUP party leader on 31 March 2012. He defeated South Down assembly member John McCallister with a final vote tally of 536 votes to 129. Nesbitt said he wanted the UUP to become "the party of choice for every pro-union voter in Northern Ireland".

In April 2012, Nesbitt announced that he wanted to make history by being the first leader of his party to attend a Sinn Féin ard fheis. He said: "We should be going to all the conferences of the main parties, not just the Conservatives, Labour and Liberal Democrats."

Shortly after his election, Nesbitt received attention when he criticised the Alliance Party, a rival party of the UUP. He called them "unprincipled and driven by self-interest" and said they presided over "a catalogue of disasters". He challenged their commitment to its core policy of a shared future, saying "I can only imagine the disappointment of Alliance voters hoping for a principled stance on a shared future." An Alliance spokesman retorted, saying "In last year's election the public showed growing support for the Alliance Party. These criticisms come from a newly elected leader with little experience who leads a party that is in decline at a time when Alliance is in the ascendant. We will not, therefore, be responding to these silly remarks."

Nesbitt has tried to present a unionism which is more accommodating to aspects of Irish culture; for example he visited the Gaeltacht Quarter on the Falls Road, Belfast as the first step in trying to overturn the perception of some that his party is hostile to the Irish language.

Following the 2017 Northern Ireland Assembly election, Nesbitt announced his intention to step down as party leader, which he did on 8 April 2017.

=== 2024 leadership campaign ===
On 27 August 2024, following the resignation of Doug Beattie as UUP leader, the News Letter reported that Nesbitt would be the only candidate to succeed him and would run on a ticket of reforming the party. In a statement, UUP deputy leader Robbie Butler endorsed him saying he would lead a "revised and refreshed" leadership team offering "an exciting opportunity". Nesbitt will remain as Health Minister when he takes up the leadership role. On 30 August 2024, he was the only nominated candidate received by party officers.

Following the closure of nominations, Nesbitt held a press conference in which he paid tribute to the outgoing leader, stating that whenever he became leader last time Beattie's name "was the first on the list of the people I wanted to attract into the party". However, he refused to state whether Beattie had backed his nomination. Speaking about the current state of the UUP, Nesbitt said it "looks like what has happened is a badly split party."

=== Second term (2024–2026) ===
Nesbitt was to be ratified as leader at an extraordinary general meeting of the party on 14 September. He would go on to become the first person to have twice held the position of UUP leader. On 9 September 2024, the EGM was cancelled by party officers.

Nesbitt delivered his first speech as the new UUP leader remotely after he failed to recover from COVID-19 in time to attend the party's annual conference.

In July 2025, Nesbitt stated that he may step down as UUP leader before the next Northern Ireland Assembly election, with a decision expected by January 2026, which would trigger a leadership election. On 2 January 2026, Nesbitt announced his resignation as leader. In a statement, he said: “I retook the leadership to do a short-term job of getting the Party match fit for the forthcoming election campaign. That job is now done so the time is right to select the politician who will lead us into the May 2027 polls promoting our brand of confident, responsible unionism.” Nesbitt has said he will remain in post as health minister until the Assembly election, where he will also stand down as an MLA. He cited age as being a factor in his decision to not seek re-election, saying: "The next five-year mandate stretches to May 2032, the month I hope to celebrate my 75th birthday. That’s a commitment to fulltime politics I just do not feel I can make. And I would not be comfortably seeking a vote knowing that privately I was intending to retire during the mandate." On 2 January 2026, he announced he would stand down at the next Northern Ireland Assembly election.

== Personal life ==
Nesbitt was born in Belfast. He attended Campbell College, Belfast, and studied at Jesus College, Cambridge.

Upon giving up broadcasting, Nesbitt and his second wife Lynda Bryans set up their own independent media services company. Nesbitt worked for a public relations company between his careers at BBC Northern Ireland and UTV.

Nesbitt has four children. In April 2010, he revealed that he had two daughters from his previous marriage but has had no contact with them since his divorce from their mother.

Northern Ireland Assembly
Preceded by Simpson Gibson	Member of the Northern Ireland Assembly for Strangford; 2011–present	Incumbent
Party political offices
Preceded by Tom Elliott	Leader of the Ulster Unionist Party; 2012–2017	Succeeded by Robin Swann
Preceded by Doug Beattie	Leader of the Ulster Unionist Party; 2024 –	Succeeded by Incumbent
Political offices
Preceded by Robin Swann	Minister of Health; 2024 –	Succeeded by Incumbent
