= Tom Elliott, Baron Elliott of Ballinamallard =

Northern Irish politician life peer (born 1963)

The Right Honourable The Lord Elliott of Ballinamallard
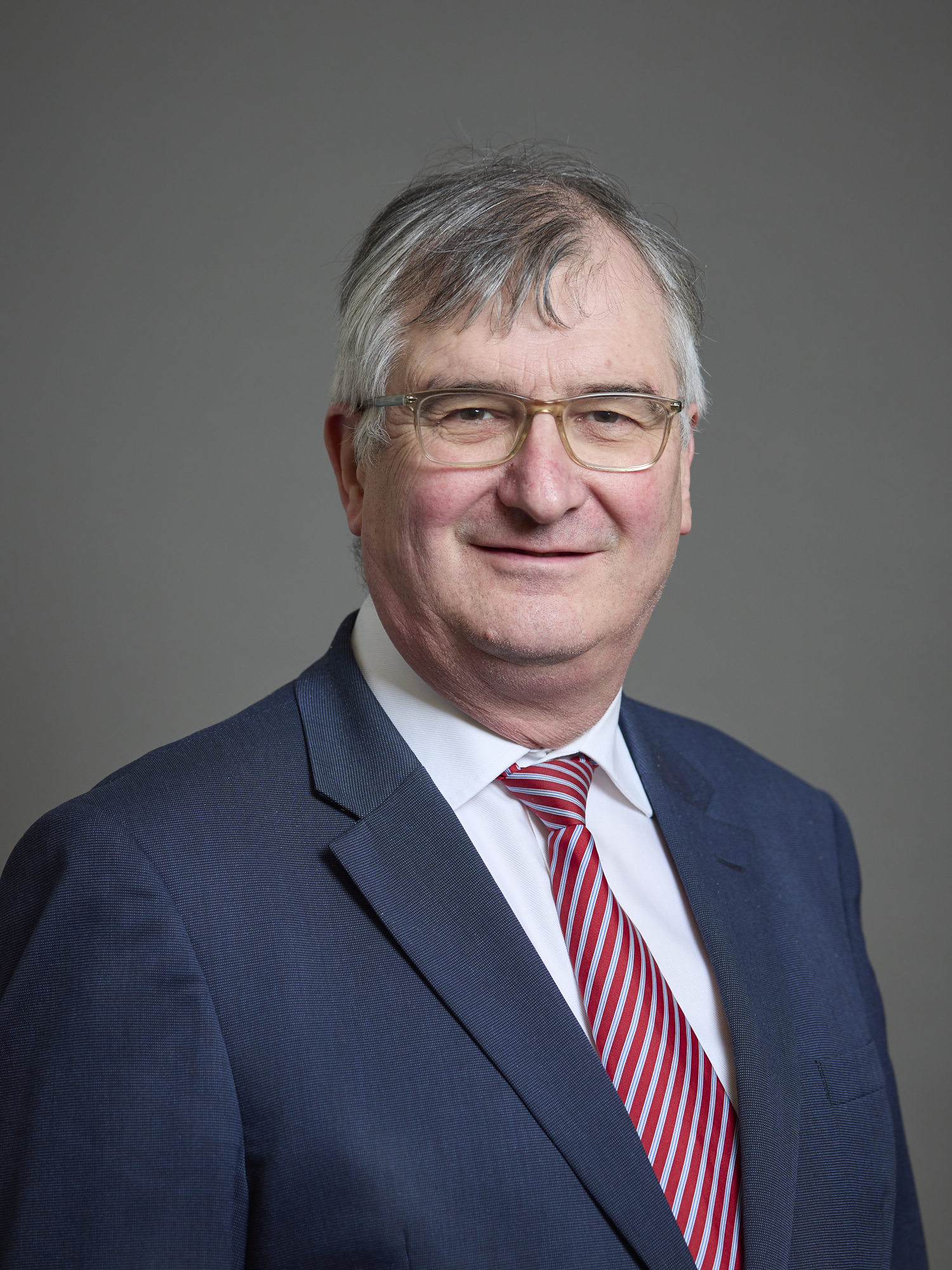
- Official portrait, 2025

Chairman of the Ulster Unionist Party
- Incumbent
- Assumed office 1 March 2025
- Leader: Mike Nesbitt; Jon Burrows
- Preceded by: Jill Macauley

Member of the House of Lords
- Lord Temporal
- Life peerage 16 August 2024

Member of the Legislative Assembly for Fermanagh and South Tyrone
- In office 5 May 2022 – 27 September 2024
- Preceded by: Rosemary Barton
- Succeeded by: Diana Armstrong
- In office 26 November 2003 – 27 June 2015
- Preceded by: Sam Foster
- Succeeded by: Neil Somerville

Member of Parliament for Fermanagh and South Tyrone
- In office 8 May 2015 – 3 May 2017
- Preceded by: Michelle Gildernew
- Succeeded by: Michelle Gildernew

Chair of the Committee for Agriculture, Environment and Rural Affairs
- In office 6 February 2024 – 27 September 2024
- Deputy: Declan McAleer
- Preceded by: Declan McAleer (2022)
- Succeeded by: Robbie Butler

Leader of the Ulster Unionist Party
- In office 22 September 2010 – 31 March 2012
- Deputy: Danny Kennedy; John McCallister
- Preceded by: Reg Empey
- Succeeded by: Mike Nesbitt

Member of Fermanagh District Council for Erne North
- In office 11 June 2001 – 9 May 2011
- Preceded by: Caldwell McClaughry
- Succeeded by: Rosemary Barton

Personal details
- Born: Thomas Beatty Elliott; 11 December 1963 (age 62) County Fermanagh, Northern Ireland
- Party: Ulster Unionist Party
- Spouse: Anne (m. 1989)
- Children: 2
- Education: Enniskillen College of Agriculture

Military service
- Allegiance: United Kingdom
- Branch/service: British Army
- Unit: Royal Irish Regiment; Ulster Defence Regiment
- Battles/wars: The Troubles

Thomas Beatty Elliott, Baron Elliott of Ballinamallard (born 11 December 1963), is a Northern Irish unionist politician and farmer serving as the Chairman of the Ulster Unionist Party since March 2025. He was the leader of the Ulster Unionist Party (UUP) from 2010 to 2012, and was a member of the Northern Ireland Assembly for Fermanagh and South Tyrone from 2022 until 2024, having previously served from 2003 to 2015. Elliott was Member of Parliament (MP) for Fermanagh and South Tyrone from 2015 to 2017 and was appointed to the House of Lords in 2024.

Elliott was a soldier in the Ulster Defence Regiment (UDR) from 1982 to 1992, and its successor the Royal Irish Regiment from 1992 to 1999. He backed a Leave vote in the 2016 Brexit referendum.

== Early life and education ==
Elliott was born on 11 December 1963 to John and Noreen Elliott, and received his primary and high school education in his native Ballinamallard in County Fermanagh. He earned a college certificate in agriculture from the Enniskillen College of Agriculture.

== Political career ==
Elliott has been an activist in the Ballinamallard Ward Ulster Unionist Party (UUP) committee for many years and is chairman of that committee. He has also been Honorary Secretary of the Fermanagh Divisional Unionist Association since 1998 and was chairman of the internal Ulster Unionist ad hoc Review Group for its duration.

In November 2003 he was elected as a member of the Northern Ireland Assembly representing Fermanagh and South Tyrone, a position to which he was re-elected in March 2007 and May 2011. In this role he served as Ulster Unionist Assembly spokesperson on Agriculture and Rural Affairs.

Elliott was selected as the UUP candidate for Fermanagh and South Tyrone UK Parliament constituency in the 2005 general election and came in third behind the Sinn Féin and DUP candidates. The UUP share of the vote fell from 34% in 2001 to 18% in 2005.

He was reselected for the 2010 general election, but stood down in favour of independent Unionist candidate Rodney Connor. With the DUP, TUV, UKIP and the Conservatives not contesting the seat.

=== Party leadership ===
In June 2010, Elliott announced his intention to run in the 2010 Ulster Unionist Party leadership election. He was elected although not without some controversy. It emerged shortly before the leadership election that a quarter of the UUP membership came from Fermanagh and South Tyrone, a disproportionately high figure. The Phoenix, an Irish political magazine, described Elliott as a "blast from the past" and that his election signified "a significant shift to the right" by the UUP.

The political editor of BBC Northern Ireland assessed that Elliott "slipped on a number of banana skins, most of his own making" and that "his charm did not transmit well over the airwaves."

When Elliott took over the leadership of the UUP in 2010, the party had recently received 102,361 votes at the May general election, which amounted to 15.2% of the vote. At the 2011 Assembly election, which was Elliott's first election as party leader, the UUP only received 87,531 votes which amounted to 13.2% of the vote and resulted in the party losing two of its MLAs. On the same day in 2011 the UUP also lost 16 of its Council seats.

In March 2012, he announced that he would step down as party leader.

When asked about his reasoning for standing down, he said that "some people have not given [him] a fair opportunity at developing and progressing many initiatives", going on to say that some of the hostility began immediately after he was selected as leader. He also accused some party members of making his job more difficult by briefing journalists.

His resignation triggered the 2012 Ulster Unionist Party leadership election, with Mike Nesbitt ultimately being chosen to succeed Elliott.

=== House of Commons ===
Elliott was selected as the UUP candidate for Fermanagh and South Tyrone at the 2015 general election. He successfully won back the seat for the party, defeating the incumbent MP, Michelle Gildernew of Sinn Féin, with 46.4 per cent of votes cast and a majority of 530. Elliott's win was one of two victories for the Ulster Unionist Party at the election and returned the UUP to the Commons for the first time in five years.

In the run-up to the 2017 general election, Elliott stated that the UUP was open to an electoral pact with the Democratic Unionist Party, but no such pact was agreed. He lost his seat to Gildernew at the election.

Elliott again contested Fermanagh and South Tyrone at the 2019 general election, coming only 57 votes short of retaking the seat, with 43.3% of votes cast.

=== Return to Stormont ===
Elliott was one of two UUP candidates for Fermanagh and South Tyrone at the 2022 Assembly election. He was elected on the second count, with 5,442 first-preference votes (10.2%). Elliott's election came at the expense of his running mate, the incumbent MLA, Rosemary Barton.

Elliott serves as the Ulster Unionist Party's agriculture spokesperson. In this role, he has raised concerns about the rise of rural crime in Northern Ireland and outlined that the UUP is "committed to challenging serious and organised crimes."

In August 2023, Elliott met with Dame Brenda King, Attorney General for Northern Ireland, to express concerns at the perceived imbalance in Troubles legacy cases being directed for inquests.

=== Peerage ===
Elliott was nominated for a life peerage in the 2024 Dissolution Honours. He was created Baron Elliott of Ballinamallard, of Ballinamallard in the County of Fermanagh, on 16 August 2024.

== Controversies ==
In 2010 when Elliott was campaigning to be party leader he stated publicly that he wouldn't attend gay pride parades or Gaelic Athletic Association matches, and these comments were interpreted as a move by him to appeal to more socially conservative elements in his party and a rebuke to his opponent Basil McCrea. Elliott later met with some gay rights groups and GAA figures in Northern Ireland.

After he was elected in the 2011 Assembly election, in his victory speech in Omagh Elliott referred to the Irish tricolour as a "flag of a foreign nation". When the audience started heckling him, he went on to describe nationalist supporters holding Irish flags as "the scum of Sinn Féin". Although initially refusing to retract his comment he later issued an apology "to all those good nationalists, republicans, even Sinn Fein voters who felt offended by it."

In August 2012, Elliott opposed money being spent on public inquests into people killed by the British Army and loyalist paramilitaries during the Troubles. He urged relatives of those killed by the IRA—whom he called "the real victims"—to band together to "choke the system up" and stop such inquests happening. He later clarified his remarks saying "At no stage did I suggest or infer that anyone killed in the Troubles, who was not murdered by the IRA, were 'not real victims'".

In February 2016, Elliott was criticised when he provided a statement to a court on behalf of a convicted benefit cheat. The judge in the case said he received a letter from a "senior politician" that spoke "glowingly" of the convicted man's work in the voluntary sector. Elliott denied it was a character reference. That same month, he was criticised by a judge for writing a testimonial for a man convicted for driving while disqualified. Although not naming Elliott in court he said he "crossed the line of the independence of the court" and "trespassed on the sentencing process."

Elliott settled a defamation case with Attorney General John Larkin by issuing a statement through his barrister and donating an undisclosed sum of money to charity. Under the terms of the settlement the following statement was read out by Elliott's senior counsel:

"On 20 April 2016, during the course of a live debate on the Stephen Nolan BBC Radio Ulster show, Mr Elliott made a number of statements which may have been taken to imply that the attorney general, John Larkin, had failed to discharge his professional duties impartially and with fairness. Mr Elliott wishes to confirm that he did not intend to impugn the integrity of Mr Larkin or for any such inferences to be taken from his statements. Mr Elliott regrets any embarrassment which this may have caused Mr Larkin."

== Personal life ==
Elliott married his wife Anne in 1989. They have two children, a son and a daughter, who were adopted at the age of two.

Elliott is a member of the Orange Order within Fermanagh, he has served as County Grand Master. He is also a member of the Royal Black Preceptory and the Kesh branch of the Apprentice Boys of Derry (ABOD).

Northern Ireland Assembly
Preceded by Sam Foster	Member of the Legislative Assembly for Fermanagh and South Tyrone; 2003–2015	Succeeded by Neil Somerville
Preceded by Rosemary Barton	Member of the Legislative Assembly for Fermanagh and South Tyrone; 2022–present	Incumbent
Party political offices
Preceded by Reg Empey	Leader of the Ulster Unionist Party; 2010–2012	Succeeded by Mike Nesbitt
Parliament of the United Kingdom
Preceded by Michelle Gildernew	Member of Parliament for Fermanagh and South Tyrone; 2015–2017	Succeeded by Michelle Gildernew
Orders of precedence in the United Kingdom
Preceded by The Lord Cryer	Gentlemen; Baron Elliott of Ballinamallard	Followed by The Lord Brady of Altrincham
