= Animal Hospital =

British television show from 1994-2004

- Presented by: Rolf Harris
- Country of origin: United Kingdom
- Original language: English
- No. of series: 19
- No. of episodes: 200+

Production
- Producer: BBC
- Running time: 30 minutes

Original release
- Network: BBC One
- Release: 29 August 1994 – 13 September 2004

Related
- Rolf's Animal Clinic (2012)

Animal Hospital is a British television show starring Australian singer and TV presenter Rolf Harris that ran on BBC One from 29 August 1994 to 13 September 2004. Other presenters included Lynda Bryans, Steve Knight, Mairi McHaffie, Rhodri Williams, Shauna Lowry and Jamie Darling who featured as reporters. Later episodes featured Phil Dixon. The series featured animal welfare stories from many RSPCA hospitals primarily in the UK.

== Locations ==
Harmsworth Animal Hospital in North London was the first of four RSPCA hospitals that opened their doors to allow the BBC to produce this factual television show which ran for over a decade. After Harmsworth, the series briefly moved to Hampden Veterinary Practice, in Aylesbury, Buckinghamshire before relocating in 1998 to the Putney Animal Hospital in South London, and then in 2002 to Salford Animal Hospital in Greater Manchester.

In 2015, the RSPCA announced that the animal hospital in Putney, South London would be closed. The animal hospitals at Sonderburg Road in Islington, North London, and Eccles New Road, Salford, Greater Manchester remain open.

== Australian version ==
The Australian version of Animal Hospital was aired on the Nine Network between 1996 and 2001. Like Easy Eats, the show's highlights dubbed as episodes edited in Animal Tales, a one hour show dedicated to animal welfare stories. It was broadcast on the Nine Network since 2019.
