= Jon Burrows =

Northern Ireland politician

Jon Burrows MLA
- Burrows in 2026

Leader of the Ulster Unionist Party
- Incumbent
- Assumed office 31 January 2026
- Deputy: Diana Armstrong
- Preceded by: Mike Nesbitt

Ulster Unionist Party spokesperson for Education
- Incumbent
- Assumed office 4 August 2025
- Leader: Mike Nesbitt; Himself
- Preceded by: Colin Crawford

Member of the Northern Ireland Assembly for North Antrim
- Incumbent
- Assumed office 4 August 2025
- Preceded by: Colin Crawford

Personal details
- Born: Jonathan Burrows; October 1977 (age 48–49) Bangor, Northern Ireland
- Party: Ulster Unionist Party (UUP)
- Occupation: Politician (2025–present); Police Service of Northern Ireland (PSNI; retired in 2021)

Jonathan Burrows MLA (born October 1977) is a Northern Irish politician who has served as Leader of the Ulster Unionist Party (UUP) since 31 January 2026. He has been a Member of the Legislative Assembly (MLA) for North Antrim since August 2025.

Burrows has extensive policing experience in Northern Ireland and throughout the United Kingdom. He served as a senior police officer in the Police Service of Northern Ireland (PSNI) until his retirement in 2021.

== Early life and education ==
Originally from Bangor, County Down, Burrows was educated at Bangor Grammar School before graduating from Ulster University with a BA (Hons) in Law and Government; and he also has a Master's in Criminal Justice (MSc) and a Master's in Law (LLM).

== Police career ==
Burrows followed his father, Colin, into a policing career. Colin Burrows retired from the PSNI in 2002 after 31 years of police service. He was awarded the Queens Police Medal in 1991.

Jon Burrows applied to the Royal Ulster Constabulary in 1995, but in his own words “flunked” the exam. Burrows later started his police career after completing his first degree and policed nationally as well as for the Police Service of Northern Ireland (PSNI) and served in a number of roles, including as Area Commander for Foyle and head of the internal discipline branch, until he retired on health grounds in 2021.

As part of his police career, Burrows headed up the team that delivered the policing around the Fleadh Cheoil in Derry in 2013. That event saw an Irish-speaking officer on duty at a mobile police station in Derry city centre along with other officers fluent in French and Spanish. Burrows said at the time that "this demonstrates how diverse and reflective the police service is of the community we serve." Burrows also led a crackdown on illegal republican parades - and in 2018 led an operation that arrested a masked colour party in Lurgan - the first operation of its kind.

== Political career ==
=== Member of the Northern Ireland Assembly (2025–present) ===
In July 2025, the Ulster Unionist Party (UUP) announced that Burrows had been selected to replace Colin Crawford as MLA for North Antrim. He is the party's Education Spokesperson.

=== Leader of the Ulster Unionist Party (2026–present) ===
On 8 January 2026, Burrows announced his candidacy for the leadership of the UUP in the 2026 leadership election. At the close of nominations on 15 January, Burrows was the only candidate nominated and was thus ratified as the party's next leader.

== Controversies ==
=== Sex discrimination tribunal ===
Jon Burrows was mentioned multiple times in an industrial tribunal brought by former Chief Superintendent Emma Bond, who alleged sex discrimination within the PSNI. Bond claimed that Burrows exhibited bias against her during internal investigations. Burrows expressed being "shocked" by these allegations, emphasizing his commitment to professionalism and fairness in his role.

=== Ormeau Road incident ===
Burrows was a vocal critic of the ombudsman's handling of the 2021 Ormeau Road incident, in which a PSNI officer was unlawfully suspended. He argued that the ombudsman failed to investigate the actions of senior officers involved, and instead pursued disciplinary charges against the suspended officer. Burrows contended that the suspension was politically motivated and not based on misconduct.
