= Ulster Unionist Party =

Political party in Northern Ireland

- Abbreviation: UUP
- Leader: Jon Burrows
- President: The Baroness Trimble
- Chairman: The Lord Elliott of Ballinamallard
- Deputy Leader: Diana Armstrong
- Founded: 3 March 1905; 121 years ago
- Preceded by: Irish Unionist Alliance (1891–1922)
- Headquarters: Strandtown Hall; 2–4 Belmont Road; Belfast; BT4 2AN
- Youth wing: Young Unionists
- Ideology: British unionism; Conservatism (British)
- Political position: Centre-right
- European affiliation: European Conservatives and Reformists Party (2005–2025)
- Great Britain affiliation: Conservative Party (1922–1972; 2009–2012)
- Colours: Blue
- Slogan: A Union of People
- House of Commons (NI seats): 1 / 18
- House of Lords: 3 / 796
- NI Assembly: 8 / 90
- Councillors in Northern Ireland: 51 / 462
- Councils led: 2 / 11

Website
- www.uup.org

The Ulster Unionist Party (UUP) is a unionist and conservative political party in Northern Ireland. The UUP is the third oldest political party in the United Kingdom, and the oldest political party in Ireland. The party was founded as the Ulster Unionist Council on 3 March 1905, emerging from the Irish Unionist Alliance in Ulster. Under Sir Edward Carson, it led unionist opposition to the Irish Home Rule movement. Following the partition of Ireland, it was the governing party of Northern Ireland between 1921 and 1972. It was supported by most unionist voters throughout the conflict known as the Troubles, during which time it was often referred to as the Official Unionist Party (OUP).

Under David Trimble, the party helped negotiate the Good Friday Agreement of 1998, which ended the conflict. Trimble served as the first First Minister of Northern Ireland from 1998 to 2002. However, it was overtaken as the largest unionist party in 2003 by the Democratic Unionist Party (DUP). As of 2022 it is the fourth-largest party in the Northern Ireland Assembly, after Sinn Féin, the DUP, and the Alliance Party. Since January 2026 the party has been led by Jon Burrows.

Between 1905 and 1972, its peers and MPs took the Conservative Party whip at Westminster, in effect functioning as the Northern Irish branch of the party. This arrangement came to an end in 1972 due to disagreements in relation to the Sunningdale Agreement. The two parties have remained institutionally separate ever since, with the exception of the 2009 to 2012 Ulster Conservatives and Unionists electoral alliance. The first-ever membership survey of the UUP, published in January 2019, suggested that 67% of its members were supportive of the Conservative Party.

== History ==
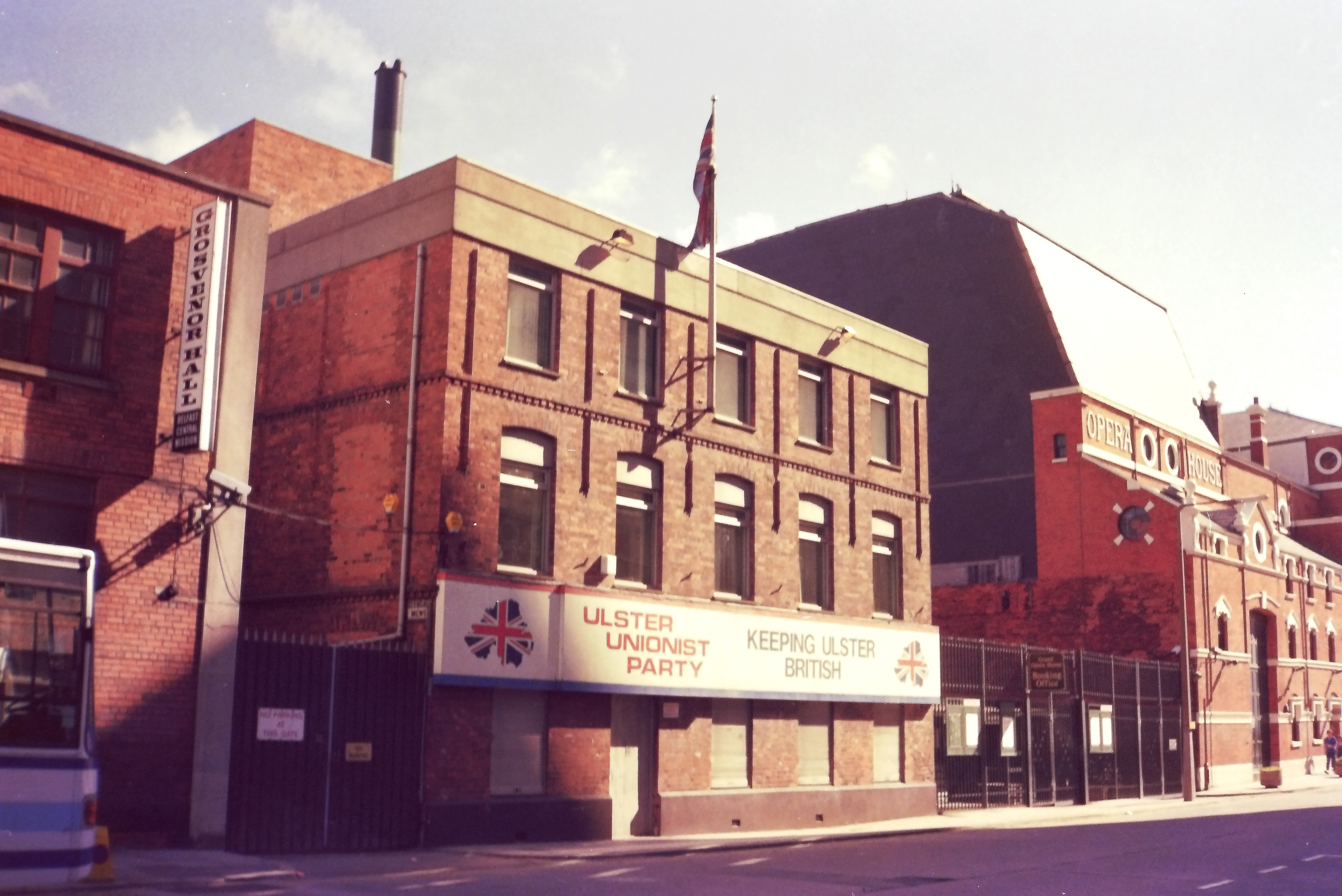
The party's former headquarters on Glengall Street, seen in 1990

The Ulster Unionist Party traces its formal existence back to the foundation of the Ulster Unionist Council in 1905. It is the oldest political party on the island of Ireland.

=== Background: 1886–1905 ===
Modern organised unionism emerged after William Ewart Gladstone's introduction in 1886 of the first of three Home Rule Bills in response to demands by the Irish Parliamentary Party. In 1891, the Irish Conservative Party came to an end, merged into a new Irish Unionist Alliance (IUA) which also included the Irish Liberal Unionists, the latter having split from the Liberal Party over the issue of home rule. While usually dominated by unionists from Ulster, the IUA was often led by southern unionists. There were also some eighty members of the House of Lords who affiliated themselves with the IUA.

The Ulster Defence Union was also formed on 17 March 1893 to oppose the Liberal government's plans for the Government of Ireland Bill 1893.

Although most unionist support was based in Ulster, especially within areas that later became Northern Ireland, in the late 19th and early 20th century there were unionist enclaves throughout all of Ireland. Unionists in Dublin and County Wicklow and in parts of County Cork were particularly influential.

=== 1905–1921 ===
In September 1904, the Conservative government of Arthur Balfour published proposals for limited devolution to Ireland which would not amount to home rule. Coming from Conservatives, these led to great alarm among Irish unionists; in March 1905, the Ulster Unionist Council, which later became the Ulster Unionist Party, was formed as a co-ordinating organisation for a new form of local political activity. It largely subsumed the Ulster Defence Union.

From the beginning, the new organization had a strong association with the Orange Order, a Protestant fraternal organisation. The original composition of the Ulster Unionist Council was 25% Orange delegates; however, this proportion was reduced through the years. The initial leadership of the Ulster unionists all came from outside what would later become Northern Ireland. In particular, from 1905 Colonel Saunderson was simultaneously leader of the Irish Unionist Alliance MPs and leader of the Ulster Unionist Council in Belfast. In 1906 he was succeeded in both roles by Walter Hume Long, a Dublin MP. Another Dubliner, Sir Edward Carson, one of the two Irish Unionist Alliance MPs for the Dublin University constituency, and Lord Midleton were also southern unionists active in both. Carson went on to become the first leader of the Ulster Unionist Party, from 1910. Throughout his years of leadership, he fought a sustained campaign against Irish Home Rule, including taking the lead in the formation of the Ulster Volunteers at the onset of the Home Rule Crisis in 1912.

In 1912, at Westminster the Home Rule Crisis led to the Liberal Unionist Party merging with the Conservatives, thus giving rise to the current name of the Conservative and Unionist Party, to which the Ulster Unionist Party was formally linked, to varying degrees, until 1985.

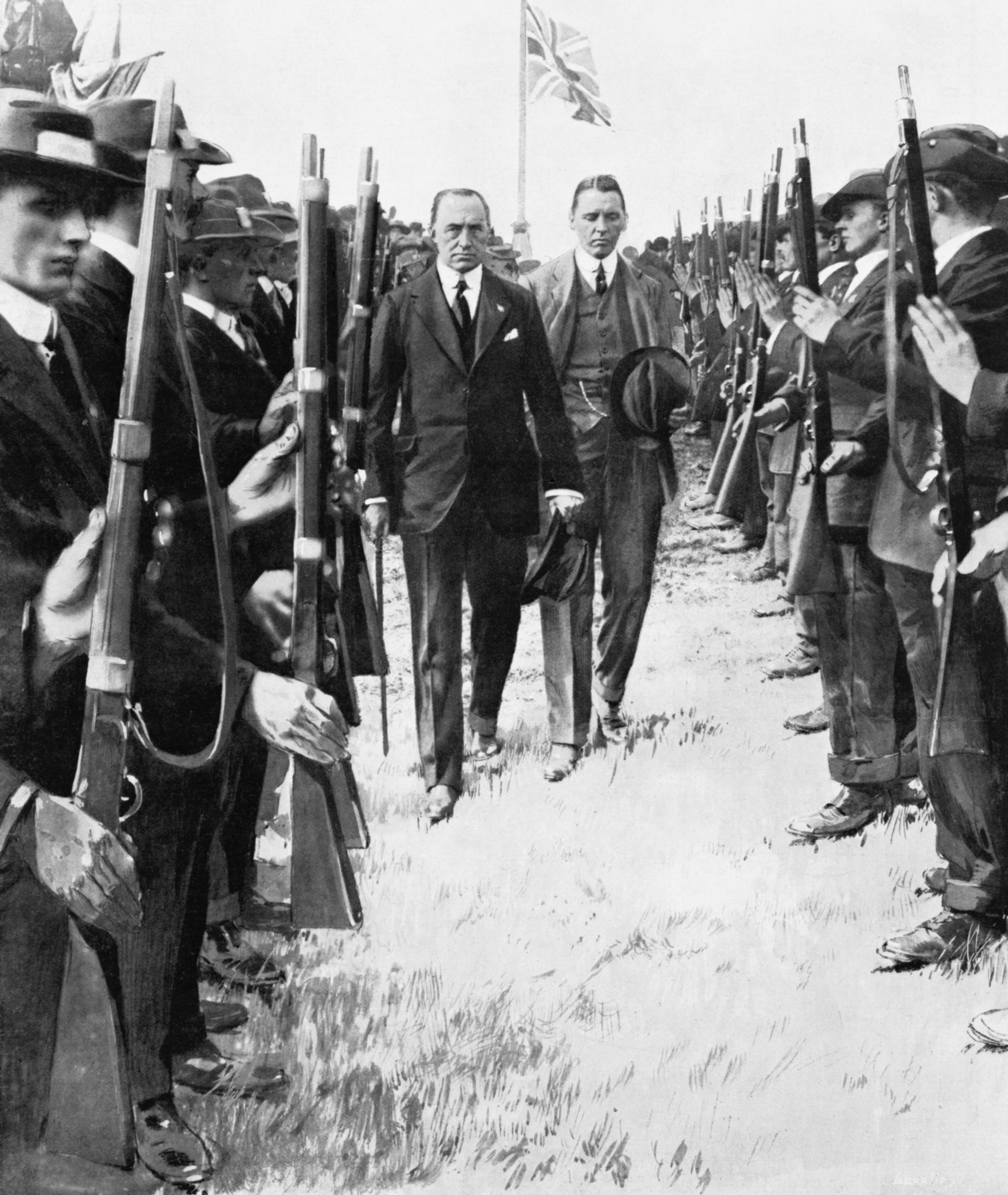
Carson inspecting the UVF, F. E. Smith walking behind him, pre-1914

At the 1918 general election, Carson switched constituencies from Dublin University to Belfast Duncairn.

After the Irish Convention of 1917–1918 failed to reach an understanding on home rule, and even more after the Partition of Ireland under the Government of Ireland Act 1920, Irish unionism in effect split. Many southern unionist politicians quickly became reconciled with the new Irish Free State, sitting in its Senate or joining its political parties, while in Northern Ireland the existence of a separate Ulster Unionist Party became entrenched as it took control of the new Government of Northern Ireland, established in 1921.

Carson strongly opposed the partition of Ireland and the end of unionism as an all-Ireland political force, so he refused the opportunity to be Prime Minister of Northern Ireland or even to sit in the Northern Ireland House of Commons, citing a lack of connection with the new province. The leadership of the UUP and, subsequently, Northern Ireland, was taken by Sir James Craig.

=== The Stormont era: linked with the Conservative Party ===
==== 1920–1963 ====
Until almost the very end of its period of power in Northern Ireland, the UUP was led by a combination of landed gentry (The 1st Viscount Brookeborough, Hugh MacDowell Pollock and James Chichester-Clark), aristocracy (Terence O'Neill) and gentrified industrial magnates (The 1st Viscount Craigavon and J. M. Andrews – nephew of The 1st Viscount Pirrie). Only its last Prime Minister, Brian Faulkner, was from a middle-class background. During this era, all but 11 of the 149 UUP Stormont MPs were members of the Orange Order, as were all Prime Ministers.

Sir James Craig, who in 1927 was created Viscount Craigavon, led the government of Northern Ireland from its inception until his death in November 1940 and is buried with his wife by the east wing of Parliament Buildings at Stormont. His successor, J. M. Andrews, was heavily criticised for appointing octogenarian veterans of Lord Craigavon's administration to his cabinet. His government was also believed to be more interested in protecting the statue of Carson at the Stormont Estate than the citizens of Belfast during the Belfast Blitz. A backbench revolt in 1943 resulted in his resignation and replacement by Sir Basil Brooke (later Viscount Brookeborough), although Andrews was recognised as leader of the party until 1946.

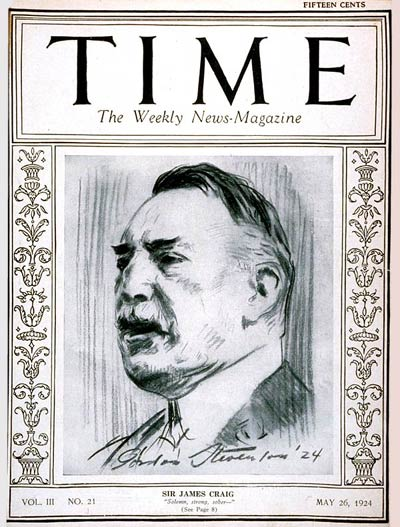
Craig appeared on the front cover of Time Magazine on 26 May 1924

Lord Brookeborough, despite having felt that Craigavon had held on to power for too long, was Prime Minister for one year longer. During this time he was on more than one occasion called to meetings of the Grand Orange Lodge of Ireland to explain his actions, most notably following the 1947 Education Act which made the government responsible for the payment of National Insurance contributions of teachers in Catholic Church-controlled schools. Ian Paisley called for Brookeborough's resignation in 1953 when he refused to sack Brian Maginess and Clarence Graham, who had given speeches supporting re-admitting Catholics to the UUP. He retired in 1963 and was replaced by Terence O'Neill, who emerged ahead of other candidates, Jack Andrews and Faulkner.

==== 1963–1972 ====
In the 1960s, identifying with the civil rights movement of Martin Luther King Jr. and encouraged by attempts at reform under O'Neill, various organisations campaigned for civil rights, calling for changes to the system for allocating public housing and the voting system for the local government franchise, which was restricted to (disproportionately Protestant) rate payers. O'Neill had pushed through some reforms but in the process the Ulster Unionists became strongly divided. At the 1969 Stormont general election UUP candidates stood on both pro- and anti-O'Neill platforms. Several independent pro-O'Neill unionists challenging his critics, while the Protestant Unionist Party of Ian Paisley mounted a hard-line challenge. The result proved inconclusive for O'Neill, who resigned a short time later. His resignation was probably caused by a speech of James Chichester-Clark who stated that he disagreed with the timing, but not the principle, of universal suffrage at local elections.

Chichester-Clark won the leadership election to replace O'Neill and swiftly moved to implement many of O'Neill's reforms. Civil disorder continued to mount, culminating in August 1969 when Catholic Bogside residents clashed with the Royal Ulster Constabulary in Derry because of an Apprentice Boys of Derry march, sparking days of riots. Early in 1971, Chichester-Clark flew to London to request further military aid following the 1971 Scottish soldiers' killings. When this was all but refused, he resigned to be replaced by Brian Faulkner.

Faulkner's government struggled though 1971 and into 1972. After Bloody Sunday, the British Government threatened to remove control of the security forces from the devolved government. Faulkner reacted by resigning with his entire cabinet, and the British Government suspended, and eventually abolished, the Northern Ireland Parliament, replacing it with Direct Rule.

The liberal unionist group, the New Ulster Movement, which had advocated the policies of Terence O'Neill, left and formed the Alliance Party of Northern Ireland in April 1970, while the emergence of Ian Paisley's Protestant Unionist Party continued to draw off some working-class and more loyalist support.

=== 1972–1995 ===
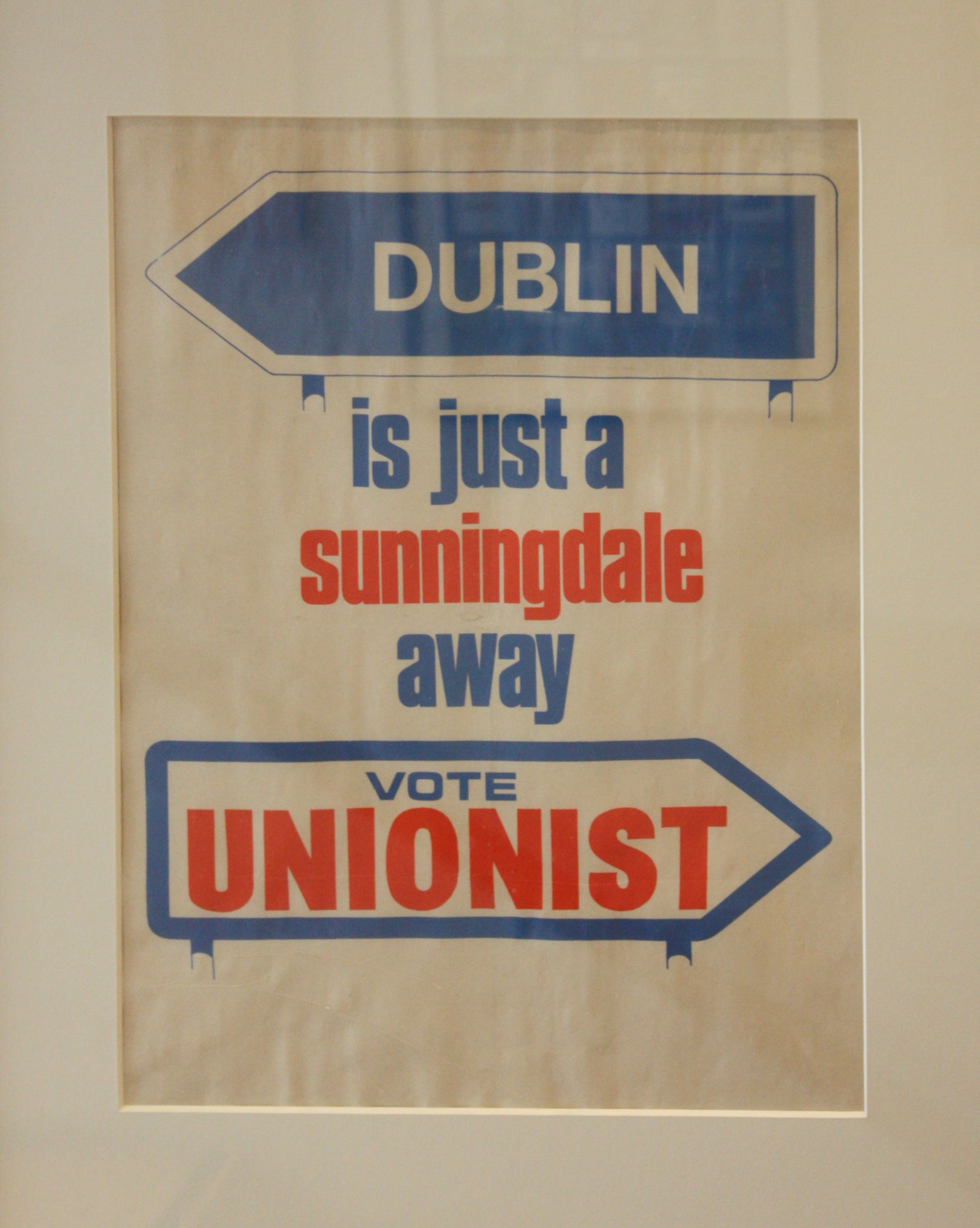
Ulster Unionist Party, 1974. Troubled Images Exhibition, Linen Hall Library, Belfast, August 2010

In June 1973 the UUP won a majority of seats in the new Northern Ireland Assembly, but the party was divided on policy. The Sunningdale Agreement, which led to the formation of a power-sharing Executive under Ulster Unionist leader Brian Faulkner, ruptured the party. In the 1973 elections to the Executive the party found itself divided, a division that did not formally end until January 1974 with the triumph of the anti-Sunningdale faction. Faulkner was then overthrown, and he set up the Unionist Party of Northern Ireland (UPNI). The Ulster Unionists were then led by Harry West from 1974 until 1979. In the February 1974 general election, the party participated in the United Ulster Unionist Council (UUUC) with Vanguard and the Democratic Unionist Party, successor to the Protestant Unionist Party. The result was that the UUUC won 11 out of 12 parliamentary seats in Northern Ireland on a fiercely anti-Sunningdale platform, although they barely won 50% of the overall popular vote. This result was a fatal blow for the Executive, which soon collapsed.

Up until 1972 the UUP sat with the Conservative Party at Westminster, traditionally taking the Conservative parliamentary whip. To all intents and purposes the party functioned as the Northern Ireland branch of the Conservative Party. In 1972, in protest over the prorogation of the Parliament of Northern Ireland, the Westminster Ulster Unionist MPs withdrew from the alliance. The party remained affiliated to the National Union of Conservative and Unionist Associations, but in 1985, withdrew from it as well, in protest over the Anglo-Irish Agreement. Subsequently, the Conservative Party has organised separately in Northern Ireland, with little electoral success.

Under West's leadership, the party recruited Enoch Powell, who became Ulster Unionist MP for South Down in October 1974 after defecting from the Conservatives. Powell advocated a policy of 'integration', whereby Northern Ireland would be administered as an integral part of the United Kingdom. This policy divided both the Ulster Unionists and the wider unionist movement, as Powell's ideas conflicted with those supporting a restoration of devolved government to Northern Ireland. The party also made gains upon the break-up of the Vanguard Party and its merger back into the Ulster Unionists. The separate United Ulster Unionist Party (UUUP) emerged from the remains of Vanguard but folded in the early 1980s, as did the UPNI. In both cases the main beneficiaries of this were the Ulster Unionists, now under the leadership of James Molyneaux (1979–95).

=== 1995–2005: David Trimble ===
David Trimble's support for the Belfast Agreement caused a rupture within the party into pro-agreement and anti-agreement factions. Trimble served as the first First Minister of Northern Ireland in the power-sharing administration created under the Belfast Agreement.

The Nobel Peace Prize 1998 was awarded jointly to Trimble and John Hume "for their efforts to find a peaceful solution to the conflict in Northern Ireland".

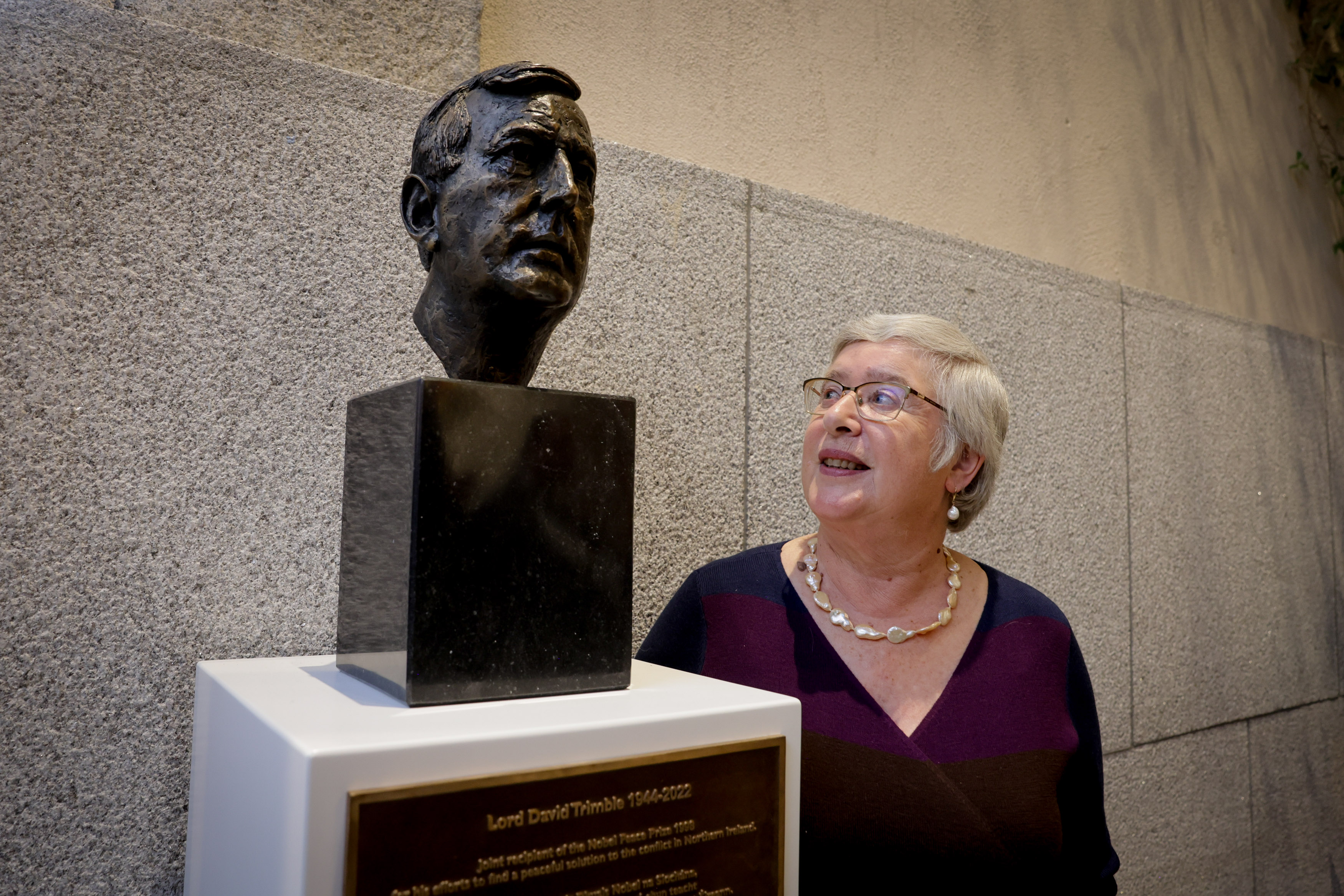
Party president Lady Trimble stands beside a bust of her husband, Nobel Peace Prize laureate Lord Trimble, at Leinster House in 2023

Unusually for a unionist party, the UUP had a Catholic MLA in the Northern Ireland Assembly, Sir John Gorman until the 2003 election. In March 2005, the Orange Order voted to end its official links with the UUP. Trimble faced down Orange Order critics who tried to suspend him for his attendance at a Catholic funeral for a young boy killed by the Real IRA in the Omagh bombing. In a sign of unity, Trimble and President of Ireland Mary McAleese walked into the church together.

In the 2001 general election, the Ulster Unionists lost a number of seats belonging to UUP stalwarts; for example, John Taylor, the former deputy leader of the party, lost his seat of Strangford to Iris Robinson.

The party held six seats at Westminster immediately before the 2005 general election, down from seven after the previous general election following the defection of Jeffrey Donaldson in 2004. The election resulted in the loss of five of their six seats. The only seat won by an Ulster Unionist was North Down, by Sylvia Hermon, who had won the seat in the 2001 general election from Robert McCartney of UK Unionist Party. David Trimble himself lost his seat in Upper Bann and resigned as party leader soon after. The ensuing leadership election was won by Reg Empey. On 2 June 2006, Trimble was made Lord Trimble.

=== 2005–2010: Reg Empey ===
In May 2006 UUP leader Empey attempted to create a new assembly group that would have included Progressive Unionist Party (PUP) leader David Ervine. The PUP is the political wing of the illegal Ulster Volunteer Force (UVF). Many in the UUP, including the last remaining MP, Sylvia Hermon, were opposed to the move. The link was in the form of a new group called the 'Ulster Unionist Party Assembly Group' whose membership was the 24 UUP MLAs and Ervine. Empey justified the link by stating that under the d'Hondt method for allocating ministers in the Assembly, the new group would take a seat in the Executive from Sinn Féin.

Following a request for a ruling from the DUP's Peter Robinson, the Speaker ruled that the UUPAG was not a political party within the meaning of the Political Parties, Elections and Referendums Act 2000.

The party lost 9 seats in the 2007 Northern Ireland Assembly election, retaining 18 MLAs. Empey was the only leader of one of the four main parties not to be re-elected on first preference votes alone in the Assembly elections of March 2007.

In July 2008, the UUP and Conservative Party announced that a joint working group had been established to examine closer ties. On 26 February 2009, the Ulster Unionist Executive and area council of Northern Ireland Conservatives agreed to field joint candidates in future elections to the House of Commons and European Parliament under the name "Ulster Conservatives and Unionists – New Force" (UCUNF). The agreement meant that Ulster Unionist MPs could have sat in a Conservative Government, renewing the relationship that had broken down in 1974 over the Sunningdale Agreement and in 1985 over the Anglo-Irish Agreement. The UUP's sole remaining MP at the time, Sylvia Hermon, opposed the agreement, stating she would not be willing to stand under the UCUNF banner.

In February 2010, Hermon confirmed that she would not be seeking a nomination as a UCUNF candidate for the forthcoming general election. On 25 March 2010, she formally resigned from the party and announced that she would be standing as an independent candidate at the general election. As a result, the UUP were left without representation in the House of Commons for the first time since the party's creation. At the 2010 general election, UCUNF won no seats in Northern Ireland (while Hermon won hers as an independent). The UCUNF label was not used again.

=== 2010–2012: Tom Elliott ===
Following the election, Empey resigned as leader. He was replaced by Tom Elliott as party leader in the subsequent leadership election. During the leadership election, it emerged that a quarter of the UUP membership came from Fermanagh and South Tyrone, the constituency of Elliott. The Dublin-based political magazine, the Phoenix, described Elliott as a "blast from the past" and said that his election signified "a significant shift to the right" by the UUP. Shortly after his election, three 2010 general election candidates resigned: Harry Hamilton, Paula Bradshaw and Trevor Ringland. Bradshaw and Hamilton subsequently joined the Alliance Party.

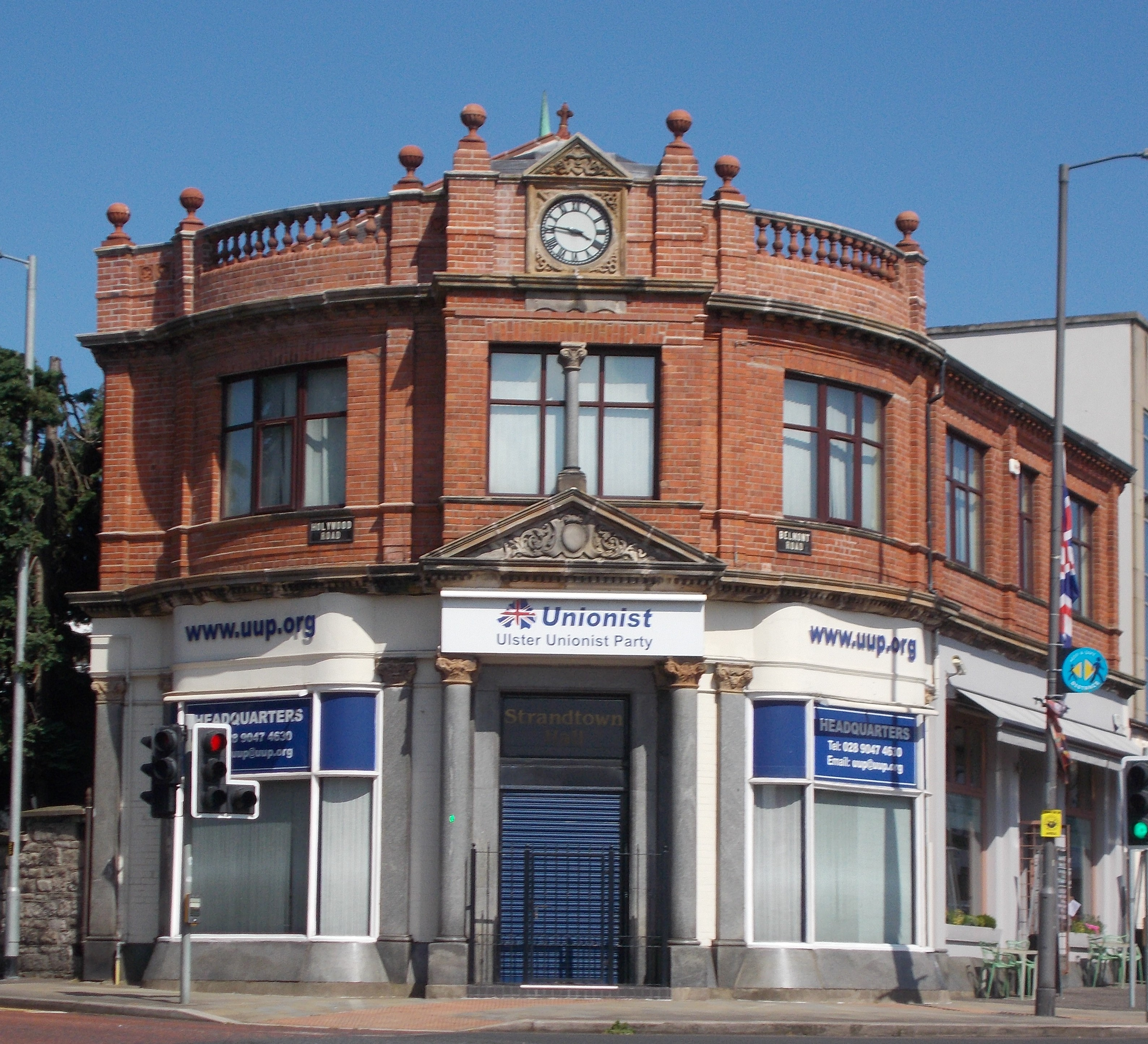
UUP Headquarters – Strandtown Hall, Belfast

The party lost two seats in the 2011 Assembly elections and won fewer votes than the nationalist Social Democratic and Labour Party (SDLP) (although it won more seats than the SDLP). Two of its candidates, Bill Manwaring and Lesley Macaulay, subsequently joined the Conservative Party. In the 2011 local elections it lost seats to the Alliance Party east of the Bann and was also overtaken by them on Belfast City Council.

Tom Elliott was criticised for comments he made in his victory speech where he described elements of Sinn Féin as "scum". Elliott resigned in March 2012 saying some people had not given him a 'fair opportunity' to develop and progress many party initiatives. Mike Nesbitt was elected leader on 31 March 2012, beating John McCallister, by 536 votes to 129.

=== 2012–2017: Mike Nesbitt ===
In the 2014 European election Jim Nicholson held his MEP seat, although his percentage of the vote decreased to 13.3% (−3.8%). The party gained 15 seats in the local elections that same day. They polled 16.1% (+0.9%), making it the only party to increase its vote share.

At the 2015 general election, the UUP returned to Westminster, gaining the South Antrim seat from the DUP and Fermanagh & South Tyrone (where they had an electoral pact with the DUP not standing) from Sinn Féin.

In 2016, the UUP and the SDLP decided not to accept the seats on the Northern Ireland Executive to which they would have been entitled and to form an official opposition to the executive. This marked the first time that a devolved government in Northern Ireland did not include the UUP.

In the 2016 European Union referendum the UUP was the only unionist party to support the remain campaign, the UUP Executive passing a motion on 5 March 2016 that the party "believes that on balance Northern Ireland is better remaining in the European Union, with the UK Government pressing for further reform and a return to the founding principle of free trade, not greater political union. The Party respects that individual members may vote for withdrawal."

Nesbitt would lead the UUP again for second time from 2024–2026.

=== 2017–2019: Robin Swann ===
At the 2017 general election the UUP lost both of its Commons seats, losing South Antrim to the DUP and Fermanagh & South Tyrone to Sinn Féin. The party polled 10.3% (−5.7%) and failed to take any other seats.

In the 2019 local elections the UUP polled 14.1% (−2.0) winning 75 council seats, 13 fewer than in 2014.

They lost their single MEP at the 2019 European Parliament elections following the retirement of Jim Nicholson. Danny Kennedy stood as the UUP candidate polling 9.3% (−4.0%). Steve Aiken succeeded Robin Swann as leader in November 2019.

=== 2019–2021: Steve Aiken ===
The party increased its vote share to 11.7% (+1.4%) in the 2019 general election, but failed to re-gain a seat. Their best result was in Fermanagh and South Tyrone, where Tom Elliott lost to Sinn Féin by 57 votes.

=== 2021–2024: Doug Beattie ===
Steve Aiken resigned on 8 May 2021, and Doug Beattie was elected as leader on 17 May 2021. Beattie, a former soldier, is perceived as a progressive unionist, and it was predicted that following his election as leader, the party would reclaim some of the centre ground that they had lost to the Alliance Party.

After Beattie became leader, a number of new members joined the party including former Belfast PUP councillor Julie-Anne Corr-Johnston, Derry and Strabane DUP councillor Ryan McCready, former Independent Irish Senator Ian Marshall, Belfast Alliance Party councillor Carole Howard and Belfast PUP councillor John Kyle.

In October 2021, Newry and Mourne UUP councillor Harold McKee resigned from the party because of Beattie's promotion of 'liberal values'.

In January 2022, Beattie made what some saw as a misogynistic joke about DAERA minister Edwin Poots and his wife. After this, it was found that he had made other controversial jokes on social media, before entering politics, and he made a statement apologising.

The party contested all 18 constituencies in the 2022 Assembly election. They received 96,390 votes, 11.2% of the total, down 1.7% from the 2017 Assembly election. They had 9 MLAs elected, down 1 from 2017 after Roy Beggs Jr lost his seat in East Antrim to Alliance.

In the 2023 local elections, Beattie characterised the election as a 'choice between delivery or dysfunction'. The UUP ran 101 candidates across the 11 councils, with a manifesto pledging 'city and growth deals', the appointment of 'prompt payment champions' to each council, 'below inflation rate rises' and the devolution of regeneration powers to councils. They received 81,282 votes, 10.9% of the total, down 3.2% from the 2019 local elections. The party had 54 councillors elected, down 21 from 2019.

Following the losses for the UUP in the 2023 local elections, Beattie said that unionism was always likely to "take a hit across the board" due to Sinn Féin's gains.

Ahead of the 2024 general election, the UUP 'absolutely' ruled out an electoral pact with the DUP. Robbie Butler, the UUP's deputy leader, said that politics is about "maximising and having confidence in your own voice." In January 2024, it was announced that Iraq veteran Tim Collins had joined the UUP and been selected as the party's prospective parliamentary candidate for the North Down constituency.

In May 2024, Antrim and Newtownabbey Councillor, Paul Michael quit the party following the decision to replace Robin Swann with Mike Nesbitt as Health Minister.

The UUP returned to Westminster following the 2024 general election and Robin Swann's victory in South Antrim. Beattie announced he was stepping down as leader in August 2024 and was succeeded by former leader Mike Nesbitt.

=== 2024–2026: Mike Nesbitt ===
The UUP's North Antrim MLA, Colin Crawford, announced in June 2025 that he was standing down following an internal disagreement over the party's response to the 2025 Northern Ireland riots. In July 2025, Andy Allen resigned as Ulster Unionist Chief Whip. Robbie Butler became Chief Whip.

Nesbitt supported the launch of the UUP's LGBT wing, Pride in the Union, in 2024.

Nesbitt succeeded in changing party structures with the adoption of a new Constitution on 29 March 2025, improving the UUP's finances and employing a full complement of staff.

=== 2026–present: Jon Burrows and Diana Armstrong ===
Following the adoption of a new Constitution on 29 March 2025, the Leader and Deputy Leader are now jointly-elected. On 31 January 2026, Jon Burrows and Diana Armstrong will be jointly-elected as Leader and Deputy Leader of the UUP.

Burrows retained Nesbitt as Health Minister and appointed Armstrong as Chief Whip, replacing Butler.

On 31 May 2026, Doug Beattie quit the Ulster Unionist Party, saying he no longer believes the party reflects a "moderate and progressive outlook" and that it was clear his membership is no longer "tenable".

== Leaders ==
Image	Name	Tenure		Notes
	Colonel Edward Saunderson	1905	1906	Also leader of the Irish Unionist Party
	Walter Hume Long	1906	1910	Also leader of the Irish Unionist Party
	Sir Edward Carson	1910	1921	Also leader of the Irish Unionist Party
	The Viscount Craigavon	1921	1940	1st Prime Minister of Northern Ireland
	J. M. Andrews	1940	1943	2nd Prime Minister of Northern Ireland
	The Viscount Brookeborough	1943	1963	3rd Prime Minister of Northern Ireland
	Captain Terence O'Neill	1963	1969	4th Prime Minister of Northern Ireland
	James Chichester-Clark	1969	1971	5th Prime Minister of Northern Ireland
	Brian Faulkner	1971	1974	6th and final Prime Minister of Northern Ireland (1971–1972); 1st and final Chief Executive of Northern Ireland (1974)
	Harry West	1974	1979	
	James Molyneaux	1979	1995	
	David Trimble	1995	2005	1st First Minister of Northern Ireland (1998–2001; 2001–2002)
	Sir Reg Empey	2005	2010	Acting First Minister of Northern Ireland (2001); Minister of Enterprise, Trade and Investment (1998–2002); Minister for Employment and Learning (2007–2010)
	Tom Elliott	2010	2012	
	Mike Nesbitt	2012	2017	Opposition (2016–17)
	Robin Swann	2017	2019	Minister of Health (2020–22; 2024)
	Steve Aiken OBE	2019	2021	
	Doug Beattie MC	2021	2024	
	Mike Nesbitt	2024	2026	Minister of Health (2024–2026)
	Jon Burrows QPM	2026	present	

== Deputy Leaders ==
The UUP's Deputy Leader position was created following the adoption of a new Constitution on 29 March 2025. The UUP's first Deputy Leader was nominated and approved on 5 July 2025. Prior to the creation of the position, the person who was Deputy Leader of the Assembly Group or Parliamentary Party was often incorrectly called the UUP's Deputy Leader.

Image	Name	Tenure		Notes
	Robbie Butler	2025	2026	Chairperson of Committee for Agriculture, Environment and Rural Affairs (2024–2026); Deputy Leader of the Assembly Group (2021–present) Minister of Health (2026–present)
	Diana Armstrong	2026	present	Chief Whip (2026–present) Chairperson of Committee for Agriculture, Environment and Rural Affairs (2026–present)

== Structure ==
=== Youth wing ===
The UUP's youth organisation is the Young Unionists, which was re-constituted by young activists in March 2004 as a rebrand of the Ulster Young Unionist Council. The UYUC was formed in 1946 and disbanded twice, in 1974 and 2004. There are Young Unionist student associations in Queen's University Belfast and Ulster University.

=== Women's wing ===
The Ulster Women’s Unionist Council was established in 1911 to encourage women to development and contribute politically and to ensure representation of women at the highest levels within the party. The Dame Dehra Parker Programme has successfully developed the skills and increased the confidence of female members.

=== Overseas wing ===
The Westminster Ulster Unionist Association is open to any associate member of the Party residing outside Northern Ireland. It was established to promote objectives of the Party generally, and in particular to maintain an efficient Party organisation in London. The wing was previously called the Westminster Unionist Association but was renamed following the adoption of a new Constitution on 29 March 2025. The wing relaunched on 3 June 2025.

=== LGBT wing ===
The UUP formed a LGBT+ organisation in 2024 called Pride in the Union, led by the late David Trimble's daughter Vicky Trimble. The UUP have participated in Pride events for many years. Jeff Dudgeon, who campaigned successfully for the decriminalisation of homosexuality, is a member.

== Representatives ==
=== Parliament of the United Kingdom ===
Members of the House of Commons as elected in July 2024:

Portrait	Name	Since	Notes
	Robin Swann	2024	MP for South Antrim; Former MLA for North Antrim (2011–2024); Former Leader of the UUP (2017–2019); Former Chief Whip of the UUP (2012–2017)

The party stood candidates in 17 of the 18 Northern Ireland constituencies in the 2024 election. The party announced it would not be standing a candidate in North Belfast.

Members of the House of Lords as June 2024:

Portrait	Name	Since	Notes
	The Lord Empey	2011	Former MLA for Belfast East (1998–2011); Former Leader of the UUP (2005–2010) Former Chairman of the UUP (2012–2019)
	The Lord Rogan	1999	Deputy Speaker of the House of Lords (2018–present); Leader of the UUP in the House of Lords (2009–present); Former President of the UUP (2004–2006)
	The Lord Elliott of Ballinamallard	2024	Chair of the UUP (2024–present) Former Chair of the Committee for Agriculture, Environment and Rural Affairs (2024) Former MP for Fermanagh and South Tyrone (2015–2017) Former Leader of the UUP (2010–2012) Former MLA for Fermanagh and South Tyrone (2003–2015; 2022–2024)

=== Northern Ireland Assembly ===
Members of the Northern Ireland Assembly as of August 2026:

Portrait	Name	Since	Notes
	Steve Aiken	2016	MLA for South Antrim; Deputy Speaker of the Northern Ireland Assembly (2024–present); Former Leader of the UUP (2019–2021)
	Andy Allen	2015	MLA for Belfast East
	Diana Armstrong	2024	MLA for Fermanagh and South Tyrone; Chair of the Committee for Agriculture, Environment and Rural Affairs (2024–present) Deputy Leader of the UUP (2026–present) Chief Whip of the UUP (2026–present)
	Jon Burrows	2025	MLA for North Antrim; Leader of the UUP (2026–present)
	Robbie Butler	2016	MLA for Lagan Valley; Minister for Health (2026–present); Chair of the Committee for Agriculture, Environment and Rural Affairs (2024–2026) Former Deputy Leader of the UUP (2025–2026) Former Deputy Leader of the Assembly Group (2021–2026)
	Alan Chambers	2016	MLA for North Down Chair of the Audit Committee (2024–present)
	Mike Nesbitt	2011	MLA for Strangford Minister of Health (2024–2026) Former Leader of the UUP (2012–2017; 2024–2026)
	John Stewart	2017	MLA for East Antrim Deputy Chair of the Committee for Infrastructure (2024–present)

=== Northern Ireland Executive Ministers ===
Portrait	Name	Since	Portfolio
	Robbie Butler	2026	Minister of Health

=== Party spokespersons ===
The current Party spokespersons include:

Responsibility	Name
Chief Whip	Diana Armstrong
Executive Office	John Stewart
Agriculture, Environment and Rural Affairs	Robbie Butler
Communities	Andy Allen
Education	Jon Burrows
Economy	Diana Armstrong
Finance	Steve Aiken
Health	Alan Chambers
Infrastructure	John Stewart
Justice	

=== Management Board (party officers) ===
The Management Board was formed following the adoption of a new Constitution on 29 March 2025.

Members of the Second Management Board (31 January 2026-present):

Classification	Name
Leader	Jon Burrows
Deputy Leader	Diana Armstrong
Chair	Tom Elliott
Treasurer	Trevor Marshall
Officer (appointed by the Leader)	Sandra Overend
Vice-Chair	Jim Nicholson
Officer (elected at the AGM)	Ralph Ashenhurst
Officer (elected at the AGM)	Sam Nicholson
Officer (elected at the AGM)	Ben Sharkey
Parliamentary Party Representative	Reg Empey
Assembly Party Representative	
Councillors' Association Representative	David Taylor
Secretary to the Board (Non-Voting)	John Hanna

Members of the First Management Board (29 March 2025-31 January 2026):

Classification	Name
Leader	Mike Nesbitt
Deputy Leader	Robbie Butler
Chair	Tom Elliott
Treasurer	Trevor Marshall
Officer (appointed by the Leader)	Sandra Overend
Vice-Chair	Jim Nicholson
Officer (elected at the AGM)	Ralph Ashenhurst
Officer (elected at the AGM)	Sam Nicholson
Officer (elected at the AGM)	Ben Sharkey
Parliamentary Party Representative	Reg Empey
Assembly Party Representative	Andy Allen
Councillors' Association Representative	David Taylor
Secretary to the Board (Non-Voting)	John Hanna

=== Honorary President ===
Image	Name	Tenure		Notes
	Daphne Trimble	2023	Present	Appointed by Doug Beattie

== Electoral performance ==
=== Devolved legislature elections ===
Election	Leader	Body	Votes	%	Seats	+/–	Position	Status
1921	Viscount Craigavon	House of Commons	343,347	66.9	40 / 52	▲40	▲1st	Majority
1925	Viscount Craigavon	House of Commons	211,662	55.0	32 / 52	▼8	1st	Majority
1929	Viscount Craigavon	House of Commons	148,579	50.8	37 / 52	▲5	1st	Majority
1933	Viscount Craigavon	House of Commons	73,791	43.5	36 / 52	▼1	1st	Majority
1938	Viscount Craigavon	House of Commons	187,684	56.8	39 / 52	▲3	1st	Majority
1945	Viscount Brookeborough	House of Commons	180,342	50.4	33 / 52	▼6	1st	Majority
1949	Viscount Brookeborough	House of Commons	237,411	62.7	37 / 52	▲4	1st	Majority
1953	Viscount Brookeborough	House of Commons	125,379	48.6	38 / 52	▲1	1st	Majority
1958	Viscount Brookeborough	House of Commons	106,177	44.0	37 / 52	▼1	1st	Majority
1962	Viscount Brookeborough	House of Commons	147,629	48.8	34 / 52	▼3	1st	Majority
1965	Terence O'Neill	House of Commons	191,896	59.1	36 / 52	▲2	1st	Majority
1969	Terence O'Neill	House of Commons	269,501	48.2	36 / 52	Steady	1st	Majority
1973	Brian Faulkner	Assembly	258,790	35.8	31 / 78	▼5	1st	Coalition
1975	Harry West	Constitutional; Convention	167,214	25.4	19 / 78	▼12	1st	Consultative
1982	James Molyneaux	Assembly	188,277	29.7	26 / 78	▲7	1st	Largest party
1996	David Trimble	Forum	181,829	24.2	30 / 110	▲4	1st	Consultative
1998	David Trimble	Assembly	172,225	21.3	28 / 108	▼2	1st	Coalition
2003	David Trimble	Assembly	156,931	22.7	27 / 108	▼1	▼2nd	Direct rule
2007	Reg Empey	Assembly	103,145	14.9	18 / 108	▼9	▼3rd	Coalition
2011	Tom Elliott	Assembly	87,531	13.2	16 / 108	▼2	3rd	Coalition (2011–2015)
2011	Tom Elliott	Assembly	87,531	13.2	16 / 108	▼2	3rd	Opposition (2015–2016)
2016	Mike Nesbitt	Assembly	87,302	12.6	16 / 108	Steady	3rd	Opposition
2017	Mike Nesbitt	Assembly	103,314	12.9	10 / 90	▼6	▼4th	Coalition
2022	Doug Beattie	Assembly	96,390	11.2	9 / 90	▼1	4th	Coalition

=== Westminster elections ===
Election	Leader	Northern Ireland					Status
Election	Leader	Votes	%	Seats	+/–	Position	Status
1922	Viscount Craigavon	69,357	57.2	11 / 13	▲11	▲1st	Majority (Note: Ulster Unionist Party MPs took the whip of the Conservative Party until 1973)
1923	Viscount Craigavon	79,453	49.4	11 / 13	Steady	1st	Opposition
1924	Viscount Craigavon	286,895	83.8	13 / 13	▲2	1st	Majority
1929	Viscount Craigavon	247,291	68.0	11 / 13	▼2	1st	Opposition
1931	Viscount Craigavon	149,566	56.1	11 / 13	Steady	1st	Majority
1935	Viscount Craigavon	292,840	64.9	11 / 13	Steady	1st	Majority
1945	Viscount Brookeborough	394,373	61.0	9 / 13	▼2	1st	Opposition
1950	Viscount Brookeborough	352,334	62.8	10 / 12	▲1	1st	Opposition
1951	Viscount Brookeborough	274,928	59.4	9 / 12	▼1	1st	Majority
1955	Viscount Brookeborough	442,647	68.5	10 / 12	▲1	1st	Majority
1959	Viscount Brookeborough	445,013	77.2	12 / 12	▲2	1st	Majority
1964	Terence O'Neill	401,897	63.2	12 / 12	Steady	1st	Opposition
1966	Terence O'Neill	368,629	61.8	11 / 12	▼1	1st	Opposition
1970	James Chichester-Clark	422,041	54.3	8 / 12	▼3	1st	Majority (1970–1973)
1970	James Chichester-Clark	422,041	54.3	8 / 12	▼3	1st	Opposition (1973–1974)
Feb 1974	Harry West	232,103	32.3	7 / 12	▼1	1st	Opposition
Oct 1974	Harry West	256,053	36.5	6 / 12	▼1	1st	Opposition
1979	Harry West	254,578	36.6	5 / 12	▼1	1st	Opposition
1983	James Molyneaux	259,952	34.0	11 / 17	▲6	1st	Opposition
1987	James Molyneaux	276,230	37.8	9 / 17	▼2	1st	Opposition
1992	James Molyneaux	271,049	34.5	9 / 17	Steady	1st	Opposition
1997	David Trimble	258,439	32.7	10 / 18	▲1	1st	Opposition
2001	David Trimble	216,839	26.7	6 / 18	▼4	1st	Opposition
2005	David Trimble	127,414	17.7	1 / 18	▼5	3rd	Opposition
2010	Sir Reg Empey	102,361	15.2	0 / 18	▼1	▼15th	No seats
2015	Mike Nesbitt	114,935	16.0	2 / 18	▲2	▲4th	Opposition
2017	Robin Swann	83,280	10.3	0 / 18	▼2	▼12th	No seats
2019	Steve Aiken	93,123	11.7	0 / 18	Steady	12th	No seats
2024	Doug Beattie	94,779	12.2	1 / 18	▲1	▲4th	Opposition

=== Local government ===
Election	Votes	%	Seats	+/–
1973	255,187	17.0	194 / 517	▲194
1977	166,971	30.0	176 / 526	▼18
1981	175,965	26.4	151 / 526	▼25
1985	188,497	29.5	189 / 565	▲38
1989	193,064	31.3	194 / 565	▲5
1993	184,082	29.0	197 / 582	▲3
1997	175,036	28.0	185 / 575	▼12
2001	181,336	23.0	154 / 582	▼29
2005	126,317	18.0	115 / 582	▼39
2011	100,643	15.2	99 / 583	▼16
2014	101,385	16.1	88 / 462	▼11
2019	95,320	14.1	75 / 462	▼13
2023	81,282	10.9	54 / 462	▼21

=== European Parliament ===
Election	Votes	%	Seats	+/–	Position
1979	125,169	21.9	1 / 3	▲1	▲3rd
1984	147,169	21.5	1 / 3	Steady	▲2nd
1989	118,785	22.0	1 / 3	Steady	▼3rd
1994	133,459	22.8	1 / 3	Steady	3rd
1999	119,507	17.6	1 / 3	Steady	3rd
2004	91,164	16.6	1 / 3	Steady	3rd
2009	82,892	17.0	1 / 3	Steady	3rd
2014	83,438	13.3	1 / 3	Steady	3rd
2019	53,052	9.3	0 / 3	▼1	▼6th

== See also ==
- Ulster Unionist Party politicians
- List of Ulster Unionist Party peers
- List of Ulster Unionist Party MPs
- Ulster Unionist Chief Whip
- Ulster Unionist Party Presidents and General Secretaries
