= Robbie Butler =

Unionist politician (born 1972)

Robbie Butler MLA
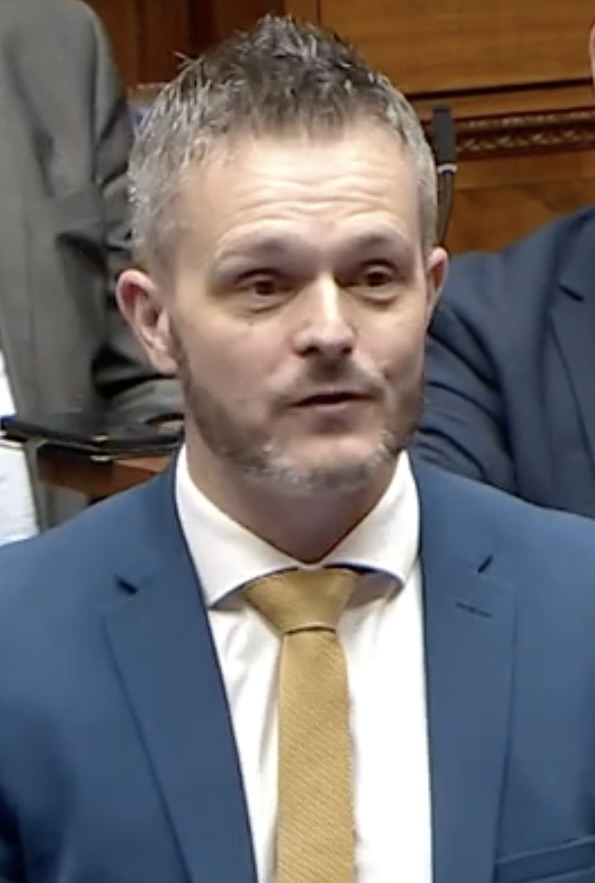
- Butler in 2024

Minister of Health
- Incumbent
- Assumed office 20 August 2026
- First Minister: Michelle O'Neill
- Preceded by: Mike Nesbitt

Member of the Northern Ireland Assembly for Lagan Valley
- Incumbent
- Assumed office 5 May 2016
- Preceded by: Basil McCrea

Chair of the Committee for Agriculture, Environment and Rural Affairs
- In office 28 September 2024 – 20 August 2026
- Deputy: Declan McAleer
- Preceded by: Tom Elliott
- Succeeded by: Diana Armstrong

Ulster Unionist portfolios
- 2024–present: Agriculture, Environment and Rural Affairs
- April 2024–October 2024 2019–2021: Chief Whip
- 2021–2024: Education

Deputy Leader of the Ulster Unionist Party (Note: As Deputy Leader of the Ulster Unionist Party in the Northern Ireland Assembly from 24 May 2021 until 5 July 2025)
- In office 24 May 2021 – 31 January 2026
- Leader: Doug Beattie; Mike Nesbitt
- Preceded by: Doug Beattie (as Assembly Deputy Leader)
- Succeeded by: Diana Armstrong

Member of Lisburn & Castlereagh Council
- In office 22 May 2014 – 5 May 2016
- Preceded by: Office established
- Succeeded by: Alexander Redpath
- Constituency: Killultagh

Personal details
- Born: 16 April 1972 (age 54) Lisburn, Northern Ireland
- Party: Ulster Unionist Party
- Spouse: Belinda Butler
- Children: 2
- Occupation: Politician
- Profession: Firefighter

Robbie Butler MLA (born 16 April 1972) is a Northern Irish unionist politician who has served as Minister of Health since 20 August 2026. He was the inaugural Deputy Leader of the Ulster Unionist Party (UUP) from July 2025 until January 2026, the UUP's Deputy Leader of the Assembly Group from May 2021 until January 2026, and has been a Member of the Northern Ireland Assembly (MLA) for Lagan Valley since 2016.

He has been the UUP's representative for Agriculture, the Environment and Rural Affairs since 2024. He is an officer in the Boys' Brigade at 1st Magheragall.

== Career ==
=== Early career ===
Before entering politics, Butler worked as a butcher from the age of 16, became a prison officer in 1996 and then a firefighter in 2000.

Butler was a UUP candidate in the 2014 local elections for Lisburn and Castlereagh Council. He stood in the Killultagh electoral area and was elected as a councillor with 18.2% of the vote.

=== Member of the Legislative Assembly (2016–) ===
At the 2016 Northern Ireland Assembly election, he was elected to the Assembly as one of two UUP representatives for Lagan Valley.

He was the UUP candidate for Lagan Valley in the 2017 general election, polling 16.8% of the vote. He stood again in the 2019 election, polling 19.0%. In the 2024 election, he stood once more in Lagan Valley and won 22.7%.

Following Steve Aiken's resignation as leader of the UUP, Butler was reported to be "giving serious consideration" around standing for the party leadership. Butler decided not to stand, and Doug Beattie was elected unopposed.

==== Deputy Leader of the Ulster Unionist Party (2021–2026) ====
On 24 May 2021, in addition to his existing role as party chief whip, Butler was appointed Deputy Leader of the Assembly Group.

In July 2023, Butler, as UUP deputy leader, ruled out any electoral pact with the Democratic Unionist Party (DUP) for the 2024 United Kingdom general election.

As UUP Education spokesperson, Butler, in August 2023, stated that "any new RSE (Relationships and Sex Education) curriculum must be created with the input of parents, children and teaching professionals from Northern Ireland only."

Butler accused the Department of Health of forcing community and voluntary organisations towards a "financial cliff edge" on 23 August 2023. He called for the extension of the Core Grant Scheme.

Butler was nominated and approved as the UUP's first Deputy Leader on 5 July 2025. The UUP's Deputy Leader position was created following the adoption of a new Constitution on 29 March 2025.

==== Minister of Health (2026-present) ====
Butler was appointed to the Northern Ireland Executive as Minister of Health on 20 August 2026, following the resignation of Mike Nesbitt. He said he wanted Northern Ireland to "have a world-class health service that people can access more quickly".

== Notes ==
Northern Ireland Assembly
Preceded by Basil McCrea	MLA for Lagan Valley; 2016 – present	Incumbent
