= 2019 Fermanagh and Omagh District Council election =

2019 Northern Irish local government election

← 2014	2 May 2019	2023 →

All 40 council seats 21 seats needed for a majority
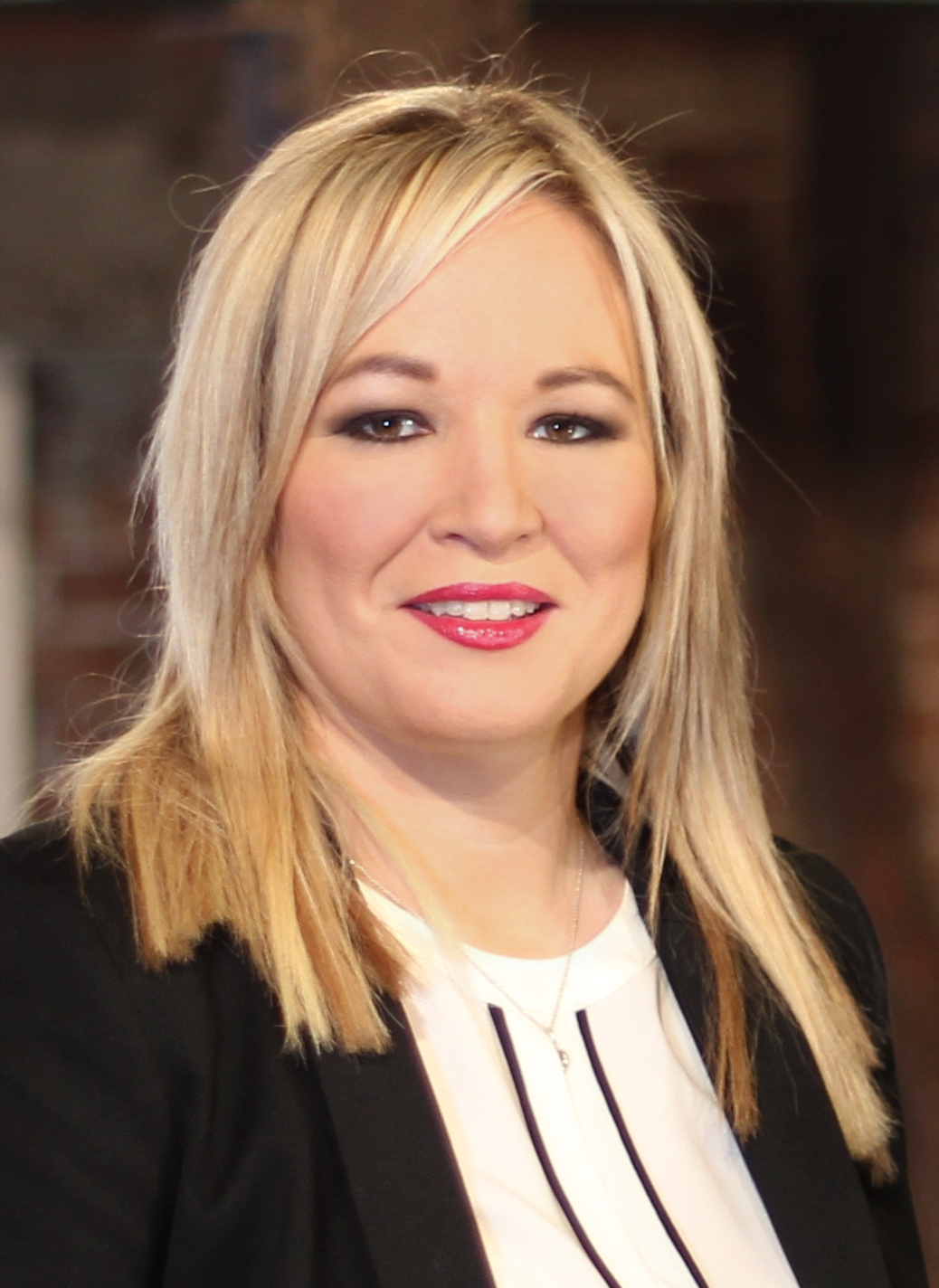

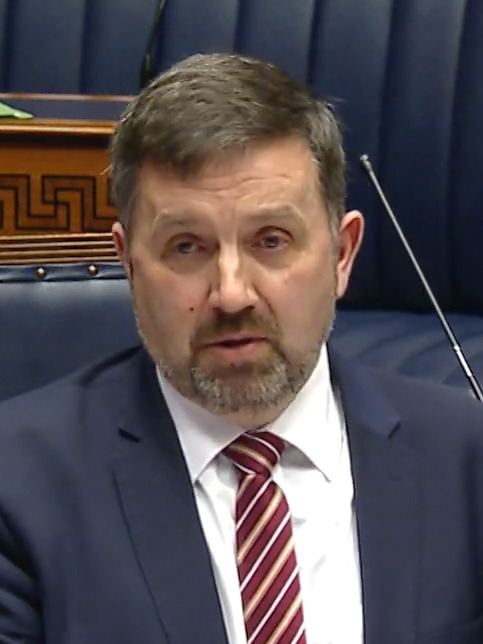

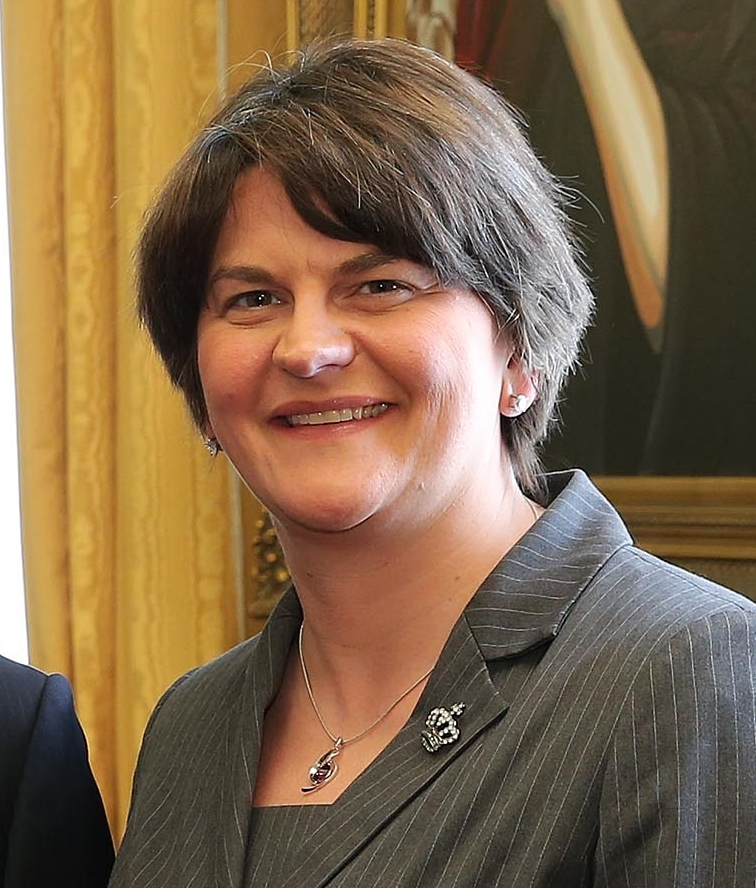

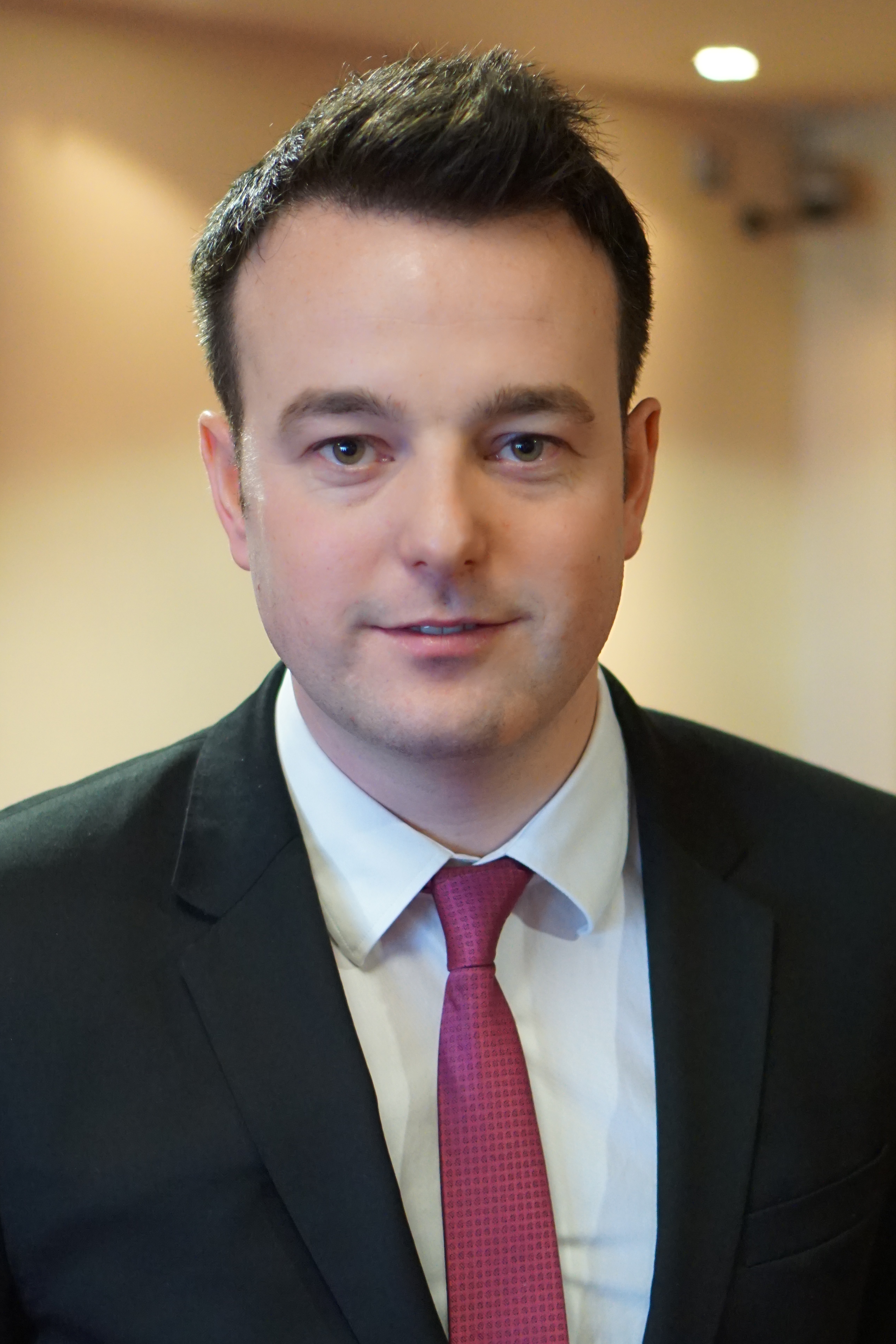

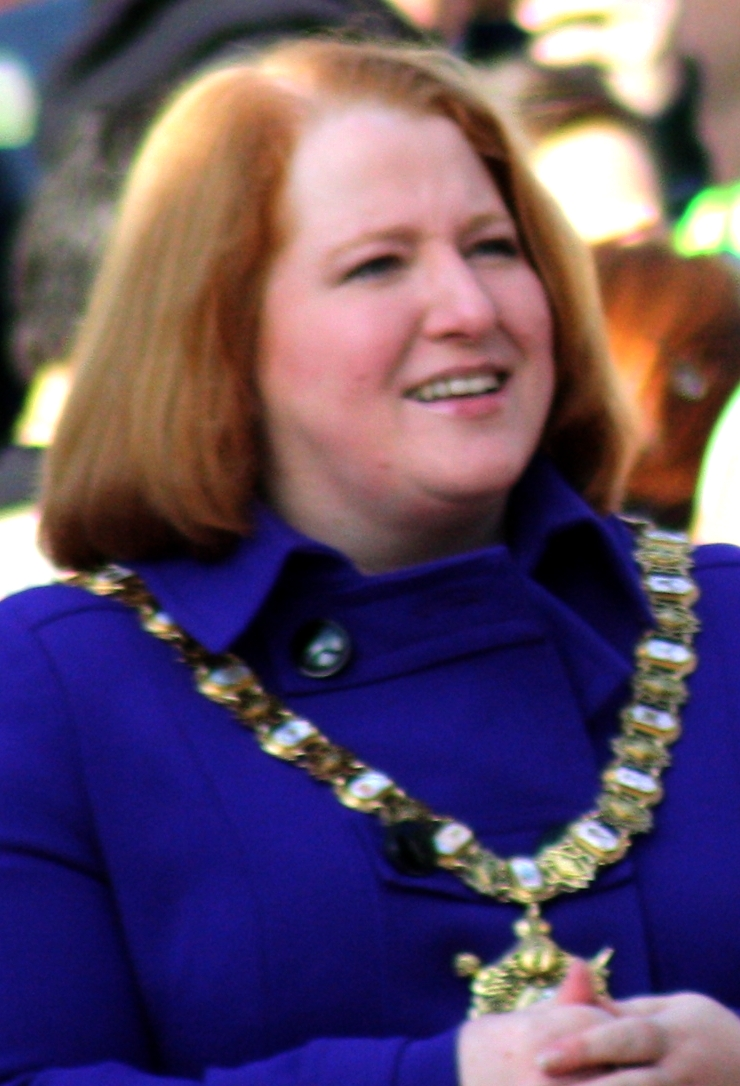
	First party	Second party	Third party
Leader	Michelle O'Neill	Robin Swann	Arlene Foster
Party	Sinn Féin	UUP	DUP
Seats before	17	9	5
Seats won	15	9	5
Seat change	▼2	0	0
	Fourth party	Fifth party	Sixth party
Leader	Colum Eastwood	Naomi Long	Owen McCracken
Party	SDLP	Alliance	Labour Alternative
Seats before	8	0	0
Seats won	5	1	1
Seat change	▼3	▲1	▲1
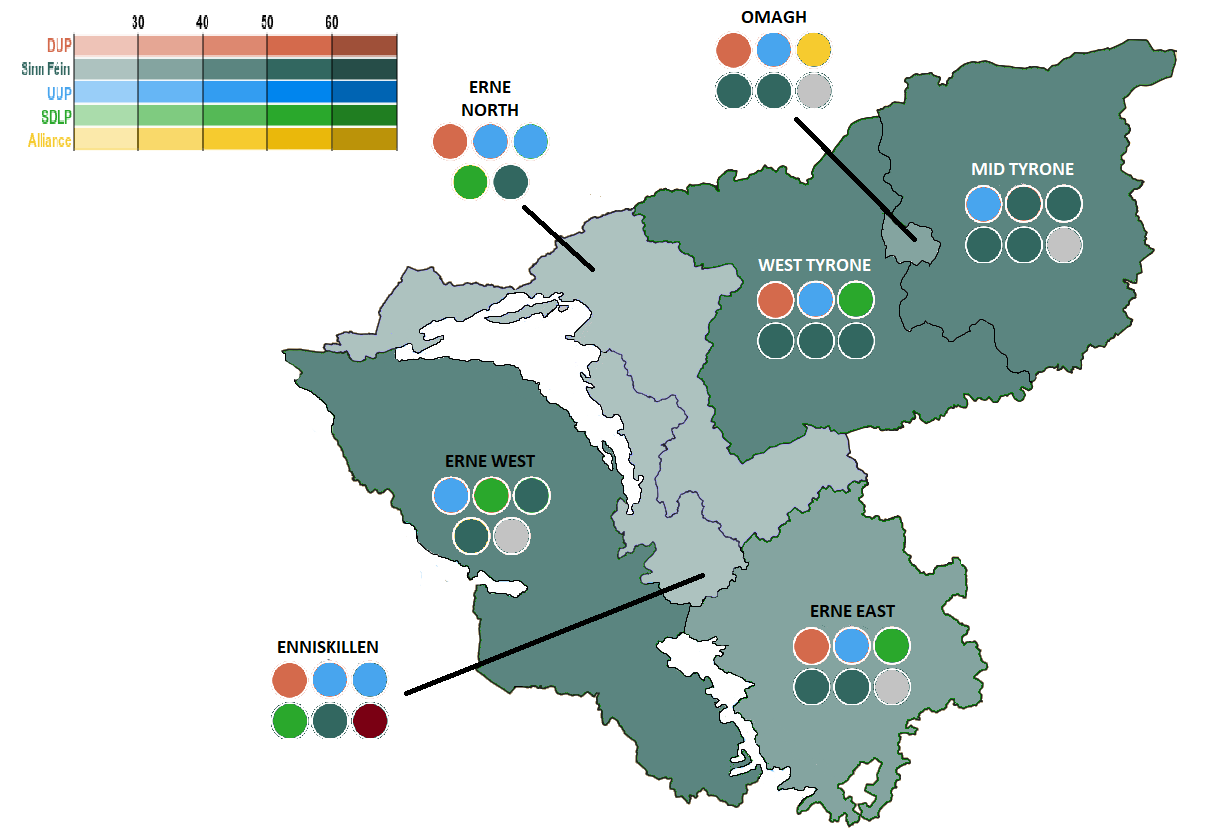
- Fermanagh and Omagh 2019 Council Election Results by DEA (Shaded by plurality of FPVs)

Elections took place for Fermanagh and Omagh District Council on 2 May 2019, part of that year's local elections. 40 Councillors were elected via STV.

Sinn Féin emerged as the largest party with Fifteen seats, six ahead of the Ulster Unionist Party and six seats away from overall control. The Alliance Party and Cross-Community Labour Alternative both gained representation onto the council for the first time.

== Election results ==
Fermanagh and Omagh District Council Election Result 2019
Party	Seats	Gains	Losses	Net gain/loss	Seats %	Votes %	Votes	+/−
Sinn Féin	15	0	2	▼2	37.5	36.8	19,111	▼3.3
UUP	9	0	0	0	22.5	16.6	8,612	▼4.3
DUP	5	0	0	0	12.5	15.9	8,277	▲1.3
SDLP	5	0	3	▼3	12.5	10.5	5,475	▼4.2
Independent	4	3	0	▲3	10.0	10.5	5,151	▲5.9
Alliance	1	1	0	▲1	2.5	3.3	2,035	▲1.6
Labour Alternative	1	1	0	0	5.0	1.4	720	New
TUV	0	0	0	0	0.0	2.1	1,072	▼0.1
Aontú	0	0	0	0	0.0	2.0	1,062	New
Green (NI)	0	0	0	0	0.0	0.5	277	▼0.1
CISTA	0	0	0	0	0.0	0.2	101	New
Democrats and Veterans	0	0	0	0	0.0	0.1	20	New

Note: "Votes" are the first preference votes.

The overall turnout was 61.57% with a total of 51,913 valid votes cast. A total of 707 ballots were rejected.

== Districts summary ==
Results of the Fermanagh and Omagh District Council election, 2019 by district
Ward	%	Cllrs	%	Cllrs	%	Cllrs	%	Cllrs	%	Cllrs	%	Cllrs	Total Cllrs
Ward	Sinn Féin		UUP		DUP		SDLP		Alliance		Others		Total Cllrs
Enniskillen	23.6	1	19.4	2	20.8	1	13.2	1	4.3	0	18.7	1	6
Erne East	38.1	2	16.0	1	16.3	1	9.9	1	0.0	0	19.7	1	6
Erne North	26.6	1	26.5	2	20.4	1	13.3	1	6.0	0	7.1	0	5
Erne West	43.6	2	18.1	1	7.4	0	8.3	1	0.0	0	22.6	1	5
Mid Tyrone	48.4	4	12.1	1	11.5	0	7.4	0	3.8	0	16.8	1	6
Omagh	31.4	2	9.9	1	15.2	1	8.1	0	9.7	1	25.7	1	6
West Tyrone	42.8	3	14.5	1	20.5	1	13.9	1	5.2	0	3.2	0	6
Total	36.8	15	16.6	9	15.9	5	10.5	5	3.3	1	14.7	5	40

== District results ==
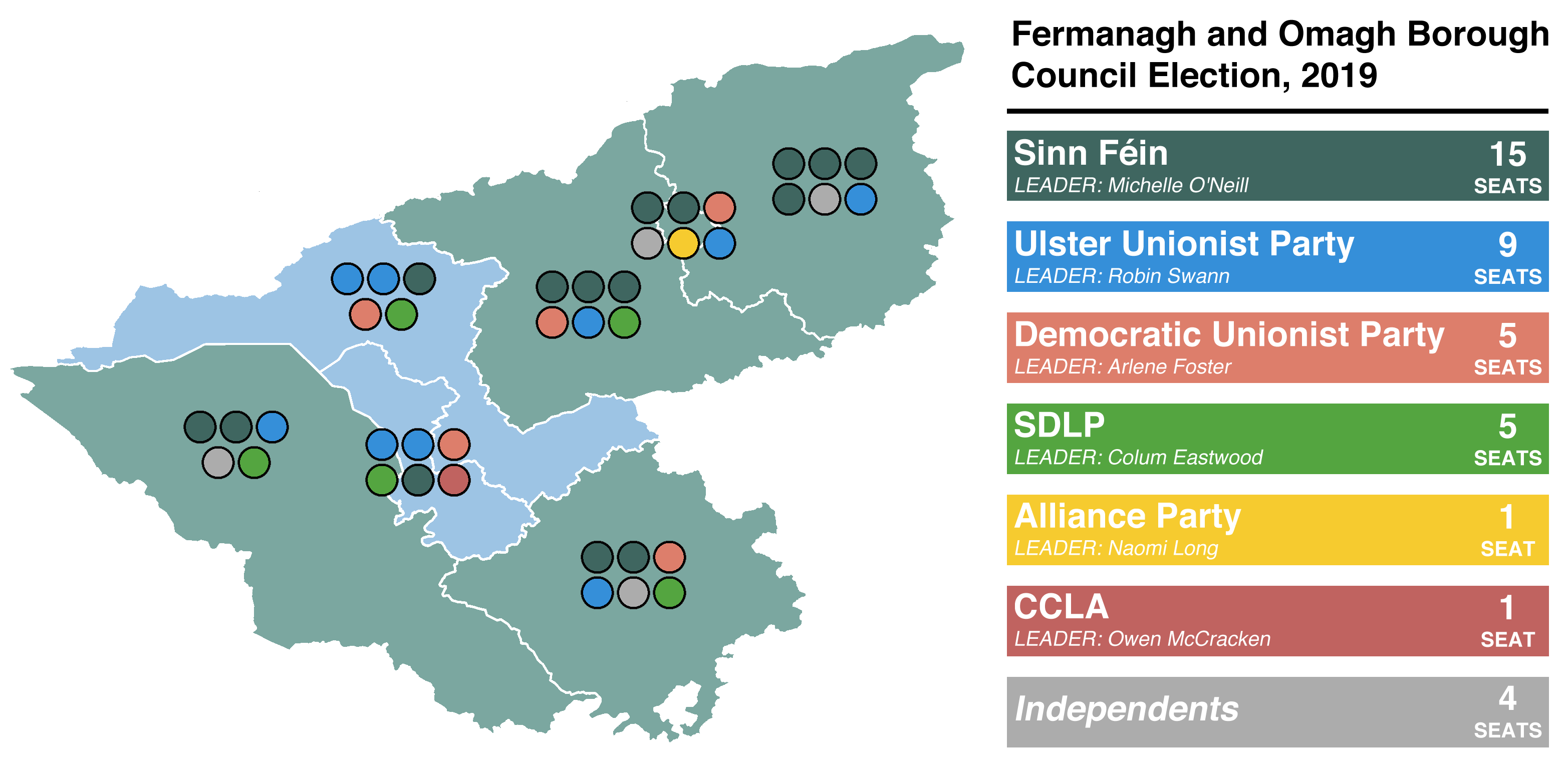
Map of results by District Electoral Area. Each DEA is highlighted in the colour of the plurality winner of FPVs.

=== Enniskillen ===
2014: 2 x UUP, 2 x Sinn Féin, 1 x DUP, 1 x SDLP
2019: 2 x UUP, 1 x Sinn Féin, 1 x DUP, 1 x SDLP, 1 x Cross-Community Labour Alternative
2014-2019 Change: Cross-Community Labour Alternative gain from Sinn Féin

Enniskillen - 6 seats
Party	Candidate	FPv%	Count						
Party	Candidate	FPv%	1	2	3	4	5	6	7
DUP	Keith Elliott*	16.07%	1,161						
SDLP	Paul Blake*	13.22%	955	966	967.1	1,085.1			
UUP	Robert Irvine*	10.42%	753	758	777.91	822.02	987.32	1,296.32	
UUP	Howard Thornton* †	9.01%	651	657	670.97	694.08	805.4	1,051.53	
Sinn Féin	Tommy Maguire*	13.09%	946	951	951.33	955.33	955.33	957.33	958.33
Labour Alternative	Donal O'Cofaigh	9.97%	720	756	756.88	872.99	879.65	897.76	949.76
Sinn Féin	Debbie Coyle*	10.53%	761	778	778.44	789.44	789.77	793.88	797.88
TUV	Donald Crawford	6.81%	492	493	504.33	510.44	638.63		
DUP	Simon Wiggins	4.71%	340	344	422.32	427.43			
Alliance	Matthew Beaumont	4.29%	310	353	353.66				
Green (NI)	Debbie Coleman	1.88%	136						
Electorate: 13,048 Valid: 7,225 (55.37%) Spoilt: 87 Quota: 1,033 Turnout: 7,312 (56.04%)

=== Erne East ===
2014: 3 x Sinn Féin, 1 x DUP, 1 x UUP, 1 x SDLP
2019: 2 x Sinn Féin, 1 x DUP, 1 x UUP, 1 x SDLP, 1 x Independent
2014-2019 Change: Independent gain from Sinn Féin

Erne East - 6 seats
Party	Candidate	FPv%	Count					
Party	Candidate	FPv%	1	2	3	4	5	6
DUP	Paul Robinson*	16.34%	1,382					
UUP	Victor Warrington*	15.99%	1,352					
Independent	John McCluskey †	15.21%	1,286					
Sinn Féin	Tom O'Reilly*	9.80%	829	830.06	830.64	854.64	876.96	1,248.96
Sinn Féin	Sheamus Greene*	12.20%	1,032	1,032	1,032.56	1,057.56	1,064.34	1,211.34
SDLP	Garbhan McPhillips*	9.92%	839	879.68	928.54	983.68	1,175.68	1,205.86
Sinn Féin	Noeleen Hayes	8.73%	738	738.18	738.18	754.18	766.32	834.5
Sinn Féin	Brian McCaffrey*	7.33%	620	620.54	620.54	632.54	639.72	
Independent	Caroline Wheeler	2.41%	204	326.76	415.66	439.2		
Aontú	Gerry McHugh	2.06%	174	175.8	176.36			
Electorate: 11,963 Valid: 8,456 (70.68%) Spoilt: 112 Quota: 1,209 Turnout: 8,568 (71.62%)

=== Erne North ===
2014: 2 x UUP, 1 x DUP, 1 x Sinn Féin, 1 x SDLP
2019: 2 x UUP, 1 x DUP, 1 x Sinn Féin, 1 x SDLP
2014-2019 Change: No change

Erne North - 5 seats
Party	Candidate	FPv%	Count						
Party	Candidate	FPv%	1	2	3	4	5	6	7
UUP	Diana Armstrong*	17.32%	1,186						
SDLP	John Coyle*	13.30%	911	914	1,142				
Sinn Féin	Siobhan Currie †	15.40%	1,055	1,056	1,086	1,088	1,088.18	1,779.18	
UUP	John McClaughry	9.20%	630	633	701	883	909.94	921.94	956.94
DUP	Deborah Armstrong †	9.75%	668	670	678	849	853.41	859.41	867.41
DUP	David Mahon*	10.69%	732	736	740	829	832.39	833.39	840.39
Sinn Féin	John Feely*	11.23%	769	769	791	792	792.03		
TUV	Alex Elliot	6.80%	465	468	477				
Alliance	Diane Little	6.03%	413	415					
Democrats and Veterans	Lewis Jennings	0.29%	20						
Electorate: 10,983 Valid: 6,849 (62.36%) Spoilt: 92 Quota: 1,142 Turnout: 6,941 (63.20%)

=== Erne West ===
2014: 2 x Sinn Féin, 1 x SDLP, 1 x UUP, 1 x Independent
2019: 2 x Sinn Féin, 1 x SDLP, 1 x UUP, 1 x Independent
2014-2019 Change: No change

Erne West - 5 seats
Party	Candidate	FPv%	Count			
Party	Candidate	FPv%	1	2	3	4
UUP	Alex Baird*	18.05%	1,333			
Independent	Bernice Swift*	15.69%	1,159	1,160.05	1,295.05	
Sinn Féin	Anthony Feely*	16.36%	1,208	1,208.14	1,238.14	
Sinn Féin	Chris McCaffrey	15.38%	1,136	1,136	1,153	1,154.56
SDLP	Adam Gannon	8.27%	611	619.82	799.8	1,116.59
Sinn Féin	Fionnuala Leonard	11.90%	879	879	895	898.28
DUP	Carol Johnston	7.41%	547	601.88	712.65	
Independent	Trevor Armstrong	6.93%	512	537.27		
Electorate: 10,825 Valid: 7,385 (68.22%) Spoilt: 88 Quota: 1,231 Turnout: 7,473 (69.03%)

=== Mid Tyrone ===
2014: 4 x Sinn Féin, 1 x UUP, 1 x SDLP
2019: 4 x Sinn Féin, 1 x UUP, 1 x Independent
2014-2019 Change: Independent gain from SDLP

Mid Tyrone - 6 seats
Party	Candidate	FPv%	Count					
Party	Candidate	FPv%	1	2	3	4	5	6
Independent	Emmet McAleer	11.09%	897	903	986	1,134	1,326	
Sinn Féin	Pádraigín Kelly	12.30%	995	1,045	1,056	1,081	1,145	1,168
Sinn Féin	Catherine Kelly	11.92%	964	1,002	1,014	1,035	1,109	1,122
UUP	Bert Wilson* †	12.10%	979	979	1,007	1,016	1,080	1,093
Sinn Féin	Sean Clarke*	10.99%	889	931	941	964	1,066	1,084
Sinn Féin	Sean Donnelly* †	9.62%	778	896	902	988	1,060	1,071
DUP	James Managh	11.51%	931	931	939	943	951	951
SDLP	Bernard McGrath	7.39%	598	619	725	825		
Aontú	Rosemarie Shields*	5.74%	464	469	491			
Alliance	Richard Bullick	3.78%	306	311				
Sinn Féin	Kevin McColgan	3.55%	287					
Electorate: 12,556 Valid: 8,088 (64.42%) Spoilt: 114 Quota: 1,156 Turnout: 8,202 (65.32%)

=== Omagh ===
2014: 2 x Sinn Féin, 2 x SDLP, 1 x DUP, 1 x UUP
2019: 2 x Sinn Féin, 1 x DUP, 1 x UUP, 1 x Alliance, 1 x Independent
2014-2019 Change: Alliance and Independent gain from SDLP (two seats)

Omagh - 6 seats
Party	Candidate	FPv%	Count										
Party	Candidate	FPv%	1	2	3	4	5	6	7	8	9	10	11
DUP	Errol Thompson*	15.24%	970										
Sinn Féin	Barry McElduff	14.14%	900	900	903	914							
Independent	Josephine Deehan*	11.44%	728	728.96	738.02	752.02	762.62	800.68	840.74	916.74			
Alliance	Stephen Donnelly	9.68%	616	616.24	620.24	638.24	641.48	665.48	697.48	708.48	735.48	807.48	935.48
UUP	Chris Smyth* †	9.95%	633	676.44	677.56	678.62	775.02	776.08	787.26	791.32	797.32	803.32	839.44
Sinn Féin	Ann-Marie Fitzgerald*	9.26%	589	589	589	594	595	607	611	629	639	670	791
Sinn Féin	Marty McColgan*	8.00%	509	509	511	520	520	530	536	550	554	604	643
SDLP	Lee Hawkes	4.02%	256	256.18	257.18	262.18	263.24	271.24	285.3	292.3	491.36	532.36	
Independent	Sorcha McAnespy*	3.05%	194	194.06	198.06	212.06	212.12	234.12	257.12	292.12	309.12		
SDLP	Jacinta McKeown	4.05%	258	258.12	258.12	258.12	259.12	264.12	266.12	279.12			
Aontú	Margaret Swift	2.86%	182	182	182	187	188.06	192.06	205.06				
Green (NI)	Susan Glass	2.22%	141	141.24	144.3	151.3	155.42	165.54					
Independent	Joanne Donnelly*	2.01%	128	128.3	135.3	146.36	146.36						
TUV	Charles Chittick	1.81%	115	125.2	125.26	132.26							
CISTA	Barry Brown	1.59%	101	101.24	109.24								
Independent	Will Convey	0.68%	43	43.3									
Electorate: 12,737 Valid: 6,363 (49.96%) Spoilt: 98 Quota: 910 Turnout: 6,461 (50.73%)

=== West Tyrone ===
2014: 3 x Sinn Féin, 1 x DUP, 1 x UUP, 1 x SDLP
2019: 3 x Sinn Féin, 1 x DUP, 1 x UUP, 1 x SDLP
2014-2019 Change: No change

West Tyrone - 6 seats
Party	Candidate	FPv%	Count					
Party	Candidate	FPv%	1	2	3	4	5	6
DUP	Mark Buchanan*	20.48%	1,546					
UUP	Allan Rainey*	14.51%	1,095					
SDLP	Mary Garrity*	13.87%	1,047	1,203.24				
Sinn Féin	Ann-Marie Donnelly	9.96%	752	752.62	772.62	772.62	1,307.62	
Sinn Féin	Glenn Campbell*	13.03%	983	986.1	1,038.1	1,038.72	1,104.72	
Sinn Féin	Stephen McCann*	11.12%	839	839.62	881.62	885.34	929.34	1,144.45
Alliance	Fia Cowan	5.17%	390	667.76	732.44	797.54	804.54	814.34
Sinn Féin	Frankie Donnelly*	8.65%	653	654.24	662.24	662.24		
Aontú	Cathal McCrory	3.21%	242	265.56				
Electorate: 12,201 Valid: 7,547 (61.86%) Spoilt: 116 Quota: 1,079 Turnout: 7,663 (62.81%)

* Incumbent

== Changes during the term ==
=== † Co-options ===
Date	Electoral Area	Party	Outgoing	Co-optee	Reason
26 March 2020	Erne East	Independent	John McCluskey	Eamon Keenan	McCluskey resigned.
5 August 2021	Omagh	UUP	Chris Smyth	Matthew Bell	Smyth resigned.
5 November 2021	Erne North	DUP	Deborah Erskine	Paul Stevenson	Erskine was co-opted to the Northern Ireland Assembly.
23 December 2021	Mid Tyrone	Sinn Féin	Sean Donnelly	Patrick Withers	Donnelly died.
7 June 2022	Erne North	Sinn Féin	Siobhán Currie	Debbie Coyle	Currie resigned.
23 September 2022	Enniskillen	UUP	Howard Thornton	Roy Crawford	Thornton resigned.
19 November 2022	Mid Tyrone	UUP	Bert Wilson	Rosemary Barton	Wilson resigned.

=== – Suspensions ===
None

Last updated 17 November 2022.

Current composition: see Fermanagh and Omagh District Council
