= 2014 Fermanagh and Omagh District Council election =

2014 Northern Irish local government election

← 2011	22 May 2014	2019 →

All 40 council seats 21 seats needed for a majority
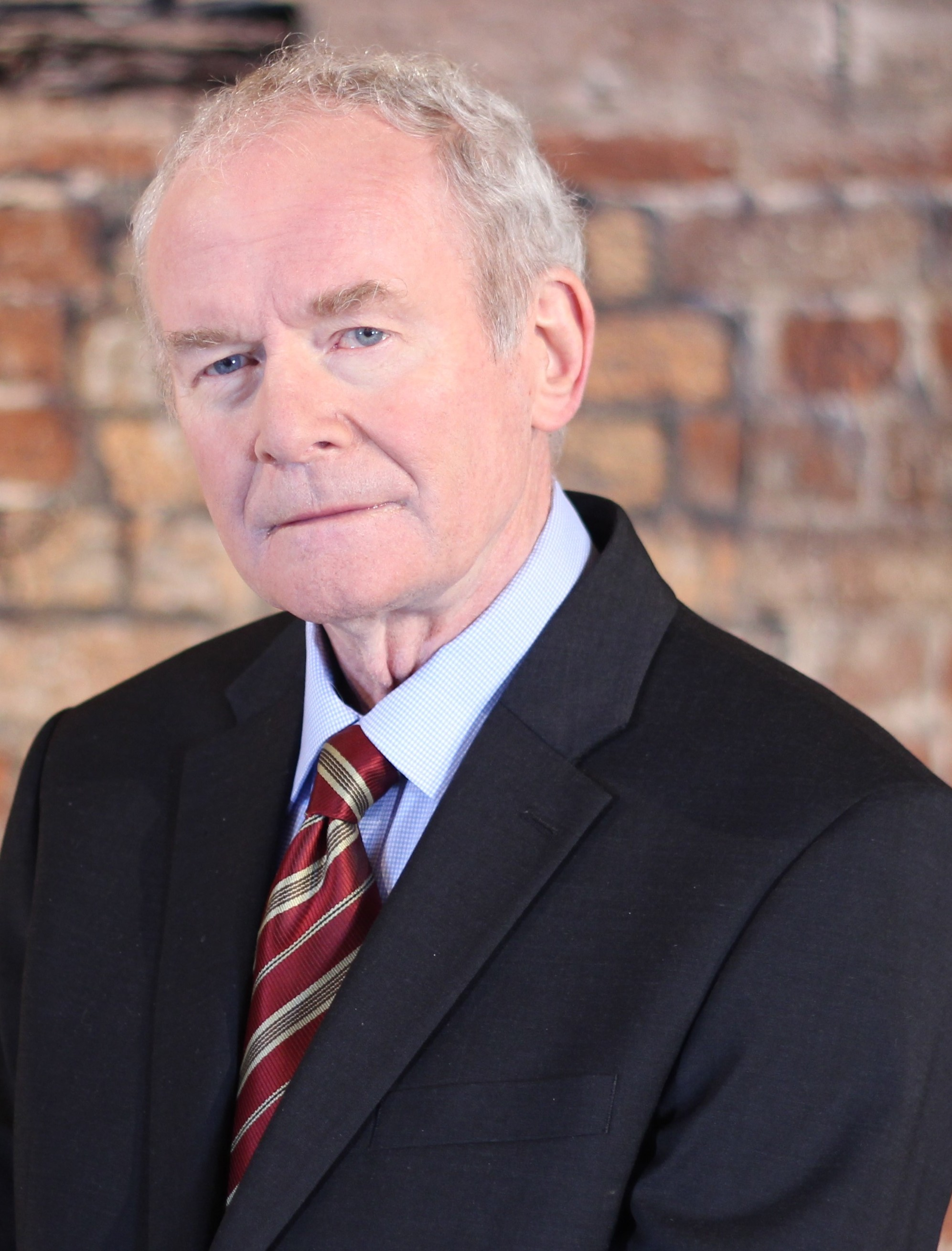

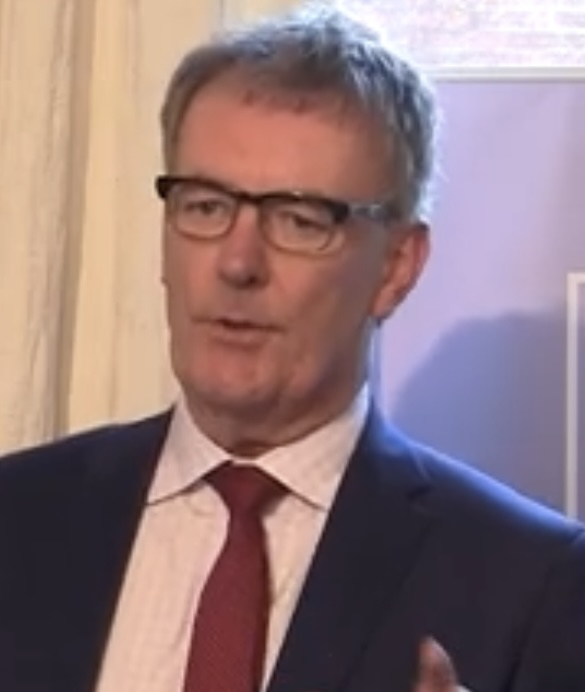

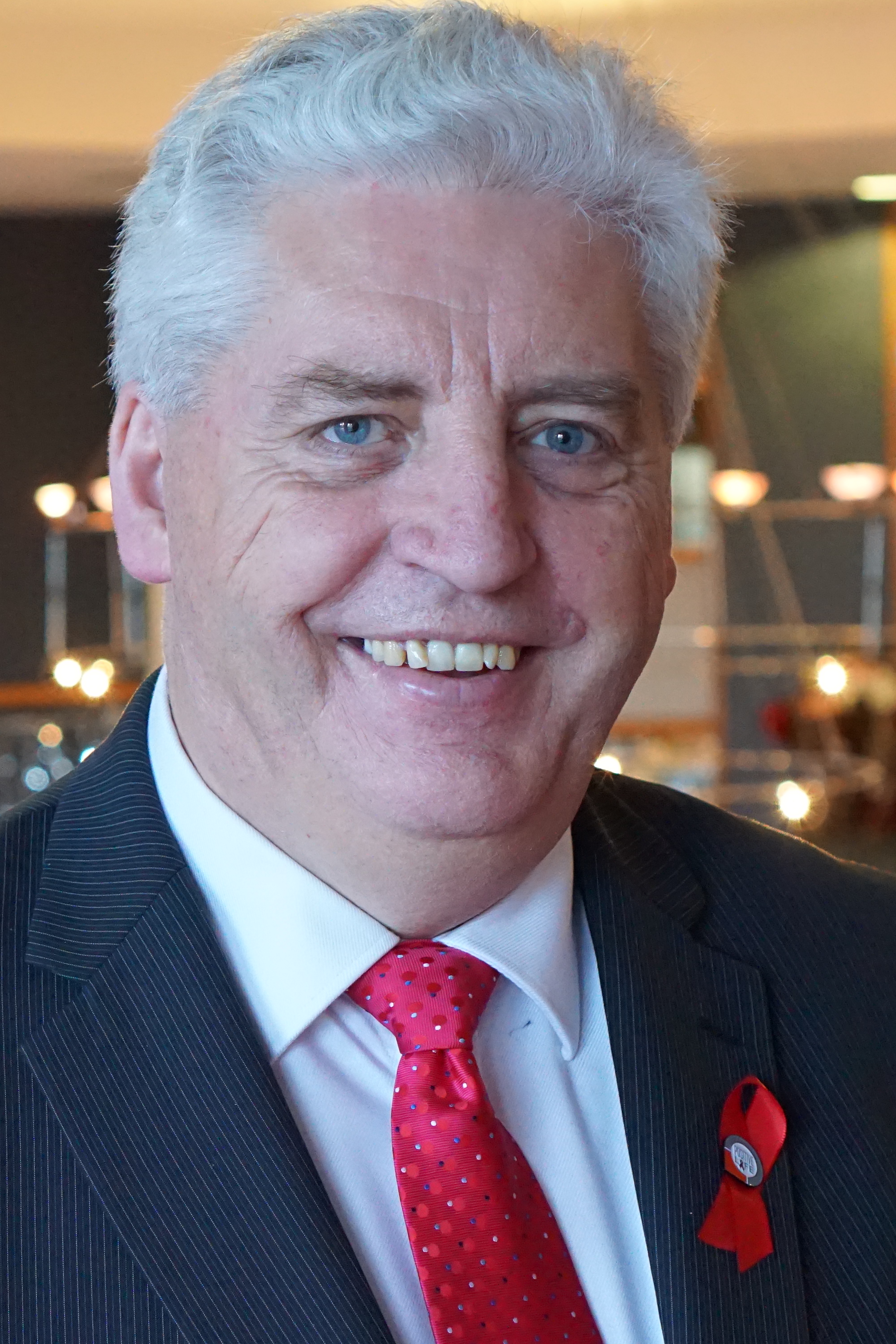

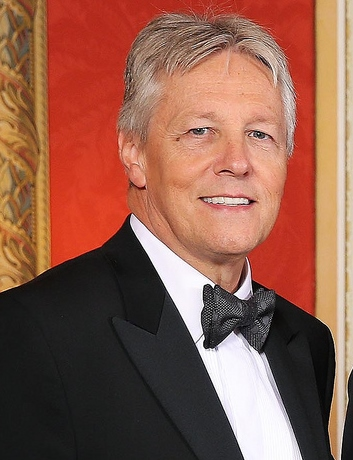
	First party	Second party	Third party
Leader	Martin McGuinness	Mike Nesbitt	Alasdair McDonnell
Party	Sinn Féin	UUP	SDLP
Seats won	17	9	8
Seat change	New council	New council	New council
	Fourth party	Fifth party
Leader	Peter Robinson
Party	DUP	Independent
Seats won	5	1
Seat change	New council	New council
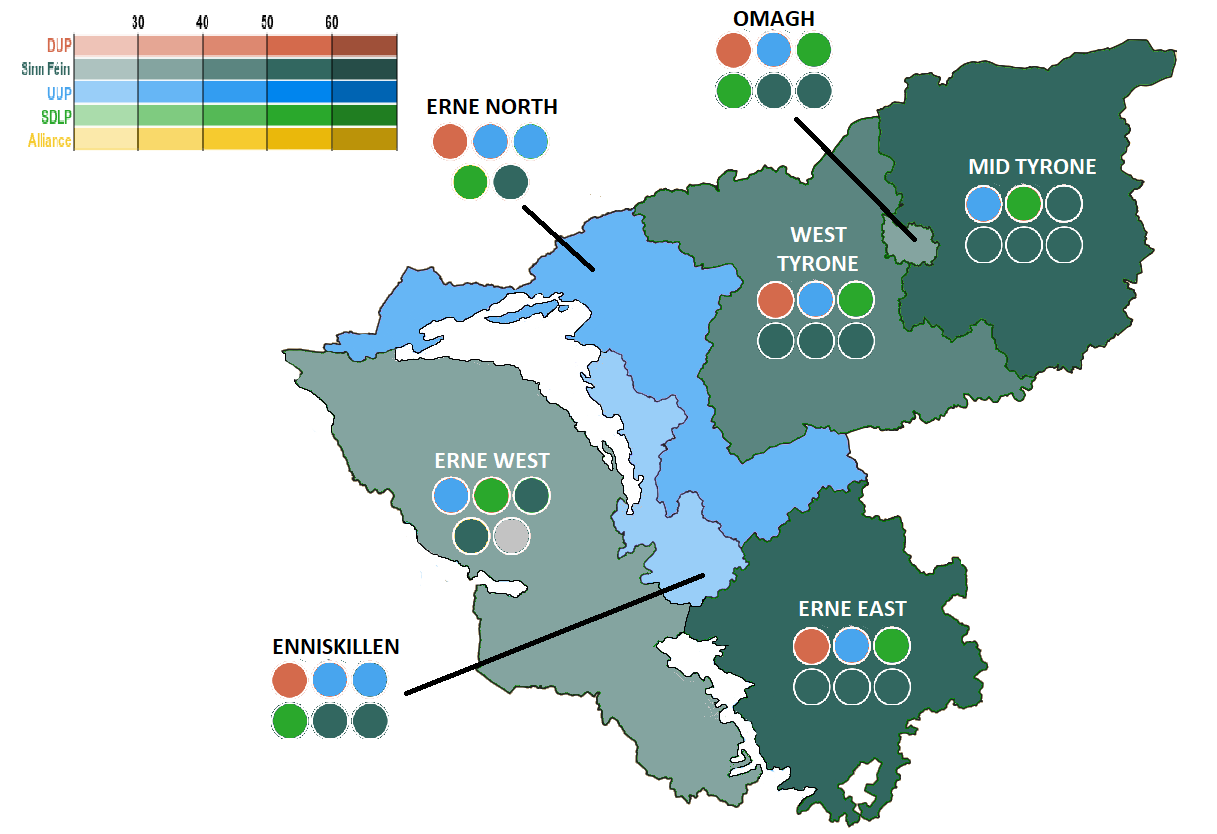
- Fermanagh and Omagh 2014 Council Election Results by DEA (Shaded by plurality of FPVs

The first election to Fermanagh and Omagh District Council, part of the Northern Ireland local elections on 22 May 2014, returned 40 members to the newly-formed council via Single Transferable Vote.

Sinn Féin emerged as the largest party with seventeen seats, eight ahead of the Ulster Unionist Party and four seats away from overall control. The council would act as a shadow authority until 1 April 2015, where Sinn Féin's Thomas O'Reilly would become Chairman and Paul Robinson of the DUP Vice Chairman.

== Results by party ==
Party	Seats	First Pref. votes	FPv%
Sinn Féin	17	18,930	38.97%
UUP	9	10,158	20.91%
SDLP	8	7,164	14.75%
DUP	5	7,075	14.57%
Independent	1	2,164	4.46%
TUV	0	1,091	2.25%
Alliance	0	819	1.69%
UKIP	0	296	0.61%
Green (NI)	0	269	0.55%
Totals	40	48,572	100.00%

== Districts summary ==
Results of the Fermanagh and Omagh District Council election, 2014 by district
Ward	%	Cllrs	%	Cllrs	%	Cllrs	%	Cllrs	%	Cllrs	Total Cllrs
Ward	Sinn Féin		UUP		SDLP		DUP		Others		Total Cllrs
Enniskillen	21.7	2	24.2	2	9.5	1	19.0	1	25.6	0	6
Erne East	51.3	3	16.2	1	12.9	1	15.9	1	3.7	0	6
Erne North	24.6	1	38.1	2	16.6	1	13.5	0	7.2	0	5
Erne West	39.3	2	23.4	1	13.9	1	6.1	0	17.3	1	5
Mid Tyrone	57.3	4	17.1	1	12.7	1	8.5	0	4.4	0	6
Omagh	37.5	2	11.5	1	23.2	2	20.0	1	7.8	0	6
West Tyrone	44.0	3	17.4	1	15.9	1	19.5	1	3.2	0	6
Total	40.1	17	20.9	9	14.7	7	14.6	5	9.7	1	40

== District results ==
=== Enniskillen ===
2014: 2 x UUP, 2 x Sinn Féin, 1 x DUP, 1 x SDLP

Enniskillen - 6 seats
Party	Candidate	FPv%	Count							
Party	Candidate	FPv%	1	2	3	4	5	6	7	8
UUP	Robert Irvine*	11.55%	778	792	982					
DUP	Keith Elliott	11.55%	778	779	794	796	1,225			
SDLP	Patricia Rodgers †	9.51%	641	710	717	803	809	814.11	1,019.11	
Sinn Féin	Tommy Maguire*	11.76%	792	801	801	868	869	869.73	963.73	
Sinn Féin	Debbie Coyle*	9.95%	670	676	676	767	767	767.73	875.73	919.89
UUP	Howard Thornton	8.10%	546	555	635	638	666	819.3	855.76	872.66
TUV	Donald Crawford	9.44%	636	640	647	648	688	779.98	797.71	802.54
Independent	Donal O'Cofaigh	8.24%	555	610	613	655	660	668.76		
DUP	Shirley Donaldson	7.47%	503	506	516	520				
Independent	Pat Cox	4.65%	313	320	322					
UUP	Basil Johnston*	4.54%	306	319						
Alliance	Ann Gormley	2.20%	148							
Green (NI)	Laurence Speight	1.05%	71							
Electorate: 12,561 Valid: 6,737 (53.63%) Spoilt: 75 Quota: 963 Turnout: 6,812 (54.23%)

=== Erne East ===
2014: 3 x Sinn Féin, 1 x UUP, 1 x DUP, 1 x SDLP

Erne East - 6 seats
Party	Candidate	FPv%	Count			
Party	Candidate	FPv%	1	2	3	4
UUP	Victor Warrington	16.20%	1,272			
DUP	Paul Robinson*	15.87%	1,246			
SDLP	Richie McPhillips †	12.93%	1,015	1,123		
Sinn Féin	Tom O'Reilly*	13.69%	1,075	1,081	1,097	1,115
Sinn Féin	Brian McCaffrey*	13.26%	1,041	1,041	1,046	1,049
Sinn Féin	Sheamus Greene*	12.80%	1,005	1,008	1,026	1,049
Sinn Féin	Kate Mulligan	11.49%	902	905	916	931
UKIP	Fred Parkinson	3.77%	296			
Electorate: 11,443 Valid: 7,852 (68.62%) Spoilt: 129 Quota: 1,122 Turnout: 7,981 (69.75%)

=== Erne North ===
2014: 2 x UUP, 1 x Sinn Féin, 1 x DUP, 1 x SDLP

Erne North - 5 seats
Party	Candidate	FPv%	Count					
Party	Candidate	FPv%	1	2	3	4	5	6
UUP	Rosemary Barton* †	20.49%	1,289					
UUP	Raymond Farrell* ‡‡	17.62%	1,108					
DUP	David Mahon	9.54%	600	690.2	940	941.4	1,326.4	
SDLP	John Coyle	9.98%	628	630.4	633.4	972.2	1,011.4	1,102.4
Sinn Féin	John Feely	14.20%	893	894	896	931	933.6	933.6
Sinn Féin	Peter Jones	10.40%	654	655	659.2	674.2	676.8	677.8
TUV	Alex Elliott	7.23%	455	548.4	569.6	572.8		
SDLP	Paul Blake	6.58%	414	419.4	420.4			
DUP	James Fleming	3.96%	249	294.6				
Electorate: 10,501 Valid: 6,290 (59.89%) Spoilt: 104 Quota: 1,049 Turnout: 6,394 (60.89%)

=== Erne West ===
2014: 2 x Sinn Féin, 1 x UUP, 1 x SDLP, 1 x Independent

Erne West - 5 seats
Party	Candidate	FPv%	Count					
Party	Candidate	FPv%	1	2	3	4	5	6
UUP	Alex Baird*	23.39%	1,619					
Independent	Bernice Swift*	17.26%	1,195					
Sinn Féin	Barry Doherty*	14.23%	985	987.48	993.09	1,567.09		
Sinn Féin	Anthony Feely	13.66%	946	946.93	956.47	1,083.41	1,465.61	
SDLP	Brendan Gallagher	13.90%	962	1,014.39	1,024.83	1,090.67	1,120.07	1,199.87
DUP	Jeremy Campbell	6.14%	425	831.1	831.37	831.37	832.21	834.73
Sinn Féin	Leanne Maguire	11.43%	791	791.43	798.47			
Electorate: 10,279 Valid: 6,923 (67.35%) Spoilt: 88 Quota: 1,154 Turnout: 7,011 (68.21%)

=== Mid Tyrone ===
2014: 4 x Sinn Féin, 1 x UUP, 1 x SDLP

Mid Tyrone - 6 seats
Party	Candidate	FPv%	Count					
Party	Candidate	FPv%	1	2	3	4	5	6
UUP	Bert Wilson*	17.13%	1,262					
Sinn Féin	Seán Clarke*	16.58%	1,222					
Sinn Féin	Ann Marie Fitzgerald*	15.13%	1,115					
Sinn Féin	Seán Donnelly*	13.42%	989	989	1,067.26			
Sinn Féin	Barry McNally	12.12%	893	893	965.66	1,011.92	1,043.56	1,069.56
SDLP	Rosemarie Shields* ‡	7.31%	539	542.91	545.43	548.55	642.98	1,030.06
DUP	Charlie Chittick*	8.54%	629	811.75	811.75	811.75	862.91	867.25
SDLP	Bernard McGrath	5.43%	400	402.21	411.31	416.47	493.05	
Green (NI)	Ciaran McClean	2.69%	198	204.12	206.36	209.06		
Alliance	Andrew Bullick	1.66%	122	130.16	131.98	132.46		
Electorate: 11,786 Valid: 7,369 (62.52%) Spoilt: 130 Quota: 1,053 Turnout: 7,499 (63.63%)

=== Omagh ===
2014: 2 x Sinn Féin, 2 x SDLP, 1 x DUP, 1 x UUP

Omagh - 6 seats
Party	Candidate	FPv%	Count						
Party	Candidate	FPv%	1	2	3	4	5	6	7
SDLP	Josephine Deehan* ‡	15.04%	946						
Sinn Féin	Sorcha McAnespy* ‡	14.82%	932						
DUP	Errol Thompson*	10.24%	644	644	644.6	664.6	664.78	1,094.78	
UUP	Chris Smyth*	10.83%	681	685	686.4	752.5	752.5	851.5	
SDLP	Joanne Donnelly ‡	6.92%	435	453	519.6	701.9	708.92	731.51	835.51
Sinn Féin	Marty McColgan*	11.80%	742	758	764	776.8	819.01	819.01	819.01
Sinn Féin	Catherine Kelly	8.84%	556	565	571.9	592.1	623.15	625.25	625.25
DUP	Adele Crawford	8.66%	545	545	545.7	576	576.36		
Alliance	Eric Bullick	5.98%	376	396	403.6				
Independent	Gabrielle McAleer	1.34%	84						
Electorate: 12,373 Valid: 5,941 (48.02%) Spoilt: 153 Quota: 849 Turnout: 6,094 (49.25%)

=== West Tyrone ===
2014: 3 x Sinn Féin, 1 x UUP, 1 x DUP, 1 x SDLP

West Tyrone - 6 seats
Party	Candidate	FPv%	Count					
Party	Candidate	FPv%	1	2	3	4	5	6
Sinn Féin	Glenn Campbell*	21.38%	1,595					
UUP	Allan Rainey*	17.39%	1,297					
Sinn Féin	Frankie Donnelly*	13.91%	1,038	1,447.53				
DUP	Mark Buchanan	12.28%	916	916	916.62	1,034.16	1,071.16	
SDLP	Mary Garrity	10.51%	784	808.09	838.78	840.76	917.34	1,216.34
Sinn Féin	Stephen McCann	8.71%	650	715.34	1,036.81	1,037.35	1,051.54	1,068.54
DUP	Elaine Thompson*	7.24%	540	540.33	540.33	626.37	661.59	662.59
SDLP	Cathal Lynch	5.36%	400	407.92	419.39	421.91	461.65	
Alliance	Stephen Donnelly	2.32%	173	180.92	189.6	196.08		
Independent	Susan-Anne White	0.90%	67					
Electorate: 11,815 Valid: 7,460 (63.14%) Spoilt: 140 Quota: 1,066 Turnout: 7,600 (64.33%)

* Incumbent

== Changes during the term ==
=== † Co-options ===
Date co-opted	Electoral Area	Party	Outgoing	Co-optee	Reason
31 May 2016	Erne East	SDLP	Richie McPhillips	Garbhan McPhillips	R McPhillips was elected to the Assembly.
2 Jun 2016	Erne North	UUP	Rosemary Barton	Diana Armstrong	Barton was elected to the Assembly.
23 Mar 2018	Enniskillen	SDLP	Patricia Rogers	Paul Blake	Rogers resigned.

=== ‡ Changes in affiliation ===
Date	Electoral Area	Name	Previous affiliation	New affiliation	Circumstance
31 Oct 2015	Erne North	Raymond Farrell	UUP	Independent	Resigned.
31 Mar 2016	Omagh	Sorcha McAnespy	Sinn Féin	Independent	Resigned.
5 Apr 2016	Omagh	Josephine Deehan	SDLP	Independent	Resigned.
11 Apr 2016	Omagh	Joanne Donnelly	SDLP	Independent	Resigned.
31 May 2016	Erne North	Raymond Farrell	Independent	DUP	Affiliated.
7 Jan 2019	Mid Tyrone	Rosemarie Shields	SDLP	Aontú	Defected.

Last updated 25 March 2019.

Current composition: see Fermanagh and Omagh District Council.
