= 2023 Fermanagh and Omagh District Council election =

Local election in Northern Ireland

- 18 May 2023

All 40 council seats 21 seats needed for a majority
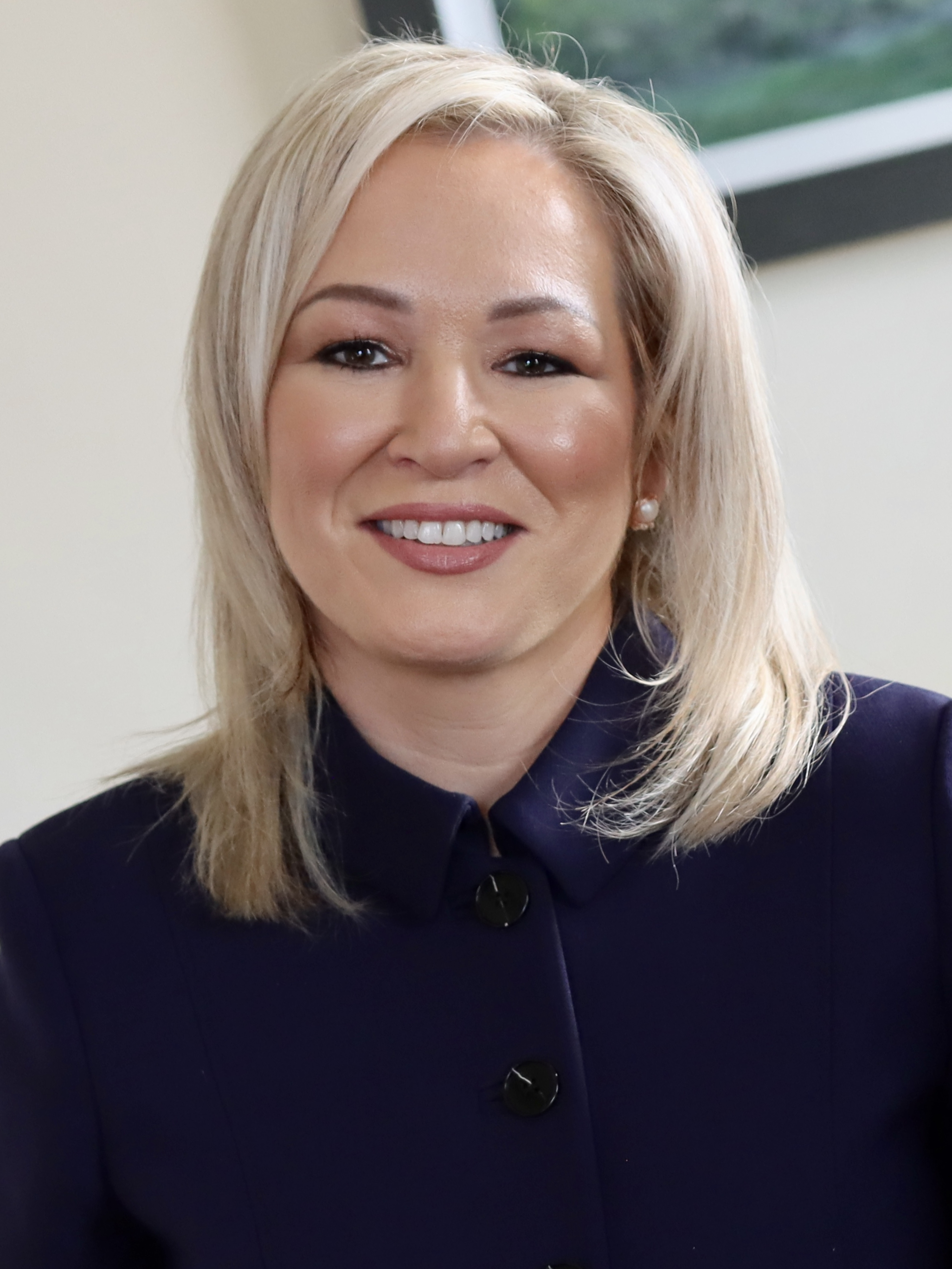

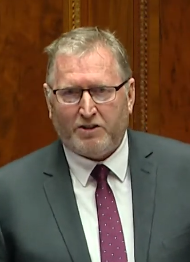

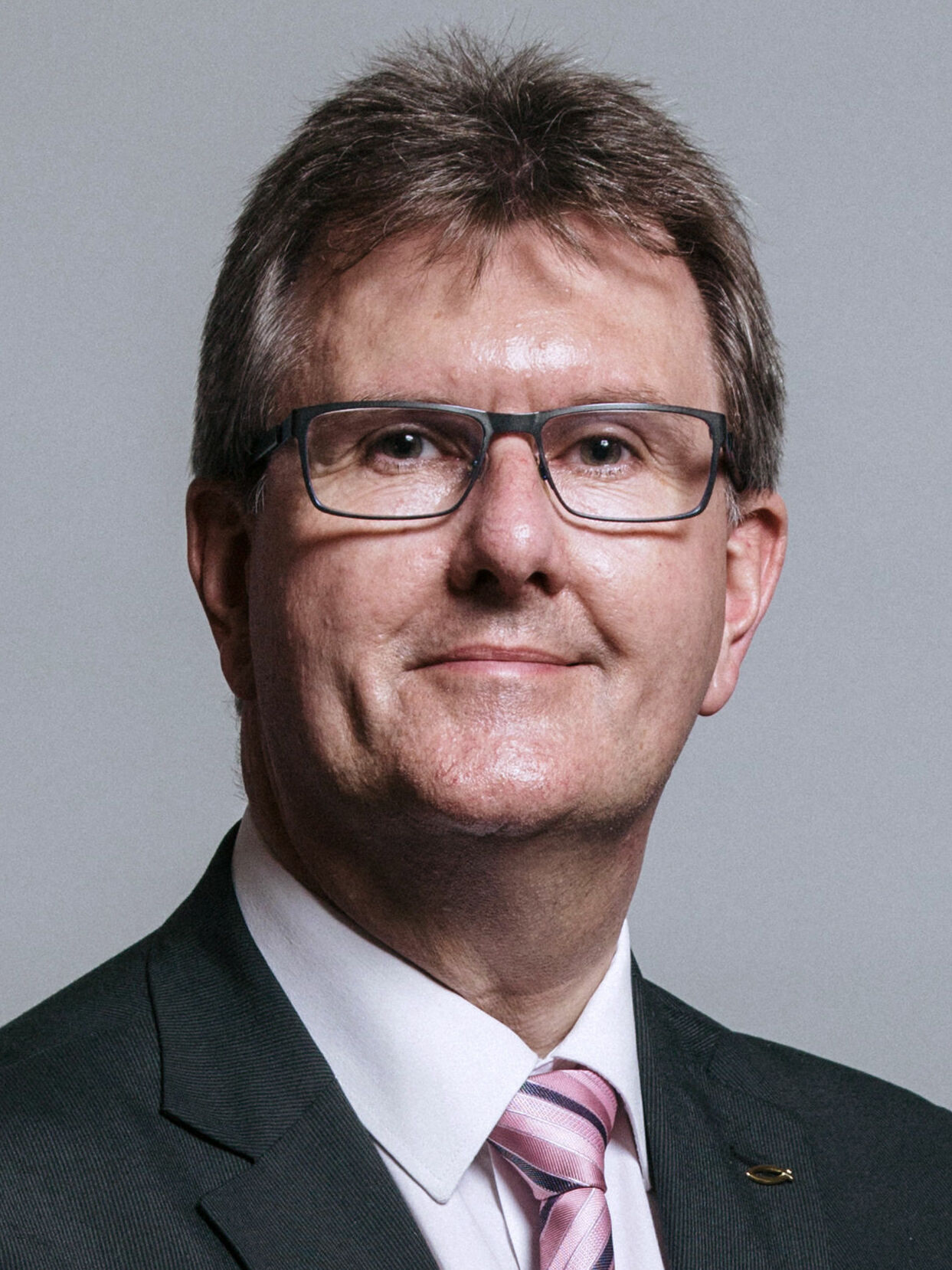

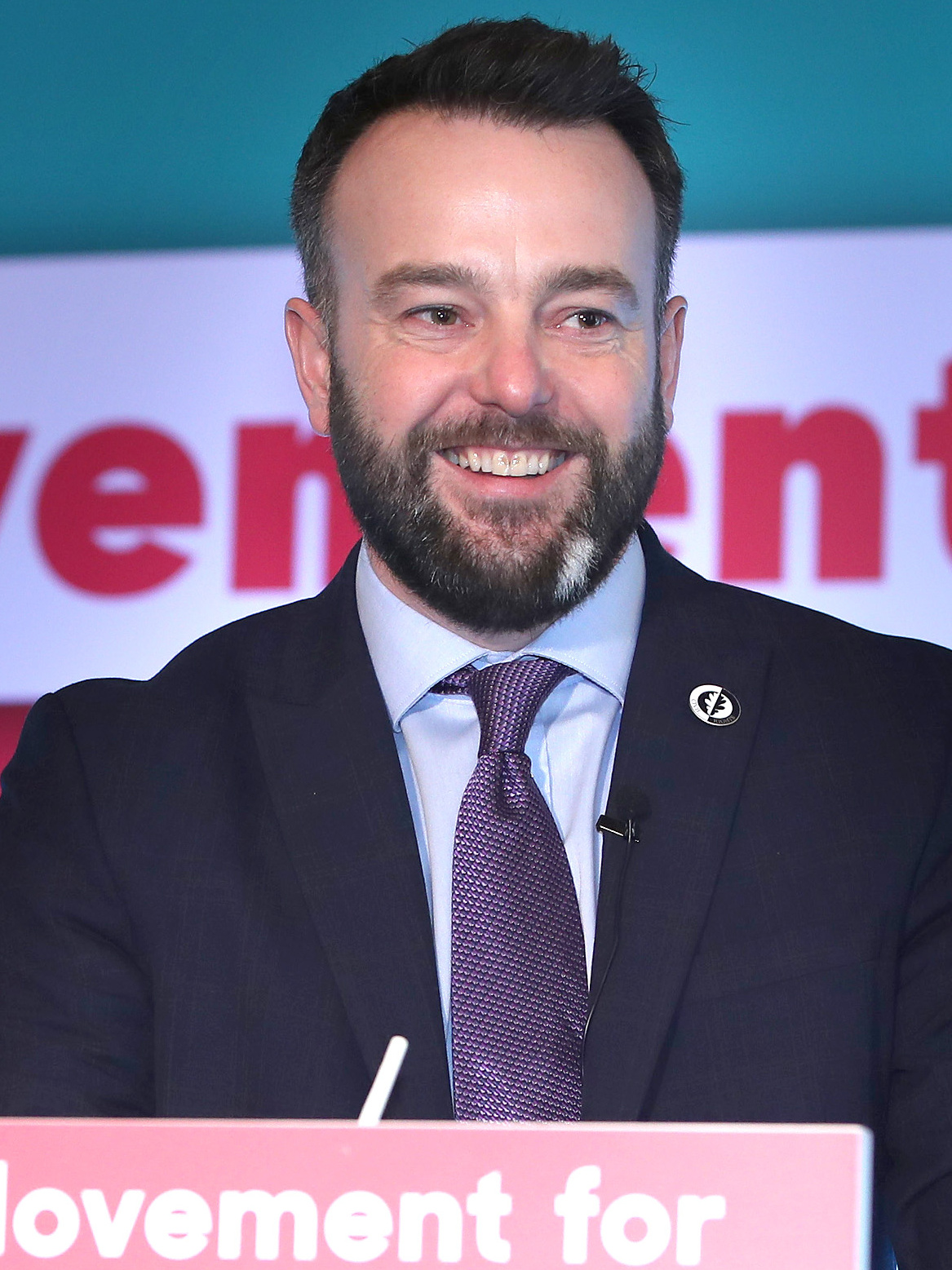

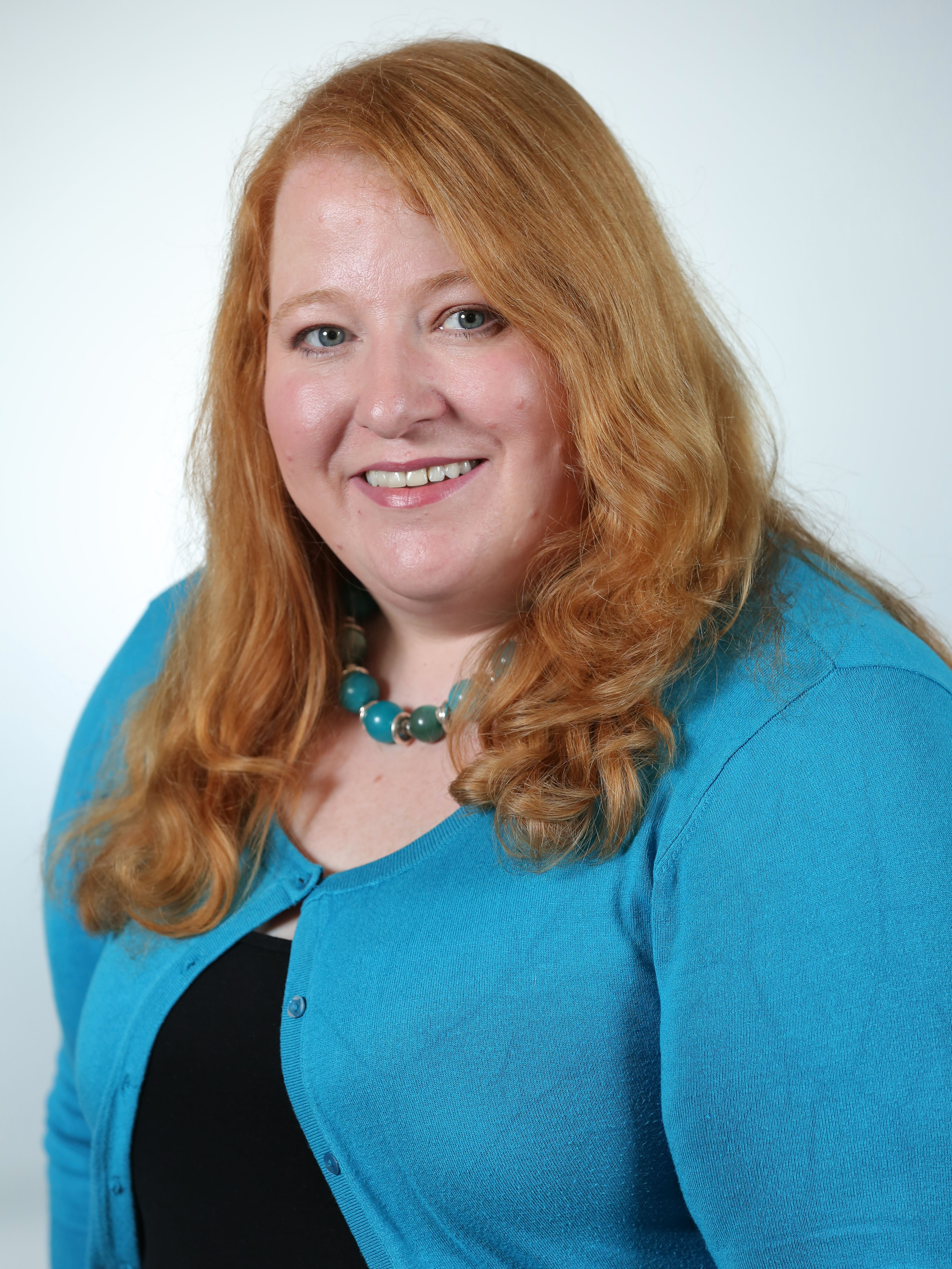
| | First party | Second party | Third party |
|---|---|---|---|
| Leader | Michelle O'Neill (Note: The leader of Sinn Féin is Mary Lou McDonald, who sits as a TD in the Irish Dáil Éireann for Dublin Central. O'Neill is the leader of the party in Northern Ireland.) | Doug Beattie | Jeffrey Donaldson |
| Party | Sinn Féin | UUP | DUP |
| Last election | 15 | 9 | 5 |
| Seats won | 21 | 7 | 6 |
| Seat change | ▲6 | ▼2 | ▲1 |
| Popular vote | 26,749 | 7,467 | 8,580 |
| Percentage | 49.24% | 13.75% | 15.80% |
| Swing | ▲12.43% | ▼2.84% | ▼0.14% |
| | Fourth party | Fifth party | Sixth party |
| Leader | Colum Eastwood | Naomi Long |
| Party | SDLP | Alliance | Independent |
| Last election | 5 | 1 | 4 |
| Seats won | 3 | 2 | 1 |
| Seat change | ▼2 | ▲1 | ▼3 |
| Popular vote | 4,283 | 3,248 | 2,482 |
| Percentage | 7.89% | 5.98% | 4.57% |
| Swing | ▼2.66% | ▲2.06% | ▼5.35% |
- Fermanagh and Omagh 2023 Council Election Results by DEA (Shaded by plurality of FPVs)
Council control before election
No overall control
Council control after election
Sinn Féin

The 2023 election to Fermanagh and Omagh District Council was held on 18 May 2023, alongside other local elections in Northern Ireland, two weeks after local elections in England. The Northern Ireland elections were delayed by 2 weeks to avoid overlapping with the coronation of King Charles III.

Voters returned 40 members to the council via Single Transferable Vote. In the elections, Sinn Féin took control of the council from no overall control.

== Election results ==
Fermanagh and Omagh District Council Election Result 2023
| Party | Seats | Gains | Losses | Net gain/loss | Seats % | Votes % | Votes | +/− |
|---|---|---|---|---|---|---|---|---|
| Sinn Féin | 21 | 6 | 0 | ▲6 | 52.50 | 49.24 | 26,749 | ▲12.43 |
| UUP | 7 | 0 | 2 | ▼2 | 17.50 | 13.75 | 7,467 | ▼2.84 |
| DUP | 6 | 1 | 0 | ▲1 | 15.00 | 15.80 | 8,580 | ▼0.14 |
| SDLP | 3 | 1 | 3 | ▼2 | 7.50 | 7.89 | 4,283 | ▼2.66 |
| Alliance | 2 | 1 | 0 | ▲1 | 5.00 | 5.98 | 3,248 | ▲2.06 |
| Independent | 1 | 0 | 3 | ▼3 | 2.50 | 4.57 | 2,482 | ▼5.35 |
| TUV | 0 | 0 | 0 | 0 | 0.0 | 1.71 | 931 | ▼0.36 |
| Labour Alternative | 0 | 0 | 1 | ▼1 | 0.0 | 0.93 | 504 | ▼0.46 |
| Total | 40 | | | | | | 54,319 | |

Note: "Votes" are the first preference votes.

- The electorate was 87,488 the turnout was 62.89% (55,021) and there were 702 spoiled votes.

== Districts summary ==
Results of the 2023 Fermanagh and Omagh District Council election by district
| District Electoral Area (DEA) | % | Cllrs | % | Cllrs | % | Cllrs | % | Cllrs | % | Cllrs | % | Cllrs | Total cllrs |
| District Electoral Area (DEA) | Sinn Féin | | UUP | | DUP | | SDLP | | Alliance | | Independents and others | | Total cllrs |
|---|---|---|---|---|---|---|---|---|---|---|---|---|---|
| Enniskillen | 34.52 | 2 ▲1 | 16.01 | 2 | 19.10 | 1 | 7.02 | 0 ▼1 | 10.15 | 1 ▲1 | 13.20 | 0 ▼1 | 6 |
| Erne East | 52.33 | 3 ▲1 | 13.15 | 1 | 16.63 | 1 | 5.87 | 1 | 2.61 | 0 | 9.42 | 0 ▼1 | 6 |
| Erne North | 33.99 | 2 ▲1 | 27.06 | 2 | 16.94 | 1 | 11.03 | 0 ▼1 | 5.04 | 0 | 5.94 | 0 | 5 |
| Erne West | 54.19 | 3 ▲1 | 15.78 | 1 | 9.06 | 0 | 11.01 | 1 | 3.30 | 0 | 6.67 | 0 ▼1 | 5 |
| Mid Tyrone | 62.77 | 4 | 8.04 | 0 ▼1 | 12.37 | 1 ▲1 | 5.82 | 1 ▲1 | 3.64 | 0 | 7.36 | 0 ▼1 | 6 |
| Omagh | 47.14 | 3 ▲1 | 7.37 | 0 ▼1 | 17.15 | 1 | 5.80 | 0 | 13.14 | 1 | 9.41 | 1 | 6 |
| West Tyrone | 56.02 | 4 ▲1 | 9.99 | 1 | 19.50 | 1 | 8.99 | 0 ▼1 | 5.51 | 0 | 0.00 | 0 | 6 |
| Total | 49.24 | 21 ▲6 | 13.75 | 7 ▼2 | 15.80 | 6 ▲1 | 7.89 | 3 ▼2 | 5.98 | 2 ▲1 | 7.21 | 1 ▼4 | 40 |

== District results ==
=== Enniskillen ===
2019: 2 x UUP, 1 x Sinn Féin, 1 x DUP, 1 x SDLP, 1 x Cross-Community Labour Alternative

2023: 2 x UUP, 2 x Sinn Féin, 1 x DUP, 1 x Alliance

2019–2023 Change: Sinn Féin and Alliance gain from SDLP and Cross-Community Labour Alternative

Enniskillen - 6 seats
| Party | Candidate | FPv% | Count | | | | | | | | |
| Party | Candidate | FPv% | 1 | 2 | 3 | 4 | 5 | 6 | 7 | 8 | 9 |
|---|---|---|---|---|---|---|---|---|---|---|---|
| DUP | Keith Elliott* † | 13.41% | 1,029 | 1,412 | | | | | | | |
| Alliance | Eddie Roofe | 10.15% | 779 | 783 | 789.8 | 953.8 | 1,257.8 | | | | |
| Sinn Féin | Tommy Maguire* | 13.34% | 1,024 | 1,024 | 1,024 | 1,091 | 1,135 | | | | |
| UUP | Roy Crawford* | 8.69% | 667 | 674 | 752.2 | 766.2 | 784.2 | 810.12 | 810.12 | 1,130.43 | |
| Sinn Féin | Dermot Browne | 11.02% | 846 | 846 | 846 | 879 | 1,003 | 1,057.72 | 1,074.21 | 1,077.17 | 1,077.17 |
| UUP | Robert Irvine* | 7.32% | 562 | 580 | 673.5 | 684.5 | 701.5 | 720.7 | 721.67 | 995.32 | 1,028.47 |
| Sinn Féin | Andrea McManus | 10.16% | 780 | 780 | 780 | 817 | 884 | 941.6 | 961.97 | 963.97 | 963.97 |
| TUV | Donald Crawford | 6.63% | 509 | 531 | 665.3 | 668.3 | 680.3 | 683.18 | 683.18 | | |
| SDLP | Paul Blake* | 7.02% | 539 | 539 | 539 | 663 | | | | | |
| Labour Alternative | Donal O'Cofaigh* | 6.57% | 504 | 506 | 507.7 | | | | | | |
| DUP | Jill Mahon | 5.69% | 437 | | | | | | | | |
Electorate: 13,642 Valid: 7,676 (56.27%) Spoilt: 99 Quota: 1,097 Turnout: 7,775 (56.99%)

=== Erne East ===
2019: 2 x Sinn Féin, 1 x DUP, 1 x UUP, 1 x SDLP, 1 x Independent

2023: 3 x Sinn Féin, 1 x DUP, 1 x UUP, 1 x SDLP

2019–2023 Change: Sinn Féin gain from Independent

Erne East - 6 seats
| Party | Candidate | FPv% | Count | | | | | | |
| Party | Candidate | FPv% | 1 | 2 | 3 | 4 | 5 | 6 | 7 |
|---|---|---|---|---|---|---|---|---|---|
| Sinn Féin | Sheamus Greene* | 20.68% | 1,753 | | | | | | |
| DUP | Paul Robinson* | 16.63% | 1,410 | | | | | | |
| Sinn Féin | Thomas O'Reilly* | 16.36% | 1,387 | | | | | | |
| Sinn Féin | Noeleen Hayes | 15.29% | 1,296 | | | | | | |
| UUP | Victor Warrington* | 13.15% | 1,115 | 1,118.08 | 1,309.46 | | | | |
| SDLP | Garbhan McPhillips* ‡ | 5.87% | 498 | 747.48 | 748.46 | 824.36 | 855.02 | 893.94 | 1,145.86 |
| Independent | Eamon Keenan* | 6.61% | 560 | 719.39 | 719.81 | 760.61 | 764.81 | 794.35 | 1,068.17 |
| Alliance | Richard Bullick | 2.61% | 221 | 277.98 | 278.98 | 298.78 | 352.68 | 363.18 | |
| Independent | Tina McDermott | 2.81% | 238 | 307.30 | 307.44 | 345.24 | 348.88 | 351.82 | |
Electorate: 12,127 Valid: 8,478 (69.91%) Spoilt: 110 Quota: 1,212 Turnout: 8,588 (70.82%)

=== Erne North ===
2019: 2 x UUP, 1 x Sinn Féin, 1 x DUP, 1 x SDLP

2023: 2 x Sinn Féin, 2 x UUP, 1 x DUP

2019–2023 Change: Sinn Féin gain from SDLP

Erne North - 5 seats
| Party | Candidate | FPv% | Count | | | | | |
| Party | Candidate | FPv% | 1 | 2 | 3 | 4 | 5 | 6 |
|---|---|---|---|---|---|---|---|---|
| Sinn Féin | Debbie Coyle* | 21.99% | 1,561 | | | | | |
| UUP | Diana Armstrong* † | 19.61% | 1,392 | | | | | |
| DUP | David Mahon | 13.86% | 984 | 984.24 | 1,009.44 | 1,184.20 | | |
| Sinn Féin | John Feely | 12.00% | 852 | 1,181.76 | 1,181.76 | 1,181.76 | 1,210.76 | |
| UUP | John McClaughry* | 7.45% | 529 | 529 | 673.34 | 699.58 | 771.68 | 1,146.04 |
| SDLP | John Coyle* | 11.03% | 783 | 815.16 | 818.66 | 818.66 | 1,023.54 | 1,034.48 |
| TUV | Alex Elliott | 5.94% | 422 | 422.24 | 433.72 | 453.14 | 461.42 | |
| Alliance | Eric Bullick | 5.04% | 358 | 366.16 | 370.36 | 370.36 | | |
| DUP | Paul Stevenson* | 3.08% | 219 | 219.24 | 224.70 | | | |
Electorate: 11,509 Valid: 7,100 (61.69%) Spoilt: 93 Quota: 1,184 Turnout: 7,193 (62.46%)

=== Erne West ===
2019: 2 x Sinn Féin, 1 x UUP, 1 x SDLP, 1 x Independent

2023: 3 x Sinn Féin, 1 x UUP, 1 x SDLP

2019–2023 Change: Sinn Féin gain from Independent

Erne West - 5 seats
| Party | Candidate | FPv% | Count | | | | |
| Party | Candidate | FPv% | 1 | 2 | 3 | 4 | 5 |
|---|---|---|---|---|---|---|---|
| Sinn Féin | Anthony Feely* | 19.68% | 1,493 | | | | |
| Sinn Féin | Elaine Brough | 17.95% | 1,362 | | | | |
| Sinn Féin | Declan McArdle | 16.56% | 1,256 | 1,426.40 | | | |
| SDLP | Adam Gannon* | 11.01% | 835 | 869.35 | 1,005.55 | 1,053.40 | 1,313.40 |
| UUP | Mark Ovens | 15.78% | 1,197 | 1,198.35 | 1,250.35 | 1,250.95 | 1,273.95 |
| DUP | Aaron Elliott | 9.06% | 687 | 687.90 | 692.90 | 693.05 | 699.05 |
| Independent | Paul McColdrick | 6.67% | 506 | 517.85 | 555.15 | 580.65 | |
| Alliance | Gerard McCusker | 3.30% | 250 | 251.95 | | | |
Electorate: 11,196 Valid: 7,586 (67.76%) Spoilt: 66 Quota: 1,265 Turnout: 7,652 (68.35%)

=== Mid Tyrone ===
2019: 4 x Sinn Féin, 1 x UUP, 1 x Independent

2023: 4 x Sinn Féin, 1 x DUP, 1 x SDLP

2019–2023 Change: DUP and SDLP gain from UUP and Independent

Mid Tyrone - 6 seats
| Party | Candidate | FPv% | Count | | | | | | | |
| Party | Candidate | FPv% | 1 | 2 | 3 | 4 | 5 | 6 | 7 | 8 |
|---|---|---|---|---|---|---|---|---|---|---|
| Sinn Féin | Pádraigín Kelly* | 18.98% | 1,621 | | | | | | | |
| Sinn Féin | Roisin Devine Gallagher | 17.14% | 1,464 | | | | | | | |
| Sinn Féin | Anne Marie Fitzgerald* † | 14.10% | 1,204 | 1,535.68 | | | | | | |
| Sinn Féin | Patrick Withers* | 12.55% | 1,072 | 1,097.20 | 1,359.52 | | | | | |
| DUP | Shirley Hawkes | 12.37% | 1,057 | 1,057.48 | 1,057.48 | 1,061.44 | 1,071.44 | 1,071.44 | 1,667.44 | |
| SDLP | Bernard McGrath | 5.82% | 497 | 505.88 | 517.40 | 619.92 | 786.60 | 825.00 | 891.24 | 1,087.24 |
| Independent | Emmet McAleer* | 7.36% | 629 | 646.28 | 656.84 | 739.12 | 812.76 | 843.00 | 867.92 | 946.92 |
| UUP | Rosemary Barton* | 8.04% | 687 | 687.00 | 687.24 | 689.00 | 735.24 | 737.88 | | |
| Alliance | Matthew Beaumont | 3.64% | 311 | 313.88 | 319.40 | 371.76 | | | | |
Electorate: 13,083 Valid: 8,542 (65.29%) Spoilt: 119 Quota: 1,221 Turnout: 8,661 (66.20%)

=== Omagh ===
2019: 2 x Sinn Féin, 1 x DUP, 1 x UUP, 1 x Alliance, 1 x Independent

2023: 3 x Sinn Féin, 1 x DUP, 1 x Alliance, 1 x Independent

2019–2023 Change: Sinn Féin gain from UUP

Omagh - 6 seats
| Party | Candidate | FPv% | Count | | | | | | |
| Party | Candidate | FPv% | 1 | 2 | 3 | 4 | 5 | 6 | 7 |
|---|---|---|---|---|---|---|---|---|---|
| Sinn Féin | Barry McElduff* | 20.22% | 1,342 | | | | | | |
| DUP | Errol Thompson* | 17.15% | 1,138 | | | | | | |
| Sinn Féin | Catherine Kelly | 15.27% | 1,013 | | | | | | |
| Sinn Féin | Marty McColgan | 11.65% | 773 | 1,073.44 | | | | | |
| Alliance | Stephen Donnelly* | 13.14% | 872 | 899.84 | 903.92 | 958.92 | | | |
| Independent | Josephine Deehan* | 7.07% | 469 | 492.20 | 494.58 | 545.49 | 582.01 | 601.81 | 940.60 |
| UUP | Matthew Bell* | 7.37% | 489 | 489.29 | 668.13 | 673.47 | 674.79 | 675.23 | 695.14 |
| SDLP | Brenda Mellon | 5.80% | 385 | 410.81 | 412.34 | 437.67 | 520.61 | 561.97 | |
| Independent | Kathy Dunphy | 1.21% | 80 | 85.22 | 85.90 | | | | |
| Socialist Party | Amy Ferguson | 1.13% | 75 | 76.74 | 77.08 | | | | |
Electorate: 13,279 Valid: 6,636 (49.97%) Spoilt: 103 Quota: 949 Turnout: 6,739 (50.75%)

=== West Tyrone ===
2019: 3 x Sinn Féin, 1 x DUP, 1 x UUP, 1 x SDLP

2023: 4 x Sinn Féin, 1 x DUP, 1 x UUP

2019–2023 Change: Sinn Féin gain from SDLP

West Tyrone - 6 seats
| Party | Candidate | FPv% | Count | | | |
| Party | Candidate | FPv% | 1 | 2 | 3 | 4 |
|---|---|---|---|---|---|---|
| DUP | Mark Buchanan* | 19.50% | 1,619 | | | |
| Sinn Féin | Glenn Campbell* | 15.41% | 1,279 | | | |
| UUP | Allan Rainey* | 9.99% | 829 | 1,232.38 | | |
| Sinn Féin | Ann-Marie Donnelly* | 13.60% | 1,129 | 1,129.81 | 1,174.81 | 1,209.74 |
| Sinn Féin | Colette McNulty | 13.84% | 1,149 | 1,151.43 | 1,163.43 | 1,171.20 |
| Sinn Féin | Stephen McCann* | 13.17% | 1,093 | 1,093.00 | 1,112.00 | 1,153.16 |
| SDLP | Mary Garrity* | 8.99% | 746 | 750.32 | 1,044.45 | 1,049.77 |
| Alliance | Joyce Donnelly | 5.51% | 457 | 465.91 | | |
Electorate: 12,652 Valid: 8,301 (65.61%) Spoilt: 112 Quota: 1,186 Turnout: 8,413 (66.50%)

=== † Co-options ===
| Date co-opted | Electoral Area | Party | Outgoing | Co-optee | Reason |
|---|---|---|---|---|---|
| 21 October 2024 | Erne North | UUP | Diana Armstrong | Rosemary Barton | Armstrong was co-opted to the Northern Ireland Assembly. |
| 27 August 2025 | Mid Tyrone | Sinn Féin | Ann-Marie Fitzgerald | Ruaídhrí Lyttle | Fitzgerald resigned. |
| 12 September 2025 | Enniskillen | DUP | Keith Elliot | Aaron Elliott | Elliot resigned. |

=== ‡ Changes in affiliation ===
| Date | Electoral Area | Name | Previous affiliation | New affiliation | Circumstance |
|---|---|---|---|---|---|
| 2 October 2025 | Erne East | Garbhán McPhillips | SDLP | Independent | Left the SDLP due to concerns over the party atmosphere. |
