= Deborah Erskine =

Northern Irish politician

Deborah Erskine MLA
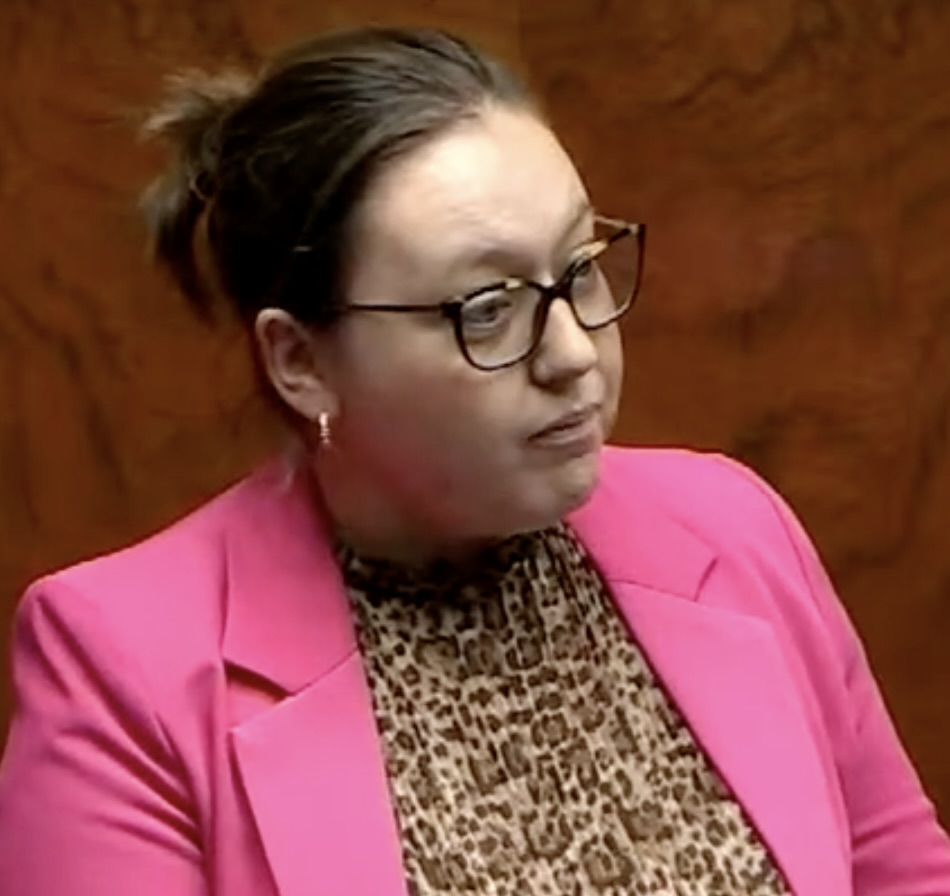
- Erskine in 2024

Member of the Legislative Assembly for Fermanagh and South Tyrone
- Incumbent
- Assumed office 11 October 2021
- Preceded by: Arlene Foster

Member of Fermanagh and Omagh District Council
- In office 2 May 2019 – 11 October 2021
- Preceded by: David Mahon
- Succeeded by: Paul Stevenson
- Constituency: Erne North

Personal details
- Born: Deborah Armstrong; 1992 (age 33–34) Enniskillen, County Fermanagh, Northern Ireland
- Party: Democratic Unionist Party
- Spouse: Robert Erskine
- Occupation: Politician
- Profession: Journalist

Deborah Erskine (born 1992; née Armstrong) is a Democratic Unionist Party (DUP) politician from Northern Ireland. She was elected as a councillor for Erne North in the 2019 Fermanagh and Omagh District Council election, and has been a Member of the Legislative Assembly (MLA) for Fermanagh and South Tyrone since 11 October 2021. Erskine is the DUP Spokesperson for Promoting the Union with Young People and New Communities.

== Career ==
Before becoming a politician, Deborah Armstrong worked as a journalist. Her first role was a reporter for the Ulster Herald, a weekly newspaper based in Omagh. She then became a press officer for the DUP, before working in Arlene Foster's constituency office.

=== Council ===
Armstrong was elected to Fermanagh and Omagh District Council in the 2019 election, for the Erne North electoral area, ranking sixth out of ten candidates on first preference votes. She unseated incumbent DUP councillor David Mahon once all vote transfers had been completed. Arlene Foster was named as her election agent. She had been considered a favourite for chairperson of the council in 2021 following the end of Diana Armstrong's term, however the role went to Errol Thompson of the DUP.

Armstrong (Erskine following her marriage in late 2019) was supportive of Arlene Foster when DUP MLAs and MPs signed a letter of no confidence in her leadership. Along with Mid Ulster District Council councillor Kim Ashton, she criticised Christopher Stalford's handling of the fallout. Following Foster's resignation as leader, and the subsequent leadership election, Erskine was critical of Foster's removal, with her constituency group saying it was "not done in our name". She was thought to be supportive of Paul Bell, Ashton's father, who left the party following Poots's election.

=== MLA ===
Foster announced her resignation as MLA for Fermanagh and South Tyrone on 7 September 2021. A month later, on 7 October, Erskine was announced to have been co-opted to replace Foster, and became MLA on 11 October 2021. Erskine used her acceptance speech to praise Foster, saying that "[h]er dedication to Fermanagh and South Tyrone has been unstinting. I thank Arlene for her unwavering encouragement to me, and I know that will continue." Her seat on Fermanagh and Omagh District Council was filled by Paul Stevenson. Erskine is a member of the Committee for Health in the Assembly.

In the 2022 Assembly election, Erskine was elected to a full term with 5,272 first preference votes. She was elected in the eighth count with 6695.3 votes. She stated, in her acceptance speech, that Foster "should be here today for re-election and I want to pay tribute to her for her work and dedication to this constituency and indeed, Northern Ireland."

== Personal life ==
Erskine married Robert Erskine on 31 October 2019.
