= 2011 Fermanagh District Council election =

Local government election in Northern Ireland

- 5 May 2011

All 23 seats to Fermanagh District Council 12 seats needed for a majority
| | First party | Second party | Third party |
|---|---|---|---|
| Party | Sinn Féin | UUP | DUP |
| Seats won | 9 | 6 | 4 |
| Seat change | 0 | ▲1 | 0 |
| | Fourth party | Fifth party |
| Party | SDLP | Independent |
| Seats won | 3 | 1 |
| Seat change | ▼2 | ▲1 |
- Fermanagh 2011 District Council election results by district

Elections to Fermanagh District Council were held on 5 May 2011 on the same day as the other Northern Irish local government elections. The election used four district electoral areas to elect a total of 23 councillors.

== Election results ==
Fermanagh District Council Election Result 2011
| Party | Seats | Gains | Losses | Net gain/loss | Seats % | Votes % | Votes | +/− |
|---|---|---|---|---|---|---|---|---|
| Sinn Féin | 9 | 1 | 1 | 0 | 39.1 | 36.6 | 11,276 | ▲0.8 |
| UUP | 6 | 1 | 0 | ▲1 | 26.1 | 24.0 | 7,396 | ▲2.0 |
| DUP | 4 | 0 | 0 | 0 | 17.4 | 17.3 | 5,332 | ▼3.3 |
| SDLP | 3 | 0 | 1 | ▼1 | 13.0 | 12.5 | 3,867 | ▼5.5 |
| Independent | 1 | 1 | 0 | ▲1 | 4.3 | 7.2 | 2,226 | ▲6.8 |
| TUV | 0 | 0 | 0 | 0 | 0.0 | 1.0 | 309 | New |
| Socialist Party | 0 | 0 | 0 | 0 | 0.0 | 0.8 | 248 | New |
| Alliance | 0 | 0 | 0 | 0 | 0.0 | 0.4 | 119 | ▲0.4 |
| Green (NI) | 0 | 0 | 0 | 0 | 0.0 | 0.2 | 63 | ▼0.1 |

Note: "Votes" are the first preference votes.

== Districts summary ==
Results of the Fermanagh District Council election, 2011 by district
| Ward | % | Cllrs | % | Cllrs | % | Cllrs | % | Cllrs | % | Cllrs | Total Cllrs |
| Ward | Sinn Féin | | UUP | | DUP | | SDLP | | Others | | Total Cllrs |
|---|---|---|---|---|---|---|---|---|---|---|---|
| Enniskillen | 24.9 | 2 | 25.9 | 2 | 22.6 | 1 | 15.1 | 1 | 11.5 | 0 | 7 |
| Erne East | 55.2 | 4 | 18.8 | 1 | 15.7 | 1 | 6.1 | 0 | 4.2 | 2 | 6 |
| Erne North | 21.5 | 1 | 34.1 | 2 | 21.5 | 1 | 12.9 | 1 | 10.0 | 0 | 5 |
| Erne West | 40.6 | 2 | 19.2 | 1 | 9.6 | 0 | 17.0 | 1 | 13.6 | 1 | 5 |
| Total | 36.6 | 9 | 24.0 | 6 | 17.3 | 4 | 12.5 | 3 | 9.6 | 1 | 23 |

== District results ==
=== Enniskillen ===
2005: 2 x Sinn Féin, 2 x DUP, 2 x SDLP, 1 x UUP
2011: 2 x UUP, 2 x Sinn Féin, 2 x DUP, 1 x SDLP
2005-2011 Change: UUP gain from SDLP

Enniskillen - 7 seats
| Party | Candidate | FPv% | Count | | | | | | | | |
| Party | Candidate | FPv% | 1 | 2 | 3 | 4 | 5 | 6 | 7 | 8 | 9 |
|---|---|---|---|---|---|---|---|---|---|---|---|
| UUP | Robert Irvine* | 13.46% | 1,104 | | | | | | | | |
| DUP | Alison Brimstone | 12.32% | 1,011 | 1,015.34 | 1,026.34 | | | | | | |
| Sinn Féin | Seán Lynch | 11.93% | 979 | 979.07 | 992.07 | 1,023.07 | 1,147.07 | | | | |
| Sinn Féin | Debbie Coyle | 8.42% | 691 | 691 | 696 | 726 | 961 | 1,071 | | | |
| UUP | Basil Johnston | 6.39% | 524 | 581.75 | 597.82 | 605.82 | 605.82 | 605.82 | 605.82 | 1,019.5 | 1,025.64 |
| DUP | Cyril Brownlee | 10.32% | 847 | 849.38 | 851.52 | 858.52 | 859.52 | 859.52 | 859.52 | 922.85 | 928.85 |
| SDLP | Frank Britton* | 8.34% | 684 | 684.28 | 724.28 | 766.28 | 772.28 | 776.28 | 786.28 | 796.42 | 903.42 |
| SDLP | Patricia Rodgers* | 6.75% | 554 | 554.14 | 603.21 | 661.21 | 667.21 | 670.21 | 685.21 | 693.35 | 902.35 |
| Independent | Pat Cox* | 5.56% | 456 | 456.13 | 470.14 | 513.14 | 526.14 | 529.14 | 545.14 | 546.14 | |
| UUP | Howard Thornton | 6.03% | 495 | 505.85 | 515.99 | 520.99 | 520.99 | 520.99 | 521.99 | | |
| Sinn Féin | Ciaran May | 4.57% | 375 | 375 | 383 | 398 | | | | | |
| Socialist Party | Donal O'Cofaigh | 3.02% | 248 | 248 | 280 | | | | | | |
| Alliance | Kevin Chaffey | 1.45% | 119 | 119.49 | | | | | | | |
| Green (NI) | Laurence Speight | 0.77% | 63 | 63.07 | | | | | | | |
| Independent | Fidelma Leonard | 0.66% | 54 | 54.07 | | | | | | | |
Electorate: 13,409 Valid: 8,204 (61.18%) Spoilt: 167 Quota: 1,026 Turnout: 8,371 (62.32%)

=== Erne East ===
2005: 3 x Sinn Féin, 1 x UUP, 1 x DUP, 1 x SDLP
2011: 4 x Sinn Féin, 1 x UUP, 1 x DUP
2005-2011 Change: Sinn Féin gain from SDLP

Erne East - 6 seats
| Party | Candidate | FPv% | Count | | | | |
| Party | Candidate | FPv% | 1 | 2 | 3 | 4 | 5 |
|---|---|---|---|---|---|---|---|
| Sinn Féin | Ruth Lynch* | 17.88% | 1,564 | | | | |
| DUP | Paul Robinson* | 15.66% | 1,370 | | | | |
| Sinn Féin | Brian McCaffrey* | 12.30% | 1,076 | 1,238.2 | 1,331.2 | | |
| Sinn Féin | Tom O'Reilly* | 12.75% | 1,115 | 1,167.8 | 1,275.8 | | |
| Sinn Féin | Sheamus Greene | 12.28% | 1,074 | 1,127.6 | 1,184.8 | 1,184.8 | 1,230.8 |
| UUP | Harold Andrews* | 12.89% | 1,127 | 1,127.2 | 1,130.2 | 1,198.24 | 1,198.24 |
| SDLP | Rosemary Flanagan | 6.06% | 530 | 550.8 | 603.4 | 604.3 | 613.3 |
| UUP | Victor Warrington | 5.87% | 513 | 513.2 | 517.2 | 558.51 | 559.51 |
| Independent | Gerry McHugh* | 4.31% | 377 | 391.2 | | | |
Electorate: 11,720 Valid: 8,746 (74.62%) Spoilt: 181 Quota: 1,250 Turnout: 8,927 (76.17%)

=== Erne North ===
2005: 2 x UUP, 1 x DUP, 1 x Sinn Féin, 1 x SDLP
2011: 2 x UUP, 1 x DUP, 1 x Sinn Féin, 1 x SDLP
2005-2011 Change: No change

Erne North - 5 seats
| Party | Candidate | FPv% | Count | | | | | | | |
| Party | Candidate | FPv% | 1 | 2 | 3 | 4 | 5 | 6 | 7 | 8 |
|---|---|---|---|---|---|---|---|---|---|---|
| Sinn Féin | Phil Flanagan* | 21.49% | 1,388 | | | | | | | |
| UUP | Raymond Farrell | 17.17% | 1,109 | | | | | | | |
| UUP | Rosemary Barton | 12.89% | 833 | 833.34 | 1,013.68 | 1,131.68 | | | | |
| SDLP | John O'Kane* | 7.18% | 464 | 631.62 | 634.62 | 639.62 | 640.26 | 641.49 | 718.59 | 1,119.77 |
| DUP | Bert Johnston* | 12.43% | 803 | 806.06 | 842.06 | 962.06 | 994.06 | 1,012.51 | 1,021.54 | 1,033.34 |
| DUP | Ray Carscadden | 9.09% | 587 | 588.02 | 600.02 | 639.02 | 660.78 | 668.10 | 671.13 | 677.16 |
| SDLP | John Coyle | 5.73% | 370 | 436.64 | 437.98 | 441.32 | 441.32 | 441.68 | 654.65 | |
| Independent | Gerry Ferguson | 5.19% | 335 | 405.04 | 406.04 | 411.04 | 411.04 | 411.25 | | |
| TUV | Alex Elliott | 4.78% | 309 | 309.68 | 331.68 | | | | | |
| UUP | David Black | 4.06% | 262 | 262.68 | | | | | | |
Electorate: 9,454 Valid: 6,460 (68.33%) Spoilt: 141 Quota: 1,077 Turnout: 6,601 (69.82%)

=== Erne West ===
2005: 3 x Sinn Féin, 1 x UUP, 1 x SDLP
2011: 2 x Sinn Féin, 1 x UUP, 1 x SDLP, 1 x Independent
2005-2011 Change: Independent leaves Sinn Féin

Erne West - 5 seats
| Party | Candidate | FPv% | Count | | | |
| Party | Candidate | FPv% | 1 | 2 | 3 | 4 |
|---|---|---|---|---|---|---|
| SDLP | Brendan Gallagher | 17.04% | 1,265 | | | |
| UUP | Alex Baird* | 16.95% | 1,259 | | | |
| Sinn Féin | Frankie Rice | 14.79% | 1,098 | 1,101 | 1,636 | |
| Sinn Féin | Barry Doherty | 15.61% | 1,159 | 1,159 | 1,274 | |
| Independent | Bernice Swift* | 13.52% | 1,004 | 1,010 | 1,078 | 1,224 |
| DUP | Alan Hassard | 9.61% | 714 | 846 | 847 | 850 |
| Sinn Féin | Stephen Huggett* | 10.19% | 757 | 757 | | |
| UUP | Ruth Wilson | 2.29% | 170 | | | |
Electorate: 10,250 Valid: 7,426 (72.45%) Spoilt: 160 Quota: 1,238 Turnout: 7,586 (74.01%)
