= Erne East (District Electoral Area) =

District electoral area in Northern Ireland

- Fermanagh and Omagh District Council DEA constituency

Current constituency
- Created: 1985
- Seats: 6 (1985-)
- Councillors: Sheamus Greene (SF); Noeleen Hayes (SF); Garbhan McPhillips (IND); Tom O'Reilly (SF); Paul Robinson (DUP); Victor Warrington (UUP)

Erne East DEA within Fermanagh and Omagh

Erne East DEA (1993-2014) within Fermanagh

Erne East is one of the seven district electoral areas (DEA) in Fermanagh and Omagh, Northern Ireland. The district elects six members to Fermanagh and Omagh District Council and contains the wards of Brookeborough, Donagh, Lisnaskea, Maguiresbridge, Newtownbutler and Rosslea. Erne East forms part of the Fermanagh and South Tyrone constituencies for the Northern Ireland Assembly and UK Parliament.

It was created for the 1985 local elections, replacing Fermanagh Area A and Fermanagh Area B which had existed since 1973, where it originally contained six wards (Brookeborough, Donagh, Lisnaskea, Maguires Bridge, Newtownbutler and Rosslea).

== Councillors ==
Election	Councillor (Party)	Councillor (Party)	Councillor (Party)	Councillor (Party)	Councillor (Party)	Councillor (Party)
October 2025 Defection	Sheamus Greene (Sinn Féin)	Tom O'Reilly (Sinn Féin)	Noeleen Hayes (Sinn Féin)	Garbhan McPhillips (SDLP)/ (Independent)	Victor Warrington (UUP)	Paul Robinson (DUP)
2023	Sheamus Greene (Sinn Féin)	Tom O'Reilly (Sinn Féin)	Noeleen Hayes (Sinn Féin)	Garbhan McPhillips (SDLP)/ (Independent)	Victor Warrington (UUP)	Paul Robinson (DUP)
March 2020 Co-Option	Sheamus Greene (Sinn Féin)	Tom O'Reilly (Sinn Féin)	Eamon Keenan (Independent)	Garbhan McPhillips (SDLP)/ (Independent)	Victor Warrington (UUP)	Paul Robinson (DUP)
2019	Sheamus Greene (Sinn Féin)	Tom O'Reilly (Sinn Féin)	John McCluskey (Independent)	Garbhan McPhillips (SDLP)/ (Independent)	Victor Warrington (UUP)	Paul Robinson (DUP)
May 2016 Co-Option	Sheamus Greene (Sinn Féin)	Tom O'Reilly (Sinn Féin)	Brian McCaffrey (Sinn Féin)	Garbhan McPhillips (SDLP)/ (Independent)	Victor Warrington (UUP)	Paul Robinson (DUP)
2014	Sheamus Greene (Sinn Féin)	Tom O'Reilly (Sinn Féin)	Brian McCaffrey (Sinn Féin)	Richie McPhillips (SDLP)	Victor Warrington (UUP)	Paul Robinson (DUP)
2011	Sheamus Greene (Sinn Féin)	Tom O'Reilly (Sinn Féin)	Brian McCaffrey (Sinn Féin)	Ruth Lynch (Sinn Féin)	Harold Andrews (UUP)	Paul Robinson (DUP)
2005	Fergus McQuillan (SDLP)	Tom O'Reilly (Sinn Féin)	Brian McCaffrey (Sinn Féin)	Ruth Lynch (Sinn Féin)	Harold Andrews (UUP)	Paul Robinson (DUP)
2001	Fergus McQuillan (SDLP)	Tom O'Reilly (Sinn Féin)	Brian McCaffrey (Sinn Féin)	Ruth Lynch (Sinn Féin)	Harold Andrews (UUP)	Cecil Noble (UUP)
1997	Fergus McQuillan (SDLP)	Tony McPhillips (Independent Nationalist)	Brian McCaffrey (Sinn Féin)	Ruth Lynch (Sinn Féin)	Harold Andrews (UUP)	Cecil Noble (UUP)
1993	Fergus McQuillan (SDLP)	Tony McPhillips (Independent Nationalist)	Gerry McHugh (Sinn Féin)	Jean McVitty (UUP)	Albert Liddle (UUP)	Cecil Noble (UUP)
1989	Fergus McQuillan (SDLP)	Brian McCaffrey (Sinn Féin)	Plunkett O'Neill (Sinn Féin)	Jean McVitty (UUP)	Albert Liddle (UUP)	Cecil Noble (UUP)
1985	Fergus McQuillan (SDLP)	Vincent McCaffrey (Sinn Féin)	Plunkett O'Neill (Sinn Féin)	Thomas Murray (Sinn Féin)	Albert Liddle (UUP)	Cecil Noble (UUP)

== 2023 Election ==
2019: 2 x Sinn Féin, 1 x DUP, 1 x UUP, 1 x SDLP, 1 x Independent

2023: 3 x Sinn Féin, 1 x DUP, 1 x UUP, 1 x SDLP

2019–2023 Change: Sinn Féin gain from Independent

Erne East - 6 seats
Party	Candidate	FPv%	Count						
Party	Candidate	FPv%	1	2	3	4	5	6	7
Sinn Féin	Sheamus Greene*	20.68%	1,753						
DUP	Paul Robinson*	16.63%	1,410						
Sinn Féin	Thomas O'Reilly*	16.36%	1,387						
Sinn Féin	Noeleen Hayes	15.29%	1,296						
UUP	Victor Warrington*	13.15%	1,115	1,118.08	1,309.46				
SDLP	Garbhan McPhillips* ‡	5.87%	498	747.48	748.46	824.36	855.02	893.94	1,145.86
Independent	Eamon Keenan*	6.61%	560	719.39	719.81	760.61	764.81	794.35	1,068.17
Alliance	Richard Bullick	2.61%	221	277.98	278.98	298.78	352.68	363.18	
Independent	Tina McDermott	2.81%	238	307.30	307.44	345.24	348.88	351.82	
Electorate: 12,127 Valid: 8,478 (69.91%) Spoilt: 110 Quota: 1,212 Turnout: 8,588 (70.82%)

== 2019 Election ==
2014: 3 x Sinn Féin, 1 x DUP, 1 x UUP, 1 x SDLP

2019: 2 x Sinn Féin, 1 x DUP, 1 x UUP, 1 x SDLP, 1 x Independent

2014-2019 Change: Independent gain from Sinn Féin

Erne East - 6 seats
Party	Candidate	FPv%	Count					
Party	Candidate	FPv%	1	2	3	4	5	6
DUP	Paul Robinson*	16.34%	1,382					
UUP	Victor Warrington*	15.99%	1,352					
Independent	John McCluskey †	15.21%	1,286					
Sinn Féin	Tom O'Reilly*	9.80%	829	830.06	830.64	854.64	876.96	1,248.96
Sinn Féin	Sheamus Greene*	12.20%	1,032	1,032	1,032.56	1,057.56	1,064.34	1,211.34
SDLP	Garbhan McPhillips*	9.92%	839	879.68	928.54	983.68	1,175.68	1,205.86
Sinn Féin	Noeleen Hayes	8.73%	738	738.18	738.18	754.18	766.32	834.5
Sinn Féin	Brian McCaffrey*	7.33%	620	620.54	620.54	632.54	639.72	
Independent	Caroline Wheeler	2.41%	204	326.76	415.66	439.2		
Aontú	Gerry McHugh	2.06%	174	175.8	176.36			
Electorate: 11,963 Valid: 8,456 (70.68%) Spoilt: 112 Quota: 1,209 Turnout: 8,568 (71.62%)

== 2014 Election ==
2011: 4 x Sinn Féin, 1 x UUP, 1 x DUP

2014: 3 x Sinn Féin, 1 x UUP, 1 x DUP, 1 x SDLP

2011-2014 Change: SDLP gain from Sinn Féin

Erne East - 6 seats
Party	Candidate	FPv%	Count			
Party	Candidate	FPv%	1	2	3	4
UUP	Victor Warrington	16.20%	1,272			
DUP	Paul Robinson*	15.87%	1,246			
SDLP	Richie McPhillips †	12.93%	1,015	1,123		
Sinn Féin	Tom O'Reilly*	13.69%	1,075	1,081	1,097	1,115
Sinn Féin	Brian McCaffrey*	13.26%	1,041	1,041	1,046	1,049
Sinn Féin	Sheamus Greene*	12.80%	1,005	1,008	1,026	1,049
Sinn Féin	Kate Mulligan	11.49%	902	905	916	931
UKIP	Fred Parkinson	3.77%	296			
Electorate: 11,443 Valid: 7,852 (68.62%) Spoilt: 129 Quota: 1,122 Turnout: 7,981 (69.75%)

== 2011 Election ==
2005: 3 x Sinn Féin, 1 x UUP, 1 x DUP, 1 x SDLP

2011: 4 x Sinn Féin, 1 x UUP, 1 x DUP

2005-2011 Change: Sinn Féin gain from SDLP

Erne East - 6 seats
Party	Candidate	FPv%	Count				
Party	Candidate	FPv%	1	2	3	4	5
Sinn Féin	Ruth Lynch*	17.88%	1,564				
DUP	Paul Robinson*	15.66%	1,370				
Sinn Féin	Brian McCaffrey*	12.30%	1,076	1,238.2	1,331.2		
Sinn Féin	Tom O'Reilly*	12.75%	1,115	1,167.8	1,275.8		
Sinn Féin	Sheamus Greene	12.28%	1,074	1,127.6	1,184.8	1,184.8	1,230.8
UUP	Harold Andrews*	12.89%	1,127	1,127.2	1,130.2	1,198.24	1,198.24
SDLP	Rosemary Flanagan	6.06%	530	550.8	603.4	604.3	613.3
UUP	Victor Warrington	5.87%	513	513.2	517.2	558.51	559.51
Independent	Gerry McHugh*	4.31%	377	391.2			
Electorate: 11,720 Valid: 8,746 (74.62%) Spoilt: 181 Quota: 1,250 Turnout: 8,927 (76.17%)

== 2005 Election ==
2001: 3 x Sinn Féin, 2 x UUP, 1 x SDLP

2005: 3 x Sinn Féin, 1 x UUP, 1 x DUP, 1 x SDLP

2001-2005 Change: DUP gain from UUP

Erne East - 6 seats
Party	Candidate	FPv%	Count			
Party	Candidate	FPv%	1	2	3	4
DUP	Paul Robinson	14.52%	1,277			
UUP	Harold Andrews*	11.62%	1,022	1,705		
SDLP	Fergus McQuillan*	13.16%	1,157	1,169	1,555	
Sinn Féin	Ruth Lynch*	13.61%	1,197	1,198	1,198	1,203
Sinn Féin	Tom O'Reilly*	13.41%	1,179	1,179	1,179	1,191
Sinn Féin	Brian McCaffrey*	12.87%	1,132	1,133	1,137	1,141
Sinn Féin	Seán Lynch	12.62%	1,110	1,110	1,110	1,111
UUP	Jean McVitty	8.18%	719			
Electorate: 11,003 Valid: 8,793 (79.91%) Spoilt: 140 Quota: 1,257 Turnout: 8,933 (81.19%)

== 2001 Election ==
1997: 2 x Sinn Féin, 2 x UUP, 1 x SDLP, 1 x Independent Nationalist

2001: 3 x Sinn Féin, 2 x UUP, 1 x SDLP

1997-2001 Change: Sinn Féin gain from Independent Nationalist

Erne East - 6 seats
Party	Candidate	FPv%	Count				
Party	Candidate	FPv%	1	2	3	4	5
Sinn Féin	Ruth Lynch*	16.46%	1,428				
UUP	Harold Andrews*	15.53%	1,348				
SDLP	Fergus McQuillan*	14.90%	1,293				
Sinn Féin	Brian McCaffrey*	13.72%	1,191	1,334.39			
Sinn Féin	Tom O'Reilly	12.10%	1,050	1,075.61	1,075.61	1,402.61	
UUP	Cecil Noble*	11.50%	998	998.13	1,091.89	1,105.67	1,141.67
DUP	Paul Robinson	9.35%	811	811.13	822.01	827.51	837.51
Independent	Michael McPhillips	6.44%	559	570.05	570.45		
Electorate: 10,700 Valid: 8,678 (81.10%) Spoilt: 165 Quota: 1,240 Turnout: 8,843 (82.64%)

== 1997 Election ==
1993: 3 x UUP, 1 x Sinn Féin, 1 x SDLP, 1 x Independent Nationalist

1997: 2 x UUP, 2 x Sinn Féin, 1 x SDLP, 1 x Independent Nationalist

1993-1997 Change: Sinn Féin gain from UUP

Erne East - 6 seats
Party	Candidate	FPv%	Count						
Party	Candidate	FPv%	1	2	3	4	5	6	7
UUP	Harold Andrews	14.04%	1,149	1,150	1,281				
Sinn Féin	Brian McCaffrey	11.22%	918	944	946	1,385			
Sinn Féin	Ruth Lynch	13.11%	1,073	1,078	1,078	1,246			
SDLP	Fergus McQuillan*	10.96%	897	1,149	1,150	1,193			
Ind. Nationalist	Tony McPhillips*	11.11%	909	961	963	1,000	1,137	1,137	1,194
UUP	Cecil Noble*	11.39%	932	932	1,071	1,071	1,071	1,104.3	1,104.3
UUP	Jean McVitty*	10.83%	886	888	962	963	964	1,042.3	1,043.3
Sinn Féin	Hugh O'Reilly	8.48%	694	699	699				
DUP	Paul Robinson	4.51%	369	371					
SDLP	Marie O'Neill	4.34%	355						
Electorate: 10,446 Valid: 8,182 (78.33%) Spoilt: 141 Quota: 1,169 Turnout: 8,323 (79.68%)

== 1993 Election ==
1989: 3 x UUP, 2 x Sinn Féin, 1 x SDLP

1993: 3 x UUP, 1 x Sinn Féin, 1 x SDLP, 1 x Independent Nationalist

1989-1993 Change: Independent Nationalist gain from Sinn Féin

Erne East - 6 seats
Party	Candidate	FPv%	Count							
Party	Candidate	FPv%	1	2	3	4	5	6	7	8
SDLP	Fergus McQuillan*	17.01%	1,398							
UUP	Jean McVitty*	13.71%	1,127	1,132.94						
Ind. Nationalist	Tony McPhillips	8.78%	722	806.78	829.4	829.4	1,235.9			
Sinn Féin	Gerry McHugh	9.54%	784	794.08	1,085.6	1,085.78	1,188.78			
UUP	Cecil Noble*	11.87%	976	976.36	976.36	1,171.36	1,173.44	1,225.12		
UUP	Albert Liddle*	11.01%	905	906.44	906.44	1,038.44	1,043.16	1,081.24	1,083.22	1,128.78
Sinn Féin	Brian McCaffrey*	10.15%	834	844.44	922.34	923.34	1,009.5	1,009.5	1,039.38	1,039.38
Ind. Republican	John McCusker	6.85%	563	659.48	701.54	702.72				
DUP	Paul Robinson	5.84%	480	480.36	480.36					
Sinn Féin	Philip McDonald	5.24%	431	439.46						
Electorate: 10,129 Valid: 8,220 (81.15%) Spoilt: 158 Quota: 1,175 Turnout: 8,378 (82.71%)

== 1989 Election ==
1985: 3 x Sinn Féin, 2 x UUP, 1 x SDLP

1989: 3 x UUP, 2 x Sinn Féin, 1 x SDLP

1985-1989 Change: UUP gain from Sinn Féin

Erne East - 6 seats
Party	Candidate	FPv%	Count								
Party	Candidate	FPv%	1	2	3	4	5	6	7	8	9
SDLP	Fergus McQuillan*	19.28%	1,547								
UUP	Cecil Noble*	15.81%	1,268								
UUP	Albert Liddle*	13.20%	1,059	1,061.38	1,135.36	1,159.36					
Sinn Féin	Brian McCaffrey	9.29%	745	776.28	776.28	776.28	783	783	920.5	1,423.5	
Sinn Féin	Plunket O'Neill*	7.62%	611	625.62	625.62	625.62	646.7	647.79	846.99	987.59	1,249.79
UUP	Jean McVitty	8.31%	667	672.78	702.03	716.81	723.67	1,034.24	1,038.33	1,040.33	1,040.33
Ind. Republican	John McCusker	5.90%	473	669.52	669.52	669.52	786.28	786.28	859.2	901.62	914.82
Sinn Féin	Vincent McCaffrey*	8.21%	659	685.52	685.52	685.52	695.54	695.54	739.32		
Sinn Féin	Ciaran Leonard	5.37%	431	473.16	473.34	474.34	484.72	485.72			
DUP	Paul Robinson	3.29%	264	264	271.11	357.74	358.74				
Ind. Socialist	Seamus Mullan	2.12%	170	244.12	244.3	245.64					
DUP	Caroline Madill	1.60%	128	128.68	130.93						
Electorate: 9,489 Valid: 8,022 (84.54%) Spoilt: 155 Quota: 1,147 Turnout: 8,177 (86.17%)

== 1985 Election ==
1985: 3 x Sinn Féin, 2 x UUP, 1 x SDLP

Erne East - 6 seats
Party	Candidate	FPv%	Count											
Party	Candidate	FPv%	1	2	3	4	5	6	7	8	9	10	11	12
UUP	Cecil Noble*	15.51%	1,279											
SDLP	Fergus McQuillan*	8.11%	669	669.14	682.14	683.14	733.14	885.14	1,374.14					
UUP	Albert Liddle	8.24%	680	732.57	733.64	744.06	744.06	746.06	747.06	748.06	1,374.06			
Sinn Féin	Plunket O'Neill	12.11%	999	999	1,014	1,014	1,060	1,070	1,079	1,103	1,106	1,106.37	1,554.37	
Sinn Féin	Thomas Murray	9.02%	744	744	745	745	760	760	817	887	888	888.37	1,013.74	1,168.54
Sinn Féin	Vincent McCaffrey	8.23%	679	679	683	683	721	725	765	810	813	813.74	832.88	1,151.58
DUP	William Mitchell	7.04%	581	588.21	588.21	756.42	756.42	756.42	756.42	758.42	808.57	1,000.6	1,001.97	1,001.97
Sinn Féin	John McCusker*	8.05%	664	664.14	671.14	671.14	697.14	703.14	717.14	755.14	756.14	757.25		
UUP	Thomas Johnston	7.82%	645	672.51	673.58	689.07	689.07	691.07	696.07	705.07				
SDLP	James Goodwin	5.97%	492	492	503	504	519	651						
SDLP	John Reihill	3.20%	264	264.07	294.07	294.07	329.07							
Irish Independence	John McMahon*	2.92%	241	241	264	264								
DUP	Caroline Madill	2.40%	198	199.12	199.12									
Ind. Socialist	Seamus Mullan	1.37%	113	113.14										
Electorate: 9,572 Valid: 8,248 (86.17%) Spoilt: 130 Quota: 1,179 Turnout: 8,378 (87.53%)
