= Gerry McHugh =

Irish Republican politician

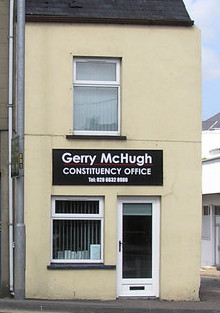
- McHugh's constituency office in Enniskillen in 2009

Member of the Northern Ireland Assembly for Fermanagh & South Tyrone
- In office 7 March 2007 – 5 May 2011
- Preceded by: Tom O'Reilly
- Succeeded by: Sean Lynch
- In office 25 June 1998 – 26 November 2003
- Preceded by: New Creation
- Succeeded by: Tom O'Reilly

Member of Fermanagh District Council
- In office 21 May 1997 – 5 May 2011
- Preceded by: John McManus
- Succeeded by: Sean Lynch
- Constituency: Enniskillen
- In office 19 May 1993 – 21 May 1997
- Preceded by: Plunkett O'Neill
- Succeeded by: Brian McCaffery
- Constituency: Erne East

Northern Ireland Forum member for Fermanagh and South Tyrone
- In office 30 May 1996 – 25 April 1998
- Preceded by: New forum
- Succeeded by: Forum dissolved

Personal details
- Born: County Tyrone, Northern Ireland
- Party: Aontú (2019-present); Fianna Fáil (2009-2019); Independent (2007-2009); Sinn Féin (1993-2007)

Gerry McHugh (born 9 October 1957) is an Irish Republican politician, active in Northern Ireland, who was a Member of the Legislative Assembly (MLA) for Fermanagh and South Tyrone from 1998 to 2003, and then again from 2007 to 2011.

Additionally, McHugh was a Fermanagh District Councillor for the Enniskillen DEA from 1997 to 2011, having previously represented the Erne East DEA from 1993 to 1997.

Formerly a member of Sinn Féin, he resigned from the party in 2007, remaining an independent for the remainder of his time as an MLA and councillor.

== Background ==
McHugh is a past pupil of St Comhghall's Secondary School in Lisnaskea.

He was elected, as a Sinn Féin member, onto Fermanagh District Council at the 1993 local elections, representing the Erne East District.

He was elected to the Enniskillen District at the 1997 local elections.

He was elected to the Northern Ireland Forum in 1996, then to the Northern Ireland Assembly at the 1998 election as a Sinn Féin member for Fermanagh and South Tyrone. He lost his seat in 2003, but regained it in 2007. His fellow Sinn Féin member on both occasions was Michelle Gildernew.

He became an independent on 29 November 2007, citing his perceived problems with lack of democracy in his former party.

On 30 November 2009, he announced that he was a member of Fianna Fáil. However, he was not allowed represent the party in Stormont nor sit on a Council for them and did not contest the 2011 Assembly election accordingly. Instead McHugh stood as an independent in Erne East at the 2011 local elections, but was not elected.

On 2 February 2019 The Impartial Reporter reported that McHugh had joined Aontú, a new pro-life nationalist party founded by Peadar Tóibín. In the May 2019 local election, he was the party's candidate stood in the six-seat Erne East District Electoral Area for Fermanagh and Omagh District Council, finishing last of ten candidates.

Northern Ireland Forum
New forum	Member for Fermanagh and South Tyrone; 1996–1998	Forum dissolved
Northern Ireland Assembly
New assembly	MLA for Fermanagh & South Tyrone; 1998–2003	Succeeded by Tom O'Reilly
Preceded by Tom O'Reilly	MLA for Fermanagh & South Tyrone; 2007–2011	Succeeded by Sean Lynch
