= Seán Lynch (politician) =

Irish politician (born 1954)

Seán Lynch MLA
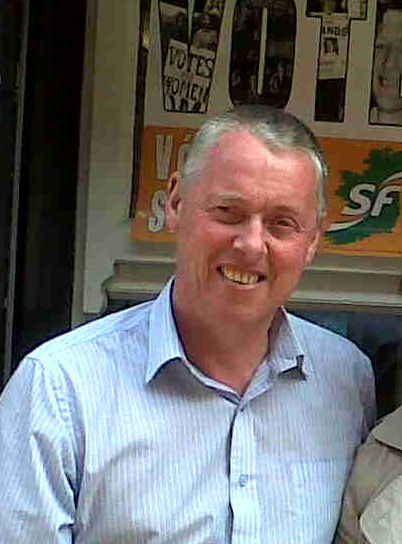

Member of the Northern Ireland Assembly for Fermanagh & South Tyrone
- In office 7 May 2011 – July 2021
- Preceded by: Gerry McHugh
- Succeeded by: Aine Murphy

Councillor on Fermanagh District Council
- In office 10 May 2011 – 11 September 2011
- Preceded by: Pat Cox
- Succeeded by: Tommy Maguire
- Constituency: Enniskillen Electoral Area

Personal details
- Born: 11 January 1954 (age 72) Enniskillen, County Fermanagh, Northern Ireland
- Party: Sinn Féin
- Profession: Politician
- Known for: Officer Commanding Provisional IRA prisoners in Long Kesh
- Website: Official webpage

Seán Lynch MLA (Irish: Seán Ó Loingsigh; born 11 January 1954) is an Irish republican Sinn Féin politician and a former MLA for the constituency of Fermanagh and South Tyrone. He was a former Provisional Irish Republican Army (IRA) leader in the Maze Prison (known as Long Kesh by Irish republicans).

Lynch previously served as Chairman of Sinn Féin in Fermanagh and as a senior member of the district policing partnership in the county. Lynch previously stood for the Fermanagh and South Tyrone constituency in the 2007 Northern Ireland Assembly election but was unsuccessful. Lynch was a councillor on Fermanagh District Council prior to his election to the Northern Ireland Assembly.

== Background ==
Born in 1954 into a Roman Catholic farming family in rural County Fermanagh, he is the eldest of 12 children and was raised near Lisnaskea, where he currently lives. One of his sisters, Ruth Lynch, is a Fermanagh District Council Sinn Féin councillor. Another, Mary Lynch, wrote The Long Road Home.

== Provisional IRA membership ==
In April 1986 Lynch was seriously wounded and fellow IRA member Séamus McElwaine was shot dead when the SAS opened fire on them as they prepared to ambush a passing army patrol with a land mine on the Lisnaskea to Roslea road. Lynch was shot by the SAS and seriously wounded, after which he was arrested. After four months in Musgrave Park Hospital Military Wing, he was transferred to Crumlin Road Jail.

In December 1986, he was sentenced to 25 years for possession of explosives and a rifle and transferred to the Maze Prison. He was released in October 1998 under the terms of the Good Friday Agreement, after serving 12 years of his 25-year sentence.

=== Séamus McElwaine Inquest ===
In January 1993 an inquest jury returned a verdict that McElwaine had been unlawfully killed. The jury ruled the SAS soldiers had opened fire without giving McElwaine a chance to surrender, and that he was actually shot dead five minutes after being wounded. The Director of Public Prosecutions requested a full report on the inquest from the RUC. There were no prosecutions based on the findings.

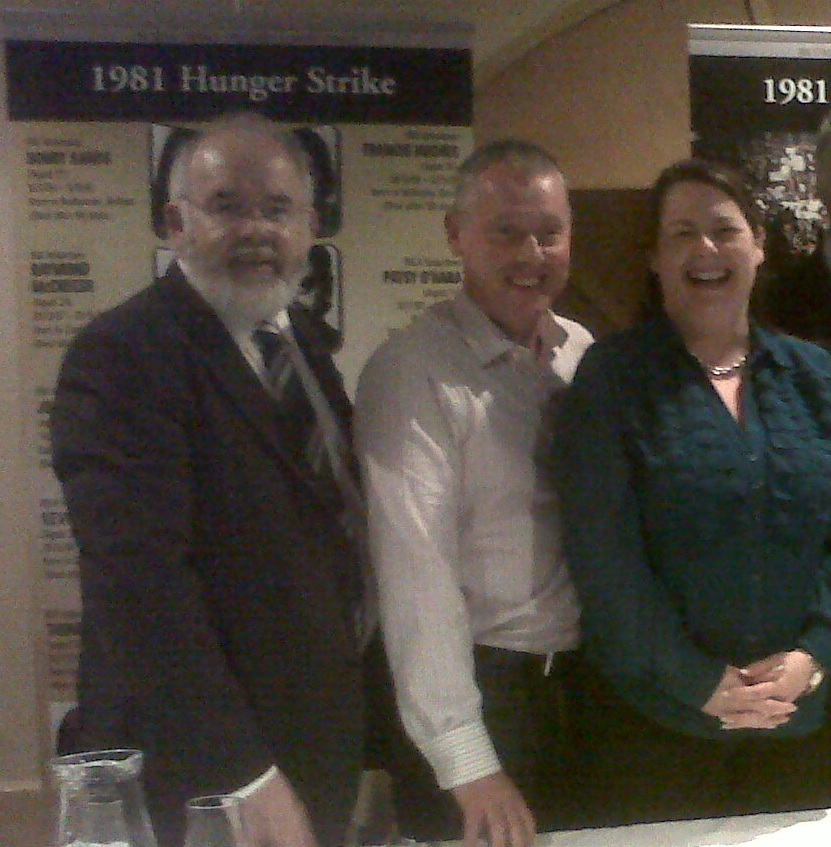
Lynch speaking with Francie Molloy MLA and Michelle Gildernew MP MLA in Lisnaskea, County Fermanagh, May 2011

=== Political career following prison release ===
Since his release from prison Lynch has worked as a senior member for Sinn Féin and was on the officer board of what was then the Sinn Féin Six-County Cúige and subsequently as a Six-County representative on the party’s ruling Ard Chomhairle. He was director of elections for Michelle Gildernew when she won the Westminster seat of Fermanagh and South Tyrone for the party in 2005. Lynch also sat on Fermanagh District Policing Partnership.

== Northern Ireland Assembly Election 2007, 2011, 2016 and 2017 ==
Lynch stood as a candidate in the 2007 Assembly Election. Lynch polled 4,704 votes, failing to win a seat. He was selected by Sinn Féin in Fermanagh and South Tyrone to stand again as a candidate in the 2011 Assembly Election on 5 May 2011. Lynch was elected on 7 May 2011. He was elected to Fermanagh District Council on 10 May 2011.

In line with Sinn Féin's policy of not holding dual mandates Lynch resigned from his council seat to allow a party member to take his place on the council. In September 2011, Tommy Maguire was co-opted onto Fermanagh District Council

Lynch retained his seat in the 2016 Assembly Election with 4,782 first preference votes. He again retained his seat in the 2017 Assembly Election with an increased first preference vote of 6,254. In March 2021 it was announced that Sean Lynch would be stepping down from his role as an MLA with Aine Murphy replacing him in July 2021.

== See also ==
- Séamus McElwaine
- Long Kesh
- Sinn Féin
- 2007 Northern Ireland Assembly election
- 2011 Northern Ireland Assembly election

Northern Ireland Assembly
Preceded by Gerry McHugh	MLA for Fermanagh and South Tyrone; 2011–present	Incumbent
