= Cross-Community Labour Alternative =

- Leader: Owen McCracken
- Founded: 2016
- Headquarters: 25 Ava Avenue; Belfast; BT7 3BP
- Ideology: Eco-socialism
- National affiliation: Socialist Party (2016 to 2019); Militant Left (from 2019)
- Colours
- NI Assembly: 0 / 90
- NI Local Councils: 0 / 462

Cross-Community Labour Alternative is a minor political party founded to contest the 2016 Northern Ireland Assembly election. It stood three candidates in the East Belfast, South Belfast and East Antrim constituencies. It was initiated by the Socialist Party.

== Election results ==
In the 2016 Assembly election, Cross-Community Labour Alternative reached 1939 first-preference votes, having stood 3 candidates. Conor Sheridan polled 551 first preference votes (1.7%) in East Antrim, Sean Burns got 871 first preferences (2.7%) in Belfast South and Courtney Robinson got 517 first preferences (1.4%) in Belfast East.

In the 2017 election, the CCLA stood four candidates, in the same three constituencies as before, and also in Fermanagh and South Tyrone. They won no seats and a slightly increased first-preference vote, with 2,009 votes (0.3%).

In the 2019 Northern Ireland local elections, one of the party's candidates, Donal O'Cofaigh, was elected to Fermanagh and Omagh District Council. CCLA lost their only seat in the 2023 Council elections when Donal O'Cofaigh failed to retain his council seat. In the 2022 Assembly election CCLA ran O'Cofaigh as the party's only candidate.

In the 2024 United Kingdom general election, Gerry Cullen stood for the CCLA in the Fermanagh and South Tyrone (UK Parliament constituency). He attracted 624 votes (1.2%).

=== Northern Ireland Assembly ===
Election	Votes	Share of votes	Seats	Note(s)
2016	1,939	0.3%	0 / 108	#13
2017	2,009	0.3%	0 / 90	#11
2022	602	0.07%	0 / 90	#13
