= Tom O'Reilly (Fermanagh politician) =

Member of Fermanagh and Omagh District Council
- Incumbent
- Assumed office 22 May 2014
- Preceded by: Council established
- Constituency: Erne East

Member of Fermanagh District Council
- In office 7 June 2001 – 22 May 2014
- Preceded by: Tony McPhillips
- Succeeded by: Council abolished
- Constituency: Erne East

Member of the Northern Ireland Assembly for Fermanagh & South Tyrone
- In office 26 November 2003 – 7 March 2007
- Preceded by: Gerry McHugh
- Succeeded by: Gerry McHugh

Personal details
- Born: County Fermanagh, Northern Ireland
- Party: Sinn Féin

Tom O'Reilly is an Irish Sinn Féin politician, serving as a Fermanagh and Omagh District councillor for the Erne East DEA since 2014.

O'Reilly was previously a Member of the Legislative Assembly (MLA) for Fermanagh and South Tyrone from 2003 to 2007.

== Political career ==
O'Reilly first stood as a Sinn Féin candidate for Fermanagh District Council in 1997 and was first elected in 2001. He was re-elected in 2005 and 2011. At the 2003 Northern Ireland Assembly election, he was elected in Fermanagh and South Tyrone, although he chose to stand down at the 2007 election. In 2014 O'Reilly was elected onto the new Fermanagh and Omagh District Council. O'Reilly was chosen by the members of Fermanagh and Omagh District Council to be the first Chairperson of the new Council.

Northern Ireland Assembly
Preceded by Gerry McHugh	MLA for Fermanagh & South Tyrone; 2003–2007	Succeeded by Gerry McHugh
