= Fermanagh and Omagh District Council =

Local authority in Northern Ireland

Fermanagh and Omagh District Council Comhairle Ceantair Fhear Manach agus na hÓmaí Districk Cooncil o Fermanagh an Omey

Type
- Type: District council of Fermanagh and Omagh

History
- Founded: 1 April 2015
- Preceded by: Fermanagh District Council; Omagh District Council

Leadership
- Chair: Debbie Coyle, Sinn Féin
- Deputy Chair: Stephen McCann, Sinn Féin

Structure
- Seats: 40
- Graph of the party split among 40 seats.
- Political groups: All parties (40) Sinn Féin (21) UUP (7) DUP (6) SDLP (2) Alliance (2) Independent (2)
- Length of term: 4 years

Elections
- Voting system: Single transferable vote
- Last election: 18 May 2023
- Next election: 6 May 2027

Meeting place
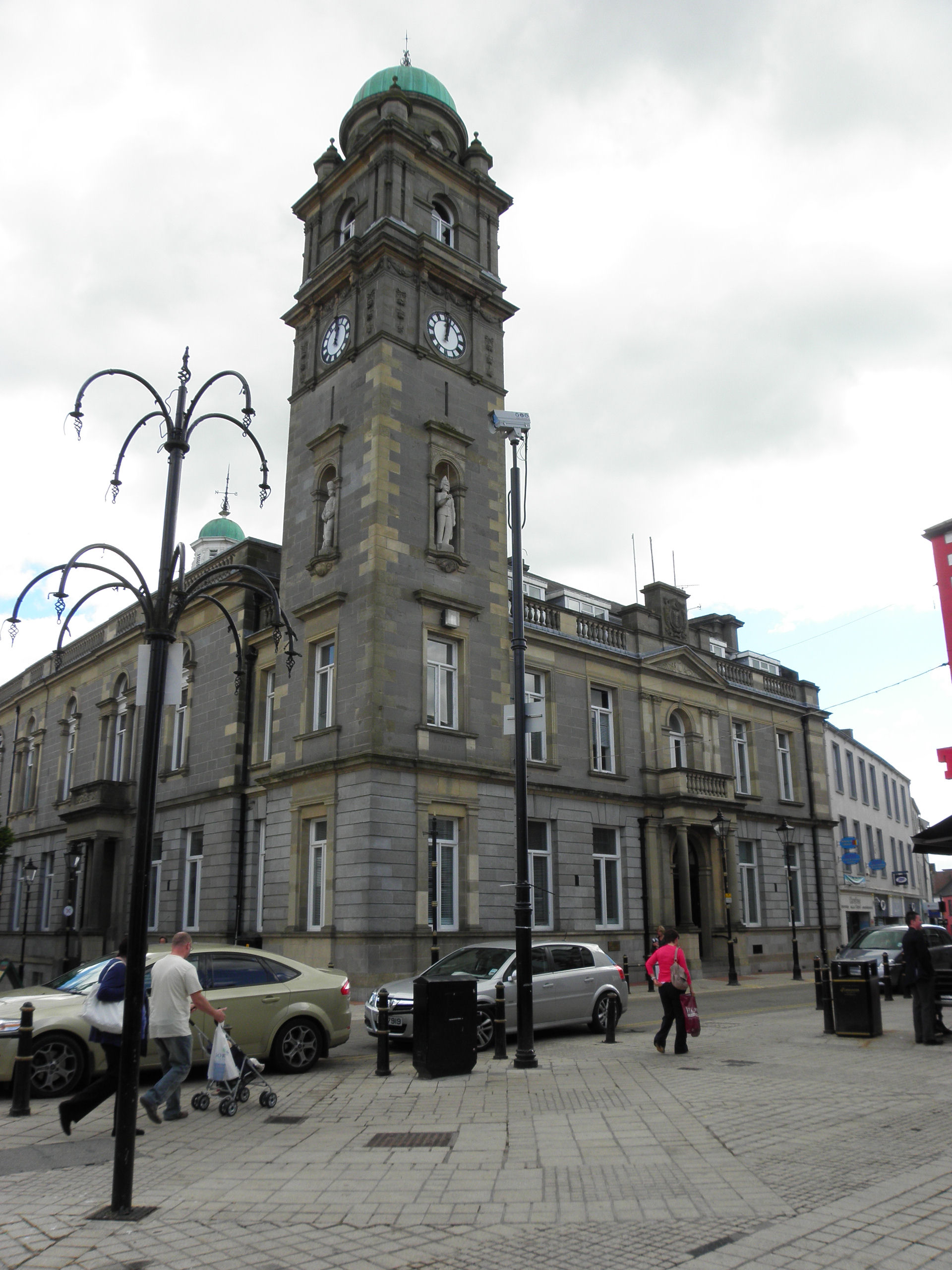
- Townhall, 2 Townhall Street, Enniskillen (pictured) and The Grange, Mountjoy Road, Omagh

Website
- www.fermanaghomagh.com

Fermanagh and Omagh District Council (Irish: Comhairle Ceantair Fhear Manach agus na hÓmaí; Ulster-Scots: Districk Cooncil o Fermanagh an Omey) is a local authority in Northern Ireland and was established on 1 April 2015. It replaced Fermanagh District Council and Omagh District Council and covers most of the southwest of Northern Ireland. Its first election was on 22 May 2014, and it acted as a shadow authority prior to the creation of the Fermanagh and Omagh district in April 2015.

== Chairmanship ==
=== Chair ===
From	To	Name	Party
2015	2016	Thomas O'Reilly	Sinn Féin
2016	2017	Mary Garrity	SDLP
2017	2018	Stephen McCann	Sinn Féin
2018	2019	Howard Thornton	UUP
2019	2020	Siobhan Currie	Sinn Féin
2020	2020	Chris Smyth	UUP
2020	2021	Diana Armstrong	UUP
2021	2022	Errol Thompson	DUP
2022	2023	Barry McElduff	Sinn Féin
2023	2024	Thomas O’Reilly	Sinn Féin
2024	2025	John McClaughry	UUP
2025	2026	Barry McElduff	Sinn Féin
2026	2027	Debbie Coyle	Sinn Féin

=== Vice Chair ===
From	To	Name	Party
2015	2016	Paul Robinson	DUP
2016	2017	Bert Wilson	UUP
2017	2018	Alex Baird	UUP
2018	2019	John Feely	Sinn Féin
2019	2020	Diana Armstrong	UUP
2020	2021	John Coyle	SDLP
2021	2022	Chris McCaffrey	Sinn Féin
2022	2023	Allan Rainey	UUP
2023	2024	Ann-Marie Donnelly	Sinn Féin
2024	2025	Elaine Brough	Sinn Féin
2025	2026	Shirley Hawkes	DUP
2026	2027	Stephen McCann	Sinn Féin

== Councillors ==
For the purpose of elections the council is divided into seven district electoral areas (DEA):

Area	Seats
Enniskillen	6
Erne East	6
Erne North	5
Erne West	5
Mid Tyrone	6
Omagh	6
West Tyrone	6

=== Seat summary ===
Party	Elected 2014	Elected 2019	Elected 2023	Current
Sinn Féin	17	15	21	21
Ulster Unionist Party	9	9	7	9
Social Democratic and Labour Party	8	5	3	2
Democratic Unionist Party	5	5	6	6
Alliance Party of Northern Ireland	0	1	2	2
Cross-Community Labour Alternative	0	1	0	0
Independents	1	4	1	2

=== Councillors by electoral area ===
Borders of the DEAs within Fermanagh and Omagh

Current council members
District electoral area	Name	Party
Enniskillen	Aaron Elliott †	DUP
Enniskillen	Eddie Roofe	Alliance
Enniskillen	Tommy Maguire	Sinn Féin
Enniskillen	Roy Crawford	UUP
Enniskillen	Dermot Browne	Sinn Féin
Enniskillen	Robert Irvine	UUP
Erne East	Sheamus Greene	Sinn Féin
Erne East	Paul Robinson	DUP
Erne East	Tom O'Reilly	Sinn Féin
Erne East	Noeleen Hayes	Sinn Féin
Erne East	Victor Warrington	UUP
Erne East	Garbhan McPhillips ‡	Independent
Erne North	Debbie Coyle	Sinn Féin
Erne North	Rosemary Barton †	UUP
Erne North	David Mahon	DUP
Erne North	John Feely	Sinn Féin
Erne North	John McClaughtry	UUP
Erne West	Anthony Feely	Sinn Féin
Erne West	Elaine Brough	Sinn Féin
Erne West	Declan McArdle	Sinn Féin
Erne West	Adam Gannon	SDLP
Erne West	Mark Ovens	UUP
Mid Tyrone	Pádraigín Kelly	Sinn Féin
Mid Tyrone	Roisin Devine Gallagher	Sinn Féin
Mid Tyrone	Ruaídhrí Lyttle †	Sinn Féin
Mid Tyrone	Patrick Withers	Sinn Féin
Mid Tyrone	Shirley Hawkes	DUP
Mid Tyrone	Bernard McGrath	SDLP
Omagh	Barry McElduff	Sinn Féin
Omagh	Errol Thompson	DUP
Omagh	Catherine Kelly	Sinn Féin
Omagh	Marty McColgan	Sinn Féin
Omagh	Stephen Donnelly	Alliance
Omagh	Josephine Deehan	Independent
West Tyrone	Mark Buchanan	DUP
West Tyrone	Glenn Campbell	Sinn Féin
West Tyrone	Allan Rainey	UUP
West Tyrone	Ann-Marie Donnelly	Sinn Féin
West Tyrone	Collette McNulty	Sinn Féin
West Tyrone	Stephen McCann	Sinn Féin

== Premises ==
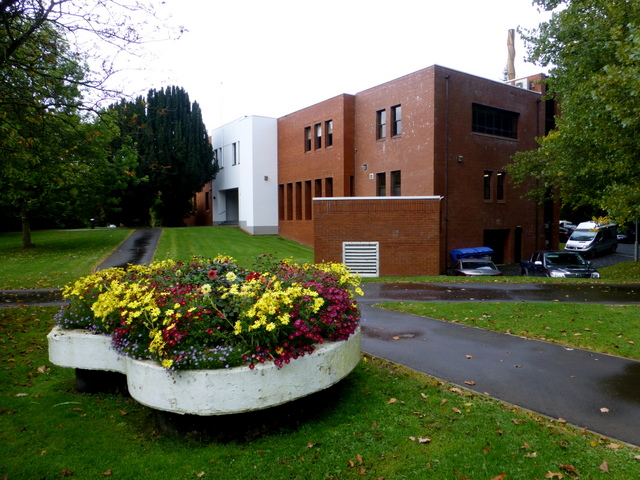
The Grange, Omagh

The council has two main administrative buildings, being the Townhall in Enniskillen, which was formerly the headquarters of Fermanagh District Council, and The Grange in Omagh, which was formerly the headquarters of Omagh District Council. Council meetings are held at both buildings.

== Population ==
The area covered by the new council has a population of 113,161 residents according to the 2011 Northern Ireland census.

== See also ==
- Local government in Northern Ireland
- 2014 Northern Ireland local elections
- Political make-up of local councils in the United Kingdom
