= Erne North (District Electoral Area) =

District electoral area in Northern Ireland

- Fermanagh and Omagh District Council DEA constituency

Current constituency
- Created: 1985
- Seats: 5 (1985-)
- Councillors: Rosemary Barton (UUP); Debbie Coyle (SF); John Feely (SF); David Mahon (DUP); John McClaughry (UUP)

Erne North DEA within Fermanagh and Omagh

Erne North DEA (1993–2014) within Fermanagh

Erne North is one of the seven district electoral areas (DEA) in Fermanagh and Omagh, Northern Ireland. The district elects five members to Fermanagh and Omagh District Council and contains the wards of Ballinamallard, Belleek and Boa, Ederney and Kesh, Irvinestown and Tempo. Erne North forms part of the Fermanagh and South Tyrone constituencies for the Northern Ireland Assembly and UK Parliament.

It was created for the 1985 local elections, replacing Fermanagh Area D which had existed since 1973, where it originally contained five wards (Ballinamallard, Belleek and Boa, Ederny and Lack, Irvinestown and Kesh and Lisnarrick).

== Councillors ==
Election	Councillor (Party)	Councillor (Party)	Councillor (Party)	Councillor (Party)	Councillor (Party)
October 2024 Co-Option	Debbie Coyle (Sinn Féin)	John Feely (Sinn Féin)	John McClaughry (UUP)	Rosemary Barton (UUP)	David Mahon (DUP)
2023	Debbie Coyle (Sinn Féin)	John Feely (Sinn Féin)	John McClaughry (UUP)	Diana Armstrong (UUP)	David Mahon (DUP)
June 2022 Co-Option	Debbie Coyle (Sinn Féin)	John Coyle (SDLP)	John McClaughry (UUP)	Diana Armstrong (UUP)	Paul Stevenson (DUP)
November 2021 Co-Option	Siobhán Currie (Sinn Féin)	John Coyle (SDLP)	John McClaughry (UUP)	Diana Armstrong (UUP)	Paul Stevenson (DUP)
2019	Siobhán Currie (Sinn Féin)	John Coyle (SDLP)	John McClaughry (UUP)	Diana Armstrong (UUP)	Deborah Erskine (DUP)
June 2016 Co-Option	John Feely (Sinn Féin)	John Coyle (SDLP)	Raymond Farrell (DUP)/ (Independent)/ (UUP)	Diana Armstrong (UUP)	David Mahon (DUP)
May 2016 Defection	John Feely (Sinn Féin)	John Coyle (SDLP)	Raymond Farrell (DUP)/ (Independent)/ (UUP)	Rosemary Barton (UUP)	David Mahon (DUP)
October 2015 Defection	John Feely (Sinn Féin)	John Coyle (SDLP)	Raymond Farrell (DUP)/ (Independent)/ (UUP)	Rosemary Barton (UUP)	David Mahon (DUP)
2014	John Feely (Sinn Féin)	John Coyle (SDLP)	Raymond Farrell (DUP)/ (Independent)/ (UUP)	Rosemary Barton (UUP)	David Mahon (DUP)
2011	Phil Flanagan (Sinn Féin)	John O'Kane (SDLP)	Raymond Farrell (DUP)/ (Independent)/ (UUP)	Rosemary Barton (UUP)	Bert Johnston (DUP)
2005	Breege McSorley (Sinn Féin)	John O'Kane (SDLP)	Bertie Kerr (UUP)	Tom Elliott (UUP)	Bert Johnston (DUP)
2001	Joe Cassidy (Sinn Féin)	John O'Kane (SDLP)	Bertie Kerr (UUP)	Tom Elliott (UUP)	Bert Johnston (DUP)
1997	Geraldine Cassidy (Sinn Féin)	Tommy Gallagher (SDLP)	Bertie Kerr (UUP)	Caldwell McClaughry (UUP)	Bert Johnston (DUP)
1993	John O'Kane (SDLP)	Tommy Gallagher (SDLP)	Bertie Kerr (UUP)	Caldwell McClaughry (UUP)	Bert Johnston (DUP)
1989	John O'Kane (SDLP)	Tommy Gallagher (SDLP)	Simon Loane (UUP)	Caldwell McClaughry (UUP)	Bert Johnston (DUP)
1985	John O'Kane (SDLP)	Stephen Maguire (Sinn Féin)	Simon Loane (UUP)	Caldwell McClaughry (UUP)	Bert Johnston (DUP)

== 2023 Election ==
2019: 2 x UUP, 1 x Sinn Féin, 1 x DUP, 1 x SDLP

2023: 2 x Sinn Féin, 2 x UUP, 1 x DUP

2019–2023 Change: Sinn Féin gain from SDLP

Erne North - 5 seats
Party	Candidate	FPv%	Count					
Party	Candidate	FPv%	1	2	3	4	5	6
Sinn Féin	Debbie Coyle*	21.99%	1,561					
UUP	Diana Armstrong* †	19.61%	1,392					
DUP	David Mahon	13.86%	984	984.24	1,009.44	1,184.20		
Sinn Féin	John Feely	12.00%	852	1,181.76	1,181.76	1,181.76	1,210.76	
UUP	John McClaughry*	7.45%	529	529	673.34	699.58	771.68	1,146.04
SDLP	John Coyle*	11.03%	783	815.16	818.66	818.66	1,023.54	1,034.48
TUV	Alex Elliott	5.94%	422	422.24	433.72	453.14	461.42	
Alliance	Eric Bullick	5.04%	358	366.16	370.36	370.36		
DUP	Paul Stevenson*	3.08%	219	219.24	224.70			
Electorate: 11,509 Valid: 7,100 (61.69%) Spoilt: 93 Quota: 1,184 Turnout: 7,193 (62.46%)

== 2019 Election ==
2014: 2 x UUP, 1 x DUP, 1 x Sinn Féin, 1 x SDLP

2019: 2 x UUP, 1 x DUP, 1 x Sinn Féin, 1 x SDLP

2014-2019 Change: No change

Erne North - 5 seats
Party	Candidate	FPv%	Count						
Party	Candidate	FPv%	1	2	3	4	5	6	7
UUP	Diana Armstrong*	17.32%	1,186						
SDLP	John Coyle*	13.30%	911	914	1,142				
Sinn Féin	Siobhan Currie †	15.40%	1,055	1,056	1,086	1,088	1,088.18	1,779.18	
UUP	John McClaughry	9.20%	630	633	701	883	909.94	921.94	956.94
DUP	Deborah Armstrong †	9.75%	668	670	678	849	853.41	859.41	867.41
DUP	David Mahon*	10.69%	732	736	740	829	832.39	833.39	840.39
Sinn Féin	John Feely*	11.23%	769	769	791	792	792.03		
TUV	Alex Elliot	6.80%	465	468	477				
Alliance	Diane Little	6.03%	413	415					
Democrats and Veterans	Lewis Jennings	0.29%	20						
Electorate: 10,983 Valid: 6,849 (62.36%) Spoilt: 92 Quota: 1,142 Turnout: 6,941 (63.20%)

== 2014 Election ==
2011: 2 x UUP, 1 x DUP, 1 x Sinn Féin, 1 x SDLP

2014: 2 x UUP, 1 x Sinn Féin, 1 x DUP, 1 x SDLP

2011-2014 Change: No change

Erne North - 5 seats
Party	Candidate	FPv%	Count					
Party	Candidate	FPv%	1	2	3	4	5	6
UUP	Rosemary Barton* †	20.49%	1,289					
UUP	Raymond Farrell* ‡‡	17.62%	1,108					
DUP	David Mahon	9.54%	600	690.2	940	941.4	1,326.4	
SDLP	John Coyle	9.98%	628	630.4	633.4	972.2	1,011.4	1,102.4
Sinn Féin	John Feely	14.20%	893	894	896	931	933.6	933.6
Sinn Féin	Peter Jones	10.40%	654	655	659.2	674.2	676.8	677.8
TUV	Alex Elliott	7.23%	455	548.4	569.6	572.8		
SDLP	Paul Blake	6.58%	414	419.4	420.4			
DUP	James Fleming	3.96%	249	294.6				
Electorate: 10,501 Valid: 6,290 (59.89%) Spoilt: 104 Quota: 1,049 Turnout: 6,394 (60.89%)

== 2011 Election ==
2005: 2 x UUP, 1 x DUP, 1 x Sinn Féin, 1 x SDLP

2011: 2 x UUP, 1 x DUP, 1 x Sinn Féin, 1 x SDLP

2005-2011 Change: No change

Erne North - 5 seats
Party	Candidate	FPv%	Count							
Party	Candidate	FPv%	1	2	3	4	5	6	7	8
Sinn Féin	Phil Flanagan*	21.49%	1,388							
UUP	Raymond Farrell	17.17%	1,109							
UUP	Rosemary Barton	12.89%	833	833.34	1,013.68	1,131.68				
SDLP	John O'Kane*	7.18%	464	631.62	634.62	639.62	640.26	641.49	718.59	1,119.77
DUP	Bert Johnston*	12.43%	803	806.06	842.06	962.06	994.06	1,012.51	1,021.54	1,033.34
DUP	Ray Carscadden	9.09%	587	588.02	600.02	639.02	660.78	668.10	671.13	677.16
SDLP	John Coyle	5.73%	370	436.64	437.98	441.32	441.32	441.68	654.65	
Independent	Gerry Ferguson	5.19%	335	405.04	406.04	411.04	411.04	411.25		
TUV	Alex Elliott	4.78%	309	309.68	331.68					
UUP	David Black	4.06%	262	262.68						
Electorate: 9,454 Valid: 6,460 (68.33%) Spoilt: 141 Quota: 1,077 Turnout: 6,601 (69.82%)

== 2005 Election ==
2001: 2 x UUP, 1 x DUP, 1 x Sinn Féin, 1 x SDLP

2005: 2 x UUP, 1 x DUP, 1 x Sinn Féin, 1 x SDLP

2001-2005 Change: No change

Erne North - 5 seats
Party	Candidate	FPv%	Count						
Party	Candidate	FPv%	1	2	3	4	5	6	7
UUP	Tom Elliott*	26.81%	1,686						
Sinn Féin	Breege McSorley	18.54%	1,166						
DUP	Bert Johnston*	16.48%	1,036	1,149.24					
SDLP	John O'Kane*	11.91%	749	756.22	819.53	829.46	1,273.46		
UUP	Bertie Kerr*	3.24%	204	544.1	545.43	796.67	819.26	904.26	979.86
DUP	Mandy Mahon	11.45%	720	743.94	744.72	825.75	832.94	848.94	872.39
SDLP	Julie Dervan	8.22%	517	521.56	564.98	567.49			
UUP	Gary Wilson	3.34%	210	354.4	354.79				
Electorate: 8,898 Valid: 6,288 (70.67%) Spoilt: 111 Quota: 1,049 Turnout: 6,399 (71.92%)

== 2001 Election ==
1997: 2 x UUP, 1 x DUP, 1 x SDLP, 1 x Sinn Féin

2001: 2 x UUP, 1 x DUP, 1 x SDLP, 1 x Sinn Féin

1997-2001 Change: No change

Erne North - 5 seats
Party	Candidate	FPv%	Count			
Party	Candidate	FPv%	1	2	3	4
Sinn Féin	Joe Cassidy	17.71%	1,181			
DUP	Bert Johnston*	16.69%	1,113			
UUP	Tom Elliott	15.44%	1,030	1,129		
SDLP	John O'Kane	13.06%	871	873	1,322	
UUP	Bertie Kerr*	12.80%	854	926	934	990
UUP	Caldwell McClaughry*	10.27%	685	771	777	803
SDLP	Julie Dervan	8.52%	568	572		
DUP	Billy Gilmore	4.15%	277			
DUP	William Simpson	1.36%	91			
Electorate: 8,880 Valid: 6,670 (75.11%) Spoilt: 134 Quota: 1,112 Turnout: 6,804 (76.62%)

== 1997 Election ==
1993: 2 x UUP, 2 x SDLP, 1 x DUP

1997: 2 x UUP, 1 x SDLP, 1 x DUP, 1 x Sinn Féin

1993-1997 Change: Sinn Féin gain from SDLP

Erne North - 5 seats
Party	Candidate	FPv%	Count			
Party	Candidate	FPv%	1	2	3	4
UUP	Caldwell McClaughry*	16.46%	998	1,028		
SDLP	Tommy Gallagher*	15.39%	933	958	1,400	
DUP	Bert Johnston*	15.69%	951	1,001	1,001	1,002
Sinn Féin	Geraldine Cassidy	12.04%	730	731	783	966
UUP	Bertie Kerr*	15.12%	917	937	939	959
UUP	Tom Elliott	13.99%	848	863	866	868
SDLP	John Dolan	8.68%	526	537		
Alliance	Neville McElderry	1.62%	98			
DUP	Jean Jackson	1.02%	62			
Electorate: 8,516 Valid: 6,063 (71.20%) Spoilt: 98 Quota: 1,011 Turnout: 6,161 (72.35%)

== 1993 Election ==
1989: 2 x UUP, 2 x SDLP, 1 x DUP

1993: 2 x UUP, 2 x SDLP, 1 x DUP

1989-1993 Change: No change

Erne North - 5 seats
Party	Candidate	FPv%	Count				
Party	Candidate	FPv%	1	2	3	4	5
UUP	Caldwell McClaughry*	24.53%	1,486				
DUP	Bert Johnston*	17.04%	1,032				
SDLP	Tommy Gallagher*	16.33%	989	991.56	992.56	1,172.56	
UUP	Bertie Kerr	11.13%	674	847.44	947.68	948.68	949.68
SDLP	John O'Kane*	13.65%	827	831.48	832.8	960.8	1,092.8
UUP	Simon Loane*	7.21%	437	704.52	779.36	780.36	781.36
Sinn Féin	Desmond Donnelly	6.95%	421	421	426		
DUP	John Armstrong	3.17%	192	210.24			
Electorate: 8,201 Valid: 6,058 (73.87%) Spoilt: 113 Quota: 1,010 Turnout: 6,171 (75.25%)

== 1989 Election ==
1985: 2 x UUP, 1 x SDLP, 1 x DUP, 1 x Sinn Féin

1989: 2 x UUP, 2 x SDLP, 1 x DUP

1985-1989 Change: SDLP gain from Sinn Féin

Erne North - 5 seats
Party	Candidate	FPv%	Count				
Party	Candidate	FPv%	1	2	3	4	5
UUP	Caldwell McClaughry*	24.34%	1,516				
DUP	Bert Johnston*	17.88%	1,114				
UUP	Simon Loane*	13.04%	812	1,170.36			
SDLP	John O'Kane*	14.95%	931	932.86	934.79	1,042.32	
SDLP	Tommy Gallagher	12.74%	793	793.62	795.55	839.3	954.62
Sinn Féin	Brian McSorley	10.40%	648	648.93	648.93	649.55	651.1
UUP	Gladys Nixon	4.77%	297	359.93	473.97		
DUP	Victor Milligan	1.89%	118	156.75			
Electorate: 7,782 Valid: 6,229 (80.04%) Spoilt: 110 Quota: 1,039 Turnout: 6,339 (81.46%)

== 1985 Election ==
1985: 2 x UUP, 1 x SDLP, 1 x DUP, 1 x Sinn Féin

Erne North - 5 seats
Party	Candidate	FPv%	Count						
Party	Candidate	FPv%	1	2	3	4	5	6	7
UUP	Caldwell McClaughry*	20.33%	1,291						
DUP	Bert Johnston*	17.14%	1,088						
UUP	Simon Loane	15.56%	988	1,198.78					
Sinn Féin	Stephen Maguire	11.91%	756	756	756.26	758.26	897.26	947.39	947.65
SDLP	John O'Kane*	10.32%	655	655.54	656.19	707.02	720.02	906.46	937.39
SDLP	Tommy Gallagher	6.44%	409	409	409.13	426.7	550.7	703.88	729.14
DUP	Victor Milligan	4.52%	287	301.4	418.66	474.64	475.64	479.21	
SDLP	Dodie Maguire	6.13%	389	389.72	390.5	416.25	436.25		
Irish Independence	Patrick Keown	4.71%	299	299.18	299.31	306.31			
Alliance	John Haslett	2.95%	187	191.32	211.86				
Electorate: 7,711 Valid: 6,349 (82.34%) Spoilt: 67 Quota: 1,059 Turnout: 6,416 (83.21%)
