= 1997 Fermanagh District Council election =

Local government election in Northern Ireland

← 1993	21 May 1997	2001 →

All 23 seats to Fermanagh District Council 12 seats needed for a majority
	First party	Second party	Third party
Party	UUP	Sinn Féin	SDLP
Seats won	9	5	4
Seat change	▼1	▲2	▼1
	Fourth party	Fifth party	Sixth party
Party	DUP	Ind. Nationalist	Independent Socialist
Seats won	2	2	1
Seat change	0	0	0
- Results by district electoral area, shaded by First Preference Votes.

Elections to Fermanagh District Council were held on 21 May 1997 on the same day as the other Northern Irish local government elections. The election used four district electoral areas to elect a total of 23 councillors.

== Election results ==
Fermanagh District Council Election Result 1997
Party	Seats	Gains	Losses	Net gain/loss	Seats %	Votes %	Votes	+/−
UUP	9	0	1	▼1	39.1	40.4	11,642	▲0.9
Sinn Féin	5	2	0	▲2	21.7	23.5	6,770	▲6.4
SDLP	4	0	1	▼1	21.7	17.3	4,976	▼2.0
Ind. Nationalist	2	0	0	0	0.0	7.5	2,159	▼1.9
DUP	2	0	0	0	8.7	7.4	2,123	▼2.1
Independent Socialist	1	0	0	0	0.0	2.0	581	▼1.3
NI Women's Coalition	0	0	0	0	0.0	1.1	319	New
Alliance	0	0	0	0	0.0	0.9	254	▲0.9

Note: "Votes" are the first preference votes.

== Districts summary ==
Results of the Fermanagh District Council election, 1997 by district
Ward	%	Cllrs	%	Cllrs	%	Cllrs	%	Cllrs	%	Cllrs	Total Cllrs
Ward	UUP		Sinn Féin		SDLP		DUP		Others		Total Cllrs
Enniskillen	47.2	3	16.8	1	15.3	1	9.5	1	11.2	1	7
Erne East	36.3	2	32.8	2	15.3	1	4.5	0	11.1	1	6
Erne North	45.6	2	12.0	1	24.1	1	16.7	1	1.6	0	5
Erne West	32.9	2	30.2	1	15.8	1	0.0	0	21.1	1	5
Total	40.4	9	23.5	5	17.3	4	7.4	2	11.4	3	23

== District results ==
=== Enniskillen ===
1993: 3 x UUP, 1 x Sinn Féin, 1 x SDLP, 1 x DUP, 1 x Independent Socialist
1997: 3 x UUP, 1 x Sinn Féin, 1 x SDLP, 1 x DUP, 1 x Independent Socialist
1993-1997 Change: No change

Enniskillen - 7 seats
Party	Candidate	FPv%	Count							
Party	Candidate	FPv%	1	2	3	4	5	6	7	8
UUP	Samuel Foster*	26.31%	2,055							
Sinn Féin	Gerry McHugh*	16.81%	1,313							
UUP	Raymond Ferguson*	9.84%	769	1,325.4						
UUP	Basil Johnston	8.77%	685	866.48	982.64					
SDLP	Eamon Flanagan*	11.87%	927	928.56	930.16	1,030.48				
Independent Socialist	Davy Kettyles*	7.44%	581	588.8	594.24	672.78	679.81	732.88	811.38	1,002.38
DUP	Joseph Dodds*	7.44%	581	664.72	700.24	700.24	700.24	702.24	829.64	833.53
UUP	Ethel Gregg	2.24%	175	379.88	546.92	546.92	547.11	596.71	643.79	660.02
SDLP	John Rooney	3.42%	267	267.52	267.84	381.69	420.64	438.34	514.05	
NI Women's Coalition	Margaret McCaffrey	1.83%	143	144.04	144.36	180	183.99	215.99		
DUP	Robert Irvine	2.05%	160	175.6	186.48	186.48	186.48	187.48		
Alliance	John Haslett	2.00%	156	164.32	166.88	170.18	170.94			
Electorate: 12,960 Valid: 7,812 (60.28%) Spoilt: 117 Quota: 977 Turnout: 7,929 (61.18%)

=== Erne East ===
1993: 3 x UUP, 1 x Sinn Féin, 1 x SDLP, 1 x Independent Nationalist
1997: 2 x UUP, 2 x Sinn Féin, 1 x SDLP, 1 x Independent Nationalist
1993-1997 Change: Sinn Féin gain from UUP

Erne East - 6 seats
Party	Candidate	FPv%	Count						
Party	Candidate	FPv%	1	2	3	4	5	6	7
UUP	Harold Andrews	14.04%	1,149	1,150	1,281				
Sinn Féin	Brian McCaffrey	11.22%	918	944	946	1,385			
Sinn Féin	Ruth Lynch	13.11%	1,073	1,078	1,078	1,246			
SDLP	Fergus McQuillan*	10.96%	897	1,149	1,150	1,193			
Ind. Nationalist	Tony McPhillips*	11.11%	909	961	963	1,000	1,137	1,137	1,194
UUP	Cecil Noble*	11.39%	932	932	1,071	1,071	1,071	1,104.3	1,104.3
UUP	Jean McVitty*	10.83%	886	888	962	963	964	1,042.3	1,043.3
Sinn Féin	Hugh O'Reilly	8.48%	694	699	699				
DUP	Paul Robinson	4.51%	369	371					
SDLP	Marie O'Neill	4.34%	355						
Electorate: 10,446 Valid: 8,182 (78.33%) Spoilt: 141 Quota: 1,169 Turnout: 8,323 (79.68%)

=== Erne North ===
1993: 2 x UUP, 2 x SDLP, 1 x DUP
1997: 2 x UUP, 1 x SDLP, 1 x DUP, 1 x Sinn Féin
1993-1997 Change: Sinn Féin gain from SDLP

Erne North - 5 seats
Party	Candidate	FPv%	Count			
Party	Candidate	FPv%	1	2	3	4
UUP	Caldwell McClaughry*	16.46%	998	1,028		
SDLP	Tommy Gallagher*	15.39%	933	958	1,400	
DUP	Bert Johnston*	15.69%	951	1,001	1,001	1,002
Sinn Féin	Geraldine Cassidy	12.04%	730	731	783	966
UUP	Bertie Kerr*	15.12%	917	937	939	959
UUP	Tom Elliott	13.99%	848	863	866	868
SDLP	John Dolan	8.68%	526	537		
Alliance	Neville McElderry	1.62%	98			
DUP	Jean Jackson	1.02%	62			
Electorate: 8,516 Valid: 6,063 (71.20%) Spoilt: 98 Quota: 1,011 Turnout: 6,161 (72.35%)

=== Erne West ===
1993: 2 x UUP, 1 x Sinn Féin, 1 x SDLP, 1 x Independent Nationalist
1997: 2 x UUP, 1 x Sinn Féin, 1 x SDLP, 1 x Independent Nationalist
1993-1997 Change: No change

Erne West - 5 seats
Party	Candidate	FPv%	Count				
Party	Candidate	FPv%	1	2	3	4	5
UUP	Wilson Elliott*	23.88%	1,616				
Ind. Nationalist	Patrick McCaffrey*	18.47%	1,250				
Sinn Féin	Robin Martin*	17.42%	1,179				
SDLP	Gerry Gallagher*	15.83%	1,071	1,077.6	1,183.6		
UUP	Derrick Nixon*	9.04%	612	1,078.8	1,088.2	1,100.6	1,113.6
Sinn Féin	Stephen Huggett	12.75%	863	863.9	892.2	996.8	1,025.8
NI Women's Coalition	Imelda Maguire	2.60%	176	180.2			
Electorate: 8,872 Valid: 6,767 (76.27%) Spoilt: 149 Quota: 1,128 Turnout: 6,916 (77.95%)
