= Gildernew =

Gildernew is an Irish surname. Notable people with the surname include:

- Michelle Gildernew (born 1970), Irish politician
- Colm Gildernew (born 1969), Irish politician
