= Fermanagh and South Tyrone =

Fermanagh and South Tyrone may refer to two electoral divisions in Northern Ireland:

- Fermanagh and South Tyrone (Assembly constituency)
- Fermanagh and South Tyrone (UK Parliament constituency)
