= Richie McPhillips =

Politician from Northern Ireland (born 1957)

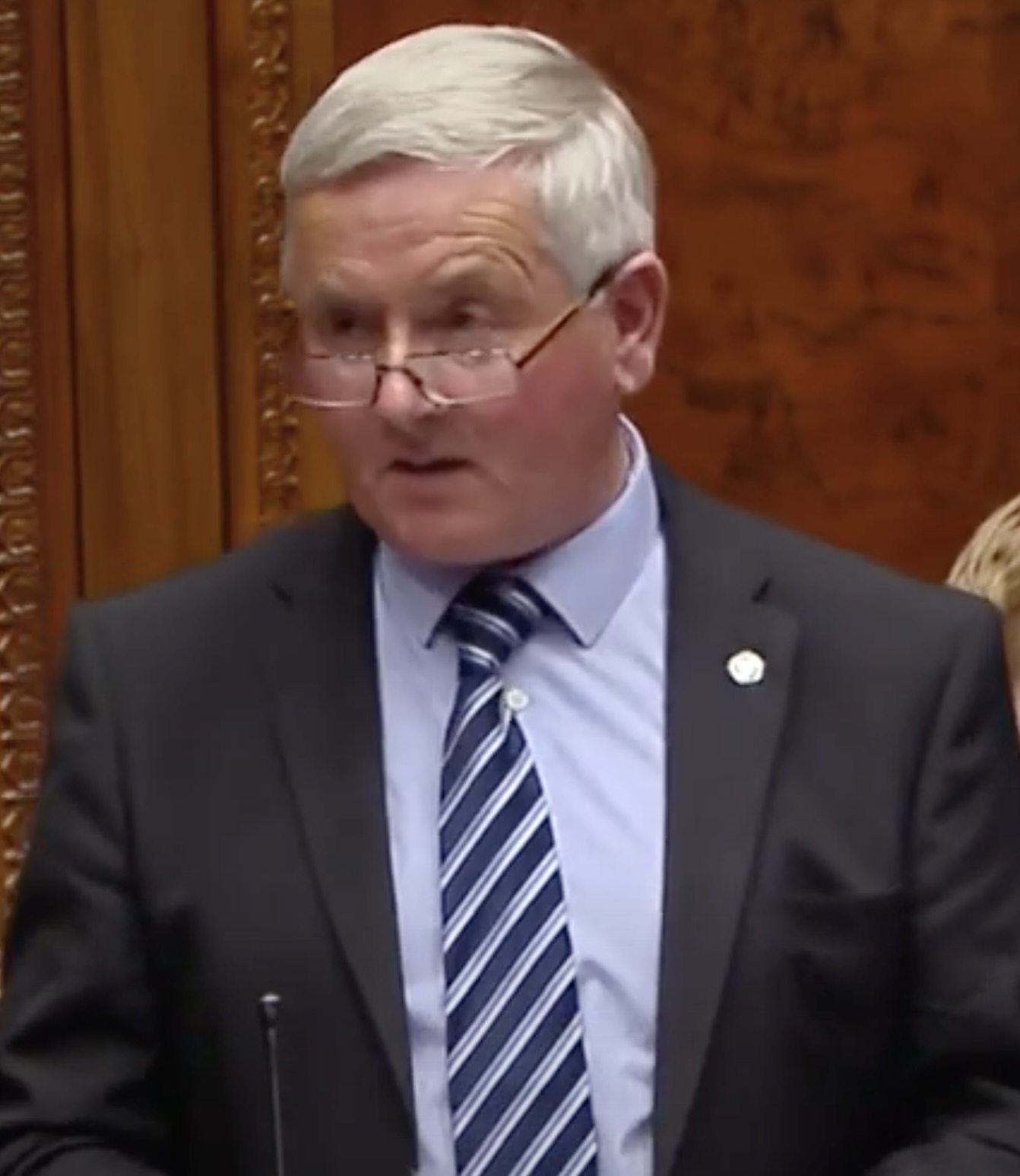
- McPhillips in 2016

Member of the Northern Ireland Assembly for Fermanagh and South Tyrone
- In office 5 May 2016 – 30 January 2017
- Preceded by: Phil Flanagan
- Succeeded by: Jemma Dolan

Member of Fermanagh and Omagh District Council
- In office 22 May 2014 – 5 May 2016
- Preceded by: New council
- Succeeded by: Garbhan McPhillips
- Constituency: Erne East

Personal details
- Born: Richard Patrick McPhillips; 7 July 1957 (age 68) Newtownbutler, County Fermanagh, Northern Ireland
- Party: Social Democratic and Labour Party
- Spouse: Agnes McPhillips
- Children: 3
- Website: http://www.sdlp.ie/people/ritchie-mcphillips/

Richard Patrick "Richie" McPhillips (born 7 July 1957) is a Social Democratic and Labour Party (SDLP) politician from Northern Ireland. He was a Member of the Legislative Assembly (MLA) for Fermanagh and South Tyrone from the 2016 Assembly election until his defeat 10 months later at the 2017 election.

Having previously worked as an insurance broker, he was elected in the 2014 Local Council Elections to serve as a councillor for the newly established Fermanagh and Omagh District Council (amassing 1,015 first preference votes (12.9%) in the Erne East DEA).

Northern Ireland Assembly
Preceded by Phil Flanagan	MLA for Fermanagh and South Tyrone; 2016–2017	Succeeded by Jemma Dolan
