= Neil Somerville =

Politician from Northern Ireland (born 1973)

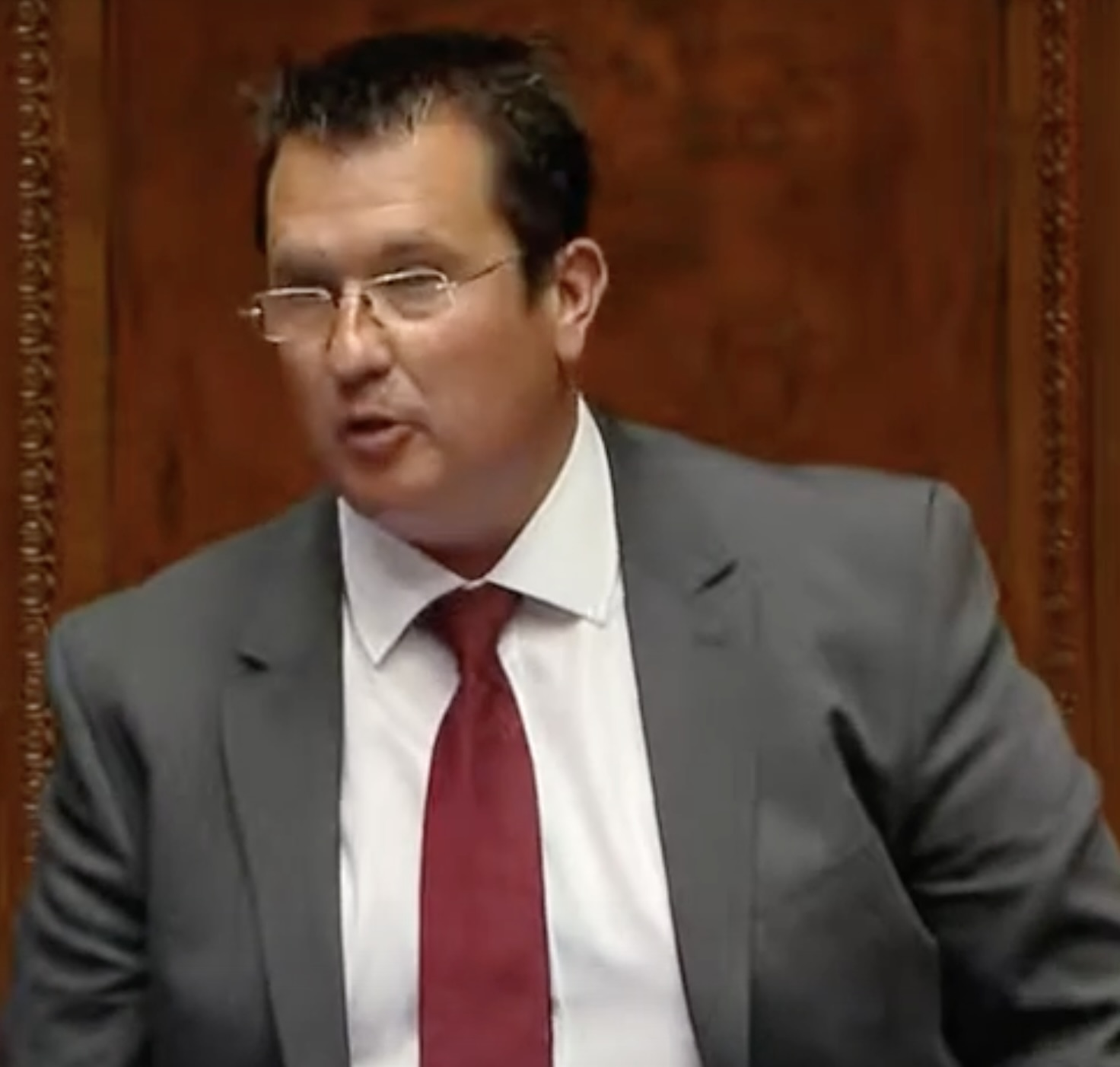
- Somerville in 2015

Member of the Legislative Assembly for Fermanagh and South Tyrone
- In office 29 June 2015 – 25 January 2016
- Preceded by: Tom Elliott
- Succeeded by: Alastair Patterson

Member of Dungannon and South Tyrone Borough Council
- In office 12 June 2012 – 22 May 2014
- Preceded by: Jim Hamilton
- Succeeded by: Council abolished
- Constituency: Blackwater

Personal details
- Born: 15 May 1973 (age 52) Aughnacloy, Northern Ireland
- Party: Ulster Unionist Party
- Spouse: Sandra Somerville
- Children: 4

Neil Somerville (born 15 May 1973) is a Northern Irish businessman and former Ulster Unionist Party (UUP) politician. He was a Member of the Northern Ireland Assembly (MLA) for Fermanagh and South Tyrone between 2015 and 2016, having succeeded Tom Elliott in June 2015, following the latter's election to Westminster.

He resigned due to ill health in January 2016.

Northern Ireland Assembly
Preceded by Tom Elliott	MLA for Fermanagh and South Tyrone; 2015–2016	Succeeded by Alastair Patterson
