= Emma DeSouza =

Irish writer, political commentator

Emma DeSouza is an Irish writer, political commentator, and campaigner.

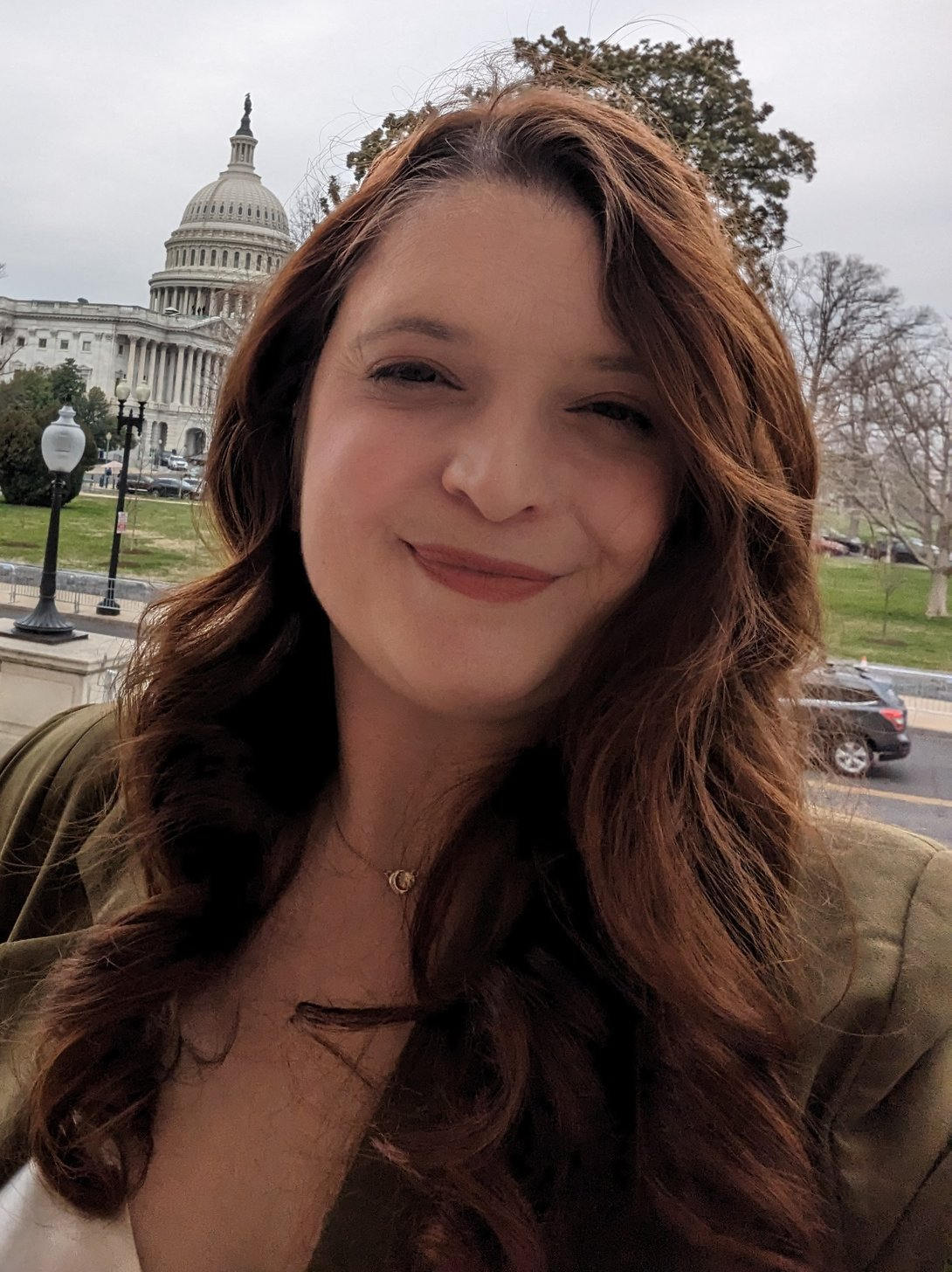
Emma DeSouza at the US Capitol Building

== Family reunion law case ==
DeSouza took forward a lengthy court challenge against the British Home Secretary over her right under the terms of the Good Friday Agreement to be accepted as an Irish citizen for the purposes of European Union family reunion rights with her American husband, Jake. (Note: In British law as it stood, this meant that her husband was subject to conditions for "indefinite leave to remain" that did not apply to Irish citizens resident in the United Kingdom.) DeSouza was born in Magherafelt, County Londonderry and thus legally a British citizen. DeSouza argued that she had always identified as an Irish citizen (as is her right under the Agreement) and had only ever held an Irish passport (and never a British one). The Home Office declared that she must either reapply as a British citizen or renounce her British citizenship. A "First Tier" immigration tribunal found in her favour but the "Upper Tribunal" overturned that decision when the Home Office appealed. Nevertheless, the Home Office granted Jake leave to remain, albeit without formally conceding her case and Mrs DeSouza withdrew her court appeal, stating that the concession from the Home Office had removed the foundation for their legal challenge, "Therefore, we have been left with no other option but to withdraw our application to appeal."

The case resulted in a temporary concession by the British Home Office to allow citizens in Northern Ireland to bring in foreign-born partners under the EU family status regulations as a 'person of Northern Ireland', defined as an 'Irish citizen, British citizen, or dual British and Irish citizen.' Immigration solicitor Una Boyd stated that, "The impact of these changes on families who would otherwise be separated by the UK Immigration Rules can’t be overstated." This result, although time-limited, was cited as a significant victory for DeSouza. Following the case, DeSouza withdrew her pending court appeal stating that the changes "forced through by our case will now allow Jake to remain in the United Kingdom on the basis of my Irish citizenship and require the Home Office to respect my right under the Good Friday (Belfast) Agreement to be accepted as Irish."

Taoiseach Leo Varadkar singled out DeSouza for praise during an address to an audience in Washington, D.C., which included U.S. House Speaker Nancy Pelosi and Northern Ireland Secretary Brandon Lewis, at the National Building Museum.

== Career ==
DeSouza writes for several publications as a political commentator including the Irish Times, The Guardian, Byline Times, the Irish News, The National, Euronews, Irish Examiner, and Journal.ie.

DeSouza's other campaign work includes voting rights for Irish citizens abroad and campaigning for full implementation of the Good Friday Agreement. In 2021 she led in creating the All-island Women's Forum within the National Women's Council of Ireland, acting as Chair and Facilitator for 2021 and 2022. DeSouza said, "The appetite for meaningful structures to provide greater engagement and understanding on this island is evident from the overwhelming interest we have received in the formation of this forum." The Forum operates as a cross-border peacebuilding structure.

DeSouza was one of several people targeted by the columnist Eoghan Harris under his anonymous Twitter account Barbara J. Pym. According to DeSouza, "Much of the abuse was levied at Northern Ireland nationalists, or those deemed nationalists by Harris".

DeSouza ran as an independent candidate in Fermanagh and South Tyrone at the 2022 Northern Ireland Assembly election. She said she believed the election had the potential to significantly disrupt the status quo of Northern politics and that "[k]ey to that change will be independent voices unafraid to join the growing demographic of 'others' not content being shuffled into outdated political movements with partisan ideals". She received 249 votes and was eliminated on the first count.

In 2023 DeSouza founded a new Civic-led participatory structure ahead of 25th anniversary of the Belfast/Good Friday Agreement. The Civic Initiative brings together a wide-range of civic society groups to work in advancing peace, reconciliation and well-being in Northern Ireland. Announcing the Initiative DeSouza said, : "Communities across Northern Ireland have never lacked ideas, but we are concerned at the lack of structure and framework necessary to harness those ideas – the Civic Initiative aims to provide such a structure."

In March 2023 DeSouza spoke at a conference in Washington DC alongside Secretary Hillary Clinton, Taoiseach Leo Varadkar, former President Mary Robinson and others. DeSouza was introduced as a next generation leader in peacebuilding and spoke of a need to refocus on implementing the Belfast Good Friday Agreement.

In September 2023 DeSouza was announced as the Director of a transatlantic policy programme with New York based diplomacy NGO the National Committee on American Foreign Policy.
