= 2001 Fermanagh District Council election =

Local government election in Northern Ireland

← 1997	7 June 2001	2005 →

All 23 seats to Fermanagh District Council 12 seats needed for a majority
	First party	Second party	Third party
Party	Sinn Féin	UUP	SDLP
Seats won	9	7	4
Seat change	▲4	▼2	0
	Fourth party	Fifth party	Sixth party
Party	DUP	Independent	Ind. Nationalist
Seats won	2	1	0
Seat change	0	▲1	▼2
	Seventh party
Party	Independent Socialist
Seats won	0
Seat change	▼1
- Fermanagh 2001 Fermanagh District Council election results by district

Elections to Fermanagh District Council were held on 7 June 2001 on the same day as the other Northern Irish local government elections and used four district electoral areas to elect a total of 23 councillors.

== Election results ==
Fermanagh District Council Election Result 2001
Party	Seats	Gains	Losses	Net gain/loss	Seats %	Votes %	Votes	+/−
Sinn Féin	9	4	0	▲4	39.1	33.5	10,775	▲10.0
UUP	7	0	2	▼2	30.4	30.8	9,915	▼9.6
SDLP	4	0	0	0	17.4	18.7	6,010	▲1.4
DUP	2	0	0	▲2	8.7	12.1	3,885	▲4.7
Independent	1	1	0	▲1	0.0	4.3	1,420	▲4.3
UK Unionist	0	0	0	0	0.0	0.6	182	New

Note: "Votes" are the first preference votes.

== Districts summary ==
Results of the Fermanagh District Council election, 2001 by district
Ward	%	Cllrs	%	Cllrs	%	Cllrs	%	Cllrs	%	Cllrs	Total Cllrs
Ward	Sinn Féin		UUP		SDLP		DUP		Others		Total Cllrs
Enniskillen	25.2	2	33.4	2	17.8	1	12.6	1	11.0	1	7
Erne East	42.3	3	27.0	2	14.9	1	9.3	0	6.5	0	6
Erne North	17.7	1	38.5	2	21.6	1	22.2	1	0.0	0	5
Erne West	48.2	3	24.8	1	21.6	1	5.4	0	0.0	0	5
Total	33.5	9	30.8	7	18.7	4	12.1	2	4.9	1	23

== District results ==
=== Enniskillen ===
1997: 3 x UUP, 1 x Sinn Féin, 1 x SDLP, 1 x DUP, 1 x Independent Socialist
2001: 2 x UUP, 2 x Sinn Féin, 1 x SDLP, 1 x DUP, 1 x Independent
1997-2001 Change: Sinn Féin gain from UUP, Independent Socialist becomes Independent

Enniskillen - 7 seats
Party	Candidate	FPv%	Count							
Party	Candidate	FPv%	1	2	3	4	5	6	7	8
UUP	Raymond Ferguson*	15.58%	1,486							
Sinn Féin	Gerry McHugh*	14.04%	1,339							
Sinn Féin	Paddy Gilgunn	11.22%	1,070							
DUP	Joseph Dodds*	11.49%	1,096	1,105.2	1,105.31	1,290.31				
SDLP	Frank Britton	9.79%	934	935.8	940.86	940.97	950.28	1,513.28		
Independent	Davy Kettyles*	9.03%	861	871.2	876.59	882.79	902.99	1,027.01	1,312.31	
UUP	Robert Irvine	7.43%	709	958.4	858.73	902.33	1,104.53	1,113.53	1,133.23	1,174.73
UUP	Basil Johnston*	6.17%	589	547.2	647.31	671.71	898.91	904.31	917.81	947.51
SDLP	Eamon Flanagan*	8.03%	766	769.6	775.98	777.18	780.98			
UUP	Barbara Stewart	4.22%	403	458	458.44	478.44				
UK Unionist	Alan Madill	1.91%	182	184	184					
DUP	Samuel Dunne	1.10%	105	107.8	108.02					
Electorate: 13,226 Valid: 9,540 (72.13%) Spoilt: 184 Quota: 1,193 Turnout: 9,724 (73.52%)

=== Erne East ===
1997: 2 x Sinn Féin, 2 x UUP, 1 x SDLP, 1 x Independent Nationalist
2001: 3 x Sinn Féin, 2 x UUP, 1 x SDLP
1997-2001 Change: Sinn Féin gain from Independent Nationalist

Erne East - 6 seats
Party	Candidate	FPv%	Count				
Party	Candidate	FPv%	1	2	3	4	5
Sinn Féin	Ruth Lynch*	16.46%	1,428				
UUP	Harold Andrews*	15.53%	1,348				
SDLP	Fergus McQuillan*	14.90%	1,293				
Sinn Féin	Brian McCaffrey*	13.72%	1,191	1,334.39			
Sinn Féin	Tom O'Reilly	12.10%	1,050	1,075.61	1,075.61	1,402.61	
UUP	Cecil Noble*	11.50%	998	998.13	1,091.89	1,105.67	1,141.67
DUP	Paul Robinson	9.35%	811	811.13	822.01	827.51	837.51
Independent	Michael McPhillips	6.44%	559	570.05	570.45		
Electorate: 10,700 Valid: 8,678 (81.10%) Spoilt: 165 Quota: 1,240 Turnout: 8,843 (82.64%)

=== Erne North ===
1997: 2 x UUP, 1 x DUP, 1 x SDLP, 1 x Sinn Féin
2001: 2 x UUP, 1 x DUP, 1 x SDLP, 1 x Sinn Féin
1997-2001 Change: No change

Erne North - 5 seats
Party	Candidate	FPv%	Count			
Party	Candidate	FPv%	1	2	3	4
Sinn Féin	Joe Cassidy	17.71%	1,181			
DUP	Bert Johnston*	16.69%	1,113			
UUP	Tom Elliott	15.44%	1,030	1,129		
SDLP	John O'Kane	13.06%	871	873	1,322	
UUP	Bertie Kerr*	12.80%	854	926	934	990
UUP	Caldwell McClaughry*	10.27%	685	771	777	803
SDLP	Julie Dervan	8.52%	568	572		
DUP	Billy Gilmore	4.15%	277			
DUP	William Simpson	1.36%	91			
Electorate: 8,880 Valid: 6,670 (75.11%) Spoilt: 134 Quota: 1,112 Turnout: 6,804 (76.62%)

=== Erne West ===
1997: 2 x UUP, 1 x Sinn Féin, 1 x SDLP, 1 x Independent Nationalist
2001: 3 x Sinn Féin, 1 x UUP, 1 x SDLP
1997-2001 Change: Sinn Féin (two seats) gain from UUP and Independent Nationalist

Erne West - 5 seats
Party	Candidate	FPv%	Count		
Party	Candidate	FPv%	1	2	3
SDLP	Gerry Gallagher*	21.62%	1,578		
Sinn Féin	Pat Cox	17.34%	1,266		
Sinn Féin	Stephen Huggett	15.22%	1,111	1,112	1,298.66
Sinn Féin	Robin Martin*	15.60%	1,139	1,140	1,253.22
UUP	Wilson Elliott*	13.44%	981	1,179	1,217.08
UUP	Derrick Nixon*	11.40%	832	979	1,000.42
DUP	David Black	5.37%	392		
Electorate: 9,196 Valid: 7,299 (79.37%) Spoilt: 167 Quota: 1,217 Turnout: 7,466 (81.19%)
