= Rosemary Barton (politician) =

Unionist politician from Northern Ireland

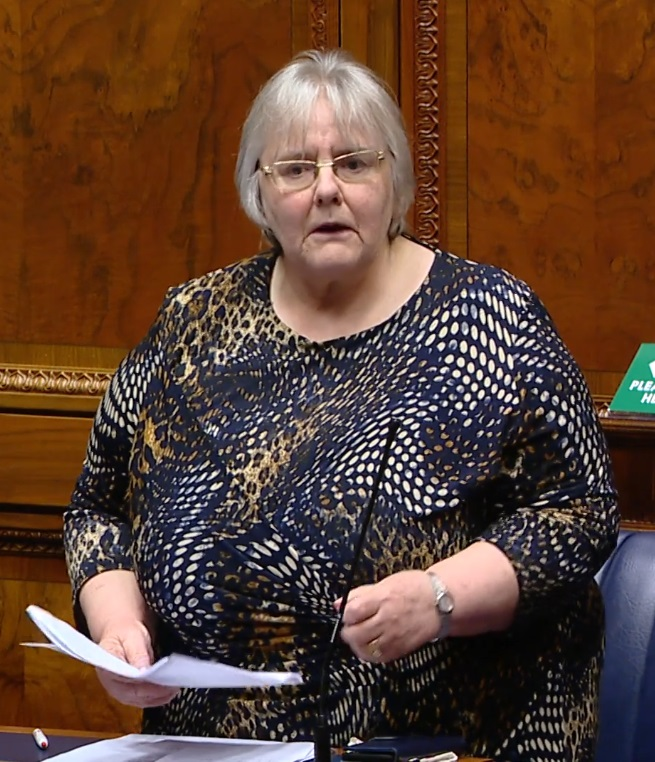
- Barton in 2021

Member of Fermanagh and Omagh District Council
- Incumbent
- Assumed office 21 October 2024
- Preceded by: Diana Armstrong
- Constituency: Erne North
- In office 16 November 2022 – 18 May 2023
- Preceded by: Bert Wilson
- Succeeded by: Shirley Hawkes
- Constituency: Mid Tyrone
- In office 22 May 2014 – 5 May 2016
- Preceded by: Council created
- Succeeded by: Diana Armstrong
- Constituency: Erne North

Member of the Legislative Assembly for Fermanagh and South Tyrone
- In office 5 May 2016 – 27 March 2022
- Preceded by: Alastair Patterson
- Succeeded by: Tom Elliott

Member of Fermanagh District Council
- In office 5 May 2011 – 22 May 2014
- Preceded by: Tom Elliot
- Succeeded by: Council abolished
- Constituency: Erne North

Personal details
- Born: Margaret Elizabeth Rosemary Gregg; 26 July 1957 (age 68) Clontivrin, Newtownbutler, County Fermanagh, Northern Ireland
- Party: Ulster Unionist Party
- Spouse: Marcus Barton
- Occupation: Politician
- Profession: Teacher

Margaret Elizabeth Rosemary Barton (née Gregg) (born 26 July 1957) is an Ulster Unionist Party (UUP) politician and former schoolteacher who has been a Fermanagh and Omagh Councillor for the Erne North DEA since October 2024, having previously represented the area from 2014 to 2016. Barton was also a Member of the Legislative Assembly (MLA) for Fermanagh and South Tyrone from 2016 to 2022. She lost her seat in the 2022 Northern Ireland Assembly election, and was succeeded by The Lord Elliot of Ballinamallard.

== Career ==
A native of County Fermanagh, Barton worked as a secondary schoolteacher in Kesh. She was also a schoolteacher at Devenish College. During that time, she taught the future Northern Ireland national football team player Kyle Lafferty.

=== Political career ===
At the 2011 local elections, she was elected to Fermanagh District Council as an Ulster Unionist Party representative for the Erne North District.

She was elected to the successor Fermanagh and Omagh District Council at the 2014 local elections, again representing Erne North. Barton was elected to the Northern Ireland Assembly at the 2016 election as the third woman elected to represent Fermanagh and South Tyrone alongside the First Minister of Northern Ireland Arlene Foster and Michelle Gildernew. Her election as an MLA meant that she was forced to vacate her seat on the District Council. Barton joined cross-community calls for an independent inquiry headed by the Lord Chief Justice of Northern Ireland into the Renewable Heat Incentive scandal.

Barton retained her seat in the 2017 Assembly election, after Fermanagh and South Tyrone lost one seat, in common with all other constituencies, after the Assembly Members (Reduction of Numbers) Act (Northern Ireland) 2016 which led to the Democratic Unionist Party's Lord Morrow missing out. She would become the UUP's education spokesperson in the Assembly. During the 2018 Gaelic football season, Barton suggested Fermanagh GAA fans who "continually talk about the GAA team" in workplaces made unionist colleagues "apprehensive" and "uncomfortable" and amounted to "latent intimidation".

Barton lost her seat to running mate Tom Elliott at the 2022 Assembly election, polling 2,912 first-preference votes (5.45%), and was eliminated on the third count.

In November 2022, she was co-opted as a councillor for the Mid Tyrone District, succeeding UUP veteran, Bert Wilson. At the 2023 local elections, Barton was defeated by the DUP's Shirley Hawkes.

In October 2024, following the co-option of Erne North councillor Diana Armstrong to the Assembly, Barton replaced her on the council.

== Personal life ==
After having qualified as a teacher, Barton joined the Young Farmers' Clubs of Ulster in 1980 and met her future husband there. They married in 1984 in the Church of Ireland church in Clones, County Monaghan, Republic of Ireland. Barton expressed surprise when she was informed by the Belfast Telegraph that Wikipedia had cited her age incorrectly in 2017.

Northern Ireland Assembly
Preceded by Alastair Patterson	MLA for Fermanagh and South Tyrone; 2016 – 2022	Succeeded by Tom Elliott
