= Phil Flanagan =

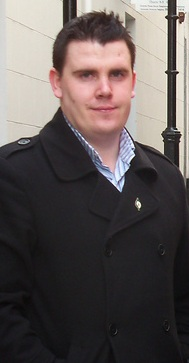
- Phil Flanagan MLA in Enniskillen, May 2011

Member of the Northern Ireland Assembly for Fermanagh and South Tyrone
- In office 12 May 2011 – May 2016
- Preceded by: Tommy Gallagher
- Succeeded by: Richie McPhillips

Member of Fermanagh District Council
- In office 10 May 2011 – 28 August 2011
- Preceded by: Breege McSorley
- Succeeded by: Stephen Huggett
- Constituency: Erne North
- In office 5 October 2009 – 10 May 2011
- Preceded by: Domhnall Ó Cobhthaigh
- Succeeded by: Barry Doherty
- Constituency: Erne West

Personal details
- Born: 16 July 1984 (age 41) Garrison, County Fermanagh, Northern Ireland
- Party: Sinn Féin
- Website: fermanaghsouthtyronesf.com

Phil Flanagan (born 16 July 1984) is an Irish Gaelic Athletic Association (GAA) executive and former Sinn Féin politician who was a Member of the Northern Ireland Assembly (MLA) for Fermanagh and South Tyrone from 2011 to 2016. He was the Sinn Féin spokesperson on Enterprise, Trade and Investment, and was also a Fermanagh District Councillor for the Erne West DEA from 2009 to 2011, and then briefly for Erne North in 2011.

== Biography ==
Flanagan is originally from Garrison, County Fermanagh. Educated at St Michael's College, Enniskillen, he is a former retail manager and small-business owner.

Flanagan was co-opted to Fermanagh District Council in 2009, representing the Erne West District. He was re-elected to the Council at the 2011 election, this time for the Erne North District. He was also elected to the Northern Ireland Assembly in the Assembly election held that same day, representing Fermanagh and South Tyrone.

Flanagan later resigned from his council seat in August 2011, in line with Sinn Féin party policy on dual mandates, and was subsequently replaced on the council by Stephen Huggett.

In references to the Seán Quinn case, Flanagan stated that, "It is not up to the media, to politicians or to anyone else to determine the outcome of this case. That decision needs to be made by a judge and the sooner that happens and a clear outcome is decided, the better it will be for all concerned."

In December 2015 it was announced that Flanagan would not run in the May 2016 Assembly election, when he failed to gain the necessary support from delegates at a Fermanagh South Tyrone constituency selection convention. In January 2016, at a re-convened selection convention, he was put back on the party ticket at the expense of Michelle Gildernew. In February 2016 Sinn Féin decided to run an extra candidate in Fermanagh South Tyrone and the extremely popular Gildernew was added back on to party ticket.

During the Assembly election on 5 May 2016, Flanagan polled 3,449 first preference votes, lost his seat and was the first Sinn Féin candidate to be eliminated from the count.

After stepping away from politics, following his electoral defeat in 2016, Flanagan became the Vice Chair of the County Fermanagh GAA Board in December 2016. In June 2018 Mr Flanagan was awarded over five thousand pounds in damages when he was discriminated against by Citizens Advice on grounds of his political opinion.

He lives in Tempo.

== Controversies ==
- In 2011 it was revealed that Flanagan had been suspended from his previous employment during a probe into higher than usual expenditure from the shops petty cash. He denied any wrongdoing and said the £2000 of petty cash had been used to buy coffee and tea as the shop had no kitchen unlike other shops in their chain.
- In 2012 he tweeted remarks about Tom Elliott and Mike Nesbitt being "clampits." Also in 2012 he posted a comment on Facebook about the village of Clabby being a "black hole." In 2012 he also referred to Enniskillen, a town he represents, looking "like crap" in a tweet.
- In July 2013 Phil Flanagan retweeted a sexually explicit comment about the birth of Prince George. He later removed the retweet saying that he "misconstrued the meaning" of the tweet and apologised "for any offence that this may have caused anyone.".
- In 2014, Flanagan tweeted comments about Tom Elliott's career in the UDR which he later removed from Twitter. In January 2016 the MLA agreed to apologise and pay compensation and legal costs to Mr Elliott over the defamatory message. The apology read: "On May 1st 2014 I posted a tweet alleging that Tom Elliott was responsible for harassing and shooting people during his service with the UDR. I now accept this was untrue and wholly without foundation and I apologise for all offence caused."
- In February 2015 he tweeted comments suggesting that William of Orange was a terrorist.
- In August 2015 he tweeted that a public sector organisation (Roads Service) resurfaced a road for 12 July and yet wouldn't be aware that a major GAA game was being played. He refused to apologise for his remarks saying he was only joking.
- Also in August 2015 he got into a war of words on Twitter with Máiría Cahill which resulted in him tweeting the following apology, "I'm sorry if my tweet earlier caused any upset or offence."
- In November 2015 when asked whether ISIS were terrorists he said he was not comfortable with the way organisations were demonised by being labelled terrorists. When he was later criticised for his remarks he stated on his Twitter account that he believed ISIS to be terrorists.

== Court Case and Damages ==
On 1 May 2014, Flanagan tweeted the following comment; "Tom Elliot talks to @StephenNolan about the past. I wonder if he will reveal how many people he harassed or shot as a member of the UDR". He removed the tweet one hour later after it was seen by 167 of his followers with six of them re-tweeting it.

After Mr Elliott was made aware of the tweet his solicitors contacted Mr Flanagan asking for an apology and damages but received no reply. Mr Elliott then issued legal proceedings in June 2014 which resulted in Mr Flanagan agreeing that he would publish an apology on Twitter and that damages should be agreed. Although agreeing to offer an apology and agree damages this never materialised and Mr Elliott proceeded to court to enforce the agreement that was made. This came to court in January 2016. On 8 January 2016 Mr Flanagan agreed, in court, to apologise and pay compensation and legal costs to Mr Elliott over the defamatory message posted on Twitter. The apology which was posted on Twitter read: "On May 1st 2014 I posted a tweet alleging that Tom Elliott was responsible for harassing and shooting people during his service with the UDR. I now accept this was untrue and wholly without foundation and I apologise for all offence caused."

The damages were not decided on until 3 February 2016. The Judge awarded damages of £75,000 because of the serious nature of the defamation, Mr Flanagan initially ignoring Mr Elliott's solicitors, his refusal to offer an apology until the date of the hearing and his failure to make an offer of compensation. The judge than reduced the award by 35% which brought it down to £48,750 because of Mr Flanagan's apology and offer to use the amends procedure. The Judge said he would have reduced it by "fifty percent if the response had been in an appropriate timescale, if the defendant had actually published the apology and if he had offered a realistic amount in compensation". The Stormont Assembly insurers, AIG, refused to indemnify Mr Flanagan for the damages or costs of the case so he sued them. On 1 June 2016, Mr Justice Stevens ruled that AIG did not have to cover him as the comments about Elliott were clearly defamatory. The result of the 1 June ruling meant Flanagan must pay the £48,750 to Elliott, all Elliott's legal expenses in his case, and all of AIG's expenses in their case. He also has to pay his own expenses from both cases.

A week after losing his MLA seat in May 2016 Mr Flanagan said he was unable to pay the damages owed to Mr Elliott and as such he was "not going to lose too much sleep over it." In June 2018 Tom Elliott, former MP for Fermanagh and South Tyrone, announced that he had not received any money from Mr Flanagan and urged him to honour his debt to him. Mr Elliott cited the £20,000 payment Phil Flanagan received when he lost his MLA seat and the £5,865 he got in damages in an Employment Tribunal in June 2018.

== Stormont Standards Commissioner ==
At least two complaints have been made about Phil Flanagan to the Stormont Standards Commissioner with one other person at least threatening to report him for comments he made. If a complaint is not found to be admissible the complaint is not made public and nothing comes from it. If the Commissioner finds the complaint to be admissible he will investigate the complaint and send his findings to the Committee for Standards and Privileges.

Only one complaint about Mr Flanagan has been found admissible so far, which was his re-tweeting of the following joke; "The news says that the duchess doll entered the hospital by the back entrance. If William had done the same we wouldn't have to suffer this balls". Although the NI Assembly Commissioner for Standards thought it worth investigating he determined Flanagan had not broken the Code of Conduct for MLAs.

In his report the commissioner was critical of Mr Flanagan, stating that "while Mr Flanagan's retweet was offensive it was a crude 'joke' which demeaned Mr Flanagan rather than the Royal Family." He also stated that it was "hard to accept" when Mr Flanagan claimed "that he initially believed the original tweet to be an innocent joke." He went on to say his "explanation may in the eyes of some have cast doubt on Mr Flanagan's integrity."

Northern Ireland Assembly
Preceded by Tommy Gallagher	MLA for Fermanagh and South Tyrone; 2011 – 2016	Succeeded by Richie McPhillips
