= Alastair Patterson =

Northern Irish politician (born 1972)

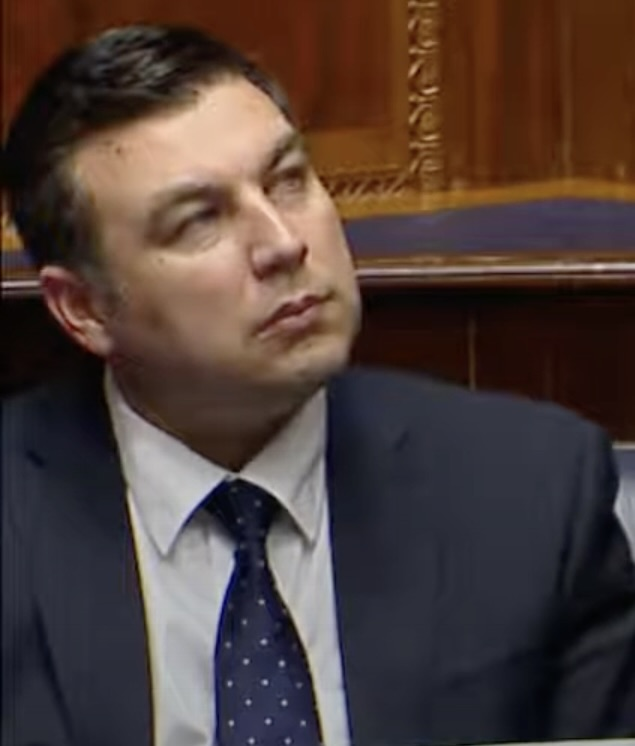
- Patterson in 2016

Member of the Legislative Assembly for Fermanagh and South Tyrone
- In office 27 January 2016 – 6 May 2016
- Preceded by: Neil Somerville
- Succeeded by: Rosemary Barton

Personal details
- Born: 14 December 1972 (age 53) Castlederg, Northern Ireland
- Party: Democratic Unionist Party (since June 2016)
- Other political affiliations: Ulster Unionist Party (before June 2016)
- Spouse: Olga Walls
- Profession: Quantity Surveyor

Alastair Patterson (born 14 December 1972) is a Northern Irish unionist politician who was an Ulster Unionist Party (UUP) Member of the Legislative Assembly (MLA) for Fermanagh and South Tyrone between January and May 2016.

Patterson defected to the Democratic Unionist Party (DUP) in June 2016, a month after losing his seat in that year's Assembly election.

== Political career ==
As a member of the Ulster Unionist Party, Patterson was co-opted to the Northern Ireland Assembly in January 2016, having replaced Neil Somerville, following the latter's resignation due to ill health.

He served on the Environment Committee, and was Ulster Unionist Party Spokesperson on the Environment.

Patterson contested the 2016 Assembly election, alongside his running mate, Rosemary Barton. In the election, he polled 3,010 (6.4%) of first preference votes, and was eliminated on the fifth count, with his transfers electing Barton.

Following his defeat, he went on to defect to the Democratic Unionist Party, saying he was "let down and disappointed" by UUP decisions both locally and nationally. In an email to Ulster Unionist members, Patterson revealed that the majority of his friends and families were DUP supporters and that he "at a time of weakness on my part give [sic] into the advice they have been giving me since the Election"

== Personal life ==
Outside politics, Patterson spent over twenty years in the Construction Industry, most recently serving as a Senior Quantity Surveyor. Patterson is a keen Pipe Bandsman, a former Drum Major with Field Marshal Montgomery Pipe Band, a four times World Champion Drum Major and current Adjudicator. He is a member of the Orange Order. Patterson is a supporter of Liverpool F.C. and Ulster Rugby.

Northern Ireland Assembly
| Preceded by Neil Somerville | MLA for Fermanagh and South Tyrone; 2016 | Succeeded by Rosemary Barton |
