= John McKay (Northern Ireland politician) =

Northern Irish politician

Member of the Northern Ireland Constitutional Convention for Fermanagh and South Tyrone
- In office 1975–1976

Personal details
- Born: 1945; County Fermanagh, Northern Ireland
- Political party: Ulster Unionist Party

John Alexander McKay (born 1945) was a Northern Irish unionist politician.

== Political career ==
McKay was an Ulster Unionist Party member of the Northern Ireland Constitutional Convention for Fermanagh and South Tyrone. McKay had finished seventh overall in the election but was elected thanks to transfers from fellow United Ulster Unionist Council candidate David Calvert, who was not elected to the body despite finishing above McKay on first preferences. The election was determined through the single transferable vote model.

Northern Ireland Constitutional Convention
New convention	Member for Fermanagh & South Tyrone; 1975–1976	Convention dissolved
