= Colm Gildernew =

Irish politician (born 1969)

Colm Gildernew MLA
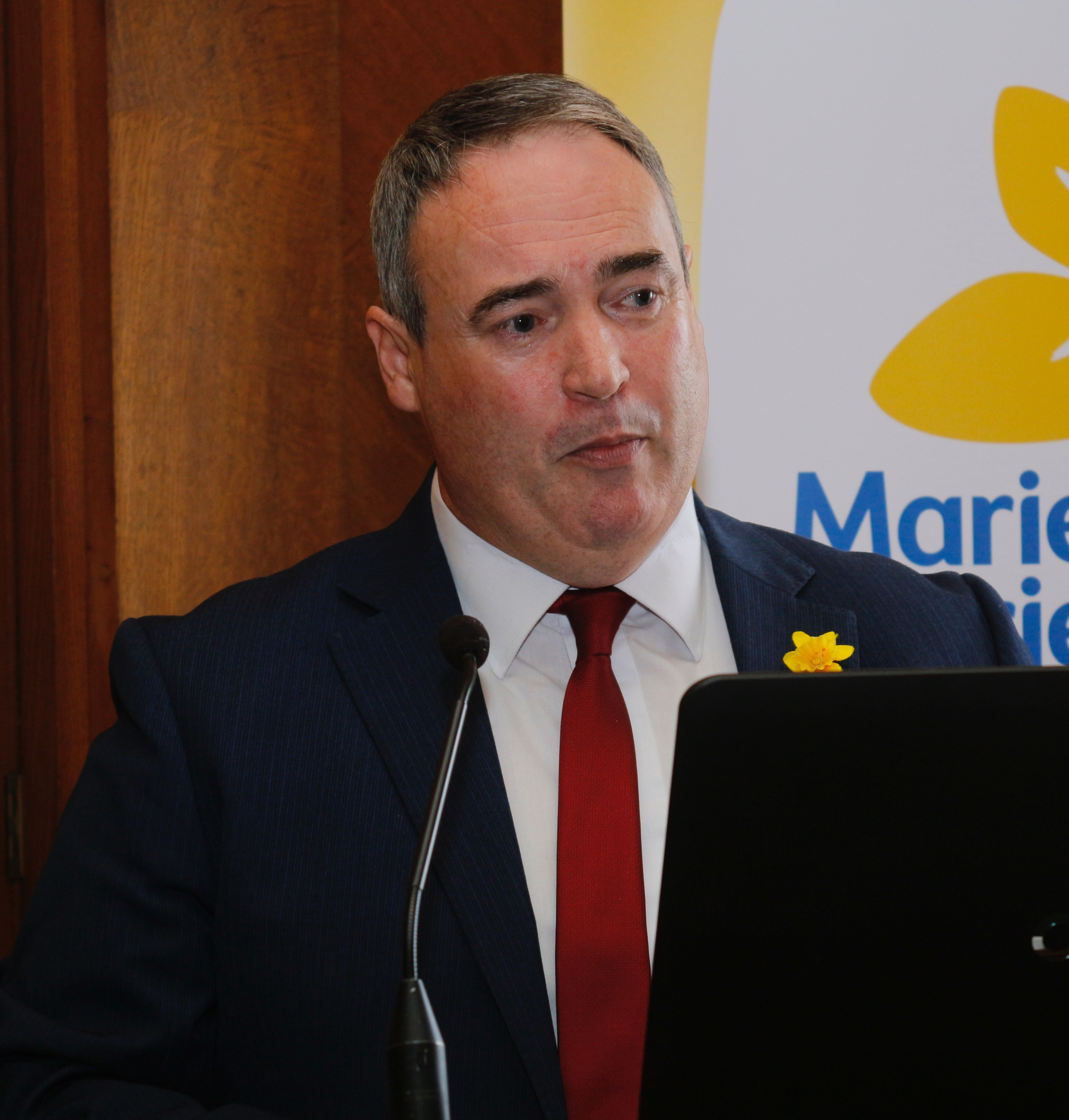

Member of the Legislative Assembly for Fermanagh and South Tyrone
- Incumbent
- Assumed office 20 June 2017
- Preceded by: Michelle Gildernew

Personal details
- Born: 27 June 1969 (age 57) Dungannon, County Tyrone, Northern Ireland
- Party: Sinn Féin
- Children: 3
- Relatives: Michelle Gildernew (sister)

Colm Gildernew MLA (born 27 June 1969) is an Irish Sinn Féin politician, serving as a Member of the Legislative Assembly (MLA) for Fermanagh and South Tyrone since June 2017.

== Career ==
Gildernew was co-opted to the Northern Ireland Assembly in June 2017, following Michelle Gildernew's election to the House of Commons at the 2017 general election.

He retained his seat at the 2022 Assembly election.

== Personal life ==
Gildernew is the older brother of Michelle Gildernew, a former MLA for Fermanagh and South Tyrone, and is a former MP for the Fermanagh and South Tyrone Westminster constituency from 2017 to 2024.

Northern Ireland Assembly
Preceded by Michelle Gildernew	MLA for Fermanagh and South Tyrone; 2017–present	Incumbent
