= Tommy Gallagher (politician) =

Irish politician (1942–2025)

Member of the Northern Ireland Assembly for Fermanagh & South Tyrone
- In office 25 June 1998 – 5 May 2011
- Preceded by: New Creation
- Succeeded by: Phil Flanagan

Member of Fermanagh District Council
- In office 19 May 1989 – 7 June 2001
- Preceded by: Stephen Maguire
- Succeeded by: John O'Kane
- Constituency: Erne North

Northern Ireland Forum Member for Fermanagh and South Tyrone
- In office 30 May 1996 – 25 April 1998
- Preceded by: New forum
- Succeeded by: Forum dissolved

Personal details
- Born: 17 August 1942 Belleek, Ireland
- Died: 17 July 2025 (aged 82) Belfast, Northern Ireland
- Party: Social Democratic and Labour Party
- Education: St. Joseph's Training College, Belfast

Tommy Gallagher (17 August 1942 – 17 July 2025) was an Irish Social Democratic and Labour Party (SDLP) politician who was a Member of the Northern Ireland Assembly (MLA) for Fermanagh and South Tyrone from 1998 to 2011.

== Life and career ==
Born at Bonahill, County Donegal, near Belleek, Co. Fermanagh, Gallagher attended St. Joseph's Training College, Belfast before becoming a teacher in St. Mary's High School, Brollagh, County Fermanagh.

He was a notable Gaelic footballer, having first won a Fermanagh SFC title with Mulleek-Devenish in 1960 followed by a further four SFC and six SFL titles with Devenish. He played midfield for Fermanagh Senior footballers from 1962 until the mid-1970s, whilst his inclusion in the 1974 Fermanagh hurling team also made him Fermanagh's first dual county senior player in both football and hurling for thirty years.

Gallagher joined the Social Democratic and Labour Party when it was formed in 1973, and was elected to represent Fermanagh and South Tyrone on the Northern Ireland Forum in 1996, and held his seat on the Northern Ireland Assembly in 1998 and 2003 and 2007, He was also an SDLP Fermanagh District Councillor from 1989 to 2002.

Gallagher stood for the Westminster seat of Fermanagh and South Tyrone for the SDLP in each general election between 1992 and 2005.He was also a senior negotiator for the SDLP leading up to the signing of the Good Friday Agreement in 1998, as well as being the party’s spokesman on Health and Education.

Gallagher's death at the age of 82 was announced on 17 July 2025.

== Sources ==
- "Mr. Tommy Gallagher". Northern Ireland Assembly. Archived from the original on 24 April 2011.

Northern Ireland Forum
New forum	Member for Fermanagh and South Tyrone; 1996–1998	Forum dissolved
Northern Ireland Assembly
New assembly	MLA for Fermanagh & South Tyrone; 1998–2011	Succeeded by Phil Flanagan
