= Fermanagh and South Tyrone (Assembly constituency) =

Constituency of the Northern Ireland Assembly

Coordinates: 54.542°N 7.309°W

- Northern Ireland Assembly; Parliamentary constituency
- Fermanagh and South Tyrone shown within Northern Ireland

Current constituency
- Created: 1973
- Seats: 5 (2017–); 6 (1996–2016)
- MLAs: Jemma Dolan (SF); Diana Armstrong (UUP); Deborah Erskine (DUP); Colm Gildernew (SF); Áine Murphy (SF)
- Districts: Fermanagh and Omagh District Council; Mid Ulster District Council

Fermanagh and South Tyrone is a constituency in the Northern Ireland Assembly.

It was first used for a Northern Ireland-only election in 1973, which elected the then Northern Ireland Assembly. It usually shares boundaries with the Fermanagh and South Tyrone UK Parliament constituency. However, the boundaries of the two constituencies were slightly different from 1983 to 1986 (because the Assembly boundaries had not caught up with Parliamentary boundary changes) and from 1996 to 1997, when members of the Northern Ireland Forum had been elected from the newly drawn Parliamentary constituencies but the 51st Parliament of the United Kingdom, elected in 1992 under the 1983–95 constituency boundaries, was still in session.

Members were then elected from the constituency to the 1975 Constitutional Convention, the 1982 Assembly, the 1996 Forum and then to the current Assembly from 1998.

For further details of the history and boundaries of the constituency, see Fermanagh and South Tyrone (UK Parliament constituency).

== Members ==
Election	MLA (party)	MLA (party)	MLA (party)	MLA (party)	MLA (party)	MLA (party)
1973	5 seats 1996–1998	Thomas Daly (SDLP)	Austin Currie (SDLP)	John Taylor (UUP)	Harry West (UUP)	Ernest Baird (Vanguard)
1975	5 seats 1996–1998	Thomas Daly (SDLP)	Austin Currie (SDLP)	John McKay (UUP)	Harry West (UUP)	Ernest Baird (Vanguard)
1982	5 seats 1996–1998	Owen Carron (Sinn Féin)	Austin Currie (SDLP)	Raymond Ferguson (UUP)	Ken Maginnis (UUP)	Ivan Foster (DUP)
1996	5 seats 1996–1998	Gerry McHugh (Sinn Féin)	Tommy Gallagher (SDLP)	Sam Foster (UUP)	Ken Maginnis (UUP)	Maurice Morrow (DUP)
1998	Michelle Gildernew (Sinn Féin)	Gerry McHugh (Sinn Féin)	Tommy Gallagher (SDLP)	Sam Foster (UUP)	Joan Carson (UUP)	Maurice Morrow (DUP)
2003	Michelle Gildernew (Sinn Féin)	Tom O'Reilly (Sinn Féin)	Tommy Gallagher (SDLP)	Tom Elliott (UUP)	Arlene Foster (UUP/ DUP)	Maurice Morrow (DUP)
2007	Michelle Gildernew (Sinn Féin)	Gerry McHugh (Sinn Féin)	Tommy Gallagher (SDLP)	Tom Elliott (UUP)	Arlene Foster (UUP/ DUP)	Maurice Morrow (DUP)
2011	Michelle Gildernew (Sinn Féin)	Seán Lynch (Sinn Féin)	Phil Flanagan (Sinn Féin)	Tom Elliott (UUP)	Arlene Foster (UUP/ DUP)	Maurice Morrow (DUP)
July 2012 co-option	Bronwyn McGahan (Sinn Féin)	Seán Lynch (Sinn Féin)	Phil Flanagan (Sinn Féin)	Tom Elliott (UUP)	Arlene Foster (UUP/ DUP)	Maurice Morrow (DUP)
June 2015 co-option	Bronwyn McGahan (Sinn Féin)	Seán Lynch (Sinn Féin)	Phil Flanagan (Sinn Féin)	Neil Somerville (UUP)	Arlene Foster (UUP/ DUP)	Maurice Morrow (DUP)
January 2016 co-option	Bronwyn McGahan (Sinn Féin)	Seán Lynch (Sinn Féin)	Phil Flanagan (Sinn Féin)	Alastair Patterson (UUP)	Arlene Foster (UUP/ DUP)	Maurice Morrow (DUP)
2016	Michelle Gildernew (Sinn Féin)	Seán Lynch (Sinn Féin)	Richie McPhillips (SDLP)	Rosemary Barton (UUP)	Arlene Foster (UUP/ DUP)	Maurice Morrow (DUP)
2017	Michelle Gildernew (Sinn Féin)	Seán Lynch (Sinn Féin)	Jemma Dolan (Sinn Féin)	Rosemary Barton (UUP)	Arlene Foster (UUP/ DUP)	5 seats 2017–present
June 2017 co-option	Colm Gildernew (Sinn Féin)	Seán Lynch (Sinn Féin)	Jemma Dolan (Sinn Féin)	Rosemary Barton (UUP)	Arlene Foster (UUP/ DUP)	5 seats 2017–present
July 2021 co-option	Colm Gildernew (Sinn Féin)	Áine Murphy (Sinn Féin)	Jemma Dolan (Sinn Féin)	Rosemary Barton (UUP)	Arlene Foster (UUP/ DUP)	5 seats 2017–present
October 2021 co-option	Colm Gildernew (Sinn Féin)	Áine Murphy (Sinn Féin)	Jemma Dolan (Sinn Féin)	Rosemary Barton (UUP)	Deborah Erskine (DUP)	5 seats 2017–present
2022	Colm Gildernew (Sinn Féin)	Áine Murphy (Sinn Féin)	Jemma Dolan (Sinn Féin)	Tom Elliott (UUP)	Deborah Erskine (DUP)	5 seats 2017–present
September 2024 co-option	Colm Gildernew (Sinn Féin)	Áine Murphy (Sinn Féin)	Jemma Dolan (Sinn Féin)	Diana Armstrong (UUP)	Deborah Erskine (DUP)	5 seats 2017–present

Note: The columns in this table are used only for presentational purposes, and no significance should be attached to the order of columns. For details of the order in which seats were won at each election, see the detailed results of that election.

== Elections ==
=== Northern Ireland Assembly ===
==== 2027 ====
2027 Assembly election: Fermanagh and South Tyrone – 5 seats
Party	Candidate	FPv%	Count
Party	Candidate	FPv%	1
Sinn Féin	Jemma Dolan		
Sinn Féin	Colm Gildernew		
Sinn Féin	Áine Murphy		

==== 2022 ====
2022 Assembly election: Fermanagh and South Tyrone – 5 seats
Party	Candidate	FPv%	Count							
Party	Candidate	FPv%	1	2	3	4	5	6	7	8
Sinn Féin	**Jemma Dolan**	16.87%	**9,067**							
UUP	**Tom Elliott**	10.12%	5,442	5,497	5,497	7,607	8,112	**9,007**		
Sinn Féin	**Colm Gildernew**	14.07%	7,562	7,865	7,898	7,904	8,124	8,128	8,129	**9,279**
Sinn Féin	**Áine Murphy**	13.73%	7,379	7,644	7,691	7,693	7,815	7,816	7,816	**9,104**
DUP	**Deborah Erskine**	9.80%	5,272	5,333	5,333	5,469	5,532	6,536	6,564	**6,695**
DUP	Paul Bell	7.91%	4,255	4,301	4,301	4,693	4,788	6,033	6,050	6,187
SDLP	Adam Gannon	7.13%	3,836	4,394	4,402	4,439	5,987	6,027	6,029	
TUV	Alex Elliott	5.75%	3,091	3,165	3,165	3,288	3,351			
Alliance	Matthew Beaumont	4.81%	2,583	3,024	3,026	3,151				
UUP	Rosemary Barton	5.41%	2,912	2,959	2,959					
Aontú	Denise Mullen	1.72%	927							
Labour Alternative	Donal O'Cofaigh	1.12%	602							
Green (NI)	Kellie Turtle	0.62%	335							
Independent	Emma DeSouza	0.46%	249							
Independent	Derek Backhouse	0.23%	128							
People Before Profit	Emmett Kilpatrick	0.19%	103							
Electorate: 78,963 Valid: 53,743 (68.06%) Spoilt: 817 Quota: 8,958 Turnout: 54,560 (69.09%)

==== 2017 ====
2017 Assembly election: Fermanagh and South Tyrone – 5 seats
Party	Candidate	FPv%	Count			
Party	Candidate	FPv%	1	2	3	4
DUP	**Arlene Foster**	16.22%	8,479	**8,745**		
Sinn Féin	**Michelle Gildernew**	15.28%	7,987	8,228	**9,385**	
Sinn Féin	**Jemma Dolan**	14.86%	7,767	8,023	**8,928**	
UUP	**Rosemary Barton**	11.60%	6,060	6,863	8,334	**8,442**
Sinn Féin	**Seán Lynch**	11.97%	6,254	6,338	7,174	**7,717**
DUP	Maurice Morrow	13.59%	7,102	7,332	7,405	7,411
SDLP	Richie McPhillips	9.82%	5,134	6,276		
Alliance	Noreen Campbell	2.75%	1,437			
TUV	Alex Elliott	1.49%	780			
Labour Alternative	Donal Ó Cófaigh	1.23%	643			
Green (NI)	Tanya Jones	1.05%	550			
NI Conservatives	Richard Dunn	0.13%	70			
Electorate: 73,100 Valid: 52,263 (71.50%) Spoilt: 812 Quota: 8,711 Turnout: 53,075 (72.61%)

==== 2016 ====
2016 Assembly election: Fermanagh and South Tyrone – 6 seats
Party	Candidate	FPv%	Count						
Party	Candidate	FPv%	1	2	3	4	5	6	7
DUP	**Arlene Foster**	18.66%	**8,801**						
DUP	**Maurice Morrow**	13.99%	6,602	**8,072.85**					
Sinn Féin	**Michelle Gildernew**	14.02%	6,614	6,625.73	6,628.37	**6,838.37**			
UUP	**Rosemary Barton**	6.40%	3,018	3,302.74	3,973.08	4,750.48	4,759.94	**7,659.94**	
Sinn Féin	**Seán Lynch**	10.14%	4,782	4,784.07	4,784.95	4,845.56	6,551.02	6,557.81	**6,565.81**
SDLP	**Richie McPhillips**	8.51%	4,014	4,032.63	4,049.35	4,653.84	4,823.53	5,205.63	**6,107.23**
Sinn Féin	John Feely	8.48%	4,002	4,003.15	4,004.25	4,088.08	5,581.91	5,585.57	5,590.37
UUP	Alastair Patterson	6.38%	3,010	3,140.41	3,563.25	4,205.18	4,207.18		
Sinn Féin	Phil Flanagan	7.31%	3,449	3,452.45	3,452.67	3,510.97			
TUV	Donald Crawford	2.47%	1,164	1,223.11	1,381.95				
Green (NI)	Tanya Jones	1.90%	897	908.73	919.73				
Alliance	Kerri Blyberg	1.14%	539	545.21	552.91				
NI Labour	Damien Harris	0.60%	285	287.07	290.37				
Electorate: 74,257 Valid: 47,177 (63.53%) Spoilt: 757 Quota: 6,740 Turnout: 47,934 (64.55%)

==== 2011 ====
2011 Assembly election: Fermanagh and South Tyrone – 6 seats
Party	Candidate	FPv%	Count					
Party	Candidate	FPv%	1	2	3	4	5	6
Sinn Féin	**Michelle Gildernew**	18.98%	**9,110**					
UUP	**Tom Elliott**	14.37%	**6,896**					
DUP	**Arlene Foster**	14.33%	**6,876**					
DUP	**Maurice Morrow**	10.09%	4,844	4,849.46	4,910.98	5,324.24	**7,229.24**	
Sinn Féin	**Seán Lynch**	10.72%	5,146	6,247.1	6,278.52	6,469	6,475.04	**6,476.04**
Sinn Féin	**Phil Flanagan**	10.59%	5,082	5,781.66	5,799	6,109.2	6,127.72	**6,136.72**
SDLP	Tommy Gallagher	9.60%	4,606	4,947.64	5,304.08	5,639.22	5,940.74	6,074.74
UUP	Kenny Donaldson	4.93%	2,366	2,368.6	2,525.86	3,200.64		
TUV	Alex Elliott	2.56%	1,231	1,231.78	1,249.78			
Independent	Pat Cox	2.08%	997	1,049	1,104.78			
Alliance	Hannah Su	1.76%	845	871.78				
Electorate: 70,985 Valid: 47,999 (67.62%) Spoilt: 942 Quota: 6,858 Turnout: 48,941 (68.95%)

==== 2007 ====
2007 Assembly election: Fermanagh and South Tyrone – 6 seats
Party	Candidate	FPv%	Count							
Party	Candidate	FPv%	1	2	3	4	5	6	7	8
DUP	**Arlene Foster**	15.37%	**7,138**							
Sinn Féin	**Michelle Gildernew**	15.13%	**7,026**							
UUP	**Tom Elliott**	14.22%	6,603	**6,680.42**						
SDLP	**Tommy Gallagher**	9.56%	4,440	4,441.54	4,463.64	4,464.28	4,466.32	4,769.34	**6,640**	
DUP	**Maurice Morrow**	10.12%	4,700	5,098.23	5,098.58	5,120.18	5,304.03	5,333.26	5,345.57	**7,013.57**
Sinn Féin	**Gerry McHugh**	10.99%	5,103	5,103	5,277.1	5,277.1	5,278.25	5,665.8	5,747.25	**5,776.64**
Sinn Féin	Seán Lynch	10.13%	4,704	4,704.42	4,819.92	4,819.96	4,821.96	5,066.91	5,139.16	5,188.38
UUP	Kenny Donaldson	5.45%	2,531	2,544.09	2,544.44	2,563.52	2,676.46	2,823.64	2,887.01	
SDLP	Vincent Currie	4.40%	2,043	2,043.56	2,065.26	2,065.34	2,069.46	2,260.76		
Ind. Republican	Gerry McGeough	1.75%	814	814	824.8	824.8	826.8			
Alliance	Allan Leonard	1.12%	521	521.49	522.79	522.83	535.94			
Republican Sinn Féin	Michael McManus	0.93%	431	431.21	432.36	432.4	432.4			
UK Unionist	Robert McCartney	0.84%	388	393.39	393.64	395				
Electorate: 65,826 Valid: 46,442 (70.55%) Spoilt: 403 Quota: 6,635 Turnout: 46,845 (71.16%)

==== 2003 ====
2003 Assembly election: Fermanagh and South Tyrone – 6 seats
Party	Candidate	FPv%	Count							
Party	Candidate	FPv%	1	2	3	4	5	6	7	8
UUP	**Tom Elliott**	13.39%	6,181	6,284	**7,372**					
SDLP	**Tommy Gallagher**	10.26%	4,735	4,984	5,003	5,034.95	**7,359.95**			
Sinn Féin	**Michelle Gildernew**	14.06%	6,489	6,562	6,565	6,565	**6,719**			
UUP	**Arlene Foster**	10.70%	4,938	5,004	5,868	6,564.51	**6,599.51**			
DUP	**Maurice Morrow**	11.99%	5,536	5,546	5,670	5,684.2	5,689.91	**8,669.91**		
Sinn Féin	**Tom O'Reilly**	10.87%	5,019	5,049	5,051	5,051	5,143	5,152	5,240	**5,473.64**
Sinn Féin	Gerry McHugh	9.52%	4,393	4,432	4,436	4,436	4,594	4,602.71	4,691.71	5,211.5
DUP	Bert Johnston	6.70%	3,094	3,113	3,133	3,139.39	3,162.81			
SDLP	Frank Britton	6.01%	2,772	2,978	2,994	3,011.75				
UUP	Robert Mulligan	4.57%	2,110	2,149						
NI Women's Coalition	Eithne McNulty	1.41%	650							
Alliance	Linda Cleland	0.53%	243							
Electorate: 64,336 Valid: 46,160 (71.75%) Spoilt: 713 Quota: 6,595 Turnout: 46,873 (72.86%)

==== 1998 ====
1998 Assembly election: Fermanagh and South Tyrone – 6 seats
Party	Candidate	FPv%	Count									
Party	Candidate	FPv%	1	2	3	4	5	6	7	8	9	10
SDLP	**Tommy Gallagher**	15.94%	**8,135**									
UUP	**Sam Foster**	10.95%	5,589	5,686	5,690.2	5,859.9	**7,494.9**					
Sinn Féin	**Gerry McHugh**	10.69%	5,459	5,481	5,576	5,886	5,899.3	5,914.5	**9,096.5**			
Sinn Féin	**Michelle Gildernew**	9.21%	4,703	4,712	4,755.3	4,893.6	4,894.6	4,896.6	5,168.8	6,894.55	**8,501.55**	
DUP	**Maurice Morrow**	7.81%	3,987	3,999	4,001.8	4,011.1	4,097.1	6,522.3	6,525.6	6,527.37	6,595.06	**6,627.06**
UUP	**Joan Carson**	8.62%	4,400	4,480	4,482.7	4,619.3	5,253.8	5,495.2	5,497.6	5,498.19	6,141.32	**6,582.32**
UK Unionist	Jim Dixon	8.35%	4,262	4,268	4,268.5	4,299.8	4,365.9	4,879	4,883.1	4,884.28	4,957.84	5,000.84
SDLP	Olive Mullen	5.63%	2,872	2,962	3,485.4	4,302.7	4,338.1	4,352.4	4,482.3	4,548.38		
Sinn Féin	Pat Treanor	6.96%	3,552	3,559	3,585	3,707.7	3,711.3	3,711.3				
DUP	Bert Johnston	6.06%	3,095	3,102	3,103.3	3,119.9	3,309.2					
UUP	Bertie Kerr	5.06%	2,583	2,633	2,636.7	2,720						
NI Women's Coalition	Marie Crawley	3.39%	1,729	1,982	2,071.3							
Alliance	Stephen Farry	1.20%	614									
Natural Law	Simeon Gillan	0.12%	63									
Electorate: 65,383 Valid: 51,043 (78.07%) Spoilt: 880 Quota: 7,292 Turnout: 51,923 (79.41%)

=== 1996 forum ===
Successful candidates are shown in bold.

Party	Candidate(s)	Votes	Percentage
UUP	**Ken Maginnis**; **Sam Foster**; Joan Carson; Bertie Kerr	15,542	32.3
Sinn Féin	**Gerry McHugh**; Michelle Gildernew; Robin Martin; Vincent Kelly; Pat Trainor	11,666	24.2
SDLP	**Tommy Gallagher**; Anthony McGonnell; Anne McQuillan; Vincent Currie; Mary Flanagan	10,399	21.6
DUP	**Maurice Morrow**; Joseph Dodds	6,589	13.7
Alliance	Stephen Farry; Julie Greaves	831	1.7
UK Unionist	Muriel Boston; Robert Peden	468	1.0
Ulster Democratic	Raymond Gilliland; Paul Longman	464	1.0
NI Women's Coalition	Roisin Keenan; Audrey Johnston; Florence Ellis	461	1.0
PUP	Tracy Gould; Paul Ferguson	410	0.9
Labour coalition	Ciaran Molloy; Patrick Mulholland; Nigel Cooke	297	0.6
Green (NI)	Roy Hadden; Roy Johnston; Peg Alexander	208	0.4
Workers' Party	Tommy Owens; Marian Donnelly	199	0.4
Ulster Independence	Simon Dilworth; Stuart Boyd	189	0.4
Democratic Left	Gerry Cullen; Doris Wray	128	0.3
Independent McMullan	Philip McClinchey; Ann McDermott	118	0.2
NI Conservatives	William Quin; Eric Milligan	113	0.2
Independent Chambers	William Chambers; May Blayney	36	0.1
Natural Law	Charles Cunningham; Simeon Gillen; Peter Lavery	23	0.0

=== 1982 ===
1982 Assembly election: Fermanagh and South Tyrone – 5 seats
Party	Candidate	FPv%	Count									
Party	Candidate	FPv%	1	2	3	4	5	6	7	8	9	10
Sinn Féin	**Owen Carron**	23.70%	**14,025**									
UUP	**Ken Maginnis**	17.10%	**10,117**									
UUP	**Raymond Ferguson**	9.93%	5,877	5,884.5	6,215.8	6,268.1	6,966.1	6,976.1	9,403.1	**9,921.1**		
SDLP	**Austin Currie**	11.49%	6,800	7,093.1	7,259.4	7,717.5	7,758.1	8,374.4	8,303.1	8,387.1	**12,401.7**	
DUP	**Ivan Foster**	7.31%	4,324	4,327.6	4,341.6	4,349.6	4,955.6	4,956.6	5,141.6	8,069.9	8,113.7	**8,145.7**
Sinn Féin	Francie Molloy	4.56%	2,700	6,096.3	6,108.5	6,414.4	6,426.7	6,527.8	6,536.4	6,539.7	6,847.8	7,602.8
SDLP	Joseph Maguire	4.92%	2,912	3,059.9	3,167.7	3,460.5	3,467.5	5,179.3	5,196.3	5,201.6		
DUP	Bert Johnston	5.01%	2,965	2,965.9	2,985.9	2,990.2	3,336.2	3,337.2	3,559.2			
UUP	Cecil Noble	4.39%	2,597	2,601.8	2,683.8	2,706.1	2,964.4	2,970.4				
SDLP	Fergus McQuillan	3.87%	2,288	2,399.6	2,447.9	2,633.9	2,633.9					
UUUP	Ernest Baird	3.40%	2,010	2,011.5	2,040.5	2,049.8						
Workers' Party	Tommy Owens	2.36%	1,394	1,480.7	1,724.3							
Alliance	John Haslett	1.98%	1,171	1,177.3								
Electorate: 73,930 Valid: 59,180 (80.05%) Spoilt: 2,171 Quota: 9,864 Turnout: 61,351 (82.99%)

=== 1975 ===
1975 Constitutional Convention: Fermanagh and South Tyrone – 5 seats
Party	Candidate	FPv%	Count								
Party	Candidate	FPv%	1	2	3	4	5	6	7	8	9
UUP	**Harry West**	24.36%	**12,922**								
SDLP	**Austin Currie**	18.82%	**9,984**								
Vanguard	**Ernie Baird**	15.21%	8,067	**9,706.28**							
SDLP	**Thomas Daly**	13.47%	7,145	7,147.79	8,063.98	8,063.98	8,103.66	8,708.95	**9,322.95**		
UUP	**John McKay**	6.02%	3,194	5,111.66	5,113.2	5,487.12	5,817.15	5,825.75	6,365.48	6,376.26	**9,836.48**
SDLP	Thomas Murray	7.81%	4,143	4,153.85	4,239.54	4,239.86	4,254.62	4,559.72	4,741.67	5,108.19	5,123.19
DUP	David Calvert	6.39%	3,389	3,636.07	3.636.51	4,052.99	4,212.2	4,213.45	4,485.99	4,496.77	
Alliance	Bill Barbour	2.76%	1,464	1,492.21	1,506.07	1,514.71	2,179.7	2,261.51			
Republican Clubs	Eugene Lyttle	2.83%	1,501	1,503.48	1,547.15	1,548.11	1,594.83				
Unionist Party NI	George Cathcart	2.35%	1,245	1,358.15	1,359.8	1,392.6					
Electorate: 70,344 Valid: 53,054 (75.42%) Spoilt: 2,122 Quota: 8,843 Turnout: 55,176 (78.44%)

Note: Ernie Baird, David Calvert, John McKay and Harry West were all UUUC-endorsed candidates.

=== 1973 ===
1973 Assembly election: Fermanagh and South Tyrone – 5 seats
Party	Candidate	FPv%	Count						
Party	Candidate	FPv%	1	2	3	4	5	6	7
SDLP	**Austin Currie**	19.35%	**11,016**						
Vanguard	**Ernest Baird**	14.85%	8,456	8,517	8,517.56	**10,081.56**			
UUP	**John Taylor**	14.77%	8,410	8,469	8,469.7	8,712.84	9,131.88	9,338.8	**9,779.8**
SDLP	**Thomas Daly**	13.19%	7,511	7,552	8,324.8	8,329.08	8,329.08	8,694.22	**9,360.5**
UUP	**Harry West**	14.40%	8,198	8,252	8,252.84	8,336.84	8,491.4	8,674.02	**9,084.44**
SDLP	David McQuillan	7.16%	4,074	4,080	4,558.8	4,558.8	4,559.28	4,792.98	5,175.92
Republican Clubs	James McQuaid	5.13%	2,923	2,930	3,046.62	3,049.76	3,050.24	3,109.64	3,561.4
Independent	Jack Hassard	3.53%	2,008	2,068	2,190.36	2,209.36	2,219.92	3,076.86	
Alliance	Patrick Reimill	3.44%	1,960	2,028	2,050.4	2,067.54	2,070.9		
DUP	William Mitchell	3.47%	1,974	1,992	1,992.98				
Independent	David Brien	0.70%	396						
Electorate: 68,733 Valid: 56,926 (82.82%) Spoilt: 1,222 Quota: 9,488 Turnout: 58,148 (84.60%)

Note: Austin Currie, John Taylor and Harry West were all members of the House of Commons of Northern Ireland when it was prorogued in 1972.
